= 2023–24 Portland Pilots women's basketball team =

American college basketball season

2023–24 Portland Pilots women's basketball
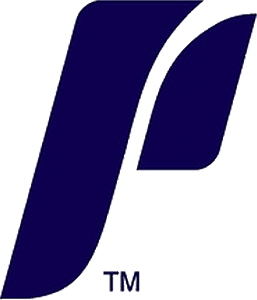

WCC tournament champions

NCAA tournament, first round
- Conference: West Coast Conference
- Record: 21–13 (10–6 WCC)
- Head coach: Michael Meek (5th season)
- Assistant coaches: Tom Batsell; Sharon Rissmiller; Jerod Gibson
- Home arena: Chiles Center

2023–24 West Coast Conference women's basketball standings
	Conf.				Overall
Team	W		L	PCT	W		L	PCT
No. 14 Gonzaga	16	–	0	1.000	32	–	4	.889
Santa Clara	12	–	4	.750	25	–	9	.735
Portland †	10	–	6	.625	21	–	13	.618
San Francisco	10	–	6	.625	14	–	16	.467
Pacific	8	–	8	.500	18	–	15	.545
Saint Mary's	6	–	10	.375	13	–	18	.419
Loyola Marymount	5	–	11	.313	11	–	19	.367
San Diego	4	–	12	.250	9	–	22	.290
Pepperdine	1	–	15	.063	5	–	25	.167
† 2024 WCC tournament winner Rankings from AP poll

The 2023–24 Portland Pilots women's basketball team represented the University of Portland in the 2023–24 NCAA Division I women's basketball season. The Pilots were led by fifth-year coach Michael Meek and played their home games at Chiles Center in Portland, Oregon as members of the West Coast Conference (WCC). They finished the season 21–13, 10–6 in WCC play, to finish in third place. As the No. 3 seed in the WCC tournament, they defeated Loyola Marymount in the quarterfinals, Santa Clara in the semifinals and Gonzaga in the championship to win championship. They received an automatic bid to the NCAA tournament where as the No. 13 seed in the Albany 2 region, they lost in the first round by Kansas State.

== Previous season ==
The Pilots finished the season at 23–9 overall, 15–3 in WCC play, to finish in second place. They defeated Pacific and Gonzaga to win WCC women's tournament. As a result, they received an automatic bid to the NCAA tournament as a No. 12 seed in the Greenville region 1 where they lost in the first round to Oklahoma.

== Offseason ==
=== Departures ===
Portland departures
Name	Num	Pos.	Height	Year	Hometown	Reason for departure
Keeley Frawley	2	F	6' 0"	Junior	Melbourne, Australia	Transferred to Santa Clara
Haylee Andrews	10	G	5' 9"	Senior	Townsville, Australia	Graduated
Alex Fowler	12	F	6' 2"	Junior	Townsville, Australia	Signed to play professionally in Australia with UC Capitals
Chance Bucher	14	G	5' 8"	Sophomore	Half Moon Bay, CA	Transferred to Eckerd College
Emily Sewell	21	F	6' 3"	Sophomore	Melbourne, Australia	Transferred to California Baptist
MJ Bruno	22	G	6' 0"	Sophomore	Spokane, WA	Transferred to Montana
Liana Kaitu'u	23	F	6' 0"	(redshirt) Junior	Salt Lake City, UT	Transferred to Utah Valley
Kelsey Lenzie	32	G	5' 7"	Junior	Seattle, WA	Graduated
Maddi Condron	34	C	6' 7"	Junior	Woodend, Australia	Graduated

=== Incoming ===
Portland incoming transfers
Name	Num	Pos.	Height	Year	Hometown	Previous school
Natalie Fraley	10	G	6' 0"	Sophomore	Kelso, WA	Utah State
Kennedy Dickie	12	F	6' 0"	GS Senior	Kelowna, BC	San Francisco
Anna Eddy	21	G	5' 9"	(redshirt) Junior	Portland, OR	Seattle Pacific
Kianna Hamilton-Fisher	25	G	6' 0"	(redshirt) Senior	Woodland Hills, CA	Long Beach State
Piath Gabriel	36	C	6' 5"	Senior	Manchester, NH	UMass

==== Recruiting ====
There was no recruiting class of 2023.

== Roster ==
2023–24 Portland Pilots women's basketball team
Players
Coaches

Pos.	#	Name	Height	Year	Previous school	Hometown
G	1	McKelle Meek	5 ft 7 in (1.7 m)	Jr	Southridge	Beaverton, OR
F	2	Dyani Ananiev	6 ft 1 in (1.85 m)	Fr	Wyndham	St. Andrews, Australia
G	3	Florence Dallow	6 ft 0 in (1.83 m)	RS Fr	Epsom Girls'	Beaverton, OR
G	4	Melika Samia	5 ft 9 in (1.75 m)	So	Mount Maunganui College	Napier, New Zealand
G	5	Emme Shearer	6 ft 0 in (1.83 m)	Jr	Westlake Girls	Auckland, New Zealand
G	10	Natalie Fraley	6 ft 0 in (1.83 m)	So	Kelso; Utah State	Kelso, WA
G	11	Emma Strelein	5 ft 11 in (1.8 m)	RS So	Kennedy Baptist	Perth, Australia
F	12	Kennedy Dickie	6 ft 0 in (1.83 m)	GS	Kelowna Secondary; San Francisco	Kelowna, BC
F	20	Lainey Spear	6 ft 2 in (1.88 m)	Fr	Beaverton	Beaverton, OR
G	21	Anna Eddy	5 ft 9 in (1.75 m)	RS Jr	St. Mary's Academy; Seattle Pacific	Portland, OR
G	22	Rhyan Mogel	5 ft 10 in (1.78 m)	Fr	Clackamas	Happy Valley, OR
G	24	Maisie Burnham	6 ft 0 in (1.83 m)	Jr	Liberty HS; Eastern Washington	Spangle, WA
G	25	Kianna Hamilton	6 ft 0 in (1.83 m)	RS Sr	El Camino Real Charter; Long Beach State	Woodland Hills, CA
F	30	Lucy Cochrane	6 ft 6 in (1.98 m)	Sr	Catholic Ladies College; Oregon	Melbourne, Australia
C	36	Piath Gabriel	6 ft 5 in (1.96 m)	Sr	Bradford Christian Academy; UMass	Manchester, NH

Head coach

- Michael Meek (Eastern Oregon)

Assistant coach(es)

- Tom Batsell (Pacific)
- Sharon Rissmiller (Portland)
- Jerod Gibson (Portland State)

Legend

- (C) Team captain
- (S) Suspended
- (I) Ineligible
- (W) Walk-on
- Injured
- Current redshirt

Roster

== Schedule and results ==
Date time, TV	Rank^{#}	Opponent^{#}	Result	Record	High points	High rebounds	High assists	Site (attendance) city, state
Non-conference regular season
November 6, 2023*; 5:00 p.m., ESPN+		San Diego State	W 83–70	1–0	17 – Shearer	9 – Cochrane	5 – Meek	Chiles Center (409); Portland, OR
November 10, 2023*; 6:00 p.m., KRCW/ESPN+		Villanova	L 42–64	1–1	11 – Cochrane	8 – Cochrane	3 – Hamilton	Chiles Center (733); Portland, OR
November 14, 2023*; 6:00 p.m., ESPN+		at Seattle	W 89–61	2–1	20 – Ananiev	6 – Dickie	6 – Meek	Redhawk Center (342); Seattle, WA
November 16, 2023*; 11:00 a.m., ESPN+		Warner Pacific	W 86–49	3–1	20 – Ananiev	10 – Fraley	4 – Burnham	Chiles Center (877); Portland, OR
November 22, 2023*; 2:00 p.m., ESPN+		at California Baptist	L 66–71	3–2	20 – Ananiev	10 – Fraley	4 – Burnham	CBU Events Center (231); Riverside, CA
November 24, 2023*; 12:00 p.m.		vs. Northern Arizona; Las Vegas Holiday Classic	L 65–66	3–3	21 – Shearer	6 – Cochrane	5 – Meek	Orleans Arena; Paradise, NV
November 25, 2023*; 12:00 p.m.		vs. Rhode Island; Las Vegas Holiday Classic	L 58–64	3–4	13 – Burnham	10 – Cochrane	4 – Dickie	Orleans Arena; Paradise, NV
November 30, 2023*; 6:00 p.m., KRCW/ESPN+		Oregon	W 91–60	4–4	15 – 2 tied	9 – 2 tied	7 – 2 tied	Chiles Center (1,325); Portland, OR
December 2, 2023*; 5:00 p.m., ESPN+		Montana State	W 73–64	5–4	18 – Ananiev	9 – Cochrane	4 – Meek	Chiles Center (525); Portland, OR
December 7, 2023*; 4:30 p.m., ESPN+		at Stephen F. Austin	L 71–76	5–5	14 – 2 tied	11 – Cochrane	3 – 3 tied	William R. Johnson Coliseum (1,182); Nacogdoches, TX
December 9, 2023*; 1:00 p.m., ESPN+		at UTEP	W 68–63 ^{OT}	6–5	16 – Dickie	9 – Cochrane	5 – Meek	Don Haskins Center (1,221); El Paso, TX
December 15, 2023*; 7:00 p.m., P12N		at No. 9 Stanford	L 51–81	6–6	12 – Shearer	4 – 2 tied	4 – Hamilton	Maples Pavilion (2,875); Stanford, CA
December 17, 2023*; 2:00 p.m., ESPN+		Willamette	W 83–40	7–6	16 – Spear	8 – Dallow	5 – Mogel	Chiles Center (425); Portland, OR
December 20, 2023*; 2:00 p.m., ESPN+		at Portland State	W 67–54	8–6	29 – Dickie	7 – Cochrane	5 – Cochrane	Viking Pavilion (449); Portland, OR
WCC regular season
January 4, 2024; 6:00 p.m., KRCW/ESPN+		No. 18 Gonzaga	L 53–74	8–7 (0–1)	13 – Burnham	8 – Shearer	2 – 2 tied	Chiles Center (1,503); Portland, OR
January 6, 2024; 2:00 p.m., ESPN+		at San Francisco	W 67–60	9–7 (1–1)	17 – Dickie	13 – Dickie	7 – Meek	War Memorial Gymnasium (232); San Francisco, CA
January 11, 2024; 6:00 p.m., ESPN+		San Diego	W 65–54	10–7 (2–1)	17 – Burnham	8 – Cochrane	6 – Meek	Chiles Center (436); Portland, OR
January 13, 2024; 5:00 p.m., ESPN+		Santa Clara	W 73–63	11–7 (3–1)	15 – Shearer	6 – Dickie	4 – 2 tied	Chiles Center (196); Portland, OR
January 22, 2024; 12:00 p.m., ESPN+		Saint Mary's; Rescheduled from January 18	L 67–73 ^{OT}	11–8 (3–2)	17 – Burnham	14 – Burnham	3 – 3 tied	Chiles Center (244); Portland, OR
January 25, 2024; 6:00 p.m., ESPN+		at Pepperdine	W 82–49	12–8 (4–2)	18 – Shearer	7 – Cochrane	6 – Dickie	Firestone Fieldhouse (158); Malibu, CA
January 27, 2024; 2:00 p.m., ESPN+		at San Diego	W 64–59	13–8 (5–2)	21 – Shearer	7 – Burnham	3 – Hamilton	Jenny Craig Pavilion (388); San Diego, CA
February 1, 2024; 6:00 p.m., ESPN+		Pacific	W 85–72	14–8 (6–2)	23 – Shearer	6 – Shearer	6 – Mogel	Chiles Center (372); Portland, OR
February 3, 2024; 5:00 p.m., ESPN+		at Saint Mary's	W 68–35	15–8 (7–2)	15 – Shearer	7 – 2 tied	4 – Cochrane	University Credit Union Pavilion (361); Moraga, CA
February 8, 2024; 6:00 p.m., KRCW/ESPN+		Loyola Marymount	W 58–52	16–8 (8–2)	16 – Ananiev	5 – Cochrane	3 – 2 tied	Chiles Center (477); Portland, OR
February 10, 2024; 3:00 p.m., ESPN+		Pepperdine	W 78–46	17–8 (9–2)	19 – Ananiev	6 – Fraley	4 – 2 tied	Chiles Center (816); Portland, OR
February 15, 2024; 6:00 p.m., ESPN+		at Pacific	L 74–80	17–9 (9–3)	14 – Meek	7 – 2 tied	8 – Cochrane	Alex G. Spanos Center; Stockton, CA
February 17, 2024; 2:00 p.m., ESPN+		at Santa Clara	L 58–66	17–10 (9–4)	13 – Meek	9 – Burnham	4 – Meek	Leavey Center (594); Santa Clara, CA
February 24, 2024; 5:00 p.m., ESPN+		San Francisco	L 47–59	17–11 (9–5)	11 – Dickie	7 – Cochrane	4 – Shearer	Chiles Center (833); Portland, OR
February 28, 2024; 8:00 p.m., ESPNU		at No. 16 Gonzaga	L 40–90	17–12 (9–6)	13 – Shearer	8 – Dickie	2 – 3 tied	McCarthey Athletic Center (6,000); Spokane, WA
March 2, 2024; 4:00 p.m., ESPN+		at Loyola Marymount	W 75–63	18–12 (10–6)	18 – Shearer	7 – 2 tied	5 – Hamilton	Gersten Pavilion (603); Los Angeles, CA
WCC tournament
March 9, 2024; 3:30 p.m., ESPN+	(3)	vs. (7) Loyola Marymount; Quarterfinals	W 78–51	19–12	25 – Dickie	7 – Dickie	8 – Cochrane	Orleans Arena (1,387); Paradise, NV
March 11, 2024; 2:30 p.m., ESPN+	(3)	vs. (2) Santa Clara; Semifinals	W 63–61	20–12	12 – Burnham	11 – Dickie	5 – Shearer	Orleans Arena; Paradise, NV
March 12, 2024; 1:00 p.m., ESPNU	(3)	vs. (1) No. 14 Gonzaga; Championship	W 67–66	21–12	16 – Dickie	7 – Cochrane	6 – Meek	Orleans Arena (2,594); Paradise, NV
NCAA tournament
March 22, 2024*; 1:30 p.m., ESPNews	(13 A2)	at (4 A2) No. 15 Kansas State; First round	L 65–78	21–13	21 – Burnham	8 – Burnham	5 – 2 tied	Bramlage Coliseum; Manhattan, KS
*Non-conference game. ^{#}Rankings from AP poll. (#) Tournament seedings in parentheses. A2=Albany 2. All times are in Pacific.

== See also ==
- 2023–24 Portland Pilots men's basketball team
