= 2023–24 Santa Clara Broncos women's basketball team =

American college basketball season

2023–24 Santa Clara Broncos women's basketball

WBIT, second round
- Conference: West Coast Conference
- Record: 25–9 (12–4 WCC)
- Head coach: Bill Carr (8th season)
- Associate head coach: Michael Floyd
- Assistant coaches: Kristin Iwanaga; Kerri Nakamoto
- Home arena: Leavey Center

2023–24 West Coast Conference women's basketball standings
	Conf.				Overall
Team	W		L	PCT	W		L	PCT
No. 14 Gonzaga	16	–	0	1.000	32	–	4	.889
Santa Clara	12	–	4	.750	25	–	9	.735
Portland †	10	–	6	.625	21	–	13	.618
San Francisco	10	–	6	.625	14	–	16	.467
Pacific	8	–	8	.500	18	–	15	.545
Saint Mary's	6	–	10	.375	13	–	18	.419
Loyola Marymount	5	–	11	.313	11	–	19	.367
San Diego	4	–	12	.250	9	–	22	.290
Pepperdine	1	–	15	.063	5	–	25	.167
† 2024 WCC tournament winner Rankings from AP poll

The 2023–24 Santa Clara Broncos women's basketball team represented Santa Clara University in the 2023–24 NCAA Division I women's basketball season. The Broncos were led by eighth-year head coach Bill Carr. The Broncos played their home games at the Leavey Center in Santa Clara, California and were members of the West Coast Conference (WCC).

The Broncos finished the season 25–9, 12–4 in WCC play, to finish in second place. As the No. 2 seed in the WCC tournament, they lost in the semifinals to Portland. They received an at-large bid to the WBIT where they defeated BYU in the first round before losing to Washington State in the second round.

== Previous season ==
The Broncos finished the 2022–23 season 15–17, 6–12 in WCC play, to finish in a tie for seventh place. As the No. 8 seed in the WCC tournament, they lost in the first round to Pepperdine.

== Offseason ==
=== Departures ===
Santa Clara departures
Name	Num	Pos.	Height	Year	Hometown	Reason for departure
Ayzhiana Basallo	3	G	5' 5"	Senior	San Francisco, CA	Graduated
Anna Johnson	4	G	5' 10"	Junior	Manhattan Beach, CA	
Lexie Pritchard	11	G	5' 10"	Senior	West Linn, OR	Graduate transferred to Samford
Ashlee Maldonado	12	G	5' 7"	Junior	Sunnyside, WA	Transferred to Providence
Emma Ellinghouse	15	C	6' 3"	Junior	Boise, ID	

=== Incoming ===
Santa Clara incoming transfers
Name	Num	Pos.	Height	Year	Hometown	Previous school
Malia Latu	0	G	5' 8"	Junior	East Palo Alto, CA	San Francisco
Keeley Frawley	2	F	6' 0"	Senior	Melbourne, Australia	Portland
Emma Shaffer	52	F	6' 2"	GS Senior	Cincinnati, OH	Bucknell

==== Recruiting ====
There was no recruiting class of 2023.

== Roster ==
2023–24 Santa Clara Broncos women's basketball team
Players
Coaches

Pos.	#	Name	Height	Year	Previous school	Hometown
G	0	Malia Latu	5 ft 8 in (1.73 m)	Jr	Menlo-Atherton HS; San Francisco	East Palo Alto, CA
F	2	Keeley Frawley	6 ft 0 in (1.83 m)	Sr	Haileybury College; Portland	Melbourne, Australia
F	5	Olivia Pollerd	6 ft 3 in (1.91 m)	Jr	Lake Ginninderra College; Washington	Melbourne, Australia
F	10	Georgia Grigoropoulou	6 ft 3 in (1.91 m)	So	ACS Athens	Athens, Greece
G	12	Maddie Naro	5 ft 7 in (1.7 m)	Fr	Beaverton HS	Beaverton, OR
G/F	13	Lara Edmanson	6 ft 0 in (1.83 m)	Sr	MLC	Melbourne, Australia
G	22	Jayde Cadee	5 ft 11 in (1.8 m)	Sr	Ivanhoe Girls Grammar School; UC Irvine	Melbourne, Australia
G	23	Marya Hudgins	6 ft 0 in (1.83 m)	So	Grandview HS	Aurora, CO
G	24	Rafailia Stergaki	5 ft 10 in (1.78 m)	Jr	Aristotelio College	Thessaloniki, Greece
G	31	Ashley Hiraki	5 ft 7 in (1.7 m)	Sr	Archbishop HS	San Jose, CA
F	33	Danja Stafford Collins	6 ft 1 in (1.85 m)	GS	Mountain View HS; Eastern Arizona College	Orem, UT
G	34	Tess Heal	5 ft 10 in (1.78 m)	So	Lowther Hall	Melbourne, Australia
F	52	Emma Shaffer	6 ft 2 in (1.88 m)	GS	Ursuline Academy; Bucknell	Cincinnati, OH

Head coach

- Bill Carr (San Francisco)

Assistant coach(es)

- Michael Floyd (Murray State)
- Kristin Iwanaga (California)
- Kerri Nakamoto (Cal Poly)

Legend

- (C) Team captain
- (S) Suspended
- (I) Ineligible
- (W) Walk-on
- Injured
- Current redshirt

Roster
Last update: May 13, 2025

== Schedule and results ==
Date time, TV	Rank^{#}	Opponent^{#}	Result	Record	High points	High rebounds	High assists	Site (attendance) city, state
Exhibition
October 27, 2023*; 6:00 p.m.		Cal State Monterey Bay	W 82–38		–	–	–	Leavey Center; Santa Clara, CA
Non-conference regular season
November 6, 2023*; 7:00 p.m., MW Network		at San Jose State	W 55–47	1–0	20 – Heal	7 – Pollerd	2 – 2 tied	Provident Credit Union Event Center (733); San Jose, CA
November 8, 2023*; 7:00 p.m.		at California	L 56–71	1–1	15 – Heal	13 – Hudgins	3 – Heal	Haas Pavilion (819); Berkeley, CA
November 11, 2023*; 1:00 p.m., ESPN+		Hawaii	W 62–51	2–1	16 – Heal	9 – Hudgins	3 – 2 tied	Leavey Center (263); Santa Clara, CA
November 14, 2023*; 6:00 p.m., ESPN+		Cal State Northridge	W 71–39	3–1	19 – Heal	11 – Hudgins	5 – Heal	Leavey Center (198); Santa Clara, CA
November 18, 2023*; 12:00 p.m.		at Oregon	W 89–50	4–1	21 – Heal	7 – 3 tied	8 – Heal	Matthew Knight Arena (5,207); Eugene, OR
November 21, 2023*; 6:00 p.m., ESPN+		Texas A&M–Corpus Christi	W 75–54	5–1	17 – Heal	10 – Hudgins	5 – Pollerd	Leavey Center (206); Santa Clara, CA
November 24, 2023*; 4:00 p.m., FloSports		vs. Boise State; Las Vegas Thanksgiving Classic	W 62–52	6–1	18 – Pollerd	8 – Hudgins	9 – Heal	South Point Arena; Paradise, NV
November 25, 2023*; 4:00 p.m., FloSports		vs. Texas Tech; Las Vegas Thanksgiving Classic	L 56–61	6–2	18 – Heal	5 – 3 tied	6 – Heal	South Point Arena; Paradise, NV
November 29, 2023*; 6:30 p.m., ESPN+		at Sacramento State	W 70–65	7–2	22 – Pollerd	4 – 2 tied	7 – 2 tied	Hornets Nest (309); Sacramento, CA
December 1, 2023*; 6:00 p.m., ESPN+		Lincoln (CA)	W 113–37	8–2	19 – Shaffer	12 – Hudgins	5 – Edmanson	Leavey Center (237); Santa Clara, CA
December 10, 2023*; 2:00 p.m., ESPN+		Menlo College	W 80–39	9–2	18 – Pollerd	13 – Hudgins	8 – Heal	Leavey Center (198); Santa Clara, CA
December 15, 2023*; 6:00 p.m.		at Oregon State	L 52–80	9–3	17 – 2 tied	7 – Hudgins	3 – 2 tied	Gill Coliseum (3,522); Corvallis, OR
December 19, 2023*; 6:00 p.m., ESPN+		at UC Riverside	W 76–46	10–3	22 – Pollerd	10 – Frawley	3 – 3 tied	SRC Arena (113); Riverside, CA
December 21, 2023*; 4:00 p.m., ESPN+		at Cal State Fullerton	W 76–57	11–3	22 – Heal	8 – Hudgins	3 – 2 tied	Titan Gym (176); Fullerton, CA
December 30, 2023*; 12:00 p.m.		at Arizona State	W 65–55	12–3	23 – Heal	8 – Pollerd	3 – 3 tied	Desert Financial Arena (1,586); Tempe, AZ
WCC regular season
January 6, 2024; 2:00 p.m., ESPN+		Pacific	W 80–77	13–3 (1–0)	30 – Heal	6 – Hiraki	6 – Heal	Leavey Center (388); Santa Clara, CA
January 11, 2024; 6:00 p.m., ESPN+		at No. 16 Gonzaga	L 49–87	13–4 (1–1)	10 – Heal	7 – Stafford Collins	4 – Pollerd	McCarthey Athletic Center (5,155); Spokane, WA
January 13, 2024; 5:00 p.m., ESPN+		at Portland	L 63–73	13–5 (1–2)	19 – Heal	9 – Frawley	3 – Heal	Chiles Center (196); Portland, OR
January 18, 2024; 6:00 p.m., ESPN+		Pepperdine	W 92–36	14–5 (2–2)	23 – Pollerd	11 – Shaffer	4 – 2 tied	Leavey Center (342); Santa Clara, CA
January 20, 2024; 1:00 p.m., ESPN+		San Francisco	W 72–59	15–5 (3–2)	21 – Heal	7 – Pollerd	3 – Heal	Leavey Center (352); Santa Clara, CA
January 25, 2024; 4:00 p.m., ESPN+		No. 17 Gonzaga	L 45–82	15–6 (3–3)	22 – Heal	7 – Frawley	3 – Heal	Leavey Center (337); Santa Clara, CA
January 27, 2024; 2:00 p.m., ESPN+		at Saint Mary's	L 67–74	15–7 (3–4)	20 – Pollerd	7 – Frawley	4 – Heal	University Credit Union Pavilion (766); Moraga, CA
February 1, 2024; 7:00 p.m., ESPN+		at Loyola Marymount	W 63–49	16–7 (4–4)	24 – Pollerd	6 – 3 tied	4 – Heal	Gersten Pavilion (235); Los Angeles, CA
February 3, 2024; 2:00 p.m., ESPN+		at Pepperdine	W 79–58	17–7 (5–4)	25 – Pollerd	10 – Heal	10 – Heal	Firestone Fieldhouse (202); Moraga, CA
February 8, 2024; 6:00 p.m., ESPN+		San Diego	W 83–57	18–7 (6–4)	29 – Heal	8 – Shaffer	7 – Heal	Leavey Center (418); Santa Clara, CA
February 10, 2024; 2:00 p.m., ESPN+		Saint Mary's	W 70–58	19–7 (7–4)	18 – Hudgins	8 – Shaffer	6 – Heal	Leavey Center (319); Santa Clara, CA
February 15, 2024; 6:00 p.m., ESPN+		at San Francisco	W 73–65	20–7 (8–4)	27 – Heal	7 – Hudgins	7 – Heal	War Memorial Gymnasium (315); San Francisco, CA
February 17, 2024; 2:00 p.m., ESPN+		Portland	W 66–58	21–7 (9–4)	24 – Heal	6 – Pollerd	4 – Pollerd	Leavey Center (594); Santa Clara, CA
February 22, 2024; 6:00 p.m., ESPN+		at San Diego	W 66–57	22–7 (10–4)	30 – Heal	8 – Heal	4 – Heal	Jenny Craig Pavilion (384); San Diego, CA
February 29, 2024; 6:00 p.m., ESPN+		Loyola Marymount	W 86–45	23–7 (11–4)	21 – Pollerd	9 – Shaffer	10 – Heal	Leavey Center (551); Santa Clara, CA
March 2, 2024; 2:00 p.m., ESPN+		at Pacific	W 85–77	24–7 (12–4)	40 – Heal	6 – Edmanson	7 – Heal	Alex G. Spanos Center (917); Stockton, CA
WCC women's tournament
March 11, 2024; 2:30 p.m., ESPN+	(2)	vs. (3) Portland; Semifinals	L 61–63	24–8	20 – Heal	7 – Heal	8 – Heal	Orleans Arena; Paradise, NV
WBIT
March 21, 2024*; 6:00 p.m., ESPN+	(4)	BYU; First round	W 60–59	25–8	17 – Heal	7 – Shaffer	6 – Heal	Leavey Center (357); Santa Clara, CA
March 24, 2024*; 1:00 p.m., ESPN+	(4)	at (1) Washington State; Second round	L 47–73	25–9	18 – Heal	5 – Pollerd	4 – Heal	Beasley Coliseum (674); Pullman, WA
*Non-conference game. ^{#}Rankings from AP poll. (#) Tournament seedings in parentheses. All times are in Pacific.

== See also ==
- 2023–24 Santa Clara Broncos men's basketball team
