= 2023–24 San Francisco Dons women's basketball team =

American college basketball season

2023–24 San Francisco Dons women's basketball
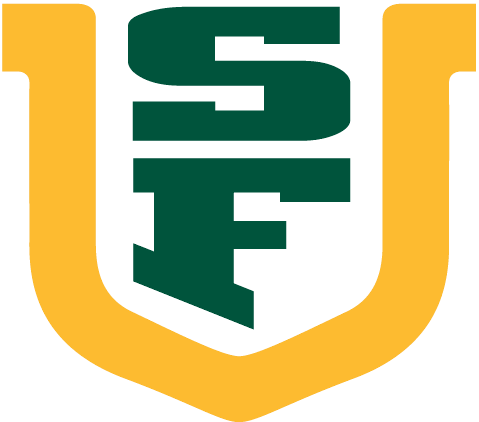
- Conference: West Coast Conference
- Record: 14–16 (10–6 WCC)
- Head coach: Molly Goodenbour (8th season)
- Associate head coach: Janell Jones
- Assistant coaches: Chris Straker; Amaka Uzomah
- Home arena: War Memorial Gymnasium

2023–24 West Coast Conference women's basketball standings
	Conf.				Overall
Team	W		L	PCT	W		L	PCT
No. 14 Gonzaga	16	–	0	1.000	32	–	4	.889
Santa Clara	12	–	4	.750	25	–	9	.735
Portland †	10	–	6	.625	21	–	13	.618
San Francisco	10	–	6	.625	14	–	16	.467
Pacific	8	–	8	.500	18	–	15	.545
Saint Mary's	6	–	10	.375	13	–	18	.419
Loyola Marymount	5	–	11	.313	11	–	19	.367
San Diego	4	–	12	.250	9	–	22	.290
Pepperdine	1	–	15	.063	5	–	25	.167
† 2024 WCC tournament winner Rankings from AP poll

The 2023–24 San Francisco Dons women's basketball team represented the University of San Francisco in the 2023–24 NCAA Division I women's basketball season. They were led by eighth-year head coach Molly Goodenbour. The Dons, as members of the West Coast Conference (WCC), played their home games at War Memorial Gymnasium in San Francisco, California. The Dons finished the season 14–16, 10–6 in WCC play, to finish in a tie for third place. They lost in the quarterfinals of the WCC tournament to Pacific.

== Previous season ==
The Dons finished the 2022–23 season 19–13, 9–9 in WCC play, to finish in a tie for fourth place. As the No. 4 seed in the WCC tournament, they lost in the third round to BYU. They were invited to the WNIT where they lost in the first round to Washington.

== Offseason ==
=== Departures ===
San Francisco departures
Name	Num	Pos.	Height	Year	Hometown	Reason for departure
Malia Latu	0	G	5' 8"	Sophomore	East Palo Alto, CA	Transferred to Santa Clara
Loren Christie	1	F	6' 3"	Senior	Hertfordshire, England	Graduate transferred to Xavier
Kia Vaalavirta	2	G	5' 8"	GS Senior	Espoo, Finland	Graduated
Amy Baum	3	G	5' 7"	GS Senior	Melbourne, Australia	Graduated
Jessica McDowell-White	4	G	5' 6"	Senior	Brisbane, Australia	Graduated/signed to play professionally in Australia with Townsville Fire
Amalie Langer	5	G	5' 9"	GS Senior	Rungsted, Denmark	Graduate transferred to Idaho
Kennedy Dickie	12	F	6' 0"	Senior	Kelowna, BC	Graduate transferred to Portland
Ioanna Krimili	21	G	5' 10"	(redshirt) Junior	Heraklion, Greece	Transferred to California
Abby Rathbun	55	G/F	5' 11"	GS Senior	Moses Lake, WA	Graduated

=== Incoming ===
San Francisco incoming transfers
Name	Num	Pos.	Height	Year	Hometown	Previous school
Luana Leite	1	G	5' 7"	Junior	São Paulo, Brazil	South Georgia Tech
Freja Werth	12	G	6' 1"	Junior	Arild, Sweden	Albany
Sol Castro	24	F	6' 1"	Senior	Río Colorado, Argentina	Robert Morris
Seynabou Thiam	25	C	6' 6"	GS Senior	Dakar, Senegal	Tarleton State
Mia Vukšic	44	G	5' 10"	Junior	Šibenik, Croatia	Kansas

==== Recruiting ====
There was no recruiting class of 2023.

== Roster ==
2023–24 San Francisco Dons women's basketball team
Players
Coaches

Pos.	#	Name	Height	Year	Previous school	Hometown
G	1	Luana Leite	5 ft 7 in (1.7 m)	Jr	South Georgia Tech	Porto Feliz, Brazil
G	4	Elle Papahronis	5 ft 11 in (1.8 m)	Fr	Edmond North	Edmond, OK
F	10	Lorena Barbosa	6 ft 5 in (1.96 m)	RS Jr	Glória Azedia Bonetti	Itatiba, Brazil
G	11	Jasmine Gayles	5 ft 7 in (1.7 m)	GS	West Seattle; Northern Colorado	Seattle, WA
G	12	Freja Werth	6 ft 1 in (1.85 m)	Jr	Riksbasketgymansiet Luleå; Albany	Arild, Sweden
F	13	Debora dos Santos	6 ft 0 in (1.83 m)	RS Jr	Wasatch Academy; South Plains College	Rio de Janeiro, Brazil
F	14	Marina Hernandez	6 ft 2 in (1.88 m)	So	Le Fuente San Luis	Alicante, Spain
G	20	Aya Kéita	5 ft 9 in (1.75 m)	Jr	Kazinczy Ferenc Grammar School	Győr, Hungary
G	22	Paula Tirado	5 ft 7 in (1.7 m)	Fr	IES Damià Campeny	Mataró, Spain
F	24	Sol Castro	6 ft 1 in (1.85 m)	Sr	Benito Quinquela Martín; Robert Morris	Río Colorado, Argentina
F	25	Seynabou Thiam	6 ft 6 in (1.98 m)	GS	Galandou Diouf HS; Tarleton State	Dakar, Senegal
G	32	Cami Fulcher	5 ft 8 in (1.73 m)	Jr	West Linn	West Linn, OR
G	44	Mia Vukšic	6 ft 0 in (1.83 m)	Jr	Srednja strukovna škola Kansas	Šibenik, Croatia

Head coach

- Molly Goodenbour (Stanford)

Assistant coach(es)

- Janell Jones (Oklahoma Christian)
- Chris Straker
- Derek Saich (UC Santa Barbara)

Legend

- (C) Team captain
- (S) Suspended
- (I) Ineligible
- (W) Walk-on
- Injured
- Current redshirt

Roster
Last update: October 3, 2024

== Schedule and results ==
Date time, TV	Rank^{#}	Opponent^{#}	Result	Record	High points	High rebounds	High assists	Site (attendance) city, state
Exhibition
November 3, 2023*; 5:00 p.m.		Chico State	Canceled					War Memorial Gymnasium; San Francisco, CA
Non-conference regular season
November 7, 2023*; 7:00 p.m., ESPN+		at UC Santa Barbara	L 75–87	0–1	13 – Gayles	12 – dos Santos	5 – Gayles	The Thunderdome (428); Santa Barbara, CA
November 9, 2023*; 4:00 p.m., ESPN+		Stanislaus State	W 92–70	1–1	21 – Gayles	13 – dos Santos	3 – tied	War Memorial Gymnasium (806); San Francisco, CA
November 13, 2023*; 6:00 p.m.		at Arizona State	L 69–77	1–2	18 – Fulcher	9 – dos Santos	9 – Leite	Desert Financial Arena (1,397); Tempe, AZ
November 17, 2023*; 4:30 p.m., ESPN+		at Hawaii; Bank of Hawaii Classic	L 51–65	1–3	16 – Gayles	9 – Fulcher	4 – Leite	Stan Sheriff Center (1,355); Honolulu, HI
November 19, 2023*; 4:30 p.m.		vs. Cal State Fullerton; Bank of Hawaii Classic	L 48–54	1–4	11 – Fulcher	8 – tied	5 – Gayles	Stan Sheriff Center; Honolulu, HI
November 21, 2023*; 4:00 p.m., ESPN+		Yale	W 75–59	2–4	25 – dos Santos	10 – dos Santos	5 – Gayles	War Memorial Gymnasium; San Francisco, CA
November 26, 2023*; 2:30 p.m., ESPN+		Colorado State	L 53–62	2–5	14 – dos Santos	13 – dos Santos	4 – Tirado	Chase Center; San Francisco, CA
December 2, 2023*; 1:00 p.m.		at Washington	L 39–63	2–6	9 – Vukšic	5 – tied	2 – tied	Alaska Airlines Arena (2,011); Seattle, WA
December 9, 2023*; 2:00 p.m., ESPN+		Northern Arizona	L 76–92	2–7	17 – dos Santos	10 – dos Santos	5 – Leite	War Memorial Gymnasium (225); San Francisco, CA
December 16, 2023*; 2:00 p.m., ESPN+		at Portland State	W 74–63	3–7	23 – Leite	17 – dos Santos	4 – tied	Viking Pavilion (367); Portland, OR
December 19, 2023*; 4:00 p.m., ESPN+		at Long Beach State	L 79–81	3–8	21 – Gayles	15 – dos Santos	3 – Leite	Walter Pyramid (547); Long Beach, CA
December 28, 2023*; 6:00 p.m., ESPN+		Columbia	L 67–74	3–9	20 – tied	10 – dos Santos	10 – Leite	War Memorial Gymnasium (348); San Francisco, CA
January 1, 2024*; 1:00 p.m., ESPN+		Brown	W 75–70	4–9	21 – Gayles	12 – Werth	5 – Gayles	War Memorial Gymnasium (348); San Francisco, CA
WCC regular season
January 4, 2024; 4:00 p.m., ESPN+		at Loyola Marymount	W 63–38	5–9 (1–0)	20 – Gayles	18 – dos Santos	4 – tied	Gersten Pavilion (197); Los Angeles, CA
January 6, 2024; 2:00 p.m., ESPN+		Portland	L 60–67	5–10 (1–1)	23 – Gayles	13 – dos Santos	4 – Leite	War Memorial Gymnasium (232); San Francisco, CA
January 11, 2024; 6:00 p.m., ESPN+		Pepperdine	W 83–64	6–10 (2–1)	19 – Werth	11 – dos Santos	4 – Werth	War Memorial Gymnasium (251); San Francisco, CA
January 13, 2024; 2:00 p.m., ESPN+		at Pacific	W 81–68	7–10 (3–1)	40 – Gayles	13 – dos Santos	8 – Leite	Alex G. Spanos Center (471); Stockton, CA
January 20, 2024; 1:00 p.m., ESPN+		at Santa Clara	L 59–72	7–11 (3–2)	17 – Gayles	7 – Barbosa	2 – tied	Leavey Center (352); Santa Clara, CA
January 25, 2024; 6:00 p.m., ESPN+		Loyola Marymount	W 61–48	8–11 (4–2)	17 – Gayles	9 – dos Santos	7 – Leite	War Memorial Gymnasium; San Francisco, CA
January 27, 2024; 2:00 p.m., ESPN+		No. 17 Gonzaga	L 54–73	8–12 (4–3)	14 – Kéita	7 – dos Santos	6 – Gayles	War Memorial Gymnasium; San Francisco, CA
February 1, 2024; 6:00 p.m., ESPN+		at Pepperdine	W 78–54	9–12 (5–3)	24 – dos Santos	12 – dos Santos	6 – Leite	Firestone Fieldhouse (77); Malibu, CA
February 3, 2024; 2:00 p.m., ESPN+		at San Diego	L 66–77	9–13 (5–4)	22 – Gayles	11 – dos Santos	3 – Leite	Jenny Craig Pavilion (314); San Diego, CA
February 8, 2024; 6:00 p.m., ESPN+		Saint Mary's	W 59–54	10–13 (6–4)	16 – Gayles	13 – dos Santos	5 – tied	War Memorial Gymnasium (226); San Francisco, CA
February 10, 2024; 2:00 p.m., ESPN+		Pacific	W 79–72	11–13 (7–4)	15 – Fulcher	9 – Werth	3 – tied	War Memorial Gymnasium (325); San Francisco, CA
February 15, 2024; 6:00 p.m., ESPN+		Santa Clara	L 65–73	11–14 (7–5)	16 – tied	13 – dos Santos	4 – Gayles	War Memorial Gymnasium (315); San Francisco, CA
February 22, 2024; 6:00 p.m., ESPN+		at No. 16 Gonzaga	L 48–74	11–15 (7–6)	14 – Fulcher	5 – tied	4 – Leite	McCarthey Athletic Center (5,415); Spokane, WA
February 24, 2024; 5:00 p.m., ESPN+		at Portland	W 59–47	12–15 (8–6)	16 – tied	15 – dos Santos	5 – Leite	Chiles Center (833); Portland, OR
February 29, 2024; 6:30 p.m., ESPN+		at Saint Mary's	W 78–74 ^{OT}	13–15 (9–6)	29 – dos Santos	12 – dos Santos	11 – Leite	University Credit Union Pavilion (401); Moraga, CA
March 2, 2024; 2:00 p.m., ESPN+		San Diego	W 68–66	14–15 (10–6)	25 – dos Santos	9 – Fulcher	9 – Leite	War Memorial Gymnasium (578); San Francisco, CA
WCC women's tournament
March 9, 2024; 1:00 p.m., ESPN+	(4)	vs. (5) Pacific; Quarterfinals	L 71–76	14–16	21 – dos Santos	11 – dos Santos	5 – Leite	Orleans Arena (1,387); Paradise, NV
*Non-conference game. ^{#}Rankings from AP poll. (#) Tournament seedings in parentheses. All times are in Pacific.

== See also ==
- 2023–24 San Francisco Dons men's basketball team
