= 2023–24 Loyola Marymount Lions women's basketball team =

American college basketball season

2023–24 Loyola Marymount Lions women's basketball
- Conference: West Coast Conference
- Record: 11–19 (5–11 WCC)
- Head coach: Aarika Hughes (3rd season)
- Assistant coaches: Daisy Feder; Lauren Unger
- Home arena: Gersten Pavilion

2023–24 West Coast Conference women's basketball standings
	Conf.				Overall
Team	W		L	PCT	W		L	PCT
No. 14 Gonzaga	16	–	0	1.000	32	–	4	.889
Santa Clara	12	–	4	.750	25	–	9	.735
Portland †	10	–	6	.625	21	–	13	.618
San Francisco	10	–	6	.625	14	–	16	.467
Pacific	8	–	8	.500	18	–	15	.545
Saint Mary's	6	–	10	.375	13	–	18	.419
Loyola Marymount	5	–	11	.313	11	–	19	.367
San Diego	4	–	12	.250	9	–	22	.290
Pepperdine	1	–	15	.063	5	–	25	.167
† 2024 WCC tournament winner Rankings from AP poll

The 2023–24 Loyola Marymount Lions women's basketball team represented the Loyola Marymount University in the 2023–24 NCAA Division I women's basketball season. The Lions, led by third-year coach Aarika Hughes, played their home games at Gersten Pavilion and were members of the West Coast Conference.

== Previous season ==
The Lions finished the 2022–23 season 7–23, 4–14 in WCC play to finish in last place. As the No. 10 seed in the WCC tournament, they lost to Saint Mary's in the first round.

== Offseason ==
=== Departures ===
Loyola Marymount departures
Name	Num	Pos.	Height	Year	Hometown	Reason for departure
Cassandra Gordon	2	G	5'10"	GS senior	Santa Barbara, CA	Graduated
Se'Quoia Allmond	3	G	5'5"	Sophomore	South Memphis, TN	Transferred to Southern Illinois
Kimora Sykes	4	F	6'0"	(redshirt) Junior	Fontana, CA	Transferred
Destiny Samuel	11	F	6'2"	GS senior	Queens, NY	Graduated
Aspyn Adams	25	G	5'8"	Senior	Colbert, WA	Graduated
Ariel Johnson	32	G	5'9"	GS senior	Tracy, CA	Graduated
Khari Clark	34	F/C	6'2"	Senior	Denver, CO	Graduate transferred to Stony Brook

=== Incoming ===
Loyola Marymount incoming transfers
Name	Num	Pos.	Height	Year	Hometown	Previous school
Da'Ja Hamilton	0	G	5'8"	GS senior	Rancho Cucamonga, CA	Nevada
Cynthia Ezeja	4	F	6'2"	(redshirt) Senior	Athens, Greece	Pittsburgh
Daylee Dunn	10	G	5'10"	Senior	San Ramon, CA	Fresno State
Soufia Inoussa	11	G	5'7"	GS senior	Stockholm, Sweden	New Mexico State
Sydney Gandy	14	G	5'5"	Senior	Long Beach, CA	Idaho

==== Recruiting ====
There was no recruiting class of 2023.

== Roster ==
2023–24 Loyola Marymount Lions women's basketball team
Players
Coaches

Pos.	#	Name	Height	Year	Previous school	Hometown
G	0	Da'Ja Hamilton	5 ft 8 in (1.73 m)	GS	Etiwanda; Nevada	Rancho Cucamonga, CA
G	2	Mari Somvichian	5 ft 4 in (1.63 m)	Fr	Oakland Tech	Oakland, CA
G	3	Ella Wedin	6 ft 1 in (1.85 m)	Fr	La Salle	Happy Valley, OR
F	4	Cynthia Ezeja	6 ft 2 in (1.88 m)	RS Sr	20th High School of Athens; Pittsburgh	Athens, Greece
G	5	Daylee Dunn	5 ft 10 in (1.78 m)	Sr	Salesian Prep; Fresno State	Fresno, CA
F	10	Amaya Oliver	6 ft 2 in (1.88 m)	Sr	St. Mary's; USC	Richmond, CA
G	11	Soufia Inoussa	5 ft 8 in (1.73 m)	Sr	Solna Gymnasium; New Mexico State	Stockholm, Sweden
G	14	Sydney Gandy	5 ft 8 in (1.73 m)	Sr	Orangewood Academy; Idaho	Long Beach, CA
G	17	Nicole Rodriguez	5 ft 8 in (1.73 m)	Sr	Rosary Academy	Eastvale, CA
G	21	Noelle Yancy	5 ft 10 in (1.78 m)	Sr	Richardson; Trinity Valley CC	Dallas, TX
F	22	Ava Toone	6 ft 1 in (1.85 m)	Jr	IMG Academy	Brooklyn, NY
G	23	Layla Curry	5 ft 9 in (1.75 m)	So	Centennial	Corona, CA
G/F	25	Amelie Sitterud	6 ft 1 in (1.85 m)	Fr	Tahoma	Kirkland, WA
F	35	Alexis Mark	5 ft 11 in (1.8 m)	Sr	Sierra Canyon; Boise State	Chatsworth, CA
F	55	Maya Hernandez	6 ft 0 in (1.83 m)	Fr	Archbishop Mitty	San Jose, CA

Head coach

- Aarika Hughes (USC)

Assistant coach(es)

- Daisy Feder (UC San Diego)
- Lauren Unger (UT Permian Basin)

Legend

- (C) Team captain
- (S) Suspended
- (I) Ineligible
- (W) Walk-on
- Injured
- Current redshirt

Roster

== Schedule and results ==
Date time, TV	Rank^{#}	Opponent^{#}	Result	Record	High points	High rebounds	High assists	Site (attendance) city, state
Non-conference regular season
November 6, 2023*; 7:00 p.m., ESPN+		UNLV	L 62–72	0–1	13 – Inoussa	8 – Mark	4 – Gandy	Gersten Pavilion (517); Los Angeles, CA
November 12, 2023*; 1:00 p.m.		at Arizona	L 54–70	0–2	18 – Hamilton	16 – Oliver	2 – Tied	McKale Center (6,784); Tucson, AZ
November 16, 2023*; 6:00 p.m., ESPN+		Biola	W 66–36	1–2	14 – Rodriguez	12 – Mark	6 – Gandy	Gersten Pavilion (248); Los Angeles, CA
November 19, 2023*; 2:00 p.m., ESPN+		San Jose State	L 53–61	1–3	12 – Mark	8 – Mark	3 – Gandy	Gersten Pavilion (483); Los Angeles, CA
November 25, 2023*; 1:00 p.m., ESPN+		at BYU	L 58–74	1–4	10 – Oliver	4 – Tied	4 – Gandy	Marriott Center (1,529); Provo, UT
November 30, 2023*; 6:00 p.m., ESPN+		Denver	W 79–61	2–4	24 – Mark	11 – Inoussa	6 – Hamilton	Gersten Pavilion (249); Los Angeles, CA
December 3, 2023*; 6:00 p.m., ESPN+		South Dakota	L 73–78 ^{OT}	2–5	20 – Mark	10 – Mark	5 – Gandy	Gersten Pavilion (218); Los Angeles, CA
December 6, 2023*; 10:00 a.m., ESPN+		at Montana	L 68–82	2–6	19 – Oliver	9 – Mark	5 – Gandy	Dahlberg Arena (5,911); Missoula, MT
December 10, 2023*; 2:00 p.m., ESPN+		The Master's (CA)	W 58–46	3–6	14 – Rodriguez	16 – Oliver	3 – Gandy	Gersten Pavilion (202); Los Angeles, CA
December 17, 2023*; 4:00 p.m., ESPN+		at UC Santa Barbara	W 64–57	4–6	16 – Gandy	7 – Mark	4 – Mark	The Thunderdome (424); Santa Barbara, CA
December 21, 2023*; 1:00 p.m., ESPN+		at Cal State Northridge	W 77–74	5–6	19 – Inoussa	8 – Mark	8 – Gandy	Premier America Credit Union Arena (135); Northridge, CA
December 30, 2023*; 12:00 p.m., ESPN+		at Lamar	L 58–61	5–7	12 – Oliver	11 – Oliver	4 – Gandy	Montagne Center (539); Beaumont, TX
WCC regular season
January 4, 2024; 4:00 p.m., ESPN+		San Francisco	L 38–63	5–8 (0–1)	18 – Mark	6 – Mark	3 – Gandy	Gersten Pavilion (197); Los Angeles, CA
January 6, 2024; 2:00 p.m., ESPN+		at Pepperdine	W 64–50	6–8 (1–1)	13 – Hamilton	10 – Mark	6 – Inoussa	Firestone Fieldhouse (202); Malibu, CA
January 11, 2024; 6:00 p.m., ESPN+		at Pacific	L 54–75	6–9 (1–2)	19 – Mark	8 – Oliver	3 – Gandy	Alex G. Spanos Center (418); Stockton, CA
January 13, 2024; 5:00 p.m., ESPN+		at Saint Mary's	W 66–48	7–9 (2–2)	18 – Mark	11 – Mark	3 – Tied	University Credit Union Pavilion (443); Moraga, CA
January 18, 2024; 7:00 p.m., ESPN+		No. 17 Gonzaga	L 48–72	7–10 (2–3)	12 – Hernandez	9 – Mark	6 – Gandy	Gersten Pavilion (356); Los Angeles, CA
January 20, 2024; 2:00 p.m., ESPN+		San Diego	W 67–60	8–10 (3–3)	20 – Mark	6 – Mark	6 – Tied	Gersten Pavilion (289); Los Angeles, CA
January 25, 2024; 6:00 p.m., ESPN+		at San Francisco	L 48–61	8–11 (3–4)	11 – Oliver	8 – Mark	3 – Hamilton	War Memorial Gymnasium; San Francisco, CA
January 27, 2024; 2:00 p.m., ESPN+		Pepperdine	W 75–59	9–11 (4–4)	14 – Tied	8 – Mark	3 – Tied	Gersten Pavilion (231); Los Angeles, CA
February 1, 2024; 7:00 p.m., ESPN+		Santa Clara	L 49–63	9–12 (4–5)	11 – Tied	4 – Tied	4 – Gandy	Gersten Pavilion (235); Los Angeles, CA
February 8, 2024; 6:00 p.m., ESPN+		at Portland	L 52–58	9–13 (4–6)	13 – Rodriguez	12 – Mark	4 – Mark	Chiles Center (477); Portland, OR
February 10, 2024; 2:00 p.m., ESPN+		at No. 19 Gonzaga	L 47–71	9–14 (4–7)	10 – Inoussa	5 – Mark	3 – Gandy	McCarthey Athletic Center (5,442); Spokane, WA
February 17, 2024; 2:00 p.m., ESPN+		at San Diego	L 50–66	9–15 (4–8)	11 – Gandy	6 – Mark	2 – Tied	Jenny Craig Pavilion (631); San Diego, CA
February 22, 2024; 7:00 p.m., ESPN+		Saint Mary's	L 66–70	9–16 (4–9)	18 – Oliver	8 – Mark	8 – Gandy	Gersten Pavilion (326); Los Angeles, CA
February 24, 2024; 2:00 p.m., ESPN+		Pacific	W 80–71	10–16 (5–9)	22 – Tied	7 – Mark	8 – Gandy	Gersten Pavilion (375); Los Angeles, CA
February 29, 2024; 6:00 p.m., ESPN+		at Santa Clara	L 45–86	10–17 (5–10)	19 – Mark	6 – Oliver	3 – Oliver	Leavey Center (551); Santa Clara, CA
March 2, 2024; 4:00 p.m., ESPN+		Portland	L 63–75	10–18 (5–11)	17 – Mark	8 – Mark	9 – Gandy	Gersten Pavilion (603); Los Angeles, CA
WCC women's tournament
March 8, 2024; 2:30 p.m., ESPN+	(7)	vs. (6) Saint Mary's; Second Round	W 78–62	11–18	26 – Rodriguez	11 – Mark	5 – Rodriguez	Orleans Arena (971); Paradise, NV
March 9, 2024; 3:30 p.m., ESPN+	(7)	vs. (3) Portland; Quarterfinals	L 51–78	11–19	14 – Tied	5 – Tied	3 – Gandy	Orleans Arena (1,387); Paradise, NV
*Non-conference game. ^{#}Rankings from AP Poll. (#) Tournament seedings in parentheses. All times are in Pacific Time.

== See also ==
- 2023–24 Loyola Marymount Lions men's basketball team
