= 2023–24 Pepperdine Waves women's basketball team =

American college basketball season

2023–24 Pepperdine Waves women's basketball
- Conference: West Coast Conference
- Record: 5–25 (1–15 WCC)
- Head coach: Kelsey Keizer (interim)
- Assistant coaches: Shawn Faust; Monique' Jones; Amaka Uzomah
- Home arena: Firestone Fieldhouse

2023–24 West Coast Conference women's basketball standings
	Conf.				Overall
Team	W		L	PCT	W		L	PCT
No. 14 Gonzaga	16	–	0	1.000	32	–	4	.889
Santa Clara	12	–	4	.750	25	–	9	.735
Portland †	10	–	6	.625	21	–	13	.618
San Francisco	10	–	6	.625	14	–	16	.467
Pacific	8	–	8	.500	18	–	15	.545
Saint Mary's	6	–	10	.375	13	–	18	.419
Loyola Marymount	5	–	11	.313	11	–	19	.367
San Diego	4	–	12	.250	9	–	22	.290
Pepperdine	1	–	15	.063	5	–	25	.167
† 2024 WCC tournament winner Rankings from AP poll

The 2023–24 Pepperdine Waves women's basketball team represented Pepperdine University in the 2023–24 NCAA Division I women's basketball season. The Waves, led by interim head coach Kelsey Keizer, played their home games at Firestone Fieldhouse and were members of the West Coast Conference.

== Previous season ==
The Waves finished the 2022–23 season 11–19, 5–13 in WCC play to finish in ninth place. As the No. 9 seed in the WCC tournament, they lost in the second round to BYU.

== Offseason ==
=== Departures ===
Pepperdine departures
Name	Num	Pos.	Height	Year	Hometown	Reason for departure
Theresa Grace Mbane	0	F	6'1"	GS senior	Otsego, MN	Graduated
Hailey Hoff	2	G	5'9"	Freshman	San Bruno, CA	Transferred to Dominican
Drea Brumfield	3	F	6'2"	Freshman	Chehalis, WA	Transferred to Montana State
Rosemary Odebunmi	4	F	6'0"	(redshirt) Sophomore	Ado-Ekiti, Nigeria	Transferred to West Texas A&M
Isabel Montoya	5	G	5'5"	(redshirt) Junior	Española, NM	Student assistant coach
Marly Walls	12	G	5'7"	GS senior	Bardstown, KY	Graduated
Meaali'i Amosa	13	F	6'1"	Sophomore	Garden Grove, CA	Transferred to UC San Diego
Becky Obinma	15	F	6'2'	(redshirt) Senior	Menifee, CA	Graduate transferred to Notre Dame
Kendyl Carson	22	G	6'0"	Junior	Juneau, AK	TBD
Ally Stedman	24	G	5'9"	Sophomore	Phoenix, AZ	Transferred to Miami (FL)

=== Incoming ===
Pepperdine incoming transfers
Name	Num	Pos.	Height	Year	Hometown	Previous school
Addison Melone	0	G	5'3"	Junior	Las Vegas, NV	Eastern Arizona College
Ella Brubaker	3	G	6'0"	Junior	University Place, WA	The Master's
Mi'Cole Cayton	5	G	5'9"	GS senior	Stockton, CA	Minnesota
Emerita Mashaire	13	G/F	6'0"	Junior	Helsinki, Finland	Buffalo
Myra Gordon	15	G/F	6'0"	GS senior	Fort Worth, TX	Alabama
Megan Harkey	31	F/C	6'6"	Senior	Summerfield, NC	Xavier
Maggie Vick	32	F	6'2"	Junior	Morristown, TN	Iowa State
Alexis Griggsby	35	G	5'9"	GS senior	Northridge, CA	Washington

==== Recruiting ====
There was no recruiting class of 2023.

== Roster ==
2023–24 Pepperdine Waves women's basketball team
Players
Coaches

Pos.	#	Name	Height	Year	Previous school	Hometown
G	0	Addi Melone	5 ft 3 in (1.6 m)	Jr	Centennial; Eastern Arizona College	Las Vegas, NV
G	1	Hailey Johnson	5 ft 11 in (1.8 m)	RS Fr	JSerra Catholic	Coto de Caza, CA
G	3	Ella Brubaker	6 ft 0 in (1.83 m)	Jr	Curtis Sr. The Master's (CA)	University Place, WA
G	5	Mi'Cole Cayton	5 ft 9 in (1.75 m)	GS	St. Mary's; Minnesota	Stockton, CA
F	10	Jane Nwaba	5 ft 10 in (1.78 m)	Sr	Palisades Charter	Carson, CA
G	11	Helena Friend	6 ft 0 in (1.83 m)	Jr	Blair Academy	Huntington Beach, CA
F	12	Holly Griffiths	6 ft 4 in (1.93 m)	Fr	Our Lady of Mercy College	Melbourne, Australia
G	13	Emerita Mashaire	6 ft 0 in (1.83 m)	Jr	HBA-Marsky; Buffalo	Helsinki, Finland
G/F	15	Myra Gordon	6 ft 0 in (1.83 m)	GS	L. D. Bell; Alabama	Fort Worth, TX
F	24	Jorynn Ross	6 ft 3 in (1.91 m)	Fr	Summer Creek	Milwaukee, WI
F/C	31	Megan Harkey	6 ft 6 in (1.98 m)	Sr	Northwest Guilford; Xavier	Summerfield, NC
F	32	Maggie Vick	6 ft 2 in (1.88 m)	Jr	Lakeway Christian (TN); Iowa State	Morristown, TN
C	33	KK Brodie	6 ft 3 in (1.91 m)	So	Rock Bridge	Columbia, MO
G	35	Alexis Griggsby	5 ft 9 in (1.75 m)	GS	Sierra Canyon; Washington	Northridge, CA

Head coach

- Kelsey Keizer (interim) (Drake)

Assistant coach(es)

- Shawn Faust (West Florida)
- Monique' Jones (Drake)
- Amaka Uzomah (Colorado State)

Legend

- (C) Team captain
- (S) Suspended
- (I) Ineligible
- (W) Walk-on
- Injured
- Current redshirt

Roster

== Schedule and results ==
Date time, TV	Rank^{#}	Opponent^{#}	Result	Record	High points	High rebounds	High assists	Site (attendance) city, state
Exhibition
November 3, 2023*; 6:00 p.m.		Biola	W 56–50		–	–	–	Firestone Fieldhouse; Malibu, CA
Non-conference regular season
November 7, 2023*; 6:00 p.m., ESPN+		UC Irvine	W 63–58	1–0	17 – Gordon	11 – Nwaba	5 – Gordon	Firestone Fieldhouse (237); Malibu, CA
November 9, 2023*; 6:00 p.m., ESPN+		New Mexico	L 48–57	1–1	15 – Nwaba	11 – Nwaba	6 – Nwaba	Firestone Fieldhouse (113); Malibu, CA
November 11, 2023*; 6:00 p.m., ESPN+		Caltech	W 79–42	2–1	10 – Tied	9 – Nwaba	4 – Tied	Firestone Fieldhouse (102); Malibu, CA
November 15, 2023*; 5:00 p.m., MW Network		at Fresno State	L 55–74	2–2	14 – Gordon	5 – Tied	2 – Tied	Save Mart Center; Fresno, CA
November 17, 2023*; 6:30 p.m., MW Network		at Nevada	L 41–64	2–3	9 – Gordon	6 – Vick	2 – Tied	Lawlor Events Center (1,022); Reno, NV
November 20, 2023*; 5:30 p.m., MW Network		at Boise State	L 47–63	2–4	19 – Brubaker	7 – Brodie	4 – Melone	ExtraMile Arena (1,558); Boise, ID
November 24, 2023*; 6:00 p.m., ESPN+		Georgetown	L 40–59	2–5	10 – Brubaker	8 – Brodie	3 – Tied	Firestone Fieldhouse (173); Malibu, CA
November 27, 2023*; 6:00 p.m., ESPN+		Long Beach State	L 53–68	2–6	11 – Brubaker	9 – Gordon	3 – Tied	Firestone Fieldhouse (103); Malibu, CA
December 1, 2023*; 4:30 p.m., ESPN+		at North Texas	L 57–74	2–7	13 – Tied	11 – Nwaba	4 – Melone	The Super Pit (1,549); Denton, TX
December 9, 2023*; 2:00 p.m., ESPN+		California Baptist	L 57–60	2–8	13 – Brubaker	11 – Nwaba	2 – Tied	Firestone Fieldhouse (184); Malibu, CA
December 16, 2023*; 1:00 p.m., ESPN+		at Cal State Bakersfield	W 80–60	3–8	20 – Brubaker	11 – Nwaba	7 – Mashaire	Icardo Center (386); Bakersfield, CA
December 18, 2023*; 2:00 p.m., ESPN+		Northern Arizona	L 62–80	3–9	16 – Ross	7 – Ross	4 – Nwaba	Firestone Fieldhouse (160); Malibu, CA
December 29, 2023*; 2:00 p.m., ESPN+		Cal State Los Angeles	W 78–70	4–9	18 – Nwaba	12 – Nwaba	3 – Ross	Firestone Fieldhouse (172); Malibu, CA
WCC regular season
January 4, 2024; 4:30 p.m., ESPN+		at San Diego	W 53–52	5–9 (1–0)	14 – Nwaba	12 – Nwaba	3 – Ross	Jenny Craig Pavilion (235); San Diego, CA
January 6, 2024; 2:00 p.m., ESPN+		Loyola Marymount	L 50–64	5–10 (1–1)	10 – Tied	7 – Nwaba	4 – Melone	Firestone Fieldhouse (202); Malibu, CA
January 11, 2024; 6:00 p.m., ESPN+		at San Francisco	L 64–83	5–11 (1–2)	11 – Nwaba	8 – Nwaba	8 – Nwaba	War Memorial Gymnasium (251); San Francisco, CA
January 18, 2024; 6:00 p.m., ESPN+		at Santa Clara	L 36–92	5–12 (1–3)	10 – Harkey	6 – Ross	2 – Melone	Leavey Center (342); Santa Clara, CA
January 20, 2024; 6:00 p.m., ESPN+		at Pacific	L 49–72	5–13 (1–4)	13 – Ross	9 – Nwaba	6 – Nwaba	Alex G. Spanos Center (777); Stockton, CA
January 25, 2024; 6:00 p.m., ESPN+		Portland	L 49–82	5–14 (1–5)	14 – Griffiths	5 – Tied	7 – Nwaba	Firestone Fieldhouse (158); Malibu, CA
January 27, 2024; 2:00 p.m., ESPN+		at Loyola Marymount	L 59–75	5–15 (1–6)	13 – Nwaba	12 – Nwaba	2 – Tied	Gersten Pavilion (231); Los Angeles, CA
February 1, 2024; 6:00 p.m., ESPN+		San Francisco	L 54–78	5–16 (1–7)	22 – Nwaba	6 – Tied	4 – Nwaba	Firestone Fieldhouse (77); Malibu, CA
February 3, 2024; 2:00 p.m., ESPN+		Santa Clara	L 58–79	5–17 (1–8)	12 – Mashaire	5 – Tied	3 – Friend	Firestone Fieldhouse (202); Moraga, CA
February 8, 2024; 6:00 p.m., ESPN+		at No. 19 Gonzaga	L 46–83	5–18 (1–9)	11 – Nwaba	9 – Nwaba	2 – Tied	McCarthey Athletic Center (4,921); Spokane, WA
February 10, 2024; 3:00 p.m., ESPN+		at Portland	L 46–78	5–19 (1–10)	14 – Nwaba	8 – Nwaba	4 – Tied	Chiles Center (816); Portland, OR
February 15, 2024; 6:00 p.m., ESPN+		San Diego	L 49–69	5–20 (1–11)	16 – Nwaba	6 – Tied	4 – Nwaba	Firestone Fieldhouse (103); Malibu, CA
February 17, 2024; 5:00 p.m., ESPN+		at Saint Mary's	L 47–75	5–21 (1–12)	13 – Nwaba	10 – Tied	4 – Nwaba	University Credit Union Pavilion (472); Moraga, CA
February 22, 2024; 6:00 p.m., ESPN+		Pacific	L 54–70	5–22 (1–13)	13 – Friend	10 – Nwaba	2 – Johnson	Firestone Fieldhouse (102); Malibu, CA
February 24, 2024; 2:00 p.m., ESPN+		No. 16 Gonzaga	L 41–75	5–23 (1–14)	13 – Nwaba	10 – Nwaba	3 – Cayton	Firestone Fieldhouse (103); Malibu, CA
March 2, 2024; 2:00 p.m., ESPN+		Saint Mary's	L 48–69	5–24 (1–15)	12 – Tied	5 – Tied	3 – Tied	Firestone Fieldhouse (213); Malibu, CA
WCC women's tournament
March 7, 2024; 12:00 p.m., ESPN+	(9)	vs. (8) San Diego; First Round	L 64–79	5–25	18 – Nwaba	9 – Harkey	5 – Cayton	Orleans Arena (513); Paradise, NV
*Non-conference game. ^{#}Rankings from AP Poll. (#) Tournament seedings in parentheses. All times are in Pacific Time.

== See also ==
- 2023–24 Pepperdine Waves men's basketball team
