= 2024 West Coast Conference women's basketball tournament =

- Classification: Division I
- Season: 2023–24
- Teams: 9
- Site: Orleans Arena; Paradise, Nevada
- Champions: Portland (4th title)
- Winning coach: Michael Meek (3rd title)
- MVP: Kennedy Dickie (Portland)
- Television: ESPN+, ESPNU

2023–24 West Coast Conference women's basketball standings
	Conf.				Overall
Team	W		L	PCT	W		L	PCT
No. 14 Gonzaga	16	–	0	1.000	32	–	4	.889
Santa Clara	12	–	4	.750	25	–	9	.735
Portland †	10	–	6	.625	21	–	13	.618
San Francisco	10	–	6	.625	14	–	16	.467
Pacific	8	–	8	.500	18	–	15	.545
Saint Mary's	6	–	10	.375	13	–	18	.419
Loyola Marymount	5	–	11	.313	11	–	19	.367
San Diego	4	–	12	.250	9	–	22	.290
Pepperdine	1	–	15	.063	5	–	25	.167
† 2024 WCC tournament winner Rankings from AP poll

The 2024 West Coast Conference women's basketball Tournament is the postseason women's basketball tournament for the West Coast Conference for the 2023–24 season. All tournament games will be played at Orleans Arena in the Las Vegas-area community of Paradise, Nevada, from March 7–12, 2024.

== Seeds ==
All nine conference teams participate in the tournament. Teams are seeded by record within the conference, with a tiebreaker system to seed teams with identical conference records. The tiebreakers operate in the following order:

1. Head-to-head record
2. Record against the top-seeded team not involved in the tie, going down through the standings until the tie is broken
3. NET rating after the final regular-season conference games on February 25

Seed	School	Conf. record	Tiebreaker(s)
1	Gonzaga	16–0	
2	Santa Clara	12–4	
3	Portland	10–6	1–1 vs. Santa Clara
4	San Francisco	10–6	0–2 vs. Santa Clara
5	Pacific	8–8	
6	Saint Mary's	6–10	
7	Loyola Marymount	5–11	
8	San Diego	4–12	
9	Pepperdine	1–15	

== Schedule and results ==
Game	Time	Matchup	Score	Television
First Round - Thursday, March 7
1	12:00 pm	No. 8 San Diego vs. No. 9 Pepperdine	79−64	ESPN+
Second Round - Friday, March 8
2	12:00 pm	No. 5 Pacific vs. No. 8 San Diego	72−66	ESPN+
3	2:30 pm	No. 6 Saint Mary's vs. No. 7 Loyola Marymount	62−78	ESPN+
Quarterfinals – Saturday, March 9
4	1:00 pm	No. 4 San Francisco vs. No. 5 Pacific	71−76	ESPN+
5	3:30 pm	No. 3 Portland vs. No. 7 Loyola Marymount	78−51	ESPN+
Semifinals - Monday, March 11
6	12:00 pm	No. 1 Gonzaga vs. No. 5 Pacific	72−61	ESPN+
7	2:30 pm	No. 2 Santa Clara vs. No. 3 Portland	61−63	ESPN+
Final – Tuesday, March 12
8	1:00 pm	No. 1 Gonzaga vs. No. 3 Portland	66–67	ESPNU
*Game times in PST. Rankings denote tournament seed. Reference:

== Bracket ==
First round Thursday, March 7
8	San Diego	79
9	Pepperdine	64

Second round Friday, March 8
6	Saint Mary's	62
7	Loyola Marymount	78
5	Pacific	72
8	San Diego	66

Quarterfinals; Saturday, March 9
3	Portland	78
7	Loyola Marymount	51
4	San Francisco	71
5	Pacific	76

Semifinals; Monday, March 11
2	Santa Clara	61
3	Portland	63
1	Gonzaga	72
5	Pacific	61

Championship; Tuesday, March 12
3	Portland	67
1	Gonzaga	66
