= 2023–24 Pacific Tigers women's basketball team =

American college basketball season

2023–24 Pacific Tigers women's basketball

WNIT, second round
- Conference: West Coast Conference
- Record: 19–15 (8–8 WCC)
- Head coach: Bradley Davis (8th season)
- Associate head coach: Amy Starr
- Assistant coaches: Amanda Brown; Jovana Subasic
- Home arena: Alex G. Spanos Center

2023–24 West Coast Conference women's basketball standings
	Conf.				Overall
Team	W		L	PCT	W		L	PCT
No. 14 Gonzaga	16	–	0	1.000	32	–	4	.889
Santa Clara	12	–	4	.750	25	–	9	.735
Portland †	10	–	6	.625	21	–	13	.618
San Francisco	10	–	6	.625	14	–	16	.467
Pacific	8	–	8	.500	18	–	15	.545
Saint Mary's	6	–	10	.375	13	–	18	.419
Loyola Marymount	5	–	11	.313	11	–	19	.367
San Diego	4	–	12	.250	9	–	22	.290
Pepperdine	1	–	15	.063	5	–	25	.167
† 2024 WCC tournament winner Rankings from AP poll

The 2023–24 Pacific Tigers women's basketball team represented University of the Pacific in the 2023–24 NCAA Division I women's basketball season. The Tigers, led by eighth-year head coach Bradley Davis, were members of the West Coast Conference (WCC) and played their home games at the Alex G. Spanos Center in Stockton, California. They finished the season 18–15, 8–8 in WCC play, to finish in fifth place.

== Previous season ==
The Tigers finished the 2022–23 season 15–17, 8–10 in WCC play, to finish in sixth place. As the No. 6 seed in the WCC tournament, they defeated Saint Mary's in the second round and San Diego in the quarterfinals before losing in the semifinals to Portland.

== Offseason ==
=== Departures ===
Pacific departures
Name	Num	Pos.	Height	Year	Hometown	Reason for departure
Cassidy Johnson	0	C	6' 5"	(redshirt) Junior	Lehi, UT	Transferred to Cal State Bakersfield
Diamond Richardson	5	G	5' 9"	Sophomore	Sacramento, CA	Transferred to Cal Poly
Erica Adams	20	G	5' 10"	Junior	Oakland, CA	Transferred to Cal State Northridge
Sam Ashby	30	G/F	5' 9"	Senior	Perth, Australia	Graduated

=== Incoming ===
Pacific incoming transfers
Name	Num	Pos.	Height	Year	Hometown	Previous school
Lauren Glazier	25	F/C	6' 4"	Sophomore	North Bend, WA	Washington State

==== Recruiting ====
There was no recruiting class of 2023.

== Roster ==
2023–24 Pacific Tigers women's basketball team
Players
Coaches

Pos.	#	Name	Height	Year	Previous school	Hometown
C	00	Endigo Parker	6 ft 4 in (1.93 m)	Jr	Troy; Mt. San Antonio College	Fullerton, CA
G	1	Kadie Deaton	5 ft 11 in (1.8 m)	Sr	Wausau West; North Dakota State	Wausau, WI
G	2	Josephine Millard	6 ft 2 in (1.88 m)	GS	Academy of Nancy-Metz	Nancy, France
G	3	Anaya James	5 ft 9 in (1.75 m)	Jr	West	Inglewood, CA
F	4	Rosie Schweizer	6 ft 1 in (1.85 m)	RS Sr	Canberra Girls Grammar School; George Mason	Canberra, Australia
G	5	Stella Szabo	5 ft 11 in (1.8 m)	Fr	Luleå Gymnasieskola	Stockholm, Sweden
G	10	Sydney Ward	6 ft 0 in (1.83 m)	So	The Village	Houston, TX
F	11	Cecilia Holmberg	6 ft 2 in (1.88 m)	GS	BG Luleå; St. John's	Bjärred, Sweden
C	14	Elizabeth Elliott	6 ft 1 in (1.85 m)	Jr	St. Mary's Academy (CA)	Inglewood, CA
G	15	Nyah Lowery	5 ft 11 in (1.8 m)	Fr	St. Mary's Parish School	Sacramento, CA
F	22	Jamie Kent	6 ft 0 in (1.83 m)	Fr	Carondelet	Dublin, CA
G	23	Kenlee Durrill	5 ft 10 in (1.78 m)	Fr	Flatirons Academy	Denver, CO
G	24	Liz Smith	5 ft 9 in (1.75 m)	Sr	IMG Academy	Dallas, TX
F	25	Lauren Glazier	6 ft 4 in (1.93 m)	So	Mount Si; Washington State	North Bend, WA
F	33	Madelene Ennis	5 ft 11 in (1.8 m)	GS	St. Ignatius College Prep	Burlingame, CA

Head coach

- Bradley Davis (California)

Assistant coach(es)

- Amy Starr (Washington State)
- Amanda Brown (Gonzaga)
- Jovana Subasic (Oregon State)

Legend

- (C) Team captain
- (S) Suspended
- (I) Ineligible
- (W) Walk-on
- Injured
- Current redshirt

Roster
Last update: November 13, 2024

== Schedule and results ==
Date time, TV	Rank^{#}	Opponent^{#}	Result	Record	High points	High rebounds	High assists	Site (attendance) city, state
Non-conference regular season
November 10, 2023*; 6:00 p.m., ESPN+		Cal State Fullerton	W 73–57	1–0	16 – Smith	6 – tied	7 – Smith	Alex G. Spanos Center (1,002); Stockton, CA
November 12, 2023*; 2:00 p.m., ESPN+		Cal State Bakersfield	W 67–54	2–0	21 – Smith	7 – tied	7 – Smith	Alex G. Spanos Center (642); Stockton, CA
November 15, 2023*; 7:00 p.m.		at Washington	L 64–81	2–1	16 – James	8 – James	5 – James	Alaska Airlines Arena (1,420); Seattle, WA
November 20, 2023*; 5:00 p.m., ESPN+		Yale	W 66–59	3–1	20 – James	11 – Elliott	5 – Smith	Alex G. Spanos Center (629); Stockton, CA
November 24, 2023*; 3:30 p.m., ESPN+		Butler; Tiger Turkey Tip-Off	W 77–66	4–1	19 – Deaton	8 – Holmberg	8 – James	Alex G. Spanos Center (494); Stockton, CA
November 25, 2023*; 3:30 p.m., ESPN+		UC Irvine; Tiger Turkey Tip-Off	L 60–66	4–2	15 – Holmberg	5 – tied	5 – James	Alex G. Spanos Center (506); Stockton, CA
December 1, 2023*; 6:00 p.m., P12N		at Arizona State; Briann January Classic	L 66–76	4–3	24 – Elliott	11 – Elliott	3 – Elliott	Desert Financial Arena (1,808); Tempe, AZ
December 2, 2023*; 12:00 p.m.		vs. Temple; Briann January Classic	W 79–78	5–3	21 – Smith	15 – Elliott	4 – tied	Desert Financial Arena; Tempe, AZ
December 6, 2023*; 11:00 a.m., ESPN+		at Northern Arizona	L 65–96	5–4	16 – James	8 – James	8 – James	Rolle Activity Center (913); Flagstaff, AZ
December 8, 2023*; 6:00 p.m., ESPN+		UC Santa Barbara	W 72–61	6–4	24 – Smith	7 – Elliott	4 – Ennis	Alex G. Spanos Center (524); Stockton, CA
December 16, 2023*; 5:00 p.m., ESPN+		at Long Beach State; Beach Classic	W 90–86	7–4	25 – Elliott	7 – tied	5 – James	Walter Pyramid; Long Beach, CA
December 20, 2023*; 11:00 a.m., ESPN+		Cal Maritime	W 108–45	8–4	21 – Glazier	11 – Glazier	8 – James	Alex G. Spanos Center (2,740); Stockton, CA
December 31, 2023*; 2:00 p.m., ESPN+		Columbia	L 75–93	8–5	15 – Elliott	7 – Holmberg	9 – James	Alex G. Spanos Center (380); Stockton, CA
WCC regular season
January 4, 2024; 6:30 p.m., ESPN+		at Saint Mary's	W 60–57	9–5 (1–0)	23 – Elliott	7 – Elliott	6 – James	University Credit Union Pavilion (338); Moraga, CA
January 6, 2024; 2:00 p.m., ESPN+		at Santa Clara	L 77–80	9–6 (1–1)	23 – James	9 – James	8 – James	Leavey Center (388); Santa Clara, CA
January 11, 2024; 6:00 p.m., ESPN+		Loyola Marymount	W 75–54	10–6 (2–1)	20 – Deaton	7 – James	8 – Deaton	Alex G. Spanos Center (418); Stockton, CA
January 13, 2024; 2:00 p.m., ESPN+		San Francisco	L 68–81	10–7 (2–2)	18 – James	10 – Ward	6 – James	Alex G. Spanos Center (471); Stockton, CA
January 18, 2024; 6:00 p.m., ESPN+		at San Diego	W 75–48	11–7 (3–2)	20 – Holmberg	8 – Elliott	7 – James	Jenny Craig Pavilion (247); San Diego, CA
January 20, 2024; 6:00 p.m., ESPN+		Pepperdine	W 72–49	12–7 (4–2)	21 – Holmberg	9 – Schweizer	5 – James	Alex G. Spanos Center (777); Stockton, CA
January 25, 2024; 6:00 p.m., ESPN+		Saint Mary's	W 60–45	13–7 (5–2)	19 – Elliott	5 – tied	9 – James	Alex G. Spanos Center (606); Stockton, CA
February 1, 2024; 6:00 p.m., ESPN+		at Portland	L 72–85	13–8 (5–3)	22 – Elliott	7 – tied	3 – Smith	Chiles Center (372); Portland, OR
February 3, 2024; 2:00 p.m., ESPN+		at No. 19 Gonzaga	L 39–104	13–9 (5–4)	10 – Glazier	7 – Elliott	2 – Smith	McCarthey Athletic Center (5,633); Spokane, WA
February 10, 2024; 2:00 p.m., ESPN+		at San Francisco	L 72–79	13–10 (5–5)	21 – James	8 – Holmberg	6 – James	War Memorial Gymnasium (325); San Francisco, CA
February 15, 2024; 6:00 p.m., ESPN+		Portland	W 80–74	14–10 (6–5)	25 – Holmberg	7 – Holmberg	7 – James	Alex G. Spanos Center; Stockton, CA
February 17, 2024; 2:00 p.m., ESPN+		No. 17 Gonzaga	L 78–91	14–11 (6–6)	14 – Elliott	6 – Glazier	9 – James	Alex G. Spanos Center (1,183); Stockton, CA
February 22, 2024; 6:00 p.m., ESPN+		at Pepperdine	W 70–54	15–11 (7–6)	15 – Deaton	8 – Smith	5 – James	Firestone Fieldhouse (102); Malibu, CA
February 24, 2024; 2:00 p.m., ESPN+		at Loyola Marymount	L 71–80	15–12 (7–7)	24 – Elliott	9 – Elliott	6 – James	Gersten Pavilion (375); Los Angeles, CA
February 29, 2024; 6:00 p.m., ESPN+		San Diego	W 82–62	16–12 (8–7)	18 – Deaton	10 – Elliott	10 – James	Alex G. Spanos Center (1,040); Stockton, CA
March 2, 2024; 2:00 p.m., ESPN+		Santa Clara	L 77–85	16–13 (8–8)	16 – tied	7 – Ennis	10 – James	Alex G. Spanos Center (917); Stockton, CA
WCC women's tournament
March 8, 2024; 12:00 p.m., ESPN+	(5)	vs. (8) San Diego; Second round	W 72–66	17–13	19 – Holmberg	7 – Holmberg	6 – Smith	Orleans Arena (853); Paradise, NV
March 9, 2024; 1:00 p.m., ESPN+	(5)	vs. (4) San Francisco; Quarterfinals	W 76–71	18–13	18 – Deaton	8 – Deaton	10 – James	Orleans Arena (1,387); Paradise, NV
March 11, 2024; 12:00 p.m., ESPN+	(5)	vs. (1) No. 14 Gonzaga; Semifinals	L 61–72	18–14	23 – James	4 – tied	5 – James	Orleans Arena; Paradise, NV
National Invitational Tournament
March 21, 2024*; 6:00 p.m., ESPN+		Cal Poly; First round	W 63–43	19–14	16 – Elliott	9 – Deaton	5 – James	Alex G. Spanos Center (749); Stockton, CA
March 26, 2024*; 5:00 p.m., Big Ten+		at Minnesota; Second round	L 62–77	19–15	14 – Holmberg	7 – Elliott	7 – James	Williams Arena (1,140); Minneapolis, MN
*Non-conference game. ^{#}Rankings from AP poll. (#) Tournament seedings in parentheses. All times are in Pacific.

== See also ==
- 2023–24 Pacific Tigers men's basketball team
