= 2023–24 Saint Mary's Gaels women's basketball team =

American college basketball season

2023–24 Saint Mary's Gaels women's basketball
- Conference: West Coast Conference
- Record: 13–18 (6–10 WCC)
- Head coach: Jeff Cammon (1st season)
- Assistant coaches: Paul Reed; Kevin Adams; Lexi Petersen
- Home arena: University Credit Union Pavilion

2023–24 West Coast Conference women's basketball standings
	Conf.				Overall
Team	W		L	PCT	W		L	PCT
No. 14 Gonzaga	16	–	0	1.000	32	–	4	.889
Santa Clara	12	–	4	.750	25	–	9	.735
Portland †	10	–	6	.625	21	–	13	.618
San Francisco	10	–	6	.625	14	–	16	.467
Pacific	8	–	8	.500	18	–	15	.545
Saint Mary's	6	–	10	.375	13	–	18	.419
Loyola Marymount	5	–	11	.313	11	–	19	.367
San Diego	4	–	12	.250	9	–	22	.290
Pepperdine	1	–	15	.063	5	–	25	.167
† 2024 WCC tournament winner Rankings from AP poll

The 2023–24 Saint Mary's Gaels women's basketball team represented the Saint Mary's College of California in the 2023–24 NCAA Division I women's basketball season. They were led by first year coach Jeff Cammon. They played their homes games at University Credit Union Pavilion and were members of the West Coast Conference.

== Previous season ==
The Gaels finished the 2022–23 season 13–18, 6–12 in WCC play to finish in a tie for seventh place. As the No. 7 seed in the WCC tournament, they defeated Loyola Marymount in the first round before losing in the second round to Pacific.

== Offseason ==
=== Departures ===
Saint Mary's departures
Name	Num	Pos.	Height	Year	Hometown	Reason for departure
Clair Steele	0	G	5'5"	GS senior	Orinda, CA	Graduated
Taycee Wedin	4	G	5'9"	GS senior	Milwaukie, OR	Graduated
Jade Kirisome	11	G	5'9"	(redshirt) Senior	Brisbane, Australia	Graduated/signed to play professionally in Australia with UC Capitals
Daisia Mitchell	24	F	6'0"	Freshman	Rancho Cucamonga, CA	Transferred to Mt. San Antonio College
Aspen Garrison	25	F	6'2"	Sophomore	Bellingham, WA	Transferred to Western Washington
Amy West	30	F	6'4"	(redshirt) Senior	Palmerston North, New Zealand	Graduated/signed to play professionally in England with Oaklands Wolves

==== Recruiting ====
There was no recruiting class of 2023.

== Roster ==
2023–24 Saint Mary's Gaels women's basketball team
Players
Coaches

Pos.	#	Name	Height	Year	Previous school	Hometown
G	1	Makena Mastora	5 ft 9 in (1.75 m)	Jr	St. Joseph Notre Dame	Alameda, CA
G	3	Leia Hanafin	5 ft 11 in (1.8 m)	Sr	Box Hill Secondary Academy	Melbourne, Australia
G	8	Emily Foy	6 ft 1 in (1.85 m)	Fr	St. Francis Xavier's College	Newcastle, Australia
G	9	Maia Jones	5 ft 10 in (1.78 m)	RS Fr	Waimea College	Richmond, New Zealand
G	10	Tayla Dalton	5 ft 9 in (1.75 m)	Sr	Carmel College	Auckland, New Zealand
G	11	Jasmine Farmer	5 ft 9 in (1.75 m)	Jr	Saint Mary's College; Laney College	Hercules, CA
F	12	Ruby Vlahov	6 ft 3 in (1.91 m)	Fr	Marist	Perth, Australia
G	21	Hannah Rapp	5 ft 10 in (1.78 m)	Jr	Avila College	Melbourne, Australia
F	22	Ellie Croco	6 ft 1 in (1.85 m)	Sr	Lebanon	Lebanon, OR
G	23	Addison Wedin	5 ft 10 in (1.78 m)	RS So	La Salle	Milwaukie, OR
G	24	Zeryhia Aokuso	5 ft 10 in (1.78 m)	Fr	Amarillo	Amarillo, TX
F	31	Nadia Bernard	6 ft 4 in (1.93 m)	Fr	West Ranch	Santa Clarita, CA
F	33	Ali Bamberger	6 ft 3 in (1.91 m)	RS Sr	Carondelet; Washington	Walnut Creek, CA

Head coach

- Jeff Cammon (Alcorn State)

Assistant coach(es)

- Paul Reed (Langston)
- Kevin Adams (Cal Baptist)
- Lexi Petersen (Oregon)

Legend

- (C) Team captain
- (S) Suspended
- (I) Ineligible
- (W) Walk-on
- Injured
- Current redshirt

Roster

== Schedule and results ==
Date time, TV	Rank^{#}	Opponent^{#}	Result	Record	High points	High rebounds	High assists	Site (attendance) city, state
Exhibition
October 30, 2023*; 6:00 p.m.		Chico State	W 79–65		22 – Jones	7 – Hanafin	6 – Dalton	University Credit Union Pavilion; Moraga, CA
Non-conference regular season
November 6, 2023*; 3:00 p.m., ESPN+		at Grand Canyon	L 52–55	0–1	17 – Aokuso	8 – Bamberger	3 – Bamberger	Global Credit Union Arena (1,557); Phoenix, AZ
November 12, 2023*; 1:00 p.m., ESPN+		UC San Diego	W 61–58 ^{OT}	1–1	16 – Bamberger	8 – Tied	2 – Tied	University Credit Union Pavilion (403); Moraga, CA
November 14, 2023*; 6:30 p.m., ESPN+		UC Irvine	W 52–37	2–1	15 – Wedin	6 – Wedin	5 – Aokuso	University Credit Union Pavilion (311); Moraga, CA
November 19, 2023*; 12:00 p.m., ESPN+		at Rice	L 62–73	2–2	12 – Tied	7 – Bamberger	4 – Dalton	Tudor Fieldhouse (541); Houston, TX
November 21, 2023*; 6:30 p.m., ESPN+		St. Thomas (MN)	L 60–74	2–3	16 – Aokuso	5 – Hanafin	4 – Rapp	University Credit Union Pavilion (308); Moraga, CA
November 24, 2023*; 6:00 p.m., ESPN+		North Carolina A&T; Saint Mary's Thanksgiving Classic	W 73–65	3–3	22 – Bamberger	4 – Tied	6 – Hanafin	University Credit Union Pavilion (264); Moraga, CA
November 25, 2023*; 3:00 p.m., ESPN+		Illinois State; Saint Mary's Thanksgiving Classic	L 51–62	3–4	11 – Dalton	4 – Tied	5 – Bamberger	University Credit Union Pavilion (352); Moraga, CA
December 2, 2023*; 12:00 p.m., P12N		at California	L 69–74	3–5	19 – Dalton	5 – Tied	6 – Dalton	Haas Pavilion (964); Berkeley, CA
December 8, 2023*; 6:30 p.m., ESPN+		Montana State	W 59–53	4–5	15 – Foy	9 – Bamberger	5 – Bamberger	University Credit Union Pavilion (271); Moraga, CA
December 10, 2023*; 2:00 p.m., ESPN+		at UC Davis	L 66–87	4–6	16 – Bamberger	7 – Foy	5 – Aokuso	University Credit Union Center (663); Davis, CA
December 16, 2023*; 1:00 p.m., P12N		at Washington	L 32–64	4–7	11 – Aokuso	6 – Aokuso	2 – Bamberger	Alaska Airlines Arena (2,490); Seattle, WA
December 18, 2023*; 6:30 p.m., ESPN+		Cal State East Bay	W 83–67	5–7	26 – Mastora	5 – Vlahov	5 – Tied	University Credit Union Pavilion (212); Moraga, CA
December 21, 2023*; 5:00 p.m., SLN		at Denver	W 61–56	6–7	12 – Tied	6 – Tied	4 – Bamberger	Hamilton Gymnasium (230); Denver, CO
December 29, 2023*; 1:00 p.m., ESPN+		San Jose State	W 70–52	7–7	14 – Wedin	5 – Tied	7 – Aokuso	University Credit Union Pavilion (229); Moraga, CA
WCC regular season
January 4, 2024; 6:30 p.m., ESPN+		Pacific	L 57–60	7–8 (0–1)	13 – Dalton	5 – Bamberger	6 – Dalton	University Credit Union Pavilion (338); Moraga, CA
January 6, 2024; 5:00 p.m., ESPN+		San Diego	W 67–59	8–8 (1–1)	19 – Aokuso	6 – Rapp	3 – Tied	University Credit Union Pavilion (457); Moraga, CA
January 13, 2024; 5:00 p.m., ESPN+		Loyola Marymount	L 48–66	8–9 (1–2)	11 – Bamberger	4 – Tied	2 – Bamberger	University Credit Union Pavilion (443); Moraga, CA
January 20, 2024; 2:00 p.m., ESPN+		at No. 17 Gonzaga	L 60–89	8–10 (1–3)	17 – Dalton	5 – Hanafin	4 – Aokuso	McCarthey Athletic Center (5,439); Spokane, WA
January 22, 2024; 12:00 p.m., ESPN+		at Portland; Rescheduled from January 18	W 73–67 ^{OT}	9–10 (2–3)	24 – Aokoso	8 – Hanafin	5 – Dalton	Chiles Center (244); Portland, OR
January 25, 2024; 6:00 p.m., ESPN+		at Pacific	L 45–60	9–11 (2–4)	12 – Aokuso	6 – Vlahov	2 – Tied	Alex G. Spanos Center (606); Stockton, CA
January 27, 2024; 2:00 p.m., ESPN+		Santa Clara	W 74–67	10–11 (3–4)	22 – Jones	7 – Aokuso	4 – Tied	University Credit Union Pavilion (766); Moraga, CA
February 3, 2024; 5:00 p.m., ESPN+		Portland	L 35–68	10–12 (3–5)	11 – Bamberger	9 – Bamberger	3 – Rapp	University Credit Union Pavilion (361); Moraga, CA
February 8, 2024; 6:00 p.m., ESPN+		at San Francisco	L 54–59	10–13 (3–6)	17 – Aokuso	6 – Tied	4 – Aokuso	War Memorial Gymnasium (226); San Francisco, CA
February 10, 2024; 2:00 p.m., ESPN+		at Santa Clara	L 58–70	10–14 (3–7)	15 – Bamberger	4 – Tied	4 – Tied	Leavey Center (319); Santa Clara, CA
February 15, 2024; 4:30 p.m., ESPN+		No. 17 Gonzaga	L 68–96	10–15 (3–8)	16 – Aokuso	4 – Tied	5 – Dalton	University Credit Union Pavilion (441); Moraga, CA
February 17, 2024; 5:00 p.m., ESPN+		Pepperdine	W 75–47	11–15 (4–8)	31 – Jones	5 – Rapp	7 – Aokuso	University Credit Union Pavilion (472); Moraga, CA
February 22, 2024; 7:00 p.m., ESPN+		at Loyola Marymount	W 70–66	12–15 (4–9)	27 – Dalton	7 – Bamberger	6 – Bamberger	Gersten Pavilion (326); Los Angeles, CA
February 24, 2024; 2:00 p.m., ESPN+		at San Diego	L 52–69	12–16 (5–9)	19 – Aokuso	7 – Aokuso	4 – Bamberger	Jenny Craig Pavilion (1,494); San Diego, CA
February 29, 2024; 6:30 p.m., ESPN+		San Francisco	L 74–78 ^{OT}	12–17 (5–10)	28 – Aokuso	5 – Tied	4 – Hanafin	University Credit Union Pavilion (401); Moraga, CA
March 2, 2024; 2:00 p.m., ESPN+		at Pepperdine	W 69–48	13–17 (6–10)	15 – Tied	6 – Rapp	4 – Tied	Firestone Fieldhouse (213); Malibu, CA
WCC women's tournament
March 8, 2024; 2:30 p.m., ESPN+	(6)	vs. (7) Loyola Marymount; Second Round	L 62–78	13–18	21 – Jones	7 – Aokuso	5 – Tied	Orleans Arena (971); Paradise, NV
*Non-conference game. ^{#}Rankings from AP Poll. (#) Tournament seedings in parentheses. All times are in Pacific Time.

== See also ==
- 2023–24 Saint Mary's Gaels men's basketball team
