= 2023–24 San Diego Toreros women's basketball team =

American college basketball season

2023–24 San Diego Toreros women's basketball
- Conference: West Coast Conference
- Record: 9–22 (4–12 WCC)
- Head coach: Cindy Fisher (19th season)
- Associate head coach: Mary Ann Falcosky
- Assistant coaches: Jualeah Woods; Rachel Nagel
- Home arena: Jenny Craig Pavilion

2023–24 West Coast Conference women's basketball standings
	Conf.				Overall
Team	W		L	PCT	W		L	PCT
No. 14 Gonzaga	16	–	0	1.000	32	–	4	.889
Santa Clara	12	–	4	.750	25	–	9	.735
Portland †	10	–	6	.625	21	–	13	.618
San Francisco	10	–	6	.625	14	–	16	.467
Pacific	8	–	8	.500	18	–	15	.545
Saint Mary's	6	–	10	.375	13	–	18	.419
Loyola Marymount	5	–	11	.313	11	–	19	.367
San Diego	4	–	12	.250	9	–	22	.290
Pepperdine	1	–	15	.063	5	–	25	.167
† 2024 WCC tournament winner Rankings from AP poll

The 2023–24 San Diego Toreros women's basketball team represented the University of San Diego in the 2023–24 NCAA Division I women's basketball season. The Toreros, led by 19th-year head coach Cindy Fisher, played their home games at the Jenny Craig Pavilion and are members of the West Coast Conference (WCC).

== Previous season ==
The Toreros finished the 2022–23 season 19–14, 11–7 in WCC play, to finish in third place. As the No. 3 seed in the WCC tournament, they lost in the quarterfinals to Pacific. They were invited to the WNIT where they defeated Long Beach State in round 1 and UC Irvine in round 2, before losing to Oregon in the super 16 to end their season.

== Offseason ==
=== Departures ===
San Diego departures
Name	Num	Pos.	Height	Year	Hometown	Reason for departure
Kiera Oakry	0	G	5' 10"	(redshirt) Senior	San Diego, CA	Graduated
Ayanna Khalfani	5	G	5' 11"	Senior	Woodland Hills, CA	Graduate transferred to UNC Greensboro
Myah Pace	10	G	5' 11"	GS Senior	Oakland, CA	Graduated/signed to play professionally in England with Manchester Mystics
Laura Erikstrup	11	F	6' 2"	Junior	Portland, OR	Transferred to Grand Canyon
Amanda Olinger	33	F	6' 3"	Senior	Chatsworth, CA	Graduate transferred to Cal Poly

=== Incoming ===
San Diego incoming transfers
Name	Num	Pos.	Height	Year	Hometown	Previous school
Dylan Horton	10	G	5' 9"	Senior	Los Angeles, CA	Florida A&M
Maddie Vejsicky	14	G	6' 0"	Sophomore	New Concord, OH	Virginia Tech

==== Recruiting ====
There was no recruiting class of 2023.

== Roster ==
2023–24 San Diego Toreros women's basketball team
Players
Coaches

Pos.	#	Name	Height	Year	Previous school	Hometown
F	1	Courtney Wristen	6 ft 2 in (1.88 m)	Jr	Broomfield	Broomfield, CO
G	2	Veronica Sheffey	5 ft 9 in (1.75 m)	So	Sno-King Academy	Woodinville, WA
G	3	Jess Finney	6 ft 0 in (1.83 m)	Jr	Chaparral; Washington	Scottsdale, AZ
G	4	Mila Wawszkowicz	5 ft 11 in (1.8 m)	Fr	Hunter Valley Grammar School	Maitland (NSW), Australia
G	5	Lauren McCall	5 ft 6 in (1.68 m)	Fr	Timberline	Boise, ID
G	10	Dylan Horton	5 ft 9 in (1.75 m)	GS	Redondo Union; Florida A&M	Inglewood, CA
G	11	Malia Tharpe	6 ft 0 in (1.83 m)	Fr	Shenton College	Cottesloe, Australia
G	14	Maddie Vejsicky	6 ft 0 in (1.83 m)	So	Newark; Virginia Tech	New Concord, OH
F	21	Melesungu Afeaki	6 ft 2 in (1.88 m)	So	Capuchino	San Bruno, CA
F	22	Kasey Neubert	6 ft 1 in (1.85 m)	RS Sr	Highlands Ranch; Hawaii	Elizabeth, CO
F	23	Harsimran Kaur	6 ft 4 in (1.93 m)	Jr	Central Pointe Academy (FL)	Kapurthala, India
G	24	Kylie Horstmeyer	6 ft 0 in (1.83 m)	Jr	Redwood	Greenbrae, CA
G	30	Claire Gallagher	5 ft 11 in (1.8 m)	RS Jr	King's; Lafayette	Lake Forest Park, WA

Head coach

- Cindy Fisher (Eastern Wyoming College)

Assistant coach(es)

- Mary Ann Falcosky (Northern Arizona)
- Jualeah Woods (USC)
- Rachel Nagel (UC Davis)

Legend

- (C) Team captain
- (S) Suspended
- (I) Ineligible
- (W) Walk-on
- Injured
- Current redshirt

Roster
Last update: September 30, 2024

== Schedule and results ==
Date time, TV	Rank^{#}	Opponent^{#}	Result	Record	High points	High rebounds	High assists	Site (attendance) city, state
Non-conference regular season
November 6, 2023*; 5:30 p.m., ESPN+		Chapman	W 92–38	1–0	14 – Horstmeyer	11 – Neubert	6 – Sheffey	Jenny Craig Pavilion (202); San Diego, CA
November 11, 2023*; 2:00 p.m., ESPN+		Portland State	W 71–43	2–0	18 – Horstmeyer	12 – Neubert	5 – Sheffey	Jenny Craig Pavilion (327); San Diego, CA
November 14, 2023*; 5:30 p.m.		at Arizona	L 66–79	2–1	15 – Sheffey	10 – Neubert	2 – Sheffey	McKale Center (6,727); Tucson, AZ
November 19, 2023*; 2:00 p.m., ESPN+		Princeton	L 51–62	2–2	12 – Neubert	6 – Horton	6 – Sheffey	Jenny Craig Pavilion (1,059); San Diego, CA
November 24, 2023*; 2:00 p.m., ESPN+		Weber State; The Dana on Mission Bay Thanksgiving Tournament	W 56–53	3–2	17 – Sheffey	10 – Kaur	4 – Finney	Jenny Craig Pavilion (555); San Diego, CA
November 25, 2023*; 4:00 p.m., ESPN+		UNLV; The Dana on Mission Bay Thanksgiving Tournament	L 56–93	3–3	10 – tied	4 – tied	5 – Sheffey	Jenny Craig Pavilion (223); San Diego, CA
November 29, 2023*; 1:00 p.m., MW Network		at Nevada	L 63–76	3–4	18 – Sheffey	8 – Wristen	4 – Sheffey	Lawlor Events Center (1,003); Reno, NV
December 3, 2023*; 3:00 p.m.		at No. 6 USC	L 58–89	3–5	18 – Horstmeyer	10 – Wristen	7 – Sheffey	Galen Center (2,169); Los Angeles, CA
December 7, 2023*; 6:00 p.m., ESPN+		San Diego State	L 63–67	3–6	23 – Sheffey	9 – Neubert	8 – Sheffey	Jenny Craig Pavilion (637); San Diego, CA
December 10, 2023*; 2:00 p.m., ESPN+		at Cal State Northridge	W 85–61	4–6	14 – Finney	9 – Wristen	8 – Sheffey	Premier America Credit Union Arena (244); Northridge, CA
December 20, 2023*; 2:00 p.m., ESPN+		Montana; USD Winter Classic	L 52–72	4–7	12 – Sheffey	7 – Neubert	4 – Sheffey	Jenny Craig Pavilion (232); San Diego, CA
December 21, 2023*; 4:00 p.m., ESPN+		Boise State; USD Winter Classic	L 54–62	4–8	15 – Sheffey	13 – Neubert	5 – Sheffey	Jenny Craig Pavilion (203); San Diego, CA
December 30, 2023*; 2:00 p.m., ESPN+		Brown	L 61–70	4–9	17 – Finney	10 – Neubert	6 – Sheffey	Jenny Craig Pavilion (413); San Diego, CA
WCC regular season
January 4, 2024; 4:30 p.m., ESPN+		Pepperdine	L 52–53	4–10 (0–1)	13 – Horstmeyer	14 – Neubert	3 – tied	Jenny Craig Pavilion (235); San Diego, CA
January 6, 2024; 5:00 p.m., ESPN+		at Saint Mary's	L 59–67	4–11 (0–2)	18 – Neubert	11 – Neubert	6 – Sheffey	University Credit Union Pavilion (457); Moraga, CA
January 11, 2024; 6:00 p.m., ESPN+		at Portland	L 54–65	4–12 (0–3)	15 – tied	12 – tied	5 – Sheffey	Chiles Center (436); Portland, OR
January 13, 2024; 2:00 p.m., ESPN+		at No. 16 Gonzaga	L 67–85	4–13 (0–4)	20 – Sheffey	7 – Neubert	2 – tied	McCarthey Athletic Center (5,303); Spokane, WA
January 18, 2024; 6:00 p.m., ESPN+		Pacific	L 48–75	4–14 (0–5)	18 – Sheffey	16 – Neubert	2 – Gallagher	Jenny Craig Pavilion (247); San Diego, CA
January 20, 2024; 2:00 p.m., ESPN+		at Loyola Marymount	L 60–67	4–15 (0–6)	16 – Neubert	10 – Neubert	5 – Sheffey	Gersten Pavilion (289); Los Angeles, CA
January 27, 2024; 2:00 p.m., ESPN+		Portland	L 59–64	4–16 (0–7)	12 – Kaur	8 – Neubert	6 – Sheffey	Jenny Craig Pavilion (388); San Diego, CA
February 1, 2024; 6:00 p.m., ESPN+		No. 19 Gonzaga	L 52–80	4–17 (0–8)	13 – Horton	9 – Neubert	8 – Sheffey	Jenny Craig Pavilion (334); San Diego, CA
February 3, 2024; 2:00 p.m., ESPN+		San Francisco	W 77–66	5–17 (1–8)	22 – Horton	8 – Wawszkowicz	6 – tied	Jenny Craig Pavilion (314); San Diego, CA
February 8, 2024; 6:00 p.m., ESPN+		at Santa Clara	L 57–83	5–18 (1–9)	18 – Kaur	6 – Neubert	7 – Sheffey	Leavey Center (418); Santa Clara, CA
February 15, 2024; 6:00 p.m., ESPN+		at Pepperdine	W 69–49	6–18 (2–9)	15 – Horstmeyer	11 – Neubert	5 – Sheffey	Firestone Fieldhouse (103); Malibu, CA
February 17, 2024; 2:00 p.m., ESPN+		Loyola Marymount	W 66–50	7–18 (3–9)	18 – Horton	9 – Neubert	6 – Sheffey	Jenny Craig Pavilion (631); San Diego, CA
February 22, 2024; 6:00 p.m., ESPN+		Santa Clara	L 57–66	7–19 (3–10)	12 – Horstmeyer	11 – Neubert	5 – Sheffey	Jenny Craig Pavilion (384); San Diego, CA
February 24, 2024; 2:00 p.m., ESPN+		Saint Mary's	W 69–52	8–19 (4–10)	19 – Sheffey	13 – Neubert	7 – Sheffey	Jenny Craig Pavilion (1,494); San Diego, CA
February 29, 2024; 6:00 p.m., ESPN+		at Pacific	L 62–82	8–20 (4–11)	15 – Finney	10 – Neubert	5 – Sheffey	Alex G. Spanos Center (1,040); Stockton, CA
March 2, 2024; 2:00 p.m., ESPN+		at San Francisco	L 66–68	8–21 (4–12)	23 – Finney	5 – Neubert	4 – Finney	War Memorial Gymnasium (578); San Francisco, CA
WCC women's tournament
March 7, 2024; 12:00 p.m., ESPN+	(8)	vs. (9) Pepperdine; First round	W 79–64	9–21	21 – Kaur	8 – tied	7 – Sheffey	Orleans Arena (513); Paradise, NV
March 8, 2024; 12:00 p.m., ESPN+	(8)	vs. (5) Pacific; Second round	L 66–72	9–22	18 – Horstmeyer	14 – Kaur	8 – Finney	Orleans Arena (853); Paradise, NV
*Non-conference game. ^{#}Rankings from AP poll. (#) Tournament seedings in parentheses. All times are in Pacific.

== See also ==
- 2023–24 San Diego Toreros men's basketball team
