= 2023–24 Gonzaga Bulldogs women's basketball team =

American college basketball season

2023–24 Gonzaga Bulldogs women's basketball

WCC regular season champions

NCAA tournament, Sweet Sixteen
- Conference: West Coast Conference

Ranking
- Coaches: No. 13
- AP: No. 14
- Record: 32–4 (16–0 WCC)
- Head coach: Lisa Fortier (10th season)
- Assistant coaches: Jordan Green; Stacy Clinesmith; Craig Fortier
- Home arena: McCarthey Athletic Center

2023–24 West Coast Conference women's basketball standings
	Conf.				Overall
Team	W		L	PCT	W		L	PCT
No. 14 Gonzaga	16	–	0	1.000	32	–	4	.889
Santa Clara	12	–	4	.750	25	–	9	.735
Portland †	10	–	6	.625	21	–	13	.618
San Francisco	10	–	6	.625	14	–	16	.467
Pacific	8	–	8	.500	18	–	15	.545
Saint Mary's	6	–	10	.375	13	–	18	.419
Loyola Marymount	5	–	11	.313	11	–	19	.367
San Diego	4	–	12	.250	9	–	22	.290
Pepperdine	1	–	15	.063	5	–	25	.167
† 2024 WCC tournament winner Rankings from AP poll

The 2023–24 Gonzaga Bulldogs women's basketball team represented Gonzaga University in the 2023–24 NCAA Division I women's basketball season. The Bulldogs (also informally referred to as the "Zags"), were members of the West Coast Conference. The Bulldogs, led by tenth year head coach Lisa Fortier, played their home games at the McCarthey Athletic Center on the university campus in Spokane, Washington.

== Previous season ==
The Bulldogs finished the season at 28–5 and 17–1 in WCC play to win the WCC regular season championship. They advanced to the WCC women's tournament championship game where they lost to Portland. They received an at-large bid to the NCAA Women's Tournament as a 9th seed in Seattle region 4 where they lost in the first round to Ole Miss.

== Offseason ==
=== Departures ===
Due to COVID-19 disruptions throughout NCAA sports in 2020–21, the NCAA announced that the 2020–21 season would not count against the athletic eligibility of any individual involved in an NCAA winter sport, including women's basketball. This meant that all seniors in 2020–21 had the option to return for 2021–22.

Name	Number	Pos.	Height	Year	Hometown	Reason left
Giana Riley	2	G	5'8"	Freshman	Manteca, CA	Resume back to Gonzaga Bulldogs WSOC
McKayla Williams	24	G	6'1"	Junior	Los Angeles, CA	Transferred to California

==== Recruiting ====
There was no recruiting class of 2023.

== Roster ==
2023–24 Gonzaga Bulldogs women's basketball team
Players
Coaches

Pos.	#	Name	Height	Year	Previous school	Hometown
F	0	Esther Little	6 ft 2 in (1.88 m)	RS Jr	Ipswich Basketball Academy	Ipswich, England
F	1	Destiny Burton	6 ft 0 in (1.83 m)	Sr	Mansfield Timberview; Panola College	Wichita, KS
F	3	Payton Muma	5 ft 8 in (1.73 m)	RS So	Highlands Ranch	Highlands Ranch, CO
G	4	Claire O'Connor	6 ft 0 in (1.83 m)	Fr	Lakeside	Bellevue, WA
G	5	Maud Huijbens	6 ft 3 in (1.91 m)	Jr	N/A; Syracuse	Hilversum, Netherlands
F	10	Calli Stokes	5 ft 11 in (1.8 m)	RS So	Redondo	Redondo Beach, CA
G	11	Kayleigh Truong	5 ft 9 in (1.75 m)	GS	Jersey Village	Houston, TX
F	12	Eliza Hollingsworth	6 ft 2 in (1.88 m)	RS Sr	St Leonard's College	Melbourne, Australia
F	13	Naya Ojukwu	6 ft 0 in (1.83 m)	RS Fr	Mountain View	Meridian, ID
G	14	Kaylynne Truong	5 ft 8 in (1.73 m)	GS	Jersey Village	Houston, TX
F	15	Yvonne Ejim	6 ft 1 in (1.85 m)	Sr	Edge School	Calgary, AB
G	22	Brynna Maxwell	6 ft 0 in (1.83 m)	GS	Gig Harbor; Utah	Gig Harbor, WA
F	31	Ella Hopkins	6 ft 3 in (1.91 m)	Fr	Lourdes	Rochester, MN
G	35	Bree Salenbien	6 ft 2 in (1.88 m)	RS So	Lenawee Christian	Adrian, MI

Head coach

- Lisa Fortier (Cal State Monterey Bay)

Assistant coach(es)

- Jordan Green (George Fox)
- Stacy Clinesmith (UC Santa Barbara)
- Craig Fortier (Cal State Monterey Bay)

Legend

- (C) Team captain
- (S) Suspended
- (I) Ineligible
- (W) Walk-on
- Injured
- Current redshirt

Roster

== Schedule and results ==
Date time, TV	Rank^{#}	Opponent^{#}	Result	Record	High points	High rebounds	High assists	Site (attendance) city, state
Exhibition
November 2, 2023*; 6:00 p.m.		Warner Pacific	W 95–32		–	–	–	McCarthey Athletic Center; Spokane, WA
Non-conference regular season
November 6, 2023*; 6:00 p.m., SWX/ESPN+		at Montana	W 83–70	1–0	19 – Kayly. Truong	9 – Hollingsworth	6 – Kayly. Truong	Dahlberg Arena (2,603); Missoula, MT
November 9, 2023*; 7:00 p.m.		at No. 24 Washington State	L 72–77 ^{OT}	1–1	22 – Kayly. Truong	7 – Hollingsworth	6 – Kayly. Truong	Beasley Coliseum (1,587); Pullman, WA
November 12, 2023*; 2:00 p.m., SWX/ESPN+		Toledo	W 91–70	2–1	22 – Ejim	11 – Hollingsworth	4 – Tied	McCarthey Athletic Center (4,843); Spokane, WA
November 15, 2023*; 6:00 p.m., ESPN+		North Florida	W 83–55	3–1	21 – Kayle. Truong	8 – Ejim	8 – Kayly. Truong	McCarthey Athletic Center (4,845); Spokane, WA
November 18, 2023*; 2:00 p.m., ESPN+		Wyoming	W 80–64	4–1	18 – Kayle. Truong	10 – Ejim	8 – Kayly. Truong	McCarthey Athletic Center (5,059); Spokane, WA
November 24, 2023*; 11:15 a.m., ESPN+		vs. Liberty; Betty Chancellor Classic	W 102–59	5–1	25 – Kayle. Truong	8 – Ejim	8 – Kayly. Truong	Merrell Center (215); Katy, TX
November 25, 2023*; 11:15 a.m., ESPN+		vs. Alabama; Betty Chancellor Classic	W 68–58	6–1	23 – Ejim	8 – Tied	7 – Kayle. Truong	Merrell Center (530); Katy, TX
November 26, 2023*; 10:45 a.m., ESPN+		vs. No. 20 Louisville; Betty Chancellor Classic	L 70–81	6–2	23 – Ejim	7 – Ejim	7 – Kayle. Truong	Merrell Center; Katy, TX
November 29, 2023*; 6:00 p.m., SWX/ESPN+		at Eastern Washington	W 82–80	7–2	23 – Ejim	14 – Hollingsworth	8 – Kayly. Truong	Reese Court (1,378); Cheney, WA
December 3, 2023*; 1:00 p.m., SWX/ESPN+		No. 3 Stanford	W 96–78	8–2	27 – Ejim	12 – Ejim	7 – Kayle. Truong	McCarthey Athletic Center (6,000); Spokane, WA
December 7, 2023*; 7:00 p.m., P12N	No. 23	at California	W 78–70 ^{OT}	9–2	21 – Ejim	9 – Tied	12 – Kayly. Truong	Haas Pavilion (1,109); Berkeley, CA
December 9, 2023*; 12:00 p.m., ESPN+	No. 23	at Rice	W 80–72	10–2	21 – Hollingsworth	10 – Ejim	5 – Kayle. Truong	Tudor Fieldhouse (1,367); Houston, TX
December 17, 2023*; 2:00 p.m., SWX/ESPN+	No. 21	South Dakota State	W 83–58	11–2	17 – Hollingsworth	12 – Hollingsworth	6 – Kayle. Truong	McCarthey Athletic Center (5,120); Spokane, WA
December 20, 2023*; 1:30 p.m., P12N	No. 20	vs. Arizona; Jerry Colangelo Classic	W 81–69	12–2	27 – Ejim	11 – Hollingsworth	6 – Kayly. Truong	Footprint Center; Phoenix, AZ
December 22, 2023*; 1:00 p.m., SWX/ESPN+	No. 20	New Mexico	W 67–56	13–2	22 – Ejim	6 – Huijbens	7 – Kayly. Truong	McCarthey Athletic Center (5,241); Spokane, WA
WCC regular season
January 4, 2024; 6:00 p.m., ESPN+	No. 18	at Portland	W 74–53	14–2 (1–0)	21 – Maxwell	11 – Hollingsworth	4 – Maxwell	Chiles Center (1,503); Portland, OR
January 11, 2024; 6:00 p.m., SWX/ESPN+	No. 16	Santa Clara	W 87–49	15–2 (2–0)	19 – Ejim	7 – Hollingsworth	4 – Tied	McCarthey Athletic Center (5,155); Spokane, WA
January 13, 2024; 2:00 p.m., SWX/ESPN+	No. 16	San Diego	W 85–67	16–2 (3–0)	25 – Ejim	10 – Ejim	7 – Kayle. Truong	McCarthey Athletic Center (5,303); Spokane, WA
January 18, 2024; 7:00 p.m., ESPN+	No. 17	at Loyola Marymount	W 72–48	17–2 (4–0)	24 – Ejim	12 – Ejim	10 – Kayly. Truong	Gersten Pavilion (356); Los Angeles, CA
January 20, 2024; 2:00 p.m., SWX/ESPN+	No. 17	Saint Mary's	W 89–60	18–2 (5–0)	25 – Kayly. Truong	9 – Hollingsworth	6 – Kayly. Truong	McCarthey Athletic Center (5,439); Spokane, WA
January 25, 2024; 4:00 p.m., ESPN+	No. 17	at Santa Clara	W 82–45	19–2 (6–0)	19 – Ejim	13 – Ejim	6 – Kayle. Truong	Leavey Center (337); Santa Clara, CA
January 27, 2024; 2:00 p.m., ESPN+	No. 17	at San Francisco	W 73–54	20–2 (7–0)	21 – Ejim	13 – Ejim	6 – Kayly. Truong	War Memorial Gymnasium; San Francisco, CA
February 1, 2024; 6:00 p.m., ESPN+	No. 19	at San Diego	W 80–52	21–2 (8–0)	19 – Maxwell	8 – Tied	12 – Kayly. Truong	Jenny Craig Pavilion (334); San Diego, CA
February 3, 2024; 2:00 p.m., SWX/ESPN+	No. 19	Pacific	W 104–39	22–2 (9–0)	21 – Ejim	11 – Ejim	9 – Kayly. Truong	McCarthey Athletic Center (5,633); Spokane, WA
February 8, 2024; 6:00 p.m., SWX/ESPN+	No. 19	Pepperdine	W 83–46	23–2 (10–0)	19 – Kayly. Truong	8 – Hollingsworth	3 – Tied	McCarthey Athletic Center (4,921); Spokane, WA
February 10, 2024; 2:00 p.m., ESPN+	No. 19	Loyola Marymount	W 71–47	24–2 (11–0)	13 – Kayly. Truong	7 – Stokes	8 – Kayly. Truong	McCarthey Athletic Center (5,442); Spokane, WA
February 15, 2024; 4:30 p.m., ESPN+	No. 17	at Saint Mary's	W 96–68	25–2 (12–0)	20 – Tied	10 – Ejim	4 – Tied	University Credit Union Pavilion (441); Moraga, CA
February 17, 2024; 2:00 p.m., ESPN+	No. 17	at Pacific	W 91–78	26–2 (13–0)	28 – Ejim	9 – Tied	10 – Kayle. Truong	Alex G. Spanos Center (1,183); Stockton, CA
February 22, 2024; 6:00 p.m., SWX/ESPN+	No. 16	San Francisco	W 74–48	27–2 (14–0)	20 – Ejim	6 – Tied	5 – Tied	McCarthey Athletic Center (5,415); Spokane, WA
February 24, 2024; 2:00 p.m., ESPN+	No. 16	at Pepperdine	W 75–41	28–2 (15–0)	18 – Maxwell	11 – Ejim	6 – Kayly. Truong	Firestone Fieldhouse (103); Malibu, CA
February 28, 2024; 8:00 p.m., ESPNU	No. 16	Portland	W 90–40	29–2 (16–0)	19 – Maxwell	10 – Hollingsworth	6 – Kayly. Truong	McCarthey Athletic Center (6,000); Spokane, WA
WCC women's tournament
March 11, 2024; 12:00 p.m., ESPN+	(1) No. 14	vs. (5) Pacific; Semifinals	W 72–61	30–2	20 – Hollingsworth	13 – Ejim	7 – Kayly. Truong	Orleans Arena; Paradise, NV
March 12, 2024; 1:00 p.m., ESPNU	(1) No. 14	vs. (3) Portland; Championship	L 66–67	30–3	17 – Ejim	11 – Tied	5 – Kayle. Truong	Orleans Arena (2,594); Paradise, NV
NCAA Women's Tournament
March 23, 2024*; 4:30 p.m., ESPN2	(4 P4) No. 16	(13 P4) UC Irvine; First round	W 75–56	31–3	25 – Ejim	14 – Ejim	5 – Tied	McCarthey Athletic Center (6,000); Spokane, WA
March 25, 2024*; 7:30 p.m., ESPN2	(4 P4) No. 16	(5 P4) No. 21 Utah; Second round	W 77–66	32–3	21 – Kayle. Truong	13 – Ejim	5 – Tied	McCarthey Athletic Center (6,000); Spokane, WA
March 29, 2024*; 7:00 p.m., ESPN	(4 P4) No. 16	vs. (1 P4) No. 4 Texas; Sweet Sixteen	L 47–69	32–4	14 – Ejim	5 – Tied	4 – Kayly. Truong	Moda Center (10,104); Portland, OR
*Non-conference game. ^{#}Rankings from AP Poll. (#) Tournament seedings in parentheses. P4=Portland 4. All times are in Pacific Time Zone.

== Rankings ==
Ranking movements Legend: ██ Increase in ranking ██ Decrease in ranking — = Not ranked RV = Received votes
	Week																				
Poll	Pre	1	2	3	4	5	6	7	8	9	10	11	12	13	14	15	16	17	18	19	Final
AP	RV	—	—	RV	23	21	20	20	18	16	17	17	19	19	17	16	16	15	14	16	14
Coaches	RV	RV	RV	RV	23	21	20	20	19	17	17	17	17	16	16	15	13	13	12	13	13

== See also ==
- 2023–24 Gonzaga Bulldogs men's basketball team
