= Wyndham Central College =

Coordinates: 37°53′18″S 144°39′15″E

Location
- 101 Shaws Road; Werribee, Victoria; Australia

Information
- Type: Coeducational state secondary college
- Established: 1970's
- Administrator: Victorian Department of Education
- Principal: Leanne Gagatsis
- Teaching staff: approx 101
- Years: 7–12
- Enrollment: approx 1,333
- Campus: Werribee, Victoria
- Colours: White, aqua, navy blue
- Athletics: Red House; Green House; Yellow House; Blue House
- Affiliations: Victorian Department of Education
- Website: http://www.wyndhamcentralsc.vic.edu.au

Wyndham Central College, formerly the Werribee Technical School and Galvin Park Secondary College (GPSC), is a government-funded high school in the outer Melbourne suburb of Werribee, Victoria, Australia. First being named Werribee Technical School between 1974 and 1983, it was first renamed to Galvin Park Secondary Secondary College, then finally being named Wyndham Central College in 2013.

Wyndham Central College has a student population of about 1300, offering a curriculum for years 7–12. The Victorian Certificate of Education (VCE) alongside the VCE Vocational Major (VM) is offered for students in Year 11 and 12.

== See also ==
- List of schools in Victoria
