= 2023–24 NCAA Division I women's basketball rankings =

- Season: 2023–24
- NCAA Tournament: 2024
- Preseason No. 1: LSU
- NCAA Tournament Champions: South Carolina
NCAA Division I women's basketball rankings


Two human polls make up the 2023–24 NCAA Division I women's basketball rankings, the AP poll and the Coaches Poll, in addition to various publications' preseason polls.

== Legend ==
	Increase in ranking
	Decrease in ranking
	Not ranked previous week
Italics	Number of first-place votes
(#–#)	Win–loss record
т	Tied with team above or below also with this symbol

== AP Poll ==
The AP poll for women's college basketball poll began during the 1976–77 season, and was initially compiled by Mel Greenberg and published by The Philadelphia Inquirer. At first, it was a poll of coaches conducted via telephone, where coaches identified top teams and a list of the top 20 teams was produced. The contributors continued to be coaches until 1994, when the AP took over administration of the poll from Greenberg, and switched to a panel of writers.

	Preseason Oct. 17	Week 2 Nov. 13	Week 3 Nov. 20	Week 4 Nov. 27	Week 5 Dec. 4	Week 6 Dec. 11	Week 7 Dec. 18	Week 8 Dec. 25	Week 9 Jan. 1	Week 10 Jan. 8	Week 11 Jan. 15	Week 12 Jan. 22	Week 13 Jan. 29	Week 14 Feb. 5	Week 15 Feb. 12	Week 16 Feb. 19	Week 17 Feb. 26	Week 18 Mar. 4	Week 19 Mar. 11	Week 20 Mar. 18	Final Apr. 8	
1.	LSU (35)	South Carolina (2–0) (23)	South Carolina (3–0) (36)	South Carolina (5–0) (36)	South Carolina (7–0) (35)	South Carolina (9–0) (36)	South Carolina (10–0) (35)	South Carolina (11–0) (36)	South Carolina (12–0) (34)	South Carolina (14–0) (34)	South Carolina (15–0) (36)	South Carolina (17–0) (35)	South Carolina (19–0) (35)	South Carolina (21–0) (35)	South Carolina (23–0) (35)	South Carolina (25–0) (35)	South Carolina (27–0) (35)	South Carolina (29–0) (35)	South Carolina (32–0) (35)	South Carolina (32–0) (35)	South Carolina (38–0) (35)	1.
2.	UConn (1)	Iowa (3–0) (13)	UCLA (4–0)	UCLA (6–0)	UCLA (7–0)	UCLA (9–0)	UCLA (9–0)	UCLA (11–0)	UCLA (12–0) (1)	UCLA (14–0) (1)	Iowa (17–1)	UCLA (15–1)	Kansas State (20–1)	Iowa (21–2)	Ohio State (21–3)	Ohio State (22–3)	Ohio State (24–3)	Stanford (26–4)	Iowa (29–4)	Iowa (29–4)	Iowa (34–5)	2.
3.	Iowa	UCLA (3–0)	Colorado (4–0)	Stanford (7–0)	NC State (9–0)	NC State (10–0)	NC State (11–0)	NC State (12–0)	NC State (13–0)	Iowa (15–1)	Colorado (15–1)	Colorado (16–2)	Iowa (19–2)	NC State (19–2)	Stanford (22–3)	Stanford (23–3)	Texas (26–3)	Iowa (26–4)	USC (26–5)	USC (26–5)	UConn (33–6)	3.
4.	UCLA	Utah (2–0)	Stanford (4–0)	Iowa (7–1)	Iowa (8–1)	Iowa (10–1)	Iowa (11–1)	Iowa (12–1)	Iowa (13–1)	Baylor (14–0)	NC State (15–1)	Kansas State (18–1)	Stanford (19–2)	Colorado (19–3)	Iowa (22–3)	Iowa (23–3)	Stanford (24–4)	Ohio State (25–4)	Stanford (28–5)	Texas (30–4)	NC State (31–7)	4.
5.	Utah	Colorado (3–0)	Iowa (4–1)	NC State (7–0)	Texas (9–0)	Texas (10–0)	Texas (11–0)	Texas (12–0)	Colorado (11–1)	Colorado (13–1)	UCLA (14–1)	Iowa (18–2)	NC State (18–2)	Ohio State (19–3)	Texas (22–3)	Texas (24–3)	Virginia Tech (23–4)	USC (23–5)	Texas (28–4)	Stanford (28–5)	USC (29–6)	5.
6.	South Carolina	Stanford (2–0)	UConn (3–1)	USC (5–0)	USC (7–0)	USC (8–0)	USC (8–0)	USC (10–0)	Baylor (12–0)	NC State (14–1)	USC (13–1)	Stanford (17–2)	Colorado (17–3)	Stanford (20–3)	NC State (21–3)	NC State (23–3)	Iowa (24–4)	Texas (27–4)	UCLA (25–6)	UCLA (25–6)	LSU (31–6)	6.
7.	Ohio State	LSU (2–1)	LSU (4–1)	LSU (7–1)	LSU (8–1)	LSU (9–1)	LSU (11–1)	LSU (12–1)	LSU (13–1)	LSU (15–1)	Kansas State (17–1)	NC State (16–2)	UCLA (16–3)	Texas (21–3)	Kansas State (21–3)	USC (20–4)	USC (21–5)	UCLA (24–5)	Ohio State (25–5)	Ohio State (25–5)	Texas (33–5)	7.
8.	Virginia Tech	UConn (1–1)	USC (3–0)	Colorado (6–1)	Colorado (8–1)	Colorado (9–1)	Colorado (9–1)	Colorado (10–1)	Stanford (12–1)	Stanford (14–1)	Stanford (15–2)	UConn (16–3)	Ohio State (17–3)	Kansas State (20–3)	Colorado (20–4)	Virginia Tech (22–4)	UCLA (21–5)	LSU (26–4)	LSU (28–5)	LSU (28–5)	Oregon State (27–8)	8.
9.	Indiana	Virginia Tech (1–1)	Virginia Tech (2–1)	Virginia Tech (5–1)	Stanford (8–1)	Stanford (8–1)	Stanford (9–1)	Stanford (10–1)	USC (10–1)	USC (12–1)	UConn (14–3)	LSU (18–2)	LSU (18–3)	UCLA (17–4)	UCLA (19–4)	Oregon State (21–4)	LSU (24–4)	UConn (26–5)	Notre Dame (26–6)	Notre Dame (26–6)	Stanford (30–6)	9.
10.	Notre Dame	USC (2–0)	Utah (4–1)	Texas (7–0)	Baylor (7–0)	Baylor (7–0)	Baylor (9–0)	Baylor (10–0)	Texas (13–1)	Texas (15–1)	LSU (16–2)	Texas (18–2)	Indiana (17–2)	USC (16–4)	USC (17–4)	Kansas State (22–4)	UConn (24–5)	NC State (25–5)	UConn (28–5)	UConn (29–5)	UCLA (27–7)	10.
11.	Tennessee	Texas (2–0)	NC State (4–0)	UConn (4–2)	Utah (7–1)	Utah (8–2)	Utah (9–2)	Kansas State (12–1)	Kansas State (13–1)	Virginia Tech (12–2)	Texas (16–2)	USC (13–3)	UConn (17–4)	UConn (19–4)	Oregon State (20–3)	Colorado (20–5)	Oregon State (22–5)	Virginia Tech (23–6)	NC State (27–6)	NC State (27–6)	Notre Dame (28–7)	11.
12.	Ole Miss	Florida State (2–0)	Texas (4–0)	Utah (5–1)	Ohio State (6–1)	Kansas State (9–1)т	Kansas State (10–1)	Utah (10–2)	UConn (13–1)	Kansas State (15–1)	Baylor (14–2)	Ohio State (15–3)	Texas (18–3)	Notre Dame (17–4)	Virginia Tech (20–4)	UCLA (20–5)	NC State (23–5)	Indiana (24–4)	Oregon State (24–7)	Oregon State (24–7)	Indiana (26–6)	12.
13.	Texas	Ohio State (1–1)	Florida State (4–0)	Baylor (5–0)	Kansas State (7–1)	Ohio State (8–1)т	Ohio State (9–1)	Notre Dame (9–1)	Virginia Tech (10–2)	UConn (12–3)	Louisville (15–2)	Baylor (15–2)	Baylor (16–3)	LSU (19–4)	LSU (21–4)	LSU (21–4)	Colorado (20–6)	Oregon State (23–6)	Virginia Tech (24–7)	Virginia Tech (24–7)	Baylor (26–8)	13.
14.	Maryland	NC State (2–0)	Baylor (3–0)	Kansas State (6–1)	Notre Dame (6–1)	Notre Dame (7–1)	Notre Dame (8–1)	Virginia Tech (9–2)	Indiana (11–1)	Indiana (13–1)	Virginia Tech (13–3)	Indiana (16–2)	Notre Dame (15–4)	Indiana (18–3)	Indiana (20–3)	Indiana (21–3)	Indiana (22–4)	Notre Dame (23–6)	Gonzaga (29–2)	Indiana (24–5)	Gonzaga (32–4)	14.
15.	Stanford	Tennessee (1–1)	Ohio State (2–1)	Florida State (5–1)	Virginia Tech (5–2)	Indiana (8–1)	Virginia Tech (8–2)	UConn (9–3)	Utah (10–3)	Louisville (13–2)	Florida State (14–4)	Notre Dame (14–3)	USC (14–4)	Louisville (19–3)	UConn (20–5)	UConn (22–5)	Kansas State (23–5)	Gonzaga (29–2)	Indiana (24–5)	Kansas State (25–7)	Colorado (24–10)	15.
16.	North Carolina	Notre Dame (1–1)	Kansas State (4–0)	Ohio State (5–1)	Indiana (7–1)	Virginia Tech (7–2)	Indiana (8–1)	Indiana (10–1)	Notre Dame (9–2)	Gonzaga (14–2)	Indiana (14–2)	Utah (13–5)	Louisville (18–3)	Virginia Tech (18–4)	Notre Dame (18–5)	Gonzaga (26–2)	Gonzaga (28–2)	Kansas State (24–6)	Kansas State (25–6)	Gonzaga (30–3)	Ohio State (25–6)	16.
17.	Louisville	North Carolina (2–0)	Notre Dame (3–1)	Indiana (5–1)	UConn (4–3)	UConn (6–3)	UConn (7–3)	Ohio State (10–2)	Louisville (12–2)	Ohio State (11–3)	Gonzaga (16–2)	Gonzaga (18–2)	Virginia Tech (16–4)	Oregon State (17–3)	Gonzaga (24–2)	Syracuse (22–4)	Notre Dame (21–6)	Baylor (23–6)	Oklahoma (22–8)	Colorado (22–9)	Duke (22–12)	17.
18.	Florida State	Indiana (1–1)	North Carolina (4–0)	Notre Dame (5–1)	Louisville (8–1)	Louisville (9–1)	Marquette (11–0)	Marquette (12–0)	Gonzaga (13–2)	Notre Dame (10–3)	Ohio State (13–3)	Louisville (16–3)	Oregon State (17–3)	Baylor (17–4)	Louisville (20–5)	Utah (19–7)	Utah (20–8)	Colorado (21–8)	Colorado (22–9)	Oklahoma (22–9)	Virginia Tech (25–8)	18.
19.	Baylor	Louisville (2–0)	Tennessee (3–1)	Ole Miss (6–1)	Marquette (8–0)	Marquette (9–0)	Louisville (10–2)	Louisville (11–2)	Marquette (12–1)	Utah (11–4)	Notre Dame (12–3)	Virginia Tech (14–4)	Gonzaga (20–2)	Gonzaga (22–2)	Syracuse (20–4)	Notre Dame (18–6)	Syracuse (23–5)	Oklahoma (21–8)	Baylor (24–7)	Baylor (24–7)	Kansas State (26–8)	19.
20.	Colorado	Maryland (1–1)	Louisville (4–0)	Tennessee (4–2)	Florida State (6–2)	Creighton (7–1)	Gonzaga (11–2)	Gonzaga (13–2)	Ohio State (10–3)	North Carolina (11–4)	Utah (12–5)	North Carolina (14–5)	Utah (15–6)	Utah (17–6)	Creighton (20–3)	Louisville (21–6)	Oklahoma (20–7)	Syracuse (23–6)	Utah (22–10)	UNLV (30–2)	Syracuse (24–8)	20.
21.	USC	Baylor (1–1)	Indiana (3–1)	Mississippi State (8–0)	Washington State (9–1)	Gonzaga (10–2)	Creighton (8–2)т	Creighton (9–2)	Creighton (10–2)	Florida State (12–4)	Creighton (13–3)	Creighton (14–3)	Syracuse (17–3)	Creighton (18–3)	Baylor (18–5)	Creighton (21–6)	Baylor (21–6)	Creighton (24–4)	UNLV (27–2)	Utah (22–10)	Oklahoma (23–10)	21.
22.	Creighton	Creighton (1–1)	Oklahoma (5–0)	Louisville (6–1)	Creighton (6–1)	Florida State (7–3)	Florida State (8–3)т	Florida State (9–3)	Florida State (11–3)	Creighton (11–3)	Marquette (15–2)	Syracuse (16–2)	Creighton (16–3)	West Virginia (19–2)	Utah (18–7)	West Virginia (22–3)	Louisville (22–7)	Utah (21–9)	Syracuse (23–7)	Syracuse (23–7)	Utah (23–11)	22.
23.	Illinois	Ole Miss (1–1)	Washington State (5–0)	Marquette (6–0)	Gonzaga (8–2)	UNLV (9–0)	Washington (11–0)	TCU (13–0)	TCU (14–0)	Marquette (13–2)	North Carolina (12–5)	Florida State (14–6)	West Virginia (17–2)	Syracuse (18–4)	Oklahoma (17–6)	Oklahoma (18–7)	Creighton (22–4)	UNLV (26–2)	Creighton (25–5)	Louisville (24–9)	Creighton (26–6)	23.
24.	Washington State	Washington State (3–0)	Ole Miss (4–1)	North Carolina (5–2)	North Carolina (5–3)	Miami (FL) (8–0)	North Carolina (7–4)	North Carolina (8–4)	West Virginia (12–0)	West Virginia (13–1)	Iowa State (12–4)	West Virginia (16–2)	North Carolina (15–6)	Oklahoma (15–6)	West Virginia (20–3)	Baylor (19–6)	West Virginia (22–5)	Louisville (23–8)	Louisville (24–9)	Creighton (25–5)	West Virginia (25–8)	24.
25.	Mississippi State	Oklahoma (3–0)	Mississippi State (5–0)	Princeton (4–2)	Penn State (7–1)	North Carolina (6–4)	TCU (11–0)	West Virginia (11–0)	Syracuse (11–1)	UNLV (12–1)	UNLV (14–1)	Oregon State (15–3)	Princeton (15–3)	Princeton (17–3)	Princeton (18–3)	Princeton (20–3)	UNLV (24–2)	Fairfield (26–1)	Fairfield (28–1)	Fairfield (31–1)	Iowa State (21–12)	25.
	Preseason Oct. 17	Week 2 Nov. 13	Week 3 Nov. 20	Week 4 Nov. 27	Week 5 Dec. 4	Week 6 Dec. 11	Week 7 Dec. 18	Week 8 Dec. 25	Week 9 Jan. 1	Week 10 Jan. 8	Week 11 Jan. 15	Week 12 Jan. 22	Week 13 Jan. 29	Week 14 Feb. 5	Week 15 Feb. 12	Week 16 Feb. 19	Week 17 Feb. 26	Week 18 Mar. 4	Week 19 Mar. 11	Week 20 Mar. 18	Final Apr. 8	
		Dropped: No. 23 Illinois; No. 25 Mississippi State	Dropped: No. 20 Maryland; No. 22 Creighton	Dropped: No. 22 Oklahoma; No. 23 Washington State	Dropped: No. 19 Ole Miss; No. 20 Tennessee; No. 21 Mississippi State; No. 25 Princeton	Dropped: No. 21 Washington State; No. 25 Penn State	Dropped: No. 23 UNLV; No. 24 Miami (FL)	Dropped: No. 21 Washington	Dropped: No. 24 North Carolina	Dropped: No. 23 TCU; No. 25 Syracuse	Dropped: No. 24 West Virginia	Dropped: No. 22 Marquette; No. 24 Iowa State; No. 25 UNLV	Dropped: No. 23 Florida State	Dropped: No. 24 North Carolina	None	None	Dropped: No. 25 Princeton	Dropped: No. 24 West Virginia	None	None	Dropped: No. 20 UNLV; No. 23 Louisville; No. 25 Fairfield	

== USA Today Coaches Poll ==
The Coaches Poll is the second-oldest poll still in use after the AP poll. It is compiled by a rotating group of 31 college Division I head coaches. The poll operates by Borda count. Each voting member ranks teams from 1 to 25. Each team then receives points for their ranking in reverse order: Number 1 earns 25 points, number 2 earns 24 points, and so forth. The points are then combined and the team with the highest number of points is then ranked No. 1; second highest is ranked No. 2 and so forth. Only the top 25 teams with points are ranked, with teams receiving first-place votes noted the quantity next to their name. The maximum points a single team can earn is 775.

	Preseason Oct 17	Week 2 Nov 14	Week 3 Nov 21	Week 4 Nov 28	Week 5 Dec 5	Week 6 Dec 12	Week 7 Dec 19	Week 8 Dec 26	Week 9 Jan 2	Week 10 Jan 9	Week 11 Jan 16	Week 12 Jan 23	Week 13 Jan 30	Week 14 Feb 6	Week 15 Feb 13	Week 16 Feb 20	Week 17 Feb 27	Week 18 Mar 5	Week 19 Mar 12	Final Apr 8	
1.	LSU (29)	South Carolina (2–0) (23)	South Carolina (4–0) (32)	South Carolina (5–0) (32)	South Carolina (7–0) (32)	South Carolina (9–0) (32)	South Carolina (10–0) (32)	South Carolina (11–0) (32)	South Carolina (12–0) (32)	South Carolina (14–0) (32)	South Carolina (16–0) (32)	South Carolina (17–0) (32)	South Carolina (19–0) (32)	South Carolina (21–0) (32)	South Carolina (23–0) (32)	South Carolina (25–0) (32)	South Carolina (27–0) (32)	South Carolina (29–0) (32)	South Carolina (32–0) (32)	South Carolina (38–0) (32)	1.
2.	UConn (3)	Iowa (3–0) (9)	UCLA (4–0)	UCLA (6–0)	UCLA (7–0)	UCLA (9–0)	UCLA (10–0)	UCLA (11–0)	UCLA (12–0)	UCLA (14–0)	Iowa (17–1)	Kansas State (19–1)	Kansas State (20–1)	Iowa (21–2)	Ohio State (21–3)	Ohio State (22–3)	Ohio State (24–3)	Stanford (26–4)	Iowa (29–4)	Iowa (34–5)	2.
3.	Iowa	UCLA (3–0)	Stanford (4–0)	Stanford (7–0)	Iowa (8–1)	Iowa (10–1)	Iowa (11–1)	Iowa (12–1)	Iowa (13–1)	Iowa (15–1)	Colorado (15–1)	Colorado (16–2)	Stanford (19–2)	NC State (20–2)	Stanford (22–3)	Stanford (23–3)	Texas (26–3)	Iowa (26–4)	USC (26–5)	UConn (33–6)	3.
4.	South Carolina	Utah (2–0)	Colorado (4–0)	Iowa (7–1)	LSU (8–1)	NC State (10–0)	NC State (11–0)	NC State (12–0)	NC State (13–0)	LSU (15–1)	USC (13–1)	UCLA (15–2)	Iowa (19–2)	Colorado (19–3)	Iowa (22–3)	Iowa (23–3)	Virginia Tech (23–4)	Ohio State (25–4)	Texas (29–4)	NC State (31–7)	4.
5.	Virginia Tech	LSU (2–1)	LSU (5–1)	LSU (7–1)	NC State (9–0)	USC (8–0)	USC (9–0)	USC (10–0)	LSU (13–1)	Colorado (13–1)	UCLA (14–1)т	Stanford (17–2)т	NC State (18–2)	Ohio State (19–3)	Texas (22–3)	Texas (24–3)	Stanford (24–4)	LSU (26–4)	Stanford (28–5)	Texas (33–5)	5.
6.	Ohio State	Stanford (2–0)	Iowa (4–1)	Utah (5–1)	USC (7–0)	LSU (9–1)	LSU (11–1)	LSU (12–1)	USC (10–1)	USC (12–1)	NC State (15–1)т	Iowa (18–2)т	Colorado (17–3)	Stanford (20–3)	Kansas State (21–3)	NC State (23–3)	Iowa (24–4)	Texas (27–4)	LSU (28–5)	USC (29–6)	6.
7.	Utah	Colorado (3–0)	UConn (4–1)	Colorado (6–1)	Utah (7–1)	Texas (10–0)	Texas (11–0)	Texas (12–0)	Colorado (11–1)	Baylor (14–0)	Kansas State (17–1)	NC State (16–2)	Ohio State (17–3)	Kansas State (20–3)	NC State (21–3)	USC (20–4)	LSU (24–4)	UCLA (24–5)	UConn (29–5)	LSU (31–6)	7.
8.	UCLA	UConn (1–1)	Utah (4–1)	USC (5–0)	Colorado (8–1)	Colorado (9–1)	Colorado (9–1)	Colorado (10–1)	Stanford (12–1)	Stanford (14–1)	Stanford (15–2)	UConn (16–3)	UCLA (16–3)	Texas (21–3)	Colorado (20–4)	Virginia Tech (22–4)	UCLA (22–5)	USC (23–5)	UCLA (25–6)	Stanford (30–6)	8.
9.	Indiana	Virginia Tech (1–1)	Virginia Tech (3–1)	Virginia Tech (5–1)	Texas (9–0)	Stanford (8–1)	Stanford (9–1)	Stanford (10–1)	Baylor (12–0)	NC State (14–1)	LSU (16–2)	LSU (18–2)	Indiana (17–2)	UConn (19–4)	UCLA (19–4)	Kansas State (22–4)	USC (21–5)	UConn (26–5)	Ohio State (25–5)	UCLA (27–7)	9.
10.	Notre Dame	USC (3–0)т	USC (4–0)	NC State (7–0)	Stanford (8–1)	Utah (8–2)	Utah (9–2)	Utah (10–2)	Texas (13–1)	Texas (15–1)	UConn (14–3)	USC (13–3)	UConn (17–4)	UCLA (17–4)	USC (18–4)	LSU (22–4)	UConn (24–5)	NC State (25–5)	Notre Dame (26–6)	Oregon State (27–8)	10.
11.	Maryland	Ohio State (1–1)т	Texas (4–0)	Texas (7–0)	Ohio State (6–1)	Ohio State (8–1)	Baylor (9–0)	Baylor (11–0)	Virginia Tech (10–2)	Virginia Tech (12–2)	Texas (16–2)	Texas (18–2)	LSU (18–4)	USC (16–4)	LSU (21–4)	Colorado (20–5)	NC State (23–5)	Virginia Tech (23–6)	NC State (27–6)	Notre Dame (28–7)	11.
12.	Tennessee	Texas (2–0)	Ohio State (3–1)	UConn (4–2)	Notre Dame (6–1)	Notre Dame (7–1)	Notre Dame (8–1)	Notre Dame (9–1)	Utah (10–3)т	Kansas State (15–1)	Louisville (15–2)	Ohio State (15–3)	Louisville (18–3)	LSU (19–4)	Indiana (20–3)	UCLA (20–5)	Indiana (22–4)	Indiana (24–4)	Gonzaga (30–2)	Indiana (26–6)	12.
13.	Stanford	Florida State (2–0)	Florida State (4–0)	Ohio State (5–1)	Virginia Tech (5–2)	Baylor (7–0)	Ohio State (9–2)	Ohio State (10–2)	Kansas State (13–1)т	Indiana (13–1)	Baylor (14–2)	Indiana (16–2)	Baylor (16–3)	Indiana (18–3)	Virginia Tech (20–4)	UConn (23–5)	Gonzaga (28–2)	Gonzaga (29–2)	Virginia Tech (24–7)	Gonzaga (32–4)	13.
14.	Texas	Notre Dame (1–1)	Notre Dame (3–1)	Notre Dame (5–1)	Baylor (7–0)	Virginia Tech (7–2)	Virginia Tech (8–2)	Virginia Tech (9–2)	Indiana (11–1)	UConn (12–3)	Virginia Tech (13–3)	Utah (14–5)	Texas (19–3)	Notre Dame (17–4)	UConn (20–5)	Oregon State (21–4)	Kansas State (23–5)	Notre Dame (23–6)	Oregon State (24–7)	Ohio State (26–6)	14.
15.	Louisville	Louisville (2–0)	Louisville (4–0)	Florida State (5–1)	Indiana (7–1)	Indiana (8–1)	Indiana (9–1)	Indiana (10–1)	UConn (10–3)	Louisville (13–2)	Ohio State (13–3)	Baylor (15–3)	USC (14–4)	Louisville (19–4)	Oregon State (20–3)	Gonzaga (26–2)	Colorado (20–7)	Oregon State (23–6)	Indiana (24–5)	Baylor (26–8)	15.
16.	Ole Miss	North Carolina (2–0)	NC State (4–0)	Baylor (5–0)	Kansas State (7–1)	Kansas State (9–1)	Kansas State (11–1)	Kansas State (12–1)	Louisville (12–2)	Ohio State (11–3)	Indiana (14–2)	Louisville (16–3)	Notre Dame (15–4)	Gonzaga (22–2)	Gonzaga (24–2)	Indiana (21–4)	Oregon State (22–5)	Kansas State (24–6)	Kansas State (25–7)	Colorado (24–10)	16.
17.	North Carolina	Indiana (1–1)	North Carolina (4–0)	Indiana (5–1)	UConn (4–3)	Louisville (9–1)	UConn (8–3)	UConn (9–3)	Notre Dame (9–2)	Gonzaga (14–2)	Gonzaga (16–2)	Gonzaga (18–2)	Gonzaga (20–2)	Baylor (17–4)	Notre Dame (18–5)	Syracuse (22–4)	Notre Dame (21–6)	Baylor (23–6)	Colorado (22–9)	Virginia Tech (25–8)	17.
18.	Colorado	NC State (2–0)	Baylor (3–0)	Kansas State (6–1)	Louisville (8–1)	UConn (6–3)	Marquette (11–0)	Marquette (12–0)	Ohio State (10–3)	Utah (11–4)	Florida State (14–4)	Notre Dame (14–3)	Virginia Tech (16–4)	Virginia Tech (18–4)	Louisville (20–5)	Notre Dame (19–6)	Utah (20–8)	Creighton (24–4)	Baylor (24–7)	Kansas State (26–8)	18.
19.	Duke	Maryland (1–1)	Indiana (3–1)	Louisville (6–1)	Marquette (8–0)	Marquette (9–0)	Louisville (10–2)	Louisville (11–2)	Gonzaga (13–2)	Notre Dame (10–3)	Notre Dame (12–3)	Virginia Tech (14–4)	Oregon State (17–3)	Oregon State (18–3)	Creighton (20–3)	Utah (19–7)	Syracuse (23–5)	Colorado (21–8)	UNLV (28–2)	Creighton (26–6)	19.
20.	Baylor	Tennessee (2–1)	Oklahoma (5–0)	Ole Miss (6–1)	Florida State (6–2)	Creighton (7–1)	Gonzaga (11–2)	Gonzaga (13–2)	Marquette (12–1)	Florida State (12–4)	Utah (12–5)	Creighton (14–3)	Utah (15–6)	Creighton (18–3)	Syracuse (20–4)	Louisville (21–6)	Creighton (22–4)	Syracuse (23–6)	Oklahoma (22–9)	Oklahoma (23–10)	20.
21.	USC	Oklahoma (3–0)	Tennessee (3–1)	Mississippi State (8–0)	Creighton (6–1)	Gonzaga (10–2)	Creighton (8–2)	Creighton (9–2)	Creighton (10–2)	Creighton (11–3)	Creighton (13–3)	North Carolina (14–5)	Creighton (16–3)	Utah (17–6)	Baylor (18–5)	Creighton (21–4)	Baylor (21–6)	Oklahoma (21–8)	Creighton (25–5)	Duke (22–12)	21.
22.	Florida State	Duke (2–0)	Kansas State (4–0)	Tennessee (4–2)	Washington State (9–1)	Florida State (7–3)	Florida State (8–3)	Florida State (9–3)	Florida State (11–3)	North Carolina (11–4)	Marquette (15–2)	Syracuse (16–2)	West Virginia (17–2)	West Virginia (19–2)	Utah (18–7)	West Virginia (22–3)	Oklahoma (20–7)	Utah (21–9)	Utah (22–10)	Utah (23–11)	22.
23.	Oklahomaт	Baylor (1–0)	Ole Miss (5–1)	Marquette (6–0)	Gonzaga (8–2)	Miami (FL) (8–0)	Washington (11–0)	Miami (FL) (9–1)	TCU (14–0)	Marquette (13–2)	UNLV (14–1)	West Virginia (16–2)	Syracuse (17–3)	Syracuse (18–4)	West Virginia (20–3)	Princeton (20–3)	Louisville (22–7)	UNLV (26–2)	Syracuse (23–7)	Syracuse (24–8)	23.
24.	Creightonт	Creighton (2–0)	Maryland (2–2)	North Carolina (5–2)	North Carolina (5–3)	UNLV (9–0)	Miami (FL) (8–1)	Washington (11–1)	Washington (11–1)	Vanderbilt (15–1)	North Carolina (12–5)	Florida State (14–6)	North Carolina (15–6)	Princeton (17–3)	Princeton (18–3)	Baylor (19–6)	UNLV (24–2)	Louisville (23–8)	Princeton (23–4)	UNLV (30–3)	24.
25.	Miami (FL) т Michigan т	Ole Miss (1–1)	Washington State (5–0)	Creighton (5–1)	Michigan (7–1)	North Carolina (6–4)	North Carolina (7–4)	TCU (13–0)	West Virginia (12–0)	UNLV (12–1)	Syracuse (14–2)	Oregon State (15–3)	Princeton (15–3)	UNLV (19–2)	Oklahoma (17–6)	Oklahoma (18–7)	West Virginia (22–5)	Princeton (22–4)	Louisville (24–9)	West Virginia (25–8)	25.
	Preseason Oct 17	Week 2 Nov 14	Week 3 Nov 21	Week 4 Nov 28	Week 5 Dec 5	Week 6 Dec 12	Week 7 Dec 19	Week 8 Dec 26	Week 9 Jan 2	Week 10 Jan 9	Week 11 Jan 16	Week 12 Jan 23	Week 13 Jan 30	Week 14 Feb 6	Week 15 Feb 13	Week 16 Feb 20	Week 17 Feb 27	Week 18 Mar 5	Week 19 Mar 12	Final Apr 8	
		Dropped: No. 25т Miami (FL); No. 25т Michigan	Dropped: No. 22 Duke; No. 24 Creighton	Dropped: No. 20 Oklahoma; No. 24 Maryland; No. 25 Washington State	Dropped: No. 20 Ole Miss; No. 21 Mississippi State; No. 22 Tennessee	Dropped: No. 22 Washington State; No. 25 Michigan	Dropped: No. 24 UNLV	Dropped: No. 25 North Carolina	Dropped: No. 23 Miami (FL)	Dropped: No. 23 TCU; No. 24 Washington; No. 25 West Virginia	Dropped: No. 24 Vanderbilt	Dropped: No. 22 Marquette; No. 23 UNLV	Dropped: No. 24 Florida State	Dropped: No. 24 North Carolina	Dropped: No. 25 UNLV	None	Dropped: No. 23 Princeton	Dropped: No. 25 West Virginia	None	Dropped: No. 24 Princeton; No. 25 Louisville	

== See also ==
- 2023–24 NCAA Division I men's basketball rankings
