= Pac-12 Conference basketball championship game =

Pac-12 Conference basketball championship game may refer to a game in the:

- Pac-12 Conference men's basketball tournament
- Pac-12 Conference women's basketball tournament
