= Pac-12 Conference basketball championship =

Pac-12 Conference basketball championship may refer to

- Pac-12 Conference men's basketball regular season champion
- Pac-12 Conference women's basketball regular season champion
- Championship won in the Pac-12 Conference men's basketball tournament
- Championship won in the Pac-12 Conference women's basketball tournament
