= 2023–24 Pac-12 Conference women's basketball season =

- League: NCAA Division I
- Sport: Basketball
- Teams: 12
- TV partner(s): ESPN, ESPN2, ESPNU, Pac-12 Network

Regular season
- Regular season champions: Stanford
- Season MVP: Cameron Brink (Stanford)

Pac-12 tournament
- Champions: USC
- Runners-up: Stanford
- Tournament MVP: McKenzie Forbes (USC)

Seasons
- ← 2022–23 2026–27

2023–24 Pac-12 Conference women's basketball standings
	Conf.				Overall
Team	W		L	PCT	W		L	PCT
No. 9 Stanford	15	–	3	.833	30	–	6	.833
No. 5 USC †	13	–	5	.722	29	–	6	.829
No. 10 UCLA	13	–	5	.722	27	–	7	.794
No. 8 Oregon State	12	–	6	.667	27	–	8	.771
No. 15 Colorado	11	–	7	.611	24	–	10	.706
No. 22 Utah	11	–	7	.611	23	–	11	.676
Arizona	8	–	10	.444	18	–	16	.529
California	7	–	11	.389	19	–	15	.559
Washington State	7	–	11	.389	21	–	15	.583
Washington	6	–	12	.333	16	–	15	.516
Arizona State	3	–	15	.167	11	–	20	.355
Oregon	2	–	16	.111	11	–	21	.344
† 2024 Pac-12 tournament winner Rankings from AP Poll

The 2023–24 Pac-12 Conference women's basketball season began with practices in October followed by the 2023–24 NCAA Division I women's basketball season, which started on November 6, 2023. Conference play began on December 10, 2023. This is the twelfth season under the Pac–12 Conference name and the 38th since the conference first sponsored women's sports, including basketball, in the 1986–87 school year.

It was the final season of Pac-12 competition in the conference's then-current form, with UCLA, USC, Oregon & Washington moving to the Big Ten Conference; Colorado returning to its previous home of the Big 12 Conference, with Utah, Arizona & Arizona State following suit; California and Stanford moving to the Atlantic Coast Conference, and Oregon State and Washington State moving to the West Coast Conference (WCC) after the 2023–24 academic year. With Boise State, Colorado State, Fresno State, Gonzaga, San Diego State, Texas State, and Utah State joining the Pac-12 in 2026, coinciding with the end of Oregon State's and Washington State's WCC affiliation contract, Pac-12 play will resume in 2026–27.

The Pac-12 tournament took place on March 6−10, 2024 at the MGM Grand Garden Arena on the Las Vegas Strip, just outside the city limits of Las Vegas.

== Regular season ==
=== Early season tournaments ===
Team	Tournament	Finish
Arizona	Battle 4 Atlantis	3rd
Arizona State	Paradise Jam	2nd
California		
Colorado	Paradise Jam	2nd
Oregon		
Oregon State	Maui Classic	1st
Stanford	Ball Dawgs Classic	1st
UCLA	Cayman Islands Classic	1st
USC	Baha Mar Pink Flamingo Championship	1st
Utah	Great Alaska Shootout	1st
Washington		
Washington State		

=== Conference schedule ===
This table summarizes the head-to-head results between teams in conference play.

	Arizona	Arizona State	California	Colorado	Oregon	Oregon State	Stanford	UCLA	USC	Utah	Washington	Washington State
vs. Arizona	–	0–2	0–2	1–0	1–0	1–0	1–1	2–0	2–0	0–1	1–1	1–1
vs. Arizona State	2–0	–	1–1	1–0	1–0	1–0	2–0	2–0	2–0	1–0	0–2	2–0
vs. California	2–0	1–1	–	0–0	0–0	0–0	2–0	0–0	0–0	0–0	0–0	0–0
vs. Colorado	0–1	0–1	0–0	–	0–0	0–0	0–1	0–0	0–0	0–0	0–0	0–0
vs. Oregon	0–1	0–1	0–0	0–0	–	0–0	2–0	0–0	0–0	0–0	0–0	0–0
vs. Oregon State	0–1	0–1	0–0	0–0	0–0	–	2–0	0–0	0–0	0–0	0–0	0–0
vs. Stanford	1–1	0–2	0–2	1–0	0–2	0–2	–	0–1	1–0	0–1	0–2	0–2
vs. UCLA	0–2	0–2	0–0	0–0	0–0	0–0	1–0	–	0–0	0–0	0–0	0–0
vs. USC	0–2	0–2	0–0	0–0	0–0	0–0	0–1	0–0	–	0–0	0–0	0–0
vs. Utah	1–0	0–1	0–0	0–0	0–0	0–0	1–0	0–0	0–0	–	0–0	0–0
vs. Washington	1–1	2–0	0–0	0–0	0–0	0–0	2–0	0–0	0–0	0–0	–	0–0
vs. Washington State	1–1	0–2	0–0	0–0	0–0	0–0	2–0	0–0	0–0	0–0	0–0	–
Total	8–10	3–15	7–11	11–7	2–16	12–6	15–3	13–5	13–5	11–7	6–12	7–11

== Head coaches ==
Note: Stats shown are before the beginning of the season. Pac-12 records are from time at current school.

Team	Head coach	Previous job	Seasons at school	Record at school	Pac-12 record	Pac-12 titles	NCAA tournaments	NCAA Final Fours	NCAA Championships
Arizona	Adia Barnes	Washington (assistant)		0–0 (–)	0–0 (–)				
Arizona State	Natasha Adair	Delaware	2nd	8–20 (.286)	1–17 (.056)	0	0	0	0
California	Charmin Smith	New York Liberty (assistant)		0–0 (–)	0–0 (–)				
Colorado	JR Payne	Santa Clara		0–0 (–)	0–0 (–)				
Oregon	Kelly Graves	Gonzaga		0–0 (–)	0–0 (–)				
Oregon State	Scott Rueck	George Fox		0–0 (–)	0–0 (–)				
Stanford	Tara VanDerveer	Ohio State	38th	0–0 (–)	0–0 (–)				
UCLA	Cori Close	Florida State (AHC)		0–0 (–)	0–0 (–)				
USC	Lindsay Gottlieb	Cleveland Cavaliers (assistant)		0–0 (–)	0–0 (–)				
Utah	Lynne Roberts	Pacific		0–0 (–)	0–0 (–)				
Washington	Tina Langley	Rice		0–0 (–)	0–0 (–)				
Washington State	Kamie Ethridge	Northern Colorado		0–0 (–)	0–0 (–)				

== See also ==
- 2023–24 Pac-12 Conference men's basketball season
