= Kaitlyn Davis =

American basketball player (born 2001)

Free agent
- Title: Guard-Forward (Swingman)

Personal information
- Born: June 27, 2001 (age 25) Norwalk, Connecticut, U.S.
- Listed height: 6 ft 2 in (1.88 m)

Career information
- High school: Greenwich Academy (Greenwich, Connecticut)
- College: Columbia (2019–2023); University of Southern California (2024–present)
- WNBA draft: 2024: 3rd round, 35th overall pick
- Drafted by: New York Liberty
- Playing career: 2024–present
- Position: Forward

Career history
- 2024: Rojas de Veracruz
- 2024: Atenienses de Manatí

Career highlights
- 2x First-team All-Ivy (2022, 2023)
- Stats at WNBA.com
- Stats at Basketball Reference

Kaitlyn Davis (born June 27, 2001) is an American professional basketball player who is currently a free agent. She played college basketball for Columbia University and the University of Southern California (USC).

== Early life ==
Davis was born in Norwalk, Connecticut to Cynthia and Victor Davis. She has two siblings named Olivia and Victor. Her twin sister Olivia Davis played college basketball for Hamilton College. Her cousin RJ Davis also plays college basketball, for the University of North Carolina.

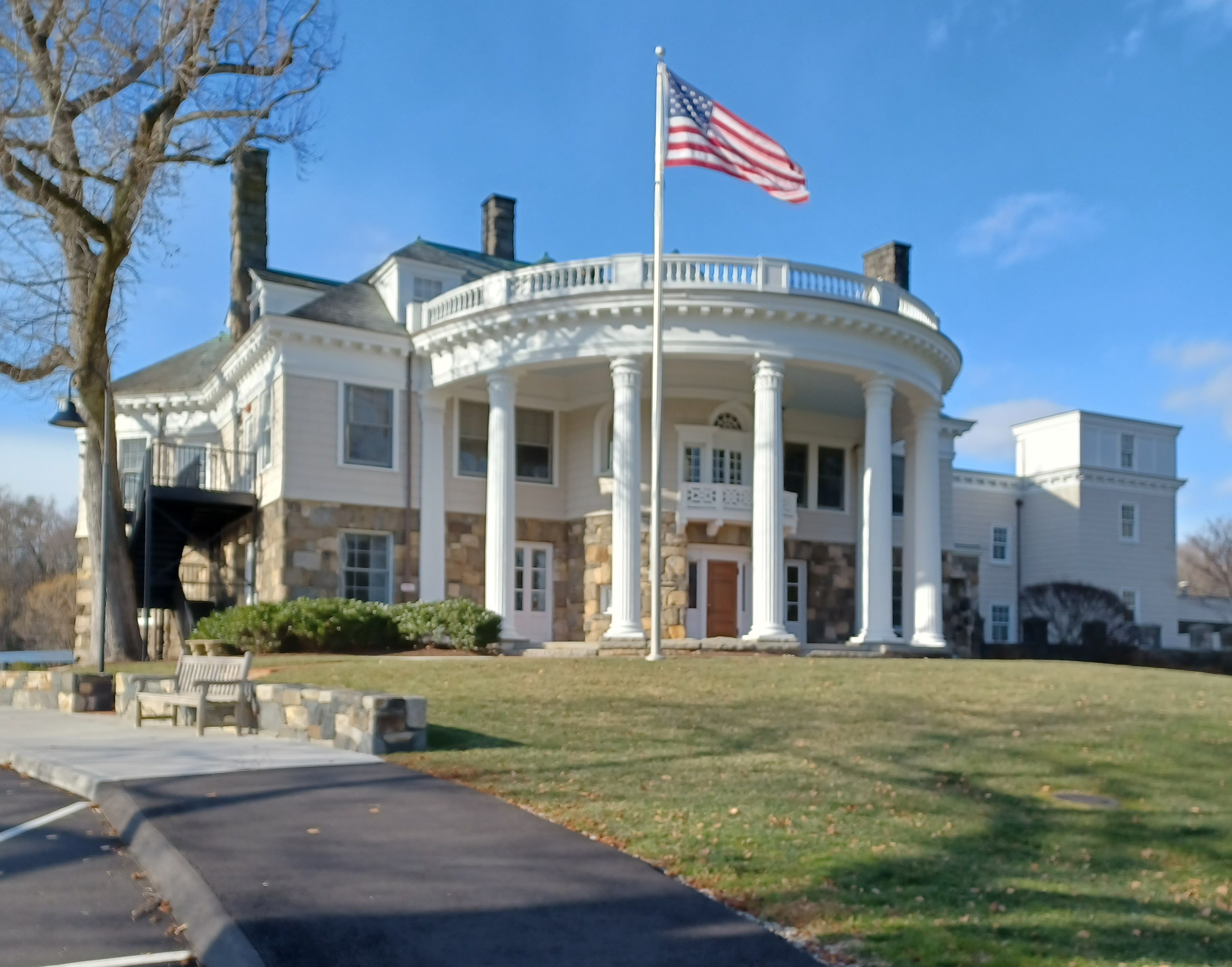
Greenwich Academy in Greenwich, Connecticut, where Davis attended for five years.

She names Breanna Stewart as a personal inspiration, and is a fan of both the New York Liberty and the Connecticut Sun.

== High school career ==
Davis attended and played high school basketball at Greenwich Academy in Greenwich, Connecticut for five years. She joined the varsity team in eight grade, and averaged 16.6 points per game in her debut season. Her career best was 21 points and 12.3 rebounds average in the 2015–16 season. She scored 1,305 points in five years and had a career best of 33 points in one game. She graduated from Greenwich Academy in 2019. She also played club basketball with the Connecticut Basketball Club on the Amateur Athletic Union circuit.

== College career ==
Davis debuted in the 2019–20 season with the Columbia University Lions, where she played in 24 games and started in eight games. She led her team and was seventh in the Ivy League with 22 blocks per game. She was named Ivy League Rookie of the Week in February 2020.

After skipping the 2020–21 season due to the COVID-19 pandemic, Davis returned to Columbia for her junior season of 2021–22. She started in all 32 games throughout the season, averaging 13.1 points, 8.3 rebounds, 2.5 assists, and 1.2 blocks. Davis ranked top 10 in the Ivy League in rebounds, steals, and blocks. She was named to the First Team All-Ivy League and Second Team All-Met (Metropolitan Basketball Writers Association), and was named Ivy League Player of the Week four times combined in 2020 and 2021. She achieved weekly honor roll six times.

In the 2022–23 season, Davis averaged 13.6 points, 8.3 rebounds, 3.7 assists, and 1.6 steals per game. She had 34 total blocks. She started and played in all 34 games in the season, and ranked sixth in Columbia's all-time history with 281 rebounds in a single season. She had a 51% shooting average from the floor (178/349). She was unanimously named to First Team All-Ivy League and Second Team All-Met. She achieved weekly honor roll seven times. Davis became the 13th player in Columbia program history to reach 1,000 career points, and was named to the Women's National Invitation Tournament (WNIT) All-Tournament Team.

In her time at Columbia, she scored 1,083 career points and 679 career rebounds, eight and seventh in program history respectively. She was the first player in program history to achieve a triple-double.

Davis transferred to USC for the 2023–24 season while she pursues a postgraduate education. USC head coach Lindsay Gottlieb describes Davis as "a high-level performer" and praises her versatility on the court. She scored 180 points and started consistently. Her season highs were 16 points, 16 rebounds, 5 assists, 3 blocks, and 4 steals. She helped her team to the Elite Eight round of the 2024 NCAA tournament, losing to the UConn Huskies.

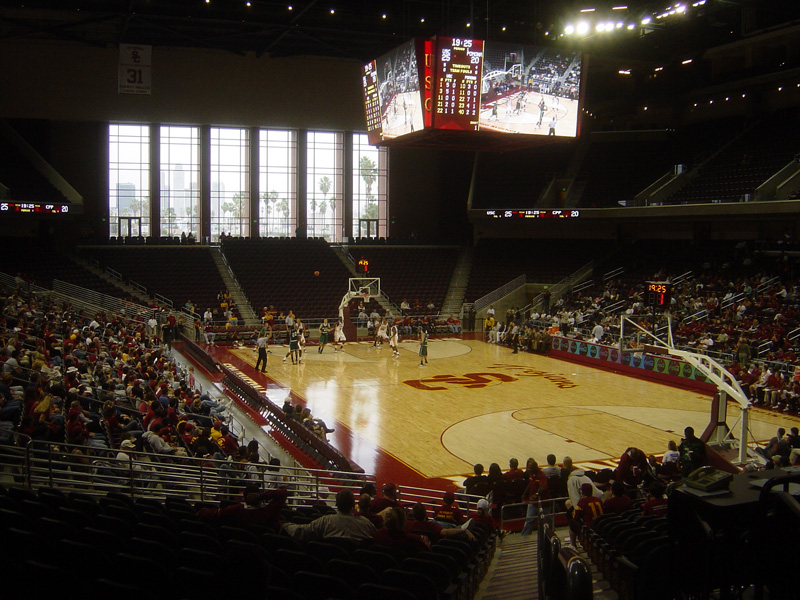
Galen Center, USC's basketball stadium.

== Professional career ==
Davis declared for the 2024 WNBA draft and was drafted in the third round, 35th overall, by the New York Liberty. She did not join the training camp before the 2024 season. She joined the Liberty training camp for the 2025 season, but was waived on May 2.

Davis played with Rojas de Veracruz of the Mexican LNBP during the 2024 season. She averaged 9.1 points, 5.6 rebounds, 1.0 assists, and 1.2 steals per game. She then joined Atenienses de Manatí of the Baloncesto Superior Nacional Femenino.

== Career statistics ==
Legend
GP	Games played	GS	Games started	MPG	Minutes per game	RPG	Rebounds per game
APG	Assists per game	SPG	Steals per game	BPG	Blocks per game	PPG	Points per game
TO	Turnovers per game	FG%	Field-goal percentage	3P%	3-point field-goal percentage	FT%	Free-throw percentage
**Bold**	Career best	°	League leader

=== College ===
Year	Team	GP	GS	MPG	FG%	3P%	FT%	RPG	APG	SPG	BPG	TO	PPG
2019–20	Columbia	24	8	21.5	40.2	21.9	67.8	5.5	1.4	1.0	0.9	2.1	8.4
2020–21	Columbia	Season cancelled due to COVID-19 pandemic											
2021–22	Columbia	32	32	**28.4**	47.7	**25.6**	68.9	**8.3**	2.5	**1.6**	**1.3**	3.3	13.1
2022–23	Columbia	**34**	**34**	**28.4**	51.0	25.0	**70.1**	**8.3**	**3.7**	**1.6**	0.8	2.6	**13.6**
2023–24	USC	30	24	26.0	**54.4**	0.0	58.2	5.8	1.7	0.8	0.6	**1.0**	6.0
**Career**		120	98	26.4	48.5	23.6	67.6	7.1	2.4	1.3	0.9	2.3	10.5
Statistics retrieved from Sports-Reference.

== Personal life ==
Davis earned her bachelor's degree at Columbia University, and is currently pursuing a master's degree in entrepreneurship and innovation at USC.
