= 2024 Pac-12 Conference women's basketball tournament =

- Classification: Division I
- Season: 2023–24
- Teams: 12
- Site: MGM Grand Garden Arena; Las Vegas, NV
- Champions: USC (2nd title)
- Winning coach: Lindsay Gottlieb (1st title)
- MVP: McKenzie Forbes (USC)
- Television: Pac-12 Network, ESPN

2023–24 Pac-12 Conference women's basketball standings
	Conf.				Overall
Team	W		L	PCT	W		L	PCT
No. 9 Stanford	15	–	3	.833	30	–	6	.833
No. 5 USC †	13	–	5	.722	29	–	6	.829
No. 10 UCLA	13	–	5	.722	27	–	7	.794
No. 8 Oregon State	12	–	6	.667	27	–	8	.771
No. 15 Colorado	11	–	7	.611	24	–	10	.706
No. 22 Utah	11	–	7	.611	23	–	11	.676
Arizona	8	–	10	.444	18	–	16	.529
California	7	–	11	.389	19	–	15	.559
Washington State	7	–	11	.389	21	–	15	.583
Washington	6	–	12	.333	16	–	15	.516
Arizona State	3	–	15	.167	11	–	20	.355
Oregon	2	–	16	.111	11	–	21	.344
† 2024 Pac-12 tournament winner Rankings from AP Poll

The 2024 Pac-12 Conference women's basketball tournament (branded as the 2024 Pac-12 Women's Basketball Tournament presented by Acura for sponsorship reasons). was a postseason women's basketball tournament held from March 6–10, 2024, at MGM Grand Garden Arena on the Las Vegas Strip in Paradise, Nevada. As the tournament champion, USC earned the conference's automatic bid to the NCAA tournament.

== Seeds ==
The bracket will be set in March 2024. All 12 schools are scheduled to participate in the tournament. The seedings will be determined upon completion of the regular season play. The winning percentage of the teams in conference play will determined tournament seedings. There are tiebreaker in place to Seed teams with identical record. Top four teams receive a bye to the quarterfinals. Tie-breaking procedures for determining all tournament seeding is:

- For two-team tie:
1. Results of head-to-head competition during the regular season.
2. Each team's record (won-lost percentage) vs. the team occupying the highest position in the final regular standings, and then continuing down through the standings until one team gains an advantage. When arriving at another group of tied teams while comparing records, use each team's record (won-lost percentage) against the collective tied teams as a group (prior to that group's own tie-breaking procedure), rather than the performance against individual tied teams.
3. Won-lost percentage against all Division I opponents.
4. Coin toss conducted by the Commissioner or designee.
- For multiple-team tie:
1. Results (won-lost percentage) of collective head-to-head competition during the regular season among the tied teams.
2. If more than two teams are still tied, each of the tied team's record (won-lost percentage) vs. the team occupying the highest position in the final regular season standings, and then continuing down through the standings, eliminating teams with inferior records, until one team gains an advantage.
  When arriving at another group of tied teams while comparing records, use each team's record (won-lost percentage) against the collective tied teams as a group (prior to that group's own tie-breaking procedure), rather than the performance against individual tied teams. After one team has an advantage and is seeded, all remaining teams in the multiple-team tie-breaker will repeat the multiple-team tie-breaking procedure. If at any point the multiple-team tie is reduced to two teams, the two-team tie-breaking procedure will be applied.
3. Won-lost percentage against all Division I opponents.
4. Coin toss conducted by the Commissioner or designee.

Seed	School	Conf.	Over.	Tiebreak 1	Tiebreak 2
#1	Stanford	15–3	26–4		
#2	USC	13–5	23–5	1–1 vs UCLA	1–0 vs Stanford
#3	UCLA	13–5	24–5	1–1 vs USC	0–1 vs Stanford
#4	Oregon State	12–6	23–6		
#5	Colorado	11–7	21–8	1–1 vs Utah	1–0 vs Stanford
#6	Utah	11–7	21–9	1–1 vs Colorado	0–1 vs Stanford
#7	Arizona	8–10	16–14		
#8	California	7–11	19–13	2–0 vs Washington State	
#9	Washington State	7–11	17–13	0–2 vs California	
#10	Washington	6–12	16–13		
#11	Arizona State	3–15	11–19		
#12	Oregon	2–16	11–20		

== Schedule ==
Session	Game	Time	Matchup	Score	Television	Attendance
First Round – Wednesday, March 6
1	1	12:00 pm	No. 5 Colorado vs. No. 12 Oregon	79–30	P12N	
1	2	2:30 pm	No. 8 California vs. No. 9 Washington State	65–44	P12N	
2	3	6:00 pm	No. 7 Arizona vs. No. 10 Washington	58–50	P12N	4,372
2	4	8:30 pm	No. 6 Utah vs. No. 11 Arizona State	71–60	P12N	4,372
Quarterfinals – Thursday, March 7
3	5	12:00 pm	No. 4 Oregon State vs. No. 5 Colorado	85–79^{2OT}	P12N	4,883
3	6	2:30 pm	No. 1 Stanford vs. No. 8 California	71–57	P12N	4,883
4	7	6:00 pm	No. 2 USC vs. No. 7 Arizona	65–62	P12N	4,901
4	8	8:30 pm	No. 3 UCLA vs. No. 6 Utah	67–57	P12N	4,901
Semifinals – Friday, March 8
5	9	5:00 pm	No. 4 Oregon State vs. No. 1 Stanford	57–66	P12N	5,713
5	10	7:30 pm	No. 2 USC vs. No. 3 UCLA	80–70^{2OT}	P12N	5,713
Championship Game – Sunday, March 10
6	11	2:00 pm	No. 1 Stanford vs. No. 2 USC	61–74	ESPN	5,526
Game times in PT. Rankings denote tournament seeds.

== Bracket ==
First Round; Wednesday, March 6 P12N
5	Colorado	79
12	Oregon	30
8	California	65
9	Washington State	44
7	Arizona	58
10	Washington	50
6	Utah	71
11	Arizona State	60

Quarterfinals; Thursday, March 7 P12N
4	Oregon State	85**
5	Colorado	79
1	Stanford	71
8	California	57
2	USC	65
7	Arizona	62
3	UCLA	67
6	Utah	57

Semifinals; Friday, March 8 P12N
4	Oregon State	57
1	Stanford	66
2	USC	80**
3	UCLA	70

Championship Game; Sunday, March 10; ESPN
1	Stanford	61
2	USC	74

Note: * denotes overtime

=== Pac-12 All-Tournament team ===
- MVP: McKenzie Forbes, USC
- Raegan Beers, Oregon State
- Cameron Brink, Stanford
- Kiki Iriafen, Stanford
- Charisma Osborne, UCLA
- JuJu Watkins, USC

== See also ==
- 2024 Pac-12 Conference men's basketball tournament
