= 2023–24 Washington State Cougars women's basketball team =

2023–24 Washington State Cougars women's basketball

WBIT, Semifinals
- Conference: Pac-12 Conference
- Record: 21–15 (7–11 Pac-12)
- Head coach: Kamie Ethridge (6th season)
- Assistant coaches: Laurie Koehn; Camille Williams; Matt Smith
- Home arena: Beasley Coliseum

2023–24 Pac-12 Conference women's basketball standings
	Conf.				Overall
Team	W		L	PCT	W		L	PCT
No. 9 Stanford	15	–	3	.833	30	–	6	.833
No. 5 USC †	13	–	5	.722	29	–	6	.829
No. 10 UCLA	13	–	5	.722	27	–	7	.794
No. 8 Oregon State	12	–	6	.667	27	–	8	.771
No. 15 Colorado	11	–	7	.611	24	–	10	.706
No. 22 Utah	11	–	7	.611	23	–	11	.676
Arizona	8	–	10	.444	18	–	16	.529
California	7	–	11	.389	19	–	15	.559
Washington State	7	–	11	.389	21	–	15	.583
Washington	6	–	12	.333	16	–	15	.516
Arizona State	3	–	15	.167	11	–	20	.355
Oregon	2	–	16	.111	11	–	21	.344
† 2024 Pac-12 tournament winner Rankings from AP Poll

The 2023–24 Washington State Cougars women's basketball team represented Washington State University during the 2023–24 NCAA Division I women's basketball season. The Cougars were led by sixth-year head coach Kamie Ethridge and they played their home games at Beasley Coliseum as members of the Pac-12 Conference. They were invited to compete in the inaugural 2024 WBIT as a number one-seeded team. This was the team's be final season as a Pac-12 member, as they were to join West Coast Conference as affiliate member for the next two years.

== Previous season ==
The Cougars went 23–11, 9–9 in Pac-12 play to finish in seventh place. They defeated California, Utah, Colorado and UCLA to win their first ever Pac-12 women's tournament and received an automatic bid to the NCAA women's tournament. They received the number 5 seed in the Greenville Regional 2. They were upset in the first round by number 12 seed Florida Gulf Coast.

== Offseason ==
=== Departures ===
Washington State departures
Name	Num	Pos.	Height	Year	Hometown	Reason for departure
Kaia Woods	0	G	5'3"	Sophomore	Tiffin, OH	Transferred to Akron
Emma Nankervis	3	G	6'3"	Senior	Mount Eliza, Australia	Graduated
Ula Motuga	15	F	6'0"	GS senior	Logan, Australia	Graduated
Grace Sarver	20	G	5'8"	Senior	Seattle, WA	Graduated
Lauren Glazier	25	F/C	6'4"	Freshman	North Bend, WA	Transferred to Pacific

=== Incoming ===
Washington State incoming transfers
Name	Num	Pos.	Height	Year	Hometown	Previous school
Beyonce Bea	25	G/F	6'1"	GS senior	Washougal, WA	Idaho

==== Recruiting ====
College recruiting
Name	Hometown	School	Height	Weight	Commit date
Jenna Villa; G	Arlington, WA	Arlington High School	6 ft 1 in (1.85 m)	N/A	
Jenna Villa; G	Recruit ratings: ESPN: (93)				
Overall recruit ranking:
Note: In many cases, Scout, Rivals, 247Sports, On3, and ESPN may conflict in their listings of height and weight.; In these cases, the average was taken. ESPN grades are on a 100-point scale.; Sources: "2023 Player Commits". ESPN. Archived from the original on January 18, 2023.

== Roster ==
2023–24 Washington State Cougars women's basketball team
Players
Coaches

Pos.	#	Name	Height	Year	Previous school	Hometown
G	1	Tara Wallack	6 ft 2 in (1.88 m)	Jr	Semiahmoo Secondary	South Surrey, BC
C	3	Candace Kpetikou	6 ft 3 in (1.91 m)	Fr	Saint Joseph HS	Niamey, Niger
G	5	Charlisse Leger-Walker (injured)	5 ft 10 in (1.78 m)	Sr	St. Peter's School	Waikato, New Zealand
G	10	Eleonora Villa	5 ft 8 in (1.73 m)	Fr	Costa Masnaga	Lissone, Italy
G	11	Astera Tuhina	5 ft 9 in (1.75 m)	So	Deportivo Promete	Pristina, Kosovo
G	12	Kyra Gardner	5 ft 11 in (1.8 m)	So	Raymond HS	Raymond, WA
C	14	Jessica Clarke	6 ft 3 in (1.91 m)	Sr	St. Thomas Aquinas	North Vancouver, BC
G	21	Johanna Teder (injured)	5 ft 8 in (1.73 m)	GS	Audentese spordigümnaasium South Plains College	Tartu, Estonia
G/F	25	Beyonce Bea	6 ft 1 in (1.85 m)	GS	Washougal HS; Idaho	Washougal, WA
C	33	Alex Covill	6 ft 6 in (1.98 m)	Fr	Hellgate HS	Missoula, MT
G	34	Jenna Villa	6 ft 1 in (1.85 m)	Fr	Arlington HS	Arlington, WA
G	45	Cia Eklöf	5 ft 10 in (1.78 m)	RS Fr	Mäkelänrinteen Lukio	Helsinki, Finland
C	55	Bella Murekatete	6 ft 3 in (1.91 m)	GS	Genesis Prep Academy	Ngoma Huye, Nigeria

Head coach

- Kamie Ethridge (Texas)

Assistant coach(es)

- Laurie Koehn (Kansas State)
- Camille Williams (Wisconsin)
- Matt Smith

Legend

- (C) Team captain
- (S) Suspended
- (I) Ineligible
- (W) Walk-on
- Injured
- Current redshirt

Roster

== Schedule and results ==
Date time, TV	Rank^{#}	Opponent^{#}	Result	Record	High points	High rebounds	High assists	Site (attendance) city, state
Exhibition
October 29, 2023*; 12:00 p.m.	No. 24	Montana Western	W 92–51		17 – Leger-Walker	11 – Murekatete	7 – Leger-Walker	Beasley Coliseum; Pullman, WA
Regular season
November 7, 2023*; 4:00 p.m.	No. 24	Cal Poly	W 78–61	1–0	18 – Murekatete	9 – Bea	9 – Leger-Walker	Beasley Coliseum (468); Pullman, WA
November 9, 2023*; 7:00 p.m.	No. 24	Gonzaga	W 77–72 ^{OT}	2–0	26 – Leger-Walker	11 – Bea	4 – Leger-Walker	Beasley Coliseum (1,587); Pullman, WA
November 12, 2023*; 2:30 p.m.	No. 24	Idaho State	W 64–47	3–0	16 – Murekatete	8 – Covill	5 – Wallack	Beasley Coliseum (924); Pullman, WA
November 14, 2023*; 6:00 p.m., ESPN+	No. 24	at Montana	W 61–49	4–0	22 – Murekatete	11 – Murekatete	3 – Tied	Dahlberg Arena (2,359); Missoula, MT
November 19, 2023*; 6:00 p.m., ESPN+	No. 24	at Prairie View A&M	W 81–43	5–0	17 – Leger-Walker	9 – Murekatete	4 – Tuhina	William J. Nicks Building (426); Prairie View, TX
November 23, 2023*; 8:00 a.m., FloHoops	No. 23	vs. Maryland; Cancún Challenge Mayan Division	W 87–67	6–0	17 – Murekatete	15 – Leger-Walker	13 – Leger-Walker	Moon Palace Golf & Spa Resort (150); Cancún, Mexico
November 24, 2023*; 8:00 a.m., FloHoops	No. 23	vs. UMass; Cancún Challenge Mayan Division	W 90–48	7–0	15 – E. Villa	9 – Leger-Walker	10 – Tuhina	Moon Palace Golf & Spa Resort (71); Cancún, Mexico
November 25, 2023*; 10:30 a.m., FloHoops	No. 23	vs. Green Bay; Cancún Challenge Mayan Division	L 48–59	7–1	17 – Leger-Walker	6 – Tied	3 – Tied	Moon Palace Golf & Spa Resort (136); Cancún, Mexico
November 29, 2023*; 7:00 p.m.		Texas A&M–Commerce	W 111–50	8–1	22 – Murekatete	18 – Murekatete	13 – Tuhina	Beasley Coliseum (805); Pullman, WA
December 1, 2023*; 4:00 p.m.		UC Davis	W 77–52	9–1	19 – Tuhina	10 – Leger-Walker	4 – Tied	Beasley Coliseum (840); Pullman, WA
December 5, 2023*; 4:00 p.m., Midco	No. 21	at South Dakota State	W 69–64	10–1	18 – Tuhina	7 – Murekatete	4 – Leger-Walker	Frost Arena (1,827); Brookings, SD
December 10, 2023; 1:00 p.m., P12N	No. 21	Washington	L 55–60	10–2 (0–1)	19 – Murekatete	6 – Murekatete	5 – Tuhina	Beasley Coliseum (1,455); Pullman, WA
December 17, 2023*; 2:00 p.m., P12N		Houston	W 95–48	11–2	21 – Wallack	14 – Murekatete	11 – Leger-Walker	Beasley Coliseum (956); Pullman, WA
December 20, 2023*; 12:00 p.m., SECN+/ESPN+		at Auburn	L 62–69	11–3	15 – Tuhina	9 – Leger-Walker	10 – Leger-Walker	Neville Arena (2,341); Auburn, AL
January 5, 2024; 7:00 p.m., P12N		at No. 8 Stanford	L 65–74	11–4 (0–2)	22 – Leger-Walker	9 – Tied	4 – Tied	Maples Pavilion (3,084); Stanford, CA
January 7, 2024; 12:00 p.m., P12N		at California	L 72–73 ^{OT}	11–5 (0–3)	20 – Leger-Walker	8 – Murekatete	5 – Wallack	Haas Pavilion (1,249); Berkeley, CA
January 14, 2024; 12:00 p.m., P12N		at Washington	W 72–59	12–5 (1–3)	16 – E. Villa	10 – Bea	5 – Leger-Walker	Alaska Airlines Arena (4,104); Seattle, WA
January 19, 2024; 7:00 p.m., P12N		Arizona State	W 79–64	13–5 (2–3)	16 – Tied	7 – Tied	4 – Tied	Beasley Coliseum (1,042); Pullman, WA
January 21, 2024; 12:00 p.m., P12N		Arizona	W 78–57	14–5 (3–3)	20 – Wallack	11 – Murekatete	11 – Leger-Walker	Beasley Coliseum (1,232); Pullman, WA
January 26, 2024; 7:00 p.m., P12N		at No. 11 USC	L 62–70	14–6 (3–4)	21 – Wallack	7 – Murekatete	7 – Leger-Walker	Galen Center (2,671); Los Angeles, CA
January 28, 2024; 1:00 p.m., P12N		at No. 2 UCLA	W 85–82	15–6 (4–4)	20 – Murekatete	7 – Murekatete	4 – Murekatete	Pauley Pavilion (7,241); Los Angeles, CA
February 2, 2024; 7:00 p.m., P12N		No. 6 Colorado	L 57–63	15–7 (4–5)	19 – Wallack	10 – Murekatete	3 – Murekatete	Beasley Coliseum (1,154); Pullman, WA
February 4, 2024; 12:00 p.m., P12N		No. 20 Utah	L 61–73	15–8 (4–6)	15 – Tied	10 – Wallack	3 – Tied	Beasley Coliseum (1,700); Pullman, WA
February 9, 2024; 7:00 p.m., P12N		California	L 59–66	15–9 (4–7)	17 – E. Villa	6 – Bea	4 – Bea	Beasley Coliseum (1,023); Pullman, WA
February 11, 2024; 1:00 p.m., P12N		No. 6 Stanford	L 58–73	15–10 (4–8)	16 – E. Villa	7 – Bea	3 – Wallack	Beasley Coliseum (1,304); Pullman, WA
February 16, 2024; 5:00 p.m., P12N		at Arizona	L 45–64	15–11 (4–9)	16 – E. Villa	9 – Bea	3 – Wallack	McKale Center (7,383); Tucson, AZ
February 18, 2024; 11:00 a.m., P12N		at Arizona State	W 73–46	16–11 (5–9)	23 – Wallack	13 – Bea	5 – Tuhina	Desert Financial Arena (2,021); Tempe, AZ
February 23, 2024; 7:00 p.m., P12N		No. 9 Oregon State	L 52–65	16–12 (5–10)	14 – Murekatete	8 – Murekatete	5 – Tuhina	Beasley Coliseum (1,853); Pullman, WA
February 25, 2024; 12:00 p.m., P12N		Oregon	W 71–61	17–12 (6–10)	24 – Tuhina	9 – Murekatete	5 – Tuhina	Beasley Coliseum (1,331); Pullman, WA
February 29, 2024; 2:00 p.m., P12N		at No. 18 Utah	L 67–82	17–13 (6–11)	14 – Murekatete	4 – Tied	4 – E. Villa	Jon M. Huntsman Center (4,691); Salt Lake City, UT
March 2, 2024; 12:00 p.m., P12N		at No. 13 Colorado	W 72–63	18–13 (7–11)	20 – E. Villa	7 – Bea	5 – Wallack	CU Events Center (7,491); Boulder, CO
Pac-12 Women's Tournament
March 6, 2024; 2:30 p.m., P12N	(9)	vs. (8) California; First Round	L 44–65	18–14	17 – Villa	9 – Bea	3 – Tuhina	MGM Grand Garden Arena; Paradise, NV
WBIT
March 21, 2024*; 6:00 p.m., ESPN+	(1)	Lamar; First round	W 66–46	19–14	15 – Wallack	10 – Bea	6 – Tuhina	Beasley Coliseum (490); Pullman, WA
March 24, 2024*; 1:00 p.m., ESPN+	(1)	(4) Santa Clara; Second round	W 73–47	20–14	14 – Tuhina	11 – Bea	4 – Tied	Beasley Coliseum (674); Pullman, WA
March 28, 2024*; 6:00 p.m., ESPN+	(1)	(2) Toledo; Quarterfinals	W 63–61	21–14	15 – Villa	12 – Bea	4 – Villa	Beasley Coliseum (901); Pullman, WA
April 1, 2024*; 2:00 p.m., ESPNU	(1)	vs. (4) Illinois; Semifinals	L 58–81	21–15	20 – Tuhina	9 – Murekatete	3 – Tied	Hinkle Fieldhouse (1,748); Indianapolis, IN
*Non-conference game. ^{#}Rankings from AP Poll. (#) Tournament seedings in parentheses. All times are in Pacific Time.

== Rankings ==
Ranking movements Legend: ██ Increase in ranking ██ Decrease in ranking — = Not ranked RV = Received votes
	Week																				
Poll	Pre	1	2	3	4	5	6	7	8	9	10	11	12	13	14	15	16	17	18	19	Final
AP	24	24	23	RV	21	RV	RV	RV	—	—	—	RV	RV	—	—	—	—	—	—	—	Not released
Coaches	RV	RV	25	RV	22	RV	RV	—	—	—	—	—	RV	—	—	—	—	—	—	—	

== See also ==
- 2023–24 Washington State Cougars men's basketball team
