= 2023–24 Arizona State Sun Devils women's basketball team =

American college basketball season

2023–24 Arizona State Sun Devils women's basketball
- Conference: Pac-12 Conference
- Record: 11–20 (3–15 Pac-12)
- Head coach: Natasha Adair (2nd season)
- Associate head coach: Darrell Mosley
- Assistant coaches: Mykala Walker; Camille Collier
- Home arena: Desert Financial Arena

2023–24 Pac-12 Conference women's basketball standings
	Conf.				Overall
Team	W		L	PCT	W		L	PCT
No. 9 Stanford	15	–	3	.833	30	–	6	.833
No. 5 USC †	13	–	5	.722	29	–	6	.829
No. 10 UCLA	13	–	5	.722	27	–	7	.794
No. 8 Oregon State	12	–	6	.667	27	–	8	.771
No. 15 Colorado	11	–	7	.611	24	–	10	.706
No. 22 Utah	11	–	7	.611	23	–	11	.676
Arizona	8	–	10	.444	18	–	16	.529
California	7	–	11	.389	19	–	15	.559
Washington State	7	–	11	.389	21	–	15	.583
Washington	6	–	12	.333	16	–	15	.516
Arizona State	3	–	15	.167	11	–	20	.355
Oregon	2	–	16	.111	11	–	21	.344
† 2024 Pac-12 tournament winner Rankings from AP Poll

The 2023–24 Arizona State women's basketball team represented Arizona State University during the 2023–24 NCAA Division I women's basketball season. The Sun Devils were led by second-year head coach Natasha Adair. They play their home games at the Desert Financial Arena and competed as members of the Pac-12 Conference. They finished the season 11–20, 3–15 in Pac-12 play to finish in eleventh place. They lost in the first round of the Pac-12 women's tournament to Utah.

This was also the last season that Arizona State played in the Pac-12 Conference before moving to the Big 12 Conference.

== Previous season ==
The Sun Devils finished the season 8–20, 1–17 in Pac-12 play to finish in last place. They lost in the first round of the Pac-12 women's tournament to UCLA.

== Offseason ==
=== Departures ===
Arizona State departures
Name	Num	Pos.	Height	Year	Hometown	Reason for departure
Tatum Settlelmyer	5	G	6'0"	Sophomore	St. Charles, IL	Walk-on; left the team
Sydney Erikstrup	11	G	6'1"	Junior	Portland, OR	Transferred to Grand Canyon
Kayla Mokwuah	24	C	6'4"	GS senior	Longmeadow, MS	Graduated
Meg Newman	42	F	6'3"	Sophomore	Indianapolis, IN	Transferred to Alabama
Imogen Greenslade	43	C	6'4"	Junior	Sydney, Australia	Transferred to Montana

=== Incoming ===
Arizona State incoming transfers
Name	Num	Pos.	Height	Year	Hometown	Previous school
Kadidia Toure	1	F	6'2"	Sophomore	Silver Spring, MD	James Madison
Sandra Magolico	13	F	6'2"	Junior	Maputo, Mozambique	New Mexico JC
Hanna Miller	21	F	6'1"	Sophomore	Aberdeen, SD	Dodge City CC
Jalyn Brown	23	G	6'0"	Sophomore	Baltimore, MD	Louisville
Adison Novosel	25	G	5'11"	Junior	Richfield, OH	Saint Francis (PA)

==== Recruiting ====
There was no recruiting class of 2023.

== Roster ==
2023–24 Arizona State Sun Devils women's basketball team
Players
Coaches

Pos.	#	Name	Height	Year	Previous school	Hometown
G	0	Jaylah Robinson	5 ft 11 in (1.8 m)	So	Mastery Charter School	Philadelphia, PA
F	1	Kadidia Toure	6 ft 3 in (1.91 m)	So	Our Lady of Good Counsel HS; James Madison	Silver Spring, MD
G	2	Jaddan Simmons	5 ft 9 in (1.75 m)	Sr	Green Bay Southwest HS	Green Bay, WI
G	3	Tyi Skinner	5 ft 5 in (1.65 m)	Sr	TPLS Christian Academy; Delaware	Washington, D.C.
G	4	Trayanna Crisp	5 ft 8 in (1.73 m)	So	Millennium HS	Goodyear, AZ
G/F	10	Marina Radocaj	6 ft 2 in (1.88 m)	Fr	R.A. Mcmath Secondary School	Richmond, BC
G/F	11	Maggie Besselink	6 ft 3 in (1.91 m)	Sr	Holy Cross HS	Kingston, ON
G	12	Treasure Hunt	6 ft 2 in (1.88 m)	Sr	Hamilton Heights Christian Academy; Kentucky	Chattanooga, TN
F	13	Sandra Magolico	6 ft 2 in (1.88 m)	Jr	Escola Secundária da Polana; New Mexico JC	Maputo, Mozambique
C	20	Kiley Sours-Miller	6 ft 4 in (1.93 m)	Fr	Dream City Christian	Surprise, AZ
F	21	Hanna Miller	6 ft 2 in (1.88 m)	So	Aberdeen Christian School; Dodge City CC	Aberdeen, SD
F	22	Journey Thompson	6 ft 3 in (1.91 m)	So	Peters Township HS	McMurray, PA
G	23	Jalyn Brown	6 ft 0 in (1.83 m)	So	Saint Frances Academy; Louisville	Baltimore, MD
F	24	Mallory Miller	6 ft 4 in (1.93 m)	Fr	Wolsey-Wessington HS	Aberdeen, SD
G	25	Adison Novosel	5 ft 11 in (1.8 m)	Jr	Revere HS; Saint Francis (PA)	Richfield, OH
F	30	Morasha Wiggins	6 ft 0 in (1.83 m)	Jr	Kalamazoo HS	Kalamazoo, MI
F	44	Isadora Sousa	6 ft 0 in (1.83 m)	GS	Colegio A-Escopo; Chipola College	São Paulo, Brazil

Head coach

- Natasha Adair (South Florida)

Assistant coach(es)

- Darrell Mosley (Lincoln (PA))
- Mykala Walker (Wake Forest)
- Camille Collier (Wake Forest)

Legend

- (C) Team captain
- (S) Suspended
- (I) Ineligible
- (W) Walk-on
- Injured
- Current redshirt

Roster

== Schedule and results ==
Date time, TV	Rank^{#}	Opponent^{#}	Result	Record	High points	High rebounds	High assists	Site (attendance) city, state
Regular season
November 6, 2023*; 6:00 p.m.		UTSA	W 70–55	1–0	17 – Simmons	5 – Besselink	4 – Simmons	Desert Financial Arena (821); Tempe, AZ
November 10, 2023*; 6:00 p.m.		Montana State	W 75–62	2–0	17 – Tied	12 – Thompson	4 – Tied	Desert Financial Arena (1,521); Tempe, AZ
November 13, 2023*; 7:00 p.m.		San Francisco	W 77–69	3–0	22 – Toure	14 – Toure	4 – Tied	Desert Financial Arena (1,397); Tempe, AZ
November 16, 2023*; 5:00 p.m., ESPN+		at Grambling State; Pac-12/SWAC Legacy Series	L 67–70	3–1	18 – Tied	10 – Besselink	3 – Tied	Fredrick C. Hobdy Assembly Center (521); Grambling, LA
November 19, 2023*; 6:00 p.m.		Idaho State	W 72–40	4–1	17 – Crisp	7 – Tied	6 – Crisp	Desert Financial Arena (1,776); Tempe, AZ
November 23, 2023*; 6:00 p.m., ESPN+		vs. No. 12 Texas; Paradise Jam Reef Division	L 42–84	4–2	11 – Tied	5 – Besselink	1 – Tied	Sports and Fitness Center (1,224); Saint Thomas, USVI
November 24, 2023*; 3:45 p.m., ESPN+		vs. South Florida; Paradise Jam Reef Division	W 66–49	5–2	17 – Crisp	7 – Magolico	4 – Simmons	Sports and Fitness Center; Saint Thomas, USVI
November 25, 2023*; 3:45 p.m., ESPN+		vs. High Point; Paradise Jam Reef Division	W 77–69	6–2	20 – Brown	8 – Tied	4 – Crisp	Sports and Fitness Center; Saint Thomas, USVI
December 1, 2023*; 7:00 p.m., P12N		Pacific; Briann January Classic	W 76–66	7–2	26 – Simmons	8 – Thompson	4 – Crisp	Desert Financial Arena (1,808); Tempe, AZ
December 2, 2023*; 4:00 p.m.		Xavier; Briann January Classic	Canceled					Desert Financial Arena; Tempe, AZ
December 8, 2023*; 1:00 p.m.		Grand Canyon	L 59–66	7–3	20 – Simmons	8 – Toure	5 – Crisp	Desert Financial Arena (2,104); Tempe, AZ
December 17, 2023; 5:00 p.m., P12N		Arizona	L 52–91	7–4 (0–1)	19 – Brown	8 – Brown	1 – Tied	Desert Financial Arena (3,907); Tempe, AZ
December 20, 2023*; 12:00 p.m., ESPN+		vs. Fresno State; Jerry Colangelo Classic	W 80–76	8–4	22 – Toure	9 – Toure	8 – Simmons	Footprint Center; Phoenix, AZ
December 30, 2023*; 1:00 p.m.		Santa Clara	L 55–65	8–5	12 – Crisp	7 – Tied	3 – Crisp	Desert Financial Arena (1,586); Tempe, AZ
January 5, 2024; 7:00 p.m., P12N		No. 15 Utah	L 41–58	8–6 (0–2)	21 – Brown	7 – Tied	4 – Simmons	Desert Financial Arena (1,871); Tempe, AZ
January 7, 2024; 12:00 p.m., P12N		No. 5 Colorado	L 68–81	8–7 (0–3)	35 – Brown	5 – Tied	5 – Simmons	Desert Financial Arena (1,362); Tempe, AZ
January 12, 2024; 8:00 p.m., P12N		at Oregon	L 53–65	8–8 (0–4)	12 – Thompson	6 – Simmons	3 – Tied	Matthew Knight Arena (6,086); Eugene, OR
January 14, 2024; 1:00 p.m., P12N		at Oregon State	L 55–92	8–9 (0–5)	20 – Brown	5 – Thompson	1 – Tied	Gill Coliseum (1,042); Corvallis, OR
January 19, 2024; 8:00 p.m., P12N		at Washington State	L 64–79	8–10 (0–6)	21 – Brown	8 – Miller	7 – Simmons	Beasley Coliseum (1,042); Pullman, WA
January 21, 2024; 1:00 p.m., P12N		at Washington	W 73–65	9–10 (1–6)	34 – Brown	6 – Simmons	3 – Simmons	Alaska Airlines Arena (2,614); Seattle, WA
January 26, 2024; 6:00 p.m., P12N		No. 6 Stanford	L 50–80	9–11 (1–7)	17 – Brown	13 – Thompson	4 – Simmons	Desert Financial Arena (2,578); Tempe, AZ
January 28, 2024; 12:00 p.m., P12N		California	W 76–71	10–11 (2–7)	21 – Brown	8 – Thompson	3 – Tied	Desert Financial Arena (1,650); Tempe, AZ
February 4, 2024; 12:00 p.m., P12N		at Arizona	L 52–63	10–12 (2–8)	15 – Crisp	7 – Sousa	3 – Tied	McKale Center (8,210); Tucson, AZ
February 9, 2024; 8:00 p.m., P12N		at No. 10 USC	L 63–81	10–13 (2–9)	24 – Brown	8 – Thompson	5 – Crisp	Galen Center (3,128); Los Angeles, CA
February 11, 2024; 1:00 p.m., P12N		at No. 9 UCLA	L 45–78	10–14 (2–10)	25 – Brown	9 – Thompson	4 – Simmons	Pauley Pavilion (3,182); Los Angeles, CA
February 16, 2024; 6:00 p.m., P12N		Washington	W 73–66 ^{2OT}	11–14 (3–10)	23 – Crisp	10 – Miller	4 – Simmons	Desert Financial Arena (1,937); Tempe, AZ
February 18, 2024; 12:00 p.m., P12N		Washington State	L 46–73	11–15 (3–11)	14 – Crisp	7 – Tied	4 – Simmons	Desert Financial Arena (2,021); Tempe, AZ
February 23, 2024; 8:00 p.m., P12N		at California	L 55–67	11–16 (3–12)	18 – Brown	8 – Toure	5 – Simmons	Haas Pavilion (1,872); Berkeley, CA
February 25, 2024; 1:00 p.m., P12N		at No. 3 Stanford	L 67–81	11–17 (3–13)	18 – Brown	5 – Brown	4 – Simmons	Maples Pavilion (4,271); Stanford, CA
February 29, 2024; 7:00 p.m., P12N		No. 8 UCLA	L 41–70	11–18 (3–14)	14 – Brown	5 – Tied	3 – Tied	Desert Financial Arena (1,871); Tempe, AZ
March 2, 2024; 12:00 p.m., P12N		No. 7 USC	L 55–70	11–19 (3–15)	17 – Brown	8 – Sousa	2 – Tied	Desert Financial Arena (2,739); Tempe, AZ
Pac-12 Tournament
March 6, 2024; 9:30 p.m., P12N	(11)	vs. (6) No. 22 Utah; First round	L 60–71	11–20	19 – Crisp	5 – Tied	4 – Simmons	MGM Grand Garden Arena (4,372); Paradise, NV
*Non-conference game. ^{#}Rankings from AP Poll. (#) Tournament seedings in parentheses. All times are in Mountain Time.

== Rankings ==
Ranking movements Legend: — = Not ranked
	Week																				
Poll	Pre	1	2	3	4	5	6	7	8	9	10	11	12	13	14	15	16	17	18	19	Final
AP	—	—*	—																		Not released
Coaches	—	—*	—																		

*The preseason and Week 1 polls were the same.
^Coaches did not release a Week 2 poll.

== See also ==
- 2023–24 Arizona State Sun Devils men's basketball team
