= 2023–24 Washington Huskies women's basketball team =

American college basketball season

2023–24 Washington Huskies women's basketball

Rainbow Wahine Showdown champions

WBIT, First Round
- Conference: Pac-12 Conference
- Record: 16–15 (6–12 Pac-12)
- Head coach: Tina Langley (3rd season)
- Assistant coaches: Katie Faulkner; Latara King; Nolan Wilson; Robby Wilson
- Home arena: Alaska Airlines Arena

2023–24 Pac-12 Conference women's basketball standings
	Conf.				Overall
Team	W		L	PCT	W		L	PCT
No. 9 Stanford	15	–	3	.833	30	–	6	.833
No. 5 USC †	13	–	5	.722	29	–	6	.829
No. 10 UCLA	13	–	5	.722	27	–	7	.794
No. 8 Oregon State	12	–	6	.667	27	–	8	.771
No. 15 Colorado	11	–	7	.611	24	–	10	.706
No. 22 Utah	11	–	7	.611	23	–	11	.676
Arizona	8	–	10	.444	18	–	16	.529
California	7	–	11	.389	19	–	15	.559
Washington State	7	–	11	.389	21	–	15	.583
Washington	6	–	12	.333	16	–	15	.516
Arizona State	3	–	15	.167	11	–	20	.355
Oregon	2	–	16	.111	11	–	21	.344
† 2024 Pac-12 tournament winner Rankings from AP Poll

The 2023–24 Washington Huskies women's basketball team represented the University of Washington during the 2023–24 NCAA Division I women's basketball season. The Huskies, led by third-year head coach Tina Langley, played their home games at Alaska Airlines Arena at Hec Edmundson Pavilion in Seattle, Washington and competed as members of the Pac-12 Conference.

This was the last season that Washington played in the Pac-12 Conference before moving to the Big Ten Conference on August 1, 2024.

== Previous season ==
The Huskies finished the 2022–23 season 19–15, 7–11 in Pac-12 play to finish in a tie for eighth place. As the No. 8 seed in the Pac-12 tournament, they lost in the first round to Oregon. They were invited to the WNIT, where they defeated San Francisco in the first round, New Mexico in the second round, Kansas State in the Super 16, and Pac-12 member Oregon in the Great 8, before losing to Kansas in the Fab 4.

== Offseason ==
=== Departures ===
Washington departures
Name	Num	Pos.	Height	Year	Hometown	Reason for departure
Haley Van Dyke	11	F	6'1"	Senior	Walnut Creek, CA	Graduated
Emma Grothaus	21	C	6'4"	Senior	Mahtomedi, MN	Graduated
T.T. Watkins	25	G	5'11"	Senior	Walnut, CA	Graduated
Trinity Oliver	33	G	5'9"	Senior	Euless, TX	Graduated
Alexis Griggsby	35	G	5'9"	Senior	Northridge, CA	Graduate transferred to Pepperdine
Darcy Rees	53	C	6'4"	Senior	Adelaide, Australia	Graduated

==== Recruiting ====
College recruiting
Name	Hometown	School	Height	Weight	Commit date
Sayvia Sellers; PG	Anchorage, AK	Anchorage Christian	5 ft 7 in (1.70 m)	N/A	
Sayvia Sellers; PG	Recruit ratings: ESPN: (95)				
Ari Long; PG	Moreno Valley, CA	Valley View High School	6 ft 0 in (1.83 m)	N/A	
Ari Long; PG	Recruit ratings: ESPN: (94)				
Chloe Briggs; G	Ontario, CA	Ontario Christian School	5 ft 10 in (1.78 m)	N/A	
Chloe Briggs; G	Recruit ratings: ESPN: (92)				
Overall recruit ranking:
Note: In many cases, Scout, Rivals, 247Sports, On3, and ESPN may conflict in their listings of height and weight.; In these cases, the average was taken. ESPN grades are on a 100-point scale.; Sources: "2023 Player Commits". ESPN. Archived from the original on November 10, 2023.

==== Recruiting class of 2024 ====
College recruiting (2024)
Name	Hometown	School	Height	Weight	Commit date
Devin Coppinger; G	Everson, WA	Nooksack Valley	5 ft 10 in (1.78 m)	N/A	
Devin Coppinger; G	Recruit ratings: ESPN: (95)				
Overall recruit ranking:
Note: In many cases, Scout, Rivals, 247Sports, On3, and ESPN may conflict in their listings of height and weight.; In these cases, the average was taken. ESPN grades are on a 100-point scale.; Sources: "2024 Player Commits". ESPN. Archived from the original on November 10, 2023.

== Roster ==
2023–24 Washington Huskies women's basketball team
Players
Coaches

Pos.	#	Name	Height	Year	Previous school	Hometown
G	0	Sayvia Sellers	5 ft 7 in (1.7 m)	Fr	Anchorage Christian School	Anchorage, AK
G	1	Hannah Stines	5 ft 11 in (1.8 m)	So	Orangewood Academy	La Mirada, CA
F	2	Lauren Schwartz	5 ft 11 in (1.8 m)	Sr	Larry A. Ryle; Rice	Union, KY
G	3	Jayda Noble	5 ft 11 in (1.8 m)	Jr	Mount Spokane	Spokane, WA
G	5	Teagan Brown	5 ft 10 in (1.78 m)	So	Oak Ridge	Sacramento, CA
G	11	Chloe Briggs	5 ft 11 in (1.8 m)	Fr	Ontario Christian High School	Ontario, CA
G	13	Ari Long	6 ft 0 in (1.83 m)	Fr	Valley View	Moreno Valley, CA
F	14	Dalayah Daniels	6 ft 4 in (1.93 m)	Sr	Garfield; California	Seattle, WA
G	15	Nia Lowery	5 ft 11 in (1.8 m)	RS Sr	C. K. McClatchy	Sacramento, CA
F	22	Shayla Gillmer (W)	6 ft 1 in (1.85 m)	So	Ontario Christian	San Clemete, CA
F	23	Oliva Anderson (W)	6 ft 6 in (1.98 m)	Fr	Ellensburg	Ellensburg, WA
G	24	Elle Ladine	5 ft 11 in (1.8 m)	So	Pinewood	San Francisco, CA

Head coach

- Tina Langley (West Alabama)

Assistant coach(es)

- Katie Faulkner (Montana)
- Latara King (Florida Memorial)
- Nolan Wilson (Prairie View A&M)
- Robby Wilson (Arizona Christian)

Legend

- (C) Team captain
- (S) Suspended
- (I) Ineligible
- (W) Walk-on
- Injured
- Current redshirt

Roster

== Schedule and results ==
Date time, TV	Rank^{#}	Opponent^{#}	Result	Record	High points	High rebounds	High assists	Site (attendance) city, state
Exhibition
October 30, 2023*; 7:00 p.m.		Seattle Pacific	W 86–26		–	–	–	Alaska Airlines Arena; Seattle, WA
Regular season
November 6, 2023*; 5:30 p.m.		Sacramento State	W 76–28	1–0	20 – Ladine	8 – Gillmer	4 – Stines	Alaska Airlines Arena (1,864); Seattle, WA
November 9, 2023*; 5:00 p.m.		North Carolina Central	W 113–39	2–0	18 – Tied	11 – Daniels	7 – Sellers	Alaska Airlines Arena (1,481); Seattle, WA
November 15, 2023*; 7:00 p.m.		Pacific	W 81–64	3–0	17 – Daniels	8 – Ladine	5 – Sellers	Alaska Airlines Arena (1,420); Seattle, WA
November 18, 2023*; 1:00 p.m.		Seattle	W 80–64	4–0	18 – Ladine	12 – Ladine	3 – Stines	Alaska Airlines Arena (2,560); Seattle, WA
November 24, 2023*; 2:00 p.m.		vs. Idaho State; Rainbow Wahine Showdown	W 57–37	5–0	13 – Schwartz	6 – Daniels	3 – Stines	Stan Sheriff Center (250); Honolulu, HI
November 25, 2023*; 2:00 p.m.		vs. Air Force; Rainbow Wahine Showdown	W 73–53	6–0	19 – Schwartz	7 – Tied	5 – Stines	Stan Sheriff Center; Honolulu, HI
November 26, 2023*; 7:00 p.m., ESPN+		at Hawaii; Rainbow Wahine Showdown	W 57–41	7–0	19 – Daniels	9 – Daniels	4 – Stines	Stan Sheriff Center (1,780); Honolulu, HI
December 2, 2023*; 1:00 p.m.		San Francisco	W 63–39	8–0	16 – Ladine	10 – Ladine	3 – Tied	Alaska Airlines Arena (2,011); Seattle, WA
December 5, 2023*; 5:00 p.m.		Montana State	W 55–50	9–0	15 – Daniels	11 – Stines	3 – Schwartz	Alaska Airlines Arena (1,653); Seattle, WA
December 10, 2023; 1:00 p.m., P12N		at No. 21 Washington State	W 60–55	10–0 (1–0)	21 – Stines	9 – Stines	3 – Briggs	Beasley Coliseum (1,455); Pullman, WA
December 16, 2023*; 1:00 p.m., P12N		Saint Mary's	W 64–32	11–0	14 – Tied	8 – Tied	4 – Schwartz	Alaska Airlines Arena (2,490); Seattle, WA
December 20, 2023*; 4:00 p.m., ACCN	No. 23	at No. 19 Louisville	L 51–59	11–1	13 – Schwartz	10 – Daniels	3 – Tied	KFC Yum! Center (8,018); Louisville, KY
January 5, 2024; 7:00 p.m., P12N		at California	L 57–70	11–2 (1–1)	24 – Ladine	7 – Daniels	4 – Daniels	Haas Pavilion (1,207); Berkeley, CA
January 7, 2024; 1:00 p.m., P12N		at No. 8 Stanford	L 59–71	11–3 (1–2)	15 – Daniels	6 – Stines	4 – Schwartz	Maples Pavilion (3,924); Stanford, CA
January 14, 2024; 12:00 p.m., P12N		Washington State	L 59–72	11–4 (1–3)	23 – Daniels	8 – Daniels	3 – Tied	Alaska Airlines Arena (4,104); Seattle, WA
January 19, 2024; 7:00 p.m., P12N		Arizona	W 62–60	12–4 (2–3)	22 – Ladine	9 – Noble	5 – Daniels	Alaska Airlines Arena (2,090); Seattle, WA
January 21, 2024; 12:00 p.m., P12N		Arizona State	L 65–73	12–5 (2–4)	20 – Stines	12 – Daniels	2 – Tied	Alaska Airlines Arena (2,614); Seattle, WA
January 26, 2024; 7:00 p.m., P12N		at No. 2 UCLA	L 44–62	12–6 (2–5)	14 – Daniels	7 – Tied	4 – Stines	Pauley Pavilion (3,563); Los Angeles, CA
January 28, 2024; 12:00 p.m., P12N		at No. 11 USC	W 62–59	13–6 (3–5)	21 – Schwartz	13 – Daniels	3 – Tied	Galen Center (3,416); Los Angeles, CA
February 2, 2024; 7:00 p.m., P12N		No. 20 Utah	L 65–83	13–7 (3–6)	24 – Stines	8 – Daniels	4 – Schwartz	Alaska Airlines Arena (3,413); Seattle, WA
February 4, 2024; 12:00 p.m., P12N		No. 6 Colorado	L 57–80	13–8 (3–7)	14 – Daniels	5 – Daniels	2 – Tied	Alaska Airlines Arena (4,900); Seattle, WA
February 9, 2024; 7:00 p.m., P12N		No. 6 Stanford	L 59–63 ^{OT}	13–9 (3–8)	17 – Stines	9 – Daniels	4 – Daniels	Alaska Airlines Arena (4,454); Seattle, WA
February 11, 2024; 12:00 p.m., P12N		California	L 57–59	13–10 (3–9)	13 – Daniels	5 – Tied	3 – Stines	Alaska Airlines Arena (2,773); Seattle, WA
February 16, 2024; 5:00 p.m., P12N		at Arizona State	L 66–73 ^{2OT}	13–11 (3–10)	18 – Schwartz	15 – Noble	7 – Schwartz	Desert Financial Arena (1,937); Tempe, AZ
February 18, 2024; 11:00 a.m., P12N		at Arizona	L 82–90 ^{3OT}	13–12 (3–11)	27 – Schwartz	6 – Stines	6 – Stines	McKale Center (7,354); Tucson, AZ
February 23, 2024; 7:00 p.m., P12N		Oregon	W 74–66	14–12 (4–11)	17 – Schwartz	8 – Daniels	10 – Sellers	Alaska Airlines Arena (2,840); Seattle, WA
February 25, 2024; 12:00 p.m., P12N		No. 9 Oregon State	W 61–51	15–12 (5–11)	23 – Ladine	8 – Stines	3 – Stines	Alaska Airlines Arena (3,284); Seattle, WA
February 29, 2024; 6:00 p.m., P12N		at No. 13 Colorado	L 62–68	15–13 (5–12)	18 – Schwartz	8 – Daniels	2 – Tied	CU Events Center (4,203); Boulder, CO
March 2, 2024; 11:00 a.m., P12N		at No. 18 Utah	W 62–47	16–13 (6–12)	18 – Schwartz	9 – Daniels	4 – Schwartz	Jon M. Huntsman Center (5,969); Salt Lake City, UT
Pac-12 Women's Tournament
March 6, 2024; 6:00 p.m., P12N	(10)	vs. (7) Arizona; First Round	L 50–58	16–14	13 – Daniels	10 – Daniels	2 – Tied	MGM Grand Garden Arena; Paradise, NV
WBIT
March 21, 2024; 7:00 p.m., ESPN+	(2)	Georgetown; First Round	L 56–64	16–15	15 – Sellers	10 – Daniels	4 – Schwartz	Alaska Airlines Arena (699); Seattle, WA
*Non-conference game. ^{#}Rankings from AP Poll. (#) Tournament seedings in parentheses. All times are in Pacific Time.

== Rankings ==
Ranking movements Legend: ██ Increase in ranking ██ Decrease in ranking — = Not ranked RV = Received votes
	Week																				
Poll	Pre	1	2	3	4	5	6	7	8	9	10	11	12	13	14	15	16	17	18	19	Final
AP	RV	—	—	—	—	RV	23	RV	RV	RV	—	—	RV	—	—	—	—	—	—	—	Not released
Coaches	—	—	—	—	—	RV	23	24	24	RV	—	—	—	—	—	—	—	—	—	—	

== See also ==
- 2023–24 Washington Huskies men's basketball team
