= 2023–24 Oregon State Beavers women's basketball team =

American college basketball season

2023–24 Oregon State Beavers women's basketball

NCAA tournament, Elite Eight
- Conference: Pac-12 Conference

Ranking
- Coaches: No. 10
- AP: No. 8
- Record: 27–8 (12–6 Pac-12)
- Head coach: Scott Rueck (14th season)
- Associate head coach: Jonas Chatterton
- Assistant coaches: Deven Hunter; Aleah Goodman
- Home arena: Gill Coliseum

2023–24 Pac-12 Conference women's basketball standings
	Conf.				Overall
Team	W		L	PCT	W		L	PCT
No. 9 Stanford	15	–	3	.833	30	–	6	.833
No. 5 USC †	13	–	5	.722	29	–	6	.829
No. 10 UCLA	13	–	5	.722	27	–	7	.794
No. 8 Oregon State	12	–	6	.667	27	–	8	.771
No. 15 Colorado	11	–	7	.611	24	–	10	.706
No. 22 Utah	11	–	7	.611	23	–	11	.676
Arizona	8	–	10	.444	18	–	16	.529
California	7	–	11	.389	19	–	15	.559
Washington State	7	–	11	.389	21	–	15	.583
Washington	6	–	12	.333	16	–	15	.516
Arizona State	3	–	15	.167	11	–	20	.355
Oregon	2	–	16	.111	11	–	21	.344
† 2024 Pac-12 tournament winner Rankings from AP Poll

The 2023–24 Oregon State Beavers women's basketball team represented Oregon State University during the 2023–24 NCAA Division I women's basketball season. The Beavers were led by fourteenth-year head coach Scott Rueck, and they played their games at Gill Coliseum as members of the Pac-12 Conference. This was their final season as Pac-12 member as they will join West Coast Conference as affiliate member for the next two years.

== Previous season ==
The Beavers finished the 2022–23 season 13–18, 4–14 in Pac-12 play to finish in tenth place. As the No. 10 seed in the Pac-12 tournament, they defeated USC in the first round before losing to Colorado in the quarterfinals.

== Offseason ==
=== Departures ===
Oregon State Departures
Name	Num	Pos.	Height	Year	Hometown	Reason for Departure
Shalexxus Aaron	0	G	6'1"	(redshirt) Junior	Apple Valley, CA	Transferred to Houston
Bendu Yeaney	1	G	5'10"	(redshirt) Senior	Portland, OR	Graduated
Noelle Mannen	4	G	5'6"	(redshirt) senior	North Plains, OR	Walk-on; Graduated
Jelena Mitrović	12	F/C	6'9"	(redshirt) Senior	Novi Sad, Serbia	Graduated

=== Incoming ===
Oregon State incoming transfers
Name	Num	Pos.	Height	Year	Hometown	Previous School
Susana Yepes	10	F	6'0"	Junior	Medellín, Colombia	South Georgia Tech
Sela Heide	32	C	6'7"	Junior	North Bend, WA	California
Kelsey Rees	53	F	6'5"	Junior	Glenelg, Australia	Utah

==== Recruiting ====
College recruiting information
Name	Hometown	School	Height	Weight	Commit date
Donovyn Hunter; G	Medford, OR	South Medford High School	5 ft 11 in (1.80 m)	N/A	
Donovyn Hunter; G	Recruit ratings: ESPN: (93)				
Overall recruit ranking:
Note: In many cases, Scout, Rivals, 247Sports, On3, and ESPN may conflict in their listings of height and weight.; In these cases, the average was taken. ESPN grades are on a 100-point scale.; Sources: "2023 Player Commits". ESPN. Archived from the original on November 27, 2023.

== Roster ==
2023–24 Oregon State Beavers women's basketball team
Players
Coaches

Pos.	#	Name	Height	Year	Previous school	Hometown
G	1	Kennedie Shuler	5 ft 10 in (1.78 m)	Fr	Barlow HS	Gresham, OR
G	2	Lily Hansford	6 ft 2 in (1.88 m)	So	Appleton East HS	DePere, WI
G	3	Dominika Paurová	6 ft 1 in (1.85 m)	Fr	DME Academy	Mladá Boleslav, Czech Republic
G	4	Donovyn Hunter	6 ft 0 in (1.83 m)	Fr	South Medford HS	Medford, OR
F	10	Susana Yepes	6 ft 0 in (1.83 m)	Jr	South Georgia Tech	Medellín, Colombia
G	11	AJ Marotte	6 ft 1 in (1.85 m)	Jr	Vista Ridge HS	Cedar Park, TX
F	15	Raegan Beers	6 ft 4 in (1.93 m)	So	Valor Christian HS	Littleton, CO
G	22	Talia von Oelhoffen	5 ft 11 in (1.8 m)	Jr	Chiawana HS	Pasco, WA
G	24	Adlee Blacklock	6 ft 0 in (1.83 m)	So	Lubbock-Cooper HS	Lubbock, TX
F	30	Timea Gardiner	6 ft 3 in (1.91 m)	So	Fremont HS	Ogden, UT
G	31	Martha Pietsch	5 ft 5 in (1.65 m)	So		Berlin, Germany
C	32	Sela Heide	6 ft 7 in (2.01 m)	Jr	Mount Si HS; California	North Bend, WA
F	53	Kelsey Rees	6 ft 5 in (1.96 m)	Jr	BA Centre of Excellence; Utah	Glenelg, Australia

Head coach

- Scott Rueck (Oregon State)

Assistant coach(es)

- Jonas Chatterton (Utah)
- Jenny Huth (Colorado)
- Aleah Goodman (Oregon State)

Legend

- (C) Team captain
- (S) Suspended
- (I) Ineligible
- (W) Walk-on
- Injured
- Current redshirt

Roster

== Schedule and results ==
Date time, TV	Rank^{#}	Opponent^{#}	Result	Record	High points	High rebounds	High assists	Site (attendance) city, state
Exhibition
October 29, 2023*; 1:30 p.m.		Western Washington	W 80–43		17 – Beers	6 – Beers	6 – von Oelhoffen	Gill Coliseum (2,203); Corvallis, OR
Non-conference regular season
November 6, 2023*; 5:30 p.m.		Arkansas–Pine Bluff	W 85–74	1–0	19 – Beers	14 – Beers	6 – Hunter	Gill Coliseum (3,305); Corvallis, OR
November 12, 2023*; 1:00 p.m., P12N		Villanova	W 63–56	2–0	20 – Beers	14 – Beers	4 – von Oelhoffen	Gill Coliseum (3,775); Corvallis, OR
November 17, 2023*; 6:00 p.m.		UC Davis	W 86–48	3–0	16 – Beers	13 – Gardiner	6 – von Oelhoffen	Gill Coliseum (3,836); Corvallis, OR
November 22, 2023*; 6:00 p.m.		UMBC	W 88–52	4–0	27 – Beers	16 – Beers	8 – von Oelhoffen	Gill Coliseum (3,414); Corvallis, OR
November 29, 2023*; 11:00 a.m.		Weber State	W 79–53	5–0	24 – Beers	12 – Beers	5 – Hunter	Gill Coliseum (8,454); Corvallis, OR
December 2, 2023*; 2:00 p.m.		Western Kentucky	W 76–52	6–0	23 – Marotte	13 – Beers	7 – von Oelhoffen	Gill Coliseum (3,528); Corvallis, OR
December 9, 2023*; 6:00 p.m.		Jackson State	W 78–58	7–0	15 – Tied	15 – Gardiner	5 – von Oelhoffen	Gill Coliseum (3,583); Corvallis, OR
December 15, 2023*; 6:00 p.m.		Santa Clara	W 80–52	8–0	19 – Beers	10 – Beers	7 – von Oelhoffen	Gill Coliseum (3,522); Corvallis, OR
December 19, 2023*; 9:30 p.m., YouTube		vs. Southeastern Louisiana; Maui Classic	W 92–69	9–0	19 – Beers	9 – Beers	6 – von Oelhoffen	Seabury Hall (882); Makawao, HI
December 20, 2023*; 9:30 p.m., Youtube		vs. Texas Tech; Maui Classic	W 77–65	10–0	20 – von Oelhoffen	12 – Beers	11 – von Oelhoffen	Seabury Hall (1,100); Makawao, HI
December 28, 2023*; 2:00 p.m.		Morgan State	W 80–51	11–0	24 – Beers	8 – Beers	7 – Paurova	Gill Coliseum (3,561); Corvallis, OR
Pac-12 regular season
December 31, 2023; 2:00 p.m., P12N		Oregon; Rivalry	W 62–41	12–0 (1–0)	24 – Beers	17 – Beers	8 – Von Oelhoffen	Gill Coliseum (5,929); Corvallis, OR
January 5, 2024; 7:00 p.m., P12N		at No. 9 USC	L 54–56	12–1 (1–1)	18 – von Oelhoffen	10 – Gardiner	6 – von Oelhoffen	Galen Center (2,749); Los Angeles, CA
January 7, 2024; 1:00 p.m., P12N		at No. 2 UCLA	L 54–65	12–2 (1–2)	21 – Beers	5 – Beers	3 – Tied	Pauley Pavilion (3,623); Los Angeles, CA
January 12, 2024; 7:00 p.m., P12N		Arizona	W 73–70 ^{2OT}	13–2 (2–2)	20 – Beers	20 – Beers	4 – von Oelhoffen	Gill Coliseum (4,497); Corvallis, OR
January 14, 2024; Noon, P12N		Arizona State	W 92–55	14–2 (3–2)	27 – Beers	15 – Beers	9 – von Oelhoffen	Gill Coliseum (N/A); Corvallis, OR
January 19, 2024; 7:00 p.m., P12N		at California	W 71–64	15–2 (4–2)	19 – Beers	7 – Beers	5 – Tied	Haas Pavilion (1,382); Berkeley, CA
January 21, 2024; 2:00 p.m., P12N		at No. 8 Stanford	L 56–65	15–3 (4–3)	18 – Beers	10 – Beers	4 – Beers	Maples Pavilion (7,022); Stanford, CA
January 26, 2024; 7:00 p.m., P12N	No. 25	No. 3 Colorado	W 68–62	16–3 (5–3)	16 – Tied	9 – Beers	4 – Tied	Gill Coliseum (5,262); Corvallis, OR
January 28, 2024; Noon, P12N	No. 25	No. 16 Utah	W 91–66	17–3 (6–3)	20 – Beers	11 – Gardiner	10 – Hunter	Gill Coliseum (5,024); Corvallis, OR
February 4, 2024; 4:00 p.m., P12N	No. 18	at Oregon; Rivalry	W 64–60	18–3 (7–3)	19 – Gardiner	16 – Beers	7 – von Oelhoffen	Matthew Knight Arena (8,602); Eugene, OR
February 9, 2024; 6:00 p.m., P12N	No. 17	at No. 20 Utah	W 58–44	19–3 (8–3)	17 – Beers	8 – Beers	4 – Hunter	Jon M. Huntsman Center (6,288); Salt Lake City, UT
February 11, 2024; 11:00 a.m., P12N	No. 17	at No. 4 Colorado	W 65–59	20–3 (9–3)	18 – von Oelhoffen	12 – Beers	4 – Tied	CU Events Center (6,740); Boulder, CO
February 16, 2024; 7:00 p.m., P12N	No. 11	No. 9 UCLA	W 79–77	21–3 (10–3)	22 – von Oelhoffen	5 – Tied	2 – Tied	Gill Coliseum (8,525); Corvallis, OR
February 18, 2024; Noon, P12N	No. 11	No. 10 USC	L 50–58	21–4 (10–4)	22 – Gardiner	9 – Gardiner	10 – von Oelhoffen	Gill Coliseum (8,210); Corvallis, OR
February 23, 2024; 7:00 p.m., P12N	No. 9	at Washington State	W 65–52	22–4 (11–4)	11 – Hansford	9 – Rees	3 – multiple	Beasley Coliseum (1,853); Pullman, WA
February 25, 2024; Noon, P12N	No. 9	at Washington	L 51–61	22–5 (11–5)	13 – Gardiner	11 – Gardiner	4 – Hunter	Alaska Airlines Arena (3,284); Seattle, WA
February 29, 2024; 7:00 p.m., P12N	No. 11	No. 4 Stanford	L 63–67	22–6 (11–6)	27 – von Oelhoffen	6 – Heide	4 – von Oelhoffen	Gill Coliseum (7,867); Corvallis, OR
March 2, 2024; Noon, P12N	No. 11	California	W 79–58	23–6 (12–6)	19 – Gardiner	8 – Gardiner	9 – Hunter	Gill Coliseum (6,377); Corvallis, OR
Pac-12 Women's Tournament
March 7, 2024; Noon, P12N	(4) No. 13	vs. (5) No. 18 Colorado; Quarterfinals	W 85–79 ^{20T}	24–6	27 – Beers	13 – Beers	9 – Hunter	MGM Grand Garden Arena (4,883); Paradise, NV
March 8, 2024; 5:00 p.m., P12N	(4) No. 13	vs. (1) No. 2 Stanford; Semifinals	L 57–66	24–7	17 – Beers	7 – Tied	6 – Paurova	MGM Grand Garden Arena (5,713); Paradise, NV
NCAA Women's Tournament
March 22, 2024*; 5:00 p.m., ESPNU	(3 A1) No. 12	(14 A1) Eastern Washington; First round	W 73–51	25–7	19 – Beers	9 – Beers	6 – von Oelhoffen	Gill Coliseum (6,923); Corvallis, OR
March 24, 2024*; 1:00 p.m., ESPN	(3 A1) No. 12	(6 A1) Nebraska; Second round	W 61–51	26–7	19 – von Oelhoffen	7 – Gardiner	8 – von Oelhoffen	Gill Coliseum (7,227); Corvallis, OR
March 29, 2024*; 11:30 a.m., ESPN	(3 A1) No. 12	vs. (2 P4) No. 9 Notre Dame; Sweet Sixteen	W 70–65	27–7	23 – Gardiner	13 – Beers	9 – von Oelhoffen	MVP Arena (13,597); Albany, NY
March 31, 2024*; 10:00 a.m., ABC	(3 A1) No. 12	vs. (1 P4) No. 1 South Carolina; Elite Eight	L 58–70	27–8	16 – Beers	12 – Gardiner	5 – Tied	MVP Arena (13,568); Albany, NY
*Non-conference game. ^{#}Rankings from AP Poll. (#) Tournament seedings in parentheses. A1=Albany 1. All times are in Pacific Time.

== Rankings ==
Ranking movements Legend: ██ Increase in ranking ██ Decrease in ranking — = Not ranked RV = Received votes
	Week																				
Poll	Pre	1	2	3	4	5	6	7	8	9	10	11	12	13	14	15	16	17	18	19	Final
AP	—	—	—	—	—	—	RV	RV	RV	RV	RV	25	18	17	11	9	11	13	12	12	8
Coaches	—	—	—	—	—	—	—	—	RV	RV	RV	25	19	19	15	14	16	15	14	15	10

== See also ==
- 2023–24 Oregon State Beavers men's basketball team
