= 2023–24 Oregon Ducks women's basketball team =

Intercollegiate basketball season

2023–24 Oregon Ducks women's basketball
- Conference: Pac-12 Conference
- Record: 11–21 (2–16 Pac-12)
- Head coach: Kelly Graves (10th season)
- Associate head coach: Jodie Berry
- Assistant coaches: Jackie Nared Hairston; Tre Simmons
- Home arena: Matthew Knight Arena

2023–24 Pac-12 Conference women's basketball standings
	Conf.				Overall
Team	W		L	PCT	W		L	PCT
No. 9 Stanford	15	–	3	.833	30	–	6	.833
No. 5 USC †	13	–	5	.722	29	–	6	.829
No. 10 UCLA	13	–	5	.722	27	–	7	.794
No. 8 Oregon State	12	–	6	.667	27	–	8	.771
No. 15 Colorado	11	–	7	.611	24	–	10	.706
No. 22 Utah	11	–	7	.611	23	–	11	.676
Arizona	8	–	10	.444	18	–	16	.529
California	7	–	11	.389	19	–	15	.559
Washington State	7	–	11	.389	21	–	15	.583
Washington	6	–	12	.333	16	–	15	.516
Arizona State	3	–	15	.167	11	–	20	.355
Oregon	2	–	16	.111	11	–	21	.344
† 2024 Pac-12 tournament winner Rankings from AP Poll

The 2023–24 Oregon Ducks women's basketball team represented the University of Oregon during the 2023–24 NCAA Division I women's basketball season. The Ducks were led by tenth-year head coach Kelly Graves, and they played their home games at Matthew Knight Arena as members of the Pac-12 Conference. They finished the season at 11–21, 2–16 in Pac-12 play to finish in a last place. They lost in the first round of the Pac-12 Tournament to Colorado. They missed the postseason for the first time since 2015.

This was also the last season for Oregon played in the Pac-12 Conference before moving to the Big Ten Conference on August 1, 2024.

== Previous season ==
The Ducks finished the season at 20–15 and 7–11 in Pac-12 play to finish in a tie for eighth place. They defeated Washington in the first round of the Pac-12 Tournament before losing in the quarterfinals to Stanford. They received invitation of the WNIT where they defeated North Dakota State in the first round, Rice in the second round and San Diego in the Super 16 before losing to Pac-12 member Washington.

== Offseason ==
=== Departures ===
Due to COVID-19 disruptions throughout NCAA sports in 2020–21, the NCAA announced that the 2020–21 season would not count against the athletic eligibility of any individual involved in an NCAA winter sport, including women's basketball. This meant that all seniors in 2020–21 had the option to return for 2021–22.

Name	Number	Pos.	Height	Year	Hometown	Reason left
Taya Hanson	0	G	5'10"	Senior	Kelowna, BC	Graduated
Ahlist Hurst	3	G	5'9"	GS Senior	Bendigo, Australia	Graduated
Endyia Rogers	4	G	5'7"	Senior	Dallas, TX	Graduate transferred to Texas A&M
Taylor Hosendove	11	F	6'2"	GS Senior	Atlanta, GA	Graduated
Te-Hina Paopao	12	F	5'9"	Junior	Oceanside, CA	Transferred to South Carolina
Sedona Prince	32	F	6'7"	RS Senior	Liberty Hill, TX	Graduate transferred to TCU

=== Incoming transfers ===
Name	Number	Pos.	Height	Year	Hometown	Previous school
Ula Chamberlin	0	G	5'8"	Senior	Medford, OR	UC Dan Diego
Priscilla Williams	4	G	6'2"	RS Sophomore	Branson, MO	South Florida
Peyton Scott	10	G	5'8"	GS Senior	Lynchburg, OH	Miami (OH)
Kennedi Williams	12	G	5'7"	RS Senior	Douglasville, GA	Liberty
Bella Hamel	21	G	5'9"	Junior	Hillsboro, OR	Lane Community College

==== Recruiting ====
College recruiting information
Name	Hometown	School	Height	Weight	Commit date
Sofia Bell; W	Portland, OR	Jesuit High School	6 ft 1 in (1.85 m)	N/A	
Sofia Bell; W	Recruit ratings: ESPN: (95)				
Sammie Wagner; W	San Antonio, TX	Ronald Reagan High School	6 ft 1 in (1.85 m)	N/A	
Sammie Wagner; W	Recruit ratings: ESPN: (94)				
Sarah Rambus; F	Bradenton, FL	IMG Academy	6 ft 3 in (1.91 m)	N/A	
Sarah Rambus; F	Recruit ratings: ESPN: (93)				
Overall recruit ranking:
Note: In many cases, Scout, Rivals, 247Sports, On3, and ESPN may conflict in their listings of height and weight.; In these cases, the average was taken. ESPN grades are on a 100-point scale.; Sources: "2023 Player Commits". ESPN. Archived from the original on November 12, 2023.

==== Recruiting class of 2024 ====
College recruiting information (2024)
Name	Hometown	School	Height	Weight	Commit date
Katie Fiso; PG	Seattle, WA	Garfield High School	5 ft 11 in (1.80 m)	N/A	
Katie Fiso; PG	Recruit ratings: ESPN: (95)				
Overall recruit ranking:
Note: In many cases, Scout, Rivals, 247Sports, On3, and ESPN may conflict in their listings of height and weight.; In these cases, the average was taken. ESPN grades are on a 100-point scale.; Sources: "2024 Player Commits". ESPN. Archived from the original on November 12, 2023.

== Roster ==
2023–24 Oregon Ducks women's basketball team
Players
Coaches

Pos.	#	Name	Height	Year	Previous school	Hometown
G	0	Ula Chamberlin	5 ft 8 in (1.73 m)	Sr	South Medford HS; UC San Diego	Medford, OR
F	1	Kennedy Basham	6 ft 7 in (2.01 m)	So	PHH Prep	Phoenix, AZ
G	2	Chance Gray	5 ft 9 in (1.75 m)	So	Winton Woods HS	Cincinnati, OH
G	3	Sofia Bell	6 ft 1 in (1.85 m)	Fr	Jesuit HS	Portland, OR
G	4	Priscilla Williams	6 ft 2 in (1.88 m)	RS So	Branson; South Florida	Branson, MO
G/F	11	Sammie Wagner	6 ft 1 in (1.85 m)	Fr	Ronald Reagan HS	San Antonio, TX
G	12	Kennedi Williams	5 ft 7 in (1.7 m)	RS Sr	Greater Atlanta Christian School; Liberty	Douglasville, GA
F	13	Filippa Tilliander	6 ft 1 in (1.85 m)	Fr	Norrköping Dolphins	Malmö, Sweden
C	15	Phillipina Kyei	6 ft 8 in (2.03 m)	Jr	Crestwood Prep	Calgary, AB
G	21	Bella Hamel	5 ft 9 in (1.75 m)	Jr	Liberty HS; Lane CC	Hillsboro, OR
F	23	Sarah Rambus	6 ft 3 in (1.91 m)	Fr	IMG Academy	Flint, MI
F	40	Grace VanSlooten	6 ft 3 in (1.91 m)	So	IMG Academy	Toledo, OH

Head coach

- Kelly Graves (New Mexico)

Assistant coach(es)

- Jodie Berry (Western Washington)
- Jackie Nared Hairston (Saint Mary's)
- Tre Simmons (Washington)

Legend

- (C) Team captain
- (S) Suspended
- (I) Ineligible
- (W) Walk-on
- Injured
- Current redshirt

Roster

== Schedule and results ==
Date time, TV	Rank^{#}	Opponent^{#}	Result	Record	High points	High rebounds	High assists	Site (attendance) city, state
Non-conference regular season
November 6, 2023*; 6:00 p.m.		Northern Arizona	W 81–48	1–0	19 – VanSlooten	11 – Kyei	4 – Tied	Matthew Knight Arena (5,430); Eugene, OR
November 8, 2023*; 6:00 p.m.		Arkansas–Pine Bluff	W 86–60	2–0	20 – Gray	11 – Tied	6 – VanSlooten	Matthew Knight Arena (5,020); Eugene, OR
November 16, 2023*; 6:00 p.m., ESPN+		at Grand Canyon	W 64–56	3–0	21 – VanSlooten	16 – Kyei	7 – Gray	Global Credit Union Arena (2,136); Phoenix, AZ
November 18, 2023*; 12:00 p.m.		Santa Clara	L 50–89	3–1	11 – Gray	6 – Tilliander	4 – Gray	Matthew Knight Arena (5,207); Eugene, OR
November 21, 2023*; 6:30 p.m., MW Network		at Nevada	W 76–47	4–1	17 – Tied	16 – VanSlooten	7 – Gray	Lawlor Events Center (2,193); Reno, NV
November 30, 2023*; 6:00 p.m., ESPN+		at Portland	L 60–91	4–2	15 – VanSlooten	16 – VanSlooten	3 – K. Williams	Chiles Center (1,325); Portland, OR
December 3, 2023*; 11:00 a.m., FS1		at No. 13 Baylor	L 51–71	4–3	15 – Kyei	12 – Kyei	3 – Tied	Ferrell Center (4,340); Waco, TX
December 8, 2023*; 7:00 p.m.		Idaho	W 59–51	5–3	20 – Gray	17 – Kyei	4 – VanSlooten	Matthew Knight Arena (5,153); Eugene, OR
December 9, 2023*; 2:00 p.m.		Portland State	W 65–54	6–3	20 – Kyei	18 – Kyei	8 – K. Williams	Matthew Knight Arena (5,324); Eugene, OR
December 11, 2023*; 7:00 p.m., P12N		Southern; Pac-12/SWAC Legacy Series	W 67–37	7–3	18 – Kyei	21 – Kyei	5 – Tied	Matthew Knight Arena (5,307); Eugene, OR
December 17, 2023*; 11:00 a.m., P12N+		UTSA	W 61–48	8–3	14 – Gray	10 – VanSlooten	5 – K. Williams	Matthew Knight Arena (5,549); Eugene, OR
December 19, 2023*; 1:00 p.m., ESPN+		at Utah Tech; Trailblazer Classic	L 86–92	8–4	25 – VanSlooten	9 – Tied	5 – Tied	Burns Arena (486); St. George, UT
December 21, 2023*; 1:00 p.m., ESPN+		vs. Oklahoma State; Trailblazer Classic	W 70–63	9–4	21 – Gray	7 – VanSlooten	8 – K. Williams	Burns Arena (301); St. George, UT
Pac-12 regular season
December 31, 2023; 2:00 p.m., P12N		at Oregon State; Rivalry	L 41–62	9–5 (0–1)	15 – VanSlooten	16 – Kyei	2 – Tied	Gill Coliseum (5,929); Corvallis, OR
January 5, 2024; 7:00 p.m., P12N		at No. 2 UCLA	L 49–75	9–6 (0–2)	14 – Kyei	7 – Kyei	3 – Kyei	Pauley Pavilion (3,415); Los Angeles, CA
January 7, 2024; 12:00 p.m., P12N		at No. 9 USC	L 54–68	9–7 (0–3)	18 – VanSlooten	11 – Kyei	5 – Kyei	Galen Center (2,282); Los Angeles, CA
January 12, 2024; 7:00 p.m., P12N		Arizona State	W 65–53	10–7 (1–3)	19 – Gray	14 – Kyei	4 – Gray	Matthew Knight Arena (6,086); Eugene, OR
January 14, 2024; 12:00 p.m., P12N		Arizona	W 70–68	11–7 (2–3)	19 – VanSlooten	12 – Kyei	5 – VanSlooten	Matthew Knight Arena (N/A); Eugene, OR
January 19, 2024; 7:00 p.m., P12N		at No. 8 Stanford	L 63–88	11–8 (2–4)	19 – Gray	7 – VanSlooten	5 – Gray	Maples Pavilion (4,556); Stanford, CA
January 21, 2024; 12:00 p.m., P12N		at California	L 57–66	11–9 (2–5)	17 – Kyei	14 – Kyei	6 – VanSlooten	Haas Pavilion (1,347); Berkeley, CA
January 26, 2024; 7:00 p.m., P12N		No. 16 Utah	L 48–58	11–10 (2–6)	19 – Kyei	16 – Kyei	3 – Basham	Matthew Knight Arena (6,965); Eugene, OR
January 28, 2024; 12:00 p.m., P12N		No. 3 Colorado	L 48–61	11–11 (2–7)	16 – VanSlooten	17 – Kyei	2 – VanSlooten	Matthew Knight Arena (2,517); Eugene, OR
February 4, 2024; 4:00 p.m., P12N		No. 18 Oregon State; Rivalry	L 60–64	11–12 (2–8)	16 – Kyei	18 – Kyei	4 – K. Williams	Matthew Knight Arena (8,602); Eugene, OR
February 9, 2024; 6:00 p.m., P12N		at No. 4 Colorado	L 56–90	11–13 (2–9)	16 – VanSlooten	8 – Kyei	3 – VanSlooten	CU Events Center (5,447); Boulder, CO
February 11, 2024; 11:00 a.m., P12N		at No. 20 Utah	L 48–70	11–14 (2–10)	15 – Kyei	12 – Kyei	4 – Tied	Jon M. Huntsman Center (4,762); Salt Lake City, UT
February 16, 2024; 7:00 p.m., P12N		No. 10 USC	L 51–88	11–15 (2–11)	12 – Gray	18 – Kyei	4 – VanSlooten	Matthew Knight Arena (7,145); Eugene, OR
February 18, 2024; 2:00 p.m., P12N		No. 9 UCLA	L 55–74	11–16 (2–12)	17 – VanSlooten	10 – VanSlooten	3 – Gray	Matthew Knight Arena (6,792); Eugene, OR
February 23, 2024; 7:00 p.m., P12N		at Washington	L 66–74	11–17 (2–13)	19 – VanSlooten	21 – Kyei	3 – VanSlooten	Alaska Airlines Arena (2,840); Seattle, WA
February 25, 2024; 12:00 p.m., P12N		at Washington State	L 61–71	11–18 (2–14)	23 – Kyei	15 – Kyei	5 – VanSlooten	Beasley Coliseum (1,331); Pullman, WA
February 29, 2024; 7:00 p.m., P12N		California	L 59–62	11–19 (2–15)	17 – Gray	11 – Tied	6 – Gray	Matthew Knight Arena (5,914); Eugene, OR
March 2, 2024; 2:00 p.m., P12N		No. 4 Stanford	L 56–76	11–20 (2–16)	18 – Gray	6 – Kyei	3 – Tied	Matthew Knight Arena (6,996); Eugene, OR
Pac-12 Women's Tournament
March 6, 2024; 12:00 p.m., P12N	(12)	vs. (5) No. 18 Colorado; First round	L 30–79	11–21	9 – VanSlooten	6 – Tied	2 – Kyei	MGM Grand Garden Arena; Paradise, NV
*Non-conference game. ^{#}Rankings from AP Poll. (#) Tournament seedings in parentheses. All times are in Pacific Time.

== Rankings ==
Ranking movements Legend: ██ Increase in ranking ██ Decrease in ranking — = Not ranked RV = Received votes
	Week																				
Poll	Pre	1	2	3	4	5	6	7	8	9	10	11	12	13	14	15	16	17	18	19	Final
AP	RV	RV*	—																		Not released
Coaches	RV	RV*	—																		

*The preseason and week 1 polls were the same.

== See also ==
- 2023–24 Oregon Ducks men's basketball team
