= 2023–24 California Golden Bears women's basketball team =

Intercollegiate basketball season

2023–24 California Golden Bears women's basketball

WBIT, Second Round
- Conference: Pac-12 Conference
- Record: 19–15 (7–11 Pac-12)
- Head coach: Charmin Smith (5th season)
- Assistant coaches: Heidi Heintz; Eliza Pierre; Travon Bryant
- Home arena: Haas Pavilion

2023–24 Pac-12 Conference women's basketball standings
| | Conf. | | | | Overall |
| Team | W | | L | PCT | W | | L | PCT |
|---|---|---|---|---|---|---|---|---|
| No. 9 Stanford | 15 | – | 3 | .833 | 30 | – | 6 | .833 |
| No. 5 USC † | 13 | – | 5 | .722 | 29 | – | 6 | .829 |
| No. 10 UCLA | 13 | – | 5 | .722 | 27 | – | 7 | .794 |
| No. 8 Oregon State | 12 | – | 6 | .667 | 27 | – | 8 | .771 |
| No. 15 Colorado | 11 | – | 7 | .611 | 24 | – | 10 | .706 |
| No. 22 Utah | 11 | – | 7 | .611 | 23 | – | 11 | .676 |
| Arizona | 8 | – | 10 | .444 | 18 | – | 16 | .529 |
| California | 7 | – | 11 | .389 | 19 | – | 15 | .559 |
| Washington State | 7 | – | 11 | .389 | 21 | – | 15 | .583 |
| Washington | 6 | – | 12 | .333 | 16 | – | 15 | .516 |
| Arizona State | 3 | – | 15 | .167 | 11 | – | 20 | .355 |
| Oregon | 2 | – | 16 | .111 | 11 | – | 21 | .344 |
† 2024 Pac-12 tournament winner Rankings from AP Poll

The 2023–24 California Golden Bears women's basketball team represented the University of California, Berkeley during the 2023–24 NCAA Division I women's basketball season. The Golden Bears, led by fifth year head coach Charmin Smith, played their home games at Haas Pavilion and competed as members of the Pac-12 Conference.

This was also the last season that California played in the Pac-12 Conference before moving to the Atlantic Coast Conference.

== Previous season ==
The Golden Bears finished the season 13–17, 4–14 in Pac-12 play to finish in a tie for tenth place. As a 10th seed in the Pac-12 women's tournament they lost in the first round to Washington State.

== Offseason ==
=== Departures ===
California Departures
| Name | Num. | Pos. | Height | Year | Hometown | Reason for departure |
|---|---|---|---|---|---|---|
| Amaya Bonner | 2 | G | 6'0" | Freshman | Fremont, CA | Transferred to Florida State |
| Karisma Ortiz | 4 | G | 6'0" | GS Senior | San Jose, CA | Graduated |
| Jadyn Bush | 12 | F | 5'11" | GS Senior | Federal Way, WA | Graduated |
| Evelien Lutje Schipholt | 24 | F | 6'2" | Senior | The Hague, Netherlands | Graduate transferred to South Florida |
| Jayda Curry | 30 | G | 5'6" | Sophomore | Corona, CA | Transferred to Louisville |
| Sela Heide | 32 | C | 6'7" | Junior | North Bend, WA | Transferred to Oregon State |
| Sirena Tuitele | 33 | F | 6'1" | GS Senior | Chico, CA | Graduated |

=== Incoming ===
Incoming transfers
| Name | Num | Pos. | Height | Year | Hometown | Previous School |
|---|---|---|---|---|---|---|
| Marta Suárez | 7 | G/F | 6'2" | (redshirt) Junior | Oviedo, Spain | Tennessee |
| Ila Lane | 12 | F/C | 6'4" | Senior | Moraga, CA | UC Santa Barbara |
| McKayla Williams | 24 | G | 6'1" | Senior | Los Angeles, CA | Gonzaga |
| Ioanna Krimili | 33 | G | 5'11" | (redshirt) Senior | Heraklion, Greece | San Francisco |

==== Recruiting ====
College recruiting
| Name | Hometown | School | Height | Weight | Commit date |
|---|---|---|---|---|---|
| Anastasia Drosouni; SG | Thessaloniki, Greece | Expaideftiria Fryganiotis | 5 ft 11 in (1.80 m) | N/A | May 2, 2023 |
| Anastasia Drosouni; SG | Recruit ratings: No ratings found | | | | |
| Lulu Laditan-Twidale; G | Sunshine Coast, Australia | Siena Catholic | 5 ft 9 in (1.75 m) | N/A | Jan 23, 2023 |
| Lulu Laditan-Twidale; G | Recruit ratings: No ratings found | | | | |
Overall recruit ranking:
Note: In many cases, Scout, Rivals, 247Sports, On3, and ESPN may conflict in their listings of height and weight.; In these cases, the average was taken. ESPN grades are on a 100-point scale.; Sources:

== Roster ==
2023–24 California Golden Bears women's basketball team
Players
Coaches

| Pos. | # | Name | Height | Year | Previous school | Hometown |
|---|---|---|---|---|---|---|
| F | 0 | Michelle Onyiah | 6 ft 3 in (1.91 m) | Sr | Eleanor Roosevelt | Eastvale, CA |
| G | 1 | Leilani McIntosh | 5 ft 5 in (1.65 m) | GS | Xavier College Prep | Phoenix, AZ |
| G | 7 | Marta Suárez | 6 ft 3 in (1.91 m) | RS Jr | Joaquim Blume Institute; Tennessee | Oviedo, Spain |
| G | 10 | Lulu Laditan-Twidale | 5 ft 9 in (1.75 m) | Fr | South West Metro Pirates | Sunshine Coast, Australia |
| F/C | 12 | Ila Lane | 6 ft 4 in (1.93 m) | GS | Woodside Priory; UC Santa Barbara | Moraga, CA |
| G | 14 | Alma Elsnitz | 5 ft 11 in (1.8 m) | Sr | Lulea Basketgymnasium | Stockholm, Sweden |
| G | 15 | Kemery Martín | 6 ft 0 in (1.83 m) | RS Jr | Corner Canyon; Utah | Sandy, UT |
| G | 21 | Mia Mastrov | 5 ft 11 in (1.8 m) | Jr | Miramonte | Lafayette, CA |
| F | 22 | Claudia Langarita | 6 ft 4 in (1.93 m) | Jr | INS Joaquim Blume; San Francisco | Barcelona, Spain |
| G | 23 | Anastasia Drosouni | 5 ft 11 in (1.8 m) | Fr | Expaideftiria Fryganiotis | Thessaloniki, Greece |
| G | 24 | McKayla Williams | 6 ft 1 in (1.85 m) | Sr | Windward; Gonzaga | Los Angeles, CA |
| G | 31 | Ornela Muca | 5 ft 7 in (1.7 m) | Sr | American Community School of Athens | Athens, Greece |
| G | 33 | Ioanna Krimili | 5 ft 10 in (1.78 m) | RS Sr | Aristotelio College; San Francisco | Heraklion, Greece |

Head coach

- Charmin Smith (Stanford)

Assistant coach(es)

- Heidi Heintz (UC Davis)
- Eliza Pierre (California)
- Travon Bryant (Missouri)

Legend

- (C) Team captain
- (S) Suspended
- (I) Ineligible
- (W) Walk-on
- Injured
- Current redshirt

Roster

== Schedule and results ==
| Date time, TV | Rank^{#} | Opponent^{#} | Result | Record | High points | High rebounds | High assists | Site (attendance) city, state |
Exhibition
| November 2, 2023*; 7:00 p.m. | | Westmont | W 93-51 | | – | – | – | Haas Pavilion; Berkeley, CA |
Non-conference regular season
| November 6, 2023*; 8:30 p.m. | | Cal State Bakersfield | W 89–56 | 1–0 | 18 – Krimili | 8 – Tied | 5 – Tied | Haas Pavilion (1,017); Berkeley, CA |
| November 8, 2023*; 7:00 p.m. | | Santa Clara | W 71–56 | 2–0 | 16 – Williams | 8 – Williams | 8 – McIntosh | Haas Pavilion (819); Berkeley, CA |
| November 13, 2023*; 3:00 p.m., P12N | | Cal Poly | W 74–60 | 3–0 | 17 – McIntosh | 8 – Tied | 4 – McIntosh | Haas Pavilion (617); Berkeley, CA |
| November 17, 2023*; 5:00 p.m., SECN+/ESPN+ | | at Auburn | W 67–53 | 4–0 | 27 – Suárez | 19 – Onyiah | 6 – McIntosh | Neville Arena (2,559); Auburn, AL |
| November 20, 2023*; 2:00 p.m., ESPN+ | | at Florida A&M; Pac-12/SWAC Legacy Series | W 76–38 | 5–0 | 25 – McIntosh | 18 – Onyiah | 5 – McIntosh | Al Lawson Center (887); Tallahassee, FL |
| November 24, 2023*; 12:00 p.m. | | San Jose State; Raising the B.A.R. Invitational semifinals | W 74–51 | 6–0 | 13 – Onyiah | 12 – Williams | 6 – McIntosh | Haas Pavilion (617); Berkeley, CA |
| November 25, 2023*; 2:30 p.m. | | Texas A&M; Raising the B.A.R. Invitational championship | L 51–65 | 6–1 | 12 – Tied | 12 – Williams | 8 – McIntosh | Haas Pavilion (843); Berkeley, CA |
| December 2, 2023*; 12:00 p.m., P12N | | Saint Mary's | W 74–69 | 7–1 | 15 – Lane | 8 – Onyiah | 8 – McIntosh | Haas Pavilion (964); Berkeley, CA |
| December 7, 2023*; 7:00 p.m., P12N | | No. 23 Gonzaga | L 70–78 ^{OT} | 7–2 | 19 – Suárez | 10 – Suárez | 11 – McIntosh | Haas Pavilion (1,109); Berkeley, CA |
| December 9, 2023*; 2:00 p.m. | | Nevada | W 76–49 | 8–2 | 20 – Williams | 8 – Suárez | 8 – McIntosh | Haas Pavilion (1,024); Berkeley, CA |
| December 15, 2023*; 11:30 a.m. | | Eastern Washington | W 78–70 | 9–2 | 17 – Suárez | 11 – Suárez | 5 – McIntosh | Haas Pavilion (4,112); Berkeley, CA |
| December 21, 2023*; 2:00 p.m. | | Louisiana–Monroe | W 79–55 | 10–2 | 21 – Laditan-Twidale | 11 – Tied | 7 – McIntosh | Haas Pavilion (617); Berkeley, CA |
Pac-12 regular season
| December 29, 2023; 2:00 p.m., P12N | | No. 9 Stanford | L 51–78 | 10–3 (0–1) | 12 – Krimili | 9 – Lane | 4 – McIntosh | Haas Pavilion (4,197); Berkeley, CA |
| January 5, 2024; 7:00 p.m., P12N | | Washington | W 70–57 | 11–3 (1–1) | 21 – Krimili | 8 – Onyiah | 4 – Krimili | Haas Pavilion (1,207); Berkeley, CA |
| January 7, 2024; 12:00 p.m., P12N | | Washington State | W 73–72 ^{OT} | 12–3 (2–1) | 21 – Krimili | 12 – Suárez | 6 – McIntosh | Haas Pavilion (1,249); Berkeley, CA |
| January 12, 2024; 6:00 p.m., P12N | | at No. 5 Colorado | L 61–76 | 12–4 (2–2) | 14 – Suárez | 9 – Suárez | 3 – Krimili | CU Events Center (3,540); Boulder, CO |
| January 14, 2024; 11:00 a.m., P12N | | at No. 19 Utah | L 56–93 | 12–5 (2–3) | 14 – Krimili | 9 – Williams | 4 – McIntosh | Jon M. Huntsman Center (4,520); Salt Lake City, UT |
| January 19, 2024; 7:00 p.m., P12N | | Oregon State | L 64–71 | 12–6 (2–4) | 27 – Beers | 15 – Beers | 9 – von Oelhoffen | Haas Pavilion (1,382); Berkeley, CA |
| January 21, 2024; 12:00 p.m., P12N | | Oregon | W 66–57 | 13–6 (3–4) | 24 – Krimili | 10 – Tied | 5 – Williams | Haas Pavilion (1,347); Berkeley, CA |
| January 26, 2024; 6:00 p.m., P12N | | at Arizona | L 55–66 | 13–7 (3–5) | 11 – Suárez | 6 – Onyiah | 5 – McIntosh | McKale Center (7,268); Tucson, AZ |
| January 28, 2024; 11:00 a.m., P12N | | at Arizona State | L 71–76 | 13–8 (3–6) | 20 – Krimili | 8 – Onyiah | 6 – Krimili | Desert Financial Arena (1,650); Tempe, AZ |
| February 2, 2024; 7:00 p.m., P12N | | No. 7 UCLA | L 58–78 | 13–9 (3–7) | 21 – Onyiah | 6 – Onyiah | 7 – McIntosh | Haas Pavilion (3,784); Berkeley, CA |
| February 4, 2024; 12:00 p.m., P12N | | No. 15 USC | L 69–79 | 13–10 (3–8) | 21 – Krimili | 9 – Suárez | 4 – Tied | Haas Pavilion (4,356); Berkeley, CA |
| February 9, 2024; 7:00 p.m., P12N | | at Washington State | W 66–59 | 14–10 (4–8) | 15 – Onyiah | 10 – Onyiah | 5 – McIntosh | Beasley Coliseum (1,023); Pullman, WA |
| February 11, 2024; 12:00 p.m., P12N | | at Washington | W 59–57 | 15–10 (5–8) | 14 – Tied | 6 – Martin | 3 – McIntosh | Alaska Airlines Arena (2,773); Seattle, WA |
| February 16, 2024; 7:00 p.m., P12N | | at No. 3 Stanford | L 49–84 | 15–11 (5–9) | 12 – Onyiah | 6 – McIntosh | 2 – Tied | Maples Pavilion (4,604); Stanford, CA |
| February 23, 2024; 7:00 p.m., P12N | | Arizona State | W 67–55 | 16–11 (6–9) | 21 – Suárez | 11 – Onyiah | 6 – McIntosh | Haas Pavilion (1,872); Berkeley, CA |
| February 25, 2024; 12:00 p.m., P12N | | Arizona | L 68–87 | 16–12 (6–10) | 24 – Laditan-Twidale | 4 – Lane | 5 – McIntosh | Haas Pavilion (1,909); Berkeley, CA |
| February 29, 2024; 7:00 p.m., P12N | | at Oregon | W 62–59 | 17–12 (7–10) | 21 – Krimili | 12 – Suárez | 3 – Tied | Matthew Knight Arena (5,914); Eugene, OR |
| March 2, 2024; 12:00 p.m., P12N | | at No. 11 Oregon State | L 58–79 | 17–13 (7–11) | 14 – Suárez | 5 – Tied | 2 – McIntosh | Gill Coliseum (6,377); Corvallis, OR |
Pac-12 Women's Tournament
| March 6, 2024; 2:30 p.m., P12N | (8) | vs. (9) Washington State; First Round | W 65–44 | 18–13 | 19 – McIntosh | 10 – Suárez | 5 – McIntosh | MGM Grand Garden Arena; Paradise, NV |
| March 7, 2024; 2:30 p.m., P12N | (8) | vs. (1) No. 2 Stanford; Quarterfinals | L 57–71 | 18–14 | 14 – Suárez | 8 – Williams | 3 – Tied | MGM Grand Garden Arena (4,883); Paradise, NV |
WBIT
| March 21, 2024*; 7:00 p.m., ESPN+ | (2) | Hawaii; First Round | W 65–60 | 19–14 | 20 – Laditan-Twidale | 12 – Onyiah | 6 – McIntosh | Haas Pavilion (761); Berkeley, CA |
| March 24, 2024*; 1:00 p.m., ESPN+ | (2) | (3) Saint Joseph's; Second Round | L 61–63 | 19–15 | 20 – Suárez | 13 – Suárez | 3 – Tied | Haas Pavilion (607); Berkeley, CA |
*Non-conference game. ^{#}Rankings from AP Poll. (#) Tournament seedings in parentheses. All times are in Pacific Time.

== Rankings ==
Ranking movements
| | Week | | | | | | | | | | | | | | | | | | | | |
| Poll | Pre | 1 | 2 | 3 | 4 | 5 | 6 | 7 | 8 | 9 | 10 | 11 | 12 | 13 | 14 | 15 | 16 | 17 | 18 | 19 | Final |
|---|---|---|---|---|---|---|---|---|---|---|---|---|---|---|---|---|---|---|---|---|---|
| AP | | * | | | | | | | | | | | | | | | | | | | Not released |
| Coaches | | * | ^ | | | | | | | | | | | | | | | | | | |

*The preseason and week 1 polls were the same.

== See also ==
- 2023–24 California Golden Bears men's basketball team
