= 2023–24 USC Trojans women's basketball team =

Intercollegiate basketball season

2023–1924 USC Trojans women's basketball

Pac-12 tournament champions

NCAA tournament, Elite Eight
- Conference: Pac-12 Conference

Ranking
- Coaches: No. 6
- AP: No. 5
- Record: 29–6 (13–5 Pac-12)
- Head coach: Lindsay Gottlieb (3rd season)
- Assistant coaches: Beth Burns (2nd season); Wendale Farrow (3rd season); Willnett Crockett (1st season); Courtney Jaco (1st season)
- Home arena: Galen Center

2023–24 Pac-12 Conference women's basketball standings
	Conf.				Overall
Team	W		L	PCT	W		L	PCT
No. 9 Stanford	15	–	3	.833	30	–	6	.833
No. 5 USC †	13	–	5	.722	29	–	6	.829
No. 10 UCLA	13	–	5	.722	27	–	7	.794
No. 8 Oregon State	12	–	6	.667	27	–	8	.771
No. 15 Colorado	11	–	7	.611	24	–	10	.706
No. 22 Utah	11	–	7	.611	23	–	11	.676
Arizona	8	–	10	.444	18	–	16	.529
California	7	–	11	.389	19	–	15	.559
Washington State	7	–	11	.389	21	–	15	.583
Washington	6	–	12	.333	16	–	15	.516
Arizona State	3	–	15	.167	11	–	20	.355
Oregon	2	–	16	.111	11	–	21	.344
† 2024 Pac-12 tournament winner Rankings from AP Poll

The 2023–24 USC Trojans women's basketball team represented the University of Southern California during the 2023–24 NCAA Division I women's basketball season. The Trojans played their home games at the Galen Center and were members of the Pac-12 Conference. This was the last year the team played in the Pac-12 as they are slated to join the Big Ten Conference. The squad was led by third-year head coach Lindsay Gottlieb. The Trojans finished as 2024 Pac-12 Conference women's basketball tournament champions and made it to the Elite 8. They finished the season with a No. 5 AP ranking and a No. 6 ranking in the Coaches' poll.

USC started off ranked No. 21 in the preseason rankings in both the AP and Coaches Polls. For the final regular season AP poll, they finished in 5th. Although they were picked to finished 6th by the last-ever Pac-12 coaches poll, the team finished tied for second. They earned the 2-seed in the Pac-12 tournament as they held the second tiebreaker over UCLA. In the 2024 NCAA Division I women's basketball tournament, they earned a 1-seed for the first time since 1986.

== Previous season ==
The Women of Troy finished the regular Pac-12 season tied for 4th with UCLA and Arizona. Because both of those teams held tiebreakers over USC, the Trojans earned the 6th seed in the 2023 Pac-12 Conference women's basketball tournament.

The squad earned its first bid for the NCAA Women's Division I Basketball Tournament since 2014. and its first at-large bid since 2006. Holding an 8-seed in the 2023 NCAA tournament, the Women of Troy fell in overtime in the first round to 9-seeded South Dakota State, 62–57.

Last year's team spent much of the season receiving votes in both polls and made the top 25 once in the AP Poll. In the last AP Poll, they received 3 votes while they no longer received any votes in the final two coaches' polls.

== Offseason changes ==
The Women of Troy brought in 2 first-years out of high school, 1 transfer student, and 4 graduate students. 1 student who red-shirted last year is also expected to play this coming season. 6 players from the previous year graduated while 1 transferred and 1 retired.

Regarding coaching staff, Women of Troy alumna Courtney Jaco, who previously served as Director of Player Development and who as a player won the 2014 Pac-12 tournament to qualify for the NCAA tournament, was promoted to Assistant Coach. Wilnett Crockett also joined the coaching staff as an Assistant Coach and Recruiting Coordinator. Meanwhile, Nneka Enemkpali joined the Rutgers coaching staff during the off-season.

=== Departures ===
Name	Number	Pos.	Height	Year	Hometown	Reason for Departure
Koi Love	0	F	6'0"	Junior	Orlando, FL	Transferred to UT Arlington
Destiny Littleton	11	G	5'9"	Graduate Student	San Diego, CA	Graduated
Bella Perkins	12	F	5'9"	Sophomore	Fairfax, VA	Transferred to Pittsburgh
Madison Campbell	23	G	5'11"	RS Junior	Fresno, CA	Retired for Medical Reasons
Okako Adika	24	G/F	6'0"	Graduate Student	Holstebro, DK	Graduated
Alyson Miura	25	G	5'9"	Senior	Clackamas, OR	Graduated
Kadi Sissoko	30	F	6'2"	Graduate Student	Paris, FR	Graduated
Rokia Doumbia	52	G	5'9"	Graduate Student	Bamako, ML	Graduated

=== Incoming transfers ===
Name	Num	Pos.	Height	Year	Hometown	Previous School
McKenzie Forbes	0	W	6'0"	Graduate Transfer	Folsom, CA	Harvard
Dominique Onu	23	G	5'9"	Junior	Los Angeles, CA	UCLA
Kaitlyn Davis	24	G/F	6'0"	Graduate Transfer	Norwalk, CT	Columbia
Roxane Makolo	24	G	5'10"	Graduate Transfer	Saint-Hubert, QC, CA	Purdue
Kayla Padilla	45	G	5'9"	Graduate Transfer	Torrance, CA	Penn

=== 2023 recruiting class ===
Name	Overall Rank	Position	Position Rank	Hometown	High School	Height	ESPN Stars	ESPN Grade
JuJu Watkins	1	PG/SG	1	Los Angeles, CA	Sierra Canyon	6'0"	5	98
Malia Samuels	-	G	-	Seattle, WA	Garfield HS	5'6"	4	94

The Women of Troy brought in the tenth-ranked recruiting class in the country. The incoming squad featured top-ranked high school recruit JuJu Watkins and 49th-ranked Malia Samuels. Redshirt first-year Aaliyah Gayles also played periodically after having sat out the previous season due to injury. Gayles, ranked No. 8 in the country for the class of 2022, was recruited by previous head coach Mark Trakh

== Roster ==
2023–24 USC Trojans women's basketball team
Players
Coaches

Pos.	#	Name	Height	Year	Previous school	Hometown
G	1	Taylor Bigby	6 ft 1 in (1.85 m)	Jr	Oregon	Las Vegas, NV
G	2	India Otto (W)	5 ft 9 in (1.75 m)	GS	Windward School	Los Angeles, CA
G	3	Aaliyah Gayles (injured)	5 ft 9 in (1.75 m)	RS Fr	Spring Valley HS	Las Vegas, NV
G	4	Kayla Williams	5 ft 7 in (1.7 m)	Sr	UC Irvine	Los Angeles, CA
G	10	Malia Samuels	5 ft 6 in (1.68 m)	Fr	Garfield HS	Seattle, WA
G	12	JuJu Watkins	6 ft 0 in (1.83 m)	Fr	Sierra Canyon	Los Angeles, CA
G/F	13	Rayah Marshall	6 ft 4 in (1.93 m)	Jr	Lynwood HS	Los Angeles, CA
G	23	Dominique Onu	5 ft 9 in (1.75 m)	RS Jr	UCLA	Los Angeles, CA
G	24	Kaitlyn Davis	6 ft 0 in (1.83 m)	GS	Columbia	Norwalk, CT
G	25	McKenzie Forbes	6 ft 0 in (1.83 m)	GS	Harvard	Folsom, CA
G	30	Roxane Makolo	5 ft 10 in (1.78 m)	GS	Purdue	Quebec, CA
C	32	Clarice Akunwafo	6 ft 6 in (1.98 m)	Jr	Rolling Hills Prep	Inglewood, CA
G	45	Kayla Padilla	5 ft 9 in (1.75 m)	GS	Penn	Torrance, CA

Head coach

- Lindsay Gottlieb (Brown)

Assistant coach(es)

- Beth Burns (Ohio Wesleyan)
- Wendale Farrow (Eastern Michigan)
- Courtney Jaco (USC)
- Wilnett Crockett (Connecticut)

Legend

- (C) Team captain
- (S) Suspended
- (I) Ineligible
- (W) Walk-on
- Injured
- Current redshirt

Roster
Last update: November 7, 2023

== Schedule and results ==
Date time, TV	Rank^{#}	Opponent^{#}	Result	Record	High points	High rebounds	High assists	Site city, state
Non-conference regular season
November 6, 2023*; 11:00 a.m., TruTV	No. 21	vs. No. 7 Ohio State; Hall of Fame Series Las Vegas	W 83–74	1–0	32 – Watkins	17 – Marshall	5 – Watkins	T-Mobile Arena; Paradise, NV
November 10, 2023*; 7:00 p.m.	No. 21	Florida Gulf Coast	W 67–51	2–0	18 – Tied	7 – Tied	6 – Forbes	Galen Center (4,712); Los Angeles, CA
November 13, 2023*; 5:30 p.m.	No. 10	Le Moyne	W 93–43	3–0	35 – Watkins	9 – Watkins	5 – Forbes	Galen Center (1,009); Los Angeles, CA
November 20, 2023*; 6:00 p.m., FloHoops	No. 8	vs. Seton Hall; Baha Mar Pink Flamingo Championship	W 64–54	4–0	15 – Watkins	15 – Marshall	3 – Tied	Baha Mar Convention Center (409); Nassau, Bahamas
November 22, 2023*; 6:00 p.m., FloHoops	No. 8	vs. Penn State; Baha Mar Pink Flamingo Championship	W 71–70	5–0	31 – Watkins	12 – Watkins	3 – Watkins	Baha Mar Convention Center (297); Nassau, Bahamas
November 28, 2023*; 7:00 p.m.	No. 6	Cal Poly	W 85–44	6–0	30 – Watkins	8 – Akunwafo	6 – Padilla	Galen Center (1,419); Los Angeles, CA
December 3, 2023*; 3:00 p.m.	No. 6	San Diego	W 89–58	7–0	30 – Watkins	12 – Marshall	6 – Padilla	Galen Center (2,169); Los Angeles, CA
December 10, 2023*; 3:30 p.m.	No. 6	UC Riverside	W 85–53	8–0	27 – Watkins	12 – Marshall	5 – Tied	Galen Center (4,201); Los Angeles, CA
December 18, 2023*; 7:00 p.m., P12N	No. 6	Cal State Fullerton	W 93–44	9–0	23 – Watkins	6 – Tied	6 – Watkins	Galen Center (1,962); Los Angeles, CA
December 21, 2023*; 2:00 p.m., ESPN+	No. 6	at Long Beach State	W 85–77	10–0	36 – Forbes	8 – Akunwafo	4 – Tied	Walter Pyramid (1,243); Long Beach, CA
Pac-12 Conference Regular season
December 30, 2023; 5:00 p.m., P12N	No. 6	at No. 2 UCLA; Rivalry	L 64–71	10–1 (0–1)	27 – Watkins	13 – Marshall	5 – Padilla	Pauley Pavilion (13,659); Los Angeles, CA
January 5, 2024; 7:00 p.m., P12N	No. 9	Oregon State	W 56–54	11–1 (1–1)	28 – Watkins	14 – Marshall	5 – Marshall	Galen Center (2,749); Los Angeles, CA
January 7, 2024; 12:00 p.m., P12N	No. 9	Oregon	W 68–54	12–1 (2–1)	17 – Watkins	9 – Tied	6 – Watkins	Galen Center (2,282); Los Angeles, CA
January 14, 2024; 2:00 p.m., P12N	No. 9	No. 2 UCLA; Rivalry	W 73–65	13–1 (3–1)	32 – Watkins	10 – Watkins	4 – Forbes	Galen Center (10,258); Los Angeles, CA
January 19, 2024; 6:00 p.m., P12N	No. 6	at No. 20 Utah	L 58–78	13–2 (3–2)	26 – Watkins	6 – Davis	2 – Watkins	Jon M. Huntsman Center (5,561); Salt Lake City, UT
January 21, 2024; 12:00 p.m., P12N	No. 6	at No. 3 Colorado	L 59–63	13–3 (3–3)	20 – Watkins	6 – Marshall	3 – Tied	CU Events Center (8,474); Boulder, CO
January 26, 2024; 7:00 p.m., P12N	No. 11	Washington State	W 70–62	14–3 (4–3)	29 – Watkins	7 – Tied	5 – Padilla	Galen Center (2,671); Los Angeles, CA
January 28, 2024; 12:00 p.m., P12N	No. 11	Washington	L 59–62	14–4 (4–4)	20 – Padilla	11 – Marshall	4 – Tied	Galen Center (3,416); Los Angeles, CA
February 2, 2024; 7:00 p.m., P12N	No. 15	at No. 4 Stanford	W 67–58	15–4 (5–4)	51 – Watkins	11 – Watkins	2 – Tied	Maples Pavilion (5,371); Stanford, CA
February 4, 2024; 12:00 p.m., P12N	No. 15	at California	W 79–69	16–4 (6–4)	29 – Watkins	8 – Davis	5 – Tied	Haas Pavilion (4,356); Berkeley, CA
February 9, 2024; 7:00 p.m., P12N	No. 10	Arizona State	W 81–63	17–4 (7–4)	31 – Watkins	16 – Marshall	6 – Padilla	Galen Center (3,128); Los Angeles, CA
February 12, 2024; 6:00 p.m., ESPN2	No. 10	Arizona	W 81–64	18–4 (8–4)	32 – Watkins	10 – Marshall	7 – Padilla	Galen Center (4,569); Los Angeles, CA
February 16, 2024; 7:00 p.m., P12N	No. 10	at Oregon	W 88–51	19–4 (9–4)	33 – Watkins	12 – Marshall	5 – Davis	Matthew Knight Arena (7,145); Eugene, OR
February 18, 2024; 12:00 p.m., P12N	No. 10	at No. 11 Oregon State	W 58–50	20–4 (10–4)	18 – Watkins	17 – Marshall	2 – Tied	Gill Coliseum (8,210); Corvallis, OR
February 23, 2024; 7:00 p.m., P12N	No. 7	No. 11 Colorado	W 87–81	21–4 (11–4)	42 – Watkins	5 – Tied	7 – Forbes	Galen Center (5,762); Los Angeles, CA
February 25, 2024; 12:00 p.m., P12N	No. 7	No. 18 Utah	L 68–74	21–5 (11–5)	30 – Watkins	8 – Tied	5 – Watkins	Galen Center (7,129); Los Angeles, CA
February 29, 2024; 5:00 p.m., P12N	No. 7	at Arizona	W 95–93 ^{2OT}	22–5 (12–5)	26 – Marshall	11 – Marshall	5 – Forbes	McKale Center (7,594); Tucson, AZ
March 2, 2024; 11:00 a.m., P12N	No. 7	at Arizona State	W 70–55	23–5 (13–5)	26 – Watkins	15 – Marshall	4 – Forbes	Desert Financial Arena (2,739); Tempe, AZ
Pac-12 Women's Tournament
March 7, 2024; 6:00 p.m., P12N	(2) No. 5	vs. (7) Arizona; Quarterfinals	W 65–62	24–5	17 – Watkins	15 – Marshall	5 – Forbes	MGM Grand Garden Arena; Paradise, NV
March 8, 2024; 7:30 p.m., P12N	(2) No. 5	vs. (3) No. 7 UCLA; Semifinals/Rivalry	W 80–70 ^{2OT}	25–5	33 – Watkins	16 – Davis	3 – Padilla	MGM Grand Garden Arena (5,713); Paradise, NV
March 10, 2024; 2:00 p.m., ESPN	(2) No. 5	vs. (1) No. 2 Stanford; Championship	W 74–61	26–5	26 – Forbes	18 – Marshall	5 – Davis	MGM Grand Garden Arena (5,526); Paradise, NV
NCAA Tournament
March 23, 2024*; 1:30 p.m., ESPN	(1 P3) No. 3	(16 P3) Texas A&M–Corpus Christi; First Round	W 87–55	27–5	23 – Tied	7 – Marshall	4 – Tied	Galen Center (8,386); Los Angeles, CA
March 25, 2024*; 7:00 p.m., ESPN	(1 P3) No. 3	(8 P3) Kansas; Second Round	W 73–55	28–5	28 – Watkins	11 – Watkins	5 – Watkins	Galen Center (8,941); Los Angeles, CA
March 30, 2024*; 2:30 p.m., ESPN	(1 P3) No. 3	vs. (5 P3) No. 19 Baylor; Sweet Sixteen	W 74–70	29–5	30 – Watkins	16 – Marshall	4 – Watkins	Moda Center (10,104); Portland, OR
April 1, 2024*; 6:31 p.m., ESPN	(1 P3) No. 3	vs. (3 P3) No. 10 UConn; Elite Eight	L 73–80	29–6	27 – Watkins	11 – Marshall	3 – Forbes	Moda Center (10,869); Portland, OR
*Non-conference game. ^{#}Rankings from AP Poll. (#) Tournament seedings in parentheses. P3=Portland 3. All times are in Pacific Time.

Source: USCTrojans.com

=== NCAA women's basketball tournament ===
==== Portland regional 3 - Portland, Oregon ====
First round Round of 64; March 22–23
1	USC	84
16	Texas A&M–Corpus Christi	55
Los Angeles, California – Sat/Mon
8	Kansas	81^{OT}
9	Michigan	72
5	Baylor	80
12	Vanderbilt	63
Blacksburg, Virginia – Fri/Sun
4	Virginia Tech	92
13	Marshall	49
6	Syracuse	74
11	Arizona	69
Storrs, Connecticut – Sat/Mon
3	UConn	86
14	Jackson State	64
7	Duke	72
10	Richmond	61
Columbus, Ohio – Fri/Sun
2	Ohio State	80
15	Maine	57

Second round Round of 32; March 24–25
1	USC	73
8	Kansas	55
5	Baylor	75
4	Virginia Tech	72
6	Syracuse	64
3	UConn	72
7	Duke	75
2	Ohio State	63

Regional semifinals Sweet 16; March 30
1	USC	74
5	Baylor	70
3	UConn	53
7	Duke	45

Regional Final; Elite 8 April 1
1	USC	73
3	UConn	80

===== Portland regional 3 final =====
ESPN

April 1
9:31 p.m. EDT

No. 1 USC 73, No. 3 UConn 80
Scoring by quarter: 17-15, 16–18, 18–22, 22–25

Moda Center – Portland, Oregon
Attendance: 10,869
Referees: Maj Forsberg, Kyle Bacon, Brian Hall

== Game summaries ==
This section will be filled in as the season progresses.

== Rankings ==
Ranking movements Legend: ██ Increase in ranking ██ Decrease in ranking т = Tied with team above or below
	Week																				
Poll	Pre	1	2	3	4	5	6	7	8	9	10	11	12	13	14	15	16	17	18	19	Final
AP	21	10	8	6	6	6	6	6	9	9	6	11	15	10	10	7	7	5	3	3	5
Coaches	21	10т	10	8	6	5	5	5	6	6	4	10	15	11	10	7	9	8	3	3	6

=== Awards and honors ===
- Forbes
  - All-Pac-12 Team
  - Cheryl Miller Preseason Watchlist
  - Pac-12 Player of the Week
  - Ann Meyers Drysdale Women's National Players of the Week
  - Cheryl Miller Award Top 10 List
  - Pac-12 Tournament Most Outstanding Player
- Gayles
  - Tammy Blackburn Inspiration Award
- Marshall
  - All-Pac-12 Team Honorable Mention
  - All-Pac-12 Defensive Team Honorable Mention
  - Silver Medalist at the 2023 FIBA Women's AmeriCup.
  - Jersey Mike's Naismith Award Watchlist
  - Lisa Leslie Preaseason Watchlist
  - Preseason All-Pac-12 Team
  - John Wooden Award Preseason Top 50 Watchlist
  - Naismith Women's College Defensive Player of the Year Watch List
- Watkins
  - No. 1 recruit in the nation
  - National Gatorade Player of the Year
  - Pac-12 Freshman of the Year
  - All-Pac-12 Team
  - All-Pac-12 Defensive Team Honorable Mention
  - Pac-12 All-Tournament Team
  - ESPN National Freshman of the Year
  - ESPN All-America Team
  - ESPN National Player of the Year Runner Up
  - The Athletic Freshman of the Year award
  - The Athletic First Team All American
  - Gold Medalist and MVP of the 2022 FIBA Under-17 Women's Basketball World Cup
  - 2020 Sports Illustrated Sports Kid of the Year
  - McDonald's All-American
  - Los Angeles Times Girls Basketball Player of the Year, 2021, 2022, 2023
  - USA Today Girls Basketball Player of the Year
  - Dawn Staley Award Finalist
  - Finalist, Honda Sport Award for Basketball
  - NCAA Record holder for any first-year in women's college basketball
  - Jersey Mike's Naismith Award Watchlist
  - Preseason All-Pac-12 Honorable Mention
  - USBWA Tamika Catchings Freshman of the Week (3x)
  - USBWA Tamika Catchings Award, National Freshman Player of the Year
  - USBWA Ann Meyers Drysdale National Player of the Week
  - USBWA All-America Team
  - Pac-12 Freshman of the Week (x14) - All-Time Pac-12 record
  - Pac-12 Player of the Week (x3) - Only player in history to sweep Player of the Week and Freshman of the week multiple times.
  - John Wooden Award Preseason Top 50 Watchlist
  - John Wooden Award Midseason Top 25 Watchlist
  - John Wooden Award Late Season Top 20 Watchlist
  - John Wooden Award Finalist
  - Wooden All-American
  - AP National Player of the Week (x2)
  - Ann Meyers Drysdale Award Top 10 List
  - Ann Meyers Drysdale Award Final Five
  - Ann Meyers Drysdale Shooting Guard of the Year Award
  - Lily Margaret Wade Watchlist
  - WBCA Freshman of the Year
  - Naismith Women's College Player of the Week
  - ESPN Player of the Week
  - Naismith Women's College Player of the Year Midseason List
  - Semifinalist, Jersey Mike's Naismith Player of the Year
  - NCAA Starting Five of the Week
- Gottlieb
  - ESPN Coach of the Week
  - Naismith Women's Basketball Coach of the Year Late Season Watch List
  - Semifinalist, Werner Ladder Naismith Coach of the Year
- Team
  - ESPN Team of the Week
  - Pac-12 Tournament Champions

== See also ==
- 2023–24 USC Trojans men's basketball team
