= Pac-12 Conference women's basketball tournament =

Pac-12 women's basketball tournament
- Conference basketball championship
- Sport: Basketball
- Conference: Pac-12 Conference
- Number of teams: 10 (2002–2011); 12 (2012–2024); 9 (2027–future)
- Format: Single-elimination tournament
- Current stadium: Michelob Ultra Arena
- Current location: Paradise, NV
- Played: 2002–2024, 2027–future
- Last contest: 2024
- Current champion: USC (2)
- Most championships: Stanford Cardinal (15)
- TV partner(s): USA Network and The CW
- Official website: Pac-12.com Women's Basketball

Host stadiums
- McArthur Court (2002); HP Pavilion (2003–2008); Galen Center (2009, 2010, 2012); Staples Center (2011); KeyArena (2013–2018); MGM Grand Garden Arena (2019, 2024); Michelob Ultra Arena (2020–2023)

Host locations
- Eugene, Oregon (2002); San Jose, California (2003–2008); Los Angeles, California (2009–2012); Seattle, Washington (2013–2018); Paradise, Nevada (2019–present)

The Pac-12 Conference women's basketball tournament, otherwise known as the Pac-12 tournament, was the annual concluding tournament for the NCAA women's college basketball in the Pac-12. The Tournament was held every year from 2002 to 2024. From 2002 to 2010, it was called the Pac-10. Seeding was based on regular season records. The tournament was held at different conference city locations through the 2012 season.

After a six-year run at KeyArena in Seattle from 2013 to 2018, the tournament moved to the Las Vegas Strip, already the location for the Pac-12 men's tournament, for at least 2019 and 2020, due to the closure of KeyArena for major renovations to accommodate the Seattle Kraken. On March 5, 2016, the Pac-12 announced that it had agreed to extend its contract to keep the women's tournament in Seattle until 2019. However, the conference ended the contract a season early, moving the women's tournament to the Las Vegas Strip for 2019 and 2020 because KeyArena was slated for a major two-year renovation and upgrade. The 2019 tournament was held at MGM Grand Garden Arena, and the 2020 edition was at Mandalay Bay Events Center.

On October 4, 2019, the Pac-12 announced that it had agreed to extend its contract to keep the women's tournament in Las Vegas until 2022.

The Pac-12 lost all but two of its members after the 2023–24 season, leading the remaining members, Oregon State and Washington State, to become affiliates of the West Coast Conference in most sports, including women's basketball, in 2024–25 and 2025–26. However, in a span of less than three weeks in September 2024, the Pac-12 added six new members effective in 2026–27—Boise State, Colorado State, Fresno State, Gonzaga, San Diego State, and Utah State. Texas State was later added, also effective in 2026–27. With nine confirmed members, the conference tournament is likely to resume in 2027.

== Champions ==
Tournament champions receive an automatic bid to the year's NCAA Division I women's basketball tournament. Numbers in parentheses refer to each team's finish/seed in the tournament for that year.

| Year | (Seed) Champion | Score | (Seed) Runner-up | Location | Most Outstanding Player |
|---|---|---|---|---|---|
| 2002 | (3) Arizona State | 70–63 | (1) Stanford | McArthur Court, Eugene, Oregon | Nicole Powell, Stanford |
| 2003 | (1) Stanford | 59–49 | (3) Arizona | HP Pavilion, San Jose, California | Nicole Powell (2), Stanford |
| 2004 | (1) Stanford | 51–46 | (2) Arizona | HP Pavilion, San Jose, California | Nicole Powell (3), Stanford |
| 2005 | (1) Stanford | 56–42 | (3) Arizona State | HP Pavilion, San Jose, California | Candice Wiggins, Stanford |
| 2006 | (3) UCLA | 85–76 (OT) | (1) Stanford | HP Pavilion, San Jose, California | Lisa Willis, UCLA |
| 2007 | (1) Stanford | 62–55 | (2) Arizona State | HP Pavilion, San Jose, California | Candice Wiggins (2), Stanford |
| 2008 | (1) Stanford | 56–35 | (2) California | HP Pavilion, San Jose, California | Candice Wiggins (3), Stanford |
| 2009 | (1) Stanford | 89–64 | (6) USC | Galen Center, Los Angeles, California | Kayla Pedersen, Stanford |
| 2010 | (1) Stanford | 70–46 | (2) UCLA | Galen Center, Los Angeles, CA | Nneka Ogwumike, Stanford |
| 2011 | (1) Stanford | 64–55 | (2) UCLA | Galen Center/Staples Center, Los Angeles, CA | Nneka Ogwumike (2), Stanford |
| 2012 | (1) Stanford | 77–62 | (2) California | Galen Center/Staples Center, Los Angeles, CA | Nneka Ogwumike (3), Stanford |
| 2013 | (1) Stanford | 51–49 | (3) UCLA | KeyArena, Seattle, Washington | Chiney Ogwumike, Stanford |
| 2014 | (5) USC | 71–62 | (3) Oregon State | KeyArena, Seattle, Washington | Ariya Crook, USC |
| 2015 | (3) Stanford | 61–60 | (4) California | KeyArena, Seattle, Washington | Taylor Greenfield, Stanford |
| 2016 | (1) Oregon State | 69–57 | (3) UCLA | KeyArena, Seattle, Washington | Jamie Weisner, Oregon State |
| 2017 | (2) Stanford | 48–43 | (1) Oregon State | KeyArena, Seattle, Washington | Erica McCall, Stanford |
| 2018 | (1) Oregon | 77–57 | (2) Stanford | KeyArena, Seattle, Washington | Sabrina Ionescu, Oregon |
| 2019 | (2) Stanford | 64–57 | (1) Oregon | MGM Grand Garden Arena, Paradise, Nevada | Alanna Smith, Stanford |
| 2020 | (1) Oregon | 89–56 | (3) Stanford | Mandalay Bay Events Center, Paradise, Nevada | Sabrina Ionescu (2), Oregon |
| 2021 | (1) Stanford | 75–55 | (3) UCLA | Michelob Ultra Arena, Paradise, Nevada | Kiana Williams, Stanford |
| 2022 | (1) Stanford | 73–48 | (6) Utah | Michelob Ultra Arena, Paradise, Nevada | Haley Jones, Stanford |
| 2023 | (7) Washington State | 65–61 | (5) UCLA | Michelob Ultra Arena, Paradise, Nevada | Charlisse Leger-Walker, Washington State |
| 2024 | (2) USC | 74–61 | (1) Stanford | MGM Grand Garden Arena, Paradise, Nevada | McKenzie Forbes, USC |
| 2025 | On hiatus | | | | |
| 2026 | On hiatus | | | | |
| 2027 | | | | MGM Grand Garden Arena, Paradise, Nevada | |

== Overall Record by team ==
| School | W | L | Pct. | Championships | Runners-Up |
|---|---|---|---|---|---|
| Stanford | 56 | 8 | (.875) | 15 | 5 |
| UCLA | 28 | 22 | (.560) | 1 | 7 |
| California | 22 | 23 | (.489) | – | 3 |
| USC | 20 | 21 | (.488) | 2 | 1 |
| Oregon State | 18 | 22 | (.450) | 1 | 2 |
| Oregon | 16 | 21 | (.432) | 2 | 1 |
| Arizona State | 16 | 22 | (.421) | 1 | 2 |
| Colorado | 10 | 13 | (.435) | – | – |
| Arizona | 16 | 23 | (.410) | – | 2 |
| Washington State | 12 | 22 | (.353) | 1 | – |
| Washington | 12 | 23 | (.343) | – | – |
| Utah | 7 | 13 | (.350) | – | 1 |

== Championship game results by team ==
| Appearances | School | Wins | Losses | Last appearance |
|---|---|---|---|---|
| 20 | Stanford | 15 | 5 | 2024 |
| 7 | UCLA | 1 | 6 | 2023 |
| 3 | Oregon | 2 | 1 | 2020 |
| 3 | USC | 2 | 1 | 2024 |
| 3 | Arizona State | 1 | 2 | 2007 |
| 3 | Oregon State | 1 | 2 | 2017 |
| 3 | California | 0 | 3 | 2015 |
| 2 | Arizona | 0 | 2 | 2004 |
| 1 | Washington State | 1 | 0 | 2023 |
| 1 | Utah | 0 | 1 | 2022 |
| 0 | Colorado | 0 | 0 | N/A |
| 0 | Washington | 0 | 0 | N/A |

== Most Outstanding Player by team ==
| School | Total | Year |
|---|---|---|
| Stanford | 16 | 2002, 2003, 2004, 2005, 2007, 2008, 2009, 2010, 2011, 2012, 2013, 2015, 2017, 2019, 2021, 2022 |
| Oregon | 2 | 2018, 2020 |
| USC | 2 | 2014, 2024 |
| Oregon State | 1 | 2016 |
| UCLA | 1 | 2006 |
| Washington State | 1 | 2023 |
| Arizona | 0 | – |
| Arizona State | 0 | – |
| California | 0 | – |
| Colorado | 0 | – |
| Utah | 0 | – |
| Washington | 0 | – |

=== Performance by team ===
| Teams (# of titles) | | **2002** | **2003** | **2004** | **2005** | **2006** | **2007** | **2008** | **2009** | **2010** | **2011** | **2012** | **2013** | **2014** | **2015** | **2016** | **2017** | **2018** | **2019** | **2020** | **2021** | **2022** | **2023** | **2024** |
| **PAC-12** (23) | | **(10)** | **(10)** | **(10)** | **(10)** | **(10)** | **(10)** | **(10)** | **(10)** | **(10)** | **(10)** | **(12)** | **(12)** | **(12)** | **(12)** | **(12)** | **(12)** | **(12)** | **(12)** | **(12)** | **(12)** | **(12)** | **(12)** | **(12)** |
| 1 | Stanford (15) | F | **C** | **C** | **C** | F | **C** | **C** | **C** | **C** | **C** | **C** | **C** | SF | **C** | QF | **C** | F | **C** | F | **C** | **C** | SF | F |
| 2 | Oregon (2) | SF | QF | 1R | SF | 1R | QF | QF | 1R | QF | 1R | 1R | 1R | 1R | 1R | 1R | SF | **C** | F | **C** | QF | SF | QF | 1R |
| 2 | USC (2) | QF | QF | QF | SF | SF | SF | QF | F | SF | QF | QF | QF | **C** | 1R | QF | 1R | QF | 1R | QF | QF | 1R | 1R | **C** |
| 3 | Arizona State (1) | **C** | 1R | QF | F | SF | F | SF | QF | QF | QF | SF | 1R | QF | SF | QF | QF | SF | QF | 1R | 1R | 1R | 1R | 1R |
| 3 | Oregon State (1) | SF | QF | QF | 1R | QF | 1R | QF | QF | QF | 1R | 1R | 1R | F | QF | **C** | F | QF | QF | QF | SF | QF | QF | SF |
| 3 | UCLA (1) | QF | SF | SF | QF | **C** | QF | SF | SF | F | F | 1R | F | 1R | QF | F | SF | SF | SF | SF | F | QF | F | SF |
| 3 | Washington State (1) | 1R | 1R | 1R | 1R | 1R | 1R | 1R | 1R | 1R | QF | SF | QF | SF | QF | 1R | QF | 1R | 1R | 1R | QF | QF | **C** | 1R |
| 6 | Arizona (0) | QF | F | F | QF | QF | QF | 1R | QF | QF | SF | QF | 1R | 1R | 1R | QF | 1R | 1R | QF | SF | SF | QF | QF | QF |
| 6 | California (0) | 1R | QF | QF | QF | QF | SF | F | SF | SF | SF | F | SF | QF | F | SF | QF | QF | QF | QF | 1R | 1R | 1R | QF |
| 6 | Colorado (0) | • | • | • | • | • | • | • | • | • | • | QF | SF | QF | SF | 1R | 1R | QF | 1R | 1R | 1R | SF | SF | QF |
| 6 | Utah (0) | • | • | • | • | • | • | • | • | • | • | 1R | QF | QF | 1R | 1R | 1R | 1R | 1R | QF | 1R | F | QF | QF |
| 6 | Washington (0) | QF | SF | SF | QF | QF | QF | QF | QF | 1R | QF | QF | QF | 1R | QF | SF | QF | 1R | SF | 1R | QF | 1R | 1R | 1R |

Key

| **C** | Champion |
| F | Runner-up |
| SF | Semifinals |
| QF | Quarterfinals |
| RR | Round Number |
| • | Did not participate |

=== Coaches with championships ===
- 15 – **Tara VanDerveer** (Stanford – 2003, 2004, 2005, 2007, 2008, 2009, 2010, 2011, 2012, 2013, 2015, 2017, 2019, 2021, 2022)
- 2 – **Kelly Graves** (Oregon – 2018, 2020)
- 1 – Charli Turner Thorne (Arizona State – 2002)
- 1 – **Scott Rueck** (Oregon State – 2016)
- 1 – Kathy Olivier (UCLA – 2006)
- 1 – Cynthia Cooper-Dyke (USC – 2014)
- 1 – **Kamie Ethridge** (Washington State - 2023)
- 1 – **Lindsay Gottlieb** (USC - 2024)

Note: Coaches with at least one win are listed here. Current coaches are in bold. Source:

=== All-time records by seed ===
As of March 10, 2024

| Seed | Record | Winning Pct | Championships |
|---|---|---|---|
| 1 | 56–8 | (.875) | 15 |
| 2 | 31–20 | (.608) | 3 |
| 3 | 29–20 | (.592) | 3 |
| 4 | 16–23 | (.410) | 0 |
| 5 | 24–22 | (.522) | 1 |
| 6 | 16–24 | (.400) | 0 |
| 7 | 24–22 | (.522) | 1 |
| 8 | 13–24 | (.351) | 0 |
| 9 | 11–23 | (.324) | 0 |
| 10 | 5–24 | (.172) | 0 |
| 11 | 9–13 | (.409) | 0 |
| 12 | 2–14 | (.125) | 0 |

== Pac-12 Women's Tournament records ==
=== Pac-12 Women's Tournament team records ===
- Margin of victory: 41 pts., Oregon (vs. California), (81–40), Mar. 5, 2005
- Most points per game: 107 Washington State, (vs. Oregon) (100), Mar. 6, 2014
- Fewest points per game: 31 Arizona vs. Oregon State, Mar. 7, 2008
- Most points per half: 59 Washington State vs. Oregon (55), Mar. 12, 2008 (1st)
- Fewest points per half: 13 Utah vs. Oregon State (32), Mar. 7, 2014; 13 Washington State vs. Arizona State (18), Mar. 7, 2013
- Most points per tournament: 264 Utah, (4 games) Mar. 2022
- Most field goals per game
  - Team: 44 Stanford, (vs. Arizona) (44-of-75), Mar. 11, 2011
  - Both Teams: 74, Washington State (41) vs. Oregon (33), Mar. 6, 2014
- Most field goal attempts per game
  - Team: 88, Washington State (vs. Oregon), Mar. 6, 2014 (41-of-88)
  - Both Teams, Game: 171, Washington State (88) vs. Oregon (83), Mar. 6, 2014
- Highest Field Goals % per game: 69.0%, California vs. Arizona State, Mar. 4, 2016 (29-of-42)
- Most Assists Per Game: 30, Stanford vs Arizona, Mar. 11, 2011
- Most Steals Per Game: 30, Oregon State (15) vs. Washington (15), Mar. 4, 2005
- Most blocked shots per game: 14, Stanford (8) vs Oregon State (6), Mar. 5, 2017; Colorado (8) vs Washington (6), Mar. 8, 2013; Washington State (9) vs Arizona State (5), Mar. 7, 2013
- Most personal fouls per game (one team): 28, Colorado (vs. Stanford), Mar. 7, 2014
- Highest field goal percentage per game: .690, California vs. Arizona State, Mar. 4, 2016 (29-of-42)
- Lowest field goal percentage per game: .203 Washington State vs. Oregon State, Mar. 3, 2006 (12-of-59)

=== Pac-12 Tournament individual records ===
- Most total points scored in:
  - Half: 27, Nicole Powell, Stanford vs. Oregon State Mar. 3, 2002 (1st)
  - Game: 37, Nicole Powell, Stanford vs. Oregon State Mar. 3, 2002
  - Tournament: 75, Lia Galdiera, Washington State, 2014 (3 games)
- Most field goals per :
  - Game: 15, Kelsey Plum, Washington vs. Oregon, Mar. 3, 2017 (15-of-33)
  - 15, Nnemkadi Ogwumike, Stanford vs. Arizona, Mar. 11, 2011 (15-of-22)
  - Tournament: 27, Nnemkadi Ogwumike, Stanford, 2011 (3 games)
- Most field goal attempts per:
  - Game: 33, Kelsey Plum, Washington vs. Oregon, Mar. 3, 2017 (15-of-33)
  - Tournament: 63, Sabrina Ionescu, Oregon, 2019 (22-of-63), 3 games)
- Field goal percentage per:
  - Game (min 6 made): 1.000 Jayne Appel, Stanford vs. Oregon State, Mar. 8, 2008 (8-of-8)
  - Tournament (min 6 made/2 gms): .778, Sophia Elenga, Arizona State, 2019 (7-of-9, 2 games); .778, Toni Kokenis, Stanford, 2011 (7-of-9, 2 games); .778, Jamie Funn, USC, 2007 (7-of-9, 2 games)
- Game: Most 3-pt. FGs made
  - 8 Candice Wiggins, Stanford vs. USC, Mar. 4, 2007 (8-of-9)
- Highest 3-pt. FG % (min. 5 made/2 games)
  - Game: 1.000, Brynna Maxwell, Utah vs. Washington, Mar. 5, 2020 (5-of-5); 1.000, Lexy Kresl, Colorado vs. Oregon State, Mar. 6, 2015 (5-of-5); 1.000, Kiki Williams, California vs. Oregon, Mar. 5, 2004 (5-of-5)
- Most total rebounds per :
  - Game: 27, Chantel, Osahor, Washington vs. Oregon, Mar. 3, 2017
  - Tournament: 50, Chiney Ogwumike, Stanford, 2013 (3 games)
- Most steals per :
  - Game: 8 Nikki Blue, UCLA vs. Oregon, Mar. 8, 2003
  - Tournament: 19, Lisa Willis, UCLA, 2006 (3 games)
- Most blocks per:
  - Game: 7, Ruth Hamblin, Oregon State vs. Washington State, Mar. 8, 2014
  - Tournament: 18, Ruth Hamblin, Oregon State, 2014 (3 games)

=== Pac-12 Tournament final game team records ===
- Most total points scored in a final game: 161 (UCLA 85, Stanford 76 OT) (2006)

== See also ==
- Pac-12 Conference men's basketball tournament
