= 2023–24 Cal State Northridge Matadors women's basketball team =

American college basketball season

2023–24 Cal State Northridge Matadors women's basketball
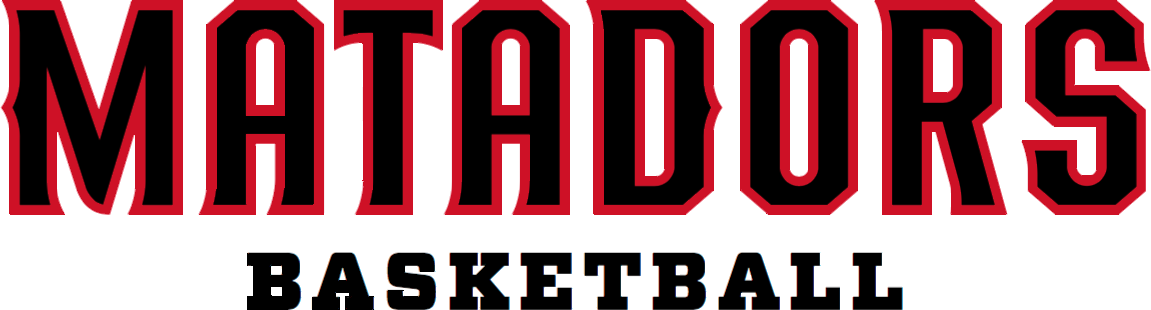
- Conference: Big West Conference
- Record: 3–27 (1–19 Big West)
- Head coach: Carlene Mitchell (3rd season)
- Assistant coaches: Trevor Olson; Kiyae' White; Advit Raghavan
- Home arena: Premier America Credit Union Arena

2023–24 Big West women's basketball standings
	Conf.				Overall
Team	W		L	PCT	W		L	PCT
Hawai'i	17	–	3	.850	20	–	12	.625
UC Irvine †	16	–	4	.800	23	–	9	.719
UC Riverside	13	–	7	.650	18	–	14	.563
Cal Poly	13	–	7	.650	17	–	14	.548
UC Davis	13	–	7	.650	20	–	14	.588
UC Santa Barbara	10	–	10	.500	16	–	15	.516
UC San Diego*	8	–	12	.400	12	–	19	.387
Long Beach State	8	–	12	.400	15	–	18	.455
Cal State Fullerton	6	–	14	.300	10	–	21	.323
Cal State Bakersfield	5	–	15	.250	8	–	21	.276
Cal State Northridge	1	–	19	.050	3	–	27	.100
† 2024 Big West tournament winner * ineligible for the 2024 NCAA tournament due to transition period

The 2023–24 Cal State Northridge Matadors women's basketball team represented California State University, Northridge during the 2023–24 NCAA Division I women's basketball season. The Matadors, led by third-year head coach Carlene Mitchell, played their home games at the Premier America Credit Union Arena in Northridge, California as members of the Big West Conference.

The Matadors finished the season 3–27, 1–19 in Big West play, to finish in last place. Since only the top eight teams in the conference participate, the Matadors failed to qualify for the Big West tournament.

== Previous season ==
The Matadors finished the 2022–23 season 7–24, 6–14 in Big West play, to finish in a tie for ninth place. As the #8 seed in the Big West tournament, they were defeated by #9 seed Cal State Bakersfield in the first round.

== Roster ==
2023–24 Cal State Northridge Matadors women's basketball team
Players
Coaches

Pos.	#	Name	Height	Year	Previous school	Hometown
G	1	Amiyah Ferguson	5 ft 8 in (1.73 m)	Fr	Timberland High School	St. Stephen, SC
G	4	Rachel Harvey	5 ft 7 in (1.7 m)	RS Jr	St. Ignatius College Prep	San Francisco, CA
G	5	Jordan Hayden	5 ft 6 in (1.68 m)	Fr	Agoura High School	Moorpark, CA
F	10	Alondra Lizama	5 ft 10 in (1.78 m)	Fr	Bishop Alemany High School	North Hollywood, CA
F	11	Olivia Smith	6 ft 1 in (1.85 m)	GS	Bishop Gorman High School	Las Vegas, NV
C	13	Rochelle Fourie	6 ft 3 in (1.91 m)	GS	Manukura School	Palmerston North, New Zealand
F	15	Laney Amundsen	6 ft 1 in (1.85 m)	RS Jr	Fresno City College	Fresno, CA
G	20	Erica Adams	5 ft 10 in (1.78 m)	RS Jr	Pacific	Oakland, CA
F	21	Ana Carolina De Jesus	6 ft 3 in (1.91 m)	RS Jr	Eastern Florida State College	Setúbal, Portugal
G	22	Kaitlyn Elsholz	5 ft 11 in (1.8 m)	Fr	Sandra Day O'Connor High School	Peoria, AZ
F	23	Talo Li-Uperesa	5 ft 11 in (1.8 m)	RS Jr	City College of San Francisco	San Francisco, CA
F	24	Kayanna Spriggs	6 ft 2 in (1.88 m)	Jr	Mater Dei Catholic High School	San Diego, CA
C	43	Arina Nikishina	6 ft 6 in (1.98 m)	Sr	Kursk State	Saint Petersburg, Russia

Head coach

- Carlene Mitchell (Kansas State)

Assistant coach(es)

- Trevor Olson (Henderson State)
- Kiyae' White (Auburn)
- Advit Raghavan (Puget Sound)

Legend

- (C) Team captain
- (S) Suspended
- (I) Ineligible
- (W) Walk-on
- Injured
- Current redshirt

Roster
Last update: January 19, 2024

== Schedule and results ==
Date time, TV	Rank^{#}	Opponent^{#}	Result	Record	High points	High rebounds	High assists	Site (attendance) city, state
Non-conference regular season
November 6, 2023*; 6:00 p.m., ESPN+		Utah State	W 79–64	1–0	18 – 2 tied	7 – 2 tied	6 – Ferguson	Premier America Credit Union Arena (386); Northridge, CA
November 9, 2023*; 6:00 p.m., ESPN+		Seattle	W 81–72 ^{OT}	2–0	22 – Elsholz	7 – 2 tied	4 – 2 tied	Premier America Credit Union Arena (227); Northridge, CA
November 14, 2023*; 6:00 p.m., ESPN+		at Santa Clara	L 39–71	2–1	7 – 2 tied	10 – Spriggs	5 – Ferguson	Leavey Center (198); Santa Clara, CA
November 18, 2023*; 12:00 p.m., ESPN+		Hope International	L 60–64	2–2	15 – Ferguson	12 – Spriggs	6 – Spriggs	Premier America Credit Union Arena (185); Northridge, CA
November 22, 2023*; 5:00 p.m., B1G+		at Minnesota	L 31–84	2–3	12 – Spriggs	8 – Spriggs	3 – 2 tied	Williams Arena (2,728); Minneapolis, MN
December 2, 2023*; 2:00 p.m., ESPN+		at Sacramento State	L 48–58	2–4	13 – Adams	9 – Spriggs	3 – Elsholz	Hornets Nest (304); Sacramento, CA
December 7, 2023*; 7:00 p.m., P12N		at No. 2 UCLA	L 48–111	2–5	21 – Ferguson	3 – 3 tied	3 – Lizama	Pauley Pavilion (2,493); Los Angeles, CA
December 10, 2023*; 2:00 p.m., ESPN+		San Diego	L 61–85	2–6	13 – Elsholz	3 – 2 tied	4 – Ferguson	Premier America Credit Union Arena (244); Northridge, CA
December 18, 2023*; 12:00 p.m., ESPN+		San Jose State	L 53–70	2–7	17 – Elsholz	6 – Li-Uperesa	4 – Ferguson	Premier America Credit Union Arena (149); Northridge, CA
December 21, 2023*; 1:00 p.m., ESPN+		Loyola Marymount	L 74–77	2–8	18 – Li-Uperesa	6 – Li-Uperesa	5 – Adams	Premier America Credit Union Arena (135); Northridge, CA
Big West regular season
December 28, 2023; 6:00 p.m., ESPN+		Cal Poly	L 43–68	2–9 (0–1)	16 – Ferguson	5 – Spriggs	2 – 3 tied	Premier America Credit Union Arena (161); Northridge, CA
December 30, 2023; 2:00 p.m., ESPN+		Long Beach State	L 58–76	2–10 (0–2)	18 – Spriggs	8 – 2 tied	4 – Adams	Premier America Credit Union Arena (159); Northridge, CA
January 6, 2024; 9:00 p.m., ESPN+		at Hawaii	L 38–67	2–11 (0–3)	8 – Li-Uperesa	9 – Spriggs	2 – De Jesus	Stan Sheriff Center (1,580); Honolulu, HI
January 11, 2024; 6:00 p.m., ESPN+		UC Davis	L 45–55	2–12 (0–4)	11 – Spriggs	9 – Spriggs	2 – 2 tied	Premier America Credit Union Arena (150); Northridge, CA
January 13, 2024; 6:00 p.m., ESPN+		at Cal State Fullerton	L 62–68	2–13 (0–5)	17 – Spriggs	10 – Spriggs	3 – 2 tied	Titan Gym (189); Fullerton, CA
January 18, 2024; 7:00 p.m., ESPN+		at UC Santa Barbara	L 41–70	2–14 (0–6)	14 – Ferguson	7 – Spriggs	2 – 2 tied	The Thunderdome (551); Santa Barbara, CA
January 20, 2024; 2:00 p.m., ESPN+		UC Riverside	L 46–57	2–15 (0–7)	18 – Spriggs	12 – Spriggs	3 – Harvey	Premier America Credit Union Arena (131); Northridge, CA
January 25, 2024; 7:00 p.m., ESPN+		at Cal State Bakersfield	L 54–70	2–16 (0–8)	11 – Spriggs	8 – Li-Uperesa	3 – Spriggs	Icardo Center (691); Bakersfield, CA
January 27, 2024; 2:00 p.m., ESPN+		UC Irvine	L 63–67	2–17 (0–9)	12 – De Jesus	6 – Li-Uperesa	6 – Adams	Premier America Credit Union Arena; Northridge, CA
February 1, 2024; 6:00 p.m., ESPN+		UC San Diego	L 52–53	2–18 (0–10)	11 – Adams	10 – De Jesus	4 – Adams	Premier America Credit Union Arena (320); Northridge, CA
February 3, 2024; 6:00 p.m., ESPN+		at UC Riverside	L 46–70	2–19 (0–11)	13 – Li-Uperesa	8 – 2 tied	2 – 2 tied	SRC Arena (310); Riverside, CA
February 8, 2024; 6:00 p.m., ESPN+		at Cal Poly	L 68–75	2–20 (0–12)	14 – Spriggs	6 – 2 tied	3 – Adams	Mott Athletics Center (884); San Luis Obispo, CA
February 10, 2024; 2:00 p.m., ESPN+		UC Santa Barbara	L 60–64	2–21 (0–13)	21 – Elsholz	9 – Spriggs	4 – Ferguson	Premier America Credit Union Arena (153); Northridge, CA
February 15, 2024; 6:00 p.m., ESPN+		Cal State Bakersfield	L 50–61	2–22 (0–14)	15 – Spriggs	16 – Spriggs	3 – 2 tied	Premier America Credit Union Arena (228); Northridge, CA
February 17, 2024; 3:00 p.m., ESPN+		at Long Beach State	L 62–86	2–23 (0–15)	15 – Adams	17 – Spriggs	2 – 4 tied	Walter Pyramid (1,002); Long Beach, CA
February 22, 2024; 6:00 p.m., ESPN+		at UC Davis	L 54–58	2–24 (0–16)	12 – 2 tied	10 – Spriggs	3 – Adams	University Credit Union Center (778); Davis, CA
February 24, 2024; 2:00 p.m., ESPN+		Cal State Fullerton	L 57–75	2–25 (0–17)	12 – Spriggs	7 – Amundsen	4 – Adams	Premier America Credit Union Arena (231); Northridge, CA
February 29, 2024; 6:00 p.m., ESPN+		at UC Irvine	L 54–64	2–26 (0–18)	11 – Li-Uperesa	9 – Spriggs	3 – Amundsen	Bren Events Center (524); Irvine, CA
March 2, 2024; 2:00 p.m., ESPN+		at UC San Diego	W 66–64 ^{OT}	3–26 (1–18)	14 – 2 tied	16 – Spriggs	3 – 2 tied	LionTree Arena (341); La Jolla, CA
March 7, 2024; 6:00 p.m., ESPN+		Hawaii	L 62–65	3–27 (1–19)	18 – Li-Uperesa	7 – 2 tied	2 – 2 tied	Premier America Credit Union Arena (175); Northridge, CA
*Non-conference game. ^{#}Rankings from AP poll. (#) Tournament seedings in parentheses. All times are in Pacific.
