= 2023–24 UC Riverside Highlanders women's basketball team =

American college basketball season

2023–24 UC Riverside Highlanders women's basketball

WNIT, first round
- Conference: Big West Conference
- Record: 18–14 (13–7 Big West)
- Head coach: Brad Langston interim (1st season)
- Assistant coaches: Sean LeBeauf; Raina Perez; Jewelyn Sawyer
- Home arena: SRC Arena

2023–24 Big West women's basketball standings
	Conf.				Overall
Team	W		L	PCT	W		L	PCT
Hawai'i	17	–	3	.850	20	–	12	.625
UC Irvine †	16	–	4	.800	23	–	9	.719
UC Riverside	13	–	7	.650	18	–	14	.563
Cal Poly	13	–	7	.650	17	–	14	.548
UC Davis	13	–	7	.650	20	–	14	.588
UC Santa Barbara	10	–	10	.500	16	–	15	.516
UC San Diego*	8	–	12	.400	12	–	19	.387
Long Beach State	8	–	12	.400	15	–	18	.455
Cal State Fullerton	6	–	14	.300	10	–	21	.323
Cal State Bakersfield	5	–	15	.250	8	–	21	.276
Cal State Northridge	1	–	19	.050	3	–	27	.100
† 2024 Big West tournament winner * ineligible for the 2024 NCAA tournament due to transition period

The 2023–24 UC Riverside Highlanders women's basketball team represented the University of California, Riverside during the 2023–24 NCAA Division I women's basketball season. The Highlanders, led by interim first-year head coach Brad Langston, played their home games at the SRC Arena in Riverside, California, as members of the Big West Conference.

== Previous season ==
The Highlanders finished the 2022–23 season 6–26, 3–17 in Big West play, to finish in a tie for last (10th) place. As the #10 seed in the Big West tournament, they upset #7 seed Cal Poly in the first round, before falling to #2 seed Long Beach State in the quarterfinals.

== Roster ==
2023–24 UC Riverside Highlanders women's basketball team
Players
Coaches

Pos.	#	Name	Height	Year	Previous school	Hometown
G	0	Makayla Jackson	5 ft 7 in (1.7 m)	So	Stanislaus State	Roseville, CA
F	1	Matehya Bryant	6 ft 0 in (1.83 m)	RS Sr	Grand Canyon	Sammamish, WA
G	2	RyAnne Walters	5 ft 7 in (1.7 m)	Sr	UC Santa Barbara	Sacramento, CA
G	3	Zoe Tillery	5 ft 8 in (1.73 m)	So	Laguna Creek High School	Sacramento, CA
G	4	Jordyn Marshall	5 ft 6 in (1.68 m)	So	Manvel High School	Pearland, TX
G	5	Sasha Murphy	5 ft 10 in (1.78 m)	Fr	Rolling Hills Prep	Culver City, CA
G	10	Julia Stenberg	5 ft 10 in (1.78 m)	Sr	Otero College	Stockholm, Sweden
F	11	Esther Matarranz	6 ft 2 in (1.88 m)	Jr	Perfumerias Avenida	Barcelona, Spain
F	12	Sierra Logue	6 ft 3 in (1.91 m)	So	South Medford High School	Medford, OR
G	13	Maya Chocano	6 ft 1 in (1.85 m)	Fr	King's Christian Collegiate	Toronto, ON
G	15	Jaden Sanderson	5 ft 10 in (1.78 m)	Jr	Long Beach City College	Torrance, CA
G	23	India Aikins	5 ft 10 in (1.78 m)	Sr	Lord Tweedsmuir Secondary School	Vancouver, BC
G	32	Jordan Webster	5 ft 10 in (1.78 m)	Sr	Prestonwood Christian Academy	Dallas, TX

Head coach

- Brad Langston (San José State) interim

Assistant coach(es)

- Sean LeBeauf (Montevallo)
- Raina Perez (NC State)
- Jewelyn Sawyer (Long Beach State)

Legend

- (C) Team captain
- (S) Suspended
- (I) Ineligible
- (W) Walk-on
- Injured
- Current redshirt

Roster
Last update: January 18, 2024

== Schedule and results ==
Date time, TV	Rank^{#}	Opponent^{#}	Result	Record	High points	High rebounds	High assists	Site (attendance) city, state
Non-conference regular season
November 6, 2023*; 2:00 p.m., ESPN+		at SMU	L 55–78	0–1	24 – Webster	11 – Bryant	7 – Walters	Moody Coliseum (541); University Park, TX
November 9, 2023*; 7:00 p.m., P12N		at No. 4 UCLA	L 52–90	0–2	18 – Webster	8 – Bryant	6 – 2 tied	Pauley Pavilion (1,431); Los Angeles, CA
November 15, 2023*; 5:30 p.m., MWN		at Boise State	L 55–63	0–3	17 – Webster	9 – Bryant	6 – Walters	ExtraMile Arena (689); Boise, ID
November 18, 2023*; 6:00 p.m., ESPN+		Antelope Valley	W 69–47	1–3	16 – Webster	7 – Bryant	5 – Walters	SRC Arena (117); Riverside, CA
November 22, 2023*; 4:00 p.m., ESPN+		Utah State	W 52–51	2–3	21 – Bryant	15 – Bryant	4 – Bryant	SRC Arena (97); Riverside, CA
December 1, 2023*; 8:00 a.m., NEC Front Row		at Merrimack	W 65–53	3–3	20 – Tillery	9 – Bryant	3 – Tillery	Hammel Court (296); North Andover, MA
December 4, 2023*; 11:00 a.m., ESPN+		at Dartmouth	W 57–38	4–3	18 – Jackson	7 – 2 tied	4 – Tillery	Leede Arena (305); Hanover, NH
December 10, 2023*; 4:00 p.m., P12N		at No. 6 USC	L 53–85	4–4	20 – Webster	4 – Bryant	4 – Webster	Galen Center (4,201); Los Angeles, CA
December 19, 2023*; 6:00 p.m., ESPN+		Santa Clara	L 46–76	4–5	16 – Webster	6 – Bryant	4 – Tillery	SRC Arena (113); Riverside, CA
December 20, 2023*; 6:00 p.m., ESPN+		Cal Lutheran	W 82–49	5–5	17 – Webster	8 – Bryant	8 – Marshall	SRC Arena (83); Riverside, CA
Big West regular season
December 28, 2023; 6:00 p.m., ESPN+		UC Irvine	L 52–67	5–6 (0–1)	19 – Webster	9 – Webster	4 – Jackson	SRC Arena (137); Riverside, CA
December 30, 2023; 4:00 p.m., ESPN+		at UC Santa Barbara	L 56–64	5–7 (0–2)	13 – Bryant	13 – Bryant	2 – Bryant	The Thunderdome (422); Santa Barbara, CA
January 4, 2024; 6:00 p.m., ESPN+		at UC Davis	L 59–63	5–8 (0–3)	21 – Jackson	6 – 2 tied	6 – Walters	University Credit Union Center (602); Davis, CA
January 6, 2024; 6:00 p.m., ESPN+		Long Beach State	W 49–43	6–8 (1–3)	27 – Webster	8 – Bryant	3 – Walters	SRC Arena (121); Riverside, CA
January 11, 2024; 6:00 p.m., ESPN+		at Cal Poly	W 64–53	7–8 (2–3)	21 – Webster	6 – 2 tied	2 – 2 tied	Mott Athletics Center (752); San Luis Obispo, CA
January 13, 2024; 6:00 p.m., ESPN+		Hawaii	W 66–58	8–8 (3–3)	28 – Webster	10 – Bryant	6 – Bryant	SRC Arena (137); Riverside, CA
January 18, 2024; 6:00 p.m., ESPN+		Cal State Bakersfield	W 64–62	9–8 (4–3)	31 – Webster	10 – Webster	2 – 2 tied	SRC Arena (122); Riverside, CA
January 20, 2024; 2:00 p.m., ESPN+		at Cal State Northridge	W 57–46	10–8 (5–3)	27 – Webster	8 – Bryant	3 – Webster	Premier America Credit Union Arena (131); Northridge, CA
January 25, 2024; 6:00 p.m., ESPN+		UC San Diego	L 43–51	10–9 (5–4)	17 – Bryant	17 – Bryant	2 – 2 tied	SRC Arena (121); Riverside, CA
January 27, 2024; 3:00 p.m., ESPN+		at Long Beach State	L 52–54	10–10 (5–5)	19 – Webster	12 – Bryant	3 – Jackson	Walter Pyramid (775); Long Beach, CA
February 3, 2024; 6:00 p.m., ESPN+		Cal State Northridge	W 70–46	11–10 (6–5)	20 – Bryant	7 – Webster	6 – 2 tied	SRC Arena (310); Riverside, CA
February 8, 2024; 11:00 a.m., ESPN+		at Cal State Bakersfield	W 54–48	12–10 (7–5)	24 – Webster	7 – Webster	4 – Walters	Icardo Center (2,894); Bakersfield, CA
February 10, 2024; 2:00 p.m., ESPN+		at UC Irvine	L 53–62	12–11 (7–6)	16 – Webster	8 – Bryant	5 – Matarranz	Bren Events Center (789); Irvine, CA
February 15, 2024; 6:00 p.m., ESPN+		Cal State Fullerton	W 67-56	13–11 (8–6)	18 – Webster	8 – Matarranz	3 – 2 tied	SRC Arena (149); Riverside, CA
February 17, 2024; 2:00 p.m., ESPN+		UC Davis	W 50–41	14–11 (9–6)	12 – Webster	10 – Bryant	3 – Walters	SRC Arena (123); Riverside, CA
February 22, 2024; 7:00 p.m., ESPN+		at UC San Diego	W 63–48	15–11 (10–6)	23 – Webster	7 – Bryant	6 – Matarranz	LionTree Arena (471); La Jolla, CA
February 24, 2024; 6:00 p.m., ESPN+		Cal Poly	W 62–60 ^{OT}	16–11 (10–6)	16 – Matarranz	4 – Bryant	6 – Bryant	SRC Arena (157); Riverside, CA
March 2, 2024; 9:00 p.m., ESPN+		at Hawaii	L 51–62	16–12 (11–7)	20 – Jackson	7 – Jackson	3 – Walters	Stan Sheriff Center (4,204); Honolulu, HI
March 7, 2024; 7:00 p.m., ESPN+		at Cal State Fullerton	W 65–50	17–12 (12–7)	18 – Bryant	13 – Bryant	5 – Walters	Titan Gym (288); Fullerton, CA
March 9, 2024; 6:00 p.m., ESPN+		UC Santa Barbara	W 53-46	18–12 (13–7)	14 – Bryant	8 – Bryant	4 – Walters	SRC Arena; Riverside, CA
Big West tournament
March 14, 2024; 12:00 p.m., ESPN+	(3)	vs. (7) Long Beach State; Quarterfinals	L 75–83 ^{OT}	18–13	25 – Jackson	15 – Webster	3 – 2 tied	Dollar Loan Center (580); Henderson, NV
WNIT
March 22, 2024*; 5:00 p.m., SLN		at South Dakota; First Round	L 57–72	18–14	19 – Webster	8 – Bryant	3 – Bryant	Sanford Coyote Sports Center (1,465); Vermillion, SD
*Non-conference game. ^{#}Rankings from AP poll. (#) Tournament seedings in parentheses. All times are in Pacific.
