= 2023–24 UC Santa Barbara Gauchos women's basketball team =

American college basketball season

2023–24 UC Santa Barbara Gauchos women's basketball
- Conference: Big West Conference
- Record: 16–15 (10–10 Big West)
- Head coach: Bonnie Henrickson (9th season)
- Assistant coaches: Nate Fripp; Krystle Evans; DeNesha Stallworth
- Home arena: The Thunderdome

2023–24 Big West women's basketball standings
	Conf.				Overall
Team	W		L	PCT	W		L	PCT
Hawai'i	17	–	3	.850	20	–	12	.625
UC Irvine †	16	–	4	.800	23	–	9	.719
UC Riverside	13	–	7	.650	18	–	14	.563
Cal Poly	13	–	7	.650	17	–	14	.548
UC Davis	13	–	7	.650	20	–	14	.588
UC Santa Barbara	10	–	10	.500	16	–	15	.516
UC San Diego*	8	–	12	.400	12	–	19	.387
Long Beach State	8	–	12	.400	15	–	18	.455
Cal State Fullerton	6	–	14	.300	10	–	21	.323
Cal State Bakersfield	5	–	15	.250	8	–	21	.276
Cal State Northridge	1	–	19	.050	3	–	27	.100
† 2024 Big West tournament winner * ineligible for the 2024 NCAA tournament due to transition period

The 2023–24 UC Santa Barbara Gauchos women's basketball team represented the University of California, Santa Barbara during the 2023–24 NCAA Division I women's basketball season. The Gauchos, led by ninth-year head coach Bonnie Henrickson, played their home games at The Thunderdome in Santa Barbara, California as members of the Big West Conference.

The Gauchos finished the season 16–15, 10–10 in Big West play, to finish in sixth place. They were defeated by Long Beach State in the first round of the Big West tournament.

On March 20, 2024, head coach Bonnie Henrickson announced that she would be retiring, ending her lengthy coaching career, after leading the Gauchos for nine seasons. On April 17, it was announced that Cal State San Marcos head coach Renee Jimenez would be stepping down from her position in order to take the head coaching position at UC Santa Barbara.

== Previous season ==
The Gauchos finished the 2022–23 season 21–12, 12–8 in Big West play, to finish in fifth place. As the #5 seed in the Big West tournament, they defeated #4 seed UC Davis in the quarterfinals and #9 seed Cal State Bakersfield in the semifinals before falling to #3 seed Hawaii in the championship game.

== Roster ==
2023–24 UC Santa Barbara Gauchos women's basketball team
Players
Coaches

Pos.	#	Name	Height	Year	Previous school	Hometown
F	2	Zoe Borter	6 ft 0 in (1.83 m)	Fr	Beaverton High School	Beaverton, OR
G	3	Alyssa Marin	5 ft 9 in (1.75 m)	Sr	Camarillo High School	Camarillo, CA
G	4	Kathleen Hutchens	5 ft 9 in (1.75 m)	Jr	Arroyo Grande High School	Arroyo Grande, CA
F	5	Olivia Bradley	6 ft 1 in (1.85 m)	Fr	Urrbrae Agricultural High School	Adelaide, South Australia
G	10	Anya Choice	5 ft 8 in (1.73 m)	Sr	Cardinal Newman High School	Santa Rosa, CA
F	11	Cayla Williams	6 ft 2 in (1.88 m)	Jr	Richmond	Vienna, VA
C	13	Flora Goed	6 ft 4 in (1.93 m)	Jr	Casper College	Vienna, Austria
G	11	Kanani Coon	6 ft 2 in (1.88 m)	Fr	Okanagan Mission Secondary School	Kelowna, BC
G	15	Mary McMorris	5 ft 6 in (1.68 m)	So	Northern Arizona	Las Vegas, NV
C	20	Laurel Rockwood	6 ft 4 in (1.93 m)	Jr	Foothill High School	Henderson, NV
F	23	Alexis Whitfield	6 ft 2 in (1.88 m)	Sr	Washington	West Hills, CA
F	25	Analillia Cabuena	6 ft 2 in (1.88 m)	Jr	Lincoln High School	Stockton, CA
G	32	Jessica Grant	5 ft 8 in (1.73 m)	So	Mission Hills High School	San Marcos, CA
G	55	Skylar Burke	5 ft 8 in (1.73 m)	So	Coeur d'Alene High School	Coeur d'Alene, ID

Head coach

- Bonnie Henrickson (St. Cloud State)

Assistant coach(es)

- Nate Fripp (BYU–Hawaii)
- Krystle Evans (UCLA)
- DeNesha Stallworth (Kentucky)

Legend

- (C) Team captain
- (S) Suspended
- (I) Ineligible
- (W) Walk-on
- Injured
- Current redshirt

Roster
Last update: January 13, 2024

== Schedule and results ==
Date time, TV	Rank^{#}	Opponent^{#}	Result	Record	High points	High rebounds	High assists	Site (attendance) city, state
Non-conference regular season
November 7, 2023*; 7:00 p.m., ESPN+		San Francisco	W 87–75	1–0	22 – Whitfield	12 – Whitfield	7 – Marin	The Thunderdome (428); Santa Barbara, CA
November 15, 2023*; 6:00 p.m., ESPN+		at Idaho State	L 64–70	1–1	19 – Whitfield	7 – Whitfield	3 – 2 tied	Reed Gym (823); Pocatello, ID
November 19, 2023*; 2:00 p.m., ESPN+		Southern Utah	W 71–61	2–1	23 – Whitfield	10 – Whitfield	7 – Marin	The Thunderdome (381); Santa Barbara, CA
November 24, 2023*; 4:00 p.m., ESPN+		vs. UNLV; The Dana on Mission Bay Thanksgiving Classic	L 49–68	2–2	12 – Choice	6 – Burke	2 – Choice	Jenny Craig Pavilion (161); San Diego, CA
November 25, 2023*; 2:00 p.m., ESPN+		vs. Weber State; The Dana on Mission Bay Thanksgiving Classic	W 61–51	3–2	20 – McMorris	7 – 3 tied	5 – Marin	Jenny Craig Pavilion (221); San Diego, CA
November 28, 2023*; 7:00 p.m., ESPN+		UC Santa Cruz	W 87–46	4–2	14 – Rockwood	9 – Whitfield	6 – McMorris	The Thunderdome (302); Santa Barbara, CA
December 2, 2023*; 1:00 p.m., MWN		at Nevada	W 73–66 ^{OT}	5–2	22 – Marin	11 – Whitfield	4 – 2 tied	Lawlor Events Center (1,258); Reno, NV
December 8, 2023*; 6:00 p.m., ESPN+		at Pacific	L 61–72	5–3	20 – Whitfield	10 – Whitfield	3 – McMorris	Alex G. Spanos Center (524); Stockton, CA
December 17, 2023*; 4:00 p.m., ESPN+		Loyola Marymount	L 57–64	5–4	21 – Whitfield	9 – Whitfield	3 – 2 tied	The Thunderdome (424); Santa Barbara, CA
December 20, 2023*; 2:00 p.m., ESPN+		Life Pacific	W 107–53	6–4	17 – Bradley	6 – McMorris	7 – Marin	The Thunderdome (304); Santa Barbara, CA
Big West regular season
December 28, 2023; 7:00 p.m., ESPN+		UC Davis	W 60–49	7–4 (1–0)	13 – Marin	12 – Whitfield	3 – 2 tied	The Thunderdome (513); Santa Barbara, CA
December 30, 2023; 4:00 p.m., ESPN+		UC Riverside	W 64–56	8–4 (2–0)	16 – Whitfield	9 – Whitfield	6 – Choice	The Thunderdome (422); Santa Barbara, CA
January 4, 2024; 7:00 p.m., ESPN+		at UC San Diego	L 50–64	8–5 (2–1)	11 – Choice	10 – Whitfield	2 – 2 tied	LionTree Arena (311); La Jolla, CA
January 6, 2024; 4:00 p.m., ESPN+		Cal Poly	W 65–64 ^{OT}	9–5 (3–1)	19 – 2 tied	9 – Whitfield	5 – Marin	The Thunderdome (606); Santa Barbara, CA
January 11, 2024; 7:00 p.m., ESPN+		at Cal State Bakersfield	W 75–54	10–5 (4–1)	20 – Whitfield	8 – 2 tied	4 – Whitfield	Icardo Center (387); Bakersfield, CA
January 13, 2024; 3:00 p.m., ESPN+		at Long Beach State	W 69–56	11–5 (5–1)	25 – Marin	9 – 2 tied	6 – Burke	Walter Pyramid (853); Long Beach, CA
January 18, 2024; 7:00 p.m., ESPN+		Cal State Northridge	W 70–41	12–5 (6–1)	14 – 2 tied	13 – Burke	6 – Choice	The Thunderdome (551); Santa Barbara, CA
January 20, 2024; 6:00 p.m., ESPN+		at Cal State Fullerton	L 67–80	12–6 (6–2)	22 – Marin	13 – Burke	3 – Burke	Titan Gym (192); Fullerton, CA
January 25, 2024; 7:00 p.m., ESPN+		Hawaii	W 65–53	13–6 (7–2)	23 – Whitfield	19 – Whitfield	3 – 3 tied	The Thunderdome (699); Santa Barbara, CA
February 1, 2024; 6:00 p.m., ESPN+		at UC Davis	L 62–82	13–7 (7–3)	31 – Marin	11 – Whitfield	4 – Whitfield	University Credit Union Center (636); Davis, CA
February 3, 2024; 1:00 p.m., SPECTSN/ESPN+		Cal State Bakersfield	W 57–55	14–7 (8–3)	19 – Burke	18 – Whitfield	3 – 2 tied	The Thunderdome (788); Santa Barbara, CA
February 8, 2024; 6:00 p.m., ESPN+		at UC Irvine	L 38–60	14–8 (8–4)	10 – Grant	8 – 2 tied	2 – 2 tied	Bren Events Center (643); Irvine, CA
February 10, 2024; 2:00 p.m., ESPN+		at Cal State Northridge	W 64–60	15–8 (9–4)	17 – Grant	8 – Whitfield	8 – McMorris	Premier America Credit Union Arena (153); Northridge, CA
February 15, 2024; 7:00 p.m., ESPN+		UC San Diego	W 60–52	16–8 (10–4)	19 – Whitfield	9 – Rockwood	5 – Choice	The Thunderdome (562); Santa Barbara, CA
February 17, 2024; 9:00 p.m., ESPN+		at Hawaii	L 64–68	16–9 (10–5)	21 – Whitfield	17 – Whitfield	3 – 2 tied	Stan Sheriff Center (5,068); Honolulu, HI
February 22, 2024; 7:00 p.m., ESPN+		UC Irvine	L 46–54	16–10 (10–6)	10 – Goed	12 – Whitfield	7 – Whitfield	The Thunderdome (782); Santa Barbara, CA
February 29, 2024; 6:00 p.m., ESPN+		at Cal Poly	L 64–73	16–11 (10–7)	21 – Whitfield	9 – Whitfield	4 – Marin	Mott Athletics Center (1,352); San Luis Obispo, CA
March 2, 2024; 4:00 p.m., ESPN+		Cal State Fullerton	L 65–78	16–12 (10–8)	19 – Marin	10 – Whitfield	5 – Choice	The Thunderdome (771); Santa Barbara, CA
March 7, 2024; 7:00 p.m., ESPN+		Long Beach State	L 69–75	16–13 (10–9)	27 – Whitfield	5 – 2 tied	3 – 4 tied	The Thunderdome (678); Santa Barbara, CA
March 9, 2024; 6:00 p.m., ESPN+		at UC Riverside	L 46–53	16–14 (10–10)	10 – Burke	11 – Burke	4 – Whitfield	SRC Arena; Riverside, CA
Big West tournament
March 13, 2024; 2:30 p.m., ESPN+	(6)	vs. (7) Long Beach State; First round	L 75–90	16–15	30 – Whitfield	17 – Whitfield	8 – 2 tied	Dollar Loan Center (557); Henderson, NV
*Non-conference game. ^{#}Rankings from AP poll. (#) Tournament seedings in parentheses. All times are in Pacific.
