= 2023–24 Cal State Bakersfield Roadrunners women's basketball team =

American college basketball season

2023–24 Cal State Bakersfield Roadrunners women's basketball
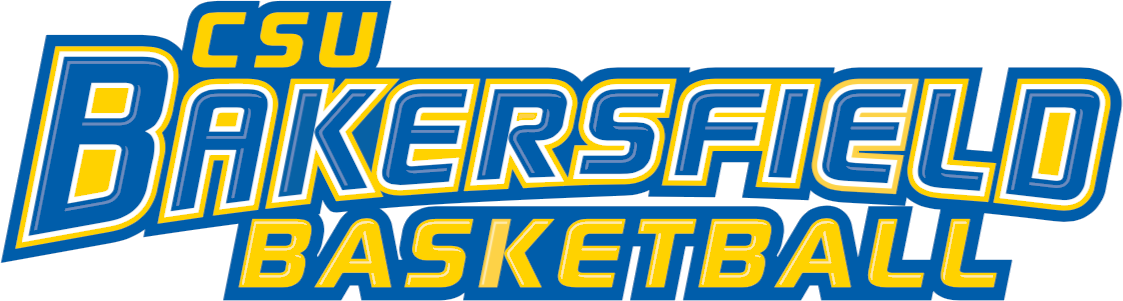
- Conference: Big West Conference
- Record: 8–21 (5–15 Big West)
- Head coach: Greg McCall (13th season)
- Associate head coach: Xavier Johnson
- Assistant coaches: Zack Grasmick; Grant Bingham; Jasmin Dixon
- Home arena: Icardo Center

2023–24 Big West women's basketball standings
	Conf.				Overall
Team	W		L	PCT	W		L	PCT
Hawai'i	17	–	3	.850	20	–	12	.625
UC Irvine †	16	–	4	.800	23	–	9	.719
UC Riverside	13	–	7	.650	18	–	14	.563
Cal Poly	13	–	7	.650	17	–	14	.548
UC Davis	13	–	7	.650	20	–	14	.588
UC Santa Barbara	10	–	10	.500	16	–	15	.516
UC San Diego*	8	–	12	.400	12	–	19	.387
Long Beach State	8	–	12	.400	15	–	18	.455
Cal State Fullerton	6	–	14	.300	10	–	21	.323
Cal State Bakersfield	5	–	15	.250	8	–	21	.276
Cal State Northridge	1	–	19	.050	3	–	27	.100
† 2024 Big West tournament winner * ineligible for the 2024 NCAA tournament due to transition period

The 2023–24 Cal State Bakersfield Roadrunners women's basketball team represented California State University, Bakersfield during the 2023–24 NCAA Division I women's basketball season. The Roadrunners, led by 13th-year head coach Greg McCall, played their home games at the Icardo Center in Bakersfield, California as members of the Big West Conference.

They finished the season 8–21, 5–15 in Big West play, to finish in tenth place. Since only the top eight teams in the conference participate, the Roadrunners failed to qualify for the Big West tournament.

== Previous season ==
The Roadrunners finished the 2022–23 season 8–23, 3–17 in Big West play, to finish in a tie for last (10th) place. As the #9 seed in the Big West tournament, they defeated #8 seed Cal State Northridge in the first round, and upset top-seeded UC Irvine in the quarterfinals before falling to #5 seed UC Santa Barbara in the semifinals.

== Roster ==
2023–24 Cal State Bakersfield Roadrunners women's basketball team
Players
Coaches

Pos.	#	Name	Height	Year	Previous school	Hometown
G	0	Shaunae Brown	5 ft 5 in (1.65 m)	RS Jr	Canisius	Toronto, ON
G	2	Morgan Edwards	5 ft 7 in (1.7 m)	So	Redondo Union High School	Los Angeles, CA
G	4	Grace Hunter	5 ft 10 in (1.78 m)	Sr	FIU	Porirua, New Zealand
G	5	Sophia Tougas	6 ft 0 in (1.83 m)	RS So	Bradford Christian Academy	Glens Falls, NY
G	11	Taylor Caldwell	5 ft 9 in (1.75 m)	GS	Grand Canyon	Bakersfield, CA
C	12	Cassidy Johnson	6 ft 5 in (1.96 m)	RS Sr	Pacific	Lehi, UT
G	14	Nseije Ortiz	5 ft 6 in (1.68 m)	So	Porterville High School	Porterville, CA
G	15	Amourie Porter	5 ft 9 in (1.75 m)	Fr	Glen Burnie High School	Glen Burnie, MD
G	23	Jordan Olivares	5 ft 8 in (1.73 m)	GS	Sacramento State	Seaside, CA
F	24	Ary Dizon	6 ft 2 in (1.88 m)	Jr	Vermont	Tampa, FL
F	32	Garrisen Freeman	5 ft 10 in (1.78 m)	RS So	Spring Valley High School	Las Vegas, NV
F	33	Julia Riley	6 ft 1 in (1.85 m)	So	Granite Bay High School	Granite Bay, CA
C	34	Jordan Brooks	6 ft 3 in (1.91 m)	Jr	Victor Valley College	Apple Valley, CA

Head coach

- Greg McCall (Cal State Bakersfield)

Assistant coach(es)

- Xavier Johnson (William Penn)
- Zack Grasmick (Cal State Bakersfield)
- Grant Bingham (Cal State Bakersfield)
- Jasmin Dixon (Cal State Bakersfield)

Legend

- (C) Team captain
- (S) Suspended
- (I) Ineligible
- (W) Walk-on
- Injured
- Current redshirt

Roster
Last update: January 18, 2024

== Schedule and results ==
Date time, TV	Rank^{#}	Opponent^{#}	Result	Record	High points	High rebounds	High assists	Site (attendance) city, state
Exhibition
November 2, 2023*; 7:00 p.m., ESPN+		Hope International	W 72–61	–	27 – Brown	10 – 2 tied	4 – Hunter	Icardo Center (398); Bakersfield, CA
Non-conference regular season
November 6, 2023*; 8:30 p.m., P12N		at California	L 56–89	0–1	10 – Olivares	7 – 2 tied	3 – Olivares	Haas Pavilion (1,017); Berkeley, CA
November 12, 2023*; 2:00 p.m., ESPN+		at Pacific	L 54–67	0–2	16 – Hunter	7 – Olivares	3 – Hunter	Alex G. Spanos Center (642); Stockton, CA
November 18, 2023*; 7:00 p.m., ESPN+		Fresno State	W 65–63	1–2	22 – Tougas	7 – 3 tied	7 – Hunter	Icardo Center (720); Bakersfield, CA
November 24, 2023*; 4:00 p.m., NEC Front Row		at LIU; Long Island Tournament	W 62–57	2–2	28 – Brown	10 – Olivares	4 – Olivares	Steinberg Wellness Center (125); Brooklyn, NY
November 25, 2023*; 10:00 a.m.		vs. New Mexico State; Long Island Tournament	L 59–64	2–3	15 – Brown	7 – Olivares	5 – Olivares	Steinberg Wellness Center (143); Brooklyn, NY
November 27, 2023*; 3:00 p.m., SLN		at Omaha	L 79–87 ^{OT}	2–4	20 – 2 tied	6 – Porter	5 – Olivares	Baxter Arena (312); Omaha, NE
December 6, 2023*; 5:30 p.m., MWN		at Boise State	L 66–87	2–5	24 – Brown	4 – Olivares	2 – Freeman	ExtraMile Arena (838); Boise, ID
December 16, 2023*; 1:00 p.m., ESPN+		Pepperdine	L 60–80	2–6	21 – Brown	13 – Tougas	5 – Olivares	Icardo Center (386); Bakersfield, CA
December 21, 2023*; 1:00 p.m., ESPN+		Whittier	W 60–52	3–6	14 – Brown	11 – Tougas	2 – 3 tied	Icardo Center (304); Bakersfield, CA
Big West regular season
December 28, 2023; 7:00 p.m., ESPN+		UC San Diego	W 52–48	4–6 (1–0)	19 – Brown	10 – Olivares	3 – Ortiz	Icardo Center (505); Bakersfield, CA
December 30, 2023; 2:00 p.m., ESPN+		at UC Irvine	L 48–71	4–7 (1–1)	17 – Riley	4 – Olivares	3 – Brown	Bren Events Center (580); Irvine, CA
January 4, 2024; 8:00 p.m., ESPN+		at Hawaii	L 43–67	4–8 (1–2)	13 – Brown	6 – Riley	3 – 2 tied	Stan Sheriff Center (1,471); Honolulu, HI
January 11, 2024; 7:00 p.m., ESPN+		UC Santa Barbara	L 54–75	4–9 (1–3)	14 – Brown	5 – 2 tied	2 – 2 tied	Icardo Center (387); Bakersfield, CA
January 13, 2024; 2:00 p.m., ESPN+		UC Davis	L 46–62	4–10 (1–4)	13 – Brown	9 – Freeman	2 – 2 tied	Icardo Center (309); Bakersfield, CA
January 18, 2024; 6:00 p.m., ESPN+		at UC Riverside	L 62–64	4–11 (1–5)	23 – Olivares	7 – Porter	4 – Ortiz	SRC Arena (122); Riverside, CA
January 20, 2024; 2:00 p.m., ESPN+		at Cal Poly	L 67–80	4–12 (1–6)	24 – Porter	6 – Riley	5 – Ortiz	Mott Athletics Center (957); San Luis Obispo, CA
January 25, 2024; 7:00 p.m., ESPN+		Cal State Northridge	W 70–54	5–12 (2–6)	21 – Brown	6 – Riley	7 – Ortiz	Icardo Center (691); Bakersfield, CA
January 27, 2024; 2:00 p.m., ESPN+		Cal State Fullerton	W 66–56	6–12 (3–6)	23 – Brown	10 – Tougas	4 – Olivares	Icardo Center (401); Bakersfield, CA
February 1, 2024; 7:00 p.m., ESPN+		at Long Beach State	L 57–70	6–13 (3–7)	17 – Olivares	7 – Porter	2 – 2 tied	Walter Pyramid (517); Long Beach, CA
February 3, 2024; 4:00 p.m., SPECTSN/ESPN+		at UC Santa Barbara	L 55–57	6–14 (3–8)	19 – Olivares	6 – Olivares	5 – Ortiz	The Thunderdome (788); Santa Barbara, CA
February 8, 2024; 11:00 a.m., ESPN+		UC Riverside	L 48–54	6–15 (3–9)	18 – Brown	7 – Freeman	3 – 2 tied	Icardo Center (2,894); Bakersfield, CA
February 10, 2024; 6:00 p.m., ESPN+		at Cal State Fullerton	W 69–61	7–15 (4–9)	19 – Olivares	9 – Porter	6 – Olivares	Titan Gym (116); Fullerton, CA
February 15, 2024; 6:00 p.m., ESPN+		at Cal State Northridge	W 61–50	8–15 (5–9)	21 – Riley	9 – 2 tied	6 – 2 tied	Premier America Credit Union Arena (228); Northridge, CA
February 17, 2024; 2:00 p.m., ESPN+		UC Irvine	L 68–72	8–16 (5–10)	22 – Brown	7 – 3 tied	4 – Hunter	Icardo Center (491); Bakersfield, CA
February 22, 2024; 7:00 p.m., ESPN+		Long Beach State	L 67–69	8–17 (5–11)	20 – Olivares	10 – 2 tied	3 – Olivares	Icardo Center (515); Bakersfield, CA
February 24, 2024; 2:00 p.m., ESPN+		at UC Davis	L 62–78	8–18 (5–12)	25 – Olivares	5 – Tougas	4 – Olivares	University Credit Union Center (876); Davis, CA
February 29, 2024; 7:00 p.m., ESPN+		at UC San Diego	L 43–50	8–19 (5–13)	14 – Olivares	8 – Olivares	3 – Olivares	LionTree Arena; La Jolla, CA
March 2, 2024; 2:00 p.m., ESPN+		Cal Poly	L 56–74	8–20 (5–14)	16 – Porter	5 – Tougas	4 – Olivares	Icardo Center (420); Bakersfield, CA
March 9, 2024; 2:00 p.m., ESPN+		Hawaii	L 48–85	8–21 (5–15)	17 – Brown	9 – Porter	2 – Porter	Icardo Center (512); Bakersfield, CA
*Non-conference game. ^{#}Rankings from AP poll. (#) Tournament seedings in parentheses. All times are in Pacific.
