= 2023–24 Cal State Fullerton Titans women's basketball team =

American college basketball season

2023–24 Cal State Fullerton Titans women's basketball
- Conference: Big West Conference
- Record: 10–21 (6–14 Big West)
- Head coach: Jeff Harada (7th season)
- Assistant coaches: Nick Milan; Brittany Aikens; Chelsea Stocks
- Home arena: Titan Gym

2023–24 Big West women's basketball standings
	Conf.				Overall
Team	W		L	PCT	W		L	PCT
Hawai'i	17	–	3	.850	20	–	12	.625
UC Irvine †	16	–	4	.800	23	–	9	.719
UC Riverside	13	–	7	.650	18	–	14	.563
Cal Poly	13	–	7	.650	17	–	14	.548
UC Davis	13	–	7	.650	20	–	14	.588
UC Santa Barbara	10	–	10	.500	16	–	15	.516
UC San Diego*	8	–	12	.400	12	–	19	.387
Long Beach State	8	–	12	.400	15	–	18	.455
Cal State Fullerton	6	–	14	.300	10	–	21	.323
Cal State Bakersfield	5	–	15	.250	8	–	21	.276
Cal State Northridge	1	–	19	.050	3	–	27	.100
† 2024 Big West tournament winner * ineligible for the 2024 NCAA tournament due to transition period

The 2023–24 Cal State Fullerton Titans women's basketball team represented California State University, Fullerton during the 2023–24 NCAA Division I women's basketball season. The Titans, led by seventh-year head coach Jeff Harada, played their home games at Titan Gym in Fullerton, California, as members of the Big West Conference.

== Previous season ==
The Titans finished the 2022–23 season 14–16, 9–11 in Big West play to finish in seventh place. As the #6 seed in the Big West tournament, they fell to #3 seed and eventual tournament champions Hawaii in the quarterfinals.

== Roster ==
2023–24 Cal State Fullerton Titans women's basketball team
Players
Coaches

Pos.	#	Name	Height	Year	Previous school	Hometown
G	1	Genna Wienecke	5 ft 10 in (1.78 m)	Fr	Xavier College Prep High School	Palm Springs, California
G	2	Hope Hassmann	5 ft 8 in (1.73 m)	Fr	Tahoma High School	Maple Valley, Washington
G	3	Kaliana Salazar-Harrell	5 ft 6 in (1.68 m)	RS Fr	Konawaena High School	Kailua-Kona, Hawaii
G	4	Gabi Vidmar	5 ft 10 in (1.78 m)	Sr	Immanuel College	Adelaide, Australia
G	10	Demonnie Lagway	5 ft 10 in (1.78 m)	So	Palisades Charter High School	Los Angeles, California
F	11	Ruby MacDonald	6 ft 1 in (1.85 m)	Jr	Lake Ginninderra College	Wollongong, Australia
G	12	Eva Levingston	6 ft 0 in (1.83 m)	Fr	Piedmont High School	Oakland, California
F	13	Aixchel Hernandez	6 ft 2 in (1.88 m)	Jr	Orangewood Academy	Chihuahua, Mexico
F	21	Allysan Tse	5 ft 8 in (1.73 m)	So	South Pasadena High School	Pasadena, California
G	23	Emily Strachan	5 ft 7 in (1.7 m)	Jr	Central Maine Community College	Lewiston, Maine
F	24	Kathryn Neff	6 ft 0 in (1.83 m)	Sr	Mission Hills High School	San Diego, California
C	32	Ashlee Lewis	6 ft 1 in (1.85 m)	Sr	Long Beach Poly High School	Cerritos, California
G	33	Brielle Minor	5 ft 9 in (1.75 m)	Fr	Santa Monica High School	Los Angeles, California
G	55	Fujika Nimmo	5 ft 8 in (1.73 m)	Sr	FIU	Davenport, Florida

Head coach

- Jeff Harada (Colorado)

Assistant coach(es)

- Nick Milan (Cal State Fullerton)
- Brittany Aikens (Fresno State)
- Chelsea Stocks (Washington State)

Legend

- (C) Team captain
- (S) Suspended
- (I) Ineligible
- (W) Walk-on
- Injured
- Current redshirt

Roster
Last update: January 18, 2024

== Schedule and results ==
Date time, TV	Rank^{#}	Opponent^{#}	Result	Record	High points	High rebounds	High assists	Site (attendance) city, state
Exhibition
November 4, 2023*; 2:00 pm		Concordia–Irvine	W 80–56	–	–	–	–	Titan Gym; Fullerton, CA
Non-conference regular season
November 10, 2023*; 6:00 pm, ESPN+		at Pacific	L 57–73	0–1	17 – Lewis	9 – Lewis	5 – Hassmann	Alex G. Spanos Center (1,002); Stockton, CA
November 12, 2023*; 2:00 pm, ESPN+		at Sacramento State	W 61–51	1–1	11 – Neff	5 – 3 Tied	3 – 2 Tied	Hornets Nest (415); Sacramento, CA
November 17, 2023*; 2:00 pm		vs. Idaho; Bank of Hawaii Classic	L 48–56	1–2	19 – Vidmar	8 – Lewis	3 – Hassmann	Stan Sheriff Center (100); Honolulu, HI
November 19, 2023*; 4:30 pm		vs. San Francisco; Bank of Hawaii Classic	W 54–48	2–2	22 – Hassmann	16 – Lewis	3 – Vidmar	Stan Sheriff Center; Honolulu, HI
November 26, 2023*; 2:00 pm, ESPN+		Georgetown	L 55–65	2–3	11 – Hassmann	8 – Vidmar	4 – Vidmar	Titan Gym (287); Fullerton, CA
November 29, 2023*; 7:00 pm, ESPN+		San Jose State	W 71–64	3–3	17 – Hassmann	7 – Lewis	4 – Minor	Titan Gym (231); Fullerton, CA
December 6, 2023*; 6:00 pm, MWN		at Fresno State	W 77–68	4–3	22 – Hassmann	9 – Lewis	4 – Vidmar	Save Mart Center (320); Fresno, CA
December 16, 2023*; 1:00 pm, ESPN+		at California Baptist	L 68–73	4–4	29 – Vidmar	9 – Levingston	5 – Minor	Fowler Events Center (401); Riverside, CA
December 18, 2023*; 7:00 pm, P12N		at No. 6 USC	L 44–93	4–5	14 – Neff	7 – Levingston	4 – 2 Tied	Galen Center (1,962); Los Angeles, CA
December 21, 2023*; 4:00 pm, ESPN+		Santa Clara	L 57–76	4–6	20 – Vidmar	8 – Lewis	4 – Hassmann	Titan Gym (176); Fullerton, CA
Big West regular season
December 28, 2023; 7:00 pm, ESPN+		at Long Beach State	W 67–61	5–6 (1–0)	15 – Nimmo	7 – 2 Tied	4 – Nimmo	Walter Pyramid (730); Long Beach, CA
December 30, 2023; 2:00 pm, ESPN+		Hawaii	L 49–59	5–7 (1–1)	17 – Nimmo	14 – Lewis	4 – Hassmann	Titan Gym (209); Fullerton, CA
January 4, 2024; 7:00 pm, ESPN+		UC Irvine	L 44–68	5–8 (1–2)	14 – Vidmar	7 – Lewis	3 – 2 Tied	Titan Gym (172); Fullerton, CA
January 6, 2024; 2:00 pm, ESPN+		at UC San Diego	L 58–71	5–9 (1–3)	10 – Vidmar	4 – 2 Tied	3 – 2 Tied	LionTree Arena (256); La Jolla, CA
January 13, 2024; 6:00 pm, ESPN+		Cal State Northridge	W 68–62	6–9 (2–3)	18 – Vidmar	7 – 2 Tied	3 – 3 Tied	Titan Gym (189); Fullerton, CA
January 18, 2024; 6:00 pm, ESPN+		at UC Davis	L 55–60	6–10 (2–4)	16 – Vidmar	6 – 2 Tied	4 – 2 Tied	University Credit Union Center (580); Davis, CA
January 20, 2024; 6:00 pm, ESPN+		UC Santa Barbara	W 80–67	7–10 (3–4)	18 – Lewis	10 – Lewis	6 – Nimmo	Titan Gym (192); Fullerton, CA
January 25, 2024; 7:00 pm, ESPN+		Cal Poly	L 55–68	7–11 (3–5)	16 – Nimmo	10 – Lewis	3 – 2 Tied	Titan Gym (283); Fullerton, CA
January 27, 2024; 2:00 pm, ESPN+		at Cal State Bakersfield	L 56–66	7–12 (3–6)	20 – Vidmar	13 – Lewis	4 – Vidmar	Icardo Center (401); Bakersfield, CA
February 1, 2024; 9:00 pm, ESPN+		at Hawaii	L 61–66	7–13 (3–7)	25 – Lewis	13 – Lewis	4 – Nimmo	Stan Sheriff Center (1,801); Honolulu, HI
February 8, 2024; 7:00 pm, ESPN+		UC Davis	L 48–61	7–14 (3–8)	12 – Lewis	11 – Lewis	2 – Vidmar	Titan Gym (180); Fullerton, CA
February 10, 2024; 6:00 pm, ESPN+		Cal State Bakersfield	L 61–69	7–15 (3–9)	15 – Vidmar	6 – Hernandez	4 – Hassmann	Titan Gym (116); Fullerton, CA
February 15, 2024; 6:00 pm, ESPN+		at UC Riverside	L 56–67	7–16 (3–10)	12 – Hernandez	11 – Lewis	3 – 3 Tied	SRC Arena (149); Riverside, CA
February 17, 2024; 3:00 pm, SPECTSN/ESPN+		UC San Diego	W 60–46	8–16 (4–10)	23 – Hassmann	6 – 2 Tied	3 – Hassmann	Titan Gym (129); Fullerton, CA
February 22, 2024; 6:00 pm, ESPN+		at Cal Poly	L 47–58	8–17 (4–11)	11 – 2 Tied	8 – Lewis	6 – Hassmann	Mott Athletics Center (921); San Luis Obispo, CA
February 24, 2024; 2:00 pm, ESPN+		at Cal State Northridge	W 75–57	9–17 (5–11)	21 – Lewis	8 – Lewis	6 – Hassmann	Premier America Credit Union Arena (231); Northridge, CA
February 29, 2024; 7:00 pm, ESPN+		Long Beach State	L 59–74	9–18 (5–12)	12 – Hassmann	13 – Vidmar	3 – 2 Tied	Titan Gym; Fullerton, CA
March 2, 2024; 4:00 pm, ESPN+		at UC Santa Barbara	W 78–65	10–18 (6–12)	15 – Lagway	5 – 2 Tied	5 – Hassmann	The Thunderdome (771); Santa Barbara, CA
March 7, 2024; 7:00 pm, ESPN+		UC Riverside	L 50–65	10–19 (6–13)	20 – Lewis	9 – 2 Tied	4 – Nimmo	Titan Gym (288); Fullerton, CA
March 9, 2024; 2:00 pm, ESPN+		at UC Irvine	L 53–69	10–20 (6–14)	14 – Lewis	7 – Lewis	5 – Minor	Bren Events Center (890); Irvine, CA
Big West tournament
March 13, 2024; 12:00 pm, ESPN+	(8)	vs. (5) UC Davis; First Round	L 56–81	10–21	22 – Nimmo	9 – Lewis	3 – Vidmar	Dollar Loan Center; Henderson, NV
*Non-conference game. ^{#}Rankings from AP Poll. (#) Tournament seedings in parentheses. All times are in Pacific.
