= 2023–24 Hawaii Rainbow Wahine basketball team =

American college basketball season

2023–24 Hawaii Rainbow Wahine basketball

Big West regular season champions

WBIT, First Round
- Conference: Big West Conference
- Record: 20–11 (17–3 Big West)
- Head coach: Laura Beeman (12th season)
- Associate head coach: Alex Delanian
- Assistant coaches: Derrick Florence; Khalilah Mitchell
- Home arena: Stan Sheriff Center (Capacity: 10,300)

2023–24 Big West women's basketball standings
	Conf.				Overall
Team	W		L	PCT	W		L	PCT
Hawai'i	17	–	3	.850	20	–	12	.625
UC Irvine †	16	–	4	.800	23	–	9	.719
UC Riverside	13	–	7	.650	18	–	14	.563
Cal Poly	13	–	7	.650	17	–	14	.548
UC Davis	13	–	7	.650	20	–	14	.588
UC Santa Barbara	10	–	10	.500	16	–	15	.516
UC San Diego*	8	–	12	.400	12	–	19	.387
Long Beach State	8	–	12	.400	15	–	18	.455
Cal State Fullerton	6	–	14	.300	10	–	21	.323
Cal State Bakersfield	5	–	15	.250	8	–	21	.276
Cal State Northridge	1	–	19	.050	3	–	27	.100
† 2024 Big West tournament winner * ineligible for the 2024 NCAA tournament due to transition period

The 2023–24 Hawaii Rainbow Wahine basketball team represented the University of Hawaiʻi at Mānoa during the 2023–24 NCAA Division I women's basketball season. The Rainbow Wahine, led by Laura Beeman in her 12th season as head coach, played their home games at SimpliFi Arena at Stan Sheriff Center in Honolulu as a member of the Big West Conference.

== Previous season ==
The Rainbow Wahine finished the season with an 18–15 overall record, 13–7 in Big West conference play. They were seeded third in the Big West Conference tournament, which they won with a 61–59 win over UC Santa Barbara to clinch an automatic bid to the NCAA tournament. Hawaii lost to the eventual national champions LSU in the first round, 73–50.

== Roster ==
2022–23 Hawaii Rainbow Wahine women's basketball team
Players
Coaches

Pos.	#	Name	Height	Year	Previous school	Hometown
F	0	Avery Watkins	6 ft 0 in (1.83 m)	So	Kennedy Catholic HS	Seattle, WA
G	1	Kelsie Imai	5 ft 7 in (1.7 m)	Jr	Waiakea HS	Pahoa, HI
G	2	Ashley Thoms	5 ft 7 in (1.7 m)	RS Sr	Campolindo HS; Weber State	Lafayette, CA
G	3	Lily Wahinekapu	5 ft 7 in (1.7 m)	Jr	ʻIolani School; Cal State Fullerton	Kane‘ohe, O‘ahu
G	4	Jovi Lefotu	5 ft 8 in (1.73 m)	So	ʻIolani School	Kane‘ohe, O‘ahu
F	10	Brooke Murrell	6 ft 2 in (1.88 m)	Fr	Thomas Jefferson HS (CO)	Aurora, CO
C	11	Vivienne Berrett	6 ft 4 in (1.93 m)	Fr	Stanwood HS	Stanwood, WA
F	12	Imani Perez	6 ft 4 in (1.93 m)	So	Mullen HS	Seattle, WA
G	13	Hallie Birdsong	5 ft 3 in (1.6 m)	Jr	Kalani HS	Honolulu, HI
F	14	Brooklyn Rewers	6 ft 4 in (1.93 m)	Jr	Lake City HS; Michigan State	Coeur d'Alene, ID
G	15	Daejah Phillips	5 ft 10 in (1.78 m)	Jr	Centennial HS (NV)	Las Vegas, NV
G	22	Jade Peacock	6 ft 0 in (1.83 m)	Fr	Hillcrest Christian College	Gold Coast, Australia
G	23	Meilani McBee	5 ft 10 in (1.78 m)	Jr	Kennewick HS	Kennewick, WA
F	34	Jacque David	5 ft 11 in (1.8 m)	Jr	William Chrisman HS	Independence, MO
G	45	Olivia Davies	5 ft 9 in (1.75 m)	RS Jr	Mat-Su Career Tech	Anchorage, AK

Head coach

- Laura Beeman (Cal State San Bernardino)

Assistant coach(es)

- Alex Delanian (USC)
  Associate Head Coach
- Derrick Florence (Morehouse)
- Khalilah Mitchell (LSU)

Support staff

- Jason Hill (USC)
  Director of Operations
- Noah Brown (Tabor (KS))
  Director of Player Development
- Dyesha Stahley (Cal Poly)
  Graduate Manager

Legend

- (C) Team captain
- (S) Suspended
- (I) Ineligible
- (W) Walk-on
- Injured
- Current redshirt

Roster

== Schedule ==
Date time, TV	Rank^{#}	Opponent^{#}	Result	Record	High points	High rebounds	High assists	Site (attendance) city, state
Exhibition
November 1, 2023*; 7:00 p.m.		Hawaii–Hilo	W 67–39		13 – McBee	9 – Rewers	4 – 2 players	Stan Sheriff Center (1,083); Honolulu, HI
Non-conference regular season
November 8, 2023*; 5:00 p.m.		at No. 15 Stanford	L 40–87	0–1	8 – Rewers	5 – Team	3 – Imai	Maples Pavilion (2,535); Stanford, CA
November 11, 2023*; 11:00 a.m.		at Santa Clara	L 51–62	0–2	19 – Rewers	12 – Rewers	4 – Imai	Leavey Center (263); Santa Clara, CA
November 17, 2023*; 2:30 p.m.		San Francisco; Bank of Hawaii Classic	W 65–51	1–2	16 – Rewers	10 – Perez	8 – Wahinekapu	Stan Sheriff Center (1,355); Honolulu, HI
November 19, 2023*; 5:00 p.m., Spectrum Sports		Idaho; Bank of Hawaii Classic	L 40–50	1–3	12 – Perez	9 – Rewers	3 – Imai	Stan Sheriff Center (1,620); Honolulu, HI
November 24, 2023*; 2:30 p.m.		Air Force; Rainbow Wahine Showdown	L 51–54	1–4	15 – Perez	7 – Wahinekapu	4 – Phillips	Stan Sheriff Center (1,493); Honolulu, HI
November 25, 2023*; 2:30 p.m.		Idaho State; Rainbow Wahine Showdown	W 58–46	2–4	11 – Tied	7 – Tied	5 – Imai	Stan Sheriff Center (1,372); Honolulu, HI
November 26, 2023*; 5:00 p.m., Spectrum Sports		Washington; Rainbow Wahine Showdown	L 41–58	2–5	12 – McBee	9 – Rewers	2 – Tied	Stan Sheriff Center (1,780); Honolulu, HI
December 3, 2023*; 2:00 p.m., Spectrum Sports		San Jose State	W 73–47	3–5	17 – Phillips	5 – Tied	3 – Tied	Stan Sheriff Center; Honolulu, HI
December 21, 2023*; 11:00 a.m.		at No. 2 UCLA	L 46–85	3–6	11 – Davies	8 – Phillips	5 – Phillips	Pauley Pavilion (2,142); Los Angeles, CA
Big West regular season
December 30, 2023; 12:00 p.m.		at Cal State Fullerton	W 59–49	4–6 (1–0)	12 – Thoms	9 – Perez	4 – Imai	Titan Gym (209); Fullerton, CA
January 4, 2024; 6:00 p.m.		Cal State Bakersfield	W 67–43	5–6 (2–0)	15 – Wahinekapu	10 – Phillips	4 – Davies	Stan Sheriff Center (1,471); Honolulu, HI
January 6, 2024; 7:00 p.m.		Cal State Northridge	W 67–38	6–6 (3–0)	12 – Phillips	7 – Wahinekapu	2 – Tied	Stan Sheriff Center (1,580); Honolulu, HI
January 11, 2024; 4:00 p.m.		at UC Irvine	W 56–49	7–6 (4–0)	17 – Perez	9 – Tied	4 – Wahinekapu	Bren Events Center (640); Irvine, CA
January 13, 2024; 4:00 p.m.		at UC Riverside	L 58–66	7–7 (4–1)	10 – Tied	6 – McBee	3 – Phillips	SRC Arena (137); Riverside, CA
January 18, 2024; 7:00 p.m.		Long Beach State	W 68–55	8–7 (5–1)	19 – Wahinekapu	7 – McBee	7 – Imai	Stan Sheriff Center (1,567); Honolulu, HI
January 20, 2024; 7:00 p.m.		UC San Diego	W 64–52	9–7 (6–1)	16 – Wahinekapu	5 – Wahinekapu	3 – Wahinekapu	Stan Sheriff Center (1,942); Honolulu, HI
January 25, 2024; 5:00 p.m.		at UC Santa Barbara	L 53–65	9–8 (6–2)	14 – Tied	9 – Perez	2 – Tied	Thunderdome (699); Santa Barbara, CA
January 27, 2024; 12:00 p.m.		at Cal Poly	W 63–59	10–8 (7–2)	21 – Perez	9 – Phillips	7 – Phillips	Mott Athletics Center (1,583); San Luis Obispo, CA
February 1, 2024; 7:00 p.m.		Cal State Fullerton	W 66–61	11–8 (8–2)	22 – Phillips	7 – Wahinekapu	2 – Tied	Stan Sheriff Center (1,801); Honolulu, HI
February 3, 2024; 7:00 p.m.		UC Irvine	W 55–43	12–8 (9–2)	14 – McBee	7 – Tied	3 – Phillips	Stan Sheriff Center (2,171); Honolulu, HI
February 8, 2024; 5:00 p.m.		at UC San Diego	W 64–52	13–8 (10–2)	16 – Wahinekapu	8 – Phillips	4 – Wahinekapu	LionTree Arena (538); La Jolla, CA
February 10, 2024; 12:00 p.m.		at UC Davis	L 51–61	13–9 (10–3)	14 – Perez	7 – Tied	3 – Wahinekapu	University Credit Union Center (891); Davis, CA
February 15, 2024; 7:00 p.m.		Cal Poly	W 59–47	14–9 (11–3)	21 – McBee	10 – Perez	3 – Phillips	Stan Sheriff Center (1,700); Honolulu, HI
February 17, 2024; 7:00 p.m.		UC Santa Barbara	W 68–64	15–9 (12–3)	22 – Phillips	8 – Perez	3 – Wahinekapu	Stan Sheriff Center (5,068); Honolulu, HI
February 24, 2024; 1:00 p.m., Spectrum SportsNet		at Long Beach State	W 80–68	16–9 (13–3)	29 – Phillips	9 – Perez	6 – Tied	Walter Pyramid (1,504); Long Beach, CA
February 29, 2024; 7:00 p.m.		UC Davis	W 63–57 ^{OT}	17–9 (14–3)	18 – Wahinekapu	7 – Phillips	2 – Tied	Stan Sheriff Center (1,852); Honolulu, HI
March 2, 2024; 7:00 p.m.		UC Riverside	W 62–51	18–9 (15–3)	18 – Phillips	9 – Phillips	4 – Phillips	Stan Sheriff Center (4,204); Honolulu, HI
March 7, 2024; 4:00 p.m.		at Cal State Northridge	W 65–62	19–9 (16–3)	18 – McBee	12 – Rewers	4 – Imai	Premier Credit Union Arena (175); Northridge, CA
March 9, 2024; 12:00 p.m.		at Cal State Bakersfield	W 85-48	20–9 (17–3)	22 – Wahinekapu	8 – Imai	8 – Imai	Icardo Center (512); Bakersfield, CA
Big West tournament
March 15, 2024; 9:00 am, ESPN+	(1)	vs. (5) UC Davis; Semifinals	L 48–51	20–10	12 – McBee	8 – Wahinekapu	4 – Imai	Dollar Loan Center; Henderson, NV
WBIT
March 21, 2024*; 4:00 pm, ESPN+		at (2) California; First Round	L 60–65	20–11	15 – Wahinekapu	8 – Rewers	3 – McBee	Haas Pavilion (761); Berkeley, CA
*Non-conference game. ^{#}Rankings from AP Poll. (#) Tournament seedings in parentheses. All times are in Hawaii–Aleutian Time. Source:
