= 2023–24 Cal Poly Mustangs women's basketball team =

American college basketball season

2023–24 Cal Poly Mustangs women's basketball

WNIT, first round
- Conference: Big West Conference
- Record: 17–14 (13–7 Big West)
- Head coach: Shanele Stires (2nd season)
- Assistant coaches: Samba Johnson; Njeri Nelms; Brooke Atkinson
- Home arena: Mott Athletics Center

2023–24 Big West women's basketball standings
	Conf.				Overall
Team	W		L	PCT	W		L	PCT
Hawai'i	17	–	3	.850	20	–	12	.625
UC Irvine †	16	–	4	.800	23	–	9	.719
UC Riverside	13	–	7	.650	18	–	14	.563
Cal Poly	13	–	7	.650	17	–	14	.548
UC Davis	13	–	7	.650	20	–	14	.588
UC Santa Barbara	10	–	10	.500	16	–	15	.516
UC San Diego*	8	–	12	.400	12	–	19	.387
Long Beach State	8	–	12	.400	15	–	18	.455
Cal State Fullerton	6	–	14	.300	10	–	21	.323
Cal State Bakersfield	5	–	15	.250	8	–	21	.276
Cal State Northridge	1	–	19	.050	3	–	27	.100
† 2024 Big West tournament winner * ineligible for the 2024 NCAA tournament due to transition period

The 2023–24 Cal Poly Mustangs women's basketball team represented California Polytechnic State University, San Luis Obispo during the 2023–24 NCAA Division I women's basketball season. The Mustangs, led by second-year head coach Shanele Stires, played their home games at the Mott Athletics Center in San Luis Obispo, California as members of the Big West Conference.

== Previous season ==
The Mustangs finished the 2022–23 season 10–18, 7–12 in Big West play, to finish in seventh place. As the #7 seed in the Big West tournament, they were upset by #10 seed UC Riverside in the first round.

== Roster ==
2023–24 Cal Poly Mustangs women's basketball team
Players
Coaches

Pos.	#	Name	Height	Year	Previous school	Hometown
G	1	Brooklyn Perry	5 ft 6 in (1.68 m)	Fr	Folsom High School	Lodi, CA
PG	2	Annika Shah	5 ft 3 in (1.6 m)	Jr	Palo Alto High School	Palo Alto, CA
G	3	Diamond Richardson	5 ft 7 in (1.7 m)	Jr	Pacific	Sacramento, CA
F	4	Sierra Lichtie	6 ft 0 in (1.83 m)	RS Fr	Bingham High School	Riverton, UT
G	5	Ania McNicholas	5 ft 7 in (1.7 m)	GS	Cornell	San Jose, CA
G	10	Sidney Richards	5 ft 7 in (1.7 m)	Jr	San Jose State	Sacramento, CA
G	12	Jordan Billing	5 ft 10 in (1.78 m)	Fr	Emmanuel College	Gold Coast, Australia
G/F	15	Sydney Bourland	5 ft 10 in (1.78 m)	Jr	Archbishop Mitty High School	San Jose, CA
PG	22	Alana Goosby	5 ft 7 in (1.7 m)	Fr	Allen High School	Allen, TX
G/F	24	Mary Carter	6 ft 3 in (1.91 m)	Fr	Antelope High School	Rocklin, CA
G	25	Jordan Hoffman	5 ft 7 in (1.7 m)	Fr	Weatherford High School	Weatherford, OK
F	33	Amanda Olinger	6 ft 3 in (1.91 m)	GS	San Diego	Chatsworth, CA
F	35	Natalia Ackerman	6 ft 1 in (1.85 m)	Sr	Aptos High School	Watsonville, CA

Head coach

- Shanele Stires (Kansas State)

Assistant coach(es)

- Samba Johnson (Chaminade)
- Njeri Nelms (Charleston Southern)
- Brooke Atkinson (Wichita State)

Legend

- (C) Team captain
- (S) Suspended
- (I) Ineligible
- (W) Walk-on
- Injured
- Current redshirt

Roster
Last update: January 14, 2024

== Schedule and results ==
Date time, TV	Rank^{#}	Opponent^{#}	Result	Record	High points	High rebounds	High assists	Site (attendance) city, state
Exhibition
November 2, 2023*; 11:00 a.m.		Simpson	W 70–18	–	19 – Shah	12 – Ackerman	4 – Richards	Mott Athletics Center (1,989); San Luis Obispo, CA
Non-conference regular season
November 6, 2023*; 4:00 p.m., P12N		at No. 24 Washington State	L 61–78	0–1	12 – Ackerman	7 – 2 tied	4 – Shah	Beasley Coliseum (468); Pullman, WA
November 8, 2023*; 6:00 p.m., ESPN+		at Idaho	W 65–55	1–1	19 – Shah	15 – Ackerman	1 – Bourland	ICCU Arena (186); Moscow, ID
November 11, 2023*; 12:00 p.m., MWN		at San Jose State	L 56–61	1–2	11 – Carter	10 – 2 tied	4 – Richards	Provident Credit Union Event Center (573); San Jose, CA
November 13, 2023*; 3:00 p.m., P12N		at California	L 60–74	1–3	12 – 2 tied	10 – Carter	4 – Bourland	Haas Pavilion (617); Berkeley, CA
November 16, 2023*; 7:00 p.m., P12N		at No. 6 Stanford	L 32–86	1–4	9 – Shah	6 – Ackerman	2 – McNicholas	Maples Pavilion; Stanford, CA
November 21, 2023*; 6:00 p.m., ESPN+		at Seattle	W 68–43	2–4	22 – Shah	9 – Lichtie	3 – 3 tied	Redhawk Center (295); Seattle, WA
November 28, 2023*; 7:00 p.m., P12N		at No. 6 USC	L 44–85	2–5	11 – Carter	8 – Ackerman	5 – McNicholas	Galen Center (1,419); Los Angeles, CA
December 9, 2023*; 2:00 p.m., ESPN+		Fresno State	W 84–59	3–5	19 – Ackerman	10 – Ackerman	7 – McNicholas	Mott Athletics Center (1,256); San Luis Obispo, CA
December 16, 2023*; 6:00 p.m., ESPN+		Montana	L 65–67	3–6	24 – Shah	6 – McNicholas	5 – McNicholas	Mott Athletics Center (752); San Luis Obispo, CA
December 21, 2023*; 11:00 a.m., ESPN+		at Sacramento State	W 72–55	4–6	17 – Shah	15 – Ackerman	6 – Bourland	Hornets Nest (429); Sacramento, CA
Big West regular season
December 28, 2023; 6:00 p.m., ESPN+		at Cal State Northridge	W 68–43	5–6 (1–0)	15 – Ackerman	12 – Bourland	5 – McNicholas	Premier America Credit Union Arena (161); Northridge, CA
December 30, 2023; 2:00 p.m., ESPN+		UC Davis	W 57–54	6–6 (2–0)	17 – Ackerman	12 – Ackerman	5 – Shah	Mott Athletics Center (1,154); San Luis Obispo, CA
January 4, 2024; 7:00 p.m., ESPN+		at Long Beach State	W 64–56	7–6 (3–0)	18 – 2 tied	5 – McNicholas	5 – McNicholas	Walter Pyramid (569); Long Beach, CA
January 6, 2024; 4:00 p.m., ESPN+		at UC Santa Barbara	L 64–65 ^{OT}	7–7 (3–1)	15 – Bourland	10 – Carter	5 – Bourland	The Thunderdome (606); Santa Barbara, CA
January 11, 2024; 6:00 p.m., ESPN+		UC Riverside	L 53–64	7–8 (3–2)	18 – Carter	7 – Lichtie	2 – 2 tied	Mott Athletics Center (752); San Luis Obispo, CA
January 13, 2024; 2:00 p.m., ESPN+		at UC San Diego	W 49–39	8–8 (4–2)	15 – Bourland	9 – Ackerman	3 – Richards	LionTree Arena (239); La Jolla, CA
January 20, 2024; 2:00 p.m., ESPN+		Cal State Bakersfield	W 80–67	9–8 (5–2)	29 – Ackerman	13 – Ackerman	6 – Bourland	Mott Athletics Center (957); San Luis Obispo, CA
January 25, 2024; 7:00 p.m., ESPN+		at Cal State Fullerton	W 68–55	10–8 (6–2)	18 – Shah	9 – Lichtie	4 – Ackerman	Titan Gym (283); Fullerton, CA
January 27, 2024; 2:00 p.m., ESPN+		Hawaii	L 59–63	10–9 (6–3)	15 – Bourland	8 – Ackerman	4 – 2 tied	Mott Athletics Center (1,583); San Luis Obispo, CA
February 1, 2024; 2:00 p.m., ESPN+		at UC Irvine	L 0–2 (Forfeit)	10–9 (6–4)	–	–	–	Bren Events Center; Irvine, CA
February 3, 2024; 2:00 p.m., ESPN+		at UC Davis	W 57–47	11–9 (7–4)	20 – McNicholas	6 – McNicholas	4 – Shah	University Credit Union Center (887); Davis, CA
February 8, 2024; 6:00 p.m., ESPN+		Cal State Northridge	W 75–68	12–9 (8–4)	25 – Shah	12 – Ackerman	3 – McNicholas	Mott Athletics Center (884); San Luis Obispo, CA
February 10, 2024; 2:00 p.m., ESPN+		Long Beach State	W 84–76	13–9 (9–4)	25 – Ackerman	11 – Ackerman	4 – McNicholas	Mott Athletics Center (1,294); San Luis Obispo, CA
February 15, 2024; 9:00 p.m., ESPN+		at Hawaii	L 47–59	13–10 (9–5)	14 – Shah	6 – Ackerman	4 – Richards	Stan Sheriff Center (1,700); Honolulu, HI
February 22, 2024; 6:00 p.m., ESPN+		Cal State Fullerton	W 58–47	14–10 (10–5)	12 – Shah	10 – Ackerman	10 – Shah	Mott Athletics Center (921); San Luis Obispo, CA
February 24, 2024; 6:00 p.m., ESPN+		at UC Riverside	L 60–62 ^{OT}	14–11 (10–6)	16 – Ackerman	12 – Ackerman	4 – Bourland	SRC Arena (157); Riverside, CA
February 29, 2024; 6:00 p.m., ESPN+		UC Santa Barbara	W 73–64	15–11 (11–6)	17 – Richards	11 – Ackerman	5 – Richards	Mott Athletics Center (1,352); San Luis Obispo, CA
March 2, 2024; 2:00 p.m., ESPN+		at Cal State Bakersfield	W 74–56	16–11 (12–6)	20 – Ackerman	11 – Ackerman	5 – Bourland	Icardo Center (420); Bakersfield, CA
March 7, 2024; 6:00 p.m., ESPN+		UC Irvine	L 31–65	16–12 (12–7)	8 – McNicholas	10 – Ackerman	2 – 3 tied	Mott Athletics Center (827); San Luis Obispo, CA
March 9, 2024; 2:00 p.m., ESPN+		UC San Diego	W 59–52	17–12 (13–7)	14 – Lichtie	10 – Ackerman	2 – 2 tied	Mott Athletics Center; San Luis Obispo, CA
Big West tournament
March 14, 2024; 2:30 p.m., ESPN+	(4)	vs. (5) UC Davis; Quarterfinals	L 48–56	17–13	17 – McNicholas	16 – Ackerman	6 – McNicholas	Dollar Loan Center (569); Henderson, NV
National Invitational Tournament
March 21, 2024*; 6:00 p.m., ESPN+		at Pacific; First round	L 43–63	17–14	12 – Carter	8 – Bourland	3 – Richards	Alex G. Spanos Center (749); Stockton, CA
*Non-conference game. ^{#}Rankings from AP poll. (#) Tournament seedings in parentheses. All times are in Pacific.
