= 2023–24 UC San Diego Tritons women's basketball team =

American college basketball season

2023–24 UC San Diego Tritons women's basketball
- Conference: Big West Conference
- Record: 12–19 (8–12 Big West)
- Head coach: Heidi VanDerveer (12th season)
- Associate head coach: Chelsea Carlisle
- Assistant coaches: Britinee Yasukochi; PhyNique Allen; Alexandria Young
- Home arena: LionTree Arena

2023–24 Big West women's basketball standings
	Conf.				Overall
Team	W		L	PCT	W		L	PCT
Hawai'i	17	–	3	.850	20	–	12	.625
UC Irvine †	16	–	4	.800	23	–	9	.719
UC Riverside	13	–	7	.650	18	–	14	.563
Cal Poly	13	–	7	.650	17	–	14	.548
UC Davis	13	–	7	.650	20	–	14	.588
UC Santa Barbara	10	–	10	.500	16	–	15	.516
UC San Diego*	8	–	12	.400	12	–	19	.387
Long Beach State	8	–	12	.400	15	–	18	.455
Cal State Fullerton	6	–	14	.300	10	–	21	.323
Cal State Bakersfield	5	–	15	.250	8	–	21	.276
Cal State Northridge	1	–	19	.050	3	–	27	.100
* ineligible for the 2024 NCAA tournament due to transition period
† 2024 Big West tournament winner

The 2023–24 UC San Diego Tritons women's basketball team represented the University of California, San Diego during the 2023–24 NCAA Division I women's basketball season. The Tritons, led by 12th-year head coach Heidi VanDerveer, played their home games at LionTree Arena in La Jolla, California, as members of the Big West Conference.

The Tritons were ineligible for postseason tournaments, including the NCAA tournament, as they were in the final year of the four-year mandatory transition period to Division I.

== Previous season ==
The Tritons finished the 2022–23 season 13–17, 10–10 in Big West play, to finish in sixth place. Since they were in the third year of the four-year mandatory transition period to Division I, they were ineligible to participate in the Big West tournament.

== Roster ==
2023–24 UC San Diego Tritons women's basketball team
Players
Coaches

Pos.	#	Name	Height	Year	Previous school	Hometown
G	2	Grace Talbot	5 ft 7 in (1.7 m)	So	Chatfield Senior High School	Littleton, CO
G	3	Sumayah Sugapong	5 ft 7 in (1.7 m)	Fr	La Jolla Country Day School	San Diego, CA
G	5	Gabby Louther	5 ft 11 in (1.8 m)	So	Pueblo West High School	Pueblo West, CO
F/C	11	Erin Condron	6 ft 4 in (1.93 m)	Fr	Braemar College	Woodend (Vic.), Australia
G	12	Rosa Smith	5 ft 7 in (1.7 m)	So	Idaho	Kirkland, WA
F	13	Meaali‘i Amosa	6 ft 1 in (1.85 m)	Jr	Pepperdine	Garden Grove, CA
G	20	Izzy Forsyth	6 ft 0 in (1.83 m)	Jr	Semiahmoo Secondary School	Vancouver, BC
G	22	Gracie Gallegos	6 ft 1 in (1.85 m)	RS Fr	Mullen High School	Denver, CO
G	23	Eri Blithikioti	5 ft 11 in (1.8 m)	Fr	ACS Athens	Athens, Greece
G	24	Denali Pinto	6 ft 0 in (1.83 m)	GS	Colorado School of Mines	Boulder, CO
G	25	Junae Mahan	5 ft 8 in (1.73 m)	So	Lincoln High School	Stockton, CA
F	30	Damilola Sule	6 ft 0 in (1.83 m)	Jr	UC Merced	Bakersfield, CA
G	32	Parker Montgomery	5 ft 7 in (1.7 m)	Sr	Marlborough School	Porter Ranch, CA
C	33	Emma Svoboda	6 ft 3 in (1.91 m)	Jr	Oklahoma	La Quinta, CA
C	35	Katie Springs	6 ft 0 in (1.83 m)	Jr	Archbishop Mitty High School	San Jose, CA

Head coach

- Heidi VanDerveer (College of Charleston)

Assistant coach(es)

- Chelsea Carlisle (UC San Diego)
- Britinee Yasukochi (Occidental)
- PhyNique Allen (Cal State Bakersfield)
- Alexandria Young (San Diego)

Legend

- (C) Team captain
- (S) Suspended
- (I) Ineligible
- (W) Walk-on
- Injured
- Current redshirt

Roster
Last update: January 17, 2024

== Schedule and results ==
Date time, TV	Rank^{#}	Opponent^{#}	Result	Record	High points	High rebounds	High assists	Site (attendance) city, state
Non-conference regular season
November 6, 2023*; 5:00 p.m., ESPN+		California Baptist	L 50–64	0–1	16 – Sugapong	11 – Springs	4 – Smith	LionTree Arena (403); La Jolla, CA
November 8, 2023*; 11:00 a.m., ESPN+		Life Pacific	W 88–32	1–1	17 – Forsyth	16 – Springs	5 – Blithikioti	LionTree Arena (581); La Jolla, CA
November 12, 2023*; 1:00 p.m., ESPN+		at Saint Mary's	L 58–61 ^{OT}	1–2	17 – Sugapong	10 – Springs	2 – 3 tied	University Credit Union Pavilion (403); Moraga, CA
November 15, 2023*; 7:00 p.m., ESPN+		La Sierra	W 94–40	2–2	20 – Forsyth	6 – 2 tied	8 – Blithikioti	LionTree Arena (131); La Jolla, CA
November 19, 2023*; 2:00 p.m., ESPN+		Northern Arizona	L 69–74	2–3	19 – Sugapong	11 – Springs	4 – Sugapong	LionTree Arena (934); La Jolla, CA
November 26, 2023*; 2:00 p.m., ESPN+		Penn	L 68–76	2–4	17 – 2 tied	7 – Springs	3 – 2 tied	LionTree Arena (589); La Jolla, CA
November 28, 2023*; 6:00 p.m., MWN		at San Diego State	W 77–71 ^{OT}	3–4	18 – Sugapong	11 – Springs	4 – Blithikioti	Viejas Arena (1,023); San Diego, CA
December 2, 2023*; 4:00 p.m., MWN		at Fresno State	L 52–71	3–5	17 – Sugapong	5 – 2 tied	2 – 4 tied	Save Mart Center (341); Fresno, CA
December 7, 2023*; 5:30 p.m., P12N		at Arizona	L 38–81	3–6	14 – Pinto	7 – Springs	3 – Montgomery	McKale Center (6,702); Tucson, AZ
December 20, 2023*; 4:00 p.m., ESPN+		vs. Boise State; USD Winter Classic	W 62–56	4–6	22 – Sugapong	6 – 2 tied	4 – 2 tied	Jenny Craig Pavilion (121); San Diego, CA
December 21, 2023*; 2:00 p.m., ESPN+		vs. Montana; USD Winter Classic	L 67–68	4–7	25 – Sugapong	11 – Springs	4 – Sugapong	Jenny Craig Pavilion (138); San Diego, CA
Big West regular season
December 28, 2023; 7:00 p.m., ESPN+		at Cal State Bakersfield	L 48–52	4–8 (0–1)	16 – Forsyth	15 – Springs	4 – Blithikioti	Icardo Center (505); Bakersfield, CA
January 4, 2024; 7:00 p.m., ESPN+		UC Santa Barbara	W 64–50	5–8 (1–1)	20 – Sugapong	7 – Forsyth	3 – Blithikioti	LionTree Arena (311); La Jolla, CA
January 6, 2024; 2:00 p.m., ESPN+		Cal State Fullerton	W 71–58	6–8 (2–1)	28 – Pinto	20 – Springs	3 – Montgomery	LionTree Arena (256); La Jolla, CA
January 11, 2024; 7:00 p.m., ESPN+		at Long Beach State	W 45–30	7–8 (3–1)	12 – Springs	9 – Springs	2 – 2 tied	Walter Pyramid (535); Long Beach, CA
January 13, 2024; 2:00 p.m., ESPN+		Cal Poly	L 39–49	7–9 (3–2)	11 – Pinto	6 – 2 tied	2 – 3 tied	LionTree Arena (239); La Jolla, CA
January 18, 2024; 7:00 p.m., ESPN+		UC Irvine	L 49–57	7–10 (3–3)	19 – Sugapong	8 – Forsyth	3 – Sugapong	LionTree Arena (518); La Jolla, CA
January 20, 2024; 9:00 p.m., ESPN+		at Hawaii	L 52-64	7-11 (3-4)	15 – 2 tied	7 – Sule	3 – Montgomery	Stan Sheriff Center (1,942); Honolulu, HI
January 25, 2024; 7:00 p.m., ESPN+		at UC Riverside	W 51-43	8-11 (4-4)	22 – Sugapong	11 – Pinto	3 – Pinto	SRC Arena (121); Riverside, CA
January 27, 2024; 2:00 p.m., ESPN+		UC Davis	L 49-62	8-12 (4-5)	13 – Montgomery	4 – 3 tied	3 – Sugapong	LionTree Arena (352); La Jolla, CA
February 1, 2024; 7:00 p.m., ESPN+		at Cal State Northridge	W 53-52	9-12 (5-5)	12 – Sugapong	9 – 2 tied	5 – Sugapong	Premier America Credit Union Arena (320); Northridge, CA
February 3, 2024; 2:00 p.m., ESPN+		Long Beach State	W 78-45	10-12 (6-5)	21 – Pinto	10 – Forsyth	3 – 2 tied	LionTree Arena (568); La Jolla, CA
February 8, 2024; 7:00 p.m., ESPN+		Hawaii	L 52-64	10-13 (6-6)	13 – Gallegos	12 – Sule	3 – 2 tied	LionTree Arena (538); La Jolla, CA
February 15, 2024; 7:00 p.m., ESPN+		at UC Santa Barbara	L 52-60	10-14 (6-7)	14 – Pinto	7 – Montgomery	3 – Montgomery	The Thunderdome (562); Santa Barbara, CA
February 17, 2024; 3:00 p.m., SPECTSN/ESPN+		at Cal State Fullerton	L 46-60	10-15 (6-8)	13 – Pinto	6 – 2 tied	2 – 2 tied	Titan Gym (129); Fullerton, CA
February 22, 2024; 7:00 p.m., ESPN+		UC Riverside	L 48-63	10-16 (6-9)	15 – Pinto	7 – 2 tied	4 – Sugapong	LionTree Arena (471); La Jolla, CA
February 24, 2024; 2:00 p.m., ESPN+		at UC Irvine	W 69-65 ^{OT}	11-16 (7-9)	18 – Gallegos	12 – Gallegos	3 – 2 tied	Bren Events Center (837); Irvine, CA
February 29, 2024; 7:00 p.m., ESPN+		Cal State Bakersfield	W 50-43	12-16 (8-9)	15 – Forsyth	11 – Gallegos	3 – Blithikioti	LionTree Arena; La Jolla, CA
March 2, 2024; 2:00 p.m., ESPN+		Cal State Northridge	L 64-66 ^{OT}	12-17 (8-10)	20 – Sugapong	16 – Springs	4 – Montgomery	LionTree Arena (341); La Jolla, CA
March 7, 2024; 7:00 p.m., ESPN+		at UC Davis	L 56-64	12-18 (8-11)	23 – Sugapong	10 – Sule	1 – 5 tied	University Credit Union Center (1,127); Davis, CA
March 9, 2024; 2:00 p.m., ESPN+		at Cal Poly	L 52-59	12-19 (8-12)	19 – Sugapong	8 – Springs	2 – Sugapong	Mott Athletics Center; San Luis Obispo, CA
*Non-conference game. ^{#}Rankings from AP poll. (#) Tournament seedings in parentheses. All times are in Pacific.
