= 2023–24 UC Davis Aggies women's basketball team =

American college basketball season

2023–24 UC Davis Aggies women's basketball
- Conference: Big West Conference
- Record: 20–14 (13–7 Big West)
- Head coach: Jennifer Gross (13th season)
- Associate head coach: Joe Teramoto
- Assistant coaches: Matt Klemin; Vicki Baugh
- Home arena: University Credit Union Center

2023–24 Big West women's basketball standings
	Conf.				Overall
Team	W		L	PCT	W		L	PCT
Hawai'i	17	–	3	.850	20	–	12	.625
UC Irvine †	16	–	4	.800	23	–	9	.719
UC Riverside	13	–	7	.650	18	–	14	.563
Cal Poly	13	–	7	.650	17	–	14	.548
UC Davis	13	–	7	.650	20	–	14	.588
UC Santa Barbara	10	–	10	.500	16	–	15	.516
UC San Diego*	8	–	12	.400	12	–	19	.387
Long Beach State	8	–	12	.400	15	–	18	.455
Cal State Fullerton	6	–	14	.300	10	–	21	.323
Cal State Bakersfield	5	–	15	.250	8	–	21	.276
Cal State Northridge	1	–	19	.050	3	–	27	.100
† 2024 Big West tournament winner * ineligible for the 2024 NCAA tournament due to transition period

The 2023–24 UC Davis Aggies women's basketball team represented the University of California, Davis during the 2023–24 NCAA Division I women's basketball season. The Aggies, led by 13th-year head coach Jennifer Gross, played their home games at the University Credit Union Center in Davis, California as members of the Big West Conference.

== Previous season ==
The Aggies finished the 2022–23 season 16–14, 12–7 in Big West play, to finish in fourth place. As the #4 seed in the Big West tournament, they were defeated by #5 seed UC Santa Barbara in the quarterfinals.

== Roster ==
2023–24 UC Davis Aggies women's basketball team
Players
Coaches

Pos.	#	Name	Height	Year	Previous school	Hometown
G	3	Campbell Gray	5 ft 10 in (1.78 m)	RS Sr	Tigard High School	Tigard, OR
G	4	Nya Epps	5 ft 10 in (1.78 m)	So	Carondelet High School	El Cerrito, CA
F	10	Lena Svanholm	6 ft 6 in (1.98 m)	GS	Colorado State	Hørsholm, Denmark
G	11	Clara Glad	6 ft 0 in (1.83 m)	Fr	Rogers High School	Rogers, MN
G	13	Sydney Burns	5 ft 9 in (1.75 m)	Jr	Wilsonville High School	Wilsonville, OR
G	14	Tova Sabel	5 ft 11 in (1.8 m)	Sr	Penn State	Stockholm, Sweden
G	15	Evanne Turner	5 ft 9 in (1.75 m)	Sr	Etiwanda High School	Fontana, CA
F	20	Ally Fitzgerald	6 ft 2 in (1.88 m)	So	Colorado	St. Louis, MO
G	23	Victoria Baker	5 ft 9 in (1.75 m)	RS So	UC Irvine	Austin, TX
C	25	Megan Norris	6 ft 3 in (1.91 m)	RS So	Sacred Heart Prep	Menlo Park, CA
F	30	Theoni Tsami	6 ft 1 in (1.85 m)	Fr	Kronos Agiou Dimitriou	Athens, Greece
F	33	Mazatlan Harris	6 ft 2 in (1.88 m)	Jr	Cathedral Catholic High School	San Diego, CA
G	41	Bria Shine	6 ft 1 in (1.85 m)	Jr	Christian Brothers High School	Sacramento, CA

Head coach

- Jennifer Gross (UC Davis)

Assistant coach(es)

- Joe Teramoto (Cal Poly)
- Matt Klemin (Cal Poly)
- Vicki Baugh (Tennessee)

Legend

- (C) Team captain
- (S) Suspended
- (I) Ineligible
- (W) Walk-on
- Injured
- Current redshirt

Roster
Last update: January 16, 2024

== Schedule and results ==
Date time, TV	Rank^{#}	Opponent^{#}	Result	Record	High points	High rebounds	High assists	Site (attendance) city, state
Exhibition
October 29, 2023*; 2:00 p.m.		Cal Poly Humboldt	W 101–50	–	–	–	–	University Credit Union Center; Davis, CA
Non-conference regular season
November 6, 2023*; 11:00 a.m., ESPN+		Academy of Art	W 102–52	1–0	24 – Sabel	12 – Norris	8 – Burns	University Credit Union Center (2,103); Davis, CA
November 9, 2023*; 5:00 p.m., ESPN+		Portland State	L 62–71	1–1	14 – Turner	7 – Sabel	8 – Burns	University Credit Union Center (432); Davis, CA
November 13, 2023*; 6:00 p.m., MWN		at San Diego State	L 68–77	1–2	16 – 2 tied	9 – 2 tied	9 – Burns	Viejas Arena (1,111); San Diego, CA
November 17, 2023*; 6:00 p.m., P12N		at Oregon State	L 48–86	1–3	12 – Norris	4 – Sabel	5 – Burns	Gill Coliseum (3,836); Corvallis, OR
November 21, 2023*; 6:30 p.m., ESPN+		at Sacramento State	W 79–57	2–3	21 – Norris	8 – Norris	6 – Burns	Hornets Nest (424); Sacramento, CA
November 29, 2023*; 5:30 p.m., MWN		at Boise State	L 53–70	2–4	17 – Turner	6 – Harris	3 – 2 tied	ExtraMile Arena (828); Boise, ID
December 1, 2023*; 4:00 p.m., P12N		at Washington State	L 52–77	2–5	20 – Turner	10 – Turner	2 – 3 tied	Beasley Coliseum (840); Pullman, WA
December 5, 2023*; 6:00 p.m., ESPN+		Jessup	W 79–40	3–5	20 – Sabel	11 – Norris	9 – Burns	University Credit Union Center (368); Davis, CA
December 10, 2023*; 2:00 p.m., ESPN+		Saint Mary's	W 87–66	4–5	23 – Turner	7 – Harris	5 – Burns	University Credit Union Center (663); Davis, CA
December 20, 2023*; 1:00 p.m., P12N		at No. 9 Stanford	L 52–92	4–6	17 – Turner	5 – Turner	3 – Norris	Maples Pavilion (2,701); Stanford, CA
Big West regular season
December 28, 2023; 7:00 p.m., ESPN+		at UC Santa Barbara	L 49–60	4–7 (0–1)	11 – Sabel	7 – Norris	6 – Turner	The Thunderdome (513); Santa Barbara, CA
December 30, 2023; 2:00 p.m., ESPN+		at Cal Poly	L 54–57	4–8 (0–2)	13 – Norris	10 – Norris	5 – Sabel	Mott Athletics Center (1,154); San Luis Obispo, CA
January 4, 2024; 6:00 p.m., ESPN+		UC Riverside	W 63–59	5–8 (1–2)	16 – Sabel	5 – 4 tied	5 – Burns	University Credit Union Center (602); Davis, CA
January 6, 2024; 3:00 p.m., ESPN+		UC Irvine	W 60–57	6–8 (2–2)	16 – Sabel	8 – Norris	4 – Sabel	University Credit Union Center (1,012); Davis, CA
January 11, 2024; 6:00 p.m., ESPN+		at Cal State Northridge	W 55–45	7–8 (3–2)	15 – 2 tied	8 – Harris	5 – Burns	Premier America Credit Union Arena (150); Northridge, CA
January 13, 2024; 2:00 p.m., ESPN+		at Cal State Bakersfield	W 62–46	8–8 (4–2)	22 – Turner	8 – Norris	3 – Burns	Icardo Center (309); Bakersfield, CA
January 18, 2024; 6:00 p.m., ESPN+		Cal State Fullerton	W 60–55	9–8 (5–2)	16 – Sabel	10 – Norris	4 – Turner	University Credit Union Center (580); Davis, CA
January 20, 2024; 2:00 p.m., ESPN+		at UC Irvine	L 61–79	9–9 (5–3)	13 – 2 tied	11 – Harris	3 – Norris	Bren Events Center (889); Irvine, CA
January 27, 2024; 2:00 p.m., ESPN+		at UC San Diego	W 62–49	10–9 (6–3)	12 – 2 tied	7 – Norris	3 – Norris	LionTree Arena (352); La Jolla, CA
February 1, 2024; 6:00 p.m., ESPN+		UC Santa Barbara	W 82–62	11–9 (7–3)	22 – Norris	15 – Norris	6 – Turner	University Credit Union Center (636); Davis, CA
February 3, 2024; 2:00 p.m., ESPN+		Cal Poly	L 47–57	11–10 (7–4)	16 – Norris	8 – Norris	3 – Harris	University Credit Union Center (887); Davis, CA
February 8, 2024; 7:00 p.m., ESPN+		at Cal State Fullerton	W 61–48	12–10 (8–4)	17 – Sabel	9 – Norris	4 – Norris	Titan Gym (180); Fullerton, CA
February 10, 2024; 2:00 p.m., ESPN+		Hawaii	W 61–51	13–10 (9–4)	17 – Sabel	7 – Sabel	3 – Norris	University Credit Union Center (891); Davis, CA
February 15, 2024; 7:00 p.m., ESPN+		at Long Beach State	L 52–78	13–11 (9–5)	12 – Sabel	7 – Norris	3 – Turner	Walter Pyramid (661); Long Beach, CA
February 17, 2024; 2:00 p.m., ESPN+		at UC Riverside	L 41–50	13–12 (9–6)	12 – Sabel	10 – Sabel	3 – Burns	SRC Arena (123); Riverside, CA
February 22, 2024; 6:00 p.m., ESPN+		Cal State Northridge	W 58–54	14–12 (10–6)	23 – Turner	9 – Norris	7 – Burns	University Credit Union Center (778); Davis, CA
February 24, 2024; 2:00 p.m., ESPN+		Cal State Bakersfield	W 78–62	15–12 (11–6)	15 – 2 tied	7 – 2 tied	5 – Turner	University Credit Union Center (876); Davis, CA
February 29, 2024; 9:00 p.m., ESPN+		at Hawaii	L 57–63 ^{OT}	15–13 (11–7)	17 – Sabel	10 – Norris	4 – Turner	Stan Sheriff Center (1,852); Honolulu, HI
March 7, 2024; 6:00 p.m., ESPN+		UC San Diego	W 64–56	16–13 (12–7)	28 – Sabel	12 – Sabel	5 – Burns	University Credit Union Center (1,127); Davis, CA
March 9, 2024; 1:00 p.m., ESPN+		Long Beach State	W 70–58	17–13 (13–7)	24 – Turner	11 – Harris	6 – Gray	University Credit Union Center (917); Davis, CA
Big West tournament
March 13, 2024; 12:00 p.m., ESPN+	(5)	vs. (8) Cal State Fullerton; First round	W 81–56	18–13	29 – Turner	12 – Norris	6 – Harris	Dollar Loan Center; Henderson, NV
March 14, 2024; 2:30 p.m., ESPN+	(5)	vs. (4) Cal Poly; Quarterfinals	W 56–48	19–13	17 – Sabel	8 – Turner	3 – Harris	Dollar Loan Center (569); Henderson, NV
March 15, 2024; 12:00 p.m., ESPN+	(5)	vs. (1) Hawaii; Semifinals	W 51–48	20–13	14 – Sabel	7 – Norris	3 – Gray	Dollar Loan Center; Henderson, NV
March 16, 2024; 3:00 p.m., ESPN+	(5)	vs. (2) UC Irvine; Championship game	L 39–53	20–14	18 – Turner	8 – Harris	2 – Harris	Dollar Loan Center; Henderson, NV
*Non-conference game. ^{#}Rankings from AP poll. (#) Tournament seedings in parentheses. All times are in Pacific.
