= 2023–24 UC Irvine Anteaters women's basketball team =

American college basketball season

2023–24 UC Irvine Anteaters women's basketball

Big West tournament champions

NCAA tournament, first round
- Conference: Big West Conference
- Record: 23–9 (16–4 Big West)
- Head coach: Tamara Inoue (8th season)
- Associate head coach: Cecilia Russell-Nava
- Assistant coaches: Derek Wynn; Tyler Ellis
- Home arena: Bren Events Center

2023–24 Big West women's basketball standings
	Conf.				Overall
Team	W		L	PCT	W		L	PCT
Hawai'i	17	–	3	.850	20	–	12	.625
UC Irvine †	16	–	4	.800	23	–	9	.719
UC Riverside	13	–	7	.650	18	–	14	.563
Cal Poly	13	–	7	.650	17	–	14	.548
UC Davis	13	–	7	.650	20	–	14	.588
UC Santa Barbara	10	–	10	.500	16	–	15	.516
UC San Diego*	8	–	12	.400	12	–	19	.387
Long Beach State	8	–	12	.400	15	–	18	.455
Cal State Fullerton	6	–	14	.300	10	–	21	.323
Cal State Bakersfield	5	–	15	.250	8	–	21	.276
Cal State Northridge	1	–	19	.050	3	–	27	.100
† 2024 Big West tournament winner * ineligible for the 2024 NCAA tournament due to transition period

The 2023–24 UC Irvine Anteaters women's basketball team represented the University of California, Irvine during the 2023–24 NCAA Division I women's basketball season. The Anteaters, led by eighth-year head coach Tamara Inoue, played their home games at the Bren Events Center in Irvine, California as members of the Big West Conference.

== Previous season ==
The Anteaters finished the 2022–23 season 25–7, 16–2 in Big West play, to finish as Big West regular-season champions. As the #1 seed in the Big West tournament, they were upset by #9 seed Cal State Bakersfield in the quarterfinals. They received an automatic bid into the WNIT, where they defeated San Diego State in the first round, before falling to San Diego in the second round.

== Roster ==
2023–24 UC Irvine Anteaters women's basketball team
Players
Coaches

Pos.	#	Name	Height	Year	Previous school	Hometown
G	1	Moulayna Johnson Sidi Baba	6 ft 1 in (1.85 m)	GS	Miami (FL)	Stockholm, Sweden
G	2	Haley Hernandez	5 ft 11 in (1.8 m)	Fr	Archbishop Mitty High School	San Jose, CA
G	3	Nikki Tom	5 ft 9 in (1.75 m)	Jr	Clovis West High School	Fresno, CA
G	5	Tarryn Ross	5 ft 10 in (1.78 m)	Sr	Orangewood Academy	Garden Grove, CA
G	11	Amelia Scharpf	6 ft 0 in (1.83 m)	Jr	Archbishop Mitty High School	San Jose, CA
G	12	Shirel Nahum	5 ft 9 in (1.75 m)	Fr	Wingate Academy	Ra'anana, Israel
G	13	Déja Lee	5 ft 9 in (1.75 m)	Jr	Semiahmoo Secondary School	Surrey, BC
G	20	Hunter Hernandez	5 ft 9 in (1.75 m)	Jr	Archbishop Mitty High School	San Jose, CA
G	21	Olivia Williams	6 ft 1 in (1.85 m)	Jr	Archbishop Mitty High School	South San Francisco, CA
F	22	Clara Djoko	6 ft 0 in (1.83 m)	RS Fr	Lycée Marcelin-Berthelot	Entzheim, France
G	23	Diaba Konate	5 ft 7 in (1.7 m)	Sr	Idaho State	Paris, France
F	24	Nevaeh Dean	6 ft 2 in (1.88 m)	Sr	Cincinnati	Hamilton, OH
C	32	Nevaeh Parkinson	6 ft 3 in (1.91 m)	Sr	New Mexico	Dallas, TX
F	33	Caiyle Kaupu	6 ft 0 in (1.83 m)	Sr	Konawaena High School	Holualoa, HI

Head coach

- Tamara Inoue (Long Beach State)

Assistant coach(es)

- Cecilia Russell-Nava (New Mexico State)
- Derek Wynn (Cal State Fullerton)
- Tyler Ellis (New Mexico State)

Legend

- (C) Team captain
- (S) Suspended
- (I) Ineligible
- (W) Walk-on
- Injured
- Current redshirt

Roster
Last update: January 16, 2024

== Schedule and results ==
Date time, TV	Rank^{#}	Opponent^{#}	Result	Record	High points	High rebounds	High assists	Site (attendance) city, state
Non-conference regular season
November 7, 2023*; 6:00 p.m., ESPN+		at Pepperdine	L 58–63	0–1	23 – Lee	9 – Parkinson	3 – Konate	Firestone Fieldhouse (237); Malibu, CA
November 11, 2023*; 2:00 p.m., ESPN+		Seattle	W 74–43	1–1	17 – 2 tied	7 – Parkinson	5 – 2 tied	Bren Events Center (647); Irvine, CA
November 14, 2023*; 6:30 p.m., ESPN+		at Saint Mary's	L 37–52	1–2	9 – 2 tied	8 – Parkinson	5 – Lee	University Credit Union Pavilion (311); Moraga, CA
November 20, 2023*; 6:00 p.m., ESPN+		Eastern Washington	W 71–63	2–2	15 – 2 tied	8 – Parkinson	8 – Konate	Bren Events Center (537); Irvine, CA
November 24, 2023*; 1:00 p.m., ESPN+		vs. St. Thomas; Tiger Turkey Tip-Off	W 74–63	3–2	23 – Lee	6 – Dean	7 – Konate	Alex G. Spanos Center (253); Stockton, CA
November 25, 2023*; 3:30 p.m., ESPN+		at Pacific; Tiger Turkey Tip-Off	W 66–60	4–2	15 – Tom	5 – 2 tied	3 – Konate	Alex G. Spanos Center (506); Stockton, CA
November 29, 2023*; 4:00 p.m., ESPN+		at Texas Tech	L 54–60	4–3	21 – Johnson Sidi Baba	7 – Tom	3 – Konate	United Supermarkets Arena (4,258); Lubbock, TX
December 2, 2023*; 2:00 p.m., ESPN+		Denver	W 50–47	5–3	8 – 2 tied	11 – Parkinson	3 – 2 tied	Bren Events Center (587); Irvine, CA
December 5, 2023*; 5:00 p.m., ESPN+		at New Mexico State	W 61–55	6–3	16 – Nahum	9 – Johnson Sidi Baba	3 – Konate	Pan American Center (478); Las Cruces, NM
December 16, 2023*; 7:00 p.m., ESPN+		vs. Colorado State; Beach Classic	L 63–69	6–4	19 – Johnson Sidi Baba	11 – Johnson Sidi Baba	3 – Konate	Walter Pyramid (834); Long Beach, CA
Big West regular season
December 28, 2023; 6:00 p.m., ESPN+		at UC Riverside	W 67–52	7–4 (1–0)	18 – Konate	7 – Parkinson	4 – 2 tied	SRC Arena (137); Riverside, CA
December 30, 2023; 2:00 p.m., ESPN+		Cal State Bakersfield	W 71–48	8–4 (2–0)	22 – Lee	9 – Johnson Sidi Baba	6 – Konate	Bren Events Center (580); Irvine, CA
January 4, 2024; 7:00 p.m., ESPN+		at Cal State Fullerton	W 68–44	9–4 (3–0)	18 – Johnson Sidi Baba	10 – Parkinson	4 – Nahum	Titan Gym (172); Fullerton, CA
January 6, 2024; 3:00 p.m., SPECTSN/ESPN+		at UC Davis	L 57–60	9–5 (3–1)	17 – Lee	5 – Scharpf	3 – Tom	University Credit Union Center (1,012); Davis, CA
January 11, 2024; 6:00 p.m., ESPN+		Hawaii	L 49–56	9–6 (3–2)	15 – Lee	8 – Parkinson	9 – Lee	Bren Events Center (640); Irvine, CA
January 18, 2024; 7:00 p.m., ESPN+		at UC San Diego	W 57–49	10–6 (4–2)	14 – Johnson Sidi Baba	6 – Johnson Sidi Baba	5 – Konate	LionTree Arena (518); La Jolla, CA
January 20, 2024; 2:00 p.m., ESPN+		UC Davis	W 79–61	11–6 (5–2)	15 – 2 tied	8 – Parkinson	7 – Konate	Bren Events Center (889); Irvine, CA
January 25, 2024; 11:00 a.m., ESPN+		Long Beach State	W 74–59	12–6 (6–2)	13 – Parkinson	9 – Parkinson	6 – Konate	Bren Events Center (2,294); Irvine, CA
January 27, 2024; 2:00 p.m., ESPN+		at Cal State Northridge	W 67–63	13–6 (7-2)	16 – Lee	10 – Parkinson	4 – 3 tied	Premier America Credit Union Arena; Northridge, CA
February 1, 2024; 6:00 p.m., ESPN+		Cal Poly	W 2–0 (Forfeit)	13–6 (8–2)	–	–	–	Bren Events Center; Irvine, CA
February 3, 2024; 9:00 p.m., ESPN+		at Hawaii	L 43-55	13–7 (8–3)	21 – Lee	8 – Johnson Sidi Baba	2 – Lee	Stan Sheriff Center (2,171); Honolulu, HI
February 8, 2024; 6:00 p.m., ESPN+		UC Santa Barbara	W 60–38	14–7 (9–3)	10 – 3 tied	8 – Tom	4 – Konate	Bren Events Center (643); Irvine, CA
February 10, 2024; 2:00 p.m., ESPN+		UC Riverside	W 62–53	15–7 (10–3)	15 – Lee	10 – Parkinson	6 – Lee	Bren Events Center (789); Irvine, CA
February 17, 2024; 2:00 p.m., ESPN+		at Cal State Bakersfield	W 72–68	16–7 (11–3)	16 – Parkinson	15 – Johnson Sidi Baba	4 – Tom	Icardo Center (491); Bakersfield, CA
February 22, 2024; 7:00 p.m., ESPN+		at UC Santa Barbara	W 54–46	17–7 (12–3)	14 – Lee	6 – Johnson Sidi Baba	4 – Konate	The Thunderdome (782); Santa Barbara, CA
February 24, 2024; 2:00 p.m., ESPN+		UC San Diego	L 65–69	17–8 (12–4)	18 – Lee	8 – Parkinson	9 – Konate	Bren Events Center (837); Irvine, CA
February 29, 2024; 6:00 p.m., ESPN+		Cal State Northridge	W 64-54	18-8 (13-4)	20 – Lee	12 – Johnson Sidi Baba	3 – Lee	Bren Events Center (524); Irvine, CA
March 2, 2024; 2:00 p.m., ESPN+		at Long Beach State	W 86–76 ^{OT}	19–8 (14–4)	29 – Lee	12 – Johnson Sidi Baba	5 – 2 tied	Walter Pyramid (819); Long Beach, CA
March 7, 2024; 7:00 p.m., ESPN+		at Cal Poly	W 65-31	20–8 (15–4)	14 – 2 tied	10 – Parkinson	3 – 2 tied	Mott Athletics Center (827); San Luis Obispo, CA
March 9, 2024; 2:00 p.m., ESPN+		Cal State Fullerton	W 69–53	21–8 (16–4)	20 – Johnson Sidi Baba	9 – Johnson Sidi Baba	7 – Konate	Bren Events Center (890); Irvine, CA
Big West tournament
March 15, 2024; 2:30 p.m., ESPN+	(2)	vs. (7) Long Beach State; Semifinals	W 69–57	22–8	22 – Johnson Sidi Baba	10 – Johnson Sidi Baba	4 – 2 tied	Dollar Loan Center (1,237); Henderson, NV
March 16, 2024; 3:00 p.m., ESPN+	(2)	vs. (5) UC Davis; Championship game	W 53–39	23–8	21 – Lee	9 – Johnson Sidi Baba	3 – Konate	Dollar Loan Center; Henderson, NV
NCAA women's tournament
March 23, 2024*; 4:30 p.m., ESPN2	(13 P4)	at (4 P4) No. 16 Gonzaga; First round	L 56–75	23–9	18 – Parkinson	12 – Johnson Sidi Baba	2 – 2 tied	McCarthey Athletic Center (6,000); Spokane, WA
*Non-conference game. ^{#}Rankings from AP poll. (#) Tournament seedings in parentheses. All times are in Pacific.
