= 2023–24 Long Beach State Beach women's basketball team =

American college basketball season

2023–24 Long Beach State Beach women's basketball
- Conference: Big West Conference
- Record: 15–18 (8–12 Big West)
- Head coach: Amy Wright (1st season)
- Assistant coaches: Brian Rosario; Jashae Lee; Raru Archer
- Home arena: Walter Pyramid

2023–24 Big West women's basketball standings
	Conf.				Overall
Team	W		L	PCT	W		L	PCT
Hawai'i	17	–	3	.850	20	–	12	.625
UC Irvine †	16	–	4	.800	23	–	9	.719
UC Riverside	13	–	7	.650	18	–	14	.563
Cal Poly	13	–	7	.650	17	–	14	.548
UC Davis	13	–	7	.650	20	–	14	.588
UC Santa Barbara	10	–	10	.500	16	–	15	.516
UC San Diego*	8	–	12	.400	12	–	19	.387
Long Beach State	8	–	12	.400	15	–	18	.455
Cal State Fullerton	6	–	14	.300	10	–	21	.323
Cal State Bakersfield	5	–	15	.250	8	–	21	.276
Cal State Northridge	1	–	19	.050	3	–	27	.100
† 2024 Big West tournament winner * ineligible for the 2024 NCAA tournament due to transition period

The 2023–24 Long Beach State Beach women's basketball team represented California State University, Long Beach during the 2023–24 NCAA Division I women's basketball season. The Beach, led by first-year head coach Amy Wright, played their home games at the Walter Pyramid in Long Beach, California as members of the Big West Conference.

== Previous season ==
The Beach finished the 2022–23 season 23–10, 17–3 in Big West play, to finish in second place. As the #2 seed in the Big West tournament, they defeated #10 seed UC Riverside in the quarterfinals, before falling to #3 seed and eventual tournament champions Hawaii in the semifinals. They received an at-large bid into the WNIT, where they lost to San Diego in the first round.

On March 29, 2023, head coach Jeff Cammon announced that he would be stepping down, in order to take the head coaching position at Saint Mary's. On April 17, Oklahoma associate head coach Amy Wright was named the Beach's next head coach.

== Roster ==
2023–24 Long Beach State Beach women's basketball team
Players
Coaches

Pos.	#	Name	Height	Year	Previous school	Hometown
G	0	Lauren Cummings	6 ft 0 in (1.83 m)	Fr	Billings Senior High School	Billings, MT
G	1	Lovely Sonnier	6 ft 0 in (1.83 m)	Jr	South Carolina State	San Francisco, CA
G	2	Savannah Tucker	5 ft 9 in (1.75 m)	Jr	Clovis North High School	Fresno, CA
G	3	Patricia Chung	5 ft 8 in (1.73 m)	Jr	Mark Keppel High School	Monterey Park, CA
G	4	Cheyenne Givens	5 ft 7 in (1.7 m)	GS	Cal State Northridge	Los Angeles, CA
F	5	Kennan Ka	6 ft 0 in (1.83 m)	So	Mission Hills High School	San Diego, CA
G	10	Casey Valenti Paea	5 ft 9 in (1.75 m)	RS Jr	Buffalo	Melbourne, Australia
F	12	Jada Crawshaw	6 ft 0 in (1.83 m)	Fr	Sydney Comets	Darwin, Australia
F	21	Abby Shoff	6 ft 0 in (1.83 m)	So	Enterprise High School	Redding, CA
G	22	Sydney Woodley	5 ft 8 in (1.73 m)	Jr	Cal State Northridge	Menifee, CA
G	30	Olivia Moore	5 ft 8 in (1.73 m)	So	Mead High School	Spokane, WA
F	52	Davai Matthews	6 ft 3 in (1.91 m)	So	Wayne Memorial High School	Detroit, MI

Head coach

- Amy Wright (Arkansas)

Assistant coach(es)

- Brian Rosario (San Diego)
- Jashae Lee (Murray State)
- Raru Archer (Texas Southern)

Legend

- (C) Team captain
- (S) Suspended
- (I) Ineligible
- (W) Walk-on
- Injured
- Current redshirt

Roster
Last update: January 18, 2024

== Schedule and results ==
Date time, TV	Rank^{#}	Opponent^{#}	Result	Record	High points	High rebounds	High assists	Site (attendance) city, state
Non-conference regular season
November 8, 2023*; 6:00 p.m., ESPN+		Biola	W 82–62	1–0	25 – Tucker	9 – Shoff	8 – Chung	Walter Pyramid (747); Long Beach, CA
November 12, 2023*; 1:00 p.m., ESPN+		Nevada	W 79–57	2–0	18 – Shoff	9 – Shoff	2 – 5 tied	Walter Pyramid (1,050); Long Beach, CA
November 15, 2023*; 6:00 p.m., ESPN+		at California Baptist	L 71–82	2–1	17 – Givens	7 – Woodley	6 – Valenti Paea	Fowler Events Center (590); Riverside, CA
November 21, 2023*; 6:00 p.m., MWN		at Fresno State	L 64–74	2–2	17 – Givens	7 – Tucker	3 – Chung	Save Mart Center (1,233); Fresno, CA
November 27, 2023*; 6:00 p.m., ESPN+		at Pepperdine	W 68–53	3–2	14 – Tucker	6 – Givens	4 – Chung	Firestone Fieldhouse (103); Malibu, CA
December 6, 2023*; 5:00 p.m., LHN		at No. 5 Texas	L 62–106	3–3	22 – Tucker	5 – Sonnier	3 – Valenti Paea	Moody Center (5,087); Austin, TX
December 15, 2023*; 6:00 p.m., ESPN+		Colorado State; Beach Classic	W 77–76	2–5	19 – 2 tied	10 – Chung	3 – 2 tied	Walter Pyramid (340); Long Beach, CA
December 16, 2023*; 5:00 p.m., ESPN+		Pacific; Beach Classic	L 86–90	4–4	20 – Valenti Paea	7 – Woodley	5 – 2 tied	Walter Pyramid; Long Beach, CA
December 19, 2023*; 4:00 p.m., ESPN+		San Francisco	W 81–79	5–4	17 – Tucker	8 – Matthews	5 – Matthews	Walter Pyramid (547); Long Beach, CA
December 21, 2023*; 2:00 p.m., ESPN+		No. 6 USC	L 77–85	5–5	17 – Tucker	10 – Crawshaw	2 – 4 tied	Walter Pyramid (1,243); Long Beach, CA
Big West regular season
December 28, 2023; 7:00 p.m., ESPN+		Cal State Fullerton	L 61–67	5–6 (0–1)	17 – Valenti Paea	6 – 3 tied	4 – Valenti Paea	Walter Pyramid (730); Long Beach, CA
December 30, 2023; 2:00 p.m., ESPN+		at Cal State Northridge	W 76–58	6–6 (1–1)	19 – Givens	10 – Woodley	3 – Woodley	Premier America Credit Union Arena (159); Northridge, CA
January 4, 2024; 7:00 p.m., ESPN+		Cal Poly	L 56–64	6–7 (1–2)	13 – Tucker	8 – Matthews	5 – Valenti Paea	Walter Pyramid (569); Long Beach, CA
January 6, 2024; 6:00 p.m., ESPN+		at UC Riverside	L 43–49	6–8 (1–3)	11 – Valenti Paea	10 – Valenti Paea	5 – Valenti Paea	SRC Arena (121); Riverside, CA
January 11, 2024; 7:00 p.m., ESPN+		UC San Diego	L 30–45	6–9 (1–4)	8 – Sonnier	8 – Crawshaw	1 – 3 tied	Walter Pyramid (535); Long Beach, CA
January 13, 2024; 3:00 p.m., ESPN+		UC Santa Barbara	L 56–69	6–10 (1–5)	14 – Valenti Paea	7 – Chung	4 – Givens	Walter Pyramid (853); Long Beach, CA
January 18, 2024; 9:00 p.m., ESPN+		at Hawaii	L 55-68	6–11 (1–6)	16 – Tucker	7 – Chung	3 – Woodley	Stan Sheriff Center (1,567); Honolulu, HI
January 25, 2024; 11:00 a.m., ESPN+		at UC Irvine	L 59–74	6–12 (1–7)	16 – Valenti Paea	9 – Chung	4 – Chung	Bren Events Center (2,294); Irvine, CA
January 27, 2024; 3:00 p.m., ESPN+		UC Riverside	W 54–52	7–12 (2–7)	18 – Woodley	7 – Woodley	3 – 2 tied	Walter Pyramid; Long Beach, CA
February 1, 2024; 7:00 p.m., ESPN+		Cal State Bakersfield	W 70–57	8–12 (3–7)	24 – Chung	12 – Crawshaw	5 – Chung	Walter Pyramid (517); Long Beach, CA
February 3, 2024; 2:00 p.m., ESPN+		at UC San Diego	L 45–78	8–13 (3–8)	14 – Valenti Paea	6 – Valenti Paea	3 – Chung	LionTree Arena (568); La Jolla, CA
February 10, 2024; 2:00 p.m., ESPN+		at Cal Poly	L 76–84	8–14 (3–9)	17 – Crawshaw	7 – Tucker	3 – 2 tied	Mott Athletics Center (1,294); San Luis Obispo, CA
February 15, 2024; 7:00 p.m., SPECTSN/ESPN+		UC Davis	W 78–52	9–14 (4–9)	17 – Valenti Paea	8 – 2 tied	3 – 2 tied	Walter Pyramid (661); Long Beach, CA
February 17, 2024; 3:00 p.m., ESPN+		Cal State Northridge	W 86–62	10–14 (5–9)	21 – Woodley	10 – Crawshaw	4 – 2 tied	Walter Pyramid (1,002); Long Beach, CA
February 22, 2024; 7:00 p.m., ESPN+		at Cal State Bakersfield	W 69–67	11–14 (6–9)	20 – Tucker	10 – Matthews	4 – Tucker	Icardo Center (515); Bakersfield, CA
February 24, 2024; 3:00 p.m., SPECTSN/ESPN+		Hawaii	L 68–80	11–15 (6–10)	14 – Givens	8 – Woodley	4 – Chung	Walter Pyramid (1,504); Long Beach, CA
February 29, 2024; 7:00 p.m., ESPN+		at Cal State Fullerton	W 74–59	12–15 (7–10)	16 – Valenti Paea	8 – Crawshaw	4 – Valenti Paea	Titan Gym; Fullerton, CA
March 2, 2024; 2:00 p.m., ESPN+		UC Irvine	L 76–86 ^{OT}	12–16 (7–11)	21 – Woodley	9 – 2 tied	11 – Valenti Paea	Walter Pyramid (819); Long Beach, CA
March 7, 2024; 7:00 p.m., ESPN+		at UC Santa Barbara	W 75–69	13–16 (8–11)	17 – Tucker	6 – Woodley	5 – Chung	The Thunderdome (678); Santa Barbara, CA
March 9, 2024; 1:00 p.m., ESPN+		at UC Davis	L 58–70	13–17 (8–12)	11 – Tucker	6 – Crawshaw	2 – Tucker	University Credit Union Center (917); Davis, CA
Big West tournament
March 13, 2024; 2:30 p.m., ESPN+	(7)	vs. (6) UC Santa Barbara; First round	W 90–75	14–17	17 – Tucker	10 – Chung	6 – Woodley	Dollar Loan Center (557); Henderson, NV
March 14, 2024; 12:00 p.m., ESPN+	(7)	vs. (3) UC Riverside; Quarterfinals	W 83–75 ^{OT}	15–17	20 – Chung	10 – Woodley	4 – 2 tied	Dollar Loan Center (580); Henderson, NV
March 15, 2024; 2:30 p.m., ESPN+	(7)	vs. (2) UC Irvine; Semifinals	L 57–69	15–18	13 – Valenti Paea	7 – Sonnier	3 – Sonnier	Dollar Loan Center (1,239); Henderson, NV
*Non-conference game. ^{#}Rankings from AP poll. (#) Tournament seedings in parentheses. All times are in Pacific.
