= 2024 Big West Conference women's basketball tournament =

- Classification: Division I
- Season: 2023–24
- Teams: 8
- Site: Dollar Loan Center; Henderson, Nevada
- Champions: UC Irvine (2nd title)
- Winning coach: Tamara Inoue (1st title)
- MVP: Déja Lee (UC Irvine)
- Television: ESPN+

2023–24 Big West women's basketball standings
	Conf.				Overall
Team	W		L	PCT	W		L	PCT
Hawai'i	17	–	3	.850	20	–	12	.625
UC Irvine †	16	–	4	.800	23	–	9	.719
UC Riverside	13	–	7	.650	18	–	14	.563
Cal Poly	13	–	7	.650	17	–	14	.548
UC Davis	13	–	7	.650	20	–	14	.588
UC Santa Barbara	10	–	10	.500	16	–	15	.516
UC San Diego*	8	–	12	.400	12	–	19	.387
Long Beach State	8	–	12	.400	15	–	18	.455
Cal State Fullerton	6	–	14	.300	10	–	21	.323
Cal State Bakersfield	5	–	15	.250	8	–	21	.276
Cal State Northridge	1	–	19	.050	3	–	27	.100
† 2024 Big West tournament winner * ineligible for the 2024 NCAA tournament due to transition period

The 2024 Big West Conference women's basketball tournament was the postseason women's basketball tournament for the Big West Conference of the 2023–24 NCAA Division I women's basketball season. It was held March 13–16, 2024, at the Dollar Loan Center in Henderson, Nevada. The winner received the conference's automatic bid to the 2024 NCAA tournament.

== Seeds ==
In June 2023, the Big West Conference board of directors voted to reduce the tournament field from 10 teams to 8 teams. In the new format, the top two seeds receive automatic berths in the semifinals, the next two seeds are placed in the quarterfinals, and the remaining four seeds play each other in the first round. Big West commissioner Dan Butterly stated that the decision was made to improve the regular season champion's odds of winning the tournament and thus receiving the automatic bid to the NCAA tournament.

Of the 11 conference teams, 10 were eligible for tournament spots. UC San Diego is ineligible for the tournament, as it is in the final year of the four-year transition required for teams transferring to Division I from Division II. Teams are seeded based on their performance within the conference, and teams with identical conference records are seeded using a tiebreaker system.

As is the case since 2020, reseeding teams does not occur at any point.

Seed	School	Record	Tiebreaker
1	Hawai'i	17–3	
2	UC Irvine	16–4	
3	UC Riverside	13–7	2–0 vs. Cal Poly, 1–1 vs. UC Davis
4	Cal Poly	13–7	2–0 vs. UC Davis, 0–2 vs. UC Riverside
5	UC Davis	13–7	1–1 vs. UC Riverside, 0–2 vs. Cal Poly
6	UC Santa Barbara	10–10	
7	Long Beach State	8–12	
8	Cal State Fullerton	6–14	
DNQ	Cal State Bakersfield	5–15	
DNQ	Cal State Northridge	1–19	

== Schedule and results ==
Game	Time	Matchup	Score	Television
First round – Wednesday, March 13
1	Noon	No. 5 UC Davis vs. No. 8 Cal State Fullerton	81–56	ESPN+
2	2:30 PM	No. 6 UC Santa Barbara vs. No. 7 Long Beach State	75–90	ESPN+
Quarterfinals – Thursday, March 14
3	Noon	No. 3 UC Riverside vs. No. 7 Long Beach State	75–83^{OT}	ESPN+
4	2:30 PM	No. 4 Cal Poly vs. No. 5 UC Davis	48–56	ESPN+
Semifinals – Friday, March 15
5	Noon	No. 1 Hawai'i vs. No.5 UC Davis	48–51	ESPN+
6	2:30 PM	No. 2 UC Irvine vs. No. 7 Long Beach State	69–57	ESPN+
Final – Saturday, March 16
7	3:00 PM	No. 5 UC Davis vs. No. 2 UC Irvine	39-53	ESPN+
*Game times in PDT. Rankings denote tournament seed.

== Bracket ==
First Round; Wednesday, March 13
5	UC Davis	81
8	Cal State Fullerton	56
6	UC Santa Barbara	75
7	Long Beach State	90

Quarterfinals; Thursday, March 14
4	Cal Poly	48
5	UC Davis	56
3	UC Riverside	75
7	Long Beach State	83*

Semifinals; Friday, March 15
1	Hawai'i	48
5	UC Davis	51
2	UC Irvine	69
7	Long Beach State	57

Championship; Saturday, March 16
5	UC Davis	39
2	UC Irvine	53

Note: * denotes overtime
