= Amy Wright (basketball) =

American basketball coach

Current position
- Title: Associate head coach
- Team: Alabama
- Conference: SEC

Biographical details
- Born: February 19, 1980 (age 46); Williamsburg, Indiana, U.S.

Playing career
- 1999–2002: Arkansas
- Position: Point guard

Coaching career (HC unless noted)
- 2004–2006: South Florida (assistant)
- 2007–2008: Western Kentucky (assistant)
- 2008–2010: Cleveland State (assistant)
- 2010–2011: Cleveland State (associate HC)
- 2011–2012: Arizona State (assistant)
- 2012–2021: Texas A&M (assistant)
- 2021–2023: Oklahoma (associate HC)
- 2023–2026: Long Beach State
- 2026–present: Alabama (associate HC)

Administrative career (AD unless noted)
- 2003–2004: South Florida (DBO)

Head coaching record
- Overall: 36–57 (.387)

Amy Wright (born February 19, 1980) is an American basketball coach who is currently the associate head women's basketball coach at the University of Alabama, a role that she has held since April 2026. She previously was the head basketball coach for the women's team at Long Beach State from April 2023 until April 2026.

== Arkansas statistics ==
Legend
GP	Games played	GS	Games started	MPG	Minutes per game
FG%	Field goal percentage	3P%	3-point field goal percentage	FT%	Free throw percentage
RPG	Rebounds per game	APG	Assists per game	SPG	Steals per game
BPG	Blocks per game	PPG	Points per game	**Bold**	Career high

Year	Team	GP	Points	FG%	3P%	FT%	RPG	APG	SPG	BPG	PPG
1998-99	Arkansas	**34**	131	35.7%	20.0%	64.6%	1.8	5.1	1.1	0.1	3.9
1999-00	Arkansas	32	144	38.2%	**32.3%**	**67.8%**	1.6	4.4	1.1	0.1	4.5
2000-01	Arkansas	33	**239**	**45.7%**	30.0%	60.8%	**3.2**	6.0	1.6	**0.4**	**7.2**
2001-02	Arkansas	32	211	32.7%	21.2%	65.0%	3.1	**6.3**	**2.2**	0.2	6.6
Career		131	725	38.2%	25.6%	64.1%	2.4	5.5	1.5	0.2	5.5

== Coaching career ==
Wright began her coaching career at South Florida as an assistant coach after serving as director of basketball operations for one season. She also had stints as an assistant coach at Western Kentucky, Cleveland State, Arizona State, and Texas A&M prior to being named the associate head coach at Oklahoma prior to the start of the 2021–22 season.

Wright was named the head coach at Long Beach State on April 17, 2023. She finished with a 36–57 record at Long Beach State, as she left after the 2025–2026 season to take a role as the associate head coach at Alabama.

== Head coaching record ==
Record table
Season	Team	Overall	Conference	Standing	Postseason
**Long Beach State Beach** (Big West Conference) (2023–2026)
2023–24	Long Beach State	15–18	8–12	T–7th	
2024–25	Long Beach State	16–14	12–8	T–5th	
2025–26	Long Beach State	5–25	4–16	9th	
Long Beach State:		36–57 (.387)	24–36 (.400)		
Total:		36–57 (.387)			
National champion Postseason invitational champion Conference regular season champion Conference regular season and conference tournament champion Division regular season champion Division regular season and conference tournament champion Conference tournament champion
