= Greg McCall =

American basketball player and coach

Current position
- Title: Head coach
- Team: Bakersfield
- Conference: Western State
- Record: 0–0 (–)

Playing career
- 1989–1990: Northwestern State
- 1990–1991: Cal State Bakersfield

Coaching career (HC unless noted)

Men's basketball
- ?–1997: Cal State Bakersfield
- 2024–present: Bakersfield

Women's basketball
- 1997–2007: Taft
- 2007–2011: Cal State Bakersfield (assistant)
- 2011–2024: Cal State Bakersfield

Head coaching record
- Overall: 160–210 (.432) (NCAA)

Greg McCall is an American basketball coach and former player who is the current head coach of the Bakersfield Renegades men's basketball team. Prior to joining Bakersfield College, he was the head women's basketball coach at Cal State Bakersfield for 13 seasons.

== Coaching career ==
On March 12, 2024, Cal State Bakersfield announced that they would not be renewing McCall's contract after a 2023–24 season where the team finished second last in the Big West with an 8–21 record. Through 13 seasons he had a record of 166–210, including two Women's National Invitation Tournament appearances in 2014 and 2015.

McCall was subsequently hired as the men's basketball head coach at Bakersfield College in August 2024.

== Personal life ==
McCall is married with six children. His eldest daughter DeWanna attended Auburn and was drafted by the Phoenix Mercury in the 2009 WNBA draft, while his second eldest daughter Erica attended Stanford, before being drafted by the Indiana Fever in the 2017 WNBA draft.
