= Jeff Harada =

American basketball coach (born 1970)

Current position
- Title: Associate head coach
- Team: Long Beach State
- Conference: Big West

Biographical details
- Born: November 24, 1971 (age 54); Honolulu, Hawaii
- Education: Colorado (1995)

Coaching career (HC unless noted)

Men's basketball
- 1997–1999: Colorado (volunteer asst.)
- 2004–2007: Hawaii Pacific (asst.)

Women's basketball
- 2007–2011: Hawaii Pacific
- 2011–2014: Navy (asst.)
- 2014–2017: Central Washington
- 2017–2025: Cal State Fullerton
- 2026–present: Long Beach State (associate HC)

Administrative career (AD unless noted)
- 1999–2001: Colorado (director of basketball ops.)
- 2004–2007: Hawaii Pacific (SID)
- 2007–2011: Hawaii Pacific (associate AD)

Head coaching record
- Overall: 187–237 (.441)
- Tournaments: 0–1 (NCAA D-II)

Accomplishments and honors

Championships
- PacWest (2010)

Awards
- PacWest Coach of the Year (2010)

Jeff Harada (born November 24, 1970) is an American basketball coach who is currently the associate head coach for the Long Beach State Beach women's basketball program. He was previously the head coach of the women's basketball team at California State University, Fullerton.

== Coaching career ==
Harada began his coaching career at Colorado as a volunteer assistant with the men's basketball team. He was promoted to director of basketball operations in 1999.

=== Hawaii Pacific ===
Harada joined the men's basketball staff at Hawaii Pacific in 2004 as an assistant coach, and was named the women's basketball head coach in 2007. As head coach, Harada turned around a program that had only won two games the season prior to his hiring into a team that made it to the NCAA Division II Tournament in his third season (2009–10). Harada was also named the PacWest coach of the year in that same season. During his tenure at HPU (2007–11), Harada coached one all-region and eight all-conference (Pacific West) players in four years, including two freshman of the year and one newcomer of the year. While at Hawaii Pacific, he also served as their sports information director and later associate athletics director of compliance.

=== Navy ===
Harada was hired to be an assistant coach at Navy in 2011. In his three seasons there, the team advanced to two NCAA Tournaments and one NIT Tournament, winning the Patriot League Championship twice.

=== Central Washington ===
Harada was named the head coach at Central Washington University in 2014. At Central Washington, the Wildcats won 44 games in three seasons under Harada after only winning 25 in the previous three seasons. In his first year at Central, Harada nearly doubled the Wildcats' overall win total and nearly tripled their conference win total from the previous season. In his second year, the Wildcats saw the highest overall win total since 2006 (17) and highest conference win total since 2004 (10). Harada coached two GNAC Freshmen of the Year (2015, 2016) and seven all-GNAC selections in his three years at CWU.

=== Cal State Fullerton ===
Harada was named the head coach at Cal State Fullerton in 2017. In his first season he finished with more overall and Big West Conference wins than the previous two seasons combined. In year two, he nearly doubled the win total from the previous year and their 14 wins were the most since the 2009-10 season. After leading the program to their first winning season in nearly 30 years in year three, he signed an extension that put him under contract until the 2025 season.

=== Long Beach State ===
Harada was hired at Long Beach State prior to the start of the 2026–27 season to be the program's associate head coach.

== Head coaching record ==
Record table
Season	Team	Overall	Conference	Standing	Postseason
Hawaii Pacific Sharks (Pacific West Conference) (2007–2011)
2007–08	Hawaii Pacific	8–19	8–10	4th	
2008–09	Hawaii Pacific	14–15	8–5	5th	
2009–10	Hawaii Pacific	18–7	11–2	1st	NCAA Division II First Round
2010–11	Hawaii Pacific	18–7	12–4	3rd	
Hawaii Pacific:		58–48 (.547)	39–21 (.650)		
Central Washington Wildcats (Great Northwest Athletic Conference) (2014–2017)
2014–15	Central Washington	12–15	7–11	6th	
2015–16	Central Washington	17–12	10–11	5th	
2016–17	Central Washington	15–15	10–11	6th	
Central Washington:		44–42 (.512)	27–33 (.450)		
Cal State Fullerton Titans (Big West Conference) (2017–2025)
2017–18	Cal State Fullerton	8–21	3–13	9th	
2018–19	Cal State Fullerton	14–16	6–10	6th	
2019–20	Cal State Fullerton	17–14	8–8	6th	
2020–21	Cal State Fullerton	4–18	2–14	9th	
2021–22	Cal State Fullerton	11–18	5–12	7th	
2022–23	Cal State Fullerton	14–16	9–11	6th	
2023–24	Cal State Fullerton	10–21	6–14	9th	
2024–25	Cal State Fullerton	7–23	5–15	9th	
Cal State Fullerton:		85–147 (.366)	44–97 (.312)		
Total:		187–237 (.441)			
National champion Postseason invitational champion Conference regular season champion Conference regular season and conference tournament champion Division regular season champion Division regular season and conference tournament champion Conference tournament champion
