= University Credit Union Center =

Arena in California, United States

- The Pavilion
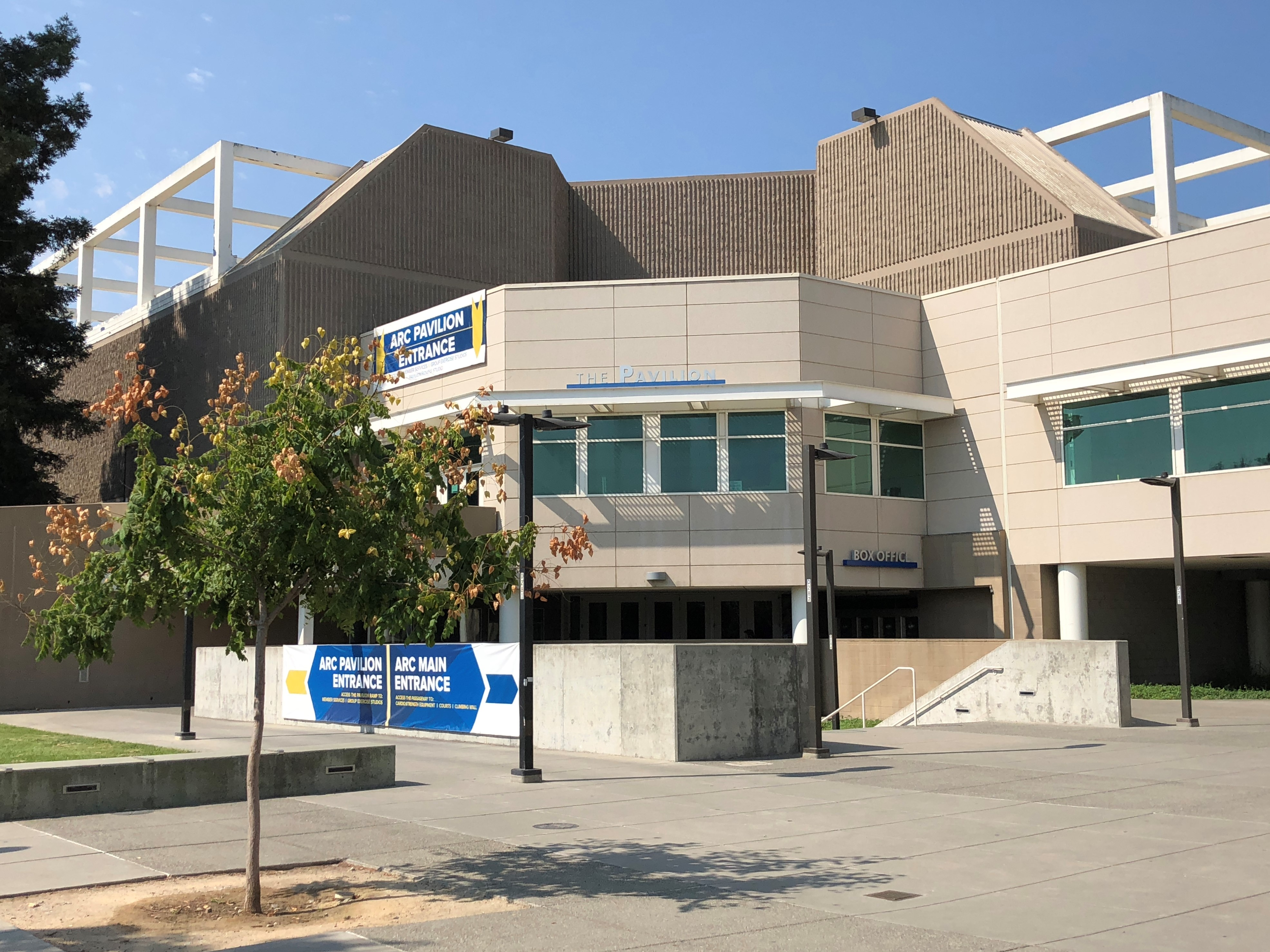
- Interactive map of University Credit Union Center
- Full name: University Credit Union Center
- Former names: Recreation Hall (1977–2004), Pavilion at the ARC (2004-2021)
- Location: 232 ARC, 1 Shields Avenue; Davis, CA 95616
- Coordinates: 38°32′30″N 121°45′34″W
- Owner: University of California, Davis
- Operator: University of California, Davis
- Capacity: 7,600 (5867 seated bleacher capacity, 2010 renovation; 6,003 for basketball and volleyball)
- Surface: Hardwood (Maple)
- Record attendance: 7,926 on January 23, 1999 for Men's Basketball

Construction
- Opened: 1977

Tenants
- UC Davis Aggies men's basketball UC Davis Aggies women's basketball UC Davis Aggies women's volleyball UC Davis Aggies women's gymnastics

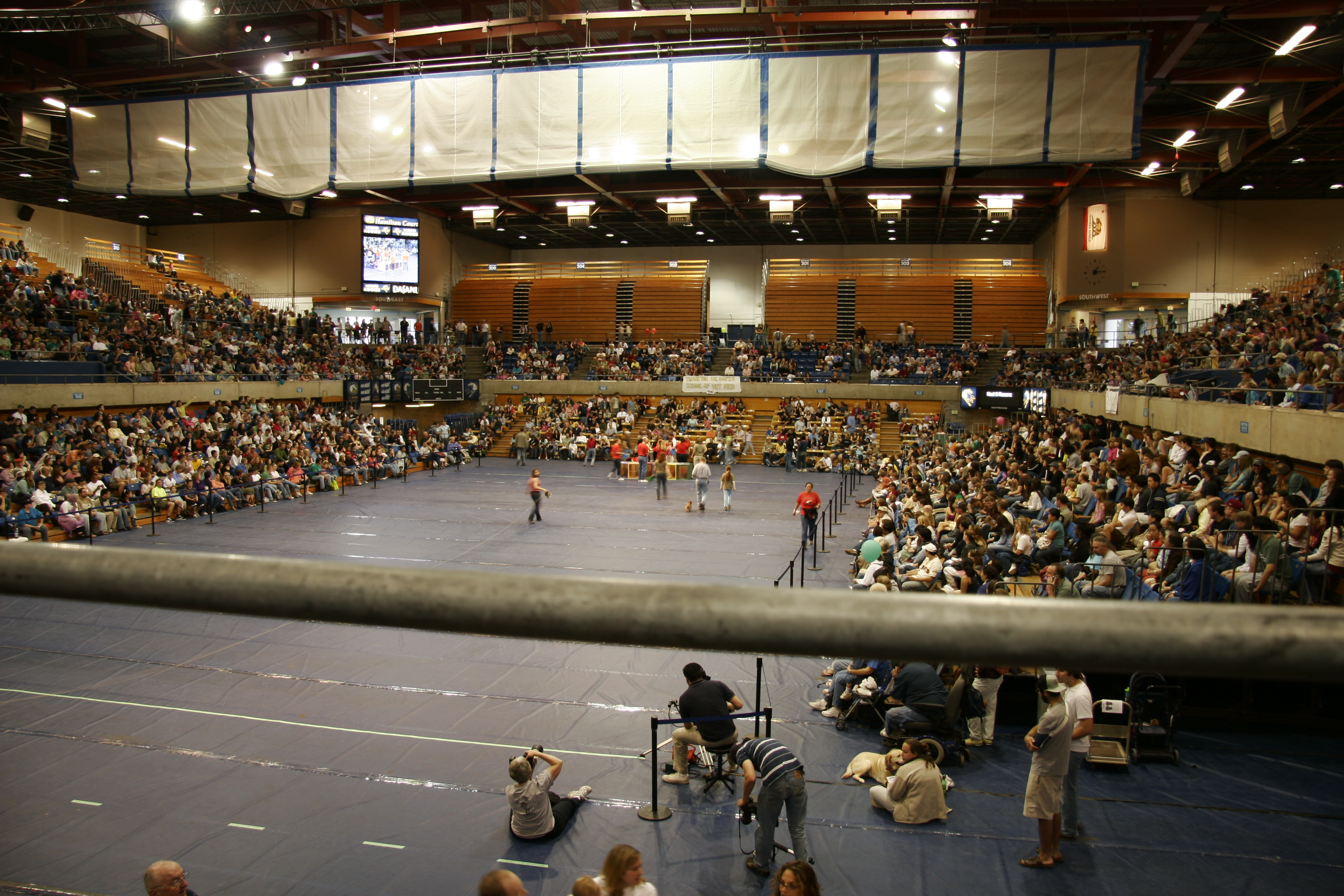
Interior of The Pavilion at ARC

The University Credit Union Center (previously known as Recreation Hall and The Pavilion at the ARC and commonly known as The Pavilion) is a 7,600-seat indoor multi-purpose stadium on the campus of the University of California, Davis in unincorporated Yolo County, California.

== History and renovations ==
Recreation Hall was opened in 1977 for intercollegiate athletics, as well as other large events such as intramural sports and public events. The capacity of the University Credit Union Center for basketball is over 6,000 people and can provide 150,000 square feet (14,000 m^{2}) of floorspace.

In Spring of 2004, UC Davis opened the Activities and Recreation Center (ARC). This structure served as a massive extension to the currently existing Pavilion. Since the two buildings have been fused into one massive complex, Recreation Hall's name was changed to The Pavilion at ARC upon the opening of the ARC in 2004.

As of July 2021, the Pavilion is known as the University Credit Union Center for sponsorship reasons. As part of UC Davis' 10-year sponsorship agreement with University Credit Union, a Daktronics videoboard was added to provide game statistics and live replays for Aggie sporting events.

== Tenants ==
The main tenants of The Pavilion are the UC Davis Aggies athletic programs. The UC Davis Aggies men's basketball, women's basketball, women's volleyball and women's gymnastics teams call The Pavilion home.

It was the home of the UC Davis Aggies wrestling team until the program was discontinued in 2010.

=== Break the Record Night ===
An annual "Break the Record Night" is held during each basketball season to attempt to break the prior attendance record for a basketball game. The current record of 7,926 was set on January 23, 1999, when UC Davis defeated Chico State 102–71. Due to changes in seating configuration however, this record is no longer attainable.

=== Other events ===
Former President Bill Clinton visited UC Davis to gain support for his wife Hillary Clinton's presidential nomination in 2008. Around 7,800 people were in attendance with a reported 3,500 more turned away at the door.

World Wrestling Entertainment have also held shows at The Pavilion.

== See also ==
- List of NCAA Division I basketball arenas
