= 2023–24 Colorado Buffaloes women's basketball team =

American college basketball season

2023–24 Colorado Buffaloes women's basketball

NCAA tournament, Sweet Sixteen
- Conference: Pac-12 Conference

Ranking
- Coaches: No. 16
- AP: No. 15
- Record: 24–10 (11–7 Pac-12)
- Head coach: JR Payne (8th season)
- Assistant coaches: Toriano Towns; Alex Earl; Taelor Karr; Matt Hower; Shelley Sheetz
- Home arena: CU Events Center

2023–24 Pac-12 Conference women's basketball standings
	Conf.				Overall
Team	W		L	PCT	W		L	PCT
No. 9 Stanford	15	–	3	.833	30	–	6	.833
No. 5 USC †	13	–	5	.722	29	–	6	.829
No. 10 UCLA	13	–	5	.722	27	–	7	.794
No. 8 Oregon State	12	–	6	.667	27	–	8	.771
No. 15 Colorado	11	–	7	.611	24	–	10	.706
No. 22 Utah	11	–	7	.611	23	–	11	.676
Arizona	8	–	10	.444	18	–	16	.529
California	7	–	11	.389	19	–	15	.559
Washington State	7	–	11	.389	21	–	15	.583
Washington	6	–	12	.333	16	–	15	.516
Arizona State	3	–	15	.167	11	–	20	.355
Oregon	2	–	16	.111	11	–	21	.344
† 2024 Pac-12 tournament winner Rankings from AP Poll

The 2023–24 Colorado Buffaloes women's basketball team represented the University of Colorado Boulder during the 2023–24 NCAA Division I women's basketball season. The Buffaloes were led by eighth year head coach JR Payne and played their home games at the CU Events Center in their last season as members of the Pac-12 Conference before they will rejoin the Big 12 Conference in the 2024–25 season.

== Previous season ==
The Buffaloes finished the season 25–9, 13–5 in Pac-12 play to finish in third place. They defeated Oregon State in the quarterfinals of the Pac-12 women's tournament before losing in the semifinals to Washington State. They received an at-large bid to the NCAA Women's Tournament where they defeated Middle Tennessee in the First Round and Duke in the Second Round before losing to Iowa in the Sweet Sixteen. This was the Buffaloes' first advancement to the Sweet Sixteen since 2003.

== Offseason ==
=== Departures ===
Colorado Departures
Name	Num	Pos.	Height	Year	Hometown	Reason for Departure
Tayanna Jones	1	G	5'7"	Senior	Birmingham, AL	Graduated.
Ally Fitzgerald	5	F	6'2"	Freshman	Ballwin, MO	Transferred to UC Davis.
Lizzie Holder	10	G	6'1"	Freshman	Stillwater, MN	Transferred to Navy.
Jada Wynn	23	G	6'1"	Freshman	Yorba Linda, CA	Transferred to Texas Tech.

=== Incoming ===
Colorado incoming transfers
Name	Num	Pos.	Height	Year	Hometown	Previous School
Sara-Rose Smith	4	G	6'1	Senior	Victoria, Australia	Missouri
Shelomi Sanders	22	G	5'6	(redshirt) Freshman	Rockwall, TX	Jackson State
Maddie Nolan	24	G	5'11	GS Senior	Zionsville, IN	Michigan

==== Recruiting ====
College recruiting information
Name	Hometown	School	Height	Weight	Commit date
Kennedy Sanders; PG	Chaska, MN	Chaska High School	5 ft 8 in (1.73 m)	N/A	
Kennedy Sanders; PG	Recruit ratings: ESPN: (93)				
Ruthie Loomis-Goltl; F	Bridgeport, NE	Bridgeport High School	6 ft 3 in (1.91 m)	N/A	
Ruthie Loomis-Goltl; F	Recruit ratings: ESPN: (93)				
Overall recruit ranking:
Note: In many cases, Scout, Rivals, 247Sports, On3, and ESPN may conflict in their listings of height and weight.; In these cases, the average was taken. ESPN grades are on a 100-point scale.; Sources: "2023 Player Commits". ESPN. Archived from the original on January 20, 2023.

== Roster ==
2023–24 Colorado Buffaloes women's basketball team
Players
Coaches

Pos.	#	Name	Height	Year	Previous school	Hometown
G	0	Jaylyn Sherrod	5 ft 7 in (1.7 m)	GS	Rasmay HS	Birmingham, AL
G	1	Jadyn Atchison	6 ft 1 in (1.85 m)	Fr	Cedar Hill HS	Cedar Hill, TX
G	2	Tameiya Sadler	5 ft 8 in (1.73 m)	Sr	St. Patrick-St. Vincent HS; Washington	Vallejo, CA
G	3	Frida Formann	5 ft 11 in (1.8 m)	Sr	Falkonergårdens Gymnasium	Bagsværd, Denmark
G	4	Sara-Rose Smith	6 ft 1 in (1.85 m)	Sr	BA Centre of Excellence; Missouri	Victoria, Australia
G	5	Kennedy Sanders	5 ft 8 in (1.73 m)	Fr	Chaska HS	Chaska, MN
F	11	Quay Miller	6 ft 3 in (1.91 m)	GS	Kentridge HS; Washington	Renton, WA
G	13	Lele Tanuvasa	6 ft 0 in (1.83 m)	Fr	St. Mary's HS	Eureka, CA
G	15	Kindyll Wetta	5 ft 9 in (1.75 m)	Jr	Valor Christian HS	Castle Rock, CO
C	21	Aaronette Vonleh	6 ft 3 in (1.91 m)	Jr	West Linn HS; Arizona	West Linn, OR
G	22	Shelomi Sanders (W)	5 ft 6 in (1.68 m)	RS Fr	Rockwall-Heath HS; Jackson State	Rockwall, TX
G	23	Mikayla Johnson	6 ft 1 in (1.85 m)	RS Fr	Bartlett HS	Anchorage, AK
G	24	Maddie Nolan	5 ft 11 in (1.8 m)	GS	Zionsville Community HS; Michigan	Zionsville, IN
F	25	Brianna McLeod	6 ft 3 in (1.91 m)	So	Kings Christian	Brampton, ON
G	31	Sophie Gerber	6 ft 0 in (1.83 m)	Jr	Desert Mountain	Scottsdale, AZ
F	32	Ruthie Loomis-Goltl	6 ft 3 in (1.91 m)	Fr	Bridgeport HS	Bridgeport, NE
F	45	Charlotte Whittaker	6 ft 3 in (1.91 m)	GS	St Andrew's College	Cust, New Zealand

Head coach

- JR Payne (Saint Mary's)

Assistant coach(es)

- Toriano Towns (Saint Mary's)
- Alex Earl (Arizona State)
- Taelor Karr (Gonzaga)
- Matt Hower (Colorado State)
- Shelley Sheetz (Colorado)

Legend

- (C) Team captain
- (S) Suspended
- (I) Ineligible
- (W) Walk-on
- Injured
- Current redshirt

Roster

== Schedule ==
Date time, TV	Rank^{#}	Opponent^{#}	Result	Record	High points	High rebounds	High assists	Site (attendance) city, state
Exhibition
October 28, 2023*; 1:00 p.m.	No. 20	Adams State	W 81–57		16 – Formann	8 – Smith	3 – Sherrod	CU Events Center (586); Boulder, CO
Non-conference regular season
November 6, 2023*; 5:30 p.m., TNT	No. 20	vs. No. 1 LSU; Naismith Hall of Fame Series	W 92–78	1–0	27 – Formann	8 – Sherrod	6 – Sherrod	T-Mobile Arena (7,595); Paradise, NV
November 8, 2023*; 6:00 p.m.	No. 20	Le Moyne	W 97–38	2–0	15 – Formann	11 – Vonleh	8 – Sherrod	CU Events Center (1,893); Boulder, CO
November 12, 2023*; 4:00 p.m., P12N	No. 20	Oklahoma State	W 86–75	3–0	18 – Vonleh	10 – Miller	9 – Sherrod	CU Events Center (3,931); Boulder, CO
November 18, 2023*; 7:00 p.m., ESPN+	No. 5	at SMU	W 84–69	4–0	23 – Vonleh	10 – Miller	5 – Wetta	Moody Coliseum (1,749); Dallas, TX
November 23, 2023*; 11:00 a.m., ESPN3	No. 3	vs. Cincinnati; Paradise Jam Island Division	W 77–60	5–0	15 – Sadler	8 – Morris	5 – Sherrod	UVI Sports & Fitness Center (624); Saint Thomas, USVI
November 24, 2023*; 11:00 a.m., ESPN3	No. 3	vs. Kentucky; Paradise Jam Island Division	W 96–53	6–0	19 – Vonleh	7 – Smith	5 – Formann	UVI Sports & Fitness Center (524); Saint Thomas, USVI
November 25, 2023*; 11:00 a.m., ESPN3	No. 3	vs. No. 10 NC State; Paradise Jam Island Division	L 60–78	6–1	20 – Sherrod	5 – Vonleh	4 – Sherrod	UVI Sports & Fitness Center (924); Saint Thomas, USVI
November 28, 2023*; 6:00 p.m.	No. 7т	Boston University	W 85–55	7–1	22 – Formann	9 – Miller	4 – Sherrod	CU Events Center (2,743); Boulder, CO
December 2, 2023*; 1:00 p.m., MW Network	No. 7т	at Air Force	W 74–58	8–1	23 – Formann	9 – Miller	6 – Sherrod	Clune Arena (2,177); Colorado Springs, CO
December 5, 2023*; 11:00 a.m.	No. 8	UT Arlington	W 95–74	9–1	23 – Formann	11 – Miller	13 – Sherrod	CU Events Center (2,673); Boulder, CO
December 21, 2023*; 12:00 p.m., P12N	No. 8	Northern Colorado	W 78–56	10–1	16 – Sherrod	6 – Miller	6 – Wetta	CU Events Center (2,654); Boulder, CO
Pac-12 regular season
December 30, 2023; 1:00 p.m., P12N	No. 8	No. 12 Utah	W 76–65	11–1 (1–0)	34 – Sherrod	12 – Smith	4 – Sherrod	CU Events Center (7,383); Boulder, CO
January 5, 2024; 6:00 p.m., P12N	No. 5	at Arizona	W 75–74	12–1 (2–0)	18 – Sherrod	9 – Miller	6 – Wetta	McKale Center (7,386); Tucson, AZ
January 7, 2024; 12:00 p.m., P12N	No. 5	at Arizona State	W 81–68	13–1 (3–0)	20 – Vonleh	10 – Miller	6 – Sherrod	Desert Financial Arena (1,362); Tempe, AZ
January 12, 2024; 7:00 p.m., P12N	No. 5	California	W 76–61	14–1 (4–0)	19 – Vonleh	12 – Miller	5 – Sherrod	CU Events Center (3,540); Boulder, CO
January 14, 2024; 12:00 p.m., P12N	No. 5	No. 8 Stanford	W 71–59	15–1 (5–0)	13 – Sherrod	10 – Miller	5 – Wetta	CU Events Center (9,111); Boulder, CO
January 19, 2024; 6:00 p.m., P12N	No. 3	No. 5 UCLA	L 68–76	15–2 (5–1)	17 – Sherrod	7 – Vonleh	5 – Wetta	CU Events Center (11,338); Boulder, CO
January 21, 2024; 1:00 p.m., P12N	No. 3	No. 6 USC	W 63–59	16–2 (6–1)	19 – Miller	12 – Miller	6 – Wetta	CU Events Center (8,474); Boulder, CO
January 26, 2024; 8:00 p.m., P12N	No. 3	at No. 25 Oregon State	L 62–68	16–3 (6–2)	19 – Sherrod	8 – Miller	2 – Sherrod	Gill Coliseum (5,262); Corvallis, OR
January 28, 2024; 1:00 p.m., P12N	No. 3	at Oregon	W 61–48	17–3 (7–2)	16 – Vonleh	10 – Vonleh	7 – Wetta	Matthew Knight Arena (2,517); Eugene, OR
February 2, 2024; 8:00 p.m., P12N	No. 6	at Washington State	W 63–57	18–3 (8–2)	27 – Formann	15 – Miller	3 – Sherrod	Beasley Coliseum (1,154); Pullman, WA
February 4, 2024; 1:00 p.m., P12N	No. 4	at Washington	W 80–57	19–3 (9–2)	21 – Vonleh	10 – Miller	9 – Formann	Alaska Airlines Arena (4,900); Seattle, WA
February 9, 2024; 7:00 p.m., P12N	No. 4	Oregon	W 90–56	20–3 (10–2)	19 – Nolan	11 – Miller	7 – Wetta	CU Events Center (5,447); Boulder, CO
February 11, 2024; 12:00 p.m., P12N	No. 4	No. 17 Oregon State	L 59–65	20–4 (10–3)	14 – Sherrod	8 – Vonleh	4 – Sadler	CU Events Center (6,740); Boulder, CO
February 16, 2024; 6:00 p.m., P12N	No. 8	at No. 22 Utah	L 76–77	20–5 (10–4)	15 – Sherrod	6 – Miller	9 – Sherrod	Jon M. Huntsman Center (5,999); Salt Lake City, UT
February 23, 2024; 8:00 p.m., P12N	No. 11	at No. 7 USC	L 81–87	20–6 (10–5)	18 – Vonleh	4 – Wetta	6 – Sherrod	Galen Center (5,762); Los Angeles, CA
February 26, 2024; 7:00 p.m., ESPN2	No. 13	at No. 8 UCLA	L 45–53	20–7 (10–6)	10 – Sherrod	7 – Sherrod	5 – Wetta	Pauley Pavilion (5,319); Los Angeles, CA
February 29, 2024; 7:00 p.m., P12N	No. 13	Washington	W 68–62	21–7 (11–6)	20 – Nolan	7 – Vonleh	5 – Wetta	CU Events Center (4,203); Boulder, CO
March 2, 2024; 1:00 p.m., P12N	No. 13	Washington State; Senior Day	L 63–72	21–8 (11–7)	18 – Sherrod	10 – Miller	6 – Sherrod	CU Events Center (7,491); Boulder, CO
Pac-12 Women's Tournament
March 6, 2024; 1:00 p.m., P12N	(5) No. 18	vs. (12) Oregon; First Round	W 79–30	22–8	17 – Formann	6 – Vonleh	8 – Sherrod	MGM Grand Garden Arena (3,894); Paradise, NV
March 7, 2024; 1:00 p.m., P12N	(5) No. 18	vs. (4) No. 13 Oregon State; Quarterfinals	L 79–85 ^{2OT}	22–9	17 – Sherrod	8 – Miller	7 – Sherrod	MGM Grand Garden Arena (4,883); Paradise, NV
NCAA tournament
March 22, 2024*; 5:00 p.m., ESPNews	(5 A2) No. 17	vs. (12 A2) Drake; First Round	W 86–72	23–9	18 – Vonleh	10 – Vonleh	8 – Sherrod	Bramlage Coliseum (9,642); Manhattan, KS
March 24, 2024*; 12:00 p.m., ESPN	(5 A2) No. 17	at (4 A2) No. 15 Kansas State; Second Round	W 63–50	24–9	11 – Nolan	10 – Miller	4 – Wetta	Bramlage Coliseum (10,692); Manhattan, KS
March 30, 2024*; 1:30 p.m., ABC	(5 A2) No. 17	vs. (1 A2) No. 2 Iowa; Sweet Sixteen	L 68–89	24–10	13 – Vonleh	5 – Vonleh	10 – Sherrod	MVP Arena (13,878); Albany, NY
*Non-conference game. ^{#}Rankings from AP Poll. (#) Tournament seedings in parentheses. A2=Albany Regional 2. All times are in Mountain Time.

== Game summaries ==
=== Adams State Grizzlies (exhibition) ===
October 28, 2023
1:00 p.m. MDT

Adams State Grizzlies 57, No. 20 Colorado Buffaloes 81
Scoring by quarter: 18–18, 9–20, 18–24, 12–19
Pts: Harmanie Dominguez, 17; Rebs: Tied, 4 Asts: Angelline Nageak, 4	Pts: Frida Formann, 16; Rebs: Sara-Rose Smith, 8 Asts: Jaylyn Sherrod, 3

CU Events Center • Boulder, Colorado
Attendance: 586
Referees: Esther Hsu, Darren Krezsnik, Michael Price

=== vs No. 1 LSU ===
TNT

November 6, 2023
5:30 p.m. MST

No. 1 LSU Tigers 78, No. 20 Colorado Buffaloes 92
Scoring by quarter: 16–14, 16–24, 19–25, 27–29
Pts: Mikaylah Williams, 17; Rebs: Angel Reese, 12; Asts: Hailey Van Lith, 7	Pts: Frida Formann, 27; Rebs: Jaylyn Sherrod, 8 Asts: Jaylyn Sherrod, 6

T-Mobile Arena • Paradise, Nevada
Attendance: 7,595
Referees: Brenda Pantoja, Saif Esho, Tim Resch

=== Le Moyne ===
live stream

November 8, 2023
6:00 p.m. MST

Le Moyne Dolphins 38, No. 20 Colorado Buffaloes 97
Scoring by quarter: 6–26, 15–26, 9–27, 8–18
Pts: Lytoya Baker, 18; Rebs: Emily Florvil, 7 Asts: Sydney Lusher, 2	Pts: Frida Formann, 15; Rebs: Aaronette Vonleh, 11; Asts: Jaylyn Sherrod, 8

CU Events Center • Boulder, Colorado
Attendance: 1,893
Referees: Nicole Leon, Julie Krommenhoek, Chuck Gonzalez

=== Oklahoma State ===
P12N

November 12, 2023
4:00 p.m. MST

Oklahoma State Cowgirls 75, No. 20 Colorado Buffaloes 86
Scoring by quarter: 16–24, 23–11, 20–21, 16–30
Pts: Anna Gret Asi, 25; Rebs: Anna Gret Asi, 3 Asts: Kennedy Fauntleroy, 4	Pts: Aaronette Vonleh, 18; Rebs: Quay Miller, 10; Asts: Jaylyn Sherrod, 9

CU Events Center • Boulder, Colorado
Attendance: 3,931
Referees: Michol Murray, In'Fini Robinson, Sean Martin

=== at SMU Mustangs ===
ESPN+

November 18, 2023
7:00 p.m. MST

No. 5 Colorado Buffaloes 84, SMU Mustangs 69
Scoring by quarter: 18–13, 26–23, 20–16, 20–17
Pts: Aaronette Vonleh, 23; Rebs: Quay Miller, 10; Asts: Kindyll Wetta, 3	Pts: Tiara Young, 30; Rebs: Chantae Embry, 8 Asts: Chantae Embry, 4

Moody Coliseum • Dallas, Texas
Attendance: 1,749
Referees: Maj Forsberg, Mark Resch, Trevor Inouye

=== vs Cincinnati (Paradise Jam Quarterfinals) ===
ESPN3

November 23, 2023
11:00 a.m. MST

Cincinnati Bearcats 60, No. 3 Colorado Buffaloes 77
Scoring by quarter: 12–21, 16–20, 11–23, 21–13
Pts: Jillian Hayes, 17; Rebs: Destiny Thomas, 7 Asts: A'riel Jackson, 4	Pts: Tameiya Sadler, 15; Rebs: Quay Miller, 8 Asts: Jaylyn Sherrod, 5

Sports and Fitness Center • Saint Thomas, U.S. Virgin Islands
Attendance: 624
Referees: Angelese Carr, Brandon Enterline, Cori Chambers

=== vs Kentucky (Paradise Jam) ===
ESPN3

November 24, 2023
11:00 a.m. MST

Kentucky Wildcats 53, No. 3 Colorado Buffaloes 96
Scoring by quarter: 14–25, 20–20, 14–28, 5–23
Pts: Eniya Russell, 14; Rebs: Ajae Petty, 7 Asts: Maddie Scherr, 3	Pts: Aaronette Vonleh, 19; Rebs: Sara-Rose Smith, 7 Asts: Frida Formann, 5

Sports and Fitness Center • Saint Thomas, U.S. Virgin Islands
Attendance: 524
Referees: Tim Resch, Asheley Birch, Ryan Durham

=== vs No. 10 NC State (Paradise Jam) ===
ESPN3

November 25, 2023
11:00 a.m. MST

No. 10 NC State Wolfpack 78, No. 3 Colorado Buffaloes 60
Scoring by quarter: 22–6, 19–20, 22–14, 15–20
Pts: River Baldwin, 24; Rebs: River Baldwin, 8 Asts: Saniya Rivers, 7	Pts: Jaylyn Sherrod, 20; Rebs: Aaronette Vonleh, 5 Asts: Jaylyn Sherrod, 4

Sports and Fitness Center • Saint Thomas, U.S. Virgin Islands
Referees: Brandon Enterline, John Capolino, Cori Chambers

=== Boston University ===
live stream

November 28, 2023
6:00 p.m. MST

Boston University Terriers 55, No. 7 Colorado Buffaloes 85
Scoring by quarter: 16–16, 11–19, 24–20, 4–30
Pts: Alex Giannaros, 16; Rebs: Caitlin Weimar, 12; Asts: Alex Giannaros, 3	Pts: Frida Formann, 22; Rebs: Quay Miller, 9 Asts: Jaylyn Sherrod, 4

CU Events Center • Boulder, Colorado
Attendance: 2,743
Referees: Marc Merritt, Brian Woods, Tiffany Bird

=== at Air Force ===
MW Network

December 2, 2023
1:00 p.m. MST

No. 7 Colorado Buffaloes 74, Air Force Falcons 58
Scoring by quarter: 13–19, 8–21, 15–16, 22–18
Pts: Taylor Britt, 13; Rebs: Taylor Britt, 7 Asts: Madison Smith, 3	Pts: Frida Formann, 23; Rebs: Quay Miller, 9 Asts: Jaylyn Sherrod, 6

Clune Arena • Colorado Springs, CO
Attendance: 2,177
Referees: S. Brian Hall, Roy Goulbeyan, Felicity Willis

=== UT Arlington ===
live stream

December 5, 2023
11:00 a.m. MST

UT Arlington Mavericks 74, No. 8 Colorado Buffaloes 95
Scoring by quarter: 23–29, 13–22, 19–26, 19–18
Pts: Keiori Lee, 18; Rebs: Avery Brittingham, 6 Asts: Nya Threatt, 3	Pts: Frida Formann, 23; Rebs: Quay Miller, 11; Asts: Jaylyn Sherrod, 13

CU Events Center • Boulder, Colorado
Attendance: 2,673
Referees: Brenda Pantoja, Karen Lasuik, Kaili Kimura

=== Northern Colorado ===
P12N

December 21, 2023
12:00 p.m. MST

Northern Colorado Bears 56, No. 8 Colorado Buffaloes 78
Scoring by quarter: 21–15, 14–26, 8–19, 13–18
Pts: Delaynie Byrne, 21; Rebs: Delaynie Byrne, 9 Asts: Gabi Fields, 5	Pts: Jaylyn Sherrod, 16; Rebs: Quay Miller, 6 Asts: Kindyll Wetta, 6

CU Events Center • Boulder, Colorado
Attendance: 2,654
Referees: Melissa Barlow, Tyler Trimble, Kelly Broomfield

=== No. 12 Utah ===
P12N

December 30, 2023
1:00 p.m. MST

No. 12 Utah Utes 65, No. 8 Colorado Buffaloes 76
Scoring by quarter: 15–16, 18–17, 21–18, 11–25
Pts: Alissa Pili, 27; Rebs: Alissa Pili, 10; Asts: Alissa Pili, 5	Pts: Jaylyn Sherrod, 34; Rebs: Sara-Rose Smith, 12; Asts: Jaylyn Sherrod, 4

CU Events Center • Boulder, Colorado
Attendance: 7,383
Referees: Lisa Jones, Tiffany Bird, Darren Krzesnik

=== at Arizona ===
P12N

January 5, 2024
6:00 p.m. MST

No. 5 Colorado Buffaloes 75, Arizona Wildcats 74
Scoring by quarter: 19–16, 19–20, 14–22, 23–16
Pts: Jaylyn Sherrod, 18; Rebs: Quay Miller, 9 Asts: Kindyll Wetta, 6	Pts: Kailyn Gilbert, 19; Rebs: Helena Pueyo, 6 Asts: Jada Williams, 5

McKale Center • Tucson, AZ
Attendance: 7,386
Referees: Michol Murray, Anita Ortega, Sean Martin

=== at Arizona State ===
P12N

January 7, 2024
12:00 p.m. MST

No. 5 Colorado Buffaloes 81, Arizona State Sun Devils 68
Scoring by quarter: 25–18, 25–7, 21–24, 10–19
Pts: Aaronette Vonleh, 20; Rebs: Quay Miller, 10; Asts: Jaylyn Sherrod, 6	Pts: Jalyn Brown, 35; Rebs: Jalyn Brown, 5 Asts: Jaddan Simmons, 5

Desert Financial Arena • Tempe, AZ
Attendance: 1,362
Referees: Charles Gonzalez, Teresa Turner, Demoya Pugh

=== California ===
P12N

January 12, 2024
7:00 p.m. MST

California Golden Bears 61, No. 5 Colorado Buffaloes 76
Scoring by quarter: 9–15, 17–19, 19–23, 16–19
Pts: Marta Suárez, 14; Rebs: Marta Suárez, 9 Asts: Ioanna Krimili, 3	Pts: Aaronette Vonleh, 19; Rebs: Quay Miller, 12; Asts: Jaylyn Sherrod, 5

CU Events Center • Boulder, Colorado
Attendance: 3,540
Referees: Tiffany Bird, Brian Woods, Nicole Leon

=== No. 8 Stanford ===
P12N

January 14, 2024
12:00 p.m. MST

No. 8 Stanford Cardinal 59, No. 5 Colorado Buffaloes 71
Scoring by quarter: 17–18, 13–18, 11–22, 18–13
Pts: Kiki Iriafen, 19; Rebs: Kiki Iriafen, 17; Asts: Talana Lepolo, 5	Pts: Jaylyn Sherrod, 13; Rebs: Quay Miller, 10; Asts: Kindyll Wetta, 5

CU Events Center • Boulder, Colorado
Attendance: 9,111
Referees: Brenda Pantoja, Kyle Bacon, Kimberly Hobbs

=== No. 5 UCLA ===
P12N

January 14, 2024
6:00 p.m. MST

No. 5 UCLA Bruins 76, No. 3 Colorado Buffaloes 68
Scoring by quarter: 15–19, 17–16, 17–13, 27–20
Pts: Charisma Osborne, 22; Rebs: Angela Dugalić, 13; Asts: Kiki Rice, 2	Pts: Jaylyn Sherrod, 17; Rebs: Aaronette Vonleh, 7 Asts: Kindyll Wetta, 5

CU Events Center • Boulder, Colorado
Attendance: 11,338
Referees: Marc Merritt, Tyler Trimble, Melissa Barlow

=== No. 6 USC ===
P12N

January 21, 2024
1:00 p.m. MST

No. 5 USC Trojans 59, No. 3 Colorado Buffaloes 63
Scoring by quarter: 18–14, 12–18, 17–17, 12–14
Pts: JuJu Watkins, 20; Rebs: Rayah Marshall, 6 Asts: McKenzie Forbes, 3	Pts: Quay Miller, 19; Rebs: Quay Miller, 12; Asts: Kindyll Wetta, 6

CU Events Center • Boulder, Colorado
Attendance: 8,474
Referees: Michol Murray, Charles Gonzalez, Ashely Ellis

=== at No. 25 Oregon State ===
P12N

January 26, 2024
8:00 p.m. MST

No. 3 Colorado Buffaloes 62, No. 25 Oregon State Beavers 68
Scoring by quarter: 20–14, 10–18, 10–14, 22–22
Pts: Jaylyn Sherrod, 19; Rebs: Quay Miller, 8 Asts: Jaylyn Sherrod, 2	Pts: Donovyn Hunter, 16; Rebs: Raegan Beers, 9 Asts: Donovyn Hunter, 4

Gill Coliseum • Corvallis, OR
Attendance: 5,262
Referees: Michael Price, Benny Luna, Felecity Willis

=== at Oregon ===
P12N

January 28, 2024
1:00 p.m. MST

No. 3 Colorado Buffaloes 61, Oregon Ducks 48
Scoring by quarter: 13–8, 18–3, 14–17, 16–20
Pts: Aaronette Vonleh, 16; Rebs: Aaronette Vonleh, 10; Asts: Kindyll Wetta, 7	Pts: Grace VanSlooten, 16; Rebs: Phillipina Kyei, 17; Asts: Grace VanSlooten, 2

Matthew Knight Arena • Eugene, OR
Attendance: 2,517
Referees: Stacie Blow, Kyle Bacon, Lisa Jones

=== at Washington State ===
P12N

February 2, 2024
8:00 p.m. MST

No. 6 Colorado Buffaloes 63, Washington State Cougars 57
Scoring by quarter: 15–15, 10–13, 20–14, 18–15
Pts: Frida Formann, 27; Rebs: Quay Miller, 15; Asts: Jaylyn Sherrod, 3	Pts: Tara Wallack, 19; Rebs: Bella Murekatete, 10; Asts: Bella Murekatete, 3

Beasley Coliseum • Pullman, WA
Attendance: 1,154
Referees: Kelly Broomfield, In'Fini Robinson, Charles Gonzalez

=== at Washington ===
P12N

February 4, 2024
1:00 p.m. MST

No. 6 Colorado Buffaloes 80, Washington Huskies 57
Scoring by quarter: 24–15, 26–13, 20–13, 10–16
Pts: Aaronette Vonleh, 21; Rebs: Quay Miller, 10; Asts: Frida Formann, 9	Pts: Dalayah Daniels, 14; Rebs: Dalayah Daniels, 5 Asts: Hannah Stines, 2

Alaska Airlines Arena • Seattle, WA
Attendance: 4,900
Referees: Darren Krzesnik, Tyler Trimble, Marc Merrit

=== Oregon ===
P12N

February 9, 2024
7:00 p.m. MST

Oregon Ducks 56, No. 4 Colorado Buffaloes 90
Scoring by quarter: 16–22, 15–27, 14–29, 12–12
Pts: Grace VanSlooten, 16; Rebs: Phillipina Kyei, 8 Asts: Grace VanSlooten, 3	Pts: Maddie Nolan, 19; Rebs: Quay Miller, 11; Asts: Kindyll Wetta, 7

CU Events Center • Boulder, Colorado
Attendance: 5,447
Referees: Brenda Pantoja, Tiffany Bird, Richard Waters

=== No. 17 Oregon State ===
P12N

February 11, 2024
12:00 p.m. MST

No. 17 Oregon State Beavers 65, No. 4 Colorado Buffaloes 59
Scoring by quarter: 17–8, 27–16, 16–14, 5–21
Pts: Talia von Oelhoffen, 18; Rebs: Raegan Beers, 12; Asts: Donovyn Hunter, 4	Pts: Jaylyn Sherrod, 14; Rebs: Aaronette Vonleh, 9 Asts: Tameiya Sadler, 4

CU Events Center • Boulder, Colorado
Attendance: 6,740
Referees: Corey Long, Teresa Turner, Michol Murray

=== at No. 22 Utah ===
P12N

February 16, 2024
6:00 p.m. MST

No. 8 Colorado Buffaloes 76, No. 22 Utah Utess 77
Scoring by quarter: 14–23, 10–16, 26–23, 26–15
Pts: Jaylyn Sherrod, 15; Rebs: Quay Miller, 15; Asts: Jaylyn Sherrod, 9	Pts: Alissa Pili, 18; Rebs: Inês Vieira, 8 Asts: Inês Vieira, 7

Jon M. Huntsman Center • Salt Lake City, UT
Attendance: 5,999

=== at No. 7 USC ===
P12N

February 23, 2024
8:00 p.m. MST

No. 11 Colorado Buffaloes 81, No. 7 USC Trojans 87
Scoring by quarter: 19–22, 24–25, 18–20, 20–20
Pts: Aaronette Vonleh, 18; Rebs: Kindyll Wetta, 4 Asts: Jaylyn Sherrod, 6	Pts: Juju Watkins, 42; Rebs: Kaitlyn Davis, 5 Asts: McKenzie Forbes, 7

Galen Center • Los Angeles, CA
Attendance: 5,762
Referees: Lisa Jones, Benny Luna, Felicity Willis

=== at No. 8 UCLA ===
ESPN2

February 26, 2024
7:00 p.m. MST

No. 13 Colorado Buffaloes 45, No. 8 UCLA Bruins 53
Scoring by quarter: 7–17, 12–12, 16–11, 10–13
Pts: Jaylyn Sherrod, 10; Rebs: Jaylyn Sherrod, 7 Asts: Kindyll Wetta, 5	Pts: Kiki Rice, 20; Rebs: Kiki Rice, 10; Asts: Kiki Rice, 4

Pauley Pavilion • Los Angeles, CA
Attendance: 5,319
Referees: Brenda Pantoja, Kyle Bacon, Richard Waters

=== Washington ===
P12N

February 29, 2024
7:00 p.m. MST

Washington Huskies 62, No. 13 Colorado Buffaloes 68
Scoring by quarter: 12–18, 16–21, 19–20, 15–9
Pts: Lauren Schwartz, 18; Rebs: Dalayah Daniels, 8 Asts: Sayvia Sellers, 2	Pts: Maddie Nolan, 20; Rebs: Aaronette Vonleh, 7 Asts: Kindyll Wetta, 5

CU Events Center • Boulder, Colorado
Attendance: 4,203
Referees: Marc Merritt, InFini Robinson, Michol Murray

=== Washington State ===
P12N

March 2, 2024
1:00 p.m. MST

Washington State Cougars 72, No. 13 Colorado Buffaloes 63
Scoring by quarter: 16–15, 10–16, 21–19, 25–13
Pts: Eleonora Villa, 20; Rebs: Beyonce Bea, 7 Asts: Tara Wallack, 5	Pts: Jaylyn Sherrod, 18; Rebs: Quay Miller, 10; Asts: Jaylyn Sherrod, 6

CU Events Center • Boulder, Colorado
Attendance: 7,491
Referees: Robert Scofield, Tiffany Bird, Kenneth Nash

=== vs Oregon (Pac-12 First Round) ===
P12N

March 6, 2024
1:00 p.m. MST

Oregon Ducks 30, No. 18 Colorado Buffaloes 79
Scoring by quarter: 7–26, 4–12, 8–15, 11–26
Pts: Grace VanSlooten, 9 Rebs: Kennedy Basham, 6 Asts: Phillipina Kyei, 2	Pts: Frida Formann, 17; Rebs: Aaronette Vonleh, 6 Asts: Jaylyn Sherrod, 8

MGM Grand Garden Arena • Paradise, NV
Attendance: 3,894
Referees: Lisa Jones, Chuck Gonzalez, Tiffany Bird

=== vs No. 13 Oregon State (Pac-12 Quarterfinal) ===
P12N

March 7, 2024
1:00 p.m. MST

No. 13 Oregon State Beavers 85, No. 18 Colorado Buffaloes 79 (2OT)
Scoring by quarter: 10–17, 12–8, 14–20, 17–8, Overtime: 10–10, 16–22
Pts: Raegan Beers, 27; Rebs: Raegan Beers, 13; Asts: Donovyn Hunter, 9	Pts: Jaylyn Sherrod, 23; Rebs: Quay Miller, 8 Asts: Jaylyn Sherrod, 7

MGM Grand Garden Arena • Paradise, NV
Attendance: 4,883
Referees: Brenda Pantoja, Michael Price, Alecia Murray

=== vs Drake (First Round) ===
ESPNews

March 22, 2024
5:00 p.m. MDT

Drake Bulldogs 72, No. 17 Colorado Buffaloes 86
Scoring by quarter: 21–24, 20–22, 12–25, 19–15
Pts: Katie Dinnebier, 24; Rebs: Taylor McAulay, 4 Asts: Katie Dinnebier, 7	Pts: Aaronette Vonleh, 18; Rebs: Aaronette Vonleh, 10; Asts: Jaylyn Sherrod, 8

Bramlage Coliseum • Manhattan, KS
Attendance: 9,642
Referees: Tiffany Bird, Brian Gatland, Zac Brost

=== at No. 15 Kansas State (Second Round) ===
ESPN

March 24, 2024
12:00 p.m. MDT

No. 17 Colorado Buffaloes 63, No. 15 Kansas State Wildcats 50
Scoring by quarter: 14–14, 19–21, 19–7, 11–8
Pts: Maddie Nolan, 11; Rebs: Quay Miller, 10; Asts: Kindyll Wetta, 4	Pts: Gabby Gregory, 12; Rebs: Ayoka Lee, 11; Asts: Serena Sundell, 6

Bramlage Coliseum • Manhattan, KS
Attendance: 10,692
Referees: Tiffany Bird, Michael McConnell, Brian Garland

=== vs No. 2 Iowa (Regional Semifinals Sweet 16) ===
ABC

March 30, 2024
1:30 p.m. MDT

No. 2 Iowa Hawkeyes 89, No. 17 Colorado Buffaloes 68
Scoring by quarter: 22–14, 26–21, 20–12, 21–21
Pts: Caitlin Clark, 29; Rebs: Hannah Stuelke, 10; Asts: Caitlin Clark, 15	Pts: Aaronette Vonleh, 13; Rebs: Aaronette Vonleh, 5 Asts: Jaylyn Sherrod, 10

MVP Arena • Albany, NY
Attendance: 13,878
Referees: Dee Kantner, Timothy Daley, Kenneth Nash

== Rankings ==
Ranking movements Legend: ██ Increase in ranking ██ Decrease in ranking т = Tied with team above or below
	Week																				
Poll	Pre	1	2	3	4	5	6	7	8	9	10	11	12	13	14	15	16	17	18	19	Final
AP	20	5	3	7т	8	8	8	8	5	5	3	3	6	4	8	11	13	18	18	17	15
Coaches	18	7	4	7	8	8	8	8	7	5	3	3	6	4	8	11	15	19	17	17	16
