= 2023–24 Arizona Wildcats women's basketball team =

American college basketball season

2023–24 Arizona Wildcats women's basketball

NCAA tournament, First round
- Conference: Pac-12 Conference
- Record: 18–16 (8–10 Pac-12)
- Head coach: Adia Barnes (8th season)
- Assistant coaches: Salvo Coppa (8th season); Bett Shelby (1st season); Anthony Turner (1st season)
- Home arena: McKale Center

2023–24 Pac-12 Conference women's basketball standings
	Conf.				Overall
Team	W		L	PCT	W		L	PCT
No. 9 Stanford	15	–	3	.833	30	–	6	.833
No. 5 USC †	13	–	5	.722	29	–	6	.829
No. 10 UCLA	13	–	5	.722	27	–	7	.794
No. 8 Oregon State	12	–	6	.667	27	–	8	.771
No. 15 Colorado	11	–	7	.611	24	–	10	.706
No. 22 Utah	11	–	7	.611	23	–	11	.676
Arizona	8	–	10	.444	18	–	16	.529
California	7	–	11	.389	19	–	15	.559
Washington State	7	–	11	.389	21	–	15	.583
Washington	6	–	12	.333	16	–	15	.516
Arizona State	3	–	15	.167	11	–	20	.355
Oregon	2	–	16	.111	11	–	21	.344
† 2024 Pac-12 tournament winner Rankings from AP Poll

The 2023–24 Arizona Wildcats women's basketball team represented the University of Arizona during the 2023–24 NCAA Division I women's basketball season. The Wildcats were led by eighth-year head coach Adia Barnes. This was the Wildcats' 50th season at the on-campus McKale Center in Tucson, Arizona and 45th season as a member of the Pac-12 Conference.

This was also the last season that Arizona will play in the Pac-12 Conference before moving to the Big 12 Conference.

== Previous season ==
The Wildcats finished the 2022–23 season with a record of 22–10, 11–7 in Pac-12 play. The Wildcats were invited to the 2023 NCAA tournament where they defeated West Virginia in the first round before losing to Maryland in the second round.

== Offseason ==
=== Departures ===
Arizona Wildcats departures
Name	Number	Pos.	Height	Year	Hometown	Notes
Shaina Pellington	1	G	5'8"	Graduate Student	Pickerington, OH	Completed college eligibility
Cate Reese	25	F	6'2"	Graduate Student	Cypress, TX	Completed college eligibility
Jade Loville	30	G/F	5'11"	Graduate Student	Scottsdale, AZ	Completed college eligibility

==== Outgoing transfers ====
Arizona outgoing transfers
Name	Number	Pos.	Height	Year	Hometown	New School	Source
Madison Conner	4	G	5'11"	Sophomore	Chandler, AZ	Transferred to TCU	
Lemyah Hylton	10	G	5'11"	Freshman	London, OH	Transferred to Miami (FL)	
Paris Clark	22	G	5'8"	Freshman	Mount Vernon, NY	Transferred to Virginia	
Lauren Fields	23	G	5'9"	Senior	Shawnee, OK	Transferred to West Virginia	
Lauren Ware	32	F	6'5"	Junior	Bismarck, ND	Transferred to Texas A&M	

=== Acquisitions ===
==== Incoming transfers ====
Arizona incoming transfers
Name	Number	Pos.	Height	Year	Hometown	Previous School	Years Remaining	Date Eligible	Source
Courtney Blakley	1	G	5'8"	Junior	Gary, IN	Middle Tennessee	2		
Sali Kourouma	24	F	5'11'	(redshirt) Senior	Kati, Mali	Little Rock	1		
Isis Beh	33	F	6'3"	(redshirt) Junior	Murray, UT	West Virginia	2		

==== 2023 recruiting class ====
College recruiting
Name	Hometown	School	Height	Weight	Commit date
Montaya Dew; F	Las Vegas, NV	Centennial High School	5 ft 11 in (1.80 m)	N/A	Dec 23, 2021
Montaya Dew; F	Recruit ratings: ESPN: (97)				
Breya Cunningham; POST	Chula Vista, CA	La Jolla Country Day School	6 ft 4 in (1.93 m)	N/A	Jun 26, 2022
Breya Cunningham; POST	Recruit ratings: ESPN: (97)				
Jada Williams; PG	Kansas City, MO	La Jolla Country Day School (CA)	5 ft 6 in (1.68 m)	N/A	Aug 1, 2022
Jada Williams; PG	Recruit ratings: ESPN: (96)				
Skylar Jones; W	Chicago, IL	Whitney Young	6 ft 0 in (1.83 m)	N/A	Jun 5, 2023
Skylar Jones; W	Recruit ratings: ESPN: (91)				
Overall recruit ranking:
Note: In many cases, Scout, Rivals, 247Sports, On3, and ESPN may conflict in their listings of height and weight.; In these cases, the average was taken. ESPN grades are on a 100-point scale.; Sources: "2023 Player Commits". ESPN. Archived from the original on November 17, 2023.; "2023 Team Ranking". Rivals.

== Preseason ==
=== Preseason rankings ===
Pac-12 media poll (Coaches)
Predicted finish	Team	Votes (1st place)
1	Utah	116 (7)
2	UCLA	109 (3)
3	Stanford	100 (2)
4	Colorado	90
5	Washington State	84
6	USC	70
7	Arizona	51
8	Oregon	49
9	Washington	46
10	Oregon State	43
11	California	22
12	Arizona State	12

=== Preseason All-conference teams ===
Award	Player	Position	Year
Preseason All Pac-12 team	Esmery Martínez	F	GS

== Roster ==
2023–24 Arizona Wildcats women's basketball team
Players
Coaches

Pos.	#	Name	Height	Year	Previous school	Hometown
G	1	Courtney Blakely	5 ft 8 in (1.73 m)	Jr	Bishop Noll; Middle Tennessee	Gary, IN
G	2	Jada Williams	5 ft 8 in (1.73 m)	Fr	La Jolla Country Day	Kansas City, MO
F	3	Montaya Dew	6 ft 2 in (1.88 m)	Fr	Centennial	Las Vegas, NV
G	4	Skylar Jones	6 ft 0 in (1.83 m)	Fr	Whitney Young	Chicago, IL
F	12	Esmery Martínez	6 ft 2 in (1.88 m)	GS	Hamilton Heights Christian Academy; West Virginia	Hato Mayor del Rey, DR
G	13	Helena Pueyo	6 ft 0 in (1.83 m)	GS	Segle XXI	Palma de Mallorca, Spain
G	15	Kailyn Gilbert	5 ft 8 in (1.73 m)	So	Seffner Christian Academy	Tampa, FL
F	23	Maya Nnaji	6 ft 4 in (1.93 m)	So	Hopkins	St. Louis Park, MN
G/F	24	Salimatou Kourouma	5 ft 11 in (1.8 m)	RS Sr	Life Preparatory Academy; Little Rock	Kati, Mali
F	25	Breya Cunningham	6 ft 4 in (1.93 m)	Fr	La Jolla Country Day	Chula Vista, CA
F	33	Isis Beh	6 ft 3 in (1.91 m)	RS Jr	Murray; West Virginia	Murray, UT

Head coach

- Adia Barnes (Arizona)

Assistant coach(es)

- Salvo Coppa (IULM)
- Bett Shelby (Greensboro)
- Anthony Turner (Colorado)

Legend

- (C) Team captain
- (S) Suspended
- (I) Ineligible
- (W) Walk-on
- Injured
- Current redshirt

Roster

== Schedule and results ==
Date time, TV	Rank^{#}	Opponent^{#}	Result	Record	High points	High rebounds	High assists	Site (attendance) city, state
Exhibition
October 25, 2023*; 6:00 p.m.		West Texas A&M	W 103–58		24 – Gilbert	7 – Tied	7 – Pueyo	McKale Center (6,400); Tucson, AZ
November 1, 2023*; 6:00 p.m.		Point Loma	W 52–44		17 – Kourouma	6 – Nnaji	3 – Gilbert	McKale Center (6,335); Tucson, AZ
Regular season
November 6, 2023*; 6:00 p.m., ESPN+		at New Mexico State	W 68–57	1–0	16 – Gilbert	10 – Cunningham	4 – Williams	Pan American Center (1,297); Las Cruces, NM
November 10, 2023*; 6:30 p.m.		Northern Arizona	W 87–64	2–0	18 – Cunningham	10 – Gilbert	5 – Tied	McKale Center (6,909); Tucson, AZ
November 12, 2023*; 2:00 p.m.		Loyola Marymount	W 70–54	3–0	14 – Gilbert	9 – Gilbert	5 – Tied	McKale Center (6,784); Tucson, AZ
November 14, 2023*; 6:30 p.m.		San Diego	W 79–66	4–0	21 – Gilbert	9 – Pueyo	6 – Pueyo	McKale Center (6,727); Tucson, AZ
November 18, 2023*; 12:30 p.m., FloSports		vs. Memphis; Battle 4 Atlantis quarterfinals	W 90–57	5–0	19 – Martinez	11 – Martinez	5 – Pueyo	Imperial Arena (247); Nassau, Bahamas
November 19, 2023*; 10:00 a.m., FloSports		vs. No. 23 Ole Miss; Battle 4 Atlantis semifinals	L 47–56	5–1	12 – Nnaji	8 – Cunningham	3 – Tied	Imperial Arena (207); Nassau, Bahamas
November 20, 2023*; 12:30 p.m., ESPNU		vs. South Dakota; Battle 4 Atlantis 3rd place game	W 61–52	6–1	14 – Martinez	8 – Martinez	3 – Tied	Imperial Arena; Nassau, Bahamas
December 2, 2023*; 6:00 p.m., MW Network		at UNLV	L 53–72	6–2	21 – Gilbert	11 – Martinez	3 – Gibert	Thomas & Mack Center (3,953); Paradise, NV
December 7, 2023*; 6:30 p.m.		UC San Diego	W 81–38	7–2	15 – Williams	10 – Cunningham	4 – Cunningham	McKale Center (6,702); Tucson, AZ
December 13, 2023*; 7:00 p.m., P12N		No. 5 Texas	L 75–88	7–3	26 – Gilbert	5 – Tied	4 – Tied	McKale Center (7,261); Tucson, AZ
December 17, 2023; 5:00 p.m., P12N		at Arizona State	W 91–52	8–3 (1–0)	19 – Gilbert	8 – Cunningham	4 – Gilbert	Desert Financial Arena (3,907); Tempe, AZ
December 20, 2023*; 2:30 p.m., P12N		vs. No. 20 Gonzaga; Jerry Colangelo Classic	L 69–81	8–4	21 – Gilbert	7 – Pueyo	4 – Williams	Footprint Center; Phoenix, AZ
December 31, 2023*; 2:00 p.m.		Seattle	W 89–52	9–4	18 – Williams	10 – Gilbert	6 – Gilbert	McKale Center (7,500); Tucson, AZ
January 5, 2024; 6:00 p.m., P12N		No. 5 Colorado	L 74–75	9–5 (1–1)	19 – Gilbert	6 – Pueyo	5 – Williams	McKale Center (7,386); Tucson, AZ
January 7, 2024; 12:00 p.m., P12N		No. 15 Utah	W 71–70 ^{OT}	10–5 (2–1)	22 – Gilbert	12 – Gilbert	4 – Pueyo	McKale Center (7,385); Tucson, AZ
January 12, 2024; 8:00 p.m., P12N		at Oregon State	L 70–73 ^{2OT}	10–6 (2–2)	22 – Gilbert	8 – Martinez	3 – Tied	Gill Coliseum (4,497); Corvallis, OR
January 14, 2024; 1:00 p.m., P12N		at Oregon	L 68–70	10–7 (2–3)	23 – Williams	4 – Beh	7 – Pueyo	Matthew Knight Arena (N/A); Eugene, OR
January 19, 2024; 8:00 p.m., P12N		at Washington	L 60–62	10–8 (2–4)	18 – Gilbert	12 – Martinez	3 – Gilbert	Alaska Airlines Arena (2,090); Seattle, WA
January 21, 2024; 1:00 p.m., P12N		at Washington State	L 57–78	10–9 (2–5)	22 – Gilbert	11 – Gilbert	3 – Tied	Beasley Coliseum (1,232); Pullman, WA
January 26, 2024; 7:00 p.m., P12N		California	W 66–55	11–9 (3–5)	20 – Martinez	7 – Martinez	4 – Pueyo	McKale Center (7,268); Tucson, AZ
January 28, 2024; 12:00 p.m., P12N		No. 6 Stanford	L 64–96	11–10 (3–6)	24 – Blakley	4 – Tied	7 – Pueyo	McKale Center (7,692); Tucson, AZ
February 4, 2024; 12:00 p.m., P12N		Arizona State	W 63–52	12–10 (4–6)	18 – Martinez	15 – Martinez	4 – Pueyo	McKale Center (8,210); Tucson, AZ
February 9, 2024; 9:00 p.m., P12N		at No. 9 UCLA	L 58–66	12–11 (4–7)	16 – Martinez	8 – Martinez	2 – Tied	Pauley Pavilion (5,210); Los Angeles, CA
February 12, 2024; 7:00 p.m., ESPN2		at No. 10 USC	L 64–81	12–12 (4–8)	13 – Tied	7 – Martinez	3 – Tied	Galen Center (4,569); Los Angeles, CA
February 16, 2024; 6:00 p.m., P12N		Washington State	W 64–45	13–12 (5–8)	18 – Pueyo	8 – Jones	4 – Blakely	McKale Center (7,383); Tucson, AZ
February 18, 2024; 12:00 p.m., P12N		Washington	W 90–82 ^{3OT}	14–12 (6–8)	22 – Pueyo	8 – Pueyo	5 – Williams	McKale Center (7,354); Tucson, AZ
February 23, 2024; 8:00 p.m., P12N		at No. 3 Stanford	W 68–61	15–12 (7–8)	23 – Williams	9 – Martinez	5 – Pueyo	Maples Pavilion (4,423); Stanford, CA
February 25, 2024; 1:00 p.m., P12N		at California	W 87–68	16–12 (8–8)	20 – Martinez	9 – Martinez	7 – Martinez	Haas Pavilion (1,909); Berkeley, CA
February 29, 2024; 6:00 p.m., P12N		No. 7 USC	L 93–95 ^{2OT}	16–13 (8–9)	21 – Pueyo	9 – Pueyo	7 – Pueyo	McKale Center (7,594); Tucson, AZ
March 2, 2024; 6:00 p.m., P12N		No. 8 UCLA	L 41–61	16–14 (8–10)	16 – Pueyo	3 – Tied	3 – Tied	McKale Center (7,845); Tucson, AZ
Pac-12 Women's Tournament
March 6, 2024; 7:00 p.m., P12N	(7)	vs. (10) Washington; First Round	W 58–50	17–14	14 – Tied	7 – Cunningham	5 – Pueyo	MGM Grand Garden Arena (4,372); Paradise, NV
March 7, 2024; 7:00 p.m., P12N	(7)	vs. (2) No. 5 USC; Quarterfinals	L 62–65	17–15	19 – Pueyo	7 – Tied	6 – Pueyo	MGM Grand Garden Arena (N/A); Paradise, NV
NCAA Women's Tournament
March 21, 2024*; 4:00 p.m., ESPN2	(11 P3)	vs. (11 P3) Auburn; First Four	W 69–59	18–15	17 – Williams	7 – Martinez	4 – Pueyo	Harry A. Gampel Pavilion (533); Storrs, CT
March 23, 2024*; 12:30 p.m., ESPN2	(11 P3)	vs. (6 P3) No. 22 Syracuse; First round	L 69–74	18–16	24 – Jones	7 – Tied	5 – Jones	Harry A. Gampel Pavilion (10,299); Storrs, CT
*Non-conference game. ^{#}Rankings from AP Poll. (#) Tournament seedings in parentheses. All times are in Mountain Time.

== Rankings ==
Ranking movements Legend: ██ Increase in ranking ██ Decrease in ranking — = Not ranked RV = Received votes
	Week																			
Poll	Pre	1	2	3	4	5	6	7	8	9	10	11	12	13	14	15	16	17	18	Final
AP	RV	RV	RV																	Not released
Coaches	—	—	RV																	

== Media coverage ==
=== Radio ===
- ESPN Tucson - 1490 AM & 104.09 FM (ESPN Radio) and Nationwide - Dish Network, SiriusXM, Varsity Network and iHeartRadio)
- KCUB 1290 AM – Football Radio Show – (Tucson, AZ)
- KHYT – 107.5 FM (Tucson, AZ)
- KTKT 990 AM – La Hora de Los Gatos (Spanish) – (Tucson, AZ)
- KGME 910 AM – (IMG Sports Network) – (Phoenix, AZ)
- KTAN 1420 AM – (Sierra Vista, AZ)
- KDAP 96.5 FM (Douglas, Arizona)
- KWRQ 102.3 FM – (Safford, AZ/Thatcher, AZ)
- KIKO 1340 AM – (Globe, AZ)
- KVWM 970 AM – (Show Low, AZ/Pinetop-Lakeside, AZ)
- XENY 760 – (Nogales, Sonora) (Spanish)
- KTZR (1450 AM) - (FoxSports 1450) - (Tucson, AZ)

=== TV ===
- CBS Family – KOLD (CBS), CBSN
- ABC/ESPN Family – KGUN (ABC), ABC, ESPN, ESPN2, ESPNU, ESPN+,
- FOX Family – KMSB (FOX), FOX/FS1, FSN
- Pac-12 Network (Pac-12 Arizona)
- NBC Family – KVOA, NBC Sports, NBCSN
- PBS - KUAT
- Univision/Telemundo/Estrella TV - KUVE/KHRR/KUDF-LP (Spanish)

== See also ==
- 2023–24 Arizona Wildcats men's basketball team
