= 2023–24 UCLA Bruins women's basketball team =

American college basketball season

2023–24 UCLA Bruins women's basketball

NCAA tournament, Sweet Sixteen
- Conference: Pac-12 Conference

Ranking
- Coaches: No. 9
- AP: No. 10
- Record: 27–7 (13–5 Pac-12)
- Head coach: Cori Close (13th season)
- Associate head coach: Shannon Perry-LeBeauf
- Assistant coaches: Tasha Brown; Tony Newnan; Soh Matsuura
- Home arena: Pauley Pavilion (Capacity: 13,800)

2023–24 Pac-12 Conference women's basketball standings
	Conf.				Overall
Team	W		L	PCT	W		L	PCT
No. 9 Stanford	15	–	3	.833	30	–	6	.833
No. 5 USC †	13	–	5	.722	29	–	6	.829
No. 10 UCLA	13	–	5	.722	27	–	7	.794
No. 8 Oregon State	12	–	6	.667	27	–	8	.771
No. 15 Colorado	11	–	7	.611	24	–	10	.706
No. 22 Utah	11	–	7	.611	23	–	11	.676
Arizona	8	–	10	.444	18	–	16	.529
California	7	–	11	.389	19	–	15	.559
Washington State	7	–	11	.389	21	–	15	.583
Washington	6	–	12	.333	16	–	15	.516
Arizona State	3	–	15	.167	11	–	20	.355
Oregon	2	–	16	.111	11	–	21	.344
† 2024 Pac-12 tournament winner Rankings from AP Poll

The 2023–24 UCLA Bruins women's basketball team represented the University of California, Los Angeles during the 2023–24 NCAA Division I women's basketball season. The Bruins were led by 13th-year head coach Cori Close. They played their home games at Pauley Pavilion and competed as members of the Pac-12 Conference. This was the last season UCLA played in the Pac-12 Conference before moving to the Big Ten Conference on August 1, 2024.

Prior to the season, the Bruins secured the signing of highly touted center Lauren Betts, the former top-ranked high school recruit in the country who was transferring to UCLA from conference rival Stanford after one season in which she received limited playing time.

Going into the Cayman Islands classic, the Bruins were ranked number 2 in the AP poll, the highest in program history. They defeated the Paige Bueckers-led UConn Huskies in that tournament. During January and February 2024, the team faced a challenging set of conference games with top ten opponents. They would lose at number 9 USC, then go on the road to defeat number 3 ranked Colorado, but lose in overtime to number 16 Utah. Lauren Betts missed the next four games due to a medical issue that was not disclosed at the time, revealed later by Betts as depression and anxiety. During the Washington State game, the Bruins lost to a Cougar team led by Charlisse Leger-Walker, who suffered her season-ending injury in Pauly Pavilion. It was the highest-ranked opponent the Cougars ever had defeated. The game at Stanford would prove to be the difference between first and second place in the conference in what would be Tara VanDerveer's final season as the Cardinal coach.

The Bruins finished the season with a 27–7 record, including 13–5 in Pac-12 play to finish tied for second place with rival USC. They received an at-large bid to the 2024 NCAA Tournament, and they were eliminated in the sweet sixteen by LSU.

== Previous season ==
UCLA finished the season 27–10, 11–7 in Pac-12 play, to finish in a tie for fourth place. As the fifth seed in the Pac-12 tournament, they defeated Arizona State in the first round, Arizona in the quarterfinals, and Stanford in the semifinals before losing in the championship game to Washington State. They received an at-large bid to the NCAA tournament as a 4th seed in the Greenville Regional 1, where they defeated Sacramento State in the first round and Oklahoma in the second round to advance to the Sweet Sixteen for the first time since 2019, where they lost to 1-seed South Carolina.

== Offseason ==
Lauren Betts, ranked the number one player in the 2022 recruiting class by ESPN, joined what was already ranked the number one school recruiting group in the nation by ESPN in 2022.

=== Departures ===
UCLA departures
Name	Num.	Pos.	Height	Year	Hometown	Reason for departure
Brynn Masikewich	5	F	6'3"	Senior	Calgary, AB	Graduated; transferred to DePaul
Gina Conti	10	G	5'11"	GS	Grove City, OH	Graduated

=== Incoming ===
UCLA incoming transfers
Name	Num	Pos.	Height	Year	Hometown	Previous school
Lauren Betts	51	C	6'7"	Sophomore	Centennial, CO	Stanford

==== Recruiting ====
College recruiting
Name	Hometown	School	Height	Weight	Commit date
Amanda Muse; P	Brentwood, CA	Heritage High School	6 ft 4 in (1.93 m)	N/A	
Amanda Muse; P	Recruit ratings: ESPN: (95)				
Overall recruit ranking:
Note: In many cases, Scout, Rivals, 247Sports, On3, and ESPN may conflict in their listings of height and weight.; In these cases, the average was taken. ESPN grades are on a 100-point scale.; Sources: "2023 Player Commits". ESPN. Archived from the original on November 17, 2023.

==== Recruiting class of 2024 ====
College recruiting (2024)
Name	Hometown	School	Height	Weight	Commit date
Kendall Dudley; W	Centreville, VA	Sidwell Friends School	6 ft 2 in (1.88 m)	N/A	
Kendall Dudley; W	Recruit ratings: ESPN: (97)				
Avary Cain; G	Santa Maria, CA	Saint Joseph High School	6 ft 1 in (1.85 m)	N/A	
Avary Cain; G	Recruit ratings: ESPN: (96)				
Zania Socka-Nguemen; F	Washington, D.C.	Sidwell Friends School	6 ft 3 in (1.91 m)	N/A	
Zania Socka-Nguemen; F	Recruit ratings: ESPN: (96)				
Overall recruit ranking:
Note: In many cases, Scout, Rivals, 247Sports, On3, and ESPN may conflict in their listings of height and weight.; In these cases, the average was taken. ESPN grades are on a 100-point scale.; Sources: "2024 Player Commits". ESPN. Archived from the original on November 17, 2023.

== Roster ==
2023–24 UCLA Bruins women's basketball team
Players
Coaches

Pos.	#	Name	Height	Year	Previous school	Hometown
G	1	Kiki Rice	5 ft 11 in (1.8 m)	So	Sidwell Friends	Bethesda, MD
G	3	Londynn Jones	5 ft 4 in (1.63 m)	So	Centennial	Riverside, CA
F	11	Emily Bessoir (injured)	6 ft 4 in (1.93 m)	RS Jr	Wilhelm-Hausenstein Gymnasium	Munich, Germany
G	20	Charisma Osborne	5 ft 9 in (1.75 m)	GS	Windward School	Moreno Valley, CA
F	21	Lina Sontag	6 ft 3 in (1.91 m)	So	Schadow-Gymnasium	Kleinmachnow, Germany
F	22	Christeen Iwuala	6 ft 2 in (1.88 m)	So	Ronald Reagan	San Antonio, TX
F	23	Gabriela Jaquez	5 ft 11 in (1.8 m)	So	Camarillo	Camarillo, CA
F	32	Angela Dugalić	6 ft 4 in (1.93 m)	RS Jr	Maine West; Oregon	Des Plaines, IL
F	33	Amanda Muse	6 ft 4 in (1.93 m)	Fr	Heritage	Brentwood, CA
G	35	Camryn Brown	5 ft 11 in (1.8 m)	GS	Prestonwood Christian	Lewisville, TX
F	43	Izzy Anstey (injured)	6 ft 4 in (1.93 m)	RS Jr	Caulfield	Melbourne, Australia
C	51	Lauren Betts	6 ft 7 in (2.01 m)	So	Grandview; Stanford	Centennial, CO

Head coach

- Cori Close (UC Santa Barbara)

Assistant coach(es)

- Shannon Perry-LeBeauf (Iowa)
- Tony Newnan (UC Santa Barbara)
- Tasha Brown (St. Ambrose)
- Soh Matsuura (UCLA)

Legend

- (C) Team captain
- (S) Suspended
- (I) Ineligible
- (W) Walk-on
- Injured
- Current redshirt

Roster
Last update: April 2, 2024

== Schedule and results ==
Date time, TV	Rank^{#}	Opponent^{#}	Result	Record	High points	High rebounds	High assists	Site (attendance) city, state
Non-conference regular season
November 6, 2023*; 5:30 p.m., P12N	No. 4	Purdue	W 92–49	1–0	20 – tied	7 – Betts	10 – Rice	Pauley Pavilion (2,157); Los Angeles, CA
November 9, 2023*; 7:00 p.m.	No. 4	UC Riverside	W 90–52	2–0	18 – tied	15 – Betts	5 – Osborne	Pauley Pavilion (1,431); Los Angeles, CA
November 12, 2023*; 2:00 p.m.	No. 4	Bellarmine	W 113–64	3–0	30 – Jaquez	12 – Jaquez	4 – tied	Pauley Pavilion (1,625); Los Angeles, CA
November 17, 2023*; 11:30 a.m., P12N	No. 3	Princeton	W 77–74	4–0	22 – Betts	10 – Betts	3 – tied	Pauley Pavilion (6,243); Los Angeles, CA
November 24, 2023*; 4:30 p.m., FloSports	No. 2	vs. No. 6 UConn; Cayman Islands Classic	W 78–67	5–0	24 – Rice	11 – Rice	8 – Rice	John Gray Gymnasium (300); George Town, Cayman Islands
November 25, 2023*; 10:30 a.m., FloSports	No. 2	vs. Niagara; Cayman Islands Classic	W 97–46	6–0	23 – Jaquez	7 – tied	8 – Rice	John Gray Gymnasium (300); George Town, Cayman Islands
December 3, 2023*; 12:00 p.m., SECN+/ESPN+	No. 2	at Arkansas	W 81–66	7–0	20 – Betts	11 – Jaquez	6 – Osborne	Bud Walton Arena (4,261); Fayetteville, AR
December 7, 2023*; 7:00 p.m.	No. 2	Cal State Northridge	W 111–48	8–0	18 – tied	10 – Rice	10 – Rice	Pauley Pavilion (2,493); Los Angeles, CA
December 10, 2023*; 9:00 a.m., ESPN2	No. 2	vs. No. 20 Florida State; Basketball Hall of Fame Women's Showcase	W 95–78	9–0	22 – Betts	18 – Betts	6 – Rice	Mohegan Sun Arena; Uncasville, CT
December 18, 2023*; 3:30 p.m., FS1	No. 2	at No. 13 Ohio State	W 77–71	10–0	19 – Osborne	11 – Betts	4 – tied	Value City Arena (6,800); Columbus, OH
December 21, 2023*; 1:00 p.m.	No. 2	Hawaii	W 85–46	11–0	17 – Osborne	7 – Betts	6 – Rice	Pauley Pavilion (2,142); Los Angeles, CA
Pac-12 regular season
December 30, 2023; 5:00 p.m., P12N	No. 2	No. 6 USC; Rivalry	W 71–64	12–0 (1–0)	21 – Jones	8 – Betts	6 – Osborne	Pauley Pavilion (13,659); Los Angeles, CA
January 5, 2024; 7:00 p.m., P12N	No. 2	Oregon	W 75–49	13–0 (2–0)	17 – Dugalić	11 – Betts	10 – Rice	Pauley Pavilion (3,415); Los Angeles, CA
January 7, 2024; 1:00 p.m., P12N	No. 2	Oregon State	W 65–54	14–0 (3–0)	15 – Osborne	8 – tied	4 – Osborne	Pauley Pavilion (3,623); Los Angeles, CA
January 14, 2024; 2:00 p.m., P12N	No. 2	at No. 9 USC; Rivalry	L 65–73	14–1 (3–1)	25 – Osborne	10 – Dugalic	4 – Osborne	Galen Center (10,258); Los Angeles, CA
January 19, 2024; 5:00 p.m., P12N	No. 5	at No. 3 Colorado	W 76–68	15–1 (4–1)	22 – Osborne	13 – tied	2 – tied	CU Events Center (11,338); Boulder, CO
January 22, 2024; 4:00 p.m., ESPN2	No. 2	at No. 16 Utah	L 81–94 ^{OT}	15–2 (4–2)	21 – Jaquez	7 – Rice	3 – tied	Jon M. Huntsman Center (5,261); Salt Lake City, UT
January 26, 2024; 7:00 p.m., P12N	No. 2	Washington	W 62–44	16–2 (5–2)	17 – Osborne	13 – Dugalić	6 – Osborne	Pauley Pavilion (3,563); Los Angeles, CA
January 28, 2024; 1:00 p.m., P12N	No. 2	Washington State	L 82–85	16–3 (5–3)	25 – Rice	6 – tied	5 – tied	Pauley Pavilion (7,241); Los Angeles, CA
February 2, 2024; 7:00 p.m., P12N	No. 7	at California	W 78–58	17–3 (6–3)	32 – Osborne	4 – tied	4 – Osborne	Haas Pavilion (3,784); Berkeley, CA
February 4, 2024; 1:00 p.m., ESPN2	No. 7	at No. 4 Stanford	L 60–80	17–4 (6–4)	13 – tied	5 – tied	3 – Jones	Maples Pavilion (7,207); Stanford, CA
February 9, 2024; 8:00 p.m., P12N	No. 9	Arizona	W 66–58	18–4 (7–4)	21 – Jaquez	15 – Jaquez	6 – tied	Pauley Pavilion (5,210); Los Angeles, CA
February 11, 2024; 12:00 p.m., P12N	No. 9	Arizona State	W 78–45	19–4 (8–4)	18 – Betts	8 – Rice	5 – Brown	Pauley Pavilion (3,182); Los Angeles, CA
February 16, 2024; 7:00 p.m., P12N	No. 9	at No. 11 Oregon State	L 77–79	19–5 (8–5)	24 – Betts	7 – Betts	5 – Rice	Gill Coliseum (8,525); Corvallis, OR
February 18, 2024; 2:00 p.m., P12N	No. 9	at Oregon	W 74–55	20–5 (9–5)	17 – Betts	12 – Osborne	6 – Osborne	Matthew Knight Arena (6,792); Eugene, OR
February 22, 2024; 6:30 p.m., ESPN	No. 12	No. 18 Utah	W 82–52	21–5 (10–5)	23 – Jones	9 – Dugalic	7 – Osborne	Pauley Pavilion (3,711); Los Angeles, CA
February 26, 2024; 6:00 p.m., ESPN2	No. 8	No. 13 Colorado; Senior Night	W 53–45	22–5 (11–5)	20 – Rice	9 – tied	4 – Rice	Pauley Pavilion (5,319); Los Angeles, CA
February 29, 2024; 6:00 p.m., P12N	No. 8	at Arizona State	W 70–41	23–5 (12–5)	20 – Betts	11 – Betts	7 – Rice	Desert Financial Arena (1,871); Tempe, AZ
March 2, 2024; 5:00 p.m., P12N	No. 8	at Arizona	W 61–41	24–5 (13–5)	16 – Jones	12 – Betts	6 – Rice	McKale Center (7,845); Tucson, AZ
Pac-12 women's tournament
March 7, 2024; 8:30 p.m., P12N	(3) No. 7	vs. (6) No. 22 Utah; Quarterfinals	W 67–57	25–5	17 – Dugalić	9 – Rice	3 – tied	MGM Grand Garden Arena (4,901); Paradise, NV
March 8, 2024; 7:30 p.m., P12N	(3) No. 7	vs. (2) No. 5 USC; Semifinals/Rivalry	L 70–80 ^{2OT}	25–6	21 – Osborne	18 – Betts	6 – Rice	MGM Grand Garden Arena (5,713); Paradise, NV
NCAA women's tournament
March 23, 2024*; 6:30 p.m., ESPN2	(2 A2) No. 6	(15 A2) California Baptist; First round	W 84–55	26–6	20 – Rice	15 – Osborne	9 – Osborne	Pauley Pavilion (8,841); Los Angeles, CA
March 25, 2024*; 5:30 p.m., ESPN2	(2 A2) No. 6	(7 A2) No. 24 Creighton; Second round	W 67–63	27–6	24 – Rice	10 – Betts	4 – Osborne	Pauley Pavilion (7,839); Los Angeles, CA
March 30, 2024*; 10:00 a.m., ABC	(2 A2) No. 6	vs. (3 A2) No. 8 LSU; Sweet Sixteen	L 69–78	27–7	14 – tied	17 – Betts	5 – Rice	MVP Arena; Albany, NY
*Non-conference game. ^{#}Rankings from AP poll. (#) Tournament seedings in parentheses. A2=Albany 2. All times are in Pacific Time.

== Rankings ==
Ranking movements Legend: ██ Increase in ranking ██ Decrease in ranking т = Tied with team above or below ( ) = First-place votes
	Week																				
Poll	Pre	1	2	3	4	5	6	7	8	9	10	11	12	13	14	15	16	17	18	19	Final
AP	4	3	2	2	2	2	2	2	2 (1)	2 (1)	5	2	7	9	9	12	8	7	6	6	10
Coaches	8	3	2	2	2	2	2	2	2	2	5т	4	8	10	9	12	8	7	8	8	9

*The preseason and week 1 polls were the same.
^Coaches did not release a week 2 poll.

== Awards and honors ==
- February 29, 2024 – Coach Cori Close is the recipient of the 2024 WBCA Carol Eckman Integrity in Coaching Award
- March 5, 2024 – Lauren Betts, Kiki Rice, and Charisma Osborne named to the All-Pac-12 Team
- March 5, 2024 – Lauren Betts and Charisma Osborne named to the Pac-12 All-Defensive Team
- April 15, 2024 – Charisma Osborne is selected by the Phoenix Mercury with the 25th pick in the 2024 WNBA draft
