= 2023–24 Auburn Tigers women's basketball team =

Intercollegiate basketball season

2023–24 Auburn Tigers women's basketball

NCAA tournament, First Four
- Conference: Southeastern Conference
- Record: 20–12 (8–8 SEC)
- Head coach: Johnnie Harris (3rd season)
- Assistant coaches: Fred Williams; Damitria Buchanan; Savannah Carter; Ketara Chapel; Alex Stewart
- Home arena: Neville Arena

2023–24 SEC women's basketball standings
	Conf.				Overall
Team	W		L	PCT	W		L	PCT
No. 1 South Carolina †	16	–	0	1.000	38	–	0	1.000
No. 6 LSU	13	–	3	.813	31	–	6	.838
Ole Miss	12	–	4	.750	24	–	9	.727
Alabama	10	–	6	.625	24	–	10	.706
Tennessee	10	–	6	.625	20	–	13	.606
Vanderbilt	9	–	7	.563	23	–	10	.697
Mississippi State	8	–	8	.500	23	–	12	.657
Auburn	8	–	8	.500	20	–	12	.625
Texas A&M	6	–	10	.375	19	–	13	.594
Arkansas	6	–	10	.375	18	–	15	.545
Florida	5	–	11	.313	16	–	16	.500
Kentucky	4	–	12	.250	12	–	20	.375
Georgia	3	–	13	.188	12	–	18	.400
Missouri	2	–	14	.125	11	–	19	.367
† 2024 SEC tournament winner Rankings from AP poll

The 2023–24 Auburn Tigers women's basketball team represented Auburn University during the 2023–24 NCAA Division I women's basketball season. The Tigers, led by third-year head coach Johnnie Harris, played their home games at Neville Arena and competed as members of the Southeastern Conference (SEC).

== Previous season ==
The Tigers finished the season 16–15 (5–11 SEC) to finish in a tie for tenth in the SEC and received a bid to the WNIT, where they lost to Clemson in the second round.

== Offseason ==
=== Departures ===
Auburn Departures
Name	Number	Pos.	Height	Year	Hometown	Notes	Ref
Amoura Graves	0	G/F	6'0"	Sophomore	Ponchatoula, LA	Left team	
Mya Pratcher	1	F	6'1"	Freshman	Memphis, TN	Transferred to Jackson State	
Sania Wells	2	G	5'7"	Senior	Moss Point, MS	Transferred to Louisiana–Monroe	
Jakayla Johnson	3	G	5'9"	Junior	Clinton, MS	Transferred to Louisiana–Monroe	
Aicha Coulibaly	5	G	6'0"	Junior	Bamako, Mali	Transferred to Texas A&M	
Romi Levy	11	F	6'3"	Junior	Herzliya, Israel	Transferred to South Florida	
Kharyssa Richardson	33	F	6'2"	Freshman	Douglasville, GA	Transferred to Ole Miss	
Precious Johnson	51	C	6'5"	Junior	Baytown, TX	Left team	

=== 2023 recruiting class ===
College recruiting information
Name	Hometown	School	Height	Weight	Commit date
Yakiya Milton; F	Jacksonville, FL	Mandarin HS	6 ft 4 in (1.93 m)	N/A	
Yakiya Milton; F	Recruit ratings: No ratings found				
Savannah Scott; C	Conway, AR	Conway HS	6 ft 4 in (1.93 m)	N/A	
Savannah Scott; C	Recruit ratings: No ratings found				
Timya Thurman; C	Linden, AL	Linden HS	6 ft 5 in (1.96 m)	N/A	
Timya Thurman; C	Recruit ratings: No ratings found				
Overall recruit ranking:
Note: In many cases, Scout, Rivals, 247Sports, On3, and ESPN may conflict in their listings of height and weight.; In these cases, the average was taken. ESPN grades are on a 100-point scale.; Sources:

=== Incoming transfer ===
Auburn incoming transfers
Name	Number	Pos.	Height	Year	Hometown	Previous school
Celia Sumbane	1	F	6'2"	Junior	Maputo, Mozambique	South Plains College
JaMya Mingo-Young	2	G	5'8"	Graduate Student	Bogalusa, LA	Alabama
McKenna Eddings	3	G	6'0"	Junior	Williamsburg, VA	Moberly Area Community College
Taylen Collins	14	F	6'1"	Senior	Muldrow, OK	Oklahoma State
Kionna Gaines	15	G	5'9"	Junior	Columbus, GA	Clemson

== Roster ==
2023–24 Auburn Tigers women's basketball team
Players
Coaches

Pos.	#	Name	Height	Year	Previous school	Hometown
F	0	Yakiya Milton	6 ft 4 in (1.93 m)	Fr	Mandarin HS	Jacksonville, FL (United States) (Florida)
F	1	Celia Sumbane	6 ft 2 in (1.88 m)	Jr	Quinta dos Lombos; South Plains College	Maputo, Mozambique
G	2	JaMya Mingo-Young	5 ft 8 in (1.73 m)	GS	Loranger HS; Alabama	Bogalusa, LA (United States) (Louisiana)
G	3	McKenna Eddings	6 ft 0 in (1.83 m)	Jr	Warhill HS; Moberly Area CC	Williamsburg, VA (United States) (Virginia)
G	4	Kaitlyn Duhon	5 ft 10 in (1.78 m)	So	Summer Creek HS	Houston, TX (United States) (Texas)
G	5	Sydney Shaw	5 ft 9 in (1.75 m)	So	DME Academy	Miami, FL (United States) (Florida)
G	12	Mar'shaun Bostic	5 ft 8 in (1.73 m)	Jr	Vashon HS	St. Louis, MO (United States) (Missouri)
F	14	Taylen Collins	6 ft 1 in (1.85 m)	Sr	Muldrow HS; Oklahoma State	Muldrow, OK (United States) (Oklahoma)
G	15	Kionna Gaines	5 ft 9 in (1.75 m)	Jr	Carver HS; Clemson	Columbus, GA (United States) (Georgia (U.S. state))
C	20	Oyindamola Akinbolawa	6 ft 5 in (1.96 m)	So	Zenith League	Lagos, Nigeria
G	21	Audia Young	5 ft 9 in (1.75 m)	RS Fr	FSU School	Tallahassee, FL (United States) (Florida)
G	23	Honesty Scott-Grayson	5 ft 9 in (1.75 m)	GS	Riverdale Baptist School; Baylor	Brick, NJ (United States) (New Jersey)
G	24	Carsen McFadden	5 ft 8 in (1.73 m)	Sr	Lovejoy HS	Fairview, TX (United States) (Texas)
C	30	Savannah Scott	6 ft 4 in (1.93 m)	Fr	Conway HS	Conway, AR (United States) (Arkansas)
C	32	Timya Thurman	6 ft 5 in (1.96 m)	Fr	Linden HS	Linden, AL (United States) (Alabama)

Head coach

- Johnnie Harris (Arkansas Baptist)

Assistant coach(es)

- Fred Williams (Boise State)
- Damitria Buchanan (Texas A&M)
- Savannah Carter (Mississippi State)
- Ketara Chapel (Mississippi State)
- Alex Stewart (Georgia Tech)

Legend

- (C) Team captain
- (S) Suspended
- (I) Ineligible
- (W) Walk-on
- Injured
- Current redshirt

Roster

== Schedule ==
Date time, TV	Rank^{#}	Opponent^{#}	Result	Record	High points	High rebounds	High assists	Site (attendance) city, state
Non-conference regular season
October 30, 2023*; 7:00 p.m.		West Georgia	W 77–49		15 – Collins	8 – Mingo-Young	5 – Bostic	Neville Arena; Auburn, AL
November 2, 2023*; 7:00 p.m.		Columbus State	W 94–65		20 – Scott-Grayson	10 – Duhon	5 – Bostic	Neville Arena; Auburn, AL
Non-conference regular season
November 6, 2023*; 7:00 p.m., SECN+		Jacksonville State	W 78–49	1–0	14 – Scott-Grayson	8 – Scott	4 – Shaw	Neville Arena (2,232); Auburn, AL
November 9, 2023*; 7:00 p.m., SECN+		Louisiana	W 60–54	2–0	16 – Scott	14 – Collins	3 – Collins	Neville Arena (2,225); Auburn, AL
November 12, 2023*; 4:00 p.m., BTN		at Rutgers	W 76–56	3–0	21 – Scott	11 – Scott	4 – Scott–Grayson	Jersey Mike's Arena (1,619); Piscataway, NJ
November 17, 2023*; 7:00 p.m., SECN+		California	L 53–67	3–1	18 – Scott–Grayson	9 – Scott–Grayson	5 – Mingo–Young	Neville Arena (2,559); Auburn, AL
November 20, 2023*; 6:00 p.m.		at UCF	L 53–60	3–2	17 – Shaw	8 – Collins	4 – Mingo–Young	Addition Financial Arena (1,180); Orlando, FL
November 26, 2023*; 2:00 p.m., SECN+		Alabama A&M	W 68–45	4–2	15 – Shaw	10 – Collins	3 – Mingo–Young	Neville Arena (2,427); Auburn, AL
November 30, 2023*; 8:00 p.m., SECN		Clemson; ACC–SEC Challenge	W 83–53	5–2	18 – Scott–Grayson	6 – Shaw	5 – Scott–Grayson	Neville Arena (2,388); Auburn, AL
December 3, 2023*; 2:30 p.m.		at UAB	W 72–62	6–2	22 – Scott–Grayson	8 – Collins	4 – Scott–Grayson	Bartow Arena (861); Birmingham, AL
December 10, 2023*; 2:00 p.m.		at Little Rock	W 58–45	7–2	12 – Scott-Grayson	8 – Collins	4 – Mingo-Young	Jack Stephens Center (1,378); Little Rock, AR
December 13, 2023*; 7:00 p.m., SECN+		Alabama State	W 94–37	8–2	24 – Scott-Grayson	7 – Sumbane	6 – Mingo-Young	Neville Arena (2,246); Auburn, AL
December 16, 2023*; 2:00 p.m., SECN+		Norfolk State	W 67–39	9–2	16 – Mingo-Young	5 – Tied	4 – Mingo-Young	Neville Arena (2,396); Auburn, AL
December 20, 2023*; 2:00 p.m., SECN+		Washington State	W 69–62	10–2	17 – Scott-Grayson	7 – Mingo-Young	7 – Mingo-Young	Neville Arena (2,341); Auburn, AL
December 31, 2023*; 2:00 p.m., SECN+		North Alabama	W 79–58	11–2	14 – Eddings	10 – Mingo-Young	7 – Mingo-Young	Neville Arena (2,422); Auburn, AL
SEC regular season
January 4, 2024; 7:00 p.m., SECN+		Tennessee	L 67–75	11–3 (0–1)	17 – Bostic	6 – Collins	2 – Tied	Neville Arena (2,928); Auburn, AL
January 7, 2024; 3:00 p.m., SECN		at Texas A&M	L 44–66	11–4 (0–2)	15 – Scott-Grayson	8 – Mingo-Young	3 – Mingo-Young	Reed Arena (5,953); College Station, TX
January 11, 2024; 6:00 p.m., SECN+		at Ole Miss	L 55–58	11–5 (0–3)	16 – Scott-Grayson	6 – Akinbolawa	2 – Bostic	SJB Pavilion (2,350); Oxford, MS
January 14, 2024; 2:00 p.m., ESPN		No. 7 LSU	W 67–62	12–5 (1–3)	21 – Scott-Grayson	6 – Collins	5 – Mingo-Young	Neville Arena (7,720); Auburn, AL
January 18, 2024; 6:30 p.m., SECN+		at Vanderbilt	L 50–53	12–6 (1–4)	15 – Scott-Grayson	9 – Collins	6 – Scott-Grayson	Memorial Gymnasium (1,848); Nashville, TN
January 21, 2024; 2:00 p.m., SECN+		Alabama	W 78–65	13–6 (2–4)	19 – Scott-Grayson	9 – Mingo-Young	4 – Tied	Neville Arena (6,075); Auburn, AL
January 29, 2024; 6:00 p.m., SECN		Georgia	W 67–49	14–6 (3–4)	21 – Scott-Grayson	6 – Scott-Grayson	4 – Bostic	Neville Arena (3,165); Auburn, AL
February 1, 2024; 7:00 p.m., SECN+		No. 1 South Carolina	L 54–76	14–7 (3–5)	31 – Scott-Grayson	6 – Collins	4 – Mingo-Young	Neville Arena (4,814); Auburn, AL
February 4, 2024; 5:00 p.m., SECN		at Arkansas	L 72–74	14–8 (3–6)	27 – Scott-Grayson	11 – Collins	5 – Bostic	Bud Walton Arena (4,450); Fayetteville, AR
February 11, 2024; 3:00 p.m., SECN		at Missouri	W 70–59	15–8 (4–6)	24 – Scott-Grayson	11 – Mingo-Young	5 – Mingo-Young	Mizzou Arena (4,480); Columbia, MO
February 15, 2024; 6:00 p.m., SECN		Kentucky	W 78–50	16–8 (5–6)	22 – Scott-Grayson	11 – Collins	6 – Mingo-Young	Neville Arena (2,653); Auburn, AL
February 18, 2024; 2:00 p.m., SECN+		at Alabama	L 61–67	16–9 (5–7)	15 – Scott-Grayson	7 – Collins	6 – Mingo-Young	Coleman Coliseum (3,569); Tuscaloosa, AL
February 22, 2024; 8:00 p.m., SECN		at No. 13 LSU	L 66–71	16–10 (5–8)	28 – Scott-Grayson	6 – Mingo-Young	3 – Bostic	Pete Maravich Assembly Center (11,453); Baton Rouge, LA
February 25, 2024; 2:00 p.m., SECN+		Texas A&M	W 57–41	17–10 (6–8)	10 – Tied	7 – Tied	2 – Tied	Neville Arena (3,760); Auburn, AL
February 29, 2024; 7:00 p.m., SECN+		Mississippi State	W 77–60	18–10 (7–8)	32 – Scott-Grayson	8 – Mingo-Young	7 – Mingo-Young	Neville Arena (2,818); Auburn, AL
March 3, 2024; 11:00 a.m., SECN		at Florida	W 77–74	19–10 (8–8)	18 – Bostic	7 – Scott	9 – Bostic	O'Connell Center; Gainesville, FL
SEC Tournament
March 7, 2024; 5:00 p.m., SECN	(7)	vs. (10) Arkansas; Second Round	W 67–48	20–10	11 – Tied	8 – Mingo-Young	8 – Mingo-Young	Bon Secours Wellness Arena (7,187); Greenville, SC
March 8, 2024; 5:00 p.m., SECN	(7)	vs. (2) No. 8 LSU; Quarterfinals	L 48–78	20–11	15 – Eddings	6 – Collins	3 – Shaw	Bon Secours Wellness Arena (8,377); Greenville, SC
NCAA Tournament
March 21, 2024*; 6:00 p.m., ESPN2	(11 P3)	vs. (11 P3) Arizona; First Four	L 59–69	20–12	13 – Scott-Grayson	4 – Tied	6 – Bostic	Harry A. Gampel Pavilion (533); Storrs, CT
*Non-conference game. ^{#}Rankings from AP Poll. (#) Tournament seedings in parentheses. P3=Portland 3. All times are in Central Time.

== See also ==
- 2023–24 Auburn Tigers men's basketball team
