= 2024 NCAA Division I women's basketball tournament =

American college basketball tournament

- Season: 2023–24
- Teams: 68
- Finals site: Rocket Mortgage FieldHouse, Cleveland, Ohio
- Champions: South Carolina Gamecocks (3rd title, 3rd title game, 6th Final Four)
- Runner-up: Iowa Hawkeyes (2nd title game, 3rd Final Four)
- Semifinalists: NC State Wolfpack (2nd Final Four); UConn Huskies (23rd Final Four)
- Winning coach: Dawn Staley (3rd title)
- MOP: Kamilla Cardoso (South Carolina)

The 2024 NCAA Division I women's basketball tournament was a 68-team single-elimination tournament to determine the National Collegiate Athletic Association (NCAA) Division I college basketball national champion for the 2023–24 NCAA Division I women's basketball season. The 42nd edition of the tournament began on March 20, 2024, and concluded with the championship game on April 7, 2024 at Rocket Mortgage FieldHouse in Cleveland, Ohio.

This is the most recent appearance for Stanford Cardinal, who made 32 appearances before missing the tournament in 2025.

Big South champion Presbyterian, Southland champion Texas A&M–Corpus Christi, WAC champion California Baptist an at-large bid Columbia all made their NCAA tournament debuts. Additionally, Big Sky champion Eastern Washington made its second-ever appearance and first since 1987, Big West champion UC Irvine made its first appearance since 1995 and Sun Belt champion Marshall made its first appearance since 1997. In the championship game, Iowa returned for their second straight appearance while South Carolina entered their third championship game in seven years and became the tenth team in Division I women's tournament history to finish an undefeated season at 38–0.

This was the first time that the top #1 seed won both the Men's & Women's NCAA Tournament since 2012.

== Tournament procedure ==
A total of 68 teams participated in the 2024 tournament, consisting of the 32 conference champions, and 36 "at-large" bids that were determined by the NCAA Selection Committee. The last four at-large teams and teams seeded 65 through 68 overall competed in First Four games, whose winners advanced to the 64-team first round.

== Schedule and venues ==
The first two rounds, also referred to as the subregionals, were played at the sites of the top 16 seeds.

First Four

- March 20–21
- Four of the campuses seeded in the Top 16

Subregionals (first and second rounds)

- March 22 and 24 (Fri/Sun)
  - Colonial Life Arena, Columbia, South Carolina (host: University of South Carolina)
  - Gill Coliseum, Corvallis, Oregon (host: Oregon State University)
  - Moody Center, Austin, Texas (host: University of Texas at Austin)
  - Maples Pavilion, Stanford, California (host: Stanford University)
  - Bramlage Coliseum, Manhattan, Kansas (host: Kansas State University)
  - Pete Maravich Assembly Center, Baton Rouge, Louisiana (host: Louisiana State University)
  - Cassell Coliseum, Blacksburg, Virginia (host: Virginia Tech)
  - Value City Arena, Columbus, Ohio (host: Ohio State University)
- March 23 and 25 (Sat/Mon)
  - Simon Skjodt Assembly Hall, Bloomington, Indiana (host: Indiana University)
  - Purcell Pavilion, Notre Dame, Indiana (host: University of Notre Dame)
  - McCarthey Athletic Center, Spokane, Washington (host: Gonzaga University)
  - Reynolds Coliseum, Raleigh, North Carolina (host: North Carolina State University)
  - Carver–Hawkeye Arena, Iowa City, Iowa (host: University of Iowa)
  - Pauley Pavilion, Los Angeles, California (host: University of California, Los Angeles)
  - Galen Center, Los Angeles, California (host: University of Southern California)
  - Harry A. Gampel Pavilion, Storrs, Connecticut (host: University of Connecticut)

Regional semifinals and finals (Sweet Sixteen and Elite Eight)

- March 29 – April 1
  - Albany Regional, MVP Arena, Albany, New York (hosts: The Metro Atlantic Athletic Conference and Siena College)
  - Portland Regional, Moda Center, Portland, Oregon (host: Oregon State University)

National semifinals and championship (Final Four and Championship)

- April 5 and April 7
  - Rocket Mortgage FieldHouse, Cleveland, Ohio (hosts: Cleveland State University and the Mid-American Conference)

Cleveland hosted the women's Final Four for the second time; the first was in 2007.

== Qualification and selection of teams ==
=== Automatic qualifiers ===
The following teams automatically qualified for the 2024 NCAA field by virtue of winning their conference's tournament. (Note: Southern Indiana defeated UT Martin in the OVC championship. However, due to Southern Indiana's transition from Division II, UT Martin received the OVC's automatic bid.)

Automatic qualifiers
Conference	Team	Record	Appearance	Last bid
America East	Maine	24–9	10th	2019
American	Rice	19–14	4th	2019
Atlantic 10	Richmond	29–5	4th	2005
ACC	Notre Dame	26–6	29th	2023
ASUN	Florida Gulf Coast	29–4	10th	2023
Big 12	Texas	30–4	36th	2023
Big East	UConn	29–5	35th	2023
Big Sky	Eastern Washington	29–5	2nd	1987
Big South	Presbyterian	20–14	1st	Never
Big Ten	Iowa	29–4	30th	2023
Big West	UC Irvine	23–8	2nd	1995
CAA	Drexel	19–14	3rd	2021
CUSA	Middle Tennessee	29–4	21st	2023
Horizon	Green Bay	27–6	19th	2018
Ivy League	Princeton	25–4	11th	2023
MAAC	Fairfield	31–1	6th	2022
MAC	Kent State	21–10	6th	2002
MEAC	Norfolk State	27–5	3rd	2023
Missouri Valley	Drake	29–5	15th	2023
Mountain West	UNLV	30–2	11th	2023
NEC	Sacred Heart	24–9	5th	2023
Ohio Valley	UT Martin	16–16	5th	2014
Pac-12	USC	26–5	18th	2023
Patriot	Holy Cross	20–12	14th	2023
SEC	South Carolina	32–0	20th	2023
Southern	Chattanooga	28–4	17th	2023
Southland	Texas A&M–Corpus Christi	23–8	1st	Never
SWAC	Jackson State	26–6	7th	2022
Summit	South Dakota State	27–5	12th	2023
Sun Belt	Marshall	26–6	2nd	1997
WCC	Portland	21–12	6th	2023
WAC	California Baptist	28–3	1st	Never

=== Bids by state ===
The sixty-eight teams came from thirty-four states.

Participating teams in the 2024 tournament

Bids	State(s)	Schools
5	California	California Baptist, Stanford, UC Irvine, UCLA, USC
5	Tennessee	Chattanooga, Middle Tennessee, Tennessee, UT Martin, Vanderbilt
5	Texas	Baylor, Rice, Texas, Texas A&M, Texas A&M–Corpus Christi
3	Connecticut	Fairfield, Sacred Heart, UConn
3	Iowa	Drake, Iowa, Iowa State
3	North Carolina	Duke, NC State, North Carolina
3	Virginia	Norfolk State, Richmond, Virginia Tech
2	Alabama	Alabama, Auburn
2	Florida	Florida Gulf Coast, Florida State
2	Indiana	Indiana, Notre Dame
2	Kansas	Kansas, Kansas State
2	Michigan	Michigan, Michigan State
2	Mississippi	Jackson State, Ole Miss
2	Nebraska	Creighton, Nebraska
2	New York	Columbia, Syracuse
2	Ohio	Kent State, Ohio State
2	Oregon	Oregon State, Portland
2	South Carolina	Presbyterian, South Carolina
2	Washington	Gonzaga, Eastern Washington
2	West Virginia	Marshall, West Virginia
2	Wisconsin	Green Bay, Marquette
1	Arizona	Arizona
1	Colorado	Colorado
1	Kentucky	Louisville
1	Louisiana	LSU
1	Maine	Maine
1	Maryland	Maryland
1	Massachusetts	Holy Cross
1	Nevada	UNLV
1	New Jersey	Princeton
1	Oklahoma	Oklahoma
1	Pennsylvania	Drexel
1	South Dakota	South Dakota State
1	Utah	Utah

=== Bids by conference ===
Thirty-two conferences earned an automatic bid. In nineteen cases, the automatic bid was the only representative from the conference. Thirty-six additional at-large teams were selected from twelve of the conferences.

Bids	Conference	Teams
8	Atlantic Coast	Duke, Florida State, Louisville, North Carolina, NC State, Notre Dame, Syracuse, Virginia Tech
8	Southeastern	Alabama, Auburn, LSU, Ole Miss, South Carolina, Tennessee, Texas A&M, Vanderbilt
7	Big 12	Baylor, Iowa State, Kansas, Kansas State, Oklahoma, Texas, West Virginia
7	Big Ten	Indiana, Iowa, Maryland, Michigan, Michigan State, Nebraska, Ohio State
7	Pac-12	Arizona, Colorado, Oregon State, Stanford, UCLA, USC, Utah
3	Big East	Creighton, Marquette, UConn
2	Ivy	Columbia, Princeton
2	West Coast	Gonzaga, Portland
1	America East	Maine
1	American	Rice
1	Atlantic 10	Richmond
1	Atlantic Sun	Florida Gulf Coast
1	Big Sky	Eastern Washington
1	Big South	Presbyterian
1	Big West	UC Irvine
1	Coastal	Drexel
1	Conference USA	Middle Tennessee
1	Horizon	Green Bay
1	Metro Atlantic	Fairfield
1	Mid-American	Kent State
1	Mid-Eastern	Norfolk State
1	Missouri Valley	Drake
1	Mountain West	UNLV
1	Northeast	Sacred Heart
1	Ohio Valley	UT Martin
1	Patriot	Holy Cross
1	Southern	Chattanooga
1	Southland	Texas A&M–Corpus Christi
1	Southwestern	Jackson State
1	Summit	South Dakota State
1	Sun Belt	Marshall
1	Western Athletic	California Baptist

=== Seeds ===
The tournament seeds and regions were determined through the NCAA basketball tournament selection process and were published by the selection committee after the brackets were released on March 17.

Albany Regional 1 – MVP Arena, Albany, NY
Seed	School	Conference	Record	Overall seed	Berth type	Last bid
1	South Carolina	SEC	32–0		Automatic	2023
2	Notre Dame	ACC	26–6		Automatic	2023
3	Oregon State	Pac-12	24–7		At-large	2021
4	Indiana	Big Ten	24–5		At-large	2023
5	Oklahoma	Big 12	22–9		At-large	2023
6	Nebraska	Big Ten	22–11		At-large	2022
7	Ole Miss	SEC	23–8		At-large	2023
8	North Carolina	ACC	19–12		At-large	2023
9	Michigan State	Big Ten	22–8		At-large	2021
10	Marquette	Big East	23–8		At-large	2023
11	Texas A&M	SEC	19–12		At-large	2021
12	Florida Gulf Coast	ASUN	29–4		Automatic	2023
13	Fairfield	MAAC	31–1		Automatic	2022
14	Eastern Washington	Big Sky	29–5		Automatic	1987
15	Kent State	MAC	21–10		Automatic	2002
16*	Sacred Heart	Northeast	24–9		Automatic	2023
16*	Presbyterian	Big South	20–14		Automatic	Never

Portland Regional 4 – Moda Center, Portland, Oregon
Seed	School	Conference	Record	Overall seed	Berth type	Last bid
1	Texas	Big 12	30–4		Automatic	2023
2	Stanford	Pac-12	28–5		At-large	2023
3	NC State	ACC	27–6		At-large	2023
4	Gonzaga	WCC	30–3		At-large	2023
5	Utah	Pac-12	22–10		At-large	2023
6	Tennessee	SEC	19–12		At-large	2023
7	Iowa State	Big 12	20–11		At-large	2022
8	Alabama	SEC	23–9		At-large	2023
9	Florida State	ACC	23–10		At-large	2023
10	Maryland	Big Ten	19–13		At-large	2023
11	Green Bay	Horizon	27–6		Automatic	2018
12	South Dakota State	Summit	27–5		Automatic	2023
13	UC Irvine	Big West	23–8		Automatic	1995
14	Chattanooga	Southern	28–4		Automatic	2023
15	Norfolk State	MEAC	27–5		Automatic	2023
16	Drexel	Coastal	19–14		Automatic	2021

Albany Regional 2 – MVP Arena, Albany, NY
Seed	School	Conference	Record	Overall seed	Berth type	Last bid
1	Iowa	Big Ten	29–4		Automatic	2023
2	UCLA	Pac-12	25–6		At-large	2023
3	LSU	SEC	28–5		At-large	2023
4	Kansas State	Big 12	25–7		At-large	2022
5	Colorado	Pac-12	22–9		At-large	2023
6	Louisville	ACC	24–9		At-large	2023
7	Creighton	Big East	25–5		At-large	2023
8	West Virginia	Big 12	24–7		At-large	2023
9	Princeton	Ivy League	25–4		Automatic	2023
10	UNLV	Mountain West	30–2		Automatic	2023
11	Middle Tennessee	C-USA	29–4		Automatic	2023
12	Drake	Missouri Valley	29–5		Automatic	2023
13	Portland	WCC	21–12		Automatic	2023
14	Rice	American	19–14		Automatic	2019
15	California Baptist	WAC	28–3		Automatic	Never
16*	Holy Cross	Patriot	20–12		Automatic	2023
16*	UT Martin	Ohio Valley	16–16		Automatic	2014

Portland Regional 3 – Moda Center, Portland, Oregon
Seed	School	Conference	Record	Overall seed	Berth type	Last bid
1	USC	Pac-12	26–5		Automatic	2023
2	Ohio State	Big Ten	25–5		At-large	2023
3	UConn	Big East	29–5		Automatic	2023
4	Virginia Tech	ACC	24–7		At-large	2023
5	Baylor	Big 12	24–7		At-large	2023
6	Syracuse	ACC	23–7		At-large	2021
7	Duke	ACC	20–11		At-large	2023
8	Kansas	Big 12	19–12		At-large	2022
9	Michigan	Big Ten	20–13		At-large	2023
10	Richmond	Atlantic 10	29–5		Automatic	2005
11*	Auburn	SEC	20–11		At-large	2019
11*	Arizona	Pac-12	17–15		At-large	2023
12*	Vanderbilt	SEC	22–9		At-large	2014
12*	Columbia	Ivy League	23–6		At-large	Never
13	Marshall	Sun Belt	26–6		Automatic	1997
14	Jackson State	SWAC	26–6		Automatic	2022
15	Maine	America East	24–9		Automatic	2019
16	Texas A&M–Corpus Christi	Southland	23–8		Automatic	Never

*See First Four

== Tournament bracket ==
All times are listed in Eastern Daylight Time (UTC−4)

=== First Four ===
The First Four games involve eight teams: the four lowest-seeded automatic qualifiers and the four lowest-seeded at-large teams.

March 20 – Albany Regional 1 Columbia, South Carolina
16	Sacred Heart	42
16	Presbyterian	49

March 21 – Portland Regional 3 Storrs, Connecticut
11	Auburn	59
11	Arizona	69

March 21 – Albany Regional 2 Iowa City, Iowa
16	Holy Cross	72
16	UT Martin	45

March 20 – Portland Regional 3 Blacksburg, Virginia
12	Vanderbilt	72
12	Columbia	68

=== Albany regional 1 – Albany, NY ===
First round Round of 64; March 22–23
1	South Carolina	91
16	Presbyterian	39
Columbia, South Carolina – Fri/Sun
8	North Carolina	59
9	Michigan State	56
5	Oklahoma	73
12	Florida Gulf Coast	70
Bloomington, Indiana – Sat/Mon
4	Indiana	89
13	Fairfield	56
6	Nebraska	61
11	Texas A&M	59
Corvallis, Oregon – Fri/Sun
3	Oregon State	73
14	Eastern Washington	51
7	Ole Miss	67
10	Marquette	55
Notre Dame, Indiana – Sat/Mon
2	Notre Dame	81
15	Kent State	67

Second round Round of 32; March 24–25
1	South Carolina	88
8	North Carolina	41
5	Oklahoma	68
4	Indiana	75
6	Nebraska	51
3	Oregon State	61
7	Ole Miss	56
2	Notre Dame	71

Regional semifinals Sweet 16; March 29
1	South Carolina	79
4	Indiana	75
3	Oregon State	70
2	Notre Dame	65

Regional final Elite 8 March 31
1	South Carolina	70
3	Oregon State	58

==== Albany regional 1 final ====
ABC

March 31
1:00 p.m. EDT

No. 1 South Carolina 70, No. 3 Oregon State 58
Scoring by quarter: 18—14, 19–19, 21—13, 12–12
Pts: Tessa Johnson (15); Rebs: Ashlyn Watkins (14); Asts: Raven Johnson (6)	Pts: Raegan Beers (16); Rebs: Timea Gardiner (12); Asts: Tied (5)

MVP Arena – Albany, NY
Attendance: 13,568
Referees: Felicia Grinter, Talisa Green, Tyler Trimble

==== Albany regional 1 all-tournament team ====
- Kamilla Cardoso (MOP) – South Carolina
- Raven Johnson – South Carolina
- Raegan Beers – Oregon State
- Timea Gardiner – Oregon State
- Sydney Parrish – Indiana

=== Portland regional 4 – Portland, OR ===
First round Round of 64; March 22–23
1	Texas	82
16	Drexel	42
Austin, Texas – Fri/Sun
8	Alabama	82
9	Florida State	74
5	Utah	68
12	South Dakota State	54
Spokane, Washington – Sat/Mon
4	Gonzaga	75
13	UC Irvine	56
6	Tennessee	92
11	Green Bay	63
Raleigh, North Carolina – Sat/Mon
3	NC State	64
14	Chattanooga	45
7	Iowa State	93
10	Maryland	86
Stanford, California – Fri/Sun
2	Stanford	79
15	Norfolk State	50

Second round Round of 32; March 24–25
1	Texas	65
8	Alabama	54
5	Utah	66
4	Gonzaga	77
6	Tennessee	72
3	NC State	79
7	Iowa State	81
2	Stanford	87^{OT}

Regional semifinals Sweet 16; March 29
1	Texas	69
4	Gonzaga	47
3	NC State	77
2	Stanford	67

Regional final Elite 8 March 31
1	Texas	66
3	NC State	76

==== Portland 4 regional final ====
ABC

March 31
3:00 p.m. EDT

No. 1 Texas 66, No. 3 NC State 76
Scoring by quarter: 14–19, 17–24, 17–14, 18–19
Pts: Booker (17); Rebs: Moore (9); Asts: Booker (5)	Pts: James (27); Rebs: James (6); Asts: Rivers (5)

Moda Center – Portland, OR
Referees: In'Fini Robinson, Katie Lukanich, Gina Cross

==== Portland 4 regional all-tournament team ====
- Aziaha James (MOP) – NC State
- Saniya Rivers – NC State
- Aaliyah Moore – Texas
- Shay Holle – Texas
- Kiki Iriafen – Stanford

=== Albany regional 2 – Albany, New York ===
First round Round of 64; March 22–23
1	Iowa	91
16	Holy Cross	65
Iowa City, Iowa – Sat/Mon
8	West Virginia	63
9	Princeton	53
5	Colorado	86
12	Drake	72
Manhattan, Kansas – Fri/Sun
4	Kansas State	78
13	Portland	65
6	Louisville	69
11	Middle Tennessee	71
Baton Rouge, Louisiana – Fri/Sun
3	LSU	70
14	Rice	60
7	Creighton	87
10	UNLV	73
Los Angeles, California – Sat/Mon
2	UCLA	84
15	California Baptist	55

Second round Round of 32; March 24–25
1	Iowa	64
8	West Virginia	54
5	Colorado	63
4	Kansas State	50
11	Middle Tennessee	56
3	LSU	83
7	Creighton	63
2	UCLA	67

Regional semifinals Sweet 16; March 30
1	Iowa	89
5	Colorado	68
3	LSU	78
2	UCLA	69

Regional final Elite 8 April 1
1	Iowa	94
3	LSU	87

==== Albany regional 2 final ====
ESPN

April 1
7:15 p.m. EDT

No. 1 Iowa 94, No. 3 LSU 87
Scoring by quarter: 26–31, 19–14, 24–13, 25–29
Pts: Clark (41); Rebs: Clark (7); Asts: Clark (12)	Pts: Johnson (23); Rebs: Reese (20); Asts: Reese (4)

MVP Arena – Albany, New York

==== Albany regional 2 all-tournament team ====
- Caitlin Clark (MOP) – Iowa
- Lauren Betts – UCLA
- Angel Reese – LSU
- Flau'jae Johnson – LSU
- Sydney Affolter – Iowa

=== Portland regional 3 – Portland, Oregon ===
First round Round of 64; March 22–23
1	USC	87
16	Texas A&M–Corpus Christi	55
Los Angeles, California – Sat/Mon
8	Kansas	81^{OT}
9	Michigan	72
5	Baylor	80
12	Vanderbilt	63
Blacksburg, Virginia – Fri/Sun
4	Virginia Tech	92
13	Marshall	49
6	Syracuse	74
11	Arizona	69
Storrs, Connecticut – Sat/Mon
3	UConn	86
14	Jackson State	64
7	Duke	72
10	Richmond	61
Columbus, Ohio – Fri/Sun
2	Ohio State	80
15	Maine	57

Second round Round of 32; March 24–25
1	USC	73
8	Kansas	55
5	Baylor	75
4	Virginia Tech	72
6	Syracuse	64
3	UConn	72
7	Duke	75
2	Ohio State	63

Regional semifinals Sweet 16; March 30
1	USC	74
5	Baylor	70
3	UConn	53
7	Duke	45

Regional final Elite 8 April 1
1	USC	73
3	UConn	80

==== Portland regional 3 final ====
ESPN

April 1
9:15 p.m. EDT

No. 1 USC Trojans 73, No. 3 UConn Huskies 80
Scoring by quarter: 17–15, 16–18, 18–22, 22–25
Pts: JuJu Watkins (29); Rebs: Rayah Marshall (11); Asts: McKenzie Forbes (3)	Pts: Paige Bueckers (28); Rebs: Paige Bueckers (10); Asts: Nika Mühl (8)

Moda Center – Portland, Oregon
Attendance: 10,869
Referees: Maj Forsberg, Kyle Bacon, Brian Hall

==== Portland regional 3 all-tournament team ====
- Paige Bueckers (MOP) – UConn
- Rayah Marshall – USC
- McKenzie Forbes – USC
- JuJu Watkins – USC
- Aaliyah Edwards – UConn

=== Final Four – Cleveland, Ohio ===
National semifinals Final Four; Friday, April 5
A1(1)	South Carolina	78
P4(3)	NC State	59
A2(1)	Iowa	71
P3(3)	UConn	69

National Championship Game; Sunday, April 7
A1(1)	South Carolina	87
A2(1)	Iowa	75

==== National semifinals ====
ESPN

April 5
7:00 p.m. EDT

A1 South Carolina Gamecocks 78, P4 NC State Wolfpack 59
Scoring by quarter: 16–16, 16–15, 29–6, 17–22
Pts: Kamilla Cardoso (22); Rebs: Ashlyn Watkins (20); Asts: Te-Hina Paopao (6)	Pts: Aziaha James (20); Rebs: River Baldwin (9); Asts: Tied (2)

Rocket Mortgage FieldHouse – Cleveland, Ohio
Referees: Eric Brewton, Melissa Barlow, Tiffany Bird

ESPN

April 5
9:30 p.m. EDT

A2 Iowa Hawkeyes 71, P3 UConn Huskies 69
Scoring by quarter: 14–19, 12–13, 25–19, 20–18
Pts: Hannah Stuelke (23); Rebs: Caitlin Clark (9); Asts: Caitlin Clark (7)	Pts: Tied (17); Rebs: Aaliyah Edwards (8); Asts: Nika Mühl (7)

Rocket Mortgage FieldHouse – Cleveland, Ohio
Attendance: 18,284
Referees: Roy Gulbeyan, Gina Cross, Katie Lukanich

==== National championship ====
ABC, ESPN

April 7, 2024
3:00 p.m. EDT

A1 South Carolina Gamecocks 87, A2 Iowa Hawkeyes 75
Scoring by quarter: 20–27, 29–19, 19–13, 19–16
Pts: Tessa Johnson (19); Rebs: Kamilla Cardoso (17); Asts: MiLaysia Fulwiley (4)	Pts: Caitlin Clark (30); Rebs: Caitlin Clark (8); Asts: Caitlin Clark (5)

Rocket Mortgage FieldHouse – Cleveland, Ohio

==== Final Four all-tournament team ====
- Kamilla Cardoso (MOP) – South Carolina
- Tessa Johnson – South Carolina
- Caitlin Clark – Iowa
- Hannah Stuelke – Iowa
- Paige Bueckers – UConn

=== Record by conference ===
Conference	Bids	Record	Win %	FF	R64	R32	S16	E8	F4	CG	NC
Southeastern	8	13–7	.650	2	7	5	2	2	1	1	1
Big Ten	7	9–7	.563	–	7	4	2	1	1	1	–
Big East	3	5–3	.625	–	3	2	1	1	1	–	–
Atlantic Coast	8	11–8	.579	–	8	6	3	1	1	–	–
Pac-12	7	14–7	.667	1	7	6	5	2	–	–	–
Big 12	7	10–7	.588	–	7	7	2	1	–	–	–
West Coast	2	2–2	.500	–	2	1	1	–	–	–	–
CUSA	1	1–1	.500	–	1	1	–	–	–	–	–
Big South	1	1–1	.500	1	1	–	–	–	–	–	–
Patriot	1	1–1	.500	1	1	–	–	–	–	–	–
America East	1	0–1	.000	–	1	–	–	–	–	–	–
American	1	0–1	.000	–	1	–	–	–	–	–	–
Atlantic 10	1	0–1	.000	–	1	–	–	–	–	–	–
ASUN	1	0–1	.000	–	1	–	–	–	–	–	–
Big Sky	1	0–1	.000	–	1	–	–	–	–	–	–
Big West	1	0–1	.000	–	1	–	–	–	–	–	–
CAA	1	0–1	.000	–	1	–	–	–	–	–	–
Horizon	1	0–1	.000	–	1	–	–	–	–	–	–
Ivy League	2	0–2	.000	1	1	–	–	–	–	–	–
MAAC	1	0–1	.000	–	1	–	–	–	–	–	–
MAC	1	0–1	.000	–	1	–	–	–	–	–	–
MEAC	1	0–1	.000	–	1	–	–	–	–	–	–
Missouri Valley	1	0–1	.000	–	1	–	–	–	–	–	–
Mountain West	1	0–1	.000	–	1	–	–	–	–	–	–
Southern	1	0–1	.000	–	1	–	–	–	–	–	–
Southland	1	0–1	.000	–	1	–	–	–	–	–	–
SWAC	1	0–1	.000	–	1	–	–	–	–	–	–
Summit	1	0–1	.000	–	1	–	–	–	–	–	–
Sun Belt	1	0–1	.000	–	1	–	–	–	–	–	–
WAC	1	0–1	.000	–	1	–	–	–	–	–	–
Northeast	1	0–1	.000	1	–	–	–	–	–	–	–
Ohio Valley	1	0–1	.000	1	–	–	–	–	–	–	–

- The FF, R64, R32, S16, E8, F4, CG, and NC columns indicate how many teams from each conference were in the first four, round of 64 (first round), round of 32 (second round), Sweet 16, Elite Eight, Final Four, championship game, and national champion, respectively.

== Game summaries and tournament notes ==
=== Tournament upsets ===
Per the NCAA, an upset occurs "when the losing team in an NCAA tournament game was seeded at least five seed lines better than the winning team."

Round	Albany	Portland	Albany	Portland
First round	None	None	No. 11 Middle Tennessee defeated No. 6 Louisville, 71–69	None
Second round	None	None	None	No. 7 Duke defeated No. 2 Ohio State, 75–63
Sweet 16	None	None	None	None
Elite 8	None	None	None	None
Final 4	None			
National championship	None			

== Media coverage ==
=== Most watched tournament games ===
(#) Tournament seedings and region in parentheses.

The Albany 2 regional final between Iowa and LSU, a rematch of the previous year's national championship game drew the largest audience ever for a women's college basketball game as well as the most watched college basketball game in the 45-year history of ESPN. The record would last only a few days, as Iowa's national semifinal match with Connecticut averaged the most viewers for a basketball game at any level on ESPN. The Championship game again broke this record, with it becoming the most watched basketball game (including the NBA) since 2019 and the most watched basketball game to air outside of prime-time since the Fab Five played in the men's Final Four in 1992.

Rank	Round	Date and time (ET)	Matchup	Network	Viewers (millions)	TV rating
1	Championship Game	April 7; 3:00 p.m.	(A2-1)Iowa vs. (A1-1)South Carolina	ABC	18.89	9.3
1	Final Four	April 5; 9:30 p.m.	(A2-1)Iowa vs. (P3-3)UConn	ESPN	14.2	
2	Elite 8	April 1; 7:12 p.m.	(1)Iowa vs. (3)LSU (Albany 2)	ESPN	12.3	
3	Final Four	April 5; 7 p.m.	(A1-1)South Carolina vs. (P4-3)NC State	ESPN	7.1	
4	Sweet 16	March 30; 3:50 p.m.	(1)Iowa vs. (5)Colorado (Albany 2)	ABC	6.9	3.6

=== Television ===
ESPN broadcast each game of the tournament across either ESPN, ESPN2, ESPNU, ESPNEWS, or ABC. For the second consecutive season, the national championship game aired on ABC.

ESPN's The Pat McAfee Show broadcast live from Iowa City for the Iowa Hawkeyes' first-round game. ESPN provided Megacast coverage during the Final Four and national championship games, with the Bird & Taurasi Show alternate broadcast with Sue Bird and Diana Taurasi returning on ESPN2 and ESPN during the Final Four and national championship respectively, and the "Beyond the Rim" (additional statistics) and rail cam feeds available on ESPN+.

==== Studio host and analysts ====
- Elle Duncan (host) (first four, first/second rounds, regionals, Final Four, and national championship)
- Kelsey Riggs (host) (first/second rounds)
- Rebecca Lobo (analyst) (first four, and first/second rounds)
- Andraya Carter (analyst) (first four, first/second rounds, regionals, Final Four and national championship)
- Chiney Ogwumike (analyst) (first/second rounds, regionals, Final Four and national championship)
- Carolyn Peck (analyst) (Final Four and national championship)
- Nikki Fargas (analyst) (first/second rounds)
- Aliyah Boston (analyst) (Final Four and national championship)
- Lisa Mattingly (rules analyst) (first four, first/second rounds, regionals, Final Four, and national championship)
- Denny Meyer (rules analyst) (Final Four and national championship)

==== Commentary teams ====
First Four

- Courtney Lyle and Carolyn Peck – Columbia, South Carolina
- Jay Alter and Kelly Gramlich – Blacksburg, Virginia
- Pam Ward and Christy Winters-Scott – Storrs, Connecticut
- Beth Mowins, Stephanie White, and Holly Rowe – Iowa City, Iowa

First & second rounds Friday/Sunday (subregionals)

- Courtney Lyle and Carolyn Peck – Columbia, South Carolina
- Jason Ross Jr. and Aja Ellison – Corvallis, Oregon
- Tiffany Greene and Jimmy Dykes – Austin, Texas
- Roy Philpott and Brooke Weisbrod – Stanford, California
- Brenda VanLengen and Holly Warlick – Manhattan, Kansas
- Dave O'Brien and Christy Thomaskutty – Baton Rouge, Louisiana
- Jay Alter and Kelly Gramlich – Blacksburg, Virginia
- Matt Schumacker and Meghan McKeown – Columbus, Ohio

First & second rounds Saturday/Monday (subregionals)

- Angel Gray and Andrea Lloyd-Curry – Bloomington, Indiana
- Sam Gore and Tamika Catchings – Notre Dame, Indiana
- Ann Schatz and Mike Thibault – Spokane, Washington
- Eric Frede and Steffi Sorensen – Raleigh, North Carolina
- Beth Mowins, Stephanie White, and Holly Rowe – Iowa City, Iowa
- Kevin Fitzgerald and Kim Adams – Los Angeles, California (UCLA)
- Elise Woodward and Mary Murphy – Los Angeles, California (USC)
- Pam Ward and Christy Winters-Scott – Storrs, Connecticut

Regionals (Sweet 16 and Elite Eight)

- Pam Ward, Stephanie White, and Holly Rowe – Albany, New York (Regional 1 – Sweet 16 games only)
- Courtney Lyle, Carolyn Peck, and Brooke Weisbrod – Portland, Oregon (Regional 4)
- Ryan Ruocco, Rebecca Lobo, and Holly Rowe – Albany, New York (Regional 2 – Sweet 16/Regionals 1 & 2 – Elite Eight)
- Beth Mowins, Debbie Antonelli, and Angel Gray – Portland, Oregon (Regional 3)

Final Four and National Championship

- Ryan Ruocco, Rebecca Lobo, and Holly Rowe – Cleveland, Ohio

=== Radio ===
Westwood One served as radio broadcaster of the tournament.

Regionals (Sweet 16 and Elite Eight)

- Sam Neidermann and Isis Young – Albany, New York 1
- Troy Clardy and Debbie Antonelli – Portland, Oregon 4
- Lance Medow and Kim Adams – Albany, New York 2
- Matt Chazanow and Krista Blunk – Portland, Oregon 3

Final Four and National Championship

- Ryan Radtke, Debbie Antonelli, and Ros Gold-Onwude – Cleveland, Ohio

== Racism incident ==
On March 21, 2024, the Utah Utes team and staff were arriving at a local restaurant in Coeur d'Alene, the location of their hotel, when they were jeered at and called racial slurs by men driving pickup trucks displaying a Confederate flag. The team was relocated to Spokane for the remainder of their games.

== See also ==
- 2024 NCAA Division I men's basketball tournament
- 2024 NCAA Division II women's basketball tournament
- 2024 NCAA Division III women's basketball tournament
- 2024 NAIA women's basketball tournament
