= 2023–24 Stanford Cardinal women's basketball team =

Intercollegiate basketball season

2023–24 Stanford Cardinal women's basketball

Ball Dawgs Classic champions Pac-12 regular season champions

NCAA tournament, Sweet Sixteen
- Conference: Pac-12 Conference

Ranking
- Coaches: No. 8
- AP: No. 9
- Record: 30–6 (15–3 Pac-12)
- Head coach: Tara VanDerveer (38th season)
- Associate head coach: Kate Paye (17th season)
- Assistant coaches: Katy Steding (4th season); Tempie Brown (8th season); Erica McCall (1st season)
- Home arena: Maples Pavilion

2023–24 Pac-12 Conference women's basketball standings
	Conf.				Overall
Team	W		L	PCT	W		L	PCT
No. 9 Stanford	15	–	3	.833	30	–	6	.833
No. 5 USC †	13	–	5	.722	29	–	6	.829
No. 10 UCLA	13	–	5	.722	27	–	7	.794
No. 8 Oregon State	12	–	6	.667	27	–	8	.771
No. 15 Colorado	11	–	7	.611	24	–	10	.706
No. 22 Utah	11	–	7	.611	23	–	11	.676
Arizona	8	–	10	.444	18	–	16	.529
California	7	–	11	.389	19	–	15	.559
Washington State	7	–	11	.389	21	–	15	.583
Washington	6	–	12	.333	16	–	15	.516
Arizona State	3	–	15	.167	11	–	20	.355
Oregon	2	–	16	.111	11	–	21	.344
† 2024 Pac-12 tournament winner Rankings from AP Poll

The 2023–24 Stanford Cardinal women's basketball team represented Stanford University during the 2023–24 NCAA Division I women's basketball season. The Cardinal were led by 38th-year head coach Tara VanDerveer, and played their home games at Maples Pavilion as members of the Pac-12 Conference. They finished the season at 30–6, 15–3 in Pac-12 play to win the regular season championship. As a No. 1 seed in the Pac-12 Tournament, they defeated California in the quarterfinals and Oregon State in the semifinals before losing to USC in the championship. They received an at-large bid to the NCAA Tournament as a No. 2 seed in the Portland regional 4 bracket where they defeated Norfolk State and Iowa State in the first and second rounds before losing to NC State in the Sweet Sixteen.

After the season's conclusion, VanDerveer announced her retirement, making this her 38th and final season as Stanford head coach. This was also the team's final season in the Pac-12, as they moved to the Atlantic Coast Conference on August 1, 2024.

== Offseason ==
=== Departures ===
Name	Number	Pos.	Height	Year	Hometown	Reason for departure
Agnes Emma-Nnopu	2	G	5'11"	Junior	Ocean Grove, Australia	Transferred to TCU
Francesca Belibi	5	F	6'1"	Senior	Centennial, CO	Graduated
Ashten Prechtel	11	F	6'5"	Senior	Colorado Springs, CO	Graduated/2023 WNBA draft; selected 34th overall by Connecticut Sun
Indya Nivar	12	G	5'10"	Freshman	Apex, NC	Transferred to North Carolina
Haley Jones	30	G	6'1"	Senior	Santa Cruz, CA	Graduated/2023 WNBA draft; selected 6th overall by Atlanta Dream
Lauren Betts	51	C	6'7"	Freshman	Centennial, CO	Transferred to UCLA

=== Acquisitions ===
==== Recruiting ====
College recruiting information
Name	Hometown	School	Height	Weight	Commit date
Courtney Ogden; PG	Atlanta, Georgia	Westminster School	5 ft 11 in (1.80 m)	N/A	
Courtney Ogden; PG	Recruit ratings: ESPN: (96)				
Sunaja Agara; G	Minnetonka, MN	Hopkins High School	5 ft 11 in (1.80 m)	N/A	
Sunaja Agara; G	Recruit ratings: ESPN: (95)				
Chloe Clardy; G	Conway, AR	Conway High School	5 ft 9 in (1.75 m)	N/A	
Chloe Clardy; G	Recruit ratings: ESPN: (94)				
Overall recruit ranking:
Note: In many cases, Scout, Rivals, 247Sports, On3, and ESPN may conflict in their listings of height and weight.; In these cases, the average was taken. ESPN grades are on a 100-point scale.; Sources: "2023 Player Commits". ESPN. Archived from the original on December 6, 2021.

===== Recruiting class of 2024 =====
College recruiting information (2024)
Name	Hometown	School	Height	Weight	Commit date
Kennedy Ume; F	Owings Mills, MD	McDonogh School	6 ft 3 in (1.91 m)	N/A	
Kennedy Ume; F	Recruit ratings: ESPN: (94)				
Wrenwyck Ijiwoye; PG	Phoenix, AZ	Desert Vista High School	5 ft 6 in (1.68 m)	N/A	
Wrenwyck Ijiwoye; PG	Recruit ratings: ESPN: (94)				
Harper Peterson; F	Rocklin, CA	Whitney High School	6 ft 3 in (1.91 m)	N/A	
Harper Peterson; F	Recruit ratings: ESPN: (91)				
Overall recruit ranking:
Note: In many cases, Scout, Rivals, 247Sports, On3, and ESPN may conflict in their listings of height and weight.; In these cases, the average was taken. ESPN grades are on a 100-point scale.; Sources: "2024 Player Commits". ESPN. Archived from the original on November 19, 2023.

== Roster ==
2023–24 Stanford Cardinal women's basketball team
Players
Coaches

Pos.	#	Name	Height	Year	Previous school	Hometown
F	3	Nunu Agara	6 ft 2 in (1.88 m)	Fr	Hopkins	Minnetonka, MN
G	10	Talana Lepolo	5 ft 7 in (1.7 m)	So	Carondelet	Alameda, CA
G	13	Chloe Clardy	5 ft 9 in (1.75 m)	Fr	Conway	Conway, AR
G	20	Elena Bosgana	6 ft 2 in (1.88 m)	Jr	American Community	Athens, Greece
F	21	Brooke Demetre	6 ft 3 in (1.91 m)	Jr	Mater Dei	Foothill Ranch, CA
F	22	Cameron Brink	6 ft 4 in (1.93 m)	Sr	Mountainside	Beaverton, OR
G	24	Stavi Papadaki	5 ft 11 in (1.8 m)	So	2nd EPAL Chanion	Chania, Greece
G	31	Lauren Green	5 ft 8 in (1.73 m)	So	Castro Valley	Castro Valley, CA
G	32	Jzaniya Harriel	5 ft 10 in (1.78 m)	RS So	Antelope	Sacramento, CA
G	33	Hannah Jump	6 ft 0 in (1.83 m)	GS	Pinewood	San Jose, CA
F	40	Courtney Ogden	6 ft 1 in (1.85 m)	Fr	Westminster School	Atlanta, GA
F	44	Kiki Iriafen	6 ft 3 in (1.91 m)	Jr	Harvard-Westlake	Los Angeles, CA

Head coach

- Tara VanDerveer (Indiana)

Assistant coach(es)

- Kate Paye (Stanford)
- Katy Steding (Stanford)
- Tempie Brown (Michigan)
- Erica McCall (Stanford)

Legend

- (C) Team captain
- (S) Suspended
- (I) Ineligible
- (W) Walk-on
- Injured
- Current redshirt

Roster

== Schedule and results ==
Date time, TV	Rank^{#}	Opponent^{#}	Result	Record	High points	High rebounds	High assists	Site (attendance) city, state
Exhibition
November 1, 2023*; 7:00 p.m.	No. 15	Dominican	W 126–53		19 – Tied	14 – Iriafen	4 – Bosgana	Maples Pavilion (2,308); Stanford, CA
Regular season
November 8, 2023*; 7:00 p.m.	No. 15	Hawaii	W 87–40	1–0	23 – Iriafen	13 – Iriafen	5 – Brink	Maples Pavilion (2,535); Stanford, CA
November 12, 2023*; 2:00 p.m., ESPN	No. 15	No. 9 Indiana	W 96–64	2–0	20 – Tied	17 – Brink	4 – Lepolo	Maples Pavilion (3,678); Stanford, CA
November 16, 2023*; 7:00 p.m.	No. 6	Cal Poly	W 86–32	3–0	15 – Bosgana	11 – Demetre	4 – Lepolo	Maples Pavilion (2,554); Stanford, CA
November 19, 2023*; 12:00 p.m., ABC	No. 6	Duke	W 82–79 ^{OT}	4–0	29 – Brink	11 – Brink	4 – Agara	Maples Pavilion (4,236); Stanford, CA
November 22, 2023*; 1:30 p.m., FloSports	No. 4	vs. Belmont; Ball Dawgs Classic semifinals	W 74–55	5–0	27 – Brink	16 – Brink	4 – Ogden	Dollar Loan Center; Henderson, NV
November 24, 2023*; 6:30 p.m., FloSports	No. 4	vs. No. 13 Florida State; Ball Dawgs Classic championship	W 100–88	6–0	30 – Iriafen	17 – Iriafen	6 – Tied	Dollar Loan Center; Henderson, NV
November 26, 2023*; 1:00 p.m., P12N	No. 4	Albany	W 79–35	7–0	21 – Brink	19 – Brink	3 – Jump	Maples Pavilion (2,754); Stanford, CA
December 1, 2023*; 11:00 a.m., MW Network	No. 3	at San Diego State	W 85–44	8–0	25 – Brink	12 – Brink	4 – Clardy	Viejas Arena (3,708); San Diego, CA
December 3, 2023*; 1:00 p.m., ESPN+	No. 3	at Gonzaga	L 78–96	8–1	13 – Tied	7 – Iriafen	5 – Lepolo	McCarthey Athletic Center (6,000); Spokane, WA
December 15, 2023*; 7:00 p.m., P12N	No. 9	Portland	W 81–51	9–1	23 – Brink	15 – Brink	7 – Lepolo	Maples Pavilion (2,875); Stanford, CA
December 20, 2023*; 1:00 p.m.	No. 9	UC Davis	W 92–52	10–1	21 – Brink	11 – Iriafen	3 – Tied	Maples Pavilion (2,701); Stanford, CA
December 29, 2023; 2:00 p.m., P12N	No. 9	at California	W 78–51	11–1 (1–0)	20 – Lepolo	10 – Iriafen	6 – Lepolo	Haas Pavilion (4,197); Berkeley, CA
December 31, 2023*; 6:00 p.m.	No. 9	Morgan State	W 98–38	12–1	18 – Brink	8 – Tied	8 – Lepolo	Maples Pavilion (2,751); Stanford, CA
January 5, 2024; 7:00 p.m., P12N	No. 8	Washington State	W 74–65	13–1 (2–0)	20 – Brink	18 – Brink	4 – Tied	Maples Pavilion (3,084); Stanford, CA
January 7, 2024; 1:00 p.m., P12N	No. 8	Washington	W 71–59	14–1 (3–0)	19 – Iriafen	16 – Brink	5 – Lepolo	Maples Pavilion (3,924); Stanford, CA
January 12, 2024; 5:00 p.m., P12N	No. 8	at No. 19 Utah	W 66–64	15–1 (4–0)	25 – Iriafen	16 – Iriafen	7 – Lepolo	Jon M. Huntsman Center (5,608); Salt Lake City, UT
January 14, 2024; 11:00 a.m., P12N	No. 8	at No. 5 Colorado	L 59–71	15–2 (4–1)	19 – Iriafen	17 – Iriafen	5 – Lepolo	CU Events Center (9,111); Boulder, CO
January 19, 2024; 7:00 p.m., P12N	No. 8	Oregon	W 88–63	16–2 (5–1)	21 – Iriafen	15 – Iriafen	8 – Lepolo	Maples Pavilion (4,556); Stanford, CA
January 21, 2024; 2:00 p.m., P12N	No. 8	Oregon State	W 65–56	17–2 (6–1)	36 – Iriafen	12 – Iriafen	6 – Lepolo	Maples Pavilion (7,022); Stanford, CA
January 26, 2024; 5:00 p.m., P12N	No. 6	at Arizona State	W 80–50	18–2 (7–1)	27 – Iriafen	16 – Brink	7 – Lepolo	Desert Financial Arena (2,578); Tempe, AZ
January 28, 2024; 11:00 a.m., P12N	No. 6	at Arizona	W 96–64	19–2 (8–1)	25 – Brink	19 – Brink	6 – Lepolo	McKale Center (7,692); Tucson, AZ
February 2, 2024; 7:00 p.m., P12N	No. 4	No. 15 USC	L 58–67	19–3 (8–2)	19 – Brink	15 – Brink	3 – Tied	Maples Pavilion (5,371); Stanford, CA
February 4, 2024; 1:00 p.m., ESPN2	No. 4	No. 7 UCLA	W 80–60	20–3 (9–2)	19 – Brink	19 – Brink	7 – Lepolo	Maples Pavilion (7,207); Stanford, CA
February 9, 2024; 7:00 p.m., P12N	No. 6	at Washington	W 63–59 ^{OT}	21–3 (10–2)	22 – Brink	9 – Tied	4 – Brink	Alaska Airlines Arena (4,454); Seattle, WA
February 11, 2024; 1:00 p.m., P12N	No. 6	at Washington State	W 73–58	22–3 (11–2)	21 – Brink	14 – Iriafen	5 – Tied	Beasley Coliseum (1,304); Pullman, WA
February 16, 2024; 7:00 p.m., P12N	No. 3	California	W 84–49	23–3 (12–2)	23 – Iriafen	11 – Iriafen	4 – Ogden	Maples Pavilion (4,604); Stanford, CA
February 23, 2024; 7:00 p.m., P12N	No. 3	Arizona	L 61–68	23–4 (12–3)	21 – Iriafen	15 – Iriafen	4 – Iriafen	Maples Pavilion (4,423); Stanford, CA
February 25, 2024; 12:00 p.m., P12N	No. 3	Arizona State	W 81–67	24–4 (13–3)	22 – Iriafen	20 – Iriafen	7 – Brink	Maples Pavilion (4,271); Stanford, CA
February 29, 2024; 7:00 p.m., P12N	No. 4	at No. 11 Oregon State	W 67–63	25–4 (14–3)	25 – Brink	23 – Brink	4 – Tied	Gill Coliseum (7,867); Corvallis, OR
March 2, 2024; 2:00 p.m., P12N	No. 4	at Oregon	W 76–56	26–4 (15–3)	18 – Brink	17 – Brink	5 – Brink	Matthew Knight Arena (6,996); Eugene, OR
Pac-12 Women's Tournament
March 7, 2024; 2:30 p.m., P12N	(1) No. 2	vs. (8) California; Quarterfinals	W 71–57	27–4	28 – Iriafen	18 – Iriafen	5 – Iriafen	MGM Grand Garden Arena (4,883); Paradise, NV
March 8, 2024; 5:00 p.m., P12N	(1) No. 2	vs. (4) No. 13 Oregon State; Semifinals	W 66–57	28–4	20 – Jump	12 – Brink	9 – Brink	MGM Grand Garden Arena; Paradise, NV
March 10, 2024; 2:00 p.m., ESPN	(1) No. 2	vs. (2) No. 5 USC; Championship	L 61–74	28–5	19 – Brink	10 – Brink	4 – Jump	MGM Grand Garden Arena (5,526); Paradise, NV
NCAA Women's Tournament
March 22, 2024*; 7:00 p.m., ESPN2	(2 P4) No. 5	(15 P4) Norfolk State; First Round	W 79–50	29–5	18 – Bosgana	15 – Brink	4 – Tied	Maples Pavilion (4,537); Stanford, CA
March 24, 2024*; 7:00 p.m., ESPN	(2 P4) No. 5	(7 P4) Iowa State; Second Round	W 87–81 ^{OT}	30–5	41 – Iriafen	16 – Iriafen	7 – Lepolo	Maples Pavilion (5,811); Stanford, CA
March 29, 2024*; 4:30 p.m., ESPN	(2 P4) No. 5	vs. (3 P4) No. 11 NC State; Sweet Sixteen	L 67–77	30–6	26 – Iriafen	10 – Iriafen	6 – Lepolo	Moda Center; Portland, OR
*Non-conference game. ^{#}Rankings from AP poll. (#) Tournament seedings in parentheses. P4=Portland 4. All times are in PST.

== Rankings ==
Ranking movements Legend: ██ Increase in ranking ██ Decrease in ranking т = Tied with team above or below
	Week																				
Poll	Pre	1	2	3	4	5	6	7	8	9	10	11	12	13	14	15	16	17	18	19	Final
AP	15	6	4	3	9	9	9	9	8	8	8	6	4	6	3	3	4	2	4	5	9
Coaches	13	6	3	3	10	9	9	9	8	8	8	5т	3	6	3	3	5	2	5	5	8

== See also ==
- 2023–24 Stanford Cardinal men's basketball team
