= Angela Dugalić =

Serbian basketball player (born 2001)

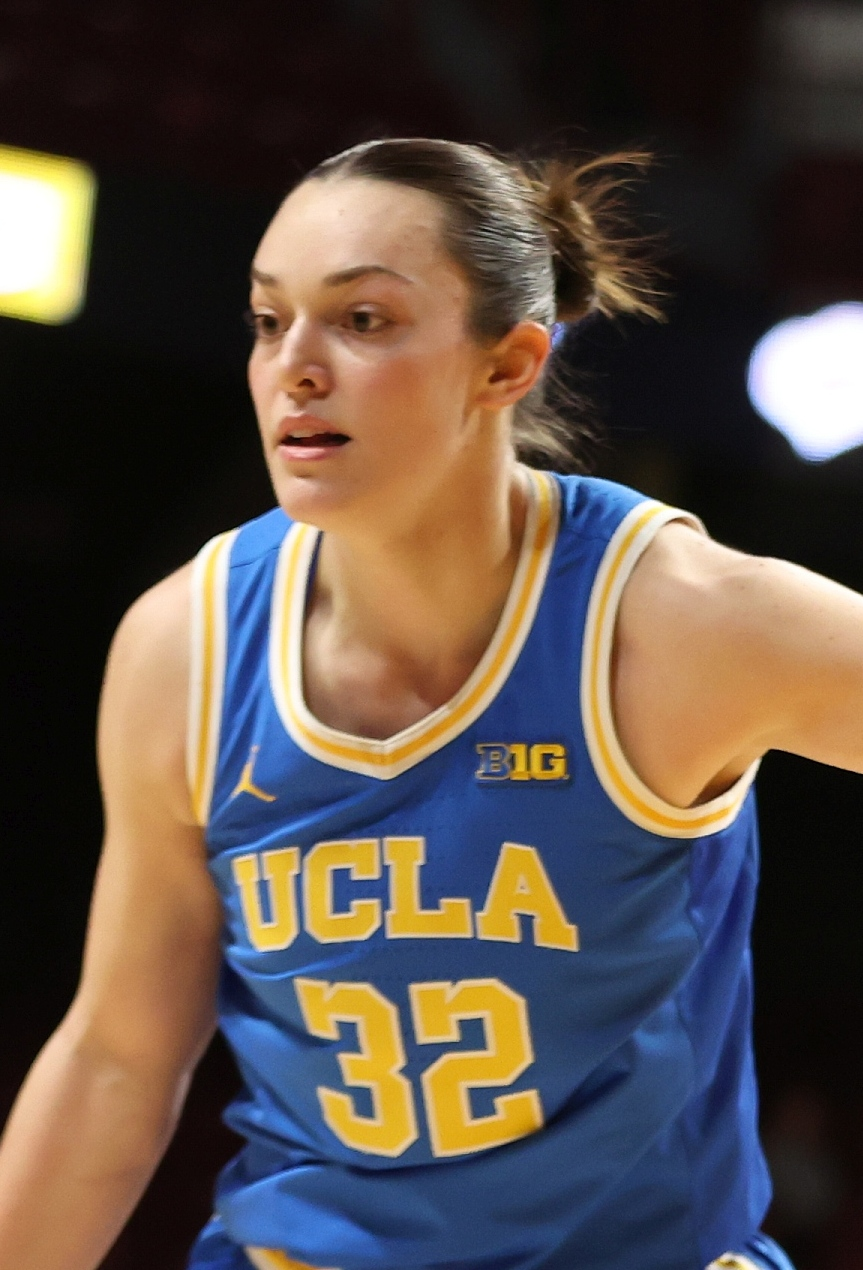
- Dugalić with UCLA in 2026

No. 32 – Crvena zvezda
- Position: Forward
- League: Basketball League of Serbia; EuroLeague Women

Personal information
- Born: 29 December 2001 (age 24) Des Plaines, Illinois, U.S.
- Listed height: 6 ft 4 in (1.93 m)
- Listed weight: 200 lb (91 kg)

Career information
- High school: Maine West (Des Plaines, Illinois)
- College: Oregon (2020–2021); UCLA (2021–2026)
- WNBA draft: 2026: 1st round, 9th overall pick
- Drafted by: Washington Mystics
- Playing career: 2026–present

Career history
- 2026–present: Washington Mystics
- 2026–present: Crvena zvezda

Career highlights
- NCAA champion (2026); Big Ten Sixth Player of the Year (2026); McDonald's All-American (2020); Illinois Miss Basketball (2020)
- Stats at Basketball Reference
Medals
Women's basketball
Representing Serbia
EuroBasket
Gold medal – first place	2021 France/Spain

Angela Dugalić (/ˈduːɡəˌlɪtʃ/ DOO-gə-LITCH; born 29 December 2001) is a Serbian-American professional basketball player for Crvena zvezda of the Basketball League of Serbia. She played college basketball for the Oregon Ducks and UCLA Bruins. Dugalić was named the Big Ten Sixth Player of the Year in 2026, when the Bruins won a national championship. She was drafted in the first round by the Washington Mystics and played for them in the 2026 WNBA season. She represents the Serbian national team internationally.

== High school career ==
Dugalić attended Maine West High School in Des Plaines, Illinois and played basketball for the Maine West warriors. In her sophomore year in 2018, the warriors finished in third place in the Illinois High School 4A tournament with a record of 31-2. In her junior year in 2019 the warriors went undefeated with a record of 35-0 and won the Illinois State 4A girl's basketball championship. In her senior year in 2020, the warriors went 30-4 and lost in the super-sectional round. In her senior year she averaged 20.6 points and 10.3 rebounds per game.

Dugalić was named Ms. Illinois Basketball by the Chicago Tribune in her senior year. She was named to the Illinois Basketball Coaches Associated 1st-Team 4A All-State In 2019 and 2020. She was the Illinois Gatorade player of the year in 2020.

Maine West celebrated Angela by retiring her number 32 on September 18, 2026. Her Washington Mystics teammates joined her, having just defeated the Chicago Sky the night before. It is the first retired number for a student-athlete at Maine West. She got the number 32 because "It was the biggest jersey they had." She has worn the number 32 at UCLA and for the Washington Mystics. She wore number 25 at Oregon as Sedona Prince had taken number 32 the previous year.

== College career ==
Dugalić played her first season of college basketball with the 2020–21 Oregon Ducks women's basketball team. She transferred to conference foe UCLA after that season. UCLA assistant Tasha Brown was one of the coaches recruiting Angela from high school. However, she did not debut for the Bruins until February 11, 2022, against Washington State, having suffered a preseason knee injury in October 2021 while the team was on a trip to play in a scrimmage against Texas. Dugalić also missed the entire 2022–23 season for UCLA due to injury, after tearing her ACL while playing for the Serbian national team at the FIBA World Cup. Angela was a starter for the 2023-24 season. She was a starter for the 2024–25 UCLA Bruins women's basketball team that advanced the Bruins to their first NCAA Final Four. She was the season leader with steals (50).

Dugalić was an important player for the 2025–26 UCLA Bruins women's basketball team that won the first NCAA championship at UCLA. With six senior starters available, Angela asked to come off the bench. Her selflessness was a key to winning the championship. In the game against Duke to advance to the final four, Angela came of the bench to score 16 points, six rebounds, four assists and two steals. She was named to the regional all-tournament team, along with teammate Lauren Betts, following the win over Duke to reach the Final Four. Dugalić was named Big Ten Conference Sixth Player of the Year (coaches and media)

== Professional career ==
On April 13, 2026, the Washington Mystics selected Dugalić as the ninth overall pick of the 2026 WNBA draft. She played alongside UCLA teammate and draftee Lauren Betts in the 2026 WNBA season.

On October 9, 2026, Dugalić signed for Crvena zvezda of the Basketball League of Serbia.

== National team career ==
Dugalić decided to represent the national team of her parents' homeland of Serbia.

In June 2021, Dugalić was a member of the Serbian national team that won the gold medal at the Eurobasket 2021 in Valencia, Spain.

== Career statistics ==
Legend
GP	Games played	GS	Games started	MPG	Minutes per game	RPG	Rebounds per game
APG	Assists per game	SPG	Steals per game	BPG	Blocks per game	PPG	Points per game
TO	Turnovers per game	FG%	Field-goal percentage	3P%	3-point field-goal percentage	FT%	Free-throw percentage
**Bold**	Career best	°	League leader

=== College ===
Year	Team	GP	GS	MPG	FG%	3P%	FT%	RPG	APG	SPG	BPG	TO	PPG
2020–21	Oregon	24	1	12.3	42.4	23.8	**83.3**	4.0	0.7	0.3	0.3	**0.8**	3.4
2021–22	UCLA	14	0	17.0	46.4	33.3	42.9	4.5	0.7	0.9	0.6	1.8	6.5
2022–23	UCLA	Did not play due to injury											
2023–24	UCLA	30	29	**23.8**	35.5	31.4	72.7	**6.5**	2.1	1.2	0.6	2.4	8.7
2024–25	UCLA	35	**34**	21.7	42.7	**34.8**	81.4	5.5	**2.4**	**1.4**	**0.8**	1.5	7.4
2025–26	UCLA	**38**	3	**23.8**	**50.2**	32.6	74.1	5.6	2.2	1.1	0.6	1.8	**9.0**
**Career**		141	67	20.6	43.0	32.2	72.0	5.4	1.8	1.0	0.6	1.7	7.3
Statistics retrieved from Sports-Reference.

== See also ==
- List of Serbian WNBA players
