= 2024 Southland Conference women's basketball tournament =

- Classification: Division I
- Season: 2023–24
- Teams: 8
- Site: The Legacy Center; Lake Charles, Louisiana
- Champions: Texas A&M–Corpus Christi (1st title)
- Winning coach: Royce Chadwick (7th title)
- MVP: Paige Allen (Texas A&M–Corpus Christi)
- Attendance: 700 (championship)
- Television: ESPN+, ESPNU

The 2024 Southland Conference women's basketball tournament is the postseason women's basketball championship for the Southland Conference. The tournament is taking place at The Legacy Center on the campus of McNeese State University in Lake Charles, Louisiana March 11–14, 2024. The Legacy Center will be the home of the tournament through 2029. The tournament winner will receive an automatic invitation to the 2024 NCAA Division I women's basketball tournament.

2023–24 Southland Conference women's basketball standings
	Conf.				Overall
Team	W		L	PCT	W		L	PCT
Lamar	17	–	1	.944	24	–	7	.774
Texas A&M–Corpus Christi †	14	–	4	.778	23	–	9	.719
Southeastern Louisiana	14	–	4	.778	19	–	12	.613
Incarnate Word	12	–	6	.667	19	–	11	.633
Texas A&M–Commerce*	8	–	10	.444	15	–	16	.484
New Orleans	8	–	10	.444	11	–	19	.367
Nicholls	7	–	11	.389	14	–	18	.438
Northwestern State	7	–	11	.389	11	–	19	.367
McNeese	2	–	16	.111	6	–	25	.194
Houston Christian	1	–	17	.056	6	–	23	.207
† 2024 Southland tournament winner * ineligible for the 2024 NCAA tournament due to transition from Division II.

== Seeds ==
Teams were seeded by record within the conference, with a tie-breaker system to seed teams with identical conference records. The top eight teams in the conference qualified for the tournament. The top two seeds received double byes into the semifinals in the merit-based format. The No. 3 and No. 4 seeds received single byes to the quarterfinals. Tiebreakers used were 1) Head-to-head results, 2) comparison of records against individual teams in the conference starting with the top-ranked team(s) and working down and 3) NCAA NET rankings available on the day following the conclusion of regular-season play.

Seed	School	Conference	Tiebreaker
1	Lamar	17–1	Not needed
2	Texas A&M–Corpus Christi	14–4	Split head-to-head vs SLU. Lost both games vs. Lamar. Won both games vs. UIW.
3	Southeastern Louisiana	14–4	Split head-to-head vs TAMUCC. Lost both games vs. Lamar. Split vs. UIW.
4	Incarnate Word	12–6	Not needed.
5	Texas A&M–Commerce	8–10	Split vs. New Orleans. Split vs. Lamar
6	New Orleans	8–10	Split vs. Texas A&M–Commerce. Lost both games vs. Lamar.
7	Nicholls	7–11	Split vs Northwestern State. Lost both games vs. Lamar. Split vs. TAMUCC
8	Northwestern State	7–11	Split vs Northwestern State. Lost both games vs. Lamar. Lost both games vs TAMUCC
DNQ	McNeese	2–16	
DNQ	Houston Christian	1–17	

== Schedule ==
Session	Game	Time*	Matchup^{#}	Score	Television
First round – Monday, March 11, 2024
1	1	11:00 am	No. 5 Texas A&M–Commerce vs. No. 8 Northwestern State	65–57	ESPN+
1	2	1:30 pm	No. 6 New Orleans vs. No. 7 Nicholls	66–73	ESPN+
Quarterfinals – Tuesday, March 12, 2024
2	3	11:00 am	No. 4 Incarnate Word vs. No. 5 Texas A&M–Commerce	57–66	ESPN+
2	4	1:30 pm	No. 3 Southeastern Louisiana vs. No. 7 Nicholls	75–57	ESPN+
Semifinals – Wednesday, March 13, 2024
3	5	11:00 am	No. 1 Lamar vs. No. 5 Texas A&M–Commerce	83–58	ESPN+
3	6	1:30 pm	No. 2 Texas A&M–Corpus Christi vs. No. 3 Southeastern Louisiana	60–59	ESPN+
Championship – Thursday, March 14, 2024
4	7	4:00 pm	No. 1 Lamar vs. No. 2 Texas A&M–Corpus Christi	61–68	ESPNU
*Game times in CDT. #-Rankings denote tournament seeding.

== Bracket ==
First round Monday, March 11; ESPN+
5	Texas A&M–Commerce	65
8	Northwestern State	57
6	New Orleans	66
7	Nicholls	73

Second round Tuesday, March 12; ESPN+
4	Incarnate Word	57
5	Texas A&M–Commerce	66
3	Southeastern Louisiana	75
7	Nicholls	57

Semifinals; Wednesday, March 13; ESPN+
1	Lamar	83
5	Texas A&M–Commerce	58
2	Texas A&M–Corpus Christi	60
3	Southeastern Louisiana	59

Championship; Thursday, March 14; ESPNU
1	Lamar	61
2	Texas A&M–Corpus Christi	68

* denotes number of overtime periods

=== First round ===
ESPN+

March 11
11:00 am

report

No. 5 Texas A&M–Commerce 65, No. 8 Northwestern State 57
Scoring by quarter: 15–9, 10–9, 16–22, 24–17
Pts: M. Deck – 20; Rebs: J. Beaty – 12; Asts: Tied (M. Deck & J. Newsome) – 3	Pts: J. Woodson – 17; Rebs: S. Ayres – 12; Asts: J. Woodson – 4

The Legacy Center – Lake Charles, LA
Referees: Simona Sandoval, Jennifer White, Chaney Muench

ESPN+

March 11
1:30 pm

Report

No. 6 New Orleans 66, No. 7 Nicholls 73
Scoring by quarter: 15–14, 16–14, 17–25, 18–20
Pts: N. Francois – 22; Rebs: N. Francois – 11; Asts: Tied (I. Williams & A. Calderon) – 3	Pts: M. Etienne N. – 19; Rebs: L. Alexander – 10; Asts: K. Hamilton – 7

The Legacy Center – Lake Charles, LA
Referees: Tiffany Bridges, John Fletcher, Travis Jones

=== Second round ===
ESPN+

March 12
11:00 am

Report

No. 3 Southeastern Louisiana 75, No. 7 Nicholls 57
Scoring by quarter: 21–13, 15–17, 25–12, 14–15
Pts: K. Paul – 18; Rebs: K. Paul – 10; Asts: H. Giaratano – 5	Pts: L. Alexander – 14; Rebs: K. Hamilton – 9 Asts: K. Hamilton – 5

The Legacy Center – Lake Charles, LA
Referees: Chaney Muench, Britton Sherry, Demoya Pugh

ESPN+

March 12
1:30 pm

Report

No. 4 Incarnate Word 57, No. 5 Texas A&M–Commerce 66
Scoring by quarter: 14–15, 13–16, 16–20, 14–15
Pts: N. De Leon Negron – 14; Rebs: Tied (N. De Leon Negron & J. Elliott) – 9 Asts: Tied (N. De Leon Negron & A. Collins) – 3	Pts: M. Deck – 22; Rebs: J. Beaty – 11; Asts: Tied (M. Deck & J. Hood) – 2

The Legacy Center – Lake Charles, LA
Referees: Travis Jones, Kelly Johnson, Jaclyn Watson

=== Semifinals ===
ESPN+

March 13
11:00 am

Report

No. 1 Lamar 83, No. 5 Texas A&M–Commerce 58
Scoring by quarter: 11–15, 23–16, 26–18, 23–9
Pts: A. Davis – 23; Rebs: S. Dean – 13; Asts: Tied (R. Taylor & N. Weems) – 3	Pts: J. Newsome – 18; Rebs: Tied (3 players) – 4 Asts: A. Boyce – 4

The Legacy Center – Lake Charles, LA
Referees: Jennifer White, Tiffany Bridges, Britton Sherry

ESPN+

March 13
1:30 pm

Report

No. 2 Texas A&M–Corpus Christi 60, No. 3 Southeastern Louisiana 59
Scoring by quarter: 11–21, 17–11, 18–9, 14–18
Pts: M. Aguado – 16; Rebs: A. Westbrook – 10; Asts: Tied (A. Westbrook & V. Verano) – 3	Pts: H. Giaratano – 11; Rebs: Tied (H. Giaratano & T. Bell) – 8 Asts: J. Pierre – 7

The Legacy Center – Lake Charles, LA
Referees: Jaclyn Watson, D'Lynn Schertz, Travis Jones

=== Championship ===
ESPNU

March 14
4:00 pm

Report

No. 1 Lamar 61, No. 2 Texas A&M–Corpus Christi 68
Scoring by quarter: 12–17, 11–14, 13–17, 25–20
Pts: S. Dean – 19; Rebs: A. Davis – 11; Asts: B. Mitchell – 6	Pts: P. Allen – 22; Rebs: P. Allen – 12; Asts: V. Verano – 6

The Legacy Center – Lake Charles, LA
Attendance: 700
Referees: Chaney Muench, Demoya Pugh, Kelly Johnson

== Awards and honors ==
2024 Southland Conference Women's Basketball All-Tournament Team
- Paige Allen, Texas A&M–Corpus Christi (MVP)
- Alecia Westbrook, Texas A&M–Corpus Christi
- Akasha Davis, Lamar
- Sabria Dean, Lamar

== See also ==
- 2024 Southland Conference men's basketball tournament
- Southland Conference women's basketball tournament
