= 2023–24 New Orleans Privateers women's basketball team =

Intercollegiate basketball season

2023–24 New Orleans Privateers women's basketball
- Conference: Southland Conference
- Record: 11–19 (8–10 Southland)
- Head coach: Trelanne Powell (1st season)
- Assistant coaches: Brittany White; Lonnika Thompson; Kate Zhibareva
- Home arena: Lakefront Arena

2023–24 Southland Conference women's basketball standings
	Conf.				Overall
Team	W		L	PCT	W		L	PCT
Lamar	17	–	1	.944	24	–	7	.774
Texas A&M–Corpus Christi †	14	–	4	.778	23	–	9	.719
Southeastern Louisiana	14	–	4	.778	19	–	12	.613
Incarnate Word	12	–	6	.667	19	–	11	.633
Texas A&M–Commerce*	8	–	10	.444	15	–	16	.484
New Orleans	8	–	10	.444	11	–	19	.367
Nicholls	7	–	11	.389	14	–	18	.438
Northwestern State	7	–	11	.389	11	–	19	.367
McNeese	2	–	16	.111	6	–	25	.194
Houston Christian	1	–	17	.056	6	–	23	.207
† 2024 Southland tournament winner * ineligible for the 2024 NCAA tournament due to transition from Division II.

The 2023–24 New Orleans Privateers women's basketball team represented the University of New Orleans (UNO) during the 2023–24 NCAA Division I women's basketball season. The Privateers were led by first-year head coach Trelanne Powell and played their home games at the Lakefront Arena located on the UNO campus in New Orleans, Louisiana. They were members of the Southland Conference (SLC). The Privateers compiled an 11–19 overall record and an 8–10 record in conference play. Their season ended with a 66–73 loss to Nicholls in the first round of the SLC tournament.

== Media ==
Home games were broadcast on ESPN+.

== Preseason polls ==
=== Southland Conference Poll ===
The Southland Conference released its preseason poll on October 10, 2023. Receiving 56 overall votes, the Privateers were picked to finish ninth in the conference.

Predicted finish	Team	Votes (1st place)
1	Southeastern Louisiana	159 (15)
2	Texas A&M–Corpus Christi	140 (3)
3	Lamar	132 (2)
4	Incarnate Word	97
T5	Houston Christian	74
T5	McNeese	74
7	Northwestern State	65
8	Texas A&M–Commerce	58
9	New Orleans	56
10	Nicholls	39

=== Preseason All Conference ===
Graduate student DeArica Pryor, a guard, was selected to the Preseason All Conference first team.

== Roster ==
2023–24 New Orleans Privateers women's basketball team
Players
Coaches

Pos.	#	Name	Height	Year	Hometown
C	00	Nora Francois	6 ft 2 in (1.88 m)	Jr	Minneapolis, MN
G	1	Evangelia Davlakou	5 ft 5 in (1.65 m)	So	Athens, Greece
G	4	Kristen Crenshaw-Gill	5 ft 9 in (1.75 m)	Jr	Youngstown, OH
G	5	Alexis Calderon	5 ft 4 in (1.63 m)	Jr	Jacksonville, TX
F	10	Nahja Scott	6 ft 1 in (1.85 m)	Sr	Shreveport, LA
G	11	Imani Williams	5 ft 8 in (1.73 m)	So	Hopkins, SC
G	14	Kyla Davis	5 ft 9 in (1.75 m)	Jr	Fort Worth, TX
G	20	Justice Ross	6 ft 0 in (1.83 m)	RS Sr	Des Moines, IA
G	23	DeArica Pryor	5 ft 7 in (1.7 m)	GS	Urbandale, IA
G	24	Yaly Ben Harush	5 ft 8 in (1.73 m)	Fr	Elitzur Holon, Israel
F	31	Zoe Cooper	5 ft 11 in (1.8 m)	Jr	Birmingham, AL
G	32	Brianna Ellis	5 ft 8 in (1.73 m)	Jr	Palm Coast, FL
G	33	Jayla Kimbrough	5 ft 9 in (1.75 m)	RS So	Decatur, GA
F/C	34	Patricia Sherrill	6 ft 1 in (1.85 m)	Jr	Alexandria, VA

Head coach

- Trelanne Powell (Hiwassee College / Columbus State)

Assistant coach(es)

- Brittany White (Delta State / Augusta
- Lonnika Wilson (Trinity Valley CC / Florida)
- Kate Zhibareva (New Mexico Junior College / Marshall / East Texas A&M)

Legend

- (C) Team captain
- (S) Suspended
- (I) Ineligible
- (W) Walk-on
- Injured
- Current redshirt

Roster
Last update: October 26, 2023

== Schedule ==
Date time, TV	Rank^{#}	Opponent^{#}	Result	Record	High points	High rebounds	High assists	Site (attendance) city, state
Non-conference regular season
November 8, 2023*; 11:00 a.m., ESPN+		at Oklahoma State	L 66–74	0–1	23 – D. Pryor	7 – Z. Cooper	3 – D. Pryor	Gallagher-Iba Arena (3,204); Stillwater, OK
November 10, 2023*; 11:00 a.m., ESPN+		at Tulsa	L 61–86	0–2	17 – D. Pryor	9 – B. Ellis	2 – A. Calderon	Reynolds Center (2,256); Tulsa, OK
November 15, 2023*; 11:00 a.m., SECN+		at Mississippi State	L 26–87	0–3	7 – J. Kimbrough	4 – D. Pryor	2 – A. Calderon	Humphrey Coliseum (6,427); Starkville, MS
November 21, 2023*; 6:30 p.m., ESPN+		Alcorn State	W 53–42	1–3	14 – A. Calderon	6 – A. Calderon	4 – A. Calderon	Lakefront Arena (493); New Orleans, LA
November 26, 2023*; 2:00 p.m., ESPN+		at Houston	L 54–81	1–4	13 – Ross	7 – Ross	4 – Pryor	Fertitta Center (1,139); Houston, TX
November 29, 2023*; 7:00 p.m., ESPN+		at South Alabama	L 63–80	1–5	19 – Kimbrough	9 – Cooper	1 – Pryor	Mitchell Center (380); Mobile, AL
December 2, 2023*; 2:00 p.m., ESPN+		Louisiana	L 41–44	1–6	9 – A. Calderon	8 – N. Francois	2 – J. Kimbrough	Lakefront Arena (573); New Orleans, LA
December 6, 2023*; 6:00 p.m., ESPN+		at Tulane	L 63–90	1–7	18 – D. Pryor	5 – Z. Cooper	3 – D. Pryor	Devlin Fieldhouse (1,026); New Orleans, LA
December 11, 2023*; 10:00 a.m., ESPN+		at UCF	L 45–72	1–8	11 – A. Calderon	5 – J. Ross	2 – tied	UCF Arena (1,238); Orlando, FL
December 18, 2023*; 11:00 a.m., ESPN+		Tarleton State	W 67–59	2–8	16 – D. Pryor	7 – D. Pryor	7 – A. Calderon	Lakefront Arena (877); New Orleans, LA
December 20, 2023*; 12:00 p.m.		at Alcorn State	W 83–59	3–8	22 – D. Pryor	8 – A. Calderon	5 – J. Ross	Davey Whitney Complex (35); Lorman, MS
Southland regular season
January 4, 2024; 6:30 p.m., ESPN+		Texas A&M–Commerce	W 88–78	4–8 (1–0)	24 – B. Ellis	9 – B. Ellis	6 – B. Ellis	Lakefront Arena (521); New Orleans, LA
January 6, 2024; 2:00 p.m., ESPN+		Southeastern Louisiana	L 44–57	4–9 (1–1)	18 – J. Kimbrough	7 – J. Kimbrough	3 – A. Calderon	Lakefront Arena (603); New Orleans, LA
January 11, 2024; 6:30 p.m., ESPN+		at Nicholls	W 69–63	5–9 (2–1)	21 – D. Pryor	8 – Z. Cooper	5 – B. Ellis	Stopher Gymnasium (376); Thibodaux, LA
January 13, 2024; 2:00 p.m., ESPN+		Texas A&M–Corpus Christi	L 54–61	5–10 (2–2)	13 – D. Pryor	7 – B. Ellis	3 – B. Ellis	Lakefront Arena (492); New Orleans, LA
January 18, 2024; 6:00 p.m., ESPN+		at Houston Christian	W 57–48	6–10 (3–2)	16 – Z. Cooper	8 – A. Calderon	2 – Z. Cooper	Sharp Gymnasium (250); Houston, TX
January 20, 2024; 2:00 p.m., ESPN+		Northwestern State	L 43–72	6–11 (3–3)	18 – N. Scott	7 – D. Pryor	1 – tied (3)	Lakefront Arena (488); New Orleans, LA
January 25, 2024; 7:00 p.m., ESPN+		at Lamar	L 62–65	6–12 (3–4)	15 – A. Calderon	6 – N. Francois	6 – J. Ross	Neches Arena; Beaumont, TX
January 27, 2024; 1:00 p.m., ESPN+		at McNeese	W 74–59	7–12 (4–4)	22 – N. Francios	9 – Z. Cooper	6 – J. Ross	The Legacy Center (1,340); Lake Charles, LA
February 1, 2024; 6:30 p.m., ESPN+		Houston Christian	W 71–61	8–12 (5–4)	22 – C. Pryor	9 – Z. Cooper	6 – A. Calderon	Lakefront Arena (375); New Orleans, LA
February 3, 2024; 2:00 p.m., ESPN+		Incarnate Word	L 54–64	8–13 (5–5)	15 – N. Francois	11 – N. Francois	2 – B. Ellis	Lakefront Arena (440); New Orleans, LA
February 8, 2024; 6:30 p.m., ESPN+		at Northwestern State	W 80–57	9–13 (6–5)	25 – J. Kimbrough	9 – J. Kimbrough	4 – D. Pryor	Prather Coliseum (784); Natchitoches, LA
February 10, 2024; 3:30 p.m., ESPN+		at Texas A&M–Commerce	L 63–67 ^{OT}	9–14 (6–6)	32 – D. Pryor	13 – D. Pryor	3 – D. Pryor	The Field House; Commerce, TX
February 15, 2024; 6:30 p.m., ESPN+		Nicholls	W 80–78	10–14 (7–6)	20 – N. Francois	10 – N. Francois	6 – A. Calderon	Lakefront Arena (454); New Orleans, LA
February 17, 2024; 2:00 p.m., ESPN+		Lamar	L 60–63	10–15 (7–7)	22 – D. Pryor	10 – N. Francois	2 – A. Calderon	Lakefront Arena (588); New Orleans, LA
February 24, 2024; 1:00 p.m., ESPN+		at Southeastern Louisiana	L 66–69 ^{OT}	10–16 (7–8)	30 – N. Francois	13 – N. Francois	4 – A. Calderon	Pride Roofing University Center (783); Hammond, LA
February 29, 2024; 7:00 p.m., ESPN+		at Texas A&M–Corpus Christi	L 54–81	10–17 (7–9)	12 – A. Calderon	6 – N. Francois	4 – D. Pryor	American Bank Center (851); Corpus Christi, TX
March 2, 2024; 2:00 p.m., ESPN+		at Incarnate Word	L 76–79 ^{OT}	10–18 (7–10)	20 – D. Pryor	10 – N. Francois	4 – D. Pryor	McDermott Center (319); San Antonio, TX
March 6, 2024; 5:30 p.m., ESPN+		McNeese	W 67–64	11–18 (8–10)	23 – D. Pryor	9 – N. Francois	6 – A. Calderon	Lakefront Arena (543); New Orleans, LA
2024 Jersey Mike's Subs Southland Conference tournament
March 11, 2024; 1:30 p.m., ESPN+	(6)	vs. (7) Nicholls; First round	L 66–73	11–19	22 – N. Francois	11 – N. Francois	3 – A. Calderon	The Legacy Center; Lake Charles, LA
*Non-conference game. ^{#}Rankings from AP poll. (#) Tournament seedings in parentheses. All times are in Central.

== Conference awards and honors ==
=== Weekly awards ===
Weekly honors
Honors	Player	Position	Date awarded	Ref.
SLC Women's Basketball Player of the Week	DeArica Pryor	G	January 2, 2024	
SLC Women's Basketball Player of the Week	DeArica Pryor	G	February 12, 2024	

== See also ==
- 2023–24 New Orleans Privateers men's basketball team
