= 2023–24 Southeastern Louisiana Lady Lions basketball team =

Intercollegiate basketball season

2023–24 Southeastern Louisiana Lady Lions basketball
- Conference: Southland Conference
- Record: 19–12 (14–4 Southland)
- Head coach: Ayla Guzzardo (7th season)
- Assistant coaches: Kenneth Lee Jr.; Ronneka Robertson; Aja Ochie
- Home arena: Pride Roofing University Center

2023–24 Southland Conference women's basketball standings
	Conf.				Overall
Team	W		L	PCT	W		L	PCT
Lamar	17	–	1	.944	24	–	7	.774
Texas A&M–Corpus Christi †	14	–	4	.778	23	–	9	.719
Southeastern Louisiana	14	–	4	.778	19	–	12	.613
Incarnate Word	12	–	6	.667	19	–	11	.633
Texas A&M–Commerce*	8	–	10	.444	15	–	16	.484
New Orleans	8	–	10	.444	11	–	19	.367
Nicholls	7	–	11	.389	14	–	18	.438
Northwestern State	7	–	11	.389	11	–	19	.367
McNeese	2	–	16	.111	6	–	25	.194
Houston Christian	1	–	17	.056	6	–	23	.207
† 2024 Southland tournament winner * ineligible for the 2024 NCAA tournament due to transition from Division II.

The 2023–24 Southeastern Louisiana Lady Lions basketball team represented Southeastern Louisiana University in the 2023–24 NCAA Division I women's basketball season. The Lady Lions were led by seventh-year head coach Ayla Guzzardo, and played their home games at Pride Roofing University Center in Hammond, Louisiana as members of the Southland Conference. They compiled a 19–12 overall season record and a 14–4 record in conference play. Their season ended with a 59–60 loss to Texas A&M–Corpus Christi in the SLC tournament semifinals round.

== Previous season ==
The Lady Lions finished the 2022–23 season 21–10 overall, 14–4 in Southland play, to finish in first place. With a first-round bye, they defeated Texas A&M–Commerce in the semifinals of the Southland women's tournament. They defeated Lamar in the tournament championship game, winning the conference auto-bid to the 2023 NCAA Division I women's basketball tournament. Their season ended when they were defeated by No. 3 Iowa in the first round.

== Media ==
Home games were broadcast on ESPN+.

== Preseason polls ==
=== Southland Conference poll ===
The Southland Conference released its preseason poll on October 10, 2023. Receiving 159 overall votes and 15 first-place votes, the Lady Lions were picked to finish first in the conference.

Predicted finish	Team	Votes (1st place)
1	Southeastern Louisiana	159 (15)
2	Texas A&M–Corpus Christi	140 (3)
3	Lamar	132 (2)
4	Incarnate Word	97
T5	Houston Christian	74
T5	McNeese	74
7	Northwestern State	65
8	Texas A&M–Commerce	58
9	New Orleans	56
10	Nicholls	39

=== Preseason All Conference ===
Senior guards Alexius Horne and Hailey Giaratano were selected to the Preseason All-Conference first team.

== Roster ==
2023–24 Southeastern Louisiana Lions women's basketball team
Players
Coaches

Pos.	#	Name	Height	Year	Previous school	Hometown
F	0	Kennedy Paul	6 ft 1 in (1.85 m)	GS	University Lab; Prairie View A&M	Brusly, LA
G	1	Jalencia Pierre	5 ft 5 in (1.65 m)	So	Amite HS	Springfield, LA
G	2	Arianna Patton	5 ft 5 in (1.65 m)	Jr	Meridian HS; Jones College	Meridian, MS
G	3	Allasia Washington	5 ft 8 in (1.73 m)	So	Madison Prep Academy	Baton Rouge, LA
G	4	Demi Gentry	5 ft 11 in (1.8 m)	Fr	White Station HS	Memphis, TN
G	5	Taylor Bell	5 ft 11 in (1.8 m)	Jr	Huntington HS	Shreveport, LA
G	10	Breyionce George	5 ft 7 in (1.7 m)	So	Lafayette HS; Delgado CC	Lafayette, LA
G	11	Avari Berry	5 ft 6 in (1.68 m)	Fr	Pflugerville HS	Austin, TX
F	12	Terri Crawford	6 ft 1 in (1.85 m)	Jr	Ramsay HS; Central Arkansas	Birmingham, AL
G	15	Daija Harvey	5 ft 9 in (1.75 m)	Sr	Donaldsonville HS	Donaldsonville, LA
G	23	Mackenzie Thomas	5 ft 8 in (1.73 m)	RS Jr	Laurel HS; Jones College	Laurel, MS
G	24	Dijone' Flowers	5 ft 7 in (1.7 m)	Jr	Live Oak HS; Lamar	Denham Springs, LA
F	30	Cheyanne Daniels	6 ft 3 in (1.91 m)	Jr	Miami Senior HS; Shawnee CC	Miami, FL
G	31	Alexius Horne	5 ft 9 in (1.75 m)	Sr	Denham Springs HS	Baton Rouge, LA
G	55	Hailey Giaratano	5 ft 10 in (1.78 m)	Sr	Ponchatoula HS	Ponchatoula, LA

Head coach

- Ayla Guzzardo (Akron)

Assistant coach(es)

- Kenneth Lee Jr. (Nicholls State)
- Aja Ochie (Southeastern Louisiana)
- Ronneka Robertson (South Alabama)

Legend

- (C) Team captain
- (S) Suspended
- (I) Ineligible
- (W) Walk-on
- Injured
- Current redshirt

Roster
Last update: October 16, 2024

== Schedule and results ==
Date time, TV	Rank^{#}	Opponent^{#}	Result	Record	High points	High rebounds	High assists	Site (attendance) city, state
Non-conference regular season
November 6, 2023*; 11:00 a.m., ESPN+		Millsaps	W 61–30	1–0	22 – C. Daniels	10 – C. Daniels	5 – H. Giaratano	Pride Roofing University Center (2,107); Hammond, LA
November 10, 2023*; 6:30 p.m., SECN+		at No. 25 Mississippi State	L 46–67	1–1	11 – K. Paul	8 – H. Giaratono	3 – C. Daniels	Humphrey Coliseum (4,531); Starkville, MS
November 14, 2023*; 6:00 p.m., ESPN+		SUNO	W 90–30	2–1	17 – A. Berry	5 – A. Berry	6 – H. Giaratano	Pride Roofing University Center (921); Hammond, LA
November 17, 2023; 7:00 p.m., ESPN+		No. 7 LSU	L 50–73	2–2	12 – K. Paul	6 – K. Paul	4 – A. Berry	Pride Roofing University Center (7,500); Hammond, LA
November 20, 2023*; 7:00 p.m., ESPN+		Jackson State	L 54–63	2–3	13 – H. Giaratano	5 – C. Daniels	3 – H. Giaratano	Pride Roofing University Center (712); Hammond, LA
November 25, 2023*; 1:00 p.m., ESPN+		Mobile	W 75–47	3–3	20 – C. Daniels	9 – T. Bell	7 – H. Giaratano	Pride Roofing University Center (721); Hammond, LA
November 28, 2023*; 6:00 p.m., ESPN+		at Wichita State	W 64–36	4–3	15 – H. Giaratano	8 – T. Bell	4 – A. Berry	Charles Koch Arena (1,200); Wichita, KS
November 30, 2023*; 6:30 p.m., BIG12/ESPN+		at Kansas	L 56–67	4–4	16 – Giaratano	6 – Bell	2 – Giaratano	Allen Fieldhouse (2,483); Lawrence, KS
December 15, 2023*; 6:00 p.m., ESPN+		South Alabama	L 60–67	4–5	19 – Giaratano	6 – Thomas	3 – Giaratano	Pride Roofing University Center (629); Hammond, LA
December 19, 2023*; 11:30 p.m.		vs. Oregon State; 2023–24 Maui Tournament	L 69–92	4–6	24 – H. Giaratano	7 – T. Bell	2 – T. Bell	Seabury Hall (882); Makawao, HI
December 20, 2023*; 10:00 p.m.		vs. Tulsa; 2023–24 Maui Tournament	L 47–48	4–7	15 – T. Bell	13 – C. Daniels	3 – J. Pierre	Seabury Hall; Makawao, HI
Southland Conference regular season
January 4, 2024; 6:30 p.m., ESPN+		at Nicholls	W 66–56	5–7 (1–0)	20 – C. Daniels	8 – C. Daniels	8 – J. Pierre	Stopher Gymnasium (433); Thibodaux, LA
January 6, 2024; 2:00 p.m., ESPN+		at New Orleans	W 57–44	6–7 (2–0)	12 – A. Patton	9 – K. Paul	4 – H. Giaratano	Lakefront Arena (603); New Orleans, LA
January 11, 2024; 6:00 p.m., ESPN+		Texas A&M–Corpus Christi	W 61–58	7–7 (3–0)	13 – J. Pierre	9 – H. Giaratano	3 – J. Pierre	Pride Roofing University Center (692); Hammond, LA
January 13, 2024; 1:00 p.m., ESPN+		at McNeese	W 77–63 ^{OT}	8–7 (4–0)	21 – J. Pierre	8 – C. Daniels	5 – J. Pierre	The Legacy Center (2,208); Lake Charles, LA
January 18, 2024; 6:00 p.m., ESPN+		Northwestern State	W 55–48	9–7 (5–0)	23 – H. Giaratano	6 – H. Giaratano	2 – J. Pierre	Pride Roofing University Center (1,012); Hammond, LA
January 20, 2024; 1:00 p.m., ESPN+		Texas A&M–Commerce	W 65–49	10–7 (6–0)	15 – J. Pierre	8 – K. Paul	4 – T. Bell	Pride Roofing University Center (721); Hammond, LA
January 25, 2024; 6:00 p.m., ESPN+		at Houston Christian	W 53–51	11–7 (7–0)	14 – tied (2)	10 – M. Thomas	4 – H. Giaratano	Sharp Gymnasium (200); Houston, TX
January 27, 2024; 3:00 p.m., ESPN+		at Lamar	L 45–59	11–8 (7–1)	8 – H. Giaratano	5 – H. Giaratano	5 – H. Giaratano	Neches Arena (985); Beaumont, TX
February 1, 2024; 6:00 p.m., ESPN+		Incarnate Word	W 93–86 ^{OT}	12–8 (8–1)	27 – H. Giaratano	9 – C. Daniels	4 – A. Patton	Pride Roofing University Center (1,248); Hammond, LA
February 3, 2024; 1:00 p.m., ESPN+		McNeese	W 80–69	13–8 (9–1)	20 – T. Bell	8 – T. Bell	6 – J. Pierce	Pride Roofing University Center (705); Hammond, LA
February 8, 2024; 6:30 p.m., ESPN+		at Texas A&M–Commerce	W 72–61	14–8 (10–1)	12 – J. Pierre	10 – C. Daniels	3 – T. Bell	The Field House (313); Commerce, TX
February 10, 2024; 1:00 p.m., ESPN+		at Northwestern State	W 59–51	15–8 (11–1)	14 – T. Bell	12 – C. Daniels	4 – J. Pierre	Prather Coliseum (803); Natchitoches, LA
February 15, 2024; 6:00 p.m., ESPN+		Lamar	L 60–67	15–9 (11–2)	17 – H. Giaratano	6 – J. Pierce	3 – J. Pierce	Pride Roofing University Center (953); Hammond, LA
February 17, 2024; 1:00 p.m., ESPN+		Houston Christian	W 60–40	16–9 (12–2)	22 – K. Paul	6 – M. Thomas	4; – J. Pierre	Pride Roofing University Center (644); Hammond, LA
February 24, 2024; 1:00 p.m., ESPN+		New Orleans	W 69–66 ^{OT}	17–9 (13–2)	17 – A. Washington	7 – C. Daniels	5 – H. Giaratano	Pride Roofing University Center (783); Hammond, LA
February 29, 2024; 6:30 p.m., ESPN+		at Incarnate Word	L 51–53	17–10 (13–3)	– T. Bell	– T. Bell	4 – H. Giaratano	McDermott Center (169); San Antonio, TX
March 2, 2024; 1:00 p.m., ESPN+		at Texas A&M–Corpus Christi	L 73–79 ^{OT}	17–11 (13–4)	15 – H. Giaratano	7 – T. Bell	4 – D. Flowers	American Bank Center (1,352); Corpus Christi, TX
March 7, 2024; 4:30 p.m., ESPN+		Nicholls	W 68–62	18–11 (14–4)	25 – H. Giaratano	7 – H. Giaratano	4 – H. Giaratano	Pride Roofing University Center (779); Hammond, LA
2024 Jersey Mike's Subs Southland Conference tournament
March 12, 2024; 1:30 p.m., ESPN+	(3)	vs. (7) Nicholls; Second round	W 75–57	19–11	18 – K. Paul	10 – K. Paul	5 – H. Giaratano	The Legacy Center; Lake Charles, LA
March 13, 2024; 1:30 p.m., ESPN+	(3)	vs. (2) Texas A&M–Corpus Christi; Semifinals	L 59–60	19–12	11 – H. Giaratano	8 – tied (H. Giaratano & T. Bell)	7 – J. Pierre	The Legacy Center; Lake Charles, LA
*Non-conference game. ^{#}Rankings from AP poll. (#) Tournament seedings in parentheses. All times are in Central.

== Conference awards and honors ==
=== Weekly awards ===
Weekly honors
Honors	Player	Position	Date awarded	Ref.
SLC Women's Basketball Player of the Week	Jalencia Pierre	G	January 15, 2024	
SLC Women's Basketball Player of the Week	Hailey Giaratano	G	February 5, 2024	

== See also ==
- 2023–24 Southeastern Louisiana Lions basketball team
