= 2023–24 Lamar Lady Cardinals basketball team =

Intercollegiate basketball season

2023–24 Lamar Lady Cardinals basketball

Southland Conference regular season champions

WBIT, First Round
- Conference: Southland Conference
- Record: 24–7 (17–1 SLC)
- Head coach: Aqua Franklin (5th season)
- Assistant coaches: Bianca Smith (3rd season); Raymond Patche (2nd season); Omar Sneed (2nd season)
- Home arena: Montagne Center (Capacity: 10,080)

2023–24 Southland Conference women's basketball standings
	Conf.				Overall
Team	W		L	PCT	W		L	PCT
Lamar	17	–	1	.944	24	–	7	.774
Texas A&M–Corpus Christi †	14	–	4	.778	23	–	9	.719
Southeastern Louisiana	14	–	4	.778	19	–	12	.613
Incarnate Word	12	–	6	.667	19	–	11	.633
Texas A&M–Commerce*	8	–	10	.444	15	–	16	.484
New Orleans	8	–	10	.444	11	–	19	.367
Nicholls	7	–	11	.389	14	–	18	.438
Northwestern State	7	–	11	.389	11	–	19	.367
McNeese	2	–	16	.111	6	–	25	.194
Houston Christian	1	–	17	.056	6	–	23	.207
† 2024 Southland tournament winner * ineligible for the 2024 NCAA tournament due to transition from Division II.

The 2023–24 Lamar Lady Cardinals basketball team represented Lamar University during the 2023–24 NCAA Division I women's basketball season. The Lady Cardinals, led by fifth year head coach Aqua Franklin, played their home games at the Montagne Center in Beaumont, Texas as members of the Southland Conference. They won the Southland Conference regular season championship with a 17–1 record. Lamar was defeated by Texas A&M–Corpus Christi in the SLC tournament championship game. They were invited to compete in the inaugural 2024 WBIT. Their season ended with a first round loss to Washington State.

== Media ==
Home games were broadcast on ESPN+. Nine games during the season were broadcast on 560 KLVI/iHeartRadio.

== Previous season ==
The Lady Cardinals finished the 2022–23 season with an overall record of 20–12 and 12–6 in conference play. Their season ended losing to Southeastern Louisiana in the Southland Conference tournament championship game. Lamar entered the tournament as third seed.

== Offseason ==
Lamar announced four additions to the roster on May 1, 2023, three transfers and one recruit.

=== Incoming transfers ===
Lamar incoming transfers
Name	Number	Pos.	Height	Year	Hometown	Previous School
Teni Kuyinu	21	G	5'10"	Junior	Houston, Texas	Angelina College
Victoria Mason	2	G	5'7"	Junior	Gilbert, Arizona	Hampton University
T'Aaliyah Miner	0	G/F	5'11"	Junior	New Orleans, Louisiana	Moberly Area Community College

=== Recruits ===
Recruits
Name	Number	Pos.	Height	Year	Hometown	Previous School
Elise Jones	23	G	5'10"	Freshman	Dallas, Texas	Midlothian High School

== Preseason polls ==
=== Southland Conference Poll ===
The Southland Conference released its preseason poll on October 10, 2023. Receiving 132 overall votes and 2 first place votes, the Lady Cardinals were picked to finish third in the conference.

Predicted finish	Team	Votes (1st place)
1	Southeastern Louisiana	159 (15)
2	Texas A&M–Corpus Christi	140 (3)
3	Lamar	132 (2)
4	Incarnate Word	97
T5	Houston Christian	74
T5	McNeese	74
7	Northwestern State	65https://duckduckgo.com/
8	Texas A&M–Commerce	58
9	New Orleans	56
10	Nicholls	39

=== Preseason All Conference ===
Junior Akasha Davis, Forward/Center, was selected to the Preseason All Conference first team. Senior Sabria Dean, Guard, was selected to second team.

== Roster ==
2023–24 Lamar Lady Cardinals women's basketball team
Players
Coaches

Pos.	#	Name	Height	Year	Hometown
G/F	0	T'Aaliyah Miner	5 ft 11 in (1.8 m)	Jr	New Orleans, Louisiana
G	1	Jacei Denley	5 ft 7 in (1.7 m)	Fr	Beaumont, Texas
G	2	Victoria Mason	5 ft 7 in (1.7 m)		Gilbert, Arizona
G	3	Sabria Dean	5 ft 7 in (1.7 m)	Sr	Mineola, Texas
G	4	Brooklyn Mitchell	5 ft 7 in (1.7 m)	GS	New Orleans, Louisiana
G	5	Cameron Dill	5 ft 8 in (1.73 m)	Fr	Beaumont, Texas
G	10	Malay McQueen	5 ft 7 in (1.7 m)	GS	Arlington, Texas
F	13	Taliah Hill	6 ft 0 in (1.83 m)	Jr	Arlington, Texas
G	21	Teni Kuyinu	5 ft 10 in (1.78 m)	Jr	Houston, Texas
F	22	NJ Weems	6 ft 1 in (1.85 m)	Sr	Minneapolis, Minnesota
G	23	Elise Jones	5 ft 10 in (1.78 m)	Fr	Dallas, Texas
C	30	R'Mani Taylor	5 ft 6 in (1.68 m)	So	Houston, Texas
G/F	33	Anaya Bernard	5 ft 10 in (1.78 m)	Jr	Mansfield, Texas
F/C	41	Akasha Davis	6 ft 2 in (1.88 m)	Jr	Dallas, Texas

Head coach

- Aqua Franklin (Texas A&M)

Assistant coach(es)

6

- Bianca Smith (Colorado)
- Raymond Patche (Arizona State)
- Omar Sneed (San Jacinto/Memphis)

Legend

- (C) Team captain
- (S) Suspended
- (I) Ineligible
- (W) Walk-on
- Injured
- Current redshirt

Roster
Last update: October 25, 2023

== Schedule ==
Date time, TV	Rank^{#}	Opponent^{#}	Result	Record	High points	High rebounds	High assists	Site (attendance) city, state
Exhibition
Nov 2, 2023*; 6:00 pm		North American	W 102–37		–	–	–	Naleches Arena; Beaumont, Texas
Non-Conference season
Nov 8, 2023*; 6:00 pm, ESPN+		Texas College	W 108–34	1–0	24 – A. Davis	9 – A. Davis	7 – J. Denley	Neches Arena (728); Beaumont, Texas
Nov 10, 2023*; 5:00 pm, ESPN+		at UT Arlington	W 74–57	2–0	30 – S. Dean	5 – S. Dean	4 – NJ Weems	College Park Center (1,490); Arlington, Texas
Nov 13, 2023*; 6:00 pm, ESPN+		at Texas Tech	L 44–61	2–1	9 – R. Taylor	5 – S. Dean	2 – S. Dean	United Supermarkets Arena (3,678al); Lubbock, Texas
Nov 16, 2023; 6:00 pm, ESPN+		LSU–Alexandria	W 72–48	3–13	15 – A. Davis	6 – A. Davis	4 – B. Mitchell	Neches Arena (543); Beaumont, Texas
Nov 22, 2023*; 12:00 pm		vs. UTEP; St. Pete Showcase	W 56–44	4–1	14 – S. Dean	10 – A. Davis	3 – J. Denley	McArthur Center (212); St. Petersburg, Florida
Nov 23, 2023*; 2:30 pm		vs. Nebraska; St. Pete Showcase	L 61–75	4–2	19 – S. Dean	8 – A. Davis	5 – R. Taylor	McArthur Center (283); St. Petersburg, Florida
Dec 6, 2023*; 11:00 am, SECN+		at Texas A&M	L 51–83	4–3	16 – S. Dean	5 – B. Mitchell	4 – J. Denley	Reed Arena (7,529); College Station, Texas
Dec 13, 2023*; 5:00 pm, ESPN+		at Louisiana	W 63–60	5–3	22 – A. Davis	10 – A. Davis	4 – B. Mitchell	Cajundome (648); Lafayette, Louisiana
Dec 17, 2023*; 2:00 pm, ESPN+		at TCU	L 51–68	5–4	15 – A. Davis	14 – A. Davis	5 – R. Taylor	Schollmaier Arena (1,947); Fort Worth, Texas
Dec 30, 2023*; 2:00 pm, ESPN+		LMU	W 61–58	6–4	15 – J. Denley	6 – S. Dean	4 – J. Denley	Neches Arena (539); Beaumont, Texas
Southland regular season
Jan 4, 2024; 7:00 pm, ESPN+		Incarnate Word	W 70–53	7–4 (1–0)	29 – S. Dean	16 – A. Davis	6 – B. Mitchell	Neches Arena (603); Beaumont, Texas
Jan 6, 2024; 3:00 pm, ESPN+		Northwestern State	W 73–56	8–4 (2–0)	29 – S. Dean	9 – A. Davis	6 – R. Taylor	Neches Arena (1,367); Beaumont, Texas
Jan 11, 2024; 7:00 pm, ESPN+		at McNeese; Battle of the Border	W 82–50	9–4 (3–0)	20 – A. Davis	14 – A. Davis	4 – S. Dean	The Legacy Center (1,824); Lake Charles, Louisiana
Jan 13, 2024; 1:00 pm, ESPN+		at Nicholls	W 52–49	10–4 (4–0)	12 – S. Dean	10 – A. Davis	4 – B. Mitchell	Stopher Gymnasium (455); Thibodaux, Louisiana
Jan 18, 2024; 7:00 pm, ESPN+		Texas A&M –Commerce	L 70–73	10–5 (4–1)	21 – A. Davis	18 – A. Davis	8 – R. Taylor	Neches Arena (824); Beaumont, Texas
Jan 20, 2024; 1:00 pm, ESPN+		at Houston Christian	W 65–54	11–5 (5–1)	29 – A. Davis	15 – A. Davis	2 – Tied (2)	Sharp Gymnasium (383); Houston, Texas
Jan 25, 2024; 7:00 pm, ESPN+		New Orleans	W 65–62	12–5 (6–1)	20 – S. Dean	16 – A. Davis	3 – J. Denley	Neches Arena (626 ) Beaumont, Texas
Jan 27, 2024; 3:00 pm, ESPN+		Southeastern Louisiana	W 59–45	13–5 (7–1)	19 – A. Davis	17 – A. Davis	5 – S. Dean	Neches Arena (985); Beaumont, Texas
Feb 3, 2024; 1:00 pm, ESPN+		at Texas A&M–Corpus Christi	W 63–57	14–5 (8–1)	14 – B. Mitchell	11 – A. Davis	5 – R. Taylor	American Bank Center (1,927); Corpus Christi, Texas
Feb 8, 2024; 6:30 pm, ESPN+		at Incarnate Word	W 72–68	15–5 (9–1)	27 – N. Weems	7 – S. Dean	3 – M. McQueen	McDermott Center (192 ) San Antonio, Texas
Feb 10, 2024; 3:00 pm, ESPN+		Nicholls	W 70–44	16–5 (10–1)	17 – A. Davis	16 – A. Davis	4 – S. Dean	Neches Arena (1,597); Beaumont, Texas
Feb 15, 2024; 6:00 pm, ESPN+		at Southeastern Louisiana	W 67–60	17–5 (11–1)	16 – S. Dean	9 – A. Davis	6 – S. Dean	Pride Roofing University Center (953); Hammond, Louisiana
Feb 17, 2024; 2:00 pm , ESPN+		at New Orleans	W 63–60	18–5 (12–1)	19 – A. Davis	13 – A. Davis	6 – R. Taylor	Lakefront Arena (588); New Orleans, Louisiana
Feb 22, 2024; 7:00 pm , ESPN+		McNeese; Battle of the Border	W 73–43	19–5 (13–1)	14 – S. Dean	10 – A. Davis	6 – S. Dean	Neches Arena (1,896); Beaumont, Texas
Feb 24, 2024; 3:00 pm, ESPN+		Texas A&M–Corpus Christi	W 68–63	20–5 (14–1)	18 – A. Davis	16 – A. Davis	5 – J. Denley	Neches Arena (1,862); Beaumont, Texas
Feb 29, 2024; 6:30 pm, ESPN+		at Texas A&M–Commerce	W 74–58	21–5 (15–1)	22 – A. Davis	16 – A. Davis	3 – N. Weems	The Field House (472); Commerce, Texas
Mar 2, 2024; 1:00 pm, ESPN+		at Northwestern State	W 80–64	22–5 (16–1)	24 – A. Davis	11 – A. Davis	2 – S. Dean	Prather Coliseum (840); Natchitoches, Louisiana
Mar 7, 2024; 6:00 pm, ESPN+		Houston Christian	W 69–47	23–5 (17–1)	16 – A. Davis	10 – A. Davis	4 – S. Dean	Neches Arena (1,000); Beaumont, Texas
2024 Jersey Mike's Subs Southland Conference Tournament
Mar 13, 2024; 11:00 am, ESPN+	(1)	vs. (5) Texas A&M–Commerce; Semifinals	W 83–58	24–5	23 – A. Davis	13 – S. Dean	3 – R. Taylor	The Legacy Center; Lake Charles, LA
Mar 14, 2024; 4:00 pm, ESPN+	(1)	vs. (2) Texas A&M–Corpus Christi; Championship	L 61–68	24–6	19 – S. Dean	11 – A. Davis	6 – B. Mitchell	The Legacy Center (700); Lake Charles, LA
2024 Women's Basketball Invitation Tournament
Mar 21, 2024; 8:00 pm, ESPN+	(8)	at (1) Washington State; First round	L 46–66	24–7	12 – J. Denley	10 – A. Davis	2 – J. Denley	Beasley Coliseum (490); Pullman, WA
*Non-conference game. ^{#}Rankings from AP Poll. (#) Tournament seedings in parentheses. All times are in Central Time.

== Conference awards and honors ==
=== Weekly awards ===
Weekly honors
Honors	Player	Position	Date Awarded	Ref.
SLC Women's Basketball Player of the Week	Sabria Dean	G	November 13, 2023	
SLC Women's Basketball Player of the Week	Sabria Dean	G	November 27, 2023	
SLC Women's Basketball Player of the Week	Akasha Davis	F/C	December 18, 2023	
SLC Women's Basketball Player of the Week	Sabria Dean	G	January 8, 2024	
SLC Women's Basketball Player of the Week	Akasha Davis	F/C	January 22, 2024	
SLC Women's Basketball Player of the Week	Akasha Davis	F/C	January 29, 2024	
SLC Women's Basketball Player of the Week	Akasha Davis	F/C	March 4, 2024	

== See also ==
2023–24 Lamar Cardinals basketball team
