= 2023–24 McNeese Cowgirls basketball team =

Intercollegiate basketball season

2023–24 McNeese Cowgirls basketball
- Conference: Southland Conference
- Record: 6–25 (2–16 Southland)
- Head coach: Lynn Kennedy (3rd season)
- Assistant coaches: Kiana Brown; Sydney Schultz; Le'Shenae Stubblefield; Kylie Jimenez
- Home arena: The Legacy Center (Capacity: 4,200)

2023–24 Southland Conference women's basketball standings
	Conf.				Overall
Team	W		L	PCT	W		L	PCT
Lamar	17	–	1	.944	24	–	7	.774
Texas A&M–Corpus Christi †	14	–	4	.778	23	–	9	.719
Southeastern Louisiana	14	–	4	.778	19	–	12	.613
Incarnate Word	12	–	6	.667	19	–	11	.633
Texas A&M–Commerce*	8	–	10	.444	15	–	16	.484
New Orleans	8	–	10	.444	11	–	19	.367
Nicholls	7	–	11	.389	14	–	18	.438
Northwestern State	7	–	11	.389	11	–	19	.367
McNeese	2	–	16	.111	6	–	25	.194
Houston Christian	1	–	17	.056	6	–	23	.207
† 2024 Southland tournament winner * ineligible for the 2024 NCAA tournament due to transition from Division II.

The 2023–24 McNeese Cowgirls basketball team represented McNeese State University during the 2023–24 NCAA Division I women's basketball season. The Cowgirls, led by third year head coach Lynn Kennedy, played their home games at The Legacy Center located on the McNeese State University campus in Lake Charles, Louisiana. They were members of the Southland Conference.

== Media ==
Home games are broadcast on ESPN+.

== Preseason polls ==
=== Southland Conference Poll ===
The Southland Conference released its preseason poll on October 10, 2023. Receiving 74 overall votes, the Cowgirls were in a tie to finish fifth in the conference.

Predicted finish	Team	Votes (1st place)
1	Southeastern Louisiana	159 (15)
2	Texas A&M–Corpus Christi	140 (3)
3	Lamar	132 (2)
4	Incarnate Word	97
T5	Houston Christian	74
T5	McNeese	74
7	Northwestern State	65
8	Texas A&M–Commerce	58
9	New Orleans	56
10	Nicholls	39

=== Preseason All Conference ===
No Cowgirls were selected to a Preseason All-Conference team.

== Roster ==
2023–24 McNeese State Cowgirls women's basketball team
Players
Coaches

Pos.	#	Name	Height	Year	Hometown
G	1	Azjah Reeves	5 ft 7 in (1.7 m)	Sr	Delhi, Louisiana
G	3	Crystal Hayes	6 ft 4 in (1.93 m)	Fr	Houston, Texas
F	4	Julia Puente	6 ft 2 in (1.88 m)	So	Barcelona, Spain
G	5	Cristina Gil	5 ft 8 in (1.73 m)	Jr	Barcelona, Spain
G	6	Anna Cabañas Llorens	5 ft 8 in (1.73 m)	So	Algemesí, Spain
F	12	Alva Mofalk	6 ft 4 in (1.93 m)	Fr	Luleå, Sweden
F	13	Helena Galunic	6 ft 1 in (1.85 m)	Jr	Zagreb, Croatia
G	14	Mireia Yespes	6 ft 2 in (1.88 m)	Jr	Barcelona, Spain
F	15	Marta Hermoso	6 ft 2 in (1.88 m)	So	Seville, Spain
G	20	Clara Rosini	5 ft 10 in (1.78 m)	Jr	Trieste, Italy
G	21	Boston Berry	5 ft 7 in (1.7 m)	RS Fr	Jones, Oklahoma
F	22	Grace Wener	6 ft 4 in (1.93 m)	So	Kissimmee, Florida
G	23	Emilia Tenbrock	6 ft 1 in (1.85 m)	Jr	Düsseldorf, Germany
G	33	Gabrielle Wener	6 ft 3 in (1.91 m)	Jr	Kissimmee, Florida
F	44	Daniella Vallecilla	6 ft 4 in (1.93 m)	Fr	Houston, Texas

Head coach

- Lynn Kennedy Bushnell)

Assistant coach(es)

- Kiana Brown (Portland State)
- Sydney Schultz (Portland State)
- Le'Shenae Stubblefield (McNeese State)
- Kylie Jimenez (Portland State)

Legend

- (C) Team captain
- (S) Suspended
- (I) Ineligible
- (W) Walk-on
- Injured
- Current redshirt

Roster
Last update: October 25, 2023

== Schedule ==
Date time, TV	Rank^{#}	Opponent^{#}	Result	Record	High points	High rebounds	High assists	Site (attendance) city, state
Non-conference regular season
Nov 6, 2023*; 11:00 am		Dillard	W 76–47	1–0	12 – M. Yespes	9 – J. Puente	3 – C. Gil	The Legacy Center (3,533); Lake Charles, LA
Nov 12, 2023*; 3:00 pm		Prairie View A&M	L 70–85	1–1	16 – M. Yespes	11 – M. Yespes	4 – E. Tenbrock	The Legacy Center (1,6795); Lake Charles, LA
Nov 16, 2022*; 7:00 pm		Mississippi Valley State; McNeese MTE	L 82–85	1–2	26 – E. Tenbrock	6 – A. Reeves	6 – B. Berry	The Legacy Center (1,698); Lake Charles, Louisiana
Nov 17, 2023*; 7:00 pm		Milwaukee; McNeese MTE	L 67–88	1–3	18 – M. Yespes	6 – M. Yespes	5 – B. Berry	The Legacy Center (1,669); Lake Charles, Louisiana
Nov 18, 2023*; 4:00 pm		Louisiana–Monroe; McNeese MTE	L 53–87	1–4	14 – C. Gil	8 – M. Yespes	3 – M. Yespes	The Legacy Center (1,702); Lake Charles, Louisiana
Nov 21, 2023*; 5:00 pm		North American	W 107–77	2–4	23 – C. Gil	14 – J. Puente	6 – C. Gil	The Legacy Center (1,670); Lake Charles, Louisiana
Nov 24, 2023*; 2:00 pm, ESPN+		at No. 14 Baylor	L 44–124	2–5	12 – B. Berry	6 – B. Berry	1 – B. Berry	Ferrell Center (3,713); Waco, Texas
Nov 26, 2023*; 1:00 pm		Ecclesia	W 102–28	3–5	22 – Tenbrock	7 – Puente	7 – Berry	The Legacy Center (1,619); Lake Charles, Louisiana
Dec 6, 2023*; 6:00 pm, ESPN+		at No. 13 Kansas State	L 39–101	3–6	10 – A. Mofalk	5 – A. Reeves	3 – B. Berry	Bramlage Coliseum (3,245); Manhattan, Kansas
Dec 12, 2023*; 7:00 pm, SECN+		at No. 7 LSU	L 44–133	3–7	12 – Tied	5 – A. Mofalk	5 – B. Berry	Pete Maravich Assembly Center (10,653); Baton Rouge, Louisiana
Dec 14, 2023*; 5:30 pm		Centenary	W 93–46	4–7	35 – M. Yespes	11 – H. Galunic	5 – B. Berry	The Legacy Center (1,714); Lake Charles, Louisiana
Dec 16, 2023*; 1:00 pm, ESPN+		Tarleton State	L 64–88	4–8	22 – E. Tenbrock	6 – H. Galunic	4 – E. Tenbrock	The Legacy Center (1,667); Lake Charles, Louisiana
Dec 31, 2023*; 1:00 pm		Arkansas–Pine Bluff	L 87–103	4–9	24 – E. Tenbrock	11 – M. Yespes	8 – D. Berry	The Legacy Center (1,693); Lake Charles, Louisiana
Southland regular season
Jan 4, 2024; 6:30 pm, ESPN+		at Northwestern State	L 54–78	4–10 (0–1)	14 – B. Berry	7 – B. Berry	2 – B. Berry	Prather Coliseum (494); Natchitoches, Louisiana
Jan 6, 2024; 3:30 pm, ESPN+		at Texas A&M–Commerce	L 78–87	4–11 (0–2)	40 – E. Tenbrock	10 – C. Rosini	3 – B. Berry	The Field House (572); Commerce, Texas
Jan 11, 2024; 7:00 pm, ESPN+		Lamar; Battle of the Border (Rivalry)	L 50–82	4–12 (0–3)	25 – E. Tenbrock	9 – E. Tenbrock	2 – C. Rosini	The Legacy Center (1,824); Lake Charles, Louisiana
Jan 13, 2024; 1:00 pm, ESPN+		Southeastern Louisiana	L 63–77 ^{OT}	4–13 (0–4)	26 – M. Yespes	14 – M. Yespes	6 – A. Reeves	The Legacy Center (2,208); Lake Charles, Louisiana
Jan 18, 2024; 7:00 pm, ESPN+		at Texas A&M–Corpus Christi	L 63–83	4–14 (0–5)	22 – E. Tenbrock	8 – J. Puente Valverde	5 – B. Berry	American Bank Center (818); Corpus Christi, Texas
Jan 20, 2024; 2:00 pm, ESPN+		at Incarnate Word	L 55–67	4–15 (0–6)	22 – E. Tenbrock	8 – J. Puente Valverde	5 – B. Berry	McDermott Center; San Antonio, Texas
Jan 25, 2024; 7:00 pm, ESPN+		Northwestern State	L 44–60	4–16 (0–7)	13 – M. Yespes	11 – J. Puente Valverde	2 – Tied (2)	The Legacy Center (1,774); Lake Charles, Louisiana
Jan 27, 2024; 1:00 pm, ESPN+		New Orleans	L 59–74	4–17 (0–8)	17 – E. Tenbrock	8 – C. Rosini	2 – E. Tenbrock	The Legacy Center (1,340); Lake Charles, Louisiana
Feb 1, 2024; 7:00 pm, ESPN+		Texas A&M–Commerce	L 70–94	4–18 (0–9)	20 – E. Tenbrock	10 – J. Puente Valverde	– M. Yespes	The Legacy Center (1,687); Lake Charles, Louisiana
Feb 3, 2024; 1:00 pm, ESPN+		at Southeastern Louisiana	L 69–80	4–19 (0–10)	19 – J. Puente Valverde	10 – J. Puente Valverde	5 – A. Reeves	Pride Roofing University Center (705); Hammond, Louisiana
Feb 8, 2024; 6:00 pm, ESPN+		at Houston Christian	L 51–56	4–20 (0–11)	14 – E. Tenbrock	8 – E. Tenbrock	3 – C. Gil	Sharp Gymnasium (200); Houston, Texas
Feb 10, 2024; 1:00 pm, ESPN+		Texas A&M–Corpus Christi	L 64–78	4–21 (0–12)	15 – C. Gil	8 – C. Rosini	4 – E. Tenbrock	The Legacy Center (1,104); Lake Charles, Louisiana
Feb 17, 2024; 1:00 pm, ESPN+		at Nicholls	L 67–81	4–22 (0–13)	– M. Yespes	– E. Tenbrock	– B. Berry	Stopher Gymnasium (511); Thibodaux, Louisiana
Feb 22, 2024; 7:00 pm, ESPN+		at Lamar; Battle of the Border (Rivalry)	L 43–73	4–23 (0–14)	11 – M. Yespes	11 – J. Puente Valverde	3 – C. Rosini	Neches Arena (1,896); Beaumont, Texas
Feb 24, 2024; 1:00 pm, ESPN+		Incarnate Word	L 48–61	4–24 (0–15)	23 – M. Yespes	10 – C. Rosini	2 – A. Reeves	The Legacy Center (347); Lake Charles, Louisiana
Feb 29, 2024; 7:00 pm, ESPN+		Houston Christian	W 72–64	5–24 (1–15)	23 – M. Yespes	13 – C. Rosini	5 – E. Tenbrock	The Legacy Center (1,190); Lake Charles, Louisiana
Mar 2, 2024; 1:00 pm, ESPN+		Nicholls	W 78–76	6–24 (2–15)	19 – M. Yespes	11 – C. Rosini	6 – B. Berry	The Legacy Center (1,321); Lake Charles, Louisiana
Mar 6, 2024; 6:30 pm, ESPN+		at New Orleans	L 64–67	6–25 (2–16)	23 – E. Tenbrock	13 – C. Rosini	3 – E. Tenbrock	Lakefront Arena (543); New Orleans, Louisiana
*Non-conference game. ^{#}Rankings from AP Poll. (#) Tournament seedings in parentheses. All times are in Central Time.

== See also ==
- 2023–24 McNeese Cowboys basketball team
