= 2023–24 Incarnate Word Cardinals women's basketball team =

Intercollegiate basketball season

2023–24 Incarnate Word Cardinals women's basketball
- Conference: Southland Conference
- Record: 19–11 (12–6 Southland)
- Head coach: Jeff Dow (5th season)
- Assistant coaches: Amber Cunningham; Beverly Holmes; Rachel Baity
- Home arena: McDermott Center (Capacity: 2,000)

2023–24 Southland Conference women's basketball standings
	Conf.				Overall
Team	W		L	PCT	W		L	PCT
Lamar	17	–	1	.944	24	–	7	.774
Texas A&M–Corpus Christi †	14	–	4	.778	23	–	9	.719
Southeastern Louisiana	14	–	4	.778	19	–	12	.613
Incarnate Word	12	–	6	.667	19	–	11	.633
Texas A&M–Commerce*	8	–	10	.444	15	–	16	.484
New Orleans	8	–	10	.444	11	–	19	.367
Nicholls	7	–	11	.389	14	–	18	.438
Northwestern State	7	–	11	.389	11	–	19	.367
McNeese	2	–	16	.111	6	–	25	.194
Houston Christian	1	–	17	.056	6	–	23	.207
† 2024 Southland tournament winner * ineligible for the 2024 NCAA tournament due to transition from Division II.

The 2023–24 Incarnate Word Cardinals women's basketball team represented the University of the Incarnate Word in the 2023–24 NCAA Division I women's basketball season. The Cardinals were led by fifth-year coach Jeff Dow, and were members of the Southland Conference (SLC). The team compiled an overall record of 19–11 and a 12–6 record in conference play. Their season ended in the first round of the SLC tournament losing to Texas A&M–Commerce.

== Media ==
Home games were broadcast on ESPN+.

== Preseason polls ==
=== Southland Conference Poll ===
The Southland Conference released its preseason poll on October 10, 2023. Receiving 97 overall votes, the Cardinals were picked to finish fourth in the conference.

Predicted finish	Team	Votes (1st place)
1	Southeastern Louisiana	159 (15)
2	Texas A&M–Corpus Christi	140 (3)
3	Lamar	132 (2)
4	Incarnate Word	97
T5	Houston Christian	74
T5	McNeese	74
7	Northwestern State	65
8	Texas A&M–Commerce	58
9	New Orleans	56
10	Nicholls	39

=== Preseason All Conference ===
No Cardinals were selected to the Preseason All Conference first team. Senior Nina De Leon Negron, a guard, was selected to second team.

== Roster ==
2023–24 Incarnate Word Cardinals women's basketball team
Players
Coaches

Pos.	#	Name	Height	Year	Hometown
G	0	Hannah Wheeler	5 ft 6 in (1.68 m)	Sr	Cedar Park, TX
F	2	Kaylee Howell	6 ft 2 in (1.88 m)	So	Rockport, TX
G	3	Nina De Leon Negron	5 ft 6 in (1.68 m)	Sr	San Juan, PR
G	4	Sophia Griego	5 ft 10 in (1.78 m)	RS Fr	Austin, TX
G	5	Myra Bell	5 ft 10 in (1.78 m)	Sr	San Antonio, TX
G	10	Destiny Terrell	5 ft 9 in (1.75 m)	Sr	Dallas, TX
G	11	Aliyah Collins	5 ft 3 in (1.6 m)	So	College Station, TX
G	12	Paloma Simón	5 ft 11 in (1.8 m)	So	Alcobendas, Spain
F	13	Chloe Storer	6 ft 0 in (1.83 m)	Sr	Wangaratta, Australia
F	14	Brenna Perez	6 ft 0 in (1.83 m)	Sr	San Antonio, TX
F	21	Mallory McQuietor	6 ft 1 in (1.85 m)	Fr	Keller, TX
F	22	Breelyn Sanborn	5 ft 11 in (1.8 m)	So	Spring, TX
G	24	Destiny Whitaker	5 ft 10 in (1.78 m)	Fr	Dallas, TX
G	32	Jorja Elliott	5 ft 11 in (1.8 m)	So	Hickory Creek, TX
F	35	Raimi McCrary	5 ft 11 in (1.8 m)	Fr	Allen, TX

Head coach

- Jeff Dow (Oregon)

Assistant coach(es)

- Amber Cunningham (Rice)
- Beverly Holmes (Millsaps)
- Rachel Baity (Our Lady of the Lake)

Legend

- (C) Team captain
- (S) Suspended
- (I) Ineligible
- (W) Walk-on
- Injured
- Current redshirt

Roster
Last update: April, 2024

== Schedule ==
Date time, TV	Rank^{#}	Opponent^{#}	Result	Record	High points	High rebounds	High assists	Site (attendance) city, state
Non-conference regular season
November 7, 2023*; 11:00 a.m., ESPN+		Our Lady of the Lake	W 68–40	1–0	12 – C. Storer	7 – J. Ellion	3 – N. De Leon Negron	McDermott Center (557); San Antonio, TX
November 12, 2023*; 1:00 p.m., ESPN+		New Mexico State	L 52–59	1–1	12 – N. De Leon Negron	7 – D. Terrell	5 – A. Collins	McDermott Center (103); San Antonio, TX
November 15, 2023*; 12:00 p.m., ESPN+		at TCU	L 55–61	1–2	17 – A. Collins	8 – N. De Leon Negron	6 – A. Collins	Schollmaier Arena (4,754); Fort Worth, TX
November 19, 2023*; 2:00 p.m., ESPN+		UT Rio Grande Valley	W 67–57	2–2	7 – J. Elliontt	9 – D. Terrell	5 – N. De Leon Negron	McDermott Center (261); San Antonio, TX
November 27, 2023*; 5:30 p.m.		at Prairie View A&M	W 57–44	3–2	20 – Storer	10 – Storer	3 – De Leon Negron	William J. Nicks Building (246); Prairie View, TX
December 2, 2023*; 2:00 p.m., ESPN+		Dallas Christian	W 103–52	4–2	16 – A. Collins	8 – R. McCrary	5 – R. McCrary	McDermott Center (95); San Antonio, TX
December 10, 2023*; 2:00 p.m., ESPN+		at Tarleton State	W 57–42	5–2	16 – D. Terrell	7 – D. Terrell	3 – A. Collins	Wisdom Gymnasium (419); Stephenville, TX
December 13, 2023*; 11:30 p.m., ESPN+		at Texas Tech	L 35–76	5–3	8 – D. Terrell	4 – D. Terrell	3 – N. De Leon Negron	United Supermarkets Arena (13,748); Lubbock, TX
December 16, 2023*; 2:00 p.m., ESPN+		St. Edward's	W 57–49	6–3	15 – N. De Leon Negron	8 – J. Elliott	5 – N. De Leon Negron	McDermott Center (164); San Antonio, TX
December 20, 2023*; 1:00 p.m., ESPN+		Texas Lutheran	W 70–36	7–3	13 – B. Sanborn	7 – D. Terrell	4 – C. Storer	McDermott Center (126); San Antonio, TX
December 31, 2023*; 1:00 p.m., ESPN+		at Arkansas	L 48–67	7–4	10 – J. Elliott	11 – D. Terrell	6 – N. De Leon Negron	Bud Walton Arena (3,420); Fayetteville, AR
Southland regular season
January 4, 2024; 7:00 p.m., ESPN+		at Lamar	L 53–70	5–7 (0–1)	13 – D. Terrell	8 – D. Terrell	2 – D. Terrell	Neches Arena (603); Beaumont, TX
January 6, 2023; 2:00 p.m., ESPN+		Texas A&M–Corpus Christi	L 61–63	7–6 (0–2)	19 – A. Collins	10 – D. Terrell	4 – A. Collins	McDermott Center; San Antonio, TX
January 11, 2023; 6:30 p.m., ESPN+		at Texas A&M–Commerce	W 70–62	8–6 (1–2)	21 – A. Collins	9 – N. De Leon Negron	4 – J. Elliott	The Field House (238); Commerce, TX
January 13, 2023; 1:00 p.m., ESPN+		at Northwestern State	W 63–57	9–6 (2–2)	16 – D. Terrell	11 – N. De Leon Negron	5 – A. Collins	Prather Coliseum (411); Natchitoches, LA
January 18, 2023; 6:30 p.m., ESPN+		Nicholls	L 59–65	9–7 (2–3)	14 – A. Collins	9 – N. De Leon Negron	3 – N. De Leon Negron	McDermott Center (120); San Antonio, TX
January 20, 2023; 2:00 p.m., ESPN+		McNeese	W 67–55	10–7 (3–3)	16 – N. De Leon Negron	10 – tied (2)	4 – tied (2)	McDermott Center; San Antonio, TX
January 27, 2023; 2:00 p.m., ESPN+		Houston Christian	W 77–49	11–7 (4–3)	11 – M. Bell	9 – N. De Leon Negron	6 – N. De Leon Negron	McDermott Center (181); San Antonio, TX
February 1, 2023; 6:00 p.m., ESPN+		at Southeastern Louisiana	L 86–93 ^{OT}	11–8 (4–4)	22 – N. De Leon Negron	12 – N. De Leon Negron	7 – N. De Leon Negron	Pride Roofing University Center (1,248); Hammond, LA
February 3, 2023; 2:00 p.m., ESPN+		at New Orleans	W 64–54	12–8 (5–4)	17 – D. Terrell	8 – M. Bell	6 – N. De Leon Legron	Lakefront Arena (440); New Orleans, LA
February 8, 2023; 6:30 p.m., ESPN+		Lamar	L 68–72	12–9 (5–5)	28 – A. Collins	8 – N. De Leon Negron	3 – N. De Leon Negron	McDermott Center (192); San Antonio, TX
February 10, 2023; 1:00 p.m., ESPN+		at Houston Christian	W 67–40	13–9 (6–5)	14 – J. Elliott	9 – D. Terrell	3 – A. Collins	Sharp Gymnasium (231); Houston, TX
February 15, 2023; 6:30 p.m., ESPN+		Texas A&M–Commerce	W 72–61	14–9 (7–5)	25 – J. Elliott	12 – N. Leon Negron	4 – A. Collins	McDermott Center (104); San Antonio, TX
February 17, 2023; 2:00 p.m., ESPN+		Northwestern State	W 53–45	15–9 (8–5)	20 – J. Ntambwe	8 – J. Ntambwe	4 – K. Dean	McDermott Center (110); San Antonio, TX
February 22, 2023; 6:30 p.m., ESPN+		at Nicholls	W 52–47	16–9 (9–5)	16 – A. Collins	6 – M. Bell	3 – N. De Leon Negron	Stopher Gymnasium (433); Thibodaux, LA
February 24, 2023; 1:30 p.m., ESPN+		at McNeese	W 61–48	17–9 (10–5)	15 – A. Collins	10 – D. Terrell	4 – N. De Leon Negron	The Legacy Center (347); Lake Charles, LA
February 29, 2023; 6:30 p.m., ESPN+		Southeastern Louisiana	W 53–51	18–9 (11–5)	15 – N. De Leon Negron	13 – D. Terrell	5 – N. De Leon Negron	McDermott Center (169); San Antonio, TX
March 2, 2023; 2:00 p.m., ESPN+		New Orleans	W 79–76 ^{OT}	19–9 (12–5)	28 – N. De Leon Negron	11 – D. Terrell	3 – N. De Leon Negron	McDermott Center (319); San Antonio, TX
March 6, 2023; 7:00 p.m., ESPN+		at Texas A&M–Corpus Christi	L 43–65	19–10 (12–6)	9 – N. De Leon Negron	8 – D. Terrell	2 – N. De Leon Negron	American Bank Center (1,744); Corpus Christi, TX
2024 Jersey Mike's Subs Southland Conference tournament
March 12, 2024; 11:00 a.m., ESPN+	(4)	vs. (5) Texas A&M–Commerce; Second round	L 57–66	19–11	14 – N. De Leon Negron	9 – N. De Leon Negron	3 – N. De Leon Negron	The Legacy Center; Lake Charles, LA
*Non-conference game. ^{#}Rankings from AP poll. (#) Tournament seedings in parentheses. All times are in Central.

== Conference awards and honors ==
=== Weekly awards ===
Weekly honors
Honors	Player	Position	Date awarded	Ref.
SLC Women's Basketball Player of the Week	Aliyah Collins	G	November 20, 2023	
SLC Women's Basketball Player of the Week	Nina De Leon Negron	G	February 19, 2024	

== See also ==
- 2023–24 Incarnate Word Cardinals men's basketball team
