= 2023–24 Nicholls Colonels women's basketball team =

Intercollegiate basketball season

2023–24 Nicholls Colonels women's basketball
- Conference: Southland Conference
- Record: 14–18 (7–11 Southland)
- Head coach: Justin Payne (1st season)
- Assistant coaches: Nicholas Graham; Tykeria Williams; Jada Terry
- Home arena: Stopher Gym

2023–24 Southland Conference women's basketball standings
	Conf.				Overall
Team	W		L	PCT	W		L	PCT
Lamar	17	–	1	.944	24	–	7	.774
Texas A&M–Corpus Christi †	14	–	4	.778	23	–	9	.719
Southeastern Louisiana	14	–	4	.778	19	–	12	.613
Incarnate Word	12	–	6	.667	19	–	11	.633
Texas A&M–Commerce*	8	–	10	.444	15	–	16	.484
New Orleans	8	–	10	.444	11	–	19	.367
Nicholls	7	–	11	.389	14	–	18	.438
Northwestern State	7	–	11	.389	11	–	19	.367
McNeese	2	–	16	.111	6	–	25	.194
Houston Christian	1	–	17	.056	6	–	23	.207
† 2024 Southland tournament winner * ineligible for the 2024 NCAA tournament due to transition from Division II.

The 2023–24 Nicholls Colonels women's basketball team represented Nicholls State University during the 2023–24 NCAA Division I women's basketball season. The Colonels, led by first-year head coach Justin Payne, played their home games at Stopher Gym in Thibodaux, Louisiana as members of the Southland Conference. The Colonels compiled a 14–18 overall record and a 7–11 record in conference play. Their season ended with a 57–75 second-round loss to Southeastern Louisiana in the Southland Conference tournament.

== Media ==
Home games were broadcast on ESPN+.

== Previous season ==
The Colonels finished the 2022–23 season with a 5–24 overall record and a 2–16 record for last place in Southland Conference play. They failed to qualify for the 2023 Southland Conference women's basketball tournament.

== Preseason polls ==
=== Southland Conference poll ===
The Southland Conference released its preseason poll on October 10, 2023. Receiving 39 overall votes, the Colonels were picked to finish tenth in the conference.

Predicted finish	Team	Votes (1st place)
1	Southeastern Louisiana	159 (15)
2	Texas A&M–Corpus Christi	140 (3)
3	Lamar	132 (2)
4	Incarnate Word	97
T–5	Houston Christian	74
T–5	McNeese	74
7	Northwestern State	65
8	Texas A&M–Commerce	58
9	New Orleans	56
10	Nicholls	39

=== Preseason All Conference ===
Sophomore Lexi Alexander, a forward, was selected as a member of the Preseason All-Conference second team.

== Roster ==
2023–24 Nicholls Colonels women's basketball team
Players
Coaches

Pos.	#	Name	Height	Year	Hometown
G	0	Amelia Sandie	5 ft 7 in (1.7 m)	RS Jr	Brighton, England
G	1	Mikayla Etienne	—	Sr	Monroe, LA
G	2	Marypaz Martinez	—	Fr	Tres Ríos, Costa Rica
G	3	Ashley Malone	5 ft 7 in (1.7 m)	Sr	Nashville, TN
G	5	Traya Bruce	5 ft 7 in (1.7 m)	RS Sr	Cut Off, LA
G	7	Betzalys Delgado	—	Fr	Arecibo, Puerto Rico
F	10	Victoria Woods	6 ft 2 in (1.88 m)	Jr	Elton, LA
G	11	Britiya Curtis	—	Fr	Calhoun, GA
G	12	Kyla Hamilton	5 ft 6 in (1.68 m)	Sr	Westlake, LA
G	14	Adrian Mann	5 ft 8 in (1.73 m)	RS Jr	Mokane, MO
F	20	Adyson James	5 ft 8 in (1.73 m)	Fr	San Antonio, TX
F	21	Lexi Alexander	6 ft 0 in (1.83 m)	So	Round Rock, TX
G/F	22	Deonna Brister	5 ft 11 in (1.8 m)	Jr	Lake Arthur, LA
F	23	Daelyn Craig	6 ft 0 in (1.83 m)	Jr	Lithonia, GA
G	24	Malaysia DePrisco	5 ft 9 in (1.75 m)	So	Austin, TX
G	25	Violet Skipworth	5 ft 11 in (1.8 m)	Jr	Pace, FL
C	30	Kate Manley	6 ft 4 in (1.93 m)	Sr	Roswell, GA
F	35	Khia Lee	5 ft 10 in (1.78 m)	Jr	Manchester, England

Head coach

- Justin Payne (Nicholls State)

Assistant coach(es)

- Nicholas Graham
- Tykeria Williams
- Jada Terry

Legend

- (C) Team captain
- (S) Suspended
- (I) Ineligible
- (W) Walk-on
- Injured
- Current redshirt

Roster
Last update: October 26, 2023

== Schedule ==
Date time, TV	Rank^{#}	Opponent^{#}	Result	Record	High points	High rebounds	High assists	Site (attendance) city, state
Non-conference regular season
November 6, 2023*; 6:30 p.m., ESPN+		North American	W 82–65	1–0	19 – L. Alexander	11 – L. Alexander	5 – B. Curtis	Stopher Gymnasium (250); Thibodaux, LA
November 8, 2023*; 6:00 p.m., ESPN+		at Tulane	W 69–66	2–0	18 – B. Curtis	8 – B. Curtis	6 – B. Delgado	Devlin Fieldhouse (594); New Orleans, LA
November 10, 2023*; 11:00 a.m., ESPN+		SUNO	W 94–52	3–0	16 – A. Malone	8 – V. Skipworth	5 – B. Delgado	Stopher Gymnasium (1,900); Thibodaux, LA
November 14, 2023*; 11:00 a.m., ESPN+		at SMU	L 54–69	3–1	13 – A. Malone	8 – B. Delgado	8 – B. Delgado	Moody Coliseum (4,548); Dallas, TX
November 18, 2023*; 2:00 p.m., ESPN+		at Louisiana	L 63–69 ^{OT}	3–2	13 – B. Curtis	10 – L. Alexander	6 – B. Delgado	Cajundome (808); Lafayette, LA
November 24, 2023*; 1:00 p.m.		vs. Eastern Illinois; GCU Classic	W 63–55	4–2	17 – L. Alexander	7 – L. Alexander	3 – K. Hamilton	Grand Canyon University Arena (212); Phoenix, AZ
November 25, 2023*; 3:30 p.m., ESPN+		at Grand Canyon; GCU Classic	L 40–63	4–3	14 – T. Bruce	6 – D. Brister	3 – D. Brister	Grand Canyon University Arena (502); Phoenix, AZ
November 28, 2023*; 6:30 p.m., ESPN+		Dillard	W 68–36	5–3	13 – E. Diaz	9 – C. Lowe	1 – E. Diaz	Stopher Gymnasium (333); Thibodaux, LA
November 30, 2023*; 6:00 p.m.		at Alcorn State	L 46–54	5–4	15 – Curtis	5 – Etienne	2 – Hamilton	Davey Whitney Complex (152); Lorman, MS
December 4, 2023*; 7:00 p.m., ESPN+		at South Alabama	W 61–58	6–4	25 – L. Alexander	8 – L. Alexander	4 – L. Alexander	Mitchell Center (329); Mobile, AL
December 9, 2023*; 1:00 p.m., ESPN+		UAB	L 62–73	6–5	18 – L. Alexander	8 – D. Brister	3 – D. Craig	Stopher Gymnasium (344); Thibodaux, LA
December 20, 2023*; 12:00 p.m.		at Grambling	L 50–69	6–6	13 – M. Etienne	6 – M. Etienne	4 – K. Hamilton	Fredrick C. Hobdy Assembly Center (87); Grambling, LA
Southland regular season
January 4, 2024; 6:30 p.m., ESPN+		Southeastern Louisiana	L 56–66	6–7 (0–1)	16 – M. Etienne	10 – D. Craig	3 – L. Alexander	Stopher Gymnasium (433); Thibodaux, LA
January 6, 2024; 1:00 p.m., ESPN+		at Houston Christian	W 73–55	7–7 (1–1)	22 – L. Alexander	10 – D. Craig	5 – B. Curtis	Sharp Gymnasium (243); Houston, TX
January 11, 2024; 6:30 p.m., ESPN+		New Orleans	L 63–69	7–8 (1–2)	16 – M. Etienne	9 – B. Curtis	4 – K. Hamilton	Stopher Gymnasium (376); Thibodaux, LA
January 13, 2024; 1:00 p.m., ESPN+		Lamar	L 49–52	7–9 (1–3)	14 – K. Hamilton	7 – D. Brister	3 – K. Hamilton	Stopher Gymnasium (455); Thibodaux, LA
January 18, 2024; 6:30 p.m., ESPN+		at Incarnate Word	W 65–59	8–9 (2–3)	19 – D. Brister	5 – D. Brister	5 – K. Hamilton	McDermott Center (120); San Antonio, TX
January 20, 2024; 1:00 p.m., ESPN+		at Texas A&M–Corpus Christi	L 52–58	8–10 (2–4)	14 – B. Curtis	9 – L. Alexander	4 – K. Hamilton	American Bank Center (1,247); Corpus Christi, TX
January 27, 2024; 3:30 p.m., ESPN+		at Texas A&M–Commerce	L 67–71	8–11 (2–5)	16 – B. Curtis	11 – D. Craig	6 – K. Hamilton	The Field House (412); Commerce, TX
February 1, 2024; 6:30 p.m., ESPN+		Northwestern State	W 60–57	9–11 (3–5)	20 – L. Alexander	6 – D. Brister	4 – K. Hamilton	Stopher Gymnasium (412); Thibodaux, LA
February 3, 2024; 1:00 p.m., ESPN+		Houston Christian	W 52–50	10–11 (4–5)	10 – K. Hamilton	9 – D. Craig	2 – K. Hamilton	Stopher Gymnasium (503); Thibodaux, LA
February 8, 2024; 6:30 p.m., ESPN+		Texas A&M–Corpus Christi	W 70–67	11–11 (5–5)	21 – L. Alexander	9 – K. Hamilton	7 – K. Hamilton	Stopher Gymnasium (458); Thibodaux, LA
February 10, 2024; 3:00 p.m., ESPN+		at Lamar	L 44–70	11–12 (5–6)	16 – L. Alexander	7 – L. Alexander	4 – B. Delgado	Neches Arena (1,597); Beaumont, TX
February 15, 2024; 6:30 p.m., ESPN+		New Orleans	L 78–80	11–13 (5–7)	18 – B. Curtis	11 – L. Alexander	5 – L. Alexander	Lakefront Arena (454); New Orleans, LA
February 17, 2024; 1:00 p.m., ESPN+		McNeese	W 81–67	12–13 (6–7)	21 – B. Curtis	14 – L. Alexander	5 – D. Craig	Stopher Gymnasium (511); Thibodaux, LA
February 22, 2024; 6:30 p.m., ESPN+		Incarnate Word	L 47–52	12–14 (6–8)	13 – L. Alexander	9 – L. Alexander	3 – K. Hamilton	Stopher Gymnasium (433); Thibodaux, LA
February 24, 2024; 1:00 p.m., ESPN+		Texas A&M–Commerce	W 89–77	13–14 (7–8)	28 – L. Alexander	15 – L. Alexander	7 – K. Hamilton	Stopher Gymnasium (433); Thibodaux, LA
February 29, 2024; 6:30 p.m., ESPN+		at Northwestern State	L 47–55	13–15 (7–9)	16 – L. Alexander	14 – L. Alexander	3 – K. Hamilton	Prather Coliseum (703); Natchitoches, LA
March 2, 2024; 1:00 p.m., ESPN+		at McNeese	L 76–78	13–16 (7–10)	18 – K. Hamilton	8 – D. Brister	6 – K. Hamilton	The Legacy Center (1,321); Lake Charles, LA
March 7, 2024; 12:00 p.m., ESPN+		at Southeastern Louisiana	L 62–68	13–17 (7–11)	20 – L. Alexander	9 – L. Alexander	3 – K. Hamilton	Pride Roofing University Center (779); Hammond, LA
2024 Jersey Mike's Subs Southland Conference tournament
March 11, 2024; 1:30 p.m., ESPN+	(7)	vs. (6) New Orleans; First round	W 73–66	14–17	19 – M. Etienne	10 – L. Alexander	7 – K. Hamilton	The Legacy Center; Lake Charles, LA
March 12, 2024; 1:30 p.m., ESPN+	(7)	vs. (3) Southeastern Louisiana; Second round	L 57–75	14–18	14 – L. Alexander	9 – K. Hamilton	5 – K. Hamilton	The Legacy Center; Lake Charles, LA
*Non-conference game. ^{#}Rankings from AP poll. (#) Tournament seedings in parentheses. All times are in Central.

== Conference awards and honors ==
=== Weekly awards ===
Weekly honors
Honors	Player	Position	Date awarded	Ref.
SLC Women's Basketball Player of the Week	Lexi Alexander	F	February 26, 2024	

== See also ==
- 2023–24 Nicholls Colonels men's basketball team
