= 2023–24 Northwestern State Lady Demons basketball team =

Intercollegiate basketball season

2023–24 Northwestern State Lady Demons basketball
- Conference: Southland Conference
- Record: 11–19 (7–11 Southland)
- Head coach: Anna Nimz (4th season)
- Assistant coaches: Leasa Ailshie; Mike Brown; Addae Houston
- Home arena: Prather Coliseum (Capacity: 3,900)

2023–24 Southland Conference women's basketball standings
	Conf.				Overall
Team	W		L	PCT	W		L	PCT
Lamar	17	–	1	.944	24	–	7	.774
Texas A&M–Corpus Christi †	14	–	4	.778	23	–	9	.719
Southeastern Louisiana	14	–	4	.778	19	–	12	.613
Incarnate Word	12	–	6	.667	19	–	11	.633
Texas A&M–Commerce*	8	–	10	.444	15	–	16	.484
New Orleans	8	–	10	.444	11	–	19	.367
Nicholls	7	–	11	.389	14	–	18	.438
Northwestern State	7	–	11	.389	11	–	19	.367
McNeese	2	–	16	.111	6	–	25	.194
Houston Christian	1	–	17	.056	6	–	23	.207
† 2024 Southland tournament winner * ineligible for the 2024 NCAA tournament due to transition from Division II.

The 2023–24 Northwestern State Lady Demons basketball team represented Northwestern State University during the 2023–24 NCAA Division I women's basketball season. The Demons, led by fourth-year head coach Anna Nimz, played their home games at Prather Coliseum in Natchitoches, Louisiana and were members of the Southland Conference.

They compiled an 11–19 overall record and a 7–11 record in conference play. Their season ended with a 57–65 loss to Texas A&M–Commerce in the first round of the SLC tournament.

== Media ==
Home games were broadcast on ESPN+.

== Preseason polls ==
=== Southland Conference Poll ===
The Southland Conference released its preseason poll on October 10, 2023. Receiving 65 overall votes, the Lady Demons were picked to finish seventh in the conference.

Predicted finish	Team	Votes (1st place)
1	Southeastern Louisiana	159 (15)
2	Texas A&M–Corpus Christi	140 (3)
3	Lamar	132 (2)
4	Incarnate Word	97
T5	Houston Christian	74
T5	McNeese	74
7	Northwestern State	65
8	Texas A&M–Commerce	58
9	New Orleans	56
10	Nicholls	39

=== Preseason All Conference ===
No Lady Demons were selected to a Preseason All Conference team.

== Roster ==
2023–24 Northwestern State Demons women's basketball team
Players
Coaches

Pos.	#	Name	Height	Year	Hometown
G	1	Jermesha Frierson	5 ft 7 in (1.7 m)	Fr	Shreveport, LA
G	3	Jiselle Woodson	5 ft 5 in (1.65 m)	Sr	Corner, AL
G	4	Karmelah Dean	5 ft 7 in (1.7 m)	Sr	Seattle, WA
F	5	Jenny Ntambwe	6 ft 1 in (1.85 m)	So	Coon Rapids, MN
G	10	Ivona Miljanic	6 ft 0 in (1.83 m)	So	Belgrade, Serbia
F	11	Jasmin Dixon	6 ft 3 in (1.91 m)	Jr	Spring, TX
G	15	Carla Celaya	5 ft 11 in (1.8 m)	So	Montbau, Spain
G	20	Jordan McLemore	5 ft 11 in (1.8 m)	Jr	Shreveport, LA
G	21	Mykaila Pickard	5 ft 10 in (1.78 m)	Jr	Anchorage, AK
G	22	Jordan Brown	5 ft 9 in (1.75 m)	RS So	Plainsboro, NJ
C	24	Jordan Todd	6 ft 1 in (1.85 m)	Sr	Eagle River, AK
G	25	Nia Hardison	5 ft 8 in (1.73 m)	Jr	Natchitoches, LA
C	31	Ane Astarloa	6 ft 3 in (1.91 m)	Fr	Berriz, Spain
C	32	Madison Moles	6 ft 6 in (1.98 m)	So	Fresno, CA
G	33	Niaisya Ervin	5 ft 10 in (1.78 m)	Jr	Newark, NJ
G	35	Sharna Ayres	5 ft 10 in (1.78 m)	Sr	Melbourne, Australia

Head coach

- Anna Nimz (Pittsburg State)

Assistant coach(es)

- Leasa Ailshie (Sam Houston State)
- Mike Brown (Drake)
- Addae Houston (Northwest Missouri State University)

Legend

- (C) Team captain
- (S) Suspended
- (I) Ineligible
- (W) Walk-on
- Injured
- Current redshirt

Roster
Last update: April 28, 2026

== Schedule ==
Date time, TV	Rank^{#}	Opponent^{#}	Result	Record	High points	High rebounds	High assists	Site (attendance) city, state
Non-conference regular season
November 6, 2023*; 12:00 p.m., B1G+		at Nebraska	L 42–90	0–1	13 – K. Dean	7 – S. Ayres	2 – K. Dean	Pinnacle Bank Arena (7,065); Lincoln, NE
November 8, 2023; 6:30 p.m., ESPN+		at Kansas	L 46–88	0–2	10 – N. Ervin	4 – J. Dixon	1 – N. Ervin	Allen Fieldhouse (2,954); Manhattan, KS
November 12, 2023*; 2:00 p.m., ESPN+		at Tulsa	L 53–65	0–3	15 – S. Ayres	6 – N. Hardison	2 – J. Woodson	Reynolds Center (1,003); Tulsa, OK
November 22, 2023*; 6:30 p.m., ESPN+		Grambling	L 59–64	0–4	17 – S. Ayres	8 – J. Ntambwe	5 – J. Woodson	Prather Coliseum (387); Natchitoches, LA
November 25, 2023*; 1:00 p.m., ESPN+		Arkansas Baptist	W 82–41	1–4	16 – J. Ntambwe;	8 – J. Ntambwe	5 – J. Woodson	Prather Coliseum (101); Natchitoches, LA
November 28, 2023*; 6:30 p.m., ESPN+		SUNO	W 105–38	2–4	18 – C. Celaya	12 – C. Celaya	9 – J. Woodson	Prather Coliseum (379); Natchitoches, LA
December 3, 2023*; 6:30 p.m., ESPN+		at Southern	W 46–35	3–4	17 – J. Woodson	8 – C. Celaya	4 – C. Celaya	F. G. Clark Center (551); Baton Rouge, LA
December 6, 2023*; 5:00 p.m., ESPN+		Tarleton State; Rescheduled from November 16	W 59–51	4–4	11 – T. Da Silva	6 – E. Turrubiates	2 – N. Sanders	Prather Coliseum (135); Natchitoches, LA
December 12, 2023*; 6:30 p.m., ESPN+		at Louisiana–Monroe	L 60–76	4–5	22 – S. Ayers	9 – J. Ntambwe	5 – K. Dean	Fant–Ewing Coliseum (247); Monroe, LA
December 17, 2023*; 2:00 p.m., SECN+		at No. 7 LSU	L 36–81	4–6	10 – S. Ayres	5 – S. Ayres	3 – J. Woodson	Pete Maravich Assembly Center (11,432); Baton Rouge, LA
December 20, 2023*; 1:00 p.m., ESPN+		at Central Arkansas; Rescheduled from November 18	L 57–75	4–7	16 – J. Ntambwe	4 – 3 tied	2 – K. Dean	Farris Center (389); Conway, AR
Exhibition
December 30, 2023*; 1:00 p.m.		Champion Christian	W 75–39	–	27 – K. Dean	6 – J. Dixon	6 – N. Hardison	Prather Coliseum (97); Natchitoches, LA
Southland Conference regular season
January 4, 2023; 6:30 p.m., ESPN+		McNeese	W 78–54	5–7 (1–0)	16 – S. Ayres	8 – K. Dean	5 – J. Woodson	Prather Coliseum (494); Natchitoches, LA
January 6, 2023; 3:00 p.m., ESPN+		at Lamar	L 56–73	5–8 (1–1)	16 – K. Dean	7 – J. Todd	6 – J. Woodson	Neches Arena (1,367); Beaumont, TX
January 11, 2023; 6:30 p.m., ESPN+		Houston Christian	W 63–61	6–8 (2–1)	19 – J. Ntambwe	7 – J. Dixon	5 – K. Dean	Prather Coliseum (824); Natchitoches, LA
January 13, 2023; 1:00 p.m., ESPN+		Incarnate Word	L 57–63	6–9 (2–2)	12 – K. Dean	6 – J. Woodson	4 – J. Woodson	Prather Coliseum (411); Natchitoches, LA
January 18, 2023; 6:00 p.m., ESPN+		at Southeastern Louisiana	L 48–55	6–10 (2–3)	17 – K. Dean	6 – K. Dean	3 – J. Woodson	Pride Roofing University Center (1,012); Hammond, LA
January 20, 2023; 1:00 p.m., ESPN+		at New Orleans	W 72–43	7–10 (3–3)	19 – J. Woodson	10 – S. Ayres	8 – K. Dean	Lakefront Arena (488); New Orleans, LA
January 25, 2023; 7:00 p.m., ESPN+		at McNeese	W 60–44	8–10 (4–3)	18 – N. Hardison	6 – J. Woodson	6 – J. Woodson	The Legacy Center (1,774); Lake Charles, LA
January 27, 2023; 1:00 p.m., ESPN+		Texas A&M–Corpus Christi	L 45–50	8–11 (4–4)	14 – J. Woodson	12 – S. Ayres	3 – K. Dean	Prather Coliseum; Natchitoches, LA
February 1, 2023; 6:30 p.m., ESPN+		at Nicholls	L 57–60	8–12 (4–5)	14 – J. Todd	7 – J. Todd	4 – K. Dean	Stopher Gymnasium (412); Thibodaux, LA
February 3, 2023; 1:00 p.m., ESPN+		Texas A&M–Commerce	W 69–66	9–12 (5–5)	16 – J. Ntambwe	13 – S. Ayres	4 – K. Dean	Prather Coliseum (937); Natchitoches, LA
February 8, 2023; 6:30 p.m., ESPN+		New Orleans	L 57–80	9–13 (5–6)	22 – K. Dean	8 – J. Ntambwe	3 – K. Dean	Prather Coliseum (784); Natchitoches, LA
February 10, 2023; 1:00 p.m., ESPN+		Southeastern Louisiana	L 51–59	9–14 (5–7)	– S. Ayres	– S. Ayres	– K. Dean	Prather Coliseum (803); Natchitoches, LA
February 15, 2023; 7:00 p.m., ESPN+		at Texas A&M–Corpus Christ	L 52–68	9–15 (5–8)	13 – S. Ayres	15 – J. Todd	5 – N. Hardison	American Bank Center (702); Corpus Christi, TX
February 17, 2023; 2:00 p.m., ESPN+		at Incarnate Word	L 45–53	9–16 (5–9)	20 – N. De Leon Negron	8 – N. De Leon Negron	4 – N. De Leon Negron	McDermott Center (110); San Antonio, TX
February 24, 2023; 1:00 p.m., ESPN+		at Houston Christian	W 64–55	10–16 (6–9)	24 – S. Ayres	5 – J. Ntambwe	3 – K. Dean	Sharp Gymnasium (245); Houston, TX
February 29, 2023; 6:30 p.m., ESPN+		Nicholls	W 55–47	11–16 (7–9)	15 – J. Woodson	10 – J. Woodson	2 – J. Woodson	Prather Coliseum (703); Natchitoches, LA
March 2, 2023; 1:00 p.m., ESPN+		Lamar	L 64–80	11–17 (7–10)	19 – K. Dean	6 – J. Woodson	5 – J. Woodson	Prather Coliseum (840); Natchitoches, LA
March 6, 2023; 5:00 p.m., ESPN+		at Texas A&M–Commerce	L 58–69	11–18 (7–11)	16 – S. Ayres	7 – S. Ayres	5 – J. Woodson	The Field House (489); Commerce, TX
2024 Jersey Mike's Subs Southland Conference Tournament
March 11, 2024; 11:30 a.m., ESPN+	(8)	vs. (5) Texas A&M–Commerce; First round	L 57–65	11–19	17 – J. Woodson	12 – S. Ayres	4 – J. Woodson	The Legacy Center; Lake Charles, LA
*Non-conference game. ^{#}Rankings from AP poll. (#) Tournament seedings in parentheses. All times are in Central.

== See also ==
- 2023–24 Northwestern State Demons basketball team
