= 2023–24 Texas A&M–Corpus Christi Islanders women's basketball team =

Intercollegiate basketball season

2023–24 Texas A&M–Corpus Christi Islanders women's basketball

Southland Conference tournament champions

NCAA tournament, first round
- Conference: Southland Conference
- Record: 23–9 (14–4 Southland)
- Head coach: Royce Chadwick (12th season)
- Assistant coaches: Roxanne White; Darren Brunson; Gee Lawler
- Home arena: American Bank Center; Dugan Wellness Center

2023–24 Southland Conference women's basketball standings
	Conf.				Overall
Team	W		L	PCT	W		L	PCT
Lamar	17	–	1	.944	24	–	7	.774
Texas A&M–Corpus Christi †	14	–	4	.778	23	–	9	.719
Southeastern Louisiana	14	–	4	.778	19	–	12	.613
Incarnate Word	12	–	6	.667	19	–	11	.633
Texas A&M–Commerce*	8	–	10	.444	15	–	16	.484
New Orleans	8	–	10	.444	11	–	19	.367
Nicholls	7	–	11	.389	14	–	18	.438
Northwestern State	7	–	11	.389	11	–	19	.367
McNeese	2	–	16	.111	6	–	25	.194
Houston Christian	1	–	17	.056	6	–	23	.207
† 2024 Southland tournament winner * ineligible for the 2024 NCAA tournament due to transition from Division II.

The 2023–24 Texas A&M–Corpus Christi Islanders women's basketball team represented Texas A&M University–Corpus Christi in the 2023–24 NCAA Division I women's basketball season. The Islanders were led by twelfth-year head coach Royce Chadwick, and played their home games at the American Bank Center and the Dugan Wellness Center, as members of the Southland Conference.

== Media ==
Home games were broadcast on ESPN+. Video streaming of all non-televised home games and audio for all road games was available at GoIslanders.com.

== Preseason polls ==
=== Southland Conference poll ===
The Southland Conference released its preseason poll on October 10, 2023. Receiving 140 overall votes and three first-place votes, the Islanders were picked to finish second in the conference.

Predicted finish	Team	Votes (1st place)
1	Southeastern Louisiana	159 (15)
2	Texas A&M–Corpus Christi	140 (3)
3	Lamar	132 (2)
4	Incarnate Word	97
T5	Houston Christian	74
T5	McNeese	74
7	Northwestern State	65
8	Texas A&M–Commerce	58
9	New Orleans	56
10	Nicholls	39

=== Preseason All Conference ===
Graduate student Alecia Westbrook, a forward/center, was selected to the Preseason All Conference first team. Senior Paige Allen, a guard, was selected to the second team.

== Roster ==
2023–24 Texas A&M–Corpus Christi Islanders women's basketball team
Players
Coaches

Pos.	#	Name	Height	Year	Hometown
G	2	Timberlin Criswell	5 ft 7 in (1.7 m)	Jr	Manvel, TX
G	3	Jaeda Whitner	5 ft 5 in (1.65 m)	Jr	Mason City, IA
G	10	Andrea Montesinos	5 ft 8 in (1.73 m)	Fr	Valencia, Spain
G	11	Paige Allen	5 ft 8 in (1.73 m)	Sr	Kansas City, MO
F/C	13	Alecia Westbrook	6 ft 1 in (1.85 m)	GS	Kansas City, MO
C	14	Bruna Anguera	6 ft 2 in (1.88 m)	So	El Morell, Spain
G	15	Sasha Shishkina	5 ft 8 in (1.73 m)	Sr	Moscow, Russia
C	20	Torie Sevier	6 ft 4 in (1.93 m)	RS Fr	Aubrey, TX
G	21	Maya Ellis	5 ft 8 in (1.73 m)	Jr	Chesterfield, VA
F	22	Claudia Diez	6 ft 3 in (1.91 m)	Fr	Valencia, Spain
G	24	Violeta Verano	5 ft 9 in (1.75 m)	Sr	Barcelona, Spain
G	25	Mireia Aguado	5 ft 9 in (1.75 m)	Sr	Barcelona, Spain
G	30	Annukka Willstedt	5 ft 9 in (1.75 m)	Jr	Torrelodones, Spain
F	32	Nabaweeya McGill	6 ft 2 in (1.88 m)	Sr	Tampa, FL

Head coach

- Royce Chadwick (Southwestern Oklahoma State)

Assistant coach(es)

- Roxanne White (Stephen F. Austin)
- Darren Brunson (St. Mary's (TX))
- Gee Lawler (Texas A&M–Corpus Christi)

Legend

- (C) Team captain
- (S) Suspended
- (I) Ineligible
- (W) Walk-on
- Injured
- Current redshirt

Roster
Last update: April 6, 2024

== Schedule and results ==
Date time, TV	Rank^{#}	Opponent^{#}	Result	Record	High points	High rebounds	High assists	Site (attendance) city, state
Non-conference regular season
November 7, 2023*; 5:00 p.m., ESPN+		St. Thomas (TX)	W 79–41	1–0	11 – N. McGill	9 – N. McGill	5 – V. Verano	Dugan Wellness Center (1,179); Corpus Christi, TX
November 9, 2023*; 6:00 p.m., SECN+		at Texas A&M	L 50–73	1–1	12 – M. Aguado	7 – B. Anguera	4 – V. Verano	Reed Arena (3,057); College Station, TX
November 13, 2023*; 5:00 p.m., ESPN+		Schreiner	W 92–40	2–1	16 – A. Westbrook	9 – A. Westbrook	4 – A. Westbrook	Dugan Wellness Center (682); Corpus Christi, TX
November 15, 2023*; 7:00 p.m., ESPN+		UTSA	L 59–66 ^{OT}	2–2	17 – A. Westbrook	8 – A. Westbrook	5 – A. Westbrook	Dugan Wellness Center (779); Corpus Christi, TX
November 21, 2023*; 6:00 p.m., ESPN+		at Santa Clara	L 54–75	2–3	17 – T. Sevier	6 – B. Anguera	2 – M. Aguado	Leavey Center (206); Santa Clara, CA
November 26, 2023*; 1:00 p.m., ESPN+		Texas State	W 60–52	3–3	17 – Criswell	9 – Westbrook	4 – Criswell	American Bank Center (781); Corpus Christi, TX
December 2, 2023*; 1:00 p.m., ESPN+		Rice	L 56–84	3–4	10 – T. Criswell	8 – N. McGill	3 – P. Allen	Dugan Wellness Center (824); Corpus Christ, TX
December 5, 2023*; 7:00 p.m., ESPN+		UT Rio Grande Valley; South Texas Showdown	W 69–46	4–4	12 – N. McGill	13 – A. Westbrook	4 – A. Westbrook	American Bank Center (1,363); Corpus Christi, TX
December 14, 2023*; 6:30 p.m., ESPN+		at UT Rio Grande Valley; South Texas Showdown	W 57–51	5–4	11 – V. Verano	8 – V. Westbrook	4 – V. Verano	UTRGV Fieldhouse (718); Edinburg, TX
December 19, 2023*; 11:00 p.m., ESPN+		Our Lady of the Lake	W 77–33	6–4	13 – A. Westbrook	7 – A. Westbrook	6 – A. Westbrook	Dugan Wellness Center (1,400); Corpus Christi, TX
December 30, 2023*; 1:00 p.m., ESPN+		Concordia	W 76–45	7–4	10 – V. Verano	5 – V. Verano	6 – T. Criswell	Dugan Wellness Center (856); Corpus Christi, TX
Southland Conference regular season
January 3, 2024; 7:00 p.m., ESPN+		Houston Christian	W 73–49	8–4 (1–0)	15 – P. Allen	9 – P. Allen	5 – M. Aguado	American Bank Center (678); Corpus Christi, TX
January 6, 2024; 2:00 p.m., ESPN+		at Incarnate Word	W 63–61	9–4 (2–0)	27 – A. Westbrook	10 – M. Aguado	3 – A. Westbrook	McDermott Center; San Antonio, TX
January 11, 2024; 6:00 p.m., ESPN+		at Southeastern Louisiana	L 58–61	9–5 (2–1)	16 – A. Westbrook	11 – A. Westbrook	2 – A. Wilstedt	Pride Roofing University Center (692); Hammond, LA
January 13, 2024; 2:00 p.m., ESPN+		at New Orleans	W 61–54	10–5 (3–1)	15 – M. Aguado	N. McGill – 12	3 – M. Aguado	Lakefront Arena (492); New Orleans, LA
January 18, 2024; 7:00 p.m., ESPN+		McNeese	W 83–63	11–5 (4–1)	12 – A. Westbrook	11 – A. Westbrook	4 – A. Aguado	American Bank Center (818); Corpus Christi, TX
January 20, 2024; 1:00 p.m., ESPN+		Nicholls	W 58–52	12–5 (5–1)	13 – tied (3)	10 – P. Allen	2 – tied (2)	American Bank Center (1,247); Corpus Christi, TX
January 25, 2024; 6:30 p.m., ESPN+		at Texas A&M–Commerce	W 69–58	13–5 (6–1)	15 – T. Criswell	13 – A. Westrbook	5 – T. Criswell	The Field House (382); Commerce, TX
January 27, 2024; 1:00 p.m., ESPN+		at Northwestern State	W 50–45	14–5 (7–1)	21 – M. Aguado	9 – A. Westbrook	2 – P. Allen	Prather Coliseum (412); Natchitoches, LA
February 3, 2024; 1:00 p.m., ESPN+		Lamar	L 57–63	14–6 (7–2)	22 – M. Aguado	9 – P. Allen	3 – P. Allen	American Bank Center (1,927); Corpus Christi, TX
February 8, 2024; 6:30 p.m., ESPN+		at Nicholls	L 67–70	14–7 (7–3)	18 – A. Westbrook	7 – A. Westbrook	4 – M. Aguado	Stopher Gymnasium (458); Thibodaux, LA
February 10, 2024; 1:00 p.m., ESPN+		at McNeese	W 78–64	15–7 (8–3)	18 – P. Allen	10 – P. Allen	4 – M. Aguado	The Legacy Center (1,104); Lake Charles, LA
February 15, 2024; 7:00 p.m., ESPN+		Northwestern State	W 68–52	16–7 (9–3)	15 – M. Aguado	6 – A. Westbrook	4 – M. Aguado	American Bank Center (702); Corpus Christi, TX
February 17, 2024; 1:00 p.m., ESPN+		Texas A&M–Commerce	W 86–69	17–7 (10–3)	25 – M. Ellis	18 – P. Allen	12 – M. Agaudo	American Bank Center (835); Corpus Christi, TX
February 22, 2024; 6:00 p.m., ESPN+		at Houston Christian	W 68–42	18–7 (11–3)	16 – A. Westbrook	8 – A. Willstedt	4 – A. Willstedt	Sharp Gymnasium (280); Houston, TX
February 24, 2024; 3:00 p.m., ESPN+		at Lamar	L 63–68	18–8 (11–4)	14 – A. Westbrook	7 – A. Westbrook	6 – V. Verano	Neches Arena (1,862); Beaumont, TX
February 29, 2024; 7:00 p.m., ESPN+		New Orleans	W 81–54	19–8 (12–4)	18 – A. Aguado	12 – P. Allen	7 – A. Westbrook	American Bank Center (851); Corpus Christi, TX
March 2, 2024; 1:00 p.m., ESPN+		Southeastern Louisiana	W 79–73 ^{OT}	20–8 (13–4)	18 – N. McGill	10 – P. Allen	7 – M. Aguado	American Bank Center (1,352); Corpus Christi, TX
March 6, 2024; 5:00 p.m., ESPN+		Incarnate Word	W 65–43	21–8 (14–4)	14 – N. McGill	9 – M. Aguado	7 – A. Westbrook	American Bank Center (1,744); Corpus Christi, TX
2024 Jersey Mike's Subs Southland Conference tournament
March 13, 2024; 1:30 p.m., ESPN+	(2)	vs. (3) Southeastern Louisiana; Semifinals	W 60–59	22–8	16 – M. Aguado	10 – A. Westbrook	3 – tied (2)	The Legacy Center; Lake Charles, LA
March 14, 2024; 4:00 p.m., ESPNU	(2)	vs. (1) Lamar; Championship	W 68–61	23–8	22 – P. Allen	12 – P. Allen	6 – V. Verano	The Legacy Center (700); Lake Charles, LA
2024 NCAA Division I women's basketball tournament
March 23, 2024*; 3:30 p.m., ESPN	(16 P3)	at (1 P3) No. 3 USC; First round	L 55–87	23–9	15 – M. Aguado	9 – P. Allen	5 – V. Verano	Galen Center (8,386); Los Angeles, CA
*Non-conference game. ^{#}Rankings from AP poll. (#) Tournament seedings in parentheses. P3=Portland 3. All times are in Central.

== See also ==
- 2023–24 Texas A&M–Corpus Christi Islanders men's basketball team
