= 2023–24 Texas A&M–Commerce Lions women's basketball team =

NCAA Division I women's basketball season

2023–24 Texas A&M–Commerce Lions women's basketball
- Conference: Southland Conference
- Record: 15–16 (8–10 Southland)
- Head coach: Valerie King (1st season)
- Assistant coaches: Tad Wedel; Brechelle Beachum; Trevor Moyer; Jaedyn De La Cerda
- Home arena: Texas A&M–Commerce Field House

2023–24 Southland Conference women's basketball standings
	Conf.				Overall
Team	W		L	PCT	W		L	PCT
Lamar	17	–	1	.944	24	–	7	.774
Texas A&M–Corpus Christi †	14	–	4	.778	23	–	9	.719
Southeastern Louisiana	14	–	4	.778	19	–	12	.613
Incarnate Word	12	–	6	.667	19	–	11	.633
Texas A&M–Commerce*	8	–	10	.444	15	–	16	.484
New Orleans	8	–	10	.444	11	–	19	.367
Nicholls	7	–	11	.389	14	–	18	.438
Northwestern State	7	–	11	.389	11	–	19	.367
McNeese	2	–	16	.111	6	–	25	.194
Houston Christian	1	–	17	.056	6	–	23	.207
† 2024 Southland tournament winner * ineligible for the 2024 NCAA tournament due to transition from Division II.

The 2023–24 Texas A&M–Commerce Lions women's basketball team represented Texas A&M University–Commerce in the 2023–24 NCAA Division I women's basketball season. The Lions, led by first-year head coach Valerie King, played their home games at Texas A&M–Commerce Field House in Commerce, Texas, as members of the Southland Conference (SLC). They compiled a 15–16 overall record and an 8–10 record in conference play. Their season ended with a semifinal loss to Lamar in the SLC tournament.

This season marked Texas A&M–Commerce's second year of a four-year transition period from Division II to Division I. As a result, the Lions were not eligible for NCAA postseason play until the 2026–27 season.

== Media ==
Home games were broadcast on ESPN+.

== Preseason polls ==
=== Southland Conference poll ===
The Southland Conference released its preseason poll on October 10, 2023. Receiving 58 overall votes, the Lions were picked to finish eighth in the conference.

Predicted finish	Team	Votes (1st place)
1	Southeastern Louisiana	159 (15)
2	Texas A&M–Corpus Christi	140 (3)
3	Lamar	132 (2)
4	Incarnate Word	97
T5	Houston Christian	74
T5	McNeese	74
7	Northwestern State	65
8	Texas A&M–Commerce	58
9	New Orleans	56
10	Nicholls	39

=== Preseason All-Conference ===
No Texas A&M–Commerce players were selected to the Preseason All-Conference teams.

== Roster ==
2023–24 Texas A&M–Commerce Lions women's basketball team
Players
Coaches

Pos.	#	Name	Height	Year	Hometown
G	0	Cova Horvath	5 ft 7 in (1.7 m)	So	Oberwart, Austria
G	1	Dorian Norris	5 ft 11 in (1.8 m)	Jr	Lake Dallas, TX
G	2	Jordyn Newsome	5 ft 8 in (1.73 m)	Jr	Irving, TX
G	3	Mia Deck	5 ft 6 in (1.68 m)	Sr	Frisco, TX
G/F	4	Jamy De Kock	5 ft 11 in (1.8 m)	Jr	Woudrichem, Netherlands
G	10	Ahmya Boyce	5 ft 6 in (1.68 m)	Jr	Newport News, VA
G	11	DaLonna Choice	5 ft 6 in (1.68 m)	So	Mesquite, TX
G	12	Mary Delgado	5 ft 8 in (1.73 m)	Sr	Miami, FL
G	14	Lucia Hervia	5 ft 11 in (1.8 m)	Fr	Almería, Spain
G/F	20	Olivia Russell	5 ft 11 in (1.8 m)	Sr	Auburn Hills, MI
F	21	Jasmine Payne	6 ft 0 in (1.83 m)	Jr	Montgomery, AL
G	24	Jada Hood	5 ft 6 in (1.68 m)	Sr	Roseville, MN
F	30	Jordyn Beaty	6 ft 0 in (1.83 m)	Jr	Woodville, TX
F	32	Harper Biley	6 ft 1 in (1.85 m)	Fr	Cypress, TX

Head coach

- Valerie King (Cincinnati)

Assistant coach(es)

- Tad Wedel (Kansas)
- Brechelle Beachum (Illinois State)
- Trevor Moyer (Saint Mary)/(Oklahoma State)
- Jaedyn De La Cerda (New Mexico)

Legend

- (C) Team captain
- (S) Suspended
- (I) Ineligible
- (W) Walk-on
- Injured
- Current redshirt

Roster
Last update: February 20, 2024

== Schedule and results ==
Date time, TV	Rank^{#}	Opponent^{#}	Result	Record	High points	High rebounds	High assists	Site (attendance) city, state
Non-conference regular season
November 6, 2023*; 5:00 p.m., ESPN+		LeTourneau	W 96–41	1–0	24 – J. Newsome	6 – J. De Kock	5 – M. Deck	The Field House (458); Commerce, TX
November 10, 2023*; 5:00 p.m., ESPN+		UNT Dallas	W 80–56	2–0	21 – M. Delgado	9 – D. Norris	4 – J. Newsome	The Field House (257); Commerce, TX
November 15, 2023*; 8:00 p.m.		at New Mexico	L 74–75	2–1	19 – M. Delgado	7 – J. Payne	4 – J. De Kock	The Pit (4,718); Albuquerque, NM
November 17, 2023*; 6:00 p.m., ESPN+		at Texas Tech	L 45–91	2–2	16 – A. Boyce	5 – D. Norris	1 – A. Boyce	United Supermarkets Arena (4,802); Lubbock, TX
November 20, 2023*; 1:00 p.m., ESPN+		Utah Tech	W 84–75	3–2	19 – M. Delgado	13 – M. Deck	4 – M. Delgado	The Field House (219); Commerce, TX
November 29, 2023*; 9:00 p.m.		at Washington State	L 50–111	3–3	17 – Deck	5 – Deck	1 – Horvath	Beasley Coliseum (805); Pullman, WA
December 1, 2023*; 8:00 p.m., ESPN+		at Idaho	W 72–71	4–3	18 – M. Deck	13 – M. Deck	4 – M. Deck	Idaho Central Credit Union Arena (1,049); Moscow, ID
December 5, 2023*; 6:30 p.m., ESPN+		Southern Utah	W 73–67	5–3	17 – A. Boyce	10 – M. Delgado	3 – M. Delgado	The Field House (345); Commerce, TX
December 8, 2023*; 7:00 p.m., ESPN+		Houston	L 53–86	5–4	14 – M. Delgado	10 – M. Delgado	4 – M. Delgado	The Field House (1,189); Commerce, TX
December 18, 2023*; 1:30 p.m., ESPN+		Champion Christian	Cancelled					The Field House; Commerce, TX
December 31, 2023*; 2:00 p.m., SECN+		at Texas A&M	L 63–87	5–5	14 – M. Deck	6 – J. Newsome	3 – M. Deck	Reed Arena (4,039); College Station, TX
Southland Conference regular season
January 4, 2024; 6:30 p.m., ESPN+		at New Orleans	L 78–88	5–6 (0–1)	23 – M. Deck	10 – M. Deck	10 – M. Delgado	Lakefront Arena (521); New Orleans, LA
January 6, 2024; 3:30 p.m., ESPN+		McNeese	W 87–78	6–6 (1–1)	23 – M. Deck	14 – O. Russell	6 – M. Delgado	The Field House (572); Commerce, TX
January 11, 2024; 6:30 p.m., ESPN+		Incarnate Word	L 62–70	6–7 (1–2)	20 – M. Deck	9 – M. Delgado	3 – tied (2)	The Field House (238); Commerce, TX
January 13, 2024; 3:30 p.m., ESPN+		Houston Christian	W 63–53	7–7 (2–2)	14 – A. Boyce	9 – J. Beatty	4 – tied (2)	The Field House (241); Commerce, TX
January 18, 2024; 6:00 p.m., ESPN+		at Lamar	W 73–70	8–7 (3–2)	27 – A. Boyce	9 – J. Beaty	4 – A. Boyce	Neches Arena (824); Beaumont, TX
January 20, 2024; 1:00 p.m., ESPN+		at Southeastern Louisiana	L 49–65	8–8 (3–3)	14 – D. Norris	9 – D. Norris	3 – M. Deck	Pride Roofing University Center (721); Hammond, LA
January 25, 2024; 6:30 p.m., ESPN+		Texas A&M–Corpus Christi	L 58–69	8–9 (3–4)	13 – J. Newsome	12 – J. Beaty	4 – C. Horvath	The Field House (382); Commerce, TX
January 27, 2024; 3:30 p.m., ESPN+		Nicholls	W 71–67	9–9 (4–4)	20 – M. Deck	10 – O. Russell	4 – J. Newsome	The Field House (412); Commerce, TX
February 1, 2024; 7:00 p.m., ESPN+		at McNeese	W 94–70	10–9 (5–4)	22 – M. Deck	11 – J. Payne	6 – A. Boyce	The Legacy Center (1,687); Lake Charles, LA
February 3, 2024; 1:00 p.m., ESPN+		at Northwestern State	L 66–69	10–10 (5–5)	27 – J. Newsome	11 – J. Beaty	3 – C. Horvath	Prather Coliseum (937); Natchitoches, LA
February 8, 2024; 6:30 p.m., ESPN+		Southeastern Louisiana	L 61–72	10–11 (5–6)	17 – M. Deck	12 – J. Beaty	3 – J. Beaty	The Field House (313); Commerce, TX
February 10, 2024; 3:30 p.m., ESPN+		New Orleans	W 67–63 ^{OT}	11–11 (6–6)	26 – A. Boyce	16 – O. Russell	3 – A. Boyce	The Field House; Commerce, TX
February 15, 2024; 6:30 p.m., ESPN+		at Incarnate Word	L 61–72	11–12 (6–7)	21 – M. Delgado	7 – J. Beaty	3 – M. Delgado	McDermott Center (104); San Antonio, TX
February 17, 2024; 1:00 p.m., ESPN+		at Texas A&M–Corpus Christi	L 69–86	11–13 (6–8)	24 – J. Newsome	8 – J. Payne	4 – J. Newson	American Bank Center (835); Corpus Christi, TX
February 24, 2024; 1:00 p.m., ESPN+		at Nicholls	L 77–89	11–14 (6–9)	14 – J. Hood	11 – J. Beaty	7 – A. Boyce	Stopher Gymnasium (433); Thibodaux, LA
February 29, 2024; 6:30 p.m., ESPN+		Lamar	L 58–70	11–15 (6–10)	18 – J. Newsome	4 – J. Newsome	4 – A. Boyce	The Field House (472); Commerce, TX
March 2, 2024; 1:00 p.m., ESPN+		at Houston Christian	W 78–63	12–15 (7–10)	27 – M. Deck	13 – M. Deck	7 – A. Boyce	Sharp Gymnasium (259); Houston, TX
March 6, 2024; 5:00 p.m., ESPN+		Northwestern State	W 69–58	13–15 (8–10)	22 – J. Hood	14 – J. Beaty	4 – M. Deck	The Field House (489); Commerce, TX
2024 Jersey Mike's Subs Southland Conference tournament
March 11, 2024; 11:00 a.m., ESPN+	(5)	vs. (8) Northwestern State; First round	W 65–57	14–15	20 – M. Deck	12 – J. Beaty	3 – M. Deck	The Legacy Center; Lake Charles, LA
March 12, 2024; 11:00 a.m., ESPN+	(5)	vs. (4) Incarnate Word; Second round	W 66–57	15–15	22 – M. Deck	11 – J. Beaty	2 – M. Deck	The Legacy Center; Lake Charles, LA
March 13, 2024; 11:00 a.m., ESPN+	(5)	vs. (1) Lamar; Semifinals	L 58–83	15–16	18 – J. Newsome	4 – M. Deck	4 – A. Boyce	The Legacy Center; Lake Charles, LA
*Non-conference game. ^{#}Rankings from AP poll. (#) Tournament seedings in parentheses. All times are in Central.

== Conference awards and honors ==
=== Weekly awards ===
Weekly honors
Honors	Player	Position	Date awarded	Ref.
SLC Women's Basketball Player of the Week	Mia Deck	G	December 4, 2023	
SLC Women's Basketball Player of the Week	Mary Delgado	G	December 11, 2023	

== See also ==
- 2023–24 Texas A&M–Commerce Lions men's basketball team
