= 2023–24 Houston Christian Huskies women's basketball team =

Intercollegiate basketball season

2023–24 Houston Christian Huskies women's basketball
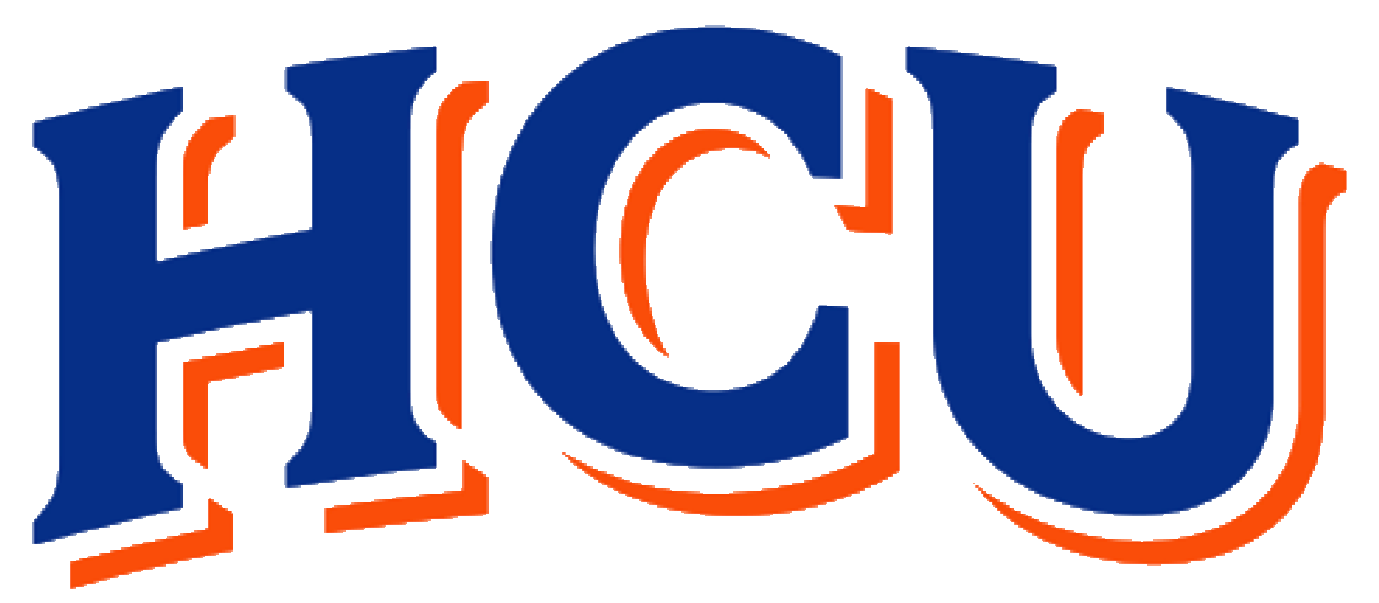
- Conference: Southland Conference
- Record: 6–23 (1–17 Southland)
- Head coach: Donna Finnie (11th season)
- Assistant coaches: Taylor Reed; Grace Daniels; Julija Vujakovic
- Home arena: Sharp Gymnasium (Capacity: 1,000)

2023–24 Southland Conference women's basketball standings
	Conf.				Overall
Team	W		L	PCT	W		L	PCT
Lamar	17	–	1	.944	24	–	7	.774
Texas A&M–Corpus Christi †	14	–	4	.778	23	–	9	.719
Southeastern Louisiana	14	–	4	.778	19	–	12	.613
Incarnate Word	12	–	6	.667	19	–	11	.633
Texas A&M–Commerce*	8	–	10	.444	15	–	16	.484
New Orleans	8	–	10	.444	11	–	19	.367
Nicholls	7	–	11	.389	14	–	18	.438
Northwestern State	7	–	11	.389	11	–	19	.367
McNeese	2	–	16	.111	6	–	25	.194
Houston Christian	1	–	17	.056	6	–	23	.207
† 2024 Southland tournament winner * ineligible for the 2024 NCAA tournament due to transition from Division II.

The 2023–24 Houston Christian Huskies women's basketball team represented Houston Christian University in the 2023–24 NCAA Division I women's basketball season. The Huskies, led by eleventh-year head coach Donna Finnie, played their home games at the Sharp Gymnasium in Houston, Texas as members of the Southland Conference.

== Media ==
Home games were broadcast on ESPN+.

== Previous season ==
The Huskies finished the 2022–23 season with a 11–18 overall record, 6–12 in Southland play, to finish in ninth place in the conference. They failed to qualify for the 2023 Southland Conference women's basketball tournament.

== Preseason polls ==
=== Southland Conference poll ===
The Southland Conference released its preseason poll on October 10, 2023. Receiving 132 overall votes and two first-place votes, the Huskies tied with McNeese to finish fifth in the conference.

== Roster ==
2023–24 Houston Christian Huskies women's basketball team
Players
Coaches

Pos.	#	Name	Height	Year	Hometown
G	0	Enya Maguire	5 ft 4 in (1.63 m)	Jr	Belfast, Northern Ireland
G	3	Erin Maguire	5 ft 7 in (1.7 m)	RS Fr	Belfast, Northern Ireland
G	5	Kennedy Wilson	5 ft 6 in (1.68 m)	Sr	Mansfield, TX
G	10	Hannah Fields	5 ft 10 in (1.78 m)	Fr	Oklahoma City, OK
F	11	Joy Oly	6 ft 0 in (1.83 m)	So	Ettelbruck, Luxembourg
F	12	Amy Cotton	6 ft 0 in (1.83 m)	Jr	North Adelaide, Australia
G	13	Tove Caesar	6 ft 1 in (1.85 m)	Fr	Stockholm, Sweden
F	14	N'Denasija Collins	6 ft 0 in (1.83 m)	Sr	Mansfield, TX
G	22	Makolla Bagayegou	5 ft 9 in (1.75 m)	Fr	Gothenburg, Sweden
G	23	Lyric Barr	6 ft 1 in (1.85 m)	Fr	Houston, TX
G	24	Cat Hursh	5 ft 9 in (1.75 m)	Sr	Katy, TX
C	25	Yasmin Butler	6 ft 5 in (1.96 m)	So	Wollongong, Australia
F	33	Riley Wells	6 ft 2 in (1.88 m)	Fr	Montgomery, OH
C	40	Elizabeth Matadi	6 ft 5 in (1.96 m)	Jr	Irving, TX

Head coach

- Donna Finnie (Heriot–Watt)

Assistant coach(es)

- Taylor Reed (Louisiana Tech)
- Grace Daniels (Texas–San Antonio)
- Julija Vujakovic

Legend

- (C) Team captain
- (S) Suspended
- (I) Ineligible
- (W) Walk-on
- Injured
- Current redshirt

Roster
Last update: July 7, 2024

== Preseason poll ==
Predicted finish	Team	Votes (1st place)
1	Southeastern Louisiana	159 (15)
2	Texas A&M–Corpus Christi	140 (3)
3	Lamar	132 (2)
4	Incarnate Word	97
T5	Houston Christian	74
T5	McNeese	74
7	Northwestern State	65
8	Texas A&M–Commerce	58
9	New Orleans	56
10	Nicholls	39

=== Preseason All-Conference ===
Senior N'Denasija Collins, a forward, was selected to the Preseason All-Conference second team.

== Schedule and results ==
Date time, TV	Rank^{#}	Opponent^{#}	Result	Record	High points	High rebounds	High assists	Site (attendance) city, state
Non-conference season
November 6, 2023*; 7:00 p.m., ESPN+		at Rice	L 38–70	0–1	13 – K. Wilson	8 – H. Fields	2 – A. Cotton	Tudor Fieldhouse (622); Houston, TX
November 11, 2023*; 6:00 p.m., ESPN+		at Sam Houston	L 65–67	0–2	23 – E. McGuire	11 – E. McGuire	6 – K. Wilson	Bernard Johnson Coliseum (533); Huntsville, TX
November 14, 2023*; 6:00 p.m., ESPN+		St. Thomas	W 79–49	1–2	12 – T. Caesar	8 – E. Matadi	6 – K. Wilson	Sharp Gymnasium (301); Houston, TX
November 16, 2023*; 5:00 p.m., ACCN		at No. 9 Virginia Tech	L 36–105	1–3	13 – E. McGuire	2 – E. Matadi	1 – A. Cotton	Cassell Coliseum (4,226); Blacksburg, VA
November 20, 2023*; 7:00 p.m., SECN+		at Texas A&M	L 35–80	1–4	8 – K. Wilson	5 – N. Collins	2 – E. McGuire	Reed Arena (3,073); College Station, TX
November 22, 2023*; 6:00 p.m., ESPN+		Mount St. Joseph	W 80–46	2–4	17 – N. Collins	7 – N. Collins	6 – J. Oly	Sharp Gymnasium (205); Houston, TX
November 27, 2023*; 6:00 p.m., ESPN+		Howard Payne	W 79–51	3–4	22 – Collins	8 – Collins	5 – Wilson	Sharp Gymnasium (250); Houston, TX
December 1, 2023*; 6:00 p.m., ESPN+		at Texas Tech	L 34–79	3–5	14 – N. Collins	6 – A. Cotton	4 – J. Oly	United Supermarkets Arena (4,516); Lubbock, TX
December 4, 2023*; 6:00 p.m., ESPN+		at Wichita State	W 49–44	4–5	13 – N. Collins	10 – A. Cotton	4 – K. Wilson	Charles Koch Arena (1,023); Wichita, KS
December 6, 2023*; 6:30 p.m., ESPN+		at Kansas	L 57–79	4–6	16 – N. Collins	9 – N. Collins	3 – J. Oly	Allen Fieldhouse (2,434); Lawrence, KS
December 18, 2023*; 1:00 p.m., ESPN+		Schreiner	W 66–40	5–6	21 – N. Collins	8 – A. Cotton	4 – J. Oly	Sharp Gymnasium (267); Houston, TX
Southland Conference season
January 3, 2024; 7:00 p.m., ESPN+		at Texas A&M–Corpus Christi	L 49–73	5–7 (0–1)	8 – N. Collins	9 – N. Collins	4 – A. Cotton	American Bank Center (678); Corpus Christi, TX
January 6, 2024; 1:00 p.m., ESPN+		Nicholls	L 55–73	5–8 (0–2)	23 – N. Collins	13 – N. Collins	4 – E. Maguire	Sharp Gymnasium (243); Houston, TX
January 11, 2024; 6:30 p.m., ESPN+		at Northwestern State	L 61–63	5–9 (0–3)	24 – K. Wilson	10 – J. Oly	3 – K. Wilson	Prather Coliseum (824); Natchitoches, LA
January 13, 2024; 3:30 p.m., ESPN+		at Texas A&M–Commerce	L 53–63	5–10 (0–4)	15 – E. Maguire	9 – tied (2)	4 – tied (2)	The Field House (241); Commerce, TX
January 18, 2024; 6:00 p.m., ESPN+		New Orleans	L 48–57	5–11 (0–5)	13 – E. Maguire	10 – N. Collins	3 – N. Collins	Sharp Gymnasium (250); Houston, TX
January 20, 2024; 1:00 p.m., ESPN+		Lamar	L 54–65	5–12 (0–6)	20 – N. Collins	8 – tied (2)	3 – tied (2)	Sharp Gymnasium (383); Houston, TX
January 25, 2024; 6:00 p.m., ESPN+		Southeastern Louisiana	L 51–53	5–13 (0–7)	16 – N. Collins	12 – N. Collins	4 – tied (2)	Sharp Gymnasium (200); Houston, TX
January 27, 2024; 2:00 p.m., ESPN+		at Incarnate Word	L 49–77	5–14 (0–8)	15 – N. Collins	5 – N. Collins	3 – E. Maguire	McDermott Center (181); San Antonio, TX
February 1, 2024; 6:30 p.m., ESPN+		at New Orleans	L 61–71	5–15 (0–9)	22 – N. Collins	9 – N. Collins	5 – E. Maguire	Lakefront Arena (375); New Orleans, LA
February 3, 2024; 1:00 p.m., ESPN+		at Nicholls	L 50–52	5–16 (0–10)	14 – N. Collins	10 – N. Collins	3 – N. Collins	Stopher Gymnasium (503); Thibodaux, LA
February 8, 2024; 6:00 p.m., ESPN+		McNeese	W 56–51	6–16 (1–10)	21 – N. Collins	11 – J. Oly	5 – K. Wilson	Sharp Gymnasium (200); Houston, TX
February 10, 2024; 1:00 p.m., ESPN+		Incarnate Word	L 40–67	6–17 (1–11)	17 – E. Maguire	7 – H. Fields	1 – K. Wilson	Sharp Gymnasium (231); Houston, TX
February 17, 2024; 1:00 p.m., ESPN+		at Southeastern Louisiana	L 40–60	6–18 (1–12)	11 – K. Wilson	6 – J. Oly	3 – K. Wilson	Pride Roofing University Center (644); Hammond, LA
February 22, 2024; 6:00 p.m., ESPN+		Texas A&M–Corpus Christi	W 68–42	6–19 (1–13)	14 – N. Collins	9 – N. Collins	2 – N. Collins	Sharp Gymnasium (280); Houston, TX
February 24, 2024; 1:00 p.m., ESPN+		Northwestern State	L 55–64	6–20 (1–14)	19 – M. Bagayegou	5 – E. Maguire	4 – N. Collins	Sharp Gymnasium (245); Houston, TX
February 29, 2024; 7:00 p.m., ESPN+		at McNeese	L 64–72	6–21 (1–15)	17 – E. Maguire	13 – N. Collins	2 – E. Maguire	The Legacy Center (1,190); Lake Charles, LA
March 2, 2024; 1:00 p.m., ESPN+		Texas A&M–Commerce	L 63–78	6–22 (1–16)	19 – N. Collins	9 – N. Collins	5 – N. Collins	Sharp Gymnasium (259); Houston, TX
March 7, 2024; 6:00 p.m., ESPN+		at Lamar	L 47–69	6–23 (1–17)	15 – N. Collins	7 – N. Collins	3 – N. Collins	Neches Arena (1,000); Beaumont, TX
*Non-conference game. ^{#}Rankings from AP poll. (#) Tournament seedings in parentheses. All times are in Central.

== See also ==
- 2023–24 Houston Christian Huskies men's basketball team
