= 2023–24 Tulsa Golden Hurricane women's basketball team =

American college basketball season

2023–24 Tulsa Golden Hurricane women's basketball

AAC regular season co-champions

WBIT, Quarterfinals
- Conference: American Athletic Conference
- Record: 25–10 (13–5 AAC)
- Head coach: Angie Nelp (3rd season)
- Assistant coaches: Sydni Means; Doug Brotherton; Mikaela Berza; John McCullough; Jeff Farina-Morelos
- Home arena: Reynolds Center

2023–24 American Athletic Conference women's basketball standings
	Conf.				Overall
Team	W		L	PCT	W		L	PCT
Tulsa	13	–	5	.722	25	–	10	.714
North Texas	13	–	5	.722	23	–	9	.719
Temple	13	–	5	.722	20	–	12	.625
UTSA	10	–	8	.556	18	–	15	.545
South Florida	10	–	8	.556	19	–	14	.576
Charlotte	9	–	9	.500	16	–	15	.516
UAB	9	–	9	.500	18	–	14	.563
Memphis	9	–	9	.500	13	–	17	.433
East Carolina	9	–	9	.500	19	–	14	.576
Rice †	9	–	9	.500	19	–	15	.559
SMU	8	–	10	.444	14	–	16	.467
Florida Atlantic	6	–	12	.333	11	–	19	.367
Wichita State	5	–	13	.278	10	–	22	.313
Tulane	3	–	15	.167	12	–	20	.375
† 2024 AAC tournament winner

The 2023–24 Tulsa Golden Hurricane women's basketball team represented the University of Tulsa during the 2023–24 NCAA Division I women's basketball season. The Golden Hurricane, led by third-year head coach Angie Nelp, played their home games at the Reynolds Center in Tulsa, Oklahoma as members of the American Athletic Conference.

== Previous season ==
The Golden Hurricane finished the 2022–23 season 17–13, 7–9 in AAC play to finish in a tie for sixth place. As the #7 seed in the AAC tournament, they were upset by #10 seed UCF in the first round.

== Roster ==
2023–24 Tulsa Golden Hurricane women's basketball team
Players
Coaches

Pos.	#	Name	Height	Year	Previous school	Hometown
G	0	Katia Gallegos	5 ft 7 in (1.7 m)	Sr	UTEP	El Paso, Texas
G	1	Cam Mathews	5 ft 7 in (1.7 m)	So	Keller High School	Keller, Texas
F	2	Temira Poindexter	6 ft 1 in (1.85 m)	Jr	Sapulpa High School	Sapulpa, Oklahoma
G	3	Alyssa Parmer	5 ft 8 in (1.73 m)	Jr	Putnam City North High School	Oklahoma City, Oklahoma
F	4	Lexie Foutch	6 ft 2 in (1.88 m)	Jr	Fort Gibson High School	Fort Gibson, Oklahoma
G	5	Delanie Crawford	5 ft 11 in (1.8 m)	Jr	Piedmont High School	Piedmont, Oklahoma
F	11	Caranda Perea	6 ft 2 in (1.88 m)	Sr	Temple	Altoona, Pennsylvania
G	12	Amira Brown	5 ft 10 in (1.78 m)	Jr	Laney College	Richmond, California
F	13	Jessika Evans	6 ft 0 in (1.83 m)	Sr	Norman North High School	Norman, Oklahoma
F	20	Katelyn Levings	6 ft 3 in (1.91 m)	Sr	Arizona State	Oklahoma City, Oklahoma
G/F	21	Hadley Periman	6 ft 2 in (1.88 m)	So	Tuttle High School	Tuttle, Oklahoma
G	22	Mady Cartwright	5 ft 10 in (1.78 m)	Fr	Greenwood High School	Greenwood, Arkansas
G	24	Elise Hill	5 ft 7 in (1.7 m)	Fr	Holland Hall	Tulsa, Oklahoma
G	30	Caroline Lyles	6 ft 0 in (1.83 m)	So	Argyle High School	Argyle, Texas
G	35	Ahrray Young	5 ft 11 in (1.8 m)	So	Laguna Creek High School	Elk Grove, California
F	54	Queen Ikhiuwu	6 ft 1 in (1.85 m)	Fr	IES Carmen Martin Gaite	Navalcarnero, Spain

Head coach

- Angie Nelp (Colorado State)

Assistant coach(es)

- Sydni Means (Mercer)
- Doug Brotherton (Central Michigan)
- Mikaela Berza (Ryerson)
- John McCullough (Oklahoma)
- Jeff Farina-Morelos (Marquette)

Legend

- (C) Team captain
- (S) Suspended
- (I) Ineligible
- (W) Walk-on
- Injured
- Current redshirt

Roster
Last update: December 14, 2023

== Schedule and results ==
Date time, TV	Rank^{#}	Opponent^{#}	Result	Record	High points	High rebounds	High assists	Site (attendance) city, state
Non-conference regular season
November 6, 2023*; 6:00 pm, ESPN+		at Lindenwood	W 89–80	1–0	35 – Crawford	9 – Crawford	6 – Poindexter	Hyland Performance Arena (372); St. Charles, MO
November 10, 2023*; 11:00 am, ESPN+		New Orleans	W 86–61	2–0	30 – Poindexter	12 – Periman	5 – Gallegos	Reynolds Center (2,258); Tulsa, OK
November 12, 2023*; 2:00 pm, ESPN+		Northwestern State	W 65–53	3–0	15 – Cartwright	10 – Periman	3 – Gallegos	Reynolds Center (1,003); Tulsa, OK
November 18, 2023*; 7:00 pm, KGEB/Cox Cable 23		at Oral Roberts; PSO Mayor's Cup	L 87–93	3–1	23 – Crawford	7 – 2 Tied	4 – Gallegos	Mabee Center (2,992); Tulsa, OK
November 24, 2023*; 3:45 pm, ESPN+		vs. Arkansas–Pine Bluff; Van Chancellor Classic	W 90–79	4–1	29 – Poindexter	11 – Periman	6 – Gallegos	Merrell Center (324); Katy, TX
November 25, 2023*; 6:00 pm, ESPN+		vs. Clemson; Van Chancellor Classic	W 74–64	5–1	26 – Poindexter	9 – Crawford	4 – Poindexter	Merrell Center (567); Katy, TX
November 26, 2023*; 5:30 pm, ESPN+		vs. No. 25 Mississippi State; Van Chancellor Classic	L 58–102	5–2	23 – Poindexter	7 – Periman	4 – Gallegos	Merrell Center (257); Katy, TX
December 1, 2023*; 6:30 pm, ESPN+		at TCU	L 50–82	5–3	15 – Poindexter	6 – Crawford	4 – 2 Tied	Schollmaier Arena (2,203); Fort Worth, TX
December 5, 2023*; 5:00 pm, ESPN+		Central Arkansas	W 60–58	6–3	22 – Poindexter	10 – Poindexter	3 – Poindexter	Reynolds Center (2,822); Tulsa, OK
December 10, 2023*; 1:00 pm, ESPNU		Florida	W 72–64	7–3	22 – Crawford	14 – Periman	3 – 2 Tied	Reynolds Center (2,205); Tulsa, OK
December 15, 2023*; 6:30 pm, ESPN+		Texas Southern	W 82–45	8–3	16 – Young	8 – Poindexter	4 – Periman	Reynolds Center (1,153); Tulsa, OK
December 19, 2023*; 9:00 pm, YouTube		vs. Texas Tech; Maui Classic	W 66–58	9–3	20 – Poindexter	8 – Poindexter	2 – Hill	Seabury Hall; Makawao, HI
December 20, 2023*; 9:00 pm, YouTube		vs. Southeastern Louisiana; Maui Classic	W 48–47	10–3	20 – Crawford	11 – Crawford	3 – Crawford	Seabury Hall; Makawao, HI
AAC regular season
December 30, 2023; 2:00 pm, ESPN+		at Memphis	W 71–62	11–3 (1–0)	18 – Crawford	11 – Crawford	5 – Young	Elma Roane Fieldhouse (739); Memphis, TN
January 2, 2024; 6:30 pm, ESPN+		Tulane	W 72–54	12–3 (2–0)	24 – Poindexter	8 – Crawford	5 – Crawford	Reynolds Center (1,031); Tulsa, OK
January 6, 2024; 2:00 pm, ESPN+		Temple	L 48–58	12–4 (2–1)	15 – Poindexter	8 – Periman	2 – 3 Tied	Reynolds Center (1,218); Tulsa, OK
January 10, 2024; 6:00 pm, ESPN+		at South Florida	L 52–68	12–5 (2–2)	26 – Crawford	8 – Periman	2 – Poindexter	Yuengling Center (2,633); Tampa, FL
January 13, 2024; 1:00 pm, ESPN+		at Florida Atlantic	W 81–72	13–5 (3–2)	25 – Crawford	6 – Periman	5 – Crawford	Eleanor R. Baldwin Arena (465); Boca Raton, FL
January 20, 2024; 2:00 pm, ESPN+		Wichita State	W 93–70	14–5 (4–2)	31 – Poindexter	12 – Young	7 – Crawford	Reynolds Center (1,186); Tulsa, OK
January 24, 2024; 6:30 pm, ESPN+		Rice	W 70–65	15–5 (5–2)	26 – Crawford	8 – Poindexter	4 – Cartwright	Reynolds Center (1,768); Tulsa, OK
January 27, 2024; 3:00 pm, ESPN+		at Charlotte	W 65–55	16–5 (6–2)	21 – Crawford	7 – Periman	4 – Poindexter	Dale F. Halton Arena (996); Charlotte, NC
February 1, 2024; 5:00 pm, ESPN+		at East Carolina	L 48–56	16–6 (6–3)	23 – Poindexter	6 – 2 Tied	4 – Poindexter	Williams Arena (968); Greenville, NC
February 4, 2024; 2:00 pm, ESPN+		North Texas	W 79–74	17–6 (7–3)	31 – Crawford	6 – 3 Tied	7 – Crawford	Reynolds Center (1,792); Tulsa, OK
February 10, 2024; 5:30 pm, ESPN+		at Rice	L 66–78	17–7 (7–4)	33 – Poindexter	10 – Poindexter	3 – 2 Tied	Tudor Fieldhouse (814); Houston, TX
February 14, 2024; 6:30 pm, ESPN+		UTSA	W 74–70	18–7 (8–4)	20 – Poindexter	8 – Crawford	6 – Gallegos	Reynolds Center (1,177); Tulsa, OK
February 17, 2024; 2:00 pm, ESPN+		at Wichita State	L 65–74	18–8 (8–5)	29 – Crawford	8 – Periman	3 – 2 Tied	Charles Koch Arena (1,638); Wichita, KS
February 21, 2024; 6:30 pm, ESPN+		UAB	W 84–72	19–8 (9–5)	30 – Poindexter	10 – Crawford	4 – 2 Tied	Reynolds Center (1,058); Tulsa, OK
February 25, 2024; 2:00 pm, ESPN+		South Florida	W 72–65	20–8 (10–5)	30 – Crawford	6 – Periman	2 – 3 Tied	Reynolds Center (1,393); Tulsa, OK
February 28, 2024; 6:00 pm, ESPN+		at Temple	W 76–67	21–8 (11–5)	30 – Poindexter	9 – Poindexter	3 – 2 Tied	Liacouras Center (2,341); Philadelphia, PA
March 2, 2024; 2:00 pm, ESPN+		SMU	W 91–73	22–8 (12–5)	21 – Poindexter	10 – Periman	4 – Gallegos	Reynolds Center (1,563); Tulsa, OK
March 5, 2024; 6:00 pm, ESPN+		at Tulane	W 61–56	23–8 (13–5)	19 – Poindexter	8 – Evans	3 – 4 Tied	Devlin Fieldhouse (1,008); New Orleans, LA
AAC tournament
March 11, 2024; 12:00 pm, ESPN+	(1)	vs. (9) East Carolina; Quarterfinals	L 71–75	23–9	31 – Poindexter	10 – 2 Tied	7 – Crawford	Dickies Arena; Fort Worth, TX
WBIT
March 21, 2024*; 6:30 pm, ESPN+	(3)	Arkansas; First Round	W 80–62	24–9	21 – Poindexter	7 – 2 Tied	6 – Periman	Reynolds Center (1,831); Tulsa, OK
March 24, 2024*; 2:00 pm, ESPN+	(3)	Georgetown; Second Round	W 73–61	25–9	21 – Crawford	10 – Periman	6 – Crawford	Reynolds Center (1,464); Tulsa, OK
March 28, 2024*; 6:30 pm, ESPN+	(3)	(4) Illinois; Quarterfinals	L 61–69	25–10	19 – Poindexter	7 – Periman	7 – Hill	Reynolds Center (3,054); Tulsa, OK
*Non-conference game. ^{#}Rankings from AP Poll. (#) Tournament seedings in parentheses. All times are in Central.
