= Royce Chadwick =

American basketball coach

Biographical details
- Education: Southwestern Oklahoma State

Coaching career (HC unless noted)
- 1983–1984: Olton HS
- 1984–1986: Oklahoma Panhandle
- 1986–1989: Sam Houston
- 1989–1994: Howard (TX)
- 1994–2001: Stephen F. Austin
- 2001–2012: Marshall
- 2012–2025: Texas A&M–Corpus Christi

Accomplishments and honors

Awards
- 3× Southland Coach of the Year (1997, 2014, 2020)

Royce Chadwick is an American basketball coach who recently was the head coach of the Texas A&M–Corpus Christi Islanders women's basketball team. As of the end of the 2021–22 season, Chadwick is the all-time winningest coach in Southland Conference history, with 211 conference victories.

== Coaching career ==
In 2012, Chadwick was hired by Texas A&M University–Corpus Christi after 12 seasons at Marshall, where he led the Thundering Herd to seven winning seasons.

After the 2021–22 season, Chadwick signed a three-year contract extension through the end of the 2024–25.

== Head coaching record ==
Record table
Season	Team	Overall	Conference	Standing	Postseason
Stephen F. Austin Ladyjacks (Southland) (1994–2001)
1994–95	Stephen F. Austin	22–8	15–3	2nd	NCAA First Round
1995–96	Stephen F. Austin	27–4	18–0	1st	NCAA Sweet Sixteen
1996–97	Stephen F. Austin	28–5	16–0	1st	NCAA Second Round
1997–98	Stephen F. Austin	25–4	15–1	1st	NCAA First Round
1998–99	Stephen F. Austin	18–11	12–6	T-2nd	NCAA First Round
1999–2000	Stephen F. Austin	28–4	17–1	1st	NCAA Second Round
2000–01	Stephen F. Austin	26–7	18–2	1st	NCAA First Round
Stephen F. Austin:		174–43 (.802)	111–13 (.895)		
Marshall Thundering Herd (MAC) (2001–2005)
2001–02	Marshall	9–19	5–11	5th (East)	
2002–03	Marshall	12–17	7–9	4th (East)	
2003–04	Marshall	18–12	8–8	3rd (East)	
2004–05	Marshall	19–10	12–4	T–1st (East)	
Marshall Thundering Herd (Conference USA) (2005–2012)
2005–06	Marshall	15–14	9–7	5th	
2006–07	Marshall	15–15	8–8	8th	
2007–08	Marshall	17–16	7–9	T-6th	
2008–09	Marshall	17–15	8–8	T-7th	
2009–10	Marshall	14–16	6–10	T-9th	
2010–11	Marshall	9–21	5–11	T-10th	
2011–12	Marshall	16–14	7–9	T-7th	
Marshall:		161–169 (.488)	82–94 (.466)		
Texas A&M–Corpus Christi Islanders (Southland) (2012–2025)
2012–13	Texas A&M–Corpus Christi	4–25	3–15	10th	
2013–14	Texas A&M–Corpus Christi	18–12	11–7	T-4th	
2014–15	Texas A&M–Corpus Christi	16–14	12–6	4th	
2015–16	Texas A&M–Corpus Christi	9–20	6–12	10th	
2016–17	Texas A&M–Corpus Christi	14–18	8–10	6th	
2017–18	Texas A&M–Corpus Christi	19–12	11–7	4th	
2018–19	Texas A&M–Corpus Christi	17–16	8–10	6th	
2019–20	Texas A&M–Corpus Christi	23–7	17–3	1st	Postseason cancelled due to the COVID-19 pandemic.
2020–21	Texas A&M–Corpus Christi	6–13	4–7	11th	
2021–22	Texas A&M–Corpus Christi	19–10	11–3	2nd	
2022–23	Texas A&M–Corpus Christi	19–12	14–4	T-1st	WNIT First Round
2023–24	Texas A&M–Corpus Christi	23–9	14–4	T-2nd	NCAA First Round
2024–25	Texas A&M–Corpus Christi	15–17	7–13	8th	
Texas A&M–Corpus Christi:		202–185 (.522)	132–101 (.567)		
Total:		0–0 (–)			
National champion Postseason invitational champion Conference regular season champion Conference regular season and conference tournament champion Division regular season champion Division regular season and conference tournament champion Conference tournament champion

== See also ==
- List of college women's basketball career coaching wins leaders
