= 2024 American Athletic Conference women's basketball tournament =

- Classification: Division I
- Season: 2023–24
- Teams: 14
- Site: Dickies Arena; Fort Worth, Texas
- Champions: Rice (1st title)
- Winning coach: Lindsay Edmonds (1st title)
- MVP: Malia Fisher (Rice)
- Television: ESPN+, ESPNU

2023–24 American Athletic Conference women's basketball standings
	Conf.				Overall
Team	W		L	PCT	W		L	PCT
Tulsa	13	–	5	.722	25	–	10	.714
North Texas	13	–	5	.722	23	–	9	.719
Temple	13	–	5	.722	20	–	12	.625
UTSA	10	–	8	.556	18	–	15	.545
South Florida	10	–	8	.556	19	–	14	.576
Charlotte	9	–	9	.500	16	–	15	.516
UAB	9	–	9	.500	18	–	14	.563
Memphis	9	–	9	.500	13	–	17	.433
East Carolina	9	–	9	.500	19	–	14	.576
Rice †	9	–	9	.500	19	–	15	.559
SMU	8	–	10	.444	14	–	16	.467
Florida Atlantic	6	–	12	.333	11	–	19	.367
Wichita State	5	–	13	.278	10	–	22	.313
Tulane	3	–	15	.167	12	–	20	.375
† 2024 AAC tournament winner

The 2024 American Athletic Conference women's basketball tournament was a postseason tournament held from March 9–13, 2024, at Dickies Arena in Fort Worth, Texas.

== Seeds ==
Teams were seeded by conference record. The top four teams received byes to the quarterfinals.

Tiebreakers may be applied as needed to properly seed the teams.

Seed	School	Conference record	Tiebreaker
1	Tulsa	13–5	2–1 vs. North Texas/Temple
2	North Texas	13–5	1–1 vs. Tulsa/Temple
3	Temple	13–5	1–2 vs. Tulsa/North Texas
4	UTSA	10–8	1–0 vs. South Florida
5	South Florida	10–8	0–1 vs. UTSA
6	Charlotte	9–9	3–2 vs. Memphis/UAB/East Carolina/Rice; 1–0 vs. UAB
7	UAB	9–9	3–2 vs. Memphis/Charlotte/East Carolina/Rice; 0–1 vs. Charlotte
8	Memphis	9–9	4–3 vs. Charlotte/UAB/East Carolina/Rice
9	East Carolina	9–9	3–4 vs. Memphis/Charlotte/UAB/Rice
10	Rice	9–9	2–4 vs. Memphis/Charlotte/UAB/East Carolina
11	SMU	8–10	
12	Florida Atlantic	6–12	
13	Wichita State	5–13	
14	Tulane	3–15	

== Schedule ==
Game	Time	Matchup	Score	Television	Attendance
First round – March 9, 2024
1	4:00 pm	No. 13 Wichita State vs. No. 12 Florida Atlantic	64–50	ESPN+	1,518
2	6:00 pm	No. 14 Tulane vs. No. 11 SMU	68–62	ESPN+	1,518
Second round – March 10, 2024
3	12:00 pm	No. 9 East Carolina vs. No. 8 Memphis	65–63	ESPN+	1,506
4	2:00 pm	No. 13 Wichita State vs. No. 5 South Florida	62–69	ESPN+	1,506
5	6:00 pm	No. 10 Rice vs. No. 7 UAB	71–56	ESPN+	1,483
6	8:00 pm	No. 14 Tulane vs. No. 6 Charlotte	65–52	ESPN+	1,483
Quarterfinals – March 11, 2024
7	12:00 pm	No. 9 East Carolina vs. No. 1 Tulsa	75–71	ESPN+	1,602
8	2:00 pm	No. 5 South Florida vs. No. 4 UTSA	56–58	ESPN+	1,602
9	6:00 pm	No. 10 Rice vs. No. 2 North Texas	61–59	ESPN+	1,602
10	8:00 pm	No. 14 Tulane vs. No. 3 Temple	72–76 (3OT)	ESPN+	1,602
Semifinals – March 12, 2024
11	6:00 pm	No. 9 East Carolina vs No. 4 UTSA	55–54	ESPN+	1,520
12	8:00 pm	No. 10 Rice vs No. 3 Temple	60–57	ESPN+	1,520
Championship – March 13, 2024
13	6:00 pm	No. 9 East Carolina vs No. 10 Rice	41–61	ESPNU	2,682
*Game times in CT. ()-Rankings denote tournament seeding.

== Bracket ==
First round Saturday, March 9
12	Florida Atlantic	50
13	Wichita State	64
11	SMU	62
14	Tulane	68

Second round Sunday, March 10
8	Memphis	63
9	East Carolina	65
5	South Florida	69
13	Wichita State	62
7	UAB	56
10	Rice	71
6	Charlotte	52
14	Tulane	65

Quarterfinals; Monday, March 11
1	Tulsa	71
9	East Carolina	75
4	UTSA	58
5	South Florida	56
2	North Texas	59
10	Rice	61
3	Temple	76***
14	Tulane	72

Semifinals; Tuesday, March 12
9	East Carolina	55
4	UTSA	54
10	Rice	60
3	Temple	57

Championship; Wednesday, March 13
9	East Carolina	41
10	Rice	61

* denotes overtime period

== See also ==
- 2024 American Athletic Conference men's basketball tournament
