= 2023–24 SMU Mustangs women's basketball team =

American college basketball season

2023–24 SMU Mustangs women's basketball
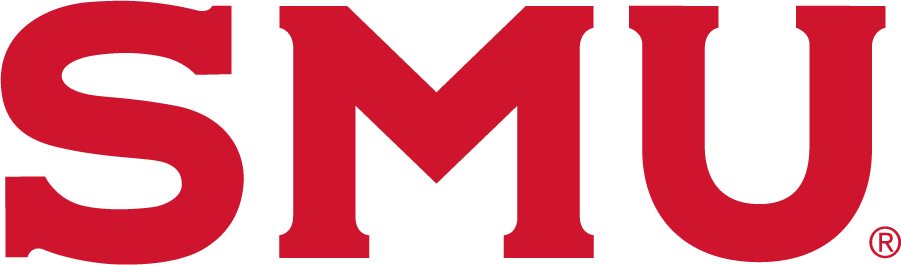
- Conference: American Athletic Conference
- Record: 14–16 (8–10 AAC)
- Head coach: Toyelle Wilson (3rd season)
- Associate head coach: Deneen Parker
- Assistant coaches: Danielle Edwards; Anthony Anderson; Brian Porth; Alex Furr
- Home arena: Moody Coliseum

2023–24 American Athletic Conference women's basketball standings
| | Conf. | | | | Overall |
| Team | W | | L | PCT | W | | L | PCT |
|---|---|---|---|---|---|---|---|---|
| Tulsa | 13 | – | 5 | .722 | 25 | – | 10 | .714 |
| North Texas | 13 | – | 5 | .722 | 23 | – | 9 | .719 |
| Temple | 13 | – | 5 | .722 | 20 | – | 12 | .625 |
| UTSA | 10 | – | 8 | .556 | 18 | – | 15 | .545 |
| South Florida | 10 | – | 8 | .556 | 19 | – | 14 | .576 |
| Charlotte | 9 | – | 9 | .500 | 16 | – | 15 | .516 |
| UAB | 9 | – | 9 | .500 | 18 | – | 14 | .563 |
| Memphis | 9 | – | 9 | .500 | 13 | – | 17 | .433 |
| East Carolina | 9 | – | 9 | .500 | 19 | – | 14 | .576 |
| Rice † | 9 | – | 9 | .500 | 19 | – | 15 | .559 |
| SMU | 8 | – | 10 | .444 | 14 | – | 16 | .467 |
| Florida Atlantic | 6 | – | 12 | .333 | 11 | – | 19 | .367 |
| Wichita State | 5 | – | 13 | .278 | 10 | – | 22 | .313 |
| Tulane | 3 | – | 15 | .167 | 12 | – | 20 | .375 |
† 2024 AAC tournament winner

The 2023–24 SMU Mustangs women's basketball team represented Southern Methodist University during the 2023–24 NCAA Division I women's basketball season. The Mustangs, led by third-year head coach Toyelle Wilson, played their home games at Moody Coliseum in University Park, Texas as members of the American Athletic Conference. This will be SMU's final season as members of the American Athletic Conference, as they were joining the Atlantic Coast Conference in July 2024.

== Previous season ==
The Mustangs finished the 2022–23 season 17–12, 7–8 in AAC play to finish in fifth place. As the #5 seed in the AAC tournament, they lost to #4 seed Houston in the quarterfinals. They received an at-large bid into the WNIT, where they would defeat Little Rock in the first round, before falling to Texas Tech in the second round.

== Roster ==
2023–24 SMU Mustangs women's basketball team
Players
Coaches

| Pos. | # | Name | Height | Year | Previous school | Hometown |
|---|---|---|---|---|---|---|
| G | 0 | Tamia Jones | 5 ft 8 in (1.73 m) | Sr | The Colony High School | The Colony, Texas |
| G | 1 | Tiara Young | 5 ft 9 in (1.75 m) | GS | Houston | Shreveport, Louisiana |
| G | 2 | TK Pitts | 6 ft 1 in (1.85 m) | So | Union High School | Lubbock, Texas |
| G | 3 | Aaliyah Henderson | 5 ft 7 in (1.7 m) | Fr | Norman High School | Norman, Oklahoma |
| G | 4 | Jiya Perry | 5 ft 10 in (1.78 m) | So | DeSoto High School | DeSoto, Texas |
| G | 5 | Ella Brow | 5 ft 8 in (1.73 m) | So | Palm Beach Currumbin High School | Palm Beach, Australia |
| G | 10 | Maya Chandler | 5 ft 7 in (1.7 m) | Sr | Loyola Chicago | Martinsville, Indiana |
| G | 13 | Reagan Bradley | 5 ft 8 in (1.73 m) | GS | Little Rock Christian Academy | Little Rock, Arkansas |
| G | 14 | Shanel Reid | 5 ft 11 in (1.8 m) | Fr | Austin High School | Austin, Texas |
| F | 23 | Amirah Abdur-Rahim | 6 ft 3 in (1.91 m) | Sr | Notre Dame | Marietta, Georgia |
| G | 24 | Donavia Hall | 5 ft 10 in (1.78 m) | So | Plano East High School | Plano, Texas |
| F | 33 | Chantae Embry | 6 ft 1 in (1.85 m) | Jr | Texas Tech | Norman, Oklahoma |
| C | 35 | Jessica Peterson | 6 ft 2 in (1.88 m) | Jr | Fresno State | Rancho Cucamonga, California |

Head coach

- Toyelle Wilson (Manhattan)

Assistant coach(es)

- Deneen Parker (Stephen F. Austin)
- Danielle Edwards (Clemson)
- Anthony Anderson (FIU)
- Brian Porth (SMU)
- Alex Furr (Fresno State)

Legend

- (C) Team captain
- (S) Suspended
- (I) Ineligible
- (W) Walk-on
- Injured
- Current redshirt

Roster
Last update: December 16, 2023

== Schedule and results ==
| Date time, TV | Rank^{#} | Opponent^{#} | Result | Record | High points | High rebounds | High assists | Site (attendance) city, state |
Exhibition
| November 1, 2023*; 7:00 pm | | Southern Nazarene | W 74–58 | – | – | – | – | Moody Coliseum; University Park, TX |
Non-conference regular season
| November 6, 2023*; 4:00 pm, ESPN+ | | UC Riverside | W 78–55 | 1–0 | 20 – Young | 12 – Embry | 5 – 2 Tied | Moody Coliseum (541); University Park, TX |
| November 11, 2023*; 2:00 pm, ESPN+ | | Alabama State | W 96–47 | 2–0 | 18 – Abdur-Rahim | 11 – Abdur-Rahim | 9 – Bradley | Moody Coliseum (549); University Park, TX |
| November 14, 2023*; 11:00 am, ESPN+ | | Nicholls | W 69–54 | 3–0 | 24 – Young | 10 – Pitts | 8 – Jones | Moody Coliseum (4,548); University Park, TX |
| November 18, 2023*; 8:00 pm, ESPN+ | | No. 5 Colorado | L 69–84 | 3–1 | 30 – Young | 8 – Embry | 4 – Embry | Moody Coliseum (1,749); University Park, TX |
| November 24, 2023*; 2:00 pm, FloSports | | vs. Toledo; San Diego Classic | L 73–74 | 3–2 | 18 – Young | 9 – Abdur-Rahim | 5 – Jones | Harry West Gymnasium; San Diego, CA |
| November 25, 2023*; 4:30 pm, FloSports | | vs. Harvard; San Diego Classic | L 67–80 | 3–3 | 17 – Young | 8 – Young | 4 – Bradley | Harry West Gymnasium (255); San Diego, CA |
| November 30, 2023*; 7:00 pm, ESPNU | | No. 13 Baylor | L 61–85 | 3–4 | 17 – Jones | 9 – Young | 3 – 2 Tied | Moody Coliseum (2,294); University Park, TX |
| December 4, 2023*; 7:00 pm, ESPN+ | | Arkansas–Pine Bluff | L 76–78 | 3–5 | 22 – Young | 10 – Pitts | 5 – Bradley | Moody Coliseum (969); University Park, TX |
| December 14, 2023*; 6:00 pm, ESPN+ | | at Louisiana Tech | W 69–53 | 4–5 | 19 – Young | 7 – Henderson | 5 – Jones | Thomas Assembly Center (1,655); Ruston, LA |
| December 18, 2023*; 7:00 pm, ESPN+ | | Sam Houston | W 69–64 | 5–5 | 15 – Abdur-Rahim | 13 – Abdur-Rahim | 6 – Bradley | Moody Coliseum (1,186); University Park, TX |
| December 21, 2023*; 1:00 pm, ESPN+ | | Air Force | W 75–55 | 6–5 | 19 – Abdur-Rahim | 11 – Abdur-Rahim | 6 – Jones | Moody Coliseum (1,031); University Park, TX |
AAC regular season
| December 30, 2023; 6:00 pm, ESPN+ | | at South Florida | L 61–70 | 6–6 (0–1) | 17 – Young | 7 – Abdur-Rahim | 3 – Bradley | Yuengling Center (2,142); Tampa, FL |
| January 4, 2024; 7:00 pm, ESPN+ | | Florida Atlantic | W 57–52 | 7–6 (1–1) | 16 – Jones | 10 – Abdur-Rahim | 7 – Bradley | Moody Coliseum (724); University Park, TX |
| January 7, 2024; 2:00 pm, ESPN+ | | Rice | L 63–65 | 7–7 (1–2) | 24 – Abdur-Rahim | 7 – Abdur-Rahim | 6 – Jones | Moody Coliseum (985); University Park, TX |
| January 11, 2024; 7:00 pm, ESPN+ | | at Memphis | W 91–86 ^{2OT} | 8–7 (2–2) | 38 – Young | 15 – Young | 2 – Bradley | Elma Roane Fieldhouse (854); Memphis, TN |
| January 14, 2024; 6:00 pm, ESPN+ | | at UAB | L 75–84 | 8–8 (2–3) | 32 – Young | 6 – Young | 5 – 2 Tied | Bartow Arena (491); Birmingham, AL |
| January 17, 2024; 7:00 pm, ESPN+ | | North Texas | L 61–76 | 8–9 (2–4) | 16 – Young | 7 – Abdur-Rahim | 5 – Jones | Moody Coliseum (902); University Park, TX |
| January 20, 2024; 1:00 pm, ESPN+ | | at East Carolina | L 61–68 | 8–10 (2–5) | 19 – Embry | 9 – 2 Tied | 4 – 2 Tied | Williams Arena (1,259); Greenville, NC |
| January 24, 2024; 7:00 pm, ESPN+ | | Temple | W 68–66 | 9–10 (3–5) | 24 – Embry | 8 – Embry | 3 – Embry | Moody Coliseum (865); University Park, TX |
| January 27, 2024; 2:00 pm, ESPN+ | | UTSA | W 75–58 | 10–10 (4–5) | 18 – 2 Tied | 10 – Abdur-Rahim | 7 – Bradley | Moody Coliseum (1,396); University Park, TX |
| January 31, 2024; 7:00 pm, ESPN+ | | at Rice | L 60–69 | 10–11 (4–6) | 18 – Young | 10 – Embry | 6 – Young | Tudor Fieldhouse (804); Houston, TX |
| February 3, 2024; 2:00 pm, ESPN+ | | Memphis | W 81–73 | 11–11 (5–6) | 26 – Embry | 5 – 2 Tied | 8 – Bradley | Moody Coliseum (1,456); University Park, TX |
| February 10, 2024; 2:00 pm, ESPN+ | | at North Texas | L 65–78 | 11–12 (5–7) | 21 – Abdur-Rahim | 9 – Abdur-Rahim | 3 – Embry | The Super Pit (1,878); Denton, TX |
| February 14, 2024; 6:00 pm, ESPN+ | | at Tulane | W 63–53 | 12–12 (6–7) | 14 – 2 Tied | 7 – 2 Tied | 3 – 2 Tied | Devlin Fieldhouse (762); New Orleans, LA |
| February 18, 2024; 4:30 pm, ESPN+ | | Charlotte | W 64–49 | 13–12 (7–7) | 17 – Embry | 8 – Embry | 10 – Bradley | Moody Coliseum (1,407); University Park, TX |
| February 24, 2024; 2:00 pm, ESPN+ | | East Carolina | L 74–84 | 13–13 (7–8) | 14 – Abdur-Rahim | 6 – 2 Tied | 5 – Bradley | Moody Coliseum (1,021); University Park, TX |
| February 28, 2024; 6:00 pm, ESPN+ | | at Wichita State | W 88–84 ^{OT} | 14–13 (8–8) | 25 – Young | 9 – Pitts | 6 – Bradley | Charles Koch Arena (1,231); Wichita, KS |
| March 2, 2024; 2:00 pm, ESPN+ | | at Tulsa | L 73–91 | 14–14 (8–9) | 22 – Young | 10 – Pitts | 1 – 3 Tied | Reynolds Center (1,563); Tulsa, OK |
| March 5, 2024; 7:00 pm, ESPN+ | | South Florida | L 61–68 ^{OT} | 14–15 (8–10) | 21 – Embry | 8 – Chandler | 4 – 2 Tied | Moody Coliseum (1,065); University Park, TX |
AAC tournament
| March 9, 2024; 6:00 pm, ESPN+ | (11) | vs. (14) Tulane; First Round | L 62–68 | 14–16 | 17 – Young | 7 – Abdur-Rahim | 4 – Chandler | Dickies Arena (1,518); Fort Worth, TX |
*Non-conference game. ^{#}Rankings from AP Poll. (#) Tournament seedings in parentheses. All times are in Central.
