= 2023–24 Temple Owls women's basketball team =

American college basketball season

2023–24 Temple Owls women's basketball

AAC regular season co-champions
- Conference: American Athletic Conference
- Record: 20–12 (13–5 AAC)
- Head coach: Diane Richardson (2nd season)
- Assistant coaches: Cheyenne Curley; Myles Jackson; Wanisha Smith
- Home arena: Liacouras Center

2023–24 American Athletic Conference women's basketball standings
	Conf.				Overall
Team	W		L	PCT	W		L	PCT
Tulsa	13	–	5	.722	25	–	10	.714
North Texas	13	–	5	.722	23	–	9	.719
Temple	13	–	5	.722	20	–	12	.625
UTSA	10	–	8	.556	18	–	15	.545
South Florida	10	–	8	.556	19	–	14	.576
Charlotte	9	–	9	.500	16	–	15	.516
UAB	9	–	9	.500	18	–	14	.563
Memphis	9	–	9	.500	13	–	17	.433
East Carolina	9	–	9	.500	19	–	14	.576
Rice †	9	–	9	.500	19	–	15	.559
SMU	8	–	10	.444	14	–	16	.467
Florida Atlantic	6	–	12	.333	11	–	19	.367
Wichita State	5	–	13	.278	10	–	22	.313
Tulane	3	–	15	.167	12	–	20	.375
† 2024 AAC tournament winner

The 2023–24 Temple Owls women's basketball team represented Temple University during the 2023–24 NCAA Division I women's basketball season. The Owls, led by second-year head coach Diane Richardson, played their home games at the Liacouras Center in Philadelphia, Pennsylvania as members of the American Athletic Conference.

== Previous season ==
The Owls finished the 2022–23 season 11–18, 6–10 in AAC play to finish in a tie for eighth place. As the #9 seed in the AAC tournament, they lost to #8 seed Wichita State in the first round.

== Roster ==
2023–24 Temple Owls women's basketball team
Players
Coaches

Pos.	#	Name	Height	Year	Previous school	Hometown
G	1	Kendall Currence	5 ft 9 in (1.75 m)	GS	Northeastern	Bourne, Massachusetts
G	2	Aleah Nelson	5 ft 6 in (1.68 m)	Sr	Towson	Baltimore, Maryland
G	3	Makayla Waleed	5 ft 8 in (1.73 m)	Jr	Emerge Academy	Upper Marlboro, Maryland
F	8	Jaleesa Molina	6 ft 2 in (1.88 m)	Fr	Landslake Lions	The Hague, Netherlands
G	11	Tristen Taylor	5 ft 5 in (1.65 m)	Fr	Duncanville High School	Duncanville, Texas
G	12	Demi Washington	5 ft 10 in (1.78 m)	GS	Vanderbilt	Wake Forest, North Carolina
F/C	13	Alexandra Wilkinson	6 ft 2 in (1.88 m)	Sr	CCBC Essex	Woodbury, New Jersey
F	14	Ines Piper	6 ft 0 in (1.83 m)	Sr	Northwest Florida State College	Paris, France
G	15	Channing Williams	5 ft 7 in (1.7 m)	Fr	Shabach Christian Academy	Bowie, Maryland
F/C	21	Rayne Tucker	6 ft 1 in (1.85 m)	RS Sr	Towson	New Carrollton, Maryland
G	22	Tarriyonna Gary	5 ft 8 in (1.73 m)	Sr	Towson	Brooksville, Florida
C	25	Denise Solis	6 ft 1 in (1.85 m)	GS	UMass Lowell	Windsor, Connecticut
G	30	Drew Alexander	5 ft 11 in (1.8 m)	Fr	Shabach Christian Academy	Greensboro, North Carolina
C	34	Sheyenne Swain-Price	6 ft 0 in (1.83 m)	Fr	Dexter Southfield School	Stoughton, Massachusetts
G	55	Tiarra East	5 ft 10 in (1.78 m)	Jr	Butler Traditional High School	Louisville, Kentucky

Head coach

- Diane Richardson (Frostburg State)

Assistant coach(es)

- Cheyenne Curley (Howard)
- Myles Jackson (Towson)
- Wanisha Smith (Duke)

Legend

- (C) Team captain
- (S) Suspended
- (I) Ineligible
- (W) Walk-on
- Injured
- Current redshirt

Roster
Last update: December 16, 2023

== Schedule and results ==
Date time, TV	Rank^{#}	Opponent^{#}	Result	Record	Site (attendance) city, state
Non-conference regular season
November 6, 2023*; 4:00 pm, ESPN+		Delaware State	W 109–43	1–0	Liacouras Center; Philadelphia, PA
November 9, 2023*; 7:00 pm, ESPN+		Georgetown	L 45–68	1–1	Liacouras Center (1,117); Philadelphia, PA
November 11, 2023*; 7:00 pm, ESPN+		Bucknell	W 77–53	2–1	Liacouras Center (1,101); Philadelphia, PA
November 15, 2023*; 7:30 pm, ESPN+		at No. 23 Ole Miss	L 63–80	2–2	SJB Pavilion (2,335); Oxford, MS
November 19, 2023*; 2:00 pm, FloSports		at Villanova; Big 5	L 62–90	2–3	Finneran Pavilion (2,185); Villanova, PA
November 22, 2023*; 6:00 pm, ESPN+		Saint Joseph's; Rivalry/Big 5	L 65–67	2–4	Liacouras Center (1,016); Philadelphia, PA
December 1, 2023*; 6:00 pm, P12N		vs. Xavier; Briann January Classic	W 78–41	3–4	Desert Financial Arena; Tempe, AZ
December 2, 2023*; 3:00 pm, P12N		vs. Pacific; Briann January Classic	L 78–79	3–5	Desert Financial Arena; Tempe, AZ
December 10, 2023*; 2:00 pm, ESPN+		Penn; Big 5	W 61–47	4–5	Liacouras Center (1,364); Philadelphia, PA
December 14, 2023*; 7:00 pm, ESPN+		Delaware	W 72–65	5–5	Liacouras Center (1,109); Philadelphia, PA
December 17, 2023*; 1:00 pm, ESPN+		at La Salle; Big 5	W 85–61	6–5	Tom Gola Arena (412); Philadelphia, PA
December 21, 2023*; 11:00 am, ESPN+		Northwestern	L 68–72	6–6	Liacouras Center (2,233); Philadelphia, PA
AAC regular season
December 30, 2023; 1:00 pm, ESPN+		UTSA	W 71–58	7–6 (1–0)	Liacouras Center (1,324); Philadelphia, PA
January 2, 2024; 7:00 pm, ESPN+		North Texas	L 63–74	7–7 (1–1)	Liacouras Center (871); Philadelphia, PA
January 6, 2024; 3:00 pm, ESPN+		at Tulsa	W 58–48	8–7 (2–1)	Reynolds Center (1,218); Tulsa, OK
January 9, 2024; 7:00 pm, ESPN+		at Wichita State	W 72–49	9–7 (3–1)	Charles Koch Arena (1,060); Wichita, KS
January 14, 2024; 2:00 pm, ESPN+		Memphis	L 57–59	9–8 (3–2)	Liacouras Center (1,621); Philadelphia, PA
January 21, 2024; 1:00 pm, ESPN+		Charlotte	W 73–68	10–8 (4–2)	Liacouras Center (1,165); Philadelphia, PA
January 24, 2024; 8:00 pm, ESPN+		at SMU	L 66–68	10–9 (4–3)	Moody Coliseum (865); University Park, TX
January 28, 2024; 3:00 pm, ESPN+		at Tulane	W 68–50	11–9 (5–3)	Devlin Fieldhouse (861); New Orleans, LA
January 31, 2024; 7:00 pm, ESPN+		Wichita State	W 66–65	12–9 (6–3)	Liacouras Center (835); Philadelphia, PA
February 4, 2024; 2:00 pm, ESPN+		at Charlotte	L 81–88 ^{2OT}	12–10 (6–4)	Dale F. Halton Arena (1,006); Charlotte, NC
February 10, 2024; 3:00 pm, ESPN+		South Florida	W 59–55	13–10 (7–4)	Liacouras Center (1,596); Philadelphia, PA
February 14, 2024; 7:00 pm, ESPN+		at UAB	W 86–72	14–10 (8–4)	Bartow Arena (417); Birmingham, AL
February 19, 2024; 7:00 pm, ESPN+		Tulane	W 69–52	15–10 (9–4)	Liacouras Center (1,033); Philadelphia, PA
February 22, 2024; 7:30 pm, ESPN+		at UTSA	W 56–48	16–10 (10–4)	Convocation Center (881); San Antonio, TX
February 25, 2024; 3:00 pm, ESPN+		at Rice	W 75–66	17–10 (11–4)	Tudor Fieldhouse (1,109); Houston, TX
February 28, 2024; 7:00 pm, ESPN+		Tulsa	L 67–76	17–11 (11–5)	Liacouras Center (2,341); Philadelphia, PA
March 3, 2024; 2:00 pm, ESPN+		at East Carolina	W 81–66	18–11 (12–5)	Williams Arena (1,170); Greenville, NC
March 6, 2024; 7:00 pm, ESPN+		Florida Atlantic	W 74–53	19–11 (13–5)	Liacouras Center (1,189); Philadelphia, PA
AAC tournament
March 11, 2024; 9:00 pm, ESPN+	(3)	vs. (14) Tulane; Quarterfinals	W 76–72 ^{3OT}	20–11	Dickies Arena (1,602); Fort Worth, TX
March 12, 2024; 9:00 pm, ESPN+	(3)	vs. (10) Rice; Semifinals	L 57–60	20–12	Dickies Arena (1,520); Fort Worth, TX
*Non-conference game. ^{#}Rankings from AP Poll. (#) Tournament seedings in parentheses. All times are in Eastern.
