= 2023–24 Florida Atlantic Owls women's basketball team =

American college basketball season

2023–24 Florida Atlantic Owls women's basketball
- Conference: American Athletic Conference
- Record: 11–19 (6–12 AAC)
- Head coach: Jennifer Sullivan (3rd season)
- Assistant coaches: Jessica Jackson; Alex Varlan; David Lowery
- Home arena: Eleanor R. Baldwin Arena

2023–24 American Athletic Conference women's basketball standings
	Conf.				Overall
Team	W		L	PCT	W		L	PCT
Tulsa	13	–	5	.722	25	–	10	.714
North Texas	13	–	5	.722	23	–	9	.719
Temple	13	–	5	.722	20	–	12	.625
UTSA	10	–	8	.556	18	–	15	.545
South Florida	10	–	8	.556	19	–	14	.576
Charlotte	9	–	9	.500	16	–	15	.516
UAB	9	–	9	.500	18	–	14	.563
Memphis	9	–	9	.500	13	–	17	.433
East Carolina	9	–	9	.500	19	–	14	.576
Rice †	9	–	9	.500	19	–	15	.559
SMU	8	–	10	.444	14	–	16	.467
Florida Atlantic	6	–	12	.333	11	–	19	.367
Wichita State	5	–	13	.278	10	–	22	.313
Tulane	3	–	15	.167	12	–	20	.375
† 2024 AAC tournament winner

The 2023–24 Florida Atlantic Owls women's basketball team represented Florida Atlantic University during the 2023–24 NCAA Division I women's basketball season. The Owls, led by third-year head coach Jennifer Sullivan, played their home games at Eleanor R. Baldwin Arena in Boca Raton, Florida as first-year members of the American Athletic Conference.

== Previous season ==
The Owls finished the 2022–23 season 12–18, 5–15 in Conference USA (C-USA) play, to finish in a tie for tenth (last) place. As the #11 seed in the C-USA tournament, they lost to #6 seed UTSA in the first round. This was the Owls' final season as members of Conference USA, as they moved to the American Athletic Conference effective July 1, 2023.

== Roster ==
2023–24 Florida Atlantic Owls women's basketball team
Players
Coaches

Pos.	#	Name	Height	Year	Previous school	Hometown
G	1	Devyn Scott	5 ft 8 in (1.73 m)	Sr	Fairleigh Dickinson	Montgomery, NY
G	2	Aniya Hubbard	5 ft 8 in (1.73 m)	So	Hoover High School	Hoover, AL
G	4	Kristina Godfrey	5 ft 10 in (1.78 m)	Fr	Miami Country Day School	Miami, FL
G	11	Mya Perry	5 ft 11 in (1.8 m)	So	Ohio State	Reynoldsburg, OH
G	12	Allie Tylka	6 ft 0 in (1.83 m)	GS	Wauconda High School	Wauconda, IL
C	13	Evie Van Der Woude	6 ft 5 in (1.96 m)	Fr	Calandlyceum	Zwolle, Netherlands
G	14	Alexa Zaph	5 ft 8 in (1.73 m)	GS	Oxbridge Academy	Jupiter, FL
G/F	15	Kayana Armbrister	6 ft 0 in (1.83 m)	Fr	Dexter Southfield School	Boston, MA
F	21	Maria Myklebust	6 ft 1 in (1.85 m)	Jr	Vermont	Asker, Norway
C	22	Dyllan Hanna	6 ft 2 in (1.88 m)	So	Bartram Trail High School	St. Augustine, FL
G	23	Jada Moore	5 ft 11 in (1.8 m)	Sr	Kansas State	Denver, CO
G	24	Rose Caverly	5 ft 10 in (1.78 m)	GS	Quinnipiac	Brick, NJ
F	30	Janeta Rozentale	6 ft 0 in (1.83 m)	GS	South Florida	Dobele, Latvia
F	33	Carlie Vick	6 ft 2 in (1.88 m)	So	Westminster Christian Academy	St. Albans, MO

Head coach

- Jennifer Sullivan (Memphis)

Assistant coach(es)

- Jessica Jackson (Western Carolina)
- Alex Varlan (Tennessee)
- David Lowery (Mississippi State)

Legend

- (C) Team captain
- (S) Suspended
- (I) Ineligible
- (W) Walk-on
- Injured
- Current redshirt

Roster
Last update: December 15, 2023

== Schedule and results ==
Date time, TV	Rank^{#}	Opponent^{#}	Result	Record	High points	High rebounds	High assists	Site (attendance) city, state
Exhibition
November 1, 2023*; 7:00 p.m.		Barry	W 90–43	–	–	–	–	Eleanor R. Baldwin Arena; Boca Raton, FL
Non-conference regular season
November 9, 2023*; 7:30 p.m., ESPN+		at Mercer	L 62–70	0–1	28 – Hubbard	9 – Hubbard	3 – Scott	Hawkins Arena (934); Macon, GA
November 13, 2023*; 7:00 p.m., ESPN+		at North Florida	W 84–75 ^{OT}	1–1	24 – Hubbard	9 – Moore	7 – Scott	UNF Arena (599); Jacksonville, FL
November 17, 2023*; 8:00 p.m., ESPN+		Chicago State	W 80–57	2–1	24 – Hubbard	13 – Rozentale	3 – 2 tied	Eleanor R. Baldwin Arena (492); Boca Raton, FL
November 20, 2023*; 7:00 p.m., ESPN+		Stetson	W 50–39	3–1	16 – Moore	9 – Rozentale	3 – Moore	Eleanor R. Baldwin Arena (478); Boca Raton, FL
November 25, 2023*; 2:00 p.m., ESPN+		at Kennesaw State	L 43–57	3–2	11 – Hubbard	7 – Hubbard	2 – 2 tied	KSU Convocation Center (136); Kennesaw, GA
November 29, 2023*; 8:00 p.m., B1G+		at Nebraska	L 53–77	3–3	9 – Caverly	7 – Hanna	2 – Moore	Pinnacle Bank Arena (3,897); Lincoln, NE
December 5, 2023*; 7:00 p.m., ESPN+		St. Thomas (FL)	W 78–60	4–3	19 – Perry	7 – Moore	6 – Scott	Eleanor R. Baldwin Arena (412); Boca Raton, FL
December 14, 2023*; 11:00 a.m., ESPN+		FIU	L 62–65	4–4	24 – Perry	13 – Rozentale	6 – Moore	Eleanor R. Baldwin Arena (2,067); Boca Raton, FL
December 16, 2023*; 2:00 p.m., ESPN+		Howard	L 45–46	4–5	19 – Perry	11 – Rozentale	3 – Caverly	Eleanor R. Baldwin Arena (389); Boca Raton, FL
December 18, 2023*; 2:00 p.m., ESPN+		at UCF	W 59–58	5–5	18 – Perry	10 – Moore	4 – 2 tied	Addition Financial Arena (797); Orlando, FL
December 21, 2023*; 11:00 a.m., FloHoops		vs. San Diego State; West Palm Beach Classic	L 48–75	5–6	12 – Rozentale	11 – Rozentale	4 – Scott	Massimino Court (46); West Palm Beach, FL
AAC regular season
December 30, 2023; 1:00 p.m., ESPN+		UAB	L 53–65	5–7 (0–1)	17 – Moore	11 – Hanna	1 – 5 tied	Eleanor R. Baldwin Arena (346); Boca Raton, FL
January 4, 2024; 8:00 p.m., ESPN+		at SMU	L 52–57	5–8 (0–2)	11 – 2 tied	19 – Rozentale	4 – Rozentale	Moody Coliseum (724); University Park, TX
January 7, 2024; 3:00 p.m., ESPN+		at North Texas	L 52–86	5–9 (0–3)	21 – Moore	11 – Rozentale	2 – Rozentale	The Super Pit (1,368); Denton, TX
January 10, 2024; 7:00 p.m., ESPN+		UTSA	L 60–73	5–10 (0–4)	6 – Perry	9 – 2 tied	6 – Moore	Eleanor R. Baldwin Arena (243); Boca Raton, FL
January 13, 2024; 2:00 p.m., ESPN+		Tulsa	L 72–81	5–11 (0–5)	18 – 2 tied	10 – Moore	2 – 3 tied	Eleanor R. Baldwin Arena (465); Boca Raton, FL
January 20, 2024; 3:00 p.m., ESPN+		at Memphis	L 56–76	5–12 (0–6)	19 – Hubbard	12 – Rozentale	3 – Scott	Elma Roane Fieldhouse (959); Memphis, TN
January 25, 2024; 7:00 p.m., ESPN+		East Carolina	L 71–78	5–13 (0–7)	30 – Hubbard	9 – Hubbard	3 – 2 tied	Eleanor R. Baldwin Arena (435); Boca Raton, FL
January 27, 2024; 7:00 p.m., ESPN+		at Wichita State	W 63–56	6–13 (1–7)	21 – Hubbard	7 – Moore	6 – Hubbard	Charles Koch Arena (1,440); Wichita, KS
January 31, 2024; 7:00 p.m., ESPN+		at UAB	L 72–83	6–14 (1–8)	23 – Hubbard	6 – Rozentale	3 – 3 tied	Bartow Arena (516); Birmingham, AL
February 3, 2024; 1:00 p.m., ESPN+		Rice	W 68–63	7–14 (2–8)	21 – Rozentale	7 – Rozentale	3 – 2 tied	Eleanor R. Baldwin Arena (484); Boca Raton, FL
February 7, 2024; 6:30 p.m., ESPN+		at Charlotte	W 66–55	8–14 (3–8)	22 – Zaph	11 – Rozentale	3 – 2 tied	Dale F. Halton Arena (668); Charlotte, NC
February 10, 2024; 2:00 p.m., ESPN+		Wichita State	L 56–67	8–15 (3–9)	18 – Perry	18 – Rozentale	6 – Zaph	Eleanor R. Baldwin Arena (708); Boca Raton, FL
February 14, 2024; 7:00 p.m., ESPN+		North Texas	L 57–67	8–16 (3–10)	18 – Zaph	8 – Rozentale	3 – Rozentale	Eleanor R. Baldwin Arena (212); Boca Raton, FL
February 17, 2024; 7:00 p.m., ESPN+		at South Florida	W 67–55	9–16 (4–10)	22 – Moore	11 – Moore	4 – Moore	Yuengling Center (3,724); Tampa, FL
February 25, 2024; 2:00 p.m., ESPN+		at UTSA	L 60–76	9–17 (4–11)	16 – Scott	6 – Rozentale	3 – Zaph	Convocation Center (751); San Antonio, TX
February 28, 2024; 7:00 p.m., ESPN+		Tulane	W 80–67	10–17 (5–11)	22 – Zaph	12 – Rozentale	8 – Scott	Eleanor R. Baldwin Arena (404); Boca Raton, FL
March 3, 2024; 2:00 p.m., ESPN+		Charlotte	W 56–47	11–17 (6–11)	14 – Rozentale	9 – Rozentale	5 – Scott	Eleanor R. Baldwin Arena (512); Boca Raton, FL
March 6, 2024; 7:00 p.m., ESPN+		at Temple	L 53–74	11–18 (6–12)	12 – Hubbard	8 – Hanna	4 – Moore	Liacouras Center (1,189); Philadelphia, PA
AAC tournament
March 9, 2024; 5:00 p.m., ESPN+	(12)	vs. (13) Wichita State; First round	L 50–64	11–19	12 – Hubbard	8 – 3 tied	5 – Moore	Dickies Arena (1,518); Fort Worth, TX
*Non-conference game. ^{#}Rankings from AP poll. (#) Tournament seedings in parentheses. All times are in Eastern.
