= 2023–24 UAB Blazers women's basketball team =

American college basketball season

2023–24 UAB Blazers women's basketball

WNIT, First Round
- Conference: American Athletic Conference
- Record: 18–14 (9–9 AAC)
- Head coach: Randy Norton (11th season)
- Associate head coach: Taren Martin
- Assistant coaches: Kayla Alexander; Alison Seberger; Kara Rawls
- Home arena: Bartow Arena

2023–24 American Athletic Conference women's basketball standings
	Conf.				Overall
Team	W		L	PCT	W		L	PCT
Tulsa	13	–	5	.722	25	–	10	.714
North Texas	13	–	5	.722	23	–	9	.719
Temple	13	–	5	.722	20	–	12	.625
UTSA	10	–	8	.556	18	–	15	.545
South Florida	10	–	8	.556	19	–	14	.576
Charlotte	9	–	9	.500	16	–	15	.516
UAB	9	–	9	.500	18	–	14	.563
Memphis	9	–	9	.500	13	–	17	.433
East Carolina	9	–	9	.500	19	–	14	.576
Rice †	9	–	9	.500	19	–	15	.559
SMU	8	–	10	.444	14	–	16	.467
Florida Atlantic	6	–	12	.333	11	–	19	.367
Wichita State	5	–	13	.278	10	–	22	.313
Tulane	3	–	15	.167	12	–	20	.375
† 2024 AAC tournament winner

The 2023–24 UAB Blazers women's basketball team represented the University of Alabama at Birmingham during the 2023–24 NCAA Division I women's basketball season. The Blazers, led by 11th-year head coach Randy Norton, played their home games at the Bartow Arena in Birmingham, Alabama as first year members of the American Athletic Conference.

== Previous season ==
The Blazers finished the 2022–23 season 14–17, 5–15 in C-USA play to finish in a tie for tenth (last) place. As the #10 seed in the C-USA tournament, they upset #7 seed North Texas in the first round, before falling to #2 seed Western Kentucky in the quarterfinals. This was the Blazers' final season as members of Conference USA, as they moved to the American Athletic Conference effective July 1, 2023.

== Roster ==
2023–24 UAB Blazers women's basketball team
Players
Coaches

Pos.	#	Name	Height	Year	Previous school	Hometown
G	0	Denim DeShields	5 ft 5 in (1.65 m)	So	La Lumiere School	Atlanta, Georgia
G	1	Mia Moore	5 ft 6 in (1.68 m)	RS So	Mississippi State	Alpharetta, Georgia
G	4	Desiree Ware	5 ft 8 in (1.73 m)	So	Minnetonka High School	Brooklyn Park, Minnesota
G/F	5	Amiya Payne	6 ft 0 in (1.83 m)	RS So	Middle Tennessee	Trussville, Alabama
G	10	Tenley Dowell	6 ft 0 in (1.83 m)	GS	Butler	Morton, Illinois
G	11	Genevive Wedemeyer	5 ft 8 in (1.73 m)	Fr	Putnam Science Academy	Hamburg, Germany
F	12	Molly Moffitt	6 ft 1 in (1.85 m)	So	Putnam Science Academy	Seattle, Washington
F	13	Valentina Monzo	6 ft 2 in (1.88 m)	Jr	McCook Community College	Santiago, Chile
G	21	Maddie Walsh	6 ft 2 in (1.88 m)	Sr	Arrowhead Union High School	Hartland, Wisconsin
G	22	Ashton Elley	5 ft 10 in (1.78 m)	So	Little Rock Christian Academy	Little Rock, Arkansas
F	23	Jade Weathersby	6 ft 2 in (1.88 m)	Fr	Brookwood High School	Aurora, Colorado
F	24	Tracey Bershers	6 ft 2 in (1.88 m)	RS So	Oklahoma State	Fort Smith, Arkansas
G	32	Kylee Schneringer	5 ft 11 in (1.8 m)	Sr	Normal Community High School	Normal, Illinois
F	33	Sara Bershers	6 ft 0 in (1.83 m)	Sr	UT Rio Grande Valley	Fort Smith, Arkansas

Head coach

- Randy Norton (Iowa)

Assistant coach(es)

- Taren Martin (Illinois State)
- Kayla Alexander (UAB)
- Alison Seberger (Illinois State)
- Kara Rawls (UAB)

Legend

- (C) Team captain
- (S) Suspended
- (I) Ineligible
- (W) Walk-on
- Injured
- Current redshirt

Roster
Last update: December 13, 2023

== Schedule and results ==
Date time, TV	Rank^{#}	Opponent^{#}	Result	Record	High points	High rebounds	High assists	Site (attendance) city, state
Exhibition
November 1, 2023*; 6:00 pm		Shorter	W 71–60	–	15 – Schneringer	12 – Weathersby	3 – DeShields	Bartow Arena (155); Birmingham, AL
Non-conference regular season
November 6, 2023*; 2:00 pm, ESPN+		Alabama A&M	W 70–63	1–0	27 – Moore	9 – T. Bershers	6 – DeShields	Bartow Arena (157); Birmingham, AL
November 13, 2023*; 6:00 pm, ESPN+		Western Carolina	W 81–56	2–0	20 – T. Bershers	13 – Weathersby	7 – DeShields	Bartow Arena (125); Birmingham, AL
November 18, 2023*; 8:15 pm		vs. Eastern Kentucky; Great Alaska Shootout semifinals	L 64–68	2–1	21 – Moore	13 – Moore	4 – Moore	Alaska Airlines Center (1,613); Anchorage, AK
November 19, 2023*; 8:15 pm		at Alaska Anchorage; Great Alaska Shootout 3rd place game	W 63–52	3–1	11 – Moore	9 – Walsh	9 – DeShields	Alaska Airlines Center (1,044); Anchorage, AK
November 25, 2023*; 12:00 pm, ESPN+		Valparaiso	W 78–68	4–1	21 – Moore	9 – Moore	7 – DeShields	Bartow Arena (159); Birmingham, AL
November 27, 2023*; 6:00 pm, ESPN+		Jacksonville State	W 85–78 ^{OT}	5–1	27 – Moore	14 – Moore	4 – Moore	Bartow Arena (289); Birmingham, AL
November 29, 2023*; 6:00 pm, ESPN+		Mississippi Valley State	W 88–56	6–1	17 – Elley	11 – Moore	9 – DeShields	Bartow Arena (310); Birmingham, AL
December 3, 2023*; 2:30 pm, ESPN+		Auburn	L 62–72	6–2	17 – Weathersby	9 – Tied	3 – DeShields	Bartow Arena (861); Birmingham, AL
December 9, 2023*; 1:00 pm, ESPN+		at Nicholls	W 73–62	7–2	19 – Moore	12 – Moore	7 – DeShields	Stopher Gymnasium (344); Thibodaux, LA
December 12, 2023*; 12:00 pm, ESPN+		South Carolina State	W 69–54	8–2	21 – Moore	12 – Moore	8 – DeShields	Bartow Arena (289); Birmingham, AL
December 20, 2023*; 12:00 pm, ESPN+		vs. Wagner; Hawk Classic	W 79–39	9–2	17 – Moore	11 – Moore	5 – Moore	Hagan Arena (113); Philadelphia, PA
December 21, 2023*; 12:00 pm, ESPN+		at Saint Joseph's; Hawk Classic	L 57–63	9–3	14 – Moore	11 – Moore	2 – T. Bershers	Hagan Arena (434); Philadelphia, PA
AAC regular season
December 30, 2023; 12:00 pm, ESPN+		at Florida Atlantic	W 65–53	10–3 (1–0)	16 – DeSheilds	9 – Tied	4 – Tied	Eleanor R. Baldwin Arena (346); Boca Raton, FL
January 3, 2024; 6:00 pm, ESPN+		Memphis	W 65–63	11–3 (2–0)	20 – DeShields	17 – Moore	4 – DeShields	Bartow Arena (489); Birmingham, AL
January 7, 2024; 12:00 pm, ESPN+		at Charlotte	L 69–91	11–4 (2–1)	18 – T. Bershers	7 – Moffitt	6 – DeShields	Dale F. Halton Arena (624); Charlotte, NC
January 10, 2024; 5:00 pm, ESPN+		at East Carolina	W 73–64	12–4 (3–1)	24 – Walsh	10 – Weathersby	11 – DeShields	Williams Arena (1,114); Greenville, NC
January 14, 2024; 2:00 pm, ESPN+		SMU	W 84–75	13–4 (4–1)	31 – DeShields	10 – Moore	5 – DeShields	Bartow Arena (491); Birmingham, AL
January 21, 2024; 1:00 pm, ESPN+		UTSA	W 54–53	14–4 (5–1)	22 – DeShields	7 – DeShields	3 – DeShields	Bartow Arena (322); Birmingham, AL
January 25, 2024; 6:00 pm, ESPN+		at Wichita State	W 83–81 ^{OT}	15–4 (6–1)	23 – DeShields	15 – Moore	7 – Moore	Charles Koch Arena (1,092); Wichita, KS
January 28, 2024; 2:00 pm, ESPN+		at North Texas	L 72–87	15–5 (6–2)	15 – Tied	6 – T. Bershers	3 – DeShields	The Super Pit (1,592); Denton, TX
January 31, 2024; 6:00 pm, ESPN+		Florida Atlantic	W 83–72	16–5 (7–2)	18 – Schneringer	6 – Elley	3 – Tied	Bartow Arena (516); Birmingham, AL
February 3, 2024; 4:00 pm, ESPN+		South Florida	L 69–72	16–6 (7–3)	19 – Moore	5 – Walsh	5 – DeShields	Bartow Arena (508); Birmingham, AL
February 7, 2024; 6:00 pm, ESPN+		at Tulane	W 94–77	17–6 (8–3)	28 – Walsh	12 – Moore	10 – DeShields	Devlin Fieldhouse (855); New Orleans, LA
February 11, 2024; 1:00 pm, ESPN+		at UTSA	L 58–76	17–7 (8–4)	12 – Schneringer	7 – Elley	3 – DeShields	Convocation Center (738); San Antonio, TX
February 14, 2024; 6:00 pm, ESPN+		Temple	L 72–86	17–8 (8–5)	22 – Moore	11 – Moore	4 – Moore	Bartow Arena (417); Birmingham, AL
February 17, 2024; 1:00 pm, ESPN+		Rice	W 87–74	18–8 (9–5)	22 – Moore	9 – Moore	8 – DeShields	Bartow Arena (927); Birmingham, AL
February 21, 2024; 6:30 pm, ESPN+		at Tulsa	L 72–84	18–9 (9–6)	17 – Tied	8 – Moore	9 – DeShields	Reynolds Center (1,058); Tulsa, OK
February 24, 2024; 2:00 pm, ESPN+		North Texas	L 77–95	18–10 (9–7)	28 – DeShields	7 – Bershers	4 – Schneringer	Bartow Arena (516); Birmingham, AL
March 2, 2024; 2:00 pm, ESPN+		at Memphis	L 61–82	18–11 (9–8)	17 – DeShields	9 – Moore	7 – DeShields	Elma Roane Fieldhouse (1,131); Memphis, TN
March 5, 2024; 6:00 pm, ESPN+		Wichita State	L 65–68	18–12 (9–9)	16 – Moore	12 – Moore	6 – DeShields	Bartow Arena; Birmingham, AL
AAC Women's Tournament
March 10, 2024; 6:00 pm, ESPN+	(7)	vs. (10) Rice; Second Round	L 56–71	18–13	20 – DeShields	11 – Weathersby	6 – DeShields	Dickies Arena (1,483); Fort Worth, TX
WNIT
March 20, 2024*; 6:00 pm		at Southern Miss; First Round	L 74–79	18–14	19 – Weathersby	9 – Weathersby	6 – Moore	Reed Green Coliseum (1,130); Hattiesburg, MS
*Non-conference game. ^{#}Rankings from AP Poll. (#) Tournament seedings in parentheses. All times are in Central.
