= 2023–24 Rice Owls women's basketball team =

American college basketball season

2023–24 Rice Owls women's basketball

AAC Tournament Champions

NCAA tournament, First Round
- Conference: American Athletic Conference
- Record: 19–15 (9–9 AAC)
- Head coach: Lindsay Edmonds (3rd season)
- Assistant coaches: Lakevia Boykin; Nick Grant; Danyelle Grant
- Home arena: Tudor Fieldhouse

2023–24 American Athletic Conference women's basketball standings
| | Conf. | | | | Overall |
| Team | W | | L | PCT | W | | L | PCT |
|---|---|---|---|---|---|---|---|---|
| Tulsa | 13 | – | 5 | .722 | 25 | – | 10 | .714 |
| North Texas | 13 | – | 5 | .722 | 23 | – | 9 | .719 |
| Temple | 13 | – | 5 | .722 | 20 | – | 12 | .625 |
| UTSA | 10 | – | 8 | .556 | 18 | – | 15 | .545 |
| South Florida | 10 | – | 8 | .556 | 19 | – | 14 | .576 |
| Charlotte | 9 | – | 9 | .500 | 16 | – | 15 | .516 |
| UAB | 9 | – | 9 | .500 | 18 | – | 14 | .563 |
| Memphis | 9 | – | 9 | .500 | 13 | – | 17 | .433 |
| East Carolina | 9 | – | 9 | .500 | 19 | – | 14 | .576 |
| Rice † | 9 | – | 9 | .500 | 19 | – | 15 | .559 |
| SMU | 8 | – | 10 | .444 | 14 | – | 16 | .467 |
| Florida Atlantic | 6 | – | 12 | .333 | 11 | – | 19 | .367 |
| Wichita State | 5 | – | 13 | .278 | 10 | – | 22 | .313 |
| Tulane | 3 | – | 15 | .167 | 12 | – | 20 | .375 |
† 2024 AAC tournament winner

The 2023–24 Rice Owls women's basketball team represented Rice University during the 2023–24 NCAA Division I women's basketball season. The Owls, led by third-year head coach Lindsay Edmonds, played their home games at Tudor Fieldhouse in Houston, Texas as first year members of the American Athletic Conference.

== Previous season ==
The Owls finished the 2022–23 season 23–9, 13–7 in C-USA play to finish in third place. As the #3 seed in the C-USA tournament and receiving a first-round bye, they were upset by #6 seed UTSA in the quarterfinals. They received an at-large bid into the WNIT, where they defeated BYU in the first round, before falling to Oregon in the second round. This was the Owls' final season as members of Conference USA, as they moved to the American Athletic Conference effective July 1, 2023.

== Roster ==
2023–24 Rice Owls women's basketball team
Players
Coaches

| Pos. | # | Name | Height | Year | Previous school | Hometown |
|---|---|---|---|---|---|---|
| F | 1 | Malia Fisher | 6 ft 2 in (1.88 m) | Jr | Hebron Christian Academy | Dacula, Georgia |
| G | 2 | Emily Klaczek | 5 ft 8 in (1.73 m) | Jr | UAB | Hoffman Estates, Illinois |
| G | 4 | Pace Rickard | 5 ft 6 in (1.68 m) | Fr | Grand Rapids Christian High School | Grand Rapids, Michigan |
| G | 5 | Destiny Jackson | 5 ft 9 in (1.75 m) | Sr | Mansfield Timberview High School | Mansfield, Texas |
| G | 11 | Dominique Ennis | 5 ft 9 in (1.75 m) | So | King's Christian Collegiate | Fort Erie, Ontario |
| G | 12 | Layla Conley | 5 ft 8 in (1.73 m) | Fr | John Marshall Harlan High School | San Antonio, Texas |
| G | 14 | Maya Bokunewicz | 6 ft 0 in (1.83 m) | Jr | State College Area High School | State College, Pennsylvania |
| G | 20 | Hailey Adams | 6 ft 1 in (1.85 m) | RS Fr | Tom C. Clark High School | San Antonio, Texas |
| G/F | 23 | Kennedy Clifton | 6 ft 0 in (1.83 m) | So | Bishop Ireton High School | Upper Marlboro, Maryland |
| G | 24 | Ashlyn Zhang | 5 ft 7 in (1.7 m) | So | Flintridge Preparatory School | South Pasadena, California |
| G | 30 | Jazzy Owens-Barnett | 5 ft 7 in (1.7 m) | So | Frisco Liberty High School | Plano, Texas |
| G | 32 | Trinity Gooden | 5 ft 10 in (1.78 m) | Jr | Choctaw High School | Midwest City, Oklahoma |
| C | 33 | Fatou Samb | 6 ft 4 in (1.93 m) | Sr | California | Houston, Texas |
| C | 35 | Sussy Ngulefac | 6 ft 3 in (1.91 m) | Jr | Samford | Lilburn, Georgia |
| C | 44 | Shelby Hayes | 6 ft 2 in (1.88 m) | So | Cedar Park High School | Cedar Park, Texas |

Head coach

- Lindsay Edmonds (Appalachian State)

Assistant coach(es)

- Lakevia Boykin (Wake Forest)
- Nick Grant (Baylor)
- Danyelle Grant (Utah State)

Legend

- (C) Team captain
- (S) Suspended
- (I) Ineligible
- (W) Walk-on
- Injured
- Current redshirt

Roster
Last update: December 15, 2023

== Schedule and results ==
| Date time, TV | Rank^{#} | Opponent^{#} | Result | Record | High points | High rebounds | High assists | Site (attendance) city, state |
Exhibition
| November 1, 2023*; 7:00 pm | | Angelo State | W 101–47 | – | 26 – Klaczek | 8 – Samb | 5 – Jackson | Tudor Fieldhouse; Houston, TX |
Non-conference regular season
| November 6, 2023*; 7:00 pm, ESPN+ | | Houston Christian | W 70–38 | 1–0 | 14 – Ennis | 10 – Fisher | 3 – Jackson | Tudor Fieldhouse (622); Houston, TX |
| November 9, 2023*; 7:00 pm, ESPN+ | | at Abilene Christian | W 69–58 | 2–0 | 13 – 2 Tied | 6 – Fisher | 3 – Klaczek | Moody Coliseum (1,040); Abilene, TX |
| November 12, 2023*; 1:00 pm, ESPN+ | | at TCU | L 42–67 | 2–1 | 11 – Ennis | 5 – Samb | 2 – 3 Tied | Schollmaier Arena (1,788); Fort Worth, TX |
| November 16, 2023*; 7:00 pm, ESPN+ | | Georgia Tech | L 75–78 | 2–2 | 13 – Jackson | 7 – 2 Tied | 3 – Klaczek | Tudor Fieldhouse (1,088); Houston, TX |
| November 19, 2023*; 2:00 pm, ESPN+ | | Saint Mary's | W 73–62 | 3–2 | 26 – Bokunewicz | 9 – Fisher | 5 – Fisher | Tudor Fieldhouse (541); Houston, TX |
| November 25, 2023*; 2:00 pm, ESPN+ | | at Stephen F. Austin | L 56–67 | 3–3 | 12 – Jackson | 7 – Hayes | 2 – 3 Tied | William R. Johnson Coliseum (751); Nacogdoches, TX |
| November 29, 2023*; 7:00 pm, ESPN+ | | Texas Southern | W 74–44 | 4–3 | 25 – Ennis | 7 – Hayes | 5 – Ennis | Tudor Fieldhouse (591); Houston, TX |
| December 2, 2023*; 1:00 pm, ESPN+ | | at Texas A&M–Corpus Christi | W 84–56 | 5–3 | 14 – Ennis | 9 – Fisher | 5 – Hayes | Dugan Wellness Center (824); Corpus Christi, TX |
| December 9, 2023*; 2:00 pm, ESPN+ | | No. 23 Gonzaga | L 72–80 | 5–4 | 16 – Jackson | 6 – Hayes | 3 – 2 Tied | Tudor Fieldhouse (1,367); Houston, TX |
| December 16, 2023*; 2:00 pm, ESPN+ | | Prairie View A&M | W 85–59 | 6–4 | 14 – Owens-Barnett | 8 – Hayes | 5 – Gooden | Tudor Fieldhouse (765); Houston, TX |
| December 20, 2023*; 1:00 pm, ESPN+ | | at Houston; Rivalry | L 63–71 ^{OT} | 6–5 | 16 – Ennis | 10 – Fisher | 4 – Jackson | Fertitta Center (1,033); Houston, TX |
AAC regular season
| January 3, 2024; 7:00 pm, ESPN+ | | Wichita State | W 76–64 | 7–5 (1–0) | 17 – Ennis | 8 – Adams | 3 – 2 Tied | Fertitta Center (424); Houston, TX |
| January 7, 2024; 2:00 pm, ESPN+ | | at SMU | W 65–63 | 8–5 (2–0) | 17 – Jackson | 10 – Fisher | 7 – Jackson | Moody Coliseum (985); University Park, TX |
| January 11, 2024; 7:00 pm, ESPN+ | | Charlotte | L 54–61 | 8–6 (2–1) | 14 – Fisher | 12 – Jackson | 2 – 2 Tied | Tudor Fieldhouse (697); Houston, TX |
| January 14, 2024; 12:00 pm, ESPNU | | South Florida | W 67–64 | 9–6 (3–1) | 23 – Fisher | 13 – Fisher | 6 – Jackson | Tudor Fieldhouse (893); Houston, TX |
| January 17, 2024; 10:00 am, ESPN+ | | at East Carolina | W 80–67 | 10–6 (4–1) | 19 – Ennis | 10 – Fisher | 7 – Jackson | Williams Arena (5,552); Greenville, NC |
| January 20, 2024; 2:00 pm, ESPN+ | | at Tulane | W 61–44 | 11–6 (5–1) | 16 – Ennis | 6 – Bokunewicz | 5 – Jackson | Devlin Fieldhouse (982); New Orleans, LA |
| January 24, 2024; 6:30 pm, ESPN+ | | at Tulsa | L 65–70 | 11–7 (5–2) | 17 – 2 Tied | 9 – Klaczek | 3 – Ennis | Reynolds Center (1,768); Tulsa, OK |
| January 27, 2024; 2:00 pm, ESPN+ | | Memphis | L 66–73 | 11–8 (5–3) | 20 – Jackson | 12 – Adams | 3 – 2 Tied | Tudor Fieldhouse (841); Houston, TX |
| January 31, 2024; 7:00 pm, ESPN+ | | SMU | W 69–60 | 12–8 (6–3) | 19 – Ngulefac | 9 – Adams | 7 – Jackson | Tudor Fieldhouse (804); Houston, TX |
| February 3, 2024; 12:00 pm, ESPN+ | | at Florida Atlantic | L 63–68 | 12–9 (6–4) | 16 – Jackson | 7 – Ennis | 3 – Owens-Barnett | Eleanor R. Baldwin Arena (484); Boca Raton, FL |
| February 7, 2024; 6:00 pm, ESPN+ | | at South Florida | W 69–59 | 13–9 (7–4) | 21 – Owens-Barnett | 7 – Ennis | 4 – Jackson | Yuengling Center (3,005); Tampa, FL |
| February 10, 2024; 5:00 pm, ESPN+ | | Tulsa | W 78–66 | 14–9 (8–4) | 17 – 2 Tied | 12 – Adams | 4 – 2 Tied | Tudor Fieldhouse (814); Houston, TX |
| February 14, 2024; 7:00 pm, ESPN+ | | East Carolina | W 75–57 | 15–9 (9–4) | 22 – Fisher | 9 – Adams | 5 – Owens-Barnett | Tudor Fieldhouse (623); Houston, TX |
| February 17, 2024; 1:00 pm, ESPN+ | | at UAB | L 74–87 | 15–10 (9–5) | 20 – Fisher | 8 – Adams | 6 – Jackson | Bartow Arena (927); Birmingham, AL |
| February 20, 2024; 7:00 pm, ESPN+ | | at Memphis | L 74–79 ^{OT} | 15–11 (9–6) | 21 – Ennis | 6 – Ennis | 5 – Fisher | Elma Roane Fieldhouse (881); Memphis, TN |
| February 25, 2024; 2:00 pm, ESPN+ | | Temple | L 66–75 | 15–12 (9–7) | 24 – Fisher | 9 – Jackson | 6 – Jackson | Tudor Fieldhouse (1,109); Houston, TX |
| March 2, 2024; 2:00 pm, ESPN+ | | North Texas | L 54–63 | 15–13 (9–8) | 13 – Ngulefac | 10 – Klaczek | 7 – Jackson | Tudor Fieldhouse (1,071); Houston, TX |
| March 5, 2024; 6:30 pm, ESPN+ | | at UTSA | L 52–60 | 15–14 (9–9) | 30 – Fisher | 12 – Fisher | 2 – 3 Tied | Convocation Center (1,252); San Antonio, TX |
AAC tournament
| March 10, 2024; 6:00 pm, ESPN+ | (10) | vs. (7) UAB; Second Round | W 71–56 | 16–14 | 20 – Fisher | 9 – Ngulefac | 4 – 2 Tied | Dickies Arena (1,483); Fort Worth, TX |
| March 11, 2024; 6:00 pm, ESPN+ | (10) | vs. (2) North Texas; Quarterfinals | W 61–59 | 17–14 | 16 – Jackson | 10 – Fisher | 6 – Jackson | Dickies Arena (1,602); Fort Worth, TX |
| March 12, 2024; 8:00 pm, ESPN+ | (10) | vs. (3) Temple; Semifinals | W 60–57 | 18–14 | 17 – Fisher | 5 – 3 Tied | 4 – 2 Tied | Dickies Arena (1,520); Fort Worth, TX |
| March 13, 2024; 6:00 pm, ESPNU | (10) | vs. (9) East Carolina; Championship | W 61–41 | 19–14 | 15 – Ngulefac | 11 – Ngulefac | 4 – 2 Tied | Dickies Arena (2,682); Fort Worth, TX |
NCAA Tournament
| March 22, 2024; 3:00 pm, ESPN | (14 A2) | at (3 A2) No. 8 LSU; First Round | L 60–70 | 19–15 | 15 – Jackson | 5 – Fisher | 5 – Gooden | Pete Maravich Assembly Center (12,957); Baton Rouge, LA |
*Non-conference game. ^{#}Rankings from AP Poll. (#) Tournament seedings in parentheses. All times are in Central.
