= 2023–24 North Texas Mean Green women's basketball team =

American college basketball season

2023–24 North Texas Mean Green women's basketball
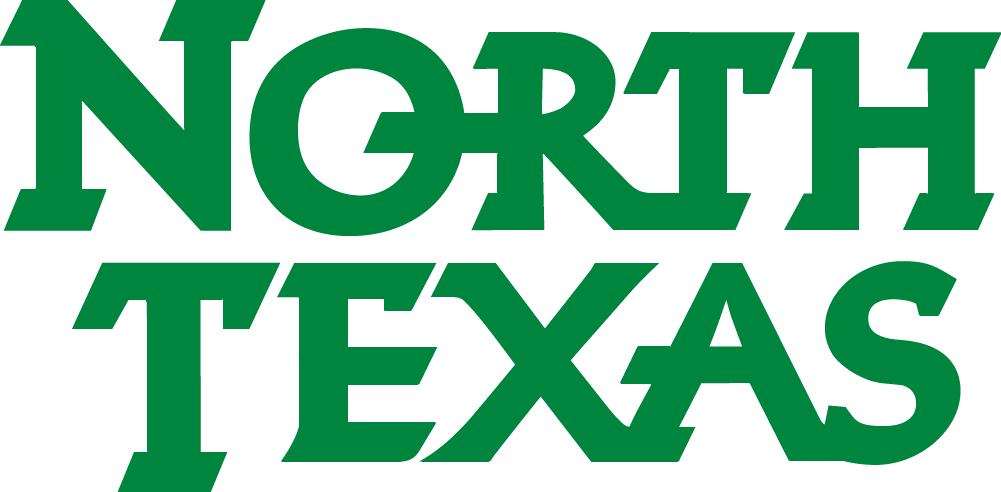

AAC regular season co-champions

WBIT, First Round
- Conference: American Athletic Conference
- Record: 23–9 (13–5 AAC)
- Head coach: Jason Burton (1st season)
- Associate head coach: Britney Brown
- Assistant coaches: Dr. Leah Foster; Durmon Jennings; Princess Davis
- Home arena: The Super Pit

2023–24 American Athletic Conference women's basketball standings
	Conf.				Overall
Team	W		L	PCT	W		L	PCT
Tulsa	13	–	5	.722	25	–	10	.714
North Texas	13	–	5	.722	23	–	9	.719
Temple	13	–	5	.722	20	–	12	.625
UTSA	10	–	8	.556	18	–	15	.545
South Florida	10	–	8	.556	19	–	14	.576
Charlotte	9	–	9	.500	16	–	15	.516
UAB	9	–	9	.500	18	–	14	.563
Memphis	9	–	9	.500	13	–	17	.433
East Carolina	9	–	9	.500	19	–	14	.576
Rice †	9	–	9	.500	19	–	15	.559
SMU	8	–	10	.444	14	–	16	.467
Florida Atlantic	6	–	12	.333	11	–	19	.367
Wichita State	5	–	13	.278	10	–	22	.313
Tulane	3	–	15	.167	12	–	20	.375
† 2024 AAC tournament winner

The 2023–24 North Texas Mean Green women's basketball team represented the University of North Texas during the 2023–24 NCAA Division I women's basketball season. The Mean Green, led by first-year head coach Jason Burton, played their home games at the UNT Coliseum in Denton, Texas as first year members of the American Athletic Conference.

== Previous season ==
The Mean Green finished the 2022–23 season 11–20, 8–12 in C-USA play to finish in seventh place. As the #7 seed in the C-USA tournament, they were upset by #10 seed UAB in the first round. This was the Mean Green's final season as members of Conference USA, as they moved to the American Athletic Conference effective July 1, 2023.

On March 20, 2023, it was announced that head coach Jalie Mitchell would be leaving the program after eight seasons at the helm. A week later, on March 27, the school hired Texas A&M–Commerce head coach Jason Burton as the Mean Green's new head coach.

== Roster ==
2023–24 North Texas Mean Green women's basketball team
Players
Coaches

Pos.	#	Name	Height	Year	Previous school	Hometown
F	1	Sophie Benharouga	6 ft 1 in (1.85 m)	Jr	Morehead State	Grenoble, France
G	2	Ereauna Hardaway	5 ft 8 in (1.73 m)	So	Jonesboro High School	Jonesboro, Arkansas
G	3	Desiree Wooten	5 ft 8 in (1.73 m)	RS Fr	Mansfield Timberview High School	Dallas, Texas
G	4	Jaaucklyn Moore	5 ft 8 in (1.73 m)	Sr	Incarnate Word	Round Rock, Texas
G	5	Breanna Davis	5 ft 9 in (1.75 m)	So	Red Oak High School	Red Oak, Texas
F	10	DesiRay Kernal	6 ft 0 in (1.83 m)	GS	Texas A&M–Commerce	Newton, Kansas
G	11	Jahcelyn Hartfield	5 ft 11 in (1.8 m)	RS Fr	South Grand Prairie High School	Grand Prairie, Texas
G	12	Dyani Robinson	5 ft 7 in (1.7 m)	GS	Texas A&M–Commerce	Cypress, Texas
G	14	Maddie Cleary	5 ft 10 in (1.78 m)	Sr	Prosper High School	Prosper, Texas
G	20	Shamaryah Duncan	5 ft 11 in (1.8 m)	Sr	Wichita State	Waco, Texas
F	21	Jaylen Mallard	6 ft 2 in (1.88 m)	Sr	South Alabama	Little Rock, Arkansas
G/F	23	Shadasia Brackens	5 ft 11 in (1.8 m)	Fr	Fairfield High School	Fairfield, Texas
F	24	Tommisha Lampkin	6 ft 2 in (1.88 m)	Sr	Mansfield Summit High School	Mansfield, Texas
F	35	Aniyah Johnson	6 ft 2 in (1.88 m)	Jr	Red Oak High School	Killeen, Texas

Head coach

- Jason Burton (Austin College)

Assistant coach(es)

- Britney Brown (Oklahoma)
- Dr. Leah Foster (St. Edward's)
- Durmon Jennings (Indianapolis)
- Princess Davis (East Texas A&M)

Legend

- (C) Team captain
- (S) Suspended
- (I) Ineligible
- (W) Walk-on
- Injured
- Current redshirt

Roster
Last update: December 13, 2023

== Schedule and results ==
Date time, TV	Rank^{#}	Opponent^{#}	Result	Record	High points	High rebounds	High assists	Site (attendance) city, state
Exhibition
November 2, 2023*; 6:30 pm		Oklahoma Christian	W 100–63	–	18 – Lampkin	9 – Lampkin	5 – Hardaway	The Super Pit (1,428); Denton, TX
Non-conference regular season
November 6, 2023*; 6:30 pm, ESPN+		UNT Dallas	W 117–42	1–0	18 – Moore	11 – Johnson	8 – Hardaway	The Super Pit (1,508); Denton, TX
November 9, 2023*; 6:30 pm, ESPN+		Grambling State	W 83–60	2–0	24 – Moore	11 – Kernal	4 – 2 Tied	The Super Pit (1,645); Denton, TX
November 12, 2023*; 2:00 pm, SECN+		at Texas A&M	L 55–74	2–1	16 – Moore	8 – Lampkin	3 – Hardaway	Reed Arena (3,094); College Station, TX
November 16, 2023*; 6:30 pm, ESPN+		at Stephen F. Austin	W 78–55	3–1	17 – Kernal	14 – Kernal	6 – Robinson	William R. Johnson Coliseum (1,126); Nacogdoches, TX
November 19, 2023*; 1:00 pm, ESPN+		at Southern Illinois	W 79–73	4–1	19 – Lampkin	4 – 2 Tied	5 – Hardaway	Banterra Center (500); Carbondale, IL
November 24, 2023*; 1:00 pm, ESPN+		vs. Samford; Lady Eagle Thanksgiving Classic	W 71–59	5–1	17 – 2 Tied	15 – Kernal	6 – Wooten	Reed Green Coliseum (1,366); Hattiesburg, MS
November 25, 2023*; 8:00 am, ESPN+		vs. North Dakota; Lady Eagle Thanksgiving Classic	W 71–50	6–1	16 – Moore	10 – 2 Tied	3 – Robinson	Reed Green Coliseum (56); Hattiesburg, MS
December 1, 2023*; 6:30 pm, ESPN+		Pepperdine	W 74–57	7–1	28 – Lampkin	9 – Kernal	3 – 3 Tied	The Super Pit (1,549); Denton, TX
December 6, 2023*; 11:00 am, ESPN+		Arkansas–Pine Bluff	W 73–66	8–1	28 – Kernal	12 – Kernal	2 – Wooten	The Super Pit (2,319); Denton, TX
December 9, 2023*; 2:00 pm, ESPN+		Alcorn State	W 84–50	9–1	19 – 2 Tied	10 – Kernal	5 – Robinson	The Super Pit (1,375); Denton, TX
December 17, 2023*; 4:00 pm, ESPN+		at Louisiana	W 71–48	10–1	18 – Kernal	6 – Kernal	4 – 2 Tied	Cajundome (816); Lafayette, LA
December 21, 2023*; 7:00 pm, ESPN+		at Montana State	L 58–71	10–2	18 – Lampkin	6 – Kernal	3 – Wooten	Worthington Arena (1,396); Bozeman, MT
AAC regular season
December 30, 2023; 3:00 pm, ESPN+		at Charlotte	L 64–74	10–3 (0–1)	18 – Lampkin	6 – Lampkin	7 – Hardaway	Dale F. Halton Arena (686); Charlotte, NC
January 2, 2024; 6:00 pm, ESPN+		at Temple	W 74–63	11–3 (1–1)	20 – Lampkin	10 – Lampkin	5 – Duncan	Liacouras Center (871); Philadelphia, PA
January 7, 2024; 2:00 pm, ESPN+		Florida Atlantic	W 86–52	12–3 (2–1)	22 – Robinson	7 – Brackens	5 – Robinson	The Super Pit (1,368); Denton, TX
January 14, 2024; 2:00 pm, ESPN+		Wichita State	W 72–68	13–3 (3–1)	21 – Kernal	9 – Kernal	4 – Robinson	The Super Pit (1,445); Denton, TX
January 17, 2024; 7:00 pm, ESPN+		at SMU	W 76–61	14–3 (4–1)	15 – Kernal	10 – Kernal	4 – Robinson	Moody Coliseum (902); University Park, TX
January 20, 2024; 6:00 pm, ESPN+		at South Florida	W 65–61	15–3 (5–1)	20 – Kernal	8 – Lampkin	4 – Robinson	Yuengling Center (2,516); Tampa, FL
January 24, 2024; 6:30 pm, ESPN+		Tulane	W 77–70 ^{OT}	16–3 (6–1)	19 – Kernal	15 – Lampkin	5 – Kernal	The Super Pit (1,667); Denton, TX
January 28, 2024; 2:00 pm, ESPN+		UAB	W 87–72	17–3 (7–1)	28 – Kernal	9 – Kernal	3 – Kernal	The Super Pit (1,592); Denton, TX
January 31, 2024; 6:30 pm, ESPN+		at UTSA	L 67–75	17–4 (7–2)	18 – Robinson	9 – Robinson	3 – Kernal	Convocation Center (924); San Antonio, TX
February 4, 2024; 2:00 pm, ESPN+		at Tulsa	L 74–79	17–5 (7–3)	29 – Lampkin	13 – Lampkin	5 – Hardaway	Reynolds Center (1,792); Tulsa, OK
February 10, 2024; 2:00 pm, ESPN+		SMU	W 78–65	18–5 (8–3)	22 – Robinson	10 – Lampkin	6 – Robinson	The Super Pit (1,878); Denton, TX
February 14, 2024; 6:00 pm, ESPN+		at Florida Atlantic	W 67–57	19–5 (9–3)	20 – Lampkin	12 – Lampkin	3 – Hardaway	Eleanor R. Baldwin Arena (212); Boca Raton, FL
February 18, 2024; 2:00 pm, ESPN+		UTSA	L 63–66	19–6 (9–4)	16 – Kernal	12 – Kernal	1 – 7 Tied	The Super Pit (1,826); Denton, TX
February 21, 2024; 6:30 pm, ESPN+		Charlotte	L 69–70 ^{OT}	19–7 (9–5)	14 – 2 Tied	12 – Lampkin	5 – Kernal	The Super Pit (1,457); Denton, TX
February 24, 2024; 2:00 pm, ESPN+		at UAB	W 95–77	20–7 (10–5)	25 – Lampkin	13 – Kernal	7 – Kernal	Bartow Arena (516); Birmingham, AL
February 27, 2024; 6:30 pm, ESPN+		East Carolina	W 93–91 ^{4OT}	21–7 (11–5)	23 – Lampkin	19 – Kernal	5 – Kernal	The Super Pit (1,542); Denton, TX
March 2, 2024; 2:00 pm, ESPN+		at Rice	W 63–54	22–7 (12–5)	22 – Kernal	10 – Kernal	5 – Wooten	Tudor Fieldhouse (1,071); Houston, TX
March 5, 2024; 6:30 pm, ESPN+		Memphis	W 78–66	23–7 (13–5)	25 – Kernal	10 – Kernal	3 – 2 Tied	The Super Pit (2,528); Denton, TX
AAC Women's Tournament
March 11, 2024; 6:00 pm, ESPN+	(2)	vs. (10) Rice; Quarterfinals	L 59–61	23–8	15 – Robinson	10 – Lampkin	5 – Kernal	Dickies Arena (1,602); Fort Worth, TX
WBIT
March 21, 2024*; 6:30 pm, ESPN+		at (3) TCU; First Round	L 58–67	23–9	24 – Lampkin	10 – Lampkin	4 – Robinson	Schollmaier Arena (1,634); Fort Worth, TX
*Non-conference game. ^{#}Rankings from AP Poll. (#) Tournament seedings in parentheses. All times are in Central.
