= 2023–24 Wichita State Shockers women's basketball team =

American college basketball season

2023–24 Wichita State Shockers women's basketball
- Conference: American Athletic Conference
- Record: 10–22 (5–13 AAC)
- Head coach: Terry Nooner (1st season)
- Assistant coaches: Antwain Scales; Brooke Costley; Nick Bradford
- Home arena: Charles Koch Arena

2023–24 American Athletic Conference women's basketball standings
	Conf.				Overall
Team	W		L	PCT	W		L	PCT
Tulsa	13	–	5	.722	25	–	10	.714
North Texas	13	–	5	.722	23	–	9	.719
Temple	13	–	5	.722	20	–	12	.625
UTSA	10	–	8	.556	18	–	15	.545
South Florida	10	–	8	.556	19	–	14	.576
Charlotte	9	–	9	.500	16	–	15	.516
UAB	9	–	9	.500	18	–	14	.563
Memphis	9	–	9	.500	13	–	17	.433
East Carolina	9	–	9	.500	19	–	14	.576
Rice †	9	–	9	.500	19	–	15	.559
SMU	8	–	10	.444	14	–	16	.467
Florida Atlantic	6	–	12	.333	11	–	19	.367
Wichita State	5	–	13	.278	10	–	22	.313
Tulane	3	–	15	.167	12	–	20	.375
† 2024 AAC tournament winner

The 2023–24 Wichita State Shockers women's basketball team represented Wichita State University during the 2023–24 NCAA Division I women's basketball season. The Shockers, led by first-year head coach Terry Nooner, played their home games at Charles Koch Arena in Wichita, Kansas as members of the American Athletic Conference (AAC).

The Shockers finished the season 10–22, 5–15 in AAC play, to finish in 13th place. They defeated 12th-seeded Florida Atlantic in the first round of the AAC tournament before falling to fifth seed South Florida in the second round.

== Previous season ==
The Shockers finished the 2022–23 season 18–15, 6–10 in AAC play, to finish in a tie for eighth place. As the #8 seed in the AAC tournament, they defeated #9 seed Temple in the first round and upset top-seeded South Florida in the semifinals, before falling to #4 seed Houston in the semifinals. They received an at-large bid into the WNIT, where they were defeated by Kansas State in the first round.

On April 11, 2023, head coach Keitha Adams announced that she would be leaving the program to re-take the head coaching position at UTEP, the job she held prior to her hiring at Wichita State. On April 17, Kansas associate head coach Terry Nooner was announced as the team's next head coach.

== Roster ==
2023–24 Wichita State Shockers women's basketball team
Players
Coaches

Pos.	#	Name	Height	Year	Previous school	Hometown
G	0	Aniya Bell	5 ft 9 in (1.75 m)	Sr	Fairleigh Dickinson	Washington, D.C.
G	1	DJ McCarty	5 ft 8 in (1.73 m)	Sr	Cedar Hill High School	DeSoto, TX
F	2	Sierra Morrow	6 ft 1 in (1.85 m)	Sr	Miami (OH)	Minneapolis, MN
G	3	Tre'Zure Jobe	5 ft 7 in (1.7 m)	RS Sr	Emporia State	Wichita, KS
F	4	Jayla Murray	6 ft 1 in (1.85 m)	RS So	Florida SouthWestern State	St. Louis, MO
F	5	Ornella Niankan	6 ft 1 in (1.85 m)	Jr	Odessa College	Montreal, QC
F	11	Jordan Jackson	6 ft 0 in (1.83 m)	So	Texas Woman's	Sachse, TX
G	12	Raissa Nsabua	5 ft 10 in (1.78 m)	Jr	Mineral Area College	Ottawa, ON
C	13	Ella Anciaux	6 ft 4 in (1.93 m)	Jr	Kapaun Mt. Carmel High School	Wichita, KS
F	14	Carla Budane	6 ft 0 in (1.83 m)	RS So	Escola Secundária Vergílio Ferreira	Maputo, Mozambique
F	15	Sophia Goncalves	6 ft 4 in (1.93 m)	Fr	Oakland Tech High School	Oakland, CA
G	22	Ambah Kowcun	5 ft 10 in (1.78 m)	Sr	North Dakota State College of Science	Adelaide, Australia
F	23	Daniela Abies	6 ft 0 in (1.83 m)	So	Salesianos San Bartolomé	Málaga, Spain
G	25	Salese Blow	5 ft 11 in (1.8 m)	Fr	Plano Senior High School	Murphy, TX
G	45	Jeniah Thompson	5 ft 9 in (1.75 m)	Sr	John A. Logan College	Carterville, IL

Head coach

- Terry Nooner (Kansas)

Assistant coach(es)

- Antwain Scales (Fort Hays State)
- Brooke Costley (Emporia State)
- Nick Bradford (Kansas)

Legend

- (C) Team captain
- (S) Suspended
- (I) Ineligible
- (W) Walk-on
- Injured
- Current redshirt

Roster
Last update: December 17, 2023

== Schedule and results ==
Date time, TV	Rank^{#}	Opponent^{#}	Result	Record	High points	High rebounds	High assists	Site (attendance) city, state
Exhibition
November 1, 2023*; 6:00 p.m.		Missouri Southern	W 75–65	–	22 – Jobe	10 – Abies	4 – McCarty	Charles Koch Arena (1,087); Wichita, KS
Non-conference regular season
November 6, 2023*; 12:00 p.m., ESPN+		at Oklahoma	L 68–92	0–1	19 – McCarty	6 – Abies	2 – Blow	Lloyd Noble Center (2,133); Norman, OK
November 8, 2023*; 11:00 a.m., ESPN+		Presbyterian	W 60–41	1–1	13 – Jobe	9 – Thompson	4 – Thompson	Charles Koch Arena (2,835); Wichita, KS
November 15, 2023*; 6:30 p.m., ESPN+		at Belmont	L 67–75	1–2	16 – Jobe	8 – Abies	2 – Jobe	Curb Event Center (775); Nashville, TN
November 20, 2023*; 6:00 p.m., ESPN+		Omaha	W 92–86	2–2	19 – Blow	8 – 2 tied	5 – Niankan	Charles Koch Arena (1,052); Wichita, KS
November 24, 2023*; 10:00 a.m., FloHoops		vs. Akron; Daytona Beach Classic	W 63–61	3–2	18 – Abies	11 – Abies	4 – Jobe	Ocean Center (200); Daytona Beach, FL
November 25, 2023*; 10:00 a.m., FloHoops		vs. Dayton; Daytona Beach Classic	L 63–74	3–3	20 – Blow	5 – 2 tied	3 – McCarty	Ocean Center (200); Daytona Beach, FL
November 28, 2023*; 6:00 p.m., ESPN+		Southeastern Louisiana	L 36–64	3–4	10 – Jobe	7 – Niankan	3 – Jobe	Charles Koch Arena (1,200); Wichita, KS
December 1, 2023*; 6:00 p.m., ESPN+		Saint Louis	W 78–59	4–4	24 – Jobe	15 – Thompson	5 – Thompson	Charles Koch Arena (1,155); Wichita, KS
December 4, 2023*; 6:00 p.m., ESPN+		Houston Christian	L 44–49	4–5	11 – McCarty	12 – Abies	2 – 3 tied	Charles Koch Arena (1,023); Wichita, KS
December 10, 2023*; 1:00 p.m., ESPN+		Kansas	L 56–76	4–6	12 – 2 tied	8 – Morrow	3 – Jobe	Charles Koch Arena (1,991); Wichita, KS
December 16, 2023*; 1:00 p.m., ESPN+		at Missouri State	L 65–72	4–7	18 – 2 tied	6 – Abies	3 – Jobe	Great Southern Bank Arena (3,001); Springfield, MO
December 20, 2023*; 6:00 p.m., ESPN+		Oral Roberts	L 74–76	4–8	29 – Morrow	9 – Morrow	7 – Jobe	Charles Koch Arena (1,435); Wichita, KS
AAC regular season
December 30, 2023; 2:00 p.m., ESPN+		Tulane	W 63–60	5–8 (1–0)	21 – Jobe	9 – Abies	8 – Jobe	Charles Koch Arena (1,300); Wichita, KS
January 3, 2024; 7:00 p.m., ESPN+		at Rice	L 64–76	5–9 (1–1)	16 – Blow	10 – Jobe	3 – Jobe	Fertitta Center (424); Houston, TX
January 6, 2024; 2:00 p.m., ESPN+		at UTSA	L 60–74	5–10 (1–2)	12 – Abies	12 – Abies	3 – Thompson	Convocation Center (722); San Antonio, TX
January 9, 2024; 6:00 p.m., ESPN+		Temple	L 49–72	5–11 (1–3)	10 – Blow	9 – Murray	3 – Blow	Charles Koch Arena (1,060); Wichita, KS
January 14, 2024; 2:00 p.m., ESPN+		at North Texas	L 68–72	5–12 (1–4)	23 – Blow	11 – Abies	4 – Blow	The Super Pit (1,445); Denton, TX
January 17, 2024; 6:00 p.m., ESPN+		Memphis	W 71–66	6–12 (2–4)	18 – Abies	16 – Abies	3 – 2 tied	Charles Koch Arena (1,133); Wichita, KS
January 20, 2024; 2:00 p.m., ESPN+		at Tulsa	L 70–93	6–13 (2–5)	17 – Abies	10 – Abies	6 – Jobe	Reynolds Center (1,186); Tulsa, OK
January 25, 2024; 6:00 p.m., ESPN+		UAB	L 81–83 ^{OT}	6–14 (2–6)	23 – Abies	10 – Abies	6 – Blow	Charles Koch Arena (1,092); Wichita, KS
January 27, 2024; 6:00 p.m., ESPN+		Florida Atlantic	L 56–63	6–15 (2–7)	16 – Blow	11 – Abies	4 – 2 tied	Charles Koch Arena (1,440); Wichita, KS
January 31, 2024; 6:00 p.m., ESPN+		at Temple	L 65–66	6–16 (2–8)	19 – Abies	14 – Abies	3 – 2 tied	Liacouras Center (835); Philadelphia, PA
February 4, 2024; 2:00 p.m., ESPN+		East Carolina	L 51–72	6–17 (2–9)	13 – Blow	8 – 2 tied	3 – McCarty	Charles Koch Arena (1,500); Wichita, KS
February 10, 2024; 1:00 p.m., ESPN+		at Florida Atlantic	W 67–56	7–17 (3–9)	15 – 2 tied	15 – Abies	4 – 2 tied	Eleanor R. Baldwin Arena (708); Boca Raton, FL
February 13, 2024; 6:00 p.m., ESPN+		at South Florida	L 57–79	7–18 (3–10)	11 – 3 tied	8 – Abies	5 – McCarty	Yuengling Center (3,063); Tampa, FL
February 17, 2024; 2:00 p.m., ESPN+		Tulsa	W 74–65	8–18 (4–10)	26 – McCarty	13 – Abies	5 – McCarty	Charles Koch Arena (1,638); Wichita, KS
February 24, 2024; 3:00 p.m., ESPN+		at Charlotte	L 48–74	8–19 (4–11)	17 – Blow	3 – 2 tied	7 – McCarty	Dale F. Halton Arena (803); Charlotte, NC
February 28, 2024; 6:00 p.m., ESPN+		SMU	L 84–88 ^{OT}	8–20 (4–12)	24 – Blow	13 – Abies	9 – McCarty	Charles Koch Arena (1,231); Wichita, KS
March 2, 2024; 2:00 p.m., ESPN+		UTSA	L 61–68	8–21 (4–13)	18 – Blow	9 – Thompson	4 – 2 tied	Charles Koch Arena (1,223); Wichita, KS
March 5, 2024; 6:00 p.m., ESPN+		at UAB	W 68–65	9–21 (5–13)	21 – Abies	12 – Abies	4 – McCarty	Bartow Arena; Birmingham, AL
AAC tournament
March 9, 2024; 5:00 p.m., ESPN+	(13)	vs. (12) Florida Atlantic; First round	W 64–50	10–21	22 – Abies	22 – Abies	5 – Nsabua	Dickies Arena (1,518); Fort Worth, TX
March 9, 2024; 5:00 p.m., ESPN+	(13)	vs. (5) South Florida; Second round	L 62–69	10–22	20 – Blow	13 – Abies	6 – Abies	Dickies Arena (1,506); Fort Worth, TX
*Non-conference game. ^{#}Rankings from AP poll. (#) Tournament seedings in parentheses. All times are in Central.
