= 2023–24 Charlotte 49ers women's basketball team =

American college basketball season

2023–24 Charlotte 49ers women's basketball
- Conference: American Athletic Conference
- Record: 16–15 (9–9 AAC)
- Head coach: Cara Consuegra (13th season)
- Associate head coach: Cait Wetmore
- Assistant coaches: Deont'a McChester; Ciara Gregory
- Home arena: Dale F. Halton Arena

2023–24 American Athletic Conference women's basketball standings
	Conf.				Overall
Team	W		L	PCT	W		L	PCT
Tulsa	13	–	5	.722	25	–	10	.714
North Texas	13	–	5	.722	23	–	9	.719
Temple	13	–	5	.722	20	–	12	.625
UTSA	10	–	8	.556	18	–	15	.545
South Florida	10	–	8	.556	19	–	14	.576
Charlotte	9	–	9	.500	16	–	15	.516
UAB	9	–	9	.500	18	–	14	.563
Memphis	9	–	9	.500	13	–	17	.433
East Carolina	9	–	9	.500	19	–	14	.576
Rice †	9	–	9	.500	19	–	15	.559
SMU	8	–	10	.444	14	–	16	.467
Florida Atlantic	6	–	12	.333	11	–	19	.367
Wichita State	5	–	13	.278	10	–	22	.313
Tulane	3	–	15	.167	12	–	20	.375
† 2024 AAC tournament winner

The 2023–24 Charlotte 49ers women's basketball team represented the University of North Carolina at Charlotte during the 2023–24 NCAA Division I women's basketball season. The 49ers, led by 13th-year head coach Cara Consuegra, play their home games at Dale F. Halton Arena in Charlotte, North Carolina as first-year members of the American Athletic Conference (AAC).

The 49ers finished the season 16–15, 9–9 in AAC play, to finish in a five-way tie for sixth place. They were upset by last-placed Tulane in the second round of the AAC tournament.

On April 17, 2024, it was announced that head coach Cara Consuegra would be stepping down from her position in order to take the head coaching position at Marquette. On April 25, the school announced that they would be hiring Jackson State head coach Tomekia Reed as the team's new head coach.

== Previous season ==
The 49ers finished the 2022–23 season 12–19, 7–13 in C-USA play, to finish in a tie for eighth place. As the #9 seed in the Conference USA tournament, they defeated #8 seed FIU in the first round before falling to top seed and eventual tournament champions Middle Tennessee in the quarterfinals. This was the 49ers' final season as members of Conference USA, as they moved to the American Athletic Conference effective July 1, 2023.

== Roster ==
2023–24 Charlotte 49ers women's basketball team
Players
Coaches

Pos.	#	Name	Height	Year	Previous school	Hometown
G	0	Aylesha Wade	5 ft 6 in (1.68 m)	Jr	Clover High School	York, SC
G	1	Jewel Watkins	5 ft 10 in (1.78 m)	Jr	Coppin State	Columbus, OH
G	3	Tamia Davis	5 ft 7 in (1.7 m)	Sr	Kansas	Raleigh, NC
G	5	Nia Young	6 ft 0 in (1.83 m)	RS So	Leesville Road High School	Raleigh, NC
F	9	Anna Ekerstedt	6 ft 2 in (1.88 m)	RS Jr	Rider	Varberg, Sweden
G	10	Dazia Lawrence	5 ft 4 in (1.63 m)	RS Jr	Mallard Creek High School	Greenville, NC
G	12	Imani Smith	5 ft 8 in (1.73 m)	Jr	Gulf Coast State	Hiram, GA
F	13	Tracey Hueston	6 ft 2 in (1.88 m)	Sr	Pittsburgh	Roanoke, VA
G	20	Jacee Busick	6 ft 1 in (1.85 m)	Sr	Glenn High School	Kernersville, NC
G/F	22	Caroline Thiel	6 ft 0 in (1.83 m)	Fr	Rocky Mount High School	Rocky Mount, NC
G	23	Olivia Porter	5 ft 8 in (1.73 m)	So	Michigan State	Chapel Hill, NC
F	24	Fatou Diakite	6 ft 3 in (1.91 m)	Fr	Niagara Prep	Abidjan, Ivory Coast
F	31	Keanna Rembert	6 ft 2 in (1.88 m)	RS So	Illinois	Raleigh, NC

Head coach

- Cara Consuegra (Iowa)

Assistant coach(es)

- Cait Wetmore (Adelphi)
- Deont'a McChester (Keuka)
- Ciara Gregory (Charlotte)

Legend

- (C) Team captain
- (S) Suspended
- (I) Ineligible
- (W) Walk-on
- Injured
- Current redshirt

Roster
Last update: December 14, 2023

== Schedule and results ==
Date time, TV	Rank^{#}	Opponent^{#}	Result	Record	High points	High rebounds	High assists	Site (attendance) city, state
Non-conference regular season
November 6, 2023*; 6:00 p.m., ACCN		at NC State	L 43–84	0–1	12 – Hueston	7 – Lawrence	2 – Lawrence	Reynolds Coliseum (4,496); Raleigh, NC
November 10, 2023*; 2:00 p.m., ESPN+		Tennessee State	W 84–35	1–1	18 – Lawrence	11 – Busick	7 – Busick	Dale F. Halton Arena (1,056); Charlotte, NC
November 14, 2023*; 6:30 p.m., ESPN+		UNC Asheville	W 67–51	2–1	26 – Lawrence	13 – Busick	5 – Porter	Dale F. Halton Arena (722); Charlotte, NC
November 17, 2023*; 6:30 p.m., ESPN+		Gardner–Webb	W 93–43	3–1	15 – Hueston	6 – 3 tied	5 – Porter	Dale F. Halton Arena (635); Charlotte, NC
November 23, 2023*; 10:00 a.m., FloHoops		vs. Southern Illinois; San Juan Shootout	L 52–55	3–2	32 – Lawrence	6 – 2 tied	2 – Porter	Roberto Clemente Coliseum (250); San Juan, Puerto Rico
November 24, 2023*; 10:00 a.m., FloHoops		vs. West Virginia; San Juan Shootout	L 56–84	3–3	12 – Hueston	5 – Hueston	3 – Wade	Roberto Clemente Coliseum (250); San Juan, Puerto Rico
November 25, 2023*; 12:30 p.m., FloHoops		vs. George Washington; San Juan Shootout	W 50–38	4–3	12 – 2 tied	9 – Diakite	4 – Lawrence	Roberto Clemente Coliseum (250); San Juan, Puerto Rico
November 29, 2023*; 5:30 p.m., ESPN+		Mercer	W 65–58	5–3	22 – Lawrence	6 – Lawrence	4 – Porter	Dale F. Halton Arena (733); Charlotte, NC
December 2, 2023*; 1:00 p.m., ESPN+		at VCU	L 49–57	5–4	17 – Lawrence	8 – Smith	3 – 2 tied	Siegel Center (362); Richmond, VA
December 7, 2023*; 6:00 p.m., ACCNX		at Wake Forest	W 69–58	6–4	21 – Hueston	6 – Rembert	6 – Porter	LJVM Coliseum (971); Winston-Salem, NC
December 18, 2023*; 6:00 p.m., ESPN+		at Charleston Southern	W 65–60	7–4	21 – Lawrence	8 – Rembert	4 – Smith	Buccaneer Field House (143); North Charleston, SC
December 21, 2023*; 2:00 p.m., ESPN+		Davidson	L 56–83	7–5	13 – Porter	8 – Rembert	2 – Porter	Dale F. Halton Arena (1,046); Charlotte, NC
AAC regular season
December 30, 2023; 4:00 p.m., ESPN+		North Texas	W 74–64	8–5 (1–0)	23 – Lawrence	10 – Smith	6 – Smith	Dale F. Halton Arena (686); Charlotte, NC
January 3, 2024; 5:00 p.m., ESPNU		at South Florida	W 66–61 ^{OT}	9–5 (2–0)	26 – Lawrence	6 – 2 tied	4 – Lawrence	Yuengling Center (2,305); Tampa, FL
January 7, 2024; 1:00 p.m., ESPN+		UAB	W 91–69	10–5 (3–0)	30 – Lawrence	9 – Rembert	6 – Lawrence	Dale F. Halton Arena (624); Charlotte, NC
January 11, 2024; 8:00 p.m., ESPN+		at Rice	W 61–54	11–5 (4–0)	24 – Lawrence	8 – 2 tied	4 – Porter	Tudor Fieldhouse (697); Houston, TX
January 14, 2024; 3:00 p.m., ESPN+		at UTSA	L 80–81 ^{2OT}	11–6 (4–1)	27 – Hueston	7 – Smith	6 – Smith	Convocation Center (671); San Antonio, TX
January 17, 2024; 6:30 p.m., ESPN+		Tulane	W 66–64	12–6 (5–1)	19 – Hueston	6 – Rembert	11 – Lawrence	Dale F. Halton Arena (734); Charlotte, NC
January 21, 2024; 1:00 p.m., ESPN+		at Temple	L 68–73	12–7 (5–2)	16 – Lawrence	7 – Smith	4 – Smith	Liacouras Center (1,165); Philadelphia, PA
January 27, 2024; 4:00 p.m., ESPN+		Tulsa	L 55–65	12–8 (5–3)	14 – Lawrence	12 – Rembert	3 – Smith	Dale F. Halton Arena (996); Charlotte, NC
January 31, 2024; 7:00 p.m., ESPN+		at Tulane	L 68–70	12–9 (5–4)	18 – Lawrence	5 – Busick	7 – Lawrence	Devlin Fieldhouse; New Orleans, LA
February 4, 2024; 2:00 p.m., ESPN+		Temple	W 88–81	13–9 (6–4)	29 – Lawrence	10 – Hueston	7 – Porter	Dale F. Halton Arena (1,006); Charlotte, NC
February 7, 2024; 6:30 p.m., ESPN+		Florida Atlantic	L 55–66	13–10 (6–5)	15 – Hueston	7 – Busick	3 – 2 tied	Dale F. Halton Arena (668); Charlotte, NC
February 10, 2024; 2:00 p.m., ESPN+		at East Carolina	L 56–70	13–11 (6–6)	14 – Lawrence	7 – Busick	4 – Porter	Williams Arena (1,363); Greenville, NC
February 14, 2024; 6:30 p.m., ESPN+		Memphis	W 65–56	14–11 (7–6)	30 – Lawrence	9 – Lawrence	3 – Porter	Dale F. Halton Arena (723); Charlotte, NC
February 18, 2024; 5:30 p.m., ESPN+		at SMU	L 49–64	14–12 (7–7)	16 – Lawrence	10 – Lawrence	3 – Busick	Moody Coliseum (1,407); University Park, TX
February 21, 2024; 7:30 p.m., ESPN+		at North Texas	W 70–69 ^{OT}	15–12 (8–7)	26 – Lawrence	8 – Busick	3 – Rembert	The Super Pit (1,457); Denton, TX
February 24, 2024; 4:00 p.m., ESPN+		Wichita State	W 74–48	16–12 (9–7)	22 – Lawrence	10 – Busick	8 – Lawrence	Dale F. Halton Arena (803); Charlotte, NC
March 3, 2024; 2:00 p.m., ESPN+		at Florida Atlantic	L 47–56	16–13 (9–8)	15 – Lawrence	10 – Rembert	4 – Porter	Eleanor R. Baldwin Arena (512); Boca Raton, FL
March 5, 2024; 6:30 p.m., ESPN+		East Carolina	L 66–71	16–14 (9–9)	22 – Rembert	10 – Rembert	5 – Porter	Dale F. Halton Arena (803); Charlotte, NC
AAC tournament
March 10, 2024; 9:00 p.m., ESPN+	(6)	vs. (14) Tulane; Second round	L 52–65	16–15	20 – Lawrence	7 – 2 tied	5 – Porter	Dickies Arena (1,483); Fort Worth, TX
*Non-conference game. ^{#}Rankings from AP poll. (#) Tournament seedings in parentheses. All times are in Eastern.
