= 2023–24 South Florida Bulls women's basketball team =

American college basketball season

2023–24 South Florida Bulls women's basketball
- Conference: American Athletic Conference
- Record: 19–14 (10–8 AAC)
- Head coach: Jose Fernandez (24th season)
- Associate head coach: Michele Woods-Baxter
- Assistant coaches: Danny Hughes; Sheila Boykin; Gina Cerezuela Robuste; Tara Johns
- Home arena: Yuengling Center

2023–24 American Athletic Conference women's basketball standings
	Conf.				Overall
Team	W		L	PCT	W		L	PCT
Tulsa	13	–	5	.722	25	–	10	.714
North Texas	13	–	5	.722	23	–	9	.719
Temple	13	–	5	.722	20	–	12	.625
UTSA	10	–	8	.556	18	–	15	.545
South Florida	10	–	8	.556	19	–	14	.576
Charlotte	9	–	9	.500	16	–	15	.516
UAB	9	–	9	.500	18	–	14	.563
Memphis	9	–	9	.500	13	–	17	.433
East Carolina	9	–	9	.500	19	–	14	.576
Rice †	9	–	9	.500	19	–	15	.559
SMU	8	–	10	.444	14	–	16	.467
Florida Atlantic	6	–	12	.333	11	–	19	.367
Wichita State	5	–	13	.278	10	–	22	.313
Tulane	3	–	15	.167	12	–	20	.375
† 2024 AAC tournament winner

The 2023–24 South Florida Bulls women's basketball team represented the University of South Florida during the 2023–24 NCAA Division I women's basketball season. The Bulls, led by 24th-year head coach Jose Fernandez, played their home games at Yuengling Center in Tampa, Florida as members of the American Athletic Conference.

== Previous season ==
The Bulls finished the 2022–23 season 27–7, 15–1 in AAC play to finish as AAC regular season champions. As the #1 seed in the AAC tournament, they were upset by #8 seed Wichita State in the quarterfinals. They received an at-large bid into the NCAA tournament, receiving the #8 seed in the Greenville 1 Region. They defeated #9 region seed Marquette in the first round, before falling to #1 overall seed South Carolina in the second round.

== Offseason ==
=== Departures ===
South Florida departures
Name	Num	Pos.	Height	Year	Hometown	Reason for departure
Priscilla Williams	2	G	6'2"	Sophomore	Branson, MO	Transferred to Oregon
Elena Tsineke	5	G	5'7"	Senior	Thessaloniki, Greece	Graduated/2023 WNBA draft; selected 20th overall by Washington Mystics
Dulcy Fankam Mendjiadeu	32	F	6'4"	(redshirt) Senior	Nkongsamba, Cameroon	Graduated/2023 WNBA draft; selected 21st overall by Seattle Storm

=== Incoming ===
South Florida incoming transfers
Name	Num	Pos.	Height	Year	Hometown	Previous school
Romi Levy	23	F	6'3"	Junior	Herzliya, Israel	Auburn
Evelien Lutje Schipholt	32	F	6'2"	GS senior	The Hague, Netherlands	California

==== Recruiting ====
There was no recruiting class of 2023.

== Roster ==
2023–24 South Florida Bulls women's basketball team
Players
Coaches

Pos.	#	Name	Height	Year	Previous school	Hometown
F	0	Caitlin McGee	6 ft 1 in (1.85 m)	RS Jr	Ole Miss	Jacksonville, Florida
G	1	Maria Alvarez	5 ft 7 in (1.7 m)	Sr	Miami Country Day School	Bal Harbour, Florida
G	3	Sammie Puisis	6 ft 1 in (1.85 m)	Sr	Florida State	Mason, Ohio
G	5	Vittoria Blasigh	5 ft 9 in (1.75 m)	Fr	SPAR Gran Canaria	Udine, Italy
G	10	Janette Aarnio	5 ft 11 in (1.8 m)	So	Helsinki Basketball Academy	Vantaa, Finland
G	11	Judit Valero Rodriguez	5 ft 11 in (1.8 m)	Fr	Barca	Sant Feliu de Llobregat, Spain
PG	12	Marina Asensio	5 ft 8 in (1.73 m)	So	Segle XXI	Sabadell, Spain
F/C	14	Emma Johansson	6 ft 3 in (1.91 m)	So	Wetterbygden Sparks	Jönköping, Sweden
F	15	Judit Oliva Fernandez	6 ft 2 in (1.88 m)	Fr	Barca	El Prat de Llobregat, Spain
F	20	Daniela Gonzalez	6 ft 0 in (1.83 m)	So	Nativos Valle	Jamundí, Colombia
F	21	L'or Mputu	6 ft 2 in (1.88 m)	Jr	Eastern Florida State College	Kinshasa, DR Congo
PG	22	Aerial Wilson	5 ft 10 in (1.78 m)	RS Sr	Memphis	Dundas, Ontario
F	23	Romi Levy	6 ft 3 in (1.91 m)	Jr	Auburn	Herzliya, Israel
F	24	Evelien Lutje Schipholt	6 ft 2 in (1.88 m)	Sr	California	The Hague, Netherlands
G/F	55	Carla Brito	5 ft 11 in (1.8 m)	So	SPAR Gran Canaria	Las Palmas, Spain

Head coach

- Jose Fernandez (FIU)

Assistant coach(es)

- Michele Woods-Baxter (St. John Fisher)
- Danny Hughes (TCU)
- Sheila Boykin (LSU)
- Gina Cerezuela Robuste (Coker)
- Tara Johns (Lindsey Wilson)

Legend

- (C) Team captain
- (S) Suspended
- (I) Ineligible
- (W) Walk-on
- Injured
- Current redshirt

Roster
Last update: December 13, 2023

== Schedule and results ==
Date time, TV	Rank^{#}	Opponent^{#}	Result	Record	High points	High rebounds	High assists	Site (attendance) city, state
Non-conference regular season
November 6, 2023*; 7:00 pm, ESPN+		UT Arlington	W 76–61	1–0	16 – Gonzalez	7 – 2 Tied	8 – Wilson	Yuengling Center (2,033); Tampa, FL
November 10, 2023*; 4:00 pm, ESPN+		Stetson	W 67–55	2–0	20 – Brito	11 – Brito	6 – Wilson	Yuengling Center (1,711); Tampa, FL
November 13, 2023*; 7:00 pm, ESPN+		Grambling State	W 83–57	3–0	21 – Blasigh	9 – Johansson	5 – Asensio	Yuengling Center (2,061); Tampa, FL
November 16, 2023*; 7:00 pm, SECN+		at Alabama	L 41–70	3–1	18 – Blasigh	11 – Brito	3 – Blasigh	Coleman Coliseum (1,925); Tuscaloosa, AL
November 19, 2023*; 2:00 pm, ESPN+		North Florida	W 56–55	4–1	27 – Blasigh	10 – Brito	8 – Wilson	Yuengling Center (4,534); Tampa, FL
November 23, 2023*; 5:45 pm, ESPN+		vs. High Point; Paradise Jam Reef Division	W 61–32	5–1	12 – Johansson	7 – 2 Tied	3 – 2 Tied	Sports and Fitness Center (1,224); St. Thomas, USVI
November 24, 2023*; 5:45 pm, ESPN+		vs. Arizona State; Paradise Jam Reef Division	L 49–66	5–2	13 – Brito	8 – Brito	2 – 2 Tied	Sports and Fitness Center (1,824); St. Thomas, USVI
November 25, 2023*; 8:00 pm, ESPN+		vs. No. 12 Texas; Paradise Jam Reef Division	L 44–76	5–3	10 – 2 Tied	5 – Asensio	2 – 3 Tied	Sports and Fitness Center (2,424); St. Thomas, USVI
November 30, 2023*; 11:00 am, ESPN+		Charleston Southern	W 81–35	6–3	17 – Lutje Schipholt	11 – Lutje Schipholt	5 – 2 Tied	Yuengling Center (9,574); Tampa, FL
December 10, 2023*; 1:00 pm, ESPN+		Gardner–Webb	W 105–75	7–3	31 – Blasigh	10 – Brito	7 – Asensio	Yuengling Center (2,346); Tampa, FL
December 16, 2023*; 7:00 pm, ESPN+		No. 3 NC State	L 54–66	7–4	11 – Levy	12 – Lutje Schipholt	3 – 2 Tied	Yuengling Center (4,959); Tampa, FL
December 20, 2023*; 1:15 pm, FloHoops		vs. IUPUI; West Palm Beach Classic	W 85–49	8–4	21 – Levy	11 – Lutje Schipholt	7 – Wilson	Massimino Court; West Palm Beach, FL
December 21, 2023*; 3:30 pm, FloHoops		vs. No. 10 Baylor; West Palm Beach Classic	L 50–73	8–5	16 – Blasigh	11 – Brito	5 – Wilson	Massimino Court (452); West Palm Beach, FL
AAC regular season
December 30, 2023; 7:00 pm, ESPN+		SMU	W 70–61	9–5 (1–0)	16 – Blasigh	11 – Brito	7 – Wilson	Yuengling Center (2,142); Tampa, FL
January 3, 2024; 7:00 pm, ESPNU		Charlotte	L 61–66 ^{OT}	9–6 (1–1)	24 – Levy	10 – Lutje Schipholt	6 – Levy	Yuengling Center (2,305); Tampa, FL
January 6, 2024; 3:00 pm, ESPN+		at Tulane	W 70–63	10–6 (2–1)	32 – Levy	12 – Lutje Schipholt	4 – 2 Tied	Devlin Fieldhouse (817); New Orleans, LA
January 10, 2024; 7:00 pm, ESPN+		Tulsa	W 68–52	11–6 (3–1)	35 – Blasigh	10 – Lutje Schipholt	7 – Wilson	Yuengling Center (2,633); Tampa, FL
January 14, 2024; 1:00 pm, ESPNU		at Rice	L 64–67	11–7 (3–2)	26 – Blasigh	8 – Levy	4 – Wilson	Tudor Fieldhouse (893); Houston, TX
January 16, 2024; 7:30 pm, ESPN+		at UTSA	L 42–65	11–8 (3–3)	12 – Levy	6 – 2 Tied	2 – 3 Tied	Convocation Center (758); San Antonio, TX
January 20, 2024; 7:00 pm, ESPN+		North Texas	L 61–65	11–9 (3–4)	27 – Levy	11 – Brito	5 – 2 Tied	Yuengling Center (2,516); Tampa, FL
January 28, 2024; 12:00 pm, ESPNU		East Carolina	W 54–40	12–9 (4–4)	21 – Levy	10 – Lutje Schipholt	4 – Levy	Yuengling Center (2,984); Tampa, FL
February 1, 2024; 8:00 pm, ESPN+		at Memphis	W 69–46	13–9 (5–4)	24 – Levy	7 – Lutje Schipholt	3 – 2 Tied	Elma Roane Fieldhouse (995); Memphis, TN
February 3, 2024; 5:00 pm, ESPN+		at UAB	W 72–69	14–9 (6–4)	21 – Blasigh	8 – Lutje Schipholt	7 – Wilson	Bartow Arena (508); Birmingham, AL
February 7, 2024; 7:00 pm, ESPN+		Rice	L 59–69	14–10 (6–5)	17 – Blasigh	14 – Lutje Schipholt	8 – Wilson	Yuengling Center (3,005); Tampa, FL
February 10, 2024; 3:00 pm, ESPN+		at Temple	L 55–59	14–11 (6–6)	26 – Levy	19 – Lutje Schipholt	6 – Wilson	Liacouras Center (1,596); Philadelphia, PA
February 13, 2024; 7:00 pm, ESPN+		Wichita State	W 79–57	15–11 (7–6)	28 – Levy	8 – Levy	7 – Wilson	Yuengling Center (3,063); Tampa, FL
February 17, 2024; 7:00 pm, ESPN+		Florida Atlantic	L 55–67	15–12 (7–7)	21 – Levy	11 – 2 Tied	7 – Wilson	Yuengling Center (3,724); Tampa, FL
February 21, 2024; 6:00 pm, ESPN+		at East Carolina	W 78–68	16–12 (8–7)	22 – Levy	10 – Lutje Schipholt	10 – Wilson	Williams Arena (1,106); Greenville, NC
February 25, 2024; 3:00 pm, ESPN+		at Tulsa	L 65–72	16–13 (8–8)	17 – Levy	11 – Gonzalez	3 – Wilson	Reynolds Center (1,393); Tulsa, OK
March 2, 2024; 7:00 pm, ESPN+		Tulane	W 53–51	17–13 (9–8)	21 – Levy	8 – Levy	3 – 2 Tied	Yuengling Center (3,923); Tampa, FL
March 5, 2024; 8:00 pm, ESPN+		at SMU	W 68–61 ^{OT}	18–13 (10–8)	15 – 2 Tied	10 – Lutje Schipholt	5 – Wilson	Moody Coliseum (1,065); University Park, TX
AAC Women's Tournament
March 10, 2024; 3:00 pm, ESPN+	(5)	vs. (13) Wichita State; Second Round	W 69–62	19–13	14 – Brito	11 – Mputu	5 – Wilson	Dickies Arena (1,506); Fort Worth, TX
March 11, 2024; 3:00 pm, ESPN+	(5)	vs. (4) UTSA; Quarterfinals	L 56–58	19–14	23 – Blasigh	13 – Lutje Schipholt	6 – Wilson	Dickies Arena; Fort Worth, TX
*Non-conference game. ^{#}Rankings from AP Poll. (#) Tournament seedings in parentheses. All times are in Eastern.
