= 2023–24 Tulane Green Wave women's basketball team =

American college basketball season

2023–24 Tulane Green Wave women's basketball
- Conference: American Athletic Conference
- Record: 12–20 (3–15 AAC)
- Head coach: Lisa Stockton (30th season)
- Associate head coach: Alan Frey
- Assistant coaches: Olivia Grayson; Janet Butler; Moon Ursin
- Home arena: Devlin Fieldhouse

2023–24 American Athletic Conference women's basketball standings
| | Conf. | | | | Overall |
| Team | W | | L | PCT | W | | L | PCT |
|---|---|---|---|---|---|---|---|---|
| Tulsa | 13 | – | 5 | .722 | 25 | – | 10 | .714 |
| North Texas | 13 | – | 5 | .722 | 23 | – | 9 | .719 |
| Temple | 13 | – | 5 | .722 | 20 | – | 12 | .625 |
| UTSA | 10 | – | 8 | .556 | 18 | – | 15 | .545 |
| South Florida | 10 | – | 8 | .556 | 19 | – | 14 | .576 |
| Charlotte | 9 | – | 9 | .500 | 16 | – | 15 | .516 |
| UAB | 9 | – | 9 | .500 | 18 | – | 14 | .563 |
| Memphis | 9 | – | 9 | .500 | 13 | – | 17 | .433 |
| East Carolina | 9 | – | 9 | .500 | 19 | – | 14 | .576 |
| Rice † | 9 | – | 9 | .500 | 19 | – | 15 | .559 |
| SMU | 8 | – | 10 | .444 | 14 | – | 16 | .467 |
| Florida Atlantic | 6 | – | 12 | .333 | 11 | – | 19 | .367 |
| Wichita State | 5 | – | 13 | .278 | 10 | – | 22 | .313 |
| Tulane | 3 | – | 15 | .167 | 12 | – | 20 | .375 |
† 2024 AAC tournament winner

The 2023–24 Tulane Green Wave women's basketball team represented Tulane University during the 2023–24 NCAA Division I women's basketball season. The Green Wave, led by 30th-year head coach Lisa Stockton, played their home games at Devlin Fieldhouse in New Orleans, Louisiana as members of the American Athletic Conference (AAC).

The Green Wave finished the season 12–20, 3–15 in AAC play, to finish in 14th (last) place. They upset SMU and Charlotte, before falling to Temple in the quarterfinals of the AAC tournament.

On March 19, 2024, head coach Lisa Stockton announced her retirement, having led the Green Wave for 30 seasons. On April 2, Stony Brook head coach and Tulane alum Ashley Langford announced that she would be stepping down from her position at Stony Brook, in order to take the same position at Tulane.

== Previous season ==
The Green Wave finished the 2022–23 season 18–14, 7–9 in AAC play, to finish in a tie for sixth place. As the #6 seed in the AAC tournament, they defeated #11 seed Cincinnati in the first round, before falling to #3 seed and eventual tournament champions East Carolina in the quarterfinals. They received an at-large bid into the WNIT, where they lost to Auburn in the first round.

== Roster ==
2023–24 Tulane Green Wave women's basketball team
Players
Coaches

| Pos. | # | Name | Height | Year | Previous school | Hometown |
|---|---|---|---|---|---|---|
| G | 0 | Kyren Whittington | 5 ft 9 in (1.75 m) | RS Jr | Louisiana–Monroe | Folsom, LA |
| G | 1 | Kaylah Rainey | 5 ft 6 in (1.68 m) | GS | Northwestern | Belleville, IL |
| G | 2 | Kierra Middleton | 5 ft 7 in (1.7 m) | Jr | Midlothian High School | Arlington, TX |
| G | 3 | Marta Galic | 6 ft 0 in (1.83 m) | GS | San Francisco | Zagreb, Croatia |
| G | 5 | Jaylee Womack | 5 ft 10 in (1.78 m) | RS Fr | Ponchatoula High School | Springfield, LA |
| G | 8 | Joy Madison-Key | 5 ft 8 in (1.73 m) | Fr | South Grand Prairie High School | Grand Prairie, TX |
| F | 12 | Hannah Pratt | 6 ft 1 in (1.85 m) | GS | Columbia | Boca Raton, FL |
| F | 21 | Irina Parau | 6 ft 1 in (1.85 m) | RS Sr | Nicolae Bălcescu | Cluj-Napoca, Romania |
| G/F | 22 | McKenzi Carter | 6 ft 1 in (1.85 m) | RS Jr | Fort Worth Country Day School | Fort Worth, TX |
| F | 23 | Amira Mabry | 6 ft 0 in (1.83 m) | So | Judson High School | Converse, TX |
| G | 24 | Chiara Grattini | 5 ft 9 in (1.75 m) | RS Jr | IIS Giordano Bruno | Turin, Italy |
| C | 33 | Lily Ba | 6 ft 3 in (1.91 m) | Fr | Blue Valley West High School | Overland Park, KS |

Head coach

- Lisa Stockton (Wake Forest)

Assistant coach(es)

- Alan Frey (New Orleans)
- Olivia Grayson (Tulane)
- Janet Butler (Louisiana College)
- Moon Ursin (Tulane)

Legend

- (C) Team captain
- (S) Suspended
- (I) Ineligible
- (W) Walk-on
- Injured
- Current redshirt

Roster
Last update: December 15, 2023

== Schedule and results ==
| Date time, TV | Rank^{#} | Opponent^{#} | Result | Record | High points | High rebounds | High assists | Site (attendance) city, state |
Exhibition
| October 30, 2023*; 6:00 p.m. | | Loyola (New Orleans) | W 72–38 | – | 20 – Whittington | 6 – 2 tied | 5 – Grattini | Devlin Fieldhouse (635); New Orleans, LA |
Non-conference regular season
| November 6, 2023*; 5:00 p.m., ESPN+ | | Stetson | W 68–57 | 1–0 | 16 – Whittington | 8 – Pratt | 5 – 2 tied | Devlin Fieldhouse (1,251); New Orleans, LA |
| November 8, 2023*; 6:00 p.m., ESPN+ | | Nicholls | L 66–69 | 1–1 | 17 – Pratt | 10 – Parau | 6 – Rainey | Devlin Fieldhouse (594); New Orleans, LA |
| November 14, 2023*; 6:00 p.m., ESPN+ | | Prairie View A&M | W 71–46 | 2–1 | 20 – Whittington | 9 – Mabry | 5 – Parau | Devlin Fieldhouse (588); New Orleans, LA |
| November 19, 2023*; 1:00 p.m., ESPN+ | | at Mercer | W 64–58 | 3–1 | 15 – 2 tied | 8 – 2 tied | 5 – Rainey | Hawkins Arena (607); Macon, GA |
| November 24, 2023*; 10:00 a.m., FloHoops | | vs. Virginia; Cayman Islands Classic | L 59–81 | 3–2 | 15 – Pratt | 9 – Mabry | 3 – Pratt | John Gray Gymnasium; George Town, Cayman Islands |
| November 25, 2023*; 10:00 a.m., FloHoops | | vs. No. 9 Virginia Tech; Cayman Islands Classic | L 70–76 | 3–3 | 26 – Whittington | 7 – Mabry | 3 – Rainey | John Gray Gymnasium (500); George Town, Cayman Islands |
| December 1, 2023*; 6:30 p.m., ESPN+ | | at Missouri State | L 60–70 | 3–4 | 19 – Galic | 7 – 2 tied | 5 – Rainey | Great Southern Bank Arena (1,922); Springfield, MO |
| December 6, 2023*; 6:00 p.m., ESPN+ | | New Orleans | W 90–63 | 4–4 | 22 – Whittington | 7 – Parau | 6 – Galic | Devlin Fieldhouse (1,026); New Orleans, LA |
| December 10, 2023*; 1:00 p.m., ESPN+ | | Howard | W 67–52 | 5–4 | 22 – Whittington | 8 – Whittington | 5 – Parau | Devlin Fieldhouse (1,243); New Orleans, LA |
| December 20, 2023*; 12:00 p.m., ESPN+ | | Little Rock; Tulane Holiday Tournament | W 66–57 | 6–4 | 24 – Galic | 5 – 3 tied | 6 – Rainey | Devlin Fieldhouse (721); New Orleans, LA |
| December 21, 2023*; 1:30 p.m., ESPN+ | | Maine; Tulane Holiday Tournament | W 64–61 | 7–4 | 19 – Whittington | 11 – Parau | 9 – Rainey | Devlin Fieldhouse (782); New Orleans, LA |
AAC regular season
| December 30, 2023; 2:00 p.m., ESPN+ | | at Wichita State | L 60–63 | 7–5 (0–1) | 17 – Whittington | 7 – 4 tied | 4 – Whittington | Charles Koch Arena (1,300); Wichita, KS |
| January 2, 2024; 6:30 p.m., ESPN+ | | at Tulsa | L 54–72 | 7–6 (0–2) | 12 – Galic | 11 – Parau | 5 – Madison-Key | Reynolds Center (1,031); Tulsa, OK |
| January 6, 2024; 2:00 p.m., ESPN+ | | South Florida | L 63–70 | 7–7 (0–3) | 23 – Galic | 7 – 2 tied | 6 – Parau | Devlin Fieldhouse (817); New Orleans, LA |
| January 13, 2024; 2:00 p.m., ESPN+ | | East Carolina | W 81–55 | 8–7 (1–3) | 26 – Pratt | 11 – Mabry | 7 – 2 tied | Devlin Fieldhouse (709); New Orleans, LA |
| January 17, 2024; 5:30 p.m., ESPN+ | | at Charlotte | L 64–66 | 8–8 (1–4) | 23 – Mabry | 7 – Mabry | 8 – Grattini | Dale F. Halton Arena (734); Charlotte, NC |
| January 20, 2024; 2:00 p.m., ESPN+ | | Rice | L 44–61 | 8–9 (1–5) | 14 – Mabry | 7 – Mabry | 5 – 2 tied | Devlin Fieldhouse (982); New Orleans, LA |
| January 24, 2024; 6:30 p.m., ESPN+ | | at North Texas | L 70–77 ^{OT} | 8–10 (1–6) | 21 – Galic | 7 – 2 tied | 6 – Rainey | The Super Pit (1,667); Denton, TX |
| January 28, 2024; 2:00 p.m., ESPN+ | | Temple | L 50–68 | 8–11 (1–7) | 14 – Whittington | 12 – Parau | 3 – 2 tied | Devlin Fieldhouse (861); New Orleans, LA |
| January 31, 2024; 6:00 p.m., ESPN+ | | Charlotte | W 70–68 | 9–11 (2–7) | 21 – Mabry | 7 – Pratt | 4 – 3 tied | Devlin Fieldhouse; New Orleans, LA |
| February 4, 2024; 2:00 p.m., ESPN+ | | at UTSA | W 75–64 | 10–11 (3–7) | 15 – Mabry | 5 – Pratt | 4 – 2 tied | Convocation Center (990); San Antonio, TX |
| February 7, 2024; 6:00 p.m., ESPN+ | | UAB | L 77–94 | 10–12 (3–8) | 14 – Pratt | 8 – Mabry | 10 – Madison-Key | Devlin Fieldhouse (855); New Orleans, LA |
| February 10, 2024; 2:00 p.m., ESPN+ | | at Memphis | L 79–80 ^{OT} | 10–13 (3–9) | 33 – Whittington | 9 – Mabry | 5 – Whittington | Elma Roane Fieldhouse (1,473); Memphis, TN |
| February 14, 2024; 6:00 p.m., ESPN+ | | SMU | L 53–63 | 10–14 (3–10) | 15 – Whittington | 7 – Parau | 5 – Rainey | Devlin Fieldhouse (762); New Orleans, LA |
| February 19, 2024; 6:00 p.m., ESPN+ | | at Temple | L 52–69 | 10–15 (3–11) | 18 – Mabry | 13 – Mabry | 5 – Rainey | Liacouras Center (1,033); Philadelphia, PA |
| February 24, 2024; 2:00 p.m., ESPN+ | | Memphis | L 44–54 | 10–16 (3–12) | 14 – Mabry | 7 – Whittington | 3 – Whittington | Devlin Fieldhouse (1,201); New Orleans, LA |
| February 28, 2024; 6:00 p.m., ESPN+ | | at Florida Atlantic | L 67–80 | 10–17 (3–13) | 28 – Whittington | 8 – Mabry | 6 – Parau | Eleanor R. Baldwin Arena (404); Boca Raton, FL |
| March 2, 2024; 6:00 p.m., ESPN+ | | at South Florida | L 51–53 | 10–18 (3–14) | 22 – Whittington | 7 – 2 tied | 5 – Grattini | Yuengling Center (3,923); Tampa, FL |
| March 5, 2024; 6:00 p.m., ESPN+ | | Tulsa | L 56–61 | 10–19 (3–15) | 16 – Parau | 14 – Parau | 7 – Rainey | Devlin Fieldhouse (1,008); New Orleans, LA |
AAC tournament
| March 9, 2024; 7:00 p.m., ESPN+ | (14) | vs. (11) SMU; First round | W 68–62 | 11–19 | 28 – Whittington | 6 – 2 tied | 5 – Rainey | Dickies Arena (1,518); Fort Worth, TX |
| March 10, 2024; 8:00 p.m., ESPN+ | (14) | vs. (6) Charlotte; Second round | W 65–52 | 12–19 | 20 – Mabry | 7 – 2 tied | 7 – Parau | Dickies Arena (1,483); Fort Worth, TX |
| March 11, 2024; 8:00 p.m., ESPN+ | (14) | vs. (3) Temple; Quarterfinals | L 72–76 ^{3OT} | 12–20 | 31 – Whittington | 12 – Mabry | 6 – Whittington | Dickies Arena (1,602); Fort Worth, TX |
*Non-conference game. ^{#}Rankings from AP poll. (#) Tournament seedings in parentheses. All times are in Central.
