= 2023–24 UTSA Roadrunners women's basketball team =

American college basketball season

2023–24 UTSA Roadrunners women's basketball

WNIT, second round
- Conference: American Athletic Conference
- Record: 18–15 (10–8 AAC)
- Head coach: Karen Aston (3rd season)
- Associate head coach: Jamie Carey
- Assistant coaches: Empress Davenport; Cameron Miles
- Home arena: Convocation Center

2023–24 American Athletic Conference women's basketball standings
	Conf.				Overall
Team	W		L	PCT	W		L	PCT
Tulsa	13	–	5	.722	25	–	10	.714
North Texas	13	–	5	.722	23	–	9	.719
Temple	13	–	5	.722	20	–	12	.625
UTSA	10	–	8	.556	18	–	15	.545
South Florida	10	–	8	.556	19	–	14	.576
Charlotte	9	–	9	.500	16	–	15	.516
UAB	9	–	9	.500	18	–	14	.563
Memphis	9	–	9	.500	13	–	17	.433
East Carolina	9	–	9	.500	19	–	14	.576
Rice †	9	–	9	.500	19	–	15	.559
SMU	8	–	10	.444	14	–	16	.467
Florida Atlantic	6	–	12	.333	11	–	19	.367
Wichita State	5	–	13	.278	10	–	22	.313
Tulane	3	–	15	.167	12	–	20	.375
† 2024 AAC tournament winner

The 2023–24 UTSA Roadrunners women's basketball team represented the University of Texas at San Antonio (UTSA) during the 2023–24 NCAA Division I women's basketball season. The Roadrunners, led by third-year head coach Karen Aston, played their home games at the Convocation Center in San Antonio, Texas as first-year members of the American Athletic Conference (AAC).

== Previous season ==
The Roadrunners finished the 2022–23 season 13–19, 9–11 in Conference USA (C-USA) play, to finish in sixth place. As the #6 seed in the C-USA tournament, they defeated #11 seed Florida Atlantic in the first round, upset #3 seed Rice in the quarterfinals, before falling to #2 seed Western Kentucky in the semifinals. This was the Roadrunners' final season as members of Conference USA, as they moved to the American Athletic Conference effective July 1, 2023.

== Roster ==
2023–24 UTSA Roadrunners women's basketball team
Players
Coaches

Pos.	#	Name	Height	Year	Previous school	Hometown
F	0	Elyssa Coleman	6 ft 3 in (1.91 m)	RS Jr	Texas	Houston, TX
G	1	Hailey Atwood	5 ft 8 in (1.73 m)	GS	Blinn College	Austin, TX
G	2	Alexis Parker	5 ft 9 in (1.75 m)	So	Brandeis High School	San Antonio, TX
G	3	Emma Lucio	5 ft 9 in (1.75 m)	Fr	Robert Vela High School	Edinburg, TX
G	4	Siena Guttadauro	5 ft 6 in (1.68 m)	So	Archbishop Mitty High School	San Jose, CA
G	5	Madison Cockrell	5 ft 4 in (1.63 m)	So	Bishop Lynch High School	Dallas, TX
G	11	Sidney Love	5 ft 8 in (1.73 m)	So	Steele High School	Cibolo, TX
G	12	Aysia Proctor	5 ft 8 in (1.73 m)	Fr	Samuel Clemens High School	Schertz, TX
G	13	Sarai Estupiñan	5 ft 5 in (1.65 m)	Jr	Tallahassee Community College	Cedar Park, TX
F	20	Maya Linton	5 ft 11 in (1.8 m)	So	Duncanville High School	Duncanville, TX
F	21	Cheyenne Rowe	6 ft 2 in (1.88 m)	So	James Madison	Ajax, ON
G	22	Kyra White	5 ft 9 in (1.75 m)	Sr	USC	Converse, TX
F	23	Kyleigh McGuire	5 ft 11 in (1.8 m)	Sr	Atascocita High School	Houston, TX
F	25	Idara Udo	6 ft 1 in (1.85 m)	Fr	Plano East High School	Plano, TX
C	30	Nissa Sam-Grant	6 ft 4 in (1.93 m)	Sr	Panola College	Toronto, ON
F	32	Jordyn Jenkins	6 ft 0 in (1.83 m)	Sr	USC	Kent, WA

Head coach

- Karen Aston (Little Rock)

Assistant coach(es)

- Jamie Carey (Texas)
- Empress Davenport (Texas)
- Cameron Miles (San Diego)

Legend

- (C) Team captain
- (S) Suspended
- (I) Ineligible
- (W) Walk-on
- Injured
- Current redshirt

Roster
Last update: December 14, 2023

== Schedule and results ==
Date time, TV	Rank^{#}	Opponent^{#}	Result	Record	High points	High rebounds	High assists	Site (attendance) city, state
Exhibition
November 1, 2023*; 7:00 p.m.		St. Mary's (TX)	W 67–46	–	–	–	–	Convocation Center (155); San Antonio, TX
Non-conference regular season
November 6, 2023*; 6:00 p.m.		at Arizona State	L 55–70	0–1	10 – 2 tied	9 – 2 tied	4 – White	Desert Financial Arena (821); Tempe, AZ
November 10, 2023*; 7:00 p.m., ESPN+		New Mexico State	W 58–55	1–1	19 – Proctor	11 – Udo	3 – 2 tied	Convocation Center (712); San Antonio, TX
November 15, 2023*; 7:00 p.m., ESPN+		at Texas A&M–Corpus Christi	W 66–59 ^{OT}	2–1	18 – White	7 – 2 tied	5 – 2 tied	Dugan Wellness Center (779); Corpus Christi, TX
November 18, 2023*; 2:00 p.m., ESPN+		at UT Arlington	W 70–66	3–1	26 – Love	10 – Linton	6 – White	College Park Center (832); Arlington, TX
November 20, 2023*; 6:00 p.m., ESPN+		at Texas Tech	L 58–63	3–2	18 – Love	8 – 2 tied	3 – White	United Supermarkets Arena (4,155); Lubbock, TX
November 25, 2023*; 4:00 p.m., ESPN+		at Sam Houston	W 63–56	4–2	17 – Coleman	8 – Proctor	3 – Proctor	Bernard Johnson Coliseum (235); Huntsville, TX
November 30, 2023*; 5:00 p.m., ESPN+		Texas State; Battle of I-35	L 57–65 ^{OT}	4–3	11 – 3 tied	9 – Coleman	5 – White	Convocation Center (1,535); San Antonio, TX
December 3, 2023*; 12:00 p.m., ESPN+		UTEP	W 90–66	5–3	23 – Coleman	8 – Coleman	7 – 2 tied	Convocation Center (926); San Antonio, TX
December 14, 2023*; 6:00 p.m., ESPN+		Houston	L 64–66	5–4	17 – White	8 – 2 tied	5 – White	Convocation Center (869); San Antonio, TX
December 17, 2023*; 1:00 p.m., P12N+		at Oregon	L 48–61	5–5	20 – Proctor	13 – Coleman	4 – White	Matthew Knight Arena (5,549); Eugene, OR
December 19, 2023*; 2:00 p.m., ESPN+		at Seattle	W 75–64	6–5	18 – Coleman	9 – Coleman	6 – Love	Redhawk Center (339); Seattle, WA
AAC regular season
December 30, 2023; 12:00 p.m., ESPN+		at Temple	L 58–71	6–6 (0–1)	16 – White	7 – Coleman	5 – Love	Liacouras Center (1,324); Philadelphia, PA
January 2, 2024; 5:00 p.m., ESPN+		at East Carolina	L 54–82	6–7 (0–2)	13 – Cockrell	6 – Sam-Grant	7 – White	Williams Arena (956); Greenville, NC
January 6, 2024; 2:00 p.m., ESPN+		Wichita State	W 74–60	7–7 (1–2)	32 – Coleman	19 – Coleman	8 – White	Convocation Center (722); San Antonio, TX
January 10, 2024; 6:00 p.m., ESPN+		at Florida Atlantic	W 73–60	8–7 (2–2)	17 – Proctor	10 – Coleman	5 – White	Eleanor R. Baldwin Arena (243); Boca Raton, FL
January 14, 2024; 2:00 p.m., ESPN+		Charlotte	W 81–80 ^{OT}	9–7 (3–2)	26 – Udo	13 – Proctor	9 – White	Convocation Center (671); San Antonio, TX
January 16, 2024; 6:30 p.m., ESPN+		South Florida	W 65–42	10–7 (4–2)	23 – White	8 – 2 tied	6 – White	Convocation Center (758); San Antonio, TX
January 21, 2024; 1:00 p.m., ESPN+		at UAB	L 53–54	10–8 (4–3)	11 – 3 tied	10 – White	6 – White	Bartow Arena (406); Birmingham, AL
January 27, 2024; 2:00 p.m., ESPN+		at SMU	L 58–75	10–9 (4–4)	11 – 3 tied	11 – White	7 – White	Moody Coliseum (1,396); University Park, TX
January 31, 2024; 6:30 p.m., ESPN+		North Texas	W 75–67 ^{OT}	11–9 (5–4)	14 – Udo	12 – Udo	6 – White	Convocation Center (924); San Antonio, TX
February 4, 2024; 2:00 p.m., ESPN+		Tulane	L 64–75	11–10 (5–5)	21 – Coleman	12 – Coleman	6 – White	Convocation Center (990); San Antonio, TX
February 11, 2024; 1:00 p.m., ESPN+		UAB	W 76–58	12–10 (6–5)	14 – Proctor	7 – 2 tied	6 – Love	Convocation Center (738); San Antonio, TX
February 14, 2024; 6:30 p.m., ESPN+		at Tulsa	L 70–74	12–11 (6–6)	16 – Love	7 – 2 tied	2 – 2 tied	Reynolds Center (1,177); Tulsa, OK
February 18, 2024; 2:00 p.m., ESPN+		at North Texas	W 66–63	13–11 (7–6)	29 – Jenkins	9 – Coleman	4 – 2 tied	The Super Pit (1,826); Denton, TX
February 22, 2024; 6:30 p.m., ESPN+		Temple	L 48–56	13–12 (7–7)	15 – Jenkins	10 – Jenkins	4 – 2 tied	Convocation Center (881); San Antonio, TX
February 25, 2024; 1:00 p.m., ESPN+		Florida Atlantic	W 76–60	14–12 (8–7)	23 – White	13 – Udo	6 – Love	Convocation Center (751); San Antonio, TX
February 28, 2024; 7:00 p.m., ESPN+		at Memphis	L 53–60	14–13 (8–8)	11 – Jenkins	11 – Jenkins	4 – Love	Elma Roane Fieldhouse (973); Memphis, TN
March 2, 2024; 2:00 p.m., ESPN+		at Wichita State	W 68–61	15–13 (9–8)	17 – Jenkins	11 – Coleman	5 – White	Charles Koch Arena (1,223); Wichita, KS
March 5, 2024; 6:30 p.m., ESPN+		Rice	W 60–52	16–13 (10–8)	14 – 2 tied	11 – Udo	2 – 2 tied	Convocation Center (1,252); San Antonio, TX
AAC women's tournament
March 11, 2024; 2:00 p.m., ESPN+	(4)	vs. (5) South Florida; Quarterfinals	W 58–56	17–13	20 – Jenkins	6 – Jenkins	7 – White	Dickies Arena (1551); Fort Worth, TX
March 12, 2024; 6:00 p.m., ESPN+	(4)	vs. (9) East Carolina; Semifinals	L 54–55	17–14	14 – Jenkins	9 – Proctor	8 – White	Dickies Arena (1,520); Fort Worth, TX
WNIT
March 21, 2024*; 6:30 p.m., ESPN+		Northern Colorado; First round	W 80–62	18–14	27 – Jenkins	9 – Jenkins	9 – White	Convocation Center (873); San Antonio, TX
March 21, 2024*; 2:00 p.m., ESPN+		at Wyoming; Second round	L 64–80	18–15	28 – Jenkins	6 – Love	3 – Proctor	Arena-Auditorium (2,061); Laramie, WY
*Non-conference game. ^{#}Rankings from AP poll. (#) Tournament seedings in parentheses. All times are in Central.
