= 2023–24 Memphis Tigers women's basketball team =

American college basketball season

2023–24 Memphis Tigers women's basketball
- Conference: American Athletic Conference
- Record: 13–17 (9–9 AAC)
- Head coach: Alex Simmons (1st season)
- Assistant coaches: Harlyn Wyatt; Josh Cooperwood; Whitney Bays; Nadiria Evans; Keke McKinney
- Home arena: Elma Roane Fieldhouse

2023–24 American Athletic Conference women's basketball standings
| | Conf. | | | | Overall |
| Team | W | | L | PCT | W | | L | PCT |
|---|---|---|---|---|---|---|---|---|
| Tulsa | 13 | – | 5 | .722 | 25 | – | 10 | .714 |
| North Texas | 13 | – | 5 | .722 | 23 | – | 9 | .719 |
| Temple | 13 | – | 5 | .722 | 20 | – | 12 | .625 |
| UTSA | 10 | – | 8 | .556 | 18 | – | 15 | .545 |
| South Florida | 10 | – | 8 | .556 | 19 | – | 14 | .576 |
| Charlotte | 9 | – | 9 | .500 | 16 | – | 15 | .516 |
| UAB | 9 | – | 9 | .500 | 18 | – | 14 | .563 |
| Memphis | 9 | – | 9 | .500 | 13 | – | 17 | .433 |
| East Carolina | 9 | – | 9 | .500 | 19 | – | 14 | .576 |
| Rice † | 9 | – | 9 | .500 | 19 | – | 15 | .559 |
| SMU | 8 | – | 10 | .444 | 14 | – | 16 | .467 |
| Florida Atlantic | 6 | – | 12 | .333 | 11 | – | 19 | .367 |
| Wichita State | 5 | – | 13 | .278 | 10 | – | 22 | .313 |
| Tulane | 3 | – | 15 | .167 | 12 | – | 20 | .375 |
† 2024 AAC tournament winner

The 2023–24 Memphis Tigers women's basketball team represented the University of Memphis during the 2023–24 NCAA Division I women's basketball season. The Tigers, led by first-year head coach Alex Simmons, played their home games at the Elma Roane Fieldhouse in Memphis, Tennessee as members of the American Athletic Conference.

== Previous season ==
The Tigers finished the 2022–23 season 22–11, 11–4 in AAC play to finish in second place. As the #2 seed in the AAC tournament, they defeated #10 seed UCF in the quarterfinals, before falling to #3 seed East Carolina in the semifinals. They received an automatic bid into the WNIT, where they would defeat Jackson State in the first round and Ball State in the second round, before falling to Bowling Green in the Super 16.

On March 24, 2023, head coach Katrina Merriweather announced her resignation after two years at the helm, in order to take the head coaching job at her alma mater, Cincinnati. On April 6, Gardner–Webb head coach Alex Simmons was announced as Merriweather's successor.

== Roster ==
2023–24 Memphis Tigers women's basketball team
Players
Coaches

| Pos. | # | Name | Height | Year | Previous school | Hometown |
|---|---|---|---|---|---|---|
| G | 0 | Destyne Jackson | 5 ft 7 in (1.7 m) | Sr | Wright State | Lexington, Kentucky |
| G | 1 | Ki'Ari Cain | 5 ft 6 in (1.68 m) | Sr | Gardner–Webb | Sumter, South Carolina |
| G | 2 | Madison Griggs | 5 ft 9 in (1.75 m) | Sr | Houston High School | Memphis, Tennessee |
| F | 3 | Shelbee Brown | 5 ft 11 in (1.8 m) | Sr | Northwest Florida State College | Memphis, Tennessee |
| G | 5 | Ally Hollifield | 5 ft 7 in (1.7 m) | Fr | Shelby High School | Shelby, North Carolina |
| F | 7 | Hannah Riddick | 6 ft 1 in (1.85 m) | Jr | Cairine Wilson Secondary School | Calgary, Alberta |
| G | 11 | Tanyuel Welch | 5 ft 10 in (1.78 m) | So | North Central High School | Anderson, Indiana |
| F | 12 | Jana Sallman | 6 ft 3 in (1.91 m) | Fr | Western Reserve Academy | Cairo, Egypt |
| G | 20 | Nikole Thomas | 5 ft 7 in (1.7 m) | Fr | Kamiakin High School | Pasco, Washington |
| F | 21 | Latazia Williamson | 6 ft 1 in (1.85 m) | Fr | Hillsboro High School | Nashville, Tennessee |
| F | 22 | Layken Cox | 6 ft 1 in (1.85 m) | Jr | Gardner–Webb | Sumter, South Carolina |
| G | 23 | Raven Sims | 5 ft 9 in (1.75 m) | Fr | Bartlett High School | Memphis, Tennessee |
| G | 24 | Kai Carter | 6 ft 0 in (1.83 m) | Sr | Rutgers | Atlanta, Georgia |
| F | 30 | Alasia Smith | 5 ft 10 in (1.78 m) | Sr | Gardner–Webb | Johnson City, Tennessee |
| F | 35 | Aliyah Green | 6 ft 1 in (1.85 m) | Jr | Raymore–Peculiar High School | Peculiar, Missouri |

Head coach

- Alex Simmons (Tennessee)

Assistant coach(es)

- Harlyn Wyatt (Tulane)
- Josh Cooperwood (Tennessee State)
- Whitney Bays (Purdue)
- Nadiria Evans (UNC Asheville)
- Keke McKinney (Charlotte)

Legend

- (C) Team captain
- (S) Suspended
- (I) Ineligible
- (W) Walk-on
- Injured
- Current redshirt

Roster
Last update: December 17, 2023

== Schedule and results ==
| Date time, TV | Rank^{#} | Opponent^{#} | Result | Record | High points | High rebounds | High assists | Site (attendance) city, state |
Non-conference regular season
| November 6, 2023*; 5:00 pm, ESPN+ | | at Middle Tennessee | L 47–67 | 0–1 | 12 – Griggs | 9 – Smith | 2 – 2 Tied | Murphy Center (3,505); Murfreesboro, TN |
| November 9, 2023*; 7:00 pm, ESPN+ | | Alabama State | W 95–51 | 1–1 | 18 – Griggs | 6 – 2 Tied | 3 – Carter | Elma Roane Fieldhouse (1,444); Memphis, TN |
| November 13, 2023*; 5:30 pm, SECN+ | | at No. 15 Tennessee | L 74–84 ^{OT} | 1–2 | 18 – Carter | 5 – 3 Tied | 4 – Brown | Thompson–Boling Arena (7,729); Knoxville, TN |
| November 18, 2023*; 1:30 pm, FloHoops | | vs. Arizona; Battle 4 Atlantis quarterfinals | L 67–90 | 1–3 | 22 – 2 Tied | 11 – Smith | 3 – Cain | Imperial Arena (247); Nassau, Bahamas |
| November 19, 2023*; 4:00 pm, FloHoops | | vs. Howard; Battle 4 Atlantis consolation 2nd round | W 52–43 | 2–3 | 20 – Griggs | 9 – Brown | 4 – Carter | Imperial Arena (248); Nassau, Bahamas |
| November 20, 2023*; 4:00 pm, FloHoops | | vs. Middle Tennessee; Battle 4 Atlantis 5th place game | L 57–64 | 2–4 | 16 – Carter | 10 – Sallman | 5 – Cain | Imperial Arena (113); Nassau, Bahamas |
| November 29, 2023*; 7:00 pm, FloHoops | | at No. 23 Marquette | L 59–88 | 2–5 | 18 – Carter | 6 – Riddick | 2 – 2 Tied | Al McGuire Center (1,226); Milwaukee, WI |
| December 2, 2023*; 2:00 pm, ESPN+ | | Troy | W 100–88 | 3–5 | 22 – Griggs | 14 – Smith | 5 – Smith | Elma Roane Fieldhouse (1,084); Memphis, TN |
| December 6, 2023*; 6:00 pm, ESPN+ | | at Columbia | L 66–76 | 3–6 | 25 – Griggs | 11 – Smith | 3 – 2 Tied | Levien Gymnasium (907); New York, NY |
| December 10, 2023*; 2:00 pm, ESPN+ | | Southern Miss | W 69–67 | 4–6 | 14 – 2 Tied | 9 – Smith | 7 – Smith | Elma Roane Fieldhouse (1,077); Memphis, TN |
| December 17, 2023*; 2:00 pm, ESPN+ | | Mississippi State | L 63–81 | 4–7 | 24 – Griggs | 15 – Smith | 3 – 4 Tied | Elma Roane Fieldhouse (1,636); Memphis, TN |
AAC regular season
| December 30, 2023; 2:00 pm, ESPN+ | | Tulsa | L 62–71 | 4–8 (0–1) | 19 – Griggs | 13 – Smith | 3 – Griggs | Elma Roane Fieldhouse (739); Memphis, TN |
| January 3, 2024; 6:00 pm, ESPN+ | | at UAB | L 63–65 | 4–9 (0–2) | 22 – Griggs | 20 – Smith | 3 – Cain | Bartow Arena (489); Birmingham, AL |
| January 6, 2024; 2:00 pm, ESPN+ | | East Carolina | L 63–64 | 4–10 (0–3) | 22 – Riddick | 8 – Green | 3 – Green | Elma Roane Fieldhouse (1,315); Memphis, TN |
| January 11, 2024; 7:00 pm, ESPN+ | | SMU | L 86–91 ^{OT} | 4–11 (0–4) | 22 – Riddick | 9 – Smith | 5 – Griggs | Elma Roane Fieldhouse (854); Memphis, TN |
| January 14, 2024; 12:00 pm, ESPN+ | | at Temple | W 59–57 | 5–11 (1–4) | 18 – Smith | 10 – Smith | 3 – Smith | Liacouras Center (1,621); Philadelphia, PA |
| January 17, 2024; 6:00 pm, ESPN+ | | at Wichita State | L 66–71 | 5–12 (1–5) | 19 – Riddick | 9 – Brown | 3 – Griggs | Charles Koch Arena (1,133); Wichita, KS |
| January 20, 2024; 2:00 pm, ESPN+ | | Florida Atlantic | W 76–56 | 6–12 (2–5) | 19 – Carter | 12 – Smith | 7 – Cain | Elma Roane Fieldhouse (959); Memphis, TN |
| January 27, 2024; 2:00 pm, ESPN+ | | at Rice | W 73–66 | 7–12 (3–5) | 15 – Smith | 13 – Smith | 4 – Carter | Tudor Fieldhouse (841); Houston, TX |
| February 1, 2024; 7:00 pm, ESPN+ | | South Florida | L 46–69 | 7–13 (3–6) | 13 – Griggs | 5 – Smith | 3 – Cain | Elma Roane Fieldhouse (995); Memphis, TN |
| February 3, 2024; 2:00 pm, ESPN+ | | at SMU | L 73–81 | 7–14 (3–7) | 25 – Griggs | 8 – Riddick | 4 – Smith | Moody Coliseum (1,456); University Park, TX |
| February 10, 2024; 2:00 pm, ESPN+ | | Tulane | W 80–79 ^{OT} | 8–14 (4–7) | 20 – Griggs | 11 – Smith | 5 – Jackson | Elma Roane Fieldhouse (1,473); Memphis, TN |
| February 14, 2024; 5:30 pm, ESPN+ | | at Charlotte | L 56–65 | 8–15 (4–8) | 21 – Griggs | 9 – Smith | 3 – Griggs | Dale F. Halton Arena (723); Charlotte, NC |
| February 17, 2024; 1:00 pm, ESPN+ | | at East Carolina | W 72–70 | 9–15 (5–8) | 19 – Brown | 10 – Brown | 5 – Griggs | Williams Arena (1,287); Greenville, NC |
| February 20, 2024; 7:00 pm, ESPN+ | | Rice | W 79–74 ^{OT} | 10–15 (6–8) | 18 – Smith | 14 – Smith | 7 – Griggs | Elma Roane Fieldhouse (881); Memphis, TN |
| February 24, 2024; 2:00 pm, ESPN+ | | at Tulane | W 54–44 | 11–15 (7–8) | 15 – Griggs | 6 – 2 Tied | 4 – Cain | Devlin Fieldhouse (1,201); New Orleans, LA |
| February 28, 2024; 7:00 pm, ESPN+ | | UTSA | W 60–53 | 12–15 (8–8) | 13 – Griggs | 17 – Smith | 2 – Jackson | Elma Roane Fieldhouse (973); Memphis, TN |
| March 2, 2024; 2:00 pm, ESPN+ | | UAB | W 82–61 | 13–15 (9–8) | 21 – Griggs | 11 – Smith | 6 – Cain | Elma Roane Fieldhouse (1,131); Memphis, TN |
| March 5, 2024; 6:30 pm, ESPN+ | | at North Texas | L 66–78 | 13–16 (9–9) | 24 – Griggs | 6 – Smith | 5 – Cain | The Super Pit (2,528); Denton, TX |
AAC tournament
| March 10, 2024; 12:00 pm, ESPN+ | (8) | vs. (9) East Carolina; Second Round | L 63–65 | 13–17 | 16 – Griggs | 13 – Smith | 3 – 3 Tied | Dickies Arena (1,506); Fort Worth, TX |
*Non-conference game. ^{#}Rankings from AP Poll. (#) Tournament seedings in parentheses. All times are in Central.
