= 2015–16 South Florida Bulls women's basketball team =

Intercollegiate basketball season

2015–16 South Florida Bulls women's basketball

NCAA Women's Tournament, second round
- Conference: American Athletic Conference

Ranking
- Coaches: No. 22
- AP: No. 21
- Record: 24–10 (14–4 The American)
- Head coach: Jose Fernandez (16th season)
- Associate head coach: Jeff Osterman
- Assistant coaches: Michele Woods-Baxter; Desma Thomas Bateast
- Home arena: USF Sun Dome

2015–16 American Athletic Conference women's basketball standings
	Conf.				Overall
Team	W		L	PCT	W		L	PCT
No. 1 UConn †	18	–	0	1.000	38	–	0	1.000
No. 21 South Florida	14	–	4	.778	24	–	10	.706
Temple	13	–	5	.722	23	–	12	.657
Memphis	12	–	6	.667	18	–	13	.581
Tulane	11	–	7	.611	23	–	12	.657
Tulsa	8	–	10	.444	12	–	19	.387
SMU	7	–	11	.389	13	–	18	.419
East Carolina	6	–	12	.333	13	–	19	.406
Cincinnati	4	–	14	.222	8	–	22	.267
UCF	4	–	14	.222	7	–	23	.233
Houston	2	–	16	.111	6	–	24	.200
† American Tournament winner As of April 5, 2016; Rankings from AP poll

The 2015–16 South Florida Bulls women's basketball team represented the University of South Florida in the 2015–16 NCAA Division I basketball season. The Bulls, coached by Jose Fernandez in his sixteenth season, played their home games at the USF Sun Dome in Tampa, Florida. This was USF's third season as a member of the American Athletic Conference, known as The American or AAC. They finished the season 24–10, 14–4 in AAC play to finish in second place. They advanced to the championship game of the American Athletic Conference women's tournament for the second year in a row, where they lost to Connecticut again. They received an at-large bid to the NCAA women's tournament, where they defeated Colorado State in the first round before losing to UCLA in the second round.

== Media ==
All Bulls games aired on Bullscast Radio or CBS 1010 AM. Conference home games rotated between ESPN3, AAC Digital, and Bullscast. Road games were typically streamed on the opponent's website, though some conference road games also appeared on ESPN3 or AAC Digital.

== Roster ==
2015–16 South Florida Bulls women's basketball team
Players
Coaches

Pos.	#	Name	Height	Year	Previous school	Hometown
G	2	Micah Kroll	5 ft 8 in (1.73 m)	Sr	Tampa Catholic	Tampa, FL
G	4	Neena Pacholke	5 ft 7 in (1.7 m)	Jr	Freedom	Tampa, FL
G	5	Tremaine McCullough	5 ft 8 in (1.73 m)	Jr	Edgewater	Orlando, FL
G	10	Courtney Williams	5 ft 8 in (1.73 m)	Sr	Charlton County	Folkston, GA
G/F	11	Ariadna Pujol	6 ft 1 in (1.85 m)	Jr	GEM	Mataró, Spain
F	12	Maria Jesperson	6 ft 0 in (1.83 m)	So	None	Hojbjerg, Denmark
G	13	Laura Marcos Canedo	5 ft 8 in (1.73 m)	Jr	Colegio Champagnat	Salamanca, Spain
F	14	Paige Cashin	6 ft 4 in (1.93 m)	Jr	Newark	Newark, OH
G	20	Laura Ferreira	5 ft 11 in (1.8 m)	So	None	Lisbon, Portugal
G	22	Laia Flores	5 ft 7 in (1.7 m)	So	Institut Municipal Biada	Mataró, Spain
G	23	Shalethia Stringfield	5 ft 6 in (1.68 m)	RS Sr	Potters House Christian Academy	Jacksonville, FL
F	24	Alisia Jenkins	6 ft 1 in (1.85 m)	Sr	Statesboro	Statesboro, GA
C	32	Nancy Warioba	6 ft 3 in (1.91 m)	Jr	Tigoi Girls HS; Blinn College	Kisumu, Kenya
F	33	Kitija Laksa	6 ft 0 in (1.83 m)	Fr	Rigas Francu Licejs	Riga, Latvia
C	45	Katelyn Weber	6 ft 5 in (1.96 m)	Jr	Hall	Little Rock, AR

Head coach

- Jose Fernandez (Miami-Dade Kendall)

Assistant coach(es)

- Jeff Osterman (Siena)
- Michele Woods-Baxter (St. John Fisher College)
- Desma Thomas Bateast (Miami (FL))

Legend

- (C) Team captain
- (S) Suspended
- (I) Ineligible
- (W) Walk-on
- Injured
- Current redshirt

Roster

== Schedule ==
Date time, TV	Rank^{#}	Opponent^{#}	Result	Record	Site (attendance) city, state
Regular season
11/13/2015*; 6:00 pm	No. 20	Jacksonville; Preseason WNIT First Round	W 74–52	1–0	USF Sun Dome; Tampa, FL
11/15/2015*; 4:00 pm	No. 20	Drexel; Preseason WNIT Second Round	W 73–58	2–0	USF Sun Dome (1,790); Tampa, FL
11/19/2015*; 8:00 pm	No. 19	at No. 5 Baylor; Preseason WNIT semifinals	L 63–66	2–1	Ferrell Center (5,717); Waco, TX
11/25/2015*; 7:00 pm	No. 18	Butler	W 87–77	3–1	USF Sun Dome (1,772); Tampa, FL
11/29/2015*; 2:00 pm, FS2	No. 18	at St. John's	L 70–74	3–2	Carnesecca Arena (535); Queens, NY
12/03/2015*; 7:00 pm	No. 24	Harvard	W 86–59	4–2	USF Sun Dome (1,880); Tampa, FL
12/06/2015*; 3:00 pm, CBSSN	No. 24	Penn State	W 101–79	5–2	USF Sun Dome (1,908); Tampa, FL
12/13/2015*; 12:00 pm	No. 21	Chattanooga	W 61–33	6–2	USF Sun Dome (1,779); Tampa, FL
12/15/2015*; 9:00 pm	No. 20	at Northern Colorado	Cancelled		Bank of Colorado Arena; Greeley, CO
12/20/2015*; 2:00 pm	No. 20	Oklahoma State	W 68–46	7–2	USF Sun Dome (1,912); Tampa, FL
12/30/2015*; 4:30 pm, SECN	No. 20	vs. No. 8 Mississippi State; SEC/AAC Challenge	L 58–68	7–3	Jacksonville Veterans Memorial Arena; Jacksonville, FL
01/02/2016; 1:00 pm, CBSSN	No. 20	at East Carolina	W 61–59	8–3 (1–0)	Williams Arena (1,454); Greenville, NC
01/05/2016; 7:00 pm	No. 22	UCF; War on I-4	W 108–63	9–3 (2–0)	USF Sun Dome (1,856); Tampa, FL
01/07/2016; 7:00 pm, ADN	No. 22	SMU	W 83–56	10–3 (3–0)	USF Sun Dome (1,756); Tampa, FL
01/10/2016; 5:00 pm, ESPN	No. 22	No. 1 Connecticut	L 59–75	10–4 (3–1)	USF Sun Dome (6,634); Tampa, FL
01/13/2016; 8:00 pm, ESPN3	No. 19	at Tulane	W 71–67	11–4 (4–1)	Devlin Fieldhouse (1,646); New Orleans, LA
01/17/2016; 2:00 pm, ESPNU	No. 19	East Carolina	W 75–54	12–4 (5–1)	USF Sun Dome (2,101); Tampa, FL
01/20/2016; 8:00 pm, ADN	No. 15	at Memphis	L 87–88 ^{OT}	12–5 (5–2)	Elma Roane Fieldhouse (684); Memphis, TN
01/24/2016; 2:00 pm, ESPNU	No. 15	at UCF; War on I-4	W 88–49	13–5 (6–2)	CFE Arena (958); Orlando, FL
01/27/2016; 7:00 pm	No. 20	Houston	W 73–49	14–5 (7–2)	USF Sun Dome (1,885); Tampa, FL
01/31/2016; 2:00 pm, ESPNU	No. 20	at SMU	W 66–48	15–5 (8–2)	Moody Coliseum (982); Dallas, TX
02/03/2016; 7:00 pm	No. 19	Cincinnati	W 82–49	16–5 (9–2)	USF Sun Dome (2,007); Tampa, FL
02/06/2016; 2:00 pm, ESPN3	No. 19	at Temple	L 66–68	16–6 (9–3)	Liacouras Center (1,320); Philadelphia, PA
02/09/2016; 7:00 pm, ADN	No. 22	Tulane	W 77–65	17–6 (10–3)	USF Sun Dome (2,011); Tampa, FL
02/12/2016; 7:00 pm, ADN	No. 22	at Cincinnati	W 78–51	18–6 (11–3)	Fifth Third Arena (323); Cincinnati, OH
02/15/2016*; 9:00 pm, ESPN2	No. 19	at No. 11 Louisville	L 50–67	18–7	KFC Yum! Center (7,941); Louisville, KY
02/21/2016; 12:00 pm, ESPNU	No. 19	Memphis	W 97–82	19–7 (12–3)	USF Sun Dome (2,206); Tampa, FL
02/24/2016; 8:00 pm, ADN	No. 21	at Tulsa	W 72–66	20–7 (13–3)	Reynolds Center (337); Tulsa, OK
02/27/2016; 2:00 pm, ESPN3	No. 21	Temple	W 76–62	21–7 (14–3)	USF Sun Dome (2,446); Tampa, FL
02/29/2016; 7:00 pm, ESPN2	No. 20	at No. 1 Connecticut	L 59–79	21–8 (14–4)	Gampel Pavilion (9,030); Storrs, CT
American Athletic Conference Women's Tournament
03/05/2016; 6:00 pm, ESPN3	No. 20	vs. SMU; Quarterfinals	W 73–60	22–8	Mohegan Sun Arena; Uncasville, CT
03/06/2016; 7:30 pm, ESPNU	No. 20	vs. Temple; Semifinals	W 64–46	23–8	Mohegan Sun Arena (6,821); Uncasville, CT
03/06/2016; 7:00 pm, ESPN2	No. 21	vs. No. 1 Connecticut; Championship Game	L 51–77	23–9	Mohegan Sun Arena (7,073); Uncasville, CT
NCAA Women's Tournament
03/19/2016*; 9:00 pm, ESPN2	(6 BR) No. 21	vs. (11 BR) No. 22 Colorado State; First Round	W 48–45	24–9	Pauley Pavilion (2,552); Los Angeles, CA
03/21/2016*; 9:00 pm, ESPN2	(6 BR) No. 21	at (3 BR) No. 10 UCLA; Second Round	L 67–72	24–10	Pauley Pavilion (1,656); Los Angeles, CA
*Non-conference game. ^{#}Rankings from AP Poll. (#) Tournament seedings in parentheses. BR=Bridgeport region. All times are in EST.

== Rankings ==
Regular season polls
Poll	Pre- season	Week 2	Week 3	Week 4	Week 5	Week 6	Week 7	Week 8	Week 9	Week 10	Week 11	Week 12	Week 13	Week 14	Week 15	Week 16	Week 17	Week 18	Week 19	Final
AP	20	19	18	24т	21	20	20	20	22	19	15	20	19	22	19	21	20	21	21	N/A
Coaches	19	17	17	23	20	19	17	17	18	16	15	18	17	20	20	20	20	20	20	22

Legend
	Increase in ranking
	Decrease in ranking
	Not ranked previous week
(RV)	Received votes

== See also ==
- 2015–16 South Florida Bulls men's basketball team
