= 2015–16 East Carolina Pirates women's basketball team =

Intercollegiate basketball season

2015–16 East Carolina Pirates women's basketball
- Conference: American Athletic Conference
- Record: 13–19 (6–12 The American)
- Head coach: Heather Macy (6th season)
- Assistant coaches: John Marcum; Dalila Eshe; Crayton Jones
- Home arena: Williams Arena

2015–16 American Athletic Conference women's basketball standings
	Conf.				Overall
Team	W		L	PCT	W		L	PCT
No. 1 UConn †	18	–	0	1.000	38	–	0	1.000
No. 21 South Florida	14	–	4	.778	24	–	10	.706
Temple	13	–	5	.722	23	–	12	.657
Memphis	12	–	6	.667	18	–	13	.581
Tulane	11	–	7	.611	23	–	12	.657
Tulsa	8	–	10	.444	12	–	19	.387
SMU	7	–	11	.389	13	–	18	.419
East Carolina	6	–	12	.333	13	–	19	.406
Cincinnati	4	–	14	.222	8	–	22	.267
UCF	4	–	14	.222	7	–	23	.233
Houston	2	–	16	.111	6	–	24	.200
† American Tournament winner As of April 5, 2016; Rankings from AP poll

The 2015–16 East Carolina Pirates women's basketball team represented East Carolina University during the 2015–16 NCAA Division I women's basketball season. The Pirates, led by sixth-year head coach Heather Macy, played their home games at Williams Arena at Minges Coliseum and were second-year members of the American Athletic Conference. They finished the season 13–19, 6–12 AAC play to finish in eighth place. They advanced to the quarterfinals of the American Athletic women's tournament, where they lost to Connecticut.

== Media ==
All Pirates home games will have a video stream on Pirates All Access, ESPN3, or AAC Digital. Road games will typically be streamed on the opponent's website, though conference road games could also appear on ESPN3 or AAC Digital. Audio broadcasts for most road games can also be found on the opponent's website.

== Roster ==
2015–16 East Carolina Pirates women's basketball team
Players
Coaches

Pos.	#	Name	Height	Year	Previous school	Hometown
G	1	Alexandra Frazier	5 ft 9 in (1.75 m)	Fr	Central Gwinnett	Lawrenceville, GA
G	2	Khadidja Toure	5 ft 9 in (1.75 m)	RS Jr	Kamiakan; Oregon State	Kennewick, WA
G/F	3	Manesha Womble	5 ft 11 in (1.8 m)	Jr	Carver; Odessa College	Atlanta, GA
G	4	DeVaughn Gray	5 ft 11 in (1.8 m)	Jr	Booker T. Washington	Tulsa, OK
F	5	Chelsie Keys	6 ft 0 in (1.83 m)	Sr	Muskogee; Coffeyville	Muskogee, OK
G	11	Khadijha Ellison	5 ft 7 in (1.7 m)	Jr	Burke; Chipola College	Roxbury, MS
G/F	13	Fanni Csutoras	5 ft 11 in (1.8 m)	Jr	PTE Deak Ferenc Gyakorlo; Iowa Western CC	Bogád, Hungary
C	15	Derreyal Youngblood	6 ft 4 in (1.93 m)	RS Jr	John Curtos; LSU	Harvey, LA
G/F	20	Bre McDonald (I) (redshirt)	6 ft 0 in (1.83 m)	Jr	Chamblee; West Virginia	Lithonia, GA
G	22	Jasmine Phillips	5 ft 10 in (1.78 m)	Sr	Hartsville; Tennessee	Hartsville, SC
G/F	23	Jada Payne	6 ft 3 in (1.91 m)	RS Jr	Hickory; La Salle	Hickory, NC
F	24	I'Tiana Taylor	6 ft 1 in (1.85 m)	Sr	Pflugerville; Weatherford	Pflugerville, TX
C	25	Zippy Khasoa	6 ft 5 in (1.96 m)	Jr	Laiser Hill Academy; Weatherford	Nairobi, Kenya
G/F	40	Gabrielle Holston	6 ft 0 in (1.83 m)	RS So	Center Point; Georgia Tech	Margaret, AL
F	55	Marina Laramie	6 ft 3 in (1.91 m)	RS Jr	Ft. Zumwalt West; Indiana State	St. Louis, MO

Head coach

- Heather Macy (Greensboro)

Assistant coach(es)

- John Marcum (Oklahoma Baptist)
- Dalila Eshe (Florida)
- Crayton Jones (Francis Marion)

Legend

- (C) Team captain
- (S) Suspended
- (I) Ineligible
- (W) Walk-on
- Injured
- Current redshirt

Roster

== Schedule and results ==
Date time, TV	Rank^{#}	Opponent^{#}	Result	Record	Site (attendance) city, state
Non-conference regular season
11/13/2015*; 3:30 pm		vs. Texas–Rio Grande Valley; Islanders Classic	W 70–59	1–0	American Bank Center (76); Corpus Christi, TX
11/14/2015*; 8:00 pm		at Texas A&M–Corpus Christi; Islanders Classic	W 82–46	2–0	American Bank Center (513); Corpus Christi, TX
11/17/2015*; 7:00 pm		Alcorn State	W 87–58	3–0	Williams Arena (1,022); Greenville, NC
11/20/2015*; 11:30 am		Presbyterian	W 84–58	4–0	Williams Arena (5,408); Greenville, NC
11/22/2015*; 2:00 pm		at Delaware	W 68–58	5–0	Bob Carpenter Center (1,450); Newark, DE
11/26/2015*; 8:30 pm		vs. Creighton; Lone Star Showcase	L 66–91	5–1	Cedar Park Center (787); Cedar Park, TX
11/27/2015*; 6:00 pm		vs. Eastern Washington; Lone Star Showcase	W 80–62	6–1	Cedar Park Center; Cedar Park, TX
11/28/2015*; 8:30 pm		vs. No. 19 Northwestern; Lone Star Showcase	L 75–78	6–2	Cedar Park Center (379); Cedar Park, TX
12/05/2015*; 1:00 pm		at Auburn	L 69–83	6–3	Auburn Arena (1,886); Auburn, AL
12/18/2015*; 12:00 pm		vs. Chattanooga; UNCW Christmas Classic	L 61–72	6–4	Trask Coliseum; Wilmington, NC
12/19/2015*; 12:00 pm		vs. Ohio; UNCW Christmas Classic	L 61–64	6–5	Trask Coliseum; Wilmington, NC
12/20/2015*; 1:00 pm, ASN		vs. No. 2 South Carolina; Carolinas Challenge	L 57–88	6–6	Myrtle Beach Convention Center; Myrtle Beach, SC
AAC regular season
12/30/2015; 8:00 pm, ESPN3		at Tulsa	L 79–81 ^{OT}	6–7 (0–1)	Reynolds Center (337); Tulsa, OK
01/02/2016; 1:00 pm, CBSSN		No. 20 South Florida	L 59–61	6–8 (0–2)	Williams Arena (1,454); Greenville, NC
01/05/2016; 7:00 pm, ADN		Tulane	L 51–66	6–9 (0–3)	Williams Arena (993); Greenville, NC
01/07/2016; 7:00 pm		at UCF	W 71–56	7–9 (1–3)	CFE Arena (354); Orlando, FL
01/14/2016; 7:00 pm, ADN		Houston	W 76–70	8–9 (2–3)	Williams Arena (1,094); Greenville, NC
01/17/2016; 2:00 pm, ESPNU		at No. 19 South Florida	L 54–75	8–10 (2–4)	USF Sun Dome (2,101); Tampa, FL
01/20/2016; 7:00 pm		Cincinnati	W 63–60	9–10 (3–4)	Williams Arena (1,198); Greenville, NC
01/23/2016; 3:00 pm, ADN		at Tulane	L 73–78	9–11 (3–5)	Devlin Fieldhouse (1,136); New Orleans, LA
01/30/2016; 2:30 pm, ESPN3		Temple	L 63–83	9–12 (3–6)	Williams Arena (1,699); Greenville, NC
02/03/2016; 7:00 pm, ESPN3		Tulsa	L 54–55	9–13 (3–7)	Williams Arena (1,432); Greenville, NC
02/06/2016; 1:00 pm, SNY/ESPN3		at No. 1 Connecticut	L 46–92	9–14 (3–8)	Gampel Pavilion (9,780); Storrs, CT
02/09/2016; 8:00 pm		at SMU	L 66–74 ^{OT}	9–15 (3–9)	Moody Coliseum (636); Dallas, TX
02/13/2016; 5:00 pm, ESPN3		Memphis	L 78–79 ^{OT}	9–16 (3–10)	Williams Arena (2,169); Greenville, NC
02/17/2016; 8:00 pm, ADN		at Houston	W 68–59	10–16 (4–10)	Hofheinz Pavilion (105); Houston, TX
02/20/2016; 8:00 pm, CBSSN		No. 1 Connecticut	L 41–84	10–17 (4–11)	Williams Arena (3,781); Greenville, NC
02/24/2016; 7:00 pm		at Cincinnati	W 77–55	11–17 (5–11)	Fifth Third Arena (458); Cincinnati, OH
02/27/2016; 3:00 pm, ADN		at Memphis	L 83–93 ^{OT}	11–18 (5–12)	Elma Roane Fieldhouse (1,617); Memphis, TN
02/29/2016; 7:00 pm		SMU	W 78–61	12–18 (6–12)	Williams Arena (1,190); Greenville, NC
American Athletic Conference Women's Tournament
03/04/2016; 4:00 pm, ESPN3		vs. Cincinnati; First Round	W 70–61	13–18	Mohegan Sun Arena (4,480); Uncasville, CT
03/05/2016; 2:00 pm, ESPN3		vs. No. 1 Connecticut; Quarterfinals	L 51–92	13–19	Mohegan Sun Arena (7,033); Uncasville, CT
*Non-conference game. ^{#}Rankings from AP Poll. (#) Tournament seedings in parentheses. All times are in Eastern Time.

== Rankings ==
2015–16 NCAA Division I women's basketball rankings

Regular season polls
Poll	Pre- season	Week 2	Week 3	Week 4	Week 5	Week 6	Week 7	Week 8	Week 9	Week 10	Week 11	Week 12	Week 13	Week 14	Week 15	Week 16	Week 17	Week 18	Final
AP	NR	NR	NR	NR	NR	NR	NR	NR	NR	NR	NR	NR	NR	NR	NR	NR	NR	NR	NR
Coaches	NR	NR	RV	NR	NR	NR	NR	NR	NR	NR	NR	NR	NR	NR	NR	NR	NR	NR	NR

Legend
	Increase in ranking
	Decrease in ranking
	Not ranked previous week
(RV)	Received Votes

== See also ==
- 2015–16 East Carolina Pirates men's basketball team
