= 2015–16 Tulane Green Wave women's basketball team =

Intercollegiate basketball season

2015–16 Tulane Green Wave women's basketball
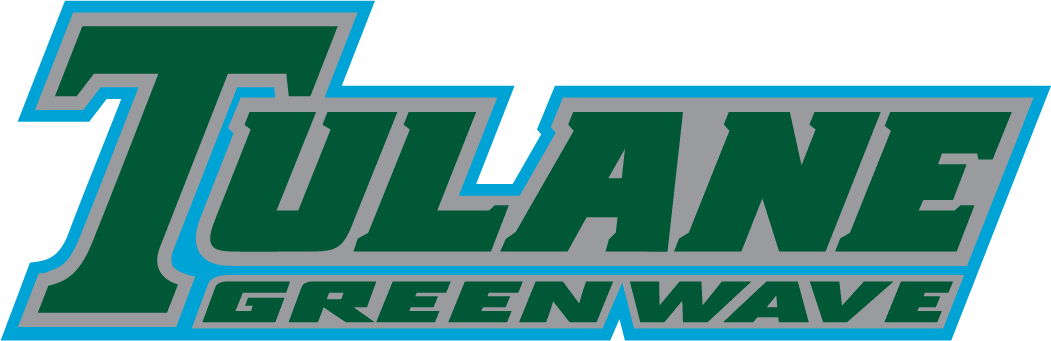

WNIT, Third Round
- Conference: American Athletic Conference
- Record: 23–12 (11–7 The American)
- Head coach: Lisa Stockton (22nd season)
- Assistant coaches: Alan Frey; Doshia Woods; Beth Dunkenberger
- Home arena: Devlin Fieldhouse

2015–16 American Athletic Conference women's basketball standings
	Conf.				Overall
Team	W		L	PCT	W		L	PCT
No. 1 UConn †	18	–	0	1.000	38	–	0	1.000
No. 21 South Florida	14	–	4	.778	24	–	10	.706
Temple	13	–	5	.722	23	–	12	.657
Memphis	12	–	6	.667	18	–	13	.581
Tulane	11	–	7	.611	23	–	12	.657
Tulsa	8	–	10	.444	12	–	19	.387
SMU	7	–	11	.389	13	–	18	.419
East Carolina	6	–	12	.333	13	–	19	.406
Cincinnati	4	–	14	.222	8	–	22	.267
UCF	4	–	14	.222	7	–	23	.233
Houston	2	–	16	.111	6	–	24	.200
† American Tournament winner As of April 5, 2016; Rankings from AP poll

The 2015–16 Tulane Green Wave women's basketball team represented Tulane University during the 2015–16 NCAA Division I women's basketball season. The Green Wave, led by twenty-second year head coach Lisa Stockton, played their home games at Devlin Fieldhouse and were second year members of the American Athletic Conference. They finished the season 23–12, 11–7 in AAC play to finish in fifth place. They advanced to the semifinals of the American Athletic women's tournament, where they lost to Connecticut. They were invited to the Women's National Invitational Tournament, where they defeated Alabama and Georgia Tech in the first and second rounds before losing to Florida Gulf Coast in the third round.

== Media ==
All Green Wave games are broadcast on WRBH 88.3 FM. A video stream for all home games is on Tulane All-Access, ESPN3, or AAC Digital. Road games are typically be streamed on the opponents website, though conference road games could also appear on ESPN3 or AAC Digital.

== Roster ==
2015–16 Tulane Green Wave women's basketball team
Players
Coaches

Pos.	#	Name	Height	Year	Previous school	Hometown
G	1	Shakira Harding	5 ft 7 in (1.7 m)	Jr	Vandrbilt Catholic; Hutchinson CC	Houma, LA
G	3	Kolby Morgan	5 ft 8 in (1.73 m)	So	John Curtis Christian	Hammond, LA
G	11	Leslie Vorpahl	5 ft 6 in (1.68 m)	Jr	Winston Churchill	San Antonio, TX
G	13	Caylah Cruickshank	5 ft 9 in (1.75 m)	So	Dawson College	Montreal, QE
G	14	Taylor Emery	5 ft 10 in (1.78 m)	Fr	Freedom	Tampa, FL
F	15	Adesuwa Ebomwonyi	5 ft 10 in (1.78 m)	Fr	Hillgrove	Powder Springs, GA
G	22	Meredith Schulte	6 ft 0 in (1.83 m)	Fr	Mill Creek	Brasleton, GA
F	25	Harlyn Wyatt	6 ft 2 in (1.88 m)	Fr	Benjamin E. Mays	Atlanta, GA
G	30	Tierra Jones	5 ft 9 in (1.75 m)	RS Sr	Bob Jones	Madison, AL
G	33	Courtnie Latham	5 ft 11 in (1.8 m)	Jr	Clear Springs	Houston, TX
C	34	Ksenija Madzarevic	6 ft 5 in (1.96 m)	Fr	Rabun Gap Nacoochee	Novi Sad, Serbia
C	45	Chinwe Duru	6 ft 2 in (1.88 m)	Sr	Vista Ridge	Round Rock, TX

Head coach

- Lisa Stockton (Wake Forest)

Assistant coach(es)

- Alan Frey (New Orleans)
- Doshia Woods (Western Illinois)
- Beth Dunkenberger (Randolph-Macon)

Legend

- (C) Team captain
- (S) Suspended
- (I) Ineligible
- (W) Walk-on
- Injured
- Current redshirt

Roster

== Schedule and results ==
Date time, TV	Rank^{#}	Opponent^{#}	Result	Record	Site (attendance) city, state
Exhibition
11/05/2015*; 5:30 pm		Loyola (New Orleans)	W 90–48		Devlin Fieldhouse (577); New Orleans, LA
Non-conference regular season
11/13/2015*; 5:30 pm		Arkansas–Little Rock	W 69–53	1–0	Devlin Fieldhouse (357); New Orleans, LA
11/17/2015*; 7:00 pm		Jackson State	W 92–49	2–0	Devlin Fieldhouse (706); New Orleans, LA
11/19/2015*; 6:00 pm, ESPN3		at No. 6 Florida State	L 72–78	2–1	Donald L. Tucker Civic Center (2,756); Tallahassee, FL
11/23/2015*; 7:00 pm, CST/ESPN3		LSU	W 67–63	3–1	Devlin Fieldhouse (2,173); New Orleans, LA
11/26/2015*; 2:15 pm		vs. Rutgers; Paradise Jam tournament Island Division	L 51–75	3–2	Sports and Fitness Center (488); Saint Thomas, USVI
11/27/2015*; 12:00 pm		vs. Green Bay; Paradise Jam Tournament Island Division	L 58–79	3–3	Sports and Fitness Center; Saint Thomas, USVI
11/28/2015*; 12:00 pm		vs. Virginia; Paradise Jam Tournament Island Division	W 67–62	4–3	Sports and Fitness Center; Saint Thomas, USVI
12/06/2015*; 2:00 pm		McNeese State	W 74–55	5–3	Devlin Fieldhouse (962); New Orleans, LA
12/16/2015*; 6:00 pm		at Ole Miss	W 61–59	6–3	Tad Smith Coliseum (734); Oxford, MS
12/18/2015*; 3:00 pm		Southern	W 77–48	7–3	Devlin Fieldhouse (878); New Orleans, LA
12/20/2015*; 5:00 pm		UNC Greensboro; Tulane Classic semifinals	W 74–53	8–3	Devlin Fieldhouse (882); New Orleans, LA
12/21/2015*; 5:00 pm		Saint Louis; Tulane Classic championship	W 66–58	9–3	Devlin Fieldhouse (723); New Orleans, LA
Conference regular season
12/30/2015; 7:00 pm, ADN		Houston	W 70–48	10–3 (1–0)	Devlin Fieldhouse (934); New Orleans, LA
01/03/2016; 4:00 pm, ESPNU		at Memphis	L 67–83	10–4 (1–1)	Elma Roane Fieldhouse (631); Memphis, TN
01/05/2016; 6:00 pm, ADN		at East Carolina	W 66–51	11–4 (2–1)	Williams Arena (993); Greenville, NC
01/10/2016; 4:00 pm		UCF	W 75–54	12–4 (3–1)	Devlin Fieldhouse (994); New Orleans, LA
01/13/2016; 7:00 pm, ESPN3		No. 19 South Florida	L 67–71	12–5 (3–2)	Devlin Fieldhouse (1,646); New Orleans, LA
01/16/2016; 1:00 pm, ADN		at Tulsa	W 71–47	13–5 (4–2)	Reynolds Center (377); Tulsa, OK
01/20/2016; 7:00 pm, ESPN3		at SMU	W 54–42	14–5 (5–2)	Moody Coliseum (612); Dallas, TX
01/23/2016; 2:00 pm, ADN		East Carolina	W 78–73	15–5 (6–2)	Devlin Fieldhouse (1,136); New Orleans, LA
01/26/2016; 7:00 pm, ADN		Temple	L 54–72	15–6 (6–3)	Devlin Fieldhouse (992); New Orleans, LA
02/03/2016; 7:00 pm, SNY/ESPN3		No. 1 Connecticut	L 38–96	15–7 (6–4)	Devlin Fieldhouse (2,983); New Orleans, LA
02/06/2016; 2:00 pm		at Houston	W 59–56	16–7 (7–4)	Hofheinz Pavilion (497); Houston, TX
02/09/2016; 6:00 pm, ADN		at No. 22 South Florida	L 65–77	16–8 (7–5)	USF Sun Dome (2,011); Tampa, FL
02/14/2016; 2:00 pm, ADN		SMU	W 76–64	17–8 (8–5)	Devlin Fieldhouse (1,159); New Orleans, LA
02/17/2016; 6:00 pm		at UCF	W 65–53	18–8 (9–5)	CFE Arena (472); Orlando, FL
02/20/2016; 1:00 pm, ADN		Tulsa	W 61–42	19–8 (10–5)	Devlin Fieldhouse (1,436); New Orleans, LA
02/23/2016; 7:00 pm		at Temple	L 67–72	19–9 (10–6)	McGonigle Hall (1,074); Philadelphia, PA
02/27/2016; 7:00 pm, SNY/ESPN3		at No. 1 Connecticut	L 40–80	19–10 (10–7)	Gampel Pavilion (10,167); Storrs, CT
02/29/2016; 7:00 pm, ESPN3		Cincinnati	W 70–51	20–10 (11–7)	Devlin Fieldhouse (1,428); New Orleans, LA
American Athletic Conference Women's tournament
03/05/2016; 11:00 am, ESPN3		vs. Memphis; Quarterfinals	W 70–64	21–10	Mohegan Sun Arena (7,033); Uncasville, CT
03/06/2016; 4:30 pm, ESPNU		vs. No. 1 Connecticut; Semifinals	L 35–82	21–11	Mohegan Sun Arena; Uncasville, CT
WNIT
03/16/2016*; 7:00 pm		Alabama; First Round	W 53–52	22–11	Devlin Fieldhouse (627); New Orleans, LA
03/21/2016*; 6:00 pm		at Georgia Tech; Second Round	W 64–61	23–11	Hank McCamish Pavilion (585); Atlanta, GA
03/23/2016*; 6:00 pm, ESPN3		at Florida Gulf Coast; Third Round	L 61–73	23–12	Alico Arena (1,641); Fort Myers, FL
*Non-conference game. ^{#}Rankings from AP Poll. (#) Tournament seedings in parentheses. All times are in Central Time.

== Rankings ==
Regular season polls
Poll	Pre- Season	Week 2	Week 3	Week 4	Week 5	Week 6	Week 7	Week 8	Week 9	Week 10	Week 11	Week 12	Week 13	Week 14	Week 15	Week 16	Week 17	Week 18	Final
AP	NR	NR	NR	NR	NR	NR	NR	NR	NR	NR	NR	NR	NR	NR	NR	NR	NR	NR	NR
Coaches	NR	NR	RV	NR	NR	NR	RV	RV	NR	NR	RV	RV	NR	NR	NR	NR	NR	NR	NR

Legend
	Increase in ranking
	Decrease in ranking
	Not ranked previous week
(RV)	Received Votes

== See also ==
- 2015–16 Tulane Green Wave men's basketball team
