= Ronald Hughey =

American college basketball coach (born 1970)

Current position
- Title: Assistant coach
- Team: Virginia
- Conference: Atlantic Coast Conference

Biographical details
- Born: November 7, 1970 (age 55); Columbia, South Carolina
- Education: South Carolina State University

Coaching career (HC unless noted)
- 2004–2007: South Carolina State (asst.)
- 2007–2008: South Carolina (asst.)
- 2008–2009: UCF (asst.)
- 2009–2010: Rutgers (asst.)
- 2010–2012: Texas (asst.)
- 2012–2014: Florida State (asst.)
- 2014–2025: Houston
- 2025–present: Virginia (asst.)

Head coaching record
- Overall: 140–195 (.418)

Ronald Hughey (born November 7, 1970) is an American college basketball coach. He was the head coach for the University of Houston women's basketball team, which he coached for eleven years, from 2014 to 2025. Prior to that, he served as an assistant coach for several other college women's basketball programs.

== Career ==
Hughey was born in Columbia, South Carolina, and attended C.A. Johnson High School. There he was the football team’s starting quarterback, and he also played a pivotal role in the basketball team winning its first state championship in 1989. He attended college at South Carolina State University before transferring to Limestone University, where he earned his bachelor's degree. He began his career coaching boy's high school basketball at C.A. Johnson, and several preparatory schools in South Carolina from 2001 to 2004.

Hughey began his college career as an assistant coach for the South Carolina State University women's basketball team, which he coached from 2004 to 2007. In 2007, he took an assistant coaching position with the University of South Carolina, where he stayed for one season; the team made the Women's National Invitation Tournament (WNIT). Over the next six years, Hughey held assistant coaching positions at the University of Central Florida, Rutgers University, the University of Texas, and Florida State University. His teams made the NCAA Division I women's basketball tournament in all six seasons.

Hughey became the head coach of the Houston Cougars women's basketball team in 2014. He led the Cougars for eleven seasons, compiling a 140–195 record. Houston made the WNIT three times during his tenure, in the 2017–18, 2018–19, and 2020–21 seasons. Hughey won his 100th game with Houston in February 2022 with a victory over the East Carolina Pirates. Hughey's resignation was announced in March 2025, following the Cougars' 2024–2025 season.

== Head coaching record ==
Record table
Season	Team	Overall	Conference	Standing	Postseason
Houston (American Athletic Conference) (2014–2023)
2014–15	Houston	6–24	1–17	11th	
2015–16	Houston	6–24	2–16	11th	
2016–17	Houston	12–19	4–12	10th	
2017–18	Houston	20–12	9–7	5th	WNIT First Round
2018–19	Houston	15–16	9–7	4th	WNIT First Round
2019–20	Houston	12–19	5–11	10th	
2020–21	Houston	17–8	12–5	3rd	WNIT First Round
2021–22	Houston	18–16	7–9	6th	
2022–23	Houston	15–16	10–5	4th	
Houston (Big 12 Conference) (2023–2025)
2023–24	Houston	14–16	5–13	T–11th	
2024–25	Houston	5–25	1–17	16th	
Houston:		140–195 (.418)			
Total:		140–195 (.418)			
National champion Postseason invitational champion Conference regular season champion Conference regular season and conference tournament champion Division regular season champion Division regular season and conference tournament champion Conference tournament champion
