= 2023–24 East Carolina Pirates women's basketball team =

Intercollegiate basketball season

2023–24 East Carolina Pirates women's basketball
- Conference: American Athletic Conference
- Record: 19–14 (9–9 The American)
- Head coach: Kim McNeill (5th season)
- Assistant coaches: Cory McNeill; Tamoria Holmes; Jeff Williams
- Home arena: Williams Arena

2023–24 American Athletic Conference women's basketball standings
| | Conf. | | | | Overall |
| Team | W | | L | PCT | W | | L | PCT |
|---|---|---|---|---|---|---|---|---|
| Tulsa | 13 | – | 5 | .722 | 25 | – | 10 | .714 |
| North Texas | 13 | – | 5 | .722 | 23 | – | 9 | .719 |
| Temple | 13 | – | 5 | .722 | 20 | – | 12 | .625 |
| UTSA | 10 | – | 8 | .556 | 18 | – | 15 | .545 |
| South Florida | 10 | – | 8 | .556 | 19 | – | 14 | .576 |
| Charlotte | 9 | – | 9 | .500 | 16 | – | 15 | .516 |
| UAB | 9 | – | 9 | .500 | 18 | – | 14 | .563 |
| Memphis | 9 | – | 9 | .500 | 13 | – | 17 | .433 |
| East Carolina | 9 | – | 9 | .500 | 19 | – | 14 | .576 |
| Rice † | 9 | – | 9 | .500 | 19 | – | 15 | .559 |
| SMU | 8 | – | 10 | .444 | 14 | – | 16 | .467 |
| Florida Atlantic | 6 | – | 12 | .333 | 11 | – | 19 | .367 |
| Wichita State | 5 | – | 13 | .278 | 10 | – | 22 | .313 |
| Tulane | 3 | – | 15 | .167 | 12 | – | 20 | .375 |
† 2024 AAC tournament winner

The 2023–24 East Carolina Pirates women's basketball team represented East Carolina University during the 2023–24 NCAA Division I women's basketball season. The Pirates, led by fifth year head coach Kim McNeill, played their home games at Williams Arena at Minges Coliseum and were ninth year members of the American Athletic Conference.

== Previous season ==
The Pirates finished the 2022–23 season 23–10, 11–5 in AAC play to finish in third place. They won the American Athletic Conference women's tournament, as a result they received an automatic bid to the NCAA women's tournament for the first time since 2007. They lost in the first round to Texas.

== Offseason ==
=== Departures ===
| Name | Number | Pos. | Height | Year | Hometown | Reason for departure |
|---|---|---|---|---|---|---|
| Alexsia Rose | 0 | G | 5'7" | Junior | Bloomfield, CT | Transferred to UMass |
| Paige Lyons | 2 | G | 5'7" | Sophomore | Norcross, GA | Transferred to Wagner |
| Xianna Josephs | 3 | G | 6'0" | Senior | Brampton, ON | Graduated |
| Iycez Adams | 20 | F | 5'11" | Sophomore | Kernsville, NC | Transferred to Elon |
| Brittany Franklin | 31 | C | 6'5" | GS Senior | Plymouth, NC | Graduated |
| Tiara Chambers | 33 | F | 6'3" | GS Senior | Portsmouth, VA | Graduated |
| Samora Watson | 55 | G | 5'6" | Freshman | League City, TX | Transferred to Central Connecticut |

=== Incoming transfers ===
| Name | Number | Pos. | Height | Year | Hometown | Previous school |
|---|---|---|---|---|---|---|
| Taliyah Wyche | 00 | F | 6'3" | Junior | Fort Lauderdale, FL | Florida |
| Tatyana Wyche | 3 | F | 6'2" | Junior | Fort Lauderdale, FL | Florida |

==== Recruiting ====
College recruiting information
| Name | Hometown | School | Height | Weight | Commit date |
|---|---|---|---|---|---|
| Khia Miller; G | Woodbridge, MD | Sidwell Friends School | 5 ft 10 in (1.78 m) | N/A | |
| Khia Miller; G | Recruit ratings: ESPN: (91) | | | | |
Overall recruit ranking:
Note: In many cases, Scout, Rivals, 247Sports, On3, and ESPN may conflict in their listings of height and weight.; In these cases, the average was taken. ESPN grades are on a 100-point scale.; Sources: "2023 Player Commits". ESPN. Archived from the original on December 8, 2023.

== Media ==
All Pirates home and road games will have a video stream on ESPN+.

== Roster ==
2023–24 East Carolina Pirates women's basketball team
Players
Coaches

| Pos. | # | Name | Height | Year | Previous school | Hometown |
|---|---|---|---|---|---|---|
| F | 00 | Taliyah Wyche | 6 ft 3 in (1.91 m) | Jr | American Heritage School; Florida | Fort Lauderdale, FL |
| G | 1 | Micah Dennis | 5 ft 9 in (1.75 m) | GS | Cairine Wilson; Oklahoma State | Toronto, ON |
| F | 2 | Tatyana Wyche | 6 ft 2 in (1.88 m) | Jr | American Heritage School; Florida | Fort Lauderdale, FL |
| G | 3 | Karina Gordon | 5 ft 9 in (1.75 m) | Fr | St. Thomas Aquinas | Hallandale Beach, FL |
| G | 4 | Synia Johnson | 5 ft 9 in (1.75 m) | Sr | Riverdale Baptist | Waldorf, MD |
| G | 5 | Jayla Hearp | 5 ft 9 in (1.75 m) | So | Smithfield | Hampton, VA |
| G | 11 | Khia Miller | 5 ft 10 in (1.78 m) | Fr | Sidwell Friends School | Woodbridge, VA |
| G/F | 12 | Morgan Moseley | 5 ft 11 in (1.8 m) | Sr | Saint James School | Centreville, MD |
| G | 14 | Bobbi Smith | 5 ft 11 in (1.8 m) | So | Southeast Raleigh | Garner, NC |
| F | 15 | Jaedyn Cook | 6 ft 2 in (1.88 m) | Fr | John Marshall High School | Richmond, VA |
| G/F | 20 | Jade Tillman | 5 ft 10 in (1.78 m) | Fr | Good Counsel | Rockville, MD |
| G | 22 | Danae McNeal | 6 ft 0 in (1.83 m) | GS | Swansea; Clemson | Swansea, SC |
| F | 23 | Amiya Joyner | 6 ft 2 in (1.88 m) | So | Farmville Central | Farmville, NC |
| G | 24 | Kimora Jenkins | 6 ft 1 in (1.85 m) | Jr | Millbrook; Georgia | Long Island, NY |

Head coach

- Kim McNeill (Richmond)

Assistant coach(es)

- Cory McNeill (Morgan State)
- Tamoria Holmes (Howard)
- Jeff Williams (Howard)

Legend

- (C) Team captain
- (S) Suspended
- (I) Ineligible
- (W) Walk-on
- Injured
- Current redshirt

Roster

== Schedule and results ==
| Date time, TV | Rank^{#} | Opponent^{#} | Result | Record | High points | High rebounds | High assists | Site (attendance) city, state |
Non-conference regular season
| November 6, 2023*; 7:00 p.m., FloSports | | at Elon | W 68–37 | 1–0 | 22 – McNeal | 10 – Tat. Wyche | 5 – Johnson | Schar Center (692); Elon, NC |
| November 9, 2023*; 6:00 p.m., ESPN+ | | USC Upstate | W 105–35 | 2–0 | 18 – Joyner | 8 – Joyner | 4 – Dennis | Williams Arena (1,353); Greenville, NC |
| November 14, 2023*; 6:00 p.m., ESPN+ | | at VCU | L 50–55 | 2–1 | 18 – McNeal | 11 – Joyner | 4 – Johnson | Siegel Center (549); Richmond, VA |
| November 20, 2023*; 1:30 p.m., FloSports | | vs. No. 15 Ohio State; Baha Mar Pink Flamingo Championship | L 55–79 | 2–2 | 14 – Johnson | 9 – Joyner | 4 – Dennis | Baha Mar Convention Center (391); Nassau, Bahamas |
| November 22, 2023*; 11:00 a.m., FloSports | | vs. Seton Hall; Baha Mar Pink Flamingo Championship | L 57–68 | 2–3 | 17 – McNeal | 6 – Dennis | 3 – Dennis | Baha Mar Convention Center; Nassau, Bahamas |
| November 29, 2023*; 11:00 a.m., ESPN+ | | Hampton | W 75–55 | 3–3 | 31 – McNeal | 10 – Tat. Wyche | 7 – Dennis | Williams Arena (6,166); Greenville, NC |
| December 2, 2023*; 2:00 p.m., ESPN+ | | Coppin State | W 59–51 | 4–3 | 17 – Tied | 7 – Joyner | 4 – Dennis | Williams Arena (1,088); Greenville, NC |
| December 4, 2023*; 6:30 p.m., ESPN+ | | Maryland Eastern Shore | W 72–57 | 5–3 | 34 – McNeal | 10 – Tat. Wyche | 6 – Dennis | Williams Arena (1,053); Greenville, NC |
| December 18, 2023*; 6:00 p.m., ESPN+ | | George Mason | W 65–44 | 6–3 | 27 – Joyner | 16 – Joyner | 6 – Dennis | Williams Arena (1,141); Greenville, NC |
| December 21, 2023*; 1:00 p.m., ESPN+ | | Charleston Southern | W 75–46 | 7–3 | 16 – Gordon | 11 – Joyner | 6 – Joyner | Williams Arena (1,092); Greenville, NC |
| December 30, 2023*; 12:00 p.m., ESPN2 | | No. 1 South Carolina | L 36–73 | 7–4 | 10 – Joyner | 6 – Tied | 1 – Tied | Williams Arena (5,717); Greenville, NC |
AAC regular season
| January 2, 2024; 6:00 p.m., ESPN+ | | UTSA | W 82–54 | 8–4 (1–0) | 22 – Gordon | 13 – Tat. Wyche | 7 – Gordon | Williams Arena (956); Greenville, NC |
| January 6, 2024; 3:00 p.m., ESPN+ | | at Memphis | W 64–63 | 9–4 (2–0) | 17 – McNeal | 7 – Joyner | 4 – McNeal | Elma Roane Fieldhouse (1,315); Memphis, TN |
| January 10, 2024; 6:00 p.m., ESPN+ | | UAB | L 64–73 | 9–5 (2–1) | 18 – McNeal | 15 – Joyner | 3 – Joyner | Williams Arena (1,114); Greenville, NC |
| January 13, 2024; 3:00 p.m., ESPN+ | | at Tulane | L 55–81 | 9–6 (2–2) | 12 – McNeal | 8 – Joyner | 2 – Tat. Wyche | Devlin Fieldhouse (709); New Orleans, LA |
| January 17, 2024; 11:00 a.m., ESPN+ | | Rice | L 67–80 | 9–7 (2–3) | 19 – McNeal | 11 – Joyner | 8 – Joyner | Williams Arena (5,552); Greenville, NC |
| January 20, 2024; 2:00 p.m., ESPN+ | | SMU | W 68–61 | 10–7 (3–3) | 35 – McNeal | 8 – Joyner | 3 – Tied | Williams Arena (1,259); Greenville, NC |
| January 25, 2024; 7:00 p.m., ESPN+ | | at Florida Atlantic | W 78–71 | 11–7 (4–3) | 30 – McNeal | 9 – Joyner | 2 – McNeal | Eleanor R. Baldwin Arena (435); Boca Raton, FL |
| January 28, 2024; 12:00 p.m., ESPNU | | at South Florida | L 40–54 | 11–8 (4–4) | 25 – McNeal | 9 – McNeal | 1 – Tied | Yuengling Center (2,984); Tampa, FL |
| February 1, 2024; 6:00 p.m., ESPN+ | | Tulsa | W 56–48 | 12–8 (5–4) | 17 – McNeal | 6 – Tied | 4 – Tied | Williams Arena (968); Greenville, NC |
| February 4, 2024; 3:00 p.m., ESPN+ | | at Wichita State | W 72–51 | 13–8 (6–4) | 23 – McNeal | 12 – Tat. Wyche | 5 – McNeal | Charles Koch Arena (1,500); Wichita, KS |
| February 10, 2024; 2:00 p.m., ESPN+ | | Charlotte | W 70–56 | 14–8 (7–4) | 24 – Joyner | 13 – Joyner | 6 – McNeal | Williams Arena (1,363); Greenville, NC |
| February 14, 2024; 8:00 p.m., ESPN+ | | at Rice | L 57–75 | 14–9 (7–5) | 22 – McNeal | 7 – Tal. Wyche | 4 – McNeal | Tudor Fieldhouse (623); Houston, TX |
| February 17, 2024; 2:00 p.m., ESPN+ | | Memphis | L 70–72 | 14–10 (7–6) | 28 – McNeal | 20 – Joyner | 6 – Joyner | Williams Arena (1,287); Greenville, NC |
| February 21, 2024; 6:00 p.m., ESPN+ | | South Florida | L 68–78 | 14–11 (7–7) | 25 – McNeal | 10 – Joyner | 6 – Gordon | Williams Arena (1,106); Greenville, NC |
| February 24, 2024; 3:00 p.m., ESPN+ | | at SMU | W 84–74 | 15–11 (8–7) | 22 – McNeal | 13 – Joyner | 3 – Tied | Moody Coliseum (1,021); University Park, TX |
| February 27, 2024; 7:30 p.m., ESPN+ | | at North Texas | L 91–93 ^{4OT} | 15–12 (8–8) | 32 – McNeal | 16 – Joyner | 3 – Joyner | The Super Pit (1,542); Denton, TX |
| March 3, 2024; 2:00 p.m., ESPN+ | | Temple | L 66–81 | 15–13 (8–9) | 21 – McNeal | 7 – Tat. Wyche | 4 – McNeal | Williams Arena (1,170); Greenville, NC |
| March 5, 2024; 6:30 p.m., ESPN+ | | at Charlotte | W 71–66 | 16–13 (9–9) | 25 – McNeal | 16 – Joyner | 4 – Tied | Dale F. Halton Arena (803); Charlotte, NC |
AAC Women's Tournament
| March 10, 2024; 1:00 p.m., ESPN+ | (9) | vs. (8) Memphis; Second Round | W 65–63 | 17–13 | 19 – McNeal | 17 – Tat. Wyche | 4 – Tied | Dickies Arena (1,506); Fort Worth, TX |
| March 11, 2024; 1:00 p.m., ESPN+ | (9) | vs. (1) Tulsa; Quarterfinals | W 75–71 | 18–13 | 29 – McNeal | 14 – Joyner | 4 – Gordon | Dickies Arena; Fort Worth, TX |
| March 12, 2024; 7:00 p.m., ESPN+ | (9) | vs. (4) UTSA; Semifinals | W 55–54 | 19–13 | 15 – Joyner | 13 – Joyner | 4 – Mcneal | Dickies Arena (1,520); Fort Worth, TX |
| March 13, 2024; 7:00 p.m., ESPNU | (9) | vs. (10) Rice; Championship | L 41–61 | 19–14 | 14 – McNeal | 8 – Joyner | 3 – Miller | Dickies Arena; Fort Worth, TX |
*Non-conference game. ^{#}Rankings from AP Poll. (#) Tournament seedings in parentheses. All times are in Eastern Time.

== Rankings ==
Ranking movements Legend: — = Not ranked
| | Week | | | | | | | | | | | | | | | | | | | |
| Poll | Pre | 1 | 2 | 3 | 4 | 5 | 6 | 7 | 8 | 9 | 10 | 11 | 12 | 13 | 14 | 15 | 16 | 17 | 18 | Final |
|---|---|---|---|---|---|---|---|---|---|---|---|---|---|---|---|---|---|---|---|---|
| AP | — | —* | — | — | — | | | | | | | | | | | | | | | Not released |
| Coaches | — | —* | —^ | — | — | | | | | | | | | | | | | | | |

*The preseason and week 1 polls were the same.

== See also ==
- 2023–24 East Carolina Pirates men's basketball team
