= Heather Macy =

American basketball player and coach

Current position
- Title: Head coach
- Team: Georgia Southern
- Conference: Sun Belt
- Record: 0-2 (.000)

Biographical details
- Born: April 4, 1978 (age 48); Hamptonville, North Carolina, U.S.

Playing career
- 1996–2000: Greensboro

Coaching career (HC unless noted)
- 2000–2001: Catawba (Asst.)
- 2001–2002: Lenoir-Rhyne (Asst.)
- 2002–2004: High Point (Asst.)
- 2004–2005: UMBC (Asst.)
- 2005–2007: Pfeiffer
- 2007–2010: Francis Marion
- 2010–2018: East Carolina
- 2019–2020: Spartanburg Methodist
- 2020–2023: Greensboro
- 2023–2025: Barry
- 2025–2026: Nova Southeastern
- 2026–present: Georgia Southern

Head coaching record
- Overall: 355–209 (.632)

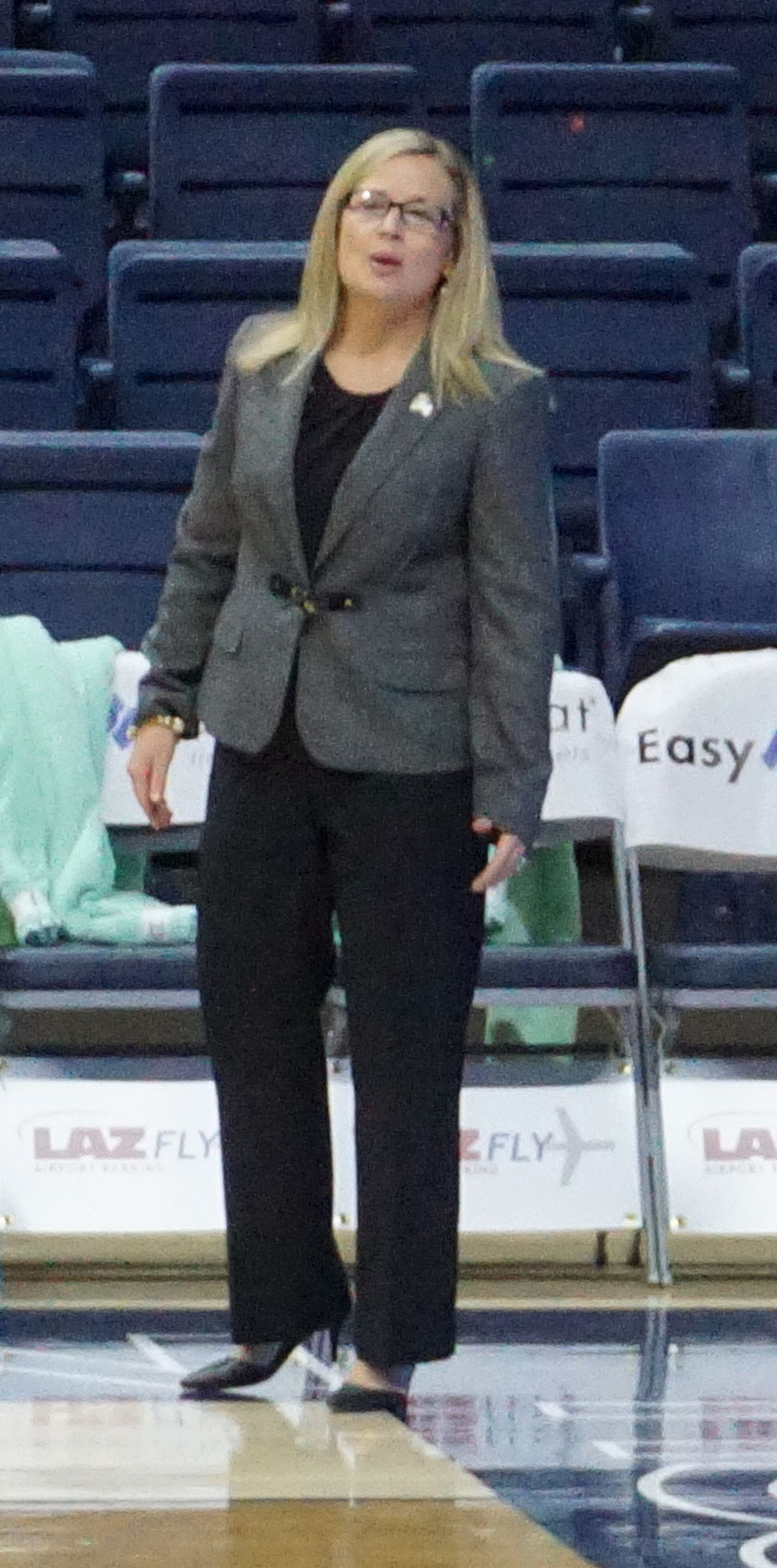

Heather Michell Macy (born April 4, 1978) is an American college basketball coach who is the current Head Coach at Georgia Southern University and is the all-time winningest head coach of the East Carolina University women's basketball team. Macy is also the Elite Performance CEO for the 2FeetIn organization and the author of the books Two Feet Forward and Believe-Think-Live Two Feet In.

== High school career ==
Macy attended Starmount High School in Boonville, North Carolina from 1992 to 1996. She played on the women's basketball team as the starting point guard from 1994 to 1996. Macy's accomplishments led her to be named all-Tri-County player twice and an All-Northwest 2A conference player. In her senior year, she led her team to a conference tournament championship. Macy recorded 10 points and five assists per game as a sophomore and improved to 14 points per game and six assists as a senior. Her accomplishments led her to be named to the Hall of Fame for her high school, one of 12 members in the first class of inductees.

== College ==
Macy was a four-year letter winner at Greensboro College, where she earned a bachelor of science degree in sport and exercise science. She competed on both the basketball and tennis teams. As a basketball player, Macy scored 707 points while at Greensboro, which placed her 11th on the school's career scoring list. She also recorded 207 assists, which ranked her in the top 10 for the school and is a member of the school's Hall of Fame. After completing her undergraduate degree, Macy attended the University of Southern Mississippi for two summers, where she earned a master's degree in human performance and recreation in 2002.

== Coaching career ==
She began her coaching career immediately after graduating from Greensboro as an assistant at Division II Catawba College. She served as an assistant at Catawba for a single year and then became an assistant at Division II Lenoir–Rhyne University. She then served as an assistant for two years at two Division I schools, High Point University and then a year at University of Maryland, Baltimore County.

=== Pfeiffer University ===
Macy took on her first head coaching position as the head coach at Pfeiffer University in 2005. In her first year, she took over a team with a record of 8–20 and just four returning players and guided the team to a record of 14–15. In Macy's second year, the team improved to 26–5 overall, and 18–3 in the conference to win the regular season conference as well as the conference tournament. The team was invited to the NCAA Division II postseason tournament, where they lost in the first round. Macy was named the conference coach of the year in 2007. Macy's two-year winning percentage of .667 is the second best among all Pfeiffer coaches and the best among coaches with more than a single year.

== Francis Marion ==
Macy was hired to be the head coach at Francis Marion University in 2007. In the first season, she guided the team to a 21–9 record, finishing first in the Peach Belt Conference and earning an invitation to the NCAA Division II postseason tournament. Using coaching methods Macy learned and implemented up over the years, the team improved in the second year to 27–5 overall, again finishing first in the conference and going to the NCAA tournament, where they reached the Sweet 16. In Macy's third and final year at Francis Marion, the team again went 27–5, finishing second in the conference and reaching the second round of the postseason NCAA Division II tournament. Macy was named the conference coach of the year in both 2008 and 2009. The team finished the season ranked #20 in the USA Today/ESPN Division II Top 25 poll. Macy left the school for East Carolina University at the end of the season.

== East Carolina ==
In 2010, Macy was hired by Division I East Carolina to head their women's basketball program. Macy's teams recorded the highest grade point averages among all Conference USA women's basketball team in both 2012–13 and 2013–14. In 2014, she received a five-year extension to her contract, which thus extended through the 2019–20 season. On October 17, 2018, Macy resigned amid an internal review. She left the Pirates as the all-time winningest coach in program history.

== Spartanburg Methodist ==
During the 2019–20 season, Macy served as the head women’s basketball coach at Spartanburg Methodist College. During her lone season with the Pioneers, Macy led her team to Region X regular-season and tournament championships while posting a 21–8 record and being named Region X Coach of the Year.

== Greensboro ==
On September 24, 2020 Macy was named head coach and Assistant Director of Athletics at Greensboro College in North Carolina. Last season, Coach Macy led the Pride to the regular season USA South Championship, with an 18–0 conference record, 26–3 overall, while also leading the Pride to the tournament championship title, qualifying Greensboro for their first trip to the NCAA Tournament since 2015. Over the past two seasons, under Macy's leadership, the Pride have an overall record of 51–5 and have only lost one conference game (35–1). During the 2022–23 season she mentored the USA South Conference Player of the Year and the USA South Defensive Player of the Year, in addition to having to two players selected to the D3Hoops.com NCAA Division III All-Region Six teams. Her 2022–23 team placed in the top 35 in 14 NCAA statistical categories, while six of her players were ranked in the individual NCAA statistical categories. In 2021–22, Macy mentored two players to the All USA South First team, and her team finished in the top 10 of scoring offenses nationally, at over 84 points per game, as well as 9th nationally in scoring margin (24.4 points) and 13th nationally in field goal percentage (34.2%). She earned her 300th career victory in Greensboro's February 12, 2022 win over Meredith.

== Barry ==
On May 31, 2023, Macy was named the 7th head women's basketball coach in the history of Barry University. Macy's first season with the Bucs lead to a record of 9-19. Only in her second season with the Bucs, Macy led the team to a +10 win turnaround, earning a #5 seed in the Sunshine State Conference Tournament while beating two nationally ranked teams in the regular season. The Buccaneers finished first in four statistical categories which included scoring, rebounds, offensive rebounds, and steals. Macy had one player named First-Team All-Sunshine State Conference while another was named to the All-Sunshine State Conference Defensive Team. Macy also recruited and coached the Sunshine State Conference Freshman of the Year. Heather Macy earned her 350th career win on February 5 with a win against Saint Leo. The Bucs finished strong winning 6 of their final 8 games.

== 2FeetIn ==
Coach Macy is also the Elite Performance CEO for the 2FeetIn organization and the author of the books Two Feet Forward and Believe-Think-Live Two Feet In. She currently travels around the country educating teams, coaches, and organizations on how to use EQ to become an elite performer. Several of these presentations are currently published on CoachTube.com for download. She has been a speaker at some of the top coaching clinics and professional development events in the country, including USA Basketball and Nike Championship Clinics. Coach Macy is also a frequent speaker at corporate and leadership events on the topics of leadership, teamwork, accountability, and discipline. She is currently hosting a 1-hour weekly Rising Coaches TV series discussing her book, Two Feet Forward: Everyday Lessons in Leadership. This book was a #1 new release in basketball coaching on Amazon.

Combined with her EQ Certification, in the spring of 2020, Coach Macy also received aspecialization in Positive Psychology from the University of Pennsylvania.

== Head coaching record ==
Record table
Season	Team	Overall	Conference	Standing	Postseason
Pfeiffer Falcons (Conference Carolinas) (2005–2007)
2005–06	Pfeiffer	14–15	11–9	3rd	
2006–07	Pfeiffer	26–5	18–3	1st	NCAA first round
Pfeiffer:		40–20 (.667)	29–12 (.707)		
Francis Marion (Peach Belt Conference) (2007–2010)
2007–08	Francis Marion	21–9	13–7	1st	NCAA First Round
2008–09	Francis Marion	27–5	17–3	1st	NCAA Sweet 16
2009–10	Francis Marion	27–5	16–2	2nd	NCAA Second Round
Francis Marion:		75–19 (.798)	46–12 (.793)		
East Carolina Pirates (Conference USA) (2010–2014)
2010–11	East Carolina	16–15	9–7	5th	
2011–12	East Carolina	12–19	5–11	7th	
2012–13	East Carolina	22–10	11–5	2nd	WNIT First Round
2013–14	East Carolina	22–9	10–6	5th	WNIT First Round
East Carolina Pirates (American Athletic Conference) (2014–2018)
2014–15	East Carolina	22–11	11–7	5th	WNIT Second Round
2015–16	East Carolina	13–19	6–12	8th	
2016–17	East Carolina	11–19	2–14	11th	
2017–18	East Carolina	16–15	7–9	7th	
East Carolina:		134–117 (.534)	61–71 (.462)		
Spartanburg Methodist Pioneers (Carolinas Junior College Conference) (2019–2020)
2019–20	Spartanburg Methodist	21–8	5–1		
Spartanburg Methodist:		21–8 (.724)	5–1 (.833)		
Greensboro Pride (USA South Athletic Conference) (2020–2023)
2020–23	Greensboro	57–14	41–9		
Greensboro:		57–14 (.803)	57–14 (.803)		
Georgia Southern Eagles (Sun Belt) (2026–present)
2026–27	Georgia Southern	0–2	0–0		
Georgia Southern:		0–0 (–)	0–0 (–)		
Total:		333–181 (.648)			
National champion Postseason invitational champion Conference regular season champion Conference regular season and conference tournament champion Division regular season champion Division regular season and conference tournament champion Conference tournament champion
