= 2015–16 Houston Cougars women's basketball team =

Intercollegiate basketball season

2015–16 Houston Cougars women's basketball
- Conference: American Athletic Conference
- Record: 6–24 (2–16 The American)
- Head coach: Ronald Hughey (2nd season)
- Assistant coaches: Ravon Justice; Tai Dillard; Tonya Haut
- Home arena: Hofheinz Pavilion

2015–16 American Athletic Conference women's basketball standings
	Conf.				Overall
Team	W		L	PCT	W		L	PCT
No. 1 UConn †	18	–	0	1.000	38	–	0	1.000
No. 21 South Florida	14	–	4	.778	24	–	10	.706
Temple	13	–	5	.722	23	–	12	.657
Memphis	12	–	6	.667	18	–	13	.581
Tulane	11	–	7	.611	23	–	12	.657
Tulsa	8	–	10	.444	12	–	19	.387
SMU	7	–	11	.389	13	–	18	.419
East Carolina	6	–	12	.333	13	–	19	.406
Cincinnati	4	–	14	.222	8	–	22	.267
UCF	4	–	14	.222	7	–	23	.233
Houston	2	–	16	.111	6	–	24	.200
† American Tournament winner As of April 5, 2016; Rankings from AP poll

The 2015–16 Houston Cougars women's basketball team represented the University of Houston during the 2015–16 NCAA Division I women's basketball season. This was the Cougars' third season as members of the American Athletic Conference. Led by second-year head coach Ronald Hughey, they played their home games at Hofheinz Pavilion. They finished the season 6–24, 2–16 in the American play to finish in last place. They lost in the first round of American Athletic women's tournament to Tulsa.

== Media ==
All Cougars games aired on the Houston Cougars IMG Sports Network, streamed online via the Houston Portal, with Jeremy Branham and Louis Ray on the call. Before conference season home games streamed on Houston All-Access, Conference home games rotated among ESPN3, AAC Digital, and the Houston Portal. Road games typically were streamed on the opponents' websites, though some conference road games also appeared on ESPN3 or AAC Digital.

== Roster ==
2015–16 Houston Cougars women's basketball team
Players
Coaches

Pos.	#	Name	Height	Year	Previous school	Hometown
G	1	Chyanne Butler	5 ft 6 in (1.68 m)	So	Junípero Serra; USC	Costa Mesa, CA
C	2	Jacqueline Blake	6 ft 2 in (1.88 m)	Jr	Coral Springs Christian; Miami Dade College	Miami, FL
G	3	Bianca Winlow	5 ft 7 in (1.7 m)	Sr	Bellaire	Bellaire, TX
G	5	Dionna Collins	5 ft 5 in (1.65 m)	Jr	Del City; Redlands CC	Del City, OK
G	10	Cenecia Newman	5 ft 10 in (1.78 m)	Fr	Cedar Hill	Cedar Hill, TX
F	12	Brianne Coffman (I) (redshirt)	6 ft 3 in (1.91 m)	Sr	Jarrell; Oklahoma State	Jarrell, TX
G	15	Alecia Smith	5 ft 7 in (1.7 m)	Jr	Cedar Hill	Cedar Hill, TX
G	21	Jessieka Palmer	6 ft 1 in (1.85 m)	Sr	La Marque	La Marque, TX
F	22	Marche' Amerson	6 ft 1 in (1.85 m)	Sr	Rudder	Bryan, TX
G	23	Serithia Hawkins	5 ft 11 in (1.8 m)	Fr	Southmoore	Moore, OK
G	24	Mariah Mitchell	5 ft 9 in (1.75 m)	So	McKinney	McKinney, TX
G	25	Kierra Graves	5 ft 7 in (1.7 m)	Jr	Morgan Park; Kaskaskia College	Chicago, IL
C	32	Sharayla Brown	6 ft 3 in (1.91 m)	Fr	East Central	Tulsa, OK
F	33	Tyler Gilbert	6 ft 2 in (1.88 m)	Sr	Hightower	Missouri City, TX
F	35	Taylor Gilbert	6 ft 2 in (1.88 m)	RS Jr	Hightower	Missouri City, TX

Head coach

- Ronald Hughey (Limestone College)

Assistant coach(es)

- Ravon Justice (Houston Baptist)
- Tai Dillard (Texas)
- Tonya Haut (Baylor)/ (TCU)

Legend

- (C) Team captain
- (S) Suspended
- (I) Ineligible
- (W) Walk-on
- Injured
- Current redshirt

Roster

== Schedule and results ==
Date time, TV	Rank^{#}	Opponent^{#}	Result	Record	Site (attendance) city, state
Exhibition
11/08/2015*; 2:00 pm		Texas A&M–International	W 59–42		Hofheinz Pavilion (337); Houston, TX
Non-conference regular season
11/13/2015*; 3:00 pm		at College of Charleston	L 48–55	0–1	TD Arena (681); Charleston, SC
11/19/2015*; 7:00 pm		Long Beach State	L 41–47	0–2	Hofheinz Pavilion (265); Houston, TX
11/21/2015*; 7:00 pm		Louisiana–Lafayette	W 52–51	1–2	Hofheinz Pavilion (909); Houston, TX
11/26/2015*; 1:30 pm		vs. No. 24 George Washington; Lone Star Showcase	L 78–82	1–3	Cedar Park Center (507); Cedar Park, TX
11/27/2015*; 11:00 am		vs. Wright State; Lone Star Showcase	L 61–75	1–4	Cedar Park Center; Cedar Park, TX
11/28/2015*; 11:00 am		vs. No. 25 Iowa; Lone Star Showcase	L 50–64	1–5	Cedar Park Center; Cedar Park, TX
12/05/2015*; 4:00 pm		at Rice; Bayou Cup	W 62–59	2–5	Tudor Fieldhouse (684); Houston, TX
12/07/2015*; 6:00 pm		at Incarnate Word	W 67–51	3–5	McDermott Center (502); San Antonio, TX
12/12/2015*; 2:00 pm		UNLV	L 60–63	3–6	Hofheinz Pavilion (921); Houston, TX
12/17/2015*; 7:00 pm		at Texas A&M–Corpus Christi	W 76–73	4–6	Dugan Wellness Center (457); Corpus Christi, TX
12/20/2015*; 7:00 pm		Texas–Rio Grande Valley	L 45–55	4–7	Hofheinz Pavilion (792); Houston, TX
AAC regular season
12/30/2015; 7:00 pm, ADN		at Tulane	L 48–70	4–8 (0–1)	Devlin Fieldhouse (934); New Orleans, LA
01/02/2016; 2:00 pm		Temple	L 66–75	4–9 (0–2)	Hofheinz Pavilion (1,308); Houston, TX
01/05/2016; 5:00 pm		at Memphis	L 57–74	4–10 (0–3)	Elma Roane Fieldhouse (326); Memphis, TN
01/08/2016; 8:00 pm, ESPN2		No. 1 Connecticut	L 37–76	4–11 (0–4)	Hofheinz Pavilion (1,553); Houston, TX
01/10/2016; 2:00 pm		SMU	L 48–50	4–12 (0–5)	Hofheinz Pavilion (878); Houston, TX
01/14/2016; 6:00 pm, ADN		at East Carolina	L 70–76	4–13 (0–6)	Williams Arena (1,094); Greenville, NC
01/20/2016; 7:00 pm		Tulsa	L 62–79	4–14 (0–7)	Hofheinz Pavilion (154); Houston, TX
01/27/2016; 6:00 pm		at No. 20 South Florida	L 49–73	4–15 (0–8)	USF Sun Dome (1,885); Tampa, FL
01/30/2016; 1:00 pm		at Cincinnati	L 50–56	4–16 (0–9)	Fifth Third Arena (456); Cincinnati, OH
02/03/2016; 7:00 pm		UCF	W 64–55	5–16 (1–9)	Hofheinz Pavilion (274); Houston, TX
02/06/2016; 2:00 pm		Tulane	L 56–59	5–17 (1–10)	Hofheinz Pavilion (497); Houston, TX
02/10/2016; 7:00 pm		at Tulsa	L 28–44	5–18 (1–11)	Reynolds Center (467); Tulsa, OK
02/12/2016; 6:00 pm, ESPN3		at Temple	L 48–78	5–19 (1–12)	McGonigle Hall (1,298); Philadelphia, PA
02/17/2016; 7:00 pm, ADN		East Carolina	L 59–68	5–20 (1–13)	Hofheinz Pavilion (105); Houston, TX
02/20/2016; 1:00 pm		Cincinnati	L 61–67	5–21 (1–14)	Hofheinz Pavilion (363); Houston, TX
02/23/2016; 6:00 pm, ESPN3		at UCF	L 62–65	5–22 (1–15)	CFE Arena (436); Orlando, FL
02/27/2016; 2:00 pm		at SMU	W 63–54	6–22 (2–15)	Moody Coliseum (914); Dallas, TX
02/29/2016; 7:00 pm		Memphis	L 64–77	6–23 (2–16)	Hofheinz Pavilion (336); Houston, TX
American Athletic Conference Women's Tournament
03/04/2016; 7:00 pm, ESPN3		vs. Tulsa; First Round	L 38–76	6–24	Mohegan Sun Arena (4,480); Uncasville, CT
*Non-conference game. ^{#}Rankings from AP Poll. (#) Tournament seedings in parentheses. All times are in Central Time.

== See also ==
- 2015–16 Houston Cougars men's basketball team
