= 2015–16 UCF Knights women's basketball team =

Intercollegiate basketball season

2015–16 UCF Knights women's basketball
- Conference: American Athletic Conference
- Record: 7–23 (4–14 The American)
- Head coach: Joi Williams (9th season)
- Assistant coaches: Ken Griffin; Tamisha Augustin; Joe Silvestri
- Home arena: CFE Arena

2015–16 American Athletic Conference women's basketball standings
	Conf.				Overall
Team	W		L	PCT	W		L	PCT
No. 1 UConn †	18	–	0	1.000	38	–	0	1.000
No. 21 South Florida	14	–	4	.778	24	–	10	.706
Temple	13	–	5	.722	23	–	12	.657
Memphis	12	–	6	.667	18	–	13	.581
Tulane	11	–	7	.611	23	–	12	.657
Tulsa	8	–	10	.444	12	–	19	.387
SMU	7	–	11	.389	13	–	18	.419
East Carolina	6	–	12	.333	13	–	19	.406
Cincinnati	4	–	14	.222	8	–	22	.267
UCF	4	–	14	.222	7	–	23	.233
Houston	2	–	16	.111	6	–	24	.200
† American Tournament winner As of April 5, 2016; Rankings from AP poll

The 2015–16 UCF Knights women's basketball team represented the University of Central Florida during the 2015–16 NCAA Division I basketball season. The Knights competed in Division I of the National Collegiate Athletic Association (NCAA) and the American Athletic Conference (The American). The Knights, in the program's 39th season of basketball, were led by ninth-year head coach Joi Williams, and played their home games at the CFE Arena on the university's main campus in Orlando, Florida. They finished the season 7–23, 4–14 in AAC play to finish in a tie for ninth place. They lost in the first round of the American Athletic women's tournament to SMU.

On March 7, 2016, following UCF's third consecutive first round loss in the conference tournament, Joi Williams was fired after serving as head coach for nine years. Williams finished her record at UCF, 114-163 overall and 59-91 in conference play.

== Media ==
All UCF games had an audio or video broadcast available. For conference play, UCF games were typically available on ESPN3, AAC Digital, or UCF Knights All-Access. Road games not on ESPN3 or AAC Digital had an audio broadcast available on the UCF portal. All non-conference home games were streamed exclusively on UCF Knights All-Access. Select non-conference road games had a stream available through the opponent's website. The audio broadcast for home games was only available through UCF Knights All-Access.

== Roster ==
2015–16 UCF Knights women's basketball team
Players
Coaches

Pos.	#	Name	Height	Year	Previous school	Hometown
G	4	Ashley Polacek	5 ft 5 in (1.65 m)	Fr	SPIRE Institute	Ottawa, ON
G	11	Kayla Thingpen	5 ft 8 in (1.73 m)	Fr	Palm Beach Lakes HS	West Palm Beach, FL
F	12	Nyala Shuler	6 ft 0 in (1.83 m)	RS Fr	Edgewater HS	Orlando, FL
C	13	Kayla Thomas	6 ft 5 in (1.96 m)	Fr	Mastery Charter HS	Philadelphia, PA
G	14	Erica Juarbe	5 ft 9 in (1.75 m)	Sr	Lincoln	Brooklyn, NY
F	21	Makenzi Reasor	6 ft 2 in (1.88 m)	RS So	Mount Vernon HS	Fortville, IN
G	22	Aliyah Gregory	5 ft 10 in (1.78 m)	So	Strawberry Crest	Tampa, FL
G	23	Zykira Lewis	5 ft 8 in (1.73 m)	Jr	Bartow HS	Bartow, FL
F	24	Fifi Ndour	6 ft 1 in (1.85 m)	So	Montverde Academy	Dakar, Senegal
F	25	Tolulope Omokore	5 ft 11 in (1.8 m)	Fr	Eleanor Roosevelt HS	Greenbelt, MD
F	32	Joslyn Massey	6 ft 0 in (1.83 m)	RS Jr	John Glenn HS	Detroit, MI
G	33	Jamesha Paul	5 ft 8 in (1.73 m)	Fr	Dillard HS	Pompano Beach, FL

Head coach

Joi Williams (South Florida)

Assistant coach(es)

Ken Griffin (Voorhees College)
Tamisha Augustin (Alabama A&M)
Joe Silvestri (Central Florida)

Legend

- (C) Team captain
- (S) Suspended
- (I) Ineligible
- (W) Walk-on
- Injured
- Current redshirt

Roster

== Schedule and results ==
Date time, TV	Rank^{#}	Opponent^{#}	Result	Record	Site (attendance) city, state
Non-conference regular season
11/14/2015*; 3:00 pm		at Nebraska–Omaha	L 60–75	0–1	Baxter Arena (846); Omaha, NE
11/17/2015*; 7:00 pm		FIU	W 89–72	1–1	CFE Arena (1,330); Orlando, FL
11/20/2015*; 7:00 pm		Florida A&M	W 93–55	2–1	CFE Arena (1,234); Orlando, FL
11/24/2015*; 8:00 pm		at South Alabama	W 77–36	3–1	Mitchell Center (347); Mobile, AL
11/28/2015*; 2:30 pm		Buffalo; UCF Thanksgiving Classic	L 60–66	3–2	CFE Arena (273); Orlando, FL
11/29/2015*; 2:30 pm		Butler; UCF Thanksgiving Classic	L 63–71	3–3	CFE Arena (309); Orlando, FL
12/02/2015*; 5:30 pm, ESPN3		at Stetson	L 68–83	3–4	Edmunds Center (415); DeLand, FL
12/05/2015*; 1:00 pm		at Akron	L 54–74	3–5	James A. Rhodes Arena (563); Akron, OH
12/13/2015*; 2:00 pm		St. John's	L 42–70	3–6	CFE Arena (1,328); Orlando, FL
12/22/2015*; 1:00 pm		Oklahoma State	L 55–74	3–7	CFE Arena (908); Orlando, FL
12/30/2015*; 7:00 pm, SECN		vs. Florida; AAC/SEC Challenge	L 79–93	3–8	Jacksonville Veterans Memorial Arena (2,044); Jacksonville, FL
AAC regular season
01/02/2016; 2:00 pm		Cincinnati	L 50–68	3–9 (0–1)	CFE Arena (356); Orlando, FL
01/05/2016; 7:00 pm		at No. 22 South Florida; War on I-4	L 63–108	3–10 (0–2)	USF Sun Dome (1,856); Tampa, FL
01/07/2016; 7:00 pm		East Carolina	L 56–71	3–11 (0–3)	CFE Arena (354); Orlando, FL
01/10/2016; 5:00 pm		at Tulane	L 54–75	3–12 (0–4)	Devlin Fieldhouse (994); New Orleans, LA
01/13/2016; 7:00 pm, ESPN3		Temple	L 63–71	3–13 (0–5)	CFE Arena (448); Orlando, FL
01/16/2016; 2:00 pm, ADN		at Cincinnati	W 80–60	4–13 (1–5)	Fifth Third Arena (451); Cincinnati, OH
01/20/2016; 7:00 pm, ESPN3/SNY		at No. 1 Connecticut	L 51–106	4–14 (1–6)	XL Center (8,523); Hartford, CT
01/24/2016; 2:00 pm, ESPNU		No. 15 South Florida; War on I-4	L 49–88	4–15 (1–7)	CFE Arena (958); Orlando, FL
01/27/2016; 8:00 pm, ADN		at Memphis	L 59–75	4–16 (1–8)	Elma Roane Fieldhouse (413); Memphis, TN
01/30/2016; 1:00 pm		Tulsa	W 75–74	5–16 (2–8)	CFE Arena (308); Orlando, FL
02/03/2016; 8:00 pm		at Houston	L 55–64	5–17 (2–9)	Hofheinz Pavilion (274); Houston, TX
02/06/2016; 3:00 pm, ADN		at SMU	L 50–65	5–18 (2–10)	Moody Coliseum (876); Dallas, TX
02/10/2016; 7:00 pm		Memphis	L 52–69	5–19 (2–11)	CFE Arena (538); Orlando, FL
02/13/2016; 3:00 pm		at Tulsa	L 71–95	5–20 (2–12)	Reynolds Center (273); Tulsa, OK
02/17/2016; 7:00 pm		Tulane	L 53–65	5–21 (2–13)	CFE Arena (472); Orlando, FL
02/20/2016; 2:00 pm, ADN		SMU	W 66–54	6–21 (3–13)	CFE Arena (833); Orlando, FL
02/23/2016; 7:00 pm, ESPN3		Houston	W 65–62	7–21 (4–13)	CFE Arena (436); Orlando, FL
02/29/2016; 7:00 pm, ADN		at Temple	L 64–78	7–22 (4–14)	McGonigle Hall (834); Philadelphia, PA
American Athletic Conference Women's Tournament
03/04/2016; 6:00 pm, ESPN3		vs. SMU; First Round	L 74–83 ^{OT}	7–23	Mohegan Sun Arena (4,480); Uncasville, CT
*Non-conference game. ^{#}Rankings from AP Poll. (#) Tournament seedings in parentheses. All times are in Eastern Time.

== See also ==
- 2015–16 UCF Knights men's basketball team
