= 2016 American Athletic Conference women's basketball tournament =

- Tournament Logo
- Classification: Division I
- Season: 2015–16
- Teams: 11
- Site: Mohegan Sun Arena; Uncasville, Connecticut
- Champions: Connecticut (3rd title)
- Winning coach: Geno Auriemma (3rd title)
- MVP: Breanna Stewart (Connecticut)
- Attendance: 30,478
- Television: ESPNU, ESPN2, ESPN3

2015–16 American Athletic Conference women's basketball standings
	Conf.				Overall
Team	W		L	PCT	W		L	PCT
No. 1 UConn †	18	–	0	1.000	38	–	0	1.000
No. 21 South Florida	14	–	4	.778	24	–	10	.706
Temple	13	–	5	.722	23	–	12	.657
Memphis	12	–	6	.667	18	–	13	.581
Tulane	11	–	7	.611	23	–	12	.657
Tulsa	8	–	10	.444	12	–	19	.387
SMU	7	–	11	.389	13	–	18	.419
East Carolina	6	–	12	.333	13	–	19	.406
Cincinnati	4	–	14	.222	8	–	22	.267
UCF	4	–	14	.222	7	–	23	.233
Houston	2	–	16	.111	6	–	24	.200
† American Tournament winner As of April 5, 2016; Rankings from AP poll

The 2016 American Athletic Conference women's basketball tournament was a tournament held March 4–7 in the Mohegan Sun Arena in Uncasville, Connecticut. Connecticut won their third straight American Athletic Conference title by defeating South Florida and earn an automatic trip to the NCAA women's basketball tournament.

== Seeds ==
All the teams in the American Athletic Conference qualified for the tournament. Teams were seeded based on conference record, and then a tiebreaker system was used. Teams seeded 6–11 played in the opening round, and teams seeded 1–5 received a bye to the quarterfinals.

Seed	School	Conference	Overall	Tiebreaker
1	Connecticut ‡	18–0	29–0	
2	South Florida #	14–4	21–8	
3	Temple #	13–5	19–10	
4	Memphis #	12–6	18–11	
5	Tulane #	11–7	20–10	
6	Tulsa	8–10	11–18	
7	SMU	7–11	12–17	
8	East Carolina	6–12	12–18	
9	Cincinnati	4–14	8–21	0–1 vs. Tulane
10	UCF	4–14	7–22	0–2 vs. Tulane
11	Houston	2–16	6–23	
‡ – American Athletic Conference regular season champions. # – Received a first-round bye in the conference tournament. Overall record are as of the end of the regular season.

== Schedule ==
All tournament games are nationally televised on an ESPN network:

Session	Game	Time*	Matchup^{#}	Television	Attendance
First round – Friday, March 4
1	1	4:00 PM	#8 East Carolina vs. #9 Cincinnati	ESPN3	4,480
1	2	6:00 PM	#7 SMU vs. #10 UCF	ESPN3	4,480
1	3	8:00 PM	#6 Tulsa vs. #11 Houston	ESPN3	4,480
Quarterfinals – Saturday, March 5
2	4	12:00 PM	#4 Memphis vs. #5 Tulane	ESPN3	7,033
2	5	2:00 PM	#1 Connecticut vs. #8 East Carolina	ESPN3	7,033
3	6	6:00 PM	#2 South Florida vs. #7 SMU	ESPN3	5,071
3	7	8:00 PM	#3 Temple vs. #6 Tulsa	ESPN3	5,071
Semifinals – Sunday, March 6
4	8	4:30 PM	#5 Tulane vs. #1 Connecticut	ESPNU	6,821
4	9	6:30 PM	#2 South Florida vs. #3 Temple	ESPNU	6,821
Championship Game – Monday, March 7
5	10	7:00 PM	#1 Connecticut vs. #2 South Florida	ESPN2	7,073
*Game Times in EST. #-Rankings denote tournament seeding.

== Bracket ==
First round Friday, March 4
8	East Carolina	70
9	Cincinnati	61
7	SMU	83*
10	UCF	74
6	Tulsa	76
11	Houston	38

Quarterfinals; Saturday, March 5
1	Connecticut	92
8	East Carolina	51
4	Memphis	64
5	Tulane	70
2	South Florida	73
7	SMU	60
3	Temple	78
6	Tulsa	52

Semifinals; Sunday, March 6
1	Connecticut	82
5	Tulane	35
2	South Florida	64
3	Temple	46

Championship game Monday, March 7
1	Connecticut	77
2	South Florida	51

Note: * denotes overtime

== See also ==
- 2016 American Athletic Conference men's basketball tournament
