= 2015–16 Memphis Tigers women's basketball team =

Intercollegiate basketball season

2015–16 Memphis Tigers women's basketball

WNIT, First Round
- Conference: American Athletic Conference
- Record: 18–13 (12–6 The American)
- Head coach: Melissa McFerrin (8th season)
- Assistant coaches: Darryl Brown; Erin Grant; Jessica Bogia
- Home arena: Elma Roane Fieldhouse

2015–16 American Athletic Conference women's basketball standings
	Conf.				Overall
Team	W		L	PCT	W		L	PCT
No. 1 UConn †	18	–	0	1.000	38	–	0	1.000
No. 21 South Florida	14	–	4	.778	24	–	10	.706
Temple	13	–	5	.722	23	–	12	.657
Memphis	12	–	6	.667	18	–	13	.581
Tulane	11	–	7	.611	23	–	12	.657
Tulsa	8	–	10	.444	12	–	19	.387
SMU	7	–	11	.389	13	–	18	.419
East Carolina	6	–	12	.333	13	–	19	.406
Cincinnati	4	–	14	.222	8	–	22	.267
UCF	4	–	14	.222	7	–	23	.233
Houston	2	–	16	.111	6	–	24	.200
† American Tournament winner As of April 5, 2016; Rankings from AP poll

The 2015–16 Memphis Tigers women's basketball team represented the University of Memphis during the 2015–16 NCAA Division I women's basketball season. The season marked the third for the Tigers as members of the American Athletic Conference. The Tigers, led by eighth year head coach Melissa McFerrin, played their home games at the Elma Roane Fieldhouse. They finished the season 18–13, 12–6 in AAC play to finish in fourth place. They lost in the quarterfinals of the American Athletic women's tournament, where they lost to Tulane. They were invited to the Women's National Invitation Tournament, where they lost to Tennessee–Martin in the first round.

== Media ==
All Tigers home games will have a radio broadcast live on WUMR. Video streaming for all home games will be available on the Memphis Tiger Network, ESPN3, or AAC Digital. Road games will typically be streamed on the opponents website, though conference road games could also appear on ESPN3 or AAC Digital.

== Roster ==
2015–16 Memphis Tigers women's basketball team
Players
Coaches

Pos.	#	Name	Height	Year	Previous school	Hometown
G	1	Breigha Wilder-Cochran	5 ft 9 in (1.75 m)	Jr	Hoover	Hoover, AL
G	2	Loysha Morris	5 ft 9 in (1.75 m)	Fr	Downsview; Garden City CC	Toronto, ON
G	3	Taylor Williams	6 ft 1 in (1.85 m)	Jr	Bishop Ward	Kansas City, KS
G	4	Ariel Hearn	5 ft 7 in (1.7 m)	Sr	Arlington	Memphis, TN
G	5	Brea Elmore	5 ft 9 in (1.75 m)	So	Redan	Stone Mountain, GA
F	10	Cheyenne Creighton	6 ft 1 in (1.85 m)	So	Blessed Pope John Paul II	Pickering, ON
G	11	Amber Holmes	5 ft 7 in (1.7 m)	So	Overton	Memphis, TN
F	21	Asianna Fuqua-Bey	6 ft 1 in (1.85 m)	Sr	Marist	Chicago, IL
G	22	Alexis Robinson	6 ft 1 in (1.85 m)	Jr	Westside HS; Hissborough CC	Macon, GA
G	24	Mooriah Rowser	5 ft 9 in (1.75 m)	RS Jr	St. John's College	Rockville, MD
C	25	Brianna Porter	6 ft 3 in (1.91 m)	Fr	University School of Nashville	Nashville, TN
F	33	Brianna Wright	6 ft 1 in (1.85 m)	Sr	Greenville-Weston; Chipola College	Greenville, MS
F	33	Ashia Jones (I) (redshirt)	6 ft 1 in (1.85 m)	Jr	Covington; Tennessee–Martin	Covington, TN
G	40	Damonique Miller	5 ft 11 in (1.8 m)	RS Fr	Joe T. Robinson	Little Rock, AR
F	44	Milena Bajic	6 ft 1 in (1.85 m)	Fr	None	Podgorica, Montenegro

Head coach

- Melissa McFerrin (Missouri)

Assistant coach(es)

- Darryl Brown (Temple)
- Erin Grant (Texas Tech)
- Jessica Bogia (Lafayette)

Legend

- (C) Team captain
- (S) Suspended
- (I) Ineligible
- (W) Walk-on
- Injured
- Current redshirt

Roster

== Schedule and results ==
Date time, TV	Rank^{#}	Opponent^{#}	Result	Record	Site (attendance) city, state
Exhibition
11/05/2015*; 7:00 pm		Harding	W 82–51		Elma Roane Fieldhouse; Memphis, TN
Non-conference regular season
11/13/2015*; 7:00 pm		Jacksonville State	W 70–55	1–0	Elma Roane Fieldhouse (757); Memphis, TN
11/15/2015*; 2:00 pm		Eastern Illinois	W 80–49	2–0	Elma Roane Fieldhouse (412); Memphis, TN
11/19/2015*; 7:00 pm, ESPN3		at Kansas	L 63–72	2–1	Allen Fieldhouse (1,823); Lawrence, KS
11/22/2015*; 2:00 pm		Georgetown	W 57–53	3–1	Elma Roane Fieldhouse (579); Memphis, TN
11/27/2015*; 5:15 pm		at Arkansas–Little Rock	L 53–61	3–2	Jack Stephens Center (972); Little Rock, AR
11/29/2015*; 2:00 pm		Southern Illinois	W 61–58	4–2	Elma Roane Fieldhouse (472); Memphis, TN
12/02/2015*; 7:00 pm		Saint Louis	L 57–63	4–3	Elma Roane Fieldhouse (588); Memphis, TN
12/06/2015*; 1:00 pm		George Washington	L 62–68	4–4	Elma Roane Fieldhouse (781); Memphis, TN
12/12/2015*; 2:00 pm		at Minnesota	L 60–70	4–5	Williams Arena (3,226); Minneapolis, MN
12/15/2015*; 11:00 am, ESPN3		at Central Michigan	W 64–61	5–5	McGuirk Arena (3,000); Mount Pleasant, MI
12/19/2015*; 2:00 pm		Illinois	W 81–75	6–5	Elma Roane Fieldhouse (593); Memphis, TN
AAC regular season
12/30/2015; 6:00 pm		at Temple	L 58–82	6–6 (0–1)	McGonigle Hall (1,177); Philadelphia, PA
01/03/2016; 4:00 pm, ESPNU		Tulane	W 83–67	7–6 (1–1)	Elma Roane Fieldhouse (631); Memphis, TN
01/05/2016; 5:00 pm		Houston	W 74–57	8–6 (2–1)	Elma Roane Fieldhouse (326); Memphis, TN
01/07/2016; 6:00 pm		at Cincinnati	W 64–47	9–6 (3–1)	Fifth Third Arena (373); Cincinnati, OH
01/10/2016; 1:00 pm, ADN		Tulsa	L 59–65	9–7 (3–2)	Elma Roane Fieldhouse (812); Memphis, TN
01/13/2016; 5:00 pm, ESPN3/SNY		No. 1 Connecticut	L 46–86	9–8 (3–3)	Elma Roane Fieldhouse (2,342); Memphis, TN
01/16/2016; 2:00 pm		at SMU	L 49–58	9–9 (3–4)	Moody Coliseum (743); Dallas, TX
01/20/2016; 7:00 pm, ADN		No. 15 South Florida	W 88–87 ^{OT}	10–9 (4–4)	Elma Roane Fieldhouse (684); Memphis, TN
01/23/2016; 2:00 pm		at Tulsa	W 69–58	11–9 (5–4)	Reynolds Center (332); Tulsa, OK
01/27/2016; 7:00 pm		UCF	W 75–59	12–9 (6–4)	Elma Roane Fieldhouse (413); Memphis, TN
01/30/2016; 11:00 am, ESPN3/SNY		at No. 1 Connecticut	L 40–83	12–10 (6–5)	XL Center (12,047); Hartford, CT
02/06/2016; 2:00 pm, ESPN3		Cincinnati	W 54–51	13–10 (7–5)	Elma Roane Fieldhouse (1,789); Memphis, TN
02/10/2016; 6:00 pm		at UCF	W 69–52	14–10 (8–5)	CFE Arena (538); Orlando, FL
02/13/2016; 4:00 pm, ESPN3		at East Carolina	W 79–78 ^{OT}	15–10 (9–5)	Williams Arena (2,169); Greenville, NC
02/18/2016; 7:00 pm, ADN		Temple	W 100–97 ^{5OT}	16–10 (10–5)	Elma Roane Fieldhouse (1,521); Memphis, TN
02/21/2016; 11:00 am, ESPNU		at No. 19 South Florida	L 82–97	16–11 (10–6)	USF Sun Dome (2,236); Tampa, FL
02/27/2016; 2:00 pm, ADN		East Carolina	W 93–83 ^{OT}	17–11 (11–6)	Elma Roane Fieldhouse (1,617); Memphis, TN
02/29/2016; 7:00 pm		at Houston	W 77–64	18–11 (12–6)	Hofheinz Pavilion (336); Houston, TX
American Athletic Conference Women's Tournament
03/05/2016; 11:00 am, ESPN3		vs. Tulane; Quarterfinals	L 64–70	18–12	Mohegan Sun Arena (7,033); Uncasville, CT
WNIT
03/17/2016*; 7:00 pm		Tennessee–Martin; First Round	L 73–79	18–13	Elma Roane Fieldhouse (1,253); Memphis, TN
*Non-conference game. ^{#}Rankings from AP Poll. (#) Tournament seedings in parentheses. All times are in Central Time.

== See also ==
- 2015–16 Memphis Tigers men's basketball team
