= Kim McNeill =

American basketball coach

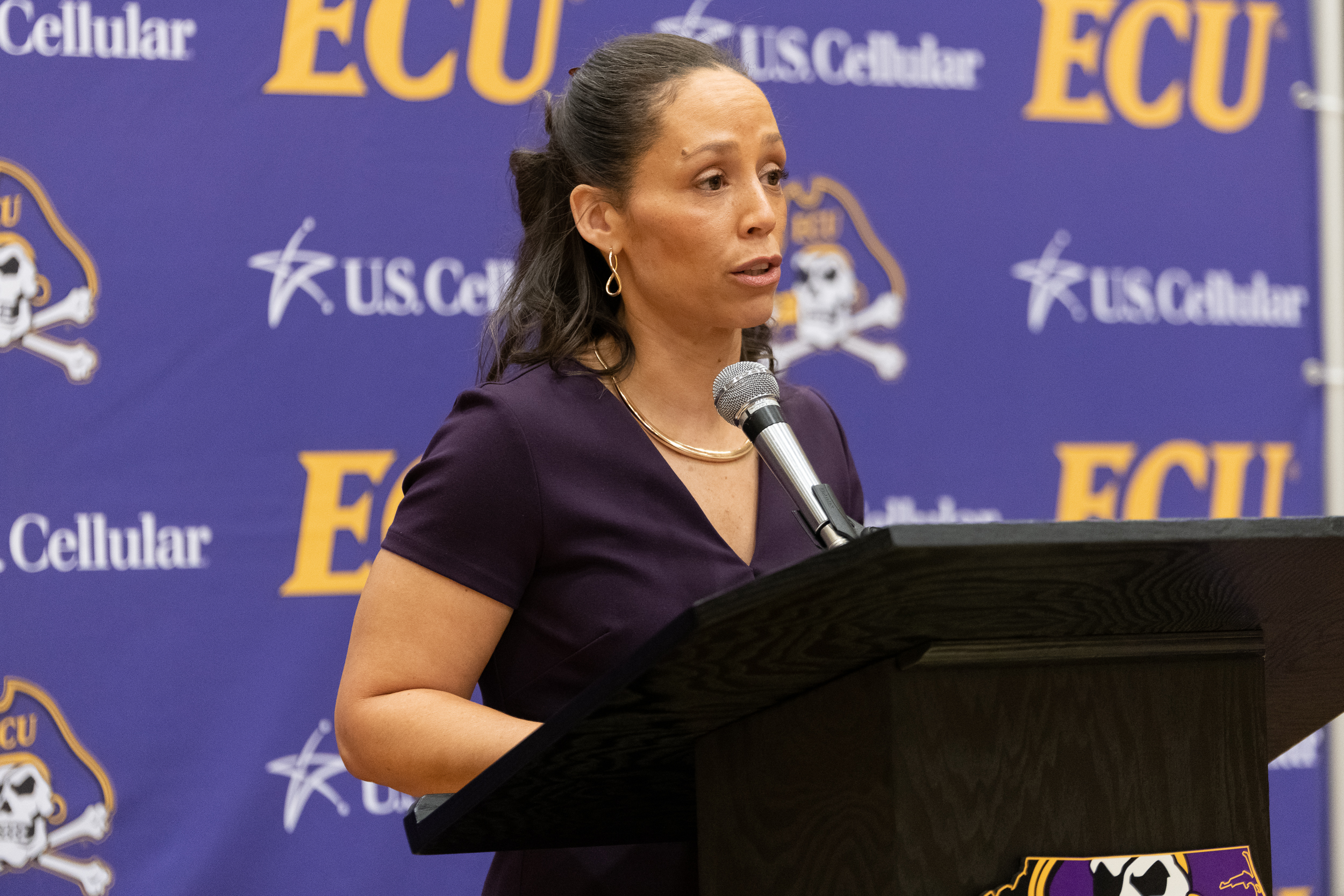

Current position
- Title: Head coach
- Team: East Carolina
- Conference: The American
- Record: 70–77 (.476)

Biographical details
- Born: June 20, 1978 (age 48)

Playing career
- 1996–1997: Radford
- 1997–2000: Richmond

Coaching career (HC unless noted)
- 2000–2001: James Madison (assistant)
- 2001–2002: Howard (assistant)
- 2002–2004: James Madison (assistant)
- 2004–2005: Richmond (assistant)
- 2005–2007: California (assistant)
- 2007–2011: Georgia (assistant)
- 2011–2013: Virginia (assistant)
- 2013–2016: Virginia (AHC)
- 2016–2019: Hartford
- 2019–present: East Carolina

Head coaching record
- Overall: 168–140 (.545)

Accomplishments and honors

Championships
- AAC Tournament (2023)

Awards
- AAC Coach of the Year (2023)

Kim McNeill (born June 20, 1978; née Hairston) is an American basketball coach from Bassett, Virginia. She is the current head coach for the East Carolina Pirates women's basketball team. Prior to becoming the head coach at East Carolina in 2019, she spent three seasons as the head women's basketball coach for the University of Hartford. Before taking over at Hartford she served as assistant and associate head coach at Virginia.

== Playing career ==
McNeill (at the time, Kim Hairston) began her collegiate playing career at Radford. As a freshman, she won the award as the Big South rookie of the year. She hit 45 out of 112 three point attempts for a 40.2% completion rate, which represented the second-highest figure and program history at that time. She then transferred to Richmond, where she was a co-captain of her team, and made the Colonial Athletic Association All-defensive team as a senior.

== Coaching career ==
McNeill worked as an assistant coach for three of her first four years after playing at James Madison. The one exception was a one-year stint at Howard. The last two years at James Madison she worked under Kenny Brooks, first when he was an associate head coach, and then when he was head coach.

She then returned to her alma mater, Richmond, in 2004, as an assistant coach, for a year. Joanne Boyle was the head coach of Richmond at the time. When Boyle accepted the head coaching position for California The following year, McNeill went with her to be an assistant on her staff.

After two years at California, during which the team went 41 – 21 over the two years and achieve the program's first winning seasons in 13 years, She took a position as an assistant coach with Hall of Fame coach Andy Landers at Georgia.

She spent four years at Georgia until Joanne Boyle took the head coaching position at Virginia and McNeill joined her as an assistant coach for two years and then was named associate head coach for three years. During her five years at Virginia the Cavaliers were 90–71, which included the first 25 win season in over a decade and three WNIT appearances.

=== Hartford ===
McNeill took to step up to head-coaching when Jennifer Rizzotti left Hartford after 17 years as head coach. In her first year, she led the Hawks to a 17–14 season. All 59 wins at the University of Hartford were vacated by the NCAA.

==== 2017–18 ====
In her second season at Hartford she led the Hawks to the America East Championship game falling to Maine 74-65.

==== 2018–19 ====
In her final season as head coach she led Hartford to a second-place finish in the America East and an invitation to the WNIT in 2019, losing to Providence in the first round 71–54.

=== East Carolina ===
In March 2019, East Carolina persuaded McNeill to take over as head coach.

== Head coaching record ==
Record table
Season	Team	Overall	Conference	Standing	Postseason
Hartford Hawks (America East Conference) (2016–2019)
2016–17	Hartford	0 –14 *17 wins vacated by NCAA	7–9	6th	
2017–18	Hartford	0–13 *19 wins vacated by NCAA	9–7	6th	
2018–19	Hartford	0–11 *23 wins vacated by NCAA	14–2	2nd	WNIT First Round
Hartford:		59–38 (.608)	30–18 (.625)		
East Carolina Pirates (American Athletic Conference) (2019–present)
2019–20	East Carolina	9–21	6–10	9th	
2020–21	East Carolina	8–14	6–10	6th	
2021–22	East Carolina	11–18	4–11	10th	
2022–23	East Carolina	23–10	11–5	3rd	NCAA Division I First Round
2023–24	East Carolina	19–14	9–9	T–6th	
2024–25	East Carolina	17–15	8–10	7th	
2025–26	East Carolina	22–10	14–4	2nd	
East Carolina:		109–102 (.517)	58–59 (.496)		
Total:		168–140 (.545)			
National champion Postseason invitational champion Conference regular season champion Conference regular season and conference tournament champion Division regular season champion Division regular season and conference tournament champion Conference tournament champion
