= 2015–16 Temple Owls women's basketball team =

Intercollegiate basketball season

2015–16 Temple Owls women's basketball

WNIT, Quarterfinals
- Conference: American Athletic Conference
- Record: 23–12 (13–5 The American)
- Head coach: Tonya Cardoza (8th season)
- Assistant coaches: Way Veney; Meg Barber; Willnett Crockett
- Home arena: Liacouras Center; McGonigle Hall

2015–16 American Athletic Conference women's basketball standings
| | Conf. | | | | Overall |
| Team | W | | L | PCT | W | | L | PCT |
|---|---|---|---|---|---|---|---|---|
| No. 1 UConn † | 18 | – | 0 | 1.000 | 38 | – | 0 | 1.000 |
| No. 21 South Florida | 14 | – | 4 | .778 | 24 | – | 10 | .706 |
| Temple | 13 | – | 5 | .722 | 23 | – | 12 | .657 |
| Memphis | 12 | – | 6 | .667 | 18 | – | 13 | .581 |
| Tulane | 11 | – | 7 | .611 | 23 | – | 12 | .657 |
| Tulsa | 8 | – | 10 | .444 | 12 | – | 19 | .387 |
| SMU | 7 | – | 11 | .389 | 13 | – | 18 | .419 |
| East Carolina | 6 | – | 12 | .333 | 13 | – | 19 | .406 |
| Cincinnati | 4 | – | 14 | .222 | 8 | – | 22 | .267 |
| UCF | 4 | – | 14 | .222 | 7 | – | 23 | .233 |
| Houston | 2 | – | 16 | .111 | 6 | – | 24 | .200 |
† American Tournament winner As of April 5, 2016; Rankings from AP poll

The 2015–16 Temple Owls women's basketball team represented Temple University during the 2015–16 NCAA Division I women's basketball season. The season marked the third for the Owls as members of the American Athletic Conference. The Owls, led by eighth year head coach Tonya Cardoza, played their home games at McGonigle Hall with four games at the Liacouras Center.

The team finished the season 23–12, 13–5 in AAC play to finish in third place. They advanced to the semifinals of the American Athletic women's tournament, where they lost to South Florida. They were invited to the Women's National Invitation Tournament, where they defeated Drexel, Quinnipiac and Ohio in the first, second and third rounds before losing to Michigan in the quarterfinals.

== Media ==
All Owls home games have video streaming on Owls TV, ESPN3, or AAC Digital. Road games are typically streamed on the opponent's website, though conference road games may also appear on ESPN3 or AAC Digital. There are no radio broadcasts for Owls women's basketball games. Audio of most games is available through the opponent's website.

== Roster ==
2015–16 Temple Owls women's basketball team
Players
Coaches

| Pos. | # | Name | Height | Year | Previous school | Hometown |
|---|---|---|---|---|---|---|
| G | 0 | Alliya Butts | 5 ft 4 in (1.63 m) | So | Holy Cross | Edgewater Park, NJ |
| G | 1 | Erica Covile | 6 ft 1 in (1.85 m) | Sr | John Glenn | Detroit, MI |
| G | 2 | Feyonda Fitzgerald | 5 ft 7 in (1.7 m) | Jr | Lake Taylor | Norfolk, VA |
| C | 5 | Ugo Nwaigwe | 6 ft 3 in (1.91 m) | GS | Valley Stream; Wagner | Valley Stream, NY |
| F | 12 | Ruth Sherrill | 6 ft 0 in (1.83 m) | Sr | Thomas Edison; Hofstra | Alexandria, VA |
| G | 21 | Khadijah Berger | 5 ft 10 in (1.78 m) | So | Hampton | Hampton, VA |
| G | 22 | Tanaya Atkinson | 5 ft 9 in (1.75 m) | So | Hill Regional Career | New Haven, CT |
| G | 23 | Deja Reynolds | 5 ft 9 in (1.75 m) | Fr | Riverdale Baptist | Philadelphia, PA |
| F | 31 | Chyanna Canada | 6 ft 2 in (1.88 m) | Fr | William Nottingham | Syracuse, NY |
| G | 32 | Donnaizha Fountain | 6 ft 0 in (1.83 m) | RS Jr | Cambridge Rindge & Latin; Georgia Tech | Roxbury, MA |
| F | 33 | Monasia Bolduc | 6 ft 1 in (1.85 m) | Jr | Nazareth Academy; Walters State | Clintondale, NY |
| C | 35 | Safiya Martin | 6 ft 4 in (1.93 m) | Jr | Sandy Creek | Fayetteville, GA |
| C | 42 | Taylor Robinson | 6 ft 4 in (1.93 m) | Jr | Ladue Horton Watkins | St. Louis, MO |

Head coach

- Tonya Cardoza (Virginia)

Assistant coach(es)

- Way Veney (College of Charleston)
- Meg Barber (NYU)
- Willnett Crockett (Connecticut)

Legend

- (C) Team captain
- (S) Suspended
- (I) Ineligible
- (W) Walk-on
- Injured
- Current redshirt

Roster

== Schedule and results ==
| Date time, TV | Rank^{#} | Opponent^{#} | Result | Record | Site (attendance) city, state |
Exhibition
| 11/07/2015*; 2:00 pm | | Bloomfield | W 65–42 | | McGonigle Hall; Philadelphia, PA |
Regular season
| 11/13/2015*; 7:00 pm | | Florida | W 97–91 | 1–0 | Liacouras Center (1,453); Philadelphia, PA |
| 11/18/2015*; 7:00 pm | | at La Salle | W 77–48 | 2–0 | Tom Gola Arena (419); Philadelphia, PA |
| 11/22/2015*; 2:00 pm | | at Rutgers | L 51–61 | 2–1 | Louis Brown Athletic Center (1,725); Piscataway, NJ |
| 11/24/2015*; 5:00 pm | | at Quinnipiac | L 56–58 | 2–2 | TD Bank Sports Center (494); Hamden, CT |
| 11/29/2015*; 2:00 pm | | Saint Joseph's | L 67–70 | 2–3 | McGonigle Hall (928); Philadelphia, PA |
| 12/02/2015*; 5:00 pm | | Villanova | W 61–55 | 3–3 | McGonigle Hall (725); Philadelphia, PA |
| 12/06/2015*; 2:00 pm, ESPN3 | | at No. 13 Florida State | L 47–75 | 3–4 | Donald L. Tucker Civic Center (2,784); Tallahassee, FL |
| 12/09/2015*; 7:00 pm | | Sacred Heart | W 92–62 | 4–4 | McGonigle Hall (633); Philadelphia, PA |
| 12/12/2015*; 12:00 pm | | at Fordham | W 57–44 | 5–4 | Rose Hill Gymnasium (452); Bronx, NY |
| 12/19/2015*; 1:00 pm | | Delaware State | W 100–59 | 6–4 | Liacouras Center (4,578); Philadelphia, PA |
| 12/30/2015; 7:00 pm | | Memphis | W 82–58 | 7–4 (1–0) | McGonigle Hall (1,177); Philadelphia, PA |
| 01/02/2016; 3:00 pm | | at Houston | W 75–66 | 8–4 (2–0) | Hofheinz Pavilion (1,308); Houston, TX |
| 01/05/2016; 8:00 pm | | at SMU | L 67–69 | 8–5 (2–1) | Moody Coliseum (514); Dallas, TX |
| 01/08/2016; 5:00 pm, ESPNU | | Tulsa | W 66–46 | 9–5 (3–1) | McGonigle Hall (748); Philadelphia, PA |
| 01/10/2016; 2:00 pm, ESPN3 | | Cincinnati | W 74–51 | 10–5 (4–1) | McGonigle Hall (915); Philadelphia, PA |
| 01/13/2016; 2:00 pm | | UCF | W 71–63 | 11–5 (5–1) | CFE Arena (448); Orlando, FL |
| 01/16/2016; 6:00 pm, CBSSN | | at No. 1 Connecticut | L 49–104 | 11–6 (5–2) | Gampel Pavilion (9,846); Storrs, CT |
| 01/21/2016*; 7:00 pm | | Penn | L 54–60 | 11–7 | McGonigle Hall (1,003); Philadelphia, PA |
| 01/26/2016; 8:00 pm, ADN | | at Tulane | W 72–54 | 12–7 (6–2) | Devlin Fieldhouse (992); New Orleans, LA |
| 01/30/2016; 2:30 pm, ESPN3 | | at East Carolina | W 83–63 | 13–7 (7–2) | Williams Arena (1,699); Greenville, NC |
| 02/03/2016; 12:00 pm, ADN | | SMU | W 55–35 | 14–7 (8–2) | Liacouras Center (2,846); Philadelphia, PA |
| 02/06/2016; 2:00 pm, ESPN3 | | No. 19 South Florida | W 68–66 | 15–7 (9–2) | Liacouras Center (1,320); Philadelphia, PA |
| 02/09/2016; 7:00 pm, ADN | | Cincinnati | W 74–49 | 16–7 (10–2) | Fifth Third Arena (329); Cincinnati, OH |
| 02/12/2016; 7:00 pm, ESPN3 | | Houston | W 78–48 | 17–7 (11–2) | McGonigle Hall (1,298); Philadelphia, PA |
| 02/14/2016; 4:00 pm, ESPN2 | | No. 1 Connecticut | L 60–85 | 17–8 (11–3) | McGonigle Hall (3,392); Philadelphia, PA |
| 02/18/2015; 8:00 pm, ADN | | at Memphis | L 97–100 ^{5OT} | 17–9 (11–4) | Elma Roane Fieldhouse (1,521); Memphis, TN |
| 02/23/2016; 7:00 pm | | Tulane | W 72–67 | 18–9 (12–4) | McGonigle Hall (1,074); Philadelphia, PA |
| 02/27/2016; 2:00 pm, ESPN3 | | at No. 21 South Florida | L 62–76 | 18–10 (12–5) | USF Sun Dome (2,446); Tampa, FL |
| 02/29/2016; 7:00 pm, ADN | | UCF | W 78–64 | 19–10 (13–5) | McGonigle Hall (834); Philadelphia, PA |
American Athletic Conference Women's Tournament
| 03/05/2016; 8:00 pm, ESPN3 | | vs. Tulsa; Quarterfinals | W 78–52 | 20–10 | Mohegan Sun Arena (5,071); Uncasville, CT |
| 03/06/2016; 7:30 pm, ESPNU | | vs. No. 20 South Florida; Semifinals | L 46–64 | 20–11 | Mohegan Sun Arena (6,821); Uncasville, CT |
WNIT
| 03/18/2016*; 7:00 pm | | at Drexel; First Round | W 74–66 | 21–11 | Daskalakis Athletic Center (641); Philadelphia, PA |
| 03/20/2016*; 2:00 pm | | at Quinnipiac; Second Round | W 64–62 | 22–11 | TD Bank Sports Center (338); Hamden, CT |
| 03/24/2016*; 7:00 pm | | Ohio; Third Round | W 75–61 | 23–11 | McGonigle Hall (570); Philadelphia, PA |
| 03/28/2016*; 7:00 pm | | at Michigan; Quarterfinals | L 76–77 | 23–12 | Crisler Center (1,457); Ann Arbor, MI |
*Non-conference game. ^{#}Rankings from AP Poll. (#) Tournament seedings in parentheses. All times are in Eastern Time.

== See also ==
- 2015–16 Temple Owls men's basketball team
- Temple Owls women's basketball
