= 2015–16 Tulsa Golden Hurricane women's basketball team =

Intercollegiate basketball season

2015–16 Tulsa Golden Hurricane women's basketball
- Conference: American Athletic Conference
- Record: 12–19 (8–10 The American)
- Head coach: Matilda Mossman (5th season)
- Assistant coaches: Shane Coffey; Megan Robbins; Leah Foster
- Home arena: Reynolds Center

2015–16 American Athletic Conference women's basketball standings
	Conf.				Overall
Team	W		L	PCT	W		L	PCT
No. 1 UConn †	18	–	0	1.000	38	–	0	1.000
No. 21 South Florida	14	–	4	.778	24	–	10	.706
Temple	13	–	5	.722	23	–	12	.657
Memphis	12	–	6	.667	18	–	13	.581
Tulane	11	–	7	.611	23	–	12	.657
Tulsa	8	–	10	.444	12	–	19	.387
SMU	7	–	11	.389	13	–	18	.419
East Carolina	6	–	12	.333	13	–	19	.406
Cincinnati	4	–	14	.222	8	–	22	.267
UCF	4	–	14	.222	7	–	23	.233
Houston	2	–	16	.111	6	–	24	.200
† American Tournament winner As of April 5, 2016; Rankings from AP poll

The 2015–16 Tulsa Golden Hurricane women's basketball team represented the University of Tulsa during the 2015–16 NCAA Division I women's basketball season. The season marked the second season for the Golden Hurricane as members of the American Athletic Conference. The Golden Hurricane, led by fifth year head coach Matilda Mossman, played their home games at the Reynolds Center. They finished the season 12–19, 8–10 AAC play to finish in sixth place. They advanced to the quarterfinals of the American Athletic women's tournament, where they lost to Temple.

== Media ==
All Golden Hurricane games will be broadcast on KTGX CHROME 95.3 FM and KWTU 88.7 FM HD3. The audio broadcast can also be heard on Hurricane Vision. A video stream for all home games will be on Hurricane Vision, ESPN3, or AAC Digital. Road games will typically be streamed on the opponents website, though conference road games could also appear on ESPN3 or AAC Digital.

== Roster ==
2015–16 Tulsa Golden Hurricane women's basketball team
Players
Coaches

Pos.	#	Name	Height	Year	Previous school	Hometown
G	00	Kelsee Grovey	5 ft 8 in (1.73 m)	Sr	Shawnee	Shawnee, OK
G	1	Jordyn Holmes	5 ft 11 in (1.8 m)	So	Crockett	Austin, TX
G	2	Tatyana Perez	5 ft 6 in (1.68 m)	Fr	Cypress Woods	Cypress, TX
G	3	Erika Wakefield	5 ft 4 in (1.63 m)	So	Heritage Hall	Moore, OK
G	4	Teanna Reid	5 ft 6 in (1.68 m)	Jr	Millwood; Butler CC	Oklahoma City, OK
G	13	Ashley Hughes	5 ft 7 in (1.7 m)	Jr	Sulphur	Sulphur, OK
G	15	Antoinet Webster	5 ft 9 in (1.75 m)	RS Sr	Western Heights	Oklahoma City, OK
F	21	Te'era Williams	5 ft 11 in (1.8 m)	RS Jr	Douglass; Butler CC	Oklahoma City, OK
F	22	Jessica Pongonis (I) (redshirt)	6 ft 1 in (1.85 m)	Jr	Hamilton Southeastern; Saint Joseph's	Fishers, IN
G	23	Ashley Clark	5 ft 11 in (1.8 m)	Sr	Midwest City	Midwest City, OK
F	25	Tyjae' Scales	6 ft 1 in (1.85 m)	Fr	Kinkaid	Houston, TX
F	33	Crystal Polk	6 ft 2 in (1.88 m)	Fr	Lawton Ike	Lawton, OK
F	35	Liesl Spoerl	6 ft 1 in (1.85 m)	RS So	Cascia Hall	Tulsa, OK

Head coach

- Matilda Mossman (Western Kentucky)

Assistant coach(es)

- Shane Coffey (Oklahoma State)
- Megan Robbins (Oklahoma State)
- Leah Foster (St. Edward's)

Legend

- (C) Team captain
- (S) Suspended
- (I) Ineligible
- (W) Walk-on
- Injured
- Current redshirt

Roster

== Schedule and results ==
Date time, TV	Rank^{#}	Opponent^{#}	Result	Record	Site (attendance) city, state
Exhibition
10/30/2015*; 7:00 pm		Rogers State	W 85–51		Reynolds Center; Tulsa, OK
11/06/2015*; 7:00 pm		Southeastern Oklahoma State	W 92–50		Reynolds Center; Tulsa, OK
Non-conference regular season
11/13/2015*; 7:00 pm		Kansas State	L 67–75	0–1	Reynolds Center (1,433); Tulsa, OK
11/17/2015*; 7:00 pm		at Saint Louis	L 73–82	0–2	Chaifetz Arena (225); St. Louis, MO
11/20/2015*; 7:00 pm		Oral Roberts; PSO Mayor's Cup	L 53–59	0–3	Reynolds Center (1,171); Tulsa, OK
11/23/2015*; 7:00 pm		at Arkansas	W 74–67	1–3	Bud Walton Arena (1,653); Fayetteville, AR
11/28/2015*; 4:30 pm		vs. Drake; UNLV Lady Rebel Round-Up semifinals	L 80–91	1–4	Cox Pavilion (840); Paradise, NV
11/29/2015*; 2:00 pm		vs. George Mason; UNLV Lady Rebel Round-Up 3rd place game	L 63–64	1–5	Cox Pavilion; Paradise, NV
12/02/2015*; 7:00 pm		Grambling State	W 79–51	2–5	Reynolds Center (302); Tulsa, OK
12/06/2015*; 1:00 pm		Indiana State	L 63–67	2–6	Reynolds Center (351); Tulsa, OK
12/09/2015*; 7:00 pm		No. 17 Oklahoma	L 62–75	2–7	Reynolds Center (1,770); Tulsa, OK
12/13/2015*; 2:00 pm		at Arkansas–Little Rock	W 74–63	3–7	Jack Stephens Center (1,087); Little Rock, AR
12/20/2015*; 1:00 pm		at Northern Iowa	L 59–75	3–8	McLeod Center (1,341); Cedar Falls, IA
AAC regular season
12/30/2015; 7:00 pm, ESPN3		East Carolina	W 81–79 ^{OT}	4–8 (1–0)	Reynolds Center (337); Tulsa, OK
01/02/2016; 2:00 pm, ADN		SMU	W 56–54	5–8 (2–0)	Reynolds Center (346); Tulsa, OK
01/06/2016; 6:00 pm, ESPN3/SNY		at No. 1 Connecticut	L 35–85	5–9 (2–1)	XL Center (8,515); Hartford, CT
01/08/2016; 4:00 pm, ESPNU		at Temple	L 46–66	5–10 (2–2)	McGonigle Hall (748); Philadelphia, PA
01/10/2016; 1:00 pm, ADN		at Memphis	W 65–59	6–10 (3–2)	Elma Roane Fieldhouse (812); Memphis, TN
01/13/2016; 7:00 pm, ADN		Cincinnati	L 53–55	6–11 (3–3)	Reynolds Center (363); Tulsa, OK
01/16/2016; 1:00 pm, ADN		Tulane	L 47–71	6–12 (3–4)	Reynolds Center (377); Tulsa, OK
01/20/2016; 7:00 pm		at Houston	W 79–62	7–12 (4–4)	Hofheinz Pavilion (154); Houston, TX
01/23/2016; 2:00 pm		Memphis	L 58–69	7–13 (4–5)	Reynolds Center (332); Tulsa, OK
01/27/2016; 7:00 pm, ESPN3/SNY		No. 1 Connecticut	L 30–94	7–14 (4–6)	Reynolds Center (2,091); Tulsa, OK
01/30/2016; 12:00 pm		at UCF	L 74–75	7–15 (4–7)	CFE Arena (308); Orlando, FL
02/03/2016; 6:00 pm, ESPN3		at East Carolina	W 55–54	8–15 (5–7)	Williams Arena (1,432); Greenville, NC
02/10/2016; 7:00 pm		Houston	W 44–28	9–15 (6–7)	Reynolds Center (467); Tulsa, OK
02/13/2016; 2:00 pm		UCF	W 95–71	10–15 (7–7)	Reynolds Center (273); Tulsa, OK
02/17/2016; 7:00 pm, ESPN3		at SMU	L 45–62	10–16 (7–8)	Moody Coliseum (923); Dallas, TX
02/20/2016; 1:00 pm, ADN		at Tulane	L 42–61	10–17 (7–9)	Devlin Fieldhouse (1,436); New Orleans, LA
02/24/2016; 7:00 pm, ADN		No. 21 South Florida	L 66–72	10–18 (7–10)	Reynolds Center (337); Tulsa, OK
02/27/2016; 12:00 pm		at Cincinnati	W 76–63	11–18 (8–10)	Fifth Third Arena (553); Cincinnati, OH
American Athletic Conference Women's Tournament
03/04/2016; 7:00 pm, ESPN3		vs. Houston; First Round	W 76–38	12–18	Mohegan Sun Arena (4,480); Uncasville, CT
03/05/2016; 7:00 pm, ESPN3		vs. Temple; Quarterfinals	L 52–78	12–19	Mohegan Sun Arena (5,071); Uncasville, CT
*Non-conference game. ^{#}Rankings from AP Poll. (#) Tournament seedings in parentheses. All times are in Central Time.

== See also ==
- 2015–16 Tulsa Golden Hurricane men's basketball team
