= 2015–16 Cincinnati Bearcats women's basketball team =

Intercollegiate basketball season

2015–16 Cincinnati Bearcats women's basketball
- Conference: American Athletic Conference
- Record: 8–22 (4–14 The American)
- Head coach: Jamelle Elliott (7th season)
- Assistant coaches: Tasha Brown; Katie Rokus; Aaron Swinson
- Home arena: Fifth Third Arena

2015–16 American Athletic Conference women's basketball standings
	Conf.				Overall
Team	W		L	PCT	W		L	PCT
No. 1 UConn †	18	–	0	1.000	38	–	0	1.000
No. 21 South Florida	14	–	4	.778	24	–	10	.706
Temple	13	–	5	.722	23	–	12	.657
Memphis	12	–	6	.667	18	–	13	.581
Tulane	11	–	7	.611	23	–	12	.657
Tulsa	8	–	10	.444	12	–	19	.387
SMU	7	–	11	.389	13	–	18	.419
East Carolina	6	–	12	.333	13	–	19	.406
Cincinnati	4	–	14	.222	8	–	22	.267
UCF	4	–	14	.222	7	–	23	.233
Houston	2	–	16	.111	6	–	24	.200
† American Tournament winner As of April 5, 2016; Rankings from AP poll

The 2015–16 Cincinnati Bearcats women's basketball team represented the University of Cincinnati during the 2015–16 NCAA Division I women's basketball season. The season marked the third for the Bearcats as members of the American Athletic Conference. The Bearcats, led by seventh year head coach Jamelle Elliott, played their home games at Fifth Third Arena. They finished the season 8–22, 4–14 in AAC play to finish in a tie for ninth place. They lost in the first round of the American Athletic women's tournament to East Carolina.

== Media ==
All Bearscats games will have an audio broadcast streamed on Bearcats TV. Before conference season home games will also have a video stream on Bearcats TV. Conference home games will rotate between ESPN3, AAC Digital, Fox Sports Ohio, and Bearcats TV. Road games will typically be streamed on the opponents website, though conference road games could also appear on ESPN3 or AAC Digital.

== Roster ==
2015–16 Cincinnati Bearcats women's basketball team
Players
Coaches

Pos.	#	Name	Height	Year	Previous school	Hometown
G	2	Nikira Goings	5 ft 9 in (1.75 m)	Fr	Osborne	Marietta, GA
G	3	Ana Owens	5 ft 6 in (1.68 m)	So	Lawrence North	Indianapolis, IN
G	12	Alyesha Lovett	6 ft 0 in (1.83 m)	RS Sr	Malcolm X Shabazz	Newark, NJ
G	13	Brandey Tarver	5 ft 10 in (1.78 m)	So	Bogan Computer Technical	Chicago, IL
F	14	Trinity Hunter	6 ft 1 in (1.85 m)	So	Gahanna Lincoln	New Albany, OH
G	20	Maya Benham	6 ft 0 in (1.83 m)	Fr	Osborne	Doulgasville, GA
F	21	Brianna Moore	6 ft 1 in (1.85 m)	So	Luella	Locust Grove, GA
G	22	Bianca Quisenberry	5 ft 8 in (1.73 m)	Jr	Tecumseh	Springfield, OH
G	23	Jasmine Whitfield	5 ft 10 in (1.78 m)	Sr	South Oldham	Crestwood, KY
F	25	Chelsea Warren	6 ft 1 in (1.85 m)	Fr	Red Oak	Red Oak, TX
F	32	Shelbi Chandler	6 ft 3 in (1.91 m)	Sr	Pike	Indianapolis, IN
F	50	Shaqeia Stokes	6 ft 1 in (1.85 m)	GS	Winton Woods; Saint Francis (PA)	Cincinnati, OH

Head coach

Jamelle Elliott (Connecticut)

Assistant coach(es)

Tasha Brown (St. Ambrose)
Katie Rokus (South Carolina-Aiken)
Aaron Swinson (Auburn)

Legend

- (C) Team captain
- (S) Suspended
- (I) Ineligible
- (W) Walk-on
- Injured
- Current redshirt

Roster

== Schedule and results ==
Date time, TV	Rank^{#}	Opponent^{#}	Result	Record	Site (attendance) city, state
Exhibition
11/07/2015*; 3:00 pm		Southern Indiana	W 69–46		Fifth Third Arena (419); Cincinnati, OH
Non-conference regular season
11/14/2015*; 1:00 pm		Saint Francis (PA)	W 93–86	1–0	Fifth Third Arena (460); Cincinnati, OH
11/18/2015*; 7:00 pm		Northern Kentucky	W 71–68	2–0	Fifth Third Arena (395); Cincinnati, OH
11/21/2015*; 7:00 pm		Bowling Green	W 54–51	3–0	Fifth Third Arena (963); Cincinnati, OH
11/26/2015*; 2:00 pm		vs. No. 5 Baylor; Junkanoo Jam Lucaya Division	L 34–72	3–1	St. George HS Gymnasium (353); Freeport, BAH
11/27/2015*; 5:45 pm		vs. No. 20 Michigan State; Junkanoo Jam Lucaya Division	L 63–103	3–2	St. George HS Gymnasium (328); Freeport, BAH
12/02/2015*; 7:00 pm		at Detroit	L 68–77	3–3	Calihan Hall (197); Detroit, MI
12/06/2015*; 1:00 pm, CBSSN		No. 10 Ohio State	L 76–105	3–4	Fifth Third Arena (1,767); Cincinnati, OH
12/13/2015*; 5:00 pm		at Xavier	L 56–65	3–5	Cintas Center (1,863); Cincinnati, OH
12/18/2015*; 7:00 pm		Tennessee–Martin	L 57–63	3–6	Fifth Third Arena (377); Cincinnati, OH
12/20/2015*; 2:00 pm		Eastern Illinois	W 70–57	4–6	Fifth Third Arena (302); Cincinnati, OH
12/23/2015*; 1:00 pm		at Georgia	L 42–60	4–7	Stegeman Coliseum (2,350); Athens, GA
AAC regular season
12/30/2015; 7:00 pm, ESPN3/SNY		No. 1 Connecticut	L 45–107	4–8 (0–1)	Fifth Third Arena (2,246); Cincinnati, OH
01/02/2016; 2:00 pm		at UCF	W 68–50	5–8 (1–1)	CFE Arena (356); Orlando, FL
01/07/2016; 7:00 pm		Memphis	L 47–64	5–9 (1–2)	Fifth Third Arena (373); Cincinnati, OH
01/10/2016; 2:00 pm, ESPN3		at Temple	L 51–74	5–10 (1–3)	McGonigle Hall (915); Philadelphia, PA
01/13/2016; 8:00 pm, ADN		at Tulsa	W 55–53	6–10 (2–3)	Reynolds Center (363); Tulsa, OK
01/16/2016; 2:00 pm, ADN		UCF	L 60–80	6–11 (2–4)	Fifth Third Arena (451); Cincinnati, OH
01/20/2016; 7:00 pm		at East Carolina	L 60–63	6–12 (2–5)	Williams Arena (1,198); Greenville, NC
01/27/2016; 7:00 pm		SMU	L 55–73	6–13 (2–6)	Fifth Third Arena (318); Cincinnati, OH
01/30/2016; 2:00 pm		Houston	W 56–50	7–13 (3–6)	Fifth Third Arena (456); Cincinnati, OH
02/03/2016; 7:00 pm		at No. 19 South Florida	L 49–82	7–14 (3–7)	USF Sun Dome (2,007); Tampa, FL
02/06/2016; 3:00 pm, ESPN3		at Memphis	L 51–54	7–15 (3–8)	Elma Roane Fieldhouse (1,789); Memphis, TN
02/09/2016; 7:00 pm, ADN		Temple	L 49–74	7–16 (3–9)	Fifth Third Arena (329); Cincinnati, OH
02/12/2016; 7:00 pm, ADN		No. 22 South Florida	L 51–78	7–17 (3–10)	Fifth Third Arena (323); Cincinnati, OH
02/17/2015; 7:00 pm, ESPN3/SNY		at No. 1 Connecticut	L 34–88	7–18 (3–11)	Gampel Pavilion (8,461); Storrs, CT
02/20/2016; 2:00 pm		at Houston	W 67–61	8–18 (4–11)	Hofheinz Pavilion (363); Houston, TX
02/24/2016; 7:00 pm		East Carolina	L 55–77	8–19 (4–12)	Fifth Third Arena (458); Cincinnati, OH
02/27/2016; 1:00 pm		Tulsa	L 63–76	8–20 (4–13)	Fifth Third Arena (553); Cincinnati, OH
02/29/2016; 8:00 pm, ESPN3		at Tulane	L 51–70	8–21 (4–14)	Devlin Fieldhouse (1,428); New Orleans, LA
American Athletic Conference Women's Tournament
03/04/2016; 4:00 pm, ESPN3		vs. East Carolina; First Round	L 61–70	8–22	Mohegan Sun Arena (4,480); Uncasville, CT
*Non-conference game. ^{#}Rankings from AP Poll. (#) Tournament seedings in parentheses. All times are in EST.

== See also ==
- 2015–16 Cincinnati Bearcats men's basketball team
