= 2015–16 SMU Mustangs women's basketball team =

Intercollegiate basketball season

2015–16 SMU Mustangs women's basketball

SMU Thanksgiving Classic Champions
- Conference: American Athletic Conference
- Record: 13–18 (7–11 The American)
- Head coach: Rhonda Rompola (25th season)
- Assistant coaches: Lisa Dark; Deneen Parker; Danny Hughes
- Home arena: Moody Coliseum

2015–16 American Athletic Conference women's basketball standings
	Conf.				Overall
Team	W		L	PCT	W		L	PCT
No. 1 UConn †	18	–	0	1.000	38	–	0	1.000
No. 21 South Florida	14	–	4	.778	24	–	10	.706
Temple	13	–	5	.722	23	–	12	.657
Memphis	12	–	6	.667	18	–	13	.581
Tulane	11	–	7	.611	23	–	12	.657
Tulsa	8	–	10	.444	12	–	19	.387
SMU	7	–	11	.389	13	–	18	.419
East Carolina	6	–	12	.333	13	–	19	.406
Cincinnati	4	–	14	.222	8	–	22	.267
UCF	4	–	14	.222	7	–	23	.233
Houston	2	–	16	.111	6	–	24	.200
† American Tournament winner As of April 5, 2016; Rankings from AP poll

The 2015–16 SMU Mustangs women's basketball team represented Southern Methodist University in the 2015–16 NCAA Division I women's basketball season. The Mustangs played their home games at Moody Coliseum. The 2015–16 season was the third season the Mustangs will participate in the American Athletic Conference. The Mustangs, led by twenty-fifth year head coach Rhonda Rompola, finished the season 13–18, 7–11 in AAC play to finish in seventh place. They advanced to the quarterfinals of the American Athletic women's tournament, where they lost to South Florida.

On February 22, Coach Rompola announced she will be retiring at the end of the season. She finished at SMU with a 25-year record of 438–314.

== Media ==
All Pony Express games will air on KAAM. Before conference season home games will be streamed on Pony Up TV. Conference home games will rotate between ESPN3, AAC Digital, and Pony Up TV. Road games will typically be streamed on the opponents website, though conference road games could also appear on ESPN3 or AAC Digital.

== Roster ==
2015–16 SMU Mustangs women's basketball team
Players
Coaches

Pos.	#	Name	Height	Year	Previous school	Hometown
G	0	Kiara Perry	5 ft 10 in (1.78 m)	Jr	Duncanville	Duncanville, TX
G	2	McKenzie Adams	5 ft 9 in (1.75 m)	RS So	Frisco Centennial; Arkansas	Frisco, TX
G	3	Gabrielle Wilkins	5 ft 9 in (1.75 m)	Sr	Garland	Garland, TX
G	4	Mikayla Reese	5 ft 8 in (1.73 m)	So	Sand Creek	Colorado Springs, CO
G	5	Aurmani DeGar	5 ft 8 in (1.73 m)	So	Mansfield Timberview	Arlington, TX
F	10	Alicia Froling	6 ft 3 in (1.91 m)	So	Australia Institute of Sport	Queensland, Australia
F	11	Keely Froling	6 ft 2 in (1.88 m)	So	Australia Institute of Sport	Queensland, Australia
G	12	Morgan Bolton	5 ft 6 in (1.68 m)	RS Jr	Duncanville; Arkansas–Little Rock	Duncanville, TX
C	13	Klara Bradshaw (I) (redshirt)	6 ft 6 in (1.98 m)	Jr	Rains; TCU	Emory, TX
G	14	Karlie Cronin	5 ft 9 in (1.75 m)	Fr	Oakton	Vienna, VA
F	15	Stephanie Collins	6 ft 5 in (1.96 m)	So	Australia Institute of Sport	Melbourne, Australia
F	20	Dai'ja Thomas	6 ft 2 in (1.88 m)	Fr	Skyline	Dallas, TX
G	24	Kamray Mickens	5 ft 8 in (1.73 m)	Jr	Carroll Southlake; Trinity Valley	Westlake, TX
G	33	Ashley Gibson	5 ft 10 in (1.78 m)	Jr	Deer Creek; Butler	Edmond, OK

Head coach

Rhonda Rompola (SMU)

Assistant coach(es)

Lisa Dark (SMU)
Deneen Parker (Stephen F. Austin)
Danny Hughes (TCU)

Legend

- (C) Team captain
- (S) Suspended
- (I) Ineligible
- (W) Walk-on
- Injured
- Current redshirt

Roster

== Schedule and results ==
Date time, TV	Rank^{#}	Opponent^{#}	Result	Record	Site (attendance) city, state
Non-conference regular season
11/15/2015*; 5:00 pm		Northwestern State	W 74–36	1–0	Moody Coliseum (715); Dallas, TX
11/18/2015*; 7:00 pm		TCU	L 79–89	1–1	Moody Coliseum (745); Dallas, TX
11/21/2015*; 1:00 pm		No. 18 Arizona State	L 57–64	1–2	Moody Coliseum (302); Dallas, TX
11/27/2015*; 5:30 pm		Cal State Fullerton; SMU Thanksgiving Classic semifinals	W 74–53	2–2	Moody Coliseum; Dallas, TX
11/28/2015*; 5:00 pm		Kansas; SMU Thanksgiving Classic championship	W 73–64	3–2	Moody Coliseum (782); Dallas, TX
12/01/2015*; 7:00 pm		at North Texas	L 57–60	3–3	The Super Pit (819); Denton, TX
12/05/2015*; 5:00 pm		New Mexico	L 58–63	3–4	Moody Coliseum (979); Dallas, TX
12/07/2015*; 11:00 am, SECN		at No. 15 Texas A&M	L 55–67	3–5	Reed Arena (8,004); College Station, TX
12/19/2015*; 12:15 pm		vs. Arizona; Puerto Rico Classic	W 58–46	4–5	Coliseo Rubén Zayas Montañez; Trujillo Alto, PR
12/20/2015*; 2:30 pm		vs. Gardner–Webb; Puerto Rico Classic	W 69–61	5–5	Coliseo Rubén Zayas Montañez; Trujillo Alto, PR
12/21/2015*; 12:15 pm		vs. No. 8 Mississippi State; Puerto Rico Classic	L 70–72	5–6	Coliseo Rubén Zayas Montañez; Trujillo Alto, PR
AAC regular season
01/02/2016; 2:00 pm, ADN		at Tulsa	L 54–56	5–7 (0–1)	Reynolds Center (346); Tulsa, OK
01/05/2016; 7:00 pm		Temple	W 69–67	6–7 (1–1)	Moody Coliseum (514); Dallas, TX
01/07/2016; 6:00 pm, ADN		at No. 22 South Florida	L 56–83	6–8 (1–2)	USF Sun Dome (1,756); Tampa, FL
01/10/2016; 2:00 pm		at Houston	W 50–48	7–8 (2–2)	Hofheinz Pavilion (878); Houston, TX
01/16/2016; 2:00 pm		Memphis	W 58–49	8–8 (3–2)	Moody Coliseum (743); Dallas, TX
01/20/2016; 7:00 pm, ESPN3		Tulane	L 42–54	8–9 (3–3)	Moody Coliseum (612); Dallas, TX
01/23/2016; 2:00 pm, ESPN3/SNY		No. 1 Connecticut	L 37–90	8–10 (3–4)	Moody Coliseum (3,732); Dallas, TX
01/27/2016; 6:00 pm		at Cincinnati	W 73–55	9–10 (4–4)	Fifth Third Arena (318); Cincinnati, OH
01/31/2016; 1:00 pm, ESPNU		No. 20 South Florida	L 48–66	9–11 (4–5)	Moody Coliseum (982); Dallas, TX
02/03/2016; 11:00 am, ADN		at Temple	L 35–55	9–12 (4–6)	Liacouras Center (2,846); Philadelphia, PA
02/06/2016; 2:00 pm, ADN		UCF	W 65–50	10–12 (5–6)	Moody Coliseum (876); Dallas, TX
02/09/2016; 7:00 pm		East Carolina	W 72–66 ^{OT}	11–12 (6–6)	Moody Coliseum (636); Dallas, TX
02/14/2016; 2:00 pm, ADN		at Tulane	L 64–76	11–13 (6–7)	Devlin Fieldhouse (1,159); New Orleans, LA
02/17/2016; 2:00 pm, ESPN3		Tulsa	W 62–45	12–13 (7–7)	Moody Coliseum (923); Dallas, TX
02/20/2016; 2:00 pm		at UCF	L 54–66	12–14 (7–8)	CFE Arena (833); Orlando, FL
02/24/2016; 6:00 pm, ESPN3/SNY		at No. 1 Connecticut	L 41–88	12–15 (7–9)	Gampel Pavilion (7,505); Storrs, CT
02/27/2016; 2:00 pm		Houston	L 54–63	12–16 (7–10)	Moody Coliseum (914); Dallas, TX
02/29/2016; 6:00 pm		at East Carolina	L 61–78	12–17 (7–11)	Williams Arena (1,190); Greenville, NC
American Athletic Conference Women's Tournament
03/04/2016; 5:00 pm, ESPN3		vs. UCF; First Round	W 83–74 ^{OT}	13–17	Mohegan Sun Arena (4,480); Uncasville, CT
03/05/2016; 5:00 pm, ESPN3		vs. No. 20 South Florida; Quarterfinals	L 60–73	13–18	Mohegan Sun Arena; Uncasville, CT
*Non-conference game. ^{#}Rankings from AP Poll. (#) Tournament seedings in parentheses. All times are in Central Time.

== See also ==
- 2015–16 SMU Mustangs men's basketball team
