= Freedom High School (Tampa, Florida) =

Public high school in Tampa, Florida, United States

Coordinates: 28.133608°N 82.385445°W

Location
- 17410 Commerce Park Blvd; Tampa, Florida 33647; United States

Information
- Type: Public high school
- Motto: Home of the Patriots
- Established: 2002
- School district: Hillsborough County Public Schools
- Principal: Kevin Stephenson
- Teaching staff: 85.00 (FTE)
- Grades: 9–12
- Enrollment: 1,871 (2023–2024)
- Student to teacher ratio: 22.01
- Colors: Red, white, and blue
- Mascot: Patriots
- Rival: Wharton
- Newspaper: Revolution
- Yearbook: Glory
- Website: www.hillsboroughschools.org/o/freedom

Freedom High School is a public high school located in the New Tampa region of Tampa, Florida, United States. It operates as a part of the Hillsborough County Public Schools district and serves students in grades 9–12. Freedom High School was named in honor of those who lost their lives on September 11, 2001.

== Media ==
- Newspaper: Revolution
- Website: HillsboroughSchools.org/o/Freedom
- Yearbook: Glory
- Media Specialist: Jennifer Simard

TV Production: Freedom TV

== Languages and language programs ==
- Bilingual: E.S.O.L.
- Foreign Language: Spanish and French

== Clubs ==
- Aerospace Club
- Book Club
- Drama
- Environmental Club
- FBLA
- FFA
- French Honor Society
- Gay/Straight Alliance
- Interact Club
- Key Club
- Latino Dance Club
- Model UN
- Mu Alpha Theta
- National Art Society
- National Honor Society
- Rho Kappa
- NJROTC
- Science National Honor Society
- Scrubs Club
- S-H-E Club
- Spanish Honor Society
- Spirit Club
- Tri-M Music Honor Society

== Sports ==
Fall sports

- Cross Country (B/G)
- Football (B)
- Golf (B/G)
- Swimming/Diving (B/G)
- Volleyball (G)

Winter sports

- Basketball (B/G)
- Ice Hockey (B/G)
- Soccer (B/G)
- Wrestling (B)
- Competitive Cheerleading (G)

Spring sports

- Baseball (B)
- Lacrosse (B/G)
- Flag Football (G)
- Softball (G)
- Tennis (B/G)
- Track and Field (B/G)
- FHS Athletic Director: Jeffery Duncan

== School ranking ==
History of school ranking
School Year	Grade
2017-2018	C
2016-2017	C
2015-2016	C
2014-2015	B
2013-2014	B
2012-2013	B
2011-2012	B
2010-2011	B
2009-2010	B
2008-2009	C
2007-2008	A
2006-2007	B
2005-2006	B
2004-2005	B
2003-2004	B

== Leadership ==
In June 2008, principal Richard Bartels retired. Mr. Bartels was the first principal of Freedom High School and helped to open the school in 2002.

Kevin Stephenson actively serves as the current school principal since the 2014–2015 school year.
