= East Carolina Pirates women's basketball =

2026–27 East Carolina Pirates women's basketball team
- University: East Carolina University
- First season: 1969
- Head coach: Kim McNeill (8th season)
- Location: Greenville, North Carolina
- Arena: Williams Arena at Minges Coliseum (capacity: 8,000)
- Conference: The American
- Nickname: Pirates
- Colors: Purple and gold
- All-time record: – (–)

NCAA Division I tournament appearances
- 1982, 2007, 2023

AIAW tournament appearances
- 1973

Conference tournament champions
- CAA: 1984, 1985; C-USA: 2007; AAC: 2023

Uniforms
Home	Away

The East Carolina Pirates women's basketball is the team that represents East Carolina University in women's basketball. The school competes in the American Conference in Division I of the National Collegiate Athletic Association (NCAA). The Pirates play home basketball games at the Williams Arena at Minges Coliseum at Greenville, North Carolina.

== Season-by-season record ==
They have won three conference tournaments (1984, 1985, 2007, and 2023) while going to the NCAA Tournament in 1982, 2007, and 2023.

Season	Record	Conference record	Postseason result	Coach
1969–70	9–2	No Conference	n/a	Catherine Bolton
1970–71	11–1	No Conference	n/a	Catherine Bolton
1971–72	12–3	No Conference	n/a	Catherine Bolton
1972–73	19–2	No Conference	AIAW Top 12	Catherine Bolton
1973–74	8–5	No Conference	n/a	Catherine Bolton
1974–75	13–10	No Conference	n/a	Catherine Bolton
1975–76	12–6	No Conference	n/a	Catherine Bolton
1976–77	7–15	No Conference	n/a	Catherine Bolton
1977–78	19–11	No Conference	n/a	Catherine Bolton
1978–79	18–11	No Conference	n/a	Cathy Andruzzi
1979–80	21–10	No Conference	n/a	Cathy Andruzzi
1980–81	22–7	No Conference	n/a	Cathy Andruzzi
1981–82	17–10	No Conference	NCAA first round	Cathy Andruzzi
1982–83	14–12	No Conference	n/a	Cathy Andruzzi
1983–84	13–16	3–2 (ECAC-South)	CAA Tournament Champions	Cathy Andruzzi
1984–85	20–9	11–1 (ECAC-South)	CAA Tournament Champions	Emily Manwaring
1985–86	24–6	11–1 (Colonial)	CAA Finalist	Emily Manwaring
1986–87	16–13	7–5 (Colonial)	n/a	Emily Manwaring
1987–88	8–20	2–10 (Colonial	n/a	Pat Pierson
1988–89	15–13	7–5 (Colonial)	n/a	Pat Pierson
1989–90	18–10	8–4 (Colonial)	n/a	Pat Pierson
1990–91	12–17	4–8 (Colonial)	CAA Finalist	Pat Pierson
1991–92	21–8	12–2 (Colonial)	CAA Finalist	Pat Pierson
1992–93	16–12	8–8 (Colonial)	n/a	Rosie Thompson
1993–94	2–24	1–13 (Colonial)	n/a	Rosie Thompson
1994–95	8–19	3–11 (Colonial)	n/a	Rosie Thompson
1995–96	11–16	6–10 (Colonial)	n/a	Anne Donovan
1996–97	13–16	6–10 (Colonial)	CAA Finalist	Anne Donovan
1997–98	9–19	4–12 (Colonial)	n/a	Anne Donovan
1998–99	16–13	7–9 (Colonial)	CAA Finalist	Dee Stokes
1999-00	15–14	9–7 (Colonial)	n/a	Dee Stokes
2000–01	16–12	10–6 (Colonial)	n/a	Dee Stokes
2001–02	6–21	3–11 (C-USA)	n/a	Dee Stokes/Gene Hill
2002–03	12–16	4–10 (C-USA)	n/a	Sharon Baldwin-Tener
2003–04	14–14	5–9 (C-USA)	n/a	Sharon Baldwin-Tener
2004–05	10–18	6–8 (C-USA)	n/a	Sharon Baldwin-Tener
2005–06	17–12	8–8 (C-USA)	n/a	Sharon Baldwin-Tener
2006–07	19–14	11–5 (C-USA)	C-USA Champions; NCAA First Round	Sharon Baldwin-Tener
2007–08	13–17	7–9 (C-USA)	n/a	Sharon Baldwin-Tener
2008–09	18–13	8–8 (C-USA)	n/a	Sharon Baldwin-Tener
2009–10	23–11	9–7 (C-USA)	WNIT Second Round	Sharon Baldwin-Tener
2010–11	16–15	9–7 (C-USA)	n/a	Heather Macy
2011–12	12–19	5–11 (C-USA)	n/a	Heather Macy
2012–13	22–10	11–5 (C-USA)	WNIT First Round	Heather Macy
2013–14	22–9	10–6 (C-USA)	WNIT First Round	Heather Macy
2014–15	22–11	11–7 (AAC)	WNIT Second Round	Heather Macy
2015–16	13–19	6–12 (AAC)	n/a	Heather Macy
2016–17	11–19	2–14 (AAC)	n/a	Heather Macy
2017–18	16–15	7–9 (AAC)	n/a	Heather Macy
2018–19	16–15	6–10 (AAC)	n/a	Chad killinger/Nicole Mealing
2019–20	9–21	6–10 (AAC)	n/a	Kim McNeill
2020–21	8–14	6–10 (AAC)	n/a	Kim McNeill
2021–22	11–18	4–14 (AAC)	n/a	Kim McNeill
2022–23	23–9	11–5 (AAC)	NCAA First Round	Kim McNeill

== Postseason results ==
=== NCAA Division I ===
Year	Seed	Round	Opponent	Result
1982	6	Round of 32	(3) South Carolina	L 54–79
2007	13	Round of 64	(4) Rutgers	L 34–77
2023	(13 S4)	Round of 64	4 S4 Texas	L 40–79

=== AIAW Division I ===
The Pirates made one appearance in the AIAW National Division I basketball tournament, with a combined record of 1–2.

Year	Round	Opponent	Result
1973	First Round; Consolation First Round; Consolation Second Round	Western Washington; Indiana State; Kansas State	L 51–55; W 60–48; L 46–47
