= 2023 American Athletic Conference women's basketball tournament =

U.S. college basketball tournament

- Classification: Division I
- Season: 2022–23
- Teams: 11
- Site: Dickies Arena; Fort Worth, Texas
- Champions: East Carolina (1st title)
- Winning coach: Kim McNeill (1st title)
- MVP: Synia Johnson (East Carolina)
- Television: ESPN+, ESPNU

2022–23 American Athletic Conference women's basketball standings
	Conf.				Overall
Team	W		L	PCT	W		L	PCT
South Florida	15	–	1	.938	27	–	7	.794
Memphis	11	–	4	.733	22	–	11	.667
East Carolina †	11	–	5	.688	23	–	9	.719
Houston	10	–	5	.667	15	–	16	.484
SMU	7	–	8	.467	17	–	12	.586
Tulane	7	–	9	.438	18	–	14	.563
Tulsa	7	–	9	.438	17	–	13	.567
Wichita State	6	–	10	.375	18	–	15	.545
Temple	6	–	10	.375	11	–	18	.379
UCF	4	–	11	.267	14	–	15	.483
Cincinnati	2	–	14	.125	9	–	21	.300
† 2023 AAC tournament winner As of March 24, 2023; Rankings from AP poll Source: The American

The 2023 American Athletic Conference women's basketball tournament was held March 6–9, 2023, at Dickies Arena in Fort Worth, Texas. All games of the tournament were televised by ESPN Inc. The winner of the tournament will receive the conference's automatic bid to the 2023 NCAA tournament. East Carolina won the tournament and received the AAC automatic bid to the 2023 NCAA tournament.

== Seeds ==
Teams were seeded by conference record. The top five teams received byes to the quarterfinals.

Tiebreakers were applied as needed to properly seed the teams.

Seed	School	Conference Record	Tiebreaker
1	South Florida	15–1	
2	Memphis	11–4	
3	East Carolina	11–5	
4	Houston	10–5	
5	SMU	7–8	
6	Tulane	7–9	2–0 vs. Tulsa
7	Tulsa	7–9	0–2 vs. Tulane
8	Wichita State	6–10	2–0 vs. Cincinnati
9	Temple	6–10	1–1 vs. Cincinnati
10	UCF	4–11	
11	Cincinnati	2–14	

== Schedule ==
Game	Time	Matchup	Score	Television
First Round – March 6, 2023
1	1:00 PM	No. 8 Wichita State vs. No. 9 Temple	71–61	ESPN+
2	3:00 PM	No. 7 Tulsa vs. No. 10 UCF	53–69	ESPN+
3	5:00 PM	No. 6 Tulane vs. No. 11 Cincinnati	61-52	ESPN+
Quarterfinals – March 7, 2023
4	12:00 PM	No. 1 South Florida vs. No. 8 Wichita State	53-65	ESPN+
5	2:00 PM	No. 4 Houston vs. No. 5 SMU	52-33	ESPN+
6	6:00 PM	No. 2 Memphis vs. No. 10 UCF	48-46	ESPN+
7	8:00 PM	No. 3 East Carolina vs. No. 6 Tulane	69-58	ESPN+
Semifinals – March 8, 2023
8	4:00 PM	No. 8 Wichita State vs. No. 4 Houston	62-74	ESPN+
9	6:00 PM	No. 2 Memphis vs. No. 3 East Carolina	60-69	ESPN+
Championship – March 9, 2023
10	8:00 PM	No. 4 Houston vs. No. 3 East Carolina	44-46	ESPNU
Game Times in CT. Rankings denote tournament seed.

== Bracket ==
* – Denotes overtime period

First round Monday, March 6
8	Wichita State	71
9	Temple	61
7	Tulsa	53
10	UCF	69
6	Tulane	61
11	Cincinnati	52

Quarterfinals; Tuesday, March 7
1	South Florida	53
8	Wichita State	65
4	Houston	52
5	SMU	33
2	Memphis	48
10	UCF	46
3	East Carolina	69
6	Tulane	58

Semifinals; Wednesday, March 8
8	Wichita State	62
4	Houston	74
2	Memphis	60
3	East Carolina	69

Championship; Thursday, March 9
4	Houston	44
3	East Carolina	46

== See also ==
- 2023 American Athletic Conference men's basketball tournament
- American Athletic Conference women's basketball tournament
- American Athletic Conference
