= 2022–23 Tulane Green Wave women's basketball team =

American college basketball season

2022–23 Tulane Green Wave women's basketball

WNIT, first round
- Conference: American Athletic Conference
- Record: 18–14 (7–9 The American)
- Head coach: Lisa Stockton (29th season)
- Assistant coaches: Alan Frey; Chandra Dorsey; Olivia Grayson
- Home arena: Devlin Fieldhouse

2022–23 American Athletic Conference women's basketball standings
	Conf.				Overall
Team	W		L	PCT	W		L	PCT
South Florida	15	–	1	.938	27	–	7	.794
Memphis	11	–	4	.733	22	–	11	.667
East Carolina †	11	–	5	.688	23	–	9	.719
Houston	10	–	5	.667	15	–	16	.484
SMU	7	–	8	.467	17	–	12	.586
Tulane	7	–	9	.438	18	–	14	.563
Tulsa	7	–	9	.438	17	–	13	.567
Wichita State	6	–	10	.375	18	–	15	.545
Temple	6	–	10	.375	11	–	18	.379
UCF	4	–	11	.267	14	–	15	.483
Cincinnati	2	–	14	.125	9	–	21	.300
† 2023 AAC tournament winner As of March 24, 2023; Rankings from AP poll Source: The American

The 2022–23 Tulane Green Wave women's basketball team represented Tulane University during the 2022–23 NCAA Division I women's basketball season. The Green Wave, led by 29th-year head coach Lisa Stockton, played their home games at Devlin Fieldhouse in New Orleans, Louisiana and were ninth-year members of the American Athletic Conference (AAC).

The Green Wave finished the season 18–14, 7–9 in AAC play, to finish in a tie for sixth place. As the #6 seed in the AAC tournament, they defeated #11 seed Cincinnati in the first round before falling to #3 seed and eventual tournament champions East Carolina in the quarterfinals. They received an at-large bid into the WNIT, where they lost to Auburn in the first round.

== Previous season ==
The Green Wave finished the 2021–22 season 21–10, 11–5 in AAC play, to finish in third place. They lost in the quarterfinals of the AAC tournament to Houston. They received at-large bid to the WNIT, where they defeated Jacksonville State in the first round before losing to Alabama in the second round.

== Offseason ==
=== Departures ===
Due to COVID-19 disruptions throughout NCAA sports in 2020–21, the NCAA announced that the 2020–21 season would not count against the athletic eligibility of any individual involved in an NCAA winter sport, including women's basketball. This meant that all seniors in 2020–21 had the option to return for 2021–22.

Name	Number	Pos.	Height	Year	Hometown	Reason for departure
Arsula Clark	0	G	5' 9"	(redshirt) Senior	Miami, FL	Graduated
Moon Ursin	11	G	5' 6"	(redshirt) Senior	Destrehan, LA	Graduated
Sierra Cheatham	12	G	6' 0"	(redshirt) Senior	Houston, TX	Graduated
Krystal Freeman	23	F	6' 0"	(redshirt) Senior	Pineville, LA	Graduated
Dene' Mimms	30	F	6' 5"	(redshirt) Sophomore	New Orleans, LA	
Mia Heide	42	F	6' 3"	(redshirt) Junior	Austin, TX	Graduate transferred to Duke

=== Incoming transfers ===
Name	Number	Pos.	Height	Year	Hometown	Previous school
Kyren Whittington	0	G	5' 9"	(redshirt) Freshman	Folsom, LA	Louisiana–Monroe
Rachel Hakes	11	G	6' 0"	GS senior	Woodbury, MN	Fairfield

==== Recruiting ====
There was no recruiting class of 2022.

== Media ==
All Green Wave games were broadcast on WRBH 88.3 FM. A video stream for all home games was available on Tulane All-Access, ESPN3, or AAC Digital. Road games were typically streamed on the opponent's website, though conference road games also appeared on ESPN3 or AAC Digital.

== Roster ==
2022–23 Tulane Green Wave women's basketball team
Players
Coaches

Pos.	#	Name	Height	Year	Previous school	Hometown
G	0	Kyren Whittington	5 ft 9 in (1.75 m)	RS So	Northlake Christian School; Louisiana–Monroe	Folsom, LA
G	2	Kierra Middleton	5 ft 7 in (1.7 m)	So	Midlothian	Arlington, TX
G	3	Marta Galic	6 ft 0 in (1.83 m)	GS	Sportska Gimnazija; San Francisco	Zagreb, Croatia
G	5	Jaylee Womack	5 ft 0 in (1.52 m)	RS Fr	Ponchatoula	Springfield, LA
G	11	Rachel Hakes	6 ft 0 in (1.83 m)	GS	Woodbury; Fairfield	Woodbury, MN
G	12	Kahia Warmsley	5 ft 8 in (1.73 m)	RS So	Mansfield; Southern Miss	Shreveport, LA
G	14	Dynah Jones	5 ft 9 in (1.75 m)	GS	John Curtis	New Orleans, LA
F	15	Anijah Grant	6 ft 3 in (1.91 m)	RS Jr	Oak Ridge	Orlando, FL
F	21	Irina Parau	6 ft 1 in (1.85 m)	RS Jr	Nicolae Balcescu	Cluj-Napoca, Romania
F	22	McKenzi Carter	6 ft 1 in (1.85 m)	RS So	Fort Worth Country Day	Fort Worth, TX
F	23	Amira Mabry	6 ft 0 in (1.83 m)	Fr	Judson	Converse, TX
G	24	Chiara Gratini	5 ft 7 in (1.7 m)	RS So	IIS Giordano Bruno	Turin, Italy

Head coach

- Lisa Stockton (Wake Forest)

Assistant coach(es)

- Alan Frey (LSU New Orleans)
- Chandra Dorsey (Mississippi)
- Olivia Grayson (Tulane)

Legend

- (C) Team captain
- (S) Suspended
- (I) Ineligible
- (W) Walk-on
- Injured
- Current redshirt

Roster
Last update: March 26, 2024

== Schedule and results ==
Date time, TV	Rank^{#}	Opponent^{#}	Result	Record	Site (attendance) city, state
Exhibition
November 1, 2022*; 6:00 p.m.		Loyola (New Orleans)	W 88–53		Devlin Fieldhouse (487); New Orleans, LA
Non-conference regular season
November 7, 2022*; 4:00 p.m., ESPN+		Grambling State	W 72–46	1–0	Devlin Fieldhouse (885); New Orleans, LA
November 10, 2022*; 6:00 p.m., ESPN+		Alabama	L 61–72	1–1	Devlin Fieldhouse (494); New Orleans, LA
November 17, 2022*; 7:00 p.m., ESPN+		at South Alabama	W 79–46	2–1	Mitchell Center (284); Mobile, AL
November 20, 2022*; 6:00 p.m., ESPN+		Sam Houston	W 90–51	3–1	Devlin Fieldhouse; New Orleans, LA
November 24, 2022*; 8:00 p.m.		vs. Northern Iowa; Cancún Challenge	L 60–82	3–2	Hard Rock Hotel Riviera Maya (89); Puerto Aventuras, Mexico
November 25, 2022*; 8:00 p.m.		vs. Central Michigan; Cancún Challenge	W 78–66	4–2	Hard Rock Hotel Riviera Maya (107); Puerto Aventuras, Mexico
November 30, 2022*; 6:00 p.m., ESPN+		New Orleans	W 90–37	5–2	Devlin Fieldhouse (445); New Orleans, LA
December 4, 2022*; 4:00 p.m., ESPN+		No. 11 LSU	L 72–85	5–3	Devlin Fieldhouse (1,592); New Orleans, LA
December 7, 2022*; 6:00 p.m., ESPN+		at Troy	W 103–100 ^{2OT}	6–3	Trojan Arena (2,137); Troy, AL
December 11, 2022*; 2:00 p.m., ESPN+		Southern	W 67–52	7–3	Devlin Fieldhouse (1,055); New Orleans, LA
December 20, 2022*; 12:00 p.m., ESPN+		Saint Francis (PA); Tulane Holiday Tournament	W 84–41	8–3	Devlin Fieldhouse (533); New Orleans, LA
December 21, 2022*; 12:30 p.m., ESPN+		Tennessee Tech; Tulane Holiday Tournament	W 71–49	9–3	Devlin Fieldhouse (615); New Orleans, LA
December 28, 2022*; 6:00 p.m., ESPN+		Tougaloo	W 81–30	10–3	Devlin Fieldhouse (402); New Orleans, LA
AAC regular season
December 30, 2022; 6:00 p.m., ESPN+		South Florida	L 61–69	10–4 (0–1)	Devlin Fieldhouse (453); New Orleans, LA
January 5, 2023; 6:00 p.m., ESPN+		Houston	L 56–59	10–5 (0–2)	Devlin Fieldhouse (476); New Orleans, LA
January 8, 2023; 1:00 p.m., ESPN+		at East Carolina	L 53–63	10–6 (0–3)	Williams Arena (774); Greenville, NC
January 11, 2023; 6:00 p.m., ESPN+		Wichita State	W 76–53	11–6 (1–3)	Devlin Fieldhouse (460); New Orleans, LA
January 14, 2023; 6:00 p.m., ESPN+		at South Florida	L 53–66	11–7 (1–4)	Yuengling Center (2,506); Tampa, FL
January 17, 2023; 5:00 p.m., ESPN+		at UCF	W 64–50	12–7 (2–4)	Addition Financial Arena (2,746); Orlando, FL
January 21, 2023; 2:00 p.m., ESPN+		Tulsa	W 77–72	13–7 (3–4)	Devlin Fieldhouse (568); New Orleans, LA
January 25, 2023; 6:00 p.m., ESPN+		Temple	L 59–68	13–8 (3–5)	Devlin Fieldhouse (487); New Orleans, LA
January 29, 2023; 1:00 p.m., ESPNU		at Houston	L 36–82	13–9 (3–6)	Fertitta Center (1,007); Houston, TX
February 4, 2023; 2:00 p.m., ESPN+		Cincinnati	L 50–53	13–10 (3–7)	Devlin Fieldhouse (584); New Orleans, LA
February 9, 2023; 6:00 p.m., ESPN+		at Wichita State	L 61–69	13–11 (3–8)	Charles Koch Arena (1,462); Wichita, KS
February 12, 2023; 1:00 p.m., ESPN+		at Tulsa	W 69–67	14–11 (4–8)	Reynolds Center (1,364); Tulsa, OK
February 15, 2023; 6:00 p.m., ESPN+		SMU	W 52–50	15–11 (5–8)	Devlin Fieldhouse (880); New Orleans, LA
February 18, 2023; 1:00 p.m., ESPN+		at Cincinnati	W 65–54	16–11 (6–8)	Fifth Third Arena (892); Cincinnati, OH
February 25, 2023; 2:00 p.m., ESPN+		East Carolina	W 64–56	17–11 (7–8)	Devlin Fieldhouse (564); New Orleans, LA
March 1, 2023; 7:00 p.m., ESPN+		at Memphis	L 44–55	17–12 (7–9)	Elma Roane Fieldhouse (1,146); Memphis, TN
AAC women's tournament
March 6, 2023; 5:00 p.m., ESPN+	(6)	vs. (11) Cincinnati; First round	W 61–52	18–12	Dickies Arena (1,697); Fort Worth, TX
March 7, 2023; 8:00 p.m., ESPN+	(6)	vs. (3) East Carolina; Quarterfinals	L 58–69	18–13	Dickies Arena (1,676); Fort Worth, TX
WNIT
March 17, 2023; 7:00 p.m., SECN+		at Auburn; First round	L 58–73	18–14	Neville Arena (921); Auburn, AL
*Non-conference game. ^{#}Rankings from AP poll. (#) Tournament seedings in parentheses. All times are in Central.

== Rankings ==
Regular-season polls
Poll	Pre- season	Week 2	Week 3	Week 4	Week 5	Week 6	Week 7	Week 8	Week 9	Week 10	Week 11	Week 12	Week 13	Week 14	Week 15	Week 16	Week 17	Week 18	Week 19	Final
AP																				
Coaches																				

Legend
	Increase in ranking
	Decrease in ranking
	Not ranked previous week
(RV)	Received votes

== See also ==
- 2022–23 Tulane Green Wave men's basketball team
