= 2022–23 UCF Knights women's basketball team =

American college basketball season

2022–23 UCF Knights women's basketball
- Conference: American Athletic Conference
- Record: 14–15 (4–11 The American)
- Head coach: Sytia Messer (1st season)
- Assistant coaches: Tennille Adams; Greg Brown; Michelle Edwards
- Home arena: Addition Financial Arena

2022–23 American Athletic Conference women's basketball standings
	Conf.				Overall
Team	W		L	PCT	W		L	PCT
South Florida	15	–	1	.938	27	–	7	.794
Memphis	11	–	4	.733	22	–	11	.667
East Carolina †	11	–	5	.688	23	–	9	.719
Houston	10	–	5	.667	15	–	16	.484
SMU	7	–	8	.467	17	–	12	.586
Tulane	7	–	9	.438	18	–	14	.563
Tulsa	7	–	9	.438	17	–	13	.567
Wichita State	6	–	10	.375	18	–	15	.545
Temple	6	–	10	.375	11	–	18	.379
UCF	4	–	11	.267	14	–	15	.483
Cincinnati	2	–	14	.125	9	–	21	.300
† 2023 AAC tournament winner As of March 24, 2023; Rankings from AP poll Source: The American

The 2022–23 UCF Knights women's basketball team represented the University of Central Florida during the 2022–23 NCAA Division I basketball season. The Knights competed in Division I of the National Collegiate Athletic Association (NCAA) and the American Athletic Conference (The American). The Knights, in the program's 46th season of basketball, were led by first-year head coach Sytia Messer, and played their home games at the Addition Financial Arena on the university's main campus in Orlando, Florida.

This was the last season that UCF played in the American Athletic Conference before moving to the Big 12 Conference.

== Previous season ==
The Knights finished the 2021–22 season 22–3 and were American Athletic Conference champions at 14–1, winning the conference tournament and an automatic bid to the 2022 NCAA Division I women's basketball tournament, where they defeated Florida in the first round before losing to UConn in the second round.

== Offseason ==
=== Departures ===
Due to COVID-19 disruptions throughout NCAA sports in 2020–21, the NCAA announced that the 2020–21 season would not count against the athletic eligibility of any individual involved in an NCAA winter sport, including women's basketball. This meant that all seniors in 2020–21 had the option to return for 2021–22.

Name	Number	Pos.	Height	Year	Hometown	Reason for departure
Tay Sanders	1	G	6'1"	Senior	Bartow, FL	Graduated
Diamond Battles	3	G	5'8"	Senior	Winter Haven, FL	Graduate transferred to Georgia
Masseny Kaba	5	F	6'3"	Senior	Dorchester, MA	Graduated/went undrafted in 2022 NBA draft; signed with the Chicago Sky
Becca Ripley	11	G	6'0"	(redshirt) Senior	Stratham, NH	Graduated
Alisha Lewis	23	G	5'7"	Junior	Wallingford, PA	Transferred to Georgia
Jnaya Walker	24	F	6'1"	Senior	Bolingbrook, IL	Graduate transferred to Central Michigan
Ahna Burney	25	G	5'8"	Junior	Vancouver, WA	TBD
Neila Luma	30	F	6'0"	(redshirt) Senior	Macungie, PA	Graduated
Shania Meertens	31	G	5'8"	(redshirt) Senior	Winter Springs, FL	Graduated
Brittney Smith	32	F	6'3"	Senior	Orlando, FL	Graduate transferred to Georgia
Savannah Henderson		G	6'1"	Freshman	Orlando, FL	Transferred to Georgia

=== Incoming transfers ===
Name	Number	Pos.	Height	Year	Hometown	Previous school
Mya Burns	10	G	6'0"	Senior	North Augusta, GA	Georgia Southern
Rachel Ranke	12	G	6'1"	GS senior	Burnsville, MN	Kansas State
Taylor Gibson	15	F	6'2"	Sophomore	Upper Marlboro, MD	Michigan
Anzhane' Hutton	23	F	6'0"	Junior	Dallas, TX	Howard
Ashley Foster	24	G	5'8"	Senior	McDonough, GA	Georgia State
Morgan Robinson-Nwagwu	30	G	5'8"	Senior	Norcross, GA	Gulf Coast State College

==== Recruiting ====
There was no recruiting class of 2022.

== Roster ==
2022–23 UCF Knights women's basketball team
Players
Coaches

Pos.	#	Name	Height	Year	Previous school	Hometown
G	0	Laila Jewett	5 ft 10 in (1.78 m)	So	Bishop Ireton	Woodbridge, VA
G	4	Kiera Brown	5 ft 9 in (1.75 m)	RS So	Palm Beach Gardens	Rivera Beach, FL
G	5	Tiani Abrams	6 ft 1 in (1.85 m)	Fr	Rancho Buena Vista	Vista, CA
G	10	Mya Burns	6 ft 0 in (1.83 m)	Sr	North Augusta; Georgia Southern	North Augusta, SC
G	11	Becca Ripley	6 ft 0 in (1.83 m)	RS Sr	New Hampton	Stratham, NH
G	12	Rachel Ranke	6 ft 1 in (1.85 m)	GS	Eastview; Kansas State	Burnsville, MN
G	14	Asia Todd	5 ft 9 in (1.75 m)	Sr	Clayton; Liberty	Clayton, NC
F	15	Taylor Gibson	6 ft 2 in (1.88 m)	So	Bishop McNamara; Michigan	Upper Marlboro, MD
F	20	Bryana Hardy	6 ft 2 in (1.88 m)	Fr	Lovejoy	Lovejoy, GA
G	22	Sierra Godbolt	5 ft 6 in (1.68 m)	Fr	Lake Highland Prep	Orlando, FL
F	23	Anzhané Hutton	6 ft 0 in (1.83 m)	Jr	Cedar Hill; Howard	Dallas, TX
G	24	Ashley Foster	5 ft 8 in (1.73 m)	Sr	Eagle's Landing; Georgia State	McDonough, GA
G	30	Morgan Robinson-Nwagwu	5 ft 8 in (1.73 m)	Sr	Norcross; Gulf Coast State College	Norcross, GA
F	33	Destiny Thomas	6 ft 2 in (1.88 m)	Sr	Forest Park	Atlanta, GA
F	42	Ashton Verhulst	6 ft 2 in (1.88 m)	Jr	Bishop Miege	Desoto, KS

Head coach

- Sytia Messer (Arkansas)

Assistant coach(es)

- Tennille Adams (Arkansas)
- Greg Brown (Lipscomb)
- Michelle Edwards (Iowa)

Legend

- (C) Team captain
- (S) Suspended
- (I) Ineligible
- (W) Walk-on
- Injured
- Current redshirt

Roster

== Schedule and results ==
Date time, TV	Rank^{#}	Opponent^{#}	Result	Record	High points	High rebounds	High assists	Site (attendance) city, state
Exhibition
October 30, 2022*; 2:00 p.m.		Saint Leo	W 71–43		–	–	–	Addition Financial Arena; Orlando, FL
Non-conference regular season
November 7, 2022*; 6:00 p.m., ESPN+		Winthrop	W 72–32	1–0	14 – Hardy	11 – Thomas	4 – Godbolt	Addition Financial Arena (2,730); Orlando, FL
November 10, 2022*; 6:00 p.m., ESPN+		Mercer	Canceled					Addition Financial Arena; Orlando, FL
November 15, 2022*; 7:00 p.m., ESPN+		at Campbell	W 62–60	2–0	12 – Jewett	9 – Thomas	6 – Jewett	Gore Arena (1,276); Buies Creek, NC
November 22, 2022*; 6:00 p.m., ESPN+		Louisiana–Monroe	W 78–54	3–0	16 – Thomas	9 – Jewett	4 – Tied	Addition Financial Arena (579); Orlando, FL
November 26, 2022*; 2:00 p.m., ESPN+		Samford; UCF Thanksgiving Classic	W 79–74 ^{2OT}	4–0	34 – Jewett	15 – Thomas	3 – Tied	Addition Financial Arena (210); Orlando, FL
November 27, 2022*; 2:00 p.m., ESPN+		Southeast Missouri State; UCF Thanksgiving Classic	W 67–41	5–0	17 – Gibson	10 – Tied	4 – Godbolt	Addition Financial Arena (228); Orlando, FL
December 1, 2022*; 6:00 p.m., ESPN+		Sam Houston	W 67–55	6–0	22 – Thomas	18 – Thomas	3 – Godbolt	Addition Financial Arena (2,688); Orlando, FL
December 3, 2022*; 3:00 p.m., SECN+		at Auburn	L 46–86	6–1	9 – Tied	8 – Thomas	0 – Tied	Neville Arena (1,892); Auburn, AL
December 11, 2022*; 3:00 p.m., ESPN+		Seton Hall	L 56–63	6–2	16 – Thomas	24 – Thomas	5 – Godbolt	Addition Financial Arena (2,841); Orlando, FL
December 14, 2022*; 6:30 p.m., SECN+		at Tennessee	L 64–99	6–3	12 – Burns	6 – Burns	6 – Godbolt	Thompson–Boling Arena (7,188); Knoxville, TN
December 20, 2022*; 2:00 p.m., ESPN+		Idaho State; UCF Christmas Classic	W 67–50	7–3	16 – Burns	11 – Thomas	4 – Thomas	Addition Financial Arena (342); Orlando, FL
December 21, 2022*; 12:00 p.m., ESPN+		Elon; UCF Christmas Classic	W 64–46	8–3	21 – Ranke	11 – Thomas	8 – Godbolt	Addition Financial Arena (448); Orlando, FL
December 29, 2022*; 6:00 p.m., ESPN+		Texas Southern	W 92–67	9–3	22 – Hutton	11 – Thomas	6 – Godbolt	Addition Financial Arena (2,761); Orlando, FL
AAC regular season
January 3, 2023; 8:00 p.m., ESPN+		at SMU	L 51–61	9–4 (0–1)	11 – Ranke	10 – Thomas	3 – Jewett	Moody Coliseum (572); Dallas, TX
January 7, 2023; 1:00 p.m., ESPN+		Tulsa	L 75–80	9–5 (0–2)	22 – Hutton	13 – Hutton	4 – Tied	Addition Financial Arena (2,765); Orlando, FL
January 10, 2023; 8:00 p.m., ESPN+		at Houston	L 42–80	9–6 (0–3)	9 – Hardy	10 – Hardy	1 – Tied	Fertitta Center (570); Houston, TX
January 15, 2023; 1:00 p.m., ESPN+		Wichita State	W 59–56	10–6 (1–3)	24 – Thomas	13 – Thomas	4 – Tied	Addition Financial Arena (2,821); Orlando, FL
January 17, 2023; 6:00 p.m., ESPN+		Tulane	L 50–64	10–7 (1–4)	15 – Burns	7 – Tied	2 – Tied	Addition Financial Arena (2,746); Orlando, FL
January 22, 2023; 2:00 p.m., ESPNU		at South Florida; War on I-4	L 51–83	10–8 (1–5)	16 – Hutton	10 – Hutton	3 – Jewett	Yuengling Center (4,227); Tampa, FL
January 28, 2023; 2:00 p.m., ESPN+		at Temple	L 56–63	10–9 (1–6)	16 – Thomas	13 – Thomas	2 – Tied	Liacouras Center (1,939); Philadelphia, PA
February 1, 2023; 6:00 p.m., ESPN+		SMU	Postponed					Addition Financial Arena; Orlando, FL
February 4, 2023; 2:00 p.m., ESPN+		East Carolina	L 54–68	10–10 (1–7)	14 – Thomas	15 – Thomas	2 – Tied	Addition Financial Arena (2,820); Orlando, FL
February 8, 2023; 7:00 p.m., ESPN+		at Cincinnati	W 60–57	11–10 (2–7)	16 – Ranke	4 – Tied	6 – Godbolt	Fifth Third Arena (627); Cincinnati, OH
February 11, 2023; 3:00 p.m., ESPN+		at Memphis	L 48–50 ^{OT}	11–11 (2–8)	12 – Burns	13 – Burns	3 – Ranke	Elma Roane Fieldhouse (687); Memphis, TN
February 15, 2023; 7:00 p.m., ESPN+		South Florida; War of I-4	L 44–73	11–12 (2–9)	8 – Brown	13 – Burns	3 – Ranke	Addition Financial Arena (3,354); Orlando, FL
February 18, 2023; 2:00 p.m., ESPN+		at East Carolina	L 57–63	11–13 (2–10)	14 – Gibson	16 – Thomas	3 – Jewett	Williams Arena (1,110); Greenville, NC
February 21, 2023; 6:00 p.m., ESPN+		Temple	W 57–53	12–13 (3–10)	17 – Hutton	11 – Hutton	3 – Tied	Addition Financial Arena (2,696); Orlando, FL
February 25, 2023; 2:00 p.m., ESPN+		Cincinnati	W 64–54 ^{OT}	13–13 (4–10)	21 – Thomas	20 – Thomas	4 – Godbolt	Addition Financial Arena (3,037); Orlando, FL
March 1, 2023; 7:30 p.m., ESPN+		at Tulsa	L 60–70	13–14 (4–11)	21 – Burns	16 – Thomas	3 – Godbolt	Reynolds Center (1,640); Tulsa, OK
AAC Women's Tournament
March 6, 2023; 4:00 p.m., ESPN+	(10)	vs. (7) Tulsa; First Round	W 69–53	14–14	20 – Jewett	12 – Thomas	10 – Godbolt	Dickies Arena; Fort Worth, TX
March 7, 2023; 7:00 p.m., ESPN+	(10)	vs. (2) Memphis; Quarterfinals	L 46–48	14–15	9 – Gibson	10 – Thomas	8 – Godbolt	Dickies Arena; Fort Worth, TX
*Non-conference game. ^{#}Rankings from AP Poll. (#) Tournament seedings in parentheses. All times are in Eastern Time.

== Rankings ==
Ranking movements Legend: ██ Increase in ranking ██ Decrease in ranking — = Not ranked RV = Received votes
	Week																				
Poll	Pre	1	2	3	4	5	6	7	8	9	10	11	12	13	14	15	16	17	18	19	Final
AP	RV	RV*	RV	—	—	—	—	—	—	—	—	—	—	—	—	—	—	—			Not released
Coaches	RV	RV*	—^	—	—	—	—	—	—	—	—	—	—	—	—	—	—				

*The preseason and week 1 polls were the same.
^Coaches did not release a week 2 poll.

== See also ==
- 2022–23 UCF Knights men's basketball team
