= 2022–23 East Carolina Pirates women's basketball team =

American college basketball season

2022–23 East Carolina Pirates women's basketball

AAC tournament champions

NCAA tournament, first round
- Conference: American Athletic Conference
- Record: 23–10 (11–5 The American)
- Head coach: Kim McNeill (4th season)
- Assistant coaches: Cory McNeill; Tamoria Holmes; Jeff Williams
- Home arena: Williams Arena

2022–23 American Athletic Conference women's basketball standings
	Conf.				Overall
Team	W		L	PCT	W		L	PCT
South Florida	15	–	1	.938	27	–	7	.794
Memphis	11	–	4	.733	22	–	11	.667
East Carolina †	11	–	5	.688	23	–	9	.719
Houston	10	–	5	.667	15	–	16	.484
SMU	7	–	8	.467	17	–	12	.586
Tulane	7	–	9	.438	18	–	14	.563
Tulsa	7	–	9	.438	17	–	13	.567
Wichita State	6	–	10	.375	18	–	15	.545
Temple	6	–	10	.375	11	–	18	.379
UCF	4	–	11	.267	14	–	15	.483
Cincinnati	2	–	14	.125	9	–	21	.300
† 2023 AAC tournament winner As of March 24, 2023; Rankings from AP poll Source: The American

The 2022–23 East Carolina Pirates women's basketball team represented East Carolina University during the 2022–23 NCAA Division I women's basketball season. The Pirates, led by fourth-year head coach Kim McNeill, were ninth-year members of the American Athletic Conference (AAC) and played their home games at Williams Arena at Minges Coliseum in Greenville, North Carolina.

== Previous season ==
The Pirates finished the 2021–22 season 11–18, 4–11 in AAC play, to finish in a tie for last place. They lost in the first round of the AAC women's tournament to Memphis.

== Offseason ==
=== Departures ===
Due to COVID-19 disruptions throughout NCAA sports in 2020–21, the NCAA announced that the 2020–21 season would not count against the athletic eligibility of any individual involved in an NCAA winter sport, including women's basketball. This meant that all seniors in 2020–21 had the option to return for 2021–22.

Name	Number	Pos.	Height	Year	Hometown	Reason for departure
Taniyah Thompson	1	G	5' 11"	Junior	Hamden, CT	Transferred to Penn State
Raven Johnson	11	G	6' 0"	GS Senior	Lilburn, GA	Graduated
Lalia Acox	21	F	6' 0"	Freshman	Blythewood, SC	Transferred to North Carolina A&T
Da'Ja Green	35	G	5' 6"	GS Senior	Ellenwood, GA	Graduated
Tylar Bennett	55	F	6' 4"	GS Senior	Redford, MI	Graduated

=== Incoming transfers ===
Name	Number	Pos.	Height	Year	Hometown	Previous school
Micah Dennis	1	G	5' 9"	Junior	Toronto, ON	Oklahoma State
Kimora Jenkins	24	G	6' 1"	Sophomore	Long Island, NY	Georgia

==== Recruiting ====
College recruiting information
Name	Hometown	School	Height	Weight	Commit date
Amiya Joyner; F	Farmville, NC	Farmville High School	6 ft 2 in (1.88 m)	N/A	
Amiya Joyner; F	Recruit ratings: ESPN: (93)				
Overall recruit ranking:
Note: In many cases, Scout, Rivals, 247Sports, On3, and ESPN may conflict in their listings of height and weight.; In these cases, the average was taken. ESPN grades are on a 100-point scale.; Sources: "2022 Player Commits". ESPN. Archived from the original on March 10, 2023.

==== Recruiting class of 2023 ====
College recruiting information (2023)
Name	Hometown	School	Height	Weight	Commit date
Khia Miller; G	Woodbridge, MD	Sidwell Friends School	5 ft 10 in (1.78 m)	N/A	
Khia Miller; G	Recruit ratings: ESPN: (91)				
Overall recruit ranking:
Note: In many cases, Scout, Rivals, 247Sports, On3, and ESPN may conflict in their listings of height and weight.; In these cases, the average was taken. ESPN grades are on a 100-point scale.; Sources: "2023 Player Commits". ESPN. Archived from the original on March 10, 2023.

== Media ==
All Pirates home and road games had a video stream on ESPN+.

== Roster ==
2022–23 East Carolina Pirates women's basketball team
Players
Coaches

Pos.	#	Name	Height	Year	Previous school	Hometown
G	0	Alexsia Rose	5 ft 7 in (1.7 m)	Jr	Bloomfield	Bloomfield, CT
G	1	Micah Dennis	5 ft 9 in (1.75 m)	Sr	Cairine Wilson; Oklahoma State	Toronto, ON
G	2	Paige Lyons	5 ft 7 in (1.7 m)	So	Wesleyan School	Norcross, GA
G	3	Xianna Josephs	6 ft 0 in (1.83 m)	Sr	Putnam Science Academy	Brampton, ON
G	4	Synia Johnson	5 ft 9 in (1.75 m)	Jr	Riverdale Baptist	Waldorf, MD
G	5	Jayla Hearp	5 ft 9 in (1.75 m)	Fr	Smithfield	Hampton, VA
G/F	12	Morgan Moseley	5 ft 11 in (1.8 m)	Jr	Saint James School	Centreville, MD
G	14	Bobbi Smith	5 ft 11 in (1.8 m)	Fr	Southeast Raleigh	Garner, NC
F	20	Iycez Adams	5 ft 11 in (1.8 m)	So	Quality Education Academy	Kernersville, NC
G	22	Danae McNeal	6 ft 0 in (1.83 m)	Sr	Swansea; Clemson	Swansea, SC
F	23	Amiya Joyner	6 ft 2 in (1.88 m)	Fr	Farmville Central	Farmville, NC
G	24	Kimora Jenkins	6 ft 1 in (1.85 m)	So	Millbrook; Georgia	Long Island, NY
C	31	Brittany Franklin	6 ft 5 in (1.96 m)	GS	Plymouth; Kansas	Plymouth, NC
F	33	Tiara Chambers	6 ft 3 in (1.91 m)	GS	I. C. Norcom	Portsmouth, VA
G	55	Samora Watson	5 ft 6 in (1.68 m)	Fr	Clear Falls	League City, TX

Head coach

- Kim McNeill (Richmond)

Assistant coach(es)

- Cory McNeill (Morgan State)
- Tamoria Holmes (Howard)
- Jeff Williams (Howard)

Legend

- (C) Team captain
- (S) Suspended
- (I) Ineligible
- (W) Walk-on
- Injured
- Current redshirt

Roster
Last update: April 3, 2024

== Schedule and results ==
Date time, TV	Rank^{#}	Opponent^{#}	Result	Record	High points	High rebounds	High assists	Site (attendance) city, state
Non-conference regular season
November 7, 2022*; 6:00 p.m., ESPN+		South Carolina State	W 71–35	1–0	14 – McNeal	8 – Joyner	3 – tied	Williams Arena (717); Greenville, NC
November 10, 2022*; 6:00 p.m., ESPN+		Wake Forest	L 46–57	1–1	13 – McNeal	7 – tied	2 – tied	Williams Arena (991); Greenville, NC
November 13, 2022*; 2:00 p.m., ESPN+		UNC Wilmington	W 76–49	2–1	18 – Rose	4 – McNeal	4 – Johnson	Williams Arena (773); Greenville, NC
November 16, 2022*; 11:00 a.m., ESPN+		High Point	W 65–54 ^{OT}	3–1	19 – McNeal	9 – Rose	4 – Johnson	Williams Arena (6,657); Greenville, NC
November 20, 2022*; 5:00 p.m., ESPN+		Charleston Southern	W 64–31	4–1	17 – McNeal	10 – Joyner	3 – tied	Williams Arena (888); Greenville, NC
November 26, 2022*; 5:00 p.m., ACCNX		vs. Liberty; Cavalier Classic	W 72–64	5–1	18 – Rose	10 – Franklin	2 – tied	John Paul Jones Arena (247); Charlottesville, VA
November 27, 2022*; 2:00 p.m., ACCN		at Virginia; Cavalier Classic	L 50–72	5–2	14 – McNeal	4 – Jenkins	2 – tied	John Paul Jones Arena (2,854); Charlottesville, VA
December 1, 2022*; 7:00 p.m., ESPN+		at George Mason	L 41–54	5–3	13 – Johnson	9 – Chambers	1 – tied	EagleBank Arena (679); Fairfax, VA
December 4, 2022*; 2:00 p.m., ESPN+		VCU	W 69–51	6–3	17 – McNeal	7 – Johnson	5 – Rose	Williams Arena (665); Greenville, NC
December 6, 2022*; 6:00 p.m., ESPN+		Maryland Eastern Shore	W 67–41	7–3	17 – McNeal	7 – Moseley	3 – tied	Williams Arena (573); Greenville, NC
December 15, 2022*; 11:00 a.m., ESPN+		at Gardner–Webb	L 59–67	7–4	10 – Joyner	7 – tied	2 – Joyner	Paul Porter Arena (1,512); Boiling Springs, NC
December 19, 2022*; 6:00 p.m., ESPN+		North Carolina A&T	W 79–49	8–4	19 – McNeal	11 – Joyner	5 – Dennis	Williams Arena (860); Greenville, NC
December 21, 2022*; 3:00 p.m., FloSports		at Hampton	W 64–60	9–4	19 – Joyner	11 – Joyner	4 – Dennis	Hampton Convocation Center (339); Hampton, VA
AAC regular season
December 30, 2022; 6:00 p.m., ESPN+		Tulsa	L 47–55	9–5 (0–1)	16 – Joyner	16 – Joyner	3 – tied	Williams Arena (722); Greenville, NC
January 3, 2023; 8:00 p.m., ESPN+		at Memphis	W 55–47	10–5 (1–1)	20 – McNeal	10 – Joyner	3 – Joyner	Elma Roane Fieldhouse (749); Memphis, TN
January 8, 2023; 2:00 p.m., ESPN+		Tulane	W 63–53	11–5 (2–1)	26 – McNeal	12 – Joyner	4 – tied	Williams Arena (774); Greenville, NC
January 11, 2023; 12:00 p.m., ESPN+		at Temple	W 72–51	12–5 (3–1)	28 – McNeal	8 – Joyner	4 – Hearp	Liacouras Center (3,090); Philadelphia, PA
January 14, 2023; 7:00 p.m., ESPN+		at SMU	L 66–68	12–6 (3–2)	26 – McNeal	7 – Joyner	8 – Dennis	Moody Coliseum (671); Dallas, TX
January 18, 2023; 6:00 p.m., ESPN+		Cincinnati	W 61–53	13–6 (4–2)	18 – tied	10 – Joyner	3 – tied	Williams Arena (680); Greenville, NC
January 21, 2023; 3:00 p.m., ESPN+		at Wichita State	W 66–57	14–6 (5–2)	19 – Dennis	5 – tied	2 – tied	Charles Koch Arena (1,508); Wichita, KS
January 25, 2023; 6:00 p.m., ESPN+		Memphis	L 53–61	14–7 (5–3)	19 – McNeal	13 – Joyner	2 – tied	Williams Arena (731); Greenville, NC
January 31, 2023; 7:00 p.m., ESPN+		at No. 25 South Florida	L 48–72	14–8 (5–4)	13 – Joyner	13 – Joyner	3 – McNeal	Yuengling Center (2,184); Tampa, FL
February 4, 2023; 2:00 p.m., ESPN+		at UCF	W 68–54	15–8 (6–4)	27 – McNeal	11 – Joyner	3 – tied	Addition Financial Arena (2,820); Orlando, FL
February 8, 2023; 6:00 p.m., ESPN+		Temple	W 67–52	16–8 (7–4)	23 – Joyner	14 – Joyner	4 – Joyner	Williams Arena (898); Greenville, NC
February 12, 2023; 2:00 p.m., ESPN+		Wichita State	W 79–62	17–8 (8–4)	22 – McNeal	10 – Joyner	3 – tied	Williams Arena (1,537); Greenville, NC
February 15, 2023; 7:00 p.m., ESPN+		at Cincinnati	W 68–57	18–8 (9–4)	30 – McNeal	15 – Joyner	5 – Dennis	Fifth Third Arena (941); Cincinnati, OH
February 18, 2023; 2:00 p.m., ESPN+		UCF	W 63–57	19–8 (10–4)	19 – McNeal	12 – Joyner	4 – tied	Williams Arena (1,110); Greenville, NC
February 22, 2023; 6:00 p.m., ESPN+		Houston	W 88–83 ^{3OT}	20–8 (11–4)	34 – McNeal	15 – Joyner	12 – Dennis	Williams Arena (2,044); Greenville, NC
February 25, 2023; 3:00 p.m., ESPN+		at Tulane	L 56–64	20–9 (11–5)	24 – McNeal	14 – Joyner	4 – Johnson	Devlin Fieldhouse (564); New Orleans, LA
AAC women's tournament
March 7, 2023; 9:00 p.m., ESPN+	(3)	vs. (6) Tulane; Quarterfinals	W 69–58	21–9	17 – Dennis	19 – Joyner	4 – McNeal	Dickies Arena (1,676); Fort Worth, TX
March 8, 2023; 7:00 p.m., ESPN+	(3)	vs. (2) Memphis; Semifinals	W 69–60	22–9	22 – McNeal	9 – Joyner	6 – Joyner	Dickies Arena (1,671); Fort Worth, TX
March 9, 2023; 9:00 p.m., ESPNU	(3)	vs. (4) Houston; Final	W 46–44	23–9	13 – Johnson	15 – Joyner	3 – tied	Dickies Arena (5,945); Fort Worth, TX
NCAA tournament
March 18, 2023*; 10:00 p.m., ESPN	(13 S4)	at (4 S4) No. 15 Texas; First round	L 40–79	23–10	13 – McNeal	8 – Joyner	1 – tied	Moody Center (4,915); Austin, TX
*Non-conference game. ^{#}Rankings from AP poll. (#) Tournament seedings in parentheses. S4=Seattle 4. All times are in Eastern.

== Rankings ==
Ranking movements Legend: ██ Increase in ranking ██ Decrease in ranking — = Not ranked RV = Received votes
	Week																			
Poll	Pre	1	2	3	4	5	6	7	8	9	10	11	12	13	14	15	16	17	18	Final
AP	—	—*	—	—	—	—	—	—	—	—	—	—	—	—	—	—	—	—	—	Not released
Coaches	—	—*	—^	—	—	RV	—	—	—	—	—	—	—	—	—	—	—	—		

*The preseason and week 1 polls were the same.
^Coaches did not release a week 2 poll.

== See also ==
- 2022–23 East Carolina Pirates men's basketball team
