= 2022–23 South Florida Bulls women's basketball team =

American college basketball season

2022–23 South Florida Bulls women's basketball

AAC regular season champions

NCAA tournament, Second Round
- Conference: American Athletic Conference
- Record: 27–7 (15–1 The American)
- Head coach: Jose Fernandez (23rd season)
- Associate head coach: Michele Woods-Baxter
- Assistant coaches: Danny Hughes; Yolisha Jackson
- Home arena: Yuengling Center

2022–23 American Athletic Conference women's basketball standings
	Conf.				Overall
Team	W		L	PCT	W		L	PCT
South Florida	15	–	1	.938	27	–	7	.794
Memphis	11	–	4	.733	22	–	11	.667
East Carolina †	11	–	5	.688	23	–	9	.719
Houston	10	–	5	.667	15	–	16	.484
SMU	7	–	8	.467	17	–	12	.586
Tulane	7	–	9	.438	18	–	14	.563
Tulsa	7	–	9	.438	17	–	13	.567
Wichita State	6	–	10	.375	18	–	15	.545
Temple	6	–	10	.375	11	–	18	.379
UCF	4	–	11	.267	14	–	15	.483
Cincinnati	2	–	14	.125	9	–	21	.300
† 2023 AAC tournament winner As of March 24, 2023; Rankings from AP poll Source: The American

The 2022–23 South Florida Bulls women's basketball team represented the University of South Florida in the 2022–23 NCAA Division I women's basketball season. The Bulls, coached by Jose Fernandez in his 23rd season, played their home games at Yuengling Center in Tampa, Florida. This was USF's tenth season as a member of the American Athletic Conference, known as The American or AAC.

== Previous season ==
The Bulls finished the 2021–22 season 24–9, 12–3 in AAC play to finish in second place. They advanced to the championship game of the American Athletic Conference women's tournament, where they lost to UCF. They received an at-large bid to the NCAA women's tournament, where they lost to Miami in the first round.

== Offseason ==
=== Departures ===
Due to COVID-19 disruptions throughout NCAA sports in 2020–21, the NCAA announced that the 2020–21 season would not count against the athletic eligibility of any individual involved in an NCAA winter sport, including women's basketball. This meant that all seniors in 2020–21 had the option to return for 2021–22.

Name	Number	Pos.	Height	Year	Hometown	Reason for departure
Odeth Betancourt	0	G	6'2"	Sophomore	San Cristóbal, Venezuela	Transferred to Western Kentucky
Mihaela Lazić	2	G	5'6"	(redshirt) Freshman	Slavonski Brod, Croatia	Transferred to FIU
Sydni Harvey	3	G	5'10"	Junior	Nashville, TN	Transferred to Belmont
Elisa Pinzan	4	G	5'8"	Junior	Murano, Italy	Transferred to Maryland
Patience Williams	11	F/C	6'1"	Freshman	Minneapolis, MN	TBD
Christina Bermejo	12	F	6'1"	Sophomore	Sant Just Desvern, Spain	Transferred to LIU
Sara Guerreiro	13	F	5'8"	Freshman	Seixal, Portugal	Transferred to Cleveland State
Bethy Mununga	20	F	6'0"	Senior	Zellik, Belgium	Graduated
Shae Leverett	21	C	6'2"	Senior	Rincon, GA	Graduated

=== Incoming transfers ===
Name	Number	Pos.	Height	Year	Hometown	Previous school
Caitlin McGee	0	F	6'1"	(redshirt) Sophomore	Jacksonville, FL	Ole Miss
Priscilla Williams	2	G	6'2"	(redshirt) Sophomore	Houston, TX	Syracuse
Sammie Puisis	3	G	6'1"	Junior	Mason, OH	Florida State

==== Recruiting ====
There was no recruiting class of 2022.

== Media ==
All Bulls games aired on Bullscast Radio or CBS 1010 AM. All home games and home and away conference games were available on one of the ESPN networks or their streaming service, ESPN+.

== Roster ==
2022–23 South Florida Bulls women's basketball team
Players
Coaches

Pos.	#	Name	Height	Year	Previous school	Hometown
F	0	Caitlin McGee	6 ft 1 in (1.85 m)	RS So	Sandalwood; Ole Miss	Jacksonville, FL
G	1	Maria Alvarez	5 ft 7 in (1.7 m)	Jr	Miami Country Day School	Bal Harbour, FL
G	2	Priscilla Williams	6 ft 2 in (1.88 m)	So	Branson; Syracuse	Branson, MO
G	3	Sammie Puisis	6 ft 1 in (1.85 m)	Jr	William Mason; Florida State	Mason, OH
G	5	Elena Tsineke	5 ft 7 in (1.7 m)	Sr	Hellenic College of Thessaloniki	Thessaloniki, Greece
G	10	Janette Aarnio	5 ft 11 in (1.8 m)	Fr	Makelanrinteen lukio	Vantaa, Finland
G	12	Marina Asenio	5 ft 8 in (1.73 m)	Fr	Institut Joaquim Blume	Sabadell, Spain
F/C	14	Emma Johansson	6 ft 3 in (1.91 m)	Fr	Sandagymnasiet	Jönköping, Sweden
F	20	Daniela Gonzalez	6 ft 0 in (1.83 m)	Fr	Central Pointe Christian Academy (FL)	Jamundí, Colombia
G	22	Aerial Wilson	5 ft 10 in (1.78 m)	RS Jr	The RISE Centre; Memphis	Dundas, ON
G	24	Bella Weary	5 ft 6 in (1.68 m)	So	DME Academy	Jacksonville, FL
F	32	Dulcy Fankam Mendjiadeu	6 ft 4 in (1.93 m)	RS Sr	Walters State Community College	Nkongsamba, Cameroon
G/F	55	Carla Brito	5 ft 11 in (1.8 m)	Fr	Spar Gran Canaria	Las Palmas, Spain

Head coach

- Jose Fernandez (Miami-Dade Kendall)

Assistant coach(es)

- Michele Woods-Baxter (St. John Fisher College)
- Danny Hughes (TCU)
- Yolisha Jackson (Jacksonville)

Legend

- (C) Team captain
- (S) Suspended
- (I) Ineligible
- (W) Walk-on
- Injured
- Current redshirt

Roster

== Schedule ==
Date time, TV	Rank^{#}	Opponent^{#}	Result	Record	High points	High rebounds	High assists	Site (attendance) city, state
Non-conference regular season
November 7, 2022*; 5:30 p.m., ESPN+		Morehead State	W 87–40	1–0	20 – Puisis	10 – Fankam Mendjiadeu	7 – Wilson	Yuengling Center; Tampa, FL
November 11, 2022*; 6:00 p.m., ESPN+		Florida A&M	W 90–50	2–0	26 – Fankam Mendjiadeu	7 – Fankam Mendjiadeu	7 – Tsineke	Yuengling Center (1,821); Tampa, FL
November 13, 2022*; 1:00 p.m., ESPN+		Jacksonville	W 70–59	3–0	25 – Fankam Mendjiadeu	10 – Fankam Mendjiadeu	4 – Tied	Yuengling Center (2,327); Tampa, FL
November 16, 2022*; 7:00 p.m., ESPN+		Alabama	W 67–59	4–0	26 – Puisis	12 – Fankam Mendjiadeu	4 – Wilson	Yuengling Center (2,224); Tampa, FL
November 20, 2022*; 2:00 p.m., ESPN+		at TCU; Maggie Dixon Classic	W 66–59	5–0	21 – Tsineke	10 – Brito	7 – Wilson	Schollmaier Arena; Fort Worth, TX
November 22, 2022*; 7:00 p.m., ESPN+		New Hampshire	W 75–57	6–0	26 – Brito	12 – Fankam Mendjiadeu	3 – Tied	Yuengling Center (1,888); Tampa, FL
November 25, 2022*; 7:30 p.m., FloSports		vs. Georgia Tech; Gulf Coast Showcase Quarterfinals	W 63–50	7–0	24 – Tsineke	21 – Fankam Mendjiadeu	4 – Wilson	Hertz Arena (275); Estero, FL
November 26, 2022*; 7:30 p.m., FloSports		vs. No. 22 Michigan; Gulf Coast Showcase Semifinals	L 58–63	7–1	22 – Puisis	11 – Fankam Mendjiadeu	2 – Tied	Hertz Arena (297); Estero, FL
November 27, 2022*; 5:00 p.m., FloHoops		vs. No. 23 Villanova; Gulf Coast Showcase 3rd place game	L 50–72	7–2	17 – Puisis	17 – Fankam Mendjiadeu	3 – Tied	Hertz Arena (247); Fort Myers, FL
December 2, 2022*; 8:00 p.m., LHN/ESPN+		at No. 22 Texas	W 70–65	8–2	25 – Puisis	10 – Fankam Mendjiadeu	5 – Tied	Moody Center (5,021); Austin, TX
December 11, 2022*; 2:00 p.m., ACCN		at No. 8 NC State	L 57–65	8–3	17 – Puisis	18 – Fankam Mendjiadeu	5 – Wilson	Reynolds Coliseum (5,269); Raleigh, NC
December 14, 2022*; 11:00 a.m., ESPN+		Marshall	W 77–68	9–3	17 – Fankam Mendjiadeu	8 – Gonzalez	7 – Tsineke	Yuengling Center (5,578); Tampa, FL
December 17, 2022*; 1:00 p.m., ESPN+		La Salle	W 75–50	10–3	26 – Fankam Mendjiadeu	12 – Fankam Mendjiadeu	6 – Tsineke	Yuengling Center (2,108); Tampa, FL
December 20, 2022*; 6:30 p.m., FloSports		vs. No. 3 Ohio State; San Diego Invitational semifinals	L 86–88 ^{OT}	10–4	34 – Fankam Mendjiadeu	17 – Fankam Mendjiadeu	3 – Tied	Pechanga Arena (318); San Diego, CA
December 21, 2022*; 4:00 p.m., FloSports		vs. No. 17 Arkansas; San Diego Invitational 3rd place game	W 66–65 ^{OT}	11–4	23 – Tsineke	12 – Fankam Mendjiadeu	5 – Wilson	Pechanga Arena (303); San Diego, CA
AAC regular season
December 30, 2022; 7:00 p.m., ESPN+		at Tulane	W 69–61	12–4 (1–0)	25 – Tsineke	13 – Fankam Mendjiadeu	4 – Wilson	Devlin Fieldhouse (453); New Orleans, LA
January 3, 2023; 5:00 p.m., ESPN+		Temple	W 77–55	13–4 (2–0)	27 – Tsineke	13 – Fankam Mendjiadeu	4 – Wilson	Yuengling Center (2,084); Tampa, FL
January 7, 2023; 3:00 p.m., ESPN+		at Wichita State	W 69–46	14–4 (3–0)	26 – Puisis	7 – Fankam Mendjiadeu	9 – Wilson	Charles Koch Arena (1,561); Wichita, KS
January 11, 2023; 7:00 p.m., ESPN+		Memphis	W 58–45	15–4 (4–0)	14 – Tsineke	15 – Fankam Mendjiadeu	4 – Wilson	Yuengling Center (2,314); Tampa, FL
January 14, 2023; 7:00 p.m., ESPN+		Tulane	W 66–53	16–4 (5–0)	28 – Puisis	16 – Fankam Mendjiadeu	4 – Wilson	Yuengling Center (2,506); Tampa, FL
January 18, 2023; 8:00 p.m., ESPN+		at Houston	W 58–56	17–4 (6–0)	22 – Fankam Mendjiadeu	17 – Fankam Mendjiadeu	4 – Wilson	Fertitta Center (633); Houston, TX
January 22, 2023; 2:00 p.m., ESPNU		UCF; War on I-4	W 83–51	18–4 (7–0)	21 – Tsineke	17 – Fankam Mendjiadeu	8 – Wilson	Yuengling Center (4,227); Tampa, FL
January 25, 2023; 5:00 p.m., ESPNU		at Tulsa	W 89–68	19–4 (8–0)	25 – Fankam Mendjiadeu	15 – Fankam Mendjiadeu	8 – Wilson	Reynolds Center (1,130); Tulsa, OK
January 28, 2023; 3:00 p.m., ESPN+		at Memphis	W 67–62	20–4 (9–0)	23 – Tsineke	13 – Fankam Mendjiadeu	7 – Wilson	Elma Roane Fieldhouse (933); Memphis, TN
January 31, 2023; 7:00 p.m., ESPN+	No. 25	East Carolina	W 72–48	21–4 (10–0)	23 – Puisis	14 – Fankam Mendjiadeu	6 – Tsineke	Yuengling Center (2,184); Tampa, FL
February 4, 2023; 3:00 p.m., ESPN+	No. 25	at SMU	W 65–63	22–4 (11–0)	21 – Fankam Mendjiadeu	11 – Puisis	5 – Tied	Moody Coliseum (1,118); Dallas, TX
February 12, 2023; 2:00 p.m., ESPN2	No. 24	Houston	L 69–71	22–5 (11–1)	24 – Tsineke	19 – Fankam Mendjiadeu	5 – Wilson	Yuengling Center (2,381); Tampa, FL
February 15, 2023; 7:00 p.m., ESPN+		at UCF; War of I-4	W 73–44	23–5 (12–1)	19 – Tsineke	14 – Fankam Mendjiadeu	4 – Tied	Addition Financial Arena (3,354); Orlando, FL
February 18, 2023; 4:30 p.m., ESPN+		SMU	W 70–62	24–5 (13–1)	27 – Tsineke	10 – Fankam Mendjiadeu	8 – Wilson	Yuengling Center; Tampa, FL
February 22, 2023; 7:00 p.m., ESPN+		Tulsa	W 93–83	25–5 (14–1)	27 – Puisis	13 – Fankam Mendjiadeu	9 – Tsineke	Yuengling Center (2,454); Tampa, FL
March 1, 2023; 7:00 p.m., ESPN+	No. 25	at Cincinnati	W 85–55	26–5 (15–1)	28 – Tsineke	11 – Brito	5 – Tied	Fifth Third Arena (1,380); Cincinnati, OH
AAC Women's Tournament
March 7, 2023*; 12:00 p.m., ESPN+	(1) No. 25	vs. (8) Wichita State; Quarterfinals	L 53–65	26–6	19 – Tsineke	6 – Tied	4 – Wilson	Dickies Arena; Fort Worth, TX
NCAA Women's Tournament
March 17, 2023*; 11:30 a.m., ESPN2	(8 G1)	vs. (9 G1) Marquette; First Round	W 67–65 ^{OT}	27–6	22 – Fankam Mendjiadeu	16 – Fankam Mendjiadeu	2 – Wilson	Colonial Life Arena; Columbia, SC
March 19, 2023*; 1:00 p.m., ABC	(8 G1)	at (1 G1) No. 1 South Carolina; Second Round	L 45–76	27–7	20 – Tsineke	8 – Fankam Mendjiadeu	3 – Tsineke	Colonial Life Arena (10,335); Columbia, SC
*Non-conference game. ^{#}Rankings from AP Poll. (#) Tournament seedings in parentheses. G1=Greenville 1. All times are in EST.

== Rankings ==
Ranking movements Legend: ██ Increase in ranking ██ Decrease in ranking — = Not ranked RV = Received votes
	Week																				
Poll	Pre	1	2	3	4	5	6	7	8	9	10	11	12	13	14	15	16	17	18	19	Final
AP	RV	RV*	RV	RV	—	RV	—	—	RV	RV	RV	RV	RV	25	24	RV	RV	25	RV	RV	Not released
Coaches	RV	RV*	RV^	RV	RV	RV	RV	RV	RV	RV	RV	RV	25	22	21	23	23	22	20	24	RV

*The preseason and week 1 polls were the same.
^Coaches did not release a week 2 poll.

== See also ==
- 2022–23 South Florida Bulls men's basketball team
