= Legal successor (organization) =

A legal successor of an organization is a successor entity legally declared and recognized as such in all or some respects. Laws governing legal succession may be different for legal successors of business and non-profits, as well as in historical sense.

== Laws for nonprofits ==
In the case of a merger, the surviving organization is the legal successor to the others in respect to liability.

In the case of dissolution without assigning a legal successor, the funds and assets of the dissolved entity may be granted to other entities. The latter entities are not legal successors, but simply as grantees of the mentioned funds.

Different types of organizations may have specific laws as to legal succession in particular cases. For example, the 2015 Kansas Statute on schools, item 72-8210, says in part: "Legal successor of rights and powers; bequests and donations. The unified district shall be legal successor to all of the rights, powers and authorities vested in boards of disorganized districts of the unified district except as is otherwise provided in any of the school unification acts"
