= American Conference (NCAA) =

US college sports conference

- Formerly: Big East (1979–2013); American Athletic Conference (2013–2025)
- Association: NCAA
- Founded: May 31, 1979; 47 years ago (de jure); July 1, 2013; 13 years ago (de facto) (Note: The American is the legal all-sports successor to the Big East Conference (1979–2013). The Big East was rebranded and reorganizes as the American Athletic Conference on July 1, 2013.)
- Commissioner: Tim Pernetti (since 2024)
- Sports fielded: 21; men's: 9; women's: 12
- Division: Division I
- Subdivision: FBS
- No. of teams: 13 (14 in 2027) (full) + 9 (8 in 2027) (affiliate)
- Headquarters: Irving, Texas
- Broadcasters: ABC/ESPN; CBS Sports (Army and Navy home games only)
- Website: theamerican.org

Locations
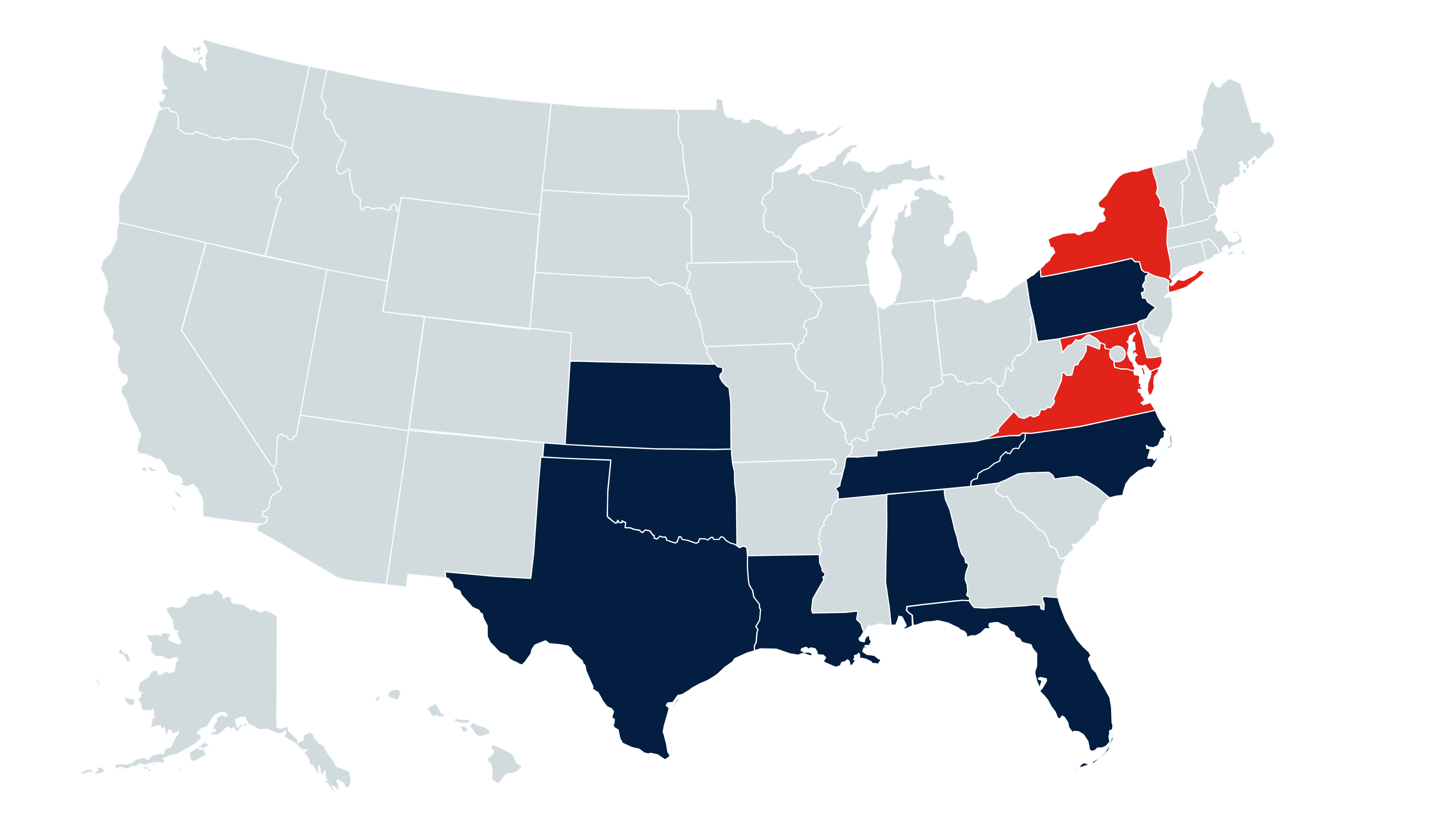
- States with full members (blue) and affiliate members (red)

The American Conference, formerly the American Athletic Conference (AAC), and also known as simply the American, is a collegiate athletic conference in the United States, featuring 13 full member universities and 6 affiliate member universities that compete in the National Collegiate Athletic Association's (NCAA) Division I. Its football teams compete in the Football Bowl Subdivision (FBS). Member universities represent a range of private and public research universities of various enrollment sizes located primarily in urban metropolitan areas in the Northeastern, Midwestern, and Southern regions of the United States.

The American's legal predecessor, the original Big East Conference, was considered one of the six collegiate power conferences of the Bowl Championship Series (BCS) era in college football, and the American inherited that status in the BCS's final season. With the advent of the College Football Playoff (CFP) in 2014, the American became a "Group of Five" conference, which shared one automatic spot in the New Year's Six bowl games during the CFP's four-team era (2014–2023). (Note: The other conferences in the "Group of Five" are Conference USA (CUSA), the Mid-American Conference (MAC), the Mountain West Conference, and the Sun Belt Conference.)

The league is the product of substantial turmoil in the former Big East during the 2010–14 conference realignment period. It is one of two conferences to emerge from the all-sports Big East in 2013. While the other successor, which does not sponsor football, purchased the Big East Conference name, the American inherited the former Big East's structure and is that conference's legal successor. However, both conferences claim 1979 as their founding date, and the same history up to 2013. The American Conference is headquartered in Irving, Texas, and led by Commissioner Tim Pernetti, who replaced the retiring Mike Aresco on June 1, 2024.

== History ==
=== The Big East ===
The Big East Conference was founded in 1979 as a basketball conference and included the colleges of Providence, St. John's, Georgetown, and Syracuse, which in turn invited Connecticut (UConn), Holy Cross, Rutgers, and Boston College to be members. UConn and Boston College would accept the invitation, while Holy Cross soon thereafter declined the invitation, and Rutgers eventually declined and remained in the Atlantic 10 Conference (then known as the Eastern 8 Conference). Seton Hall was then invited as a replacement and the conference started play with seven members.

Villanova and Pittsburgh joined shortly thereafter under the leadership of the first Big East commissioner, Dave Gavitt.

The conference remained largely unchanged until 1991, when it began to sponsor football, adding Miami as a full member, and Rutgers, Temple, Virginia Tech, and West Virginia as football-only members. Rutgers and West Virginia were offered full all-sports membership in 1995, while Virginia Tech waited until 2000 for the same offer. Temple football was kicked out after the 2004 season, but rejoined in 2012 and intended to become a full member in 2013.

The unusual structure of the Big East, with the "football" and "non-football" schools, led to instability in the conference. The waves of defection and replacement brought about by the conference realignments of 2005 and the early 2010s revealed tension between the football-sponsoring and non-football schools that eventually led to the split of the conference in 2013.

=== Realignment and reorganization ===
American Conference members
– All-sports member
– Full, non-football member
– Affiliate member (football)
– Affiliate member (other)
– Affiliate member (other) & future full member

The conference was reorganized following the tumultuous period of realignment that hobbled the Big East between 2010 and 2013. The Big East was one of the most severely impacted conferences during the early-2010s conference realignment period. In all, 14 member schools announced their departure for other conferences, and 15 other schools announced plans to join the conference (eight as all-sports members, and four for football only). Three of the latter group later backed out of their plans to join (one for all sports, and the other two for football only).

On December 15, 2012, the Big East's seven remaining non-FBS schools, Catholic institutions consisting of DePaul, Georgetown, Marquette, Providence, St. John's, Seton Hall, and Villanova announced that they voted unanimously to leave the Big East Conference effective June 30, 2015. The "Catholic 7", by leaving, were looking for a more lucrative television deal than the one they would receive by remaining with the football schools. In March 2013, representatives of the Catholic 7 announced they would leave the conference effective June 30, 2013, retaining the Big East name, $10 million, and the right to hold the conference's basketball tournament at Madison Square Garden.

Following the announcement of the departure of the Catholic 7 universities, the remaining ten football-playing members started the process of selecting a new name for the conference and choosing a new site to hold its basketball tournament. Various names were considered, with the "America 12" conference reportedly one of the finalists until rejected by college presidents sensitive of adding a number to the end of the conference name. On April 3, 2013, the conference announced that it had chosen a new name: American Athletic Conference. The conference also revealed that it prefers the nickname "The American" because it was thought "AAC" would cause too much confusion with the Atlantic Coast Conference (ACC).

Louisville and Rutgers spent one season in the newly renamed conference. On July 1, 2014, Louisville joined the ACC and Rutgers joined the Big Ten Conference. On that same day, East Carolina, Tulane, and Tulsa joined the American for all sports, while Sacramento State and San Diego State joined as affiliate members for women's rowing. Navy joined as an affiliate member in football on July 1, 2015.

==== Addition of Wichita State ====
For nearly three years, the American did not discuss the addition of any new members. However, in March 2017, media reports indicated that the conference was seriously considering adding one or more new members specifically as basketball upgrades. Wichita State, Dayton, and VCU were reportedly considered, with Wichita State being seen as the strongest candidate. By the end of that month, it was reported that talks between the American and Wichita State had advanced to the point that the two sides were discussing a timeline for membership, with the possibility of the Shockers joining as a full but non-football member as early as the 2017–18 school year. The report indicated that a final decision would be made in April. The conference's board of directors voted unanimously on April 7 to add Wichita State effective in July 2017, making the Shockers the league's first full non-football member since the Big East split.

==== Departure of UConn ====
On June 21, 2019, a Boston-area sports news website, Digital Sports Desk, revealed that UConn was expected to announce by the end of the month that it would leave the American for the Big East Conference in 2020. The story was picked up by multiple national media outlets the next day. The main issue that reportedly had to be resolved prior to any official announcement was the future of UConn football, as the Big East does not sponsor that sport, and sources indicated that the American had no interest in retaining UConn as a football-only member. Reportedly, American Athletic Conference insiders were not surprised by UConn's prospective move, as that school had been vigorously opposed to that league's most recently announced television deal.

National media believed that should UConn leave the American, the conference's likeliest response would be to bring in two new schools—one for football only and a second in non-football sports, similar to the American's sequential additions of Navy and Wichita State. The most likely prospects for football-only membership were seen as Army (then an FBS independent, with most of its other sports in the Patriot League), and Air Force (currently an all-sports member of the Mountain West Conference). Any of several schools could potentially fill the non-football slot, with Pete Thamel of Yahoo Sports considering VCU to be "the most logical target there." Thamel dismissed the prospect of the American adding a new all-sports member, saying "there's no obvious candidate who could add value in both basketball and football."

On June 24, 2019, it was reported that the Big East had formally approved an invitation for UConn to join the conference. On June 26, 2019, the UConn Board of Trustees accepted the invitation. On July 26, media reports indicated that UConn and the American had reached a buyout agreement that confirmed UConn's Big East arrival date as July 1, 2020, paying the American a $17 million exit fee.

It was widely reported that UConn was "rejoining" the Big East, given that the Huskies would be reunited with many of the schools against which it played for three decades in the original Big East. Indeed, UConn was the last charter member of the old Big East still playing in the American.

==== Added stability ====
The American took a number of steps to stabilize the conference after the departure of UConn. The first move was the addition of Old Dominion University as an affiliate member in women's lacrosse for the 2020–21 season. Old Dominion was previously added to the American for women's rowing beginning in the 2018–19 season.

The American moved its headquarters from Providence, Rhode Island to Irving, Texas. This was a planned move, to better centralize the conference offices with the member schools. Irving is in the Dallas–Fort Worth metroplex, which is also home to the headquarters of the Big 12 Conference, College Football Playoff, and the National Football Foundation. The conference also moved the men's basketball tournament to the region, to be played at the new Dickies Arena until 2022.

In the wake of the COVID-19 pandemic, some member schools have eliminated sports due to budget constraints. The University of Cincinnati eliminated its men's soccer program while East Carolina University canceled men and women's swimming and diving teams and tennis teams. Women's rowing member San Diego State University dropped that sport effective with the end of the 2020–21 season.

==== Big 12 raid and subsequent invitations to the conference ====
In late July 2021, founding Big 12 members Oklahoma and Texas jointly announced that they planned to leave the conference no later than 2025, and formally requested an invitation from the Southeastern Conference (SEC). Shortly thereafter, the American became a peripheral player in this saga when the Big 12 sent a cease and desist letter to current broadcast partner ESPN, charging the network with conspiring to damage the league by luring Oklahoma and Texas to the SEC, and also alleging that the network encouraged an unnamed conference to raid the Big 12 to pave the way for an earlier departure by Oklahoma and Texas. A later media report identified that other conference as the American. ESPN issued an official denial of the Big 12 charges, and officials from the American declined to comment.

On September 3, Sports Illustrated reported that the Big 12 Conference was on the verge of inviting four schools— including American Athletic Conference members Cincinnati, Houston, and UCF. Later that month, all three schools received and accepted membership offers on the date of the presidents' meeting, with the official announcement stating only that they would join the Big 12 no later than 2024–25. On June 10, 2022, the American and the three departing schools announced a buyout agreement had been reached, confirming those schools' 2023 departure date. At the time, it was possible that Cincinnati and UCF could remain in the conference as affiliate members for women's lacrosse and men's soccer, respectively, as the Big 12 does not sponsor those sports, though no formal announcement was made. UCF would later accept an offer of men's soccer membership from the Sun Belt Conference effective in 2023, aligning its men's soccer program with that of West Virginia, the only pre-2023 Big 12 member sponsoring men's soccer. Cincinnati would remain in The American as a women's lacrosse affiliate, but left after the 2024 season when the Big 12 added that sport.

==== Subsequent moves ====
In late September 2021, several national media outlets reported that Mountain West Conference (MW) members Air Force and Colorado State had approached the American regarding a possible move to that league. However, on October 1, the MW announced that its current membership would remain intact for the foreseeable future, removing its 12 football members (including football-only member Hawaiʻi) from the list of potential new members for the American. For its part, the American officially denied extending invitations to the two Colorado schools.

Later that month on October 18, 2021, Yahoo Sports reported that the American was preparing to receive applications from six of the 14 members of Conference USA—Charlotte, Florida Atlantic, North Texas, Rice, UAB, and UTSA. This would make the American a 14-full-member conference. The next day, ESPN reported that all six schools had submitted applications, and that each would receive a formal letter by the end of that week (October 22) detailing the terms of conference expansion. All six schools were accepted on October 21, and the conference confirmed their 2023 entry date on June 16, 2022.

==== Expansion in men's soccer and women's swimming and diving ====
A series of further realignment moves centering on the Sun Belt Conference (SBC) led to the American's men's soccer league expanding earlier than planned. This sequence began in November 2021 when James Madison announced its departure from the Colonial Athletic Association (CAA; since renamed the Coastal Athletic Association) to join the SBC in 2023. The CAA responded by invoking a provision of its bylaws to ban JMU from further conference championship events. (Note: Although the 2021 football season was then ongoing, James Madison remained eligible for, and ultimately shared, that season's CAA football title. The CAA football league, officially known as CAA Football, is a separate legal entity from the all-sports CAA, and the CAA Football bylaws lacked said provision.) The SBC responded by pushing JMU's entry forward to 2022.

Soon after this, the other three CUSA members set to move to the SBC in 2023 (Marshall, Old Dominion, and Southern Miss, with Marshall and ODU sponsoring men's soccer) announced that they would instead leave in 2022. Following a brief legal dispute, CUSA and the three schools reached a settlement that allowed those schools to join the SBC in 2022. With three men's soccer schools now joining in 2022 instead of 2023, the SBC announced it would reinstate men's soccer at that time. The new full members were joined by three full SBC members and three new associate members. Coastal Carolina played the 2021 season in CUSA. The other two full SBC members, Georgia Southern and Georgia State, played in the MAC. The new associates were Kentucky and South Carolina, which had been single-sport CUSA members since 2005; and West Virginia, which had previously announced that it would move men's soccer from the Mid-American Conference to CUSA in 2022.

CUSA was then left with only four men's soccer programs for 2022 (Charlotte, FIU, Florida Atlantic, and UAB), with all but FIU set to become full American members in 2023. The American accordingly brought all four schools in as new men's soccer members for 2022, with FIU remaining an affiliate after the others fully joined the American.

Similar changes came to women's swimming & diving, again due in part to SBC expansion. Of the schools leaving CUSA for the SBC in 2022, Marshall and Old Dominion sponsor that sport, and incoming American members Florida Atlantic, North Texas, and Rice also sponsor the sport (although Rice fields swimmers only, with no divers). The American brought the aforementioned future full members, plus FIU, into its women's swimming & diving league. As with men's soccer, FIU remained a women's swimming & diving affiliate after the other schools fully joined the conference.

==== Departure of SMU, arrival of Army ====
On September 1, 2023, SMU accepted an invitation to join the Atlantic Coast Conference for the 2024–25 season. With this, the American was now down one team.

On October 25, 2023, Army announced it would be joining the conference as a football-only member beginning in 2024, joining fellow service academy Navy. The annual Army–Navy Game, typically played at the conclusion of the regular season, continues to be played annually as a non-conference game and does not count towards conference standings. However, it is possible for the two teams to meet a second time in a season in the American Conference Football Championship Game, should they finish as the top two teams in the conference.

==== Additional expansion in men's soccer and women's swimming & diving ====
On October 25, 2024, Missouri State announced it would become an associate member in men's soccer starting with the fall 2025 season. This was followed on December 12 by the announcement that current women's lacrosse associate James Madison, Liberty, and Marshall would become associate members in women's swimming and diving beginning with the 2025–26 season.

==== Rebranding ====
On July 21, 2025, ahead of its football media days, the conference announced that it would officially shorten its name to the American Conference, dropping the word "Athletic" and the "AAC" abbreviation (which was often confused with the Atlantic Coast Conference). It also announced the new slogan "Built to Rise", and Soar the Eagle—a mascot it claimed was the first "brand ambassador" of a college athletic conference. Commissioner Tim Pernetti explained that the rebranding "prioritizes clarity, momentum, and the competitive advantage driving every part of our conference forward", and "defines who we are, service and mission -- driven institutions of higher learning with highly competitive athletics and deeply committed leaders."

==== Addition of James Madison ====
On October 12, 2026, the conference announced that women's lacrosse and women's swimming & diving affiliate James Madison would become a full American member no later than July 2028. JMU's arrival was pushed forward to July 2027 after the university and its current home of the Sun Belt Conference announced a settlement to that effect in November 2026.

=== Membership timeline ===
Full members (all-sports) Full members (non-football) Affiliate members (football-only) Affiliate member (other sport) Other Conference Other Conference Founding members from Big East Conference Founding members from Conference USA Subsequent members from Conference USA

== Member universities ==
The conference currently has 13 full member institutions – and nine affiliate members – in 15 states: Alabama, California, Florida, Kansas, Louisiana, Maryland, Missouri, New York, North Carolina, Ohio, Oklahoma, Pennsylvania, Tennessee, Texas, and Virginia. Wichita State is the only full member that does not sponsor football.

=== Current full members ===
Institution	Location	Founded	Type	Enrollment	Median earnings	Endowment (millions)	Nickname	Joined (Note: Represents the calendar year when fall sports competition begins.)	Colors
University of Alabama at Birmingham (UAB)	Birmingham, Alabama	1969	Public	21,923	$64,969	$1,002	Blazers	2023	
East Carolina University	Greenville, North Carolina	1907	Public	28,028	$60,888	$403	Pirates	2014	
Florida Atlantic University (FAU)	Boca Raton, Florida	1961 (Note: Though founded in 1961, classes did not start until 1964, and freshmen and sophomores were not admitted until 1984.)	Public	30,171	$59,690	$267	Owls	2023	
University of Memphis	Memphis, Tennessee	1912	Public	21,458	$57,507	$341	Tigers	2013	
University of North Carolina at Charlotte (Charlotte)	Charlotte, North Carolina	1946	Public	32,207	$65,370	$316	49ers	2023	
University of North Texas	Denton, Texas	1890	Public	46,940	$58,743	$294	Mean Green	2023	
Rice University	Houston, Texas	1912	Private	7,124	$110,080	$7,240	Owls	2023	
University of South Florida (USF)	Tampa, Florida	1956 (Note: Though founded in 1956, classes did not start until 1960.)	Public	50,830	$62,079	$977	Bulls	2013	
Temple University	Philadelphia, Pennsylvania	1884	State related	37,365	$67,232	$839	Owls	2013	
University of Texas at San Antonio (UTSA)	San Antonio, Texas	1969 (Note: Though founded in 1969, classes did not start until 1973, undergraduates were not admitted until 1975, and freshmen and sophomores were not admitted until 1976.)	Public	34,734	$60,333	$1,150 (Note: This refers only to the endowment under direct institutional control. It does not include any funds UTSA receives from the state's Permanent University Fund as part of the University of Texas System.)	Roadrunners	2023	
Tulane University	New Orleans, Louisiana	1834	Private	14,472	$73,816	$2,108	Green Wave	2014	
University of Tulsa	Tulsa, Oklahoma	1894	Nondenominational (Note: Historically affiliated with the Presbyterian Church (PCUSA).)	3,769	$79,396	$1,260	Golden Hurricane	2014	
Wichita State University (Note: Non-football member.)	Wichita, Kansas	1895	Public	15,778	$59,707	$331	Shockers	2017	

=== Future full members ===
Institution	Location	Founded	Type	Enrollment	Median earnings	Endowment (millions)	Nickname	Joining	Colors
James Madison University (JMU)	Harrisonburg, Virginia	1908	Public	21,496	$70,627	$156	Dukes	2027	

=== Affiliate members ===
Future full member James Madison is indicated in blue.

Institution	Location	Founded	Type	Enrollment	Nickname	Joined (Note: Represents the calendar year when fall sports competition begins.)	Colors	American Conference sport(s)	Primary conference
Florida International University (FIU)	Westchester, Florida (Note: Mailing address is Miami.)	1965 (Note: Though founded in 1965, classes did not start until 1972, and freshmen and sophomores were not admitted until 1981.)	Public	58,064	Panthers	2022		Men's soccer	CUSA
Florida International University (FIU)	Westchester, Florida	1965	Public	58,064	Panthers	2022		Women's swimming & diving	CUSA
James Madison University	Harrisonburg, Virginia	1908	Public	21,496	Dukes	2022		Women's lacrosse	Sun Belt (American in 2027)
James Madison University	Harrisonburg, Virginia	1908	Public	21,496	Dukes	2025		Women's swimming & diving	Sun Belt (American in 2027)
Liberty University	Lynchburg, Virginia	1971	Evangelical; Protestant	95,148 (Note: Includes online students. On-campus enrollment is approximately 16,000.)	Lady Flames	2025		Women's swimming & diving	CUSA
Marshall University	Huntington, West Virginia	1837	Public	11,962	Thundering Herd	2025		Women's swimming & diving	Sun Belt
United States Military Academy (Army)	West Point, New York	1802	Federal (Military)	4,294	Black Knights	2024		Football	Patriot
Missouri State University	Springfield, Missouri	1905	Public	26,000	Bears	2025		Men's soccer	CUSA
United States Naval Academy (Navy)	Annapolis, Maryland	1845	Federal (Military)	4,400	Midshipmen	2015		Football	Patriot
Old Dominion University	Norfolk, Virginia	1930	Public	24,375	Monarchs	2020		Women's lacrosse	Sun Belt
Vanderbilt University	Nashville, Tennessee	1873	Nonsectarian	12,686	Commodores	2018		Women's lacrosse	SEC

=== Former full members ===
The American had seven former full members; all but one were public schools.

Institution	Location	Founded	Type	Nickname	Joined (Note: Represents the calendar year when fall sports competition begins.)	Left (Note: Represents the calendar year when spring sports competition ends.)	Colors	Current conference
Southern Methodist University (SMU)	University Park, Texas (Note: Mailing address is Dallas.)	1911	United; Methodist	Mustangs	2013	2024		ACC
University of Central Florida (UCF)	Orlando, Florida (Note: The main UCF campus has an Orlando mailing address, but is located in unincorporated Orange County.)	1963	Public	Knights	2013	2023		Big 12
University of Cincinnati	Cincinnati, Ohio	1819	Public	Bearcats	2013	2023		Big 12
University of Houston	Houston, Texas	1927	Public	Cougars	2013	2023		Big 12
Rutgers University	New Brunswick, New Jersey (Note: The university administration and the historic core campus are in New Brunswick. The athletic administration and almost all athletic facilities are in Piscataway and have a Piscataway mailing address. Small parts of the university's sub-campuses spill over into several adjacent communities.)	1766	Public	Scarlet Knights	2013	2014		Big Ten
University of Louisville	Louisville, Kentucky	1798	Public	Cardinals	2013	2014		ACC
University of Connecticut (UConn)	Storrs, Connecticut	1881	Public	Huskies	2013	2020		Big East (Note: For football, UConn is an FBS Independent.)

=== Former affiliate members ===
Six affiliate members have left the conference. Five other schools were affiliate members for one year before becoming full conference members.

Institution	Location	Founded	Nickname	Joined (Note: Represents the calendar year when fall sports competition begins.)	Left (Note: Represents the calendar year when spring sports competition ends.)	Colors	AAC sport	Primary conference	Conference in former AAC sport
University of Cincinnati	Cincinnati, Ohio	1819	Bearcats	2023 (Note: Measured from Cincinnati's departure from full membership.)	2024		Women's lacrosse	Big 12	
University of Florida	Gainesville, Florida	1853	Gators	2018	2024		Women's lacrosse	SEC	Big 12
Florida Atlantic University (FAU)	Boca Raton, Florida	1961	Owls	2022	2023		Men's soccer	American	
Florida Atlantic University (FAU)	Boca Raton, Florida	1961	Owls	2022	2023		Women's swimming & diving	American	
University of North Carolina at Charlotte (Charlotte)	Charlotte, North Carolina	1946	49ers	2022	2023		Men's soccer	American	
University of North Texas	Denton, Texas	1890	Mean Green	2022	2023		Women's swimming & diving	American	
Old Dominion University	Norfolk, Virginia	1930	Monarchs	2018	2024		Women's rowing	Sun Belt	Big 12
Rice University	Houston, Texas	1912	Owls	2022	2023		Women's swimming (Note: Rice dropped diving from its women's aquatics program in 1991 and did not reinstate the discipline until 2024, after it had become a full conference member.)	American	
California State University, Sacramento	Sacramento, California	1947	Hornets	2014	2024		Women's rowing	Big West	MAC
San Diego State University	San Diego, California	1897	Aztecs	2014	2021		Women's rowing	Pac-12	Discontinued
University of Alabama at Birmingham (UAB)	Birmingham, Alabama	1969	Blazers	2022	2023		Men's soccer	American	
Villanova University	Villanova, Pennsylvania	1842	Wildcats	2013	2015		Women's rowing	Big East	CAA

== Sports ==
The American currently sponsors championship competition in 10 men's and 11 women's NCAA sanctioned sports. James Madison, Old Dominion, and Vanderbilt are affiliate members for women's lacrosse.

Under NCAA rules reflecting the large number of male scholarship participants in football and attempting to address gender equity concerns (see also Title IX), each member institution is required to provide more women's varsity sports than men's. (Note: Under NCAA Bylaw 20.9.4, all Division I schools are required to sponsor a minimum of seven men's and seven women's sports, or six men's and eight women's sports. Bylaw 20.9.7.1 imposes the latter requirement on FBS schools. FCS schools, under Bylaw 20.9.8.1, may use either requirement. This does not explicitly require that a school sponsor two more women's sports than men's sports. See "2012–13 NCAA Division I Manual" (PDF). NCAA.)

Sport	Men's	Women's
Baseball	10	–
Basketball	13	13
Cross country	12	13
Football	14	–
Golf	11	11
Lacrosse	–	7
Soccer	9	11
Softball	–	10
Swimming & Diving	–	9
Tennis	11	13
Track and Field (Indoor)	9	13
Track and Field (Outdoor)	10	13
Volleyball	–	13

=== Men's sponsored sports by school ===
School	Baseball	Basketball	Cross Country	Football	Golf	Soccer	Tennis	Track & Field (Indoor)	Track & Field (Outdoor)	Total
Charlotte	Yes	Yes	Yes	Yes	Yes	Yes (Note: Joined in 2022–23)	Yes	Yes	Yes	9
East Carolina	Yes	Yes	Yes	Yes	Yes	No	No (Note: ECU sponsored a men's tennis team until the 2019–20 season but discontinued the program after that year.)	Yes	Yes	7
Florida Atlantic	Yes	Yes	Yes	Yes	Yes	Yes	Yes	No	No	7
Memphis	Yes	Yes	Yes	Yes	Yes	Yes	Yes	Yes	Yes	9
North Texas	No	Yes	Yes	Yes	Yes	No	No	Yes	Yes	6
Rice	Yes	Yes	Yes	Yes	Yes	No	Yes	Yes	Yes	8
South Florida	Yes	Yes	Yes	Yes	Yes	Yes	Yes	Yes	Yes	9
Temple	No (Note: Temple sponsored a baseball team during the 2014 season but discontinued the program after that year.)	Yes	Yes	Yes	Yes	Yes	Yes	No	No	6
Tulane	Yes	Yes	Yes	Yes	No	No	Yes	No	Yes	6
Tulsa	No	Yes	Yes	Yes	No (Note: Tulsa will reinstate men's golf in 2026–27 after a 10-year absence.)	Yes	Yes	Yes	Yes	7
UAB	Yes	Yes	No	Yes	Yes	Yes	Yes	No	No	6
UTSA	Yes	Yes	Yes	Yes	Yes	No	Yes	Yes	Yes	8
Wichita State	Yes	Yes	Yes	No	Yes (Note: Wichita State dropped men's golf at the end of the 2025–26 season.)	No	Yes	Yes	Yes	7
Future members
James Madison	Yes	Yes	No	Yes	Yes	Yes	Yes	No	No	6
Affiliate members
Army (Note: Army and Navy continue to field most of their other sports in the NCAA Division I Patriot League.)				Yes						1
FIU						Yes				1
Missouri State						Yes				1
Navy				Yes						1
Totals	10	13	12	12+2	11	7+2	11	9	10	95+4
2028–29 Totals	11	14	12	13+2	12	8+2	12	9	10	101+4

Men's varsity sports not sponsored by the American which are played by conference schools:

School	Sport	Conference
Florida Atlantic	Swimming & Diving	ASUN
Memphis	Rifle (Note: Rifle is technically a men's sport, but men's, women's, and coed teams all compete against each other. Memphis and UAB both field coed teams.)	GARC
Temple	Rowing	Independent
UAB	Rifle	SoCon

=== Women's sponsored sports by school ===
Future full member James Madison is highlighted in blue in the "Affiliate members" section.

School	Basketball	Cross Country	Golf	Lacrosse	Soccer	Softball	Swimming & Diving	Tennis	Track & Field (Indoor)	Track & Field (Outdoor)	Volleyball	Total
Charlotte	Yes	Yes	Yes	Yes	Yes	Yes	No	Yes	Yes	Yes	Yes	10
East Carolina	Yes	Yes	Yes	Yes	Yes	Yes	Yes	Yes	Yes	Yes	Yes	11
Florida Atlantic	Yes	Yes	Yes	No	Yes	Yes	Yes (Note: Joined in 2022–23)	Yes	Yes	Yes	Yes	10
Memphis	Yes	Yes	Yes	No	Yes	Yes	No	Yes	Yes	Yes	Yes	9
North Texas	Yes	Yes	Yes	No	Yes	Yes	Yes	Yes	Yes	Yes	Yes	10
Rice	Yes	Yes	Yes	No	Yes	No	Yes (Note: Rice reinstated women's diving to its aquatics program in 2024–25 after an absence of more than 30 years.)	Yes	Yes	Yes	Yes	9
South Florida	Yes	Yes	Yes	Yes	Yes	Yes	No	Yes	Yes	Yes	Yes	9
Temple	Yes	Yes	No	Yes	Yes	No (Note: Temple sponsored a softball team during the 2014 season but discontinued the program after that year.)	No	Yes	Yes	Yes	Yes	9
Tulane	Yes	Yes	Yes	No	No	No	Yes	Yes	Yes	Yes	Yes	8
Tulsa	Yes	Yes	Yes	No	Yes	Yes	No	Yes	Yes	Yes	Yes	10
UAB	Yes	Yes	Yes	No	Yes	Yes	No	Yes	Yes	Yes	Yes	9
UTSA	Yes	Yes	Yes	No	Yes	Yes	No	Yes	Yes	Yes	Yes	9
Wichita State	Yes	Yes	No (Note: Wichita State dropped women's golf at the end of the 2025–26 season.)	No	No	Yes	No	Yes	Yes	Yes	Yes	7
Future members
James Madison	Yes	Yes	Yes	Yes	Yes	Yes	Yes (Note: Joined in 2025–26)	Yes	Yes	Yes	Yes	11
Affiliate members
FIU							Yes					1
James Madison				Yes			Yes					2
Liberty							Yes					1
Marshall							Yes					1
Old Dominion				Yes								2
Vanderbilt				Yes								1
Totals	13	13	11	4+3	11	10	5+4	13	13	13	13	120+7
2028–29 Totals	14	14	12	5+2	12	11	6+3	14	14	14	14	131+5

Women's varsity sports not sponsored by the American which are played by conference schools:

School	Sport(s)	Conference(s)
Florida Atlantic	Beach volleyball	CUSA (Note: FAU and UAB remain beach volleyball members of Conference USA after otherwise departing that conference.)
James Madison	Field hockey	MAC
Memphis	Rifle (Note: Rifle is technically a men's sport, but men's, women's, and coed teams all compete against each other. Memphis and UAB both field coed teams.)	GARC
South Florida	Sailing	SAISA
South Florida	Beach volleyball	CUSA
Temple	Fencing	NIWFA
Temple	Field hockey	Big East
Temple	Gymnastics	EAGL
Temple	Rowing	MAC
Tulane	Beach volleyball	CUSA
Tulane	Bowling	CUSA (Note: Tulane's former bowling home of the Southland Bowling League merged into CUSA after the 2022–23 season. The CUSA bowling league now includes all of the final SBL members except Stephen F. Austin, which dropped the sport after the 2024–25 season.)
Tulsa	Rowing	Big 12
UAB	Beach volleyball	CUSA
UAB	Bowling	MEAC
UAB	Rifle	SoCon
Wichita State	Bowling	CUSA

== Conference champions ==
Shared titles (ex: 2014 football, 2020 men's basketball) are counted as a full title for each co-champion.

Accurate as of June 14, 2023.

Full list of conference titles by school
School	Years in conference	Number of titles	Titles by sport	Sports played
UCF†	2013–2023	46	Baseball: 1 (1 regular season, 0 tournament); Women's basketball: 2 (1 regular season, 1 tournament); Football: 4 Women's golf: 3 Women's rowing: 5 Men's soccer: 4 (3 regular season, 1 tournament); Women's soccer: 5 (4 regular season, 1 tournament); Softball: 6 (3 regular season, 3 tournament); Men's tennis: 1 Women's tennis: 2 Women's track & field: 5 (3 indoor, 2 outdoor); Volleyball: 8 (5 regular season, 3 tournament)	16: Baseball; Men's basketball Women's basketball Women's cross country Football; Men's golf Women's golf Women's rowing Men's soccer Women's soccer Softball; Men's tennis Women's tennis Women's indoor track and field Women's outdoor track and field Volleyball
Houston†	2013–2023	41	Baseball: 5 (3 regular season, 2 tournament); Men's basketball: 6 (4 regular season, 2 tournament); Football: 1 Men's golf: 1 Women's golf: 3 Women's swimming & diving: 7 Men's track & field: 13 (7 indoor, 6 outdoor); Women's track & field: 4 (2 indoor, 2 outdoor); Volleyball: 1 (1 regular season, 0 tournament)	17: Baseball; Men's basketball Women's basketball Men's cross country Women's cross country Football; Men's golf Women's golf Women's soccer Softball; Women's swimming and diving Women's tennis Men's indoor track and field Men's outdoor track and field Women's indoor track and field Women's outdoor track and field Volleyball
SMU†	2013–2024	30	Men's basketball: 4 (2 regular season, 2 tournament); Women's cross country: 2 Men's golf: 2 Women's golf: 1 Women's rowing: 3 Men's soccer: 5 (2 regular season, 3 tournament); Men's swimming & diving: 3 Women's swimming & diving: 2 Men's tennis: 2 Women's tennis: 1 Women's track & field: 3 (1 indoor, 2 outdoor); Volleyball: 2 (2 regular season, 0 tournament)	16: Men's basketball Women's basketball Women's cross country Football; Men's golf Women's golf Women's rowing Men's soccer Women's soccer Men's swimming and diving Women's swimming and diving Men's tennis Women's tennis Women's indoor track and field Women's outdoor track and field Volleyball
Tulsa	2014–present	28	Men's basketball: 1 (1 regular season, 0 tournament); Men's cross country: 9 Women's cross country: 6 Men's soccer: 5 (1 regular season, 4 tournament); Softball: 4 (1 regular season, 3 tournament); Women's tennis: 3	17: (Note: Tulsa had 18 teams compete in AAC play from 2014–16 and 17 in all other years); Men's basketball Women's basketball Men's cross country Women's cross country Football; Men's golf (until 2015–16); Women's golf Women's rowing Men's soccer Women's soccer Softball; Men's tennis Women's tennis Men's indoor track and field Men's outdoor track and field Women's indoor track and field Women's outdoor track and field Volleyball
South Florida	2013–present	27	Baseball: 1 (0 regular season, 1 tournament); Women's basketball: 3 (2 regular season, 1 tournament); Men's golf: 5 Men's soccer: 2 (1 regular season, 1 tournament); Women's soccer: 6 (3 regular season, 3 tournament); Softball: 3 (3 regular season, 0 tournament); Men's tennis: 5 Women's tennis: 2	18: Baseball; Men's basketball Women's basketball Men's cross country Women's cross country Football; Men's golf Women's golf Men's soccer Women's soccer Softball; Men's tennis Women's tennis Men's indoor track and field Men's outdoor track and field Women's indoor track and field Women's outdoor track and field Volleyball
UConn†	2013–2020	26	Baseball: 1 (0 regular season, 1 tournament); Men's basketball: 1 (0 regular season, 1 tournament); Women's basketball: 14 (7 regular season, 7 tournament); Women's cross country: 1 Men's soccer: 1 (1 regular season, 0 tournament); Women's soccer: 4 (2 regular season, 2 tournament); Men's track & field: 2 (1 indoor, 1 outdoor); Women's track & field: 2 (2 indoor, 0 outdoor)	21: (Note: UConn had 20 teams compete in AAC play from 2013–18 and 21 from 2018–20); Baseball; Men's basketball Women's basketball Men's cross country Women's cross country Football; Men's golf Women's lacrosse (beginning in 2018–19); Women's rowing Men's soccer Women's soccer Softball; Men's swimming and diving Women's swimming and diving Men's tennis Women's tennis Men's indoor track and field Men's outdoor track and field Women's indoor track and field Women's outdoor track and field Volleyball
Cincinnati†	2013–2023	17	Baseball: 1 (0 regular season, 1 tournament); Men's basketball: 5 (3 regular season, 2 tournament); Football: 3 Women's soccer: 1 (0 regular season, 1 tournament); Men's swimming & diving: 2 Men's track & field: 1 (1 indoor, 0 outdoor); Women's track & field: 3 (1 indoor, 2 outdoor); Volleyball: 1 (1 regular season, 0 tournament)	18: (Note: Cincinnati had 19 teams compete in AAC play from 2018–20 and 18 in all other years); Baseball; Men's basketball Women's basketball Men's cross country Women's cross country Football; Men's golf Women's golf Women's lacrosse (beginning in 2018–19); Men's soccer (until 2019–20); Women's soccer Men's swimming and diving Women's swimming and diving Women's tennis Men's indoor track and field Men's outdoor track and field Women's indoor track and field Women's outdoor track and field Volleyball
East Carolina	2014–present	14	Baseball: 8 (5 regular season, 3 tournament); Women's basketball: 1 (0 regular season, 1 tournament); Men's swimming & diving: 4 Women's soccer: 1 (0 regular season, 1 tournament)	18: (Note: ECU had 19 teams compete in AAC play from 2014–18, 20 from 2018–20, 16 in 2020–21, and 18 in all other years); Baseball; Men's basketball Women's basketball Men's cross country Women's cross country Football; Men's golf Women's golf Women's lacrosse (beginning in 2018–19); Women's soccer Softball; Men's swimming and diving (until 2019–20); Women's swimming and diving (on hiatus in 2020–21); Men's tennis (until 2019–20); Women's tennis (on hiatus in 2020–21); Men's indoor track and field Men's outdoor track and field Women's indoor track and field Women's outdoor track and field Volleyball
Louisville†	2013–2014	9*	Baseball: 1 (1 regular season, 0 tournament); Men's basketball: 2 (1 regular season, 1 tournament), vacated Men's cross country: 1 Women's golf: 1 Women's rowing: 1 Men's soccer: 1 (1 regular season, 0 tournament); Softball: 1 (0 regular season, 1 tournament); Men's swimming & diving: 1 Women's swimming & diving: 1 Volleyball: 1 (1 regular season, 0 tournament)	21: Baseball; Men's basketball Women's basketball Men's cross country Women's cross country Football; Men's golf Women's golf Women's rowing Men's soccer Women's soccer Softball; Men's swimming and diving Women's swimming and diving Men's tennis Women's tennis Men's indoor track and field Men's outdoor track and field Women's indoor track and field Women's outdoor track and field Volleyball
Memphis	2013–present	9	Men's basketball: 1 (0 regular season, 1 tournament); Football: 2 Men's golf: 1 Women's soccer: 4 (1 regular season, 3 tournament); Women's tennis: 1	18: Baseball; Men's basketball Women's basketball Men's cross country Women's cross country Football; Men's golf Women's golf Men's soccer Women's soccer Softball; Men's tennis Women's tennis Men's indoor track and field Men's outdoor track and field Women's indoor track and field Women's outdoor track and field Volleyball
Wichita State	2017–present	9	Men's basketball: 1 (1 regular season, 0 tournament); Women's cross country: 1 Softball: 3 (2 regular season, 1 tournament); Men's track & field: 2 (0 indoor, 2 outdoor); Women's track & field: 1 (0 indoor, 1 outdoor); Volleyball: 1 (1 regular season, 0 tournament)	15: Baseball; Men's basketball Women's basketball Men's cross country Women's cross country Men's golf Women's golf Softball; Men's tennis Women's tennis Men's indoor track and field Men's outdoor track and field Women's indoor track and field Women's outdoor track and field Volleyball
Florida‡	2018–present	7	Women's lacrosse: 7 (3 regular season, 4 tournament)	1: Women's lacrosse
Tulane	2014–present	6	Baseball: 3 (1 regular season, 2 tournament); Football: 1 Women's golf: 1 Men's tennis: 1	14: Baseball; Men's basketball Women's basketball Men's cross country Women's cross country Football; Women's golf Women's swimming and diving Men's tennis Women's tennis Men's outdoor track and field Women's indoor track and field Women's outdoor track and field Volleyball
Charlotte	2023–present	5	Softball: 2 (1 regular season, 1 tournament); Women's Track and Field: 1 Men's Soccer: 1 Men's tennis: 1	18: Baseball; Men's basketball Women's basketball Men's cross country Women's cross country Football; Women's golf Men's golf Men's soccer Women's Soccer; Women's Lacrosse; Men's tennis Women's tennis Men's outdoor track and field Women's indoor track and field Women's outdoor track and field Softball; Volleyball
FIU‡	2022–present	2	Men's soccer: 2 (1 regular season, 1 tournament)	2: Men's soccer Women's swimming and diving
Temple	2013–present	2	Men's basketball: 1 (1 regular season, 0 tournament); Football: 1	15: (Note: Temple had 17 teams compete in AAC play in 2013–14, 14 from 2014–18, and 15 in all other years); Baseball (until 2013–14); Men's basketball Women's basketball Men's cross country Women's cross country Football; Men's golf Women's lacrosse (beginning in 2018–19); Women's rowing Men's soccer Women's soccer Softball (until 2013–14); Men's tennis Women's tennis Men's indoor track and field (until 2013–14); Men's outdoor track and field (until 2013–14); Women's indoor track and field Women's outdoor track and field Volleyball
James Madison‡	2022–present	1	Women's lacrosse: 1 (1 regular season, 0 tournament)	1: Women's lacrosse
Navy‡	2015–present	0	–	1: Football
Old Dominion‡	2018–present	0	–	2: (Note: Old Dominion had 1 team compete in AAC play from 2018–20 and 2 in all other years); Women's lacrosse Women's rowing (beginning in 2020–21)
Sacramento State‡	2015–present	0	–	1: Women's rowing
Vanderbilt‡	2018–present	0	–	1: Women's lacrosse
Rutgers†	2013–2014	0	–	19: Baseball; Men's basketball Women's basketball Men's cross country Women's cross country Football; Men's golf Women's golf Women's rowing Men's soccer Women's soccer Softball; Women's swimming and diving Women's tennis Men's indoor track and field Men's outdoor track and field Women's indoor track and field Women's outdoor track and field Volleyball
San Diego State†‡	2015–2021	0	–	1: Women's rowing
Villanova†‡	2013–2015	0	–	1 Women's rowing

*- Does not include vacated championships

†- No longer a member of the AAC

‡- Affiliate member

== NCAA national championships ==
No current American Conference member has won an NCAA team championship while a member of the conference. The only school to have won a fully recognized NCAA title while in the American, UConn, left for the Big East Conference in 2020. Several members have won national titles before joining the American. Another former member, SMU, won the 2023 equestrian title the year before it left for the ACC, but that sport does not yet have full NCAA recognition. Equestrian is recognized by the NCAA as part of its Emerging Sports for Women program, but championships are organized by the National Collegiate Equestrian Association (NCEA) instead of the NCAA.

Excluded from these lists are all national championships earned outside the scope of NCAA competition, including Division I FBS football titles, Inter-Collegiate Sailing Association titles, women's AIAW titles, NCEA titles, retroactive Helms Athletic Foundation titles, and ITA tennis titles.

=== Team championships won by current members ===
School	Total	Men	Women	Co-ed	Nickname	Most successful sport (Titles)
University of North Texas	4	4	0	0	Mean Green	Men's golf (4)
Temple University	3	1	2	0	Owls	Women's lacrosse (2)
University of South Florida	1	0	1	0	Bulls	Women's swimming (1)
Tulane University	1	1	0	0	Green Wave	Men's tennis (1)
University of Tulsa	1	0	1	0	Golden Hurricane	Women's golf (1)
Rice University	1	1	0	0	Owls	Baseball (1)
Wichita State University	1	1	0	0	Shockers	Baseball (1)
East Carolina University	0	0	0	0	Pirates	N/A
Florida Atlantic University	0	0	0	0	Owls	N/A
University of Alabama at Birmingham	0	0	0	0	Blazers	N/A
University of Memphis	0	0	0	0	Tigers	N/A
University of North Carolina at Charlotte	0	0	0	0	49ers	N/A
University of Texas at San Antonio	0	0	0	0	Roadrunners	N/A
Total	12	8	4	0		

=== Team championships won as American Conference members ===
Includes all titles won while a member of the American, whether or not the conference sponsored that sport at the time.

School	Total	Men	Women	Co-ed	Nickname	Most successful sport (Titles)
University of Connecticut (UConn)	7	1	6	0	Huskies	Women's basketball, field hockey (3 each)
Total	7	1	6	0		

=== Individual and relay championships by current members ===
School	Total	Men	Women	Co-ed	Nickname	Most successful sport (Titles)
University of South Florida	24	12	10	2 (Note: Both won by Michelle Scarborough in rifle. While Scarborough is a woman, rifle is considered a co-ed sport by the NCAA.)	Bulls	Women's swimming (10)
Temple University	17	17	0	0	Owls	Men's gymnastics (13)
Tulane University	14	14	0	0	Green Wave	Men's tennis (10)
University of Memphis	6	5	0	1 (Note: Won by Beth Tidmore in rifle. While Tidmore is a woman, rifle is considered a co-ed sport by the NCAA.)	Tigers	Men's outdoor track & field (3)
East Carolina University	4	4	0	0	Pirates	Men's swimming (4)
Wichita State University	3	3	0	0	Shockers	Men's outdoor track & field (2)
University of Tulsa	2	1	1	0	Golden Hurricane	Women's golf (1), Men's indoor track & field (1)
Total	70	56	11	3		

== Football ==
The conference began football during the 1991–92 season, and it was a founding member of the Bowl Championship Series. Previously, conference opponents operated on a two-year cycle, as a home-and-home series.

The conference previously did not have enough teams to form divisions, but it now does after Navy joined the conference in 2015. (Note: At the time Navy joined in football, the NCAA required 12 teams for a conference in order to conduct divisional play and stage a championship game that was exempt from the NCAA-imposed limit of 12 regular-season games. Effective with the 2016 season, a conference was allowed to conduct an "exempt" championship game with fewer than 12 members, as long as the conference either plays in two divisions or conducts a full round-robin schedule. Since the 2022 season, all FBS conferences have had full freedom to select the participants in their championship games, regardless of organization or scheduling.) When Navy joined in 2015 and the conference's divisions were created, Navy was placed in the West division along with Houston, Memphis, SMU, Tulane, and Tulsa. Teams play eight conference games a season. Since 2015, each team has played the other five teams in its own division, as well as three teams from the other division, operating in a four-year cycle ensuring that each school will play every conference opponent at home and on the road at least once in the four-year cycle. At the end of each regular season, the East division winner and the West division winner, as determined by final conference record, meet in the American Conference Football Championship Game, played at the home site of one of the division winners.

With the departure of UConn after the 2019 season, the divisions were affected by the reduction to an uneven number of teams. At the time, the American had no plan to add another team to rebalance divisions, so the conference eliminated the divisions. The championship game is now played by the two teams that achieved the best record in regular-season conference play. While the conference has had 14 football members since 2023, it has not split into divisions for football.

Like the conference itself, football experienced much transition through its history. In fact it was the main force behind such departures and expansion. In 2003, the BCS announced that it would adjust the automatic bids granted to its six founding conferences based on results from 2004 to 2007. With the addition of Cincinnati, Louisville, and South Florida in 2005, the conference retained its BCS automatic-qualifying status.

At one point, the 2007 South Florida Bulls football team was ranked No. 2 in the BCS rankings, but the team finished No. 21 in the final poll.

The 2009 Cincinnati Bearcats football team finished the regular season undefeated at 12–0, and the team was ranked No. 3 in the final BCS standings, barely missing the opportunity to play for the BCS National Championship. The conference overall was 9–7 (.563) in BCS bowl games, the third highest winning percentage among the AQ conferences.

In 2013, UCF became the first football conference champion in the AAC era. However, UCF that season received the conference's automatic BCS bid to the Fiesta Bowl.

The 2017 UCF Knights football team, a member of the American, was undefeated, but the team was not invited to the College Football Playoff. The team earned the Group of Five's second ever New Year's Six bowl bid and defeated Auburn in the Peach Bowl. The team claimed a national championship, which was recognized by the Colley Matrix, one of the NCAA-recognized selectors of the national champion in football.

In 2021, Cincinnati became the first Group of Five team ever to appear in the top four of the CFP rankings at any point of the season. The Bearcats went on to be the first G5 school to be selected to the College Football Playoff Semi-final, against Alabama in the Cotton Bowl, and also the only one in the CFP's four-team era. The CFP expanded to 12 teams in 2024 and will expand further to 24 in 2027.

In 2025, Tulane became the second-ever American-era member to be selected to the College Football Playoff.

=== All-time school and conference records ===
As of the 2025 NCAA Division I FBS football season. Conference wins and losses are since the formation of the American, inclusive of championship games.

Team	Overall				Conference			Bowl appearances	Conference championships
Team	W	L	T	Win %	W	L	Win %	Bowl appearances	Conference championships
Army	744	551	51	.572	9	0	1.000	11	1
Navy	756	605	57	.553	41	31	.569	25	0
Tulsa	649	542	27	.544	32	47	.405	23	0
UTSA	91	83	0	.523	11	5	.688	6	0
South Florida	182	163	0	.528	34	53	.391	12	0
East Carolina	469	457	12	.506	26	54	.325	22	0
North Texas	546	535	33	.505	6	10	.375	15	0
Memphis	551	541	33	.504	55	36	.604	17	1
UAB	176	197	2	.472	5	11	.313	6	0
Tulane	573	679	38	.459	35	47	.427	17	1
Temple	499	622	52	.448	40	49	.449	9	1
Florida Atlantic	128	164	0	.438	6	10	.375	5	0
Rice	497	657	32	.433	7	9	.438	14	0
Charlotte	51	111	0	.315	6	10	.375	1	0

=== Football champions ===
The American Championship Game pits the top two teams in the conference standings in a game held following the conclusion of the regular season. The site of the Championship Game is the home stadium of the team with the best overall conference record, with a series of tiebreakers used if needed to determine the host or either of the participants. In its first two seasons, the American awarded its championship to the team(s) with the best overall conference record. The conference split into two six-team divisions for football and first played its championship game in 2015. Through the 2019 season, the championship game involved the winners of each division and was hosted by the division champion with the best conference record. After UConn's 2020 departure, the conference reverted to a single-table format. This format continues even after the expansion to 14 teams in 2023.

While all of the current power conferences have announced they will eliminate their football championship games after the 2026 season, coinciding with the expansion of the CFP to 24 teams, no group conference has yet announced its plans for football championship games after 2026.

		Record		Ranking			
Year	Champions	Conference	Overall	AP	Coaches	Bowl result	Head coach
2013	UCF	8–0	12–1	#10	#12	W Fiesta Bowl 52–42 vs. Baylor^{†}	George O'Leary
2014	UCF	7–1	9–4	N/A	N/A	L St. Petersburg Bowl 27–34 vs. NC State	George O'Leary
2014	Cincinnati	7–1	9–4	N/A	N/A	L Military Bowl 17–33 vs. Virginia Tech	Tommy Tuberville
2014	Memphis	7–1	10–3	#25	#25	W Miami Beach Bowl 55–48 vs. BYU	Justin Fuente
2015	Houston	7–1	13–1	#8	#8	W Peach Bowl 38–24 vs. Florida State^{†}	Tom Herman
2016	Temple	7–1	10–3	#23	#24	L Military Bowl 26–34 vs. Wake Forest	Matt Rhule
2017	UCF	8–0	13–0	#6	#7	W Peach Bowl 34–27 vs. Auburn^{†}	Scott Frost
2018	UCF	8–0	12–1	#11	#12	L Fiesta Bowl 32–40 vs. LSU^{†}	Josh Heupel
2019	Memphis	7–1	12–2	#17	#17	L Cotton Bowl 39–53 vs. Penn State^{†}	Mike Norvell
2020	Cincinnati	6–0	9–1	#6	#6	L Peach Bowl 21–24 vs. Georgia^{†}	Luke Fickell
2021	Cincinnati	8–0	13–1	#4	#4	L Cotton Bowl 6–27 vs. Alabama^	Luke Fickell
2022	Tulane	7–1	12–2	#9	#9	W Cotton Bowl 46–45 vs. USC^{†}	Willie Fritz
2023	SMU	8–0	11–3	#22	#24	L Fenway Bowl, 14–23 vs. Boston College	Rhett Lashlee
2024	Army	8–0	11–1	#21	#21	W Independence Bowl, 27–6 vs. Louisiana Tech	Jeff Monken
2025	Tulane	7–1	10–2	#17	#18	L College Football Playoff First Round, 10–41 at Ole Miss^	Jon Sumrall

- ^{†} BCS or NY6 Bowl Game
- ^ College Football Playoff game

=== Rivalries ===
The American has many rivalries among its member schools, primarily in football. Some rivalries existed before the conference was established or began play in football. Recent conference realignments in 2005, 2013, and the early 2020s ended – or temporarily halted – many rivalries. Before their departure to other conferences, a number of former member schools held longtime rivalries within the conference.

==== Intra-conference rivalries ====
Rivalry name	Team 1	Team 2	Meetings	Most recent meeting	First meeting	Record	Current streak	Season(s) in American
Army–Navy Game (Note: Played as a non-conference game on the Saturday after the conference championship game.)	Army	Navy	126	Navy, 17–16 (2025)	Navy, 24–0 (1890)	64–55–7 (Navy)	2 (Navy)	2024–present
none	Florida Atlantic	South Florida	7	South Florida, 48–13 (2025)	South Florida, 51–10 (2002)	5–2 (South Florida)	2 (South Florida)	2023–present
Battle for the Bones	Memphis	UAB	18	UAB, 31–24 (2025)	Memphis, 28–7 (1997)	11–7 (UAB)	1 (UAB)	2023–present
none	North Texas	Rice	14	North Texas, 56–24 (2025)	North Texas, 33–17 (1988)	9–5 (North Texas)	4 (North Texas)	2023–present
none	North Texas	UTSA	14	North Texas, 55–17 (2025)	UTSA, 21–13 (2013)	8–6 (UTSA)	1 (North Texas)	2023–present
none	Rice	Tulsa	20	Tulsa, 42–10 (2023)	Tie, 0–0 (1937)	10–9–1 (Tulsa)	2 (Rice)	2023–present

==== Former intra-conference rivalries ====
Rivalry name	Team 1	Team 2	Meetings	Most Recent Meeting	First meeting	Record	Current streak	Season(s) in American	Current conference(s)
The Keg of Nails	Cincinnati	Louisville	54	Louisville, 24–7 (2022)	Cincinnati, 7–0 (1929)	30–23–1 (Cincinnati)	3 (Louisville)	2013	Big 12 (Cincinnati); ACC (Louisville)
none	Cincinnati	Memphis	37	Cincinnati, 49–10 (2020)	Memphis, 26–14 (1966)	23–14 (Memphis)	1 (Cincinnati)	2013–2022	Big 12 (Cincinnati); American (Memphis)
none	Cincinnati	UCF	11	Cincinnati, 20–11 (2025)	Cincinnati, 52–7 (2015)	6–5 (Cincinnati)	2 (Cincinnati)	2013–2022	Big 12 (both)
none	Houston	SMU	37	SMU, 77–63 (2022)	SMU, 27–16 (1975)	22–14–1 (Houston)	1 (SMU)	2013–2022	Big 12 (Houston); ACC (SMU)
none	Louisville	Memphis	43	Louisville, 24–17 (2013)	Memphis, 13–7 (1948)	24–19 (Louisville)	4 (Louisville)	2013	ACC (Louisville); American (Memphis)
Gansz Trophy	Navy	SMU	25	SMU, 59-14 (2023)	SMU, 20–7 (1930)	13–12 (Navy)	4 (SMU)	2015–2023	American (Navy); ACC (SMU)
Safeway Bowl	North Texas	SMU	42	SMU, 45–21 (2023)	SMU, 66–0 (1922)	36–6–1 (SMU)	5 (SMU)	2023	American (North Texas); ACC (SMU)
Mayor's Cup	Rice	SMU	90	SMU, 36–32 (2023)	Rice, 127–3 (1916)	49–41–1 (SMU)	1 (SMU)	2023	American (Rice); ACC (SMU)
none	Rutgers	Temple	39	Rutgers, 36–7 (2023)	Rutgers, 34–20 (1948)	24–15 (Rutgers)	7 (Rutgers)	2013	Big Ten (Rutgers); American (Temple)
War on I-4	South Florida	UCF	14	UCF, 46–39 (2022)	South Florida, 31–14 (2005)	8–6 (UCF)	6 (UCF)	2013–2022	American (South Florida); Big 12 (UCF)
Civil ConFLiCT	UCF	UConn	8	UCF, 49–17 (2021)	UCF, 62–17 (2013)	6–2 (UCF)	5 (UCF)	2013–2019	Big 12 (UCF); Independent (UConn)

Records as of the end of the 2025 season

=== Bowl games ===
Following the 2013 season, the BCS era came to a close and was replaced by the College Football Playoff. Originally, four teams played in two semifinal games, with the winners advancing to the College Football Playoff National Championship. Six bowl games known as the New Year's Six — the Rose Bowl, Sugar Bowl, Orange Bowl, Cotton Bowl, Fiesta Bowl, and Peach Bowl — rotated as hosts for the semifinal games, and hosted major bowls when they did not host semifinal games (access bowls).

Starting in 2024, the CFP expanded to 12 teams. In 2024, the four highest-ranked conference champions, as determined by the CFP selection committee, received first-round byes. This changed in 2025, with the four highest-ranked teams receiving byes regardless of conference affiliation or championship status. Throughout the 12-team era, the remaining eight teams have played first-round matches at the home fields of the higher seeds. The New Year's Six bowls rotate as hosts of the quarterfinals and semifinals, except for the Rose Bowl, which keeps its historic New Year's Day scheduling and thus always hosts a quarterfinal.

With the birth of the College Football Playoff, the American lost its automatic qualifying status for one of the major bowls. In the current format, one automatic qualifying spot is reserved for the highest-ranked team from the "Group of Six" (G6) conferences – the American, Conference USA, the Mid-American Conference, Mountain West Conference, Pac-12 Conference, and Sun Belt Conference. In 2024 and 2025, this spot went to the highest-ranked conference champion among this group; starting in 2026, it goes to the highest-ranked G6 team even if it did not win a conference championship.

Although the pick order usually corresponds to the conference standings, the bowls are not required to make their choices strictly according to the won-lost records; many factors influence bowl selections, especially the likely turnout of the team's fans. Picks are made after any applicable College Football Playoff selections. If a team is selected for one of the access bowls or playoff, the bowl with the No. 2 pick will have the first pick of the remaining teams in the conference.

American Conference bowl games
Date	Name	Location	Opposing conference
-	College Football Playoff (Note: From 2026, if an American Conference team is the highest-ranked Group of Six team by the CFP Selection Committee, it will take part in the College Football Playoff, even if it is not the conference champion.)	-	
Dec 27, 2025	Go Bowling Military Bowl	Annapolis, Maryland	ACC
Jan 2, 2026	Lockheed Martin Armed Forces Bowl	Fort Worth, Texas	Big 12 or C-USA
Dec 27, 2025	Wasabi Fenway Bowl	Boston, Massachusetts	ACC
Dec 24, 2025	Radiance Technologies Independence Bowl	Shreveport, Louisiana	Big 12
Up to four of the following
Dec 23, 2025	Scooter's Coffee Frisco Bowl	Frisco, Texas	Group of Five
Dec 23, 2025	Boca Raton Bowl	Boca Raton, Florida	Group of Five
Dec 17, 2025	StaffDNA Cure Bowl	Orlando, Florida	Group of Five
Dec 19, 2025	United Home Mortgage Gasparilla Bowl	Tampa, Florida	Group of Five
Dec 26, 2025	SERVPRO First Responder Bowl	Dallas, Texas	ACC or Big 12
Dec 19, 2025	Myrtle Beach Bowl	Conway, South Carolina	CUSA, MAC or Sun Belt
Dec 27, 2025	Isleta New Mexico Bowl	Albuquerque, New Mexico	MWC
Dec 29, 2025	Birmingham Bowl	Birmingham, Alabama	SEC

=== Head football coach compensation ===
The total pay of head coaches includes university and non-university compensation. This includes base salary, income from contracts, foundation supplements, bonuses and media and radio pay.

Conf. Rank	University	Head coach	Salary
1	Tulane University	Willie Fritz	$2,842,000
2	University of Texas - San Antonio	Jeff Traylor	$2,550,000
t-3	University of South Florida	Alex Golesh	$2,500,000
t-3	Temple University	Stan Drayton	$2,500,000
4	East Carolina University	Mike Houston	$2,355,804
t-5	University of Memphis	Ryan Silverfield	$1,900,000
t-5	University of Tulsa	Kevin Wilson	$1,900,000
6	United States Naval Academy	Brian Newberry	$1,600,000
t-7	University of Alabama Birmingham	Trent Dilfer	$1,300,000
t-7	University of North Texas	Eric Morris	$1,300,000
8	University of North Carolina at Charlotte	Biff Poggi	$1,000,000
9	Rice University	Mike Bloomgren	$926,208
10	Florida Atlantic University	Tom Herman	$700,000

Records as of the end of the 2022 season

=== Conference individual honors ===
Coaches and media of the American award individual honors at the end of each football season.

== Men's basketball ==
In June 2013, it was announced that the inaugural men's basketball tournament would take place at FedExForum in Memphis. FedExForum had previously hosted eight Conference USA basketball tournaments.

Even though the Big East Conference was meant to be a basketball-oriented conference, UConn, a member of the American, won the 2014 NCAA Division I men's basketball tournament (the first after the conferences split).

=== All-time school records by winning percentage ===
This list goes through the 2024-25 season.

No.	Team	Records	Win Pct.	Conference Tournament Championships	Conference Regular Season Championships	Final Fours	National Championships
1	Memphis	1,438–701	.672	2	2	3	0
2	Temple	2,011–1,165	.633	0	1	2	1
3	UAB	960–561	.631	2	0	0	0
4	Wichita State	1,691–1,279	.569	0	1	2	0
5	Tulsa	1,527–1,260	.548	0	1	0	0
6	Charlotte	934–823	.532	0	0	1	0
7	North Texas	1,300–1,377	.486	0	0	0	0
8	UTSA	634–674	.485	0	0	0	0
9	Tulane	1,308–1,388	.485	0	0	0	0
10	South Florida	706–837	.458	0	1	0	0
11	East Carolina	748–944	.442	0	0	0	0
12	Rice	1,202–1,544	.438	0	0	0	0
13	Florida Atlantic	466–642	.421	0	0	1	0

=== American Conference Men's Basketball NCAA Bids ===
This list goes through the 2023–24 season. Only current conference members are included. However, this list covers the entire histories of basketball at the listed institutions, not just their American Conference tenures.

Total bids	Bids as AAC member (Note: Starting with the 2013–14 season, which The American considers as the start of its competitive history (as opposed to its institutional history), with the following exceptions: East Carolina, Tulane, and Tulsa, whose first conference season was 2014–15.; Wichita State, whose first conference season was 2017–18.; Charlotte, Florida Atlantic, North Texas, Rice, UAB, and UTSA, whose first conference season was 2023–24.)	School	Last bid	Last R32	Last Sweet 16	Last Elite 8	Last Final 4	Last RU	Last Championship
33	2	Temple	2019	2013	2001	2001	1958		1938 (Note: Temple were the first NIT champions in 1938, one year before the inception of the NCAA Tournament. The Owls were retroactively recognized by the Premo-Porretta Power Poll and the Helms Athletic Foundation as the national champion for the 1937–38 season.)
28*	3	Memphis	2023	2022	2009	2008	2008	2008 (Note: Memphis has vacated all of its victories from the 2007–08 season. These 38 wins are not included in Memphis's all-time record.)	
17	1	UAB	2024	2015	2004	1982			
16	1	Tulsa	2016	2003	2000	2000			
16	2	Wichita State	2021	2017	2015	2013	2013		
11	0	Charlotte	2005	2001	1977	1977	1977		
4	0	Rice	1970		1954	1942			
4	0	North Texas	2021	2021					
4	0	UTSA	2011						
3	1	Florida Atlantic	2024	2023	2023	2023	2023		
3	0	South Florida	2012	2012					
3	0	Tulane	1995	1995					
2	0	East Carolina	1993						

=== Men's basketball champions ===
	Regular season					Tournament				
Year	Champions	Record	AP	Coaches'	Postseason	Champions	Record	AP	Coaches'	Postseason
2013–14 (Note: Does not include UConn's 2014 national title as an American Conference member.)	Louisville	31–6 (15–3)	#5	#9	Sweet 16	Louisville†	31–6	#5	#9	Sweet 16
2013–14	Cincinnati	27–7 (15–3)	#15	#22	Round of 32	Louisville†	31–6	#5	#9	Sweet 16
2014–15	SMU	27–7 (15–3)	#18	NR	Round of 64	SMU	27–7	#18	RV	Round of 64
2015–16	Temple	21–12 (14–4)	NR	NR	Round of 64	UConn	25–10	RV	RV	Round of 32
2016–17	SMU	30–4 (17–1)	#11	#23	Round of 64	SMU	30–4	#11	#23	Round of 64
2017–18	Cincinnati	30–4 (16–2)	#6	#12	Round of 32	Cincinnati	30–4	#6	#12	Round of 32
2018–19	Houston	33–4 (16–2)	#11	#12	Sweet 16	Cincinnati	28–7	#22	#24	Round of 64
2019–20	Cincinnati	20–10 (13–5)	NR	NR	Canceled (Note: 2020 NCAA Division I men's basketball tournament was canceled due to the COVID-19 pandemic)	Canceled				
2019–20	Houston	23–8 (13–5)	#22	#23	Canceled	Canceled				
2019–20	Tulsa	21–10 (13–5)	NR	NR	Canceled	Canceled				
2020–21	Wichita State	16–6 (11–2)	NR	NR	First 4	Houston	28–4	#6	#3	Final 4
2021–22	Houston	32–6 (15–3)	#15	#7	Elite 8	Houston	32–6	#15	#7	Elite 8
2022–23	Houston	33–4 (17–1)	#2	#6	Sweet 16	Memphis	26–9	#24	NR	Round of 64
2023–24	South Florida	25–8 (16–2)	NR	NR	NIT	UAB	23–12	NR	NR	Round of 64
2024–25	Memphis	29–6 (16–2)	#25	NR	Round of 64	Memphis	29–6	#25	NR	Round of 64

=== Intra-conference rivalries ===
The American has many rivalries among its member schools, some of which existed before the conference was established. Recent conference realignment in 2005 and 2013 ended – or temporarily halted – many rivalries. Before their departure to other conferences, a number of former member schools held longtime rivalries within the conference.

Rivalry Name	Team 1	Team 2	Meetings	Most Recent Meeting	First Meeting	Record	Current Streak
Battle for the Bones	Memphis	UAB	50	65–57, Memphis (2019)	53–51, Memphis (1984)	36–11 (Memphis)	2 (Memphis)
Tulsa–Wichita State Rivalry	Tulsa	Wichita State	140	81–63, Wichita State (2023)	32–30, Tulsa (1931)	77–63 (Wichita State)	3 (Wichita State)

Results as of the 2022–23 season.

== Women's basketball ==
In June 2013, it was announced that the inaugural women's basketball tournament would take place at the Mohegan Sun in Connecticut. Women's basketball teams have played a total of 20 times in the NCAA Division I women's basketball tournament (since 1982), with UConn winning three national championships as an American Conference member and 12 times in all under head coach Geno Auriemma since 1995. Women's national championship tournaments prior to 1982 were run by the AIAW.

=== All-time school records by winning percentage ===
This list goes through the 2016–17 season.

No.	Team	Records	Win Pct.	The American Tournament Championships	The American Regular Season Championships	Final Fours	National Championships
1	Memphis	781–590 (Note: Record since the 1972–73 season, considered by Memphis to be the start of its "modern era" of women's basketball.)	.570	0	0	0	0
2	Tulane	684–534	.562	0	0	0	0
3	Temple	806–653–3	.552	0	0	0	0
5	East Carolina	705–600	.540	1	0	0	0
6	South Florida	687–690	.499	1	1	0	0
7	Wichita State	571–647 (Note: Record since the 1976–77 season, considered by Wichita State to be the start of its "modern era" of Division I women's basketball.)	.469	0	0	0	0
8	Tulsa	326–544	.375	0	0	0	0

=== Women's basketball champions ===
	Regular season					Tournament				
Year	Champions	Record	AP	Coaches'	Postseason	Champions	Record	AP	Coaches'	Postseason
2013–14	UConn	40–0 (18–0)	#1	#1	NCAA Champion	UConn	40–0 (18–0)	#1	#1	NCAA Champion
2014–15	UConn	38–1 (18–0)	#1	#1	NCAA Champion	UConn	38–1 (18–0)	#1	#1	NCAA Champion
2015–16	UConn	38–0 (18–0)	#1	#1	NCAA Champion	UConn	38–0 (18–0)	#1	#1	NCAA Champion
2016–17	UConn	36–1 (16–0)	#1	#1	Final Four	UConn	36–1 (16–0)	#1	#1	Final Four
2017–18	UConn	36–1 (16–0)	#1	#1	Final Four	UConn	36–1 (16–0)	#1	#1	Final Four
2018–19	UConn	35–3 (16–0)	#2	#2	Final Four	UConn	35–3 (16–0)	#2	#3	Final Four
2019–20	UConn	28–3 (16–0)	#5	#6	Canceled	UConn	28–3 (16–0)	#5	#6	Canceled (Note: 2020 NCAA Division I women's basketball tournament was canceled due to the COVID-19 pandemic.)
2020–21	South Florida	19–4 (13–2)	#19	#18	Round of 32	South Florida	19–4 (13–2)	#19	#18	Round of 32
2021–22	UCF	26–4 (14–1)	#24	#24	Round of 32	UCF	26–4 (14–1)	#24	#24	Round of 32
2022–23	South Florida	27–7 (15–1)	NR	NR	Round of 32	East Carolina	23–10 (11–5)	NR	NR	Round of 64
2023–24	Tulsa	25–10 (13–5)	NR	NR	WBIT	Rice	19–15 (9–9)	NR	NR	Round of 64
2024–25	UTSA	26–5 (17–1)	NR	NR	WBIT	South Florida	23–11 (13–4)	NR	NR	Round of 64

== Facilities ==
Future members in green.

School	Football stadium	Capacity	Basketball arena	Capacity	Baseball stadium	Capacity
Army	Michie Stadium	35,647	Football-only member			
Charlotte	Jerry Richardson Stadium	15,300 (Note: Capacity to be expanded to 18,170 by 2027)	Dale F. Halton Arena	9,105	Hayes Stadium	3,000
East Carolina	Dowdy–Ficklen Stadium	51,000	Williams Arena at Minges Coliseum	8,000	Clark-LeClair Stadium	5,000
Florida Atlantic	Flagler Credit Union Stadium	30,000	Eleanor R. Baldwin Arena	3,161	FAU Baseball Stadium	2,000
James Madison	Bridgeforth Stadium	24,877	Atlantic Union Bank Center	8,500	Eagle Field at Veterans Memorial Park	1,200
Memphis	Simmons Bank Liberty Stadium	45,632	FedExForum (Note: Memphis splits its women's basketball schedule between FedExForum and the Elma Roane Fieldhouse, which seats 2,565.)	18,119	FedExPark	2,000
Navy	Navy–Marine Corps Memorial Stadium	34,000	Football-only member			
North Texas	DATCU Stadium	30,100	UNT Coliseum	10,032	Non-baseball school	
Rice	First Community Stadium	47,000 (Note: Capacity to be reduced to ~30,000 by 2028.)	Tudor Fieldhouse	5,208	Reckling Park	7,000
South Florida	Raymond James Stadium (Note: South Florida plans to move to a 35,000-seat on-campus stadium in 2027.)	69,218	Yuengling Center	10,411	USF Baseball Stadium	3,211
Temple	Lincoln Financial Field	67,594	Liacouras Center (Note: Temple splits its women's basketball schedule between the Liacouras Center and McGonigle Hall, which seats 3,900.)	10,206	Non-baseball school	
Tulane	Yulman Stadium	30,000	Devlin Fieldhouse	4,100	Turchin Stadium	5,000
Tulsa	Skelly Field at H. A. Chapman Stadium	30,000	Reynolds Center	8,355	Non-baseball school	
UAB	Protective Stadium	47,100	Bartow Arena	8,508	Regions Field (Note: UAB splits its baseball schedule between Regions Field and Young Memorial Field, which seats 1,000.)	8,500
UTSA	Alamodome	34,984 (Note: Normal capacity for UTSA games; expandable to 64,000.)	Convocation Center	4,080	Roadrunner Field	800
Wichita State	Non-football school (Note: Wichita State discontinued its football program following the 1986 season. The Shockers' football facility, Cessna Stadium (final football capacity 30,000), remained in use for decades as home to the Shockers' track & field program and also hosted football games for Wichita's Kapaun Mt. Carmel High School. The stadium was torn down in 2023, with a new track-specific facility, University Stadium, now standing on its site.)		Charles Koch Arena	10,506	Eck Stadium	7,851

== Financials ==
=== Conference distributions ===
The following table shows American Athletic Conference distributions during the fiscal year beginning 07-01-2024 ending 06-30-2025 as reported by ProPublica using Schedule A of the American Athletic Conference tax filing submitted on May 15, 2026.

Institution	2024–25 Distribution
East Carolina University	$12,641,594
University of South Florida	$12,449,901
University of Memphis	$11,987,360
Tulane University	$11,669,334
Temple University	$11,461,931
University of Tulsa	$11,207,833
Navy; Football-only member	$9,047,581
University of Texas at San Antonio	$6,917,118
University of North Texas	$6,887,698
Florida Atlantic University	$6,521,607
University of Alabama at Birmingham	$6,376,732
University of North Carolina at Charlotte	$6,321,708
Rice University	$6,190,345
Army; Football-only member	$3,876,900
Wichita State University; Non-football member	$3,212,282
Average for 12 Full Members Average for 3 Partial Members	$9,219,430 5,378,921

=== CNBC list of the most valuable American schools ===
Rankings as of December 19, 2025 (2024–2025 academic year)

American	NCAA	School	Valuation	Value Change	Revenue	Revenue Change
1	72	South Florida Bulls	$236 million	▲57%	$104 million	▲46%

=== Athletic department revenue by school ===
Total revenue includes ticket sales, contributions and donations, rights and licensing, student fees, school funds and all other sources including TV income, camp income, concessions, and novelties.

Total expenses includes coach and staff salaries, scholarships, buildings and grounds, maintenance, utilities and rental fees, recruiting, team travel, equipment and uniforms, conference dues, and insurance.

The following table shows institutional reporting to the United States Department of Education as shown on the DOE Equity in Athletics website for the 2023–24 academic year.

Institution	2023–24 Total Revenue from Athletics	2023–24 Total Expenses on Athletics
University of South Florida	$95,425,212	$95,425,212
Temple University	$70,320,170	$70,320,170
East Carolina University	$65,211,957	$63,575,819
Rice University	$64,414,381	$64,414,381
University of Memphis	$62,737,618	$62,737,618
University of North Texas	$53,633,725	$53,633,725
University of Texas at San Antonio	$48,689,117	$48,689,117
University of North Carolina at Charlotte	$47,156,982	$47,156,982
University of Tulsa	$46,084,367	$46,084,367
Florida Atlantic University	$45,319,502	$45,319,502
University of Alabama at Birmingham	$43,271,595	$42,655,846
Tulane University	$39,305,494	$39,305,494
Wichita State University; Non-football member	$34,302,596	$33,626,420

== Broadcasting and media rights ==
In March 2019, the conference announced a $1 billion, 12-year media rights deal with ESPN, under which the majority of AAC content will be aired on ESPN properties. Selected basketball games were sub-licensed to CBS Sports until 2022, and most Army and Navy home football games will take place on CBS Sports until 2027 and 2028, respectively, as both schools had a previous deal with CBS prior to joining The American. Content not aired on linear television will be exclusive to ESPN's subscription package ESPN+, but a larger number of events (including at least 40 football games and 65 men's basketball games per-season, including the conference semi-finals and championship) will air on ABC and ESPN's linear networks than under the previous contract. Over 1,000 conference sporting events are aired on ESPN+ per year, including every baseball, basketball, football, lacrosse, soccer, softball, tennis, and volleyball game hosted by a conference member (unless that game is being broadcast on one of ESPN's other networks). The conference golf, rowing, swimming and diving, and track and field championships are also aired on ESPN+.

== See also ==
- List of NCAA conferences
- Big East Conference (2013–present)
- Big East Conference (1979–2013)
- United States Naval Academy
