= 2023–24 UNLV Lady Rebels basketball team =

American college basketball season

2023–24 UNLV Lady Rebels basketball

Mountain West regular season and tournament champions

NCAA tournament, First Round
- Conference: Mountain West Conference

Ranking
- Coaches: No. 19
- AP: No. 20
- Record: 30–3 (17–1 Mountain West)
- Head coach: Lindy La Rocque (4th season)
- Assistant coaches: Roman Owen; Mia Bell; Karlie Burris
- Home arena: Cox Pavilion; Thomas & Mack Center

2023–24 Mountain West Conference women's basketball standings
	Conf.				Overall
Team	W		L	PCT	W		L	PCT
UNLV †	17	–	1	.944	30	–	3	.909
New Mexico	12	–	6	.667	21	–	11	.656
Wyoming	11	–	7	.611	18	–	15	.545
Nevada	10	–	8	.556	16	–	16	.500
Colorado State	10	–	8	.556	20	–	11	.645
San Diego State	10	–	8	.556	22	–	13	.629
Boise State	10	–	8	.556	21	–	14	.600
Air Force	8	–	10	.444	15	–	17	.469
Fresno State	7	–	11	.389	14	–	18	.438
Utah State	2	–	16	.111	5	–	25	.167
San Jose State	2	–	16	.111	7	–	24	.226
† 2024 Mountain West tournament winner

The 2023–24 UNLV Lady Rebels basketball team represented the University of Nevada, Las Vegas during the 2023–24 NCAA Division I women's basketball season. The Lady Rebels were led by fourth-year head coach Lindy La Rocque. They played their home games at the Cox Pavilion, attached to the Thomas & Mack Center on UNLV's main campus in Paradise, Nevada. They were a member of the Mountain West Conference.

== Offseason ==
=== Departures ===
UNLV Lady Rebels Departures
Name	Number	Pos.	Height	Year	Hometown	Reason for Departure
Essence Booker	24	G	5'8"	Senior	Las Vegas, NV	Graduated
Justice Ethridge	11	G	5'9"	Senior	Las Vegas, NV	Graduated
Keyana Wilfred	15	C	6'3"	Senior	Mitchell, NE	Graduated

=== Incoming transfers ===
UNLV Lady Rebels incoming transfers
Name	Num	Pos.	Height	Year	Hometown	Previous School
Macie James	20	F	5'11"	Junior	Fresno, CA	Oklahoma State

== Roster ==
2023–24 UNLV Lady Rebels women's basketball team
Players
Coaches

Pos.	#	Name	Height	Year	Previous school	Hometown
G	0	Ashley Scoffin	5 ft 7 in (1.7 m)	GS	Westview HS; Nebraska	Dallas, OR
F	1	Nneka Obiazor	5 ft 10 in (1.78 m)	Sr	Eden Prairie HS; Youngstown State	Eden Prairie, MN
G	2	Kenadee Winfrey	5 ft 11 in (1.8 m)	Jr	Canyon HS	Canyon, TX
G	3	Kiara Jackson	5 ft 7 in (1.7 m)	Jr	South Grand Prairie HS	Grand Prairie, TX
G	10	Jasmyn Lott	5 ft 8 in (1.73 m)	So	Frisco Memorial HS	Frisco, TX
G	12	Alyssa Durazo-Frescas	5 ft 7 in (1.7 m)	Jr	Mater Dei HS	Newport Beach, CA
G	14	Macy Spencer	5 ft 9 in (1.75 m)	Fr	Tompkins HS	Katy, TX
F	20	Macie James	5 ft 11 in (1.8 m)	Jr	San Joaquin Memorial HS; Oklahoma State	Fresno, CA
F	21	McKinna Brackens	6 ft 1 in (1.85 m)	Fr	Fairfield HS	Fairfield, TX
C	23	Desi-Rae Young	6 ft 1 in (1.85 m)	Sr	Desert Oasis HS	Las Vegas, NV
C	31	Erica Collins	6 ft 3 in (1.91 m)	So	Chino Hills HS	Chino Hills, CA
F	32	Meadow Roland	6 ft 2 in (1.88 m)	Fr	San Joaquin Memorial HS	Fresno, CA
G	33	Amarachi Kimpson	5 ft 8 in (1.73 m)	Fr	Little Elm HS	Little Elm, TX
F	44	Alyssa Brown	6 ft 1 in (1.85 m)	Jr	Sahuaro HS	Tucson, AZ

Head coach

- Lindy La Rocque (Stanford)

Assistant coach(es)

- Roman Owen (Southwestern Christian)
- Mia Bell (UNLV)
- Karlie Burris (Portland)

Legend

- (C) Team captain
- (S) Suspended
- (I) Ineligible
- (W) Walk-on
- Injured
- Current redshirt

Roster

== Schedule and results ==
Date time, TV	Rank^{#}	Opponent^{#}	Result	Record	Site (attendance) city, state
Exhibition
November 1, 2023*; 6:30 p.m.		Cal State Los Angeles	W 95–59		Cox Pavilion (702); Paradise, NV
Non-conference regular season
November 6, 2023*; 7:00 p.m., ESPN+		at Loyola Marymount	W 72–62	1–0	Gersten Pavilion (517); Los Angeles, CA
November 10, 2023*; 6:30 p.m., MWN/SSSEN		Charleston	W 85–60	2–0	Cox Pavilion (777); Paradise, NV
November 14, 2023*; 6:30 p.m., MWN/SSSEN		Utah Tech	W 100–67	3–0	Cox Pavilion (803); Paradise, NV
November 18, 2023*; 2:00 p.m., MWN/SSSEN		New Hampshire	W 93–30	4–0	Cox Pavilion (724); Paradise, NV
November 24, 2023*; 4:00 p.m., ESPN+		vs. UC Santa Barbara; The Dana on Mission Bay Thanksgiving Tournament	W 68–49	5–0	Jenny Craig Pavilion (161); San Diego, CA
November 25, 2023*; 4:00 p.m., ESPN+		at San Diego; The Dana on Mission Bay Thanksgiving Tournament	W 93–56	6–0	Jenny Craig Pavilion (223); San Diego, CA
November 29, 2023*; 5:00 p.m., ESPN+		at Northern Arizona	W 85–69	7–0	Rolle Activity Center (400); Flagstaff, AZ
December 2, 2023*; 5:00 p.m., MWN/SSSEN		Arizona	W 72–53	8–0	Thomas & Mack Center (3,953); Paradise, NV
December 9, 2023*; 12:00 p.m., ESPN+		at Oklahoma	W 92–76	9–0	Lloyd Noble Center (4,246); Norman, OK
December 16, 2023*; 10:00 p.m., FloHoops	No. 23	at Seton Hall	L 54–84	9–1	Walsh Gymnasium (522); South Orange, NJ
December 21, 2023*; 9:30 a.m., YES		at Fairleigh Dickinson	W 71–59	10–1	Stratis Arena (475); Hackensack, NJ
Mountain West regular season
December 30, 2023; 1:00 p.m., CBSSN		Utah State	W 108–68	11–1 (1–0)	Cox Pavilion (1,363); Paradise, NV
January 6, 2024; 12:00 p.m.		at Colorado State	W 83–78	12–1 (2–0)	Moby Arena (2,018); Fort Collins, CO
January 10, 2024; 6:30 p.m.	No. 25	San Jose State	W 91–55	13–1 (3–0)	Cox Pavilion (848); Paradise, NV
January 13, 2024; 12:00 p.m.	No. 25	at Air Force	W 76–64	14–1 (4–0)	Clune Arena (631); Colorado Springs, CO
January 17, 2024; 11:00 a.m.	No. 25	at San Diego State	W 67–60	15–1 (5–0)	Viejas Arena (2,908); San Diego, CA
January 20, 2024; 2:00 p.m.	No. 25	New Mexico	L 66–69	15–2 (5–1)	Cox Pavilion (1,188); Paradise, NV
January 24, 2024; 5:30 p.m.		at Boise State	W 84–63	16–2 (6–1)	ExtraMile Arena (1,058); Boise, ID
January 27, 2024; 2:00 p.m.		Nevada	W 92–47	17–2 (7–1)	Thomas & Mack Center (2,555); Paradise, NV
January 31, 2024; 6:30 p.m.		Wyoming	W 58–51	18–2 (8–1)	Cox Pavilion (2,059); Paradise, NV
February 3, 2024; 1:00 p.m.		at New Mexico	W 62–56	19–2 (9–1)	The Pit (6,018); Albuquerque, NM
February 10, 2024; 2:00 p.m.		at Fresno State	W 63–49	20–2 (10–1)	Save Mart Center; Fresno, CA
February 14, 2024; 6:30 p.m.		Colorado State	W 67–64	21–2 (11–1)	Cox Pavilion (958); Paradise, NV
February 17, 2024; 5:00 p.m.		Air Force	W 95–68	22–2 (12–1)	Thomas & Mack Center (1,908); Paradise, NV
February 21, 2024; 5:30 p.m.		at Wyoming	W 63–60 ^{OT}	23–2 (13–1)	Arena-Auditorium (2,261); Laramie, WY
February 24, 2024; 6:30 p.m., FS1		at Nevada	W 98–67	24–2 (14–1)	Lawlor Events Center (2,127); Reno, NV
February 28, 2024; 6:30 p.m.	No. 24т	Boise State	W 63–57	25–2 (15–1)	Cox Pavilion (1,044); Paradise, NV
March 2, 2024; 2:00 p.m.	No. 24т	San Diego State	W 100–41	26–2 (16–1)	Cox Pavilion (1,851); Paradise, NV
March 5, 2024; 5:00 p.m.	No. 23	at Utah State	W 104–44	27–2 (17–1)	Smith Spectrum (483); Logan, UT
Mountain West tournament
March 11, 2024; 12:00 p.m., MWN	(1) No. 21	vs. (9) Fresno State; Quarterfinals	W 83–35	28–2	Thomas & Mack Center; Paradise, NV
March 12, 2024; 5:00 p.m., MWN	(1) No. 21	vs. (5) Colorado State; Semifinals	W 62–52	29–2	Thomas & Mack Center; Paradise, NV
March 13, 2024; 7:30 p.m., CBSSN	(1) No. 21	vs. (7) San Diego State; Championship	W 66–49	30–2	Thomas & Mack Center (2,045); Paradise, NV
NCAA tournament
March 23, 2024*; 4:00 p.m., ESPNews	(10 A2) No. 20	vs. (7 A2) No. 24 Creighton; First Round	L 73–87	30–3	Pauley Pavilion (8,841); Los Angeles, CA
*Non-conference game. ^{#}Rankings from AP Poll. (#) Tournament seedings in parentheses. A2=Albany 2. All times are in Pacific Time.

== Rankings ==
Ranking movements Legend: ██ Increase in ranking ██ Decrease in ranking RV = Received votes т = Tied with team above or below
	Week																				
Poll	Pre	1	2	3	4	5	6	7	8	9	10	11	12	13	14	15	16	17	18	19	Final
AP	RV	RV	RV	RV	RV	23	RV	RV	RV	25	25	RV	RV	RV	RV	RV	24т	23	21	20	Not released
Coaches	RV	RV	RV	RV	RV	24	RV	RV	RV	25	23	RV	RV	25	RV	RV	24	23	19	19	

== See also ==
- 2023–24 UNLV Runnin' Rebels basketball team
