= 2024 Mountain West Conference women's basketball tournament =

American college basketball competition

- Classification: Division I
- Season: 2023–24
- Teams: 11
- Site: Thomas & Mack Center; Paradise, Nevada
- Champions: UNLV (3rd title)
- Winning coach: Lindy La Rocque (3rd title)
- Television: Stadium/MWN, CBSSN

2023–24 Mountain West Conference women's basketball standings
	Conf.				Overall
Team	W		L	PCT	W		L	PCT
UNLV †	17	–	1	.944	30	–	3	.909
New Mexico	12	–	6	.667	21	–	11	.656
Wyoming	11	–	7	.611	18	–	15	.545
Nevada	10	–	8	.556	16	–	16	.500
Colorado State	10	–	8	.556	20	–	11	.645
San Diego State	10	–	8	.556	22	–	13	.629
Boise State	10	–	8	.556	21	–	14	.600
Air Force	8	–	10	.444	15	–	17	.469
Fresno State	7	–	11	.389	14	–	18	.438
Utah State	2	–	16	.111	5	–	25	.167
San Jose State	2	–	16	.111	7	–	24	.226
† 2024 Mountain West tournament winner

The 2024 Mountain West Conference women's basketball tournament is the postseason women's basketball tournament for the Mountain West Conference. It is to be held March 10–13, 2024, at the Thomas & Mack Center on the campus of University of Nevada, Las Vegas, in Paradise, Nevada. The tournament champion will receive the conference's automatic bid to the NCAA tournament.

== Seeds ==
All 11 Mountain West schools will participate in the tournament. Teams are to be seeded by conference record with a tiebreaker system to seed teams with identical percentages. The top five teams will receive byes into the tournament quarterfinals. The remaining teams will play in the first round. Tie-breaking procedures remained unchanged since the 2020 tournament.

- Head-to-head record between the tied teams
- Record against the highest-seeded team not involved in the tie, going down through the seedings as necessary
- Higher NET

Seed	School	Conf	Tiebreaker(s)
1	UNLV	17–1	
2	New Mexico	12–6	
3	Wyoming	11–7	
4	Nevada	10–8	4–1 against Colorado State/San Diego State/Boise State
5	Colorado State	10–8	3–2 against Nevada/San Diego State/Boise State
6	Boise State	10–8	
7	San Diego State	10–8	
8	Air Force	8–10	
9	Fresno State	7–11	
10	San Jose State	2–16	
11	Utah State	2–16	

== Schedule ==
Game	Time	Matchup	Score	Television
First round – Sunday, March 10
1	2:00 pm	No. 8 Air Force vs. No. 9 Fresno State	44–62	Stadium
2	4:30 pm	No. 7 San Diego State vs. No. 10 San Jose State	72–51	Stadium
3	7:00 pm	No. 6 Boise State vs. No. 11 Utah State	85–42	Stadium
Quarterfinals – Monday, March 11
4	12:00 pm	No. 1 UNLV vs. No. 9 Fresno State	83–35	Stadium
5	2:30 pm	No. 4 Nevada vs. No. 5 Colorado State	54–65	Stadium
6	5:00 pm	No. 2 New Mexico vs. No. 7 San Diego State	56–67	Stadium
7	7:30 pm	No. 3 Wyoming vs. No. 6 Boise State	54–62	Stadium
Semifinals – Tuesday, March 12
8	5:00 pm	No. 1 UNLV vs. No. 5 Colorado State	62–52	Stadium
9	7:30 pm	No. 7 San Diego State vs. No. 6 Boise State	72–69	Stadium
Championship – Wednesday, March 13
10	7:30 pm	No. 1 UNLV vs. No. 7 San Diego State	66–49	CBSSN
Game times in PT. Rankings denote tournament seeding.

== Bracket ==
First round Sunday, March 10; Stadium/MWN
8	Air Force	42
9	Fresno State	62
7	San Diego State	72
10	San Jose State	51
6	Boise State	85
11	Utah State	49

Quarterfinals; Monday, March 11; Stadium/MWN
1	UNLV	83
9	Fresno State	35
4	Nevada	54
5	Colorado State	65
2	New Mexico	56
7	San Diego State	67
3	Wyoming	54
6	Boise State	62

Semifinals; Tuesday, March 12; Stadium/MWN
1	UNLV	62
5	Colorado State	52
7	San Diego State	72
6	Boise State	69

Championship; Wednesday, March 13; CBSSN
1	UNLV	66
7	San Diego State	49

* denotes overtime period
