= 2023–24 San Diego State Aztecs women's basketball team =

American college basketball season

2023–24 San Diego State Aztecs women's basketball
- Conference: Mountain West Conference
- Record: 22–13 (10–8 MW)
- Head coach: Stacie Terry-Hutson (11th season)
- Associate head coach: Kellie Lewis
- Assistant coaches: Jon Silver; Gregg Gottlieb; Mel Boscarino; Najé Murray
- Home arena: Viejas Arena

2023–24 Mountain West Conference women's basketball standings
	Conf.				Overall
Team	W		L	PCT	W		L	PCT
UNLV †	17	–	1	.944	30	–	3	.909
New Mexico	12	–	6	.667	21	–	11	.656
Wyoming	11	–	7	.611	18	–	15	.545
Nevada	10	–	8	.556	16	–	16	.500
Colorado State	10	–	8	.556	20	–	11	.645
San Diego State	10	–	8	.556	22	–	13	.629
Boise State	10	–	8	.556	21	–	14	.600
Air Force	8	–	10	.444	15	–	17	.469
Fresno State	7	–	11	.389	14	–	18	.438
Utah State	2	–	16	.111	5	–	25	.167
San Jose State	2	–	16	.111	7	–	24	.226
† 2024 Mountain West tournament winner

The 2023–24 San Diego State Aztecs women's basketball team represented San Diego State University during the 2023–24 NCAA Division I women's basketball season. The Aztecs, led by 11th-year head coach Stacie Terry-Hutson, played their home games at Viejas Arena in San Diego, California, as members of the Mountain West Conference.

== Previous season ==
The Aztecs finished the 2022–23 season 23–11, 12–6 in Mountain West play to finish in a three-way tie for third place. They defeated New Mexico in the quarterfinals of the Mountain West tournament, before falling to top-seeded and eventual tournament champions UNLV in the semifinals. They received an at-large bid into the WNIT, where they would be defeated by UC Irvine in the first round.

== Roster ==
2023–24 San Diego State Aztecs women's basketball team
Players
Coaches

Pos.	#	Name	Height	Year	Previous school	Hometown
G	0	Khylee Pepe	5 ft 11 in (1.8 m)	Jr	Bishop Montgomery High School	Long Beach, California
G	1	Erin Houpt	5 ft 6 in (1.68 m)	Jr	Mercer	Danville, Illinois
G	2	Ellie Chen	5 ft 5 in (1.65 m)	Fr	La Salle College Prep	South Pasadena, California
G	3	Alyssa Jackson	5 ft 11 in (1.8 m)	Fr	Vanden High School	Fairfield, California
G	4	Emaya Trahan	5 ft 6 in (1.68 m)	Sr	Bishop Montgomery High School	Los Angeles, California
G	5	Trinity Zamora	6 ft 0 in (1.83 m)	Fr	Piedmont High School	Oakland, California
G	10	Mia Davis	6 ft 0 in (1.83 m)	Fr	Dream City Christian	Phoenix, Arizona
G	11	Jazlen Green	5 ft 11 in (1.8 m)	Sr	California	Upland, California
G	13	Meghan Fiso	5 ft 10 in (1.78 m)	Sr	Michigan	Seattle, Washington
G	15	Jada Lewis	5 ft 9 in (1.75 m)	Sr	Portland State	Rocklin, California
G	20	Sarah Barcello	5 ft 11 in (1.8 m)	Sr	Marist	Phoenix, Arizona
G	22	Natalija Grizelj	5 ft 9 in (1.75 m)	So	Saint Francis High School	Sunnyvale, California
F	23	Kim Villalobos	6 ft 0 in (1.83 m)	Sr	Chaminade College Prep	Los Angeles, California
G	24	Abby Prohaska	5 ft 9 in (1.75 m)	Sr	Notre Dame	Liberty Township, Ohio
F	32	Adryana Quezada	5 ft 10 in (1.78 m)	Sr	Utah State	Frisco, Texas

Head coach

- Stacie Terry-Hutson (UT Arlington)

Assistant coach(es)

- Kellie Lewis (Boise State)
- Jon Silver (UCLA)
- Gregg Gottlieb (UCLA)
- Mel Boscarino (Dominican (CA))
- Najé Murray (Syracuse)

Legend

- (C) Team captain
- (S) Suspended
- (I) Ineligible
- (W) Walk-on
- Injured
- Current redshirt

Roster
Last update: March 9, 2024

== Schedule and results ==
Date time, TV	Rank^{#}	Opponent^{#}	Result	Record	Site (attendance) city, state
Non-conference regular season
November 6, 2023*; 5:00 pm, ESPN+		at Portland	L 58–72	0–1	Chiles Center (1,000); Portland, OR
November 10, 2023*; 6:00 pm, MW Network		California Baptist	L 68–76	0–2	Viejas Arena (2,333); San Diego, CA
November 13, 2023*; 6:00 pm, MW Network		UC Davis	W 77–68	1–2	Viejas Arena (1,111); San Diego, CA
November 18, 2023*; 2:00 pm, ESPN+		at Sacramento State	W 68–45	2–2	Hornets Nest (316); Sacramento, CA
November 21, 2023*; 6:00 pm, MW Network		Westcliff	W 64–42	3–2	Viejas Arena (1,484); San Diego, CA
November 25, 2023*; 1:00 pm, MW Network		Penn; San Diego Thanksgiving Classic	W 74–49	4–2	Viejas Arena (1,758); San Diego, CA
November 28, 2023*; 6:00 pm, MW Network		UC San Diego; San Diego Thanksgiving Classic	L 71–77 ^{OT}	4–3	Viejas Arena (1,023); San Diego, CA
December 1, 2023*; 11:00 am, MW Network		No. 3 Stanford	L 44–85	4–4	Viejas Arena (3,708); San Diego, CA
December 4, 2023*; 6:00 pm, MW Network		Cal State Los Angeles	W 76–71 ^{OT}	5–4	Viejas Arena (918); San Diego, CA
December 7, 2023*; 6:00 pm, ESPN+		at San Diego	W 67–63	6–4	Jenny Craig Pavilion (637); San Diego, CA
December 11, 2023*; 11:00 am, ESPN+		at Seattle	W 69–61	7–4	Redhawk Center (737); Seattle, WA
December 20, 2023*; 10:15 am		vs. Kennesaw State; West Palm Beach Classic	W 75–52	8–4	Rubin Arena (44); West Palm Beach, FL
December 21, 2023*; 8:00 am		vs. Florida Atlantic; West Palm Beach Classic	W 75–48	9–4	Rubin Arena (46); West Palm Beach, FL
Mountain West regular season
December 30, 2023; 1:00 pm, MW Network		Colorado State	W 74–71 ^{OT}	10–4 (1–0)	Viejas Arena (902); San Diego, CA
January 3, 2024; 5:30 pm, MW Network		at Air Force	L 63–71	10–5 (1–1)	Clune Arena (172); Colorado Springs, CO
January 7, 2024; 1:00 pm, CBSSN		Fresno State	W 77–70	11–5 (2–1)	Viejas Arena (918); San Diego, CA
January 10, 2024; 5:30 pm, MW Network		at Wyoming	L 55–72	11–6 (2–2)	Arena-Auditorium (2,060); Laramie, WY
January 13, 2024; 1:00 pm, MW Network		at Boise State	L 59–68	11–7 (2–3)	ExtraMile Arena (1,511); Boise, ID
January 17, 2024; 11:00 am, MW Network		No. 25 UNLV	L 60–67	11–8 (2–4)	Viejas Arena (2,908); San Diego, CA
January 20, 2024; 3:00 pm, FS1		San Jose State	W 63–51	12–8 (3–4)	Viejas Arena (1,473); San Diego, CA
January 24, 2024; 5:00 pm, MW Network		at Utah State	W 76–62	13–8 (4–4)	Smith Spectrum (287); Logan, UT
January 27, 2024; 1:00 pm, MW Network		Boise State	W 79–54	14–8 (5–4)	Viejas Arena (2,003); San Diego, CA
February 3, 2024; 12:00 pm, MW Network		at Colorado State	L 50–82	14–9 (5–5)	Moby Arena (2,434); Fort Collins, CO
February 7, 2024; 11:00 am, MW Network		New Mexico	W 60–53	15–9 (6–5)	Viejas Arena (4,206); San Diego, CA
February 10, 2024; 2:00 pm, MW Network		at San Jose State	W 63–62	16–9 (7–5)	Provident Credit Union Event Center (873); San Jose, CA
February 14, 2024; 6:30 pm, MW Network		at Nevada	L 71–72	16–10 (7–6)	Lawlor Events Center (1,428); Reno, NV
February 17, 2024; 12:00 pm, MW Network		Utah State	W 90–62	17–10 (8–6)	Viejas Arena (1,287); San Diego, CA
February 21, 2024; 6:00 pm, MW Network		Air Force	W 73–63	18–10 (9–6)	Viejas Arena (939); San Diego, CA
February 28, 2024; 6:00 pm, MW Network		at New Mexico	L 63–66	18–11 (9–7)	The Pit (5,261); Albuquerque, NM
March 2, 2024; 2:00 pm, MW Network		at No. 24 UNLV	L 41–100	18–12 (9–8)	Cox Pavilion (1,851); Paradise, NV
March 5, 2024; 6:00 pm, MW Network		Wyoming	W 58–55	19–12 (10–8)	Viejas Arena (1,937); San Diego, CA
Mountain West tournament
March 10, 2024; 4:30 pm, MW Network	(7)	vs. (10) San Jose State; First round	W 72–51	20–12	Thomas & Mack Center (–); Paradise, NV
March 11, 2024; 5:00 pm, MW Network	(7)	vs. (2) New Mexico; Quarterfinals	W 67–56	21–12	Thomas & Mack Center; Paradise, NV
March 12, 2024; 7:30 pm, MW Network	(7)	vs. (6) Boise State; Semifinals	W 72–69	22–12	Thomas & Mack Center (1,887); Paradise, NV
March 13, 2024; 8:30 pm, CBSSN	(7)	vs. (1) No. 21 UNLV; Championship	L 49–66	22–13	Thomas & Mack Center (2,045); Paradise, NV
*Non-conference game. ^{#}Rankings from AP Poll. (#) Tournament seedings in parentheses. All times are in Pacific.
