= 2023–24 San Jose State Spartans women's basketball team =

American college basketball season

2023–24 San Jose State Spartans women's basketball
- Conference: Mountain West Conference
- Record: 7–24 (2–16 MW)
- Head coach: April Phillips (2nd season)
- Assistant coaches: Emily Ben-Jumbo; Shannon Gholar; Jeff Hironaka
- Home arena: Provident Credit Union Event Center

2023–24 Mountain West Conference women's basketball standings
	Conf.				Overall
Team	W		L	PCT	W		L	PCT
UNLV †	17	–	1	.944	30	–	3	.909
New Mexico	12	–	6	.667	21	–	11	.656
Wyoming	11	–	7	.611	18	–	15	.545
Nevada	10	–	8	.556	16	–	16	.500
Colorado State	10	–	8	.556	20	–	11	.645
San Diego State	10	–	8	.556	22	–	13	.629
Boise State	10	–	8	.556	21	–	14	.600
Air Force	8	–	10	.444	15	–	17	.469
Fresno State	7	–	11	.389	14	–	18	.438
Utah State	2	–	16	.111	5	–	25	.167
San Jose State	2	–	16	.111	7	–	24	.226
† 2024 Mountain West tournament winner

The 2023–24 San Jose State Spartans women's basketball team represented San Jose State University during the 2023–24 NCAA Division I women's basketball season. The Spartans, led by second-year head coach April Phillips, played their home games at Provident Credit Union Event Center in San Jose, California, as members of the Mountain West Conference.

== Previous season ==
The Spartans finished the 2022–23 season 6–25, 3–15 in Mountain West play to finish in a tie for ninth place. They upset Air Force in the first round of the Mountain West tournament, before falling to Wyoming in the quarterfinals.

== Roster ==
2023–24 San Jose State Spartans women's basketball team
Players
Coaches

Pos.	#	Name	Height	Year	Previous school	Hometown
G	0	Sydni Summers	5 ft 5 in (1.65 m)	Fr	Centennial High School	Inglewood, California
PG	2	Sophia Jones	5 ft 8 in (1.73 m)	Sr	Cypress Bay High School	Miami, Florida
F	3	Nailea Nicholas	6 ft 1 in (1.85 m)	Sr	Northeastern Junior College	Fresno, California
G	4	Jyah LoVett	5 ft 8 in (1.73 m)	Fr	Bella Vista College Preparatory	San Gabriel, California
F	11	Marisa Davis-Jones	6 ft 1 in (1.85 m)	Jr	Washington	Surprise, Arizona
G	12	Jasmine Singleton	5 ft 7 in (1.7 m)	Sr	Eastern Arizona College	Goodyear, Arizona
G	13	Alyssa Malla	5 ft 5 in (1.65 m)	So	Independence High School	San Jose, California
G/F	15	Maya Anderson	6 ft 1 in (1.85 m)	Fr	Crestwood Preparatory College	Toronto, Ontario
G/F	21	Sofia Kelemeni	6 ft 0 in (1.83 m)	So	International School of Greece	Kavala, Greece
F	22	Kaliyah Dillard	6 ft 0 in (1.83 m)	Fr	Centennial High School	Las Vegas, Nevada
F	23	Alani Fluker	6 ft 1 in (1.85 m)	Sr	Brennan High School	San Antonio, Texas
F/C	24	Amhyia Moreland	6 ft 1 in (1.85 m)	Jr	Old Dominion	Charlotte, North Carolina
G	30	Sabrina Ma	5 ft 10 in (1.78 m)	So	St. Ignatius College Preparatory	San Francisco, California
F	31	Mia Grizelj	6 ft 2 in (1.88 m)	GS	Saint Mary's	Sunnyvale, California
F/C	32	Mame Ndoye	6 ft 3 in (1.91 m)	Fr	Dream City Christian School	Médina, Senegal
C	34	Semaj Smith	6 ft 6 in (1.98 m)	RS Sr	Arizona	Long Beach, California
F/C	44	Finau Tonga	6 ft 2 in (1.88 m)	Sr	Saint Mary's	Taylorsville, Utah

Head coach

- April Phillips (Xavier)

Assistant coach(es)

- Emily Ben-Jumbo (Loyola Marymount)
- Shannon Gholar (Cal State San Bernardino)
- Jeff Hironaka (Eastern Oregon)

Legend

- (C) Team captain
- (S) Suspended
- (I) Ineligible
- (W) Walk-on
- Injured
- Current redshirt

Roster
Last update: March 10, 2024

== Schedule and results ==
Date time, TV	Rank^{#}	Opponent^{#}	Result	Record	Site (attendance) city, state
Exhibition
November 1, 2023*; 7:00 pm		Cal State Monterey Bay	W 75–56	–	Provident Credit Union Event Center (–); San Jose, CA
Non-conference regular season
November 6, 2023*; 7:00 pm, MW Network		Santa Clara	L 47–55	0–1	Provident Credit Union Event Center (733); San Jose, CA
November 9, 2023*; 5:00 pm, NBCSBA		Bellarmine	W 81–65	1–1	Provident Credit Union Event Center (847); San Jose, CA
November 11, 2023*; 12:00 pm, MW Network		Cal Poly	W 61–56	2–1	Provident Credit Union Event Center (573); San Jose, CA
November 14, 2023*; 6:00 pm, ESPN+		at Montana State	L 49–62	2–2	Worthington Arena (1,401); Bozeman, MT
November 19, 2023*; 2:00 pm, ESPN+		at Loyola Marymount	W 61–53	3–2	Gersten Pavilion (483); Los Angeles, CA
November 24, 2023*; 12:00 pm		at California; Raising the B.A.R. Invitational	L 51–74	3–3	Haas Pavilion (617); Berkeley, CA
November 25, 2023*; 12:00 pm		vs. Winthrop; Raising the B.A.R. Invitational	L 49–56	3–4	Haas Pavilion (163); Berkeley, CA
November 27, 2023*; 5:00 pm, MW Network		Bethesda	W 122–28	4–4	Provident Credit Union Event Center (401); San Jose, CA
November 29, 2023*; 7:00 pm, ESPN+		at Cal State Fullerton	L 64–71	4–5	Titan Gym (231); Fullerton, CA
December 3, 2023*; 4:00 pm, ESPN+		at Hawaii	L 47–73	4–6	Stan Sheriff Center (–); Honolulu, HI
December 18, 2023*; 12:00 pm, ESPN+		at Cal State Northridge	W 70–53	5–6	Premier America Credit Union Arena (149); Northridge, CA
December 29, 2023*; 1:00 pm, ESPN+		at Saint Mary's	L 52–70	5–7	University Credit Union Pavilion (229); Moraga, CA
Mountain West regular season
January 3, 2024; 7:00 pm, NBCSBA		Fresno State	L 67–70	5–8 (0–1)	Provident Credit Union Event Center (405); San Jose, CA
January 6, 2024; 12:00 pm, MW Network		at Utah State	W 69–54	6–8 (1–1)	Smith Spectrum (330); Logan, UT
January 10, 2024; 6:30 pm, MW Network		at No. 25 UNLV	L 55–91	6–9 (1–2)	Cox Pavilion (848); Paradise, NV
January 13, 2024; 2:00 pm, MW Network		Nevada	L 57–64	6–10 (1–3)	Provident Credit Union Event Center (742); San Jose, CA
January 17, 2024; 7:00 pm, MW Network		Boise State	L 64–68	6–11 (1–4)	Provident Credit Union Event Center (566); San Jose, CA
January 20, 2024; 3:00 pm, FS1		at San Diego State	L 51–63	6–12 (1–5)	Viejas Arena (1,473); San Diego, CA
January 27, 2024; 12:00 pm, MW Network		at Colorado State	L 49–65	6–13 (1–6)	Moby Arena (8,083); Fort Collins, CO
January 31, 2024; 11:00 am, MW Network		New Mexico	L 54–65	6–14 (1–7)	Provident Credit Union Event Center (220); San Jose, CA
February 3, 2024; 1:00 pm, NBCSBA		Air Force	L 56–78	6–15 (1–8)	Provident Credit Union Event Center (505); San Jose, CA
February 7, 2024; 5:30 pm, MW Network		at Boise State	L 42–73	6–16 (1–9)	ExtraMile Arena (954); Boise, ID
February 10, 2024; 2:00 pm, MW Network		San Diego State	L 62–63	6–17 (1–10)	Provident Credit Union Event Center (873); San Jose, CA
February 14, 2024; 6:00 pm, MW Network		at New Mexico	L 51–72	6–18 (1–11)	The Pit (4,807); Albuquerque, NM
February 17, 2024; 2:00 pm, MW Network		at Fresno State	L 59–74	6–19 (1–12)	Save Mart Center (1,279); Fresno, CA
February 21, 2024; 6:00 pm, MW Network		Utah State	L 70–71	6–20 (1–13)	Provident Credit Union Event Center (723); San Jose, CA
February 24, 2024; 12:00 pm, MW Network		at Air Force	L 53–67	6–21 (1–14)	Clune Arena (485); Colorado Springs, CO
February 28, 2024; 7:00 pm, MW Network		Wyoming	L 73–88	6–22 (1–15)	Provident Credit Union Event Center (–); San Jose, CA
March 2, 2024; 2:00 pm, MW Network		Colorado State	W 68–56	7–22 (2–15)	Provident Credit Union Event Center (514); San Jose, CA
March 5, 2024; 6:30 pm, MW Network		at Nevada	L 65–82	7–23 (2–16)	Lawlor Events Center (1,222); Reno, NV
Mountain West tournament
March 10, 2024; 4:30 pm, MW Network	(10)	vs. (7) San Diego State; First round	L 51–72	7–24	Thomas & Mack Center (–); Paradise, NV
*Non-conference game. ^{#}Rankings from AP Poll. (#) Tournament seedings in parentheses. All times are in Pacific.
