= 2023–24 Boise State Broncos women's basketball team =

American college basketball season

2023–24 Boise State Broncos women's basketball

WNIT, First Round
- Conference: Mountain West Conference
- Record: 21–14 (10–8 MW)
- Head coach: Gordy Presnell (19th season)
- Assistant coaches: Heather Sower; Cariann Ramirez; Mike Petrino
- Home arena: ExtraMile Arena

2023–24 Mountain West Conference women's basketball standings
	Conf.				Overall
Team	W		L	PCT	W		L	PCT
UNLV †	17	–	1	.944	30	–	3	.909
New Mexico	12	–	6	.667	21	–	11	.656
Wyoming	11	–	7	.611	18	–	15	.545
Nevada	10	–	8	.556	16	–	16	.500
Colorado State	10	–	8	.556	20	–	11	.645
San Diego State	10	–	8	.556	22	–	13	.629
Boise State	10	–	8	.556	21	–	14	.600
Air Force	8	–	10	.444	15	–	17	.469
Fresno State	7	–	11	.389	14	–	18	.438
Utah State	2	–	16	.111	5	–	25	.167
San Jose State	2	–	16	.111	7	–	24	.226
† 2024 Mountain West tournament winner

The 2023–24 Boise State Broncos women's basketball team represented Boise State University during the 2023–24 NCAA Division I women's basketball season. The Broncos, led by 19th-year head coach Gordy Presnell, played their home games at ExtraMile Arena in Boise, Idaho, as members of the Mountain West Conference.

== Previous season ==
The Broncos finished the 2022–23 season 17–16, 11–7 in Mountain West play to finish in sixth place. They defeated Utah State in the first round of the Mountain West tournament, before falling to Colorado State in the quarterfinals.

== Roster ==
2023–24 Boise State Broncos women's basketball team
Players
Coaches

Pos.	#	Name	Height	Year	Previous school	Hometown
G	0	Tatum Thompson	6 ft 1 in (1.85 m)	So	Woodinville High School	Woodinville, Washington
G	1	Mya Hansen	5 ft 9 in (1.75 m)	So	Billings Central Catholic High School	Billings, Montana
G	2	Linsey Lovrovich	5 ft 9 in (1.75 m)	Jr	Peninsula High School	Gig Harbor, Washington
G	4	Dani Bayes	5 ft 11 in (1.8 m)	So	Sheldon College	Brisbane, Australia
G	5	Allie Hueckman	5 ft 10 in (1.78 m)	RS So	Burns High School	Burns, Oregon
G	11	Kaitlin Burgess	5 ft 8 in (1.73 m)	RS Sr	College of Southern Idaho	Auckland, New Zealand
G	12	Mary Kay Naro	5 ft 11 in (1.8 m)	Sr	Beaverton High School	Beaverton, Oregon
F	15	Alyssa Christensen	6 ft 3 in (1.91 m)	Jr	College of Southern Idaho	New Plymouth, Idaho
F	21	Sydney McQuietor	6 ft 2 in (1.88 m)	Sr	Boston College	Keller, Texas
F	22	Trista Hull	6 ft 2 in (1.88 m)	Jr	La Salle High School	Yakima, Washington
F	23	Elodie Lalotte	6 ft 1 in (1.85 m)	Sr	Orangewood Academy	Paris, France
G	24	Jayda Clark	5 ft 4 in (1.63 m)	Jr	Richland High School	Richland, Washington
G	30	Mackenzie Naro	5 ft 8 in (1.73 m)	Jr	Beaverton High School	Beaverton, Oregon
G	32	Natalie Pasco	5 ft 10 in (1.78 m)	So	San Ramon Valley High School	Danville, California
F	33	Abby Muse	6 ft 3 in (1.91 m)	Sr	Heritage High School	Brentwood, California

Head coach

- Gordy Presnell (Northwest Nazarene)

Assistant coach(es)

- Heather Sower (Boise State)
- Cariann Ramirez (Boise State)
- Mike Petrino (Montana State Billings)

Legend

- (C) Team captain
- (S) Suspended
- (I) Ineligible
- (W) Walk-on
- Injured
- Current redshirt

Roster
Last update: March 9, 2024

== Schedule and results ==
Date time, TV	Rank^{#}	Opponent^{#}	Result	Record	Site (attendance) city, state
Exhibition
November 3, 2023*; 6:30 pm		The Master's	W 82–58	–	ExtraMile Arena (–); Boise, ID
Non-conference regular season
November 6, 2023*; 6:30 pm, MW Network		College of Idaho	W 77–35	1–0	ExtraMile Arena (827); Boise, ID
November 13, 2023*; 6:30 pm, MW Network		Weber State	W 76–47	2–0	ExtraMile Arena (765); Boise, ID
November 15, 2023*; 6:30 pm, MW Network		UC Riverside	W 63–55	3–0	ExtraMile Arena (689); Boise, ID
November 20, 2023*; 6:30 pm, MW Network		Pepperdine	W 63–47	4–0	ExtraMile Arena (1,558); Boise, ID
November 24, 2023*; 5:00 pm, FloHoops		vs. Santa Clara; South Point Classic	L 52–62	4–1	South Point Arena (–); Enterprise, NV
November 25, 2023*; 7:30 pm, FloHoops		vs. Rutgers; South Point Classic	W 68–65	5–1	South Point Arena (–); Enterprise, NV
November 29, 2023*; 6:30 pm, MW Network		UC Davis	W 70–53	6–1	ExtraMile Arena (828); Boise, ID
December 3, 2023*; 3:00 pm, ESPN+		at Eastern Washington	L 43–64	6–2	Reese Court (729); Cheney, WA
December 6, 2023*; 6:30 pm, MW Network		Cal State Bakersfield	W 87–66	7–2	ExtraMile Arena (838); Boise, ID
December 9, 2023*; 2:00 pm, ESPN+		at BYU	L 50–65	7–3	Marriott Center (2,722); Provo, UT
December 12, 2023*; 12:00 pm, MW Network		Rocky Mountain	W 67–46	8–3	ExtraMile Arena (2,732); Boise, ID
December 20, 2023*; 5:00 pm, ESPN+		vs. UC San Diego; San Diego Winter Classic	L 56–62	8–4	Jenny Craig Pavilion (121); San Diego, CA
December 21, 2023*; 5:00 pm, ESPN+		at San Diego; San Diego Winter Classic	W 62–54	9–4	Jenny Craig Pavilion (203); San Diego, CA
Mountain West regular season
December 30, 2023; 12:30 pm, MW Network		at Wyoming	L 47–61	9–5 (0–1)	Arena-Auditorium (2,939); Laramie, WY
January 3, 2024; 6:30 pm, MW Network		Nevada	L 57–58	9–6 (0–2)	ExtraMile Arena (1,506); Boise, ID
January 6, 2024; 2:00 pm, MW Network		at New Mexico	W 64–56	10–6 (1–2)	The Pit (5,715); Albuquerque, NM
January 13, 2024; 2:00 pm, MW Network		San Diego State	W 68–59	11–6 (2–2)	ExtraMile Arena (1,511); Boise, ID
January 17, 2024; 8:00 pm, MW Network		at San Jose State	W 68–64	12–6 (3–2)	Provident Credit Union Event Center (566); San Jose, CA
January 20, 2024; 3:00 pm, MW Network		Utah State	W 76–41	13–6 (4–2)	ExtraMile Arena (1,578); Boise, ID
January 24, 2024; 6:30 pm, MW Network		UNLV	L 63–84	13–7 (4–3)	ExtraMile Arena (1,058); Boise, ID
January 27, 2024; 2:00 pm, MW Network		at San Diego State	L 54–79	13–8 (4–4)	Viejas Arena (2,003); San Diego, CA
January 31, 2024; 7:00 pm, MW Network		at Fresno State	W 60–50	14–8 (5–4)	Save Mart Center (150); Fresno, CA
February 7, 2024; 6:30 pm, MW Network		San Jose State	W 73–42	15–8 (6–4)	ExtraMile Arena (954); Boise, ID
February 10, 2024; 1:00 pm, MW Network		Wyoming	W 56–42	16–8 (7–4)	ExtraMile Arena (1,492); Boise, ID
February 14, 2024; 6:00 pm, MW Network		at Utah State	W 73–57	17–8 (8–4)	Smith Spectrum (287); Logan, UT
February 17, 2024; 2:00 pm, MW Network		at Nevada	L 65–68 ^{OT}	17–9 (8–5)	Lawlor Events Center (1,442); Reno, NV
February 21, 2024; 6:30 pm, MW Network		New Mexico	W 58–55	18–9 (9–5)	ExtraMile Arena (1,454); Boise, ID
February 24, 2024; 1:00 pm, MW Network		Fresno State	W 70–65	19–9 (10–5)	ExtraMile Arena (1,187); Boise, ID
February 28, 2024; 7:30 pm, MW Network		at No. 24 UNLV	L 57–63	19–10 (10–6)	Cox Pavilion (1,044); Paradise, NV
March 2, 2024; 2:00 pm, MW Network		Air Force	L 66–67	19–11 (10–7)	ExtraMile Arena (1,731); Boise, ID
March 5, 2024; 6:30 pm, MW Network		at Colorado State	L 50–64	19–12 (10–8)	Moby Arena (2,174); Fort Collins, CO
Mountain West tournament
March 10, 2024; 8:00 pm, MW Network	(6)	vs. (11) Utah State; First round	W 85–49	20–12	Thomas & Mack Center (–); Paradise, NV
March 11, 2024; 8:30 pm, MW Network	(6)	vs. (3) Wyoming; Quarterfinals	W 62–54	21–12	Thomas & Mack Center (2,683); Paradise, NV
March 12, 2024; 8:30 pm, MW Network	(6)	vs. (7) San Diego State; Semifinals	L 69–72	21–13	Thomas & Mack Center (1,887); Paradise, NV
WNIT
March 20, 2024*; 7:00 pm, ESPN+		at Montana; First Round	L 66–92	21–14	Dahlberg Arena (1,471); Missoula, MT
*Non-conference game. ^{#}Rankings from AP Poll. (#) Tournament seedings in parentheses. All times are in Mountain.
