= 2023–24 Air Force Falcons women's basketball team =

American college basketball season

2023–24 Air Force Falcons women's basketball
- Conference: Mountain West Conference
- Record: 15–17 (8–10 MW)
- Head coach: Chris Gobrecht (9th season)
- Associate head coach: Stacy McIntyre
- Assistant coaches: Caitlyn Sears; Nicole Heyn; Lauren Brocke
- Home arena: Clune Arena

2023–24 Mountain West Conference women's basketball standings
	Conf.				Overall
Team	W		L	PCT	W		L	PCT
UNLV †	17	–	1	.944	30	–	3	.909
New Mexico	12	–	6	.667	21	–	11	.656
Wyoming	11	–	7	.611	18	–	15	.545
Nevada	10	–	8	.556	16	–	16	.500
Colorado State	10	–	8	.556	20	–	11	.645
San Diego State	10	–	8	.556	22	–	13	.629
Boise State	10	–	8	.556	21	–	14	.600
Air Force	8	–	10	.444	15	–	17	.469
Fresno State	7	–	11	.389	14	–	18	.438
Utah State	2	–	16	.111	5	–	25	.167
San Jose State	2	–	16	.111	7	–	24	.226
† 2024 Mountain West tournament winner

The 2023–24 Air Force Falcons women's basketball team represented the United States Air Force Academy during the 2023–24 NCAA Division I women's basketball season. The Falcons, led by ninth-year head coach Chris Gobrecht, played their home games at Clune Arena in Colorado Springs, Colorado as members of the Mountain West Conference.

The Falcons finished the season 15–17, 8–10 in Mountain West play, to finish in eighth place. They were upset by ninth seed Fresno State in the first round of the Mountain West tournament.

== Previous season ==
The Falcons finished the 2022–23 season 13–18, 8–10 in Mountain West play, to finish in seventh place. They were upset by eighth seed San Jose State in the first round of the Mountain West tournament.

== Roster ==
2023–24 Air Force Falcons women's basketball team
Players
Coaches

Pos.	#	Name	Height	Year	Previous school	Hometown
G	0	Jordyn DeVaughn	5 ft 6 in (1.68 m)	Fr	Lone Star High School	Little Elm, TX
G	1	Alexis Cortez	5 ft 11 in (1.8 m)	Fr	Allen High School	Allen, TX
G	2	Milahnie Perry	5 ft 7 in (1.7 m)	So	Seffner Christian Academy	Tampa, FL
G	4	Madison Smith	5 ft 8 in (1.73 m)	Jr	Connell High School	Connell, WA
G	5	Taylor Britt	5 ft 7 in (1.7 m)	Sr	USAFA Prep	Columbia, SC
G	10	Jayda McNabb	5 ft 10 in (1.78 m)	Fr	USAFA Prep	Rapid City, SD
G	13	Keelie O'Hollaren	5 ft 10 in (1.78 m)	Fr	Lakeridge High School	Lake Oswego, OR
G	20	Clara Teigland	5 ft 10 in (1.78 m)	Fr	Treynor High School	Treynor, IA
G	22	Grace Walsh	5 ft 9 in (1.75 m)	Fr	USAFA Prep	Joliet, IL
F	23	Parker Brown	6 ft 0 in (1.83 m)	So	Mead High School	Spokane, WA
G	24	Marissa Hargrave	5 ft 8 in (1.73 m)	Fr	Andress High School	El Paso, TX
F	30	Dasha Macmillan	6 ft 0 in (1.83 m)	Sr	Grapevine High School	Colleyville, TX
F	31	Emily Adams	6 ft 0 in (1.83 m)	So	Bishop Fenwick High School	Lebanon, OH
G	40	Jo Huntimer	5 ft 7 in (1.7 m)	Jr	ʻIolani School	Honolulu, HI

Head coach

- Chris Gobrecht (USC)

Assistant coach(es)

- Stacy McIntyre (Kentucky)
- Caitlyn Sears (Southern Utah)
- Nicole Heyn (Texas A&M International)
- Lauren Brocke (Colorado State)

Legend

- (C) Team captain
- (S) Suspended
- (I) Ineligible
- (W) Walk-on
- Injured
- Current redshirt

Roster
Last update: March 9, 2024

== Schedule and results ==
Date time, TV	Rank^{#}	Opponent^{#}	Result	Record	Site (attendance) city, state
Non-conference regular season
November 6, 2023*; 5:00 p.m., MW Network		Denver	W 65–63	1–0	Clune Arena (549); Colorado Springs, CO
November 10, 2023*; 6:00 p.m., ESPN+		at Houston	L 61–99	1–1	Fertitta Center (935); Houston, TX
November 14, 2023*; 6:30 p.m., MW Network		Regis	W 78–68	2–1	Clune Arena (225); Colorado Springs, CO
November 17, 2023*; 7:00 p.m., MW Network		Army	W 83–61	3–1	Clune Arena (776); Colorado Springs, CO
November 24, 2023*; 5:30 p.m., ESPN+		at Hawaii; Rainbow Wahine Showdown	W 54–51	4–1	Stan Sheriff Center (1,493); Honolulu, HI
November 25, 2023*; 3:00 p.m.		vs. Washington; Rainbow Wahine Showdown	L 53–73	4–2	Stan Sheriff Center (–); Honolulu, HI
November 26, 2023*; 5:30 p.m.		vs. Idaho State; Rainbow Wahine Showdown	L 52–55	4–3	Stan Sheriff Center (–); Honolulu, HI
December 2, 2023*; 1:00 p.m., MW Network		No. 7 Colorado	L 58–74	4–4	Clune Arena (2,177); Colorado Springs, CO
December 5, 2023*; 6:30 p.m., MW Network		UCCS	W 61–56	5–4	Clune Arena (176); Colorado Springs, CO
December 9, 2023*; 1:00 p.m., MW Network		Northern Colorado	W 68–60	6–4	Clune Arena (210); Colorado Springs, CO
December 16, 2023*; 1:00 p.m., Altitude		Weber State	W 70–58	7–4	Clune Arena (214); Colorado Springs, CO
December 19, 2023*; 11:00 a.m., ACCNX		at Clemson	L 54–70	7–5	Littlejohn Coliseum (870); Clemson, SC
December 21, 2023*; 12:00 p.m., ESPN+		at SMU	L 44–75	7–6	Moody Coliseum (1,031); University Park, TX
Mountain West regular season
December 30, 2023; 3:00 p.m., MW Network		at Fresno State	L 49–59	7–7 (0–1)	Save Mart Center (1,109); Fresno, CA
January 3, 2024; 6:30 p.m., MW Network		San Diego State	W 71–63 ^{OT}	8–7 (1–1)	Clune Arena (172); Colorado Springs, CO
January 6, 2024; 1:00 p.m., MW Network		Wyoming	L 51–68	8–8 (1–2)	Clune Arena (511); Colorado Springs, CO
January 10, 2024; 7:30 p.m., MW Network		at Nevada	W 75–71	9–8 (2–2)	Lawlor Events Center (1,142); Reno, NV
January 13, 2024; 1:00 p.m., MW Network		No. 25 UNLV	L 64–76	9–9 (2–3)	Clune Arena (631); Colorado Springs, CO
January 17, 2024; 6:30 p.m., MW Network		at Colorado State	L 67–81	9–10 (2–4)	Moby Arena (1,248); Fort Collins, CO
January 24, 2024; 6:30 p.m., MW Network		at Wyoming	L 63–66	9–11 (2–5)	Arena-Auditorium (2,333); Laramie, WY
January 27, 2024; 1:00 p.m., MW Network		New Mexico	L 51–66	9–12 (2–6)	Clune Arena (688); Colorado Springs, CO
January 31, 2024; 6:30 p.m., Altitude 2		Colorado State	W 59–49	10–12 (3–6)	Clune Arena (305); Colorado Springs, CO
February 3, 2024; 2:00 p.m., NBCSBA		at San Jose State	W 78–56	11–12 (4–6)	Provident Credit Union Event Center (505); San Jose, CA
February 7, 2024; 6:30 p.m., MW Network		Nevada	L 56–62	11–13 (4–7)	Clune Arena (342); Colorado Springs, CO
February 10, 2024; 2:00 p.m., MW Network		at Utah State	W 78–72	12–13 (5–7)	Smith Spectrum (394); Logan, UT
February 14, 2024; 6:30 p.m., MW Network		Fresno State	L 68–74	12–14 (5–8)	Clune Arena (217); Colorado Springs, CO
February 17, 2024; 6:00 p.m., MW Network		at UNLV	L 68–95	12–15 (5–9)	Cox Pavilion (1,908); Paradise, NV
February 21, 2024; 7:00 p.m., MW Network		at San Diego State	L 63–73	12–16 (5–10)	Viejas Arena (939); San Diego, CA
February 24, 2024; 1:00 p.m., MW Network		San Jose State	W 67–53	13–16 (6–10)	Clune Arena (485); Colorado Springs, CO
February 28, 2024; 11:00 a.m., MW Network		Utah State	W 85–46	14–16 (7–10)	Clune Arena (1,050); Colorado Springs, CO
March 2, 2024; 2:00 p.m., MW Network		at Boise State	W 67–66	15–16 (8–10)	ExtraMile Arena (1,731); Boise, ID
Mountain West tournament
March 10, 2024; 3:00 p.m., MW Network	(8)	vs. (9) Fresno State; First round	L 44–62	15–17	Thomas & Mack Center (–); Paradise, NV
*Non-conference game. ^{#}Rankings from AP poll. (#) Tournament seedings in parentheses. All times are in Mountain.
