= 2023–24 Fresno State Bulldogs women's basketball team =

American college basketball season

2023–24 Fresno State Bulldogs women's basketball
- Conference: Mountain West Conference
- Record: 15–18 (7–11 MW)
- Head coach: Jaime White (10th season)
- Associate head coach: Mandi Carver
- Assistant coaches: Shannon Bush; Courtnay Pilypaitis; Jazmine Redmon
- Home arena: Save Mart Center

2023–24 Mountain West Conference women's basketball standings
	Conf.				Overall
Team	W		L	PCT	W		L	PCT
UNLV †	17	–	1	.944	30	–	3	.909
New Mexico	12	–	6	.667	21	–	11	.656
Wyoming	11	–	7	.611	18	–	15	.545
Nevada	10	–	8	.556	16	–	16	.500
Colorado State	10	–	8	.556	20	–	11	.645
San Diego State	10	–	8	.556	22	–	13	.629
Boise State	10	–	8	.556	21	–	14	.600
Air Force	8	–	10	.444	15	–	17	.469
Fresno State	7	–	11	.389	14	–	18	.438
Utah State	2	–	16	.111	5	–	25	.167
San Jose State	2	–	16	.111	7	–	24	.226
† 2024 Mountain West tournament winner

The 2023–24 Fresno State Bulldogs women's basketball team represented California State University, Fresno during the 2023–24 NCAA Division I women's basketball season. The Bulldogs, led by tenth-year head coach Jaime White, played their home games at the Save Mart Center in Fresno, California, as members of the Mountain West Conference.

== Previous season ==
The Bulldogs finished the 2022–23 season 10–23, 3–15 in Mountain West play to finish in a tie for ninth place. They were defeated by Nevada in the first round of the Mountain West tournament.

== Roster ==
2023–24 Fresno State Bulldogs women's basketball team
Players
Coaches

Pos.	#	Name	Height	Year	Previous school	Hometown
F	0	Elif Dila Bayrak	6 ft 1 in (1.85 m)	So	Çankaya	Ankara, Turkey
G	1	Taija Sta. Maria	5 ft 6 in (1.68 m)	Fr	Crestwood Preparatory College	Vaughan, Ontario
G	2	Keely Brown	5 ft 10 in (1.78 m)	Jr	Luella High School	Locust Grove, Georgia
G	10	Alannah Chatfield	5 ft 8 in (1.73 m)	RS Fr	Dandenong Rangers	Melbourne, Australia
G	11	Malaya LeSueur	5 ft 9 in (1.75 m)	Fr	Benson Polytechnic High School	Portland, Oregon
F	12	Sydney Dethman	6 ft 2 in (1.88 m)	Jr	Froid Medicine Lake High School	Froid, Montana
F	13	Maria Konstantinidou	6 ft 2 in (1.88 m)	Fr	Otto-Hahn-Gymnasium	Stuttgart, Germany
F	14	Tamia Stricklin	5 ft 11 in (1.8 m)	RS So	Seattle Prep	Renton, Washington
G	15	Maria Doreste	5 ft 8 in (1.73 m)	So	CB Islas Canarias	Las Palmas, Spain
F	22	Bineta Diatta	6 ft 1 in (1.85 m)	Jr	McLennan Community College	Saly, Senegal
F	23	Mia Jacobs	6 ft 2 in (1.88 m)	So	La Salle	Perth, Australia
F	30	Kylee Fox	5 ft 11 in (1.8 m)	Fr	Richland High School	Richland, Washington
G	32	Thea Mikkelsen	5 ft 9 in (1.75 m)	Jr	Long Beach State	Roskilde, Denmark
G	50	Deajanae Harvey	5 ft 6 in (1.68 m)	Sr	Palomar College	San Diego, California
G	54	Franka Wittenberg	5 ft 9 in (1.75 m)	So	Wolfpack Wolfenbüttel	Hildesheim, Germany

Head coach

- Jaime White (Southern Utah)

Assistant coach(es)

- Mandi Carver (Idaho State)
- Shannon Bush (Holy Cross)
- Courtnay Pilypaitis (Vermont)
- Jazmine Redmon (Gonzaga)

Legend

- (C) Team captain
- (S) Suspended
- (I) Ineligible
- (W) Walk-on
- Injured
- Current redshirt

Roster
Last update: March 10, 2024

== Schedule and results ==
Date time, TV	Rank^{#}	Opponent^{#}	Result	Record	Site (attendance) city, state
Exhibition
October 27, 2023*; 6:00 pm		La Verne	W 96–43	–	Save Mart Center (–); Fresno, CA
Non-conference regular season
November 6, 2023*; 5:00 pm, MW Network		Fresno Pacific	W 70–42	1–0	Save Mart Center (4,419); Fresno, CA
November 10, 2023*; 6:00 pm, MW Network		UC Merced	W 100–47	2–0	Save Mart Center (985); Fresno, CA
November 15, 2023*; 5:00 pm, MW Network		Pepperdine	W 74–55	3–0	Save Mart Center (–); Fresno, CA
November 18, 2023*; 7:00 pm, ESPN+		at Cal State Bakersfield	L 63–65	3–1	Icardo Center (720); Bakersfield, CA
November 21, 2023*; 6:00 pm, MW Network		Long Beach State	W 74–64	4–1	Save Mart Center (1,233); Fresno, CA
November 24, 2023*; 2:30 pm, ESPN+		at Grand Canyon; GCU Women's Basketball Classic	L 36–55	4–2	Global Credit Union Arena (513); Phoenix, AZ
November 25, 2023*; 12:00 pm		vs. Eastern Illinois; GCU Women's Basketball Classic	W 70–60	5–2	Global Credit Union Arena (114); Phoenix, AZ
November 29, 2023*; 6:00 pm, MW Network		Portland State	L 61–72	5–3	Save Mart Center (320); Fresno, CA
December 2, 2023*; 4:00 pm, MW Network		UC San Diego	W 71–52	6–3	Save Mart Center (341); Fresno, CA
December 6, 2023*; 2:00 pm, MW Network		Cal State Fullerton	L 68–77	6–4	Save Mart Center (320); Fresno, CA
December 9, 2023*; 2:00 pm, ESPN+		at Cal Poly	L 59–84	6–5	Mott Athletics Center (1,256); San Luis Obispo, CA
December 16, 2023*; 2:00 pm, MW Network		Sacramento State	W 68–47	7–5	Save Mart Center (2,722); Fresno, CA
December 20, 2023*; 11:00 am, ESPN+		vs. Arizona State; Jerry Colangelo Hall of Fame Series	L 76–80	7–6	Footprint Center (–); Phoenix, AZ
Mountain West regular season
December 30, 2023; 2:00 pm, MW Network		Air Force	W 59–49	8–6 (1–0)	Save Mart Center (1,109); Fresno, CA
January 3, 2024; 7:00 pm, MW Network/NBCSBA		at San Jose State	W 70–67	9–6 (2–0)	Provident Credit Union Event Center (405); San Jose, CA
January 7, 2024; 1:00 pm, CBSSN		at San Diego State	L 70–77	9–7 (2–1)	Viejas Arena (918); San Diego, CA
January 10, 2024; 6:00 pm, MW Network		Colorado State	L 55–61	9–8 (2–2)	Save Mart Center (1,070); Fresno, CA
January 13, 2024; 2:00 pm, MW Network		Utah State	W 90–64	10–8 (3–2)	Save Mart Center (1,032); Fresno, CA
January 20, 2024; 1:00 pm, MW Network		at Nevada	L 62–63	10–9 (3–3)	Lawlor Events Center (1,382); Reno, NV
January 24, 2024; 6:00 pm, MW Network		at New Mexico	L 77–84	10–10 (3–4)	The Pit (4,716); Albuquerque, NM
January 27, 2024; 1:00 pm, MW Network		Wyoming	L 47–69	10–11 (3–5)	Save Mart Center (1,167); Fresno, CA
January 31, 2024; 6:00 pm, MW Network		Boise State	L 50–60	10–12 (3–6)	Save Mart Center (150); Fresno, CA
February 3, 2024; 1:00 pm, MW Network		at Utah State	W 70–50	11–12 (4–6)	Smith Spectrum (455); Logan, UT
February 7, 2024; 5:30 pm, MW Network		at Colorado State	L 56–69	11–13 (4–7)	Moby Arena (1,333); Fort Collins, CO
February 10, 2024; 2:00 pm, MW Network		UNLV	L 49–63	11–14 (4–8)	Save Mart Center (–); Fresno, CA
February 14, 2024; 5:30 pm, MW Network		at Air Force	W 74–68	12–14 (5–8)	Clune Arena (217); Colorado Springs, CO
February 17, 2024; 2:00 pm, MW Network		San Jose State	W 74–59	13–14 (6–8)	Save Mart Center (1,279); Fresno, CA
February 21, 2024; 6:00 pm, MW Network		Nevada	W 57–45	14–14 (7–8)	Save Mart Center (1,163); Fresno, CA
February 24, 2024; 12:00 pm, MW Network		at Boise State	L 65–70	14–15 (7–9)	ExtraMile Arena (1,187); Boise, ID
March 2, 2024; 12:00 pm, MW Network		at Wyoming	L 51–62	14–16 (7–10)	Arena-Auditorium (2,860); Laramie, WY
March 5, 2024; 6:00 pm, MW Network		New Mexico	L 58–72	14–17 (7–11)	Save Mart Center (1,023); Fresno, CA
Mountain West tournament
March 10, 2024; 2:00 pm, MW Network	(9)	vs. (8) Air Force; First round	W 62–44	15–17	Thomas & Mack Center (–); Paradise, NV
March 11, 2024; 12:00 pm, MW Network	(9)	vs. (1) No. 21 UNLV; Quarterfinals	L 35–83	15–18	Thomas & Mack Center; Paradise, NV
*Non-conference game. ^{#}Rankings from AP Poll. (#) Tournament seedings in parentheses. All times are in Pacific.
