= 2023–24 Colorado State Rams women's basketball team =

College women's basketball season

2023–24 Colorado State Rams women's basketball
- Conference: Mountain West Conference
- Record: 20–11 (10–8 Mountain West)
- Head coach: Ryun Williams (12th season)
- Assistant coaches: Rico Burkett; Amber Cunningham; Kasondra McKay; Rachel Erickson
- Home arena: Moby Arena

2023–24 Mountain West Conference women's basketball standings
	Conf.				Overall
Team	W		L	PCT	W		L	PCT
UNLV †	17	–	1	.944	30	–	3	.909
New Mexico	12	–	6	.667	21	–	11	.656
Wyoming	11	–	7	.611	18	–	15	.545
Nevada	10	–	8	.556	16	–	16	.500
Colorado State	10	–	8	.556	20	–	11	.645
San Diego State	10	–	8	.556	22	–	13	.629
Boise State	10	–	8	.556	21	–	14	.600
Air Force	8	–	10	.444	15	–	17	.469
Fresno State	7	–	11	.389	14	–	18	.438
Utah State	2	–	16	.111	5	–	25	.167
San Jose State	2	–	16	.111	7	–	24	.226
† 2024 Mountain West tournament winner

The 2023–24 Colorado State Rams women's basketball team represented Colorado State University, based in Fort Collins in the U.S. state of Colorado, in the 2023–24 NCAA Division I women's basketball season. The Rams, led by twelfth-year head coach Ryun Williams, played their home games at Moby Arena and were members of the Mountain West Conference.

== Previous season ==
During the 2022–23 season, Colorado State went 20–12 (12–6 MW) to finish tied for third in the Mountain West standings with San Diego State and New Mexico. In the Mountain West tournament, they defeated Boise State in the quarterfinals before ultimately falling 56–65 against Wyoming in the semifinals. They qualified for the WNIT, where they were defeated in the first round by Northern Iowa, 76–88.

== Offseason ==
=== Departures ===
Name	No.	Pos.	Ht	Yr	Hometown	Reason for departure	Ref
Kiya Dorroh	1	F/G	6'1"	So.	Tucson, AZ	Transferred to UT Martin	
Destiny Thurman	2	G	5'7"	Gr.	Arlington, TX	Graduated	
Jess Moors	3	F/G	6'0"	So.	Auckland, New Zealand	Transferred to Nova Southeastern	
Petra Farkas	11	G/F	5'11"	Sr.	Kecskemét, Hungary	Graduated	
Clara Gomez	12	F	6'1"	So.	Sabadell, Spain	Transferred to New Hampshire	

=== Arrivals ===
Name	No.	Pos.	Ht	Yr	Hometown	Previous school	Ref
Avree Antony	3	G	5'10"	Fr.	Sun Prairie, WI	Sun Prairie West HS	
Jackie Carman	11	G	5'8"	Gr.	Twinsburg, OH	Wofford	
Ann Zachariah	12	F	6'2"	So.	Kerala, India	Howard College	

== Roster ==
2023–24 Colorado State Rams women's basketball team
Players
Coaches

Pos.	#	Name	Height	Year	Previous school	Hometown
F	0	Kendyll Kinzer	6 ft 1 in (1.85 m)	GS	Lewiston HS; Fresno State	Lewiston, ID
G	3	Avree Antony	5 ft 10 in (1.78 m)	Fr	Sun Prairie West HS	Sun Prairie, WI
G	4	McKenna Hofschild	5 ft 2 in (1.57 m)	GS	Prior Lake HS; Seton Hall	Prior Lake, MN
F	5	Jadyn Fife	6 ft 0 in (1.83 m)	RS Fr	Liberty Christian	North Richland Hills, TX
F	10	Joseana Vaz	6 ft 0 in (1.83 m)	Sr	N/A; Casper College	Praia, Cape Verde
G	11	Jackie Carman	5 ft 8 in (1.73 m)	GS	Hathaway Brown; Wofford	Twinsburg, OH
F	12	Ann Zachariah	6 ft 2 in (1.88 m)	So	Kansas State Life Prep; Howard College	Kerala, India
G	14	Marta Leimane	6 ft 0 in (1.83 m)	So	Riga 47th Secondary	Ventspils, Latvia
G	20	Sanna Strörm	6 ft 0 in (1.83 m)	Jr	Rig Luleå; Kansas	Luleå, Sweden
G	21	Taylor Ray	6 ft 0 in (1.83 m)	RS Fr	Highlands Ranch HS	Highlands Ranch, CO
F	22	Cali Clark	6 ft 3 in (1.91 m)	Sr	Cherry Creek HS	Centennial, CO
G	24	Sydney Mech	6 ft 2 in (1.88 m)	GS	Cherry Creek HS; Denver	Englewood, CO
G	30	Hannah Ronsiek	5 ft 11 in (1.8 m)	So	O'Gorman HS	Sioux Falls, SD
G	32	Cailyn Crocker	5 ft 9 in (1.75 m)	GS	Mater Dei HS; California	Cypress, CA
G	55	Meghan Boyd	5 ft 11 in (1.8 m)	GS	Eagle HS; Denver	Eagle, ID

Head coach

- Ryun Williams (South Dakota)

Assistant coach(es)

- Rico Burkett (North Dakota)
- Amber Cunningham (South Dakota)
- Kassondra McKay (Louisiana Tech)
- Rachel Erickson (Black Hills State)

Legend

- (C) Team captain
- (S) Suspended
- (I) Ineligible
- (W) Walk-on
- Injured
- Current redshirt

Roster
Last update: March 31, 2024

== Schedule ==
Date time, TV	Rank^{#}	Opponent^{#}	Result	Record	Site (attendance) city, state
Exhibition
11/02/2023*; 6:30 p.m.		UCCS	W 87-50		Moby Arena (1,010); Fort Collins, CO
Non-conference regular season
11/06/2023*; 5:30 p.m.		Le Moyne	W 59-49	1–0	Moby Arena (1,357); Fort Collins, CO
11/09/2023*; 6:30 p.m.		Alabama A&M	W 83-39	2-0	Moby Arena (1,052); Fort Collins, CO
11/15/2023*; 6:30 p.m.		New Hampshire	W 67-45	3-0	Moby Arena (1,040); Fort Collins, CO
11/21/2023*; 6:30 p.m.		South Dakota Mines	W 92-56	4-0	Moby Arena (1,330); Fort Collins, CO
11/26/2023*; 3:30 p.m.		at San Francisco	W 62-53	5-0	Chase Center; San Francisco, CA
11/30/2023*; 7:00 p.m., ESPN+		at UTEP	W 66–59	6–0	Don Haskins Center (1,487); El Paso, TX
12/05/2023*; 6:30 p.m.		High Point	W 93–61	7–0	Moby Arena (1,320); Fort Collins, CO
12/09/2023*; 7:00 p.m.		at Montana	W 78–69	8–0	Dahlberg Arena (2,411); Missoula, MT
12/15/2023*; 7:00 p.m.		at Long Beach State; The Beach Classic	L 76–77	8–1	Walter Pyramid (637); Long Beach, CA
12/16/2023*; 8:00 p.m.		vs. UC Irvine; The Beach Classic	W 69–63	9–1	Walter Pyramid (834); Long Beach, CA
12/20/2023*; 5:30 p.m.		Mississippi State	L 75–82	9–2	Moby Arena (2,126); Fort Collins, CO
Mountain West regular season
12/30/2023; 2:00 p.m.		at San Diego State	L 71–74 ^{OT}	9-3 (0-1)	Viejas Arena (902); San Diego, CA
1/06/2024; 1:00 p.m.		UNLV	L 78-83	9-4 (0-2)	Moby Arena (2,018); Fort Collins, CO
1/10/2024; 7:00 p.m.		at Fresno State	W 61-55	10-4 (1-2)	Save Mart Center (1,070); Fresno, CA
1/13/2024; 1:00 p.m.		New Mexico	W 61-55	11-4 (2-2)	Moby Arena (1,488); Fort Collins, CO
1/17/2024; 6:30 p.m.		Air Force	W 81-67	12-4 (3-2)	Moby Arena (1,248); Fort Collins, CO
1/20/2024; 1:00 p.m.		at Wyoming; Border War	L 63-67	12-5 (3-3)	Arena-Auditorium (3,030); Laramie, WY
1/23/2024; 12:00 p.m.		at Nevada	L 51-78	12-6 (3-4)	Lawlor Events Center (6,999); Reno, NV
1/27/2024; 1:00 p.m.		San Jose State	W 65-49	13-6 (4-4)	Moby Arena (8,083); Fort Collins, CO
1/31/2024; 6:30 p.m.		at Air Force	L 49-59	13-7 (4-5)	Clune Arena (305); USAFA, CO
2/03/2024; 1:00 p.m.		San Diego State	W 82-50	14-7 (5-5)	Moby Arena (2,434); Fort Collins, CO
2/07/2024; 6:30 p.m.		Fresno State	W 69-56	15-7 (6-5)	Moby Arena (1,333); Fort Collins, CO
2/10/2024; TBA		at New Mexico	L 46-62	15-8 (6-6)	The Pit (5,103); Albuquerque, NM
2/14/2024; 7:30 p.m.		at UNLV	L 64-67	15-9 (6-7)	Cox Pavilion (958); Paradise, NV
2/17/2024; 12:30 p.m.		Wyoming; Border War	W 75-70	16-9 (7-7)	Moby Arena (8,083); Fort Collins, CO
2/24/2024; 1:00 p.m.		at Utah State	W 90-68	17-9 (8-7)	Smith Spectrum (301); Logan, UT
2/28/2024; 11:00 a.m.		Nevada	W 54-51	18-9 (9-7)	Moby Arena (6,536); Fort Collins, CO
3/02/2024; 3:00 p.m.		at San Jose State	L 56-68	18-10 (9-8)	Provident Credit Union Event Center (514); San Jose, CA
3/05/2024; 6:30 p.m.		Boise State	W 64-50	19-10 (10-8)	Moby Arena (2,174); Fort Collins, CO
Mountain West women's tournament
3/11/24; 3:30 p.m., MW Network	(5)	vs. (4) Nevada; Quarterfinals	W 65–54	20–10	Thomas & Mack Center; Paradise, NV
3/12/24; 6:00 p.m., MW Network	(5)	vs. (1) No. 21 UNLV; Semifinals	L 52–62	20–11	Thomas & Mack Center; Paradise, NV
*Non-conference game. ^{#}Rankings from AP poll. (#) Tournament seedings in parentheses. All times are in Mountain Time.

== See also ==
- 2023–24 Colorado State Rams men's basketball team
