= 2023–24 Oklahoma Sooners women's basketball team =

Intercollegiate basketball season

2023–24 Oklahoma Sooners women's basketball

Big 12 regular season champions

NCAA tournament, Second Round
- Conference: Big 12 Conference

Ranking
- Coaches: No. 20
- AP: No. 21
- Record: 23–10 (15–3 Big 12)
- Head coach: Jennie Baranczyk (3rd season)
- Assistant coaches: Shannon Gage; Michael Neal; Terry Smith
- Home arena: Lloyd Noble Center

2023–24 Big 12 Conference women's basketball standings
	Conf.				Overall
Team	W		L	PCT	W		L	PCT
No. 21 Oklahoma	15	–	3	.833	23	–	10	.697
No. 7 Texas †	14	–	4	.778	33	–	5	.868
No. 19 Kansas State	13	–	5	.722	26	–	8	.765
No. 25 Iowa State	12	–	6	.667	21	–	12	.636
No. 13 Baylor	12	–	6	.667	26	–	8	.765
No. 24 West Virginia	12	–	6	.667	25	–	8	.758
Kansas	11	–	7	.611	20	–	13	.606
Oklahoma State	7	–	11	.389	14	–	16	.467
TCU	6	–	12	.333	21	–	12	.636
BYU	6	–	12	.333	16	–	17	.485
Cincinnati	5	–	13	.278	14	–	18	.438
Texas Tech	5	–	13	.278	17	–	16	.515
Houston	5	–	13	.278	14	–	16	.467
UCF	3	–	15	.167	12	–	17	.414
† 2024 Big 12 tournament winner Rankings from AP poll

The 2023–24 Oklahoma Sooners women's basketball team represented the University of Oklahoma during the 2023–24 NCAA Division I women's basketball season. The Sooners, were led by third-year head coach Jennie Baranczyk and played their home games at the Lloyd Noble Center as members of the Big 12 Conference.

The Sooners were the Big 12 regular season champions and made it to the NCAA tournament as at-large before losing in the Round of 32. This season was the last season in the Big 12 Conference for Oklahoma as they joined the SEC on July 1, 2024.

== Previous season ==
The Sooners finished the season 26–7, 14–4 in Big 12 play to win the Big 12 regular season title with Texas. As No. 2 seed in the Big 12 women's tournament, the Sooners defeated TCU in the quarterfinals before losing Iowa State in the semifinals. They received an at-large bid to the 2023 NCAA tournament as a 5th seed in the Greenville Region 1 where they defeated Portland in the first round before losing to UCLA in the second round.

== Offseason ==
=== Departures ===
Departures
Name	Number	Pos.	Height	Year	Hometown	Reason for departure
Kelbie Washington	10	G	5'7"	Sophomore	Norman, OK	
Ana Llanusa	22	G	6'0"	(redshirt) Senior	Choctaw, OK	Graduated
Kaley Perkins	23	G	6'0"	Sophomore	Houston, TX	Transferred to Kent State
Madi Williams	25	G/F	6'0"	(redshirt) Senior	Fort Worth, TX	Graduated/2023 WNBA draft; selected 18th overall by Seattle Storm
Taylor Robertson	30	G	6'0"	(redshirt) Senior	MccPherson, KS	Graduated
Emma Svoboda	33	C	6'3"	Sophomore	La Qunita, CA	Transferred to UC San Diego

=== Incoming transfers ===
Incoming transfers
Name	Number	Pos.	Height	Year	Hometown	Previous school
Lexy Keys	15	G	5'7"	Senior	Tahlequah, OK	Oklahoma State

=== Recruits ===
==== 2023 recruiting class ====
College recruiting
Name	Hometown	School	Height	Weight	Commit date
Sahara Williams; W	Waterloo, IA	West High School	5 ft 10 in (1.78 m)	N/A	May 17, 2022
Sahara Williams; W	Recruit ratings: ESPN: (96)				
Landry Allen; C	Tuttle, OK	Tuttle High School	6 ft 3 in (1.91 m)	N/A	Jun 26, 2021
Landry Allen; C	Recruit ratings: No ratings found				
Overall recruit ranking:
Note: In many cases, Scout, Rivals, 247Sports, On3, and ESPN may conflict in their listings of height and weight.; In these cases, the average was taken. ESPN grades are on a 100-point scale.; Sources: "2023 Player Commits". ESPN. Archived from the original on December 14, 2023.

==== 2024 Recruiting Class ====
College recruiting (2024)
Name	Hometown	School	Height	Weight	Commit date
Zya Vann; G	Bethany, OK	Bethany High School	5 ft 9 in (1.75 m)	N/A	
Zya Vann; G	Recruit ratings: ESPN: (94)				
Caya Smith; W	Oklahoma City, OK	Putnam City West High School	6 ft 3 in (1.91 m)	N/A	
Caya Smith; W	Recruit ratings: ESPN: (92)				
Overall recruit ranking:
Note: In many cases, Scout, Rivals, 247Sports, On3, and ESPN may conflict in their listings of height and weight.; In these cases, the average was taken. ESPN grades are on a 100-point scale.; Sources: "2023 Player Commits". ESPN. Archived from the original on December 14, 2023.

== Roster ==
2023–24 Oklahoma Sooners women's basketball team
Players
Coaches

Pos.	#	Name	Height	Year	Previous school	Hometown
C	0	Beatrice Culliton	6 ft 3 in (1.91 m)	So	Saint Thomas Aquinas HS	Overland Park, KS
G	1	Nevaeh Tot	5 ft 3 in (1.6 m)	Sr	John Paul II HS	Columbus, OH
G	2	Reyna Scott	5 ft 10 in (1.78 m)	So	Nazareth Regional HS	New York, NY
G	4	Kennady Tucker	5 ft 10 in (1.78 m)	RS Sr	North Little Rock HS; North Carolina	Little Rock, AR
F	5	Kiersten Johnson	6 ft 4 in (1.93 m)	So	Duncanville HS	Carrollton, TX
G	11	Kayla Cooper	5 ft 9 in (1.75 m)	So	Plano East Senior HS	Plano, TX
G	12	Payton Verhulst	6 ft 1 in (1.85 m)	Jr	Bishop Miege HS	De Soto, KS
F	13	Jordan Moser	6 ft 1 in (1.85 m)	RS Sr	Loyola Academy; Loyola–Chicago	Norman, OK
G	15	Lexy Keys	5 ft 7 in (1.7 m)	Sr	Sequoyah HS; Oklahoma State	Tahlequah, OK
G	20	Aubrey Joens	5 ft 9 in (1.75 m)	Sr	Iowa City HS; Iowa State	Iowa City, IA
G	24	Skylar Vann	6 ft 0 in (1.83 m)	Sr	Deer Creek HS	Edmond, OK
F	25	Landry Allen	6 ft 3 in (1.91 m)	Fr	Tuttle HS	Tuttle, OK
F	32	Sahara Williams	5 ft 10 in (1.78 m)	Fr	West HS	Waterloo, IA
F	34	Liz Scott	6 ft 2 in (1.88 m)	RS Sr	Klein Oak HS	Tomball, TX

Head coach

- Jennie Baranczyk (Iowa)

Assistant coach(es)

- Shannon Gage (Missouri State)
- Michael Neal (Oklahoma)
- Terry Smith (Michigan State)

Legend

- (C) Team captain
- (S) Suspended
- (I) Ineligible
- (W) Walk-on
- Injured
- Current redshirt

Roster

== Schedule and results ==
Date time, TV	Rank^{#}	Opponent^{#}	Result	Record	Site (attendance) city, state
Exhibition
October 31, 2023*; 6:00 p.m., ESPN+		West Texas A&M	W 113–38		Lloyd Noble Center (902); Norman, OK
Non-conference regular season
November 6, 2023*; 12:00 p.m., ESPN+		Wichita State	W 92–68	1–0	Lloyd Noble Center (2,133); Norman, OK
November 9, 2023*; 6:00 p.m., SECN		at No. 12 Ole Miss	W 80–70	2–0	SJB Pavilion (2,030); Oxford, MS
November 12, 2023*; 2:00 p.m., ESPN+		Oral Roberts	W 103–74	3–0	Lloyd Noble Center (2,584); Norman, OK
November 15, 2023*; 10:30 a.m., ESPN+	No. 25	Alabama State	W 92–46	4–0	Lloyd Noble Center (8,939); Norman, OK
November 19, 2023*; 1:00 p.m., ACCN	No. 25	at Virginia	W 82–67	5–0	John Paul Jones Arena (4,198); Charlottesville, VA
November 23, 2023*; 2:00 p.m.	No. 22	vs. Princeton; Elevance Health Women's Fort Myers Tip-Off	L 63–77	5–1	Suncoast Credit Union Arena (512); Fort Myers, FL
November 25, 2023*; 12:30 p.m.	No. 22	vs. No. 19 Tennessee; Elevance Health Women's Fort Myers Tip-Off	L 73–76	5–2	Suncoast Credit Union Arena (478); Fort Myers, FL
December 1, 2023*; 6:00 p.m., ESPN+		Grambling State	W 103–69	6–2	Lloyd Noble Center (2,305); Norman, OK
December 9, 2023*; 2:00 p.m., ESPN+		UNLV	L 76–92	6–3	Lloyd Noble Center (4,246); Norman, OK
December 19, 2023*; 8:30 p.m., ESPN2		vs. No. 24 North Carolina; Jumpman Invitational	L 52–61	6–4	Spectrum Center (7,027); Charlotte, NC
December 22, 2023*; 12:00 p.m., ESPN+		Southern	L 70–79	6–5	Lloyd Noble Center (3,731); Norman, OK
Big 12 Conference regular season
December 30, 2023; 2:00 p.m., ESPN+		UCF	W 69–52	7–5 (1–0)	Lloyd Noble Center (3,835); Norman, OK
January 3, 2024; 8:00 p.m., ESPN+		at BYU	W 75–63	8–5 (2–0)	Marriott Center (1,748); Provo, UT
January 6, 2024; 12:00 p.m., ESPN+		Cincinnati	W 77–64	9–5 (3–0)	Lloyd Noble Center (3,126); Norman, OK
January 10, 2024; 6:00 p.m., ESPNU		at No. 12 Kansas State	L 57–74	9–6 (3–1)	Bramlage Coliseum (3,889); Manhattan, KS
January 13, 2024; 2:00 p.m., ESPN+		Texas Tech	W 73–55	10–6 (4–1)	Lloyd Noble Center (5,223); Norman, OK
January 20, 2024; 6:00 p.m., BIG12/ESPN+		at Houston	W 71–65	11–6 (5–1)	Fertitta Center (1,780); Houston, TX
January 24, 2024; 6:00 p.m., ESPNU		at No. 10 Texas	W 91–87	12–6 (6–1)	Moody Center (5,478); Austin, TX
January 27, 2024; 6:00 p.m., ESPN+		Kansas	W 60–55	13–6 (7–1)	Lloyd Noble Center (4,036); Norman, OK
January 31, 2024; 6:00 p.m., ESPN+		No. 2 Kansas State	W 66–63	14–6 (8–1)	Lloyd Noble Center (3,750); Norman, OK
February 3, 2024; 4:00 p.m., BIG12/ESPN+		at Oklahoma State; Bedlam Series	W 81–74	15–6 (9–1)	Gallagher-Iba Arena (5,326); Stillwater, OK
February 7, 2024; 6:00 p.m., ESPN+	No. 24	TCU	W 72–55	16–6 (10–1)	Lloyd Noble Center (3,241); Norman, OK
February 10, 2024; 6:00 p.m., BIG12/ESPN+	No. 24	at Iowa State	W 86–72	17–6 (11–1)	Hilton Coliseum (10,377); Ames, IA
February 14, 2024; 6:00 p.m., ESPN+	No. 23	No. 21 Baylor	W 84–73	18–6 (12–1)	Lloyd Noble Center (4,552); Norman, OK
February 17, 2024; 12:00 p.m., BIG12/ESPN+	No. 23	at No. 24 West Virginia	L 66–70	18–7 (12–2)	WVU Coliseum (3,715); Morgantown, WV
February 20, 2024; 5:00 p.m., BIG12/ESPN+	No. 23	at Cincinnati	W 95–87	19–7 (13–2)	Fifth Third Arena (1,347); Cincinnati, OH
February 24, 2024; 1:00 p.m., Fox	No. 23	Oklahoma State; Bedlam Series	W 91–56	20–7 (14–2)	Lloyd Noble Center (8,059); Norman, OK
February 28, 2024; 6:00 p.m., ESPN+	No. 20	No. 3 Texas	W 71–70	21–7 (15–2)	Lloyd Noble Center (6,378); Norman, OK
March 2, 2024; 4:00 p.m., BIG12/ESPN+	No. 20	at Kansas	L 74–83	21–8 (15–3)	Allen Fieldhouse (4,609); Lawrence, KS
Big 12 Conference Tournament
March 9, 2024; 1:30 p.m., ESPN+	(1) No. 19	vs. (9) TCU; Quarterfinals	W 69–53	22–8	T-Mobile Center (4,963); Kansas City, MO
March 11, 2024; 1:30 p.m., ESPN2	(1) No. 17	vs. (4) Iowa State; Semifinals	L 68–85	22–9	T-Mobile Center; Kansas City, MO
NCAA tournament
March 23, 2024*; 3:00 p.m., ESPNews	(5 A1) No. 18	vs. (12 A1) Florida Gulf Coast; First Round	W 73–70	23–9	Simon Skjodt Assembly Hall (12,753); Bloomington, IN
March 25, 2024*; 5:30 p.m., ESPN2	(5 A1) No. 18	at (4 A1) No. 14 Indiana; Second Round	L 65–78	23–10	Simon Skjodt Assembly Hall (12,385); Bloomington, IN
*Non-conference game. ^{#}Rankings from AP Poll. (#) Tournament seedings in parentheses. A1=Albany 1. All times are in Central Time.

== Rankings ==
Ranking movements Legend: ██ Increase in ranking ██ Decrease in ranking — = Not ranked RV = Received votes
	Week																				
Poll	Pre	1	2	3	4	5	6	7	8	9	10	11	12	13	14	15	16	17	18	19	Final
AP	—	25	22	RV	RV	—	—	—	—	—	—	—	RV	24	23	23	20	19	17	18	21
Coaches	23	21	20	RV	RV	RV	—	—	—	—	—	—	—	RV	25	25	22	21	20	21	20

== See also ==
- 2023–24 Oklahoma Sooners men's basketball team
