= 2023–24 Nevada Wolf Pack women's basketball team =

American college basketball season

2023–24 Nevada Wolf Pack women's basketball
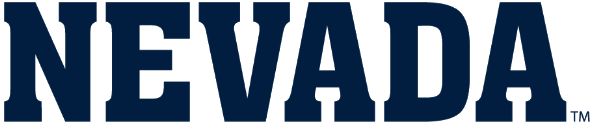
- Conference: Mountain West Conference
- Record: 16–16 (10–8 MW)
- Head coach: Amanda Levens (7th season)
- Assistant coaches: Laura Gonsalves; Ashley Elliott; Halie Bergman
- Home arena: Lawlor Events Center

2023–24 Mountain West Conference women's basketball standings
	Conf.				Overall
Team	W		L	PCT	W		L	PCT
UNLV †	17	–	1	.944	30	–	3	.909
New Mexico	12	–	6	.667	21	–	11	.656
Wyoming	11	–	7	.611	18	–	15	.545
Nevada	10	–	8	.556	16	–	16	.500
Colorado State	10	–	8	.556	20	–	11	.645
San Diego State	10	–	8	.556	22	–	13	.629
Boise State	10	–	8	.556	21	–	14	.600
Air Force	8	–	10	.444	15	–	17	.469
Fresno State	7	–	11	.389	14	–	18	.438
Utah State	2	–	16	.111	5	–	25	.167
San Jose State	2	–	16	.111	7	–	24	.226
† 2024 Mountain West tournament winner

The 2023–24 Nevada Wolf Pack women's basketball team represented the University of Nevada, Reno during the 2023–24 NCAA Division I women's basketball season. The Wolf Pack, led by seventh-year head coach Amanda Levens, played their home games at the Lawlor Events Center in Reno, Nevada, as members of the Mountain West Conference.

== Previous season ==
The Wolf Pack finished the 2022–23 season 10–21, 6–12 in Mountain West play to finish in eighth place. They defeated Fresno State in the first round of the Mountain West tournament, before falling to top-seeded and eventual tournament champions UNLV in the quarterfinals.

== Roster ==
2023–24 Nevada Wolf Pack women's basketball team
Players
Coaches

Pos.	#	Name	Height	Year	Previous school	Hometown
G	2	Izzy Sullivan	5 ft 10 in (1.78 m)	Fr	Eastside Catholic School	Sammamish, Washington
G	4	Audrey Roden	5 ft 9 in (1.75 m)	Jr	West Linn High School	West Linn, Oregon
G	5	Kaylee Borden	5 ft 6 in (1.68 m)	Jr	Anadarko High School	Anadarko, Oklahoma
G	10	Dymonique Maxie	5 ft 8 in (1.73 m)	Fr	Moreau Catholic High School	Hayward, California
PG	11	Victoria Davis	5 ft 4 in (1.63 m)	Sr	Hampton	Chicago, Illinois
G/F	13	Kaylen Banwareesingh	6 ft 1 in (1.85 m)	Sr	UMass Lowell	Bronx, New York
G	20	Rakiyah Jackson	5 ft 10 in (1.78 m)	Fr	Garfield High School	Seattle, Washington
G	21	Charlotte Climenhage	6 ft 0 in (1.83 m)	Fr	Folsom High School	Folsom, California
G	22	Claire Jacobs	6 ft 0 in (1.83 m)	Sr	La Salle	Perth, Australia
F	23	Lexie Givens	6 ft 0 in (1.83 m)	Sr	Alameda High School	Alameda, California
F	24	Kennedy Lee	6 ft 0 in (1.83 m)	So	Centennial High School	Louisville, Kentucky
F	30	Olivia Poulivaati	6 ft 0 in (1.83 m)	Fr	Tualatin High School	Tualatin, Oregon
G	31	Tiffany Siu	5 ft 6 in (1.68 m)	Sr	Oakland Technical High School	Oakland, California
G	32	Gabby Giuffre	5 ft 11 in (1.8 m)	Sr	San Diego	La Selva Beach, California
F	33	Hannah Hartley	5 ft 11 in (1.8 m)	Jr	Galena High School	Reno, Nevada
G	35	Elle Motherway	5 ft 11 in (1.8 m)	Fr	Bishop Manogue High School	Reno, Nevada
F	52	Natalie Lathrop	6 ft 3 in (1.91 m)	RS So	Tualatin High School	Tualatin, Oregon

Head coach

- Amanda Levens (Arizona State)

Assistant coach(es)

- Laura Gonsalves (Washington)
- Ashley Elliott (Wyoming)
- Halie Bergman (Nevada)

Legend

- (C) Team captain
- (S) Suspended
- (I) Ineligible
- (W) Walk-on
- Injured
- Current redshirt

Roster
Last update: March 8, 2024

== Schedule and results ==
Date time, TV	Rank^{#}	Opponent^{#}	Result	Record	Site (attendance) city, state
Exhibition
October 29, 2023*; 1:00 pm		Cal State East Bay	W 90–52	–	Lawlor Events Center (–); Reno, NV
Non-conference regular season
November 9, 2023*; 6:30 pm, NSN/MW Network		Sacramento State	W 69–53	1–0	Lawlor Events Center (1,219); Reno, NV
November 12, 2023*; 1:00 pm, ESPN+		at Long Beach State	L 57–79	1–1	Walter Pyramid (1,050); Long Beach, CA
November 17, 2023*; 6:30 pm, MW Network		Pepperdine	W 64–41	2–1	Lawlor Events Center (1,022); Reno, NV
November 21, 2023*; 6:30 pm, NSN/MW Network		Oregon	L 47–76	2–2	Lawlor Events Center (2,193); Reno, NV
November 24, 2023*; 10:00 am, SLN		vs. South Alabama; University of Denver Classic	W 73–62	3–2	Hamilton Gymnasium (156); Denver, CO
November 25, 2023*; 10:00 am, SLN		vs. Central Arkansas; University of Denver Classic	W 67–65 ^{OT}	4–2	Hamilton Gymnasium (–); Denver, CO
November 29, 2023*; 1:00 pm, NSN/MW Network		San Diego	W 76–63	5–2	Lawlor Events Center (1,003); Reno, NV
December 2, 2023*; 1:00 pm, NSN/MW Network		UC Santa Barbara	L 66–73 ^{OT}	5–3	Lawlor Events Center (1,258); Reno, NV
December 6, 2023*; 4:30 pm, ESPN+		at Weber State	L 55–57	5–4	Dee Events Center (385); Ogden, UT
December 9, 2023*; 2:00 pm		at California	L 49–76	5–5	Haas Pavilion (1,024); Berkeley, CA
December 16, 2023*; 1:00 pm, MW Network		Stanislaus State	W 88–53	6–5	Lawlor Events Center (1,279); Reno, NV
December 20, 2023*; 10:00 am		vs. Western Kentucky; Lady Bear Classic	L 60–66	6–6	Great Southern Bank Arena (–); Springfield, MO
December 21, 2023*; 10:00 am		vs. BYU; Lady Bear Classic	L 59–72	6–7	Great Southern Bank Arena (–); Springfield, MO
Mountain West regular season
December 30, 2023; 1:00 pm, NSN/MW Network		New Mexico	L 59–69	6–8 (0–1)	Lawlor Events Center (1,444); Reno, NV
January 3, 2024; 5:30 pm, MW Network		at Boise State	W 58–57	7–8 (1–1)	ExtraMile Arena (1,506); Boise, ID
January 10, 2024; 6:30 pm, MW Network		Air Force	L 71–75	7–9 (1–2)	Lawlor Events Center (1,142); Reno, NV
January 13, 2024; 2:00 pm, MW Network		at San Jose State	W 64–57	8–9 (2–2)	Provident Credit Union Event Center (742); San Jose, CA
January 17, 2024; 5:00 pm, MW Network		at Utah State	W 89–44	9–9 (3–2)	Smith Spectrum (243); Logan, UT
January 20, 2024; 1:00 pm, NSN/MW Network		Fresno State	W 63–62	10–9 (4–2)	Lawlor Events Center (1,382); Reno, NV
January 23, 2024; 11:00 am, NSN/MW Network		Colorado State	W 78–51	11–9 (5–2)	Lawlor Events Center (6,999); Reno, NV
January 27, 2024; 2:00 pm, MW Network		at UNLV	L 47–92	11–10 (5–3)	Cox Pavilion (2,555); Paradise, NV
January 31, 2024; 6:30 pm, NSN/MW Network		Utah State	L 62–65	11–11 (5–4)	Lawlor Events Center (1,189); Reno, NV
February 3, 2024; 1:00 pm, MW Network		at Wyoming	L 52–59	11–12 (5–5)	Arena-Auditorium (2,644); Laramie, WY
February 7, 2024; 5:30 pm, MW Network		at Air Force	W 62–56	12–12 (6–5)	Clune Arena (342); Colorado Springs, CO
February 14, 2024; 6:30 pm, NSN/MW Network		San Diego State	W 72–71	13–12 (7–5)	Lawlor Events Center (1,428); Reno, NV
February 17, 2024; 1:00 pm, NSN/MW Network		Boise State	W 68–65 ^{OT}	14–12 (8–5)	Lawlor Events Center (1,442); Reno, NV
February 21, 2024; 6:00 pm, MW Network		at Fresno State	L 45–57	14–13 (8–6)	Save Mart Center (1,163); Fresno, CA
February 24, 2024; 6:30 pm, FS1		UNLV	L 67–98	14–14 (8–7)	Lawlor Events Center (2,127); Reno, NV
February 28, 2024; 10:00 am, MW Network		at Colorado State	L 51–54	14–15 (8–8)	Moby Arena (6,536); Fort Collins, CO
March 2, 2024; 1:00 pm, MW Network		at New Mexico	W 83–82	15–15 (9–8)	The Pit (6,303); Albuquerque, NM
March 5, 2024; 6:30 pm, NSN/MW Network		San Jose State	W 82–65	16–15 (10–8)	Lawlor Events Center (1,222); Reno, NV
Mountain West tournament
March 11, 2024; 2:30 pm, MW Network	(4)	vs. (5) Colorado State; Quarterfinals	L 54–65	16–16	Thomas & Mack Center; Paradise, NV
*Non-conference game. ^{#}Rankings from AP Poll. (#) Tournament seedings in parentheses. All times are in Pacific.
