= 2023–24 Wyoming Cowgirls basketball team =

Intercollegiate basketball season

2023–24 Wyoming Cowgirls basketball

WNIT, Great 8
- Conference: Mountain West Conference
- Record: 18–15 (11–7 Mountain West)
- Head coach: Heather Ezell (2nd season)
- Assistant coaches: Ryan Larsen; Fallon Lewis; Natalie Baker; Cameron Tucker
- Home arena: Arena-Auditorium

2023–24 Mountain West Conference women's basketball standings
	Conf.				Overall
Team	W		L	PCT	W		L	PCT
UNLV †	17	–	1	.944	30	–	3	.909
New Mexico	12	–	6	.667	21	–	11	.656
Wyoming	11	–	7	.611	18	–	15	.545
Nevada	10	–	8	.556	16	–	16	.500
Colorado State	10	–	8	.556	20	–	11	.645
San Diego State	10	–	8	.556	22	–	13	.629
Boise State	10	–	8	.556	21	–	14	.600
Air Force	8	–	10	.444	15	–	17	.469
Fresno State	7	–	11	.389	14	–	18	.438
Utah State	2	–	16	.111	5	–	25	.167
San Jose State	2	–	16	.111	7	–	24	.226
† 2024 Mountain West tournament winner

The 2023–24 Wyoming Cowgirls basketball team represented the University of Wyoming in the 2023–24 NCAA Division I women's basketball season. The Cowgirls were led by head coach Heather Ezell, in her second season. The Cowgirls played their home games at the Arena-Auditorium, and were members of the Mountain West Conference.

== Previous season ==
The Cowgirls finished the 2022–23 season 23–11, 13–5 in Mountain West play to finish in second place in the conference. They lost in the championship of the Mountain West Conference Women's Basketball tournament to UNLV. The Cowgirls were invited to the WNIT, where they lost in the 2nd round to Kansas State.

== Offseason ==
=== Departures ===
Name	Number	Pos.	Height	Year	Hometown	Reason for departure
Grace Ellis	4	F	6'0"	Sr.	Brisbane, AUS	Transferred to Cleveland State
Quinn Weidemann	14	G	5'9"	Sr.	Omaha, NE	Graduated
Lexi Bull	24	G/F	6'0"	Sr.	Pocatello, ID	Transferred to Tarleton State
Tommi Olson	24	G	5'6"	Sr.	Worland, WY	Graduated

=== Arrivals ===
Name	Number	Pos.	Height	Year	Hometown	Previous School
Madi Symons	11	F	6'0"	Fr.	Coeur d'Alene, ID	Coeur d'Alene HS
Kati Ollilainen	14	G	5'9"	Fr.	Helsinki, FIN	HBA-Marsky
Maren McKenna	21	G	5'9"	Fr.	Hyde Park, UT	Green Canyon HS
Joslin Igo	23	G	5'6"	Jr.	Douglas, WY	Casper College
Mikyn Hamlin	25	G	5'8"	Fr.	Hugoton, KS	Hugoton HS
McKinley Dickerson	42	G	5'11"	Sr.	Lyman, WY	Returning from Mission (LDS Church)

== Roster ==
2022–23 Wyoming Cowgirls women's basketball team
Players
Coaches

Pos.	#	Name	Height	Year	Previous school	Hometown
G	1	Bailey Wilborn	5 ft 8 in (1.73 m)	Jr	Maine	Wichita, KS
G	2	Emily Mellema	5 ft 11 in (1.8 m)	Jr	Lynden Christian HS	Lynden, WA
G	3	Grace Moyers	5 ft 8 in (1.73 m)	So	Erie HS	Erie, CO
G/F	5	Tess Barnes	6 ft 2 in (1.88 m)	Jr	Maribyrnong College	Gisborne, AUS
F	10	Paula Salazar	6 ft 3 in (1.91 m)	Sr	Institute Vilanova del Valles	Barcelona, ESP
F	11	Madi Symons	6 ft 0 in (1.83 m)	Fr	Coeur d'Alene HS	Coeur d'Alene, ID
G	12	Malene Pedersen	5 ft 11 in (1.8 m)	RS So	Kansas State	Aabyhøj, DEN
G	14	Kati Ollilainen	5 ft 9 in (1.75 m)	Fr	HBA-Marsky	Helsinki, FIN
F	15	Marta Savic	6 ft 1 in (1.85 m)	Sr	Sport Gymnasium	Zagreb, CRO
G	21	Maren McKenna	5 ft 9 in (1.75 m)	Fr	Green Canyon HS	Hyde Park, UT
G	23	Joslin Igo	5 ft 6 in (1.68 m)	Jr	Casper College	Douglas, WY
G	25	Mikyn Hamlin	5 ft 8 in (1.73 m)	Fr	Hugoton, HS	Hugoton, KS
G	30	Ola Ustowska	5 ft 10 in (1.78 m)	Sr	SMS PZKosz Lomianki	Kartuzy, POL
G	42	McKinley Dickerson	5 ft 11 in (1.8 m)	Sr	Lyman HS	Lyman, WY
C	45	Allyson Fertig	6 ft 4 in (1.93 m)	Jr	Douglas HS	Glendo, WY

Head coach

- Heather Ezell (Iowa State)

Assistant coach(es)

- Ryan Larsen (MSU Moorhead)
- Fallon Lewis (Wyoming)
- Natalie Baker (Wyoming)
- Cameron Tucker (Ball State)

Legend

- (C) Team captain
- (S) Suspended
- (I) Ineligible
- (W) Walk-on
- Injured
- Current redshirt

Roster
Last update: November 7, 2023

== Schedule ==
Date time, TV	Rank^{#}	Opponent^{#}	Result	Record	Site (attendance) city, state
Exhibition
November 2, 2023*; 6:30 pm		Western Colorado	W 86–72	0–0	Arena-Auditorium (2,022); Laramie, WY
Non–Conference
November 6*; 6:30 pm		North Dakota	W 77–60	1–0	Arena-Auditorium (2,284); Laramie, WY
November 10*; 6:30 pm, MW Network		Nebraska	L 52–71	1–1	Arena-Auditorium (3,460); Laramie, WY
November 14*; 6:00 pm		at Denver	W 58–41	2–1	Hamilton Gymnasium (615); Denver, CO
November 18*; 3:00 pm		at Gonzaga	L 64–80	2–2	McCarthey Athletic Center (5,059); Spokane, WA
November 21*; 11:00 am, MW Network		Chadron State	W 78–32	3–2	Arena-Auditorium (7,550); Laramie, WY
November 28*; 6:30 pm, MW Network		BYU	W 86–74	4–2	Arena-Auditorium (2,442); Laramie, WY
December 3*; 12:00 pm, BIG12/ESPN+		at Oklahoma State	L 62–78	4–3	Gallagher-Iba Arena (1,862); Stillwater, OK
December 10*; 1:00 pm, MW Network		No. 22 Creighton	L 61–73	4–4	Arena-Auditorium (2,204); Laramie, WY
December 17*; 12:00 pm		at Montana State	L 55–64	4–5	Brick Breeden Fieldhouse (1,501); Bozeman, MT
December 21*; 4:30 pm		vs. Wright State; Las Vegas Holiday Hoops Tournament	W 71–61	5–5	South Point Arena; Enterprise, NV
December 22*; 12:00 pm		vs. Eastern Washington; Las Vegas Holiday Hoops Tournament	L 43–62	5–6	South Point Arena; Las Vegas, NV
Mountain West Conference
December 30; 2:00 pm, MW Network		Boise State	W 61–47	6–6 (1–0)	Arena-Auditorium (2,939); Laramie, WY
January 3, 2024; 6:00 pm, MW Network		at Utah State	W 54–48	7–6 (2–0)	Smith Spectrum (662); Logan, UT
January 6; 1:00 pm, MW Network		at Air Force	W 68–51	8–6 (3–0)	Clune Arena (511); Colorado Springs, CO
January 10; 6:30 pm, MW Network		San Diego State	W 72–55	9–6 (4–0)	Arena-Auditorium (2,060); Laramie, WY
January 17; 7:00 pm, MW Network		at New Mexico	L 61–68	9–7 (4–1)	The Pit (4,744); Albuquerque, NM
January 20; 2:00 pm, MW Network		Colorado State; Border War	W 67–63	10–7 (5–1)	Arena-Auditorium (3,030); Laramie, WY
January 24; 6:30 pm, MW Network		Air Force	W 66–63	11–7 (6–1)	Arena-Auditorium (2,333); Laramie, WY
January 27; 2:00 pm, MW Network		at Fresno State	W 69–47	12–7 (7–1)	Save Mart Center (1,167); Fresno, CA
January 31; 7:30 pm, MW Network		at UNLV	L 51–58	12–8 (7–2)	Thomas & Mack Center (2,059); Paradise, NV
February 3; 2:00 pm, MW Network		Nevada	W 59–52	13–8 (8–2)	Arena-Auditorium (2,644); Laramie, WY
February 7; 6:30 pm, MW Network		Utah State	W 62–47	14–8 (9–2)	Arena-Auditorium (2,077); Laramie, WY
February 10; 1:00 pm, MW Network		at Boise State	L 42–56	14–9 (9–3)	ExtraMile Arena (1,492); Boise, ID
February 17; 12:30 pm, MW Network		at Colorado State	L 70–75	14–10 (9–4)	Moby Arena (8,083); Fort Collins, CO
February 21; 6:30 pm, MW Network		UNLV	L 60–63 ^{OT}	14–11 (9–5)	Arena-Auditorium (2,261); Laramie, WY
February 24; 2:00 pm, MW Network		New Mexico	L 58–59	14–12 (9–6)	Arena-Auditorium (3,166); Laramie, WY
February 28; 8:00 pm, MW Network		at San Jose State	W 88–73	15–12 (10–6)	Provident Credit Union Event Center; San Jose, CA
March 2; 1:00 pm, MW Network		Fresno State	W 62–51	16–12 (11–6)	Arena-Auditorium (2,860); Laramie, WY
March 5; 7:00 pm, MW Network		at San Diego State	L 55–58	16–13 (11–7)	Viejas Arena (1,937); San Diego, CA
Mountain West Women's Tournament
March 11; 8:30 pm, MW Network	(3)	(6) Boise State	L 54–62	16–14	Thomas & Mack Center (2,683); Paradise, NV
WNIT
March 24*; 1:00 p.m.		UTSA; Second Round	W 80–64	17–14	Arena-Auditorium (2,061); Laramie, WY
March 29*; 6:30 p.m.		South Dakota; Super 16	W 84–52	18–14	Arena-Auditorium (3,342); Laramie, WY
April 1*; 6:30 p.m.		Minnesota; Great 8	L 54–65	18–15	Arena-Auditorium (3,710); Laramie, WY
*Non-conference game. ^{#}Rankings from AP Poll. (#) Tournament seedings in parentheses. All times are in Mountain Time. All dates, times, and TV are tentative and subject to change.
