= 2023–24 New Mexico Lobos women's basketball team =

American college basketball season

2023–24 New Mexico Lobos women's basketball
- Conference: Mountain West Conference
- Record: 21–11 (12–6 MW)
- Head coach: Mike Bradbury (8th season)
- Associate head coach: Keith Freeman
- Assistant coaches: Nike McClure; Mackenzie Novak
- Home arena: The Pit

2023–24 Mountain West Conference women's basketball standings
	Conf.				Overall
Team	W		L	PCT	W		L	PCT
UNLV †	17	–	1	.944	30	–	3	.909
New Mexico	12	–	6	.667	21	–	11	.656
Wyoming	11	–	7	.611	18	–	15	.545
Nevada	10	–	8	.556	16	–	16	.500
Colorado State	10	–	8	.556	20	–	11	.645
San Diego State	10	–	8	.556	22	–	13	.629
Boise State	10	–	8	.556	21	–	14	.600
Air Force	8	–	10	.444	15	–	17	.469
Fresno State	7	–	11	.389	14	–	18	.438
Utah State	2	–	16	.111	5	–	25	.167
San Jose State	2	–	16	.111	7	–	24	.226
† 2024 Mountain West tournament winner

The 2023–24 New Mexico Lobos women's basketball team represented the University of New Mexico during the 2023–24 NCAA Division I women's basketball season. The Lobos, led by eighth-year head coach Mike Bradbury, played their home games at The Pit in Albuquerque, New Mexico, as members of the Mountain West Conference.

== Previous season ==
The Lobos finished the 2022–23 season 21–12, 12–6 in Mountain West play to finish in a three-way tie for third place. They were defeated by San Diego State in the quarterfinals of the Mountain West tournament. They received an at-large bid into the WNIT, where they would defeat Northern Arizona in the first round, before falling to Washington in the second round.

== Roster ==
2023–24 New Mexico Lobos women's basketball team
Players
Coaches

Pos.	#	Name	Height	Year	Previous school	Hometown
G	1	Nahawa Diarra Berthe	5 ft 9 in (1.75 m)	Jr	Odessa College	Barcelona, Spain
G	2	Natalia Chavez	5 ft 10 in (1.78 m)	RS Fr	Volcano Vista High School	Cochiti Pueblo, New Mexico
G	3	Nyah Wilson	5 ft 8 in (1.73 m)	Jr	Syracuse	Dallas, Texas
PG	4	Gianna McManaman	5 ft 7 in (1.7 m)	Fr	Northwood High School	Chapel Hill, North Carolina
G	5	Lara Langermann	5 ft 7 in (1.7 m)	Fr	Theodor-Heuss-Gymnasium Hagen	Breckerfeld, Germany
F	10	Paris Lauro	6 ft 1 in (1.85 m)	Fr	Highland Park High School	Dallas, Texas
G	12	Aniyah Augmon	5 ft 8 in (1.73 m)	Jr	Woodside Priory School	San Jose, California
F	14	Hulda Joaquim	6 ft 1 in (1.85 m)	Sr	Seward County Community College	Maputo, Mozambique
PG	15	Jaelyn Bates	5 ft 7 in (1.7 m)	So	Volcano Vista High School	Albuquerque, New Mexico
G	21	Mackenzie Curtis	5 ft 10 in (1.78 m)	RS So	El Capitan High School	Lakeside, California
C	22	Charlotte Kohl	6 ft 5 in (1.96 m)	GS	Mississippi State	Giessen, Germany
F	30	Paula Reus	6 ft 1 in (1.85 m)	Jr	IES Joaquim Blume	Palma de Mallorca, Spain
G	33	Vianè Cumber	5 ft 10 in (1.78 m)	Jr	Sandia High School	Albuquerque, New Mexico

Head coach

- Mike Bradbury (Chattanooga)

Assistant coach(es)

- Keith Freeman (Huntington)
- Nike McClure (New Mexico)
- Mackenzie Novak (Bethel)

Legend

- (C) Team captain
- (S) Suspended
- (I) Ineligible
- (W) Walk-on
- Injured
- Current redshirt

Roster
Last update: March 8, 2024

== Schedule and results ==
Date time, TV	Rank^{#}	Opponent^{#}	Result	Record	Site (attendance) city, state
Exhibition
October 22, 2023*; 2:00 pm		Eastern New Mexico	W 77–57	–	The Pit (–); Albuquerque, NM
October 29, 2023*; 4:00 pm		Adams State	W 60–45	–	The Pit (–); Albuquerque, NM
Non-conference regular season
November 6, 2023*; 5:00 pm, MW Network		Texas Southern	W 76–59	1–0	The Pit (5,055); Albuquerque, NM
November 9, 2023*; 7:00 pm, ESPN+		at Pepperdine	W 57–48	2–0	Firestone Fieldhouse (113); Malibu, CA
November 12, 2023*; 2:00 pm, MW Network		Tarleton State	W 64–55	3–0	The Pit (4,626); Albuquerque, NM
November 15, 2023*; 7:00 pm, MW Network		Texas A&M–Commerce	W 75–74	4–0	The Pit (4,718); Albuquerque, NM
November 23, 2023*; 7:00 pm, FloHoops		vs. Montana State; Cancún Challenge Riviera Tournament	L 57–75	4–1	Hard Rock Hotel Riviera Maya (166); Cancún, Mexico
November 24, 2023*; 4:30 pm, FloHoops		vs. Georgia Tech; Cancún Challenge Riviera Tournament	L 55–66	4–2	Hard Rock Hotel Riviera Maya (150); Cancún, Mexico
November 28, 2023*; 7:00 pm, MW Network		Eastern Illinois	W 81–78 ^{OT}	5–2	The Pit (4,471); Albuquerque, NM
December 2, 2023*; 1:00 pm, MW Network		New Mexico State; Rio Grande Rivalry	W 67–52	6–2	The Pit (5,379); Albuquerque, NM
December 4, 2023*; 7:00 pm, MW Network		Mississippi Valley State	W 68–45	7–2	The Pit (4,514); Albuquerque, NM
December 7, 2023*; 7:00 pm, MW Network		Southern Utah	L 40–58	7–3	The Pit (4,526); Albuquerque, NM
December 10, 2023*; 2:00 pm, MW Network		Hampton	W 68–55	8–3	The Pit (4,638); Albuquerque, NM
December 17, 2023*; 2:00 pm, MW Network		Western New Mexico	W 71–47	9–3	The Pit (4,889); Albuquerque, NM
December 22, 2023*; 2:00 pm, ESPN+		at No. 20 Gonzaga	L 56–67	9–4	McCarthey Athletic Center (5,241); Spokane, WA
Mountain West regular season
December 30, 2023; 2:00 pm, MW Network		at Nevada	W 69–59	10–4 (1–0)	Lawlor Events Center (1,444); Reno, NV
January 6, 2024; 2:00 pm, MW Network		Boise State	L 56–64	10–5 (1–1)	The Pit (5,715); Albuquerque, NM
January 10, 2024; 7:00 pm, MW Network		Utah State	W 71–67	11–5 (2–1)	The Pit (4,704); Albuquerque, NM
January 13, 2024; 1:00 pm, MW Network		at Colorado State	L 55–61	11–6 (2–2)	Moby Arena (1,488); Fort Collins, CO
January 17, 2024; 7:00 pm, MW Network		Wyoming	W 68–61	12–6 (3–2)	The Pit (4,744); Albuquerque, NM
January 20, 2024; 3:00 pm, MW Network		at No. 25 UNLV	W 69–66	13–6 (4–2)	Cox Pavilion (1,188); Paradise, NV
January 24, 2024; 7:00 pm, MW Network		Fresno State	W 84–77	14–6 (5–2)	The Pit (4,716); Albuquerque, NM
January 27, 2024; 1:00 pm, MW Network		at Air Force	W 66–51	15–6 (6–2)	Clune Arena (688); Colorado Springs, CO
January 31, 2024; 12:00 pm, MW Network		at San Jose State	W 65–54	16–6 (7–2)	Provident Credit Union Event Center (220); San Jose, CA
February 3, 2024; 2:00 pm, MW Network		UNLV	L 56–62	16–7 (7–3)	The Pit (6,018); Albuquerque, NM
February 7, 2024; 12:00 pm, MW Network		at San Diego State	L 53–60	16–8 (7–4)	Viejas Arena (4,206); San Diego, CA
February 10, 2024; 12:00 pm, MW Network		Colorado State	W 62–46	17–8 (8–4)	The Pit (5,103); Albuquerque, NM
February 14, 2024; 7:00 pm, MW Network		San Jose State	W 72–51	18–8 (9–4)	The Pit (4,807); Albuquerque, NM
February 21, 2024; 6:30 pm, MW Network		at Boise State	L 55–58	18–9 (9–5)	ExtraMile Arena (1,454); Boise, ID
February 24, 2024; 2:00 pm, MW Network		at Wyoming	W 59–58	19–9 (10–5)	Arena-Auditorium (3,166); Laramie, WY
February 28, 2024; 7:00 pm, MW Network		San Diego State	W 66–63	20–9 (11–5)	The Pit (5,261); Albuquerque, NM
March 2, 2024; 2:00 pm, MW Network		Nevada	L 82–83	20–10 (11–6)	The Pit (6,303); Albuquerque, NM
March 5, 2024; 7:00 pm, MW Network		at Fresno State	W 72–58	21–10 (12–6)	Save Mart Center (1,023); Fresno, CA
Mountain West tournament
March 11, 2024; 6:00 pm, MW Network	(2)	vs. (7) San Diego State; Quarterfinals	L 56–67	21–11	Thomas & Mack Center; Paradise, NV
*Non-conference game. ^{#}Rankings from AP Poll. (#) Tournament seedings in parentheses. All times are in Mountain.
