= 2023–24 Utah State Aggies women's basketball team =

American college basketball season

2023–24 Utah State Aggies women's basketball
- Conference: Mountain West Conference
- Record: 5–25 (2–16 MW)
- Head coach: Kayla Ard (4th season)
- Assistant coaches: Lindsay Woolley; CJ Vaifanua-Pace; McKenzie Mangino; Claire Gritt; Spenser Hogg
- Home arena: Smith Spectrum

2023–24 Mountain West Conference women's basketball standings
| | Conf. | | | | Overall |
| Team | W | | L | PCT | W | | L | PCT |
|---|---|---|---|---|---|---|---|---|
| UNLV † | 17 | – | 1 | .944 | 30 | – | 3 | .909 |
| New Mexico | 12 | – | 6 | .667 | 21 | – | 11 | .656 |
| Wyoming | 11 | – | 7 | .611 | 18 | – | 15 | .545 |
| Nevada | 10 | – | 8 | .556 | 16 | – | 16 | .500 |
| Colorado State | 10 | – | 8 | .556 | 20 | – | 11 | .645 |
| San Diego State | 10 | – | 8 | .556 | 22 | – | 13 | .629 |
| Boise State | 10 | – | 8 | .556 | 21 | – | 14 | .600 |
| Air Force | 8 | – | 10 | .444 | 15 | – | 17 | .469 |
| Fresno State | 7 | – | 11 | .389 | 14 | – | 18 | .438 |
| Utah State | 2 | – | 16 | .111 | 5 | – | 25 | .167 |
| San Jose State | 2 | – | 16 | .111 | 7 | – | 24 | .226 |
† 2024 Mountain West tournament winner

The 2023–24 Utah State Aggies women's basketball team represented Utah State University during the 2023–24 NCAA Division I women's basketball season. The Aggies, who were led by fourth-year head coach Kayla Ard, played their home games at the Smith Spectrum in Logan, Utah, as members of the Mountain West Conference. They finished the season 5–25, 2–16 in Mountain West play, to finish in a tie for tenth (last) place. They were defeated by Boise State in the first round of the Mountain West tournament. Following the loss, the school announced that head coach Kayla Ard would be relieved of her duties.

== Previous season ==
The Aggies finished the 2022–23 season 4–26, 1–17 in Mountain West play, to finish in last (11th) place. They were defeated by Boise State in the first round of the Mountain West tournament.

== Roster ==
2023–24 Utah State Aggies women's basketball team
Players
Coaches

| Pos. | # | Name | Height | Year | Previous school | Hometown |
|---|---|---|---|---|---|---|
| G | 0 | Ivory Finley | 5 ft 10 in (1.78 m) | Jr | UMass Lowell | Minneapolis, MN |
| G/F | 1 | Samiana Suguturaga | 5 ft 11 in (1.8 m) | Jr | Snow College | Orem, UT |
| G | 2 | Isabella Tañedo | 5 ft 4 in (1.63 m) | So | St. John's College High School | Laurel, MD |
| G | 3 | Ali Wetta | 5 ft 11 in (1.8 m) | Fr | Valor Christian High School | Castle Rock, CO |
| G | 4 | Cheyenne Stubbs | 5 ft 5 in (1.65 m) | Jr | Canisius | Bradenton, FL |
| G | 10 | Taylia Stimpson | 5 ft 10 in (1.78 m) | GS | Utah Tech | Paul, ID |
| G | 11 | Macy Smith | 5 ft 10 in (1.78 m) | Jr | Cal State Northridge | Minneapolis, MN |
| F | 14 | Lauren Crocker | 6 ft 4 in (1.93 m) | Fr | Perry High School | Calgary, AB |
| F | 15 | Gracie Johnson | 6 ft 6 in (1.98 m) | Fr | Nyssa High School | Nyssa, OR |
| F | 20 | Lillian Harris | 6 ft 0 in (1.83 m) | Jr | CCBC Essex | Westminster, MD |
| F | 23 | Tiairra Hill-Brown | 6 ft 1 in (1.85 m) | So | Ed W. Clark High School | Stockton, CA |
| G | 24 | Skye Miller | 5 ft 11 in (1.8 m) | Jr | Eastern Arizona College | Anchorage, AK |
| F | 25 | Bridget Mullings | 6 ft 3 in (1.91 m) | Jr | UC San Diego | Phoenix, AZ |
| F | 31 | Allyzee Verdan | 6 ft 2 in (1.88 m) | Sr | Salt Lake Community College | Cayenne, French Guiana |
| G | 33 | Livia Knapp | 5 ft 7 in (1.7 m) | Jr | College of Southern Idaho | Hillsboro, OR |

Head coach

- Kayla Ard (Southeastern Louisiana)

Assistant coach(es)

- Lindsay Woolley (Montana)
- CJ Vaifanua-Pace (South Carolina)
- McKenzie Mangino (Hawaiʻi–Hilo)
- Claire Gritt (Denver)
- Spenser Hogg (TCU)

Legend

- (C) Team captain
- (S) Suspended
- (I) Ineligible
- (W) Walk-on
- Injured
- Current redshirt

Roster
Last update: March 10, 2024

== Schedule and results ==
| Date time, TV | Rank^{#} | Opponent^{#} | Result | Record | Site (attendance) city, state |
Exhibition
| October 30, 2023*; 6:00 p.m. | | Fort Lewis | L 69–70 | – | Smith Spectrum (349); Logan, UT |
Non-conference regular season
| November 6, 2023*; 7:00 p.m., ESPN+ | | at Cal State Northridge | L 64–79 | 0–1 | Premier America Credit Union Arena (386); Northridge, CA |
| November 10, 2023*; 5:00 p.m., MW Network | | Eastern Washington | L 39–75 | 0–2 | Smith Spectrum (326); Logan, UT |
| November 14, 2023*; 6:00 p.m., SLN | | at Kansas City | W 62–60 | 1–2 | Swinney Recreation Center (462); Kansas City, MO |
| November 17, 2023*; 6:00 p.m., MW Network | | Weber State | W 72–62 | 2–2 | Smith Spectrum (448); Logan, UT |
| November 22, 2023*; 5:00 p.m., ESPN+ | | at UC Riverside | L 51–52 | 2–3 | SRC Arena (97); Riverside, CA |
| November 25, 2023*; 2:00 p.m., MW Network | | Warner Pacific | W 66–54 | 3–3 | Smith Spectrum (208); Logan, UT |
| November 29, 2023*; 11:00 a.m., MW Network | | Idaho | L 43–70 | 3–4 | Smith Spectrum (3,225); Logan, UT |
| December 5, 2023*; 3:00 p.m., ESPN+ | | at BYU | L 66–72 | 3–5 | Marriott Center (1,565); Provo, UT |
| December 9, 2023*; 2:00 p.m., ESPN+ | | at Utah Valley | L 38–68 | 3–6 | UCCU Center (472); Orem, UT |
| December 16, 2023*; 7:00 p.m., MW Network | | Northern Colorado | L 57–75 | 3–7 | Smith Spectrum (238); Logan, UT |
| December 18, 2023*; 6:00 p.m., MW Network | | Western Colorado | L 49–51 | 3–8 | Smith Spectrum (202); Logan, UT |
Mountain West regular season
| December 30, 2023; 2:00 p.m., CBSSN | | at UNLV | L 68–107 | 3–9 (0–1) | Cox Pavilion (1,363); Paradise, NV |
| January 3, 2024; 6:00 p.m., MW Network | | Wyoming | L 48–54 | 3–10 (0–2) | Smith Spectrum (662); Logan, UT |
| January 6, 2024; 1:00 p.m., MW Network | | San Jose State | L 54–69 | 3–11 (0–3) | Smith Spectrum (330); Logan, UT |
| January 10, 2024; 7:00 p.m., MW Network | | at New Mexico | L 67–71 | 3–12 (0–4) | The Pit (4,704); Albuquerque, NM |
| January 13, 2024; 3:00 p.m., MW Network | | at Fresno State | L 64–90 | 3–13 (0–5) | Save Mart Center (1,032); Fresno, CA |
| January 17, 2024; 6:00 p.m., MW Network | | Nevada | L 44–89 | 3–14 (0–6) | Smith Spectrum (243); Logan, UT |
| January 20, 2024; 3:00 p.m., MW Network | | at Boise State | L 41–76 | 3–15 (0–7) | ExtraMile Arena (1,578); Boise, ID |
| January 24, 2024; 6:00 p.m., MW Network | | San Diego State | L 62–76 | 3–16 (0–8) | Smith Spectrum (287); Logan, UT |
| January 31, 2024; 7:30 p.m., MW Network | | at Nevada | W 65–62 | 4–16 (1–8) | Lawlor Events Center (1,189); Reno, NV |
| February 3, 2024; 2:00 p.m., MW Network | | Fresno State | L 50–70 | 4–17 (1–9) | Smith Spectrum (455); Logan, UT |
| February 7, 2024; 6:30 p.m., MW Network | | at Wyoming | L 47–62 | 4–18 (1–10) | Arena-Auditorium (2,077); Laramie, WY |
| February 10, 2024; 2:00 p.m., MW Network | | Air Force | L 72–78 | 4–19 (1–11) | Smith Spectrum (394); Logan, UT |
| February 14, 2024; 6:00 p.m., MW Network | | Boise State | L 57–73 | 4–20 (1–12) | Smith Spectrum (287); Logan, UT |
| February 17, 2024; 1:00 p.m., MW Network | | at San Diego State | L 62–90 | 4–21 (1–13) | Viejas Arena (1,287); San Diego, CA |
| February 21, 2024; 8:00 p.m., MW Network | | at San Jose State | W 71–70 | 5–21 (2–13) | Provident Credit Union Event Center (723); San Jose, CA |
| February 24, 2024; 2:00 p.m., MW Network | | Colorado State | L 68–90 | 5–22 (2–14) | Smith Spectrum (301); Logan, UT |
| February 28, 2024; 11:00 a.m., MW Network | | at Air Force | L 46–85 | 5–23 (2–15) | Clune Arena (1,050); Colorado Springs, CO |
| March 5, 2024; 6:00 p.m., MW Network | | No. 23 UNLV | L 44–104 | 5–24 (2–16) | Smith Spectrum (483); Logan, UT |
Mountain West tournament
| March 10, 2024; 8:00 p.m., MW Network | (11) | vs. (6) Boise State; First round | L 49–85 | 5–25 | Thomas & Mack Center (–); Paradise, NV |
*Non-conference game. ^{#}Rankings from AP poll. (#) Tournament seedings in parentheses. All times are in Mountain.

== See also ==
- 2023–24 Utah State Aggies men's basketball team
