= 2023–24 BYU Cougars women's basketball team =

Intercollegiate basketball season

2023–24 BYU Cougars women's basketball

WBIT, First Round
- Conference: Big 12 Conference
- Record: 16–17 (6–12 Big 12)
- Head coach: Amber Whiting (2nd season)
- Assistant coaches: Lee Cummard (5th season); Morgan Bailey (2nd season); John Wardenburg (1st season)
- Home arena: Marriott Center

2023–24 Big 12 Conference women's basketball standings
	Conf.				Overall
Team	W		L	PCT	W		L	PCT
No. 21 Oklahoma	15	–	3	.833	23	–	10	.697
No. 7 Texas †	14	–	4	.778	33	–	5	.868
No. 19 Kansas State	13	–	5	.722	26	–	8	.765
No. 25 Iowa State	12	–	6	.667	21	–	12	.636
No. 13 Baylor	12	–	6	.667	26	–	8	.765
No. 24 West Virginia	12	–	6	.667	25	–	8	.758
Kansas	11	–	7	.611	20	–	13	.606
Oklahoma State	7	–	11	.389	14	–	16	.467
TCU	6	–	12	.333	21	–	12	.636
BYU	6	–	12	.333	16	–	17	.485
Cincinnati	5	–	13	.278	14	–	18	.438
Texas Tech	5	–	13	.278	17	–	16	.515
Houston	5	–	13	.278	14	–	16	.467
UCF	3	–	15	.167	12	–	17	.414
† 2024 Big 12 tournament winner Rankings from AP poll

The 2023–24 BYU Cougars women's basketball team represented Brigham Young University during the 2023–24 NCAA Division I women's basketball season. The Cougars, were led by second-year head coach Amber Whiting and played their home games at the Marriott Center as members of the Big 12 Conference.

== Previous season ==
The Cougars finished the 2022–23 season 16–17, 9–9 in WCC play to finish in a tie for third place. They defeated Pepperdine and San Francisco in the first round and quarterfinals of the WCC women's tournament before falling to Gonzaga in the semifinals. They were invited to the WNIT where they lost to Rice in round 1.

== Offseason ==
=== Departures ===
BYU Departures
Name	Number	Pos.	Height	Year	Hometown	Reason for Departure
Gabriela Bosquez	0	G	5'7"	Senior	Kyle, TX	Graduated
Amanada Barcello	1	G	5'11"	Sophomore	Chandler, AZ	Transferred to Utah Valley
Sophia Lee	4	G	5'8"	Freshman	Stockton, CA	Transferred to Sacramento State
Eliza Galbreath	10	F	6'0"	Junior	Ritzville, WA	
Sierra Johnson	13	G	6'0"	Sophomore	Jasper, AR	Transferred to Sacred Heart
Alyssa Blanck	15	F	6'2"	Freshman	Hollday, UT	Transferred to Utah
Devry Millett	20	G	5'10"	Sophomore	Folsom, CA	
Kate Vorwaller	30	G	5'9"	Sophomore	Salt Lake City, UT	
Mayci Taylor	31	G	5'9"	Sophomore	Salina, UT	

=== Incoming ===
BYU incoming transfers
Name	Num	Pos.	Height	Year	Hometown	Previous School
Kylie Krebs	2	G		Junior	Peoria, AZ	Glendale Community College
Lauren Davenport	30	G	5'11"	Junior	Idaho Falls, ID	Boston University

==== Recruiting ====
College recruiting information
Name	Hometown	School	Height	Weight	Commit date
Amari Whiting; PG	Provo, UT	Timpview High School	5 ft 10 in (1.78 m)	N/A	
Amari Whiting; PG	Recruit ratings: ESPN: (95)				
Overall recruit ranking:
Note: In many cases, Scout, Rivals, 247Sports, On3, and ESPN may conflict in their listings of height and weight.; In these cases, the average was taken. ESPN grades are on a 100-point scale.; Sources: "2023 Player Commits". ESPN. Archived from the original on December 11, 2023.

==== Recruiting class of 2024 ====
College recruiting information (2024)
Name	Hometown	School	Height	Weight	Commit date
Delaney Gibb; PG	Raymond, AB	Raymond High School	5 ft 10 in (1.78 m)	N/A	
Delaney Gibb; PG	Recruit ratings: ESPN: (92)				
Overall recruit ranking:
Note: In many cases, Scout, Rivals, 247Sports, On3, and ESPN may conflict in their listings of height and weight.; In these cases, the average was taken. ESPN grades are on a 100-point scale.; Sources: "2024 Player Commits". ESPN. Archived from the original on December 11, 2023.

== 2023–24 media ==
=== BYU Sports Media ===
==== Television/Streaming ====
As new members of the Big 12, all Cougars home games will be shown on Big 12 Now on ESPN+. Neutral site and exhibition matches will be available on BYUtv and ESPN+. With the exception of Texas conference road games will also be shown on Big 12 Now on ESPN+. Texas will be on Longhorn Network. Most remaining non-conference road games will also be televised or streamed. Streaming partners for those games can be found on the schedule.

==== Radio ====
For the first time since 2017–18 BYU Women's Basketball will have regular season games available on the radio. BYU Radio will air every BYU Women's Basketball game on KUMT 107.9 FM, on byuradio.org, and on the BYU Radio App. Unlike previous seasons, which were traditionally a BYUtv simulcast, longtime radio host Jason Shepherd will act as the voice of BYU Women's Basketball.

== Roster ==
2023–24 BYU Cougars women's basketball team
Players
Coaches

Pos.	#	Name	Height	Year	Previous school	Hometown
G	1	Amari Whiting	5 ft 10 in (1.78 m)	Fr	Burley	Boise, ID
G	2	Kylie Krebs	5 ft 7 in (1.7 m)	Jr	Glendale CC	Oahu, HI
G	3	Nani Falatea	5 ft 9 in (1.75 m)	Jr	East	Salt Lake City, UT
F	4	Ali'a Matavao	6 ft 0 in (1.83 m)	Fr	Liberty	Las Vegas, NV
G	5	Arielle Mackey-Williams	5 ft 9 in (1.75 m)	Jr	Tai Wananga Ki Ruakura	Ngati Porou, New Zealand
G	10	Kailey Woolston	5 ft 11 in (1.8 m)	Fr	Lone Peak	Highland, UT
F	11	Kaylee Smiler	5 ft 8 in (1.73 m)	RS Sr	Melville	Hamilton, New Zealand
F	12	Lauren Gustin	5 ft 8 in (1.73 m)	RS Sr	Salem Hills; Salt Lake CC	Salem, UT
F	15	McKinley Willardson	6 ft 1 in (1.85 m)	Fr	Santiago	Corona, CA
F	20	Marina Mata	6 ft 1 in (1.85 m)	Fr	Instituto Joaquim Blume	Barbastro, Spain
F	21	Heather Hamson	6 ft 3 in (1.91 m)	Jr	Pleasant Grove	Lindon, UT
F	24	Rose Bubakar	6 ft 0 in (1.83 m)	Jr	Frederick	Frederick, MD
F	25	Emma Calvert	6 ft 4 in (1.93 m)	Jr	Fremont	Farr West, UT
G	30	Lauren Davenport	6 ft 0 in (1.83 m)	Jr	Thunder Ridge High School; Boston University	Idaho Falls, ID

Head coach

- Amber Whiting (BYU)

Assistant coach(es)

- Lee Cummard (BYU)
- Morgan Bailey (BYU)
- John Wardenburg (BYU)

Legend

- (C) Team captain
- (S) Suspended
- (I) Ineligible
- (W) Walk-on
- Injured
- Current redshirt

Roster

== Schedule and results ==
Date time, TV	Rank^{#}	Opponent^{#}	Result	Record	Site (attendance) city, state
Exhibition
November 1, 2023*; 3:00 p.m., BYUtv		Westminster	W 92–48		Marriott Center; Provo, UT
Non-conference regular season
November 7, 2023*; 11:00 a.m., ESPN+		at Montana State	W 68–60	1–0	Brick Breeden Fieldhouse (5,017); Bozeman, MT
November 10, 2023*; 11:30 a.m., BIG12/ESPN+		Weber State	W 77–49	2–0	Marriott Center (5,705); Provo, UT
November 14, 2023*; 7:00 p.m., BIG12/ESPN+		Utah Valley; UCCU Crosstown Clash	W 59–44	3–0	Marriott Center (1,690); Provo, UT
November 18, 2023*; 7:30 p.m., BYUtv		vs. Wake Forest; North Shore Showcase	W 67–44	4–0	Cannon Activities Center; Laie, HI
November 21, 2023*; 6:00 p.m., BYUtv		vs. Saint Louis; North Shore Showcase	W 87–66	5–0	Cannon Activities Center (220); Laie, HI
November 25, 2023*; 2:00 p.m., BIG12/ESPN+		Loyola Marymount	W 74–58	6–0	Marriott Center (1,529); Provo, UT
November 28, 2023*; 6:30 p.m., MW Network		at Wyoming	L 74–86	6–1	Arena-Auditorium (2,442); Laramie, WY
December 2, 2023*; 7:00 p.m., P12N		at No. 12 Utah; Rivalry	L 68–87	6–2	Jon M. Huntsman Center (6,182); Salt Lake City, UT
December 5, 2023*; 3:00 p.m., BIG12/ESPN+		Utah State	W 72–66	7–2	Marriott Center (1,565); Provo, UT
December 8, 2023*; 2:00 p.m., BIG12/ESPN+		Boise State	W 65–50	8–2	Marriott Center (2,722); Provo, UT
December 16, 2023*; 2:00 p.m., BIG12/ESPN+		Idaho State	W 79–76 ^{OT}	9–2	Marriott Center (1,911); Provo, UT
December 20, 2023*; 1:30 p.m., ESPN+		at Missouri State; Lady Bear Classic	L 55–56	9–3	Great Southern Bank Arena (1,619); Springfield, MO
December 21, 2023*; 11:00 a.m.		vs. Nevada; Lady Bear Classic	W 72–59	10–3	Great Southern Bank Arena; Springfield, MO
Big 12 Conference regular season
December 30, 2023; 3:30 p.m., BIG12/ESPN+		at No. 23 TCU	L 67–81	10–4 (0–1)	Schollmaier Arena (2,572); Fort Worth, TX
January 3, 2024; 7:00 p.m., BIG12/ESPN+		Oklahoma	L 63–75	10–5 (0–2)	Marriott Center (1,748); Provo, UT
January 6, 2024; 4:00 p.m., BIG12/ESPN+		Iowa State	L 75–80	10–6 (0–3)	Marriott Center (1,872); Provo, UT
January 10, 2024; 6:00 p.m., BIG12/ESPN+		at Houston	L 69–79	10–7 (0–4)	Fertitta Center (805); Houston, TX
January 13, 2024; 4:00 p.m., BIG12/ESPN+		Cincinnati	W 68–58	11–7 (1–4)	Marriott Center (1,786); Provo, UT
January 17, 2024; 5:30 p.m., BIG12/ESPN+		at Oklahoma State	L 50–82	11–8 (1–5)	Gallagher-Iba Arena (2,044); Stillwater, OK
January 20, 2024; 4:00 p.m., BIG12/ESPN+		Texas Tech	W 60–46	12–8 (2–5)	Marriott Center (1,873); Provo, UT
January 27, 2024; 3:00 p.m., BIG12/ESPN+		at No. 4 Kansas State	L 65–68	12–9 (2–6)	Bramlage Coliseum (8,180); Manhattan, KS
January 31, 2024; 5:30 p.m., BIG12/ESPN+		at Kansas	L 53–67	12–10 (2–7)	Allen Fieldhouse (2,964); Lawrence, KS
February 3, 2024; 4:00 p.m., BIG12/ESPN+		No. 23 West Virginia	L 69–76	12–11 (2–8)	Marriott Center (1,754); Provo, UT
February 7, 2024; 7:00 p.m., BIG12/ESPN+		No. 18 Baylor	W 78–66	13–11 (3–8)	Marriott Center (1,525); Provo, UT
February 10, 2024; 10:00 a.m., BIG12/ESPN+		at Cincinnati	W 69–57	14–11 (4–8)	Fifth Third Arena (1,084); Cincinnati, OH
February 13, 2024; 4:00 p.m., BIG12/ESPN+		at UCF	W 64–60	15–11 (5–8)	Addition Financial Arena (849); Orlando, FL
February 17, 2024; 4:00 p.m., BIG12/ESPN+		Kansas	L 62–70	15–12 (5–9)	Marriott Center (2,317); Provo, UT
February 21, 2024; 7:00 p.m., BIG12/ESPN+		TCU	L 58–68	15–13 (5–10)	Marriott Center (1,451); Provo, UT
February 24, 2024; 7:00 p.m., BIG12/ESPN+		at Iowa State	L 49–74	15–14 (5–11)	Hilton Coliseum (10,896); Ames, IA
February 28, 2024; 7:00 p.m., BIG12/ESPN+		Houston	W 64–54	16–14 (6–11)	Marriott Center (1,760); Provo, UT
March 2, 2024; 7:00 p.m., LHN		at No. 3 Texas	L 46–71	16–15 (6–12)	Moody Center (10,364); Austin, TX
Big 12 Conference Tournament
March 8, 2024; 4:30 p.m., ESPN+	(10)	vs. (7) Kansas; Second Round	L 53–77	16–16	T-Mobile Center; Kansas City, MO
WBIT
March 21, 2024*; 7:00 p.m., ESPN+		at (4) Santa Clara; First Round	L 59–60	16–17	Leavey Center (357); Santa Clara, CA
*Non-conference game. ^{#}Rankings from AP Poll. (#) Tournament seedings in parentheses. All times are in Mountain Time.

== See also ==
- 2023–24 BYU Cougars men's basketball team
