= Lindy La Rocque =

American basketball coach

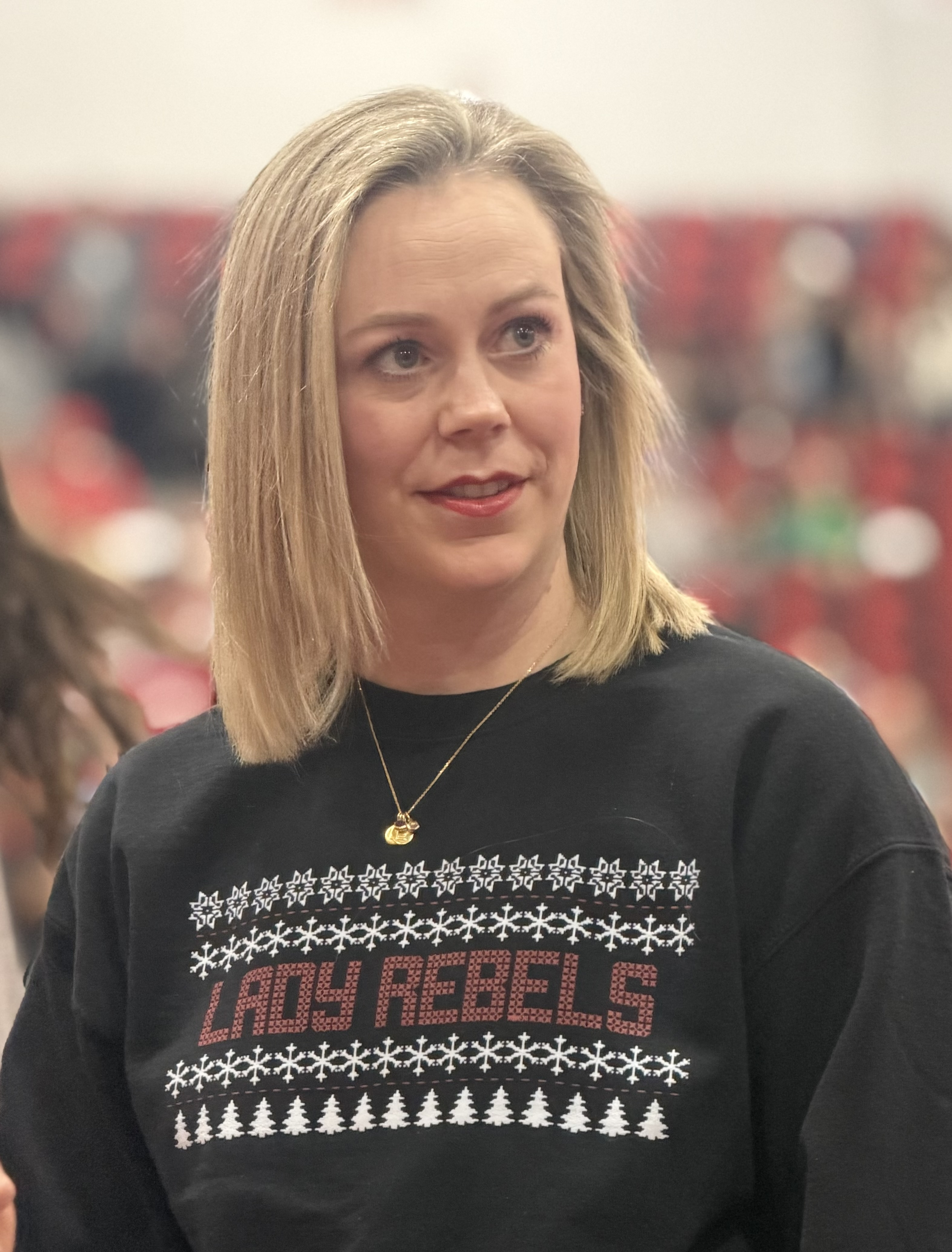
- La Rocque in 2025

Current position
- Title: Head coach
- Team: UNLV
- Conference: Mountain West
- Record: 149–41 (.784)

Biographical details
- Born: December 15, 1989 (age 36); Las Vegas, Nevada, U.S.

Playing career
- 2008–2012: Stanford
- Position: Guard

Coaching career (HC unless noted)
- 2013–2015: Oklahoma (graduate assistant)
- 2015–2017: Belmont (assistant)
- 2017–2020: Stanford (assistant)
- 2020–present: UNLV

Head coaching record
- Overall: 149–41 (.784)
- Tournaments: 0–3 (NCAA); 1–1 (WBIT)

Accomplishments and honors

Championships
- 3 Mountain West Tournament (2022–2024); 4 Mountain West Regular Season (2022–2025)

Awards
- 3 Mountain West Coach of the Year (2021, 2023, 2025)

Lindy La Rocque (born December 15, 1989) is an American college basketball coach who is currently the head coach of the women's basketball team at the University of Nevada, Las Vegas (UNLV).

== Early life and education ==
La Rocque was born in Las Vegas, Nevada. She graduated from Durango High School in Las Vegas in 2008. At Durango, La Rocque played at shooting guard. With her strengths being in scoring and three-point shooting, La Rocque won Nevada All-State honors in all four years, second team honors in 2005 and 2006 then first team honors in 2007 and 2008. With a 4.7 GPA, La Rocque was the valedictorian of her high school class.

ESPN graded La Rocque 70 points out of 100 as a high school recruit. On November 14, 2007, La Rocque signed her letter of intent to play college basketball for Stanford. Playing under head coach Tara VanDerveer from 2008 to 2012, La Rocque played 138 games with 43 starts, averaging 3.1 points, 0.9 rebounds, and 1.5 assists in 15.3 minutes per game. La Rocque graduated from Stanford with a bachelor's degree in science, technology, and society, with an emphasis on earth systems, civil and environmental engineering, and calculus.

=== Stanford statistics ===
Legend
| GP | Games played | GS | Games started | MPG | Minutes per game |
| FG% | Field goal percentage | 3P% | 3-point field goal percentage | FT% | Free throw percentage |
| RPG | Rebounds per game | APG | Assists per game | SPG | Steals per game |
| BPG | Blocks per game | PPG | Points per game | **Bold** | Career high |

| Year | Team | GP | Points | FG% | 3P% | FT% | RPG | APG | SPG | BPG | PPG |
|---|---|---|---|---|---|---|---|---|---|---|---|
| 2008–09 | Stanford | **37** | 130 | 31.8% | 31.1% | 50.0% | 0.7 | 1.1 | 0.5 | 0.1 | 3.5 |
| 2009–10 | Stanford | 31 | 38 | 22.4% | 17.9% | 69.2% | 0.8 | 0.6 | 0.1 | 0.0 | 1.2 |
| 2010–11 | Stanford | 33 | **134** | **40.8%** | **38.6%** | **74.1%** | **1.1** | 1.8 | 0.4 | **0.1** | **3.9** |
| 2011–12 | Stanford | 36 | 131 | 27.3% | 24.4% | 42.1% | 1.1 | **2.3** | **0.5** | 0.0 | 3.6 |
| Career | | 138 | 433 | 31.1% | 29.1% | 59.3% | 0.9 | 1.5 | 0.4 | 0.0 | 3.1 |

== Career ==
=== Early coaching career (2013–2020) ===
After graduating from Stanford, La Rocque enrolled at the University of Oklahoma in 2013 and served for two seasons as a graduate assistant for Oklahoma Sooners women's basketball under head coach Sherri Coale. Oklahoma appeared in the 2014 and 2015 NCAA Tournaments. La Rocque graduated from Oklahoma in 2015 with a master's degree in adult and higher education.

From 2015 to 2017, La Rocque was an assistant coach under head coach Cameron Newbauer at Belmont, during which Belmont appeared in the 2016 and 2017 NCAA Tournaments.

Returning to her alma mater, La Rocque was an assistant coach at Stanford from 2017 to 2020 again under VanDerveer. In those three seasons, Stanford went 82–22 (43–10 in Pac-12 games) and appeared in the NCAA Tournament twice, advancing to the Elite Eight in 2019.

=== UNLV (2020–present) ===
On March 18, 2020, the University of Nevada, Las Vegas (UNLV) hired La Rocque to be women's basketball head coach, nearly two weeks after the resignation of previous head coach Kathy Olivier. At the time of her hiring, La Rocque was the second-youngest coach in Division I women's basketball at the age of 30.

In 2021, the Mountain West Conference named La Rocque its Coach of the Year in women's basketball after La Rocque's debut season in which UNLV finished 13–5 in Mountain West play and second in conference standings.

The 2022–23 UNLV team was La Rocque's most successful with a perfect 18–0 record in Mountain West regular season games, the first season where UNLV went undefeated in conference play since going 8–0 in the PCAA in 1984–85. In mid-February 2023, UNLV was ranked no. 23 in the AP Poll, UNLV's first top 25 ranking in that poll since 1994.

== Head coaching record ==
Statistics overview
| Season | Team | Overall | Conference | Standing | Postseason |
|---|---|---|---|---|---|
UNLV Lady Rebels (Mountain West Conference) (2020–present)
| 2020–21 | UNLV | 15–9 | 13–5 | 2nd | |
| 2021–22 | UNLV | 26–7 | 15–3 | 1st | NCAA First Round |
| 2022–23 | UNLV | 31–3 | 18–0 | 1st | NCAA First Round |
| 2023–24 | UNLV | 30–3 | 17–1 | 1st | NCAA First Round |
| 2024–25 | UNLV | 26–8 | 16–2 | 1st | WBIT Second Round |
| 2025–26 | UNLV | 21–11 | 15–5 | T-2nd | |
| UNLV: | | 149–41 (.784) | 94–16 (.855) | | |
| Total: | | 149–41 (.784) | | | |
National champion Postseason invitational champion Conference regular season champion Conference regular season and conference tournament champion Division regular season champion Division regular season and conference tournament champion Conference tournament champion
