= 2023–24 Oklahoma State Cowgirls basketball team =

Intercollegiate basketball season team

2023–24 Oklahoma State Cowgirls basketball
- Conference: Big 12 Conference
- Record: 14–16 (7–11 Big 12)
- Head coach: Jacie Hoyt (2nd season)
- Associate head coach: Jhasmin Player
- Assistant coaches: Ashley Davis; Kelby Jones
- Home arena: Gallagher-Iba Arena

2023–24 Big 12 Conference women's basketball standings
	Conf.				Overall
Team	W		L	PCT	W		L	PCT
No. 21 Oklahoma	15	–	3	.833	23	–	10	.697
No. 7 Texas †	14	–	4	.778	33	–	5	.868
No. 19 Kansas State	13	–	5	.722	26	–	8	.765
No. 25 Iowa State	12	–	6	.667	21	–	12	.636
No. 13 Baylor	12	–	6	.667	26	–	8	.765
No. 24 West Virginia	12	–	6	.667	25	–	8	.758
Kansas	11	–	7	.611	20	–	13	.606
Oklahoma State	7	–	11	.389	14	–	16	.467
TCU	6	–	12	.333	21	–	12	.636
BYU	6	–	12	.333	16	–	17	.485
Cincinnati	5	–	13	.278	14	–	18	.438
Texas Tech	5	–	13	.278	17	–	16	.515
Houston	5	–	13	.278	14	–	16	.467
UCF	3	–	15	.167	12	–	17	.414
† 2024 Big 12 tournament winner Rankings from AP poll

The 2023–24 Oklahoma State Cowgirls basketball team represented Oklahoma State University during the 2023–24 NCAA Division I women's basketball season. They were led by second-year head coach Jacie Hoyt and played their home games at the Gallagher-Iba Arena as members of the Big 12 Conference.

== Previous season ==
The Cowgirls finished the season 21–12 overall and 10–8 in the Big 12 conference to finish in a three-way tie for fourth place. In the Big 12 Tournament, Oklahoma State was a 4th seed, where they defeated West Virginia in the quarterfinals before losing to Texas in the semifinals. They received an at-large bid to the NCAA women's tournament as a No. 8 seed in Greenville region 2, where they lost in the first round to Miami (FL).

== Offseason ==
=== Departures ===
Name	Number	Pos.	Height	Year	Hometown	Reason for departure
Kassidy De Lapp	1	C	6'3"	GS senior	El Dorado Hills, CA	Graduated
Naomie Alnatas	3	G	5'7"	GS senior	Cayenne, French Guiana	Graduated
Claire Chastain	12	G	6'0"	GS senior	Shawnee, OK	Graduated
Taylen Collins	14	F	6'1"	Junior	Muldrow, OK	Transferred to Auburn
Lexy Keys	15	G	5'7"	Junior	Tahequah, OK	Transferred to Oklahoma
Macie James	20	G	5'11"	Sophomore	Fresno, CA	Transferred to UNLV
Terryn Milton	21	G	5'9"	GS senior	Owasso, OK	Graduated
Trinitee Jackson	23	F	6'3"	GS senior	Dallas, TX	Graduated
Makyra Tramble	34	F	5'10"	Senior	Shawnee, OK	Graduate transferred to Oral Roberts

=== Incoming transfers ===
Name	Number	Pos.	Height	Year	Hometown	Previous school
Quincy Noble	0	G	5'10"	GS senior	McKinney, TX	North Texas
Ale'jah Douglas	1	G	5'6"	Senior	Omaha, NE	Clemson
Kennedy Fauntleroy	2	G	5'7"	Sophomore	Upper Marlboro, MD	Georgetown
Chandler Prater	5	G	5'11"	(redshirt) Senior	Kansas City, MO	Kansas
Rylee Langerman	11	G	5'9"	Senior	Norman, OK	Arkansas
Hannah Gusters	21	C	6'5"	Senior	Dallas, TX	LSU
Brianna Jackson	23	F	6'3"	GS senior	Virginia Beach, VA	Old Dominion

==== Recruiting ====
There was no recruiting class of 2023.

== Roster ==
2023–24 Oklahoma State Cowgirls women's basketball team
Players
Coaches

Pos.	#	Name	Height	Year	Previous school	Hometown
G	0	Quincy Noble	5 ft 10 in (1.78 m)	GS	McKinney High School; North Texas	McKinney, TX
G	1	Ale'Jah Douglas	5 ft 6 in (1.68 m)	Sr	Northwest High School; Clemson	Omaha, NE
G	2	Kennedy Fauntleroy	5 ft 7 in (1.7 m)	So	New Hope Academy; Georgetown	Upper Marlboro, MD
G	4	Anna Gret Asi	5 ft 8 in (1.73 m)	Jr	Tartu University; Arizona	Tartu, Estonia
G	5	Chandler Prater	5 ft 11 in (1.8 m)	RS Sr	North Kansas City High School; Kansas	Kansas City, MO
G	11	Rylee Langerman	5 ft 9 in (1.75 m)	Sr	Christian Heritage Academy; Arkansas	Del City, OK
F	12	Lior Garzon	6 ft 1 in (1.85 m)	Sr	Hof HaSharon; Villanova	Ra'anana, Israel
G	15	Brenna Butler	5 ft 6 in (1.68 m)	Fr	Gruver High School	Gruver, TX
C	21	Hannah Gusters	6 ft 5 in (1.96 m)	Sr	MacArthur High School; LSU	Dallas, TX
G	22	Mia Galbraith	5 ft 9 in (1.75 m)	Fr	Lake Travis High School	Sunshine Coast, Australia
F	23	Brianna Jackson	6 ft 3 in (1.91 m)	GS	Princess Anne High School; Old Dominion	Virginia Beach, VA
F	24	Praise Egharevba	6 ft 3 in (1.91 m)	RS Fr	Nottingham Academy	Papenburg, Germany
G	32	Stailee Heard	5 ft 11 in (1.8 m)	Fr	Sapulpa High School	Sapulpa, OK
G	34	Landry Williams	5 ft 9 in (1.75 m)	Jr	Metro Christian Academy	Tulsa, OK

Head coach

- Jacie Hoyt (Wichita State)

Assistant coach(es)

- Jhasmin Player (Baylor)
- Ashley Davis (TCU)
- Kelby Jones (North Texas)

Legend

- (C) Team captain
- (S) Suspended
- (I) Ineligible
- (W) Walk-on
- Injured
- Current redshirt

Roster

== Schedule ==
Date time, TV	Rank^{#}	Opponent^{#}	Result	Record	Site (attendance) city, state
Exhibition
October 31, 2023*; 6:30 p.m.		Oklahoma Christian	W 101–50		Gallagher-Iba Arena; Stillwater, OK
Non-conference regular season
November 6, 2023*; 5:00 p.m., BIG12/ESPN+		SIU Edwardsville	W 100–59	1–0	Gallagher-Iba Arena; Stillwater, OK
November 8, 2023*; 11:00 a.m., BIG12/ESPN+		New Orleans	W 74–66	2–0	Gallagher-Iba Arena (3,204); Stillwater, OK
November 12, 2023*; 5:00 p.m., P12N		at No. 20 Colorado	L 75–86	2–1	CU Events Center (3,931); Boulder, CO
November 20, 2023*; 5:30 p.m., FloSports		vs. Penn State; Baha Mar Pink Flamingo Championship	L 80–89	2–2	Baha Mar Convention Center (364); Nassau, Bahamas
November 22, 2023*; 5:30 p.m., FloSports		vs. No. 15 Ohio State; Baha Mar Pink Flamingo Championship	L 57–75	2–3	Baha Mar Convention Center; Nassau, Bahamas
November 26, 2023*; 2:00 p.m., BIG12/ESPN+		Missouri State	W 82–51	3–3	Gallagher-Iba Arena (2,009); Stillwater, OK
December 3, 2023*; 1:00 p.m., BIG12/ESPN+		Wyoming	W 78–62	4–3	Gallagher-Iba Arena (1,862); Stillwater, OK
December 9, 2023*; 2:00 p.m., BIG12/ESPN+		Texas State	W 67–52	5–3	Gallagher-Iba Arena (1,753); Stillwater, OK
December 17, 2023*; 1:00 p.m., BIG12/ESPN+		Southern Illinois	W 76–58	6–3	Gallagher-Iba Arena (2,001); Stillwater, OK
December 20, 2023*; 3:00 p.m., ESPN+		at Utah Tech; Trailblazer Classic	W 87–61	7–3	Burns Arena (417); St. George, UT
December 21, 2023*; 3:00 p.m., ESPN+		vs. Oregon; Trailblazer Classic	L 63–70	7–4	Burns Arena (301); St. George, UT
Big 12 Conference regular season
December 30, 2023; 2:00 p.m., BIG12/ESPN+		Iowa State	L 68–76	7–5 (0–1)	Gallagher-Iba Arena (2,770); Stillwater, OK
January 3, 2024; 5:00 p.m., BIG12/ESPN+		at UCF	W 68–61	8–5 (1–1)	Addition Financial Arena (1,230); Orlando, FL
January 6, 2024; 4:00 p.m., BIG12/ESPN+		at No. 23 TCU	W 67–59	9–5 (2–1)	Schollmaier Arena (2,869); Fort Worth, TX
January 10, 2024; 6:30 p.m., BIG12/ESPN+		Texas Tech	W 71–58	10–5 (3–1)	Gallagher-Iba Arena (1,947); Stillwater, OK
January 13, 2024; 6:30 p.m., BIG12/ESPN+		at Kansas	L 64–70	10–6 (3–2)	Allen Fieldhouse (3,204); Lawrence, KS
January 17, 2024; 6:30 p.m., BIG12/ESPN+		BYU	W 82–50	11–6 (4–2)	Gallagher-Iba Arena (2,044); Stillwater, OK
January 20, 2024; 2:00 p.m., BIG12/ESPN+		No. 11 Texas	L 66–76	11–7 (4–3)	Gallagher-Iba Arena (3,405); Stillwater, OK
January 24, 2024; 5:00 p.m., BIG12/ESPN+		at Cincinnati	L 56–58	11–8 (4–4)	Fifth Third Arena (1,392); Cincinnati, OH
January 28, 2024; 1:00 p.m., ESPNU		No. 13 Baylor	L 60–72	11–9 (4–5)	Gallagher-Iba Arena (2,437); Stillwater, OK
January 31, 2024; 6:30 p.m., BIG12/ESPN+		at Iowa State	L 67–78	11–10 (4–6)	Hilton Coliseum (9,962); Ames, IA
February 3, 2024; 4:00 p.m., BIG12/ESPN+		Oklahoma; Bedlam Series	L 74–81	11–11 (4–7)	Gallagher-Iba Arena (5,326); Stillwater, OK
February 10, 2024; 4:00 p.m., BIG12/ESPN+		at No. 8 Kansas State	L 68–69	11–12 (4–8)	Bramlage Coliseum (6,848); Manhattan, KS
February 14, 2024; 6:00 p.m., BIG12/ESPN+		at Texas Tech	W 60–50	12–12 (5–8)	United Supermarkets Arena (5,063); Lubbock, TX
February 17, 2024; 4:00 p.m., BIG12/ESPN+		Houston	L 57–65	12–13 (5–9)	Gallagher-Iba Arena (2,112); Stillwater, OK
February 21, 2024; 6:30 p.m., BIG12/ESPN+		UCF	W 67–54	13–13 (6–9)	Gallagher-Iba Arena (1,819); Stillwater, OK
February 24, 2024; 1:00 p.m., FOX		at No. 23 Oklahoma; Bedlam Series	L 56–91	13–14 (6–10)	Lloyd Noble Center (8,059); Norman, OK
February 27, 2024; 6:30 p.m., BIG12/ESPN+		No. 24т West Virginia	W 68–61	14–14 (7–10)	Gallagher-Iba Arena (1,847); Stillwater, OK
March 3, 2024; 11:00 a.m., ESPN2		at No. 21 Baylor	L 45–67	14–15 (7–11)	Foster Pavilion (4,280); Waco, TX
Big 12 Conference Tournament
March 8, 2024; 1:30 p.m., ESPN+	(8)	vs. (9) TCU; Second Round	L 66–68	14–16	T-Mobile Center (3,730); Kansas City, MO
*Non-conference game. ^{#}Rankings from AP Poll. (#) Tournament seedings in parentheses. All times are in Central Time.

== See also ==
- 2023–24 Oklahoma State Cowboys basketball team
