= 2023–24 Houston Cougars women's basketball team =

Intercollegiate basketball season team

2023–24 Houston Cougars women's basketball
- Conference: Big 12 Conference
- Record: 14–16 (5–13 Big 12)
- Head coach: Ronald Hughey (10th season)
- Associate head coach: Tai Dillard; Vonn Read
- Assistant coach: Chynna Grimes
- Home arena: Fertitta Center

2023–24 Big 12 Conference women's basketball standings
	Conf.				Overall
Team	W		L	PCT	W		L	PCT
No. 21 Oklahoma	15	–	3	.833	23	–	10	.697
No. 7 Texas †	14	–	4	.778	33	–	5	.868
No. 19 Kansas State	13	–	5	.722	26	–	8	.765
No. 25 Iowa State	12	–	6	.667	21	–	12	.636
No. 13 Baylor	12	–	6	.667	26	–	8	.765
No. 24 West Virginia	12	–	6	.667	25	–	8	.758
Kansas	11	–	7	.611	20	–	13	.606
Oklahoma State	7	–	11	.389	14	–	16	.467
TCU	6	–	12	.333	21	–	12	.636
BYU	6	–	12	.333	16	–	17	.485
Cincinnati	5	–	13	.278	14	–	18	.438
Texas Tech	5	–	13	.278	17	–	16	.515
Houston	5	–	13	.278	14	–	16	.467
UCF	3	–	15	.167	12	–	17	.414
† 2024 Big 12 tournament winner Rankings from AP poll

The 2023–24 Houston Cougars women's basketball team represented the University of Houston during the 2023–24 NCAA Division I women's basketball season. The Cougars were led by tenth-year head coach Ronald Hughey and played their home games at the Fertitta Center as members of the Big 12 Conference.

== Previous season ==
The Cougars finished the 2022–23 season 15–16, 10–5 in AAC play to finish in fourth place. As a No. 4 seed in the AAC women's tournament advanced in the quarterfinals, they defeated No. 5 seed SMU and No. 8 Wichita State in the semifinals before losing in the championship game to No. 3 East Carolina.

== Offseason ==
=== Departures ===
Houston departures
Name	Number	Pos.	Height	Year	Hometown	Reason for departure
Tiara Young	2	G	5'9"	Senior	Shreveport, LA	Graduate transferred to SMU
Tae'Lor Purvis	4	G	5'7"	Junior	Houston, TX	Transferred to Xavier
Taryn Johnson	5	G	5'8"	Freshman	San Diego, CA	
De'Myla Brown	15	G	5'7"	Senior	North Little Rock, AR	Graduate transferred to Missouri
Kendall Brown	21	G	5'7"	Sophomore	DeSoto, TX	Transferred to Prairie View A&M
Ca'Leyah Burrell	25	G	5'8"	Senior	Waco, TX	Graduated
Tatyana Hill	30	F	6'2"	GS senior	Houston, TX	Graduated

=== Incoming ===
Houston incoming transfers
Name	Num	Pos.	Height	Year	Hometown	Previous school
Gigi Cooke	3	G	5'9"	Sophomore	Clinton, MD	Maryland
N'Yah Boyd	5	G	5'6"	Senior	Mesquite, TX	UTEP
Maliyah Johnson	21	F	6'0"	Junior	Columbus, OH	Pittsburgh
Djessira Diawara	30	F	6'3"	Senior	Bamako, Mali	Clarendon College
Shalexxus Aaron	35	G	6'1"	(redshirt) Senior	Apple Valley, CA	Oregon State
Peyton McFarland	42	F	6'4"	Junior	Boise, ID	Utah

==== Recruiting ====
There was no recruiting class of 2023.

== Roster ==
2023–24 Houston Cougars women's basketball team
Players
Coaches

Pos.	#	Name	Height	Year	Previous school	Hometown
F	1	Bria Patterson	5 ft 11 in (1.8 m)	GS	DeSoto	DeSoto, TX
G	2	Kierra Merchant	5 ft 7 in (1.7 m)	Fr	Westfield	Spring, TX
G	3	Gia Cooke	5 ft 9 in (1.75 m)	So	Bishop McNamara; Maryland	Clinton, MD
G	5	N'Yah Boyd	5 ft 6 in (1.68 m)	GS	Horn; UTEP	Mesquite, TX
G	10	Britney Onyeje	5 ft 9 in (1.75 m)	GS	Pflugerville; UCF	Pflugerville, TX
G	11	Ash'a Thompson	5 ft 10 in (1.78 m)	Sr	DeSoto; Old Dominion	DeSoto, TX
G	14	Laila Blair	5 ft 8 in (1.73 m)	Sr	Waller	Houston, TX
F	21	Maliyah Johnson	6 ft 0 in (1.83 m)	Jr	Africentric Early College; Pittsburgh	Columbus, OH
F	22	Avalon Miller	6 ft 3 in (1.91 m)	Sr	Riverton; Gulf Coast State College	Salt Lake City, UT
F	30	Djessira Diawara	6 ft 3 in (1.91 m)	Sr	Massa Makan Diabaté; Clarendon College	Bamako, Mali
G	32	Amari Conn	5 ft 7 in (1.7 m)	Sr	Lincoln Prep; Little Rock	Kansas City, MO
F	33	Logyn McNeil	6 ft 3 in (1.91 m)	RS So	Rockwall-Heath; LSU	Rockwall, TX
F	34	Kamryn Jones	6 ft 1 in (1.85 m)	Sr	Magnolia West	Magnolia, TX
G	35	Shalexxus Aaron	6 ft 1 in (1.85 m)	RS Sr	Martin Luther King; Oregon State	Apple Valley, CA
F	42	Peyton McFarland	6 ft 4 in (1.93 m)	Sr	Boise; Utah	Boise, ID

Head coach

- Ronald Hughey (Limestone College)

Assistant coach(es)

- Tai Dillard (Texas)
- Vonn Read (Clark Atlanta)
- Chynna Grimes (Wichita State)

Legend

- (C) Team captain
- (S) Suspended
- (I) Ineligible
- (W) Walk-on
- Injured
- Current redshirt

Roster

== Schedule ==
Date time, TV	Rank^{#}	Opponent^{#}	Result	Record	Site (attendance) city, state
Non-conference regular season
November 10, 2023*; 7:00 p.m., BIG12/ESPN+		Air Force	W 99–61	1–0	Fertitta Center (935); Houston, TX
November 14, 2023*; 7:00 p.m., BIG12/ESPN+		Sam Houston	W 106–65	2–0	Fertitta Center (964); Houston, TX
November 19, 2023*; 2:00 p.m., BIG12/ESPN+		Grambling State	W 106–74	3–0	Fertitta Center (897); Houston, TX
November 26, 2023*; 2:00 p.m., BIG12/ESPN+		New Orleans	W 81–54	4–0	Fertitta Center (1,139); Houston, TX
November 29, 2023*; 7:00 p.m., BIG12/ESPN+		Middle Tennessee	L 45–70	4–1	Fertitta Center (698); Houston, TX
December 3, 2023*; 2:00 p.m., BIG12/ESPN+		Florida A&M	W 79–59	5–1	Fertitta Center (1,160); Houston, TX
December 8, 2023*; 7:00 p.m., ESPN+		at Texas A&M–Commerce	W 86–53	6–1	The Field House (1,189); Commerce, TX
December 12, 2023*; 11:00 a.m., BIG12/ESPN+		Texas Southern	W 89–42	7–1	Fertitta Center (3,658); Houston, TX
December 14, 2023*; 6:00 p.m., ESPN+		at UTSA	W 66–64	8–1	Convocation Center (869); San Antonio, TX
December 17, 2023*; 4:00 p.m., P12N		at Washington State	L 48–95	8–2	Beasley Coliseum (956); Pullman, WA
December 20, 2023*; 1:00 p.m., BIG12/ESPN+		Rice rivalry	W 71–63 ^{OT}	9–2	Fertitta Center (1,033); Houston, TX
Big 12 Conference regular season
December 30, 2023; 1:00 p.m., BIG12/ESPN+		Texas Tech	L 71–79	9–3 (0–1)	Fertitta Center (1,975); Houston, TX
January 3, 2024; 6:30 p.m., BIG12/ESPN+		at No. 11 Kansas State	L 38–72	9–4 (0–2)	Bramlage Coliseum (3,397); Manhattan, KS
January 6, 2024; 2:00 p.m., BIG12/ESPN+		at No. 6 Baylor	L 58–87	9–5 (0–3)	Foster Pavilion (4,530); Waco, TX
January 10, 2024; 7:00 p.m., BIG12/ESPN+		BYU	W 79–69	10–5 (1–3)	Fertitta Center (805); Houston, TX
January 13, 2024; 2:00 p.m., BIG12/ESPN+		TCU	W 77–66	11–5 (2–3)	Fertitta Center (1,635); Houston, TX
January 17, 2024; 6:00 p.m., BIG12/ESPN+		at West Virginia	L 39–80	11–6 (2–4)	WVU Coliseum (2,251); Morgantown, WV
January 20, 2024; 6:00 p.m., BIG12/ESPN+		Oklahoma	L 65–71	11–7 (2–5)	Fertitta Center (1,780); Houston, TX
January 24, 2024; 6:00 p.m., BIG12/ESPN+		at Texas Tech	L 48–66	11–8 (2–6)	United Supermarkets Arena (4,775); Lubbock, TX
January 27, 2024; 1:00 p.m., BIG12/ESPN+		at UCF	L 87–92 ^{OT}	11–9 (2–7)	Addition Financial Arena (1,092); Orlando, FL
January 30, 2024; 7:00 p.m., BIG12/ESPN+		Cincinnati	W 54–46	12–9 (3–7)	Fertitta Center (974); Houston, TX
February 4, 2024; 2:00 p.m., BIG12/ESPN+		No. 13 Baylor	L 60–83	12–10 (3–8)	Fertitta Center (2,069); Houston, TX
February 8, 2024; 6:30 p.m., BIG12/ESPN+		at Kansas	L 52–69	12–11 (3–9)	Allen Fieldhouse (3,090); Lawrence, KS
February 14, 2024; 7:00 p.m., BIG12/ESPN+		No. 5 Texas	L 66–82	12–12 (3–10)	Fertitta Center (1,610); Houston, TX
February 17, 2024; 4:00 p.m., BIG12/ESPN+		at Oklahoma State	W 65–57	13–12 (4–10)	Gallagher-Iba Arena (2,112); Stillwater, OK
February 21, 2024; 7:00 p.m., BIG12/ESPN+		Iowa State	L 64–76	13–13 (4–11)	Fertitta Center (995); Houston, TX
February 24, 2024; 6:00 p.m., BIG12/ESPN+		at TCU	L 49–59	13–14 (4–12)	Schollmaier Arena (2,133); Fort Worth, TX
February 28, 2024; 8:00 p.m., BIG12/ESPN+		at BYU	L 54–64	13–15 (4–13)	Marriott Center (1,760); Provo, UT
March 2, 2024; 7:00 p.m., BIG12/ESPN+		UCF	W 68–67	14–15 (5–13)	Fertitta Center (1,141); Houston, TX
Big 12 Conference Tournament
March 7, 2024; 5:30 p.m., ESPN+	(13)	vs. (12) Texas Tech; First Round	L 60–74	14–16	T-Mobile Center; Kansas City, MO
*Non-conference game. ^{#}Rankings from AP Poll. (#) Tournament seedings in parentheses. All times are in Central Time.

== See also ==
- 2023–24 Houston Cougars men's basketball team
