= 2023–24 Kansas State Wildcats women's basketball team =

Women's college basketball season

2023–24 Kansas State Wildcats women's basketball

NCAA tournament, Second Round
- Conference: Big 12 Conference

Ranking
- Coaches: No. 18
- AP: No. 19
- Record: 26–8 (13–5 Big 12)
- Head coach: Jeff Mittie (10th season)
- Assistant coaches: Ebony Gilliam; Ebony Haliburton; Staci Gregorio
- Home arena: Bramlage Coliseum

2023–24 Big 12 Conference women's basketball standings
	Conf.				Overall
Team	W		L	PCT	W		L	PCT
No. 21 Oklahoma	15	–	3	.833	23	–	10	.697
No. 7 Texas †	14	–	4	.778	33	–	5	.868
No. 19 Kansas State	13	–	5	.722	26	–	8	.765
No. 25 Iowa State	12	–	6	.667	21	–	12	.636
No. 13 Baylor	12	–	6	.667	26	–	8	.765
No. 24 West Virginia	12	–	6	.667	25	–	8	.758
Kansas	11	–	7	.611	20	–	13	.606
Oklahoma State	7	–	11	.389	14	–	16	.467
TCU	6	–	12	.333	21	–	12	.636
BYU	6	–	12	.333	16	–	17	.485
Cincinnati	5	–	13	.278	14	–	18	.438
Texas Tech	5	–	13	.278	17	–	16	.515
Houston	5	–	13	.278	14	–	16	.467
UCF	3	–	15	.167	12	–	17	.414
† 2024 Big 12 tournament winner Rankings from AP poll

The 2023–24 Kansas State Wildcats women's basketball team represented Kansas State University in the 2023–24 NCAA Division I women's basketball season. The Wildcats were led by tenth-year head coach Jeff Mittie. They played their home games at Bramlage Coliseum in Manhattan, Kansas, and were members of the Big 12 Conference.

The Wildcats advanced to the NCAA Tournament, hosting the first two rounds at Bramlage Coliseum for the first time since 2017. After defeating 13-seed Portland in the first round, K-State was defeated by 5-seed Colorado in the second round to end their season.

== Previous season ==
They finished the season 19–17, 5–13 in Big 12 play and finished ninth in the conference. As the ninth seed in the Big 12 Tournament, they played in the first round and beat the eighth seed Texas Tech 79–69, but were defeated by the number one seed Texas in the quarterfinals by a score of 42–60. The Wildcats earned an at-large bid to the WNIT. The Wildcats' first round opponent was against Wichita State and beat them 90–56. In the second round, they played against Wyoming and beat them 71–55 to reach the Super 16 of the WNIT. In the Super 16, the Wildcats would lose to Washington 55–48.

== Offseason ==
=== Departures ===
Kansas State departures
Name	Number	Pos.	Height	Year	Hometown	Reason for departure
Sarah Shematsi	1	F	6'2"	GS senior	Annecy, France	Graduated
Mimi Gatewood	23	G	5'6"	Freshman	Glenn Heights, TX	Transferred to Stephen F. Austin
Emilee Ebert	24	G	6'0"	Senior	Frankfort, KS	Graduated
Taylor Lauterbach	41	C	6'7"	Junior	Appleton, WI	Transferred to Virginia

=== Incoming ===
Kansas State incoming transfers
Name	Num	Pos.	Height	Year	Hometown	Previous School
Zyanna Walker	1	G	5'8"	(redshirt) Freshman	Wichita, KS	Louisville
Imani Lester	32	F	6'3"	Sophomore	Raleigh, NC	Louisville

==== Recruiting ====
There was no recruiting class of 2023.

== Roster ==
2023–24 Kansas State Wildcats women's basketball team
Players
Coaches

Pos.	#	Name	Height	Year	Previous school	Hometown
G	1	Zyanna Walker	5 ft 8 in (1.73 m)	RS Fr	Wichita Heights High School; Louisville	Wichita, KS
G	2	Ka'Mia Harris	5 ft 8 in (1.73 m)	RS Fr	DeSoto High School	Lancaster, TX
G	3	Jaelyn Glenn	6 ft 1 in (1.85 m)	Jr	The Barstow School	Kansas City, MO
G	4	Serena Sundell	6 ft 1 in (1.85 m)	Jr	Maryville	Maryville, MO
G	5	Brylee Glenn	6 ft 0 in (1.83 m)	Jr	The Barstow School	Kansas City, MO
G	10	Mikayla Parks	5 ft 9 in (1.75 m)	So	Norman High School	Norman, OK
G	11	Taryn Sides	5 ft 6 in (1.68 m)	Fr	Phillipsburg High School	Phillipsburg, KS
G	12	Gabby Gregory	6 ft 0 in (1.83 m)	GS	Holland Hall School; Oklahoma	Tulsa, OK
G	14	Rebekah Dallinger	5 ft 9 in (1.75 m)	Sr	Narrabeen Sports High School; Miles Community College	Sydney, Australia
C	15	Heavenly Greer	6 ft 3 in (1.91 m)	RS Jr	Ganesha High School; Oklahoma	Phoenix, AZ
F	21	Eliza Maupin	6 ft 3 in (1.91 m)	So	Webster Groves High School	Webster Groves, MO
F	30	Gisela Sanchez	6 ft 3 in (1.91 m)	RS So	Segle XXI; Arizona	Barcelona, Spain
F	32	Imani Lester	6 ft 4 in (1.93 m)	RS Fr	North Raleigh Christian Academy; Louisville	Raleigh, NC
F	35	Alexis Hess	6 ft 1 in (1.85 m)	Fr	Fleetwood Area High School	Blandon, PA
C	50	Ayoka Lee	6 ft 6 in (1.98 m)	GS	Byron	Byron, MN

Head coach

- Jeff Mittie (Missouri Western)

Assistant coach(es)

- Ebony Gilliam (TCU)
- Ebony Haliburton (Oral Roberts)
- Staci Gregorio (San Diego Mesa College)

Legend

- (C) Team captain
- (S) Suspended
- (I) Ineligible
- (W) Walk-on
- Injured
- Current redshirt

Roster

== Schedule and results ==
Date time, TV	Rank^{#}	Opponent^{#}	Result	Record	Site (attendance) city, state
Exhibition
November 3, 2023*; 6:30 pm, ESPN+		Pittsburg State	W 79–65	–	Bramlage Coliseum (2,919); Manhattan, KS
Non-conference regular season
November 6, 2023*; 6:30 pm, ESPN+		Presbyterian	W 69–35	1–0	Bramlage Coliseum (2,868); Manhattan, KS
November 11, 2023*; 1:00 pm, ESPN+		at Little Rock	W 77–39	2–0	Jack Stephens Center (756); Little Rock, AR
November 16, 2023*; 7:30 pm, FS1		at No. 2 Iowa	W 65–58	3–0	Carver-Hawkeye Arena (14,998); Iowa City, IA
November 19, 2023*; 4:00 pm, ESPN+		Wisconsin	W 75–57	4–0	Bramlage Coliseum (5,424); Manhattan, KS
November 24, 2023*; 10:00 am, FloHoops	No. 16	vs. Western Kentucky; Gulf Coast Showcase First Round	W 77–61	5–0	Hertz Arena (312); Estero, FL
November 25, 2023*; 4:00 pm, FloHoops	No. 16	vs. No. 18 North Carolina; Gulf Coast Showcase Semifinals	W 63–56	6–0	Hertz Arena (2,207); Estero, FL
November 26, 2023*; 6:30 p.m., FloHoops	No. 16	vs. No. 5 Iowa; Gulf Coast Showcase Championship	L 70–77	6–1	Hertz Arena (3,007); Estero, FL
December 1, 2023*; 6:30 pm, ESPN+	No. 14	Jackson State	W 79–37	7–1	Bramlage Coliseum (3,236); Manhattan, KS
December 6, 2023*; 6:30 pm, ESPN+	No. 13	McNeese	W 101–39	8–1	Bramlage Coliseum (3,245); Manhattan, KS
December 9, 2023*; 5:00 pm	No. 13	vs. Missouri; Bill Snyder Classic	W 84–56	9–1	Civic Arena (3,500); St. Joseph, MO
December 16, 2023*; 4:00 pm, ESPN+	No. 12т	North Florida	W 79–53	10–1	Bramlage Coliseum (3,419); Manhattan, KS
December 18, 2023*; 6:30 pm, ESPN+	No. 12	Oral Roberts	W 102–59	11–1	Bramlage Coliseum (2,935); Manhattan, KS
December 20, 2023*; 6:30 pm, ESPN+	No. 12	Southern	W 84–52	12–1	Bramlage Coliseum (3,191); Manhattan, KS
Conference regular season
December 30, 2023; 1:00 pm, ESPN+	No. 11	at Cincinnati	W 66–41	13–1 (1–0)	Fifth Third Arena (1,472); Cincinnati, OH
January 3, 2024; 6:30 pm, ESPN+	No. 11	Houston	W 72–38	14–1 (2–0)	Bramlage Coliseum (3,397); Manhattan, KS
January 6, 2024; 1:00 pm, ESPN+	No. 11	at UCF	W 72–56	15–1 (3–0)	Addition Financial Arena (1,154); Orlando, FL
January 10, 2024; 6:00 pm, ESPNU	No. 12	Oklahoma	W 74–57	16–1 (4–0)	Bramlage Coliseum (3,889); Manhattan, KS
January 13, 2024; 1:00 pm, ESPNU	No. 12	No. 10 Texas	W 61–58	17–1 (5–0)	Bramlage Coliseum (7,062); Manhattan, KS
January 17, 2024; 6:30 pm, ESPN+	No. 7	at TCU	W 2–0 Forfeit	17–1 (6–0)	Schollmaier Arena; Fort Worth, TX
January 20, 2024; 1:00 pm, ESPN+	No. 7	Kansas; Sunflower Showdown	W 69–58	18–1 (7–0)	Bramlage Coliseum (9,602); Manhattan, KS
January 22, 2024; 7:30 pm, FS1	No. 4	at No. 13 Baylor	W 58–55	19–1 (8–0)	Foster Pavilion (4,536); Waco, TX
January 27, 2024; 4:00 pm, ESPN+	No. 4	BYU	W 68–65	20–1 (9–0)	Bramlage Coliseum (8,180); Manhattan, KS
January 31, 2024; 6:00 pm, ESPN+	No. 2	at Oklahoma	L 63–66	20–2 (9–1)	Lloyd Noble Center (3,750); Norman, OK
February 4, 2024; 1:00 pm, FS1	No. 2	at No. 13 Texas	L 54–61	20–3 (9–2)	Moody Center (8,325); Austin, TX
February 10, 2024; 4:00 pm, ESPN+	No. 8	Oklahoma State	W 69–68	21–3 (10–2)	Bramlage Coliseum (6,848); Manhattan, KS
February 14, 2024; 6:30 pm, ESPN+	No. 7	at Iowa State	L 93–96 ^{2OT}	21–4 (10–3)	Hilton Coliseum (9,936); Ames, IA
February 17, 2024; 4:00 pm, ESPN+	No. 7	UCF	W 60–58	22–4 (11–3)	Bramlage Coliseum (6,316); Manhattan, KS
February 21, 2024; 6:30 pm, ESPN+	No. 10	No. 22 West Virginia	W 73–64 ^{OT}	23–4 (12–3)	Bramlage Coliseum (4,266); Manhattan, KS
February 25, 2024; 1:00 pm, ESPN2	No. 10	at Kansas; Sunflower Showdown	L 55–58	23–5 (12–4)	Allen Fieldhouse (9,007); Lawrence, KS
February 28, 2024; 6:30 pm, ESPN+	No. 15	Iowa State	L 76–82	23–6 (12–5)	Bramlage Coliseum (5,340); Manhattan, KS
March 2, 2024; 2:00 pm, ESPN+	No. 15	at Texas Tech	W 73–49	24–6 (13–5)	United Supermarkets Arena (4,852); Lubbock, TX
Big 12 tournament
March 9, 2024; 8:00 pm, ESPN+	(3) No. 16	vs. (6) West Virginia; Quarterfinals	W 65–62	25–6	T-Mobile Center (6,610); Kansas City, MO
March 11, 2024; 4:00 pm, ESPN2	(3) No. 16	vs. (2) No. 5 Texas; Semifinals	L 64–71	25–7	T-Mobile Center (5,219); Kansas City, MO
NCAA tournament
March 22, 2024*; 3:30 p.m., ESPNews	(4 A2) No. 15	(13 A2) Portland; First Round	W 78–65	26–7	Bramlage Coliseum (9,642); Manhattan, KS
March 24, 2024*; 1:00 p.m., ESPN	(4 A2) No. 15	(5 A2) No. 17 Colorado; Second Round	L 50–63	26–8	Bramlage Coliseum (10,632); Manhattan, KS
*Non-conference game. ^{#}Rankings from AP Poll. (#) Tournament seedings in parentheses. A2=Albany 2. All times are in Central Time.

== Rankings ==
Ranking movements Legend: ██ Increase in ranking ██ Decrease in ranking RV = Received votes т = Tied with team above or below
	Week																				
Poll	Pre	1	2	3	4	5	6	7	8	9	10	11	12	13	14	15	16	17	18	19	Final
AP	RV	RV	16	14	13	12т	12	11	11	12	7	4	2	8	7	10	15	16	16	15	19
Coaches	RV	RV	22	18	16	16	16	16	12т	12	7	2	2	7	6	9	14	16	16	16	18
