= 2024 Big 12 Conference women's basketball tournament =

American college basketball competition

- Classification: Division I
- Season: 2023–24
- Teams: 14
- Site: T-Mobile Center; Kansas City, Missouri
- Champions: Texas (3rd title)
- Winning coach: Vic Schaefer (2nd title)
- MVP: Madison Booker (Texas)
- Attendance: 33,128
- Television: ESPN+, ESPN2

2023–24 Big 12 Conference women's basketball standings
	Conf.				Overall
Team	W		L	PCT	W		L	PCT
No. 21 Oklahoma	15	–	3	.833	23	–	10	.697
No. 7 Texas †	14	–	4	.778	33	–	5	.868
No. 19 Kansas State	13	–	5	.722	26	–	8	.765
No. 25 Iowa State	12	–	6	.667	21	–	12	.636
No. 13 Baylor	12	–	6	.667	26	–	8	.765
No. 24 West Virginia	12	–	6	.667	25	–	8	.758
Kansas	11	–	7	.611	20	–	13	.606
Oklahoma State	7	–	11	.389	14	–	16	.467
TCU	6	–	12	.333	21	–	12	.636
BYU	6	–	12	.333	16	–	17	.485
Cincinnati	5	–	13	.278	14	–	18	.438
Texas Tech	5	–	13	.278	17	–	16	.515
Houston	5	–	13	.278	14	–	16	.467
UCF	3	–	15	.167	12	–	17	.414
† 2024 Big 12 tournament winner Rankings from AP poll

The 2024 Big 12 Women's Basketball Tournament was a postseason women's basketball tournament for the Big 12 Conference. It was played from March 7–12, 2024, in Kansas City, Missouri at T-Mobile Center. The winner received the conference's automatic bid to the 2024 NCAA Tournament. Due to a major conference realignment that significantly impacted the Big 12, this was the first and only tournament with 14 teams participating. At the beginning of the 2023–24 season, BYU, Cincinnati, Houston, and UCF joined the conference. This was the final appearance in the tournament for Texas and Oklahoma before they joined the Southeastern Conference for the 2024–25 season. The conference increased to have 16 schools in the 2024–25 season, as Arizona, Arizona State, Colorado, and Utah joined the Big 12, respectively from the Pac-12 Conference. The tournament was sponsored by Phillips 66.

== Seeds ==
Because of conference re-alignment, the 2024 was different from those before and after it. The tournament was the first and only one with the 14-team bracket format as the Big 12 expanded to 16 teams in the 2024–25 season. All fourteen teams participated in the tournament. The top ten teams received a first round bye and the top four teams received a double bye, automatically advancing them into the quarterfinals.

Teams were seeded by record within the conference, with a tiebreaker system to seed teams with identical conference records.

Seed	School	Conference Record	Tiebreaker 1	Tiebreaker 2
1	Oklahoma	15–3		
2	Texas	14–4		
3	Kansas State	13–5		
4	Iowa State	12–6	2–1 vs. Baylor/West Virginia	1–0 vs. Baylor
5	Baylor	12–6	2–1 vs. Iowa State/West Virginia	0–1 vs. Iowa State
6	West Virginia	12–6	1–3 vs. Baylor/Iowa State	
7	Kansas	11–7		
8	Oklahoma State	7–11		
9	TCU	6–12	2–0 vs. BYU	
10	BYU	6–12	0–2 vs. TCU	
11	Cincinnati	5–13	2–1 vs. Texas Tech/Houston	
12	Texas Tech	5–13	2–2 vs. Cincinnati/Houston	
13	Houston	5–13	1–2 vs. Cincinnati/Texas Tech	
14	UCF	3–15		

== Schedule ==
The times and networks have been announced.

Game	Time*	Matchup^{#}	Final score	Television	Attendance
First round – Thursday, March 7
1	5:30 pm	No. 12 Texas Tech vs No. 13 Houston	74–60	ESPN+	2,824
2	8:00 pm	No. 11 Cincinnati vs No. 14 UCF	67–62	ESPN+	2,824
Second round – Friday, March 8
3	11:00 a.m.	No. 5 Baylor vs No. 12 Texas Tech	71–60	ESPN+	3,730
4	1:30 p.m.	No. 8 Oklahoma State vs No. 9 TCU	66–68	ESPN+	3,730
5	5:30 p.m.	No. 7 Kansas vs No. 10 BYU	77–53	ESPN+	4,402
6	8:00 p.m.	No. 6 West Virginia vs No. 11 Cincinnati	70–55	ESPN+	4,402
Quarterfinals – Saturday, March 9
7	11:00 a.m.	No. 4 Iowa State vs No. 5 Baylor	67–62	ESPN+	4,963
8	1:30 p.m.	No. 1 Oklahoma vs No. 9 TCU	69–53	ESPN+	4,963
9	5:30 p.m.	No. 2 Texas vs No. 7 Kansas	76–60	ESPN+	6,610
10	8:00 p.m.	No. 3 Kansas State vs No. 6 West Virginia	65–62	ESPN+	6,610
Semifinals – Monday, March 11
11	1:30 p.m.	No. 4 Iowa State vs No. 1 Oklahoma	85–68	ESPN2	5,219
12	4:00 p.m.	No. 2 Texas vs No. 3 Kansas State	71–64	ESPN2	5,219
Championship – Tuesday, March 12
13	8:00 p.m.	No. 4 Iowa State vs No. 2 Texas	53–70	ESPN2	5,380
*Game times in CST. #-Rankings denote tournament seed

== Bracket ==
First round Thursday, March 7 ESPN+
12	Texas Tech	74
13	Houston	60
11	Cincinnati	67
14	UCF	62

Second round Friday, March 8 ESPN+
8	Oklahoma State	66
9	TCU	68
5	#17 Baylor	71
12	Texas Tech	60
7	Kansas	77
10	BYU	53
6	West Virginia	70
11	Cincinnati	55

Quarterfinals; Saturday, March 9 ESPN+
1	#19 Oklahoma	69
9	TCU	53
4	Iowa State	67
5	#17 Baylor	62
2	#6 Texas	76
7	Kansas	60
3	#16 Kansas State	65
6	West Virginia	62

Semifinals; Monday, March 11; ESPN2
1	#17 Oklahoma	68
4	Iowa State	85
2	#5 Texas	71
3	#16 Kansas State	64

Championship; Tuesday, March 12; ESPN2
4	Iowa State	53
2	#5 Texas	70
