= 2023–24 Kansas Jayhawks women's basketball team =

Intercollegiate basketball season team

2023–24 Kansas Jayhawks women's basketball

NCAA tournament, Second Round
- Conference: Big 12 Conference
- Record: 20–13 (11–7 Big 12)
- Head coach: Brandon Schneider (9th season)
- Assistant coaches: Morgan Paige; Karyla Knight; Brock McGinnis; Marqu'es Webb; Patrick Schrater
- Home arena: Allen Fieldhouse

2023–24 Big 12 Conference women's basketball standings
	Conf.				Overall
Team	W		L	PCT	W		L	PCT
No. 21 Oklahoma	15	–	3	.833	23	–	10	.697
No. 7 Texas †	14	–	4	.778	33	–	5	.868
No. 19 Kansas State	13	–	5	.722	26	–	8	.765
No. 25 Iowa State	12	–	6	.667	21	–	12	.636
No. 13 Baylor	12	–	6	.667	26	–	8	.765
No. 24 West Virginia	12	–	6	.667	25	–	8	.758
Kansas	11	–	7	.611	20	–	13	.606
Oklahoma State	7	–	11	.389	14	–	16	.467
TCU	6	–	12	.333	21	–	12	.636
BYU	6	–	12	.333	16	–	17	.485
Cincinnati	5	–	13	.278	14	–	18	.438
Texas Tech	5	–	13	.278	17	–	16	.515
Houston	5	–	13	.278	14	–	16	.467
UCF	3	–	15	.167	12	–	17	.414
† 2024 Big 12 tournament winner Rankings from AP poll

The 2023–24 Kansas Lady Jayhawks basketball team represented the University of Kansas during the 2023–24 NCAA Division I women's basketball season. The Jayhawks were led by ninth-year head coach Brandon Schneider and played their home games at the Allen Fieldhouse as members of the Big 12 Conference.

== Previous season ==
The Jayhawks finished the season 25–11, 9–9 in Big 12 play to finish in seventh place. As the seventh seed in the Big 12 Tournament, they lost to TCU in the first round. They were invited to the WNIT, where they defeated Western Kentucky, Missouri, Nebraska, Arkansas, Washington and Columbia to win the WNIT.

== Offseason ==
=== Departures ===
Kansas departures
Name	Num	Pos.	Height	Year	Hometown	Reason for departure
Mia Vuksic	4	G	5'10"	Junior	Šibenik, Croatia	Transferred to San Francisco
Ioanna Chatzileonti	10	F	6'2"	Junior	Athens, Greece	Transferred to Pittsburgh
Sanna Ström	11	F	6'0"	Sophomore	Luleå, Sweden	Transferred to Colorado State
Katrine Jessen	12	F	6'3"	Junior	Skovlunde, Denmark	Transferred to Missouri State
Breeley Oakley	22	G	5'9"	Junior	Trophy Club, TX	
Chandler Prater	25	G	5'11"	(redshirt) Junior	Kansas City, MO	Transferred to Oklahoma State
Chisom Ajekwu	45	C	6'4"	Senior	Lawrence, KS	Graduated

=== Incoming ===
Kansas incoming transfers
Name	Num	Pos.	Height	Year	Hometown	Previous school
Ryan Cobbins	5	G/F	6'0"	GS senior	Kansas City, KS	Alabama
Skyler Gill	32	G/F	5'11"	Junior	Wichita, KS	North Alabama

==== Recruiting ====
College recruiting
Name	Hometown	School	Height	Weight	Commit date
S'mya Nichols; W	Overland Park, KS	Shawnee Mission West	6 ft 0 in (1.83 m)	N/A	
S'mya Nichols; W	Recruit ratings: ESPN: (95)				
Overall recruit ranking:
Note: In many cases, Scout, Rivals, 247Sports, On3, and ESPN may conflict in their listings of height and weight.; In these cases, the average was taken. ESPN grades are on a 100-point scale.; Sources: "2023 Player Commits". ESPN. Archived from the original on December 13, 2023.

== Roster ==
2023–24 Kansas Jayhawks women's basketball team
Players
Coaches

Pos.	#	Name	Height	Year	Hometown
G	0	Wyvette Mayberry	5 ft 7 in (1.7 m)	Sr	Tulsa, OK
C	1	Taiyanna Jackson	6 ft 6 in (1.98 m)	GS	East Chicago, IN
G/F	5	Ryan Cobbins	6 ft 0 in (1.83 m)	GS	Kansas City, KS
G	6	Laia Conesa	5 ft 11 in (1.8 m)	Fr	Barcelona, Spain
C	7	Paris Gaines	6 ft 3 in (1.91 m)	Fr	Orlando, FL
G	12	S'Mya Nichols	6 ft 0 in (1.83 m)	Fr	Overland Park, KS
G	13	Holly Kersgieter	5 ft 10 in (1.78 m)	GS	Sand Springs, OK
C	14	Danai Papadopoulou	6 ft 4 in (1.93 m)	Jr	Thessaloniki, Greece
G	15	Zakiyah Franklin	5 ft 8 in (1.73 m)	GS	Lakeland, FL
F	23	Zsófia Telegdy	6 ft 3 in (1.91 m)	So	Budapest, Hungary
G/F	25	McKenzie Smith	6 ft 0 in (1.83 m)	Fr	Amarillo, TX
G/F	32	Skyler Gill	5 ft 10 in (1.78 m)	Jr	Wichita, KS
C	33	Nadira Eltayeb	6 ft 4 in (1.93 m)	Sr	Seattle, WA

Head coach

- Brandon Schneider (Wayland Baptist)

Assistant coach(es)

- Morgan Paige (Wisconsin)
- Karyla Knight (Alabama)
- Brock McGinnis (Ottawa)
- Marqu'es Webb (Vanderbilt)
- Patrick Schrater (Kansas)

Legend

- (C) Team captain
- (S) Suspended
- (I) Ineligible
- (W) Walk-on
- Injured
- Current redshirt

Roster

== Schedule ==
Date time, TV	Rank^{#}	Opponent^{#}	Result	Record	Site (attendance) city, state
Non-conference regular season
November 8, 2023*; 6:30 p.m., BIG12/ESPN+		Northwestern State	W 88–46	1–0	Allen Fieldhouse (2,954); Lawrence, KS
November 13, 2023*; 5:00 p.m., BTN		at Penn State	L 85–91	1–1	Bryce Jordan Center (1,938); State College, PA
November 18, 2023*; 3:30 p.m.		vs. Kansas City	W 70–61	2–1	Municipal Auditorium (867); Kansas City, MO
November 24, 2023*; 4:00 p.m., FloSports		vs. No. 9 Virginia Tech; Cayman Islands Classic	L 58–59	2–2	John Gray Gymnasium (1,100); George Town, Cayman Islands
November 25, 2023*; 6:30 p.m., FloSports		vs. No. 6 UConn; Cayman Islands Classic	L 63–71	2–3	John Gray Gymnasium (1,650); George Town, Cayman Islands
November 30, 2023*; 6:30 p.m., BIG12/ESPN+		Southeastern Louisiana	W 67–56	3–3	Allen Fieldhouse (2,483); Lawrence, KS
December 3, 2023*; 1:00 p.m., SECN		at Texas A&M	L 52–63	3–4	Reed Arena (3,950); College Station, TX
December 6, 2023*; 6:30 p.m., BIG12/ESPN+		Houston Christian	W 79–57	4–4	Allen Fieldhouse (2,434); Lawrence, KS
December 10, 2023*; 1:00 p.m., ESPN+		at Wichita State	W 76–56	5–4	Charles Koch Arena (1,991); Wichita, KS
December 16, 2023*; 4:00 p.m., BIG12/ESPN+		Central Arkansas	W 69–48	6–4	Allen Fieldhouse (2,861); Lawrence, KS
December 20, 2023*; 6:30 p.m., BIG12/ESPN+		Nebraska	W 69–52	7–4	Allen Fieldhouse (3,194); Lawrence, KS
Big 12 Conference regular season
December 30, 2023; 12:00 p.m., BIG12/ESPN+		No. 25 West Virginia	L 60–85	7–5 (0–1)	Allen Fieldhouse (3,895); Lawrence, KS
January 3, 2024; 6:30 p.m., BIG12/ESPN+		at Iowa State	L 61–69	7–6 (0–2)	Hilton Coliseum (8,929); Ames, IA
January 6, 2024; 2:00 p.m., BIG12/ESPN+		at Texas Tech	L 64–73	7–7 (0–3)	United Supermarkets Arena (5,747); Lubbock, TX
January 10, 2024; 6:30 p.m., BIG12/ESPN+		No. 4 Baylor	W 87–66	8–7 (1–3)	Allen Fieldhouse (2,971); Lawrence, KS
January 13, 2024; 6:30 p.m., BIG12/ESPN+		Oklahoma State	W 70–64	9–7 (2–3)	Allen Fieldhouse (3,204); Lawrence, KS
January 16, 2024; 7:00 p.m., LHN		at No. 11 Texas	L 56–91	9–8 (2–4)	Moody Center (4,837); Austin, TX
January 20, 2024; 1:00 p.m., BIG12/ESPN+		at No. 24 Kansas State; Sunflower Showdown	L 58–69	9–9 (2–5)	Bramlage Coliseum (9,602); Manhattan, KS
January 24, 2024; 6:30 p.m., BIG12/ESPN+		Iowa State	W 60–58	10–9 (3–5)	Allen Fieldhouse (3,157); Lawrence, KS
January 27, 2024; 6:00 p.m., ESPN+		at Oklahoma	L 65–68	10–10 (3–6)	Lloyd Noble Center (4,036); Norman, OK
January 31, 2024; 6:30 p.m., BIG12/ESPN+		BYU	W 67–53	11–10 (4–6)	Allen Fieldhouse (2,964); Lawrence, KS
February 3, 2024; 6:00 p.m., BIG12/ESPN+		at TCU	W 81–74	12–10 (5–6)	Schollmaier Arena (2,961); Fort Worth, TX
February 8, 2024; 6:30 p.m., BIG12/ESPN+		Houston	W 69–52	13–10 (6–6)	Allen Fieldhouse (3,090); Lawrence, KS
February 14, 2024; 6:30 p.m., BIG12/ESPN+		Cincinnati	W 75–60	14–10 (7–6)	Allen Fieldhouse (2,872); Lawrence, KS
February 17, 2024; 5:00 p.m., BIG12/ESPN+		at BYU	W 70–62	15–10 (8–6)	Marriott Center (2,317); Provo, UT
February 21, 2024; 7:00 p.m., BIG12/ESPN+		at No. 24 Baylor	L 61–69	15–11 (8–7)	Foster Pavilion (4,238); Waco, TX
February 25, 2024; 1:00 p.m., ESPN2		No. 10 Kansas State; Sunflower Showdown	W 58–55	16–11 (9–7)	Allen Fieldhouse (9,007); Lawrence, KS
February 28, 2024; 5:30 p.m., BIG12/ESPN+		at UCF	W 65–53	17–11 (10–7)	Addition Financial Arena (1,071); Orlando, FL
March 2, 2024; 4:00 p.m., BIG12/ESPN+		No. 20 Oklahoma	W 83–74	18–11 (11–7)	Allen Fieldhouse (4,609); Lawrence, KS
Big 12 Conference Tournament
March 8, 2024; 5:30 p.m., ESPN+	(7)	vs. (10) BYU; Second Round	W 77–53	19–11	T-Mobile Center; Kansas City, MO
March 9, 2024; 5:30 p.m., ESPN+	(7)	vs. (2) No. 6 Texas; Quarterfinals	L 60–76	19–12	T-Mobile Center; Kansas City, MO
NCAA Women's Tournament
March 23, 2024*; 1:00 p.m., ESPNews	(8 P3)	vs. (9 P3) Michigan; First round	W 81–72 ^{OT}	20–12	Galen Center (4,318); Los Angeles, CA
March 25, 2024*; 9:00 p.m., ESPN	(8 P3)	at (1 P3) No. 3 USC; Second round	L 55–73	20–13	Galen Center (8,941); Los Angeles, CA
*Non-conference game. ^{#}Rankings from AP Poll. (#) Tournament seedings in parentheses. P3=Portland 3. All times are in Central Time.

== See also ==
- 2023–24 Kansas Jayhawks men's basketball team
