= 2023–24 UCF Knights women's basketball team =

Intercollegiate basketball season team

2023–24 UCF Knights women's basketball
- Conference: Big 12 Conference
- Record: 12–17 (3–15 Big 12)
- Head coach: Sytia Messer (2nd season)
- Assistant coaches: Mike Carey; Chandler McCabe; Tasha Taylor
- Home arena: Addition Financial Arena

2023–24 Big 12 Conference women's basketball standings
	Conf.				Overall
Team	W		L	PCT	W		L	PCT
No. 21 Oklahoma	15	–	3	.833	23	–	10	.697
No. 7 Texas †	14	–	4	.778	33	–	5	.868
No. 19 Kansas State	13	–	5	.722	26	–	8	.765
No. 25 Iowa State	12	–	6	.667	21	–	12	.636
No. 13 Baylor	12	–	6	.667	26	–	8	.765
No. 24 West Virginia	12	–	6	.667	25	–	8	.758
Kansas	11	–	7	.611	20	–	13	.606
Oklahoma State	7	–	11	.389	14	–	16	.467
TCU	6	–	12	.333	21	–	12	.636
BYU	6	–	12	.333	16	–	17	.485
Cincinnati	5	–	13	.278	14	–	18	.438
Texas Tech	5	–	13	.278	17	–	16	.515
Houston	5	–	13	.278	14	–	16	.467
UCF	3	–	15	.167	12	–	17	.414
† 2024 Big 12 tournament winner Rankings from AP poll

The 2023–24 UCF Knights women's basketball team represented the University of Central Florida during the 2023–24 NCAA Division I women's basketball season. The Knights were led by second-year head coach Sytia Messer and played their home games at the Addition Financial Arena as members of the Big 12 Conference.

== Previous season ==
The Knights finished the 2022–23 season 14–15, 4–11 in AAC play to finish in tenth place. As a 10th seed in the AAC Women's tournament, they defeated Cincinnati in the first round before losing to Memphis in the quarterfinals.

== Offseason ==
=== Departures ===
Name	Number	Pos.	Height	Year	Hometown	Reason for departure
Kiera Brown	4	G	5'9"	(redshirt) Sophomore	Riviera Beach, FL	
Tiani Abrams	5	G	6'1"	Freshman	Vista, CA	Transferred to Northern Colorado
Becca Ripley	11	G	6'0"	(redshirt) Senior	Stratham, NH	Graduated
Rachel Ranke	12	G	6'1"	GS senior	Burnsville, MN	Graduated
Bryana Hardy	20	F	6'2"	Freshman	Lovejoy, GA	
Ashley Foster	24	G	5'8"	Senior	McDonough, GA	Graduated
Destiny Thomas	33	F	6'2"	Senior	Atlanta, GA	Graduated
Ashton Verhulst	42	F	6'2"	Junior	De Soto, KS	Walk-on; left the team

=== Incoming transfers ===
Name	Number	Pos.	Height	Year	Hometown	Previous school
Kaitlin Peterson	3	G	5'9"	Junior	Eufaula, AL	Indiana
Jayla Kelly	24	C	6'3"	Senior	Chesterfield, MO	Missouri
Mary McMillan	42	G	5'6"	Senior	Apopka, FL	UNC Wilmington

==== Recruiting ====
There was no recruiting class of 2023.

== Roster ==
2023–24 UCF Knights women's basketball team
Players
Coaches

Pos.	#	Name	Height	Year	Previous school	Hometown
G	0	Laila Jewett	5 ft 10 in (1.78 m)	Jr	Bishop Ireton	Woodbridge, VA
G	3	Kaitlin Peterson	5 ft 9 in (1.75 m)	Jr	Eufaula; Indiana	Eufaula, AL
G	10	Mya Burns	6 ft 0 in (1.83 m)	GS	North Augusta; Georgia Southern	North Augusta, SC
F	11	Achol Akot	6 ft 1 in (1.85 m)	Fr	Capital Courts Academy	Ottawa, ON
G	14	Asia Todd	5 ft 9 in (1.75 m)	GS	Clayton; Liberty	Clayton, NC
F	15	Taylor Gibson	6 ft 2 in (1.88 m)	Jr	Bishop McNamara; Michigan	Upper Marlboro, MD
G	21	Timia Ware	5 ft 6 in (1.68 m)	Jr	Whitney Young Magnet; LSU	Chicago, IL
G	22	Sierra Godbolt	5 ft 6 in (1.68 m)	So	Lake Highland Prep	Orlando, FL
F	23	Anzhané Hutton	6 ft 0 in (1.83 m)	Sr	Cedar Hill; Howard	Dallas, TX
C	24	Jayla Kelly	6 ft 3 in (1.91 m)	Sr	Parkway Central; Missouri	Chesterfield, MO
G	30	Morgan Robinson-Nwagwu	5 ft 8 in (1.73 m)	GS	Norcross; Gulf Coast State College	Norcross, GA
C	35	Khyala Ngodu	6 ft 3 in (1.91 m)	Fr	Dillard	Fort Lauderdale, FL
G	42	Mary McMillan	5 ft 6 in (1.68 m)	Sr	Apopka; UNC Wilmington	Apopka, FL

Head coach

- Sytia Messer (Arkansas)

Assistant coach(es)

- Tennille Adams (Arkansas)
- Greg Brown (Lipscomb)
- Michelle Edwards (Iowa)

Legend

- (C) Team captain
- (S) Suspended
- (I) Ineligible
- (W) Walk-on
- Injured
- Current redshirt

Roster

== Schedule ==
Date time, TV	Rank^{#}	Opponent^{#}	Result	Record	Site (attendance) city, state
Non-conference regular season
November 6, 2023*; 6:00 p.m., BIG12/ESPN+		Bethune–Cookman	W 101–63	1–0	Addition Financial Arena (3,225); Orlando, FL
November 13, 2023*; 6:00 p.m., BIG12/ESPN+		Anderson	W 96–73	2–0	Addition Financial Arena (740); Orlando, FL
November 20, 2023*; 7:00 p.m., BIG12/ESPN+		Auburn	W 60–53	3–0	Addition Financial Arena (1,180); Orlando, FL
November 23, 2023*; 3:00 p.m., FloSports		vs. Jackson State; Discover Puerto Rico Classic	W 63–54	4–0	Roberto Clemente Coliseum (250); San Juan, PR
November 24, 2023*; 3:00 p.m., FloSports		vs. St. John's; Discover Puerto Rico Classic	W 61–48	5–0	Roberto Clemente Coliseum (250); San Juan, PR
November 25, 2023*; 5:30 p.m., FloSports		vs. Sacred Heart; Discover Puerto Rico Classic	W 69–58	6–0	Roberto Clemente Coliseum (250); San Juan, PR
December 3, 2023*; 3:00 p.m., BIG12/ESPN+		Campbell	W 42–41	7–0	Addition Financial Arena (1,072); Orlando, FL
December 11, 2023*; 11:00 a.m., BIG12/ESPN+		New Orleans	W 72–45	8–0	Addition Financial Arena (1,238); Orlando, FL
December 18, 2023*; 2:00 p.m., BIG12/ESPN+		Florida Atlantic	L 58–59	8–1	Addition Financial Arena (797); Orlando, FL
December 19, 2023*; 2:00 p.m., BIG12/ESPN+		Morgan State	W 67–41	9–1	Addition Financial Arena (787); Orlando, FL
Big 12 Conference regular season
December 30, 2023; 3:00 p.m., BIG12/ESPN+		at Oklahoma	L 52–69	9–2 (0–1)	Lloyd Noble Center (3,835); Norman, OK
January 3, 2024; 6:00 p.m., BIG12/ESPN+		Oklahoma State	L 61–68	9–3 (0–2)	Addition Financial Arena (1,230); Orlando, FL
January 6, 2024; 2:00 p.m., BIG12/ESPN+		No. 11 Kansas State	L 56–72	9–4 (0–3)	Addition Financial Arena (1,154); Orlando, FL
January 10, 2024; 6:00 p.m., BIG12/ESPN+		at Cincinnati	L 63–64	9–5 (0–4)	Fifth Third Arena (587); Cincinnati, OH
January 13, 2024; 12:00 p.m., BIG12/ESPN+		No. 24 West Virginia	L 59–76	9–6 (0–5)	Addition Financial Arena (1,374); Orlando, FL
January 20, 2024; 3:00 p.m., BIG12/ESPN+		at No. 12 Baylor	L 74–77	9–7 (0–6)	Foster Pavilion (5,089); Waco, TX
January 23, 2024; 7:30 p.m., BIG12/ESPN+		at TCU	L 60–66	9–8 (0–7)	Schollmaier Arena (2,249); Fort Worth, TX
January 27, 2024; 2:00 p.m., BIG12/ESPN+		Houston	W 92–87 ^{OT}	10–8 (1–7)	Addition Financial Arena (1,092); Orlando, FL
January 30, 2024; 7:00 p.m., BIG12/ESPN+		at No. 23 West Virginia	L 43–84	10–9 (1–8)	WVU Coliseum (1,608); Morgantown, WV
February 3, 2024; 12:00 p.m., BIG12/ESPN+		Iowa State	W 71–66	11–9 (2–8)	Addition Financial Arena (1,088); Orlando, FL
February 7, 2024; 6:00 p.m., BIG12/ESPN+		Cincinnati	L 61–67	11–10 (2–9)	Addition Financial Arena (1,108); Orlando, FL
February 10, 2024; 8:00 p.m., BIG12/ESPN+		at Texas Tech	W 69–64	12–10 (3–9)	United Supermarkets Arena (4,511); Lubbock, TX
February 13, 2024; 6:00 p.m., BIG12/ESPN+		BYU	L 60–64	12–11 (3–10)	Addition Financial Arena (849); Orlando, FL
February 17, 2024; 5:00 p.m., BIG12/ESPN+		at No. 7 Kansas State	L 58–60	12–12 (3–11)	Bramlage Coliseum (6,316); Manhattan, KS
February 21, 2024; 6:30 p.m., BIG12/ESPN+		at Oklahoma State	L 54–67	12–13 (3–12)	Gallagher-Iba Arena (1,819); Stillwater, OK
February 24, 2024; 12:00 p.m., BIG12/ESPN+		No. 5 Texas	L 56–87	12–14 (3–13)	Addition Financial Arena (1,621); Orlando, FL
February 28, 2024; 6:00 p.m., BIG12/ESPN+		Kansas	L 53–65	12–15 (3–14)	Addition Financial Arena (1,071); Orlando, FL
March 2, 2024; 7:00 p.m., BIG12/ESPN+		at Houston	L 67–68	12–16 (3–15)	Fertitta Center (1,141); Houston, TX
Big 12 Conference Tournament
March 7, 2024; 9:00 p.m., ESPN+	(14)	vs. (11) Cincinnati; First Round	L 62–67	12–17	T-Mobile Center (2,824); Kansas City, MO
*Non-conference game. ^{#}Rankings from AP Poll. (#) Tournament seedings in parentheses. All times are in Eastern Time.

== See also ==
- 2023–24 UCF Knights men's basketball team
