= 2023–24 Baylor Bears women's basketball team =

Intercollegiate basketball season

2023–24 Baylor Bears women's basketball

NCAA tournament, Sweet Sixteen
- Conference: Big 12 Conference

Ranking
- Coaches: No. 15
- AP: No. 13
- Record: 26–8 (12–6 Big 12)
- Head coach: Nicki Collen (3rd season)
- Associate head coach: Tony Greene
- Assistant coaches: Tari Cummings; Sadie Edwards
- Home arena: Ferrell Center (2023); Foster Pavilion (2024)

2023–24 Big 12 Conference women's basketball standings
	Conf.				Overall
Team	W		L	PCT	W		L	PCT
No. 21 Oklahoma	15	–	3	.833	23	–	10	.697
No. 7 Texas †	14	–	4	.778	33	–	5	.868
No. 19 Kansas State	13	–	5	.722	26	–	8	.765
No. 25 Iowa State	12	–	6	.667	21	–	12	.636
No. 13 Baylor	12	–	6	.667	26	–	8	.765
No. 24 West Virginia	12	–	6	.667	25	–	8	.758
Kansas	11	–	7	.611	20	–	13	.606
Oklahoma State	7	–	11	.389	14	–	16	.467
TCU	6	–	12	.333	21	–	12	.636
BYU	6	–	12	.333	16	–	17	.485
Cincinnati	5	–	13	.278	14	–	18	.438
Texas Tech	5	–	13	.278	17	–	16	.515
Houston	5	–	13	.278	14	–	16	.467
UCF	3	–	15	.167	12	–	17	.414
† 2024 Big 12 tournament winner Rankings from AP poll

The 2023–24 Baylor Bears women's basketball team represented Baylor University during the 2023–24 NCAA Division I women's basketball season. The Bears were led by third-year head coach Nicki Collen and played their 2023 home games at the Ferrell Center and 2024 games at the Foster Pavilion. The Baylor Bears competed as members of the Big 12 Conference.

== Previous season ==
The 2022–23 Baylor Bears women's basketball team finished the 2022–23 season 20–13, 10–8 in Big 12 play to finish in a 3 way tie for fourth place. As the No. 6 seed in the Big 12 tournament, they lost in the quarterfinals to Iowa State. They received an at-large bid to the NCAA women's tournament as a No. 7 seed in the Seattle Region 3, where they defeated Alabama in the first round before losing to UConn in the second round.

== Offseason ==
=== Departures ===
Baylor Departures
Name	Number	Pos.	Height	Year	Hometown	Reason for Departure
Jaden Owens	10	G	5'8"	Senior	Plano, TX	Graduate transferred to TCU
Erika Porter	20	F	6'0	Junior	West Windsor, NJ	Transferred to Bowling Green
Ja'Mee Asberry	21	G	5'5"	GS Senior	Tulsa, OK	Graduated
Kendra Gillispie	25	F	6'2"	Sophomore	Norman, OK	Transferred to Arkansas State
Caitlin Bickle	51	F	6'0"	GS Senior	Cave Creek, AZ	Graduated

=== Incoming ===
Baylor incoming transfers
Name	Num	Pos.	Height	Year	Hometown	Previous School
Denae Fritz	1	G	5'11"	(redshirt) Sophomore	Maryville, TN	Iowa State
Yaya Felder	2	G	5'11"	Junior	Hartford, CT	Ohio
Madison Bartley	3	F	6'3"	Senior	Kettering, OH	Belmont
Jada Walker	11	G	5'7"	Junior	Richmond, VA	Kentucky

==== Recruiting ====
College recruiting information
Name	Hometown	School	Height	Weight	Commit date
Letycia Vasconcelos; P	Montverde, FL	Montverde Academy	6 ft 7 in (2.01 m)	N/A	
Letycia Vasconcelos; P	Recruit ratings: ESPN: (95)				
Overall recruit ranking:
Note: In many cases, Scout, Rivals, 247Sports, On3, and ESPN may conflict in their listings of height and weight.; In these cases, the average was taken. ESPN grades are on a 100-point scale.; Sources: "2024 Player Commits". ESPN. Archived from the original on December 5, 2023.

==== Recruiting class of 2024 ====
College recruiting information (2024)
Name	Hometown	School	Height	Weight	Commit date
Kayla Nelms; F	Miami, FL	Miami Country Day School	6 ft 1 in (1.85 m)	N/A	
Kayla Nelms; F	Recruit ratings: ESPN: (94)				
Ines Goryanova; PG	Daytona Beach, FL	DME Academy	5 ft 8 in (1.73 m)	N/A	
Ines Goryanova; PG	Recruit ratings: ESPN: (92)				
Overall recruit ranking:
Note: In many cases, Scout, Rivals, 247Sports, On3, and ESPN may conflict in their listings of height and weight.; In these cases, the average was taken. ESPN grades are on a 100-point scale.; Sources: "2024 Player Commits". ESPN. Archived from the original on December 5, 2023.

== Roster ==
2023–24 Baylor Bears women's basketball team
Players
Coaches

Pos.	#	Name	Height	Year	Previous school	Hometown
G	1	Denae Fritz	5 ft 11 in (1.8 m)	RS So	Iowa State	Maryville, TN
G	2	Yaya Felder	5 ft 8 in (1.73 m)	Jr	Ohio	Hartford, CT
F	3	Madison Bartley	6 ft 3 in (1.91 m)	Sr	Belmont	Kettering, OH
G	4	Jana Van Gytenbeek	5 ft 7 in (1.7 m)	Sr	Stanford	Greenwood Village, CO
G/F	5	Darianna Littlepage-Buggs	6 ft 1 in (1.85 m)	So	Classen HS	Edmond, OK
G	11	Jada Walker	5 ft 7 in (1.7 m)	Jr	Kentucky	Richmond, VA
F	12	Kyla Abraham	6 ft 3 in (1.91 m)	So	Smithfield HS	Carrollton, VA
G/F	22	Bella Fontleroy	6 ft 0 in (1.83 m)	So	Kickapoo HS	Springfield, MO
G	24	Sarah Andrews	5 ft 6 in (1.68 m)	Sr	MacArthur HS	Irving, TX
C	25	Lety Vasconcelos	6 ft 7 in (2.01 m)	Fr	Montverde Academy	Miguel Calmon, Bahia, Brazil
G	30	Catarina Ferreira	6 ft 0 in (1.83 m)	Sr	Eastern Arizona College	São Paulo, Brazil
G/F	33	Aijha Blackwell	6 ft 0 in (1.83 m)	GS	Missouri	Berkeley, MO
F	44	Dre'una Edwards	6 ft 0 in (1.83 m)	GS	Kentucky	Las Vegas, NV

Head coach

- Nicki Collen (Marquette)

Assistant coach(es)

- Tony Greene (Langston)
- Tari Cummings (Oklahoma State)
- Sadie Edwards (USC)

Legend

- (C) Team captain
- (S) Suspended
- (I) Ineligible
- (W) Walk-on
- Injured
- Current redshirt

Roster

== Schedule ==
Date time, TV	Rank^{#}	Opponent^{#}	Result	Record	Site (attendance) city, state
Exhibition
November 3, 2023*; 6:00 p.m.	No. 19	Hardin-Simmons	W 120–41		Ferrell Center; Waco, TX
Non-conference regular season
November 6, 2023*; 7:00 p.m., ESPN+	No. 19	Southern	W 85–53	1–0	Ferrell Center (3,570); Waco, TX
November 14, 2023*; 6:30 p.m., ESPN+	No. 21	No. 4 Utah; Preseason WNIT	W 84–77	2–0	Ferrell Center (4,808); Waco, TX
November 19, 2023*; 1:00 p.m., ESPN+	No. 21	Harvard	W 81–71	3–0	Ferrell Center (3,812); Waco, TX
November 24, 2023*; 2:00 p.m., ESPN+	No. 14	McNeese	W 124–44	4–0	Ferrell Center (3,713); Waco, TX
November 26, 2023*; 2:00 p.m., ESPN+	No. 14	Alcorn State	W 93–47	5–0	Ferrell Center (3,709); Waco, TX
November 30, 2023*; 7:00 p.m., ESPNU	No. 13	at SMU	W 85–61	6–0	Moody Coliseum (2,294); University Park, TX
December 3, 2023*; 1:00 p.m., FS1	No. 13	Oregon	W 71–51	7–0	Ferrell Center (4,340); Waco, TX
December 14, 2023*; 11:00 a.m., ESPN+	No. 10	Delaware State; Final Game at Farrell Center	W 99–37	8–0	Ferrell Center (9,898); Waco, TX
December 16, 2023*; 4:00 p.m., ESPN+	No. 10	vs. No. 24 Miami (FL); Hall of Fame Series	W 75–57	9–0	Frost Bank Center (2,279); San Antonio, TX
December 20, 2023*; 2:30 p.m., FloSports	No. 10	vs. Providence; West Palm Beach Classic	W 61–36	10–0	Massimino Court (313); West Palm Beach, FL
December 21, 2023*; 2:30 p.m., FloSports	No. 10	vs. South Florida; West Palm Beach Classic	W 73–50	11–0	Massimino Court (452); West Palm Beach, FL
Big 12 Conference regular season
December 30, 2023; 1:00 p.m., FOX	No. 10	at No. 5 Texas	W 85–79	12–0 (1–0)	Moody Center (8,207); Austin, TX
January 3, 2024; 7:00 p.m., ESPN+	No. 6	No. 23 TCU; First Game at Foster Pavilion	W 71–50	13–0 (2–0)	Foster Pavilion (5,905); Waco, TX
January 6, 2024; 2:00 p.m., ESPN+	No. 6	Houston	W 87–58	14–0 (3–0)	Foster Pavilion (4,530); Waco, TX
January 10, 2024; 6:30 p.m., ESPN+	No. 4	at Kansas	L 66–87	14–1 (3–1)	Allen Fieldhouse (2,971); Lawrence, KS
January 13, 2024; 12:00 p.m., ESPN+	No. 4	at Iowa State	L 63–66	14–2 (3–2)	Hilton Coliseum (9,420); Ames, IA
January 20, 2024; 2:00 p.m., ESPN+	No. 12	UCF	W 77–74	15–2 (4–2)	Foster Pavilion (5,089); Waco, TX
January 22, 2024; 7:30 p.m., FS1	No. 13	No. 4 Kansas State	L 55–58	15–3 (4–3)	Foster Pavilion (4,536); Waco, TX
January 28, 2024; 1:00 p.m., ESPNU	No. 13	at Oklahoma State	W 72–60	16–3 (5–3)	Gallagher-Iba Arena (2,437); Stillwater, OK
February 1, 2024; 7:30 p.m., ESPN	No. 13	No. 12 Texas	L 55–67	16–4 (5–4)	Foster Pavilion (6,015); Waco, TX
February 4, 2024; 2:00 p.m., ESPN+	No. 13	at Houston	W 83–60	17–4 (6–4)	Fertitta Center (2,069); Houston, TX
February 7, 2024; 8:00 p.m., ESPN+	No. 18	at BYU	L 66–78	17–5 (6–5)	Marriott Center (1,525); Provo, UT
February 10, 2024; 2:00 p.m., ESPN+	No. 18	No. 22 West Virginia	W 65–58	18–5 (7–5)	Foster Pavilion (4,944); Waco, TX
February 14, 2024; 6:00 p.m., ESPN+	No. 21	at No. 23 Oklahoma	L 73–84	18–6 (7–6)	Lloyd Noble Center (4,552); Norman, OK
February 18, 2024; 3:00 p.m., ESPN2	No. 21	Texas Tech	W 61–32	19–6 (8–6)	Foster Pavilion (7,093); Waco, TX
February 21, 2024; 7:00 p.m., BIG12/ESPN+	No. 24	Kansas	W 69–61	20–6 (9–6)	Foster Pavilion (4,238); Waco, TX
February 24, 2024; 1:00 p.m., ESPN+	No. 24	at No. 22 West Virginia	W 66–65	21–6 (10–6)	WVU Coliseum (5,616); Morgantown, WV
February 27, 2024; 5:00 p.m., ESPN+	No. 21	at Cincinnati	W 74–55	22–6 (11–6)	Fifth Third Arena (1,488); Cincinnati, OH
March 3, 2024; 11:00 a.m., ESPN2	No. 21	Oklahoma State	W 67–45	23–6 (12–6)	Foster Pavilion (4,280); Waco, TX
Big 12 Conference Tournament
March 8, 2024; 11:00 a.m., ESPN+	(5) No. 17	vs. (12) Texas Tech; Second Round	W 71–60	24–6	T-Mobile Center; Kansas City, MO
March 9, 2024; 11:00 a.m., ESPN+	(5) No. 17	vs. (4) Iowa State; Quarterfinals	L 62–67	24–7	T-Mobile Center; Kansas City, MO
NCAA Tournament
March 22, 2024*; 5:00 p.m., ESPNU	(5 P3) No. 19	vs. (12 P3) Vanderbilt; First Round	W 80–63	25–7	Cassell Coliseum (8,925); Blacksburg, VA
March 24, 2024*; 7:00 p.m., ESPN	(5 P3) No. 19	at (4 P3) No. 13 Virginia Tech; Second Round	W 75–72	26–7	Cassell Coliseum (8,925); Blacksburg, VA
March 30, 2024*; 4:30 p.m., ESPN	(5 P3) No. 19	vs. (1 P3) No. 3 USC; Sweet Sixteen	L 70-74	26-8	Moda Center; Portland, OR
*Non-conference game. ^{#}Rankings from AP Poll. (#) Tournament seedings in parentheses. P3=Portland 3. All times are in Central Time.

== Rankings ==
Ranking movements Legend: ██ Increase in ranking ██ Decrease in ranking
	Week																				
Poll	Pre	1	2	3	4	5	6	7	8	9	10	11	12	13	14	15	16	17	18	19	Final
AP	19	21	14	13	10	10	10	10	6	4	12	13	13	18	21	24	21	17	19	19	13
Coaches	20	23	18	16	14	13	11	11	9	7	13	15	13	17	21	24	21	17	18	18	15

== See also ==
- 2023–24 Baylor Bears men's basketball team
