= 2023–24 Cincinnati Bearcats women's basketball team =

Intercollegiate basketball season team

2023–24 Cincinnati Bearcats women's basketball

WNIT, Second Round
- Conference: Big 12 Conference
- Record: 14–18 (5–13 Big 12)
- Head coach: Katrina Merriweather (1st season)
- Assistant coaches: Ashley Barlow; Abby Jump; Kabrina Merriweather
- Home arena: Fifth Third Arena

2023–24 Big 12 Conference women's basketball standings
	Conf.				Overall
Team	W		L	PCT	W		L	PCT
No. 21 Oklahoma	15	–	3	.833	23	–	10	.697
No. 7 Texas †	14	–	4	.778	33	–	5	.868
No. 19 Kansas State	13	–	5	.722	26	–	8	.765
No. 25 Iowa State	12	–	6	.667	21	–	12	.636
No. 13 Baylor	12	–	6	.667	26	–	8	.765
No. 24 West Virginia	12	–	6	.667	25	–	8	.758
Kansas	11	–	7	.611	20	–	13	.606
Oklahoma State	7	–	11	.389	14	–	16	.467
TCU	6	–	12	.333	21	–	12	.636
BYU	6	–	12	.333	16	–	17	.485
Cincinnati	5	–	13	.278	14	–	18	.438
Texas Tech	5	–	13	.278	17	–	16	.515
Houston	5	–	13	.278	14	–	16	.467
UCF	3	–	15	.167	12	–	17	.414
† 2024 Big 12 tournament winner Rankings from AP poll

The 2023–24 Cincinnati Bearcats women's basketball team represented the University of Cincinnati during the 2023–24 NCAA Division I women's basketball season. The Bearcats were led by first-year head coach Katrina Merriweather and played their home games at the Fifth Third Arena as members of the Big 12 Conference.

== Previous season ==
The Bearcats finished the 2022–23 season 9–21, 2–14 in AAC play to finish in last place. As a No. 11 seed in the AAC women's tournament, they lost in the first round to No. 6 seed Tulane.

== Offseason ==
=== Departures ===
Cincinnati departures
Name	Number	Pos.	Height	Year	Hometown	Reason for departure
Dais'Ja Trotter	0	G	5'9"	Senior	Louisville, KY	Graduate transferred to UIC
Caitlyn Wilson	1	G	5'10"	Senior	Cordova, TN	Graduate transferred to Georgia Tech
Jada Scott	3	G	6'1"	Senior	Townsend, GA	Graduate transferred to Miami (OH)
Lojain Elfatairy	4	G	5'4"	Sophomore	Giza, Egypt	
Jadyn Scott	10	G	6'2"	Senior	Townsend, GA	Graduate transferred to Miami (OH)
Sofia Gritzali	33	G	5'7"	Senior	Thessaloniki, Greece	Graduated

=== Incoming ===
Cincinnati incoming transfers
Name	Num	Pos.	Height	Year	Hometown	Previous school
Nia Clark	0	G	5'9"	GS senior	Indianapolis, IN	Marquette
Aicha Dia	6	F	6'1"	Sophomore	Montreal, QC	Penn State
Destiny Thomas	32	C	6'4"	Sophomore	Jonesboro, AR	Memphis

==== Recruiting ====
There was no recruiting class of 2023.

== Roster ==
2023–24 Cincinnati Bearcats women's basketball team
Players
Coaches

Pos.	#	Name	Height	Year	Previous school	Hometown
G	1	Nia Clark	5 ft 9 in (1.75 m)	GS	Ben Davis; Marquette	Indianapolis, IN
G	3	Reagan Jackson	5 ft 8 in (1.73 m)	Fr	Kennedale	Kennedale, TX
G	5	Braylyn Milton	5 ft 11 in (1.8 m)	Jr	Independence	Charlotte, NC
G	6	Aïcha Dia	6 ft 0 in (1.83 m)	So	Dawson College; Penn State	Montreal, QC
G	7	Abby Holtman	5 ft 10 in (1.78 m)	Fr	Ryle	Florence, KY
F	10	Brianna Byars	5 ft 11 in (1.8 m)	Fr	George Rogers Clark	Paris, KY
G	11	Ta'Ziah Jenks	6 ft 0 in (1.83 m)	RS Jr	Mercy Academy; West Virginia	Louisville, KY
F	14	Ramiyah Byrd	5 ft 11 in (1.8 m)	Fr	Spire Institute and Academy	Colorado Springs, CO
F	20	Jillian Hayes	6 ft 1 in (1.85 m)	Sr	Loveland	Cincinnati, OH
F	22	Malea Williams	6 ft 4 in (1.93 m)	Sr	Scott County; Louisville	Georgetown, KY
G	23	Mya Jackson	5 ft 7 in (1.7 m)	GS	Wilmington; Seton Hall	Wilmington, OH
C	32	Destiny Thomas	6 ft 4 in (1.93 m)	So	Jonesboro; Memphis	Jonesboro, AR
C	33	Delaney Snyder	6 ft 5 in (1.96 m)	Fr	TPLS Christian Academy	Richmond, VA
G	34	A'riel Jackson	5 ft 9 in (1.75 m)	So	Bishop Loughlin Memorial	Brooklyn, NY
F/C	42	Clarissa Craig	6 ft 3 in (1.91 m)	Jr	Roger Bacon	Cincinnati, OH

Head coach

- Katrina Merriweather (Cincinnati)

Assistant coach(es)

- Ashley Barlow (Notre Dame)
- Abby Jump (Wright State)
- Kabrina Merriweather (Florida A&M)

Legend

- (C) Team captain
- (S) Suspended
- (I) Ineligible
- (W) Walk-on
- Injured
- Current redshirt

Roster

== Schedule ==
Date time, TV	Rank^{#}	Opponent^{#}	Result	Record	Site (attendance) city, state
Exhibition
November 1, 2023*; 6:00 p.m.		Ohio Dominican	W 76–38		Fifth Third Arena; Cincinnati, OH
Non-conference regular season
November 6, 2023*; 6:00 p.m., ESPN+		No. 17 Louisville rivalry	L 59–77	0–1	Fifth Third Arena (1,725); Cincinnati, OH
November 15, 2023*; 11:00 a.m., ESPN+		Lindenwood	W 81–62	1–1	Fifth Third Arena (4,673); Cincinnati, OH
November 19, 2023*; 2:00 p.m., ESPN+		at Toledo	W 71–60	2–1	Savage Arena (4,073); Toledo, OH
November 23, 2023*; 1:00 p.m., ESPN+		vs. No. 3 Colorado; Paradise Jam Island Division	L 60–77	2–2	Sports and Fitness Center (624); Saint Thomas, USVI
November 24, 2023*; 3:15 p.m., ESPN+		vs. No. 10 NC State; Paradise Jam Island Division	L 45–79	2–3	Sports and Fitness Center (524); Saint Thomas, USVI
November 25, 2023*; 3:15 p.m., ESPN+		vs. Kentucky; Paradise Jam Island Division	W 65–41	3–3	Sports and Fitness Center (924); Saint Thomas, USVI
December 1, 2023*; 6:00 p.m., ESPN+		Tennessee State	W 76–52	4–3	Fifth Third Arena (1,072); Cincinnati, OH
December 10, 2023*; 2:00 p.m., ESPN+		Xavier rivalry	W 69–47	5–3	Fifth Third Arena (5,013); Cincinnati, OH
December 13, 2023*; 6:00 p.m., ESPN+		Howard	W 87–52	6–3	Fifth Third Arena (573); Cincinnati, OH
December 17, 2023*; 3:00 p.m., ESPN+		at Southern Indiana	W 58–56	7–3	Screaming Eagles Arena (746); Evansville, IN
December 21, 2023*; 2:00 p.m., ESPN+		Siena	W 71–51	8–3	Fifth Third Arena (974); Cincinnati, OH
Big 12 Conference regular season
December 30, 2023; 2:00 p.m., ESPN+		No. 11 Kansas State	L 41–66	8–4 (0–1)	Fifth Third Arena (1,472); Cincinnati, OH
January 3, 2024; 7:00 p.m., BIG12/ESPN+		at No. 24 West Virginia	L 53–68	8–5 (0–2)	WVU Coliseum (1,808); Morgantown, WV
January 6, 2024; 1:00 p.m., ESPN+		at Oklahoma	L 64–77	8–6 (0–3)	Lloyd Noble Center (3,126); Norman, OK
January 10, 2024; 6:00 p.m., ESPN+		UCF	W 64–63	9–6 (1–3)	Fifth Third Arena (587); Cincinnati, OH
January 13, 2024; 6:00 p.m., BIG12/ESPN+		at BYU	L 58–68	9–7 (1–4)	Marriott Center (1,786); Provo, UT
January 20, 2024; 4:00 p.m., ESPN+		West Virginia	L 43–72	9–8 (1–5)	Fifth Third Arena (1,264); Cincinnati, OH
January 24, 2024; 6:00 p.m., ESPN+		Oklahoma State	W 58–56	10–8 (2–5)	Fifth Third Arena (1,392); Cincinnati, OH
January 27, 2024; 3:00 p.m., LHN		at No. 10 Texas	L 50–67	10–9 (2–6)	Moody Center (6,008); Austin, TX
January 30, 2024; 8:00 p.m., BIG12/ESPN+		at Houston	L 46–54	10–10 (2–7)	Fertitta Center (974); Houston, TX
February 3, 2024; 2:00 p.m., ESPN+		Texas Tech	W 74–56	11–10 (3–7)	Fifth Third Arena (2,510); Cincinnati, OH
February 7, 2024; 6:00 p.m., BIG12/ESPN+		at UCF	W 67–61	12–10 (4–7)	Addition Financial Arena (1,108); Orlando, FL
February 10, 2024; 12:00 p.m., ESPN+		BYU	L 57–69	12–11 (4–8)	Fifth Third Arena (1,084); Cincinnati, OH
February 14, 2024; 7:30 p.m., BIG12/ESPN+		at Kansas	L 60–75	12–12 (4–9)	Allen Fieldhouse (2,872); Lawrence, KS
February 17, 2024; 2:00 p.m., ESPN+		TCU	L 72–79	12–13 (4–10)	Fifth Third Arena (1,952); Cincinnati, OH
February 20, 2024; 6:00 p.m., ESPN+		No. 23 Oklahoma	L 87–95	12–14 (4–11)	Fifth Third Arena (1,347); Cincinnati, OH
February 24, 2024; 3:00 p.m., BIG12/ESPN+		at Texas Tech	W 68–56	13–14 (5–11)	United Supermarkets Arena (4,788); Lubbock, TX
February 27, 2024; 6:00 p.m., ESPN+		No. 21 Baylor	L 55–74	13–15 (5–12)	Fifth Third Arena (1,488); Cincinnati, OH
March 2, 2024; 2:00 p.m., BIG12/ESPN+		at Iowa State	L 60–76	13–16 (5–13)	Hilton Coliseum (10,632); Ames, IA
Big 12 Conference Tournament
March 7, 2024; 9:00 p.m., ESPN+	(11)	vs. (14) UCF; First Round	W 67–62	14–16	T-Mobile Center (2,824); Kansas City, MO
March 8, 2024; 9:00 p.m., ESPN+	(11)	vs. (6) West Virginia; Second Round	L 55–70	14–17	T-Mobile Center (4,402); Kansas City, MO
WNIT
March 24, 2024*; 2:00 p.m., ESPN+		Purdue Fort Wayne; Second Round	L 58–84	14–18	Fifth Third Arena (857); Cincinnati, OH
*Non-conference game. ^{#}Rankings from AP Poll. (#) Tournament seedings in parentheses. All times are in Eastern Time.

== See also ==
- 2023–24 Cincinnati Bearcats men's basketball team
