= 2023–24 Iowa State Cyclones women's basketball team =

Intercollegiate basketball season team

2023–24 Iowa State Cyclones women's basketball

NCAA tournament, Second Round
- Conference: Big 12 Conference

Ranking
- AP: No. 25
- Record: 21–12 (12–6 Big 12)
- Head coach: Bill Fennelly (29th season)
- Associate head coach: Jodi Steyer
- Assistant coaches: Latoja Schaben; Billy Fennelly
- Home arena: Hilton Coliseum

2023–24 Big 12 Conference women's basketball standings
	Conf.				Overall
Team	W		L	PCT	W		L	PCT
No. 21 Oklahoma	15	–	3	.833	23	–	10	.697
No. 7 Texas †	14	–	4	.778	33	–	5	.868
No. 19 Kansas State	13	–	5	.722	26	–	8	.765
No. 25 Iowa State	12	–	6	.667	21	–	12	.636
No. 13 Baylor	12	–	6	.667	26	–	8	.765
No. 24 West Virginia	12	–	6	.667	25	–	8	.758
Kansas	11	–	7	.611	20	–	13	.606
Oklahoma State	7	–	11	.389	14	–	16	.467
TCU	6	–	12	.333	21	–	12	.636
BYU	6	–	12	.333	16	–	17	.485
Cincinnati	5	–	13	.278	14	–	18	.438
Texas Tech	5	–	13	.278	17	–	16	.515
Houston	5	–	13	.278	14	–	16	.467
UCF	3	–	15	.167	12	–	17	.414
† 2024 Big 12 tournament winner Rankings from AP poll

The 2023–24 Iowa State Cyclones women's basketball team represented Iowa State University during the 2023–24 NCAA Division I women's basketball season. The Cyclones, were led by twenty-ninth-year head coach Bill Fennelly and played their home games at the Hilton Coliseum as members of the Big 12 Conference.

== Previous season ==
The Cyclones finished the 2022–23 season 22–10, 11–7 in Big 12 play to finish in third place. The Cyclones defeated Baylor, Oklahoma and Texas to win the Big 12 women's tournament, as at result they received an automatic bid to the 2023 NCAA tournament as a 5th seed in the Seattle Region 3 where they were upset by 11th seed Toledo in the first round.

== Offseason ==
=== Departures ===
Iowa State Departures
Name	Number	Pos.	Height	Year	Hometown	Reason for Departure
Denae Fritz	3	G	5'11"	(redshirt) Freshman	Maryville, TN	Transferred to Baylor
Stephanie Soares	10	F/C	6'6"	(redshirt) Senior	São Paulo, Brazil	Graduated/2023 WNBA draft; selected 4th overall by Washington Mystics
Maggie Espenmiller-McGraw	13	G	5'10"	Senior	Indiaola, IA	Graduate transferred to Montana
Izzi Zingaro	15	F	6'4"	(redshirt) Sophomore	Bolton, ON	Left the team for personal reasons
Lexi Donarski	21	G	6'0"	Junior	La Crosse, WI	Transferred to North Carolina
Ashley Joens	24	G	6'1"	GS Senior	Iowa City, IA	Graduated/2023 WNBA draft; selected 19th overall by Dallas Wings
Beatriz Jordão	25	C	6'3"	GS Senior	Pombal, Portugal	Graduated
Morgan Kane	31	F	6'3"	(redshirt) Senior	West Jordan, UT	Graduate transferred to Nova Southeastern
Maggie Vick	32	F	6'2"	Sophomore	Morristown, TN	Transferred to Pepperdine

=== Incoming ===
Iowa State incoming transfers
Name	Num	Pos.	Height	Year	Hometown	Previous School
Isnelle Natabou	1	C	6'5"	Senior	Česká Lípa, Czech Republic	Sacramento State
Alisa Williams	3	F	6'2"	Sophomore	Denton, TX	LSU
Hannah Belanger	13	G	5'8"	GS Senior	Grafton, WI	Truman State

==== Recruiting ====
College recruiting information
Name	Hometown	School	Height	Weight	Commit date
Addyson Brown; W	Derby, KS	Derby Senior High School	6 ft 2 in (1.88 m)	N/A	
Addyson Brown; W	Recruit ratings: ESPN: (95)				
Jalynn Bristow; F	Wichita Falls, TX	Holliday High School	6 ft 2 in (1.88 m)	N/A	
Jalynn Bristow; F	Recruit ratings: ESPN: (94)				
Audi Crooks; P	Algona, IA	Bishop Garrigan High School	6 ft 3 in (1.91 m)	N/A	
Audi Crooks; P	Recruit ratings: ESPN: (93)				
Arianna Jackson; G	Des Moines, IA	Theodore Roosevelt High School	5 ft 9 in (1.75 m)	N/A	
Arianna Jackson; G	Recruit ratings: No ratings found				
Overall recruit ranking:
Note: In many cases, Scout, Rivals, 247Sports, On3, and ESPN may conflict in their listings of height and weight.; In these cases, the average was taken. ESPN grades are on a 100-point scale.; Sources: "2023 Player Commits". ESPN. Archived from the original on February 7, 2023.

==== Recruiting class of 2024 ====
College recruiting information (2024)
Name	Hometown	School	Height	Weight	Commit date
Aili Tanke; G	Johnston, IA	Johnston High School	5 ft 10 in (1.78 m)	N/A	
Aili Tanke; G	Recruit ratings: ESPN: (91)				
Overall recruit ranking:
Note: In many cases, Scout, Rivals, 247Sports, On3, and ESPN may conflict in their listings of height and weight.; In these cases, the average was taken. ESPN grades are on a 100-point scale.; Sources: "2024 Player Commits". ESPN. Archived from the original on December 11, 2023.

== Roster ==
2023–24 Iowa State Cyclones women's basketball team
Players
Coaches

Pos.	#	Name	Height	Year	Previous school	Hometown
C	0	Isnelle Natabou	6 ft 5 in (1.96 m)	Jr	Sacramento State	Česká Lípa, Czech Republic
F	1	Jalynn Bristow	6 ft 2 in (1.88 m)	Fr	Holliday	Holliday, TX
G	2	Arianna Jackson	5 ft 9 in (1.75 m)	Fr	Roosevelt	Des Moines, IA
F	3	Alisa Williams (redshirt)	6 ft 2 in (1.88 m)	So	LSU	Denton, TX
G	4	Shantavia Dawkins	5 ft 7 in (1.7 m)	RS So	Southwest Academy	Brampton, ON
F	5	Nyamer Diew	6 ft 2 in (1.88 m)	Sr	Butler	Marshall, MN
G	11	Emily Ryan	5 ft 11 in (1.8 m)	Sr	Central Plains	Claflin, KS
G	12	Mary Kate King	5 ft 3 in (1.6 m)	Jr	Wahlert Catholic	Dubuque, IA
G	13	Hannah Belanger	5 ft 8 in (1.73 m)	GS	Truman State	Grafton, IA
G	23	Kelsey Joens	5 ft 10 in (1.78 m)	Fr	West Liberty	Iowa City, IA
F	24	Addy Brown	6 ft 2 in (1.88 m)	Fr	Derby	Derby, KS
C	55	Audi Crooks	6 ft 3 in (1.91 m)	Fr	Bishop Garrigan	Algona, IA

Head coach

- Bill Fennelly (William Penn)

Assistant coach(es)

- Jodi Steyer (Colorado State)
- Latoja Schaben (Toledo)
- Billy Fennelly (Iowa State)

Legend

- (C) Team captain
- (S) Suspended
- (I) Ineligible
- (W) Walk-on
- Injured
- Current redshirt

Roster

== Schedule ==
Date time, TV	Rank^{#}	Opponent^{#}	Result	Record	Site (attendance) city, state
Exhibition
November 1, 2023*; 6:30 p.m.		Truman State	W 88–68		Hilton Coliseum (9,711); Ames, IA
Non-conference regular season
November 6, 2023*; 11:00 a.m., BIG12/ESPN+		Butler	W 82–55	1–0	Hilton Coliseum (9,938); Ames, IA
November 12, 2023*; 2:00 p.m., ESPN+		at Drake	L 73–85	1–1	Knapp Center (4,203); Des Moines, IA
November 20, 2023*; 6:30 p.m., BIG12/ESPN+		Southern	W 78–60	2–1	Hilton Coliseum (8,776); Ames, IA
November 24, 2023*; 3:30 p.m., FloSports		vs. Vanderbilt; South Point Shootout	L 53–68	2–2	South Point Arena; Las Vegas, NV
November 25, 2023*; 1:00 p.m., FloSports		vs. Syracuse; South Point Shootout	L 69–81	2–3	South Point Arena; Las Vegas, NV
November 29, 2023*; 7:00 p.m.		at St. Thomas	W 85–44	3–3	Schoenecker Arena (979); Saint Paul, MN
December 3, 2023*; 1:00 p.m., BIG12/ESPN+		UNC Wilmington	W 85–58	4–3	Hilton Coliseum (9,933); Ames, IA
December 6, 2023*; 6:00 p.m., ESPN2		No. 4 Iowa rivalry/Iowa Corn Cy-Hawk Series	L 58–67	4–4	Hilton Coliseum (14,267); Ames, IA
December 10, 2023*; 5:00 p.m., BIG12/ESPN+		North Dakota State	W 89–59	5–4	Hilton Coliseum (9,808); Ames, IA
December 17, 2023*; 12:00 p.m., BIG12/ESPN+		Troy	W 105–68	6–4	Hilton Coliseum (9,089); Ames, IA
December 20, 2023*; 6:30 p.m., BIG12/ESPN+		Northern Iowa	W 87–70	7–4	Hilton Coliseum (9,346); Ames, IA
Big 12 Conference regular season
December 30, 2023; 2:00 p.m., BIG12/ESPN+		at Oklahoma State	W 76–68	8–4 (1–0)	Gallagher-Iba Arena (2,770); Stillwater, OK
January 3, 2024; 6:30 p.m., BIG12/ESPN+		Kansas	W 69–61	9–4 (2–0)	Hilton Coliseum (8,929); Ames, IA
January 6, 2024; 5:00 p.m., BIG12/ESPN+		at BYU	W 80–75	10–4 (3–0)	Marriott Center (1,872); Provo, UT
January 10, 2024; 6:30 p.m., BIG12/ESPN+		No. 24 West Virginia	W 74–64	11–4 (4–0)	Hilton Coliseum (8,798); Ames, IA
January 13, 2024; 12:00 p.m., BIG12/ESPN+		No. 4 Baylor	W 66–63	12–4 (5–0)	Hilton Coliseum (9,420); Ames, IA
January 17, 2024; 6:00 p.m., BIG12/ESPN+	No. 24	at Texas Tech	L 63–71	12–5 (5–1)	United Supermarkets Arena (4,410); Lubbock, TX
January 20, 2024; 1:00 p.m., BIG12/ESPN+	No. 24	TCU	W 2–0 Forfeit	12–5 (6–1)	Hilton Coliseum; Ames, IA
January 24, 2024; 6:30 p.m., BIG12/ESPN+		at Kansas	L 58–60	12–6 (6–2)	Allen Fieldhouse (3,157); Lawrence, KS
January 27, 2024; 1:00 p.m., BIG12/ESPN+		at No. 24 West Virginia	L 78–84	12–7 (6–3)	WVU Coliseum (4,905); Morgantown, WV
January 31, 2024; 6:30 p.m., BIG12/ESPN+		Oklahoma State	W 78–67	13–7 (7–3)	Hilton Coliseum (9,962); Ames, IA
February 3, 2024; 11:00 a.m., BIG12/ESPN+		at UCF	L 66–71	13–8 (7–4)	Addition Financial Arena (1,088); Orlando, FL
February 10, 2024; 6:00 p.m., BIG12/ESPN+		No. 24 Oklahoma	L 72–86	13–9 (7–5)	Hilton Coliseum (10,377); Ames, IA
February 14, 2024; 6:30 p.m., BIG12/ESPN+		No. 7 Kansas State	W 96–93 ^{2OT}	14–9 (8–5)	Hilton Coliseum (9,936); Ames, IA
February 17, 2024; 1:00 p.m., ESPNU		at No. 5 Texas	L 60–81	14–10 (8–6)	Moody Center (7,013); Austin, TX
February 21, 2024; 7:00 p.m., BIG12/ESPN+		at Houston	W 76–64	15–10 (9–6)	Fertitta Center (995); Houston, TX
February 24, 2024; 6:00 p.m., BIG12/ESPN+		BYU	W 74–49	16–10 (10–6)	Hilton Coliseum (10,896); Ames, IA
February 28, 2024; 6:30 p.m., BIG12/ESPN+		at No. 15 Kansas State	W 82–76	17–10 (11–6)	Bramlage Coliseum (5,340); Manhattan, KS
March 2, 2024; 1:00 p.m., BIG12/ESPN+		Cincinnati	W 76–60	18–10 (12–6)	Hilton Coliseum (10,632); Ames, IA
Big 12 Conference Tournament
March 9, 2024; 11:00 a.m., ESPN+	(4)	vs. (5) No. 17 Baylor; Quarterfinals	W 67–62	19–10	T-Mobile Center; Kansas City, MO
March 11, 2024; 1:30 p.m., ESPN2	(4)	vs. (1) No. 17 Oklahoma; Semifinals	W 85–68	20–10	T-Mobile Center; Kansas City, MO
March 12, 2024; 8:00 p.m., ESPN2	(4)	vs. (2) No. 5 Texas; Championship	L 53–70	20–11	T-Mobile Center (5,380); Kansas City, MO
NCAA Tournament
March 22, 2024*; 6:30 p.m., ESPN2	(7 P4)	vs. (10 P4) Maryland; First round	W 93–86	21–11	Maples Pavilion; Stanford, CA
March 24, 2024*; 9:00 p.m., ESPN	(7 P4)	at (2 P4) No. 5 Stanford; Second round	L 81–87 ^{OT}	21–12	Maples Pavilion (5,811); Stanford, CA
*Non-conference game. ^{#}Rankings from AP Poll. (#) Tournament seedings in parentheses. P4=Portland 4. All times are in Central Time.

== See also ==
- 2023–24 Iowa State Cyclones men's basketball team
