= 2023–24 Texas Longhorns women's basketball team =

Intercollegiate basketball season

2023–24 Texas Longhorns women's basketball

Paradise Jam Reef champions Big 12 tournament champions

NCAA tournament, Elite Eight
- Conference: Big 12 Conference

Ranking
- Coaches: No. 5
- AP: No. 7
- Record: 33–5 (14–4 Big 12)
- Head coach: Vic Schaefer (4th season)
- Associate head coach: Elena Lovato (2nd season)
- Assistant coaches: Lindsay Wisdom-Hylton (2nd season); Blair Schaefer (4th season)
- Home arena: Moody Center

2023–24 Big 12 Conference women's basketball standings
	Conf.				Overall
Team	W		L	PCT	W		L	PCT
No. 21 Oklahoma	15	–	3	.833	23	–	10	.697
No. 7 Texas †	14	–	4	.778	33	–	5	.868
No. 19 Kansas State	13	–	5	.722	26	–	8	.765
No. 25 Iowa State	12	–	6	.667	21	–	12	.636
No. 13 Baylor	12	–	6	.667	26	–	8	.765
No. 24 West Virginia	12	–	6	.667	25	–	8	.758
Kansas	11	–	7	.611	20	–	13	.606
Oklahoma State	7	–	11	.389	14	–	16	.467
TCU	6	–	12	.333	21	–	12	.636
BYU	6	–	12	.333	16	–	17	.485
Cincinnati	5	–	13	.278	14	–	18	.438
Texas Tech	5	–	13	.278	17	–	16	.515
Houston	5	–	13	.278	14	–	16	.467
UCF	3	–	15	.167	12	–	17	.414
† 2024 Big 12 tournament winner Rankings from AP poll

The 2023–24 Texas Longhorns women's basketball team represented the University of Texas at Austin in the 2023–24 NCAA Division I women's basketball season. The team was coached by Vic Schaefer entering his fourth season at Texas. The Longhorns were members of the Big 12 Conference and played their home games at the new Moody Center.

This was the Longhorns' final season in the Big 12. After having announced in 2021 that it would leave for the Southeastern Conference (SEC) no later than 2025, Texas reached a buyout agreement with the Big 12 that will allow it to join the SEC in July 2024.

== Previous season ==
=== Regular season ===
The Longhorns finished the 2022–23 season 26–10, 14–4 in Big 12 play. Texas also won the Big 12 regular season championship and went to the round of 32 at the NCAA Tournament.

== Offseason ==
=== Returning players ===
Name	Number	Pos.	Height	Year	Hometown
Rori Harmon	3	G	5’6”	Sophomore	Houston, TX
DeYona Gaston	5	F	6'2"	Junior	Pearland, TX
Shay Holle	10	G	6’0”	Junior	Austin, TX
Aaliyah Moore	23	F	6’1”	Sophomore	Moore, OK

=== Departures ===
Name	Number	Pos.	Height	Year	Hometown	Reason for departure
Anissa Gutierrez	4	G	5'7"	Senior	Mansfield, TX	Graduated
Sonya Morris	11	G	5'10"	Graduate Student	St. Louis, MO	Graduated

==== Outgoing transfers ====
Name	Pos.	Height	Year	Hometown	New Team	Source
Femme Masudi	C	6'5"	Senior	Goma, DR Congo	New Mexico State	
Kyndall Hunter	G	5'7"	Redshirt Sophomore	Houston, TX	Texas A&M	

=== Acquisitions ===
==== Incoming transfers ====
Name	Pos.	Height	Year	Hometown	Previous team	Source
Tionna Herron	C	6'4”	Freshman	DeSoto, TX	Kentucky	

==== 2023 recruiting class ====
College recruiting information (2023)
Name	Hometown	School	Height	Weight	Commit date
Madison Booker; W	Ridgeland, MS	Germantown High School	6 ft 1 in (1.85 m)	N/A	Sep 28, 2022
Madison Booker; W	Recruit ratings: ESPN: (96)				
Gisella Maul; G	Cedar Park, TX	Cedar Park High School	5 ft 11 in (1.80 m)	N/A	Apr 25, 2022
Gisella Maul; G	Recruit ratings: ESPN: (94)				
Overall recruiting rankings:
Note: In many cases, Scout, Rivals, 247Sports, and ESPN may conflict in their listings of height and weight.; In these cases, the average was taken. ESPN grades are on a 100-point scale.; Sources: "2023 Player Commits". ESPN.com.

== Preseason ==
=== Big 12 Media Poll ===
Big 12 media poll
Predicted finish	Team	Votes (1st place)
1	Texas	168 (12)
2	Baylor	148 (2)
3	Kansas	138
4	Kansas State	133
5	Oklahoma	121
6	Iowa State	107
7	Oklahoma State	99
8	West Virginia	80
9	TCU	77
10	Texas Tech	63
11	BYU	56
12	Houston	45
13	Cincinnati	22
14	UCF	18

=== Award watch lists ===
Listed in the order that they were released

Award	Player	Position	Year	Source
Wooden Award	Rori Harmon	PG	Junior	
Naismith Women’s Player of the Year	Rori Harmon	PG	Junior	
Wade Trophy	Rori Harmon	PG	Junior	
Nancy Lieberman Award	Rori Harmon	PG	Junior	
Ann Meyers Drysdale Award	Shaylee Gonzales	G	Graduate Student	
Katrina McClain Award	DeYona Gaston	F	Senior	
Katrina McClain Award	Aaliyah Moore	F	Junior	
Lisa Leslie Award	Taylor Jones	F	Graduate Student	

=== Preseason All-Big 12 teams ===
Position	Player	Class
First Team
G	Rori Harmon (Note: Unanimous pick)	Junior
F	DeYona Gaston	Senior
Honorable Mention
G	Shaylee Gonzales	Graduate Student
F	Aaliyah Moore	Junior

== Roster ==
2023–24 Texas Longhorns women's basketball team
Players
Coaches

Pos.	#	Name	Height	Year	Previous school	Hometown
G	2	Shaylee Gonzales	5 ft 10 in (1.78 m)	GS	BYU	Gilbert, AZ
PG	3	Rori Harmon	5 ft 6 in (1.68 m)	Jr	Cypress Creek	Houston, TX
F	5	DeYona Gaston	6 ft 2 in (1.88 m)	Sr	Pearland	Pearland, TX
C	8	Tionna Herron	6 ft 4 in (1.93 m)	Fr	Kentucky	DeSoto, TX
G	10	Shay Holle	6 ft 0 in (1.83 m)	Sr	Westlake	Austin, TX
G	13	Jordana Codio	6 ft 1 in (1.85 m)	So	Montverde Academy	Jupiter, FL
F	14	Amina Muhammad	6 ft 4 in (1.93 m)	So	DeSoto High School (Texas)	DeSoto, TX
C	20	Khadija Faye	6 ft 4 in (1.93 m)	Sr	Texas Tech	Dakar, Senegal
G	21	Gisella Maul	5 ft 11 in (1.8 m)	Fr	Cedar Park	Cedar Park, TX
F	23	Aaliyah Moore	6 ft 1 in (1.85 m)	Jr	Moore	Moore, OK
G	25	Sarah Graves	5 ft 9 in (1.75 m)	So	Keller	Keller, TX
G	32	Ndjakalenga Mwenentanda	6 ft 2 in (1.88 m)	So	Washington	Sioux Falls, SD
F	35	Madison Booker	6 ft 1 in (1.85 m)	Fr	Germantown	Ridgeland, MS
F	44	Taylor Jones	6 ft 4 in (1.93 m)	Sr	Oregon State	Forney, TX
C	50	Abbie Boutilier	6 ft 9 in (2.06 m)	Fr	Flower Mound	Flower Mound, TX

Head coach

- Vic Schaefer (Texas A&M)

Assistant coach(es)

- Elena Lovato (Pittsburg State)
- Lindsay Wisdom-Hylton (Purdue)
- Blair Schaefer (Mississippi State)

Legend

- (C) Team captain
- (S) Suspended
- (I) Ineligible
- (W) Walk-on
- Injured
- Current redshirt

Roster

=== Support staff ===
2023-24 Texas Longhorns support staff
- Sydney Carter – Director of player development
- Zack Zillner – Sports Performance Coach
- Kristin Grant – Director of Video and Recruiting Digital Services
- Christy Smith – Director of operations
- Dennis Colwell – Administrative Associate
- Ryan Yablonsky – Graduate assistant
- Brennan Dumas – Graduate assistant
- Mason Wright – Graduate assistant

=== Roster outlook ===
Senior	Junior	Sophomore	Freshman
Shaylee Gonzales — G	DeYona Gaston — F Khadija Faye — F Shay Holle — G Taylor Jones — F	Aaliyah Moore — F Rori Harmon — G	Amina Muhammad — F Jordana Codio — G Ndjakalenga Mwenentanda — F

== Schedule and results ==
Date time, TV	Rank^{#}	Opponent^{#}	Result	Record	High points	High rebounds	High assists	Site (attendance) city, state
Exhibition
November 2, 2023*; 7:00 p.m., LHN	No. 13	Midwestern State	W 124–52	0–0	22 – Jones	11 – Faye	7 – Booker	Moody Center; Austin, TX
Non-Conference Regular Season
November 8, 2023*; 7:00 p.m., LHN	No. 13	Southern	W 80–35	1–0	19 – Jones	14 – Muhammad	9 – Harmon	Moody Center (5,106); Austin, TX
November 12, 2023*; 2:00 p.m., LHN	No. 13	Liberty	W 75–57	2–0	14 – Tied	7 – Muhammad	5 – Tied	Moody Center (5,189); Austin, TX
November 14, 2023*; 7:00 p.m., LHN	No. 11	UT Arlington	W 110–64	3–0	21 – Jones	7 – Holle	7 – Harmon	Moody Center (5,016); Austin, TX
November 19, 2023*; 2:00 p.m., LHN	No. 11	Louisiana Tech	W 96–44	4–0	25 – Jones	8 – Jones	11 – Harmon	Moody Center (5,532); Austin, TX
November 23, 2023*; 7:00 p.m., ESPN+	No. 12	vs. Arizona State; Paradise Jam Reef Division	W 84–42	5–0	15 – Faye	7 – Tied	7 – Harmon	Sports and Fitness Center (1,224); Saint Thomas, USVI
November 24, 2023*; 7:00 p.m., ESPN+	No. 12	vs. High Point; Paradise Jam Reef Division	W 101–39	6–0	15 – Gonzales	9 – Mwenentanda	6 – Harmon	Sports and Fitness Center (1,824); Saint Thomas, USVI
November 25, 2023*; 7:00 p.m., ESPN+	No. 12	vs. South Florida; Paradise Jam Reef Division	W 76–44	7–0	15 – Tied	8 – Harmon	3 – Mwenentanda	Sports and Fitness Center (2,424); Saint Thomas, USVI
November 29, 2023*; 11:00 a.m., LHN	No. 10	Oral Roberts	W 112–74	8–0	27 – Jones	15 – Jones	13 – Harmon	Moody Center (7,211); Austin, TX
December 3, 2023*; 2:00 p.m., ABC	No. 10	No. 11 UConn; Jimmy V Classic	W 80–68	9–0	27 – Harmon	8 – Muhammad	13 – Harmon	Moody Center (10,763); Austin, TX
December 6, 2023*; 7:00 p.m., LHN	No. 5	Long Beach State	W 106–62	10–0	21 – Jones	10 – Jones	7 – Booker	Moody Center (5,087); Austin, TX
December 13, 2023*; 8:00 p.m., P12N	No. 5	at Arizona	W 88–75	11–0	19 – Harmon	9 – Harmon	11 – Harmon	McKale Center (7,261); Tucson, AZ
December 20, 2023*; 6:30 p.m., ESPN+	No. 5	at UT Rio Grande Valley	W 104–51	12–0	12 – Tied	9 – Moore	8 – Harmon	Bert Ogden Arena (6,591); Edinburg, TX
December 27, 2023*; 7:00 p.m., LHN	No. 5	Jackson State	W 97–52	13–0	21 – Gonzales	8 – Gaston	9 – Booker	Moody Center (5,988); Austin, TX
Big 12 Regular Season
December 30, 2023; 1:00 p.m., FOX	No. 5	No. 10 Baylor	L 79–85	13–1 (0–1)	25 – Booker	7 – Booker	8 – Booker	Moody Center (8,207); Austin, TX
January 3, 2024; 6:00 p.m., ESPN+	No. 10	at Texas Tech	W 74–47	14–1 (1–1)	18 – Tied	12 – Moore	6 – Booker	United Supermarkets Arena (8,207); Lubbock, TX
January 6, 2024; 1:00 p.m., ESPN+	No. 10	at No. 24 West Virginia	W 70–49	15–1 (2–1)	15 – Tied	12 – Booker	7 – Booker	WVU Coliseum (2,601); Morgantown, WV
January 10, 2024; 7:00 p.m., LHN	No. 10	TCU	W 72–60	16–1 (3–1)	21 – Booker	7 – Tied	6 – Booker	Moody Center (6,009); Austin, TX
January 13, 2024; 1:00 p.m., ESPNU	No. 10	at No. 12 Kansas State	L 58–61	16–2 (3–2)	23 – Booker	8 – Gonzales	4 – Booker	Bramlage Coliseum (7,062); Manhattan, KS
January 16, 2024; 7:00 p.m., LHN	No. 11	Kansas	W 91–56	17–2 (4–2)	17 – Moore	8 – Faye	6 – Booker	Moody Center (4,837); Austin, TX
January 20, 2024; 2:00 p.m., ESPN+	No. 11	at Oklahoma State	W 76–66	18–2 (5–2)	19 – Booker	14 – Jones	5 – Booker	Gallagher-Iba Arena (3,405); Stillwater, OK
January 24, 2024; 6:00 p.m., ESPNU	No. 10	Oklahoma	L 87–91	18–3 (5–3)	19 – Vann	12 – Vann	10 – Tot	Moody Center (5,478); Austin, TX
January 27, 2024; 2:00 p.m., LHN	No. 10	Cincinnati	W 67–50	19–3 (6–3)	16 – Moore	9 – Jones	3 – Tied	Moody Center (6,008); Austin, TX
February 1, 2024; 7:30 p.m., ESPN	No. 12	at No. 13 Baylor	W 67–55	20–3 (7–3)	22 – Booker	9 – Jones	3 – Tied	Foster Pavilion (6,015); Waco, TX
February 4, 2024; 1:00 p.m., FS1	No. 12	No. 2 Kansas State	W 61–54	21–3 (8–3)	20 – Booker	15 – Moore	6 – Tied	Moody Center (8,325); Austin, TX
February 10, 2024; 4:00 p.m., ESPN+	No. 7	at TCU	W 65–43	22–3 (9–3)	14 – Holle	6 – Tied	8 – Gonzales	Schollmaier Arena (3,685); Fort Worth, TX
February 14, 2024; 7:00 p.m., ESPN+	No. 5	at Houston	W 82–66	23–3 (10–3)	23 – Booker	8 – Tied	4 – Tied	Fertitta Center (1,610); Houston, TX
February 17, 2024; 1:00 p.m., ESPNU	No. 5	Iowa State	W 81–60	24–3 (11–3)	18 – Tied	13 – Jones	10 – Booker	Moody Center (7,013); Austin, TX
February 21, 2024; 7:00 p.m., LHN	No. 5	Texas Tech	W 77–72	25–3 (12–3)	19 – Jones	15 – Muhammad	6 – Gonzales	Moody Center (5,892); Austin, TX
February 24, 2024; 11:00 a.m., ESPN+	No. 5	at UCF	W 87–56	26–3 (13–3)	22 – Booker	7 – Jones	6 – Gonzales	Addition Financial Arena (1,621); Orlando, FL
February 28, 2024; 6:00 p.m., ESPN+	No. 3	at No. 20 Oklahoma	L 70–71	26–4 (13–4)	26 – Booker	8 – Booker	7 – Booker	Lloyd Noble Center (6,378); Norman, OK
March 2, 2024; 7:00 p.m., LHN	No. 3	BYU	W 71–46	27–4 (14–4)	20 – Booker	8 – Moore	5 – Tied	Moody Center (10,364); Austin, TX
Big 12 Tournament
March 9, 2024; 5:30 p.m., ESPN+	(2) No. 6	vs. (7) Kansas; Quarterfinals	W 76–60	28–4	21 – Booker	11 – Moore	7 – Booker	T-Mobile Center; Kansas City, MO
March 11, 2024; 4:00 p.m., ESPN2	(2) No. 5	vs. (3) No. 16 Kansas State; Semifinals	W 71–64	29–4	17 – Booker	8 – Moore	3 – Booker	T-Mobile Center (5,219); Kansas City, MO
March 12, 2024; 8:00 p.m., ESPN2	(2) No. 5	vs. (4) Iowa State; Championship	W 70–53	30–4	26 – Booker	6 – Tied	5 – Tied	T-Mobile Center (5,380); Kansas City, MO
NCAA Tournament
March 22, 2024*; 2:00 p.m., ESPNU	(1 P4) No. 4	(16 P4) Drexel; First Round	W 82–42	31–4	21 – Gonzales	10 – Gaston	14 – Booker	Moody Center (7,487); Austin, TX
March 24, 2024*; 5:00 p.m., ESPN	(1 P4) No. 4	(8 P4) Alabama; Second Round	W 65–54	32–4	21 – Tied	10 – Moore	2 – Tied	Moody Center (9,753); Austin, TX
March 29, 2024*; 9:00 p.m., ESPN	(1 P4) No. 4	vs. (4 P4) No. 16 Gonzaga; Sweet Sixteen	W 69–47	33–4	16 – Moore	10 – Moore	6 – Moore	Moda Center (10,104); Portland, OR
March 31, 2024*; 2:00 p.m., ABC	(1 P4) No. 4	vs. (3 P4) No. 11 NC State; Elite Eight	L 66–76	33–5	17 – Booker	9 – Moore	5 – Booker	Moda Center; Portland, OR
*Non-conference game. ^{#}Rankings from AP Poll. (#) Tournament seedings in parentheses. All times are in Central Time.

== Awards and honors ==
National Honors
Honors	Player	Position	Date Awarded	Ref.
Cheryl Miller Award	Madison Booker	F	April 5, 2024	

Conference Honors
Honors	Player	Position	Date Awarded	Ref.
Big 12 Player of the Year	Madison Booker	F	March 5, 2024	
Big 12 Freshman of the Year	Madison Booker	F	March 5, 2024	
Big 12 6th Player of the Year	DeYona Gaston	F		

Weekly honors
Honors	Player	Position	Date Awarded	Ref.
Big 12 Player of the Week	Rori Harmon	G	December 4, 2023	
Big 12 Freshman of the Week	Madison Booker	F	December 4, 2023	

== Rankings ==
Ranking movements Legend: ██ Increase in ranking ██ Decrease in ranking
	Week																				
Poll	Pre	1	2	3	4	5	6	7	8	9	10	11	12	13	14	15	16	17	18	19	Final
AP	13	11	12	10	5	5	5	5	10	10	11	10	12	7	5	5	3	6	5	4	7
Coaches	14	12	11	11	9	7	7	7	10	10	11	11	14	8	5	5	3	6	4	4	5

== See also ==
- 2023–24 Texas Longhorns men's basketball team
