= 2023–24 Texas Tech Lady Raiders basketball team =

Intercollegiate basketball season team

2023–24 Texas Tech Lady Raiders basketball
- Conference: Big 12 Conference
- Record: 17–16 (5–13 Big 12)
- Head coach: Krista Gerlich (4th season)
- Assistant coaches: Ashley Odom; Plenette Pierson; Erik DeRoo; Jordan Vessels; Mitch Vanya
- Home arena: United Supermarkets Arena

2023–24 Big 12 Conference women's basketball standings
	Conf.				Overall
Team	W		L	PCT	W		L	PCT
No. 21 Oklahoma	15	–	3	.833	23	–	10	.697
No. 7 Texas †	14	–	4	.778	33	–	5	.868
No. 19 Kansas State	13	–	5	.722	26	–	8	.765
No. 25 Iowa State	12	–	6	.667	21	–	12	.636
No. 13 Baylor	12	–	6	.667	26	–	8	.765
No. 24 West Virginia	12	–	6	.667	25	–	8	.758
Kansas	11	–	7	.611	20	–	13	.606
Oklahoma State	7	–	11	.389	14	–	16	.467
TCU	6	–	12	.333	21	–	12	.636
BYU	6	–	12	.333	16	–	17	.485
Cincinnati	5	–	13	.278	14	–	18	.438
Texas Tech	5	–	13	.278	17	–	16	.515
Houston	5	–	13	.278	14	–	16	.467
UCF	3	–	15	.167	12	–	17	.414
† 2024 Big 12 tournament winner Rankings from AP poll

The 2023–24 Texas Tech Lady Raiders basketball team represented Texas Tech University during the 2023–24 NCAA Division I women's basketball season. The Lady Raiders, were led by fourth-year head coach Krista Gerlich and played their home games at the United Supermarkets Arena as members of the Big 12 Conference.

== Previous season ==
The Lady Raiders finished the season 20–15, 6–12 in Big 12 play to finish in eighth place. They lost to Kansas State in the Big 12 Tournament. They were invited to the WNIT where they defeated UTEP in the first round, SMU in the second round before losing to Arkansas in the super 16.

== Offseason ==
=== Departures ===
Texas Tech Departures
Name	Number	Pos.	Height	Year	Hometown	Reason for Departure
Ella Tofaeono	1	C	6'3"	Junior	Sydney, Australia	Signed to play professionally in Australia with Townsville Fire
Bryn Gerlich	10	F	6'0"	Senior	Colleyville, TX	Graduated
Lana Wenger	14	F	6'4"	Sophomore	Hersburg, Switzerland	Transferred to Portland State
Bre'Amber Scott	23	G	5'11"	Senior	Little Rock, AR	Graduated
Tatum Veitenheimer	32	G	5'8"	Senior	Windthorst, TX	Graduated
Katie Ferrell	41	G/F	6'1"	Senior	Plano, TX	Graduated

=== Incoming ===
Texas Tech incoming transfers
Name	Num	Pos.	Height	Year	Hometown	Previous School
Jazion Jackson	1	G	5'9"	Senior	Dallas, TX	UTEP
Jordyn Merritt	12	F	6'3"	Senior	Plano, TX	Florida
Elina Arike	13	F	6'2"	Senior	Helsinki, Finland	UTEP
Jada Wynn	24	G	6'1"	Sophomore	Yorba Linda, CA	Colorado

==== Recruiting ====
College recruiting
Name	Hometown	School	Height	Weight	Commit date
Loghan Johnson; G	Houston, TX	Houston Chrisitan High School	5 ft 8 in (1.73 m)	N/A	
Loghan Johnson; G	Recruit ratings: ESPN: (92)				
Overall recruit ranking:
Note: In many cases, Scout, Rivals, 247Sports, On3, and ESPN may conflict in their listings of height and weight.; In these cases, the average was taken. ESPN grades are on a 100-point scale.; Sources: "2023 Player Commits". ESPN. Archived from the original on December 15, 2023.

==== Recruiting class of 2024 ====
College recruiting (2024)
Name	Hometown	School	Height	Weight	Commit date
Kalysta Martin; G	San Antonio, TX	Providence Catholic School	6 ft 1 in (1.85 m)	N/A	
Kalysta Martin; G	Recruit ratings: ESPN: (93)				
Overall recruit ranking:
Note: In many cases, Scout, Rivals, 247Sports, On3, and ESPN may conflict in their listings of height and weight.; In these cases, the average was taken. ESPN grades are on a 100-point scale.; Sources: "2024 Player Commits". ESPN. Archived from the original on December 15, 2023.

== Roster ==
2023–24 Texas Tech Lady Raiders women's basketball team
Players
Coaches

Pos.	#	Name	Height	Year	Previous school	Hometown
G	1	Jazion Jackson	5 ft 9 in (1.75 m)	Sr	Skyline; UTEP	Dallas, TX
G/F	2	Kilah Freelon	6 ft 1 in (1.85 m)	So	Mullen	Denver, CO
G	3	Jasmine Shavers	5 ft 8 in (1.73 m)	RS So	Dr. John Horn; Mississippi State	Mesquite, TX
F/C	4	JoJo Nworie	6 ft 5 in (1.96 m)	RS So	Southern Idaho	Lagos, Nigeria
G	5	Rhyle McKinney	5 ft 9 in (1.75 m)	Jr	Argyle; SMU	Argyle, TX
C	10	Achol Magot	6 ft 7 in (2.01 m)	Fr	Southern Arizona Volunteers Prep	Tucson, AZ
G	11	Saga Ukkonen	5 ft 9 in (1.75 m)	Jr	Mäkelänrinne	Helsinki, Finland
G/F	12	Jordyn Merritt	6 ft 3 in (1.91 m)	Sr	Plano Sr. Florida	Plano, TX
F	13	Elina Arike	6 ft 2 in (1.88 m)	Sr	Mäkelänrinne; UTEP	Helsinki, Finland
G	20	Bailey Maupin	5 ft 10 in (1.78 m)	So	Gruver	Gruver, TX
G	23	Loghan Johnson	5 ft 10 in (1.78 m)	Fr	Houston Christian	Houston, TX
G	24	Jada Wynn	6 ft 1 in (1.85 m)	So	Troy; Colorado	Yorba Linda, CA
G	25	Ashley Chevalier	5 ft 7 in (1.7 m)	Jr	Sierra Canyon; Texas	Chatsworth, CA
G	30	Kelly Mora	6 ft 1 in (1.85 m)	Fr	Monterey	Lubbock, TX
C	42	Jazmaine Lewis	6 ft 4 in (1.93 m)	Sr	Center; Houston	Kansas City, MO

Head coach

- Krista Gerlich (Texas Tech)

Assistant coach(es)

- Ashley Odom (Lamar)
- Plenette Pierson (Texas Tech)
- Erik Deroo (Fresno State)
- Jordan Vessels (West Texas A&M)
- Mitch Vanya (Texas A&M)

Legend

- (C) Team captain
- (S) Suspended
- (I) Ineligible
- (W) Walk-on
- Injured
- Current redshirt

Roster

== Schedule ==
Date time, TV	Rank^{#}	Opponent^{#}	Result	Record	Site (attendance) city, state
Exhibition
October 28, 2023*; 12:00 p.m.		Northern Arizona; Maui Relief Game	L 58–63		United Supermarkets Arena (600); Lubbock, TX
Non-conference regular season
November 7, 2023*; 6:00 p.m., BIG12/ESPN+		UT Rio Grande Valley	W 95–53	1–0	United Supermarkets Arena (4,140); Lubbock, TX
November 10, 2023*; 7:00 p.m., BIG12/ESPN+		Tarleton State	W 70–63	2–0	United Supermarkets Arena (4,514); Lubbock, TX
November 13, 2023*; 6:00 p.m., BIG12/ESPN+		Lamar	W 61–44	3–0	United Supermarkets Arena (3,678); Lubbock, TX
November 17, 2023*; 6:00 p.m., BIG12/ESPN+		Texas A&M–Commerce	W 91–45	4–0	United Supermarkets Arena (4,802); Lubbock, TX
November 20, 2023*; 6:00 p.m., BIG12/ESPN+		UTSA	W 63–58	5–0	United Supermarkets Arena (4,155); Lubbock, TX
November 24, 2023*; 8:30 p.m., FloSports		vs. Rutgers; Las Vegas Thanksgiving Classic	W 79–72	6–0	South Point Arena; Las Vegas, NV
November 25, 2023*; 6:00 p.m., FloSports		vs. Santa Clara; Las Vegas Thanksgiving Classic	W 61–56	7–0	South Point Arena; Las Vegas, NV
November 29, 2023*; 6:00 p.m., BIG12/ESPN+		UC Irvine	W 60–54	8–0	United Supermarkets Arena (4,258); Lubbock, TX
December 1, 2023*; 6:00 p.m., BIG12/ESPN+		Houston Christian	W 79–34	9–0	United Supermarkets Arena (4,516); Lubbock, TX
December 5, 2023*; 6:00 p.m., BIG12/ESPN+		Sam Houston	W 93–60	10–0	United Supermarkets Arena (4,089); Lubbock, TX
December 13, 2023*; 11:30 a.m., BIG12/ESPN+		Incarnate Word	W 76–35	11–0	United Supermarkets Arena (13,743); Lubbock, TX
December 19, 2023*; 9:00 p.m., YouTube		vs. Tulsa; Maui Classic	L 58–66	11–1	Seabury Hall; Makawao, HI
December 20, 2023*; 11:30 p.m., YouTube		vs. Oregon State; Maui Classic	L 65–77	11–2	Seabury Hall (1,100); Makawao, HI
Big 12 Conference regular season
December 30, 2023; 1:00 p.m., BIG12/ESPN+		at Houston	W 79–71	12–2 (1–0)	Fertitta Center (1,975); Houston, TX
January 3, 2024; 6:00 p.m., BIG12/ESPN+		No. 10 Texas	L 47–74	12–3 (1–1)	United Supermarkets Arena (8,207); Lubbock, TX
January 6, 2024; 2:00 p.m., BIG12/ESPN+		Kansas	W 73–64	13–3 (2–1)	United Supermarkets Arena (5,747); Lubbock, TX
January 10, 2024; 6:30 p.m., BIG12/ESPN+		at Oklahoma State	L 58–71	13–4 (2–2)	Gallagher-Iba Arena (1,947); Stillwater, OK
January 13, 2024; 2:00 p.m., ESPN+		at Oklahoma	L 55–73	13–5 (2–3)	Lloyd Noble Center (5,223); Norman, OK
January 17, 2024; 6:00 p.m., BIG12/ESPN+		No. 24 Iowa State	W 71–63	14–5 (3–3)	United Supermarkets Arena (4,410); Lubbock, TX
January 20, 2024; 5:00 p.m., BIG12/ESPN+		at BYU	L 46–60	14–6 (3–4)	Marriott Center (1,873); Provo, UT
January 24, 2024; 6:00 p.m., BIG12/ESPN+		Houston	W 66–48	15–6 (4–4)	United Supermarkets Arena (4,775); Lubbock, TX
January 27, 2024; 2:00 p.m., BIG12/ESPN+		TCU	W 71–65	16–6 (5–4)	United Supermarkets Arena (7,530); Lubbock, TX
February 3, 2024; 1:00 p.m., BIG12/ESPN+		at Cincinnati	L 56–74	16–7 (5–5)	Fifth Third Arena (2,510); Cincinnati, OH
February 6, 2024; 6:00 p.m., BIG12/ESPN+		at No. 22 West Virginia	L 59–82	16–8 (5–6)	WVU Coliseum (2,428); Morgantown, WV
February 10, 2024; 7:00 p.m., BIG12/ESPN+		UCF	L 64–69	16–9 (5–7)	United Supermarkets Arena (4,511); Lubbock, TX
February 14, 2024; 6:00 p.m., BIG12/ESPN+		Oklahoma State	L 50–60	16–10 (5–8)	United Supermarkets Arena (5,063); Lubbock, TX
February 18, 2024; 3:00 p.m., ESPN2		at No. 21 Baylor	L 32–61	16–11 (5–9)	Foster Pavilion (7,093); Waco, TX
February 21, 2024; 7:00 p.m., LHN		at No. 5 Texas	L 72–77	16–12 (5–10)	Moody Center (5,892); Austin, TX
February 24, 2024; 2:00 p.m., BIG12/ESPN+		Cincinnati	L 56–68	16–13 (5–11)	United Supermarkets Arena (4,788); Lubbock, TX
February 28, 2024; 6:30 p.m., BIG12/ESPN+		at TCU	L 52–73	16–14 (5–12)	Schollmaier Arena (2,237); Fort Worth, TX
March 2, 2024; 2:00 p.m., BIG12/ESPN+		No. 15 Kansas State	L 49–73	16–15 (5–13)	United Supermarkets Arena (4,852); Lubbock, TX
Big 12 Conference Tournament
March 7, 2024; 5:30 p.m., ESPN+	(12)	vs. (13) Houston; First Round	W 74–60	17–15	T-Mobile Center; Kansas City, MO
March 8, 2024; 11:00 a.m., ESPN+	(12)	vs. (5) No. 17 Baylor; Second Round	L 60–71	17–16	T-Mobile Center; Kansas City, MO
*Non-conference game. ^{#}Rankings from AP Poll. (#) Tournament seedings in parentheses. All times are in Central Time.

== See also ==
- 2023–24 Texas Tech Red Raiders basketball team
