= 2023–24 West Virginia Mountaineers women's basketball team =

Intercollegiate basketball season team

2023–24 West Virginia Mountaineers women's basketball

NCAA tournament, Second Round
- Conference: Big 12 Conference

Ranking
- Coaches: No. 25
- AP: No. 24
- Record: 25–8 (12–6 Big 12)
- Head coach: Mark Kellogg (1st season)
- Associate head coach: JC Carter
- Assistant coaches: Jessica Grayson; Erin Grant
- Home arena: WVU Coliseum

2023–24 Big 12 Conference women's basketball standings
	Conf.				Overall
Team	W		L	PCT	W		L	PCT
No. 21 Oklahoma	15	–	3	.833	23	–	10	.697
No. 7 Texas †	14	–	4	.778	33	–	5	.868
No. 19 Kansas State	13	–	5	.722	26	–	8	.765
No. 25 Iowa State	12	–	6	.667	21	–	12	.636
No. 13 Baylor	12	–	6	.667	26	–	8	.765
No. 24 West Virginia	12	–	6	.667	25	–	8	.758
Kansas	11	–	7	.611	20	–	13	.606
Oklahoma State	7	–	11	.389	14	–	16	.467
TCU	6	–	12	.333	21	–	12	.636
BYU	6	–	12	.333	16	–	17	.485
Cincinnati	5	–	13	.278	14	–	18	.438
Texas Tech	5	–	13	.278	17	–	16	.515
Houston	5	–	13	.278	14	–	16	.467
UCF	3	–	15	.167	12	–	17	.414
† 2024 Big 12 tournament winner Rankings from AP poll

The 2023–24 West Virginia Mountaineers women's basketball team represented West Virginia University during the 2023–24 NCAA Division I women's basketball season. The Mountaineers were led by first-year head coach Mark Kellogg and played their home games at the WVU Coliseum as members of the Big 12 Conference.

== Previous season ==
The Mountaineers finished the 2022–23 season 19–12, 10–8 in Big 12 play to finish in a three-way tie for fourth place. In the Big 12 Tournament as a No. 5 seed, they lost to Oklahoma State in the quarterfinals. They received an at-large bid to the NCAA tournament as a No. 10 seed in the Greenville region 1, where they lost in the first round to Arizona.

== Offseason ==
On March 18, 2023, head coach Dawn Plitzuweit left West Virginia to accept a head coaching job at Minnesota. On April 3, 2023, former Stephen F. Austin head coach Mark Kellogg was named their next head coach.

=== Departures ===
West Virginia departures
Name	Number	Pos.	Height	Year	Hometown	Reason for departure
Wynter Rogers	2	G	5'11"	(redshirt) Freshman	Little Rock, AR	Transferred to Arkansas State
Sarah Bates	3	G	5'8"	GS senior	Fresno, CA	Graduated
Danni Nichols	4	G	5'10"	GS senior	Columbia, MO	Graduated
Imarianah Russell	5	G	5'10"	Freshman	Columbus, OH	
Isis Beh	23	F	6'3"	(redshirt) Sophomore	Murray, UT	Transferred to Arizona
Savannah Samuel	24	G	6'1"	Junior	Woodstock, GA	Transferred to Boston College
Madisen Smith	30	G	5'5"	GS senior	Greenville, SC	Graduated

=== Incoming ===
West Virginia incoming transfers
Name	Num	Pos.	Height	Year	Hometown	Previous School
Ainhoa Holzer	5	G	5'9"	Sophomore	Martigny, Switzerland	Purdue
Danelle Arigbabu	8			Junior	Berlin, Germany	Northeastern Oklahoma A&M College
Jordan Harrison	10	G	5'6"	Sophomore	Oklahoma City, OK	Stephen F. Austin
Zya Nugent	22	G	5'7"	(redshirt) Senior	Denison, TX	Stephen F. Austin
Lauren Fields	23	G	5'9"	GS senior	Shawnee, OK	Arizona
Ashala Moseberry	24	G	5'10"	Junior	Madison, WI	South Plains College
Trinity Moore	35	F	6'0"	Junior	Oklahoma City, OK	Oral Roberts

==== Recruiting ====
There was no recruiting class of 2023.

==== Recruiting class of 2024 ====
College recruiting (2024)
Name	Hometown	School	Height	Weight	Commit date
Destiny Agubata; W	Corona, CA	Santiago High School	6 ft 0 in (1.83 m)	N/A	
Destiny Agubata; W	Recruit ratings: ESPN: (92)				
Jordan Thomas; P	Carrollton, TX	Hebron High School	6 ft 3 in (1.91 m)	N/A	
Jordan Thomas; P	Recruit ratings: ESPN: (92)				
Overall recruit ranking:
Note: In many cases, Scout, Rivals, 247Sports, On3, and ESPN may conflict in their listings of height and weight.; In these cases, the average was taken. ESPN grades are on a 100-point scale.; Sources: "2024 Player Commits". ESPN. Archived from the original on February 20, 2023.

== Roster ==
2023–24 West Virginia Mountaineers women's basketball team
Players
Coaches

Pos.	#	Name	Height	Year	Previous school	Hometown
G	00	Jayla Hemingway	5 ft 11 in (1.8 m)	Sr	Houston; Mississippi State	Collierville, TN
G	5	Ainhoa Holzer	5 ft 9 in (1.75 m)	So	Purdue	Martigny, Switzerland
F	8	Danelle Arigbabu	6 ft 4 in (1.93 m)	Jr	Northeastern Oklahoma A&M College	Berlin, Germany
G	10	Jordan Harrison	5 ft 6 in (1.68 m)	So	Classen SAS; Stephen F. Austin	Oklahoma City, OK
G	11	JJ Quinerly	5 ft 8 in (1.73 m)	Jr	Lake Taylor	Norfolk, VA
F	13	Messiah Hunter	6 ft 2 in (1.88 m)	RS So	TPLS Christian Academy	Hopewell, VA
F	14	Kylee Blacksten	6 ft 3 in (1.91 m)	Sr	Air Academy; Colorado	Colorado Springs, CO
F	21	Tavy Diggs	6 ft 1 in (1.85 m)	GS	Plano East; TCU	Richardson, TX
G	22	Zya Nugent	5 ft 7 in (1.7 m)	RS Sr	Denison; Stephen F. Austin	Denison, TX
G	23	Lauren Fields	5 ft 9 in (1.75 m)	GS	Shawnee; Arizona	Shawnee, OK
G	24	Ashala Moseberry	5 ft 10 in (1.78 m)	Jr	Madison East; South Plains College	Madison, WI
G	32	Kyah Watson	5 ft 10 in (1.78 m)	RS Jr	Stevens; South Dakota	Rapid City, SD
F	35	Trinity Moore	6 ft 0 in (1.83 m)	Jr	Jones; Oral Roberts	Oklahoma City, OK

Head coach

- Mark Kellogg (Austin College)

Assistant coach(es)

- JC Carter (Southwest Baptist)
- Jessica Grayson (Austin Peay)
- Erin Grant (Texas Tech)

Legend

- (C) Team captain
- (S) Suspended
- (I) Ineligible
- (W) Walk-on
- Injured
- Current redshirt

Roster

== Schedule and results ==
Date time, TV	Rank^{#}	Opponent^{#}	Result	Record	Site (attendance) city, state
Non-conference regular season
November 7, 2023*; 7:00 p.m., BIG12/ESPN+		Loyola (MD)	W 74–39	1–0	WVU Coliseum (1,486); Morgantown, WV
November 11, 2023*; 2:00 p.m., ACCNX		at Pittsburgh; Backyard Brawl	W 71–62	2–0	Peterson Events Center (1,505); Pittsburgh, PA
November 19, 2023*; 4:00 p.m., BIG12/ESPN+		Youngtown State	W 94–40	3–0	WVU Coliseum (1,619); Morgantown, WV
November 23, 2023*; 12:30 p.m., FloSports		vs. George Washington; Discover Puerto Rico Classic	W 54–51	4–0	Roberto Clemente Coliseum (250); San Juan, PR
November 24, 2023*; 10:00 a.m., FloSports		vs. Charlotte; Discover Puerto Rico Classic	W 84–56	5–0	Roberto Clemente Coliseum (250); San Juan, PR
November 25, 2023*; 10:00 a.m., FloSports		vs. Southern Illinois; Discover Puerto Rico Classic	W 73–55	6–0	Roberto Clemente Coliseum (250); San Juan, PR
December 2, 2023*; 2:00 p.m., BIG12/ESPN+		St. Bonaventure	W 90–50	7–0	WVU Coliseum (1,535); Morgantown, WV
December 4, 2023*; 6:00 p.m., BIG12/ESPN+		No. 25 Penn State	W 83–65	8–0	WVU Coliseum (2,061); Morgantown, WV
December 10, 2023*; 2:00 p.m., BIG12/ESPN+		Delaware State	W 107–43	9–0	WVU Coliseum (1,522); Morgantown, WV
December 18, 2023*; 10:00 a.m., BIG12/ESPN+		Wright State	W 77–72	10–0	WVU Coliseum (7,535); Morgantown, WV
December 21, 2023*; 2:00 p.m., BIG12/ESPN+		Niagara	W 103–52	11–0	WVU Coliseum (1,304); Morgantown, WV
Big 12 Conference regular season
December 30, 2023; 1:00 p.m., BIG12/ESPN+	No. 25	at Kansas	W 85–60	12–0 (1–0)	Allen Fieldhouse (3,895); Lawrence, KS
January 3, 2024; 7:00 p.m., BIG12/ESPN+	No. 24	Cincinnati	W 68–53	13–0 (2–0)	WVU Coliseum (1,808); Morgantown, WV
January 6, 2024; 2:00 p.m., BIG12/ESPN+	No. 24	No. 10 Texas	L 49–70	13–1 (2–1)	WVU Coliseum (2,601); Morgantown, WV
January 10, 2024; 7:30 p.m., BIG12/ESPN+	No. 24	at Iowa State	L 64–74	13–2 (2–2)	Hilton Coliseum (8,798); Ames, IA
January 13, 2024; 12:00 p.m., BIG12/ESPN+	No. 24	at UCF	W 76–59	14–2 (3–2)	Addition Financial Arena (1,374); Orlando, FL
January 17, 2024; 7:00 p.m., BIG12/ESPN+		Houston	W 80–39	15–2 (4–2)	WVU Coliseum (2,251); Morgantown, WV
January 20, 2024; 4:00 p.m., BIG12/ESPN+		at Cincinnati	W 72–43	16–2 (5–2)	Fifth Third Arena (1,264); Cincinnati, OH
January 27, 2024; 2:00 p.m., BIG12/ESPN+	No. 24	Iowa State	W 84–78	17–2 (6–2)	WVU Coliseum (4,905); Morgantown, WV
January 30, 2024; 7:00 p.m., BIG12/ESPN+	No. 23	UCF	W 84–43	18–2 (7–2)	WVU Coliseum (1,608); Morgantown, WV
February 3, 2024; 6:00 p.m., BIG12/ESPN+	No. 23	at BYU	W 76–69	19–2 (8–2)	Marriott Center (1,754); Provo, UT
February 6, 2024; 7:00 p.m., BIG12/ESPN+	No. 22	Texas Tech	W 82–59	20–2 (9–2)	WVU Coliseum (2,428); Morgantown, WV
February 10, 2024; 3:00 p.m., BIG12/ESPN+	No. 22	at No. 18 Baylor	L 58–65	20–3 (9–3)	Foster Pavilion (4,944); Waco, TX
February 13, 2024; 7:30 p.m., BIG12/ESPN+	No. 24	at TCU	W 77–52	21–3 (10–3)	Schollmaier Arena (2,958); Fort Worth, TX
February 17, 2024; 1:00 p.m., BIG12/ESPN+	No. 24	No. 23 Oklahoma	W 70–66	22–3 (11–3)	WVU Coliseum (3,715); Morgantown, WV
February 21, 2024; 7:30 p.m., BIG12/ESPN+	No. 22	at No. 10 Kansas State	L 64–73 ^{OT}	22–4 (11–4)	Bramlage Coliseum (4,266); Manhattan, KS
February 24, 2024; 2:00 p.m., BIG12/ESPN+	No. 22	No. 24 Baylor	L 65–66	22–5 (11–5)	WVU Coliseum (5,616); Morgantown, WV
February 27, 2024; 7:30 p.m., BIG12/ESPN+	No. 24т	at Oklahoma State	L 61–68	22–6 (11–6)	Gallagher-Iba Arena (1,847); Stillwater, OK
March 2, 2024; 1:00 p.m., BIG12/ESPN+	No. 24т	TCU	W 57–49	23–6 (12–6)	WVU Coliseum (3,789); Morgantown, WV
Big 12 Conference Tournament
March 7, 2024; 9:00 p.m., ESPN+	(6)	vs. (11) Cincinnati; Second Round	W 70–55	24–6	T-Mobile Center (4,402); Kansas City, MO
March 8, 2024; 9:00 p.m., ESPN+	(6)	vs. (3) No. 16 Kansas State; Quarterfinals	L 62–65	24–7	T-Mobile Center (6,610); Kansas City, MO
NCAA Tournament
March 23, 2024*; 5:30 p.m., ESPN2	(8 A2)	vs. (9 A2) Princeton; First Round	W 63–53	25–7	Carver–Hawkeye Arena (14,324); Iowa City, IA
March 25, 2024*; 8:00 p.m., ESPN	(8 A2)	at (1 A2) No. 2 Iowa; Second Round	L 54–64	25–8	Carver–Hawkeye Arena (14,324); Iowa City, IA
*Non-conference game. ^{#}Rankings from AP Poll. (#) Tournament seedings in parentheses. A2=Albany 2. All times are in Eastern Time.

== See also ==
- 2023–24 West Virginia Mountaineers men's basketball team
