= 2023 Northeast Conference women's basketball tournament =

- Classification: Division I
- Season: 2022–23
- Teams: 8
- Site: Campus sites
- Champions: Sacred Heart (4th title)
- Winning coach: Jessica Mannetti (1st title)
- Television: NEC Front Row, ESPN3, ESPNU

The 2023 Northeast Conference Women's Basketball Tournament was the postseason women's basketball tournament for the Northeast Conference for the 2022–23 NCAA Division I women's basketball season. The tournament took place on three dates between March 6, 9 and March 12, 2023, and all tournament games were played on home arenas of the higher-seeded school. The tournament winner received the automatic bid to the NCAA Tournament.

2022–23 Northeast Conference women's basketball standings
	Conf.				Overall
Team	W		L	PCT	W		L	PCT
Fairleigh Dickinson	14	–	2	.875	24	–	8	.750
Sacred Heart†	12	–	4	.750	19	–	14	.576
Merrimack*	10	–	6	.625	15	–	16	.484
St. Francis Brooklyn	9	–	7	.563	11	–	19	.367
Wagner	8	–	8	.500	13	–	15	.464
Saint Francis (PA)	6	–	10	.375	7	–	22	.241
Stonehill*	5	–	11	.313	9	–	20	.310
LIU	5	–	11	.313	7	–	22	.241
Central Connecticut	3	–	13	.188	7	–	22	.241
† 2023 NEC tournament winner * ineligible for the 2023 NCAA tournament due to transition period As of March 17, 2023

== Seeds ==
All eight eligible teams of the nine members of the conference qualified. Effective for the 2022–23 academic year, NEC teams transitioning from Division II were eligible for the NEC tournament during their third and fourth years of the transition period. If a reclassifying institution won the NEC tournament championship, the conference's automatic bid to the NCAA tournament went to the NEC tournament runner up. The rule change regarding reclassifying institutions resulted in Merrimack being eligible for the 2023 NEC tournament, since it is in its fourth transition year.

Teams were seeded by record within the conference, with a tiebreaker system to seed teams with identical conference records.

Stonehill College joined the Northeast Conference from the Division II Northeast-10 Conference. Stonehill was ineligible for the NCAA tournament until the 2026–27 season during its four-year reclassification period and won't be eligible for the NEC tournament until the 2024–25 season.

Seed	School	Conf.
1	Fairleigh Dickinson	14-2
2	Sacred Heart	12-4
3	Merrimack	10-6
4	St. Francis Brooklyn	9-7
5	Wagner	8-8
6	Saint Francis (PA)	6-10
7	LIU	5-11
8	Central Connecticut	3-13

== Schedule ==
Session	Game	Time*	Matchup	Score	Television
Quarterfinals – Monday, March 6
1	1	7:00 pm	No. 8 Central Connecticut at No. 1 Fairleigh Dickinson	48-74	NEC Front Row
1	2	7:00 pm	No. 7 LIU at No. 2 Sacred Heart	44-63	NEC Front Row
2	3	7:00 pm	No. 6 Saint Francis (PA) at No. 3 Merrimack	60-66	NEC Front Row
2	4	7:00 pm	No. 5 Wagner at No. 4 St. Francis Brooklyn	51-58	NEC Front Row
Semifinals – Thursday, March 9
3	5	7:00 pm	No. 4 St. Francis Brooklyn at No. 1 Fairleigh Dickinson	40-59	SNY, ESPN3
3	6	7:00 pm	No. 3 Merrimack at No. 2 Sacred Heart	61-68	SNY, ESPN3
Championship – Sunday, March 12
4	7	12:00 pm	No. 2 Sacred Heart at No. 1 Fairleigh Dickinson	72-60	ESPN3/ESPNU
*Game times in ET. Rankings denote tournament seed

== Bracket ==
Teams were reseeded after each round with highest remaining seeds receiving home court advantage.

Quarterfinals; Monday, March 6 NEC Front Row
1	Fairleigh Dickinson	74
8	Central Connecticut	48
4	St. Francis Brooklyn	58
5	Wagner	51
(Pairings are reseeded after the first round)
2	Sacred Heart	63
7	LIU	44
3	Merrimack	66
6	Saint Francis (PA)	60

Semifinals; Thursday, March 9, NEC Front Row
1	Fairleigh Dickinson	59
4	St. Francis Brooklyn	40
2	Sacred Heart	68
3	Merrimack	61

Championship; Sunday, March 12; ESPN3/ESPNU
1	Fairleigh Dickinson	60
2	Sacred Heart	72
