= Mannetti =

Mannetti is a surname. Notable people with the surname include:

- Jessica Mannetti American basketball coach
- Ricardo Mannetti (born 1975), Namibian footballer
