= 2023 MAAC women's basketball tournament =

- Classification: Division I
- Season: 2022–23
- Teams: 11
- Site: Jim Whelan Boardwalk Hall; Atlantic City, New Jersey
- Champions: Iona (2nd title)
- Winning coach: Billi Chambers (2nd title)
- Television: ESPNU, ESPN+

2022–23 MAAC women's basketball standings
	Conf.				Overall
Team	W		L	PCT	W		L	PCT
Iona†	18	–	2	.900	26	–	6	.813
Quinnipiac	16	–	4	.800	21	–	9	.700
Niagara	16	–	4	.800	18	–	13	.581
Siena	12	–	8	.600	19	–	13	.594
Fairfield	11	–	9	.550	15	–	15	.500
Manhattan	10	–	10	.500	16	–	17	.485
Marist	8	–	12	.400	12	–	18	.400
Mount St. Mary's	7	–	13	.350	12	–	19	.387
Canisius	6	–	14	.300	9	–	21	.300
Rider	6	–	14	.300	10	–	21	.323
Saint Peter's	0	–	20	.000	0	–	30	.000
† 2023 MAAC tournament winner As of March 17, 2023

The 2023 Metro Atlantic Athletic Conference women's basketball tournament is the postseason women's basketball tournament for the Metro Atlantic Athletic Conference for the 2022–23 NCAA Division I women's basketball season. The tournament started on March 7 and concluded on March 11 and was played at the Jim Whelan Boardwalk Hall in Atlantic City, New Jersey, for the fourth year in a row. Iona won the title after beating Manhattan in the tournament final. The tournament winner will receive the conference's automatic bid to the 2023 NCAA Division I women's basketball tournament.

== Seeds ==
All 11 teams in the conference will participate in the Tournament. The top five teams will receive byes to the quarterfinals. Teams are seeded by record within the conference, with a tiebreaker system to seed teams with identical conference records.

Seed	School	Conference	Tiebreaker 1	Tiebreaker 2
1	Iona	18-2		
2	Niagara	16-4	2-0 vs. Quinnipiac	
3	Quinnipiac	16-4	0-2 vs. Niagara	
4	Siena	12-8		
5	Fairfield	11-9		
6	Manhattan	10-10		
7	Marist	8-12		
8	Mount St. Mary's	7-13		
9	Canisius	6-14	1-1 vs. Rider	1-1 vs. Fairfield
10	Rider	6-14	1-1 vs. Canisius	0-2 vs. Fairfield
11	Saint Peter's	0-20		

== Schedule ==
Session	Game	Time*	Matchup	Score	Attendance	Television
First Round – Tuesday, March 7
1	1	10:30 AM	No. 8 Mount St. Mary's vs No. 9 Canisius	54–41		ESPN+
1	2	12:30 PM	No. 7 Marist vs No. 10 Rider	63–50		ESPN+
1	3	2:30 PM	No. 6 Manhattan vs No. 11 Saint Peter's	59–56		ESPN+
Quarterfinals – Wednesday, March 8
2	4	1:00 PM	No. 1 Iona vs No. 8 Mount St. Mary's	39–37		ESPN+
2	5	3:30 PM	No. 2 Niagara vs No. 10 Rider	67–64		ESPN+
Quarterfinals – Thursday, March 9
3	6	1:00 PM	No. 3 Quinnipiac vs No. 6 Manhattan	43–50		ESPN+
3	7	3:30 PM	No. 4 Siena vs No. 5 Fairfield	59–53		ESPN+
Semifinals – Friday, March 10
4	8	11:00 AM	No. 1 Iona vs No. 4 Siena	67–66		ESPN+
4	9	1:30 PM	No. 2 Niagara vs No. 6 Manhattan	68–81		ESPN+
Championship – Saturday, March 11
5	10	3:30 PM	No. 1 Iona vs No. 6 Manhattan	73-60		ESPNU
*Game times in ET. ()-Rankings denote tournament seeding.

== Bracket ==
First round Tuesday, March 7
8	Mount St. Mary's	54
9	Canisius	41
7	Marist	50
10	Rider	63
6	Manhattan	59
11	Saint Peter's	56

Quarterfinals; Wednesday & Thursday, March 8 and 9
1	Iona	39
8	Mount St. Mary's	37
4	Siena	59
5	Fairfield	53
2	Niagara	67
10	Rider	64
3	Quinnipiac	43
6	Manhattan	50

Semifinals; Friday, March 10
1	Iona	67
4	Siena	66
2	Niagara	68
6	Manhattan	81

Championship; Saturday, March 11
1	Iona	73
6	Manhattan	60

== See also ==
- 2023 MAAC men's basketball tournament
