= 2023 Big Sky Conference women's basketball tournament =

- Classification: Division I
- Season: 2022–23
- Teams: 10
- Site: Idaho Central Arena; Boise, Idaho
- Champions: Sacramento State (1st title)
- Winning coach: Mark Campbell (1st title)
- Television: ESPN+, ESPNU

2022–23 Big Sky women's basketball standings
| | Conf. | | | | Overall |
| Team | W | | L | PCT | W | | L | PCT |
|---|---|---|---|---|---|---|---|---|
| Sacramento State† | 13 | – | 5 | .722 | 25 | – | 7 | .781 |
| Montana State | 13 | – | 5 | .722 | 20 | – | 11 | .645 |
| Northern Arizona | 13 | – | 5 | .722 | 21 | – | 14 | .600 |
| Eastern Washington | 11 | – | 7 | .611 | 19 | – | 11 | .633 |
| Montana | 10 | – | 8 | .556 | 14 | – | 16 | .467 |
| Idaho | 9 | – | 9 | .500 | 13 | – | 17 | .433 |
| Portland State | 8 | – | 10 | .444 | 15 | – | 16 | .484 |
| Idaho State | 6 | – | 12 | .333 | 11 | – | 19 | .367 |
| Northern Colorado | 5 | – | 13 | .278 | 13 | – | 18 | .419 |
| Weber State | 2 | – | 16 | .111 | 6 | – | 25 | .194 |
† 2023 Big Sky tournament winner As of March 17, 2023

The 2023 Big Sky Conference women's basketball tournament was the postseason tournament for the Big Sky Conference, held March 4–8 at Idaho Central Arena in Boise, Idaho. It was the 40th edition of the tournament, which debuted in 1983. The winner will receive the Big Sky's automatic bid to the 2023 NCAA tournament.

== Seeds ==
The ten teams were seeded by conference record, with a tiebreaker system for identical conference records. The top six teams will receive a first-round bye.

| Seed | School | Record | Tiebreaker |
|---|---|---|---|
| 1 | Northern Arizona | 13-5 | 4-0 vs. Montana State/Sacramento State |
| 2 | Montana State | 13-5 | 1-3 vs. Northern Arizona/Sacramento State; 2-0 vs. Montana |
| 3 | Sacramento State | 13-5 | 1-3 vs. Northern Arizona/Montana State; 1-1 vs. Montana |
| 4 | Eastern Washington | 11-7 | |
| 5 | Montana | 10-8 | |
| 6 | Idaho | 9-9 | |
| 7 | Portland State | 8-10 | |
| 8 | Idaho State | 6-12 | |
| 9 | Northern Colorado | 5-13 | |
| 10 | Weber State | 2-16 | |

== Schedule ==
| Session | Game | Time | Matchup | Score | Television | Attendance |
First round – Saturday, March 4
| 1 | 1 | 12:00 pm | No. 9 Northern Colorado vs. No. 10 Weber State | 63–52 | ESPN+ | |
| 1 | 2 | 2:30 pm | No. 7 Portland State vs. No. 8 Idaho State | 73–58 | ESPN+ | |
Quarterfinals – Sunday, March 5 & Monday, March 6
| 2 | 3 | 12:00 pm | No. 1 Northern Arizona vs. No. 9 Northern Colorado | 64–48 | ESPN+ | |
| 2 | 4 | 2:30 pm | No. 2 Montana State vs. No. 7 Portland State | 65–77 | ESPN+ | |
| 3 | 5 | 12:00 pm | No. 4 Eastern Washington vs. No. 5 Montana | 72-64 | ESPN+ | |
| 3 | 6 | 2:30 pm | No. 3 Sacramento State vs. No. 6 Idaho | 73–58 | ESPN+ | |
Semifinals – Tuesday, March 7
| 4 | 7 | 12:00 pm | No. 1 Northern Arizona vs. No. 4 Eastern Washington | 74-57 | ESPN+ | |
| 4 | 8 | 2:30 pm | No. 7 Portland State vs. No. 3 Sacramento State | 42-60 | ESPN+ | |
Championship game – Wednesday, March 8
| 5 | 9 | 2:00 pm | No. 1 Northern Arizona vs. No. 3 Sacramento State | 63-76 | ESPNU | |
Game times in MT. Rankings denote tournament seeding.

== Bracket ==
First round March 4 ESPN+
9 | Northern Colorado | 63
10 | Weber State | 52
7 | Portland State | 73
8 | Idaho State | 58

Quarterfinals; March 5 & 6 ESPN+
1 | Northern Arizona | 64
9 | Northern Colorado | 48
4 | Eastern Washington | 72
5 | Montana | 64
2 | Montana State | 65
7 | Portland State | 77
3 | Sacramento State | 73
6 | Idaho | 58

Semifinals; March 7 ESPNU/ESPN2
1 | Northern Arizona | 74
4 | Eastern Washington | 57
7 | Portland State | 42
3 | Sacramento State | 60

Championship; March 8 ESPN2
1 | Northern Arizona | 63
3 | Sacramento State | 76

== See also ==
- 2023 Big Sky Conference men's basketball tournament
