= 2022–23 Sacramento State Hornets women's basketball team =

American college basketball season

2022–23 Sacramento State Hornets women's basketball

Big Sky regular season co-champions and tournament champions

NCAA tournament, First round
- Conference: Big Sky Conference
- Record: 25–8 (13–5 Big Sky)
- Head coach: Mark Campbell (2nd season)
- Assistant coaches: Xavier López; Minyon Moore; Nyara Sabally
- Home arena: Hornets Nest

2022–23 Big Sky women's basketball standings
	Conf.				Overall
Team	W		L	PCT	W		L	PCT
Sacramento State†	13	–	5	.722	25	–	7	.781
Montana State	13	–	5	.722	20	–	11	.645
Northern Arizona	13	–	5	.722	21	–	14	.600
Eastern Washington	11	–	7	.611	19	–	11	.633
Montana	10	–	8	.556	14	–	16	.467
Idaho	9	–	9	.500	13	–	17	.433
Portland State	8	–	10	.444	15	–	16	.484
Idaho State	6	–	12	.333	11	–	19	.367
Northern Colorado	5	–	13	.278	13	–	18	.419
Weber State	2	–	16	.111	6	–	25	.194
† 2023 Big Sky tournament winner As of March 17, 2023

The 2022–23 Sacramento State Hornets women's basketball team represented California State University, Sacramento during the 2022–23 NCAA Division I women's basketball season. The Hornets were led by second-year head coach Mark Campbell and played their home games at Hornets Nest. They were members of the Big Sky Conference.

== Roster ==
2022–23 Sacramento State Hornets women's basketball team
Players
Coaches

Pos.	#	Name	Height	Year	Previous school	Hometown
G	0	Kahlaijah Dean	5 ft 6 in (1.68 m)	Sr	Independence HS; Oakland	Herriman, UT
G	1	Benthe Versteeg	5 ft 9 in (1.75 m)	RS Fr	Loon Lions	Amsterdam-Zuid, Netherlands
G	2	Kaylie Edge	5 ft 10 in (1.78 m)	RS Fr	Salesian College Prep	Richmond, CA
F	3	Solape Amusan	6 ft 1 in (1.85 m)	Sr	Woodbury HS; Illinois	Woodbury, MN
G/F	10	Madison Butcher	6 ft 1 in (1.85 m)	Fr	Del Oro HS	Loomis, CA
G	11	Akaysha Muggeridge	5 ft 8 in (1.73 m)	Fr	Emmaus College	Rockhampton, Australia
G	20	Katie Peneueta	6 ft 2 in (1.88 m)	So	Heritage HS	Vancouver, WA
G	21	Kaylin Randhawa	6 ft 2 in (1.88 m)	Sr	Pitman HS; Utah State	Turlock, CA
G	23	Jordan Olivares	5 ft 8 in (1.73 m)	Sr	Seaside HS	Seaside, CA
C	24	Isnelle Natabou	6 ft 5 in (1.96 m)	Jr	Iowa Western CC	Česká Lípa, Czech Republic
G/F	31	Irune Orio	6 ft 1 in (1.85 m)	Fr	IES Balmaseda BHI	Balmaseda, Spain
F	33	Erin Hedman	6 ft 3 in (1.91 m)	Jr	New Berlin HS	New Berlin, WI

Head coach

- Mark Campbell (Hawaiʻi)

Assistant coach(es)

- Xavier López (Point Loma)
- Minyon Moore (Oregon)
- Nyara Sabally (Oregon)

Legend

- (C) Team captain
- (S) Suspended
- (I) Ineligible
- (W) Walk-on
- Injured
- Current redshirt

Roster
Last update: May 21, 2024

== Schedule ==
Date time, TV	Rank^{#}	Opponent^{#}	Result	Record	Site (attendance) city, state
Non-conference regular season
November 12, 2022*; 1:00 p.m., ESPN+		UC Irvine	L 58–60	0–1	Hornets Nest (640); Sacramento, CA
November 14, 2022*; 6:00 p.m., WCC Network		at Santa Clara	W 73–63	1–1	Leavey Center; Santa Clara, CA
November 19, 2022*; 6:00 p.m., ESPN+		UC Santa Barbara	W 70–68 ^{OT}	2–1	Hornets Nest (549); Sacramento, CA
November 22, 2022*; 5:00 p.m.		vs. UC Davis; Causeway Cup	W 67–45	3–1	Golden 1 Center (1,345); Sacramento, CA
November 25, 2022*; 12:00 p.m., ESPN+		at Cal Poly; Holiday Beach Classic	W 70–62	4–1	Mott Athletics Center (662); San Luis Obispo, CA
November 26, 2022*; 12:00 p.m.		vs. UTEP; Holiday Beach Classic	W 63–50	5–1	Mott Athletics Center (113); San Luis Obispo, CA
December 3, 2022*; 2:00 p.m., ESPN+		Fresno State	W 62–61	6–1	Hornets Nest (315); Sacramento, CA
December 7, 2022*; 11:00 a.m., MW Network		at San Diego State	L 59–70	6–2	Viejas Arena (2,102); San Diego, CA
December 10, 2022*; 1:00 p.m., ESPN+		Cal State Bakersfield	W 67–46	7–2	Hornets Nest (710); Sacramento, CA
December 19, 2022*; 4:00 p.m., ESPN+		at Cal State Northridge	W 63–61	8–2	Premier America Credit Union Arena (251); Northridge, CA
December 21, 2022*; 3:00 p.m., ESPN+		at Cal State Fullerton	W 67–55	9–2	Titan Gym (138); Fullerton, CA
Big Sky regular season
December 31, 2022; 2:00 p.m., ESPN+		at Portland State	W 65–56	10–2 (1–0)	Viking Pavilion (512); Portland, OR
January 5, 2023; 7:00 p.m., ESPN+		Idaho	W 71–56	11–2 (2–0)	Hornets Nest (288); Sacramento, CA
January 7, 2023; 2:00 p.m., ESPN+		Eastern Washington	W 82–74	12–2 (3–0)	Hornets Nest (352); Sacramento, CA
January 12, 2023; 5:00 p.m., ESPN+		at Northern Colorado	W 73–41	13–2 (4–0)	Bank of Colorado Arena (682); Greeley, CO
January 14, 2023; 1:00 p.m., ESPN+		at Northern Arizona	L 67–77	13–3 (4–1)	Walkup Skydome (306); Flagstaff, AZ
January 19, 2023; 7:00 p.m., ESPN+		Idaho State	W 66–52	14–3 (5–1)	Hornets Nest (397); Sacramento, CA
January 21, 2023; 1:00 p.m., ESPN+		Weber State	W 70–44	15–3 (6–1)	Hornets Nest (631); Sacramento, CA
January 26, 2023; 6:00 p.m., ESPN+		at Montana	L 77–81	15–4 (6–2)	Dahlberg Arena (2,292); Missoula, MT
January 28, 2023; 12:00 p.m., ESPN+		at Montana State	L 60–61	15–5 (6–3)	Brick Breeden Fieldhouse (2,148); Bozeman, MT
February 2, 2023; 6:00 p.m., ESPN+		at Eastern Washington	L 53–64	15–6 (6–4)	Reese Court (604); Cheney, WA
February 4, 2023; 2:00 p.m., ESPN+		at Idaho	W 77–70	16–6 (7–4)	ICCU Arena (1,349); Moscow, ID
February 9, 2023; 7:00 p.m., ESPN+		Northern Arizona	L 82–84 ^{OT}	16–7 (7–5)	Hornets Nest (457); Sacramento, CA
February 11, 2023; 2:00 p.m., ESPN+		Northern Colorado	W 79–48	17–7 (8–5)	Hornets Nest (457); Sacramento, CA
February 16, 2023; 5:00 p.m., ESPN+		at Weber State	W 66–52	18–7 (9–5)	Dee Events Center (178); Ogden, UT
February 18, 2023; 1:00 p.m., ESPN+		at Idaho State	W 66–52	19–7 (10–5)	Reed Gym (968); Pocatello, ID
February 23, 2023; 7:00 p.m., ESPN+		Montana State	W 82–73	20–7 (11–5)	Hornets Nest (823); Sacramento, CA
February 25, 2023; 1:00 p.m., ESPN+		Montana	W 63–56	21–7 (12–5)	Hornets Nest (420); Sacramento, CA
February 27, 2023; 7:00 p.m., ESPN+		Portland State	W 80–54	22–7 (13–5)	Hornets Nest (710); Sacramento, CA
Big Sky women's tournament
March 6, 2023; 1:30 p.m., ESPN+	(3)	vs. (6) Idaho; Quarterfinals	W 73–58	23–7	Idaho Central Arena; Boise, ID
March 7, 2023; 1:30 p.m., ESPN+	(3)	vs. (7) Portland State; Semifinals	W 60–42	24–7	Idaho Central Arena; Boise, ID
March 7, 2023; 1:00 p.m., ESPNU	(3)	vs. (1) Northern Arizona; Championship game	W 76–63	25–7	Idaho Central Arena; Boise, ID
NCAA women's tournament
March 18, 2023*; 8:30 p.m., ESPN2	(13 G1)	at (4 G1) No. 14 UCLA; First round	L 45–67	25–8	Pauley Pavilion; Los Angeles, CA
*Non-conference game. ^{#}Rankings from AP poll. (#) Tournament seedings in parentheses. G1=Greenville 1. All times are in Pacific Time.

== See also ==
- 2022–23 Sacramento State Hornets men's basketball team
