= 2023–24 TCU Horned Frogs women's basketball team =

Intercollegiate basketball season team

2023–24 TCU Horned Frogs women's basketball

WBIT, Second Round
- Conference: Big 12 Conference
- Record: 21–12 (6–12 Big 12)
- Head coach: Mark Campbell (1st season)
- Assistant coaches: Xavier Lopez; Minyon Moore; Nia Jackson; Ruthy Hebard; Jessie Craig
- Home arena: Schollmaier Arena

2023–24 Big 12 Conference women's basketball standings
	Conf.				Overall
Team	W		L	PCT	W		L	PCT
No. 21 Oklahoma	15	–	3	.833	23	–	10	.697
No. 7 Texas †	14	–	4	.778	33	–	5	.868
No. 19 Kansas State	13	–	5	.722	26	–	8	.765
No. 25 Iowa State	12	–	6	.667	21	–	12	.636
No. 13 Baylor	12	–	6	.667	26	–	8	.765
No. 24 West Virginia	12	–	6	.667	25	–	8	.758
Kansas	11	–	7	.611	20	–	13	.606
Oklahoma State	7	–	11	.389	14	–	16	.467
TCU	6	–	12	.333	21	–	12	.636
BYU	6	–	12	.333	16	–	17	.485
Cincinnati	5	–	13	.278	14	–	18	.438
Texas Tech	5	–	13	.278	17	–	16	.515
Houston	5	–	13	.278	14	–	16	.467
UCF	3	–	15	.167	12	–	17	.414
† 2024 Big 12 tournament winner Rankings from AP poll

The 2023–24 TCU Horned Frogs women's basketball team represented Texas Christian University during the 2023–24 NCAA Division I women's basketball season. The Horned Frogs, were led by first-year head coach Mark Campbell and played their home games at the Schollmaier Arena as members of the Big 12 Conference.

TCU started 14–0 and was nationally ranked, but lost its next four games and had to forfeit the next two due to a lack of healthy players. To remedy the situation, TCU held open tryouts and four walk-on players were added on January 23, including volleyball player Sarah Sylvester.

== Previous season ==
The Horned Frogs finished the season 8–23, 1–17 in Big 12 play to finish in last place. In the Big 12 Tournament, they defeated Kansas in the first round before losing to Oklahoma in the quarterfinals.

== Offseason ==
=== Departures ===
TCU Departures
Name	Number	Pos.	Height	Year	Hometown	Reason for Departure
Tomi Taiwo	1	G	5'10"	GS Senior	Carmel, IN	Graduated
Mariah Roberts	3	G	5'8"	(redshirt) Freshman	Fort Worth, TX	
Emily Fisher	5	G	5'7"	Senior	Melbourne, Australia	Graduated
Lucy Ibeh	21	F	6'0"	GS Senior	Pearland, TX	Graduated
Evie Goetz	22	F	6'1"	(redshirt) Freshman	Denton, TX	Transferred to Louisiana Tech
Roxane Makolo	30	G	5'10"	Senior	Saint-Hubert, QC	Graduate transferred to USC
Patricia Morris	32	F	6'7"	Senior	Duarte, CA	Graduated

=== Incoming ===
TCU incoming transfers
Name	Num	Pos.	Height	Year	Hometown	Previous School
Jaden Owens	1	G	5'8"	GS Senior	Plano, TX	Baylor
Madison Conner	3	G	5'11"	Junior	Chandler, AZ	Arizona
Una Jovanovic	5	G	5'9"	Junior	Santa Clara, CA	Cal State Fullerton
Sedona Prince	13	F	6'7"	GS Senior	Liberty Hill, TX	Oregon
Agnes Emma-Nnopu	21	G	5'11"	Senior	Ocean Grove, Australia	Stanford
Sydney Harris	25	G/F	6'1"	Sophomore	Edwardsville, IN	Central Michigan

==== Recruiting ====
College recruiting
Name	Hometown	School	Height	Weight	Commit date
Victoria Flores; PG	Duncanville, TX	Duncanville High School	5 ft 7 in (1.70 m)	N/A	
Victoria Flores; PG	Recruit ratings: ESPN: (93)				
Jade Clack; W	Austin, TX	Austin High School	6 ft 1 in (1.85 m)	N/A	
Jade Clack; W	Recruit ratings: ESPN: (92)				
Overall recruit ranking:
Note: In many cases, Scout, Rivals, 247Sports, On3, and ESPN may conflict in their listings of height and weight.; In these cases, the average was taken. ESPN grades are on a 100-point scale.; Sources: "2023 Player Commits". ESPN. Archived from the original on December 15, 2023.

== Roster ==
2023–24 TCU Horned Frogs women's basketball team
Players
Coaches

Pos.	#	Name	Height	Year	Previous school	Hometown
G	1	Jaden Owens	5 ft 8 in (1.73 m)	GS	Plano West; Baylor	Plano, TX
G	2	Tara Manumaleuga	5 ft 10 in (1.78 m)	GS	Hillcrest Christian; Arizona	Gold Coast, QLD, Australia
G	3	Madison Conner	5 ft 11 in (1.8 m)	Jr	AZ Compass Prep; Arizona	Chandler, AZ
F	4	Sarah Sylvester (W)	6 ft 3 in (1.91 m)	So	Marian	Livonia, MI
G	5	Una Jovanovic	5 ft 9 in (1.75 m)	Jr	Pinewood; Cal State Fullerton	Santa Clara, CA
G	10	Piper Davis (W)	5 ft 8 in (1.73 m)	Fr	Timberline	Boise, ID
G	11	Knisha Godfrey	5 ft 9 in (1.75 m)	RS So	Tampa Bay Technical; Mississippi State	Tampa, FL
F	12	Bre'Yon White	5 ft 11 in (1.8 m)	Jr	Shadow Creek; Oklahoma	Pearland, TX
F	13	Sedona Prince	6 ft 7 in (2.01 m)	GS	Liberty Hill HS; Oregon	Liberty Hill, TX
F	14	Jade Clack	6 ft 1 in (1.85 m)	Fr	Austin	Austin, TX
G	15	Paige Bradley	5 ft 10 in (1.78 m)	Jr	Bishop Lynch	Dallas, TX
G	20	Ella Hamlin (W)	5 ft 9 in (1.75 m)	Fr	Granbury	Granbury, TX
G	21	Agnes Emma-Nnopu	5 ft 11 in (1.8 m)	Sr	Lake Ginninderra College; Stanford	Ocean Grove, Australia
G	22	Mekhayia Moore (W)	5 ft 7 in (1.7 m)	So	Brownsboro	Brownsboro, TX
F	23	Aaliyah Roberson	6 ft 2 in (1.88 m)	So	Clark	San Antonio, TX
F	24	DaiJa Turner	6 ft 3 in (1.91 m)	RS So	Village Christian Academy	Fayetteville, NC
G/F	25	Sydney Harris	6 ft 1 in (1.85 m)	So	Edwardsville; Central Michigan	Edwardsville, IL
G	55	Victoria Flores	5 ft 7 in (1.7 m)	Fr	Duncanville	West Dallas, TX

Head coach

- Mark Campbell (Hawaiʻi)

Assistant coach(es)

- Xavier López (Point Loma)
- Minyon Moore (Oregon)
- Nia Jackson (Oregon)
- Ruthy Hebard (Oregon)
- Jessie Craig (Alaska–Anchorage)

Legend

- (C) Team captain
- (S) Suspended
- (I) Ineligible
- (W) Walk-on
- Injured
- Current redshirt

Roster

== Schedule ==
Date time, TV	Rank^{#}	Opponent^{#}	Result	Record	Site (attendance) city, state
Non-conference regular season
November 6, 2023*; 4:00 p.m., BIG12/ESPN+		Oral Roberts	W 76–56	1–0	Schollmaier Arena (1,622); Fort Worth, TX
November 8, 2023*; 6:30 p.m., BIG12/ESPN+		Texas A&M-Kingsville	W 86–48	2–0	Schollmaier Arena (1,450); Fort Worth, TX
November 12, 2023*; 1:00 p.m., BIG12/ESPN+		Rice	W 67–42	3–0	Schollmaier Arena (1,788); Fort Worth, TX
November 15, 2023*; 12:00 p.m., BIG12/ESPN+		Incarnate Word	W 61–55	4–0	Schollmaier Arena (4,754); Fort Worth, TX
November 19, 2023*; 1:00 p.m., BIG12/ESPN+		Army; Maggie Dixon Classic	W 88–51	5–0	Schollmaier Arena (1,957); Fort Worth, TX
November 23, 2023*; 12:00 p.m.		vs. UTEP; St. Pete Showcase	W 85–56	6–0	McArthur Center (253); St. Petersburg, FL
November 25, 2023*; 12:00 p.m.		vs. Nebraska; St. Pete Showcase	W 88–81	7–0	McArthur Center (252); St. Petersburg, FL
December 1, 2023*; 6:30 p.m., BIG12/ESPN+		Tulsa	W 82–50	8–0	Schollmaier Arena (2,203); Fort Worth, TX
December 5, 2023*; 6:30 p.m., BIG12/ESPN+		Abilene Christian	W 77–60	9–0	Schollmaier Arena (1,781); Fort Worth, TX
December 10, 2023*; 2:00 p.m., BIG12/ESPN+		Prairie View A&M	W 85–41	10–0	Schollmaier Arena (N/A); Fort Worth, TX
December 17, 2023*; 2:00 p.m., BIG12/ESPN+		Lamar	W 68–51	11–0	Schollmaier Arena (1,947); Fort Worth, TX
December 20, 2023*; 6:30 p.m., BIG12/ESPN+	No. 25	Omaha	W 96–56	12–0	Schollmaier Arena (1,735); Fort Worth, TX
December 22, 2023*; 6:30 p.m., BIG12/ESPN+	No. 25	Mount St. Mary's	W 87–34	13–0	Schollmaier Arena (2,271); Fort Worth, TX
Big 12 Conference regular season
December 30, 2023; 4:00 p.m., BIG12/ESPN+	No. 23	BYU	W 81–67	14–0 (1–0)	Schollmaier Arena (2,572); Fort Worth, TX
January 3, 2024; 7:00 p.m., BIG12/ESPN+	No. 23	at No. 6 Baylor	L 50–71	14–1 (1–1)	Foster Pavilion (5,905); Waco, TX
January 6, 2024; 4:00 p.m., BIG12/ESPN+	No. 23	Oklahoma State	L 59–67	14–2 (1–2)	Schollmaier Arena (2,869); Fort Worth, TX
January 10, 2024; 7:00 p.m., LHN		at No. 10 Texas	L 60–72	14–3 (1–3)	Moody Center (6,009); Austin, TX
January 13, 2024; 2:00 p.m., BIG12/ESPN+		at Houston	L 66–77	14–4 (1–4)	Fertitta Center (1,635); Houston, TX
January 17, 2024; 6:30 p.m., BIG12/ESPN+		No. 7 Kansas State	L 0–2 Forfeit	14–4 (1–5)	Schollmaier Arena; Fort Worth, TX
January 20, 2024; 1:00 p.m., BIG12/ESPN+		at No. 24 Iowa State	L 0–2 Forfeit	14–4 (1–6)	Hilton Coliseum; Ames, IA
January 23, 2024; 6:30 p.m., BIG12/ESPN+		UCF	W 66–60	15–4 (2–6)	Schollmaier Arena (2,249); Fort Worth, TX
January 27, 2024; 2:00 p.m., BIG12/ESPN+		at Texas Tech	L 65–71	15–5 (2–7)	United Supermarkets Arena (7,530); Lubbock, TX
February 3, 2024; 6:00 p.m., BIG12/ESPN+		Kansas	L 74–81	15–6 (2–8)	Schollmaier Arena (2,961); Fort Worth, TX
February 7, 2024; 6:00 p.m., BIG12/ESPN+		at No. 24 Oklahoma	L 55–72	15–7 (2–9)	Lloyd Noble Center (3,241); Norman, OK
February 10, 2024; 4:00 p.m., BIG12/ESPN+		No. 7 Texas	L 43–65	15–8 (2–10)	Schollmaier Arena (3,685); Fort Worth, TX
February 13, 2024; 6:30 p.m., BIG12/ESPN+		No. 24 West Virginia	L 52–77	15–9 (2–11)	Schollmaier Arena (2,958); Fort Worth, TX
February 17, 2024; 1:00 p.m., BIG12/ESPN+		at Cincinnati	W 79–72	16–9 (3–11)	Fifth Third Arena (1,952); Cincinnati, OH
February 21, 2024; 6:00 p.m., BIG12/ESPN+		at BYU	W 68–58	17–9 (4–11)	Marriott Center (1,451); Provo, UT
February 24, 2024; 6:00 p.m., BIG12/ESPN+		Houston	W 59–49	18–9 (5–11)	Schollmaier Arena (2,133); Fort Worth, TX
February 28, 2024; 6:30 p.m., BIG12/ESPN+		Texas Tech	W 73–52	19–9 (6–11)	Schollmaier Arena (2,237); Fort Worth, TX
March 2, 2024; 12:00 p.m., BIG12/ESPN+		at No. 24т West Virginia	L 49–57	19–10 (6–12)	WVU Coliseum (3,789); Morgantown, WV
Big 12 Conference Tournament
March 8, 2024; 1:30 p.m., ESPN+	(9)	vs. (8) Oklahoma State; Second Round	W 68–66	20–10	T-Mobile Center (3,730); Kansas City, MO
March 9, 2024; 1:30 p.m., ESPN+	(9)	vs. (1) No. 19 Oklahoma; Quarterfinals	L 53–69	20–11	T-Mobile Center (4,963); Kansas City, MO
WBIT
March 21, 2024*; 6:30 p.m., ESPN+	(3)	North Texas; First Round	W 67–58	21–11	Schollmaier Arena (1,634); Fort Worth, TX
March 24, 2024*; 2:00 p.m., ESPN+	(3)	at (2) Mississippi State; Second Round	L 61–68	21–12	Humphrey Coliseum (1,607); Starkville, MS
*Non-conference game. ^{#}Rankings from AP Poll. (#) Tournament seedings in parentheses. All times are in Central Time.

== See also ==
- 2023–24 TCU Horned Frogs men's basketball team
