= 2022–23 Northeast Conference women's basketball season =

- League: NCAA Division I
- Sport: Basketball
- Teams: 9
- TV partner(s): NEC Front Row, ESPN2, MSG, FCS, Regional Sports Networks

WNBA Draft

Regular season

NEC tournament

Northeast Conference women's basketball seasons
- ← 2021–22 2023–24 →

2022–23 Northeast Conference women's basketball standings
	Conf.				Overall
Team	W		L	PCT	W		L	PCT
Fairleigh Dickinson	14	–	2	.875	24	–	8	.750
Sacred Heart†	12	–	4	.750	19	–	14	.576
Merrimack*	10	–	6	.625	15	–	16	.484
St. Francis Brooklyn	9	–	7	.563	11	–	19	.367
Wagner	8	–	8	.500	13	–	15	.464
Saint Francis (PA)	6	–	10	.375	7	–	22	.241
Stonehill*	5	–	11	.313	9	–	20	.310
LIU	5	–	11	.313	7	–	22	.241
Central Connecticut	3	–	13	.188	7	–	22	.241
† 2023 NEC tournament winner * ineligible for the 2023 NCAA tournament due to transition period As of March 17, 2023

The 2022–23 Northeast Conference women's basketball season will begin with practices in October 2023, followed by the start of the 2022–23 NCAA Division I women's basketball season in November. Conference play will start in January and end in March 2023.

The NEC tournament will be held in March with the higher-seeded team hosting each game.

== Changes from last season ==
Stonehill College joined the Northeast Conference from Division II Northeast-10 Conference. They are not eligible for the NEC tournament until the 2026–27 season when their four-year reclassification period ends.

Bryant left the conference and joined the America East Conference.

Mount St. Mary's left the conference and joined the Metro Atlantic Athletic Conference (MAAC).

== Head coaches ==
Team	Head coach	Previous position	Year at school	Overall record	NEC record	NEC tournament championships
Central Connecticut	Kerri Reaves	Central Connecticut (assistant)	3rd	8–30	7–24	0
Fairleigh Dickinson	Angelika Szumilo	Fordham (assistant)	4th	48–37	36–18	0
LIU	Rene Haynes	Duke (assistant)	4th	24–51	23–31	
Merrimack	Kelly Morrone	John Carroll	4th	33–36	25–26	
Sacred Heart	Jessica Mannetti	Hofstra	10th	127–133	95–65	
St. Francis Brooklyn	Linda Cimino	Binghamton	5th	47–54	33–33	
Saint Francis (PA)	Keila Whittington	Marist (assistant)	4th	33–50	29–23	
Stonehill	Trisha Brown	Harvard (assistant)	22nd	403–185	0–0	0
Wagner	Terrell Coburn	Wagner (assistant)	2nd	17–12	10–8	

Notes:

- All records, appearances, titles, etc. are from time with current school only.
- Year at school includes 2022–23 season.
- Overall and NEC/NCAA records are from time at current school and are before the beginning of the 2022–23 season.
- Previous jobs are head coaching jobs unless otherwise noted.

== Preseason ==
=== Preseason coaches poll ===
Rank	Team
1.	
2.	
3.	
4.	
5.	
6.	
7.	
8.	
9.	

() first place votes

=== Preseason All-NEC team ===
Recipient	School

== NEC regular season ==
=== Records against other conferences ===
2022–23 records against non-conference foes as of (November 28, 2022):

Regular season

Power 7 Conferences	Record
American	0–0
ACC	0–1
Big East	0–6
Big Ten	0–2
Big 12	0–0
Pac-12	0–0
SEC	0–0
Power 7 Conferences Total	0–9
Other NCAA Division 1 Conferences	Record
America East	0–6
A-10	1–4
ASUN	0–1
Big Sky	0–0
Big South	0–0
Big West	0–2
CAA	1–2
C-USA	0–1
Horizon	0–3
Independent	3–0
Ivy League	1–5
MAAC	2–5
MAC	1–1
MEAC	2–1
MVC	1–0
Mountain West	0–0
OVC	0–0
Patriot League	2–3
SoCon	0–0
Southland	0–0
SWAC	0–0
Summit League	0–0
Sun Belt	0–0
WAC	0–0
WCC	0–0
Other Division I Total	14–34
Division II Total	0–0
Division III Total	1–0
NCAA Division I Total	14–43

Post Season

Power 7 Conferences	Record
American	0–0
ACC	0–0
Big East	0–0
Big Ten	0–0
Big 12	0–0
Pac-12	0–0
SEC	0–0
Power 7 Conferences Total	0–0
Other NCAA Division 1 Conferences	Record
America East	0–0
A-10	0–0
ASUN	0–0
Big Sky	0–0
Big South	0–0
Big West	0–0
CAA	0–0
C-USA	0–0
Horizon	0–0
Ivy League	0–0
MAAC	0–0
MAC	0–0
MEAC	0–0
MVC	0–0
Mountain West	0–0
OVC	0–0
Patriot League	0–0
SoCon	0–0
Southland	0–0
SWAC	0–0
Summit League	0–0
Sun Belt	0–0
WAC	0–0
WCC	0–0
Other Division I Total	0–0
NCAA Division I Total	0–0

=== Record against ranked non-conference opponents ===
This is a list of games against ranked opponents only (rankings from the AP Poll):

Date	Visitor	Home	Site	Significance	Score	Conference record
Nov 11	Saint Francis (PA)	No. 25 Michigan	Crisler Center ● Ann Arbor, MI	—	L 36–91	0–1
Dec 10	Merrimack	No. 5 Notre Dame	Purcell Pavilion ● Notre Dame, IN	―	L 44–108	0–2

Team rankings are reflective of AP poll when the game was played, not current or final ranking

† denotes game was played on neutral site

=== Conference matrix ===
This table summarizes the head-to-head results between teams in conference play.

	CCSU	FDU	LIU	Merrimack	Sacred Heart	SFBK	SFU	Stonehill	Wagner
vs. Central Conn.	–	0–0	0–0	0–0	0–0	0–0	0–0	0-0	0–0
vs. Fairleigh Dickinson	0–0	–	0–0	0-0	0–0	0–0	0–0	0–0	0–0
vs. LIU	0–0	0–0	–	0-0	0–0	0–0	0–0	0–0	0–0
vs. Merrimack	0–0	0–0	0–0	–	0-0	0–0	0–0	0–0	0–0
vs. Sacred Heart	0–0	0–0	0–0	0–0	–	0–0	0-0	0–0	0–0
vs. St. Francis Brooklyn	0–0	0–0	0–0	0–0	0–0	–	0-0	0–0	0–0
vs. Saint Francis (PA)	0–0	0–0	0–0	0–0	0–0	0–0	–	0-0	0–0
vs. Stonehill	0–0	0–0	0–0	0–0	0–0	0–0	0–0	–	0-0
vs. Wagner	0–0	0–0	0–0	0–0	0–0	0–0	0–0	0–0	–
Total	0–0	0–0	0–0	0–0	0–0	0–0	0–0	0–0	0–0

=== Players of the Week ===
Throughout the conference regular season, the Northeast Conference offices named two (Player and Freshman) players of the week each Monday.

Week	Player of the Week	School	Ref.	Freshman of the Week	School	Ref.
Nov. 14	Alyssa Fisher	St. Francis Brooklyn		Ella Fajardo Ny’Ceara Pryor	Fairleigh Dickinson Sacred Heart	
Nov. 21	Chloe Wilson	Fairleigh Dickinson		Ny’Ceara Pryor (2)	Sacred Heart	
Nov. 28	Chloe Wilson (2)	Fairleigh Dickinson		Ny’Ceara Pryor (3)	Sacred Heart	
Dec 5.						
Dec 12.						
Dec 19.						
Dec 26.						
Jan. 2						
Jan 9.						
Jan 16.						
Jan 23.						
Jan. 30						
Feb. 6						
Feb. 13						
Feb. 20						
Feb. 28						

School	PoW	FoW	Total
Fairleigh Dickinson	2	1	3
Sacred Heart	―	3	3
St. Francis Brooklyn	1	―	1

=== All-NEC honors and awards ===
At the conclusion of the regular season, the conference selects outstanding performers based on a poll of league coaches, below are the results.

Honor	Recipient
Player of the Year	
Coach of the Year	
Defensive Player of the Year	
Rookie of the Year	
Most Improved Player of the Year	
All-NEC First Team	
All-NEC Second Team	
All-NEC Third Team	
All-NEC Rookie Team	

== Postseason ==
=== NCAA tournament ===
Seed	Region	School	First Four	1st round	2nd round	Sweet 16	Elite Eight	Final Four	Championship

== See also ==
- 2022–23 Northeast Conference men's basketball season
