= 2022–23 Iona Gaels women's basketball team =

American college basketball season

2022–23 Iona Gaels women's basketball
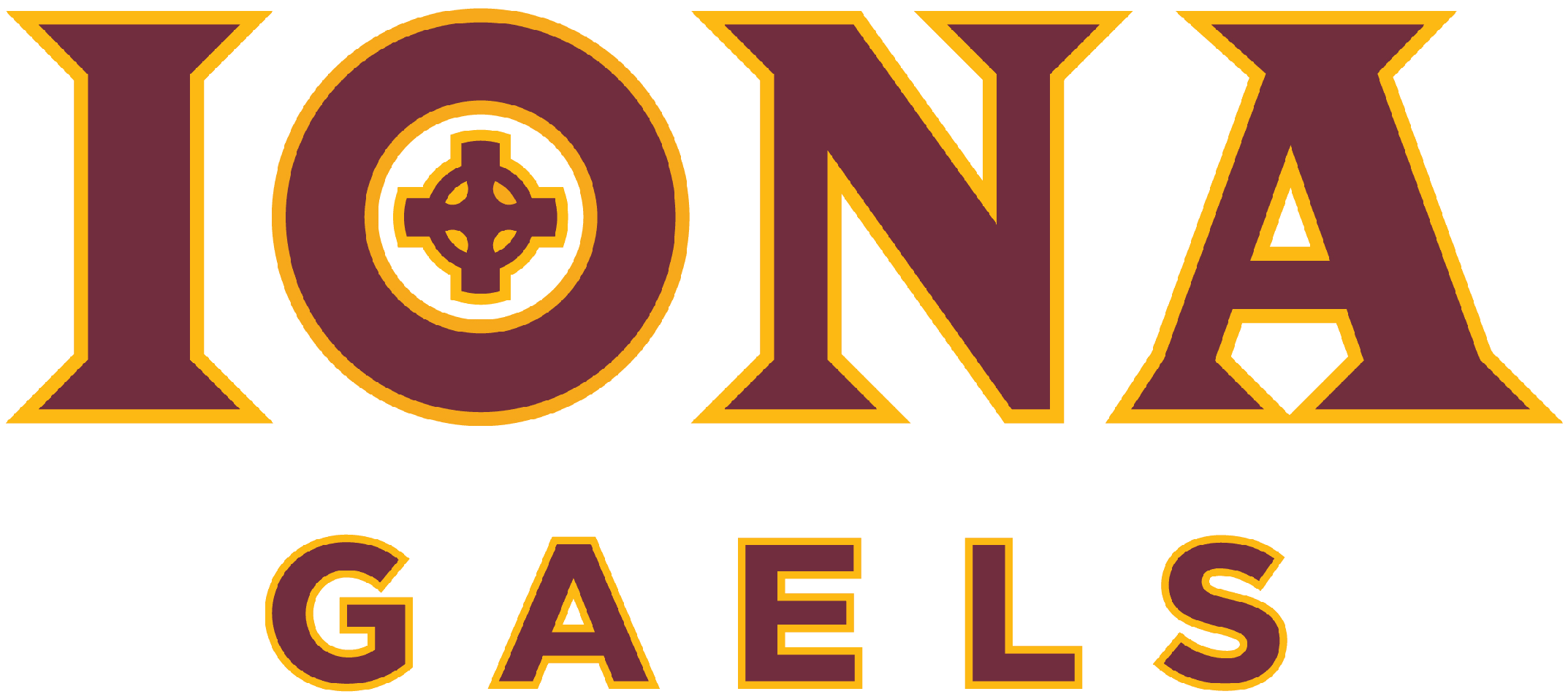

MAAC regular season and MAAC tournament Champions

NCAA tournament, First Round
- Conference: Metro Atlantic Athletic Conference
- Record: 26–7 (18–2 MAAC)
- Head coach: Billi Chambers (10th season)
- Associate head coach: Ashlee Kelly
- Assistant coaches: Nick Volchok; Brianna Sanders
- Home arena: Hynes Athletic Center

2022–23 MAAC women's basketball standings
	Conf.				Overall
Team	W		L	PCT	W		L	PCT
Iona†	18	–	2	.900	26	–	6	.813
Quinnipiac	16	–	4	.800	21	–	9	.700
Niagara	16	–	4	.800	18	–	13	.581
Siena	12	–	8	.600	19	–	13	.594
Fairfield	11	–	9	.550	15	–	15	.500
Manhattan	10	–	10	.500	16	–	17	.485
Marist	8	–	12	.400	12	–	18	.400
Mount St. Mary's	7	–	13	.350	12	–	19	.387
Canisius	6	–	14	.300	9	–	21	.300
Rider	6	–	14	.300	10	–	21	.323
Saint Peter's	0	–	20	.000	0	–	30	.000
† 2023 MAAC tournament winner As of March 17, 2023

The 2022–23 Iona Gaels women's basketball team represented Iona College in the 2022–23 NCAA Division I women's basketball season. The Gaels, led by tenth-year head coach Billi Chambers, played their home games at Hynes Athletic Center, are members of the Metro Atlantic Athletic Conference (MAAC).

== Previous season ==
The Gaels finished the 2021–22 season 11–16, 8–12 in MAAC play to finish in eighth place. As an 8th seed in the MAAC they defeated Rider in the first round before losing to Fairfield in the quarterfinals.

== Roster ==
2022–23 Iona Gaels women's basketball team
Players
Coaches

Pos.	#	Name	Height	Year	Previous school	Hometown
G	1	Natalia Otkhmezuri	5 ft 8 in (1.73 m)	Sr	Southern Utah	Tbilisi, Georgia
F	2	Petra Oborilova	6 ft 2 in (1.88 m)	Fr	Stredná Športová Škola Banská Bystrica	Banská Bystrica, Slovakia
G	3	Addy Salzer	5 ft 11 in (1.8 m)	So	Waconia	Saint Bonifacius, MN
G	4	Ale Civera	5 ft 10 in (1.78 m)	Fr	IES Ortega y Gassett	Madrid, Spain
G	5	Thoranna Hodge-Carr	5 ft 8 in (1.73 m)	So	Fjölbrautaskóli Suðurnesja	Keflavík, Iceland
F	11	Isabelle Lipinski	6 ft 2 in (1.88 m)	Sr	Farmington; Franklin Pierce	Farmington, CT
G	15	Kate Mager	5 ft 9 in (1.75 m)	Sr	Albertus Magnus; Merrimack	New City, NY
G	21	Amaya B. Evans	5 ft 4 in (1.63 m)	Fr	Neptune	Neptune, NJ
G	22	Juana Camilión	5 ft 10 in (1.78 m)	Sr	IES Antoni Maura	Palma de Mallorca, Spain
G	24	Aizhanique Mayo	5 ft 9 in (1.75 m)	Fr	Notre Dame; Marquette	Bridgeport, CT
F/C	30	Ketsia Athias	6 ft 2 in (1.88 m)	Sr	James Madison; NYIT	Brooklyn, NY
G	32	Judith Gomez	5 ft 9 in (1.75 m)	So	Institut Francesc Macià	Barcelona, Spain
G	34	Marina Cenis	5 ft 7 in (1.7 m)	So	Colegio San Agustín Zaragoza	Zaragoza, Spain
G	35	Noa Givon	5 ft 10 in (1.78 m)	Fr	Ostrovski	Ra'anana, Israel

Head coach

- Billi Chambers (Hofstra)

Assistant coach(es)

- Ashlee Kelly (Quinnipiac)
- Nick Volchok (Mercy College)
- Brianna Sanders (Ohio State)

Legend

- (C) Team captain
- (S) Suspended
- (I) Ineligible
- (W) Walk-on
- Injured
- Current redshirt

Roster

== Schedule and results ==
Date time, TV	Rank^{#}	Opponent^{#}	Result	Record	Site (attendance) city, state
Non-conference regular season
November 10, 2022*; 7:00 p.m., ESPN+		Wagner	W 87–62	1–0	Hynes Athletic Center (1,285); New Rochelle, NY
November 14, 2022*; 6:30 p.m., FloSports		at Stony Brook	L 61–63	1–1	Island Federal Arena (612); Stony Brook, NY
November 17, 2022*; 7:00 p.m., ESPN+		Providence	L 50–53	1–2	Hynes Athletic Center (913); New Rochelle, NY
November 20, 2022*; 12:00 p.m., NEC Front Now		at Sacred Heart	W 65–56	2–2	William H. Pitt Center (493); Fairfield, CT
November 22, 2022*; 11:00 a.m., ESPN+		at Bucknell	L 52–55	2–3	Sojka Pavilion (1,024); Lewisburg, PA
November 30, 2022*; 7:00 p.m., ESPN+		Hofstra	W 62–46	3–3	Hynes Athletic Center (877); New Rochelle, NY
December 5, 2022*; 4:00 p.m., NEC Front Row		at LIU	W 64–55	4–3	Steinberg Wellness Center (212); Brooklyn, NY
December 8, 2022*; 7:00 p.m., FloSports		at St. John's	L 51–77	4–4	Carnesecca Arena (334); Queens, NY
December 13, 2022*; 1:00 p.m., ESPN+		Bethune–Cookman	W 60–57	5–4	Hynes Athletic Center (743); New Rochelle, NY
MAAC regular season
December 17, 2022; 1:00 p.m., ESPN3		Quinnipiac	W 57–54	6–4 (1–0)	Hynes Athletic Center (934); New Rochelle, NY
December 19, 2022; 7:00 p.m., ESPN3		at Fairfield	L 43–49	6–5 (1–1)	Leo D. Mahoney Arena (369); Fairfield, CT
December 31, 2022; 2:00 p.m., ESPN+		at Marist	W 76–55	7–5 (2–1)	McCann Arena (802); Poughkeepsie, NY
January 2, 2023; 1:00 p.m., ESPN3		Niagara	W 63–53	8–5 (3–1)	Hynes Athletics Center (1,171); New Rochelle, NY
January 5, 2023; 7:00 p.m., ESPN+		at Rider	W 68–44	9–5 (4–1)	Alumni Gymnasium (479); Lawrenceville, NJ
January 12, 2023; 7:00 p.m., ESPN3		Mount St. Mary's	W 63–44	10–5 (5–1)	Hynes Athletics Center (841); New Rochelle, NY
January 14, 2023; 2:00 p.m., ESPN+		at Quinnipiac	W 47–42	11–5 (6–1)	M&T Bank Arena (694); Hamden, CT
January 19, 2023; 6:00 p.m., ESPN3		Rider	W 90–62	12–5 (7–1)	Hynes Athletics Center (933); New Rochelle, NY
January 21, 2023; 2:00 p.m., ESPN+		at Siena	W 68–66	13–5 (8–1)	UHY Center (643); Loudonville, NY
January 26, 2023; 7:00 p.m., ESPN3		Saint Peter's	W 65–37	14–5 (9–1)	Hynes Athletics Center (994); New Rochelle, NY
January 28, 2023; 1:00 p.m., ESPN3		Manhattan	W 63–49	15–5 (10–1)	Hynes Athletics Center (1,272); New Rochelle, NY
February 2, 2023; 6:00 p.m., ESPN+		at Niagara	W 61–54	16–5 (11–1)	Gallagher Center (474); Lewiston, NY
February 4, 2023; 1:00 p.m., ESPN3		at Canisius	W 68–58	17–5 (12–1)	Koessler Athletic Center (676); Buffalo, NY
February 9, 2023; 7:00 p.m., ESPN+		Fairfield	W 66–55	18–5 (13–1)	Hynes Athletics Center (676); New Rochelle, NY
February 16, 2023; 11:00 a.m., ESPN3		Siena	W 91–64	19–5 (14–1)	Hynes Athletics Center (2,543); New Rochelle, NY
February 18, 2023; 1:00 p.m., ESPN3		at Mount St. Mary's	W 50–37	20–5 (15–1)	Knott Arena (386); Emmitsburg, MD
February 23, 2023; 7:00 p.m., ESPN+		at Manhattan	W 59–53	21–5 (16–1)	Draddy Gymnasium (382); Riverdale, NY
February 23, 2023; 7:00 p.m., ESPN3		Canisius	W 67–43	22–5 (17–1)	Hynes Athletics Center (1,246); New Rochelle, NY
March 2, 2023; 4:30 p.m., ESPN3		Marist	L 60–70	22–6 (17–2)	Hynes Athletics Center (1,160); New Rochelle, NY
March 4, 2023; 7:00 p.m., ESPN+		at Saint Peter's	W 64–56	23–6 (18–2)	Run Baby Run Arena (272); Jersey City, NJ
MAAC women's tournament
March 8, 2023; 1:00 p.m., ESPN+	(1)	vs. (8) Mount St. Mary's; Quarterfinals	W 39–37	24–6	Boardwalk Hall; Atlantic City, NJ
March 10, 2023; 11:00 a.m., ESPN+	(1)	vs. (4) Siena; Semifinals	W 67–66	25–6	Boardwalk Hall; Atlantic City, NJ
March 11, 2023; 3:30 p.m., ESPNU	(1)	vs. (6) Manhattan; Championship Game	W 73–60	26–6	Boardwalk Hall; Atlantic City, NJ
NCAA Women's Tournament
March 16, 2023*; 7:00 p.m., ESPN2	(14 S4)	at (3 S4) No. 13 Duke; First Round	L 49–89	26–7	Cameron Indoor Stadium (2,246); Durham, NC
*Non-conference game. ^{#}Rankings from AP Poll. (#) Tournament seedings in parentheses. S4=Seattle 4. All times are in Eastern.

== See also ==
- 2022–23 Iona Gaels men's basketball team
