= Xavier Musketeers women's basketball =

Xavier Musketeers Women's Basketball
2026–27 Xavier Musketeers women's basketball team
- University: Xavier University
- Head coach: Billi Chambers (4th season)
- Location: Cincinnati, Ohio
- Arena: Cintas Center (capacity: 10,250)
- Conference: Big East
- Nickname: Musketeers
- Colors: Navy blue, white, and gray

NCAA Division I tournament Elite Eight
- 2001, 2010
Other NCAA Division I tournament results
Sweet Sixteen	2001, 2010
Appearances	1993, 1999, 2000, 2001, 2003, 2007, 2008, 2009, 2010, 2011

Conference tournament champions
- Midwestern Collegiate Conference; 1993 Atlantic 10 Conference; 2000, 2001, 2007, 2008, 2010, 2011

Conference regular-season champions
- Midwestern Collegiate Conference; 1992 Atlantic 10 Conference; 2001, 2009, 2010, 2011

The Xavier Musketeers women's basketball team represents Xavier University in Cincinnati, Ohio. The school's team currently competes in the Big East after moving from the Atlantic 10 following the 2012–13 season. The Musketeers are currently coached by Billi Chambers.

== History ==
The Musketeers previously competed in the Midwestern Collegiate Conference after spending the first three years of Division I play in the North Star Conference, beginning in the 1983–1984 season. The women's basketball team began competing in the 1971–72 season under coach Tony Brueneman and had their first winning season two years later, obtaining a 7–6 record.

== Year by year results ==
Record table
Season	Coach	Overall	Conference	Standing	Postseason
Tony Brueneman (1971–1976)
1971–72	Tony Brueneman	1–6			
1972–73	Tony Brueneman	3–3			
1973–74	Tony Brueneman	7–6			
1974–75	Tony Brueneman	9–1			
1975–76	Tony Brueneman	13–2			
Tony Brueneman:		33–18 (.647)			
Laurie Massa (1976–1986)
1976–77	Laurie Massa	7–6			
1977–78	Laurie Massa	6–7			
1978–79	Laurie Massa	14–9			
1979–80	Laurie Massa	8–16			
1980–81	Laurie Massa	15–14			
1981–82	Laurie Massa	20–14			AIAW
1982–83	Laurie Massa	13–13			
North Star Conference (1983–1986)
1983–84	Laurie Massa	10–16	3–7	5th	
1984–85	Laurie Massa	3–25	1–13	6th	
1985–86	Laurie Massa	2–26	2–12	6th	
Laurie Massa:		98–146 (.402)	6–32 (.158)		
North Star Conference:			6–32 (.158)		
Mark Ehlen (1986–1995)
Midwestern Collegiate Conference (1986–1995)
1986–87	Mark Ehlen	6–22	3–9	T-5th	
1987–88	Mark Ehlen	5–22	2–8	T-5th	
1988–89	Mark Ehlen	10–17	6–8	T-5th	
1989–90	Mark Ehlen	13–14	7–9	T-5th	
1990–91	Mark Ehlen	14–13	7–9	7th	
1991–92	Mark Ehlen	19–10	9–3	1st	
1992–93	Mark Ehlen	21–9	11–5	2nd	NCAA Round of 48
1993–94	Mark Ehlen	20–9	8–4	2nd	
1994–95	Mark Ehlen	14–14	7–9	8th	
Mark Ehlen:		122–130 (.484)	60–64 (.484)		
Midwestern Collegiate Conference:			60–64 (.484)		
Melanie Balcomb (1995–2002)
Atlantic 10 Conference (1995–2013)
1995–96	Melanie Balcomb	15–13	7–9	8th (5th West)	
1996–97	Melanie Balcomb	10–17	5–11	8th (5th West)	
1997–98	Melanie Balcomb	17–12	11–5	T-2nd (2nd West)	WNIT 1st Round
1998–99	Melanie Balcomb	24–9	11–5	T-4th (3rd West)	NCAA Round of 32
1999–00	Melanie Balcomb	26–5	13–3	3rd (T-2nd West)	NCAA Round of 64
2000–01	Melanie Balcomb	31–3	15–1	1st	NCAA Elite Eight
2001–02	Melanie Balcomb	12–19	5–11	10th (5th West)	
Melanie Balcomb:		135–78 (.634)	67–45 (.598)		
Kevin McGuff (2002–2011)
2002–03	Kevin McGuff	20–10	11–5	3rd (2nd West)	NCAA Round of 64
2003–04	Kevin McGuff	17–13	8–8	T-6th (4th West)	WNIT 1st Round
2004–05	Kevin McGuff	22–10	13–3	T-2nd (1st West)	WNIT Quarterfinals
2005–06	Kevin McGuff	21–9	11–5	4th	WNIT Round of 16
2006–07	Kevin McGuff	26–8	11–3	3rd	NCAA Round of 64
2007–08	Kevin McGuff	24–9	11–3	3rd	NCAA Round of 64
2008–09	Kevin McGuff	25–7	13–1	1st	NCAA Round of 64
2009–10	Kevin McGuff	30–4	14–0	1st	NCAA Elite Eight
2010–11	Kevin McGuff	29–3	14–0	1st	NCAA Round of 32
Kevin McGuff:		214–73 (.746)	106–28 (.791)		
Amy Waugh (2011–2013)
2011–12	Amy Waugh	8–20	5–9	8th	
2012–13	Amy Waugh	13–16	7–7	T-7th	
Amy Waugh:		21–36 (.368)	12–16 (.429)		
Atlantic 10:			185–89 (.675)		
Big East Conference (2013–present)
Brian Neal (2013–2019)
2013–14	Brian Neal	8–23	3–15	9th	
2014–15	Brian Neal	18–14	8–10	7th	WBI Quarterfinals
2015–16	Brian Neal	17–13	8–10	T-7th	
2016–17	Brian Neal	12–18	4–14	T-7th	
2017–18	Brian Neal	10–20	3–15	T-9th	
2018–19	Brian Neal	11–19	2–16	10th	
Brian Neal:		76–107 (.415)	28–80 (.259)		
Melanie Moore (2019–2023)
2019–20	Melanie Moore	3–27	2–16	T-9th	
2020–21	Melanie Moore	5–10	2–8	9th	
2021–22	Melanie Moore	9–21	4–16	10th	
2022–23	Melanie Moore	7-23	0-20	11th	
Melanie Moore:		24–81 (.229)	8–60 (.118)		
Billi Chambers (2023–Present)
2023–24	Billi Chambers	1-27	0-18	11th	
2024–25	Billi Chambers	7-24	1-17	11th	
Billi Chambers:		8–51 (.136)	1–35 (.028)		
Big East:			37–175 (.175)		
Total:		731–720 (.504)			
National champion Postseason invitational champion Conference regular season champion Conference regular season and conference tournament champion Division regular season champion Division regular season and conference tournament champion Conference tournament champion

== NCAA tournament results ==
Xavier has appeared in the NCAA Division I women's basketball tournament ten times. They have a record of 8–10.

Year	Seed	Round	Opponent	Result
1993	#12	First Round	#5 Clemson	L 64–70
1999	#8	First Round; Second Round	#9 FIU #1 Connecticut	W 85–71; L 84–86
2000	#6	First Round	#11 Stephen F. Austin	L 72–73
2001	#4	First Round; Second Round; Sweet Sixteen; Elite Eight	#13 Louisville #5 Clemson #1 Tennessee #3 Purdue	W 80–52; W 77–62; W 80–65; L 78–88
2003	#10	First Round	#7 UC Santa Barbara	L 62–71
2007	#6	First Round	#11 West Virginia	L 52–65
2008	#9	First Round	#8 Nebraska	L 58–61
2009	#5	First Round	#12 Gonzaga	L 59–74
2010	#3	First Round; Second Round; Sweet Sixteen; Elite Eight	#14 ETSU #6 Vanderbilt #7 Gonzaga #1 Stanford	W 94–82; W 63–62; W 74–56; L 53–55
2011	#2	First Round; Second Round	#15 South Dakota State #7 Louisville	W 72–56; L 75–85

== Retired numbers ==
Xavier Musketeers retired numbers
No.	Player	Position	Career	Year of Retirement
11	Amber Harris	F	2006-11	2025
32	Jo Ann Osterkamp	G	1980-84	2002
33	Tara Boothe	F	2002-06	2009
53	Ta'Shia Phillips	C	2007-11	2025

== Roster ==
2026–27 Xavier Musketeers women's basketball team
Players
Coaches

Pos.	#	Name	Height	Year	Previous school	Hometown
G	1	Payton Richards	5 ft 4 in (1.63 m)	So	Lake Travis	Austin, TX
G	2	Lucile Jermoe	5 ft 9 in (1.75 m)	Fr	Flammes Carolo Basket	Amiens, France
F	3	Maria Anais Rodriguez	6 ft 1 in (1.85 m)	Jr	Arkansas	Barcelona, Spain
G/F	5	Kodee Williams-Sefo	6 ft 1 in (1.85 m)	RS Fr	Westlake Girls	Auckland, New Zealand
G	6	Stella Mavuanga	5 ft 6 in (1.68 m)	Fr	Saint-Amand	Chelles, France
G	7	Kejia Ran	6 ft 0 in (1.83 m)	Fr		Dazhou, China
G	8	Meri Kanerva	5 ft 9 in (1.75 m)	Jr	Mäkelänrinne	Espoo, Finland
G/F	9	Marta Moscarella	6 ft 2 in (1.88 m)	Fr	Limonta Costa Masnaga	Santa Marta, Colombia
G/F	10	Denise Neves	6 ft 0 in (1.83 m)	So		Lisbon, Portugal
G/F	15	Morgan Jenkins	6 ft 2 in (1.88 m)	Fr	The Newman School	Higganum, CT
G	24	Hila Karsh	5 ft 8 in (1.73 m)	So	Purdue	Rishon LeZion, Israel
F	25	Diawna Carter-Hartley	6 ft 1 in (1.85 m)	Sr	South Alabama	Cincinnati, Ohio
F	44	Mya Moore	6 ft 2 in (1.88 m)	Sr	Milwaukee, WIhigh_school=Cleveland State

Head coach

- Billi Chambers (Hofstra)

Assistant coach(es)

- Ashlee Kelly (Quinnipiac)
- Brianna Sanders (Ohio State)
- Ari Wideman (Nevada)

Legend

- (C) Team captain
- (S) Suspended
- (I) Ineligible
- (W) Walk-on
- Injured
- Current redshirt

Roster
Last update: September 12, 2026
