= 2022–23 LIU Sharks women's basketball team =

Intercollegiate basketball season

2022–23 LIU Sharks women's basketball
- Conference: Northeast Conference
- Record: 7–22 (5–11 NEC)
- Head coach: Rene Haynes (4th season)
- Associate head coach: Chris Dunn
- Assistant coaches: Aurielle Richards Anderson; Steven Gilbert
- Home arena: Steinberg Wellness Center

2022–23 Northeast Conference women's basketball standings
	Conf.				Overall
Team	W		L	PCT	W		L	PCT
Fairleigh Dickinson	14	–	2	.875	24	–	8	.750
Sacred Heart†	12	–	4	.750	19	–	14	.576
Merrimack*	10	–	6	.625	15	–	16	.484
St. Francis Brooklyn	9	–	7	.563	11	–	19	.367
Wagner	8	–	8	.500	13	–	15	.464
Saint Francis (PA)	6	–	10	.375	7	–	22	.241
Stonehill*	5	–	11	.313	9	–	20	.310
LIU	5	–	11	.313	7	–	22	.241
Central Connecticut	3	–	13	.188	7	–	22	.241
† 2023 NEC tournament winner * ineligible for the 2023 NCAA tournament due to transition period As of March 17, 2023

The 2022–23 LIU Sharks women's basketball team represented Long Island University (LIU) during the 2022–23 NCAA Division I women's basketball season. They were led by fourth-year head coach Rene Haynes and played their home games at Steinberg Wellness Center in Brooklyn, New York as members of the Northeast Conference (NEC).

The Sharks finished the season 7–22, 5–11 in NEC play, to finish in a tie for seventh place. They lost in the quarterfinals of the Northeast Conference tournament to Sacred Heart.

== Roster ==
2022–23 LIU Sharks women's basketball team
Players
Coaches

Pos.	#	Name	Height	Year	Previous school	Hometown
F	0	De'Asia Thomas	6 ft 0 in (1.83 m)	Jr	Sapulpa; Kilgore	Tulsa, OK
G	1	Emaia O'Brien	5 ft 1 in (1.55 m)	So	Chandler Park Academy	Detroit, MI
G	2	Zoée Hache	5 ft 6 in (1.68 m)	Jr	Victor Hugo	Normandy, France
G/F	3	Cristina Bermejo	6 ft 0 in (1.83 m)	Sr	IES Sant Just Desvern; South Florida	Sant Just Desvern, Spain
G	4	TaShun Bryson	5 ft 10 in (1.78 m)	So	Mitchell School; Florida SouthWestern State	Memphis, TN
G	5	Shyan Mwai	5 ft 6 in (1.68 m)		Lowell; Iona	Lowell, MA
G	10	Claire Henson	5 ft 10 in (1.78 m)	Fr	Valley View	Germantown, OH
G	11	Mariah Elohim	5 ft 10 in (1.78 m)	Fr	Westlake	Westlake Village, CA
G	12	Ashley Austin	5 ft 6 in (1.68 m)	Jr	Lynwood; Texas Southern	Compton, CA
F	14	Dia Dénes	6 ft 1 in (1.85 m)	So	Szabó lorinc	Budapest, Hungary
G	15	Kayla Tilus	5 ft 11 in (1.8 m)	Fr	Notre Dame Catholic High School	Bridgeport, CT
F	20	Jeanine Brandsma	6 ft 2 in (1.88 m)	Fr	Lycée Ernest Couteaux	Éguzon-Chantôme, France
G	21	Tiana Amos	5 ft 7 in (1.7 m)		South Oak Cliff	Dallas, TX
G	22	Iris Mbulito	6 ft 0 in (1.83 m)		IES Tomás Morales Castellano; Arizona State	Las Palmas, Spain
G/F	24	Antoaneta Alexe	5 ft 11 in (1.8 m)	Jr	IMG Academy; Winthrop	Bucharest, Romania
C	33	Sydni Smith	6 ft 2 in (1.88 m)	Fr	Union	Tulsa, OK

Head coach

- Rene Haynes (Michigan State)

Assistant coach(es)

- Chris Dunn (West Virginia State)
- Aurielle Richards Anderson (Western Michigan)
- Steven Gilbert (Webber International)

Legend

- (C) Team captain
- (S) Suspended
- (I) Ineligible
- (W) Walk-on
- Injured
- Current redshirt

Roster
Last update: November 27, 2023

== Schedule ==
Date time, TV	Rank^{#}	Opponent^{#}	Result	Record	Site (attendance) city, state
Non-conference regular season
November 7, 2022*; 7:00 p.m., ESPN3		at Ohio	W 74–67	1–0	Convocation Center (955); Athens, OH
November 9, 2022*; 8:00 p.m., BTN+		at Illinois	L 40–75	1–1	State Farm Center (1,583); Champaign, IL
November 12, 2022*; 2:00 p.m.		at Hartford	W 70–54	2–1	Chase Arena (227); West Hartford, CT
November 17, 2022*; 7:00 p.m., ACCNX		at Syracuse	L 63–85	2–2	JMA Wireless Dome (1,084); Syracuse, NY
November 22, 2022*; 7:00 p.m., NEC Front Row		NJIT	L 50–57	2–3	Steinberg Wellness Center (168); Brooklyn, NY
November 25, 2022*; 5:00 p.m., ESPN+		at UC Irvine	L 56–65	2–4	Bren Events Center (579); Irvine, CA
November 26, 2022*; 5:00 p.m., ESPN+		at UC Riverside	L 47–49	2–5	UC Riverside Student Recreation Center (104); Riverside, CA
December 3, 2022*; 2:00 p.m., FloHoops		at Hofstra	L 71–74	2–6	David S. Mack Sports and Exhibition Complex (244); Hempstead, NY
December 5, 2022*; 4:00 p.m., NEC Front Row		Iona	L 55–64	2–7	Steinberg Wellness Center (212); Brooklyn, NY
December 10, 2022*; 2:00 p.m., ESPN+		at Buffalo	L 59–91	2–8	Alumni Arena (1,647); Buffalo, NY
December 13, 2022*; 7:00 p.m., NEC Front Row		Columbia	L 47–90	2–9	Steinberg Wellness Center (120); Brooklyn, NY
December 14, 2022*; 6:00 p.m.		at Queens	Canceled		Curry Arena; Charlotte, NC
December 22, 2022*; 2:00 p.m., ESPN+		at Manhattan	L 47–73	2–10	Draddy Gymnasium (134); New York City, NY
Northeast Conference regular season
January 2, 2023; 7:00 p.m., NEC Front Row		FDU	L 51–88	2–11 (0–1)	Steinberg Wellness Center (125); Brooklyn, NY
January 6, 2023; 7:00 p.m.		at Sacred Heart	L 53–63	2–12 (0–2)	William H. Pitt Center (343); Fairfield, CT
January 8, 2023; 3:00 p.m., NEC Front Row		at Wagner	L 63–80	2–13 (0–3)	Spiro Sports Center (317); Staten Island, NY
January 14, 2023; 2:00 p.m., NEC Front Row		Saint Francis	L 51–62	2–14 (0–4)	Steinberg Wellness Center (145); Brooklyn, NY
January 16, 2023; 2:00 p.m., NEC Front Row		at St. Francis Brooklyn	L 60–66	2–15 (0–5)	Generoso Pope Athletic Complex (91); Brooklyn, NY
January 19, 2023; 7:00 p.m., NEC Front Row		Central Connecticut	L 43–60	2–16 (0–6)	Steinberg Wellness Center (112); Brooklyn, NY
January 21, 2023; 2:00 p.m., NEC Front Row		at Stonehill	L 49–56	2–17 (0–7)	Merkert Gymnasium (426); Easton, MA
January 26, 2023; 7:00 p.m., NEC Front Row		Sacred Heart	L 58–70	2–18 (0–8)	Steinberg Wellness Center (183); Brooklyn, NY
January 28, 2023; 2:00 p.m., ESPN3/SNY		St. Francis Brooklyn	W 69–54	3–18 (1–8)	Steinberg Wellness Center (312); Brooklyn, NY
February 2, 2023; 12:00 p.m., NEC Front Row		Merrimack	L 39–61	3–19 (1–9)	Steinberg Wellness Center (120); Brooklyn, NY
February 9, 2023; 7:00 p.m., NEC Front Row		at FDU	L 53–69	3–20 (1–10)	Rothman Center (318); Teaneck, NJ
February 11, 2023; 2:00 p.m., NEC Front Row		Wagner	W 78–68	4–20 (2–10)	Steinberg Wellness Center (145); Brooklyn, NY
February 16, 2023; 7:00 p.m., NEC Front Row		Stonehill	W 78–72	5–20 (3–10)	Steinberg Wellness Center (112); Brooklyn, NY
February 18, 2023; 7:00 p.m., NEC Front Row		at Saint Francis	L 58–61	5–21 (3–11)	DeGol Arena (1,020); Loretto, PA
February 25, 2023; 3:00 p.m., NEC Front Row		at Merrimack	W 58–54	6–21 (4–11)	Hammel Court (307); North Andover, MA
March 2, 2023; 7:00 p.m., NEC Front Row		at Central Connecticut	W 59–57	7–21 (5–11)	William H. Detrick Gymnasium (509); New Britain, CT
Northeast Conference women's tournament
March 6, 2023; 7:00 p.m., SNY/ESPN3	(7)	(2) Sacred Heart; Quarterfinals	L 44–63	6–22	William H. Pitt Center (155); Fairfield, CT
*Non-conference game. ^{#}Rankings from AP poll. (#) Tournament seedings in parentheses. All times are in Eastern.
