= 2022–23 Sacred Heart Pioneers women's basketball team =

Intercollegiate basketball season

2022–23 Sacred Heart Pioneers women's basketball

NEC tournament champions

NCAA tournament, first round
- Conference: Northeast Conference
- Record: 19–14 (12–4 NEC)
- Head coach: Jessica Mannetti (10th season)
- Assistant coaches: Candice Leatherwood; Liz Flooks
- Home arena: William H. Pitt Center

2022–23 Northeast Conference women's basketball standings
	Conf.				Overall
Team	W		L	PCT	W		L	PCT
Fairleigh Dickinson	14	–	2	.875	24	–	8	.750
Sacred Heart†	12	–	4	.750	19	–	14	.576
Merrimack*	10	–	6	.625	15	–	16	.484
St. Francis Brooklyn	9	–	7	.563	11	–	19	.367
Wagner	8	–	8	.500	13	–	15	.464
Saint Francis (PA)	6	–	10	.375	7	–	22	.241
Stonehill*	5	–	11	.313	9	–	20	.310
LIU	5	–	11	.313	7	–	22	.241
Central Connecticut	3	–	13	.188	7	–	22	.241
† 2023 NEC tournament winner * ineligible for the 2023 NCAA tournament due to transition period As of March 17, 2023

The 2022–23 Sacred Heart Pioneers women's basketball team represented Sacred Heart University during the 2022–23 NCAA Division I women's basketball season. The Pioneers, led by tenth-year head coach Jessica Mannetti, played their home games at the William H. Pitt Center in Fairfield, Connecticut as members of the Northeast Conference (NEC).

== Previous season ==
The Pioneers finished the 2021–22 season 10–20, 6–12 in NEC play, to finish in a tie for eighth place. They defeated Central Connecticut in the first round of NEC tournament before losing in the quarterfinals to Fairleigh Dickinson.

== Roster ==
2022–23 Sacred Heart Pioneers women's basketball team
Players
Coaches

Pos.	#	Name	Height	Year	Previous school	Hometown
G	1	Ny'Ceara Pryor	5 ft 3 in (1.6 m)	Fr	Western	Baltimore, MD
G	3	Amelia Wood	6 ft 0 in (1.83 m)	Fr	Averill Park	Wynantskill, NY
G	4	Kennadie Hallum	5 ft 9 in (1.75 m)	So	Sachem North	Lake Grove, NY
G/F	5	Wil'Lisha Jackson	5 ft 8 in (1.73 m)	GS	Rahway/Saint Peter's	Rahway, NJ
G	10	Afia Owusu Mensah	5 ft 8 in (1.73 m)	GS	CMIT Academy North	Glenn Dale, MD
G	12	Maya Klein	5 ft 6 in (1.68 m)	GS	St. Luke's School/Providence	Stamford, CT
F/C	13	Carly Stroemel	6 ft 3 in (1.91 m)	Sr	Paul VI HS	Voorhees, NJ
F	22	Ciara Brannon	6 ft 1 in (1.85 m)	Jr	Westampton Tech/Wagner	Westampton, NJ
G	23	Sajada Bonner	6 ft 0 in (1.83 m)	GS	St. John Vianney/Quinnipiac	Cliffwood, NJ
G	24	Sierra Johnson	5 ft 8 in (1.73 m)	Fr	TPLS Christian Academy	Richmond, VA
G	30	Olivia Tucker	5 ft 8 in (1.73 m)	Sr	Sanford School/St. Bonaventure	Newark, DE
G	33	Savannah Marshall	5 ft 8 in (1.73 m)	Sr	Westbrook	Westbrook, CT
F/C	34	Kelsey Wood	6 ft 1 in (1.85 m)	Jr	Averill Park	Wynantskill, NY

Head coach

- Jessica Mannetti (Concordia College)

Assistant coach(es)

- Candice Leatherwood (Sacred Heart)
- Liz Flooks (Niagara)

Legend

- (C) Team captain
- (S) Suspended
- (I) Ineligible
- (W) Walk-on
- Injured
- Current redshirt

Roster
Last update: March 25, 2023

== Schedule ==
Date time, TV	Rank^{#}	Opponent^{#}	Result	Record	Site (attendance) city, state
Non-conference regular season
November 7, 2022*; 7:00 p.m.		Hartford	W 72–34	1–0	William H. Pitt Center (423); Fairfield, CT
November 10, 2022*; 7:00 p.m.		La Salle	L 48–69	1–1	William H. Pitt Center (583); Fairfield, CT
November 13, 2022*; 4:00 p.m.		Monmouth	L 62–77	1–2	William H. Pitt Center (497); Fairfield, CT
November 16, 2022*; 7:00 p.m.		at Brown	L 35–56	1–3	Pizzitola Sports Center (179); Providence, RI
November 20, 2022*; 12:00 p.m., NEC Front Row		Iona	L 56–65	1–4	William H. Pitt Center (493); Fairfield, CT
November 25, 2022*; 2:00 p.m.		Butler; FAU Thanksgiving Tournament	L 39–64	1–5	Eleanor R. Baldwin Arena (723); Boca Raton, FL
November 26, 2022*; 4:00 p.m.		at FAU; FAU Thanksgiving Tournament	L 66–68	1–6	Eleanor R. Baldwin Arena (768); Boca Raton, FL
December 1, 2022*; 4:00 p.m.		at Army	L 48–50	1–7	Christl Arena (461); West Point, NY
December 7, 2022*; 7:00 p.m.		Bryant	L 56–67	1–8	William H. Pitt Center (503); Fairfield, CT
December 11, 2022*; 7:00 p.m.		at Fairfield	W 69–58	2–8	Leo D. Mahoney Arena (1,311); Fairfield, CT
December 18, 2022*; 2:00 p.m.		Vermont	Cancelled		William H. Pitt Center; Fairfield, CT
December 20, 2022*; 11:00 a.m.		Providence	L 52–64	2–9	William H. Pitt Center (423); Fairfield, CT
December 31, 2022*; 1:00 p.m.		Mercy	W 81–44	3–9	William H. Pitt Center (208); Fairfield, CT
Northeast Conference regular season
January 6, 2023; 7:00 p.m.		LIU	W 63–53	4–9 (1–0)	William H. Pitt Center (343); Fairfield, CT
January 8, 2023; 2:00 p.m.		at Stonehill	W 70–56	5–9 (2–0)	Merkert Gymnasium; Easton, MA
January 14, 2023; 2:00 p.m.		St. Francis Brooklyn	W 76–60	6–9 (3–0)	William H. Pitt Center; Fairfield, CT
January 16, 2023; 6:00 p.m.		at Saint Francis	W 73–60	7–9 (4–0)	DeGol Arena (546); Loretto, PA
January 19, 2023; 7:00 p.m.		Merrimack	L 64–66	7–10 (4–1)	William H. Pitt Center (373); Fairfield, CT
January 21, 2023; 2:00 p.m.		Fairleigh Dickinson	W 71–62	8–10 (5–1)	William H. Pitt Center; Fairfield, CT
January 26, 2023; 7:00 p.m.		at LIU	W 70–58	9–10 (6–1)	Steinberg Wellness Center (183); Brooklyn, NY
January 28, 2023; 2:00 p.m.		Stonehill	W 66–61	10–10 (7–1)	William H. Pitt Center (519); Fairfield, CT
February 2, 2023; 7:00 p.m.		at Wagner	W 65–47	11–10 (8–1)	Spiro Sports Center (518); Staten Island, NY
February 4, 2023; 1:00 p.m.		at Central Connecticut	L 64–79	11–11 (8–2)	William H. Detrick Gymnasium (246); New Britain, CT
February 9, 2023; 7:00 p.m.		Saint Francis	W 68–34	12–11 (9–2)	William H. Pitt Center (613); Fairfield, CT
February 16, 2023; 7:00 p.m.		at Fairleigh Dickinson	W 70–67	13–11 (10–2)	Rothman Center (327); Teaneck, NJ
February 18, 2023; 3:00 p.m.		at Merrimack	L 66–73	13–12 (10–3)	Hammel Court (286); North Andover, MA
February 23, 2023; 7:00 p.m.		at St. Francis Brooklyn	L 55–58	13–13 (10–4)	Generoso Pope Athletic Complex (271); Brooklyn, NY
February 25, 2023; 2:00 p.m., ESPN3		Central Connecticut	W 56–45	14–13 (11–4)	William H. Pitt Center (445); Fairfield, CT
March 2, 2023; 7:00 p.m.		Wagner	W 66–58	15–13 (12–4)	William H. Pitt Center (469); Fairfield, CT
Northeast Conference women's tournament
March 6, 2023; 7:00 p.m., ESPN3	(2)	(7) LIU; Quarterfinals	W 63–44	16–13	William H. Pitt Center (155); Fairfield, CT
March 9, 2023; 7:00 p.m., ESPN3	(2)	(3) Merrimack; Semifinals	W 68–61	17–13	William H. Pitt Center (172); Fairfield, CT
March 12, 2023; 12:00 p.m., ESPNU	(2)	at (1) Fairleigh Dickinson; Championship	W 72–60	18–13	Rothman Center (1,237); Teaneck, NJ
NCAA women's tournament
March 15, 2023*; 9:00 p.m., ESPNU	(16 S4)	vs. (16 S4) Southern; First Four	W 57–47	19–13	Maples Pavilion (314); Stanford, CA
March 17, 2023*; 7:30 p.m., ESPN2	(16 S4)	at (1 S4) No. 5 Stanford; First round	L 49–92	19–14	Maples Pavilion (4,020); Stanford, CA
*Non-conference game. ^{#}Rankings from AP poll. (#) Tournament seedings in parentheses. All times are in Eastern.

== See also ==
- 2022–23 Sacred Heart Pioneers men's basketball team
