= 2022–23 Central Connecticut Blue Devils women's basketball team =

Intercollegiate basketball season

2022–23 Central Connecticut Blue Devils women's basketball
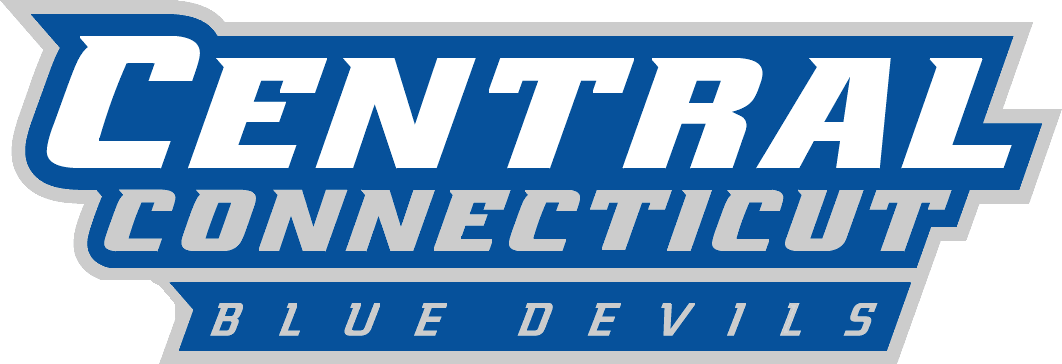
- Conference: Northeast Conference
- Record: 7–22 (3–13 NEC)
- Head coach: Kerri Reeves (3rd season)
- Assistant coaches: Andrew Stephens; Ashley Wilson
- Home arena: William H. Detrick Gymnasium

2022–23 Northeast Conference women's basketball standings
	Conf.				Overall
Team	W		L	PCT	W		L	PCT
Fairleigh Dickinson	14	–	2	.875	24	–	8	.750
Sacred Heart†	12	–	4	.750	19	–	14	.576
Merrimack*	10	–	6	.625	15	–	16	.484
St. Francis Brooklyn	9	–	7	.563	11	–	19	.367
Wagner	8	–	8	.500	13	–	15	.464
Saint Francis (PA)	6	–	10	.375	7	–	22	.241
Stonehill*	5	–	11	.313	9	–	20	.310
LIU	5	–	11	.313	7	–	22	.241
Central Connecticut	3	–	13	.188	7	–	22	.241
† 2023 NEC tournament winner * ineligible for the 2023 NCAA tournament due to transition period As of March 17, 2023

The 2022–23 Central Connecticut Blue Devils women's basketball team represented Central Connecticut State University in the 2022–23 NCAA Division I women's basketball season. The Blue Devils, led by third-year head coach Kerri Reeves, played their home games at the William H. Detrick Gymnasium in New Britain, Connecticut as members of the Northeast Conference (NEC).

The Blue Devils finished the season 7–22, 3–13 in NEC play, to finish in ninth (last) place in the conference. They were defeated by Fairleigh Dickinson in the quarterfinals of the NEC tournament.

== Previous season ==
The Blue Devils finished the 2021–22 season 6–20, 4–12 in NEC play, to finish in eighth place.

== Roster ==
2022–23 Central Connecticut Blue Devils women's basketball team
Players
Coaches

Pos.	#	Name	Height	Year	Hometown
G	1	Forever Toppin	5 ft 8 in (1.73 m)	Sr	Paterson, NJ
G	2	Belle Lanpher	5 ft 5 in (1.65 m)	So	Princeton, MA
G	5	Amaya Williams	5 ft 5 in (1.65 m)	So	Syracuse, NY
G	10	Emma Bruen	5 ft 7 in (1.7 m)	So	Middletown, NJ
G	11	Dejah Jenkins	5 ft 7 in (1.7 m)	Jr	Dorchester, MA
G	12	Ally Sentance	5 ft 9 in (1.75 m)	Fr	Thorold, ON
F	14	Brooke Lechleitner	5 ft 11 in (1.8 m)	Fr	Conrath, WI
G	15	Livvy Pizzitola	5 ft 5 in (1.65 m)	So	Southington, CT
G	21	Ciera Pierson	5 ft 8 in (1.73 m)	Fr	Teaneck, NJ
G	23	Carla Bastada	5 ft 10 in (1.78 m)	Jr	Barcelona, Spain
F/C	24	Lara Rohkohl	6 ft 2 in (1.88 m)	Fr	Hannover, Germany
C	33	Tatiana Brown	6 ft 0 in (1.83 m)	Fr	Virginia Beach, VA
F	32	Meghan Kenefick	6 ft 0 in (1.83 m)	Jr	Oakton, VA
F	34	Alli Napoli	6 ft 0 in (1.83 m)	So	Amesbury, MA

Head coach

- Kerri Reeves (Marquette)

Assistant coach(es)

- Andrew Stephens (Arizona State)
- Ashley Wilson (Wayne State)

Legend

- (C) Team captain
- (S) Suspended
- (I) Ineligible
- (W) Walk-on
- Injured
- Current redshirt

Roster
Last update: November 2, 2022

== Schedule and results ==
Date time, TV	Rank^{#}	Opponent^{#}	Result	Record	Site (attendance) city, state
Non-conference regular season
November 7, 2022*; 5:00 p.m., ESPN+		at UMass	L 57–72	0–1	Mullins Center (1,138); Amherst, MA
November 12, 2022*; 2:00 p.m., ESPN+		at Quinnipiac	L 54–72	0–2	People's United Center (733); Hamden, CT
November 19, 2022*; 1:00 p.m., ESPN3		NJIT	L 65–71 ^{OT}	0–3	Fleisher Center (262); Newark, NJ
November 23, 2022*; 12:00 p.m.		Saint Peter's	W 76–56	1–3	William H. Detrick Gymnasium (228); New Britain, CT
November 28, 2022*; 7:00 p.m.		Brown	L 46–69	1–4	William H. Detrick Gymnasium; New Britain, CT
November 30, 2022*; 7:00 p.m.		New Hampshire	L 45–64	1–5	William H. Detrick Gymnasium; Catonsville, MD
December 3, 2022*; 1:00 p.m.		Bryant	W 58–54	2–5	William H. Detrick Gymnasium; New Britain, CT
December 7, 2022*; 6:00 p.m.		at UMass Lowell	L 47–60	2–6	Costello Athletic Center; Lowell, MA
December 10, 2022*; 1:00 p.m., FloSports		at Providence	L 45–77	2–7	Alumni Hall; Providence, RI
December 18, 2022*; 2:00 p.m.		at Hartford; Rivalry	W 69–55	3–7	Chase Arena at Reich Family Pavilion; West Hartford, CT
December 22, 2022*; 12:00 p.m., ACCNX		at Boston College	L 35–86	3–8	Conte Forum (583); Chestnut Hill, MA
Northeast Conference regular season
January 2, 2023; 4:00 p.m.		Stonehill	L 66–73	3–9 (0–1)	William H. Detrick Gymnasium (189); New Britain, CT
January 6, 2023; 7:00 p.m.		at St. Francis Brooklyn	L 59–65	3–10 (0–2)	Generoso Pope Athletic Complex; Brooklyn, NY
January 8, 2023; 1:00 p.m.		Saint Francis (PA)	W 64–60	4–10 (1–2)	William H. Detrick Gymnasium (150); New Britain, CT
January 14, 2023; 1:00 p.m.		at Fairleigh Dickinson	L 53–59	4–11 (1–3)	Rothman Center (175); Teaneck, NJ
January 19, 2022; 7:00 p.m.		at LIU	W 60–43	5–11 (2–3)	Steinberg Wellness Center (112); Brooklyn, NY
January 21, 2023; 1:00 p.m.		Wagner	L 52–57	5–12 (2–4)	William H. Detrick Gymnasium (326); New Britain, CT
January 26, 2023; 7:00 p.m.		at Merrimack	L 67–69	5–13 (2–5)	Hammel Court (833); North Andover, MA
January 28, 2023; 7:00 p.m.		at Saint Francis (PA)	L 57–63	5–14 (2–6)	DeGol Arena (564); Loretto, PA
February 2, 2023; 7:00 p.m.		St. Francis Brooklyn	L 61–70	5–15 (2–7)	William H. Detrick Gymnasium (207); New Britain, CT
February 4, 2023; 1:00 p.m.		Sacred Heart	W 79–64	6–15 (3–7)	William H. Detrick Gymnasium (246); New Britain, CT
February 8, 2023*; 7:00 p.m.		Hartford	W 72–55	7–15	William H. Detrick Gymnasium (146); New Britain, CT
February 11, 2023; 1:00 p.m.		Fairleigh Dickinson	L 48–81	7–16 (3–8)	William H. Detrick Gymnasium (211); New Britain, CT
February 16, 2023; 7:00 p.m.		at Wagner	L 52–62	7–17 (3–9)	Spiro Sports Center (269); Staten Island, NY
February 18, 2023; 2:00 p.m.		at Stonehill	L 50–61	7–18 (3–10)	Merkert Gymnasium (716); Easton, MA
February 23, 2023; 7:00 p.m.		Merrimack	L 60–62	7–19 (3–11)	William H. Detrick Gymnasium (249); New Britain, CT
February 25, 2023; 2:00 p.m., ESPN3		at Sacred Heart	L 45–56	7–20 (3–12)	William H. Pitt Center (445); Fairfield, CT
March 2, 2023; 7:00 p.m.		LIU	L 57–59	7–21 (3–13)	William H. Detrick Gymnasium (509); New Britain, CT
Northeast Conference tournament
March 6, 2023; 7:00 p.m., NEC Front Row	(8)	at (1) Fairleigh Dickinson; Quarterfinals	L 48–74	7–22	Rothman Center (292); Teaneck, NJ
*Non-conference game. ^{#}Rankings from AP poll. (#) Tournament seedings in parentheses. All times are in Eastern.
