= Sacred Heart Pioneers women's basketball =

Sacred Heart Pioneers
| 2025–26 Sacred Heart Pioneers women's basketball team |
- University: Sacred Heart University
- First season: 1974
- Head coach: Jessica Mannetti (13th season)
- Location: Fairfield, Connecticut
- Arena: William H. Pitt Center (capacity: 2,062)
- Conference: Metro Atlantic Athletic Conference
- Nickname: Pioneers
- Colors: Red and white
- All-time record: 657–655 (.501)

NCAA Division I tournament appearances
- 2006, 2009, 2012, 2023, 2024

Conference tournament champions
- 2006, 2009, 2012, 2023, 2024

Conference regular-season champions
- 2006, 2007, 2009, 2012, 2016, 2024

The Sacred Heart Pioneers women's basketball team represents Sacred Heart University in Fairfield, Connecticut, United States. The school's team competes in the Metro Atlantic Athletic Conference. They play their home games at the William H. Pitt Center.

== History ==
Sacred Heart played in the Northeast Conference. They won the Northeast Conference women's basketball tournament five times. In each of their first three NCAA Division I Tournament appearances, they lost each time in the first round, losing 95–54 to Maryland 77–63 to Ohio State, and 76–50 to Georgia Tech, respectively. They appeared in the WBI in 2011 and the WNIT in 2013 and 2016.

== Season-by-season results ==
| Season | Coach | Overall | Conference | Standing | Postseason |
|---|---|---|---|---|---|
Pedro Tagatac () (1981–1985)
| 1981–82 | Pedro Tagatac | 4–14 | | | |
| 1982–83 | Pedro Tagatac | 0–21 | | | |
| 1983–84 | Pedro Tagatac | 9–16 | | | |
| 1984–85 | Pedro Tagatac | 3–22 | | | |
| Pedro Tagatac: | | 16–73 (.180) | | | |
Margaret Diaz () (1985–1986)
| 1985–86 | Margaret Diaz | 9–16 | | | |
| Margaret Diaz: | | 9–16 (.360) | | | |
Adolph Ellis () (1986–1990)
| 1986–87 | Adolph Ellis | 6–20 | | | |
| 1987–88 | Adolph Ellis | 2–24 | | | |
| 1988–89 | Adolph Ellis | 5–19 | | | |
| 1989–90 | Adolph Ellis | 4–21 | | | |
| Adolph Ellis: | | 17–84 (.168) | | | |
Ed Swanson (NECC) (1990–1999)
| 1990–91 | Ed Swanson | 8–19 | 3–11 | 7th | |
| 1991–92 | Ed Swanson | 11–16 | 5–9 | T5th | |
| 1992–93 | Ed Swanson | 16–13 | 7–7 | 4th | |
| 1993–94 | Ed Swanson | 12–15 | 8–8 | 5th | |
| 1994–95 | Ed Swanson | 11–16 | 7–9 | 5th | |
| 1995–96 | Ed Swanson | 20–7 | 16–4 | T2nd | |
| 1996–97 | Ed Swanson | 14–14 | 10–8 | 5th | |
| 1997–98 | Ed Swanson | 19–7 | 13–3 | 2nd | |
| 1998–99 | Ed Swanson | 15–12 | 12–6 | 3rd | |
Ed Swanson (Northeast Conference) (1999–2013)
| 1999–2000 | Ed Swanson | 14–14 | 11–7 | T3rd | |
| 2000–01 | Ed Swanson | 15–14 | 11–7 | T3rd | |
| 2001–02 | Ed Swanson | 18–11 | 13–5 | T2nd | |
| 2002–03 | Ed Swanson | 18–10 | 12–6 | T3rd | |
| 2003–04 | Ed Swanson | 21–8 | 14–4 | 2nd | |
| 2004–05 | Ed Swanson | 18–11 | 14–4 | 2nd | |
| 2005–06 | Ed Swanson | 26–5 | 16–2 | 1st | |
| 2006–07 | Ed Swanson | 22–10 | 15–3 | T1st | |
| 2007–08 | Ed Swanson | 19–11 | 14–4 | 3rd | |
| 2008–09 | Ed Swanson | 28–5 | 18–0 | 1st | |
| 2009–10 | Ed Swanson | 19–11 | 14–4 | 3rd | |
| 2010–11 | Ed Swanson | 18–13 | 12–6 | T3rd | |
| 2011–12 | Ed Swanson | 25–8 | 15–3 | 1st | |
| 2012–13 | Ed Swanson | 22–11 | 13–5 | 2nd | |
| Ed Swanson: | | 406–264 (.606) | 273–125 (.686) | | |
Jessica Mannetti (Northeast Conference) (2013–present)
| 2013–14 | Jessica Mannetti | 12–18 | 9–9 | 5th | |
| 2014–15 | Jessica Mannetti | 16–13 | 11–7 | 4th | |
| 2015–16 | Jessica Mannetti | 20–13 | 16–2 | 1st | WNIT first round |
| 2016–17 | Jessica Mannetti | 17–15 | 13–5 | T–2nd | WNIT first round |
| 2017–18 | Jessica Mannetti | 14–17 | 9–9 | T–3rd | |
| 2018–19 | Jessica Mannetti | 19–13 | 14–4 | 2nd | WNIT first round |
| 2019–20 | Jessica Mannetti | 12–17 | 9–9 | 5th | |
| 2020–21 | Jessica Mannetti | 8–10 | 8–8 | | |
| 2021–22 | Jessica Mannetti | 8–17 | 6–12 | | |
| 2022–23 | Jessica Mannetti | 19–14 | 12–4 | 2nd | NCAA First Round |
| 2023–24 | Jessica Mannetti | 24–10 | 15–1 | 1st | NCAA First Four |
| Jessica Mannetti: | | 146–147 (.498) | 107–69 (.608) | | |
| Total: | | 657–655 (.501) | | | |
National champion Postseason invitational champion Conference regular season champion Conference regular season and conference tournament champion Division regular season champion Division regular season and conference tournament champion Conference tournament champion

== Postseason ==
=== NCAA Division I tournament results ===
The Pioneers have appeared in the NCAA Division I Tournament five times. Their combined record is 1–5.

| Year | Seed | Round | Opponent | Result |
|---|---|---|---|---|
| 2006 | (15) | First Round | (2) Maryland | L 54–95 |
| 2009 | (14) | First Round | (3) Ohio State | L 63–77 |
| 2012 | (13) | First Round | (4) Georgia Tech | L 50–76 |
| 2023 | (16) | First Four; First Round | (16) Southern (1) Stanford | W 57–47; L 49–92 |
| 2024 | (16) | First Four | (16) Presbyterian | L 42–49 |

=== WNIT results ===
| Year | Round | Opponent | Result |
|---|---|---|---|
| 2016 | First Round | Drake | L 59–95 |
| 2017 | First Round | St. John's | L 43–72 |
| 2019 | First Round | Georgetown | L 59–90 |
