= Ed Swanson =

American basketball coach

Biographical details
- Education: Sacred Heart (1989)

Coaching career (HC unless noted)

Women's basketball
- 1990–2013: Sacred Heart
- 2013–2022: William & Mary

Men's basketball
- 2022–present: Hampton Roads Academy (Varsity HC)

Head coaching record
- Overall: 532–392 (.576) (NCAA)

Accomplishments and honors

Awards
- NECC coach of the year (1996); 4× NEC coach of the year (2004, 2008, 2009, 2012); CAA coach of the year (2020)

Ed Swanson is an American basketball coach who was the head coach of the Sacred Heart Pioneers women's basketball team from 1990 until 2013 and the William & Mary Tribe women's basketball team from 2013 until 2022. As of the 2025–26 academic year, Swanson is the head coach of the varsity boys basketball team at Hampton Roads Academy in Newport News, Virginia.

== Coaching career ==
On March 22, 2022, his contract at William & Mary was not renewed after nine seasons as head coach of the women's basketball team. Swanson's combined record leading the tribe was 126–128 (.496).

The following year Swanson was hired as the head coach of the varsity boys basketball team at Hampton Roads Academy in. Newport News, Virginia.
