= Minyon Moore (basketball) =

American basketball coach and former player

Current position
- Title: Head coach
- Team: Long Beach State
- Conference: Big West
- Record: 0–0 (–)

Biographical details
- Born: October 17, 1998 (age 27); Sacramento, California

Playing career
- 2016–2019: USC
- 2019–2020: Oregon

Coaching career (HC unless noted)
- 2021–2023: Sacramento State (assistant)
- 2023–2026: TCU (assistant)
- 2026–present: Long Beach State

Head coaching record
- Overall: 0–0 (–)

Accomplishments and honors

Awards
- 3× Pac-12 All-Defensive team (2018–2020)

Minyon Deanna Moore (min-yawn; born October 17, 1998) is an American basketball coach and former basketball player who is currently the head coach of the California State University, Long Beach women's basketball team.

== Playing career ==
Moore played college basketball at USC from 2016 to 2019, where she was a two-time Pac-12 All-Defensive team selection. Moore transferred to Oregon prior to the 2019–20 season, where she took on a lesser scoring role and was credited for her defensive play, earning another Pac-12 All-Defensive team selection in her lone season.

== Coaching career ==
Moore began her coaching career at Sacramento State under former Oregon assistant Mark Campbell. She joined Campbell in a similar role when he accepted the head coaching position at TCU, working with the program's guards and overseeing defensive strategy.

=== Long Beach State ===
Moore was named the head women's basketball coach at Long Beach State on May 19, 2026.

== Head coaching record ==
Record table
Season	Team	Overall	Conference	Standing	Postseason
Long Beach State Beach (Big West Conference) (2026–present)
2026–27	Long Beach State	0–0	0–0		
Long Beach State:		0–0 (–)	0–0 (–)		
Total:		0–0 (–)			
National champion Postseason invitational champion Conference regular season champion Conference regular season and conference tournament champion Division regular season champion Division regular season and conference tournament champion Conference tournament champion

== Personal life ==
Moore's sister Mariya played college basketball at Louisville and USC. The two sisters played together at USC during the 2018–19 season.
