= Mark Campbell (basketball) =

American basketball coach

Current position
- Title: Head coach
- Team: TCU
- Conference: Big 12
- Record: 87–22 (.798)

Biographical details
- Born: March 25, 1980 (age 46); Bellingham, Washington, U.S.

Playing career
- 1998–1999: Cal Poly
- 1999–2000: Clackamas CC
- 2001–2003: Hawaii
- Position: Point guard

Coaching career (HC unless noted)

Men's basketball
- 2005–2007: Clackamas CC (assistant)
- 2007–2008: Pepperdine (assistant)
- 2008–2009: Saint Mary's (DBO)
- 2009–2010: Saint Mary's (assistant)

Women's basketball
- 2010–2013: Oregon State (assistant)
- 2013–2014: Oregon State (associate HC)
- 2014–2015: Oregon (assistant)
- 2015–2021: Oregon (associate HC)
- 2021–2023: Sacramento State
- 2023–present: TCU

Head coaching record
- Overall: 126–46 (.733)

Accomplishments and honors

Championships
- Big Sky regular season champion (2023); Big Sky tournament champion (2023); 2× Big 12 regular season champion (2025, 2026); Big 12 tournament champion (2025)

Awards
- Big Sky Coach of the Year (2023); Big 12 Coach of the Year (2025)

Mark Campbell (born March 25, 1980) is an American basketball coach who is currently the head women's basketball coach at TCU.

== Playing career ==
Campbell initially played at Cal Poly before transferring to Clackamas Community College. At Clackamas, he led the nation in assists at 10.2 per game before transferring out to Hawaii to finish his career.

== Coaching career ==
Campbell started his coaching career at Clackamas Community College as a volunteer assistant before going on to coach at Pepperdine as an assistant. He went on to coach at Saint Mary's for two seasons before turning to coaching women's basketball.

Campbell was named an assistant coach at Oregon State in 2011, where he began to establish himself as one of the nation's top recruiters, earning a promotion to associate head coach during his tenure.

=== Oregon ===
Campbell was hired as an assistant at Oregon in 2014, and was promoted to associate head coach in 2015. At Oregon, he played a critical role in the Ducks landing top recruits such as Sabrina Ionescu, Satou Sabally and Ruthy Hebard as well as helping the Ducks land the number-one recruiting class in the country in 2020.

=== Sacramento State ===
Campbell was named the head coach at Sacramento State in 2021.

=== TCU ===
On March 21, 2023, Campbell was named the head coach at TCU.

== Head coaching record ==
Record table
Season	Team	Overall	Conference	Standing	Postseason
Sacramento State Hornets (Big Sky Conference) (2021–2023)
2021–22	Sacramento State	14–16	10–10	7th	
2022–23	Sacramento State	25–8	13–5	T–1st	NCAA First Round
Sacramento State:		39–24 (.619)	23–15 (.605)		
TCU Horned Frogs (Big 12 Conference) (2023–present)
2023–24	TCU	21–12	6–12	T–9th	WBIT Second Round
2024–25	TCU	34–4	16–2	1st	NCAA Elite Eight
2025–26	TCU	32–6	15–3	1st	NCAA Elite Eight
TCU:		87–22 (.798)	37–17 (.685)		
Total:		126–46 (.733)			
National champion Postseason invitational champion Conference regular season champion Conference regular season and conference tournament champion Division regular season champion Division regular season and conference tournament champion Conference tournament champion

== Personal life ==
Campbell is married to the former Ashley Smith, a former basketball player at Vanderbilt. The couple have two daughters, Maley and Makay.
