= Jessica Mannetti =

American basketball coach

Current position
- Title: Head coach
- Team: Sacred Heart
- Conference: MAAC
- Record: 192–195 (.496)

Biographical details
- Education: Concordia College

Coaching career (HC unless noted)
- 2003–2009: Greens Farms Academy
- 2009–2013: Hofstra (assistant)
- 2013–present: Sacred Heart

Head coaching record
- Overall: 192–195 (.496)

Accomplishments and honors

Championships
- 2× NEC tournament (2023, 2024); NEC regular season (2024)

Jessica Mannetti is an American basketball coach and current head coach for the Sacred Heart Pioneers women's basketball team.

== Coaching career ==
Mannetti was head coach at Greens Farms Academy in Westport, Connecticut, from 2003 to 2009. During her time at Green Farms she developed the program from junior varsity status to leading the Dragons to the playoffs in her final season.

=== Hofstra ===
As an assistant coach at Hofstra, she helped guide the Pride to two WNIT appearances, while also bringing in the sixth best mid-major recruiting class in 2011.

=== Sacred Heart ===
Mannetti returned to Connecticut to become head coach at Sacred Heart in 2013, after Ed Swanson left after twenty three years to become the head coach at William & Mary.

== Head coaching record ==
Record table
Season	Team	Overall	Conference	Standing	Postseason
Sacred Heart Pioneers (Northeast Conference) (2013–present)
2013–14	Sacred Heart	12–18	9–9	5th	
2014–15	Sacred Heart	16–13	11–7	4th	
2015–16	Sacred Heart	20–13	16–2	1st	WNIT First Round
2016–17	Sacred Heart	17–15	13–5	T–2nd	WNIT First Round
2017–18	Sacred Heart	14–17	9–9	T–3rd	
2018–19	Sacred Heart	19–13	14–4	2nd	WNIT First Round
2019–20	Sacred Heart	13–17	9–9	5th	
2020–21	Sacred Heart	8–10	8–8		
2021–22	Sacred Heart	8–17	6–12		
2022–23	Sacred Heart	19–14	12–4	2nd	NCAA First Round
2023–24	Sacred Heart	24–10	15–1	1st	NCAA First Four
Sacred Heart Pioneers (MAAC) (2024–present)
2024–25	Sacred Heart	9–20	5–15	T–12th	
2025–26	Sacred Heart	13-18	10-10	T–5th	
Sacred Heart:		192–195 (.496)	137–95 (.591)		
Total:		192–195 (.496)			
National champion Postseason invitational champion Conference regular season champion Conference regular season and conference tournament champion Division regular season champion Division regular season and conference tournament champion Conference tournament champion
