= Billi Chambers =

American basketball coach

Current position
- Title: Head coach
- Team: Xavier
- Conference: Big East
- Record: 19–70 (.213)

Biographical details
- Born: 1981 or 1982 (age 44–45); Cheverly, Maryland, U.S.
- Education: Hofstra University

Playing career
- 1999–2003: Hofstra

Coaching career (HC unless noted)
- 2006–2008: Molloy (asst.)
- 2008–2011: UMBC (asst.)
- 2011–2013: Virginia Tech (asst.)
- 2013–2023: Iona
- 2023–present: Xavier

Administrative career (AD unless noted)
- 2004–2006: East Coast Conference (assoc. commissioner)

Head coaching record
- Overall: 160–223 (.418)
- Tournaments: 0–2 (NCAA)

Accomplishments and honors

Awards
- 2× MAAC Tournament Champion (2016, 2023); Maggie Dixon Award (2014)

Billi Chambers (née Godsey) is an American women's basketball coach who is the current head coach for the Xavier Musketeers. She was previously the head coach for Iona.

== Playing career ==
Chambers played at Hofstra for 4 years playing in 78 games and making 23 starts.

== Coaching career ==
Chambers started her coaching career at Molloy, where she was an assistant, before serving as an assistant at UMBC and Virginia Tech. She got her first head coaching job for Iona where she would coach for ten years. In those ten years she put up an 141–153 record, while winning the MAAC conference tournament twice, making the NCAA Tournament twice losing in the first round both times. On April 5, 2023, Chambers was hired by the Xavier Musketeers to be their next head coach.

== Personal life ==
Chambers is a part of the LBGTQ community and is married to her wife Melba.
