= 2023 NCAA Division I women's basketball tournament =

Women's Basketball Tournament

- Season: 2022–23
- Teams: 68
- Finals site: American Airlines Center, Dallas, Texas
- Champions: LSU Tigers (1st title, 1st title game, 6th Final Four)
- Runner-up: Iowa Hawkeyes (1st title game, 2nd Final Four)
- Semifinalists: South Carolina Gamecocks (5th Final Four); Virginia Tech Hokies (1st Final Four)
- Winning coach: Kim Mulkey (4th title)
- MOP: Angel Reese (LSU)

The 2023 NCAA Division I women's basketball tournament was a single-elimination tournament of 68 teams to determine the National Collegiate Athletic Association (NCAA) Division I college basketball national champion for the 2022–23 NCAA Division I women's basketball season. The 41st edition of the tournament began on March 15, 2023, and concluded on April 2 with the championship game at the American Airlines Center in Dallas.

Atlantic 10 champion Saint Louis, Big Sky champion Sacramento State, Southland champion Southeastern Louisiana, and WAC champion Southern Utah made their NCAA debuts.

== Tournament procedure ==
A total of 68 teams participated in the 2023 tournament, consisting of the 32 conference champions, and 36 "at-large" bids to be extended by the NCAA Selection Committee. The last four at-large teams and teams seeded 65 through 68 overall played in First Four games, whose winners advanced to the 64 team first round.

First four out
NET	School	Conference	Record
47	Columbia	Ivy League	23–5
37	Kansas	Big 12	19–11
59	Massachusetts	A10	26–6
19	Oregon	Pac-12	17–14

== Schedule and venues ==
2023 Subregionals – Fri/Sun (pink) and Sat/Mon (green)
2023 NCAA Regionals (blue) and Final Four (red)

The first two rounds, also referred to as the subregionals, were played at the sites of the top 16 seeds, as was done from 2016 to 2019.

A dramatic change from past tournaments is that the regional rounds (Sweet Sixteen and Elite Eight) were held at two sites, instead of the four used in past tournaments. Two regionals were held in Greenville, South Carolina and the other two were held in Seattle. Specific regional names were to be announced by the NCAA committee on or before selections were announced on March 12, 2023.

First Four

- March 15—16
- Four of the campuses seeded in the Top 16

Subregionals (first and second rounds)

- March 17 and 19 (Fri/Sun)
  - Colonial Life Arena, Columbia, South Carolina (Host: University of South Carolina)
  - Edmund P. Joyce Center, Notre Dame, Indiana (Host: University of Notre Dame)
  - XFINITY Center, College Park, Maryland (Host: University of Maryland)
  - Pete Maravich Assembly Center, Baton Rouge, Louisiana (Host: Louisiana State University)
  - Jon M. Huntsman Center, Salt Lake City, Utah (Host: University of Utah)
  - Cassell Coliseum, Blacksburg, Virginia (Host: Virginia Tech)
  - Maples Pavilion, Stanford, California (Host: Stanford University)
  - Carver–Hawkeye Arena, Iowa City, Iowa (Host: University of Iowa)
- March 18 and 20 (Sat/Mon)
  - Pauley Pavilion, Los Angeles, California (Host: University of California, Los Angeles)
  - Simon Skjodt Assembly Hall, Bloomington, Indiana (Host: Indiana University)
  - Finneran Pavilion, Villanova, Pennsylvania (Host: Villanova University)
  - Thompson–Boling Arena, Knoxville, Tennessee (Host: University of Tennessee)
  - Value City Arena, Columbus, Ohio (Host: Ohio State University)
  - Harry A. Gampel Pavilion, Storrs, Connecticut (Host: University of Connecticut)
  - Moody Center, Austin, Texas (Host: University of Texas at Austin)
  - Cameron Indoor Stadium, Durham, North Carolina (Host: Duke University)

Regional semifinals and finals (Sweet Sixteen and Elite Eight)

- March 24—27
  - Greenville regional
    - Bon Secours Wellness Arena, Greenville, South Carolina (Hosts: Furman University and the Southern Conference)
  - Seattle regional
    - Climate Pledge Arena, Seattle, Washington (Hosts: Seattle University and the Western Athletic Conference)

National semifinals and championship (Final Four and championship)

- March 31 and April 2
  - American Airlines Center, Dallas, Texas (Hosts: Southern Methodist University and the Big 12 Conference/Conference USA)

This is the second time the women's Final Four will be played in Dallas (2017).

== Qualification and selection ==
=== Automatic qualifiers ===
The following teams automatically qualified for the 2023 NCAA field by virtue of winning their conference's tournament.

Conference	Team	Record	Appearance	Last bid
America East	Vermont	25–6	7th	2010
American	East Carolina	23–9	3rd	2007
ASUN	Florida Gulf Coast	32–3	9th	2022
Atlantic 10	Saint Louis	17–17	1st	Never
ACC	Virginia Tech	27–4	12th	2022
Big 12	Iowa State	22–9	21st	2022
Big East	UConn	29–5	34th	2022
Big Sky	Sacramento State	25–7	1st	Never
Big South	Gardner–Webb	29–4	2nd	2011
Big Ten	Iowa	26–6	29th	2022
Big West	Hawaiʻi	18–14	8th	2022
Colonial	Monmouth	18–15	2nd	1983
C-USA	Middle Tennessee	28–4	20th	2021
Horizon	Cleveland State	30–4	3rd	2010
Ivy League	Princeton	23–5	10th	2022
MAAC	Iona	26–6	2nd	2016
MAC	Toledo	28−4	9th	2017
MEAC	Norfolk State	26–6	2nd	2002
Missouri Valley	Drake	22–9	14th	2019
Mountain West	UNLV	31–2	10th	2022
Northeast	Sacred Heart	18–13	4th	2012
Ohio Valley	Tennessee Tech	22–9	11th	2000
Pac-12	Washington State	23–10	4th	2022
Patriot	Holy Cross	24–8	13th	2007
SEC	South Carolina	32–0	19th	2022
Southern	Chattanooga	20–12	16th	2017
Southland	Southeastern Louisiana	21–9	1st	Never
SWAC	Southern	18–14	5th	2019
Summit	South Dakota State	28–5	11th	2021
Sun Belt	James Madison	26–7	13th	2016
West Coast	Portland	23–8	5th	1997
WAC	Southern Utah	23–9	1st	Never

=== Bids by state ===
Bids	State(s)	Schools
5	North Carolina	Duke, East Carolina, Gardner-Webb, NC State, North Carolina
4	California	Sacramento State, Southern California, Stanford, UCLA
4	Florida	FGCU, Florida State, Miami, South Florida
4	Tennessee	Chattanooga, Middle Tennessee, Tennessee, Tennessee Tech
3	Indiana	Indiana, Notre Dame, Purdue
3	Iowa	Drake, Iowa, Iowa State
3	Louisiana	LSU, SE Louisiana, Southern
3	Ohio	Cleveland State, Ohio State, Toledo
3	Virginia	James Madison, Norfolk State, Virginia Tech
2	Connecticut	Sacred Heart, UConn
2	Mississippi	Mississippi State, Ole Miss
2	New Jersey	Monmouth, Princeton
2	New York	Iona, St. John's
2	Oklahoma	Oklahoma, Oklahoma State
2	Texas	Baylor, Texas
2	Utah	Southern Utah, Utah
2	Washington	Gonzaga, Washington State
1	Alabama	Alabama
1	Arizona	Arizona
1	Colorado	Colorado
1	Georgia	Georgia
1	Hawaii	Hawaiʻi
1	Illinois	Illinois
1	Kentucky	Louisville
1	Maryland	Maryland
1	Massachusetts	Holy Cross
1	Michigan	Michigan
1	Missouri	Saint Louis
1	Nebraska	Creighton
1	Nevada	UNLV
1	Oregon	Portland
1	Pennsylvania	Villanova
1	South Carolina	South Carolina
1	South Dakota	South Dakota State
1	Vermont	Vermont
1	West Virginia	West Virginia
1	Wisconsin	Marquette

=== Tournament seeds (list by region) ===
The tournament seeds and regions were determined through the NCAA basketball tournament selection process.

Greenville Regional 1 – Bon Secours Wellness Arena, Greenville, SC
Seed	School	Conference	Record	Berth type	Last bid
1	South Carolina	SEC	32–0	Automatic	2022
2	Maryland	Big Ten	25-6	At-Large	2022
3	Notre Dame	ACC	25–5	At-Large	2022
4	UCLA	Pac-12	25–9	At-Large	2021
5	Oklahoma	Big 12	25–6	At-Large	2022
6	Creighton	Big East	22–8	At-Large	2022
7	Arizona	Pac-12	21–9	At-Large	2022
8	South Florida	American	26–6	At-Large	2022
9	Marquette	Big East	21–10	At-Large	2021
10	West Virginia	Big 12	19–11	At-Large	2021
11*	Illinois	Big Ten	22–9	At-Large	2003
11*	Mississippi State	SEC	20–10	At-Large	2019
12	Portland	WCC	23–8	Automatic	1997
13	Sacramento State	Big Sky	25–7	Automatic	Never
14	Southern Utah	WAC	23–9	Automatic	Never
15	Holy Cross	Patriot	23–8	Automatic	2007
16	Norfolk State	MEAC	26–6	Automatic	2002

Greenville Regional 2 – Bon Secours Wellness Arena, Greenville, SC
Seed	School	Conference	Record	Berth type	Last bid
1	Indiana	Big Ten	27–4	At-Large	2022
2	Utah	Pac-12	25–4	At-Large	2022
3	LSU	SEC	28–2	At-Large	2022
4	Villanova	Big East	28–6	At-Large	2022
5	Washington State	Pac-12	23–10	Automatic	2022
6	Michigan	Big Ten	22–10	At-Large	2022
7	NC State	ACC	20–11	At-Large	2022
8	Oklahoma State	Big 12	21–11	At-Large	2021
9	Miami (FL)	ACC	19–12	At-Large	2022
10	Princeton	Ivy League	23–5	Automatic	2022
11	UNLV	Mountain West	31–2	Automatic	2022
12	Florida Gulf Coast	ASUN	32–3	Automatic	2022
13	Cleveland State	Horizon	30–4	Automatic	2010
14	Hawaiʻi	Big West	18–14	Automatic	2022
15	Gardner–Webb	Big South	29–4	Automatic	2011
16*	Tennessee Tech	Ohio Valley	22–9	Automatic	2000
16*	Monmouth	Colonial	18–15	Automatic	1983

Seattle Regional 3 – Climate Pledge Arena, Seattle, WA
Seed	School	Conference	Record	Berth type	Last bid
1	Virginia Tech	ACC	27–4	Automatic	2022
2	UConn	Big East	29–5	Automatic	2022
3	Ohio State	Big Ten	25–7	At-Large	2022
4	Tennessee	SEC	23–11	At-Large	2022
5	Iowa State	Big 12	22–9	Automatic	2022
6	North Carolina	ACC	21–11	At-Large	2022
7	Baylor	Big 12	19–12	At-Large	2022
8	USC	Pac-12	21–10	At-Large	2014
9	South Dakota State	Summit	28–5	Automatic	2021
10	Alabama	SEC	20–10	At-Large	2021
11*	Purdue	Big Ten	19–11	At-Large	2017
11*	St. John's	Big East	22–9	At-Large	2016
12	Toledo	MAC	28–4	Automatic	2017
13	Saint Louis	Atlantic 10	17–17	Automatic	Never
14	James Madison	Sun Belt	26–7	Automatic	2016
15	Vermont	America East	25–6	Automatic	2010
16	Chattanooga	Southern	20–12	Automatic	2017

Seattle Regional 4 – Climate Pledge Arena, Seattle, WA
Seed	School	Conference	Record	Berth type	Last bid
1	Stanford	Pac-12	28–6	At-Large	2022
2	Iowa	Big Ten	26–6	Automatic	2022
3	Duke	ACC	25–6	At-Large	2018
4	Texas	Big 12	25–9	At-Large	2022
5	Louisville	ACC	23–11	At-Large	2022
6	Colorado	Pac-12	23–8	At-Large	2022
7	Florida State	ACC	23–9	At-Large	2022
8	Ole Miss	SEC	23–8	At-Large	2022
9	Gonzaga	WCC	28–4	At-Large	2022
10	Georgia	SEC	21–11	At-Large	2022
11	Middle Tennessee	C-USA	28–4	Automatic	2021
12	Drake	Missouri Valley	22–9	Automatic	2019
13	East Carolina	American	23–9	Automatic	2007
14	Iona	MAAC	26–6	Automatic	2016
15	Southeastern Louisiana	Southland	21–9	Automatic	Never
16*	Southern	SWAC	18–14	Automatic	2019
16*	Sacred Heart	Northeast	18–13	Automatic	2012

*See First Four

== Tournament records ==
- Virginia Tech's Georgia Amoore hit 24 3-pointers in the tournament, setting the record for most three pointers in a single tournament, surpassing the record of 22 set by UConn's Kia Nurse in 2017, and tied by Arizona's Aari Mcdonald in 2021.
- Iowa's Caitlin Clark set numerous NCAA tournament records, including most points scored (191), most assists (60), and most 3-point field goals in a national championship game (8). Clark also became the first player in tournament history to post back-to-back 40-point games, with 41 in the regional final, followed by 41 in the Final Four.

== Tournament bracket ==
All times are listed in Eastern Daylight Time (UTC−4)
* denotes overtime period

=== First Four ===
The First Four games involve eight teams: the four overall lowest-ranked teams and the four lowest-ranked at-large teams.

March 15 – Greenville Region 1 College Park, Maryland
11	Illinois	56
11	Mississippi State	70

March 16 – Greenville Region 1 Greenville, South Carolina
16	Tennessee Tech	79
16	Monmouth	69

March 16 – Greenville Region 2 Notre Dame, Indiana
11	Purdue	64
11	St. John's	66

March 15 – Seattle Region 4 Stanford, California
16	Southern	47
16	Sacred Heart	57

=== Greenville Regional 1 – Bon Secours Wellness Arena, Greenville, SC ===
First round Round of 64; March 17–18
1	South Carolina	72
16	Norfolk State	40
Columbia, SC – Fri/Sun
8	South Florida	67
9	Marquette	65
5	Oklahoma	85
12	Portland	63
Los Angeles, CA – Sat/Mon
4	UCLA	67
13	Sacramento State	45
6	Creighton	66
11	Mississippi State	81
Notre Dame, IN – Fri/Sun
3	Notre Dame	82
14	Southern Utah	56
7	Arizona	75
10	West Virginia	62
College Park, MD – Fri/Sun
2	Maryland	93
15	Holy Cross	61

Second Round; Round of 32; March 19–20
1	South Carolina	76
8	South Florida	45
5	Oklahoma	73
4	UCLA	82
11	Mississippi State	48
3	Notre Dame	53
7	Arizona	64
2	Maryland	77

Regional semifinals Sweet 16; March 25
1	South Carolina	59
4	UCLA	43
3	Notre Dame	59
2	Maryland	76

Regional Final; Elite 8 March 27
1	South Carolina	86
2	Maryland	75

==== Greenville Regional 1 final ====
ESPN

March 27
7:00 p.m. EDT

No. 1 South Carolina Gamecocks 86, No. 2 Maryland Terrapins 75
Scoring by quarter: 15–21, 23–7, 24–20, 24–25
Pts: Aliyah Boston (22); Rebs: Aliyah Boston (10); Asts: Brea Beal (6)	Pts: Diamond Miller (24); Rebs: Tied (5); Asts: Shyanne Sellers (6)

Bon Secours Wellness Arena, Greenville, SC
Attendance: 11,114
Referees: Gina Cross, Angelica Suffren, Julie Krommenhoek

==== Greenville Regional 1 all-tournament team ====
- Aliyah Boston (MOP) – South Carolina
- Brea Beal – South Carolina
- Zia Cooke – South Carolina
- Abby Meyers – Maryland
- Diamond Miller – Maryland

=== Greenville Regional 2 – Bon Secours Wellness Arena, Greenville, SC ===
First round Round of 64; March 17–18
1	Indiana	77
16	Tennessee Tech	47
Bloomington, Indiana – Sat/Mon
8	Oklahoma State	61
9	Miami (FL)	62
5	Washington State	63
12	Florida Gulf Coast	74
Villanova, Pennsylvania – Sat/Mon
4	Villanova	76
13	Cleveland State	59
6	Michigan	71
11	UNLV	59
Baton Rouge, Louisiana – Fri/Sun
3	LSU	73
14	Hawaiʻi	50
7	NC State	63
10	Princeton	64
Salt Lake City, Utah – Fri/Sun
2	Utah	103
15	Gardner–Webb	77

Second Round; Round of 32; March 19–20
1	Indiana	68
9	Miami (FL)	70
12	Florida Gulf Coast	57
4	Villanova	76
6	Michigan	42
3	LSU	66
10	Princeton	56
2	Utah	63

Regional semifinals Sweet 16; March 24
9	Miami (FL)	70
4	Villanova	65
3	LSU	66
2	Utah	63

Regional Final; Elite 8 March 26
9	Miami (FL)	42
3	LSU	54

==== Greenville Regional 2 final ====
ESPN

March 26
7:00 pm EDT

No. 9 Miami Hurricanes 42, No. 3 LSU Tigers 54
Scoring by quarter: 8–10, 12–16, 7–12, 15–16
Pts: Jasmyne Roberts (22); Rebs: Tied (7); Asts: Jasmyne Roberts (3)	Pts: Alexis Morris (21); Rebs: Angel Reese (18); Asts: Tied (4)

Bon Secours Wellness Arena, Greenville, SC
Attendance: 7,988
Referees: Dee Kantner, Michol Murray, Timothy Daley

==== Greenville Regional 2 all-tournament team ====
- Angel Reese (MOP) – LSU
- Alexis Morris – LSU
- Jasmyne Roberts – Miami (FL)
- Gianna Kneepkens – Utah
- Maddy Siegrist – Villanova

=== Seattle Regional 3 – Climate Pledge Arena – Seattle, WA ===
First round Round of 64; March 17–18
1	Virginia Tech	58
16	Chattanooga	33
Blacksburg, VA – Fri/Sun
8	USC	57
9	South Dakota State	62
5	Iowa State	73
12	Toledo	80
Knoxville, TN – Sat/Mon
4	Tennessee	95
13	Saint Louis	50
6	North Carolina	61
11	St. John's	59
Columbus, OH – Sat/Mon
3	Ohio State	80
14	James Madison	66
7	Baylor	78
10	Alabama	74
Storrs, CT – Sat/Mon
2	UConn	95
15	Vermont	52

Second Round; Round of 32; March 19–20
1	Virginia Tech	72
9	South Dakota State	60
12	Toledo	47
4	Tennessee	94
6	North Carolina	69
3	Ohio State	71
7	Baylor	58
2	UConn	77

Regional semifinals Sweet 16; March 25
1	Virginia Tech	73
4	Tennessee	64
3	Ohio State	73
2	UConn	61

Regional Final; Elite 8 March 27
1	Virginia Tech	84
3	Ohio State	74

==== Seattle Regional 3 final ====
ESPN

March 27
6:00 pm PDT

No. 1 Virginia Tech Hokies 84, No. 3 Ohio State Buckeyes 74
Scoring by quarter: 22–25, 26–20, 15–10, 21–19
Pts: Elizabeth Kitley (25); Rebs: Elizabeth Kitley (12); Asts: Tied (2)	Pts: Taylor Mikesell (25); Rebs: Cotie McMahon (7); Asts: Tied (3)

Climate Pledge Arena – Seattle, WA
Attendance: 8,466
Referees: Brenda Pantoja, Roy Gulbeyan, Katie Lukanich

==== Seattle Regional 3 all-tournament team ====
- Georgia Amoore (MOP) – Virginia Tech
- Elizabeth Kitley – Virginia Tech
- Cotie McMahon – Ohio State
- Jacy Sheldon – Ohio State
- Lou Lopez Sénéchal – UConn

=== Seattle Regional 4 – Climate Pledge Arena – Seattle, WA ===
First round Round of 64; March 17–18
1	Stanford	92
16	Sacred Heart	49
Stanford, CA – Fri/Sun
8	Ole Miss	71
9	Gonzaga	48
5	Louisville	83
12	Drake	81
Austin, TX – Sat/Mon
4	Texas	79
13	East Carolina	40
6	Colorado	82
11	Middle Tennessee	60
Durham, NC – Sat/Mon
3	Duke	89
14	Iona	49
7	Florida State	54
10	Georgia	66
Iowa City, Iowa – Fri/Sun
2	Iowa	95
15	Southeastern Louisiana	43

Second Round; Round of 32; March 19–20
1	Stanford	49
8	Ole Miss	54
5	Louisville	73
4	Texas	51
6	Colorado	61*
3	Duke	53
10	Georgia	66
2	Iowa	74

Regional semifinals Sweet 16; March 24
8	Ole Miss	62
5	Louisville	72
6	Colorado	77
2	Iowa	87

Regional Final; Elite 8 March 26
5	Louisville	83
2	Iowa	97

==== Seattle Regional 4 final ====
ESPN

March 26
6:00 pm PDT

No. 5 Louisville Cardinals 83, No. 2 Iowa Hawkeyes 97
Scoring by quarter: 21–25, 22–23, 16–30, 24–19
Pts: Hailey Van Lith (27); Rebs: Olivia Cochran (14); Asts: Mykasa Robinson (5)	Pts: Caitlin Clark (41); Rebs: Caitlin Clark (10); Asts: Caitlin Clark (12)

Climate Pledge Arena – Seattle, WA
Attendance: 11,700
Referees: Kevin Pethel, Brian Hall, In'Fini Robinson

Caitlin Clark, Iowa's star player, made NCAA tournament history by becoming the first player to score a 40-point triple-double, with 41 points, 10 rebounds, and 12 assists. The junior either scored or assisted on every field goal in the Hawkeyes' 25-point first quarter, which helped the Hawkeyes advance to their first Final Four since 1993.

==== Seattle Regional 4 all-tournament team ====
- Caitlin Clark (MOP) – Iowa
- Monika Czinano – Iowa
- McKenna Warnock – Iowa
- Hailey Van Lith – Louisville
- Frida Formann – Colorado

=== Final Four - American Airlines Center – Dallas, TX ===
National semifinals Final Four; Friday, March 31
GR1(1)	South Carolina	73
SR4(2)	Iowa	77
GR2(3)	LSU	79
SR3(1)	Virginia Tech	72

National Championship Game; Sunday, April 2
SR4(2)	Iowa	85
GR2(3)	LSU	102

==== National semifinals ====
ESPN

March 31
6:00 pm CDT

G3 LSU Tigers 79, S1 Virginia Tech Hokies 72
Scoring by quarter: 16–13, 16–21, 18–25, 29–13
Pts: Alexis Morris (27); Rebs: Angel Reese (12); Asts: Kateri Poole (3)	Pts: Elizabeth Kitley (18); Rebs: Elizabeth Kitley (12); Asts: Elizabeth Kitley (3)

American Airlines Center – Dallas, TX
Referees: Maj Forsberg, Angelica Suffren, Gina Cross

ESPN

March 31
8:30 pm CDT

G1 South Carolina Gamecocks 73, S2 Iowa Hawkeyes 77
Scoring by quarter: 13–22, 24–16, 18–21, 18–18
Pts: Zia Cooke (24); Rebs: Kamilla Cardoso (14); Asts: Aliyah Boston (3)	Pts: Caitlin Clark (41); Rebs: Kate Martin (7); Asts: Caitlin Clark (8)

American Airlines Center – Dallas, TX
Attendance: 19,288
Referees: Dee Kantner, Brenda Pantoja, Tiffany Bird

==== National championship ====
ABC

April 2
2:30 pm CDT

S2 Iowa Hawkeyes 85, G3 LSU Tigers 102
Scoring by quarter: 22–27, 20–32, 22–16, 21–27
Pts: Caitlin Clark (30); Rebs: Tied (6); Asts: Caitlin Clark (8)	Pts: Jasmine Carson (22); Rebs: Angel Reese (10); Asts: Alexis Morris (9)

American Airlines Center – Dallas, TX

==== Final Four all-tournament team ====
- Angel Reese, LSU (MOP)
- Alexis Morris, LSU
- Jasmine Carson, LSU
- Caitlin Clark, Iowa
- Zia Cooke, South Carolina

== Game summaries and tournament notes ==
=== Upsets ===
Per the NCAA, "Upsets are defined as when the winner of the game was seeded five or more places lower than the team it defeated." The 2023 tournament saw a total of six upsets, with three in the first round, two in the second round, and one in the Sweet Sixteen. Stanford's loss to Ole Miss marked the first time a No. 1 seed failed to make the Sweet Sixteen since 2009. With Indiana's loss to Miami, this marked the first time two No. 1 seeds failed to make the Sweet Sixteen since 1998. UConn's loss to Ohio State in the Sweet 16 marked the first time since 2007 that UConn did not make it to the Women's Final Four. With Tennessee's loss to Virginia Tech in the Sweet 16 this marked the first time since 2006 that the Women's Final Four did not feature either UConn or Tennessee.

Round	Greenville 1	Seattle 4	Greenville 2	Seattle 3
First round	No. 11 Mississippi State defeated No. 6 Creighton, 79–64.	None	No. 12 Florida Gulf Coast defeated No. 5 Washington State, 74–63.	No. 12 Toledo defeated No. 5 Iowa State, 80–73.
Second Round	None	No. 8 Ole Miss defeated No. 1 Stanford, 54–49.	No. 9 Miami (FL) defeated No. 1 Indiana, 70–68.	None
Sweet 16	None	None	No. 9 Miami (FL) defeated No. 4 Villanova, 70–65.	None
Elite 8	None	None	None	None
Final 4	None			

== Record by conference ==
Conference	Bids	Record	Win %	FF	R64	R32	S16	E8	F4	CG	NC
SEC	7	17–6	.739	1	7	6	4	2	2	1	1
Big Ten	7	13–7	.650	2	5	5	3	3	1	1	–
ACC	8	14–8	.636	–	8	6	4	3	1	–	–
Pac-12	7	8–7	.533	–	7	5	3	–	–	–	–
Big East	5	5–5	.500	1	5	2	2	–	–	–	–
Big 12	6	3–6	.333	–	6	3	–	–	–	–	–
ASUN	1	1–1	.500	–	1	1	–	–	–	–	–
Ivy League	1	1–1	.500	–	1	1	–	–	–	–	–
MAC	1	1–1	.500	–	1	1	–	–	–	–	–
Summit	1	1–1	.500	–	1	1	–	–	–	–	–
American	2	1–2	.333	–	2	1	–	–	–	–	–
WCC	2	0–2	.000	–	2	–	–	–	–	–	–
Northeast	1	1–1	.500	1	1	–	–	–	–	–	–
Ohio Valley	1	1–1	.500	1	1	–	–	–	–	–	–
America East	1	0–1	.000	–	1	–	–	–	–	–	–
Atlantic 10	1	0–1	.000	–	1	–	–	–	–	–	–
Big Sky	1	0–1	.000	–	1	–	–	–	–	–	–
Big South	1	0–1	.000	–	1	–	–	–	–	–	–
Big West	1	0–1	.000	–	1	–	–	–	–	–	–
C-USA	1	0–1	.000	–	1	–	–	–	–	–	–
Horizon	1	0–1	.000	–	1	–	–	–	–	–	–
MAAC	1	0–1	.000	–	1	–	–	–	–	–	–
MEAC	1	0–1	.000	–	1	–	–	–	–	–	–
Missouri Valley	1	0–1	.000	–	1	–	–	–	–	–	–
Mountain West	1	0–1	.000	–	1	–	–	–	–	–	–
Patriot	1	0–1	.000	–	1	–	–	–	–	–	–
Southern	1	0–1	.000	–	1	–	–	–	–	–	–
Southland	1	0–1	.000	–	1	–	–	–	–	–	–
Sun Belt	1	0–1	.000	–	1	–	–	–	–	–	–
WAC	1	0–1	.000	–	1	–	–	–	–	–	–
Colonial	1	0–1	.000	1	–	–	–	–	–	–	–
SWAC	1	0–1	.000	1	–	–	–	–	–	–	–

- The FF, R64, R32, S16, E8, F4, CG, and NC columns indicate how many teams from each conference were in the first four, round of 64 (first round), round of 32 (second round), Sweet 16, Elite Eight, Final Four, championship game, and national champion, respectively.

== Media coverage ==
=== Television ===
All games in the tournament were televised by ESPN networks or ABC; this was the second-to-last year of its current contract to air NCAA tournaments, which lasts through the 2023–24 season. On August 23, 2022, ESPN announced that the national championship game would be broadcast by ABC for the first time, with a Sunday afternoon scheduling. This marked the first time the women's championship game would be carried on broadcast television since 1995.

Viewership of the tournament was up by 42% year-over-year. With significant attention towards Iowa player Caitlin Clark, the Iowa/South Carolina semi-final game was seen by an average of 5.5 million viewers—making it the highest-rated Women's Final Four telecast in ESPN history. These numbers would be surpassed by the national championship game, which was seen by an average of 9.9 million viewers, and peaked at 12.6 million—making it the most-watched women's college basketball game of all-time. It was a 103% increase over the previous year's championship game, which was carried by ESPN in primetime.

==== Studio host and analysts ====
- Elle Duncan (Host) (First Four, First, Second rounds, Regionals, Final Four, and National championship game)
- Kelsey Riggs (Host) (First Four, First, and Second rounds)
- Rebecca Lobo (Analyst) (First Four, First, Second rounds, Final Four, and National championship game)
- Andraya Carter (Analyst) (First Four, First, Second rounds, Final Four, and National championship game)
- Nikki Fargas (Analyst) (First Four, First, Second rounds, and Regionals)
- Monica McNutt (Analyst) (First Four, First, Second rounds, Regionals, Final Four, and National championship game)
- Carolyn Peck (Analyst) (Final Four and National championship game)

==== Commentary teams ====
First Four

- Jenn Hildreth and Mike Thibault – Notre Dame, Indiana
- Brenda VanLengen and Holly Warlick – Bloomington, Indiana
- Sam Gore and Kim Adams – Columbus, Ohio
- Roy Philpott and Brooke Weisbrod – Stanford, California

First & second rounds Friday/Sunday (Subregionals)

- Courtney Lyle and Carolyn Peck – Columbia, South Carolina
- Jenn Hildreth and Mike Thibault – Notre Dame, Indiana
- Tiffany Greene and Jimmy Dykes – College Park, Maryland
- Kevin Fitzgerald and Andrea Lloyd-Curry – Baton Rouge, Louisiana
- Elise Woodward and Dan Hughes – Salt Lake City, Utah
- Angel Gray and Helen Williams – Blacksburg, Virginia
- Roy Philpott and Brooke Weisbrod – Stanford, California
- Dave O'Brien and Christy Winters-Scott – Iowa City, Iowa

First & second rounds Saturday/Monday (Subregionals)

- Ann Schatz and Meghan McKeown – Los Angeles, California
- Brenda VanLengen and Holly Warlick – Bloomington, Indiana
- John Brickley and Aja Ellison – Villanova, Pennsylvania
- Pam Ward and Stephanie White – Knoxville, Tennessee
- Sam Gore and Kim Adams – Columbus, Ohio
- Beth Mowins and Christy Thomaskutty – Storrs, Connecticut
- Eric Frede and Tamika Catchings – Austin, Texas
- Sam Ravech and Kelly Gramlich – Durham, North Carolina

Regionals (Sweet 16 and Elite Eight)

- Beth Mowins, Debbie Antonelli, and Angel Gray – Greenville, South Carolina (Regional 1)
- Courtney Lyle, Carolyn Peck, and Brooke Weisbrod – Greenville, South Carolina (Regional 2)
- Ryan Ruocco, Rebecca Lobo, Holly Rowe, and Andraya Carter – Seattle, Washington (Regional 3)
- Pam Ward, Stephanie White, and Holly Rowe – Seattle, Washington (Regional 4)

Final Four and National Championship

- Ryan Ruocco, Rebecca Lobo, Holly Rowe, and Andraya Carter – Dallas, Texas

=== Radio ===
Westwood One will serve as radio broadcaster of the tournament.

Regionals (Sweet 16 and Elite Eight)

- Lance Medow and Kim Adams – Greenville, South Carolina 1
- Jason Ross Jr. and Debbie Antonelli – Greenville, South Carolina 2
- Dick Fain and Kristen Kozlowski – Seattle, Washington 3
- Matt Chazanow and Krista Blunk – Seattle, Washington 4

Final Four and National Championship

- Ryan Radtke, Debbie Antonelli, and Krista Blunk – Dallas, Texas

== See also ==
- 2023 Women's National Invitation Tournament
- 2023 Women's Basketball Invitational
- 2023 NCAA Division II women's basketball tournament
- 2023 NCAA Division III women's basketball tournament
- 2023 NCAA Division I men's basketball tournament
