= List of NCAA Division I women's basketball season rebounding leaders =

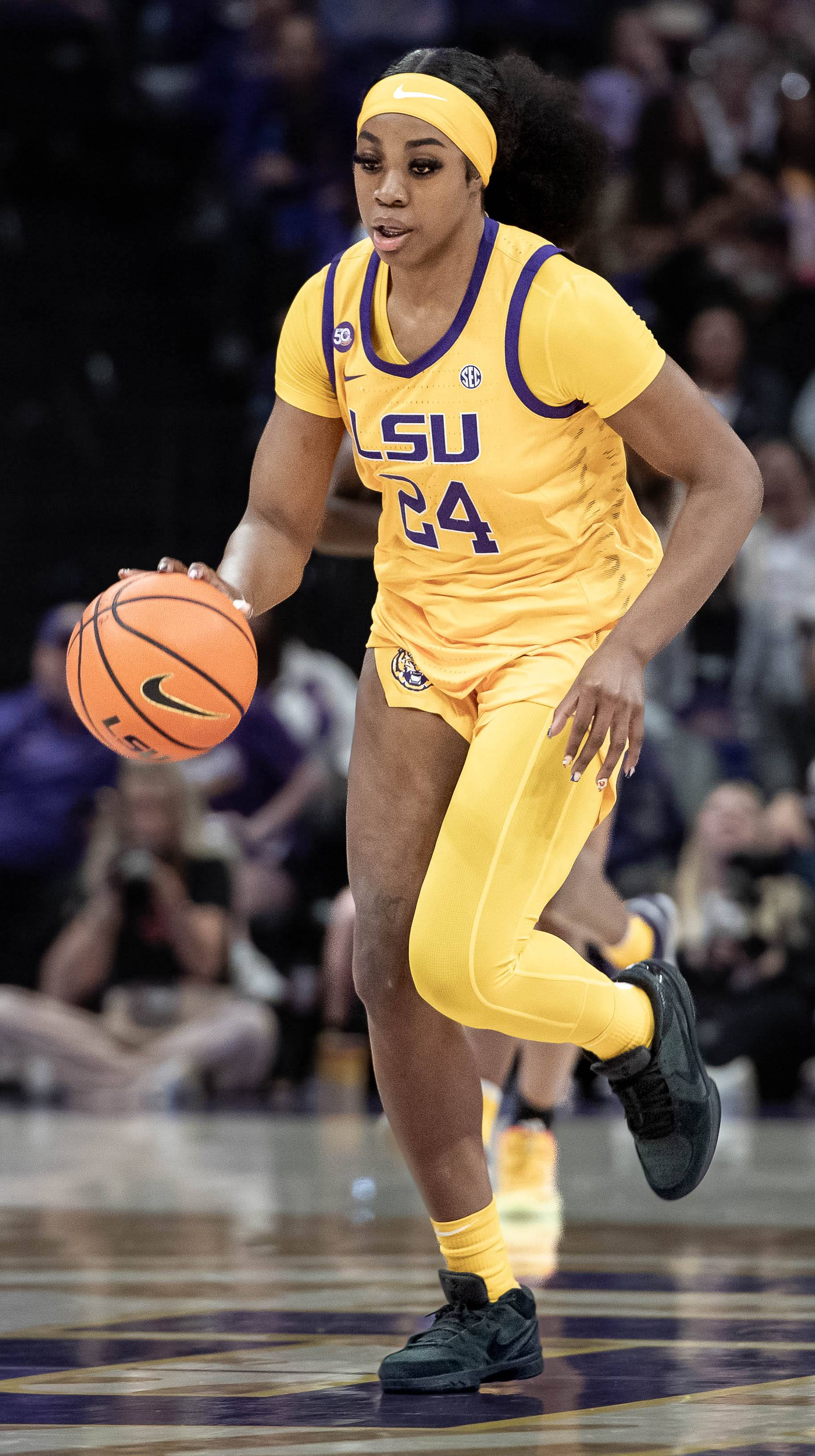
Aneesah Morrow led Division I in rebounding at two different schools—DePaul in 2021–22 and LSU in 2024–25.

In basketball, a rebound is the act of gaining possession of the ball after a missed field goal or free throw. This can happen on offense, when a player recovers the ball after their own or a teammate's missed shot attempt, or on defense when a player recovers the ball after an opponent's missed shot attempt.

Beginning with the 1981–82 season, the NCAA began officially sponsoring women's basketball. That season, Anne Donovan became the first player to lead NCAA Division I women's basketball in rebounds per game (rpg).

Only six players have led NCAA Division I women's basketball in rebounds per game on multiple occasions; Patricia Hoskins (1986–87 and 1988–89) became the first player to accomplish such a feat. She was later joined by Courtney Paris (2005–06 and 2007–08). Judie Lomax (2008–09 and 2009–10) then became the first player to lead Division I in consecutive seasons, and she was immediately followed by Courtney Hurt who replicated the feat in 2010–11 and 2011–12. The most recent player with consecutive rebounding titles is Lauren Gustin in 2022–23 and 2023–24. The most recent player to lead Division I in rebounding twice, as well as the first to have done so for two different programs, is Aneesah Morrow. She led Division I in 2021–22 as a freshman at DePaul and in 2024–25 as a senior at LSU.

== Key ==
Pos.	G	F	C	RPG	Ref.
Position	Guard	Forward	Center	Rebounds per game	References

Class (Cl.) key
Fr	Freshman	So	Sophomore	Jr	Junior	Sr	Senior

*	Elected to the Naismith Basketball Hall of Fame
†	Elected to the Women's Basketball Hall of Fame
Player (X)	Denotes the number of times the player had been the scoring leader up to and including that season

== Season rebounding leaders (per game) ==
All schools are listed with their current athletic brand names, which do not always match those used by a school in the relevant season.

Season	Player	Pos.	Cl.	Team	GP	ORB	DRB	TRB	RPG	Ref.
1981–82	Anne Donovan*		Jr	Old Dominion	28	–	–	412	14.7	
1982–83	Deborah Mitchell		Jr	Mississippi College	28	–	–	447	16.0	
1983–84	Joy Kellogg		Jr	Oklahoma City	23	–	–	373	16.2	
1984–85	Rosina Pearson		Jr	Bethune–Cookman	26	–	–	480	18.5	
1985–86	Wanda Ford		Sr	Drake	30	–	–	506	16.9	
1986–87	Patricia Hoskins		So	Mississippi Valley State	28	–	–	476	17.0	
1987–88	Katie Beck		Sr	East Tennessee State	25	–	–	441	17.6	
1988–89	Patricia Hoskins (2)		Sr	Mississippi Valley State	27	–	–	440	16.3	
1989–90	Pam Hudson		Sr	Northwestern State	29	–	–	438	15.1	
1990–91	Tarcha Hollis		Sr	Grambling	29	–	–	443	15.3	
1991–92	Christy Greis		Jr	Evansville	28	–	–	383	13.7	
1992–93	Ann Barry		Sr	Nevada	25	–	–	355	14.2	
1993–94	DeShawne Blocker		Jr	East Tennessee State	26	–	–	450	17.3	
1994–95	Tera Sheriff		Sr	Jackson State	29	–	–	401	13.8	
1995–96	Dana Wynne		Jr	Seton Hall	29	–	–	372	12.8	
1996–97	Etolia Mitchell		Sr	Georgia State	25	–	–	330	13.2	
1997–98	Alisha Hill		Sr	Howard	30	–	–	397	13.2	
1998–99	Monica Logan		Sr	UMBC	27	–	–	364	13.5	
1999–2000	Malveata Johnson		Jr	North Carolina A&T	27	–	–	363	13.4	
2000–01	Andrea Gardner		Jr	Howard	31	–	–	439	14.2	
2001–02	Mandi Carver		Sr	Idaho State	27	–	–	336	12.4	
2002–03	Jennifer Butler		Sr	UMass	28	166 (Note: The NCAA credits Jennifer Butler with 412 rebounds for an average of 14.7 rebounds per game (rpg) in the 2002–03 season, while Sports-Reference credits Butler with 410 total rebounds (166 offensive rebounds and 244 defensive rebounds), for an average of 14.6 rpg.)	244	412	14.7	
2003–04	Ashlee Kelly	F/C	Sr	Quinnipiac	29	152	240	392	13.5	
2004–05	Sancho Lyttle (Note: The NCAA officially lists Sancho Lyttle as the 2004–05 rebounds per game (rpg) leader with 12.1 rpg; Sports-Reference also lists Lyttle as having recorded 12.1 rpg that season, but lists Sandora Irvin (11.8 rpg) as the season's rpg leader. It is the only season from 2001–02 to 2016–17 that Sports-Reference differs from the NCAA's listing.)	F/C	Sr	Houston	30	142	220	362	12.1	
2005–06	Courtney Paris	C	Fr	Oklahoma	36	169	370	539	15.0	
2006–07	Lachelle Lyles		Sr	Southeast Missouri (Note: "Southeast Missouri" often abbrievated as "SEMO" is the athletic branding for Southeast Missouri State.)	31 (Note: The NCAA credits Lachelle Lyles with 527 rebounds in 31 games played (for a 17.0 rpg average) in the 2006–07 season, while Sports-Reference credits Lyles with 504 total rebounds (209 offensive rebounds and 295 defensive rebounds) in 30 games played (for a 16.8 average).)	209	295	527	17.0	
2007–08	Courtney Paris (2)		Jr	Oklahoma	31	178	288	466	15.0	
2008–09	Judie Lomax		So	Columbia	28	175	226	401	14.3	
2009–10	Judie Lomax (2)		Jr	Columbia	28	173	225	398	14.2	
2010–11	Courtney Hurt	F	Jr	VCU	31	157	228	385	12.4	
2011–12	Courtney Hurt (2)	F	Sr	VCU	34	169	278	447	13.1	
2012–13	Artemis Spanou		Jr	Robert Morris	29	160	291	451	15.6	
2013–14	Jillian Alleyne		So	Oregon	32	216	303	519	16.2	
2014–15	Vicky McIntyre		Sr	Oral Roberts	34	145	391	536	15.8	
2015–16	Anna Strickland	F	Sr	Houston Christian (Note: The Houston Christian University and Houston Christian Huskies were known as Houston Baptist University until 2022.)	29	122	289	411	14.2	
2016–17	Chantel Osahor	F/C	Sr	Washington	34	121	398	519	15.3	
2017–18	Natalie Butler	C	Sr	George Mason	34	186	377	563	16.6	
2018–19	Kristine Anigwe	F/C	Sr	California	33	180	353	533	16.2	
2019–20	Denia Davis-Stweart	F	Sr	Merrimack	29	77	318	395	13.6	
2020–21 (Note: The 2020–21 NCAA Division I women's season was heavily impacted by the COVID-19 pandemic. The Louisiana Ragin' Cajuns specifically had multiple games cancelled as a result of procedures in response to COVID-19.)	Natalie Kucowski	F	Sr	Louisiana	13	35	138	173	13.3	
2021–22	Aneesah Morrow	F	Fr	DePaul	33	191	266	457	13.9	
2022–23	Lauren Gustin	F	Jr	BYU	33	164	387	551	16.7	
2023–24	Lauren Gustin (2)	F	Sr	BYU	33	171	333	504	15.3	
2024–25	Aneesah Morrow (2)	F	Sr	LSU	36	185	300	485	13.5	
2025–26	Megan Nestor	F	Sr	North Texas	33	173	291	464	14.1	

== Multiple-time leaders ==
Rank	Player	Team	Times leader	Years
1	Lauren Gustin	BYU	2	2022–23, 2023–24
1	Patricia Hoskins	Mississippi Valley State	2	1986–87, 1988–89
1	Courtney Hurt	VCU	2	2010–11, 2011–12
1	Judie Lomax	Columbia	2	2008–09, 2009–10
1	Aneesah Morrow	DePaul	2	2021–22, 2024–25
1	Courtney Paris	Oklahoma	2	2005–06, 2007–08

== See also ==
- List of NCAA Division I women's basketball career rebounding leaders
