= List of NCAA Division I women's basketball career steals leaders =

In basketball, a steal is the act of legally gaining possession of the ball by a defensive player who causes the opponent to turn the ball over. The top 25 highest steals totals in National Collegiate Athletic Association (NCAA) Division I women's basketball history are listed below. While the NCAA's current three-division format has been in place since the 1973–74 season, the organization did not sponsor women's sports until the 1981–82 school year; before that time, women's college sports were governed by the Association of Intercollegiate Athletics for Women (AIAW). Steals are a relatively new statistic in college basketball, having only become an official statistic in NCAA women's basketball beginning with the 1987–88 season.

== Key ==
Pos.	G	F	C	Ref.
Position	Guard	Forward	Center	References

^	Player still competing in NCAA Division I
*	Elected to the Naismith Memorial Basketball Hall of Fame
Team (X)	Denotes the number of times a player from that team is represented on this list

== Top 25 career steals leaders ==
Current through the end of the 2025–26 season.

Player	Pos.	Team	Career start (Note: Reflects the calendar year in which the player's Division I career began. All listings of player records in official NCAA record books categorize seasons by the calendar years in which they ended.)	Career end	Games played	Steals	SPG	Ref. (Note: Except as otherwise noted, references for each entry are from the most recent edition of the NCAA Division I women's basketball record book, cited in the "General references" section below.)
Chastadie Barrs	G	Lamar	2015	2019	122	649	5.3	
Natalie White	G	Florida A&M (2)	1991	1995	113	624	5.5	
Ticha Penicheiro	G	Old Dominion	1994	1998	133	591	4.4	
Heidi Caruso	G	Lafayette	1990	1994	113	532	4.7	
Shakyla Hill	G	Grambling	2015	2019	130	493	3.8	
Hannah Hidalgo^	G	Notre Dame	2023	present	103	481	4.7	
Angel McCoughtry	F	Louisville	2005	2009	139	481	3.5	
Shiakiea Carter	G	Grambling (2)	1994	1998	116	469	4.0	
Kevi Luper	G	Oral Roberts	2009	2013	126	463	3.7	
Stephanie Karcz	G	Loyola (MD)	2016	2020	119	461	3.9	
Stacy Coffey	G	Oklahoma State	1992	1996	118	458	3.9	
Ny'Ceara Pryor	G	Sacred Heart / Texas A&M	2022	2026	123	454	3.7	
Dawn Staley*	G	Virginia	1988	1992	131	454	3.5	
Toccara Williams	G	Texas A&M (2)	2000	2004	111	452	4.1	
Tuti Jones	G	Belmont	2020	2026 (Note: Jones played in all six seasons of her NCAA career. The NCAA did not count the 2020–21 season, heavily impacted by COVID-19, against the athletic eligibility of any basketball player. She suffered a season-ending injury eight games into the 2022–23 season, qualifying her for an NCAA hardship waiver, popularly known as a "medical redshirt".)	169	449	2.7	
Nykesha Sales	F	UConn	1994	1998	137	447	3.3	
Melanie Boeglin	G	Indiana State	2002	2006	124	444	3.6	
Kyle DeHaven	G	William & Mary / Delaware	2003	2008	118	429	3.6	
Ashley Deary	G	Northwestern	2013	2017	131	429	3.3	
Sherill Baker	G	Georgia	2002	2006	131	426	3.3	
Donna McGary	G	Mississippi Valley State	1987	1991	113	425	3.8	
Chanette Hicks	G	Virginia Tech / Norfolk State	2015	2020 (Note: Although Hicks' career spanned five seasons, she only played in four. She played three seasons at Virginia Tech before transferring to Norfolk State, sitting out the 2018–19 season due to then-current NCAA transfer rules.)	117	425	3.6	
Rochelle Luckett	G	VCU	1998	2002	114	423	3.7	
Demetria Frank	G	Bethune-Cookman	2007	2012	122	422	3.5	
Nicole Kubik	G	Nebraska	1996	2000	125	418	3.3	
