= List of NCAA Division I women's basketball season scoring leaders =

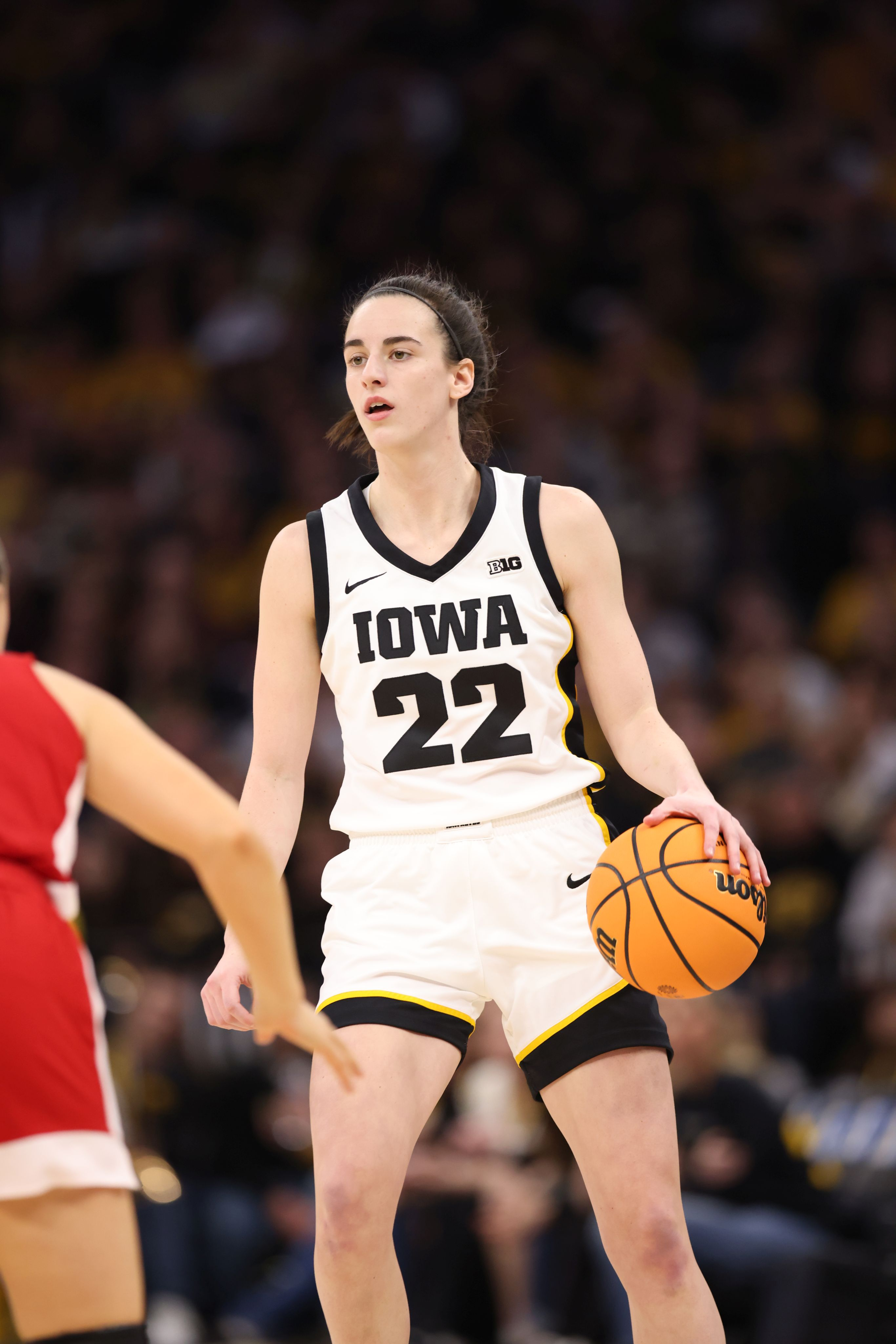
Caitlin Clark led NCAA Division I women's basketball in single-season scoring three times in her career.

In basketball, points are the sum of the score accumulated through free throw or field goal. While the NCAA's current three-division format has been in place since the 1973–74 season, the organization did not sponsor women's sports until the 1981–82 school year; before that time, women's college sports were governed by the Association of Intercollegiate Athletics for Women (AIAW). The NCAA has officially recorded scoring statistics since it first sponsored women's basketball. Official scoring leaders are based solely on per-game average, not total points. While the NCAA maintains a ranked list of players by total points within each season on its official website, it does not include seasonal leaders in total points in its printed record books.

Unlike for men's basketball, the NCAA does not keep records of the top scorers (by total points) for a single season. Records of the top scorer (by average points per game) for each season and scorers with more than 900 points in a season are however available.

Patricia Hoskins holds the single-season scoring record on a per-game basis with a mark of 33.6 points per game (ppg) set in 1988–89, during her senior season at Mississippi Valley State.

The majority of per-game scoring leaders are seniors. In 1983–84, Delta State's Deborah Temple became the first junior to lead NCAA Division I in scoring. The 1995–96 season saw Maine's Cindy Blodgett become the first sophomore and first underclassmen to lead in scoring. Kelsey Mitchell (2014–15) and Caitlin Clark (2020–21) are the only freshmen to lead Division I in scoring.

Clark (2020–21, 2021–22, and 2023–24) is the only player to lead Division I women's basketball in scoring three times. Six other players have led Division I women's basketball in scoring twice. Andrea Congreaves (1991–92 and 1992–93) was the first to accomplish this feat, followed by Blodgett (1995–96 and 1996–97), Jackie Stiles (1999–2000 and 2000–01), Alysha Clark (2008–09 and 2009–10), Jerica Coley (2012–13 and 2013–14), and Megan Gustafson (2017–18 and 2018–19).

In regards to total points, Caitlin Clark currently holds the single-season scoring record for NCAA Division I of 1,234 points, set during her final season at Iowa in 2023–24. She is also the only NCAA Division I women's basketball player who scored more than 1,000 points in more than one season (2022–23 and 2023–24).

In the tables below, all schools are listed with their current athletic brand names, which do not always match those used by a team in the relevant season.

== Key ==
Pos.	G	F	C	PPG	Ref.
Position	Guard	Forward	Center	Points per game	References

Class (Cl.) key
Fr	Freshman	So	Sophomore	Jr	Junior	Sr	Senior

^	Player still competing in NCAA Division I
*	Elected to the Naismith Memorial Basketball Hall of Fame
†	Elected to the Women's Basketball Hall of Fame
Player (X)	Denotes the number of times the player had been the scoring leader up to and including that season

== Season scoring leaders (points per game) ==
Season	Player	Pos.	Cl.	Team	GP	FGM	3PM	FTM	Total points	PPG	Ref.
1981–82	Barbara Kennedy^{†}		Sr	Clemson	31	392	–	124	908	29.3	
1982–83	LaTaunya Pollard		Sr	Long Beach State	31	376	–	155	907	29.3	
1983–84	Deborah Temple		Jr	Delta State	28	373	–	127	873	31.2	
1984–85	Anucha Browne		Sr	Northwestern	28	341	–	173	855	30.5	
1985–86	Wanda Ford		Sr	Drake	30	390	–	139	919	30.6	
1986–87	Tresa Spaulding		Sr	BYU	28	347	–	116	810	28.9	
1987–88	LaChandra Leday		Sr	Grambling	28	334	36	146	850	30.4	
1988–89	Patricia Hoskins		Sr	Mississippi Valley State	27	345	13	205	908	33.6	
1989–90	Kim Perrot		Sr	Louisiana (Note: Known as Southwestern Louisiana before 1999, and later as Louisiana–Lafayette before dropping its geographic identifier from its athletic branding in the 2010s.)	28	309	95	128	841	30.0	
1990–91	Jan Jensen		Sr	Drake	30	358	6	166	888	29.6	
1991–92	Andrea Congreaves		Jr	Mercer	28	353	77	142	925	33.0	
1992–93	Andrea Congreaves (2)		Sr	Mercer	26	302	51	150	805	31.0	
1993–94	Kristy Ryan		Sr	Sacramento State	26	240	2	245	727	28.0	
1994–95	Koko Lahanas		Sr	Cal State Fullerton	29	329	0	120	778	26.8	
1995–96	Cindy Blodgett		So	Maine	32	313	50	213	889	27.8	
1996–97	Cindy Blodgett (2)		Jr	Maine	30	285	69	171	810	27.0	
1997–98	Allison Feaster		Sr	Harvard	28	272	58	195	797	28.5	
1998–99	Tamika Whitmore		Sr	Memphis	32	325	30	163	843	26.3	
1999–2000	Jackie Stiles^{†}	G	Jr	Missouri State (Note: Known before the 2005–06 season as Southwest Missouri State.)	32	297	58	238	890	27.8	
2000–01	Jackie Stiles^{†} (2)	G	Sr	Missouri State	35	365	65	267	1,062	30.3	
2001–02	Kelly Mazzante	G	So	Penn State	35	313	102	144	872	24.9	
2002–03	Chandi Jones		Jr	Houston	28	275	52	168	770	27.5	
2003–04	Emily Faurholt	F	So	Idaho	29	261	43	172	737	25.4	
2004–05	Tan White		Sr	Mississippi State	29	241	61	138	681	23.5	
2005–06	Seimone Augustus	F/G	Sr	LSU	35	334	18	109	795	22.7	
2006–07	Carrie Moore	G	Sr	Western Michigan	32	272	52	217	813	25.4	
2007–08	Amber Holt	G/F	Sr	Middle Tennessee	34	352	20	206	930	27.4	
2008–09	Alysha Clark	F	Jr	Middle Tennessee	34	343	12	237	935	27.5	
2009–10	Alysha Clark (2)	F	Sr	Middle Tennessee	29	306	17	192	821	28.3	
2010–11	Kevi Luper		So	Oral Roberts	34	283	63	177	806	23.7	(Note: ESPN incorrectly lists Maya Moore as the 2010–11 season's scoring leader, with 23.1 points per game (ppg). However, NCAA records and Sports-Reference both list Kevi Luper as Division I's scoring leader with 23.7 ppg.)
2011–12	Elena Delle Donne^{†}^{*}	C	Jr	Delaware	33	325	52	225	927	28.1	
2012–13	Jerica Coley		Jr	FIU	32	299	34	208	840	26.3	
2013–14	Jerica Coley (2)		Sr	FIU	33	345	51	231	972	29.5	
2014–15	Kelsey Mitchell	G	Fr	Ohio State	35	282	127	182	873	24.9	
2015–16	Jasmine Nwajei		Jr	Wagner	29	298	66	179	841	29.0	
2016–17	Kelsey Plum	G	Sr	Washington	35	379	115	236	1,109	31.7	
2017–18	Megan Gustafson	F/C	Jr	Iowa	32	320	0	183	823	25.7	
2018–19	Megan Gustafson (2)	F/C	Sr	Iowa	36	412	1	176	1,001	27.8	
2019–20	Stella Johnson	G	Sr	Rider	30	261	51	172	745	24.8	
2020–21	Caitlin Clark	G	Fr	Iowa	30	266	116	151	799	26.6	
2021–22	Caitlin Clark (2)	G	So	Iowa	32	286	91	200	863	27.0	
2022–23	Maddy Siegrist	F	Sr	Villanova	37	403	52	223	1,081	29.2	
2023–24	Caitlin Clark (3)	G	Sr	Iowa	39	403	201	227	1,234	31.6	
2024–25	Ta'Niya Latson	G	Jr	Florida State	29	255	37	184	731	25.2	
2025–26	Mikayla Blakes^	G	So	Vanderbilt	34	307	93	211	918	27	

== Most points in a season (>900 points) ==
Season	Player	Pos.	Cl.	Team	Games played	Field goals made	3-point field goals made	Free throws made	Total points	PPG	Ref.
2023–24	Caitlin Clark	G	Sr	Iowa	39	403	201	227	1,234	31.6	
2016–17	Kelsey Plum (2)	G	Sr	Washington	35	379	115	236	1,109	31.7	
2022–23	Maddy Siegrist	F	Sr	Villanova	37	403	52	223	1,081	29.2	
2000–01	Jackie Stiles^{†}	G	Sr	Missouri State	35	365	65	267	1,062	30.3	
2022–23	Caitlin Clark (2)	G	Jr	Iowa	38	338	140	239	1,055	27.8	
2013–14	Odyssey Sims	G	Sr	Baylor	37	362	98	232	1,054	28.5	
2018–19	Megan Gustafson	F	Sr	Iowa	36	412	1	176	1,001	27.8	
1986–87	Cindy Brown	F/C	Sr	Long Beach State	35	362	—	250	974	27.8	
2013–14	Jerica Coley	G	Sr	FIU	33	345	51	231	972	29.5	
1990–91	Genia Miller	C	Sr	Cal State Fullerton	33	376	0	217	969	29.4	
2013–14	Chiney Ogwumike	F	Sr	Stanford	37	402	4	159	967	26.1	
2015–16	Kelsey Plum	G	Jr	Washington	37	308	78	266	960	25.9	
1992–93	Sheryl Swoopes^{†}^{*}	G/F	Sr	Texas Tech	34	356	32	211	955	28.1	
2008–09	Alysha Clark	F	Jr	Middle Tennessee	34	343	12	237	935	27.5	
2007–08	Amber Holt	G/F	Sr	Middle Tennessee	34	352	20	206	930	27.4	
2011–12	Brittney Griner	C	Jr	Baylor	40	358	1	212	929	23.2	
2011–12	Elena Delle Donne^{†}^{*}	F	Jr	Delaware	33	325	52	225	927	28.1	
1991–92	Andrea Congreaves	F/C	Jr	Mercer	28	353	77	142	925	33.0	
2023–24	JuJu Watkins^	G	Fr	USC	34	306	67	241	920	27.2	
1985–86	Wanda Ford	F	Sr	Drake	30	390	—	139	919	30.6	
2025–26	Mikayla Blakes^	G	So	Vanderbilt	34	307	93	211	918	27	
1997–98	Chamique Holdsclaw^{†}^{*}	F	Jr	Tennessee	39	370	9	166	915	23.5	
2015–16	Rachel Banham	G	Sr	Minnesota	32	315	119	165	914	28.6	
2009–10	Andrea Riley	G	Sr	Oklahoma State	34	296	78	239	909	26.7	
1981–82	Barbara Kennedy^{†}	...	Sr	Clemson	31	392	—	124	908	29.3	
1988–89	Patricia Hoskins	F	Sr	Mississippi Valley State	27	345	13	205	908	33.6	

== Multiple-time leaders ==
Rank	Player	Team	Times leader	Years
1	Caitlin Clark	Iowa	3	2020–21, 2021–22, 2023–24
2	Cindy Blodgett	Maine	2	1995–96, 1996–97
2	Alysha Clark	Middle Tennessee	2	2008–09, 2009–10
2	Jerica Coley	FIU	2	2012–13, 2013–14
2	Andrea Congreaves	Mercer	2	1991–92, 1992–93
2	Megan Gustafson	Iowa	2	2017–18, 2018–19
