= Emily Faurholt =

Personal information
- Born: April 30, 1984 (age 42) Kennewick, Washington, U.S.
- Listed height: 5 ft 11 in (1.80 m)

Career information
- High school: Kennewick (Kennewick, Washington)
- College: Seattle Pacific (2002–2003); Idaho (2003–2006)
- Position: Forward

Career highlights
- WBCA All-American (2004); Big West Player of the Year (2004); 2× First-team All-Big West (2004, 2005); NCAA season scoring leader (2004)

Emily Sann (née Faurholt; born April 30, 1984) is an American former basketball player. After playing her first year in college at Seattle Pacific University, she transferred to Idaho. At Idaho, she led NCAA Division I women's basketball in scoring in 2004, en route to setting several school records.

== High school career ==
Sann played high school basketball at her hometown Kennewick High School. She led the Kennewick Lions to a state championship in 2000. Sann also helped lead the Lions to 56 consecutive wins en route to being named the Class 4A state player of the year as a senior.

== College career ==
Undersized for a forward, Sann was largely ignored by recruits coming out of high school. She played Division II basketball during her freshman year at Seattle Pacific University. After a year with the Falcons, Sann transferred to the University of Idaho, where she played for the Vandals.

In her first game with Idaho, she scored 29 points. As a sophomore, she averaged 25.4 points per game, finishing the season as NCAA Division I's women's scoring leader. She was named the Big West Conference's Player of the Year, and was also named an All-Big West First Team selection.

In her junior season, she surpassed 1,000 total points. She reached the milestone in 43 games, tied for ninth-fastest in NCAA history at the time. She finished the season averaging 23.3 points per game. She was named to her second All-Big West Conference First Team, and additionally was named to the All-Big West Tournament Team.

She finished her college career as Idaho's all-time leading scorer, with 1,938 total points. Her 22.0 scoring average remains Idaho's all-time record.

She was inducted into the Vandal Athletics Hall of Fame in 2018. Sann was also inducted into the North Idaho Athletic Hall of Fame in 2022, after originally being scheduled to be inducted in 2020. Also in 2020, The Spokesman-Review ranked Sann as the fourth-best Idaho athlete since 2000.

== College statistics ==
Legend
	Led Division I
**Bold**	Career best

Year	Team	GP	GS	MPG	FG%	3P%	FT%	RPG	APG	SPG	BPG	TO	PPG
2002–03	Seattle Pacific	28	–	27.0	.462	–	**.816**	5.6	1.0	1.0	.2	**2.1**	11.1
2003–04	Idaho	29	–	37.5	**.489**	**.402**	.804	**6.7**	1.7	**1.5**	**.8**	3.2	**25.4**
2004–05	Idaho	**30**	–	**38.3**	.440	.354	.748	5.9	1.4	1.1	.2	3.3	23.3
2005–06	Idaho	29	–	38.0	.425	.354	.814	4.8	**1.8**	1.1	.1	2.9	17.4
**Div. I Career**		88	–	37.9	.453	.369	.784	5.8	1.6	1.2	.4	3.1	22.0

== Post-basketball ==
After college, she signed up to play for a team in Spain, but left early. Deciding to retire from basketball, Sann began teaching yoga and traveling.

== Personal life ==
While teaching yoga in New York, she met her husband Jim Sann. The two married in 2016 and have two children together. Jim has served on the coaching staffs of the New York Knicks, Houston Rockets, Chicago Bulls, Brooklyn Nets, and Toronto Raptors.

== See also ==
- List of NCAA Division I women's basketball season scoring leaders
