= List of NCAA Division I women's basketball career rebounding leaders =

In basketball, a rebound is the act of gaining possession of the ball after a missed field goal or free throw. The top 25 players in career rebounds in National Collegiate Athletic Association (NCAA) Division I women's basketball history are listed below. While the NCAA's current three-division format has been in place since the 1973–74 season, the organization did not sponsor women's sports until the 1981–82 school year; before that time, women's college sports were governed by the Association of Intercollegiate Athletics for Women (AIAW). The NCAA has officially recorded rebounding statistics since it first sponsored women's basketball.

To be listed in the NCAA record book, a player must have been active in at least three seasons during the era in which the NCAA governed women's sports—although for those players who qualify for inclusion in the record book, AIAW statistics are included.

The all-time leading rebounder in Division I history is Courtney Paris of Oklahoma, who recorded 2,034 rebounds from 2005–06 to 2008–09, making her the only D-I women's player to date to surpass the 2,000-rebound mark.

The only player on this list to be enshrined in the Naismith Memorial Basketball Hall of Fame is Cheryl Miller; Sylvia Fowles will officially enter the Hall on September 6, 2025.

Two listed players competed in college basketball for more than the standard four seasons. Lauren Gustin and Elizabeth Kitley both played from 2019–20 to 2023–24, benefiting from the NCAA's blanket waiver that did not count the 2020–21 season, heavily impacted by the public response to COVID-19, against the athletic eligibility of any basketball player. Gustin played her first college season at Salt Lake Community College before transferring to BYU, while Kitley played her entire college career at Virginia Tech. (Note: Angel Reese was eligible for the COVID waiver, but chose to declare for the 2024 WNBA draft instead of playing a fifth college season.)

Four players among the top 25 played at more than one NCAA Division I school: Aneesah Morrow at DePaul and LSU, Ruvanna Campbell at La Salle and UIC, Tracy Claxton at Kansas and Old Dominion, and Angel Reese at Maryland and LSU.

== Key ==
Pos.	G	F	C	Ref.
Position	Guard	Forward	Center	References

*	Elected to the Naismith Memorial Basketball Hall of Fame
Team (X)	Denotes the number of times a player from that team appears on the list

== Top 25 career rebounding leaders ==
Current through the end of the 2024–25 season.

Player	Pos.	Team(s)	Career start (Note: Reflects the calendar year in which the player's Division I career began. All listings of player records in official NCAA record books categorize seasons by the calendar years in which they ended.)	Career end	Games played	Rebounds	RPG	Ref. (Note: Except as otherwise noted, references for each entry are cited in the "General references" section below. Specifically: Games played and total points are available from the most recent edition of the NCAA Division I women's basketball record book.; More detailed statistics are available by searching for the named player in the NCAA women's basketball statistical database. Enter the player's name (last name required, first name optional), make sure that the "Player" option is specified, and click on the appropriate entry returned.)
Courtney Paris	C	Oklahoma	2005	2009	137	2,034	14.8	
Wanda Ford	C	Drake	1982	1986	117	1,815	15.5	
Aneesah Morrow	F	DePaul / LSU	2021	2025	139	1,714	12.3	
Jillian Alleyne	F	Oregon	2009	2013	120	1,712	14.3	
Lauren Gustin	F	BYU	2020	2024	119	1,693	14.2	
Patricia Hoskins	F	Mississippi Valley State	1985	1989	110	1,662	15.1	
Joy Adams	F	Iona	2012	2016	130	1,590	12.2	
Sylvia Fowles*	C	LSU (2)	2004	2008	144	1,570	10.9	
Chiney Ogwumike	F	Stanford	2010	2014	145	1,567	10.8	
Artemis Spanou	F	Robert Morris	2010	2014	124	1,563	12.6	
Ta'Shia Phillips	C	Xavier	2004	2008	131	1,552	11.8	
Cheryl Miller*	F	USC	1982	1986	128	1,534	12	
Cheryl Taylor	F	Tennessee Tech	1983 (Note: The NCAA record book lists Taylor's first season as 1982–83. However, Tennessee Tech basketball media guides list her first season as 1983–84. This page will follow Tennessee Tech's reckoning.)	1987	120	1,532	12.8	
Reyna Frost	F	Central Michigan	2015	2019	133	1,526	11.5	
Marilyn Stephens	F	Temple	1980	1984	117	1,519	13	
Ruvanna Campbell	F	La Salle / UIC	2011	2016 (Note: Campbell's college career spanned five seasons, but she only played in four. After her 2011–12 freshman season at La Salle, she transferred to UIC, sitting out the 2012–13 season due to then-current NCAA transfer rules.)	125	1,506	12	
Elizabeth Kitley	C	Virginia Tech	2019	2024	151	1,506	10	
Teaira McCowan	C	Mississippi State	2015	2019	149	1,502	10.1	
Aliyah Boston	F/C	South Carolina	2019	2023	138	1,493	10.8	
Olivia Bradley	F	West Virginia	1981	1985	117	1,484	12.7	
Megan Gustafson	C	Iowa	2015	2019	135	1,460	10.8	
Judy Mosley	C	Hawaiʻi	1986	1990	118	1,434	12.2	
Tracy Claxton	F	Kansas / Old Dominion	1980 (Note: The NCAA record book disagrees with media guides for both of Claxton's schools regarding the first season of her career. The NCAA record book lists 1981–82 as her first season, while media guides for both Kansas and Old Dominion state 1980–81. This page will defer to the Kansas and Old Dominion media guides on this issue. Also, while Claxton's college career spanned five seasons, she only played in four, sitting out the 1982–83 season due to NCAA rules after transferring from Kansas to Old Dominion.)	1985	118	1,434	12.2	
Angel Reese	F	Maryland / LSU (3)	2020	2024	118	1,426	12.1	
Channon Fluker	C	Cal State Northridge	2015	2019	125	1,425	11.4	
