= Jasmine Nwajei =

Nigerian basketball player

No. 16 – First Bank BC
- Position: Shooting guard
- League: ZWBL

Personal information
- Born: 2 February 1995 (age 31) Rockaway Park, New York, U.S.
- Listed height: 1.73 m (5 ft 8 in)

Career information
- High school: Murry Bergtraum High School (New York)
- College: Syracuse (2018)
- WNBA draft: 2018: undrafted

Career highlights
- 2x First-team All-NEC (2015, 2016); NEC All-Defensive Team (2015); NEC Freshman of the Year (2014); NCAA season scoring leader (2016)
Medals
Women's basketball
Representing Nigeria
AfroBasket
Gold medal – first place	2019 Senegal

Jasmine Nwajei (born 2 February 1995) is a Nigerian basketball player for First Bank BC and the Nigerian national team.

She represented Nigeria at the 2019 Women's Afrobasket.

== Career statistics ==
=== College ===
Year	Team	GP	GS	MPG	FG%	3P%	FT%	RPG	APG	SPG	BPG	TO	PPG
2013–14	Wagner	29	27	32.0	38.0	23.3	54.0	5.9	4.6	1.7	0.2	6.0	17.8
2014–15	Wagner	29	29	34.4	37.2	27.2	68.9	6.2	3.9	3.3	0.2	5.7	24.8
2015–16	Wagner	29	29	36.6	38.0	24.8	68.8	6.1	3.7	2.6	0.3	6.0	*29.0
2016–17	Syracuse	Did not play due to injury											
2017–18	Syracuse	30	0	8.9	43.5	29.2	68.4	1.9	0.5	0.6	0.0	0.5	2.7
Career		117	85	27.8	37.9	25.4	64.9	5.0	3.1	2.0	0.2	4.5	18.4
Statistics retrieved from Sports-Reference.
