= Jennifer Butler =

American basketball player

Personal information
- Born: April 21, 1981 (age 45) Brooklyn, New York, U.S.
- Listed height: 6 ft 3 in (1.91 m)

Career information
- High school: Murry Bergtraum (New York City, New York)
- College: UMass (1999–2003)
- WNBA draft: 2003: 2nd round, 15th overall pick
- Drafted by: Cleveland Rockers
- Position: Center

Career highlights
- NCAA season rebounding leader (2003)
- Stats at Basketball Reference

Jennifer Ruth Butler (born April 21, 1981) is an American basketball player who was selected by the Cleveland Rockers in the 2003 WNBA draft. She is the first player from UMass to be drafted by a WNBA franchise.

== Massachusetts statistics ==
Legend
GP	Games played	GS	Games started	MPG	Minutes per game	FG%	Field goal percentage	3P%	3-point field goal percentage
FT%	Free throw percentage	RPG	Rebounds per game	APG	Assists per game	SPG	Steals per game	BPG	Blocks per game
TO	Turnovers per game	PPG	Points per game	**Bold**	Career high	*	Led Division I

Ratios
Year	Team	GP	FG%	3P%	FT%	RBG	APG	BPG	SPG	PPG
1999-00	Massachusetts	28	**48.3%**	–	44.0%	10.50	0.79	0.89	1.89	8.89
2000–01	Massachusetts	28	39.3%	0.0%	57.9%	9.60	0.80	1.20	2.10	12.70
2001–02	Massachusetts	**30**	43.4%	–	51.7%	11.77	0.87	**1.50**	2.00	13.20
2002–03	Massachusetts	28	46.0%	–	**62.1%**	***14.71**	**1.89**	1.25	**2.43**	**17.46**
Career		114	44.0%	0.0%	55.2%	11.65	1.08	1.22	2.10	13.07

Totals
Year	Team	GP	FG	FGA	3P	3PA	FT	FTA	REB	A	BK	ST	PTS
1999-00	Massachusetts	28	99	205	–	–	51	116	294	22	25	53	249
2000–01	Massachusetts	28	125	318	0	1	106	183	269	22	34	58	356
2001–02	Massachusetts	**30**	152	350	0	1	92	178	353	26	**45**	60	396
2002–03	Massachusetts	28	**179**	**389**	0	0	**131**	**211**	**412**	**53**	35	**68**	**489**
Career		114	555	1262	0	2	380	688	1328	123	139	239	1490
