= Kevi Luper =

American basketball player (born 1990)

Personal information
- Born: July 6, 1990 (age 36) Tahlequah, Oklahoma
- Listed height: 5 ft 10 in (1.78 m)

Career information
- High school: Adair High School
- College: Oral Roberts (2010–2013)
- Position: Guard
- Number: 15

Career highlights
- Southland tournament MVP (2013); Southland All-Defensive Team (2013); First-team All-Southland (2013); 3x Summit Player of the Year (2010–2012); 2x Summit Defensive Player of the Year (2010, 2011); Summit Freshman of the Year (2010); 3x First-team All-Summit (2010–2012); Summit All-Freshman Team (2010); NCAA season scoring leader (2011)

Kevi Lee Luper (born July 6, 1990) is an American women's basketball player, who starred at the collegiate level for Oral Roberts University. Luper was born in Tahlequah, Oklahoma. She is a citizen of the Cherokee Nation. Luper graduated from Adair High School. She was the first ever woman to lead the NCAA Division I in both points and steals during the 2010–11 season. In 2019, Oral Roberts retired Luper's jersey number and inducted her into the school's Hall of Fame.

She competed for the United States women's national basketball team at the 2011 Pan American Games.

== College statistics ==
Legend
GP	Games played	GS	Games started	MPG	Minutes per game	FG%	Field goal percentage	3P%	3-point field goal percentage
FT%	Free throw percentage	RPG	Rebounds per game	APG	Assists per game	SPG	Steals per game	BPG	Blocks per game
TO	Turnovers per game	PPG	Points per game	**Bold**	Career high	*	Led Division I

Year	Team	GP	Points	FG%	3P%	FT%	RPG	APG	SPG	BPG	PPG
2009–10	Oral Roberts	31	757	**.462**	.301	.826	**5.2**	**2.4**	**4.5**	0.3	**24.4**
2010–11	Oral Roberts	**34**	**806**	.440	.384	**.843**	4.7	0.9	3.7	0.2	*23.7
2011–12	Oral Roberts	30	714	**.462**	**.387**	.857	3.8	2.0	3.8	0.3	23.8
2012–13	Oral Roberts	31	590	.440	.383	.875	3.8	1.6	2.7	**1.0**	19.0
Career		126	2,867	.451	.362	.844	4.4	1.7	3.7	0.4	22.8

== See also ==
- List of NCAA Division I women's basketball career scoring leaders
- List of NCAA Division I women's basketball career steals leaders
- List of NCAA Division I women's basketball season scoring leaders
