= Koko Lahanas =

Former American Basketball Player

Personal information
- Listed height: 6 ft 0 in (1.83 m)

Career information
- High school: Carondelet (Concord, California)
- College: Diablo Valley College; Los Medanos College; Cal State Fullerton (1993–1995)
- Position: Forward

Career highlights
- First-team All-Big West (1995); NCAA season scoring leader (1995)

Catherine "Koko" Lahanas is an American former basketball player. She played college basketball at Cal State Fullerton, where she led NCAA Division I women's basketball in scoring in 1994–95.

== Early life ==
Born Catherine Lahanas, she goes by "Koko", a nickname given to her by her father. Lahanas and her brother, Niko were both swimmers. Koko ranked among the top eight 100-meter freestyle specialists in the nation in the 13-14 age group. Her brother would become an All-American swimmer at California.

== High school ==
Koko and Niko played street ball growing up, which led her to play basketball during her freshman year at Carondelet High School. She spent her high school years torn between swimming and basketball, partaking in the former during her sophomore and junior years, but returning to the latter in her senior season. She averaged 25 points and 10 rebounds per game in her senior year.

== College career ==
Still not ready to make a decision on which sport to fully pursue after high school, she opted to attend Diablo Valley College, where she swam. As the school did not have a basketball team, she was permitted to play for nearby Los Medanos College. For her play at Los Medanos, Lahanas was inducted into the California Community College Women's Basketball Coaches Association Hall of Fame in 2000. Deborah Ayres coached in the same conference as Los Medanos, at Solano College from 1990 to 1992. Later, as Cal State Fullerton's head coach, she offered Lahanas a scholarship in 1993.

During her senior season, Lahanas set numerous school records. On December 19, 1994, against Northern Arizona, she made a Fullerton-record 18 field goals. She matched this mark with another 18 field goals made on January 8, 1995, this time against UNLV.

On February 14, 1995, Lahanas scored 48 points in a 103–78 win over Cal Poly San Luis Obispo. The scoring output set a school record. It was Lahanas' second 40-point game of the season. On February 26, Lahanas scored 31 as she led Fullerton to an upset win over UC Santa Barbara.

Lahanas finished her senior season averaging 26.8 points per game (ppg), which led Division I women's basketball. As a senior, she was named to the Big West Conference's women's basketball All-Tournament team, and was also a first-team All-Big West selection.

== Career statistics ==
Legend
GP	Games played	GS	Games started	MPG	Minutes per game	FG%	Field goal percentage	3P%	3-point field goal percentage
FT%	Free throw percentage	RPG	Rebounds per game	APG	Assists per game	SPG	Steals per game	BPG	Blocks per game
TO	Turnovers per game	PPG	Points per game	**Bold**	Career high	*	Led Division I

=== College ===
Year	Team	GP	GS	MPG	FG%	3P%	FT%	RPG	APG	SPG	BPG	TO	PPG
1993–94	Cal State Fullerton	27	-	-	49.3	0.0	70.0	5.4	0.5	0.9	0.1	-	6.3
1994–95	Cal State Fullerton	**29**	-	-	**58.0**	0.0	**71.9**	**10.3**	**0.9**	**2.5**	**0.3**	-	**26.8***
**Career**		56	-	-	56.3	0.0	71.5	7.9	0.7	1.7	0.2	-	16.9
Statistics retrieved from Sports-Reference.

== Professional career ==
In January 1996, Lahanas signed to play for the Hobart Islanders of the Australian-based Women's National Basketball League.

== See also ==
- List of NCAA Division I women's basketball season scoring leaders
