= 2023–24 NCAA Division I women's basketball season =

- Preseason AP No. 1: LSU Tigers
- Regular season: November 6, 2023 – March 17, 2024
- NCAA Tournament: 2024
- Tournament dates: March 20 – April 7
- National Championship: Rocket Mortgage FieldHouse; Cleveland, Ohio
- NCAA Champions: South Carolina Gamecocks
- Other champions: Illinois Fighting Illini (WBIT); Saint Louis Billikens (WNIT)
- Player of the Year (Naismith, Wooden): Caitlin Clark, Iowa Hawkeyes

The 2023–24 NCAA Division I women's basketball season began on November 6, 2023. The regular season ended on March 17, 2024, with the 2024 NCAA Division I women's basketball tournament beginning on March 20 and ended with the championship game at Rocket Mortgage FieldHouse in Cleveland, Ohio, on April 7.

This season was the first for the Women's Basketball Invitation Tournament, a secondary national tournament operated by the NCAA as a direct parallel to the men's National Invitation Tournament.

== Rule changes ==
On May 5, 2023, the NCAA Basketball Rules Committee proposed a suite of rule changes for the 2023–24 season. These changes were approved by the Playing Rules Oversight Panel during its June 8 conference call:

- Players judged to have flopped are warned on the first offense, with a technical foul to be issued for subsequent offenses. All flop calls after the first are added to the team foul count, but not to the individual players' foul counts.
- Flopping and delay of game were established as a new class of technical fouls assessed to the team and not to individuals.
- The restricted-area arc within the free-throw lane was reduced from an arc 4 feet (1.22 m) from the center of the basket to the area directly under the basket. Defenders can now draw charges at any location other than directly under the basket.
- Prerecorded or live video can be transmitted to the bench area during the game, on an optional basis. This had been an experimental rule since 2021–22, but is now permanent.
- The shot clock resets to 20 seconds for all offensive rebounds when the original shot has touched the rim.
- Red and amber lights can now be placed on the backboard.
- Schools no longer need to apply for a waiver to allow players to use religious headwear that is safe for competition.
- All numbers from 0–99 are now allowed. Previously, player numbers could only include digits from 0 to 5.

== Season headlines ==
- July 17, 2023
  - The NCAA announced the creation of the Women's Basketball Invitation Tournament (WBIT), a secondary 32-team national tournament that directly parallels the men's National Invitation Tournament.
  - Triple Crown Sports, which owns and operates the Women's National Invitation Tournament (WNIT), responded to the WBIT announcement by reducing the WNIT field from 64 to 48 teams, effective immediately.
- October 4 – The Division I Council announced changes to the transfer window for all sports. In men's and women's basketball, the transfer portal now opens on the day after Selection Sunday and remains open for 45 days, down from the previous 60.
- October 15 – Iowa held Crossover at Kinnick, an exhibition game at the school's football home of Kinnick Stadium. The Hawkeyes defeated DePaul 94–72 in front of a crowd of 55,646, the largest documented attendance in history for a women's basketball game.
- October 23 – The Metro Atlantic Athletic Conference announced that Merrimack and Sacred Heart would join from the Northeast Conference (NEC) in July 2024.
- October 24 – The AP released its preseason All-America team. Reigning national player of the year Caitlin Clark of Iowa was the only unanimous choice, joined by forwards Angel Reese of LSU, Cameron Brink of Stanford, and Mackenzie Holmes of Indiana; center Elizabeth Kitley of Virginia Tech; and guard Paige Bueckers of UConn. The team had six players instead of the normal five because Holmes and Kitley tied in voting for the fifth spot.
- October 27 – The NCAA announced that effective immediately, the top overall seed in the Division I tournament would be placed in a regional pod playing on Friday and Sunday. This assures that team of the most possible rest time between the regional final and the Final Four, assuming that it advances to that point.
- November 28 – Conference USA announced that Delaware would join from the Coastal Athletic Association in 2025.
- December 5 – The NEC announced that Chicago State, the only Division I independent, would join the conference in July 2024.
- December 20 – The two schools left behind in the mass exodus from the Pac-12, Oregon State and Washington State, were reported to be nearing a deal with the West Coast Conference (WCC) for affiliate membership in multiple sports, including men's and women's basketball. The arrangement, expected to be voted on by WCC member presidents in the coming days, would run for two years (through 2025–26), during which time the so-called "Pac-2" would be eligible for WCC championships and could represent the conference in NCAA championship events.
- December 22 – The reported deal between the "Pac-2" and the WCC became official, with Oregon State and Washington State joining as affiliate members in all non-football sports apart from baseball through 2025–26.
- February 16, 2024 – During UConn's senior night ceremony, Bueckers announced that she would return for the 2024–25 season. She was eligible for the WNBA draft, in which she was projected as a lottery pick, as a redshirt junior.
- February 29
  - Clark announced she would declare for the WNBA draft. She was also eligible to return to college in 2024–25.
  - The Mid-American Conference (MAC) announced that UMass would leave the Atlantic 10 Conference for the MAC in 2025–26.
- March 25 – The Southland Conference announced that UTRGV would join from the Western Athletic Conference on July 1, 2024.
- April 4 – The NEC announced that Mercyhurst, a member of the Division II Pennsylvania State Athletic Conference, would start a transition to Division I and join the NEC on July 1, 2024.
- April 17 – The United States Basketball Writers Association announced that its annual award for the top D-I women's head coach would be renamed as the Geno Auriemma Award starting in 2024–25.

=== Milestones and records ===
==== Caitlin Clark ====
- November 12 – Clark joined Sabrina Ionescu as the only Division I players to collect a triple-double in four different seasons, recording 24 points, 10 rebounds and 11 assists in Iowa's 94–53 blowout of Northern Iowa. Clark also surpassed Megan Gustafson as Iowa's all-time scoring leader.
- December 6 – Clark became the 15th Division I women's player with 3,000 career points after a 35-point performance in Iowa's 67–58 win at Iowa State. She also became the first D-I player, male or female, with 3,000 points, 750 rebounds and 750 assists.
- December 30 – Clark passed Ohio State's Samantha Prahalis as the career assists leader in the Big Ten Conference during Iowa's 94–71 win against Minnesota.
- January 31, 2024 – Clark became the all-time scoring leader in Big Ten history, passing Ohio State's Kelsey Mitchell, during Iowa's 110–74 win at Northwestern. This also put Clark in second place on the Division I women's career scoring list, behind Kelsey Plum of Washington.
- February 11 – Clark became the sixth Division I player with 1,000 career assists, reaching the milestone during Iowa's 82–79 loss at Nebraska.
- February 15 – Clark surpassed Plum as the D-I career scoring leader with a long three-pointer less than 3 minutes into Iowa's home game against Michigan. She finished with a program-record 49 points, with Iowa winning 106–89.
- February 28 – In Iowa's 108–60 blowout of Minnesota, Clark reached three major milestones:
  - She passed Lynette Woodard, whose career at Kansas from 1977 to 1981 predated NCAA sponsorship of women's sports, as the career scoring leader in major-college women's basketball.
  - Clark became the all-time Division I women's leader for three-pointers in a season. Her 156 threes at this point in the season put her past Taylor Pierce, who had 154 for Idaho in the 2018–19 season.
  - She became the second Division I women's player with 500 career three-pointers, after Taylor Robertson of Oklahoma from 2018 to 2023, and also passed Mitchell as the Big Ten career leader.
- March 3 – In Iowa's last regular-season game, and also the last regular-season game of her college career, Clark surpassed the career total of D-I men's scoring leader Pete Maravich shortly before halftime of the Hawkeyes' 93–83 win over Ohio State.
- March 8 – In the quarterfinals of the Big Ten tournament, Clark, who in her previous game had drawn level with Stephen Curry and Darius McGhee for the most three-pointers by any Division I player in a single season, surpassed both in Iowa's 95–62 win over Penn State, finishing the game with 164 this season.
- March 9 – In Iowa's 95–68 win over Michigan in the Big Ten semifinals, Clark became the first player in D-I women's history to score at least 1,000 points in two different seasons, having done so in 2022–23. She also passed Mitchell as the all-time leading scorer in Big Ten tournament history.
- March 25 – Clark's 32 points in Iowa's 64–54 win over West Virginia in the second round of the NCAA tournament put her past Plum for the most points in a single season in D-I women's history.
- April 1 – In a rematch of the 2023 championship game, Clark's 41 points, including nine three-pointers, led Iowa to a 94–87 win over LSU in the Region 2 final, giving the Hawkeyes a second straight Final Four berth. In the process, Clark tied the record for most threes in an NCAA tournament game and became the D-I women's career leader in threes, passing the aforementioned Taylor Robertson. Clark also set NCAA women's tournament records for career assists and threes.
- April 7 – Following Clark's final college game, Iowa's 87–75 loss to South Carolina in the 2024 national championship game, she reached the following season or career milestones:
  - Division I women's record career scoring average of 28.42 points per game, fractionally ahead of the previous record by Mississippi Valley State's Patricia Hoskins (28.38).
  - First D-I player, male or female, with 200 three-pointers in a season (201).
  - First D-I women's player to average 5 threes in a season (5.15), passing Pierce's previous record.
  - Career leader in points (491) in D-I women's tournament history.

==== Other milestones and records ====
- January 14, 2024 – Syracuse's Dyaisha Fair became the 16th D-I women's player with 3,000 career points, reaching the milestone in the Orange's 83–82 win over Clemson. Fair played three seasons at Buffalo before transferring to Syracuse in 2022.
- January 21 – Tara VanDerveer became the winningest head coach in Division I history, recording her 1,203rd career win in Stanford's 65–56 win over Oregon State. The win put her ahead of retired Duke men's coach Mike Krzyzewski on the D-I career wins list.
- April 1 – In UConn's 80–73 win over USC in the Region 3 final of the NCAA tournament, USC's JuJu Watkins set a new Division I single-season freshman scoring record. Her 29 points gave her 920 for the season, passing previous leader Tina Hutchinson of San Diego State, who had set the record in 1983–84.

== Conference membership changes ==
Nineteen schools joined new conferences, became independents, or dropped athletics.

School	Former conference	New conference
BYU	WCC	Big 12
Campbell	Big South	CAA
Charlotte	CUSA	American
Cincinnati	American	Big 12
Florida Atlantic	CUSA	American
Hartford	Independent	CCC (Note: Then known as the Commonwealth Coast Conference; renamed as the Conference of New England in August 2024.) (D-III)
Houston	American	Big 12
Jacksonville State	ASUN	CUSA
Le Moyne	NE-10 (D-II)	NEC
Liberty	ASUN	CUSA
New Mexico State	WAC	CUSA
North Texas	CUSA	American
Rice	CUSA	American
St. Francis Brooklyn	NEC	None (dropped athletics)
Sam Houston	WAC	CUSA
UAB	CUSA	American
UCF	American	Big 12
UTSA	CUSA	American
Western Illinois	Summit	OVC

The 2023−24 season was the last for 20 Division I schools in their current conferences and at least two Division II schools in their current conferences before reclassification to Division I. It was also the last season for Chicago State as the only Division I independent.

School	2023−24 conference	Future conference
Arizona	Pac-12	Big 12
Arizona State	Pac-12	Big 12
California	Pac-12	ACC
Chicago State	Independent	NEC
Colorado	Pac-12	Big 12
Kennesaw State	ASUN	CUSA
Mercyhurst	PSAC (D-II)	NEC
Merrimack	NEC	MAAC
Oklahoma	Big 12	SEC
Oregon	Pac-12	Big Ten
Oregon State	Pac-12 (Note: The Pac-12 continues to technically exist with Oregon State and Washington State as the only members. It will resume play in 2026–27 with the arrival of seven new members.)	WCC
Sacred Heart	NEC	MAAC
SMU	American	ACC
Stanford	Pac-12	ACC
Stephen F. Austin	WAC	Southland
Texas	Big 12	SEC
UCLA	Pac-12	Big Ten
USC	Pac-12	Big Ten
Utah	Pac-12	Big 12
UTRGV	WAC	Southland
Washington	Pac-12	Big Ten
Washington State	Pac-12	WCC
West Georgia	Gulf South (D-II)	ASUN

== Arenas ==
=== New arenas ===
- Austin Peay left the on-campus Winfield Dunn Center for the new F&M Bank Arena in downtown Clarksville, Tennessee after 49 seasons. The new arena opened on July 15, 2023. The first basketball event was a joint practice by the men's and women's teams on October 26. The first official games consisted of a men's and women's doubleheader on November 6, with the women losing 75–59 to Division II Trevecca Nazarene in the first game.
- Baylor left the Ferrell Center for the new Foster Pavilion. The Bears' first game in the new arena was a 71–50 win over TCU on January 3, 2024, a day after the arena opened with the Baylor men defeating Cornell 98–79.
- Georgia Southern will leave the Hanner Fieldhouse for the new Jack and Ruth Ann Hill Convocation Center. The venue was scheduled to open in the early fall of 2023, but was delayed until 2024–25 season.
- Longwood left Willett Hall for the new Joan Perry Brock Center; the venue opened on August 25, 2023. The team played its first game there on November 11, 2023, against St. Mary's of Maryland.
- Vermont was originally slated to open the new Tarrant Event Center, the replacement for Patrick Gym, in 2021. However, the new arena has since been placed on indefinite hold. Construction was initially halted by COVID-19. With the Tarrant Center being part of a much larger upgrade of UVM's athletic and recreation facilities, UVM chose to prioritize a new student recreation center. Construction of the Tarrant Center is now being hampered by increased borrowing costs.

== Seasonal outlook ==
The Top 25 from the AP and USA Today Coaching polls.

=== Pre-season polls ===
AP
Ranking	Team
1	LSU (35)
2	UConn (1)
3	Iowa
4	UCLA
5	Utah
6	South Carolina
7	Ohio State
8	Virginia Tech
9	Indiana
10	Notre Dame
11	Tennessee
12	Ole Miss
13	Texas
14	Maryland
15	Stanford
16	North Carolina
17	Louisville
18	Florida State
19	Baylor
20	Colorado
21	USC
22	Creighton
23	Illinois
24	Washington State
25	Mississippi State

USA Today Coaches
Ranking	Team
1	LSU (29)
2	UConn (3)
3	Iowa
4	South Carolina
5	Virginia Tech
6	Ohio State
7	Utah
8	UCLA
9	Indiana
10	Notre Dame
11	Maryland
12	Tennessee
13	Stanford
14	Texas
15	Louisville
16	Ole Miss
17	North Carolina
18	Colorado
19	Duke
20	Baylor
21	USC
22	Florida State
23	Oklahoma
24	Michigan т
25	Miami (FL) т

=== Final polls ===
AP
Ranking	Team
1	South Carolina (35)
2	Iowa
3	UConn
4	NC State
5	USC
6	LSU
7	Texas
8	Oregon State
9	Stanford
10	UCLA
11	Notre Dame
12	Indiana
13	Baylor
14	Gonzaga
15	Colorado
16	Ohio State
17	Duke
18	Virginia Tech
19	Kansas State
20	Syracuse
21	Oklahoma
22	Utah
23	Creighton
24	West Virginia
25	Iowa State

USA Today Coaches
Ranking	Team
1	South Carolina (32)
2	Iowa
3	UConn
4	NC State
5	Texas
6	USC
7	LSU
8	Stanford
9	UCLA
10	Oregon State
11	Notre Dame
12	Indiana
13	Gonzaga
14	Ohio State
15	Baylor
16	Colorado
17	Virginia Tech
18	Kansas State
19	Creighton
20	Oklahoma
21	Duke
22	Utah
23	Syracuse
24	UNLV
25	West Virginia

== Top 10 matchups ==
Rankings reflect the AP poll Top 25.

=== Regular season ===
- November 6, 2023
  - No. 6 South Carolina defeated No. 10 Notre Dame, 100–71 (Aflac Oui-Play – Halle Georges Carpentier, Paris, France)
- November 9
  - No. 3 Iowa defeated No. 8 Virginia Tech, 80–76 (Ally Tipoff – Spectrum Center, Charlotte, NC)
- November 24
  - No. 2 UCLA defeated No. 6 UConn, 78–67 (Cayman Islands Classic – John Gray Gymnasium, George Town, Cayman Islands)
- November 25
  - No. 10 NC State defeated No. 3 Colorado, 78–60 (Paradise Jam – UVI Sports & Fitness Center, Saint Thomas, U.S. Virgin Islands)
- November 30
  - No. 7 LSU defeated No. 9 Virginia Tech, 82–64 (ACC–SEC Challenge – Pete Maravich Assembly Center, Baton Rouge, LA)
- December 30
  - No. 10 Baylor defeated No. 5 Texas, 85–79 (Moody Center, Austin, TX)
  - No. 2 UCLA defeated No. 6 USC, 71–64 (Pauley Pavilion, Los Angeles, CA)
- January 14, 2024
  - No. 5 Colorado defeated No. 8 Stanford, 71–59 (CU Events Center, Boulder, CO)
  - No. 9 USC defeated No. 2 UCLA, 73–65 (Galen Center, Los Angeles, CA)
- January 19
  - No. 5 UCLA defeated No. 3 Colorado, 76–68 (CU Events Center, Boulder, CO)
- January 21
  - No. 3 Colorado defeated No. 6 USC, 63–59 (CU Events Center, Boulder, CO)
- January 25
  - No. 1 South Carolina defeated No. 9 LSU, 76–70 (Pete Maravich Assembly Center, Baton Rouge, LA)
- February 4
  - No. 8 Ohio State defeated No. 10 Indiana, 74–69 (Value City Arena, Columbus, OH)
  - No. 4 Stanford defeated No. 7 UCLA, 80–60 (Maples Pavilion, Stanford, CA)
- March 3
  - No. 6 Iowa defeated No. 2 Ohio State, 93–83 (Carver-Hawkeye Arena, Iowa City, IA)
- March 8
  - No. 5 USC defeated No. 7 UCLA, 80–70^{2OT} (Pac-12 tournament, MGM Grand Garden Arena, Paradise, NV)
- March 10
  - No. 1 South Carolina defeated No. 8 LSU, 79–72 (SEC tournament, Bon Secours Wellness Arena, Greenville, SC)
  - No. 5 USC defeated No. 2 Stanford, 74–61 (Pac-12 tournament, MGM Grand Garden Arena, Paradise, NV)

=== Postseason ===
- March 30
  - No. 8 LSU defeated No. 6 UCLA, 78–69 (Sweet Sixteen, MVP Arena, Albany, NY)
- April 1
  - No. 2 Iowa defeated No. 8 LSU, 94–87 (Elite Eight, MVP Arena, Albany, NY)
  - No. 10 UConn defeated No. 3 USC, 80–73 (Elite Eight, Moda Center, Portland, OR)
- April 5
  - No. 2 Iowa defeated No. 10 UConn, 71–69 (Final Four, Rocket Mortgage FieldHouse, Cleveland, OH)
- April 7
  - No. 1 South Carolina defeated No. 2 Iowa, 87–75 (national championship game, Rocket Mortgage FieldHouse, Cleveland, OH)

== Regular season ==
=== Upsets ===
An upset is a victory by an underdog team. In the context of NCAA Division I women's basketball, this generally constitutes an unranked team defeating a team currently ranked in the top 25. This list will highlight those upsets of ranked teams by unranked teams as well as upsets of No. 1 teams. Rankings are from the AP poll. Bold type indicates winning teams in "true road games"—i.e., those played on an opponent's home court (including secondary homes). Italics type indicates winning teams in an early-season tournament (or event). Early-season tournaments are tournaments played in the early season. Events are the tournaments with the same teams in it every year (even rivalry games).

Winner	Score	Loser	Date	Tournament/event	Notes
No. 20 Colorado	92–78	No. 1 LSU	November 6, 2023	Naismith Hall of Fame Series	LSU was the first reigning Division I women's champion to lose its season opener since UConn in 1995. The game was played in Las Vegas.
**Oklahoma**	80–70	No. 12 Ole Miss	November 9, 2023		
Marquette	71–67	No. 23 Illinois	November 11, 2023		
NC State	92–81	No. 2 UConn	November 12, 2023		
**Kansas State**	65–58	No. 2 Iowa	November 16, 2023		
**Green Bay**	65–53	No. 22 Creighton	November 16, 2023		
Princeton	77–63	No. 22 Oklahoma	November 23, 2023	Fort Myers Tip-Off	
Alabama	78–73	No. 20 Louisville	November 24, 2023	Betty Chancellor Classic	Game played in Katy, TX
Green Bay	59–48	No. 23 Washington State	November 25, 2023	Cancún Challenge	
Florida Gulf Coast	65–64	No. 18 North Carolina	November 26, 2023	Gulf Coast Showcase	
**Miami (FL)**	74–68	No. 21 Mississippi State	November 29, 2023	ACC–SEC Challenge	
**Arkansas**	71–58	No. 15 Florida State	November 30, 2023	ACC–SEC Challenge	
Southern Miss	61–59	No. 19 Ole Miss	December 2, 2023		
Rhode Island	60–58	No. 25 Princeton	December 3, 2023		
Chattanooga	59–53	No. 21 Mississippi State	December 3, 2023		
Gonzaga	96–78	No. 3 Stanford	December 3, 2023		
West Virginia	83–65	No. 25 Penn State	December 4, 2023		
**Washington**	60–55	No. 21 Washington State	December 10, 2023		
Seton Hall	84–54	No. 23 UNLV	December 16, 2023		
Michigan	69–60	No. 17 Ohio State	December 30, 2023	Rivalry	
Syracuse	86–81	No. 13 Notre Dame	December 31, 2023		
St. John's	57–56	No. 19 Marquette	January 3, 2024		
North Carolina	75–51	No. 25 Syracuse	January 4, 2024		
**Oklahoma State**	67–59	No. 23 TCU	January 6, 2024		
Arizona	71–70^{OT}	No. 15 Utah	January 7, 2024		
**North Carolina**	61–57	No. 16 Notre Dame	January 7, 2024		
Kansas	87–66	No. 4 Baylor	January 10, 2024		
Iowa State	74–64	No. 24 West Virginia	January 10, 2024		
Iowa State	66–63	No. 4 Baylor	January 13, 2024		
Auburn	67–62	No. 7 LSU	January 14, 2024		
Villanova	66–63	No. 22 Marquette	January 17, 2024		
Texas Tech	71–63	No. 24 Iowa State	January 17, 2024		
Miami (FL)	73–59	No. 4 NC State	January 18, 2024		
Syracuse	79–73	No. 15 Florida State	January 18, 2024		
Duke	63–46	No. 14 Virginia Tech	January 18, 2024		
**New Mexico**	69–66	No. 25 UNLV	January 20, 2024		
**Virginia**	91–87	No. 15 Florida State	January 21, 2024		
**Oklahoma**	91–87	No. 10 Texas	January 24, 2024		
Duke	88–46	No. 23 Florida State	January 25, 2024		
Virginia	81–66	No. 20 North Carolina	January 28, 2024		
**Washington**	62–59	No. 11 USC	January 28, 2024		
**Washington State**	85–82	No. 2 UCLA	January 28, 2024		
Mississippi State	77–73	No. 9 LSU	January 29, 2024		
Oklahoma	66–63	No. 2 Kansas State	January 31, 2024		
BYU	78–66	No. 18 Baylor	February 7, 2024		
Nebraska	82–79	No. 2 Iowa	February 11, 2024		
Iowa State	96–93^{2OT}	No. 7 Kansas State	February 14, 2024		
Illinois	86–66	No. 14 Indiana	February 19, 2024		
**Duke**	58–45	No. 17 Syracuse	February 22, 2024		
North Carolina	80–70	No. 6 NC State	February 22, 2024	Rivalry	
**Arizona**	68–61	No. 3 Stanford	February 23, 2024		
Columbia	67–65	No. 25 Princeton	February 24, 2024		
**Virginia**	73–68	No. 20 Louisville	February 25, 2024		
Kansas	59–55	No. 10 Kansas State	February 25, 2024	Sunflower Showdown	
Washington	61–51	No. 9 Oregon State	February 25, 2024		
Duke	69–58	No. 6 NC State	February 25, 2024	Tobacco Road	
Oklahoma State	68–61	No. 24 West Virginia	February 27, 2024		
**Iowa State**	82–76	No. 15 Kansas State	February 28, 2024		
**Washington**	62–47	No. 19 Utah	March 2, 2024		
**Washington State**	72–63	No. 13 Colorado	March 2, 2024		
Kansas	83–74	No. 20 Oklahoma	March 2, 2024		
Virginia	80–75	No. 5 Virginia Tech	March 3, 2024	Rivalry	
Maryland	82–61	No. 4 Ohio State	March 8, 2024	Big Ten tournament	
Florida State	78–65	No. 20 Syracuse	March 8, 2024	ACC tournament	
Michigan	69–56	No. 12 Indiana	March 8, 2024	Big Ten Tournament	
Iowa State	67–62	No. 17 Baylor	March 9, 2024	Big 12 tournament	
Georgetown	55–46	No. 21 Creighton	March 10, 2024	Big East tournament	
Iowa State	85–68	No. 17 Oklahoma	March 11, 2024	Big 12 Tournament	
Portland	67–66	No. 14 Gonzaga	March 12, 2024	WCC tournament	

In addition to the above listed upsets in which an unranked team defeated a ranked team, there have been six non-Division I teams to defeat a Division I team so far this season. Bold type indicates winning teams in "true road games"—i.e., those played on an opponent's home court (including secondary homes).

Winner	Score	Loser	Date	Tournament/event	Notes
**Trevecca Nazarene** (Division II)	75–59	Austin Peay	November 6, 2023		First official game at Austin Peay's new home of F&M Bank Arena
**Illinois–Springfield** (Division II)	71–69	Indiana State	November 15, 2023		
**Hope International** (NAIA)	64–60	Cal State Northridge	November 18, 2023		
**Wingate** (Division II)	72–53	Elon	December 2, 2023		
**Mayville State** (NAIA)	75–68	North Dakota	December 15, 2023		
**Western Colorado** (Division II)	51–49	Utah State	December 18, 2023		

=== Conference winners and tournaments ===
Each of the 32 Division I athletic conferences ends its regular season with a single-elimination tournament. The team with the best regular-season record in each conference receives the number one seed in each tournament, with tiebreakers used as needed in the case of ties for the top seeding. Unless otherwise noted, the winners of these tournaments received automatic invitations to the 2024 NCAA Division I women's basketball tournament.

Conference	Regular season first place	Conference player of the year	Conference coach of the year	Conference tournament	Tournament venue (city)	Tournament winner
America East Conference	Maine	Anne Simon, Maine	Amy Vachon, Maine	2024 America East women's basketball tournament	Campus sites	Maine
American Athletic Conference	North Texas; Temple; Tulsa (Note: Top seed in conference tournament.)	Temira Poindexter, Tulsa	Jason Burton, North Texas	2024 American Athletic Conference women's basketball tournament	Dickies Arena (Fort Worth, TX)	Rice
Atlantic 10 Conference	Richmond	Sarah Te-Biasu, VCU	Aaron Roussell, Richmond	2024 Atlantic 10 women's basketball tournament	Henrico Sports & Events Center (Glen Allen, VA)	Richmond
Atlantic Coast Conference	Virginia Tech	Elizabeth Kitley, Virginia Tech	Felisha Legette-Jack, Syracuse	2024 ACC women's basketball tournament	Greensboro Coliseum (Greensboro, NC)	Notre Dame
Atlantic Sun Conference	Florida Gulf Coast	Emani Jefferson, FGCU	Lynn Bria, Stetson	2024 Atlantic Sun women's basketball tournament	Campus sites	Florida Gulf Coast
Big 12 Conference	Oklahoma	Madison Booker, Texas & Skylar Vann, Oklahoma	Jennie Baranczyk, Oklahoma	2024 Big 12 Conference women's basketball tournament	T-Mobile Center (Kansas City, MO)	Texas
Big East Conference	UConn	Paige Bueckers, UConn	Geno Auriemma, UConn	2024 Big East women's basketball tournament	Mohegan Sun Arena (Uncasville, CT)	UConn
Big Sky Conference	Eastern Washington	Jamie Loera, Eastern Washington	Joddie Gleason, Eastern Washington	2024 Big Sky Conference women's basketball tournament	Idaho Central Arena (Boise, ID)	Eastern Washington
Big South Conference	High Point	Lauren Bevis, High Point	Chelsea Banbury, High Point	2024 Big South Conference women's basketball tournament	Qubein Center (High Point, NC)	Presbyterian
Big Ten Conference	Ohio State	Caitlin Clark, Iowa	Kevin McGuff, Ohio State	2024 Big Ten women's basketball tournament	Target Center (Minneapolis, MN)	Iowa
Big West Conference	Hawaii	Deja Lee, UC Irvine	Laura Beeman, Hawaii	2024 Big West Conference women's basketball tournament	Dollar Loan Center (Henderson, NV)	UC Irvine
Coastal Athletic Association	Stony Brook	Gigi Gonzalez, Stony Brook	Ashley Langford, Stony Brook	2024 CAA women's basketball tournament	Entertainment and Sports Arena (Washington, D.C.)	Drexel
Conference USA	Middle Tennessee	Savannah Wheeler, Middle Tennessee	Jesyka Burks-Wiley, FIU	2024 Conference USA women's basketball tournament	Propst Arena (Huntsville, AL)	Middle Tennessee
Horizon League	Cleveland State	Colbi Maples, Cleveland State	Chris Kielsmeier, Cleveland State	2024 Horizon League women's basketball tournament	Quarterfinals: Campus sites Semifinals and final: Indiana Farmers Coliseum (Indianapolis, IN)	Green Bay
Ivy League	Columbia; Princeton	Abbey Hsu, Columbia	Megan Griffith, Columbia	2024 Ivy League women's basketball tournament	Levien Gymnasium (New York City, NY)	Princeton
Metro Atlantic Athletic Conference	Fairfield	Janelle Brown, Fairfield	Carly Thibault-DuDonis, Fairfield	2024 MAAC women's basketball tournament	Boardwalk Hall (Atlantic City, NJ)	Fairfield
Mid-American Conference	Toledo	Sophia Ward, Toledo	Tricia Cullop, Toledo	2024 Mid-American Conference women's basketball tournament	Rocket Mortgage FieldHouse (Cleveland, OH)	Kent State
Mid-Eastern Athletic Conference	Norfolk State	Kierra Wheeler, Norfolk State	Larry Vickers, Norfolk State	2024 MEAC women's basketball tournament	Norfolk Scope (Norfolk, VA)	Norfolk State
Missouri Valley Conference	Drake	Katie Dinnebier, Drake	Allison Pohlman, Drake	2024 Missouri Valley Conference women's basketball tournament	Vibrant Arena at The MARK (Moline, IL)	Drake
Mountain West Conference	UNLV	Desi-Rae Young, UNLV	Mike Bradbury, New Mexico	2024 Mountain West Conference women's basketball tournament	Thomas and Mack Center (Paradise, NV)	UNLV
Northeast Conference	Sacred Heart	Ny'Ceara Pryor, Sacred Heart	Mary Grimes, Le Moyne	2024 Northeast Conference women's basketball tournament	Campus sites	Sacred Heart
Ohio Valley Conference	Southern Indiana	Macy McGlone, Eastern Illinois	Rick Stein, Southern Indiana	2024 Ohio Valley Conference women's basketball tournament	Ford Center (Evansville, IN)	Southern Indiana (Note: Southern Indiana was ineligible for the NCAA tournament or WBIT as a transitional Division I member. The NCAA automatic bid went to USI's opponent in the OVC final, UT Martin.)
Pac-12 Conference	Stanford	Cameron Brink, Stanford (coaches & media)	Tara VanDerveer, Stanford (coaches); Scott Rueck, Oregon State (media)	2024 Pac-12 Conference women's basketball tournament	MGM Grand Garden Arena (Paradise, NV)	USC
Patriot League	Holy Cross	Caitlin Weimar, Boston University	Danielle O'Banion, Loyola (MD)	2024 Patriot League women's basketball tournament	Campus sites	Holy Cross
Southeastern Conference	South Carolina	Angel Reese, LSU	Dawn Staley, South Carolina	2024 SEC women's basketball tournament	Bon Secours Wellness Arena (Greenville, SC)	South Carolina
Southern Conference	Chattanooga	Rachael Rose, Wofford	Shawn Poppie, Chattanooga	2024 Southern Conference women's basketball tournament	Harrah's Cherokee Center (Asheville, NC)	Chattanooga
Southland Conference	Lamar	Akasha Davis, Lamar	Aqua Franklin, Lamar	2024 Southland Conference women's basketball tournament	The Legacy Center (Lake Charles, LA)	Texas A&M–Corpus Christi
Southwestern Athletic Conference	Jackson State	Ahriahna Grizzle, Florida A&M	Tomekia Reed, Jackson State	2024 SWAC women's basketball tournament	Bartow Arena (Birmingham, AL)	Jackson State
Summit League	South Dakota State	Brooklyn Meyer, South Dakota State	Aaron Johnston, South Dakota State	2024 Summit League women's basketball tournament	Denny Sanford Premier Center (Sioux Falls, SD)	South Dakota State
Sun Belt Conference	Marshall	Abby Beeman, Marshall	Kim Caldwell, Marshall	2024 Sun Belt Conference women's basketball tournament	Pensacola Bay Center (Pensacola, FL)	Marshall
West Coast Conference	Gonzaga	Yvonne Ejim, Gonzaga	Lisa Fortier, Gonzaga	2024 West Coast Conference women's basketball tournament	Orleans Arena (Paradise, NV)	Portland
Western Athletic Conference	California Baptist	Chloe Webb, California Baptist	Jarrod Olson, California Baptist	2024 WAC women's basketball tournament	Orleans Arena (Paradise, NV)	California Baptist

=== Statistical leaders ===
Source
Note: statistics include post-season games. Players must have played in 75% of their team's games, minimum, to be included.

Points per game
Player	School	PPG
Caitlin Clark	Iowa	31.6
JuJu Watkins	USC	27.1
Lucy Olsen	Villanova	23.3
Chellia Watson	Buffalo	23.0
Elizabeth Kitley	Virginia Tech	22.8

Rebounds per game
Player	School	RPG
Lauren Gustin	BYU	15.3
Angel Reese	LSU	13.4
Phillipina Kyei	Oregon	11.9
Macy McGlone	Eastern Illinois	11.9
Cameron Brink	Stanford	11.9

Assists per game
Player	School	APG
Caitlin Clark	Iowa	8.9
McKenna Hofschild	Colorado State	7.3
Katie Dinnebier	Drake	6.9
Georgia Amoore	Virginia Tech	6.8
Benthe Versteeg	Sacramento State	6.7

Steals per game
Player	School	SPG
Hannah Hidalgo	Notre Dame	4.57
Elisa Mevius	Siena	4.50
Jordyn Cambridge	Vanderbilt	3.55
Ny'Ceara Pryor	Sacred Heart	3.38
Sydney Woodley	Long Beach State	3.35

Blocks per game
Player	School	BPG
Cameron Brink	Stanford	3.74
Lucy Cochrane	Portland	3.09
Taiyanna Jackson	Kansas	3.03
Angel Jackson	Jackson State	2.94
Anastasiia Boldyreva	Middle Tennessee	2.89

Field goal percentage
Player	School	FG%
Raegan Beers	Oregon State	66.37
Erika Porter	Bowling Green	66.25
Mackenzie Holmes	Indiana	65.00
Lauren Betts	UCLA	64.34
Hannah Stuelke	Iowa	62.70

Three-point field goal percentage
Player	School	3P%
Te-Hina Paopao	South Carolina	46.77
Kailey Woolston	BYU	46.55
Hannah Kohn	Chattanooga	46.26
Meghan Huerter	UAlbany	45.93
Elle Evans	North Dakota State	45.73

Free throw percentage
Player	School	FT%
Maya McDermott	UNI	96.39
Ja'Niah Henson	Texas State	93.10
Hayley Frank	Missouri	92.50
Kacie Borowicz	North Dakota	92.03
Elle Evans	North Dakota State	91.75

== Postseason ==
=== Tournament upsets ===
Per the NCAA, "Upsets are defined as when the winner of the game was seeded two or more places lower than the team it defeated."

Round	Albany 1	Portland 4	Albany 2	Portland 3
First round	None	None	No. 11 Middle Tennessee defeated No. 6 Louisville, 71–69.	None
Second Round	None	None	None	No. 7 Duke defeated No. 2 Ohio State, 75–63.
Sweet 16	None	None	None	None
Elite 8	None	No. 3 NC State defeated No. 1 Texas, 76–66.	None	No. 3 UConn defeated No. 1 USC, 80–73.
Final 4	None			

=== Final Four – Rocket Mortgage FieldHouse, Cleveland, Ohio ===
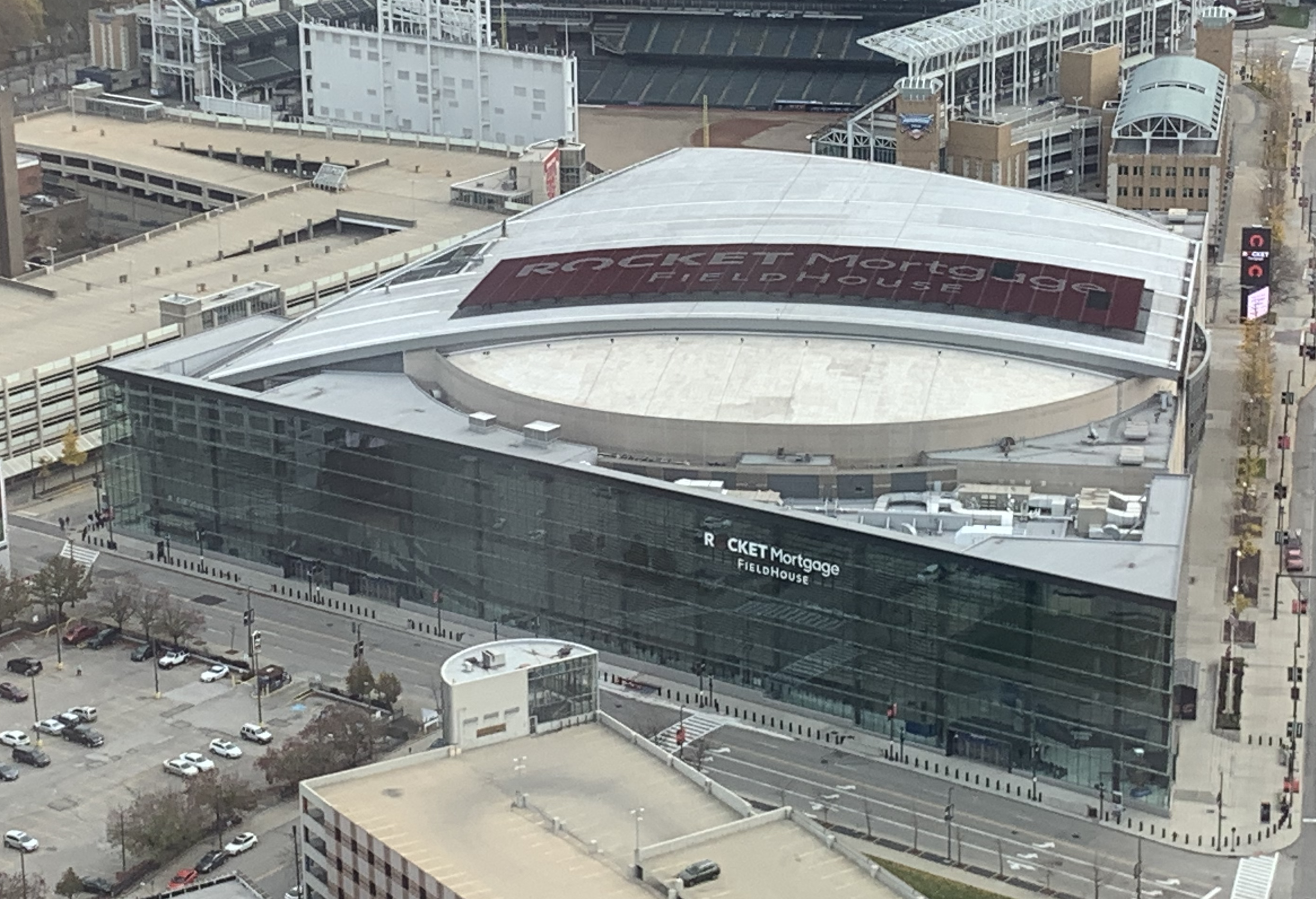
Rocket Mortgage FieldHouse in Cleveland, Ohio, hosted the NCAA women's Final Four.

National semifinals Final Four; Friday, April 5
A1(1)	South Carolina	78
P4(3)	NC State	59
A2(1)	Iowa	71
P3(3)	UConn	69

National Championship; Sunday, April 7
A1(1)	South Carolina	87
A2(1)	Iowa	75

=== Women's Basketball Invitation Tournament ===
The 2023–24 season was the first for the WBIT, created by the NCAA as a direct parallel to the men's National Invitation Tournament. Like the NIT, the WBIT features 32 teams. The NCAA extends WBIT bids to all regular-season conference champions that fail to reach the NCAA tournament (if eligible), a practice that it abandoned for the NIT after that tournament's 2023 edition. All games before the semifinals are at campus sites, with the semifinals and final at Hinkle Fieldhouse in Indianapolis.

==== Semifinals and finals ====
Semifinals; April 1
4	Illinois	81
1	Washington State	58
1	Villanova	58
1	Penn State	53

Championship; April 3
4	Illinois	71
1	Villanova	57

=== Women's National Invitation Tournament ===
The 2023–24 season was the 26th for the WNIT, which featured 48 teams that were not selected for either the NCAA Tournament or the WBIT.

==== Semifinals and finals ====
Semifinals; April 3
Saint Louis	57
Vermont	54
Minnesota	74
Troy	69

Championship; April 6
Saint Louis	69
Minnesota	50

== Conference standings ==
2023–24 America East Conference women's basketball standings
	Conf.				Overall
Team	W		L	PCT	W		L	PCT
Maine †	14	–	2	.875	24	–	10	.706
Albany	13	–	3	.813	25	–	7	.781
Vermont	12	–	4	.750	25	–	12	.676
Bryant	8	–	8	.500	15	–	15	.500
Binghamton	8	–	8	.500	14	–	17	.452
UMBC	6	–	10	.375	10	–	19	.345
NJIT	4	–	12	.250	12	–	18	.400
UMass Lowell	4	–	12	.250	4	–	25	.138
New Hampshire	3	–	13	.188	9	–	20	.310
† 2024 AmEast tournament winner

2023–24 American Athletic Conference women's basketball standings
	Conf.				Overall
Team	W		L	PCT	W		L	PCT
Tulsa	13	–	5	.722	25	–	10	.714
North Texas	13	–	5	.722	23	–	9	.719
Temple	13	–	5	.722	20	–	12	.625
UTSA	10	–	8	.556	18	–	15	.545
South Florida	10	–	8	.556	19	–	14	.576
Charlotte	9	–	9	.500	16	–	15	.516
UAB	9	–	9	.500	18	–	14	.563
Memphis	9	–	9	.500	13	–	17	.433
East Carolina	9	–	9	.500	19	–	14	.576
Rice †	9	–	9	.500	19	–	15	.559
SMU	8	–	10	.444	14	–	16	.467
Florida Atlantic	6	–	12	.333	11	–	19	.367
Wichita State	5	–	13	.278	10	–	22	.313
Tulane	3	–	15	.167	12	–	20	.375
† 2024 AAC tournament winner

2023–24 Atlantic 10 women's basketball standings
	Conf.				Overall
Team	W		L	PCT	W		L	PCT
Richmond †	16	–	2	.889	29	–	6	.829
VCU	15	–	3	.833	26	–	6	.813
Saint Joseph's	15	–	3	.833	28	–	6	.824
George Mason	14	–	4	.778	23	–	8	.742
Duquesne	13	–	5	.722	21	–	13	.618
Rhode Island	10	–	8	.556	21	–	14	.600
Saint Louis	9	–	9	.500	22	–	18	.550
Davidson*	8	–	10	.444	18	–	8	.692
Loyola Chicago	8	–	10	.444	15	–	16	.484
Fordham	8	–	10	.444	12	–	17	.414
George Washington	6	–	12	.333	13	–	18	.419
Dayton	5	–	13	.278	12	–	19	.387
La Salle	5	–	13	.278	8	–	22	.267
UMass	2	–	16	.111	5	–	27	.156
St. Bonaventure	1	–	17	.056	4	–	26	.133
† 2024 A10 tournament winner * Season cancelled on March 1, 2024.

2023–24 ACC women's basketball standings
	Conf.				Overall
Team	W		L	PCT	W		L	PCT
No. 18 Virginia Tech	14	–	4	.778	25	–	8	.758
No. 4 NC State	13	–	5	.722	31	–	7	.816
No. 20 Syracuse	13	–	5	.722	24	–	8	.750
No. 11 Notre Dame †	13	–	5	.722	28	–	7	.800
Louisville	12	–	6	.667	24	–	10	.706
Florida State	12	–	6	.667	23	–	11	.676
No. 17 Duke	11	–	7	.611	22	–	12	.647
North Carolina	11	–	7	.611	20	–	13	.606
Miami (FL)	8	–	10	.444	19	–	12	.613
Georgia Tech	7	–	11	.389	17	–	16	.515
Virginia	7	–	11	.389	16	–	16	.500
Clemson	5	–	13	.278	12	–	19	.387
Boston College	5	–	13	.278	14	–	19	.424
Wake Forest	2	–	16	.111	7	–	25	.219
Pittsburgh	2	–	16	.111	8	–	24	.250
† 2024 ACC tournament winner Rankings from AP poll

2023–24 ASUN women's basketball standings
	Conf.				Overall
Team	W		L	PCT	W		L	PCT
Florida Gulf Coast †	16	–	0	1.000	29	–	5	.853
Stetson	12	–	4	.750	17	–	15	.531
Central Arkansas	11	–	5	.688	21	–	12	.636
Lipscomb	10	–	6	.625	17	–	13	.567
Eastern Kentucky	9	–	7	.563	22	–	12	.647
North Alabama	8	–	8	.500	12	–	18	.400
Austin Peay	8	–	8	.500	17	–	16	.515
Kennesaw State	7	–	9	.438	11	–	19	.367
Jacksonville	6	–	10	.375	11	–	20	.355
Bellarmine*	5	–	11	.313	10	–	19	.345
North Florida	3	–	13	.188	9	–	21	.300
Queens*	1	–	15	.063	7	–	22	.241
† 2024 ASUN tournament winner *Ineligible for the 2024 NCAA tournament due to transition from Division II

2023–24 Big 12 Conference women's basketball standings
	Conf.				Overall
Team	W		L	PCT	W		L	PCT
No. 21 Oklahoma	15	–	3	.833	23	–	10	.697
No. 7 Texas †	14	–	4	.778	33	–	5	.868
No. 19 Kansas State	13	–	5	.722	26	–	8	.765
No. 25 Iowa State	12	–	6	.667	21	–	12	.636
No. 13 Baylor	12	–	6	.667	26	–	8	.765
No. 24 West Virginia	12	–	6	.667	25	–	8	.758
Kansas	11	–	7	.611	20	–	13	.606
Oklahoma State	7	–	11	.389	14	–	16	.467
TCU	6	–	12	.333	21	–	12	.636
BYU	6	–	12	.333	16	–	17	.485
Cincinnati	5	–	13	.278	14	–	18	.438
Texas Tech	5	–	13	.278	17	–	16	.515
Houston	5	–	13	.278	14	–	16	.467
UCF	3	–	15	.167	12	–	17	.414
† 2024 Big 12 tournament winner Rankings from AP poll

2023–24 Big East women's basketball standings
	Conf.				Overall
Team	W		L	PCT	W		L	PCT
No. 3 UConn †	18	–	0	1.000	33	–	6	.846
No. 23 Creighton	15	–	3	.833	26	–	6	.813
St. John's	11	–	7	.611	18	–	15	.545
Villanova	11	–	7	.611	22	–	13	.629
Marquette	11	–	7	.611	23	–	9	.719
Georgetown	9	–	9	.500	23	–	12	.657
Seton Hall	8	–	10	.444	17	–	15	.531
Butler	6	–	12	.333	15	–	17	.469
Providence	6	–	12	.333	13	–	21	.382
DePaul	4	–	14	.222	12	–	20	.375
Xavier	0	–	18	.000	1	–	27	.036
† 2024 Big East tournament winner Rankings from AP poll

2023–24 Big Sky women's basketball standings
	Conf.				Overall
Team	W		L	PCT	W		L	PCT
Eastern Washington †	16	–	2	.889	29	–	6	.829
Northern Arizona	15	–	3	.833	25	–	9	.735
Montana	13	–	5	.722	23	–	10	.697
Montana State	10	–	8	.556	17	–	16	.515
Northern Colorado	10	–	8	.556	15	–	16	.484
Idaho	8	–	10	.444	15	–	16	.484
Idaho State	7	–	11	.389	11	–	19	.367
Sacramento State	4	–	14	.222	6	–	25	.194
Weber State	4	–	14	.222	8	–	25	.242
Portland State	3	–	15	.167	8	–	23	.258
† 2024 Big Sky tournament winner

2023–24 Big South women's basketball standings
	Conf.				Overall
Team	W		L	PCT	W		L	PCT
High Point	14	–	2	.875	20	–	12	.625
USC Upstate	10	–	6	.625	16	–	16	.500
Radford	9	–	7	.563	15	–	18	.455
Charleston Southern	8	–	8	.500	11	–	19	.367
Presbyterian †	8	–	8	.500	21	–	15	.583
Winthrop	8	–	8	.500	14	–	16	.467
Longwood	6	–	10	.375	9	–	21	.300
Gardner–Webb	5	–	11	.313	6	–	24	.200
UNC Asheville	4	–	12	.250	11	–	20	.355
† 2024 Big South tournament winner

2023–24 Big Ten women's basketball standings
	Conf.				Overall
Team	W		L	PCT	W		L	PCT
No. 16 Ohio State	16	–	2	.889	26	–	6	.813
No. 2 Iowa †	15	–	3	.833	34	–	5	.872
No. 12 Indiana	15	–	3	.833	26	–	6	.813
Michigan State	12	–	6	.667	22	–	9	.710
Nebraska	11	–	7	.611	23	–	12	.657
Michigan	9	–	9	.500	20	–	14	.588
Penn State	9	–	9	.500	22	–	13	.629
Maryland	9	–	9	.500	19	–	14	.576
Illinois	8	–	10	.444	19	–	15	.559
Wisconsin	6	–	12	.333	15	–	17	.469
Minnesota	5	–	13	.278	20	–	16	.556
Purdue	5	–	13	.278	15	–	19	.441
Northwestern	4	–	14	.222	9	–	21	.300
Rutgers	2	–	16	.111	8	–	24	.250
† 2024 Big Ten tournament winner Rankings from AP Poll

2023–24 Big West women's basketball standings
	Conf.				Overall
Team	W		L	PCT	W		L	PCT
Hawai'i	17	–	3	.850	20	–	12	.625
UC Irvine †	16	–	4	.800	23	–	9	.719
UC Riverside	13	–	7	.650	18	–	14	.563
Cal Poly	13	–	7	.650	17	–	14	.548
UC Davis	13	–	7	.650	20	–	14	.588
UC Santa Barbara	10	–	10	.500	16	–	15	.516
UC San Diego*	8	–	12	.400	12	–	19	.387
Long Beach State	8	–	12	.400	15	–	18	.455
Cal State Fullerton	6	–	14	.300	10	–	21	.323
Cal State Bakersfield	5	–	15	.250	8	–	21	.276
Cal State Northridge	1	–	19	.050	3	–	27	.100
† 2024 Big West tournament winner * ineligible for the 2024 NCAA tournament due to transition period

2023–24 CAA women's basketball standings
	Conf.				Overall
Team	W		L	PCT	W		L	PCT
Stony Brook	16	–	2	.889	28	–	5	.848
Monmouth	14	–	4	.778	22	–	10	.688
Charleston	13	–	5	.722	22	–	10	.688
North Carolina A&T	13	–	5	.722	22	–	12	.647
William & Mary	12	–	6	.667	15	–	14	.517
Towson	11	–	7	.611	20	–	11	.645
Drexel †	10	–	8	.556	19	–	15	.559
Campbell	9	–	9	.500	17	–	14	.548
Elon	7	–	11	.389	11	–	21	.344
Delaware	7	–	11	.389	11	–	20	.355
Northeastern	5	–	13	.278	10	–	17	.370
Hampton	3	–	15	.167	3	–	26	.103
Hofstra	3	–	15	.167	11	–	21	.344
UNC Wilmington	3	–	15	.167	5	–	25	.167
† 2024 CAA tournament winner

2023–24 Conference USA women's basketball standings
	Conf.				Overall
Team	W		L	PCT	W		L	PCT
Middle Tennessee †	16	–	0	1.000	30	–	5	.857
Liberty	11	–	5	.688	18	–	16	.529
FIU	11	–	5	.688	21	–	12	.636
Louisiana Tech	7	–	9	.438	14	–	19	.424
Jacksonville State	7	–	9	.438	12	–	17	.414
New Mexico State	6	–	10	.375	13	–	18	.419
Western Kentucky	6	–	10	.375	15	–	17	.469
UTEP	6	–	10	.375	12	–	19	.387
Sam Houston	2	–	14	.125	7	–	22	.241
† 2024 CUSA tournament winner

2023–24 Horizon League women's basketball standings
	Conf.				Overall
Team	W		L	PCT	W		L	PCT
Cleveland State	18	–	2	.900	29	–	6	.829
Green Bay †	17	–	3	.850	27	–	7	.794
Purdue Fort Wayne	13	–	7	.650	23	–	13	.639
Wright State	11	–	9	.550	18	–	15	.545
Milwaukee	10	–	10	.500	16	–	16	.500
Detroit Mercy	9	–	11	.450	17	–	16	.515
Youngstown State	9	–	11	.450	14	–	18	.438
Oakland	8	–	12	.400	12	–	17	.414
Northern Kentucky	8	–	12	.400	11	–	20	.355
IUPUI	5	–	15	.250	7	–	23	.233
Robert Morris	2	–	18	.100	6	–	24	.200
† 2024 Horizon League tournament winner

2023–24 Ivy League women's basketball standings
	Conf.				Overall
Team	W		L	PCT	W		L	PCT
Princeton †	13	–	1	.929	25	–	5	.833
Columbia	13	–	1	.929	23	–	7	.767
Harvard	9	–	5	.643	16	–	12	.571
Penn	7	–	7	.500	15	–	13	.536
Brown	7	–	7	.500	16	–	11	.593
Yale	5	–	9	.357	8	–	19	.296
Cornell	1	–	13	.071	7	–	19	.269
Dartmouth	1	–	13	.071	7	–	19	.269
† 2024 Ivy League tournament winner

2023–24 MAAC women's basketball standings
	Conf.				Overall
Team	W		L	PCT	W		L	PCT
Fairfield †	20	–	0	1.000	31	–	2	.939
Niagara	15	–	5	.750	21	–	14	.600
Siena	14	–	6	.700	18	–	12	.600
Manhattan	11	–	9	.550	18	–	12	.600
Canisius	11	–	9	.550	17	–	14	.548
Mount St. Mary's	10	–	10	.500	14	–	17	.452
Quinnipiac	9	–	11	.450	13	–	18	.419
Rider	6	–	14	.300	10	–	21	.323
Iona	6	–	14	.300	11	–	19	.367
Saint Peter's	4	–	16	.200	7	–	23	.233
Marist	4	–	16	.200	6	–	25	.194
† 2024 MAAC tournament winner

2023–24 Mid-American Conference women's basketball standings
	Conf.				Overall
Team	W		L	PCT	W		L	PCT
Toledo	17	–	1	.944	28	–	6	.824
Ball State	16	–	2	.889	28	–	6	.824
Kent State †	13	–	5	.722	21	–	12	.636
Buffalo	10	–	8	.556	19	–	14	.576
Bowling Green	10	–	8	.556	16	–	15	.516
Northern Illinois	8	–	10	.444	15	–	16	.484
Ohio	8	–	10	.444	11	–	19	.367
Western Michigan	7	–	11	.389	12	–	18	.400
Miami (OH)	6	–	12	.333	9	–	20	.310
Akron	6	–	12	.333	11	–	18	.379
Central Michigan	4	–	14	.222	6	–	22	.214
Eastern Michigan	3	–	15	.167	7	–	22	.241
† 2024 MAC tournament winner

2023–24 MEAC women's basketball standings
	Conf.				Overall
Team	W		L	PCT	W		L	PCT
Norfolk State †	13	–	1	.929	27	–	6	.818
Howard	10	–	4	.714	15	–	16	.484
North Carolina Central	9	–	5	.643	16	–	15	.516
Maryland Eastern Shore	8	–	6	.571	15	–	15	.500
Coppin State	8	–	6	.571	12	–	18	.400
Delaware State	4	–	10	.286	8	–	20	.286
Morgan State	3	–	11	.214	8	–	22	.267
South Carolina State	1	–	13	.071	2	–	28	.067
† 2024 MEAC tournament winner

2023–24 Missouri Valley Conference women's basketball standings
	Conf.				Overall
Team	W		L	PCT	W		L	PCT
Drake †	19	–	1	.950	29	–	6	.829
Belmont	17	–	3	.850	26	–	9	.743
Missouri State	15	–	5	.750	23	–	10	.697
Northern Iowa	14	–	6	.700	16	–	16	.500
Illinois State	13	–	7	.650	22	–	12	.647
Murray State	12	–	8	.600	20	–	12	.625
UIC	10	–	10	.500	18	–	16	.529
Southern Illinois	6	–	14	.300	11	–	20	.355
Indiana State	6	–	14	.300	11	–	21	.344
Valparaiso	4	–	16	.200	5	–	25	.167
Bradley	2	–	18	.100	6	–	26	.188
Evansville	2	–	18	.100	4	–	28	.125
† 2024 MVC tournament winner

2023–24 Mountain West Conference women's basketball standings
	Conf.				Overall
Team	W		L	PCT	W		L	PCT
UNLV †	17	–	1	.944	30	–	3	.909
New Mexico	12	–	6	.667	21	–	11	.656
Wyoming	11	–	7	.611	18	–	15	.545
Nevada	10	–	8	.556	16	–	16	.500
Colorado State	10	–	8	.556	20	–	11	.645
San Diego State	10	–	8	.556	22	–	13	.629
Boise State	10	–	8	.556	21	–	14	.600
Air Force	8	–	10	.444	15	–	17	.469
Fresno State	7	–	11	.389	14	–	18	.438
Utah State	2	–	16	.111	5	–	25	.167
San Jose State	2	–	16	.111	7	–	24	.226
† 2024 Mountain West tournament winner

2023–24 NCAA Division I women's basketball independents standings
	Conf.				Overall
Team	W		L	PCT	W		L	PCT
Chicago State		–		–	1	–	26	.037

2023–24 Northeast Conference women's basketball standings
	Conf.				Overall
Team	W		L	PCT	W		L	PCT
Sacred Heart †	15	–	1	.938	24	–	10	.706
Le Moyne*	14	–	2	.875	18	–	15	.545
Fairleigh Dickinson	11	–	5	.688	14	–	17	.452
Merrimack	8	–	8	.500	12	–	19	.387
Central Connecticut	7	–	9	.438	9	–	21	.300
LIU	5	–	11	.313	8	–	22	.267
Stonehill*	4	–	12	.250	4	–	26	.133
Saint Francis	4	–	12	.250	5	–	25	.167
Wagner	4	–	12	.250	7	–	21	.250
† 2024 NEC tournament winner * ineligible for the 2024 NCAA tournament due to transition period

2023–24 Ohio Valley Conference women's basketball standings
	Conf.				Overall
Team	W		L	PCT	W		L	PCT
Southern Indiana* †	17	–	1	.944	25	–	7	.781
Little Rock	11	–	7	.611	12	–	18	.400
UT Martin	11	–	7	.611	16	–	17	.485
Eastern Illinois	11	–	7	.611	15	–	18	.455
Morehead State	10	–	8	.556	15	–	15	.500
Tennessee Tech	10	–	8	.556	16	–	15	.516
Western Illinois	9	–	9	.500	18	–	12	.600
Tennessee State	7	–	11	.389	11	–	19	.367
Southeast Missouri State	6	–	12	.333	9	–	20	.310
Lindenwood*	5	–	13	.278	7	–	21	.250
SIU Edwardsville	2	–	16	.111	5	–	26	.161
† 2024 OVC tournament winner * ineligible for the 2024 NCAA tournament due to transition period

2023–24 Pac-12 Conference women's basketball standings
	Conf.				Overall
Team	W		L	PCT	W		L	PCT
No. 9 Stanford	15	–	3	.833	30	–	6	.833
No. 5 USC †	13	–	5	.722	29	–	6	.829
No. 10 UCLA	13	–	5	.722	27	–	7	.794
No. 8 Oregon State	12	–	6	.667	27	–	8	.771
No. 15 Colorado	11	–	7	.611	24	–	10	.706
No. 22 Utah	11	–	7	.611	23	–	11	.676
Arizona	8	–	10	.444	18	–	16	.529
California	7	–	11	.389	19	–	15	.559
Washington State	7	–	11	.389	21	–	15	.583
Washington	6	–	12	.333	16	–	15	.516
Arizona State	3	–	15	.167	11	–	20	.355
Oregon	2	–	16	.111	11	–	21	.344
† 2024 Pac-12 tournament winner Rankings from AP Poll

2023–24 Patriot League women's basketball standings
	Conf.				Overall
Team	W		L	PCT	W		L	PCT
Holy Cross †	11	–	7	.611	21	–	13	.618
Colgate	10	–	8	.556	20	–	14	.588
Boston University	10	–	8	.556	20	–	12	.625
Loyola	10	–	8	.556	16	–	15	.516
Lehigh	9	–	9	.500	17	–	13	.567
Army	9	–	9	.500	12	–	17	.414
Navy	9	–	9	.500	14	–	17	.452
Bucknell	9	–	9	.500	13	–	18	.419
American	8	–	10	.444	10	–	20	.333
Lafayette	5	–	13	.278	10	–	20	.333
† 2024 Patriot League tournament winner

2023–24 SEC women's basketball standings
	Conf.				Overall
Team	W		L	PCT	W		L	PCT
No. 1 South Carolina †	16	–	0	1.000	38	–	0	1.000
No. 6 LSU	13	–	3	.813	31	–	6	.838
Ole Miss	12	–	4	.750	24	–	9	.727
Alabama	10	–	6	.625	24	–	10	.706
Tennessee	10	–	6	.625	20	–	13	.606
Vanderbilt	9	–	7	.563	23	–	10	.697
Mississippi State	8	–	8	.500	23	–	12	.657
Auburn	8	–	8	.500	20	–	12	.625
Texas A&M	6	–	10	.375	19	–	13	.594
Arkansas	6	–	10	.375	18	–	15	.545
Florida	5	–	11	.313	16	–	16	.500
Kentucky	4	–	12	.250	12	–	20	.375
Georgia	3	–	13	.188	12	–	18	.400
Missouri	2	–	14	.125	11	–	19	.367
† 2024 SEC tournament winner Rankings from AP poll

2023–24 SWAC women's basketball standings
	Conf.				Overall
Team	W		L	PCT	W		L	PCT
Jackson State †	18	–	0	1.000	26	–	7	.788
Grambling State	15	–	3	.833	23	–	10	.697
Southern	13	–	5	.722	15	–	15	.500
Arkansas–Pine Bluff	11	–	7	.611	17	–	16	.515
Alabama A&M	10	–	8	.556	15	–	16	.484
Florida A&M	8	–	10	.444	9	–	21	.300
Alcorn State	8	–	10	.444	12	–	20	.375
Prairie View A&M	7	–	11	.389	11	–	18	.379
Texas Southern	6	–	12	.333	7	–	22	.241
Bethune–Cookman	6	–	12	.333	15	–	16	.484
Mississippi Valley State	3	–	15	.167	4	–	27	.129
Alabama State	3	–	15	.167	3	–	26	.103
† 2024 SWAC tournament winner

2023–24 Southern Conference women's basketball standings
	Conf.				Overall
Team	W		L	PCT	W		L	PCT
Chattanooga †	13	–	1	.929	28	–	5	.848
UNC Greensboro	8	–	6	.571	21	–	12	.636
Wofford	8	–	6	.571	17	–	13	.567
Mercer	8	–	6	.571	15	–	17	.469
East Tennessee State	7	–	7	.500	18	–	12	.600
Samford	6	–	8	.429	14	–	16	.467
Furman	5	–	9	.357	15	–	16	.484
Western Carolina	1	–	13	.071	6	–	24	.200
† 2024 SoCon tournament winner

2023–24 Southland Conference women's basketball standings
	Conf.				Overall
Team	W		L	PCT	W		L	PCT
Lamar	17	–	1	.944	24	–	7	.774
Texas A&M–Corpus Christi †	14	–	4	.778	23	–	9	.719
Southeastern Louisiana	14	–	4	.778	19	–	12	.613
Incarnate Word	12	–	6	.667	19	–	11	.633
Texas A&M–Commerce*	8	–	10	.444	15	–	16	.484
New Orleans	8	–	10	.444	11	–	19	.367
Nicholls	7	–	11	.389	14	–	18	.438
Northwestern State	7	–	11	.389	11	–	19	.367
McNeese	2	–	16	.111	6	–	25	.194
Houston Christian	1	–	17	.056	6	–	23	.207
† 2024 Southland tournament winner * ineligible for the 2024 NCAA tournament due to transition from Division II.

2023–24 Summit League women's basketball standings
	Conf.				Overall
Team	W		L	PCT	W		L	PCT
South Dakota State †	16	–	0	1.000	27	–	6	.818
North Dakota State	13	–	3	.813	22	–	12	.647
Oral Roberts	11	–	5	.688	21	–	11	.656
South Dakota	9	–	7	.563	23	–	13	.639
St. Thomas*	7	–	9	.438	15	–	16	.484
North Dakota	5	–	11	.313	9	–	21	.300
Denver	5	–	11	.313	8	–	22	.267
Kansas City	3	–	13	.188	12	–	20	.375
Omaha	3	–	13	.188	8	–	23	.258
† 2024 Summit League tournament winner * Ineligible for the 2024 NCAA tournament due to transition from Division III

2023–24 Sun Belt Conference women's basketball standings
	Conf.				Overall
Team	W		L	PCT	W		L	PCT
Marshall †	17	–	1	.944	26	–	7	.788
Troy	15	–	3	.833	22	–	12	.647
James Madison	13	–	5	.722	23	–	12	.657
Old Dominion	12	–	6	.667	22	–	10	.688
Louisiana–Monroe	10	–	8	.556	21	–	14	.600
Southern Miss	10	–	8	.556	20	–	14	.588
Louisiana	10	–	8	.556	17	–	14	.548
Appalachian State	9	–	9	.500	17	–	15	.531
Georgia State	9	–	9	.500	15	–	15	.500
Arkansas State	6	–	12	.333	13	–	17	.433
Coastal Carolina	5	–	13	.278	12	–	21	.364
Georgia Southern	4	–	14	.222	15	–	18	.455
Texas State	4	–	14	.222	14	–	18	.438
South Alabama	2	–	16	.111	9	–	23	.281
† 2024 Sun Belt tournament winner

2023–24 WAC women's basketball standings
	Conf.				Overall
Team	W		L	PCT	W		L	PCT
California Baptist †	18	–	2	.900	28	–	4	.875
Grand Canyon	16	–	4	.800	24	–	8	.750
Stephen F. Austin	14	–	6	.700	21	–	12	.636
Utah Tech*	12	–	8	.600	18	–	14	.563
UT Arlington	11	–	9	.550	17	–	16	.515
Abilene Christian	10	–	10	.500	14	–	16	.467
Tarleton State*	7	–	13	.350	12	–	20	.375
Seattle	6	–	14	.300	6	–	23	.207
Southern Utah	6	–	14	.300	8	–	22	.267
UT Rio Grande Valley	5	–	15	.250	6	–	23	.207
Utah Valley	5	–	15	.250	10	–	19	.345
† 2024 WAC tournament winner * Ineligible for the 2024 NCAA tournament due to transition from Division II

2023–24 West Coast Conference women's basketball standings
	Conf.				Overall
Team	W		L	PCT	W		L	PCT
No. 14 Gonzaga	16	–	0	1.000	32	–	4	.889
Santa Clara	12	–	4	.750	25	–	9	.735
Portland †	10	–	6	.625	21	–	13	.618
San Francisco	10	–	6	.625	14	–	16	.467
Pacific	8	–	8	.500	18	–	15	.545
Saint Mary's	6	–	10	.375	13	–	18	.419
Loyola Marymount	5	–	11	.313	11	–	19	.367
San Diego	4	–	12	.250	9	–	22	.290
Pepperdine	1	–	15	.063	5	–	25	.167
† 2024 WCC tournament winner Rankings from AP poll

== Award winners ==
=== All-America teams ===
The NCAA has never recognized a consensus All-America team in women's basketball. This differs from the practice in men's basketball, in which the NCAA uses a combination of selections by the Associated Press (AP), the National Association of Basketball Coaches (NABC), The Sporting News and the United States Basketball Writers Association (USBWA) to determine a consensus All-America team. The selection of a consensus team is possible because all four organizations select at least a first and second team, with only the USBWA not selecting a third team.

Before the 2017–18 season, it was impossible for a consensus women's All-America team to be determined because the AP had been the only body that divided its women's selections into separate teams. The USBWA first named separate teams in 2017–18. The women's counterpart to the NABC, the Women's Basketball Coaches Association (WBCA), continues the USBWA's former practice of selecting a single ten-member (plus ties) team. The NCAA does not recognize The Sporting News as an All-America selector in women's basketball.

=== Major player of the year awards ===
- Wooden Award: Caitlin Clark, Iowa
- Naismith Award: Caitlin Clark, Iowa
- Associated Press Player of the Year: Caitlin Clark, Iowa
- Wade Trophy: Caitlin Clark, Iowa
- Ann Meyers Drysdale Women's Player of the Year (USBWA): Caitlin Clark, Iowa

=== Major freshman of the year awards ===
- Tamika Catchings Award (USBWA): JuJu Watkins, USC
- WBCA Freshman of the Year: JuJu Watkins, USC

=== Major coach of the year awards ===
- Associated Press Coach of the Year: Dawn Staley, South Carolina
- Naismith College Coach of the Year: Dawn Staley, South Carolina
- USBWA National Coach of the Year: Dawn Staley, South Carolina
- WBCA National Coach of the Year: Dawn Staley, South Carolina
- WBCA Assistant Coach of the Year: Kate Paye, Stanford

=== Other major awards ===
- Naismith Starting Five:
  - Nancy Lieberman Award (top point guard): Caitlin Clark, Iowa
  - Ann Meyers Drysdale Award (top shooting guard): JuJu Watkins, USC
  - Cheryl Miller Award (top small forward): Madison Booker, Texas
  - Katrina McClain Award (top power forward): Kiki Iriafen, Stanford
  - Lisa Leslie Award (top center): Cameron Brink, Stanford
- WBCA Defensive Player of the Year: Kamilla Cardoso, South Carolina
- Naismith Women's Defensive Player of the Year: Cameron Brink, Stanford
- Becky Hammon Mid-Major Player of the Year Award: Yvonne Ejim, Gonzaga
- Kathy Delaney-Smith Mid-Major Coach of the Year Award: Lisa Fortier, Gonzaga
- Maggie Dixon Award (top rookie head coach): Kim Caldwell, Marshall
- Academic All-American of the Year (top scholar-athlete): Caitlin Clark, Iowa
- Elite 90 Award (top GPA among upperclass players at Final Four): Sharon Goodman, Iowa
- Pat Summitt Most Courageous Award: Joye Lee-McNelis, head coach, Southern Miss

== Coaching changes ==
Many teams will change coaches during the season and after it ends.

Team	Former coach	Interim coach	New coach	Reason
Air Force	Chris Gobrecht		Stacy McIntyre	Gobrecht announced her retirement on April 1, 2024, after 9 seasons at Air Force and 43 seasons overall. Longtime Falcons associate head coach McIntyre was promoted to the position on April 25.
Alabama A&M	Margaret Richards		Dawn Thornton	Richards stepped down from her head coaching position on March 19, 2024, after 8 seasons at Alabama A&M. The Lady Bulldogs stayed in-conference for their next hire, naming Arkansas–Pine Bluff head coach Thornton as her replacement on April 6.
Appalachian State	Angel Elderkin		Alaura Sharp	Elderkin, citing personal reasons, resigned from Appalachian State on March 18, 2024, after ten seasons. The Mountaineers hired Presbyterian head coach Sharp on April 5.
Arkansas-Pine Bluff	Dawn Thornton		Erica Leak	Thornton left UAPB on April 6, 2024, after 5 seasons for the head coaching position at SWAC rival Alabama A&M. Erica Leak, who had been head coach at West Memphis HS in West Memphis, Arkansas the past year, was hired by the Golden Lions on April 25.
Binghamton	Bethann Shapiro Ord		Mary Grimes	Binghamton parted ways with Ord on March 29, 2024, after a 75–92 record in 6 seasons. Le Moyne head coach Grimes was hired by the Bearcats on April 24.
Cal State Bakersfield	Greg McCall		Ari Wideman	McCall's contract with CSUB was not renewed on March 12, 2024, ending his 13-season tenure at his alma mater. Toledo assistant coach Wideman was hired as the new head coach of the Roadrunners on May 3.
Cal State Northridge	Carlene Mitchell		Angie Ned	CSUN's athletic director announced on March 15, 2024, that Mitchell will not return to the program after 3 seasons. California Baptist associate head coach Ned was hired by the Matadors on April 29.
Canisius	Sahar Nusseibeh		Tiffany Swoffard	Nusseibeh left Canisius on March 28, 2024, after 3 seasons for the Eastern Michigan head coaching position. Penn State assistant coach Swoffard was hired by the Golden Griffins on April 17.
Charlotte	Cara Consuegra		Tomekia Reed	Consuegra left Charlotte on April 17, 2024, after 13 seasons for the Marquette head coaching job. Jackson State head coach Reed was hired by the 49ers on April 25.
Chattanooga	Shawn Poppie		Deandra Schirmer	Poppie left Chattanooga on March 26, 2024, after 2 seasons for the head coaching job at Clemson. The Mocs hired D-II Valdosta State head coach Schrimer on April 4.
Chicago State	Andrea Williams		Corry Irvin	For the 4th time in 6 years, Chicago State announced a coaching change, parting ways with Williams on February 23, 2024, after a 7–48 record in 2 seasons. Mississippi State assistant Irvin was hired by the Cougars on April 10.
Clemson	Amanda Butler		Shawn Poppie	Clemson parted ways with Butler on March 12, 2024, after 6 seasons and an 81–106 record. Chattanooga head coach Poppie was hired by the Tigers on March 26.
Cornell	Dayna Smith		Emily Garner	Cornell announced on March 11, 2024, that they had parted ways with Smith after 22 seasons. After a month-long search, the Big Red hired NCAA D-III Trinity (CT) head coach Emily Garner on April 11.
Delaware State	E.C. Hill	Jazmone Turner		Delaware State parted ways with Hill on or around June 23, 2023 after 2 seasons and named assistant Turner interim head coach for the 2023–24 season. On March 23, 2024, the Hornets removed the interim tag from Turner and officially named her head coach.
Eastern Illinois	Matt Bollant	Marqus McGlothan		Bollant left EIU on May 20, 2024, after 7 seasons to become head coach at NAIA Bryan College, where he previously was head coach from 2002 to 2007. The following day, Panthers associate head coach McGlothan was initially named interim head coach of the team for the 2024–25 season. On March 14, 2025, McGlothan's interim tag was removed and he was named head coach.
Eastern Michigan	Fred Castro	Ke'Sha Blanton	Sahar Nusseibeh	EMU announced on December 11, 2023, that it had parted ways with Castro after 7-plus seasons and an 80–129 record overall. Eagles assistant coach Blanton was named interim head coach for the rest of the season. After the season, the school hired Canisius head coach Nusseibeh on March 28, 2024.
Georgetown	Tasha Butts	Darnell Haney		Butts died on October 23, 2023, 2 weeks before her first game as Georgetown head coach, at the age of 41 following a two-year battle with breast cancer. She had been hired by the university in April from Georgia Tech and had stepped away from the program last month to focus on her health. Hoyas associate head coach Haney was named interim head coach for the season, continuing the role he was in during Butts' initial leave. On March 20, 2024, Georgetown removed Haney's interim tag and named him head coach.
Georgia Southern	Anita Howard		Hana Haden	Howard and Georgia Southern mutually agreed on a change in leadership of the program on March 12, 2024, after 5 seasons. Hana Haden, head coach at D-II Georgia Southwestern State this past season, was hired by the Eagles on March 29.
Green Bay	Kevin Borseth		Kayla Karius	Borseth announced his retirement on April 10, 2024, after 21 seasons at Green Bay and 37 overall. South Dakota head coach Karius, who played for the Phoenix from 2007 to 2011, was hired as his replacement on April 23.
Hampton	David Six		Tamisha Augustin	Six, the winningest head coach of the program, announced his retirement on March 18, 2024, after 15 seasons at Hampton. Under Six, the Lady Pirates won 264 games, 5 MEAC regular season and 6 conference tournament titles. On March 26, the school hired Florida associate head coach and Hampton, Virginia native Augustin as his replacement.
Idaho	Carrie Eighmey		Arthur Moreira	Eighmey left Idaho on April 30, 2024, after a single season for the South Dakota head coaching job. Vandals assistant Moriera was promoted to the position on June 24.
Indiana State	Chad Killinger		Marc Mitchell	Killinger stepped down from his head coaching position on April 24, 2024, after a 33–60 record in 3 seasons at Indiana State. Former Saint Peter's head coach Mitchell, who had been the head coach at D-II University of Indianapolis the past 2 years, was hired by the Sycamores on May 10.
Iowa	Lisa Bluder		Jan Jensen	Bluder announced her retirement on May 13, 2024, after 24 seasons at Iowa and 40 years overall. During her tenure at Iowa, she won 528 games, the most in program history, and led the Hawkeyes to back-to-back appearances in the national championship game in her final two seasons there. Longtime associate head coach Jansen, who played for Bluder at Drake University from 1990 to 1991 and has been an assistant under her since 1993, was named as her successor.
Jackson State	Tomekia Reed		Margaret Richards	Reed left Jackson State on April 25, 2024, after 6 seasons for the head coaching job at Charlotte. Former Alabama A&M head coach Richards was hired as the Lady Tigers' new head coach on May 1, less than a month after being named assistant coach at Mercer.
Kentucky	Kyra Elzy		Kenny Brooks	Kentucky relieved Elzy from her duties on March 11, 2024, after 4 seasons and a 61–60 record, including a 24–39 record in her final two seasons after making the NCAA tournament her first two seasons. Virginia Tech head coach Brooks was hired by the Wildcats on March 26.
Le Moyne	Mary Grimes		Nick DiPillo	Grimes departed from Le Moyne on April 24, 2024, after 3 seasons for the Binghamton head coaching job. The Dolphins hired Bowling Green assistant DiPillo as the new head coach on May 23.
Little Rock	Joe Foley		Steve Wiedower	After 21 seasons at Little Rock and 37 overall as head coach, Foley announced his retirement on July 18, 2024, with longtime Trojans assistant Wiedower being named his successor.
Marquette	Megan Duffy		Cara Consuegra	Duffy left Marquette on April 3, 2024, after 5 seasons for the Virginia Tech job. Charlotte head coach Consuegra, who was an assistant with the Golden Eagles from 2004 to 2011, was hired as her replacement on April 17.
Marshall	Kim Caldwell		Juli Fulks	Caldwell left Marshall on April 7, 2024, after 1 season for the Tennessee head coaching job. Juli Fulks, a successful Division III head coach who had been at Transylvania University for the last 10 years, was hired by the Thundering Herd on April 12.
Maryland Eastern Shore	Fred Batchelor		Malikah Willis	UMES announced a coaching search on March 22, 2024, to replace Batchelor after 19 seasons. Kennesaw State assistant coach Willis was named the new head coach of the Hawks on April 26.
Mercer	Susie Gardner		Michelle Clark-Heard	Gardner, Mercer's winningest head coach with 246 wins, resigned on March 9, 2024, after 14 seasons with the program. Michelle Clark-Heard, a former head coach at Western Kentucky and Cincinnati who was serving as the assistant athletic director for the Mississippi State women's team this season, was hired by the Bears on March 22.
Miami (FL)	Katie Meier		Tricia Cullop	Meier announced her retirement on March 21, 2024, after 19 seasons at Miami and 23 overall as head coach. Under Meier, the Hurricanes went 362–208 and appeared in the NCAA tournament 10 times. Toledo head coach Cullop was hired by the school on April 5.
Monmouth	Ginny Boggess		Cait Wetmore	Boggess left Monmouth on April 9, 2024, after 3 seasons for the Toledo head coaching position. Charlotte associate head coach Whitmore was hired by the Hawks on April 22.
Morehead State	Cayla Petree	Chris Palmer	Ashton Feldhaus	Morehead State and Petree, who would have been in her 4th season as head coach, mutually agreed to part ways sometime during the offseason, with Eagles assistant coach Palmer being named interim head coach for the 2024–25 season, but it wasn't formally announced until sometime in December 2024. On March 6, 2025, the school announced that Palmer would not be retained and a coaching search was underway. Feldhaus, head coach at D-II Missouri Western State, was hired on March 24.
New Hampshire	Kelsey Hogan		Megan Shoniker	Hogan resigned from New Hampshire on March 27, 2024, after a 28–77 record in 4 seasons. The Wildcats hired Rhode Island associate head coach Shoniker on April 24.
North Alabama	Missy Tiber		Candi Whitaker	North Alabama announced on March 11, 2024, that Tiber's contract will not be renewed after 11 seasons. Candi Whitaker, a former head coach at Kansas City and Texas Tech who was at Division II Missouri Western for the past 5 years, was hired by the Lions on March 25.
North Carolina Central	Trisha Stafford-Odom	Terrence Baxter		North Carolina Central released Stafford-Odom from her contract on September 13, 2023, after 6 seasons. Eagles assistant coach Baxter was named interim head coach of the team initially for the season. After starting the 2024–25 season with the title as the interim head coach still, Baxter officially had the interim tag removed on November 6, 2024.
Northern Kentucky	Camryn Whitaker		Jeff Hans	Following an investigation into possible coaching policy violations for which she was eventually cleared of, NKU parted ways with Whitaker on April 5, 2024, after 8 seasons and a 95–106 record. Hans, a former assistant with the Norse who had been the head coach at Division II Thomas More for the last 13 seasons, was hired as her replacement on April 22.
Pepperdine	Tim Hays	Kelsey Keizer	Katie Faulkner	Hays, who was hired by Pepperdine back in April, announced his resignation on August 14, 2023, citing a desire to be closer to his family. Waves assistant coach Keizer served as the team's interim head coach for the season. Washington assistant Faulkner was hired after the season on April 12, 2024.
Presbyterian	Alaura Sharp		Tiffany Sardin	Sharp left Presbyterian on April 5, 2024, after 6 seasons for the Appalachian State job. Former Chicago State head coach Sardin was hired by the Blue Hose on April 19.
Robert Morris	Charlie Buscaglia	Scott Schneider	Chandler McCabe	Buscaglia announced his resignation from RMU on February 12, 2024, after 7½ seasons and a 127–102 record. Colonials associate head coach Schneider served as the interim head coach for the rest of the season. On March 18, UCF assistant coach McCabe was hired by the university.
Siena	Jim Jabir		Terry Primm	Jabir announced his retirement on March 26, 2024, after 6 overall seasons at Siena (1st stint from 1987 to 1990) and 35 years as head coach. Saints top assistant coach Primm was promoted to fill the position on April 5.
South Dakota	Kayla Karius		Carrie Eighmey	Karius left South Dakota on April 23, 2024, after 2 seasons to take the head coaching job at her alma mater Green Bay. Idaho head coach Eighmey was hired by the Coyotes as her replacement on April 30.
Southeast Missouri State	Rekha Patterson		Briley Palmer	Patterson resigned from SEMO on May 3, 2024, after 9 seasons to become an assistant coach at UCF. Palmer, head coach at NJCAA Mineral Area College the last 4 years, was hired by the Redhawks on April 15.
Stanford	Tara VanDerveer		Kate Paye	VanDerveer, at the time the all-time winningest head coach in all of college basketball, announced her retirement on April 9, 2024, after 38 seasons at Stanford and 45 years overall. During her illustrious career, she won 1,216 games, made the NCAA tournament 39 times, including 3 national championships and making the Final Four 13 times, along with many other accolades. Longtime Cardinal associate head coach Kate Paye, who played for VanDerveer at Stanford from 1991 to 1995, was officially announced as her successor on April 16.
Stony Brook	Ashley Langford		Joy McCorvey	Langford left Stony Brook on April 2, 2024, after 3 seasons for the head coaching position at her alma mater Tulane. Tennessee assistant coach McCorvey was hired by the Seawolves on April 15.
Tennessee	Kellie Harper		Kim Caldwell	Tennessee parted ways with Harper on April 1, 2024, after 5 seasons and a 108–52 record. Marshall head coach Caldwell was hired by the Lady Vols on April 7, making her the first non-Tennessee alum since the late great Pat Summitt to lead the program.
Tennessee State	Ty Evans		Candice Dupree	Evans resigned on April 3, 2024, after a 34–78 record in 4 seasons at TSU. Former WNBA star Candice Dupree, who had been working for the San Antonio Spurs as a player development assistant coach, was hired by the Lady Tigers on May 9.
Toledo	Tricia Cullop		Ginny Boggess	Cullop left Toledo on April 5, 2024, after 16 seasons for the Miami (FL) head coaching job. Monmouth head coach Ginny Boggess was hired by the Rockets on April 9.
Tulane	Lisa Stockton		Ashley Langford	Stockton announced her retirement on March 18, 2024, after 30 seasons at Tulane. She left as the program's winningest head coach and as the all-time winningest women's basketball coach in the state of Louisiana with 591 wins. Stony Brook head coach and Tulane alum Langford was hired by the Green Wave on April 2.
UC Santa Barbara	Bonnie Henrickson		Renee Jimenez	Henrickson announced her retirement on March 20, 2024, after 9 seasons at UCSB and 27 years overall as a head coach. Jimenez, head coach at Cal State San Marcos of NCAA D-II, was hired by the Gauchos on April 17.
UMBC	Johnetta Hayes		Candice Hill	UMBC declined to renew the contract of Hayes on March 11, 2024, after 5 seasons and a 39–81 record. St. John's associate head coach and recruiting coordinator Hill, a Baltimore native, was hired by the Retrievers on April 15.
UNC Asheville	Honey Brown		Tynesha Lewis	Brown's contract with UNC Asheville was not renewed on March 19, 2024, after a 43–76 record in 4 seasons. Tynesha Lewis, head coach at Division II Elizabeth City State the past 3 seasons, was hired by the Bulldogs on April 12.
Utah State	Kayla Ard		Wesley Brooks	Moments after losing to Boise State in the first round of the Mountain West tournament on March 10, 2024, Utah State fired Ard after a 24–90 record in 4 seasons. Ohio State assistant coach Brooks was hired by the Aggies on April 1.
Virginia Tech	Kenny Brooks		Megan Duffy	Brooks left Virginia Tech on March 26, 2024, after 8 seasons for the Kentucky job. The Hokies hired Marquette head coach Duffy as his replacement on April 3.
Western Carolina	Kiley Hill		Jonathan Tsipis	After a 33–111 record in 5 seasons, Western Carolina opted not to renew Hill's contract on March 8, 2024. Former George Washington and Wisconsin head coach Tsipis was hired by the Catamounts on April 5.
Youngstown State	John Barnes	John Nicolais	Melissa Jackson	Barnes announced his resignation from Youngstown State on January 19, 2024, after 10 seasons. He had been on a leave of absence from the program since October for family reasons. Penguins assistant coach Nicolais, who had been serving as the interim head coach during Barnes' initial leave, continued in that role through the rest of the season. On March 14, the school hired Cleveland State assistant and former Akron head coach Melissa Jackson for the job.

== See also ==
- 2023–24 NCAA Division I men's basketball season
