= Patricia Hoskins =

American basketball player

Patricia Hoskins (born February 19, 1967, in Greenville, Mississippi) is a retired collegiate basketball player, who holds the NCAA Division I women's basketball record for points per game in a season (33.6 ppg), and held the record for points scored in a career from 1989 to 2001 (broken by Jackie Stiles).

== College ==
Hoskins attended Mississippi Valley State University, where she earned All-Conference honors each of the four years she played for the Devilettes. She is only the second woman in NCAA history to lead the division for scoring and rebounds for a season, accomplishing this in 1989. Her scoring average of 33.6 points per game that year is an NCAA Division 1 record.

Hoskins scored a total of 3,122 points in her career, setting the NCAA Division 1 record at the time, and passing Drake University's Lorri Bauman, who had established a record in 1984 with 3,115 points. Hoskins did not realize she had set the record at the time, and would not realize it until informed by the sports information director after the game. Her record would stand until 2001, when Jackie Stiles surpassed it with Hoskins in the audience.

On February 13, 1989, Hoskins scored 55 points in a game against Southern University. That scoring mark is the fifth highest scoring total in NCAA Division I history. Less than two weeks later, on February 25, 1989, she tied her mark with 55 points against Alabama State.

In addition to scoring, Hoskins was a prolific rebounder. Her career rebounding average is 15.1 per game which ranks second among all Division 1 women basketball players.

Hoskins was inducted into the Southwestern Athletic Conference Hall of Fame on November 30, 2001, and the Mississippi Valley State University Athletic Hall of Fame in 2006.

=== Mississippi Valley State University statistics ===
Legend
GP	Games played	GS	Games started	MPG	Minutes per game	FG%	Field goal percentage	3P%	3-point field goal percentage
FT%	Free throw percentage	RPG	Rebounds per game	APG	Assists per game	SPG	Steals per game	BPG	Blocks per game
TO	Turnovers per game	PPG	Points per game	**Bold**	Career high	*	Led Division I

Year	Team	GP	Points	FG%	3P%	FT%	RPG	APG	SPG	BPG	PPG
1986	Mississippi Valley State University	26	651	.500	NA	.723	14.5	**2.3**	NA	NA	25.0
1987	Mississippi Valley State University	28	757	**.569**	NA	.660	17.0	2.1	NA	NA	27.0
1988	Mississippi Valley State University	**29**	810	.539	**.367**	**.756**	12.7	1.9	2.4	**1.3**	27.9
1989	Mississippi Valley State University	27	**908**	.505	.265	.748	***16.3**	1.5	**2.7**	1.3	***33.6**
Career		110	3,126	.527	.304	.721	15.1	2.0	1.3	0.7	28.4

== See also ==
- List of NCAA Division I women's basketball players with 2,500 points and 1,000 rebounds
- List of NCAA Division I women's basketball players with 1400 rebounds
- List of NCAA Division I women's basketball career scoring leaders
- List of NCAA Division I women's basketball season scoring leaders
