= Wanda Ford =

American basketball player

Personal information
- Born: c. 1964

Career information
- College: Drake (1982–1986)

Career highlights
- Kodak All-American (1986); 2x MVC Player of the Year (1985, 1986); 4x First-team All-MVC (1983–1986); No. 33 retired by Drake Bulldogs

Wanda Ford (born c. 1964) is an American former basketball player for the Drake Bulldogs. She was the first woman in NCAA history to collect 1,500 rebounds and set the NCAA career record with 1,887 rebounds. She also played 16 years of professional basketball in Brazil, Italy, Spain, France, Sweden and Israel.

Ford played in 117 games at Drake from 1983 to 1986 and finished her career with 1,887 rebounds and 2,636 points. She set several NCAA rebounding records, including: (1) 15.5 rebounds per game from 1983 to 1986 (still the NCAA record), (2) 1,887 career rebounds (broken by Courtney Paris in 2009), and (3) 534 rebounds in 1985 (broken by Courtney Paris in 2009). Her average of 17.8 rebounds per game in 1985 still ranks as the second highest single season average of all time.

Ford was also one of the leading scorers in the game. She set the NCAA single-season scoring record with 919 points in 1986 (now eighth all time). Her average of 30.6 points per game in 1986 was the second highest at that time (now fifth all time). She also scored 54 points in a February 22, 1986 game against Missouri State, which was the second highest single-game scoring total up to that time (now tied for seventh all time).

Ford grew up in a housing project in Cleveland, Ohio. After graduating from Drake, she played 16 years of professional basketball in Brazil, Italy, Spain (Font Vella Manresa), France, Sweden and Israel. She later returned to Cleveland where she worked with children with behavioral problems.

In 2003, Ford was inducted into the Des Moines Sunday Register's Iowa Sports Hall of Fame.

== Drake statistics ==
Legend
GP	Games played	GS	Games started	MPG	Minutes per game
FG%	Field goal percentage	3P%	3-point field goal percentage	FT%	Free throw percentage
RPG	Rebounds per game	APG	Assists per game	SPG	Steals per game
BPG	Blocks per game	PPG	Points per game	**Bold**	Career high

Year	Team	GP	Points	FG%	FT%	PPG
1982–83	Drake	28	450	.606	.611	16.1
1983–84	Drake	29	540	**.622**	**.744**	18.6
1984–85	Drake	**30**	727	.514	.562	24.2
1985–86	Drake	**30**	**919**	.537	.732	**30.6**
Career		117	2,636	.556	.681	22.5

== See also ==
- List of NCAA Division I women's basketball career rebounding leaders
- List of NCAA Division I women's basketball season scoring leaders
- List of NCAA Division I women's basketball players with 2,500 points and 1,000 rebounds
