= Idaho Athletic Hall of Fame =

Sports hall of fame in the United States

The Idaho Athletic Hall of Fame is a sports hall of fame in the U.S. state of Idaho. According to the hall, its purpose is "to honor those individuals from the state of Idaho who have achieved significant recognition in an area of athletic endeavor, or have made a special contribution to Idaho athletics." The 2016 class, inducted in March at the 54th annual North Idaho Sports Banquet, included high school softball coach Larry Bieber, high school basketball coach Sally Greene, football player Marvin Washington, college football assistant coach Bob McCray, and high school track coach Bob Squires.

Inducted in 2015 were basketball player Orlando Lightfoot, high school football coach Van Troxel, basketball player Mindy Madsen, and high school sports contributor Bob "Marz" Marzulli. Six were inducted in the 2014 class: football player Merril Hoge, college football coach Keith Gilbertson, high school football player Mike Cox, football player Ryan Phillips, James "Doc" Lynn Jr., and high school coach Gary "Big Daddy" Rasmussen.
