= Mississippi Valley State Devilettes basketball =

| 2025–26 Mississippi Valley State Devilettes basketball team |
- University: Mississippi Valley State University
- Head coach: Jason James (1st season)
- Location: Itta Bena, Mississippi
- Arena: Harrison HPER Complex (capacity: 5,000)
- Conference: SWAC
- Nickname: Devilettes
- Colors: Forest green and white

Conference tournament champions
- 1987, 1993

Conference regular-season champions
- 1988, 2012

Uniforms
| Home | Away |

The Mississippi Valley State Devilettes basketball team represents Mississippi Valley State University in Itta Bena, Mississippi, in NCAA Division I competition. The school's team competes in the Southwestern Athletic Conference and plays home games in the Harrison HPER Complex.

== History ==
The Devilettes have never made the NCAA Tournament, but they did play in the 2012 WNIT, losing 68–61 to Tulane in the First Round.

=== Postseason appearances ===
| Year | Round | Opponent | Result |
|---|---|---|---|
| 2012 | NIT First Round | Tulane | L 61–68 |
