= 2023–24 Seton Hall Pirates women's basketball team =

Intercollegiate basketball season

2023–24 Seton Hall Pirates women's basketball

WBIT, First Round
- Conference: Big East Conference
- Record: 17–15 (8–10 Big East)
- Head coach: Anthony Bozzella (11th season)
- Assistant coaches: Jose Rebimbas; Cassandra Callaway; Ka-Deidre Simmons
- Home arena: Walsh Gymnasium

2023–24 Big East women's basketball standings
	Conf.				Overall
Team	W		L	PCT	W		L	PCT
No. 3 UConn †	18	–	0	1.000	33	–	6	.846
No. 23 Creighton	15	–	3	.833	26	–	6	.813
St. John's	11	–	7	.611	18	–	15	.545
Villanova	11	–	7	.611	22	–	13	.629
Marquette	11	–	7	.611	23	–	9	.719
Georgetown	9	–	9	.500	23	–	12	.657
Seton Hall	8	–	10	.444	17	–	15	.531
Butler	6	–	12	.333	15	–	17	.469
Providence	6	–	12	.333	13	–	21	.382
DePaul	4	–	14	.222	12	–	20	.375
Xavier	0	–	18	.000	1	–	27	.036
† 2024 Big East tournament winner Rankings from AP poll

The 2023–24 Seton Hall Pirates women's basketball team represented Seton Hall University during the 2023–24 NCAA Division I women's basketball season. The Pirates, led by eleventh-year head coach Anthony Bozzella, played their home games in South Orange, New Jersey at the Walsh Gymnasium as members of the Big East Conference.

== Previous season ==
The Pirates finished the season 19–14, 10–10 in Big East play to finish sixth place. They defeated Xavier in the first round of the Big East women's tournament before losing to Creighton in the quarterfinals. They were invited to the WNIT, where they defeated Saint Joseph's in round 1 before losing to Syracuse in round 2.

== Offseason ==
=== Departures ===
Seton Hall departures
Name	Num	Pos.	Height	Year	Hometown	Reason for departure
Alexia Allesch	0	F	6'1"	GS senior	Basking Ridge, NJ	Graduated
Lauren Park-Lane	3	G	5'3"	Senior	Wilmington, DE	Graduate transferred to Mississippi State
Jala Jordan	4	F	6'2"	GS senior	Philadelphia, PA	Graduated
Mya Bembry	10	F	6'1"	Senior	Orange, NJ	Graduate transferred to Georgetown
Sidney Cooks	14	F/C	6'4"	GS senior	Kenosha, WI	Graduated
Victoria Keenan	23	G	5'7"	Senior	Bethlehem, PA	Graduate transferred to Stony Brook
Allie Palmieri	24	G	5'10"	Sophomore	Trumbull, CT	Transferred to Boston College
Kailah Harris	33	F/C	6'1"	Senior	Ossining, NY	Graduate transferred to Fordham

=== Incoming transfers ===
Seton Hall incoming transfers
Name	Num	Pos.	Height	Year	Hometown	Previous school
Makennah White	0	F	6'2"	Senior	Farrell, PA	UMass
I'yanna Lops	2	F	6'3"	GS senior	Stamford, CT	St. Bonaventure
Micah Gray	3	G	5'8"	Sophomore	Oklahoma City, OK	Texas Southern
Shannon Mulroy	10	G	5'8"	GS senior	Mount Laurel, NJ	Cornell
Kae Satterfield	13	G	6'0"	GS senior	New York, NY	Xavier
Brazil Harvey-Carr	23	F	6'1"	GS senior	Camden, NJ	Manhattan
A'Jah Davis	25	F	6'1"	GS senior	DeKalb, IL	Northern Illinois

==== Recruiting ====
There was no recruiting class of 2023.

== Roster ==
2023–24 Seton Hall Pirates women's basketball team
Players
Coaches

Pos.	#	Name	Height	Year	Previous school	Hometown
F	0	Makennah White	6 ft 2 in (1.88 m)	Sr	West Middlesex; UMass	Farrell, PA
G	1	Sha'Lynn Hagans	5 ft 6 in (1.68 m)	GS	Osbourn Park; Penn State	Manassas, VA
G	2	I'yanna Lops	6 ft 3 in (1.91 m)	GS	Trinity Catholic; St. Bonaventure	Stamford, CT
G	3	Micah Gray	5 ft 8 in (1.73 m)	So	Classen SAS; Texas Southern	Oklahoma City, OK
G	5	Savannah Catalon	5 ft 8 in (1.73 m)	Fr	Mansfield Legacy	Burleson, TX
G	10	Shannon Mulroy	5 ft 8 in (1.73 m)	GS	Lenape; Cornell	Mount Laurel, NJ
G/F	13	Kae Satterfield	6 ft 0 in (1.83 m)	GS	Christ the King; Xavier	New York, NY
G	15	Azana Baines	6 ft 1 in (1.85 m)	GS	Gloucester Catholic; Virginia Tech	Blackwood, NJ
F	20	Sydnee Eggleton	5 ft 11 in (1.8 m)	Fr	Peddie School	Thomaston, CT
G/F	21	Shailyn Pinkney	5 ft 10 in (1.78 m)	So	East Hartford	East Hartford, CT
G	22	Amari Wright	5 ft 9 in (1.75 m)	Sr	Sandalwood	Jacksonville, FL
F	23	Brazil Harvey-Carr	6 ft 1 in (1.85 m)	GS	Leap Academy; Manhattan	Camden, NJ
F	24	Joniyah Bland-Fitzpatrick	5 ft 10 in (1.78 m)	Fr	Westtown School	New London, CT
F/C	25	A'Jah Davis	6 ft 1 in (1.85 m)	GS	Montverde Academy; Northern Illinois	DeKalb, IL

Head coach

- Anthony Bozzella (Seton Hall)

Assistant coach(es)

- Jose Rebimbas (Seton Hall)
- Cassandra Callaway (Albany)
- Ka-Deidre Simmons (Seton Hall)

Legend

- (C) Team captain
- (S) Suspended
- (I) Ineligible
- (W) Walk-on
- Injured
- Current redshirt

Roster

== Schedule and results ==
Date time, TV	Rank^{#}	Opponent^{#}	Result	Record	High points	High rebounds	High assists	Site (attendance) city, state
Exhibition
November 2, 2023*; 7:00 p.m.		St. Thomas Aquinas	W 79–38		12 – Catalon	8 – Davis	3 – Tied	Walsh Gymnasium (411); South Orange, NJ
Non-conference regular season
November 7, 2023*; 7:00 p.m., FloSports		Iona	W 75–32	1–0	11 – Gray	8 – White	6 – Wright	Walsh Gymnasium (757); South Orange, NJ
November 10, 2023*; 7:00 p.m., ESPN+		at Columbia	L 61–72	1–1	14 – Baines	8 – Baines	2 – Tied	Levien Gymnasium (1,011); New York, NY
November 12, 2023*; 1:00 p.m., FloSports		Bryant	W 73–45	2–1	22 – Gray	5 – Tied	8 – Wright	Walsh Gymnasium (565); South Orange, NJ
November 15, 2023*; 7:00 p.m., FloSports		Rutgers	W 82–63	3–1	25 – Baines	10 – Davis	12 – Wright	Walsh Gymnasium (822); South Orange, NJ
November 20, 2023*; 9:00 p.m., FloSports		vs. No. 8 USC; Baha Mar Pink Flamingo Championship	L 54–64	3–2	16 – Baines	6 – Baines	6 – Wright	Baha Mar Convention Center (409); Nassau, Bahamas
November 22, 2023*; 11:00 a.m., FloSports		vs. East Carolina; Baha Mar Pink Flamingo Championship	W 68–57	4–2	24 – Baines	10 – Davis	7 – Wright	Baha Mar Convention Center; Nassau, Bahamas
November 29, 2023*; 7:00 p.m., ESPN+		at No. 25 Princeton	L 71–75 ^{2OT}	4–3	24 – Gray	11 – Baines	7 – Wright	Jadwin Gymnasium (933); Princeton, NJ
December 2, 2023*; 1:00 p.m., FloSports		Maryland Eastern Shore	W 78–54	5–3	17 – Tied	6 – Tied	10 – Wright	Walsh Gymnasium (777); South Orange, NJ
December 8, 2023*; 7:00 p.m., FloSports		Central Connecticut	W 77–46	6–3	17 – Gray	11 – Davis	3 – Wright	Walsh Gymnasium (537); South Orange, NJ
December 11, 2023*; 7:00 p.m., FloSports		Fairleigh Dickinson	W 67–27	7–3	17 – Gray	10 – Pinkney	4 – Wright	Walsh Gymnasium (681); South Orange, NJ
December 16, 2023*; 1:00 p.m., FloSports		No. 23 UNLV	W 84–54	8–3	23 – Baines	11 – Baines	8 – Wright	Walsh Gymnasium (522); South Orange, NJ
Big East regular season
December 20, 2023; 11:00 a.m., FloSports		at Georgetown	W 57–49	9–3 (1–0)	14 – Baines	6 – Tied	4 – Tied	McDonough Gymnasium (697); Washington, D.C.
December 30, 2023; 2:00 p.m., FloSports		Providence	L 46–51	9–4 (1–1)	15 – Baines	8 – White	4 – Wright	Walsh Gymnasium (748); South Orange, NJ
January 3, 2024; 7:00 p.m., FloSports		Villanova	L 45–50	9–5 (1–2)	21 – Baines	7 – Tied	4 – Wright	Walsh Gymnasium (845); South Orange, NJ
January 6, 2024; 2:00 p.m., FloSports		at Butler	W 64–50	10–5 (2–2)	17 – Catalon	8 – Davis	9 – Wright	Hinkle Fieldhouse (979); Indianapolis, IN
January 9, 2024; 8:30 p.m., FS1		No. 23 Marquette	L 54–75	10–6 (2–3)	16 – Gray	7 – Lops	7 – Wright	Walsh Gymnasium (336); South Orange, NJ
January 13, 2024; 4:00 p.m., FS1		at Xavier	W 61–47	11–6 (3–3)	14 – Baines	8 – Baines	5 – Wright	Cintas Center (697); Cincinnati, OH
January 17, 2024; 8:30 p.m., SNY		No. 9 UConn	L 59–83	11–7 (3–4)	17 – Baines	6 – Baines	8 – Wright	Walsh Gymnasium (1,296); South Orange, NJ
January 22, 2024; 6:30 p.m., FS1		St. John's	W 74–66 ^{OT}	12–7 (4–4)	17 – Baines	13 – Baines	10 – Wright	Walsh Gymnasium (1,029); South Orange, NJ
January 28, 2024; 2:00 p.m., CBSSN		at No. 21 Creighton	L 49–57	12–8 (4–5)	19 – Baines	10 – Lops	4 – Satterfield	D. J. Sokol Arena (1,773); Omaha, NE
January 31, 2024; 7:00 p.m., FloSports		Georgetown	W 71–54	13–8 (5–5)	17 – Satterfield	6 – Satterfield	5 – Satterfield	Walsh Gymnasium (919); South Orange, NJ
February 3, 2024; 2:00 p.m., FloSports		at Villanova	L 41–69	13–9 (5–6)	10 – Baines	4 – Tied	1 – Tied	Finneran Pavilion (2,881); Villanova, PA
February 7, 2024; 7:00 p.m., SNY		at No. 11 UConn	L 34–67	13–10 (5–7)	9 – Lops	6 – Baines	2 – Tied	XL Center (14,138); Hartford, CT
February 10, 2024; 1:00 p.m., FloSports		Xavier	W 86–62	14–10 (6–7)	21 – Catalon	7 – White	6 – Catalon	Walsh Gymnasium (1,104); South Orange, NJ
February 13, 2024; 7:00 p.m., FloSports		at St. John's	L 57–68	14–11 (6–8)	12 – Catalon	9 – Satterfield	6 – Wright	Carnesecca Arena (284); Queens, NY
February 17, 2024; 1:00 p.m., FloSports		DePaul	W 91–78	15–11 (7–8)	21 – Gray	8 – Baines	5 – Satterfield	Walsh Gymnasium (1,065); South Orange, NJ
February 20, 2024; 8:00 p.m., FloSports		at Marquette	L 62–68	15–12 (7–9)	19 – Baines	7 – Catalon	4 – Catalon	Al McGuire Center (1,398); Milwaukee, WI
February 28, 2024; 7:00 p.m., FloSports		at Providence	W 71–65	16–12 (8–9)	22 – Baines	8 – Satterfield	3 – Tied	Alumni Hall (579); Providence, RI
March 3, 2024; 3:00 p.m., FS1		No. 23 Creighton	L 65–72	16–13 (8–10)	23 – Baines	9 – Tied	6 – Wright	Walsh Gymnasium (1,040); South Orange, NJ
Big East Women's Tournament
March 8, 2024; 2:30 p.m., FloSports	(7)	vs. (10) DePaul; First Round	W 71–64	17–13	17 – Baines	8 – Satterfield	5 – Wright	Mohegan Sun Arena; Uncasville, CT
March 9, 2024; 7:00 p.m., FS2	(7)	vs. (2) No. 21 Creighton; Quarterfinals	L 65–72	17–14	15 – Gray	5 – Tied	7 – Catalon	Mohegan Sun Arena; Uncasville, CT
WBIT
March 21, 2024*; 7:00 p.m., ESPN+		at (3) Saint Joseph's; First Round	L 47–54	17–15	14 – Satterfield	6 – Baines	3 – Catalon	Hagan Arena (540); Philadelphia, PA
*Non-conference game. ^{#}Rankings from AP Poll. (#) Tournament seedings in parentheses. All times are in Eastern Time.

== Rankings ==
Ranking movements Legend: ██ Increase in ranking ██ Decrease in ranking — = Not ranked RV = Received votes
	Week																				
Poll	Pre	1	2	3	4	5	6	7	8	9	10	11	12	13	14	15	16	17	18	19	Final
AP	—	—*	—	—	—	—	—	—	—												Not released
Coaches	—	—	—	—	—	—	—	—	RV												

*The preseason and week 1 polls were the same.

== See also ==
- 2023–24 Seton Hall Pirates men's basketball team
