= 2023–24 Cornell Big Red women's basketball team =

American college basketball season

2023–24 Cornell Big Red women's basketball
- Conference: Ivy League
- Record: 7–19 (1–13 Ivy)
- Head coach: Dayna Smith (22nd season)
- Associate head coach: Val Klopfer
- Assistant coaches: Victoria Lux; Brendon Gauthier
- Home arena: Newman Arena

2023–24 Ivy League women's basketball standings
	Conf.				Overall
Team	W		L	PCT	W		L	PCT
Princeton †	13	–	1	.929	25	–	5	.833
Columbia	13	–	1	.929	23	–	7	.767
Harvard	9	–	5	.643	16	–	12	.571
Penn	7	–	7	.500	15	–	13	.536
Brown	7	–	7	.500	16	–	11	.593
Yale	5	–	9	.357	8	–	19	.296
Cornell	1	–	13	.071	7	–	19	.269
Dartmouth	1	–	13	.071	7	–	19	.269
† 2024 Ivy League tournament winner

The 2023–24 Cornell Big Red women's basketball team represented Cornell University during the 2023–24 NCAA Division I women's basketball season. The Big Red, led by 22nd-year head coach Dayna Smith, played their home games at Newman Arena in Ithaca, New York, as members of the Ivy League.

The Big Red finished the season 7–19, 1–13 in Ivy League play, to finish in a tie for seventh (last) place. They failed to qualify for the Ivy League tournament, as only the top four teams qualify.

On March 11, 2024, the school announced that they would be parting ways with head coach Dayna Smith, ending her 21-year tenure with the school. On April 12, the school announced that they would be hiring Trinity College head coach Emily Garner as the team's new head coach.

== Previous season ==
The Big Red finished the 2022–23 season 10–17, 3–11 in Ivy League play, to finish in seventh place. They failed to qualify for the Ivy League tournament.

== Roster ==
2023–24 Cornell Big Red women's basketball team
Players
Coaches

Pos.	#	Name	Height	Year	Previous school	Hometown
G	2	Val Garcia-Martinez	5 ft 8 in (1.73 m)	Sr	McAllen Memorial High School	McAllen, TX
G/F	3	Vivienne Knee	5 ft 9 in (1.75 m)	So	Lycée Français de New York	New York, NY
G	4	Sarah Hathorn	5 ft 4 in (1.63 m)	So	A&M Consolidated High School	College Station, TX
G/F	5	Rachel Kaus	6 ft 0 in (1.83 m)	Fr	Lake Forest High School	Lake Bluff, IL
G	10	Azareya Kilgoe	5 ft 4 in (1.63 m)	Fr	Sanford School	Seaford, DE
F	11	Arianna Linoxilakis	6 ft 1 in (1.85 m)	Jr	Weston High School	Weston, MA
G	12	Mia Beam	5 ft 8 in (1.73 m)	Sr	Christian Academy of Louisville	Louisville, KY
F	13	Jada Davis	6 ft 2 in (1.88 m)	Jr	The Bishop's School	San Diego, CA
C	15	Maya Watts	6 ft 1 in (1.85 m)	Fr	Arlington High School	Hopewell Junction, NY
G	20	Kaya Ingram	5 ft 8 in (1.73 m)	Sr	La Cueva High School	Albuquerque, NM
G	22	Clarke Jackson	5 ft 9 in (1.75 m)	Fr	Gahanna Lincoln High School	Columbus, OH
G	23	Kameryn Perry	5 ft 10 in (1.78 m)	Fr	Choate Rosemary Hall	Middletown, CT
F	24	Summer Parker-Hall	6 ft 0 in (1.83 m)	Jr	Loyola Academy	Chicago, IL
G/F	25	Lexi Green	5 ft 9 in (1.75 m)	Jr	Pittsford Mendon High School	Pittsford, NY
F	31	Emily Pape	6 ft 1 in (1.85 m)	So	Maine South High School	Park Ridge, IL

Head coach

- Dayna Smith (Rhode Island)

Assistant coach(es)

- Val Klopfer (Wake Forest)
- Victoria Lux (Bentley)
- Brendon Gauthier (Cornell)

Legend

- (C) Team captain
- (S) Suspended
- (I) Ineligible
- (W) Walk-on
- Injured
- Current redshirt

Roster
Last update: February 13, 2024

== Schedule and results ==
Date time, TV	Rank^{#}	Opponent^{#}	Result	Record	Site (attendance) city, state
Non-conference regular season
November 7, 2023*; 7:00 p.m., ESPN+		at Colgate	L 60–71	0–1	Cotterell Court (353); Hamilton, NY
November 11, 2023*; 3:00 p.m., ESPN+		at Southern Illinois	W 80–77	1–1	Banterra Center (680); Carbondale, IL
November 13, 2023*; 6:30 p.m., ESPN+		at Western Kentucky	L 56–62	1–2	E. A. Diddle Arena (1,032); Bowling Green, KY
November 18, 2023*; 5:00 p.m., ESPN+		at Mount St. Mary's	W 52–47	2–2	Knott Arena (1,163); Emmitsburg, MD
November 22, 2023*; 2:00 p.m., ESPN+		Albany	L 45–57	2–3	Newman Arena (278); Ithaca, NY
November 26, 2023*; 1:00 p.m., B1G+		at No. 15 Ohio State	L 40–83	2–4	Value City Arena (5,695); Columbus, OH
November 29, 2023*; 6:07 p.m., ESPN+		at Binghamton	W 58–57	3–4	Binghamton University Events Center (927); Vestal, NY
December 2, 2023*; 2:00 p.m., ESPN+		at Bucknell	W 58–53	4–4	Sojka Pavilion (319); Lewisburg, PA
December 5, 2023*; 7:00 p.m., ESPN+		St. Bonaventure	W 55–53	5–4	Newman Arena (112); Ithaca, NY
December 18, 2023*; 7:00 p.m., ACCNX		at Syracuse	L 77–78	5–5	JMA Wireless Dome (1,772); Syracuse, NY
December 21, 2023*; 2:00 p.m., ESPN+		Marist	W 74–61	6–5	Newman Arena (684); Ithaca, NY
December 30, 2023*; 1:00 p.m., ESPN+		Stony Brook	L 56–81	6–6	Newman Arena (473); Ithaca, NY
Ivy League regular season
January 6, 2024; 2:00 p.m., ESPN+		Princeton	L 38–79	6–7 (0–1)	Newman Arena (–); Ithaca, NY
January 13, 2024; 2:00 p.m., ESPN+		at Columbia	L 53–82	6–8 (0–2)	Levien Gymnasium (1,098); New York, NY
January 15, 2024; 2:00 p.m., ESPN+		at Penn	L 54–67	6–9 (0–3)	The Palestra (982); Philadelphia, PA
January 20, 2024; 2:00 p.m., ESPN+		Brown	L 53–64	6–10 (0–4)	Newman Arena (431); Ithaca, NY
January 27, 2024; 2:00 p.m., ESPN+		at Princeton	L 47–85	6–11 (0–5)	Jadwin Gymnasium (1,104); Princeton, NJ
February 2, 2024; 6:00 p.m., ESPN+		Dartmouth	W 61–47	7–11 (1–5)	Newman Arena (273); Ithaca, NY
February 3, 2024; 5:00 p.m., ESPN+		Harvard	L 52–63	7–12 (1–6)	Newman Arena (583); Ithaca, NY
February 10, 2024; 2:00 p.m., ESPN+		Yale	L 59–66	7–13 (1–7)	Newman Arena (183); Ithaca, NY
February 16, 2024; 6:00 p.m., ESPN+		at Harvard	L 51–74	7–14 (1–8)	Lavietes Pavilion (762); Cambridge, MA
February 17, 2024; 4:00 p.m., ESPN+		at Dartmouth	L 44–48	7–15 (1–9)	Leede Arena (660); Hanover, NH
February 24, 2024; 2:00 p.m., ESPN+		Penn	L 54–61	7–16 (1–10)	Newman Arena (341); Ithaca, NY
March 1, 2024; 4:00 p.m., ESPN+		at Yale	L 72–79	7–17 (1–11)	John J. Lee Amphitheater (447); New Haven, CT
March 2, 2024; 3:00 p.m., ESPN+		at Brown	L 66–75	7–18 (1–12)	Pizzitola Sports Center (364); Providence, RI
March 9, 2024; 2:00 p.m., ESPN+		Columbia	L 46–82	7–19 (1–13)	Newman Arena (538); Ithaca, NY
*Non-conference game. ^{#}Rankings from AP poll. (#) Tournament seedings in parentheses. All times are in Eastern.
