= 2023–24 Dartmouth Big Green women's basketball team =

American college basketball season

2023–24 Dartmouth Big Green women's basketball
- Conference: Ivy League
- Record: 7–19 (1–13 Ivy)
- Head coach: Linda Cimino (1st season)
- Assistant coaches: Robert Isme; Kerri Reaves; Anh-Dao Tran
- Home arena: Leede Arena

2023–24 Ivy League women's basketball standings
	Conf.				Overall
Team	W		L	PCT	W		L	PCT
Princeton †	13	–	1	.929	25	–	5	.833
Columbia	13	–	1	.929	23	–	7	.767
Harvard	9	–	5	.643	16	–	12	.571
Penn	7	–	7	.500	15	–	13	.536
Brown	7	–	7	.500	16	–	11	.593
Yale	5	–	9	.357	8	–	19	.296
Cornell	1	–	13	.071	7	–	19	.269
Dartmouth	1	–	13	.071	7	–	19	.269
† 2024 Ivy League tournament winner

The 2023–24 Dartmouth Big Green women's basketball team represented Dartmouth College during the 2023–24 NCAA Division I women's basketball season. The Big Green, led by first-year head coach Linda Cimino, played their home games at Leede Arena in Hanover, New Hampshire as members of the Ivy League.

== Previous season ==
The Big Green finished the 2022–23 season 2–26, 0–14 in Ivy League play, to finish in last (eighth) place. They failed to qualify for the Ivy League tournament.

On April 17, 2023, head coach Adrienne Shibles announced that she would be stepping down after only two seasons as head coach. A little over a month later, on May 23, the school announced the hiring of St. Francis Brooklyn head coach Linda Cimino as the Big Green's next head coach.

== Roster ==
2023–24 Dartmouth Big Green women's basketball team
Players
Coaches

Pos.	#	Name	Height	Year	Previous school	Hometown
G	1	Nina Minicozzi	5 ft 8 in (1.73 m)	Fr	Rivers School	Belmont, MA
G	2	Meena Tate	5 ft 11 in (1.8 m)	Fr	Iowa City West High School	Iowa City, IA
G	3	Mekkena Boyd	5 ft 8 in (1.73 m)	Sr	Penn State	Williston, VT
F	4	Cate MacDonald	6 ft 1 in (1.85 m)	Fr	New Hampton School	Lynnfield, MA
G	5	Mia Curtis	5 ft 9 in (1.75 m)	Sr	Minnehaha Academy	Minneapolis, MN
F	10	Olivia Lawlor	6 ft 1 in (1.85 m)	So	Summit High School	Summit, NJ
G	11	Camryn Foltz (C)	5 ft 10 in (1.78 m)	Sr	Colts Neck High School	Sea Bright, NJ
G/F	12	Carrington Washburn	6 ft 0 in (1.83 m)	Sr	Christ Presbyterian Academy	Brentwood, TN
F	13	Clare Meyer	6 ft 3 in (1.91 m)	So	Germantown Friends School	Philadelphia, PA
F	14	Doreen Ariik (C)	6 ft 4 in (1.93 m)	Jr	Northfield Mount Hermon School	Nairobi, Kenya
G	15	Victoria Page (C)	5 ft 8 in (1.73 m)	Jr	Blackman High School	Murfreesboro, TN
G	20	Brooke Hollawell	5 ft 9 in (1.75 m)	So	Manasquan High School	Wall, NJ
F	21	Lucija Banovic	6 ft 0 in (1.83 m)	Fr	Lucijan Vranjanin	Zagreb, Croatia
G	22	Sierra Carson	5 ft 8 in (1.73 m)	Fr	Oxford Hills Comprehensive High School	Norway, ME
G	24	Leiya Stuart	5 ft 9 in (1.75 m)	Sr	Vermont	East Stroudsburg, PA

Head coach

- Linda Cimino (Adelphi)

Assistant coach(es)

- Robert Isme (NYIT)
- Kerri Reaves (Marquette)
- Anh-Dao Tran (Adelphi)

Legend

- (C) Team captain
- (S) Suspended
- (I) Ineligible
- (W) Walk-on
- Injured
- Current redshirt

Roster
Last update: February 13, 2024

== Schedule and results ==
Date time, TV	Rank^{#}	Opponent^{#}	Result	Record	Site (attendance) city, state
Non-conference regular season
November 6, 2023*; 5:00 p.m., ESPN+		at Bryant	L 52–70	0–1	Chace Athletic Center (562); Smithfield, RI
November 12, 2023*; 1:00 p.m., ESPN+		Siena	L 49–56	0–2	Leede Arena (453); Hanover, NH
November 14, 2023*; 7:00 p.m., ESPN+		Keene State	W 65–41	1–2	Leede Arena (363); Hanover, NH
November 26, 2023*; 1:00 p.m., ESPN+		at New Hampshire; Rivalry	W 43–40	2–2	Lundholm Gym (343); Durham, NH
November 30, 2023*; 6:00 p.m., ESPN+		at Vermont	L 32–58	2–3	Patrick Gym (601); Burlington, VT
December 4, 2023*; 2:00 p.m., ESPN+		UC Riverside	L 38–57	2–4	Leede Arena (305); Hanover, NH
December 8, 2023*; 5:00 p.m., ESPN+		Navy	W 65–52	3–4	Leede Arena (459); Hanover, NH
December 10, 2023*; 1:00 p.m., NESN+		at Merrimack	W 49–45	4–4	Lawler Arena (754); North Andover, MA
December 12, 2023*; 7:00 p.m., ESPN+		at Albany	L 57–68	4–5	Broadview Center (792); Albany, NY
December 14, 2023*; 6:00 p.m., ESPN+		at UMass Lowell	W 58–52	5–5	Costello Athletic Center (316); Lowell, MA
December 21, 2023*; 11:00 a.m., NESN/ESPN+		Lafayette	L 55–57	5–6	Leede Arena (951); Hanover, NH
Ivy League regular season
January 6, 2024; 1:00 p.m., ESPN+		Brown	L 39–65	5–7 (0–1)	Leede Arena (513); Hanover, NH
January 7, 2024*; 4:00 p.m., ESPN+		VTSU–Lyndon	W 77–35	6–7	Leede Arena (550); Hanover, NH
January 13, 2024; 1:00 p.m., ESPN+		Penn	L 39–53	6–8 (0–2)	Leede Arena (694); Hanover, NH
January 15, 2024; 6:00 p.m., ESPN+		Princeton	L 40–63	6–9 (0–3)	Leede Arena (505); Hanover, NH
January 20, 2024; 1:00 p.m., ESPN+		at Yale	L 46–48	6–10 (0–4)	John J. Lee Amphitheater (–); New Haven, CT
January 27, 2024; 3:00 p.m., ESPN+		at Brown	L 31–35	6–11 (0–5)	Pizzitola Sports Center (497); Providence, RI
February 2, 2024; 6:00 p.m., ESPN+		at Cornell	L 47–61	6–12 (0–6)	Newman Arena (273); Ithaca, NY
February 3, 2024; 5:00 p.m., ESPN+		at Columbia	L 52–71	6–13 (0–7)	Levien Gymnasium (1,707); New York, NY
February 10, 2024; 2:00 p.m., NESN/ESPN+		Harvard	L 50–68	6–14 (0–8)	Leede Arena (663); Hanover, NH
February 16, 2024; 6:00 p.m., ESPN+		Columbia	L 56–80	6–15 (0–9)	Leede Arena (594); Hanover, NH
February 17, 2024; 4:00 p.m., ESPN+		Cornell	W 48–44	7–15 (1–9)	Leede Arena (660); Hanover, NH
February 24, 2024; 1:00 p.m., ESPN+		Yale	L 42–78	7–16 (1–10)	Leede Arena (638); Hanover, NH
March 1, 2024; 5:00 p.m., ESPN+		at Penn	L 41–79	7–17 (1–11)	The Palestra (768); Philadelphia, PA
March 2, 2024; 4:00 p.m., ESPN+		at Princeton	L 42–68	7–18 (1–12)	Jadwin Gymnasium (1,510); Princeton, NJ
March 5, 2024; 8:00 p.m., ESPN+		at Harvard	L 48–75	7–19 (1–13)	Lavietes Pavilion (539); Cambridge, MA
*Non-conference game. ^{#}Rankings from AP poll. (#) Tournament seedings in parentheses. All times are in Eastern.
