= 2023–24 Harvard Crimson women's basketball team =

American college basketball season

2023–24 Harvard Crimson women's basketball
- Conference: Ivy League
- Record: 16–12 (9–5 Ivy)
- Head coach: Carrie Moore (2nd season)
- Assistant coaches: Ali Sanders; Steve Harney; Ariel Gaston
- Home arena: Lavietes Pavilion

2023–24 Ivy League women's basketball standings
| | Conf. | | | | Overall |
| Team | W | | L | PCT | W | | L | PCT |
|---|---|---|---|---|---|---|---|---|
| Princeton † | 13 | – | 1 | .929 | 25 | – | 5 | .833 |
| Columbia | 13 | – | 1 | .929 | 23 | – | 7 | .767 |
| Harvard | 9 | – | 5 | .643 | 16 | – | 12 | .571 |
| Penn | 7 | – | 7 | .500 | 15 | – | 13 | .536 |
| Brown | 7 | – | 7 | .500 | 16 | – | 11 | .593 |
| Yale | 5 | – | 9 | .357 | 8 | – | 19 | .296 |
| Cornell | 1 | – | 13 | .071 | 7 | – | 19 | .269 |
| Dartmouth | 1 | – | 13 | .071 | 7 | – | 19 | .269 |
† 2024 Ivy League tournament winner

The 2023–24 Harvard Crimson women's basketball team represented Harvard University during the 2023–24 NCAA Division I women's basketball season. The Crimson, led by second-year head coach Carrie Moore, played their home games at the Lavietes Pavilion in Cambridge, Massachusetts as members of the Ivy League.

== Previous season ==
The Crimson finished the 2022–23 season 20–12, 9–5 in Ivy League play, to finish in a tie for third place. In the Ivy League tournament, they defeated Columbia in the semifinals, before falling to top-seeded Princeton in the championship game. They received an at-large bid into the WNIT, where they defeated Towson in the first round, UMass in the second round, and Rhode Island in the Super 16, before falling to Ivy League foe Columbia in the Great 8.

== Roster ==
2023–24 Harvard Crimson women's basketball team
Players
Coaches

| Pos. | # | Name | Height | Year | Previous school | Hometown |
|---|---|---|---|---|---|---|
| G | 3 | Kennedy Heath | 5 ft 9 in (1.75 m) | Sr | Panther Creek High School | Cary, NC |
| F | 4 | Mona Zarić | 6 ft 2 in (1.88 m) | Jr | Kykkos B'Lyceum | Novi Sad, Serbia |
| G | 5 | Gabby Anderson | 5 ft 11 in (1.8 m) | So | IMG Academy | Columbus, OH |
| G | 10 | Elena Rodriguez | 6 ft 2 in (1.88 m) | Jr | IES Joaquin Artiles | Agüimes, Spain |
| G | 12 | Karlee White | 5 ft 9 in (1.75 m) | Fr | Oak Park High School | Burbank, CA |
| G | 14 | Harmoni Turner | 5 ft 10 in (1.78 m) | Jr | Mansfield Legacy High School | Mansfield, TX |
| G | 20 | Lola Mullaney | 5 ft 11 in (1.8 m) | Sr | Manasquan High School | Rumson, NJ |
| G | 22 | Saniyah Glenn-Bello | 6 ft 0 in (1.83 m) | So | Christ the King High School | Staten Island, NY |
| F | 24 | Mary Hollensteiner | 6 ft 1 in (1.85 m) | Fr | Stone Ridge School of the Sacred Heart | Bethesda, MD |
| F | 31 | Katie Krupa | 6 ft 1 in (1.85 m) | So | Morton High School | Morton, IL |
| G | 32 | Elle Stauffer | 5 ft 11 in (1.8 m) | Jr | Germantown Academy | Doylestown, PA |
| G/F | 40 | Abigail Wright | 6 ft 1 in (1.85 m) | Fr | Newton North High School | Newton, MA |

Head coach

- Carrie Moore (Western Michigan)

Assistant coach(es)

- Ali Sanders (Southeastern)
- Steve Harney (Dickinson)
- Ariel Gaston (New Hampshire)

Legend

- (C) Team captain
- (S) Suspended
- (I) Ineligible
- (W) Walk-on
- Injured
- Current redshirt

Roster
Last update: February 9, 2024

== Schedule and results ==
| Date time, TV | Rank^{#} | Opponent^{#} | Result | Record | High points | High rebounds | High assists | Site (attendance) city, state |
Non-conference regular season
| November 6, 2023*; 7:00 pm, B1G+ | | at No. 14 Maryland | L 75–98 | 0–1 | 18 – Turner | 7 – 3 tied | 6 – Turner | Xfinity Center (4,891); College Park, MD |
| November 9, 2023*; 6:00 pm, ACCN | | at Boston College | W 66–59 | 1–1 | 26 – Turner | 8 – Rodriguez | 3 – Rodriguez | Conte Forum (617); Chestnut Hill, MA |
| November 12, 2023*; 2:00 pm, ESPN+ | | Quinnipiac | W 85–41 | 2–1 | 14 – 2 tied | 11 – Mullaney | 10 – Turner | Lavietes Pavilion (892); Cambridge, MA |
| November 16, 2023*; 6:00 pm, ESPN+ | | at UMass | W 78–57 | 3–1 | 23 – Mullaney | 10 – Glenn-Bello | 5 – Rodriguez | Mullins Center (984); Amherst, MA |
| November 19, 2023*; 1:00 pm, ESPN+ | | at No. 21 Baylor | L 71–81 | 3–2 | 29 – Turner | 11 – Rodriguez | 5 – Turner | Ferrell Center (3,812); Waco, TX |
| November 24, 2023*; 5:30 pm, FloHoops | | vs. North Dakota State; San Diego Classic | W 69–64 | 4–2 | 22 – Turner | 6 – Rodriguez | 4 – Rodriguez | Harry West Gymnasium; San Diego, CA |
| November 25, 2023*; 5:30 pm, FloHoops | | vs. SMU; San Diego Classic | W 80–67 | 5–2 | 25 – Turner | 9 – Rodriguez | 7 – Turner | Harry West Gymnasium (255); San Diego, CA |
| December 2, 2023*; 2:00 pm, ESPN+ | | Michigan | L 66–80 | 5–3 | 25 – Mullaney | 6 – Rodriguez | 4 – Rodriguez | Lavietes Pavilion (1,636); Cambridge, MA |
| December 6, 2023*; 6:00 pm, ESPN+ | | at Maine | L 61–79 | 5–4 | 17 – Mullaney | 7 – White | 5 – 2 tied | Memorial Gymnasium (907); Orono, ME |
| December 9, 2023*; 7:00 pm, NESN/ESPN+ | | at Boston University | L 77–80 | 5–5 | 21 – Mullaney | 8 – 2 tied | 4 – 2 tied | Case Gym (893); Boston, MA |
| December 22, 2023*; 1:00 pm, ESPN+ | | at UMass Lowell | W 62–41 | 6–5 | 13 – Rodriguez | 9 – Rodriguez | 4 – Rodriguez | Costello Athletic Center (348); Lowell, MA |
| December 28, 2023*; 6:00 pm, ESPN+ | | at Rhode Island | L 56–59 | 6–6 | 15 – Mullaney | 8 – Rodriguez | 6 – Rodriguez | Ryan Center (1,416); Kingston, RI |
| December 31, 2023*; 2:00 pm, FloHoops | | at Delaware | W 88–58 | 7–6 | 33 – Rodriguez | 11 – Rodriguez | 6 – Mullaney | Bob Carpenter Center (1,174); Newark, DE |
Ivy League regular season
| January 6, 2024; 1:00 pm, NESN | | Yale | W 73–54 | 8–6 (1–0) | 28 – Turner | 5 – 2 tied | 4 – White | Lavietes Pavilion (703); Cambridge, MA |
| January 13, 2024; 2:00 pm, ESPN+ | | Princeton | L 49–72 | 8–7 (1–1) | 16 – Mullaney | 9 – Rodriguez | 4 – Rodriguez | Lavietes Pavilion (1,636); Cambridge, MA |
| January 15, 2024; 3:00 pm, ESPN+ | | at Brown | W 73–59 | 9–7 (2–1) | 21 – Rodriguez | 13 – Rodriguez | 5 – 2 tied | Pizzitola Sports Center (627); Providence, RI |
| January 20, 2024; 2:00 pm, ESPN+ | | Penn | W 69–56 | 10–7 (3–1) | 31 – Turner | 10 – Turner | 6 – Turner | Lavietes Pavilion (815); Cambridge, MA |
| January 27, 2024; 1:00 pm, ESPN+ | | at Yale | W 61–52 | 11–7 (4–1) | 24 – Turner | 13 – Rodriguez | 5 – Rodriguez | John J. Lee Amphitheater (517); New Haven, CT |
| February 2, 2024; 6:00 pm, ESPN+ | | at Columbia | L 70–82 | 11–8 (4–2) | 23 – Krupa | 5 – Glenn-Bello | 5 – Turner | Levien Gymnasium (2,123); New York, NY |
| February 3, 2024; 5:00 pm, ESPN+ | | at Cornell | W 63–52 | 12–8 (5–2) | 24 – Krupa | 10 – Krupa | 4 – Glenn-Bello | Newman Arena (583); Ithaca, NY |
| February 10, 2024; 2:00 pm, ESPN+ | | at Dartmouth | W 68–50 | 13–8 (6–2) | 16 – Mullaney | 8 – Anderson | 4 – 2 tied | Leede Arena (663); Hanover, NH |
| February 16, 2024; 6:00 pm, ESPN+ | | Cornell | W 74–51 | 14–8 (7–2) | 19 – Turner | 12 – Turner | 5 – Turner | Lavietes Pavilion (762); Cambridge, MA |
| February 18, 2024; 2:00 pm, ESPNU | | Columbia | L 63–71 | 14–9 (7–3) | 25 – Krupa | 6 – Anderson | 4 – 2 tied | Lavietes Pavilion (1,636); Cambridge, MA |
| February 24, 2024; 2:00 pm, ESPN+ | | Brown | W 80–73 | 15–9 (8–3) | 24 – Mullaney | 8 – 2 tied | 10 – Turner | Lavietes Pavilion (872); Cambridge, MA |
| March 1, 2024; 5:00 pm, ESPN+ | | at Princeton | L 49–60 | 15–10 (8–4) | 20 – Turner | 8 – Turner | 3 – 2 tied | Jadwin Gymnasium (1,505); Princeton, NJ |
| March 2, 2024; 7:00 pm, ESPN+ | | at Penn | L 67–69 | 15–11 (8–5) | 19 – Turner | 6 – Rodriguez | 5 – Krupa | The Palestra (1,093); Philadelphia, PA |
| March 9, 2024; 2:00 pm, ESPN+ | | Dartmouth | W 75–48 | 16–11 (9–5) | 24 – Turner | 13 – Turner | 4 – 2 tied | Lavietes Pavilion (539); Cambridge, MA |
Ivy League tournament
| March 15, 2024; 7:00 pm, ESPN+ | (3) | (2) Columbia; Semifinals | L 61–63 | 16–12 | 21 – Turner | 9 – Rodriguez | 4 – Turner | Levien Gymnasium (2,598); New York, NY |
*Non-conference game. ^{#}Rankings from AP poll. (#) Tournament seedings in parentheses. All times are in Eastern.
