= 2023–24 Princeton Tigers women's basketball team =

Intercollegiate basketball season

2023–24 Princeton Tigers women's basketball

Ivy League regular-season co-champions Ivy League tournament champions

NCAA tournament, first round
- Conference: Ivy League

Ranking
- Coaches: No. 24
- Record: 25–5 (13–1 Ivy)
- Head coach: Carla Berube (5th season)
- Assistant coaches: Lauren Battista (5th season); Lauren Dillon (5th season); Tiana-Jo Carter (2nd season)
- Home arena: Jadwin Gymnasium

2023–24 Ivy League women's basketball standings
	Conf.				Overall
Team	W		L	PCT	W		L	PCT
Princeton †	13	–	1	.929	25	–	5	.833
Columbia	13	–	1	.929	23	–	7	.767
Harvard	9	–	5	.643	16	–	12	.571
Penn	7	–	7	.500	15	–	13	.536
Brown	7	–	7	.500	16	–	11	.593
Yale	5	–	9	.357	8	–	19	.296
Cornell	1	–	13	.071	7	–	19	.269
Dartmouth	1	–	13	.071	7	–	19	.269
† 2024 Ivy League tournament winner

The 2023–24 Princeton Tigers women's basketball team represented Princeton University during the 2023–24 NCAA Division I women's basketball season. The Tigers, led by fifth-year head coach Carla Berube, played their home games at Jadwin Gymnasium in Princeton, New Jersey as members of the Ivy League.

The Tigers finished the season with a 25–5 overall record, 13–1 in Ivy League play, to finish in a tie for first place with Columbia as the conference's regular-season co-champion. As the top seed in the Ivy League tournament, they beat Penn and Columbia to win the championship. They received an automatic bid to the NCAA tournament, where they were the ninth seed in the Albany Regional 2. They lost in the first round to West Virginia.

== Previous season ==
The Tigers finished the season with a 24–6 overall record, 12–2 in Ivy League play, to finish in first place with Columbia and was the conference's regular-season co-champion. As the top seed in the Ivy League tournament, they beat Penn and Harvard to win the championship. They received an automatic bid to the NCAA tournament, where they were the tenth seed in the Greenville Regional 2. They defeated NC State in the first round before losing to Utah to end their season.

== Offseason ==
=== Departures ===
Departures
Name	Number	Pos.	Height	Year	Hometown	Reason for departure
Maggie Connolly	12	G	5' 8"	Senior	Wilmington, DE	Graduated
Julia Cunningham	24	G	5' 11"	Senior	Watchung, NJ	Graduated
Kira Emsbo	21	F	6' 5"	Senior	Lakewood, CO	Graduated
Grace Stone	10	G	6' 5"	Senior	Glen Cove, NY	Graduated
Lexi Weger	33	G/F	6' 3"	Senior	South Hadley, MA	Graduated

== Roster ==
2023–24 Princeton Tigers women's basketball team
Players
Coaches

Pos.	#	Name	Height	Year	Hometown
F	00	Ellie Mitchell	6 ft 1 in (1.85 m)	Sr	Chevy Chase, MD
G	1	Adaora Nwokeji	5 ft 8 in (1.73 m)	Jr	Houston, TX
G/F	2	Olivia Hutcherson	5 ft 11 in (1.8 m)	Fr	Johns Creek, GA
F	3	Tabitha Amanze	6 ft 4 in (1.93 m)	So	Ogun, Nigeria
F	5	Paige Morton	6 ft 3 in (1.91 m)	Jr	Summit, NJ
G	10	Skye Belker	5 ft 9 in (1.75 m)	Fr	Los Angeles, CA
F	11	Taylor Charles	6 ft 2 in (1.88 m)	So	Elgin, IL
G	13	Ashley Chea	5 ft 8 in (1.73 m)	Fr	Montebello, CA
G/F	15	Fadima Tall	6 ft 0 in (1.83 m)	Fr	Silver Spring, MD
G	20	Kaitlyn Chen	5 ft 9 in (1.75 m)	Sr	San Marino, CA
G	21	Margo Mattes	5 ft 10 in (1.78 m)	Fr	Brookline, MA
F	22	Parker Hill	6 ft 4 in (1.93 m)	Jr	Bethesda, MD
G	23	Madison St. Rose	5 ft 10 in (1.78 m)	So	Old Bridge, NJ
G	24	Mari Bickley	5 ft 10 in (1.78 m)	Fr	Akron, OH
G	25	Chet Nweke	6 ft 0 in (1.83 m)	Sr	Woodbine, MD
G	32	Amelia Osgood	5 ft 9 in (1.75 m)	Jr	Brentwood, TN
F	44	Katie Thiers	6 ft 2 in (1.88 m)	Jr	Seattle, WA

Head coach

- Carla Berube (Connecticut)

Assistant coach(es)

- Lauren Battista (Bentley)
- Lauren Dillon (Tufts)
- Tiana-Jo Carter (Albany)

Legend

- (C) Team captain
- (S) Suspended
- (I) Ineligible
- (W) Walk-on
- Injured
- Current redshirt

Roster
Last update: February 2, 2024

== Schedule ==
Date time, TV	Rank^{#}	Opponent^{#}	Result	Record	Site (attendance) city, state
Non-conference regular season
November 6, 2023*; 7:00 p.m., ESPN+		Duquesne	W 65–57	1–0	Jadwin Gymnasium (750); Princeton, NJ
November 12, 2023*; 2:00 p.m., ESPN+		at Middle Tennessee	W 65–60	2–0	Murphy Center (3,015); Murfreesboro, TN
November 17, 2023*; 2:30 p.m., P12N		at No. 3 UCLA	L 74–77	2–1	Pauley Pavilion (6,243); Los Angeles, CA
November 19, 2023*; 5:00 p.m., ESPN+		at San Diego	W 62–51	3–1	Jenny Craig Pavilion (1,059); San Diego, CA
November 23, 2023*; 3:00 p.m.		vs. No. 22 Oklahoma; Elevance Health Fort Myers Women's Tip-Off	W 77–63	4–1	Suncoast Credit Union Arena (512); Fort Myers, FL
November 25, 2023*; 11:00 a.m.		vs. No. 21 Indiana; Elevance Health Fort Myers Women's Tip-Off	L 63–72	4–2	Suncoast Credit Union Arena (511); Fort Myers, FL
November 29, 2023*; 7:00 p.m., ESPN+	No. 25	Seton Hall	W 75–71 ^{2OT}	5–2	Jadwin Gymnasium (933); Princeton, NJ
December 3, 2023*; 1:00 p.m., ESPN+	No. 25	at Rhode Island	L 58–60	5–3	Ryan Center (1,149); Kingston, RI
December 6, 2023*; 7:00 p.m., NBCSPHI		Quinnipiac	W 79–70	6–3	Jadwin Gymnasium (640); Princeton, NJ
December 11, 2023*; 7:00 p.m., FloSports		at Villanova	W 61–58	7–3	Finneran Pavilion (1,119); Villanova, PA
December 13, 2023*; 7:00 p.m., NBCSPHI/SNY		Rutgers; Rivalry	W 66–55	8–3	Jadwin Gymnasium (1,307); Princeton, NJ
December 29, 2023*; 1:00 p.m., ESPN+		at Vermont	W 67–47	9–3	Patrick Gym (1,229); Burlington, VT
December 31, 2023*; 12:00 p.m.		at Le Moyne	W 66–55	10–3	Ted Grant Court (166); Syracuse, NY
Ivy League regular season
January 6, 2024; 2:00 p.m., ESPN+		at Cornell	W 79–38	11–3 (1–0)	Newman Arena; Ithaca, NY
January 13, 2024; 2:00 p.m., ESPN+		at Harvard	W 72–49	12–3 (2–0)	Lavietes Pavilion (1,636); Cambridge, MA
January 15, 2024; 6:00 p.m., ESPN+		at Dartmouth	W 63–40	13–3 (3–0)	Leede Arena (505); Hanover, NH
January 20, 2024; 4:00 p.m., ESPNews		Columbia	W 80–65	14–3 (4–0)	Jadwin Gymnasium (1,873); Princeton, NJ
January 27, 2024; 2:00 p.m., ESPN+		Cornell	W 85–47	15–3 (5–0)	Jadwin Gymnasium (1,104); Princeton, NJ
February 2, 2024; 7:00 p.m., NBCSPHI/SNY	No. 25	Yale	W 79–59	16–3 (6–0)	Jadwin Gymnasium (1,074); Princeton, NJ
February 3, 2024; 5:00 p.m., ESPN+	No. 25	Brown	W 76–63	17–3 (7–0)	Jadwin Gymnasium (2,710); Princeton, NJ
February 10, 2024; 2:00 p.m., ESPN+	No. 25	at Penn	W 67–54	18–3 (8–0)	Palestra (1,086); Philadelphia, PA
February 16, 2024; 7:00 p.m., ESPN+	No. 25	at Brown	W 74–62	19–3 (9–0)	Pizzitola Sports Center (307); Providence, RI
February 17, 2024; 6:00 p.m., ESPN+	No. 25	at Yale	W 70–25	20–3 (10–0)	John J. Lee Amphitheater (545); New Haven, CT
February 24, 2024; 2:00 p.m., ESPN+	No. 25	at Columbia	L 65–67	20–4 (10–1)	Levien Gymnasium (2,698); New York, NY
March 1, 2024; 5:00 p.m., ESPN+		Harvard	W 60–49	21–4 (11–1)	Jadwin Gymnasium (1,505); Princeton, NJ
March 2, 2024; 4:00 p.m., ESPN+		Dartmouth	W 68–42	22–4 (12–1)	Jadwin Gymnasium (1,510); Princeton, NJ
March 9, 2024; 2:00 p.m., ESPN+		Penn	W 72–55	23–4 (13–1)	Jadwin Gymnasium (1,684); Princeton, NJ
Ivy League tournament
March 15, 2024; 4:30 p.m., ESPN+	(1)	vs. (4) Penn; Semifinals	W 59–54	24–4	Levien Gymnasium (1,552); New York, NY
March 15, 2024; 4:30 p.m., ESPNews	(1)	at (2) Columbia; Championship	W 75–58	25–4	Levien Gymnasium (2,703); New York, NY
NCAA tournament
March 23, 2024*; 5:30 p.m., ESPN2	(9 A2)	vs. (8 A2) West Virginia; First round	L 53–63	25–5	Carver–Hawkeye Arena (14,324); Iowa City, IA
*Non-conference game. ^{#}Rankings from AP poll. (#) Tournament seedings in parentheses. A2=Albany. All times are in Eastern Time.

== Rankings ==
Ranking movements Legend: ██ Increase in ranking ██ Decrease in ranking — = Not ranked RV = Received votes
	Week																				
Poll	Pre	1	2	3	4	5	6	7	8	9	10	11	12	13	14	15	16	17	18	19	Final
AP	—	—	RV	25	—	—	—	—	—	RV	RV	RV	25	25	25	25	RV	RV	RV	RV	Not released
Coaches	RV	RV	RV	RV	RV	RV	RV	RV	RV	RV	RV	RV	25	24	24	23	RV	25	24	24	

Legend
	Increase in ranking
	Decrease in ranking
	Not ranked previous week
(RV)	Received votes
(NR)	Not ranked and did not receive votes
