= 2023–24 Columbia Lions women's basketball team =

Intercollegiate basketball season

2023–24 Columbia Lions women's basketball

Ivy League regular-season co–champions

NCAA tournament, First Four
- Conference: Ivy League
- Record: 23–7 (13–1 Ivy)
- Head coach: Megan Griffith (8th season)
- Assistant coaches: Tyler Cordell; Allie Bassetti; Cy Lippold
- Home arena: Levien Gymnasium

2023–24 Ivy League women's basketball standings
	Conf.				Overall
Team	W		L	PCT	W		L	PCT
Princeton †	13	–	1	.929	25	–	5	.833
Columbia	13	–	1	.929	23	–	7	.767
Harvard	9	–	5	.643	16	–	12	.571
Penn	7	–	7	.500	15	–	13	.536
Brown	7	–	7	.500	16	–	11	.593
Yale	5	–	9	.357	8	–	19	.296
Cornell	1	–	13	.071	7	–	19	.269
Dartmouth	1	–	13	.071	7	–	19	.269
† 2024 Ivy League tournament winner

The 2023–24 Columbia Lions women's basketball team represented Columbia University during the 2023–24 NCAA Division I women's basketball season. The Lions, led by eighth-year head coach Megan Griffith, played their home games at Levien Gymnasium in New York City as members of the Ivy League.

== Previous season ==
They finished the previous season 28–6, 12–2 in Ivy League play, winning a share of the Ivy League title for the first time in program history. They lost to Harvard in the 2023 Ivy League women's basketball tournament semifinals. After being the first team left out of the NCAA tournament field, the Lions accepted an auto-bid to the 2023 WNIT. The team fell to Kansas in the championship game.

== Roster ==
2023–24 Columbia Lions women's basketball team
Players
Coaches

Pos.	#	Name	Height	Year	Previous school	Hometown
F	0	Susie Rafiu	6 ft 1 in (1.85 m)	So	Copleston	Ipswich, England
G/F	1	Perri Page	5 ft 11 in (1.8 m)	So	Chartiers Valley	Pittsburgh, PA
G	2	Ava Sciolla	6 ft 0 in (1.83 m)	So	Pennsbury; Maryland	Fairless Hills, PA
G	3	Cecelia Collins	6 ft 0 in (1.83 m)	Jr	Scranton Prep; Bucknell	Scranton, PA
G/F	4	Fliss Henderson	5 ft 11 in (1.8 m)	Fr	St Luke's Grammar School	North Curl Curl, Australia
G	10	Kitty Henderson (C)	5 ft 10 in (1.78 m)	Jr	St Luke's Grammar School	North Curl Curl, Australia
F	11	Mary Lobon	6 ft 1 in (1.85 m)	Sr	Caxton College	Valencia, Spain
G	21	Nicole Stephens	5 ft 7 in (1.7 m)	Sr	Pickerington Central	Pickerington, OH
G	22	Habti Calvo	5 ft 9 in (1.75 m)	Fr	Humanitas Bilingual School	Madrid, Spain
G	24	Riley Weiss	5 ft 10 in (1.78 m)	Fr	GW Hewlett (N.Y.); North Broward Prep (Fla.)	Hewlett, NY
G	30	Emily Montes	5 ft 10 in (1.78 m)	Fr	Palmer Trinity	Miami, FL
F/C	33	Noa Comesaña	6 ft 1 in (1.85 m)	Jr	IES de Beade	Vigo, Spain
G/F	34	Paige Lauder	6 ft 1 in (1.85 m)	Sr	Villa Maria Academy	Malvern, PA
G	35	Abbey Hsu (C)	5 ft 11 in (1.8 m)	Sr	Marjory Stoneman Douglas High School; St. Thomas Aquinas High School	Parkland, FL
G/F	42	Blau Tor	6 ft 0 in (1.83 m)	Fr	INS Joaquim Blume	Barcelona, Spain

Head coach

- Megan Griffith (Columbia)

Assistant coach(es)

- Tyler Cordell (Ohio Wesleyan)
- Allie Bassetti (Rowan)
- Cy Lippold (Dartmouth)

Legend

- (C) Team captain
- (S) Suspended
- (I) Ineligible
- (W) Walk-on
- Injured
- Current redshirt

Roster
Last update: November 15, 2023

== Schedule ==
Date time, TV	Rank^{#}	Opponent^{#}	Result	Record	Site (attendance) city, state
Non-conference regular season
November 6, 2023*; 6:30 p.m., FloHoops		at Stony Brook	L 73–85	0–1	Island Federal Credit Union Arena (905); Stony Brook, NY
November 10, 2023*; 7:00 p.m., ESPN+		Seton Hall	W 72–61	1–1	Levien Gymnasium (1,011); New York, NY
November 14, 2023*; 6:00 p.m., ESPN+		Duke	L 62–66	1–2	Levien Gymnasium (2,027); New York, NY
November 16, 2023*; 7:00 p.m., ESPN+		Towson	W 80–57	2–2	Levien Gymnasium (524); New York, NY
November 20, 2023*; 11:00 a.m., FloHoops		vs. Georgia; Baha Mar Pink Flamingo Championship	L 56–73	2–3	Baha Mar Convention Center (239); Nassau, Bahamas
November 22, 2023*; 1:30 p.m., FloHoops		vs. Florida; Baha Mar Hoops Pink Flamingo Championship	L 81–83	2–4	Baha Mar Convention Center; Nassau, Bahamas
November 25, 2023*; 4:00 p.m., ESPN+		Northeastern	W 88–45	3–4	Levien Gymnasium (896); New York, NY
November 29, 2023*; 11:00 a.m., SNY/ESPN+		Providence	W 77–52	4–4	Levien Gymnasium (2,357); New York, NY
December 3, 2023*; 2:00 p.m., ESPN+		Villanova	W 77–75	5–4	Levien Gymnasium (1,024); New York, NY
December 6, 2023*; 7:00 p.m., ESPN+		Memphis	W 76–66	6–4	Levien Gymnasium (907); New York, NY
December 10, 2023*; 2:00 p.m., ESPN+		Wagner	W 79–50	7–4	Levien Gymnasium (924); New York, NY
December 28, 2023*; 9:00 p.m., ESPN+		at San Francisco	W 74–67	8–4	War Memorial Gymnasium (348); San Francisco, CA
December 31, 2023*; 5:00 p.m., ESPN+		at Pacific	W 93–75	9–4	Alex G. Spanos Center (380); Stockton, CA
Ivy League regular season
January 6, 2024; 2:00 p.m., ESPN+		Penn	W 79–66	10–4 (1–0)	Levien Gymnasium (1,202); New York, NY
January 13, 2024; 2:00 p.m., ESPN+		Cornell	W 82–53	11–4 (2–0)	Levien Gymnasium (1,098); New York, NY
January 15, 2024; 2:00 p.m., SNY/ESPN+		Yale; MLK Day	W 88–52	12–4 (3–0)	Levien Gymnasium (1,397); New York, NY
January 20, 2024; 4:00 p.m., ESPN+		at Princeton	L 65–80	12–5 (3–1)	Jadwin Gymnasium (1,873); Princeton, NJ
January 27, 2024; 2:00 p.m., ESPN+		at Penn	W 85–55	13–5 (4–1)	The Palestra (748); Philadelphia, PA
February 2, 2024; 6:00 p.m., ESPN+		Harvard	W 82–70	14–5 (5–1)	Levien Gymnasium (2,123); New York, NY
February 3, 2024; 5:00 p.m., ESPN+		Dartmouth	W 71–52	15–5 (6–1)	Levien Gymnasium (1,707); New York, NY
February 9, 2024; 7:00 p.m., ESPN+		Brown	W 90–73	16–5 (7–1)	Levien Gymnasium (1,245); New York, NY
February 16, 2024; 6:00 p.m., ESPN+		at Dartmouth	W 80–56	17–5 (8–1)	Leede Arena (594); Hanover, NH
February 18, 2024; 2:00 p.m., ESPNU		at Harvard	W 71–63	18–5 (9–1)	Lavietes Pavilion (1,636); Cambridge, MA
February 24, 2024; 2:00 p.m., ESPN+		No. 25 Princeton	W 67–65	19–5 (10–1)	Levien Gymnasium (2,698); New York, NY
March 1, 2024; 4:00 p.m., ESPN+		at Brown	W 77–62	20–5 (11–1)	Pizzitola Sports Center (277); Providence, RI
March 2, 2024; 3:00 p.m., ESPN+		at Yale	W 76–50	21–5 (12–1)	John J. Lee Amphitheater; New Haven, CT
March 9, 2024; 2:00 p.m., ESPN+		at Cornell	W 82–46	22–5 (13–1)	Newman Arena (538); Ithaca, NY
Ivy League tournament
March 15, 2024; 7:00 p.m., ESPN+	(2)	(3) Harvard; Semifinals	W 63–61	23–5	Levien Gymnasium (2,598); New York, NY
March 16, 2024; 5:00 p.m., ESPNews	(2)	(1) Princeton; Finals	L 58–75	23–6	Levien Gymnasium (2,703); New York, NY
NCAA women's tournament
March 20, 2024*; 9:00 p.m., ESPNU	(12 P3)	vs. (12 P3) Vanderbilt; First Four	L 68–72	23–7	Cassell Coliseum (599); Blacksburg, VA
*Non-conference game. ^{#}Rankings from AP poll. (#) Tournament seedings in parentheses. P3=Portland 3. All times are in Eastern.

== See also ==
- 2023–24 Columbia Lions men's basketball team
