= 2023–24 Providence Friars women's basketball team =

Intercollegiate basketball season

2023–24 Providence Friars women's basketball
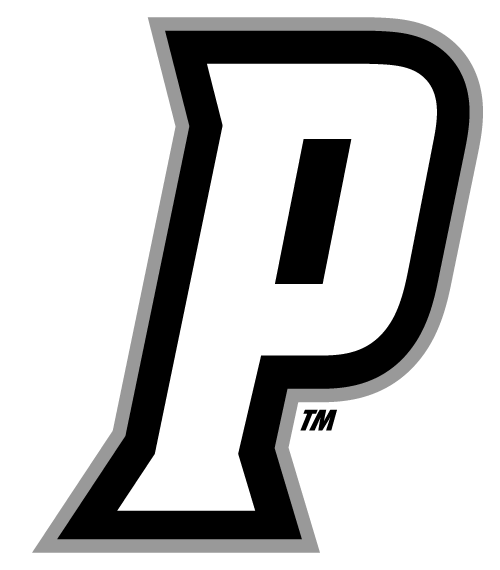

WNIT, Second Round
- Conference: Big East Conference
- Record: 13–21 (6–12 Big East)
- Head coach: Erin Batth (1st season)
- Assistant coaches: Valerie Nainima; Kaili McLaren; Reyna Frost
- Home arena: Alumni Hall

2023–24 Big East women's basketball standings
	Conf.				Overall
Team	W		L	PCT	W		L	PCT
No. 3 UConn †	18	–	0	1.000	33	–	6	.846
No. 23 Creighton	15	–	3	.833	26	–	6	.813
St. John's	11	–	7	.611	18	–	15	.545
Villanova	11	–	7	.611	22	–	13	.629
Marquette	11	–	7	.611	23	–	9	.719
Georgetown	9	–	9	.500	23	–	12	.657
Seton Hall	8	–	10	.444	17	–	15	.531
Butler	6	–	12	.333	15	–	17	.469
Providence	6	–	12	.333	13	–	21	.382
DePaul	4	–	14	.222	12	–	20	.375
Xavier	0	–	18	.000	1	–	27	.036
† 2024 Big East tournament winner Rankings from AP poll

The 2023–24 Providence Friars women's basketball team represented Providence College in the 2023–24 NCAA Division I women's basketball season. The Friars were led by head coach Erin Batth in her first season at Providence and played their home games at Alumni Hall.

== Previous season ==
The Friars finished the 2022–23 season 13–19, 4–16 in Big East play to finish in tenth place. As the #10 seed in the Big East tournament, they were defeated by #7 seed DePaul in the first round.

On March 7, 2023, the school announced that they mutually parted ways with head coach Jim Crowley, after seven years as head coach. On March 20, Michigan assistant coach Erin Batth was named the team's next head coach.

== Roster ==
2023–24 Providence Friars women's basketball team
Players
Coaches

Pos.	#	Name	Height	Year	Previous school	Hometown
G	1	Kylee Sheppard	5 ft 9 in (1.75 m)	Jr	Roger Bacon	Cincinnati, OH
G	2	Grace Efosa	5 ft 11 in (1.8 m)	Sr	Whittier Tech	Lawrence, MA
G	3	Sahana Kanagasabay	5 ft 11 in (1.8 m)	Fr	Fleetwood Park Secondary School	Surrey, British Columbia, Canada
G	5	Sophi Hall	6 ft 1 in (1.85 m)	Fr	Holy Family HS	Carver, MN
F	10	Ugne Sirtautaite	6 ft 1 in (1.85 m)	Fr	-	Kaunas, Lithuania
G	11	Nariah Scott	5 ft 10 in (1.78 m)	Jr	Tabor	Holden, MA
G	12	Bella McLaughlin	5 ft 6 in (1.68 m)	Fr	Hampden Academy	Hampden, ME
G/F	13	Marta Morales Romero	6 ft 1 in (1.85 m)	Jr	Segle XXI/Wake Forest	Granada, Spain
G	22	Brynn Farrell	6 ft 0 in (1.83 m)	Sr	St. Rose HS/Florida	Ortley Beach, NJ
F	23	Sarah Bandoma	6 ft 3 in (1.91 m)	Jr	Johnston Senior HS/St. Francis Brooklyn	Johnston, RI
G	24	Audrey Koch	5 ft 10 in (1.78 m)	Jr	Iowa City West	Iowa City, IA
G	30	Kammie Ludwig	5 ft 10 in (1.78 m)	So	Geneseo HS	Geneseo, IL
F	31	Olivia Olsen	6 ft 3 in (1.91 m)	Jr	Niskayuna	Niskayuna, NY
G	32	Kendall Eddy	5 ft 7 in (1.7 m)	Fr	Brooks School	Haverhill, MS
F	33	Emily Archibald	6 ft 0 in (1.83 m)	Jr	Kennebunk	Kennebunk, MA
G	99	Laryn Edwards	5 ft 6 in (1.68 m)	GS	Hampton HS/Loyola (MD)	Allison Park, PA

Head coach

- Erin Batth (Clemson)

Assistant coach(es)

- Valerie Nainima (South Carolina)
- Kaili McLaren (Connecticut)
- Reyna Frost (Central Michigan)

Legend

- (C) Team captain
- (S) Suspended
- (I) Ineligible
- (W) Walk-on
- Injured
- Current redshirt

Roster
Last update: December 23, 2023

== Schedule ==
Date time, TV	Rank^{#}	Opponent^{#}	Result	Record	Site (attendance) city, state
Exhibition
November 1, 2023*; 7:00 p.m.		New Haven	W 75–55		Alumni Hall; Providence, RI
Non-conference regular season
November 7, 2023*; 7:00 p.m., FloHoops		Hampton	W 76–46	1–0	Alumni Hall (812); Providence, RI
November 10, 2023*; 7:00 p.m., FloHoops		Vermont	W 57–47	2–0	Alumni Hall (777); Providence, RI
November 15, 2023*; 7:00 p.m., ESPN+		at Brown	L 55–61	2–1	Pizzitola Sports Center (214); Providence, RI
November 19, 2023*; 2:00 p.m., FloSports		Boston College	L 56–71	2–2	Alumni Hall (847); Providence, RI
November 22, 2023*; 2:00 p.m., FloSports		Monmouth	W 57–40	3–2	Alumni Hall (515); Providence, RI
November 26, 2023*; 1:00 p.m., BTN+		at Penn State	L 66–73	3–3	Bryce Jordan Center (2,206); State College, PA
November 29, 2023*; 11:00 a.m., ESPN+		at Columbia	L 52–77	3–4	Levien Gymnasium (2,357); New York, NY
December 2, 2023*; 2:00 p.m., FloSports		Iona	L 49–61	3–5	Alumni Hall (528); Providence, RI
December 6, 2023*; 7:00 p.m., FloSports		Rhode Island	W 51–50	4–5	Alumni Hall (790); Providence, RI
December 9, 2023*; 12:00 p.m., ESPN+		at Yale	W 63–58	5–5	John J. Lee Amphitheater (411); New Haven, CT
December 16, 2023*; 5:00 p.m., FloSports		Sacred Heart	W 66–35	6–5	Alumni Hall (584); Providence, RI
December 20, 2023*; 3:30 p.m., FloSports		vs. Baylor; West Palm Beach Classic	L 36–61	6–6	Massimino Court (313); West Palm Beach, FL
December 21, 2023*; 1:15 p.m., FloSports		vs. Kennesaw State; West Palm Beach Classic	L 51–53	6–7	Massimino Court (48); West Palm Beach, FL
Big East regular season
December 30, 2023; 2:00 p.m., FloSports		at Seton Hall	W 51–46	7–7 (1–0)	Walsh Gymnasium (748); South Orange, NJ
January 3, 2024; 11:00 a.m., FloSports		DePaul	W 72–65	8–7 (2–0)	Alumni Hall (1,263); Providence, RI
January 6, 2024; 6:00 p.m., FS1		St. John's	L 48–55	8–8 (2–1)	Alumni Hall (958); Providence, RI
January 10, 2024; 6:30 p.m., SNY		at No. 13 UConn	L 41–85	8–9 (2–2)	Harry A. Gampel Pavilion (10,210); Storrs, CT
January 14, 2024; 2:00 p.m., FloSports		at No. 22 Creighton	L 70–81	8–10 (2–3)	D. J. Sokol Arena (1,620); Omaha, NE
January 17, 2024; 7:00 p.m., FloSports		Georgetown	L 71–73	8–11 (2–4)	Alumni Hall (644); Providence, RI
January 21, 2024; 12:00 p.m., FS1		at Butler	W 63–53	9–11 (3–4)	Hinkle Fieldhouse (1,456); Indianapolis, IN
January 24, 2024; 7:00 p.m., FloSports		Villanova	W 82–76 ^{OT}	10–11 (4–4)	Alumni Hall (827); Providence, RI
January 27, 2024; 2:00 p.m., FloSports		at Xavier	W 69–60	11–11 (5–4)	Cintas Center (943); Cincinnati, OH
February 3, 2024; 12:00 p.m., FloSports		Marquette	L 62–66	11–12 (5–5)	Alumni Hall (1,344); Providence, RI
February 7, 2024; 8:00 p.m., FloSports		at DePaul	L 72–84	11–13 (5–6)	Wintrust Arena (1,125); Chicago, IL
February 10, 2024; 7:00 p.m., FloSports		at Georgetown	L 44–54	11–14 (5–7)	McDonough Gymnasium (621); Washington, D.C.
February 14, 2024; 7:00 p.m., FloSports		Butler	L 48–55	11–15 (5–8)	Alumni Hall (507); Providence, RI
February 18, 2024; 2:00 p.m., FloSports		Xavier	W 66–42	12–15 (6–8)	Alumni Hall (1,063); Providence, RI
February 21, 2024; 7:00 p.m., FloSports		at Villanova	L 58–68	12–16 (6–9)	Finneran Pavilion (1,109); Villanova, PA
February 24, 2024; 2:00 p.m., FloSports		at St. John's	L 42–60	12–17 (6–10)	Carnesecca Arena (410); Queens, NY
February 28, 2024; 7:00 p.m., FloSports		Seton Hall	L 65–71	12–18 (6–11)	Alumni Hall (579); Providence, RI
March 2, 2024; 7:00 p.m., SNY		No. 10 UConn	L 42–65	12–19 (6–12)	Alumni Hall (1,246); Providence, RI
Big East Tournament
March 8, 2024; 11:00 a.m., FloSports	(9)	vs. (8) Butler; First Round	W 75–60	13–19	Mohegan Sun Arena; Uncasville, CT
March 9, 2024; 12:00 p.m., FS1	(9)	vs. (1) No. 9 UConn; Quarterfinals	L 53–86	13–20	Mohegan Sun Arena; Uncasville, CT
WNIT
March 25, 2024*; 7:00 p.m., FloSports		Colgate; Second Round	L 41–54	13–21	Alumni Hall (476); Providence, RI
*Non-conference game. ^{#}Rankings from AP Poll. (#) Tournament seedings in parentheses. All times are in Eastern.
