= 2023–24 Penn Quakers women's basketball team =

American college basketball season

2023–24 Penn Quakers women's basketball
- Conference: Ivy League
- Record: 15–13 (7–7 Ivy)
- Head coach: Mike McLaughlin (15th season)
- Associate head coach: Kelly Killion
- Assistant coach: Andre Gibbs
- Home arena: The Palestra

2023–24 Ivy League women's basketball standings
	Conf.				Overall
Team	W		L	PCT	W		L	PCT
Princeton †	13	–	1	.929	25	–	5	.833
Columbia	13	–	1	.929	23	–	7	.767
Harvard	9	–	5	.643	16	–	12	.571
Penn	7	–	7	.500	15	–	13	.536
Brown	7	–	7	.500	16	–	11	.593
Yale	5	–	9	.357	8	–	19	.296
Cornell	1	–	13	.071	7	–	19	.269
Dartmouth	1	–	13	.071	7	–	19	.269
† 2024 Ivy League tournament winner

The 2023–24 Penn Quakers women's basketball team represented the University of Pennsylvania during the 2023–24 NCAA Division I women's basketball season. The Quakers, led by 15th-year head coach Mike McLaughlin, played their home games at the Palestra in Philadelphia, Pennsylvania as members of the Ivy League. They finished the season 15–13, 7–7 in Ivy League play, to finish in a tie for fourth place. Their season concluded with a five-point semifinals loss to Princeton in the Ivy League tournament.

== Previous season ==
The Quakers finished the 2022–23 season 17–12, 9–5 in Ivy League play, to finish in a tie for third place. They were defeated by top-seeded Princeton in the semifinals of the Ivy League tournament. They received an at-large bid into the WNIT, where they were defeated by Richmond in the first round.

== Roster ==
2023–24 Penn Quakers women's basketball team
Players
Coaches

Pos.	#	Name	Height	Year	Previous school	Hometown
F	0	Jordan Obi (C)	6 ft 1 in (1.85 m)	Sr	Choate Rosemary Hall	Hartford, CT
G	2	Marianna Papazoglou	5 ft 10 in (1.78 m)	Jr	Wildwood Catholic Academy	Wildwood, NJ
F	3	Iyanna Rogers	6 ft 1 in (1.85 m)	Jr	Highland Springs High School	Richmond, VA
PG	4	Saniah Caldwell	5 ft 9 in (1.75 m)	So	Saddle River Day School	Franklin Lakes, NJ
G	5	Stina Almqvist	6 ft 1 in (1.85 m)	Jr	Marks Gymnasium	Kinna, Sweden
C	10	Tina Njike	6 ft 2 in (1.88 m)	Fr	Skyline High School	Salt Lake City, UT
G	11	Simone Sawyer	5 ft 11 in (1.8 m)	So	Stevenson High School	Lincolnshire, IL
G	12	Michaela Stanfield (C)	5 ft 11 in (1.8 m)	Sr	Winsor School	Needham, MA
F	14	Floor Toonders (C)	6 ft 4 in (1.93 m)	Sr	Calandlyceum Amsterdam	Wageningen, Netherlands
G	15	Georgia Heine	6 ft 0 in (1.83 m)	So	Manasquan High School	Spring Lake Heights, NJ
G	20	Abby Sharpe	6 ft 0 in (1.83 m)	Fr	Plymouth-Whitemarsh High School	Lafayette Hill, PA
G	22	Mataya Gayle	5 ft 7 in (1.7 m)	Fr	River Ridge High School	Woodstock, GA
G	23	Ese Ogbevire	5 ft 7 in (1.7 m)	Fr	Fulshear High School	Katy, TX
F	24	Helena Lasic	6 ft 4 in (1.93 m)	So	Westtown School	Brampton, ON
G	32	Lizzy Groetsch	5 ft 10 in (1.78 m)	Jr	North Allegheny High School	Sewickley, PA
F	34	Tobi Ademuwagun	5 ft 10 in (1.78 m)	Fr	Jordan High School	Houston, TX

Head coach

- Mike McLaughlin (Holy Family)

Assistant coach(es)

- Kelly Killion (Holy Family)
- Andre Gibbs (Philadelphia)

Legend

- (C) Team captain
- (S) Suspended
- (I) Ineligible
- (W) Walk-on
- Injured
- Current redshirt

Roster
Last update: February 11, 2024

== Schedule and results ==
Date time, TV	Rank^{#}	Opponent^{#}	Result	Record	Site (attendance) city, state
Non-conference regular season
November 11, 2023*; 12:00 p.m., ESPN+		Marist	W 74–51	1–0	The Palestra (563); Philadelphia, PA
November 14, 2023*; 6:00 p.m., ESPN+		Saint Joseph's; Big 5	L 49–77	1–1	The Palestra (273); Philadelphia, PA
November 19, 2023*; 2:00 p.m., ESPN+		at Siena	W 85–79	2–1	UHY Center (709); Loudonville, NY
November 22, 2023*; 4:00 p.m., SCIAC Network		at Chapman	W 92–46	3–1	Hutton Sports Center (143); Orange, CA
November 25, 2023*; 4:00 p.m., MWN		at San Diego State	L 49–74	3–2	Viejas Arena (1,758); San Diego, CA
November 26, 2023*; 5:00 p.m., ESPN+		at UC San Diego	W 76–68	4–2	LionTree Arena (589); La Jolla, CA
November 29, 2023*; 6:00 p.m., NBCSP+/ESPN+		La Salle; Big 5	W 79–71	5–2	The Palestra (573); Philadelphia, PA
December 3, 2023*; 2:00 p.m., FloHoops		at No. 23 Marquette	L 52–87	5–3	Al McGuire Center (922); Milwaukee, WI
December 5, 2023*; 7:00 p.m., FloHoops		at Villanova; Big 5	L 62–68	5–4	Finneran Pavilion (1,141); Villanova, PA
December 8, 2023*; 7:00 p.m., NEC Front Row		at Merrimack	W 71–62	6–4	Hammel Court (413); North Andover, MA
December 10, 2023*; 2:00 p.m., ESPN+		at Temple; Big 5	L 47–61	6–5	Liacouras Center (1,364); Philadelphia, PA
December 30, 2023*; 1:00 p.m., ESPN+		Maine	W 72–69	7–5	The Palestra (612); Philadelphia, PA
December 31, 2023*; 1:00 p.m., ESPN+		Gwynedd Mercy	W 89–34	8–5	The Palestra (428); Philadelphia, PA
Ivy League regular season
January 6, 2024; 2:00 p.m., ESPN+		at Columbia	L 66–79	8–6 (0–1)	Levien Gymnasium (1,202); New York, NY
January 13, 2024; 1:00 p.m., ESPN+		at Dartmouth	W 53–39	9–6 (1–1)	Leede Arena (694); Hanover, NH
January 15, 2024; 2:00 p.m., ESPN+		Cornell	W 67–54	10–6 (2–1)	The Palestra (982); Philadelphia, PA
January 20, 2024; 2:00 p.m., ESPN+		at Harvard	L 56–69	10–7 (2–2)	Lavietes Pavilion (815); Cambridge, MA
January 27, 2024; 2:00 p.m., ESPN+		Columbia	L 55–85	10–8 (2–3)	The Palestra (748); Philadelphia, PA
February 2, 2024; 6:00 p.m., ESPN+		Brown	W 77–56	11–8 (3–3)	The Palestra (361); Philadelphia, PA
February 3, 2024; 5:00 p.m., ESPN+		Yale	L 68–74 ^{OT}	11–9 (3–4)	The Palestra (557); Philadelphia, PA
February 10, 2024; 2:00 p.m., ESPN+		No. 25 Princeton	L 54–67	11–10 (3–5)	The Palestra (1,086); Philadelphia, PA
February 16, 2024; 7:00 p.m., ESPN+		at Yale	W 66–52	12–10 (4–5)	John J. Lee Amphitheater (577); New Haven, CT
February 17, 2024; 5:00 p.m., ESPN+		at Brown	L 59–61	12–11 (4–6)	Pizzitola Sports Center (526); Providence, RI
February 24, 2024; 2:00 p.m., ESPN+		at Cornell	W 61–54	13–11 (5–6)	Newman Arena (341); Ithaca, NY
March 1, 2024; 5:00 p.m., ESPN+		Dartmouth	W 79–41	14–11 (6–6)	The Palestra (768); Philadelphia, PA
March 2, 2024; 4:00 p.m., ESPN+		Harvard	W 69–67	15–11 (7–6)	The Palestra (1,093); Philadelphia, PA
March 9, 2024; 2:00 p.m., ESPN+		at Princeton	L 55–72	15–12 (7–7)	Jadwin Gymnasium (1,684); Princeton, NJ
Ivy League tournament
March 15, 2024; 4:30 p.m., ESPN+	(4)	vs. (1) Princeton; Semifinals	L 54–59	15–13	Levien Gymnasium (1,552); New York, NY
*Non-conference game. ^{#}Rankings from AP poll. (#) Tournament seedings in parentheses. All times are in Eastern.
