= Dayna Smith (basketball) =

American basketball player and coach

Current position
- Title: Director of player development
- Team: UMass
- Conference: Atlantic 10

Playing career
- 1992–1996: Rhode Island

Coaching career (HC unless noted)
- 1996–1999: Rhode Island (assistant)
- 1999: Rhode Island (interim HC)
- 1999–2002: Penn (assistant)
- 2002–2024: Cornell

Administrative career (AD unless noted)
- 2024–present: UMass (Women's Basketball; Director of Player Development)

Dayna Smith is an American basketball player and coach who is currently the director of player development for the UMass Minutewomen basketball team. She previously was the head coach of the Cornell Big Red women's basketball team for 22 seasons from 2002 until 2024.

== Coaching career ==
She was dismissed following a disappointing 2023–24 season where the team was tied for last-place in Ivy League standings. During her tenure at Cornell, the women's basketball team won one regular season conference championship and qualified for one NCAA Division I women's basketball tournament, both in 2008.

=== Administrative career ===
On September 5, 2024, Smith was hired as director of player development for the UMass Minutewomen basketball team.

== Head coaching record ==
Statistics overview
Season	Team	Overall	Conference	Standing	Postseason
Cornell Big Red (Atlantic 10 Conference) (2003–2024)
2002–03	Cornell	10–17	4–10	4th	
2003–04	Cornell	9–18	4–10	7th	
2004–05	Cornell	3–24	1–13	8th	
2005–06	Cornell	8–19	5–9	5th	
2006–07	Cornell	12–15	8–6	3rd	
2007–08	Cornell	20–9	12–3	1st	NCAA First Round
2008–09	Cornell	10–16	6–7	4th	
2009–10	Cornell	7–20	2–12	7th	
2010–11	Cornell	6–22	3–11	7th	
2011–12	Cornell	12–16	6–8	5th	
2012–13	Cornell	13–15	5–9	5th	
2013–14	Cornell	14–14	6–8	5th	
2014–15	Cornell	15–13	6–8	5th	
2015–16	Cornell	14–14	6–8	5th	
2016–17	Cornell	16–11	7–7	4th	
2017–18	Cornell	7–20	3–11	6th	
2018–19	Cornell	12–14	6–8	4th	
2019–20	Cornell	10–16	3–11	7th	
2020–21	Cornell	Season Cancelled			
2021–22	Cornell	9–16	4–10	6th	
Cornell:		224–345 (.394)	97–170 (.363)		
Total:		224–345 (.394)			
National champion Postseason invitational champion Conference regular season champion Conference regular season and conference tournament champion Division regular season champion Division regular season and conference tournament champion Conference tournament champion
