= 2023–24 Yale Bulldogs women's basketball team =

American college basketball season

2023–24 Yale Bulldogs women's basketball
- Conference: Ivy League
- Record: 8–19 (5–9 Ivy)
- Head coach: Dalila Eshe (2nd season)
- Assistant coaches: Amber Raisner; Helen Tau; Hannah Early Vaughn
- Home arena: John J. Lee Amphitheater

2023–24 Ivy League women's basketball standings
	Conf.				Overall
Team	W		L	PCT	W		L	PCT
Princeton †	13	–	1	.929	25	–	5	.833
Columbia	13	–	1	.929	23	–	7	.767
Harvard	9	–	5	.643	16	–	12	.571
Penn	7	–	7	.500	15	–	13	.536
Brown	7	–	7	.500	16	–	11	.593
Yale	5	–	9	.357	8	–	19	.296
Cornell	1	–	13	.071	7	–	19	.269
Dartmouth	1	–	13	.071	7	–	19	.269
† 2024 Ivy League tournament winner

The 2023–24 Yale Bulldogs women's basketball team represented Yale University during the 2023–24 NCAA Division I women's basketball season. The Bulldogs, led by second-year head coach Dalila Eshe, played their home games at John J. Lee Amphitheater in New Haven, Connecticut as members of the Ivy League.

The Bulldogs finished the season 8–19, 5–9 in Ivy League play, to finish in sixth place. They failed to qualify for the Ivy League tournament, as only the top four teams qualify.

== Previous season ==
The Bulldogs finished the 2022–23 season 13–14, 7–7 in Ivy League play, to finish in fifth place. They failed to qualify for the Ivy League tournament.

== Roster ==
2023–24 Yale Bulldogs women's basketball team
Players
Coaches

Pos.	#	Name	Height	Year	Previous school	Hometown
G	0	Lilah Grubman	5 ft 10 in (1.78 m)	So	Syosset High School	Syosset, NY
G	1	Jenna Clark	5 ft 7 in (1.7 m)	Sr	Thomas Jefferson High School	Pittsburgh, PA
G	3	Christen McCann	5 ft 9 in (1.75 m)	Jr	Lincoln Park Academy	Port St. Lucie, FL
G	4	Lucy Lynn	5 ft 7 in (1.7 m)	Fr	Gonzaga Prep	Liberty Lake, WA
G	11	Klara Astrom	5 ft 9 in (1.75 m)	Sr	Pinewood School	Menlo Park, CA
F	13	Haley Sabol	6 ft 2 in (1.88 m)	Sr	Episcopal High School	Pittsburgh, PA
F	20	Grace Thybulle	6 ft 3 in (1.91 m)	Jr	Irvington High School	Irvington, NY
G	21	Kiley Capstraw	5 ft 10 in (1.78 m)	So	West Orange High School	West Orange, NJ
F	22	Brenna McDonald	6 ft 3 in (1.91 m)	Sr	Natick High School	Natick, MA
G	23	Lola Lesmond	6 ft 0 in (1.83 m)	So	Worcester Academy	Six-Fours-les-Plages, France
G/F	24	Mackenzie Egger	5 ft 11 in (1.8 m)	Jr	Mount Pleasant High School	Mount Pleasant, MI
G	30	Nyla McGill	5 ft 8 in (1.73 m)	Jr	Providence High School	Charlotte, NC

Head coach

- Dalila Eshe (Florida)

Assistant coach(es)

- Amber Raisner (Union (NY))
- Helen Tau (Texas)
- Hannah Early Vaughn (Davidson)

Legend

- (C) Team captain
- (S) Suspended
- (I) Ineligible
- (W) Walk-on
- Injured
- Current redshirt

Roster
Last update: February 12, 2024

== Schedule and results ==
Date time, TV	Rank^{#}	Opponent^{#}	Result	Record	Site (attendance) city, state
Non-conference regular season
November 7, 2023*; 7:00 p.m., ACCNX		at Pittsburgh	L 74–79	0–1	Petersen Events Center (1,199); Pittsburgh, PA
November 11, 2023*; 12:00 p.m., ESPN+		Saint Joseph's	L 45–66	0–2	John J. Lee Amphitheater (475); New Haven, CT
November 14, 2023*; 6:00 p.m., ESPN+		at Boston University	L 53–60	0–3	Case Gym (605); Boston, MA
November 17, 2023*; 6:00 p.m., ESPN+		at Lehigh	L 75–90	0–4	Stabler Arena (494); Bethlehem, PA
November 20, 2023*; 8:30 p.m., ESPN+		at Pacific	L 59–66	0–5	Alex G. Spanos Center (629); Stockton, CA
November 21, 2023*; 7:00 p.m., ESPN+		at San Francisco	L 59–75	0–6	War Memorial Gymnasium (–); San Francisco, CA
November 28, 2023*; 7:00 p.m., ESPN+		Marist	W 61–45	1–6	John J. Lee Amphitheater (324); New Haven, CT
December 1, 2023*; 7:00 p.m., ESPN+		UMass	W 70–62	2–6	John J. Lee Amphitheater (324); New Haven, CT
December 3, 2023*; 1:00 p.m., NESN		at Merrimack	L 73–84	2–7	Hammel Court (671); North Andover, MA
December 6, 2023*; 1:00 p.m., SNY/FloHoops		at Stony Brook	L 66–81	2–8	Island Federal Arena (518); Stony Brook, NY
December 9, 2023*; 12:00 p.m., ESPN+		Providence	L 58–63	2–9	John J. Lee Amphitheater (411); New Haven, CT
December 21, 2023*; 12:00 p.m., ESPN+		St. John's	L 56–75	2–10	John J. Lee Amphitheater (270); New Haven, CT
December 30, 2023*; 1:00 p.m., ESPN+		Quinnipiac	W 72–48	3–10	John J. Lee Amphitheater (572); New Haven, CT
Ivy League regular season
January 6, 2024; 1:00 p.m., ESPN+		at Harvard	L 54–73	3–11 (0–1)	Lavietes Pavilion (703); Cambridge, MA
January 13, 2024; 2:00 p.m., ESPN+		Brown	L 71–76	3–12 (0–2)	John J. Lee Amphitheater (398); New Haven, CT
January 15, 2024; 2:00 p.m., SNY/ESPN+		at Columbia	L 52–88	3–13 (0–3)	Levien Gymnasium (1,397); New York, NY
January 20, 2024; 1:00 p.m., ESPN+		Dartmouth	W 48–46	4–13 (1–3)	John J. Lee Amphitheater (–); New Haven, CT
January 27, 2024; 1:00 p.m., ESPN+		Harvard	L 52–61	4–14 (1–4)	John J. Lee Amphitheater (517); New Haven, CT
February 2, 2024; 7:00 p.m., NBCSP/SNY		at No. 25 Princeton	L 59–79	4–15 (1–5)	Jadwin Gymnasium (1,074); Princeton, NJ
February 3, 2024; 5:00 p.m., NBCSP+		at Penn	W 74–68 ^{OT}	5–15 (2–5)	The Palestra (557); Philadelphia, PA
February 10, 2024; 2:00 p.m., ESPN+		at Cornell	W 66–59	6–15 (3–5)	Newman Arena (183); Ithaca, NY
February 16, 2024; 7:00 p.m., ESPN+		Penn	L 52–66	6–16 (3–6)	John J. Lee Amphitheater (577); New Haven, CT
February 17, 2024; 6:00 p.m., ESPN+		No. 25 Princeton	L 25–70	6–17 (3–7)	John J. Lee Amphitheater (545); New Haven, CT
February 24, 2024; 1:00 p.m., ESPN+		at Dartmouth	W 78–42	7–17 (4–7)	Leede Arena (638); Hanover, NH
March 1, 2024; 4:00 p.m., ESPN+		Cornell	W 79–72	8–17 (5–7)	John J. Lee Amphitheater (447); New Haven, CT
March 2, 2024; 3:00 p.m., ESPN+		Columbia	L 50–76	8–18 (5–8)	John J. Lee Amphitheater; New Haven, CT
March 9, 2024; 3:00 p.m., ESPN+		at Brown	L 57–76	8–19 (5–9)	Pizzitola Sports Center (515); Providence, RI
*Non-conference game. ^{#}Rankings from AP poll. (#) Tournament seedings in parentheses. All times are in Eastern.
