= 2023–24 Brown Bears women's basketball team =

American college basketball season

2023–24 Brown Bears women's basketball
- Conference: Ivy League
- Record: 16–11 (7–7 Ivy)
- Head coach: Monique LeBlanc (4th season)
- Assistant coaches: Tyler Patch; Clint Williams; Brianna Thomas
- Home arena: Pizzitola Sports Center

2023–24 Ivy League women's basketball standings
| | Conf. | | | | Overall |
| Team | W | | L | PCT | W | | L | PCT |
|---|---|---|---|---|---|---|---|---|
| Princeton † | 13 | – | 1 | .929 | 25 | – | 5 | .833 |
| Columbia | 13 | – | 1 | .929 | 23 | – | 7 | .767 |
| Harvard | 9 | – | 5 | .643 | 16 | – | 12 | .571 |
| Penn | 7 | – | 7 | .500 | 15 | – | 13 | .536 |
| Brown | 7 | – | 7 | .500 | 16 | – | 11 | .593 |
| Yale | 5 | – | 9 | .357 | 8 | – | 19 | .296 |
| Cornell | 1 | – | 13 | .071 | 7 | – | 19 | .269 |
| Dartmouth | 1 | – | 13 | .071 | 7 | – | 19 | .269 |
† 2024 Ivy League tournament winner

The 2023–24 Brown Bears women's basketball team represented Brown University during the 2023–24 NCAA Division I women's basketball season. The Bears, led by fourth-year head coach Monique LeBlanc, played their home games at the Pizzitola Sports Center located in Providence, Rhode Island, as members of the Ivy League. They finished the season 16–11 overall, and 7–7 in Ivy League play, to tie for fourth place.

== Previous season ==
The Bears finished the 2022–23 season 11–15, 4–10 in Ivy League play, to finish in sixth place. They failed to qualify for the Ivy League tournament.

== Roster ==
2023–24 Brown Bears women's basketball team
Players
Coaches

| Pos. | # | Name | Height | Year | Previous school | Hometown |
|---|---|---|---|---|---|---|
| F | 0 | Mya Murray | 6 ft 2 in (1.88 m) | Sr | Uniontown Area High School | Uniontown, PA |
| G | 2 | Kyla Jones | 5 ft 9 in (1.75 m) | Sr | Worcester Academy | Chicago, IL |
| G | 3 | Grace Kirk | 5 ft 5 in (1.65 m) | Sr | Marshall School | Duluth, MN |
| G | 4 | Isabella Mauricio | 5 ft 4 in (1.63 m) | Jr | Amador Valley High School | Pleasanton, CA |
| G | 5 | Olivia Young | 5 ft 11 in (1.8 m) | Fr | Cardinal Gibbons High School | Durham, NC |
| G | 10 | Lexy Calhoun | 5 ft 8 in (1.73 m) | So | Harriton High School | Barrington, RI |
| F | 11 | Alyssa Moreland | 5 ft 11 in (1.8 m) | So | Tilton School | Beverly, MA |
| G | 13 | Charlotte Jewell | 5 ft 7 in (1.7 m) | Sr | Thomas A. Edison High School | Alexandria, VA |
| G | 14 | Mady Calhoun | 5 ft 10 in (1.78 m) | So | Barrington High School | Barrington, RI |
| F | 15 | Beth Nelson | 6 ft 0 in (1.83 m) | So | Oakland High School | Murfreesboro, TN |
| G | 21 | Grace Arnolie | 5 ft 8 in (1.73 m) | So | James Madison High School | Vienna, VA |
| G | 22 | Mackenzie Leahy | 5 ft 8 in (1.73 m) | So | Jacobs High School | West Dundee, IL |
| F | 23 | Ada Anamekwe | 6 ft 0 in (1.83 m) | So | Plano East High School | Parker, TX |
| F/C | 24 | Amiya Hopkins | 6 ft 2 in (1.88 m) | Fr | North Crowley High School | Fort Worth, TX |
| C | 25 | Gianna Aiello | 6 ft 4 in (1.93 m) | Jr | Matawan Regional High School | Matawan, NJ |

Head coach

- Monique LeBlanc (Bucknell)

Assistant coach(es)

- Tyler Patch (Rhode Island College)
- Clint Williams (Tuskegee)
- Brianna Thomas (Duquesne)

Legend

- (C) Team captain
- (S) Suspended
- (I) Ineligible
- (W) Walk-on
- Injured
- Current redshirt

Roster
Last update: February 11, 2024

== Schedule and results ==
| Date time, TV | Rank^{#} | Opponent^{#} | Result | Record | Site (attendance) city, state |
Non-conference regular season
| November 6, 2023*; 7:00 p.m., ESPN+ | | Florida Gulf Coast | L 58–80 | 0–1 | Pizzitola Sports Center (648); Providence, RI |
| November 9, 2023*; 7:00 p.m., ESPN+ | | at Holy Cross | L 54–62 | 0–2 | Hart Center (617); Worcester, MA |
| November 12, 2023*; 2:00 p.m., FloHoops | | at Georgetown | W 45–43 | 1–2 | McDonough Arena (417); Washington, D.C. |
| November 15, 2023*; 7:00 p.m., ESPN+ | | Providence | W 61–56 | 2–2 | Pizzitola Sports Center (214); Providence, RI |
| November 17, 2023*; 7:00 p.m., ESPN+ | | Rhode Island | L 56–67 | 2–3 | Pizzitola Sports Center (367); Providence, RI |
| November 22, 2023*; 2:00 p.m., ESPN+ | | at Loyola Chicago | W 56–49 | 3–3 | Joseph J. Gentile Arena (201); Chicago, IL |
| November 26, 2023*; 2:00 p.m., FloHoops | | at Monmouth | W 59–58 | 4–3 | OceanFirst Bank Center (605); West Long Branch, NJ |
| November 29, 2023*; 6:00 p.m., ESPN+ | | at Bryant | W 58–53 | 5–3 | Chace Athletic Center (315); Smithfield, RI |
| December 3, 2023*; 2:00 p.m., ESPN+ | | Johnson & Wales | W 90–35 | 6–3 | Pizzitola Sports Center (238); Providence, RI |
| December 5, 2023*; 7:00 p.m., NESN/ESPN+ | | UMass Lowell | W 74–54 | 7–3 | Pizzitola Sports Center (138); Providence, RI |
| December 9, 2023*; 12:00 p.m., ESPN+ | | at New Hampshire | W 53–52 | 8–3 | Lundholm Gym (218); Durham, NH |
| December 30, 2023*; 5:00 p.m., ESPN+ | | at San Diego | W 70–61 | 9–3 | Jenny Craig Pavilion (413); San Diego, CA |
| January 1, 2024*; 4:00 p.m., ESPN+ | | at San Francisco | L 70–75 | 9–4 | War Memorial Gymnasium (348); San Francisco, CA |
Ivy League regular season
| January 6, 2024; 1:00 p.m., ESPN+ | | at Dartmouth | W 65–39 | 10–4 (1–0) | Leede Arena (513); Hanover, NH |
| January 13, 2024; 2:00 p.m., NESN+ | | at Yale | W 76–71 | 11–4 (2–0) | John J. Lee Amphitheater (398); New Haven, CT |
| January 15, 2024; 3:00 p.m., ESPN+ | | Harvard | L 59–73 | 11–5 (2–1) | Pizzitola Sports Center (627); Providence, RI |
| January 20, 2024; 2:00 p.m., ESPN+ | | at Cornell | W 64–53 | 12–5 (3–1) | Newman Arena (431); Ithaca, NY |
| January 27, 2024; 3:00 p.m., ESPN+ | | Dartmouth | W 35–31 | 13–5 (4–1) | Pizzitola Sports Center (497); Providence, RI |
| February 2, 2024; 6:00 p.m., ESPN+ | | at Penn | L 56–77 | 13–6 (4–2) | The Palestra (361); Philadelphia, PA |
| February 3, 2024; 5:00 p.m., ESPN+ | | at No. 25 Princeton | L 63–76 | 13–7 (4–3) | Jadwin Gymnasium (2,710); Princeton, NJ |
| February 9, 2024; 7:00 p.m., ESPN+ | | at Columbia | L 73–90 | 13–8 (4–4) | Levien Gymnasium (1,245); New York, NY |
| February 16, 2024; 7:00 p.m., ESPN+ | | No. 25 Princeton | L 62–74 | 13–9 (4–5) | Pizzitola Sports Center (307); Providence, RI |
| February 17, 2024; 5:00 p.m., ESPN+ | | Penn | W 61–59 | 14–9 (5–5) | Pizzitola Sports Center (526); Providence, RI |
| February 24, 2024; 2:00 p.m., ESPN+ | | at Harvard | L 73–80 | 14–10 (5–6) | Lavietes Pavilion (872); Cambridge, MA |
| March 1, 2024; 4:00 p.m., ESPN+ | | Columbia | L 62–77 | 14–11 (5–7) | Pizzitola Sports Center (277); Providence, RI |
| March 2, 2024; 3:00 p.m., ESPN+ | | Cornell | W 75–66 | 15–11 (6–7) | Pizzitola Sports Center (364); Providence, RI |
| March 9, 2024; 3:00 p.m., ESPN+ | | Yale | W 76–57 | 16–11 (7–7) | Pizzitola Sports Center (515); Providence, RI |
*Non-conference game. ^{#}Rankings from AP poll. (#) Tournament seedings in parentheses. All times are in Eastern.
