= 2024 Ivy League women's basketball tournament =

American college basketball tournament

- Classification: Division I
- Season: 2023–24
- Teams: 4
- Site: Levien Gymnasium; New York City
- Champions: Princeton (5th title)
- Winning coach: Carla Berube (3rd title)
- Television: ESPNews, ESPN+

2023–24 Ivy League women's basketball standings
| | Conf. | | | | Overall |
| Team | W | | L | PCT | W | | L | PCT |
|---|---|---|---|---|---|---|---|---|
| Princeton † | 13 | – | 1 | .929 | 25 | – | 5 | .833 |
| Columbia | 13 | – | 1 | .929 | 23 | – | 7 | .767 |
| Harvard | 9 | – | 5 | .643 | 16 | – | 12 | .571 |
| Penn | 7 | – | 7 | .500 | 15 | – | 13 | .536 |
| Brown | 7 | – | 7 | .500 | 16 | – | 11 | .593 |
| Yale | 5 | – | 9 | .357 | 8 | – | 19 | .296 |
| Cornell | 1 | – | 13 | .071 | 7 | – | 19 | .269 |
| Dartmouth | 1 | – | 13 | .071 | 7 | – | 19 | .269 |
† 2024 Ivy League tournament winner

The 2024 Ivy League Women's Basketball Tournament, popularly referred to as "Ivy Madness", was the postseason women's basketball tournament for the Ivy League of the 2023–24 NCAA Division I women's basketball season. It was held on March 15 and 16, 2024 at the Levien Gymnasium on the campus of Columbia University in New York City. The winner, the Princeton Tigers, received the Ivy League's automatic bid to the 2024 NCAA Tournament.

== Seeds ==
The top four teams in the Ivy League regular-season standings qualified for the tournament and will be seeded according to their records in conference play, resulting in a Shaughnessy playoff. If a tie for any of the top four positions exists, tiebreakers are applied in the following order:

- Head-to-head record between teams involved in the tie.
- Record against the top team(s) not involved in the tie in order of conference record, going down through the seedings until the tie is broken.
- Average of the teams' ranking in the following computer systems: NCAA NET Ranking.
- If a tie persists, a draw shall be conducted by the executive director following the last contest of the regular season.

| Seed | School | Record | Tiebreaker |
|---|---|---|---|
| 1 | Princeton | 13–1 | Higher NET |
| 2 | Columbia | 13–1 | Lower NET |
| 3 | Harvard | 9–5 | |
| 4 | Penn | 7–7 | 1–1 vs. Harvard |
| DNQ | Brown | 7–7 | 0–2 vs. Harvard |
| DNQ | Yale | 5–9 | |
| DNQ | Cornell | 1–13 | Higher NET |
| DNQ | Dartmouth | 1–13 | Lower NET |

== Schedule ==
| Session | Game | Time | Matchup | Score | Television | Attendance |
Semifinals – Friday, March 15
| 1 | 1 | 4:30 pm | No. 1 Princeton vs. No. 4 Penn | 59–54 | ESPN+ | 1,552 |
| 1 | 2 | 7:00 pm | No. 2 Columbia vs. No. 3 Harvard | 63–61 | ESPN+ | 2,598 |
Championship – Saturday, March 16
| 2 | 3 | 5:00 pm | No. 1 Princeton vs. No. 2 Columbia | 75-58 | ESPNews | 2,703 |
Game times in Eastern Time. Rankings denote tournament seeding.

== Bracket ==
Semifinals; Friday, March 15; ESPN+
1 | Princeton | 59
4 | Penn | 54
2 | Columbia | 63
3 | Harvard | 61

Championship; Saturday, March 16; ESPNews
1 | Princeton | 75
2 | Columbia | 58

== See also ==
- 2024 Ivy League men's basketball tournament
