= 2023–24 Stony Brook Seawolves women's basketball team =

American college basketball season

2023–24 Stony Brook Seawolves women's basketball

CAA regular-season champions

WBIT, second round
- Conference: Coastal Athletic Association
- Record: 28–5 (16–2 CAA)
- Head coach: Ashley Langford (3rd season)
- Associate head coach: Steve Pogue
- Assistant coaches: Shireyll Moore; Rena Wakama
- Home arena: Island Federal Arena

2023–24 CAA women's basketball standings
	Conf.				Overall
Team	W		L	PCT	W		L	PCT
Stony Brook	16	–	2	.889	28	–	5	.848
Monmouth	14	–	4	.778	22	–	10	.688
Charleston	13	–	5	.722	22	–	10	.688
North Carolina A&T	13	–	5	.722	22	–	12	.647
William & Mary	12	–	6	.667	15	–	14	.517
Towson	11	–	7	.611	20	–	11	.645
Drexel †	10	–	8	.556	19	–	15	.559
Campbell	9	–	9	.500	17	–	14	.548
Elon	7	–	11	.389	11	–	21	.344
Delaware	7	–	11	.389	11	–	20	.355
Northeastern	5	–	13	.278	10	–	17	.370
Hampton	3	–	15	.167	3	–	26	.103
Hofstra	3	–	15	.167	11	–	21	.344
UNC Wilmington	3	–	15	.167	5	–	25	.167
† 2024 CAA tournament winner

The 2023–24 Stony Brook Seawolves women's basketball team represented Stony Brook University during the 2023–24 NCAA Division I women's basketball season. The Seawolves, led by third-year head coach Ashley Langford, played their home games at the Island Federal Arena in Stony Brook, New York as second-year members of the Coastal Athletic Association (CAA).

During this season, Stony Brook notably had an all-Black coaching staff at a PWI (Predominantly White Institution), a rarity in college sports.

== Previous season ==
The Seawolves finished the 2022–23 season 18–13, 11–7 in CAA play, to finish in sixth place. As the #6 seed in the CAA tournament, they defeated #11 seed Elon in the second round, before falling to #3 seed Northeastern in the quarterfinals.

== Roster ==
2023–24 Stony Brook Seawolves women's basketball team
Players
Coaches

Pos.	#	Name	Height	Year	Previous school	Hometown
G	0	Gigi Gonzalez	5 ft 8 in (1.73 m)	GS	Nova High School	Miramar, FL
F	1	Dallysshya Moreno	6 ft 0 in (1.83 m)	Fr	Baldwin High School	Baldwin, NY
G	2	Zaida Gonzalez	5 ft 9 in (1.75 m)	Jr	FIU	West Palm Beach, FL
G	3	Janay Brantley	6 ft 0 in (1.83 m)	Fr	Catskill High School	Catskill, NY
G	4	Victoria Keenan	5 ft 7 in (1.7 m)	GS	Seton Hall	Bethlehem, PA
G	5	Breauna Ware	5 ft 8 in (1.73 m)	So	St. Bonaventure	Queens, NY
F	12	Delaney Yarborough	6 ft 3 in (1.91 m)	So	McDonogh School	Ellicott City, MD
G	15	Shamarla King	6 ft 0 in (1.83 m)	Sr	Virginia Tech	Hartford, CT
F	20	Nyajuok Toang	6 ft 0 in (1.83 m)	Sr	Saint Louis	Des Moines, IA
G	21	Kelis Corley	5 ft 10 in (1.78 m)	Sr	St. John's College High School	Capitol Heights, MD
F	22	Sherese Pittman	6 ft 2 in (1.88 m)	Jr	James Madison	Richmond, VA
F	23	Lauren Filien	6 ft 1 in (1.85 m)	So	Columbia High School	Cohoes, NY
F	24	Hannah Simmons	5 ft 9 in (1.75 m)	Fr	Chesapeake Math & IT High School	Brandywine, MD
F/C	25	Khari Clark	6 ft 2 in (1.88 m)	GS	Loyola Marymount	Denver, CO
G	30	Khalis Whiting	5 ft 6 in (1.68 m)	So	Abington High School	Philadelphia, PA
F	33	Elizabeth Field	6 ft 3 in (1.91 m)	Jr	Tilton School	Manchester, NH

Head coach

- Ashley Langford (Tulane)

Assistant coach(es)

- Steve Pogue (Nyack)
- Shireyll Moore (Fairfield)
- Rena Wakama (Western Carolina)

Legend

- (C) Team captain
- (S) Suspended
- (I) Ineligible
- (W) Walk-on
- Injured
- Current redshirt

Roster
Last update: January 19, 2024

== Schedule and results ==
Date time, TV	Rank^{#}	Opponent^{#}	Result	Record	High points	High rebounds	High assists	Site (attendance) city, state
Exhibition
November 2, 2023*; 7:00 p.m.		Adelphi	W 71–62	–	–	–	–	Island Federal Arena; Stony Brook, NY
Non-conference regular season
November 6, 2023*; 6:31 p.m., SNY/FloHoops		Columbia	W 85–73	1–0	18 – 2 tied	10 – Clark	7 – Pittman	Island Federal Arena (905); Stony Brook, NY
November 11, 2023*; 2:00 p.m., NEC Front Row		at Le Moyne	W 82–61	2–0	19 – Clark	8 – Clark	7 – 3 tied	Ted Grant Court (368); DeWitt, NY
November 15, 2023*; 5:30 p.m., DSN		at Maryland Eastern Shore	W 76–63	3–0	18 – Clark	10 – Clark	4 – Z. Gonzalez	Hytche Athletic Center (186); Princess Anne, MD
November 19, 2023*; 1:00 p.m., FloHoops		Holy Cross	W 68–55	4–0	17 – Clark	9 – 2 tied	4 – Brantley	Island Federal Arena (836); Stony Brook, NY
November 22, 2023*; 12:00 p.m., SNY/FloHoops		Delaware State	W 86–41	5–0	15 – Clark	8 – 2 tied	10 – G. Gonzalez	Island Federal Arena (920); Stony Brook, NY
November 26, 2023*; 3:00 p.m., B1G+		at Minnesota	L 54–67	5–1	16 – Keenan	9 – Pittman	3 – G. Gonzalez	Williams Arena (3,122); Minneapolis, MN
December 2, 2023*; 1:00 p.m., SNY/FloHoops		Buffalo	W 83–52	6–1	26 – Z. Gonzalez	12 – Clark	8 – G. Gonzalez	Island Federal Arena (712); Stony Brook, NY
December 6, 2023*; 1:00 p.m., SNY/FloHoops		Yale	W 81–66	7–1	23 – Clark	9 – Pittman	3 – King	Island Federal Arena (518); Stony Brook, NY
December 11, 2023*; 6:31 p.m., FloHoops		Longwood	W 85–49	8–1	16 – 3 tied	10 – King	6 – G. Gonzalez	Island Federal Arena (615); Stony Brook, NY
December 21, 2023*; 1:00 p.m., ESPN+		at Iona	W 71–49	9–1	19 – G. Gonzalez	6 – Pittman	7 – G. Gonzalez	Hynes Athletics Center (623); New Rochelle, NY
December 30, 2023*; 1:00 p.m., ESPN+		at Cornell	W 81–56	10–1	21 – Clark	10 – King	9 – G. Gonzalez	Newman Arena (473); Ithaca, NY
CAA regular season
January 5, 2024; 6:31 p.m., SNY/FloHoops		Campbell	W 73–43	11–1 (1–0)	21 – Clark	9 – King	6 – G. Gonzalez	Island Federal Arena (732); Stony Brook, NY
January 7, 2024; 1:00 p.m., FloHoops		UNC Wilmington	W 68–55	12–1 (2–0)	18 – Clark	13 – Clark	9 – G. Gonzalez	Island Federal Arena (709); Stony Brook, NY
January 12, 2024; 7:00 p.m., FloHoops		at Towson	W 77–65	13–1 (3–0)	30 – G. Gonzalez	10 – Clark	3 – 3 tied	SECU Arena (789); Towson, MD
January 14, 2024; 2:00 p.m., FloHoops		at Delaware	W 79–67	14–1 (4–0)	20 – G. Gonzalez	11 – 2 tied	5 – G. Gonzalez	Bob Carpenter Center (1,185); Newark, DE
January 19, 2024; 6:31 p.m., FloHoops		Charleston	W 81–71	15–1 (5–0)	28 – Clark	7 – Pittman	8 – G. Gonzalez	Island Federal Arena (1,317); Stony Brook, NY
January 21, 2024; 2:00 p.m., FloHoops		at Campbell	L 73–75 ^{OT}	15–2 (5–1)	18 – Keenan	9 – King	5 – Gonzalez	Gore Arena (963); Buies Creek, NC
January 28, 2024; 2:00 p.m., SNY/FloHoops		Drexel	W 62–41	16–2 (6–1)	20 – Gonzalez	15 – Clark	5 – Gonzalez	Island Federal Arena (1,296); Stony Brook, NY
February 2, 2024; 7:00 p.m., FloHoops		at Hofstra; Battle of Long Island	W 67–49	17–2 (7–1)	17 – Gonzalez	8 – 3 tied	6 – Gonzalez	Mack Sports Complex (723); Hempstead, NY
February 4, 2024; 2:00 p.m., FloHoops		at Monmouth	W 78–62	18–2 (8–1)	30 – Clark	6 – 2 tied	5 – 2 tied	OceanFirst Bank Center (1,781); West Long Branch, NJ
February 9, 2024; 6:31 p.m., FloHoops		Towson	L 78–83 ^{OT}	18–3 (8–2)	23 – Clark	8 – Clark	4 – Gonzalez	Island Federal Arena (1,050); Stony Brook, NY
February 11, 2024; 2:00 p.m., FloHoops		at Northeastern	W 71–35	19–3 (9–2)	15 – Clark	9 – Clark	6 – Gonzalez	Cabot Center (312); Boston, MA
February 16, 2024; 6:31 p.m., SNY/FloHoops		Hofstra; Battle of Long Island	W 81–48	20–3 (10–2)	24 – Gonzalez	7 – Pittman	6 – Gonzalez	Island Federal Arena (1,341); Stony Brook, NY
February 18, 2024; 1:00 p.m., SNY/FloHoops		Elon	W 61–32	21–3 (11–2)	17 – Pittman	12 – Pittman	3 – Pittman	Island Federal Arena (1,310); Stony Brook, NY
February 25, 2024; 4:00 p.m., SNY/FloHoops		Northeastern	W 2–0 (Note: Forfeited due to limited roster availability for Northeastern)	21–3 (12–2)	–	–	–	Island Federal Arena; Stony Brook, NY
March 1, 2024; 6:00 p.m., FloHoops		at Drexel	W 60–58	22–3 (13–2)	22 – Pittman	8 – Pittman	6 – Gonzalez	Daskalakis Athletic Center (618); Philadelphia, PA
March 3, 2024; 2:00 p.m., SNY/FloHoops		North Carolina A&T	W 76–62	23–3 (14–2)	30 – Pittman	9 – Pittman	4 – Pittman	Island Federal Arena (1,131); Stony Brook, NY
March 7, 2024; 7:00 p.m., FloHoops		at Hampton	W 71–35	24–3 (15–2)	15 – Pittman	14 – 2 tied	3 – 2 tied	Hampton Convocation Center (644); Hampton, VA
March 9, 2024; 1:00 p.m., FloHoops		at William & Mary	W 74–68	25–3 (16–2)	22 – Gonzalez	14 – Pittman	3 – 2 tied	Kaplan Arena (1,032); Williamsburg, VA
CAA tournament
March 15, 2024; 12:00 p.m., FloHoops	(1)	vs. (8) Campbell; Quarterfinals	W 61–52	26–3	13 – Gonzalez	8 – Pittman	2 – Gonzalez	Entertainment and Sports Arena; Washington, D.C.
March 16, 2024; 2:00 p.m., FloHoops	(1)	vs. (4) North Carolina A&T; Semifinals	W 59–51	27–3	14 – Clark	8 – Pittman	3 – 2 tied	Entertainment and Sports Arena (875); Washington, D.C.
March 17, 2024; 2:00 p.m., CBSSN	(1)	vs. (7) Drexel; Championship	L 60–68	27–4	18 – Gonzalez	13 – Clark	5 – Gonzalez	Entertainment and Sports Arena (700); Washington, D.C.
WBIT
March 21, 2024; 7:00 p.m., ESPN+		at (1) James Madison; First round	W 81–70	28–4	26 – Gonzalez	9 – 2 tied	3 – Gonzalez	Atlantic Union Bank Center (922); Harrisonburg, VA
March 24, 2024; 3:00 p.m., ESPN+		at (4) Illinois; Second round	L 62–79	28–5	13 – Gonzalez	8 – King	5 – Gonzalez	State Farm Center (1,527); Champaign, IL
*Non-conference game. ^{#}Rankings from AP poll. (#) Tournament seedings in parentheses. All times are in Eastern.
