= 2023–24 DePaul Blue Demons women's basketball team =

American college basketball season

2023–24 DePaul Blue Demons women's basketball
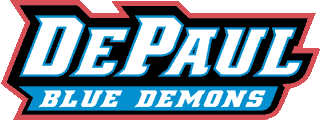
- Conference: Big East Conference
- Record: 12–20 (4–14 Big East)
- Head coach: Doug Bruno (38th season)
- Associate head coach: Jill Pizzotti
- Assistant coaches: Ashton Millender; Bradley Bruno
- Home arena: Wintrust Arena

2023–24 Big East women's basketball standings
	Conf.				Overall
Team	W		L	PCT	W		L	PCT
No. 3 UConn †	18	–	0	1.000	33	–	6	.846
No. 23 Creighton	15	–	3	.833	26	–	6	.813
St. John's	11	–	7	.611	18	–	15	.545
Villanova	11	–	7	.611	22	–	13	.629
Marquette	11	–	7	.611	23	–	9	.719
Georgetown	9	–	9	.500	23	–	12	.657
Seton Hall	8	–	10	.444	17	–	15	.531
Butler	6	–	12	.333	15	–	17	.469
Providence	6	–	12	.333	13	–	21	.382
DePaul	4	–	14	.222	12	–	20	.375
Xavier	0	–	18	.000	1	–	27	.036
† 2024 Big East tournament winner Rankings from AP poll

The 2023–24 DePaul Blue Demons women's basketball team represented DePaul University during the 2023–24 NCAA Division I women's basketball season. The Blue Demons were led by thirty-eighth year head coach Doug Bruno and played their home games at the Wintrust Arena as members of the Big East Conference.

== Previous season ==
The Blue Demons finished the season 16–17, 8–12 in Big East play to finish in seventh place. As a No. 7 seed, they defeated Providence in the first round of the Big East women's tournament before losing to Villanova in the quarterfinals.

== Offseason ==
=== Departures ===
DePaul departures
Name	Num	Pos.	Height	Year	Hometown	Reason for departure
Tara Daye	0	G	5'10"	Freshman	Newark, NJ	Transferred to St. John's
Keke Rimmer	1	G	5'10"	Senior	Maywood, IL	Graduate transferred to UIC
Madisen Wardell	5	G/F	6'0"	Freshman	Detroit, MI	Transferred to Central Michigan
Kierra Collier	11	G	5'6"	Senior	Lee Summit, MO	Graduated
Nazlah Morrow	15	F	6'1"	Senior	Chicago, IL	Graduated
Zaria Hurston	20	F	5'10"	Freshman	Decatur, GA	Transferred to Coastal Carolina
Darrione Rogers	21	G	5'11"	Junior	Chicago, IL	Transferred to Mississippi State
Aneesah Morrow	24	F	6'1"	Sophomore	Chicago, IL	Transferred to LSU
Kendall Holmes	35	G	5'11"	Junior	Plainfield, IL	Transferred to South Dakota

=== Incoming transfers ===
DePaul incoming transfers
Name	Num	Pos.	Height	Year	Hometown	Previous school
Katlyn Gilbert	0	G	5'10"	GS senior	Indianapolis, IN	Missouri
Brynn Masikewich	5	F	6'3"	GS senior	Calgary, AL	UCLA
Michelle Sidor	23	G	5'8"	GS senior	Upper Saddle River, NJ	Michigan
Kate Clarke	25	G	6'1"	Sophomore	Carmel, IN	Michigan

==== Recruiting ====
There was no recruiting class of 2023.

== Roster ==
2023–24 DePaul Blue Demons women's basketball team
Players
Coaches

Pos.	#	Name	Height	Year	Previous school	Hometown
G	0	Katlyn Gilbert	5 ft 10 in (1.78 m)	GS	Heritage Christian; Missouri	Indianapolis, IN
G	2	Grace Carstensen	5 ft 11 in (1.8 m)	Fr	Nazareth Academy	Hinsdale, IL
G/F	3	Charlece Ohiaeri	6 ft 0 in (1.83 m)	Fr	Centennial	Las Vegas, NV
F	5	Brynn Masikewich	6 ft 3 in (1.91 m)	GS	Lincoln Prep; UCLA	Calgary, AB
G	10	Haley Walker	5 ft 8 in (1.73 m)	RS Fr	Rice Memorial	Burlington, VT
G	11	Sumer Lee	5 ft 8 in (1.73 m)	Fr	King's Christian	Toronto, ON
G	12	Jade Edwards	5 ft 9 in (1.75 m)	GS	Latin; American	Chicago, IL
G	13	Maeve McErlane	5 ft 10 in (1.78 m)	So	Notre Dame	Philadelphia, PA
G	20	Shakara McCline	5 ft 6 in (1.68 m)	Fr	East St. Louis	East St. Louis, IL
G	22	Anaya Peoples	5 ft 11 in (1.8 m)	GS	Schlarman Academy; Notre Dame	Danville, IL
G	23	Michelle Sidor	5 ft 9 in (1.75 m)	GS	Saddle River Day; Michigan	Upper Saddle River, NJ
G	25	Kate Clarke	6 ft 1 in (1.85 m)	So	Carmel; Michigan	Carmel, IN
F	33	Jorie Allen	6 ft 1 in (1.85 m)	GS	North Lawrence; Indiana	Bedford, IN

Head coach

- Doug Bruno (DePaul)

Assistant coach(es)

- Jill Pizzotti (Southeast Missouri State)
- Ashton Millender (DePaul)
- Bradley Bruno (DePaul)

Legend

- (C) Team captain
- (S) Suspended
- (I) Ineligible
- (W) Walk-on
- Injured
- Current redshirt

Roster

== Schedule and results ==
Date time, TV	Rank^{#}	Opponent^{#}	Result	Record	High points	High rebounds	High assists	Site (attendance) city, state
Exhibition
October 15, 2023*; 2:00 p.m., BTN		at No. 3 Iowa; Crossover at Kinnick	L 72–94		19 – Peoples	7 – Tied	4 – McErlane	Kinnick Stadium (55,646); Iowa City, IA
October 29, 2023*; 4:00 p.m.		Lewis	W 68–45		20 – Peoples	16 – Peoples	5 – McErlane	Wintrust Arena (886); Chicago, IL
Regular season
November 6, 2023*; 7:00 p.m., FloSports		Western Michigan	W 77–53	1–0	20 – Peoples	13 – Peoples	5 – McErlane	Wintrust Arena (1,111); Chicago, IL
November 9, 2023*; 7:00 p.m., FloSports		Stonehill	W 99–52	2–0	20 – Peoples	10 – Gilbert	5 – Gilbert	Wintrust Arena (849); Chicago, IL
November 12, 2023*; 4:00 p.m., ACCN		at No. 17 Louisville	L 74–81	2–1	32 – Clarke	8 – Peoples	4 – Tied	KFC Yum! Center (7,456); Louisville, KY
November 18, 2023*; 6:30 p.m., FloSports		vs. South Dakota; Battle 4 Atlantis quarterfinals	L 71–83	2–2	22 – Peoples	7 – Tied	3 – Tied	Imperial Arena (422); Nassau, Bahamas
November 19, 2023*; 6:30 p.m., FloSports		vs. Middle Tennessee; Battle 4 Atlantis consolation 2nd round	L 69–71	2–3	18 – Peoples	6 – Tied	5 – McErlane	Imperial Arena (400); Nassau, Bahamas
November 20, 2023*; 6:30 p.m., FloSports		vs. Howard; Battle 4 Atlantis 7th place game	W 85–62	3–3	21 – Peoples	13 – Peoples	6 – Gilbert	Imperial Arena (257); Nassau, Bahamas
November 26, 2023*; 2:00 p.m., Marquee		Loyola–Chicago	W 99–52	4–3	29 – Peoples	7 – Allen	8 – Peoples	Wintrust Arena (1,469); Chicago, IL
November 30, 2023*; 7:00 p.m., CBSSN		Michigan State	L 64–102	4–4	18 – Peoples	7 – Allen	3 – Peoples	Wintrust Arena (1,174); Chicago, IL
December 5, 2023*; 11:00 a.m., FloSports		Green Bay	W 68–64	5–4	22 – Peoples	9 – Peoples	5 – Tied	Wintrust Arena (6,057); Chicago, IL
December 8, 2023*; 6:00 p.m., ACCN		at Miami (FL)	L 70–75	5–5	18 – Peoples	9 – Tied	3 – Tied	Watsco Center (2,172); Coral Gables, FL
December 13, 2023*; 7:00 p.m., Marquee		Northwestern	W 90–65	6–5	21 – Peoples	8 – Allen	7 – Peoples	Wintrust Arena (1,050); Chicago, IL
December 17, 2023*; 2:00 p.m., FloSports		Alabama State	W 98–69	7–5	26 – McErlane	10 – Peoples	4 – Tied	Wintrust Arena (1,278); Chicago, IL
December 20, 2023; 11:00 a.m., FloSports		at Xavier	W 70–55	8–5 (1–0)	15 – Peoples	8 – Gilbert	4 – Tied	Cintas Center (326); Cincinnati, OH
December 28, 2023*; 6:00 p.m., FloSports		Alcorn State	W 77–39	9–5	13 – McCline	8 – Walker	5 – Sidor	Wintrust Arena (1,183); Chicago, IL
December 31, 2023; 4:00 p.m., FloSports		Georgetown	L 62–66	9–6 (1–1)	21 – Peoples	10 – Allen	8 – Allen	Wintrust Arena (1,167); Chicago, IL
January 3, 2024; 10:00 a.m., FloSports		at Providence	L 65–72	9–7 (1–2)	25 – Gilbert	6 – Allen	2 – Tied	Alumni Hall (1,263); Providence, RI
January 6, 2024; 3:00 p.m., FS1		No. 21 Creighton	L 68–75	9–8 (1–3)	22 – Allen	10 – Allen	5 – Peoples	Wintrust Arena (1,404); Chicago, IL
January 13, 2024; 8:00 p.m., CBSSN		at No. 23 Marquette	L 47–78	9–9 (1–4)	13 – McCline	6 – Tied	3 – Allen	Al McGuire Center (1,830); Milwaukee, WI
January 16, 2024; 7:00 p.m., FloSports		Xavier	W 79–47	10–9 (2–4)	19 – Sidor	10 – Peoples	5 – Peoples	Wintrust Arena (854); Chicago, IL
January 20, 2024; 6:00 p.m., SNY		at No. 9 UConn	L 51–88	10–10 (2–5)	15 – McErlane	9 – Peoples	4 – Allen	Harry A. Gampel Pavilion (10,299); Storrs, CT
January 25, 2024; 7:00 p.m., FloSports		St. John's	L 77–83 ^{2OT}	10–11 (2–6)	37 – Peoples	16 – Peoples	4 – Allen	Wintrust Arena (994); Chicago, IL
January 28, 2024; 1:00 p.m., FS1		Villanova	L 64–95	10–12 (2–7)	12 – Gilbert	5 – Peoples	3 – Gilbert	Wintrust Arena (1,555); Chicago, IL
January 31, 2024; 6:00 p.m., FloSports		at Butler	W 67–57	11–12 (3–7)	24 – Peoples	7 – Tied	3 – Tied	Hinkle Fieldhouse (808); Indianapolis, IN
February 4, 2024; 1:00 p.m., FloSports		at Georgetown	L 42–44	11–13 (3–8)	10 – Peoples	9 – Peoples	3 – Tied	McDonough Gymnasium (738); Washington, D.C.
February 7, 2024; 7:00 p.m., FloSports		Providence	W 84–72	12–13 (4–8)	28 – Peoples	8 – Allen	3 – Peoples	Wintrust Arena (1,125); Chicago, IL
February 10, 2024; 3:00 p.m., FloSports		at No. 21 Creighton	L 59–88	12–14 (4–9)	17 – Peoples	9 – Peoples	3 – Tied	D. J. Sokol Arena (2,102); Omaha, NE
February 13, 2024; 7:00 p.m., FloSports		Marquette	L 58–69	12–15 (4–10)	18 – Allen	12 – Peoples	5 – Gilbert	Wintrust Arena (1,029); Chicago, IL
February 17, 2024; 12:00 p.m., FloSports		at Seton Hall	L 78–91	12–16 (4–11)	25 – Peoples	10 – Peoples	8 – Peoples	Walsh Gymnasium (1,065); South Orange, NJ
February 25, 2024; 5:00 p.m., CBSSN		No. 15 UConn	L 67–104	12–17 (4–12)	24 – Clarke	10 – Gilbert	9 – McErlane	Wintrust Arena (5,477); Chicago, IL
February 28, 2024; 7:00 p.m., FloSports		Butler	L 70–73	12–18 (4–13)	20 – Allen	17 – Gilbert	9 – McErlane	Wintrust Arena (1,154); Chicago, IL
March 3, 2024; 4:00 p.m., FS1		at Villanova	L 66–68	12–19 (4–14)	14 – Tied	12 – Allen	4 – Gilbert	Finneran Pavilion (2,619); Villanova, PA
Big East Women's Tournament
March 8, 2024; 12:30 p.m., FloSports	(10)	vs. (7) Seton Hall; First Round	L 64–71	12–20	18 – Tied	9 – Allen	5 – McErlane	Mohegan Sun Arena; Uncasville, CT
*Non-conference game. ^{#}Rankings from AP Poll. (#) Tournament seedings in parentheses. All times are in Central Time.

== Rankings ==
Ranking movements Legend: — = Not ranked
	Week																				
Poll	Pre	1	2	3	4	5	6	7	8	9	10	11	12	13	14	15	16	17	18	19	Final
AP	—	—*	—	—	—	—	—	—	—												Not released
Coaches	—	—	—	—	—	—	—	—	—												

*The preseason and week 1 polls were the same.

== See also ==
- 2023–24 DePaul Blue Demons men's basketball team
