= 2024 Women's Basketball Invitation Tournament =

Women's college basketball tournament

2024 WBIT
- Season: 2023–24
- Teams: 32
- Finals site: Hinkle Fieldhouse, Indianapolis, Indiana
- Champions: Illinois (1st title)
- Runner-up: Villanova
- Winning coach: Shauna Green (1st title)
- MVP: Makira Cook (Illinois)

The 2024 Women's Basketball Invitation Tournament was a single-elimination tournament of 32 NCAA Division I women's college basketball teams not selected to participate in the 2024 NCAA tournament. The tournament began on March 21 and ended on April 3. The first three rounds were played on campuses, with the semifinal and championship final played at Hinkle Fieldhouse in Indianapolis. It was the inaugural edition of the postseason Women's Basketball Invitation Tournament. Illinois won the tournament, marking the program's first postseason tournament championship.

== Participants ==
Teams and pairings for the 2024 WBIT were released by the WBIT Committee on Sunday, March 17, 2024. Thirty–two teams qualified for the WBIT, including both automatic qualifiers and at-large selections.

=== Automatic qualifiers ===
The regular-season champion of any NCAA Division I conference (as determined by the conference's tiebreaking protocol) not otherwise selected for the NCAA Division I Women's Basketball Championship will, if eligible, secure an automatic qualification invitation to the WBIT. (Note: The regular-season and tournament champion of the Ohio Valley Conference, Southern Indiana, was not eligible for either the NCAA tournament or WBIT due to being in transition from NCAA Division II.) Like the Division I tournament committee, the WBIT Selection Committee will use a variety of resources to determine the participating teams.

Team	Conference	Overall record
Hawaii	Big West	20–10
Lamar	Southland	24–6
Tulsa	American	23–9
High Point	Big South	20–11
Stony Brook	CAA	27–4
Cleveland State	Horizon	29–5
Toledo	MAC	26–5

=== At-large bids ===
The following teams were awarded at-large bids.

Team	Conference	Overall record
George Mason	Atlantic 10	23–7
VCU	Atlantic 10	26–5
Saint Joseph's	Atlantic 10	26–5
Georgia Tech	ACC	17–15
Virginia	ACC	15–15
North Texas	American	23–8
TCU	Big 12	20–11
BYU	Big 12	16–16
St. John's	Big East	17–14
Villanova	Big East	18–12
Georgetown	Big East	22–11
Seton Hall	Big East	17–14
Penn State	Big Ten	19–12
Illinois	Big Ten	14–15
Ball State	MAC	28–5
Belmont	MVC	25–8
Missouri State	MVC	23–9
California	Pac-12	18–14
Washington State	Pac-12	18–14
Washington	Pac-12	16–14
Mississippi State	SEC	21–11
Arkansas	SEC	18–14
Florida	SEC	16–15
James Madison	Sun Belt	23–11
Santa Clara	WCC	24–8

=== Declined bids ===
Miami (FL) declined to play in the 2024 WBIT.

== Bracket ==
First round March 21; Campus sites
1	James Madison	70
Stony Brook	81
4	Illinois	74
Missouri State	69
3	Tulsa	80
Arkansas	62
2	Washington	56
Georgetown	64

Second round March 24; Campus sites
Stony Brook	62
4	Illinois	79
3	Tulsa	73
Georgetown	61

Quarterfinal; March 28; Tulsa, OK
4	Illinois	69
3	Tulsa	61

First round March 21; Campus sites
1	Washington State	66
Lamar	46
4	Santa Clara	60
BYU	59
3	Florida	60
St. John's	79
2	Toledo	76
Cleveland State	68

Second round March 24; Campus sites
1	Washington State	73
4	Santa Clara	47
St John's	71
2	Toledo	72

Quarterfinal; March 28; Pullman, WA
1	Washington State	63
2	Toledo	61

First round March 21; Campus sites
1	Villanova	75
VCU	60
4	Virginia	81
High Point	59
3	Saint Joseph's	54
Seton Hall	47
2	California	65
Hawaii	60

Second round March 24; Campus sites
1	Villanova	73
4	Virginia	55
3	Saint Joseph's	63
2	California	61

Quarterfinal; March 28; Villanova, PA
1	Villanova	67
3	Saint Joseph's	59

First round March 21; Campus sites
1	Penn State	84*
George Mason	80
4	Ball State	59
Belmont	77
3	TCU	67
North Texas	58
2	Mississippi State	84
Georgia Tech	47

Second round March 24; Campus sites
1	Penn State	74
Belmont	66
3	TCU	61
2	Mississippi State	68

Quarterfinal; March 28; State College, PA
1	Penn State	92
2	Mississippi State	87

Semifinals; April 1 Hinkle Fieldhouse
4	Illinois	81
1	Washington State	58
1	Villanova	58
1	Penn State	53

Final; April 3 Hinkle Fieldhouse
4	Illinois	71
1	Villanova	57

* Denotes overtime period

== Media ==
ESPN Inc. had exclusive rights to all WBIT games. It telecast every game across ESPN, ESPN2, ESPNU, ESPN3 and ESPN+. Westwood One had exclusive radio rights to the semifinals and the championship.

== See also ==
- 2024 NCAA Division I women's basketball tournament
- 2024 Women's National Invitation Tournament
