= 2023–24 Villanova Wildcats women's basketball team =

Intercollegiate basketball season

2023–24 Villanova Wildcats women's basketball

WBIT, Runner-up
- Conference: Big East Conference
- Record: 22–13 (11–7 Big East)
- Head coach: Denise Dillon (4th season)
- Associate head coach: Joe Mullaney
- Assistant coaches: Michelle Sword; Tiara Malcom
- Home arena: Finneran Pavilion

2023–24 Big East women's basketball standings
	Conf.				Overall
Team	W		L	PCT	W		L	PCT
No. 3 UConn †	18	–	0	1.000	33	–	6	.846
No. 23 Creighton	15	–	3	.833	26	–	6	.813
St. John's	11	–	7	.611	18	–	15	.545
Villanova	11	–	7	.611	22	–	13	.629
Marquette	11	–	7	.611	23	–	9	.719
Georgetown	9	–	9	.500	23	–	12	.657
Seton Hall	8	–	10	.444	17	–	15	.531
Butler	6	–	12	.333	15	–	17	.469
Providence	6	–	12	.333	13	–	21	.382
DePaul	4	–	14	.222	12	–	20	.375
Xavier	0	–	18	.000	1	–	27	.036
† 2024 Big East tournament winner Rankings from AP poll

The 2023–24 Villanova Wildcats women's basketball team represented Villanova University in the 2023–24 NCAA Division I women's basketball season. The Wildcats, led by 4th-year head coach Denise Dillon, played their home games at the Finneran Pavilion in Villanova, Pennsylvania and were members of the Big East Conference.

== Previous season ==
The Wildcats finished the 2022–23 season at 30–7 and 17–3 in Big East play, to finish in second place. They advanced to the championship game of the Big East women's tournament, where they lost to UConn. They received an at-large bid to the NCAA women's tournament as a 4th seed in Greensboro region 2, where they defeated Cleveland State in the first round and Florida Gulf Coast to advance to the Sweet Sixteen for the first time since 2003, where they lost to Miami to end their season.

== Offseason ==
=== Departures ===
Name	Number	Pos.	Height	Year	Hometown	Reason for departure
Anahi-Lee Cauley	5	G	6' 0"	Sophomore	Windsor, CT	Transferred to William & Mary
Brooke Mullin	15	G	5' 11"	Senior	Langhorne, PA	Graduate transferred to Drexel
Maddy Siegrist	20	F	6' 1"	Senior	Poughkeepsie, NY	Graduated/2023 WNBA draft; selected 3rd overall by Dallas Wings

=== Incoming transfers ===
Name	Number	Pos.	Height	Year	Hometown	Previous school
Denae Carter	25	F	6' 0"	Junior	Philadelphia, PA	Mississippi State

==== Recruiting ====
There was no recruiting class of 2023.

==== Recruiting class of 2024 ====
College recruiting (2024)
Name	Hometown	School	Height	Weight	Commit date
Jasmine Bascoe; PG	Milton, ON	King's Christian Collegiate	5 ft 7 in (1.70 m)	N/A	
Jasmine Bascoe; PG	Recruit ratings: ESPN: (91)				
Overall recruit ranking:
Note: In many cases, Scout, Rivals, 247Sports, On3, and ESPN may conflict in their listings of height and weight.; In these cases, the average was taken. ESPN grades are on a 100-point scale.; Sources: "2024 Player Commits". ESPN. Archived from the original on November 30, 2023.

== Roster ==
2023–24 Villanova Wildcats women's basketball team
Players
Coaches

Pos.	#	Name	Height	Year	Previous school	Hometown
G	1	Zanai Jones	5 ft 6 in (1.68 m)	Jr	Hudson Catholic	Jersey City, NJ
G	2	Abby Jegede	5 ft 10 in (1.78 m)	RS Fr	King's Christian Collegiate	Toronto, ON
G	3	Lucy Olsen	5 ft 9 in (1.75 m)	Jr	Spring-Ford	Royersford, PA
G	4	Kaitlyn Orihel	5 ft 10 in (1.78 m)	Jr	Archbishop Wood	Newtown, PA
F	10	Christina Dalce	6 ft 2 in (1.88 m)	Jr	Rutgers Prep	Edison, NJ
F	13	Brynn McCurry	6 ft 1 in (1.85 m)	Fr	Sparta	Sparta, NJ
F	14	Megan Olbrys	6 ft 1 in (1.85 m)	So	Norwood	Norwood, MA
F/C	21	Kylie Swider	6 ft 4 in (1.93 m)	Sr	Tabor	Portsmouth, RI
G	23	Maddie Burke	6 ft 0 in (1.83 m)	Sr	Central Bucks West	Doylestown, PA
F	25	Denae Carter	6 ft 0 in (1.83 m)	Jr	St. Basil Academy; Mississippi State	Philadelphia, PA
G	32	Bella Runyan	5 ft 11 in (1.8 m)	Sr	Moorestown Friends	Moorestown, NJ
G	34	Maddie Webber	5 ft 11 in (1.8 m)	Fr	South Fayette	Sparta, NJ
F	43	Annie Welde	6 ft 0 in (1.83 m)	So	Cardinal O'Hara	Bridgeville, PA
G	44	Maggie Grant	6 ft 0 in (1.83 m)	So	Archbishop John Carroll	Downingtown, PA

Head coach

- Denise Dillon (Villanova)

Assistant coach(es)

- Joe Mullaney (Providence)
- Michelle Sword (Saint Joseph's)
- Mary Wooley (USC Aiken)

Legend

- (C) Team captain
- (S) Suspended
- (I) Ineligible
- (W) Walk-on
- Injured
- Current redshirt

Roster
Last update: September 29, 2024

== Schedule and results ==
Date time, TV	Rank^{#}	Opponent^{#}	Result	Record	High points	High rebounds	High assists	Site (attendance) city, state
Exhibition
November 1, 2023*; 7:00 p.m.		Jefferson	W 69–42		–	–	–	Finneran Pavilion; Villanova, PA
Regular season
November 10, 2023*; 9:00 p.m., ESPN+		at Portland	W 64–42	1–0	20 – Olsen	8 – Dalce	5 – Olsen	Chiles Center (733); Portland, OR
November 12, 2023*; 4:00 p.m., P12N		at Oregon State	L 56–63	1–1	24 – Olsen	9 – Runyan	4 – Runyan	Gill Coliseum (3,775); Corvallis, OR
November 19, 2023*; 2:00 p.m., FloSports		Temple	W 90–62	2–1	40 – Olsen	18 – Dalce	4 – Runyan	Finneran Pavilion (2,185); Villanova, PA
November 21, 2023*; 7:00 p.m., FloSports		Holy Cross	W 63–53	3–1	14 – Olsen	13 – Runyan	4 – Runyan	Finneran Pavilion (1,345); Villanova, PA
November 26, 2023*; 12:00 p.m., ACCN		at Wake Forest	W 74–65	4–1	21 – Olsen	12 – Dalce	5 – tied	LJVM Coliseum (760); Winston-Salem, NC
November 30, 2023*; 7:00 p.m., FloSports		Richmond	W 67–57	5–1	30 – Olsen	15 – Dalce	5 – Runyan	Finneran Pavilion (2,241); Villanova, PA
December 3, 2023*; 2:00 p.m., ESPN+		at Columbia	L 75–77	5–2	33 – Olsen	13 – Dalce	8 – Runyan	Levien Gymnasium (1,024); New York, NY
December 5, 2023*; 7:00 p.m., FloSports		Penn	W 68–62	6–2	18 – Dalce	17 – Dalce	3 – Olsen	Finneran Pavilion (1,141); Villanova, PA
December 9, 2023*; 7:00 p.m., ESPN+		at Saint Joseph's; Holy War	L 67–73	6–3	32 – Olsen	11 – Dalce	2 – tied	Hagan Arena (863); Philadelphia, PA
December 11, 2023*; 7:00 p.m., FloSports		Princeton	L 58–61	6–4	21 – Olsen	12 – Dalce	4 – Olsen	Finneran Pavilion (1,119); Villanova, PA
December 16, 2023; 6:00 p.m., BEDN		at St. John's	L 46–51	6–5 (0–1)	16 – Runyan	5 – Olsen	6 – McCurry	Madison Square Garden (12,720); New York, NY
December 21, 2023*; 12:00 p.m., ESPN+		at La Salle	W 74–60	7–5	23 – Olsen	11 – Dalce	7 – Runyan	Tom Gola Arena (612); Philadelphia, PA
December 30, 2023; 2:00 p.m., BEDN		Xavier	W 86–45	8–5 (1–1)	31 – Olsen	9 – Olsen	4 – tied	Finneran Pavilion (2,341); Villanova, PA
January 3, 2024; 7:00 p.m., BEDN		at Seton Hall	W 50–45	9–5 (2–1)	13 – Orihel	12 – Dalce	5 – Olsen	Walsh Gymnasium (845); South Orange, NJ
January 10, 2024; 11:30 a.m., BEDN		Georgetown	W 53–51 ^{OT}	10–5 (3–1)	28 – Olsen	9 – Olsen	2 – tied	Finneran Pavilion (1,059); Villanova, PA
January 13, 2024; 7:30 p.m., BEDN		at Butler	W 65–54	11–5 (4–1)	18 – Webber	13 – Dalce	6 – Olsen	Hinkle Fieldhouse (777); Indianapolis, IN
January 17, 2024; 7:00 p.m., BEDN		No. 22 Marquette	W 66–63	12–5 (5–1)	37 – Olsen	14 – Dalce	5 – Olsen	Finneran Pavilion (1,643); Villanova, PA
January 21, 2024; 12:00 p.m., CBSSN		No. 21 Creighton	L 49–63	12–6 (5–2)	29 – Olsen	9 – Dalce	3 – Olsen	Finneran Pavilion (2,651); Villanova, PA
January 24, 2024; 7:00 p.m., BEDN		at Providence	L 76–82 ^{OT}	12–7 (5–3)	20 – Webber	14 – Dalce	5 – tied	Alumni Hall (827); Providence, RI
January 28, 2024; 2:00 p.m., FS1		at DePaul	W 95–64	13–7 (6–3)	24 – Olsen	6 – tied	9 – Olsen	Wintrust Arena (1,555); Chicago, IL
January 31, 2024; 6:30 p.m., SNY		No. 11 UConn	L 60–81	13–8 (6–4)	15 – Olsen	4 – tied	4 – tied	Finneran Pavilion (4,109); Villanova, PA
February 3, 2024; 2:00 p.m., BEDN		Seton Hall	W 69–41	14–8 (7–4)	21 – Olsen	9 – Dalce	10 – Olsen	Finneran Pavilion (2,881); Villanova, PA
February 10, 2024; 3:00 p.m., FOX		at Marquette	W 55–52	15–8 (8–4)	19 – Olsen	10 – Dalce	3 – Olsen	Al McGuire Center (1,639); Milwaukee, WI
February 13, 2024; 11:00 a.m., BEDN		at Georgetown	W 62–47	16–8 (9–4)	33 – Olsen	8 – Olsen	3 – tied	McDonough Gymnasium (632); Washington, D.C.
February 17, 2024; 4:00 p.m., BEDN		Butler	L 52–55	16–9 (9–5)	21 – Olsen	14 – Dalce	6 – Runyan	Finneran Pavilion (3,059); Villanova, PA
February 21, 2024; 7:00 p.m., BEDN		Providence	W 68–58	17–9 (10–5)	30 – Olsen	8 – Dalce	7 – Runyan	Finneran Pavilion (1,109); Villanova, PA
February 24, 2024; 4:00 p.m., FOX		at No. 21 Creighton	L 69–79	17–10 (10–6)	26 – Olsen	13 – Dalce	5 – Olsen	D. J. Sokol Arena (2,188); Omaha, NE
February 28, 2024; 7:00 p.m., SNY		at No. 10 UConn	L 46–67	17–11 (10–7)	15 – Orihel	6 – Olsen	3 – tied	Harry A. Gampel Pavilion (10,299); Storrs, CT
March 3, 2024; 5:00 p.m., FS1		DePaul	W 68–66	18–11 (11–7)	31 – Olsen	10 – Olsen	5 – Runyan	Finneran Pavilion (2,619); Villanova, PA
Big East women's tournament
March 9, 2024; 2:30 p.m., FS2	(4)	vs. (5) Marquette; Quarterfinals	L 48–50	18–12	22 – Olsen	11 – Dalce	2 – tied	Mohegan Sun Arena; Uncasville, CT
WBIT
March 21, 2024*; 7:00 p.m., ESPN+	(1)	VCU; First round	W 75–60	19–12	29 – Olsen	6 – Burke	7 – Runyan	Finneran Pavilion (851); Villanova, PA
March 24, 2024*; 2:00 p.m., ESPN+	(1)	(4) Virginia; Second round	W 73–55	20–12	30 – Olsen	15 – Dalce	6 – Runyan	Finneran Pavilion (1,315); Villanova, PA
March 28, 2024*; 7:00 p.m., ESPN+	(1)	(3) Saint Joseph's; Quarterfinals/Holy War	W 67–59	21–12	16 – tied	10 – Dalce	6 – McCurry	Finneran Pavilion (2,415); Villanova, PA
April 1, 2024*; 2:30 p.m., ESPNU	(1)	vs. (1) Penn State; Semifinals	W 58–53	22–12	21 – Olsen	7 – Dalce	6 – Olsen	Hinkle Fieldhouse (1,748); Indianapolis, IN
April 3, 2024*; 7:00 p.m., ESPN2	(1)	vs. (4) Illinois; Finals	L 57–71	22–13	22 – Olsen	6 – Olsen	5 – Olsen	Hinkle Fieldhouse; Indianapolis, IN
*Non-conference game. ^{#}Rankings from AP poll. (#) Tournament seedings in parentheses. All times are in Eastern.

== Rankings ==
Ranking movements Legend: ██ Increase in ranking ██ Decrease in ranking — = Not ranked RV = Received votes
	Week																				
Poll	Pre	1	2	3	4	5	6	7	8	9	10	11	12	13	14	15	16	17	18	19	Final
AP	RV	RV*	—	—	—																Not released
Coaches	RV	RV*	—	—	—																

*The pre-season and week 1 polls were the same.

== See also ==
- 2023–24 Villanova Wildcats men's basketball team
