= Cornell Big Red women's basketball =

2026–27 Cornell Big Red women's basketball team
- University: Cornell University
- First season: 1971; 55 years ago
- Head coach: Emily Garner (3rd season)
- Location: Ithaca, New York
- Arena: Newman Arena (capacity: 4,473)
- Conference: Ivy League
- Nickname: Big Red
- Colors: Carnelian red and white

NCAA Division I tournament appearances
- 2008

Conference regular-season champions
- 2008

Uniforms
Home	Away

The Cornell Big Red women's basketball team is the intercollegiate women's basketball program representing Cornell University. The school competes in the Ivy League in Division I of the National Collegiate Athletic Association (NCAA). The Big Red play home basketball games at the Newman Arena in Ithaca, New York on the university campus.

== History ==
The Big Red have played at a varsity level since 1971, though Cornell had women play in class competitions before then. They started playing in the Ivy League in 1974. The Big Red played in only 7 games for the 1976–77 season due to being snowed in for days before the opener and a bus accident three weeks later that injured many of the players, which cancelled the season. Cornell has just one conference title (2008), winning a playoff with Dartmouth 64–47 to break the three way tie (Harvard being the other time) and winning the bid to the NCAA Tournament.

Year	Record	Conference Record	Coach
1971–72	6–7	n/a	Cathy Koch
1972–73	7–3	n/a	Barbara Koch
1973–74	4–5	n/a	Barbara Koch
1974–75	7–7	0–4	Barbara Koch
1975–76	4–9	1–2	Barbara Koch
1976–77	1–7	1–2	Donna Turnbaugh
1977–78	3–8	n/a	Donna Turnbaugh
1978–79	10–10	2–3	Donna Turnbaugh
1979–80	8–17	2–8	Donna Turnbaugh
1980–81	3–19	1–8	Donna Turnbaugh
1981–82	6–17	2–7	Linda Lerch
1982–83	11–15	3–9 (7th)	Linda Lerch
1983–84	13–13	5–7 (T-5th)	Linda Lerch
1984–85	9–17	3–9 (6th)	Linda Lerch
1985–86	9–16	3–9 (T-6th)	Linda Lerch
1986–87	8–18	3–11 (7th)	Linda Lerch
1987–88	8–16	0–14 (8th)	Linda Lerch
1988–89	6–20	2–12 (8th)	Kim Jordan
1989–90	7–19	2–12 (8th)	Kim Jordan
1990–91	5–21	3–11 (7th)	Kim Jordan
1991–92	7–19	3–11 (7th)	Kim Jordan
1992–93	10–16	4–10 (7th)	Kim Jordan
1993–94	8–18	5–9 (6th)	Kim Jordan
1994–95	9–17	5–9 (T-6th)	Kim Jordan
1995–96	12–14	7–7 (T-5th)	Marnie Dacko
1996–97	12–14	7–7 (4th)	Marnie Dacko
1997–98	5–21	2–12 (7th)	Marnie Dacko
1998–99	11–15	5–9 (T-6th)	Marnie Dacko
1999-00	11–15	3–11 (8th)	Marnie Dacko
2000–01	15–12	8–6 (T-3rd)	Marnie Dacko
2001–02	14–13	8–6 (T-2nd)	Marnie Dacko
2002–03	10–17	4–10 (T-5th)	Dayna Smith
2003–04	9–18	4–10 (T-7th)	Dayna Smith
2004–05	3–24	1–13 (8th)	Dayna Smith
2005–06	8–19	5–9 (5th)	Dayna Smith
2006–07	12–15	8–6 (3rd)	Dayna Smith
2007–08	20–9	11–3 (T-1st)	Dayna Smith
2008–09	10–16	6–8 (T-4th)	Dayna Smith
2009–10	7–20	2–12 (7th)	Dayna Smith
2010–11	6–22	3–11 (T-7th)	Dayna Smith
2011–12	12–16	6–8 (T-5th)	Dayna Smith
2012–13	13–15	5–9 (5th)	Dayna Smith
2013–14	14–14	6–8 (5th)	Dayna Smith
2014–15	15–13	6–8 (5th)	Dayna Smith
2015–16	14–14	6–8 (5th)	Dayna Smith
2016–17	16–11	7–7	Dayna Smith
2017-18	7-20	3-10	Dayna Smith
2018-19	12-14	6-8	Dayna Smith

== Postseason appearances ==
The Big Red have made the NCAA Division I women's basketball tournament once. They have a record of 0–1.

Year	Seed	Round	Opponent	Result
2008	16	First round	(1) Connecticut	L 89–47
