= Ashlynn Shade =

American basketball player

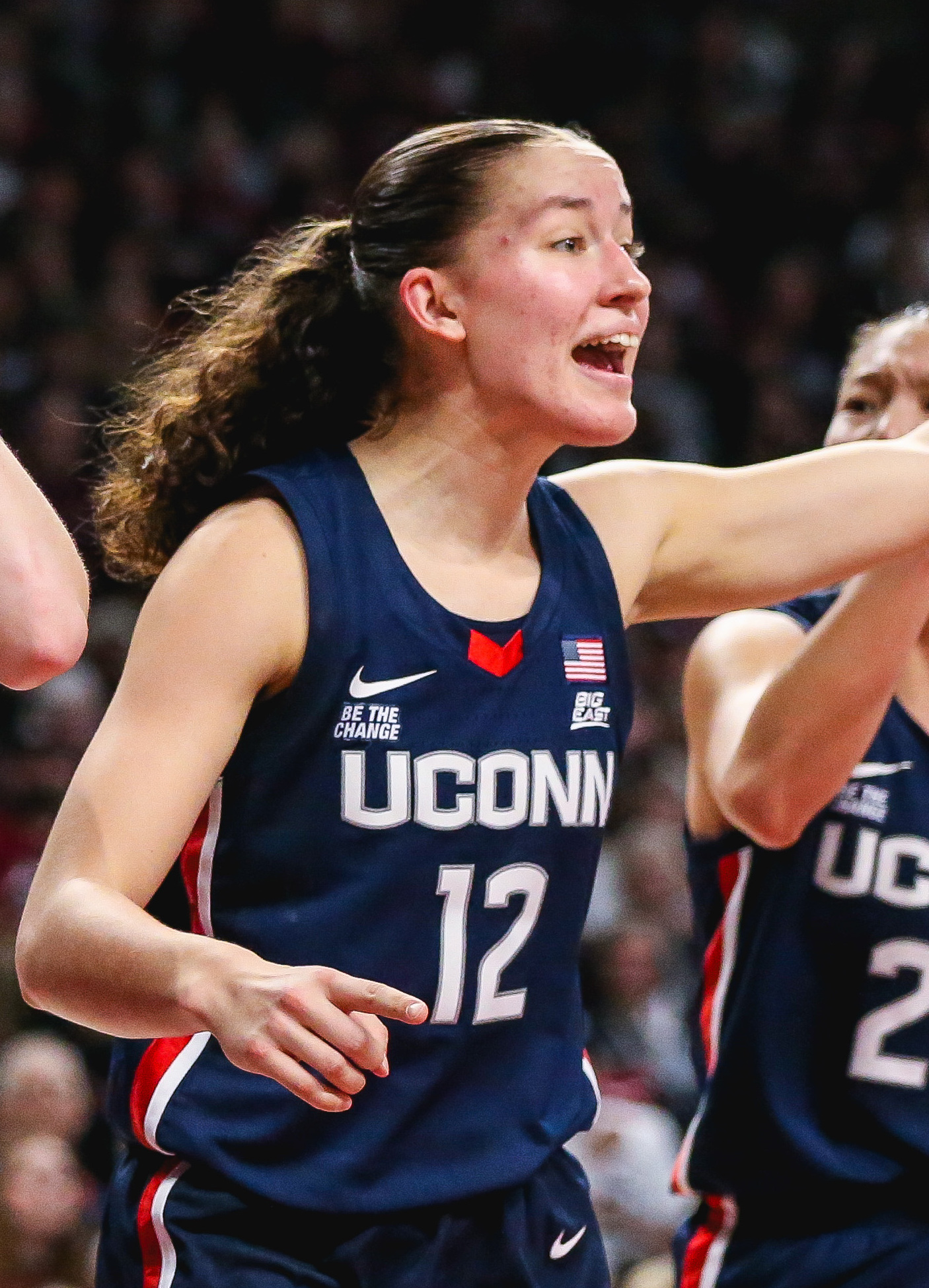
- Shade with UConn in 2025

No. 12 – UConn Huskies
- Position: Guard
- League: Big East Conference

Personal information
- Born: July 13, 2004 (age 22)
- Listed height: 5 ft 10 in (1.78 m)

Career information
- High school: Noblesville (Noblesville, Indiana); La Lumiere (La Porte, Indiana)
- College: UConn (2023–present)

Career highlights
- NCAA champion (2025); Big East Sixth Player of the Year (2025); Big East Freshman of the Year (2024); Big East All-Freshman Team (2024); McDonald's All-American (2023); Nike Hoop Summit (2023)

Ashlynn Shade is an American college basketball player for the UConn Huskies of the Big East Conference.

== High school career ==
Shade played basketball for Noblesville High School in Noblesville, Indiana in her first three years. As a junior, she led her team to the Class 4A state championship and was named Indiana Gatorade Player of the Year. For her senior season, Shade transferred to La Lumiere School in La Porte, Indiana. She was selected to play in the McDonald's All-American Game. Rated a five-star recruit, she committed to play college basketball for UConn over offers from Indiana, Notre Dame, Louisville, Stanford, and Tennessee.

== College career ==
Shade entered the starting lineup for UConn in her freshman season after injuries to guards Azzi Fudd and Caroline Ducharme. She averaged 11 points per game and earned Big East Freshman of the Year honors, helping her team reach the Final Four of the 2024 NCAA tournament.

== Career statistics ==
Legend
GP	Games played	GS	Games started	MPG	Minutes per game	RPG	Rebounds per game
APG	Assists per game	SPG	Steals per game	BPG	Blocks per game	PPG	Points per game
TO	Turnovers per game	FG%	Field-goal percentage	3P%	3-point field-goal percentage	FT%	Free-throw percentage
**Bold**	Career best	°	League leader

*	Denotes seasons in which Shade won an NCAA Championship

=== College ===
Year	Team	GP	GS	MPG	FG%	3P%	FT%	RPG	APG	SPG	BPG	TO	PPG
2023–24	UConn	38	**33**	**31.4**	**48.1**	35.6	**91.3**	**3.5**	**1.4**	1.0	0.1	1.0	**11.0**
2024–25*	UConn	**40**	12	22.3	48.0	**41.1**	71.4	2.7	1.3	**1.4**	**0.2**	**0.6**	7.7
Career		78	45	26.7	48.1	37.9	81.8	3.1	1.4	1.2	0.1	0.8	9.3
Statistics retrieved from Sports-Reference.
