= 2024 NCAA Women's Basketball All-Americans =

Honorary sports team

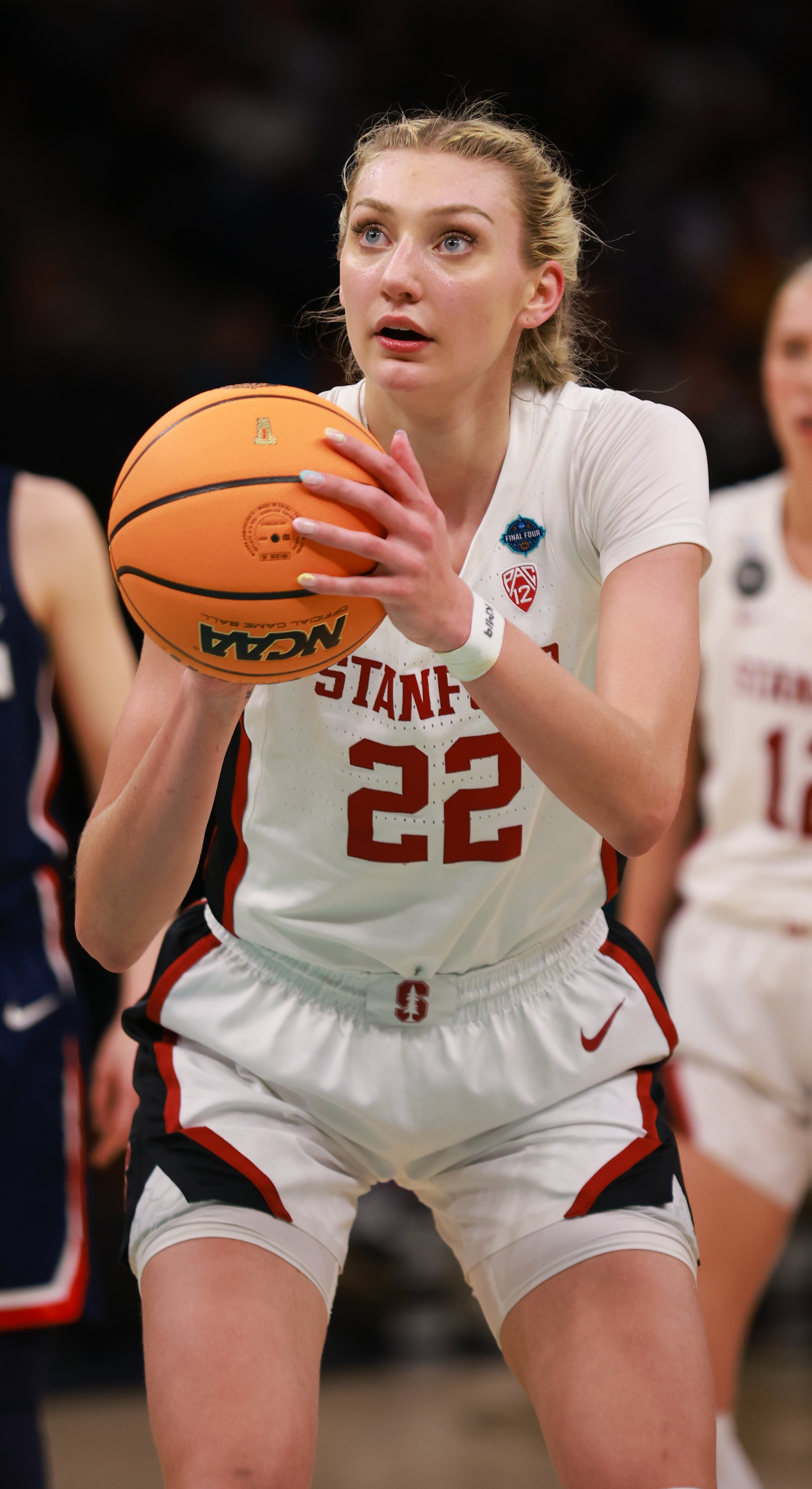
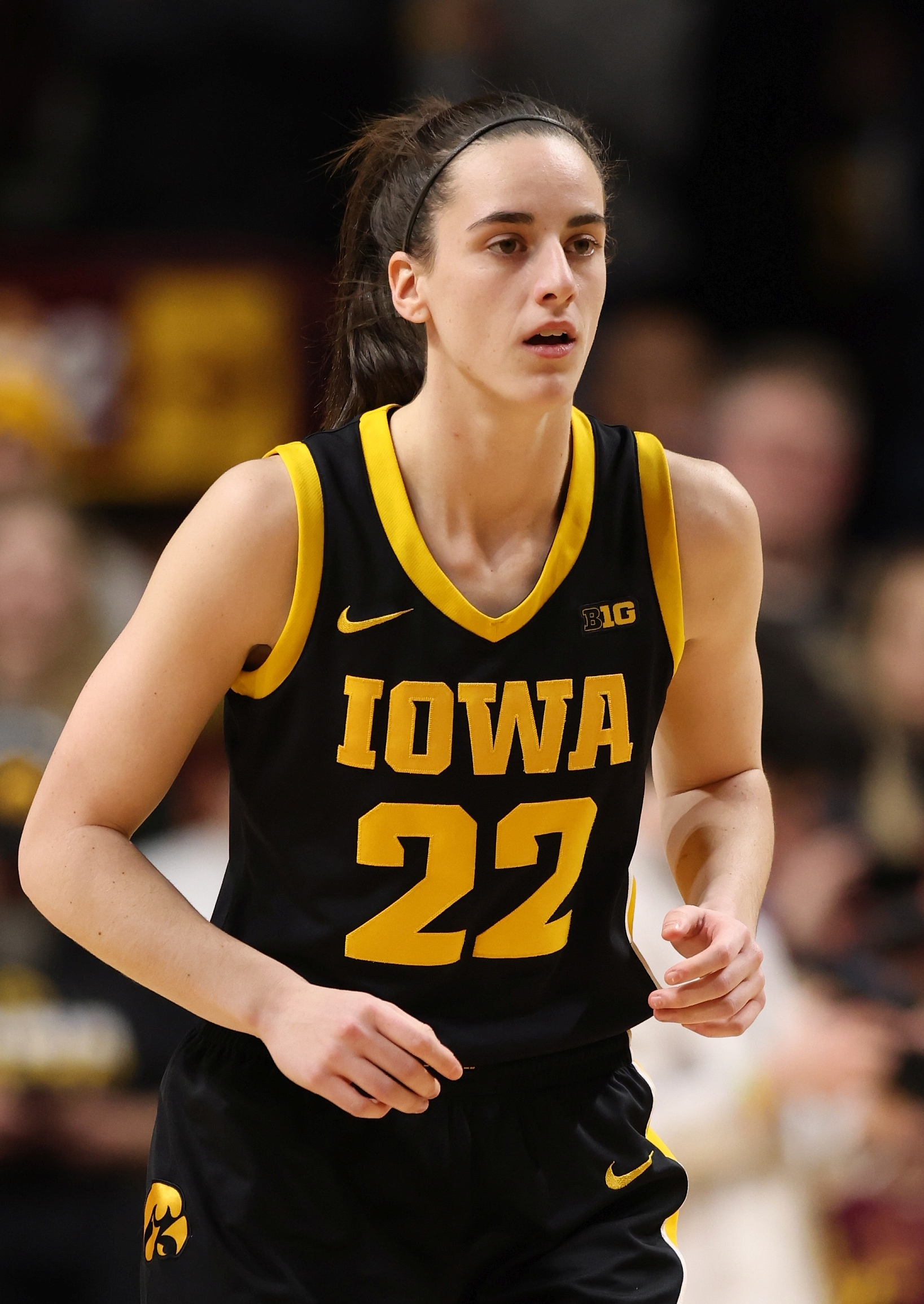
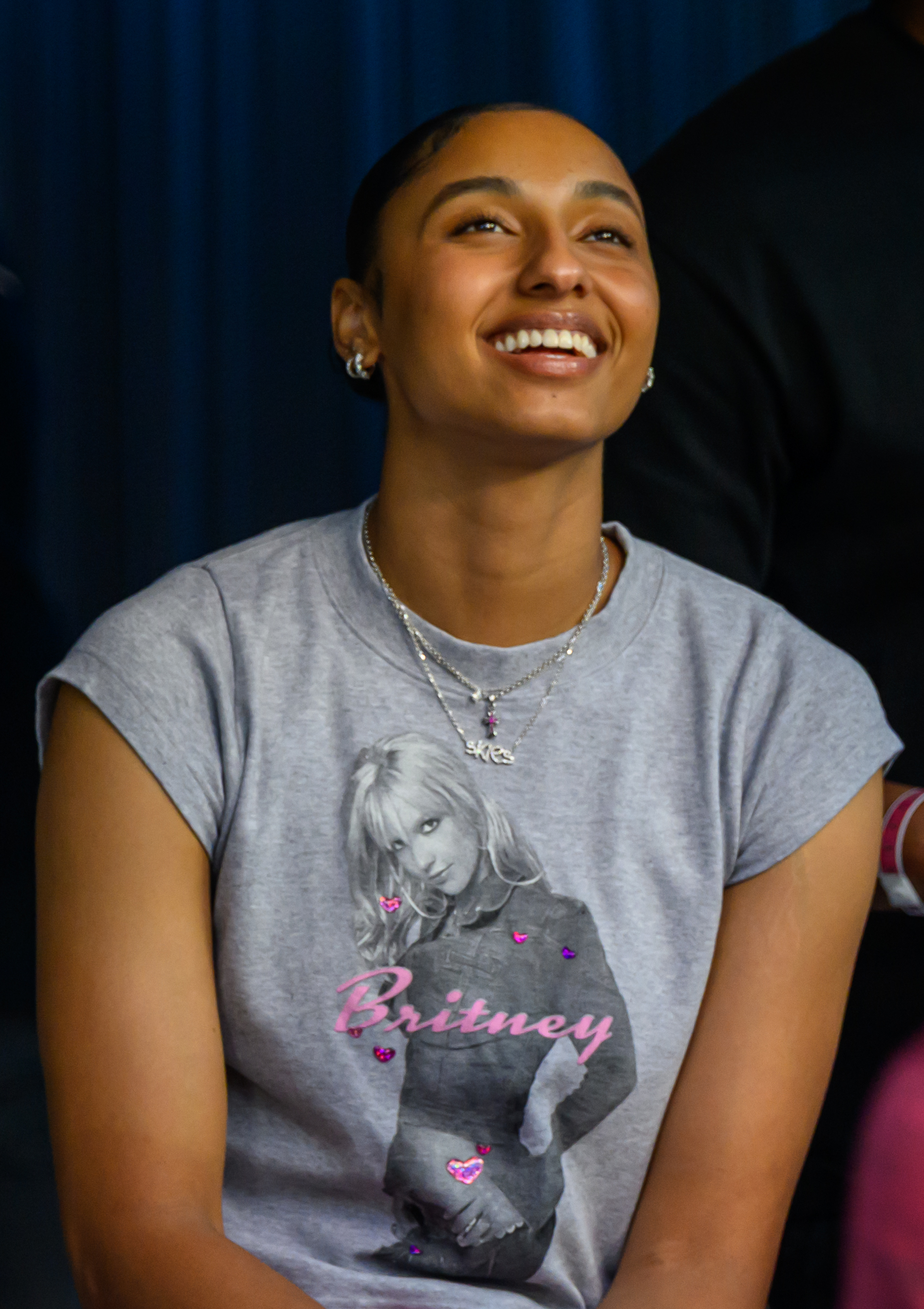
- Members of the 2024 All-America first team (AP, TSN, USBWA). Clockwise from upper left: Brink, Clark, and Watkins.
- Awarded for: 2023–24 NCAA Division I women's basketball season

An All-American team is an honorary sports team composed of the best amateur players of a specific season for each team position—which in turn are given the honorific "All-America" and typically referred to as "All-American athletes", or simply "All-Americans". Although the honorees generally do not compete as a unit, the term is used in U.S. team sports to refer to players who national media members select. Walter Camp selected the first All-America team in the early days of American football in 1889. The 2024 NCAA Women's Basketball All-Americans are honorary lists that include All-American selections from the Associated Press (AP), the United States Basketball Writers Association (USBWA), The Sporting News (TSN), and the Women's Basketball Coaches Association (WBCA) for the 2023–24 NCAA Division I women's basketball season. The AP, TSN and USBWA choose three teams, while WBCA lists ten honorees.

A consensus All-America team in women's basketball has never been organized. This differs from the practice in men's basketball, in which the NCAA uses a combination of selections by AP, USBWA, the National Association of Basketball Coaches (NABC), and Sporting News to determine a consensus All-America team. The selection of a consensus All-America men's basketball team is possible because all four organizations select at least a first and second team, with only the USBWA not selecting a third team.

Before the 2017–18 season, a consensus women's All-America team couldn't be determined because the AP had been the only body that divided its women's selections into separate teams. The USBWA first named different teams in 2017–18. The women's counterpart to the NABC, the Women's Basketball Coaches Association (WBCA), continues the USBWA's former practice of selecting a single 10-member (plus ties) team. Before the 2023–24 season, Sporting News did not select an All-America team in women's basketball.

== By selector ==
=== Associated Press (AP) ===
Announced on March 20, 2024. The teams are selected by the same 28-member media panel that votes on the AP poll during the season. Of note:

- Caitlin Clark became the eleventh player selected as a three-time first-team All-American.
- Clark was a unanimous first-team selection.

First team		Second team		Third team	
Player	School	Player	School	Player	School
Cameron Brink	Stanford	Madison Booker	Texas	Georgia Amoore	Virginia Tech
Paige Bueckers	UConn	Kamilla Cardoso	South Carolina	Raegan Beers	Oregon State
Caitlin Clark	Iowa	Elizabeth Kitley	Virginia Tech	Dyaisha Fair	Syracuse
Hannah Hidalgo	Notre Dame	Angel Reese	LSU	Mackenzie Holmes	Indiana
JuJu Watkins	USC	Jacy Sheldon	Ohio State	Alissa Pili	Utah

==== AP Honorable Mention ====
Honorable mention selections are those who did not make one of the first three teams, but received at least one vote from the media panel.

- Lauren Betts, UCLA
- Audi Crooks, Iowa State
- Aaliyah Edwards, UConn
- Yvonne Ejim, Gonzaga
- Lauren Gustin, BYU
- McKenna Hofschild, Colorado State
- Abbey Hsu, Columbia
- Kiki Iriafen, Stanford
- Rickea Jackson, Tennessee
- Ta'Niya Latson, Florida State
- Ayoka Lee, Kansas State
- Cotie McMahon, Ohio State
- Aneesah Morrow, LSU
- Nika Mühl, UConn
- Lucy Olsen, Villanova
- Charisma Osborne, UCLA
- Te-Hina Paopao, South Carolina
- JJ Quinerly, West Virginia
- Saniya Rivers, North Carolina State
- Kiki Rice, UCLA
- Jaylyn Sherrod, Colorado
- Skylar Vann, Oklahoma

=== United States Basketball Writers Association (USBWA) ===
The USBWA announced its 15-member team, divided into first, second, and third teams, plus honorable mention selections, on March 19, 2024. Vote totals were not released.

First team		Second team		Third team	
Player	School	Player	School	Player	School
Cameron Brink	Stanford	Aaliyah Edwards	UConn	Georgia Amoore	Virginia Tech
Paige Bueckers	UConn	Hannah Hidalgo	Notre Dame	Madison Booker	Texas
Kamilla Cardoso	South Carolina	Mackenzie Holmes	Indiana	Dyaisha Fair	Syracuse
Caitlin Clark	Iowa	Elizabeth Kitley	Virginia Tech	Alissa Pili	Utah
Angel Reese	LSU	Te-Hina Paopao	South Carolina	Jacy Sheldon	Ohio State
JuJu Watkins	USC				

==== USBWA Honorable Mention ====
- Raegan Beers, Oregon State
- Lauren Betts, UCLA
- Rickea Jackson, Tennessee
- Cotie McMahon, Ohio State
- Aneesah Morrow, LSU

=== The Sporting News (TSN) ===
The Sporting News announced its 15-member team, divided into first, second and third teams, on March 19, 2024.

First team		Second team		Third team	
Player	School	Player	School	Player	School
Cameron Brink	Stanford	Raegan Beers	Oregon State	Madison Booker	Texas
Caitlin Clark	Iowa	Paige Bueckers	UConn	Aaliyah Edwards	UConn
Hannah Hidalgo	Notre Dame	Kamilla Cardoso	South Carolina	Dyaisha Fair	Syracuse
Liz Kitley	Virginia Tech	Angel Reese	LSU	Ayoka Lee	Kansas State
JuJu Watkins	USC	Jacy Sheldon	Ohio State	Alissa Pili	Utah

=== Women's Basketball Coaches Association (WBCA) ===
Announced on April 4, 2024.

Player	School
Madison Booker	Texas
Cameron Brink	Stanford
Paige Bueckers	UConn
Kamilla Cardoso	South Carolina
Caitlin Clark	Iowa
Aaliyah Edwards	UConn
Hannah Hidalgo	Notre Dame
Elizabeth Kitley	Virginia Tech
Angel Reese	LSU
JuJu Watkins	USC

== Academic All-Americans ==
College Sports Communicators (known before the 2022–23 season as the College Sports Information Directors of America) will announce its 2024 Academic All-America team on April 17, 2024. The Division I Academic All-American of the Year is indicated in bold.

First Team
Player	School	Class	GPA and major
Georgia Amoore	Virginia Tech	Senior	3.56, Sociology
Paige Bueckers	UConn	Junior	3.50, Human Development & Family Sciences
**Caitlin Clark**	Iowa	Senior	3.64, Marketing
Mackenzie Holmes	Indiana	Graduate	3.62/3.64, Human Development & Family Studies (U)
Elizabeth Kitley	Virginia Tech	Graduate	3.90/4.0, Curriculum & Instruction
Ayoka Lee	Kansas State	Senior	3.90/3.85, Masters in Couple & Family Counseling

Second Team
Player	School	Class	GPA and major
Raegan Beers	Oregon State	Sophomore	3.55, Education
Kaitlyn Chen	Princeton	Senior	3.54, Medical Anthropology
Yvonne Ejim	Gonzaga	Senior	3.55, Human Physiology
Hannah Jump	Stanford	Graduate	3.76, Psychology

Third Team
Player	School	Class	GPA and major
Frida Formann	Colorado	Senior	4.0, Environmental Studies
Shay Holle	Texas	Senior	3.54/4.0, Finance
Morgan Maly	Creighton	Senior	3.95, Exercise Science
Irene Murua	Detroit Mercy	Senior	4.0, Mathematics
Rachael Rose	Wofford	Junior	3.86, Psychology
Amy Velasco	Bowling Green	Junior	4.0, Physical Education and Health Education
