= 2023–24 Xavier Musketeers women's basketball team =

American college basketball season

2023–24 Xavier Musketeers women's basketball
- Conference: Big East Conference
- Record: 1–27 (0–18 Big East)
- Head coach: Billi Chambers (1st season)
- Associate head coach: Ashlee Kelly
- Assistant coaches: Brianna Sanders; Myia Johnson
- Home arena: Cintas Center

2023–24 Big East women's basketball standings
	Conf.				Overall
Team	W		L	PCT	W		L	PCT
No. 3 UConn †	18	–	0	1.000	33	–	6	.846
No. 23 Creighton	15	–	3	.833	26	–	6	.813
St. John's	11	–	7	.611	18	–	15	.545
Villanova	11	–	7	.611	22	–	13	.629
Marquette	11	–	7	.611	23	–	9	.719
Georgetown	9	–	9	.500	23	–	12	.657
Seton Hall	8	–	10	.444	17	–	15	.531
Butler	6	–	12	.333	15	–	17	.469
Providence	6	–	12	.333	13	–	21	.382
DePaul	4	–	14	.222	12	–	20	.375
Xavier	0	–	18	.000	1	–	27	.036
† 2024 Big East tournament winner Rankings from AP poll

The 2023–24 Xavier Musketeers women's basketball team represented Xavier University during the 2023–24 NCAA Division I women's basketball season. The Musketeers, led by first-year head coach Billi Chambers, played their home games at the Cintas Center in Cincinnati, Ohio as a member of the Big East Conference.

== Previous season ==
The Musketeers finished the 2022–23 season 7–23, 0–20 in A–10 play to finish in last place. As the #11 seed in the Big East tournament, they were defeated by #6 seed Seton Hall in the first round.

On March 6, 2023, it was announced that the school and head coach Melanie Moore mutually agreed to part ways, ending her four-year tenure with the team. On April 5, Iona head coach Billi Chambers was announced as Xavier's next head coach.

== Roster ==
2023–24 Xavier Musketeers women's basketball team
Players
Coaches

Pos.	#	Name	Height	Year	Previous school	Hometown
G	0	Shelby Calhoun	5 ft 11 in (1.8 m)	Sr	Virginia Tech	Louisville, Kentucky
F	1	Loren Christie	6 ft 3 in (1.91 m)	RS Sr	San Francisco	London, England
G	2	Aizhanique Mayo	5 ft 9 in (1.75 m)	RS Fr	Notre Dame High School	Bridgeport, Connecticut
G	3	Taylor Smith	5 ft 8 in (1.73 m)	GS	Ole Miss	Marietta, Georgia
F	4	Nila Blackford	6 ft 2 in (1.88 m)	GS	Kent State	Louisville, Kentucky
G	5	Tae'lor Purvis	5 ft 7 in (1.7 m)	Sr	Houston	Houston, Texas
G	10	Júlia Garcia Roig	5 ft 7 in (1.7 m)	Fr	Ipsi	Barcelona, Spain
G	11	Aby Shubert	5 ft 8 in (1.73 m)	Fr	Kasson-Mantorville High School	Kasson, Minnesota
G	12	Kaysia Woods	6 ft 0 in (1.83 m)	Jr	Lincoln High School	Lincoln, Nebraska
C	13	Lika Kvirkvelia	6 ft 4 in (1.93 m)	Fr	Tbilisi Public School	Kobuleti, Georgia
G	15	Mackayla Scarlett	5 ft 10 in (1.78 m)	Sr	St. Francis Prep	Bronx, New York
F	22	Bella Ward	5 ft 11 in (1.8 m)	So	Gahanna Lincoln High School	Blacklick, Ohio
G/F	23	Aanaya Harris	5 ft 11 in (1.8 m)	Jr	Burke High School	Omaha, Nebraska
G/F	24	Delaney Hogan	6 ft 0 in (1.83 m)	Sr	Bishop Dwenger High School	Fort Wayne, Indiana
G	44	Daniela López	5 ft 8 in (1.73 m)	Fr	UE Mataró	Barcelona, Spain

Head coach

- Billi Chambers (Hofstra)

Assistant coach(es)

- Ashlee Kelly (Quinnipiac)
- Brianna Sanders (Ohio State)
- Myia Johnson (Rutgers)

Legend

- (C) Team captain
- (S) Suspended
- (I) Ineligible
- (W) Walk-on
- Injured
- Current redshirt

Roster
Last update: January 1, 2024

== Schedule and results ==
Date time, TV	Rank^{#}	Opponent^{#}	Result	Record	High points	High rebounds	High assists	Site (attendance) city, state
Non-conference regular season
November 8, 2023*; 6:30 pm, ESPN+		at Youngstown State	L 41–55	0–1	13 – Blackford	9 – Blackford	2 – Kvirkvelia	Beeghly Center (1,259); Youngstown, OH
November 11, 2023*; 7:00 pm, FloSports		James Madison	L 54–81	0–2	17 – Woods	7 – Blackford	4 – Woods	Cintas Center (550); Cincinnati, OH
November 14, 2023*; 6:30 pm, ESPN+		at Old Dominion	L 43–55	0–3	10 – Scarlett	16 – Blackford	4 – Scarlett	Chartway Arena (2,096); Norfolk, VA
November 18, 2023*; 2:00 pm, FloSports		Bowling Green	L 64–73	0–4	25 – Scarlett	8 – Blackford	3 – 3 Tied	Cintas Center (513); Cincinnati, OH
November 21, 2023*; 7:00 pm, FloSports		Kent State	L 57–64	0–5	19 – Blackford	13 – Blackford	6 – Scarlett	Cintas Center (324); Cincinnati, OH
November 27, 2023*; 7:00 pm, ESPN+		at Miami (OH)	L 57–58 ^{OT}	0–6	22 – Scarlett	13 – Blackford	7 – Purvis	Millett Hall (344); Oxford, OH
December 1, 2023*; 6:00 pm, ASU Live Stream		vs. Temple; Briann January Classic	L 41–78	0–7	16 – Woods	5 – Kvirkvelia	2 – 4 Tied	Desert Financial Arena; Tempe, AZ
December 2, 2023*; 6:00 pm		at Arizona State; Briann January Classic	Canceled					Desert Financial Arena; Tempe, AZ
December 7, 2023*; 12:00 pm, FloSports		Oakland	Postponed					Cintas Center; Cincinnati, OH
December 10, 2023*; 2:00 pm, ESPN+		at Cincinnati; Crosstown Shootout	L 47–69	0–8	11 – Woods	5 – Blackford	5 – Purvis	Fifth Third Arena (5,013); Cincinnati, OH
December 15, 2023*; 7:00 pm, FloSports		SIU Edwardsville	W 68–43	1–8	14 – Mayo	11 – Blackford	6 – Purvis	Cintas Center (361); Cincinnati, OH
Big East regular season
December 20, 2023; 12:00 pm, BEDN/FloSports		DePaul	L 55–76	1–9 (0–1)	9 – 2 Tied	6 – Blackford	6 – Purvis	Cintas Center (326); Cincinnati, OH
December 30, 2023; 2:00 pm, BEDN/FloSports		at Villanova	L 45–86	1–10 (0–2)	12 – López	5 – López	3 – Blackford	Finneran Pavilion (2,341); Villanova, PA
January 6, 2024; 3:00 pm, BEDN/FloSports		at No. 19 Marquette	L 52–81	1–11 (0–3)	13 – López	9 – Blackford	3 – Purvis	Al McGuire Center (1,616); Milwaukee, WI
January 9, 2024; 7:00 pm, BEDN/FloSports		St. John's	L 42–60	1–12 (0–4)	14 – Mayo	15 – Blackford	2 – 2 Tied	Cintas Center (278); Cincinnati, OH
January 13, 2024; 4:00 pm, FS1		Seton Hall	L 47–61	1–13 (0–5)	14 – Mayo	6 – Blackford	3 – 2 Tied	Cintas Center (697); Cincinnati, OH
January 16, 2024; 8:00 pm, BEDN/FloSports		at DePaul	L 47–79	1–14 (0–6)	9 – Tied	7 – Blackford	4 – Purvis	Wintrust Arena (854); Chicago, IL
January 20, 2024; 2:00 pm, BEDN/FloSports		at Georgetown	L 49–77	1–15 (0–7)	21 – Scarlett	8 – Blackford	3 – Scarlett	McDonough Arena (989); Washington, D.C.
January 24, 2024; 7:00 pm, BEDN/FloSports		Butler	L 57–90	1–16 (0–8)	18 – Scarlett	6 – Purvis	3 – Tied	Cintas Center (238); Cincinnati, OH
January 27, 2024; 2:00 pm, BEDN/FloSports		Providence	L 60–69	1–17 (0–9)	17 – Scarlett	8 – Blackford	5 – Purvis	Cintas Center (943); Cincinnati, OH
January 31, 2024; 7:00 pm, BEDN/FloSports		at St. John's	L 55–67	1–18 (0–10)	15 – Tied	8 – Purvis	3 – Scarlett	Carnesecca Arena (286); Queens, NY
February 6, 2024; 7:00 pm, BEDN/FloSports		No. 21 Creighton	L 46–77	1–19 (0–11)	26 – Scarlett	7 – Smith	4 – García Roig	Cintas Center (1,117); Cincinnati, OH
February 10, 2024; 1:00 pm, BEDN/FloSports		at Seton Hall	L 62–86	1–20 (0–12)	19 – Scarlett	5 – Harris	4 – García Roig	Walsh Gymnasium (1,104); South Orange, NJ
February 14, 2024; 7:00 pm, SNY		No. 15 UConn	L 40–86	1–21 (0–13)	14 – Mayo	4 – Tied	3 – López	Cintas Center (2,952); Cincinnati, OH
February 18, 2024; 2:00 pm, BEDN/FloSports		at Providence	L 42–66	1–22 (0–14)	12 – Scarlett	7 – Scarlett	3 – Mayo	Alumni Hall (1,063); Providence, RI
February 21, 2024; 6:30 pm, FS2		at Butler	L 46–84	1–23 (0–15)	14 – Harris	4 – Harris	5 – García Roig	Hinkle Fieldhouse (933); Indianapolis, IN
February 24, 2024; 2:00 pm, BEDN/FloSports		Marquette	L 60–86	1–24 (0–16)	15 – Scarlett	4 – Tied	3 – Tied	Cintas Center (412); Cincinnati, OH
February 27, 2024; 7:00 pm, BEDN/FloSports		at No. 23 Creighton	L 57–99	1–25 (0–17)	13 – Mayo	4 – Tied	2 – Tied	D. J. Sokol Arena (1,411); Omaha, NE
March 2, 2024; 2:00 pm, BEDN/FloSports		Georgetown	L 46–66	1–26 (0–18)	16 – Blackford	10 – Blackford	4 – Scarlett	Cintas Center (840); Cincinnati, OH
Big East tournament
March 8, 2024; 4:00 pm, BEDN/FloSports	(11)	vs. (6) Georgetown; First Round	L 40–62	1–27	12 – Tied	9 – Blackford	3 – Purvis	Mohegan Sun Arena (4,898); Uncasville, CT
*Non-conference game. ^{#}Rankings from AP Poll. (#) Tournament seedings in parentheses. All times are in Eastern.
