= 2023–24 Butler Bulldogs women's basketball team =

American college basketball season

2023–24 Butler Bulldogs women's basketball

WNIT, Second Round
- Conference: Big East Conference
- Record: 15–17 (6–12 Big East)
- Head coach: Austin Parkinson (2nd season)
- Assistant coaches: Latrell Flemming; Kristin Wodrich; Holly Hoopingarner
- Home arena: Hinkle Fieldhouse

2023–24 Big East women's basketball standings
| | Conf. | | | | Overall |
| Team | W | | L | PCT | W | | L | PCT |
|---|---|---|---|---|---|---|---|---|
| No. 3 UConn † | 18 | – | 0 | 1.000 | 33 | – | 6 | .846 |
| No. 23 Creighton | 15 | – | 3 | .833 | 26 | – | 6 | .813 |
| St. John's | 11 | – | 7 | .611 | 18 | – | 15 | .545 |
| Villanova | 11 | – | 7 | .611 | 22 | – | 13 | .629 |
| Marquette | 11 | – | 7 | .611 | 23 | – | 9 | .719 |
| Georgetown | 9 | – | 9 | .500 | 23 | – | 12 | .657 |
| Seton Hall | 8 | – | 10 | .444 | 17 | – | 15 | .531 |
| Butler | 6 | – | 12 | .333 | 15 | – | 17 | .469 |
| Providence | 6 | – | 12 | .333 | 13 | – | 21 | .382 |
| DePaul | 4 | – | 14 | .222 | 12 | – | 20 | .375 |
| Xavier | 0 | – | 18 | .000 | 1 | – | 27 | .036 |
† 2024 Big East tournament winner Rankings from AP poll

The 2023–24 Butler Bulldogs women's basketball team represented Butler University in the 2023–24 NCAA Division I women's basketball season. The Bulldogs, led by second year head coach Austin Parkinson, played their home games at Hinkle Fieldhouse and were members of the Big East Conference.

== Previous season ==
The Bulldogs finished the 2022–23 season 11–18, 6–14 in Big East play to finish in a tie for eighth place. As the No. 8 seed in the Big East tournament, they lost in the first round to Georgetown.

== Offseason ==
=== Departures ===
| Name | Number | Pos. | Height | Year | Hometown | Reason for departure |
|---|---|---|---|---|---|---|
| Madison Royal-Davis | 3 | G | 5'11" | Sophomore | Toledo, OH | Transferred to Oakland |
| Jessica Carrothers | 4 | G/F | 6'2" | Freshman | Fishers, IN | Transferred to Indiana Northwest |
| Shay Frederick | 5 | G | 5'7" | GS senior | Greenville, WI | Graduated |
| Trinity White | 10 | G | 5'9" | Sophomore | McKinney, TX | Transferred to Murray State |
| Tenley Dowell | 11 | G | 6'0" | RS senior | Morton, IL | Graduate transferred to UAB |
| Rachel McLimore | 14 | G/F | 5'10" | GS senior | Zionsville, IN | Graduated |
| Kelsy Taylor | 44 | F | 6'2" | GS senior | Louisville, KY | Graduated |

=== Incoming transfers ===
| Name | Number | Pos. | Height | Year | Hometown | Previous school |
|---|---|---|---|---|---|---|
| Ari Wiggins | 3 | G | 5'8" | Junior | Indianapolis, IN | Michigan |
| Rachel Kent | 10 | G/F | 5'11" | GS senior | Des Plaines, IL | IUPUI |
| Lilly Stoddard | 31 | F | 6'4" | Sophomore | Crown Point, IN | Purdue |
| Anna Mortag | 34 | G | 6'0" | Senior | Milwaukee, WI | IUPUI |

==== Recruiting ====
There was no recruiting class of 2023.

== Roster ==
2023–24 Butler Bulldogs women's basketball team
Players
Coaches

| Pos. | # | Name | Height | Year | Previous school | Hometown |
|---|---|---|---|---|---|---|
| G | 1 | Karsyn Norman | 5 ft 6 in (1.68 m) | Fr | Bedford North Lawrence | Bedford, IN |
| G/F | 2 | Riley Makalusky | 6 ft 2 in (1.88 m) | Fr | Hamilton Southeastern | Fishers, IN |
| G | 3 | Ari Wiggins | 5 ft 8 in (1.73 m) | Jr | Heritage Christian; Michigan | Indianapolis, IN |
| G/F | 10 | Rachel Kent | 5 ft 11 in (1.8 m) | GS | Maine West; IUPUI | Des Plaines, IL |
| G | 12 | Chloe Jeffers | 5 ft 10 in (1.78 m) | So | Delaware Hayes | Delaware, OH |
| G | 21 | Caroline Strande | 5 ft 11 in (1.8 m) | Sr | Racine Lutheran; Minnesota | Racine, WI |
| F | 22 | Rosemarie Dumont | 6 ft 3 in (1.91 m) | Sr | Sainte-Foy | Quebec City, QC |
| G | 23 | Jordan Meulemans | 6 ft 0 in (1.83 m) | So | De Pere | De Pere, WI |
| F | 24 | Cristen Carter | 6 ft 4 in (1.93 m) | Fr | Ben Davis | Indianapolis, IN |
| G/F | 30 | Abby Stoddard | 6 ft 1 in (1.85 m) | Sr | Crown Point | Crown Point, IN |
| F | 31 | Lilly Stoddard | 6 ft 4 in (1.93 m) | So | Crown Point; Purdue | Crown Point, IN |
| F | 32 | Sydney James | 6 ft 3 in (1.91 m) | Jr | Trinity Lutheran | Brownstown, IN |
| G/F | 34 | Anna Mortag | 6 ft 0 in (1.83 m) | Sr | Brookfield Central; IUPUI | Milwaukee, WI |
| G | 55 | Kendall Wingler | 5 ft 10 in (1.78 m) | RS Sr | Meade County; Eastern Kentucky | Ekron, KY |

Head coach

- Austin Parkinson (Purdue)

Assistant coach(es)

- Latrell Fleming (Wisconsin)
- Kristin Wodrich (Texas Tech)
- Holly Hoopingarner (IUPUI)

Legend

- (C) Team captain
- (S) Suspended
- (I) Ineligible
- (W) Walk-on
- Injured
- Current redshirt

Roster

== Schedule ==
| Date time, TV | Rank^{#} | Opponent^{#} | Result | Record | High points | High rebounds | High assists | Site (attendance) city, state |
Exhibition
| October 30, 2023*; 7:00 p.m. | | Franklin (IN) | W 108–41 | | – | – | – | Hinkle Fieldhouse; Indianapolis, IN |
Regular season
| November 6, 2023*; 12:00 p.m., ESPN+ | | at Iowa State | L 55–82 | 0–1 | 17 – Strande | 7 – Strande | 4 – Kent | Hilton Coliseum (9,938); Ames, IA |
| November 12, 2023*; 5:00 p.m., FloSports | | Detroit Mercy | W 68–61 | 1–1 | 18 – Wingler | 7 – Strande | 2 – Tied | Hinkle Fieldhouse (1,162); Indianapolis, IN |
| November 18, 2023*; 5:00 p.m., FloSports | | Austin Peay | W 53–47 | 2–1 | 21 – Strande | 7 – Strande | 3 – Jaynes | Hinkle Fieldhouse (1,087); Indianapolis, IN |
| November 20, 2023*; 11:00 a.m., YouTube | | Roosevelt | W 104–50 | 3–1 | 23 – Makalusky | 9 – Stoddard | 5 – Norman | Hinkle Fieldhouse (2,626); Indianapolis, IN |
| November 24, 2023*; 6:30 p.m., ESPN+ | | at Pacific; Tiger Turkey Tip-Off | L 66–77 | 3–2 | 11 – Wiggins | 9 – Kent | 7 – Kent | Alex G. Spanos Center (494); Stockton, CA |
| November 25, 2023*; 4:00 p.m., ESPN+ | | vs. St. Thomas; Tiger Turkey Tip-Off | W 76–54 | 4–2 | 24 – Meulemans | 9 – Strande | 4 – Wiggins | Alex G. Spanos Center; Stockton, CA |
| November 29, 2023*; 7:00 p.m., FloSports | | Bradley | W 67–46 | 5–2 | 17 – Strande | 8 – Meulemans | 4 – Jaynes | Hinkle Fieldhouse (692); Indianapolis, IN |
| December 3, 2023*; 1:00 p.m., BTN+ | | at Wisconsin | W 59–51 | 6–2 | 25 – Kent | 9 – Strande | 5 – Wiggins | Kohl Center (3,581); Madison, WI |
| December 7, 2023*; 7:00 p.m., FloSports | | Vanderbilt | L 39–51 | 6–3 | 12 – Strande | 8 – Jaynes | 4 – Kent | Hinkle Fieldhouse (873); Indianapolis, IN |
| December 10, 2023*; 2:00 p.m., FloSports | | Chicago State | W 84–51 | 7–3 | 23 – Meulemans | 9 – Strande | 6 – Tied | Hinkle Fieldhouse (654); Indianapolis, IN |
| December 18, 2023; 7:00 p.m., SNY | | at No. 17 UConn | L 62–88 | 7–4 (0–1) | 13 – Tied | 5 – Strande | 5 – Wiggins | XL Center (9,354); Hartford, CT |
| December 21, 2023*; 1:00 p.m., Youtube | | Ohio | W 69–49 | 8–4 | 18 – Kent | 13 – Strande | 6 – Kent | Hinkle Fieldhouse (1,038); Indianapolis, IN |
| January 3, 2024; 7:00 p.m., BEDN | | Georgetown | L 55–60 | 8–5 (0–2) | 22 – Kent | 9 – Strande | 3 – Meulemans | Hinkle Fieldhouse (892); Indianapolis, IN |
| January 6, 2024; 2:00 p.m., BEDN | | Seton Hall | L 50–64 | 8–6 (0–3) | 15 – Meulemans | 6 – Strande | 3 – Strande | Hinkle Fieldhouse (979); Indianapolis, IN |
| January 10, 2024; 7:00 p.m., BEDN | | at No. 22 Creighton | L 53–89 | 8–7 (0–4) | 10 – Kent | 5 – Tied | 2 – Tied | D. J. Sokol Arena (1,131); Omaha, NE |
| January 13, 2024; 7:30 p.m., BEDN | | Villanova | L 54–65 | 8–8 (0–5) | 12 – Strande | 10 – Strande | 3 – Kent | Hinkle Fieldhouse (777); Indianapolis, IN |
| January 17, 2024; 7:00 p.m., BEDN | | at St. John's | L 42–60 | 8–9 (0–6) | 13 – Jaynes | 6 – Strande | 3 – Jaynes | Carnesecca Arena (293); Queens, NY |
| January 21, 2024; 12:00 p.m., FS1 | | Providence | L 53–63 | 8–10 (0–7) | 22 – Strande | 8 – Tied | 3 – Strande | Hinkle Fieldhouse (157); Indianapolis, IN |
| January 24, 2024; 7:00 p.m., BEDN | | at Xavier | W 90–57 | 9–10 (1–7) | 26 – Strande | 10 – Strande | 6 – Tied | Cintas Center (238); Cincinnati, OH |
| January 27, 2024; 3:00 p.m., BEDN | | at Marquette | L 48–59 | 9–11 (1–8) | 13 – Strande | 7 – Norman | 4 – Strande | Al McGuire Center (2,212); Milwaukee, WI |
| January 31, 2024; 7:00 p.m., BEDN | | DePaul | L 57–67 | 9–12 (1–9) | 12 – Strande | 7 – Strande | 3 – Strande | Hinkle Fieldhouse (808); Indianapolis, IN |
| February 4, 2024; 2:00 p.m., BEDN | | No. 22 Creighton | L 65–75 | 9–13 (1–10) | 15 – Jaynes | 6 – Kent | 4 – Tied | Hinkle Fieldhouse (1,041); Indianapolis, IN |
| February 9, 2024; 7:00 p.m., BEDN | | St. John's | W 64–59 | 10–13 (2–10) | 18 – Strande | 9 – Strande | 6 – Jaynes | Hinkle Fieldhouse (1,238); Indianapolis, IN |
| February 14, 2024; 7:00 p.m., BEDN | | at Providence | W 55–48 | 11–13 (3–10) | 22 – Strande | 9 – Strande | 3 – Kent | Alumni Hall (507); Providence, RI |
| February 17, 2024; 4:00 p.m., BEDN | | at Villanova | W 55–52 | 12–13 (4–10) | 19 – Strande | 9 – Strande | 3 – Tied | Finneran Pavilion (3,059); Villanova, PA |
| February 21, 2024; 6:30 p.m., FS2 | | Xavier | W 84–46 | 13–13 (5–10) | 17 – Strande | 6 – Kent | 6 – Wiggins | Hinkle Fieldhouse (933); Indianapolis, IN |
| February 24, 2024; 2:00 p.m., BEDN | | at Georgetown | L 63–70 | 13–14 (5–11) | 21 – Makalusky | 9 – Strande | 4 – Norman | McDonough Gymnasium (919); Washington, D.C. |
| February 28, 2024; 8:00 p.m., BEDN | | at DePaul | W 73–70 | 14–14 (6–11) | 15 – Tied | 7 – Strande | 4 – Jaynes | Wintrust Arena (1,154); Chicago, IL |
| March 2, 2024; 3:00 p.m., BEDN | | Marquette | L 52–74 | 14–15 (6–12) | 10 – Norman | 5 – Tied | 2 – Tied | Hinkle Fieldhouse (1,780); Indianapolis, IN |
Big East Women's Tournament
| March 8, 2024*; 11:00 a.m., BEDN | (8) | vs. (9) Providence; First Round | L 60–75 | 14–16 | 20 – Strande | 7 – Strande | 5 – Norman | Mohegan Sun Arena; Uncasville, CT |
WNIT
| March 21, 2024*; 7:00 p.m., YouTube | | Bowling Green; First Round | W 75–63 | 15–16 | 24 – Strande | 5 – Strande | 5 – Tied | Hinkle Fieldhouse (537); Indianapolis, IN |
| March 25, 2024*; 7:00 p.m., YouTube | | Purdue; Second Round | L 51–62 | 15–17 | 14 – Makalusky | 7 – Jaynes | 6 – Norman | Hinkle Fieldhouse (1,968); Indianapolis, IN |
*Non-conference game. ^{#}Rankings from AP Poll. (#) Tournament seedings in parentheses. All times are in EST.

== See also ==
- 2023–24 Butler Bulldogs men's basketball team
