= 2023–24 St. John's Red Storm women's basketball team =

American college basketball season

2023–24 St. John's Red Storm women's basketball

WBIT, Second Round
- Conference: Big East Conference
- Record: 18–15 (11–7 Big East)
- Head coach: Joe Tartamella (12th season)
- Assistant coaches: Candice Hill; Shenneika Smith; Joe Rutigliano
- Home arena: Carnesecca Arena

2023–24 Big East women's basketball standings
	Conf.				Overall
Team	W		L	PCT	W		L	PCT
No. 3 UConn †	18	–	0	1.000	33	–	6	.846
No. 23 Creighton	15	–	3	.833	26	–	6	.813
St. John's	11	–	7	.611	18	–	15	.545
Villanova	11	–	7	.611	22	–	13	.629
Marquette	11	–	7	.611	23	–	9	.719
Georgetown	9	–	9	.500	23	–	12	.657
Seton Hall	8	–	10	.444	17	–	15	.531
Butler	6	–	12	.333	15	–	17	.469
Providence	6	–	12	.333	13	–	21	.382
DePaul	4	–	14	.222	12	–	20	.375
Xavier	0	–	18	.000	1	–	27	.036
† 2024 Big East tournament winner Rankings from AP poll

The 2023–24 St. John's Red Storm women's basketball team represented St. John's University during the 2023–24 NCAA Division I women's basketball season. The Red Storm, led by twelfth-year head coach Joe Tartamella, played their games at Carnesecca Arena and were members of the Big East Conference.

== Previous season ==
The Red Storm finished the season at 23–9 and 11–7 in Big East play to finish in a tie for fourth place. As a No. 5 seed in the Big East women's tournament, they lost in the quarterfinals to Marquette. They received an at-large bid to the NCAA women's tournament as they were the last four teams in, where they defeated Purdue in the first four to advance to the first round, where they lost to North Carolina.

== Offseason ==
=== Departures ===
St. John's departures
Name	Num	Pos.	Height	Year	Hometown	Reason for departure
Mimi Reid	2	G	5'8"	GS senior	Bronx, NY	Graduated
Danielle Patterson	3	F	6'2"	GS senior	Brooklyn, NY	Graduated
Jayla Everett	4	G	5'10"	(redshirt) Senior	St. Louis, MO	Graduated
Sitota Gines	11	G	5'10"	Sophomore	Zaragoza, Spain	Transferred to Buffalo
Danielle Cosgrove	13	F	6'4"	(redshirt) Senior	Holbrook, NY	Graduated
Rayven Peeples	20	F	6'3"	(redshirt) Senior	Detroit, MI	Graduated/signed to play professionally in England with Leicester Riders
Kadaja Bailey	30	G	6'0"	(redshirt) Senior	Long Beach, NY	Graduated
Katie Burton	33	G	5'9"	Sophomore	Fishers, IN	Transferred to Buffalo

=== Incoming transfers ===
St. John's incoming transfers
Name	Num	Pos.	Height	Year	Hometown	Previous school
Phoenix Gedeon	21	F	6'0"	Junior	Montreal, QC	Robert Morris
Ber'Nyah Mayo	23	G	5'6"	Senior	Wilmington, DE	UMass
Tara Daye	44	G	5'10"	Sophomore	Newark, NJ	DePaul

==== Recruiting ====
There was no recruiting class of 2023.

==== Recruiting class of 2024 ====
College recruiting (2024)
Name	Hometown	School	Height	Weight	Commit date
Ariel Little; PG	Brooklyn, NY	South Shore High School	5 ft 4 in (1.63 m)	N/A	
Ariel Little; PG	Recruit ratings: ESPN: (91)				
Overall recruit ranking:
Note: In many cases, Scout, Rivals, 247Sports, On3, and ESPN may conflict in their listings of height and weight.; In these cases, the average was taken. ESPN grades are on a 100-point scale.; Sources: "2024 Player Commits". ESPN. Archived from the original on December 27, 2023.

== Roster ==
2023–24 St. John's Red Storm women's basketball team
Players
Coaches

Pos.	#	Name	Height	Year	Previous school	Hometown
G	1	Unique Drake	5 ft 7 in (1.7 m)	RS Sr	Westwood	Columbia, SC
F	2	Julie Bahati	6 ft 2 in (1.88 m)	Fr	Springfield Central	Nairobi, Kenya
G	3	Tyonna Bailey	5 ft 10 in (1.78 m)	Fr	Immaculate Conception	Newark, NJ
G	4	Skye Owen	5 ft 7 in (1.7 m)	So	St. Francis Prep	Staten Island, NY
G	5	Jailah Donald	5 ft 7 in (1.7 m)	So	Serra	Inglewood, CA
G	10	Jayda Brown	6 ft 0 in (1.83 m)	Fr	Forest Park	Atlanta, GA
F	14	Jillian Archer	6 ft 2 in (1.88 m)	GS	Bishop Alemany; Georgetown	Santa Monica, CA
F	21	Phoenix Gedeon	6 ft 0 in (1.83 m)	Jr	Life Center Academy; Robert Morris	Montreal, QC
F	22	Nevaeh Wingate	6 ft 0 in (1.83 m)	Fr	Liverpool	Liverpool, NY
G	23	Ber'Nyah Mayo	5 ft 6 in (1.68 m)	Sr	St. Elizbeth; UMass	Wilmington, DE
G	44	Tara Daye	5 ft 10 in (1.78 m)	So	University; DePaul	Newark, NJ

Head coach

- Joe Tartamella (James Madison)

Assistant coach(es)

- Candice Hill (Loyola (MD))
- Shenneika Smith (St. John's)
- Joe Rutigliano (Saint Francis (PA))

Legend

- (C) Team captain
- (S) Suspended
- (I) Ineligible
- (W) Walk-on
- Injured
- Current redshirt

Roster

== Schedule and results ==
Date time, TV	Rank^{#}	Opponent^{#}	Result	Record	High points	High rebounds	High assists	Site (attendance) city, state
Regular season
November 6, 2023*; 7:00 p.m., FloSports		LIU	W 81–44	1–0	27 – Drake	12 – Archer	6 – Owen	Carnesecca Arena (386); Queens, NY
November 10, 2023*; 7:00 p.m., FloSports		at Monmouth	L 69–74	1–1	24 – Drake	9 – Tied	4 – Owen	OceanFirst Bank Center (921); West Long Branch, NJ
November 16, 2023*; 7:00 p.m., FloSports		Penn State	L 53–69	1–2	16 – Mayo	10 – Archer	5 – Mayo	Carnesecca Arena (396); Queens, NY
November 19, 2023*; 2:00 p.m., FloSports		Manhattan	W 67–47	2–2	30 – Drake	7 – Tied	4 – Owen	Carnesecca Arena (324); Queens, NY
November 23, 2023*; 5:30 p.m., FloSports		vs. VCU; Discover Puerto Rico Classic	L 51–56	2–3	20 – Mayo	5 – Archer	1 – Tied	José Miguel Agrelot Coliseum (250); San Juan, PR
November 24, 2023*; 3:00 p.m., FloSports		vs. UCF; Discover Puerto Rico Classic	L 48–61	2–4	16 – Drake	7 – Brown	3 – Tied	José Miguel Agrelot Coliseum (250); San Juan, PR
November 25, 2023*; 8:00 p.m., FloSports		vs. Jackson State; Discover Puerto Rico Classic	L 56–60	2–5	17 – Drake	7 – Brown	3 – Brown	José Miguel Agrelot Coliseum (250); San Juan, PR
November 29, 2023*; 7:00 p.m., FloSports		Loyola (MD)	W 71–49	3–5	24 – Drake	11 – Archer	7 – Mayo	Carnesecca Arena (343); Queens, NY
December 2, 2023*; 7:00 p.m., ESPN+		at Marist	W 50–40	4–5	19 – Drake	12 – Gedeon	1 – Tied	McCann Arena (1,121); Poughkeepsie, NY
December 7, 2023*; 7:00 p.m., ESPN+		at Fairfield	L 62–67	4–6	21 – Drake	7 – Archer	7 – Mayo	Leo D. Mahoney Arena (850); Fairfield, CT
December 10, 2023*; 2:00 p.m., FloSports		Rhode Island	W 55–44	5–6	16 – Drake	10 – Gedeon	5 – Mayo	Carnesecca Arena (316); Queens, NY
December 16, 2023; 6:00 p.m., FloSports		Villanova	W 51–46	6–6 (1–0)	16 – Drake	14 – Archer	3 – Tied	Madison Square Garden (12,720); New York, NY
December 21, 2023*; 12:00 p.m., ESPN+		at Yale	W 75–56	7–6	30 – Drake	5 – Archer	4 – Tied	John J. Lee Amphitheater (270); New Haven, CT
December 30, 2023; 5:00 p.m., FloSports		at No. 21 Creighton	L 56–67	7–7 (1–1)	19 – Archer	9 – Daye	3 – Drake	D. J. Sokol Arena (1,839); Omaha, NE
January 3, 2024; 7:00 p.m., FloSports		No. 19 Marquette	W 57–56	8–7 (2–1)	24 – Drake	6 – Owen	3 – Mayo	Carnesecca Arena (147); Queens, NY
January 6, 2024; 6:00 p.m., FS1		at Providence	W 55–48	9–7 (3–1)	24 – Drake	7 – Archer	3 – Mayo	Alumni Hall (958); Providence, RI
January 9, 2024; 7:00 p.m., FloSports		at Xavier	W 60–42	10–7 (4–1)	17 – Archer	10 – Archer	4 – Tied	Cintas Center (278); Cincinnati, OH
January 13, 2024; 2:00 p.m., SNY		No. 13 UConn	L 49–92	10–8 (4–2)	11 – Donald	4 – Donald	4 – Mayo	UBS Arena (2,858); Elmont, NY
January 17, 2024; 7:00 p.m., FloSports		Butler	W 60–42	11–8 (5–2)	13 – Jaynes	6 – Strande	3 – Jaynes	Carnesecca Arena (293); Queens, NY
January 22, 2024; 6:30 p.m., FS1		at Seton Hall	L 66–74 ^{OT}	11–9 (5–3)	23 – Mayo	8 – Archer	6 – Mayo	Walsh Gymnasium (1,029); South Orange, NJ
January 25, 2024; 8:00 p.m., FloSports		at DePaul	W 83–77 ^{2OT}	12–9 (6–3)	36 – Drake	11 – Archer	6 – Mayo	Wintrust Arena (994); Chicago, IL
January 28, 2024; 2:00 p.m., FloSports		Georgetown	W 57–56	13–9 (7–3)	18 – Drake	10 – Daye	4 – Mayo	Carnesecca Arena (698); Queens, NY
January 31, 2024; 7:00 p.m., FloSports		Xavier	W 67–55	14–9 (8–3)	24 – Drake	9 – Archer	8 – Owen	Carnesecca Arena (286); Queens, NY
February 4, 2024; 3:00 p.m., CBSSN		at No. 11 UConn	L 63–78	14–10 (8–4)	16 – Mayo	5 – Archer	4 – Daye	Harry A. Gampel Pavilion (10,299); Storrs, CT
February 9, 2024; 7:00 p.m., FloSports		at Butler	L 59–64	14–11 (8–5)	23 – Archer	13 – Archer	6 – Mayo	Hinkle Fieldhouse (1,238); Indianapolis, IN
February 13, 2024; 7:00 p.m., FloSports		Seton Hall	W 68–57	15–11 (9–5)	26 – Drake	12 – Archer	4 – Donald	Carnesecca Arena (284); Queens, NY
February 16, 2024; 7:00 p.m., FloSports		No. 20 Creighton	L 51–71	15–12 (9–6)	16 – Mayo	6 – Archer	2 – Tied	Carnesecca Arena (476); Queens, NY
February 20, 2024; 7:00 p.m., FloSports		at Georgetown	L 43–51	15–13 (9–7)	14 – Drake	14 – Archer	2 – Drake	McDonough Gymnasium (322); Washington, D.C.
February 24, 2024; 2:00 p.m., FloSports		Providence	W 60–42	16–13 (10–7)	13 – Donald	9 – Archer	6 – Mayo	Carnesecca Arena (410); Queens, NY
February 27, 2024; 8:30 p.m., FS1		at Marquette	W 56–50	17–13 (11–7)	19 – Mayo	11 – Tied	2 – 3 Tied	Al McGuire Center (2,323); Milwaukee, WI
Big East Women's Tournament
March 9, 2024; 9:30 p.m., FS2	(3)	vs. (6) Georgetown; Quarterfinals	L 44–53	17–14	16 – Archer	3 – 4 Tied	2 – Drake	Mohegan Sun Arena; Uncasville, CT
WBIT
March 21, 2024*; 7:00 p.m., ESPN+		at (3) Florida; First Round	W 79–60	18–14	37 – Drake	8 – Archer	6 – Mayo	O'Connell Center (503); Gainesville, FL
March 24, 2024*; 2:00 p.m., ESPN+		at (2) Toledo; Second Round	L 71–72	18–15	21 – Drake	5 – Archer	6 – Donald	Savage Arena (2,521); Toledo, OH
*Non-conference game. ^{#}Rankings from AP Poll. (#) Tournament seedings in parentheses. All times are in Eastern Time.

== Rankings ==
Ranking movements Legend: ██ Increase in ranking ██ Decrease in ranking — = Not ranked RV = Received votes
	Week																				
Poll	Pre	1	2	3	4	5	6	7	8	9	10	11	12	13	14	15	16	17	18	19	Final
AP	—	—*	—	—	—	RV	—	—	—												Not released
Coaches	—	—*	—	—	—	—	—	—	—												

*The preseason and week 1 polls were the same.

== See also ==
- 2023–24 St. John's Red Storm men's basketball team
