= 2023–24 Marquette Golden Eagles women's basketball team =

Intercollegiate basketball season team

2023–24 Marquette Golden Eagles women's basketball
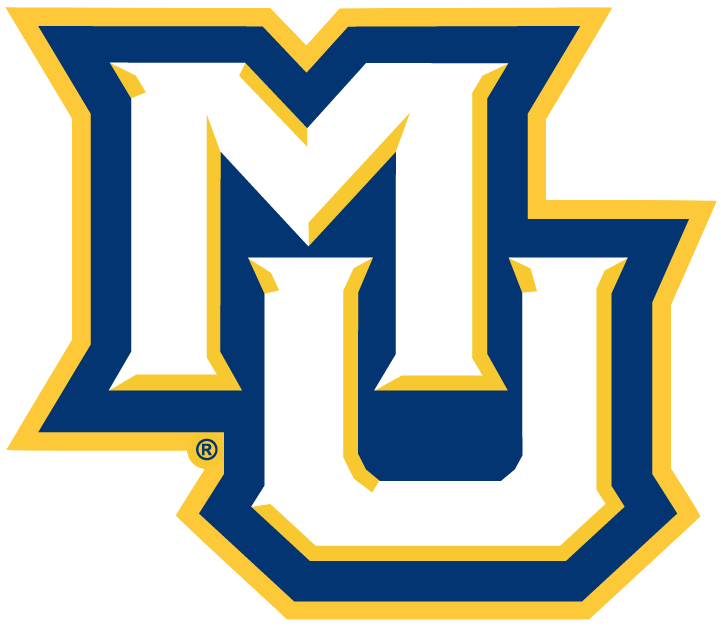

Fort Myers Tip-Off Shell Division champions

NCAA tournament, First Round
- Conference: Big East Conference
- Record: 23–9 (11–7 Big East)
- Head coach: Megan Duffy (5th season)
- Associate head coach: Justine Raterman
- Assistant coaches: Khadijah Rushdan; Kayla Kleifgen
- Home arena: Al McGuire Center

2023–24 Big East women's basketball standings
| | Conf. | | | | Overall |
| Team | W | | L | PCT | W | | L | PCT |
|---|---|---|---|---|---|---|---|---|
| No. 3 UConn † | 18 | – | 0 | 1.000 | 33 | – | 6 | .846 |
| No. 23 Creighton | 15 | – | 3 | .833 | 26 | – | 6 | .813 |
| St. John's | 11 | – | 7 | .611 | 18 | – | 15 | .545 |
| Villanova | 11 | – | 7 | .611 | 22 | – | 13 | .629 |
| Marquette | 11 | – | 7 | .611 | 23 | – | 9 | .719 |
| Georgetown | 9 | – | 9 | .500 | 23 | – | 12 | .657 |
| Seton Hall | 8 | – | 10 | .444 | 17 | – | 15 | .531 |
| Butler | 6 | – | 12 | .333 | 15 | – | 17 | .469 |
| Providence | 6 | – | 12 | .333 | 13 | – | 21 | .382 |
| DePaul | 4 | – | 14 | .222 | 12 | – | 20 | .375 |
| Xavier | 0 | – | 18 | .000 | 1 | – | 27 | .036 |
† 2024 Big East tournament winner Rankings from AP poll

The 2023–24 Marquette Golden Eagles women's basketball team represented Marquette University during the 2023–24 NCAA Division I women's basketball season. The Golden Eagles, were led by fifth-year head coach Megan Duffy and played their home games at the Al McGuire Center as members of the Big East Conference.

== Previous season ==
The Golden Eagles finished the 2022–23 season 21–11, 13–7 in Big East play to finish in a tie for fourth place. As the #5 seed in the Big East tournament, they defeated #4 seed St. John's in the quarterfinals, before falling to top-seeded and eventual tournament champions UConn in the semifinals. They received an at-large bid into the NCAA tournament, receiving the #9 seed in the Greenville 1 Region. They were defeated by #8 region seed South Florida in the first round.

== Offseason ==
=== Departures ===
Marquette Departures
| Name | Num | Pos. | Height | Year | Hometown | Reason for Departure |
|---|---|---|---|---|---|---|
| Nia Clark | 1 | G | 5'9" | Senior | Indianapolis, IN | Transferred to Cincinnati |
| Emily La Chapell | 21 | G | 5'11" | Freshman | Appleton, WI | Transferred to Belmont |
| Nirel Lougbo | - | G | 5'10" | Senior | North Andover, MA | Medically retired |
| Chloe Marotta | 52 | F | 6'1" | Senior | Mequon, WI | Graduated |
| Kennedi Myles | 44 | F | 6'2" | Senior | Cincinnati, OH | Transferred to Eastern Michigan |
| Julianna Okosun | 0 | F | 6'4" | Junior | Copenhagen, Denmark | Graduated |
| Makiyah Williams | 24 | F | 6'0" | Sophomore | Chicago, IL | Transferred to UIC |

=== Incoming transfers ===
Marquette incoming transfers
| Name | Num | Pos. | Height | Year | Hometown | Previous School |
|---|---|---|---|---|---|---|
| Abbey Cracknell | 4 | F | 5'11" | Junior | Avoca Beach, Australia | Gulf Coast State College |
| Frannie Hottinger | 20 | G/F | 6'1" | Graduate Student | Inver Grove Heights, MN | Lehigh |
| Bridget Utberg | 2 | G | 5'5" | Sophomore | Canton, GA | Central Michigan |
| Lee Volker | 1 | G | 6'1" | Junior | Purcellville, VA | Duke |

== Roster ==
2023–24 Marquette Golden Eagles women's basketball team
Players
Coaches

| Pos. | # | Name | Height | Year | Previous school | Hometown |
|---|---|---|---|---|---|---|
| G | 1 | Lee Volker | 6 ft 1 in (1.85 m) | Jr | Duke | Purcellville, Virginia |
| G | 2 | Bridget Utberg | 5 ft 5 in (1.65 m) | So | Central Michigan | Canton, Georgia |
| G | 3 | Rose Nkumu | 5 ft 9 in (1.75 m) | Sr | Iowa City High School | Iowa City, Iowa |
| F | 4 | Abbey Cracknell | 5 ft 11 in (1.8 m) | Jr | Gulf Coast State College | Avoca Beach, Australia |
| F | 5 | Charia Smith | 6 ft 1 in (1.85 m) | So | Northland High School | Columbus, Ohio |
| G | 10 | Claire Kaifes | 6 ft 0 in (1.83 m) | Sr | Mill Valley High School | Shawnee, Kansas |
| F | 11 | Skylar Forbes | 6 ft 3 in (1.91 m) | Fr | Scarborough Prep | Markham, Ontario |
| G | 12 | Mackenzie Hare | 5 ft 9 in (1.75 m) | So | Naperville North High School | Naperville, Illinois |
| G/F | 20 | Frannie Hottinger | 6 ft 1 in (1.85 m) | GS | Lehigh | Inver Grove Heights, Minnesota |
| G | 22 | Halle Vice | 6 ft 1 in (1.85 m) | Fr | Pleasant Valley High School | Bettendorf, Iowa |
| G | 23 | Jordan King | 5 ft 11 in (1.8 m) | Sr | Hononegah High School | Rockton, Illinois |
| F | 32 | Liza Karlen | 6 ft 2 in (1.88 m) | Sr | Stillwater Area High School | Saint Paul, Minnesota |

Head coach

- Megan Duffy (Notre Dame)

Assistant coach(es)

- Justine Raterman (Dayton)
- Khadijah Rushdan (Rutgers)
- Kayla Kleifgen (Eckerd)

Legend

- (C) Team captain
- (S) Suspended
- (I) Ineligible
- (W) Walk-on
- Injured
- Current redshirt

Roster
Last update: December 30, 2023

== Schedule and results ==
| Date time, TV | Rank^{#} | Opponent^{#} | Result | Record | Site (attendance) city, state |
Regular season
| November 6, 2023*; 12:00 p.m., FloSports | | UT Martin | W 84–51 | 1–0 | Al McGuire Center (3,211); Milwaukee, WI |
| November 11, 2023*; 2:00 p.m., FloSports | | No. 23 Illinois | W 71–67 | 2–0 | Al McGuire Center (1,428); Milwaukee, WI |
| November 15, 2023*; 6:00 p.m., ESPN+ | | at IUPUI | W 92–58 | 3–0 | IUPUI Gymnasium (439); Indianapolis, IN |
| November 19, 2023*; 1:00 p.m., FloSports | | Saint Peter's | W 96–36 | 4–0 | Al McGuire Center (1,032); Milwaukee, WI |
| November 24, 2023*; 3:30 p.m. | | vs. Boston College; Fort Myers Tip-Off | W 73–65 | 5–0 | Suncoast Credit Union Arena (591); Fort Myers, FL |
| November 25, 2023*; 4:00 p.m. | | vs. Arkansas; Fort Myers Tip-Off | W 74–58 | 6–0 | Suncoast Credit Union Arena (227); Fort Myers, FL |
| November 29, 2023*; 7:00 p.m., FloSports | No. 23 | Memphis | W 88–59 | 7–0 | Al McGuire Center (1,226); Milwaukee, WI |
| December 3, 2023*; 1:00 p.m., FloSports | No. 23 | Penn | W 87–52 | 8–0 | Al McGuire Center (922); Milwaukee, WI |
| December 10, 2023*; 2:00 p.m., ESPN+ | No. 19 | at Illinois State | W 64–62 | 9–0 | CEFCU Arena (2,129); Normal, IL |
| December 13, 2023; 7:00 p.m., FloSports | No. 19 | No. 20 Creighton | W 76–70 | 10–0 (1–0) | Al McGuire Center (1,503); Milwaukee, WI |
| December 17, 2023*; 2:00 p.m., FloSports | No. 19 | Appalachian State | W 99–91 | 11–0 | Al McGuire Center (1,915); Milwaukee, WI |
| December 21, 2023*; 12:00 p.m., FloSports | No. 18 | Bucknell | W 67–39 | 12–0 | Al McGuire Center (2,240); Milwaukee, WI |
| December 31, 2023; 12:00 p.m., SNY | No. 18 | at No. 15 UConn | L 64–95 | 12–1 (1–1) | XL Center (15,684); Hartford, CT |
| January 3, 2024; 6:00 p.m., FloSports | No. 19 | at St. John's | L 56–57 | 12–2 (1–2) | Carnesecca Arena (147); Queens, NY |
| January 6, 2024; 2:00 p.m., FloSports | No. 19 | Xavier | W 81–52 | 13–2 (2–2) | Al McGuire Center (1,616); Milwaukee, WI |
| January 9, 2024; 7:30 p.m., FS1 | No. 23 | at Seton Hall | W 75–54 | 14–2 (3–2) | Walsh Gymnasium (336); South Orange, NJ |
| January 13, 2024; 8:00 p.m., CBSSN | No. 23 | DePaul | W 78–47 | 15–2 (4–2) | Al McGuire Center (1,830); Milwaukee, WI |
| January 17, 2024; 6:00 p.m., FloSports | No. 22 | at Villanova | L 63–66 | 15–3 (4–3) | Finneran Pavilion (1,643); Villanova, PA |
| January 23, 2024; 6:00 p.m., SNY | | No. 8 UConn | L 59–85 | 15–4 (4–4) | Al McGuire Center (3,585); Milwaukee, WI |
| January 27, 2024; 4:00 p.m., FloSports | | Butler | W 59–48 | 16–4 (5–4) | Al McGuire Center (2,212); Milwaukee, WI |
| January 31, 2024; 6:00 p.m., FloSports | | at No. 22 Creighton | L 71–76 | 16–5 (5–5) | D. J. Sokol Arena (1,321); Omaha, NE |
| February 3, 2024; 1:00 p.m., FloSports | | at Providence | W 66–62 | 17–5 (6–5) | Alumni Hall (1,344); Providence, RI |
| February 7, 2024; 8:00 p.m., FS1 | | Georgetown | W 52–38 | 18–5 (7–5) | Al McGuire Center (1,202); Milwaukee, WI |
| February 10, 2024; 2:00 p.m., FOX | | Villanova | L 52–55 | 18–6 (7–6) | Al McGuire Center (1,639); Milwaukee, WI |
| February 13, 2024; 7:00 p.m., FloSports | | at DePaul | W 69–58 | 19–6 (8–6) | Wintrust Arena (1,029); Chicago, IL |
| February 20, 2024; 7:00 p.m., FloSports | | Seton Hall | W 68–62 | 20–6 (9–6) | Al McGuire Center (1,398); Milwaukee, WI |
| February 24, 2024; 1:00 p.m., FloSports | | at Xavier | W 86–60 | 21–6 (10–6) | Cintas Center (412); Cincinnati, OH |
| February 27, 2024; 7:30 p.m., FS1 | | St. John's | L 50–56 | 21–7 (10–7) | Al McGuire Center (2,323); Milwaukee, WI |
| March 2, 2024; 2:00 p.m., FloSports | | at Butler | W 74–52 | 22–7 (11–7) | Hinkle Fieldhouse (1,780); Indianapolis, IN |
Big East Women's Tournament
| March 9, 2024; 1:30 p.m., FS2 | (5) | vs. (4) Villanova; Quarterfinals | W 50–48 | 23–7 | Mohegan Sun Arena; Montville, CT |
| March 10, 2024; 1:30 p.m., FS1 | (5) | vs. (1) No. 9 UConn; Semifinals | L 29–58 | 23–8 | Mohegan Sun Arena; Montville, CT |
NCAA Tournament
| March 23, 2024*; 3:45 p.m., ESPNU | (10 A1) | vs. (7 A1) Ole Miss; First Round | L 55–67 | 23–9 | Purcell Pavilion (9,149); South Bend, IN |
*Non-conference game. ^{#}Rankings from AP Poll. (#) Tournament seedings in parentheses. A1=Albany 1. All times are in Central Time.

== Rankings ==
Ranking movements Legend: ██ Increase in ranking ██ Decrease in ranking — = Not ranked RV = Received votes
| | Week | | | | | | | | | | | | | | | | | | | | |
| Poll | Pre | 1 | 2 | 3 | 4 | 5 | 6 | 7 | 8 | 9 | 10 | 11 | 12 | 13 | 14 | 15 | 16 | 17 | 18 | 19 | Final |
|---|---|---|---|---|---|---|---|---|---|---|---|---|---|---|---|---|---|---|---|---|---|
| AP | — | RV | RV | 23 | 19 | 19 | 18 | 18 | 19 | 23 | 22 | RV | RV | — | — | — | — | — | — | — | Not released |
| Coaches | RV | RV | RV | 23 | 19 | 19 | 18 | 18 | 20 | 23 | 22 | RV | RV | RV | — | — | — | — | — | — | |

== See also ==
- 2023–24 Marquette Golden Eagles men's basketball team
