= 2023–24 Georgetown Hoyas women's basketball team =

American college basketball season

2023–24 Georgetown Hoyas women's basketball

WBIT, Second Round
- Conference: Big East Conference
- Record: 23–12 (9–9 Big East)
- Head coach: Darnell Haney (interim)
- Assistant coaches: Kelly Mazzante; Mariya Moore
- Home arena: McDonough Arena

2023–24 Big East women's basketball standings
	Conf.				Overall
Team	W		L	PCT	W		L	PCT
No. 3 UConn †	18	–	0	1.000	33	–	6	.846
No. 23 Creighton	15	–	3	.833	26	–	6	.813
St. John's	11	–	7	.611	18	–	15	.545
Villanova	11	–	7	.611	22	–	13	.629
Marquette	11	–	7	.611	23	–	9	.719
Georgetown	9	–	9	.500	23	–	12	.657
Seton Hall	8	–	10	.444	17	–	15	.531
Butler	6	–	12	.333	15	–	17	.469
Providence	6	–	12	.333	13	–	21	.382
DePaul	4	–	14	.222	12	–	20	.375
Xavier	0	–	18	.000	1	–	27	.036
† 2024 Big East tournament winner Rankings from AP poll

The 2023–24 Georgetown Hoyas women's basketball team represented Georgetown University during the 2023–24 NCAA Division I women's basketball season. The Hoyas, led by interim head coach Darnell Haney, played their home games at McDonough Arena in Washington, D.C. as a member of the Big East Conference.

== Previous season ==
The Hoyas finished the 2022–23 season 14–17, 6–14 in Big East play to finish in a tie for eighth place. As the #9 seed in the Big East tournament, they defeated #8 seed Butler in the first round, before falling to top-seeded and eventual tournament champions UConn in the quarterfinals.

On March 13, 2023, the school announced that head coach James Howard's contract would not be renewed, ending his six-year tenure. On April 11, Georgia Tech associate head coach Tasha Butts was named the team's next head coach. On September 21, the school announced that Butts would be taking a leave of absence, in order to focus on her ongoing battle with breast cancer, with associate head coach Darnell Haney being named interim head coach in her absence. On October 23, it was announced that Butts had died at the age of 41, after a two-year battle with breast cancer.

== Roster ==
2023–24 Georgetown Hoyas women's basketball team
Players
Coaches

Pos.	#	Name	Height	Year	Previous school	Hometown
G	0	Yasmin Ott	5 ft 7 in (1.7 m)	Sr	Little Rock Christian Academy	Little Rock, Arkansas
G	1	Kelsey Ransom	5 ft 10 in (1.78 m)	Sr	Bishop Ahr High School	South River, New Jersey
G	2	Teaghan Flaherty	5 ft 10 in (1.78 m)	Sr	Rye High School	Rye, New York
G	3	Victoria Rivera	6 ft 0 in (1.83 m)	So	Dobie High School	Pasadena, Texas
G	4	Alex Cowan	5 ft 7 in (1.7 m)	GS	Wagner	Bowie, Maryland
G	5	Modesti McConnell	5 ft 7 in (1.7 m)	So	Casady School	Edmond, Oklahoma
F	10	Mya Bembry	6 ft 1 in (1.85 m)	GS	Seton Hall	West Orange, New Jersey
F	15	Brianna Scott	6 ft 4 in (1.93 m)	Jr	South Lakes High School	Reston, Virginia
C	21	Ariel Jenkins	6 ft 3 in (1.91 m)	Jr	Stuart Country Day School	Piscataway, New Jersey
F	24	Mayla Ham	5 ft 11 in (1.8 m)	Fr	Wayne Memorial High School	Detroit, Michigan
F	25	Kaliyah Myricks	6 ft 2 in (1.88 m)	Jr	George School	Hammonton, New Jersey
F	33	Graceann Bennett	6 ft 3 in (1.91 m)	GS	Lake George High School	Lake George, New York
F	35	Jada Claude	6 ft 0 in (1.83 m)	Sr	Morehead State	Fayetteville, Georgia

Head coach

- Darnell Haney (interim) (Florida A&M)

Assistant coach(es)

- Kelly Mazzante (Penn State)
- Mariya Moore (USC)

Legend

- (C) Team captain
- (S) Suspended
- (I) Ineligible
- (W) Walk-on
- Injured
- Current redshirt

Roster
Last update: January 1, 2024

== Schedule and results ==
Date time, TV	Rank^{#}	Opponent^{#}	Result	Record	High points	High rebounds	High assists	Site (attendance) city, state
Regular season
November 6, 2023*; 7:00 pm, FloHoops		Maryland Eastern Shore	W 61–50	1–0	19 – Ransom	12 – Scott	4 – 2 Tied	McDonough Arena (1,503); Washington, D.C.
November 9, 2023*; 7:00 pm, ESPN+		at Temple	W 68–45	2–0	16 – Ransom	8 – 2 Tied	5 – Ransom	Liacouras Center (1,117); Philadelphia, PA
November 12, 2023*; 2:00 pm, FloHoops		Brown	L 43–45	2–1	12 – Ransom	8 – Ransom	4 – Cowan	McDonough Arena (417); Washington, D.C.
November 17, 2023*; 7:00 pm, FloHoops		Fairleigh Dickinson	W 60–45	3–1	12 – Ransom	7 – Ransom	6 – Ransom	McDonough Arena (283); Washington, D.C.
November 24, 2023*; 9:00 pm, ESPN+		at Pepperdine	W 59–40	4–1	15 – Ransom	8 – Bennett	7 – Cowan	Firestone Fieldhouse (173); Malibu, CA
November 26, 2023*; 5:00 pm, ESPN+		at Cal State Fullerton	W 65–55	5–1	20 – Ransom	8 – 2 Tied	3 – 2 Tied	Titan Gym (287); Fullerton, CA
November 30, 2023*; 7:00 pm, FloHoops		Howard	W 45–43	6–1	12 – Ransom	14 – Ransom	4 – Ransom	McDonough Arena (451); Washington, D.C.
December 3, 2023*; 4:00 pm, B1G		at Northwestern	W 82–58	7–1	16 – 2 Tied	8 – Scott	6 – Cowan	Welsh–Ryan Arena (1,587); Evanston, IL
December 5, 2023*; 6:00 pm, ESPN+		at Colgate	W 61–40	8–1	21 – Scott	8 – 2 Tied	4 – Cowan	Cotterell Court (181); Hamilton, NY
December 17, 2023*; 2:00 pm, FloHoops		Wake Forest	W 60–44	9–1	22 – Ransom	8 – Scott	5 – Bembry	McDonough Arena (783); Washington, D.C.
December 20, 2023; 11:00 am, FloHoops		Seton Hall	L 49–57	9–2 (0–1)	15 – Scott	11 – Bennett	5 – Ransom	McDonough Arena (697); Washington, D.C.
December 28, 2023*; 7:00 pm, ESPN+		at Kennesaw State	W 57–55	10–2	11 – Jenkins	8 – Bembry	3 – Ransom	KSU Convocation Center (970); Kennesaw, GA
December 31, 2023; 5:00 pm, FloHoops		at DePaul	W 66–62	11–2 (1–1)	23 – Ransom	10 – Bennett	8 – Ransom	Wintrust Arena (1,167); Chicago, IL
January 3, 2024; 7:00 pm, FloHoops		at Butler	W 60–55	12–2 (2–1)	20 – Bennett	8 – Bennett	3 – Ransom	Hinkle Fieldhouse (892); Indianapolis, IN
January 7, 2024; 1:30 pm, SNY		No. 12 UConn	L 55–83	12–3 (2–2)	13 – Bennett	12 – Bennett	3 – 3 Tied	Entertainment and Sports Arena (2,937); Washington, D.C.
January 10, 2024; 11:30 am, FloHoops		at Villanova	L 51–53 ^{OT}	12–4 (2–3)	13 – Tied	13 – Scott	7 – Ransom	Finneran Pavilion (1,059); Villanova, PA
January 17, 2024; 7:00 pm, FloHoops		at Providence	W 73–71	13–4 (3–3)	25 – Ransom	7 – Rivera	5 – Ransom	Alumni Hall (644); Providence, RI
January 20, 2024; 2:00 pm, FloHoops		Xavier	W 77–49	14–4 (4–3)	18 – Bennett	8 – Bennett	6 – Ransom	McDonough Arena (989); Washington, D.C.
January 24, 2024; 7:00 pm, FloHoops		No. 21 Creighton	L 72–77	14–5 (4–4)	17 – Scott	7 – Tied	6 – Ransom	McDonough Arena (522); Washington, D.C.
January 28, 2024; 2:00 pm, FloHoops		at St. John's	L 56–57	14–6 (4–5)	19 – Ransom	6 – Tied	7 – Ransom	Carnesecca Arena (698); Queens, NY
January 31, 2024; 7:00 pm, FloHoops		at Seton Hall	L 54–71	14–7 (4–6)	12 – Bembry	7 – Scott	8 – Cowan	Walsh Gymnasium (919); South Orange, NJ
February 4, 2024; 2:00 pm, FloHoops		DePaul	W 44–42	15–7 (5–6)	12 – Tied	13 – Bennett	3 – Ransom	McDonough Arena (738); Washington, D.C.
February 7, 2024; 9:00 pm, FS1		at Marquette	L 38–52	15–8 (5–7)	7 – Bennett	8 – Bennett	3 – Cowan	Al McGuire Center (1,202); Milwaukee, WI
February 10, 2024; 7:00 pm, FloHoops		Providence	W 54–44	16–8 (6–7)	22 – Ransom	8 – Bennett	2 – Tied	McDonough Arena (621); Washington, D.C.
February 13, 2024; 11:00 am, FloHoops		Villanova	L 47–62	16–9 (6–8)	13 – Jenkins	8 – Jenkins	4 – Ransom	McDonough Arena (632); Washington, D.C.
February 16, 2024; 7:00 pm, SNY		at No. 15 UConn	L 44–85	16–10 (6–9)	16 – Rivera	5 – Ransom	4 – Bennett	Harry A. Gampel Pavilion (10,299); Storrs, CT
February 20, 2024; 7:00 pm, FloHoops		St. John's	W 51–43	17–10 (7–9)	21 – Scott	9 – Scott	6 – Randsom	McDonough Arena (322); Washington, D.C.
February 24, 2024; 2:00 pm, FloHoops		Butler	W 70–63	18–10 (8–9)	31 – Ransom	9 – Bennett	5 – Ransom	McDonough Arena (919); Washington, D.C.
March 2, 2024; 2:00 pm, FloHoops		at Xavier	W 66–46	19–10 (9–9)	18 – Rivera	9 – Bembry	6 – Ransom	Cintas Center (840); Cincinnati, OH
Big East tournament
March 8, 2024; 4:00 pm, FloHoops	(6)	vs. (11) Xavier; First Round	W 62–40	20–10	11 – Scott	7 – Bennett	6 – Ransom	Mohegan Sun Arena (4,898); Uncasville, CT
March 9, 2024; 9:30 pm, FS2	(6)	vs. (3) St. John's; Quarterfinals	W 53–44	21–10	16 – Bennett	8 – Scott	5 – Ransom	Mohegan Sun Arena; Uncasville, CT
March 10, 2024; 5:00 pm, FS1	(6)	vs. (2) No. 21 Creighton; Semifinals	W 55–46	22–10	14 – Ransom	11 – Bennett	6 – Ransom	Mohegan Sun Arena; Uncasville, CT
March 11, 2024; 7:00 pm, FS1	(6)	vs. (1) No. 10 UConn; Championship	L 42–78	22–11	12 – Tied	6 – Ransom	4 – Bennett	Mohegan Sun Arena (7,918); Uncasville, CT
WBIT
March 21, 2024*; 10:00 pm, ESPN+		at (2) Washington; First Round	W 64–56	23–11	28 – Ransom	8 – Bembry	4 – Bennett	Alaska Airlines Arena (699); Seattle, WA
March 24, 2024*; 3:00 pm, ESPN+		at (3) Tulsa; Second Round	L 61–73	23–12	18 – Ransom	8 – Jenkins	5 – Ransom	Reynolds Center (1,464); Tulsa, OK
*Non-conference game. ^{#}Rankings from AP Poll. (#) Tournament seedings in parentheses. All times are in Eastern.
