= 2023–24 UConn Huskies women's basketball team =

Intercollegiate basketball season

2023–24 UConn Huskies women's basketball

Big East regular season & tournament champions

NCAA tournament, Final Four
- Conference: Big East Conference

Ranking
- Coaches: No. 3
- AP: No. 3
- Record: 33–6 (18–0 Big East)
- Head coach: Geno Auriemma (39th season)
- Associate head coach: Chris Dailey (39th season)
- Assistant coaches: Jamelle Elliott (4th season); Morgan Valley (3rd season); Tonya Cardoza (1st season); Ben Kantor (1st season)
- Home arena: Harry A. Gampel Pavilion; XL Center

2023–24 Big East women's basketball standings
	Conf.				Overall
Team	W		L	PCT	W		L	PCT
No. 3 UConn †	18	–	0	1.000	33	–	6	.846
No. 23 Creighton	15	–	3	.833	26	–	6	.813
St. John's	11	–	7	.611	18	–	15	.545
Villanova	11	–	7	.611	22	–	13	.629
Marquette	11	–	7	.611	23	–	9	.719
Georgetown	9	–	9	.500	23	–	12	.657
Seton Hall	8	–	10	.444	17	–	15	.531
Butler	6	–	12	.333	15	–	17	.469
Providence	6	–	12	.333	13	–	21	.382
DePaul	4	–	14	.222	12	–	20	.375
Xavier	0	–	18	.000	1	–	27	.036
† 2024 Big East tournament winner Rankings from AP poll

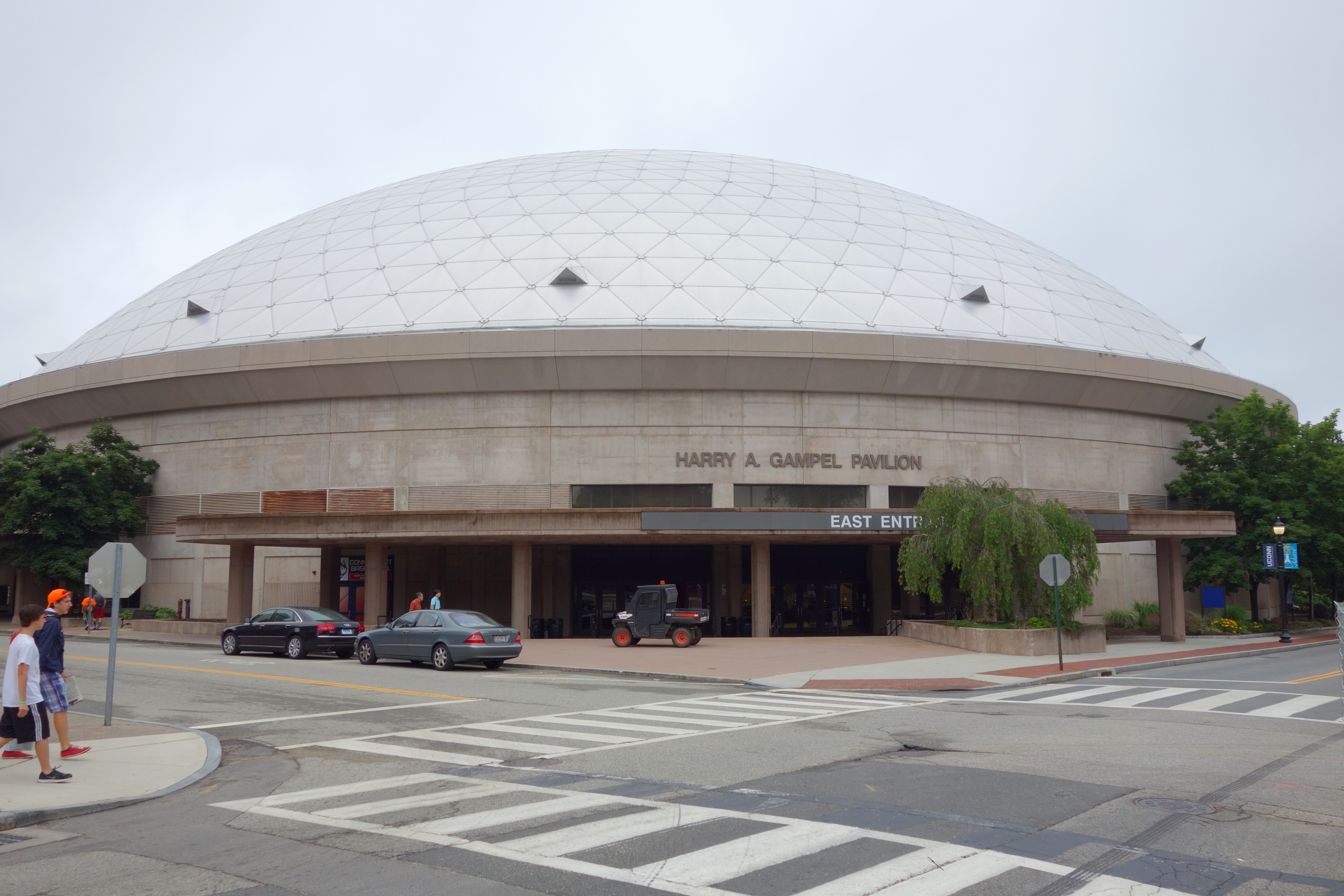
Harry A. Gampel Pavilion, where the Huskies played home games

The 2023–24 UConn Huskies women's basketball team represented the University of Connecticut (UConn) during the 2023–24 NCAA Division I women's basketball season. The Huskies, led by Hall of Fame head coach Geno Auriemma in his 39th season at UConn, split their home games between Harry A. Gampel Pavilion on their campus in Storrs, and the XL Center in Hartford. UConn is a member of the Big East Conference, which it rejoined in the 2020–21 season; it had been a member of the original Big East Conference from 1979 through 2013, and one of the original women's basketball teams in that conference in 1982. (Note: The settlement of the 2013 split of the Big East Conference resulted in the so-called "Catholic 7" purchasing the "Big East" name and reorganizing as a new conference. The original conference charter was retained by the Division I FBS football schools that now operate as the American Athletic Conference. As part of the settlement, the current Big East recognizes the competitive history of the original conference in all sports that it sponsors.)

UConn lost key players to injury early in the season and dropped several non-conference games. However, led by All-Americans Paige Bueckers and Aaliyah Edwards, the Huskies went undefeated in the Big East and then won the conference tournament. In the NCAA tournament, they advanced to the Final Four before losing to the Iowa Hawkeyes. UConn finished the season with a record of 33–6 and were ranked #3 in the final AP and Coaches polls.

== Previous season ==
The 2022–23 UConn Huskies began with season-ending injuries to All-American junior guard Paige Bueckers and freshman forward Ice Brady. The team played well early in the season, but injuries to Azzi Fudd, Dorka Juhász, and Caroline Ducharme often forced starters like Nika Mühl, Aaliyah Edwards, and Aubrey Griffin to play full games and graduate transfer Lou Lopez Sénéchal to take on scoring responsibilities. Mühl ranked second among all NCAA women in assists during the season, UConn relying on her high energy and court vision to make Husky touches in the paint quick and decisive. With a light bench, Edwards, Mühl, Juhász, Lopez Sénéchal, and Griffin became a durable quintet in January; when Fudd and Ducharme returned, the team quickly improved. UConn dominated the Big East tournament. In the NCAA tournament, they advanced to their 29th consecutive Sweet Sixteen before being upset by a swarming Ohio State Buckeyes defense. This was the first time the Huskies failed to reach the Final Four since 2007 (not counting the COVID-disrupted 2019–20 season in which the NCAA tournament was not held).

== Offseason ==
=== Departures ===
The Huskies graduated senior starters Dorka Juhász and Lou Lopez Sénéchal from the 2022–23 roster, and both were drafted into the Women's National Basketball Association.

Name	Number	Pos.	Height	Year	Hometown	Reason for departure
Lou Lopez Sénéchal	11	G	6'1"	Graduate Student	Grenoble, France	Drafted by the WNBA's Dallas Wings
Dorka Juhász	14	F	6'5"	Graduate Student	Pécs, Hungary	Drafted by the WNBA's Minnesota Lynx

=== Injuries ===
Tour of Huskies' team facilities
- UCONN Women's Basketball Virtual Tour

Freshman center Jana El Alfy suffered an achilles injury in August while playing for the Egyptian national U19 team and later underwent corrective surgery.

=== Recruiting ===
ESPN evaluated UConn's class of 2023 as the fourth-ranked group in the country, behind LSU, South Carolina, and Arizona.

College recruiting
Name	Hometown	School	Height	Weight	Commit date
Kamorea "KK" Arnold; PG	Germantown, WI	Germantown High School	5 ft 9 in (1.75 m)	N/A	
Kamorea "KK" Arnold; PG	Recruit ratings: ESPN: (97)				
Ashlynn Shade; G	Noblesville, IN	La Lumiere School	5 ft 10 in (1.78 m)	N/A	
Ashlynn Shade; G	Recruit ratings: ESPN: (96)				
Qadence Samuels; W	Forestville, MD	Bishop McNamara High School	6 ft 2 in (1.88 m)	N/A	
Qadence Samuels; W	Recruit ratings: ESPN: (94)				
Jana El-Alfy; F	Cairo, Egypt	Al Ahly Sporting Club	6 ft 4 in (1.93 m)	N/A	
Jana El-Alfy; F	Recruit ratings: No ratings found				
Overall recruit ranking: ESPN: 4
Note: In many cases, Scout, Rivals, 247Sports, On3, and ESPN may conflict in their listings of height and weight.; In these cases, the average was taken. ESPN grades are on a 100-point scale.; Sources: "2023 Player Commits". ESPN. Archived from the original on November 13, 2022.

==== Recruiting class of 2024 ====
On December 3, 2022, UConn received a verbal commitment from five-star guard Allie Ziebell. Fellow five-star guard Morgan Cheli committed to UConn soon after. In November 2023, ESPN ranked the Huskies' 2024 class as the sixth-best in the country. On April 6, 2024, the #1 player in the class of 2024, five-star forward Sarah Strong, also committed to UConn.

College recruiting (2024)
Name	Hometown	School	Height	Weight	Commit date
Sarah Strong; F	Fuquay-Varina, NC	Grace Christian School	6 ft 2 in (1.88 m)	N/A	
Sarah Strong; F	Recruit ratings: ESPN: (98)				
Allie Ziebell; G	Neenah, WI	Neenah High School	5 ft 11 in (1.80 m)	N/A	
Allie Ziebell; G	Recruit ratings: ESPN: (98)				
Morgan Cheli; G	San Jose, CA	Archbishop Mitty High School	6 ft 2 in (1.88 m)	N/A	
Morgan Cheli; G	Recruit ratings: ESPN: (96)				
Overall recruit ranking: ESPN: 6
Note: In many cases, Scout, Rivals, 247Sports, On3, and ESPN may conflict in their listings of height and weight.; In these cases, the average was taken. ESPN grades are on a 100-point scale.; Sources: "2024 Player Commits". ESPN. Archived from the original on November 11, 2023.

==== Recruiting class of 2025 ====
College recruiting (2025)
Name	Hometown	School	Height	Weight	Commit date
Kelis Fisher; PG	Baltimore, MD	IMG Academy	5 ft 8 in (1.73 m)	N/A	
Kelis Fisher; PG	Recruit ratings: ESPN: (96)				
Gandy Malou-Mamel; C	Limerick, Ireland	Gill St. Bernard's School	6 ft 6 in (1.98 m)	N/A	
Gandy Malou-Mamel; C	Recruit ratings: No ratings found				
Overall recruit ranking:
Note: In many cases, Scout, Rivals, 247Sports, On3, and ESPN may conflict in their listings of height and weight.; In these cases, the average was taken. ESPN grades are on a 100-point scale.; Sources: "2025 Player Commits". ESPN. Archived from the original on November 11, 2023.

=== Coaching ===
Hall of Fame head coach Geno Auriemma and Hall of Fame associate head coach Chris Dailey returned for their 39th season. Assistant coach Jamelle Elliott was a UConn assistant coach from 1998 to 2009 and returned after a nine-year head coaching stint at Cincinnati. Assistant coach Morgan Valley was the head coach of the Hartford Hawks when hired by the Huskies. Elliott and Valley are both former UConn players. Tonya Cardoza, another former Huskies assistant, returned to UConn in June after serving as Temple's head coach for 15 years. Also in June, UConn announced Ben Kantor was promoted to assistant coach from his previous staff position serving as the team's video coordinator since 2015. On February 7, 2024, this year's squad defeated Seton Hall for Auriemma's 1200th career win. He became only the third NCAA basketball coach to reach that mark.

== Season summary ==
Even after graduating two WNBA draftees, the Huskies entered the season with six reliable and tested starters, led by seniors Nika Mühl, Aubrey Griffin, and 2023 All-American Aaliyah Edwards. Juniors Azzi Fudd, Caroline Ducharme, and 2021 All-American Paige Bueckers returned in the backcourt. UConn were ranked #2 in the preseason AP and Coaches polls.

However, the Huskies' injury problems of the previous few seasons continued to plague them. Freshman center Jana El Alfy got hurt during the offseason. Sophomore forward Ayanna Patterson suffered a knee injury in December and never played a game. Fudd only played two games before suffering a non-contact injury in practice in November. She was diagnosed with an ACL injury and was out for the rest of the season. Ducharme, who had previously struggled with recurring neck issues, only played four games. On January 23, she announced that she would not be returning to play this season.

UConn's injuries, combined with a tough non-conference schedule, led to three losses to quality opponents in their first seven games of the season. The Huskies then went on a 13-game winning streak as they started their Big East schedule, though they became even more shorthanded when Griffin experienced an ACL tear in her left knee during the Creighton game on January 3. For most of the season, UConn ran out a starting lineup of forward Edwards, guards Bueckers and Mühl, and freshmen guards KK Arnold and Ashlynn Shade. Freshmen forward Ice Brady and guard Qadence Samuels were the primary substitutes on a very short bench. Forward Amari DeBerry and guard Inês Bettencourt provided spot minutes when needed.

With Bueckers leading the team in points, Edwards leading in rebounds, and Mühl leading in assists, UConn went 18–0 in the Big East to win the conference regular season title. They never dropped out of the top 25 in the AP and Coaches polls. During this time, they lost two more games to ranked non-conference opponents, but they won all of their Big East games by at least 15 points and had an overall record of 26–5 going into the postseason. Bueckers was named the Big East Player of the Year.

UConn entered the Big East tournament in March on a six-game winning streak. DeBerry was ruled out for the rest of the season after going into concussion protocol, and in the quarterfinals, Edwards suffered a broken nose. This left the Huskies with just seven players available for the rest of the Big East tournament. UConn went on to win the tournament anyway to clinch a berth in the NCAA tournament. It was their 11th straight conference tournament championship. Bueckers and Edwards were both named to All-American teams.

In the NCAA tournament, UConn were the number three seed in their region. They won their first four games of the tournament with Bueckers named the most outstanding player of the region. In the Final Four, the Caitlin Clark-led Iowa Hawkeyes defeated the Huskies; the game was watched by a college basketball record 14.4 million viewers on ESPN. UConn finished the season with an overall record of 33–6 and were ranked #3 in the final AP and Coaches polls. Afterward, Edwards and Mühl were selected in the 2024 WNBA draft. Mühl finished her UConn career as the program's all-time assists leader.

== Roster ==
2023–24 UConn Huskies women's basketball team
Players
Coaches

Pos.	#	Name	Height	Year	Previous school	Hometown
G	2	KK Arnold	5 ft 9 in (1.75 m)	Fr	Germantown	Germantown, WI
F	3	Aaliyah Edwards	6 ft 3 in (1.91 m)	Sr	Crestwood Preparatory	Kingston, Ontario
G	4	Qadence Samuels	6 ft 0 in (1.83 m)	Fr	Bishop McNamara	Forestville, MD
G	5	Paige Bueckers	5 ft 11 in (1.8 m)	RS Jr	Hopkins	Hopkins, MN
G	10	Nika Mühl	5 ft 10 in (1.78 m)	Sr	III. Gimnazija Zagreb	Zagreb, Croatia
G	12	Ashlynn Shade	5 ft 10 in (1.78 m)	Fr	La Lumiere	Noblesville, IN
G	21	Inês Bettencourt	5 ft 9 in (1.75 m)	So	Clube União Sportiva	São Miguel, Portugal
C	24	Jana El-Alfy (injured) (redshirt)	6 ft 5 in (1.96 m)	Fr	Al Ahly SC	Cairo, Egypt
F	25	Ice Brady	6 ft 3 in (1.91 m)	RS Fr	Cathedral Catholic	San Diego, CA
G	33	Caroline Ducharme (injured) (redshirt)	6 ft 2 in (1.88 m)	Jr	Noble & Greenough	Milton, MA
F	34	Ayanna Patterson (injured) (redshirt)	6 ft 2 in (1.88 m)	So	Homestead	Fort Wayne, IN
G	35	Azzi Fudd (injured) (redshirt)	5 ft 11 in (1.8 m)	Jr	St. John's College HS	Arlington, VA
F	42	Amari DeBerry (injured)	6 ft 6 in (1.98 m)	Jr	Williamsville South	Williamsville, NY
F	44	Aubrey Griffin (injured)	6 ft 1 in (1.85 m)	RS Sr	Ossining	Ossining, NY

Head coach

- Geno Auriemma (West Chester)

Assistant coach(es)

- Chris Dailey (Rutgers)
- Jamelle Elliott (Connecticut)
- Morgan Valley (Connecticut)
- Tonya Cardoza (Virginia)
- Ben Kantor (Illinois)

Legend

- (C) Team captain
- (S) Suspended
- (I) Ineligible
- (W) Walk-on
- Injured
- Current redshirt

Roster
Last update: March 13, 2024

== Schedule and results ==
Date time, TV	Rank^{#}	Opponent^{#}	Result	Record	High points	High rebounds	High assists	Site (attendance) city, state
Exhibition
November 4, 2023*; 1:00 pm, WWAX	No. 2	Southern Connecticut	W 97–38		18 – Fudd	10 – Edwards	7 – Bueckers	Harry A. Gampel Pavilion (9,664); Storrs, CT
Regular season
November 8, 2023*; 7:00 pm, SNY	No. 2	Dayton	W 102–58	1–0	23 – Edwards	9 – Edwards	7 – Arnold	XL Center (9,126); Hartford, CT
November 12, 2023*; 3:00 pm, ABC	No. 2	at NC State	L 81–92	1–1	27 – Bueckers	6 – Edwards	6 – Mühl	Reynolds Coliseum (5,500); Raleigh, NC
November 16, 2023*; 6:30 pm, FS1	No. 8	No. 20 Maryland	W 80–48	2–1	24 – Bueckers	13 – Griffin	5 – Tied	Harry A. Gampel Pavilion (10,299); Storrs, CT
November 19, 2023*; 5:00 pm, FS1	No. 8	at Minnesota	W 62–44	3–1	16 – Edwards	9 – Edwards	4 – Bueckers	Williams Arena (10,869); Minneapolis, MN
November 24, 2023*; 7:30 pm, FloHoops	No. 6	vs. No. 2 UCLA; Cayman Islands Classic	L 67–78	3–2	31 – Bueckers	7 – Griffin	3 – Tied	John Gray Gymnasium (300); George Town, Cayman Islands
November 25, 2023*; 7:30 pm, FloHoops	No. 6	vs. Kansas; Cayman Islands Classic	W 71–63	4–2	22 – Bueckers	8 – Griffin	6 – Mühl	John Gray Gymnasium (1,650); George Town, Cayman Islands
December 3, 2023*; 3:00 pm, ABC	No. 11	at No. 10 Texas; Jimmy V Classic	L 68–80	4–3	22 – Edwards	6 – Tied	4 – Bueckers	Moody Center (10,763); Austin, TX
December 6, 2023*; 7:00 pm, SNY	No. 17	Ball State	W 90–63	5–3	18 – Edwards	12 – Edwards	4 – Tied	Harry A. Gampel Pavilion (9,273); Storrs, CT
December 10, 2023*; 5:00 pm, ESPN	No. 17	vs. No. 24 North Carolina; Basketball Hall of Fame Women's Showcase	W 76–64	6–3	26 – Bueckers	11 – Edwards	6 – Mühl	Mohegan Sun Arena (8,428); Uncasville, CT
December 16, 2023*; 12:00 pm, FOX	No. 17	No. 18 Louisville	W 86–62	7–3	25 – Griffin	7 – Tied	10 – Mühl	XL Center (13,028); Hartford, CT
December 18, 2023; 7:00 pm, SNY	No. 17	Butler	W 88–62	8–3 (1–0)	22 – Shade	12 – Edwards	7 – Bueckers	XL Center (9,354); Hartford, CT
December 20, 2023*; 6:00 pm, FS2	No. 17	at Toronto Metropolitan	W 111–34	9–3	26 – Edwards	10 – Edwards	8 – Mühl	Mattamy Athletic Centre (2,734); Toronto, ON
December 31, 2023; 1:00 pm, SNY	No. 15	No. 18 Marquette	W 95–64	10–3 (2–0)	25 – Bueckers	12 – Edwards	7 – Mühl	XL Center (15,684); Hartford, CT
January 3, 2024; 7:00 pm, SNY	No. 12	at No. 21 Creighton	W 94–50	11–3 (3–0)	24 – Bueckers	11 – Edwards	7 – Tied	D. J. Sokol Arena (2,374); Omaha, NE
January 7, 2024; 1:30 pm, SNY	No. 12	at Georgetown	W 83–55	12–3 (4–0)	18 – Edwards	6 – Edwards	8 – Mühl	Entertainment and Sports Arena (2,937); Washington, D.C.
January 10, 2024; 6:30 pm, SNY	No. 13	Providence	W 85–41	13–3 (5–0)	17 – Shade	9 – Bueckers	13 – Mühl	XL Center (10,210); Hartford, CT
January 13, 2024; 2:00 pm, SNY	No. 13	at St. John's	W 92–49	14–3 (6–0)	22 – Bueckers	10 – Edwards	7 – Arnold	UBS Arena (2,858); Elmont, NY
January 17, 2024; 8:30 pm, SNY	No. 9	at Seton Hall	W 83–59	15–3 (7–0)	32 – Bueckers	9 – Edwards	10 – Mühl	Walsh Gymnasium (1,296); South Orange, NJ
January 20, 2024; 2:00 pm, SNY	No. 9	DePaul	W 88–51	16–3 (8–0)	21 – Shade	7 – Shade	7 – Mühl	Harry A. Gampel Pavilion (10,299); Storrs, CT
January 23, 2024; 7:00 pm, SNY	No. 8	at Marquette	W 84–59	17–3 (9–0)	26 – Bueckers	12 – Edwards	6 – Mühl	Al McGuire Center (3,585); Milwaukee, WI
January 27, 2024*; 8:00 pm, FOX	No. 8	No. 15 Notre Dame; Rivalry	L 67–82	17–4	23 – Edwards	11 – Edwards	3 – Tied	Harry A. Gampel Pavilion (10,299); Storrs, CT
January 31, 2024; 6:30 pm, SNY	No. 11	at Villanova	W 81–60	18–4 (10–0)	22 – Edwards	7 – Edwards	10 – Mühl	Finneran Pavilion (4,109); Villanova, PA
February 4, 2024; 3:00 pm, CBSSN	No. 11	St. John's	W 78–63	19–4 (11–0)	33 – Edwards	13 – Edwards	9 – Mühl	Harry A. Gampel Pavilion (10,299); Storrs, CT
February 7, 2024; 7:00 pm, SNY	No. 11	Seton Hall	W 67–34	20–4 (12–0)	18 – Edwards	15 – Edwards	6 – Mühl	XL Center (14,138); Hartford, CT
February 11, 2024*; 2:00 pm, ESPN	No. 11	at No. 1 South Carolina	L 65–83	20–5	20 – Tied	12 – Edwards	4 – Arnold	Colonial Life Arena (18,167); Columbia, SC
February 14, 2024; 7:00 pm, SNY	No. 15	at Xavier	W 86–40	21–5 (13–0)	20 – Bueckers	14 – Brady	11 – Mühl	Cintas Center (2,952); Cincinnati, OH
February 16, 2024; 7:00 pm, SNY	No. 15	Georgetown	W 85–44	22–5 (14–0)	26 – Edwards	16 – Edwards	8 – Bueckers	Harry A. Gampel Pavilion (10,299); Storrs, CT
February 19, 2024; 12:00 pm, FOX	No. 15	No. 21 Creighton	W 73–53	23–5 (15–0)	24 – Bueckers	9 – Shade	7 – Mühl	XL Center (15,684); Hartford, CT
February 25, 2024; 6:00 pm, CBSSN	No. 15	at DePaul	W 104–67	24–5 (16–0)	30 – Bueckers	17 – Edwards	8 – Mühl	Wintrust Arena (5,477); Chicago, IL
February 28, 2024; 7:00 pm, SNY	No. 10	Villanova	W 67–46	25–5 (17–0)	31 – Bueckers	11 – Edwards	6 – Mühl	Harry A. Gampel Pavilion (10,299); Storrs, CT
March 2, 2024; 7:00 pm, SNY	No. 10	at Providence	W 65–42	26–5 (18–0)	17 – Bueckers	7 – Tied	7 – Mühl	Alumni Hall (1,246); Providence, RI
Big East tournament
March 9, 2024; 12:00 pm, FS1	(1) No. 9	vs. (9) Providence; Quarterfinals	W 86–53	27–5	29 – Bueckers	9 – Bueckers	6 – Bueckers	Mohegan Sun Arena (8,524); Uncasville, CT
March 10, 2024; 2:30 pm, FS1	(1) No. 9	vs. (5) Marquette; Semifinals	W 58–29	28–5	27 – Bueckers	12 – Bueckers	5 – Mühl	Mohegan Sun Arena (8,003); Uncasville, CT
March 11, 2024; 7:00 pm, FS1	(1) No. 10	vs. (6) Georgetown; Championship	W 76–42	29–5	27 – Bueckers	8 – Brady	9 – Mühl	Mohegan Sun Arena (7,918); Uncasville, CT
NCAA tournament
March 23, 2024*; 1:00 pm, ABC	(3 P3) No. 10	(14 P3) Jackson State; First Round	W 86–64	30–5	28 – Bueckers	11 – Bueckers	7 – Tied	Harry A. Gampel Pavilion (10,299); Storrs, CT
March 25, 2024*; 6:00 pm, ESPN	(3 P3) No. 10	(6 P3) No. 22 Syracuse; Second Round/Rivalry	W 72–64	31–5	32 – Bueckers	11 – Edwards	6 – Bueckers	Harry A. Gampel Pavilion (10,299); Storrs, CT
March 30, 2024*; 8:00 pm, ESPN	(3 P3) No. 10	vs. (7 P3) Duke; Sweet Sixteen	W 53–45	32–5	24 – Bueckers	7 – Edwards	8 – Mühl	Moda Center (12,103); Portland, OR
April 1, 2024*; 9:15 pm, ESPN	(3 P3) No. 10	vs. (1 P3) No. 3 USC; Elite Eight	W 80–73	33–5	28 – Bueckers	10 – Bueckers	8 – Mühl	Moda Center (10,869); Portland, OR
April 5, 2024*; 9:30 pm, ESPN	(3 P3) No. 10	vs. (1 A2) No. 2 Iowa; Final Four	L 69–71	33–6	17 – Tied	8 – Edwards	7 – Mühl	Rocket Mortgage FieldHouse (18,284); Cleveland, OH
*Non-conference game. ^{#}Rankings from AP Poll. (#) Tournament seedings in parentheses. P3=Portland 3. A2=Albany 2. All times are in Eastern Time.

== Rankings ==
Ranking movements Legend: ██ Increase in ranking ██ Decrease in ranking ( ) = First-place votes
	Week																				
Poll	Pre	1	2	3	4	5	6	7	8	9	10	11	12	13	14	15	16	17	18	19	Final
AP	2 (1)	8	6	11	17	17	17	15	12	13	9	8	11	11	15	15	10	9	10	10	3
Coaches	2 (3)	8	7	12	17	18	17	17	15	14	10	8	10	9	14	13	10	9	7	7	3

== Player statistics ==
Player	Games Played	Minutes	Field Goals	Three Pointers	Free Throws	Rebounds	Assists	Blocks	Steals	Points
Nika Mühl	39	1252	103	51	12	156	253	6	50	269
Paige Bueckers	39	1244	317	84	136	202	150	53	86	854
Ashlynn Shade	38	1188	167	64	21	133	55	4	37	419
KK Arnold	39	1182	128	30	61	121	123	2	90	347
Aaliyah Edwards	37	1126	261	0	130	341	76	36	62	652
Ice Brady	39	678	71	6	27	127	41	16	18	175
Qadence Samuels	36	443	68	35	9	93	23	10	16	180
Aubrey Griffin	14	308	47	3	36	84	20	13	21	133
Inês Bettencourt	28	156	8	0	2	21	16	2	9	18
Amari DeBerry	23	104	9	0	4	16	6	8	2	22
Azzi Fudd	2	61	8	4	2	5	5	0	2	22
Caroline Ducharme	4	58	5	2	4	8	2	1	3	16

== Awards and honors ==
- Paige Bueckers
  - Associated Press first-team All-American
  - United States Basketball Writers Association first-team All-American
  - Women's Basketball Coaches Association All-American
  - Big East Player of the Year
  - First-team All-Big East
  - Big East tournament Most Outstanding Player
- Aaliyah Edwards
  - United States Basketball Writers Association second-team All-American
  - Women's Basketball Coaches Association All-American
  - First-team All-Big East
- Ashlynn Shade
  - Big East Freshman of the Year
  - Big East All-Freshman Team
- Nika Mühl
  - Second-team All-Big East
- KK Arnold
  - Big East All-Freshman Team
- Geno Auriemma
  - Big East Coach of the Year

== See also ==
- 2023–24 UConn Huskies men's basketball team
