= 2024 Big East women's basketball tournament =

- Classification: Division I
- Season: 2023–24
- Teams: 11
- Site: Mohegan Sun Arena; Uncasville, Connecticut
- Champions: UConn (22nd title)
- Winning coach: Geno Auriemma (22nd title)
- MVP: Paige Bueckers (UConn)
- Attendance: 34,965
- Television: FloSports, FS1, FS2

2023–24 Big East women's basketball standings
	Conf.				Overall
Team	W		L	PCT	W		L	PCT
No. 3 UConn †	18	–	0	1.000	33	–	6	.846
No. 23 Creighton	15	–	3	.833	26	–	6	.813
St. John's	11	–	7	.611	18	–	15	.545
Villanova	11	–	7	.611	22	–	13	.629
Marquette	11	–	7	.611	23	–	9	.719
Georgetown	9	–	9	.500	23	–	12	.657
Seton Hall	8	–	10	.444	17	–	15	.531
Butler	6	–	12	.333	15	–	17	.469
Providence	6	–	12	.333	13	–	21	.382
DePaul	4	–	14	.222	12	–	20	.375
Xavier	0	–	18	.000	1	–	27	.036
† 2024 Big East tournament winner Rankings from AP poll

The 2024 Big East women's basketball tournament was the postseason women's basketball tournament for the Big East Conference, held March 8–11, 2024, at Mohegan Sun Arena in Uncasville, Connecticut. After four days of play, the #1 seed UConn Huskies defeated the #8 seed Georgetown Hoyas 78–42, thereby receiving the conference's automatic bid to the 2024 NCAA tournament.

== Seeds ==
All 11 Big East schools are scheduled to participate in the tournament. Teams will be seeded by the conference record with tie-breaking procedures to determine the seeds for teams with identical conference records. The top five teams will receive first-round byes. Seeding for the tournament will be determined at the close of the regular conference season.

Seed	School	Conference	Tiebreaker
1	UConn	18–0	
2	Creighton	15–3	
3	St. John's	11–7	1–0 vs. Villanova
4	Villanova	11–7	0–1 vs. St. John's
5	Marquette	11–7	0–4 vs. St. John's/Villanova
6	Georgetown	9–9	
7	Seton Hall	8–10	
8	Butler	6–12	1–1 vs. St. John's
9	Providence	6–12	0–2 vs. St. John's
10	DePaul	4–14	
11	Xavier	0–18	

== Schedule ==
Game	Time	Matchup	Score	Television	Attendance
First round – Friday, March 8
1	11:00 a.m.	No. 8 Butler vs. No. 9 Providence	60–75	BEDN	4,898
2	1:30 p.m.	No. 7 Seton Hall vs. No. 10 DePaul	71–64	BEDN	4,898
3	4:00 pm	No. 6 Georgetown vs. No. 11 Xavier	62–40	BEDN	4,898
Quarterfinals – Saturday, March 9
4	12:00 pm	No. 1 UConn vs. No. 9 Providence	86–53	FS1	8,524
5	2:30 pm	No. 4 Villanova vs. No. 5 Marquette	48–50	FS2	8,524
6	7:00 pm	No. 2 Creighton vs. No. 7 Seton Hall	72–65	FS2	5,622
7	9:30 pm	No. 3 St. John's vs. No. 6 Georgetown	44–53	FS2	5,622
Semifinals – Sunday, March 10
8	2:30 pm	No. 1 UConn vs. No. 5 Marquette	58–29	FS1	8,003
9	5:00 pm	No. 2 Creighton vs. No. 6 Georgetown	46–55	FS1	8,003
Championship – Monday, March 11
10	7:00 p.m.	No. 1 UConn vs. No. 6 Georgetown	78–42	FS1	7,918
Game times in Eastern Time. Rankings denote tournament seed.

== Bracket ==
First round Friday, March 8 FloSports
8	Butler	60
9	Providence	75
7	Seton Hall	71
10	DePaul	64
6	Georgetown	62
11	Xavier	40

Quarterfinals; Saturday, March 9 FS1/FS2
1	UConn	86
9	Providence	53
4	Villanova	48
5	Marquette	50
2	Creighton	72
7	Seton Hall	65
3	St. John's	44
6	Georgetown	53

Semifinals; Sunday, March 10; FS1
1	UConn	58
5	Marquette	29
2	Creighton	46
6	Georgetown	55

Championship; Monday, March 11; FS1
1	UConn	78
6	Georgetown	42
