= 2023–24 Creighton Bluejays women's basketball team =

Intercollegiate basketball season

2023–24 Creighton Bluejays women's basketball

NCAA tournament, Second Round
- Conference: Big East

Ranking
- Coaches: No. 19
- AP: No. 23
- Record: 26–6 (15–3 Big East)
- Head coach: Jim Flanery (22nd season)
- Assistant coaches: Carli Berger; Jordann Reese; Chevelle Saunsoci
- Home arena: D. J. Sokol Arena

2023–24 Big East women's basketball standings
	Conf.				Overall
Team	W		L	PCT	W		L	PCT
No. 3 UConn †	18	–	0	1.000	33	–	6	.846
No. 23 Creighton	15	–	3	.833	26	–	6	.813
St. John's	11	–	7	.611	18	–	15	.545
Villanova	11	–	7	.611	22	–	13	.629
Marquette	11	–	7	.611	23	–	9	.719
Georgetown	9	–	9	.500	23	–	12	.657
Seton Hall	8	–	10	.444	17	–	15	.531
Butler	6	–	12	.333	15	–	17	.469
Providence	6	–	12	.333	13	–	21	.382
DePaul	4	–	14	.222	12	–	20	.375
Xavier	0	–	18	.000	1	–	27	.036
† 2024 Big East tournament winner Rankings from AP poll

The 2023–24 Creighton Bluejays women's basketball team represented Creighton University in the 2023–24 NCAA Division I women's basketball season. The Bluejays, led by 22nd-year head coach Jim Flanery, played their home games at D. J. Sokol Arena and were members of the Big East Conference.

== Previous season ==
The Bluejays finished the season at 22–9 and 15–5 in Big East play to finish in third place. They defeated Seton Hall in the quarterfinals of the Big East women's tournament before losing to Villanova. They received an at-large bid to the NCAA Women's Tournament as a 6th seed in Greensville region 2, where they were upset by 11th seed Mississippi State.

== Offseason ==
=== Departures ===
Name	Number	Pos.	Height	Year	Hometown	Reason for departure
Rachel Saunders	13	G	5'9"	GS senior	Iowa City, IA	Graduated
Carly Bachelor	22	G/F	6'0"	Senior	Topeka, KS	Graduated

==== Recruiting ====
There was no recruiting class of 2023.

== Roster ==
2023–24 Creighton Bluejays women's basketball team
Players
Coaches

Pos.	#	Name	Height	Year	Previous school	Hometown
G	2	Kennedy Townsend	5 ft 10 in (1.78 m)	So	Park Hill	Kansas City, MO
G	4	Lexi Unruh	6 ft 1 in (1.85 m)	RS Fr	Sioux Falls Christian	Sioux Falls, SD
G	11	Kiani Lockett	5 ft 8 in (1.73 m)	So	Minnetonka	Minneapolis, MN
G	12	Jayme Horan	5 ft 10 in (1.78 m)	Sr	Millard South	Omaha, NE
F	14	Mallory Brake	6 ft 0 in (1.83 m)	Sr	Hastings	Hastings, MN
G	15	Lauren Jensen	5 ft 10 in (1.78 m)	Sr	Lakeville North; Iowa	Lakeville, MN
G	21	Molly Mogensen	5 ft 7 in (1.7 m)	Sr	Farmington	Farmington, MN
G	23	Brittany Harshaw	6 ft 1 in (1.85 m)	RS Fr	Andover Central	Andover, KS
G/F	30	Morgan Maly	6 ft 1 in (1.85 m)	Sr	Crete	Crete, NE
F	31	Emma Ronsiak	6 ft 1 in (1.85 m)	Sr	O'Gorman	Sioux Falls, SD
G	32	McKayla Miller	6 ft 1 in (1.85 m)	Fr	Cimarron	Cimarron, KS

Head coach

- Jim Flanery (Creighton)

Assistant coach(es)

- Carli Berger (Creighton)
- Jordann Reese (Drake)
- Chevelle Saunsoci (Creighton)

Legend

- (C) Team captain
- (S) Suspended
- (I) Ineligible
- (W) Walk-on
- Injured
- Current redshirt

Roster

== Schedule and results ==
Date time, TV	Rank^{#}	Opponent^{#}	Result	Record	High points	High rebounds	High assists	Site (attendance) city, state
Exhibition
October 30, 2023*; 6:00 p.m.	No. 22	Nebraska–Kearney	W 93–42		–	–	–	D. J. Sokol Arena; Omaha, NE
Regular season
November 6, 2023*; 6:00 p.m.	No. 22	vs. North Dakota State	W 75–52	1–0	23 – Jensen	5 – Tied	4 – Tied	Sanford Pentagon (1,405); Sioux Falls, SD
November 10, 2023*; 11:30 a.m., YurView	No. 22	South Dakota	W 81–55	2–0	30 – Maly	10 – Maly	6 – Jensen	D. J. Sokol Arena (1,539); Omaha, NE
November 16, 2023*; 6:00 p.m., YurView	No. 22	Green Bay	L 53–65	2–1	21 – Jensen	6 – Tied	6 – Mogensen	D. J. Sokol Arena (1,027); Omaha, NE
November 19, 2023*; 1:00 p.m., BTN	No. 22	at Nebraska	W 79–74	3–1	23 – Maly	10 – Brake	3 – Tied	Pinnacle Bank Arena (6,604); Lincoln, NE
November 23, 2023*; 3:00 p.m., FloHoops		vs. Georgia Tech; Cancún Challenge Riviera Division	W 57–46	4–1	16 – Jensen	10 – Brake	5 – Maly	Moon Palace Golf & Spa Resort (137); Cancún, Mexico
November 24, 2023*; 3:00 p.m., FloHoops		vs. Michigan State; Cancún Challenge Riviera Division	W 83–69	5–1	32 – Jensen	14 – Ronsiek	3 – Jensen	Moon Palace Golf & Spa Resort (250); Cancún, Mexico
December 3, 2023*; 1:00 p.m., YurView		Northern Iowa	W 115–62	6–1	25 – Ronsiek	10 – Maly	7 – Mogensen	D. J. Sokol Arena (1,598); Omaha, NE
December 10, 2023*; 2:00 p.m., MW Network	No. 22	at Wyoming	W 73–61	7–1	22 – Ronsiek	7 – Mogensen	5 – Jensen	Arena-Auditorium (2,204); Laramie, WY
December 13, 2023; 7:00 p.m., FloHoops	No. 20	at No. 19 Marquette	L 70–76	7–2 (0–1)	29 – Ronsiek	7 – Maly	3 – Jensen	Al McGuire Center (1,503); Milwaukee, WI
December 17, 2023*; 2:00 p.m., ESPN+	No. 20	at Drake	W 89–78	8–2	31 – Ronsiek	7 – Maly	6 – Mogensen	Knapp Center (3,108); Des Moines, IA
December 21, 2023*; 6:00 p.m., KYNE-TV	No. 21т	South Dakota State	W 58–46	9–2	19 – Ronsiek	8 – Mogensen	5 – Jensen	D. J. Sokol Arena (2,056); Omaha, NE
December 30, 2023; 4:00 p.m., YurView	No. 21	St. John's	W 67–56	10–2 (1–1)	20 – Jensen	6 – Townsend	6 – Jensen	D. J. Sokol Arena (1,839); Omaha, NE
January 3, 2024; 6:00 p.m., SNY	No. 21	No. 12 UConn	L 50–94	10–3 (1–2)	13 – Ronsiek	6 – Mogensen	4 – Mogensen	D. J. Sokol Arena (2,374); Omaha, NE
January 6, 2024; 3:00 p.m., FS1	No. 21	at DePaul	W 75–68	11–3 (2–2)	17 – Jensen	9 – Tied	5 – Jensen	Wintrust Arena (1,404); Chicago, IL
January 10, 2024; 6:00 p.m., FloHoops	No. 22	Butler	W 89–53	12–3 (3–2)	25 – Ronsiek	6 – Tied	8 – Mogensen	D. J. Sokol Arena (1,131); Omaha, NE
January 14, 2024; 1:00 p.m., KYNE-TV	No. 22	Providence	W 81–70	13–3 (4–2)	22 – Tied	8 – Maly	5 – Mogensen	D. J. Sokol Arena (1,620); Omaha, NE
January 21, 2024; 11:00 a.m., CBSSN	No. 21	at Villanova	W 63–49	14–3 (5–2)	24 – Maly	13 – Maly	5 – Ronsiek	Finneran Pavilion (2,651); Villanova, PA
January 24, 2024; 6:00 p.m., FloHoops	No. 21	at Georgetown	W 77–72	15–3 (6–2)	21 – Jensen	6 – Townsend	5 – Mogensen	McDonough Gymnasium (522); Washington, D.C.
January 28, 2024; 1:00 p.m., CBSSN	No. 21	Seton Hall	W 57–49	16–3 (7–2)	18 – Ronsiek	9 – Tied	5 – Mogensen	D. J. Sokol Arena (1,773); Omaha, NE
January 31, 2024; 6:00 p.m., YurView	No. 22	Marquette	W 76–71	17–3 (8–2)	21 – Maly	7 – Ronsiek	6 – Mogensen	D. J. Sokol Arena (1,321); Omaha, NE
February 4, 2024; 1:00 p.m., FloHoops	No. 22	at Butler	W 75–65	18–3 (9–2)	26 – Ronsiek	12 – Brake	5 – Jensen	Hinkle Fieldhouse (1,041); Indianapolis, IN
February 6, 2024; 6:00 p.m., FloHoops	No. 21	at Xavier	W 77–46	19–3 (10–2)	17 – Tied	9 – Ronsiek	5 – Tied	Cintas Center (1,117); Cincinnati, OH
February 10, 2024; 3:00 p.m., YurView	No. 21	DePaul	W 88–59	20–3 (11–2)	29 – Ronsiek	8 – Jensen	6 – Ronsiek	D. J. Sokol Arena (2,102); Omaha, NE
February 16, 2024; 6:00 p.m., FloHoops	No. 20	at St. John's	W 71–51	21–3 (12–2)	20 – Tied	7 – Maly	8 – Mogensen	Carnesecca Arena (476); Queens, NY
February 19, 2024; 11:00 a.m., FOX	No. 21	at No. 15 UConn	L 53–73	21–4 (12–3)	18 – Jensen	9 – Mogensen	3 – Jensen	XL Center (15,684); Hartford, CT
February 24, 2024; 11:00 a.m., FOX	No. 21	Villanova	W 79–69	22–4 (13–3)	20 – Jensen	8 – Maly	6 – Mogensen	D. J. Sokol Arena (2,188); Omaha, NE
February 27, 2024; 6:00 p.m., YurView	No. 23	Xavier	W 99–57	23–4 (14–3)	25 – Ronsiek	8 – Maly	7 – Ronsiek	D. J. Sokol Arena (1,411); Omaha, NE
March 3, 2024; 2:00 p.m., FS1	No. 23	at Seton Hall	W 72–65	24–4 (15–3)	16 – Jensen	12 – Maly	4 – Jensen	Walsh Gymnasium (1,040); South Orange, NJ
Big East Women's Tournament
March 9, 2024; 6:00 p.m., FS2	(2) No. 21	vs. (7) Seton Hall; Quarterfinals	W 72–65	25–4	23 – Maly	9 – Tied	3 – Tied	Mohegan Sun Arena; Uncasville, CT
March 10, 2024; 4:00 p.m., FS1	(2) No. 21	vs. (6) Georgetown; Semifinals	L 46–55	25–5	14 – Maly	6 – Maly	2 – Tied	Mohegan Sun Arena; Uncasville, CT
NCAA Women's Tournament
March 23, 2024*; 6:00 p.m., ESPNews	(7 A2) No. 24	vs. (10 A2) No. 20 UNLV; First Round	W 87–73	26–5	25 – Jensen	8 – Maly	9 – Mogensen	Pauley Pavilion (8,841); Los Angeles, CA
March 25, 2024*; 7:30 p.m., ESPN2	(7 A2) No. 24	at (2 A2) No. 6 UCLA; Second Round	L 63–67	26–6	20 – Jensen	8 – Mogensen	5 – Mogensen	Pauley Pavilion (7,839); Los Angeles, CA
*Non-conference game. ^{#}Rankings from AP Poll. (#) Tournament seedings in parentheses. A2=Albany 2. All times are in Central.

== Rankings ==
Ranking movements Legend: ██ Increase in ranking ██ Decrease in ranking RV = Received votes т = Tied with team above or below
	Week																				
Poll	Pre	1	2	3	4	5	6	7	8	9	10	11	12	13	14	15	16	17	18	19	Final
AP	22	22	RV	RV	22	20	21т	21	21	22	21	21	22	21	20	21	23	21	23	24	23
Coaches	23т	24	RV	25	21	20	21	21	21	21	21	20	21	20	19	21	20	18	21	20	19

== See also ==
- 2023–24 Creighton Bluejays men's basketball team
