= Caroline Ducharme =

American basketball player (born 2002)

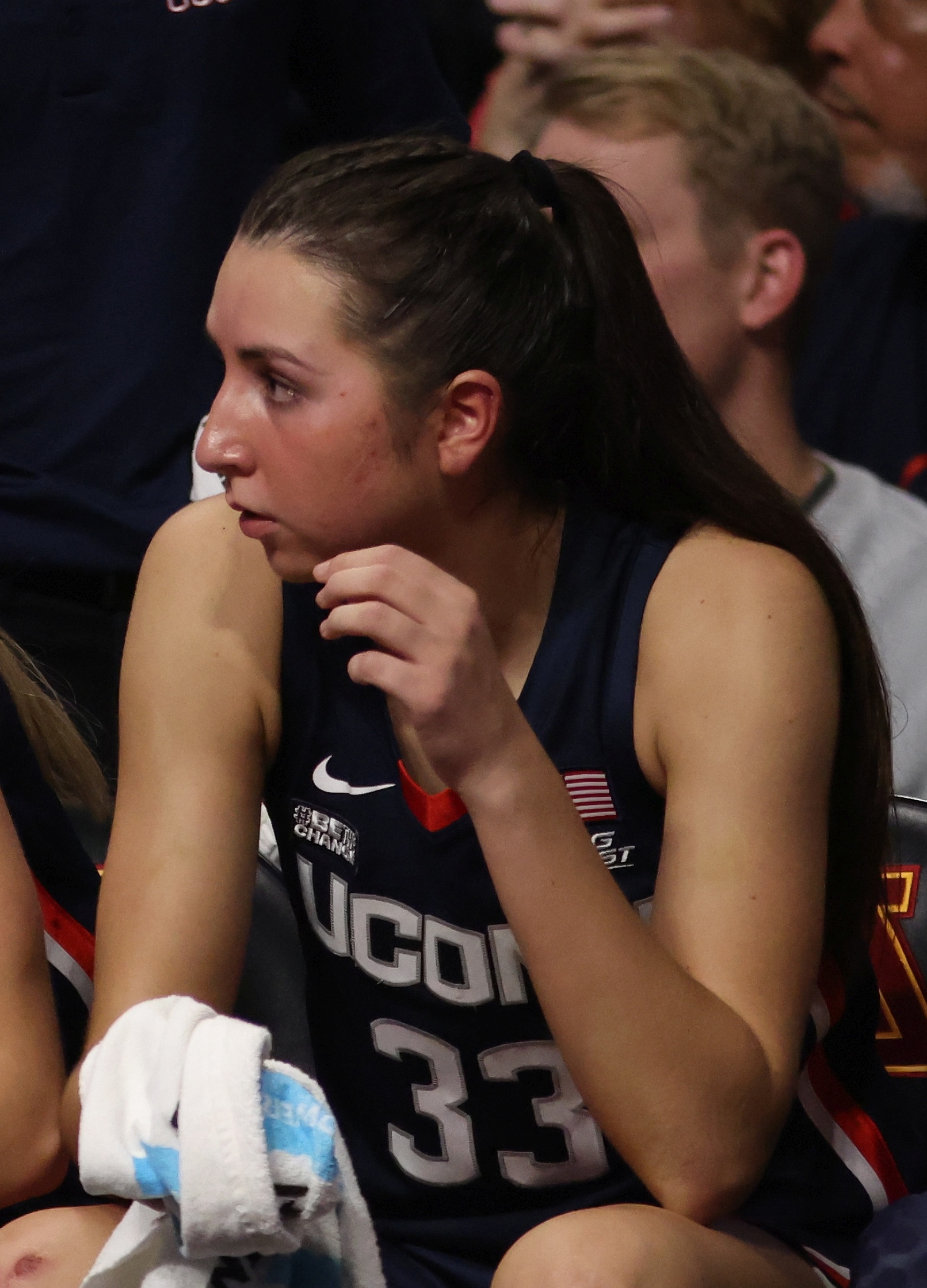
- Ducharme in 2023

No. 33 – Explosivas de Moca
- Position: Shooting guard
- League: Baloncesto Superior Nacional Femenino

Personal information
- Born: November 9, 2002 (age 23) Milton, Massachusetts, U.S.
- Listed height: 6 ft 2 in (1.88 m)

Career information
- High school: Noble and Greenough School (Dedham, Massachusetts)
- College: UConn (2021–2026)

Career highlights
- NCAA champion (2025); Big East All-Freshman Team (2022); McDonald's All-American (2021)
- Stats at WNBA.com
- Stats at Basketball Reference

Caroline Ducharme (born November 9, 2002) is a former American college basketball player for the UConn Huskies of the Big East Conference. Now playing in Puerto Rico for the Explosivas de Moca in the Baloncesto Superior Nacional Femenino. She was selected as an All Star in her rookie season in 2026.

Ducharme attended the Noble and Greenough School in Dedham, Massachusetts, and was ranked as the number 11 recruit in her class by ESPN. As a high school senior, she garnered numerous honors, including being named a McDonald's High School All-American.

== College career ==
=== Freshman year ===
At the start of the 2021–22 season, Ducharme was relegated to a bench role. However, when starting guard Paige Bueckers injured her left knee on December 5, Ducharme got more playing time as a result. In that game, she scored 14 points in the fourth quarter to help the Huskies beat their rival Notre Dame. Bueckers' and Azzi Fudd's injuries led to Ducharme assuming a scoring role, averaging 15.8 points over the next 15 games. The return of the two players led to a decrease in Ducharme's role, as she had limited playing time during UConn's tournament run. Despite the reduced playing time, Ducharme was named to the Big East All-Freshman team and All-Big East Second Team.

=== Sophomore year ===
Ducharme's role was set to increase in the 2022–23 season with the departure of guard Christyn Williams, but injuries hindered her season. She missed UConn's home opener against Northeastern, and missed 13 games due to a concussion sustained in January. When she wasn't out, she had an increased playing role due to Paige Bueckers being out for the season with a torn ACL, and Azzi Fudd being out for the majority of the season with a right knee injury.

In the 2023 Big East tournament, Ducharme was removed from the Huskies' game against Georgetown with a head injury after colliding into her teammate, Aaliyah Edwards.

In the 2023 March Madness tournament, Ducharme played a depth role behind Fudd and Lou Lopez Sénéchal.

=== Junior year ===
In the 2023-24 season, Ducharme started the first four games, averaging just 4 points per game before taking a medical redshirt. She noted that her concussions were having a larger impact on her life than originally anticipated, including issues completing schoolwork, dealing with loud noises and being in brightly-lit environments. Her issues were exacerbated by turbulence on a team flight to play in the Cayman Islands Classic, which brought on neck spasms for the junior.

Ducharme spent three months of the summer between her junior and redshirt junior seasons at Aviv Clinics, a medical facility in central Florida, in a multidisciplinary concussion treatment program that featured hyperbaric oxygen therapy.

=== Redshirt junior year ===
Although Ducharme participated in the 3-point contest during the team's ceremonial "First Night" celebration in October 2024, she sat out the first 27 games of the 2024-25 season. Her first game appearance occurred in the final 2:21 of the Huskies' regular season matchup against the Butler Bulldogs, where the redshirt junior tallied one rebound in her return to the court. She made brief appearances against Creighton and Marquette to close out the regular season.

In the 2025 Big East Tournament, Ducharme played a combined total of nine minutes, notching two points and an assist against St. John's in the quarterfinals and three points and a rebound against Villanova in the Big East semifinals.

Ducharme played sparingly in the 2025 March Madness Tournament, but had a season-high 11 minutes, six points and four rebounds in UConn's first round opener against Arkansas State. She appeared in the final two minutes of the Huskies' National Championship win against South Carolina.

In April 2025, Ducharme announced that she plans to return to Storrs for her redshirt senior season.

=== WNBA ===
On April 15, 2026 Ducharme agreed to a training camp contract with the Golden State Valkyries, putting her in a position to earn a roster spot on the squad.

== Career statistics ==
Legend
GP	Games played	GS	Games started	MPG	Minutes per game	RPG	Rebounds per game
APG	Assists per game	SPG	Steals per game	BPG	Blocks per game	PPG	Points per game
TO	Turnovers per game	FG%	Field-goal percentage	3P%	3-point field-goal percentage	FT%	Free-throw percentage
**Bold**	Career best	°	League leader

*	Denotes seasons in which Ducharme won an NCAA Championship

=== College ===
Year	Team	GP	GS	MPG	FG%	3P%	FT%	RPG	APG	SPG	BPG	TO	PPG
2021–22	UConn	**31**	**11**	21.1	**45.5**	28.8	**75.0**	3.2	**1.3**	**0.9**	**0.5**	1.6	**9.8**
2022–23	UConn	23	5	**22.3**	40.3	**33.8**	65.4	**4.1**	1.2	0.4	0.3	2.0	7.4
2023–24	UConn	4	4	14.8	31.3	25.0	66.7	2.0	0.5	0.8	0.3	**1.0**	4.0
2024–25*	UConn	9	0	3.7	29.4	14.3	0.0	0.7	0.2	0.1	0.0	0.4	1.2
**Career**		66	20	19.0	42.8	30.1	70.6	3.1	1.1	0.6	0.3	1.6	7.6
Statistics retrieved from Sports-Reference.

== Personal life ==
Ducharme's quiet disposition has earned her the nicknames "Mute" and "Silent Assassin."

Ducharme's father, Todd, played football and competed in track and field at Williams College. Her mother, Chrissy, played basketball at Williams College. Her brother, Reid, appeared in five basketball games at Xavier as a freshman before transferring to play at Siena. Her sister, Ashley, played basketball at Brown University.
