= 2022–23 Princeton Tigers women's basketball team =

Intercollegiate basketball season

2022–23 Princeton Tigers women's basketball

Ivy League regular-season co-champions Ivy League tournament champions

NCAA tournament, second round
- Conference: Ivy League
- Record: 24–6 (12–2 Ivy)
- Head coach: Carla Berube (4th season)
- Assistant coaches: Lauren Battista (4th season); Lauren Dillon (4th season); Tiana-Jo Carter (1st season)
- Home arena: Jadwin Gymnasium

2022–23 Ivy League women's basketball standings
	Conf.				Overall
Team	W		L	PCT	W		L	PCT
Columbia	12	–	2	.857	26	–	5	.839
Princeton†	12	–	2	.857	24	–	6	.800
Harvard	9	–	5	.643	20	–	11	.645
Penn	9	–	5	.643	17	–	12	.586
Yale	7	–	7	.500	13	–	14	.481
Brown	4	–	10	.286	11	–	15	.423
Cornell	3	–	11	.214	10	–	17	.370
Dartmouth	0	–	14	.000	2	–	26	.071
† 2023 Ivy League tournament winner As of March 24, 2023

The 2022–23 Princeton Tigers women's basketball team represented Princeton University during the 2022–23 NCAA Division I women's basketball season. The Tigers, led by fourth-year head coach Carla Berube, played their home games at Jadwin Gymnasium in Princeton, New Jersey as members of the Ivy League. They finished the Ivy League season 12–2, winning a share of the championship alongside Columbia. The Tigers won the 2023 Ivy League women's basketball tournament, their fourth championship title, and earned an automatic bid to the 2023 NCAA Division I women's basketball tournament, the team's tenth appearance. They lost to Utah in the second round.

== Previous season ==
The Tigers finished the 2021–22 season with a 25–5 overall record, 14–0 in Ivy League play, to finish in first place and win the conference's regular-season championship. As the top seed in the Ivy League tournament, they defeated Harvard and Columbia to win the championship. They received an automatic bid to the NCAA tournament, where they were the eleventh seed in the Bridgeport Region. They defeated Kentucky in the first round before losing to Indiana to end their season.

== Roster ==
2022–23 Princeton Tigers women's basketball team
Players
Coaches

Pos.	#	Name	Height	Year	Previous school	Hometown
F	0	Ellie Mitchell	6 ft 1 in (1.85 m)	Jr	Georgetown Visitation Prep	Chevy Chase, MD
G	1	Adaora Nwokeji	5 ft 8 in (1.73 m)	So	Summer Creek	Houston, TX
F	3	Tabitha Amanze	6 ft 4 in (1.93 m)	Fr	Blair Academy (N.J.)	Ogun, Nigeria
F	5	Paige Morton	6 ft 3 in (1.91 m)	So	Oak Knoll	Summit, NJ
G	10	Grace Stone	5 ft 11 in (1.8 m)	Sr	Long Island Lutheran	Glen Cove, NY
F	11	Taylor Charles	6 ft 2 in (1.88 m)	Fr	Burlington Central	Elgin, IL
G	12	Maggie Connolly	5 ft 8 in (1.73 m)	Sr	Ursuline Academy	Wilmington, DE
G	20	Kaitlyn Chen	5 ft 9 in (1.75 m)	Jr	Flintridge Prep	San Marino, CA
F	21	Kira Emsbo	6 ft 5 in (1.96 m)	Sr	Lakewood	Lakewood, CO
F	22	Parker Hill	6 ft 4 in (1.93 m)	So	Winston Churchill	Bethesda, MD
G	23	Madison St. Rose	5 ft 10 in (1.78 m)	Fr	St. John Vianney	Old Bridge, NJ
G	24	Julia Cunningham (C)	5 ft 11 in (1.8 m)	Sr	Watchung Hills	Watchung, NJ
G	25	Chet Nweke	6 ft 0 in (1.83 m)	Jr	Stone Ridge	Woodbine, MD
G	32	Amelia Osgood	5 ft 9 in (1.75 m)	So	Brentwood	Brentwood, TN
G/F	33	Lexi Weger	6 ft 3 in (1.91 m)	Sr	Episcopal (V.A.)	South Hadley, MA
F	44	Katie Thiers	6 ft 2 in (1.88 m)	So	Roosevelt	Seattle, WA

Head coach

- Carla Berube (Connecticut)

Assistant coach(es)

- Lauren Battista (Bentley)
- Lauren Dillon (Tufts)
- Tiana-Jo Carter (Bentley)

Legend

- (C) Team captain
- (S) Suspended
- (I) Ineligible
- (W) Walk-on
- Injured
- Current redshirt

Roster
Last update: March 11, 2023

2022–23 Ivy awards and recognition
- Kaitlyn Chen – Player of the Year; First Team All-Ivy
- Madison St. Rose – Rookie of the Year
- Ellie Mitchell – Co-Defensive Player of the Year
- Julia Cunningham – Second Team All-Ivy
- Grace Stone – Second Team All-Ivy; Academic All-Ivy

== Schedule ==
Date time, TV	Rank^{#}	Opponent^{#}	Result	Record	Site (attendance) city, state
Non-conference regular season
November 7, 2022*; 5:00 p.m.	No. 24	Temple	W 67–49	1–0	Jadwin Gymnasium (454); Princeton, NJ
November 11, 2022*; 7:00 p.m.	No. 24	Villanova	L 59–69	1–1	Jadwin Gymnasium (1,061); Princeton, NJ
November 14, 2022*; 7:00 p.m.		at Seton Hall	W 62–58	2–1	Walsh Gymnasium (680); South Orange, NJ
November 16, 2022*; 7:00 p.m.		Fordham	W 70–67	3–1	Jadwin Gymnasium (572); Princeton, NJ
November 19, 2022*; 12:00 p.m.		at Buffalo	Canceled		Alumni Arena; Buffalo, NY
November 27, 2022*; 2:00 p.m.		at Texas	L 50–74	3–2	Moody Center (5,137); Austin, TX
December 2, 2022*; 7:00 p.m.		at Maine	W 65–51	4–2	Cross Insurance Center (965); Bangor, ME
December 5, 2022*; 7:00 p.m.		at Towson	W 71–54	5–2	SECU Arena (424); Towson, MD
December 8, 2022*; 7:00 p.m., SNY		at No. 6 Connecticut	L 64–69	5–3	Harry A. Gampel Pavilion (8,731); Storrs, CT
December 11, 2022*; 6:00 p.m.		Delaware	W 62–47	6–3	Jadwin Gymnasium (713); Princeton, NJ
December 15, 2022*; 7:00 p.m.		at Rutgers; Rivalry	W 77–56	7–3	Jersey Mike's Arena (1,161); Piscataway, NJ
December 28, 2022*; 2:00 p.m.		Rhode Island	W 56–54	8–3	Jadwin Gymnasium (841); Princeton, NJ
December 31, 2022; 12:00 p.m., ESPNews		at Harvard	L 59–67	8–4 (0–1)	Lavietes Pavilion (1,278); Cambridge, MA
January 6, 2023; 7:00 p.m., ESPNU		Columbia	L 55–58 ^{OT}	8–5 (0–2)	Jadwin Gymnasium (1,113); Princeton, NJ
January 7, 2023; 5:00 p.m.		Cornell	W 70–48	9–5 (1–2)	Jadwin Gymnasium (1,017); Princeton, NJ
January 12, 2023*; 6:00 p.m.		Hartford	W 84–37	10–5	Jadwin Gymnasium (385); Princeton, NJ
January 14, 2023; 2:00 p.m., SNY/NBCSPHI		Brown	W 67–54	11–5 (2–2)	Jadwin Gymnasium (1,322); Princeton, NJ
January 16, 2023; 2:00 p.m., SNY/NBCSPHI		Penn	W 55–40	12–5 (3–2)	Jadwin Gymnasium (1,018); Princeton, NJ
January 21, 2023; 2:00 p.m.		at Dartmouth	W 79–59	13–5 (4–2)	Leede Arena (468); Hanover, NH
January 28, 2023; 2:00 p.m.		Yale	W 79–30	14–5 (5–2)	Jadwin Gymnasium (1,223); Princeton, NJ
February 3, 2023; 6:00 p.m.		at Cornell	W 63–52	15–5 (6–2)	Newman Arena (756); Ithaca, NY
February 4, 2023; 4:00 p.m., SNY		at Columbia	W 74–56	16–5 (7–2)	Levien Gymnasium (2,653); New York, NY
February 11, 2023; 1:00 p.m.		Dartmouth	W 64–47	17–5 (8–2)	Jadwin Gymnasium (1,305); Princeton, NJ
February 17, 2023; 7:00 p.m.		at Brown	W 80–37	18–5 (9–2)	Pizzitola Sports Center (326); Providence, RI
February 18, 2023; 5:00 p.m.		at Yale	W 68–42	19–5 (10–2)	John J. Lee Amphitheater (567); New Haven, CT
February 24, 2023; 6:00 p.m.		Harvard	W 51–47	20–5 (11–2)	Jadwin Gymnasium (1,744); Princeton, NJ
March 3, 2023; 7:00 p.m., NBCSPHI		at Penn	W 71–52	21–5 (12–2)	Palestra (2,671); Philadelphia, PA
Ivy League tournament
March 10, 2023; 4:30 p.m., ESPN+	(1)	vs. (4) Penn; Semifinals	W 60–47	22–5	Jadwin Gymnasium (2,238); Princeton, NJ
March 11, 2023; 5:00 p.m., ESPNews	(1)	vs. (3) Harvard; Championship game	W 54–48	23–5	Jadwin Gymnasium (1,922); Princeton, NJ
NCAA tournament
March 17, 2023*; 10:00 p.m., ESPN2	(10 G2)	vs. (7 G2) NC State; First round	W 64–63	24–5	Jon M. Huntsman Center (7,130); Salt Lake City, UT
March 19, 2023*; 7:00 p.m., ESPN2	(10 G2)	at (2 G2) No. 8 Utah; Second round	L 56–63	24–6	Jon M. Huntsman Center (8,663); Salt Lake City, UT
*Non-conference game. ^{#}Rankings from AP poll. (#) Tournament seedings in parentheses. G=Greenville 2. All times are in Eastern.

== Rankings ==
Ranking movements Legend: ██ Increase in ranking ██ Decrease in ranking — = Not ranked RV = Received votes
	Week																		
Poll	Pre	1	2	3	4	5	6	7	8	9	10	11	12	13	14	15	16	17	Final
AP	24	24	RV	RV	—	—	—	—	—	—	—	—	—	—	—	—	—	—	—
Coaches	25		RV	RV	—	—	—	—	—	—	—	—	—	—	—	—	—	—	—

Legend
	Increase in ranking
	Decrease in ranking
	Not ranked previous week
(RV)	Received votes
(NR)	Not ranked and did not receive votes

The Coaches Poll did not release a poll for the week of November 7.
