= 2022–23 Columbia Lions women's basketball team =

American college basketball season

2022–23 Columbia Lions women's basketball

Ivy League regular-season co-champions

WNIT championship vs. Kansas, L 59–66
- Conference: Ivy League
- Record: 28–6 (12–2 Ivy)
- Head coach: Megan Griffith (7th season)
- Assistant coaches: Tyler Cordell; Allie Bassetti; Cy Lippold
- Home arena: Levien Gymnasium

2022–23 Ivy League women's basketball standings
	Conf.				Overall
Team	W		L	PCT	W		L	PCT
Columbia	12	–	2	.857	26	–	5	.839
Princeton†	12	–	2	.857	24	–	6	.800
Harvard	9	–	5	.643	20	–	11	.645
Penn	9	–	5	.643	17	–	12	.586
Yale	7	–	7	.500	13	–	14	.481
Brown	4	–	10	.286	11	–	15	.423
Cornell	3	–	11	.214	10	–	17	.370
Dartmouth	0	–	14	.000	2	–	26	.071
† 2023 Ivy League tournament winner As of March 24, 2023

The 2022–23 Columbia Lions women's basketball team represented Columbia University during the 2022–23 NCAA Division I women's basketball season. The Lions, led by seventh-year head coach Megan Griffith, played their home games at Levien Gymnasium in Manhattan, New York as members of the Ivy League.

They finished the Ivy League season 12–2, winning a share of the title for the first time in program history. Columbia was the No. 2 seed at the 2023 Ivy League women's basketball tournament, but they fell to Harvard in the semifinals. After being the first team left out of the NCAA tournament field, the Lions accepted an auto-bid to the 2023 WNIT. They were the first Ivy League team to reach the semifinals or finals of the WNIT. Columbia lost to Kansas in the WNIT championship game.

== Previous season ==
They finished the previous season 25–7, 12–2 in Ivy League play. They lost to Princeton in the 2022 Ivy League women's basketball tournament finals.

== Roster ==
2022–23 Columbia Lions women's basketball team
Players
Coaches

Pos.	#	Name	Height	Year	Previous school	Hometown
F	0	Susie Rafiu	6 ft 1 in (1.85 m)	Fr	Copleston	Ipswich, England
G/F	1	Perri Page	5 ft 11 in (1.8 m)	Fr	Chartiers Valley	Pittsburgh, PA
G	2	Madison Hardy	5 ft 9 in (1.75 m)	Sr	Our Lady of Good Counsel	Gaithersburg, MD
G/F	4	Kaitlyn Davis	6 ft 0 in (1.83 m)	Sr	Greenwich Academy	Norwalk, CT
G	5	Jaida Patrick	5 ft 10 in (1.78 m)	Sr	Saddle River Day School; Duke	West Haverstraw, NY
G	10	Kitty Henderson	5 ft 10 in (1.78 m)	So	St Luke's Grammar School	North Curl Curl, Australia
F	11	Mary Lobon	6 ft 1 in (1.85 m)	Jr	Caxton College	Valencia, Spain
F	12	Hannah Pratt	6 ft 1 in (1.85 m)	Sr	Boca Raton	Boca Raton, FL
G	15	Carly Rivera	5 ft 4 in (1.63 m)	Sr	St. John's College High School	Arlington, VA
G/F	20	Sienna Durr	6 ft 0 in (1.83 m)	Sr	Grinnell	Grinnell, IA
G	21	Nicole Stephens (injured)	5 ft 7 in (1.7 m)	Jr	Pickerington Central	Pickerington, OH
G/F	23	Lilian Kennedy (C)	5 ft 11 in (1.8 m)	Sr	Mountain View	Buford, GA
F/C	33	Noa Comesaña (injured)	6 ft 1 in (1.85 m)	So	IES de Beade	Vigo, Spain
G/F	34	Paige Lauder	6 ft 1 in (1.85 m)	Jr	Villa Maria Academy	Malvern, PA
G	35	Abbey Hsu (C)	5 ft 11 in (1.8 m)	Jr	Marjory Stoneman Douglas High School; St. Thomas Aquinas High School	Parkland, FL

Head coach

- Megan Griffith (Columbia)

Assistant coach(es)

- Tyler Cordell (Ohio Wesleyan)
- Allie Bassetti (Rowan)
- Cy Lippold (Dartmouth)

Legend

- (C) Team captain
- (S) Suspended
- (I) Ineligible
- (W) Walk-on
- Injured
- Current redshirt

Roster
Last update: March 9, 2023

2022–23 Ivy awards and recognition
- Megan Griffith – Coach of the Year
- Kaitlyn Davis – First Team All-Ivy
- Abbey Hsu – First Team All-Ivy
- Jaida Patrick – Second Team All-Ivy
- Carly Rivera – Academic All-Ivy
- Kitty Henderson – Honorable Mention

== Schedule ==
Date time, TV	Rank^{#}	Opponent^{#}	Result	Record	Site (attendance) city, state
Non-conference regular season
November 7, 2022*; 8:00 p.m., ESPN+		at Memphis	W 77–69	1–0	Elma Roane Fieldhouse (611); Memphis, TN
November 10, 2022*; 7:00 p.m., FloHoops		at Delaware	W 64–56	2–0	Bob Carpenter Center (956); Newark, DE
November 13, 2022*; 2:00 p.m., ESPN+		Vanderbilt	L 63–74	2–1	Levien Gymnasium (913); Manhattan, NY
November 17, 2022*; 7:00 p.m., Big East Digital Network		at Seton Hall	W 83–76	3–1	Walsh Gymnasium (675); South Orange, NJ
November 20, 2022*; 12:00 p.m., Big 12 Now/ESPN+		at No. 7/8 Iowa State	L 76–99	3–2	Hilton Coliseum (9,451); Ames, IA
November 25, 2022*; 1:00 p.m.		vs. Arkansas–Pine Bluff; Miami Thanksgiving Tournament	W 95–57	4–2	Watsco Center (124); Coral Gables, FL
November 27, 2022*; 2:00 p.m., ACCN		at Miami (FL); Miami Thanksgiving Tournament	W 78–71	5–2	Watsco Center (1,658); Coral Gables, FL
December 1, 2022*; 7:00 p.m., ESPN+		Marist	W 103–54	6–2	Levien Gymnasium (393); Manhattan, NY
December 3, 2022*; 1:00 p.m., ESPN+		Lafayette	W 91–43	7–2	Levien Gymnasium (464); Manhattan, NY
December 7, 2022*; 7:00 p.m., SNY		at Stony Brook	W 84–68	8–2	Island Federal Credit Union Arena (777); Stony Brook, NY
December 10, 2022*; 12:00 p.m., NESN		at Massachusetts	W 83–74	9–2	Mullins Center (984); Amherst, MA
December 13, 2022*; 7:00 p.m., NEC Front Row		at LIU	W 90–47	10–2	Steinberg Wellness Center (120); Brooklyn, NY
December 28, 2022*; 1:00 p.m., ESPN+		Ohio	W 81–59	11–2	Levien Gymnasium (572); Manhattan, NY
Ivy League regular season
December 31, 2022; 1:00 p.m., ESPN+		at Yale	W 97–53	12–2 (1–0)	John J. Lee Amphitheater (335); New Haven, CT
January 6, 2023; 7:00 p.m., ESPNU		at Princeton	W 58–55 ^{OT}	13–2 (2–0)	Jadwin Gymnasium (1,113); Princeton, NJ
January 7, 2023; 5:00 p.m., ESPN+		at Penn	L 67–71	13–3 (2–1)	The Palestra (678); Philadelphia, PA
January 14, 2023; 12:00 p.m., SNY/ESPN+		Harvard	W 82–56	14–3 (3–1)	Levien Gymnasium (1,127); Manhattan, NY
January 16, 2023; 2:00 p.m., ESPN+		at Cornell	W 91–64	15–3 (4–1)	Newman Arena (579); Ithaca, NY
January 21, 2023; 2:00 p.m., ESPN+		Brown	W 94–74	16–3 (5–1)	Levien Gymnasium (1,167); Manhattan, NY
January 28, 2023; 2:00 p.m., ESPN+		Dartmouth; Pride Game	W 79–50	17–3 (6–1)	Levien Gymnasium (1,335); Manhattan, NY
February 3, 2023; 6:00 p.m., ESPN+		Penn; Alumnae Weekend	W 72–50	18–3 (7–1)	Levien Gymnasium (2,111); Manhattan, NY
February 4, 2023; 4:00 p.m., SNY/ESPN+		Princeton; Alumnae Weekend	L 56–74	18–4 (7–2)	Levien Gymnasium (2,653); Manhattan, NY
February 11, 2023; 12:00 p.m., SNY/ESPN+		Yale; Play4Kay Game	W 74–46	19–4 (8–2)	Levien Gymnasium (1,485); Manhattan, NY
February 17, 2023; 7:00 p.m., ESPN+		at Harvard	W 75–70	20–4 (9–2)	Lavietes Pavilion (1,056); Cambridge, MA
February 18, 2023; 4:00 p.m., ESPN3		at Dartmouth	W 80–37	21–4 (10–2)	Leede Arena (806); Hanover, NH
February 25, 2023; 4:00 p.m., ESPN3		at Brown	W 83–55	22–4 (11–2)	Pizzitola Sports Center (427); Providence, RI
March 4, 2023; 2:00 p.m., ESPN+		Cornell; Senior Day	W 69–64 ^{OT}	23–4 (12–2)	Levien Gymnasium (2,602); Manhattan, NY
Ivy League tournament
March 10, 2023; 7:00 p.m., ESPN+	(2)	vs. (3) Harvard; Semifinals	L 65–72 ^{OT}	23–5	Jadwin Gymnasium (2,238); Princeton, NJ
WNIT
March 17, 2023*; 7:00 p.m., ESPN3		FDU; First round	W 69–53	24–5	Levien Gymnasium (593); Manhattan, NY
March 20, 2023*; 7:00 p.m., SNY/ESPN3		Fordham; Second round	W 78–73	25–5	Levien Gymnasium (975); Manhattan, NY
March 24, 2023*; 7:00 p.m., SNY/ESPN3		Syracuse; Super 16	W 88–82	26–5	Levien Gymnasium (1,537); Manhattan, NY
March 26, 2023*; 4:00 p.m., ESPN3		Harvard; Great 8	W 77–71	27–5	Levien Gymnasium (1,689); Manhattan, NY
March 29, 2023*; 6:00 p.m., ESPN3		at Bowling Green; Fab 4	W 77–70	28–5	Stroh Center (4,155); Bowling Green, OH
April 1, 2023*; 5:30 p.m., CBSSN		at Kansas; Championship	L 59–66	28–6	Allen Fieldhouse (11,701); Lawrence, KS
*Non-conference game. ^{#}Rankings from AP poll. (#) Tournament seedings in parentheses. All times are in Eastern.

== Rankings ==
Ranking movements Legend: ██ Increase in ranking ██ Decrease in ranking — = Not ranked RV = Received votes
	Week																		
Poll	Pre	1	2	3	4	5	6	7	8	9	10	11	12	13	14	15	16	17	Final
AP	—	—	—	—	—	—	RV	RV	RV	RV	—	—	—	RV	—	—	RV	—	—
Coaches	—	—	—	—	—	—	—	—	—	RV	RV	RV	RV	RV	—	—	—	—	—

Legend
	Increase in ranking
	Decrease in ranking
	Not ranked previous week
(RV)	Received votes
(NR)	Not ranked and did not receive votes

The Coaches Poll did not release a poll for the week of November 7.

== See also ==
- 2022–23 Columbia Lions men's basketball team
