= 2022–23 Yale Bulldogs women's basketball team =

Intercollegiate basketball season

2022–23 Yale Bulldogs women's basketball
- Conference: Ivy League
- Record: 13–14 (7–7 Ivy)
- Head coach: Dalila Eshe (1st season)
- Assistant coaches: Sam Guastella; Sara Mitchell; Amber Raisner
- Home arena: John J. Lee Amphitheater

2022–23 Ivy League women's basketball standings
	Conf.				Overall
Team	W		L	PCT	W		L	PCT
Columbia	12	–	2	.857	26	–	5	.839
Princeton†	12	–	2	.857	24	–	6	.800
Harvard	9	–	5	.643	20	–	11	.645
Penn	9	–	5	.643	17	–	12	.586
Yale	7	–	7	.500	13	–	14	.481
Brown	4	–	10	.286	11	–	15	.423
Cornell	3	–	11	.214	10	–	17	.370
Dartmouth	0	–	14	.000	2	–	26	.071
† 2023 Ivy League tournament winner As of March 24, 2023

The 2022–23 Yale Bulldogs women's basketball team represented Yale University during the 2022–23 NCAA Division I women's basketball season. The Bulldogs, led by first-year head coach Dalila Eshe, played their home games at John J. Lee Amphitheater of the Payne Whitney Gymnasium in New Haven, Connecticut as members of the Ivy League. They finished the season at 13–14, 7–7 in Ivy League play, to finish in fifth place. The Bulldogs failed to qualify for the Ivy League women's tournament.

== Previous season ==
The Bulldogs finished the 2021–22 season 16–11, 9–5 in Ivy League play, to finish in third place. They qualified for the Ivy League women's basketball tournament but lost to Columbia in the semifinals.

== Roster ==
2022–23 Yale Bulldogs women's basketball team
Players
Coaches

Pos.	#	Name	Height	Year	Previous school	Hometown
G	0	Lilah Grubman	5 ft 10 in (1.78 m)	Fr	Syosset	Syosset, NY
G	1	Jenna Clark	5 ft 7 in (1.7 m)	Jr	Thomas Jefferson	Pittsburgh, PA
F	2	Camilla Emsbo (C)	6 ft 5 in (1.96 m)	Sr	Lakewood	Lakewood, CO
G	3	Christen McCann	5 ft 9 in (1.75 m)	So	Lincoln Park Academy	Port St. Lucie, FL
G	10	Avery Lee	5 ft 8 in (1.73 m)	So	Menlo	Los Altos Hills, CA
G	11	Klara Astrom	5 ft 9 in (1.75 m)	Jr	Pinewood School	Menlo Park, CA
F	13	Haley Sabol	6 ft 2 in (1.88 m)	Jr	Episcopal	Pittsburgh, PA
F	20	Grace Thybulle	6 ft 3 in (1.91 m)	So	Irvington	Irvington, NY
G	21	Kiley Capstraw	5 ft 10 in (1.78 m)	Fr	West Orange	West Orange, NJ
F	22	Brenna McDonald	6 ft 2 in (1.88 m)	Jr	Natick	Natick, MA
G	23	Lola Lesmond	6 ft 0 in (1.83 m)	Fr	Worcester Academy	Sanary, France
G/F	24	Mackenzie Egger	5 ft 11 in (1.8 m)	So	Mount Pleasant	Mount Pleasant, MI
G	30	Nyla McGill	5 ft 8 in (1.73 m)	So	Providence	Charlotte, NC

Head coach

- Dalila Eshe (Florida)

Assistant coach(es)

- Sam Guastella (Quinnipiac)
- Sara Mitchell (NJIT)
- Amber Raisner (Union (NY))

Legend

- (C) Team captain
- (S) Suspended
- (I) Ineligible
- (W) Walk-on
- Injured
- Current redshirt

Roster
Last update: March 11, 2023

2022–23 Ivy Awards and recognition
- Nyla McGill – Co-Defensive Player of the Year
- Jenna Clark – Second Team All-Ivy
- Klara Astrom – Academic All-Ivy

== Schedule ==
Date time, TV	Rank^{#}	Opponent^{#}	Result	Record	Site (attendance) city, state
Non-conference regular season
November 7, 2022*; 5:30 p.m.		at Fordham	L 67–80	0–1	Rose Hill Gymnasium (425); The Bronx, NY
November 11, 2022*; 7:00 p.m.		at Saint Joseph's	L 54–59	0–2	Hagan Arena (614); Philadelphia, PA
November 14, 2022*; 7:00 p.m.		Fairfield	W 68–61	1–2	John J. Lee Amphitheater; New Haven, CT
November 16, 2022*; 6:00 p.m.		at Army	W 71–66	2–2	Christl Arena (630); West Point, NY
November 19, 2022*; 6:00 p.m.		at Maine	W 55–46	3–2	Cross Insurance Center (1,198); Bangor, ME
November 25, 2022*; 4:30 p.m.		vs. New Mexico State; University of Denver Classic	W 73–65	4–2	Hamilton Gymnasium (333); Denver, CO
November 26, 2022*; 4:30 p.m.		vs. Houston Christian; University of Denver Classic	L 61–68	4–3	Hamilton Gymnasium (355); Denver, CO
November 30, 2022*; 7:00 p.m.		at No. RV UMass	L 57–72	4–4	Mullins Center (758); Amherst, MA
December 4, 2022*; 12:00 p.m., NESN		Syracuse; Yale Police Department Community Day/Toys for Tots Teddy Toss	L 58–60	4–5	John J. Lee Amphitheater; New Haven, CT
December 7, 2022*; 6:00 p.m.		at Quinnipiac	L 59–75	4–6	M&T Bank Arena (439); Hamden, CT
December 11, 2022*; 12:00 p.m.		Drexel	W 60–58 ^{OT}	5–6	John J. Lee Amphitheater (274); New Haven, CT
December 13, 2022*; 4:00 p.m.		Boston University	W 58–46	6–6	John J. Lee Amphitheater; New Haven, CT
December 21, 2022*; 6:00 p.m.		Lehigh	L 63–70	6–7	John J. Lee Amphitheater (215); New Haven, CT
Ivy League regular season
December 31, 2022; 1:00 p.m.		No. RV Columbia	L 53–97	6–8 (0–1)	John J. Lee Amphitheater (335); New Haven, CT
January 6, 2023; 6:00 p.m.		at Dartmouth	W 57–7	7–8 (1–1)	Leede Arena (475); Hanover, NH
January 7, 2023; 7:00 p.m.		at Harvard	W 71–70 ^{OT}	8–8 (2–1)	Lavietes Pavilion (867); Cambridge, MA
January 14, 2023; 3:00 p.m., NESN		Cornell; MLK Weekend Celebration/Rally Towel Giveaway	W 68–56	9–8 (3–1)	John J. Lee Amphitheater (302); New Haven, CT
January 16, 2023; 3:00 p.m.		at Brown	W 72–59	10–8 (4–1)	Pizzitola Sports Center (349); Providence, RI
January 21, 2023; 2:00 p.m.		at Penn	L 57–79	10–9 (4–2)	Palestra (597); Philadelphia, PA
January 28, 2023; 2:00 p.m.		at Princeton	L 30–79	10–10 (4–3)	Jadwin Gymnasium (1,223); Princeton, NJ
February 3, 2023; 6:00 p.m.		Harvard; Alum Weekend/Lunar New Year Celebration	L 54–67	10–11 (4–4)	John J. Lee Amphitheater (600); New Haven, CT
February 4, 2023; 4:00 p.m., NESN		Dartmouth; Alum Weekend/Breast Cancer Awareness Game	W 69–56	11–11 (5–4)	John J. Lee Amphitheater (612); New Haven, CT
February 11, 2023; 12:00 p.m., SNY		at Columbia	L 46–74	11–12 (5–5)	Levien Gymnasium (1,485); New York, NY
February 17, 2023; 6:00 p.m.		Penn; Equity and Inclusion Game	L 58–72	11–13 (5–6)	John J. Lee Amphitheater (403); New Haven, CT
February 18, 2023; 5:00 p.m.		Princeton; National Girls and Women in Sports Day Celebration	L 42–68	11–14 (5–7)	John J. Lee Amphitheater (567); New Haven, CT
February 25, 2023; 2:00 p.m.		at Cornell	W 63–42	12–14 (6–7)	Newman Arena (846); Ithaca, NY
March 4, 2023; 2:00 p.m.		Brown; Senior Day/Pride Day/Alum Day	W 63–53	13–14 (7–7)	John J. Lee Amphitheater (479); New Haven, CT
*Non-conference game. ^{#}Rankings from AP poll. (#) Tournament seedings in parentheses. All times are in Eastern.

== See also ==
- 2022–23 Yale Bulldogs men's basketball team
