= Kaitlyn Chen =

American basketball player (born 2002)

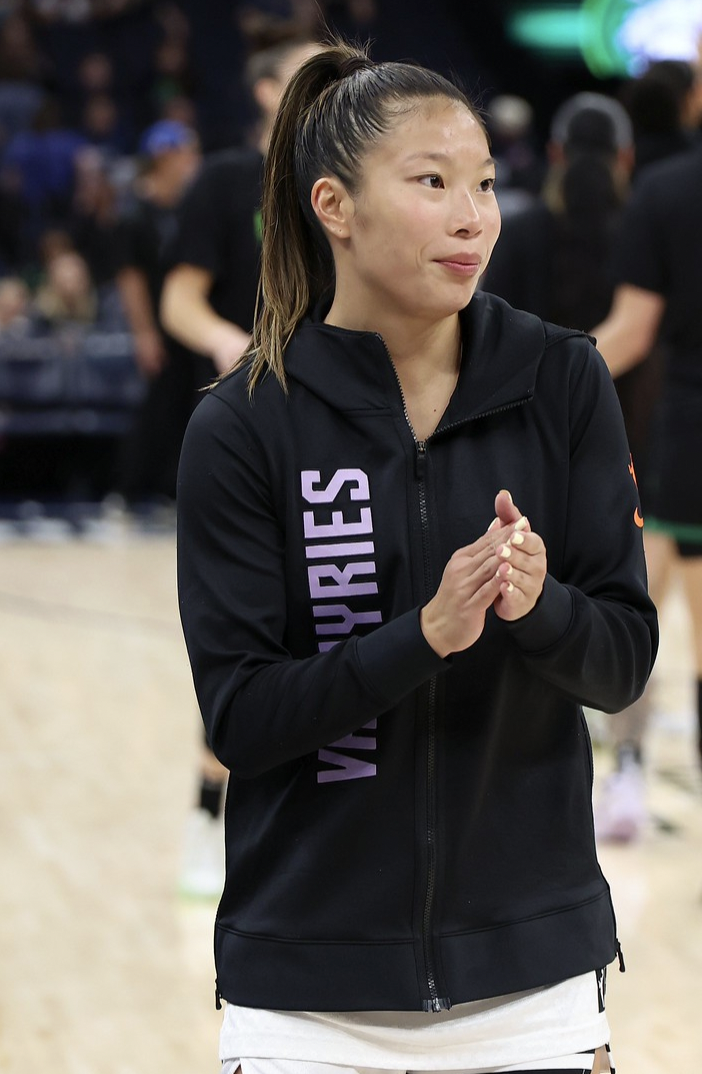
- Chen with Golden State Valkyries in 2025

No. 2 – Golden State Valkyries
- Position: Point guard / shooting guard
- League: WNBA

Personal information
- Born: February 22, 2002 (age 24) San Marino, California, U.S.
- Listed height: 5 ft 9 in (1.75 m)

Career information
- High school: Flintridge Prep (La Cañada Flintridge, California)
- College: Princeton (2021–2024); UConn (2024–2025)
- WNBA draft: 2025: 3rd round, 30th overall pick
- Drafted by: Golden State Valkyries
- Playing career: 2025–present

Career history
- 2025–present: Golden State Valkyries
- 2025: USK Praha
- 2027–present: Breeze

Career highlights
- WNBA champion (2026); NCAA champion (2025); Ivy League Player of the Year (2023); 2× First-team All-Ivy League (2023, 2024); 3× Ivy League tournament MOP (2022–2024)
- Stats at Basketball Reference

Kaitlyn Chen
- Traditional Chinese: 陳紫柔
- Simplified Chinese: 陈紫柔
Transcriptions
Standard Mandarin
- Hanyu Pinyin: Chén Zǐróu
- Bopomofo: ㄔㄣˊ ㄗˇ ㄖㄡˊ
- Wade–Giles: Chʻên^{2} Tzŭ^{3}-jou^{2}
Yue: Cantonese
- Jyutping: Can4 Zi2 Jau4
Southern Min
- Hokkien POJ: Tân Chí-liû

Kaitlyn Sarah Chen (Chinese: 陳紫柔; born February 22, 2002) is an American professional basketball player for the Golden State Valkyries of the Women's National Basketball Association (WNBA) and for the Breeze of Unrivaled. She played college basketball at UConn and Princeton. She was the first person of Taiwanese descent to be drafted by a WNBA team and to play in a WNBA game. During her rookie season, the Valkyries became the first WNBA expansion franchise to reach the playoffs in its inaugural season, and in her second year with the team in 2026, the Valkyries won the WNBA championship.

== Early life and high school career ==
Chen was born and raised in San Marino, California to Taiwanese American immigrants. She attended K.L. Carver Elementary School and Huntington Middle School. She played four sports as a child.

Chen played basketball for Flintridge Preparatory School in La Cañada Flintridge, California, where she holds the school records in points, rebounds and assists. She also played with Cal Storm Team Taurasi, an Amateur Athletic Union (AAU) program competing in the Nike Elite Youth Basketball League. Chen was named All-Area Player of the Year as a sophomore, and earned Pasadena Star-News All-Area Player of the Year honors in her final two seasons. Rated a four-star recruit and number 66 in her class by ESPN, she committed to play college basketball for Princeton over offers from California and North Carolina.

== College career ==
=== Princeton ===
Chen did not play in her freshman season at Princeton, which was canceled due to the COVID-19 pandemic.

In her sophomore season, Chen made her college debut coming off the bench to record nine points, four rebounds, three assists and two steals in a 59–42 win over Villanova. In the 2022 Ivy League tournament final, she scored a season-high 30 points in a 77–59 win over Columbia, and was named tournament most outstanding player (MOP). The title qualified the Princeton team for the 2022 NCAA tournament, where she recorded 17 points in a 69–62 win over sixth-seeded Kentucky in the first round. She later scored 10 points in a 55–56 loss against third-seeded Indiana in the second round. As a sophomore, Chen averaged 10.5 points, 2.9 rebounds and 3.2 assists per game, leading her team in assists.

In her junior season, Chen started in 29 out of 30 games played. She led Princeton to the 2023 Ivy League tournament title with 21 points and six rebounds in a 54–48 win against Harvard, repeating as MOP of the tournament. In the 2023 NCAA tournament, she posted 22 points, seven rebounds and four assists in a 64–63 victory against NC State in the first round. She then recorded 19 points and six rebounds in 56–63 loss against Utah in the second round. She averaged 16.2 points, 4.1 rebounds and 3.8 assists per game, leading her team in both points and assists. She earned Ivy League Player of the Year and first-team All-Ivy League honors.

As a senior, Chen served as the captain of the Princeton team. She posted 17 points and six assists in a 75–58 victory against Columbia during the 2024 Ivy League tournament, earning the team its third straight title. She received the MOP award a third time. In the 2024 NCAA tournament, she scored 17 points in a 53–63 loss against West Virginia. Chen was named first-team All-Ivy League and Women's Basketball Coaches Association (WBCA) All-America honorable mention. Over the season, she averaged 15.8 points, 3.5 rebounds and 4.9 assists, once again leading her team in points and assists. On December 11, 2023, she scored a career-high 31 points in a 61–58 win over Villanova.

While at Princeton, Chen accumulated 1,276 points, 313 rebounds and 359 assists over three seasons and 90 games, ranking third in career assists and 12th in career points in Princeton women's basketball history. She received the C. Otto von Kiebusch Sportswoman of the Year Award, an award given annually to a Princeton senior woman of "high scholastic rank who has demonstrated general proficiency in athletics and the qualities of a true sportswoman". Kaitlyn graduated from Princeton in 2024 with a degree in medical anthropology.

As the Ivy League does not allow for graduate participants in varsity sports, Chen entered the transfer portal during her senior year with one year of eligibility remaining. She was ranked 9th among transfers in the nation by ESPN.

=== UConn ===
UConn head coach Geno Auriemma first expressed interest in Chen during the 2022–23 season, when she posted 18 points and seven assists in a 64–69 loss against his team on December 8, 2022. He contacted Princeton head coach Carla Berube, who had formerly played at UConn and been coached by Auriemma, to discuss her. Chen later cited UConn and UCLA as the finalists for her graduate season.

For the 2024-2025 season, Chen ultimately elected to transfer to UConn, replacing the graduating Nika Mühl in the backcourt. She was named a Preseason All-Big East Team honorable mention.

Chen started at point guard for all 40 games UConn played that season, which ended with UConn winning the NCAA Championship on April 6, 2025. She posted 135 assists, third most on the team after 2025 Wade Trophy winner (and WNBA #1 draft pick) Paige Bueckers and 2025 College Freshman of the Year Sarah Strong. As she became more of a facilitator, she also became more efficient, improving her 2 point and 3 point shooting percentage, her free throw percentage and her assist to turnover ratio as UConn made its run to the championship. Her teammates also praised her as a leader and a mentor throughout the year. During the NCAA tournament, she had 24 assists against only 5 turnovers, and had 15 points on 6-9 shooting in the Elite Eight matchup against USC. UConn coach Geno Auriemma called Chen "the perfect addition for what this team needed at the position that we needed it." She holds the distinction of being the first person of Taiwanese descent to win a women's college basketball championship.

== Professional career ==
=== WNBA ===
==== Golden State Valkyries (2025–present) ====
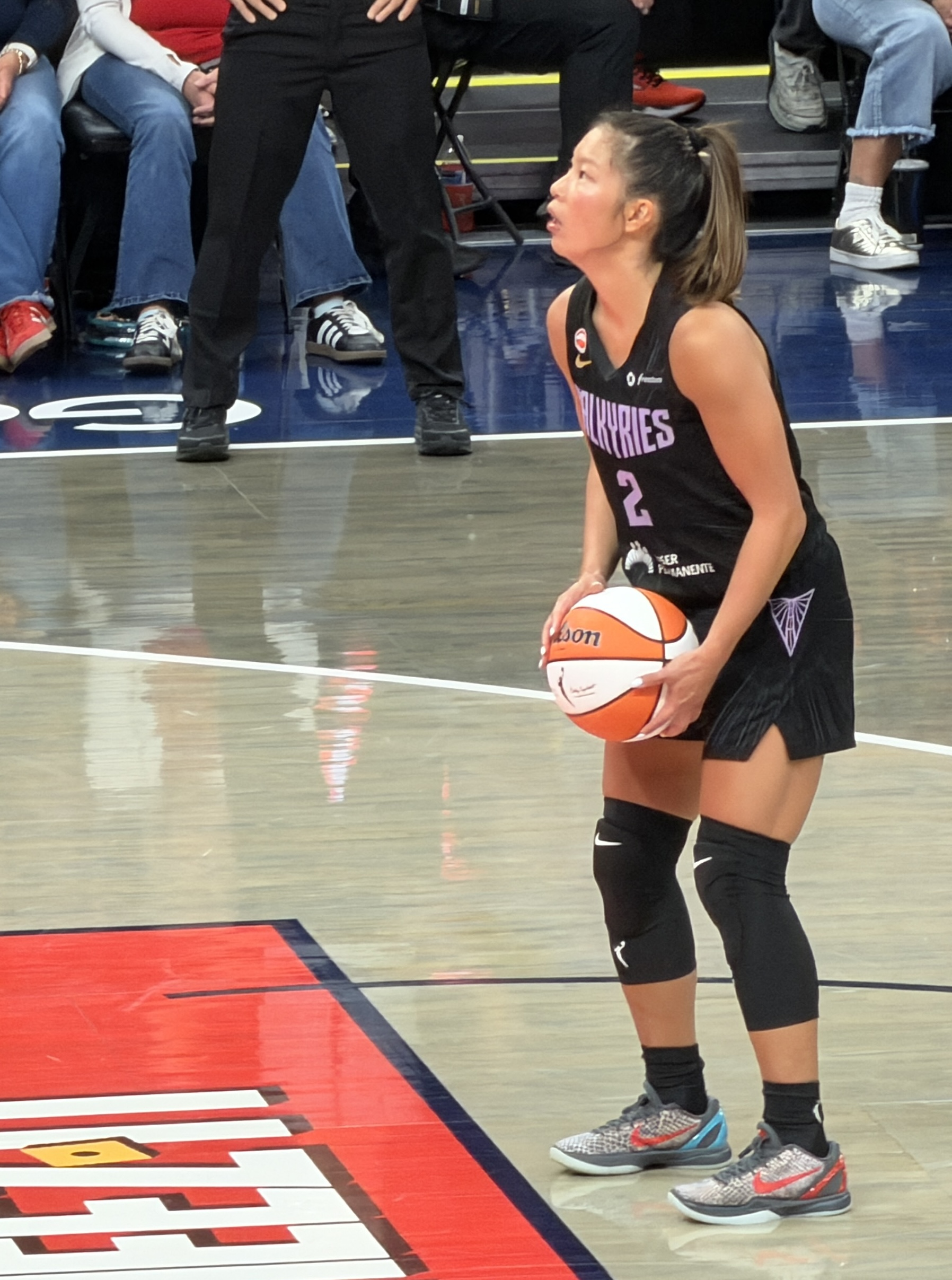
Chen preparing to shoot a free throw during a game against the Indiana Fever at Gainbridge Fieldhouse in Indianapolis, Indiana in 2026.

On April 15, 2025, the Golden State Valkyries selected Chen during the third round of the WNBA draft. She became the first person of Taiwanese descent to be drafted by a WNBA team. On May 6, she became the first person of Taiwanese descent to play in a preseason WNBA game. Chen was waived by the Valkyries on May 14.

On June 15, after she signed a professional contract with the 3x3 Basketball Association (3XBA) but before she began play, Chen re-signed with the Valkyries. Chen made her WNBA regular season debut on June 22, 2025, in an 87–63 win against the Connecticut Sun where she recorded five points in 21 minutes. She averaged 10 minutes and 2 points per game over 24 games in her inaugural season.

As a second year professional, Chen signed a training camp contract with the Golden State Valkyries on April 12, 2026. In the team's only preseason game on April 25, a 78–76 victory over the Seattle Storm, she recorded 11 points, three assists, and two rebounds. Chen's 29 minutes played were a game-high for both teams. On May 7, the Valkyries officially announced that Chen had earned a spot on its roster to begin the regular season. She made her second-year season debut the next day, in a 90-81 win against the Storm, where she scored 14 points off the bench in 16 minutes, while adding two assists and a rebound. On June 17, she helped spark a 91-80 win over the Dallas Wings against her former UConn teammates Paige Bueckers and Azzi Fudd, scoring 15 points on 7 of 10 shooting, two assists, and two rebounds in a regular season career high 25 minutes. Paige Bueckers commented after the game that Chen "has one of the best lay-up packages I have ever seen." On July 20, in a 90-82 loss to the Washington Mystics at the Chase Center, Chen scored a WNBA career-high 20 points and six assists off the bench. Chen finished the regular season having played in all 44 games, averaging 15.3 minutes, 7.2 points, 1.9 assists and 1.1 rebounds per game. She scored in double figures in 15 games, including scoring a team high 18 points, all in the second half, in a 76-75 win against the Los Angeles Sparks in the final game of the regular season, which helped secure the number two seed in the playoffs for the Valkyries. Although Chen's average minutes per game decreased during the 2026 playoffs, she scored 11 points in a Valkyries victory in the first game of the semi-final matchup against the reigning champion Las Vegas Aces, averaging 8 points per game in the Valkyries three game sweep of that series. After overcoming both the Dallas Wings and the Aces, Chen and the Valkyries reached the WNBA Finals, with the Valkyries defeating the Atlanta Dream in seven games to win their first championship in only their second year of existence.

Unrivaled

On October 28, 2026, the 3-on-3 Unrivaled Basketball League announced that Kaitlyn Chen had signed a one year contract for the 2027 season. She is being reunited with former UConn teammate Paige Bueckers on Breeze BC, which will also include former Valkyries teammate Monique Billings. After a short rest following the 2026 WNBA finals, she returned to training prior to joining Breeze BC, working with San Francisco based player development coach Kevin Hatch, alongside former colleague Kate Martin who was heading to Australia for the WNBA offseason. Hatch praised Chen for "how fully she engages with every rep. She listens, makes adjustments, and brings intensity while staying composed.”

=== Euroleague ===
On October 4, 2025, Chen joined USK Praha of the Czech Women's Basketball League, which also plays in Euroleague Women. During her two-and-a-half month contract in Europe, she had some success. On October 23, she had 10 points, nine assists and seven rebounds against Arka Gdynia during Euroleague Women competition. She made her first professional start on November 2, against Basket Ostrava, and she scored a then professional career-high 18 points against BK Brno on November 30. She played her last game with USK Praha on December 17.

=== Athletes Unlimited ===
In September 2025, Chen joined Athletes Unlimited Pro Basketball for its fifth season, expanding her professional experience following her rookie year in the WNBA. She had a successful first season, ending the first week at the head of the AU leader board, scoring a then league high 32 points in a key match up in week 3, and being named Newcomer of the Year for her contributions during AU's fifth season. Overall, she averaged 14.8 point, 4.9 assists, and 3.6 rebounds per game while ranking second in assists per game and third in three-point percentage.

Participation in Basketball Clinics

Chen has also participated in training of young basketball players. In March 2026, Chen travelled to Taiwan to carry out her first ever basketball clinic in Taipei to over 20 young Taiwanese players. On November 18-21, 2026, Chen participated in the inaugural WNBA/FIBA Women's Basketball Without Borders Next Up camp in Singapore, with her team reaching the finals in the end of camp single elimination tournament. This camp included over 80 high school age prospects from all over the world, and other professional players and coaches conducting the camp included Chelsea Gray, Bridget Carleton, and Jordin Canada, Jose Fenandez (head coach of the Dallas Wings), Sugar Rodgers (assistant coach of the Golden State Valkyries), and Kristi Toliver (assistant coach of the Phoenix Mercury).

== Career statistics ==
Legend
GP	Games played	GS	Games started	MPG	Minutes per game	RPG	Rebounds per game
APG	Assists per game	SPG	Steals per game	BPG	Blocks per game	PPG	Points per game
TO	Turnovers per game	FG%	Field-goal percentage	3P%	3-point field-goal percentage	FT%	Free-throw percentage
**Bold**	Career best	°	League leader

†	Denotes season(s) in which Chen won a WNBA championship
*	Denotes seasons in which Chen won an NCAA Championship

=== WNBA ===
==== Regular season ====
WNBA regular season statistics
Year	Team	GP	GS	MPG	FG%	3P%	FT%	RPG	APG	SPG	BPG	TO	PPG
2025	Golden State	24	0	10.3	.380	.333	.714	.9	1.0	.2	.0	**.8**	2.0
2026^{†}	Golden State	**44**	0	**15.3**	**.527**	**.417**	**.721**	**1.1**	**1.9**	**.3**	.0	1.2	**7.2**
**Career**	2 years, 1 team	68	0	13.5	.502	.402	.720	1.1	1.6	.3	.0	1.0	5.3

==== Playoffs ====
Year	Team	GP	GS	MPG	FG%	3P%	FT%	RPG	APG	SPG	BPG	TO	PPG
2025	Golden State	1	0	4.0	**1.000**	—	—	**1.0**	1.0	.0	.0	**.0**	2.0
2026^{†}	Golden State	**13**	0	**9.5**	.385	**.500**	**1.000**	.8	**1.1**	.0	**.1**	.7	**3.9**
**Career**	2 years, 1 team	14	0	9.1	.396	.500	1.000	.9	1.1	.0	.1	.6	3.8

=== Athletes Unlimited ===
Year	Team	GP	GS	MPG	FG%	3P%	FT%	RPG	APG	SPG	BPG	TO	PPG
2026	Various	12	12	30.8	.527	.487	.903	3.6	4.9	1.16	.0	4.0	14.8

=== International ===
==== Euroleague Women ====
Rounds 1 and 2
Year	Team	GP	GS	MPG	FG%	3P%	FT%	RPG	APG	SPG	BPG	TO	PPG
2025–26	USK Praha	8	0	16.6	.472	.167	.600	2.3	2.4	.8	.0	1.1	4.8

==== Czech Women's Basketball League ====
Stats current through end of 2025

Regular Season
Year	Team	GP	GS	MPG	FG%	3P%	FT%	RPG	APG	SPG	BPG	TO	PPG
2025–26	USK Praha	9	1	19.2	.630	.270	.500	2.9	4.3	1.9	.0	1.9	7.6

=== College ===
Year	Team	GP	GS	MPG	FG%	3P%	FT%	RPG	APG	SPG	BPG	TO	PPG
2021–22	Princeton	30	21	29.5	.434	.282	.818	2.9	3.2	1.1	.1	2.5	10.5
2022–23	Princeton	30	29	33.9	.462	.265	.720	**4.1**	3.8	.9	.1	2.9	**16.2**
2023–24	Princeton	30	30	**34.9**	.488	.328	.766	3.5	**4.9**	**1.3**	**.3**	2.8	15.8
2024–25*	UConn	**40**	**40**	23.4	**.514**	**.354**	**.842**	1.8	3.4	1.2	.0	**1.6**	6.9
Career		130	120	29.9	.473	.313	.772	3.0	3.8	1.1	.1	2.4	11.9
