= 2022–23 Cornell Big Red women's basketball team =

Intercollegiate basketball season

2022–23 Cornell Big Red women's basketball
- Conference: Ivy League
- Record: 10–17 (3–11 Ivy)
- Head coach: Dayna Smith (21st season)
- Assistant coaches: Val Klopfer; Zack Stitt
- Home arena: Newman Arena

2022–23 Ivy League women's basketball standings
	Conf.				Overall
Team	W		L	PCT	W		L	PCT
Columbia	12	–	2	.857	26	–	5	.839
Princeton†	12	–	2	.857	24	–	6	.800
Harvard	9	–	5	.643	20	–	11	.645
Penn	9	–	5	.643	17	–	12	.586
Yale	7	–	7	.500	13	–	14	.481
Brown	4	–	10	.286	11	–	15	.423
Cornell	3	–	11	.214	10	–	17	.370
Dartmouth	0	–	14	.000	2	–	26	.071
† 2023 Ivy League tournament winner As of March 24, 2023

The 2022–23 Cornell Big Red women's basketball team represented Cornell University during the 2022–23 NCAA Division I women's basketball season. The Big Red, led by 21st-year head coach Dayna Smith, played their home games at Newman Arena in Ithaca, New York and were members of the Ivy League. They finished the season at 10–17, 3–11 in Ivy League play, to finish in seventh place. They failed to qualify for the Ivy League women's tournament.

== Previous season ==
The Big Red finished the 2021–22 season 9–16, 4–10 in Ivy League play, to finish in sixth place. They failed to qualify for the 2022 Ivy League women's basketball tournament.

== Roster ==
2022–23 Cornell Big Red women's basketball team
Players
Coaches

Pos.	#	Name	Height	Year	Previous school	Hometown
G	2	Val Garcia-Martinez	5 ft 8 in (1.73 m)	Jr	McAllen Memorial	McAllen, TX
G/F	3	Vivienne Knee	5 ft 9 in (1.75 m)	Fr	Lycée Français de New York	New York, NY
G	4	Sarah Hathorn	5 ft 4 in (1.63 m)	Fr	A&M Consolidated	College Station, TX
G	5	Ania McNicholas	5 ft 7 in (1.7 m)	Sr	Archbishop Mitty	San Jose, CA
F	11	Arianna Linoxilakis	6 ft 1 in (1.85 m)	So	Weston	Weston, MA
G	12	Mia Beam	5 ft 8 in (1.73 m)	Jr	Christian Academy	Louisville, KY
F	13	Jada Davis	6 ft 2 in (1.88 m)	So	The Bishop's School	San Diego, CA
G	20	Kaya Ingram	5 ft 8 in (1.73 m)	Jr	La Cueva	Albuquerque, NM
F	21	Anna Hovis	5 ft 11 in (1.8 m)	Sr	Bishop O'Connell	Falls Church, VA
G	22	Shannon Mulroy	5 ft 8 in (1.73 m)	Sr	Lenape	Mount Laurel, NJ
F	24	Summer Parker-Hall	5 ft 11 in (1.8 m)	So	Loyola Academy	Chicago, IL
G/F	25	Lexi Green	5 ft 9 in (1.75 m)	So	Pittsford Mendon	Pittsford, NY
F	31	Emily Pape	6 ft 1 in (1.85 m)	Fr	Maine South	Park Ridge, IL
G/F	33	Ruby Grace Williams	6 ft 0 in (1.83 m)	Fr	Cuthbertson	Waxhaw, NC

Head coach

- Dayna Smith (Rhode Island)

Assistant coach(es)

- Val Klopfer (Wake Forest)
- Zack Stitt (Geneva)

Legend

- (C) Team captain
- (S) Suspended
- (I) Ineligible
- (W) Walk-on
- Injured
- Current redshirt

Roster
Last update: November 12, 2024

== Schedule ==
Date time, TV	Rank^{#}	Opponent^{#}	Result	Record	Site (attendance) city, state
Non-conference regular season
November 9, 2022*; 7:00 p.m., ESPN+		at Colgate	L 48–62	0–1	Cotterell Court (483); Hamilton, NY
November 12, 2022*; 2:00 p.m., NEC Front Row		at FDU	L 51–62	0–2	Stratis Arena at the Rothman Center (204); Hackensack, NJ
November 16, 2022*; 7:00 p.m., ESPN+		Lafayette	W 62–60	1–2	Newman Arena; Ithaca, NY
November 19, 2022*; 1:00 p.m., ESPN+		Bucknell	L 58–65 ^{OT}	1–3	Newman Arena (109); Ithaca, NY
November 21, 2022*; 7:00 p.m., ESPN+		Mount St. Mary's	W 66–61	2–3	Newman Arena (98); Ithaca, NY
November 25, 2022*; 1:00 p.m., ESPN+		Western Kentucky	W 57–50	3–3	Newman Arena (226); Ithaca, NY
November 27, 2022*; 2:00 p.m., B1G+		at Rutgers	L 52–71	3–4	Jersey Mike's Arena (1,192); Piscataway, NJ
November 30, 2022*; 7:00 p.m., ESPN+		Binghamton	W 71–48	4–4	Newman Arena (187); Ithaca, NY
December 3, 2022*; 7:00 p.m., ESPN3		at UAlbany	W 53–45	5–4	SEFCU Arena (807); Troy, NY
December 5, 2022*; 7:00 p.m., Hartford Hawks All-Access		at Hartford	W 89–38	6–4	Chase Family Arena (228); West Hartford, CT
December 19, 2022*; 1:00 p.m., ESPN+		at Duquesne	L 60–87	6–5	UPMC Cooper Fieldhouse (501); Pittsburgh, PA
December 21, 2022*; 12:00 p.m., B1G+		at Penn State	L 48–79	6–6	Bryce Jordan Center (1,589); State College, PA
December 28, 2022*; 2:00 p.m., ESPN+		Clarion	W 93–49	7–6	Newman Arena; Ithaca, NY
Ivy League regular season
January 1, 2023; 2:00 p.m., ESPN+		Dartmouth	W 61–48	8–6 (1–0)	Newman Arena (113); Ithaca, NY
January 6, 2023; 6:00 p.m., ESPN+		at Penn	L 54–62	8–7 (1–1)	Palestra (547); Philadelphia, PA
January 7, 2023; 5:00 p.m., ESPN+		at Princeton	L 48–70	8–8 (1–2)	Jadwin Gymnasium (1,017); Princeton, NJ
January 14, 2023; 3:00 p.m., ESPN+		at Yale	L 56–68	8–9 (1–3)	John J. Lee Amphitheater (302); New Haven, CT
January 16, 2023; 2:00 p.m., ESPN+		No. RV Columbia; Martin Luther King, Jr. Day Celebration	L 64–91	8–10 (1–4)	Newman Arena (579); Ithaca, NY
January 21, 2023; 2:00 p.m., ESPN+		Harvard	L 53–66	8–11 (1–5)	Newman Arena (468); Ithaca, NY
January 28, 2023; 12:00 p.m., ESPN+		at Brown	W 66–61	9–11 (2–5)	Pizzitola Sports Center (435); Providence, RI
February 3, 2023; 6:00 p.m., ESPN+		Princeton	L 52–63	9–12 (2–6)	Newman Arena (756); Ithaca, NY
February 4, 2023; 4:00 p.m., ESPN+		Penn	L 54–67	9–13 (2–7)	Newman Arena; Ithaca, NY
February 11, 2023; 2:00 p.m., ESPN+		Brown	L 48–76	9–14 (2–8)	Newman Arena (291); Ithaca, NY
February 17, 2023; 6:00 p.m., ESPN+		at Dartmouth	W 53–40	10–14 (3–8)	Leede Arena (361); Hanover, NH
February 18, 2023; 5:00 p.m., ESPN3		at Harvard	L 59–86	10–15 (3–9)	Lavietes Pavilion (961); Cambridge, MA
February 25, 2023; 2:00 p.m., ESPN3		Yale	L 42–63	10–16 (3–10)	Newman Arena (846); Ithaca, NY
March 4, 2023; 2:00 p.m., ESPN+		at Columbia	L 64–69 ^{OT}	10–17 (3–11)	Levien Gymnasium (2,602); New York, NY
*Non-conference game. ^{#}Rankings from AP poll. (#) Tournament seedings in parentheses. All times are in Eastern.

== See also ==
- 2022–23 Cornell Big Red men's basketball team
