= 2022–23 Dartmouth Big Green women's basketball team =

Intercollegiate basketball season

2022–23 Dartmouth Big Green women's basketball
- Conference: Ivy League
- Record: 2–26 (0–14 Ivy)
- Head coach: Adrienne Shibles (2nd season)
- Assistant coaches: Jamie Insel; Sarah Assante; Victoria Lux
- Home arena: Leede Arena

2022–23 Ivy League women's basketball standings
	Conf.				Overall
Team	W		L	PCT	W		L	PCT
Columbia	12	–	2	.857	26	–	5	.839
Princeton†	12	–	2	.857	24	–	6	.800
Harvard	9	–	5	.643	20	–	11	.645
Penn	9	–	5	.643	17	–	12	.586
Yale	7	–	7	.500	13	–	14	.481
Brown	4	–	10	.286	11	–	15	.423
Cornell	3	–	11	.214	10	–	17	.370
Dartmouth	0	–	14	.000	2	–	26	.071
† 2023 Ivy League tournament winner As of March 24, 2023

The 2022–23 Dartmouth Big Green women's basketball team represented Dartmouth College during the 2022–23 NCAA Division I women's basketball season. The Big Green, led by second-year head coach Adrienne Shibles, played their home games at Leede Arena in Hanover, New Hampshire and were members of the Ivy League. They finished the season at 2–26, 0–14 to finish in last place. The Big Green failed to qualify for the Ivy League women's tournament.

== Previous season ==
Dartmouth finished the 2021–22 season 3–23, 2–12 in Ivy League play, to finish in seventh place. They failed to qualify for the 2022 Ivy League women's basketball tournament.

== Roster ==
2022–23 Dartmouth Big Green women's basketball team
Players
Coaches

Pos.	#	Name	Height	Year	Previous school	Hometown
G	1	Karina Mitchell	5 ft 8 in (1.73 m)	Sr	Mallard Creek	Charlotte, NC
F	2	Grace Niekelski	6 ft 0 in (1.83 m)	So	Mount Saint Joseph Academy	Blue Bell, PA
G	3	Mekkena Boyd	5 ft 8 in (1.73 m)	Jr	Champlain Valley Union	Williston, VT
G	4	Allie Harland	5 ft 10 in (1.78 m)	Sr	Yarra Valley Grammar	Melbourne, Australia
G	5	Mia Curtis	5 ft 9 in (1.75 m)	Jr	Minnehaha Academy	Minneapolis, MN
F	10	Olivia Lawlor	6 ft 1 in (1.85 m)	Fr	Summit	Summit, NJ
G	11	Camryn Foltz	5 ft 10 in (1.78 m)	Jr	Colts Neck	Sea Bright, NJ
G/F	12	Carrington Washington	6 ft 0 in (1.83 m)	Jr	Christ Presbyterian Academy	Brentwood, TN
F	13	Clare Meyer	6 ft 3 in (1.91 m)	Fr	Germantown Friends School	Philadelphia, PA
G	15	Victoria Page	5 ft 8 in (1.73 m)	So	Blackman	Murfreesboro, TN
G	20	Brooke Hollawell	5 ft 9 in (1.75 m)	Fr	Manasquan	Wall, NJ
G	22	Anna Nelson	5 ft 6 in (1.68 m)	Fr	Gorham	Gorham, ME
F	23	Kaiyah Corona	5 ft 11 in (1.8 m)	Sr	Windward	Los Angeles, CA
G	24	Leiya Stuart	5 ft 9 in (1.75 m)	So	St. George's	East Stroudsburg, PA
F	34	Emma Koch	6 ft 0 in (1.83 m)	Sr	Iowa City West	Iowa City, IA

Head coach

- Adrienne Shibles (Bates College)

Assistant coach(es)

- Jamie Insel (Assumption (MA))
- Sarah Assante (Saint Joseph's)
- Victoria Lux (Bentley)

Legend

- (C) Team captain
- (S) Suspended
- (I) Ineligible
- (W) Walk-on
- Injured
- Current redshirt

Roster
Last update: March 14, 2023

== Schedule ==
Date time, TV	Rank^{#}	Opponent^{#}	Result	Record	Site (attendance) city, state
Non-conference regular season
November 7, 2022*; 6:00 p.m., ESPN+		Bryant	L 63–70	0–1	Leede Arena (309); Hanover, NH
November 11, 2022*; 1:00 p.m., ESPN+		at Rhode Island	L 36–89	0–2	Ryan Center (1,044); South Kingstown, RI
November 13, 2022; 2:00 p.m., ESPN+		New Hampshire; Camp Reunion & Military Appreciation	L 56–59	0–3	Leede Arena (401); Hanover, NH
November 16, 2022*; 6:00 p.m., ESPN+		Merrimack	W 68–65	1–3	Leede Arena (307); Hanover, NH
November 27, 2022*; 2:00 p.m., ESPN+		Holy Cross	L 55–68	1–4	Leede Arena (351); Hanover, NH
December 1, 2022*; 7:00 p.m., NESN		Vermont	L 66–67	1–5	Leede Arena (358); Hanover, NH
December 3, 2022*; 2:00 p.m., ESPN+		at Siena	L 67–75	1–6	UHY Center (431); Loudonville, NY
December 6, 2022*; 2:00 p.m., ESPN+		Albany	L 45–73	1–7	Leede Arena (75); Hanover, NH
December 10, 2022*; 2:00 p.m., FloSports		at Monmouth	W 71–56	2–7	OceanFirst Bank Center (563); West Long Branch, NJ
December 13, 2022*; 12:00 p.m., ESPN+		Drexel; Education Day	L 49–64	2–8	Leede Arena (1,842); Hanover, NH
December 16, 2022*; 6:30 p.m., ESPN+		at Long Beach State; Beach Classic	L 55–69	2–9	Walter Pyramid (504); Long Beach, CA
December 17, 2022*; 4:00 p.m.		vs. UC Irvine; Beach Classic	L 57–72	2–10	Walter Pyramid; Long Beach, CA
December 21, 2022*; 1:00 p.m., B1G+		at No. 13 Iowa	L 54–92	2–11	Carver–Hawkeye Arena (8,100); Iowa City, IA
December 28, 2022*; 7:00 p.m., ESPN+		at UMass	L 58–77	2–12	Mullins Center (861); Amherst, MA
Ivy League regular season
January 1, 2023; 2:00 p.m., ESPN+		at Cornell	L 48–61	2–13 (0–1)	Newman Arena (113); Ithaca, NY
January 6, 2023; 6:00 p.m., ESPN+		Yale	L 47–57	2–14 (0–2)	Leede Arena (475); Hanover, NH
January 7, 2023; 5:00 p.m., ESPN+		Brown	L 58–66	2–15 (0–3)	Leede Arena (554); Hanover, NH
January 14, 2023; 2:00 p.m., ESPN+		at Penn	L 57–69	2–16 (0–4)	Palestra (709); Philadelphia, PA
January 16, 2023; 5:00 p.m., ESPN+		Harvard; Social Justice Day	L 52–68	2–17 (0–5)	Leede Arena (335); Hanover, NH
January 21, 2023; 2:00 p.m., ESPN+		Princeton; We Back Pat	L 59–79	2–18 (0–6)	Leede Arena (468); Hanover, NH
January 28, 2023; 2:00 p.m., ESPN+		at Columbia	L 50–79	2–19 (0–7)	Levien Gymnasium (1,335); New York, NY
February 3, 2023; 7:00 p.m., ESPN+		at Brown	L 76–82	2–20 (0–8)	Pizzitola Sports Center (412); Providence, RI
February 4, 2023; 4:00 p.m., NESN		at Yale	L 56–69	2–21 (0–9)	John J. Lee Amphitheater (612); New Haven, CT
February 11, 2023; 1:00 p.m., ESPN+		at Princeton	L 47–64	2–22 (0–10)	Jadwin Gymnasium (1,305); Princeton, NJ
February 17, 2023; 6:00 p.m., ESPN+		Cornell; Play4Kay	L 40–53	2–23 (0–11)	Leede Arena (361); Hanover, NH
February 18, 2023; 4:00 p.m., ESPN3		Columbia	L 37–80	2–24 (0–12)	Leede Arena (806); Hanover, NH
February 25, 2023; 2:00 p.m., ESPN3		Penn; Senior Day/Alumnae Day	L 37–54	2–25 (0–13)	Leede Arena (737); Hanover, NH
March 4, 2023; 4:00 p.m., ESPN+		at Harvard	L 40–64	2–26 (0–14)	Lavietes Pavilion (956); Cambridge, MA
*Non-conference game. ^{#}Rankings from AP poll. (#) Tournament seedings in parentheses. All times are in Eastern.

== See also ==
- 2022–23 Dartmouth Big Green men's basketball team
