= 2022–23 Brown Bears women's basketball team =

Intercollegiate basketball season

2022–23 Brown Bears women's basketball
- Conference: Ivy League
- Record: 11–15 (4–10 Ivy)
- Head coach: Monique LeBlanc (3rd season)
- Assistant coaches: Ugo Nwaigwe; Tyler Patch; Samantha Brenner
- Home arena: Pizzitola Sports Center

2022–23 Ivy League women's basketball standings
	Conf.				Overall
Team	W		L	PCT	W		L	PCT
Columbia	12	–	2	.857	26	–	5	.839
Princeton†	12	–	2	.857	24	–	6	.800
Harvard	9	–	5	.643	20	–	11	.645
Penn	9	–	5	.643	17	–	12	.586
Yale	7	–	7	.500	13	–	14	.481
Brown	4	–	10	.286	11	–	15	.423
Cornell	3	–	11	.214	10	–	17	.370
Dartmouth	0	–	14	.000	2	–	26	.071
† 2023 Ivy League tournament winner As of March 24, 2023

The 2022–23 Brown Bears women's basketball team represented Brown University during the 2022–23 NCAA Division I women's basketball season. The Bears, led by third-year head coach Monique LeBlanc, played their home games at the Pizzitola Sports Center in Providence, Rhode Island and were members of the Ivy League. They finished the season at 11–15, 4–10 in Ivy League play, to finish in sixth place. They failed to qualify for the Ivy League women's tournament.

== Previous season ==
The Bears finished the 2021–22 season 6–20, 1–13 in Ivy League play, to finish in last place. They failed to qualify for the Ivy League women's basketball tournament.

== Roster ==
2022–23 Brown Bears women's basketball team
Players
Coaches

Pos.	#	Name	Height	Year	Previous school	Hometown
F	0	Mya Murray	6 ft 2 in (1.88 m)	Jr	Uniontown Area Senior	Uniontown, PA
G	1	Lexi Love	5 ft 4 in (1.63 m)	Sr	Bishop O'Dowd	Oakland, CA
G	2	Kyla Jones	5 ft 9 in (1.75 m)	Jr	Whitney M. Young Magnet	Chicago, IL
G	3	Grace Kirk	5 ft 5 in (1.65 m)	Jr	Marshall School	Duluth, MN
G	4	Isabella Mauricio	5 ft 4 in (1.63 m)	So	Amador Valley	Pleasanton, CA
G	5	Myla Cox	6 ft 0 in (1.83 m)	Sr	Petal	Petal, MS
G	10	Lexy Calhoun	5 ft 8 in (1.73 m)	Fr	Harriton	Barrington, RI
G	11	Maddie Mullin	5 ft 9 in (1.75 m)	Sr	Beaver Country Day School	Wellesley, MA
F	12	Alyssa Moreland	5 ft 11 in (1.8 m)	Fr	Tilton	Beverly, MA
G	13	Charlotte Jewell	5 ft 7 in (1.7 m)	Jr	Thomas A. Edison	Alexandria, VA
G	14	Mady Calhoun	5 ft 10 in (1.78 m)	Fr	Barrington	Barrington, RI
F	15	Beth Nelson	6 ft 0 in (1.83 m)	Fr	Oakland	Murfreesboro, TN
G	21	Grace Arnolie	5 ft 8 in (1.73 m)	Fr	James Madison	Vienna, VA
G	22	Mackenzie Leahy	5 ft 8 in (1.73 m)	Fr	Jacobs	West Dundee, IL
F	23	Ada Anamekwe	6 ft 0 in (1.83 m)	Fr	Plano East	Parker, TX
C	25	Gianna Aiello	6 ft 4 in (1.93 m)	So	Matawan Regional	Matawan, NJ
G	33	Page Greenburg	5 ft 9 in (1.75 m)	Fr	Maret School	Washington, D.C.
F	44	Amanda Latkany	6 ft 1 in (1.85 m)	So	Rye	Rye, NY

Head coach

- Monique LeBlanc (Bucknell)

Assistant coach(es)

- Ugo Nwaigwe (Wagner)
- Tyler Patch (Rhode Island College)
- Samantha Brenner (Siena)

Legend

- (C) Team captain
- (S) Suspended
- (I) Ineligible
- (W) Walk-on
- Injured
- Current redshirt

Roster
Last update: March 12, 2023

== Awards and recognition ==
2022–23 Ivy awards and recognition
- Kyla Jones – Academic All-Ivy
- Grace Arnolie – Honorable Mention

== Schedule ==
Date time, TV	Rank^{#}	Opponent^{#}	Result	Record	Site (attendance) city, state
Non-conference regular season
November 7, 2022*; 7:00 p.m.		Fairfield; Brown Votes Game	L 52–62	0–1	Pizzitola Sports Center (638); Providence, RI
November 11, 2022*; 6:00 p.m.		at Duquesne	L 69–77	0–2	UPMC Cooper Fieldhouse (783); Pittsburgh, PA
November 13, 2022*; 5:30 p.m.		at Wagner	W 75–62	1–2	Spiro Sports Center; Staten Island, NY
November 16, 2022*; 7:00 p.m.		Sacred Heart; Pride Night	W 56–35	2–2	Pizzitola Sports Center (179); Providence, RI
November 19, 2022*; 2:00 p.m.		at UMass Lowell	W 67–56	3–2	Tsongas Center (252); Worcester, MA
November 25, 2022*; 2:00 p.m.		Monmouth	W 70–69	4–2	Pizzitola Sports Center (168); Providence, RI
November 28, 2022*; 7:00 p.m.		at Central Connecticut State	W 69–46	5–2	Detrick Gymnasium; New Britain, CT
November 30, 2022*; 7:00 p.m.		Holy Cross; Mental Health Awareness Game	L 45–60	5–3	Pizzitola Sports Center (138); Providence, RI
December 3, 2022*; 12:00 p.m.		Hartford	W 68–52	6–3	Pizzitola Sports Center (187); Providence, RI
December 7, 2022*; 7:00 p.m.		at Providence	L 44–62	6–4	Alumni Hall (174); Providence, RI
December 10, 2022*; 3:00 p.m.		Mitchell College; Cub Club Day	W 101–45	7–4	Pizzitola Sports Center (192); Providence, RI
December 28, 2022*; 5:00 p.m.		at Florida Gulf Coast	L 75–89	7–5	Alico Arena (1,404); Fort Myers, FL
Ivy League regular season
January 2, 2023; 2:00 p.m.		at Penn	L 53–74	7–6 (0–1)	The Palestra (533); Philadelphia, PA
January 6, 2023; 6:00 p.m.		at Harvard	L 59–89	7–7 (0–2)	Lavietes Pavilion (708); Cambridge, MA
January 7, 2023; 5:00 p.m.		at Dartmouth	W 66–58	8–7 (1–2)	Leede Arena (554); Hanover, NH
January 14, 2023; 2:00 p.m.		at Princeton	L 54–67	8–8 (1–3)	Jadwin Gymnasium (1,332); Princeton, NJ
January 16, 2023; 3:00 p.m.		Yale; Pregame Youth Clinic/Youth Day	L 59–72	8–9 (1–4)	Pizzitola Sports Center (349); Providence, RI
January 21, 2023; 2:00 p.m.		at Columbia	L 74–94	8–10 (1–5)	Levien Gymnasium (1,167); New York, NY
January 28, 2023; 12:00 p.m.		Cornell; Student Pizza Day	L 61–66	8–11 (1–6)	Pizzitola Sports Center (435); Providence, RI
February 3, 2023; 7:00 p.m.		Dartmouth; Faculty & Staff Appreciation Night	W 82–76	9–11 (2–6)	Pizzitola Sports Center (412); Providence, RI
February 4, 2023; 5:00 p.m.		Harvard; Pregame Youth Clinic/Youth Day, NGWSD, Play4Kay	L 61–74	9–12 (2–7)	Pizzitola Sports Center (618); Providence, RI
February 11, 2023; 2:00 p.m.		at Cornell	W 76–48	10–12 (3–7)	Newman Arena (291); Ithaca, NY
February 17, 2023; 7:00 p.m.		Princeton; Black History Month Game	L 37–80	10–13 (3–8)	Pizzitola Sports Center (326); Providence, RI
February 18, 2023; 5:00 p.m.		Penn; Equality & Inclusion Night, Alumnae Night	W 68–59	11–14 (4–9)	Pizzitola Sports Center (344); Providence, RI
February 25, 2023; 4:00 p.m.		No. RV Columbia; Senior Day	L 55–83	11–14 (4–9)	Pizzitola Sports Center (427); Providence, RI
March 4, 2023; 2:00 p.m.		at Yale	L 53–63	11–15 (4–10)	John J. Lee Amphitheater (479); New Haven, CT
*Non-conference game. ^{#}Rankings from AP poll. (#) Tournament seedings in parentheses. All times are in Eastern.

== See also ==
- 2022–23 Brown Bears men's basketball team
