= 2022–23 Penn Quakers women's basketball team =

Intercollegiate basketball season

2022–23 Penn Quakers women's basketball

WNIT, first round
- Conference: Ivy League
- Record: 17–12 (9–5 Ivy)
- Head coach: Mike McLaughlin (13th season)
- Assistant coaches: Kelly Killion; Ashley Robinson; Jim Ricci
- Home arena: Palestra

2022–23 Ivy League women's basketball standings
	Conf.				Overall
Team	W		L	PCT	W		L	PCT
Columbia	12	–	2	.857	26	–	5	.839
Princeton†	12	–	2	.857	24	–	6	.800
Harvard	9	–	5	.643	20	–	11	.645
Penn	9	–	5	.643	17	–	12	.586
Yale	7	–	7	.500	13	–	14	.481
Brown	4	–	10	.286	11	–	15	.423
Cornell	3	–	11	.214	10	–	17	.370
Dartmouth	0	–	14	.000	2	–	26	.071
† 2023 Ivy League tournament winner As of March 24, 2023

The 2022–23 Penn Quakers women's basketball team represented the University of Pennsylvania during the 2022–23 NCAA Division I women's basketball season. The Quakers, led by thirteenth-year head coach Mike McLaughlin, played their home games at the Palestra in Philadelphia, Pennsylvania as members of the Ivy League. The Quakers qualified for the Ivy League women's tournament for the fourth time but lost to Princeton in the semifinals. They lost to Richmond in the first round of the 2023 WNIT.

== Previous season ==
Penn finished the 2021–22 season 12–14, 7–7 in Ivy League play. They failed to qualify for the 2022 Ivy League women's basketball tournament.

== Roster ==
2022–23 Penn Quakers women's basketball team
Players
Coaches

Pos.	#	Name	Height	Year	Previous school	Hometown
F	0	Jordan Obi	6 ft 1 in (1.85 m)	Jr	Choate Rosemary Hall	Cupertino, CA
G	2	Marianna Papazoglou	5 ft 10 in (1.78 m)	So	Wildwood Catholic Academy	Wildwood, NJ
F	3	Iyanna Rogers	6 ft 1 in (1.85 m)	So	Highland Springs	Richmond, VA
PG	4	Saniah Caldwell	5 ft 9 in (1.75 m)	Fr	Saddle River Day School	Franklin Lakes, NJ
G	5	Stina Almqvist	6 ft 1 in (1.85 m)	So	Marks Gymnasium	Kinna, Sweden
G	10	Mandy McGurk (C)	5 ft 6 in (1.68 m)	Sr	Notre Dame de Namur	West Chester, PA
G	11	Simone Sawyer	5 ft 11 in (1.8 m)	Fr	Stevenson High School	Lincolnshire, IL
G	12	Michaela Stanfield	5 ft 11 in (1.8 m)	Jr	The Winsor School	Needham, MA
F	14	Floor Toonders	6 ft 4 in (1.93 m)	Jr	Calandlyceum Amsterdam	Wageningen, Netherlands
G	15	Georgia Heine	6 ft 0 in (1.83 m)	Fr	Manasquan	Spring Lake Heights, NJ
C	20	Faye Parker	6 ft 3 in (1.91 m)	Sr	Tabor Academy	Swampscott, MA
G	21	Isabel Gomez	5 ft 9 in (1.75 m)	Fr	Sage Hill	Newport Beach, CA
G	22	Sydnei Caldwell	5 ft 9 in (1.75 m)	Sr	Saddle River Day School	Franklin Lakes, NJ
F	24	Helena Lasic	6 ft 4 in (1.93 m)	Fr	Westtown School	Brampton, Ontario
F	25	Silke Milliman	6 ft 1 in (1.85 m)	Sr	Northfield Mount Hermon	Hanover, NH
C	30	Ella Ray	6 ft 3 in (1.91 m)	Fr	Oak Ridge High School	El Dorado Hills, CA
G	32	Lizzy Groetsch	5 ft 10 in (1.78 m)	So	North Allegheny	Sewickley, PA
G	45	Kayla Padilla (C)	5 ft 9 in (1.75 m)	Sr	Bishop Montgomery	Torrance, CA

Head coach

- Mike McLaughlin (Holy Family)

Assistant coach(es)

- Kelly Killion (Holy Family)
- Ashley Robinson (Saint Joseph's)
- Jim Ricci (La Salle)

Legend

- (C) Team captain
- (S) Suspended
- (I) Ineligible
- (W) Walk-on
- Injured
- Current redshirt

Roster
Last update: March 11, 2023

2022–23 Ivy awards and recognition
- Kayla Padilla – First Team All-Ivy
- Jordan Obi – Second Team All-Ivy
- Kennedy Suttle – Academic All-Ivy

== Schedule ==
Date time, TV	Rank^{#}	Opponent^{#}	Result	Record	Site (attendance) city, state
Regular season
November 10, 2022*; 7:00 p.m., ESPN+		at Marist	W 65–61	1–0	McCann Arena (974); Poughkeepsie, NY
November 13, 2023*; 1:00 p.m., B1G+		at Northwestern	L 55–63	1–1	Welsh–Ryan Arena (860); Evanston, IL
November 15, 2022*; 7:00 p.m., ESPN+		at Saint Joseph's	L 50–57	1–2	Hagan Arena (388); Philadelphia, PA
November 17, 2022*; 7:00 p.m., ESPN+/ NBC Sports Philadelphia+		No. 24 Villanova; Palestra Pride Game	L 41–67	1–3	Palestra (362); Philadelphia, PA
November 21, 2022*; 2:00 p.m., WCC Network		at San Francisco	L 65–73	1–4	Sobrato Center (414); San Francisco, CA
November 23, 2022*; 5:00 p.m., USC live stream		at USC	L 60–66	1–5	Galen Center (689); Los Angeles, CA
November 29, 2022*; 6:30 p.m., ESPN+		at La Salle	W 72–59	2–5	Tom Gola Arena (361); Philadelphia, PA
December 1, 2022*; 7:00 p.m., ESPN+		Stony Brook; Penn Medicine/Chop Appreciation Night	W 73–53	3–5	Palestra (449); Philadelphia PA
December 6, 2022*; 7:00 p.m., ESPN+		Bucknell; Faculty Appreciation Night	W 68–62 ^{OT}	4–5	Palestra (327); Philadelphia, PA
December 8, 2022*; 7:00 p.m., ESPN+		St. Francis Brooklyn; Mental Health Awareness/ Student-Athlete Appreciation Night	W 78–44	5–5	Palestra (211); Philadelphia, PA
December 11, 2022*; 12:00 p.m., ESPN+		Temple; Young Quakers Kick-Off/Toys for Tots	W 62–61	6–5	Palestra (637); Philadelphia, PA
December 30, 2022*; 2:00 p.m., ESPN+		Gwynedd Mercy; Community Day/Teacher Appreciation Game	W 95–38	7–5	Palestra (487); Philadelphia, PA
Ivy League regular season
January 2, 2023; 2:00 p.m., ESPN+		Brown; Penn Faculty/Staff Game	W 74–53	8–5 (1–0)	Palestra (533); Philadelphia, PA
January 6, 2023; 6:00 p.m., ESPN+		Cornell; CYO/Youth/Camper Reunion Night	W 62–54	9–5 (2–0)	Palestra (547); Philadelphia, PA
January 7, 2023; 5:00 p.m., ESPN+		Columbia; Alumnae Day	W 71–67	10–5 (3–0)	Palestra (678); Philadelphia, PA
January 10, 2023*; 7:00 p.m., ESPN+		Hartford	W 76–30	11–5	Palestra (159); Philadelphia, PA
January 14, 2023; 2:00 p.m., ESPN+		Dartmouth; We Stand Together	W 69–57	12–5 (4–0)	Palestra (709); Philadelphia, PA
January 16, 2023; 2:00 p.m., ESPN+/ NBC Sports Philadelphia+		at Princeton	L 40–55	12–6 (4–1)	Jadwin Gymnasium (1,018); Princeton, NJ
January 21, 2023; 2:00 p.m., ESPN+		Yale; Fres Family Game/Play4Kay	W 79–57	13–6 (5–1)	Palestra (597); Philadelphia, PA
January 28, 2023; 2:00 p.m., ESPN+		at Harvard	L 60–84	13–7 (5–2)	Lavietes Pavilion (1,385); Cambridge, MA
February 3, 2023; 6:00 p.m., ESPN+		at Columbia	L 50–72	13–8 (5–3)	Levien Gymnasium (2,111); New York, NY
February 4, 2023; 4:00 p.m., ESPN+		at Cornell	W 67–54	14–8 (6–3)	Newman Arena; Ithaca, NY
February 11, 2023; 2:00 p.m., ESPN+/ NBC Sports Philadelphia+		Harvard; Equity & Inclusion/NGWS Game	W 70–64	15–8 (7–3)	Palestra (1,132); Philadelphia, PA
February 17, 2023; 6:00 p.m., ESPN+		at Yale	W 72–58	16–8 (8–3)	John J. Lee Amphitheater (403); New Haven, CT
February 18, 2023; 5:00 p.m., ESPN3		at Brown	L 59–68	16–9 (8–4)	Pizzitola Sports Center (344); Providence, RI
February 25, 2023; 2:00 p.m., ESPN3		at Dartmouth	W 54–37	17–9 (9–4)	Leede Arena (737); Hanover, NH
March 3, 2023; 7:00 p.m., ESPN+/ NBC Sports Philadelphia+		Princeton; Senior Night	L 52–71	17–10 (9–5)	Palestra (2,671); Philadelphia, PA
Ivy League women's tournament
March 10, 2023; 4:30 p.m., ESPN+	(4)	vs. (1) Princeton; Semifinals	L 47–60	17–11	Jadwin Gymnasium (2,238); Princeton, NJ
WNIT
March 16, 2023; 6:00 p.m., ESPN3		at Richmond; First round	L 52–75	17–12	Robins Center (557); Richmond, VA
*Non-conference game. ^{#}Rankings from AP poll. (#) Tournament seedings in parentheses. All times are in Eastern.

== See also ==
- 2022–23 Penn Quakers men's basketball team
