= 2022–23 Harvard Crimson women's basketball team =

Intercollegiate basketball season

2022–23 Harvard Crimson women's basketball

WNIT Great 8 vs. Columbia, L 71–77
- Conference: Ivy League
- Record: 20–12 (9–5 Ivy)
- Head coach: Carrie Moore (1st season)
- Assistant coaches: Ali Sanders; Steve Harney; Ariel Gaston
- Home arena: Lavietes Pavilion

2022–23 Ivy League women's basketball standings
	Conf.				Overall
Team	W		L	PCT	W		L	PCT
Columbia	12	–	2	.857	26	–	5	.839
Princeton†	12	–	2	.857	24	–	6	.800
Harvard	9	–	5	.643	20	–	11	.645
Penn	9	–	5	.643	17	–	12	.586
Yale	7	–	7	.500	13	–	14	.481
Brown	4	–	10	.286	11	–	15	.423
Cornell	3	–	11	.214	10	–	17	.370
Dartmouth	0	–	14	.000	2	–	26	.071
† 2023 Ivy League tournament winner As of March 24, 2023

The 2022–23 Harvard Crimson women's basketball team represented Harvard University during the 2022–23 NCAA Division I women's basketball season. The Crimson, led by first-year head coach Carrie Moore, played their home games at the Lavietes Pavilion in Boston, Massachusetts as members of the Ivy League. The Crimson qualified for the Ivy League women's tournament for the fifth season in a row. They advanced to the championship game for the first time in program history after defeating Columbia but fell to Princeton in the championship game. The Crimson accepted a bid to the 2023 Women's National Invitation Tournament, where they advanced to the Great 8 for the first time in program history, but lost to Columbia 71–77.

== Previous season ==
The Crimson finished the 2021–22 season 13–14, 7–7 in Ivy League play, to finish in fourth place. They qualified for the 2022 Ivy League women's basketball tournament but lost to Princeton in the semifinals.

== Roster ==
2022–23 Harvard Crimson women's basketball team
Players
Coaches

Pos.	#	Name	Height	Year	Previous school	Hometown
G	0	McKenzie Forbes (C)	6 ft 0 in (1.83 m)	Sr	Folsom	Folsom, CA
G	3	Kennedy Heath	5 ft 9 in (1.75 m)	Jr	Panther Creek	Cary, NC
G	5	Gabby Anderson	5 ft 11 in (1.8 m)	Fr	IMG Academy	Columbus, OH
G	10	Elena Rodriguez	6 ft 2 in (1.88 m)	So	IES Joaquín Artiles	Agüimes, Spain
G	11	Maggie McCarthy (C)	5 ft 10 in (1.78 m)	Sr	Medfield	Medfield, MA
G	14	Harmoni Turner	5 ft 10 in (1.78 m)	So	Mansfield Legacy	Mansfield, TX
F	15	Katie Lebuhn	6 ft 3 in (1.91 m)	Fr	Irvington	Irvington, NY
G	20	Lola Mullaney	5 ft 11 in (1.8 m)	Jr	Manasquan	Rumson, NJ
G	22	Saniyah Glenn-Bello	6 ft 0 in (1.83 m)	Fr	Christ the King	Staten Island, NY
G	23	Gabby Donaldson	5 ft 6 in (1.68 m)	Sr	Wakefield	Raleigh, NC
F	30	Lindsey Lawson	6 ft 3 in (1.91 m)	Jr	Cazenovia	Cazenovia, NY
F	31	Katie Krupa	6 ft 1 in (1.85 m)	Fr	Morton	Morton, IL
G	32	Elle Stauffer	5 ft 11 in (1.8 m)	So	Germantown Academy	Doylestown, PA
G	33	Annie Stritzel	5 ft 10 in (1.78 m)	Sr	Nazareth Academy	Chicago, IL

Head coach

- Carrie Moore (Western Michigan)

Assistant coach(es)

- Ali Sanders (Florida Southern)
- Steve Harney (Dickinson)
- Ariel Gaston (New Hampshire)

Legend

- (C) Team captain
- (S) Suspended
- (I) Ineligible
- (W) Walk-on
- Injured
- Current redshirt

Roster
Last update: March 11, 2023

2022–23 Ivy awards and recognition
- Harmoni Turner – First Team All-Ivy
- Lola Mullaney – Second Team All-Ivy
- Maggie McCarthy – Academic All-Ivy
- Elena Rodriguez – Honorable Mention

== Schedule ==
Date time, TV	Rank^{#}	Opponent^{#}	Result	Record	Site (attendance) city, state
Non-conference regular season
November 7, 2022*; 7:00 p.m., ESPN+		Rhode Island	W 88–74	1–0	Lavietes Pavilion (465); Boston, MA
November 10, 2022; 7:00 p.m., ESPN+		Boston College	W 68–59	2–0	Lavietes Pavilion (541); Boston, MA
November 18, 2022*; 7:00 p.m., ESPN+		UMass	L 67–77	2–1	Lavietes Pavilion (695); Boston, MA
November 21, 2022*; 7:00 p.m., NEC Front Row		at Merrimack	W 85–43	3–1	Hammel Court (167); North Andover, MA
November 24, 2022*; 1:30 p.m., FloHoops		vs. Purdue; Cancún Challenge	L 63–85	3–2	Hard Rock Hotel Riviera Maya (200); Cancún, Mexico
November 25, 2022*; 11:00 a.m., FloHoops		vs. Oklahoma State; Cancún Challenge	L 62–71	3–3	Hard Rock Hotel Riviera Maya (113); Cancún, Mexico
November 26, 2022*; 11:00 a.m., FloHoops		vs. Florida State; Cancún Challenge	L 57–88	3–4	Hard Rock Hotel Riviera Maya (107); Cancún, Mexico
November 30, 2022*; 7:00 p.m., ESPN+		UMass Lowell	W 86–66	4–4	Lavietes Pavilion (100); Boston, MA
December 3, 2022*; 3:00 p.m., NESN/ESPN+		Colgate	W 62–48	5–4	Lavietes Pavilion (588); Boston, MA
December 5, 2022*; 5:00 p.m., NESN/FloHoops		at Northeastern	L 64–73	5–5	Cabot Center (187); Boston, MA
December 18, 2022*; 3:00 p.m., NESN/ESPN+		Maine	W 84–56	6–5	Lavietes Pavilion (679); Boston, MA
December 21, 2022*; 4:00 p.m., ESPN+		at Boston University	W 73–58	7–5	Case Gym; Boston, MA
Ivy League regular season
December 31, 2022; 6:00 p.m., ESPNews		Princeton	W 67–59	8–5 (1–0)	Lavietes Pavilion (1,278); Boston, MA
January 6, 2023; 6:00 p.m., ESPN+		Brown	W 89–59	9–5 (2–0)	Lavietes Pavilion (708); Boston, MA
January 7, 2023; 7:00 p.m., ESPN+		Yale	L 70–71	9–6 (2–1)	Lavietes Pavilion (867); Boston, MA
January 14, 2023; 12:00 p.m., ESPN+		at Columbia	L 56–82	9–7 (2–2)	Levien Gymnasium (1,127); New York, NY
January 16, 2023; 5:00 p.m., ESPN+		at Dartmouth	W 68–52	10–7 (3–2)	Leede Arena (335); Hanover, NH
January 21, 2023; 2:00 p.m., ESPN+		at Cornell	W 66–53	11–7 (4–2)	Newman Arena (468); Ithaca, NY
January 28, 2023; 2:00 p.m., ESPN+		Penn	W 84–60	12–7 (5–2)	Lavietes Pavilion (1,385); Boston, MA
February 3, 2023; 6:00 p.m., ESPN+		at Yale	W 67–54	13–7 (6–2)	John J. Lee Amphitheater (600); New Haven, CT
February 4, 2023; 5:00 p.m., ESPN+		at Brown	W 74–61	14–7 (7–2)	Pizzitola Sports Center (618); Providence, RI
February 11, 2023; 2:00 p.m., ESPN+		at Penn	L 64–70	14–8 (7–3)	Palestra (1,132); Philadelphia, PA
February 17, 2023; 6:00 p.m., ESPN+		Columbia	L 70–75	14–9 (7–4)	Lavietes Pavilion (1,065); Boston, MA
February 18, 2023; 5:00 p.m., ESPN3		Cornell	W 86–59	15–9 (8–4)	Lavietes Pavilion (961); Boston, MA
February 24, 2023; 6:00 p.m., ESPN+		at Princeton	L 47–51	15–10 (8–5)	Jadwin Gymnasium (1,744); Princeton, NJ
March 4, 2023; 4:00 p.m., ESPN+		Dartmouth	W 64–40	16–10 (9–5)	Lavietes Pavilion (956); Boston, MA
Ivy League tournament
March 10, 2023; 7:00 p.m., ESPN+	(3)	vs. (2) Columbia; Semifinals	W 72–65 ^{OT}	17–10	Jadwin Gymnasium; Princeton, NJ
March 11, 2023; 5:00 p.m., ESPNews/ESPN+	(3)	vs. (1) Princeton; Championship game	L 48–54	17–11	Jadwin Gymnasium; Princeton, NJ
WNIT
March 16, 2023; 7:00 p.m., ESPN3		Towson; First round	W 103–63	18–11	Lavietes Pavilion (345); Boston, MA
March 20, 2023; 7:00 p.m., ESPN3		at UMass; Second round	W 89–87	19–11	Mullins Center (1,195); Amherst, MA
March 23, 2023; 7:00 p.m., ESPN3		Rhode Island; Super 16	W 74–63	20–11	Lavietes Pavilion (680); Boston, MA
March 26, 2023; 4:00 p.m., ESPN3		at Columbia; Great 8	L 71–77	20–12	Levien Gymnasium (1,689); New York, NY
*Non-conference game. ^{#}Rankings from AP poll. (#) Tournament seedings in parentheses. All times are in Eastern.

== See also ==
- 2022–23 Harvard Crimson men's basketball team
