= Adrienne Shibles =

American Basketball Coach

Current position
- Title: Associate Director of Athletics / SWA
- Team: Bates
- Conference: NESCAC

Biographical details
- Education: Bates College BA; Smith College MS

Playing career
- 1987-1991: Bates

Coaching career (HC unless noted)
- 1996-2005: Swarthmore College
- 2008-2021: Bowdoin
- 2021-2023: Dartmouth

Head coaching record
- Overall: 424–212 (.667)

Accomplishments and honors

Championships
- 2× NCAA Runner-Up (2018, 2019); 2× NCAA Regional - Final Four (2018, 2019); 2× NESCAC (2009, 2020); Centennial Conference (2001)

Awards
- 2019 DIII National Coach of the Year; 2× Regional Coach of the Year (2018, 2019); 2× NESCAC Coach of the Year (2009, 2019)

Adrienne Shibles is an American former women's basketball coach who was most recently head coach of the Dartmouth Big Green women's basketball team. Currently Shibles is the associate director of athletics at Bates College in Maine.

== Playing career ==
Shibles played collegiately at Bates College in Lewiston, Maine. At Bates, she scored more than 1,000 career points.

== Coaching career ==
=== Bowdoin ===
She coached the Bowdoin Polar Bears women's basketball team to a 281-68 (.805) record, two New England Small College Athletic Conference championships, 11 NCAA Tournament appearances, and back-to-back NCAA Division III title game appearances. Shibles stepped down in May 2021 and left Bowdoin as the winningest coach in the programs history.

== Head coaching record ==
Record table
Season	Team	Overall	Conference	Standing	Postseason
Swarthmore Garnet (Centennial Conference) (1996–2005)
1996–97	Swarthmore	7–16	4–11		
1997–98	Swarthmore	8–16	4–11		
1998–99	Swarthmore	12–12	7–8		
1999–2000	Swarthmore	14–11	9–4		
2000–01	Swarthmore	23–5	12–3	1st	NCAA Second Round
2001–02	Swarthmore	21–8	12–3		
2002–03	Swarthmore	21–8	12–3		
2003–04	Swarthmore	16–9	11–7		
2004–05	Swarthmore	16–11	11–7		
Swarthmore:		138–96 (.590)			
Bowdoin Polar Bears (New England Small College Athletic Conference) (2008–2021)
2008–09	Bowdoin	24–5	8–1	T–1st	NCAA Second Round
2009–10	Bowdoin	22-7	5–4	5th	NCAA Sweet Sixteen
2010–11	Bowdoin	24–6	6–3	T–3rd	NCAA Sweet Sixteen
2011–12	Bowdoin	21–8	7–3	3rd	NCAA Sweet Sixteen
2012–13	Bowdoin	14–11	4–6	8th	
2013–14	Bowdoin	21–6	7–3	3rd	NCAA First Round
2014–15	Bowdoin	25–5	9–1	2nd	NCAA Sweet Sixteen
2015–16	Bowdoin	22–7	8–2	3rd	NCAA Sweet Sixteen
2016–17	Bowdoin	21–5	8–2	3rd	NCAA First Round
2017–18	Bowdoin	29–3	9–1	2nd	NCAA Runner–Up
2018–19	Bowdoin	31–2	10–0	1st	NCAA Runner–Up
2019–20	Bowdoin	27–2	8–2	T–2nd	NCAA Sweet Sixteen*
Bowdoin:		281–68 (.805)			
Dartmouth Big Green (Ivy League) (2021–2023)
2021–22	Dartmouth	3–23	2–12	7th	
2022–23	Dartmouth	2–26	0–14	8th	
Dartmouth:		5–49 (.093)	2–26 (.071)		
Total:		424–212 (.667)			
National champion Postseason invitational champion Conference regular season champion Conference regular season and conference tournament champion Division regular season champion Division regular season and conference tournament champion Conference tournament champion

== Personal life ==
Shibles is from Knox, Maine and graduated from Mount View High School in Thorndike, Maine. In August 2022, she was inducted into the Maine Basketball Hall of Fame.
