= 2021–22 Princeton Tigers women's basketball team =

Intercollegiate basketball season

2021–22 Princeton Tigers women's basketball

Ivy League regular-season champions Ivy League tournament champions

NCAA tournament, second round
- Conference: Ivy League

Ranking
- AP: No. 25
- Record: 25–5 (14–0 Ivy)
- Head coach: Carla Berube (3rd season)
- Assistant coaches: Lauren Battista (3rd season); Lauren Dillon (3rd season)
- Home arena: Jadwin Gymnasium

2021–22 Ivy League women's basketball standings
	Conf.				Overall
Team	W		L	PCT	W		L	PCT
No. 25 Princeton †	14	–	0	1.000	25	–	5	.833
Columbia	12	–	2	.857	25	–	7	.781
Yale	9	–	5	.643	16	–	11	.593
Harvard	7	–	7	.500	13	–	14	.481
Penn	7	–	7	.500	12	–	14	.462
Cornell	4	–	10	.286	9	–	16	.360
Dartmouth	2	–	12	.143	3	–	23	.115
Brown	1	–	13	.071	6	–	20	.231
† 2022 Ivy League tournament winner Rankings from AP poll

The 2021–22 Princeton Tigers women's basketball team represented Princeton University during the 2021–22 NCAA Division I women's basketball season. The Tigers, led by third-year head coach Carla Berube, played their home games at Jadwin Gymnasium as members of the Ivy League.

The Tigers finished the season with a 25–5 overall record, 14–0 in Ivy League play, to finish in first place and win the conference's regular-season championship. As the top seed in the Ivy League tournament, they defeated Harvard and Columbia to win the championship. They received an automatic bid to the NCAA tournament, where they were the eleventh seed in the Bridgeport region. They defeated Kentucky in the first round before losing to Indiana to end their season.

== Previous season ==
The Ivy League canceled all winter sports for the 2020–21 season, including men's and women's basketball, due to COVID-19 concerns.

== Roster ==
2021–22 Princeton Tigers women's basketball team
Players
Coaches

Pos.	#	Name	Height	Year	Hometown
F	00	Ellie Mitchell	6 ft 1 in (1.85 m)	So	Chevy Chase, MD
G	1	Abby Meyers	6 ft 0 in (1.83 m)	Sr	Potomac, MD
G	2	Adaora Nwokeji	5 ft 8 in (1.73 m)	Fr	Houston, TX
F	5	Paige Morton	6 ft 3 in (1.91 m)	Fr	Summit, NJ
G	10	Grace Stone	5 ft 11 in (1.8 m)	Jr	Glen Cove, NY
G/F	11	Neenah Young	5 ft 10 in (1.78 m)	Sr	Tracy, CA
G	12	Maggie Connolly	5 ft 8 in (1.73 m)	Jr	Wilmington, DE
G/F	14	Maddie Plank	5 ft 11 in (1.8 m)	So	Briarcliff Manor, NY
G	20	Kaitlyn Chen	5 ft 9 in (1.75 m)	So	San Marino, CA
F	21	Kira Emsbo	6 ft 5 in (1.96 m)	Jr	Lakewood, CO
F	22	Parker Hill	6 ft 4 in (1.93 m)	Fr	Bethesda, MD
G	24	Julia Cunningham	5 ft 11 in (1.8 m)	Jr	Watchung, NJ
G	25	Chet Nweke	6 ft 0 in (1.83 m)	So	Woodbine, MD
G	32	Amelia Osgood	5 ft 9 in (1.75 m)	Fr	Brentwood, TN
G/F	33	Lexi Weger	6 ft 3 in (1.91 m)	Jr	South Hadley, MA
F	44	Katie Thiers	6 ft 2 in (1.88 m)	Fr	Seattle, WA

Head coach

- Carla Berube (Connecticut)

Assistant coach(es)

- Lauren Battista (Bentley)
- Lauren Dillon (Tufts)

Legend

- (C) Team captain
- (S) Suspended
- (I) Ineligible
- (W) Walk-on
- Injured
- Current redshirt

Roster
Last update: May 13, 2022

2021–22 Ivy awards and recognition
- Abby Meyers – Player of the Year; First Team All-Ivy; Academic All-Ivy
- Ellie Mitchell – Defensive Player of the Year
- Carla Berube – Coach of the Year
- Julia Cunningham – First Team All-Ivy
- Grace Stone – Honorable Mention

== Schedule ==
Date time, TV	Rank^{#}	Opponent^{#}	Result	Record	Site (attendance) city, state
Regular season
November 10, 2021*; 7:00 p.m.		at Villanova	W 59–42	1–0	Finneran Pavilion (1,551); Villanova, PA
November 12, 2021*; 7:00 p.m., FloHoops		at Delaware	W 76–56	2–0	Bob Carpenter Center (997); Newark, DE
November 14, 2021*; 1:00 p.m., ESPN+		Boston	W 69–40	3–0	Jadwin Gymnasium (728); Princeton, NJ
November 20, 2021*; 1:00 p.m., ESPN+		at Rhode Island	L 53–61	3–1	Ryan Center (545); Kingston, RI
November 23, 2021*; 7:00 p.m., ESPN+		at Temple	W 59–41	4–1	Liacouras Center (780); Philadelphia, PA
November 28, 2021*; 1:00 p.m., ESPN+		Maine	W 82–43	5–1	Jadwin Gymnasium (534); Princeton, NJ
December 1, 2021*; 7:00 p.m., ESPN+		at No. 22 Florida Gulf Coast	W 58–55	6–1	Alico Arena (2,045); Fort Myers, FL
December 5, 2021*; 1:00 p.m., ESPN+		at Fordham	L 67–76	6–2	Rose Hill Gymnasium (303); The Bronx, NY
December 11, 2021*; Noon, ESPN+		Seton Hall	L 60–70	6–3	Jadwin Gymnasium (586); Princeton, NJ
December 14, 2021*; 7:00 p.m., ESPN+		Buffalo	W 79–77 ^{OT}	7–3	Jadwin Gymnasium (537); Princeton, NJ
December 22, 2021*; Noon, ESPN+		No. 12 Texas	L 53–70	7–4	Jadwin Gymnasium (722); Princeton, NJ
December 29, 2021*; 5:00 p.m., ESPN+		UCF	Canceled		Jadwin Gymnasium; Princeton, NJ
January 2, 2022; 2:00 p.m., ESPN+		at Harvard	W 68–50	8–4 (1–0)	Jadwin Gymnasium (635); Princeton, NJ
January 8, 2022; 4:00 p.m., ESPN+		at Cornell	W 65–41	9–4 (2–0)	Newman Arena (189); Ithaca, NY
January 12, 2022*; 6:00 p.m., NBC Sports PA+		Towson	W 68–54	10–4	Jadwin Gymnasium (57); Princeton, NJ
January 15, 2022; 4:00 p.m., ESPN+		at Brown	W 72–39	11–4 (3–0)	Pizzitola Sports Center (163); Providence, RI
January 17, 2022; 2:00 p.m., ESPN+		at Penn	W 70–50	12–4 (4–0)	The Palestra (125); Philadelphia, PA
January 22, 2022; 2:00 p.m., ESPN+		Dartmouth	W 78–35	13–4 (5–0)	Jadwin Gymnasium (165); Princeton, NJ
January 28, 2022; 7:00 p.m., ESPN+		at Yale	W 61–49	14–4 (6–0)	Payne Whitney Gymnasium (60); New Haven, CT
February 4, 2022; 7:00 p.m., ESPN+		Cornell	W 75–37	15–4 (7–0)	Jadwin Gymnasium (501); Princeton, NJ
February 5, 2022; 5:00 p.m., ESPN+		Columbia	W 57–39	16–4 (8–0)	Jadwin Gymnasium (906); Princeton, NJ
February 12, 2022; 2:00 p.m., ESPN+		at Dartmouth	W 70–48	17–4 (9–0)	Leede Arena (0); Hanover, NH
February 18, 2022; 7:00 p.m., ESPN+		Brown	W 88–42	18–4 (10–0)	Jadwin Gymnasium (572); Princeton, NJ
February 19, 2022; 6:00 p.m., NBC Sports PA		Yale	W 74–36	19–4 (11–0)	Jadwin Gymnasium (797); Princeton, NJ
February 23, 2022; 5:00 p.m., ESPNU		at Columbia	W 73–53	20–4 (12–0)	Levien Gymnasium (1,913); New York, NY
March 4, 2022; 7:00 p.m., ESPNews		Penn	W 63–43	21–4 (13–0)	Jadwin Gymnasium (846); Princeton, NJ
March 6, 2022; Noon, ESPN+		at Harvard	W 73–53	22–4 (14–0)	Lavietes Pavilion (757); Cambridge, MA
Ivy League tournament
March 12, 2022; 4:30 p.m., ESPN+	(1) No. 24	at (4) Harvard; Semifinals	W 72–67	23–4	Lavietes Pavilion (889); Cambridge, MA
March 13, 2022; 5:00 p.m., ESPNews	(1) No. 24	vs. (2) Columbia; Finals	W 77–59	24–4	Lavietes Pavilion (925); Cambridge, MA
NCAA tournament
March 19, 2022; 4:00 p.m., ESPN	(11 B) No. 25	vs. (6 B) No. 15 Kentucky; First round	W 69–62	25–4	Simon Skjodt Assembly Hall (6,389); Bloomington, IN
March 2022; 8:00 p.m., ESPNU	(11 B) No. 25	at (3 B) No. 11 Indiana; Second round	L 55–56	25–5	Simon Skjodt Assembly Hall (9,627); Bloomington, IN
*Non-conference game. ^{#}Rankings from AP poll. (#) Tournament seedings in parentheses. B=Bridgeport. All times are in Eastern.

== Rankings ==
Ranking movements Legend: ██ Increase in ranking ██ Decrease in ranking — = Not ranked RV = Received votes
	Week																		
Poll	Pre	1	2	3	4	5	6	7	8	9	10	11	12	13	14	15	16	17	Final
AP	—	—	—	—	—	—	—	—	—	—	—	—	—	RV	RV	RV	RV	24	25
Coaches	—	—	—	—	RV	—	—	—	—	—	—	—	—	—	—	—	RV	RV	RV

Legend
	Increase in ranking
	Decrease in ranking
	Not ranked previous week
(RV)	Received votes
(NR)	Not ranked and did not receive votes

The Coaches Poll did not release a Week 2 poll and the AP poll did not release a poll after the NCAA tournament.
