= 2022–23 Hartford Hawks women's basketball team =

Intercollegiate basketball season

2022–23 Hartford Hawks women's basketball
- Conference: Independent
- Record: 2–26
- Head coach: Polly Thomason (1st season)
- Assistant coaches: Meredith Mesaris; Katie Korioth
- Home arena: Chase Arena at Reich Family Pavilion

2022–23 NCAA Division I women's basketball independents standings
	Conf.				Overall
Team	W		L	PCT	W		L	PCT
Chicago State	0	–	0	–	6	–	22	.214
Hartford	0	–	0	–	2	–	26	.071
As of March 5, 2023; Rankings from AP Poll

The 2022–23 Hartford Hawks women's basketball team represented the University of Hartford in the 2022–23 NCAA Division I women's basketball season.

== Roster ==
2022–23 Hartford Hawks women's basketball team
Players
Coaches

Pos.	#	Name	Height	Year	Hometown
F	0	Elena Houghton	6 ft 1 in (1.85 m)	Fr	Washington, D.C
G	1	Zaiha Minnis	5 ft 10 in (1.78 m)	Fr	Clinton, Md
G	2	Jasmine Barnes	5 ft 7 in (1.7 m)	Fr	Plano, Texas
G	3	Paige Loughman	5 ft 11 in (1.8 m)	Fr	Bernardston, Mass.
G	5	Abigail Cherry	5 ft 8 in (1.73 m)	Fr	Randolph, Mass.
G	11	Ta'Nya Outten	5 ft 8 in (1.73 m)	So	North Chesterfield, Va.
G	12	Lanae Johnson-Kleinpeter	5 ft 8 in (1.73 m)	Jr	Fort Worth, Texas
G	13	Nayeli Dowding	5 ft 5 in (1.65 m)	So	Baldwin, N.Y.
F	14	Lenaijah Ferguson	6 ft 0 in (1.83 m)	So	Baltimore, Md.
G	15	Irene Primo	5 ft 4 in (1.63 m)	Sr	Tres Cantos, Spain
G	24	Kymilondra Nance	5 ft 8 in (1.73 m)	Jr	Dunkirk, N.Y.
G	30	Tatum Forbes	5 ft 8 in (1.73 m)	Fr	Pawtucket, R.I.
G	31	Siena Hallberg	5 ft 7 in (1.7 m)	Fr	Schenectady, N.Y.

Head coach

- Polly Thomason (Austin College)

Assistant coach(es)

Legend

- (C) Team captain
- (S) Suspended
- (I) Ineligible
- (W) Walk-on
- Injured
- Current redshirt

Roster
Last update: April 15, 2023

== Schedule and results ==
Date time, TV	Rank^{#}	Opponent^{#}	Result	Record	Site (attendance) city, state
Regular season
November 7, 2022*; 7:00 pm		at Sacred Heart	L 34–72	0–1	William H. Pitt Center (423); Fairfield, CT
November 12, 2022*; 2:00 pm		LIU	L 54–70	0–2	Chase Arena (227); West Hartford, CT
November 14, 2022*; 6:00 pm		at Quinnipiac	L 30–85	0–3	M&T Bank Arena (345); Hamden, CT
November 19, 2022*; 2:00 pm		at Boston University	L 45–73	0–4	Case Gym (521); Boston, MA
November 21, 2022*; 6:00 pm		at Stonehill	L 35–62	0–5	Merkert Gymnasium; Easton, MA
November 25, 2022*; 1:00 pm		at Providence; Friar Thanksgiving Classic	L 30–60	0–6	Alumni Hall (459); Providence, RI
November 26, 2022*; 1:00 pm		vs. Bryant; Friar Thanksgiving Classic	L 46–74	0–7	Alumni Hall (250); Providence, RI
November 27, 2022*; 12:00 pm		vs. Weber State; Friar Thanksgiving Classic	L 44–71	0–8	Alumni Hall (201); Providence, RI
December 3, 2022*; 12:00 pm		at Brown	L 52–68	0–9	Pizzitola Sports Center (187); Providence, RI
December 5, 2022*; 7:00 pm		Cornell	L 38–89	0–10	Chase Arena (228); West Hartford, CT
December 7, 2022*; 11:00 am		at Rhode Island	L 34–88	0–11	Ryan Center (3,800); Kingston, RI
December 18, 2022*; 2:00 pm		Central Connecticut; Rivalry	L 55–69	0–12	Chase Arena (215); West Hartford, CT
December 20, 2022*; 6:00 pm		Binghamton	L 34–70	0–13	Binghamton University Events Center (966); Vestal, NY
December 22, 2022*; 2:00 pm		UMBC	L 52–76	0–14	Chase Arena (118); West Hartford, CT
December 30, 2022*; 7:00 pm		at Saint Francis	L 36–46	0–15	DeGol Arena (148); Loretto, PA
January 2, 2023*; 2:00 pm		at La Salle	L 30–77	0–16	Tom Gola Arena (246); Philadelphia, PA
January 10, 2023*; 7:00 pm, ESPN+		at Penn	L 30–76	0–17	The Palestra (159); Philadelphia, PA
January 12, 2023*; 6:00 pm		at Princeton	L 37–84	0–18	Jadwin Gymnasium (385); Princeton, NJ
January 21, 2023*; 3:00 pm		at Merrimack	L 66–79	0–19	Merrimack Athletics Complex (197); North Andover, MA
January 24, 2023*; 7:00 pm		at Bryant	L 52–75	0–20	Chace Athletic Center (82); Smithfield, RI
January 28, 2023*; 1:00 pm		Chicago State	L 59–76	0–21	Chase Arena (228); West Hartford, CT
January 29, 2023*; 1:00 pm		Chicago State	L 49–57	0–22	Chase Arena (159); West Hartford, CT
February 5, 2023*; 2:00 pm		at Northern Vermont University-Johnson	W 63–53	1–22	Carter Gymnasium (120); Johnson, VT
February 8, 2023*; 7:00 pm		at Central Connecticut	L 55–72	1–23	William H. Detrick Gymnasium (146); New Britain, CT
February 12, 2023*; 1:00 pm		Villa Maria	W 84–31	2–23	Chase Arena (179); West Hartford, CT
February 16, 2023*; 5:00 pm		Merrimack	L 51–58	2–24	Chase Arena (170); West Hartford, CT
February 25, 2023*; 2:00 pm		at Chicago State	L 60–79	2–25	Jones Convocation Center (110); Chicago, IL
February 26, 2023*; 2:00 pm		at Chicago State	L 62–75	2–26	Jones Convocation Center (107); Chicago, IL
*Non-conference game. ^{#}Rankings from AP Poll. (#) Tournament seedings in parentheses. All times are in Eastern.
