= 2021–22 Columbia Lions women's basketball team =

American college basketball season

2021–22 Columbia Lions women's basketball

WNIT quarterfinals vs. Seton Hall, L 75–78
- Conference: Ivy League
- Record: 25–7 (12–2 Ivy)
- Head coach: Megan Griffith (6th season)
- Assistant coaches: Tyler Cordell; Greg Rosnick; Cy Lippold
- Home arena: Levien Gymnasium

2021–22 Ivy League women's basketball standings
	Conf.				Overall
Team	W		L	PCT	W		L	PCT
No. 25 Princeton †	14	–	0	1.000	25	–	5	.833
Columbia	12	–	2	.857	25	–	7	.781
Yale	9	–	5	.643	16	–	11	.593
Harvard	7	–	7	.500	13	–	14	.481
Penn	7	–	7	.500	12	–	14	.462
Cornell	4	–	10	.286	9	–	16	.360
Dartmouth	2	–	12	.143	3	–	23	.115
Brown	1	–	13	.071	6	–	20	.231
† 2022 Ivy League tournament winner Rankings from AP poll

The 2021–22 Columbia Lions women's basketball team represented Columbia University during the 2021–22 NCAA Division I women's basketball season. The Lions, led by sixth-year head coach Megan Griffith, played their home games at Levien Gymnasium in New York City, New York and were members of the Ivy League. They finished the season 25–7, 12–2 in Ivy League play, to finish in second place behind Princeton. They advanced to the Ivy League women's tournament finals but lost to Princeton 59–77. The Lions accepted a bid to play in the 2022 WNIT and made it to the quarterfinals, losing to Seton Hall 75–78. This was the first time an Ivy League team reached the WNIT quarterfinals.

== Previous season ==
The 2020–21 Ivy League season was cancelled due to the COVID-19 pandemic. In 2019–20, the Lions finished the season 17–10, 8–6 in Ivy League play, to finish in fourth place. They qualified for the 2020 Ivy League women's basketball tournament, but the tournament was cancelled due to COVID-19.

== Roster ==
2021–22 Columbia Lions women's basketball team
Players
Coaches

Pos.	#	Name	Height	Year	Previous school	Hometown
G	2	Madison Hardy	5 ft 9 in (1.75 m)	Jr	Our Lady of Good Counsel	Gaithersburg, MD
G	3	Eden Gainer	5 ft 9 in (1.75 m)	So	Wheeling Central Catholic	Wheeling, WV
G/F	4	Kaitlyn Davis	6 ft 0 in (1.83 m)	Jr	Greenwich Academy	Norwalk, CT
G	5	Jaida Patrick	5 ft 10 in (1.78 m)	Jr	Saddle River Day School	West Haverstraw, NY
G	10	Kitty Henderson	5 ft 10 in (1.78 m)	Fr	St Luke's Grammar School	North Curl Curl, Australia
F	11	Mary Lobon	6 ft 1 in (1.85 m)	So	Caxton College	Valencia, Spain
F	12	Hannah Pratt	6 ft 1 in (1.85 m)	Jr	Boca Raton	Boca Raton, FL
G	13	Mikayla Markham	5 ft 7 in (1.7 m)	Sr	St. Rose	Manasquan, NJ
G	15	Carly Rivera	5 ft 4 in (1.63 m)	Jr	St. John's College High School	Arlington, VA
G/F	20	Sienna Durr	6 ft 0 in (1.83 m)	Jr	Grinnell	Grinnell, IA
G	21	Nicole Stephens	5 ft 7 in (1.7 m)	So	Pickerington Central	Pickerington, OH
G/F	23	Lilian Kennedy	5 ft 11 in (1.8 m)	Jr	Mountain View	Buford, GA
F/C	33	Noa Comesaña	6 ft 1 in (1.85 m)	Fr	IES de Beade	Vigo, Spain
G/F	34	Paige Lauder	6 ft 1 in (1.85 m)	So	Villa Maria Academy	Malvern, PA
G	35	Abbey Hsu	5 ft 11 in (1.8 m)	So	Marjory Stoneman Douglas High School; St. Thomas Aquinas High School	Parkland, FL

Head coach

- Megan Griffith (Columbia)

Assistant coach(es)

- Tyler Cordell (Ohio Wesleyan)
- Greg Rosnick (Haverford)
- Cy Lippold (Dartmouth)

Legend

- (C) Team captain
- (S) Suspended
- (I) Ineligible
- (W) Walk-on
- Injured
- Current redshirt

Roster
Last update: March 9, 2023

== Awards and recognition ==
2021–22 Ivy Awards and recognition
- Kaitlyn Davis – First Team All-Ivy
- Abbey Hsu – Second Team All-Ivy
- Carly Rivera – Academic All-Ivy

== Schedule ==
Date time, TV	Rank^{#}	Opponent^{#}	Result	Record	Site (attendance) city, state
Exhibition
October 31, 2021*; 1:00 p.m.		NYU	W 89–55		Levien Gymnasium (222); New York, NY
Non-conference regular season
November 9, 2021*; 7:00 p.m.		Hampton	W 78–56	1–0	Levien Gymnasium (412); New York, NY
November 12, 2021*; 7:00 p.m.		at Davidson	W 87–78	2–0	John M. Belk Arena (547); Davidson, NC
November 14, 2021*; 12:00 p.m.		at Clemson	W 82–78	3–0	Littlejohn Coliseum (545); Clemson, SC
November 18, 2021*; 6:00 p.m.		at Lafayette	W 72–59	4–0	Kirby Sports Center (448); Easton, PA
November 21, 2021*; 2:00 p.m.		at Georgetown	W 66–56 ^{2OT}	5–0	McDonough Arena (303); Washington, D.C.
November 24, 2021*; 1:00 p.m.		Stony Brook	L 82–91	5–1	Levien Gymnasium (373); New York, NY
November 27, 2021*; 3:30 p.m.		vs. Mizzou; Christmas City Classic	L 80–87	5–2	Stabler Arena (576); Bethlehem, PA
November 28, 2021*; 2:30 p.m.		vs. Rider; Christmas City Classic	W 63–60	6–2	Stabler Arena (148); Bethlehem, PA
December 2, 2021*; 7:00 p.m.		Delaware	W 73–67	7–2	Levien Gymnasium (532); New York, NY
December 5, 2021*; 2:00 p.m.		at Marist	W 78–49	8–2	McCann Arena (1,157); Poughkeepsie, NY
December 11, 2021*; 2:00 p.m.		Massachusetts	L 75–87	8–3	Levien Gymnasium (676); New York, NY
December 13, 2021*; 5:00 p.m.		LIU	W 65–55	9–3	Levien Gymnasium (355); New York, NY
December 28, 2021*; 2:00 p.m.		Hofstra	Cancelled		Levien Gymnasium; New York, NY
Ivy League regular season
January 2, 2022; 1:00 p.m.		Yale	W 65–55	10–3 (1–0)	Levien Gymnasium; New York, NY
January 15, 2022; 2:00 p.m.		at Harvard	W 72–64	11–3 (2–0)	Lavietes Pavilion (130); Cambridge, MA
January 20, 2022; 5:00 p.m.		Cornell	W 57–46	12–3 (3–0)	Levien Gymnasium; New York, NY
January 22, 2022; 2:00 p.m.		at Brown	W 60–52	13–3 (4–0)	Pizzitola Sports Center (194); Providence, RI
January 26, 2022; 6:00 p.m.		Penn	W 61–56	14–3 (5–0)	Levien Gymnasium (105); New York, NY
January 29, 2022; 2:00 p.m.		at Dartmouth	W 65–46	15–3 (6–0)	Leede Arena (62); Hanover, NH
February 4, 2022; 6:00 p.m.		at Penn	W 66–57	16–3 (7–0)	The Palestra (192); Philadelphia, PA
February 5, 2022; 5:00 p.m.		at Princeton	L 39–57	16–4 (7–1)	Jadwin Gymnasium (906); Princeton, NJ
February 12, 2022; 2:00 p.m.		at Yale	W 65–57	17–4 (8–1)	John J. Lee Amphitheater; New Haven, CT
February 18, 2022; 7:00 p.m.		Yale; Play4Kay Game	W 74–70	18–4 (9–1)	Levien Gymnasium (1,023); New York, NY
February 17, 2022; 5:00 p.m.		Dartmouth; Pride Game	W 66–42	19–4 (10–1)	Levien Gymnasium (918); New York, NY
February 23, 2022; 5:00 p.m.		Princeton	L 53–73	19–5 (10–2)	Levien Gymnasium (1,913); New York, NY
February 26, 2022; 2:00 p.m.		Brown	W 85–56	20–5 (11–2)	Levien Gymnasium (717); New York, NY
March 4, 2022; 6:00 p.m.		Cornell	W 70–57	21–5 (12–2)	Newman Arena; Ithaca, NY
Ivy League tournament
March 11, 2022; 7:30 p.m., ESPN+	(2)	vs. (3) Yale; Semifinals	W 67–38	22–5	Lavietes Pavilion (771); Cambridge, MA
March 12, 2022; 5:00 p.m., ESPN+	(2)	vs. (1) No. 24 Princeton; Championship game	L 59–77	22–6	Lavietes Pavilion (925); Cambridge, MA
WNIT
March 16, 2022*; 7:00 p.m.		Holy Cross; First round	W 80–69	23–6	Levien Gymnasium (512); New York, NY
March 20, 2022*; 2:00 p.m.		at Old Dominion; Second round	W 62–59	24–6	Chartway Arena (493); Norfolk, VA
March 24, 2022*; 7:00 p.m.		Boston College; Third round	W 54–51	25–6	Levien Gymnasium (1,075); New York, NY
March 28, 2022*; 8:00 p.m.		Seton Hall; Quarterfinals	L 75–78	25–7	Levien Gymnasium (2,072); New York, NY
*Non-conference game. ^{#}Rankings from AP poll. (#) Tournament seedings in parentheses. All times are in Eastern.

== See also ==
- 2021–22 Columbia Lions men's basketball team
