= 2023 Ivy League women's basketball tournament =

- Classification: Division I
- Season: 2022–23
- Teams: 4
- Site: Jadwin Gymnasium; Princeton, NJ
- Champions: Princeton (4th title)
- Television: ESPNews, ESPN+

2022–23 Ivy League women's basketball standings
	Conf.				Overall
Team	W		L	PCT	W		L	PCT
Columbia	12	–	2	.857	26	–	5	.839
Princeton†	12	–	2	.857	24	–	6	.800
Harvard	9	–	5	.643	20	–	11	.645
Penn	9	–	5	.643	17	–	12	.586
Yale	7	–	7	.500	13	–	14	.481
Brown	4	–	10	.286	11	–	15	.423
Cornell	3	–	11	.214	10	–	17	.370
Dartmouth	0	–	14	.000	2	–	26	.071
† 2023 Ivy League tournament winner As of March 24, 2023

The 2023 Ivy League women's basketball tournament was the postseason women's basketball tournament for the Ivy League of the 2022–23 NCAA Division I women's basketball season. It took place on March 10 and 11, 2023, at the Jadwin Gymnasium on the campus of Princeton University in Princeton, New Jersey. Princeton won its fourth Ivy League championship, earning an automatic bid to the 2023 NCAA Division I women's basketball tournament, the team's tenth appearance.

== Seeds ==
The top four teams in the Ivy League regular-season standings qualify for the tournament and are seeded according to their records in conference play, resulting in a Shaughnessy playoff. If a tie for any of the top four positions exists, tiebreakers are applied in the following order:

- Head-to-head record between teams involved in the tie.
- Record against the top team(s) not involved in the tie in order of conference record, going down through the seedings until the tie is broken.
- Average of the teams' ranking in the following computer systems: NCAA NET, Sagarin, KenPom, and ESPN Basketball Percentage Index.

Seed	School	Record	Tiebreaker 1	Tiebreaker 2
1	Princeton	12–2	NET 41	
2	Columbia	12–2	NET 45	
3	Harvard	9–5	1–1 vs. Penn	1–1 vs. Princeton
4	Penn	9–5	1–1 vs. Harvard	0–2 vs. Princeton

== Schedule ==
Session	Game	Time	Matchup	Score	Television	Attendance
Semifinals – Friday, March 10
1	1	4:30 pm	No. 1 Princeton vs. No. 4 Penn	60–47	ESPN+	2,238
1	2	7:30 pm	No. 2 Columbia vs. No. 3 Harvard	65–72^{OT}	ESPN+	2,238
Championship – Saturday, March 11
2	3	5:00 pm	No. 1 Princeton vs. No. 3 Harvard	54–48	ESPNews	
Game times in Eastern Time. Rankings denote tournament seeding.

== Bracket ==
Semifinals; Friday, March 10; ESPN+
1	Princeton	60
4	Penn	47
2	Columbia	65
3	Harvard	72*

Championship; Saturday, March 11; ESPNews
1	Princeton	54
3	Harvard	48

== See also ==
- 2023 Ivy League men's basketball tournament
