= 2022 Ivy League women's basketball tournament =

- Classification: Division I
- Season: 2021–22
- Teams: 4
- Site: Lavietes Pavilion; Boston, MA
- Champions: Princeton (3rd title)
- Television: ESPNews, ESPN+

2021–22 Ivy League women's basketball standings
	Conf.				Overall
Team	W		L	PCT	W		L	PCT
No. 25 Princeton †	14	–	0	1.000	25	–	5	.833
Columbia	12	–	2	.857	25	–	7	.781
Yale	9	–	5	.643	16	–	11	.593
Harvard	7	–	7	.500	13	–	14	.481
Penn	7	–	7	.500	12	–	14	.462
Cornell	4	–	10	.286	9	–	16	.360
Dartmouth	2	–	12	.143	3	–	23	.115
Brown	1	–	13	.071	6	–	20	.231
† 2022 Ivy League tournament winner Rankings from AP poll

The 2022 Ivy League women's basketball tournament was the scheduled postseason women's basketball tournament for the Ivy League of the 2021–22 NCAA Division I women's basketball season. It was held March 11 and 12, 2022, at the Lavietes Pavilion on the campus of Harvard University in Boston. (Note: Although Harvard's overall administration and undergraduate campus are in Cambridge, Massachusetts, the athletic department offices and almost all athletic venues, including Lavietes Pavilion, lie within the city limits of Boston.) Princeton won its third Ivy League championship, earning an automatic bid to the 2022 NCAA Division I women's basketball tournament, the team's ninth appearance.

== Seeds ==
The top four teams in the Ivy League regular-season standings qualified for the tournament and were seeded according to their records in conference play, resulting in a Shaughnessy playoff. If a tie for any of the top four positions exists, tiebreakers are applied in the following order:

- Head-to-head record between teams involved in the tie.
- Record against the top team(s) not involved in the tie in order of conference record, going down through the seedings until the tie is broken.
- Average of the teams' ranking in the following computer systems: NCAA NET, Sagarin, KenPom, and ESPN Basketball Percentage Index.

Seed	School	Record	Tiebreaker 1	Tiebreaker 2	Tiebreaker 3	Tiebreaker 4
1	Princeton	14-0				
2	Columbia	12-2				
3	Yale	9–5				
4	Harvard	7–7	1-1 vs. Penn	0-2 vs. Princeton	0-2 vs. Columbia	1-1 vs. Yale
DNQ	Penn	7-7	1-1 vs. Harvard	0-2 vs. Princeton	0-2 vs. Columbia	0-2 vs. Yale

== Schedule ==
Session	Game	Time	Matchup	Score	Television	Attendance
Semifinals – Saturday, March 12
1	1	4:30 pm	No. 1 Princeton vs. No. 4 Harvard	72–67	ESPN+	
1	2	7:30 pm	No. 2 Columbia vs. No. 3 Yale	67–38	ESPN+	
Championship – Sunday, March 13
2	3	5:00 pm	No. 1 Princeton vs. No. 2 Columbia	77-59	ESPNEWS/ESPN+	
Game times in Eastern Time. Rankings denote tournament seeding.

== Bracket ==
Semifinals; Friday, March 11; ESPN+
1	Princeton	72
4	Harvard	67
2	Columbia	67
3	Yale	38

Championship; Saturday, March 12; ESPNEWS/ESPN+
1	Princeton	77
2	Columbia	59

== See also ==
- 2022 Ivy League men's basketball tournament
