= Leede Arena =

Arena in Hanover, New Hampshire

Edward Leede Arena
- The Tepee
- Interactive map of Edward Leede Arena
- Location: Dartmouth College; Hanover, NH 03755
- Coordinates: 43°42′11″N 72°17′0″W
- Owner: Dartmouth College
- Operator: Dartmouth College
- Capacity: 2,100

Construction
- Opened: May 22, 1987

Tenants
- Dartmouth Big Green (basketball & volleyball)

Edward Leede Arena is a 2,100-seat, multi-purpose arena in Hanover, New Hampshire. It has been home to the men's and women's Dartmouth College Big Green basketball team since its dedication on May 22, 1987. It is located within the John W. Berry Sports Center, which includes Leede Arena; two additional regulation basketball courts; a 4,500-square boxing gym and fencing room; four varsity locker rooms; squash and racquetball courts, and the athletic ticket office. The arena was named in honor of Edward Leede, class of 1949, one of the school's leading basketball scorers, and was built to replace the old Alumni Gym, next door to the sports center. It was built on the site of Davis Rink, the original ice hockey arena from 1929 to 1975.

Men and women's locker rooms equipped with meeting areas for opposing teams are adjacent to the arena. In addition, both the men and women's teams have spacious Team Rooms, which serve as places for game-day meetings and strategizing.

In 2007, a state-of-the art Bio-Channel Classic maple wood floor was installed on all three of Leede Arena's regulation courts. In the summer of 2010, Leede underwent a facelift when the bleachers were painted green, new banners were hung and a new sound system was installed. Leede also has the distinction of hosting the nation's longest-running women's basketball tournament, hosting the 34th edition (Blue Sky Classic) in 2010.

== See also ==
- List of NCAA Division I basketball arenas
