= Lavietes Pavilion =

Multi-purpose arena in Boston, Massachusetts

Ray Lavietes Basketball Pavilion at the Briggs Athletic Center
- Hall of Dreams
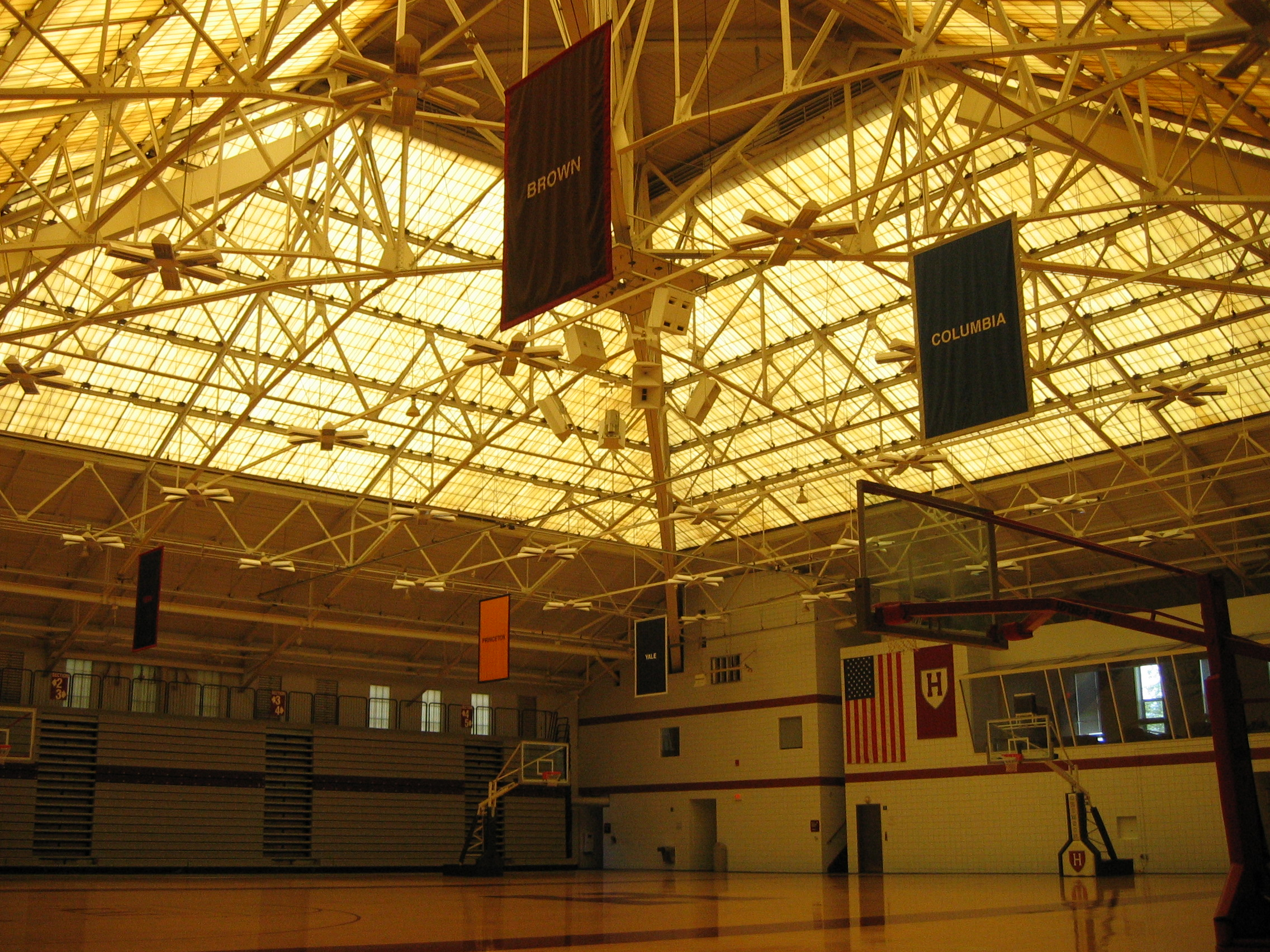
- Interactive map of Ray Lavietes Basketball Pavilion at the Briggs Athletic Center
- Former names: Briggs Athletic Center
- Location: Soldiers Field Rd; Allston, MA 02163
- Coordinates: 42.368218°N 71.125291°W
- Owner: Harvard University
- Operator: Harvard University
- Capacity: 1,636

Construction
- Opened: 1926 (original); 1982 (basketball)

Tenants
- Harvard Crimson (Basketball)

The Ray Lavietes Basketball Pavilion at the Briggs Athletic Center is a 1,636-seat multi-purpose arena in the Allston neighborhood of Boston. Owned by Harvard University, it is the second-oldest college basketball arena still in use (Fordham University's Rose Hill Gymnasium (1925) is older).The building was designed by Boston Architect Guy Lowell.

The facility was originally named the Briggs Athletic Center in honor of LeBaron Russell Briggs, who served as dean of Harvard College from 1891 to 1902 and as the school's athletic director for 17 years. Briggs also served as president of the NCAA. It included an indoor track and batting cages, which were popular with local collegiate and professional baseball players, including Ted Williams. In 1981, the Gordon Indoor Track and Tennis Facility (located adjacent to Harvard Stadium and the Bright Hockey Center) opened, and the building was refurbished as the new home to the Harvard basketball program, replacing the Malkin Athletic Center in Cambridge, Massachusetts. The women's first game in the building was on November 26, 1982, against Chicago, and the men's inaugural game took place a day later against neighbor and rival MIT. In March 1996, the building was rededicated to Ray Lavietes '36, a two-time basketball letterman who made a $2.1 million contribution to a second refurbishment project in 1995 and 1996.

In 2016 the university announced plans to renovate the facility with updated amenities. A new central scoreboard was installed as well as an expanded entrance lobby, ticketing area and locker rooms. Chairback seats were installed in the rear sections, which reduced seating capacity to 1,636, making Lavietes the smallest basketball arena in the Ivy League. The updated building opened in time for the 2017–18 men's and women's basketball season.

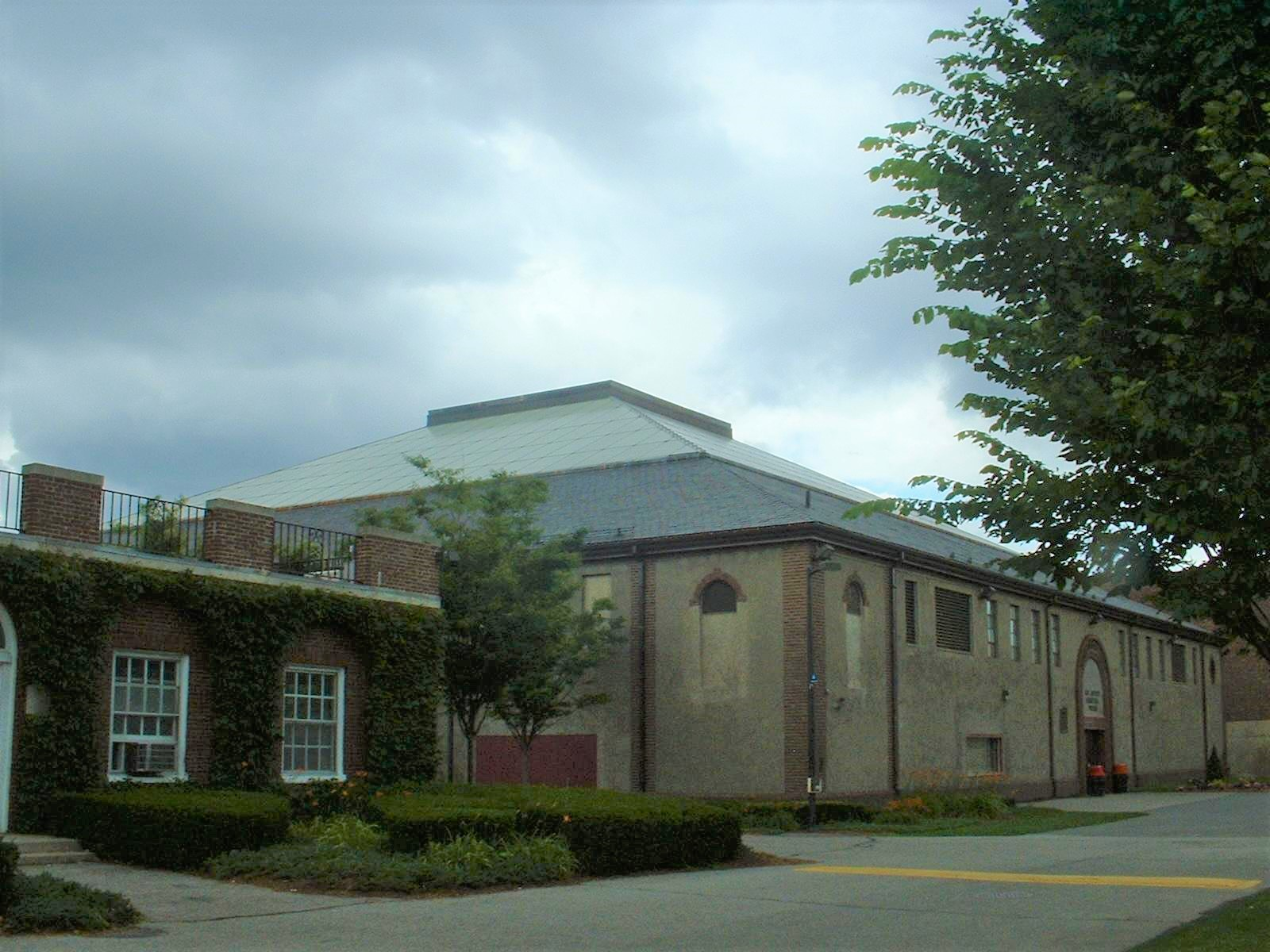
The Ray Lavietes Basketball Pavilion at the Briggs Athletic Center

== See also ==
- List of NCAA Division I basketball arenas
