= 2022–23 Villanova Wildcats women's basketball team =

American college basketball season

2022–23 Villanova Wildcats women's basketball

NCAA tournament, Sweet Sixteen
- Conference: Big East Conference

Ranking
- Coaches: No. 12
- AP: No. 10 (tie)
- Record: 30–7 (17–3 Big East)
- Head coach: Denise Dillon (3rd season)
- Assistant coaches: Joe Mullaney; Michelle Sword; Tiara Malcom
- Home arena: Finneran Pavilion

2022–23 Big East women's basketball standings
	Conf.				Overall
Team	W		L	PCT	W		L	PCT
No. 6 UConn†	18	–	2	.900	31	–	6	.838
No. 10т Villanova	17	–	3	.850	30	–	7	.811
Creighton	15	–	5	.750	22	–	9	.710
St. John's	13	–	7	.650	23	–	9	.719
Marquette	13	–	7	.650	21	–	11	.656
Seton Hall	10	–	10	.500	19	–	14	.576
DePaul	8	–	12	.400	16	–	17	.485
Georgetown	6	–	14	.300	14	–	17	.452
Butler	6	–	14	.300	11	–	19	.367
Providence	4	–	16	.200	13	–	19	.406
Xavier	0	–	20	.000	7	–	23	.233
† 2023 Big East tournament winner As of March 24, 2023; Rankings from AP poll

The 2022–23 Villanova Wildcats women's basketball team represented Villanova University in the 2022–23 NCAA Division I women's basketball season. The Wildcats, led by 3rd-year head coach Denise Dillon, played their home games at the Finneran Pavilion and were members of the Big East Conference.

== Previous season ==
The Wildcats finished the season at 24–9 and 15–4 in Big East play to finish in second place. They advanced to the championship game of the Big East women's tournament, where they lost to UConn. They received an at-large bid to the NCAA Women's Tournament as an 11th seed in Wichita region, where they defeated BYU in the first round before losing to Michigan in the second round.

== Offseason ==
=== Departures ===
Due to COVID-19 disruptions throughout NCAA sports in 2020–21, the NCAA announced that the 2020–21 season would not count against the athletic eligibility of any individual involved in an NCAA winter sport, including women's basketball. This meant that all seniors in 2020–21 had the option to return for 2021–22.

Name	Number	Pos.	Height	Year	Hometown	Reason for departure
Kenzie Gardler	4	G	5'4"	Junior	Broomall, PA	Graduated
Lior Garzon	12	F	6'1"	Sophomore	Ra'anana, Israel	Transferred to Oklahoma State
Brianna Herlihy	14	F	6'0"	GS senior	Braintree, MA	Graduated

=== Incoming transfers ===
Name	Number	Pos.	Height	Year	Hometown	Previous school
Maddie Burke	23	G	6'0"	Junior	Doylestown, PA	Penn State

==== Recruiting ====
There was no recruiting class of 2022.

== Roster ==
2022–23 Villanova Wildcats women's basketball team
Players
Coaches

Pos.	#	Name	Height	Year	Previous school	Hometown
G	1	Zanai Jones	5 ft 6 in (1.68 m)	So	Hudson Catholic	Jersey City, NJ
G	3	Lucy Olsen	5 ft 9 in (1.75 m)	So	Spring-Ford	Royersford, PA
G	4	Kaitlyn Orihel	5 ft 10 in (1.78 m)	So	Archbishop Wood	Newtown, PA
G	5	Anahi-Lee Cauley	6 ft 0 in (1.83 m)	So	Kent	Windsor, CT
F	10	Christina Dalce	6 ft 2 in (1.88 m)	So	Rutgers Prep	Edison, NJ
F	14	Megan Olbrys	6 ft 1 in (1.85 m)	Fr	Norwood	Norwood, MA
G	15	Brooke Mullin	5 ft 11 in (1.8 m)	Sr	Neshaminy	Langhorne, PA
F	20	Maddy Siegrist	6 ft 1 in (1.85 m)	Sr	Our Lady Of Lourdes	Poughkeepsie, NY
F/C	21	Kylie Swider	6 ft 4 in (1.93 m)	Jr	Tabor	Portsmouth, RI
G	22	Abigail Jegede	5 ft 10 in (1.78 m)	Fr	King's Christian Collegiate	Toronto, ON
G	23	Maddie Burke	6 ft 0 in (1.83 m)	Jr	Central Bucks West	Doylestown, PA
G	32	Bella Runyan	5 ft 11 in (1.8 m)	Jr	Moorestown Friends	Moorestown, NJ
F	43	Annie Welde	6 ft 0 in (1.83 m)	Fr	Cardinal O'Hara	Havertown, PA
G	44	Maggie Grant	6 ft 0 in (1.83 m)	Fr	Archbishop John Carroll	Downingtown, PA

Head coach

- Denise Dillon (Villanova)

Assistant coach(es)

- Joe Mullaney (Providence)
- Michelle Sword (Saint Joseph's)
- Mary Wooley (USC Aiken)

Legend

- (C) Team captain
- (S) Suspended
- (I) Ineligible
- (W) Walk-on
- Injured
- Current redshirt

Roster

== Schedule ==
Date time, TV	Rank^{#}	Opponent^{#}	Result	Record	High points	High rebounds	High assists	Site (attendance) city, state
Regular season
November 7, 2022*; 7:00 p.m., ESPN3		at Marist	W 60–38	1–0	21 – Siegrist	17 – Dalce	6 – Olsen	McCann Arena (2,126); Poughkeepsie, NY
November 11, 2022*; 7:00 p.m., ESPN+		at No. 25 Princeton	W 69–59	2–0	32 – Siegrist	13 – Siegrist	5 – Mullin	Jadwin Gymnasium (1,061); Princeton, NJ
November 17, 2022*; 7:00 p.m., ESPN+/NBCPHI+	No. 24	at Penn	W 67–41	3–0	22 – Siegrist	11 – Siegrist	5 – Olsen	Palestra (362); Philadelphia, PA
November 20, 2022*; 5:00 p.m., ESPN+	No. 24	at Temple	W 74–71	4–0	41 – Siegrist	16 – Siegrist	8 – Mullin	Liacouras Center (1,598); Philadelphia, PA
November 25, 2022*; 1:30 p.m., FloHoops	No. 23	vs. Belmont; Gulf Coast Showcase Quarterfinals	W 83–80	5–0	29 – Siegrist	4 – Dalce	5 – Mullin	Hertz Arena (345); Fort Myers, FL
November 26, 2022*; 5:00 p.m., FloHoops	No. 23	vs. No. 21 Baylor; Gulf Coast Showcase Semifinals	L 70–75	5–1	22 – Siegrist	12 – Dalce	2 – Tied	Hertz Arena (314); Fort Myers, FL
November 27, 2022*; 5:00 p.m., FloHoops	No. 23	vs. South Florida; Gulf Coast Showcase 3rd place game	W 72–50	6–1	25 – Siegrist	7 – Siegrist	5 – Olsen	Hertz Arena (247); Fort Myers, FL
December 2, 2022; 7:00 p.m., BEDN	No. 25	No. 13 Creighton	L 46–67	6–2 (0–1)	25 – Siegrist	9 – Dalce	3 – Cauley	Finneran Pavilion (2,841); Villanova, PA
December 4, 2022; 1:00 p.m., BEDN	No. 25	at Providence	W 79–54	7–2 (1–1)	29 – Siegrist	9 – Siegrist	6 – Olsen	Alumni Hall (289); Providence, RI
December 6, 2022*; 7:00 p.m., FloSports	No. 25	American	W 83–42	8–2	24 – Siegrist	7 – Siegrist	4 – Burke	Finneran Pavilion (767); Villanova, PA
December 10, 2022*; 2:00 p.m., FloSports	No. 25	Saint Joseph's; Holy War	W 82–59	9–2	31 – Siegrist	8 – Tied	4 – Tied	Finneran Pavilion (1,509); Villanova, PA
December 18, 2022*; 3:30 p.m., ESPN	No. 25	vs. No. 14 Iowa State; Basketball Hall of Fame Women's Showcase	L 62–74	9–3	32 – Siegrist	12 – Siegrist	3 – Mullin	Mohegan Sun Arena (7,654); Uncasville, CT
December 21, 2022*; 11:00 a.m., FloSports		La Salle	W 81–55	10–3	31 – Siegrist	11 – Siegrist	8 – Olsen	Finneran Pavilion (2,107); Villanova, PA
December 28, 2022; 8:00 p.m., BEDN		at Marquette	W 54–52	11–3 (2–1)	21 – Siegrist	11 – Siegrist	3 – Olsen	Al McGuire Center (1,921); Milwaukee, WI
January 1, 2023; 12:00 p.m., CBSSN		at Xavier	W 77–49	12–3 (3–1)	35 – Siegrist	10 – Dalce	8 – Olsen	Cintas Center (407); Cincinnati, OH
January 4, 2023; 7:00 p.m., BEDN		Georgetown	W 71–64	13–3 (4–1)	29 – Siegrist	10 – Siegrist	3 – Tied	Finneran Pavilion (609); Villanova, PA
January 8, 2023; 2:00 p.m., BEDN		Butler	W 68–58	14–3 (5–1)	36 – Siegrist	13 – Siegrist	5 – Mullin	Finneran Pavilion (2,101); Villanova, PA
January 11, 2023; 8:00 p.m., BEDN	No. 25	at DePaul	W 71–64	15–3 (6–1)	32 – Siegrist	12 – Siegrist	7 – Mullin	Wintrust Arena (1,075); Chicago, IL
January 14, 2023; 2:00 p.m., BEDN	No. 25	St. John's	W 64–61	16–3 (7–1)	32 – Siegrist	10 – Dalce	6 – Olsen	Finneran Pavilion (2,103); Villanova, PA
January 17, 2023; 7:00 p.m., BEDN	No. 22	Xavier	W 76–38	17–3 (8–1)	27 – Siegrist	10 – Siegrist	6 – Mullin	Finneran Pavilion (1,741); Villanova, PA
January 20, 2023; 9:00 p.m., FS1	No. 22	at Creighton	W 73–57	18–3 (9–1)	23 – Siegrist	8 – Tied	7 – Olsen	D. J. Sokol Arena (1,423); Omaha, NE
January 29, 2023; 2:00 p.m., CBSSN	No. 21	at No. 5 UConn	L 58–63	18–4 (9–2)	25 – Siegrist	8 – Siegrist	4 – Olsen	XL Center (14,375); Hartford, CT
February 1, 2023; 6:30 p.m., FS2	No. 19	Marquette	W 73–54	19–4 (10–2)	24 – Siegrist	14 – Dalce	6 – Olsen	Finneran Pavilion (1,841); Villanova, PA
February 4, 2023; 2:00 p.m., BEDN	No. 19	at Butler	W 78–58	20–4 (11–2)	31 – Siegrist	12 – Dalce	5 – Tied	Hinkle Fieldhouse (1,102); Indianapolis, IN
February 8, 2023; 7:00 p.m., BEDN	No. 15	at Georgetown	W 82–53	21–4 (12–2)	27 – Siegrist	12 – Siegrist	7 – Olsen	McDonough Gymnasium (767); Washington, D.C.
February 11, 2023; 1:00 p.m., BEDN	No. 15	Seton Hall	W 99–65	22–4 (13–2)	50 – Siegrist	10 – Siegrist	5 – Olsen	Finneran Pavilion (2,311); Villanova, PA
February 15, 2023; 7:00 p.m., BEDN	No. 14	at St. John's	W 73–57	23–4 (14–2)	39 – Siegrist	11 – Tied	7 – Olsen	Carnesecca Arena (1,026); Queens, NY
February 18, 2023; 2:30 p.m., FOX	No. 14	No. 6 UConn	L 51–60	23–5 (14–3)	21 – Siegrist	4 – Tied	6 – Mullin	Finneran Pavilion (6,501); Villanova, PA
February 21, 2023; 7:00 p.m., BEDN	No. 15	DePaul	W 67–64	24–5 (15–3)	28 – Siegrist	16 – Siegrist	4 – Tied	Finneran Pavilion (1,741); Villanova, PA
February 24, 2023; 7:00 p.m., BEDN	No. 15	Providence	W 67–50	25–5 (16–3)	23 – Siegrist	11 – Olsen	7 – Mullin	Finneran Pavilion (3,321); Villanova, PA
February 27, 2023; 7:00 p.m., FS1	No. 11	at Seton Hall	W 83–56	26–5 (17–3)	32 – Siegrist	11 – Dalce	5 – Olsen	Walsh Gymnasium (1,293); South Orange, NJ
Big East Women's Tournament
March 4, 2023; 7:00 p.m., FS2	(2) No. 11	vs. (7) DePaul; Quarterfinals	W 71–70	27–5	26 – Siegrist	14 – Siegrist	7 – Olsen	Mohegan Sun Arena; Uncasville, CT
March 5, 2023; 5:30 p.m., FS1	(2) No. 11	vs. (3) Creighton; Semifinals	W 63–61	28–5	37 – Siegrist	11 – Siegrist	5 – Olsen	Mohegan Sun Arena (7,712); Uncasville, CT
March 6, 2023; 7:00 p.m., FS1	(2) No. 10	vs. (1) No. 7 UConn; Championship	L 56–67	28–6	22 – Siegrist	11 – Dalce	5 – Olsen	Mohegan Sun Arena (7,808); Uncasville, CT
NCAA tournament
March 18, 2023*; 5:00 p.m., ESPNU	(4 G2) No. 10	(13 G2) Cleveland State; First Round	W 76–59	29–6	35 – Siegrist	16 – Dalce	6 – Mullin	Finneran Pavilion (4,257); Villanova, PA
March 20, 2023*; 7:00 p.m., ESPNU	(4 G2) No. 10	(12 G2) Florida Gulf Coast; Second Round	W 76–57	30–6	31 – Siegrist	10 – Olsen	5 – Mullin	Finneran Pavilion (4,361); Villanova, PA
March 24, 2023*; 2:30 p.m., ESPN	(4 G2) No. 10	vs. (9 G2) Miami (FL); Sweet Sixteen	L 65–70	30–7	31 – Siegrist	13 – Siegrist	3 – Tied	Bon Secours Wellness Arena; Greenville, SC
*Non-conference game. ^{#}Rankings from AP Poll. (#) Tournament seedings in parentheses. G2=Greenville 2. All times are in Eastern Time.

== Rankings ==
Ranking movements Legend: ██ Increase in ranking ██ Decrease in ranking RV = Received votes т = Tied with team above or below
	Week																				
Poll	Pre	1	2	3	4	5	6	7	8	9	10	11	12	13	14	15	16	17	18	19	Final
AP	RV	RV*	24	23т	25	25	25	RV	RV	RV	25	22	21	19	15	14	15	11	10	10т	Not released
Coaches	RV	RV*	RV^	RV	RV	RV	RV	RV	RV	RV	RV	RV	21	21	18	15	15	11	11	10	12

*The preseason and week 1 polls were the same.
^Coaches did not release a week 2 poll.

== See also ==
- 2022–23 Villanova Wildcats men's basketball team
