= 2022–23 Creighton Bluejays women's basketball team =

American college basketball season

2022–23 Creighton Bluejays women's basketball

NCAA tournament, First Round
- Conference: Big East
- Record: 22–9 (15–5 Big East)
- Head coach: Jim Flanery (21st season)
- Assistant coaches: Carli Berger; Jordann Reese; Chevelle Saunsoci
- Home arena: D. J. Sokol Arena

2022–23 Big East women's basketball standings
	Conf.				Overall
Team	W		L	PCT	W		L	PCT
No. 6 UConn†	18	–	2	.900	31	–	6	.838
No. 10т Villanova	17	–	3	.850	30	–	7	.811
Creighton	15	–	5	.750	22	–	9	.710
St. John's	13	–	7	.650	23	–	9	.719
Marquette	13	–	7	.650	21	–	11	.656
Seton Hall	10	–	10	.500	19	–	14	.576
DePaul	8	–	12	.400	16	–	17	.485
Georgetown	6	–	14	.300	14	–	17	.452
Butler	6	–	14	.300	11	–	19	.367
Providence	4	–	16	.200	13	–	19	.406
Xavier	0	–	20	.000	7	–	23	.233
† 2023 Big East tournament winner As of March 24, 2023; Rankings from AP poll

The 2022–23 Creighton Bluejays women's basketball team represented Creighton University in the 2022–23 NCAA Division I women's basketball season. The Bluejays, led by twenty-first year head coach Jim Flanery, played their home games at D. J. Sokol Arena and were members of the Big East Conference.

== Previous season ==
The Bluejays finished the season at 23–10 and 15–5 in Big East play to finish in third place. They lost in the quarterfinals of the Big East women's tournament to Seton Hall. They received an at-large bid to the NCAA Women's Tournament as a 10th seed in Greensboro region, where they defeated 7th seed Colorado in the first round, upset 2nd seed Iowa in the second round to advance to their first sweet sixteen appearance. They upset 3rd seed Iowa State to advance to their first elite eight. They lost to the National Champion South Carolina.

== Offseason ==
=== Departures ===
Name	Number	Pos.	Height	Year	Hometown	Reason for departure
Tatum Rembao	2	G	5'9"	Senior	Loveland, CO	Graduated
Chloe Dworak	24	G	5'6"	Senior	Lincoln, NE	Graduated
Payton Brotski	33	G	5'11"	Senior	Papillion, NE	Graduated

==== Recruiting ====
There was no recruiting class of 2022.

== Roster ==
2022–23 Creighton Bluejays women's basketball team
Players
Coaches

Pos.	#	Name	Height	Year	Previous school	Hometown
G	2	Kennedy Townsend	5 ft 10 in (1.78 m)	Fr	Park Hill	Kansas City, MO
G	4	Lexi Unruh	6 ft 1 in (1.85 m)	RS Fr	Sioux Falls Christian	Sioux Falls, SD
G	11	Kiani Lockett	5 ft 8 in (1.73 m)	Fr	Minnetonka	Minneapolis, MN
G	12	Jayme Horan	5 ft 10 in (1.78 m)	Jr	Millard South	Omaha, NE
G	13	Rachel Saunders	5 ft 9 in (1.75 m)	GS	Iowa City West	Iowa City, IA
F	14	Mallory Brake	6 ft 0 in (1.83 m)	Jr	Hastings	Hastings, MN
G	15	Lauren Jensen	5 ft 10 in (1.78 m)	Jr	Lakeville North; Iowa	Lakeville, MN
G	21	Molly Mogensen	5 ft 7 in (1.7 m)	Jr	Farmington	Farmington, MN
G/F	22	Carly Bachelor	6 ft 0 in (1.83 m)	Sr	Washburn Rural	Topeka, KS
G	23	Brittany Harshaw	6 ft 1 in (1.85 m)	Fr	Andover Central	Andover, KS
G/F	30	Morgan Maly	6 ft 1 in (1.85 m)	Jr	Crete	Crete, NE
F	31	Emma Ronsiak	6 ft 1 in (1.85 m)	Jr	O'Gorman	Sioux Falls, SD

Head coach

- Jim Flanery (Creighton)

Assistant coach(es)

- Carli Berger (Creighton)
- Jordann Reese (Drake)
- Chevelle Saunsoci (Creighton)

Legend

- (C) Team captain
- (S) Suspended
- (I) Ineligible
- (W) Walk-on
- Injured
- Current redshirt

Roster

== Schedule ==
Date time, TV	Rank^{#}	Opponent^{#}	Result	Record	High points	High rebounds	High assists	Site (attendance) city, state
Exhibition
October 26, 2022*; 6:00 p.m.	No. 21	Missouri Western	W 91–34		–	–	–	D. J. Sokol Arena; Omaha, NE
October 29, 2022*; 1:00 p.m.	No. 21	Truman State	W 97–34		–	–	–	D. J. Sokol Arena; Omaha, NE
Regular season
November 7, 2022*; 7:00 p.m., ESPN3	No. 21	at No. 23 South Dakota State	W 78–69	1–0	30 – Jensen	7 – Mogensen	5 – Jensen	Frost Arena (2,504); Brookings, SD
November 10, 2022*; 7:00 p.m., ESPN3	No. 21	at South Dakota	W 74–51	2–0	21 – Maly	10 – Maly	4 – Mogensen	Sanford Coyote Sports Center (2,372); Vermillion, SD
November 15, 2022*; 7:00 p.m., FloSports	No. 20	No. 22 Nebraska	W 77–51	3–0	22 – Mogensen	8 – Maly	7 – Jensen	D. J. Sokol Arena (2,306); Omaha, NE
November 20, 2022*; 2:00 p.m., ESPN3	No. 20	at Northern Iowa	W 85–66	4–0	23 – Ronsiek	8 – Mogensen	4 – Tied	McLeod Center (2,110); Cedar Falls, IA
November 22, 2022*; 7:05 p.m., YurView	No. 16	at Omaha	W 93–71	5–0	26 – Ronsiek	11 – Bachelor	4 – Tied	Baxter Arena (1,273); Omaha, NE
November 25, 2022; 11:00 a.m., FloSports	No. 16	at Xavier	W 57–51	6–0 (1–0)	18 – Jensen	8 – Mogensen	5 – Tied	Cintas Center (391); Cincinnati, OH
December 2, 2022; 6:00 p.m., FloSports	No. 13	at No. 25 Villanova	W 67–46	7–0 (2–0)	22 – Mogensen	8 – Jensen	6 – Bachelor	Finneran Pavilion (2,841); Villanova, PA
December 4, 2022; 1:00 p.m., FloSports	No. 13	at St. John's	L 62–66	7–1 (2–1)	21 – Jensen	6 – Tied	5 – Mogensen	Carnesecca Arena (394); Queens, NY
December 10, 2022*; 7:00 p.m., FloSports	No. 18	Drake	W 75–71	8–1	24 – Maly	7 – Mogensen	5 – Mogensen	D. J. Sokol Arena (1,083); Omaha, NE
December 17, 2022*; 1:00 p.m., FloSports	No. 17	No. 21 Arkansas	L 75–83	8–2	24 – Maly	11 – Bachelor	3 – Maly	D. J. Sokol Arena (1,050); Omaha, NE
December 20, 2022*; 9:00 p.m., P12N	No. 21	at No. 2 Stanford	L 59–72	8–3	18 – Jensen	6 – Maly	3 – Jensen	Maples Pavilion (2,988); Stanford, CA
December 28, 2022; 7:30 p.m., SNY	No. 21	No. 8 UConn	L 47–72	8–4 (2–2)	22 – Ronsiek	6 – Maly	2 – Tied	D. J. Sokol Arena (2,236); Omaha, NE
December 31, 2022; 3:00 p.m., FOX	No. 21	at DePaul	W 92–82	9–4 (3–2)	22 – Ronsiek	8 – Maly	6 – Jensen	Wintrust Arena (1,290); Chicago, IL
January 4, 2023; 6:00 p.m., FloSports	No. 25	Providence	L 75–79	9–5 (3–3)	30 – Maly	7 – Maly	7 – Mogensen	D. J. Sokol Arena (928); Omaha, NE
January 8, 2022; 3:00 p.m., CBSSN	No. 25	Marquette	W 68–42	10–5 (4–3)	19 – Jensen	7 – Maly	5 – Jensen	D. J. Sokol Arena (1,087); Omaha, NE
January 11, 2023; 8:00 p.m., FS1		Seton Hall	W 75–53	11–5 (5–3)	23 – Maly	7 – Jensen	7 – Jensen	D. J. Sokol Arena (1,236); Omaha, NE
January 14, 2023; 3:00 p.m., FS1		at Butler	W 75–56	12–5 (6–3)	20 – Ronsiek	7 – Jensen	5 – Saunders	Hinkle Fieldhouse (920); Indianapolis, IN
January 20, 2023; 8:00 p.m., FS1		No. 22 Villanova	L 57–73	12–6 (6–4)	11 – Tied	4 – Tied	4 – Mogensen	D. J. Sokol Arena (1,423); Omaha, NE
January 24, 2023; 6:00 p.m., FloSports		at Providence	W 64–46	13–6 (7–4)	20 – Ronsiek	10 – Bachelor	7 – Jensen	Alumni Hall (317); Providence, RI
January 28, 2023; 12:00 p.m., FloSports		at Georgetown	W 75–67	14–6 (8–4)	20 – Jensen	11 – Ronsiek	6 – Saunders	McDonough Gymnasium (785); Washington, D.C.
February 1, 2023; 6:00 p.m., FloSports		DePaul	W 83–74	15–6 (9–4)	21 – Maly	9 – Saunders	8 – Saunders	D. J. Sokol Arena (1,298); Omaha, NE
February 4, 2023; 1:00 p.m., FloSports		St. John's	W 81–65	16–6 (10–4)	22 – Maly	8 – Bachelor	8 – Jensen	D. J. Sokol Arena (1,315); Omaha, NE
February 7, 2023; 6:00 p.m., BEDN		at Seton Hall	W 77–64	17–6 (11–4)	21 – Ronsiek	9 – Maly	7 – Mogensen	Walsh Gymnasium (868); South Orange, NJ
February 12, 2023; 12:00 p.m., FloSports		Xavier	W 73–53	18–6 (12–4)	15 – Jensen	9 – Ronsiek	5 – Jensen	D. J. Sokol Arena (1,389); Omaha, NE
February 15, 2023; 7:30 p.m., SNY		at No. 6 UConn	L 60–62	18–7 (12–5)	15 – Maly	8 – Maly	5 – Ronsiek	Harry A. Gampel Pavilion (10,167); Storrs, CT
February 18, 2023; 1:00 p.m., FloSports		Georgetown	W 75–34	19–7 (13–5)	16 – Maly	10 – Brake	7 – Ronsiek	D. J. Sokol Arena (1,887); Omaha, NE
February 22, 2023; 7:00 p.m., FloSports		at Marquette	W 55–44	20–7 (14–5)	15 – Maly	12 – Ronsiek	5 – Tied	Al McGuire Center (1,232); Milwaukee, WI
February 27, 2023; 6:00 p.m., FloSports		Butler	W 74–46	21–7 (15–5)	16 – Jensen	6 – Tied	5 – Mogensen	D. J. Sokol Arena (1,427); Omaha, NE
Big East Women's Tournament
March 4, 2023; 8:30 p.m., FS2	(3)	vs. (6) Seton Hall; Quarterfinals	W 75–74 ^{OT}	22–7	22 – Ronsiek	10 – Maly	6 – Ronsiek	Mohegan Sun Arena (5,017); Uncasville, CT
March 5, 2023; 4:30 p.m., FS1	(3)	vs. (2) No. 11 Villanova; Semifinals	L 61–63	22–8	22 – Jensen	7 – Saunders	5 – Ronsiek	Mohegan Sun Arena (7,712); Uncasville, CT
NCAA Women's Tournament
March 17, 2023*; 5:00 p.m., ESPNews	(6 G1)	vs. (11 G1) Mississippi State; First Round	L 66–81	22–9	22 – Jensen	6 – Bachelor	5 – Jensen	Edmund P. Joyce Center (3,950); South Bend, IN
*Non-conference game. ^{#}Rankings from AP Poll. (#) Tournament seedings in parentheses. G1=Greenville 1. All times are in Central.

== Rankings ==
Ranking movements Legend: ██ Increase in ranking ██ Decrease in ranking — = Not ranked RV = Received votes т = Tied with team above or below
	Week																				
Poll	Pre	1	2	3	4	5	6	7	8	9	10	11	12	13	14	15	16	17	18	19	Final
AP	21	21*	20	16	13	18	16т	21	21	25	RV	RV	—								Not released
Coaches	21	21*	20^	15	14	18	16	20	21	24	RV	RV	RV								

*The preseason and week 1 polls were the same.
^Coaches did not release a week 2 poll.

== See also ==
- 2022–23 Creighton Bluejays men's basketball team
