= 2022–23 UConn Huskies women's basketball team =

Intercollegiate basketball season

2022–23 UConn Huskies women's basketball

Big East tournament champions Big East regular season champions Phil Knight Legacy tournament champions

NCAA tournament, Sweet Sixteen
- Conference: Big East Conference

Ranking
- Coaches: No. 9
- AP: No. 6
- Record: 31–6 (18–2 Big East)
- Head coach: Geno Auriemma (38th season)
- Associate head coach: Chris Dailey (38th season)
- Assistant coaches: Jamelle Elliott (3rd season); Morgan Valley (2nd season)
- Home arena: Harry A. Gampel Pavilion; XL Center

2022–23 Big East women's basketball standings
	Conf.				Overall
Team	W		L	PCT	W		L	PCT
No. 6 UConn†	18	–	2	.900	31	–	6	.838
No. 10т Villanova	17	–	3	.850	30	–	7	.811
Creighton	15	–	5	.750	22	–	9	.710
St. John's	13	–	7	.650	23	–	9	.719
Marquette	13	–	7	.650	21	–	11	.656
Seton Hall	10	–	10	.500	19	–	14	.576
DePaul	8	–	12	.400	16	–	17	.485
Georgetown	6	–	14	.300	14	–	17	.452
Butler	6	–	14	.300	11	–	19	.367
Providence	4	–	16	.200	13	–	19	.406
Xavier	0	–	20	.000	7	–	23	.233
† 2023 Big East tournament winner As of March 24, 2023; Rankings from AP poll

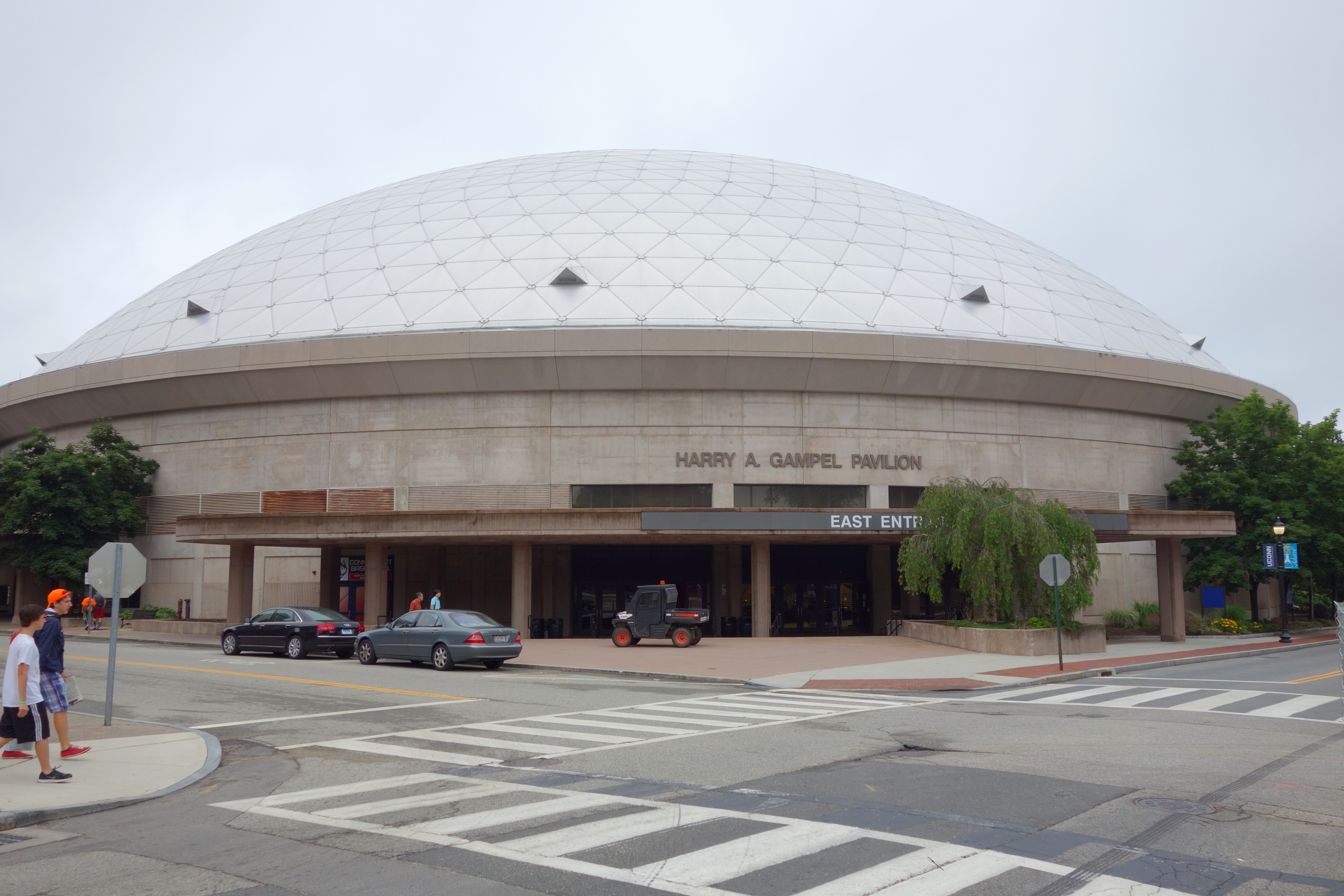
Harry A. Gampel Pavilion, where the Huskies played home games

The 2022–23 UConn Huskies women's basketball team represented the University of Connecticut (UConn) during the 2022–23 NCAA Division I women's basketball season. The Huskies, led by Hall of Fame head coach Geno Auriemma in his 38th season at UConn, split their home games between Harry A. Gampel Pavilion on their campus in Storrs and the XL Center in Hartford, Connecticut. UConn is a member of the Big East Conference, which it joined in the 2020–21 season; it had been a member of the original Big East Conference from 1979 through 2013, and one of the original women's basketball teams in that conference in 1982. (Note: The settlement of the 2013 split of the Big East Conference resulted in the so-called "Catholic 7" purchasing the "Big East" name and reorganizing as a new conference. The original conference charter was retained by the Division I FBS football schools that now operate as the American Athletic Conference. As part of the settlement, the current Big East recognizes the competitive history of the original conference in all sports that it sponsors.)

The Huskies finished an injury-plagued previous season with a record of 30–6, losing the championship game of the 2022 NCAA women's basketball tournament to South Carolina. Three graduates from that squad were selected in the 2022 WNBA draft, but with six returning starters including the backcourt of Paige Bueckers, Azzi Fudd, and Nika Mühl, with forwards Dorka Juhász, Aaliyah Edwards, and Caroline Ducharme, UConn was expected to win the much improved Big East again. Bueckers tore an ACL in a pickup game before fall workouts, and five-star recruit Ice Brady suffered a tendon dislocation during an early practice; both players underwent season ending surgeries and sat on the bench all season.

Starting the season already down two players, UConn played surprisingly well against early opponents, with strong wins against #3 Texas, #10 NC State, and #9 Iowa in the first weeks. In the Texas game, Juhász injured a thumb and was sidelined for several weeks. Aubrey Griffin, who had redshirted the previous season because of injury, and Lou Lopez Sénéchal, a graduate transfer shooting guard from Fairfield University, got some starts and immediately impacted the team with their durability and shooting proficiency. Fudd began the season as a leading scorer, with Mühl leading the country in assists per game, and Edwards seemingly unstoppable in the paint. Fudd was injured in the loss to #7 Notre Dame, and by the end of December the Huskies only had seven players healthy, even after Juhász's return. On January 8, UConn's contest against DePaul was postponed because the Huskies only had six players able to play.

Even with a short bench, the Huskies continued to win January, dominating most conference opponents and picking up another quality win at Tennessee, the only team to score more than 60 points against the fierce UConn team defense in January. In early February the team matched up against the #1 ranked South Carolina Gamecocks with a sold-out home crowd in the XL Center but lost 81–77. Three days later, Marquette upset the noticeably worn-out Huskies in a tight defensive battle, UConn's first consecutive loss in 30 years. While UConn was able to twice defeat rival Villanova, several Big East teams strongly tested the still-shorthanded and battered Huskies, St. John's outscoring them by five. UConn finished their regular season with an overall record of 26–5 and a conference record of 18–2. They won the Big East regular season championship and were the top seed in the conference tournament. Azzi Fudd and Caroline Ducharme, who both missed a significant part of the regular season due to injury, returned in time for the Big East tournament, and with the UConn squad healthy for the first time since its first games, the Huskies methodically notched three consecutive wins to emerge as tournament champions, getting the automatic bid to the 2023 NCAA women's basketball tournament. In the NCAA tournament, UConn advanced to their 29th consecutive Sweet Sixteen with wins over Vermont and Baylor. However, they lost to Ohio St. in the next round, ending their Final Four streak at 14. The Huskies finished their season with a 31–6 record.

With most of their roster either injured or in-development during the season, the Huskies relied heavily on several players for the first time. Mühl, the team's new point guard, set a UConn single-season record with 284 assists. Edwards was the team's leading scorer and a third team All-American. Lopez Sénéchal and Juhász, who had both transferred from other schools in the previous two years, put up solid numbers, as did Griffin, who had missed the previous season.

== Previous season ==
UConn was ranked no. 2 in both the 2021 AP and Coaches pre-season polls. After some early struggles, they finished the regular season with a record of 22–5, including 16–1 in the Big East to win the conference regular season championship. UConn then won the Big East tournament. As a no. 2 seed in the NCAA tournament, they advanced to the championship game, where they lost to South Carolina. UConn finished their campaign with a record of 30–6.

== Offseason ==
=== Departures ===
The Huskies graduated senior starters Christyn Williams, Olivia Nelson-Ododa, and Evina Westbrook from the 2021–22 roster, each of them being drafted into the Women's National Basketball Association. Sophomore Piath Gabriel chose to enter the transfer portal during the offseason and accepted a scholarship at UMass.

Name	Number	Pos.	Height	Year	Hometown	Reason for departure
Christyn Williams	13	G	5'11"	Senior	Little Rock, AR	Graduated; drafted by the WNBA's Washington Mystics
Olivia Nelson-Ododa	20	F	6'5"	Senior	Winder, GA	Graduated; drafted by the WNBA's Los Angeles Sparks
Evina Westbrook	22	G	6'0"	Senior	Salem, OR	Graduated; drafted by the WNBA's Seattle Storm
Piath Gabriel	32	F	6'5"	Sophomore	Manchester, NH	Entered NCAA transfer portal

=== Incoming transfers ===
Tour of Huskies' team facilities
- UCONN Women's Basketball Virtual Tour

The Huskies added Lou Lopez Sénéchal, a graduate student from Grenoble, France, who transferred from Fairfield University. While at Fairfield, Lopez Sénéchal was the 2021–22 MAAC Player of the Year and was three-time All-MAAC First Team. She had one year of eligibility remaining.

Name	Number	Pos.	Height	Year	Hometown	Previous school
Lou Lopez Sénéchal	11	G/F	6'1"	Graduate student	Grenoble, France	Fairfield

=== Injuries ===
UConn lost two players to knee injuries during the 2022 offseason. On August 1, superstar guard Paige Bueckers tore her left ACL during a pick-up game, and UConn announced two days later that she would miss the entire 2022–23 season. Then, during a Huskies practice on October 21, freshman forward Ice Brady dislocated her right patellar tendon; she underwent season-ending surgery on October 25.

=== Recruiting ===
The Huskies had another excellent recruiting class. ESPN ranked Patterson as the fourth-best recruit of the 2022 class and Brady as the fifth-best. Brady would be lost for the 2022–23 season to a knee injury. Bettencourt was recruited just before the start of the season.

College recruiting
Name	Hometown	School	Height	Weight	Commit date
Ayanna Patterson; F	Fort Wayne, IN	Homestead High School	6 ft 2 in (1.88 m)	N/A	
Ayanna Patterson; F	Recruit ratings: ESPN: (98)				
Isuneh "Ice" Brady; F	San Diego, CA	Cathedral Catholic High School	6 ft 3 in (1.91 m)	N/A	
Isuneh "Ice" Brady; F	Recruit ratings: ESPN: (98)				
Inês Bettencourt; G	São Miguel, Portugal	Clube União Sportiva	5 ft 9 in (1.75 m)	N/A	
Inês Bettencourt; G	Recruit ratings: No ratings found				
Overall recruit ranking: ESPN: 2
Note: In many cases, Scout, Rivals, 247Sports, On3, and ESPN may conflict in their listings of height and weight.; In these cases, the average was taken. ESPN grades are on a 100-point scale.; Sources: "2022 Player Commits". ESPN. Archived from the original on September 27, 2021.

==== Recruiting class of 2023 ====
The Huskies continued to recruit well. ESPN evaluated UConn's class of 2023 as the fourth-ranked group, behind LSU, South Carolina, and Arizona.

College recruiting (2023)
Name	Hometown	School	Height	Weight	Commit date
Kamorea "KK" Arnold; PG	Germantown, WI	Germantown High School	5 ft 9 in (1.75 m)	N/A	
Kamorea "KK" Arnold; PG	Recruit ratings: ESPN: (97)				
Ashlynn Shade; G	Noblesville, IN	La Lumiere School	5 ft 10 in (1.78 m)	N/A	
Ashlynn Shade; G	Recruit ratings: ESPN: (96)				
Qadence Samuels; W	Forestville, MD	Bishop McNamara High School	6 ft 2 in (1.88 m)	N/A	
Qadence Samuels; W	Recruit ratings: ESPN: (94)				
Jana El-Alfy; F	Cairo, Egypt	Al Ahly Sporting Club	6 ft 4 in (1.93 m)	N/A	
Jana El-Alfy; F	Recruit ratings: No ratings found				
Overall recruit ranking: ESPN: 4
Note: In many cases, Scout, Rivals, 247Sports, On3, and ESPN may conflict in their listings of height and weight.; In these cases, the average was taken. ESPN grades are on a 100-point scale.; Sources: "2023 Player Commits". ESPN. Archived from the original on November 13, 2022.

==== Recruiting class of 2024 ====
On December 3, 2022, UConn received a verbal commitment from five-star guard Allie Ziebell of Neenah, Wisconsin.

College recruiting (2024)
Name	Hometown	School	Height	Weight	Commit date
Allie Ziebell; G	Neenah, WI	Neenah High School	5 ft 10 in (1.78 m)	N/A	
Allie Ziebell; G	Recruit ratings: ESPN: (98)				
Morgan Cheli; G	San Jose, CA	Archbishop Mitty High School	6 ft 2 in (1.88 m)	N/A	
Morgan Cheli; G	Recruit ratings: ESPN: (96)				
Overall recruit ranking:
Note: In many cases, Scout, Rivals, 247Sports, On3, and ESPN may conflict in their listings of height and weight.; In these cases, the average was taken. ESPN grades are on a 100-point scale.; Sources: "2024 Player Commits". ESPN. Archived from the original on December 3, 2022.

=== Coaching ===
Hall of Fame head coach Geno Auriemma and Hall of Fame associate head coach Chris Dailey returned for their 38th season. Assistant coach Jamelle Elliott was a UConn assistant coach from 1998 to 2009 and returned after a nine-year head coaching stint at Cincinnati. Assistant coach Morgan Valley was the head coach of the Hartford Hawks when hired by the Huskies. Elliott and Valley are both former UConn players.

== Roster ==
2022–23 UConn Huskies women's basketball team
Players
Coaches

Pos.	#	Name	Height	Year	Previous school	Hometown
F	3	Aaliyah Edwards	6 ft 3 in (1.91 m)	Jr	Crestwood Preparatory	Kingston, Ontario
G	5	Paige Bueckers (injured) (redshirt)	5 ft 11 in (1.8 m)	Jr	Hopkins	Hopkins, MN
G	10	Nika Mühl	5 ft 10 in (1.78 m)	Jr	III. Gimnazija Zagreb	Zagreb, Croatia
G/F	11	Lou Lopez Sénéchal	6 ft 1 in (1.85 m)	GS	Fairfield	Grenoble, France
F	14	Dorka Juhász	6 ft 5 in (1.96 m)	GS	Ohio State	Pécs, Hungary
G	21	Inês Bettencourt	5 ft 9 in (1.75 m)	Fr	Clube União Sportiva	São Miguel, Portugal
F	25	Ice Brady (injured) (redshirt)	6 ft 3 in (1.91 m)	Fr	Cathedral Catholic	San Diego, CA
G	33	Caroline Ducharme	6 ft 2 in (1.88 m)	So	Noble & Greenough	Milton, MA
F	34	Ayanna Patterson	6 ft 2 in (1.88 m)	Fr	Homestead	Fort Wayne, IN
G	35	Azzi Fudd	5 ft 11 in (1.8 m)	So	St. John's College HS	Arlington, VA
F	42	Amari DeBerry	6 ft 5 in (1.96 m)	So	Williamsville South	Williamsville, NY
F	44	Aubrey Griffin	6 ft 1 in (1.85 m)	RS Jr	Ossining	Ossining, NY

Head coach

- Geno Auriemma (West Chester)

Assistant coach(es)

- Chris Dailey (Rutgers)
- Jamelle Elliott (Connecticut)
- Morgan Valley (Connecticut)

Legend

- (C) Team captain
- (S) Suspended
- (I) Ineligible
- (W) Walk-on
- Injured
- Current redshirt

Roster
Last update: March 11, 2023

== Game summaries ==
=== Exhibition ===
==== Kutztown ====
2022–23 Pre-season video: The Standard
- UCONN Women's Basketball "The Standard"

The Huskies began the season by hosting the Kutztown Golden Bears in an exhibition contest, the first meeting between the two schools. It was not the first time the Golden Bears had visited Storrs, however. On their return from a 2017 exhibition game against UMass, the Kutztown women were invited to tour the UConn campus and attend practice. Katie Lou Samuelson later said the Huskies wanted to show Kutztown "...what it means to be at this university and what we've been working for." In the November 6, 2022 exhibition at the XL Center, the Golden Bears briefly led 7–6 at the start, but the Huskies quickly took over, taking a 30 point lead into halftime. The final tally was 115–42.

=== Regular season ===
==== Northeastern ====
UConn opened the regular season with a 98–39 win against the Huskies of Northeastern. Azzi Fudd led all scorers with 26 points, and Lou Lopez Sénéchal scored 17. Forwards Aaliyah Edwards and Dorka Juhász each recorded double doubles, Edwards with 12 rebounds and 14 points, and Juhász with 11 rebounds and 14 points. Aubrey Griffin, who had redshirted the previous season due to injury, came off the bench to hit six of seven field goal attempts including her only three-point attempt, scoring 13 points.

==== Texas ====
An early season home contest against a top ten opponent is always highly anticipated, but the second game against number three Texas was a rematch for Husky graduate transfer Lou Lopez Sénéchal. After a loss in NCAA tournament play against Texas ended her four-year career at Fairfield University, Lopez Sénéchal found herself with an extra year of eligibility (due to COVID) and through the transfer portal arrived in Storrs. She prepared herself to play Texas, saying "... losing the last game of your season and then playing them the second game of the season is something I'm looking forward to."

In a November 14 sell-out of Harry A. Gampel Pavilion, the fifth-ranked UConn Huskies met the third-ranked Texas Longhorns. The first half was a rugged defensive contest; UConn held onto a slim three-point lead at halftime. The Huskies gradually widened the margin in the second half, briefly opening up a 17-point advantage. The final score favored UConn 83–76. Sénéchal scored 12 points, while Azzi Fudd led all scorers with a career-high 32 points. After the game, Texas coach Vic Schaefer said, "It ain't no different than any other year around here. They are really good." Juhász left the game with a hand injury, later determined to be a broken thumb which kept her out for the next five games.

==== NC State ====
For the second time in a week, UConn faced a top ten squad: the 10th rated NC State Wolfpack. The two teams clashed in the previous season's NCAA tournament regional final, dubbed a "double overtime thriller" by Sports Illustrated. NC State's Jakia Brown-Turner drilled a three-pointer with 0.8 seconds remaining to tie the first overtime. Paige Bueckers hit her first two shots in the next period and the Huskies went on to win 91–87, sending UConn to its 22nd Final Four.

This year's game would not be nearly as dramatic, at least within the confines of the game itself. The teams lined up for the pregame national anthem, and after the anthem was completed, UConn's associate head coach Chris Dailey fainted and was taken off the court on a stretcher. Auriemma reported, "The players were pretty taken back by it, and I didn't know what to expect going out there." The players managed to pull it together and started the game with a 9–0 run. Although the Wolfpack closed within five points late in the second quarter, the Huskies extended their lead to as much as 24 points in the second half and ended up with a lopsided 91–69 win. Fudd again scored 32 points, but the stat of the day was recorded by Nika Mühl, whose 15 assists set an all-time school record.

==== Duke ====
UConn was a participant in the Phil Knight invitational tournament, a basketball event held to celebrate the co-founder of Nike. Earlier events in 2017 and 2019 included only men's teams, but the 2022 event was extended to women's teams as well. UConn was one of four teams in the Legacy bracket, along with Duke, their first round opponent, Iowa, and Oregon State.

The game was close early on with the score tied at 13 with just under three minutes left in the first quarter, but UConn went on a 10–1 run to finish the quarter and was never threatened again. Lopez Sénéchal was the leading scorer with 23 points, the first time this season she was the leading scorer for the team. Nika Mühl recorded double digit assists with 10, while Edwards had a double double with 11 rebounds and 17 points. The final score was 78—50.

==== Iowa ====
UConn faced ninth ranked Iowa in the tournament finale, their third top 10 opponent in the last four games. The Huskies had a modest lead in the first quarter, leading by seven, 18–11, with just over three minutes to go. The second and beginning of the third quarters would belong to the Hawkeyes, as they put together a 13–2 run in the second quarter and an 11–2 run in the third quarter to take an 11 point lead, causing Auriemma to call a timeout. The Huskies responded, led by Azzi Fudd who hit seven out of seven field goal attempts in the third quarter for 16 points. Iowa came back in the fourth quarter, turning a four point deficit into a five point advantage, but Lopez Sénéchal and Ducharme threes helped the Huskies recover and go on to win 86–79. Fudd was one of five Huskies with double-digit scoring, and Mühl led the team in assists with 13.

==== Providence ====
Less than four minutes into the game, the Huskies were ahead 10–0. With just under two minutes left in the first quarter, UConn was leading 27–6, inspiring the Journal Inquirer's Carl Adamec to comment, "It took the UConn women's basketball team only eight minutes of playing time Friday night to make all the suspense associated with its game with Providence about individual statistics." The final score of 98–53 was decidedly in favor of the Huskies, but Adamec was right about individual statistics. Mühl recorded double-digit assists in her fourth consecutive game, which set a single-season record for the Huskies. Edward recorded a double-double for the fourth consecutive game, a personal best. At the time, Mühl's assists per game average was 11.0, which was the highest in Division I women's basketball.

==== Notre Dame ====
Notre Dame was just three days removed from their only loss of the season, a buzzer beater loss to Maryland on a last second shot by Diamond Miller. Now they faced Connecticut on their home court, but they had not beaten UConn at home since 2013. Notre Dame's Olivia Miles started out strongly, scoring the team's first seven points. The score was tied at 13, but then the Irish built and extended the lead. Fudd injured her right knee, left the game early in the second quarter, and did not return. Notre Dame expanded the lead to 17. The Huskies tried to respond and cut the lead to five, but the Irish built the lead back to double digits and coasted to a 74–60 win. Notre Dame hit 50% of the field-goal attempts and 46% of their three-point attempts and held the Huskies to under 37% field-goal shooting.

==== Princeton ====
Winning the game is typically the primary goal, but it is rarely the only goal. In addition to developmental goals — getting more time for some bench players, working on specific offenses or defenses in a real game as opposed to practice, there also are records, both at the individual and the team level that may be at stake in a particular game. This game featured more than the usual number of such records. The Huskies were the holders of a somewhat obscure, but impressively long streak — they had not lost back-to-back games since the start of the 1993–94 season, a streak now at 1,066 games, started long before any player on the current team had been born. It was the first time UConn had ever played Princeton, and the Huskies were on a 93 game winning streak when playing against first-time opponents. They also had a 76 consecutive games streak against an opponent with a former Auriemma player or assistant coach on the staff. Having just lost to Notre Dame, and former UConn player Carla Berube coaching the Tigers, all three of these streaks were on the line.

The game was within a point about halfway through the first quarter, but then the Huskies went on a small run, then extended the lead to 31–16, and it seemed the Husky fans could relax. However, Nika Mühl suffered a concussion early in the second half, knocking her out of the game. UConn's lead was still double digits when the fourth quarter started, but the Tigers started clawing their way back and cut the margin to a slim two points, 66–64, with 30 seconds left to go in the game. Inês Bettencourt was a freshman to-be headed to a Florida junior college when Paige Bueckers was injured during the summer, and UConn hastily looked for additional guard help. Bettencourt was persuaded to join the Huskies and now found herself on the court with the game on the line. She ended up hitting three of four free throws in the final 21.7 seconds, including two critical shots with 2.7 seconds left in the game that helped clinch the win. UConn won 69–64 and extended their three streaks.

==== Maryland ====
UConn traveled to Maryland with only seven players available to suit up for the game. It wasn't the first time UConn faced Maryland shorthanded — in November 2013, the Huskies only had seven scholarship players available for the game. But it's one thing to have seven players available when five of them will go on to be WNBA first-round draft picks, and it's another thing to be down to seven players because four starters are sitting on the bench. The shorthanded team started out encouragingly, leading 15–7 six minutes into the game. The lead was down to two points at the end of the quarter, and then Maryland outscored UConn by eleven points in the second quarter.

Maryland extended the lead to 10 in the third quarter, but UConn tied it up at 62 points apiece early in the fourth quarter. The game continued to be relatively close, but Maryland held the lead through the final buzzer, winning 85–78. Abby Myers, who transferred to Maryland from Princeton, was the leading scorer for Maryland with 20 points, hitting four of her eight three-point attempts.

==== Florida State ====
UConn returned Juhász and Mühl to the starting lineup, but minutes before the tip off, the school announced that head coach Auriemma would not be available due to illness. Associate head coach Chris Dailey stepped in for the 15th time in her career. The Basketball Hall of Fame Women's Showcase was played at Mohegan Sun Arena. The Huskies started strongly, scoring 10 consecutive points before Florida State made the first basket about four minutes into the game. UConn extended the lead to 15 points by the end of the first quarter and more slowly in the second quarter, but ended the half with a seemingly comfortable 51–35 lead. The second half was a different story, as Florida State cut into a 20 point lead and reduced the margin to four points with 3:19 left in the game. The Huskies responded and ended up with the win, 85–77. Edwards ended with 26 points, while Lopez Sénéchal has 23.

==== Seton Hall ====
Auriemma was again unavailable for the game against Seton Hall. His doctor recommended that he take a few days off to fully recover.

The team started out strong as they had against Florida State, ending the first quarter with a 25–10 lead. Unlike the game against Florida State, they did not let up and let the game get close in the second half. Although Seton Hall outscored the Huskies by six points in the fourth quarter, that simply cut a 30 point lead down to 25. Mühl had 16 points and 11 assists and got her first career double double. Juhász also recorded a double double with 10 points and rebounds. The final score in favor of the Huskies was 98–73.

==== Creighton ====
UConn traveled to Nebraska to play Creighton in front of a sellout crowd, with only seven players dressed. Amari DeBerry went home for the Christmas break to the Buffalo area and was unable to get a flight to Omaha. Aubrey Griffin tested positive for COVID and was unable to play. The remaining seven held the Blue Jays to their worst offensive performance of the year. Although the Blue Jays recorded more three-pointers than the Huskies, they only hit 10.7% of their attempts. The two point shooting was not much better, with an overall field-goal percentage of under 24%. The storyline was the play of Edwards and Juhász, who each recorded a double double. Edwards had 23 points and 20 rebounds, the first 20 rebound effort for UConn in over a decade. The team combined for 59 rebounds against 27 for Creighton. The final score in favor of UConn was 72–47.

==== Marquette ====
Eight players dressed for Marquette once DeBerry rejoined the team, but fans held their collective breaths when Juhász has knocked to the ground and had to be helped to the sideline. She received an ovation when she got back into the game and even louder when she nailed a three pointer. The game was a relatively low-scoring game, but UConn prevailed 61–48 behind 22 points for Lopez Sénéchal and 19 for Ducharme.

==== Butler ====
In January 2023, the team traveled to Indianapolis for games against Butler and Xavier. Auriemma traveled with the team and attended the morning shootaround but was not feeling well and decided to sit out the evening game, so Dailey took over again as head coach. Ducharme was missing from the lineup due to concussion protocol. UConn scored the first eight points, leading Butler to call a timeout. After Butler scored, UConn went on a 10–0 run. Edwards was dominant for the Huskies, outscoring the Bulldogs herself in the opening quarter. Butler did better in the second quarter, hitting multiple threes and cutting the lead to five points before UConn closed the half leading by 14. UConn was dominant in the third period and coasted to the 33 point victory, 80–47. Daily was now 16–0 as acting head coach.

==== Xavier ====
Dailey filled in for Auriemma once more, as the head coach was unavailable due to illness. Only eight players dressed for the game, and when Edwards crashed into chairs on the sidelines tracking down an errant ball, the team had only seven players for the rest of the game. "We had enough people to finish the game, so that's a good sign," said Dailey. "We've tried holy water. We've tried sage burning. None of them seem to work. It's just something we have to deal with. Whoever we have, we feel like we have enough." UConn started off the game slowly, hitting only one of the first nine shots but then started scoring, opening up a 31 point by halftime. Griffin had 17 points in the first half, while Juhász went eight for 12 in the game, scoring 18 points. Dailey was now 17–0 when filling in for Auriemma.

==== St. John's ====
So many UConn players were injured or otherwise unavailable by January 7, 2023 that the next day's home game against DePaul was postponed, due to insufficient players to meet the NCAA minimum of seven. UConn's next game was at St. John's on January 11.

Fans anxious for Fudd's return were encouraged when photos of her in the afternoon shootaround emerged with her wearing braids, a hairstyle she reserves for game days. "I always have my hair in two braids for games," Fudd said with a smile. "The past couple games it's been in a bun." The observation proved accurate, as Fudd came off the bench and played 20 minutes, scoring 14 points including two of four three-pointers. Edwards had a good game, hitting more than half her field-goal attempts, and on a night when the team free throw shooting wasn't overly impressive, she hit five of six. Her minutes were a bit limited due to foul problems, but she still managed to play good defense and record 15 points. Juhász hit 8 of her 14 field-goal attempts and recorded a double-double with 18 points and 10 rebounds and added seven assists. Lopez Sénéchal recorded about as efficient a 20 point output as you can manage. She took nine shots, hitting eight of them, hitting all four two-point shots and all but one of her three-point shots. Griffin helped the team hold St. John's leading scorer to well below her scoring average. The team had 62.3% of the field goal attempts, a season-high, which led to a 30 point margin of victory, 82–52, over the Red Storm.

==== Georgetown ====
UConn followed up its 30 point win against St. John's with a game against Georgetown, a team St. John's beat by 20 points, 68–48, on December 31, 2022. Georgetown came into the game with only a single win in the Big East, having beaten last-place and winless in conference Xavier. On paper it seemed like it should be an easy win. The game didn't start that way. Georgetown led at the end of the first quarter and was down by only a single point at the half. Auriemma explained, "We didn't have the energy to get us through some of the missed shots... It settled into an ugly scrum kind of a game. We couldn't get any kind of flow."

The Huskies did better in the third quarter, starting with a 16–2 run and following up with 12 unanswered points to pull out to a 65–41 lead. UConn ended up with a 15 point margin of victory, 65–50. Edwards had a double double with 17 points and 11 rebounds. Fudd banged her previously injured knee in the first half, left the game, and didn't return, sitting on the bench with an ice pack on her knee.

==== Butler ====
UConn scored twice before the game was a minute old, but then went over five minutes without a single point during which Butler ran off 13 consecutive points. The Bulldogs would score only six more points in the first half, while the Huskies would add 32 to take a 36–19 lead at the half. They then opened the second half with a run of 10 consecutive points and went on to easily win the game by 40 points, 79–39, despite having only seven players available.

The win represented the 10th consecutive win for UConn. Before Auriemma took over the coaching duties, the longest consecutive win streak by the Huskies was five games. UConn had now recorded a 10 or more game consecutive win streak in 17 consecutive seasons.

Three Huskies – Edwards, Griffin, and Lopez Sénéchal – were tied with 17 points apiece with two minutes left in the game. Edwards hit a layup and a foul shot to reach 20 points.

==== DePaul ====
UConn played DePaul on January 23, a game originally scheduled for January 8, but on that date, the Huskies were down to six available scholarship players, one fewer than the minimum required by Big East rules. The team had eight players available for this game. DePaul had All-American Aneesah Morrow on their team, who scored 20 points and pulled down 12 rebounds, but UConn's Edwards had 23 points, 10 rebounds, and four assists on 10 of 13 shooting to lead the Huskies to a 94–51 win over the Blue Demons. The Huskies had three other players with double-digit scoring: Griffin with 18, Sénéchal with 20, and Juhász with 19. Mühl had 10 assists, the eighth time she's had double-digit assists this year, setting a school record for a single season.

==== Tennessee ====
The Huskies were still shorthanded when they faced Tennessee, with only eight players available to play. One of the available players did not play, one played under two minutes, and one played 10 minutes. All five starters played 36 minutes or more, with Mühl playing all 40 minutes. The crowd of 13,804 was the largest Lady Vols crowd in the arena since 2015.

The Huskies opened strong, scoring 33 points in the first quarter and holding the Lady Vols to 17. Tennessee turned the tables in the second quarter, holding the Huskies to only seven points in scoring 19 to cut the lead to four points at halftime. Although Tennessee briefly cut the lead to two points early in the third quarter, UConn dominated the third quarter, outscoring Tennessee by nine and extending their lead to 13. The lead expanded to 19 points at the largest with the Huskies getting the win, 84–67.

Lopez Sénéchal scored a season-high 26 points, while Edwards was close behind with 25. Mühl contributed 14 assists, one off the school record set by her earlier in the season. Connecticut hit 55% of their overall field goals and 57% of their three-point attempts. Tennessee's Jorden Horsten had missed her previous game with an illness but came in off the bench and led all scorers with 27 points.

==== Villanova ====
UConn hosted the second place team in the Big East, Villanova, in front of 14,375 fans. After Villanova's leading scorer Maddy Siegrist hit an opening three pointer, the Huskies responded with nine consecutive points. As the first quarter drew to a close, Connecticut appeared to be in charge, leading 25–17. The second quarter was a different story, with the Wildcats defense holding the Huskies to eight points, and the margin was cut to three points at halftime. Husky fans traditionally stand at the beginning of the game and the beginning of the second half and rhythmically clap until the first UConn score. In this game, the crowd stood until Lopez Sénéchal hit a free throw with only 3:33 left in the quarter. By this time, Villanova had taken the lead. The Wildcats were still leading halfway through the final quarter, but UConn went on a 15–4 run to retake the lead. The Huskies were leading by five with 31 seconds left in the game, but a Wildcats steal leading to a three pointer cut the lead to two. Edwards made one of two free throws, and Villanova had two shots in a three pointer which would've tied the game with only four seconds to go. Those shots failed, and Edwards hit two final free throws to seal the win, 63–58.

==== Providence ====
The game played against Providence in December at Connecticut's campus location was very one-sided, with the Huskies winning by 45 points. The return engagement in Providence was very different. Although the Huskies led the entire game, after opening up a 15 point lead, the Friars cut the lead to six in the third quarter. UConn responded with a 13–2 run to extend their lead to 17, but the Friars cut it back to single digits with just over three minutes to go. Connecticut ended up with a 10 point win, 64–54, thanks to a double double by Juhász with 19 points and 17 rebounds.

==== South Carolina ====
The Huskies started strong, opening up a 25–14 lead at the end of the first quarter. The Gamecocks responded in the second quarter, and the game was tied at halftime. A technical foul late in the game gave two foul shots to South Carolina and possession, resulting in four points, extending the six-point lead to 10 points with under four minutes to go. With 1:20 to go, a technical foul was called on South Carolina during a basket attempt by Edwards. UConn hit one of two free throw attempts by Edwards, and one of two free throw shots associated with the technical by Lopez Sénéchal and then scored on the subsequent possession to cut the lead to six. The Huskies would go on to score nine more points in the final minute, but South Carolina scored six from the free-throw line to hang on to the win, 81–77.

==== Marquette ====
The game against Marquette was the second matchup between the two teams this season, with the Huskies beating Marquette at home by 13 points on New Year's Eve. The game at Marquette started out with UConn scoring three consecutive baskets, leading 6–0 three minutes into the game. Marquette responded, outscoring UConn 16–4 through the next seven minutes, and led by six points at the end of the first quarter. The Golden Eagles continued their dominance in the beginning of the second period, taking a 23–10 lead. UConn managed to tie up the game in the third quarter but never took another lead. A late 6–0 run by Marquette put the game out of reach.

This loss to Marquette following their loss to South Carolina meant UConn had lost back-to-back games, something that had not happened to the team since 1993. The AP described this as ending "one of the most remarkable achievements in college basketball history."

==== Georgetown ====
Following rare back to back losses, Connecticut faced Georgetown, a team the Huskies had beaten 33 consecutive times. The Hoyas threatened early, opening up a seven-point advantage and leading 17–13 at the end of the first quarter. They were down by only three points down partway through the third quarter. Georgetown cut the margin to four with half a minute left in the game but UConn hit their final four free throws to get the 67–59 win. Juhász and Griffin each had 18 points for the Huskies, while Georgetown's Fauntleroy had 24 points.

==== Creighton ====
In front of a sold-out crowd, the Huskies played the Blue Jays almost even in the first quarter, then gradually opened up a nine point lead with 3 1/2 minutes to go in the half. Creighton cut the lead back to two points at halftime, then took the lead and extended it to 11 points on the opening play of the fourth quarter. Ducharme, who had been scoreless in first three quarters of the game, scored 10 points in the fourth quarter, helping to give the Huskies the lead. UConn was up by two points when Creighton's Lauren Jensen, an 84% free throw shooter, went to the line with 0.7 seconds left in the game and a chance to tie the game. However, she missed the first so deliberately missed the second hoping for a rebound, but the rebound was secured by Edwards to end the game.

==== Villanova ====
UConn took on Villanova, ranked number 14 at the time, at their home court. Villanova was led by Maddy Siegrist, who averaged over 29 points a game, leading the Division I in scoring. A week earlier, she had scored 50 points in a game to set a school and conference record for a single game. The game was close through the first three quarters, with UConn holding a five-point lead at the beginning of the fourth quarter. The Huskies outscored the Wildcats 8–1 in the opening minutes of the quarter, pushing the margin to a 12 point lead, but the Wildcats scored 10 consecutive points over the next 4 1/2 minutes to cut the margin to two points. That was as close as Villanova would get, with Lopez Sénéchal scoring a "crucial rainbow jumper late in the fourth quarter" to lead the Huskies to a 60–51 win.

==== St. John's ====
UConn played St. John's at their home court in mid-January, beating them by 30 points. This game was at UConn's downtown arena — a win would give UConn a share of the Big East regular-season title. The game unfolded very differently than the game at St. John's. The game was very close at the midpoint of the first quarter, but then St. John's opened up a small lead, which became a nine point lead early in the second quarter. The Red Storm still had a five-point lead at the half. The Huskies came out in the second half with suffocating defense, holding the Red Storm scoreless for almost six minutes, taking a modest 43–35 lead. The Red Storm responded and held the Huskies scoreless for five minutes, a stretch covering the last two minutes of the third quarter and extending into the fourth quarter. St. John's opened up a modest lead of six points, which the Huskies cut to two points, but could not retake the lead, and the Red Storm ended up with the win, 69–64. This marked five consecutive games in which the Huskies did not score 70 points, which was the longest such streak since 1992. Coach Auriemma noted, "It would have been a sin if they lost that game. They played so well and so hard. They played like they were the better team, and they were."

==== DePaul ====
Connecticut travel to Chicago to play DePaul in the second of the conference home-and-home series. The earlier game had been rescheduled from January 8 because the Huskies did not have enough players to suit up. When the game was finally rescheduled, UConn beat DePaul by 43 points. This game would be different. The game was very close until late in the third quarter when DePaul opened up a seven point lead. The Blue Demons continued to hold a small lead until the Huskies tied it with just over three minutes to go. A DePaul turnover led to a UConn basket, and then Mühl hit a three pointer to give UConn a five-point lead. DePaul responded with two free throws and a layup to cut the lead to a single point with 17 seconds remaining. DePaul's best player, Aneesah Morrow, who had 25 points in the game, had the ball and raced down the court in an attempt to take the lead but was tied up, and the possession went to UConn. DePaul was forced to foul. The Huskies hit two free throws, and DePaul missed a three point jumper at the buzzer, giving UConn a 72–69 win.

==== Xavier ====
UConn closed the regular-season portion of the schedule with a game at home against Xavier, a team they had beaten at Xavier by 36 points. Xavier had lost all 19 games against Big East teams that season. The Huskies were up 20–11 early in the first quarter, but Xavier cut the lead to two points at the end of the quarter and took a lead briefly in the second quarter. The Huskies buckled down and extended the lead to 18 points, but the Musketeers did not wilt and cut the lead to single digits late in the game. UConn won the game 60–51, but the single-digit margin of victory represented a "school-record eight consecutive single-figure games." Mühl's seven assists in the game brought her season total to 236 which broke the school record set by Sue Bird in 2002.

=== Big East tournament ===
==== Georgetown ====
After a first round bye, UConn's matchup in the quarterfinals was Georgetown, a team who had played the Huskies within eight points a few weeks earlier. However, the Huskies had Azzi Fudd, who had missed the last 14 games. She did not start but entered the game midway through the first quarter to a roar from the crowd. While she did not hit her opening shots, teammate Edwards expressed how the team felt about her return, "But Azzi coming back, I think she adds a lot to the team both offensively and defensively and it showed tonight. And even though it took her a couple of shots to get into the rhythm, she did knock them down eventually, which we all knew that she would."

UConn started quickly with a 15–2 run in the first quarter. The Huskies held Georgetown to a single field goal in the second quarter and reached halftime with a 35–12 lead. They ended up winning by 30 points, 69–39, led by Edwards' 19 points and 13 rebounds.

==== Marquette ====
UConn faced Marquette in the semifinals of the Big East tournament. In the most recent meeting on February 8, Marquette defeated UConn 59–52, giving UConn back to back losses for the first time since 1993. Neither Ducharme nor Fudd were available for that game, while both were available for the semifinal. UConn opened with a 9–2 run and never relinquished the lead. The Golden Eagles did have and 8–0 run in the second quarter, but that only cut the margin to five points. The Huskies responded with a 12–2 run to take a 15 point halftime lead. Three UConn players – Edwards, Juhász, and Mühl – recorded double doubles as UConn advanced to the Big East tournament final with an 81–52 win.

==== Villanova ====
The Big East tournament championship game featured the top two ranked teams in the conference, UConn at number seven and Villanova at number 10. It is the only conference tournament this season to feature two top 10 ranked teams in the finals. The Huskies beat Villanova in their two regular-season games, but the margin in both games was single digits. Villanova had Maddy Siegrist, the nation's leading scorer. After the final regular-season game, a single-digit victory over Xavier which was the first team in 40 years to go without a win in Big East regular-season play, Auriemma drove home thinking about recent games. The next time he went to practice he challenged the team, "You guys have exactly three days to fix whatever it is that happened, either internally yourself or team-wise. Take a look at it or the season is going to end in the next two weeks."

The team responded. The game was close until the middle of the second quarter when UConn ran off nine consecutive points. A few minutes later they scored 12 consecutive points. At the end of the third quarter they had a 22 point margin. Edwards posted her third double double in as many days with 19 points and 15 rebounds. Her three-day performance earned her the most outstanding player of the tournament.

=== NCAA tournament ===
==== Vermont ====
UConn faced Vermont in the opening round of the NCAA tournament. Fudd scored 11 seconds into the game on an assist by Edwards, and UConn opened up a seven point lead before Vermont scored. Edwards ended up scoring 28 points, a career high, helping the Huskies to a 95–52 when over the Catamounts. The win gave the Huskies a 30 win season, the 26th time this had happened in the last 30 seasons. Every one of the 10 Husky players scored, the first time that happened all season.

==== Baylor ====
UConn took on Baylor in their bid for a Sweet Sixteen berth. The Bears had come back from an 18 point deficit to beat Alabama in the first round, connecting with a school record 14 three-pointers in that game. The three point shooting continued against UConn, as Baylor hit six three-pointers in the first quarter and took a 24–18 first quarter lead. The Huskies responded in the second quarter, taking a five-point lead into the half on a Mühl buzzer beating three taken from half-court. In the third quarter, Edwards picked up her fourth foul, but Griffin filled in and grabbed 12 rebounds. Fudd scored 16 points in the third quarter, one more than the entire Baylor team. The Huskies held the Bears to only eight points in the final quarter, ending up with a 77–58 win and their 29th consecutive appearance in the Sweet Sixteen. The second-longest active streak was held by South Carolina with nine consecutive appearances.

== Schedule ==
Date time, TV	Rank^{#}	Opponent^{#}	Result	Record	High points	High rebounds	High assists	Site (attendance) city, state
Exhibition
November 6, 2022*; 1:00 pm, WCCT	No. 6	Kutztown	W 115–42		29 – Fudd	10 – Patterson	11 – Mühl	XL Center (7,022); Hartford, CT
Regular season
November 10, 2022*; 7:00 pm, SNY	No. 6	Northeastern	W 98–39	1–0	26 – Fudd	12 – Edwards	7 – Mühl	Harry A. Gampel Pavilion (9,171); Storrs, CT
November 14, 2022*; 6:30 pm, FS1	No. 5	No. 3 Texas	W 83–76	2–0	32 – Fudd	9 – Juhász	9 – Mühl	Harry A. Gampel Pavilion (10,167); Storrs, CT
November 20, 2022*; 1:00 pm, FS1	No. 5	No. 10 NC State	W 91–69	3–0	32 – Fudd	12 – Edwards	15 – Mühl	XL Center (10,359); Hartford, CT
November 25, 2022*; 6:00 pm, ESPN2	No. 3	vs. Duke; Phil Knight Legacy Tournament semifinal	W 78–50	4–0	23 – Lopez Sénéchal	11 – Edwards	10 – Mühl	Chiles Center (2,299); Portland, OR
November 27, 2022*; 1:00 pm, ABC	No. 3	vs. No. 9 Iowa; Phil Knight Legacy Tournament final	W 86–79	5–0	24 – Fudd	13 – Edwards	13 – Mühl	Moda Center (7,168); Portland, OR
December 2, 2022; 7:00 pm, SNY	No. 3	Providence	W 98–53	6–0 (1–0)	18 – Tied	10 – Tied	12 – Mühl	Harry A. Gampel Pavilion (10,167); Storrs, CT
December 4, 2022*; 3:00 pm, ABC	No. 3	at No. 7 Notre Dame; Jimmy V Women's Classic / Rivalry	L 60–74	6–1	21 – Lopez Sénéchal	6 – Tied	6 – Mühl	Purcell Pavilion (9,149); Notre Dame, IN
December 8, 2022*; 7:00 pm, SNY	No. 6	Princeton	W 69–64	7–1	29 – Griffin	10 – Griffin	7 – Mühl	Harry A. Gampel Pavilion (8,731); Storrs, CT
December 11, 2022*; 3:00 pm, ABC	No. 6	at No. 20 Maryland	L 78–85	7–2	25 – Edwards	15 – Griffin	6 – Edwards	Xfinity Center (12,566); College Park, MD
December 18, 2022*; 1:00 pm, ESPN	No. 9	vs. Florida State; Basketball Hall of Fame Women's Showcase	W 85–77	8–2	26 – Edwards	9 – Juhász	12 – Mühl	Mohegan Sun Arena (7,654); Uncasville, CT
December 21, 2022; 12:00 pm, SNY	No. 9	Seton Hall	W 98–73	9–2 (2–0)	23 – Edwards	11 – Juhász	11 – Mühl	XL Center (9,125); Hartford, CT
December 28, 2022; 8:30 pm, SNY	No. 8	at No. 21 Creighton	W 72–47	10–2 (3–0)	23 – Edwards	20 – Edwards	8 – Mühl	D. J. Sokol Arena (2,236); Omaha, NE
December 31, 2022; 2:00 pm, SNY	No. 8	Marquette	W 61–48	11–2 (4–0)	22 – Lopez Sénéchal	10 – Juhász	6 – Mühl	Harry A. Gampel Pavilion (9,414); Storrs, CT
January 3, 2023; 7:00 pm, SNY	No. 5	at Butler	W 80–47	12–2 (5–0)	20 – Edwards	9 – Edwards	6 – Mühl	Hinkle Fieldhouse (2,414); Indianapolis, IN
January 5, 2023; 7:00 pm, SNY	No. 5	at Xavier	W 73–37	13–2 (6–0)	19 – Griffin	17 – Juhász	9 – Mühl	Cintas Center (1,812); Cincinnati, OH
January 11, 2023; 8:00 pm, SNY	No. 4	at St. John's	W 82–52	14–2 (7–0)	19 – Lopez Sénéchal	10 – Juhász	6 – Tied	UBS Arena (2,910); Elmont, NY
January 15, 2023; 4:00 pm, SNY	No. 4	Georgetown	W 65–50	15–2 (8–0)	17 – Edwards	11 – Edwards	6 – Mühl	XL Center (11,170); Hartford, CT
January 17, 2023; 7:00 pm, SNY	No. 5	at Seton Hall; Rescheduled from January 19	W 103–58	16–2 (9–0)	22 – Tied	11 – Tied	13 – Mühl	Walsh Gymnasium (1,296); South Orange, NJ
January 21, 2023; 12:00 pm, SNY	No. 5	Butler	W 79–39	17–2 (10–0)	20 – Edwards	7 – Tied	5 – Lopez Sénéchal	Harry A. Gampel Pavilion (10,167); Storrs, CT
January 23, 2023; 7:00 pm, SNY	No. 5	DePaul; Rescheduled from January 8	W 94–51	18–2 (11–0)	23 – Edwards	11 – Griffin	10 – Mühl	Harry A. Gampel Pavilion (8,055); Storrs, CT
January 26, 2023*; 8:00 pm, ESPN	No. 5	at Tennessee; Rivalry	W 84–67	19–2	26 – Lopez Sénéchal	7 – Edwards	14 – Mühl	Thompson-Boling Arena (13,804); Knoxville, TN
January 29, 2023; 2:00 pm, CBSSN	No. 5	No. 21 Villanova	W 63–58	20–2 (12–0)	19 – Griffin	7 – Juhász	3 – Mühl	XL Center (14,375); Hartford, CT
February 1, 2023; 7:00 pm, SNY	No. 5	at Providence	W 64–54	21–2 (13–0)	19 – Juhász	17 – Juhász	9 – Mühl	Alumni Hall (1,483); Providence, RI
February 5, 2023*; 12:00 pm, FOX	No. 5	No. 1 South Carolina	L 77–81	21–3	25 – Edwards	7 – Juhász	4 – Mühl	XL Center (15,564); Hartford, CT
February 8, 2023; 8:00 pm, SNY	No. 4	at Marquette	L 52–59	21–4 (13–1)	15 – Juhász	12 – Edwards	7 – Mühl	Al McGuire Center (2,565); Milwaukee, WI
February 11, 2023; 5:00 pm, SNY	No. 4	at Georgetown	W 67–59	22–4 (14–1)	18 – Tied	15 – Juhász	4 – Tied	McDonough Gymnasium (3,587); Washington, D.C.
February 15, 2023; 7:00 pm, SNY	No. 6	Creighton	W 62–60	23–4 (15–1)	17 – Lopez Sénéchal	9 – Edwards	7 – Juhász	Harry A. Gampel Pavilion (10,167); Storrs, CT
February 18, 2023; 2:30 pm, FOX	No. 6	at No. 14 Villanova	W 60–51	24–4 (16–1)	22 – Lopez Sénéchal	14 – Edwards	8 – Mühl	Finneran Pavilion (6,501); Villanova, PA
February 21, 2023; 7:00 pm, SNY	No. 4	St. John's	L 64–69	24–5 (16–2)	18 – Lopez Sénéchal	10 – Edwards	4 – Edwards	XL Center (9,324); Hartford, CT
February 25, 2023; 2:00 pm, FOX	No. 4	at DePaul	W 72–69	25–5 (17–2)	16 – Edwards	9 – Griffin	8 – Mühl	Wintrust Arena (4,278); Chicago, IL
February 27, 2023; 7:00 pm, CBSSN	No. 9	Xavier	W 60–51	26–5 (18–2)	19 – Edwards	8 – Edwards	7 – Mühl	Harry A. Gampel Pavilion (10,167); Storrs, CT
Big East tournament
March 4, 2023; 12:00 pm, FS1	(1) No. 9	vs. (9) Georgetown; Quarterfinals	W 69–39	27–5	19 – Edwards	13 – Edwards	5 – Mühl	Mohegan Sun Arena (7,407); Uncasville, CT
March 5, 2023; 3:00 pm, FS1	(1) No. 9	vs. (5) Marquette; Semifinals	W 81–52	28–5	20 – Edwards	12 – Edwards	10 – Mühl	Mohegan Sun Arena (7,712); Uncasville, CT
March 6, 2023; 7:00 pm, FS1	(1) No. 7	vs. (2) No. 10 Villanova; Championship	W 67–56	29–5	19 – Edwards	15 – Edwards	8 – Mühl	Mohegan Sun Arena (7,808); Uncasville, CT
NCAA tournament
March 18, 2023*; 3:00 pm, ABC	(2 S3) No. 6	(15 S3) Vermont; First Round	W 95–52	30–5	28 – Edwards	10 – Juhász	10 – Mühl	Harry A. Gampel Pavilion (8,043); Storrs, CT
March 20, 2023*; 9:00 pm, ESPN	(2 S3) No. 6	(7 S3) Baylor; Second Round	W 77–58	31–5	22 – Fudd	12 – Griffin	10 – Mühl	Harry A. Gampel Pavilion (10,167); Storrs, CT
March 25, 2023*; 4:00 pm, ABC	(2 S3) No. 6	vs. (3 S3) No. 12 Ohio State; Sweet Sixteen	L 61–73	31–6	25 – Lopez Sénéchal	10 – Juhász	5 – Mühl	Climate Pledge Arena (10,839); Seattle, WA
*Non-conference game. ^{#}Rankings from AP Poll. (#) Tournament seedings in parentheses. S3=Seattle 3. All times are in EST.

== Rankings ==
Regular season polls
Poll	Pre- Season	Week 2	Week 3	Week 4	Week 5	Week 6	Week 7	Week 8	Week 9	Week 10	Week 11	Week 12	Week 13	Week 14	Week 15	Week 16	Week 17	Week 18	Week 19	Final
AP	6	5	3	3	6	9	9	8	5	4	5	5	5	4	6	4	9	7	6	
Coaches	6т	3	3	3	6	9	9	8	5	4	5	4	4	4	6	5	9	9	8	9

Legend
	Increase in ranking
	Decrease in ranking
	Not ranked previous week
RV	Received votes
NR	Not ranked
( )	Number of first place votes

== Player statistics ==
Player	Games played	Minutes	Field goals	Three pointers	Free throws	Rebounds	Assists	Blocks	Steals	Points
Nika Mühl	36	1316	84	37	51	141	284	5	50	256
Aaliyah Edwards	37	1209	249	1	116	332	90	41	44	615
Lou Lopez Sénéchal	37	1161	211	77	76	115	61	11	18	575
Aubrey Griffin	35	1068	146	16	89	232	44	13	50	397
Dorka Juhász	29	975	164	24	59	287	92	41	43	411
Caroline Ducharme	23	511	64	25	17	94	28	6	10	170
Azzi Fudd	15	422	89	34	15	29	29	5	20	227
Ayanna Patterson	30	301	22	0	21	67	18	8	6	65
Inês Bettencourt	25	225	12	5	5	20	29	3	9	34
Amari DeBerry	26	212	24	5	5	43	20	18	6	58

== Awards and honors ==
- Aaliyah Edwards
  - Associated Press third-team All-American
  - United States Basketball Writers Association third-team All-American
  - Big East Most Improved Player
  - First-team All-Big East
  - Big East tournament Most Outstanding Player
- Nika Mühl
  - Big East Defensive Player of the Year
  - Second-team All-Big East
- Lou Lopez Sénéchal
  - First-team All-Big East
- Dorka Juhász
  - Second-team All-Big East

== See also ==
- 2022–23 UConn Huskies men's basketball team
