= 2023 Big East women's basketball tournament =

- Classification: Division I
- Season: 2022–23
- Teams: 11
- Site: Mohegan Sun Arena; Uncasville, Connecticut
- Champions: UConn (21st title)
- Winning coach: Geno Auriemma (21st title)
- MVP: Aaliyah Edwards (UConn)
- Attendance: 32,631
- Television: SNY, FS1, FS2

2022–23 Big East women's basketball standings
| | Conf. | | | | Overall |
| Team | W | | L | PCT | W | | L | PCT |
|---|---|---|---|---|---|---|---|---|
| No. 6 UConn† | 18 | – | 2 | .900 | 31 | – | 6 | .838 |
| No. 10т Villanova | 17 | – | 3 | .850 | 30 | – | 7 | .811 |
| Creighton | 15 | – | 5 | .750 | 22 | – | 9 | .710 |
| St. John's | 13 | – | 7 | .650 | 23 | – | 9 | .719 |
| Marquette | 13 | – | 7 | .650 | 21 | – | 11 | .656 |
| Seton Hall | 10 | – | 10 | .500 | 19 | – | 14 | .576 |
| DePaul | 8 | – | 12 | .400 | 16 | – | 17 | .485 |
| Georgetown | 6 | – | 14 | .300 | 14 | – | 17 | .452 |
| Butler | 6 | – | 14 | .300 | 11 | – | 19 | .367 |
| Providence | 4 | – | 16 | .200 | 13 | – | 19 | .406 |
| Xavier | 0 | – | 20 | .000 | 7 | – | 23 | .233 |
† 2023 Big East tournament winner As of March 24, 2023; Rankings from AP poll

The 2023 Big East women's basketball tournament was the postseason women's basketball tournament for the Big East Conference to be held March 3–6, 2023, at Mohegan Sun Arena in Uncasville, Connecticut. After four days of play, the #1 seed UConn Huskies defeated #2 seed Villanova Wildcats 67–56, thereby receiving the conference's automatic bid to the 2023 NCAA tournament.

== Seeds ==
All 11 Big East schools were scheduled to participate in the tournament. Teams were seeded by conference record with tie-breaking procedures to determine the seeds for teams with identical conference records. The top five teams received first-round byes. Seeding for the tournament was determined at the close of the regular conference season.

| Seed | School | Conference | Tiebreaker |
|---|---|---|---|
| 1 | UConn | 18–2 | |
| 2 | Villanova | 17–3 | |
| 3 | Creighton | 15–5 | |
| 4 | St. John's | 13–7 | 1–1 vs. Marquette; 1–1 vs. Creighton |
| 5 | Marquette | 13–7 | 1–1 vs. St. John's; 0–2 vs. Creighton |
| 6 | Seton Hall | 10–10 | |
| 7 | DePaul | 8–12 | |
| 8 | Butler | 6–14 | 2–0 vs. Georgetown |
| 9 | Georgetown | 6–14 | 0–2 vs. Butler |
| 10 | Providence | 4–16 | |
| 11 | Xavier | 0–20 | |

== Schedule ==
| Game | Time | Matchup | Score | Television | Attendance |
First round – Friday, March 3
| 1 | 11:00 am | No. 8 Butler vs. No. 9 Georgetown | 46–53 | SNY | 4,687 |
| 2 | 1:30 pm | No. 7 DePaul vs. No. 10 Providence | 67–54 | SNY | 4,687 |
| 3 | 4:00 pm | No. 6 Seton Hall vs. No. 11 Xavier | 84–58 | SNY | 4,687 |
Quarterfinals – Saturday, March 4
| 4 | 12:00 pm | No. 1 UConn vs. No. 9 Georgetown | 69–39 | FS1 | 7,407 |
| 5 | 2:30 pm | No. 4 St. John's vs. No. 5 Marquette | 47–57 | FS2 | 7,407 |
| 6 | 7:00 pm | No. 2 Villanova vs. No. 7 DePaul | 71–70 | FS2 | 5,017 |
| 7 | 9:30 pm | No. 3 Creighton vs. No. 6 Seton Hall | 75–74^{OT} | FS2 | 5,017 |
Semifinals – Sunday, March 5
| 8 | 3:00 pm | No. 1 UConn vs. No. 5 Marquette | 81–52 | FS1 | 7,712 |
| 9 | 5:30 pm | No. 2 Villanova vs. No. 3 Creighton | 63–61 | FS1 | 7,712 |
Championship – Monday, March 6
| 10 | 7:00pm | No. 1 UConn vs. No. 2 Villanova | 67–56 | FS1 | 7,808 |
Game times in Eastern Time. Rankings denote tournament seed.

== Bracket ==
First round Friday, March 3 SNY
8 | Butler | 46
9 | Georgetown | 53
7 | DePaul | 67
10 | Providence | 54
6 | Seton Hall | 84
11 | Xavier | 58

Quarterfinals; Saturday, March 4 FS1/FS2
1 | UConn | 69
9 | Georgetown | 39
4 | St. John's | 47
5 | Marquette | 57
2 | Villanova | 71
7 | DePaul | 70
3 | Creighton | 75*
6 | Seton Hall | 74

Semifinals; Sunday, March 5 FS1
1 | UConn | 81
5 | Marquette | 52
2 | Villanova | 63
3 | Creighton | 61

Championship; Monday, March 6 FS1
1 | UConn | 67
2 | Villanova | 56

Note: * denotes overtime
