= Megan Duffy =

American basketball player and coach (born 1984)

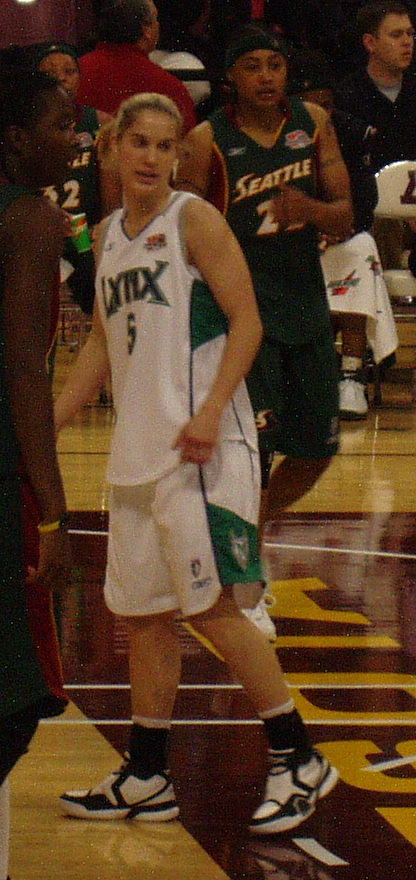
- Duffy playing for the Minnesota Lynx in 2006

Virginia Tech Hokies
- Title: Head coach
- League: ACC

Personal information
- Born: July 13, 1984 (age 42) Kettering, Ohio, U.S.
- Listed height: 5 ft 7 in (1.70 m)
- Listed weight: 135 lb (61 kg)

Career information
- High school: Chaminade Julienne (Dayton, Ohio)
- College: Notre Dame (2002–2006)
- WNBA draft: 2006: 3rd round, 31st overall pick
- Drafted by: Minnesota Lynx
- Playing career: 2006–2009
- Position: Point guard
- Number: 5, 13
- Coaching career: 2009–present

Career history

Playing
- 2006–2007: Minnesota Lynx
- 2006–2007: Rhondda Rebels
- 2007–2008: Pallacanestro Ribera
- 2008: New York Liberty
- 2008–2009: MBK Ružomberok
- 2009: CSS-LMK Sfântu Gheorghe

Coaching
- 2009–2012: St. John's (assistant)
- 2012–2014: George Washington (assoc. HC)
- 2014–2017: Michigan (assistant)
- 2017–2019: Miami (Ohio)
- 2019–2024: Marquette
- 2024–present: Virginia Tech

Career highlights
- As player: Frances Pomeroy Naismith Award (2006); 2× First-team All-Big East (2005, 2006); Big East Most Improved Player of the Year (2004); As coach: Big East Coach of the Year (2020)
- Stats at WNBA.com
- Stats at Basketball Reference
Medals
Representing USA
World University Games
Gold medal – first place	2005 Izmir	Team

Megan Duffy (born July 13, 1984) is an American women's basketball coach, currently the head coach at Virginia Tech. Previously, she had been the head coach with Marquette, before that the Miami RedHawks women's basketball team, an associate head coach with the Michigan Wolverines women's basketball team, George Washington Colonials women's basketball team, an assistant coach with St. John's Red Storm women's basketball team, and a professional basketball player in the WNBA, most recently playing for the New York Liberty.

== College playing career ==
Duffy was born in Kettering, Ohio. After graduating from Chaminade-Julienne High School, a Catholic high school in Dayton, she attended college at University of Notre Dame and graduated in 2006 with a double major in Psychology and Computer Applications. As an Irish athlete, Duffy was named to the CoSIDA Academic All American first team and was honorable mention Kodak All American. She received the Frances Pomeroy Naismith Award from the Women's Basketball Coaches Association as the best senior player under 5 ft 8 in (1.7 m). She is one of two players from Notre Dame, along with Niele Ivey, to win the award.

=== Notre Dame statistics ===
Legend
GP	Games played	GS	Games started	MPG	Minutes per game
FG%	Field goal percentage	3P%	3-point field goal percentage	FT%	Free throw percentage
RPG	Rebounds per game	APG	Assists per game	SPG	Steals per game
BPG	Blocks per game	PPG	Points per game	**Bold**	Career high

Year	Team	GP	Points	FG%	3P%	FT%	RPG	APG	SPG	BPG	PPG
2002–03	Notre Dame	32	96	24.2	20.0	76.3	1.9	2.3	0.8	0.0	3.0
2003–04	Notre Dame	32	318	40.3	**40.4**	81.9	2.9	3.9	1.4	0.0	9.9
2004–05	Notre Dame	**33**	407	**43.7**	40.0	**89.5**	3.1	**5.4**	**2.7**	0.1	12.3
2005–06	Notre Dame	30	**469**	39.9	34.7	88.8	**3.9**	4.1	2.0	0.1	**15.6**
Career	Notre Dame	127	1290	39.5	36.5	85.9	2.9	3.9	1.7	0.0	10.2

=== USA Basketball ===
Duffy was a member of the team representing the US at the 2005 World University Games Team in İzmir, Turkey. In the opening game against the Czech Republic, she led her team in scoring with 14 points. Duffy averaged 6.1 points per game. She helped the team to a 7–0 record and a gold medal at the event.

== Professional playing career ==
Following her collegiate career, she was selected 31st overall in the 2006 WNBA draft. Duffy spent her rookie season with the Lynx backing up Amber Jacobs; she averaged 3.4 points, 1.2 assists and 12.5 minutes per game in 2006.

Duffy went to training camp with the Lynx in 2007 but was released on April 26. She signed with the Los Angeles Sparks on April 30, but she was waived on May 18 in the final preseason roster cutdown.

A free agent most of the 2007 season, Duffy was re-signed by the Lynx on August 7, due to Kathrin Ress' departure to train with the Italian National Team. Duffy appeared in four games with Minnesota, averaging 1.4 points per game.

On March 11, 2008, the New York Liberty signed Duffy to a training camp contract.

During the 2006–07 WNBA off-season she played for the Rhondda Rebels in Wales, UK. In the 2007–08 WNBA off-season she played for Ribera in Italy. She played for MBK Ružomberok in Slovakia from September through December 2008 during the WNBA off-season. In January 2009, Duffy signed with CSS LMK Sfântu Gheorghe in Romania.

== WNBA career statistics ==
Legend
GP	Games played	GS	Games started	MPG	Minutes per game	RPG	Rebounds per game
APG	Assists per game	SPG	Steals per game	BPG	Blocks per game	PPG	Points per game
TO	Turnovers per game	FG%	Field-goal percentage	3P%	3-point field-goal percentage	FT%	Free-throw percentage
**Bold**	Career best	°	League leader

=== Regular season ===
Year	Team	GP	GS	MPG	FG%	3P%	FT%	RPG	APG	SPG	BPG	TO	PPG
2006	Minnesota	**31**	0	**12.5**	**.359**	**.324**	.692	0.9	1.2	**0.3**	0.0	0.8	**3.4**
2007	Minnesota	5	0	9.6	.111	.125	**1.000**	**1.0**	**1.4**	0.2	0.0	0.8	1.4
2008	New York	6	0	7.5	.333	.250	**1.000**	0.3	0.5	0.0	0.0	0.8	1.8
Career	3 years, 2 teams	42	0	11.5	.336	.286	.755	0.9	1.1	0.2	0.0	0.8	2.9

== Coaching career ==
In 2009, Duffy retired from play and entered the coaching ranks as an assistant under Kim Barnes Arico at St. John's. Her initial responsibilities included guard skills, scouting, and game planning. In 2011–12, Duffy also became St. John's recruiting coordinator. In 2012, Duffy accepted the position as associate head coach with George Washington. In 2014, Duffy left George Washington to accept the position of assistant coach with the University of Michigan, where she spent three seasons before being named the head coach at Miami (OH) in 2017.

In two seasons with the Redhawks, Duffy accumulated a 44–20 overall record, including a 25–11 mark in league play. The team earned bids to the WNIT each season that she was there. In her first season at Miami in 2017–18, Duffy coached Miami to 21 wins, up from just 12 the previous season. This marked the largest improvement in the nation from the previous season in terms of total victories.

Duffy was named the head coach at Marquette on April 10, 2019, the sixth head coach in the program's history. Through three seasons, she boasts the best winning percentage of any coach in the program's history, going 66–26 (.717) overall and 40–16 (.713) in BIG EAST play. In her first year at MU, she was named the BIG EAST Coach of the Year after guiding the Golden Eagles to a runner-up finish in the league and a 22–7 overall record despite being picked ninth in the league's preseason coaches' poll. In November 2021, Duffy was named as one of the 40 Under 40 rising stars in women's basketball by The Athletic.

On April 3, 2024, Duffy was named the head coach of the Virginia Tech Hokies, the 8th coach in program history.

=== Stats ===
Sources:

- 2017–18 Schedule
- MAC 2017–18 Women's Basketball Standings

=== Head coaching record ===
Record table
Season	Team	Overall	Conference	Standing	Postseason
**Miami (OH) RedHawks** (Mid-American Conference) (2017–2019)
2017–18	Miami (OH)	21–11	12–6	2nd (East)	WNIT First Round
2018–19	Miami (OH)	23–9	13–5	2nd (East)	WNIT First Round
Miami (OH):		44–20 (.688)	25–11 (.694)		
**Marquette Golden Eagles** (Big East Conference) (2019–2024)
2019–20	Marquette	24–8	13–5	2nd	Post-season canceled - COVID-19
2020–21	Marquette	19–7	14–4	2nd	NCAA First Round
2021–22	Marquette	23–11	13–7	5th	WNIT Third Round
2022–23	Marquette	21–11	13–7	T-4th	NCAA First Round
2023–24	Marquette	23–9	11–7	T-3rd	NCAA First Round
Marquette:		110–46 (.705)	64–30 (.681)		
**Virginia Tech Hokies** (Atlantic Coast Conference) (2024–present)
2024–25	Virginia Tech	19–13	9–9	T-8th	WBIT Second Round
2025–26	Virginia Tech	23–10	12–6	T-5th	NCAA First Round
Virginia Tech:		42–22 (.656)	21–15 (.583)		
Total:		196–89 (.688)			
