= 2022–23 Marquette Golden Eagles women's basketball team =

American college basketball season

2022–23 Marquette Golden Eagles women's basketball
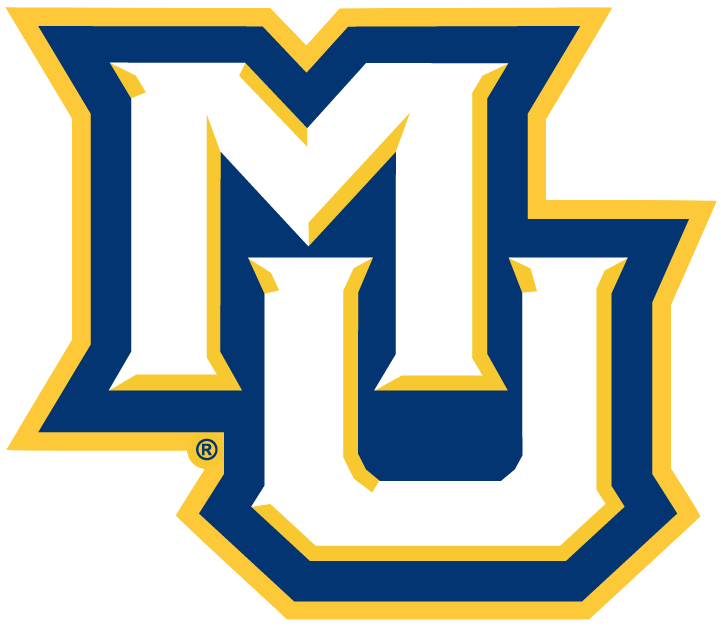

NCAA Tournament, First Round
- Conference: Big East Conference
- Record: 21–11 (13–7 Big East)
- Head coach: Megan Duffy (4th season)
- Assistant coaches: Kelly Komara; Justine Raterman; Tasha Taylor
- Home arena: Al McGuire Center

2022–23 Big East women's basketball standings
	Conf.				Overall
Team	W		L	PCT	W		L	PCT
No. 6 UConn†	18	–	2	.900	31	–	6	.838
No. 10т Villanova	17	–	3	.850	30	–	7	.811
Creighton	15	–	5	.750	22	–	9	.710
St. John's	13	–	7	.650	23	–	9	.719
Marquette	13	–	7	.650	21	–	11	.656
Seton Hall	10	–	10	.500	19	–	14	.576
DePaul	8	–	12	.400	16	–	17	.485
Georgetown	6	–	14	.300	14	–	17	.452
Butler	6	–	14	.300	11	–	19	.367
Providence	4	–	16	.200	13	–	19	.406
Xavier	0	–	20	.000	7	–	23	.233
† 2023 Big East tournament winner As of March 24, 2023; Rankings from AP poll

The 2022–23 Marquette Golden Eagles women's basketball team represented Marquette University in the 2022–23 NCAA Division I women's basketball season. The Golden Eagles, led by fourth year head coach Megan Duffy, played their home games at the Al McGuire Center and are members of the Big East Conference.

On February 8, 2023, the Golden Eagles defeated the UConn Huskies for the first time in program history, ending an all-time 0-16 losing streak. It was the first time since 1993 that UConn lost two games in a row, ending a 1,083 game streak without back-to-back losses.

== Previous season ==
The Golden Eagles finished the season at 23–11 and 13–7 in Big East play to finish in fifth place. They defeated DePaul in the quarterfinals of the Big East women's tournament before losing to UConn in the semifinals.

== Offseason ==
=== Departures ===
Marquette Departures
Name	Num	Pos.	Height	Year	Hometown	Reason for Departure
Antwainette Walker	4	G	5'11"	Junior	Lisle, IL	Transferred to Eastern Kentucky
Karissa McLaughlin	12	G	5'7"	GS Senior	Fort Wayne, IN	Graduated
Danyel Middleton	25	G	5'10"	Sophomore	Chicago, IL	Transferred to UIC
Lauren Van Kleunen	42	F	6'2"	GS Senior	Mason, OH	Graduated

=== Incoming transfers ===
Marquette incoming transfers
Name	Num	Pos.	Height	Year	Hometown	Previous School
Nia Clark	1	G	5'9"	RS Junior	Indianapolis, IN	Xavier

==== Recruiting ====
College recruiting information
Name	Hometown	School	Height	Weight	Commit date
Emily La Chapell; G	Appleton, WI	Appleton East High School	5 ft 10 in (1.78 m)	N/A	
Emily La Chapell; G	Recruit ratings: ESPN: (92)				
Overall recruit ranking:
Note: In many cases, Scout, Rivals, 247Sports, On3, and ESPN may conflict in their listings of height and weight.; In these cases, the average was taken. ESPN grades are on a 100-point scale.; Sources: "2022 Player Commits". ESPN. Archived from the original on March 13, 2023.

== Roster ==
2022–23 Marquette Golden Eagles women's basketball team
Players
Coaches

Pos.	#	Name	Height	Year	Previous school	Hometown
F	0	Julianna Okosun	6 ft 4 in (1.93 m)	Jr	Falkonergarden and HF-Kursus	Copenhagen, Denmark
G	1	Nia Clark	5 ft 9 in (1.75 m)	RS Sr	Ben Davis; Xavier	Indianapolis, IN
G	3	Rose Nkumu	5 ft 7 in (1.7 m)	Jr	Iowa City	Iowa City, IA
G	10	Claire Kaifes	5 ft 11 in (1.8 m)	Sr	Mill Valley	Shawnee, KS
G	12	Mackenzie Hare	5 ft 9 in (1.75 m)	Fr	Naperville North	Naperville, IL
G	21	Emily La Chapell	5 ft 11 in (1.8 m)	Fr	Appleton East	Appleton, WI
G	23	Jordan King	5 ft 11 in (1.8 m)	Sr	Hononegah	Rockton, IL
F	24	Makiyah Williams	6 ft 0 in (1.83 m)	So	Trinity	Chicago, IL
F	32	Liza Karlen	6 ft 2 in (1.88 m)	Sr	Stillwater Area	St. Paul, MN
F	44	Kennedi Myles	6 ft 2 in (1.88 m)	Jr	Walnut Hills	Cincinnati, OH
F	52	Chloe Marotta	6 ft 1 in (1.85 m)	Sr	Homestead	Mequon, WI
G		Nirel Lougbo	5 ft 10 in (1.78 m)	RS Jr	Tabor	North Andover, MA

Head coach

- Megan Duffy (Notre Dame)

Assistant coach(es)

- Kelly Komara (Purdue)
- Justine Raterman (Dayton)
- Tasha Taylor (Clemson)

Legend

- (C) Team captain
- (S) Suspended
- (I) Ineligible
- (W) Walk-on
- Injured
- Current redshirt

Roster

== Schedule ==
Date time, TV	Rank^{#}	Opponent^{#}	Result	Record	High points	High rebounds	High assists	Site (attendance) city, state
Regular season
November 7, 2022*; 12:00 p.m., FloSports		Fairleigh Dickinson	W 75–47	1–0	24 – King	12 – Karlen	8 – King	Al McGuire Center (3,061); Milwaukee, WI
November 11, 2022*; 7:00 p.m., FloSports		Holy Cross	W 75–55	2–0	18 – Tied	8 – Marotta	4 – King	Al McGuire Center (1,283); Milwaukee, WI
November 13, 2022*; 2:00 p.m., FloSports		Milwaukee	W 73–47	3–0	19 – Marotta	16 – Marotta	7 – King	Al McGuire Center (1,320); Milwaukee, WI
November 19, 2022*; 2:00 p.m., FloSports		vs. No. 3 Texas; Battle 4 Atlantis quarterfinals	W 68–61	4–0	25 – King	11 – Karlen	3 – Tied	Imperial Arena (376); Nassau, Bahamas
November 20, 2022*; 1:30 p.m., FloHoops		vs. Gonzaga; Battle 4 Atlantis semifinals	W 70–66	5–0	18 – Marotta	9 – King	4 – Tied	Imperial Arena (103); Nassau, Bahamas
November 21, 2022*; 11:00 a.m., ESPN2		vs. No. 20 UCLA; Battle 4 Atlantis championship	L 58–66 ^{OT}	5–1	15 – Marotta	8 – Karlen	3 – Nkumu	Imperial Arena (572); Nassau, Bahamas
November 27, 2022*; 2:00 p.m., FloSports		Saint Francis (PA)	W 83–40	6–1	18 – Karlen	9 – Marotta	4 – Clark	Al McGuire Center (1,010); Milwaukee, WI
December 2, 2022; 10:00 a.m., BEDN	No. 24	at Georgetown	W 78–57	7–1 (1–0)	23 – King	14 – Marotta	8 – Marotta	McDonough Gymnasium (2,319); Washington, D.C.
December 4, 2022; 12:00 p.m., BEDN	No. 24	at Seton Hall	L 78–82	7–2 (1–1)	30 – Marotta	12 – Marotta	5 – King	Walsh Gymnasium (952); South Orange, NJ
December 7, 2022*; 7:00 p.m., FloSports		Morgan State	Canceled					Al McGuire Center; Milwaukee, WI
December 10, 2022*; 2:00 p.m., FloSports		Loyola–Chicago	W 77–53	8–2	30 – King	12 – Karlen	7 – Nkumu	Al McGuire Center (1,671); Milwaukee, WI
December 18, 2022; 2:00 p.m., BEDN		at Butler	W 67–46	9–2 (2–1)	15 – Nkumu	11 – Karlen	4 – Tied	Al McGuire Center (1,905); Milwaukee, WI
December 21, 2022*; 12:00 p.m., FloSports		Colorado	L 48–71	9–3	10 – King	7 – King	4 – King	Al McGuire Center (2,019); Milwaukee, WI
December 28, 2022; 7:00 p.m., BEDN		Villanova	L 52–54	9–4 (2–2)	23 – King	11 – King	3 – Karlen	Al McGuire Center (1,921); Milwaukee, WI
December 31, 2022; 1:00 p.m., SNY		at No. 8 UConn	L 48–61	9–5 (2–3)	15 – Karlen	6 – Karlen	3 – Nkumu	Harry A. Gampel Pavilion (9,414); Storrs, CT
January 4, 2023; 7:00 p.m., BEDN		at DePaul	W 72–63	10–5 (3–3)	23 – King	10 – Marotta	9 – King	Wintrust Arena (1,583); Chicago, IL
January 8, 2022; 3:00 p.m., CBSSN		at No. 25 Creighton	L 42–68	10–6 (3–4)	20 – Marotta	6 – Kaifes	4 – Tied	D. J. Sokol Arena (1,087); Omaha, NE
January 14, 2023; 2:00 p.m., BEDN		Providence	W 80–57	11–6 (4–4)	31 – King	8 – Kaifes	6 – Nkumu	Al McGuire Center (1,823); Milwaukee, WI
January 18, 2023; 6:00 p.m., BEDN		at St. John's	L 61–66	11–7 (4–5)	27 – King	12 – Marotta	4 – Tied	Carnesecca Arena (498); Queens, NY
January 22, 2023; 2:00 p.m., FS1		Seton Hall	W 80–61	12–7 (5–5)	19 – Marotta	12 – Marotta	7 – Nkumu	Al McGuire Center (1,325); Milwaukee, WI
January 25, 2023; 7:00 p.m., BEDN		Xavier	W 64–40	13–7 (6–5)	17 – King	16 – Marotta	4 – Tied	Al McGuire Center (1,225); Milwaukee, WI
January 29, 2023; 1:00 p.m., BEDN		at Butler	W 65–63	14–7 (7–5)	27 – Marotta	14 – Marotta	8 – King	Hinkle Fieldhouse (1,074); Indianapolis, IN
February 1, 2023; 5:30 p.m., FS2		at No. 19 Villanova	L 54–73	14–8 (7–6)	18 – King	9 – Marotta	3 – Myles	Finneran Pavilion (1,841); Villanova, PA
February 4, 2023; 5:00 p.m., BEDN		Georgetown	W 66–49	15–8 (8–6)	23 – King	13 – Marotta	5 – Tied	Al McGuire Center (1,383); Milwaukee, WI
February 8, 2023; 7:00 p.m., SNY		No. 4 UConn	W 59–52	16–8 (9–6)	15 – Marotta	10 – Karlen	4 – Karlen	Al McGuire Center (2,565); Milwaukee, WI
February 15, 2023; 6:00 p.m., BEDN		at Providence	W 52–51	17–8 (10–6)	26 – Marotta	9 – Marotta	5 – Nkumu	Alumni Hall (306); Providence, RI
February 18, 2023; 2:00 p.m., BEDN		St. John's	W 61–38	18–8 (11–6)	24 – King	12 – Marotta	7 – Nkumu	Al McGuire Center (2,376); Milwaukee, WI
February 22, 2023; 7:00 p.m., FloSports		Creighton	L 44–55	18–9 (11–7)	13 – Marotta	7 – Marotta	5 – King	Al McGuire Center (1,232); Milwaukee, WI
February 25, 2023; 1:00 p.m., BEDN		at Xavier	W 58–46	19–9 (12–7)	19 – King	9 – Marotta	6 – Marotta	Cintas Center (791); Cincinnati, OH
February 27, 2023; 8:00 p.m., FS1		DePaul	W 98–80	20–9 (13–7)	26 – Karlen	14 – Karlen	8 – Nkumu	Al McGuire Center (1,382); Milwaukee, WI
Big East Tournament
March 4, 2023; 1:30 p.m., FS2	(5)	vs. (4) St. John's; Quarterfinals	W 57–47	21–9	18 – Marotta	14 – Marotta	5 – King	Mohegan Sun Arena (7,407); Uncasville, CT
March 5, 2023; 2:00 p.m., FS1	(5)	vs. (1) No. 9 UConn; Semifinals	L 52–81	21–10	18 – Karlen	8 – Marotta	5 – King	Mohegan Sun Arena (7,712); Uncasville, CT
NCAA tournament
March 17, 2023*; 10:30 a.m., ESPN2	(8 G1)	vs. (9 G1) South Florida; First Round	L 65–67 ^{OT}	21–11	25 – Marotta	10 – Karlen	3 – Tied	Colonial Life Arena; Columbia, SC
*Non-conference game. ^{#}Rankings from AP Poll. (#) Tournament seedings in parentheses. G1=Greenville 1. All times are in Central.

== Rankings ==
Ranking movements Legend: ██ Increase in ranking ██ Decrease in ranking — = Not ranked RV = Received votes
	Week																				
Poll	Pre	1	2	3	4	5	6	7	8	9	10	11	12	13	14	15	16	17	18	19	Final
AP	—	—*	—	RV	24	RV	RV	RV	RV	—	—	—	—	—	—	RV	RV	—	—	—	Not released
Coaches	—	—*	—^	25	24	RV	RV	RV	RV	—	—	—	—	—	—	—	RV	—	—	—	

*The preseason and week 1 polls were the same.
^Coaches did not release a week 2 poll.

== See also ==
- 2022–23 Marquette Golden Eagles men's basketball team
