= 2022–23 St. John's Red Storm women's basketball team =

American college basketball season

2022–23 St. John's Red Storm women's basketball

NCAA Tournament, First Round
- Conference: Big East Conference
- Record: 23–9 (13–7 Big East)
- Head coach: Joe Tartamella (11th season)
- Assistant coaches: Candice Walker; Shenneika Smith; Joe Rutigliano
- Home arena: Carnesecca Arena

2022–23 Big East women's basketball standings
	Conf.				Overall
Team	W		L	PCT	W		L	PCT
No. 6 UConn†	18	–	2	.900	31	–	6	.838
No. 10т Villanova	17	–	3	.850	30	–	7	.811
Creighton	15	–	5	.750	22	–	9	.710
St. John's	13	–	7	.650	23	–	9	.719
Marquette	13	–	7	.650	21	–	11	.656
Seton Hall	10	–	10	.500	19	–	14	.576
DePaul	8	–	12	.400	16	–	17	.485
Georgetown	6	–	14	.300	14	–	17	.452
Butler	6	–	14	.300	11	–	19	.367
Providence	4	–	16	.200	13	–	19	.406
Xavier	0	–	20	.000	7	–	23	.233
† 2023 Big East tournament winner As of March 24, 2023; Rankings from AP poll

The 2022–23 St. John's Red Storm women's basketball team represent St. John's University during the 2022–23 NCAA Division I women's basketball season. The Red Storm, led by eleventh-year head coach Joe Tartamella, play their games at Carnesecca Arena and are members of the Big East Conference.

== Previous season ==
The Red Storm finished the season at 12–19 and 7–12 in Big East play to finish in seventh place. They defeated Xavier in the first round of the Big East women's tournament before losing to Villanova in the quarterfinals.

== Offseason ==
=== Departures ===
St. John's departures
Name	Num	Pos.	Height	Year	Hometown	Reason for departure
Name	Number	Pos.	Height	Year	Hometown	Reason for departure
Leilani Correa	2	G	6'0"	Junior	Manchester, NJ	Transferred to Florida
Sara Zabrecky	5	F	5'9"	Sophomore	Munster, IN	Transferred to UIC
Sophia Nolan	14	F	6'1"	Junior	Valparaiso, IN	Transferred to Loyola–Chicago
Camree Gregg	22	G	5'5"	GS senior	Westland, MI	Graduated
Emma Nolan	41	F	6'1"	Junior	Valparaiso, IN	Transferred to Loyola–Chicago
Idan Shlush	45	G	5'7"	Freshman	Gedera, Israel	Transferred to Maine

=== Incoming transfers ===
St. John's incoming transfers
Name	Num	Pos.	Height	Year	Hometown	Previous school
Name	Number	Pos.	Height	Year	Hometown	Previous school
Mimi Reid	2	G	5'8"	GS senior	The Bronx, NY	Ole Miss
Jayla Everett	4	G	5'10"	Senior	St Louis, MO	Pittsburgh
Jillian Archer	14	F	6'2"	GS senior	Santa Monica, CA	Georgetown

==== Recruiting ====
There was no recruiting class of 2022.

== Roster ==
2022–23 St. John's Red Storm women's basketball team
Players
Coaches

Pos.	#	Name	Height	Year	Previous school	Hometown
G	1	Unique Drake	5 ft 7 in (1.7 m)	Sr	Westwood	Columbia, SC
G	2	Mimi Reid	5 ft 8 in (1.73 m)	GS	The Patrick School; Ole Miss	Bronx, NY
F	3	Danielle Patterson	6 ft 2 in (1.88 m)	GS	Mary Louis; Indiana	Brooklyn, NY
G	4	Jayla Everett	5 ft 10 in (1.78 m)	RS Sr	Kirkwood HS; Pittsburgh	St. Louis, MO
G	5	Jailah Donald	5 ft 7 in (1.7 m)	Fr	Serra	Inglewood, CA
G	11	Sitota Gines	5 ft 10 in (1.78 m)	So	JMA Academy	Zagagoza, Spain
G	12	Skye Owen	5 ft 7 in (1.7 m)	Fr	St. Francis Prep	Staten Island, NY
F	13	Danielle Cosgrove	6 ft 4 in (1.93 m)	RS Sr	Sachem East; Notre Dame	Holbrook, NY
F	14	Jillian Archer	6 ft 2 in (1.88 m)	GS	Bishop Alemany; Georgetown	Santa Monica, CA
F	20	Rayven Peeples	6 ft 3 in (1.91 m)	RS Sr	John Hardin; Northwest Florida State College	Detroit, MI
G	30	Kadaja Bailey	6 ft 0 in (1.83 m)	RS Sr	St. Mary's	Long Beach, NY
G	33	Katie Burton	5 ft 9 in (1.75 m)	So	Fisher	Fishers, IN

Head coach

- Joe Tartamella (James Madison)

Assistant coach(es)

- Candice Walker (Loyola (MD))
- Shenneika Smith (St. John's)
- Joe Rutigliano (Saint Francis (PA))

Legend

- (C) Team captain
- (S) Suspended
- (I) Ineligible
- (W) Walk-on
- Injured
- Current redshirt

Roster

== Schedule ==
Date time, TV	Rank^{#}	Opponent^{#}	Result	Record	High points	High rebounds	High assists	Site (attendance) city, state
Regular season
November 7, 2022*; 1:00 p.m., FloSports		Monmouth	W 78–39	1–0	23 – Bailey	9 – Tied	4 – Reid	Carnesecca Arena (329); Queens, NY
November 11, 2022*; 7:00 p.m., FloSports		St. Francis Brooklyn	W 73–51	2–0	23 – Bailey	9 – Peeples	4 – Tied	Carnesecca Arena (526); Queens, NY
November 16, 2022*; 7:00 p.m., FloSports		Temple	W 66–54	3–0	18 – Peeples	17 – Peeples	7 – Everett	Carnesecca Arena (247); Queens, NY
November 19, 2022*; 2:00 p.m., FloSports		Stony Brook	W 78–52	4–0	16 – Everett	13 – Archer	7 – Everett	Carnesecca Arena; Queens, NY
November 25, 2022*; 6:30 p.m., FloSports		vs. Memphis; Las Vegas Invitational	W 61–57	5–0	16 – Everett	10 – Archer	4 – Reid	The Mirage; Paradise, NV
November 26, 2022*; 4:15 p.m., FloSports		vs. UTSA; Las Vegas Invitational	W 69–64	6–0	15 – Bailey	6 – Tied	5 – Reid	The Mirage; Paradise, NV
December 2, 2022; 7:00 p.m., BEDN		at Butler	W 65–57	7–0 (1–0)	16 – Bailey	11 – Peeples	7 – Reid	Hinkle Fieldhouse (735); Indianapolis, IN
December 4, 2022; 2:00 p.m., BEDN		No. 13 Creighton	W 66–62	8–0 (2–0)	20 – Everett	11 – Peeples	3 – Reid	Carnesecca Arena (394); Queens, NY
December 8, 2022*; 7:00 p.m., FloSports		Iona	W 77–51	9–0	19 – Archer	11 – Archer	5 – Everett	Carnesecca Arena (334); Queens, NY
December 11, 2022*; 2:00 p.m., FloSports		Bethune–Cookman	W 73–52	10–0	19 – Everett	14 – Archer	7 – Reid	Carnesecca Arena (275); Queens, NY
December 18, 2022; 4:30 p.m., FS1		Providence	W 63–55	11–0 (3–0)	21 – Everett	14 – Peeples	4 – Tied	Carnesecca Arena (363); Queens, NY
December 21, 2022*; 2:00 p.m., FloSports	No. 25	Wagner	W 80–51	12–0	24 – Everett	9 – Tied	7 – Bailey	Carnesecca Arena (162); Queens, NY
December 31, 2022; 12:00 p.m., BEDN	No. 25	at Georgetown	W 68–47	13–0 (4–0)	20 – Everett	17 – Archer	7 – Reid	McDonough Gymnasium (323); Washington, D.C.
January 4, 2023; 7:00 p.m., BEDN	No. 24	at Seton Hall	L 51–72	13–1 (4–1)	18 – Bailey	12 – Archer	4 – Everett	Walsh Gymnasium (1,009); South Orange, NJ
January 8, 2023; 2:00 p.m., BEDN	No. 24	Xavier	W 71–52	14–1 (5–1)	26 – Everett	13 – Archer	3 – Tied	Carnesecca Arena (475); Queens, NY
January 11, 2023; 8:00 p.m., SNY		No. 4 UConn	L 52–82	14–2 (5–2)	17 – Bailey	11 – Peeples	4 – Bailey	UBS Arena (2,910); Elmont, NY
January 14, 2023; 2:00 p.m., BEDN		at No. 25 Villanova	L 61–64	14–3 (5–3)	18 – Everett	11 – Peeples	3 – Everett	Finneran Pavilion (2,103); Villanova, PA
January 18, 2023; 7:00 p.m., BEDN		Marquette	W 66–61	15–3 (6–3)	18 – Tied	8 – Peeples	4 – Everett	Carnesecca Arena (498); Queens, NY
January 21, 2023; 5:00 p.m., BEDN		at DePaul	W 81–72	16–3 (7–3)	24 – Everett	11 – Archer	4 – Bailey	Wintrust Arena (1,648); Chicago, IL
January 25, 2022; 7:00 p.m., BEDN		Butler	W 67–65	17–3 (8–3)	16 – Drake	6 – Tied	4 – Drake	Carnesecca Arena (367); Queens, NY
January 31, 2022; 7:00 p.m., MSG		Seton Hall	L 58–68	17–4 (8–4)	14 – Everett	12 – Peeples	5 – Reid	Carnesecca Arena (512); Queens, NY
February 4, 2023; 2:00 p.m., BEDN		at Creighton	L 65–81	17–5 (8–5)	15 – Bailey	5 – Tied	3 – Tied	D. J. Sokol Arena (1,315); Omaha, NE
February 8, 2023; 7:00 p.m., BEDN		at Xavier	W 73–52	18–5 (9–5)	15 – Bailey	9 – Archer	6 – Bailey	Cintas Center (484); Cincinnati, OH
February 11, 2023; 4:00 p.m., BEDN		DePaul	W 77–61	19–5 (10–5)	26 – Everett	11 – Tied	4 – Everett	Carnesecca Arena (491); Queens, NY
February 15, 2023; 7:00 p.m., BEDN		No. 14 Villanova	L 57–73	19–6 (10–6)	23 – Reid	8 – Archer	4 – Bailey	Carnesecca Arena (1,026); Queens, NY
February 18, 2023; 3:00 p.m., BEDN		at Marquette	L 38–61	19–7 (10–7)	10 – Tied	8 – Peeples	3 – Bailey	Al McGuire Center (2,376); Milwaukee, WI
February 21, 2023; 7:00 p.m., SNY		at No. 4 UConn	W 69–64	20–7 (11–7)	20 – Bailey	12 – Peeples	6 – Everett	XL Center (9,324); Hartford, CT
February 24, 2023; 7:00 p.m., BEDN		Georgetown	W 61–53	21–7 (12–7)	17 – Everett	9 – Bailey	4 – Tied	Carnesecca Arena (662); Queens, NY
February 27, 2023; 7:00 p.m., BEDN		at Providence	W 53–50	22–7 (13–7)	18 – Everett	12 – Peoples	3 – Bailey	Alumni Hall (612); Providence, RI
Big East Women's Tournament
March 4, 2023; 2:30 p.m., FS2	(4)	vs. (5) Marquette; Quarterfinals	L 47–57	22–8	11 – Reid	10 – Peeples	3 – Everett	Mohegan Sun Arena (7,407); Uncasville, CT
NCAA tournament
March 16, 2023*; 7:00 p.m., ESPN2	(11 S3)	vs. (11 S3) Purdue; First Four	W 66–64	23–8	20 – Everett	7 – Peeples	7 – Bailey	Value City Arena (817); Columbus, OH
March 16, 2023*; 4:00 p.m., ESPN	(11 S3)	vs. (6 S3) No. 20 North Carolina; First Round	L 59–61	23–9	17 – Everett	10 – Archer	3 – Tied	Value City Arena (6,828); Columbus, OH
*Non-conference game. ^{#}Rankings from AP Poll. (#) Tournament seedings in parentheses. S3=Seattle 3. All times are in Eastern Time.

== Rankings ==
Ranking movements Legend: ██ Increase in ranking ██ Decrease in ranking — = Not ranked RV = Received votes
	Week																				
Poll	Pre	1	2	3	4	5	6	7	8	9	10	11	12	13	14	15	16	17	18	19	Final
AP	—	—*	—	—	—	RV	RV	25	25	24	RV	—	—	—	—	—	—				Not released
Coaches	—	—*	—^	RV	—	RV	RV	RV	24	23	RV	RV	RV	RV	—	—	—				

*The preseason and week 1 polls were the same.
^Coaches did not release a week 2 poll.
