= Ice Brady =

American basketball player (born 2004)

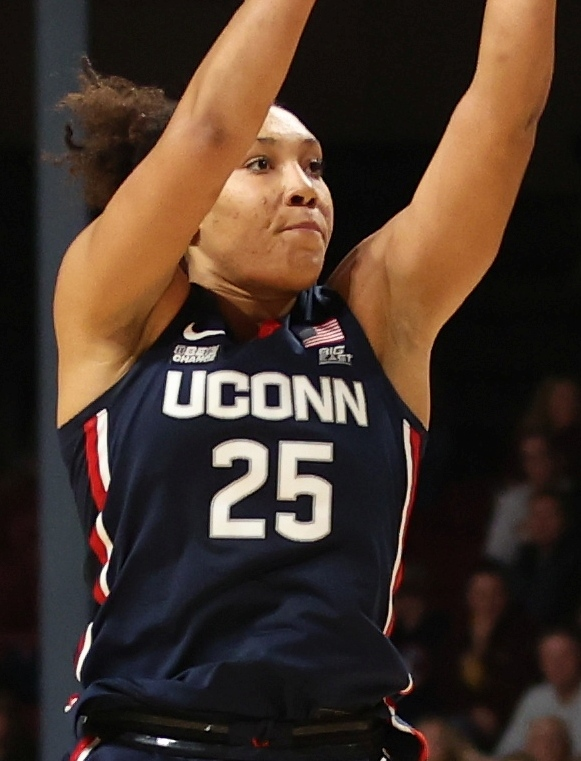
- Brady in 2023

No. 25 – Florida State Seminoles
- Position: Forward
- League: Atlantic Coast Conference

Personal information
- Born: May 28, 2004 (age 22)
- Listed height: 6 ft 3 in (1.91 m)

Career information
- High school: Cathedral Catholic (San Diego, California)
- College: UConn (2023–2026); Florida State (2026–present)

Career highlights
- NCAA champion (2025); McDonald's All-American Game (2022); Jordan Brand Classic (2022)
Medals
Women's basketball
Representing the United States
FIBA Under-18 Americas Championship
Gold medal – first place	2022 Argentina	Team

Isuneh "Ice" Brady (born May 28, 2004) is an American college basketball player for the Florida State Seminoles of the Atlantic Coast Conference. She previously played for the UConn Huskies.

== Early life ==
Brady attended Cathedral Catholic High School in San Diego, California. She averaged 20.7 points, 12.8 rebounds and 1.8 blocks as a senior and was named a McDonald’s All-American in 2022. Brady also played for the Cal Sparks, an Amateur Athletic Union team. As the nation's No. 5 recruit in the class of 2022, she committed to play college basketball at UConn.

== College career ==
=== UConn ===
Before Brady's freshman season in 2022–23, she suffered a dislocated patella in her right knee at practice and missed the entire year.

She made her collegiate debut vs. Dayton, recording three points and rebounds in 11 minutes. Brady played in all 39 games and started in three, averaging 4.5 points, 3.3 rebounds and 1.1 assists per game. She was also named to the 2024 BIG EAST All-Tournament Team.

In 2024–25, Brady appeared in 32 games and started in 12, averaging 3.6 points, 2.8 rebounds and 1.7 assists. She played 13 minutes in the National Championship game as UConn defeated South Carolina, 82–59.

After playing in just two games, Brady missed the rest of the 2025–26 due to a knee injury and subsequent successful surgery.

=== Florida State ===
On April 26, 2026, Brady announced she would transfer to play for the Florida State Seminoles.

== National team career ==
On June 3, 2022, Brady was named to the United States under-18 national team for the 2022 FIBA Under-18 Women's Americas Championship. She averaged 13.0 points, 7.5 rebounds, 1.7 assists and 1.3 steals per game in the tournament, en route to a gold medal. In a game against Canada, she recorded 15 rebounds, which tied the U.S. record for most rebounds in women's under-18 play.

== Career statistics ==
Legend
GP	Games played	GS	Games started	MPG	Minutes per game	RPG	Rebounds per game
APG	Assists per game	SPG	Steals per game	BPG	Blocks per game	PPG	Points per game
TO	Turnovers per game	FG%	Field-goal percentage	3P%	3-point field-goal percentage	FT%	Free-throw percentage
**Bold**	Career best	°	League leader

*	Denotes seasons in which Brady won an NCAA Championship

=== College ===
Year	Team	GP	GS	MPG	FG%	3P%	FT%	RPG	APG	SPG	BPG	TO	PPG
2022–23	UConn	Did not play due to injury											
2023–24	UConn	**39**	3	**17.5**	43.6	24.0	60.0	**3.3**	1.1	0.5	**0.4**	**1.2**	**4.5**
2024–25*	UConn	32	**12**	15.7	**50.5**	**27.3**	68.0	2.8	**1.7**	**0.6**	**0.4**	0.9	3.6
2025–26	UConn	2	0	11.5	50.0	0.0	**100.0**	3.0	0.5	0.5	0.0	0.0	2.5
Career		73	15	16.5	46.2	24.3	63.4	3.1	1.3	0.5	0.4	1.0	4.0
