= 2022–23 Providence Friars women's basketball team =

Intercollegiate basketball season

2022–23 Providence Friars women's basketball
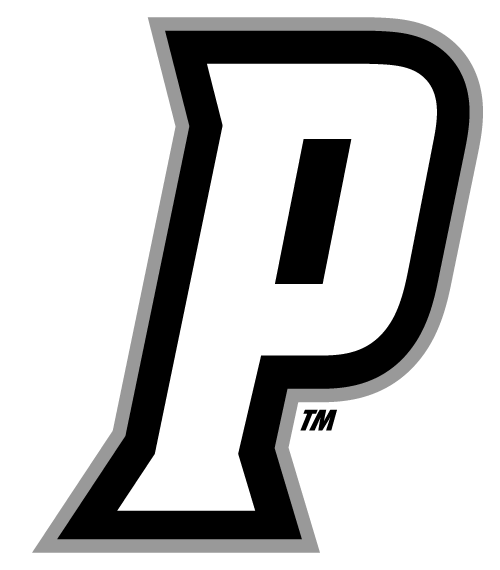
- Conference: Big East
- Record: 13–19 (4–16 Big East)
- Head coach: Jim Crowley (7th season)
- Assistant coaches: Tiara Johnson; Jessica Jenkins; Kelcie Rombach
- Home arena: Alumni Hall

2022–23 Big East women's basketball standings
| | Conf. | | | | Overall |
| Team | W | | L | PCT | W | | L | PCT |
|---|---|---|---|---|---|---|---|---|
| No. 6 UConn† | 18 | – | 2 | .900 | 31 | – | 6 | .838 |
| No. 10т Villanova | 17 | – | 3 | .850 | 30 | – | 7 | .811 |
| Creighton | 15 | – | 5 | .750 | 22 | – | 9 | .710 |
| St. John's | 13 | – | 7 | .650 | 23 | – | 9 | .719 |
| Marquette | 13 | – | 7 | .650 | 21 | – | 11 | .656 |
| Seton Hall | 10 | – | 10 | .500 | 19 | – | 14 | .576 |
| DePaul | 8 | – | 12 | .400 | 16 | – | 17 | .485 |
| Georgetown | 6 | – | 14 | .300 | 14 | – | 17 | .452 |
| Butler | 6 | – | 14 | .300 | 11 | – | 19 | .367 |
| Providence | 4 | – | 16 | .200 | 13 | – | 19 | .406 |
| Xavier | 0 | – | 20 | .000 | 7 | – | 23 | .233 |
† 2023 Big East tournament winner As of March 24, 2023; Rankings from AP poll

The 2022–23 Providence Friars women's basketball team represent Providence College in the 2022–23 NCAA Division I women's basketball season.

== Roster ==
2022–23 Providence Friars women's basketball team
Players
Coaches

| Pos. | # | Name | Height | Year | Previous school | Hometown |
|---|---|---|---|---|---|---|
| G | 1 | Kylee Sheppard | 5 ft 9 in (1.75 m) | So | Roger Bacon | Cincinnati, OH |
| G | 2 | Grace Efosa-Aguebor | 5 ft 11 in (1.8 m) | Jr | Whittier Tech | Lawrence, MA |
| G | 3 | Megan Huerter | 5 ft 11 in (1.8 m) | So | Shenendehowa | Clifton, NY |
| G | 5 | Janai Crooms | 5 ft 10 in (1.78 m) | Sr | St. Andrews | Cranston, RI |
| G | 11 | Nariah Scott | 5 ft 10 in (1.78 m) | So | Tabor | Holden, MA |
| F | 12 | Logan Cook | 6 ft 1 in (1.85 m) | GS | Iowa City West; Iowa | Iowa City, IA |
| G/F | 15 | Lauren Sampson | 6 ft 0 in (1.83 m) | Sr | Waltham | Waltham, MA |
| G | 22 | Brynn Farrell | 6 ft 0 in (1.83 m) | Jr | St. Rose HS; Florida | Ortley Beach, NJ |
| G | 24 | Audrey Koch | 5 ft 10 in (1.78 m) | So | Iowa City West | Iowa City, IA |
| G | 30 | Kammie Ludwig | 5 ft 10 in (1.78 m) | Fr | Geneseo HS | Geneseo, IL |
| F | 31 | Olivia Olsen | 6 ft 3 in (1.91 m) | So | Niskayuna | Niskayuna, NY |
| F | 33 | Emily Archibald | 6 ft 0 in (1.83 m) | So | Kennebunk | Kennebunk, MA |

Head coach

- Jim Crowley

Assistant coach(es)

- Tiara Johnson (St. Bonaventure)
- Jessica Jenkins (St. Bonaventure)
- Kelcie Rombach (St. Bonaventure)

Legend

- (C) Team captain
- (S) Suspended
- (I) Ineligible
- (W) Walk-on
- Injured
- Current redshirt

Roster
Last update: December 23, 2023

== Schedule ==
| Date time, TV | Rank^{#} | Opponent^{#} | Result | Record | Site (attendance) city, state |
regular season
| Nov 7, 2022*; 7:00 p.m., FloSports | | Dayton | W 69–60 | 1–0 | Alumni Hall (367); Providence, RI |
| Nov 11, 2022*; 7:00 p.m., FloSports | | Stonehill | W 56–32 | 2–0 | Alumni Hall (330); Providence, RI |
| Nov 14, 2022*; 6:00 p.m., ESPN+ | | at Rhode Island; Ocean State Cup | L 72–74 | 2–1 | Ryan Center (1,065); Kingston, RI |
| Nov 17, 2022*; 7:00 p.m., ESPN+ | | at Iona | W 53–50 | 3–1 | Hynes Athletic Center (913); New Rochelle, NY |
| Nov 20, 2022*; 12:00 p.m., ACCNX | | Boston College | L 64–73 | 3–2 | Conte Forum (842); Chestnut Hill, MA |
| Nov 25, 2022*; 1:00 p.m., FloSports | | Hartford; Friar Thanksgiving Classic | W 60–30 | 4–2 | Alumni Hall (459); Providence, RI |
| Nov 26, 2022*; 3:00 p.m., FloSports | | Weber State; Friar Thanksgiving Classic | W 62–55 | 5–2 | Alumni Hall (303); Providence, RI |
| Nov 27, 2022*; 2:00 p.m., FloSports | | Bryant; Friar Thanksgiving Classic | W 85–60 | 6–2 | Alumni Hall (249); Providence, RI |
| Dec 2, 2022; 7:00 p.m., SNY | | at No. 3 UConn | L 53–98 | 6–3 (0–1) | Harry A. Gampel Pavilion (10,167); Storrs, CT |
| Dec 4, 2022; 1:00 p.m., BEDN/FloSports | | No. 25 Villanova | L 54–79 | 6–4 (0–2) | Alumni Hall (289); Providence, RI |
| Dec 7, 2022*; 7:00 p.m., FloSports | | Brown | W 62–44 | 7–4 | Alumni Hall (174); Providence, RI |
| Dec 10, 2022*; 1:00 p.m., FloSports | | Central Connecticut | W 77–45 | 8–4 | Alumni Hall (241); Providence, RI |
| Dec 18, 2022; 4:30 p.m., FS1 | | at St. John's | L 55–63 | 8–5 (0–3) | Carnesecca Arena (363); Queens, NY |
| December 20, 2022*; 11:00 a.m. | | Sacred Heart | W 64–52 | 9–5 | William H. Pitt Center (423); Fairfield, CT |
| Dec 28, 2022; 7:00 p.m., FloSports | | at DePaul | L 69–78 | 9–6 (0–4) | Wintrust Arena (1,081); Chicago, IL |
| Jan 4, 2023; 7:00 p.m., FloSports | | at Creighton | W 79–75 | 10–6 (1–4) | D. J. Sokol Arena (928); Omaha, NE |
| Jan 8, 2023; 1:00 p.m., FloSports | | Seton Hall | L 60–76 | 10–7 (1–5) | Alumni Hall (385); Providence, RI |
| Jan 11, 2023; 11:00 a.m., FloSports | | Xavier | W 64–50 | 11–7 (2–5) | Alumni Hall (1,125); Providence, RI |
| January 14, 2023; 3:00 p.m., BEDN/FloSports | | at Marquette | L 57–80 | 11–8 (2–6) | Al McGuire Center (1,823); Milwaukee, WI |
| Jan 18, 2023; 7:00 p.m., FloSports | | at Butler | W 74–66 | 12–8 (3–6) | Hinkle Fieldhouse (527); Indianapolis, IN |
| Jan 21, 2023; 5:00 p.m., FloSports | | Georgetown | L 51–61 | 12–9 (3–7) | Alumni Hall (609); Providence, RI |
| Jan 24, 2023; 7:00 p.m., FloSports | | Creighton | L 46–64 | 12–10 (3–8) | Alumni Hall (317); Providence, RI |
| Jan 28, 2023; 2:00 p.m., FloSports | | at Xavier | W 50–48 | 13–10 (4–8) | Cintas Center (932); Cincinnati, OH |
| Feb 1, 2023; 7:00 p.m., SNY | | No. 5 UConn | L 54–64 | 13–11 (4–9) | Alumni Hall (1,483); Providence, RI |
| Feb 4, 2023; 1:00 p.m., FloSports | | at Seton Hall | L 52–77 | 13–12 (4–10) | Walsh Gymnasium (1,123); South Orange, NJ |
| Feb 11, 2023; 1:00 p.m., FloSports | | Butler | L 62–63 | 13–13 (4–11) | Alumni Hall (430); Providence, RI |
| Feb 15, 2023; 7:00 p.m., FloSports | | Marquette | L 51–52 | 13–14 (4–12) | Alumni Hall (306); Providence, RI |
| Feb 18, 2023; 12:00 p.m., FloSports | | DePaul | L 64–86 | 13–15 (4–13) | Alumni Hall (385); Providence, RI |
| Feb 21, 2023; 7:00 p.m., FloSports | | at Georgetown | L 69–73 | 13–16 (4–14) | McDonough Gymnasium (471); Washington, D.C. |
| Feb 24, 2023; 7:00 p.m., BEDN/FloSports | | at No. 15 Villanova | L 50–67 | 13–17 (4–15) | Finneran Pavilion (3,321); Villanova, PA |
| Feb 27, 2023; 7:00 p.m., FloSports | | St. John's | L 50–53 | 13–18 (4–16) | Alumni Hall (612); Providence, RI |
Big East Tournament
| Mar 3, 2023*; 1:30 p.m., SNY | (10) | vs. (7) DePaul; First Round | L 54–67 | 13–19 | Mohegan Sun Arena (4,687); Uncasville, CT |
*Non-conference game. ^{#}Rankings from AP Poll. (#) Tournament seedings in parentheses. All times are in Eastern.
