= 2023–24 Mid-American Conference women's basketball season =

- League: NCAA Division I
- Sport: Basketball
- Teams: 12

Regular season
- League champions: Toledo
- Runners-up: Ball State
- Season MVP: Sophia Wiard

2024 MAC tournament

Tournament
- Champions: Kent State
- Runners-up: Buffalo
- Finals MVP: Katie Shumate

Mid-American women's basketball seasons
- 2022–23 2024–25

2023–24 Mid-American Conference women's basketball standings
	Conf.				Overall
Team	W		L	PCT	W		L	PCT
Toledo	17	–	1	.944	28	–	6	.824
Ball State	16	–	2	.889	28	–	6	.824
Kent State †	13	–	5	.722	21	–	12	.636
Buffalo	10	–	8	.556	19	–	14	.576
Bowling Green	10	–	8	.556	16	–	15	.516
Northern Illinois	8	–	10	.444	15	–	16	.484
Ohio	8	–	10	.444	11	–	19	.367
Western Michigan	7	–	11	.389	12	–	18	.400
Miami (OH)	6	–	12	.333	9	–	20	.310
Akron	6	–	12	.333	11	–	18	.379
Central Michigan	4	–	14	.222	6	–	22	.214
Eastern Michigan	3	–	15	.167	7	–	22	.241
† 2024 MAC tournament winner

The 2023–24 Mid-American Conference women's basketball season was the season for Mid-American Conference women's basketball teams. It began with practices in October 2023, followed by the start of the 2023–24 NCAA Division I women's basketball season in November. Conference play began in January 2024 and concluded in March 2024. The 2024 MAC tournament was held at Rocket Mortgage FieldHouse in Cleveland, Ohio for the 24th consecutive season.

Toledo won the regular season championship with a 17–1 record Sophia Wiard of Toledo won player of the year. In the 2024 MAC women's basketball tournament, Kent State defeated Northern Illinois, Ball State, and Buffalo to win their fourth MAC tournament title and first since 2002, and advance to the 2024 NCAA tournament. Katie Shumate was the tournament MVP.

== Head coaches ==
=== Coaching changes ===
==== Akron ====
On February 21, 2023 Akron announced that Melissa Jackson's contract would not be renewed at the end of the season. On March 29, 2023, Illinois assistant Ryan Gensler was named as the next head coach.

==== Bowling Green ====
On March 31, 2023, Robyn Fralick left the head coaching position at Bowling Green after a 31 win season to become the head coach at Michigan State On April 8, 2023, South Carolina assistant Fred Chmiel was named as the new head coach.

==== Central Michigan ====
Central Michigan fired Heather Oesterle on April 6, 2023, after win totals of four and six in her last two seasons. On April 20, 2023, they hired Michigan State assistant coach Kristin Haynie who, like Oesterle, had been an assistant at Central Michigan under head coach Sue Guevara when she retired in 2019.

==== Miami (OH) ====
On April 26, 2023 DeUnna Hendrix resigned after four seasons at Miami having posted a 35–80 record with the RedHawks after text messages led to allegations that she was in a relationship with a player. On May 8, 2023, Indiana associate head coach Glenn Box was announced as the new head coach.

==== Eastern Michigan ====
On December 11, 2023 Fred Castro was fired as Eastern Michigan's head coach after a 1–7 start. Assistant coach Ke'Sha Blanton was named as interim coach.

=== Coaches ===
Team	Head coach	Previous job	Years at school	Overall record	School record	MAC record	MAC titles	MAC Tournament titles	NCAA Tournaments	NCAA Final Fours	NCAA Championships
Akron	Ryan Gensler	Illinois (Asst.)	1	0–0 (–)	0–0 (–)	0–0 (–)	0	0	0	0	0
Ball State	Brady Sallee	Eastern Illinois	12	345–250 (.580)	209–140 (.599)	127–72 (.638)	0	0	0	0	0
Bowling Green	Fred Chmiel	South Carolina (Asst.)	1	0–0 (–)†	0–0 (–)	0–0 (–)	0	0	0	0	0
Buffalo	Becky Burke	USC Upstate	2	125–71 (.638)	12–16 (.429)	7–11 (.389)	0	0	0	0	0
Central Michigan	Kristin Haynie	Michigan State (Asst.)	1	0–0 (–)	0–0 (–)	0–0 (–)	0	0	0	0	0
Eastern Michigan	Fred Castro	Washington (Asst.)	8	79–121 (.395)	79–121 (.395)	40–84 (.323)	0	0	0	0	0
Kent State	Todd Starkey	Indiana (Asst.)	8	276–183 (.601)	122–88 (.581)	72–54 (.571)	0	0	0	0	0
Miami	Glenn Box	Indiana (Assoc HC.)	1	64–31 (.674)	0–0 (–)	0–0 (–)	0	0	0	0	0
Northern Illinois	Lisa Carlsen	Lewis	9	303–286 (.514)	119–122 (.494)	69–77 (.473)	0	0	0	0	0
Ohio	Bob Boldon	Youngstown State	11	283–210 (.574)	185–122 (.603)	106–74 (.589)	2	1	1	0	0
Toledo	Tricia Cullop	Evansville	16	448–273 (.621)	325–163 (.666)	177–87 (.670)	3	2	2	0	0
Western Michigan	Shane Clipfell	Michigan State (Assoc. HC)	12	231–220 (.512)	160–173 (.480)	87–113 (.435)	0	0	0	0	0

Notes:

- Appearances, titles, etc. are from time with current school only.
- Years at school includes 2023–24 season.
- MAC records are from time at current school only.
- All statistics and records are through the beginning of the season.
- †Chmiel's overall record does not include his coaching record at Feather River College and Lassen College because it is unknown to the author

== Preseason ==
The preseason coaches' poll and league awards were announced by the league office on November 2, 2023. Defending 2022–23 regular season champion Toledo was named the favorite.

=== Preseason women's basketball coaches poll ===
Women's Basketball Preseason Poll
Place	Team	Points	First place votes
1.	Toledo	121	11
2.	Ball State	110	1
3.	Kent State	102	--
4.	Bowling Green	77	--
5.	Northern Illinois	72	--
6.	Akron	69	--
7.	Eastern Michigan	66	--
8.	Buffalo	50	--
9.	Ohio	40	--
10.	Western Michigan	38	--
11.	Central Michigan	24	--
12.	Miami	23	--

MAC Tournament champions: Toledo (10), Ball State (2)

=== MAC Preseason All-Conference ===
Honor	Recipient
Preseason All-MAC First Team	Ally Becki, Forward, Ball State, Junior
Preseason All-MAC First Team	Chelby Koker, Guard, Northern Illinois, Fifth Year
Preseason All-MAC First Team	Katie Shumate, Guard, Kent State, Redshirt Senior
Preseason All-MAC First Team	Quinesha Lockett, Guard, Toledo, Fifth Year
Preseason All-MAC First Team	Reagan Bass, Forward, Akron, Junior
Preseason All-MAC Second Team	Lachelle Austin, Guard, Eastern Michigan, Junior
Preseason All-MAC Second Team	Lexi Fleming, Guard, Bowling Green, Senior
Preseason All-MAC Second Team	Nyla Hampton, Guard, Ball State, Junior
Preseason All-MAC Second Team	Sammi Mikonowicz, Guard/Forward, Toledo, Senior
Preseason All-MAC Second Team	Sophia Wiard, Guard, Toledo, Fifth Year

== Rankings ==
		Pre	Wk 2	Wk 3	Wk 4	Wk 5	Wk 6	Wk 7	Wk 8	Wk 9	Wk 10	Wk 11	Wk 12	Wk 13	Wk 14	Wk 15	Wk 16	Wk 17	Wk 18	Wk 19	Final
Akron	AP																				
Akron	C																				
Ball State	AP																				
Ball State	C												RV	RV	RV	RV	RV	RV	RV	RV	
Bowling Green	AP																				
Bowling Green	C																				
Buffalo	AP																				
Buffalo	C																				
Central Michigan	AP																				
Central Michigan	C																				
Eastern Michigan	AP																				
Eastern Michigan	C																				
Kent State	AP																				
Kent State	C																				
Miami	AP																				
Miami	C																				
Northern Illinois	AP																				
Northern Illinois	C																				
Ohio	AP																				
Ohio	C																				
Toledo	AP																		RV	RV	
Toledo	C	RV																	RV	RV	
Western Michigan	AP																				
Western Michigan	C																				

Legend
	Improvement in ranking
	Drop in ranking
	Not ranked previous week
	No change in ranking from previous week
RV	Received votes but were not ranked in Top 25 of poll
т	Tied with team above or below also with this symbol

Source - AP:

Coaches:

== All-MAC Awards ==
=== Mid-American women's basketball weekly awards ===
Week	Player(s) of the Week	School
Nov 13	Reagan Bass	Akron
Nov 20	Reagan Bass (2)	Akron
Nov 27	Reagan Bass (3)	Akron
Dec 4	Reagan Bass (4)	Akron
Dec 11	Corynne Hauser	Kent State
Dec 18	Morgan Sharps	Bowling Green
Dec 25	Ally Becki	Ball State
Jan 1	Chellia Watson	Buffalo
Jan 8	Ally Becki (2)	Ball State
Jan 15	Chellia Watson (2)	Buffalo
Jan 22	Ally Becki (3)	Ball State
Jan 29	Chellia Watson (3)	Buffalo
Feb 5	Chellia Watson (4)	Buffalo
Feb 12	Chellia Watson (5)	Buffalo
Feb 19	Quinesha Lockett	Toledo
Feb 26	Amy Velasco	Bowling Green
Mar 4	Katie Shumate	Kent State
Mar 11	Alex Richard	Ball State

== Postseason ==
=== Mid–American Tournament ===
Kent State defeated Northern Illinois, Ball State, and Buffalo to win their fourth MAC tournament title and first since 2002

=== NCAA tournament ===
Kent State was seeded 15th in the Albany 1 region and fell to second-seeded Notre Dame in the first round to finish the season at 21–11.

=== Women's National Invitation Tournament ===
Buffalo and Bowling Green accepted bids and both lost in the first round

=== Postseason Awards ===
1. Coach of the Year: Tricia Cullop, Toledo
2. Player of the Year: Sophia Wiard, 5th, Guard, Toledo
3. Freshman of the Year: Kirsten Lewis-Williams, Guard, Buffalo
4. Defensive Player of the Year: Nyla Hampton, Junior, Guard, Ball State
5. Sixth Player of the Year: Annie Rauch, Senior, Forward, Ball State

=== Honors ===
Honor	Recipient
Postseason All-MAC First Team	Ally Becki, Junior, Guard, Ball State
Postseason All-MAC First Team	Chellia Watson, Redshirt Senior, Guard, Buffalo
Postseason All-MAC First Team	Katie Shumate, Redshirt Senior, Guard, Kent State
Postseason All-MAC First Team	Sophia Wiard, Fifth-Year, Guard, Toledo
Postseason All-MAC First Team	Quinesha Lockett, Fifth-Year, Guard, Toledo
Postseason All-MAC Second Team	Reagan Bass, Junior, Forward, Akron
Postseason All-MAC Second Team	Nyla Hampton, Junior, Guard, Ball State
Postseason All-MAC Second Team	Amy Velasco, Junior, Guard, Bowling Green
Postseason All-MAC Second Team	Morgan Sharps, Fifth-Year, Guard, Bowling Green
Postseason All-MAC Second Team	Kaitlyn Zarycki, Graduate, Guard, Western Michigan
Postseason All-MAC Third Team	Madelyn Bischoff, Junior, Forward, Ball State
Postseason All-MAC Third Team	Erika Porter, Senior, Forward, Bowling Green
Postseason All-MAC Third Team	Jenna Batsch, Junior, Forward, Kent State
Postseason All-MAC Third Team	Brooke Stonebraker, Senior, Forward, Northern Illinois
Postseason All-MAC Third Team	Sammi Mikonowicz, Senior, Guard/Forward, Toledo
Postseason All-MAC Honorable Mention	Kirsten Lewis-Williams, Freshman, Guard, Buffalo
Postseason All-MAC Honorable Mention	Amber Tretter, Freshman, Forward, Miami
Postseason All-MAC Honorable Mention	Taylor Williams, Redshirt Junior, Forward, Western Michigan
Postseason All-MAC Honorable Mention	Jaya McClure, Sophomore, Guard, Ohio
Postseason All-MAC Honorable Mention	Kennedi Watkins, Junior, Guard, Ohio
All-MAC Freshman Team	Kirsten Lewis-Williams, Guard, Buffalo
All-MAC Freshman Team	Paige Kohler, Guard, Bowling Green
All-MAC Freshman Team	Amber Tretter, Forward, Miami
All-MAC Freshman Team	Janae Tyler, Forward, Kent State
All-MAC Freshman Team	Bailey Tabeling, Guard, Ohio
All-MAC Defensive Team	Ally Becki, Junior, Ball State, Guard
All-MAC Defensive Team	Nyla Hampton, Junior, Guard, Ball State
All-MAC Defensive Team	Tayra Eke, Junior, Center, Eastern Michigan
All-MAC Defensive Team	Katie Shumate, Redshirt Senior, Guard, Kent State
All-MAC Defensive Team	Kaitlyn Zarycki, Graduate, Guard, Western Michigan

== See also ==
2023–24 Mid-American Conference men's basketball season
