= 2024 MAC women's basketball tournament =

- Classification: Division I
- Season: 2023–24
- Teams: 8
- Site: Rocket Mortgage FieldHouse; Cleveland, Ohio
- Champions: Kent State (4th title)
- Winning coach: Todd Starkey (1st title)
- MVP: Katie Shmuate (Kent State)
- Television: CBSSN, ESPN+
- MAC women's basketball tournaments

2023–24 Mid-American Conference women's basketball standings
	Conf.				Overall
Team	W		L	PCT	W		L	PCT
Toledo	17	–	1	.944	28	–	6	.824
Ball State	16	–	2	.889	28	–	6	.824
Kent State †	13	–	5	.722	21	–	12	.636
Buffalo	10	–	8	.556	19	–	14	.576
Bowling Green	10	–	8	.556	16	–	15	.516
Northern Illinois	8	–	10	.444	15	–	16	.484
Ohio	8	–	10	.444	11	–	19	.367
Western Michigan	7	–	11	.389	12	–	18	.400
Miami (OH)	6	–	12	.333	9	–	20	.310
Akron	6	–	12	.333	11	–	18	.379
Central Michigan	4	–	14	.222	6	–	22	.214
Eastern Michigan	3	–	15	.167	7	–	22	.241
† 2024 MAC tournament winner

The 2024 MAC women's basketball tournament was the postseason basketball tournament for the 2023–24 college basketball season in the Mid-American Conference (MAC). The entire tournament was held at Rocket Mortgage FieldHouse, in Cleveland, Ohio on March 13 and 15-16, 2024. Kent State defeated Northern Illinois, Ball State, and Buffalo to win their fourth MAC tournament title and first since 2002, and advance to the 2024 NCAA tournament. Katie Shumate was the tournament MVP.

== Format ==
As with the 2021, 2022, and 2023 tournaments, only the top eight teams qualify. The winner of the tournament will receive the MAC's automatic bid to the 2024 NCAA tournament.

== Venue ==
The 2024 MAC tournament was held at Rocket Mortgage FieldHouse for the 24th consecutive season. The venue is the home of the Cleveland Cavaliers of the NBA, has a capacity for basketball of 19,432, and is located in downtown Cleveland at One Center Court.

== Seeds ==
Eight out of the 12 MAC teams qualified for the tournament. Teams were seeded by record within the conference, with a tiebreaker system to seed teams with identical conference records.

Seed	School	Conference record	Tiebreaker
1	Toledo	17–1	
2	Ball State	16–2	
3	Kent State	13–5	
4	Buffalo	10–8	2–0 vs. Bowling Green
5	Bowling Grenn	10–8	0–2 vs. Buffalo
6	Northern Illinois	8–10	1–0 vs. Ohio
7	Ohio	8–10	0–1 vs. Northern Illinois
8	Western Michigan	7–11	
DNQ	Miami	6–12	1–0 vs. Akron
DNQ	Akron	6–12	0–1 vs. Miami
DNQ	Central Michigan	4–14	
DNQ	Eastern Michigan	3–15	

== Schedule ==
Session	Game	Time*	Matchup	Score	Attendance	Television
Quarterfinals – Wednesday, March 13 – Rocket Mortgage FieldHouse, Cleveland, OH
1	1	11:00 am	No. 1 Toledo vs. No. 8 Western Michigan	72–61	1,426	ESPN+
1	2	30 mins after Game 1	No. 4 Buffalo vs. No. 5 Bowling Green	70–64	1,426	ESPN+
1	3	30 mins after Game 2	No. 2 Ball State vs. No. 7 Ohio	77–53	1,426	ESPN+
1	4	30 mins after Game 3	No. 3 Kent State vs. No. 6 Northern Illinois	63–60	1,426	ESPN+
Semifinals – Friday, March 15 – Rocket Mortgage FieldHouse, Cleveland, OH
2	5	10:00 am	No. 1 Toledo vs. No. 4 Buffalo	74–77^{OT}		ESPN+
2	6	30 mins after Game 5	No. 2 Ball State vs. No. 3 Kent State	50–65		ESPN+
Championship – Saturday, March 16 – Rocket Mortgage FieldHouse, Cleveland, OH
3	7	11:00 am	No. 4 Buffalo vs. No. 3 Kent State	60–78	2,292	CBSSN
*Game times in ET. ()-Rankings denote tournament seeding.

== Bracket ==
Quarterfinals; Wednesday, March 13, 2024
1	Toledo	72
8	Western Michigan	61
4	Buffalo	70
5	Bowling Green	64
2	Ball State	77
7	Ohio	53
3	Kent State	63
6	Northern Illinois	60

Semifinals; Friday, March 15, 2024
1	Toledo	74
4	Buffalo	77*
2	Ball State	50
3	Kent State	65

Championship; Saturday, March 16, 2024
4	Buffalo	60
3	Kent State	78

== All-Tournament team ==
Tournament MVP – Katie Shumate

Player	Team
Quinesha Lockett	Toledo
Chellia Watson	Buffalo
Rana Elhusseini	Buffalo
Bridget Dunn	Kent State
Katie Shumate	Kent State

== See also ==
2024 MAC men's basketball tournament
