= 2023–24 Northern Illinois Huskies women's basketball team =

American college basketball season

2023–24 Northern Illinois Huskies women's basketball
- Conference: Mid-American Conference
- Record: 15–16 (8–10 MAC)
- Head coach: Lisa Carlsen (9th season)
- Associate head coach: Adam Tandez
- Assistant coaches: Jayne Hengesbach; Imani Gordon
- Home arena: Convocation Center

2023–24 Mid-American Conference women's basketball standings
	Conf.				Overall
Team	W		L	PCT	W		L	PCT
Toledo	17	–	1	.944	28	–	6	.824
Ball State	16	–	2	.889	28	–	6	.824
Kent State †	13	–	5	.722	21	–	12	.636
Buffalo	10	–	8	.556	19	–	14	.576
Bowling Green	10	–	8	.556	16	–	15	.516
Northern Illinois	8	–	10	.444	15	–	16	.484
Ohio	8	–	10	.444	11	–	19	.367
Western Michigan	7	–	11	.389	12	–	18	.400
Miami (OH)	6	–	12	.333	9	–	20	.310
Akron	6	–	12	.333	11	–	18	.379
Central Michigan	4	–	14	.222	6	–	22	.214
Eastern Michigan	3	–	15	.167	7	–	22	.241
† 2024 MAC tournament winner

The 2023–24 Northern Illinois Huskies women's basketball team represented Northern Illinois University during the 2023–24 NCAA Division I women's basketball season. The Huskies, led by ninth-year head coach Lisa Carlsen, played their home games at the Convocation Center in DeKalb, Illinois as members of the Mid-American Conference.

== Previous season ==
The Huskies finished the 2022–23 season 16–17, 8–10 in MAC play to finish in a tie for fifth place. In the MAC tournament, they were defeated by Kent State in the first round. They received an invitation into the WBI, where they were defeated by Georgia Southern in the first round, North Dakota in the consolation round, and UIC in the 7th place game.

== Roster ==
2023–24 Northern Illinois Huskies women's basketball team
Players
Coaches

Pos.	#	Name	Height	Year	Previous school	Hometown
G	2	Sidney McCrea	5 ft 10 in (1.78 m)	RS Jr	Prairie High School	Cedar Rapids, Iowa
G	3	Jayden Marable	5 ft 6 in (1.68 m)	Sr	Bolingbrook High School	Bolingbrook, Illinois
G	10	Chelby Koker	5 ft 6 in (1.68 m)	Sr	Shoreland Lutheran High School	Racine, Wisconsin
G	12	Shannon Blacher	5 ft 10 in (1.78 m)	Fr	Montini Catholic High School	Burr Ridge, Illinois
G	14	Kortney Drake	5 ft 9 in (1.75 m)	Sr	Kirkwood Community College	Wilton, Iowa
G	15	Grace Hunter	5 ft 10 in (1.78 m)	RS Sr	Bellmont High School	Monroeville, Indiana
F	21	Tara Stauffacher	5 ft 11 in (1.8 m)	Sr	Wisconsin	Columbus, Wisconsin
F	24	Maddy Fay	6 ft 1 in (1.85 m)	Fr	Fremd High School	Palatine, Illinois
F	31	Jayde Van Hyfte	6 ft 1 in (1.85 m)	GS	Arizona State	Annawan, Illinois
G	32	Laura Nickel	6 ft 0 in (1.83 m)	Jr	Marshall High School	Marshall, Wisconsin
G	33	Moriah Prewitt	5 ft 8 in (1.73 m)	Jr	Des Moines Christian School	Urbandale, Iowa
F	34	Brooke Stonebraker	6 ft 3 in (1.91 m)	Sr	Versailles High School	Versailles, Ohio
F	41	Brooke Blumenfeld	6 ft 0 in (1.83 m)	RS Fr	Glenbrook North High School	Northbrook, Illinois

Head coach

- Lisa Carlsen (Northwest Missouri State)

Assistant coach(es)

- Adam Tandez (Marquette)
- Jayne Hengesbach (Olivet Nazarene)
- Imani Gordon (Cleveland State)

Legend

- (C) Team captain
- (S) Suspended
- (I) Ineligible
- (W) Walk-on
- Injured
- Current redshirt

Roster
Last update: February 23, 2024

== Schedule and results ==
Date time, TV	Rank^{#}	Opponent^{#}	Result	Record	Site (attendance) city, state
Exhibition
November 4, 2023*; 6:00 pm		Ripon	W 104–43	–	Convocation Center (295); DeKalb, IL
Non-conference regular season
November 9, 2023*; 11:00 am, ESPN+		at Arkansas State; MAC-SBC Challenge	L 62–75	0–1	First National Bank Arena (2,685); Jonesboro, AR
November 12, 2023*; 1:00 pm, ESPN+		at Western Illinois	L 62–95	0–2	Western Hall (677); Macomb, IL
November 16, 2023*; 7:00 pm, ESPN+		at Southern Indiana	L 60–66	0–3	Screaming Eagles Arena (503); Evansville, IN
November 21, 2023*; 6:00 pm, ESPN+		Lindenwood	W 77–60	1–3	Convocation Center (486); DeKalb, IL
November 24, 2023*; 10:00 am		vs. Radford; November Clasico	W 72–55	2–3	Coliseo Rubén Rodríguez (100); Bayamón, PR
November 25, 2023*; 10:00 am		vs. Indiana State; November Clasico	W 67–62	3–3	Coliseo Rubén Rodríguez (100); Bayamón, PR
November 29, 2023*; 6:30 pm, B1G+		at Wisconsin	L 54–75	3–4	Kohl Center (2,886); Madison, WI
December 3, 2023*; 1:00 pm, ESPN+		at SIU Edwardsville	L 79–89	3–5	First Community Arena (467); Edwardsville, IL
December 10, 2023*; 1:00 pm, ESPN+		Detroit Mercy	W 75–66	4–5	Convocation Center (–); DeKalb, IL
December 18, 2023*; 5:00 pm, ESPN+		Eastern Illinois	W 65–55	5–5	Convocation Center (326); DeKalb, IL
December 30, 2023*; 1:00 pm, ESPN+		Concordia Chicago	W 98–32	6–5	Convocation Center (458); DeKalb, IL
MAC regular season
January 3, 2024; 6:00 pm, ESPN+		Eastern Michigan	L 49–67	6–6 (0–1)	Convocation Center (375); DeKalb, IL
January 6, 2024; 1:00 pm, ESPN+		Miami (OH)	W 58–48	7–6 (1–1)	Convocation Center (422); DeKalb, IL
January 10, 2024; 7:00 pm, ESPN+		at Ohio	W 67–62	8–6 (2–1)	Convocation Center (577); Athens, OH
January 14, 2024; 5:00 pm, CBSSN		at Kent State	L 48–73	8–7 (2–2)	MAC Center (838); Kent, OH
January 17, 2024; 6:00 pm, ESPN+		Buffalo	L 58–65	8–8 (2–3)	Convocation Center (445); DeKalb, IL
January 20, 2024; 1:00 pm, ESPN+		Central Michigan	W 70–57	9–8 (3–3)	Convocation Center (711); DeKalb, IL
January 24, 2024; 6:00 pm, ESPN+		at Toledo	L 52–72	9–9 (3–4)	Savage Arena (3,902); Toledo, OH
January 27, 2024; 1:00 pm, ESPN+		Akron	L 59–61	9–10 (3–5)	Convocation Center (980); DeKalb, IL
January 31, 2024; 6:00 pm, ESPN+		at Bowling Green	L 54–72	9–11 (3–6)	Stroh Center (2,420); Bowling Green, OH
February 7, 2024; 6:00 pm, ESPN+		Ball State	W 76–71 ^{OT}	10–11 (4–6)	Convocation Center (700); DeKalb, IL
February 10, 2024*; 1:00 pm, ESPN+		Georgia Southern; MAC-SBC Challenge	W 91–84	11–11	Convocation Center (846); DeKalb, IL
February 14, 2024; 11:00 am, ESPN+		Western Michigan	L 47–65	11–12 (4–7)	Convocation Center (1,958); DeKalb, IL
February 17, 2024; 12:00 pm, ESPN+		at Eastern Michigan	W 61–52	12–12 (5–7)	George Gervin GameAbove Center (1,428); Ypsilanti, MI
February 21, 2024; 5:00 pm, ESPN+		at Buffalo	W 66–57	13–12 (6–7)	Alumni Arena (1,740); Amherst, NY
February 24, 2024; 1:00 pm, ESPN+		Bowling Green	L 73–82	13–13 (6–8)	Convocation Center (1,401); DeKalb, IL
February 28, 2024; 6:00 pm, ESPN+		Toledo	L 61-74	13-14 (6-9)	Convocation Center (770); DeKalb, IL
March 2, 2024; 2:00 pm, ESPN+		at Akron	L 54-69	13-15 (6-10)	James A. Rhodes Arena (499); Akron, OH
March 6, 2024; 6:00 pm, ESPN+		at Miami (OH)	W 56-46	14-15 (7-10)	Millett Hall (434); Oxford, OH
March 9, 2024; 12:00 pm, ESPN+		at Western Michigan	W 66-64	15-15 (8-10)	University Arena; Kalamazoo, MI
MAC tournament
March 13, 2024; 5:30 pm, ESPN+	(6)	vs. (3) Kent State; Quarterfinals	L 60-63	15-16	Rocket Mortgage FieldHouse (1,426); Cleveland, OH
*Non-conference game. ^{#}Rankings from AP Poll. (#) Tournament seedings in parentheses. All times are in Central.
