= 2023–24 Eastern Michigan Eagles women's basketball team =

American college basketball season

2023–24 Eastern Michigan Eagles women's basketball
- Conference: Mid-American Conference
- Record: 6–19 (2–12 MAC)
- Head coach: Ke'Sha Blanton (interim)
- Assistant coaches: Katie Hempen; Amy Pryor
- Home arena: George Gervin GameAbove Center

2023–24 Mid-American Conference women's basketball standings
	Conf.				Overall
Team	W		L	PCT	W		L	PCT
Toledo	17	–	1	.944	28	–	6	.824
Ball State	16	–	2	.889	28	–	6	.824
Kent State †	13	–	5	.722	21	–	12	.636
Buffalo	10	–	8	.556	19	–	14	.576
Bowling Green	10	–	8	.556	16	–	15	.516
Northern Illinois	8	–	10	.444	15	–	16	.484
Ohio	8	–	10	.444	11	–	19	.367
Western Michigan	7	–	11	.389	12	–	18	.400
Miami (OH)	6	–	12	.333	9	–	20	.310
Akron	6	–	12	.333	11	–	18	.379
Central Michigan	4	–	14	.222	6	–	22	.214
Eastern Michigan	3	–	15	.167	7	–	22	.241
† 2024 MAC tournament winner

The 2023–24 Eastern Michigan Eagles women's basketball team represented Eastern Michigan University during the 2023–24 NCAA Division I women's basketball season. The Eagles, led by interim head coach Ke'Sha Blanton, who replaced Fred Castro midseason, played their home games at the George Gervin GameAbove Center in Ypsilanti, Michigan as members of the Mid-American Conference (MAC). They finished the season 7–22, 3–15 in MAC play, to finish in twelfth (last) place. They failed to qualify for the MAC tournament, as only the top eight teams qualify.

During the season, on December 11, 2023, the school announced that they would be firing head coach Fred Castro, ending his eighth season with the team, with assistant coach Ke'Sha Blanton being named the interim head coach for the remainder of the season. On March 28, 2024, the school announced that they would be hiring Canisius head coach Sahar Nusseibeh as the team's next head coach.

== Previous season ==
The Eagles finished the 2022–23 season 15–15, 7–11 in MAC play, to finish in a four-way tie for seventh place. In the MAC tournament, they were defeated by Bowling Green in the quarterfinals.

== Roster ==
2023–24 Eastern Michigan Eagles women's basketball team
Players
Coaches

Pos.	#	Name	Height	Year	Previous school	Hometown
G	00	Olivia Westphal	5 ft 9 in (1.75 m)	Jr	Duquesne	Bethel Park, PA
G	1	Olivia Smith	5 ft 5 in (1.65 m)	So	South Side High School	Fort Wayne, IN
G	2	Nia Boston	5 ft 6 in (1.68 m)	Jr	Mesa Community College	Stockton, CA
G	10	ZaNiya Nelson	5 ft 11 in (1.8 m)	Jr	Putnam City West High School	Oklahoma City, OK
G	11	Lachelle Austin	5 ft 7 in (1.7 m)	Jr	Wayne Memorial High School	Redford, MI
G	12	Dara Capaldi	5 ft 9 in (1.75 m)	So	La Lumiere School	East Detroit, MI
G	13	Elena Cabello	6 ft 0 in (1.83 m)	So	IES Mediterraneo	Málaga, Spain
G	14	Sophie Canen	5 ft 9 in (1.75 m)	Fr	Hope College	Saline, MI
G	20	Ashley Hassett	5 ft 10 in (1.78 m)	Sr	Northeast Community College	Hershey, NE
G	21	Meghan Gentile	5 ft 9 in (1.75 m)	Fr	Immaculate Conception High School	Roseland, NJ
G	22	Cali Denson	5 ft 8 in (1.73 m)	Fr	Milwaukie Academy of the Arts	Milwaukie, OR
G	23	Kyndal Lewis	5 ft 8 in (1.73 m)	Jr	Belton High School	Belton, MO
F	24	Treasure Thompson	6 ft 2 in (1.88 m)	Jr	LSU	Joliet, IL
C	32	Tayra Eke	6 ft 3 in (1.91 m)	Jr	LIU	Madrid, Spain
F	44	Kennedi Myles	6 ft 2 in (1.88 m)	Sr	Marquette	Cincinnati, OH

Head coach

- Ke'Sha Blanton (interim) (Toledo)

Assistant coach(es)

- Katie Hempen (Arizona State)
- Amy Pryor (Oklahoma Baptist)

Legend

- (C) Team captain
- (S) Suspended
- (I) Ineligible
- (W) Walk-on
- Injured
- Current redshirt

Roster
Last update: February 26, 2024

== Schedule and results ==
Date time, TV	Rank^{#}	Opponent^{#}	Result	Record	Site (attendance) city, state
Non-conference regular season
November 6, 2023*; 7:00 p.m., ESPN+		Detroit Mercy	L 38–68	0–1	George Gervin GameAbove Center (1,426); Ypsilanti, MI
November 11, 2023*; 2:00 p.m., ESPN+		at Georgia Southern; MAC/Sun Belt Challenge	L 58–82	0–2	Hanner Fieldhouse (511); Statesboro, GA
November 18, 2023*; 3:30 p.m., ESPN+		SIU Edwardsville	W 68–65	1–2	George Gervin GameAbove Center (2,985); Ypsilanti, MI
November 24, 2023*; 1:00 p.m., B1G+		at Michigan	L 44–80	1–3	Crisler Center (4,052); Ann Arbor, MI
December 1, 2023*; 8:00 p.m., SLN		at North Dakota State	L 73–93	1–4	Scheels Center (613); Fargo, ND
December 3, 2023*; 2:00 p.m., SLN		at North Dakota	L 56–64	1–5	Betty Engelstad Sioux Center (1,349); Grand Forks, ND
December 7, 2023*; 7:00 p.m., ESPN+		at Lindenwood	L 64–71	1–6	Hyland Performance Arena (317); St. Charles, MO
December 9, 2023*; 2:00 p.m., ESPN+		at Southern Indiana	L 51–72	1–7	Screaming Eagles Arena (513); Evansville, IN
December 15, 2023*; 7:00 p.m., ESPN+		at IUPUI	W 84–74 ^{OT}	2–7	IUPUI Gymnasium (414); Indianapolis, IN
December 29, 2023*; 2:00 p.m., ESPN+		Saginaw Valley State	W 69–44	3–7	George Gervin GameAbove Center (1,382); Ypsilanti, MI
MAC regular season
January 3, 2024; 7:00 p.m., ESPN+		at Northern Illinois	W 67–49	4–7 (1–0)	Convocation Center (375); DeKalb, IL
January 6, 2024; 1:00 p.m., ESPN+		Toledo	L 35–48	4–8 (1–1)	George Gervin GameAbove Center (622); Ypsilanti, MI
January 10, 2024; 7:00 p.m., ESPN+		at Bowling Green	L 57–69	4–9 (1–2)	Stroh Center (1,897); Bowling Green, OH
January 13, 2024; 1:00 p.m., ESPN+		Central Michigan	L 60–64	4–10 (1–3)	George Gervin GameAbove Center (1,392); Ypsilanti, MI
January 17, 2024; 7:00 p.m., ESPN+		Miami (OH)	W 53–48	5–10 (2–3)	George Gervin GameAbove Center (1,311); Ypsilanti, MI
January 20, 2024; 1:00 p.m., ESPN+		at Ohio	L 62–72	5–11 (2–4)	Convocation Center (–); Athens, OH
January 24, 2024; 7:00 p.m., ESPN+		at Kent State	L 57–66	5–12 (2–5)	MAC Center (754); Kent, OH
January 27, 2024; 1:00 p.m., ESPN+		Ball State	L 50–75	5–13 (2–6)	George Gervin GameAbove Center (1,495); Ypsilanti, MI
January 31, 2024; 7:00 p.m., ESPN+		Western Michigan	L 49–76	5–14 (2–7)	George Gervin GameAbove Center (1,358); Ypsilanti, MI
February 3, 2024; 6:00 p.m., ESPN+		at Buffalo	L 63–75	5–15 (2–8)	Alumni Arena (1,880); Amherst, NY
February 7, 2024; 7:00 p.m., ESPN+		Akron	L 67–68 ^{OT}	5–16 (2–9)	George Gervin GameAbove Center (1,431); Ypsilanti, MI
February 10, 2024*; 1:00 p.m., ESPN+		South Alabama; MAC/Sun Belt Challenge	W 81–69	6–16	George Gervin GameAbove Center (1,318); Ypsilanti, MI
February 17, 2024; 1:00 p.m., ESPN+		Northern Illinois	L 52–61	6–17 (2–10)	George Gervin GameAbove Center (1,428); Ypsilanti, MI
February 21, 2024; 7:00 p.m., ESPN+		at Western Michigan	L 55–65	6–18 (2–11)	University Arena (797); Kalamazoo, MI
February 24, 2024; 1:00 p.m., ESPN+		at Miami (OH)	L 37–48	6–19 (2–12)	Millett Hall (1,529); Oxford, OH
February 28, 2024; 7:00 p.m., ESPN+		Kent State	L 64–76	6–20 (2–13)	George Gervin GameAbove Center (1,440); Ypsilanti, MI
March 2, 2024; 1:00 p.m., ESPN+		at Ball State	L 47–75	6–21 (2–14)	Worthen Arena (2,154); Muncie, IN
March 6, 2024; 7:00 p.m., ESPN+		at Toledo	L 41–87	6–22 (2–15)	Savage Arena (4,877); Toledo, OH
March 9, 2024; 1:00 p.m., ESPN+		Bowling Green	W 59–54	7–22 (3–15)	George Gervin GameAbove Center (1,476); Ypsilanti, MI
*Non-conference game. ^{#}Rankings from AP poll. (#) Tournament seedings in parentheses. All times are in Eastern.
