= 2023–24 Miami RedHawks women's basketball team =

American college basketball season

2023–24 Miami RedHawks women's basketball
- Conference: Mid-American Conference
- Record: 9–20 (6–12 MAC)
- Head coach: Glenn Box (1st season)
- Associate head coach: Ben Wierzba
- Assistant coaches: Evelyn Thompson; Keyanna Warthen; Megan Belke
- Home arena: Millett Hall

2023–24 Mid-American Conference women's basketball standings
	Conf.				Overall
Team	W		L	PCT	W		L	PCT
Toledo	17	–	1	.944	28	–	6	.824
Ball State	16	–	2	.889	28	–	6	.824
Kent State †	13	–	5	.722	21	–	12	.636
Buffalo	10	–	8	.556	19	–	14	.576
Bowling Green	10	–	8	.556	16	–	15	.516
Northern Illinois	8	–	10	.444	15	–	16	.484
Ohio	8	–	10	.444	11	–	19	.367
Western Michigan	7	–	11	.389	12	–	18	.400
Miami (OH)	6	–	12	.333	9	–	20	.310
Akron	6	–	12	.333	11	–	18	.379
Central Michigan	4	–	14	.222	6	–	22	.214
Eastern Michigan	3	–	15	.167	7	–	22	.241
† 2024 MAC tournament winner

The 2023–24 Miami RedHawks women's basketball team represented Miami University during the 2023–24 NCAA Division I women's basketball season. The RedHawks, led by first-year head coach Glenn Box, played their home games at Millett Hall in Oxford, Ohio as members of the Mid-American Conference (MAC).

The RedHawks finished the season 8–17, 5–9 in MAC play, to finish in a tie for ninth place. They failed to qualify for the MAC tournament, as only the top eight teams qualify.

== Previous season ==
The RedHawks finished the 2022–23 season 12–19, 7–11 in MAC play, to finish in a four-way tie for seventh place. Due to tiebreakers, they failed to qualify for the MAC tournament, as only the top eight teams qualify.

On April 26, 2023, it was announced that head coach DeUnna Hendrix would be resigning, after four years at the helm. On May 8, it was announced that Indiana associate head coach Glenn Box would become the RedHawks' next head coach.

== Roster ==
2023–24 Miami RedHawks women's basketball team
Players
Coaches

Pos.	#	Name	Height	Year	Previous school	Hometown
G	0	Clare Chambers	5 ft 8 in (1.73 m)	Jr	Magnificat High School	Westlake, OH
G	1	Jordan Tuff	5 ft 8 in (1.73 m)	GS	Cincinnati	Kernersville, NC
G	2	Hennessey Luu-Brown	5 ft 7 in (1.7 m)	Sr	New Orleans	Toronto, ON
F	3	Jessie Dai	6 ft 1 in (1.85 m)	Jr	Odessa College	Daqing, China
G	4	Lakresha Edwards	6 ft 0 in (1.83 m)	Fr	Fort Erie International Academy	Chilliwack, BC
F	10	Jadyn Scott	6 ft 2 in (1.88 m)	GS	Cincinnati	Townsend, GA
F	12	Jada Scott	6 ft 1 in (1.85 m)	GS	Cincinnati	Townsend, GA
F	15	Amber Tretter	6 ft 1 in (1.85 m)	Fr	Forest Park High School	Ferdinand, IN
G	16	Jessie Gauna	5 ft 4 in (1.63 m)	Fr	Archie Williams High School	San Anselmo, CA
G	17	Núria Jurjo	5 ft 10 in (1.78 m)	Fr	Institut Montserrat Roig	Barcelona, Spain
G	22	Cori Lard	5 ft 9 in (1.75 m)	Jr	Barton Community College	Davenport, IA
F	23	Riley Neal	5 ft 11 in (1.8 m)	So	North Oldham High School	Prospect, KY
G	24	Maddy Huhn	5 ft 8 in (1.73 m)	Fr	Carlsbad High School	Carlsbad, CA
F	32	Katey Richason	6 ft 1 in (1.85 m)	Jr	Zionsville High School	Zionsville, IN

Head coach

- Glenn Box (Southeast Missouri State)

Assistant coach(es)

- Ben Wierzba (SIU Edwardsville)
- Evelyn Thompson (Auburn)
- Keyanna Warthen (SMU)
- Megan Belke (Grand Valley State)

Legend

- (C) Team captain
- (S) Suspended
- (I) Ineligible
- (W) Walk-on
- Injured
- Current redshirt

Roster
Last update: February 24, 2024

== Schedule and results ==
Date time, TV	Rank^{#}	Opponent^{#}	Result	Record	High points	High rebounds	High assists	Site (attendance) city, state
Non-conference regular season
November 6, 2023*; 5:00 p.m., ESPN+		at Vermont	L 48–60	0–1	11 – Scott	6 – Scott	2 – Scott	Patrick Gym (566); Burlington, VT
November 11, 2023*; 8:00 p.m., ESPN+		at Louisiana–Monroe; MAC–SBC Challenge	L 62–78	0–2	23 – Scott	9 – Scott	5 – Luu-Brown	Fant–Ewing Coliseum (909); Monroe, LA
November 18, 2023*; 1:00 p.m., ESPN+		Western Kentucky	L 43–63	0–3	14 – Scott	7 – Scott	3 – Huhn	Millett Hall (357); Oxford, OH
November 27, 2023*; 7:00 p.m., ESPN+		Xavier	W 58–57 ^{OT}	1–3	16 – Scott	11 – Richason	5 – Lard	Millett Hall (344); Oxford, OH
December 3, 2023*; 2:00 p.m., B1G+		at Michigan State	L 44–89 ^{OT}	1–4	9 – Jurjo	8 – Tretter	4 – Jurjo	Breslin Center (2,861); East Lansing, MI
December 6, 2023*; 12:00 p.m., ESPN+		at Eastern Kentucky	L 55–85	1–5	20 – Scott	5 – Scott	5 – Jurjo	Baptist Health Arena (2,136); Richmond, KY
December 9, 2023*; 1:00 p.m., ESPN+		Dayton	L 60–73	1–6	14 – Jurjo	5 – Jurjo	4 – Tretter	Millett Hall (443); Oxford, OH
December 16, 2023*; 11:00 a.m., B1G+		at Michigan	L 49–75	1–7	11 – Scott	7 – Tretter	4 – Edwards	Crisler Center (3,065); Ann Arbor, MI
December 21, 2023*; 7:00 p.m., ESPN+		at Oakland	W 68–66 ^{OT}	2–7	19 – Tretter	13 – Tretter	6 – Tretter	OU Credit Union O'rena (612); Rochester, MI
December 30, 2023*; 3:00 p.m., ESPN+		at Austin Peay	L 44–53	2–8	13 – Edwards	7 – Tretter	4 – Huhn	F&M Bank Arena (1,519); Clarksville, TN
MAC regular season
January 3, 2024; 7:00 p.m., ESPN+		Toledo	L 52–70	2–9 (0–1)	13 – Scott	7 – Richason	6 – Jurjo	Millett Hall (247); Oxford, OH
January 6, 2024; 2:00 p.m., ESPN+		at Northern Illinois	L 48–58	2–10 (0–2)	14 – Tretter	9 – Tretter	2 – Lard	Convocation Center (422); DeKalb, IL
January 10, 2024; 7:00 p.m., ESPN+		Kent State	L 38–69	2–11 (0–3)	10 – Scott	7 – Tretter	4 – Jurjo	Millett Hall (289); Oxford, OH
January 13, 2024; 3:00 p.m., ESPN+		at Western Michigan	W 64–50	3–11 (1–3)	15 – Richason	13 – Richason	4 – Lard	University Arena (775); Kalamazoo, MI
January 17, 2024; 7:00 p.m., ESPN+		at Eastern Michigan	L 48–53	3–12 (1–4)	11 – Scott	9 – Richason	3 – Richason	George Gervin GameAbove Center (1,311); Ypsilanti, MI
January 20, 2024; 1:00 p.m., ESPN+		Bowling Green	W 56–47	4–12 (2–4)	12 – Lard	11 – Tretter	3 – Lard	Millett Hall (385); Oxford, OH
January 24, 2024; 6:30 p.m., ESPN+		at Ball State	L 56–91	4–13 (2–5)	10 – Neal	5 – Tretter	4 – Lard	Worthen Arena (1,569); Muncie, IN
January 27, 2024; 1:00 p.m., ESPN+		at Ohio	L 55–71	4–14 (2–6)	19 – Tretter	12 – Tretter	6 – Lard	Convocation Center (741); Athens, OH
January 31, 2024; 7:00 p.m., ESPN+		Central Michigan	L 59–64	4–15 (2–7)	27 – Tretter	16 – Tretter	3 – Lard	Millett Hall (361); Oxford, OH
February 3, 2024; 2:00 p.m., ESPN+		at Akron	W 58–48	5–15 (3–7)	18 – Tretter	11 – Scott	5 – Lard	James A. Rhodes Arena (847); Akron, OH
February 7, 2024; 7:00 p.m., ESPN+		Buffalo	L 43–49	5–16 (3–8)	10 – Tretter	11 – Tretter	4 – Lard	Millett Hall (510); Oxford, OH
February 10, 2024*; 1:00 p.m., ESPN+		Georgia State; MAC–SBC Challenge	W 80–63	6–16	27 – Scott	12 – Tretter	8 – Lard	Millett Hall (346); Oxford, OH
February 17, 2024; 1:00 p.m., ESPN+		Western Michigan	W 58–50	7–16 (4–8)	20 – Scott	17 – Tretter	4 – Lard	Millett Hall (1,472); Oxford, OH
February 21, 2024; 7:00 p.m., ESPN+		at Toledo	L 36–68	7–17 (4–9)	11 – Lard	10 – Jurjo	2 – Luu-Brown	Savage Arena (3,651); Toledo, OH
February 24, 2024; 1:00 p.m., ESPN+		Eastern Michigan	W 48–37	8–17 (5–9)	14 – Ricason	9 – Tretter	6 – Lard	Millett Hall (1,529); Oxford, OH
February 28, 2024; 7:00 p.m., ESPN+		at Central Michigan	L 73–76 ^{2OT}	8–18 (5–10)	21 – Richason	12 – Tretter	4 – Lard	McGuirk Arena (1,095); Mount Pleasant, MI
March 2, 2024; 2:00 p.m., ESPN+		at Bowling Green	L 47–66	8–19 (5–11)	17 – Lard	7 – Lard	5 – Lard	Stroh Center (1,996); Bowling Green, OH
March 6, 2024; 7:00 p.m., ESPN+		Northern Illinois	L 46–56	8–20 (5–12)	16 – Tretter	8 – Richason	4 – Lard	Millett Hall (434); Oxford, OH
March 9, 2024; 1:00 p.m., ESPN+		Ohio	W 68–64	9–20 (6–12)	20 – Luu-Brown	11 – Tretter	3 – Luu-Brown	Millett Hall (649); Oxford, OH
*Non-conference game. ^{#}Rankings from AP poll. (#) Tournament seedings in parentheses. All times are in Eastern.
