= 2023–24 Ball State Cardinals women's basketball team =

Intercollegiate basketball season

2023–24 Ball State Cardinals women's basketball

Sun Coast Challenge Champion

WBIT, First Round
- Conference: Mid-American Conference
- Record: 28–6 (16–2 MAC)
- Head coach: Brady Sallee (12th season)
- Assistant coaches: Audrey Spencer; Moriah Monaco; Casey Morrissette; Mariah King
- Home arena: Worthen Arena

2023–24 Mid-American Conference women's basketball standings
	Conf.				Overall
Team	W		L	PCT	W		L	PCT
Toledo	17	–	1	.944	28	–	6	.824
Ball State	16	–	2	.889	28	–	6	.824
Kent State †	13	–	5	.722	21	–	12	.636
Buffalo	10	–	8	.556	19	–	14	.576
Bowling Green	10	–	8	.556	16	–	15	.516
Northern Illinois	8	–	10	.444	15	–	16	.484
Ohio	8	–	10	.444	11	–	19	.367
Western Michigan	7	–	11	.389	12	–	18	.400
Miami (OH)	6	–	12	.333	9	–	20	.310
Akron	6	–	12	.333	11	–	18	.379
Central Michigan	4	–	14	.222	6	–	22	.214
Eastern Michigan	3	–	15	.167	7	–	22	.241
† 2024 MAC tournament winner

The 2023–24 Ball State Cardinals women's basketball team represented Ball State University during the 2023–24 NCAA Division I women's basketball season. The Cardinals, led by 12th-year head coach Brady Sallee, played their home games at the Worthen Arena in Muncie, Indiana as a member of the Mid-American Conference.

== Previous season ==
The Cardinals finished 28–6 and 16–2 in the MAC play to finish second in the MAC. They lost in the semi-final of the MAC tournament. The Cardinals were selected to play in the 2024 WBIT. The team fell to Belmont in the second round.

== Preseason ==
Prior to the season Ball State was picked second in the MAC preseason poll.

=== Preseason rankings ===
MAC preseason poll
Predicted finish	Team	Votes (1st place)
1	Toledo	121 (11)
2	Ball State	110 (1)
3	Kent State	102
4	Bowling Green	77
5	Northern Illinois	99
6	Akron	69
7	Eastern Michigan	66
8	Buffalo	50
9	Ohio	40
10	Western Michigan	38
11	Central Michigan	24
12	Miami	23

MAC Tournament Champion: Toledo (10), Ball State (2)

== Roster ==
2023–24 Ball State Cardinals women's basketball team
Players
Coaches

Pos.	#	Name	Height	Year	Previous school	Hometown
G	0	Ally Becki	5 ft 8 in (1.73 m)	Jr	Brownsburg	Brownsburg, IN
G	1	Hana Mühl	5 ft 8 in (1.73 m)	So	-	HR
G	3	Sydney Bolden	5 ft 8 in (1.73 m)	So	Loganville	Loganville, GA
F	4	Sydney Shafer	5 ft 8 in (1.73 m)	Sr	Northwest	Jackson, MI
G	10	Ana Barreto	5 ft 9 in (1.75 m)	So	-	Portugal, EU
G	12	Nyla Hampton	5 ft 7 in (1.7 m)	Jr	Wayne	Huber Heights, OH
F	14	Marie Kiefer	6 ft 2 in (1.88 m)	Jr	Bishop Brossart	Alexandria, KY
G	15	Ashlynn Brooke	5 ft 6 in (1.68 m)	Fr	Pioneer	Royal Center, IN
F	20	Alex Richard	6 ft 1 in (1.85 m)	Jr	Avon	Avon, IN
G	22	Estel Puiggros	5 ft 9 in (1.75 m)	Sr	CLUB SEGEL XXI	Manresa, ES
G	24	Madelyn Bischoff	5 ft 9 in (1.75 m)	Jr	Roncalli	Indianapolis, IN
F	30	Hailey Smith	5 ft 10 in (1.78 m)	Fr	Fishers	Fishers, IN
F	31	Olivia Smith	5 ft 10 in (1.78 m)	Fr	Fishers	Fishers, IN
F	42	Annie Rauch	6 ft 3 in (1.91 m)	Sr	Hilliard Darby	Hilliard, OH

Head coach

- Brady Sallee (Thomas More)

Assistant coach(es)

- Audrey Spencer (Ball State)
- Moriah Monaco (Ball State)
- Casey Morrissette (Mount Union)
- Mariah King (Eastern Illinois)

Legend

- (C) Team captain
- (S) Suspended
- (I) Ineligible
- (W) Walk-on
- Injured
- Current redshirt

Roster
Last update: January 28, 2024

=== Support staff ===
2023-24 Ball State Cardinals support staff
- Ben Armer - director of strength and conditioning
- Brad Bunten - assistant athletic trainer
- Caroline Scheu - content creator
- Gabby Beckham - graduate assistant
- Tyler Young - graduate assistant

== Schedule ==
Date time, TV	Rank^{#}	Opponent^{#}	Result	Record	High points	High rebounds	High assists	Site (attendance) city, state
Exhibition
November 1, 2023*; 6:30 p.m.		Trine University	W 100-41	–	–	–	–	Worthen Arena; Muncie, IN
Non-conference regular season
November 6, 2023*; 11:00 a.m.		Tennessee Tech	W 97-64	1–0	18 – Richard	7 – Barreto	7 – Becki	Worthen Arena (4,212); Muncie, IN
November 11, 2023*; 3:30 p.m.		at Troy; MAC-SBC Challenge	W 86–71	2–0	22 – Bischoff	9 – Kiefer	7 – Tied	Trojan Arena (2,126); Troy, AL
November 14, 2023*; 6:00 p.m.		at Chicago State	W 85–56	3–0	18 – Rauch	9 – Puiggros	8 – Becki	Jones Convocation Center (N/A); Chicago, IL
November 18, 2023*; 11:00 a.m.		Northern Iowa	W 75–64	4–0	19 – Hampton	6 – Kiefer	5 – Becki	Worthen Arena (1,432); Muncie, IN
November 22, 2023*; 2:00 p.m., ESPN+		at IUPUI	W 67–63	5–0	19 – Becki	10 – Kiefer	6 – Becki	Indiana Farmers Coliseum (490); Indianapolis, IN
November 24, 2023*; 5:00 p.m., ACCNX		No. 17 Notre Dame	L 59–90	5–1	11 – Tied	5 – Richard	4 – Hampton	Worthen Arena (5,442); Muncie, IN
December 3, 2023*; 12:00 p.m., ESPN+		at Saint Louis	W 71–64	6–1	17 – Richard	8 – Becki	5 – Hampton	Chaifetz Arena (812); St. Louis, MO
December 6, 2023*; 4:00 p.m., SNY, ESPN+		at No. 17 UConn	L 63–90	6–2	12 – Bischoff	3 – Tied	3 – Richard	Harry A. Gampel Pavilion (9,273); Storrs, CT
December 10, 2023*; 3:00 p.m.		at Western Kentucky	W 67–59	7–2	16 – Becki	9 – Richard	9 – Hampton	E.A. Diddle Arena (1,008); Bowling Green, KY
December 19, 2023*; 12:00 p.m., Baller.tv		vs. No. 16 Pittsburgh; Sun Coast Tournament	W 73–62	8–2	18 – Bischoff	10 – Kiefer	6 – Becki	Pasco–Hernando State College (108); Tampa, FL
December 21, 2023*; 12:00 p.m., Baller.tv		vs. No. 16 Georgia; Sun Coast Tournament	W 52–51	9–2	16 – Becki	6 – Tied	6 – Becki	Pasco–Hernando State College (123); Tampa, FL
December 30, 2023*; 3:00 p.m.		Oakland City	W 95-58	10–2	16 – Bischoff	7 – Rauch	8 – Tied	Worthen Arena (1,564); Muncie, IN
MAC regular season
January 3, 2024; 7:00 p.m.		at Western Michigan	W 78–56	11–2 (1–0)	15 – Becki	8 – Richard	7 – Becki	University Arena (868); Kalamazoo, MI
January 6, 2024; 2:00 p.m.		at Akron	W 71–64	12–2 (2–0)	20 – Becki	10 – Rauch	6 – Becki	James A. Rhodes Arena (802); Akron, OH
January 10, 2024; 6:30 p.m.		Buffalo	W 67–62	13–2 (3–0)	16 – Hampton	10 – Becki	7 – Becki	Worthen (1,594); Muncie, IN
January 13, 2024; 1:00 p.m.		Bowling Green	W 76–61	14–2 (4–0)	18 – Bischoff	7 – Bischoff	6 – Hampton	Worthen Arena (1,068); Muncie, IN
January 17, 2024; 11:00 a.m.		at Central Michigan	W 79–47	15–2 (5–0)	36 – Becki	7 – Richard	10 – Hampton	McGuirk Arena (3,271); Mount Pleasant, MI
January 21, 2024; 6:00 p.m.		Toledo	W 65–51	16–2 (6–0)	19 – Bischoff	5 – Tied	3 – Tied	Worthen Arena (2,469); Muncie, IN
January 24, 2024; 6:30 p.m.		Miami (OH)	W 91–56	17–2 (7–0)	14 – Tied	5 – Smith	5 – Hampton	Worthen Arena (1,569); Muncie, IN
January 27, 2024; 1:00 p.m.		at Eastern Michigan	W 75–50	18–2 (8–0)	21 – Becki	9 – Kiefer	7 – Becki	Convocation Center (1,495); Ypsilanti, MI
January 31, 2024; 6:30 p.m.		Kent State	W 57–46	19–2 (9–0)	16 – Becki	7 – Tied	6 – Hampton	Worthen Arena (1,073); Muncie, IN
February 3, 2024; 1:00 p.m.		Ohio	W 97–66	20–2 (10–0)	18 – Puiggros	6 – Tied	8 – Hampton	Worthen Arena (1,556); Muncie, IN
February 7, 2024; 7:00 p.m.		at Northern Illinois	L 71–76 ^{OT}	20–3 (10–1)	14 – Bischoff	5 – Tied	6 – Becki	Convocation Center (700); DeKalb, IL
February 11, 2024*; 2:00 p.m., CBSSN		James Madison; MAC-SBC Challenge	W 72–57	21–3	19 – Kiefer	9 – Richard	5 – Becki	Worthen Arena (1,575); Muncie, IN
February 17, 2024; 1:00 p.m.		at Ohio	W 75–60	22–3 (11–1)	17 – Bischoff	11 – Hampton	5 – Becki	Convocation Center (880); Athens, OH
February 21, 2024; 6:30 p.m.		Central Michigan	W 78–54	23–3 (12–1)	22 – Richard	8 – Kiefer	5 – Hampton	Worthen Arena (1,343); Muncie, IN
February 24, 2024; 2:00 p.m.		at Toledo	L 48–70	23–4 (12–2)	12 – Richard	6 – Richard	4 – Becki	Savage Arena (5,556); Toledo, OH
February 28, 2024; 6:30 p.m.		Akron	W 75–41	24–4 (13–2)	21 – Richard	6 – Tied	4 – Hampton	Worthen Arena (1,167); Muncie, IN
March 2, 2024; 11:00 a.m.		Eastern Michigan	W 75–47	25–4 (14–2)	18 – Hampton	4 – Tied	4 – Hampton	Worthen Arena (2,154); Muncie, IN
March 6, 2024; 5:00 p.m.		at Kent State	W 75–71	26–4 (15–2)	17 – Richard	11 – Kiefer	6 – Hampton	MAC Center (1,290); Kent, OH
March 9, 2024; 2:00 p.m.		at Buffalo	W 71–50	27–4 (16–2)	18 – Richard	7 – Tied	10 – Becki	Convocation Center (2,371); Amherst, NY
MAC tournament
March 13, 2024; 4:00 p.m., ESPN+	(2)	vs. (7) Ohio; Quarterfinals	W 77–53	28–4	22 – Richard	11 – Kiefer	7 – Hampton	Rocket Mortgage FieldHouse (1,426); Cleveland, OH
March 15, 2024; 1:00 p.m., ESPN+	(2)	vs. (3) Kent State; Semifinals	L 50–65	28–5	13 – Becki	6 – Richard	7 – Becki	Rocket Mortgage FieldHouse; Cleveland, OH
WBIT
March 21, 2024*; 4:00 p.m., ESPN+	(4)	Belmont; First Round	L 59–77	28–6	14 – Hampton	8 – Kiefer	4 – Becki	Worthen Arena (719); Muncie, IN
*Non-conference game. ^{#}Rankings from AP Poll. (#) Tournament seedings in parentheses. All times are in Eastern Time.
