= 2023–24 Kent State Golden Flashes women's basketball team =

American college basketball season

2023–24 Kent State Golden Flashes women's basketball

MAC tournament champions

NCAA tournament, first round
- Conference: Mid-American Conference
- Record: 21–12 (13–5 MAC)
- Head coach: Todd Starkey (8th season)
- Associate head coach: Fran Recchia
- Assistant coaches: Alexa Golden; Paige Salisbury
- Home arena: MAC Center

2023–24 Mid-American Conference women's basketball standings
	Conf.				Overall
Team	W		L	PCT	W		L	PCT
Toledo	17	–	1	.944	28	–	6	.824
Ball State	16	–	2	.889	28	–	6	.824
Kent State †	13	–	5	.722	21	–	12	.636
Buffalo	10	–	8	.556	19	–	14	.576
Bowling Green	10	–	8	.556	16	–	15	.516
Northern Illinois	8	–	10	.444	15	–	16	.484
Ohio	8	–	10	.444	11	–	19	.367
Western Michigan	7	–	11	.389	12	–	18	.400
Miami (OH)	6	–	12	.333	9	–	20	.310
Akron	6	–	12	.333	11	–	18	.379
Central Michigan	4	–	14	.222	6	–	22	.214
Eastern Michigan	3	–	15	.167	7	–	22	.241
† 2024 MAC tournament winner

The 2023–24 Kent State Golden Flashes women's basketball team represented Kent State University during the 2023–24 NCAA Division I women's basketball season. The Golden Flashes, led by eighth-year head coach Todd Starkey, played their home games at the MAC Center in Kent, Ohio, as members of the Mid-American Conference (MAC). The team finished the regular season at 18–10 and finished third in the Mid-American Conference with a 13–5 record in conference play. In the 2024 MAC women's basketball tournament, the Golden Flashes defeated Northern Illinois, Ball State and Buffalo to win their fourth MAC tournament title and first since 2002, and advance to the 2024 NCAA tournament. In the NCAA tournament, the Golden Flashes were seeded 15th in the Albany 1 region and fell to second-seeded Notre Dame in the first round to finish the season at 21–11.

== Previous season ==
The Golden Flashes finished the 2022–23 season 21–11, 12–6 in MAC play, to finish in fourth place. In the MAC tournament, they defeated Northern Illinois in the quarterfinals, before falling to top-seeded and eventual tournament champions Toledo in the semifinals. They received an at-large bid into the WNIT, where they lost to Syracuse in the first round.

== Roster ==
2023–24 Kent State Golden Flashes women's basketball team
Players
Coaches

Pos.	#	Name	Height	Year	Previous school	Hometown
G	0	Kaley Perkins	6 ft 0 in (1.83 m)	RS So	Oklahoma	Houston, TX
F	1	Tatiana Thomas	5 ft 10 in (1.78 m)	So	Bolingbrook High School	Bolingbrook, IL
G	3	Corynne Hauser	5 ft 7 in (1.7 m)	So	Rochester High School	Rochester, PA
F	5	Bianca Juzzo	5 ft 11 in (1.8 m)	Jr	New Mexico Junior College	Ribeirão Preto, Brazil
G	10	Eléna Maier	5 ft 9 in (1.75 m)	RS So	Waunakee High School	Waunakee, WI
G	11	Lexy Linton	5 ft 8 in (1.73 m)	Jr	Jackson Memorial High School	Westampton, NJ
F	12	Jenna Batsch	6 ft 1 in (1.85 m)	Jr	Loveland High School	Loveland, OH
G	14	Katie Shumate	6 ft 0 in (1.83 m)	RS Sr	Newark High School	Newark, OH
F	15	Bridget Dunn	6 ft 3 in (1.91 m)	Jr	Carmel High School	Carmel, IN
G	21	Dionna Gray	5 ft 4 in (1.63 m)	So	Huntington High School	Huntington, WV
G	22	Abby Ogle	5 ft 8 in (1.73 m)	GS	West Virginia	Baldwin City, KS
G	23	Mya Babbitt	5 ft 8 in (1.73 m)	Fr	Millard South High School	Papillion, NE
C	30	Mikala Morris	6 ft 2 in (1.88 m)	GS	Quinnipiac	Springfield, OH
F	34	Janae Tyler	6 ft 1 in (1.85 m)	Fr	Holt High School	Lansing, MI

Head coach

- Todd Starkey (Montreat)

Assistant coach(es)

- Fran Recchia (Virginia Tech)
- Alexa Golden (Kent State)
- Paige Salisbury (Kent State)

Legend

- (C) Team captain
- (S) Suspended
- (I) Ineligible
- (W) Walk-on
- Injured
- Current redshirt

Roster
Last update: February 19, 2024

== Schedule and results ==
Date time, TV	Rank^{#}	Opponent^{#}	Result	Record	Site (attendance) city, state
Exhibition
November 5, 2023*; 1:00 p.m.		Muskingum	W 106–35	–	MAC Center (–); Kent, OH
Non-conference regular season
November 12, 2023*; 6:00 p.m., ESPN+		at Louisiana; MAC–SBC Challenge	W 64–55	1–0	Cajundome (572); Lafayette, LA
November 14, 2023*; 12:00 p.m., SECN+		at No. 7 LSU	L 79–109	1–1	Pete Maravich Assembly Center (9,117); Baton Rouge, LA
November 21, 2023*; 7:00 p.m., FloHoops		at Xavier	W 64–57	2–1	Cintas Center (324); Cincinnati, OH
November 24, 2023*; 5:45 p.m., FloHoops		vs. Chattanooga; Daytona Beach Classic	L 54–64	2–2	Ocean Center (200); Daytona Beach, FL
November 25, 2023*; 5:45 p.m., FloHoops		vs. Missouri; Daytona Beach Classic	W 67–64	3–2	Ocean Center (250); Daytona Beach, FL
November 29, 2023*; 7:00 p.m., ESPN+		Coppin State	W 77–40	4–2	MAC Center (1,077); Kent, OH
December 3, 2023*; 2:00 p.m., ACCNX		at No. 15 Florida State	L 49–76	4–3	Donald L. Tucker Center (1,237); Tallahassee, FL
December 10, 2023*; 2:00 p.m., ESPN+		at Duquesne	L 82–89 ^{2OT}	4–4	UPMC Cooper Fieldhouse (1,054); Pittsburgh, PA
December 19, 2023*; 11:00 a.m., ESPN+		Lake Erie	W 84–20	5–4	MAC Center (1,791); Kent, OH
December 30, 2023*; 1:00 p.m., ESPN+		La Roche	W 109–31	6–4	MAC Center (788); Kent, OH
MAC regular season
January 3, 2024; 6:00 p.m., ESPN+		at Buffalo	W 73–64	7–4 (1–0)	Alumni Arena (1,188); Amherst, NY
January 6, 2024; 1:00 p.m., ESPN+		Ohio	W 92–63	8–4 (2–0)	MAC Center (820); Kent, OH
January 10, 2024; 7:00 p.m., ESPN+		at Miami (OH)	W 69–38	9–4 (3–0)	Millett Hall (289); Oxford, OH
January 14, 2024; 6:00 p.m., CBSSN		Northern Illinois	W 73–48	10–4 (4–0)	MAC Center (838); Kent, OH
January 17, 2024; 7:00 p.m., ESPN+		Toledo	L 76–87	10–5 (4–1)	MAC Center (1,321); Kent, OH
January 20, 2024; 2:00 p.m., ESPN+		at Akron	W 69–60	11–5 (5–1)	James A. Rhodes Arena (1,059); Akron, OH
January 24, 2024; 7:00 p.m., ESPN+		Eastern Michigan	W 66–57	12–5 (6–1)	MAC Center (754); Kent, OH
January 27, 2024; 4:00 p.m., ESPN+		at Bowling Green	W 82–74	13–5 (7–1)	Stroh Center (2,296); Bowling Green, OH
January 31, 2024; 6:30 p.m., ESPN+		at Ball State	L 46–57	13–6 (7–2)	Worthen Arena (1,073); Muncie, IN
February 3, 2024; 1:00 p.m., ESPN+		Central Michigan	W 2–0 Forfeit	13–6 (8–2)	MAC Center; Kent, OH
February 7, 2024; 7:00 p.m., ESPN+		Western Michigan	W 70–57	14–6 (9–2)	MAC Center (1,854); Kent, OH
February 10, 2024*; 1:00 p.m., ESPN+		Old Dominion; MAC–SBC Challenge	L 76–82	14–7	MAC Center (1,044); Kent, OH
February 17, 2024; 1:00 p.m., ESPN+		at Central Michigan	W 77–54	15–7 (10–2)	McGuirk Arena (1,189); Mount Pleasant, MI
February 21, 2024; 7:00 p.m., ESPN+		at Ohio	L 77–79	15–8 (10–3)	Convocation Center (567); Athens, OH
February 24, 2024; 1:00 p.m., ESPN+		Akron	W 73–51	16–8 (11–3)	MAC Center (2,080); Kent, OH
February 28, 2024; 7:00 p.m., ESPN+		at Eastern Michigan	W 76–64	17–8 (12–3)	George Gervin GameAbove Center (1,440); Ypsilanti, MI
March 2, 2024; 1:00 p.m., ESPN+		Buffalo	W 67–59	18–8 (13–3)	MAC Center (2,687); Kent, OH
March 6, 2024; 7:00 p.m., ESPN+		Ball State	L 71–75	18–9 (13–4)	MAC Center (1,290); Kent, OH
March 9, 2024; 2:00 p.m., ESPN+		at Toledo	L 61–83	18–10 (13–5)	Savage Arena (6,238); Toledo, OH
MAC tournament
March 13, 2024; 6:30 p.m., ESPN+	(3)	vs. (6) Northern Illinois; Quarterfinals	W 63–60	19–10	Rocket Mortgage FieldHouse (1,426); Cleveland, OH
March 15, 2024; 12:30 p.m., ESPN+	(3)	vs. (2) Ball State; Semifinals	W 65–50	20–10	Rocket Mortgage FieldHouse; Cleveland, OH
March 16, 2024; 11:00 a.m., CBSSN	(3)	vs. (4) Buffalo; Championship	W 78–60	21–10	Rocket Mortgage FieldHouse (2,292); Cleveland, OH
NCAA women's tournament
March 23, 2024*; 2:15 p.m., ESPN	(15 A1)	at (2 A1) No. 9 Notre Dame; First round	L 67–81	21–11	Joyce Center; Notre Dame, IN
*Non-conference game. ^{#}Rankings from AP poll. (#) Tournament seedings in parentheses. A1=Albany 1. All times are in Eastern.
