= 2023–24 Old Dominion Monarchs women's basketball team =

Intercollegiate basketball season

2023–24 Old Dominion Monarchs women's basketball

WNIT, Second round
- Conference: Sun Belt Conference
- Record: 22–10 (12–6 Sun Belt)
- Head coach: DeLisha Milton-Jones (4th season)
- Assistant coaches: Danielle Bell; Shammond Williams; Roland Jones Jr.
- Home arena: Chartway Arena

2023–24 Sun Belt Conference women's basketball standings
| | Conf. | | | | Overall |
| Team | W | | L | PCT | W | | L | PCT |
|---|---|---|---|---|---|---|---|---|
| Marshall † | 17 | – | 1 | .944 | 26 | – | 7 | .788 |
| Troy | 15 | – | 3 | .833 | 22 | – | 12 | .647 |
| James Madison | 13 | – | 5 | .722 | 23 | – | 12 | .657 |
| Old Dominion | 12 | – | 6 | .667 | 22 | – | 10 | .688 |
| Louisiana–Monroe | 10 | – | 8 | .556 | 21 | – | 14 | .600 |
| Southern Miss | 10 | – | 8 | .556 | 20 | – | 14 | .588 |
| Louisiana | 10 | – | 8 | .556 | 17 | – | 14 | .548 |
| Appalachian State | 9 | – | 9 | .500 | 17 | – | 15 | .531 |
| Georgia State | 9 | – | 9 | .500 | 15 | – | 15 | .500 |
| Arkansas State | 6 | – | 12 | .333 | 13 | – | 17 | .433 |
| Coastal Carolina | 5 | – | 13 | .278 | 12 | – | 21 | .364 |
| Georgia Southern | 4 | – | 14 | .222 | 15 | – | 18 | .455 |
| Texas State | 4 | – | 14 | .222 | 14 | – | 18 | .438 |
| South Alabama | 2 | – | 16 | .111 | 9 | – | 23 | .281 |
† 2024 Sun Belt tournament winner

The 2023–24 Old Dominion Monarchs women's basketball team represented Old Dominion University during the 2023–24 NCAA Division I women's basketball season. The Monarchs, led by fourth-year head coach DeLisha Milton-Jones, played their home games at Chartway Arena in Norfolk, Virginia as second-year members of the Sun Belt Conference.

The Monarchs finished fourth ranked in conference play, losing to Marshall in the conference tournament semifinals. They were invited to the WNIT where they lost to North Carolina A&T in the second round.

== Previous season ==
In their 2022–23 season, the Monarchs finished fifth ranked in conference play and lost to rival James Madison in the conference tournament semifinals.

== Roster ==
2023–24 Old Dominion Monarchs women's basketball team
Players
Coaches

| Pos. | # | Name | Height | Year | Previous school | Hometown |
|---|---|---|---|---|---|---|
| G | 0 | Joy Campbell | 5 ft 6 in (1.68 m) | Sr | Etiwanda HS; UC Riverside | Fontana, CA |
| G | 1 | La'Dajah Huguley | 5 ft 4 in (1.63 m) | Jr | Opelika HS; Chipola College | Opelika, AL |
| F | 2 | De'Shawnti Thomas | 5 ft 10 in (1.78 m) | Jr | Sapulpa HS; Seward County CC | Tulsa, OK |
| G/F | 3 | Simone Cunningham | 5 ft 10 in (1.78 m) | Jr | Pleasant Grove HS; Shelton State CC | Pleasant Grove, AL |
| G | 4 | Jordan McLaughlin | 5 ft 7 in (1.7 m) | Sr | Phillip O. Berry Acad. Chipola College | Charlotte, NC |
| G | 5 | Halima Salat | 5 ft 5 in (1.65 m) | Jr | Palo Duro HS; Seward County CC | Amarillo, TX |
| G | 11 | Kaye Clark | 5 ft 7 in (1.7 m) | GS | Rufus King HS; Trinity Valley CC | Milwaukee, WI |
| G | 12 | Mimi McCollister | 5 ft 6 in (1.68 m) | Jr | Athens HS; Trinity Valley CC | Athens, TX |
| F | 14 | Nnenna Orji | 6 ft 2 in (1.88 m) | Sr | Etiwanda HS; Hawaii | Rancho Cucamonga, CA |
| G/F | 20 | Ivi Nikolova | 6 ft 2 in (1.88 m) | Jr | Chipola College | Samokov, Bulgaria |
| F/C | 23 | Jenny Nkem Womsi | 6 ft 1 in (1.85 m) | Jr | Barton CC | Libreville, Gabon |
| C | 24 | Mikayla Brown | 6 ft 1 in (1.85 m) | So | Lincoln HS | Dallas, TX |
| G | 25 | En'Dya Buford | 5 ft 7 in (1.7 m) | Sr | Olive Branch HS; Memphis | Memphis, TN |
| F | 53 | Lanetta Williams | 6 ft 3 in (1.91 m) | GS | Arlington HS; Memphis | Memphis, TN |
| F | 55 | Brenda Fontana | 6 ft 1 in (1.85 m) | Jr | Vélez Sarsfield; UTEP | Moreno, Argentina |

Head coach

- DeLisha Milton-Jones (Florida)

Assistant coach(es)

- Danielle Bell (Georgia)
- Shammond Williams (North Carolina)
- Roland Jones Jr. (Central Methodist)

Legend

- (C) Team captain
- (S) Suspended
- (I) Ineligible
- (W) Walk-on
- Injured
- Current redshirt

Roster
Last update: November 6, 2023

== Schedule and results ==
| Date time, TV | Rank^{#} | Opponent^{#} | Result | Record | High points | High rebounds | High assists | Site (attendance) city, state |
Exhibition
| October 27, 2023*; 6:30 p.m. | | Christopher Newport | W 65–48 | – | 14 – Buford | 17 – Cunningham | 5 – Clark | Chartway Arena (1,981); Norfolk, VA |
Non-conference regular season
| November 6, 2023*; 4:00 p.m., ESPN+ | | Lincoln (PA) | W 72–50 | 1–0 | 14 – Buford | 9 – Cunningham | 3 – tied | Chartway Arena (1,914); Norfolk, VA |
| November 11, 2023*; 4:00 p.m., ESPN+ | | Buffalo; MAC–SBC Challenge | W 59–48 | 2–0 | 11 – tied | 9 – tied | 4 – McLaughlin | Chartway Arena (2,024); Norfolk, VA |
| November 14, 2023*; 6:30 p.m., ESPN+ | | Xavier | W 55–43 | 3–0 | 12 – Buford | 9 – Cunningham | 3 – tied | Chartway Arena (2,096); Norfolk, VA |
| November 17, 2023*; 11:00 a.m., ESPN+ | | Texas Southern | W 57–38 | 4–0 | 10 – Buford | 11 – Fontana | 3 – tied | Chartway Arena (2,552); Norfolk, VA |
| November 28, 2023*; 6:30 p.m., ESPN+ | | Elon | W 60–29 | 5–0 | 15 – Clark | 12 – Cunningham | 4 – Buford | Chartway Arena (1,653); Norfolk, VA |
| November 30, 2023*; 7:00 p.m., FloHoops | | at William & Mary; Rivalry | W 72–66 | 6–0 | 22 – McLaughlin | 8 – Brown | 5 – McLaughlin | Kaplan Arena (829); Williamsburg, VA |
| December 3, 2023*; 1:00 p.m., ESPN+ | | Florida Gulf Coast | W 55–42 | 7–0 | 22 – McLaughlin | 16 – Cunningham | 1 – tied | Chartway Arena (1,759); Norfolk, VA |
| December 7, 2023*; 7:00 p.m., FloHoops | | at Delaware | W 57–53 | 8–0 | 9 – tied | 6 – tied | 5 – Clark | Bob Carpenter Center (1,325); Newark, DE |
| December 17, 2023*; 1:00 p.m., ESPN+ | | at VCU; Rivalry | L 50–64 | 8–1 | 15 – Buford | 6 – McLaughlin | 2 – Fontana | Siegel Center (756); Richmond, VA |
| December 20, 2023*; 6:30 p.m., ESPN+ | | No. 3 NC State; Anne Donovan Classic | L 50–87 | 8–2 | 12 – Fontana | 4 – tied | 4 – McLaughlin | Chartway Arena (3,874); Norfolk, VA |
Sun Belt regular season
| December 30, 2023; 2:00 p.m., ESPN+ | | at South Alabama | W 62–56 | 9–2 (1–0) | 12 – McLaughlin | 7 – Fontana | 3 – McLaughlin | Mitchell Center (326); Mobile, AL |
| January 4, 2024; 6:30 p.m., ESPN+ | | Louisiana | L 61–66 | 9–3 (1–1) | 22 – McLaughlin | 7 – Cunningham | 3 – tied | Chartway Arena (1,745); Norfolk, VA |
| January 6, 2024; 1:00 p.m., ESPN+ | | Southern Miss | W 68–62 | 10–3 (2–1) | 19 – Fontana | 6 – tied | 6 – McLaughlin | Chartway Arena (1,816); Norfolk, VA |
| January 10, 2024; 6:00 p.m., ESPN+ | | at Coastal Carolina | W 71–57 | 11–3 (3–1) | 14 – tied | 8 – tied | 5 – McLaughlin | HTC Center (555); Conway, SC |
| January 13, 2024; 2:00 p.m., ESPN+ | | at Georgia Southern | W 70–50 | 12–3 (4–1) | 12 – tied | 7 – Clark | 4 – tied | Hanner Fieldhouse (697); Statesboro, GA |
| January 18, 2024; 6:00 p.m., ESPN+ | | at Marshall | L 60–90 | 12–4 (4–2) | 14 – tied | 6 – tied | 4 – Buford | Cam Henderson Center (1,098); Huntington, WV |
| January 20, 2024; 2:00 p.m., ESPN+ | | at James Madison; Royal Rivalry | L 64–72 | 12–5 (4–3) | 18 – Buford | 7 – Cunningham | 3 – Buford | Atlantic Union Bank Center (2,611); Harrisonburg, VA |
| January 25, 2024; 6:30 p.m., ESPN+ | | Appalachian State | W 68–49 | 13–5 (5–3) | 14 – Buford | 12 – Cunningham | 4 – McLaughlin | Chartway Arena (2,189); Norfolk, VA |
| January 27, 2024; 1:00 p.m., ESPN+ | | Georgia State | W 73–65 | 14–5 (6–3) | 18 – Buford | 10 – Cunningham | 4 – McLaughlin | Chartway Arena (3,198); Norfolk, VA |
| January 31, 2024; 12:00 p.m., ESPN+ | | at Texas State | W 66–58 | 15–5 (7–3) | 13 – tied | 9 – Cunningham | 2 – tied | Strahan Arena (3,318); San Marcos, TX |
| February 3, 2024; 1:00 p.m., ESPN+ | | at Arkansas State | L 63–76 | 15–6 (7–4) | 16 – Cunningham | 8 – Fontana | 5 – Clark | First National Bank Arena (2,743); Jonesboro, AR |
| February 7, 2024; 6:30 p.m., ESPN+ | | Troy | W 63–59 | 16–6 (8–4) | 21 – McLaughlin | 9 – Clark | 5 – Clark | Chartway Arena (2,685); Norfolk, VA |
| February 10, 2024*; 1:00 p.m., ESPN+ | | at Kent State; MAC–SBC Challenge | W 82–76 | 17–6 | 22 – Buford | 10 – Cunningham | 9 – Clark | MAC Center (1,044); Kent, OH |
| February 14, 2024; 6:30 p.m., ESPN+ | | Coastal Carolina | W 65–58 | 18–6 (9–4) | 18 – Fontana | 7 – Cunningham | 5 – Buford | Chartway Arena (1,710); Norfolk, VA |
| February 17, 2024; 2:00 p.m., ESPN+ | | Marshall | L 75–89 | 18–7 (9–5) | 16 – tied | 10 – Cunningham | 4 – McLaughlin | Chartway Arena (2,556); Norfolk, VA |
| February 22, 2024; 6:30 p.m., ESPN+ | | at Appalachian State | W 81–62 | 19–7 (10–5) | 17 – tied | 10 – Cunningham | 5 – Clark | Holmes Center (332); Boone, NC |
| February 24, 2024; 5:00 p.m., ESPN+ | | at Georgia State | W 67–51 | 20–7 (11–5) | 25 – Buford | 10 – Cunningham | 3 – Buford | GSU Convocation Center (1,536); Atlanta, GA |
| February 27, 2024; 6:30 p.m., ESPN+ | | Georgia Southern | W 61–54 | 21–7 (12–5) | 20 – Buford | 9 – McLaughlin | 5 – tied | Chartway Arena (1,896); Norfolk, VA |
| March 1, 2024; 6:30 p.m., ESPN+ | | James Madison; Royal Rivalry | L 58–70 | 21–8 (12–6) | 14 – Fontana | 12 – TEAM | 6 – McLaughlin | Chartway Arena (4,342); Norfolk, VA |
Sun Belt tournament
| March 8, 2024; 3:00 p.m., ESPN+ | (4) | vs. (5) Louisiana–Monroe; Quarterfinals | W 67–64 | 22–8 | 19 – McLaughlin | 11 – Fontana | 5 – McLaughlin | Pensacola Bay Center (785); Pensacola, FL |
| March 10, 2024; 12:30 p.m., ESPN+ | (4) | vs. (1) Marshall; Semifinals | L 70–76 | 22–9 | 16 – Clark | 12 – Clark | 7 – Clark | Pensacola Bay Center (754); Pensacola, FL |
WNIT
| March 24, 2024*; 7:00 p.m., FloHoops | | at North Carolina A&T; Second round | L 45–48 | 22–10 | 16 – Clark | 8 – Clark | 5 – Clark | Corbett Sports Center (3,224); Greensboro, NC |
*Non-conference game. ^{#}Rankings from AP poll. (#) Tournament seedings in parentheses. All times are in Eastern.

- Source: Old Dominion Athletics

== See also ==
- 2023–24 Old Dominion Monarchs men's basketball team
