= 2023–24 Bowling Green Falcons women's basketball team =

Intercollegiate basketball season

2023–24 Bowling Green Falcons women's basketball

WNIT, First Round
- Conference: Mid-American Conference
- Record: 16–15 (10–8 MAC)
- Head coach: Fred Chmiel (1st season)
- Assistant coaches: Nick DiPillo; Lexxus Graham-Blincoe; Maggie Lucas
- Home arena: Stroh Center

2023–24 Mid-American Conference women's basketball standings
	Conf.				Overall
Team	W		L	PCT	W		L	PCT
Toledo	17	–	1	.944	28	–	6	.824
Ball State	16	–	2	.889	28	–	6	.824
Kent State †	13	–	5	.722	21	–	12	.636
Buffalo	10	–	8	.556	19	–	14	.576
Bowling Green	10	–	8	.556	16	–	15	.516
Northern Illinois	8	–	10	.444	15	–	16	.484
Ohio	8	–	10	.444	11	–	19	.367
Western Michigan	7	–	11	.389	12	–	18	.400
Miami (OH)	6	–	12	.333	9	–	20	.310
Akron	6	–	12	.333	11	–	18	.379
Central Michigan	4	–	14	.222	6	–	22	.214
Eastern Michigan	3	–	15	.167	7	–	22	.241
† 2024 MAC tournament winner

The 2023–24 Bowling Green Falcons women's basketball team represented Bowling Green State University during the 2023–24 NCAA Division I women's basketball season. The Falcons, led by first year head coach Fred Chmiel, played their home games at the Stroh Center in Bowling Green, Ohio as a member of the Mid-American Conference.

== Previous season ==
The Falcons finished 31–7 and 14–4 in the MAC play to finish second in the MAC. They were runners up for the MAC tournament. The Falcons were selected to play in the 2023 WNIT. The team fell to Columbia in the Fab 4. After the season, head coach Robyn Fralick became the head coach for Michigan State Spartans women's basketball.

== Preseason ==
Prior to the season Bowling Green was picked fourth in the MAC preseason poll.

=== Preseason rankings ===
MAC preseason poll
Predicted finish	Team	Votes (1st place)
1	Toledo	121 (11)
2	Ball State	110 (1)
3	Kent State	102
4	Bowling Green	77
5	Northern Illinois	99
6	Akron	69
7	Eastern Michigan	66
8	Buffalo	50
9	Ohio	40
10	Western Michigan	38
11	Central Michigan	24
12	Miami	23

MAC Tournament Champion: Toledo (10), Ball State (2)

== Roster ==
2023–24 Bowling Green Falcons women's basketball team
Players
Coaches

Pos.	#	Name	Height	Year	Previous school	Hometown
G	0	Morgan Sharps	5 ft 10 in (1.78 m)	Sr	Newark	Granville, OH
G	1	Amy Velasco	5 ft 7 in (1.7 m)	Jr	Centerville	Centerville, OH
G	2	Emily Siesel	5 ft 6 in (1.68 m)	So	Buckeye Central	New Washington, OH
F	3	Sophie Dziekan	6 ft 2 in (1.88 m)	Sr	Brighton	Brighton, MI
G	5	Abbie Riddle	5 ft 10 in (1.78 m)	Fr	Liberty Union	Baltimore, OH
G	10	Paige Kohler	5 ft 8 in (1.73 m)	Fr	Olmsted Falls	Olmsted Falls, OH
F	11	Taya Ellis	6 ft 1 in (1.85 m)	Fr	Royal Crown	Toronto, Ontario, CA
F	13	Olivia Hill	6 ft 0 in (1.83 m)	Sr	Fremd	Palatine, IL
F	14	Keiryn McGuff	6 ft 0 in (1.83 m)	Fr	Dublin Coffman	Dublin, OH
G	20	Jasmine Fearne	5 ft 11 in (1.8 m)	So	Hickory Ridge	Cairns, AUS
F	23	Jasmine Clerkley	5 ft 11 in (1.8 m)	Sr	Okemos	Okemos, MI
G	25	Lexi Fleming	5 ft 5 in (1.65 m)	Sr	Mercy McAuley	Cincinnati, OH
F	32	Erika Porter	6 ft 0 in (1.83 m)	Sr	Notre Dame	West Windsor, NJ
F	33	Jaci Tubergen	5 ft 11 in (1.8 m)	So	Hudsonville	Hudsonville, MI

Head coach

- Fred Chmiel (Excelsior College)

Assistant coach(es)

- Nick DiPillo (Fairleigh Dickinson)
- Lexxus Graham-Blincoe (Campbellsville)
- Maggie Lucas (Penn State)

Legend

- (C) Team captain
- (S) Suspended
- (I) Ineligible
- (W) Walk-on
- Injured
- Current redshirt

Roster
Last update: January 23, 2024

=== Support Staff ===
2023-24 Bowling Green Falcons Support Staff
- Audra Clark - Video Coordinator
- Zhaque Gray - Director of Player Personnel
- Tim Kjar - Director of Operations
- Matt St. Louis - Assistant Athletic Trainer

== Schedule ==
Date time, TV	Rank^{#}	Opponent^{#}	Result	Record	High points	High rebounds	High assists	Site (attendance) city, state
Exhibition
November 2, 2023*; 6:00 p.m.		Purdue Northwest	W 82–43	–	20 – Fleming	10 – Ellis	4 – Kohler	Stroh Center (1,450); Bowling Green, OH
Non-conference regular season
November 7, 2023*; 6:00 p.m., ESPN+		at Cleveland State	W 89–86	1–0	20 – Tied	7 – Porter	8 – Velasco	Stroh Center (1,813); Bowling Green, OH
November 11, 2023*; 2:00 p.m., ESPN+		at Texas State; MAC-SBC Challenge	L 48–75	1–1	14 – Velasco	11 – Ellis	3 – Kohler	Strahan Arena (823); San Marcos, TX
November 18, 2023*; 2:00 p.m., FloSports		at Xavier	W 73–64	2–1	21 – Fleming	7 – Fleming	6 – Kohler	Cintas Center (513); Cincinnati, OH
November 22, 2023*; 12:00 p.m.		vs. Mercer; Savannah Hoops Invitational	W 59–38	3–1	14 – Fleming	9 – Tied	5 – Tied	Enmarket Arena (123); Savannah, GA
November 23, 2023*; 9:00 a.m.		vs. Lehigh; Savannah Hoops Invitational	W 85–73	4–1	22 – Fleming	7 – Flemming	6 – Kohler	Enmarket Arena (104); Savannah, GA
November 27, 2023*; 7:00 p.m., ESPN+		at Duquesne	W 68–66	5–1	19 – Fleming	10 – Clerkley	4 – Kohler	Stroh Center (1,717); Bowling Green OH
December 2, 2023*; 12:30 p.m., FS1		at No. 4 Iowa	L 65–99	5–2	24 – Fleming	7 – Fleming	6 – Velasco	Carver–Hawkeye Arena (14,998); Iowa City, IA
December 17, 2023*; 11:00 a.m., ESPN+		at Wright State	W 69–48	6–2	19 – Sharps	10 – Dziekan	3 – Tied	Nutter Center (7,574); Fairborn, OH
December 19, 2023*; 7:00 p.m., ESPN+		No. 1 South Carolina	L 62–93	6–3	25 – Sharps	7 – Tied	6 – Velasco	Stroh Center (4,195); Bowling Green, OH
December 22, 2023*; 6:00 p.m., B1G+		at No. 16 Indiana	L 35–84	6–4	14 – Velasco	5 – Tied	2 – Velasco	Simon Skjodt Assembly Hall (9,067); Bloomington, IN
MAC regular season
January 3, 2024; 7:00 p.m., ESPN+		at Central Michigan	W 65–64	7–4 (1–0)	28 – Kohler	7 – McGuff	4 – Tied	McGuirk Arena (970); Mount Pleasant, MI
January 6, 2024; 2:00 p.m., ESPN+		Western Michigan	W 75–69	8–4 (2–0)	19 – Sharps	7 – Tied	5 – Velasco	Stroh Center (2,054); Bowling Green, OH
January 10, 2024; 7:00 p.m., ESPN+		Eastern Michigan	W 69–57	9–4 (3–0)	15 – Kohler	10 – Porter	6 – Velasco	Stroh Center (1,897); Bowling Green, OH
January 13, 2024; 2:00 p.m., ESPN+		at Ball State	L 61–76	9–5 (3–1)	28 – Velasco	11 – McGuff	2 – Tied	Worthen Arena (1,068); Muncie, IN
January 17, 2024; 7:00 p.m., ESPN+		Akron	W 70–59	10–5 (4–1)	24 – Porter	6 – Tied	6 – Sharps	Stroh Center (2,035); Bowling Green, OH
January 20, 2024; 1:00 p.m., ESPN+		at Miami (OH)	L 47–56	10–6 (4–2)	16 – Porter	19 – Porter	3 – Tied	Millett Hall (385); Oxford, OH
January 24, 2024; 11:00 a.m., ESPN+		at Buffalo	L 72–82	10–7 (4–3)	16 – Tied	13 – Porter	11 – Velasco	Alumni Arena (2,273); Buffalo, NY
January 27, 2024; 4:00 p.m., ESPN+		Kent State	L 74–82	10–8 (4–4)	30 – Sharps	6 – Velasco	7 – Velasco	Stroh Center (2,296); Bowling Green, OH
January 31, 2024; 7:00 p.m., ESPN+		Northern Illinois	W 72–54	11–8 (5–4)	22 – Sharps	6 – Tied	9 – Velasco	Stroh Center (2,420); Bowling Green, OH
February 3, 2024; 2:00 p.m., ESPN+		at Toledo	L 70–82	11–9 (5–5)	22 – Kohler	8 – Hill	5 – Tied	Savage Arena (6,077); Toledo, OH
February 7, 2024; 7:00 p.m., ESPN+		at Ohio	W 69–52	12–9 (6–5)	19 – Porter	13 – Porter	8 – Velasco	Stroh Center (2,151); Bowling Green, OH
February 10, 2024*; 2:00 p.m., ESPN+		Troy; MAC-SBC Challenge	L 78–88	12–10 (6–5)	28 – Sharps	9 – Ellis	7 – Tied	Stroh Center (1,915); Bowling Green, OH
February 17, 2024; 6:00 p.m., ESPN+		Toledo	L 68–88	12–11 (6–6)	22 – Sharps	9 – Hill	3 – Velasco	Stroh Center (3,998); Bowling Green, OH
February 21, 2024; 7:00 p.m., ESPN+		at Akron	W 74–68	13–11 (7–6)	22 – Porter	16 – Porter	4 – Tied	James A. Rhodes Arena (837); Akron, OH
February 24, 2024; 2:00 p.m., ESPN+		at Northern Illinois	W 82–73	14–11 (8–6)	32 – Velasco	6 – Tied	7 – Kohler	NIU Convocation Center (1,401); DeKalb, IL
February 28, 2024; 7:00 p.m., ESPN+		Buffalo	L 55–70	14–12 (8–7)	22 – Porter	13 – Porter	6 – Velasco	Stroh Center (1,868); Bowling Green, OH
March 2, 2024; 2:00 p.m., ESPN+		Miami (OH)	W 66–47	15–12 (9–7)	29 – Sharps	15 – Porter	6 – Tied	Stroh Center (1,996); Bowling Green, OH
March 6, 2024; 7:00 p.m., ESPN+		at Western Michigan	W 87–73	16–12 (10–7)	26 – Sharps	10 – Hill	5 – Tied	University Arena; Kalamazoo, MI
March 9, 2024; 1:00 p.m., ESPN+		at Eastern Michigan	L 54–59	16–13 (10–8)	21 – Porter	11 – Porter	5 – Velasco	Convocation Center (1,476); Ypsilanti, MI
MAC tournament
March 13, 2024; 1:30 p.m., ESPN+	(5)	vs. (4) Buffalo; Quarterfinals	L 64–70	16–14	19 – Tied	11 – Hill	3 – Sharps	Rocket Mortgage FieldHouse (1,426); Cleveland, OH
WNIT
March 21, 2024*; 4:00 p.m.		at Butler; First Round	L 63–75	16–15	32 – Porter	9 – Porter	3 – Tied	Hinkle Fieldhouse (537); Indianapolis, IN
*Non-conference game. ^{#}Rankings from AP Poll. (#) Tournament seedings in parentheses. All times are in Eastern Time.
