= 2023–24 Western Michigan Broncos women's basketball team =

American college basketball season

2023–24 Western Michigan Broncos women's basketball
- Conference: Mid-American Conference
- Record: 12–13 (7–7 MAC)
- Head coach: Shane Clipfell (12th season)
- Associate head coach: Terrance Slater
- Assistant coaches: Meredith Applin; Peyton Booth; Quim Gomez
- Home arena: University Arena

2023–24 Mid-American Conference women's basketball standings
	Conf.				Overall
Team	W		L	PCT	W		L	PCT
Toledo	17	–	1	.944	28	–	6	.824
Ball State	16	–	2	.889	28	–	6	.824
Kent State †	13	–	5	.722	21	–	12	.636
Buffalo	10	–	8	.556	19	–	14	.576
Bowling Green	10	–	8	.556	16	–	15	.516
Northern Illinois	8	–	10	.444	15	–	16	.484
Ohio	8	–	10	.444	11	–	19	.367
Western Michigan	7	–	11	.389	12	–	18	.400
Miami (OH)	6	–	12	.333	9	–	20	.310
Akron	6	–	12	.333	11	–	18	.379
Central Michigan	4	–	14	.222	6	–	22	.214
Eastern Michigan	3	–	15	.167	7	–	22	.241
† 2024 MAC tournament winner

The 2023–24 Western Michigan Broncos women's basketball team represented Western Michigan University during the 2023–24 NCAA Division I women's basketball season. The Broncos, led by 12th-year head coach Shane Clipfell, played their home games at University Arena in Kalamazoo, Michigan as members of the Mid-American Conference (MAC).

The Broncos finished the season 12–13, 7–7 in MAC play, to finish in eighth place. They were defeated by top-seeded Toledo in the quarterfinals of the MAC tournament.

== Previous season ==
The Broncos finished the 2022–23 season 12–17, 7–11 in MAC play, to finish in a four-way tie for seventh place. Due to tiebreakers, they failed to qualify for the MAC tournament, as only the top eight teams qualify.

== Roster ==
2023–24 Western Michigan Broncos women's basketball team
Players
Coaches

Pos.	#	Name	Height	Year	Previous school	Hometown
G/F	1	Denali Craig-Edwards	6 ft 1 in (1.85 m)	Fr	Peoria High School	Peoria, IL
G	3	Hannah Spitzley	6 ft 0 in (1.83 m)	Sr	Pewamo-Westphalia High School	Westphalia, MI
F	4	De'Ahna Richardson	6 ft 1 in (1.85 m)	RS So	Bolingbrook High School	Bolingbrook, IL
G	5	Artemis Kouki	6 ft 0 in (1.83 m)	RS So	ACS Athens	Athens, Greece
G	10	Gabi Saxman	5 ft 7 in (1.7 m)	Sr	Schoolcraft High School	Schoolcraft, MI
G	11	Megan Wagner	5 ft 7 in (1.7 m)	Sr	Mason High School	Mason, OH
G	12	Alli Carlson	5 ft 6 in (1.68 m)	So	East Grand Rapids High School	Grand Rapids, MI
G	14	Kaiden Glenn	5 ft 10 in (1.78 m)	Jr	Austin Peay	Ypsilanti, MI
C	15	Lauren Audino	6 ft 2 in (1.88 m)	Jr	St. Mary Catholic Secondary School	Welland, ON
G	20	McKenna Macon	5 ft 8 in (1.73 m)	Fr	Lawton High School	Lawton, MI
F	21	Jasmine Elder	6 ft 1 in (1.85 m)	GS	Kentucky State	Wayne, MI
G	22	Kaitlyn Zarycki	5 ft 8 in (1.73 m)	GS	Saginaw Valley State	Niles, MI
C	23	Evyn Carrier	6 ft 4 in (1.93 m)	Fr	Sycamore High School	Sycamore, IL
G	32	Maggie Stutelberg	5 ft 11 in (1.8 m)	RS So	Glenbard West High School	Glen Ellyn, IL
G	33	Nile Muguira Orbe	5 ft 6 in (1.68 m)	Fr	Lointek Gernika Bizkaia Club	Guernica, Spain

Head coach

- Shane Clipfell (Eastern Michigan)

Assistant coach(es)

- Terrance Slater (Western Michigan)
- Meredith Applin (Western Michigan)
- Peyton Booth (New Hampshire)
- Quim Gomez (Autonomous University of Barcelona)

Legend

- (C) Team captain
- (S) Suspended
- (I) Ineligible
- (W) Walk-on
- Injured
- Current redshirt

Roster
Last update: February 22, 2024

== Schedule and results ==
Date time, TV	Rank^{#}	Opponent^{#}	Result	Record	Site (attendance) city, state
Exhibition
October 29, 2023*; 1:00 p.m.		Aquinas	W 76–47	–	University Arena (742); Kalamazoo, MI
November 2, 2023*; 7:00 p.m.		Goshen	W 75–53	–	University Arena (–); Kalamazoo, MI
Non-conference regular season
November 6, 2023*; 8:00 p.m., FloHoops		at DePaul	L 53–77	0–1	Wintrust Arena (1,111); Chicago, IL
November 10, 2023*; 6:30 p.m., ESPN+		at Georgia State; MAC–SBC Challenge	L 58–71	0–2	GSU Convocation Center (703); Atlanta, GA
November 16, 2023*; 5:00 p.m., ESPN+		at Youngstown State	W 54–52	1–2	Beeghly Center (1,182); Youngstown, OH
November 24, 2023*; 6:30 p.m.		vs. Campbell; Puerto Rico Tournament	L 61–70	1–3	Coliseo Rubén Rodríguez (100); Bayamón, Puerto Rico
November 25, 2023*; 5:00 p.m.		vs. UNC Asheville; Puerto Rico Tournament	W 58–54	2–3	Coliseo Rubén Rodríguez (100); Bayamón, Puerto Rico
November 29, 2023*; 7:00 p.m., ESPN+		Valparaiso	W 75–71 ^{OT}	3–3	University Arena (757); Kalamazoo, MI
December 2, 2023*; 12:00 p.m., ESPN+		Davenport	W 61–48	4–3	University Arena (788); Kalamazoo, MI
December 6, 2023*; 7:00 p.m., ESPN+		Detroit Mercy	L 59–62	4–4	University Arena (640); Kalamazoo, MI
December 17, 2023*; 2:00 p.m., ESPN+		Purdue Fort Wayne	W 78–76	5–4	University Arena (826); Kalamazoo, MI
December 21, 2023*; 6:00 p.m., ACCN		at No. 14 Notre Dame	L 47–84	5–5	Purcell Pavilion (5,367); Notre Dame, IN
MAC regular season
January 3, 2024; 7:00 p.m., ESPN+		Ball State	L 56–78	5–6 (0–1)	University Arena (868); Kalamazoo, MI
January 6, 2024; 2:00 p.m., ESPN+		at Bowling Green	L 69–75	5–7 (0–2)	Stroh Center (2,054); Bowling Green, OH
January 10, 2024; 7:00 p.m., ESPN+		at Toledo	L 55–82	5–8 (0–3)	Savage Arena (3,694); Toledo, OH
January 13, 2024; 3:00 p.m., ESPN+		Miami (OH)	L 50–63	5–9 (0–4)	University Arena (775); Kalamazoo, MI
January 17, 2024; 7:00 p.m., ESPN+		Ohio	W 73–58	6–9 (1–4)	University Arena (699); Kalamazoo, MI
January 20, 2024; 2:00 p.m., ESPN+		at Buffalo	W 66–63	7–9 (2–4)	Alumni Arena (1,338); Amherst, NY
January 24, 2024; 7:00 p.m., ESPN+		Akron	W 60–51	8–9 (3–4)	University Arena (675); Kalamazoo, MI
January 27, 2024; 1:00 p.m., ESPN+		at Central Michigan	L 45–53	8–10 (3–5)	McGuirk Arena (1,302); Mount Pleasant, MI
January 31, 2024; 7:00 p.m., ESPN+		at Eastern Michigan	W 76–49	9–10 (4–5)	George Gervin GameAbove Center (1,358); Ypsilanti, MI
February 7, 2024; 7:00 p.m., ESPN+		at Kent State	L 57–70	9–11 (4–6)	MAC Center (1,854); Kent, OH
February 10, 2024*; 2:00 p.m., ESPN+		Appalachian State; MAC–SBC Challenge	L 68–78	9–12	University Arena (984); Kalamazoo, MI
February 14, 2024; 12:00 p.m., ESPN+		at Northern Illinois	W 65–47	10–12 (5–6)	Convocation Center (1,958); DeKalb, IL
February 17, 2024; 1:00 p.m., ESPN+		at Miami (OH)	L 50–58	10–13 (5–7)	Millett Hall (1,472); Oxford, OH
February 21, 2024; 7:00 p.m., ESPN+		Eastern Michigan	W 65–55	11–13 (6–7)	University Arena (797); Kalamazoo, MI
February 24, 2024; 12:00 p.m., ESPN+		Central Michigan	W 76–49	12–13 (7–7)	University Arena (1,323); Kalamazoo, MI
February 28, 2024; 7:00 p.m., ESPN+		at Ohio	L 64–67	12–14 (7–8)	Convocation Center (680); Athens, OH
March 2, 2024; 1:00 p.m., ESPN+		Toledo	L 69–84	12–15 (7–9)	University Arena (1,004); Kalamazoo, MI
March 6, 2024; 7:00 p.m., ESPN+		Bowling Green	L 73–87	12–16 (7–10)	University Arena; Kalamazoo, MI
March 9, 2024; 1:00 p.m., ESPN+		Northern Illinois	L 64–66	12–17 (7–11)	University Arena; Kalamazoo, MI
MAC tournament
March 13–16, 2024; ESPN+/CBSSN	(8)	vs. (1) Toledo; Quarterfinals	L 61–72	12–18	Rocket Mortgage FieldHouse; Cleveland, OH
*Non-conference game. ^{#}Rankings from AP poll. (#) Tournament seedings in parentheses. All times are in Eastern.
