= 2023–24 Akron Zips women's basketball team =

American college basketball season

2023–24 Akron Zips women's basketball
- Conference: Mid-American Conference
- Record: 9–16 (4–10 MAC)
- Head coach: Ryan Gensler (1st season)
- Assistant coaches: Jessica Jenkins; Sarah Jones; Erin Mills-Reid
- Home arena: James A. Rhodes Arena

2023–24 Mid-American Conference women's basketball standings
	Conf.				Overall
Team	W		L	PCT	W		L	PCT
Toledo	17	–	1	.944	28	–	6	.824
Ball State	16	–	2	.889	28	–	6	.824
Kent State †	13	–	5	.722	21	–	12	.636
Buffalo	10	–	8	.556	19	–	14	.576
Bowling Green	10	–	8	.556	16	–	15	.516
Northern Illinois	8	–	10	.444	15	–	16	.484
Ohio	8	–	10	.444	11	–	19	.367
Western Michigan	7	–	11	.389	12	–	18	.400
Miami (OH)	6	–	12	.333	9	–	20	.310
Akron	6	–	12	.333	11	–	18	.379
Central Michigan	4	–	14	.222	6	–	22	.214
Eastern Michigan	3	–	15	.167	7	–	22	.241
† 2024 MAC tournament winner

The 2023–24 Akron Zips women's basketball team represented the University of Akron during the 2023–24 NCAA Division I women's basketball season. The Zips, led by first-year head coach Ryan Gensler, played their home games at the James A. Rhodes Arena in Akron, Ohio as members of the Mid-American Conference.

== Previous season ==
The Zips finished the 2022–23 season 17–13, 8–10 in MAC play to finish in a tie for fifth place. In the MAC tournament, they were defeated by Ball State in the quarterfinals.

On February 21, 2023, the school announced that head coach Melissa Jackson's contract would not be renewed at the end of the season, ending her five-year tenure with the Zips. On March 29, Illinois assistant coach Ryan Gensler was named the team's next head coach.

== Roster ==
2023–24 Akron Zips women's basketball team
Players
Coaches

Pos.	#	Name	Height	Year	Previous school	Hometown
G	0	Kaia Woods	5 ft 3 in (1.6 m)	Jr	Washington State	Tiffin, Ohio
G	2	Alexus Mobley	5 ft 7 in (1.7 m)	Jr	Danville Area Community College	Indianapolis, Indiana
F	3	Annie Watson	6 ft 0 in (1.83 m)	So	St. Vincent–St. Mary High School	Akron, Ohio
G/F	4	Leila Jones	5 ft 10 in (1.78 m)	Fr	Westerville South High School	Westerville, Ohio
F	5	Lanae Riley	6 ft 2 in (1.88 m)	So	Middle Tennessee	Akron, Ohio
G	10	Alexis Stewart	5 ft 10 in (1.78 m)	Sr	St. Thomas More Catholic Secondary School	Hamilton, Ontario
G	12	Dacia Lewandowski	5 ft 11 in (1.8 m)	Fr	North Catholic High School	Pittsburgh, Pennsylvania
C	14	Liisa Taponen	6 ft 5 in (1.96 m)	So	Illinois	Tampere, Finland
G	15	Morgan Haney	5 ft 8 in (1.73 m)	RS Sr	Albany	Piqua, Ohio
G	22	Teniesha Clarke	5 ft 9 in (1.75 m)	Fr	Niagara Prep	Burlington, Ontario
G	23	Zakia Rasheed	5 ft 8 in (1.73 m)	Jr	Bishop Chatard High School	Avon, Indiana
G	24	Olivia Brown	5 ft 7 in (1.7 m)	Fr	Hamilton Southeastern High School	Fishers, Indiana
G	25	Tahmala Thorpe	5 ft 4 in (1.63 m)	Sr	St. Francis Xavier	Mississauga, Ontario
F	34	Reagan Bass	6 ft 1 in (1.85 m)	Jr	Strongsville High School	Strongsville, Ohio

Head coach

- Ryan Gensler (Saint Joseph's)

Assistant coach(es)

- Jessica Jenkins (St. Bonaventure)
- Sarah Jones (Villanova)
- Erin Mills-Reid (Fairleigh Dickinson)

Legend

- (C) Team captain
- (S) Suspended
- (I) Ineligible
- (W) Walk-on
- Injured
- Current redshirt

Roster
Last update: February 25, 2024

== Schedule and results ==
Date time, TV	Rank^{#}	Opponent^{#}	Result	Record	Site (attendance) city, state
Exhibition
November 2, 2023*; 7:30 pm		Walsh	W 77–51	–	James A. Rhodes Arena (736); Akron, OH
Non-conference regular season
November 6, 2023*; 7:00 pm, ESPN+		Oakland	L 87–91 ^{2OT}	0–1	James A. Rhodes Arena (797); Akron, OH
November 11, 2023*; 3:00 pm, ESPN+		at Southern Miss; MAC-SBC Challenge	L 60–77	0–2	Reed Green Coliseum (1,375); Hattiesburg, MS
November 15, 2023*; 11:00 am, ESPN+		at Robert Morris	W 63–58 ^{OT}	1–2	UPMC Events Center (510); Moon Township, PA
November 24, 2023*; 11:00 am, FloHoops		vs. Wichita State; Daytona Beach Classic	L 61–63	1–3	Ocean Center (200); Daytona Beach, FL
November 25, 2023*; 1:15 pm, FloHoops		vs. Pittsburgh; Daytona Beach Classic	W 75–72 ^{OT}	2–3	Ocean Center (200); Daytona Beach, FL
December 3, 2023*; 2:00 pm, ESPN+		Tennessee State	W 55–49	3–3	James A. Rhodes Arena (–); Akron, OH
December 6, 2023*; 6:30 pm, ESPN+		at Youngstown State	L 52–53	3–4	Beeghly Center (1,761); Youngstown, OH
December 10, 2023*; 2:00 pm, ESPN+		at Cleveland State	L 62–71	3–5	Wolstein Center (262); Cleveland, OH
December 21, 2023*; 4:00 pm, ESPN+		Bellarmine	W 88–65	4–5	James A. Rhodes Arena (1,685); Akron, OH
December 30, 2023*; 1:00 pm, ESPN+		at Canisius	W 53–48	5–5	Koessler Athletic Center (520); Buffalo, NY
MAC regular season
January 3, 2024; 7:00 pm, ESPN+		at Ohio	L 58–67	5–6 (0–1)	Convocation Center (308); Athens, OH
January 6, 2024; 2:00 pm, ESPN+		Ball State	L 64–71 ^{OT}	5–7 (0–2)	James A. Rhodes Arena (802); Akron, OH
January 10, 2024; 7:00 pm, ESPN+		Central Michigan	W 70–62	6–7 (1–2)	James A. Rhodes Arena (649); Akron, OH
January 13, 2024; 2:00 pm, ESPN+		at Buffalo	L 57–59	6–8 (1–3)	Alumni Arena (1,146); Amherst, NY
January 17, 2024; 7:00 pm, ESPN+		at Bowling Green	L 59–70	6–9 (1–4)	Stroh Center (2,035); Bowling Green, OH
January 20, 2024; 2:00 pm, ESPN+		Kent State	L 60–69	6–10 (1–5)	James A. Rhodes Arena (1,059); Akron, OH
January 24, 2024; 7:00 pm, ESPN+		at Western Michigan	L 51–60	6–11 (1–6)	University Arena (675); Kalamazoo, MI
January 27, 2024; 2:00 pm, ESPN+		at Northern Illinois	W 61–59	7–11 (2–6)	Convocation Center (980); DeKalb, IL
January 31, 2024; 7:00 pm, ESPN+		Toledo	L 66–88	7–12 (2–7)	James A. Rhodes Arena (1,004); Akron, OH
February 3, 2024; 2:00 pm, ESPN+		Miami (OH)	L 48–58	7–13 (2–8)	James A. Rhodes Arena (847); Akron, OH
February 7, 2024; 7:00 pm, ESPN+		at Eastern Michigan	W 68–67 ^{OT}	8–13 (3–8)	George Gervin GameAbove Center (1,431); Ypsilanti, MI
February 10, 2024*; 2:00 pm, ESPN+		Arkansas State; MAC-SBC Challenge	L 67–81	8–14	James A. Rhodes Arena (813); Akron, OH
February 17, 2024; 2:00 pm, ESPN+		Buffalo	W 65–54	9–14 (4–8)	James A. Rhodes Arena (749); Akron, OH
February 21, 2024; 7:00 pm, ESPN+		Bowling Green	L 68–74	9–15 (4–9)	James A. Rhodes Arena (837); Akron, OH
February 24, 2024; 1:00 pm, ESPN+		at Kent State	L 51–73	9–16 (4–10)	MAC Center (2,080); Kent, OH
February 28, 2024; 6:30 pm, ESPN+		at Ball State	L 41-75	9-17 (4-11)	Worthen Arena (1,167); Muncie, IN
March 2, 2024; 4:00 pm, ESPN+		Northern Illinois	W 69-54	10-17 (5-11)	James A. Rhodes Arena (449); Akron, OH
March 6, 2024; 6:00 pm, ESPN+		Ohio	L 63-72	10-18 (5-12)	James A. Rhodes Arena (321); Akron, OH
March 9, 2024; 1:00 pm, ESPN+		at Central Michigan	W 65-57	11-18 (6-12)	McGuirk Arena (1,081); Mount Pleasant, MI
*Non-conference game. ^{#}Rankings from AP Poll. (#) Tournament seedings in parentheses. All times are in Eastern.
