= 2023–24 Central Michigan Chippewas women's basketball team =

American college basketball season

2023–24 Central Michigan Chippewas women's basketball
- Conference: Mid-American Conference
- Record: 6–22 (4–14 MAC)
- Head coach: Kristin Haynie (1st season)
- Assistant coaches: Chelsie Butler; Toccara Ross; Jenna Allen
- Home arena: McGuirk Arena

2023–24 Mid-American Conference women's basketball standings
	Conf.				Overall
Team	W		L	PCT	W		L	PCT
Toledo	17	–	1	.944	28	–	6	.824
Ball State	16	–	2	.889	28	–	6	.824
Kent State †	13	–	5	.722	21	–	12	.636
Buffalo	10	–	8	.556	19	–	14	.576
Bowling Green	10	–	8	.556	16	–	15	.516
Northern Illinois	8	–	10	.444	15	–	16	.484
Ohio	8	–	10	.444	11	–	19	.367
Western Michigan	7	–	11	.389	12	–	18	.400
Miami (OH)	6	–	12	.333	9	–	20	.310
Akron	6	–	12	.333	11	–	18	.379
Central Michigan	4	–	14	.222	6	–	22	.214
Eastern Michigan	3	–	15	.167	7	–	22	.241
† 2024 MAC tournament winner

The 2023–24 Central Michigan Chippewas women's basketball team represented Central Michigan University during the 2023–24 NCAA Division I women's basketball season. The Chippewas, led by first-year head coach Kristin Haynie, played their home games at McGuirk Arena in Mount Pleasant, Michigan as members of the Mid-American Conference (MAC).

== Previous season ==
The Chippewas finished the 2022–23 season 6–23, 4–14 in MAC play, to finish in a tie for eleventh (last) place. They failed to qualify for the MAC tournament, as only the top eight teams qualify.

On April 6, 2023, the school announced a "change of leadership", and that head coach Heather Oesterle would not be returning as head coach, ending her four-year tenure with the team. On April 20, a month after being hired as an assistant coach for the Minnesota Lynx, former Michigan State assistant coach Kristin Haynie was named the team's new head coach.

== Roster ==
2023–24 Central Michigan Chippewas women's basketball team
Players
Coaches

Pos.	#	Name	Height	Year	Previous school	Hometown
G	1	Lisa Tesson	5 ft 7 in (1.7 m)	Jr	Royal Crown Academic School	Montreal, QC
G	2	Tamara Ortiz	5 ft 4 in (1.63 m)	Fr	Westerville South High School	Columbus, OH
C	3	Desrae Kyles	6 ft 5 in (1.96 m)	Fr	Benton Harbor High School	Benton Harbor, MI
G	4	Capria Brown	5 ft 10 in (1.78 m)	RS Jr	Schlarman Academy	Danville, IL
F	8	Madisen Wardell	6 ft 0 in (1.83 m)	So	DePaul	Detroit, MI
G	12	Karrington Gordon	6 ft 0 in (1.83 m)	Jr	Lincoln Park High School	Detroit, MI
F	13	Allison LaPoint	5 ft 10 in (1.78 m)	Jr	Shrine Catholic High School	Royal Oak, MI
G	20	Tiana Timpe	5 ft 11 in (1.8 m)	Jr	Stockton High School	Stockton, IL
G	21	Satori Griffin	5 ft 9 in (1.75 m)	Jr	Mid Michigan College	Mount Pleasant, MI
F	22	Nadège Jean	6 ft 2 in (1.88 m)	GS	DePaul	Richton Park, IL
G	24	Taylor Anderson	5 ft 10 in (1.78 m)	So	South Lyon East High School	South Lyon, MI
G	25	Lauren Walker	5 ft 7 in (1.7 m)	So	Garber High School	Essexville, MI
G	30	Brylee Borgman	5 ft 9 in (1.75 m)	Fr	Mona Shores High School	Norton Shores, MI
C	31	Rochelle Norris	6 ft 5 in (1.96 m)	Sr	Virginia Tech	Stafford, VA
G	33	Alina Anderson	5 ft 9 in (1.75 m)	So	Ferris State	Rockford, MI

Head coach

- Kristin Haynie (Michigan State)

Assistant coach(es)

- Chelsie Butler (Marquette)
- Toccara Ross (Iowa State)
- Jenna Allen (Michigan State)

Legend

- (C) Team captain
- (S) Suspended
- (I) Ineligible
- (W) Walk-on
- Injured
- Current redshirt

Roster
Last update: February 26, 2024

== Schedule and results ==
Date time, TV	Rank^{#}	Opponent^{#}	Result	Record	Site (attendance) city, state
Exhibition
October 29, 2023*; 12:00 p.m.		Davenport	W 75–61	–	McGuirk Arena (411); Mount Pleasant, MI
Non-conference regular season
November 9, 2023*; 8:00 p.m., ESPN+		at South Alabama; MAC–SBC Challenge	L 55–77	0–1	Mitchell Center (415); Mobile, AL
November 12, 2023*; 3:00 p.m., ESPN+		at Bradley	L 62–65	0–2	Renaissance Coliseum (447); Peoria, IL
November 14, 2023*; 7:00 p.m., ESPN+		Concordia Ann Arbor	W 80–57	1–2	McGuirk Arena (1,061); Mount Pleasant, MI
November 18, 2023*; 2:00 p.m., ESPN+		at Cleveland State	L 57–96	1–3	Wolstein Center (319); Cleveland, OH
November 25, 2023*; 12:00 p.m., ESPN+		at Milwaukee	L 59–84	1–4	Klotsche Center (630); Milwaukee, WI
December 2, 2023*; 1:00 p.m., ESPN+		Indiana State	L 65–73	1–5	McGuirk Arena (1,070); Mount Pleasant, MI
December 9, 2023*; 2:00 p.m., ESPN+		at Oakland	L 76–79	1–6	OU Credit Union O'rena (604); Rochester, MI
December 17, 2023*; 2:00 p.m., B1G+		at Michigan State	L 67–91	1–7	Breslin Center (4,340); East Lansing, MI
December 20, 2023*; 8:00 p.m., SLN		at North Dakota State	L 57–67	1–8	Scheels Center (608); Fargo, ND
MAC regular season
January 3, 2024; 7:00 p.m., ESPN+		Bowling Green	L 64–65	1–9 (0–1)	McGuirk Arena (970); Mount Pleasant, MI
January 6, 2024; 1:00 p.m., ESPN+		Buffalo	L 69–77	1–10 (0–2)	McGuirk Arena (1,045); Mount Pleasant, MI
January 10, 2024; 7:00 p.m., ESPN+		at Akron	L 62–70	1–11 (0–3)	James A. Rhodes Arena (649); Akron, OH
January 13, 2024; 1:00 p.m., ESPN+		at Eastern Michigan	W 64–60	2–11 (1–3)	George Gervin GameAbove Center (1,392); Ypsilanti, MI
January 17, 2024; 11:00 a.m., ESPN+		Ball State	L 47–79	2–12 (1–4)	McGuirk Arena (3,271); Mount Pleasant, MI
January 20, 2024; 2:00 p.m., ESPN+		at Northern Illinois	L 57–70	2–13 (1–5)	Convocation Center (711); DeKalb, IL
January 21, 2024*; 3:00 p.m., ESPN+		at Chicago State	W 66–55	3–13	Jones Convocation Center (130); Chicago, IL
January 24, 2024; 7:00 p.m., ESPN+		Ohio	L 58–68	3–14 (1–6)	McGuirk Arena (1,094); Mount Pleasant, MI
January 27, 2024; 1:00 p.m., ESPN+		Western Michigan	W 53–45	4–14 (2–6)	McGuirk Arena (1,302); Mount Pleasant, MI
January 31, 2024; 7:00 p.m., ESPN+		Miami (OH)	W 64–59	5–14 (3–6)	McGuirk Arena (361); Mount Pleasant, MI
February 3, 2024; 1:00 p.m., ESPN+		at Kent State	L 0–2 Forfeit	5–14 (3–7)	MAC Center; Kent, OH
February 7, 2024; 7:00 p.m., ESPN+		Toledo	L 68–93	5–15 (3–8)	McGuirk Arena (1,433); Mount Pleasant, MI
February 10, 2024*; 1:00 p.m., ESPN+		Louisiana; MAC–SBC Challenge	L 51–54	5–16	McGuirk Arena (1,260); Mount Pleasant, MI
February 17, 2024; 1:00 p.m., ESPN+		Kent State	L 54–77	5–17 (3–9)	McGuirk Arena (1,189); Mount Pleasant, MI
February 21, 2024; 6:30 p.m., ESPN+		at Ball State	L 54–78	5–18 (3–10)	Worthen Arena (1,343); Muncie, IN
February 24, 2024; 12:00 p.m., ESPN+		at Western Michigan	L 49–76	5–19 (3–11)	University Arena (1,323); Kalamazoo, MI
February 28, 2024; 7:00 p.m., ESPN+		Miami (OH)	W 76–73 ^{2OT}	6–19 (4–11)	McGuirk Arena (1,095); Mount Pleasant, MI
March 2, 2024; 1:00 p.m., ESPN+		at Ohio	L 63–77	6–20 (4–12)	Convocation Center (755); Athens, OH
March 6, 2024; 6:00 p.m., ESPN+		at Buffalo	L 68–77	6–21 (4–13)	Alumni Arena (1,841); Amherst, NY
March 9, 2024; 1:00 p.m., ESPN+		Akron	L 57–65	6–22 (4–14)	McGuirk Arena (1,081); Mount Pleasant, MI
*Non-conference game. ^{#}Rankings from AP poll. (#) Tournament seedings in parentheses. All times are in Eastern.
