= 2023–24 Buffalo Bulls women's basketball team =

American college basketball season

2023–24 Buffalo Bulls women's basketball

WNIT, first round
- Conference: Mid-American Conference
- Record: 19–14 (10–8 MAC)
- Head coach: Becky Burke (2nd season)
- Associate head coach: Jacey Brooks
- Assistant coaches: James Ewing; Erin Sinnott
- Home arena: Alumni Arena

2023–24 Mid-American Conference women's basketball standings
	Conf.				Overall
Team	W		L	PCT	W		L	PCT
Toledo	17	–	1	.944	28	–	6	.824
Ball State	16	–	2	.889	28	–	6	.824
Kent State †	13	–	5	.722	21	–	12	.636
Buffalo	10	–	8	.556	19	–	14	.576
Bowling Green	10	–	8	.556	16	–	15	.516
Northern Illinois	8	–	10	.444	15	–	16	.484
Ohio	8	–	10	.444	11	–	19	.367
Western Michigan	7	–	11	.389	12	–	18	.400
Miami (OH)	6	–	12	.333	9	–	20	.310
Akron	6	–	12	.333	11	–	18	.379
Central Michigan	4	–	14	.222	6	–	22	.214
Eastern Michigan	3	–	15	.167	7	–	22	.241
† 2024 MAC tournament winner

The 2023–24 Buffalo Bulls women's basketball team represented the University at Buffalo during the 2023–24 NCAA Division I women's basketball season. The Bulls, led by second-year head coach Becky Burke, played their home games at Alumni Arena in Amherst, New York as members of the Mid-American Conference (MAC).

The Bulls finished the season 19–14, 10–8 in MAC play, to finish in a tie for fourth place. In the MAC tournament, they were defeated by Kent State in the championship. They received an automatic bid to the WNIT, where they were defeated by Monmouth in the first round.

== Previous season ==
The Bulls finished the 2022–23 season 12–16, 7–11 in MAC play, to finish in a four-way tie for seventh place. In the MAC tournament, they were defeated by top-seeded and eventual tournament champions Toledo in the quarterfinals.

== Roster ==
2023–24 Buffalo Bulls women's basketball team
Players
Coaches

Pos.	#	Name	Height	Year	Previous school	Hometown
G	0	Jessica Wangolo	5 ft 7 in (1.7 m)	Fr	Capital Courts Academy	Ottawa, ON
G	1	Rana Elhusseini	5 ft 3 in (1.6 m)	Sr	Edinboro	Dearborn, MI
G	2	Kirsten Lewis-Williams	5 ft 10 in (1.78 m)	Fr	Lake Norman High School	Mooresville, NC
G/F	4	Ella Take	5 ft 11 in (1.8 m)	Fr	Capital Courts Academy	Kingston, ON
G	5	Sitota Gines	5 ft 10 in (1.78 m)	Jr	St. John's	Zaragoza, Spain
G	11	Briyanna Baron	5 ft 5 in (1.65 m)	GS	Nazareth Regional High School	Brooklyn, NY
G	12	Paula Lopez	5 ft 8 in (1.73 m)	Fr	Elite Sports Academy	Alicante, Spain
F	15	Ida Jonsson Ojala	6 ft 2 in (1.88 m)	Jr	Capilano	Norrköping, Sweden
G/F	20	Chryssi Gouzelou	6 ft 0 in (1.83 m)	Fr	1st High School of Voula	Athens, Greece
F	22	Kiara Johnson	6 ft 2 in (1.88 m)	GS	Towson	Buffalo, NY
G/F	23	Alexis Davis	6 ft 0 in (1.83 m)	Fr	Woodbury High School	Woodbury, NJ
G/F	33	Hattie Ogden	6 ft 2 in (1.88 m)	So	Magrath High School	Magrath, AB
C	34	Chanteese Craig	6 ft 2 in (1.88 m)	Jr	Wabash Valley College	Fort Wayne, IN
G	35	Chellia Watson	5 ft 8 in (1.73 m)	RS Sr	USC Upstate	Winder, GA

Head coach

- Becky Burke (Louisville)

Assistant coach(es)

- Jacey Brooks (Canisius)
- James Ewing (Mercyhurst)
- Erin Sinnott (Daemen)

Legend

- (C) Team captain
- (S) Suspended
- (I) Ineligible
- (W) Walk-on
- Injured
- Current redshirt

Roster
Last update: February 20, 2024

== Schedule and results ==
Date time, TV	Rank^{#}	Opponent^{#}	Result	Record	Site (attendance) city, state
Exhibition
October 28, 2023*; 2:00 p.m.		Daemen	W 58–42	–	Alumni Arena (–); Amherst, NY
Non-conference regular season
November 6, 2023*; 5:00 p.m., ESPN+		Canisius	W 69–60	1–0	Alumni Arena (1,229); Amherst, NY
November 11, 2023*; 4:00 p.m., ESPN+		at Old Dominion; MAC–SBC Challenge	L 48–59	1–1	Chartway Arena (2,024); Norfolk, VA
November 14, 2023*; 6:00 p.m., ESPN+		Niagara	W 92–75	2–1	Alumni Arena (1,376); Amherst, NY
November 17, 2023*; 6:00 p.m., ESPN+		Stonehill	W 60–39	3–1	Alumni Arena (1,276); Amherst, NY
November 22, 2023*; 1:00 p.m., ESPN+		St. Bonaventure	W 78–69	4–1	Alumni Arena (1,286); Amherst, NY
November 26, 2023*; 1:00 p.m., ESPN+		Kutztown	W 87–47	5–1	Alumni Arena (1,289); Amherst, NY
December 2, 2023*; 1:00 p.m., FloHoops		at Stony Brook	L 52–83	5–2	Island Federal Arena (712); Stony Brook, NY
December 9, 2023*; 2:00 p.m., FloHoops		at Drexel	L 57–65	5–3	Daskalakis Athletic Center (491); Philadelphia, PA
December 16, 2023*; 2:00 p.m., ESPN+		Le Moyne	L 61–66	5–4	Alumni Arena (1,365); Amherst, NY
December 30, 2023*; 12:00 p.m., ESPN+		Maryland Eastern Shore	W 70–61	6–4	Alumni Arena (1,435); Amherst, NY
MAC regular season
January 3, 2024; 6:00 p.m., ESPN+		Kent State	L 64–73	6–5 (0–1)	Alumni Arena (1,188); Amherst, NY
January 6, 2024; 1:00 p.m., ESPN+		at Central Michigan	W 77–69	7–5 (1–1)	McGuirk Arena (1,045); Mount Pleasant, MI
January 10, 2024; 6:30 p.m., ESPN+		at Ball State	L 62–67	7–6 (1–2)	Worthen Arena (1,549); Muncie, IN
January 13, 2024; 2:00 p.m., ESPN+		Akron	W 59–57	8–6 (2–2)	Alumni Arena (1,146); Amherst, NY
January 17, 2024; 7:00 p.m., ESPN+		at Northern Illinois	W 65–58	9–6 (3–2)	Convocation Center (445); DeKalb, IL
January 20, 2024; 2:00 p.m., ESPN+		Western Michigan	L 63–66	9–7 (3–3)	Alumni Arena (1,338); Amherst, NY
January 24, 2024; 11:00 a.m., ESPN+		Bowling Green	W 82–72	10–7 (4–3)	Alumni Arena (2,273); Amherst, NY
January 27, 2024; 7:00 p.m., ESPN+		at Toledo	L 63–67	10–8 (4–4)	Savage Arena (4,157); Toledo, OH
January 31, 2024; 7:00 p.m., ESPN+		at Ohio	W 81–63	11–8 (5–4)	Convocation Center (1,154); Athens, OH
February 3, 2024; 6:00 p.m., ESPN+		Eastern Michigan	W 75–63	12–8 (6–4)	Alumni Arena (1,880); Amherst, NY
February 7, 2024; 7:00 p.m., ESPN+		at Miami (OH)	W 49–43	13–8 (7–4)	Millett Hall (510); Oxford, OH
February 10, 2024*; 2:00 p.m., ESPN+		Southern Miss; MAC–SBC Challenge	W 62–46	14–8	Alumni Arena (1,756); Amherst, NY
February 17, 2024; 2:00 p.m., ESPN+		at Akron	L 54–65	14–9 (7–5)	James A. Rhodes Arena (749); Akron, OH
February 21, 2024; 6:00 p.m., ESPN+		Northern Illinois	L 57–66	14–10 (7–6)	Alumni Arena (1,740); Amherst, NY
February 24, 2024; 2:00 p.m., ESPN+		Ohio	W 67–54	15–10 (8–6)	Alumni Arena (1,866); Amherst, NY
February 28, 2024; 7:00 p.m., ESPN+		at Bowling Green	W 70–55	16–10 (9–6)	Stroh Center (1,868); Bowling Green, OH
March 2, 2024; 1:00 p.m., ESPN+		at Kent State	L 59–67	16–11 (9–7)	MAC Center (2,687); Kent, OH
March 6, 2024; 6:00 p.m., ESPN+		Central Michigan	W 77–68	17–11 (10–7)	Alumni Arena (1,841); Amherst, NY
March 9, 2024; 2:00 p.m., ESPN+		Ball State	L 50–71	17–12 (10–8)	Alumni Arena (2,371); Amherst, NY
MAC tournament
March 13, 2024; 1:30 p.m., ESPN+	(4)	vs. (5) Bowling Green; Quarterfinals	W 70–64	18–12	Rocket Mortgage FieldHouse (1,426); Cleveland, OH
March 15, 2024; 10:00 a.m., ESPN+	(4)	vs. (1) Toledo; Semifinals	W 77–74 ^{OT}	19–12	Rocket Mortgage FieldHouse; Cleveland, OH
March 16, 2024; 11:00 a.m., CBSSN	(4)	vs. (3) Kent State; Championship	L 60–78	19–13	Rocket Mortgage FieldHouse (2,292); Cleveland, OH
WBIT
March 21, 2024*; 6:00 p.m., ESPN+		Monmouth; First round	L 58–68	19–14	Alumni Arena (710); Amherst, NY
*Non-conference game. ^{#}Rankings from AP poll. (#) Tournament seedings in parentheses. All times are in Eastern.
