= 2023–24 Ohio Bobcats women's basketball team =

Intercollegiate basketball season

2023–24 Ohio Bobcats women's basketball
- Conference: Mid-American Conference
- Record: 11–19 (8–10 MAC)
- Head coach: Bob Boldon (11th season)
- Assistant coaches: Tavares Jackson; Steph Haas; Chelsea Welch
- Home arena: Convocation Center

2023–24 Mid-American Conference women's basketball standings
	Conf.				Overall
Team	W		L	PCT	W		L	PCT
Toledo	17	–	1	.944	28	–	6	.824
Ball State	16	–	2	.889	28	–	6	.824
Kent State †	13	–	5	.722	21	–	12	.636
Buffalo	10	–	8	.556	19	–	14	.576
Bowling Green	10	–	8	.556	16	–	15	.516
Northern Illinois	8	–	10	.444	15	–	16	.484
Ohio	8	–	10	.444	11	–	19	.367
Western Michigan	7	–	11	.389	12	–	18	.400
Miami (OH)	6	–	12	.333	9	–	20	.310
Akron	6	–	12	.333	11	–	18	.379
Central Michigan	4	–	14	.222	6	–	22	.214
Eastern Michigan	3	–	15	.167	7	–	22	.241
† 2024 MAC tournament winner

The 2023–24 Ohio Bobcats women's basketball team represented Ohio University during the 2023–24 NCAA Division I women's basketball season. The Bobcats, led by eleventh-year head coach Bob Boldon, played their home games at the Convocation Center in Athens, Ohio as a member of the Mid-American Conference. They finished the regular season 11–18, 8–10 in MAC play, to finish tied for 6th place. They lost to Ball State in the first round of the MAC tournament.

== Previous season ==
They finished 6–23 and 4–14 in the MAC play to finish tied for eleventh in the MAC. They failed to qualify for the MAC tournament.

== Offseason ==
=== Departures ===
Departures
Name	Number	Pos.	Height	Year	Hometown	Reason
Caitlyn Kroll	5	G	5'10"	RS-Senior	Bridgeport, OH	Graduated, exhausted eligibility
Abby Garnett	20	F	6'1"	RS-Junior	Golden, CO	Graduated
Alexandra Antonova	35	F	6'2"	RS-Junior	Moscow, Russia	Graduated
Jasmine Hale	23	G	5'9"	RS-Junior	Cincinnati, OH	Graduated
Ella Pope	4	F	5'11"	RS-Sophomore	Orem, UT	Left team for personal reasons
Kendall Hale	22	G	5'11"	Sophomore	Cincinnati, OH	Left team for personal reasons
Yaya Felder	2	G	5'11"	Sophomore	Hartford, CT	Transferred to Baylor

=== Incoming transfers ===
Incoming transfers
Name	Number	Pos.	Height	Year	Hometown	Reason
Kennedi Watkins	5	G	5'10"	Junior	Ballwin, MO	Transferred from Southeast Missouri State. Will have two years of eligibility remaining.
Bengisu Alper	33	G	5'11"	Senior	Istanbul, Turkey	Transferred from Northwestern State. Will have one year of eligibility remaining.

=== 2023 recruiting class ===
Recruiting class
Name	Number	Pos.	Height	High school	Hometown
Aylasia Fantroy	2	G	5'11"	Palestine	Palestine, TX
Monica Williams	12	G	5'9"	Lawrence North	Indianapolis, IN
Bailey Tabeling	21	G	5'10"	Trinity Lutheran	Seymour, IN
Asiah Baxter	22	G	5'11"	Warren Central	Indianapolis, IN
Emma Barnett	34	F	6'1"	Mercy Academy	Mount Washington, KY

== Preseason ==
Prior to the season Ohio was picked ninth in the MAC preseason poll. No Bobcats were named to the preseason All-MAC team.

=== Preseason rankings ===
MAC preseason poll
Predicted finish	Team	Votes (1st place)
1	Toledo	121 (11)
2	Ball State	110 (1)
3	Kent State	102
4	Bowling Green	77
5	Northern Illinois	99
6	Akron	69
7	Eastern Michigan	66
8	Buffalo	50
9	Ohio	40
10	Western Michigan	38
11	Central Michigan	24
12	Miami	23

MAC tournament champion: Toledo (10), Ball State (2)

== Roster ==
2023–24 Ohio Bobcats women's basketball team
Players
Coaches

Pos.	#	Name	Height	Year	Previous school	Hometown
G	11	Peyton Guice	5 ft 11 in (1.8 m)	Sr	Westerville South	Westerville, OH
G	3	Madi Mace	5 ft 11 in (1.8 m)	RS Jr	Parkersburg	Parkersburg, WV
G	14	Kate Dennis	6 ft 1 in (1.85 m)	Jr	Guilford	Rockford, IL
G	10	Kailah Johnson	5 ft 8 in (1.73 m)	Sr	Notre Dame Academy	Holland, OH
G	0	Jaya McClure	5 ft 6 in (1.68 m)	So	Christian Academy	Louisville, KY
F	24	Aja Austin	6 ft 1 in (1.85 m)	Jr		Westerville, OH
F	41	Cassidy Lafler	5 ft 11 in (1.8 m)	So	Dublin Coffman	Dublin, OH
G	2	Aylasia Fantroy	5 ft 11 in (1.8 m)	Fr	Palestine	Palestine, TX
G	12	Monica Williams	5 ft 9 in (1.75 m)	Fr	Lawrence North	Indianapolis, IN
G	21	Bailey Tabeling	5 ft 11 in (1.8 m)	Fr	Trinity Lutheran	Seymour, IN
G	22	Asiah Baxter	5 ft 11 in (1.8 m)	Fr	Warren Central	Indianapolis, IN
F	34	Emma Barnett	6 ft 1 in (1.85 m)	Fr	Mercy Academy	Mount Washington, KY
G	5	Kennedi Watkins	5 ft 10 in (1.78 m)	Jr	Marquette	Ballwin, MO
G	33	Bengisu Alper	5 ft 11 in (1.8 m)	Sr	Doga Anataolian	Istanbul, Turkey

Head coach

- Bob Boldon (Walsh)

Assistant coach(es)

- Tavares Jackson (Minnesota)
- Steph Haas (Florida Gulf Coast)
- Chelsea Welch (Wright State)

Legend

- (C) Team captain
- (S) Suspended
- (I) Ineligible
- (W) Walk-on
- Injured
- Current redshirt

Roster
Last update: October 2, 2023

=== Support staff ===
2023–24 Ohio Bobcats support staff
- Ebony Pegues – Director of Basketball Operations
- Kaylee Gregory Bambule – Video Coordinator
- Tyler Johnson – Graduate Assistant
- Ben Gilkey – Assistant Strength and Conditioning Coach
- Becca Gaddy – Director of Athletics Communications (Volleyball, Women's Basketball, Cross Country/Track & Field, Baseball)
- Morgan Hall – Staff Athletic Trainer
- Jessica Arquette – Ohio Athletics Sports Dietitian
- Kaitlyn Michener – Nutritionist
- Hannah Rastatter – Nutritionist

== Schedule ==
Date time, TV	Rank^{#}	Opponent^{#}	Result	Record	High points	High rebounds	High assists	Site (attendance) city, state
Exhibition
November 1, 2023*; 7:00 p.m.		Marietta	W 92–62	–	17 – Williams	11 – Fantroy	3 – Fantroy	Convocation Center (804); Athens, OH
Non-conference regular season
November 11, 2023*; 2:00 p.m., ESPN+		at Appalachian State; MAC-SBC Challenge	L 64–71	0–1	10 – Alper	7 – Mace	3 – Tied	Holmes Center (575); Boone, NC
November 16, 2023*; 7:00 p.m., ESPN+		Dayton	W 67–61	1–1	18 – McClure	5 – Tied	4 – McClure	Convocation Center (704); Athens, OH
November 22, 2023*; TBA, ESPN+		at Morehead State	L 60–89	1–2	11 – Lafler	6 – Fantroy	3 – Fantroy	Ellis Johnson Arena (621); Morehead, KY
November 26, 2023*; 1:00 p.m., ESPN+		IUPUI	W 75–71	2–2	21 – McClure	6 – Tied	5 – Tied	Convocation Center (490); Athens, OH
November 29, 2023*; 7:00 p.m., ESPN+		Longwood	L 72–75	2–3	16 – Watkins	5 – Tied	5 – Mace	Convocation Center (618); Athens, OH
December 5, 2023*; 7:00 p.m., BTN+		at No. 12 Ohio State	L 45–85	2–4	9 – McClure	6 – Alper	3 – McClure	Value City Arena (4,950); Columbus, OH
December 9, 2023*; 1:00 p.m., ESPN+		Syracuse	L 62–82	2–5	23 – Tabeling	6 – McClure	9 – McClure	Convocation Center; Athens, OH
December 17, 2023*; 1:00 p.m., ESPN+		Indiana State	W 65–62	3–5	21 – McClure	11 – Fantroy	4 – Williams	Convocation Center (355); Athens, OH
December 21, 2023*; 1:00 p.m., YouTube		at Butler	L 49–69	3–6	13 – McClure	6 – Watkins	3 – McClure	Hinkle Fieldhouse (1,038); Indianapolis, IN
December 30, 2023*; 1:00 p.m., ESPN+		at Bellarmine	L 66–70	3–7	21 – McClure	6 – Tied	6 – McClure	Freedom Hall (572); Louisville, KY
MAC regular season
January 3, 2024; 7:00 p.m., ESPN+		Akron	W 67–58	4–7 (1–0)	17 – Tied	6 – Tied	3 – Williams	Convocation Center (308); Athens, OH
January 6, 2024; 1:00 p.m., ESPN+		at Kent State	L 63–92	4–8 (1–1)	16 – Mace	5 – Watkins	4 – Williams	MAC Center (820); Kent, OH
January 10, 2024; 7:00 p.m., ESPN+		Northern Illinois	L 62–67	4–9 (1–2)	12 – Watkins	7 – Alper	4 – Guice	Convocation Center (577); Athens, OH
January 13, 2024; 2:00 p.m., ESPN+		at Toledo	L 50–63	4–10 (1–3)	21 – Watkins	6 – Alper	2 – Tied	Savage Arena (4,116); Toledo, OH
January 17, 2024; 7:00 p.m., ESPN+		at Western Michigan	L 55–73	4–11 (1–4)	18 – Watkins	6 – Fantroy	– Williams	University Arena (699); Kalamazoo, MI
January 20, 2024; 1:00 p.m., ESPN+		Eastern Michigan	W 72–62	5–11 (2–4)	14 – Tied	8 – Williams	7 – Mace	Convocation Center; Athens, OH
January 24, 2024; 7:00 p.m., ESPN+		at Central Michigan	W 68–58	6–11 (3–4)	14 – Williams	4 – Watkins	4 – Tied	McGuirk Arena (1,094); Mount Pleasant, MI
January 27, 2024; 1:00 p.m., ESPN+		Miami (OH)	W 71–55	7–11 (4–4)	18 – Tebeling	7 – Tabeling	4 – Williams	Convocation Center (741); Athens, OH
January 31, 2024; 7:00 p.m., ESPN+		Buffalo	L 63–81	7–12 (4–5)	13 – Tied	7 – Tied	4 – Williams	Convocation Center (1,154); Athens, OH
February 3, 2024; 1:00 p.m., ESPN+		at Ball State	L 66–97	7–13 (4–6)	19 – Fantroy	7 – Fantroy	3 – Tied	Worthen Arena (1,556); Muncie, IN
February 7, 2024; 7:00 p.m., ESPN+		at Bowling Green	L 52–69	7–14 (4–7)	22 – Tabeling	4 – Tied	3 – Tabeling	Stroh Center (2,151); Bowling Green, OH
February 10, 2024*; 1:00 p.m., ESPN+		Texas State; MAC-SBC Challenge	L 71–80	7–15	24 – Fantroy	6 – Tied	4 – McClure	Convocation Center (619); Athens, OH
February 17, 2024; 1:00 p.m., ESPN+		Ball State	L 60–75	7–16 (4–8)	21 – Watkins	6 – Guice	3 – Tabeling	Convocation Center (880); Athens, OH
February 21, 2024; 7:00 p.m., ESPN+		Kent State	W 79–77	8–16 (5–8)	26 – McClure	7 – McClure	4 – Williams	Convocation Center (567); Athens, OH
February 24, 2024; 2:00 p.m., ESPN+		at Buffalo	L 54–67	8–17 (5–9)	13 – McClure	7 – Fantroy	3 – Tied	Alumni Arena (1866); Amherst, NY
February 28, 2024; 7:00 p.m., ESPN+		Western Michigan	W 67–64	9–17 (6–9)	14 – Fantroy	6 – Williams	8 – McClure	Convocation Center (680); Athens, OH
March 2, 2024; 5:00 p.m., ESPN+		Central Michigan	W 77–63	10–17 (7–9)	19 – McClure	7 – McClure	5 – McClure	Convocation Center (755); Athens, OH
March 6, 2024; 6:00 p.m., ESPN+		at Akron	W 72–63	11–17 (8–9)	24 – Watkins	6 – Alper	3 – McClure	James A. Rhodes Arena (321); Akron, OH
March 9, 2024; 1:00 p.m., ESPN+		at Miami (OH)	L 64–68	11–18 (8–10)	14 – Watkins	6 – Watkins	3 – Tied	Millett Hall (649); Oxford, OH
MAC Tournament
March 13, 2024; 4:00 p.m., ESPN+	(7)	vs. (2) Ball State; Quarterfinals	L 53–77	11–19	18 – Fantroy	5 – Williams	1 – Tied	Rocket Mortgage FieldHouse; Cleveland, OH
*Non-conference game. ^{#}Rankings from AP poll. (#) Tournament seedings in parentheses. All times are in Eastern Time.

== Awards and honors ==
=== All-MAC Awards ===
Postseason All-MAC teams
Team	Player	Position	Year
All-MAC Honorable Mention	Jaya McClure	G	So.
All-MAC Honorable Mention	Kennedi Watkins	G	Jr.
All-MAC Freshman Team	Bailey Tabeling	G	Fr.
