= Ryan Gensler =

American basketball player and coach

Current position
- Title: Head coach
- Team: Akron
- Conference: MAC
- Record: 27–62 (.303)

Biographical details
- Born: April 3, 1987 (age 39)
- Education: Saint Joseph's University

Coaching career (HC unless noted)
- 2009–2011: Providence (GA)
- 2011–2013: St. Bonaventure (asst.)
- 2013–2015: Loyola (MD) (asst.)
- 2015–2017: Florida (Video Coord.)
- 2017–2022: Dayton (asst.)
- 2022–2023: Illinois (asst.)
- 2023–present: Akron

Head coaching record
- Overall: 20–38 (.303)

Ryan Gensler (born April 3, 1987) is an American women's basketball coach. He is currently the women's basketball head coach at the University of Akron.

== Early life and education ==
Gensler is a native of Syracuse, New York. He attended high school at Christian Brothers Academy where he played basketball and football. He received a bachelor's degree in political science with a minor in business from Saint Joseph's University in 2009. He earned a master's degree in education from Providence College while working as a graduate assistant and director of basketball operations for the women's basketball team.

== Coaching career ==
He served as an assistant coach on the women's basketball staff at St. Bonaventure and Loyola (MD) before taking a position as video coordinator at Florida. He returned to the Atlantic 10 in 2017 as an assistant coach at Dayton under head coach Shauna Green, with whom he had worked at Providence while she was an assistant. He moved with Green to Illinois in 2022 when she accepted the head coaching position there.

=== Akron ===
On March 29, 2023, he accepted the position as the head coach of the women's basketball team at the University of Akron.

== Head coaching record ==
Record table
Season	Team	Overall	Conference	Standing	Postseason
Akron (Mid-American Conference) (2023–present)
2023–24	Akron	11–18	6–12	T–9th	
2024–25	Akron	9–20	3–13	T–10th	
2025–26	Akron	7–24	4–14	T–11th	
Akron:		27–62 (.303)	13–39 (.250)		
Total:		27–62 (.303)			
National champion Postseason invitational champion Conference regular season champion Conference regular season and conference tournament champion Division regular season champion Division regular season and conference tournament champion Conference tournament champion

== Personal life ==
He and his wife, Leanna, have two sons.
