= Todd Starkey =

American basketball coach

Current position
- Title: Associate Head Coach
- Team: Arizona
- Conference: Big 12

Biographical details
- Born: June 5, 1971 (age 55)
- Education: Montreat (1993)

Playing career
- ?: Mars Hill
- ?: Montreat

Coaching career (HC unless noted)

Men's basketball
- 1998–2003: Montreat (assistant)
- 2003–2005: Lenoir–Rhyne (assistant)

Women's basketball
- 2005–2014: Lenoir–Rhyne
- 2014–2016: Indiana (assistant)
- 2016–2026: Kent State
- 2026–present: Arizona (AHC)

Head coaching record
- Tournaments: 0–1 (NCAA Division I); 1–2 (WNIT); 1–4 (NCAA Division II)

Accomplishments and honors

Championships
- MAC Tournament (2024); 2 MAC East Division (2017, 2020); 3 South Atlantic regular season (2009, 2010, 2013); South Atlantic Conference Tournament (2009)

Awards
- WBCA Division II National Coach of the Year (2009); MAC Coach of the Year (2017); 4× South Atlantic Coach of the Year (2009–2011, 2014)

Todd Starkey (born June 5, 1971) is an American basketball coach who is currently the associate head coach at the University of Arizona. He was previously the head women's basketball coach at Kent State University.

== Career ==
He was previously an assistant coach at Indiana University Bloomington and was also the head women's basketball coach at Lenoir–Rhyne University from 2005 to 2014, where he won a national coach of the year award in 2009.

== Head coaching record ==
Record table
Season	Team	Overall	Conference	Standing	Postseason
Lenoir–Rhyne Bears (South Atlantic Conference) (2005–2014)
2005–06	Lenoir–Rhyne	10–18	3–11	7th	
2006–07	Lenoir–Rhyne	16–12	9–7	T–4th	
2007–08	Lenoir–Rhyne	15–13	5–9	5th	
2008–09	Lenoir–Rhyne	27–5	13–3	T–1st	NCAA Division II Round of 32
2009–10	Lenoir–Rhyne	21–8	13–3	1st	NCAA Division II Round of 64
2010–11	Lenoir–Rhyne	14–13	11–7	T–3rd	
2011–12	Lenoir–Rhyne	19–9	11–7	3rd	
2012–13	Lenoir–Rhyne	19–10	13–5	2nd	NCAA Division II Round of 64
2013–14	Lenoir–Rhyne	24–7	17–5	T–1st	NCAA Division II Round of 64
Lenoir–Rhyne:		165–95 (.635)	95–57 (.625)		
Kent State Golden Flashes (Mid-American Conference) (2016–2026)
2016–17	Kent State	19–13	13–5	1st (East)	WNIT first round
2017–18	Kent State	13–19	5–13	4th (East)	
2018–19	Kent State	20–13	11–7	4th (East)	WNIT second round
2019–20	Kent State	19–11	11–7	T–1st (East)	Postseason not held (Note: Season not played past March 11 due to the COVID-19 pandemic)
2020–21	Kent State	11–9	10–6	5th	
2021–22	Kent State	19–12	10–10	T–6th	WNIT second round
2022–23	Kent State	21–11	12–6	4th	WNIT first round
2023–24	Kent State	21–11	13–5	3rd	NCAA Division I First Round
2024–25	Kent State	21–12	12–6	4th	
2025–26	Kent State	15–16	9–9	T–6th	
Kent State:		179–127 (.585)	106–74 (.589)		
Total:		344–222 (.608)			
National champion Postseason invitational champion Conference regular season champion Conference regular season and conference tournament champion Division regular season champion Division regular season and conference tournament champion Conference tournament champion

== Personal life ==
Starkey's son Drew Starkey is an actor.
