= 2023–24 USC Upstate Spartans women's basketball team =

American college basketball season

2023–24 USC Upstate Spartans women's basketball

WNIT, first round
- Conference: Big South Conference
- Record: 16–16 (10–6 Big South)
- Head coach: Jason Williams (2nd season)
- Associate head coach: Steven Rhodes
- Assistant coaches: Jennifer DeGraaf; Haley Horstman
- Home arena: G. B. Hodge Center

2023–24 Big South women's basketball standings
	Conf.				Overall
Team	W		L	PCT	W		L	PCT
High Point	14	–	2	.875	20	–	12	.625
USC Upstate	10	–	6	.625	16	–	16	.500
Radford	9	–	7	.563	15	–	18	.455
Charleston Southern	8	–	8	.500	11	–	19	.367
Presbyterian †	8	–	8	.500	21	–	15	.583
Winthrop	8	–	8	.500	14	–	16	.467
Longwood	6	–	10	.375	9	–	21	.300
Gardner–Webb	5	–	11	.313	6	–	24	.200
UNC Asheville	4	–	12	.250	11	–	20	.355
† 2024 Big South tournament winner

The 2023–24 USC Upstate Spartans women's basketball team represented the University of South Carolina Upstate during the 2023–24 NCAA Division I women's basketball season. The Spartans, led by second-year head coach Jason Williams, played their home games at the G. B. Hodge Center in Spartanburg, South Carolina as members of the Big South Conference.

The Spartans finished the 2023–24 season 16–16, 10–6 in Big South play, to finish in second place. They defeated Longwood before falling to Radford in the semifinals of the Big South tournament. They received an automatic bid into the WNIT, where they fell to Charleston in the first round.

== Previous season ==
The Spartans finished the 2022–23 season 11–20, 7–11 in Big South play, to finish in a tie for seventh place. As the #7 seed in the Big South tournament, they defeated #10 seed Charleston Southern in the first round before falling to #2 seed High Point in the quarterfinals.

== Roster ==
2023–24 USC Upstate Spartans women's basketball team
Players
Coaches

Pos.	#	Name	Height	Year	Previous school	Hometown
G	0	Zora Fray-Chinn	5 ft 11 in (1.8 m)	RS So	Wright State	Orlando, FL
PG	1	Jeni Levine	5 ft 6 in (1.68 m)	So	Staunton River High School	Vinton, VA
G	2	Macy Wike	5 ft 9 in (1.75 m)	Fr	Asheville Christian Academy	Cullowhee, NC
G	3	Dakota Reeves	5 ft 7 in (1.7 m)	GS	Charleston	Cincinnati, OH
PG	11	Isabell West	6 ft 0 in (1.83 m)	GS	Iowa Wesleyan	Shakopee, MN
G	12	Cali Levine	5 ft 6 in (1.68 m)	So	Staunton River High School	Vinton, VA
PG	14	Trinity Johnson	5 ft 7 in (1.7 m)	GS	Presbyterian	Hopkins, SC
F	21	Rebekah Gordon	6 ft 1 in (1.85 m)	Jr	Central Michigan	New Boston, IN
G	22	Gracie Barnes	5 ft 9 in (1.75 m)	Fr	Cincinnati Country Day School	Cincinnati, Ohio
G	25	Cassie Gallagher	5 ft 11 in (1.8 m)	Fr	Cookeville High School	Cookeville, TN
F	33	AC Markham	5 ft 10 in (1.78 m)	Jr	Providence Christian Academy	Murfreesboro, TN
F	34	Vera Soderblom	6 ft 0 in (1.83 m)	So	Lulea Gymnasieskola	Gothenburg, Sweden
G	42	Emma Blair	6 ft 2 in (1.88 m)	Fr	Greater Latrobe High School	Latrobe, PA

Head coach

- Jason Williams (Greensboro)

Assistant coach(es)

- Steven Rhodes (UNC Wilmington)
- Jennifer DeGraaf (UNC Wilmington)
- Haley Horstman (Findlay)

Legend

- (C) Team captain
- (S) Suspended
- (I) Ineligible
- (W) Walk-on
- Injured
- Current redshirt

Roster
Last update: January 6, 2024

== Schedule and results ==
Date time, TV	Rank^{#}	Opponent^{#}	Result	Record	High points	High rebounds	High assists	Site (attendance) city, state
Non-conference regular season
November 7, 2023*; 7:00 p.m., ESPN+		at Davidson	L 51–86	0–1	7 – 2 tied	4 – 2 tied	5 – Johnson	John M. Belk Arena (264); Davidson, NC
November 9, 2023*; 6:00 p.m., ESPN+		at East Carolina	L 35–105	0–2	10 – West	6 – West	3 – Johnson	Williams Arena (1,353); Greenville, NC
November 11, 2023*; 6:00 p.m., SECN+		at Kentucky	L 54–82	0–3	18 – Reeves	5 – Markham	9 – Johnson	Rupp Arena (1,465); Lexington, KY
November 14, 2023*; 7:00 p.m., ESPN+		Lees–McRae College	W 72–44	1–3	21 – West	7 – West	5 – Markham	G. B. Hodge Center (256); Spartanburg, SC
November 17, 2023*; 12:00 p.m., ESPN+		at Queens	L 51–61	1–4	12 – Gordon	8 – 2 tied	6 – Johnson	Curry Arena (86); Charlotte, NC
November 20, 2023*; 7:00 p.m., ESPN+		South Carolina State	W 58–53	2–4	10 – 2 tied	9 – Markham	8 – Johnson	G. B. Hodge Center (235); Spartanburg, SC
November 24, 2023*; 2:00 p.m.		vs. Detroit Mercy; GATA Turkey Throwdown	L 64–71	2–5	18 – West	10 – Markham	5 – Johnson	Hanner Fieldhouse (100); Statesboro, GA
November 25, 2023*; 2:00 p.m.		vs. North Florida; GATA Turkey Throwdown	W 73–60	3–5	18 – Gordon	8 – 2 tied	6 – Johnson	Hanner Fieldhouse (100); Statesboro, GA
November 30, 2023*; 5:30 p.m., ESPN+		at Samford	L 52–57	3–6	15 – Johnson	7 – West	7 – Johnson	Pete Hanna Center (471); Homewood, AL
December 5, 2023*; 11:30 a.m., ESPN+		at Western Carolina	W 73–64	4–6	29 – West	10 – Markham	3 – Markham	Ramsey Center (1,291); Cullowhee, NC
December 9, 2023*; 4:30 p.m., ESPN+		Furman	W 61–58	5–6	17 – Johnson	7 – Gordon	5 – Johnson	G. B. Hodge Center (259); Spartanburg, SC
December 18, 2023*; 11:00 a.m., ESPN+		UNC Greensboro	L 53–56	5–7	13 – 2 tied	8 – West	4 – Markham	G. B. Hodge Center (818); Spartanburg, SC
December 20, 2023*; 2:00 p.m., ACCNX		at Georgia Tech	L 50–81	5–8	12 – West	8 – 2 tied	3 – Fray-Chinn	McCamish Pavilion (1,244); Atlanta, GA
Big South regular season
January 3, 2024; 7:00 p.m., ESPN+		UNC Asheville; Ingles I-26 Rivalry	W 71–44	6–8 (1–0)	18 – J. Levine	9 – West	3 – Johnson	G. B. Hodge Center (212); Spartanburg, SC
January 6, 2024; 2:00 p.m., ESPN+		at Winthrop	W 52–51	7–8 (2–0)	15 – Johnson	9 – West	2 – 2 tied	Winthrop Coliseum (145); Rock Hill, SC
January 13, 2024; 4:00 p.m., ESPN+		Charleston Southern	W 59–58	8–8 (3–0)	16 – Gordon	8 – Gordon	4 – Markham	G. B. Hodge Center (287); Spartanburg, SC
January 17, 2024; 7:00 p.m., ESPN+		at Longwood	L 58–66	8–9 (3–1)	12 – 2 tied	10 – Gordon	5 – Johnson	Joan Perry Brock Center (907); Farmville, VA
January 20, 2024; 4:00 p.m., ESPN+		Radford	W 65–60	9–9 (4–1)	22 – West	10 – West	3 – Johnson	G. B. Hodge Center (377); Spartanburg, SC
January 24, 2024; 7:00 p.m., ESPN+		at High Point	W 59–49	10–9 (4–2)	14 – Johnson	7 – Markham	6 – Johnson	Qubein Center (862); High Point, NC
January 27, 2024; 1:00 p.m., ESPN+		at Gardner–Webb	W 78–59	11–9 (5–2)	13 – Levine	11 – Markham	3 – Johnson	Paul Porter Arena (509); Boiling Springs, NC
January 31, 2024; 7:00 p.m., ESPN+		Presbyterian	W 62–58	12–9 (6–2)	13 – Levine	7 – Fray-Chinn	8 – Johnson	G. B. Hodge Center (215); Spartanburg, SC
February 3, 2024; 2:00 p.m., ESPN+		at Radford	L 61–67 ^{OT}	12–10 (6–3)	14 – 2 tied	14 – West	7 – Johnson	Dedmon Center (804); Radford, VA
February 7, 2024; 7:00 p.m., ESPN+		Longwood	W 49–45	13–10 (7–3)	11 – Gordon	9 – West	5 – Johnson	G. B. Hodge Center (315); Spartanburg, SC
February 10, 2024; 1:00 p.m., ESPN+		at UNC Asheville; Ingles I-26 Rivalry	W 71–65	14–10 (8–3)	20 – Johnson	4 – 2 tied	6 – Johnson	Kimmel Arena (276); Asheville, NC
February 14, 2024; 7:00 p.m., ESPN+		High Point	L 50–53	14–11 (8–4)	22 – Johnson	7 – West	4 – 2 tied	G. B. Hodge Center (293); Spartanburg, SC
February 17, 2024; 2:00 p.m., ESPN+		Gardner–Webb	W 73–56	15–11 (9–4)	18 – Gordon	9 – West	6 – Johnson	G. B. Hodge Center; Spartanburg, SC
February 21, 2024; 6:00 p.m., ESPN+		at Charleston Southern	L 59–66	15–12 (9–5)	12 – Markham	9 – West	4 – Johnson	Buccaneer Field House (221); North Charleston, SC
February 24, 2024; 4:00 p.m., ESPN+		Winthrop	L 61–67	15–13 (9–6)	18 – Johnson	7 – West	6 – Johnson	G. B. Hodge Center (285); Spartanburg, SC
February 28, 2024; 6:30 p.m., ESPN+		at Presbyterian	L 43–47	15–14 (10–6)	13 – Levine	9 – West	4 – Johnson	Templeton Physical Education Center (406); Clinton, SC
Big South tournament
March 7, 2024; 6:00 p.m., ESPN+	(2)	vs. (7) Longwood; Quarterfinals	W 60-37	16-14	15 – Reeves	10 – 2 tied	10 – Johnson	Qubein Center; High Point, NC
March 9, 2024; 8:00 p.m., ESPN+	(2)	vs. (3) Radford; Semifinals	L 45-61	16-15	16 – Johnson	7 – Levine	3 – Johnson	Qubein Center (1,528); High Point, NC
WNIT
March 21, 2024*; 7:00 p.m., ESPN+		Charleston; First round	L 60-78	16-16	15 – Reeves	9 – West	5 – Johnson	G. B. Hodge Center (404); Spartanburg, SC
*Non-conference game. ^{#}Rankings from AP poll. (#) Tournament seedings in parentheses. All times are in Eastern.
