= 2023–24 High Point Panthers women's basketball team =

American college basketball season

2023–24 High Point Panthers women's basketball

Big South regular season champions

WBIT, first round
- Conference: Big South Conference
- Record: 20–12 (14–2 Big South)
- Head coach: Chelsea Banbury (5th season)
- Assistant coaches: Brittany Brown; Katie Clayman; Brendan Quinlan-Huertas; Jordan Edwards
- Home arena: Qubein Center

2023–24 Big South women's basketball standings
| | Conf. | | | | Overall |
| Team | W | | L | PCT | W | | L | PCT |
|---|---|---|---|---|---|---|---|---|
| High Point | 14 | – | 2 | .875 | 20 | – | 12 | .625 |
| USC Upstate | 10 | – | 6 | .625 | 16 | – | 16 | .500 |
| Radford | 9 | – | 7 | .563 | 15 | – | 18 | .455 |
| Charleston Southern | 8 | – | 8 | .500 | 11 | – | 19 | .367 |
| Presbyterian † | 8 | – | 8 | .500 | 21 | – | 15 | .583 |
| Winthrop | 8 | – | 8 | .500 | 14 | – | 16 | .467 |
| Longwood | 6 | – | 10 | .375 | 9 | – | 21 | .300 |
| Gardner–Webb | 5 | – | 11 | .313 | 6 | – | 24 | .200 |
| UNC Asheville | 4 | – | 12 | .250 | 11 | – | 20 | .355 |
† 2024 Big South tournament winner

The 2023–24 High Point Panthers women's basketball team represented High Point University during the 2023–24 NCAA Division I women's basketball season. The Panthers, led by fifth-year head coach Chelsea Banbury, played their home games at the Qubein Center in High Point, North Carolina as members of the Big South Conference.

== Previous season ==
The Panthers finished the 2022–23 season 17–15, 13–5 in Big South play, to finish in second place. As the #2 seed in the Big South tournament, they defeated #7 seed USC Upstate in the quarterfinals, and #3 seed Campbell in the semifinals, before falling to top-seeded Gardner–Webb in the championship game. They received an at-large bid into the WNIT, where they lost to Clemson in the first round.

== Roster ==
2023–24 High Point Panthers women's basketball team
Players
Coaches

| Pos. | # | Name | Height | Year | Previous school | Hometown |
|---|---|---|---|---|---|---|
| G | 0 | Bukky Akinsola | 5 ft 6 in (1.68 m) | Jr | Moberly Area Community College | Hillside, NJ |
| G | 1 | Faith Price | 5 ft 7 in (1.7 m) | GS | UNC Greensboro | Jamestown, NC |
| G | 2 | Nakyah Terrell | 5 ft 6 in (1.68 m) | Jr | Canton McKinley High School | Canton, OH |
| F | 3 | Nevaeh Zavala | 6 ft 0 in (1.83 m) | So | Royse City High School | Plano, TX |
| G | 4 | Cydney Johnson | 5 ft 11 in (1.8 m) | RS Sr | Heritage High School | Raleigh, NC |
| G | 5 | Claire Wyatt | 6 ft 1 in (1.85 m) | Sr | Farragut High School | Knoxville, TN |
| G | 10 | Callie Scheier | 5 ft 2 in (1.57 m) | GS | West Forsyth High School | Clemmons, NC |
| G | 11 | Mack Maier | 5 ft 9 in (1.75 m) | GS | Wake Forest | Parker, CO |
| G | 12 | Lauren Bevis | 5 ft 5 in (1.65 m) | GS | Gardner–Webb | Spartanburg, SC |
| G | 14 | Anna Häger | 6 ft 0 in (1.83 m) | So | Lulea Gymnasieskola | Gothenburg, Sweden |
| C | 15 | Amaria McNear | 6 ft 3 in (1.91 m) | RS Sr | Westridge Academy | Kernersville, NC |
| G | 21 | Emma Larios | 5 ft 7 in (1.7 m) | Fr | Asheville Christian Academy | Asheville, NC |
| G | 22 | Shakira Baskerville | 6 ft 1 in (1.85 m) | Jr | West Forsyth High School | Clemmons, NC |
| G | 25 | Aaliyah Collins | 5 ft 6 in (1.68 m) | Jr | Grand Canyon | Snohomish, WA |
| F | 33 | Peyton Gerdes | 6 ft 0 in (1.83 m) | Fr | Grayslake North High School | Lake Villa, IL |

Head coach

- Chelsea Banbury (Florida Gulf Coast)

Assistant coach(es)

- Brittany Brown (Florida Gulf Coast)
- Katie Clayman (Oregon)
- Brendan Quinlan-Huertas (High Point)
- Jordan Edwards (High Point)

Legend

- (C) Team captain
- (S) Suspended
- (I) Ineligible
- (W) Walk-on
- Injured
- Current redshirt

Roster
Last update: January 9, 2024

== Schedule and results ==
| Date time, TV | Rank^{#} | Opponent^{#} | Result | Record | High points | High rebounds | High assists | Site (attendance) city, state |
Exhibition
| November 3, 2023*; 8:00 p.m. | | Barton | W 99–44 | – | 27 – Bevis | 8 – 2 tied | 9 – Terrell | Qubein Center (872); High Point, NC |
Non-conference regular season
| November 6, 2023*; 5:00 p.m., ACCN | | at No. 8 Virginia Tech | L 55–94 | 0–1 | 15 – 2 tied | 5 – Baskerville | 2 – 2 tied | Cassell Coliseum (6,113); Blacksburg, VA |
| November 11, 2023*; 2:00 p.m., ESPN+ | | Lees–McRae | W 99–47 | 1–1 | 26 – Bevis | 6 – 2 tied | 7 – Scheier | Qubein Center (1,360); High Point, NC |
| November 14, 2023*; 7:00 p.m., ESPN+ | | Stetson | W 59–54 | 2–1 | 14 – Bevis | 7 – Bevis | 5 – Akinsola | Qubein Center (1,360); High Point, NC |
| November 17, 2023*; 7:00 p.m., ESPN+ | | Wofford | W 80–64 | 3–1 | 21 – Bevis | 14 – McNear | 7 – Scheier | Qubein Center (937); High Point, NC |
| November 23, 2023*; 5:45 p.m., ESPN+ | | vs. South Florida; Paradise Jam Reef Division | L 32–61 | 3–2 | 12 – Bevis | 5 – Akinsola | 2 – Scheier | Sports and Fitness Center (1,224); St. Thomas, USVI |
| November 24, 2023*; 8:00 p.m., ESPN+ | | vs. No. 12 Texas; Paradise Jam Reef Division | L 39–101 | 3–3 | 10 – 2 tied | 4 – Scheier | 2 – Terrell | Sports and Fitness Center (1,824); St. Thomas, USVI |
| November 25, 2023*; 5:45 p.m., ESPN+ | | vs. Arizona State; Paradise Jam Reef Division | L 69–77 | 3–4 | 16 – Häger | 6 – Häger | 3 – Häger | Sports and Fitness Center; St. Thomas, USVI |
| November 30, 2023*; 7:00 p.m., ESPN+ | | Johnson C. Smith | W 61–50 | 4–4 | 15 – Terrell | 9 – Terrell | 3 – 2 tied | Qubein Center (719); High Point, NC |
| December 5, 2023*; 8:30 p.m., MWN | | at Colorado State | L 61–93 | 4–5 | 19 – Bevis | 5 – Häger | 2 – 2 tied | Moby Arena (1,320); Fort Collins, CO |
| December 8, 2023*; 7:00 p.m., ESPN+ | | at Davidson | L 40–77 | 4–6 | 13 – Häger | 7 – Terrell | 4 – Terrell | John M. Belk Arena (362); Davidson, NC |
| December 18, 2023*; 7:00 p.m., ESPN+ | | Norfolk State | L 71–85 ^{OT} | 4–7 | 29 – Bevis | 6 – Terrell | 4 – 2 tied | Qubein Center (755); High Point, NC |
| December 21, 2023*; 7:00 p.m., ESPN+ | | Campbell | W 48–47 | 5–7 | 12 – Collins | 6 – Bevis | 3 – 2 tied | Qubein Center (1,128); High Point, NC |
| December 30, 2023*; 4:00 p.m., ESPN+ | | Elon | L 66–74 | 5–8 | 17 – Collins | 7 – Baskerville | 4 – Collins | Qubein Center (1,488); High Point, NC |
Big South regular season
| January 3, 2024; 7:00 p.m., ESPN+ | | Radford | L 61–65 | 5–9 (0–1) | 15 – Bevis | 8 – Terrell | 4 – Terrell | Qubein Center (978); High Point, NC |
| January 6, 2024; 1:00 p.m., ESPN+ | | at Gardner–Webb | W 74–64 | 6–9 (1–1) | 32 – Bevis | 6 – Terrell | 7 – Terrell | Paul Porter Arena (215); Boiling Springs, NC |
| January 10, 2024; 6:30 p.m., ESPN+ | | at UNC Asheville | W 64–50 | 7–9 (2–1) | 17 – Bevis | 6 – 2 tied | 3 – 2 tied | Kimmel Arena (316); Asheville, NC |
| January 17, 2024; 7:00 p.m., ESPN+ | | Presbyterian | W 76–55 | 8–9 (3–1) | 21 – Price | 5 – Zavala | 4 – Terrell | Qubein Center (1,038); High Point, NC |
| January 20, 2024; 2:00 p.m., ESPN+ | | at Charleston Southern | W 74–57 | 9–9 (4–1) | 16 – Bevis | 8 – Baskerville | 5 – McNear | Buccaneer Field House (297); North Charleston, SC |
| January 24, 2024; 7:00 p.m., ESPN+ | | USC Upstate | L 49–59 | 9–10 (4–2) | 17 – Bevis | 7 – Bevis | 2 – 3 tied | Qubein Center (862); High Point, NC |
| January 27, 2024; 7:00 p.m., ESPN+ | | Winthrop | W 75–68 | 10–10 (5–2) | 22 – Bevis | 5 – Bevis | 4 – Häger | Qubein Center (1,505); High Point, NC |
| January 31, 2024; 7:00 p.m., ESPN+ | | at Longwood | W 64–53 | 11–10 (6–2) | 22 – Bevis | 7 – Terrell | 3 – Häger | Joan Perry Brock Center (1,113); Farmville, VA |
| February 3, 2024; 2:00 p.m., ESPN+ | | at Presbyterian | W 64–59 | 12–10 (7–2) | 14 – Terrell | 5 – Bevis | 3 – Häger | Templeton Physical Education Center (352); Clinton, SC |
| February 7, 2024; 7:00 p.m., ESPN+ | | UNC Asheville | W 62–54 | 13–10 (8–2) | 16 – Bevis | 10 – Zavala | 6 – Terrell | Qubein Center (931); High Point, NC |
| February 10, 2024; 7:00 p.m., ESPN+ | | Gardner–Webb | W 75–72 | 14–10 (9–2) | 18 – Terrell | 8 – Zavala | 4 – Terrell | Qubein Center (1,004); High Point, NC |
| February 14, 2024; 7:00 p.m., ESPN+ | | at USC Upstate | W 53–50 | 15–10 (10–2) | 11 – Bevis | 7 – McNear | 6 – Terrell | G. B. Hodge Center (293); Spartanburg, SC |
| February 17, 2024; 2:00 p.m., ESPN+ | | at Radford | W 67–50 | 16–10 (11–2) | 18 – Bevis | 7 – Zavala | 6 – Terrell | Dedmon Center (769); Radford, VA |
| February 24, 2024; 2:00 p.m., ESPN+ | | Charleston Southern | W 63–46 | 17–10 (12–2) | 13 – Price | 6 – Baskerville | 5 – Scheier | Qubein Center (1,384); High Point, NC |
| February 28, 2024; 6:00 p.m., ESPN+ | | at Winthrop | W 65–64 | 18–10 (13–2) | 23 – Bevis | 6 – Johnson | 2 – 2 tied | Winthrop Coliseum (284); Rock Hill, SC |
| March 2, 2024; 7:00 p.m., ESPN+ | | Longwood | W 61–58 | 19–10 (14–2) | 28 – Bevis | 7 – Akinsola | 5 – Terrell | Qubein Center (1,379); High Point, NC |
Big South tournament
| March 7, 2024; 11:30 a.m., ESPN+ | (1) | (9) UNC Asheville; Quarterfinals | W 70–57 | 20–10 | 19 – Bevis | 7 – 2 tied | 7 – Terrell | Qubein Center; High Point, NC |
| March 9, 2024; 6:30 p.m., ESPN+ | (1) | (5) Presbyterian; Semifinals | L 50–59 | 20–11 | 14 – Price | 6 – Terrell | 5 – Terrell | Qubein Center; High Point, NC |
WBIT
| March 21, 2024*; 7:00 p.m., ESPN+ | | at (4) Virginia; First round | L 59–81 | 20–12 | 21 – Akinsola | 7 – Baskerville | 5 – Akinsola | John Paul Jones Arena (1,883); Charlottesville, VA |
*Non-conference game. ^{#}Rankings from AP poll. (#) Tournament seedings in parentheses. All times are in Eastern.
