= 2023–24 UNC Asheville Bulldogs women's basketball team =

American college basketball season

2023–24 UNC Asheville Bulldogs women's basketball
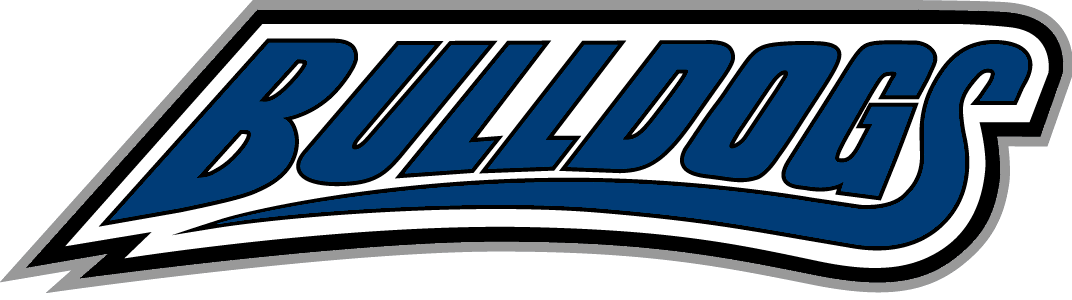
- Conference: Big South Conference
- Record: 11–19 (4–12 Big South)
- Head coach: Honey Brown (4th season)
- Assistant coaches: Dyandria Anderson; Ivey Slaughter; Brittany Bigott
- Home arena: Kimmel Arena

2023–24 Big South women's basketball standings
	Conf.				Overall
Team	W		L	PCT	W		L	PCT
High Point	14	–	2	.875	20	–	12	.625
USC Upstate	10	–	6	.625	16	–	16	.500
Radford	9	–	7	.563	15	–	18	.455
Charleston Southern	8	–	8	.500	11	–	19	.367
Presbyterian †	8	–	8	.500	21	–	15	.583
Winthrop	8	–	8	.500	14	–	16	.467
Longwood	6	–	10	.375	9	–	21	.300
Gardner–Webb	5	–	11	.313	6	–	24	.200
UNC Asheville	4	–	12	.250	11	–	20	.355
† 2024 Big South tournament winner

The 2023–24 UNC Asheville Bulldogs women's basketball team represented the University of North Carolina at Asheville during the 2023–24 NCAA Division I women's basketball season. The Bulldogs, led by fourth-year head coach Honey Brown, played their home games at Kimmel Arena in Asheville, North Carolina, as members of the Big South Conference.

== Previous season ==
The Bulldogs finished the 2022–23 season 12–19, 7–11 in Big South play, to finish in a tie for seventh place. As the #8 seed in the Big South tournament, they defeated #9 seed Winthrop in the first round, before falling to top-seeded and eventual tournament champions Gardner–Webb in the quarterfinals.

== Roster ==
2023–24 UNC Asheville Bulldogs women's basketball team
Players
Coaches

Pos.	#	Name	Height	Year	Previous school	Hometown
G	0	LaImani Simmons	5 ft 9 in (1.75 m)	Jr	High Point	Greenville, SC
G	1	Jaila Lee	5 ft 10 in (1.78 m)	So	St. Francis Brooklyn	Brentwood, TN
G	2	Faith Adams	5 ft 6 in (1.68 m)	Sr	Oakland High School	Murfreesboro, TN
G	3	Trinity Fields	5 ft 4 in (1.63 m)	Fr	Brentwood Academy	Old Hickory, TN
G	4	Taylor Wilkins	5 ft 10 in (1.78 m)	Jr	McNeese	New Orleans, LA
F	5	Nycerra Minnis	6 ft 3 in (1.91 m)	RS Sr	Virginia	Riverdale, MD
G/F	10	Jamaya Blanks	5 ft 10 in (1.78 m)	Sr	Maryland Eastern Shore	Greensboro, NC
G	11	Millie Brown	5 ft 6 in (1.68 m)	So	Brentwood Academy	Nashville, TN
G	13	McKinley Brooks-Sumpter	5 ft 7 in (1.7 m)	RS Sr	USC Upstate	Columbia, SC
F	15	Briauna Thompson	6 ft 3 in (1.91 m)	Sr	South Carolina State	Montgomery, AL
G	20	Dakota McCaughan	5 ft 5 in (1.65 m)	Sr	USC Upstate	Secane, PA
G	23	Mallory Bruce	5 ft 11 in (1.8 m)	Jr	Travelers Rest High School	Greenville, SC
G	24	Jada Brigman	5 ft 9 in (1.75 m)	So	Olympic High School	Charlotte, NC
F	45	Abigail Wilson	5 ft 11 in (1.8 m)	Sr	West Rowan High School	China Grove, NC

Head coach

- Honey Brown (Maryville (TN))

Assistant coach(es)

- Dyandria Anderson (Florida)
- Ivey Slaughter (Florida State)
- Brittany Bigott (St. Thomas (TX))

Legend

- (C) Team captain
- (S) Suspended
- (I) Ineligible
- (W) Walk-on
- Injured
- Current redshirt

Roster
Last update: January 12, 2024

== Schedule and results ==
Date time, TV	Rank^{#}	Opponent^{#}	Result	Record	High points	High rebounds	High assists	Site (attendance) city, state
Non-conference regular season
November 7, 2023*; 7:00 p.m., ESPN+		at Furman	L 61–71	0–1	14 – Simmons	6 – 3 tied	2 – Lee	Timmons Arena (577); Greenville, SC
November 12, 2023*; 2:00 p.m., ESPN+		Tennessee State	W 53–38	1–1	14 – Simmons	9 – Lee	4 – Brown	Kimmel Arena (341); Asheville, NC
November 14, 2023*; 6:30 p.m., ESPN+		at Charlotte	L 51–67	1–2	10 – Blanks	7 – Wilson	3 – 2 tied	Dale F. Halton Arena (722); Charlotte, NC
November 21, 2023*; 2:00 p.m., ESPN+		Queens	W 67–53	2–2	20 – Brooks-Sumpter	11 – Brooks-Sumpter	3 – McCaughan	Kimmel Arena (267); Asheville, NC
November 24, 2023*; 4:00 p.m.		vs. Morgan State; Puerto Rico Thanksgiving Clasico	L 51–53	2–3	14 – Simmons	8 – Brooks-Sumpter	3 – Adams	Coliseo Rubén Rodríguez (100); Bayamón, Puerto Rico
November 25, 2023*; 4:00 p.m.		vs. Western Michigan; Puerto Rico Thanksgiving Clasico	L 54–58	2–4	17 – Brooks-Sumpter	9 – Blanks	3 – Adams	Coliseo Rubén Rodríguez (100); Bayamón, Puerto Rico
November 29, 2023*; 7:00 p.m., ESPN+		at Wofford	L 54–63	2–5	18 – Brooks-Sumpter	9 – Brooks-Sumpter	3 – Adams	Jerry Richardson Indoor Stadium (340); Spartanburg, SC
December 6, 2023*; 11:30 a.m., ESPN+		Warren Wilson	W 88–33	3–5	16 – Brooks-Sumpter	7 – 3 tied	5 – McCaughan	Kimmel Arena (1,561); Asheville, NC
December 9, 2023*; 7:00 p.m., ESPN+		at Western Carolina	W 59–48	4–5	20 – Simmons	6 – 3 tied	4 – Brooks-Sumpter	Ramsey Center (581); Cullowhee, NC
December 14, 2023*; 7:00 p.m., ESPN+		at East Tennessee State	L 51–60	4–6	15 – Simmons	7 – Brooks-Sumpter	2 – 2 tied	Brooks Gymnasium (412); Johnson City, TN
December 18, 2023*; 2:00 p.m., ESPN+		North Carolina Central	L 63–65	4–7	17 – Simmons	10 – Blanks	4 – Brooks-Sumpter	Kimmel Arena (263); Asheville, NC
December 21, 2023*; 2:00 p.m., ESPN+/CW62		UNC Greensboro	W 72–71	5–7	15 – Simmons	8 – Brooks-Sumpter	4 – Blanks	Kimmel Arena (217); Asheville, NC
December 29, 2023*; 5:00 p.m., ESPN+		Brevard	W 72–34	6–7	17 – Lee	12 – Brooks-Sumpter	4 – Wilkins	Kimmel Arena (334); Asheville, NC
Big South regular season
January 3, 2024; 7:00 p.m., ESPN+		at USC Upstate; Ingles I-26 Rivalry	L 44–71	6–8 (0–1)	10 – McCaughan	9 – Bruce	2 – Bruce	G. B. Hodge Center (212); Spartanburg, SC
January 6, 2024; 2:00 p.m., ESPN+		Presbyterian	L 46–55	6–9 (0–2)	14 – Brooks-Sumpter	8 – Wilson	3 – Brooks-Sumpter	Kimmel Arena (235); Asheville, NC
January 10, 2024; 6:30 p.m., ESPN+		High Point	L 50–64	6–10 (0–3)	21 – Simmons	10 – Blanks	2 – Brooks-Sumpter	Kimmel Arena (316); Asheville, NC
January 13, 2024; 2:00 p.m., ESPN+		at Longwood	W 69–61	7–10 (1–3)	21 – Brooks-Sumpter	14 – Brooks-Sumpter	5 – Brooks-Sumpter	Joan Perry Brock Center (879); Farmville, VA
January 17, 2024; 6:30 p.m., ESPN+		Winthrop	L 64–70 ^{OT}	7–11 (1–4)	21 – Brooks-Sumpter	6 – 2 tied	6 – Brooks-Sumpter	Kimmel Arena (500); Asheville, NC
January 24, 2024; 7:00 p.m., ESPN+		at Radford	L 46–59	7–12 (1–5)	16 – Bruce	7 – Brooks-Sumpter	2 – 2 tied	Dedmon Center (833); Radford, VA
January 27, 2024; 2:00 p.m., ESPN+		at Charleston Southern	W 62–59	8–12 (2–5)	25 – Brooks-Sumpter	11 – Brooks-Sumpter	6 – Adams	Buccaneer Field House; North Charleston, SC
January 31, 2024; 6:30 p.m., ESPN+		Gardner–Webb	W 72–58	9–12 (3–5)	28 – Bruce	8 – Bruce	5 – Brooks-Sumpter	Kimmel Arena (341); Asheville, NC
February 3, 2024; 2:00 p.m., ESPN+		at Winthrop	L 56–65	9–13 (3–6)	12 – Blanks	6 – Blanks	3 – Brooks-Sumpter	Winthrop Coliseum (391); Rock Hill, SC
February 7, 2024; 7:00 p.m., ESPN+		at High Point	L 54–62	9–14 (3–7)	20 – Brooks-Sumpter	10 – Lee	3 – 2 tied	Qubein Center (931); High Point, NC
February 10, 2024; 1:00 p.m., ESPN+/CW62		USC Upstate; Ingles I-26 Rivalry	L 65–71	9–15 (3–8)	21 – Bruce	6 – 3 tied	3 – 3 tied	Kimmel Arena (276); Asheville, NC
February 14, 2024; 6:30 p.m., ESPN+		at Presbyterian	L 42–59	9–16 (3–9)	25 – Bruce	9 – Blanks	2 – Adams	Templeton Physical Education Center (434); Clinton, SC
February 17, 2024; 2:00 p.m., ESPN+		Charleston Southern	W 68–63 ^{OT}	10–16 (4–9)	20 – Brooks-Sumpter	8 – Bruce	3 – 2 tied	Kimmel Arena (583); Asheville, NC
February 21, 2024; 6:30 p.m., ESPN+		Longwood	L 60–66	10–17 (4–10)	19 – Bruce	9 – Adams	5 – Brooks-Sumpter	Kimmel Arena (238); Asheville, NC
February 24, 2024; 1:00 p.m., ESPN+		at Gardner–Webb	L 65–80	10–18 (4–11)	21 – 2 tied	8 – Bruce	2 – Adams	Paul Porter Arena (255); Boiling Springs, NC
March 2, 2024; 2:00 p.m., ESPN+		Radford	L 54–55	10–19 (4–12)	15 – Brooks-Sumpter	8 – Brooks-Sumpter	4 – Brooks-Sumpter	Kimmel Arena (592); Asheville, NC
Big South tournament
March 6, 2024; 6:00 p.m., ESPN+	(9)	vs. (8) Gardner–Webb; Opening round	W 75–74	11–19	23 – Brooks-Sumpter	10 – Wilson	6 – Brooks-Sumpter	Qubein Center; High Point, NC
March 7, 2024; 11:30 a.m., ESPN+	(9)	vs. (1) High Point; Quarterfinals	L 57-70 ^{OT}	11-20	18 – Brooks-Sumpter	10 – Bruce	4 – Adams	Qubein Center; High Point, NC
*Non-conference game. ^{#}Rankings from AP poll. (#) Tournament seedings in parentheses. All times are in Eastern.
