= 2023–24 Presbyterian Blue Hose women's basketball team =

American college basketball season

2023–24 Presbyterian Blue Hose women's basketball
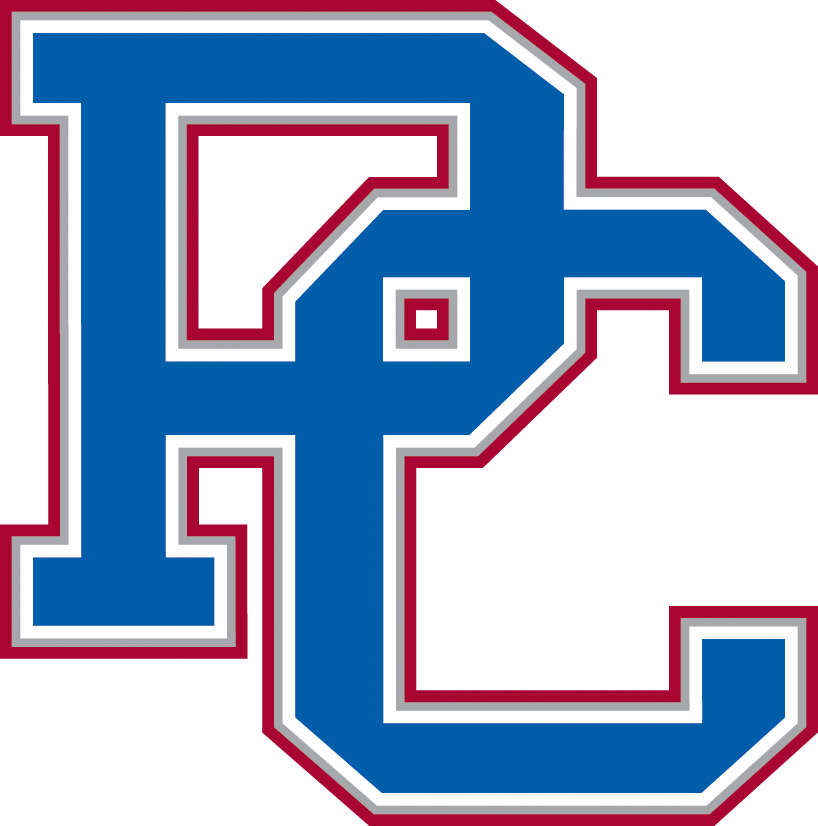

Big South tournament champions

NCAA tournament, first round
- Conference: Big South Conference
- Record: 21–15 (8–8 Big South)
- Head coach: Alaura Sharp (6th season)
- Assistant coaches: Bubby Johnson; Brooklyn Taylor; Caleb Thomas; LaRomeo McKee
- Home arena: Templeton Physical Education Center

2023–24 Big South women's basketball standings
	Conf.				Overall
Team	W		L	PCT	W		L	PCT
High Point	14	–	2	.875	20	–	12	.625
USC Upstate	10	–	6	.625	16	–	16	.500
Radford	9	–	7	.563	15	–	18	.455
Charleston Southern	8	–	8	.500	11	–	19	.367
Presbyterian †	8	–	8	.500	21	–	15	.583
Winthrop	8	–	8	.500	14	–	16	.467
Longwood	6	–	10	.375	9	–	21	.300
Gardner–Webb	5	–	11	.313	6	–	24	.200
UNC Asheville	4	–	12	.250	11	–	20	.355
† 2024 Big South tournament winner

The 2023–24 Presbyterian Blue Hose women's basketball team represented Presbyterian College during the 2023–24 NCAA Division I women's basketball season. The Blue Hose, led by sixth-year head coach Alaura Sharp, played their home games at the Templeton Physical Education Center in Clinton, South Carolina as members of the Big South Conference.

The Blue Hose finished the season 21–15, 8–8 in Big South play, to finish in a three-way tie for fourth place. They defeated Charleston Southern, top-seeded High Point and Radford to win their first-ever Big South tournament championship, and, in turn, their first-ever NCAA tournament appearance. They received the #16 seed in the Albany Regional 1, where they defeated Sacred Heart in the First Four before falling to eventual undefeated national champions South Carolina in the first round.

== Previous season ==
The Blue Hose finished the 2022–23 season 13–17, 9–9 in Big South play, to finish in a tie for fourth place. As the #5 seed in the Big South tournament, they were defeated by #4 seed Radford in the quarterfinals.

== Roster ==
2023–24 Presbyterian Blue Hose women's basketball team
Players
Coaches

Pos.	#	Name	Height	Year	Previous school	Hometown
F	00	Dennaye Hinds	6 ft 1 in (1.85 m)	So	St. Joseph High School	Bridgeport, CT
G	1	Natalie Herrin	5 ft 8 in (1.73 m)	So	Pierce County High School	Patterson, GA
G	2	Laila Grant	5 ft 7 in (1.7 m)	Sr	Vincennes	Derwood, MD
G	3	Ashley Carrillo	5 ft 7 in (1.7 m)	So	Liberal High School	Liberal, KS
G	4	Tilda Sjökvist	5 ft 7 in (1.7 m)	So	Sanda Gymnasiet	Huskvarna, Sweden
G	5	Christina Kline	5 ft 10 in (1.78 m)	Sr	La Salle	Winter Garden, FL
G	10	Mara Neira	5 ft 7 in (1.7 m)	Jr	Eastern Wyoming College	Galicia, Spain
G	11	Sonia Sato	6 ft 0 in (1.83 m)	Sr	McCook Community College	El Paso, TX
G	15	Paige Kindseth	5 ft 9 in (1.75 m)	Jr	Farmington High School	Farmington, MN
F	20	Dagne Apsite	6 ft 2 in (1.88 m)	Sr	UTEP	Saldus, Latvia
F	22	Núria Cunill	6 ft 1 in (1.85 m)	Sr	Eastern Washington	Berga, Spain
G	23	Laney Scoggins	5 ft 11 in (1.8 m)	Fr	Hoggard High School	Leland, NC
C	34	Bryanna Brady	6 ft 3 in (1.91 m)	Sr	UC Riverside	Goodyear, AZ
G	35	Aubrie Kierscht	5 ft 6 in (1.68 m)	So	Salina High School Central	Salina, KS

Head coach

- Alaura Sharp (Southwest Minnesota State)

Assistant coach(es)

- Bubby Johnson (Florida Southern)
- Brooklyn Taylor (Saint Francis (PA))
- Caleb Thomas (Carroll)
- LaRomeo McKee (Southern Miss)

Legend

- (C) Team captain
- (S) Suspended
- (I) Ineligible
- (W) Walk-on
- Injured
- Current redshirt

Roster
Last update: January 9, 2024

== Schedule and results ==
Date time, TV	Rank^{#}	Opponent^{#}	Result	Record	High points	High rebounds	High assists	Site (attendance) city, state
Non-conference regular season
November 6, 2023*; 7:30 p.m., ESPN+		at Kansas State	L 35–69	0–1	10 – Kierscht	7 – Kline	4 – 2 tied	Bramlage Coliseum (2,868); Manhattan, KS
November 8, 2023*; 12:00 p.m., ESPN+		at Wichita State	L 41–60	0–2	11 – Kline	8 – Scoggins	5 – Carrillo	Charles Koch Arena (2,835); Wichita, KS
November 11, 2023*; 2:00 p.m., ESPN+		Johnson C. Smith	W 76–40	1–2	17 – Brady	6 – 3 tied	5 – Kline	Templeton Physical Education Center (300); Clinton, SC
November 15, 2023*; 6:30 p.m., ESPN+		Columbia International	W 95–43	2–2	18 – Brady	8 – Cunill	7 – Carrillo	Templeton Physical Education Center (237); Clinton, SC
November 19, 2023*; 3:00 p.m., ESPN+		East Tennessee State	L 56–72	2–3	22 – Brady	9 – 2 tied	4 – Neira	Templeton Physical Education Center (316); Clinton, SC
November 22, 2023*; 2:00 p.m., FloHoops		at UNC Wilmington	W 64–51	3–3	20 – Brady	6 – Kindseth	4 – 2 tied	Trask Coliseum (558); Wilmington, NC
November 25, 2023*; 2:00 p.m., ESPN+		Morehead State	W 65–59	4–3	26 – Sjökvist	6 – Kline	3 – Sjökvist	Templeton Physical Education Center (237); Clinton, SC
November 29, 2023*; 11:00 a.m., ESPN+		North Carolina Central	W 76–58	5–3	21 – Sjökvist	7 – Brady	6 – Sjökvist	Templeton Physical Education Center (507); Clinton, SC
December 2, 2023*; 4:00 p.m., ESPN+		at Western Carolina	W 60–41	6–3	19 – Neira	7 – Kindseth	3 – Sjökvist	Ramsey Center (436); Cullowhee, NC
December 6, 2023*; 7:00 p.m., ESPN+		at Queens	W 68–60	7–3	24 – Neira	6 – 3 tied	3 – 2 tied	Curry Arena (104); Charlotte, NC
December 15, 2023*; 6:30 p.m., ESPN+		South Carolina State	W 63–52	8–3	18 – Sjökvist	8 – Brady	5 – Carrillo	Templeton Physical Education Center (90); Clinton, SC
December 16, 2023*; 1:00 p.m., ESPN+		at No. 1 South Carolina	L 29–99	8–4	15 – Sjökvist	6 – Cunill	2 – Brady	Colonial Life Arena (15,176); Columbia, SC
December 21, 2023*; 3:00 p.m., FloHoops		vs. Eastern Washington; Vegas Holiday Hoops	L 51–92	8–5	10 – Brady	5 – Kindseth	5 – Sjökvist	South Point Arena; Enterprise, NV
December 22, 2023*; 5:30 p.m., FloHoops		vs. Wright State; Vegas Holiday Hoops	L 61–66	8–6	25 – Neira	5 – Scoggins	6 – Sjökvist	South Point Arena; Enterprise, NV
December 31, 2023*; 2:00 p.m., ESPN+		Columbia College (SC)	W 63–52	9–6	27 – Brady	17 – Cunill	5 – Sjökvist	Templeton Physical Education Center (245); Clinton, SC
Big South regular season
January 3, 2024; 6:30 p.m., ESPN+		Charleston Southern	L 57–61	9–7 (0–1)	26 – Sjökvist	8 – 2 tied	2 – 2 tied	Templeton Physical Education Center (194); Clinton, SC
January 6, 2024; 2:00 p.m., ESPN+		at UNC Asheville	W 55–46	10–7 (1–1)	20 – Neira	8 – Kindseth	4 – 2 tied	Kimmel Arena (235); Asheville, NC
January 10, 2024; 6:00 p.m., ESPN+		at Winthrop	W 59–43	11–7 (2–1)	21 – Neira	6 – 3 tied	8 – Sjökvist	Winthrop Coliseum (285); Rock Hill, SC
January 13, 2024; 2:00 p.m., ESPN+		Gardner–Webb	L 58–72	11–8 (2–2)	19 – Brady	7 – Hinds	3 – Neira	Templeton Physical Education Center (303); Clinton, SC
January 17, 2024; 7:00 p.m., ESPN+		at High Point	L 55–76	11–9 (2–3)	12 – 2 tied	10 – Neira	4 – 2 tied	Qubein Center (1,038); High Point, NC
January 20, 2024; 2:00 p.m., ESPN+		Longwood	W 69–66	12–9 (3–3)	20 – Sjökvist	6 – 2 tied	5 – Brady	Templeton Physical Education Center (289); Clinton, SC
January 27, 2024; 2:00 p.m., ESPN+		at Radford	L 40–65	12–10 (3–4)	12 – Brady	8 – Neira	4 – Sjökvist	Dedmon Center; Radford, VA
January 31, 2024; 7:00 p.m., ESPN+		at USC Upstate	L 58–62	12–11 (3–5)	17 – Kline	8 – Scoggins	3 – Neira	G. B. Hodge Center (215); Spartanburg, SC
February 3, 2024; 2:00 p.m., ESPN+		High Point	L 59–64	12–12 (3–6)	16 – Neira	7 – Sjökvist	4 – Sjökvist	Templeton Physical Education Center (352); Clinton, SC
February 7, 2024; 7:00 p.m., ESPN+		at Gardner–Webb	L 57–86	12–13 (3–7)	11 – 2 tied	4 – 3 tied	5 – Sjökvist	Paul Porter Arena (157); Boiling Springs, NC
February 10, 2024; 2:00 p.m., ESPN+		Radford	W 57–50	13–13 (4–7)	18 – Neira	10 – Neira	3 – 2 tied	Templeton Physical Education Center (375); Clinton, SC
February 14, 2024; 6:30 p.m., ESPN+		UNC Asheville	W 59–42	14–13 (5–7)	13 – Brady	7 – Sjökvist	4 – Kline	Templeton Physical Education Center (434); Clinton, SC
February 17, 2024; 2:00 p.m., ESPN+		at Longwood	W 67–52	15–13 (6–7)	20 – Sjökvist	8 – Brady	5 – Sjökvist	Joan Perry Brock Center (1,015); Farmville, VA
February 21, 2024; 6:30 p.m., ESPN+		Winthrop	W 62–40	16–13 (7–7)	23 – Brady	7 – Kindseth	4 – Neira	Templeton Physical Education Center (273); Clinton, SC
February 28, 2024; 6:30 p.m., ESPN+		USC Upstate	W 47–43	17–13 (8–7)	14 – Sjökvist	6 – Sato	3 – Sjökvist	Templeton Physical Education Center (406); Clinton, SC
March 2, 2024; 2:00 p.m., ESPN+		at Charleston Southern	L 49–68	17–14 (8–8)	12 – Neira	6 – Brady	7 – Sjökvist	Buccaneer Field House (207); North Charleston, SC
Big South tournament
March 7, 2024; 2:00 p.m., ESPN+	(5)	vs. (4) Charleston Southern; Quarterfinals	W 54–51	18–14	18 – Sjökvist	8 – Kindseth	3 – Sjökvist	Qubein Center; High Point, NC
March 9, 2024; 2:00 p.m., ESPN+	(5)	vs. (1) High Point; Semifinals	W 59–50	19–14	19 – Sjökvist	10 – Cunill	4 – Kindseth	Qubein Center; High Point, NC
March 10, 2024; 2:00 p.m., ESPN2	(5)	vs. (3) Radford; Finals	W 60–37	20–14	21 – Brady	9 – Scoggins	6 – Sjökvist	Qubein Center; High Point, NC
NCAA tournament
March 20, 2024*; 7:00 p.m., ESPNU	(16 A1)	vs. (16 A1) Sacred Heart; First Four	W 49–42	21–14	14 – Neira	6 – Neira	6 – Sjökvist	Colonial Life Arena (1,196); Columbia, SC
March 22, 2024*; 2:00 p.m., ESPN	(16 A1)	at (1 A1) No. 1 South Carolina; First round	L 39–91	21–15	9 – 2 tied	6 – Cunill	4 – Kline	Colonial Life Arena (11,536); Columbia, SC
*Non-conference game. ^{#}Rankings from AP poll. (#) Tournament seedings in parentheses. All times are in Eastern.
