= Appalachian State Mountaineers basketball =

Appalachian State Mountaineers basketball may refer to either of the basketball teams that represent Appalachian State University:

- Appalachian State Mountaineers men's basketball
- Appalachian State Mountaineers women's basketball
