= 2023–24 Gardner–Webb Runnin' Bulldogs women's basketball team =

American college basketball season

2023–24 Gardner–Webb Runnin' Bulldogs women's basketball
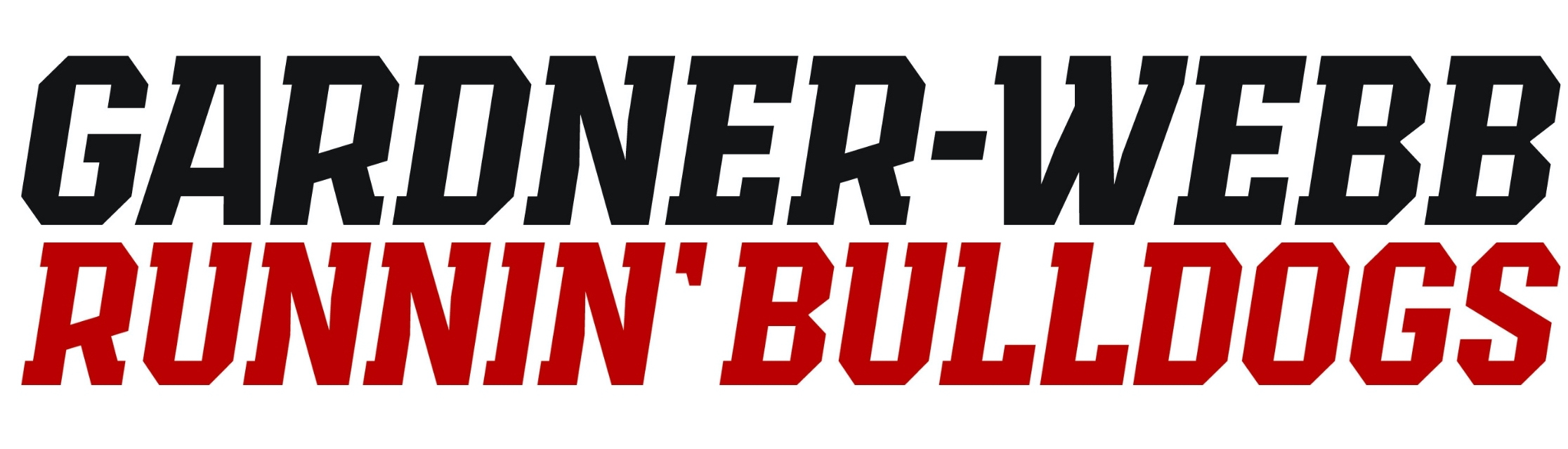
- Conference: Big South Conference
- Record: 6–24 (5–11 Big South)
- Head coach: Scott Merritt (1st season)
- Assistant coaches: Katie Nelson; Lauren Holden; Jonath Nicholas
- Home arena: Paul Porter Arena

2023–24 Big South women's basketball standings
	Conf.				Overall
Team	W		L	PCT	W		L	PCT
High Point	14	–	2	.875	20	–	12	.625
USC Upstate	10	–	6	.625	16	–	16	.500
Radford	9	–	7	.563	15	–	18	.455
Charleston Southern	8	–	8	.500	11	–	19	.367
Presbyterian †	8	–	8	.500	21	–	15	.583
Winthrop	8	–	8	.500	14	–	16	.467
Longwood	6	–	10	.375	9	–	21	.300
Gardner–Webb	5	–	11	.313	6	–	24	.200
UNC Asheville	4	–	12	.250	11	–	20	.355
† 2024 Big South tournament winner

The 2023–24 Gardner–Webb Runnin' Bulldogs women's basketball team represented Gardner–Webb University during the 2023–24 NCAA Division I women's basketball season. The Runnin' Bulldogs, were led by first-year head coach Scott Merritt, played their home games at Paul Porter Arena in Boiling Springs, North Carolina as members of the Big South Conference.

== Previous season ==
The Runnin' Bulldogs finished the 2022–23 season 29–5, 18–0 in Big South play, to finish as Big South regular season champions. In the Big South tournament, they defeated UNC Asheville, Radford, and High Point to win the Big South tournament championship and earning the conference's automatic bid into the NCAA tournament. They received the #15 seed in the Greenville Regional 2. They would end up losing to #2 region seed Utah in the first round.

On April 6, head coach Alex Simmons announced that she would be stepping down, after 5 seasons at the helm, in order to take the head coaching position at Memphis. On April 22, the school named Wisconsin associate head coach Scott Merritt the team's next head coach.

== Roster ==
2023–24 Gardner–Webb Runnin' Bulldogs women's basketball team
Players
Coaches

Pos.	#	Name	Height	Year	Previous school	Hometown
G	0	Micahla Funderburk	5 ft 11 in (1.8 m)	Sr	Butler High School	Charlotte, NC
G	1	Kayla Martin	5 ft 8 in (1.73 m)	Fr	St. Francis Prep	Cambria Heights, NY
G	2	Amina Gray	5 ft 6 in (1.68 m)	Fr	Example Academy	DeKalb, IL
G	3	Lauren Bailey	5 ft 8 in (1.73 m)	Fr	Greeneville High School	Greeneville, TN
G	5	Anaya Harris	5 ft 9 in (1.75 m)	Fr	North Raleigh Christian Academy	Raleigh, NC
G	10	Nyla Walker	5 ft 4 in (1.63 m)	So	USC Upstate	Frankfort, IL
F	13	Andrea Martinez	6 ft 1 in (1.85 m)	Fr	Boet Mataró	Barcelona, Spain
G	23	Ashley Hawkins	5 ft 6 in (1.68 m)	Jr	Cypress College	Long Beach, CA
F	30	Ramatoulaye Keita	5 ft 11 in (1.8 m)	GS	Buffalo	Bamako, Mali
C	33	Grace Pack	6 ft 2 in (1.88 m)	So	TPLS Christian Academy	Midlothian, VA
F	44	Trinity Moreland	6 ft 2 in (1.88 m)	So	Kansas City	Charlotte, NC

Head coach

- Scott Merritt (Marquette)

Assistant coach(es)

- Katie Nelson (Boston University)
- Lauren Holden (Fordham)
- Jonath Nicholas (UAB)

Legend

- (C) Team captain
- (S) Suspended
- (I) Ineligible
- (W) Walk-on
- Injured
- Current redshirt

Roster
Last update: January 12, 2024

== Schedule and results ==
Date time, TV	Rank^{#}	Opponent^{#}	Result	Record	High points	High rebounds	High assists	Site (attendance) city, state
Non-conference regular season
November 8, 2023*; 7:00 pm, ACCNX		at No. 16 North Carolina	L 49–102	0–1	16 – Funderburk	5 – 2 Tied	2 – 2 Tied	Carmichael Arena (2,212); Chapel Hill, NC
November 11, 2023*; 1:00 pm, ESPN+		Elon	L 69–90	0–2	16 – 2 Tied	6 – Funderburk	5 – Hawkins	Paul Porter Arena (245); Boiling Springs, NC
November 15, 2023*; 11:00 am, ESPN+		Richmond	L 53–80	0–3	12 – Hawkins	11 – Keita	4 – Hawkins	Paul Porter Arena (2,167); Boiling Springs, NC
November 17, 2023*; 6:30 pm, ESPN+		at Charlotte	L 43–93	0–4	11 – Pack	5 – 3 Tied	4 – Hawkins	Dale F. Halton Arena (635); Charlotte, NC
November 20, 2023*; 7:00 pm, FloHoops		at Charleston	L 78–90	0–5	18 – Walker	7 – Bailey	11 – Hawkins	TD Arena (285); Charleston, SC
November 26, 2023*; 2:00 pm, ESPN+		at UNC Greensboro	L 47–64	0–6	10 – Funderburk	9 – Keita	2 – 2 Tied	Fleming Gymnasium (186); Greensboro, NC
November 29, 2023*; 7:00 pm, ESPN+		Furman	L 66–73	0–7	23 – Hawkins	13 – Keita	5 – Hawkins	Paul Porter Arena (150); Boiling Springs, NC
December 7, 2023*; 7:00 pm, ESPN+		at Florida Gulf Coast	L 53–102	0–8	20 – Hawkins	8 – Keita	3 – Hawkins	Alico Arena (1,251); Fort Myers, FL
December 10, 2023*; 1:00 pm, ESPN+		at South Florida	L 75–105	0–9	18 – Bailey	6 – Keita	8 – Hawkins	Yuengling Center (2,346); Tampa, FL
December 15, 2023*; 8:00 pm, ESPN+		Appalachian State	W 82–78	1–9	28 – Hawkins	11 – Martinez	6 – Hawkins	Paul Porter Arena (117); Boiling Springs, NC
December 17, 2023*; 3:00 pm, ESPN+		Florida	L 37–115	1–10	11 – Funderburk	8 – Pack	3 – Hawkins	Paul Porter Arena (270); Boiling Springs, NC
December 20, 2023*; 5:00 pm, ESPN+		at East Tennessee State	L 48–60	1–11	15 – Hawkins	8 – Keita	3 – Hawkins	Brooks Gymnasium; Johnson City, TN
December 30, 2023*; 2:00 pm, ESPN+		at Queens	L 48–66	1–12	10 – Pack	12 – Keita	7 – Hawkins	Curry Arena; Charlotte, NC
Big South regular season
January 6, 2024; 1:00 pm, ESPN+		High Point	L 64–74	1–13 (0–1)	20 – Hawkins	12 – Keita	7 – Hawkins	Paul Porter Arena (215); Boiling Springs, NC
January 10, 2024; 6:00 pm, ESPN+		at Charleston Southern	L 61–83	1–14 (0–2)	18 – Harris	9 – Keita	4 – Hawkins	Buccaneer Field House (347); North Charleston, SC
January 13, 2024; 2:00 pm, ESPN+		at Presbyterian	W 72–58	2–14 (1–2)	19 – Hawkins	7 – Keita	8 – Hawkins	Templeton Physical Education Center (303); Clinton, SC
January 17, 2024; 7:00 pm, ESPN+		Radford	L 71–80	2–15 (1–3)	20 – Hawkins	17 – Martinez	7 – Hawkins	Paul Porter Arena (115); Boiling Springs, NC
January 20, 2024; 2:00 pm, ESPN+		at Winthrop	L 50–61	2–16 (1–4)	13 – Hawkins	5 – 3 Tied	5 – Hawkins	Winthrop Coliseum (218); Rock Hill, SC
January 24, 2024; 7:00 pm, ESPN+		Longwood	W 74–59	3–16 (2–4)	15 – 2 Tied	13 – Keita	10 – Hawkins	Paul Porter Arena (208); Boiling Springs, NC
January 27, 2024; 1:00 pm, ESPN+		USC Upstate	L 59–78	3–17 (2–5)	14 – Hawkins	16 – Keita	7 – Hawkins	Paul Porter Arena (509); Boiling Springs, NC
January 31, 2024; 6:30 pm, ESPN+		at UNC Asheville	L 58–72	3–18 (2–6)	18 – Pack	7 – 2 Tied	6 – Hawkins	Kimmel Arena (341); Asheville, NC
February 7, 2024; 7:00 pm, ESPN+		Presbyterian	W 86–57	4–18 (3–6)	21 – Funderburk	7 – Harris	9 – Hawkins	Paul Porter Arena (157); Boiling Springs, NC
February 10, 2024; 7:00 pm, ESPN+		at High Point	L 72–75	4–19 (3–7)	22 – Hawkins	7 – 2 Tied	3 – Hawkins	Qubein Center (1,004); High Point, NC
February 14, 2024; 7:00 pm, ESPN+		Charleston Southern	L 69–76	4–20 (3–8)	17 – Pack	11 – Pack	5 – Hawkins	Paul Porter Arena (152); Boiling Springs, NC
February 17, 2024; 2:00 pm, ESPN+		at USC Upstate	L 56–73	4–21 (3–9)	11 – Hawkins	9 – Pack	7 – Hawkins	G. B. Hodge Center; Spartanburg, SC
February 21, 2024; 7:00 pm, ESPN+		at Radford	W 63–58	5–21 (4–9)	23 – Hawkins	12 – Bailey	5 – Hawkins	Dedmon Center (744); Radford, VA
February 24, 2024; 1:00 pm, ESPN+		UNC Asheville	W 80–65	6–21 (5–9)	20 – Harris	6 – Keita	9 – Hawkins	Paul Porter Arena (255); Boiling Springs, NC
February 28, 2024; 7:00 pm, ESPN+		at Longwood	L 57–67	6–22 (5–10)	22 – Hawkins	8 – Hawkins	7 – Hawkins	Joan Perry Brock Center (873); Farmville, VA
March 2, 2024; 1:00 pm, ESPN+		Winthrop	L 54–72	6–23 (5–11)	10 – Harris	5 – 2 Tied	4 – Harris	Paul Porter Arena (369); Boiling Springs, NC
Big South tournament
March 6, 2024; 6:00 p.m., ESPN+	(8)	vs. (9) UNC Asheville; Opening round	L 74–75	6–24	33 – Hawkins	9 – Hawkins	4 – Hawkins	Qubein Center; High Point, NC
*Non-conference game. ^{#}Rankings from AP poll. (#) Tournament seedings in parentheses. All times are in Eastern.
