= Alaura Sharp =

American basketball coach (born October 12, 1977)

Current position
- Title: Head Coach
- Team: Appalachian State
- Conference: Sun Belt
- Record: 27–37 (.422)

Biographical details
- Born: October 12, 1977 (age 49); Fredonia, Kansas, U.S.
- Education: Southwest Minnesota State (BA) ('06)

Coaching career (HC unless noted)
- 2006–2008: Adams State (asst.)
- 2008–2009: Lamar CC
- 2009–2013: Garden City CC
- 2013–2015: Southern Miss. (Assoc. HC)
- 2015–2018: Louisiana Tech (Assoc. HC)
- 2018–2024: Presbyterian
- 2024–present: Appalachian State

Head coaching record
- Overall: 215–188 (.533)
- Tournaments: 1–1 (NCAA)

Accomplishments and honors

Championships
- 2024 Big South Tournament

Alaura Lea Sharp (born October 12, 1977) is an American college basketball coach and is the current head coach of the Appalachian State Mountaineers women's basketball team. She previously served as the head coach of the Presbyterian Blue Hose women's basketball team from 2018 to 2024. At Presbyterian, she led her team to their first ever NCAA Tournament and their first ever NCAA tournament win when they beat the Sacred Heart Pioneers 49–42 in a First Four matchup.

== Coaching career ==
Sharp played basketball for the women's basketball team at Southwest Minnesota State University. After graduation, she landed her first coaching job as an assistant coach at Adams State University. Following a two-year stint at Adams State, Sharp accepted a head coaching position at Lamar Community College in Colorado. At the conclusion of the 2008–2009 season, Sharp became the head coach of the women's basketball team at Garden City Community College and remained in that position for four years. During that time she compiled an 83–45 record, defeated 11 nationally ranked teams, and turned the Broncbusters into a top contender each year in the tough Kansas Jayhawk Community College Conference and Region VI. In 2012–13, Sharp guided Garden City Community College to its best record in school history at 29-4 and a No. 13 ranking in the NJCAA polls.

Following her success at the JuCo level, she was hired as an associate head coach at the University of Southern Mississippi. Following two years and two WNIT appearances with Southern Mississippi University in 2014 and 2015, Sharp took another associate head coach and recruiting coordinator position with the Louisiana Tech Lady Techsters. During her time there, the team reached the 2017 Women's National Invitation Tournament.

In 2018, Sharp accepted her first Division I head coach coaching job at Presbyterian. From 2018 to 2024, Sharp won 76 games. During the 2023-2024 season, Sharp guided her team to a 2024 Big South Tournament championship. This secured the Presbyterian women's basketball team's first-ever trip to the NCAA Tournament. During a First Four matchup with the Sacred Heart Pioneers, Sharp led Presbyterian to their first-ever NCAA tournament victory. Following the play-in game, Presbyterian faced an undefeated South Carolina Gamecocks team led by Dawn Staley. Although Presbyterian lost by 52 points to South Carolina, Sharp praised Staley for making a pregame visit to talk with her team who was making their first NCAA tournament appearance.

On April 5, 2024, Sharp was announced as the new head coach of the Appalachian State Mountaineers women's basketball team.

== Head coaching record ==
=== NCAA DI ===
Record table
| Season | Team | Overall | Conference | Standing | Postseason |
|---|---|---|---|---|---|
Presbyterian Blue Hose (Big South) (2018–2024)
| 2018–19 | Presbyterian | 7–24 | 4–14 | 9th | |
| 2019–20 | Presbyterian | 12–18 | 7–13 | 9th | Postseason Canceled |
| 2020–21 | Presbyterian | 11–10 | 10–8 | 5th | |
| 2021–22 | Presbyterian | 12–18 | 6–12 | 8th | |
| 2022–23 | Presbyterian | 13–17 | 9–9 | 4th | |
| 2023–24 | Presbyterian | 21–15 | 8–8 | 5th | NCAA First Round |
| Presbyterian: | | 76–102 (.427) | 44–64 (.407) | | |
Appalachian State Mountaineers (Sun Belt) (2024–present)
| 2024–25 | Appalachian State | 13–17 | 9–9 | T–5th | |
| 2025–26 | Appalachian State | 11–19 | 4–14 | 13th | |
| 2026-27 | Appalachian State | 3-1 | 0-0 | | |
| Appalachian State: | | 27–37 (.422) | 13–23 (.361) | | |
| Total: | | 103–139 (.426) | | | |
National champion Postseason invitational champion Conference regular season champion Conference regular season and conference tournament champion Division regular season champion Division regular season and conference tournament champion Conference tournament champion
