= 2023–24 Charleston Southern Buccaneers women's basketball team =

American college basketball season

2023–24 Charleston Southern Buccaneers women's basketball
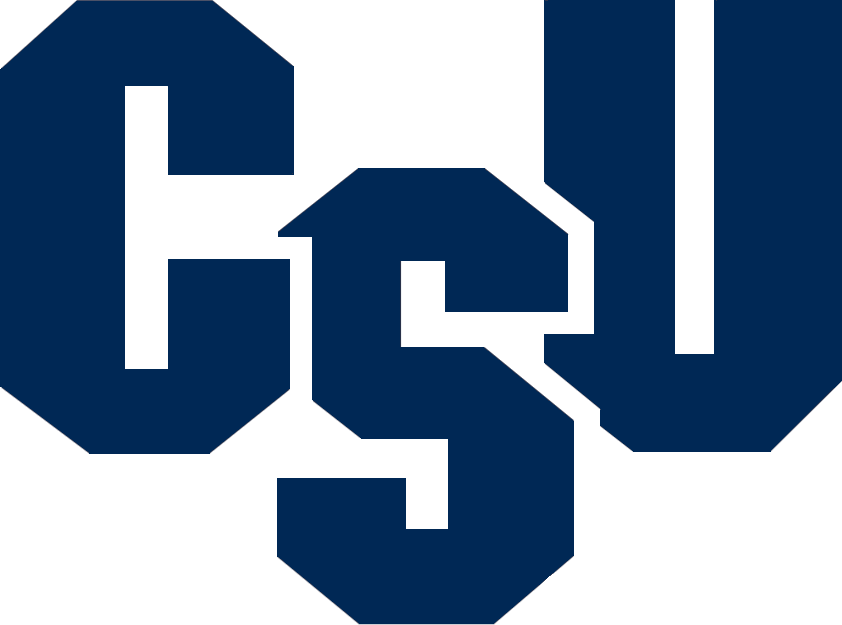
- Conference: Big South Conference
- Record: 11–19 (8–8 Big South)
- Head coach: Clarisse White (3rd season)
- Associate head coach: Marc Wilson
- Assistant coaches: Ashley Reddick; Amir Gilliam
- Home arena: Buccaneer Field House

2023–24 Big South women's basketball standings
	Conf.				Overall
Team	W		L	PCT	W		L	PCT
High Point	14	–	2	.875	20	–	12	.625
USC Upstate	10	–	6	.625	16	–	16	.500
Radford	9	–	7	.563	15	–	18	.455
Charleston Southern	8	–	8	.500	11	–	19	.367
Presbyterian †	8	–	8	.500	21	–	15	.583
Winthrop	8	–	8	.500	14	–	16	.467
Longwood	6	–	10	.375	9	–	21	.300
Gardner–Webb	5	–	11	.313	6	–	24	.200
UNC Asheville	4	–	12	.250	11	–	20	.355
† 2024 Big South tournament winner

The 2023–24 Charleston Southern Buccaneers women's basketball team represented Charleston Southern University during the 2023–24 NCAA Division I women's basketball season. The Buccaneers, led by third-year head coach Clarisse White, played their home games at the Buccaneer Field House in North Charleston, South Carolina as members of the Big South Conference. They finished the season 11–19, 8–8 in Big South play, to finish in a three-way tie for fourth place. They were defeated by eventual tournament champions Presbyterian in the quarterfinals of the Big South tournament.

== Previous season ==
The Buccaneers finished the 2022–23 season 5–25, 3–15 in Big South play, to finish in last (tenth) place. As the #10 seed in the Big South tournament, they were defeated by #7 seed USC Upstate in the first round.

== Roster ==
2023–24 Charleston Southern Buccaneers women's basketball team
Players
Coaches

Pos.	#	Name	Height	Year	Previous school	Hometown
G	0	Mya Dotson	5 ft 10 in (1.78 m)	Fr	Lewisville High School	Lewisville, TX
G	1	Catherine Alben	5 ft 7 in (1.7 m)	So	Grayson High School	Snellville, GA
G	4	Caelan Ellis	5 ft 6 in (1.68 m)	So	Buffalo	Powder Springs, GA
G	10	Jordan Berry	5 ft 8 in (1.73 m)	GS	Ole Miss	New Orleans, LA
G	11	Alba Garcia	6 ft 0 in (1.83 m)	So	IES Ortega y Gasset	Madrid, Spain
F	12	Keshunti Nichols	6 ft 0 in (1.83 m)	Jr	Pearl River Community College	Pearl, MS
G	15	Alaina Nettles	5 ft 7 in (1.7 m)	Fr	Cane Bay High School	Anchorage, AK
G/F	20	Madison Adamson	6 ft 1 in (1.85 m)	Jr	Air Force	Hoover, AL
G/F	21	Shimei Muhammad	6 ft 1 in (1.85 m)	Jr	Chipola College	Brooklyn, NY
F	22	Saniya Jones	6 ft 5 in (1.96 m)	So	Duluth High School	Duluth, GA
G	23	Maya Robinson	5 ft 9 in (1.75 m)	Fr	N.C. Good Better Best Academy	Raleigh, NC
F	24	Kennedi Jackson	6 ft 4 in (1.93 m)	RS Sr	Oklahoma State	New Orleans, LA
G	35	Laura Ortega-Mora	5 ft 10 in (1.78 m)	Jr	Highland Community College	San Fernando, Spain

Head coach

- Clarisse White (Villanova)

Assistant coach(es)

- Marc Wilson (Minnesota)
- Ashley Reddick (Oklahoma Wesleyan)
- Amir Gilliam (Northeastern State)

Legend

- (C) Team captain
- (S) Suspended
- (I) Ineligible
- (W) Walk-on
- Injured
- Current redshirt

Roster
Last update: January 9, 2024

== Schedule and results ==
Date time, TV	Rank^{#}	Opponent^{#}	Result	Record	High points	High rebounds	High assists	Site (attendance) city, state
Non-conference regular season
November 6, 2023*; 6:00 p.m., ACCNX		at No. 18 Florida State	L 63–99	0–1	19 – Garcia	8 – Adamson	5 – Berry	Donald L. Tucker Center (1,930); Tallahassee, FL
November 10, 2023*; 7:00 p.m., ACCNX		at Clemson	L 55–85	0–2	16 – Alben	11 – Adamson	3 – Nettles	Littlejohn Coliseum (1,116); Clemson, SC
November 14, 2023*; 6:00 p.m., ESPN+		Furman	L 68–71	0–3	21 – 2 tied	6 – 2 tied	4 – Alben	Buccaneer Field House (208); North Charleston, SC
November 17, 2023*; 6:00 p.m., ESPN+		Charleston	L 60–70	0–4	17 – Jackson	9 – 3 tied	6 – Berry	Buccaneer Field House (721); North Charleston, SC
November 22, 2023*; 4:00 p.m., ESPN+		at Coastal Carolina	L 60–78	0–5	23 – Alben	6 – Jones	4 – 2 tied	HTC Center (496); Conway, SC
November 25, 2023*; 2:00 p.m., ESPN+		Mercer	W 66–53	1–5	25 – Jackson	12 – Jackson	6 – Berry	Buccaneer Field House (102); North Charleston, SC
November 30, 2023*; 11:00 a.m., ESPN+		at South Florida	L 35–81	1–6	11 – Jackson	7 – Jones	3 – Nettles	Yuengling Center (9,574); Tampa, FL
December 2, 2023*; 2:00 p.m., ESPN+		South Carolina State	W 68–58	2–6	18 – Alben	7 – 2 tied	5 – Adamson	Buccaneer Field House (329); North Charleston, SC
December 6, 2023*; 6:00 p.m., ESPN+		at East Tennessee State	L 52–79	2–7	25 – Alben	10 – Adamson	4 – Alben	Brooks Gymnasium (378); Johnson City, TN
December 14, 2023*; 11:00 a.m., ESPN+		at Georgia Southern	L 59–81	2–8	17 – Alben	10 – Adamson	4 – Nettles	Hanner Fieldhouse (2,808); Statesboro, GA
December 18, 2023*; 6:00 p.m., ESPN+		Charlotte	L 60–65	2–9	19 – Alben	7 – Adamson	4 – Berry	Buccaneer Field House (143); North Charleston, SC
December 21, 2023*; 1:00 p.m., ESPN+		at East Carolina	L 46–75	2–10	16 – Nichols	10 – Adamson	4 – Robinson	Williams Arena (1,092); Greenville, NC
December 30, 2023*; 2:00 p.m., ESPN+		Francis Marion	W 69–56	3–10	17 – Alben	16 – Adamson	5 – Adamson	Buccaneer Field House (413); North Charleston, SC
Big South regular season
January 3, 2024; 6:30 p.m., ESPN+		at Presbyterian	W 61–57	4–10 (1–0)	24 – Alben	7 – Adamson	3 – Berry	Templeton Physical Education Center (194); Clinton, SC
January 6, 2024; 2:00 p.m., ESPN+		Longwood	L 57–66	4–11 (1–1)	21 – Jackson	8 – Muhammad	2 – 3 tied	Buccaneer Field House (324); North Charleston, SC
January 10, 2024; 6:00 p.m., ESPN+		Gardner–Webb	W 83–61	5–11 (2–1)	27 – Jackson	17 – Adamson	4 – Alben	Buccaneer Field House (347); North Charleston, SC
January 13, 2024; 4:00 p.m., ESPN+		at USC Upstate	L 58–59	5–12 (2–2)	17 – Adamson	12 – Adamson	2 – 2 tied	G. B. Hodge Center (287); Spartanburg, SC
January 20, 2024; 2:00 p.m., ESPN+		High Point	L 57–74	5–13 (2–3)	23 – Jackson	10 – Jackson	6 – Nettles	Buccaneer Field House (297); North Charleston, SC
January 24, 2024; 6:00 p.m., ESPN+		at Winthrop	W 63–54	6–13 (3–3)	17 – Nichols	7 – Adamson	3 – Adamson	Winthrop Coliseum (287); Rock Hill, SC
January 27, 2024; 2:00 p.m., ESPN+		UNC Asheville	L 59–62	6–14 (3–4)	17 – Jackson	7 – Adamson	4 – Berry	Buccaneer Field House; North Charleston, SC
January 31, 2024; 6:00 p.m., ESPN+		Radford	W 73–58	7–14 (4–4)	21 – Alben	9 – Adamson	4 – Jackson	Buccaneer Field House (297); North Charleston, SC
February 3, 2024; 2:00 p.m., ESPN+		at Longwood	L 56–63	7–15 (4–5)	20 – Jackson	9 – 2 tied	3 – 3 tied	Joan Perry Brock Center (807); Farmville, VA
February 7, 2024; 6:00 p.m., ESPN+		Winthrop	W 65–50	8–15 (5–5)	14 – Jackson	7 – Alben	4 – Alben	Buccaneer Field House (289); North Charleston, SC
February 14, 2024; 7:00 p.m., ESPN+		at Gardner–Webb	W 76–69	9–15 (6–5)	26 – Alben	9 – Adamson	4 – Adamson	Paul Porter Arena (152); Boiling Springs, NC
February 17, 2024; 2:00 p.m., ESPN+		at UNC Asheville	L 63–68 ^{OT}	9–16 (6–6)	18 – Muhammad	11 – Adamson	3 – Adamson	Kimmel Arena (583); Asheville, NC
February 21, 2024; 6:00 p.m., ESPN+		USC Upstate	W 66–59	10–16 (7–6)	15 – Jackson	7 – Jackson	4 – Jackson	Buccaneer Field House (221); North Charleston, SC
February 24, 2024; 2:00 p.m., ESPN+		at High Point	L 46–63	10–17 (7–7)	16 – Jackson	7 – 2 tied	3 – Berry	Qubein Center (1,384); High Point, NC
February 28, 2024; 7:00 p.m., ESPN+		at Radford	L 68–81	10–18 (7–8)	26 – Jackson	9 – 2 tied	5 – Muhammad	Dedmon Center (627); Radford, VA
March 2, 2024; 2:00 p.m., ESPN+		Presbyterian	W 68–49	11–18 (8–8)	21 – Jackson	8 – 2 tied	3 – 2 tied	Buccaneer Field House (207); North Charleston, SC
Big South tournament
March 7, 2024; 2:00 p.m., ESPN+	(4)	vs. (5) Presbyterian; Quarterfinals	L 51–54	11–19	12 – Muhammad	7 – Adamson	5 – Berry	Qubein Center; High Point, NC
*Non-conference game. ^{#}Rankings from AP poll. (#) Tournament seedings in parentheses. All times are in Eastern.
