= 2023–24 Radford Highlanders women's basketball team =

American college basketball season

2023–24 Radford Highlanders women's basketball
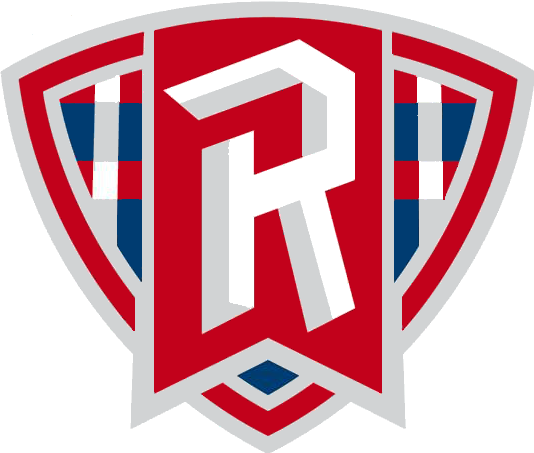
- Conference: Big South Conference
- Record: 13–17 (9–7 Big South)
- Head coach: Mike McGuire (11th season)
- Assistant coaches: Amber Easter; Alex Tomlinson; Morgan Williams
- Home arena: Dedmon Center

2023–24 Big South women's basketball standings
	Conf.				Overall
Team	W		L	PCT	W		L	PCT
High Point	14	–	2	.875	20	–	12	.625
USC Upstate	10	–	6	.625	16	–	16	.500
Radford	9	–	7	.563	15	–	18	.455
Charleston Southern	8	–	8	.500	11	–	19	.367
Presbyterian †	8	–	8	.500	21	–	15	.583
Winthrop	8	–	8	.500	14	–	16	.467
Longwood	6	–	10	.375	9	–	21	.300
Gardner–Webb	5	–	11	.313	6	–	24	.200
UNC Asheville	4	–	12	.250	11	–	20	.355
† 2024 Big South tournament winner

The 2023–24 Radford Highlanders women's basketball team represented Radford University during the 2023–24 NCAA Division I women's basketball season. The Highlanders, led by 11th-year head coach Mike McGuire, played their home games at the Dedmon Center in Radford, Virginia as members of the Big South Conference.

The Highlanders finished the season 13–17, 9–7 in Big South play, to finish in third place. They defeated Winthrop and USC Upstate, before falling to Presbyterian in the Big South tournament championship game.

== Previous season ==
The Highlanders finished the 2022–23 season 14–17, 9–9 in Big South play, to finish in a tie for fourth place. As the #4 seed in the Big South tournament, they defeated #5 seed Presbyterian in the quarterfinals, before falling to top-seeded and eventual tournament champions Gardner–Webb in the semifinals.

== Roster ==
2023–24 Radford Highlanders women's basketball team
Players
Coaches

Pos.	#	Name	Height	Year	Previous school	Hometown
G	1	Pa'Shence Traylor-Walker	5 ft 8 in (1.73 m)	So	Central Arizona College	Franklin, IN
G	2	Reniya Jones	5 ft 7 in (1.7 m)	Jr	UT Arlington	Washington, D.C.
G	3	Maci Rhoades	5 ft 11 in (1.8 m)	So	Beavercreek High School	Beavercreek, OH
G	4	Joi Williams	5 ft 5 in (1.65 m)	Fr	Virginia Academy	Ashburn, VA
G	5	Olivia Wagner	5 ft 7 in (1.7 m)	So	St. Anne's-Belfield School	Crozet, VA
G	11	Ashlyn Traylor-Walker	5 ft 8 in (1.73 m)	So	Franklin Community High School	Franklin, IN
G	12	Arshae Jackson	5 ft 10 in (1.78 m)	Fr	James River High School	Church Hill, VA
F	15	Terissa Lavoile-Brice	6 ft 0 in (1.83 m)	Fr	Winston-Salem Christian School	Saint-Laurent, QC
G	21	Adelyn Traylor-Walker	5 ft 8 in (1.73 m)	Jr	Bella Vista Preparatory School	Franklin, IN
F	22	Taniya Hanner	6 ft 1 in (1.85 m)	GS	Albany	Hillside, NJ
F	23	Kirby Brown	6 ft 0 in (1.83 m)	Jr	Roane State Community College	Hixson, TN
G	30	Bria Beverly	5 ft 11 in (1.8 m)	Jr	Millersville	Dallastown, PA
G	33	Ellie Taylor	5 ft 10 in (1.78 m)	Sr	Northern Kentucky	Bardstown, KY
C	52	Emma Fox	6 ft 4 in (1.93 m)	So	Newton-Conover High School	Newton, NC

Head coach

- Mike McGuire (Roanoke)

Assistant coach(es)

- Amber Easter (George Mason)
- Alex Tomlinson (Wingate)
- Morgan Williams (Georgetown)

Legend

- (C) Team captain
- (S) Suspended
- (I) Ineligible
- (W) Walk-on
- Injured
- Current redshirt

Roster
Last update: January 8, 2024

== Schedule and results ==
Date time, TV	Rank^{#}	Opponent^{#}	Result	Record	High points	High rebounds	High assists	Site (attendance) city, state
Exhibition
November 2, 2023*; 7:00 p.m.		Bridgewater	W 77–40	–	–	–	–	Dedmon Center; Radford, VA
Non-conference regular season
November 6, 2023*; 7:00 p.m., ESPN+		Concord	W 77–53	1–0	15 – As. Traylor-Walker	13 – Lavoile-Brice	3 – As. Traylor-Walker	Dedmon Center (829); Radford, VA
November 9, 2023*; 7:00 p.m., ESPN+		at Western Carolina	W 67–49	2–0	25 – As. Traylor-Walker	12 – As. Traylor-Walker	4 – As. Traylor-Walker	Ramsey Center (428); Cullowhee, NC
November 12, 2023*; 2:00 p.m., ESPN+		Norfolk State	L 46–70	2–1	9 – 2 tied	7 – Lavoile-Brice	3 – Lavoile-Brice	Dedmon Center (808); Radford, VA
November 15, 2023*; 11:30 a.m., ESPN+		East Tennessee State	L 45–49	2–2	13 – As. Traylor-Walker	9 – Lavoile-Brice	4 – Taylor	Dedmon Center (3,000); Radford, VA
November 18, 2023*; 2:00 p.m., ESPN+		UNC Greensboro	L 60–63	2–3	20 – As. Traylor-Walker	7 – 2 tied	4 – Wagner	Dedmon Center (653); Radford, VA
November 23, 2023*; 11:00 a.m.		vs. Indiana State; Puerto Rico Clasico	L 52–64	2–4	18 – As. Traylor-Walker	9 – Lavoile-Brice	5 – As. Traylor-Walker	Coliseo Rubén Rodríguez (100); Bayamón, PR
November 24, 2023*; 11:00 a.m.		vs. Northern Illinois; Puerto Rico Clasico	L 55–72	2–5	19 – As. Traylor-Walker	7 – Lavoile-Brice	3 – 2 tied	Coliseo Rubén Rodríguez (100); Bayamón, PR
November 29, 2023*; 6:00 p.m., B1G+		at Penn State	L 47–97	2–6	14 – As. Traylor-Walker	4 – 2 tied	2 – 2 tied	Bryce Jordan Center (1,830); University Park, PA
December 2, 2023*; 2:00 p.m., ESPN+		at Niagara	L 53–64	2–7	16 – Hanner	8 – As. Traylor-Walker	3 – Taylor	Gallagher Center (402); Lewiston, NY
December 10, 2023*; 2:00 p.m., ACCNX		at No. 15 Virginia Tech	L 40–85	2–8	16 – As. Traylor-Walker	6 – Rhoades	1 – 4 tied	Cassell Coliseum (5,062); Blacksburg, VA
December 13, 2023*; 6:00 p.m., ESPN+		at Liberty	W 57–45	3–8	22 – As. Traylor-Walker	8 – As. Traylor-Walker	5 – As. Traylor-Walker	Liberty Arena (603); Lynchburg, VA
December 17, 2023*; 2:00 p.m., ESPN+		Queens	W 62–46	4–8	14 – As. Traylor-Walker	12 – Lavoile-Brice	3 – 2 tied	Dedmon Center (647); Radford, VA
December 21, 2023*; 12:00 p.m., FloHoops		at Charleston	L 50–74	4–9	16 – As. Traylor-Walker	13 – Hanner	4 – As. Traylor-Walker	TD Arena (333); Charleston, SC
December 31, 2023*; 2:00 p.m., SECN		at Vanderbilt	L 53–80	4–10	18 – As. Traylor-Walker	8 – Williams	2 – 2 tied	Memorial Gymnasium (1,843); Nashville, TN
Big South regular season
January 3, 2024; 7:00 p.m., ESPN+		at High Point	W 65–61	5–10 (1–0)	27 – As. Traylor-Walker	9 – As. Traylor-Walker	6 – Williams	Qubein Center (978); High Point, NC
January 10, 2024; 7:00 p.m., ESPN+		Longwood	W 64–59	6–10 (2–0)	23 – Wagner	11 – Hanner	5 – Lavoile-Brice	Dedmon Center (661); Radford, VA
January 13, 2024; 2:00 p.m., ESPN+		Winthrop	W 63–55	7–10 (3–0)	14 – Pa. Traylor-Walker	11 – Hanner	4 – As. Traylor-Walker	Dedmon Center (741); Radford, VA
January 17, 2024; 7:00 p.m., ESPN+		at Gardner–Webb	W 80–71	8–10 (4–0)	16 – 2 tied	12 – Lavoile-Brice	4 – As. Traylor-Walker	Paul Porter Arena (115); Boiling Springs, NC
January 20, 2024; 4:00 p.m., ESPN+		at USC Upstate	L 60–65	8–11 (4–1)	17 – As. Traylor-Walker	8 – 2 tied	5 – Taylor	G. B. Hodge Center (377); Spartanburg, SC
January 24, 2024; 7:00 p.m., ESPN+		UNC Asheville	W 59–46	9–11 (5–1)	22 – Hanner	11 – 2 tied	3 – 2 tied	Dedmon Center (833); Radford, VA
January 27, 2024; 2:00 p.m., ESPN+		Presbyterian	W 65–40	10–11 (6–1)	19 – Pa. Traylor-Walker	10 – Hanner	7 – As. Traylor-Walker	Dedmon Center; Radford, VA
January 31, 2024; 6:00 p.m., ESPN+		at Charleston Southern	L 58–73	10–12 (6–2)	22 – As. Traylor-Walker	6 – As. Traylor-Walker	3 – Taylor	Buccaneer Field House (297); North Charleston, SC
February 3, 2024; 2:00 p.m., ESPN+		USC Upstate	W 67–61 ^{OT}	11–12 (7–2)	19 – Wagner	7 – 2 tied	4 – Taylor	Dedmon Center (804); Radford, VA
February 10, 2024; 2:00 p.m., ESPN+		at Presbyterian	L 50–57	11–13 (7–3)	13 – As. Traylor-Walker	12 – Hanner	5 – Wagner	Templeton Physical Education Center (375); Clinton, SC
February 14, 2024; 6:00 p.m., ESPN+		at Winthrop	L 51–54 ^{OT}	11–14 (7–4)	12 – Lavoile-Brice	9 – Hanner	2 – 4 tied	Winthrop Coliseum (367); Rock Hill, SC
February 17, 2024; 2:00 p.m., ESPN+		High Point	L 50–67	11–15 (7–5)	15 – Hanner	12 – Hanner	3 – Wagner	Dedmon Center (769); Radford, VA
February 21, 2024; 7:00 p.m., ESPN+		Gardner–Webb	L 58–63	11–16 (7–6)	20 – Hanner	15 – Hanner	3 – 2 tied	Dedmon Center (744); Radford, VA
February 24, 2024; 7:00 p.m., ESPN+		at Longwood	L 45–66	11–17 (7–7)	14 – As. Traylor-Walker	9 – Hanner	1 – 4 tied	Joan Perry Brock Center (1,453); Farmville, VA
February 28, 2024; 7:00 p.m., ESPN+		Charleston Southern	W 81–68	12–17 (8–7)	18 – As. Traylor-Walker	8 – Lavoile-Brice	5 – As. Traylor-Walker	Dedmon Center (627); Radford, VA
March 2, 2024; 2:00 p.m., ESPN+		at UNC Asheville	W 55–54	13–17 (9–7)	19 – As. Traylor-Walker	8 – Lavoile-Brice	2 – 2 tied	Kimmel Arena (592); Asheville, NC
Big South tournament
March 7, 2024; 8:00 p.m., ESPN+	(3)	vs. (6) Winthrop; Quarterfinals	W 64–51	14–17	22 – As. Traylor-Walker	6 – Hanner	3 – 2 Tied	Qubein Center (1,023); High Point, NC
March 9, 2024; 8:00 p.m., ESPN+	(3)	vs. (2) USC Upstate; Semifinals	W 61–45	15–17	18 – As. Traylor-Walker	9 – Lavoile-Brice	4 – 2 Tied	Qubein Center (1,528); High Point, NC
March 10, 2024; 6:00 p.m., ESPN2	(3)	vs. (5) Presbyterian; Championship	L 37–60	15–18	14 – As. Traylor-Walker	8 – As. Traylor-Walker	2 – 2 Tied	Qubein Center (756); High Point, NC
*Non-conference game. ^{#}Rankings from AP poll. (#) Tournament seedings in parentheses. All times are in Eastern.
