= 2023–24 Clemson Tigers women's basketball team =

Women's college basketball season

2023–24 Clemson Tigers women's basketball
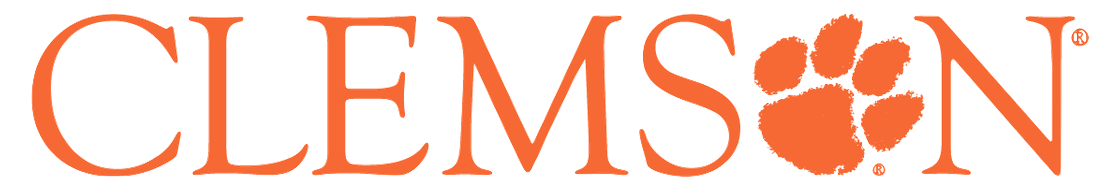
- Conference: Atlantic Coast Conference
- Record: 12–19 (5–13 ACC)
- Head coach: Amanda Butler (6th season)
- Assistant coaches: Joy Smith (6th season); Daniel Barber (6th season); Darrick Gibbs (2st season)
- Home arena: Littlejohn Coliseum

2023–24 ACC women's basketball standings
	Conf.				Overall
Team	W		L	PCT	W		L	PCT
No. 18 Virginia Tech	14	–	4	.778	25	–	8	.758
No. 4 NC State	13	–	5	.722	31	–	7	.816
No. 20 Syracuse	13	–	5	.722	24	–	8	.750
No. 11 Notre Dame †	13	–	5	.722	28	–	7	.800
Louisville	12	–	6	.667	24	–	10	.706
Florida State	12	–	6	.667	23	–	11	.676
No. 17 Duke	11	–	7	.611	22	–	12	.647
North Carolina	11	–	7	.611	20	–	13	.606
Miami (FL)	8	–	10	.444	19	–	12	.613
Georgia Tech	7	–	11	.389	17	–	16	.515
Virginia	7	–	11	.389	16	–	16	.500
Clemson	5	–	13	.278	12	–	19	.387
Boston College	5	–	13	.278	14	–	19	.424
Wake Forest	2	–	16	.111	7	–	25	.219
Pittsburgh	2	–	16	.111	8	–	24	.250
† 2024 ACC tournament winner Rankings from AP poll

The 2023–24 Clemson Tigers women's basketball team represented Clemson University during the 2023–24 college basketball season. The Tigers were led by sixth-year head coach Amanda Butler. The Tigers, members of the Atlantic Coast Conference, played their home games at Littlejohn Coliseum.

Clemson started the season with three straight wins, but ended their streak with a loss to rival South Carolina. They won their next game before only winning one of three games at their early season tournament, the Van Chancellor Classic. They lost to Auburn in the ACC–SEC Challenge before having an early season ACC game. They upset Duke in that December ACC game. In their remaining non-conference games, the Tigers won two and lost one. They had a final non-conference record of 7–5, with two of those five losses being to ranked teams. They lost their next seven ACC regular season games, with five of those losses being to teams ranked at the time, and one to Syracuse, who became ranked the week after facing Clemson. The Tigers won their next three games. However, they could not keep the streak going, losing to Miami in overtime and to Georgia Tech by just one point. Their losing streak continued to five games before they defeated Wake Forest in the penultimate game of the season. In the final game of the season, they took Florida State to overtime, but could not prevail in the extra period.

The Tigers finished the season 13–18 overall and 5–13 in ACC play to finish in a tie for twelfth place. As the twelfth seed in the ACC tournament, they lost to Boston College in the first round. They were not invited to the NCAA tournament or the WBIT. After the season, Clemson parted ways with head coach Amanda Butler.

== Previous season ==
The Tigers finished the season 19–16 and 7–11 in ACC play to finish in tenth place. As the tenth seed in the ACC tournament, they defeated fifteenth seed Pittsburgh in the first round before losing to seventh seed North Carolina in the second round. They received an at-large invitation to the WNIT. The Tigers defeated High Point in the first round and Auburn in the second round before losing to Florida in the Super 16 to end their season.

== Offseason ==
=== Departures ===
Departures
Name	Number	Pos.	Height	Year	Hometown	Reason for departure
Brie Perpignan	0	G	5'8"	Graduate student	Upper Marlboro, Maryland	Graduated
Taylor Thompson	1	G	5'7"	Junior	Greenville, South Carolina	—
Daisha Bradford	2	G	5'8"	Senior	Mobile, Alabama	Transferred to Louisiana-Monroe
Weronika Hipp	4	G	5'8"	Junior	Ostrów Wielkopolski, Poland	Medically retired
Tadassa Brown	11	F	6'3"	Freshman	Lansing, Michigan	Transferred to Texas Southern
Hannah Hank	12	F	6'2"	Senior	Port Lincoln, Australia	Graduated
Kionna Gaines	15	G	5'9"	Sophomore	Columbus, Georgia	Transferred to Auburn
Ale'jah Douglas	24	G	5'6"	Junior	Omaha, Nebraska	Transferred to Oklahoma State
Sydney Standifer	25	G	5'7"	Sophomore	Argyle, Texas	Medically retired

=== Incoming transfers ===
Incoming transfers
Name	Number	Pos.	Height	Year	Hometown	Previous school
Mackenzie Kramer	0	G	5'9"	Senior	St. Michael, Minnesota	Lehigh
Dayshanette Harris	1	G	5'7"	Graduate student	Youngstown, Ohio	Pittsburgh
Nya Valentine	2	G	5'3"	Junior	Mobile, Alabama	Shelton State Community College
Maddi Cluse	11	G	5'10"	Junior	Sagamore Hills, Ohio	Miami (OH)
Danna Grenald	23	F	6'2"	Junior	Tegucigalpa, Honduras	New Mexico Junior College
Danielle Rauch	33	G	5'8"	Graduate student	Syracuse, New York	Michigan
Amani Freeman	34	F	6'2"	Graduate student	Avon, Indiana	Miami (OH)

=== 2023 recruiting class ===
College recruiting
Name	Hometown	School	Height	Weight	Commit date
Kylee Kellermann; G	Charleston, South Carolina	Philip Simmons	5 ft 5 in (1.65 m)	N/A	
Kylee Kellermann; G	Recruit ratings: No ratings found				
Bella Ranallo; G	Lake Forest, Illinois	Lake Forest	5 ft 6 in (1.68 m)	N/A	
Bella Ranallo; G	Recruit ratings: No ratings found				
Overall recruit ranking:
Note: In many cases, Scout, Rivals, 247Sports, On3, and ESPN may conflict in their listings of height and weight.; In these cases, the average was taken. ESPN grades are on a 100-point scale.; Sources:

== Roster ==
2023–24 Clemson Tigers women's basketball team
Players
Coaches

Pos.	#	Name	Height	Year	Previous school	Hometown
G	0	Mackenzie Kramer	5 ft 9 in (1.75 m)	Sr	St. Michael-Albertville; Lehigh	St. Michael, MN
G	1	Dayshanette Harris	5 ft 7 in (1.7 m)	GS	Ursuline; Pittsburgh	Youngstown, OH
G	2	Nya Valentine	5 ft 3 in (1.6 m)	Jr	McGill–Toolen; Shelton State Community College	Mobile, AL
F	3	Makayla Elmore	6 ft 3 in (1.91 m)	Jr	Hopewell-Loudon	Fostoria, OH
F	5	Amari Robinson	6 ft 0 in (1.83 m)	GS	Douglas County	Douglasville, GA
G	10	Kylee Kellermann	5 ft 6 in (1.68 m)	Fr	Philip Simmons	Charleston, SC
G	11	Maddi Cluse	5 ft 10 in (1.78 m)	Jr	Nordonia; Miami (OH)	Sagamore Hills, OH
G	13	Bella Ranallo	5 ft 6 in (1.68 m)	Fr	Lake Forest	Lake Forest, IL
C	21	Eno Inyang	6 ft 2 in (1.88 m)	Jr	Saint Cloud	St. Cloud, FL
G	22	Ruby Whitehorn	5 ft 11 in (1.8 m)	So	Detroit Edison	Detroit, MI
G	30	Madi Ott	5 ft 10 in (1.78 m)	Jr	Frisco Centennial	Frisco, TX
G	33	Danielle Rauch	5 ft 8 in (1.73 m)	GS	Bishop Ludden; Michigan	Syracuse, NY
F	34	Amani Freeman	6 ft 2 in (1.88 m)	GS	Avon; Miami (OH)	Avon, IN

Head coach

- Amanda Butler (Florida)

Assistant coach(es)

- Joy Smith (Duke)
- Daniel Barber (Florida)
- Darrick Gibbs (Wofford)

Legend

- (C) Team captain
- (S) Suspended
- (I) Ineligible
- (W) Walk-on
- Injured
- Current redshirt

Roster
Last update: December 22, 2023

== Schedule ==
Date time, TV	Rank^{#}	Opponent^{#}	Result	Record	High points	High rebounds	High assists	Site (attendance) city, state
Regular season
November 6, 2023*; 11:00 a.m., ACCNX		Winthrop	W 71–41	1–0	22 – Robinson	7 – Tied	4 – Rauch	Littlejohn Coliseum (5,234); Clemson, SC
November 10, 2023*; 7:00 p.m., ACCNX		Charleston Southern	W 85–55	2–0	21 – Robinson	9 – Robinson	10 – Harris	Littlejohn Coliseum (1,116); Clemson, SC
November 12, 2023*; 2:00 p.m., ACCNX		Mercer	W 90–66	3–0	19 – Robinson	7 – Tied	5 – Harris	Littlejohn Coliseum (822); Clemson, SC
November 16, 2023*; 7:00 p.m., SECN		at No. 1 South Carolina; Rivalry	L 40–109	3–1	11 – Cluse	6 – Tied	2 – Tied	Colonial Life Arena (16,820); Columbia, SC
November 19, 2023*; 3:30 p.m., ACCNX		Longwood	W 102–61	4–1	20 – Harris	7 – Elmore	8 – Robinson	Littlejohn Coliseum (815); Clemson, SC
November 24, 2023*; 7:00 p.m., ESPN+		vs. No. 25 Mississippi State; Van Chancellor Classic	L 78–81	4–2	20 – Whitehorn	6 – Whitehorn	9 – Harris	Merrell Center (257); Katy, TX
November 25, 2023*; 7:00 p.m., ESPN+		vs. Tulsa; Van Chancellor Classic	L 64–74	4–3	29 – Robinson	9 – Elmore	5 – Cluse	Merrell Center (567); Katy, TX
November 26, 2023*; 4:15 p.m., ESPN+		vs. Arkansas–Pine Bluff; Van Chancellor Classic	W 92–66	5–3	15 – Tied	11 – Elmore	6 – Harris	Merrell Center (217); Katy, TX
November 30, 2023*; 9:00 p.m., SECN		at Auburn; ACC–SEC Challenge	L 53–83	5–4	14 – Harris	10 – Elmore	3 – Rauch	Neville Arena (2,388); Auburn, AL
December 7, 2023; 7:00 p.m., ACCN		Duke	W 80–64	6–4 (1–0)	22 – Robinson	7 – Robinson	5 – Harris	Littlejohn Coliseum (910); Clemson, SC
December 16, 2023*; 2:00 p.m., ACCNX		Georgia State	L 72–78	6–5	35 – Robinson	7 – Robinson	5 – Harris	Littlejohn Coliseum (770); Clemson, SC
December 19, 2023*; 1:00 p.m., ACCNX		Air Force	W 70–54	7–5	17 – Whitehorn	8 – Robinson	3 – Elmore	Littlejohn Coliseum (870); Clemson, SC
December 22, 2023*; 2:00 p.m., ACCNX		East Tennessee State	W 73–50	8–5	18 – Whitehorn	8 – Robinson	5 – Whitehorn	Littlejohn Coliseum (890); Clemson, SC
December 31, 2023; 12:00 p.m., ACCNX		at No. 24 North Carolina	L 76–82	8–6 (1–1)	21 – Robinson	11 – Elmore	5 – Harris	Carmichael Arena (3,820); Chapel Hill, NC
January 7, 2024; 4:00 p.m., ACCN		No. 22 Florida State	L 72–78	8–7 (1–2)	20 – Harris	8 – Robinson	4 – Harris	Littlejohn Coliseum (1,136); Clemson, SC
January 11, 2024; 7:00 p.m., ACCNX		at Georgia Tech	L 62–70	8–8 (1–3)	19 – Robinson	10 – Robinson	5 – Harris	McCamish Pavilion (1,319); Atlanta, GA
January 14, 2024; 2:00 p.m., ACCNX		at Syracuse	L 82–83	8–9 (1–4)	37 – Robinson	9 – Elmore	10 – Harris	JMA Wireless Dome (2,742); Syracuse, NY
January 18, 2024; 7:00 p.m., ACCNX		No. 13 Louisville	L 64–81	8–10 (1–5)	25 – Harris	8 – Robinson	7 – Harris	Littlejohn Coliseum (868); Clemson, SC
January 21, 2024; 12:00 p.m., The CW		at No. 14 Virginia Tech	L 62–74	8–11 (1–6)	25 – Harris	9 – Robinson	8 – Harris	Cassell Coliseum (6,427); Blacksburg, VA
January 25, 2024; 7:00 p.m., ACCNX		No. 7 NC State	L 49–71	8–12 (1–7)	11 – Whitehorn	9 – Robinson	3 – Whitehorn	Littlejohn Coliseum (919); Clemson, SC
January 28, 2024; 6:00 p.m., ACCN		Wake Forest	W 73–59	9–12 (2–7)	21 – Robinson	9 – Whitehorn	4 – Tied	Littlejohn Coliseum (990); Clemson, SC
February 1, 2024; 7:00 p.m., ACCNX		Boston College	W 65–55	10–12 (3–7)	19 – Whitehorn	8 – Whitehorn	3 – Tied	Littlejohn Coliseum (872); Clemson, SC
February 4, 2024; 4:00 p.m., ACCN		at Virginia	W 75–69	11–12 (4–7)	23 – Harris	9 – Whitehorn	9 – Harris	John Paul Jones Arena (4,959); Charlottesville, VA
February 8, 2024; 6:00 p.m., ACCNX		at Miami (FL)	L 72–75 ^{OT}	11–13 (4–8)	24 – Robinson	7 – Tied	6 – Harris	Watsco Center (2,391); Coral Gables, FL
February 15, 2024; 7:00 p.m., ACCNX		Georgia Tech	L 63–64	11–14 (4–9)	24 – Harris	9 – Whitehorn	7 – Harris	Littlejohn Coliseum (852); Clemson, SC
February 18, 2024; 12:00 p.m., ACCN		Pittsburgh	L 57–72	11–15 (4–10)	18 – Harris	7 – Whitehorn	4 – Harris	Littlejohn Coliseum (880); Clemson, SC
February 22, 2024; 7:00 p.m., ACCNX		at No. 19 Notre Dame	L 47–74	11–16 (4–11)	17 – Whitehorn	10 – Whitehorn	9 – Harris	Purcell Pavilion (5,596); Notre Dame, IN
February 25, 2024; 2:00 p.m., ACCNX		Miami (FL)	L 50–56	11–17 (4–12)	20 – Robinson	4 – Tied	6 – Harris	Littlejohn Coliseum (1,111); Clemson, SC
February 29, 2024; 6:00 p.m., ACCN		at Wake Forest	W 68–64	12–17 (5–12)	24 – Robinson	9 – Whitehorn	6 – Harris	LJVM Coliseum (910); Winston-Salem, NC
March 3, 2024; 4:00 p.m., ACCN		at Florida State	L 79–82 ^{OT}	12–18 (5–13)	22 – Harris	14 – Whitehorn	4 – Tied	Donald L. Tucker Center (2,445); Tallahassee, FL
ACC Women's Tournament
March 6, 2024; 1:00 p.m., ACCN	(12)	vs. (13) Boston College; First Round	L 72–85	12–19	26 – Tied	6 – Whitehorn	4 – Harris	Greensboro Coliseum (6,322); Greensboro, NC
*Non-conference game. ^{#}Rankings from AP Poll. (#) Tournament seedings in parentheses. All times are in Eastern.

== Rankings ==
+ Regular season polls	Poll	Pre- season	Week 2	Week 3	Week 4	Week 5	Week 6	Week 7	Week 8	Week 9	Week 10	Week 11	Week 12	Week 13	Week 14	Week 15	Week 16	Week 17	Week 18	Week 19	Week 20	Final
AP	NR	NR	NR	NR	NR	NR	NR	NR	NR	NR	NR	NR	NR	NR	NR	NR	NR	NR	NR	NR	NR	
Coaches	NR	NR	NR	NR	NR	NR	NR	NR	NR	NR	NR	NR	NR	NR	NR	NR	NR	NR	NR	NR	NR	

Legend
	Increase in ranking
	Decrease in ranking
	Not ranked previous week
(RV)	Received votes
(NR)	Not ranked

== Statistics ==
Player	GP	GS	MPG	FG%	3P%	FT%	RPG	APG	PPG
Amari Robinson	31	31	30.9	53.0%	35.4%	79.1%	6.6	1.4	17.3
Dayshanette Harris	31	31	26.7	43.6%	32.9%	71.5%	3.7	5.0	14.2
Ruby Whitehorn	31	29	28.7	46.4%	27.5%	69.2%	5.6	1.6	12.3
Mackenzie Kramer	23	10	23.9	40.3%	36.4%	92.3%	1.5	1.0	8.3
Maddi Cluse	13	13	22.6	43.5%	33.3%	47.2%	4.2	1.2	7.5
MaKayla Elmore	31	28	25.6	37.2%	31.9%	57.1%	5.6	1.3	4.3
Eno Inyang	28	3	13.8	35.6%	—	78.9%	2.2	0.3	2.8
Nya Valentine	31	0	12.3	32.2%	34.2%	80.0%	0.7	0.8	2.8
Amani Freenman	29	0	10.2	56.9%	—	59.4%	1.6	0.5	2.7
Danielle Rauch	23	2	16.4	27.1%	26.7%	80.0%	1.7	1.5	2.7
Madi Ott	30	8	16.6	26.7%	27.0%	60.0%	1.7	1.1	2.4
Bella Ranallo	7	0	1.2	25.0%	33.3%	—	0.1	0.3	0.4
Kylee Kellermann	7	0	1.2	0.0%	0.0%	—	0.3	0.0	0.0
