= 2023–24 Winthrop Eagles women's basketball team =

American college basketball season

2023–24 Winthrop Eagles women's basketball
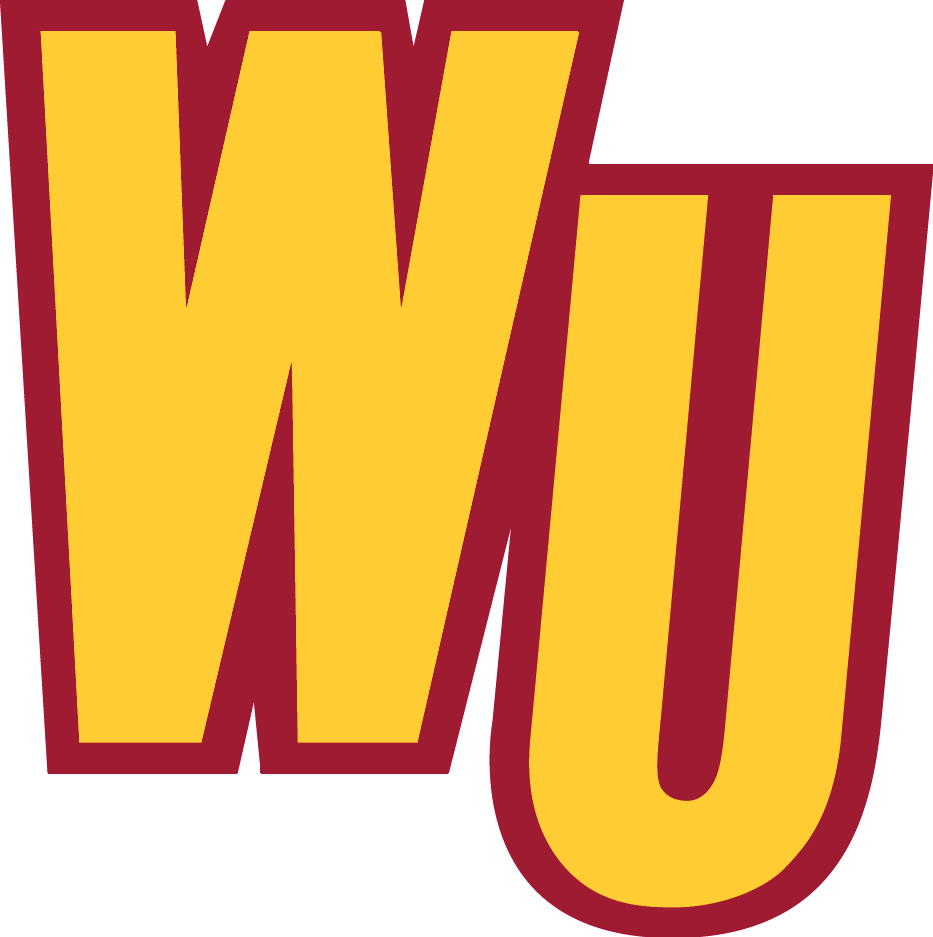
- Conference: Big South Conference
- Record: 14–16 (8–8 Big South)
- Head coach: Semeka Randall Lay (4th season)
- Assistant coaches: AnnMarie Gilbert; Necole Sterling; Dante Travis
- Home arena: Winthrop Coliseum

2023–24 Big South women's basketball standings
	Conf.				Overall
Team	W		L	PCT	W		L	PCT
High Point	14	–	2	.875	20	–	12	.625
USC Upstate	10	–	6	.625	16	–	16	.500
Radford	9	–	7	.563	15	–	18	.455
Charleston Southern	8	–	8	.500	11	–	19	.367
Presbyterian †	8	–	8	.500	21	–	15	.583
Winthrop	8	–	8	.500	14	–	16	.467
Longwood	6	–	10	.375	9	–	21	.300
Gardner–Webb	5	–	11	.313	6	–	24	.200
UNC Asheville	4	–	12	.250	11	–	20	.355
† 2024 Big South tournament winner

The 2023–24 Winthrop Eagles women's basketball team represented Winthrop University during the 2023–24 NCAA Division I women's basketball season. The Eagles, led by fourth-year head coach Semeka Randall Lay, played their home games at the Winthrop Coliseum in Rock Hill, South Carolina as members of the Big South Conference.

== Previous season ==
The Eagles finished the 2022–23 season 8–22, 6–12 in Big South play to finish in ninth place. As the #9 seed in the Big South tournament, they were defeated by #8 seed UNC Asheville in the first round.

== Roster ==
2023–24 Winthrop Eagles women's basketball team
Players
Coaches

Pos.	#	Name	Height	Year	Previous school	Hometown
SG	0	Ar'Mani Reid	5 ft 9 in (1.75 m)	Fr	Southwest Onslow High School	Jacksonville, North Carolina
F	1	Claudia Clement	6 ft 3 in (1.91 m)	Fr	Escola Pia Balmes	Barcelona, Spain
G/F	3	Ronaltha Marc	5 ft 10 in (1.78 m)	Jr	Northwest Florida State College	Miami, Florida
F	4	Marissa Gasaway	5 ft 11 in (1.8 m)	Jr	Northwest Florida State College	Louisville, Kentucky
F	5	Prunelle Mungo	6 ft 1 in (1.85 m)	Jr	Oakland	Philadelphia, Pennsylvania
G	10	Jada Ryce	5 ft 5 in (1.65 m)	Jr	East Tennessee State	McDonough, Georgia
F	11	Blessing Okoh	6 ft 0 in (1.83 m)	Sr	North Carolina Central	Houston, Texas
PG	12	Leonor Paisana	5 ft 7 in (1.7 m)	Jr	Escola Secundaria Antonio Damasio	Lisbon, Portugal
C	13	Tiana Spann	6 ft 1 in (1.85 m)	RS Fr	First Baptist High School	Charleston, South Carolina
G	15	Frances Brown	5 ft 10 in (1.78 m)	Sr	Nassau Community College	Valley Stream, New York
G	20	Katie Reed	5 ft 9 in (1.75 m)	Fr	Rock Hill High School	Rock Hill, South Carolina
F	23	Elli Garnett	5 ft 11 in (1.8 m)	RS Jr	Eastern Florida State College	Golden, Colorado
G	24	Nyah Stallings	5 ft 9 in (1.75 m)	GS	Liberty	Greensboro, North Carolina
G	30	Adelaide McLeod	5 ft 9 in (1.75 m)	Fr	Champaign Central High School	Savoy, Illinois
PG	41	Angel Burgos	5 ft 8 in (1.73 m)	GS	Richmond	Richmond, Virginia

Head coach

- Semeka Randall Lay (Tennessee)

Assistant coach(es)

- AnnMarie Gilbert (Oberlin)
- Necole Sterling (Miami (FL))
- Dante Travis (Saint Paul's)

Legend

- (C) Team captain
- (S) Suspended
- (I) Ineligible
- (W) Walk-on
- Injured
- Current redshirt

Roster
Last update: January 6, 2024

== Schedule and results ==
Date time, TV	Rank^{#}	Opponent^{#}	Result	Record	High points	High rebounds	High assists	Site (attendance) city, state
Non-conference regular season
November 6, 2023*; 11:00 am, ACCNX		at Clemson	L 41–71	0–1	10 – Marc	9 – Gasaway	2 – 2 Tied	Littlejohn Coliseum; Clemson, SC
November 10, 2023*; 5:30 pm, SECN+		at Alabama	L 50–79	0–2	20 – Okoh	12 – Gasaway	5 – Ryce	Coleman Coliseum (1,234); Tuscaloosa, AL
November 14, 2023*; 6:00 pm, ESPN+		Erskine	W 84–43	1–2	19 – Ryce	11 – Gasaway	5 – Paisana	Winthrop Coliseum (185); Rock Hill, SC
November 18, 2023*; 2:00 pm		at South Carolina State	W 54–45	2–2	9 – 2 Tied	17 – Gasaway	6 – Ryce	SHM Memorial Center (150); Orangeburg, SC
November 21, 2023*; 11:00 am, ESPN+		St. Augustine's	W 62–55	3–2	14 – Paisana	10 – Okoh	5 – Ryce	Winthrop Coliseum (1,607); Rock Hill, SC
November 24, 2023*; 5:30 pm, P12N		vs. Texas A&M; Raising the B.A.R. Invitational	L 32–84	3–3	6 – 2 Tied	6 – 2 Tied	2 – 3 Tied	Haas Pavilion (1,074); Berkeley, CA
November 25, 2023*; 3:00 pm, P12N		vs. San Jose State; Raising the B.A.R. Invitational	W 56–49	4–3	14 – Paisana	8 – Gasaway	4 – 2 Tied	Haas Pavilion (163); Berkeley, CA
November 29, 2023*; 6:00 pm, ESPN+		UNC Wilmington	L 58–66 ^{OT}	4–4	20 – Gasaway	16 – Gasaway	5 – Ryce	Winthrop Coliseum (312); Rock Hill, SC
December 3, 2023*; 2:00 pm, ESPN+		Queens	L 61–64	4–5	19 – Gasaway	9 – Gasaway	7 – Burgos	Winthrop Coliseum (215); Rock Hill, SC
December 10, 2023*; 4:00 pm, ESPN+		Carolina	W 77–52	5–5	16 – Gasaway	10 – Gasaway	4 – Burgos	Winthrop Coliseum (221); Rock Hill, SC
December 14, 2023*; 6:00 pm, ESPN+		Georgia State	W 65–60	6–5	20 – Paisana	10 – Gasaway	4 – Okoh	Winthrop Coliseum (211); Rock Hill, SC
December 20, 2023*; 12:00 pm, ESPN+		at North Florida	L 49–55	6–6	17 – Marc	6 – 2 Tied	3 – Burgos	UNF Arena (283); Jacksonville, FL
December 30, 2023*; 3:45 pm, ESPN+		at Florida	L 36–73	6–7	13 – Okoh	7 – Gasaway	2 – Paisana	O'Connell Center (1,289); Gainesville, FL
Big South regular season
January 3, 2024; 7:00 pm, ESPN+		at Longwood	W 58–53	7–7 (1–0)	21 – Ryce	10 – Gasaway	3 – Ryce	Joan Perry Brock Center (777); Farmville, VA
January 6, 2024; 2:00 pm, ESPN+		USC Upstate	L 51–52	7–8 (1–1)	9 – 3 Tied	11 – Gasaway	2 – 2 Tied	Winthrop Coliseum (145); Rock Hill, SC
January 10, 2024; 6:00 pm, ESPN+		Presbyterian	L 43–59	7–9 (1–2)	13 – Marc	8 – Gasaway	3 – 2 Tied	Winthrop Coliseum (285); Rock Hill, SC
January 13, 2024; 2:00 pm, ESPN+		at Radford	L 55–63	7–10 (1–3)	16 – Stallings	6 – Gasaway	2 – 2 Tied	Dedmon Center (741); Radford, VA
January 17, 2024; 6:30 pm, ESPN+		at UNC Asheville	W 70–64 ^{OT}	8–10 (2–3)	17 – Ryce	15 – Gasaway	3 – Ryce	Kimmel Arena (500); Asheville, NC
January 20, 2024; 2:00 pm, ESPN+		Gardner–Webb	W 61–50	9–10 (3–3)	13 – 2 Tied	7 – Paisana	6 – 2 Tied	Winthrop Coliseum (218); Rock Hill, SC
January 24, 2024; 6:00 pm, ESPN+		Charleston Southern	L 54–63	9–11 (3–4)	15 – Ryce	5 – Gasaway	3 – 2 Tied	Winthrop Coliseum (287); Rock Hill, SC
January 27, 2024; 7:00 pm, ESPN+		at High Point	L 68–75	9–12 (3–5)	22 – Ryce	16 – Gasaway	4 – Paisana	Qubein Center (1,505); High Point, NC
February 3, 2024; 2:00 pm, ESPN+		UNC Asheville	W 65–56	10–12 (4–5)	18 – Ryce	15 – Gasaway	6 – Paisana	Winthrop Coliseum (391); Rock Hill, SC
February 7, 2024; 6:00 pm, ESPN+		at Charleston Southern	L 50–65	10–13 (4–6)	14 – Ryce	5 – Okoh	3 – Paisana	Buccaneer Field House (289); North Charleston, SC
February 10, 2024; 2:00 pm, ESPN+		Longwood	W 55–54	11–13 (5–6)	13 – Gasaway	14 – Gasaway	4 – Ryce	Winthrop Coliseum (426); Rock Hill, SC
February 14, 2024; 6:00 pm, ESPN+		Radford	W 54–51 ^{OT}	12–13 (6–6)	13 – Stallings	15 – Gasaway	1 – 4 Tied	Winthrop Coliseum (367); Rock Hill, SC
February 21, 2024; 6:30 pm, ESPN+		at Presbyterian	L 40–62	12–14 (6–7)	11 – Gasaway	9 – Gasaway	2 – 2 Tied	Templeton Physical Education Center (273); Clinton, SC
February 24, 2024; 4:00 pm, ESPN+		at USC Upstate	W 67–61	13–14 (7–7)	15 – 2 Tied	10 – Gasaway	2 – 2 Tied	G. B. Hodge Center (285); Spartanburg, SC
February 28, 2024; 6:00 pm, ESPN+		High Point	L 64–65	13–15 (7–8)	18 – Gasaway	18 – Gasaway	2 – 3 Tied	Winthrop Coliseum (284); Rock Hill, SC
March 2, 2024; 1:00 pm, ESPN+		at Gardner–Webb	W 72–54	14–15 (8–8)	18 – Ryce	14 – Gasaway	5 – Paisana	Paul Porter Arena (369); Boiling Springs, NC
Big South tournament
March 7, 2024; 8:00 pm, ESPN+	(6)	vs. (3) Radford; Quarterfinals	L 51-64	14-16	14 – Stallings	18 – Gasaway	3 – 2 Tied	Qubein Center (1,023); High Point, NC
*Non-conference game. ^{#}Rankings from AP Poll. (#) Tournament seedings in parentheses. All times are in Eastern.
