= 2023–24 Longwood Lancers women's basketball team =

American college basketball season

2023–24 Longwood Lancers women's basketball
- Conference: Big South Conference
- Record: 9–21 (6–10 Big South)
- Head coach: Erika Lang-Montgomery (2nd season)
- Assistant coaches: Landis F. McCoy; Jess Pham
- Home arena: Joan Perry Brock Center

2023–24 Big South women's basketball standings
	Conf.				Overall
Team	W		L	PCT	W		L	PCT
High Point	14	–	2	.875	20	–	12	.625
USC Upstate	10	–	6	.625	16	–	16	.500
Radford	9	–	7	.563	15	–	18	.455
Charleston Southern	8	–	8	.500	11	–	19	.367
Presbyterian †	8	–	8	.500	21	–	15	.583
Winthrop	8	–	8	.500	14	–	16	.467
Longwood	6	–	10	.375	9	–	21	.300
Gardner–Webb	5	–	11	.313	6	–	24	.200
UNC Asheville	4	–	12	.250	11	–	20	.355
† 2024 Big South tournament winner

The 2023–24 Longwood Lancers women's basketball team represented Longwood University during the 2023–24 NCAA Division I women's basketball season. The Lancers, led by second-year head coach Erika Lang-Montgomery, played their home games at the newly opened Joan Perry Brock Center in Farmville, Virginia as members of the Big South Conference.

The Lancers finished the season 9–21, 6–10 in Big South play, to finish in seventh place. They were defeated by USC Upstate in the quarterfinals of the Big South tournament.

== Previous season ==
The Lancers finished the 2022–23 season 9–21, 8–10 in Big South play, to finish in sixth place. As the #6 seed in the Big South tournament, they were defeated by #3 seed Campbell in the quarterfinals.

== Roster ==
2023–24 Longwood Lancers women's basketball team
Players
Coaches

Pos.	#	Name	Height	Year	Previous school	Hometown
F	0	Otaifo Esenabhalu	6 ft 2 in (1.88 m)	Fr	Lowndes High School	Valdosta, GA
G	1	Kiki McIntyre	5 ft 6 in (1.68 m)	Jr	Saint Leo	Boston, MA
PG	2	Bailey Williams	5 ft 7 in (1.7 m)	Sr	James Madison	Midlothian, VA
G	3	Adriana Shipp-Davis	5 ft 10 in (1.78 m)	RS Sr	Deep Creek High School	Chesapeake, VA
G	10	Malea Brown	5 ft 5 in (1.65 m)	Jr	Santa Fe College	Putnam Hall, FL
G	12	Steph Davis	6 ft 0 in (1.83 m)	Sr	Holy Cross	Windham, NH
F	13	Frances Ulysse	6 ft 1 in (1.85 m)	Fr	Vanier College	Montreal, QC
F	14	Alyssa Chapman	6 ft 2 in (1.88 m)	Jr	Radford	Richmond, VA
G	20	Nalani Simmons	5 ft 8 in (1.73 m)	Fr	Deep Creek High School	Chesapeake, VA
G	21	Janay Turner	5 ft 8 in (1.73 m)	Sr	Norfolk State	Chicago, IL
F	23	Laney Bone	5 ft 11 in (1.8 m)	Jr	Cleveland State Community College	Chattanooga, TN
G	24	Amor Harris	5 ft 9 in (1.75 m)	Fr	Alexandria City High School	Alexandria, VA
G	30	Anne-Hamilton LeRoy	5 ft 10 in (1.78 m)	GS	Seneca High School	Seneca, SC

Head coach

- Erika Lang-Montgomery (Florida)

Assistant coach(es)

- Landis F. McCoy (Bethune–Cookman)
- Jess Pham (Longwood)

Legend

- (C) Team captain
- (S) Suspended
- (I) Ineligible
- (W) Walk-on
- Injured
- Current redshirt

Roster
Last update: January 11, 2024

== Schedule and results ==
Date time, TV	Rank^{#}	Opponent^{#}	Result	Record	High points	High rebounds	High assists	Site (attendance) city, state
Non-conference regular season
November 6, 2023*; 7:00 p.m., ESPN+		at American	L 68–81	0–1	15 – Shipp-Davis	7 – Bone	3 – Turner	Bender Arena (644); Washington, D.C.
November 9, 2023*; 7:00 p.m., FloHoops		at Delaware	L 55–81	0–2	16 – Turner	8 – Brown	3 – LeRoy	Bob Carpenter Center (1,115); Newark, DE
November 12, 2023*; 12:00 p.m., ESPN+		Chowan	W 88–59	1–2	20 – Brown	10 – Esenabhalu	3 – 3 tied	Joan Perry Brock Center (607); Farmville, VA
November 15, 2023*; 7:00 p.m., ESPN+		at James Madison	L 50–84	1–3	11 – LeRoy	15 – Esenabhalu	2 – 2 tied	Atlantic Union Bank Center (2,185); Harrisonburg, VA
November 19, 2023*; 3:30 p.m., ACCNX		at Clemson	L 63–102	1–4	12 – McIntyre	4 – Ulysse	3 – 4 tied	Littlejohn Coliseum (815); Clemson, SC
November 29, 2023*; 7:00 p.m., ESPN+		at Ohio	W 75–72	2–4	22 – Turner	9 – Shipp-Davis	3 – 2 tied	Convocation Center (618); Athens, OH
December 2, 2023*; 5:30 p.m., ESPN+		at Davidson	L 46–83	2–5	13 – Shipp-Davis	4 – 2 tied	2 – Williams	John M. Belk Arena (2,783); Davidson, NC
December 11, 2023*; 6:30 p.m., FloHoops		at Stony Brook	L 49–85	2–6	11 – Shipp-Davis	4 – 5 tied	2 – Shipp-Davis	Island Federal Arena (615); Stony Brook, NY
December 14, 2023*; 11:00 a.m.		at Duquesne	L 69–89	2–7	18 – Turner	6 – 2 tied	4 – LeRoy	Kerr Fitness Center (434); Pittsburgh, PA
December 17, 2023*; 1:00 p.m., FloHoops		at William & Mary	L 49–86	2–8	12 – Shipp-Davis	7 – Bone	2 – 2 tied	Kaplan Arena (1,096); Williamsburg, VA
December 20, 2023*; 12:00 p.m., ESPN+		Mid-Atlantic Christian	Canceled					Joan Perry Brock Center; Farmville, VA
December 22, 2023*; 1:00 p.m., ESPN+		Georgia Southern	L 65–87	2–9	23 – LeRoy	8 – Esenabhalu	5 – McIntyre	Joan Perry Brock Center (957); Farmville, VA
December 31, 2023*; 2:00 p.m., ESPN+		Norfolk State	L 59–76	2–10	20 – Shipp-Davis	15 – Shipp-Davis	4 – LeRoy	Joan Perry Brock Center (951); Farmville, VA
Big South regular season
January 3, 2024; 7:00 p.m., ESPN+		Winthrop	L 53–58	2–11 (0–1)	17 – Turner	9 – Esenabhalu	4 – Williams	Joan Perry Brock Center (777); Farmville, VA
January 6, 2024; 2:00 p.m., ESPN+		at Charleston Southern	W 66–57	3–11 (1–1)	18 – McIntyre	8 – Esenabhalu	2 – 2 tied	Buccaneer Field House (324); North Charleston, SC
January 10, 2024; 7:00 p.m., ESPN+		at Radford	L 59–64	3–12 (1–2)	13 – LeRoy	4 – 2 tied	3 – LeRoy	Dedmon Center (661); Radford, VA
January 13, 2024; 2:00 p.m., ESPN+		UNC Asheville	L 61–69	3–13 (1–3)	14 – McIntyre	8 – Esenabhalu	1 – 5 tied	Joan Perry Brock Center (873); Farmville, VA
January 17, 2024; 7:00 p.m., ESPN+		USC Upstate	W 66–58	4–13 (2–3)	20 – Turner	8 – Esenabhalu	7 – McIntyre	Joan Perry Brock Center (907); Farmville, VA
January 20, 2024; 2:00 p.m., ESPN+		at Presbyterian	L 66–69	4–14 (2–4)	22 – LeRoy	5 – Esenabhalu	4 – McIntyre	Templeton Physical Education Center (289); Clinton, SC
January 24, 2024; 7:00 p.m., ESPN+		at Gardner–Webb	L 59–74	4–15 (2–5)	19 – Shipp-Davis	11 – Esenabhalu	4 – Williams	Paul Porter Arena (208); Boiling Springs, NC
January 27, 2024*; 2:00 p.m., ESPN+		Regent	W 103–52	5–15	24 – Turner	15 – Esenabhalu	8 – Williams	Joan Perry Brock Center (841); Farmville, VA
January 31, 2024; 7:00 p.m., ESPN+		High Point	L 53–64	5–16 (2–6)	9 – McIntyre	8 – Brown	2 – 2 tied	Joan Perry Brock Center (1,113); Farmville, VA
February 3, 2024; 2:00 p.m., ESPN+		Charleston Southern	W 63–56	6–16 (3–6)	16 – McIntyre	7 – Brown	4 – Williams	Joan Perry Brock Center (807); Farmville, VA
February 7, 2024; 7:00 p.m., ESPN+		at USC Upstate	L 45–49	6–17 (3–7)	23 – Brown	6 – Ulysse	5 – McIntyre	G. B. Hodge Center (315); Spartanburg, SC
February 10, 2024; 2:00 p.m., ESPN+		at Winthrop	L 54–55	6–18 (3–8)	13 – Bone	10 – Bone	2 – 3 tied	Winthrop Coliseum (426); Rock Hill, SC
February 17, 2024; 2:00 p.m., ESPN+		Presbyterian	L 52–67	6–19 (3–9)	12 – McIntyre	4 – 2 tied	2 – 3 tied	Joan Perry Brock Center (1,015); Farmville, VA
February 21, 2024; 6:30 p.m., ESPN+		at UNC Asheville	W 66–60	7–19 (4–9)	16 – Brown	6 – Williams	2 – McIntyre	Kimmel Arena (238); Asheville, NC
February 24, 2024; 7:00 p.m., ESPN+		Radford	W 66–45	8–19 (5–9)	17 – Shipp-Davis	14 – Esenabhalu	5 – Brown	Joan Perry Brock Center (1,453); Farmville, VA
February 28, 2024; 7:00 p.m., ESPN+		Gardner–Webb	W 67–57	9–19 (6–9)	16 – LeRoy	16 – Esenabhalu	7 – McIntyre	Joan Perry Brock Center (873); Farmville, VA
March 2, 2024; 7:00 p.m., ESPN+		at High Point	L 58–61	9–20 (6–10)	13 – Brown	14 – Esenabhalu	3 – 2 tied	Qubein Center (1,379); High Point, NC
Big South tournament
March 7, 2024; 6:00 p.m., ESPN+	(7)	vs. (2) USC Upstate; Quarterfinals	L 37–60	9–21	11 – LeRoy	8 – Esenabhalu	2 – McIntyre	Qubein Center; High Point, NC
*Non-conference game. ^{#}Rankings from AP poll. (#) Tournament seedings in parentheses. All times are in Eastern.
