= Appalachian State Mountaineers women's basketball =

2026–27 Appalachian State Mountaineers women's basketball team
- University: Appalachian State University
- Head coach: Alaura Sharp (3rd season)
- Location: Boone, North Carolina
- Arena: Holmes Center (capacity: 8,325)
- Conference: Sun Belt
- Nickname: Mountaineers
- Colors: Black and gold

NCAA Division I tournament appearances
- 1990, 1991, 1996, 1999

Conference tournament champions
- 1987, 1988, 1990, 1991, 1996, 1999

Conference regular-season champions
- 1986, 1987, 1989, 1996, 2011, 2012

Uniforms
Home	Away

The Appalachian State Mountaineers women's basketball team is the college basketball team at Appalachian State University in Boone, North Carolina. The Mountaineers compete in the Sun Belt Conference. They are currently a Division I member of the National Collegiate Athletic Association (NCAA). Appalachian State plays their home games at the Holmes Center.

== History ==
The Mountaineers began play in 1970. They formerly played in the Southern Conference until 2014. As of the end of the 2015-16 season, they have an all-time record of 607-623. They have been to the NCAA Tournament four times, losing each time in the first round. They have appeared in the NWIT/WNIT in 1987, 2011, 2012, and 2013, going 2-6 in eight games. They played in the 2010 and 2019 WBIs, winning both championships.

== Postseason results ==
=== NCAA tournament results ===
Year	Round	Opponent	Results
1990	First Round	#6 Maryland	L 71–100
1991	First Round	#5 Florida State	L 57–96
1996	First Round	#4 Alabama	L 66–95
1999	First Round	#1 Tennessee	L 54–113

=== WNIT Tournament results ===
Year	Round	Opponent	Results
1987	First Round; Second Round Consolation; Third Round Consolation	California; Stephen F. Austin; DePaul	L 99–109; L 80-81; L 82-88
2011	First Round	South Carolina	L 54–67
2012	First Round; Second Round; Third Round	UNC-Wilmington; North Carolina State; Virginia	W 79–73; W 66-62; L 58-74
2013	First Round	Charlotte	L 61–79

=== WBI Tournament results ===
Year	Round	Opponent	Results
2010	First Round; Quarterfinals; Semifinals; Championship	Charleston Southern; Fairfield; College of Charleston; Memphis	W 62–47; W 59-36; W 77-58; W 79-71
2019	First Round; Quarterfinals; Semifinals; Championship	UNC-Asheville; Marshall; Campbell; North Texas	W 57–55; W 83-71; W 70-57; W 76-59
