= 2024 Big South Conference women's basketball tournament =

American collegiate sporting event

- Classification: Division I
- Season: 2023–24
- Teams: 9
- Site: Qubein Center; High Point, North Carolina
- Champions: Presbyterian (1st title)
- Winning coach: Alaura Sharp (1st title)
- Television: ESPN+, ESPN2

2023–24 Big South women's basketball standings
| | Conf. | | | | Overall |
| Team | W | | L | PCT | W | | L | PCT |
|---|---|---|---|---|---|---|---|---|
| High Point | 14 | – | 2 | .875 | 20 | – | 12 | .625 |
| USC Upstate | 10 | – | 6 | .625 | 16 | – | 16 | .500 |
| Radford | 9 | – | 7 | .563 | 15 | – | 18 | .455 |
| Charleston Southern | 8 | – | 8 | .500 | 11 | – | 19 | .367 |
| Presbyterian † | 8 | – | 8 | .500 | 21 | – | 15 | .583 |
| Winthrop | 8 | – | 8 | .500 | 14 | – | 16 | .467 |
| Longwood | 6 | – | 10 | .375 | 9 | – | 21 | .300 |
| Gardner–Webb | 5 | – | 11 | .313 | 6 | – | 24 | .200 |
| UNC Asheville | 4 | – | 12 | .250 | 11 | – | 20 | .355 |
† 2024 Big South tournament winner

The 2024 Big South women's basketball tournament was the postseason women's basketball tournament that will end the 2023–24 NCAA Division I women's basketball season of the Big South Conference. It was held from March 6–10 and played at the Qubein Center. The tournament winner will receive the automatic bid to the 2024 NCAA tournament.

== Seeds ==
All of the conference teams competed in the tournament. The top seven teams received a first-round bye. Teams were seeded by record within the conference, with a tiebreaker system to seed teams with identical conference records.

The tiebreakers operate in the following order:

1. Head-to-head record.
2. Record against the top-ranked conference team not involved in the tie, going down the standings until the tie is broken. For this purpose, teams with the same conference record are considered collectively. If two teams were unbeaten or winless against an opponent but did not play the same number of games against that opponent, the tie is not considered broken.

| Seed | School | Conference | Overall | Tiebreaker |
|---|---|---|---|---|
| 1 | High Point | 14–2 | 19–10 | |
| 2 | USC Upstate | 10–6 | 15–14 | |
| 3 | Radford | 9–7 | 13–17 | |
| 4 | Charleston Southern | 8–8 | 11–18 | 4–0 vs. Presbyterian/Winthrop |
| 5 | Presbyterian | 8–8 | 17–14 | 2–0 vs. Winthrop |
| 6 | Winthrop | 8–8 | 14–15 | 0–2 vs. Presbyterian |
| 7 | Longwood | 6–10 | 9–20 | |
| 8 | Gardner–Webb | 5–11 | 6–23 | |
| 9 | UNC Asheville | 4–12 | 10–19 | |

== Schedule ==
| Game | Time* | Matchup | Score | Channel |
Opening Round - Wednesday, March 6
| 1 | 6:00 pm | No. 8 Gardner–Webb vs No. 9 UNC Asheville | 74–75 | ESPN+ |
Quarterfinals - Thursday, March 7
| 2 | 11:30 am | No. 1 High Point vs No. 9 UNC Asheville | 70–57* | ESPN+ |
| 3 | 2:00 pm | No. 4 Charleston Southern vs No. 5 Presbyterian | 51–54 | ESPN+ |
| 4 | 6:00 pm | No. 2 USC Upstate vs. No. 7 Longwood | 60-37 | ESPN+ |
| 5 | 8:00 pm | No. 3 Radford vs No. 6 Winthrop | 64–51 | ESPN+ |
Semifinals - Saturday, March 9
| 6 | 6:00 pm | No. 1 High Point vs No. 5 Presbyterian | 50–59 | ESPN+ |
| 7 | 8:00 pm | No. 2 USC Upstate vs No. 3 Radford | 45–61 | ESPN+ |
Championship - Sunday, March 10
| 8 | 6:00 pm | No. 5 Presbyterian vs No. 3 Radford | 60–37 | ESPN2 |
*Game times in ET

== Bracket ==
Opening Round; Wednesday, March 6 ESPN+
8 | Gardner–Webb | 74
9 | UNC Asheville | 75

Quarterfinals; Thursday, March 7 ESPN+
1 | High Point | 70*
9 | UNC Asheville | 57
4 | Charleston Southern | 51
5 | Presbyterian | 54
2 | USC Upstate | 60
7 | Longwood | 37
3 | Radford | 64
6 | Winthrop | 51

Semifinals; Saturday, March 9 ESPN+
1 | High Point | 50
5 | Presbyterian | 59
2 | USC Upstate | 45
3 | Radford | 61

Championship; Sunday, March 10; ESPN2
5 | Presbyterian | 60
3 | Radford | 37

* = Denotes overtime period.
