= Presbyterian Blue Hose women's basketball =

Presbyterian Blue Hose
| 2024–25 Presbyterian Blue Hose women's basketball team |
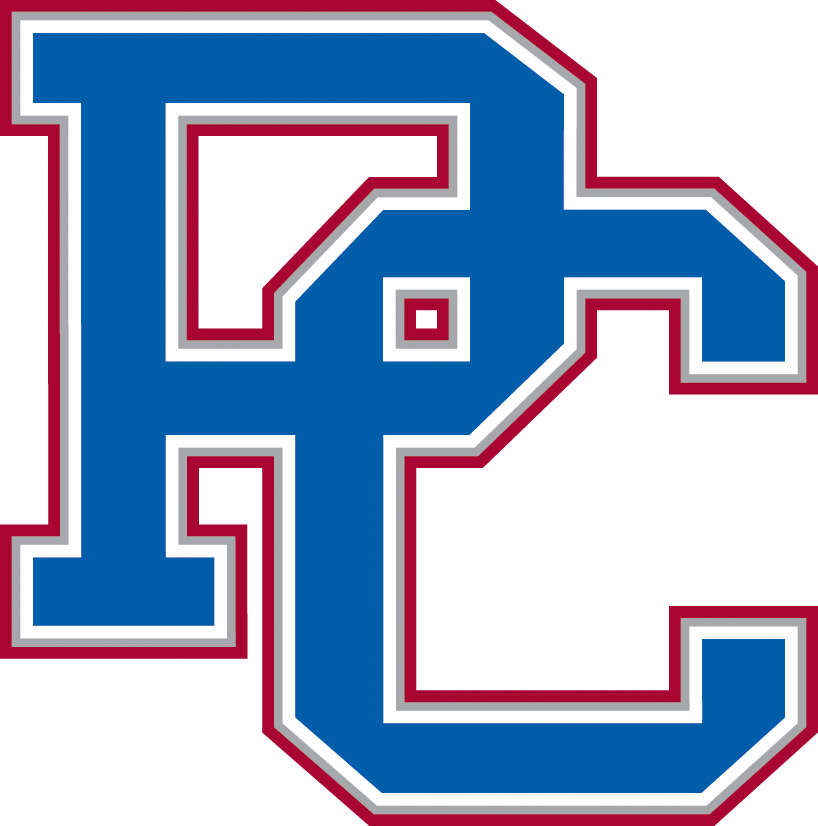
- University: Presbyterian College
- Head coach: Tiffany Sardin (2nd season)
- Location: Clinton, South Carolina
- Arena: Templeton Physical Education Center (capacity: 2,300)
- Conference: Big South
- Nickname: Blue Hose
- Colors: Blue and garnet

NCAA Division I tournament second round
- Division II: 1994, 1998, 2000

NCAA Division I tournament appearances
- Division II: 1994, 1995, 1998, 1999, 2000, 2002; Division I: 2024

Conference tournament champions
- South Atlantic: 1995, 1998, 1999, 2000; Big South: 2024

The Presbyterian Blue Hose women's basketball team represents Presbyterian College in Clinton, South Carolina, United States. It currently competes in the Big South Conference.

== History ==
Presbyterian began play in 1977. They made six NCAA Division II Tournament appearances in their time in Division II (1994, 1995, 1998, 1999, 2000, 2002), winning two games in their tenure. They began play in Division I in 2007.

== Team record ==
Statistics overview
| Season | Coach | Overall | Conference | Standing | Postseason |
|---|---|---|---|---|---|
Jessica Vanco (Independent) (2007–2008)
| 2007–08 | Jessica Vanco | 2–24 | | | |
| Jessica Vanco: | | 2–24 | | | |
Ronny Fisher (Big South Conference) (2008–2016)
| 2008–09 | Ronny Fisher | 4–25 | 1–15 | | |
| 2009–10 | Ronny Fisher | 5–25 | 3–13 | | |
| 2010–11 | Ronny Fisher | 9–20 | 5–11 | | |
| 2011–12 | Ronny Fisher | 14–15 | 8–10 | | |
| 2012–13 | Ronny Fisher | 19–12 | 14–4 | | |
| 2013–14 | Ronny Fisher | 12–19 | 9–11 | | |
| 2014–15 | Ronny Fisher | 16–15 | 10–10 | | |
| 2015–16 | Ronny Fisher | 18–13 | 13–7 | | |
| Ronny Fisher: | | 97–144 | 63–81 | | |
Todd Steelman (Big South Conference) (2016–2018)
| 2016–17 | Todd Steelman | 13–18 | 10–8 | | |
| 2017–18 | Todd Steelman | 12–18 | 9–9 | | |
| Todd Steelman: | | 25–36 | 19–17 | | |
Alaura Sharp (Big South Conference) (2018–2024)
| 2018–19 | Alaura Sharp | 7–24 | 4–14 | | |
| 2019–20 | Alaura Sharp | 12–18 | 7–13 | | NCAA Tournament canceled |
| 2020–21 | Alaura Sharp | 11–10 | 10–8 | | |
| 2021–22 | Alaura Sharp | 12–18 | 6–12 | | |
| 2022–23 | Alaura Sharp | 13–17 | | | |
| 2023–24 | Alaura Sharp | 21–14 | Big South | 1st Place | Big South Conference |
| Alaura Sharp: | | 76–101 | 27–47 | | |
| Total: | | | | | |
National champion Postseason invitational champion Conference regular season champion Conference regular season and conference tournament champion Division regular season champion Division regular season and conference tournament champion Conference tournament champion

== Postseason ==
=== NCAA Division I tournament results ===
The Blue Hose appeared in their first NCAA Division I women's basketball tournament in 2024. Their combined record is 1–1.

| Year | Round | Opponent | Result |
|---|---|---|---|
| 2024 | First Four; First Round | Sacred Heart; South Carolina | W, 49–42; L, 39-91 |

=== NCAA Division II tournament results ===
The Blue Hose made six appearances in the NCAA Division II women's basketball tournament. They had a combined record of 1–6.

| Year | Round | Opponent | Result |
|---|---|---|---|
| 1994 | First round | Wingate | L, 63–64 |
| 1995 | First round | Longwood | L, 72–78 |
| 1998 | First round Regional semifinals | Virginia Union; Bowie State | W, 74–65; L, 59–63 |
| 1999 | First round | Wingate | L, 76–77 |
| 2000 | Regional semifinals | Francis Marion | L, 79–82 |
| 2002 | First round | Virginia State | L, 56–65 |
