= USC Upstate Spartans women's basketball =

USC Upstate Spartans
2025–26 USC Upstate Spartans women's basketball team
- University: University of South Carolina Upstate
- Head coach: Jason Williams (4th season)
- Location: Valley Falls, South Carolina
- Arena: G. B. Hodge Center (capacity: 818)
- Conference: Big South
- Nickname: Spartans
- Colors: Green, white, and black

NCAA Division II tournament round of 32
- 1994, 1995

NCAA Division II tournament appearances
- 1993, 1994, 1995, 2006

Conference tournament champions
- 1994, 1995 (Peach Belt)

Conference regular-season champions
- 1993, 1994, 1995 (Peach Belt)

Uniforms
Home	Away	Alternate

The USC Upstate Spartans women's basketball team, formerly known as the USC Spartanburg Spartans women's basketball team, represents the University of South Carolina Upstate in Spartanburg, South Carolina, United States. The school's team currently competes in the Big South Conference.

== History ==
The Spartans began play in 1976. As of the end of the 2015–16 season, they have an all-time record of 545–572. They played in NAIA District Six from 1982 to 1990 and in the Peach Belt Conference from 1990 to 2007.

== Postseason ==
=== NCAA Division II tournament results ===
The Spartans, then known as the USC Spartanburg Spartans, made four appearances in the NCAA Division II women's basketball tournament. They had a combined record of 2–4.

Year	Round	Opponent	Result
1993	First Round; Regional Finals	Saint Augustine's; Norfolk State	W, 71–69; L, 68–75
1994	First Round	Norfolk State	L, 66–82
1995	First Round; Regional Finals	Longwood; Wingate	W, 73–53; L, 63–82
2006	First Round	Wingate	L, 59–67
