= 2022–23 Ohio Bobcats women's basketball team =

Intercollegiate basketball season

2022–23 Ohio Bobcats women's basketball
- Conference: Mid-American Conference
- Record: 6–22 (4–13 MAC)
- Head coach: Bob Boldon (10th season)
- Assistant coaches: Tavares Jackson; Steph Haas; Chelsea Welch
- Home arena: Convocation Center

2022–23 Mid-American Conference women's basketball standings
| | Conf. | | | | Overall |
| Team | W | | L | PCT | W | | L | PCT |
|---|---|---|---|---|---|---|---|---|
| Toledo† | 16 | – | 2 | .889 | 29 | – | 5 | .853 |
| Bowling Green | 14 | – | 4 | .778 | 30 | – | 6 | .833 |
| Ball State | 14 | – | 4 | .778 | 26 | – | 8 | .765 |
| Kent State | 12 | – | 6 | .667 | 21 | – | 11 | .656 |
| Akron | 8 | – | 10 | .444 | 17 | – | 13 | .567 |
| Northern Illinois | 8 | – | 10 | .444 | 16 | – | 17 | .485 |
| Eastern Michigan | 7 | – | 11 | .389 | 15 | – | 15 | .500 |
| Buffalo | 7 | – | 11 | .389 | 12 | – | 16 | .429 |
| Western Michigan | 7 | – | 11 | .389 | 12 | – | 17 | .414 |
| Miami (OH) | 7 | – | 11 | .389 | 12 | – | 19 | .387 |
| Central Michigan | 4 | – | 14 | .222 | 6 | – | 23 | .207 |
| Ohio | 4 | – | 14 | .222 | 6 | – | 23 | .207 |
† 2023 MAC tournament winner As of March 24, 2023

The 2022–23 Ohio Bobcats women's basketball team represented Ohio University during the 2022–23 NCAA Division I women's basketball season. The Bobcats, led by tenth-year head coach Bob Boldon, played their home games at the Convocation Center in Athens, Ohio as a member of the Mid-American Conference (MAC). They finished 6–23 and 4–14 in MAC play, to finish tied for eleventh in the MAC. They failed to qualify for the MAC tournament.

== Previous season ==
The Bobcats finished the 2021–22 season 15–13 and 9–10 in the MAC. They were knocked out of the MAC tournament in the quarterfinals by top-seeded Toledo and in the first round of the WNIT by South Dakota State. During a conference win at Central Michigan on January 15, Cece Hooks passed Caroline Mast as the all-time leading scorer in Ohio basketball history. Two games later, against Bowling Green, she passed Toledo's Kim Knuth as the all-time leading scorer in MAC basketball history.

== Offseason ==
=== Coaching staff changes ===
==== Coaching departures ====
2022–23 coaching departures
| Name | Alma mater | Previous position | New position |
|---|---|---|---|
| Marwan Miller | Franklin University | Assistant coach | Assistant coach (Minnesota) |

==== Coaching additions ====
2022–23 coaching additions
| Name | Alma mater | Previous position | New position |
|---|---|---|---|
| Chelsea Welch | Wright State University | Assistant coach (Albright) | Assistant coach |
| Kaylee Bambule | Ohio University | Player | Video coordinator |

=== Departures ===
2022–23 departures
| Name | Number | Pos. | Height | Year | Hometown | Reason |
|---|---|---|---|---|---|---|
| Cece Hooks | 1 | G | 5' 8" | Senior | Dayton, OH | Graduated, exhausted eligibility |
| Erica Johnson | 4 | G | 5' 11" | RS-Junior | Mansfield, OH | Graduated |
| Kaylee Bambule | 13 | G | 5' 8" | RS-Junior | Plainfield, IL | Graduated |
| Hunter Rogan | 25 | G | 5' 8" | Senior | Urbana, OH | Graduated, exhausted eligibility |
| Gabby Burris | 41 | F | 5' 11" | Senior | Baltimore, OH | Graduated, exhausted eligibility |

=== Incoming transfers ===
2022–23 incoming transfers
| Name | Number | Pos. | Height | Year | Hometown | Reason |
|---|---|---|---|---|---|---|
| Kailah Johnson | 10 | G | 5' 8" | Junior | Holland, OH | Transferred from Edison State. Will have two years of eligibility remaining. |

=== 2022 recruiting class ===
Recruiting class
| Name | Number | Pos. | Height | High school | Hometown |
|---|---|---|---|---|---|
| Jaya McClure | 0 | G | 5' 6" | Christian Academy | Louisville, KY |
| Aja Austin | 24 | F | 6' 1" | | Westerville, OH |
| Cassidy Lafler | 41 | G | | Dublin Coffman | Dublin, OH |

== Preseason ==
Prior to the season Ohio was picked seventh in the MAC preseason poll. No Bobcats were named to the preseason All-MAC team.

=== Preseason rankings ===
MAC preseason poll
| Predicted finish | Team | Votes (1st place) |
|---|---|---|
| 1 | Toledo | 143 (11) |
| 2 | Ball State | 130 (1) |
| 3 | Bowling Green | 109 |
| 4 | Kent State | 103 |
| 5 | Northern Illinois | 99 |
| 6 | Western Michigan | 91 |
| 7 | Ohio | 61 |
| 8 | Akron | 50 |
| 9 | Eastern Michigan | 46 |
| 10 | Buffalo | 40 |
| 11 | Miami | 35 |
| 12 | Central Michigan | 29 |

MAC tournament champion: Toledo (9), Ball State (3) Source:

== Roster ==
2022–23 Ohio Bobcats women's basketball team
Players
Coaches

| Pos. | # | Name | Height | Year | Previous school | Hometown |
|---|---|---|---|---|---|---|
| G | 5 | Caitlyn Kroll | 5 ft 10 in (1.78 m) | RS Sr | Bridgeport; Saint Francis (PA) | Bridgeport, OH |
| F | 20 | Abby Garnett | 6 ft 1 in (1.85 m) | RS Jr | Golden | Golden, CO |
| F | 35 | Alexandra Antonova | 6 ft 2 in (1.88 m) | RS Jr | Teays Valley | Moscow, Russia |
| G | 23 | Jasmine Hale | 5 ft 9 in (1.75 m) | RS Jr | West Clemont | Cincinnati, OH |
| F | 4 | Ella Pope | 5 ft 11 in (1.8 m) | RS So | Timpview | Orem, UT |
| G | 11 | Peyton Guice | 5 ft 11 in (1.8 m) | Jr | Westerville South | Westerville, OH |
| G | 3 | Madi Mace | 5 ft 11 in (1.8 m) | RS So | Parkersburg | Parkersburg, WV |
| G | 14 | Kate Dennis | 6 ft 1 in (1.85 m) | So | Guilford | Rockford, IL |
| G | 22 | Kendall Hale | 5 ft 11 in (1.8 m) | So | West Clemont | Cincinnati, OH |
| G | 2 | Yaya Felder | 5 ft 8 in (1.73 m) | So | Conard | Hartford, CT |
| G | 10 | Kailah Johnson | 5 ft 8 in (1.73 m) | Jr | Notre Dame Academy | Holland, OH |
| G | 0 | Jaya McClure | 5 ft 6 in (1.68 m) | Fr | Christian Academy | Louisville, KY |
| F | 24 | Aja Austin | 6 ft 1 in (1.85 m) | Fr | | Westerville, OH |
| G | 41 | Cassidy Lafler | — | Fr | Dublin Coffman | Dublin, OH |

Head coach

- Bob Boldon (Walsh)

Assistant coach(es)

- Tavares Jackson (Minnesota)
- Steph Haas (Florida Gulf Coast)
- Chelsea Welch (Wright State)

Legend

- (C) Team captain
- (S) Suspended
- (I) Ineligible
- (W) Walk-on
- Injured
- Current redshirt

Roster
Last update: September 16, 2024

=== Support staff ===
2022–23 Ohio Bobcats support staff
- Ebony Pegues – Director of basketball operations
- Kaylee Bambule – Video coordinator
- Tyler Johnson – Graduate assistant
- Yonah Dori – Graduate assistant
- Ben Gilkey – Assistant strength and conditioning coach
- Meg Christenson – Athletic communications coordinator
- Paige Ciminello – Associate athletic trainer
- Jessica Arquette – Sports dietitian
- Kaitlyn Michener – Nutritionist
- Hannah Rastatter – Nutritionist

== Schedule ==
| Date time, TV | Rank^{#} | Opponent^{#} | Result | Record | High points | High rebounds | High assists | Site (attendance) city, state |
Non-conference regular season
| November 7, 2022*; 7:00 p.m., ESPN3 | | LIU | L 67–74 | 0–1 | 15 – Kroll | 8 – 2 tied | 5 – McClure | Convocation Center (955); Athens, OH |
| November 10, 2022*; 7:00 p.m., ESPN+ | | at Longwood | L 65–66 | 0–2 | 12 – 2 tied | 6 – Kroll | 5 – Felder | Willett Hall (474); Farmville, VA |
| November 17, 2022*; 7:00 p.m., ESPN+ | | No. 8 Ohio State | L 56–86 | 0–3 | 21 – Felder | 9 – Kroll | 4 – Felder | Convocation Center (4,285); Athens, OH |
| November 20, 2022*; 2:00 p.m., ESPN+ | | at IUPUI | L 86–97 | 0–4 | 26 – Felder | 10 – Kroll | 5 – Kroll | IUPUI Gymnasium (398); Indianapolis, IN |
| November 26, 2022*; 1:00 p.m., ESPN3 | | at Indiana State | W 74–62 | 1–4 | 19 – Kroll | 9 – Felder | 9 – Felder | Hulman Center (1,158); Terre Haute, IN |
| November 29, 2022*; 7:00 p.m., ESPN+ | | at Dayton | W 52–51 | 2–4 | 20 – Felder | 10 – Felder | 3 – Kroll | UD Arena (1,649); Dayton, OH |
| December 2, 2022*; 6:00 p.m., ESPN+ | | at George Washington | L 57–74 | 2–5 | 20 – Felder | 5 – Kroll | 5 – McClure | Charles E. Smith Center (314); Washington, D.C. |
| December 13, 2022*; 7:00 p.m., ESPN+ | | Cincinnati | L 44–77 | 2–6 | 18 – Felder | 6 – Pope | 4 – 2 tied | Convocation Center (350); Athens, OH |
| December 18, 2022*; 1:00 p.m., ESPN+ | | Chattanooga | L 55–67 | 2–7 | 29 – Felder | 5 – Garnett | 4 – Felder | Convocation Center (334); Athens, OH |
| December 21, 2022*; 11:00 p.m., SEC+ | | at Kentucky | L 86–95 | 2–8 | 20 – Felder | 6 – Pope | 5 – Kroll | Memorial Coliseum (3,126); Lexington, KY |
| December 28, 2022*; 4:00 p.m., ESPN+ | | at Columbia | L 59–81 | 2–9 | 21 – Felder | 8 – Kroll | 5 – Felder | Levien Gymnasium (572); New York, NY |
MAC regular season
| January 4, 2023; 7:00 p.m., ESPN+ | | at Akron | L 64–73 | 2–10 (0–1) | 22 – Felder | 6 – Hale | 6 – Felder | James A. Rhodes Arena (414); Akron, OH |
| January 7, 2023; 1:00 p.m., ESPN3 | | Kent State | L 44–60 | 2–11 (0–2) | 11 – McClure | 6 – Kroll | 1 – 5 tied | Convocation Center (478); Athens, OH |
| January 11, 2023; 7:00 p.m., ESPN+ | | Buffalo | L 64–69 | 2–12 (0–3) | 22 – Felder | 9 – Kroll | 4 – McClure | Convocation Center (391); Athens, OH |
| January 14, 2023; 2:00 p.m., ESPN3 | | at Northern Illinois | L 66–78 | 2–13 (0–4) | 23 – Felder | 4 – 3 tied | 9 – Felder | Convocation Center (583); DeKalb, IL |
| January 18, 2023; 7:00 p.m., ESPN+ | | Western Michigan | L 57–68 | 2–14 (0–5) | 17 – Felder | 7 – Hale | 5 – Felder | Convocation Center (567); Athens, OH |
| January 21, 2023; 1:00 p.m., ESPN3 | | at Miami (OH) | W 84–73 ^{OT} | 3–14 (1–5) | 28 – Felder | 10 – Kroll | 6 – Felder | Millett Hall (366); Oxford, OH |
| January 25, 2023; 7:00 p.m., ESPN+ | | at Central Michigan | L 66–69 | 3–15 (1–6) | 40 – Felder | 9 – Kroll | 3 – Felder | McGuirk Arena (1,082); Mount Pleasant, MI |
| January 28, 2023; 1:00 p.m., ESPN3 | | Ball State | L 58–78 | 3–16 (1–7) | 19 – Felder | 9 – Kroll | 6 – Felder | Convocation Center (843); Athens, OH |
| February 1, 2023; 7:00 p.m., ESPN+ | | at Eastern Michigan | W 65–55 | 4–16 (2–7) | 24 – Felder | 6 – Garnett | 4 – Felder | George Gervin GameAbove Center (1,866); Ypsilanti, MI |
| February 4, 2023; 2:00 p.m., ESPN3 | | at Toledo | L 55–66 | 4–17 (2–8) | 33 – Felder | 6 – Kroll | 5 – Kroll | Savage Arena (4,527); Toledo, OH |
| February 8, 2023; 7:00 p.m., ESPN+ | | Bowling Green | L 44–81 | 4–18 (2–9) | 14 – McClure | 8 – Felder | 3 – Felder | Convocation Center (841); Athens, OH |
| February 11, 2023; 1:00 p.m., ESPN3 | | Northern Illinois | W 72–71 | 5–18 (3–9) | 23 – Felder | 10 – Kroll | 5 – McClure | Convocation Center (609); Athens, OH |
| February 15, 2023; 6:30 p.m., ESPN+ | | at Ball State | L 53–78 | 5–19 (3–10) | 19 – Felder | 8 – Felder | 4 – McClure | Worthen Arena (934); Muncie, IN |
| February 18, 2023; 1:00 p.m., ESPN3 | | Central Michigan | W 83–75 | 6–19 (4–10) | 32 – Felder | 11 – Felder | 7 – McClure | Convocation Center; Athens, OH |
| February 22, 2023; 7:00 p.m., ESPN+ | | at Kent State | L 56–82 | 6–20 (4–11) | 24 – Felder | 6 – Felder | 3 – McClure | MAC Center (2,382); Kent, OH |
| February 25, 2023; 1:00 p.m., ESPN3 | | at Western Michigan | L 49–68 | 6–21 (4–12) | 23 – Felder | 7 – Felder | 5 – McClure | University Arena (1,005); Kalamazoo, MI |
| March 1, 2023; 7:00 p.m., ESPN+ | | Miami | L 75–81 | 6–22 (4–13) | 32 – Felder | 4 – 2 tied | 5 – 2 tied | Convocation Center (790); Athens, OH |
| March 4, 2023; 1:00 p.m., ESPN3 | | Eastern Michigan | L 64–74 | 6–23 (4–14) | 35 – Felder | 6 – J. Hale | 4 – 2 tied | Convocation Center (901); Athens, OH |
*Non-conference game. ^{#}Rankings from AP poll. (#) Tournament seedings in parentheses. All times are in Eastern.

== Awards and honors ==
=== All-MAC awards ===
Postseason All-MAC teams
| Team | Player | Position | Year |
|---|---|---|---|
| All-MAC 2nd team | Yaya Felder | G | So. |
| All-MAC freshman team | Jaya McClure | G | Fr. |
