= 2023–24 Toledo Rockets women's basketball team =

American college basketball season

2023–24 Toledo Rockets women's basketball

MAC regular-season champions

WBIT, quarterfinals
- Conference: Mid-American Conference
- Record: 28–6 (17–1 MAC)
- Head coach: Tricia Cullop (16th season)
- Associate head coach: Jessie Ivey
- Assistant coaches: Danielle Page; Ari Wideman
- Home arena: Savage Arena

2023–24 Mid-American Conference women's basketball standings
| | Conf. | | | | Overall |
| Team | W | | L | PCT | W | | L | PCT |
|---|---|---|---|---|---|---|---|---|
| Toledo | 17 | – | 1 | .944 | 28 | – | 6 | .824 |
| Ball State | 16 | – | 2 | .889 | 28 | – | 6 | .824 |
| Kent State † | 13 | – | 5 | .722 | 21 | – | 12 | .636 |
| Buffalo | 10 | – | 8 | .556 | 19 | – | 14 | .576 |
| Bowling Green | 10 | – | 8 | .556 | 16 | – | 15 | .516 |
| Northern Illinois | 8 | – | 10 | .444 | 15 | – | 16 | .484 |
| Ohio | 8 | – | 10 | .444 | 11 | – | 19 | .367 |
| Western Michigan | 7 | – | 11 | .389 | 12 | – | 18 | .400 |
| Miami (OH) | 6 | – | 12 | .333 | 9 | – | 20 | .310 |
| Akron | 6 | – | 12 | .333 | 11 | – | 18 | .379 |
| Central Michigan | 4 | – | 14 | .222 | 6 | – | 22 | .214 |
| Eastern Michigan | 3 | – | 15 | .167 | 7 | – | 22 | .241 |
† 2024 MAC tournament winner

The 2023–24 Toledo Rockets women's basketball team represented the University of Toledo during the 2023–24 NCAA Division I women's basketball season. The Rockets, led by 16th-year head coach Tricia Cullop, played their home games at Savage Arena in Toledo, Ohio as members of the Mid-American Conference (MAC).

At the end of the season, Cullop moved on to coach for the Miami Hurricanes women's basketball team.

== Previous season ==
The Rockets finished MAC play in the 2022–23 season with a 16–2 record to claim the regular-season championship for the second straight season. As the top seed they defeated Buffalo, Kent State and Bowling Green to win the MAC tournament. They were placed as the twelfth seed in the Seattle Region 3 of the 2023 NCAA tournament where they defeated Iowa State in the first round. They lost to Tennessee in the second round.

== Roster ==
2023–24 Toledo Rockets women's basketball team
Players
Coaches

| Pos. | # | Name | Height | Year | Previous school | Hometown |
|---|---|---|---|---|---|---|
| G/F | 1 | Nan Garcia | 6 ft 0 in (1.83 m) | Sr | Penn State | Jeffersonville, IN |
| G | 2 | Sophia Wiard | 5 ft 7 in (1.7 m) | Sr | Oak Ridge High School | Muskegon, MI |
| G | 3 | Ella Doherty | 5 ft 11 in (1.8 m) | Jr | Caledonia Pride | Powmill, scotland |
| G | 4 | Soleil Barnes | 5 ft 6 in (1.68 m) | Sr | Southfield High School | Southfield, MI |
| G | 5 | Quinesha Lockett | 5 ft 10 in (1.78 m) | Sr | Benson High School | Omaha, NE |
| G | 11 | Bella Swedlund | 5 ft 8 in (1.73 m) | Fr | Kansas | Winner, SD |
| G | 12 | Ella Weaver | 6 ft 0 in (1.83 m) | Fr | William Monroe High School | Ruckersville, VA |
| G | 14 | Cadence Dykstra | 5 ft 8 in (1.73 m) | Fr | West Catholic High School | Grand Rapids, MI |
| G | 22 | Khera Goss | 5 ft 9 in (1.75 m) | Sr | Ben Davis High School | Indianapolis, IN |
| F | 23 | Macey Fegan | 5 ft 11 in (1.8 m) | Fr | Standish-Sterling High School | Bentley, MI |
| G/F | 24 | Yaniah Curry | 5 ft 8 in (1.73 m) | Sr | Francis Howell Central High School | Cottleville, MO |
| G | 30 | Emmi Rinat | 6 ft 0 in (1.83 m) | Jr | Rhode Island | Zafririm, Israel |
| G/F | 33 | Sammi Mikonowicz | 5 ft 10 in (1.78 m) | Sr | Rossford High School | Rossford, OH |
| F | 34 | Jessica Cook | 6 ft 2 in (1.88 m) | Jr | Cicero–North Syracuse High School | Clay, NY |
| C | 51 | Hannah Noveroske | 6 ft 5 in (1.96 m) | Sr | Indiana | Michigan City, IN |

Head coach

- Tricia Cullop (Purdue)

Assistant coach(es)

- Jessie Ivey (West Florida)
- Danielle Page (Nebraska)
- Ari Wideman (Nevada)

Legend

- (C) Team captain
- (S) Suspended
- (I) Ineligible
- (W) Walk-on
- Injured
- Current redshirt

Roster
Last update: February 19, 2024

== Schedule and results ==
| Date time, TV | Rank^{#} | Opponent^{#} | Result | Record | Site (attendance) city, state |
Exhibition
| October 29, 2023*; 2:00 p.m. | | Ohio Dominican | W 88–29 | – | Savage Arena (–); Toledo, OH |
Non-conference regular season
| November 8, 2023*; 7:00 p.m., ESPN+ | | at James Madison; MAC–SBC Challenge | W 60–49 | 1–0 | Atlantic Union Bank Center (2,381); Harrisonburg, VA |
| November 12, 2023*; 5:00 p.m., ESPN+ | | at Gonzaga | L 70–91 | 1–1 | McCarthey Athletic Center (4,843); Spokane, WA |
| November 19, 2023*; 2:00 p.m., ESPN+ | | Cincinnati | L 60–71 | 1–2 | Savage Arena (4,073); Toledo, OH |
| November 24, 2023*; 3:00 p.m., FloHoops | | vs. SMU; San Diego Classic | W 74–73 | 2–2 | Harry West Gymnasium (–); San Diego, CA |
| November 25, 2023*; 3:00 p.m., FloHoops | | vs. North Dakota State; San Diego Classic | W 73–58 | 3–2 | Harry West Gymnasium (207); San Diego, CA |
| December 6, 2023*; 5:00 p.m., CBSSN | | Michigan | W 69–46 | 4–2 | Savage Arena (7,082); Toledo, OH |
| December 10, 2023*; 2:00 p.m., ESPN+ | | Loyola (MD) | W 65–35 | 5–2 | Savage Arena (3,860); Toledo, OH |
| December 17, 2023*; 7:00 p.m., ESPN+ | | at Oakland | W 78–65 | 6–2 | OU Credit Union O'rena (628); Rochester, MI |
| December 20, 2023*; 7:00 p.m., ACCNX | | at Duke | L 45–70 | 6–3 | Cameron Indoor Stadium (1,482); Durham, NC |
| December 30, 2023*; 2:00 p.m., ESPN+ | | Hillsdale | W 94–52 | 7–3 | Savage Arena (3,905); Toledo, OH |
MAC regular season
| January 3, 2024; 7:00 p.m., ESPN+ | | at Miami (OH) | W 70–52 | 8–3 (1–0) | Millett Hall (247); Oxford, OH |
| January 6, 2024; 1:00 p.m., ESPN+ | | at Eastern Michigan | W 48–35 | 9–3 (2–0) | George Gervin GameAbove Center (1,622); Ypsilanti, MI |
| January 10, 2024; 7:00 p.m., ESPN+ | | Western Michigan | W 82–55 | 10–3 (3–0) | Savage Arena (3,694); Toledo, OH |
| January 13, 2024; 2:00 p.m., ESPN+ | | Ohio | W 63–50 | 11–3 (4–0) | Savage Arena (4,116); Toledo, OH |
| January 17, 2024; 7:00 p.m., ESPN+ | | at Kent State | W 87–76 | 12–3 (5–0) | MAC Center (1,321); Kent, OH |
| January 21, 2024; 6:00 p.m., CBSSN | | at Ball State | L 51–65 | 12–4 (5–1) | Worthen Arena (2,469); Muncie, IN |
| January 24, 2024; 7:00 p.m., ESPN+ | | Northern Illinois | W 72–52 | 13–4 (6–1) | Savage Arena (3,902); Toledo, OH |
| January 27, 2024; 7:00 p.m., ESPN+ | | Buffalo | W 67–63 | 14–4 (7–1) | Savage Arena (4,157); Toledo, OH |
| January 31, 2024; 7:00 p.m., ESPN+ | | at Akron | W 88–66 | 15–4 (8–1) | James A. Rhodes Arena (1,004); Akron, OH |
| February 3, 2024; 2:00 p.m., ESPN+ | | Bowling Green | W 82–70 | 16–4 (9–1) | Savage Arena (6,077); Toledo, OH |
| February 7, 2024; 7:00 p.m., ESPN+ | | at Central Michigan | W 93–68 | 17–4 (10–1) | McGuirk Arena (1,433); Mount Pleasant, MI |
| February 10, 2024*; 12:00 p.m., ESPN+ | | Louisiana–Monroe; MAC–SBC Challenge | W 72–57 | 18–4 | Savage Arena (4,027); Toledo, OH |
| February 17, 2024; 6:00 p.m., ESPN+ | | at Bowling Green | W 88–68 | 19–4 (11–1) | Stroh Center (3,998); Bowling Green, OH |
| February 21, 2024; 7:00 p.m., ESPN+ | | Miami (OH) | W 68–36 | 20–4 (12–1) | Savage Arena (3,651); Toledo, OH |
| February 24, 2024; 2:00 p.m., ESPN+ | | Ball State | W 70–48 | 21–4 (13–1) | Savage Arena (5,556); Toledo, OH |
| February 28, 2024; 7:00 p.m., ESPN+ | | at Northern Illinois | W 74–61 | 22–4 (14–1) | Convocation Center (770); DeKalb, IL |
| March 2, 2024; 1:00 p.m., ESPN+ | | at Western Michigan | W 84–69 | 23–4 (15–1) | University Arena (1,004); Kalamazoo, MI |
| March 6, 2024; 7:00 p.m., ESPN+ | | Eastern Michigan | W 87–41 | 24–4 (16–1) | Savage Arena (4,877); Toledo, OH |
| March 9, 2024; 2:00 p.m., ESPN+ | | Kent State | W 83–61 | 25–4 (17–1) | Savage Arena (6,238); Toledo, OH |
MAC tournament
| March 13, 2024; 11:00 a.m., ESPN+ | (1) | vs. (8) Western Michigan; Quarterfinals | W 72–61 | 26–4 | Rocket Mortgage FieldHouse; Cleveland, OH |
| March 15, 2024; 10:00 a.m., ESPN+ | (1) | vs. (4) Buffalo; Semifinals | L 74–77 ^{OT} | 26–5 | Rocket Mortgage FieldHouse; Cleveland, OH |
WBIT
| March 21, 2024*; 7:00 p.m., ESPN+ | (2) | Cleveland State; First round | W 76–68 | 27–5 | Savage Arena (1,877); Toledo, OH |
| March 24, 2024*; 2:00 p.m., ESPN+ | (2) | St. John's; Second round | W 72–71 | 28–5 | Savage Arena (2,521); Toledo, OH |
| March 28, 2024*; 9:00 p.m., ESPN+ | (2) | at (1) Washington State; Quarterfinals | L 61–63 | 28–6 | Beasley Coliseum (901); Pullman, WA |
*Non-conference game. ^{#}Rankings from AP poll. (#) Tournament seedings in parentheses. All times are in Eastern.

== See also ==
- 2023–24 Toledo Rockets men's basketball team
