= 2022–23 Mid-American Conference women's basketball season =

- League: NCAA Division I
- Sport: Basketball
- Teams: 12

Regular season
- League champions: Toledo
- Runners-up: Bowling Green
- Season MVP: Quinesha Lockett

2023 MAC tournament
- champions: Toledo
- 2023 MAC tournament MVP: Quinesha Lockett

Tournament

Mid-American women's basketball seasons
- 2021–22 2023–24

2022–23 Mid-American Conference women's basketball standings
	Conf.				Overall
Team	W		L	PCT	W		L	PCT
Toledo†	16	–	2	.889	29	–	5	.853
Bowling Green	14	–	4	.778	30	–	6	.833
Ball State	14	–	4	.778	26	–	8	.765
Kent State	12	–	6	.667	21	–	11	.656
Akron	8	–	10	.444	17	–	13	.567
Northern Illinois	8	–	10	.444	16	–	17	.485
Eastern Michigan	7	–	11	.389	15	–	15	.500
Buffalo	7	–	11	.389	12	–	16	.429
Western Michigan	7	–	11	.389	12	–	17	.414
Miami (OH)	7	–	11	.389	12	–	19	.387
Central Michigan	4	–	14	.222	6	–	23	.207
Ohio	4	–	14	.222	6	–	23	.207
† 2023 MAC tournament winner As of March 24, 2023

The 2022–23 Mid-American Conference women's basketball season began with practices in October 2022, followed by the start of the 2022–23 NCAA Division I women's basketball season in November. Conference play began in January 2023 and concluded in March 2023. The 2023 MAC tournament was held at Rocket Mortgage FieldHouse in Cleveland, Ohio for the 23rd consecutive season.

Toledo won the regular season championship with a 16–2 record and defeated second seeded Bowling Green in the MAC tournament final to earn the conference's automatic bid into the 2023 NCAA tournament. Quinesha Lockett of Toledo was the MVP of both the regular season and the tournament.

== Head coaches ==
=== Coaching changes ===
==== Buffalo ====
On March 26, 2022, Felisha Legette-Jack, who had been the head coach at Buffalo since 2012, was hired as the head coach of her alma mater Syracuse. In 10 years Legette-Jack compiled a 201–114 at Buffalo with three MAC tournament titles, four NCAA tournament appearances, and three NCAA tournament wins. On April 6 Buffalo announced USC Upstate head coach Becky Burke as their new head coach.

=== Coaches ===
Team	Head coach	Previous job	Years at school	Overall record	School record	MAC record	MAC titles	MAC Tournament titles	NCAA tournaments	NCAA Final Fours	NCAA Championships
Akron	Melissa Jackson	Akron (assoc. HC)	5	55–56 (.495)	55–56 (.495)	32–40 (.444)	0	0	0	0	0
Ball State	Brady Sallee	Eastern Illinois	11	318–242 (.568)	183–142 (.563)	113–68 (.624)	0	0	0	0	0
Bowling Green	Robyn Fralick	Ashland	5	161–90 (.641)	57–66 (.463)	29–45 (.392)	1	0	0	0	0
Buffalo	Becky Burke	USC Upstate	1	113–55 (.673)	0–0 (–)	0–0 (–)	0	0	0	0	0
Central Michigan	Heather Oesterle	Central Michigan (assoc. HC)	4	44–39 (.530)	44–39 (.530)	30–25 (.545)	1	1	1	0	0
Eastern Michigan	Fred Castro	Washington (asst.)	7	64–107 (.374)	64–107 (.374)	33–73 (.311)	0	0	0	0	0
Kent State	Todd Starkey	Indiana (asst.)	7	255–172 (.597)	101–77 (.567)	60–48 (.556)	0	0	0	0	0
Miami	DeUnna Hendrix	High Point	4	148–154 (.490)	23–61 (.274)	11–47 (.190)	0	0	0	0	0
Northern Illinois	Lisa Carlsen	Lewis	8	287–269 (.516)	103–105 (.495)	62–67 (.481)	0	0	0	0	0
Ohio	Bob Boldon	Youngstown State	10	277–187 (.597)	179–99 (.644)	102–60 (.630)	2	1	1	0	0
Toledo	Tricia Cullop	Evansville	15	419–268 (.610)	296–158 (.652)	161–85 (.654)	2	1	1	0	0
Western Michigan	Shane Clipfell	Michigan State (assoc. HC)	11	220–203 (.520)	148–156 (.487)	80–102 (.440)	0	0	0	0	0

Notes:

- Appearances, titles, etc. are from time with current school only.
- Years at school includes 2022–23 season.
- MAC records are from time at current school only.
- All statistics and records are through the beginning of the season.

== Preseason ==
The preseason coaches' poll and league awards were announced by the league office on October 27, 2022. Defending 2021–22 regular season champion Toledo was named the favorite.

=== Preseason women's basketball coaches poll ===
Women's basketball preseason Poll
Place	Team	Points	First place votes
1.	Toledo	143	11
2.	Ball State	130	1
3.	Bowling Green	109	--
4.	Kent State	103	--
5.	Northern Illinois	99	--
6.	Western Michigan	91	--
7.	Ohio	61	--
8.	Akron	50	--
9.	Eastern Michigan	46	--
10.	Buffalo	40	--
11.	Miami	35	--
12.	Central Michigan	29	--

MAC Tournament champions: Toledo (9), Ball State (3)

=== MAC Preseason All-Conference ===
Honor	Recipient
Preseason All-MAC First Team	Quinesha Lockett, G, Toledo Sr.
Preseason All-MAC First Team	A'Jah Davis, F, Northern Illinois Sr.
Preseason All-MAC First Team	Ally Becki, G, Ball State, So.
Preseason All-MAC First Team	Peyton Scott, G, Miami Sr.
Preseason All-MAC First Team	Sophia Wiard, G, Toledo Sr.
Preseason All-MAC Second Team	Lauren Ross, G, Western Michigan, R-So.
Preseason All-MAC Second Team	Chelby Koker, G, Northern Illinois Sr.
Preseason All-MAC Second Team	Lexi Fleming, G, Bowling Green Jr.
Preseason All-MAC Second Team	Raegan Bass, F, Akron, So.
Preseason All-MAC Second Team	Kadie Hempfling, F, Bowling Green Sr.

== Regular season ==
The schedule was released in late August.

=== Record against ranked non-conference opponents ===
This is a list of games against ranked opponents only (rankings from the AP Poll):

Date	Visitor	Home	Site	Significance	Score	Conference record
Nov 7	Northern Illinois	No. 9 Notre Dame	Purcell Pavilion ● Notre Dame, IN	—	L 48–88	0–1
Nov 16	Western Michigan	No. 23 Michigan	Crisler Center ● Ann Arbor, MI	―	L 67–99	0–2
Nov 17	No. 8 Ohio State	Ohio	Convocation Center ● Athens, OH	―	L 56–86	0–3
Nov 17	Bowling Green	No. 12 Indiana	Simon Skjodt Assembly Hall ● Bloomington, IN	―	L 61–96	0–4
Nov 20	Ball State	No. 9 Notre Dame	Purcell Pavilion ● Notre Dame, IN	―	L 60–95	0–5
Dec 8	Toledo	No. 14 Michigan	Crisler Center ● Ann Arbor, MI	―	W 71–68	1–5
Dec 21	Western Michigan	No. 5 Notre Dame	Purcell Pavilion ● Notre Dame, IN	―	L 57–85	1–6

Team rankings are reflective of AP poll when the game was played, not current or final ranking

† denotes game was played on neutral site

== Rankings ==
		Pre	Wk 2	Wk 3	Wk 4	Wk 5	Wk 6	Wk 7	Wk 8	Wk 9	Wk 10	Wk 11	Wk 12	Wk 13	Wk 14	Wk 15	Wk 16	Wk 17	Wk 18	Wk 19	Final
Akron	AP																				
Akron	C																				
Ball State	AP																				
Ball State	C																				
Bowling Green	AP																				
Bowling Green	C																				
Buffalo	AP																				
Buffalo	C																				
Central Michigan	AP																				
Central Michigan	C																				
Eastern Michigan	AP																				
Eastern Michigan	C																				
Kent State	AP																				
Kent State	C																				
Miami	AP																				
Miami	C																				
Northern Illinois	AP																				
Northern Illinois	C																				
Ohio	AP																				
Ohio	C																				
Toledo	AP																RV	RV	RV	RV	RV
Toledo	C																				
Western Michigan	AP																				
Western Michigan	C																				

Legend
	Improvement in ranking
	Drop in ranking
	Not ranked previous week
	No change in ranking from previous week
RV	Received votes but were not ranked in Top 25 of poll
т	Tied with team above or below also with this symbol

== All-MAC Awards ==
=== Mid-American women's basketball weekly awards ===
Week	Player(s) of the Week	School
Nov 14	Maddi Cluse	Miami
Nov 21	Lauren Ross	Western Michigan
Nov 28	A’Jah Davis	Northern Illinois
Dec 5	Chelby Koker	Northern Illinois
Dec 12	Lauren Ross	Western Michigan
Dec 19	Lauren Ross	Western Michigan
Dec 26	Zakiyah Winfield	Buffalo
Jan 2	Reagan Bass	Akron
Jan 9	Rochelle Norris	Central Michigan
Jan 16	Quinesha Lockett	Toledo
Jan 23	Lauren Ross	Western Michigan
Jan 30	Quinesha Lockett	Toledo
Feb 6	Taylor Williams	Western Michigan
Feb 13	Anna Clephane	Ball State
Feb 20	Re’Shawna Stone	Buffalo
Feb 27	A’Jah Davis	Northern Illinois
Mar 6	Re’Shawna Stone	Buffalo

== Postseason ==
=== Mid–American Tournament ===
Toledo defeated Bowling Green in the final to earn the conference's automatic bid into the 2023 NCAA tournament. Quinesha Lockett of Toledo was the MVP.

=== NCAA tournament ===
Toledo was placed as the twelfth seed in the Seattle Region 3 of the 2023 NCAA tournament where they defeated Iowa State in the first round. They lost to Tennessee in the second round.

=== Women's National Invitation Tournament ===
Bowling Green, Ball State, and Kent State accepted bids to the WNIT. Kent State was knocked out in the first round. Ball State lost in the second round. Bowling Green won four games before losing in the semi-finals.

=== Women's Basketball Invitational Tournament ===
Northern Illinois accepted a to the WBI, where they lost to Georgia Southern in the first round.

=== Postseason awards ===
- Coach of the Year: Tricia Cullop, Toledo
- Player of the Year: Quinesha Lockett, senior, guard, Toledo
- Freshman of the Year: Sydney Harris, guard/forward, Central Michigan
- Defensive Player of the Year: Nyla Hampton, junior, guard, Bowling Green
- Sixth Player of the Year: Janae Poisson, graduate student, guard, Northern Illinois

=== Honors ===
Honor	Recipient
Postseason All-MAC First Team	Quinesha Lockett, senior, guard, Toledo
Postseason All-MAC First Team	A’Jah Davis, senior, forward, Northern Illinois
Postseason All-MAC First Team	Anna Clephane, senior, guard/forward, Ball State
Postseason All-MAC First Team	Elissa Brett, senior, guard, Bowling Green
Postseason All-MAC First Team	Reagan Bass, sophomore, forward, Akron
Postseason All-MAC Second Team	Yaya Felder, sophomore, guard, Ohio
Postseason All-MAC Second Team	Re’Shawna Stone, graduate student, Guard, Buffalo
Postseason All-MAC Second Team	Ally Becki, sophomore, guard, Ball State
Postseason All-MAC Second Team	Chelby Koker, senior, guard, Northern Illinois
Postseason All-MAC Second Team	Allison Day, senior, forward, Bowling Green
Postseason All-MAC Third Team	Katie Shumate, senior, guard, Kent State
Postseason All-MAC Third Team	Peyton Scott, senior, guard, Miami
Postseason All-MAC Third Team	Ivy Wolf, sophomore, guard, Miami
Postseason All-MAC Third Team	Sophia Wiard, senior, guard, Toledo
Postseason All-MAC Third Team	Sydney Harris, freshman, guard/forward, Central Michigan
Postseason All-MAC Honorable Mention	Ce’Nara Skanes, redshirt junior, forward, Eastern Michigan
Postseason All-MAC Honorable Mention	Thelma Dis Augustsdottir, graduate student, guard/forward, Ball State
Postseason All-MAC Honorable Mention	Taylor Williams, redshirt junior, forward, Western Michigan
Postseason All-MAC Honorable Mention	Lauren Ross, redshirt sophomore, guard, Western Michigan
Postseason All-MAC Honorable Mention	Lindsey Thall, graduate student, forward, Kent State
All-MAC Freshman Team	Sydney Harris, guard/forward, Central Michigan
All-MAC Freshman Team	Corynne Hauser, guard, Kent State
All-MAC Freshman Team	Bridget Utberg, guard, Central Michigan
All-MAC Freshman Team	Olivia Smith, guard, Eastern Michigan
All-MAC Freshman Team	Jaya McClure, guard, Ohio
All-MAC Defensive Team	Nyla Hampton, junior, guard, Bowling Green
All-MAC Defensive Team	Dominique Camp, senior, guard, Akron
All-MAC Defensive Team	Khera Goss, junior, guard, Toledo
All-MAC Defensive Team	Taylor Williams, redshirt junior, forward, Western Michigan
All-MAC Defensive Team	Elissa Brett, senior, guard, Bowling Green

== See also ==
- 2022–23 Mid-American Conference men's basketball season
