= 2023 MAC women's basketball tournament =

- Classification: Division I
- Season: 2022–23
- Teams: 8
- Site: Rocket Mortgage FieldHouse; Cleveland, Ohio
- Champions: Toledo (9th title)
- Winning coach: Tricia Cullop (2nd title)
- MVP: Quinesha Lockett (Toledo)
- Television: CBSSN, ESPN+
- MAC women's basketball tournaments

2022–23 Mid-American Conference women's basketball standings
	Conf.				Overall
Team	W		L	PCT	W		L	PCT
Toledo†	16	–	2	.889	29	–	5	.853
Bowling Green	14	–	4	.778	30	–	6	.833
Ball State	14	–	4	.778	26	–	8	.765
Kent State	12	–	6	.667	21	–	11	.656
Akron	8	–	10	.444	17	–	13	.567
Northern Illinois	8	–	10	.444	16	–	17	.485
Eastern Michigan	7	–	11	.389	15	–	15	.500
Buffalo	7	–	11	.389	12	–	16	.429
Western Michigan	7	–	11	.389	12	–	17	.414
Miami (OH)	7	–	11	.389	12	–	19	.387
Central Michigan	4	–	14	.222	6	–	23	.207
Ohio	4	–	14	.222	6	–	23	.207
† 2023 MAC tournament winner As of March 24, 2023

The 2023 MAC women's basketball tournament was the postseason basketball tournament that ends the 2022–23 college basketball season in the Mid-American Conference (MAC). The entire tournament was held at Rocket Mortgage FieldHouse, in Cleveland, Ohio between March 8 and 11. Toledo defeated Bowling Green in the final to earn the conference's automatic bid into the 2023 NCAA tournament. Quinesha Lockett of Toledo was the MVP.

== Format ==
As with the 2021, and 2022 tournament, only the top eight teams qualify. The winner of the tournament received the MAC's automatic bid to the 2023 NCAA tournament.

== Venue ==
The 2022 MAC tournament was held at Rocket Mortgage FieldHouse for the 23rd consecutive season. The venue was the home of the Cleveland Cavaliers of the NBA, has a capacity for basketball of 19,432, and is located in downtown Cleveland at One Center Court.

== Seeds ==
Eight out of the 12 MAC teams qualified for the tournament. Teams were seeded by record within the conference, with a tiebreaker system to seed teams with identical conference records.

Seed	School	Conference record	Tiebreaker
1	Toledo	16–2	
2	Bowling Green	14–4	1–1 vs. Toledo
3	Ball State	14–4	0–2 vs. Toledo
4	Kent State	12–6	
5	Northern Illinois	8–10	1–0 vs. Akron
6	Akron	8–10	0–1 vs. Northern Illinois
7	Eastern Michigan	7–11	4–1 vs. 7–11 teams
8	Buffalo	7–11	3–3 vs. 7–11 teams; 1–2 vs. Ball State/Bowling Green
DNQ	Miami	7–11	2–2 vs. 7–11 teams; 0–3 vs. Ball State/Bowling Green
DNQ	Western Michigan	7–11	1–4 vs. 7–11 teams
DNQ	Ohio	4–14	1–2 vs. Akron/Northern Illinois
DNQ	Central Michigan	4–14	1–3 vs. Akron/Northern Illinois

== Schedule ==
Session	Game	Time*	Matchup	Score	Attendance	Television
Quarterfinals – Wednesday, March 8 – Rocket Mortgage FieldHouse, Cleveland, OH
1	1	11:00 am	No. 1 Toledo vs No. 8 Buffalo	75–74^{OT}		ESPN+
1	2	1:30 p.m.	No. 4 Kent State vs No. 5 Northern Illinois	75–68		ESPN+
1	3	4:00 p.m.	No. 2 Bowling Green vs No. 7 Eastern Michigan	70–36		ESPN+
1	4	6:30 p.m.	No. 3 Ball State vs No. 6 Akron	92–68		ESPN+
Semifinals – Friday, March 10 – Rocket Mortgage FieldHouse, Cleveland, OH
2	5	10:00 am	No. 1 Toledo vs No. 4 Kent State	68–58		ESPN+
2	6	12:30 p.m.	No. 2 Bowling Green vs. No. 3 Ball State	70–61		ESPN+
Championship – Saturday, March 11 – Rocket Mortgage FieldHouse, Cleveland, OH
3	7	11:00 am	No. 1 Toledo vs No. 2 Bowling Green	73-58	2,810	CBSSN
*Game times in ET. ()-Rankings denote tournament seeding.

== Bracket ==
Quarterfinals; Wednesday, March 8, 2023
1	Toledo	75*
8	Buffalo	74
4	Kent State	75
5	Northern Illinois	68
2	Bowling Green	70
7	Eastern Michigan	36
3	Ball State	92
6	Akron	68

Semifinals; Friday, March 10, 2023
1	Toledo	68
4	Kent State	58
2	Bowling Green	70
3	Ball State	61

Championship; Saturday, March 11, 2023
1	Toledo	73
2	Bowling Green	58

- - indicates overtime

== All-Tournament team ==
Tournament MVP – Quinesha Lockett

Player	Team
Quinesha Lockett	Toledo
Sammi Mikonowicz	Toledo
Jessica Cook	Toledo
Elissa Brett	Bowling Green
Katie Shumate	Kent State

== See also ==
2023 MAC men's basketball tournament
