= UT basketball =

UT basketball may refer to:

- Texas Longhorns basketball (disambiguation)
- Tennessee Volunteers basketball
- Toledo Rockets basketball (disambiguation)
- Tulsa Golden Hurricane basketball
