= 2021–22 Mid-American Conference women's basketball season =

- League: NCAA Division I
- Sport: Basketball
- Teams: 12

Regular season
- Champions: Toledo
- Runners-up: Buffalo
- Season MVP: Jordyn Dawson

Tournament

Mid-American women's basketball seasons
- ← 2020–21 2022–23 →

2021–22 Mid-American Conference women's basketball standings
	Conf.				Overall
Team	W		L	PCT	W		L	PCT
Toledo	19	–	1	.950	29	–	6	.829
Buffalo †	16	–	4	.800	25	–	9	.735
Akron	13	–	7	.650	17	–	12	.586
Ball State	11	–	8	.579	20	–	13	.606
Northern Illinois	11	–	9	.550	14	–	15	.483
Kent State	10	–	10	.500	19	–	12	.613
Western Michigan	10	–	10	.500	16	–	14	.533
Bowling Green	10	–	10	.500	17	–	16	.515
Ohio	9	–	10	.474	15	–	15	.500
Miami (OH)	4	–	16	.200	8	–	21	.276
Eastern Michigan	4	–	16	.200	7	–	20	.259
Central Michigan	2	–	18	.100	4	–	25	.138
† 2022 MAC tournament winner

The 2021–22 Mid-American Conference women's basketball season began with practices in October 2021, followed by the start of the 2021–22 NCAA Division I women's basketball season in November. Conference play began in January 2022 and concluded in March 2022. Toledo won the MAC regular season championship with a conference record of 19–1.

Second seeded Buffalo won the MAC tournament with a 79–75 win over Ball State. With the automatic bid, Buffalo was the only MAC school to qualify for the NCAA tournament where they lost to Tennessee in the first round. Toledo, Akron, Ball State, Kent State, and Ohio all accepted bids to the WNIT. Bowling Green accepted a bid to the WBI.

== Preseason Awards ==
The preseason coaches' poll and league awards were announced by the league office on November 3, 2021.

=== Preseason women's basketball coaches poll ===
(First place votes in parentheses)

1. Ohio (4) 132
2. Bowling Green (3) 124
3. Buffalo (3) 123
4. Kent State 102
5. Eastern Michigan (1) 83
6. Central Michigan 80
7. Northern Illinois 79
8. Toledo 67
9. Ball State (1) 65
10. Western Michigan 31
11. Miami 27
12. Akron 23

MAC Tournament Champion: Buffalo (5), Ohio (3), BGSU (2), Ball State (1), EMU (1)

=== Honors ===
Honor	Recipient
Preseason All-MAC First Team	Dyaisha Fair, Buffalo
Preseason All-MAC First Team	Molly Davis, Central Michigan
Preseason All-MAC First Team	Areanna Combs, Eastern Michigan
Preseason All-MAC First Team	Cece Hooks, Ohio
Preseason All-MAC First Team	Erica Johnson, Ohio
Preseason All-MAC Second Team	Lexi Fleming, Bowling Green
Preseason All-MAC Second Team	Nila Blackford, Kent State
Preseason All-MAC Second Team	Peyton Scott, Miami
Preseason All-MAC Second Team	Chelby Koker, Northern Illinois
Preseason All-MAC Second Team	Quinesha Lockett, Toledo

== All-MAC Awards ==
=== Mid-American women's basketball weekly awards ===
Week	Player(s) of the Week	School	Newcomer of the Week	School
Nov 15	Jordyn Dawson	Akron		
Nov 22	Peyton Scott	Miami		
Nov 29	Dyaisha Fair	Buffalo		
Dec 6	Lauren Ross	Western Michigan		
Dec 13	Quinesha Lockett	Toledo		
Dec 20	A'Jah Davis	Northern Illinois		
Dec 27	Cece Hooks	Ohio		
Jan 3	Dyaisha Fair	Buffalo		
Jan 10	Dyaisha Fair	Buffalo		
Jan 17	Cece Hooks	Ohio		
Jan 24	Cece Hooks	Ohio		
Jan 31	Jordyn Dawson	Akron		
Feb 7	Ally Becki	Ball State		
Feb 14	Lauren Ross	Western Michigan		
Feb 21	Dyaisha Fair	Buffalo		
Feb 28	Jordyn Dawson	Akron		
Mar 7				

== Postseason ==
=== Postseason Awards ===
1. Coach of the Year: Tricia Cullop, Toledo
2. Player of the Year: Jordyn Dawson, Akron
3. Freshman of the Year: Georgia Woolley, Buffalo
4. Defensive Player of the Year: Jordyn Dawson, Akron \ Cece Hooks, Ohio
5. Sixth Player of the Year: Hannah Noveroske, Toledo

=== Honors ===
Honor	Recipient
Postseason All-MAC First Team	Jordyn Dawson, Akron
Postseason All-MAC First Team	Dyaisha Fair, Buffalo
Postseason All-MAC First Team	A'Jah Davis, Northern Illinois
Postseason All-MAC First Team	Cece Hooks, Ohio
Postseason All-MAC First Team	Quinesha Lockett, Toledo
Postseason All-MAC Second Team	Summer Hemphill, Buffalo
Postseason All-MAC Second Team	Molly Davis, Central Michigan
Postseason All-MAC Second Team	Areanna Combs, Eastern Michigan
Postseason All-MAC Second Team	Peyton Scott, Miami
Postseason All-MAC Second Team	Sophia Wiard, Toledo
Postseason All-MAC Third Team	Ally Becki, Ball State
Postseason All-MAC Third Team	Kadie Hempfling, Bowling Green
Postseason All-MAC Third Team	Georgia Woolley, Buffalo
Postseason All-MAC Third Team	Erica Johnson, Ohio
Postseason All-MAC Third Team	Lauren Ross, Western Michigan
Postseason All-MAC Honorable Mention	Reagan Bass, Akron
Postseason All-MAC Honorable Mention	Thelma Dis Agustsdottir, Ball State
Postseason All-MAC Honorable Mention	Chelby Koker, Northern Illinois
Postseason All-MAC Honorable Mention	Janae Poisson, Northern Illinois
Postseason All-MAC Honorable Mention	Gabby Burris, Ohio
All-MAC Freshman Team	Reagan Bass, Akron
All-MAC Freshman Team	Ally Becki, Ball State
All-MAC Freshman Team	Amy Velasco, Bowling Green
All-MAC Freshman Team	Georgia Woolley, Buffalo
All-MAC Freshman Team	Jessica Cook, Toledo
All-MAC Freshman Team	Lauren Ross, Western Michigan
All-MAC Defensive Team	Jordyn Dawson, Akron
All-MAC Defensive Team	Nyla Hampton, Bowling Green
All-MAC Defensive Team	Summer Hemphill, Buffalo
All-MAC Defensive Team	Cece Hooks, Ohio
All-MAC Defensive Team	Khera Goss, Toledo

== See also ==
2021–22 Mid-American Conference men's basketball season
