= 2021–22 Buffalo Bulls women's basketball team =

Intercollegiate basketball season

2021–22 Buffalo Bulls women's basketball

MAC tournament champions

NCAA tournament, first round
- Conference: Mid-American Conference
- Record: 25-9 (16-4 MAC)
- Head coach: Felisha Legette-Jack (10th season)
- Assistant coaches: Kristen Sharkey; Khyreed Carter; Blair Estarfaa
- Home arena: Alumni Arena

2021–22 Mid-American Conference women's basketball standings
	Conf.				Overall
Team	W		L	PCT	W		L	PCT
Toledo	19	–	1	.950	29	–	6	.829
Buffalo †	16	–	4	.800	25	–	9	.735
Akron	13	–	7	.650	17	–	12	.586
Ball State	11	–	8	.579	20	–	13	.606
Northern Illinois	11	–	9	.550	14	–	15	.483
Kent State	10	–	10	.500	19	–	12	.613
Western Michigan	10	–	10	.500	16	–	14	.533
Bowling Green	10	–	10	.500	17	–	16	.515
Ohio	9	–	10	.474	15	–	15	.500
Miami (OH)	4	–	16	.200	8	–	21	.276
Eastern Michigan	4	–	16	.200	7	–	20	.259
Central Michigan	2	–	18	.100	4	–	25	.138
† 2022 MAC tournament winner

The 2021–22 Buffalo Bulls women's basketball team represented the University at Buffalo during the 2021–22 NCAA Division I women's basketball season. The Bulls, led by tenth-year head coach Felisha Legette-Jack, played their home games at Alumni Arena as members of the Mid-American Conference.

They finished the season 25–9, 16–4 in MAC play to finish in second place. As the second seed in the MAC tournament, they defeated Western Michigan, Akron, and Ball State to win the championship. They received an automatic bid to the NCAA tournament, where they were the thirteenth seed in the Wichita Region. They were defeated in the first round by fourth seed Tennessee to end their season.

== Previous season ==
The Bulls finished the 2020–21 season 15–9, 11–6 in MAC play to finish in a tie for third place. As the fourth seed in the MAC tournament, they defeated Kent State in the Quarterfinals before losing to Bowling Green in the semifinals. They were not invited to the NCAA tournament or the WNIT.

== Roster ==
2021–22 Buffalo Bulls women's basketball team
Players
Coaches

Pos.	#	Name	Height	Year	Previous school	Hometown
F	0	Summer Hemphill	6 ft 1 in (1.85 m)	GS	Cardinal O'Hara	Buffalo, NY
F	1	Loren Christie	6 ft 3 in (1.91 m)	Jr	Barking Abbey	Hertfordshire, England
G	2	Dyaisha Fair	5 ft 5 in (1.65 m)	Jr	Edison Tech	Rochester, NY
G	3	Jazmine Young	5 ft 8 in (1.73 m)	Sr	Dominican; Tennessee State	Milwaukee, WI
G	4	Georgia Woolley	6 ft 0 in (1.83 m)	Fr	St Paul's School	Brisbane, Australia
G	5	Nia Jordan	6 ft 1 in (1.85 m)	Jr	Neumann & Goretti; Labette CC	Philadelphia, PA
G	11	Dominique Camp	5 ft 8 in (1.73 m)	Jr	Lakota West; Troy	Dayton, OH
G	12	Cheyenne McEvans	5 ft 9 in (1.75 m)	So	Southfield A&T	Southfield, MI
G	15	Casey Valenti-Paea	5 ft 9 in (1.75 m)	So	Maribyrnong College	Melbourne, Australia
F	22	Laney Bone	5 ft 10 in (1.78 m)	Fr	Silverdale Baptist	Chattanooga, TN
F	23	Saniaa Wilson	6 ft 0 in (1.83 m)	Fr	Bishop Kearney	Rochester, NY
F	25	Adebola Adeyeye	6 ft 2 in (1.88 m)	Sr	The Rock School	Brampton, ON
F	30	Ramatoulaye Keita	5 ft 11 in (1.8 m)	RS So	Lake Forest Academy; Robert Morris	Bamako, Mali
F	35	Kaelonn Wilson	5 ft 11 in (1.8 m)	Fr	Piscataway	Piscataway, NJ
C	52	Elea Gaba	6 ft 3 in (1.91 m)	Jr	Sportgymnasium Chemnitz	Dresden, Germany

Head coach

- Felisha Legette-Jack (Syracuse)

Assistant coach(es)

- Kristen Sharkey (Buffalo)
- Khyreed Carter (Michigan State)
- Blair Estarfaa (SUNY Cortland)

Legend

- (C) Team captain
- (S) Suspended
- (I) Ineligible
- (W) Walk-on
- Injured
- Current redshirt

Roster
Last update: May 19, 2022

== Schedule ==
Date time, TV	Rank^{#}	Opponent^{#}	Result	Record	Site (attendance) city, state
Exhibition
November 4, 2021*; 5:00 p.m., ESPN3		Daemen	W 98–43	–	Alumni Arena (1,098); Buffalo, NY
Non-conference regular season
November 9, 2021*; 7:00 p.m., ESPN3		Canisius	W 102–42	1–0	Alumni Arena (1,189); Buffalo, NY
November 20, 2021*; 7:30 p.m., FloHoops		vs. No. 1 South Carolina; Battle 4 Atlantis	L 60–88	1–1	Imperial Arena (667); Paradise Island, Bahamas
November 21, 2021*; 7:30 p.m., FloHoops		vs. Oklahoma; Battle 4 Atlantis	L 72–93	1–2	Imperial Arena (591); Paradise Island, Bahamas
November 22, 2021*; 7:30 p.m., FloHoops		vs. Syracuse; Battle 4 Atlantis	W 88–79	2–2	Imperial Arena (329); Paradise Island, Bahamas
November 27, 2021*; 2:00 p.m., ESPN3		James Madison	W 62–45	3–2	Alumni Arena (1,164); Buffalo, NY
December 1, 2021*; 7:00 p.m., ESPN3		Niagara	W 95–55	4–2	Alumni Arena (1,265); Buffalo, NY
December 5, 2021*; 2:00 p.m., ESPN3		Rhode Island	W 69–55	5–2	Alumni Arena (1,280); Buffalo, NY
December 8, 2021*; 7:00 p.m., ESPN3		VCU	W 62–60	6–2	Alumni Arena (1,211); Buffalo, NY
December 14, 2021*; 7:00 p.m., ESPN+		at Princeton	L 77–79 ^{OT}	6–3	Jadwin Gymnasium (537); Princeton, NJ
December 20, 2021*; 5:00 p.m., ESPN+		at Bucknell	L 69–80	6–4	Sojka Pavilion (395); Lewisburg, PA
MAC regular season
December 29, 2021; 1:00 p.m., ESPN3		Central Michigan	W 92–75	7–4 (1–0)	Alumni Arena (1,198); Buffalo, NY
January 1, 2022; 1:00 p.m., ESPN3		at Miami (OH)	W 88–83	8–4 (2–0)	Millett Hall (325); Oxford, OH
January 5, 2022; 7:00 p.m., ESPN3		at Bowling Green	W 82–66	9–4 (3–0)	Stroh Center (1,168); Bowling Green, OH
January 17, 2022; 5:00 p.m., ESPN3		Kent State	W 65–62	10–4 (4–0)	Alumni Arena (1,156); Buffalo, NY
January 19, 2022; 7:00 p.m., ESPN3		Akron	W 76–59	11–4 (5–0)	Alumni Arena (1,116); Buffalo, NY
January 22, 2022; 2:00 p.m., ESPN+		at Toledo	L 66–75	11–5 (5–1)	Savage Arena (4,024); Toledo, OH
January 24, 2022; 7:00 p.m., ESPN3		at Ohio	L 66–68	11–6 (5–2)	Convocation Center (378); Athens, OH
January 26, 2022; 7:00 p.m., ESPN+		Ball State	L 70–72	11–7 (5–3)	Alumni Arena (1,099); Buffalo, NY
January 29, 2022; 2:00 p.m., ESPN3		Northern Illinois	W 68–61	12–7 (6–3)	Alumni Arena (1,279); Buffalo, NY
February 2, 2022; Noon, ESPN3		at Eastern Michigan	W 69–62	13–7 (7–3)	Convocation Center (179); Ypsilanti, MI
February 5, 2022; 1:00 p.m., ESPN+		at Central Michigan	W 82–74	14–7 (8–3)	McGuirk Arena (1,285); Mount Pleasant, MI
February 7, 2022; 7:00 p.m., ESPN3		Western Michigan	W 71–64	15–7 (9–3)	Alumni Arena (1,233); Buffalo, NY
February 9, 2022; 7:00 p.m., ESPN3		Eastern Michigan	W 93–68	16–7 (10–3)	Alumni Arena (1,270); Buffalo, NY
February 12, 2022; 2:00 p.m., ESPN3		at Northern Illinois	L 64–69 ^{OT}	16–8 (10–4)	Convocation Center (443); DeKalb, IL
February 16, 2022; 6:30 p.m., ESPN+		at Ball State	W 67–62	17–8 (11–4)	Worthen Arena (1,002); Muncie, IN
February 19, 2022; 1:00 p.m., ESPN3		Miami (OH)	W 83–71	18–8 (12–4)	Alumni Arena (2,214); Buffalo, NY
February 23, 2022; 7:00 p.m., ESPN3		Ohio	W 79–65	19–8 (13–4)	Alumni Arena (1,322); Buffalo, NY
February 26, 2022; 1:00 p.m., ESPN3		at Kent State	W 79–65	20–8 (14–4)	MAC Center (789); Kent, OH
March 2, 2022; 7:00 p.m., ESPN3		at Akron	W 86–60	21–8 (15–4)	James A. Rhodes Arena (475); Akron, OH
March 5, 2022; 2:00 p.m., ESPN+		Bowling Green	W 81–62	22–8 (16–4)	Alumni Arena (2,575); Buffalo, NY
MAC Tournament
March 9, 2022; 4:00 p.m., ESPN+	(2)	vs. (7) Western Michigan; Quarterfinals	W 63–49	23–8	Rocket Mortgage FieldHouse (0); Cleveland, OH
March 11, 2022; 12:30 p.m., ESPN+	(2)	vs. (3) Akron; Semifinals	W 82–43	24–8	Rocket Mortgage FieldHouse (0); Cleveland, OH
March 12, 2022; 11:00 a.m., CBSSN	(2)	vs. (5) Ball State; Final	W 79–75	25–8	Rocket Mortgage FieldHouse (0); Cleveland, OH
NCAA tournament
March 19, 2022; 3:00 p.m., ABC	(13 W)	vs. (4 W) No. 18 Tennessee; First Round	L 67–80	25–9	Thompson–Boling Arena (0); Knoxville, TN
*Non-conference game. ^{#}Rankings from AP Poll. (#) Tournament seedings in parentheses. W=Wichita. All times are in Eastern Time.

== Rankings ==
Ranking movements Legend: — = Not ranked
	Week																		
Poll	Pre	1	2	3	4	5	6	7	8	9	10	11	12	13	14	15	16	17	Final
AP	—	—	—	—	—	—	—	—	—	—	—	—	—	—	—	—	—	—	—
Coaches	—	—	—	—	—	—	—	—	—	—	—	—	—	—	—	—	—	—	—

Legend
	Increase in ranking
	Decrease in ranking
	Not ranked previous week
(RV)	Received votes
(NR)	Not ranked and did not receive votes

The Coaches Poll did not release a Week 2 poll, and the AP Poll did not release a poll after the NCAA Tournament.
