= 2022 MAC women's basketball tournament =

- Classification: Division I
- Season: 2021–22
- Teams: 8
- Site: Rocket Mortgage FieldHouse; Cleveland, Ohio
- Champions: Buffalo (3rd title)
- Winning coach: Felisha Legette-Jack (3rd title)
- MVP: Dyaisha Fair (Buffalo)
- Television: CBSSN, ESPN+
- MAC women's basketball tournaments

2021–22 Mid-American Conference women's basketball standings
	Conf.				Overall
Team	W		L	PCT	W		L	PCT
Toledo	19	–	1	.950	29	–	6	.829
Buffalo †	16	–	4	.800	25	–	9	.735
Akron	13	–	7	.650	17	–	12	.586
Ball State	11	–	8	.579	20	–	13	.606
Northern Illinois	11	–	9	.550	14	–	15	.483
Kent State	10	–	10	.500	19	–	12	.613
Western Michigan	10	–	10	.500	16	–	14	.533
Bowling Green	10	–	10	.500	17	–	16	.515
Ohio	9	–	10	.474	15	–	15	.500
Miami (OH)	4	–	16	.200	8	–	21	.276
Eastern Michigan	4	–	16	.200	7	–	20	.259
Central Michigan	2	–	18	.100	4	–	25	.138
† 2022 MAC tournament winner

The 2022 MAC women's basketball tournament was the postseason basketball tournament that ends the 2021–22 college basketball season in the Mid-American Conference. The entire tournament was held at Rocket Mortgage FieldHouse, in Cleveland, Ohio between March 9 and 12. The MAC Women's Tournament champion received the conference's automatic bid into the 2022 NCAA tournament. Second seeded Buffalo won the tournament with a 79–75 win over Ball State. Dyaisha Fair was named the tournament MVP.

== Format ==
As with the 2021 MAC women's basketball tournament only the top 8 finishing teams qualify and all games were played on a neutral court.

== Venue ==
The 2022 MAC tournament was held at Rocket Mortgage FieldHouse for the 22nd consecutive season. The venue is the home of the Cleveland Cavaliers of the NBA, has a capacity for basketball of 19,432, and is located in downtown Cleveland at One Center Court.

== Seeds ==
8 out of the 12 MAC teams will qualify for the tournament. Teams were seeded by record within the conference, with a tiebreaker system to seed teams with identical conference records.

Seed	School	Conference record	Tiebreaker
1	Toledo	19–1	
2	Buffalo	16–4	
3	Akron	13–7	
4	Northern Illinois	11–9	
5	Ball State	11–8	
6	Bowling Green	10–10	
7	Western Michigan	10–10	
8	Ohio	9–10	
DNQ	Kent State	10–10	
DNQ	Eastern Michigan	4–16	
DNQ	Miami	4–16	
DNQ	Central Michigan	2–18	

== Schedule ==
Game	Time	Matchup	Score	Television
Quarterfinals – Wednesday, March 9 – Rocket Mortgage FieldHouse, Cleveland, OH
1	11:00 am	No. 8 Ohio vs. No. 1 Toledo	67–80	ESPN+
2	1:30 pm	No. 5 Ball State vs. No. 4 Northern Illinois	60–54	ESPN+
3	4:00 pm	No. 7 Western Michigan vs. No. 2 Buffalo	49–63	ESPN+
4	6:30 pm	No. 6 Bowling Green vs. No. 3 Akron	67–81	ESPN+
Semifinals – Friday, March 11 – Rocket Mortgage FieldHouse, Cleveland, OH
5	10:00 am	No. 5 Ball State vs. No. 1 Toledo	71-66	ESPN+/ESPN3
6	Approx. 12:30 pm	No. 3 Akron vs. No. 2 Buffalo	43-82	ESPN+/ESPN3
Championship – Saturday, March 12 – Rocket Mortgage FieldHouse, Cleveland, OH
7	11:00 am	No. 5 Ball State vs. No. 2 Buffalo	75-79	CBSSN
Game times in ET. Rankings denote tournament seed

* denotes overtime period

== Bracket ==
Quarterfinals; Wednesday, March 9, 2022; ESPN+
1	Toledo	80
8	Ohio	67
4	Northern Illinois	54
5	Ball State	60
2	Buffalo	63
7	Western Michigan	49
3	Akron	81
6	Bowling Green	67

Semifinals; Friday, March 11, 2022; ESPN+
1	Toledo	66
5	Ball State	71
2	Buffalo	82
3	Akron	43

Championship; Saturday, March 12, 2022; CBSSN
5	Ball State	75
2	Buffalo	79

== All-Tournament team ==
Tournament MVP – Dyaisha Fair, Buffalo

Player	Team
Sophia Wiard	Toledo
Jordyn Dawson	Akron
Ally Becki	Ball State
Dyaisha Fair	Buffalo
Georgia Woolley	Buffalo

== See also ==
2022 MAC men's basketball tournament
