= 2021–22 Ohio Bobcats women's basketball team =

Intercollegiate basketball season

2021–22 Ohio Bobcats women's basketball

WNIT, first round
- Conference: Mid-American Conference
- Record: 15–15 (9–10 MAC)
- Head coach: Bob Boldon (9th season)
- Assistant coaches: Tavares Jackson; Steph Haas; Marwan Miller
- Home arena: Convocation Center

2021–22 Mid-American Conference women's basketball standings
	Conf.				Overall
Team	W		L	PCT	W		L	PCT
Toledo	19	–	1	.950	29	–	6	.829
Buffalo †	16	–	4	.800	25	–	9	.735
Akron	13	–	7	.650	17	–	12	.586
Ball State	11	–	8	.579	20	–	13	.606
Northern Illinois	11	–	9	.550	14	–	15	.483
Kent State	10	–	10	.500	19	–	12	.613
Western Michigan	10	–	10	.500	16	–	14	.533
Bowling Green	10	–	10	.500	17	–	16	.515
Ohio	9	–	10	.474	15	–	15	.500
Miami (OH)	4	–	16	.200	8	–	21	.276
Eastern Michigan	4	–	16	.200	7	–	20	.259
Central Michigan	2	–	18	.100	4	–	25	.138
† 2022 MAC tournament winner

The 2021–22 Ohio Bobcats women's basketball team represented Ohio University during the 2021–22 NCAA Division I women's basketball season. The Bobcats, led by ninth-year head coach Bob Boldon, played their home games at the Convocation Center in Athens, Ohio as a member of the Mid-American Conference (MAC). The Bobcats finished non-conference play at 6–3. During a conference win at Central Michigan on January 15, Cece Hooks passed Caroline Mast as the leading scorer in Ohio basketball history. Two games later, against Bowling Green, she passed Toledo's Kim Knuth as the leading scorer in MAC basketball history. They finished the regular season 15–13 and 9–10 in the MAC. They were knocked out of the MAC tournament in the quarterfinals by top-seeded Toledo and in the first round of the WNIT by eventual champion South Dakota State.

== Offseason ==
=== Departures ===
Departures
Name	Number	Pos.	Height	Year	Hometown	Reason
Deesh Beck	32	F	5' 9"	Junior	Grand Rapids, MI	Transferred to Wright State

=== 2021 recruiting class ===
Recruiting class
Name	Number	Pos.	Height	High school	Hometown
Yaya Felder	2	G	5' 8"	Conrad	Hartford, CT

== Preseason ==
Prior to the season Ohio was picked first in the MAC preseason poll. Cece Hooks and Erica Johnson were named to the preseason first team all-conference.

=== Preseason rankings ===
MAC preseason poll
Predicted finish	Team	Votes (1st place)
1	Ohio	132 (4)
2	Bowling Green	124 (3)
3	Buffalo	123 (3)
4	Kent State	102
5	Eastern Michigan	83 (1)
6	Central Michigan	80
7	Northern Illinois	79
8	Toledo	67
9	Ball State	65 (1)
10	Western Michigan	31
11	Miami	27
12	Akron	23

MAC tournament champion: Buffalo (5), Ohio (3), BGSU (2), Ball State (1), EMU (1)

=== Preseason All-MAC ===
Preseason All-MAC teams
Team	Player	Position	Year
Preseason All-MAC 1st team	Cece Hooks	G	Sr.
Preseason All-MAC 1st team	Erica Johnson	G	R-Jr.

=== Award watch lists ===
Award	Player	Position	Year	Source
Naismith College Player of the Year	Cece Hooks	G	Sr.	
Cheryl Miller Award	Erica Johnson	G	R-Jr.	
Becky Hammon Award	Cece Hooks	G	Sr.	

== Roster ==
2021–22 Ohio Bobcats women's basketball team
Players
Coaches

Pos.	#	Name	Height	Year	Previous school	Hometown
G	1	Cece Hooks	5 ft 8 in (1.73 m)	Sr	Thurgood Marshall	Dayton, OH
G	4	Erica Johnson	5 ft 11 in (1.8 m)	RS Jr	Mansfield Senior	Mansfield, OH
G	5	Caitlyn Kroll	5 ft 10 in (1.78 m)	RS Jr	Bridgeport; Saint Francis (PA)	Bridgeport, OH
G	13	Kaylee Bambule	5 ft 8 in (1.73 m)	RS Jr	Montini Catholic	Plainfield, IL
F	20	Abby Garnett	6 ft 1 in (1.85 m)	RS So	Golden	Golden, CO
G	25	Hunter Rogan	5 ft 8 in (1.73 m)	Sr	Urbana	Urbana, OH
F	35	Alexandra Antonova	6 ft 2 in (1.88 m)	RS So	Teays Valley	Moscow, Russia
F	41	Gabby Burris	5 ft 11 in (1.8 m)	Sr	Liberty Union	Baltimore, OH
G	23	Jasmine Hale	5 ft 8 in (1.73 m)	Jr	West Clemont	Cincinnati, OH
F	44	Ella Pope	5 ft 11 in (1.8 m)	RS Fr	Timpview	Orem, UT
G	11	Peyton Guice	5 ft 11 in (1.8 m)	So	Westerville South	Westerville, OH
G	3	Madi Mace	5 ft 11 in (1.8 m)	RS Fr	Parkersburg	Parkersburg, WV
G	14	Kate Dennis	6 ft 1 in (1.85 m)	Fr	Guilford	Rockford, IL
G	22	Kendall Hale	5 ft 8 in (1.73 m)	Fr	West Clemont	Cincinnati, OH
G	2	Yaya Felder	5 ft 8 in (1.73 m)	Fr	Conrad	Hartford, CT

Head coach

- Bob Boldon (Walsh)

Assistant coach(es)

- Tavares Jackson (Minnesota)
- Steph Haas (Florida Gulf Coast)
- Marwan Miller (Franklin (OH))

Legend

- (C) Team captain
- (S) Suspended
- (I) Ineligible
- (W) Walk-on
- Injured
- Current redshirt

Roster
Last update: September 25, 2024

== Schedule ==
Date time, TV	Rank^{#}	Opponent^{#}	Result	Record	Site (attendance) city, state
Non-conference regular season
November 9, 2021*; 7:00 p.m., ACCNX		at Notre Dame	L 69–105	0–1	Purcell Pavilion (4553); Notre Dame, IN
November 13, 2021*; 7:00 p.m., ESPN+		at Liberty	L 63–66	0–2	Liberty Arena (787); Lynchburg, VA
November 16, 2021*; 11:00 a.m., ESPN+		at Cincinnati	W 73–62	1–2	Fifth Third Arena (1723); Cincinnati, OH
November 20, 2021*; 1:00 p.m., ESPN3		Mercyhurst	W 90–46	2–2	Convocation Center (826); Athens, OH
November 29, 2021*; 7:00 p.m., ESPN3		Florida A&M	W 98–45	3–2	Convocation Center (618); Athens, OH
December 4, 2021*; 1:00 p.m., ESPN+		Richmond	W 98–89	4–2	Convocation Center; Athens, OH
December 15, 2021*; 8:00 p.m., BTN Plus		at Minnesota	L 93–99	4–3	Williams Arena (2751); Minneapolis, MN
December 20, 2021*; 1:00 p.m.		vs. UMass Lowell; FIU Holiday Hoops Showdown	W 74–60	5–3	Ocean Bank Convocation Center; Miami, FL
December 21, 2021*; 11:00 a.m.		vs. Binghamton; FIU Holiday Hoops Showdown	W 76–67	6–3	Ocean Bank Convocation Center (77); Miami, FL
MAC regular season
December 29, 2021; 7:00 p.m., ESPN3		at Miami (OH)	Postponed		Millett Hall; Oxford, OH
January 1, 2022; 1:00 p.m., ESPN3		Eastern Michigan	Postponed		Convocation Center; Athens, OH
January 5, 2022; 7:00 p.m., ESPN3		at Akron	Postponed		James A. Rhodes Arena; Akron, OH
January 8, 2022; 1:00 p.m., ESPN3		Northern Illinois	L 68–71	6–4 (0–1)	Convocation Center (698); Athens, OH
January 12, 2022; 7:00 p.m., ESPN3		Buffalo	Postponed		Convocation Center; Athens, OH
January 12, 2022; 7:00 p.m., ESPN3		Kent State	W 70–64	7–4 (1–1)	Convocation Center (516); Athens, OH
January 15, 2022; 1:00 p.m., ESPN3		at Central Michigan	W 75–65	8–4 (2–1)	McGuirk Arena (1326); Mount Pleasant, MI
January 17, 2022; 7:00 p.m., ESPN+		at Miami (OH); Rescheduled from December 29	L 60–63	8–5 (2–2)	Millett Hall (171); Oxford, OH
January 22, 2022; 3:30 p.m., ESPN+		Bowling Green	W 85–70	9–5 (3–2)	Convocation Center (1001); Athens, OH
January 24, 2022; TBD, ESPN+		Buffalo; Rescheduled from January 12	W 68–66	10–5 (4–2)	Convocation Center (378); Athens, OH
January 26, 2022; 7:00 p.m., ESPN3		at Toledo	W 79–72	11–5 (5–2)	Savage Arena (3257); Toledo, OH
January 29, 2022; 7:00 p.m., ESPN3		at Western Michigan	L 64–74	11–6 (5–3)	University Arena (845); Kalamazoo, MI
February 2, 2022; 7:00 p.m., ESPN3		Ball State	L 74–84	11–7 (5–4)	Convocation Center (623); Athens, OH
February 6, 2022; 2:00 p.m., ESPN+		at Northern Illinois	L 70–80	11–8 (5–5)	Convocation Center (256); DeKalb, IL
February 9, 2022; 6:30 p.m., ESPN3		at Ball State	Postponed		Worthen Arena; Muncie, IN
February 12, 2022; 1:00 p.m., ESPN3		Western Michigan	L 73–80	11–9 (5–6)	Convocation Center (491); Athens, OH
February 14, 2022; 7:00 p.m., ESPN3		Eastern Michigan; Rescheduled from January 1	W 66–53	12–9 (6–6)	Convocation Center (304); Athens, OH
February 16, 2022; 7:00 p.m., ESPN+		Toledo	L 73–76	12–10 (6–7)	Convocation Center (462); Athens, OH
February 19, 2022; 1:00 p.m., ESPN+		at Bowling Green	W 82–69	13–10 (7–7)	Stroh Center (1249); Bowling Green, OH
February 21, 2022; 5:00 p.m., ESPN3		at Akron; Rescheduled from January 5	W 69–66	14–10 (8–7)	James A. Rhodes Arena (435); Akron, OH
February 23, 2022; 7:00 p.m., ESPN3		at Buffalo	L 65–79	14–11 (8–8)	Alumni Arena (1,322); Amherst, NY
February 26, 2022; 3:30 p.m., ESPN3		Akron	L 77–88	14–12 (8–9)	Convocation Center (1,004); Athens, OH
March 2, 2022; 7:00 p.m., ESPN3		Miami (OH)	W 73–64	15–12 (9–9)	Convocation Center (843); Athens, OH
March 5, 2022; 1:00 p.m., ESPN+		at Kent State	L 50–59	15–13 (9–10)	MAC Center (797); Kent, OH
MAC Tournament
March 9, 2022; 11:00 a.m., ESPN+	(8)	vs. (1) Toledo; MAC quarterfinals	L 67–80	15–14	Rocket Mortgage FieldHouse; Cleveland, OH
WNIT
March 17, 2022; 8:00 p.m.		at South Dakota State	L 57–87	15–15	Frost Arena (1,774); Brookings, SD
*Non-conference game. ^{#}Rankings from AP poll. (#) Tournament seedings in parentheses. All times are in Eastern.

== Awards and honors ==
=== Weekly awards ===
Weekly award honors
Honors	Player	Position	Date awarded	Source
MAC player of the week	Cece Hooks	G	December 27	
MAC player of the week	Cece Hooks	G	January 17	
MAC player of the week	Cece Hooks	G	January 24	

=== All-MAC Awards ===
After the season Cece Hooks won an unprecedented 4th MAC defensive player of the year.

Postseason All-MAC teams
Team	Player	Position	Year
All-MAC 1st team	Cece Hooks	G	Sr.
All-MAC 3rd team	Erica Johnson	G	R-Jr.
All-MAC Honorable Mention	Gabby Burris	F	Sr.
MAC Defensive Player of the Year	Cece Hooks	G	Sr.
All-MAC Defensive team	Cece Hooks	G	Sr.
