= Toledo Rockets basketball =

Toledo Rockets basketball may refer to either of the basketball teams that represent the University of Toledo:

- Toledo Rockets men's basketball
- Toledo Rockets women's basketball
