= 2022–23 Toledo Rockets women's basketball team =

American college basketball season

2022–23 Toledo Rockets women's basketball

MAC regular-season and tournament champions

NCAA tournament, second round
- Conference: Mid-American Conference
- West Division
- Record: 29–5 (16–2 MAC)
- Head coach: Tricia Cullop (15th season)
- Associate head coach: Jessie Ivey
- Assistant coaches: Danielle Page; Mark Stephens
- Home arena: Savage Arena

2022–23 Mid-American Conference women's basketball standings
	Conf.				Overall
Team	W		L	PCT	W		L	PCT
Toledo†	16	–	2	.889	29	–	5	.853
Bowling Green	14	–	4	.778	30	–	6	.833
Ball State	14	–	4	.778	26	–	8	.765
Kent State	12	–	6	.667	21	–	11	.656
Akron	8	–	10	.444	17	–	13	.567
Northern Illinois	8	–	10	.444	16	–	17	.485
Eastern Michigan	7	–	11	.389	15	–	15	.500
Buffalo	7	–	11	.389	12	–	16	.429
Western Michigan	7	–	11	.389	12	–	17	.414
Miami (OH)	7	–	11	.389	12	–	19	.387
Central Michigan	4	–	14	.222	6	–	23	.207
Ohio	4	–	14	.222	6	–	23	.207
† 2023 MAC tournament winner As of March 24, 2023

The 2022–23 Toledo Rockets women's basketball team represented University of Toledo during the 2022–23 NCAA Division I women's basketball season. The Rockets, led by fifteenth-year head coach Tricia Cullop, played their home games at Savage Arena in Toledo, Ohio, as members of the Mid-American Conference (MAC). The Rockets completed MAC play with a 16–2 record to claim the regular season championship for the second straight season. As the top seed they defeated Buffalo, Kent State and Bowling Green to win the MAC tournament. They were placed as the twelfth seed in the Seattle Region 3 of the 2023 NCAA tournament where they defeated Iowa State in the first round. They lost to Tennessee in the second round.

== Roster ==
2022–23 Toledo Rockets women's basketball team
Players
Coaches

Pos.	#	Name	Height	Year	Previous school	Hometown
G/F	1	Nan Garcia	6 ft 0 in (1.83 m)	Jr	Jeffersonville; Penn State	Jeffersonville, IN
G	2	Sophia Wiard (C)	5 ft 7 in (1.7 m)	Sr	Oakridge	Muskegon, MI
G	3	Ella Doherty	5 ft 11 in (1.8 m)	So		Powmill, Scotland
G	4	Soleil Barnes	5 ft 6 in (1.68 m)	Sr	Southfield	Southfield, MI
G	5	Quinesha Lockett (C)	5 ft 10 in (1.78 m)	Sr	Benson	Omaha, NE
G	10	Justina King	5 ft 8 in (1.73 m)	Sr	Ribét Academy; Long Beach State	Scarborough, ON
G	12	Jayda Jansen	5 ft 9 in (1.75 m)	Sr	Sun Prairie East; Maryville (MO)	Sun Prairie, WI
G	22	Khera Gross (C)	5 ft 9 in (1.75 m)	Jr	Ben Davis	Indianapolis, IN
G/F	24	Yaniah Curry	5 ft 8 in (1.73 m)	Jr	Francis Howell Central	Cottleville, MO
G/F	33	Sammi Mikonowicz	5 ft 10 in (1.78 m)	Jr	Rossford	Rossford, OH
F	34	Jessica Cook	6 ft 2 in (1.88 m)	So	Cicero-North Syracuse	Clay, NY
C	51	Hannah Noveroske	6 ft 5 in (1.96 m)	Sr	Michigan City	Michigan City, IN

Head coach

- Tricia Cullop (Purdue)

Assistant coach(es)

- Jessie Ivey (West Florida)
- Danielle Page (Nebraska)
- Mark Stephens (Morehead State)

Legend

- (C) Team captain
- (S) Suspended
- (I) Ineligible
- (W) Walk-on
- Injured
- Current redshirt

Roster
Last update: August 28, 2024

== Schedule ==
Date time, TV	Rank^{#}	Opponent^{#}	Result	Record	Site (attendance) city, state
Exhibition
October 30, 2022*; 2:00 p.m.		Ferris State	W 87–43		Savage Arena; Toledo, OH
Non-conference regular season
November 7, 2022*; 11:00 a.m., ESPN3		Wright State	W 88–56	1–0	Savage Arena (4,617); Toledo, OH
November 11, 2022*; 5:30 p.m., ESPN3		Canisius	W 93–66	2–0	Savage Arena (3,816); Toledo, OH
November 16, 2022*; 11:00 a.m., ESPN+		at Cincinnati	W 74–71 ^{OT}	3–0	Fifth Third Arena (3,786); Cincinnati, OH
November 20, 2022*; 1:00 p.m., ESPN+		Duke	L 41–58	3–1	Savage Arena (5,427); Toledo, OH
November 25, 2022*; 1:15 p.m., FloSports		vs. Penn State; Daytona Beach Invitational	L 59–60	3–2	Ocean Center (350); Daytona Beach, FL
November 26, 2022*; 1:15 p.m., FloSports		vs. UT Arlington; Daytona Beach Invitational	W 80–70	4–2	Ocean Center (275); Daytona Beach, FL
November 30, 2022*; 11:30 a.m., ESPN+		at Loyola (MD)	W 62–40	5–2	Reitz Arena (1,134); Baltimore, MD
December 4, 2022*; 1:00 p.m., ESPN+		Missouri State	W 91–63	6–2	Savage Arena (1,134); Toledo, OH
December 8, 2022*; 7:00 p.m., BTN+		at No. 14 Michigan	W 71–68	7–2	Crisler Center (2,798); Ann Arbor, MI
December 11, 2022*; 2:00 p.m., ESPN+		Dayton	W 57–45	8–2	Savage Arena (3,548); Toledo, OH
December 21, 2022*; 7:00 p.m., ESPN+		Oakland	W 74–44	9–2	Savage Arena (3,315); Toledo, OH
MAC regular season
January 4, 2023; 7:00 p.m., ESPN+		Western Michigan	W 71–53	10–2 (1–0)	Savage Arena (3,748); Toledo, OH
January 7, 2023; 2:00 p.m., ESPN3		at Northern Illinois	L 66–67	10–3 (1–1)	Convocation Center (613); DeKalb, IL
January 11, 2023; 7:00 p.m., ESPN+		Ball State	W 83–76	11–3 (2–1)	Savage Arena (613); Toledo, OH
January 14, 2023; 2:00 p.m., ESPN3		at Kent State	W 77–68	12–3 (3–1)	MAC Center (2,740); Kent, OH
January 18, 2023; 7:00 p.m., ESPN+		at Bowling Green	L 76–88	12–4 (3–2)	Stroh Center (2,716); Bowling Green, OH
January 21, 2023; 2:00 p.m., ESPN3		Akron	W 76–63	13–4 (4–2)	Savage Arena (4,689); Toledo, OH
January 25, 2023; 7:00 p.m., ESPN+		Miami (OH)	W 82–63	14–4 (5–2)	Savage Arena (3,309); Toledo, OH
January 28, 2023; 1:00 p.m., ESPN3		at Eastern Michigan	W 79–73 ^{OT}	15–4 (6–2)	Convocation Center (2,015); Ypsilanti, MI
February 1, 2023; 7:00 p.m., ESPN+		at Central Michigan	W 74–60	16–4 (7–2)	McGuirk Arena (1,085); Mount Pleasant, MI
February 4, 2023; 2:00 p.m., ESPN3		Ohio	W 66–55	17–4 (8–2)	Savage Arena (4,527); Toledo, OH
February 8, 2023; 7:00 p.m., ESPN+		Buffalo	W 91–73	18–4 (9–2)	Savage Arena (3,610); Toledo, OH
February 11, 2023; 1:00 p.m., ESPN3		at Miami (OH)	W 71–58	19–4 (10–2)	Millett Hall (1,154); Oxford, OH
February 15, 2023; 7:00 p.m., ESPN+		at Western Michigan	W 75–44	20–4 (11–2)	University Arena (628); Kalamazoo, MI
February 18, 2023; 2:00 p.m., ESPN3		Eastern Michigan	W 84–64	21–4 (12–2)	Savage Arena (4,635); Toledo, OH
February 22, 2023; 7:00 p.m., ESPN+		at Akron	W 80–76	22–4 (13–2)	Rhodes Arena (473); Akron, OH
February 25, 2023; 1:00 p.m., ESPN3		at Ball State	W 72–70	23–4 (14–2)	Worthen Arena (2,150); Muncie, IN
March 1, 2023; 7:00 p.m., ESPN+		Kent State	W 64–60	24–4 (15–2)	Savage Arena (3,985); Toledo, OH
March 4, 2023; 2:00 p.m., ESPN3		Bowling Green	W 62–56	25–4 (16–2)	Savage Arena (6,086); Toledo, OH
MAC women's tournament
March 8, 2023; 11:00 a.m., ESPN+	(1)	vs. (8) Buffalo; Quarterfinals	W 75–74 ^{OT}	26–4	Rocket Mortgage FieldHouse; Cleveland, OH
March 10, 2023; 10:00 a.m., ESPN+	(1)	vs. (4) Kent State; Semifinals	W 68–58	27–4	Rocket Mortgage FieldHouse; Cleveland, OH
March 11, 2023; 11:00 a.m., CBSSN	(1)	vs. (2) Bowling Green; Championship game	W 73–58	28–4	Rocket Mortgage FieldHouse (2,810); Cleveland, OH
NCAA women's tournament
March 18, 2023*; 3:30 p.m., ESPN2	(12 S3)	vs. (5 S3) No. 17 Iowa State; First round	W 80–73	29–4	Thompson–Boling Arena (6,871); Knoxville, TN
March 20, 2023*; 6:00 p.m., ESPN2	(12 S3)	at (4 S3) No. 24 Tennessee; Second round	L 47–94	29–5	Thompson–Boling Arena (5,486); Knoxville, TN
*Non-conference game. ^{#}Rankings from AP poll. (#) Tournament seedings in parentheses. S=Seattle 3. All times are in Eastern.

== See also ==
- 2022–23 Toledo Rockets men's basketball team
