= Texas Longhorns basketball =

Texas Longhorns basketball may refer to:

- Texas Longhorns men's basketball
- Texas Longhorns women's basketball
