= Miami Hurricanes women's basketball =

NCAA Division 1 program

2026–27 Miami Hurricanes women's basketball team
- University: University of Miami
- Head coach: Tricia Cullop (3rd season)
- Location: Coral Gables, Florida, U.S.
- Arena: Watsco Center
- Conference: Atlantic Coast Conference
- Nickname: Hurricanes
- Colors: Orange, green, and white

NCAA Division I tournament Elite Eight
- 2023
Other NCAA Division I tournament results
Sweet Sixteen	1992, 2023
Appearances	1989, 1992, 1993, 1998, 2003, 2004, 2011, 2012, 2013, 2015, 2016, 2017, 2018, 2019, 2022, 2023

Conference tournament champions
- 1991, 1992, 1993

Conference regular-season champions
- 1992, 1993, 2011

Uniforms
Home	Away	Alternate

The Miami Hurricanes women's basketball team represents the University of Miami in women's basketball. The school competes in the Atlantic Coast Conference in Division I of the National Collegiate Athletic Association (NCAA).

The Hurricanes play their home games at Watsco Center on the University of Miami campus in Coral Gables, Florida.

== Year by year record ==
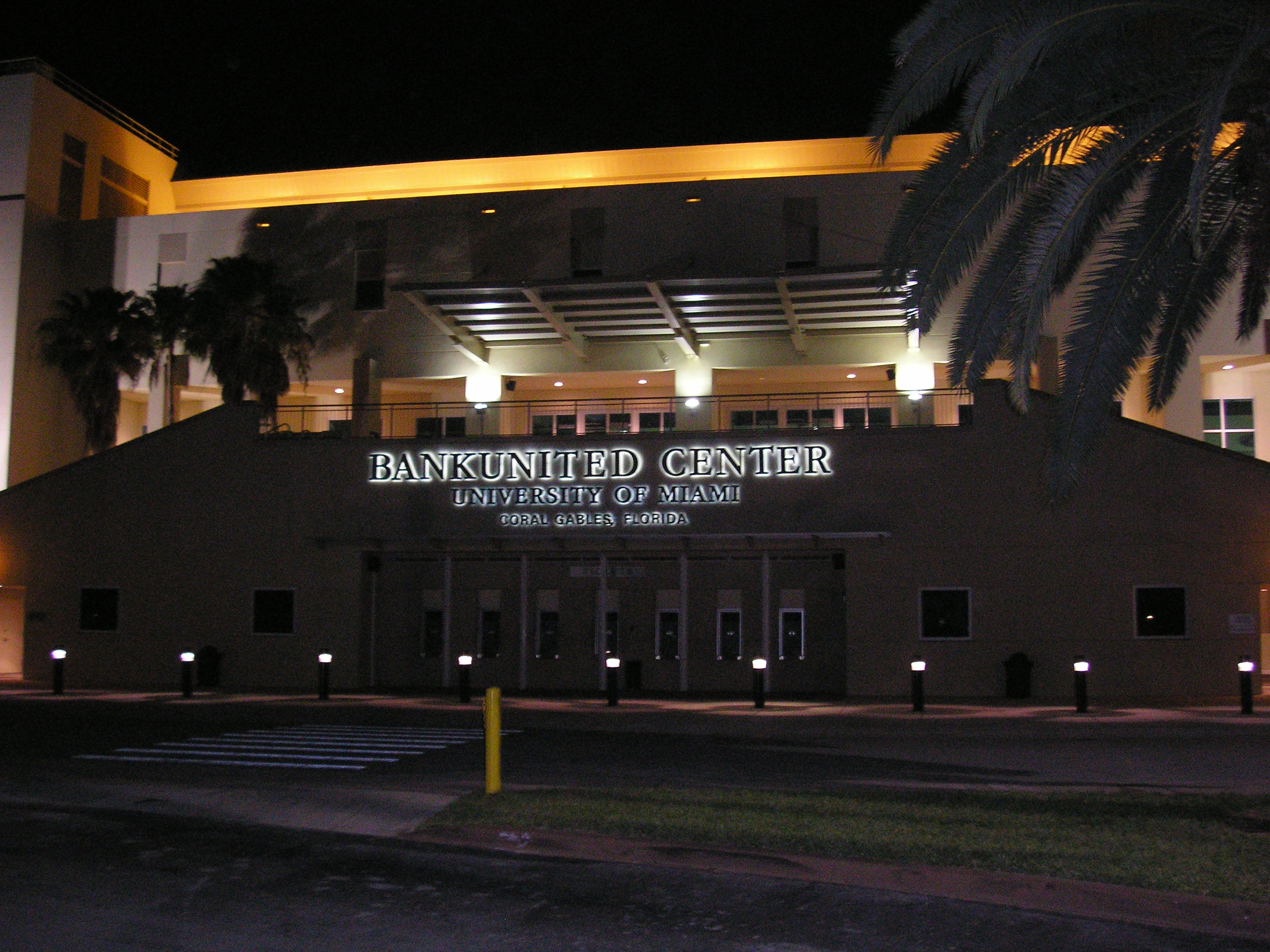
Watsco Center, the home arena of the Miami Hurricanes women's basketball team, on the University of Miami campus, May 2009

As of the 2024–25 season, the Hurricanes have an 885–625 all-time record since the program's launch in 1972. The team's best finish in the NCAA tournament was in 2023 when they reached the Elite Eight, losing to LSU 42–54 in the tournament's regional finals.

Season	Coach	Record	Conference	Conference Record	Postseason Finish
1972–73	Barry Schimer	2–6	FAIAW	n/a (5th in Tournament)	n/a
1973–74	Barry Schimer	6–3	FAIAW	n/a (5th in Tournament)	n/a
1974–75	Barry Schimer	8–6	FAIAW	n/a (2nd in Tournament)	n/a
1975–76	Shula Feuer	7–13	FAIAW	n/a (5th in Tournament)	n/a
1976–77	Shula Feuer	9–11	FAIAW	n/a (T-3rd in Tournament)	n/a
1977–78	Isabella Hutchinson	8–8	FAIAW	n/a (5th in Tournament)	n/a
1978–79	Lin Dunn	10–13	FAIAW	n/a (5th in Tournament)	n/a
1979–80	Lin Dunn	18–16	FAIAW	n/a (T-3rd in Tournament)	n/a
1980–81	Lin Dunn	24–15	FAIAW	n/a (1st in Tournament)	n/a
1981–82	Lin Dunn	19–10	FAIAW	n/a (T-3rd in Tournament)	n/a
1982–83	Lin Dunn	14–13	n/a	n/a	n/a
1983–84	Lin Dunn	19–12	n/a	n/a	n/a
1984–85	Lin Dunn	21–7	n/a	n/a	n/a
1985–86	Lin Dunn	9–18	n/a	n/a	n/a
1986–87	Lin Dunn	15–15	n/a	n/a	n/a
1987–88	Ken Patrick	14–13	n/a	n/a	n/a
1988–89	Ferne Labati	21–8	n/a	n/a	NCAA First Round
1989–90	Ferne Labati	25–6	n/a	n/a	WNIT First Round
1990–91	Ferne Labati	20–10	NSWAC	9–3 (1st in Tournament)	n/a
1991–92	Ferne Labati	30–2	Big East Conference	18–0 (1st)	NCAA Sweet 16
1992–93	Ferne Labati	24–7	Big East Conference	15–3 (T-1st)	NCAA Second Round
1993–94	Ferne Labati	10–17	Big East Conference	7–11 (T-6th)	n/a
1994–95	Ferne Labati	11–16	Big East Conference	8–10 (6th)	n/a
1995–96	Ferne Labati	14–13	Big East Conference	9–9 (T-4th, T-1st in BE 7)	n/a
1996–97	Ferne Labati	15–14	Big East Conference	8–10 (T-6th, T-2nd in BE 7)	n/a
1997–98	Ferne Labati	19–10	Big East Conference	13–5 (3rd, 2nd in BE 7)	NCAA First Round
1998–99	Ferne Labati	15–14	Big East Conference	9–9 (T-6th)	WNIT First Round
1999-00	Ferne Labati	14–15	Big East Conference	7–9 (T-6th)	n/a
2000–01	Ferne Labati	13–15	Big East Conference	6–10 (T-8th)	n/a
2001–02	Ferne Labati	19–12	Big East Conference	10–6 (5th)	WNIT First Round
2002–03	Ferne Labati	18–13	Big East Conference	8–8 (7th)	NCAA First Round
2003–04	Ferne Labati	22–7	Big East Conference	11–5 (T-4th)	NCAA First Round
2004–05	Ferne Labati	13–16	Atlantic Coast Conference	4–10 9th	n/a
2005–06	Katie Meier	17–13	Atlantic Coast Conference	6–8 6th	WNIT Second Round
2006–07	Katie Meier	11–19	Atlantic Coast Conference	2–12 (11th)	n/a
2007–08	Katie Meier	9–21	Atlantic Coast Conference	2–12 (T-10th)	n/a
2008–09	Katie Meier	13–17	Atlantic Coast Conference	2–12 (T-10th)	n/a
2009–10	Katie Meier	22–14	Atlantic Coast Conference	4–10 (T-10th)	WNIT Finals
2010–11	Katie Meier	28–5	Atlantic Coast Conference	12–2 (T-1st)	NCAA Second Round
2011–12	Katie Meier	26–6	Atlantic Coast Conference	14–2 (2nd)	NCAA Second Round
2012–13	Katie Meier	21–11	Atlantic Coast Conference	11–7 (T-4th)	NCAA First Round
2013–14	Katie Meier	16–15	Atlantic Coast Conference	8–8 (8th)	WNIT First Round
2014–15	Katie Meier	20–13	Atlantic Coast Conference	8–8 (8th)	NCAA Second Round
2015–16	Katie Meier	24–9	Atlantic Coast Conference	10–6 (T-5th)	NCAA First Round
2016–17	Katie Meier	24–9	Atlantic Coast Conference	10–6 (7th)	NCAA Second Round
2017–18	Katie Meier	21–11	Atlantic Coast Conference	10–6 (T-6th)	NCAA First Round
2018–19	Katie Meier	25–9	Atlantic Coast Conference	12–4 (T-3rd)	NCAA Second Round
2019–20	Katie Meier	15–15	Atlantic Coast Conference	7–11 (T-11th)	
2020–21	Katie Meier	11–11	Atlantic Coast Conference	8–10 (T-9th)	
2021–22	Katie Meier	21–13	Atlantic Coast Conference	10–8 (T-7th)	NCAA Second Round
2022–23	Katie Meier	22–13	Atlantic Coast Conference	11–7 (T-5th)	NCAA Elite Eight
2023–24	Katie Meier	19–12	Atlantic Coast Conference	8–10 (9th)	
2024–25	Tricia Cullop	14–15	Atlantic Coast Conference	4–14 (16th)	
2025–26	Tricia Cullop	18–15	Atlantic Coast Conference	8–10 (12th)	WBIT Second Round

== NCAA tournament results ==
Miami has appeared in the NCAA Division I women's basketball tournament sixteen times. They have a record of 11–16.

Year	Seed	Round	Opponent	Result
1989	#8	First Round	(9) Oklahoma State	L 69–93
1992	#2	Second Round; Sweet Sixteen	(7) North Carolina (3) Vanderbilt	W 86–72; L 67–77
1993	#5	First Round; Second Round	(12) St. Peter's (4) Western Kentucky	W 61–44; L 63–78
1998	#11	First Round	(6) Clemson	L 49–60
2003	#11	First Round	(6) New Mexico	L 85–91
2004	#5	First Round	(12) Maryland	L 85–86
2011	#3	First Round; Second Round	(14) Gardner-Webb (6) Oklahoma	W 80–62; L 83–88
2012	#3	First Round; Second Round	(14) Idaho State (11) Gonzaga	W 70–42; L 54–65
2013	#8	First Round	(9) Iowa	L 53–69
2015	#11	First Round; Second Round	(6) Washington (3)Iowa	W 86–80; L 70–88
2016	#5	First Round	(12) South Dakota State	L 71–74
2017	#4	First Round; Second Round	(13) Florida Gulf Coast (12) Quinnipiac	W 62–60; L 78–85
2018	#8	First Round	(9) Quinnipiac	L 72–86
2019	#4	First Round; Second Round	(13) Florida Gulf Coast (5) Arizona State	W 69–62; L 55–57
2022	#8	First Round; Second Round	(9) South Florida (1) South Carolina	W 78–66; L 33–49
2023	#9	First Round; Second Round; Sweet Sixteen; Elite Eight	(8) Oklahoma State (1) Indiana (4) Villanova (3) LSU	W 62–61; W 70–68; W 70–65; L 42–54

== Retired numbers ==
Miami Hurricanes retired numbers
No.	Player	Position	Career	Year of Retirement
2	Tamara James	F	2002-06	2010
10	Octavia Blue	F	1994-98	2016
11	Maria Rivera	G	1984-88	2010
24	Frances Savage	F	1987-92	2003

== Roster ==
2026–27 Miami Hurricanes women's basketball team
Players
Coaches

Pos.	#	Name	Height	Year	Previous school	Hometown
F	3	Soma Okolo	6 ft 1 in (1.85 m)	So	Glenn	Leander, TX
G	4	Mya Herman	5 ft 7 in (1.7 m)	Sr	Southeastern	Canandaigua, NY
G	5	Ahnay Adams	5 ft 6 in (1.68 m)	Jr	Tilton	New Bedford, MA
F	12	Natalie Wetzel	6 ft 3 in (1.91 m)	So	Peters Township	McMurray, PA
C	13	Jess-Mine Zodia	6 ft 3 in (1.91 m)	Fr		Moissy-Cramayel, France
G	14	Gal Raviv	5 ft 9 in (1.75 m)	Jr	Quinnipiac	Kadima, Israel
F	17	Anna Liepina	6 ft 3 in (1.91 m)	Fr		Daugavpils, Latvia
G	18	Maja Uranker	6 ft 0 in (1.83 m)	Fr		Celje, Slovenia
F	22	Gianna Corbitt	6 ft 1 in (1.85 m)	Jr	Chattanooga	Oakland Park, FL
G/F	26	Dayana Mendes	6 ft 3 in (1.91 m)	Jr	USC	Paris, France
G	33	Amarachi Kimpson	5 ft 8 in (1.73 m)	Sr	UNLV	Little Elm, TX

Head coach

- Tricia Cullop (Purdue)

Assistant coach(es)

- Jessie Ivey (West Florida)
- Gene Hill (Coker)
- Danielle Page (Nebraska)
- Barbara Farris (Tulane)

Legend

- (C) Team captain
- (S) Suspended
- (I) Ineligible
- (W) Walk-on
- Injured
- Current redshirt

Roster
Last update: August 30, 2026
