= Cece Hooks =

American basketball player

Personal information
- Born: May 30, 1999 (age 27)
- Listed height: 5 ft 8 in (1.73 m)

Career information
- High school: Thurgood Marshall (Dayton, Ohio)
- College: Ohio (2017–2022)
- Position: Point guard

Career highlights
- MAC Player of the Year (2021); 4× First-team All-MAC (2019–2022); Third-team All-MAC (2018); 4× MAC Defensive Player of the Year (2019–2022); 5× MAC All-Defensive Team (2018–2022); MAC Freshman of the Year (2018); MAC All-Freshman Team (2018); All-American Honerable Mention (2021)
- Stats at Basketball Reference

Cierra Marie Hooks (born May 30, 1999) is an American basketball player. She played college basketball with the Ohio Bobcats of the Mid-American Conference (MAC).

== Early life ==
Hooks grew up in Dayton, Ohio, where she attended and played basketball at Thurgood Marshall High School. During her sophomore year she was considered a likely top 30 recruit but missed much of the year with a torn meniscus. She worked her way back to average 17 points, 12 rebounds and five assists per game her senior year. She also played AAU basketball for All Ohio Black. She was rated as a four-star recruit by Prospects Nation. She took one visit to Ohio University and committed.

== College career ==
Hooks played in 30 games and averaged 13.5 points as a freshman. She scored 406 points which was the second most for a freshman in Ohio history and her 100 steals were a program record at the time. After the season she was named to the MAC All-Freshman Team, All-MAC Third Team and MAC Freshman of the Year.

Her sophomore season saw her average 18.2 points, 5.4 rebounds, 4.1 steals and 3.1 assists in 36 games as the point guard for an Ohio team that won 30 games. She broke her own program record for single-season steals with 112 and her 251 field goals was also a school record. She was named All-MAC first team and won her first MAC Defensive Player of the Year.

As a junior she averaged 17.7 points, 5.1 rebounds, 3.7 steals and 3.4 assists per game. Her 106 steals led the MAC and were fifth in the county. In a loss to Akron on February 22 she tied the school record with 41 points and was 17 for 26 from the field. She was again named All-MAC first team and won her second MAC Defensive Player of the Year.

During a senior season shortened by the COVID-19 pandemic, she averaged 25.1 points per game, good for third in the country, and was an honorable-mention All-American. She also led her team in rebounds, steals and assists. In the second game of the season she led Ohio with 32 points in an upset of national power Notre Dame. On March 6, against rival Miami, she notched only the second triple double in program history. She had 31 points on 14 of 19 shooting with 11 assists, 10 steals and four rebounds. She was named All-MAC first team and MAC Defensive Player of the Year for the third consecutive year and also won MAC Player of the Year.

After her senior season Hooks declared for the 2021 WNBA draft. However, she removed her name and returned to the Bobcats for a fifth season as allowed by a temporary rule change as a result of the COVID-19 pandemic. Prior to the season she was added to the Naismith watch list for National Player of the year and the Hammon watch list for mid-major player of the year. On January 30, in a win at Central Michigan, she scored 30 points and surpassed Caroline Mast as the leading scorer in Ohio basketball history. Two games later, against Bowling Green, she passed Toledo's Kim Knuth as the leading scorer in MAC basketball history. She was named All-MAC first team and MAC Co-Defensive Player of the Year. She is the only four time defensive player of the year in MAC basketball history. She finished her career 23rd in NCAA history in career points and 5th all-time in career steals.

== Professional career ==
On April 13, 2022, she signed with the Minnesota Lynx of the WNBA. On April 28, Minnesota released her.

== Career statistics ==
Legend
GP	Games played	GS	Games started	MPG	Minutes per game
FG%	Field goal percentage	3P%	3-point field goal percentage	FT%	Free throw percentage
RPG	Rebounds per game	APG	Assists per game	SPG	Steals per game
BPG	Blocks per game	PPG	Points per game	**Bold**	Career high

=== College ===
Year	Team	GP	GS	MPG	FG%	3P%	FT%	RPG	APG	SPG	BPG	PPG
2017–18	Ohio	30	0	25.0	.471	.120	.600	4.8	1.8	3.3	0.4	13.5
2018–19	Ohio	36	5	29.1	.491	.232	.615	5.1	4.1	3.1	0.6	17.7
2019–20	Ohio	29	29	30.9	.452	.240	.598	5.4	3.4	3.7	0.6	18.2
2020–21	Ohio	25	22	34.4	.484	.235	.648	6.6	4.0	3.8	0.6	25.1
2021–22	Ohio	29	29	37.3	.462	.297	.565	8.4	3.8	2.9	0.6	22.3
Career		149	85	31.1	.472	.240	.603	6.0	3.4	3.3	0.6	19.1
