= Tricia Cullop =

American basketball player and coach

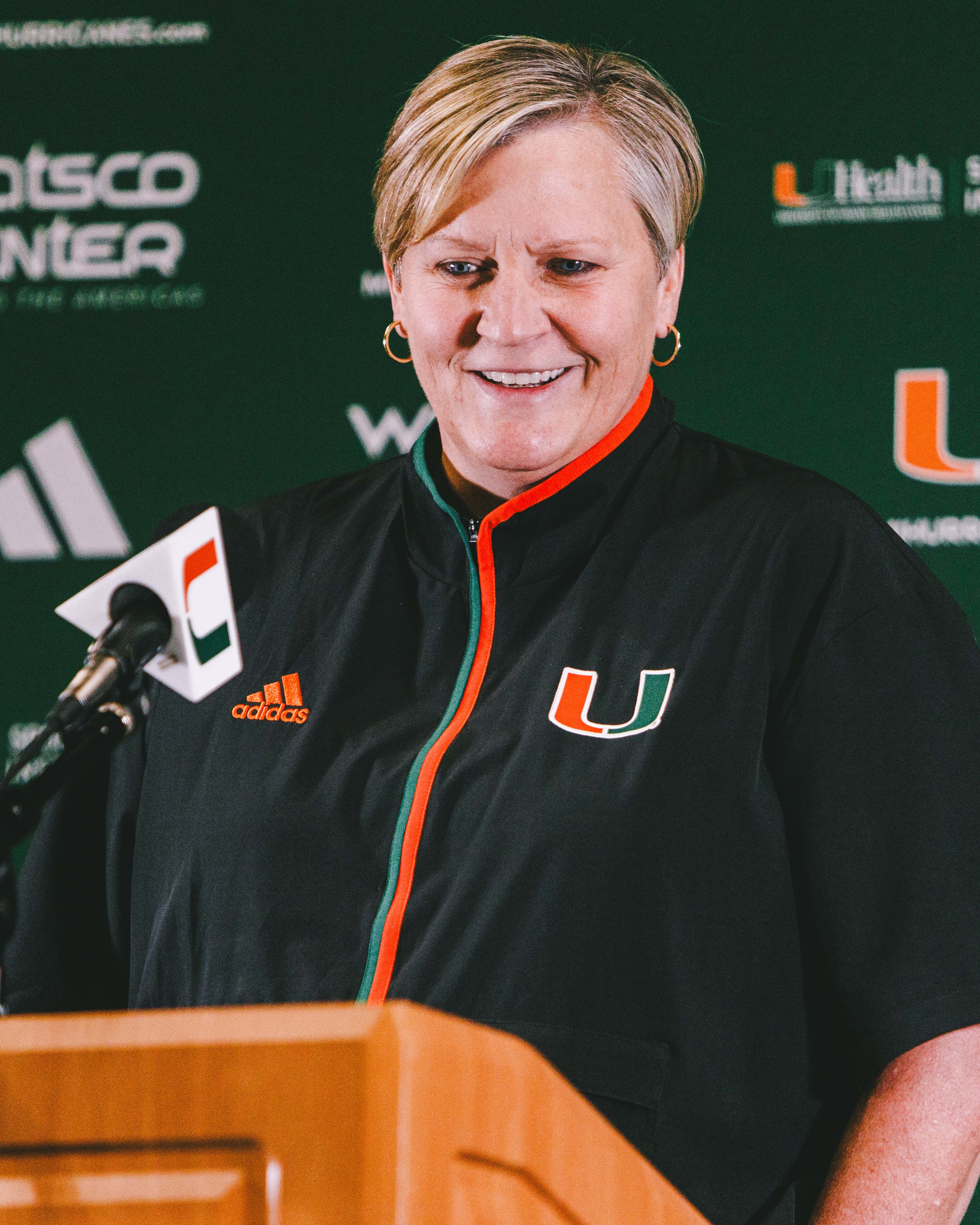
- Tricia Cullop, head Miami women's basketball coach

Current position
- Title: Head coach
- Team: Miami
- Conference: ACC
- Record: 32–30 (.516)

Biographical details
- Born: April 24, 1971 (age 55); Bicknell, Indiana, U.S.

Playing career
- 1989–1993: Purdue

Coaching career (HC unless noted)
- 1993-1994: Radford (asst.)
- 1994–1996: Long Beach State (asst.)
- 1996–2000: Xavier (asst.)
- 2000–2008: Evansville
- 2008–2024: Toledo
- 2024–present: Miami

Head coaching record
- Overall: 508–309 (.622)

Accomplishments and honors

Championships
- WNIT (2011)

Awards
- Carol Eckman Award (2022)

Tricia Cullop (born April 24, 1971) is the current head coach of the Miami Hurricanes women's basketball team. She previously was the head coach with the Toledo Rockets women's basketball team.

== Early life ==
Cullop played basketball at Purdue under head coach Lin Dunn. She was a three-time Academic All-Big Ten. She earned a bachelor's degree in communications from Purdue University in 1993.

== Coaching career ==
Early in her career, she served as an assistant at Radford, Long Beach State, and Xavier.

=== Evansville ===
In 2000, she took over as the head coach at Evansville where she stayed for eight seasons with a 73–48 record. In her final season in 2007–08, the Purple Aces won the Missouri Valley Conference and advanced to the second round of the WNIT. She was the 2008 MVC coach of the year.

=== Toledo ===
On April 18, 2008, she was named head coach at Toledo. Her teams have won five MAC championships in 2011, 2013, 2022, 2023, and 2024. Her 2016–17 and 2022–23 teams won the MAC tournament. The 2017 team qualified for the NCAA tournament where they lost to Creighton in the first round. In 2023, they defeated Iowa State before losing to Tennessee. Her teams have played in the WNIT eight times including taking home the championship in the 2011 Tournament. Her 2024 team advanced to the quarterfinals of the WBIT before losing to Washington State. She was named MAC Coach of the Year in 2009, 2011, 2013, 2022, 2023, and 2024.

=== Miami ===
On April 5, 2024, she was named head coach of Miami, replacing Katie Meier.

== Head coaching record ==
Record table
Season	Team	Overall	Conference	Standing	Postseason
Evansville (Missouri Valley Conference) (2000–2008)
2000–01	Evansville	13–15	8–10	T-5th	
2001–02	Evansville	15–15	9–9	T-4th	
2002–03	Evansville	11–16	5–13	T-8th	
2003–04	Evansville	11–16	6–12	9th	
2004–05	Evansville	17–11	10–8	5th	
2005–06	Evansville	16–13	11–7	4th	
2006–07	Evansville	19–12	11–7	T-4th	
2007–08	Evansville	21–12	13–5	T-1st	WNIT second round
Evansville:		123–110 (.528)	73–71 (.507)		
Toledo (Mid-American Conference) (2008–present)
2008–09	Toledo	18–13	11–5	2nd (West)	
2009–10	Toledo	25–9	12–4	1st (West)	WNIT second round
2010–11	Toledo	29–8	14–2	1st (West)	WNIT Champions
2011–12	Toledo	24–10	13–3	T-1st (West)	WNIT Quarterfinals
2012–13	Toledo	29–4	15–1	1st (West)	WNIT third round
2013–14	Toledo	16–16	9–9	T-2nd (West)	
2014–15	Toledo	19–14	10–8	4th (West)	WNIT second round
2015–16	Toledo	17–13	12–6	T-3rd (West)	
2016–17	Toledo	25–9	12–6	T-3rd (West)	NCAA first round
2017–18	Toledo	18–15	8–10	4th (West)	WNIT second round
2018–19	Toledo	21–12	11–7	2nd (West)	WNIT second round
2019–20	Toledo	14–17	7–11	T–5th (West)	
2020–21	Toledo	12–12	8–12	9th	
2021–22	Toledo	29–6	19–1	1st	WNIT Quarterfinals
2022–23	Toledo	29–5	16–2	1st	NCAA second round
2023–24	Toledo	28–6	17–1	1st	WBIT Quarterfinals
Toledo:		353–169 (.676)	194–88 (.688)		
Miami (FL) (Atlantic Coast Conference) (2024–present)
2024–25	Miami (FL)	14–15	4–14	16th	
2025–26	Miami (FL)	18–15	8–10	T–11th	WBIT Second Round
Miami:		32–30 (.516)	12–24 (.333)		
Total:		508–309 (.622)			
National champion Postseason invitational champion Conference regular season champion Conference regular season and conference tournament champion Division regular season champion Division regular season and conference tournament champion Conference tournament champion
