= 2022–23 Iowa State Cyclones women's basketball team =

American college basketball season

2022–23 Iowa State Cyclones women's basketball

Big 12 tournament champions

NCAA tournament, First Round
- Conference: Big 12 Conference

Ranking
- Coaches: No. 25
- AP: No. 17
- Record: 22–10 (11–7 Big 12)
- Head coach: Bill Fennelly (28th season)
- Assistant coaches: Jodi Steyer; Latoja Schaben; Billy Fennelly
- Home arena: Hilton Coliseum

2022–23 Big 12 Conference women's basketball standings
	Conf.				Overall
Team	W		L	PCT	W		L	PCT
No. 15 Texas	14	–	4	.778	26	–	10	.722
No. 16 Oklahoma	14	–	4	.778	26	–	7	.788
No. 17 Iowa State†	11	–	7	.611	22	–	10	.688
Oklahoma State	10	–	8	.556	21	–	12	.636
West Virginia	10	–	8	.556	19	–	12	.613
Baylor	10	–	8	.556	20	–	13	.606
Kansas	9	–	9	.500	22	–	11	.667
Texas Tech	6	–	12	.333	20	–	15	.571
Kansas State	5	–	13	.278	19	–	16	.543
TCU	1	–	17	.056	8	–	23	.258
† 2023 Big 12 Tournament winner As of March 24, 2023; Rankings from AP poll

The 2022–23 Iowa State Cyclones women's basketball team represented Iowa State University during the 2022–23 NCAA Division I women's basketball season. The Cyclones were coached by Bill Fennelly, who was in his 28th season at Iowa State. They played their home games at Hilton Coliseum in Ames, Iowa as members of the Big 12 Conference.

== Previous season ==
The Cyclones finished the 2021–22 season 28–7, 14–4 in Big 12 play to finish in second place. They defeated West Virginia in the quarterfinals of the Big 12 Tournament before falling to Texas in the semifinals. They received an at-large bid to the 2021 NCAA tournament as a 3rd seed in the Greensboro Region, where they defeated 14 seed UT Arlington in the first round and 6th seed Georgia in the second round, before being upset by 10th seed Creighton in the sweet sixteen.

== Offseason ==
=== Departures ===
Iowa State departures
Name	Number	Pos.	Height	Year	Hometown	Reason for departure
Aubrey Joens	20	G	5'11"	Sophomore	Iowa City, IA	Transferred to Oklahoma
Maddie Frederick	23	G	6'0"	(redshirt) Junior	Tipp, OH	Transferred to Nova Southeastern

=== Incoming ===
Iowa State incoming transfers
Name	Num	Pos.	Height	Year	Hometown	Previous school
Stephanie Soares	10	F	6'6"	(redshirt) Senior	São Paulo, Brazil	The Master's

==== Recruiting ====
There was no incoming recruiting class for 2022.

==== Recruiting class of 2023 ====
College recruiting (2023)
Name	Hometown	School	Height	Weight	Commit date
Addyson Brown; W	Derby, KS	Derby Senior High School	6 ft 2 in (1.88 m)	N/A	
Addyson Brown; W	Recruit ratings: ESPN: (95)				
Jalynn Bristow; F	Wichita Falls, TX	Holliday High School	6 ft 2 in (1.88 m)	N/A	
Jalynn Bristow; F	Recruit ratings: ESPN: (94)				
Audi Crooks; P	Algona, IA	Bishop Garrigan High School	6 ft 3 in (1.91 m)	N/A	
Audi Crooks; P	Recruit ratings: ESPN: (93)				
Arianna Jackson; G	Des Moines, IA	Theodore Roosevelt High School	5 ft 9 in (1.75 m)	N/A	
Arianna Jackson; G	Recruit ratings: No ratings found				
Overall recruit ranking:
Note: In many cases, Scout, Rivals, 247Sports, On3, and ESPN may conflict in their listings of height and weight.; In these cases, the average was taken. ESPN grades are on a 100-point scale.; Sources: "2023 Player Commits". ESPN. Archived from the original on February 7, 2023.

== Roster ==
2022–23 Iowa State Cyclones women's basketball team
Players
Coaches

Pos.	#	Name	Height	Year	Previous school	Hometown
F	1	Nyamer Diew	6 ft 2 in (1.88 m)	Jr	Butler	Marshall, MN
G	3	Denae Fritz	5 ft 11 in (1.8 m)	RS Fr	Maryville	Maryville, TN
G	4	Shantavia Dawkins	5 ft 7 in (1.7 m)	RS Fr	Southwest Academy	Brampton, ON
F/C	10	Stephanie Soares	6 ft 6 in (1.98 m)	RS Sr	The Master's	São Paulo, Brazil
G	11	Emily Ryan	5 ft 11 in (1.8 m)	Jr	Central Plains	Claflin, KS
G	12	Mary Kate King	5 ft 3 in (1.6 m)	So	Wahlert Catholic	Dubuque, IA
G	13	Maggie Espenmiller-McGraw	5 ft 10 in (1.78 m)	Sr	Southeast Polk	Indianola, IA
F	15	Izzi Zingaro	6 ft 4 in (1.93 m)	RS So	Caledon Academy	Bolton, Canada
G	21	Lexi Donarski	6 ft 0 in (1.83 m)	Jr	Aquinas	La Crosse, WI
G	24	Ashley Joens	6 ft 1 in (1.85 m)	GS	Iowa City	Iowa City, IA
C	25	Beatriz Jordão	6 ft 3 in (1.91 m)	GS	South Florida	Pombal, Portugal
F	31	Morgan Kane	6 ft 3 in (1.91 m)	RS Sr	Riverton	West Jordan, UT
F	32	Maggie Vick	6 ft 2 in (1.88 m)	So	Lakeway Christian (TN)	Morristown, TN

Head coach

- Bill Fennelly (William Penn)

Assistant coach(es)

- Jodi Steyer (Colorado State)
- Latoja Schaben (Toledo)
- Billy Fennelly (Iowa State)

Legend

- (C) Team captain
- (S) Suspended
- (I) Ineligible
- (W) Walk-on
- Injured
- Current redshirt

Roster

== Schedule and results ==
Date time, TV	Rank^{#}	Opponent^{#}	Result	Record	High points	High rebounds	High assists	Site (attendance) city, state
Exhibition
November 2, 2022*; 6:30 p.m.	No. 8	Winona State	W 97–40		26 – Soares	10 – Kane	7 – Ryan	Hilton Coliseum (9,253); Ames, IA
Non-conference regular season
November 7, 2022*; 11:00 a.m., ESPN+	No. 8	Cleveland State	W 87–54	1–0	28 – Joens	14 – Soares	5 – Tied	Hilton Coliseum (9,556); Ames, IA
November 10, 2022*; 6:30 p.m., ESPN+	No. 8	Southern	W 79–55	2–0	22 – Donarski	14 – Joens	6 – Ryan	Hilton Coliseum (9,662); Ames, IA
November 16, 2022*; 6:00 p.m., ESPN+	No. 7	at Northern Iowa	W 88–85	3–0	26 – Joens	9 – Joens	6 – Donarski	McLeod Center (2,744); Cedar Falls, IA
November 20, 2022*; 11:00 a.m., ESPN+	No. 7	Columbia	W 99–76	4–0	33 – Joens	10 – Joens	9 – Ryan	Hilton Coliseum (9,451); Ames, IA
November 24, 2022*; 6:30 p.m., ESPNU	No. 5	vs. Michigan State; Phil Knight Invitational semifinals	W 80–49	5–0	23 – Soares	11 – Soares	8 – Ryan	Chiles Center; Portland, OR
November 27, 2022*; 6:30 p.m., ESPN2	No. 5	vs. No. 8 North Carolina; Phil Knight Invitational championship	L 64–73	5–1	19 – Soares	12 – Soares	10 – Ryan	Moda Center; Portland, OR
November 29, 2022*; 6:30 p.m., ESPN+	No. 8	SIU Edwardsville	W 93–43	6–1	22 – Donarski	10 – Soares	7 – Ryan	Hilton Coliseum (9,689); Ames, IA
December 7, 2022*; 6:00 p.m., ESPN2	No. 10	at No. 16 Iowa; Rivalry	L 57–70	6–2	15 – Tied	11 – Soares	4 – Donarski	Carver–Hawkeye Arena (13,802); Iowa City, IA
December 11, 2022*; 12:00 p.m., ESPN+	No. 10	Jacksonville	W 84–50	7–2	22 – Joens	10 – Joens	7 – Ryan	Hilton Coliseum (10,182); Ames, IA
December 18, 2022*; 2:30 p.m., ESPN	No. 14	vs. No. 25 Villanova; Basketball Hall of Fame Women's Showcase	W 74–62	8–2	17 – Joens	11 – Soares	10 – Ryan	Mohegan Sun Arena (7,654); Uncasville, CT
December 22, 2022*; 5:00 p.m., ESPN+	No. 14	Drake	Canceled due to severe weather					Hilton Coliseum; Ames, IA
Big 12 regular season
December 31, 2022; 2:00 p.m., ESPN+	No. 15	at Texas Tech	W 81–58	9–2 (1–0)	22 – Joens	16 – Soares	6 – Ryan	United Supermarkets Arena (5,868); Lubbock, TX
January 4, 2023; 6:30 p.m., ESPN+	No. 11	West Virginia	W 70–50	10–2 (2–0)	19 – Joens	20 – Soares	9 – Ryan	Hilton Coliseum (9,044); Ames, IA
January 8, 2023; 2:00 p.m., ESPN2	No. 11	at No. 17 Oklahoma	L 79–82	10–3 (2–1)	27 – Joens	9 – Joens	8 – Ryan	Lloyd Noble Center (3,349); Norman, OK
January 11, 2023; 6:30 p.m., ESPN+	No. 15	Kansas State	W 67–56	11–3 (3–1)	14 – Tied	11 – Ryan	8 – Ryan	Hilton Coliseum (9,263); Ames, IA
January 15, 2023; 4:00 p.m., ESPN2	No. 15	at Texas	L 53–68	11–4 (3–2)	21 – Joens	6 – Tied	3 – Tied	Moody Center (6,405); Austin, TX
January 18, 2023; 6:30 p.m., ESPN+	No. 18	Oklahoma State	W 69–64	12–4 (4–2)	14 – Ryan	12 – Joens	7 – Ryan	Hilton Coliseum (9,879); Ames, IA
January 21, 2023; 6:30 p.m., ESPN+	No. 18	Kansas	W 64–50	14–4 (6–2)	26 – Joens	15 – Joens	6 – Ryan	Hilton Coliseum (10,677); Ames, IA
January 25, 2023; 6:30 p.m., ESPN+	No. 18	at TCU	W 75–35	13–4 (5–2)	19 – Joens	14 – Joens	7 – Donarski	Schollmaier Arena (2,016); Fort Worth, TX
January 28, 2023; 3:00 p.m., ESPN+	No. 18	No. 14 Oklahoma	W 86–78	15–4 (7–2)	32 – Joens	9 – Kane	8 – Ryan	Hilton Coliseum (11,568); Ames, IA
February 1, 2023; 6:30 p.m., ESPN+	No. 12	Kansas State	L 77–78	15–5 (7–3)	18 – Donarski	14 – Diew	8 – Ryan	Bramlage Coliseum (4,132); Manhattan, KS
February 4, 2023; 4:00 p.m., ESPNU	No. 12	Baylor	L 70–76	15–6 (7–4)	25 – Diew	8 – Ryan	12 – Ryan	Hilton Coliseum (11,788); Ames, IA
February 11, 2023; 5:00 p.m., ESPN+	No. 21	at West Virginia	L 60–73	15–7 (7–5)	17 – Joens	9 – Joens	4 – Ryan	WVU Coliseum (2,587); Morgantown, WV
February 13, 2023; 6:00 p.m., ESPN2	No. 22	No. 17 Texas	W 66–61	16–7 (8–5)	24 – Joens	8 – Joens	8 – Ryan	Hilton Coliseum (10,681); Ames, IA
February 18, 2023; 5:00 p.m., ESPN+	No. 22	at Baylor	W 81–77 ^{2OT}	17–7 (9–5)	27 – Joens	11 – Tied	5 – Ryan	Ferrell Center (5,083); Waco, TX
February 22, 2023; 6:30 p.m., ESPN+	No. 20	at Oklahoma State	L 68–73	17–8 (9–6)	20 – Joens	9 – Joens	3 – Donarski	Gallagher-Iba Arena (2,768); Stillwater, OK
February 25, 2023; 5:00 p.m., ESPN+	No. 20	TCU	W 84–56	18–8 (10–6)	22 – Joens	11 – Joens	4 – Ryan	Hilton Coliseum (11,227); Ames, IA
March 1, 2023; 7:00 p.m., ESPN+	No. 23	at Kansas	L 93–98	18–9 (10–7)	33 – Joens	14 – Joens	10 – Ryan	Allen Fieldhouse (3,053); Lawrence, KS
March 4, 2023; 3:00 p.m., ESPN+	No. 23	Texas Tech	W 76–52	19–9 (11–7)	22 – Joens	11 – Ryan	5 – Ryan	Hilton Coliseum (11,858); Ames, IA
Big 12 Tournament
March 10, 2023; 7:30 p.m., ESPN+	(3)	vs. (6) Baylor; Quarterfinals	W 74–63	20–9	30 – Joens	15 – Joens	8 – Ryan	Municipal Auditorium (4,979); Kansas City, MO
March 11, 2023; 2:30 p.m., ESPN+	(3)	vs. (2) No. 14 Oklahoma; Semifinals	W 82–72	21–9	22 – Joens	8 – Joens	5 – Ryan	Municipal Auditorium (5,937); Kansas City, MO
March 12, 2023; 1:00 p.m., ESPN2	(3)	vs. (1) No. 15 Texas; Final	W 61–51	22–9	28 – Joens	10 – Joens	3 – Joens	Municipal Auditorium (5,045); Kansas City, MO
NCAA Tournament
March 18, 2023*; 2:30 p.m., ESPN2	(5 S3) No. 17	vs. (12 S3) Toledo; First Round	L 73–80	22–10	23 – Joens	13 – Joens	3 – Tied	Thompson–Boling Arena (6,871); Knoxville, TN
*Non-conference game. ^{#}Rankings from AP Poll. (#) Tournament seedings in parentheses. S=Seattle 3. All times are in Central Time.

== Rankings ==
Ranking movements Legend: ██ Increase in ranking ██ Decrease in ranking RV = Received votes
	Week																				
Poll	Pre	1	2	3	4	5	6	7	8	9	10	11	12	13	14	15	16	17	18	19	Final
AP	8	8	7	5	8	10	14	14	15	11	15	18	18	12	21	22	20	23	RV	17	Not released
Coaches	9	9*	8	4	8	8	12	13	14	11	15	17	15	12	19	20	19	23	25	20	25

*Coaches did not release a week 1 poll.

== See also ==
- 2022–23 Iowa State Cyclones men's basketball team
