= Felisha Legette-Jack =

American basketball coach (born 1966)

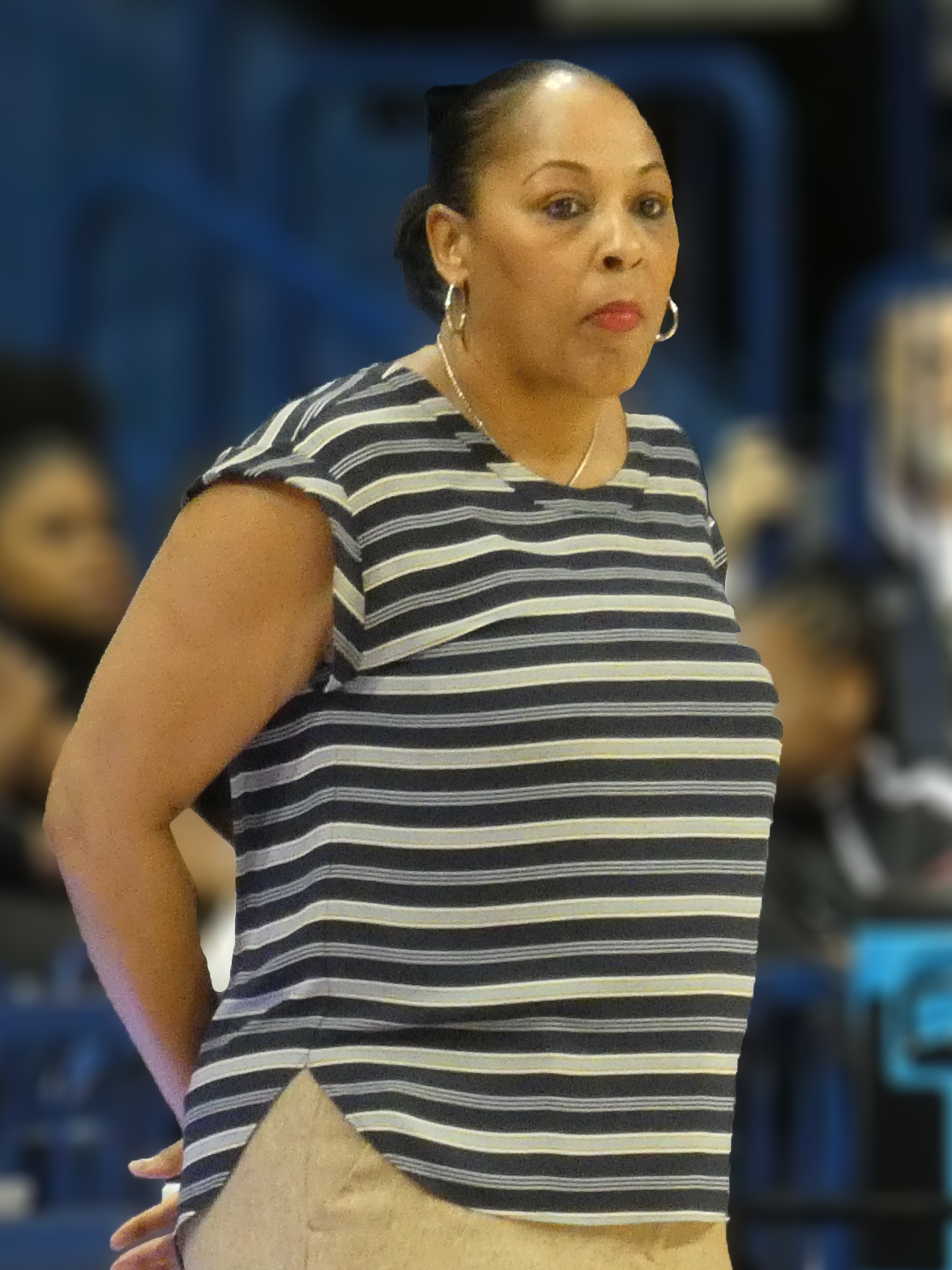
- Legette-Jack in 2020

Current position
- Title: Head coach
- Team: Syracuse
- Conference: ACC
- Record: 80–48 (.625)

Biographical details
- Born: September 4, 1966 (age 60); Syracuse, New York, U.S.

Playing career
- 1984–1989: Syracuse

Coaching career (HC unless noted)
- 1989–1991: Westhill Senior HS
- 1991–1993: Boston College (asst.)
- 1993–2000: Syracuse (asst.)
- 2000–2002: Michigan State (asst.)
- 2002–2006: Hofstra
- 2006–2012: Indiana
- 2012–2022: Buffalo
- 2022–present: Syracuse

Head coaching record
- Overall: 423–327 (.564)
- Tournaments: 4–5 (.444)

Accomplishments and honors

Awards
- ACC Coach of the Year (2024); CAA Coach of the Year (2004); Big East Freshman of the Year (1985)
Medal record
Women's basketball
Assistant coach for United States
FIBA Under-19 World Championship
Gold medal – first place	2005 Tunis	Team competition

Felisha Legette-Jack (born September 4, 1966) is the current head coach of the Syracuse University's women basketball team. She previously served as the head coach at the University at Buffalo, Indiana University, and Hofstra University's women basketball teams.

== Early life and education ==
Coming from an athletically gifted family, Legette-Jack first came to prominence at Nottingham High School, in Syracuse, New York, in the mid 1980s. Her brother, Ronnie, had led the Bulldogs to a state championship earlier, but Felisha went one better, leading the Lady Bulldogs to two state titles before going on to star at Syracuse University. At Syracuse, Legette-Jack scored 1,526 points, grabbed 927 rebounds, and graduated as the all-time leading scorer and rebounder in program history. As of 2021, she ranked fifth in scoring and third in rebounds. She was the 1985 Big East Rookie of the Year, and all-league player three times, and was the recipient of a LetterWinner of Distinction Award.

Legette-Jack was inducted into the Syracuse Hall of Fame in 1998. Syracuse University retired her basketball jersey (#33) in November 2021. She became the first women's basketball player at Syracuse to have her number retired, and one of the first three female athletes to have their uniforms retired by the Orange.

== Coaching career ==
After graduating from Syracuse, Legette-Jack became an assistant coach for the Boston College Eagles women's basketball and then returned to Syracuse in similar role, working under Marianna Freeman from 1993 to 2000.

From 2002 to 2006, she served as the head coach at Hofstra.

=== Indiana University ===
In April 2006, Legette-Jack was hired at Indiana. She was fired by IU Athletic Director Fred Glass on March 12, 2012. She was hired by University at Buffalo Athletic Director Danny White on June 14, 2012, marking White's first coaching hire at UB.

=== University at Buffalo ===
After being hired as the new women's basketball coach at Buffalo, Coach Legette-Jack made significant advances to the program. Under her leadership, Buffalo earned four trips to the NCAA Division I women's basketball tournament, in 2016, 2018, 2019 and 2022. The 2016 tournament appearance was the first in program history. The 2018 appearance culminated in Buffalo's first run to the Sweet Sixteen in program history.

=== USA Basketball ===
Legette-Jack served as an assistant coach of the U19 team representing the US at the 2005 FIBA Americas U19 Championship for Women in Tunis, Tunisia. The USA team won all eight of their games, including the championship game against Serbia & Montenegro. Crystal Langhorne hit 77.5% of her field goal attempts, to lead the USA scorers with over 16 points per game. Candice Wiggins was close behind with almost 16 points per game. The USA team was dominant, winning every game by more than 20 points.

=== Syracuse University ===
On March 26, 2022, Legette-Jack was officially announced as the head coach of Syracuse, marking a return to her alma mater.

== Head coaching record ==
Record table
Season	Team	Overall	Conference	Standing	Postseason
Hofstra Pride (Colonial Athletic Association) (2002–2006)
2002–03	Hofstra	8–21	4–14	9th	
2003–04	Hofstra	14–14	11–7	T–2nd	
2004–05	Hofstra	13–16	7–11	7th	
2005–06	Hofstra	19–12	12–6	4th	WNIT Second Round
Hofstra:		54–63 (.462)	34–38 (.472)		
Indiana Hoosiers (Big Ten Conference) (2006–2012)
2006–07	Indiana	19–14	6–10	T–8th	WNIT Third Round
2007–08	Indiana	18–15	10–8	T–5th	WNIT Second Round
2008–09	Indiana	21–11	11–7	T–5th	WNIT Quarterfinal
2009–10	Indiana	14–16	7–11	T–8th	
2010–11	Indiana	9–20	3–13	10th	
2011–12	Indiana	6–24	1–15	11th	
Indiana:		87–100 (.465)	39–64 (.379)		
Buffalo Bulls (Mid-American Conference) (2012–2022)
2012–13	Buffalo	12–20	8–8	4th (East)	
2013–14	Buffalo	17–13	10–8	3rd (East)	
2014–15	Buffalo	19–13	11–7	3rd (East)	WNIT First Round
2015–16	Buffalo	20–14	8–10	3rd (East)	NCAA First Round
2016–17	Buffalo	22–10	10–8	3rd (East)	
2017–18	Buffalo	29–6	16–2	1st (East)	NCAA Sweet Sixteen
2018–19	Buffalo	24–10	12–6	3rd (East)	NCAA Second Round
2019–20	Buffalo	19–12	9–9	3rd (East)	Post-season canceled due to COVID-19
2020–21	Buffalo	15–9	11–6	4th (East)	
2021–22	Buffalo	25–9	16–4	2nd	NCAA First Round
Buffalo:		202–116 (.635)	111–68 (.620)		
Syracuse Orange (Atlantic Coast Conference) (2022–present)
2022–23	Syracuse	20–13	9–9	9th	WNIT Third Round
2023–24	Syracuse	24–8	13–5	T–2nd	NCAA Second Round
2024–25	Syracuse	12–18	6–12	T-12th	
2025–26	Syracuse	24–9	12–6	T-5th	NCAA Second Round
Syracuse:		80–48 (.625)	40–32 (.556)		
Total:		423–327 (.564)			
National champion Postseason invitational champion Conference regular season champion Conference regular season and conference tournament champion Division regular season champion Division regular season and conference tournament champion Conference tournament champion
