= Toledo Rockets women's basketball =

Women's college basketball team

2026–27 Toledo Rockets women's basketball team
- University: University of Toledo
- Head coach: Ginny Boggess (3rd season)
- Location: Toledo, Ohio
- Arena: Savage Arena (capacity: 7,300)
- Conference: Mid-American
- Nickname: Rockets
- Colors: Midnight blue and gold

NCAA Division I tournament second round
- 1991, 1992, 1996, 2023

NCAA Division I tournament appearances
- 1991, 1992, 1995, 1996, 1997, 1999, 2001, 2017, 2023

Conference tournament champions
- 1991, 1992, 1995, 1996, 1997, 1999, 2001, 2017, 2023

Conference regular-season champions
- 1991, 1992, 1995, 1997, 2022, 2023, 2024

Conference division champions
- MAC West: 1998, 1999, 2001, 2003, 2010, 2011, 2012, 2013

Uniforms
Home	Away

The Toledo Rockets women's basketball is the team that represents The University of Toledo in women's basketball. The school currently competes in the Mid-American Conference in Division I of the National Collegiate Athletic Association (NCAA). The Rockets play home basketball games at Savage Arena which is on the campus in Toledo, Ohio.

== Season-by-season record ==
As of the 2016–17 season, the Rockets have a 832–538 record, with a 441–246 record in the Mid-American Conference. Toledo has won the Mid-American Conference women's basketball tournament nine times (1991, 1992, 1995, 1996, 1997, 1999, 2001, 2017, 2023) while finishing as runner-up in 1984, 1989, 1994, 1998, 2000, and 2010. They reached the Second round of the NCAA tournament in 1992 and 1996. They have made 10 appearances in the Women's National Invitation Tournament, winning the title in 2011 and quarterfinals appearances in 2012 and 2022.

Season	Record	Conference record (finish)	Coach
1974–75	7–4	n/a	Pat Besner
1975–76	2–7	n/a	Pauline Bozzo
1976–77	4–8	n/a	Janet Witker
1977–78	5–9	n/a	Janet Witker
1978–79	3–15	n/a	Janet Witker
1979–80	7–17	n/a	Ethel Allman
1980–81	12–20	n/a	Ethel Allman
1981–82	14–12	3–6 (7th)	Ethel Allman
1982–83	20–8	13–5 (2nd)	Ethel Allman
1983–84	18–11	12–6 (3rd)	Ethel Allman
1984–85	6–20	4–14 (T-9th)	Steve Mix
1985–86	7–21	4–14 (10th	Tim Selgo
1986–87	12–14	6–10 (7th)	Tim Selgo
1987–88	14–14	7–9 (5th)	Tim Selgo
1988–89	25–8	13–3 (2nd)	Bill Fennelly
1989–90	25–7	13–3 (2nd)	Bill Fennelly
1990–91	24–7	13–3 (1st)	Bill Fennelly
1991–92	26–6	15–1 (1st)	Bill Fennelly
1992–93	18–10	12–6 (T-3rd)	Bill Fennelly
1993–94	24–8	13–5 (2nd)	Bill Fennelly
1994–95	24–7	15–3 (1st)	Bill Fennelly
1995–96	25–6	15–3 (2nd)	Mark Ehlen
1996–97	27–4	16–2 (1st)	Mark Ehlen
1997–98	24–7	15–3 (1st in West)	Mark Ehlen
1998–99	25–6	14–2 (1st in West)	Mark Ehlen
1999-00	14–15	9–7 (2nd in West)	Mark Ehlen
2000–01	25–6	15–1 (1st in West)	Mark Ehlen
2001–02	17–11	12–4 (2nd in West)	Mark Ehlen
2002–03	20–10	12–4 (T-1st in West)	Mark Ehlen
2003–04	13–16	8–8 (4th in West)	Mark Ehlen
2004–05	14–15	9–7 (4th in West)	Mark Ehlen
2005–06	11–18	4–12 (6th in West)	Mark Ehlen
2006–07	11–19	6–10 (T-4th in West)	Mark Ehlen
2007–08	14–16	5–10 (5th in West)	Mark Ehlen
2008–09	18–13	11–5 (2nd in West)	Tricia Cullop
2009–10	25–9	12–4 (1st in West)	Tricia Cullop
2010–11	29–8	14–2 (1st in West)	Tricia Cullop
2011–12	24–10	13–3 (T-1st in West)	Tricia Cullop
2012–13	29–4	15–1 (1st in West)	Tricia Cullop
2013–14	16–16	9–9 (T-2nd in West)	Tricia Cullop
2014–15	19–14	10–8 (4th in West)	Tricia Cullop
2015–16	17–13	12–6 (3rd in West)	Tricia Cullop
2016–17	25–9	12–6 (3rd in West)	Tricia Cullop
2017–18	18–15	8–10 (4th in West)	Tricia Cullop
2018–19	21–12	11–7 (2nd in West)	Tricia Cullop
2019–20	14–17	7–11 (T–5th in West)	Tricia Cullop
2020–21	12–12	8–12 (9th)	Tricia Cullop
2021–22	29–6	19–1 (1st)	Tricia Cullop
2022–23	29–5	16–2 (1st)	Tricia Cullop
2023–24	28–6	17–1 (1st)	Tricia Cullop
2024–25	24–9	13–5 (T–2nd)	Ginny Boggess

== Postseason results ==
=== NCAA tournament results ===
The Rockets have made nine appearances in the NCAA Division I women's basketball tournament. Their combined record is 4–9.

Year	Seed	Round	Opponent	Result
1991	#11	First Round; Second Round	#6 Rutgers #3 Connecticut	W 83–65; L 81–80
1992	#10	First Round; Second Round	#7 Providence #2 Maryland	W 74–64; L 73–60
1995	#13	First Round	#4 Western Kentucky	L 77–63
1996	#10	First Round; Second Round	#7 Ole Miss #2 Old Dominion	W 65–53; L 72–66
1997	#10	First Round	#7 Stephen F. Austin	L 79–66
1999	#6	First Round	#11 SMU	L 91–76
2001	#12	First Round	#5 SW Missouri State	L 89–71
2017	#10	First Round	#7 Creighton	L 76–49
2023	#12	First Round; Second Round	#5 Iowa State #4 Tennessee	W 80–73; L 47–94

=== WNIT results ===
The Rockets have made ninth appearances in the Women's National Invitation Tournament (WNIT). Their combined record is 19–8. They won the 2011 Tournament.

Year	Round	Opponent	Results
1998	First Round; Second Round	Cincinnati; Indiana	W 76–62; L 60–61
2010	First Round; Second Round	Pittsburgh; Michigan	W 70–58; L 57–72
2011	First Round; Second Round; Regional Semifinals; Regional Finals; Semifinals; Championship Game	Delaware; Auburn; Alabama; Syracuse; Charlotte; USC	W 58–55; W 67–52; W 74–59; W 71–68^{OT} W 83–60; W 76–68
2012	First Round; Second Round; Third Round; Quarterfinals	Detroit; Cincinnati; VCU; Syracuse	W 59–49; W 74–51; W 81–64; L 73–74^{OT}
2013	First Round; Second Round; Third Round	Butler; Youngstown State; Illinois	W 63–49; W 61–43; L 55–63
2015	First Round; Second Round	Wright State; Michigan	W 72–64; L 58–74
2018	First Round; Second Round	Wright State; Michigan State	W 64–50; L 66–68
2019	First Round; Second Round	Seton Hall; Northwestern	W 71–65; L 47–54
2022	First Round; Second Round; Third Round; Quarterfinals	Houston Baptist; Kent State; Marquette; Middle Tennessee	W 61–51; W 79–59; W 92–82; L 71–73^{OT}

=== WBIT results ===
The Rockets have made two appearances in the Women's Basketball Invitation Tournament (WBIT). Their combined record is 2–2.

Year	Round	Opponent	Results
2024	First Round; Second Round; Quarterfinals	Cleveland State; St. John's; Washington State	W 76–68; W 72–71; L 61–63
2025	First Round	Minnesota	L 53–65
