= 2023–24 Marshall Thundering Herd women's basketball team =

American college basketball season

2023–24 Marshall Thundering Herd women's basketball

Sun Belt regular season and tournament champions

NCAA tournament, first round
- Conference: Sun Belt Conference
- Record: 26–7 (17–1 Sun Belt)
- Head coach: Kim Caldwell (1st season)
- Assistant coaches: Jenna Burdette; Daniel Price; Angel Rizor; Mashayla Cecil
- Home arena: Cam Henderson Center

2023–24 Sun Belt Conference women's basketball standings
	Conf.				Overall
Team	W		L	PCT	W		L	PCT
Marshall †	17	–	1	.944	26	–	7	.788
Troy	15	–	3	.833	22	–	12	.647
James Madison	13	–	5	.722	23	–	12	.657
Old Dominion	12	–	6	.667	22	–	10	.688
Louisiana–Monroe	10	–	8	.556	21	–	14	.600
Southern Miss	10	–	8	.556	20	–	14	.588
Louisiana	10	–	8	.556	17	–	14	.548
Appalachian State	9	–	9	.500	17	–	15	.531
Georgia State	9	–	9	.500	15	–	15	.500
Arkansas State	6	–	12	.333	13	–	17	.433
Coastal Carolina	5	–	13	.278	12	–	21	.364
Georgia Southern	4	–	14	.222	15	–	18	.455
Texas State	4	–	14	.222	14	–	18	.438
South Alabama	2	–	16	.111	9	–	23	.281
† 2024 Sun Belt tournament winner

The 2023–24 Marshall Thundering Herd women's basketball team represented Marshall University during the 2023–24 NCAA Division I women's basketball season. The Thundering Herd, led by first-year head coach Kim Caldwell, played their home games at Cam Henderson Center in Huntington, West Virginia as members of the Sun Belt Conference. They finished the season 26–7, 17–1 in Sun Belt play, to finish in first place. In the Sun Belt tournament, they defeated Appalachian State, Old Dominion and James Madison to become champions. They received the Sun Belt's automatic bid to the NCAA tournament where, as a No. 13 seed, they lost to No. 4 seed Virginia Tech in the first round.

After the season, head coach Kim Caldwell left to become the head coach at Tennessee. Marshall hired Transylvania University head coach Juli Fulks as her replacement.

== Previous season ==
In their 2022–23 season, the Thundering Herd finished eighth-ranked in conference play with a record of 17–14 overall and 9–9 in conference play. They lost to James Madison in the conference tournament quarterfinals and did not advance to postseason play.

On March 27, former Glenville State head coach Kim Caldwell was hired to coach the Thundering Herd.

== Roster ==
2023–24 Marshall Thundering Herd women's basketball team
Players
Coaches

Pos.	#	Name	Height	Year	Previous school	Hometown
G/F	0	Timberlynn Yeast	5 ft 9 in (1.75 m)	Fr	Mercer County	Harrodsburg, KY
G	1	Breanna Campbell	5 ft 5 in (1.65 m)	Sr	Glenville State	Largo, FL
G	3	CC Mays	5 ft 8 in (1.73 m)	So	Seffner Christian	Tampa, FL
G	4	Abby Beeman	5 ft 4 in (1.63 m)	GS	Shepherd	Ridgeley, WV
G	5	Alasia Hayes	5 ft 8 in (1.73 m)	RS So	Mississippi State	Murfreesboro, TN
G	10	Aislynn Hayes	5 ft 8 in (1.73 m)	Jr	Mississippi State	Murfreesboro, TN
G/F	11	Jayda Allie	5 ft 8 in (1.73 m)	Fr	Cabell Midland	Huntington, WV
F	14	Olivia Ziolkowski	6 ft 0 in (1.83 m)	So	Woodrow Wilson	Beckley, WV
G	15	Sydni Scott	5 ft 8 in (1.73 m)	So	Cardinal O'Hara	Prospect Park, PA
G	20	Peyton Ilderton	5 ft 6 in (1.68 m)	So	Logan	Logan, WV
G	21	Terah Harness	5 ft 9 in (1.75 m)	Jr	USC Upstate	New Carlisle, OH
G	22	Ashley Tudor	5 ft 11 in (1.8 m)	Jr	Radford	Cincinnati, OH
F	23	Meredith Maier	6 ft 0 in (1.83 m)	So	Fairmont Senior	Fairmont, WV
F	25	Mahogany Matthews	6 ft 1 in (1.85 m)	RS Sr	Ole Miss	York, PA
G/F	30	Aarionna Redman	5 ft 10 in (1.78 m)	Jr	Pickerington Central	Pickerington, OH
F	87	Tamia Lawhorne	6 ft 0 in (1.83 m)	GS	George Mason	Amityville, NY

Head coach

- Kim Caldwell (Glenville State)

Assistant coach(es)

- Jenna Burdette (Dayton)
- Daniel Price (Pikeville)
- Angel Rizor (Cincinnati)
- Mashayla Cecil (Glenville State)

Legend

- (C) Team captain
- (S) Suspended
- (I) Ineligible
- (W) Walk-on
- Injured
- Current redshirt

Roster
Last update: August 4, 2024

== Schedule and results ==
Date time, TV	Rank^{#}	Opponent^{#}	Result	Record	Site (attendance) city, state
Exhibition
October 29, 2023*; 6:30 p.m.		Pikeville	W 127–76		Cam Henderson Center; Huntington, WV
Non-conference regular season
November 9, 2023*; 7:00 p.m., ESPN+		at George Mason	L 77–84	0–1	EagleBank Arena (706); Fairfax, VA
November 12, 2023*; 2:00 p.m., ESPN+		at Chattanooga	W 79–74	1–1	McKenzie Arena (1,283); Chattanooga, TN
November 18, 2023*; 2:00 p.m., ESPN+		at Northern Kentucky	L 66–76	1–2	Truist Arena (1,194); Highland Heights, KY
November 20, 2023*; 6:00 p.m., ESPN+		Point Park	W 121–55	2–2	Cam Henderson Center (1,147); Huntington, WV
November 27, 2023*; 7:00 p.m., ESPN+		at Wright State	L 78–89	2–3	Nutter Center (1,157); Fairborn, OH
November 30, 2023*; 6:00 p.m., ESPN+		at Morehead State	L 64–67	2–4	Ellis Johnson Arena (585); Morehead, KY
December 2, 2023*; 1:00 p.m., ESPN+		Florida	W 91–88	3–4	Cam Henderson Center (1,186); Huntington, WV
December 11, 2023*; 6:00 p.m., ESPN+		Salem	W 115–56	4–4	Cam Henderson Center (932); Huntington, WV
December 15, 2023*; 6:30 p.m., ESPN+		at Jacksonville	W 102–77	5–4	Swisher Gymnasium (215); Jacksonville, FL
December 17, 2023*; 1:00 p.m., FloHoops		at Elon	W 84–77	6–4	Schar Center (594); Elon, NC
December 21, 2023*; 12:00 p.m., ACCNX		at Wake Forest	L 59–66	6–5	LJVM Coliseum (941); Winston-Salem, NC
Sun Belt regular season
December 30, 2023; 3:00 p.m., ESPN+		at Southern Miss	W 87–72	7–5 (1–0)	Reed Green Coliseum (1,538); Hattiesburg, MS
January 4, 2024; 6:00 p.m., ESPN+		South Alabama	W 90–64	8–5 (2–0)	Cam Henderson Center (999); Huntington, WV
January 6, 2024; 1:00 p.m., ESPN+		Arkansas State	W 68–51	9–5 (3–0)	Cam Henderson Center (1,288); Huntington, WV
January 11, 2024; 11:00 a.m., ESPN+		at Georgia State	W 90–78	10–5 (4–0)	GSU Convocation Center (1,329); Atlanta, GA
January 13, 2024; 1:00 p.m., ESPN+		at Coastal Carolina	W 72–60	11–5 (5–0)	HTC Center (859); Conway, SC
January 18, 2024; 6:00 p.m., ESPN+		Old Dominion	W 90–60	12–5 (6–0)	Cam Henderson Center (1,098); Huntington, WV
January 20, 2024; 1:00 p.m., ESPN+		Coastal Carolina	W 97–85	13–5 (7–0)	Cam Henderson Center (2,219); Huntington, WV
January 24, 2024; 7:00 p.m., ESPN+		at James Madison	W 77–70	14–5 (8–0)	Atlantic Union Bank Center (2,370); Harrisonburg, VA
January 27, 2024; 2:00 p.m., ESPN+		at Georgia Southern	W 106–95	15–5 (9–0)	Hanner Fieldhouse (763); Statesboro, GA
January 31, 2024; 6:00 p.m., ESPN+		Appalachian State	W 81–69	16–5 (10–0)	Cam Henderson Center (2,095); Huntington, WV
February 3, 2024; 1:00 p.m., ESPN+		James Madison	L 63–72	16–6 (10–1)	Cam Henderson Center (2,526); Huntington, WV
February 7, 2024; 11:00 a.m., ESPN+		Louisiana	W 74–42	17–6 (11–1)	Cam Henderson Center (3,024); Huntington, WV
February 15, 2024; 12:00 p.m., ESPN+		at Appalachian State	W 87–78	18–6 (12–1)	Holmes Center (1,179); Boone, NC
February 17, 2024; 2:00 p.m., ESPN+		at Old Dominion	W 89–75	19–6 (13–1)	Chartway Arena (2,556); Norfolk, VA
February 21, 2024; 8:00 p.m., ESPN+		at Texas State	W 85–59	20–6 (14–1)	Strahan Arena (1,064); San Marcos, TX
February 24, 2024; 1:00 p.m., ESPN+		at Louisiana–Monroe	W 99–90	21–6 (15–1)	Fant–Ewing Coliseum (1,201); Monroe, LA
February 27, 2024; 6:00 p.m., ESPN+		Georgia State	W 97–69	22–6 (16–1)	Cam Henderson Center (2,554); Huntington, WV
March 1, 2024; 6:00 p.m., ESPN+		Georgia Southern	W 90–43	23–6 (17–1)	Cam Henderson Center (2,791); Huntington, WV
Sun Belt tournament
March 8, 2024; 12:30 p.m., ESPN+	(1)	vs. (9) Appalachian State; Quarterfinals	W 116–74	24–6	Pensacola Bay Center (690); Pensacola, FL
March 10, 2024; 12:30 p.m., ESPN+	(1)	vs. (4) Old Dominion; Semifinals	W 76–70	25–6	Pensacola Bay Center (754); Pensacola, FL
March 11, 2024; 2:00 p.m., ESPNU	(1)	vs. (3) James Madison; Championship	W 95–92 ^{OT}	26–6	Pensacola Bay Center (785); Pensacola, FL
NCAA tournament
March 22, 2024*; 3:30 p.m., ESPN2	(13 P3)	at (4 P3) No. 13 Virginia Tech; First round	L 49–92	26–7	Cassell Coliseum (8,925); Blacksburg, VA
*Non-conference game. ^{#}Rankings from AP poll. (#) Tournament seedings in parentheses. P3=Portland 3. All times are in Eastern.

== See also ==
- 2023–24 Marshall Thundering Herd men's basketball team
