= 2023–24 Appalachian State Mountaineers women's basketball team =

Intercollegiate basketball season

2023–24 Appalachian State Mountaineers women's basketball
- Conference: Sun Belt Conference
- Record: 17–15 (9–9 Sun Belt)
- Head coach: Angel Elderkin (10th season)
- Assistant coaches: Jazz Weaver; Alex Frazier; Evan Turkish
- Home arena: Holmes Center

2023–24 Sun Belt Conference women's basketball standings
	Conf.				Overall
Team	W		L	PCT	W		L	PCT
Marshall †	17	–	1	.944	26	–	7	.788
Troy	15	–	3	.833	22	–	12	.647
James Madison	13	–	5	.722	23	–	12	.657
Old Dominion	12	–	6	.667	22	–	10	.688
Louisiana–Monroe	10	–	8	.556	21	–	14	.600
Southern Miss	10	–	8	.556	20	–	14	.588
Louisiana	10	–	8	.556	17	–	14	.548
Appalachian State	9	–	9	.500	17	–	15	.531
Georgia State	9	–	9	.500	15	–	15	.500
Arkansas State	6	–	12	.333	13	–	17	.433
Coastal Carolina	5	–	13	.278	12	–	21	.364
Georgia Southern	4	–	14	.222	15	–	18	.455
Texas State	4	–	14	.222	14	–	18	.438
South Alabama	2	–	16	.111	9	–	23	.281
† 2024 Sun Belt tournament winner

The 2023–24 Appalachian State Mountaineers women's basketball team represented Appalachian State University during the 2023–24 NCAA Division I women's basketball season. The basketball team, led by tenth-year head coach Angel Elderkin, played all home games at the Holmes Center along with the Appalachian State Mountaineers men's basketball team. They were members of the Sun Belt Conference.

== Roster ==
2023–24 Appalachian State Mountaineers women's basketball team
Players
Coaches

Pos.	#	Name	Height	Year	Previous school	Hometown
G	0	Alexis Black	5 ft 9 in (1.75 m)	So	Word of Life Christian Academy	Washington, D.C.
G	1	Mariah Frazier	6 ft 0 in (1.83 m)	Sr	Dudley HS	Whitsett, North Carolina
G	2	Tate Chappell	5 ft 11 in (1.8 m)	Fr	Bishop McGuinness HS	Reidsville, North Carolina
G	3	Taylor Lewis	5 ft 10 in (1.78 m)	Sr	Spring Valley HS; Middle Tennessee	Columbia, South Carolina
G	4	J'Mani Ingram	5 ft 7 in (1.7 m)	Jr	North Augusta HS; Pearl River CC	North Augusta, South Carolina
G	5	Chaé Harris	5 ft 8 in (1.73 m)	So	Shiloh HS	Snellville, Georgia
G	10	Emily Carver	5 ft 10 in (1.78 m)	Jr	Enka HS	Asheville, North Carolina
G	11	Faith Alston	5 ft 7 in (1.7 m)	Sr	Paul VI Catholic HS	Centerville, Virginia
G	12	Zada Porter	5 ft 9 in (1.75 m)	Jr	Cave Spring HS	Roanoke, Virginia
F	14	Nadiyah Byard	6 ft 0 in (1.83 m)	So	Griffin HS	Griffin, Georgia
F	15	Rylan Moffitt	6 ft 0 in (1.83 m)	So	Wekiva HS; Daytona State	Bushnell, Florida
G	20	MaKenzie Drout	—	Fr	Kimberly HS	Kimberly, Wisconsin
F	23	Samantha LaFon	6 ft 0 in (1.83 m)	Jr	Ironton HS; Marshall	Chesapeake, Ohio
F	24	Lexi Bugajski	6 ft 0 in (1.83 m)	Fr	New Berlin Eisenhower HS	New Berlin, Wisconsin
G	33	Lexi Grant	5 ft 9 in (1.75 m)	So	First Baptist HS	Charleston, South Carolina

Head coach

- Angel Elderkin (Southern Maine)

Assistant coach(es)

- Jazz Weaver (UNC Greensboro)
- Alex Frazier (East Carolina)
- Evan Turkish (American)

Legend

- (C) Team captain
- (S) Suspended
- (I) Ineligible
- (W) Walk-on
- Injured
- Current redshirt

Roster
Last update: 26 December 2023

== Schedule and results ==
Date time, TV	Rank^{#}	Opponent^{#}	Result	Record	Site city, state
Non-conference regular season
November 6, 2023*; 6:30 p.m., ESPN+		UNC Greensboro	W 71–65	1–0	Holmes Center (669); Boone, NC
November 11, 2023*; 2:00 p.m., ESPN+		Ohio; SBC-MAC Challenge	W 71–64	2–0	Holmes Center (575); Boone, NC
November 16, 2023*; 11:00 a.m.		at Norfolk State	L 53–67	2–1	Echols Memorial Hall (2,157); Norfolk, VA
November 23, 2023*; 1:30 p.m.		vs. Furman; Thanksgiving Basketball Clasico	W 68–63	3–1	Coliseo Rubén Rodríguez (100); Bayamón, Puerto Rico
November 24, 2023*; 1:30 p.m.		vs. Binghamton; Thanksgiving Basketball Clasico	W 68–57	4–1	Coliseo Rubén Rodríguez (100); Bayamón, Puerto Rico
November 29, 2023*; 7:00 p.m., ESPN+		at Davidson	L 41–64	4–2	Belk Arena (378); Davidson, NC
December 5, 2023*; 5:30 p.m., ESPN+		Charleston	W 77–73	5–2	Holmes Center (318); Boone, NC
December 10, 2023*; 2:00 p.m., ESPN+		at Richmond	L 77–80 ^{OT}	5–3	Robins Center (1,395); Richmond, VA
December 15, 2023*; 8:00 p.m., ESPN+		at Gardner–Webb	L 78–82	5–4	Paul Porter Arena (117); Boiling Springs, NC
December 17, 2023*; 3:00 p.m.		at No. 19 Marquette	L 91–99	5–5	Al McGuire Center (1,915); Milwaukee, WI
December 21, 2023*; 12:00 p.m., ESPN+		Mercer	W 81–78	6–5	Holmes Center (196); Boone, NC
Sun Belt regular season
December 30, 2023; 2:00 p.m., ESPN+		at Louisiana	W 69–56	7–5 (1–0)	Cajundome (862); Lafayette, LA
January 4, 2024; 6:30 p.m., ESPN+		Texas State	L 58–67	7–6 (1–1)	Holmes Center (363); Boone, NC
January 6, 2024; 2:00 p.m., ESPN+		South Alabama	W 96–49	8–6 (2–1)	Holmes Center (362); Boone, NC
January 11, 2024; 6:00 p.m., ESPN+		at Georgia Southern	L 77–83	8–7 (2–2)	Hanner Fieldhouse (812); Statesboro, GA
January 13, 2024; 2:00 p.m., ESPN+		at Georgia State	L 68–73	8–8 (2–3)	GSU Convocation Center (1,075); Atlanta, GA
January 18, 2024; 6:30 p.m., ESPN+		Coastal Carolina	W 73–63	9–8 (3–3)	Holmes Center (467); Boone, NC
January 20, 2024; 2:00 p.m., ESPN+		Georgia Southern	W 82–74	10–8 (4–3)	Holmes Center (370); Boone, NC
January 25, 2024; 6:30 p.m., ESPN+		at Old Dominion	L 49–68	10–9 (4–4)	Chartway Arena (2,189); Norfolk, VA
January 27, 2024; 4:00 p.m., ESPN+		at James Madison	L 61–78	10–10 (4–5)	Atlantic Union Bank Center (4,080); Harrisonburg, VA
January 31, 2024; 6:00 p.m., ESPN+		at Marshall	L 69–81	10–11 (4–6)	Cam Henderson Center (2,095); Huntington, WV
February 3, 2024; 1:00 p.m., ESPN+		at Coastal Carolina	W 80–70	11–11 (5–6)	HTC Center (670); Conway, SC
February 7, 2024; 6:30 p.m., ESPN+		Louisiana–Monroe	W 78–71	12–11 (6–6)	Holmes Center; Boone, NC
February 10, 2024*; 2:00 p.m., ESPN+		at Western Michigan; SBC-MAC Challenge	W 78–68	13–11	University Arena (984); Kalamazoo, MI
February 15, 2024; 12:00 p.m., ESPN+		Marshall	L 78–87	13–12 (6–7)	Holmes Center (1,179); Boone, NC
February 17, 2024; 2:00 p.m., ESPN+		Georgia State	W 93–67	14–12 (7–7)	Holmes Center (457); Boone, NC
February 22, 2024; 6:30 p.m., ESPN+		Old Dominion	L 62–81	14–13 (7–8)	Holmes Center (332); Boone, NC
February 24, 2024; 2:00 p.m., ESPN+		James Madison	W 83–79	15–13 (8–8)	Holmes Center (600); Boone, NC
February 28, 2024; 7:00 p.m., ESPN+		at Troy	L 69–102	15–14 (8–9)	Trojan Arena (2,574); Troy, AL
March 1, 2024; 8:00 p.m., ESPN+		at Arkansas State	W 64–57	16–14 (9–9)	First National Bank Arena (957); Jonesboro, AR
Sun Belt tournament
March 6, 2024; 12:30 p.m., ESPN+	(9)	vs. (8) Georgia State; Second Round	W 73–68	17–14	Pensacola Bay Center (410); Pensacola, FL
March 8, 2024; 12:30 p.m., ESPN+	(9)	vs. (1) Marshall; Quarterfinals	L 74–116	17–15	Pensacola Bay Center (690); Pensacola, FL
*Non-conference game. ^{#}Rankings from AP Poll. (#) Tournament seedings in parentheses. All times are in Eastern Time.

== See also ==
- 2023–24 Appalachian State Mountaineers men's basketball team
