= 2024 Sun Belt Conference women's basketball tournament =

- Classification: Division I
- Season: 2023–24
- Teams: 14
- Site: Pensacola Bay Center; Pensacola, Florida
- Champions: Marshall (1st title)
- Winning coach: Kim Caldwell (1st title)
- MVP: Abby Beeman (Marshall)
- Television: ESPN+, ESPNU

2023–24 Sun Belt Conference women's basketball standings
	Conf.				Overall
Team	W		L	PCT	W		L	PCT
Marshall †	17	–	1	.944	26	–	7	.788
Troy	15	–	3	.833	22	–	12	.647
James Madison	13	–	5	.722	23	–	12	.657
Old Dominion	12	–	6	.667	22	–	10	.688
Louisiana–Monroe	10	–	8	.556	21	–	14	.600
Southern Miss	10	–	8	.556	20	–	14	.588
Louisiana	10	–	8	.556	17	–	14	.548
Appalachian State	9	–	9	.500	17	–	15	.531
Georgia State	9	–	9	.500	15	–	15	.500
Arkansas State	6	–	12	.333	13	–	17	.433
Coastal Carolina	5	–	13	.278	12	–	21	.364
Georgia Southern	4	–	14	.222	15	–	18	.455
Texas State	4	–	14	.222	14	–	18	.438
South Alabama	2	–	16	.111	9	–	23	.281
† 2024 Sun Belt tournament winner

The 2024 Sun Belt Conference women's basketball tournament was the postseason women's basketball tournament for the Sun Belt Conference during the 2023–24 NCAA Division I women's basketball season. All tournament games were played at Pensacola Bay Center between March 5–11. The winner, Marshall, received the Sun Belt's automatic bid to the 2024 NCAA tournament.

== Seeds ==
All 14 conference teams qualified for the tournament. The top four teams received a double-bye into the quarterfinals and the top ten a bye into the second round.

Seed	School	Conference	Tiebreaker
1	Marshall	17–1	
2	Troy	15–3	
3	James Madison	13–5	
4	Old Dominion	12–6	
5	Louisiana–Monroe	10–8	3–1 against Southern Miss/Louisiana
6	Louisiana	10–8	2–2 against Southern Miss/Louisiana–Monroe
7	Southern Miss	10–8	1–3 against Louisiana–Monroe/Louisiana
8	Georgia State	9–9	1–1 vs. Appalachian State; 0–2 vs. Marshall; 1–0 vs. Troy
9	Appalachian State	9–9	1–1 vs. Georgia State; 0–2 vs. Marshall; 0–1 vs. Troy
10	Arkansas State	6–12	
11	Coastal Carolina	5–13	
12	Georgia Southern	4–12	1–0 against Texas State
13	Texas State	4–12	0–1 against Georgia Southern
14	South Alabama	2–16	

== Schedule ==
Game	Time	Matchup	Score	Television
First round – Tuesday, March 5
1	11:30 am	No. 12 Georgia Southern vs. No. 13 Texas State	72–70	ESPN+
2	2:00 pm	No. 11 Coastal Carolina vs. No. 14 South Alabama	79–60	ESPN+
Second round – Wednesday, March 6
3	11:30 am	No. 8 Georgia State vs. No. 9 Appalachian State	73–68	ESPN+
4	2:00 pm	No. 5 Louisiana–Monroe vs. No. 12 Georgia Southern	78–57	ESPN+
5	5:00 pm	No. 6 Southern Miss vs. No. 11 Coastal Carolina	70–53	ESPN+
6	7:30 pm	No. 7 Louisiana vs. No. 10 Arkansas State	54–41	ESPN+
Quarterfinals – Friday, March 8
7	11:30 am	No. 1 Marshall vs. No. 9 Appalachian State	116–74	ESPN+
8	2:00 pm	No. 4 Old Dominion vs. No. 5 Louisiana–Monroe	67–64	ESPN+
9	5:00 pm	No. 3 James Madison vs. No. 6 Southern Miss	77–49	ESPN+
10	7:30 pm	No. 2 Troy vs. No 7. Louisiana	67–65	ESPN+
Semifinals – Sunday, March 10
11	11:30 am	No. 1 Marshall vs. No. 4 Old Dominion	76–70	ESPN+
12	2:00 pm	No. 3 James Madison vs. No. 7 Louisiana	64–54	ESPN+
Championship – Monday, March 11
13	1:00 pm	No. 1 Marshall vs. No. 3 James Madison	95–92^{OT}	ESPNU
Game times in CT. Rankings denote tournament seed

== Bracket ==
First round Tuesday, March 5 ESPN+
12	Georgia Southern	72
13	Texas State	70
11	Coastal Carolina	79
14	South Alabama	60

Second round Wednesday, March 6 ESPN+
8	Georgia State	68
9	Appalachian State	73
5	Louisiana–Monroe	78
12	Georgia Southern	57
7	Louisiana	54
10	Arkansas State	41
6	Southern Miss	70
11	Coastal Carolina	53

Quarterfinals; Friday, March 8 ESPN+
1	Marshall	116
9	Appalachian State	74
4	Old Dominion	67
5	Louisiana-Monroe	64
2	Troy	65
7	Louisiana	67
3	James Madison	77
6	Southern Miss	49

Semifinals; Sunday, March 10; ESPN+
1	Marshall	76
4	Old Dominion	70
7	Louisiana	54
3	James Madison	64

Championship; Monday, March 11; ESPNU
1	Marshall	95*
3	James Madison	92

- =denotes overtime period.

== See also ==
2024 Sun Belt Conference men's basketball tournament
