= 2023–24 South Alabama Jaguars women's basketball team =

Intercollegiate basketball season

2023–24 South Alabama Jaguars women's basketball
- Conference: Sun Belt Conference
- Record: 9–23 (2–16 Sun Belt)
- Head coach: Yolisha Jackson (1st season)
- Assistant coaches: Eryc Pittman; Colby Davis; Brooke LeMar
- Home arena: Mitchell Center

2023–24 Sun Belt Conference women's basketball standings
	Conf.				Overall
Team	W		L	PCT	W		L	PCT
Marshall †	17	–	1	.944	26	–	7	.788
Troy	15	–	3	.833	22	–	12	.647
James Madison	13	–	5	.722	23	–	12	.657
Old Dominion	12	–	6	.667	22	–	10	.688
Louisiana–Monroe	10	–	8	.556	21	–	14	.600
Southern Miss	10	–	8	.556	20	–	14	.588
Louisiana	10	–	8	.556	17	–	14	.548
Appalachian State	9	–	9	.500	17	–	15	.531
Georgia State	9	–	9	.500	15	–	15	.500
Arkansas State	6	–	12	.333	13	–	17	.433
Coastal Carolina	5	–	13	.278	12	–	21	.364
Georgia Southern	4	–	14	.222	15	–	18	.455
Texas State	4	–	14	.222	14	–	18	.438
South Alabama	2	–	16	.111	9	–	23	.281
† 2024 Sun Belt tournament winner

The 2023–24 South Alabama Jaguars women's basketball team represented the University of South Alabama during the 2023–24 NCAA Division I women's basketball season. The basketball team, led by first-year head coach Yolisha Jackson, played all home games at the Mitchell Center along with the South Alabama Jaguars men's basketball team. They were members of the Sun Belt Conference.

== Previous season ==
The Jaguars finished the 2022–23 season with a record of 7–23 overall and 3–15 in conference play. They lost to Georgia State in the first round of their conference tournament. They did not advance to postseason play.

On March 24, former South Florida coach Yolisha Jackson was hired to become the head coach of South Alabama.

== Roster ==
2023–24 South Alabama Jaguars women's basketball team
Players
Coaches

Pos.	#	Name	Height	Year	Previous school	Hometown
G	0	Chrysta Narcisse	5 ft 8 in (1.73 m)	Fr	Lafayette HS	Lafayette, Louisiana
C	1	Zena Elias	6 ft 3 in (1.91 m)	RS Sr	Countryside HS; Buffalo	Clearwater, Florida
G	2	Kelsey Thompson	5 ft 10 in (1.78 m)	So	Davidson HS	Mobile, Alabama
F	3	Naomi Smitherman	6 ft 1 in (1.85 m)	So	Ramsay HS	Birmingham, Alabama
G	4	Michiyah Simmons	5 ft 6 in (1.68 m)	So	Blanche Ely HS	Pompano Beach, Florida
G	5	Camryn Berry	5 ft 10 in (1.78 m)	Fr	Luella HS	Atlanta, Georgia
F	6	Kamaria Gipson	6 ft 3 in (1.91 m)	Sr	A. C. Jones HS; UT Arlington	Beeville, Texas
G	7	Tyrielle Williams	5 ft 7 in (1.7 m)	RS So	Ursuline Academy	New Orleans, Louisiana
G	10	Janelle Jones	5 ft 9 in (1.75 m)	RS So	B. T. Washington HS	Pensacola, Florida
G	11	Nadia Howard	5 ft 9 in (1.75 m)	Jr	Grayson HS	Grayson, Georgia
F	14	Kiana Anderson	6 ft 1 in (1.85 m)	GS	Warren Easton Charter HS; Trinity Valley CC	New Orleans, Louisiana
C	20	Cheyenne Pearson	6 ft 4 in (1.93 m)	Fr	Clay-Chalkville HS	Trussville, Alabama
G	22	Rachel Leggett	5 ft 8 in (1.73 m)	So	Navarre HS	Navarre, Florida
G	24	Jordan Rosier	5 ft 9 in (1.75 m)	Jr	Florida State University HS	Tallahassee, Florida
C	30	Debbie Reese	6 ft 1 in (1.85 m)	RS So	Lincoln Park Academy	Fort Pierce, Florida
F	33	Emani Burks	6 ft 2 in (1.88 m)	RS So	Palm Bay Magnet HS	Melbourne, Florida

Head coach

- Yolisha Jackson (Jacksonville)

Assistant coach(es)

- Eryc Pittman (Hampton)
- Colby Davis (South Alabama)
- Brooke LeMar (North Dakota State)

Legend

- (C) Team captain
- (S) Suspended
- (I) Ineligible
- (W) Walk-on
- Injured
- Current redshirt

Roster
Last update: 30 October 2023

== Schedule and results ==
Date time, TV	Rank^{#}	Opponent^{#}	Result	Record	High points	High rebounds	High assists	Site city, state
Exhibition
November 2, 2023*; 7:00 p.m.		West Alabama	W 70–30		12 – Tied	8 – Burks	7 – Thompson	Mitchell Center (340); Mobile, AL
Regular season
November 6, 2023*; 5:00 p.m., ESPN+		Mobile	W 74–61	1–0	19 – Thompson	12 – Anderson	5 – Thompson	Mitchell Center; Mobile, AL
November 9, 2023*; 7:00 p.m., ESPN+		Central Michigan; MAC-SBC Challenge	W 77–55	2–0	16 – Elias	9 – Elias	4 – Williams	Mitchell Center (415); Mobile, AL
November 14, 2023*; 7:00 p.m., ESPN+		Tougaloo	W 93–57	3–0	17 – Leggett	9 – Thompson	5 – Thompson	Mitchell Center (302); Mobile, AL
November 19, 2023*; 1:00 p.m., ACCNX		at No. 12 Florida State	L 45–80	3–1	11 – Williams	12 – Elias	4 – Williams	Donald L. Tucker Center (1,889); Tallahassee, FL
November 24, 2023*; 12:00 p.m.		vs. Nevada; University of Denver Classic	L 62–73	3–2	19 – Rosier	8 – Leggett	3 – Tied	Magness Arena (156); Denver, CO
November 25, 2023*; 2:00 p.m.		vs. Denver; University of Denver Classic	W 62–53	4–2	14 – Thompson	10 – Elias	2 – Tied	Magness Arena (612); Denver, CO
November 29, 2023*; 7:00 p.m., ESPN+		New Orleans	W 80–63	5–2	18 – Thompson	13 – Thompson	7 – Thompson	Mitchell Center (380); Mobile, AL
December 4, 2023*; 7:00 p.m., ESPN+		Nicholls	L 58–61	5–3	16 – Rosier	10 – Elias	4 – Williams	Mitchell Center (329); Mobile, AL
December 8, 2023*; 6:00 p.m.		at Florida A&M	W 68–65	6–3	14 – Thompson	8 – Anderson	4 – Simmons	Al Lawson Center (247); Tallahassee, FL
December 15, 2023*; 6:00 p.m., ESPN+		at Southeastern Louisiana	W 67–60	7–3	16 – Simmons	9 – Burks	3 – Tied	Pride Roofing University Center (629); Hammond, LA
December 18, 2023*; 6:00 p.m., ESPN+		Ole Miss	L 41–64	7–4	12 – Leggett	7 – Anderson	4 – Simmons	Mitchell Center (617); Mobile, AL
December 21, 2023*; 1:00 p.m., ESPN+		Louisiana Tech	L 34–68	7–5	8 – Thompson	9 – Elias	1 – Tied	Mitchell Center (294); Mobile, AL
December 30, 2023; 1:00 p.m., ESPN+		Old Dominion	L 56–62	7–6 (0–1)	13 – Leggett	9 – Elias	2 – Tied	Mitchell Center (326); Mobile, AL
January 4, 2024; 5:00 p.m., ESPN+		at Marshall	L 64–90	7–7 (0–2)	15 – Howard	6 – Elias	3 – Thompson	Cam Henderson Center (999); Huntington, WV
January 6, 2024; 1:00 p.m., ESPN+		at Appalachian State	L 49–96	7–8 (0–3)	11 – Simmons	10 – Elias	2 – Tied	Holmes Center (362); Boone, NC
January 11, 2024; 5:00 p.m., ESPN+		at Louisiana–Monroe	L 51–67	7–9 (0–4)	15 – Rosier	9 – Tied	2 – Jones	Fant–Ewing Coliseum (1,007); Monroe, LA
January 13, 2024; 2:00 p.m., ESPN+		at Southern Miss	L 69–77	7–10 (0–5)	20 – Thompson	5 – Thompson	3 – Rosier	Reed Green Coliseum (1,586); Hattiesburg, MS
January 17, 2024; 7:00 p.m., ESPN+		Arkansas State	L 69–78	7–11 (0–6)	25 – Thompson	7 – Leggett	3 – Tied	Mitchell Center (249); Mobile, AL
January 20, 2024; 1:00 p.m., ESPN+		Georgia State	L 47–73	7–12 (0–7)	11 – Rosier	8 – Burks	3 – Simmons	Mitchell Center; Mobile, AL
January 25, 2024; 11:00 a.m., ESPN+		Texas State	L 44–63	7–13 (0–8)	17 – Leggett	11 – Burks	6 – Simmons	Mitchell Center; Mobile, AL
January 27, 2024; 2:00 p.m., ESPN+		Southern Miss	L 43–77	7–14 (0–9)	16 – Simmons	4 – Simmons	4 – Simmons	Mitchell Center (331); Mobile, AL
January 31, 2024; 5:00 p.m., ESPN+		at Arkansas State	L 61–73	7–15 (0–10)	14 – Tied	8 – Leggett	6 – Thompson	First National Bank Arena; Jonesboro, AR
February 3, 2024; 2:00 p.m., ESPN+		at Texas State	W 65–64	8–15 (1–10)	27 – Thompson	9 – Leggett	3 – Tied	Strahan Arena; San Marcos, TX
February 7, 2024; 6:00 p.m., ESPN+		at James Madison	L 66–82	8–16 (1–11)	18 – Rosier	8 – Burks	4 – Howard	Atlantic Union Bank Center (3,087); Harrisonburg, VA
February 10, 2024*; 12:00 p.m., ESPN+		at Eastern Michigan; MAC-SBC Challenge	L 69–81	8–17	23 – Rosier	3 – Simmons	5 – Thompson	Convocation Center (1,318); Ypsilanti, MI
February 15, 2024; 5:00 p.m., ESPN+		Louisiana–Monroe	L 60–68	8–18 (1–12)	20 – Rosier	8 – Leggett	6 – Thompson	Mitchell Center; Mobile, AL
February 17, 2024; 1:00 p.m., ESPN+		Georgia Southern	L 70–85	8–19 (1–13)	18 – Leggett	9 – Leggett	4 – Simmons	Mitchell Center; Mobile, AL
February 21, 2024; 7:00 p.m., ESPN+		Louisiana	L 42–74	8–20 (1–14)	9 – Burks	6 – Howard	2 – Simmons	Mitchell Center (258); Mobile, AL
February 24, 2024; 2:00 p.m., ESPN+		Troy	L 79–88	8–21 (1–15)	21 – Simmons	11 – Leggett	3 – Tied	Mitchell Center (358); Mobile, AL
February 27, 2024; 6:00 p.m., ESPN+		at Louisiana	W 46–43	9–21 (2–15)	17 – Simmons	7 – Simmons	2 – Tied	Cajundome (826); Lafayette, LA
March 1, 2024; 6:00 p.m., ESPN+		at Troy	L 71–108	9–22 (2–16)	26 – Leggett	9 – Leggett	4 – Williams	Trojan Arena (2,796); Troy, AL
Sun Belt tournament
March 5, 2024; 2:00 p.m., ESPN+	(14)	vs. (11) Coastal Carolina; First round	L 60–79	9–23	21 – Leggett	8 – Smitherman	3 – Simmons	Pensacola Bay Center (453); Pensacola, FL
*Non-conference game. ^{#}Rankings from AP Poll. (#) Tournament seedings in parentheses. All times are in Central Time.

- Source: South Alabama Athletics

== See also ==
- 2023–24 South Alabama Jaguars men's basketball team
