= 2023–24 Georgia State Panthers women's basketball team =

Intercollegiate basketball season

2023–24 Georgia State Panthers women's basketball
- Conference: Sun Belt Conference
- Record: 15–15 (9–9 Sun Belt)
- Head coach: Gene Hill (6th season)
- Assistant coaches: Jon Bollier; Shanasa Sanders; Patechia Hartman
- Home arena: Georgia State Convocation Center

2023–24 Sun Belt Conference women's basketball standings
	Conf.				Overall
Team	W		L	PCT	W		L	PCT
Marshall †	17	–	1	.944	26	–	7	.788
Troy	15	–	3	.833	22	–	12	.647
James Madison	13	–	5	.722	23	–	12	.657
Old Dominion	12	–	6	.667	22	–	10	.688
Louisiana–Monroe	10	–	8	.556	21	–	14	.600
Southern Miss	10	–	8	.556	20	–	14	.588
Louisiana	10	–	8	.556	17	–	14	.548
Appalachian State	9	–	9	.500	17	–	15	.531
Georgia State	9	–	9	.500	15	–	15	.500
Arkansas State	6	–	12	.333	13	–	17	.433
Coastal Carolina	5	–	13	.278	12	–	21	.364
Georgia Southern	4	–	14	.222	15	–	18	.455
Texas State	4	–	14	.222	14	–	18	.438
South Alabama	2	–	16	.111	9	–	23	.281
† 2024 Sun Belt tournament winner

The 2023–24 Georgia State Panthers women's basketball team represented Georgia State University during the 2023–24 NCAA Division I women's basketball season. The basketball team, led by sixth-year head coach Gene Hill, played all home games at the Georgia State Convocation Center in Atlanta, Georgia, along with the Georgia State Panthers men's basketball team. They were members of the Sun Belt Conference.

The Panthers finished the season 15–15, 9–9 in Sun Belt play, to finish in a tie for eighth place. They were defeated by Appalachian State in the second round of the Sun Belt tournament.

== Roster ==
2023–24 Georgia State Panthers women's basketball team
Players
Coaches

Pos.	#	Name	Height	Year	Previous school	Hometown
G	0	Eghosa Obasuyi	5 ft 5 in (1.65 m)	Fr	Carrollton HS	Villa Rica, GA
F	1	Patience Williams	5 ft 11 in (1.8 m)	So	Benilde-St. Margaret's; South Florida	Minneapolis, MN
G	2	Mikyla Tolivert	5 ft 6 in (1.68 m)	Jr	Palm Bay Magnet HS	Melbourne, FL
G	5	Ciara Smith	5 ft 9 in (1.75 m)	Sr	Riverwood International Charter	Atlanta, GA
G	10	Kamryn Dziak	5 ft 8 in (1.73 m)	Sr	M. L. Steele HS	Amherst, OH
F	11	Deasia Merrill	6 ft 1 in (1.85 m)	RS Sr	Villa Rica HS	Villa Rica, GA
G	15	Aniya Palmer	6 ft 1 in (1.85 m)	Fr	Troup County HS; Mississippi State	LaGrange, GA
F	20	Alyssa Phillip	6 ft 0 in (1.83 m)	Jr	Wesleyan	Norcross, GA
G	21	Erin Turral	5 ft 6 in (1.68 m)	Jr	Florida A&M Developmental Research; Stony Brook	Tallahassee, FL
G	22	Mya Williams	5 ft 7 in (1.7 m)	Jr	Waxahachie HS; Hutchinson CC	Waxahachie, TX
G	30	Crystal Henderson	5 ft 5 in (1.65 m)	Fr	Kell HS	Marietta, GA
F	33	Christeina Bryan	6 ft 1 in (1.85 m)	Sr	Camperdown HS; Arizona Western	St. Thomas, Jamaica
F	44	Aaliyah Hunt	6 ft 3 in (1.91 m)	Fr	Peachtree Ridge HS	Lawrenceville, GA

Head coach

- Gene Hill (Coker)

Assistant coach(es)

- Jon Bollier (Samford)
- Shanasa Sanders (Stetson)
- Patechia Hartman (Georgia State)

Legend

- (C) Team captain
- (S) Suspended
- (I) Ineligible
- (W) Walk-on
- Injured
- Current redshirt

Roster
Last update: September 29, 2024

== Schedule and results ==
Date time, TV	Rank^{#}	Opponent^{#}	Result	Record	Site city, state
Non-conference regular season
November 6, 2023*; 6:30 p.m., ESPN+		Berry	W 78–41	1–0	GSU Convocation Center (697); Atlanta, GA
November 10, 2023*; 6:30 p.m., ESPN+		Western Michigan; SBC–MAC Challenge	W 71–58	2–0	GSU Convocation Center (703); Atlanta, GA
November 14, 2023*; 6:30 p.m., ESPN+		Kennesaw State	W 62–52	3–0	GSU Convocation Center (813); Atlanta, GA
November 22, 2023*; 12:00 p.m., ESPN+		Bethune–Cookman; GSU Thanksgiving Tournament	L 48–56	3–1	GSU Convocation Center (839); Atlanta, GA
November 23, 2023*; 12:00 p.m., ESPN+		Elon; GSU Thanksgiving Tournament	L 68–75	3–2	GSU Convocation Center (771); Atlanta, GA
November 28, 2023*; 7:00 p.m., ESPN+		at Western Carolina	W 90–57	4–2	Ramsey Center (626); Cullowhee, NC
December 10, 2023*; 2:00 p.m., ACCNX		at Georgia Tech	L 70–94	4–3	McCamish Pavilion (1,727); Atlanta, GA
December 14, 2023*; 6:00 p.m., ESPN+		at Winthrop	L 60–65	4–4	Winthrop Coliseum (211); Rock Hill, SC
December 16, 2023*; 2:00 p.m.		at Clemson	W 78–72	5–4	Littlejohn Coliseum (770); Clemson, SC
December 19, 2023*; 1:30 p.m., ESPN+		LaGrange	W 93–51	6–4	GSU Convocation Center (2,034); Atlanta, GA
Sun Belt regular season
December 30, 2023; 4:30 p.m., ESPN+		at Troy	W 90–89 ^{OT}	7–4 (1–0)	Trojan Arena (1,887); Troy, AL
January 4, 2024; 6:30 p.m., ESPN+		Louisiana–Monroe	L 65–82	7–5 (1–1)	GSU Convocation Center (743); Atlanta, GA
January 6, 2024; 2:00 p.m., ESPN+		Texas State	W 64–55	8–5 (2–1)	GSU Convocation Center (765); Atlanta, GA
January 11, 2024; 11:00 a.m., ESPN+		Marshall	L 78–90	8–6 (2–2)	GSU Convocation Center (1,329); Atlanta, GA
January 13, 2024; 2:00 p.m., ESPN+		Appalachian State	W 73–68	9–6 (3–2)	GSU Convocation Center (1,448); Atlanta, GA
January 18, 2024; 7:00 p.m., ESPN+		at Southern Miss	L 75–82	9–7 (3–3)	Reed Green Coliseum (1,448); Hattiesburg, MS
January 20, 2024; 6:00 p.m., ESPN+		at South Alabama	W 73–47	10–7 (4–3)	Mitchell Center; Mobile, AL
January 24, 2024; 6:00 p.m., ESPN+		at Georgia Southern; Modern Day Hate	W 74–66	11–7 (5–3)	Hanner Fieldhouse (782); Statesboro, GA
January 27, 2024; 2:00 p.m., ESPN+		at Old Dominion	L 65–73	11–8 (5–4)	Chartway Arena (3,198); Norfolk, VA
January 31, 2024; 6:30 p.m., ESPN+		James Madison	W 82–72	12–8 (6–4)	GSU Convocation Center (749); Atlanta, GA
February 3, 2024; 1:00 p.m., ESPN+		Georgia Southern; Modern Day Hate	W 74–49	13–8 (7–4)	GSU Convocation Center (1,621); Atlanta, GA
February 7, 2024; 6:30 p.m., ESPN+		Arkansas State	W 58–56	14–8 (8–4)	GSU Convocation Center (920); Atlanta, GA
February 10, 2024; 1:00 p.m., ESPN+		at Miami (OH); SBC–MAC Challenge	L 63–80	14–9	Millett Hall (346); Oxford, OH
February 15, 2024; 5:00 p.m., ESPN+		at James Madison	W 73–62	15–9 (9–4)	Atlantic Union Bank Center (2,191); Harrisonburg, VA
February 17, 2024; 2:00 p.m., ESPN+		at Appalachian State	L 67–93	15–10 (9–5)	Holmes Center (457); Boone, NC
February 22, 2024; 6:30 p.m., ESPN+		Coastal Carolina	L 52–60	15–11 (9–6)	GSU Convocation Center (927); Atlanta, GA
February 24, 2024; 5:00 p.m., ESPN+		Old Dominion	L 51–67	15–12 (9–7)	GSU Convocation Center (1,536); Atlanta, GA
February 27, 2024; 6:00 p.m., ESPN+		at Marshall	L 69–97	15–13 (9–8)	Cam Henderson Center (2,554); Huntington, WV
March 1, 2024; 6:30 p.m., ESPN+		at Coastal Carolina	L 62–74	15–14 (9–9)	HTC Center (461); Conway, SC
Sun Belt tournament
March 6, 2024; 12:30 p.m., ESPN+	(8)	vs. (9) Appalachian State; Second round	L 68–73	15–15	Pensacola Bay Center (410); Pensacola, FL
*Non-conference game. ^{#}Rankings from AP poll. (#) Tournament seedings in parentheses. All times are in Eastern.

== See also ==
- 2023–24 Georgia State Panthers men's basketball team
