= 2023–24 Georgia Southern Eagles women's basketball team =

Intercollegiate basketball season

2023–24 Georgia Southern Eagles women's basketball
- Conference: Sun Belt Conference
- Record: 15–18 (4–14 Sun Belt)
- Head coach: Anita Howard (5th season)
- Assistant coaches: Dexter Jenkins; Olivia Gaines; Chris Godfrey
- Home arena: Hanner Fieldhouse

2023–24 Sun Belt Conference women's basketball standings
	Conf.				Overall
Team	W		L	PCT	W		L	PCT
Marshall †	17	–	1	.944	26	–	7	.788
Troy	15	–	3	.833	22	–	12	.647
James Madison	13	–	5	.722	23	–	12	.657
Old Dominion	12	–	6	.667	22	–	10	.688
Louisiana–Monroe	10	–	8	.556	21	–	14	.600
Southern Miss	10	–	8	.556	20	–	14	.588
Louisiana	10	–	8	.556	17	–	14	.548
Appalachian State	9	–	9	.500	17	–	15	.531
Georgia State	9	–	9	.500	15	–	15	.500
Arkansas State	6	–	12	.333	13	–	17	.433
Coastal Carolina	5	–	13	.278	12	–	21	.364
Georgia Southern	4	–	14	.222	15	–	18	.455
Texas State	4	–	14	.222	14	–	18	.438
South Alabama	2	–	16	.111	9	–	23	.281
† 2024 Sun Belt tournament winner

The 2023–24 Georgia Southern Eagles women's basketball team represented Georgia Southern University during the 2023–24 NCAA Division I women's basketball season. The Southern Eagles, led by fifth-year head coach Anita Howard, played all home games at the Hanner Fieldhouse in Statesboro, Georgia as members of the Sun Belt Conference.

== Roster ==
2023–24 Georgia Southern Eagles women's basketball team
Players
Coaches

Pos.	#	Name	Height	Year	Previous school	Hometown
G	0	Torrion Starks	5 ft 8 in (1.73 m)	Jr	Hart County HS; East Georgia State	Hartwell, GA
G	1	Kanija Daniel	5 ft 10 in (1.78 m)	Fr	Carrollton HS	Carrollton, GA
G	2	Paris Miller	5 ft 10 in (1.78 m)	So	Johns Creek HS	Hampton, GA
G	3	Terren Ward	5 ft 11 in (1.8 m)	Sr	Wayne County HS	Jesup, GA
G	4	Constance Thomas	5 ft 8 in (1.73 m)	Sr	Camp Jewell House; Penn State	Plant City, FL
F	5	Diamond Stokes	6 ft 3 in (1.91 m)	Sr	Simeon Career; Wright State	Chicago, IL
F	11	Shy Booker	6 ft 1 in (1.85 m)	GS	Ardrey Kelly HS; Austin Peay State	Charlotte, NC
F	12	Liv Fuller	5 ft 10 in (1.78 m)	Fr	Clearwater HS	Clearwater, FL
F	14	Kayla Thomas	6 ft 3 in (1.91 m)	Jr	Emerge Christian Academy; Penn State	Beltsville, MD
G/F	15	Zaria Johnson	6 ft 1 in (1.85 m)	Jr	Hightower HS; Gulf Coast State	Houston, TX
G	21	Amoni Byrd	5 ft 9 in (1.75 m)	So	Archbishop Molloy HS	Bayside, NY
G	22	Ja'nya Love-Hill	5 ft 5 in (1.65 m)	GS	G.W. Carver HS	Columbus, GA
G/F	33	Simone James	5 ft 10 in (1.78 m)	Sr	Christian HS	San Diego, CA
F	41	Eden Johnson	6 ft 2 in (1.88 m)	RS Sr	Haines City HS; Fordham	Kissimmee, FL
C	55	Lydia Freeman	6 ft 5 in (1.96 m)	Sr	Westlake HS	Atlanta, GA

Head coach

- Anita Howard (Armstrong State)

Assistant coach(es)

- Dexter Jenkins (North Carolina Central)
- Olivia Gaines (South Carolina)
- Chris Godfrey (Armstrong State)

Legend

- (C) Team captain
- (S) Suspended
- (I) Ineligible
- (W) Walk-on
- Injured
- Current redshirt

Roster
Last update: December 18, 2023

== Schedule and results ==
Date time, TV	Rank^{#}	Opponent^{#}	Result	Record	Site city, state
Non-conference regular season
November 8, 2023*; 6:00 p.m., ESPN+		Allen	W 103–49	1–0	Hanner Fieldhouse (917); Statesboro, GA
November 11, 2023*; 2:00 p.m., ESPN+		Eastern Michigan; MAC–SBC Challenge	W 82–58	2–0	Hanner Fieldhouse (511); Statesboro, GA
November 13, 2023*; 7:00 p.m., SECN+		at Georgia	L 59–85	2–1	Stegeman Coliseum (2,109); Athens, GA
November 16, 2023*; 6:30 p.m., ESPN+		at Jacksonville	L 59–61	2–2	Swisher Gymnasium (378); Jacksonville, FL
November 20, 2023*; 6:00 p.m., ESPN+		Life	W 97–49	3–2	Hanner Fieldhouse (573); Statesboro, GA
November 24, 2023*; 4:30 p.m., ESPN+		North Florida; GATA Turkey Throwdown	W 85–75	4–2	Hanner Fieldhouse (459); Statesboro, GA
November 29, 2023*; 4:30 p.m., ESPN+		Detroit Mercy; GATA Turkey Throwdown	W 81–59	5–2	Hanner Fieldhouse (502); Statesboro, GA
November 29, 2023*; 3:00 p.m., ESPN+		at FIU	W 81–69	6–2	Ocean Bank Convocation Center (323); Miami, FL
December 11, 2023*; 4:00 p.m., YouTube		at Chicago State	W 111–67	7–2	Jones Convocation Center (48); Chicago, IL
December 14, 2023*; 11:00 a.m., ESPN+		Charleston Southern	W 81–59	8–2	Hanner Fieldhouse (2,808); Statesboro, GA
December 19, 2023*; 3:00 p.m.		vs. Hampton; Coastal Empire Eagle Classic	W 74–48	9–2	Enmarket Arena (407); Savannah, GA
December 22, 2023*; 1:00 p.m., ESPN+		at Longwood	W 87–65	10–2	Joan Perry Brook Center (957); Farmville, VA
Sun Belt regular season
December 30, 2023; 3:00 p.m., ESPN+		at Texas State	W 70–69	11–2 (1–0)	Strahan Arena (851); San Marcos, TX
January 4, 2024; 6:00 p.m., ESPN+		Troy	L 71–74	11–3 (1–1)	Hanner Fieldhouse (515); Statesboro, GA
January 6, 2024; 2:00 p.m., ESPN+		Louisiana–Monroe	W 69–66	12–3 (2–1)	Hanner Fieldhouse (643); Statesboro, GA
January 11, 2024; 6:00 p.m., ESPN+		Appalachian State	W 83–77	13–3 (3–1)	Hanner Fieldhouse (812); Statesboro, GA
January 13, 2024; 2:00 p.m., ESPN+		Old Dominion	L 50–70	13–4 (3–2)	Hanner Fieldhouse (697); Statesboro, GA
January 18, 2024; 5:00 p.m., ESPN+		at James Madison	L 51–72	13–5 (3–3)	Atlantic Union Bank Center (2,160); Harrisonburg, VA
January 20, 2024; 2:00 p.m., ESPN+		at Appalachian State	L 74–82	13–6 (3–4)	Holmes Center (370); Boone, NC
January 24, 2024; 6:00 p.m., ESPN+		Georgia State	L 66–74	13–7 (3–5)	Hanner Fieldhouse (782); Statesboro, GA
January 27, 2024; 2:00 p.m., ESPN+		Marshall	L 95–106	13–8 (3–6)	Hanner Fieldhouse (763); Statesboro, GA
February 1, 2024; 6:00 p.m., ESPN+		at Coastal Carolina	L 55–73	13–9 (3–7)	HTC Center (681); Conway, SC
February 3, 2024; 1:00 p.m., ESPN+		at Georgia State	L 49–74	13–10 (3–8)	GSU Convocation Center (1,621); Atlanta, GA
February 7, 2024; 6:00 p.m., ESPN+		Southern Miss	L 54–62	13–11 (3–9)	Hanner Fieldhouse (632); Statesboro, GA
February 10, 2024*; ESPN+		at Northern Illinois; MAC–SBC Challenge	L 84–91	13–12	Convocation Center (846); DeKalb, IL
February 15, 2024; 7:00 p.m., ESPN+		at Louisiana	L 57–62	13–13 (3–10)	Cajundome (608); Lafayette, LA
February 17, 2024; 2:00 p.m., ESPN+		at South Alabama	W 85–70	14–13 (4–10)	Mitchell Center; Mobile, AL
February 22, 2024; 5:00 p.m., ESPN+		James Madison	L 65–71	14–14 (4–11)	Hanner Fieldhouse (659); Statesboro, GA
February 24, 2024; 2:00 p.m., ESPN+		Coastal Carolina	L 81–87	14–15 (4–12)	Hanner Fieldhouse; Statesboro, GA
February 27, 2024; 6:30 p.m., ESPN+		at Old Dominion	L 54–61	14–16 (4–13)	Chartway Arena (1,896); Norfolk, VA
March 1, 2024; 6:00 p.m., ESPN+		at Marshall	L 43–90	14–17 (4–14)	Cam Henderson Center (2,791); Huntington, WV
Sun Belt tournament
March 5, 2024; 12:30 p.m., ESPN+	(12)	vs. (12) Texas State; First round	W 72–70	15–17	Pensacola Bay Center (380); Pensacola, FL
March 6, 2024; 3:10 p.m., ESPN+	(12)	vs. (5) Louisiana–Monroe; Second round	L 57–78	15–18	Pensacola Bay Center (902); Pensacola, FL
*Non-conference game. ^{#}Rankings from AP poll. (#) Tournament seedings in parentheses. All times are in Eastern.

== See also ==
- 2023–24 Georgia Southern Eagles men's basketball team
