= 2023–24 Chicago State Cougars women's basketball team =

American college basketball season

2023–24 Chicago State Cougars women's basketball
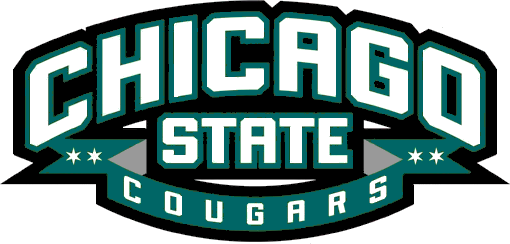
- Conference: Independent
- Record: 1–26
- Head coach: Andrea Williams (2nd season)
- Assistant coaches: Cierra Bond; Mariah Miller
- Home arena: Jones Convocation Center

2023–24 NCAA Division I women's basketball independents standings
	Conf.				Overall
Team	W		L	PCT	W		L	PCT
Chicago State		–		–	1	–	26	.037

The 2023–24 Chicago State Cougars women's basketball team represented Chicago State University during the 2023–24 NCAA Division I women's basketball season. The Cougars, who were led by second-year head coach Andrea Williams, played their home games at the Emil and Patricia Jones Convocation Center in Chicago, Illinois and competed as an independent with no conference affiliation. They finished the season with a record of 1–26. On February 25, 2024, head coach Andrea Williams was fired after only two seasons, posting a combined record of 7–48 during those two seasons.

This was the Cougars' final season competing as an independent, with the university set to join the Northeast Conference, effective July 1, 2024.

== Previous season ==
The Cougars finished the 2022–23 season 6–22.

== Roster ==
2023–24 Chicago State Cougars women's basketball team
Players
Coaches

Pos.	#	Name	Height	Year	Previous school	Hometown
G	2	Tae'lor Willard	5 ft 6 in (1.68 m)	Sr	Grayson College	Arlington County, VA
G	5	Hailey Hohenecker	5 ft 3 in (1.6 m)	Jr	Little Rock	Plymouth, MN
G/F	10	Laura Segues	5 ft 10 in (1.78 m)	Sr	Institut Pere Vives Vich	Castellolí, Spain
F	11	Princess Hester	6 ft 1 in (1.85 m)	So	Wachee HS	Spring Hill, FL
F	12	Taylor Norris	5 ft 10 in (1.78 m)	Jr	Bishop Kearney HS	Rochester, NY
C	14	Josie Hill	6 ft 1 in (1.85 m)	So	Central HS	Rapid City, SD
G	15	Jacia Cunningham	5 ft 8 in (1.73 m)	So	Milwaukee School of Languages	Milwaukee, WI
F	30	Evangelina Parrish	6 ft 0 in (1.83 m)	Jr	Schoolcraft College	Ypsilanti, MI
F	31	Yzabelle Laualofa Tevao	6 ft 1 in (1.85 m)	Jr	Massey HS	South Auckland, New Zealand
G	32	Claire Simmons	5 ft 10 in (1.78 m)	Jr	Indian River State College	Louisville, KY
C	40	ZiKeyah Carter	6 ft 6 in (1.98 m)	Jr	Chattahoochee Valley CC	Waverly Hall, GA

Head coach

- Andrea Williams (Vincennes)

Assistant coach(es)

- Cierra Bond (Oakland)
- Mariah Miller (Cleveland State)

Legend

- (C) Team captain
- (S) Suspended
- (I) Ineligible
- (W) Walk-on
- Injured
- Current redshirt

Roster
Last update: March 10, 2024

== Schedule and results ==
Date time, TV	Rank^{#}	Opponent^{#}	Result	Record	Site (attendance) city, state
Regular season
November 6, 2023*; 4:00 p.m.		Loyola Chicago	L 47–74	0–1	Jones Convocation Center (143); Chicago, IL
November 10, 2023*; 6:00 p.m., ESPN+		at Detroit Mercy	L 48–83	0–2	Calihan Hall (480); Detroit, MI
November 12, 2023*; 1:00 p.m., B1G+		at Minnesota	L 42–100	0–3	Williams Arena (2,856); Minneapolis, MN
November 14, 2023*; 5:00 p.m.		Ball State	L 56–85	0–4	Jones Convocation Center (–); Chicago, IL
November 17, 2023*; 7:00 p.m., ESPN+		at Florida Atlantic	L 57–80	0–5	Eleanor R. Baldwin Arena (492); Boca Raton, FL
November 21, 2023*; 6:00 p.m., ACCNX		at No. 17 Notre Dame	L 35–113	0–6	Purcell Pavilion (4,987); Notre Dame, IN
November 22, 2023*; 12:00 p.m.		vs. Kansas City; Cleveland State Tournament	L 46–77	0–7	Woodling Gym (–); Cleveland, OH
November 24, 2023*; 12:00 p.m., ESPN+		at Cleveland State; Cleveland State Tournament	L 41–95	0–8	Woodling Gym (380); Cleveland, OH
November 25, 2023*; 11:30 a.m.		vs. Austin Peay; Cleveland State Tournament	L 49–60	0–9	Woodling Gym (266); Cleveland, OH
November 26, 2023*; 1:00 p.m.		Evansville	L 102–103 ^{3OT}	0–10	Jones Convocation Center (79); Chicago, IL
November 28, 2023*; 7:00 p.m., ESPN+		at Western Illinois	L 72–86	0–11	Western Hall (566); Macomb, IL
November 30, 2023*; 6:30 p.m., ESPN+		at Illinois State	L 47–102	0–12	CEFCU Arena (916); Normal, IL
December 2, 2023*; 1:00 p.m.		Norfolk State	L 68–76	0–13	Jones Convocation Center (72); Chicago, IL
December 9, 2023*; 1:00 p.m., ESPN+		at Valparaiso	L 64–83	0–14	Athletics–Recreation Center (376); Valparaiso, IN
December 10, 2023*; 1:00 p.m., FloHoops		at Butler	L 51–84	0–15	Hinkle Fieldhouse (654); Indianapolis, IN
December 11, 2023*; 3:00 p.m.		Georgia Southern	L 67–111	0–16	Jones Convocation Center (48); Chicago, IL
December 15, 2023*; 7:00 p.m., ESPN+		at UIC	L 46–76	0–17	Credit Union 1 Arena (942); Chicago, IL
December 18, 2023*; 1:00 p.m.		vs. Alabama A&M; Florida International Tournament	L 43–80	0–18	Ocean Bank Convocation Center (331); Miami, FL
December 19, 2023*; 1:30 p.m.		vs. Texas State; Florida International Tournament	L 76–84	0–19	Ocean Bank Convocation Center (321); Miami, FL
December 20, 2023*; 11:00 a.m., ESPN+		at FIU; Florida International Tournament	L 55–73	0–20	Ocean Bank Convocation Center (326); Miami, FL
January 6, 2024*; 1:00 p.m.		Idaho	L 52–80	0–21	Jones Convocation Center (43); Chicago, IL
January 10, 2024*; 7:00 p.m.		Kuyper	W 105–37	1–21	Jones Convocation Center (110); Chicago, IL
January 15, 2024*; 1:00 p.m.		LIU	L 58–66	1–22	Jones Convocation Center (84); Chicago, IL
January 21, 2024*; 2:00 p.m.		Central Michigan	L 55–66	1–23	Jones Convocation Center (130); Chicago, IL
January 23, 2024*; 7:00 p.m.		Purdue Fort Wayne	L 76–102	1–24	Jones Convocation Center (154); Chicago, IL
February 5, 2024*; 4:00 p.m., NEC Front Row		at LIU	L 71–80	1–25	Steinberg Wellness Center (182); Brooklyn, NY
February 20, 2024*; 7:00 p.m.		Eastern Kentucky	L 63–85	1–26	Jones Convocation Center (313); Chicago, IL
*Non-conference game. ^{#}Rankings from AP poll. (#) Tournament seedings in parentheses. All times are in Central.
