= 2023–24 Southern Miss Lady Eagles basketball team =

American college basketball season

2023–24 Southern Miss Lady Eagles basketball

WNIT, Super 16
- Conference: Sun Belt Conference
- Record: 20–14 (10–8 Sun Belt)
- Head coach: Joye Lee-McNelis (20th season)
- Assistant coaches: Jack Trosper; Jessica Barber; Barbara Farris
- Home arena: Reed Green Coliseum

2023–24 Sun Belt Conference women's basketball standings
	Conf.				Overall
Team	W		L	PCT	W		L	PCT
Marshall †	17	–	1	.944	26	–	7	.788
Troy	15	–	3	.833	22	–	12	.647
James Madison	13	–	5	.722	23	–	12	.657
Old Dominion	12	–	6	.667	22	–	10	.688
Louisiana–Monroe	10	–	8	.556	21	–	14	.600
Southern Miss	10	–	8	.556	20	–	14	.588
Louisiana	10	–	8	.556	17	–	14	.548
Appalachian State	9	–	9	.500	17	–	15	.531
Georgia State	9	–	9	.500	15	–	15	.500
Arkansas State	6	–	12	.333	13	–	17	.433
Coastal Carolina	5	–	13	.278	12	–	21	.364
Georgia Southern	4	–	14	.222	15	–	18	.455
Texas State	4	–	14	.222	14	–	18	.438
South Alabama	2	–	16	.111	9	–	23	.281
† 2024 Sun Belt tournament winner

The 2023–24 Southern Miss Lady Eagles basketball team represented the University of Southern Mississippi during the 2023–24 NCAA Division I women's basketball season. The team was led by 20th-year head coach Joye Lee-McNelis, and played their home games at the Reed Green Coliseum in Hattiesburg, Mississippi as a member of the Sun Belt Conference. They finished the season 20–14, 10–8 in Sun Belt play, to finish in a three-way tie for fifth place.

== Previous season ==
The Lady Eagles finished as co-conference champions for the 2022–23 basketball season with an overall record of 21–10 and 13–5 in Sun Belt play to finish in a three-way tie for first place. They lost in the conference tournament to Texas State 85–57 and were unable to secure a bid into the NCAA tournament.

Despite her recurring lung cancer, head coach Joye Lee-McNelis stated that she would be back to coach the 2023–24 season.

== Roster ==
2023–24 Southern Miss Lady Eagles women's basketball team
Players
Coaches

Pos.	#	Name	Height	Year	Previous school	Hometown
G	0	Brikayla Gray	5 ft 8 in (1.73 m)	RS Jr	West Jones HS	New Hebron, MS
G	2	Domonique Davis	5 ft 6 in (1.68 m)	Sr	DeRidder HS	DeRidder, LA
G	3	Jaccoriah Bracey	5 ft 9 in (1.75 m)	Jr	Thomas Edwards HS	Drew, MS
G	4	Noelani Cornfield	5 ft 6 in (1.68 m)	Jr	Lake Shore HS	Gowanda, NY
G	5	Emma Wallhoff	5 ft 10 in (1.78 m)	Jr	Westminster Academy	Fort Lauderdale, FL
F	10	Mahoganie Williams	6 ft 1 in (1.85 m)	GS	Ouachita Parish HS	Monroe, LA
G	12	Morgan Sieper	6 ft 0 in (1.83 m)	Fr	H.B. Plant HS	Tampa, FL
G	14	Nyla Jean	5 ft 5 in (1.65 m)	Jr	H.B. Plant HS	Tampa, FL
G	24	Mikaylah Manley	5 ft 8 in (1.73 m)	Fr	Barbe HS	Lake Charles, LA
G	25	Elle Blatchford	5 ft 10 in (1.78 m)	Fr	Sequoyah HS	Canton, GA
C	32	Atria Dumas	6 ft 3 in (1.91 m)	So	North Shore HS	Houston, TX
F	35	Asjha Leake	6 ft 3 in (1.91 m)	Jr	Steele HS	Cibolo, TX
C	45	Melyia Grayson	6 ft 3 in (1.91 m)	RS Jr	Hattiesburg HS	Hattiesburg, MS

Head coach

- Joye Lee-McNelis (Southern Miss)

Assistant coach(es)

- Jack Trosper (Texas A&M–Corpus Christi)
- Jessica Barber (Mobile)
- Barbara Farris (Tulane)

Legend

- (C) Team captain
- (S) Suspended
- (I) Ineligible
- (W) Walk-on
- Injured
- Current redshirt

Roster
Last update: January 9, 2024

== Schedule and results ==
Date time, TV	Rank^{#}	Opponent^{#}	Result	Record	Site (attendance) city, state
Exhibition
November 1, 2023*; 6:00 p.m.		Mississippi College	W 96–44		Reed Green Coliseum (350); Hattiesburg, MS
Non-conference regular season
November 6, 2023*; 11:00 a.m., ESPN+		William Carey	W 88–46	1–0	Reed Green Coliseum (3,566); Hattiesburg, MS
November 11, 2023*; 2:00 p.m., ESPN+		Akron; MAC–SBC Challenge	W 77–60	2–0	Reed Green Coliseum (1,375); Hattiesburg, MS
November 18, 2023*; 5:00 p.m., ESPN+		at North Alabama	W 91–63	3–0	Flowers Hall; Florence, AL
November 21, 2023*; 6:00 p.m., ESPN+		Valparaiso	W 61–49	4–0	Reed Green Coliseum (1,374); Hattiesburg, MS
November 24, 2023*; 11:00 a.m., ESPN+		North Dakota; Lady Eagle Thanksgiving Classic	W 75–53	5–0	Reed Green Coliseum (1,366); Hattiesburg, MS
November 25, 2023*; 4:00 p.m., ESPN+		Samford; Lady Eagle Thanksgiving Classic	W 51–33	6–0	Reed Green Coliseum (1,489); Hattiesburg, MS
December 2, 2023*; 2:00 p.m., ESPN+		No. 19 Ole Miss	W 61–59	7–0	Reed Green Coliseum (2,653); Hattiesburg, MS
December 10, 2023*; 2:00 p.m., ESPN+		at Memphis	L 67–69	7–1	Elma Roane Fieldhouse (1,077); Memphis, TN
December 20, 2023*; 3:30 p.m.		vs. Cleveland State; Homewood Suites Classic	L 63–70	7–2	Alico Arena (108); Fort Myers, FL
December 21, 2023*; 6:00 p.m., ESPN+		at Florida Gulf Coast; Homewood Suites Classic	L 62–78	7–3	Alice Arena (1,319); Fort Myers, FL
Sun Belt regular season
December 30, 2023; 2:00 p.m., ESPN+		Marshall	L 72–87	7–4 (0–1)	Reed Green Coliseum (1,538); Hattiesburg, MS
January 3, 2024; 5:00 p.m., ESPN+		at Coastal Carolina	L 71–88	7–5 (0–2)	HTC Center (331); Conway, SC
January 6, 2024; 12:00 p.m., ESPN+		at Old Dominion	L 62–68	7–6 (0–3)	Chartway Arena (1,816); Norfolk, VA
January 11, 2024; 6:00 p.m., ESPN+		James Madison	L 76–81	7–7 (0–4)	Reed Green Coliseum (1,368); Hattiesburg, MS
January 13, 2024; 2:00 p.m., ESPN+		South Alabama	W 77–69	8–7 (1–4)	Reed Green Coliseum (1,586); Hattiesburg, MS
January 18, 2024; 6:00 p.m., ESPN+		Georgia State	W 82–75	9–7 (2–4)	Reed Green Coliseum (1,448); Hattiesburg, MS
January 20, 2024; 12:00 p.m., ESPN+		Louisiana–Monroe	L 58–70	9–8 (2–5)	Reed Green Coliseum (5,587); Hattiesburg, MS
January 25, 2024; 6:00 p.m., ESPN+		at Troy	L 70–77	9–9 (2–6)	Trojan Arena (1,567); Troy, AL
January 27, 2024; 2:00 p.m., ESPN+		at South Alabama	W 77–43	10–9 (3–6)	Mitchell Center (331); Mobile, AL
February 1, 2024; 6:00 p.m., ESPN+		Louisiana	W 55–48	11–9 (4–6)	Reed Green Coliseum (1,606); Hattiesburg, MS
February 3, 2024; 2:00 p.m., ESPN+		Troy	W 72–63	12–9 (5–6)	Reed Green Coliseum (1,667); Hattiesburg, MS
February 7, 2024; 5:00 p.m., ESPN+		at Georgia Southern	W 62–54	13–9 (6–6)	Hanner Fieldhouse (632); Statesboro, GA
February 10, 2024*; 1:00 p.m., ESPN+		at Buffalo; MAC-SBC Challenge	L 46–62	13–10	Alumni Arena (1,756); Buffalo, NY
February 15, 2024; 5:00 p.m., ESPN+		Arkansas State	W 57–48	14–10 (7–6)	Reed Green Coliseum (4,247); Hattiesburg, MS
February 17, 2024; 12:00 p.m., ESPN+		Texas State	W 68–58	15–10 (8–6)	Reed Green Coliseum (4,425); Hattiesburg, MS
February 22, 2024; 5:00 p.m., ESPN+		at Louisiana–Monroe	L 52–57	15–11 (8–7)	Fant–Ewing Coliseum (1,086); Monroe, LA
February 24, 2024; 2:00 p.m., ESPN+		at Arkansas State	W 70–59	16–11 (9–7)	First National Bank Arena; Jonesboro, AR
February 28, 2024; 7:00 p.m., ESPN+		at Texas State	W 67–59	17–11 (10–7)	Strahan Arena (751); San Marcos, TX
March 1, 2024; 5:00 p.m., ESPN+		at Louisiana	L 57–58 ^{OT}	17–12 (10–8)	Cajundome (872); Lafayette, LA
Sun Belt tournament
March 6, 2024; 5:00 p.m., ESPN+	(6)	vs. (11) Coastal Carolina; Second round	W 70–53	18–12	Pensacola Bay Center (588); Pensacola, FL
March 8, 2024; 5:00 p.m., ESPN+	(6)	vs. (3) James Madison; Quarterfinals	L 49–77	18–13	Pensacola Bay Center (842); Pensacola, FL
WNIT
March 20, 2024*; 6:00 p.m.		UAB; First round	W 79–74	19–13	Reed Green Coliseum (1,130); Hattiesburg, MS
March 23, 2024*; 5:00 p.m.		Murray State; Second round	W 78–67 ^{OT}	20–13	Reed Green Coliseum (1,566); Hattiesburg, MS
March 27, 2024*; 6:30 p.m., ESPN+		Louisiana–Monroe; Super 16	L 71–84	20–14	Fant–Ewing Coliseum (1,257); Monroe, LA
*Non-conference game. ^{#}Rankings from AP poll. (#) Tournament seedings in parentheses. All times are in Central.

== See also ==
- 2023–24 Southern Miss Golden Eagles basketball team
