= 2023–24 Louisiana–Monroe Warhawks women's basketball team =

Intercollegiate basketball season

2023–24 Louisiana–Monroe Warhawks women's basketball

WNIT, Great 8
- Conference: Sun Belt Conference
- Record: 21–14 (10–8 Sun Belt)
- Head coach: Missy Bilderback (1st season)
- Associate head coach: Lauren Pittman
- Assistant coaches: Tatyana Lofton; Nick Long; Devin Cooper
- Home arena: Fant–Ewing Coliseum

2023–24 Sun Belt Conference women's basketball standings
	Conf.				Overall
Team	W		L	PCT	W		L	PCT
Marshall †	17	–	1	.944	26	–	7	.788
Troy	15	–	3	.833	22	–	12	.647
James Madison	13	–	5	.722	23	–	12	.657
Old Dominion	12	–	6	.667	22	–	10	.688
Louisiana–Monroe	10	–	8	.556	21	–	14	.600
Southern Miss	10	–	8	.556	20	–	14	.588
Louisiana	10	–	8	.556	17	–	14	.548
Appalachian State	9	–	9	.500	17	–	15	.531
Georgia State	9	–	9	.500	15	–	15	.500
Arkansas State	6	–	12	.333	13	–	17	.433
Coastal Carolina	5	–	13	.278	12	–	21	.364
Georgia Southern	4	–	14	.222	15	–	18	.455
Texas State	4	–	14	.222	14	–	18	.438
South Alabama	2	–	16	.111	9	–	23	.281
† 2024 Sun Belt tournament winner

The 2023–24 Louisiana–Monroe Warhawks women's basketball team represented the University of Louisiana at Monroe during the 2023–24 NCAA Division I women's basketball season. The Warhawks, led by first-year head coach Missy Bilderback, played all home games at the Fant–Ewing Coliseum along with the Louisiana–Monroe Warhawks men's basketball team. They were members of the Sun Belt Conference.

== Previous season ==
In their 2022–23 season, the Warhawks finished last-ranked in conference play and lost to Arkansas State in the first round of the conference tournament.

On March 30, ULM announced the hiring of former Jones College head coach Missy Bilderback.

== Roster ==
2023–24 Louisiana–Monroe Warhawks women's basketball team
Players
Coaches

Pos.	#	Name	Height	Year	Previous school	Hometown
PG	00	Olivia Knight	5 ft 3 in (1.6 m)	Jr	Jones College	Pearl, Mississippi
G	1	Chardai Watkins	5 ft 9 in (1.75 m)	So	Southern Miss	Panola, Alabama
G	2	Daisha Bradford	5 ft 8 in (1.73 m)	Sr	Clemson	Mobile, Alabama
G	3	Jakayla Johnson	5 ft 9 in (1.75 m)	Jr	Auburn	Clinton, Mississippi
G	8	Sania Wells	5 ft 7 in (1.7 m)	Sr	Auburn	Moss Point, Mississippi
G	10	Amani Brown	5 ft 5 in (1.65 m)	Sr	Western Nebraska Community College	Terre Haute, Indiana
F	11	Kyjai Miles	6 ft 1 in (1.85 m)	GS	Central Arkansas	Dallas, Texas
F	13	Rhi Ockwell	6 ft 1 in (1.85 m)	Jr	Louisiana Tech	Kilsyth, Victoria
G/F	14	Myca Trail	5 ft 10 in (1.78 m)	So	St. Louis Catholic High School	Lake Charles, Louisiana
G/F	15	Amaya Ford	5 ft 11 in (1.8 m)	Jr	Starkville High School	Starkville, Mississippi
F	21	Katlyn Manuel	6 ft 1 in (1.85 m)	Jr	Northwest High School	Lawtell, Louisiana
G	22	Lauren Gross	5 ft 9 in (1.75 m)	GS	Southern Miss	Southaven, Mississippi
G	33	Meloney Thames	5 ft 8 in (1.73 m)	Jr	Mississippi State	Choctaw, Mississippi
F	37	Brianna Harris	6 ft 0 in (1.83 m)	GS	Troy	Mobile, Alabama
C	44	Sha'Miya Butler	6 ft 2 in (1.88 m)	So	West Monroe High School	West Monroe, Louisiana

Head coach

- Missy Bilderback (Pearl River CC)

Assistant coach(es)

- Lauren Pittman (Southern Miss)
- Tatyana Lofton (Tulane)
- Nick Long (Louisiana–Monroe)
- Devin Cooper (Jones)

Legend

- (C) Team captain
- (S) Suspended
- (I) Ineligible
- (W) Walk-on
- Injured
- Current redshirt

Roster
Last update: June 4, 2024

== Schedule and results ==
Date time, TV	Rank^{#}	Opponent^{#}	Result	Record	Site city, state
Non-conference regular season
November 7, 2023*; 7:00 p.m., SECN+		at Arkansas	L 76–81	0–1	Bud Walton Arena (2,630); Fayetteville, AR
November 11, 2023*; 7:00 p.m., ESPN+		Miami (OH); MAC-SBC Challenge	W 78–62	1–1	Fant–Ewing Coliseum (909); Monroe, LA
November 16, 2023*; 4:00 p.m.		vs. Milwaukee; McNeese MTE	W 73–67	2–1	The Legacy Center (127); Lake Charles, LA
November 17, 2023*; 4:00 p.m.		vs. Mississippi Valley State; McNeese MTE	W 73–62	3–1	The Legacy Center (150); Lake Charles, LA
November 18, 2023*; 4:00 p.m.		at McNeese; McNeese MTE	W 87–53	4–1	The Legacy Center (1,702); Lake Charles, LA
November 21, 2023*; 6:30 p.m., ESPN+		Louisiana Christian	W 107–53	5–1	Fant–Ewing Coliseum (263); Monroe, LA
November 29, 2023*; 6:00 p.m., ESPN+		at Louisiana Tech	W 60–52	6–1	Thomas Assembly Center (1,744); Ruston, LA
December 5, 2023*; 12:00 p.m., ESPN+		Champion Christian	W 101–38	7–1	Fant–Ewing Coliseum (2,069); Monroe, LA
December 12, 2023*; 6:30 p.m., ESPN+		Northwestern State	W 76–60	8–1	Fant–Ewing Coliseum (247); Monroe, LA
December 17, 2023*; 12:00 p.m., SECN		at Alabama	L 54–70	8–2	Coleman Coliseum (2,188); Tuscaloosa, AL
December 21, 2023*; 4:00 p.m.		at California	L 55–79	8–3	Haas Pavilion (617); Berkeley, CA
Sun Belt regular season
December 30, 2023; 2:00 p.m., ESPN+		James Madison	L 79–85	8–4 (0–1)	Fant–Ewing Coliseum (550); Monroe, LA
January 4, 2024; 5:30 p.m., ESPN+		at Georgia State	W 82–65	9–4 (1–1)	Georgia State Convocation Center (743); Atlanta, GA
January 6, 2024; 1:00 p.m., ESPN+		at Georgia Southern	L 66–69	9–5 (1–2)	Hanner Fieldhouse (643); Statesboro, GA
January 11, 2024; 5:00 p.m., ESPN+		South Alabama	W 67–51	10–5 (2–2)	Fant–Ewing Coliseum (1,007); Monroe, LA
January 13, 2024; 12:00 p.m., ESPN+		Texas State	W 73–63	11–5 (3–2)	Fant–Ewing Coliseum (1,032); Monroe, LA
January 18, 2024; 6:00 p.m., ESPN+		at Louisiana	W 65–59	12–5 (4–2)	Cajundome (619); Lafayette, LA
January 20, 2024; 12:00 p.m., ESPN+		at Southern Miss	W 70–58	13–5 (5–2)	Reed Green Coliseum (5,587); Hattiesburg, MS
January 25, 2024; 5:00 p.m., ESPN+		Arkansas State	W 84–76	14–5 (6–2)	Fant–Ewing Coliseum (1,432); Monroe, LA
January 27, 2024; 12:00 p.m., ESPN+		Coastal Carolina	W 71–68	15–5 (7–2)	Fant–Ewing Coliseum (1,189); Monroe, LA
February 1, 2024; 6:30 p.m., ESPN+		Troy	L 83–94	15–6 (7–3)	Fant–Ewing Coliseum (3,147); Monroe, LA
February 3, 2024; 2:00 p.m., ESPN+		Louisiana	L 52–73	15–7 (7–4)	Fant–Ewing Coliseum (1,481); Monroe, LA
February 7, 2024; 6:30 p.m., ESPN+		at Appalachian State	L 71–78	15–8 (7–5)	Holmes Convocation Center (342); Boone, NC
February 10, 2024*; 1:00 p.m., ESPN+		at Toledo; MAC-SBC Challenge	L 57–72	15–9	Savage Arena (4,027); Toledo, OH
February 15, 2024; 5:00 p.m., ESPN+		at South Alabama	W 68–60	16–9 (8–5)	Mitchell Center; Mobile, AL
February 17, 2024; 2:00 p.m., ESPN+		at Troy	L 77–81	16–10 (8–6)	Trojan Arena (3,213); Troy, AL
February 22, 2024; 5:00 p.m., ESPN+		Southern Miss	W 57–52	17–10 (9–6)	Fant–Ewing Coliseum (1,086); Monroe, LA
February 24, 2024; 12:00 p.m., ESPN+		Marshall	L 90–99	17–11 (9–7)	Fant–Ewing Coliseum (1,201); Monroe, LA
February 27, 2024; 7:00 p.m., ESPN+		at Arkansas State	W 69–60	18–11 (10–7)	First National Bank Arena (893); Jonesboro, AR
March 1, 2024; 5:00 p.m., ESPN+		at Texas State	L 73–76	18–12 (10–8)	Strahan Arena; San Marcos, TX
Sun Belt tournament
March 6, 2024; 2:00 p.m., ESPN+	(5)	vs. (12) Georgia Southern; Second Round	W 78–57	19–12	Pensacola Bay Center (902); Pensacola, FL
March 8, 2024; 2:00 p.m., ESPN+	(5)	vs. (4) Old Dominion; Quarterfinals	L 64–67	19–13	Pensacola Bay Center (785); Pensacola, FL
WNIT
March 25, 2024*; 6:30 p.m., ESPN+		Grambling State; Second Round	W 102–76	20–13	Fant–Ewing Coliseum (2,805); Monroe, LA
March 27, 2024*; 6:30 p.m., ESPN+		Southern Miss; Super Sixteen	W 84–71	21–13	Fant–Ewing Coliseum (1,257); Monroe, LA
April 1, 2024*; 7:00 p.m., ESPN+		at Troy; Great 8	L 75–89	21–14	Trojan Arena (2,397); Troy, AL
*Non-conference game. ^{#}Rankings from AP Poll. (#) Tournament seedings in parentheses. All times are in Central Time.

- Source: Louisiana–Monroe Athletics

== See also ==
- 2023–24 Louisiana–Monroe Warhawks men's basketball team
