= 2023–24 Troy Trojans women's basketball team =

Intercollegiate basketball season

2023–24 Troy Trojans women's basketball

WNIT, Semifinals
- Conference: Sun Belt Conference
- Record: 22–12 (15–3 Sun Belt)
- Head coach: Chanda Rigby (12th season)
- Assistant coaches: Jennifer Graf; Chelsea Dungee; Stephanie Murphy
- Home arena: Trojan Arena

2023–24 Sun Belt Conference women's basketball standings
	Conf.				Overall
Team	W		L	PCT	W		L	PCT
Marshall †	17	–	1	.944	26	–	7	.788
Troy	15	–	3	.833	22	–	12	.647
James Madison	13	–	5	.722	23	–	12	.657
Old Dominion	12	–	6	.667	22	–	10	.688
Louisiana–Monroe	10	–	8	.556	21	–	14	.600
Southern Miss	10	–	8	.556	20	–	14	.588
Louisiana	10	–	8	.556	17	–	14	.548
Appalachian State	9	–	9	.500	17	–	15	.531
Georgia State	9	–	9	.500	15	–	15	.500
Arkansas State	6	–	12	.333	13	–	17	.433
Coastal Carolina	5	–	13	.278	12	–	21	.364
Georgia Southern	4	–	14	.222	15	–	18	.455
Texas State	4	–	14	.222	14	–	18	.438
South Alabama	2	–	16	.111	9	–	23	.281
† 2024 Sun Belt tournament winner

The 2023–24 Troy Trojans women's basketball team represented Troy University during the 2023–24 NCAA Division I women's basketball season. The basketball team, led by twelfth-year head coach Chanda Rigby, played all home games at the Trojan Arena along with the Troy Trojans men's basketball team. They were members of the Sun Belt Conference.

== Roster ==
2023–24 Troy Trojans women's basketball team
Players
Coaches

Pos.	#	Name	Height	Year	Previous school	Hometown
G	0	Gabbi Cartagena	5 ft 8 in (1.73 m)	Jr	Jackson HS	Jackson, Georgia
F	2	Felmas Koranga	6 ft 1 in (1.85 m)	Sr	Tyler JC	Nakuru, Kenya
G	3	Makayia Hallmon	5 ft 3 in (1.6 m)	Sr	Red River HS; Louisiana	Coushatta, Louisiana
F	5	Zay Dyer	6 ft 2 in (1.88 m)	So	Maynard Jackson HS; Georgia State	Atlanta, Georgia
F	10	Tai'Sheka Porchia	6 ft 1 in (1.85 m)	Sr	Camden Fairview HS; Pensacola State	Camden, Arkansas
F	11	Ja'Mia Hollings	6 ft 2 in (1.88 m)	Sr	West Point HS; East Mississippi CC	West Point, Mississippi
G	12	Nia Daniel	5 ft 10 in (1.78 m)	Sr	Hickory Ridge HS; Alabama	Charlotte, North Carolina
G	13	Shaulana Wagner	5 ft 10 in (1.78 m)	Jr	Detroit Edison HS	Detroit, Michigan
G	22	Sharonica Hartsfield	5 ft 5 in (1.65 m)	Jr	Putnam City West HS	Oklahoma City, Oklahoma
G	23	Shaniah Nunn	6 ft 0 in (1.83 m)	So	Fairfield HS	Birmingham, Alabama
F	24	Sara Carvajal Caro	6 ft 3 in (1.91 m)	Jr	IES Macarena de Sevilla; Monroe College	Sevilla, Spain
G	32	Leilani Augmon	5 ft 11 in (1.8 m)	Jr	Silver Creek HS; Arkansas State	San Jose, California
G	35	Leilani Guion	5 ft 10 in (1.78 m)	Jr	Boone HS; Eastern Florida State	Orlando, Florida

Head coach

- Chanda Rigby (Nova Southeastern)

Assistant coach(es)

- Jennifer Graf (Northwestern State)
- Chelsea Dungee (Arkansas)
- Stephanie Murphy (Mississippi)

Legend

- (C) Team captain
- (S) Suspended
- (I) Ineligible
- (W) Walk-on
- Injured
- Current redshirt

Roster

== Schedule and results ==
Date time, TV	Rank^{#}	Opponent^{#}	Result	Record	High points	High rebounds	High assists	Site city, state
Non-conference regular season
November 11, 2023*; 3:30 p.m., ESPN+		Ball State; SBC-MAC Challenge	L 71–86	0–1	18 – Hollings	9 – Dyer	10 – Hartsfield	Trojan Arena (2,126); Troy, AL
November 14, 2023*; 5:15 p.m., ESPN+		Samford	L 61–65	0–2	17 – Hollings	12 – Porchia	5 – Wagner	Trojan Arena (1,721); Troy, AL
November 19, 2023*; 1:00 p.m., SECN+		at No. 15 Tennessee	L 73–100	0–3	19 – Daniel	8 – Porchia	7 – Wagner	Thompson–Boling Arena (7,782); Knoxville, TN
November 29, 2023*; 6:00 p.m., ESPN+		Belmont	L 68–72	0–4	13 – Hollings	9 – Porchia	5 – Hartsfield	Trojan Arena (1,473); Troy, AL
December 2, 2023*; 2:00 p.m., ESPN+		at Memphis	L 88–100	0–5	17 – Daniel	10 – Dyer	4 – Wagner	Elma Roane Fieldhouse (1,084); Memphis, TN
December 6, 2023*; 10:00 a.m., SECN+		at Georgia	L 70–86	0–6	19 – Daniel	8 – TEAM	5 – Hallmon	Stegeman Coliseum (4,221); Athens, GA
December 9, 2023*; 3:30 p.m., ESPN+		UT Martin	W 71–59	1–6	15 – Daniel	8 – Dyer	5 – Wagner	Trojan Arena (1,484); Troy, AL
December 17, 2023*; 12:00 p.m., ESPN+		at Iowa State	L 68–105	1–7	18 – Hallmon	6 – Porchia	4 – Wagner	Hilton Coliseum (9,089); Ames, IA
December 20, 2023*; 3:30 p.m.		vs. Stephen F. Austin; Austin Peay Tournament	W 98–78	2–7	21 – Daniel	6 – Porchia	5 – Hartsfield	F&M Bank Arena (1,548); Clarksville, TN
December 21, 2023*; 12:00 p.m.		vs. New Mexico State; Austin Peay Tournament	W 81–66	3–7	30 – Hallmon	7 – Porchia	4 – Wagner	F&M Bank Arena; Clarksville, TN
Sun Belt regular season
December 31, 2023; 1:00 p.m., ESPN+		Georgia State	L 89–90 ^{OT}	3–8 (0–1)	27 – Hollings	13 – Hollings	5 – Augmon	Trojan Arena (1,887); Troy, AL
January 4, 2024; 5:00 p.m., ESPN+		at Georgia Southern	W 74–71	4–8 (1–1)	24 – Porchia	15 – Dyer	8 – Wagner	Hanner Fieldhouse (515); Statesboro, GA
January 6, 2024; 12:00 p.m., ESPN+		at Coastal Carolina	W 86–80	5–8 (2–1)	22 – Hallmon	11 – Tied	8 – Wagner	HTC Center (565); Conway, SC
January 10, 2024; 5:15 p.m., ESPN+		Louisiana	W 90–44	6–8 (3–1)	18 – Dyer	10 – Porchia	7 – Wagner	Trojan Arena (2,345); Troy, AL
January 13, 2024; 2:00 p.m., ESPN+		James Madison	W 87–74	7–8 (4–1)	27 – Hallmon	14 – Hollings	4 – Tied	Trojan Arena (3,333); Troy, AL
January 18, 2024; 7:00 p.m., ESPN+		at Texas State	W 92–85	8–8 (5–1)	18 – Hollings	10 – Wagner	7 – Hartsfield	Strahan Arena (691); San Marcos, TX
January 20, 2024; 2:00 p.m., ESPN+		at Louisiana	W 65–57	9–8 (6–1)	23 – Daniel	9 – Porch	4 – Daniel	Cajundome (611); Lafayette, LA
January 25, 2024; 6:00 p.m., ESPN+		Southern Miss	W 77–70	10–8 (7–1)	25 – Porchia	15 – Hollings	5 – Wagner	Trojan Arena (1,567); Troy, AL
January 27, 2024; 2:00 p.m., ESPN+		Arkansas State	W 91–84 ^{OT}	11–8 (8–1)	35 – Porchia	17 – Porchia	6 – Wagner	Trojan Arena (4,211); Troy, AL
February 1, 2024; 6:30 p.m., ESPN+		at Louisiana–Monroe	W 94–83	12–8 (9–1)	27 – Daniel	16 – Porchia	4 – Wagner	Fant–Ewing Coliseum (3,147); Monroe, LA
February 3, 2024; 2:00 p.m., ESPN+		at Southern Miss	L 63–72	12–9 (9–2)	14 – Hallmon	11 – Wagner	5 – Wagner	Reed Green Coliseum (1,667); Hattiesburg, MS
February 7, 2024; 5:30 p.m., ESPN+		at Old Dominion	L 59–63	12–10 (9–3)	16 – Hollings	9 – Hollings	2 – Hallmon	Chartway Arena (2,685); Norfolk, VA
February 10, 2024*; 1:00 p.m., ESPN+		at Bowling Green; SBC-MAC Challenge	W 88–78	13–10	28 – Hollings	12 – Wagner	8 – Wagner	Stroh Center (1,916); Bowling Green, OH
February 15, 2024; 5:15 p.m., ESPN+		Texas State	W 85–69	14–10 (10–3)	26 – Hollings	13 – Dyer	4 – Wagner	Trojan Arena (2,513); Troy, AL
February 17, 2024; 2:00 p.m., ESPN+		Louisiana–Monroe	W 81–77	15–10 (11–3)	20 – Porchia	14 – Porchia	7 – Hartsfield	Trojan Arena (3,213); Troy, AL
February 21, 2024; 6:00 p.m., ESPN+		at Arkansas State	W 77–65	16–10 (12–3)	15 – Hallmon	11 – Porchia	4 – Hartsfield	First National Bank Arena (853); Jonesboro, AR
February 24, 2024; 2:00 p.m., ESPN+		at South Alabama	W 88–79	17–10 (13–3)	21 – Daniel	12 – Porchia	3 – Augmon	Mitchell Center (358); Mobile, AL
February 28, 2024; 6:00 p.m., ESPN+		Appalachian State	W 102–69	18–10 (14–3)	20 – Dyer	17 – Dyer	8 – Wagner	Trojan Arena (2,574); Troy, AL
March 1, 2024; 6:00 p.m., ESPN+		South Alabama	W 108–71	19–10 (15–3)	21 – Hallmon	10 – Hollings	5 – Tied	Trojan Arena (2,796); Troy, AL
Sun Belt tournament
March 8, 2024; 7:30 p.m., ESPN+	(2)	vs. (7) Louisiana; Quarterfinals	L 65–67	19–11	23 – Hollings	12 – Hollings	4 – Hartsfield	Pensacola Bay Center (1,136); Pensacola, FL
WNIT
March 25, 2024*; 6:00 p.m., ESPN+		FIU; Second Round	W 92–62	20–11	30 – Hollings	10 – Hollings	5 – Tied	Trojan Arena (2,196); Troy, AL
March 29, 2024*; 6:00 p.m., FloSports		at North Carolina A&T; Super 16	W 92–62	21–11	21 – Hallmon	10 – Hollings	8 – Wagner	Corbett Sports Center (3,712); Greensboro, NC
April 1, 2024*; 6:00 p.m.		Louisiana–Monroe; Great 8	W 89–75	22–11	22 – Hollings	16 – Hollings	8 – Wagner	Trojan Arena (2,397); Troy, AL
April 3, 2024*; 6:00 p.m., ESPN+		Minnesota; Fab 4	L 69–74	22–12	25 – Hollings	12 – Hollings	3 – Tied	Trojan Arena (4,333); Troy, AL
*Non-conference game. ^{#}Rankings from AP Poll. (#) Tournament seedings in parentheses. All times are in Central Time.

== See also ==
- 2023–24 Troy Trojans men's basketball team
