= 2023–24 Coastal Carolina Chanticleers women's basketball team =

Intercollegiate basketball season

2023–24 Coastal Carolina Chanticleers women's basketball
- Conference: Sun Belt Conference
- Record: 12–21 (5–13 Sun Belt)
- Head coach: Kevin Pederson (2nd season)
- Assistant coaches: DeCole Shoemate Robertson; Darius Carter; Tatum Burstrom
- Home arena: HTC Center

2023–24 Sun Belt Conference women's basketball standings
	Conf.				Overall
Team	W		L	PCT	W		L	PCT
Marshall †	17	–	1	.944	26	–	7	.788
Troy	15	–	3	.833	22	–	12	.647
James Madison	13	–	5	.722	23	–	12	.657
Old Dominion	12	–	6	.667	22	–	10	.688
Louisiana–Monroe	10	–	8	.556	21	–	14	.600
Southern Miss	10	–	8	.556	20	–	14	.588
Louisiana	10	–	8	.556	17	–	14	.548
Appalachian State	9	–	9	.500	17	–	15	.531
Georgia State	9	–	9	.500	15	–	15	.500
Arkansas State	6	–	12	.333	13	–	17	.433
Coastal Carolina	5	–	13	.278	12	–	21	.364
Georgia Southern	4	–	14	.222	15	–	18	.455
Texas State	4	–	14	.222	14	–	18	.438
South Alabama	2	–	16	.111	9	–	23	.281
† 2024 Sun Belt tournament winner

The 2023–24 Coastal Carolina Chanticleers women's basketball team represented Coastal Carolina University during the 2023–24 NCAA Division I women's basketball season. The team, led by second-year head coach Kevin Pederson, played all home games at the HTC Center in Conway, South Carolina, along with the men's basketball team. They were members of the Sun Belt Conference.

== Roster ==
2023–24 Coastal Carolina Chanticleers women's basketball team
Players
Coaches

Pos.	#	Name	Height	Year	Previous school	Hometown
G	0	Tiara Abron	5 ft 8 in (1.73 m)	Jr	Senatobia HS; Coahoma CC	Senatobia, MS
F	1	Jaylen Ponder	5 ft 11 in (1.8 m)	Jr	Blanche Ely HS; St. Petersburg	Pompano, FL
G	2	Kendahl Spearman	5 ft 7 in (1.7 m)	Fr	Legacy Charter	Greenwood, SC
G	3	Anaya Barney	5 ft 10 in (1.78 m)	RS So	Cedar Falls HS; Northern Iowa	Cedar Falls, IA
G	4	Arin Freeman	5 ft 7 in (1.7 m)	Jr	North Little Rock HS	Little Rock, AR
G	5	Deaja Richardson	5 ft 9 in (1.75 m)	Sr	Westridge Academy; Tennessee State	Kernersville, NC
G	7	Darby Grigg	5 ft 7 in (1.7 m)	Fr	Northwestern HS	Rock Hill, SC
G	10	Dalanna Carter	5 ft 6 in (1.68 m)	Fr	Barbers Hill HS	Beach City, TX
F/C	20	Riley Stack	6 ft 4 in (1.93 m)	Fr	Wren HS	Piedmont, SC
F	21	Makaila Cange	5 ft 11 in (1.8 m)	Sr	New Manchester HS; Lander	Douglasville, GA
F	23	Zaria Hurston	5 ft 10 in (1.78 m)	So	Norcross HS; DePaul	Decatur, GA
F/C	31	Arielle-Vadrelle Belinga	6 ft 0 in (1.83 m)	Jr	Sandy Creek HS	Riverdale, GA
F	32	Alancia Ramsey	6 ft 0 in (1.83 m)	Fr	St. Thomas Aquinas HS	Delray Beach, FL
G	33	Maelyn McNealy	5 ft 8 in (1.73 m)	Fr	Farragut HS	Knoxville, TN

Head coach

- Kevin Pederson (Clemson)

Assistant coach(es)

- DeCole Shoemate Robertson (Liberty)
- Darius Carter (Tusculum)
- Tatum Burstrom (Carson–Newman)

Legend

- (C) Team captain
- (S) Suspended
- (I) Ineligible
- (W) Walk-on
- Injured
- Current redshirt

Roster
Last update: August 22, 2024

== Schedule and results ==
Date time, TV	Rank^{#}	Opponent^{#}	Result	Record	High points	High rebounds	High assists	Site city, state
Non-conference regular season
November 6, 2023*; 11:00 a.m., ACCNX		at Georgia Tech	L 53–83	0–1	15 – Richardson	10 – Ramsey	3 – Richardson	McCamish Pavilion (4,963); Atlanta, GA
November 9, 2023*; 7:00 p.m., ACCNX		at Duke	L 42–88	0–2	12 – Richardson	11 – Ramsey	4 – Cange	Cameron Indoor Stadium (1,027); Durham, NC
November 15, 2023*; 6:30 p.m.		at South Carolina State	W 73–61	1–2	29 – Richardson	11 – Cange	3 – tied	SHM Memorial Center (312); Orangeburg, SC
November 18, 2023*; 2:00 p.m., ESPN+		at Furman	W 78–72	2–2	15 – Freeman	11 – TEAM	5 – Carter	Timmons Arena (227); Greenville, SC
November 22, 2023*; 4:00 p.m., ESPN+		Charleston Southern	W 78–60	3–2	15 – Carter	9 – tied	5 – Freeman	HTC Center (496); Conway, SC
November 26, 2023*; 2:00 p.m., FloSports		at UNC Wilmington	W 73–59	4–2	24 – Cange	9 – Ramsey	3 – tied	Trask Coliseum (515); Wilmington, NC
November 29, 2023*; 7:00 p.m., ESPN+		at UNC Greensboro	L 59–65	4–3	17 – Cange	6 – Freeman	4 – Abron	Fleming Gymnasium (302); Greensboro, NC
December 2, 2023*; 1:00 p.m., ESPN+		Charleston	L 83–84 ^{OT}	4–4	23 – tied	12 – Cange	4 – tied	HTC Center (565); Conway, SC
December 6, 2023*; 12:30 p.m., SECN+		at Alabama	L 46–88	4–5	15 – Richardson	8 – Cange	2 – Cange	Coleman Coliseum (1,925); Tuscaloosa, AL
December 10, 2023*; 2:00 p.m., ESPN+		UNC Pembroke	W 73–49	5–5	28 – Richardson	10 – Cange	3 – Richardson	HTC Center (506); Conway, SC
December 17, 2023*; 2:00 p.m., ESPN+		at Jacksonville State	L 72–84	5–6	22 – Richardson	6 – tied	5 – Freeman	Pete Mathews Coliseum (1,012); Jacksonville, AL
December 20, 2023*; 7:00 p.m., Baller TV		vs. Chattanooga; Cherokee Invitational	W 53–49	6–6	10 – tied	12 – Cange	2 – Hurston	Harrah's Cherokee (1,036); Cherokee, NC
December 21, 2023*; 9:30 a.m., Baller TV		vs. Michigan State; Cherokee Invitational	L 66–105	6–7	13 – Freeman	8 – Ramsey	2 – Freeman	Harrah's Cherokee (723); Cherokee, NC
Sun Belt regular season
December 30, 2023; 2:00 p.m., ESPN+		at Arkansas State	L 73–81	6–8 (0–1)	17 – Freeman	11 – Cange	6 – Freeman	First National Bank Arena (952); Jonesboro, AR
January 3, 2024; 6:00 p.m., ESPN+		Southern Miss	W 88–71	7–8 (1–1)	22 – Cange	11 – Cange	5 – Freeman	HTC Center (331); Conway, SC
January 6, 2024; 1:00 p.m., ESPN+		Troy	L 80–86	7–9 (1–2)	17 – Cange	9 – Cange	7 – Freeman	HTC Center (565); Conway, SC
January 10, 2024; 6:00 p.m., ESPN+		Old Dominion	L 57–71	7–10 (1–3)	20 – Freeman	8 – Freeman	2 – tied	HTC Center (555); Conway, SC
January 13, 2024; 1:00 p.m., ESPN+		Marshall	L 60–72	7–11 (1–4)	13 – Cange	13 – Cange	5 – Cange	HTC Center (859); Conway, SC
January 18, 2024; 6:30 p.m., ESPN+		at Appalachian State	L 63–73	7–12 (1–5)	20 – Ramsey	16 – Cange	2 – Richardson	Holmes Center (467); Boone, NC
January 20, 2024; 1:00 p.m., ESPN+		at Marshall	L 85–97	7–13 (1–6)	26 – Richardson	9 – Cange	4 – tied	Cam Henderson Center (2,219); Huntington, WV
January 25, 2024; 6:00 p.m., ESPN+		at Louisiana	L 51–67	7–14 (1–7)	14 – Richardson	9 – Freeman	3 – Richardson	Cajundome (648); Lafayette, LA
January 27, 2024; 1:00 p.m., ESPN+		at Louisiana–Monroe	L 68–71	7–15 (1–8)	17 – Richardson	11 – Ramsey	6 – Freeman	Fant–Ewing Coliseum (1,189); Monroe, LA
February 1, 2024; 6:00 p.m., ESPN+		Georgia Southern	W 73–55	8–15 (2–8)	20 – Cange	12 – Cange	3 – tied	HTC Center (681); Conway, SC
February 3, 2024; 1:00 p.m., ESPN+		Appalachian State	L 70–80	8–16 (2–9)	25 – Freeman	10 – Cange	3 – Freeman	HTC Center (670); Conway, SC
February 7, 2024; 6:00 p.m., ESPN+		Texas State	L 49–52	8–17 (2–10)	11 – tied	6 – tied	6 – Freeman	HTC Center (878); Conway, SC
February 14, 2024; 6:30 p.m., ESPN+		at Old Dominion	L 58–65	8–18 (2–11)	21 – Freeman	8 – Ramsey	3 – tied	Chartway Arena (1,710); Norfolk, VA
February 17, 2024; 2:00 p.m., ESPN+		at James Madison	L 60–73	8–19 (2–12)	18 – tied	9 – Ramsey	4 – Stack	Atlantic Union Bank Center (2,622); Harrisonburg, VA
February 22, 2024; 6:30 p.m., ESPN+		at Georgia State	W 60–52	9–19 (3–12)	16 – Freeman	12 – Cange	3 – Freeman	GSU Convocation Center (927); Atlanta, GA
February 24, 2024; 2:00 p.m., ESPN+		at Georgia Southern	W 87–81	10–19 (4–12)	24 – Cange	9 – Cange	4 – tied	Hanner Fieldhouse (1,727); Statesboro, GA
February 28, 2024; 5:00 p.m., ESPN+		James Madison	L 60–69	10–20 (4–13)	19 – Cange	8 – Cange	5 – Richardson	HTC Center (551); Conway, SC
March 1, 2024; 5:00 p.m., ESPN+		Georgia State	W 74–62	11–20 (5–13)	22 – Richardson	9 – Ramsey	10 – Freeman	HTC Center (461); Conway, SC
Sun Belt tournament
March 5, 2024; 3:00 p.m., ESPN+	(11)	vs. (14) South Alabama; First round	W 79–60	12–20	26 – Freeman	12 – Ramsey	6 – Stack	Pensacola Bay Center (453); Pensacola, FL
March 6, 2024; 6:00 p.m., ESPN+	(11)	vs. (6) Southern Miss; Second round	L 53–70	12–21	13 – Freeman	9 – tied	3 – tied	Pensacola Bay Center (588); Pensacola, FL
*Non-conference game. ^{#}Rankings from AP poll. (#) Tournament seedings in parentheses. All times are in Eastern.

== See also ==
- 2023–24 Coastal Carolina Chanticleers men's basketball team
