= 2023–24 Texas State Bobcats women's basketball team =

Intercollegiate basketball season

2023–24 Texas State Bobcats women's basketball
- Conference: Sun Belt Conference
- Record: 14–18 (4–14 Sun Belt)
- Head coach: Zenarae Antoine (13th season)
- Assistant coaches: Nathan Teymer; Jericka Jenkins; Paige Love
- Home arena: Strahan Arena

2023–24 Sun Belt Conference women's basketball standings
	Conf.				Overall
Team	W		L	PCT	W		L	PCT
Marshall †	17	–	1	.944	26	–	7	.788
Troy	15	–	3	.833	22	–	12	.647
James Madison	13	–	5	.722	23	–	12	.657
Old Dominion	12	–	6	.667	22	–	10	.688
Louisiana–Monroe	10	–	8	.556	21	–	14	.600
Southern Miss	10	–	8	.556	20	–	14	.588
Louisiana	10	–	8	.556	17	–	14	.548
Appalachian State	9	–	9	.500	17	–	15	.531
Georgia State	9	–	9	.500	15	–	15	.500
Arkansas State	6	–	12	.333	13	–	17	.433
Coastal Carolina	5	–	13	.278	12	–	21	.364
Georgia Southern	4	–	14	.222	15	–	18	.455
Texas State	4	–	14	.222	14	–	18	.438
South Alabama	2	–	16	.111	9	–	23	.281
† 2024 Sun Belt tournament winner

The 2023–24 Texas State Bobcats women's basketball team represented Texas State University during the 2023–24 NCAA Division I women's basketball season. The basketball team, led by 13th-year head coach Zenarae Antoine, played all home games at the Strahan Arena in San Marcos, Texas along with the Texas State Bobcats men's basketball team. They were members of the Sun Belt Conference.

The Bobcats finished the season 14–18, 4–14 in the Sun Belt play, to finish in a tie for twelfth place. They were defeated by 12th-seeded Georgia Southern in the first round of the Sun Belt tournament.

== Roster ==
2023–24 Texas State Bobcats women's basketball team
Players
Coaches

Pos.	#	Name	Height	Year	Previous school	Hometown
G	0	Emilia Steele	5 ft 10 in (1.78 m)	Fr	Colleyville Heritage HS	Euless, TX
G	1	Ja'Niah Henson	5 ft 3 in (1.6 m)	Sr	Roland Park Country HS; Morgan State	Baltimore, MD
G	2	Gara Beth Self	5 ft 8 in (1.73 m)	Sr	Ingomar HS; Louisiana–Monroe	New Albany, MS
G	3	Crystal Smith	5 ft 9 in (1.75 m)	Jr	Tompkins HS; Blinn College	Bastrop, LA
G	4	Sierra Dickson	5 ft 7 in (1.7 m)	Sr	Hebron HS	Carrollton, TX
F	5	Morgan Hill	6 ft 3 in (1.91 m)	Sr	Cypress Creek HS; Louisiana–Monroe	Houston, TX
PG	10	Kennedy Claybrooks	5 ft 6 in (1.68 m)	So	Bartlett HS	Cordova, TN
F	11	Jaylin Foster	6 ft 0 in (1.83 m)	Jr	Byron P. Steele HS; Western Kentucky	Austin, TX
F	12	Julia Coleman	6 ft 0 in (1.83 m)	Fr	Westminster Christian Academy	St. Louis, MO
G	24	Timia Jefferson	5 ft 9 in (1.75 m)	Sr	Mansfield Timberview HS; Houston Baptist	Mansfield, TX
F	31	Tiffany Tullis	5 ft 11 in (1.8 m)	Jr	Cornerstone Christian HS; Blinn College	San Antonio, TX
F	40	Nicole Leff	6 ft 1 in (1.85 m)	Sr	Cedar Park HS	Cedar Park, TX

Head coach

- Zenarae Antoine (Ohio)

Assistant coach(es)

- Nathan Teymer (Georgia Southwestern State)
- Jericka Jenkins (Texas State)
- Paige Love (Texas State)

Legend

- (C) Team captain
- (S) Suspended
- (I) Ineligible
- (W) Walk-on
- Injured
- Current redshirt

Roster
Last update: April 3, 2025

== Schedule and results ==
Date time, TV	Rank^{#}	Opponent^{#}	Result	Record	Site city, state
Non-conference regular season
November 6, 2023*; 7:00 p.m., ESPN+		Arlington Baptist	W 90–48	1–0	Strahan Arena (849); San Marcos, TX
November 11, 2023*; 2:00 p.m., ESPN+		Bowling Green; MAC–SBC Challenge	W 74–48	2–0	Strahan Arena (823); San Marcos, TX
November 17, 2023*; 5:00 p.m., ESPN+		UT Rio Grande Valley	W 66–63	3–0	Strahan Arena; San Marcos, TX
November 21, 2023*; 7:00 p.m., ESPN+		Sam Houston	L 62–66	3–1	Strahan Arena (782); San Marcos, TX
November 26, 2023*; 1:00 p.m., ESPN+		at Texas A&M–Corpus Christi	L 52–60	3–2	American Bank Center (781); Corpus Christi, TX
November 30, 2023*; 5:00 p.m., ESPN+		at UTSA; Battle of I-35	W 65–57 ^{OT}	4–2	Convocation Center (899); San Antonio, TX
December 3, 2023*; 3:00 p.m.		UNT Dallas	W 79–41	5–2	Strahan Arena (691); San Marcos, TX
December 9, 2023*; 2:00 p.m.		at Oklahoma State	L 52–67	5–3	Gallagher-Iba Arena (1,753); Stillwater, OK
December 14, 2023*; 7:00 p.m., ESPN+		Denver	W 72–46	6–3	Strahan Arena (771); San Marcos, TX
December 18, 2023*; 11:00 a.m., ESPN+		at FIU; FIU Christmas Tournament	W 67–61	7–3	Ocean Bank Convocation Center (331); Miami, FL
December 19, 2023*; 1:00 p.m.		vs. Chicago State; FIU Christmas Tournament	W 84–76	8–3	Ocean Bank Convocation Center (321); Miami, FL
December 20, 2023*; 1:00 p.m.		vs. Alabama A&M; FIU Christmas Tournament	W 63–52	9–3	Ocean Bank Convocation Center; Miami, FL
Sun Belt regular season
December 30, 2023; 2:00 p.m., ESPN+		Georgia Southern	L 69–70	9–4 (0–1)	Strahan Arena (851); San Marcos, TX
January 4, 2024; 5:30 p.m., ESPN+		at Appalachian State	W 67–58	10–4 (1–1)	Holmes Center (363); Boone, NC
January 6, 2024; 1:00 p.m., ESPN+		at Georgia State	L 55–64	10–5 (1–2)	GSU Convocation Center (765); Atlanta, GA
January 11, 2024; 5:00 p.m., ESPN+		at Arkansas State	L 48–73	10–6 (1–3)	First National Bank Arena; Jonesboro, AR
January 13, 2024; 12:00 p.m., ESPN+		at Louisiana–Monroe	L 63–73	10–7 (1–4)	Fant–Ewing Coliseum (1,032); Monroe, LA
January 18, 2024; 7:00 p.m., ESPN+		Troy	L 85–92	10–8 (1–5)	Strahan Arena (691); San Marcos, TX
January 20, 2024; 2:00 p.m., ESPN+		Arkansas State	L 53–57	10–9 (1–6)	Strahan Arena (691); San Marcos, TX
January 25, 2024; 11:00 a.m., ESPN+		at South Alabama	W 63–44	11–9 (2–6)	Mitchell Center; Mobile, AL
January 27, 2024; 2:00 p.m., ESPN+		at Louisiana	L 52–59	11–10 (2–7)	Cajundome (512); Lafayette, LA
January 31, 2024; 11:00 a.m., ESPN+		Old Dominion	L 58–66	11–11 (2–8)	Strahan Arena (3,318); San Marcos, TX
February 3, 2024; 2:00 p.m., ESPN+		South Alabama	L 64–65	11–12 (2–9)	Strahan Arena; San Marcos, TX
February 7, 2024; 5:00 p.m., ESPN+		at Coastal Carolina	W 52–49	12–12 (3–9)	HTC Center (878); Conway, SC
February 10, 2024*; 12:00 p.m., ESPN+		Ohio; MAC–SBC Challenge	W 80–71	13–12	Convocation Center (619); Athens, OH
February 15, 2024; 5:15 p.m., ESPN+		at Troy	L 69–85	13–13 (3–10)	Trojan Arena (2,513); Troy, AL
February 16, 2024; 12:00 p.m., ESPN+		at Southern Miss	L 58–68	13–14 (3–11)	Reed Green Coliseum; Hattiesburg, MS
February 21, 2024; 7:00 p.m., ESPN+		Marshall	L 59–85	13–15 (3–12)	Strahan Arena (1,064); San Marcos, TX
February 24, 2024; 2:00 p.m., ESPN+		Louisiana	L 50–55	13–16 (3–13)	Strahan Arena (903); San Marcos, TX
February 28, 2024; 7:00 p.m., ESPN+		Southern Miss	L 59–67	13–17 (3–14)	Strahan Arena (751); San Marcos, TX
March 1, 2024; 5:00 p.m., ESPN+		Louisiana–Monroe	W 76–73	14–17 (4–14)	Strahan Arena; San Marcos, TX
Sun Belt tournament
March 5, 2024; 11:30 a.m., ESPN+	(13)	vs. (12) Georgia Southern; First round	L 70–72	14–18	Pensacola Bay Center (380); Pensacola, FL
*Non-conference game. ^{#}Rankings from AP poll. (#) Tournament seedings in parentheses. All times are in Central.

== See also ==
- 2023–24 Texas State Bobcats men's basketball team
