= 2023–24 Arkansas State Red Wolves women's basketball team =

Intercollegiate basketball season

2023–24 Arkansas State Red Wolves women's basketball
- Conference: Sun Belt Conference
- Record: 13–17 (6–12 Sun Belt)
- Head coach: Destinee Rogers (3rd season)
- Assistant coaches: Lizzie Nessling; Rudy Evans
- Home arena: First National Bank Arena

2023–24 Sun Belt Conference women's basketball standings
	Conf.				Overall
Team	W		L	PCT	W		L	PCT
Marshall †	17	–	1	.944	26	–	7	.788
Troy	15	–	3	.833	22	–	12	.647
James Madison	13	–	5	.722	23	–	12	.657
Old Dominion	12	–	6	.667	22	–	10	.688
Louisiana–Monroe	10	–	8	.556	21	–	14	.600
Southern Miss	10	–	8	.556	20	–	14	.588
Louisiana	10	–	8	.556	17	–	14	.548
Appalachian State	9	–	9	.500	17	–	15	.531
Georgia State	9	–	9	.500	15	–	15	.500
Arkansas State	6	–	12	.333	13	–	17	.433
Coastal Carolina	5	–	13	.278	12	–	21	.364
Georgia Southern	4	–	14	.222	15	–	18	.455
Texas State	4	–	14	.222	14	–	18	.438
South Alabama	2	–	16	.111	9	–	23	.281
† 2024 Sun Belt tournament winner

The 2023–24 Arkansas State Red Wolves women's basketball team represented Arkansas State University during the 2023–24 NCAA Division I women's basketball season. The basketball team, led by third-year head coach Destinee Rogers, played all home games at the First National Bank Arena along with the Arkansas State Red Wolves men's basketball team. They were members of the Sun Belt Conference.

== Roster ==
2023–24 Arkansas State Red Wolves women's basketball team
Players
Coaches

Pos.	#	Name	Height	Year	Previous school	Hometown
G	0	Jordan Clark	5 ft 7 in (1.7 m)	RS Jr	South Jones HS; Jones County JC	Ellisville, Mississippi
G	1	Bre Sutton	5 ft 9 in (1.75 m)	Jr	Warren Easton HS; Louisiana–Monroe	New Orleans, Louisiana
G	2	Wynter Rogers	6 ft 0 in (1.83 m)	RS So	Little Rock Christian; West Virginia	Little Rock, Arkansas
G	3	Crislyn Rose	5 ft 8 in (1.73 m)	Fr	Sachse HS	Sachse, Texas
F	4	Linay Bodden	6 ft 2 in (1.88 m)	So	St. Jean Baptiste HS	The Bronx, New York
G	7	Mailyn Wilkerson	5 ft 6 in (1.68 m)	Jr	Summer Creek HS; Trinity Valley CC	Houston, Texas
F	14	Emma Imevbore	6 ft 4 in (1.93 m)	Jr	King Henry Secondary; Lamar	London, England
G/F	15	Anna Griffin	6 ft 1 in (1.85 m)	Jr	Aurora Christian HS; Virginia	Aurora, Illinois
G	23	Izzy Higginbottom	5 ft 7 in (1.7 m)	Jr	Batesville HS; Missouri	Batesville, Arkansas
G	24	Lauryn Pendleton	5 ft 9 in (1.75 m)	Jr	Little Rock Central HS	Little Rock, Arkansas
F	25	Kendra Gillispie	6 ft 1 in (1.85 m)	Jr	Harding Charter; Baylor	Oklahoma City, Oklahoma
F	30	Kiayra Ellis	6 ft 0 in (1.83 m)	Jr	Captain Shreve HS	Shreveport, Louisiana
F/C	34	Cheyenne Forney	6 ft 3 in (1.91 m)	Sr	Colony HS; Denver	Riverside, California
F/C	42	Melodie Kapinga	6 ft 3 in (1.91 m)	Sr	MacArthur HS; UC Irvine	Arlington, Texas

Head coach

- Destinee Rogers (Central Arkansas)

Assistant coach(es)

- Lizzie Nessling (Saint Mary)
- Rudy Evans (Berea)

Legend

- (C) Team captain
- (S) Suspended
- (I) Ineligible
- (W) Walk-on
- Injured
- Current redshirt

Roster
Last update: 25 December 2023

== Schedule and results ==
Date time, TV	Rank^{#}	Opponent^{#}	Result	Record	High points	High rebounds	High assists	Site city, state
Regular season
November 6, 2023*; 6:00 p.m., SLN		at South Dakota State	L 42–55	0–1	22 – Higginbottom	8 – Rogers	2 – Rogers	Frost Arena (2,029); Brookings, SD
November 9, 2023*; 11:00 a.m., ESPN+		Northern Illinois; MAC-SBC Challenge	W 75–62	1–1	31 – Higginbottom	13 – Griffin	6 – Higginbottom	First National Bank Arena (2,685); Jonesboro, AR
November 17, 2023*; 7:00 p.m., ESPN+		Arkansas; Rivalry	L 67–82	1–2	27 – Higginbottom	11 – Gillispie	3 – Pendleton	First National Bank Arena (3,208); Jonesboro, AR
November 21, 2023*; 7:00 p.m., ESPN+		Hendrix	W 95–15	2–2	17 – Pendleton	7 – Rogers	5 – Rose	First National Bank Arena (692); Jonesboro, AR
November 28, 2023*; 5:00 p.m., ESPN+		Arkansas–Pine Bluff	W 85–65	3–2	22 – Higginbottom	10 – Rogers	4 – Rogers	First National Bank Arena (2,959); Jonesboro, AR
December 2, 2023*; 2:00 p.m., SLN		at Kansas City	L 57–62	3–3	18 – Higginbottom	11 – Gillispie	2 – Higginbottom	Municipal Auditorium (544); Kansas City, MO
December 9, 2023*; 12:00 p.m., ESPN+		Louisiana Tech	W 69–58	4–3	29 – Higginbottom	6 – Griffin	4 – Higginbottom	First National Bank Arena (2,699); Jonesboro, AR
December 14, 2023*; 7:00 p.m., ESPN+		North Alabama	W 82–78	5–3	35 – Higginbottom	10 – Rogers	6 – Pendleton	First National Bank Arena (836); Jonesboro, AR
December 17, 2023*; 2:00 p.m., ESPN+		Little Rock	W 74–59	6–3	22 – Wilkerson	10 – Kapinga	6 – Higginbottom	First National Bank Arena (1,008); Jonesboro, AR
December 21, 2023*; 2:00 p.m., ESPN+		UT Martin	L 62–67	6–4	16 – Higginbottom	6 – Rogers	6 – Pendleton	First National Bank Arena (683); Jonesboro, AR
December 30, 2023; 1:00 p.m., ESPN+		Coastal Carolina	W 81–73	7–4 (1–0)	25 – Higginbottom	12 – Pendleton	7 – Pendleton	First National Bank Arena (952); Jonesboro, AR
January 4, 2024; 6:00 p.m., ESPN+		at James Madison	L 57–64	7–5 (1–1)	18 – Higginbottom	7 – Gillispie	3 – Higginbottom	Atlantic Union Bank Center (2,182); Harrisonburg, VA
January 6, 2024; 12:00 p.m., ESPN+		at Marshall	L 51–68	7–6 (1–2)	15 – Higginbottom	9 – TEAM	2 – Tied	Cam Henderson Center (1,288); Huntington, WV
January 11, 2024; 5:00 p.m., ESPN+		Texas State	W 73–48	8–6 (2–2)	33 – Higginbottom	9 – Forney	5 – Higginbottom	First National Bank Arena (3,023); Jonesboro, AR
January 13, 2024; 12:00 p.m., ESPN+		Louisiana	L 63–64	8–7 (2–3)	15 – Tied	8 – Rogers	8 – Higginbottom	First National Bank Arena (2,681); Jonesboro, AR
January 17, 2024; 7:00 p.m., ESPN+		at South Alabama	W 78–69	9–7 (3–3)	32 – Higginbottom	7 – Tied	4 – Higginbottom	Mitchell Center (249); Mobile, AL
January 20, 2024; 2:00 p.m., ESPN+		at Texas State	W 57–53	10–7 (4–3)	20 – Higginbottom	9 – Pendleton	4 – Higginbottom	Strahan Arena (249); San Marcos, TX
January 25, 2024; 5:00 p.m., ESPN+		at Louisiana–Monroe	L 76–84	10–8 (4–4)	16 – Tied	7 – Tied	8 – Higginbottom	Fant–Ewing Coliseum (1,432); Monroe, LA
January 27, 2024; 2:00 p.m., ESPN+		at Troy	L 84–91 ^{OT}	10–9 (4–5)	34 – Higginbottom	11 – Imevbore	8 – Higginbottom	Trojan Arena (4,211); Troy, AL
January 31, 2024; 5:00 p.m., ESPN+		South Alabama	W 73–61	11–9 (5–5)	35 – Higginbottom	9 – Rogers	5 – Higginbottom	First National Bank Arena (2,032); Jonesboro, AR
February 3, 2024; 12:00 p.m., ESPN+		Old Dominion	W 76–63	12–9 (6–5)	33 – Higginbottom	8 – Rogers	5 – Higginbottom	First National Bank Arena (2,743); Jonesboro, AR
February 7, 2024; 5:30 p.m., ESPN+		at Georgia State	L 56–58	12–10 (6–6)	24 – Higginbottom	14 – Rogers	2 – Rogers	Georgia State Convocation Center (920); Atlanta, GA
February 10, 2024*; 1:00 p.m., ESPN+		at Akron; MAC-SBC Challenge	W 81–67	13–10	26 – Higginbottom	6 – Pendleton	5 – Higginbottom	James A. Rhodes Arena (813); Akron, OH
February 15, 2024; 5:00 p.m., ESPN+		at Southern Miss	L 48–57	13–11 (6–7)	11 – Rogers	11 – Griffin	2 – Griffin	Reed Green Coliseum; Hattiesburg, MS
February 17, 2024; 2:00 p.m., ESPN+		at Louisiana	L 46–59	13–12 (6–8)	14 – Higginbottom	7 – Sutton	2 – Griffin	Cajundome (709); Lafayette, LA
February 21, 2024; 7:00 p.m., ESPN+		Troy	L 65–77	13–13 (6–9)	21 – Griffin	9 – Gillispie	4 – Tied	First National Bank Arena (853); Jonesboro, AR
February 24, 2024; 12:00 p.m., ESPN+		Southern Miss	L 59–70	13–14 (6–10)	18 – Pendleton	9 – Imevbore	4 – Rogers	First National Bank Arena; Jonesboro, AR
February 27, 2024; 7:00 p.m., ESPN+		Louisiana–Monroe	L 60–69	13–15 (6–11)	13 – Pendleton	11 – Rogers	3 – Wilkerson	First National Bank Arena (893); Jonesboro, AR
March 1, 2024; 7:00 p.m., ESPN+		Appalachian State	L 57–64	13–16 (6–12)	15 – Rogers	14 – Rogers	2 – Tied	First National Bank Arena (957); Jonesboro, AR
Sun Belt tournament
March 6, 2024; 7:30 p.m., ESPN+	(10)	vs. (7) Louisiana; Second Round	L 41–54	13–17	15 – Griffin	7 – Griffin	2 – Pendleton	Pensacola Bay Center (690); Pensacola, FL
*Non-conference game. ^{#}Rankings from AP poll. (#) Tournament seedings in parentheses. All times are in Central Time.

== See also ==
- 2023–24 Arkansas State Red Wolves men's basketball team
