= 2023–24 Louisiana Ragin' Cajuns women's basketball team =

Intercollegiate basketball season

2023–24 Louisiana Ragin' Cajuns women's basketball
- Conference: Sun Belt Conference
- Record: 17–14 (10–8 Sun Belt)
- Head coach: Garry Brodhead (12th season)
- Assistant coaches: Deacon Jones; M. C. Vogt; Adrian Sanders
- Home arena: Cajundome

2023–24 Sun Belt Conference women's basketball standings
	Conf.				Overall
Team	W		L	PCT	W		L	PCT
Marshall †	17	–	1	.944	26	–	7	.788
Troy	15	–	3	.833	22	–	12	.647
James Madison	13	–	5	.722	23	–	12	.657
Old Dominion	12	–	6	.667	22	–	10	.688
Louisiana–Monroe	10	–	8	.556	21	–	14	.600
Southern Miss	10	–	8	.556	20	–	14	.588
Louisiana	10	–	8	.556	17	–	14	.548
Appalachian State	9	–	9	.500	17	–	15	.531
Georgia State	9	–	9	.500	15	–	15	.500
Arkansas State	6	–	12	.333	13	–	17	.433
Coastal Carolina	5	–	13	.278	12	–	21	.364
Georgia Southern	4	–	14	.222	15	–	18	.455
Texas State	4	–	14	.222	14	–	18	.438
South Alabama	2	–	16	.111	9	–	23	.281
† 2024 Sun Belt tournament winner

The 2023–24 Louisiana Ragin' Cajuns women's basketball team represented the University of Louisiana at Lafayette during the 2023–24 NCAA Division I women's basketball season. The Ragin' Cajuns, led by twelfth-year head coach Garry Brodhead, played all home games at the Cajundome in Lafayette, Louisiana. They were members of the Sun Belt Conference.

The Ragin' Cajuns finished the season 17–14, 10–8 in the Sun Belt play, to finish in a three-way tie for fifth place. They were defeated by third-seeded James Madison in the semifinals of the Sun Belt tournament.

== Previous season ==
The Ragin' Cajuns finished the 2022–23 season 16–15, 10–8 in Sun Belt play, to finish seventh in the conference. They made it to the 2023 Sun Belt Conference women's basketball tournament where they ultimately lost to Appalachian State in the second round. They were not invited to any additional postseason play.

== Roster ==
2023–24 Louisiana Ragin' Cajuns women's basketball team
Players
Coaches

Pos.	#	Name	Height	Year	Previous school	Hometown
F	0	Ashlyn Jones	6 ft 0 in (1.83 m)	Jr	Klein Oak HS	Houston, TX
C	1	Mariah Stewart	6 ft 2 in (1.88 m)	Jr	Hancock Place HS; Mineral Area	St. Louis, MO
G	2	Brandi Williams	5 ft 6 in (1.68 m)	Sr	Barbe HS	Lake Charles, LA
G	3	Nubia Benedith	5 ft 8 in (1.73 m)	Jr	Heritage HS; North Florida	Palm Bay, FL
G	4	Lanay Wheaton	5 ft 7 in (1.7 m)	Jr	Holmes HS; Old Dominion	Hope, AR
F	5	Tamera Johnson	5 ft 11 in (1.8 m)	Jr	Lafayette Christian	Lafayette, LA
G	9	Dacia Jones	6 ft 0 in (1.83 m)	Fr	Lafayette Christian Academy	Lafayette, LA
G	10	Aasia Sam	5 ft 11 in (1.8 m)	Jr	LaGrange HS; Louisiana–Monroe	Lake Charles, LA
G	11	Imani Rothschild	5 ft 7 in (1.7 m)	So	Warren Easton HS	New Orleans, LA
G	13	Tamiah Robinson	5 ft 9 in (1.75 m)	Jr	West Catholic Prep HS; Labette CC; Utah State	Philadelphia, PA
F	15	Uniyah Franklin	6 ft 2 in (1.88 m)	Fr	Everglades HS	Pompano Beach, FL
G/F	21	Jasmine Matthews	5 ft 11 in (1.8 m)	Fr	East St. John HS	LaPlace, LA
G	22	Jaylyn James	5 ft 8 in (1.73 m)	So	Mandeville HS	Madisonville, LA
G	23	Alicia Blanton	5 ft 9 in (1.75 m)	So	Foster HS	Richmond, TX
G	24	Destiny Rice	5 ft 8 in (1.73 m)	Sr	North Caddo Magnet; Alabama	Shreveport, LA
G	25	Imani Ivery	5 ft 9 in (1.75 m)	So	Foster HS	Houston, TX
C	35	Wilnie Joseph	6 ft 5 in (1.96 m)	Jr	Whiteland HS; Labette CC	Greenwood, IN

Head coach

- Garry Brodhead (Louisiana)

Assistant coach(es)

- Deacon Jones (Louisiana)
- M. C. Vogt (Texas A&M)
- Adrian Sanders (Southern)

Legend

- (C) Team captain
- (S) Suspended
- (I) Ineligible
- (W) Walk-on
- Injured
- Current redshirt

Roster

== Schedule and results ==
Date time, TV	Rank^{#}	Opponent^{#}	Result	Record	High points	High rebounds	High assists	Site city, state
Non-conference regular season
November 6, 2023*; 5:00 p.m., ESPN+		Spring Hill	W 75–45	1–0	15 – Johnson	9 – Johnson	3 – Tied	Cajundome (624); Lafayette, LA
November 9, 2023*; 7:00 p.m., SECN+		at Auburn	L 54–60	1–1	16 – Rice	7 – TEAM	3 – Robinson	Neville Arena (2,225); Auburn, AL
November 12, 2023*; 4:00 p.m., ESPN+		Kent State; MAC–SBC Challenge	L 55–64	1–2	17 – Williams	10 – Robinson	2 – Robinson	Cajundome (572); Lafayette, LA
November 18, 2023*; 2:00 p.m., ESPN+		Nicholls	W 69–63 ^{OT}	2–2	17 – Tied	17 – Johnson	4 – Robinson	Cajundome (808); Lafayette, LA
Exhibition
November 21, 2023*; 6:00 p.m.		Xavier (LA)	W 64–40		11 – A. Jones	7 – Joseph	2 – Robinson	Cajundome (794); Lafayette, LA
November 27, 2023*; 6:00 p.m.		Loyola (LA)	W 76–47		10 – A. Jones	8 – Rothschild	5 – Robinson	Cajundome (646); Lafayette, LA
Non-conference regular season
December 2, 2023*; 2:00 p.m., ESPN+		at New Orleans	W 44–41	3–2	12 – Johnson	8 – Johnson	3 – Wheaton	Lakefront Arena (573); New Orleans, LA
December 10, 2023*; 2:00 p.m., SECN+		at No. 7 LSU	L 53–83	3–3	14 – Williams	5 – Williams	1 – Tied	Pete Maravich Assembly Center (10,794); Baton Rouge, LA
December 13, 2023*; 5:00 p.m., ESPN+		Lamar	L 60–63	3–4	18 – Johnson	5 – Johnson	5 – Rice	Cajundome (648); Lafayette, LA
December 17, 2023*; 4:00 p.m., ESPN+		North Texas	L 48–71	3–5	10 – Wheaton	7 – Johnson	2 – Tied	Cajundome (816); Lafayette, LA
December 19, 2023*; 11:00 a.m., ESPN+		LSU–Shreveport; Education Game	W 64–46	4–5	13 – Wheaton	7 – Rice	2 – Tied	Cajundome (3,572); Lafayette, LA
Sun Belt regular season
December 30, 2023; 1:00 p.m., ESPN+		Appalachian State	L 56–69	4–6 (0–1)	15 – Williams	4 – Tied	3 – Robinson	Cajundome (862); Lafayette, LA
January 4, 2024; 5:30 p.m., ESPN+		at Old Dominion	W 66–61	5–6 (1–1)	20 – Johnson	9 – TEAM	3 – Rice	Chartway Arena (1,745); Norfolk, VA
January 6, 2024; 12:00 p.m., ESPN+		at James Madison	L 72–77 ^{OT}	5–7 (1–2)	20 – Williams	5 – Tied	2 – Tied	Atlantic Union Bank Center (2,268); Harrisonburg, VA
January 10, 2024; 5:15 p.m., ESPN+		at Troy	L 44–90	5–8 (1–3)	8 – Tied	4 – Tied	2 – Tied	Trojan Arena (2,345); Troy, AL
January 13, 2024; 12:00 p.m., ESPN+		at Arkansas State	W 64–63	6–8 (2–3)	25 – James	8 – James	4 – Williams	First National Bank Arena; Jonesboro, AR
January 18, 2024; 6:00 p.m., ESPN+		Louisiana–Monroe	L 59–65	6–9 (2–4)	18 – Rice	7 – Franklin	3 – Johnson	Cajundome (619); Lafayette, LA
January 20, 2024; 2:00 p.m., ESPN+		Troy	L 57–65	6–10 (2–5)	16 – Williams	7 – Robinson	3 – Robinson	Cajundome (611); Lafayette, LA
January 25, 2024; 5:00 p.m., ESPN+		Coastal Carolina	W 67–51	7–10 (3–5)	16 – James	6 – Johnson	5 – Robinson	Cajundome (648); Lafayette, LA
January 27, 2024; 2:00 p.m., ESPN+		Texas State	W 59–52	8–10 (4–5)	18 – James	7 – James	2 – Tied	Cajundome (512); Lafayette, LA
February 1, 2024; 6:00 p.m., ESPN+		at Southern Miss	L 48–55	8–11 (4–6)	16 – Williams	7 – Tied	2 – Tied	Reed Green Coliseum (1,606); Hattiesburg, MS
February 3, 2024; 2:00 p.m., ESPN+		at Louisiana–Monroe	W 73–52	9–11 (5–6)	15 – Williams	7 – Rice	6 – Johnson	Fant–Ewing Coliseum (1,481); Monroe, LA
February 7, 2024; 10:00 a.m., ESPN+		at Marshall	L 42–74	9–12 (5–7)	18 – Williams	8 – TEAM	3 – Johnson	Cam Henderson Center (3,024); Huntington, WV
February 10, 2024*; 12:00 p.m., ESPN+		at Central Michigan; MAC–SBC Challenge	W 54–51	10–12	14 – Robinson	6 – Blanton	4 – Robinson	McGuirk Arena (1,260); Mount Pleasant, MI
February 15, 2024; 6:00 p.m., ESPN+		Georgia Southern	W 62–57	11–12 (6–7)	18 – Robinson	9 – Johnson	3 – Robinson	Cajundome (608); Lafayette, LA
February 17, 2024; 2:00 p.m., ESPN+		Arkansas State	W 59–46	12–12 (7–7)	17 – James	14 – Johnson	3 – Rice	Cajundome; Lafayette, LA
February 21, 2024; 7:00 p.m., ESPN+		at South Alabama	W 74–42	13–12 (8–7)	15 – James	6 – Johnson	4 – Johnson	Mitchell Center (258); Mobile, AL
February 24, 2024; 2:00 p.m., ESPN+		at Texas State	W 55–50	14–12 (9–7)	15 – Johnson	7 – Robinson	2 – Tied	Strahan Arena (903); San Marcos, TX
February 27, 2024; 6:00 p.m., ESPN+		South Alabama	L 43–46	14–13 (9–8)	13 – James	9 – Johnson	2 – Tied	Cajundome; Lafayette, LA
March 1, 2024; 5:00 p.m., ESPN+		Southern Miss	W 58–57 ^{OT}	15–13 (10–8)	20 – Williams	8 – Robinson	3 – Robinson	Cajundome (872); Lafayette, LA
Sun Belt tournament
March 6, 2024; 7:30 p.m., ESPN+	(7)	vs. (10) Arkansas State; Second round	W 54–41	16–13	14 – Johnson	10 – Robinson	4 – Tied	Pensacola Bay Center (690); Pensacola, FL
March 8, 2024; 7:30 p.m., ESPN+	(7)	vs. (2) Troy; Quarterfinals	W 67–65	17–13	15 – Tied	9 – Rice	5 – Rice	Pensacola Bay Center (1,136); Pensacola, FL
March 10, 2024; 2:00 p.m., ESPN+	(7)	vs. (3) James Madison; Semifinals	L 54–64	17–14	13 – Rice	5 – Team	1 – Tied	Pensacola Bay Center (946); Pensacola, FL
*Non-conference game. ^{#}Rankings from AP poll. (#) Tournament seedings in parentheses. All times are in Central.

== See also ==
- 2023–24 Louisiana Ragin' Cajuns men's basketball team
