= Marshall Thundering Herd women's basketball =

Women's basketball team of Marshall University

| 2026–27 Marshall Thundering Herd women's basketball team |
- University: Marshall University
- First season: 1969–70; 57 years ago
- Head coach: Juli Fulks (3rd season)
- Location: Huntington, West Virginia
- Arena: Cam Henderson Center (capacity: 9,048)
- Conference: Sun Belt
- Nickname: Thundering Herd
- Colors: Kelly green and white
- All-time record: 800–792

NCAA Division I tournament appearances
- 1997, 2024

Conference tournament champions
- SoCon: 1997 Sun Belt: 2024

Conference regular-season champions
- SoCon: 1985, 1986, 1987, 1988, 1989 Sun Belt: 2024

Conference division champions
- MAC East: 2005

WNIT champions
- 2026

Uniforms
| Home | Away | Alternate |

The Marshall Thundering Herd women's basketball team represents Marshall University in NCAA Division I college basketball competition. They are a member of the Sun Belt Conference. The Thundering Herd are led by head coach Juli Fulks and play their home games at the on-campus Cam Henderson Center which opened in 1981. Marshall has appeared twice in the NCAA tournament, most recently in 2024.

== Postseason ==
=== NCAA tournament results ===
Marshall has been to the NCAA tournament twice. Their combined record is 0–2.

| Year | Seed | Round | Opponent | Result/Score |
|---|---|---|---|---|
| 1997 | #15 | First Round | #2 Colorado | L 49–69 |
| 2024 | #13 | First Round | #4 Virginia Tech | L 49–92 |

=== WNIT results ===
Marshall has been to the Women's National Invitation Tournament (WNIT) twice. Their combined record is 5–1. They were the WNIT Champions in 2026.

| Year | Round | Opponent | Result/Score |
|---|---|---|---|
| 2016 | First Round | Ohio | L 68–76 |
| 2026 | Second Round; Super 16; Great 8 Fab 4 Championship | UMBC; Youngstown State; Army; Arkansas State; Illinois State | W 66–53; W 72–46; W 82–65; W 69–62; W 66–41 |

=== WBI results ===
Marshall has been to the Women's Basketball Invitational (WBI) two times. Their combined record is 2–2.

| Year | Round | Opponent | Result/Score |
|---|---|---|---|
| 2015 | First Round; Quarterfinals | Northern Kentucky; Mercer | W 81–79; L 71–73 |
| 2019 | First Round; Quarterfinals | Davidson; Appalachian State | W 67–64; L 71–83 |

== Head coaches ==
| Tenure | Coach | Record | Pct. |
|---|---|---|---|
| 1969–1981 | Donna Lawson | 138–134 | .507 |
| 1981–1992 | Judy Southard | 178–130 | .578 |
| 1992–1997 | Sarah Evans-Moore | 74–67 | .525 |
| 1997–2001 | Juliene Simpson | 30–81 | .270 |
| 2001–2012 | Royce Chadwick | 161–169 | .488 |
| 2012–2017 | Matt Daniel | 71–85 | .455 |
| 2017–2023 | Tony Kemper | 79–90 | .467 |
| 2023–2024 | Kim Caldwell | 26–7 | .788 |
| 2024–present | Juli Fulks | 43–29 | .597 |

== Individual achievements ==
=== All-Americans ===
- Karen Pelphrey - W. Basketball News Service (1986 Third Team), Amer. Women Sports Fed. (1986 First Team, 1985 Second Team, 1884 Second Team)

=== Conference Players of the Year ===
| Year | Player | Conference |
|---|---|---|
| 2024 | Abby Beeman | Sun Belt |
| 1986 | Karen Pelphrey | Southern |

=== Conference Coach of the Year ===
| Year | Player | Conference |
|---|---|---|
| 2024 | Kim Caldwell | Sun Belt |
| 1991 | Judy Southard | Southern |
| 1987 | Judy Southard | Southern |
| 1986 | Judy Southard | Southern |
