= Abby Beeman =

American basketball player (born 2001)

No. 2 – Grindavík
- Position: Point guard
- League: Úrvalsdeild kvenna

Personal information
- Born: 14 August 2001 (age 25) Ridgeley, West Virginia, U.S.
- Listed height: 163 cm (5 ft 4 in)

Career information
- High school: Frankfort (Ridgeley, West Virginia, U.S.)
- College: Shepherd (2020–2022); Marshall (2022–2024)
- Playing career: 2024–present

Career history
- 2024–2025: Hamar/Þór Þorlákshöfn
- 2025–present: Grindavík

Career highlights
- 2× Úrvalsdeild assist leader (2025, 2026); Úrvalsdeild steals leader (2025); Sun Belt Conference Player of the Year (2024); All-Sun Belt Conference First Team (2024); All-PSAC East First Team (2021); PSAC Freshman of the Year (2021)

Abby Claire Beeman (born 14 August 2001) is an American basketball player. She played college basketball for Shepherd University and Marshall University.

== Professional career ==
Following her college career, she signed with Hamar/Þór Þorlákshöfn of the Icelandic Úrvalsdeild kvenna. She led the league in assists during her first season with 9.2 assists per game, along with 26.5 points and 8.5 rebounds per game.

The following season, she stayed in Iceland and signed with Grindavík. On 6 January 2026, she set the Úrvalsdeild kvenna single game assist record with 20 assists in a win against Stjarnan.
