= 2023–24 Norfolk State Spartans women's basketball team =

American college basketball season

2023–24 Norfolk State Spartans women's basketball
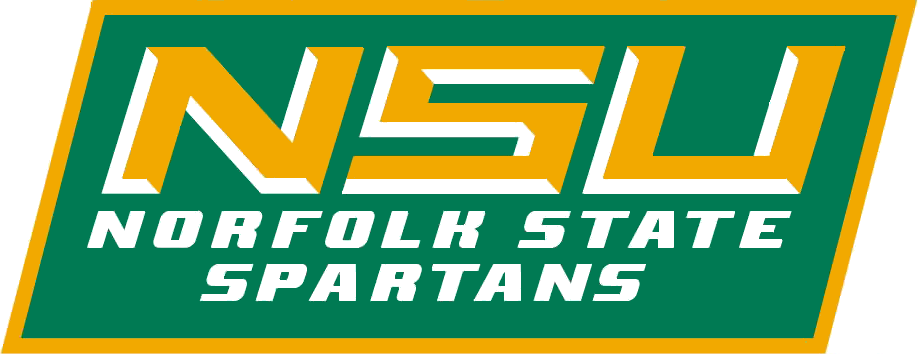

MEAC regular season and tournament champions

NCAA tournament, First Round
- Conference: Mid-Eastern Athletic Conference
- Record: 27–6 (13–1 MEAC)
- Head coach: Larry Vickers (8th season)
- Assistant coaches: Annitra Cole; Trinese Fox; Kevin Lynum
- Home arena: Joseph G. Echols Memorial Hall

2023–24 MEAC women's basketball standings
| | Conf. | | | | Overall |
| Team | W | | L | PCT | W | | L | PCT |
|---|---|---|---|---|---|---|---|---|
| Norfolk State † | 13 | – | 1 | .929 | 27 | – | 6 | .818 |
| Howard | 10 | – | 4 | .714 | 15 | – | 16 | .484 |
| North Carolina Central | 9 | – | 5 | .643 | 16 | – | 15 | .516 |
| Maryland Eastern Shore | 8 | – | 6 | .571 | 15 | – | 15 | .500 |
| Coppin State | 8 | – | 6 | .571 | 12 | – | 18 | .400 |
| Delaware State | 4 | – | 10 | .286 | 8 | – | 20 | .286 |
| Morgan State | 3 | – | 11 | .214 | 8 | – | 22 | .267 |
| South Carolina State | 1 | – | 13 | .071 | 2 | – | 28 | .067 |
† 2024 MEAC tournament winner

The 2023–24 Norfolk State Spartans women's basketball team represented Norfolk State University during the 2023–24 NCAA Division I women's basketball season. The Spartans, led by eighth-year head coach Larry Vickers, played their home games at the Joseph G. Echols Memorial Hall in Norfolk, Virginia as members of the Mid-Eastern Athletic Conference.

== Previous season ==
The Spartans finished the 2022–23 season 26–7, 11–3 in MEAC play to finish as MEAC regular season champions. In the MEAC tournament, they defeated South Carolina State, North Carolina Central, and Howard to win the MEAC tournament championship and earn the conference's automatic bid into the NCAA tournament. They received the #16 seed in the Greenville 1 Region, where they would lose to the tournament's top seed South Carolina in the first round.

== Roster ==
2023–24 Norfolk State Spartans women's basketball team
Players
Coaches

| Pos. | # | Name | Height | Year | Previous school | Hometown |
|---|---|---|---|---|---|---|
| G | 0 | Crystal White | 5 ft 10 in (1.78 m) | Jr | North Carolina A&T | Chesapeake, Virginia |
| PG | 1 | Da'Brya Clark | 5 ft 7 in (1.7 m) | Fr | Baltimore Polytechnic Institute | Baltimore, Maryland |
| G | 2 | Niya Fields | 5 ft 8 in (1.73 m) | Jr | Putnam Science Academy | Peekskill, New York |
| PG | 3 | Diamond Johnson | 5 ft 5 in (1.65 m) | Jr | NC State | Philadelphia, Pennsylvania |
| G | 4 | Anjanae Richardson | 5 ft 8 in (1.73 m) | Fr | Manor High School | Portsmouth, Virginia |
| F | 12 | Makoye Diawara | 6 ft 0 in (1.83 m) | Jr | Bayonne High School | Bayonne, New Jersey |
| F | 13 | Skye Robinson | 6 ft 2 in (1.88 m) | RS So | VCU | Ruther Glen, Virginia |
| G | 14 | Jenesis Hill | 5 ft 10 in (1.78 m) | Fr | Landstown High School | Virginia Beach, Virginia |
| F | 22 | Kierra Wheeler | 6 ft 1 in (1.85 m) | Jr | Daytona State College | Minneapolis, Minnesota |
| G | 24 | Da'naijah Williams | 5 ft 9 in (1.75 m) | Jr | St. John's | Brooklyn, New York |
| F | 30 | Paris Mullins | 6 ft 2 in (1.88 m) | GS | McNeese | McDonough, Georgia |
| G/F | 35 | Danielle Robinson | 5 ft 11 in (1.8 m) | GS | Seton Hall | Newark, New Jersey |

Head coach

- Larry Vickers (Norfolk State)

Assistant coach(es)

- Annitra Cole (North Carolina Central)
- Trinese Fox (South Carolina State)
- Kevin Lynum (American Military)

Legend

- (C) Team captain
- (S) Suspended
- (I) Ineligible
- (W) Walk-on
- Injured
- Current redshirt

Roster
Last update: February 27, 2024

== Schedule and results ==
| Date time, TV | Rank^{#} | Opponent^{#} | Result | Record | Site (attendance) city, state |
Non-conference regular season
| November 6, 2023*; 5:00 pm, FloHoops | | at William & Mary | W 66–64 | 1–0 | Kaplan Arena (3,112); Williamsburg, VA |
| November 8, 2023*; 6:00 pm, FloHoops | | at Drexel | W 51–49 | 2–0 | Daskalakis Athletic Center (628); Philadelphia, PA |
| November 12, 2023*; 2:00 pm, ESPN+ | | at Radford | W 70–46 | 3–0 | Dedmon Center (808); Radford, VA |
| November 16, 2023*; 11:00 am | | Appalachian State | W 67–53 | 4–0 | Joseph G. Echols Memorial Hall (2,157); Norfolk, VA |
| November 19, 2023*; 2:00 pm, FloHoops | | at Hampton; Battle of the Bay | W 59–45 | 5–0 | Hampton Convocation Center (1,316); Hampton, VA |
| November 24, 2023*; 1:30 pm | | vs. East Tennessee State; Miami Thanksgiving Tournament | L 35–55 | 5–1 | Watsco Center (–); Coral Gables, FL |
| November 26, 2023*; 11:00 am | | vs. Colgate; Miami Thanksgiving Tournament | W 58–51 | 6–1 | Watsco Center (–); Coral Gables, FL |
| November 29, 2023*; 8:00 pm, B1G+ | | at Minnesota | L 43–74 | 6–2 | Williams Arena (2,820); Minneapolis, MN |
| December 2, 2023*; 2:00 pm, YouTube | | at Chicago State | W 76–68 | 7–2 | Jones Convocation Center (72); Chicago, IL |
| December 10, 2023*; 2:00 pm, ACCNX | | at Wake Forest | L 46–51 | 7–3 | LJVM Coliseum (843); Winston-Salem, NC |
| December 16, 2023*; 3:00 pm, SECN+ | | at Auburn | L 39–67 | 7–4 | Neville Arena (2,396); Auburn, AL |
| December 18, 2023*; 7:00 pm, ESPN+ | | at High Point | W 85–71 ^{OT} | 8–4 | Qubein Center (755); High Point, NC |
| December 28, 2023*; 4:00 pm | | UNC Wilmington | W 96–55 | 9–4 | Joseph G. Echols Memorial Hall (831); Norfolk, VA |
| December 31, 2023*; 4:00 pm, ESPN+ | | at Longwood | W 76–59 | 10–4 | Joan Perry Brock Center (951); Farmville, VA |
MEAC regular season
| January 6, 2024; 2:00 pm | | at South Carolina State | W 94–33 | 11–4 (1–0) | SHM Memorial Center (115); Orangeburg, SC |
| January 8, 2024; 5:30 pm | | at North Carolina Central | W 81–60 | 12–4 (2–0) | McDougald–McLendon Arena (649); Durham, NC |
| January 20, 2024; 2:00 pm | | at Howard | L 60–73 | 12–5 (2–1) | Burr Gymnasium (1,233); Washington, D.C. |
| January 22, 2024*; 5:30 pm | | Mary Washington | W 99–43 | 13–5 | Joseph G. Echols Memorial Hall (522); Norfolk, VA |
| January 27, 2024; 2:00 pm | | Coppin State | W 61–53 | 14–5 (3–1) | Joseph G. Echols Memorial Hall (1,042); Norfolk, VA |
| January 29, 2024; 5:30 pm | | Morgan State | W 62–45 | 15–5 (4–1) | Joseph G. Echols Memorial Hall (1,253); Norfolk, VA |
| February 3, 2024; 2:00 pm | | Delaware State | W 79–52 | 16–5 (5–1) | Joseph G. Echols Memorial Hall (1,012); Norfolk, VA |
| February 5, 2024; 5:30 pm | | at Maryland Eastern Shore | W 80–59 | 17–5 (6–1) | Hytche Athletic Center (183); Princess Anne, MD |
| February 17, 2024; 2:00 pm | | South Carolina State | W 87–25 | 18–5 (7–1) | Joseph G. Echols Memorial Hall (2,106); Norfolk, VA |
| February 19, 2024; 5:30 pm | | North Carolina Central | W 72–44 | 19–5 (8–1) | Joseph G. Echols Memorial Hall (1,723); Norfolk, VA |
| February 24, 2024; 2:00 pm | | at Coppin State | W 64–51 | 20–5 (9–1) | Physical Education Complex (876); Baltimore, MD |
| February 26, 2024; 5:30 pm | | at Morgan State | W 79–49 | 21–5 (10–1) | Talmadge L. Hill Field House (1,537); Baltimore, MD |
| March 2, 2024; 2:00 pm, YouTube | | at Delaware State | W 65–51 | 22–5 (11–1) | Memorial Hall (750); Dover, DE |
| March 4, 2024; 5:30 pm | | Maryland Eastern Shore | W 52–40 | 23–5 (12–1) | Joseph G. Echols Memorial Hall (1,685); Norfolk, VA |
| March 7, 2024; 5:00 pm, ESPNU | | Howard | W 59–53 | 24–5 (13–1) | Joseph G. Echols Memorial Hall (1,806); Norfolk, VA |
MEAC tournament
| March 13, 2024; 12:00 pm, ESPN+ | (1) | vs. (8) South Carolina State; First round | W 75–43 | 25–5 | Norfolk Scope; Norfolk, VA |
| March 15, 2024; 12:00 pm, ESPN+ | (1) | vs. (5) Coppin State; Semifinals | W 73–44 | 26–5 | Norfolk Scope (650); Norfolk, VA |
| March 16, 2024; 4:00 pm, ESPN+ | (1) | vs. (2) Howard; Championship | W 51–46 | 27–5 | Norfolk Scope; Norfolk, VA |
NCAA tournament
| March 22, 2024*; 10:00 pm, ESPN2 | (15 P4) | at (2 P4) No. 5 Stanford; First round | L 50–79 | 27–6 | Maples Pavilion (4,537); Stanford, CA |
*Non-conference game. ^{#}Rankings from AP Poll. (#) Tournament seedings in parentheses. P4=Portland 4. All times are in Eastern.

== See also ==
- 2023–24 Norfolk State Spartans men's basketball team
