= 2023–24 Howard Bison women's basketball team =

American college basketball season

2023–24 Howard Bison women's basketball
- Conference: Mid-Eastern Athletic Conference
- Record: 15–16 (10–4 MEAC)
- Head coach: Ty Grace (9th season)
- Associate head coach: Brian Davis
- Assistant coaches: Donnie Stith; Dr. Jeanne-Marie Wilson
- Home arena: Burr Gymnasium

2023–24 MEAC women's basketball standings
	Conf.				Overall
Team	W		L	PCT	W		L	PCT
Norfolk State †	13	–	1	.929	27	–	6	.818
Howard	10	–	4	.714	15	–	16	.484
North Carolina Central	9	–	5	.643	16	–	15	.516
Maryland Eastern Shore	8	–	6	.571	15	–	15	.500
Coppin State	8	–	6	.571	12	–	18	.400
Delaware State	4	–	10	.286	8	–	20	.286
Morgan State	3	–	11	.214	8	–	22	.267
South Carolina State	1	–	13	.071	2	–	28	.067
† 2024 MEAC tournament winner

The 2023–24 Howard Bison women's basketball team represented Howard University during the 2023–24 NCAA Division I women's basketball season. The Bison, led by ninth-year head coach Ty Grace, played their home games at Burr Gymnasium in Washington, D.C. as members of the Mid-Eastern Athletic Conference (MEAC).

== Previous season ==
The Bison finished the 2022–23 season 16–14, 10–4 in MEAC play, to finish in a tie for second place. In the MEAC tournament, they defeated Delaware State in the quarterfinals and Maryland Eastern Shore in the semifinals, before falling to top-seeded Norfolk State in the championship game.

== Roster ==
2023–24 Howard Bison women's basketball team
Players
Coaches

Pos.	#	Name	Height	Year	Previous school	Hometown
G	0	Aaliyah Frazier	5 ft 7 in (1.7 m)	Fr	Plainfield High School	Plainfield, IL
G	1	Destiny Howell	6 ft 0 in (1.83 m)	Sr	St. Francis Prep	Queens, NY
G	2	Iyanna Warren (C)	5 ft 3 in (1.6 m)	Sr	Oxon Hill High School	Accokeek, MD
G	3	Nyla Cooper	5 ft 7 in (1.7 m)	Jr	Jack Britt High School	Fayetteville, NC
F	5	Marissa Steel	6 ft 2 in (1.88 m)	Jr	Laurel High School	Laurel, MD
F	11	Sa'lah Hemingway	6 ft 0 in (1.83 m)	Fr	Etiwanda High School	San Bernardino, CA
F	12	Amirah Allen	6 ft 1 in (1.85 m)	Jr	Wakefield High School	Raleigh, NC
G	13	Taleiyah Gibbs	6 ft 0 in (1.83 m)	Fr	Killeen High School	Charleston, SC
F	14	Vanessa Blake	6 ft 2 in (1.88 m)	Jr	Radford	Summerville, SC
F	22	Kaiya Creek	5 ft 10 in (1.78 m)	Sr	National Christian Academy	Seat Pleasant, MD
G	23	Tyana Walker	5 ft 9 in (1.75 m)	RS Fr	DME Academy	Leawood, KS
F	24	Te'Keyah Bland	6 ft 1 in (1.85 m)	Fr	Northwood High School	Pittsboro, NC
F	25	Nile Miller	6 ft 1 in (1.85 m)	So	Woodbury High School	Haddonfield, NJ
G	32	Janyah Bohanon	6 ft 0 in (1.83 m)	Fr	Warrensville High School	Cleveland, OH
G	33	Kaniyah Harris (C)	5 ft 10 in (1.78 m)	Sr	C.H. Flowers High School	Capitol Heights, MD
F	34	Jenesis Perrin	6 ft 5 in (1.96 m)	So	Lawrence Academy	Norwich, CT

Head coach

- Ty Grace (New Haven)

Assistant coach(es)

- Brian Davis (Tennessee Tech)
- Donnie Stith (Tulane)
- Dr. Jeanne-Marie Wilson (St. Augustine's)

Legend

- (C) Team captain
- (S) Suspended
- (I) Ineligible
- (W) Walk-on
- Injured
- Current redshirt

Roster
Last update: February 28, 2024

== Schedule and results ==
Date time, TV	Rank^{#}	Opponent^{#}	Result	Record	Site (attendance) city, state
Exhibition
October 23, 2023*; 6:00 p.m.		Virginia State	W 71–65	–	Burr Gymnasium (–); Washington, D.C.
Non-conference regular season
November 6, 2023*; 5:00 p.m., ESPN+		at George Washington	L 58–64	0–1	Charles E. Smith Center (253); Washington, D.C.
November 9, 2023*; 7:00 p.m.		Mount St. Mary's	W 58–39	1–1	Burr Gymnasium (654); Washington, D.C.
November 12, 2023*; 5:00 p.m., ESPN+		at New Hampshire	L 51–59	1–2	Lundholm Gym (194); Durham, NH
November 14, 2023*; 5:30 p.m.		Duquesne	L 51–65	1–3	Burr Gymnasium (2,431); Washington, D.C.
November 18, 2023*; 12:00 p.m., FloHoops		vs. No. 23 Ole Miss; Battle 4 Atlantis quarterfinals	L 54–67	1–4	Imperial Arena (284); Nassau, Bahamas
November 19, 2023*; 5:00 p.m., FloHoops		vs. Memphis; Battle 4 Atlantis consolation 2nd round	L 43–52	1–5	Imperial Arena (248); Nassau, Bahamas
November 20, 2023*; 7:30 p.m., FloHoops		vs. DePaul; Battle 4 Atlantis 7th-place game	L 62–85	1–6	Imperial Arena (257); Nassau, Bahamas
November 26, 2023*; 2:00 p.m.		Manhattan	L 50–53	1–7	Burr Gymnasium (245); Washington, D.C.
November 30, 2023*; 7:00 p.m., FloHoops		at Georgetown	L 43–45	1–8	McDonough Arena (451); Washington, D.C.
December 10, 2023*; 2:00 p.m., ESPN+		at Tulane	L 52–67	1–9	Devlin Fieldhouse (1,243); New Orleans, LA
December 13, 2023*; 6:00 p.m., ESPN+		at Cincinnati	L 62–87	1–10	Fifth Third Arena (573); Cincinnati, OH
December 16, 2023*; 2:00 p.m., ESPN+		at Florida Atlantic	W 46–45	2–10	Eleanor R. Baldwin Arena (389); Boca Raton, FL
December 21, 2023*; 12:00 p.m.		Hofstra	L 49–58	2–11	Burr Gymnasium (654); Washington, D.C.
December 30, 2023*; 2:00 p.m.		American	W 75–57	3–11	Burr Gymnasium (498); Washington, D.C.
MEAC regular season
January 6, 2024; 3:00 p.m.		at North Carolina Central	L 76–79 ^{OT}	3–12 (0–1)	McDougald–McLendon Arena (783); Durham, NC
January 8, 2024; 5:30 p.m.		at South Carolina State	W 70–46	4–12 (1–1)	SHM Memorial Center (212); Orangeburg, SC
January 20, 2024; 2:00 p.m.		Norfolk State	W 73–60	5–12 (2–1)	Burr Gymnasium (1,233); Washington, D.C.
January 27, 2024; 2:00 p.m.		at Morgan State	W 54–51	6–12 (3–1)	Talmadge L. Hill Field House (2,700); Baltimore, MD
January 29, 2024; 5:30 p.m., ESPN+		at Coppin State	L 58–63	6–13 (3–2)	Physical Education Complex (478); Baltimore, MD
February 3, 2024; 2:00 p.m.		Maryland Eastern Shore	W 52–47	7–13 (4–2)	Burr Gymnasium (786); Washington, D.C.
February 5, 2024; 5:30 p.m.		at Delaware State	W 69–57	8–13 (5–2)	Memorial Hall (550); Dover, DE
February 17, 2024; 1:00 p.m.		North Carolina Central	L 64–70 ^{OT}	8–14 (5–3)	Burr Gymnasium (567); Washington, D.C.
February 19, 2024; 5:30 p.m., ESPN+		South Carolina State	W 69–51	9–14 (6–3)	Burr Gymnasium (500); Washington, D.C.
February 24, 2024; 2:00 p.m., ESPN+		Morgan State	W 70–47	10–14 (7–3)	Burr Gymnasium (850); Washington, D.C.
February 26, 2024; 5:30 p.m., ESPN+		Coppin State	W 76–73	11–14 (8–3)	Burr Gymnasium (500); Washington, D.C.
March 2, 2024; 2:00 p.m.		at Maryland Eastern Shore	W 64–48	12–14 (9–3)	Hytche Athletic Center (183); Princess Anne, MD
March 4, 2024; 5:30 p.m., ESPN+		Delaware State	W 61–43	13–14 (10–3)	Burr Gymnasium (250); Washington, D.C.
March 7, 2024; 5:00 p.m., ESPNU		at Norfolk State	L 53–59	13–15 (10–4)	Joseph G. Echols Memorial Hall (1,806); Norfolk, VA
MEAC tournament
March 13, 2024; 2:00 p.m., ESPN+		vs. Morgan State; Quarterfinals	W 49–44	14–15	Norfolk Scope; Norfolk, VA
March 15, 2024; 2:00 p.m., ESPN+		North Carolina Central; Semifinals	W 69–56	15–15	Norfolk Scope (612); Norfolk, VA
March 16, 2024; 4:00 p.m., ESPN+/ESPNU		at Norfolk State; Championship	L 46–51	15–16	Norfolk Scope; Norfolk, VA
*Non-conference game. ^{#}Rankings from AP poll. (#) Tournament seedings in parentheses. All times are in Eastern.
