= 2023–24 Maryland Eastern Shore Hawks women's basketball team =

American college basketball season

2023–24 Maryland Eastern Shore Hawks women's basketball
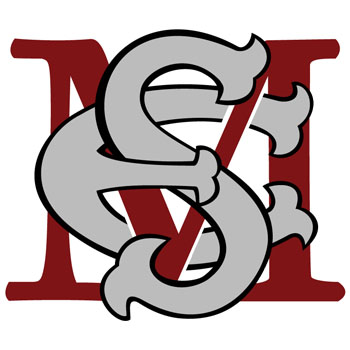
- Conference: Mid-Eastern Athletic Conference
- Record: 14–14 (7–6 MEAC)
- Head coach: Fred Batchelor (18th season)
- Assistant coaches: Casey Monroe-Gaskins; Amber Elliott
- Home arena: Hytche Athletic Center

2023–24 MEAC women's basketball standings
	Conf.				Overall
Team	W		L	PCT	W		L	PCT
Norfolk State †	13	–	1	.929	27	–	6	.818
Howard	10	–	4	.714	15	–	16	.484
North Carolina Central	9	–	5	.643	16	–	15	.516
Maryland Eastern Shore	8	–	6	.571	15	–	15	.500
Coppin State	8	–	6	.571	12	–	18	.400
Delaware State	4	–	10	.286	8	–	20	.286
Morgan State	3	–	11	.214	8	–	22	.267
South Carolina State	1	–	13	.071	2	–	28	.067
† 2024 MEAC tournament winner

The 2023–24 Maryland Eastern Shore Hawks women's basketball team represented the University of Maryland Eastern Shore during the 2023–24 NCAA Division I women's basketball season. The Hawks, led by 18th-year head coach Fred Batchelor, played their home games at the Hytche Athletic Center in Princess Anne, Maryland as members of the Mid-Eastern Athletic Conference (MEAC).

== Previous season ==
The Hawks finished the 2022–23 season 10–20, 5–9 in MEAC play, to finish in a three-way tie for fifth place. In the MEAC tournament, they upset Morgan State in the quarterfinals, before falling to Howard in the semifinals.

== Roster ==
2023–24 Maryland Eastern Shore Hawks women's basketball team
Players
Coaches

Pos.	#	Name	Height	Year	Previous school	Hometown
G	0	Chaniqwa Gilliam	5 ft 8 in (1.73 m)	GS	William & Mary	Norfolk, VA
G	1	Caché Wilson	5 ft 7 in (1.7 m)	Sr	Baltimore Poly Institute	Baltimore, MD
F/C	2	Mahogany Lester	6 ft 0 in (1.83 m)	GS	Princess Anne HS	Virginia Beach, VA
F	3	Amira Ofunniyin	6 ft 0 in (1.83 m)	Fr	Panther Creek HS	Cary, NC
PG	4	Jála Bannerman	5 ft 6 in (1.68 m)	So	Saint Frances Academy	Baltimore, MD
PG	5	Mya Thomas	5 ft 5 in (1.65 m)	GS	Deep Creek HS	Chesapeake, VA
G	10	Aysia Hinton	5 ft 7 in (1.7 m)	Fr	Winston Salem Christian	Durham, NC
G	11	Zamara Haynes	5 ft 7 in (1.7 m)	Sr	Imhotep Institute Charter HS	Philadelphia, PA
F/C	21	Ariana Seawell	6 ft 2 in (1.88 m)	Jr	Harry S. Truman HS	The Bronx, NY
G	22	Amiaya Morgan	5 ft 9 in (1.75 m)	Jr	Delaware State	Sicklerville, NJ
F/C	24	Lesley Thomas	6 ft 0 in (1.83 m)	Jr	Winston Salem Christian	Browns Summit, NC
G	25	Ashanti Lynch	5 ft 9 in (1.75 m)	So	North Lenoir HS	Hookerton, NC
F	33	Lainey Allen	6 ft 2 in (1.88 m)	So	Plymouth-Whitemarsh HS	Plymouth Meeting, PA

Head coach

- Fred Batchelor (Valley Forge)

Assistant coach(es)

- Casey Monroe-Gaskins (Maryland Eastern Shore)
- Amber Elliott (Maryland Eastern Shore)

Legend

- (C) Team captain
- (S) Suspended
- (I) Ineligible
- (W) Walk-on
- Injured
- Current redshirt

Roster
Last update: February 28, 2024

== Schedule and results ==
Date time, TV	Rank^{#}	Opponent^{#}	Result	Record	Site (attendance) city, state
Non-conference regular season
November 6, 2023*; 7:00 p.m., FloHoops		at Georgetown	L 50–61	0–1	McDonough Arena (1,503); Washington, D.C.
November 8, 2023*; 7:00 p.m., ACCNX		at Virginia	L 52–76	0–2	John Paul Jones Arena (3,797); Charlottesville, VA
November 11, 2023*; 6:30 p.m.		Washington Adventist	W 91–71	1–2	Hytche Athletic Center (186); Princess Anne, MD
November 15, 2023*; 5:30 p.m.		Stony Brook	L 63–76	1–3	Hytche Athletic Center (186); Princess Anne, MD
November 18, 2023*; 2:00 p.m.		George Washington	W 62–59	2–3	Hytche Athletic Center (183); Princess Anne, MD
November 21, 2023*; 7:00 p.m., FloHoops		at Towson	Suspended at halftime due to a roof issue		SECU Arena; Towson, MD
November 26, 2023*; 2:00 p.m.		UMBC	W 70–54	3–3	Hytche Athletic Center (190); Princess Anne, MD
November 29, 2023*; 6:00 p.m.		Mount St. Mary's	W 69–52	4–3	Hytche Athletic Center (183); Princess Anne, MD
December 2, 2023*; 1:00 p.m., FloHoops		at Seton Hall	L 54–78	4–4	Walsh Gymnasium (777); South Orange, NJ
December 4, 2023*; 6:30 p.m., ESPN+		at East Carolina	L 57–72	4–5	Williams Arena (1,053); Greenville, NC
December 9, 2023*; 2:00 p.m.		Fairleigh Dickinson	W 54–47	5–5	Hytche Athletic Center (183); Princess Anne, MD
December 16, 2023*; 4:00 p.m., NEC Front Row		at Wagner	W 72–50	6–5	Spiro Sports Center (264); Staten Island, NY
December 20, 2023*; 6:00 p.m., ESPN+		at VCU	L 36–59	6–6	Siegel Center (421); Richmond, VA
December 30, 2023*; 12:00 p.m., ESPN+		at Buffalo	L 61–70	6–7	Alumni Arena (1,435); Amherst, NY
January 3, 2024*; 6:00 p.m.		Lancaster Bible	W 99–37	7–7	Hytche Athletic Center (183); Princess Anne, MD
MEAC regular season
January 6, 2024; 2:00 p.m.		Morgan State	L 45–48	7–8 (0–1)	Hytche Athletic Center (183); Princess Anne, MD
January 8, 2024; 5:30 p.m., ESPN+		at Coppin State	L 69–75	7–9 (0–2)	Physical Education Complex (389); Baltimore, MD
January 20, 2024; 2:00 p.m.		at Delaware State	W 76–45	8–9 (1–2)	Memorial Hall (500); Dover, DE
January 24, 2024*; 6:00 p.m.		at Towson; Resumption of game from November 21	L 55–60	8–10	SECU Arena (–); Towson, MD
January 27, 2024; 3:15 p.m.		North Carolina Central	W 78–61	9–10 (2–2)	Hytche Athletic Center (183); Princess Anne, MD
January 29, 2024; 5:30 p.m.		South Carolina State	W 63–45	10–10 (3–2)	Hytche Athletic Center (183); Princess Anne, MD
February 3, 2024; 2:00 p.m.		at Howard	L 47–52	10–11 (3–3)	Burr Gymnasium (786); Washington, D.C.
February 5, 2024; 5:30 p.m.		Norfolk State	L 59–80	10–12 (3–4)	Hytche Athletic Center (183); Princess Anne, MD
February 19, 2024; 5:30 p.m.		Coppin State	W 73–51	11–12 (4–4)	Hytche Athletic Center (183); Princess Anne, MD
February 21, 2024; 5:30 p.m.		at Morgan State; Rescheduled from February 17	W 58–46	12–12 (5–4)	Talmadge L. Hill Field House (257); Baltimore, MD
February 24, 2024; 2:00 p.m.		at North Carolina Central	W 71–64	13–12 (6–4)	McDougald–McLendon Arena (1,212); Durham, NC
February 26, 2024; 5:30 p.m.		at South Carolina State	W 67–51	14–12 (7–4)	SHM Memorial Center (650); Orangeburg, SC
March 2, 2024; 2:00 p.m.		Howard	L 48–64	14–13 (7–5)	Hytche Athletic Center (183); Princess Anne, MD
March 4, 2024; 5:30 p.m.		at Norfolk State	L 40–52	14–14 (7–6)	Joseph G. Echols Memorial Hall (1,685); Norfolk, VA
March 7, 2024; 5:30 p.m.		Delaware State	W 73–63	15–14 (8–6)	Hytche Athletic Center (183); Princess Anne, MD
MEAC tournament
March 14, 2024; 12:00 p.m., ESPN+	(4)	vs. (5) Coppin State; Quarterfinals	L 55–61	15–15	Norfolk Scope (715); Norfolk, VA
*Non-conference game. ^{#}Rankings from AP poll. (#) Tournament seedings in parentheses. All times are in Eastern.
