= 2023–24 Morgan State Lady Bears basketball team =

American college basketball season

2023–24 Morgan State Lady Bears basketball
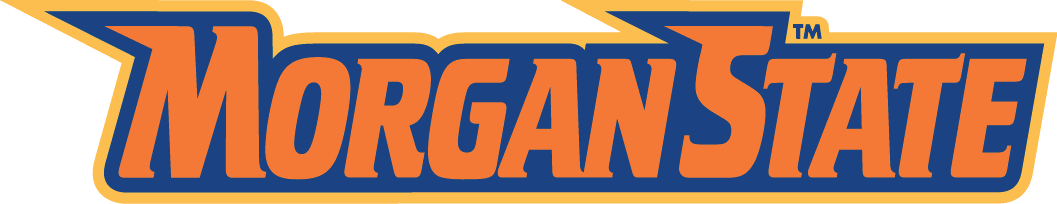
- Conference: Mid-Eastern Athletic Conference
- Record: 8–20 (3–10 MEAC)
- Head coach: Ed Davis Jr. (8th season)
- Associate head coach: Donchez Graham
- Assistant coaches: Tykyrah Williams; Janelle Silver-Martin
- Home arena: Talmadge L. Hill Field House

2023–24 MEAC women's basketball standings
	Conf.				Overall
Team	W		L	PCT	W		L	PCT
Norfolk State †	13	–	1	.929	27	–	6	.818
Howard	10	–	4	.714	15	–	16	.484
North Carolina Central	9	–	5	.643	16	–	15	.516
Maryland Eastern Shore	8	–	6	.571	15	–	15	.500
Coppin State	8	–	6	.571	12	–	18	.400
Delaware State	4	–	10	.286	8	–	20	.286
Morgan State	3	–	11	.214	8	–	22	.267
South Carolina State	1	–	13	.071	2	–	28	.067
† 2024 MEAC tournament winner

The 2023–24 Morgan State Lady Bears basketball team represented Morgan State University during the 2023–24 NCAA Division I women's basketball season. The Lady Bears, led by eighth-year head coach Ed Davis Jr., played their home games at Talmadge L. Hill Field House in Baltimore, Maryland as members of the Mid-Eastern Athletic Conference (MEAC).

The Lady Bears finished the season 8–20, 3–10 in MEAC play, to finish in seventh place. They were defeated by Howard in the quarterfinals of the MEAC tournament.

== Previous season ==
The Lady Bears finished the 2022–23 season 17–12, 10–4 in MEAC play, to finish in a tie for second place. In the MEAC tournament, they were upset by Maryland Eastern Shore in the quarterfinals. They received an automatic bid into the WNIT, where they lost to Wake Forest in the first round.

== Roster ==
2023–24 Morgan State Lady Bears women's basketball team
Players
Coaches

Pos.	#	Name	Height	Year	Previous school	Hometown
G	0	Tamaria Rumph	5 ft 2 in (1.57 m)	Fr	McClatchy High School	Sacramento, CA
G	1	Dakota Alston	5 ft 7 in (1.7 m)	Fr	Detroit Edison Public School Academy	Detroit, MI
G	2	Gabrielle Johnson	5 ft 8 in (1.73 m)	So	Western High School	Baltimore, MD
G	3	Brooklyn Jones	5 ft 7 in (1.7 m)	Sr	Niagara	Pittsburgh, PA
F	4	Joelle Johnson	5 ft 11 in (1.8 m)	GS	Northwestern State	Louisville, KY
G	5	Sedayjha Payne	5 ft 8 in (1.73 m)	Sr	Tallahassee Community College	Apopka, FL
G	10	Emily Jones	5 ft 9 in (1.75 m)	Jr	Sacred Heart Cathedral Preparatory	San Francisco, CA
G	12	Nakilah Johnson	5 ft 11 in (1.8 m)	Jr	Weber State	Oakland, CA
F	14	Laila Fair	6 ft 2 in (1.88 m)	Jr	UMass	Middlesex, NJ
F	15	Kaia Ponder	6 ft 0 in (1.83 m)	So	Richardson High School	Tulsa, OK
C	22	Jael Butler	6 ft 2 in (1.88 m)	So	Valley Christian High School	Gilroy, CA
G	23	Amari Smith	5 ft 10 in (1.78 m)	Fr	Menchville High School	Newport News, VA
F	24	Anjanae Mueck	6 ft 0 in (1.83 m)	Sr	Mississippi Valley State	Phoenix, AZ

Head coach

- Ed Davis Jr. (West Virginia State)

Assistant coach(es)

- Donchez Graham (Morgan State)
- Tykyrah Williams (Morgan State)
- Janelle Silver-Martin (Morgan State)

Legend

- (C) Team captain
- (S) Suspended
- (I) Ineligible
- (W) Walk-on
- Injured
- Current redshirt

Roster
Last update: March 2, 2024

== Schedule and results ==
Date time, TV	Rank^{#}	Opponent^{#}	Result	Record	Site (attendance) city, state
Non-conference regular season
November 6, 2023*; 5:30 p.m.		Washington Adventist	W 59–57	1–0	Talmadge L. Hill Field House (876); Baltimore, MD
November 12, 2023*; 2:00 p.m.		Sacred Heart	L 55–63	1–1	Talmadge L. Hill Field House (590); Baltimore, MD
November 16, 2023*; 11:00 a.m.		Notre Dame (MD)	W 75–32	2–1	Talmadge L. Hill Field House (785); Baltimore, MD
November 18, 2023*; 2:00 p.m.		Davidson	L 48–62	2–2	Talmadge L. Hill Field House (89); Baltimore, MD
November 23, 2023*; 4:30 p.m.		vs. Campbell; Puerto Rico Clasico	L 46–60	2–3	Coliseo Rubén Rodríguez (100); Bayamón, Puerto Rico
November 24, 2023*; 4:00 p.m.		vs. UNC Asheville; Puerto Rico Clasico	W 53–51	3–3	Coliseo Rubén Rodríguez (100); Bayamón, Puerto Rico
November 29, 2023*; 7:00 p.m., FloHoops		at Towson; Charm City Hoops Classic	L 69–80	3–4	SECU Arena (614); Towson, MD
December 2, 2023*; 2:00 p.m., NEC Front Row		at Saint Francis	L 59–69	3–5	DeGol Arena (269); Loretto, PA
December 6, 2023*; 7:00 p.m., SECN+		at No. 1 South Carolina	L 38–104	3–6	Colonial Life Arena (16,181); Columbia, SC
December 9, 2023*; 2:00 p.m.		UMBC; Charm City Hoops Classic	W 65–42	4–6	Talmadge L. Hill Field House (298); Baltimore, MD
December 17, 2023*; 2:00 p.m., ESPN+		at Stetson	L 48–56	4–7	Edmunds Center (228); DeLand, FL
December 19, 2023*; 2:00 p.m., ESPN+		at UCF	L 41–67	4–8	Addition Financial Arena (787); Orlando, FL
December 28, 2023*; 5:00 p.m.		at Oregon State	L 51–80	4–9	Gill Coliseum (3,561); Corvallis, OR
December 31, 2023*; 9:00 p.m.		at No. 9 Stanford	L 38–98	4–10	Maples Pavilion (2,751); Stanford, CA
January 3, 2024*; 5:30 p.m.		Central Connecticut	W 68–65	5–10	Talmadge L. Hill Field House (137); Baltimore, MD
MEAC regular season
January 6, 2024; 2:00 p.m.		at Maryland Eastern Shore	W 48–45	6–10 (1–0)	Hytche Athletic Center (183); Princess Anne, MD
January 8, 2024; 5:30 p.m.		Delaware State	L 71–73 ^{OT}	6–11 (1–1)	Talmadge L. Hill Field House (323); Baltimore, MD
January 20, 2024; 2:00 p.m., ESPN+		at Coppin State	L 47–67	6–12 (1–2)	Physical Education Complex (423); Baltimore, MD
January 27, 2024; 2:00 p.m.		Howard	L 51–54	6–13 (1–3)	Talmadge L. Hill Field House (2,700); Baltimore, MD
January 29, 2024; 5:30 p.m.		at Norfolk State	L 45–62	6–14 (1–4)	Joseph G. Echols Memorial Hall (1,253); Norfolk, VA
February 3, 2024; 2:00 p.m.		at South Carolina State	W 65–59	7–14 (2–4)	SHM Memorial Center (450); Orangeburg, SC
February 5, 2024; 5:30 p.m.		at North Carolina Central	L 65–66	7–15 (2–5)	McDougald–McLendon Arena (942); Durham, NC
February 19, 2024; 5:30 p.m.		at Delaware State	Postponed		Memorial Hall; Dover, DE
February 21, 2024; 5:30 p.m.		Maryland Eastern Shore; Rescheduled from February 17	L 46–58	7–16 (2–6)	Talmadge L. Hill Field House (257); Baltimore, MD
February 24, 2024; 2:00 p.m., ESPN+		at Howard	L 47–70	7–17 (2–7)	Burr Gymnasium (850); Washington, D.C.
February 26, 2024; 5:30 p.m.		Norfolk State	L 49–79	7–18 (2–8)	Talmadge L. Hill Field House (1,537); Baltimore, MD
February 29, 2024; 5:30 p.m.		at Delaware State; Rescheduled from February 19	L 53–57	7–19 (2–9)	Memorial Hall (250); Dover, DE
March 2, 2024; 2:00 p.m.		South Carolina State	W 61–29	8–19 (3–19)	Talmadge L. Hill Field House (1,157); Baltimore, MD
March 4, 2024; 5:30 p.m.		North Carolina Central	L 58–63	8–20 (3–10)	Talmadge L. Hill Field House (1,987); Baltimore, MD
March 7, 2024; 5:30 p.m.		Coppin State	L 45–65	8–21 (3–11)	Talmadge L. Hill Field House (1,073); Baltimore, MD
MEAC tournament
March 13, 2024; 2:00 p.m., ESPN+	(7)	vs. (2) Howard; Quarterfinals	L 44–49	8–22	Norfolk Scope; Norfolk, VA
*Non-conference game. ^{#}Rankings from AP poll. (#) Tournament seedings in parentheses. All times are in Eastern.
