= 2023–24 South Carolina State Lady Bulldogs basketball team =

American college basketball season

2023–24 South Carolina State Lady Bulldogs basketball
- Conference: Mid-Eastern Athletic Conference
- Record: 2–26 (1–12 MEAC)
- Head coach: Tim Eatman (2nd season)
- Assistant coaches: Regina Garrett; Ervin Monier; Jaquanna Murray; Jordan Wallace
- Home arena: SHM Memorial Center

2023–24 MEAC women's basketball standings
	Conf.				Overall
Team	W		L	PCT	W		L	PCT
Norfolk State †	13	–	1	.929	27	–	6	.818
Howard	10	–	4	.714	15	–	16	.484
North Carolina Central	9	–	5	.643	16	–	15	.516
Maryland Eastern Shore	8	–	6	.571	15	–	15	.500
Coppin State	8	–	6	.571	12	–	18	.400
Delaware State	4	–	10	.286	8	–	20	.286
Morgan State	3	–	11	.214	8	–	22	.267
South Carolina State	1	–	13	.071	2	–	28	.067
† 2024 MEAC tournament winner

The 2023–24 South Carolina State Lady Bulldogs basketball team represented South Carolina State University during the 2023–24 NCAA Division I women's basketball season. The Lady Bulldogs, led by second-year head coach Tim Eatman, played their home games at SHM Memorial Center in Orangeburg, South Carolina as members of the Mid-Eastern Athletic Conference (MEAC). They finished the season 2–28, 1–13 in MEAC play, to finish in eighth (last) place.

== Previous season ==
The Lady Bulldogs finished the 2022–23 season 3–27, 2–12 in MEAC play, to finish in eighth (last) place. In the MEAC tournament, they were defeated by top-seeded and eventual tournament champions Norfolk State in the quarterfinals.

== Roster ==
2023–24 South Carolina State Bulldogs women's basketball team
Players
Coaches

Pos.	#	Name	Height	Year	Previous school	Hometown
G	0	Janiah Hinton	5 ft 8 in (1.73 m)	RS So	Saltillo HS	Tupelo, MS
PG	1	Mekayla Lumpkin	5 ft 4 in (1.63 m)	Jr	Ramsay HS	Birmingham, AL
G	3	Monajah Ford	5 ft 8 in (1.73 m)	Fr	Discovery HS	Winter Haven, FL
SF	4	Taniya McGowan	5 ft 10 in (1.78 m)	Fr	Archer HS	Loganville, GA
G	10	Somer Wilson	5 ft 10 in (1.78 m)	Sr	Legion Collegiate Academy	Charlotte, NC
G/F	12	Jayah Hicks	5 ft 11 in (1.8 m)	Sr	Wayne Memorial HS	Wayne, MI
G/F	13	Rakyha Reid	5 ft 9 in (1.75 m)	Jr	Oakland Technical HS	Oakland, CA
G	15	Jordan Releford	5 ft 5 in (1.65 m)	GS	UNC Greensboro	Decatur, GA
PF	21	Jhaven Meade	6 ft 4 in (1.93 m)	Fr	Franklin County HS	Frankfort, KY
G	22	Morgan Beacham	5 ft 8 in (1.73 m)	GS	Bethune–Cookman	Orlando, FL
C	24	Heaven Harper	6 ft 3 in (1.91 m)	Fr	Monsignor Scanlan HS	The Bronx, NY
F	25	Carmen Zafra-Bermùdez	6 ft 2 in (1.88 m)	Fr	Santa Victoria HS	Córdoba, Spain
G	30	Jada Morgan	5 ft 8 in (1.73 m)	Fr	Warner Robins HS	Macon, GA
SF	32	Cassandra Colòn	5 ft 10 in (1.78 m)	Sr	Georgetown College	Philadelphia, PA

Head coach

- Tim Eatman (Talladega)

Assistant coach(es)

- Regina Garrett (South Carolina State)
- Ervin Monier (St. Mary's (TX))
- Jaquanna Murray (South Carolina State)
- Jordan Wallace (Rutgers)

Legend

- (C) Team captain
- (S) Suspended
- (I) Ineligible
- (W) Walk-on
- Injured
- Current redshirt

Roster
Last update: March 2, 2024

== Schedule and results ==
Date time, TV	Rank^{#}	Opponent^{#}	Result	Record	Site (attendance) city, state
Non-conference regular season
November 9, 2023*; 9:00 p.m.		at No. 5 Utah; Preseason WNIT	L 48–108	0–1	Jon M. Huntsman Center (3,935); Salt Lake City, UT
November 11, 2023*; 12:00 p.m., ESPN+		at UNC Greensboro	L 30–61	0–2	Fleming Gymnasium (359); Greensboro, NC
November 15, 2023*; 6:30 p.m.		Coastal Carolina	L 61–73	0–3	SHM Memorial Center (312); Orangeburg, SC
November 18, 2023*; 2:00 p.m.		Winthrop	L 45–54	0–4	SHM Memorial Center (150); Orangeburg, SC
November 20, 2023*; 7:00 p.m., ESPN+		at USC Upstate	L 53–58	0–5	G. B. Hodge Center (235); Spartanburg, SC
November 24, 2023*; 7:00 p.m., SLN		at South Dakota State	L 42–72	0–6	Frost Arena (2,139); Brookings, SD
November 25, 2023*; 2:00 p.m., SLN		vs. South Dakota	L 52–72	0–7	Sanford Pentagon (1,808); Sioux Falls, SD
November 29, 2023*; 6:30 p.m.		Queens	W 76–58	1–7	SHM Memorial Center (135); Orangeburg, SC
December 2, 2023*; 2:00 p.m., ESPN+		at Charleston Southern	L 58–68	1–8	Buccaneer Field House (329); North Charleston, SC
December 10, 2023*; 3:00 p.m.		at Alabama A&M	L 44–62	1–9	Alabama A&M Events Center (831); Huntsville, AL
December 12, 2023*; 1:00 p.m., ESPN+		at UAB	L 54–69	1–10	Bartow Arena (289); Birmingham, AL
December 15, 2023*; 6:30 p.m., ESPN+		at Presbyterian	L 52–63	1–11	Templeton Physical Education Center (90); Clinton, SC
December 19, 2023*; 7:00 p.m., FloHoops		at College of Charleston	L 64–84	1–12	TD Arena (315); Charleston, SC
December 21, 2023*; 7:00 p.m., ESPN+		at Furman	L 43–67	1–13	Timmons Arena (502); Greenville, SC
December 29, 2023*; 7:30 p.m., ESPN+		at Jacksonville State	L 41–55	1–14	Pete Mathews Coliseum (1,012); Jacksonville, AL
MEAC regular season
January 6, 2024; 2:00 p.m.		Norfolk State	L 33–94	1–15 (0–1)	SHM Memorial Center (115); Orangeburg, SC
January 8, 2024; 5:30 p.m.		Howard	L 46–70	1–16 (0–2)	SHM Memorial Center (212); Orangeburg, SC
January 20, 2024; 2:00 p.m.		North Carolina Central	L 61–75	1–17 (0–3)	SHM Memorial Center (650); Orangeburg, SC
January 27, 2024; 3:15 p.m.		at Delaware State	L 49–61	1–18 (0–4)	Memorial Hall (650); Dover, DE
January 29, 2024; 5:30 p.m.		at Maryland Eastern Shore	L 45–63	1–19 (0–5)	Hytche Athletic Center (183); Princess Anne, MD
February 3, 2024; 2:00 p.m.		Morgan State	L 59–65	1–20 (0–6)	SHM Memorial Center (450); Orangeburg, SC
February 5, 2024; 5:30 p.m.		Coppin State	L 39–63	1–21 (0–7)	SHM Memorial Center (220); Orangeburg, SC
February 17, 2024; 2:00 p.m.		at Norfolk State	L 25–87	1–22 (0–8)	Joseph G. Echols Memorial Hall (2,106); Norfolk, VA
February 19, 2024; 5:30 p.m., ESPN+		at Howard	L 51–69	1–23 (0–9)	Burr Gymnasium (500); Washington, D.C.
February 24, 2024; 2:00 p.m.		Delaware State	W 69–61	2–23 (1–9)	SHM Memorial Center (575); Orangeburg, SC
February 26, 2024; 5:30 p.m.		Maryland Eastern Shore	L 51–67	2–24 (1–10)	SHM Memorial Center (650); Orangeburg, SC
March 2, 2024; 2:00 p.m.		at Morgan State	L 29–61	2–25 (1–11)	Talmadge L. Hill Field House (1,157); Baltimore, MD
March 4, 2024; 5:30 p.m., ESPN+		at Coppin State	L 43–61	2–26 (1–12)	Physical Education Complex (250); Baltimore, MD
March 7, 2024; 5:30 p.m.		at North Carolina Central	L 54–73	2–27 (1–13)	McDougald–McLendon Arena (627); Durham, NC
MEAC tournament
March 13, 2024; 12:00 p.m., ESPN+	(8)	vs. (1) Norfolk State; First round	L 43–75	2–28	Norfolk Scope; Norfolk, VA
*Non-conference game. ^{#}Rankings from AP poll. (#) Tournament seedings in parentheses. All times are in Eastern.
