= 2023–24 North Carolina Central Eagles women's basketball team =

American college basketball season

2023–24 North Carolina Central Eagles women's basketball
- Conference: Mid-Eastern Athletic Conference
- Record: 16–15 (9–5 MEAC)
- Head coach: Terrence Baxter (interim)
- Assistant coaches: Dorthell Little; N'Dea Bryant; Ashlyn Lockard
- Home arena: McDougald–McLendon Arena

2023–24 MEAC women's basketball standings
| | Conf. | | | | Overall |
| Team | W | | L | PCT | W | | L | PCT |
|---|---|---|---|---|---|---|---|---|
| Norfolk State † | 13 | – | 1 | .929 | 27 | – | 6 | .818 |
| Howard | 10 | – | 4 | .714 | 15 | – | 16 | .484 |
| North Carolina Central | 9 | – | 5 | .643 | 16 | – | 15 | .516 |
| Maryland Eastern Shore | 8 | – | 6 | .571 | 15 | – | 15 | .500 |
| Coppin State | 8 | – | 6 | .571 | 12 | – | 18 | .400 |
| Delaware State | 4 | – | 10 | .286 | 8 | – | 20 | .286 |
| Morgan State | 3 | – | 11 | .214 | 8 | – | 22 | .267 |
| South Carolina State | 1 | – | 13 | .071 | 2 | – | 28 | .067 |
† 2024 MEAC tournament winner

The 2023–24 North Carolina Central Eagles women's basketball team represented North Carolina Central University during the 2023–24 NCAA Division I women's basketball season. The Eagles, led by interim head coach Terrence Baxter, played their home games at McDougald–McLendon Arena in Durham, North Carolina as members of the Mid-Eastern Athletic Conference (MEAC).

== Previous season ==
The Eagles finished the 2022–23 season 15–16, 8–6 in MEAC play, to finish in fourth place. In the MEAC tournament, they defeated Coppin State in the quarterfinals, before falling to top-seeded and eventual tournament champions Norfolk State in the semifinals.

On September 13, 2023, the school announced that they released head coach Trisha Stafford-Odom from her contract, after six years with the team, with assistant coach Terrence Baxter being named the interim head coach for the 2023–24 season.

== Roster ==
2023–24 North Carolina Central Eagles women's basketball team
Players
Coaches

| Pos. | # | Name | Height | Year | Previous school | Hometown |
|---|---|---|---|---|---|---|
| G | 0 | Kimeira Burks | 5 ft 8 in (1.73 m) | RS Sr | Daytona State College | Chicago, IL |
| F/C | 1 | Jada Creech | 5 ft 10 in (1.78 m) | Fr | Winston Salem Christian School | Charlotte, NC |
| G/F | 2 | Taylor Williams | 5 ft 10 in (1.78 m) | RS Sr | College of Charleston | Daytona Beach, FL |
| F | 3 | Morgan Callahan | 6 ft 1 in (1.85 m) | RS Jr | Zion-Benton Township High School | Beach Park, IL |
| G | 4 | Tierney Coleman | 5 ft 9 in (1.75 m) | RS Jr | Sam Houston | Missouri City, TX |
| G | 5 | Kyla Bryant | 5 ft 7 in (1.7 m) | Fr | Salisbury High School | Salisbury, NC |
| G | 11 | Tippy Robertson | 5 ft 4 in (1.63 m) | RS Sr | Stetson | Chicago, IL |
| G/F | 12 | Jada Tiggett | 6 ft 2 in (1.88 m) | Fr | Rancho Christian School | Winchester, CA |
| G | 13 | Ray'ven Robinson | 5 ft 8 in (1.73 m) | So | Lake Region State College | Minneapolis, MN |
| F | 15 | Sydney Avoletta | 6 ft 4 in (1.93 m) | RS Jr | Iona | Sterling, VA |
| G | 23 | Janiah Jones | 5 ft 6 in (1.68 m) | Jr | Richard Bland College | Woodbridge, VA |
| F | 24 | Aniya Finger | 6 ft 1 in (1.85 m) | RS Jr | Hopewell High School | Charlotte, NC |
| G | 32 | Kimia Carter | 5 ft 10 in (1.78 m) | RS Sr | Florida Atlantic | Chattanooga, TN |
| C | 33 | Nijah Cunningham | 6 ft 4 in (1.93 m) | RS Jr | Catawba Valley Community College | Charlotte, NC |

Head coach

- Terrence Baxter (interim) (Pfeiffer)

Assistant coach(es)

- Dorthell Little (Catawba Valley)
- N'Dea Bryant (North Carolina)
- Ashlyn Lockard (North Carolina Central)

Legend

- (C) Team captain
- (S) Suspended
- (I) Ineligible
- (W) Walk-on
- Injured
- Current redshirt

Roster
Last update: February 29, 2024

== Schedule and results ==
| Date time, TV | Rank^{#} | Opponent^{#} | Result | Record | Site (attendance) city, state |
Non-conference regular season
| November 9, 2023*; 8:00 p.m. | | at Washington | L 39–113 | 0–1 | Alaska Airlines Arena (1,481); Seattle, WA |
| November 14, 2023*; 7:00 p.m., ESPN+ | | at Wofford | L 52–82 | 0–2 | Jerry Richardson Indoor Stadium (512); Spartanburg, SC |
| November 17, 2023*; 5:30 p.m. | | Mid-Atlantic Christian | W 132–22 | 1–2 | McDougald–McLendon Arena (475); Durham, NC |
| November 19, 2023*; 2:00 p.m. | | Johnson & Wales (NC) | W 83–50 | 2–2 | McDougald–McLendon Arena (379); Durham, NC |
| November 22, 2023*; 1:00 p.m., NCCUSN | | Western Carolina | W 69–58 | 3–2 | McDougald–McLendon Arena (268); Durham, NC |
| November 26, 2023*; 2:00 p.m., ACCNX | | at Duke | L 45–93 | 3–3 | Cameron Indoor Stadium (1,211); Durham, NC |
| November 29, 2023*; 11:00 a.m., ESPN+ | | at Presbyterian | L 58–76 | 3–4 | Templeton Physical Education Center (507); Clinton, SC |
| December 5, 2023*; 7:00 p.m., FloHoops | | at Campbell | L 61–74 | 3–5 | Gore Arena (909); Buies Creek, NC |
| December 11, 2023*; 6:30 p.m., ESPN+ | | at Jacksonville | L 67–70 | 3–6 | Swisher Gymnasium (72); Jacksonville, FL |
| December 14, 2023*; 7:00 p.m., ESPN+ | | at UNC Greensboro | L 55–66 | 3–7 | Fleming Gymnasium (252); Greensboro, NC |
| December 18, 2023*; 2:00 p.m., ESPN+ | | at UNC Asheville | W 65–63 | 4–7 | Kimmel Arena (263); Asheville, NC |
| December 21, 2023*; 2:00 p.m., FloHoops | | at UNC Wilmington | W 70–65 | 5–7 | Trask Coliseum (507); Wilmington, NC |
| December 31, 2023*; 1:00 p.m., ESPN+ | | at Furman | L 63–73 | 5–8 | Timmons Arena (366); Greenville, SC |
| January 3, 2024*; 7:00 p.m., ESPN+ | | at Chattanooga | L 59–65 | 5–9 | McKenzie Arena (1,301); Chattanooga, TN |
MEAC regular season
| January 6, 2024; 3:00 p.m., NCCUSN | | Howard | W 79–76 ^{OT} | 6–9 (1–0) | McDougald–McLendon Arena (783); Durham, NC |
| January 8, 2024; 5:30 p.m., NCCUSN | | Norfolk State | L 60–81 | 6–10 (1–1) | McDougald–McLendon Arena (649); Durham, NC |
| January 16, 2024*; 6:00 p.m., NCCUSN | | North Carolina Wesleyan | W 110–42 | 7–10 | McDougald–McLendon Arena (492); Durham, NC |
| January 20, 2024; 2:00 p.m. | | at South Carolina State | W 75–61 | 8–10 (2–1) | SHM Memorial Center (650); Orangeburg, SC |
| January 27, 2024; 3:15 p.m. | | at Maryland Eastern Shore | L 61–78 | 8–11 (2–2) | Hytche Athletic Center (183); Princess Anne, MD |
| January 29, 2024; 5:30 p.m. | | at Delaware State | W 64–58 | 9–11 (3–2) | Memorial Hall (450); Dover, DE |
| February 3, 2024; 2:00 p.m., NCCUSN | | Coppin State | W 53–48 | 10–11 (4–2) | McDougald–McLendon Arena (1,182); Durham, NC |
| February 5, 2024; 5:30 p.m., NCCUSN | | Morgan State | W 66–65 | 11–11 (5–2) | McDougald–McLendon Arena (942); Durham, NC |
| February 17, 2024; 1:00 p.m. | | at Howard | W 70–64 ^{OT} | 12–11 (6–2) | Burr Gymnasium (567); Washington, D.C. |
| February 19, 2024; 5:30 p.m. | | at Norfolk State | L 44–72 | 12–12 (6–3) | Joseph G. Echols Memorial Hall (1,723); Norfolk, VA |
| February 24, 2024; 2:00 p.m., NCCUSN | | Maryland Eastern Shore | L 64–71 | 12–13 (6–4) | McDougald–McLendon Arena (1,212); Durham, NC |
| February 26, 2024; 5:30 p.m., NCCUSN | | Delaware State | L 64–75 ^{OT} | 12–14 (6–5) | McDougald–McLendon Arena (1,019); Durham, NC |
| March 2, 2024; 2:00 p.m. | | at Coppin State | W 52–44 | 13–14 (7–5) | Physical Education Complex (411); Baltimore, MD |
| March 4, 2024; 5:30 p.m. | | at Morgan State | W 63–58 | 14–14 (8–5) | Talmadge L. Hill Field House (1,987); Baltimore, MD |
| March 7, 2024; 5:30 p.m., NCCUSN | | South Carolina State | W 73-54 | 15-14 (9-5) | McDougald–McLendon Arena (627); Durham, NC |
MEAC tournament
| March 14, 2024; 2:00 pm, ESPN+ | (3) | vs. (6) Delaware State; Quarterfinals | W 66-56 | 16-14 | Norfolk Scope (657); Norfolk, VA |
| March 15, 2024; 2:00 pm, ESPN+ | (3) | vs. (2) Howard; Semifinals | L 56-69 | 16-15 | Norfolk Scope (512); Norfolk, VA |
*Non-conference game. ^{#}Rankings from AP poll. (#) Tournament seedings in parentheses. All times are in Eastern.
