= 2023–24 Coppin State Eagles women's basketball team =

American college basketball season

2023–24 Coppin State Eagles women's basketball
- Conference: Mid-Eastern Athletic Conference
- Record: 12–18 (8–6 MEAC)
- Head coach: Jermaine Woods (2nd season)
- Associate head coach: Danielle Durjan
- Assistant coaches: Taariq Cephas; Lindsey Payton
- Home arena: Physical Education Complex

2023–24 MEAC women's basketball standings
	Conf.				Overall
Team	W		L	PCT	W		L	PCT
Norfolk State †	13	–	1	.929	27	–	6	.818
Howard	10	–	4	.714	15	–	16	.484
North Carolina Central	9	–	5	.643	16	–	15	.516
Maryland Eastern Shore	8	–	6	.571	15	–	15	.500
Coppin State	8	–	6	.571	12	–	18	.400
Delaware State	4	–	10	.286	8	–	20	.286
Morgan State	3	–	11	.214	8	–	22	.267
South Carolina State	1	–	13	.071	2	–	28	.067
† 2024 MEAC tournament winner

The 2023–24 Coppin State Eagles women's basketball team represented Coppin State University during the 2023–24 NCAA Division I women's basketball season. The Eagles, led by second-year head coach Jermaine Woods, played their home games at the Physical Education Complex in Baltimore, Maryland as members of the Mid-Eastern Athletic Conference (MEAC).

== Previous season ==
The Eagles finished the 2022–23 season 8–22, 5–9 in MEAC play, to finish in a three-way tie for fifth place. In the MEAC tournament, they were defeated by North Carolina Central in the quarterfinals.

== Roster ==
2023–24 Coppin State Eagles women's basketball team
Players
Coaches

Pos.	#	Name	Height	Year	Previous school	Hometown
G	1	Mossi Staples	5 ft 7 in (1.7 m)	RS Sr	Northeastern	Fort Washington, MD
G	2	Tiffany Hammond	5 ft 9 in (1.75 m)	RS Jr	CCBC Essex	Trenton, NJ
G	3	Madyson Burney	5 ft 7 in (1.7 m)	Fr	East River High School	Orlando, FL
G	5	Tyler Gray	5 ft 6 in (1.68 m)	RS Jr	CCBC Essex	Bladensburg, MD
G	11	Angel Jones	5 ft 4 in (1.63 m)	So	Siena	Alexandria, VA
G	12	Faith Blackstone	6 ft 0 in (1.83 m)	RS Jr	CCBC Essex	Harrisburg, PA
F	15	Charia Roberts	6 ft 0 in (1.83 m)	RS Jr	Loyola (MD)	Pikesville, MD
G	20	Niyah Gaston	5 ft 10 in (1.78 m)	Fr	King's Fork High School	Suffolk, VA
F	21	Colleen Bucknor	5 ft 11 in (1.8 m)	RS Jr	UCF	Miami, FL
F	23	Khya Jenkins	6 ft 0 in (1.83 m)	Jr	Millbrook School	Deer Park, NY
G	25	Cassandra Hawthorne	5 ft 11 in (1.8 m)	RS Jr	CCBC Essex	Hartford, CT
F	31	Laila Lawrence	6 ft 2 in (1.88 m)	Jr	Texas A&M–Commerce	Lewisville, TX

Head coach

- Jermaine Woods (Christopher Newport)

Assistant coach(es)

- Danielle Durjan (Towson)
- Taariq Cephas (Coppin State)
- Lindsey Payton (Arizona Christian)

Legend

- (C) Team captain
- (S) Suspended
- (I) Ineligible
- (W) Walk-on
- Injured
- Current redshirt

Roster
Last update: March 1, 2024

== Schedule and results ==
Date time, TV	Rank^{#}	Opponent^{#}	Result	Record	Site (attendance) city, state
Non-conference regular season
November 6, 2023*; 7:00 p.m.		La Salle	L 68–73	0–1	Physical Education Complex (541); Baltimore, MD
November 9, 2023*; 5:00 p.m.		Campbell	L 55–68	0–2	Physical Education Complex (462); Baltimore, MD
November 13, 2023*; 7:00 p.m., NEC Front Row		at Saint Francis	W 70–34	1–2	DeGol Arena (371); Loretto, PA
November 15, 2023*; 7:00 p.m., ACCNX		at Syracuse	L 47–80	1–3	JMA Wireless Dome (1,085); Syracuse, NY
November 18, 2023*; 1:00 p.m., ESPN+		at FIU	W 70–66	2–3	Ocean Bank Convocation Center (404); Miami, FL
November 21, 2023*; 11:00 a.m., ACCNX		at Pittsburgh	W 61–56	3–3	Petersen Events Center (3,155); Pittsburgh, PA
November 26, 2023*; 11:00 a.m., ESPN+		George Mason	L 38–70	3–4	Physical Education Complex (418); Baltimore, MD
November 29, 2023*; 7:00 p.m., ESPN+		at Kent State	L 40–77	3–5	MAC Center (1,077); Kent, OH
December 2, 2023*; 2:00 p.m., ESPN+		at East Carolina	L 51–59	3–6	Williams Arena (1,088); Greenville, NC
December 4, 2023*; 11:00 a.m., ESPN+		North Florida	L 43–49	3–7	Physical Education Complex (3,552); Baltimore, MD
December 9, 2023*; 2:00 p.m., ESPN+		at George Washington	L 41–55	3–8	Charles E. Smith Center (432); Washington, D.C.
December 17, 2023*; 2:00 p.m., ESPN+		at Binghamton	L 52–64	3–9	Binghamton University Events Center (909); Vestal, NY
December 20, 2023*; 6:00 p.m., ESPN+		No. 7 LSU	L 48–80	3–10	Physical Education Complex (4,100); Baltimore, MD
December 28, 2023*; 7:00 p.m., ACCNX		at Duke	L 34–68	3–11	Cameron Indoor Stadium (1,808); Durham, NC
MEAC regular season
January 6, 2024; 2:00 p.m.		at Delaware State	W 64–51	4–11 (1–0)	Memorial Hall (250); Dover, DE
January 8, 2024; 5:30 p.m., ESPN+		Maryland Eastern Shore	W 75–69	5–11 (2–0)	Physical Education Complex (389); Baltimore, MD
January 20, 2024; 2:00 p.m., ESPN+		Morgan State	W 67–47	6–11 (3–0)	Physical Education Complex (423); Baltimore, MD
January 27, 2024; 2:00 p.m.		at Norfolk State	L 53–61	6–12 (3–1)	Joseph G. Echols Memorial Hall (1,042); Norfolk, VA
January 29, 2024; 5:30 p.m., ESPN+		Howard	W 63–58	7–12 (4–1)	Physical Education Complex (478); Baltimore, MD
February 3, 2024; 2:00 p.m.		at North Carolina Central	L 48–53	7–13 (4–2)	McDougald–McLendon Arena (1,182); Durham, NC
February 5, 2024; 5:30 p.m.		at South Carolina State	W 63–39	8–13 (5–2)	SHM Memorial Center (220); Orangeburg, SC
February 17, 2024; 2:00 p.m., ESPN+		Delaware State	W 53–46	9–13 (6–2)	Physical Education Complex (304); Baltimore, MD
February 19, 2024; 5:30 p.m.		at Maryland Eastern Shore	L 51–73	9–14 (6–3)	Hytche Athletic Center (183); Princess Anne, MD
February 24, 2024; 2:00 p.m., ESPN+		Norfolk State	L 51–64	9–15 (6–4)	Physical Education Complex (876); Baltimore, MD
February 26, 2024; 5:30 p.m., ESPN+		at Howard	L 73–76	9–16 (6–5)	Burr Gymnasium (500); Washington, D.C.
March 2, 2024; 2:00 p.m., ESPN+		North Carolina Central	L 44–52	9–17 (6–6)	Physical Education Complex (411); Baltimore, MD
March 4, 2024; 5:30 p.m., ESPN+		South Carolina State	W 65–33	10–17 (7–6)	Physical Education Complex (327); Baltimore, MD
March 7, 2024; 5:30 p.m.		at Morgan State	W 65–45	11–17 (8–6)	Talmadge L. Hill Field House (1,073); Baltimore, MD
MEAC tournament
March 14, 2024; 12:00 p.m., ESPN+	(5)	vs. (4) Maryland Eastern Shore	W 61–55	12–17	Norfolk Scope (715); Norfolk, VA
March 15, 2024; 12:00 p.m., ESPN+	(5)	vs. (1) Norfolk State	L 44–73	12–18	Norfolk Scope (650); Norfolk, VA
*Non-conference game. ^{#}Rankings from AP poll. (#) Tournament seedings in parentheses. All times are in Eastern.
