= 2023–24 Delaware State Hornets women's basketball team =

American college basketball season

2023–24 Delaware State Hornets women's basketball
- Conference: Mid-Eastern Athletic Conference
- Record: 8–20 (4–10 MEAC)
- Head coach: Jazmone Turner (interim)
- Assistant coaches: Cherelle Dennis; Malick Kone
- Home arena: Memorial Hall

2023–24 MEAC women's basketball standings
	Conf.				Overall
Team	W		L	PCT	W		L	PCT
Norfolk State †	13	–	1	.929	27	–	6	.818
Howard	10	–	4	.714	15	–	16	.484
North Carolina Central	9	–	5	.643	16	–	15	.516
Maryland Eastern Shore	8	–	6	.571	15	–	15	.500
Coppin State	8	–	6	.571	12	–	18	.400
Delaware State	4	–	10	.286	8	–	20	.286
Morgan State	3	–	11	.214	8	–	22	.267
South Carolina State	1	–	13	.071	2	–	28	.067
† 2024 MEAC tournament winner

The 2023–24 Delaware State Hornets women's basketball team represented Delaware State University during the 2023–24 NCAA Division I women's basketball season. The Hornets, led by interim head coach Jazmone Turner, played their home games at Memorial Hall in Dover, Delaware as members of the Mid-Eastern Athletic Conference (MEAC). The team finished the season 8–20, 4–10 in MEAC play, to finish in sixth place.

== Previous season ==
The Hornets finished the 2022–23 season 7–19, 5–9 in MEAC play, to finish in a three-way tie for fifth place. In the MEAC tournament, they were defeated by Howard in the quarterfinals.

During the season, on February 17, 2023, it was announced that head coach E.C. Hill would be taking a leave of absence, with associate head coach Jazmone Turner being named acting head coach in Hill's absence, with Turner being named interim head coach for the 2023–24 season on June 23.

== Roster ==
2023–24 Delaware State Hornets women's basketball team
Players
Coaches

Pos.	#	Name	Height	Year	Previous school	Hometown
G	0	Idalis Lee	5 ft 11 in (1.8 m)	Sr	Hampton	Brooklyn, NY
G	1	Denijsha Wilson	5 ft 3 in (1.6 m)	GS	USC Upstate	Philadelphia, PA
G/F	2	Naomi Zulueta	5 ft 7 in (1.7 m)	So	Lancaster Catholic HS	Lancaster, PA
G	3	Kaitlyn Parker	5 ft 9 in (1.75 m)	GS	St. Bonaventure	Suitland, MD
G/F	4	Deyonce Thompson	5 ft 10 in (1.78 m)	So	East Kentwood HS	Grand Rapids, MI
PG	5	Kiarra Mcelrath	5 ft 7 in (1.7 m)	Fr	Bishop Hartley HS	Columbus, OH
F	10	Arianna Johnson	6 ft 1 in (1.85 m)	GS	Niagara	Grand Rapids, MI
G	11	Jaya Sheppard	5 ft 7 in (1.7 m)	Fr	Northland HS	Columbus, OH
G	14	Joy Watkins	5 ft 5 in (1.65 m)	Jr	Liberty	Henderson, NV
G	15	Cydney Curtis	5 ft 6 in (1.68 m)	So	Baltimore Polytech	Baltimore, MD
G	20	Ja'Naiah Perkins-Jackson	5 ft 6 in (1.68 m)	Sr	Cal State Dominguez Hills	Wilmington, DE
F	21	Victoria Eniafe	6 ft 0 in (1.83 m)	Jr	Grambling State	Upper Marlboro, MD
F	22	Tyshonne Tollie	6 ft 0 in (1.83 m)	Jr	Florida SouthWestern State	Bartow, FL
G/F	23	Savannah Brooks	5 ft 9 in (1.75 m)	So	Legacy Early College	Taneytown, MD
SG	24	Julia Saleur	5 ft 10 in (1.78 m)	So	Cape Henlopen HS	Nice, France
F	30	McKenzie Stewart	6 ft 0 in (1.83 m)	Fr	C.H. Flowers HS	Glenarden, MD
C	55	Circe Rubio Remolar	6 ft 2 in (1.88 m)	Fr	C.N. HELIOS A1	Zaragoza, Spain

Head coach

- Jazmone Turner (interim) (Muskingum)

Assistant coach(es)

- Cherelle Dennis (Lincoln)
- Malick Kone (Rutgers)

Legend

- (C) Team captain
- (S) Suspended
- (I) Ineligible
- (W) Walk-on
- Injured
- Current redshirt

Roster
Last update: March 2, 2024

== Schedule and results ==
Date time, TV	Rank^{#}	Opponent^{#}	Result	Record	Site (attendance) city, state
Non-conference regular season
November 6, 2023*; 4:00 p.m., ESPN+		at Temple	L 43–109	0–1	Liacouras Center (–); Philadelphia, PA
November 10, 2023*; 5:30 p.m.		Drexel	L 33–65	0–2	Memorial Hall (500); Dover, DE
November 12, 2023*; 2:00 p.m., ESPN+		at Richmond	L 44–105	0–3	Robins Center (909); Richmond, VA
November 15, 2023*; 11:30 a.m., FloHoops		at Hofstra	L 53–66	0–4	Mack Sports Complex (1,462); Hempstead, NY
November 22, 2023*; 12:00 p.m., FloHoops		at Stony Brook	L 41–86	0–5	Island Federal Arena (920); Stony Brook, NY
November 29, 2023*; 11:00 a.m.		at Rutgers	L 48–82	0–6	Jersey Mike's Arena (1,786); Piscataway, NJ
December 4, 2023*; 5:30 p.m.		LIU	W 84–59	1–6	Memorial Hall (400); Dover, DE
December 6, 2023*; 7:30 p.m.		at Wilmington	W 108–39	2–6	WU Athletics Complex (250); Newark, DE
December 10, 2023*; 2:00 p.m., ESPN+		at West Virginia	L 43–107	2–7	WVU Coliseum (1,522); Morgantown, WV
December 14, 2023*; 12:00 p.m., ESPN+		at No. 10 Baylor	L 37–99	2–8	Ferrell Center (9,898); Waco, TX
December 17, 2023*; 2:00 p.m.		New Jersey City	W 95–57	3–8	Memorial Hall (250); Dover, DE
December 21, 2023*; 2:00 p.m.		Delaware	W 69–66	4–8	Memorial Hall (250); Dover, DE
December 30, 2023*; 2:00 p.m.		Loyola (MD)	L 64–66	4–9	Memorial Hall (350); Dover, DE
MEAC regular season
January 6, 2024; 2:00 p.m.		Coppin State	L 51–64	4–10 (0–1)	Memorial Hall (250); Dover, DE
January 8, 2024; 5:30 p.m.		at Morgan State	W 73–71 ^{OT}	5–10 (1–1)	Talmadge L. Hill Field House (323); Baltimore, MD
January 20, 2024; 2:00 p.m.		Maryland Eastern Shore	L 45–76	5–11 (1–2)	Memorial Hall (500); Dover, DE
January 27, 2024; 3:15 p.m.		South Carolina State	W 61–49	6–11 (2–2)	Memorial Hall (650); Dover, DE
January 29, 2024; 5:30 p.m.		North Carolina Central	L 58–64	6–12 (2–3)	Memorial Hall (450); Dover, DE
February 3, 2024; 2:00 p.m.		at Norfolk State	L 52–79	6–13 (2–4)	Joseph G. Echols Memorial Hall (1,012); Norfolk, VA
February 5, 2024; 5:30 p.m.		Howard	L 57–69	6–14 (2–5)	Memorial Hall (550); Dover, DE
February 17, 2024; 2:00 p.m., ESPN+		at Coppin State	L 46–53	6–15 (2–6)	Physical Education Complex (304); Baltimore, MD
February 19, 2024; 5:30 p.m.		Morgan State	Postponed		Memorial Hall; Dover, DE
February 24, 2024; 2:00 p.m.		at South Carolina State	L 61–69	6–16 (2–7)	SHM Memorial Center (575); Orangeburg, SC
February 26, 2024; 5:30 p.m.		at North Carolina Central	W 75–64 ^{OT}	7–16 (3–7)	McDougald–McLendon Arena (1,019); Durham, NC
February 29, 2024; 5:30 p.m.		Morgan State; Rescheduled from February 19	W 57–53	8–16 (4–7)	Memorial Hall (250); Dover, DE
March 2, 2024; 2:00 p.m.		Norfolk State	L 51–65	8–17 (4–8)	Memorial Hall (750); Dover, DE
March 4, 2024; 5:30 p.m., ESPN+		at Howard	L 43–61	8–18 (4–9)	Burr Gymnasium (250); Washington, D.C.
March 7, 2024; 5:30 p.m.		at Maryland Eastern Shore	L 63-73	8-19 (4-10)	Hytche Athletic Center (183); Princess Anne, MD
MEAC tournament
March 14, 2024; 2:00 pm, ESPN+	(6)	vs. (3) North Carolina Central; Quarterfinals	L 56-66	8-20	Norfolk Scope (657); Norfolk, VA
*Non-conference game. ^{#}Rankings from AP poll. (#) Tournament seedings in parentheses. All times are in Eastern.
