= Norfolk State–Old Dominion rivalry =

American college sports rivalry

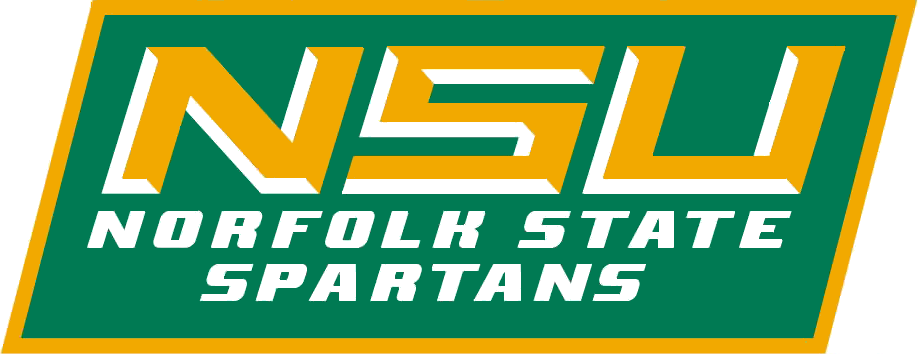
- Norfolk State Spartans Old Dominion Monarchs
- Sport: Multi-sport
- First meeting: December 20, 1965 (MBB)
- Latest meeting: November 11, 2026 (FB)

Statistics
- Total meetings: 109 (all sports)
- All-time series: ODU, 91–18 (all sports)

Locations of Norfolk State and Old Dominion in Norfolk, Virginia.

The Norfolk State–Old Dominion rivalry (known by the Scope Series in basketball) refers to games between the Norfolk State Spartans of MEAC and the Old Dominion Monarchs of the Sun Belt Conference. The two schools are the only NCAA Division I schools in Norfolk, Virginia.

The rivalry has been described as an "intense but friendly cross-town rivalry".

== History ==
Both universities have their origins in the 1930s. Old Dominion University formed as the Norfolk branch of the College of William & Mary in 1930, while Norfolk State University formed as the Norfolk branch of Virginia Union University in 1935.

In 1942, Norfolk State became independent of VSU, while Old Dominion became independent of William & Mary in 1962. The first known meeting between the two schools in any varsity sport came in 1965, when the two men's basketball programs met. The game was held at the Rockwell Hall Gymnasium and won by Old Dominion, 86–82. The two programs regularly met from the late 1960s until early 1980s. In the late 1960s and early 1970s, the series was dominated by Norfolk State, and in the late 1970s through 1980s the rivalry was dominated by Old Dominion. During this period, both schools played at the NCAA Division II level, with much success. In 1975, Old Dominion won the NCAA Division II men's basketball tournament. Since 1981 though, the men's basketball programs have met only four times, most recently at the neutral-site Norfolk Scope in 2017, which has called local media to see the series become an annual affair at the Scope. Head coach, Jeff Jones, of ODU has said he sees no plans to broaden the "Scope Series". Much of this attributes to the Spartan's traditionally weak conference and low RPI, and playing at a neutral venue, and the politics that is associated with that.

Although the men's basketball series has been more dormant, the two baseball programs have regularly played each other on a home-and-home series since the mid 1990s. The series has largely favored Old Dominion who hold a 31–8 advantage over Norfolk State. The two football programs have met regularly in the 2010s once Old Dominion reestablished their football program.

== All-time series results ==
Sport	All-time series record	Last result	Next meeting	Source
Baseball	ODU leads 45–9	ODU won 16-4 on March 18, 2026	TBD	
Men's basketball	ODU leads 17–6	ODU won 71–60 on November 11, 2026	2027 at ODU	
Women's basketball	ODU leads 24–3	ODU won 65–44 on December 11, 2022	TBD	
Football	ODU leads 5–0	ODU won 31–10 on September 5, 2026	09/04/26 at ODU	

== Football ==
Norfolk State and Old Dominion played for the first time on November 26, 2011, in the first round of the FCS playoffs which resulted in a 35–18 Spartan loss. Old Dominion and NSU announced a new deal for a home and away series in 2013 and 2015 to help fill out open game dates for ODU's transition to the FBS. ODU plays at Foreman Field; NSU at Dick Price Stadium.

Norfolk State victories	Old Dominion victories	Tie games

No.	Date	Location	Winning team		Losing team		Series
1	November 26, 2011	Foreman Field	#10 (FCS) Old Dominion	35	#19 (FCS) Norfolk State	18	Old Dominion 1–0
2	October 26, 2013	Dick Price Stadium	Old Dominion	27	Norfolk State	24	Old Dominion 2–0
3	September 12, 2015	Foreman Field	Old Dominion	24	Norfolk State	10	Old Dominion 3–0
4	August 31, 2019	S.B. Ballard Stadium	Old Dominion	24	Norfolk State	21	Old Dominion 4–0
5	September 5, 2026	S.B. Ballard Stadium	Old Dominion	31	Norfolk State	10	Old Dominion 5–0

== Basketball ==
=== Men's basketball ===
Norfolk State victories	Old Dominion victories

No.	Date	Location	Winner	Score
1	December 20, 1965	Rockwell Hall Gym	Old Dominion	86–82
2	March 8, 1969	Norfolk Scope	Norfolk State	113–102
3	February 23, 1970	ODU Fieldhouse	Norfolk State	123–112
4	December 17, 1970	Gill Gymnasium	Old Dominion	98–90
5	January 11, 1971	ODU Fieldhouse	Old Dominion	102–97
6	March 13, 1971	Norfolk Scope	Old Dominion	102–97
7	December 9, 1971	ODU Fieldhouse	Norfolk State	122–119^{OT}
8	February 11, 1972	Gill Gymnasium	Old Dominion	105–101^{OT}
9	December 18, 1972	Gill Gymnasium	Norfolk State	88–74
10	February 7, 1973	ODU Fieldhouse	Old Dominion	97–96
11	March 9, 1974	ODU Fieldhouse	Norfolk State	89–76
12	January 10, 1978	Norfolk Scope	Old Dominion	94–81

No.	Date	Location	Winner	Score
13	January 16, 1980	Norfolk Scope	Old Dominion	60–57
14	December 6, 1980	Norfolk Scope	Old Dominion	80–63
15	December 3, 1981	Norfolk Scope	Old Dominion	76–61
16	December 29, 1999	ODU Fieldhouse	Norfolk State	67–64
17	January 25, 2001	Norfolk Scope	Old Dominion	69–62
18	December 29, 2015	Chartway Arena	Old Dominion	68–57
19	December 22, 2017	Norfolk Scope	Old Dominion	61–50
20	December 2, 2020	Echols Hall	Old Dominion	80–66
21	December 3, 2022	Chartway Arena	Old Dominion	68–62
22	November 11, 2025	Chartway Arena	Old Dominion	60–57
23	November 11, 2026	Echols Hall	Old Dominion	71–60
Series: Old Dominion leads 17–6

== Baseball ==
Old Dominion baseball plays their home games at the Ellmer Family Baseball Complex at Bud Metheny Ballpark, where they have played since 1983. Norfolk State baseball plays their home games at Marty L. Miller Field, where they have played since 1997. Prior to the opening of both venues, Old Dominion played at Foreman Field, and Norfolk State alternated between Harbor Park and Met Park.

Norfolk State victories	Old Dominion victories

No.	Date	Location	Winner	Score
1	April 24, 1979	Met Park	Old Dominion	5–3
2	March, 1981	Foreman Field	Old Dominion	9–7
3	April 5, 1981	Foreman Field	Old Dominion	16–3
4	April 27, 1981	Met Park	Norfolk State	6–5
5	April 28, 1981	Met Park	Old Dominion	8–1
6	April 10, 1982	Met Park	Old Dominion	13–4
7	May 5, 1982	Foreman Field	Old Dominion	8–1
8	April 26, 1983	Met Park	Old Dominion	13–3
9	May 8, 1983	Metheny Ballpark	Old Dominion	6–5
10	March 17, 1984	Met Park	Norfolk State	7–6
11	April 21, 1984	Met Park	Old Dominion	13–1
12	April 14, 1985	Metheny Ballpark	Old Dominion	10–3
13	May 9, 1985	Metheny Ballpark	Old Dominion	6–1
14	March 24, 1986	Metheny Ballpark	Old Dominion	14–0
15	April 11, 1986	Met Park	Old Dominion	4–3
16	March 28, 1990	Metheny Ballpark	Old Dominion	10–9
17	May 3, 1998	Metheny Ballpark	Old Dominion	21–5
18	April 1, 1999	Metheny Ballpark	Old Dominion	12–5
19	April 26, 1999	Miller Field	Old Dominion	13–5
20	March 14, 2000	Metheny Ballpark	Old Dominion	31–1
21	May 9, 2000	Miller Field	Old Dominion	7–3
22	April 16, 2001	Metheny Ballpark	Old Dominion	15–3
23	May 3, 2001	Miller Field	Old Dominion	7–2
24	April 28, 2002	Metheny Ballpark	Old Dominion	8–2
25	April 29, 2002	Miller Field	Old Dominion	2–0
26	April 5, 2003	Miller Field	Norfolk State	8–6
27	May 2, 2003	Metheny Ballpark	Old Dominion	13–2
28	May 7, 2004	Metheny Ballpark	Old Dominion	13–2

No.	Date	Location	Winner	Score
29	March 6, 2005	Metheny Ballpark	Old Dominion	10–7
30	February 21, 2006	Miller Field	Old Dominion	10–2
31	May 3, 2006	Metheny Ballpark	Old Dominion	8–2
32	March 12, 2007	Metheny Ballpark	Norfolk State	2–1
33	April 23, 2007	Miller Field	Old Dominion	3–0
34	March 12, 2008	Metheny Ballpark	Old Dominion	11–5
35	March 26, 2008	Miller Field	Norfolk State	10–5
36	March 23, 2010	Miller Field	Norfolk State	12–5
37	April 13, 2010	Metheny Ballpark	Old Dominion	20–5
38	April 6, 2011	Metheny Ballpark	Old Dominion	13–5
39	March 28, 2012	Metheny Ballpark	Norfolk State	7–5
40	April 17, 2012	Harbor Park	Old Dominion	11–8
41	May 10, 2013	Metheny Ballpark	Old Dominion	8–3
42	May 11, 2013	Miller Field	Norfolk State	4–2
43	February 23, 2016	Metheny Ballpark	Old Dominion	5–3
44	March 6, 2018	Metheny Ballpark	Old Dominion	9–1
45	February 26, 2019	Metheny Ballpark	Old Dominion	11–0
46	March 10, 2020	Metheny Ballpark	Norfolk State	8–4
47	February 20, 2021	Metheny Ballpark	Old Dominion	7–1
48	February 21, 2021	Metheny Ballpark	Old Dominion	12–0
49	February 23, 2021	Metheny Ballpark	Old Dominion	12–5
50	February 24, 2021	Metheny Ballpark	Old Dominion	19–2
51	March 7, 2023	Metheny Ballpark	Old Dominion	16–7
52	April 8, 2025	Miller Field	Old Dominion	12–8
53	February 25, 2026	Miller Field	Old Dominion	15–0 (7 inn.)
54	March 18, 2026	Metheny Ballpark	Old Dominion	16–4 (7 inn.)
Series: Old Dominion leads 45–9

== See also ==
- List of NCAA college football rivalry games
- Battle of the Bay (Hampton–Norfolk State)
- Old Dominion–William & Mary rivalry
