= 2026 Maryland Eastern Shore Hawks men's volleyball team =

2026 Maryland Eastern Shore Hawks men's volleyball
- Conference: Northeast Conference
- Record: 14-9 (4-4 NEC)
- Head coach: Dr. Anitra Brockman (1st season)
- Assistant coach: Chey Cooper (1st season)
- Home stadium: Hytche Center

The 2026 Maryland Eastern Shore Hawks men's volleyball team is the varsity intercollegiate volleyball program of the University of Maryland, Eastern Shore (UMES). The 2026 season marks the inaugural season of the program. The Hawks, led by first year head coach Dr. Anitra Brockman, play their home games in the Hytche Center located on the campus in Princess Anne, Maryland. UMES has been an associate member of the Northeast Conference (NEC) since the start of the 2026 season.

2026 Northeast Conference men's volleyball standings
	Conf.				Overall
Team	W		L	PCT	W		L	PCT
FDU ‍‍‍	6	–	2	.750	12	–	9	.571
Saint Francis ‍‍‍	6	–	2	.750	12	–	11	.522
Manhattan ‍‍‍	6	–	4	.600	9	–	14	.391
Maryland Eastern Shore ‍‍‍	4	–	4	.500	14	–	9	.609
Daemen ‍‍‍	5	–	5	.500	12	–	12	.500
LIU ‍‍‍	3	–	5	.375	11	–	13	.458
D'Youville ‍‍‍	0	–	8	.000	2	–	20	.091
† – Conference champion ‡ – Northeast Conference tournament champion As of April 6, 2026; Rankings from AVCA

== Preseason ==
The Northeast Conference preseason poll was released on January 6, 2026. UMES was picked to finish sixth in the conference.

=== Northeast Conferences Coaches' Poll ===
Coaches' Poll
Pos.	Team	Points
T-1	Daemen	3
T-1	Saint Francis	2
3	Long Island	1
4	Fairleigh Dickinson	1
5	Manhattan	—
6	Maryland Eastern Shore	—
7	D'Youville	—

== Roster ==
2026 Maryland Eastern Shore Hawks Roster
No.	Name	Position	Height	Year	Hometown
1	Jeremy Coleman	OH	6'3"	Fr.	Bloomington, IL
2	John Howard III	OH	6'3"	Fr.	Pleasantville, NJ
3	Marcellus Owens	OH	6'2"	Fr.	Atlanta, GA
4	Tavion Ford	OH	6'1"	Sr.	Belize City, Belize
5	Jordan Brockman	S	5'9"	So.	Cincinnati, OH
7	Jaxon Clark	OPP	6'2"	Fr.	Atlanta, GA
8	Jarrett Key	L	5'9"	Fr.	Boca Raton, FL
9	Tristan Rowley	OH/OPP	6'6"	Fr.	Denver, CO
10	Drew Johnson	OPP	6'5"	Fr.	Joliet, IL
11	Kenyon Haynes	S	6'2"	5th	Chicago, IL
15	Chase Valetine	MB	6'4"	Fr.	Kaysville, UT
16	Andre Mils	OPP	6'4"	Jr.	Ft. Lauderdale, FL
17	Edward Piloton Jr	L	5'8"	Jr.	Honolulu, HI
18	Curtis Tom	S	6'2"	Fr.	Danville, CA
19	Gabriel McWhite	MB/OH	6'1"	So.	Baltimore, MD
20	Romel McCloud	OH	6'1"	Fr.	Turner, OR
21	Nikilas Blumenstock	MB/OH	6'3"	Fr.	Dayton, OH
23	Joshua Hightower	OH	5'10"	Fr.	Irvine, CA

=== Coaches ===
2026 Maryland Eastern Shore Hawks Coaching Staff
Position	Name	Season
Head Coach	Dr. Anitra Brockman	1st
Assistant coach	Chey Cooper	1st

== Schedule ==
2026 Maryland Eastern Shore Hawks Schedule 14-9 (4-4 NEC)
Date Time	Opponents	Stadiums	Scores	Sets	Attendance	Overall	NEC
Jan. 5 10:00 pm	@ UPR Rio Piedras	San Juan, PR	W, 3-2	25-22 17–25 25–18 24–26 15-7	35	1-0	—
Jan. 8 6:00 pm	@ UPR Rio Piedras	San Juan, PR	—	—	—	—	—
Jan. 14 6:00 pm	Virginia Wesleyan	Hytche Center Princess Anne, MD	W, 3-1	25-11 23-25 25-15 25-17	742	2-0	—
Jan. 22 6:00 pm	@ Erskine College	Belk Arena Due West, SC	W, 3-0	25-14 25-19 26-24	6671	3-0	—
Jan. 23 12:00 am	@ Erskine College	Belk Arena Due West, SC	W, 3-0	25-22 26-24 25-21	78	4-0	—
Jan. 25 12:00 pm	@ Emmanuel		Cancelled			4-0	—
Uvaldo Acosta Memorial Tournament presented by George Mason
Jan. 30 6:00 am	No. 10 Ball State	Recreation Athletic Complex Fairfax, VA	L, 0-3	16-25 19-25 15-25	53	4-1	—
Jan. 31 2:00 pm	Mount Olive	Recreation Athletic Complex Fairfax, VA	Cancelled			4-1	—
Jan. 31 2:00 pm	@ George Mason	Recreation Athletic Complex Fairfax, VA	L, 1-3	18-25 23-25 25-18 22-25	235	4-2	—
Feb. 6 6:00 pm	Dominican (N.Y.)	Hytche Center Princess Anne, MD	W, 3-0	25-21 25-13 25-21	550	5-2	—
Feb. 6 6:00 pm	Dominican (N.Y.)	Hytche Center Princess Anne, MD	W, 3-1	22-25 25-17 25-14 25-18	777	6-2	—
Feb. 10 7:00 pm	@ Thomas More	Connor Convocation Center Crestview Hills, KY	W, 3-1	25-13 25-12 27-29 25-16	42	7-2	—
Feb. 12 7:00 pm	@ Northern Kentucky	Regent Hall Highland Heights, KY	L, 0-3	12-25 22-25 20-25	134	7-3	—
Feb. 13 4:00 pm	Oakland City	Bell Gymnasium Frankfort, KY	L, 1-3	22-25 25-21 20-25 23-25	51	7-4	—
Feb. 13 6:00 pm	@ Kentucky State	Bell Gymnasium Frankfort, KY	W, 3-0	25-12 25-15 25-18	75	8-4	—
Feb. 14 1:00 pm	@ Central State	Beacom/Lewis Gym Wilberforce, OH	L, 1-3	26-24 29-31 21-25 19-25	96	8-5	—
Feb. 18 6:00 pm	Roberts Wesleyan	Hytche Center Princess Anne, MD	W, 3-0	25-19 25-23 25-23	400	9-5	—
Feb. 19 12:00 pm	Roberts Wesleyan	Hytche Center Princess Anne, MD	W, 3-1	25-22 25-17 23-25 25-20	200	10-5	—
Northeast Conference Matches
Feb. 26 12:00 pm	D'Youvile	Hytche Center Princess Anne, MD	W, 3-0	25-21 25-10 25-13	100	11-5	1-0
Feb. 27 6:00 pm	D'Youville	Hytche Center Princess Anne, MD	W, 3-1	25-23 25-15 22-25 25-22	560	12-5	2-0
Mar. 13 6:00 pm	@ Saint Francis	DeGol Arena Loretto, PA	L, 0-3	22-25 16-25 19-25	137	12-6	2-1
Mar. 14 5:00 pm	@ Saint Francis	DeGol Arena Loretto, PA	L, 0-3	22-25 23-25 17-25	152	12-7	2-2
Mar. 27 6:00 pm	@ Daemen	Lumsden Gymnasium Amherst, NY	L, 0-3	25-27 15-25 23-25	137	12-8	2-3
Mar. 28 2:00 pm	@ Daemen	Lumsden Gymnasium Amherst, NY	L, 1-3	25-16 20-25 21-25 23-25	97	12-9	2-4
Apr. 3 6:00 pm	LIU	Hytche Center Princess Anne, MD	W, 3-2	25-21 25-21 22-25 20-25 15-11	500	13-9	3-4
Apr. 4 1:00 pm	LIU	Hytche Center Princess Anne, MD	W, 3-0	25-22 25-15 25-15	454	14-9	4-4
Apr. 10 6:00 pm	@ FDU	Teaneck, NJ				-	
Apr. 11 1:00 pm	@ FDU	Teaneck, NJ				-	
Apr. 17 6:00 pm	Manhattan	Hytche Center Princess Anne, MD				-	
Apr.18 2:00 pm	Manhattan	Hytche Center Princess Anne, MD				-	

Time: Atlantic Standard Time
