= 2024 MEAC women's basketball tournament =

US collegiate basketball tournament

- Classification: Division I
- Season: 2023–24
- Teams: 8
- Site: Norfolk Scope; Norfolk, Virginia
- Champions: Norfolk State (3rd title)
- Winning coach: Larry Vickers (2nd title)
- Television: ESPN+

2023–24 MEAC women's basketball standings
	Conf.				Overall
Team	W		L	PCT	W		L	PCT
Norfolk State †	13	–	1	.929	27	–	6	.818
Howard	10	–	4	.714	15	–	16	.484
North Carolina Central	9	–	5	.643	16	–	15	.516
Maryland Eastern Shore	8	–	6	.571	15	–	15	.500
Coppin State	8	–	6	.571	12	–	18	.400
Delaware State	4	–	10	.286	8	–	20	.286
Morgan State	3	–	11	.214	8	–	22	.267
South Carolina State	1	–	13	.071	2	–	28	.067
† 2024 MEAC tournament winner

The 2024 MEAC women's basketball tournament is the postseason women's basketball tournament for the 2023–24 season in the Mid-Eastern Athletic Conference (MEAC). The tournament will take place during March 13–16, 2024. The tournament winner received the conference's automatic invitation to the 2024 NCAA Division I women's basketball tournament.

== Seeds ==
All 8 teams are eligible for the tournament and will be seeded by record within the conference, with a tiebreaker system to seed teams with identical conference records.

Seed	School	Conference	Tiebreaker
1	Norfolk State	13–1	
2	Howard	10–4	
3	North Carolina Central	9–5	
4	Maryland Eastern Shore	8–6	2–0 vs. NCCU
5	Coppin State	8–6	0–2 vs. NCCU
6	Delaware State	4–10	
7	Morgan State	3–11	
8	South Carolina State	1–13	

== Schedule ==
Game	Time*	Matchup^{#}	Score	Television
Quarterfinals – Wednesday, March 13
1	12:00 p.m.	No. 1 Norfolk State vs. No. 8 South Carolina State	75–43	ESPN+
2	2:00 p.m.	No. 2 Howard vs. No. 7 Morgan State	49–44	ESPN+
Quarterfinals – Thursday, March 14
3	12:00 p.m.	No. 4 Maryland Eastern Shore vs. No. 5 Coppin State	55–61	ESPN+
4	2:00 p.m.	No. 3 North Carolina Central vs. No. 6 Delaware State	66–56	ESPN+
Semifinals – Friday, March 15
5	12:00 p.m.	No. 1 Norfolk State vs. No. 5 Coppin State	73–44	ESPN+
6	2:00 p.m.	No. 2 Howard vs. No. 3 North Carolina Central	69–56	ESPN+
Championship – Saturday, March 16
7	4:00 p.m.	No. 1 Norfolk State vs. No. 2 Howard	51–46	ESPN+
*Game times in EST. #-Rankings denote tournament seeding.

== Bracket ==
Quarterfinals; March 13–14; ESPN+
1	Norfolk State	75
8	South Carolina State	43
4	Maryland Eastern Shore	55
5	Coppin State	64
2	Howard	49
7	Morgan State	44
3	North Carolina Central	66
6	Delaware State	56

Semifinals; March 15; ESPN+
1	Norfolk State	73
5	Coppin State	44
2	Howard	69
3	North Carolina Central	56

Championship; March 16; ESPN+
1	Norfolk State	51
2	Howard	46
