= 2023–24 Duke Blue Devils women's basketball team =

Intercollegiate basketball season

2023–24 Duke Blue Devils women's basketball

NCAA tournament, Sweet Sixteen
- Conference: Atlantic Coast Conference

Ranking
- Coaches: No. 21
- AP: No. 17
- Record: 22–12 (11–7 ACC)
- Head coach: Kara Lawson (4th season)
- Assistant coaches: Tia Jackson; Karen Lange; Karen Middleton; Pierre Miller
- Home arena: Cameron Indoor Stadium

2023–24 ACC women's basketball standings
	Conf.				Overall
Team	W		L	PCT	W		L	PCT
No. 18 Virginia Tech	14	–	4	.778	25	–	8	.758
No. 4 NC State	13	–	5	.722	31	–	7	.816
No. 20 Syracuse	13	–	5	.722	24	–	8	.750
No. 11 Notre Dame †	13	–	5	.722	28	–	7	.800
Louisville	12	–	6	.667	24	–	10	.706
Florida State	12	–	6	.667	23	–	11	.676
No. 17 Duke	11	–	7	.611	22	–	12	.647
North Carolina	11	–	7	.611	20	–	13	.606
Miami (FL)	8	–	10	.444	19	–	12	.613
Georgia Tech	7	–	11	.389	17	–	16	.515
Virginia	7	–	11	.389	16	–	16	.500
Clemson	5	–	13	.278	12	–	19	.387
Boston College	5	–	13	.278	14	–	19	.424
Wake Forest	2	–	16	.111	7	–	25	.219
Pittsburgh	2	–	16	.111	8	–	24	.250
† 2024 ACC tournament winner Rankings from AP poll

The 2023–24 Duke Blue Devils women's basketball team represented Duke University during the 2023–24 NCAA Division I women's basketball season. The Blue Devils were led by fourth-year head coach Kara Lawson and played their home games at Cameron Indoor Stadium in Durham, North Carolina as members of the Atlantic Coast Conference.

The Blue Devils started their season with three straight wins before losing two straight games, including an overtime loss at sixth-ranked Stanford. They won their next two games, including another overtime victory, this time against Georgia in the ACC–SEC Challenge. Duke lost its next two games, one against first-ranked South Carolina and the other, its ACC opener at Clemson. From there, the Blue Devils closed out their non-conference schedule with three straight wins, and won three of their next four ACC games. The lone loss was at seventeenth-ranked Louisville. Their next three conference games were against ranked teams, and Duke won two of the three. They defeated fourteenth ranked Virginia Tech and twenty-third ranked Florida State, but lost to fourth-ranked NC State. Duke won three of the next four games, and closed the season out by winning three games and losing three games. Losses came against twelfth-ranked Virginia Tech and nineteenth-ranked Notre Dame, while they defeated seventeenth-ranked Syracuse and sixth-ranked NC State. The Blue Devils split the season series with rivals North Carolina, winning in overtime at home and losing in Chapel Hill on the final day of the season.

The Blue Devils finished the season 22–12 overall and 11–7 in ACC play to finish in a tie for seventh place. As the seventh seed in the ACC tournament, they defeated tenth seed Georgia Tech in the second round before losing to NC State in the quarterfinals. They received an at-large bid to the NCAA Tournament, marking the second straight year the Blue Devils qualified for the tournament. As the seventh seed in the Portland 3 region, they defeated tenth seed Richmond in the first round and upset second seed Ohio State in the second round, before losing to third seed Connecticut in the Sweet Sixteen to end their season.

== Previous season ==
The Blue Devils finished the season 26–7 overall and 14–4 in ACC play to finish in a tie for second place. As the second seed in the ACC tournament, they earned a bye into the quarterfinals, where they defeated rivals seventh seeded North Carolina before falling to eventual champions and third seed Virginia Tech in the semifinals. They received an at-large bid to the NCAA Tournament and were the third seed in the Seattle 4 Region. They defeated fourteen seed Iona in the first round before being upset by sixth seed Colorado in the second round, in overtime, to end their season.

== Off-season ==
=== Departures ===
Departures
Name	Number	Pos.	Height	Year	Hometown	Reason for departure
Celeste Taylor	0	G	5'11"	Senior	Valley Stream, New York	Graduated, transferred to Ohio State
Elizabeth Balogun	4	G/F	6'1"	Senior	Lagos, Nigeria	Graduated
Taya Corosdale	5	G/F	6'3"	Graduate student	Bothell, Washington	Graduated
Jordyn Oliver	11	G	5'10"	(redshirt) Junior	Prosper, Texas	Graduated, transferred to Vanderbilt
Lee Volker	13	G	5'11"	Sophomore	Purcellville, Virginia	Transferred to Marquette
Shay Bollin	21	F	6'3"	Freshman	Raynham, Massachusetts	Transferred to Illinois
Imani Lewis	22	F	6'1"	Graduate student	Willingboro, New Jersey	Graduated
Shayeann Day-Wilson	30	G	5'6"	Sophomore	Toronto, Canada	Transferred to Miami (FL)
Bo Shaffer	32	G	5'7"	Graduate student	Lakewood, Colorado	Graduated
Jiselle Havas	33	G	5'10"	Graduate student	Windermere, Florida	Graduated
Mia Heide	42	F	6'3"	Graduate student	Austin, Texas	Graduated
Emma Schmidt	45	G	5'9"	Graduate student	Waukee, Iowa	Graduated

=== Incoming transfers ===
Incoming transfers
Name	Number	Pos.	Height	Year	Hometown	Previous school
Camilla Emsbo	21	F	6'5"	Graduate student	Lakewood, Colorado	Yale

=== Recruiting class ===
College recruiting
Name	Hometown	School	Height	Weight	Commit date
Jadyn Donovan; G/F	Washington, D.C.	Sidwell Friends	6 ft 0 in (1.83 m)	N/A	
Jadyn Donovan; G/F	Recruit ratings: ESPN: (97)				
Oluchi Okananwa; G	Boston, Massachusetts	Worcester Academy	5 ft 10 in (1.78 m)	N/A	
Oluchi Okananwa; G	Recruit ratings: ESPN: (95)				
Delaney Thomas; F	Charles Town, West Virginia	St. John's College	6 ft 3 in (1.91 m)	N/A	
Delaney Thomas; F	Recruit ratings: ESPN: (95)				
Jordan Wood; F	Chicago, Illinois	Carmel	6 ft 4 in (1.93 m)	N/A	
Jordan Wood; F	Recruit ratings: ESPN: (93)				
Overall recruit ranking:
Note: In many cases, Scout, Rivals, 247Sports, On3, and ESPN may conflict in their listings of height and weight.; In these cases, the average was taken. ESPN grades are on a 100-point scale.; Sources:

== Roster ==
2023–24 Duke Blue Devils women's basketball team
Players
Coaches

Pos.	#	Name	Height	Year	Previous school	Hometown
G	2	Vanessa de Jesus	5 ft 8 in (1.73 m)	Sr	Sierra Canyon	Valencia, CA
G	3	Ashlon Jackson	6 ft 0 in (1.83 m)	So	Hardin-Jefferson	China, TX
G/F	4	Jadyn Donovan	6 ft 0 in (1.83 m)	Fr	Sidwell Friends	Washington, D.C.
G	5	Oluchi Okananwa	5 ft 10 in (1.78 m)	Fr	Worcester Academy	Boston, MA
F	12	Delaney Thomas	6 ft 3 in (1.91 m)	Fr	St. John's College	Charles Town, WV
F	13	Jordan Wood	6 ft 4 in (1.93 m)	Fr	Carmel	Chicago, IL
G	15	Emma Koabel	5 ft 11 in (1.8 m)	So	Niagara Prep	Port Colborne, ON
F	21	Camilla Emsbo	6 ft 5 in (1.96 m)	GS	Lakewood; Yale	Lakewood, CO
G	22	Taina Mair	5 ft 9 in (1.75 m)	So	Brooks School; Boston College	Boston, MA
G	24	Reigan Richardson	5 ft 11 in (1.8 m)	Jr	Cannon School; Georgia	Charlotte, NC
C	42	Kennedy Brown	6 ft 6 in (1.98 m)	Sr	Derby; Oregon State	Derby, KS

Head coach

- Kara Lawson (Tennessee)

Assistant coach(es)

- Tia Jackson (Iowa)
- Karen Lange (Iowa)
- Karen Middleton (South Carolina)
- Pierre Miller (Presbyterian)

Legend

- (C) Team captain
- (S) Suspended
- (I) Ineligible
- (W) Walk-on
- Injured
- Current redshirt

Roster
Last update: October 29, 2023

== Schedule ==
Date time, TV	Rank^{#}	Opponent^{#}	Result	Record	Site (attendance) city, state
Exhibition
November 4, 2023*; 1:00 p.m.		Wingate	W 106–33	–	Cameron Indoor Stadium (2,078); Durham, NC
November 12, 2023*; 12:00 p.m., ACCNX		USA Basketball	L 58–87	–	Cameron Indoor Stadium (3,357); Durham, NC
Regular season
November 6, 2023*; 11:00 a.m., ACCNX		Richmond	W 83–53	1–0	Cameron Indoor Stadium (1,864); Durham, NC
November 9, 2023*; 7:00 p.m., ACCNX		Coastal Carolina	W 88–42	2–0	Cameron Indoor Stadium (1,027); Durham, NC
November 14, 2023*; 6:00 p.m., ESPN+		at Columbia	W 66–62	3–0	Levien Gymnasium (2,027); New York, NY
November 16, 2023*; 7:00 p.m., ACCNX		Davidson	L 62–69	3–1	Cameron Indoor Stadium (1,083); Durham, NC
November 19, 2023*; 3:00 p.m., ABC		at No. 6 Stanford	L 79–82 ^{OT}	3–2	Maples Pavilion (4,236); Stanford, CA
November 26, 2023*; 2:00 p.m., ACCNX		North Carolina Central	W 93–45	4–2	Cameron Indoor Stadium (1,211); Durham, NC
November 30, 2023*; 5:00 p.m., SECN		at Georgia; ACC–SEC Challenge	W 72–65 ^{OT}	5–2	Stegeman Coliseum (2,446); Athens, GA
December 3, 2023*; 1:00 p.m., ABC		No. 1 South Carolina; Jimmy V Classic	L 61–77	5–3	Cameron Indoor Stadium (5,607); Durham, NC
December 7, 2023; 7:00 p.m., ACCN		at Clemson	L 64–80	5–4 (0–1)	Littlejohn Coliseum (910); Clemson, SC
December 10, 2023*; 12:00 p.m., ACCN		Florida Gulf Coast	W 82–63	6–4	Cameron Indoor Stadium (1,573); Durham, NC
December 20, 2023*; 7:00 p.m., ACCNX		Toledo	W 70–45	7–4	Cameron Indoor Stadium (1,482); Durham, NC
December 28, 2023*; 7:00 p.m., ACCNX		Coppin State	W 68–34	8–4	Cameron Indoor Stadium (1,808); Durham, NC
December 31, 2023; 2:00 p.m., ACCNX		Boston College	W 80–75	9–4 (1–1)	Cameron Indoor Stadium (1,898); Durham, NC
January 4, 2024; 8:00 p.m., ACCN		at No. 17 Louisville	L 44–61	9–5 (1–2)	KFC Yum! Center (7,789); Louisville, KY
January 7, 2024; 12:00 p.m., The CW		at Virginia	W 60–56	10–5 (2–2)	John Paul Jones Arena (5,041); Charlottesville, VA
January 14, 2024; 2:00 p.m., ACCNX		Georgia Tech	W 84–46	11–5 (3–2)	Cameron Indoor Stadium (2,362); Durham, NC
January 18, 2024; 8:00 p.m., ACCN		No. 14 Virginia Tech	W 63–46	12–5 (4–2)	Cameron Indoor Stadium (2,217); Durham, NC
January 21, 2024; 12:00 p.m., ACCN		at No. 4 NC State; Rivalry	L 57–72	12–6 (4–3)	Reynolds Coliseum (5,500); Raleigh, NC
January 25, 2024; 6:00 p.m., ACCN		No. 23 Florida State	W 88–46	13–6 (5–3)	Cameron Indoor Stadium (1,779); Durham, NC
January 28, 2024; 2:00 p.m., ACCN		at Miami (FL)	L 58–64	13–7 (5–4)	Watsco Center (3,112); Coral Gables, FL
February 1, 2024; 7:00 p.m., ACCNX		at Pittsburgh	W 69–38	14–7 (6–4)	Peterson Events Center (1,199); Pittsburgh, PA
February 8, 2024; 7:00 p.m., ACCNX		Wake Forest	W 69–46	15–7 (7–4)	Cameron Indoor Stadium (1,640); Durham, NC
February 11, 2024; 2:00 p.m., ACCN		North Carolina; Rivalry	W 68–60 ^{OT}	16–7 (8–4)	Cameron Indoor Stadium (9,314); Durham, NC
February 15, 2024; 8:00 p.m., ACCN		at No. 12 Virginia Tech	L 56–61	16–8 (8–5)	Cassell Coliseum (8,925); Blacksburg, VA
February 19, 2024; 7:00 p.m., ESPN2		No. 19 Notre Dame	L 62–70	16–9 (8–6)	Cameron Indoor Stadium (2,485); Durham, NC
February 22, 2024; 7:00 p.m., ACCNX		at No. 17 Syracuse	W 58–45	17–9 (9–6)	JMA Wireless Dome (3,480); Syracuse, NY
February 25, 2024; 5:30 p.m., ACCN		No. 6 NC State; Rivalry	W 69–58	18–9 (10–6)	Cameron Indoor Stadium (4,633); Durham, NC
February 29, 2024; 7:00 p.m., ACCNX		Virginia	W 73–54	19–9 (11–6)	Cameron Indoor Stadium (2,005); Durham, NC
March 3, 2024; 4:00 p.m., ESPN		at North Carolina; Rivalry	L 59–63	19–10 (11–7)	Carmichael Arena (6,319); Chapel Hill, NC
ACC Women's Tournament
March 7, 2024; 5:00 p.m., ACCN	(7)	vs. (10) Georgia Tech; Second Round	W 70–58	20–10	Greensboro Coliseum (7,424); Greensboro, NC
March 8, 2024; 5:00 p.m., ACCN	(7)	vs. (2) No. 10 NC State; Quarterfinals	L 51–54	20–11	Greensboro Coliseum (7,720); Greensboro, NC
NCAA Women's Tournament
March 22, 2024*; 2:30 p.m., ESPNNews	(7 P3)	vs. (10 P3) Richmond; First Round	W 72–61	21–11	Value City Arena (5,684); Columbus, OH
March 24, 2024*; 12:00 p.m., ESPN	(7 P3)	at (2 P3) No. 7 Ohio State; Second Round	W 75–63	22–11	Value City Arena (8,333); Columbus, OH
March 30, 2024*; 8:00 p.m., ESPN	(7 P3)	vs. (3 P3) No. 10 UConn; Sweet Sixteen	L 45–53	22–12	Moda Center (12,103); Portland, OR
*Non-conference game. ^{#}Rankings from AP Poll. (#) Tournament seedings in parentheses. P3=Portland 3. All times are in Eastern Time.

== Rankings ==
+ Regular season polls	Poll	Pre- season	Week 2	Week 3	Week 4	Week 5	Week 6	Week 7	Week 8	Week 9	Week 10	Week 11	Week 12	Week 13	Week 14	Week 15	Week 16	Week 17	Week 18	Week 19	Week 20	Final
AP	RV	RV	RV	NR	NR	NR	NR	NR	NR	NR	NR	NR	NR	RV	RV	NR	RV	RV	RV	RV	17	
Coaches	19	22	RV	RV	RV	RV	RV	RV	NR	NR	NR	NR	NR	NR	RV	RV	RV	NR	NR	NR	21	

Legend
	Increase in ranking
	Decrease in ranking
	Not ranked in previous week
(RV)	Received votes
(NR)	Not ranked
