= Battle of the Bay (rivalry) =

American college football rivalry

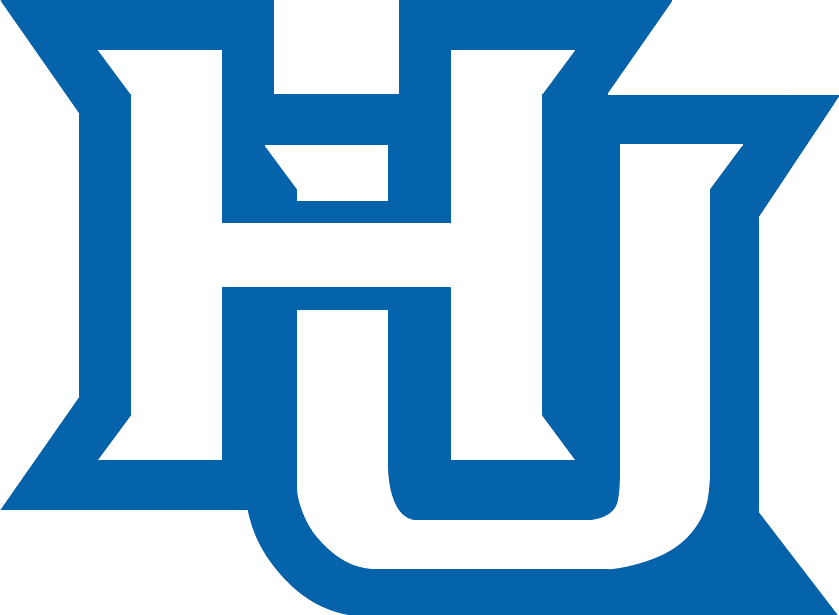
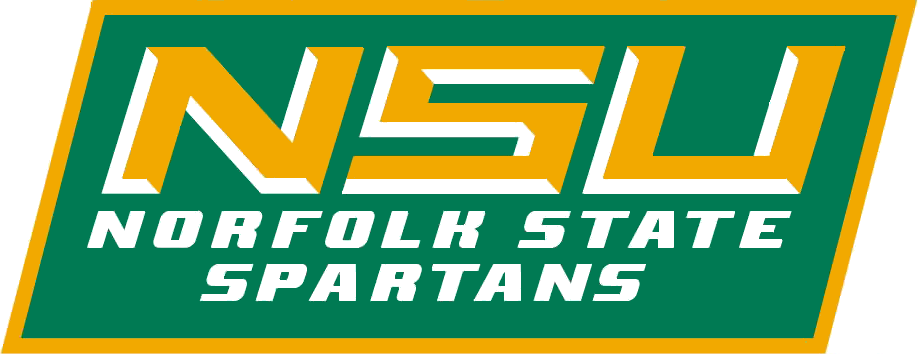
- Hampton Pirates Norfolk State Spartans
- Sport: Football
- First meeting: October 19, 1963; Norfolk State, 42–0
- Latest meeting: September 19, 2026; Norfolk State, 42–21

Statistics
- Total meetings: 61
- All-time series: Norfolk State leads, 31–29–1
- Largest victory: Hampton, 60–0 (1992); Norfolk State, 52–0 (1970)
- Longest win streak: Hampton, 5 (2002–2006); Norfolk State, 6 (1969–1974)
- Current win streak: Norfolk State, 1 (2026–present)

Locations in the Hampton Roads region of Virginia.

The Battle of the Bay is a U.S. college football rivalry between the Hampton Pirates and the Norfolk State Spartans. It is a match-up between two historically black NCAA Division I FCS programs in the Hampton Roads area of Virginia.

== History ==
Private Hampton University and public Norfolk State University are both located in the Hampton Roads region of coastal Virginia. The two schools are located, respectively, in Hampton, Virginia and Norfolk, Virginia, across the James River from each other. As the name of the rivalry suggests, the James River empties into the Chesapeake Bay just downstream.

Hampton and Norfolk State were both members of the Mid-Eastern Athletic Conference in the FCS. On November 16, 2017, Hampton announced that they were becoming a member of the Big South Conference in 2018. The two teams are scheduled to meet again through 2024.

The football series began in 1963 and has been played a total of 61 times as of 2026.

== Game results ==
Hampton victories	Norfolk State victories	Tie games

No.	Date	Location	Winner	Score
1	October 19, 1963	Hampton, VA	Norfolk State	42–0
2	October 17, 1964	Hampton, VA	Norfolk State	13–9
3	October 16, 1965	Portsmouth, VA	Norfolk State	20–0
4	October 15, 1966	Hampton, VA	Norfolk State	33–27
5	October 14, 1967	Portsmouth, VA	Norfolk State	23–20
6	October 19, 1968	Hampton, VA	Hampton	13–7
7	October 18, 1969	Portsmouth, VA	Norfolk State	39–6
8	October 17, 1970	Hampton, VA	Norfolk State	52–0
9	October 16, 1971	Norfolk, VA	Norfolk State	30–15
10	October 14, 1972	Hampton, VA	Norfolk State	33–14
11	October 13, 1973	Norfolk, VA	Norfolk State	21–6
12	October 19, 1974	Hampton, VA	Norfolk State	27–10
13	October 18, 1975	Norfolk, VA	Hampton	27–7
14	October 16, 1976	Hampton, VA	Norfolk State	24–7
15	October 15, 1977	Norfolk, VA	Hampton	18–0
16	October 14, 1978	Hampton, VA	Norfolk State	16–6
17	October 13, 1979	Norfolk, VA	Norfolk State	26–13
18	October 18, 1980	Hampton, VA	Norfolk State	37–14
19	October 17, 1981	Norfolk, VA	Hampton	23–20
20	October 16, 1982	Hampton, VA	Norfolk State	25–7
21	October 15, 1983	Norfolk, VA	Hampton	14–12
22	October 13, 1984	Hampton, VA	Norfolk State	15–7
23	October 19, 1985	Norfolk, VA	Hampton	36–35
24	October 18, 1986	Hampton, VA	Hampton	19–14
25	October 17, 1987	Norfolk, VA	Hampton	48–17
26	October 15, 1988	Hampton, VA	Norfolk State	34–27
27	October 14, 1989	Norfolk, VA	Tie	20–20
28	October 13, 1990	Hampton, VA	Norfolk State	27–18
29	October 19, 1991	Norfolk, VA	Norfolk State	26–12
30	October 17, 1992	Hampton, VA	Hampton	60–0
31	October 16, 1993	Norfolk, VA	Hampton	48–21

No.	Date	Location	Winner	Score
32	October 15, 1994	Hampton, VA	Hampton	53–28
33	October 14, 1995	Norfolk, VA	Hampton	23–18
34	November 16, 1996	Hampton, VA	Norfolk State	14–7
35	October 18, 1997	Norfolk, VA	Hampton	9–2
36	October 17, 1998	Hampton, VA	Hampton	59–14
37	October 16, 1999	Norfolk, VA	Hampton	28–27
38	October 14, 2000	Hampton, VA	Hampton	47–19
39	October 13, 2001	Norfolk, VA	Norfolk State	28–20
40	October 19, 2002	Hampton, VA	Hampton	31–14
41	October 18, 2003	Norfolk, VA	Hampton	52–0
42	October 16, 2004	Hampton, VA	Hampton	58–10
43	October 15, 2005	Norfolk, VA	Hampton	55–14
44	October 14, 2006	Hampton, VA	Hampton	42–13
45	October 13, 2007	Norfolk, VA	Norfolk State	20–19
46	October 18, 2008	Hampton, VA	Hampton	35–17
47	October 17, 2009	Norfolk, VA	Norfolk State	46–6
48	October 16, 2010	Hampton, VA	Hampton	7–6
49	October 15, 2011	Norfolk, VA	Norfolk State	34–24
50	October 13, 2012	Hampton, VA	Hampton	28–14
51	October 19, 2013	Norfolk, VA	Hampton	27–17
52	October 18, 2014	Hampton, VA	Norfolk State	21–13
53	September 26, 2015	Norfolk, VA	Norfolk State	24–14
54	November 19, 2016	Hampton, VA	Norfolk State	17–10
55	October 14, 2017	Norfolk, VA	Hampton	16–14
56	October 2, 2021	Hampton, VA	Norfolk State	47–44^{OT}
57	September 17, 2022	Norfolk, VA	Hampton	17–7
58	September 9, 2023	Hampton, VA	Norfolk State	31–23
59	September 14, 2024	Norfolk, VA	Hampton	37–7
60	October 4, 2025	Hampton, VA	Hampton	41–34
61	September 19, 2026	Norfolk, VA	Norfolk State	42–21
Series: Norfolk State leads 31–29–1

== See also ==
- List of NCAA college football rivalry games
- Norfolk State–Old Dominion rivalry
