= Gill Gymnasium =

Gymnasium in Norfolk, Virginia

The James D. Gill Health & Physical Education Building, commonly known as Gill Gymnasium, is a gymnasium and field house in Norfolk, Virginia on the campus of Norfolk State University. With 3,200 seats, it was built in 1960 to serve as a field house for neighboring Dick Price Stadium as well as being home to the Norfolk State Spartans men's basketball team. The men's and women's teams both called the gym home until the opening of Joseph G. Echols Memorial Hall at the far end of Dick Price Stadium in 1982. The building still serves as a field house and core building of the athletics training facilities on campus, and the women's volleyball team still uses the arena as its primary competition venue.
