= 2022–23 Norfolk State Spartans women's basketball team =

American college basketball season

2022–23 Norfolk State Spartans women's basketball
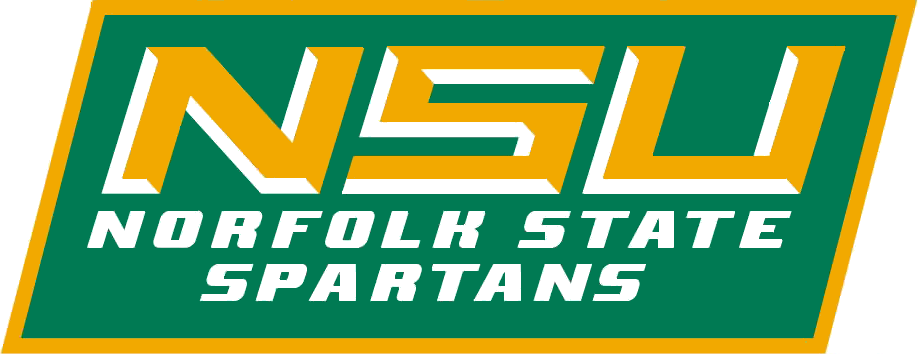

Hostilo Hoops Community Classic champions MEAC regular season and tournament champions

NCAA tournament, First Round
- Conference: Mid-Eastern Athletic Conference
- Record: 26–7 (11–3 MEAC)
- Head coach: Larry Vickers (7th season)
- Associate head coach: Jasmine Young
- Assistant coaches: Kevin Lynum; Annitra Cole
- Home arena: Joseph G. Echols Memorial Hall

2022–23 MEAC women's basketball standings
	Conf.				Overall
Team	W		L	PCT	W		L	PCT
Norfolk State †	11	–	3	.786	26	–	7	.788
Morgan State	10	–	4	.714	17	–	12	.586
Howard	10	–	4	.714	16	–	14	.533
North Carolina Central	8	–	6	.571	15	–	16	.484
Maryland Eastern Shore	5	–	9	.357	10	–	20	.333
Delaware State	5	–	9	.357	7	–	19	.269
Coppin State	5	–	9	.357	8	–	22	.267
South Carolina State	2	–	12	.143	3	–	27	.100
† 2023 MEAC tournament winner As of March 17, 2023

The 2022–23 Norfolk State Spartans women's basketball team represented Norfolk State University in the 2022–23 NCAA Division I women's basketball season. The Spartans, led by seventh-year head coach Larry Vickers, played their home games at the Joseph G. Echols Memorial Hall in Norfolk, Virginia as members of the Mid-Eastern Athletic Conference.

== Roster ==
2022–23 Norfolk State Spartans women's basketball team
Players
Coaches

Pos.	#	Name	Height	Year	Hometown
G	0	Crystal White	5 ft 10 in (1.78 m)	So	Western Branch HS; North Carolina A&T	Chesapeake, VA
G	1	Deja Francis	5 ft 7 in (1.7 m)	GS	Murry Bergtraum; St. Bonaventure	Queens, NY
G	2	Niya Fields	5 ft 8 in (1.73 m)	So	Putnam Science Academy (CT)	Peekskill, NY
G	3	Alana Swift	5 ft 6 in (1.68 m)	RS Jr	Imhotep Charter HS; Panola College	Philadelphia, PA
G	5	Camille Downs	5 ft 10 in (1.78 m)	GS	Colonial Forge HS; UNC Wilmington	Fredericksburg, VA
F	10	Mahoganie Williams	6 ft 1 in (1.85 m)	Jr	Ouachita Parish HS; Trinity Valley CC	Monroe, LA
F	12	Makoye Diawara	6 ft 0 in (1.83 m)	So	Bayonne HS	Bayonne, NJ
F	13	Skye Robinson	6 ft 2 in (1.88 m)	RS Fr	TPLS Christian Academy; VCU	Ruther Glen, VA
G	15	Tamiya Santos	5 ft 5 in (1.65 m)	RS Fr	Menchville HS	Williamsburg, VA
F	22	Kierra Walker	6 ft 1 in (1.85 m)	So	Robbinsdale Cooper HS; Daytona State College	Minneapolis, MN
G	24	Da'naijah Williams	5 ft 9 in (1.75 m)	So	South Shore HS; St. John's	Brooklyn, NY
G/F	35	Danielle Robinson	5 ft 11 in (1.8 m)	GS	University HS; Seton Hall	Williamsburg, VA

Head coach

- Larry Vickers (Norfolk State)

Assistant coach(es)

- Jasmine Young (East Carolina)
- Kevin Lynum (American Military)
- Annitra Cole (North Carolina Central)

Legend

- (C) Team captain
- (S) Suspended
- (I) Ineligible
- (W) Walk-on
- Injured
- Current redshirt

Roster

== Schedule ==
Date time, TV	Rank^{#}	Opponent^{#}	Result	Record	Site (attendance) city, state
Non-conference regular season
November 7, 2022*; 5:30 p.m.		Virginia–Lynchburg	W 125–19	1–0	Joseph G. Echols Memorial Hall (881); Norfolk, VA
November 9, 2022*; 7:00 p.m., BTN+		at Penn State	L 61–67	1–1	Bryce Jordan Center (1,777); University Park, PA
November 13, 2022*; 6:00 p.m., FloSports		at College of Charleston	W 77–47	2–1	TD Arena (191); Charleston, SC
November 17, 2022*; 6:30 p.m., ESPN+		at Appalachian State	W 70–65	3–1	Holmes Convocation Center (245); Boone, NC
November 21, 2022*; 4:30 p.m.		vs. Purdue Fort Wayne; Hostilo Hoops Community Classic	W 62–48	4–1	Enmarket Arena (159); Savannah, GA
November 22, 2022*; 7:00 p.m.		vs. UT Martin; Hostilo Hoops Community Classic	W 70–55	5–1	Enmarket Arena (83); Savannah, GA
November 23, 2022*; 7:00 p.m.		vs. Marshall; Hostilo Hoops Community Classic	W 48–43	6–1	Enmarket Arena (143); Savannah, GA
November 28, 2022*; 5:30 p.m.		Campbell	W 54–42	7–1	Joseph G. Echols Memorial Hall (598); Norfolk, VA
December 1, 2022*; 6:00 p.m.		Hampton	W 65–56	8–1	Joseph G. Echols Memorial Hall (1,237); Norfolk, VA
December 3, 2022*; 1:00 p.m.		NJIT	W 71–64	9–1	Joseph G. Echols Memorial Hall (504); Norfolk, VA
December 11, 2022*; 2:00 p.m., ESPN+		at Old Dominion; Rivalry	L 44–65	9–2	Chartway Arena (2,124); Norfolk, VA
December 14, 2022*; 5:30 p.m.		Regent	Postponed		Joseph G. Echols Memorial Hall; Norfolk, VA
December 18, 2022*; 3:00 p.m., SECN+		at Alabama	L 30–92	9–3	Coleman Coliseum (1,843); Tuscaloosa, AL
December 21, 2022*; 2:00 p.m.		William & Mary	W 70–52	10–3	Joseph G. Echols Memorial Hall (162); Norfolk, VA
December 23, 2022*; 3:00 p.m., FloSports		at UNC Wilmington	W 42–38	11–3	Trask Coliseum (592); Wilmington, NC
January 3, 2023*; 3:00 p.m.		Chicago State	W 86–53	12–3	Joseph G. Echols Memorial Hall (282); Norfolk, VA
MEAC regular season
January 7, 2023; 2:00 p.m.		Maryland Eastern Shore	W 43–34	13–3 (1–0)	Joseph G. Echols Memorial Hall (988); Norfolk, VA
January 9, 2023; 5:30 p.m.		at Delaware State	W 40–26	14–3 (2–0)	Memorial Hall (172); Dover, DE
January 14, 2023; 2:00 p.m.		Howard	W 64–37	15–3 (3–0)	Joseph G. Echols Memorial Hall (1,214); Norfolk, VA
January 21, 2023; 2:00 p.m.		at Coppin State	W 49–43	16–3 (4–0)	Physical Education Complex (330); Baltimore, MD
January 23, 2023; 4:00 p.m.		at Morgan State	L 46–57	16–4 (4–1)	Talmadge L. Hill Field House (508); Baltimore, MD
January 28, 2023; 2:00 p.m.		South Carolina State	W 64–43	17–4 (5–1)	Joseph G. Echols Memorial Hall (1,250); Norfolk, VA
February 6, 2023; 4:00 p.m.		North Carolina Central; Rescheduled from January 30	L 68–73 ^{OT}	17–5 (5–2)	Joseph G. Echols Memorial Hall (476); Norfolk, VA
February 11, 2023; 2:00 p.m.		at Maryland Eastern Shore	W 53–51	18–5 (6–2)	Hytche Athletic Center (880); Princess Anne, MD
February 13, 2023; 5:30 p.m.		Delaware State	W 70–42	19–5 (7–2)	Joseph G. Echols Memorial Hall (1,147); Norfolk, VA
February 18, 2023; 2:00 p.m.		Morgan State	W 74–37	20–5 (8–2)	Joseph G. Echols Memorial Hall (2,353); Norfolk, VA
February 20, 2023; 5:30 p.m.		Coppin State	W 47–36	21–5 (9–2)	Joseph G. Echols Memorial Hall (1,387); Norfolk, VA
February 25, 2023; 2:00 p.m.		at South Carolina State	W 69–41	22–5 (10–2)	SHM Memorial Center (217); Orangeburg, SC
February 27, 2023; 5:30 p.m.		at North Carolina Central	W 79–67	23–5 (11–2)	McDougald–McLendon Arena (2,078); Durham, NC
March 2, 2023; 5:30 p.m.		at Howard	L 55–60	23–6 (11–3)	Burr Gymnasium (841); Washington, D.C.
MEAC Women's Tournament
March 8, 2023; 12:00 p.m., ESPN+	(1)	vs. (8) South Carolina State; Quarterfinals	W 61–37	24–6	Norfolk Scope; Norfolk, VA
March 10, 2023; 12:00 p.m., ESPN+	(1)	vs. (4) North Carolina Central; Semifinals	W 81–59	25–6	Norfolk Scope; Norfolk, VA
March 11, 2023; 4:00 p.m., ESPN+	(1)	vs. (3) Howard; Championship Game	W 56–52	26–6	Norfolk Scope; Norfolk, VA
NCAA Women's Tournament
March 17, 2023*; 2:00 p.m., ESPN	(1 G1)	at (16 G1) No. 1 South Carolina; First Round	L 40–72	26–7	Colonial Life Arena; Columbia, SC
*Non-conference game. ^{#}Rankings from AP Poll. (#) Tournament seedings in parentheses. G1=Greenville 1. All times are in Eastern Time.

== See also ==
- 2022–23 Norfolk State Spartans men's basketball team
