= Maryland Eastern Shore Hawks women's basketball =

2025–26 Maryland Eastern Shore Hawks women's basketball team
- University: University of Maryland Eastern Shore
- Head coach: Malikah Willis (2nd season)
- Location: Princess Anne, Maryland
- Arena: Hytche Athletic Center (capacity: 5,500)
- Conference: MEAC
- Nickname: Hawks
- Colors: Maroon and gray

The Maryland Eastern Shore Hawks women's basketball team represents University of Maryland Eastern Shore in Princess Anne, Maryland, United States. The school's team currently competes in the Mid-Eastern Athletic Conference.

== History ==
Maryland Eastern Shore began play in 1981, with their transition to Division I happening during the 1981–82 season. They have never won the MEAC title, though they reached the Final in 2015, losing to Savannah State 65–47.
