= 2023 MEAC women's basketball tournament =

US collegiate basketball tournament

- Classification: Division I
- Season: 2022–23
- Teams: 8
- Site: Norfolk Scope; Norfolk, Virginia
- Champions: Norfolk State (2nd title)
- Winning coach: Larry Vickers (1st title)
- Television: ESPN+, ESPN Networks

2022–23 MEAC women's basketball standings
	Conf.				Overall
Team	W		L	PCT	W		L	PCT
Norfolk State †	11	–	3	.786	26	–	7	.788
Morgan State	10	–	4	.714	17	–	12	.586
Howard	10	–	4	.714	16	–	14	.533
North Carolina Central	8	–	6	.571	15	–	16	.484
Maryland Eastern Shore	5	–	9	.357	10	–	20	.333
Delaware State	5	–	9	.357	7	–	19	.269
Coppin State	5	–	9	.357	8	–	22	.267
South Carolina State	2	–	12	.143	3	–	27	.100
† 2023 MEAC tournament winner As of March 17, 2023

The 2023 MEAC women's basketball tournament was the postseason men's basketball tournament for the 2022–23 season in the Mid-Eastern Athletic Conference (MEAC). The tournament took place during March 8–11, 2023. The tournament winner received the conference's automatic invitation to the 2023 NCAA Division I women's basketball tournament.

== Seeds ==
All 8 teams were eligible and were seeded by record within the conference, with a tiebreaker system to seed teams with identical conference records.

Seed	School	Conference	Tiebreaker
1	Norfolk State	11-3	
2	Morgan State	10-4	2-0 vs. North Carolina Central
3	Howard	10-4	1-1 vs. North Carolina Central
4	North Carolina Central	8-6	
5	Coppin State	5-9	3-1 vs. Delaware State/Maryland Eastern Shore
6	Delaware State	5-9	2-2 vs. Coppin State/Maryland Eastern Shore
7	Maryland Eastern Shore	5-9	1-3 vs. Coppin State/Delaware State
8	South Carolina State	2-12	

== Schedule ==
Game	Time*	Matchup^{#}	Score	Television
Quarterfinals – Wednesday, March 8, 2023
1	12:00 p.m.	No. 1 Norfolk State vs. No. 8 South Carolina State	61-37	ESPN+
2	2:00 p.m.	No. 2 Morgan State vs. No. 7 Maryland Eastern Shore	46-49	ESPN+
Quarterfinals – Thursday, March 9, 2023
3	12:00 p.m.	No. 4 North Carolina Central vs. No. 5 Coppin State	57-50	ESPN+
4	2:00 p.m.	No. 3 Howard vs. No. 6 Delaware State	67-35	ESPN+
Semifinals – Friday, March 10, 2023
5	12:00 p.m.	No. 1 Norfolk State vs. No. 4 North Carolina Central	81-59	ESPN+
6	2:00 p.m.	No. 7 Maryland Eastern Shore vs. No. 3 Howard	60-62	ESPN+
Championship – Saturday, March 11, 2023
7	4:00 p.m.	No. 1 Norfolk State vs. No. 3 Howard		ESPN Networks
*Game times in EST. #-Rankings denote tournament seeding.

== Bracket ==
Quarterfinals; March 8–9; ESPN+
1	Norfolk State	61
8	South Carolina State	37
4	North Carolina Central	57
5	Coppin State	50
2	Morgan State	46
7	Maryland Eastern Shore	49
3	Howard	67
6	Delaware State	35

Semifinals; March 10; ESPN+
1	Norfolk State	81
4	North Carolina Central	59
7	Maryland Eastern Shore	60
3	Howard	62

Championship; March 11; ESPN Networks
1	Norfolk State	56
3	Howard	52
