= Echols Hall =

Indoor arena in Norfolk, Virginia

Joseph G. Echols Memorial Hall
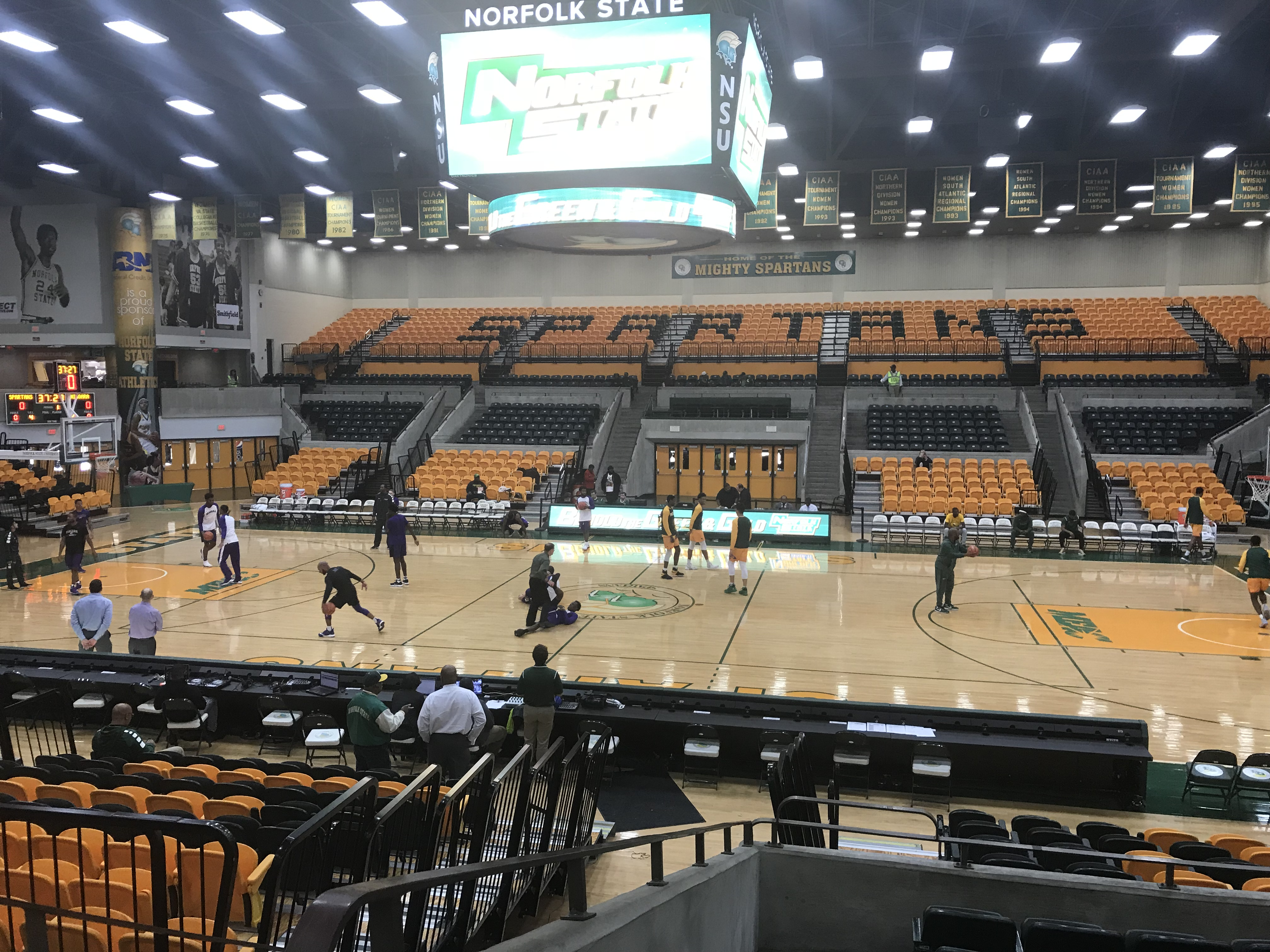
- Interactive map of Joseph G. Echols Memorial Hall
- Location: 700 Park Avenue; Norfolk, Virginia 23504
- Coordinates: 36.847999°N 76.258157°W
- Owner: Norfolk State University
- Operator: Norfolk State University
- Capacity: 4,500
- Surface: Floating floor

Construction
- Opened: November 1982

Tenants
- Norfolk State Spartans (NCAA) (1982–present)

Joseph G. Echols Memorial Hall is a 4,500-seat multi-purpose arena in Norfolk, Virginia, located to the northeast of Dick Price Stadium on the eastern edge of Norfolk State University. It is home to the Norfolk State Spartans men's and women's basketball teams.

== History ==
Echols Hall was built in 1982 to replace Gill Gymnasium as home to Norfolk State's men's and women's basketball and women's volleyball teams, as well as housing athletics offices and hosting the school's ROTC program. The seating bowl is divided into four sides, with three divided levels of seating colored green and gold, the school's colors. The hall is named for Joseph G. Echols, who is credited by the university as the person most responsible for the expansion of the school's athletics department to its current extents. It hosted the 1997 MEAC men's basketball tournament.

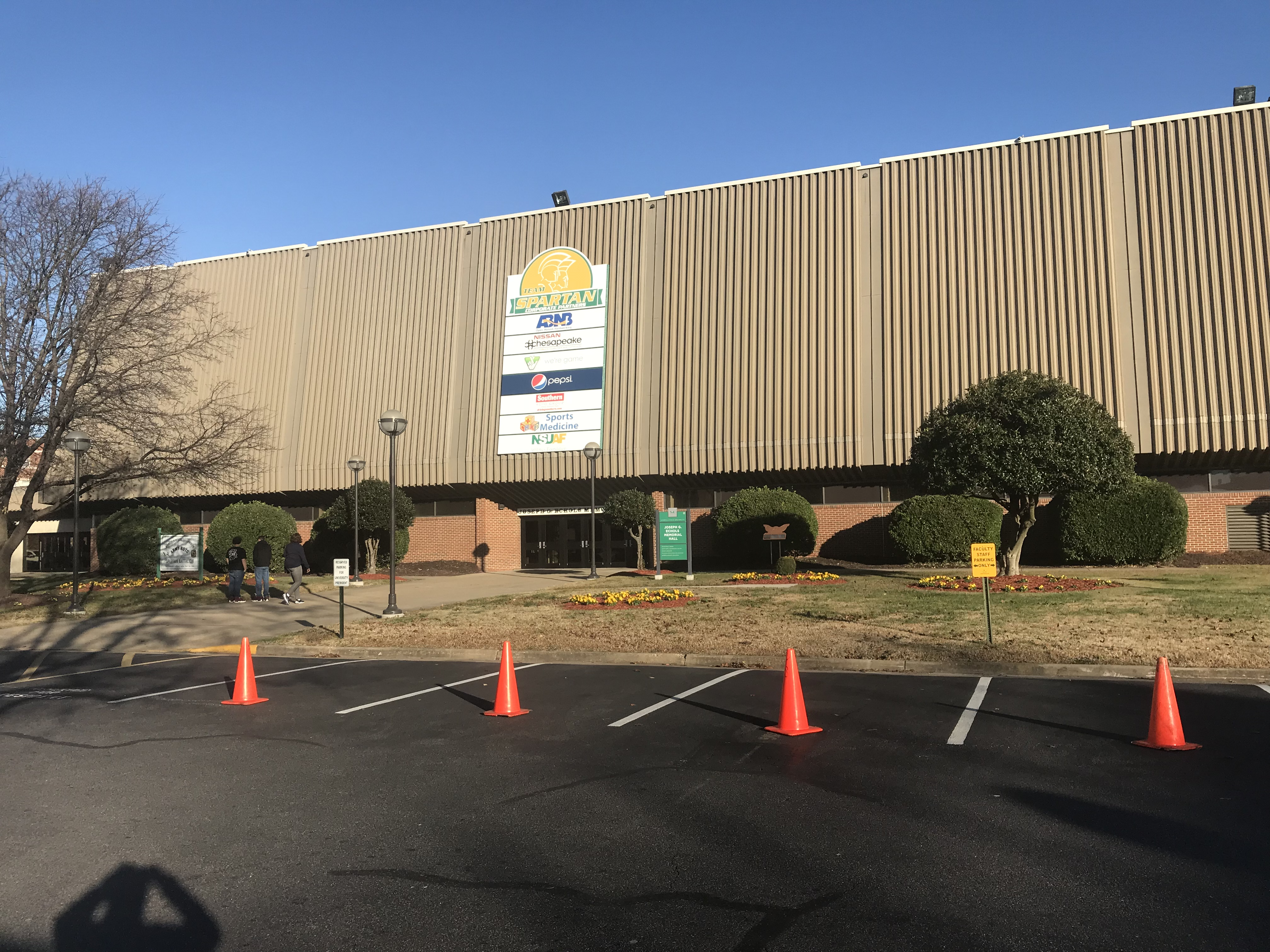
The entrance to the arena.

== See also ==
- List of NCAA Division I basketball arenas
