= Hytche Athletic Center =

Arena in Princess Anne, Maryland

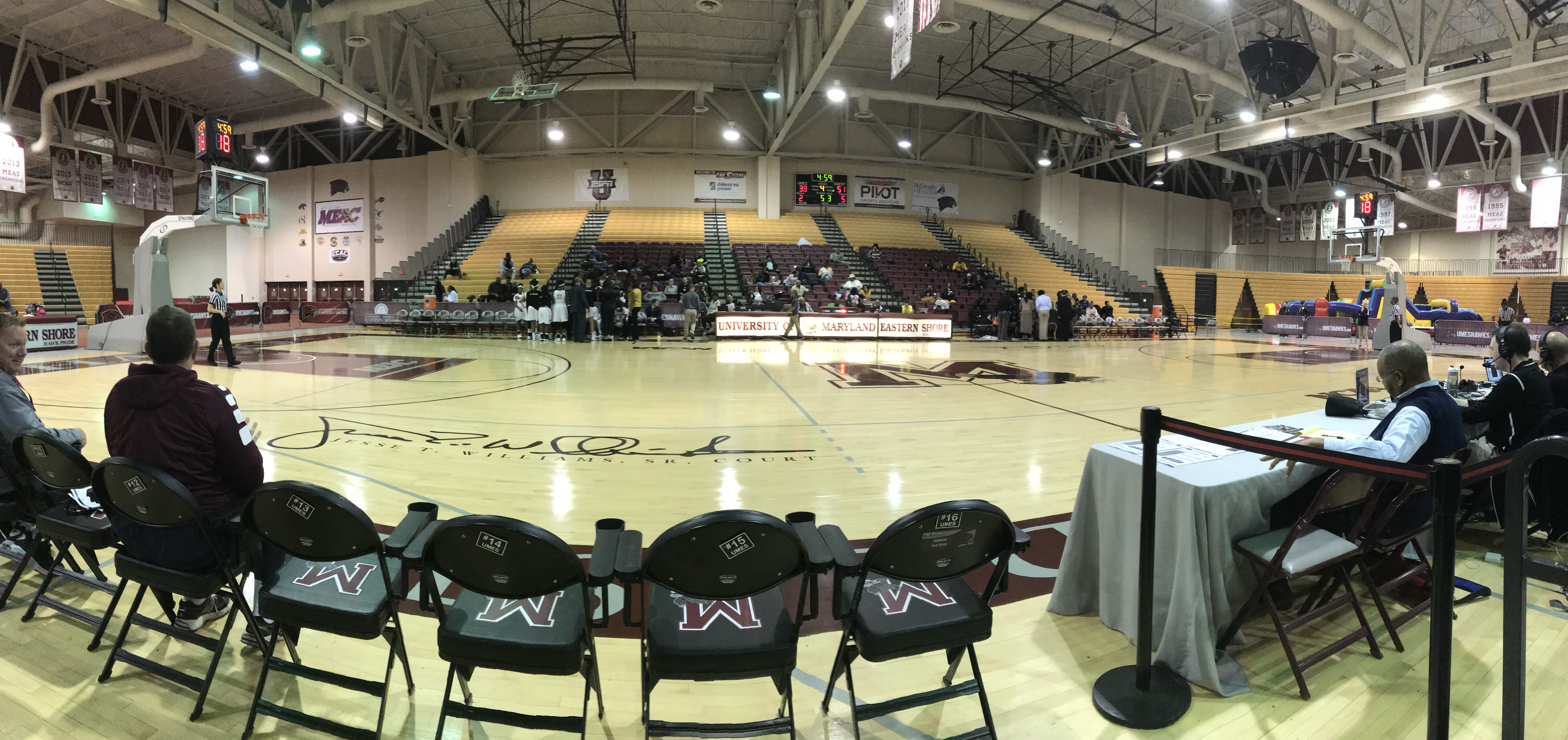
- The Hytche Center in 2018
- Interactive map of Hytche Athletic Center
- Location: Princess Anne, Maryland
- Coordinates: 38.211184°N 75.687227°W
- Owner: University of Maryland Eastern Shore
- Capacity: 5,500
- Public transit: Shore Transit bus: 252, 255, 705N

Construction
- Opened: 2000

Tenants
- Maryland Eastern Shore Hawks (NCAA); Men's basketball (2000–present); Women's basketball (2000–present)

Hytche Athletic Center is a 5,500-seat multi-purpose arena in Princess Anne, Maryland. It is home to the University of Maryland Eastern Shore Hawks men's and women's basketball teams and women's volleyball team. It replaced J. Millard Tawes Gymnasium as the home of UMES basketball upon its opening in 2000.

== See also ==
- List of NCAA Division I basketball arenas
