= Florida State Seminoles women's basketball =

2026-27 Florida State Seminoles women's basketball team
- University: Florida State University
- First season: 1970–71; 56 years ago
- Head coach: Brooke Wyckoff (6th season)
- Location: Tallahassee, Florida
- Arena: Donald L. Tucker Center (capacity: 12,100)
- Conference: Atlantic Coast Conference
- Nickname: Seminoles
- Colors: Garnet and gold
- Student section: The Nole Zone
- All-time record: 918–684 (.573)

NCAA Division I tournament Elite Eight
- 2010, 2015, 2017
Other NCAA Division I tournament results
Sweet Sixteen	2007*, 2010, 2015, 2016, 2017
Appearances	1983, 1990, 1991, 2001, 2005, 2006, 2007*, 2008, 2009, 2010, 2011, 2013, 2014, 2015, 2016, 2017, 2018, 2019, 2021, 2022, 2023, 2024, 2025

Conference tournament champions
- Metro: 1991

Conference regular-season champions
- Metro: 1991 ACC: 2009, 2010

Uniforms
Home	Away	Alternate

The Florida State Seminoles women's basketball team represents Florida State University (variously Florida State or FSU) in the intercollegiate sport of basketball. The Seminoles compete in the National Collegiate Athletic Association (NCAA) Division I and the Atlantic Coast Conference (ACC).

Florida State has made 23 NCAA tournament appearances, advancing to the Round of 32 on seventeen occasions, the Sweet Sixteen five times, and the Elite Eight three times. Florida State has also made one appearance in the National Women's Invitation Tournament and two appearances in the Women's National Invitation Tournament. The Seminoles have won the regular season conference title three times, including two ACC titles, and the conference tournament title once.

Florida State has produced twenty-one All-Americans and five players inducted into their respective Halls of Fame, with several players going on to play in the Women's National Basketball Association (WNBA).

The Seminoles are coached by alumnus Brooke Wyckoff and play their home games in the Donald L. Tucker Center on the university's Tallahassee, Florida, campus.

== Overview ==
The Florida State Seminoles women's team annually plays an eighteen-game conference schedule, preceded by a non-conference schedule with few annual opponents apart from Florida. Their conference schedule includes home-and-home games against two permanent rivals (Miami and Clemson) and alternating home-and-home games against the remaining ACC teams.

== History ==
Florida State University has officially fielded a basketball team since 1970.

=== Early history (1970–1997) ===
Barbara Hollingsworth served as the first basketball coach for one year (197- 71).

Linda Warren became the second basketball coach for the Lady Seminoles for one year (1971 - 72).

Eddie Cubbon became the third head coach for one season, compiling a record of 11–5.

The fourth coach, Joel Thirer, compiled a 9–6 record in one season.

Millie Usher became the first coach at Florida State to stay at the school for multiple seasons, compiling a record of 27–28.

Dianne Murphy, the programmes sixth coach compiled a 37–35 record in three seasons with the Noles.

Jan Dykehouse-Allen stayed at the school for seven years and was the first coach to compile over 100 victories, with a record of 111–108. She was also the first coach to lead the team to the NCAA tournament.

Marynell Meadors led the Seminoles for ten years, accumulating a record of 132–152 and securing two tournament appearances.

Chris Gobrecht left to coach her alma mater after a five-win season at Florida State, her only year at the school.

=== Modern history (1997–present) ===
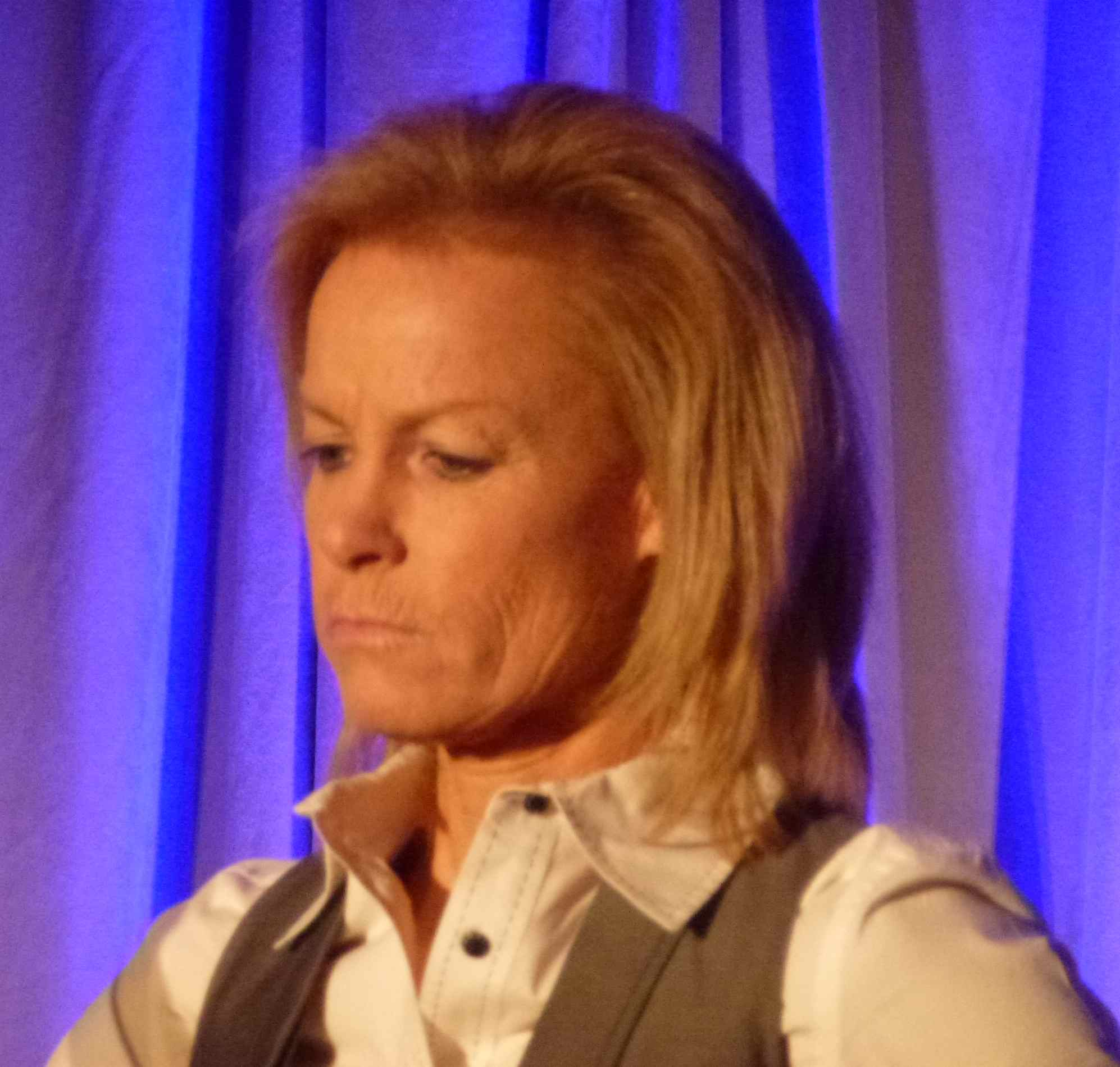
Sue Semrau is the winningest coach in program history.

Sue Semrau coached at Florida State for over 20 years. She led the Seminoles to 16 tournaments and was named the ACC Coach of the Year four times and the Associated Press Coach of the Year once.

Semrau took a leave of absence for the 2020–21 season and Brooke Wyckoff, who had been serving as the associate head coach, served as the interim coach for the duration of that season. On March 21, 2022, Semrau announced her retirement.

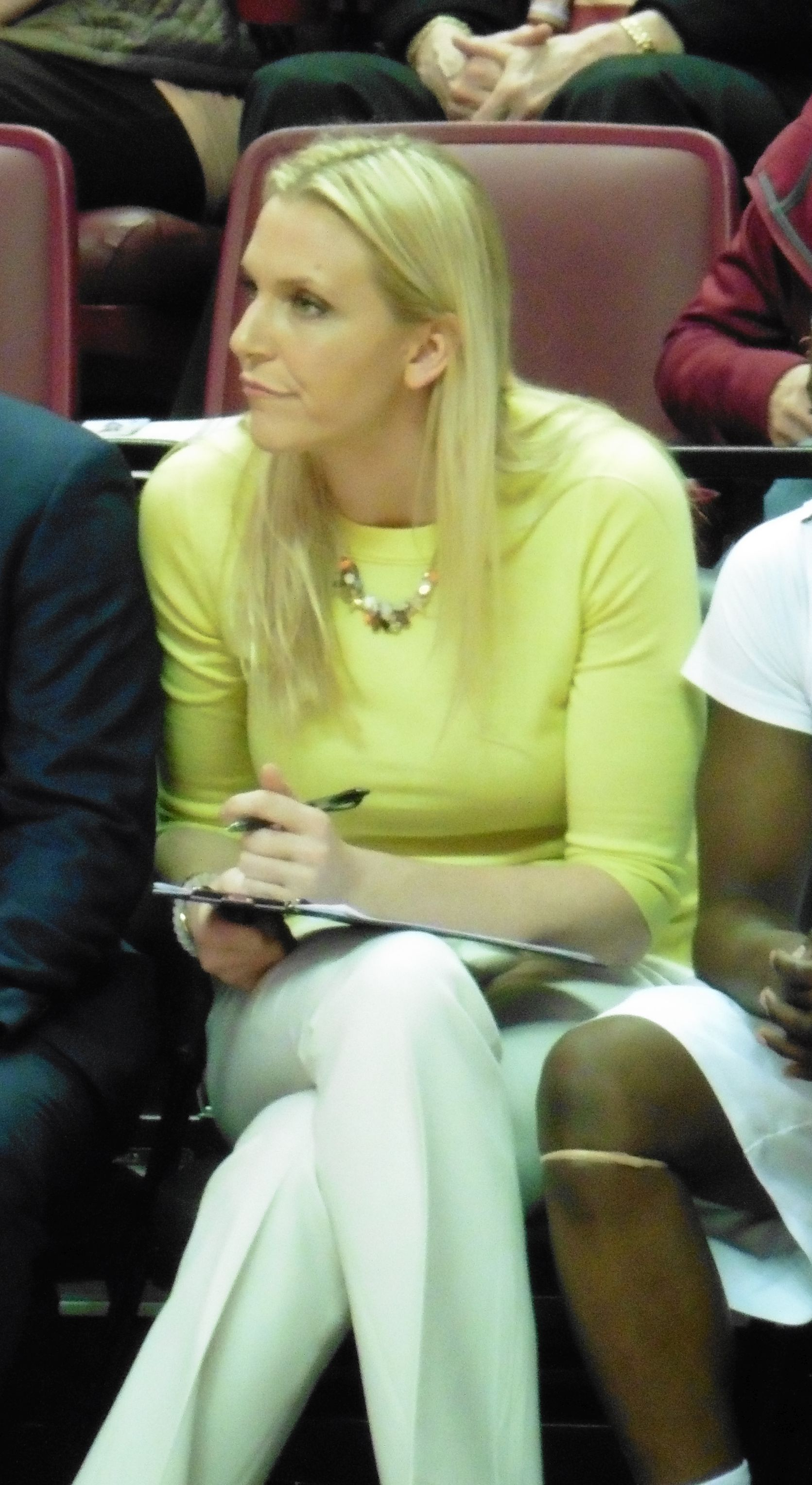
Wyckoff played at FSU from 1997-2001 and was an assistant coach under Semrau from 2011-2022.

On March 29, 2022, former player and assistant Brooke Wyckoff was announced as the head coach of the program. Since taking over the program, Wyckoff has led the team to a tournament berth in four of her five seasons.

== Head coaches ==
Tenure	Coach	Years	Record	Pct.
1970–71	Barbara Hollingsworth	1	unknown	unknown
1971–72	Linda Warren	1	unknown	unknown
1972–73	Eddie Cubbon	1	11–5	.688
1973–74	Joel Thirer	1	9–6	.600
1974–76	Millie Usher	2	27–28	.491
1976–79	Dianne Murphy	3	37–35	.514
1979–86	Jan Dykehouse-Allen	7	111–108	.507
1986–96	Marynell Meadors	10	132–152	.465
1996–97	Chris Gobrecht	1	5–22	.185
1997–2020, 2021–2022	Sue Semrau	24	493–272	.644
2020–2021 (interim), 2022–present	Brooke Wyckoff	6	97–60	.618
Totals	10 coaches	58 seasons	918–684	.573

== Championships ==
=== NWIT championship appearance ===
Florida State has appeared in the National Women's Invitation Tournament's National Championship game once, in 1982. The Seminoles, coached by Jan Dykehouse-Allen, lost to Oregon State, 76–60, at the Amarillo Civic Center in Amarillo, Texas.

Season	Coach	Site	Opponent	Result	Overall record
1981–1982	Jan Dykehouse-Allen	Amarillo Civic Center	Oregon State	FSU 60, Oregon State 76	28–10
Total National Women's Invitation Tournament Championship Game Appearances					1

=== Conference tournament championships ===
Conference Affiliations

- 1970–1980: Independent
- 1980–1991: Metro Conference
- 1991–present: Atlantic Coast Conference

Season	Conference	Coach	Opponent	PF	PA
1990–1991	Metro	Marynell Meadors	South Carolina	54	53
Total Conference tournament Titles			1		

=== Conference regular season championships ===
Season	Conference	Coach	Overall	Conference
1990–1991	Metro	Marynell Meadors	25–7	12–2
2008–2009	ACC	Sue Semrau	26–8	12–2
2009–2010	ACC	Sue Semrau	29–6	12–2
Total conference titles			3	

== Year by year results ==
National Champions	Conference Tournament Champions	Conference Regular Season Champions	NCAA tournament	NIT Tournament

Note: W = Wins, L = Losses, C = Conference

Season	Coach	Conference	W	L	CW	CL	Notes
1970–71	Barbara Hollingsworth	Independent	–	–	–	–	
1971–72	Linda Warren	Independent	–	–	–	–	
1972–73	Eddie Cubbon	Independent	11	5	–	–	
1973–74	Joel Thirer	Independent	9	6	–	–	
1974–75	Millie Usher	Independent	15	16	–	–	
1975–76	Millie Usher	Independent	12	12	–	–	
1976–77	Dianne Murphy	Independent	11	12	–	–	
1977–78	Dianne Murphy	Independent	8	9	–	–	FAIA State Tournament
1978–79	Dianne Murphy	Independent	18	14	–	–	
1979–80	Jan Dykehouse-Allen	Independent	13	22	–	–	AIAW Region Tournament
1980–81	Jan Dykehouse-Allen	Metro	14	15	1	3	FAIA State Tournament
1981–82	Jan Dykehouse-Allen	Metro	28	10	2	3	NWIT Runner-Up
1982–83	Jan Dykehouse-Allen	Metro	24	6	5	1	NCAA first round
1983–84	Jan Dykehouse-Allen	Metro	13	18	2	9	
1984–85	Jan Dykehouse-Allen	Metro	7	21	2	9	
1985–86	Jan Dykehouse-Allen	Metro	12	16	3	8	
1986–87	Marynell Meadors	Metro	9	19	5	7	
1987–88	Marynell Meadors	Metro	9	18	4	8	
1988–89	Marynell Meadors	Metro	16	11	7	5	
1989–90	Marynell Meadors	Metro	21	9	11	3	NCAA first round
1990–91	Marynell Meadors	Metro	25	7	12	2	NCAA second round
1991–92	Marynell Meadors	ACC	17	11	8	8	
1992–93	Marynell Meadors	ACC	13	14	6	10	
1993–94	Marynell Meadors	ACC	6	21	3	13	
1994–95	Marynell Meadors	ACC	8	22	3	13	
1995–96	Marynell Meadors	ACC	8	20	2	14	
1996–97	Chris Gobrecht	ACC	5	22	0	16	
1997–98	Sue Semrau	ACC	9	18	5	11	
1998–99	Sue Semrau	ACC	7	20	2	14	
1999–00	Sue Semrau	ACC	12	17	4	12	
2000–01	Sue Semrau	ACC	19	12	9	7	NCAA second round
2001–02	Sue Semrau	ACC	13	15	4	12	
2002–03	Sue Semrau	ACC	17	13	8	8	WNIT Semifinals
2003–04	Sue Semrau	ACC	15	15	7	9	WNIT Semifinals
2004–05	Sue Semrau	ACC	24	8	9	5	NCAA second round
2005–06	Sue Semrau	ACC	20	10	10	4	NCAA second round
2006–07	Sue Semrau	ACC	0*	10	10	4	NCAA Sweet Sixteen
2007–08	Sue Semrau	ACC	13*	14	7	7	NCAA second round
2008–09	Sue Semrau	ACC	26	8	12	2	NCAA second round
2009–10	Sue Semrau	ACC	29	6	12	2	NCAA Elite Eight
2010–11	Sue Semrau	ACC	24	8	11	3	NCAA second round
2011–12	Sue Semrau	ACC	14	17	6	10	
2012–13	Sue Semrau	ACC	23	10	11	7	NCAA second round
2013–14	Sue Semrau	ACC	21	12	7	9	NCAA second round
2014–15	Sue Semrau	ACC	32	5	14	2	NCAA Elite Eight
2015–16	Sue Semrau	ACC	25	8	13	3	NCAA Sweet Sixteen
2016–17	Sue Semrau	ACC	28	7	13	3	NCAA Elite Eight
2017–18	Sue Semrau	ACC	26	7	12	4	NCAA second round
2018–19	Sue Semrau	ACC	24	9	10	6	NCAA second round
2019–20	Sue Semrau	ACC	24	8	11	7	
2020–21	Brooke Wyckoff	ACC	10	9	9	7	NCAA first round
2021–22	Sue Semrau	ACC	17	14	10	8	NCAA First Four
2022–23	Brooke Wyckoff	ACC	23	10	12	6	NCAA first round
2023–24	Brooke Wyckoff	ACC	23	11	12	6	NCAA first round
2024–25	Brooke Wyckoff	ACC	24	9	13	5	NCAA second round
2025–26	Brooke Wyckoff	ACC	10	21	5	13	
2026–27	Brooke Wyckoff	ACC	7	0	0	0	
Total:			938	684	350	337	
Win Percentage:			.578		.509		

*Wins vacated as part of the academic scandal

=== Record vs. rivals ===
Opponent	Won	Lost	Percentage	Streak	First Meeting
Florida	41	45	.477	Won 1	1974
Miami	54	20	.730	Won 1	1975
Totals	94	65	.591		

=== All-time record vs. ACC teams ===
Opponent	Won	Lost	Percentage	Streak	First Meeting
Boston College	21	3	.875	Won 3	2006
California	0	2	.000	Lost 2	2025
Clemson	39	29	.574	Lost 1	1980
Duke	15	41	.268	Lost 3	1992
Georgia Tech	33	27	.550	Lost 2	1975
Louisville	19	20	.487	Lost 5	1978
Miami	54	20	.730	Won 1	1975
North Carolina	19	36	.345	Lost 2	1982
NC State	17	38	.309	Lost 4	1992
Notre Dame	2	14	.125	Lost 1	2014
Pittsburgh	13	0	1.000	Won 13	2014
SMU	2	0	1.000	Won 2	2024
Stanford	0	4	.000	Lost 4	2014
Syracuse	8	7	.533	Lost 1	2014
Virginia	23	37	.383	Lost 1	1990
Virginia Tech	32	13	.711	Lost 1	1979
Wake Forest	40	20	.667	Won 5	1992
Totals	336	312	.519		

=== ACC-Big Ten Challenge ===
The Seminoles participated in the ACC-Big Ten Women's Challenge 15 times, compiling a record of 13–2.

Year	Opponent	Location	Result
2007	Indiana	Bloomington, Indiana	W 85–78
2008	Penn State	Tallahassee, Florida	W 73–60
2009	Indiana	Bloomington, Indiana	W 82–74
2010	Michigan State	Tallahassee, Florida	L 64–72
2011	Ohio State	Columbus, Ohio	L 75–78 (OT)
2012	Iowa	Tallahassee, Florida	W 83–69
2013	Michigan State	Tallahassee, Florida	W 60–58
2014	Purdue	West Lafayette, Indiana	W 67–64 (OT)
2015	Rutgers	Tallahassee, Florida	W 65–43
2016	Minnesota	Minneapolis, Minnesota	W 75–61
2017	Iowa	Iowa City, Iowa	W 94–93
2018	Penn State	Tallahassee, Florida	W 87–58
2019	Michigan State	Tallahassee, Florida	W 78–68
2021	Illinois	Champaign, Illinois	W 67–58
2022	Wisconsin	Madison, Wisconsin	W 92–87
Record			13–2 (.867)

==== ACC-SEC Challenge ====
The Seminoles have participated in the ACC–SEC Challenge three times, compiling a record of 0–3.

Year	Opponent	Location	Result
2023	Arkansas	Tallahassee, Florida	L 58–71
2024	Tennessee	Knoxville, Tennessee	L 77–79
2025	Georgia	Tallahassee, Florida	L 60–80
2026	Missouri	Tallahassee, Florida	
Record			0–3 (.000)

=== Polls ===
Florida State has ended their basketball season ranked 13 times in at least one of the AP and Coaches Polls. Top-10 finishes are colored ██

Year	Record	AP Poll	Coaches
2000–2001	19–12		25
2006–2007	24–10		19
2008–2009	26–8	12	18
2009–2010	29–6	11	9
2010–2011	24–8	15	20
2012–2013	23–10	25	24
2014–2015	32–5	7	7

Year	Record	AP Poll	Coaches
2015–2016	25–8	17	12
2016–2017	28–7	10	7
2017–2018	26–7	11	13
2018–2019	24–9	25	23
2019–2020	24–8	19	20
2024–2025	24–9	22	24

A fourth-place ranking is the best the team has ever received.

== Postseason results ==
Florida State has appeared in the postseason 26 times.

=== NCAA tournament Results ===
The Seminoles have appeared in 23 NCAA tournaments, including a current streak of 12 consecutive appearances, with a record of 25–23.

Year	Seed	Round	Opponent	Result
1983	#5	First Round	#4 Ole Miss	L 86–76
1990	#10	First Round	#7 Penn State	L 83–73
1991	#5	First Round; Second Round	#12 Appalachian State #4 Western Kentucky	W 96–57; L 72–69
2001	#7	First Round; Second Round	#10 Tulane #2 Iowa State	W 72–70; L 85–70
2005	#6	First Round; Second Round	#11 Richmond #3 Connecticut	W 87–54; L 70–52
2006	#6	First Round; Second Round	#11 Louisiana Tech #3 Stanford	W 80–71; L 88–70
2007	#10	First Round; Second Round; Sweet Sixteen	#7 Old Dominion #2 Stanford #3 LSU	W 85–75; W 68–61; L 55–43
2008	#11	First Round; Second Round	#6 Ohio State #3 Oklahoma State	W 60–49; L 73–72 (OT)
2009	#3	First Round; Second Round	#14 NC A&T #6 Arizona State	W 83–71; L 63–58
2010	#3	First Round; Second Round; Sweet Sixteen; Elite Eight	#14 Louisiana Tech #6 St. John's #7 Mississippi State #1 Connecticut	W 75–61; W 66–65 (OT); W 74–71; L 90–50
2011	#3	First Round; Second Round	#14 Samford #6 Georgia	W 76–46; L 61–59
2013	#8	First Round; Second Round	#9 Princeton #1 Baylor	W 60–44; L 87–45
2014	#10	First Round; Second Round	#7 Iowa State #2 Stanford	W 55–44; L 63–44
2015	#2	First Round; Second Round; Sweet Sixteen; Elite Eight	#15 Alabama State #7 Florida Gulf Coast #3 Arizona State #1 South Carolina	W 91–49; W 65–47; W 66–65; L 80–74
2016	#5	First Round; Second Round; Sweet Sixteen	#12 Middle Tennessee State #4 Texas A&M #1 Baylor	W 72–55; W 74–56; L 78–58
2017	#3	First Round; Second Round; Sweet Sixteen; Elite Eight	#14 Western Illinois #6 Missouri #2 Oregon State #1 South Carolina	W 91–49; W 65–47; W 66–65; L 80–74
2018	#3	First Round; Second Round	#14 Little Rock #11 Buffalo	W 91–49; L 86–65
2019	#5	First Round; Second Round	#12 Bucknell #4 South Carolina	W 70–67; L 72–64
2021	#9	First Round	#8 Oregon State	L 83–59
2022	#11	First Four	#11 Missouri State	L 50–61
2023	#7	First Round	#10 Georgia	L 54–66
2024	#9	First Round	#8 Alabama	L 72–84
2025	#6	First Round; Second Round	#11 George Mason #3 LSU	W 94–59; L 71–101

==== NWIT ====
The Seminoles appeared in the National Women's Invitation Tournament on one occasion.

Year	Result
1982	Runner-Up

==== WNIT ====
The Seminoles have appeared in the Women's National Invitation Tournament twice.

Year	Result
2003	Semifinals
2004	Semifinals

==== ACC tournament ====
Florida State has a record of 16–32 at the ACC women's basketball tournament.

Year	Seed	Result
1992	#5	First Round
1993	#7	First Round
1994	#9	First Round
1995	#9	First Round
1996	#9	Quarterfinals
1997	#9	First Round
1998	#7	First Round
1999	#9	First Round
2000	#8	Quarterfinals
2001	#4	Semifinals
2002	#9	First Round
2003	#4	First Round
2004	#5	First Round
2005	#4	First Round
2006	#4	First Round
2007	#5	Quarterfinals
2008	#6	Quarterfinals
2009	#2	Semifinals
2010	#2	First Round
2011	#3	First Round
2012	#8	First Round
2013	#4	Semifinals
2014	#9	Quarterfinals
2015	#2	Finals
2016	#4	Quarterfinals
2017	#2	Quarterfinals
2018	#3	Semifinals
2019	#6	Quarterfinals
2020	#4	Finals
2021	#4	Quarterfinals
2022	#9	Quarterfinals
2023	#5	Second Round
2024	#6	Semifinals
2025	#4	Quarterfinals
2026	#14	First Round

== Awards ==
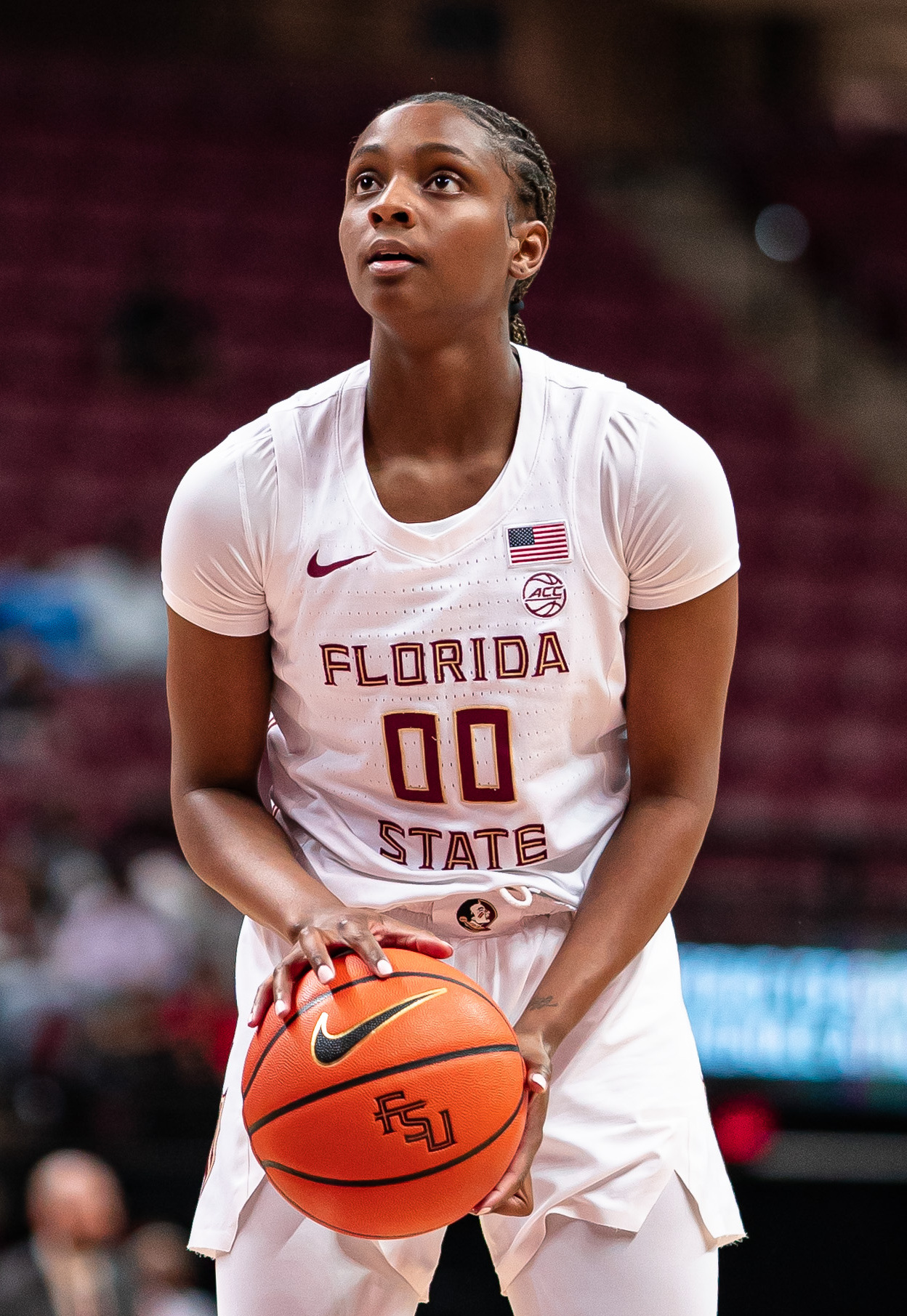
Ta'Niya Latson received multiple accolades during her time as a Seminole.

ACC Player of the Year

- Shakayla Thomas (2017)

ACC Defensive Player of the Year

- Christian Hunnicutt (2011)

ACC Rookie of the Year

- Ta’Niya Latson (2023)

ACC Sixth Player of the Year

- Chasity Clayton (2013)
- Shakayla Thomas (2015, 2016)
- Chatrice White (2017)

ACC Most Improved Player

- Makayla Timpson (2023)

ACC Coach of the Year

- Sue Semrau (2001, 2005, 2009, 2015)

ACC Women's Basketball Legend

- Cherry Rivers (2015)

Tamika Catchings Award

- Ta’Niya Latson (2023)

AP Coach of the Year

- Sue Semrau (2015)

WBCA Coach of the Year

- Sue Semrau (2015)

=== All-Americans ===
- Cierra Bravard
- Adut Bulgak
- Bev Burnett
- Wanda Burns
- Chris Davis
- Christy Derlak
- Nicki Ekhomu
- Sue Galkantas
- Kiah Gillespie
- Natasha Howard
- Ta’Niya Latson
- Jacinta Monroe
- Tia Paschal
- Allison Peercy
- Lorraine Rimson
- Leticia Romero
- Danielle Ryan
- Shakayla Thomas
- Makayla Timpson
- Imani Wright
- Brooke Wyckoff

== Home court ==
=== Donald L. Tucker Center ===
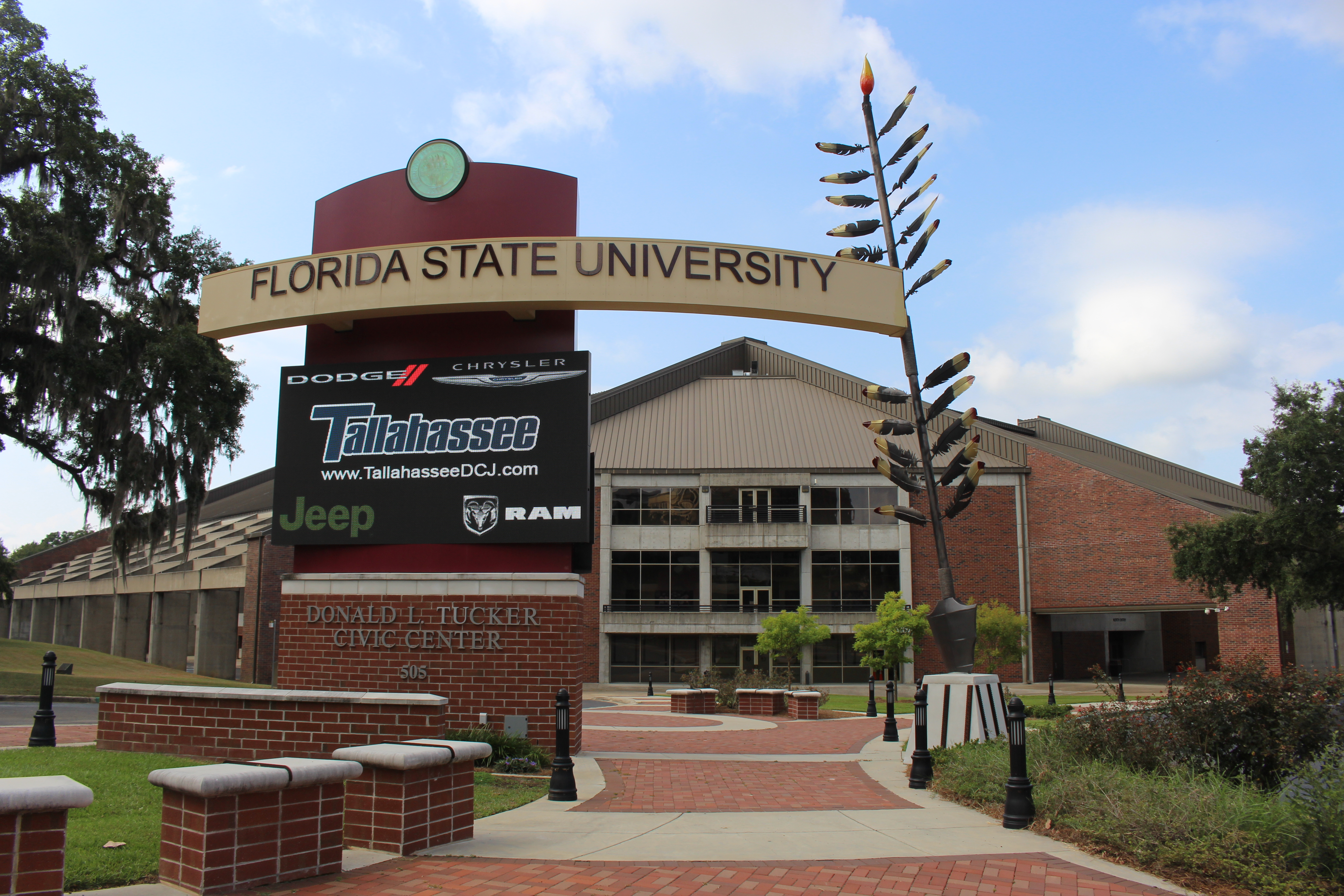
The Donald L. Tucker Center, home of the Seminoles.

The Seminoles play all of their home games at the Donald L. Tucker Center. It is a 18,000-square-foot (1,700 m^{2}) multi-purpose facility which has hosted over 25 years worth of Seminole games.

== Notable alumni ==
- Tanae Davis-Cain – professional WNBA basketball player, Detroit Shock
- Sue Galkantas – 1983 finalist for the Wade Trophy
- Roneeka Hodges – professional WNBA basketball player, Houston Comets
- Jacinta Monroe – professional WNBA basketball player, Washington Mystics and Tulsa Shock
- Britany Miller – professional WNBA basketball player, Detroit Shock
- Tia Paschal – professional WNBA basketball player, Chicago Sting
- Brooke Wyckoff – professional WNBA basketball player, Chicago Sky
- Cierra Bravard – professional WNBA basketball player, Seattle Storm
- Natasha Howard – professional WNBA basketball player, Indiana Fever, Seattle Storm, Minnesota Lynx

Florida State has sent 17 players to the WNBA draft.

- Latavia Coleman (Houston Comets)
- Brooke Wyckoff (Orlando Miracle)
- Levys Torres (Miami Sol)
- Roneeka Hodges (Houston Comets)
- Britany Miller (Detroit Shock)
- Tanae Davis-Cain (Detroit Shock)
- Mara Freshour (Seattle Storm)
- Jacinta Monroe (Washington Mystics)
- Natasha Howard (Minnesota Lynx)
- Adut Bulgak (New York Liberty)
- Leticia Romero (Connecticut Sun)
- Kai James (New York Liberty)
- Shakayla Thomas (Los Angeles Sparks)
- Imani Wright (Phoenix Mercury)
- Maria Conde (Chicago Sky)
- Kiah Gillespie (Chicago Sky)
- Makayla Timpson (Indiana Fever)

=== Retired numbers ===
Florida State Seminoles retired numbers
No.	Player	Position	Career	Year of Retirement
43	Sue Galkantas	F	1980-84	1989

== Roster ==
2026–27 Florida State Seminoles women's basketball team
Players
Coaches

Pos.	#	Name	Height	Year	Hometown
G	1	Mari Gerton	5 ft 8 in (1.73 m)	So	Princeton	Cincinnati, OH
G	3	Timaya Lewis-Eutsey	5 ft 8 in (1.73 m)	GS	Marshall	Trenton, NJ
F	4	Savannah Henderson	6 ft 3 in (1.91 m)	GS	Georgia	Orlando, FL
G	5	Jasmine Nivar	5 ft 10 in (1.78 m)	So	Campbell	Apex, NC
F	7	Joy Egbuna	6 ft 3 in (1.91 m)	So	Alabama	Dallas, TX
G	8	Asia Lee	5 ft 10 in (1.78 m)	Fr	Olathe North	Lenexa, KS
F	10	Aga Makurat	6 ft 3 in (1.91 m)	Sr	Sopocka Akademia Tenisowa	Sierakowice, Poland
F	11	Missy Odom	6 ft 2 in (1.88 m)	Fr	Montverde Academy	Parrish, AL
G	12	Emma Risch	6 ft 1 in (1.85 m)	Sr	Notre Dame	Melbourne, FL
G	13	Tatum Greene	6 ft 3 in (1.91 m)	Jr	Boston College	Baltimore, MD
G	15	Solé Williams	5 ft 9 in (1.75 m)	Sr	Princeton	Cincinnati, OH
G	17	Kennedy Loux	5 ft 10 in (1.78 m)	Fr	Providence School	Jacksonville, FL
F	20	Chamiah Francis	6 ft 2 in (1.88 m)	Fr	Booker T. Washington	Pensacola, FL
G	24	Morgan Stewart	5 ft 11 in (1.8 m)	Fr	St. John's College	Columbia, MD
F	25	Ice Brady	6 ft 3 in (1.91 m)	GS	UConn	San Diego, CA
F	32	Avery Treadwell	6 ft 3 in (1.91 m)	Sr	Bearden	Knoxville, TN

Head coach

- Brooke Wyckoff (Florida State)

Assistant coach(es)

- Morgan Toles (Florida State)
- Desma Thomas Bateast (Miami (FL))
- Adam Surguine (Lancaster Bible College)
- Ronald Hughey (Limestone)

Legend

- (C) Team captain
- (S) Suspended
- (I) Ineligible
- (W) Walk-on
- Injured
- Current redshirt

Roster
Last update: August 29, 2026

== See also ==
- Florida State Seminoles
- Florida State Seminoles men's basketball
- History of Florida State University
- List of Florida State University professional athletes
