= 2024 ACC women's basketball tournament =

American college basketball competition

- Classification: Division I
- Season: 2023–24
- Teams: 15
- Site: Greensboro Coliseum; Greensboro, North Carolina
- Champions: Notre Dame (6th title)
- Winning coach: Niele Ivey (1st title)
- MVP: Hannah Hidalgo (Notre Dame)
- Attendance: 67,081
- Television: ESPN, ACCN

2023–24 ACC women's basketball standings
	Conf.				Overall
Team	W		L	PCT	W		L	PCT
No. 18 Virginia Tech	14	–	4	.778	25	–	8	.758
No. 4 NC State	13	–	5	.722	31	–	7	.816
No. 20 Syracuse	13	–	5	.722	24	–	8	.750
No. 11 Notre Dame †	13	–	5	.722	28	–	7	.800
Louisville	12	–	6	.667	24	–	10	.706
Florida State	12	–	6	.667	23	–	11	.676
No. 17 Duke	11	–	7	.611	22	–	12	.647
North Carolina	11	–	7	.611	20	–	13	.606
Miami (FL)	8	–	10	.444	19	–	12	.613
Georgia Tech	7	–	11	.389	17	–	16	.515
Virginia	7	–	11	.389	16	–	16	.500
Clemson	5	–	13	.278	12	–	19	.387
Boston College	5	–	13	.278	14	–	19	.424
Wake Forest	2	–	16	.111	7	–	25	.219
Pittsburgh	2	–	16	.111	8	–	24	.250
† 2024 ACC tournament winner Rankings from AP poll

The 2024 ACC women's basketball tournament was the postseason women's basketball tournament for the Atlantic Coast Conference held at the Greensboro Coliseum in Greensboro, North Carolina, from March 6–10, 2024. The 2024 edition marked the 24th time in 25 years that the tournament was held in Greensboro.

The defending champions were the Virginia Tech Hokies. Virginia Tech entered this edition as the number one seed after winning the regular season. However, they were unable to defend their title, losing in the Semifinals to Notre Dame. Notre Dame would go on to win the tournament over NC State 55–51 in the Final. This was the sixth ACC Tournament championship for the Notre Dame program, all of which have come since they joined the conference in 2013. This was the first ACC Tournament title for head coach Niele Ivey. As champions, Notre Dame received the ACC's automatic bid to the 2024 NCAA Division I Women's Basketball Tournament.

== Seeds ==
All 15 ACC teams participated in the tournament. Teams were seeded by record within the conference, with a tiebreaker system to seed teams with identical conference records.

Seed	School	Conference Record	Tiebreaker
1	Virginia Tech‡†	14–4	
2	NC State†	13–5	2–0 vs. Syracuse & Notre Dame
3	Syracuse†	13–5	2–1 vs. NC State & Notre Dame
4	Notre Dame†	13–5	0–3 vs. NC State & Syracuse
5	Louisville#	12–6	1–0 vs. Florida State
6	Florida State#	12–6	0–1 vs. Louisville
7	Duke#	11–7	1–1 vs. vs. North Carolina; 1–1 vs. Virginia Tech
8	North Carolina#	11–7	1–1 vs. Duke; 0–2 vs. Virginia Tech
9	Miami#	8–10	
10	Georgia Tech	7–11	1–0 vs. Virginia
11	Virginia	7–11	0–1 vs. Georgia Tech
12	Clemson	5–13	1–0 vs. Boston College
13	Boston College	5–13	0–1 vs. Clemson
14	Wake Forest	2–16	1–0 vs. Pittsburgh
15	Pittsburgh	2–16	0–1 vs. Wake Forest
‡ – ACC regular season champions. † – Received a double-bye in the conference tournament. # – Received a single-bye in the conference tournament.

== Schedule ==
Session	Game	Time	Matchup	Score	Television	Attendance	U.S. Viewers (Millions)
First round – Wednesday, March 6							
Opening day	1	1:00 p.m.	No. 12 Clemson vs. No. 13 Boston College	72–85	ACCN	6,322	TBA
Opening day	2	3:30 p.m.	No. 10 Georgia Tech vs. No. 15 Pittsburgh	73–60	ACCN	6,322	TBA
Opening day	3	6:30 p.m.	No. 11 Virginia vs. No. 14 Wake Forest	55–58	ACCN	6,322	TBA
Second round – Thursday, March 7							
1	4	11:00 a.m.	No. 5 Louisville vs. No. 13 Boston College	58–55	ACCN	10,823	TBA
1	5	1:30 p.m.	No. 8 North Carolina vs. No. 9 Miami	59–60	ACCN	10,823	TBA
2	6	5:00 p.m.	No. 7 Duke vs. No. 10 Georgia Tech	70–58	ACCN	7,424	TBA
2	7	7:30 p.m.	No. 6 Florida State vs. No. 14 Wake Forest	70–53	ACCN	7,424	TBA
Quarterfinals – Friday, March 8							
3	8	11:00 a.m.	No. 4 Notre Dame vs. No. 5 Louisville	77–68	ACCN	15,202	TBA
3	9	1:30 p.m.	No. 1 Virginia Tech vs. No. 9 Miami	55–47	ACCN	15,202	TBA
4	10	5:00 p.m.	No. 2 NC State vs. No. 7 Duke	54–51	ACCN	7,720	TBA
4	11	7:30 p.m.	No. 3 Syracuse vs. No. 6 Florida State	65–78	ACCN	7,720	TBA
Semifinals – Saturday, March 9							
5	12	12:00 p.m.	No. 1 Virginia Tech vs. No. 4 Notre Dame	53–82	ACCN	10,488	TBA
5	13	2:30 p.m.	No. 2 NC State vs. No. 6 Florida State	69–43	ACCN	10,488	TBA
Championship – Sunday, March 10							
6	14	1:00 p.m.	No. 4 Notre Dame vs. No. 2 NC State	55–51	ESPN	9,102	0.68
Game times in ET. Rankings denote tournament seed.							

== Bracket ==
First round Wednesday, March 6
12	Clemson	72
13	Boston College	85
10	Georgia Tech	73
15	Pittsburgh	60
11	Virginia	55
14	Wake Forest	58

Second round Thursday, March 7
8	North Carolina	59
9	Miami	60
5	#24 Louisville	58
13	Boston College	55
7	Duke	70
10	Georgia Tech	58
6	Florida State	70
14	Wake Forest	53

Quarterfinals; Friday, March 8
1	#11 Virginia Tech	55
9	Miami	47
4	#14 Notre Dame	77
5	#24 Louisville	68
2	#10 NC State	54
7	Duke	51
3	#20 Syracuse	65
6	Florida State	78

Semifinals; Saturday, March 9
1	#11 Virginia Tech	53
4	#14 Notre Dame	82
2	#10 NC State	69
6	Florida State	43

Championship; Sunday, March 10
4	#14 Notre Dame	55
2	#10 NC State	51

== Game summaries ==
=== First round ===
ACCN

March 6
1:00 p.m.

Report

No. 12 Clemson 72, No. 13 Boston College 85
Scoring by quarter: 13–23, 21–19, 17–22, 21–21
Pts: Harris/Whitehorn (26); Rebs: Whitehorn (6); Asts: Harris (4)	Pts: Todd (24); Rebs: Sidberry (10); Asts: Ivey (12)

Greensboro Coliseum
Greensboro, NC
Referees: Maj Forsberg
Denise Brooks
Tiara Cruse

ACCN

March 6
3:30 p.m.

Report

No. 10 Georgia Tech 73, No. 15 Pittsburgh 60
Scoring by quarter: 19–18, 19–14, 10–15, 25–13
Pts: Morgan (24); Rebs: Morgan (11); Asts: Morgan (4)	Pts: Malcolm/Perkins (16); Rebs: King (6); Asts: Timmerson/Perkins (3)

Greensboro Coliseum
Greensboro, NC
Referees: Pulani Spurlock-Welch
Angelica Suffren
Mark Resch

ACCN

March 6
6:30 p.m.

Report

No. 11 Virginia 55, No. 14 Wake Forest 58
Scoring by quarter: 11–11, 12–14, 23–10, 9–23
Pts: Taylor (18); Rebs: Johnson (9); Asts: Clark (6)	Pts: Williams (25); Rebs: Williams (9); Asts: Conley/Deeble/Williams (2)

Greensboro Coliseum
Greensboro, NC
Attendance: 6,322
Referees: Dee Kantner
Joe Vaszily
Talisa Green

=== Second round ===
ACCN

March 7
11:00 a.m.

Report

No. 5 Louisville 58, No. 13 Boston College 55
Scoring by quarter: 20–18, 13–11, 9–15, 16–11
Pts: Harris (14); Rebs: Harris/Jefferson (9); Asts: Taylor (4)	Pts: Sidberry (22); Rebs: Daley/Waggoner (7); Asts: Sidberry (2)

Greensboro Coliseum
Greensboro, NC
Referees: Rod Creech
Meadow Overstreet
Saif Esho

ACCN

March 7
1:30 p.m.

Report

No. 8 North Carolina 59, No. 9 Miami 60
Scoring by quarter: 20–13, 17–17, 10–15, 12–15
Pts: Kelly/Ustby (15); Rebs: Kelly (9); Asts: Ustby (4)	Pts: Day-Wilson (13); Rebs: Spearman (10); Asts: Day-Wilson (5)

Greensboro Coliseum
Greensboro, NC
Attendance: 10,823
Referees: Eric Brewton
Dee Kantner
Karen Preato

ACCN

March 7
5:00 p.m.

Report

No. 7 Duke 70, No. 10 Georgia Tech 58
Scoring by quarter: 17–8, 21–18, 18–17, 14–15
Pts: Okananwa (15); Rebs: Brown (8); Asts: Mair (7)	Pts: Morgan (19); Rebs: Morgan (8); Asts: Morgan (7)

Greensboro Coliseum
Greensboro, NC
Referees: Joseph Vaszily
Billy Smith
Talisa Green

ACCN

March 7
7:30 p.m.

Report

No. 6 Florida State 70, No. 14 Wake Forest 53
Scoring by quarter: 19–9, 18–8, 16–17, 17–19
Pts: Timpson (22); Rebs: Timpson (13); Asts: Gordon (4)	Pts: Scruggs (14); Rebs: Cowles (7); Asts: Deeble/Williams (4)

Greensboro Coliseum
Greensboro, NC
Attendance: 7,424
Referees: Jeff Smith
Fatou Oissoko-Stephens
Carla Fountain

=== Quarterfinals ===
ACCN

March 8
11:00 a.m.

Report

No. 4 Notre Dame 77, No. 5 Louisville 68
Scoring by quarter: 19–10, 15–7, 17–22, 26–29
Pts: Citron (26); Rebs: Hidalgo (6); Asts: Hidalgo (6)	Pts: Curry (26); Rebs: Harris (10); Asts: Curry (3)

Greensboro Coliseum
Greensboro, NC
Referees: Karen Preato
Katie Lukanich
Jeffery Smith

ACCN

March 8
1:30 p.m.

Report

No. 1 Virginia Tech 55, No. 9 Miami 47
Scoring by quarter: 16–12, 9–8, 11–13, 19–14
Pts: Amoore (27); Rebs: Summiel (8); Asts: Wenzel (5)	Pts: Roberts (12); Rebs: Williams (12); Asts: Day-Wilson/Williams (2)

Greensboro Coliseum
Greensboro, NC
Attendance: 15,202
Referees: Saif Esho
Rod Creech
Carla Fountain

ACCN

March 8
5:00 p.m.

Report

No. 2 NC State 54, No. 7 Duke 51
Scoring by quarter: 21–16, 8–11, 14–15, 11–9
Pts: James (16); Rebs: James/Rivers (8); Asts: Brooks (5)	Pts: Okananwa (12); Rebs: Okananwa (11); Asts: Mair (3)

Greensboro Coliseum
Greensboro, NC
Referees: Meadow Overstreet
Ed Sidlasky
Pualani Spurlock

ACCN

March 8
7:30 p.m.

Report

No. 3 Syracuse 65, No. 6 Florida State 78
Scoring by quarter: 18–23, 9–16, 18–28, 20–11
Pts: Fair (23); Rebs: Fair (9); Asts: Fair (3)	Pts: Latson (25); Rebs: Timpson (18); Asts: Latson/Turnage (3)

Greensboro Coliseum
Greensboro, NC
Attendance: 7,720
Referees: Bruce Morris
Talisa Green
Eric Brewton

=== Semifinals ===
ACCN

March 9
12:00 p.m.

Report

No. 1 Virginia Tech 53, No. 4 Notre Dame 82
Scoring by quarter: 12–15, 11–18, 17–28, 13–21
Pts: Amoore (24); Rebs: Summiel (18); Asts: Amoore (3)	Pts: Citron (19); Rebs: Citron (17); Asts: Hidalgo (6)

Greensboro Coliseum
Greensboro, NC
Attendance: 10,488
Referees: Mark Resch
Tiara Cruse
Pualani Spurlock

ACCN

March 9
2:30 p.m.

Report

No. 2 NC State 69, No. 6 Florida State 43
Scoring by quarter: 20–11, 15–9, 15–9, 19–14
Pts: James (23); Rebs: Collins (13); Asts: Brooks/James/Rivers (4)	Pts: Latson (16); Rebs: Timpson/Turnage (9); Asts: Bejedi/Bonner (2)

Greensboro Coliseum
Greensboro, NC
Attendance: 10,488
Referees: Katie Lukanich
Karen Preato
Angelica Suffren

=== Final ===
ESPN

March 10
1:00 p.m.

Report

No. 2 NC State 51, No. 4 Notre Dame 55
Scoring by quarter: 15–14, 7–14, 21–13, 8–14
Pts: Baldwin (14); Rebs: Baldwin/Brooks (7); Asts: James (5)	Pts: Hidalgo (22); Rebs: Westbeld (7); Asts: Hidalgo (6)

Greensboro Coliseum
Greensboro, NC
Attendance: 9,102
Referees: Dee Kantner
Maj Forsberg
Joe Vaszily

== Awards and honors ==
2024 ACC Women's Basketball All-Tournament Teams
First Team	Second Team
Hannah Hidalgo – Notre Dame (MVP) Sonia Citron – Notre Dame Maddy Westbeld – Notre Dame Aziaha James – NC State Saniya Rivers – NC State	Ta'Niya Latson – Florida State Makayla Timpson – Florida State Tonie Morgan – Georgia Tech River Baldwin – NC State Georgia Amoore – Virginia Tech

== See also ==
- 2024 ACC men's basketball tournament
