= Makayla Timpson =

American basketball player (born 2002)

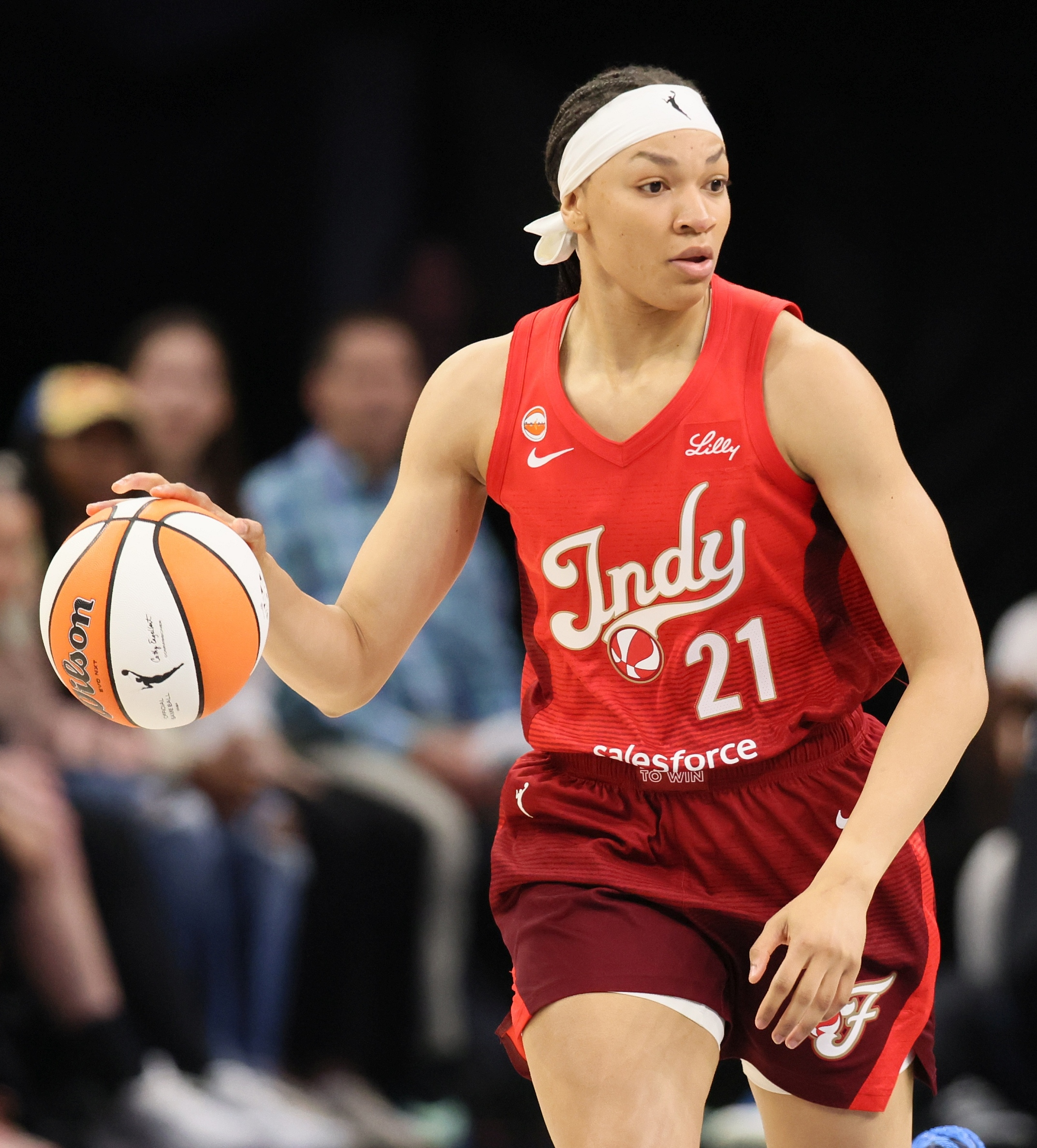
- Timpson with the Indiana Fever in 2026

No. 21 – Indiana Fever
- Position: Forward / center
- League: WNBA

Personal information
- Born: September 20, 2002 (age 24) Edison, Georgia, U.S.
- Listed height: 6 ft 2 in (1.88 m)
- Listed weight: 177 lb (80 kg)

Career information
- High school: Early County (Early County, Georgia)
- College: Florida State (2021–2025)
- WNBA draft: 2025: 2nd round, 19th overall pick
- Drafted by: Indiana Fever

Career history
- 2025–present: Indiana Fever
- 2025–2026: USK Praha

Career highlights
- WNBA Commissioner's Cup Champion (2025); 2× First-team All-ACC (2024, 2025); ACC Most Improved Player (2023); 3× ACC All-Defensive Team (2023–2025); ACC All-Freshman Team (2022)
- Stats at Basketball Reference

Makayla Timpson (born September 20, 2002) is an American professional basketball player for the Indiana Fever of the Women's National Basketball Association (WNBA). She played college basketball at Florida State. She was selected 19th overall by the Fever in the 2025 WNBA draft.

== High school career ==
Timpson attended Early County High School in Early County, Georgia. During her junior year, she averaged 22.7 points and 10.8 rebounds per game. She committed to play college basketball at Florida State.

== College career ==
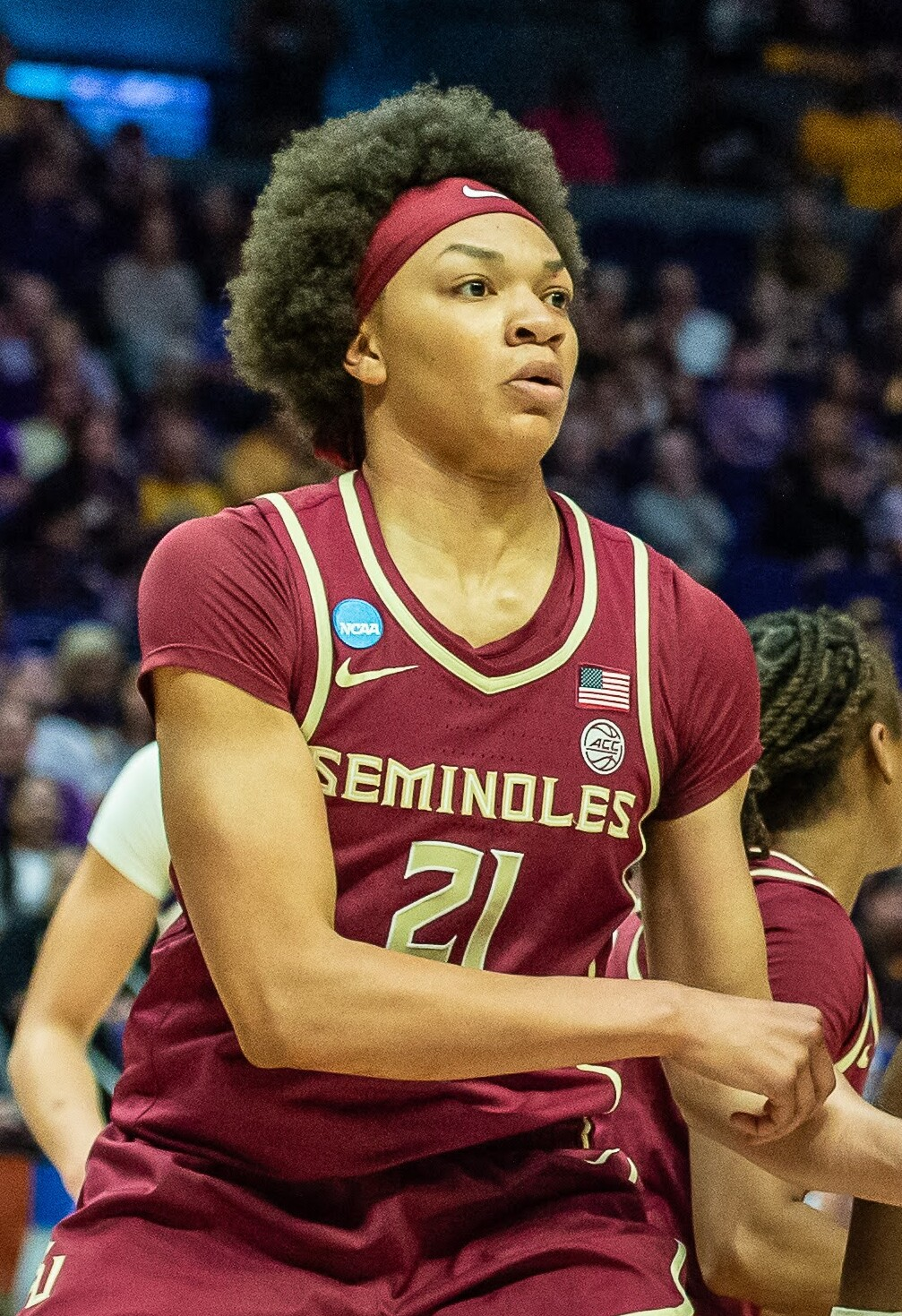
Timpson with Florida State in 2025

During the 2021–22 season, in her freshman year, she appeared in all 31 games, with one start, and averaged 6.6 points and 3.6 rebounds per game. During the 2022–23 season, in her sophomore year, she started all 33 games and averaged 13.2 points, 8.8 rebounds, and 2.1 blocks per game. Following the season she was named to the ACC All-Defensive team, All-ACC second team, and the ACC Most Improved Player.

During the 2023–24 season, in her junior year, she started all 34 games and averaged a double-double of 14.3 points, 10.0 rebounds, and 2.5 blocks per game. She set single-season program records in rebounds (341), blocked shots (87) and double-doubles (18). Following the season she was named to the ACC All-Defensive team, and an All-ACC first team honoree.

During the 2024–25 season, in her senior year, she started all 33 games and averaged a double-double of 17.5 points, 10.6 rebounds, 1.0 assists and 3.1 blocks per game. She set single-season program records in rebounds (350) and blocks (103), surpassing her records she set the previous season. On February 9, 2025, in a game against NC State, she recorded nine rebounds to become the third player in program history to surpass 1,000 career rebounds, following Sue Galkantas and Natasha Howard. Following the season she was named to the ACC All-Defensive team, and an All-ACC first team honoree for the second consecutive year. She was also named a semifinalist for the Naismith Defensive Player of the Year, a top-five finalist for the Katrina McClain Award, and a WBCA All-American honorable mention.

She finished her career with 1,706 points, 1,094 rebounds, and 290 blocks. She is the program's all-time leader in double-doubles (47).

== Professional career ==
=== WNBA ===
==== Indiana Fever (2025–present) ====
On April 14, 2025, Timpson was drafted in the second round, 19th overall, by the Indiana Fever in the 2025 WNBA draft. She made her debut on May 17, 2025, in a 93–58 win over the Chicago Sky, scoring four points in three minutes off the bench. She played sparingly in the first two months of the season, logging a total of 14 minutes in the first 15 games, but her role grew in July 2025. On July 27, 2025, in a 93–78 win over the Sky, she scored a then career-high 14 points in 22 minutes. During the 2025 WNBA season, in her rookie year, she averaged 2.6 points and 1.8 rebounds in 7.1 minutes per game during the regular season. She also contributed valuable minutes during the Fever's playoff run.

She made her first career start on July 17, 2026, in a game against the Seattle Storm, after starter Aliyah Boston missed the game due to injury. On July 31, 2026, she scored a career-high 15 points in a 112–98 win against the Toronto Tempo. On August 16, 2026, Makayla set a new career high against the Atlanta Dream when she scored 20 points in an overtime win for the Fever.

=== Overseas ===
Timpson signed with USK Praha of the Czech Women's Basketball League for the 2025–26 season.

== Career statistics ==
Legend
| GP | Games played | GS | Games started | MPG | Minutes per game | RPG | Rebounds per game |
| APG | Assists per game | SPG | Steals per game | BPG | Blocks per game | PPG | Points per game |
| TO | Turnovers per game | FG% | Field-goal percentage | 3P% | 3-point field-goal percentage | FT% | Free-throw percentage |
| **Bold** | Career best | ° | League leader |

=== WNBA ===
==== Regular season ====
WNBA regular season statistics
| Year | Team | GP | GS | MPG | FG% | 3P% | FT% | RPG | APG | SPG | BPG | TO | PPG |
|---|---|---|---|---|---|---|---|---|---|---|---|---|---|
| 2025 | Indiana | 31 | 0 | 7.1 | .561 | — | .667 | 1.8 | .0 | .4 | .3 | **.3** | 2.6 |
| 2026 | Indiana | **43** | **14** | **19.1** | **.641** | — | **.694** | **4.9** | **.5** | **.6** | **.8** | .8 | **5.7** |
| **Career** | 2 years, 1 team | 74 | 14 | 14.0 | .620 | — | .685 | 3.6 | .3 | .5 | .6 | .6 | 4.4 |

==== Playoffs ====
WNBA playoff statistics
| Year | Team | GP | GS | MPG | FG% | 3P% | FT% | RPG | APG | SPG | BPG | TO | PPG |
|---|---|---|---|---|---|---|---|---|---|---|---|---|---|
| 2025 | Indiana | **8** | 0 | 6.4 | **.667** | — | **.750** | 1.9 | .0 | .3 | **.4** | **.4** | 2.3 |
| 2026 | Indiana | 3 | **3** | **15.3** | .417 | — | .500 | **4.7** | **.7** | **1.0** | .0 | 1.7 | **4.0** |
| **Career** | 2 years, 1 team | 11 | 3 | 8.8 | .524 | — | .667 | 2.6 | .2 | .5 | .3 | .7 | 2.7 |

=== College ===
NCAA statistics
| Year | Team | GP | GS | MPG | FG% | 3P% | FT% | RPG | APG | SPG | BPG | TO | PPG |
|---|---|---|---|---|---|---|---|---|---|---|---|---|---|
| 2021–22 | Florida State | 31 | 1 | 17.8 | **.623** | .000 | .576 | 3.6 | .8 | .5 | 1.0 | **1.2** | 6.6 |
| 2022–23 | Florida State | 33 | 33 | 24.9 | .581 | .000 | .718 | 8.8 | .3 | 1.1 | 2.1 | 1.3 | 13.2 |
| 2023–24 | Florida State | **34** | **34** | 29.8 | .566° | **.333** | .713 | 10.0 | .4 | 1.4 | 2.6 | 1.3 | 14.3 |
| 2024–25 | Florida State | 33 | 33 | **30.4** | .543° | .250 | **.760** | **10.6** | **1.0** | **1.8** | **3.1**° | 1.8 | **17.5** |
| **Career** | | 131 | 101 | 25.9 | .568 | .250 | .712 | 8.4 | .6 | 1.2 | 2.2 | 1.4 | 13.0 |
