= 2023–24 Florida State Seminoles women's basketball team =

Intercollegiate basketball season

2023–24 Florida State Seminoles women's basketball

NCAA tournament, First round
- Conference: Atlantic Coast Conference
- Record: 23–11 (12–6 ACC)
- Head coach: Brooke Wyckoff (3rd season)
- Assistant coaches: Bill Ferrara; Morgan Toles; Desma Thomas Bateast; Adam Surguine
- Home arena: Donald L. Tucker Center (Capacity: 12,100)

2023–24 ACC women's basketball standings
	Conf.				Overall
Team	W		L	PCT	W		L	PCT
No. 18 Virginia Tech	14	–	4	.778	25	–	8	.758
No. 4 NC State	13	–	5	.722	31	–	7	.816
No. 20 Syracuse	13	–	5	.722	24	–	8	.750
No. 11 Notre Dame †	13	–	5	.722	28	–	7	.800
Louisville	12	–	6	.667	24	–	10	.706
Florida State	12	–	6	.667	23	–	11	.676
No. 17 Duke	11	–	7	.611	22	–	12	.647
North Carolina	11	–	7	.611	20	–	13	.606
Miami (FL)	8	–	10	.444	19	–	12	.613
Georgia Tech	7	–	11	.389	17	–	16	.515
Virginia	7	–	11	.389	16	–	16	.500
Clemson	5	–	13	.278	12	–	19	.387
Boston College	5	–	13	.278	14	–	19	.424
Wake Forest	2	–	16	.111	7	–	25	.219
Pittsburgh	2	–	16	.111	8	–	24	.250
† 2024 ACC tournament winner Rankings from AP poll

The 2023–24 Florida State Seminoles women's basketball team represented Florida State University during the 2023–24 NCAA Division I women's basketball season. They were led by third-year head coach Brooke Wyckoff, who previously served as interim head coach for the team during the 2020–21 season. The Seminoles played their home games at the Donald L. Tucker Center on the university's Tallahassee, Florida campus. They competed as members of the Atlantic Coast Conference (ACC).

The Seminoles started the season ranked eighteenth in the country and won their first five games to start the season. This five game stretch included a win over eleventh-ranked Tennessee and a rivalry win over Florida. Their first loss of the season came in the Ball Dawgs Classic to fourth-ranked Stanford. The Seminoles also lost their ACC–SEC Challenge game to Arkansas and their only other non-conference loss came against second-ranked UCLA. They finished the non-conference season 9–3. They started off their ACC regular season schedule with winning five of their first six games, with the only loss being at third-ranked NC State in overtime. The Seminoles were ranked as highly as number fifteen in the nation before going on a three-game losing skid. They followed that with winning six of their next seven games, with the only loss being in double overtime to twelfth-ranked Notre Dame. They would split the last two games of the regular season, losing to twenty-second-ranked Louisville and defeating Clemson in the final game of the season.

The Seminoles finished the season 23–11 overall and 12–6 in ACC play, to finish in a tie for fifth place. As the sixth seed in the ACC tournament, they defeated fourteenth seed Wake Forest in the second round and third seed Syracuse in the quarterfinals before losing to second seed NC State in the semifinals. They received an at-large invitation to the NCAA tournament, marking the eleventh consecutive year the team has qualified for the tournament. As the ninth seed in the Portland 4 were defeated by eighth seed Alabama in the first round to end their season.

== Previous season ==
The Seminoles finished the season 23–10 overall and 12–6 in ACC play, to finish in a tie for fourth place. As the fifth seed in the ACC tournament, they earned a bye into the second round where they were upset by twelfth seed Wake Forest. They received an at-large bid to the NCAA tournament, marking the tenth consecutive year the team has qualified for the tournament. As the seventh seed in the Seattle 4 Region, they lost to ten seed Georgia to end their season. A contributing factor to their postseason losses was the absence of Ta'Niya Latson who lead the team and the ACC in scoring during the regular season and won ACC Freshman of the Year.

== Off-season ==
=== Departures ===
Departures
Name	Number	Pos.	Height	Year	Hometown	Reason for departure
Jazmine Massengill	1	G	6'0"	Graduate Student	Chattanooga, TN	Graduated
Taylor O'Brien	11	G	5'9"	Graduate Student	Lafayette Hill, PA	Graduated
Erin Howard	23	F	6'1"	(redshirt) Senior	Madison, WI	Graduated
Valencia Myers	32	F	6'3"	Senior	Solon, OH	Graduated

=== Incoming transfers ===
Incoming transfers
Name	Number	Pos.	Height	Year	Hometown	Previous school
Alexis Tucker	2	G	5'11"	Graduate student	Hawthorne, CA	UC Santa Barbara
Sakyia White	22	F	6'1"	Junior	Tuscaloosa, AL	Jones College
Amaya Bonner	24	G	6'0"	Sophomore	Fremont, CA	California

=== 2023 recruiting class ===
College recruiting information
Name	Hometown	School	Height	Weight	Commit date
Lucia Navarro; F	Valencia, Spain	NB Paterna	6 ft 0 in (1.83 m)	N/A	
Lucia Navarro; F	Recruit ratings: No ratings found				
Carla Viegas; G	Málaga, Spain	CAB Estepona	5 ft 9 in (1.75 m)	N/A	
Carla Viegas; G	Recruit ratings: No ratings found				
Avery Treadwell; F	Knoxville, TN	Bearden	6 ft 3 in (1.91 m)	N/A	
Avery Treadwell; F	Recruit ratings: No ratings found				
Overall recruit ranking:
Note: In many cases, Scout, Rivals, 247Sports, On3, and ESPN may conflict in their listings of height and weight.; In these cases, the average was taken. ESPN grades are on a 100-point scale.; Sources:

== Roster ==
2023–24 Florida State Seminoles women's basketball team
Players
Coaches

Pos.	#	Name	Height	Year	Previous school	Hometown
G	00	Ta'Niya Latson	5 ft 8 in (1.73 m)	So	American Heritage	Miami, FL
G	1	Brianna Turnage	6 ft 1 in (1.85 m)	So	Westlake	Atlanta, GA
G	2	Alexis Tucker	5 ft 11 in (1.8 m)	GS	Junípero Serra; UC Santa Barbara	Hawthorne, CA
G	3	O'Mariah Gordon	5 ft 4 in (1.63 m)	Jr	Braden River	Bradenton, FL
G	4	Sara Bejedi	5 ft 7 in (1.7 m)	GS	Arizona State	Helsinki, Finland
F	5	Mariana Valenzuela	6 ft 2 in (1.88 m)	Jr	Montverde Academy	Mazatlán, Mexico
F	11	Lucia Navarro	6 ft 0 in (1.83 m)	Fr	NB Paterna	Valencia, Spain
G	13	Carla Viegas	5 ft 9 in (1.75 m)	Fr	CAB Estepona	Málaga, Spain
F	21	Makayla Timpson	6 ft 2 in (1.88 m)	Jr	Early County	Edison, GA
F	22	Sakyia White	6 ft 1 in (1.85 m)	Jr	Central; Jones College	Tuscaloosa, AL
G	24	Amaya Bonner	6 ft 0 in (1.83 m)	So	Santa Cruz; California	Fremont, CA
F	32	Avery Treadwell	6 ft 3 in (1.91 m)	Fr	Bearden	Knoxville, TN

Head coach

- Brooke Wyckoff (Florida State)

Assistant coach(es)

- Bill Ferrara (Florida)
- Morgan Toles (Florida State)
- Desma Thomas Bateast (Miami (FL))
- Adam Surguine (Lancaster Bible College)

Legend

- (C) Team captain
- (S) Suspended
- (I) Ineligible
- (W) Walk-on
- Injured
- Current redshirt

Roster
Last update: October 30, 2023

== Schedule and results ==
Date time, TV	Rank^{#}	Opponent^{#}	Result	Record	Site (attendance) city, state
Exhibition
October 26, 2023*; 6:00 p.m.	No. 18	Flagler	W 124–50	–	Donald L. Tucker Center (–); Tallahassee, FL
November 1, 2023*; 6:00 p.m.	No. 18	Clayton State	W 97–52	–	Donald L. Tucker Center (–); Tallahassee, FL
Non-conference regular season
November 6, 2023*; 6:00 p.m., ACCNX	No. 18	Charleston Southern	W 99–63	1–0	Donald L. Tucker Center (1,930); Tallahassee, FL
November 9, 2023*; 6:00 p.m., ESPN2	No. 18	No. 11 Tennessee	W 92–91	2–0	Donald L. Tucker Center (2,898); Tallahassee, FL
November 17, 2023*; 4:00 p.m., SECN+	No. 12	at Florida; Rivalry	W 79–75	3–0	O'Connell Center (1,518); Gainesville, FL
November 19, 2023*; 2:00 p.m., ACCNX	No. 12	South Alabama	W 80–45	4–0	Donald L. Tucker Center (1,889); Tallahassee, FL
November 22, 2023*; 2:00 p.m., FloSports	No. 13	vs. Northwestern; Ball Dawgs Classic semifinals	W 90–52	5–0	Dollar Loan Center; Henderson, NV
November 24, 2023*; 9:30 p.m., FloSports	No. 13	vs. No. 4 Stanford; Ball Dawgs Classic championship	L 88–100	5–1	Dollar Loan Center; Henderson, NV
November 30, 2023*; 7:00 p.m., ESPN2	No. 15	Arkansas; ACC–SEC Challenge	L 58–71	5–2	Donald L. Tucker Center (2,216); Tallahassee, FL
December 3, 2023*; 2:00 p.m., ACCNX	No. 15	Kent State	W 76–49	6–2	Donald L. Tucker Center (1,237); Tallahassee, FL
December 7, 2023*; 11:00 a.m., ACCNX	No. 20	Jacksonville	W 99–73	7–2	Donald L. Tucker Center (3,169); Tallahassee, FL
December 10, 2023*; 12:00 p.m., ESPN2	No. 20	vs. No. 2 UCLA; Basketball Hall of Fame Women's Showcase	L 78–95	7–3	Mohegan Sun Arena (8,428); Uncasville, CT
December 17, 2023*; 2:00 p.m., FloHoops	No. 22	at Drexel	W 76–56	8–3	Daskalakis Athletic Center (476); Philadelphia, PA
December 20, 2023*; 6:00 p.m., ACCNX	No. 21	Alabama State	W 110–45	9–3	Donald L. Tucker Center (1,244); Tallahassee, FL
ACC regular season
December 29, 2023; 2:00 p.m., ACCNX	No. 22	Georgia Tech	W 95–80	10–3 (1–0)	Donald L. Tucker Center (1,613); Tallahassee, FL
December 31, 2023; 12:00 p.m., ACCNX	No. 22	Wake Forest	W 73–61	11–3 (2–0)	Donald L. Tucker Center (1,407); Tallahassee, FL
January 4, 2024; 7:00 p.m., ACCNX	No. 22	at No. 3 NC State	L 80–88 ^{OT}	11–4 (2–1)	Reynolds Coliseum (5,500); Raleigh, NC
January 7, 2024; 4:00 p.m., ACCN	No. 22	at Clemson	W 78–72	12–4 (3–1)	Littlejohn Coliseum (1,136); Clemson, SC
January 11, 2024; 6:00 p.m., ACCNX	No. 21	No. 20 North Carolina	W 70–62	13–4 (4–1)	Donald L. Tucker Center (1,946); Tallahassee, FL
January 14, 2024; 1:00 p.m., ESPN	No. 21	No. 11 Virginia Tech	W 89–81	14–4 (5–1)	Donald L. Tucker Center (3,044); Tallahassee, FL
January 18, 2024; 7:00 p.m., ACCNX	No. 15	at Syracuse	L 73–79	14–5 (5–2)	JMA Wireless Dome (2,533); Syracuse, NY
January 21, 2024; 2:00 p.m., ACCNX	No. 15	Virginia	L 87–91	14–6 (5–3)	Donald L. Tucker Center (2,081); Tallahassee, FL
January 25, 2024; 6:00 p.m., ACCN	No. 23	at Duke	L 46–88	14–7 (5–4)	Cameron Indoor Stadium (1,779); Durham, NC
January 28, 2024; 4:00 p.m., ACCNX	No. 23	at Georgia Tech	W 78–67	15–7 (6–4)	McCamish Pavilion (2,147); Atlanta, GA
February 4, 2024; 11:00 a.m., The CW		Miami (FL); Rivalry	W 75–68	16–7 (7–4)	Donald L. Tucker Center (2,277); Tallahassee, FL
February 8, 2024; 7:00 p.m., ACCNX		at Pittsburgh	W 76–60	17–7 (8–4)	Peterson Events Center (1,124); Pittsburgh, PA
February 11, 2024; 12:00 p.m., ACCNX		No. 12 Notre Dame	L 92–94 ^{2OT}	17–8 (8–5)	Donald L. Tucker Center (2,643); Tallahassee, FL
February 15, 2024; 6:00 p.m., ACCNX		at Wake Forest	W 71–63	18–8 (9–5)	LJVM Coliseum (736); Winston-Salem, NC
February 18, 2024; 4:00 p.m., ACCNX		at Miami (FL)	W 75–68	19–8 (10–5)	Watsco Center (3,584); Coral Gables, FL
February 22, 2024; 6:00 p.m., ACCNX		Boston College	W 84–71	20–8 (11–5)	Donald L. Tucker Center (1,744); Tallahassee, FL
February 29, 2024; 8:00 p.m., ACCNX		at No. 22 Louisville	L 55–70	20–9 (11–6)	KFC Yum! Center (7,932); Louisville, KY
March 3, 2024; 4:00 p.m., ACCN		Clemson	W 82–79 ^{OT}	21–9 (12–6)	Donald L. Tucker Center (2,445); Tallahassee, FL
ACC women's tournament
March 7, 2024; 7:30 p.m., ACCN	(6)	vs. (14) Wake Forest; Second round	W 70–53	22–9	Greensboro Coliseum (7,424); Greensboro, NC
March 8, 2024; 7:30 p.m., ACCN	(6)	vs. (3) No. 20 Syracuse; Quarterfinals	W 78–65	23–9	Greensboro Coliseum (7,720); Greensboro, NC
March 9, 2024; 2:30 p.m., ACCN	(6)	vs. (2) No. 10 NC State; Semifinals	L 43–69	23–10	Greensboro Coliseum (10,488); Greensboro, NC
NCAA women's tournament
March 22, 2024*; 5:30 p.m., ESPN2	(9 P4)	vs. (8 P4) Alabama; First round	L 74–82	23–11	Moody Center (7,487); Austin, TX
*Non-conference game. ^{#}Rankings from AP poll. (#) Tournament seedings in parentheses. P4=Portland 4. All times are in Eastern Time.

== Rankings ==
Ranking movements Legend: ██ Increase in ranking ██ Decrease in ranking — = Not ranked RV = Received votes т = Tied with team above or below
	Week																				
Poll	Pre	1	2	3	4	5	6	7	8	9	10	11	12	13	14	15	16	17	18	19	Final
AP	18	12	13	15	20	22	21т	22	22	21	15	23	RV	RV	—	—	RV	—	RV	RV	—
Coaches	22	13	13	15	20	22	22	22	22	20	18	24	RV	RV	RV	RV	—	—	—	—	—

== Awards ==
=== Watchlists ===
Award	Player
Wade Trophy	Ta'Niya Latson
Wooden Award	Ta'Niya Latson
Naismith Trophy	Ta'Niya Latson
Ann Meyers-Drysdale Shooting Guard of the Year	Ta'Niya Latson
Preseason All-ACC	Ta'Niya Latson; Makayla Timpson

=== Honors ===
Honors
Player	Award	Ref.
Ta'Niya Latson	ACC Player of the Week (Week Eight); National Player of the Week (Week Eight); All-ACC First Team; ACC All-Tournament Second Team; Associated Press Honorable Mention All-American; WBCA NCAA Division I Coaches' All-American; Ann Meyers-Drysdale Shooting Guard of the Year finalist	
Sara Bejedi	ACC Player of the Week (Week Ten); ESPN Player of the Week (Week Ten); Naismith Trophy Player of the Week (Week Ten); USBWA National Player of the Week (Week Ten)	
Makayla Timpson	All-ACC First Team; All-ACC Defensive Team; ACC All-Tournament Second Team	
