= 2023–24 Wake Forest Demon Deacons women's basketball team =

Intercollegiate basketball season

2023–24 Wake Forest Demon Deacons women's basketball
- Conference: Atlantic Coast Conference
- Record: 7–25 (2–16 ACC)
- Head coach: Megan Gebbia (2nd season)
- Assistant coaches: Nikki Flores; Emily Stallings; Millette Green
- Home arena: LJVM Coliseum

2023–24 ACC women's basketball standings
	Conf.				Overall
Team	W		L	PCT	W		L	PCT
No. 18 Virginia Tech	14	–	4	.778	25	–	8	.758
No. 4 NC State	13	–	5	.722	31	–	7	.816
No. 20 Syracuse	13	–	5	.722	24	–	8	.750
No. 11 Notre Dame †	13	–	5	.722	28	–	7	.800
Louisville	12	–	6	.667	24	–	10	.706
Florida State	12	–	6	.667	23	–	11	.676
No. 17 Duke	11	–	7	.611	22	–	12	.647
North Carolina	11	–	7	.611	20	–	13	.606
Miami (FL)	8	–	10	.444	19	–	12	.613
Georgia Tech	7	–	11	.389	17	–	16	.515
Virginia	7	–	11	.389	16	–	16	.500
Clemson	5	–	13	.278	12	–	19	.387
Boston College	5	–	13	.278	14	–	19	.424
Wake Forest	2	–	16	.111	7	–	25	.219
Pittsburgh	2	–	16	.111	8	–	24	.250
† 2024 ACC tournament winner Rankings from AP poll

The 2023–24 Wake Forest Demon Deacons women's basketball team represented Wake Forest University during the 2023–24 NCAA Division I women's basketball season. The Demon Deacons were led by second-year head coach Megan Gebbia. They competed as members of the Atlantic Coast Conference and played their home games at the Lawrence Joel Veterans Memorial Coliseum.

The Demon Deacons started the season by winning only two of their first five games. Their luck did not improve, as they only won one of their next five games. They finished the non-conference portion of the schedule 4–8. They lost their first fourteen straight ACC regular season games before defeating Pittsburgh and Georgia Tech, for their only two ACC wins of the year. The Demon Deacons finished the season 7–25 overall and 2–16 in ACC play to finish in a tie for fourteenth place. As the fourteenth seed in the ACC tournament, they defeated eleventh seed Virginia in the first round before losing to sixth seed Florida State in the second round. They were not invited to the NCAA tournament or the WBIT. Their seven overall wins was their lowest win total since the 1999-2000 season.

== Previous season ==
The Demon Deacons finished the season 17–17 overall and 5–13 in ACC play to finish in a tie for eleventh place. As the twelfth seed in the ACC tournament, they defeated thirteenth seed Virginia in the first round and fifth seed Florida State in the second round before losing to fourth seed Louisville in the quarterfinals. They received an at-large bid to the WNIT. They defeated Morgan State in the first round before losing to Florida in the second round to end their season.

== Off-season ==
=== Departures ===
Departures
Name	Number	Pos.	Height	Year	Hometown	Reason for departure
Mack Maier	3	G	5'10"	Senior	Parker, Colorado	Graduated; transferred to High Point
Marta Morales	13	F	6'1"	Sophomore	Barcelona, Spain	Transferred to Providence
Niyah Becker	14	G	6'2"	Senior	Winnipeg, Canada	Graduated
Olivia Summiel	20	F	6'2"	Senior	Dayville, Connecticut	Graduated; transferred to Virginia Tech
Jewel Spear	24	G	5'10"	Junior	The Colony, Texas	Transferred to Tennessee

=== Recruiting class ===
College recruiting
Name	Hometown	School	Height	Weight	Commit date
Madisyn Jordan; G	Morrisville, North Carolina	Panther Creek	6 ft 1 in (1.85 m)	N/A	
Madisyn Jordan; G	Recruit ratings: ESPN: (93)				
Rylie Theuerkauf; G	Tenafly, New Jersey	Tenafly	5 ft 9 in (1.75 m)	N/A	
Rylie Theuerkauf; G	Recruit ratings: ESPN: (93)				
Makaela Quimby; G	Owings Mills, Maryland	McDonogh School	5 ft 9 in (1.75 m)	N/A	
Makaela Quimby; G	Recruit ratings: No ratings found				
Overall recruit ranking:
Note: In many cases, Scout, Rivals, 247Sports, On3, and ESPN may conflict in their listings of height and weight.; In these cases, the average was taken. ESPN grades are on a 100-point scale.; Sources:

== Roster ==
2023–24 Wake Forest Demon Deacons women's basketball team
Players
Coaches

Pos.	#	Name	Height	Year	Previous school	Hometown
G	0	Alyssa Andrews	6 ft 0 in (1.83 m)	Jr	Colgan	Woodbridge, VA
G	1	Makaela Quimby	5 ft 9 in (1.75 m)	Fr	McDonogh	Owings Mills, MD
G	2	Kaia Harrison	5 ft 7 in (1.7 m)	GS	Baldwin	Baldwin, NY
G	4	Aliah McWhorter	6 ft 1 in (1.85 m)	Sr	Sycamore	Cincinnati, OH
G	5	Malaya Cowles	6 ft 3 in (1.91 m)	RS So	Winston-Salem Christian	Wilkesboro, NC
G	11	Raegyn Conley	6 ft 0 in (1.83 m)	Jr	Baylor School	Chattanooga, TN
G	12	Kate Deeble	5 ft 8 in (1.73 m)	RS Fr	BA Centre of Excellence	Brisbane, Australia
G	14	Rylie Theuerkauf	5 ft 9 in (1.75 m)	Fr	Tenafly	Tenafly, NJ
G	21	Elise Williams	5 ft 9 in (1.75 m)	Jr	Wakefield	Raleigh, NC
G	22	Madisyn Jordan	6 ft 1 in (1.85 m)	Fr	Panther Creek	Morrisville, NC
F	25	DeMeara Hinds	6 ft 2 in (1.88 m)	Sr	Lithia Springs	Douglasville, GA
G	32	Alexandria Scruggs	5 ft 10 in (1.78 m)	GS	E. E. Smith	Fayetteville, NC

Head coach

- Megan Gebbia (Towson)

Assistant coach(es)

- Nikki Flores (Marist)
- Emily Stallings (East Stroudsburg)
- Millette Green (UMBC)

Legend

- (C) Team captain
- (S) Suspended
- (I) Ineligible
- (W) Walk-on
- Injured
- Current redshirt

Roster
Last update: November 26, 2023

== Schedule ==
Date time, TV	Rank^{#}	Opponent^{#}	Result	Record	Site (attendance) city, state
Non-conference regular season
November 6, 2023*; 5:00 p.m., ACCNX		Wofford	W 75–65	1–0	LJVM Coliseum (712); Winston-Salem, NC
November 11, 2023*; 1:00 p.m., ESPN+		at Davidson	L 52–57	1–1	John M. Belk Arena (933); Davidson, NC
November 15, 2023*; 6:00 p.m., ACCNX		North Carolina A&T	L 51–56	1–2	LJVM Coliseum (943); Winston-Salem, NC
November 18, 2023*; 9:30 p.m., BYUtv		vs. BYU; North Shore Showcase	L 44–67	1–3	Cannon Activities Center; Laie, HI
November 20, 2023*; 8:00 p.m., ESPN+		vs. Saint Louis; North Shore Showcase	W 94–66	2–3	Cannon Activities Center (76); Laie, HI
November 26, 2023*; 12:00 p.m., ACCN		Villanova	L 65–74	2–4	LJVM Coliseum (760); Winston-Salem, NC
November 30, 2023*; 9:00 p.m., ACCN		Texas A&M; ACC–SEC Challenge	L 57–81	2–5	LJVM Coliseum (763); Winston-Salem, NC
December 3, 2023*; 4:00 p.m., ESPN+		at James Madison	L 53–55	2–6	Atlantic Union Bank Center (2,446); Harrisonburg, VA
December 7, 2023*; 6:00 p.m., ACCNX		Charlotte	L 58–69	2–7	LJVM Coliseum (971); Winston-Salem, NC
December 10, 2023*; 2:00 p.m., ACCNX		Norfolk State	W 51–46	3–7	LJVM Coliseum (843); Winston-Salem, NC
December 17, 2023*; 2:00 p.m., FloHoops		at Georgetown	L 44–60	3–8	McDonough Gymnasium (783); Washington, D.C.
December 21, 2023*; 12:00 p.m., ACCNX		Marshall	W 66–59	4–8	LJVM Coliseum (941); Winston-Salem, NC
ACC regular season
December 31, 2023; 12:00 p.m., ACCN		at No. 22 Florida State	L 61–73	4–9 (0–1)	Donald L. Tucker Center (1,407); Tallahassee, FL
January 4, 2024; 6:00 p.m., ACCNX		No. 13 Virginia Tech	L 73–82	4–10 (0–2)	LJVM Coliseum (1,303); Winston-Salem, NC
January 7, 2024; 2:00 p.m., ACCNX		at Miami (FL)	L 47–77	4–11 (0–3)	Watsco Center (2,269); Coral Gables, FL
January 11, 2024; 11:30 p.m., ACCNX		Syracuse	L 56–77	4–12 (0–4)	LJVM Coliseum (6,374); Winston-Salem, NC
January 14, 2024; 2:00 p.m., ACCN		at No. 15 Louisville	L 62–83	4–13 (0–5)	KFC Yum! Center (8,901); Louisville, KY
January 18, 2024; 7:00 p.m., ACCNX		at Boston College	L 65–68	4–14 (0–6)	Conte Forum (803); Chestnut Hill, MA
January 21, 2024; 2:00 p.m., ACCNX		No. 19 Notre Dame	L 56–75	4–15 (0–7)	LJVM Coliseum (1,566); Winston-Salem, NC
January 28, 2024; 6:00 p.m., ACCN		at Clemson	L 59–73	4–16 (0–8)	Littlejohn Coliseum (990); Clemson, SC
February 1, 2024; 6:00 p.m., ACCNX		Miami (FL)	L 54–72	4–17 (0–9)	LJVM Coliseum (811); Winston-Salem, NC
February 4, 2024; 2:00 p.m., ACCN		Georgia Tech	L 55–58	4–18 (0–10)	LJVM Coliseum (1,197); Winston-Salem, NC
February 8, 2024; 7:00 p.m., ACCNX		at Duke	L 46–69	4–19 (0–11)	Cameron Indoor Stadium (1,640); Durham, NC
February 11, 2024; 2:00 p.m., ACCNX		Virginia	L 79–87	4–20 (0–12)	LJVM Coliseum (1,201); Winston-Salem, NC
February 15, 2024; 6:00 p.m., ACCNX		Florida State	L 63–71	4–21 (0–13)	LJVM Coliseum (736); Winston-Salem, NC
February 18, 2024; 6:00 p.m., ACCN		North Carolina	L 50–58	4–22 (0–14)	LJVM Coliseum (1,943); Winston-Salem, NC
February 22, 2024; 7:00 p.m., ACCNX		at Pittsburgh	W 65–50	5–22 (1–14)	Peterson Events Center (1,111); Pittsburgh, PA
February 25, 2024; 2:00 p.m., ACCNX		at Georgia Tech	W 71–66	6–22 (2–14)	McCamish Pavilion (1,823); Atlanta, GA
February 29, 2024; 6:00 p.m., ACCN		Clemson	L 64–68	6–23 (2–15)	LJVM Coliseum (910); Winston-Salem, NC
March 3, 2024; 2:00 p.m., ACCNX		at No. 12 NC State	L 57–75	6–24 (2–16)	Reynolds Coliseum (5,500); Raleigh, NC
ACC Women's Tournament
March 6, 2024; 6:30 p.m., ACCN	(14)	vs. (11) Virginia; First Round	W 58–55	7–24	Greensboro Coliseum (6,322); Greensboro, NC
March 7, 2024; 7:30 p.m., ACCN	(14)	vs. (6) Florida State; Second Round	L 53–70	7–25	Greensboro Coliseum (7,424); Greensboro, NC
*Non-conference game. ^{#}Rankings from AP Poll. (#) Tournament seedings in parentheses. All times are in Eastern.

== Rankings ==
+ Regular season polls	Poll	Pre- season	Week 2	Week 3	Week 4	Week 5	Week 6	Week 7	Week 8	Week 9	Week 10	Week 11	Week 12	Week 13	Week 14	Week 15	Week 16	Week 17	Week 18	Week 19	Week 20	Final
AP	NR	NR	NR	NR	NR	NR	NR	NR	NR	NR	NR	NR	NR	NR	NR	NR	NR	NR	NR	NR	NR	
Coaches	NR	NR	NR	NR	NR	NR	NR	NR	NR	NR	NR	NR	NR	NR	NR	NR	NR	NR	NR	NR	NR	

Note: The AP does not release a final poll.

Legend
	Increase in ranking
	Decrease in ranking
	Not ranked in previous week
(RV)	Received votes
(NR)	Not ranked

== See also ==
- 2023–24 Wake Forest Demon Deacons men's basketball team
