= 2023–24 Pittsburgh Panthers women's basketball team =

Intercollegiate basketball season

2023–24 Pittsburgh Panthers women's basketball
- Conference: Atlantic Coast Conference
- Record: 8–24 (2–16 ACC)
- Head coach: Tory Verdi (1st season)
- Assistant coaches: Ty Margenthaler; Candice Finley; LaKale Malone; Anthony Brammer
- Home arena: Petersen Events Center

2023–24 ACC women's basketball standings
	Conf.				Overall
Team	W		L	PCT	W		L	PCT
No. 18 Virginia Tech	14	–	4	.778	25	–	8	.758
No. 4 NC State	13	–	5	.722	31	–	7	.816
No. 20 Syracuse	13	–	5	.722	24	–	8	.750
No. 11 Notre Dame †	13	–	5	.722	28	–	7	.800
Louisville	12	–	6	.667	24	–	10	.706
Florida State	12	–	6	.667	23	–	11	.676
No. 17 Duke	11	–	7	.611	22	–	12	.647
North Carolina	11	–	7	.611	20	–	13	.606
Miami (FL)	8	–	10	.444	19	–	12	.613
Georgia Tech	7	–	11	.389	17	–	16	.515
Virginia	7	–	11	.389	16	–	16	.500
Clemson	5	–	13	.278	12	–	19	.387
Boston College	5	–	13	.278	14	–	19	.424
Wake Forest	2	–	16	.111	7	–	25	.219
Pittsburgh	2	–	16	.111	8	–	24	.250
† 2024 ACC tournament winner Rankings from AP poll

The 2023–24 Pittsburgh Panthers women's basketball team represented the University of Pittsburgh during the 2023–24 NCAA Division I women's basketball season. The Panthers were led by first-year head coach Tory Verdi, and played their home games at the Petersen Events Center as members of the Atlantic Coast Conference.

The Panthers started the season winning only one of their first five games. However, their fortunes improved over the remainder of their non-conference schedule, as they won five of their last eight non-conference games. They finished the non-conference portion of the season with a 6–7 record. They lost their first six conference games before winning against Virginia. The Panthers lost another six games before defeating Clemson for their second conference win of the season. The team lost their last four regular season games. They finished the season 8–24 overall and 2–16 in ACC play to finish in a tie for fourteenth place. As the fifteenth seed in the ACC tournament, they lost their first round matchup with Georgia Tech. They were not invited to the NCAA tournament or the WBIT.

== Previous season ==
The Panthers finished the season 10–20 overall and 3–15 in ACC play to finish in fifteenth place. As the fifteenth seed in the ACC tournament, they lost their first round matchup with Clemson. They were not invited to the NCAA tournament or the WNIT.

After the season, Head Coach Lance White was fired. Tory Verdi was hired as the new head coach on April 7, 2023.

== Off-season ==
=== Departures ===
Departures
Name	Number	Pos.	Height	Year	Hometown	Reason for departure
Sandrine Clesca	0	G	5'9"	Junior	Laval, Quebec	Transferred to Monmouth
Dayshanette Harris	1	G	5'7"	Graduate student	Youngstown, Ohio	Clemson
Taisha Exanor	3	G	6'0"	Junior	Châteauguay, Quebec	Transferred to Monmouth
Emy Hayford	4	G	5'8"	Senior	Maastricht, Netherlands	Graduated, Transferred to Fordham
Amber Brown	5	F	6'0"	Senior	Monroe, Louisiana	Graduated, Transferred to St. John's
Channise Lewis	10	G	5'8"	Graduate student	Miami, Florida	Graduated
Destiny Strother	13	G	5'9"	Senior	Flint, Michigan	Graduated, Transferred to Niagara
Cynthia Ezeja	14	F	6'2"	(redshirt) Junior	Athens, Greece	Transferred to Loyola Marymount
Maliyah Johnson	21	F	6'0"	Sophomore	Columbus, Ohio	Transferred to Houston
Avery Strickland	23	G	5'10"	Freshman	Knoxville, Tennessee	Transferred to Tennessee

=== Incoming transfers ===
Incoming transfers
Name	Number	Pos.	Height	Year	Hometown	Previous school
Raeven Boswell	5	G	5'11"	Sophomore	Austin, Texas	Georgia Tech
Bella Perkins	10	G	5'9"	Junior	Chantilly, Virginia	USC
Jala Jordan	14	F	6'2"	Graduate student	Philadelphia, Pennsylvania	Seton Hall
Rapuluchi Ayodele	15	F	6'1"	Senior	Athens, Greece	Eastern Florida State
Ioanna Chatzileonti	18	G	5'10"	Sophomore	Carnegie, Pennsylvania	Kansas

=== Recruiting class ===
College recruiting
Name	Hometown	School	Height	Weight	Commit date
Aaryn Battle; G	Sewell, New Jersey	Camden Catholic	5 ft 10 in (1.78 m)	N/A	
Aaryn Battle; G	Recruit ratings: No ratings found				
Jasmine Timmerson; G	Wexford, Pennsylvania	North Allegheny	5 ft 7 in (1.70 m)	N/A	
Jasmine Timmerson; G	Recruit ratings: No ratings found				
Lauren Rust; F	Victoria, Canada	The Webb School	6 ft 0 in (1.83 m)	N/A	
Lauren Rust; F	Recruit ratings: No ratings found				
Overall recruit ranking:
Note: In many cases, Scout, Rivals, 247Sports, On3, and ESPN may conflict in their listings of height and weight.; In these cases, the average was taken. ESPN grades are on a 100-point scale.; Sources:

== Roster ==
2023–24 Pittsburgh Panthers women's basketball team
Players
Coaches

Pos.	#	Name	Height	Year	Previous school	Hometown
F	0	Gabby Hutcherson	6 ft 2 in (1.88 m)	Sr	Westerville South; Ohio State	Westerville, OH
G	1	Aaryn Battle	5 ft 10 in (1.78 m)	Fr	Camden Catholic	Sewell, NJ
G	2	Liatu King	6 ft 0 in (1.83 m)	Sr	Bishop McNamara	Washington, D.C.
G	3	Jasmine Timmerson	5 ft 7 in (1.7 m)	Fr	North Allegheny	Wexford, PA
G	5	Raeven Boswell	5 ft 11 in (1.8 m)	So	Lake Travis; Georgia Tech	Austin, TX
G	10	Bella Perkins	5 ft 9 in (1.75 m)	Jr	Paul VI HS; USC	Chantilly, VA
G	11	Marley Washenitz	5 ft 7 in (1.7 m)	So	Fairmont	Fairmont, WV
F	13	Lauren Rust	6 ft 0 in (1.83 m)	Fr	The Webb School	Victoria, Canada
F	14	Jala Jordan	6 ft 2 in (1.88 m)	GS	IMG Academy; Seton Hall	Philadelphia, PA
F	15	Rapuluchi Ayodele	6 ft 1 in (1.85 m)	Jr	IES Manuela Malasana; Eastern Florida State	Móstoles, Spain
F	18	Ioanna Chatzileonti	6 ft 2 in (1.88 m)	Sr	1st High School of Voula; Kansas	Athens, Greece
G	20	Aislin Malcolm	5 ft 10 in (1.78 m)	So	Chartiers Valley	Carnegie, PA

Head coach

- Tory Verdi (Keene State)

Assistant coach(es)

- Ty Margenthaler (SIU Edwardsville)
- Candice Finley (Eastern Kentucky)
- LaKale Malone (Indiana)
- Anthony Brammer (Old Dominion)

Legend

- (C) Team captain
- (S) Suspended
- (I) Ineligible
- (W) Walk-on
- Injured
- Current redshirt

Roster
Last update: November 17, 2023

== Schedule ==
Date time, TV	Rank^{#}	Opponent^{#}	Result	Record	Site (attendance) city, state
Exhibition
October 30, 2023*; 7:00 p.m.		Point Park	W 117–49	–	Peterson Events Center; Pittsburgh, PA
Non-conference regular season
November 7, 2023*; 7:00 p.m., ACCNX		Yale	W 79–74	1–0	Peterson Events Center (1,199); Pittsburgh, PA
November 11, 2023*; 2:00 p.m., ACCNX		West Virginia; Backyard Brawl	L 62–71	1–1	Peterson Events Center (1,505); Pittsburgh, PA
November 15, 2023*; 4:00 p.m., ESPN+		at George Mason	L 52–60	1–2	EagleBank Arena (1,181); Fairfax, VA
November 18, 2023*; 2:00 p.m., ESPN+		Duquesne; City Game	L 55–56	1–3	Peterson Events Center (2,555); Pittsburgh, PA
November 21, 2023*; 11:00 a.m., ACCNX		Coppin State	L 56–61	1–4	Peterson Events Center (3,155); Pittsburgh, PA
November 24, 2023*; 3:30 p.m., FloHoops		vs. Northern Kentucky; Daytona Beach Classic	W 88–57	2–4	Ocean Center (200); Daytona Beach, FL
November 25, 2023*; 1:15 p.m., FloHoops		vs. Akron; Daytona Beach Classic	L 72–75	2–5	Ocean Center (200); Daytona Beach, FL
November 29, 2023*; 7:00 p.m., ACCNX		Saint Francis	W 87–62	3–5	Peterson Events Center (894); Pittsburgh, PA
December 3, 2023*; 6:00 p.m., ACCNX		Binghamton	W 73–62	4–5	Peterson Events Center (950); Pittsburgh, PA
December 10, 2023*; 2:00 p.m., ACCNX		Lehigh	W 94–82	5–5	Peterson Events Center (983); Pittsburgh, PA
December 19, 2023*; 12:00 p.m., Baller.tv		vs. Ball State; Sun Coast Tournament	L 62–73	5–6	Pasco–Hernando State College (108); Tampa, FL
December 20, 2023*; 12:00 p.m., Baller.tv		vs. Georgia; Sun Coast Tournament	L 59–65	5–7	Pasco–Hernando State College (133); Tampa, FL
December 28, 2023*; 7:00 p.m., ACCNX		Le Moyne	W 56–39	6–7	Peterson Events Center (1,097); Pittsburgh, PA
ACC regular season
December 31, 2023; 2:00 p.m., ACCNX		at No. 14 Virginia Tech	L 41–91	6–8 (0–1)	Cassell Coliseum (6,078); Blacksburg, VA
January 4, 2024; 6:00 p.m., ACCN		No. 16 Notre Dame	L 66–71	6–9 (0–2)	Peterson Events Center (1,285); Pittsburgh, PA
January 7, 2024; 2:00 p.m., ACCNX		Georgia Tech	L 58–68	6–10 (0–3)	Peterson Events Center (1,653); Pittsburgh, PA
January 11, 2024; 6:00 p.m., ACCN		No. 15 Louisville	L 44–74	6–11 (0–4)	Peterson Events Center (868); Pittsburgh, PA
January 14, 2024; 12:00 p.m., ACCN		at Boston College	L 71–84 ^{OT}	6–12 (0–5)	Conte Forum (1,126); Chestnut Hill, MA
January 21, 2024; 2:00 p.m., ACCNX		Syracuse	L 59–72	6–13 (0–6)	Peterson Events Center (1,555); Pittsburgh, PA
January 25, 2024; 7:00 p.m., ACCNX		at Virginia	W 56–52	7–13 (1–6)	John Paul Jones Arena (3,817); Charlottesville, VA
January 28, 2024; 2:00 p.m., ACCNX		at No. 18 Louisville	L 58–77	7–14 (1–7)	KFC Yum! Center (9,452); Louisville, KY
February 1, 2024; 7:00 p.m., ACCNX		Duke	L 38–69	7–15 (1–8)	Peterson Events Center (1,199); Pittsburgh, PA
February 4, 2024; 2:00 p.m., ACCN		at No. 14 Notre Dame	L 53–78	7–16 (1–9)	Purcell Pavilion (7,170); Notre Dame, IN
February 8, 2024; 7:00 p.m., ACCNX		Florida State	L 60–76	7–17 (1–10)	Peterson Events Center (1,124); Pittsburgh, PA
February 11, 2024; 12:00 p.m., ACCNX		No. 3 NC State	L 47–83	7–18 (1–11)	Peterson Events Center (2,001); Pittsburgh, PA
February 15, 2024; 6:00 p.m., ACCNX		at North Carolina	L 62–75	7–19 (1–12)	Carmichael Arena (2,508); Chapel Hill, NC
February 18, 2024; 12:00 p.m., ACCN		at Clemson	W 72–57	8–19 (2–12)	Littlejohn Coliseum (880); Clemson, SC
February 22, 2024; 7:00 p.m., ACCNX		Wake Forest	L 50–65	8–20 (2–13)	Peterson Events Center (1,111); Pittsburgh, PA
February 25, 2024; 2:00 p.m., ACCNX		at No. 17 Syracuse	L 53–63	8–21 (2–14)	JMA Wireless Dome (4,178); Syracuse, NY
February 29, 2024; 6:00 p.m., ACCNX		at Miami (FL)	L 44–62	8–22 (2–15)	Peterson Events Center (2,325); Pittsburgh, PA
March 3, 2024; 12:00 p.m., ACCN		Boston College	L 55–84	8–23 (2–16)	Peterson Events Center (1,744); Pittsburgh, PA
ACC Women's tournament
March 6, 2024; 3:30 p.m., ACCN	(15)	vs. (10) Georgia Tech; First Round	L 60–73	8–24	Greensboro Coliseum (6,322); Greensboro, NC
*Non-conference game. ^{#}Rankings from AP Poll. (#) Tournament seedings in parentheses. All times are in Eastern.

== Rankings ==
+ Regular season polls	Poll	Pre- season	Week 2	Week 3	Week 4	Week 5	Week 6	Week 7	Week 8	Week 9	Week 10	Week 11	Week 12	Week 13	Week 14	Week 15	Week 16	Week 17	Week 18	Week 19	Week 20	Final
AP	NR	NR	NR	NR	NR	NR	NR	NR	NR	NR	NR	NR	NR	NR	NR	NR	NR	NR	NR	NR	NR	
Coaches	NR	NR	NR	NR	NR	NR	NR	NR	NR	NR	NR	NR	NR	NR	NR	NR	NR	NR	NR	NR	NR	

Note: The AP does not release a final poll.

Legend
	Increase in ranking
	Decrease in ranking
	Not ranked in previous week
(RV)	Received votes
(NR)	Not ranked
