= 2023–24 Syracuse Orange women's basketball team =

Intercollegiate basketball season

2023–24 Syracuse Orange women's basketball

NCAA tournament, Second Round
- Conference: Atlantic Coast Conference

Ranking
- Coaches: No. 23
- AP: No. 20
- Record: 24–8 (13–5 ACC)
- Head coach: Felisha Legette-Jack (2nd season)
- Assistant coaches: Khyreed Carter; Sue Ludwig; Kristen Sharkey
- Home arena: JMA Wireless Dome

2023–24 ACC women's basketball standings
	Conf.				Overall
Team	W		L	PCT	W		L	PCT
No. 18 Virginia Tech	14	–	4	.778	25	–	8	.758
No. 4 NC State	13	–	5	.722	31	–	7	.816
No. 20 Syracuse	13	–	5	.722	24	–	8	.750
No. 11 Notre Dame †	13	–	5	.722	28	–	7	.800
Louisville	12	–	6	.667	24	–	10	.706
Florida State	12	–	6	.667	23	–	11	.676
No. 17 Duke	11	–	7	.611	22	–	12	.647
North Carolina	11	–	7	.611	20	–	13	.606
Miami (FL)	8	–	10	.444	19	–	12	.613
Georgia Tech	7	–	11	.389	17	–	16	.515
Virginia	7	–	11	.389	16	–	16	.500
Clemson	5	–	13	.278	12	–	19	.387
Boston College	5	–	13	.278	14	–	19	.424
Wake Forest	2	–	16	.111	7	–	25	.219
Pittsburgh	2	–	16	.111	8	–	24	.250
† 2024 ACC tournament winner Rankings from AP poll

The 2023–24 Syracuse Orange women's basketball team represented Syracuse University during the 2023–24 NCAA Division I women's basketball season. The Orange were led by second-year head coach Felisha Legette-Jack. The Orange were tenth year members of the Atlantic Coast Conference and played their home games at the JMA Wireless Dome in Syracuse, New York.

The Orange started the season with three straight wins before losing to number 20 Maryland. That would be their final loss of the non-conference regular season as they won the South Point Shootout and defeated Alabama in their ACC–SEC Challenge game. They finished the non-conference regular season 10–1. They began the ACC regular season with a win over number 13 Notre Dame and became ranked for the first time during the season at number 25. They lost their first game after becoming ranked to North Carolina. They fell out of the rankings after that, but then they won seven straight games to return to the rankings. The seven game winning streak included wins over number 15 Florida State and a second win over then number 15 Notre Dame. They then lost two straight games against number 19 Virginia Tech and number 16 Louisville. The Orange then won five straight games including avenging their earlier loss against Louisville. They finished the season only winning one of their last three games, with the final game of the season being an overtime loss to number 12 NC State.

The Orange finished the season 24–8 overall and 13–5 in ACC play to finish in a three way tie for second place. As the third seed in the ACC tournament, they earned a bye into the Quarterfinals where they were upset by sixth seed Florida State. They received an at-large invitation to the NCAA Tournament, marking their first appearance since 2021. As the sixth seed in the Portland 3 they defeated eleventh seed Arizona in the First Round before losing to third seed Connecticut in the Second Round to end their season.

== Previous season ==
Prior to the season beginning Felisha Legette-Jack was announced as the head coach at Syracuse. She took over from interim head coach Von Read.

The Orange finished the season 20–13 overall and 9–9 in ACC play to finish in a tie for eighth place. As the ninth seed in the ACC tournament, the received a bye to the Second Round, where they lost to NC State. They received an at-large bid to the WNIT. The Orange defeated Kent State in the First Round and Seton Hall in the Second Round before losing to Columbia in the Super 16 to end their season.

== Off-season ==
=== Departures ===
Departures
Name	Number	Pos.	Height	Year	Hometown	Reason for departure
Olivia Owens	00	F	6'4"	Graduate Student	Albany, New York	Graduated
Nyah Wilson	3	G	5'8"	Sophomore	Dallas, Texas	Transferred to New Mexico
Teisha Hyman	4	G	5'8"	(redshirt) Junior	White Plains, New York	Transferred to Rhode Island
Ava Irvin	10	G	5'8"	Junior	Atlanta, Georgia	Graduated
Asia Strong	15	F	6'2"	Graduate Student	South Bend, Indiana	Graduated
Dariauna Lewis	24	F	6'1"	Graduate Student	Omaha, Nebraska	Graduated

=== Incoming transfers ===
Incoming transfers
Name	Number	Pos.	Height	Year	Hometown	Previous school
Dominique Camp	24	G	5'8"	Graduate Student	Dayton, Ohio	Akron
Izabel Varejão	34	C	6'4"	Graduate Student	Vitória, Brazil	Michigan

=== Recruiting class ===
College recruiting
Name	Hometown	School	Height	Weight	Commit date
Alyssa Latham; F	Glenwood, Illinois	Homewood-Flossmoor	6 ft 1 in (1.85 m)	N/A	
Alyssa Latham; F	Recruit ratings: ESPN: (93)				
Sophie Burrows; G	Victoria, Australia	Viewbank College	6 ft 2 in (1.88 m)	N/A	
Sophie Burrows; G	Recruit ratings: No ratings found				
Marilena Triantafylli; C	Athens, Greece	2nd GEL of Agia Paraskevi	6 ft 5 in (1.96 m)	N/A	
Marilena Triantafylli; C	Recruit ratings: No ratings found				
Overall recruit ranking:
Note: In many cases, Scout, Rivals, 247Sports, On3, and ESPN may conflict in their listings of height and weight.; In these cases, the average was taken. ESPN grades are on a 100-point scale.; Sources:

== Roster ==
2023–24 Syracuse Orange women's basketball team
Players
Coaches

Pos.	#	Name	Height	Year	Previous school	Hometown
G	1	Kennedi Perkins	5 ft 6 in (1.68 m)	So	Bolingbrook	Bolingbrook, IL
G	2	Dyaisha Fair	5 ft 5 in (1.65 m)	GS	Edison Tech; Buffalo	Rochester, NY
G	4	Sophie Burrows	6 ft 2 in (1.88 m)	Fr	Viewbank College	Victoria, Australia
G	5	Georgia Woolley	6 ft 0 in (1.83 m)	Jr	St Paul's School; Buffalo	Brisbane, Australia
G	11	Lexi McNabb	5 ft 7 in (1.7 m)	So	Lincoln Prep	Chandler, AZ
G	12	Cheyenne McEvans	5 ft 9 in (1.75 m)	Sr	Southfield A&T; Buffalo	Southfield, MI
C	15	Marilena Triantafylli	6 ft 5 in (1.96 m)	Fr	2nd GEL of Agia Paraskevi	Athens, Greece
F	22	Kyra Wood	6 ft 3 in (1.91 m)	Jr	City Honors; Temple	Buffalo, NY
F	23	Alyssa Latham	6 ft 2 in (1.88 m)	Fr	Homewood-Flossmoor	Glenwood, IL
G	24	Dominique Camp	5 ft 8 in (1.73 m)	GS	Lakota West; Akron	Dayton, OH
G	25	Alaina Rice	5 ft 8 in (1.73 m)	GS	IMG Academy; Auburn	Rockledge, FL
C	34	Izabel Varejão	6 ft 4 in (1.93 m)	GS	Neuse Christian Academy; Michigan	Vitória, Brazil

Head coach

- Felisha Legette-Jack (Syracuse)

Assistant coach(es)

- Khyreed Carter (Michigan State)
- Sue Ludwig (Syracuse)
- Kristen Sharkey (Buffalo)

Legend

- (C) Team captain
- (S) Suspended
- (I) Ineligible
- (W) Walk-on
- Injured
- Current redshirt

Roster
Last update: November 20, 2023

== Schedule ==
Date time, TV	Rank^{#}	Opponent^{#}	Result	Record	Site (attendance) city, state
Exhibition
October 31, 2023*; 5:00 p.m., ACCNX		Saint Rose	W 77–73	–	JMA Wireless Dome (187); Syracuse, NY
Non-conference regular season
November 7, 2023*; 7:00 p.m., ACCNX		Lafayette	W 75–41	1–0	JMA Wireless Dome (1,162); Syracuse, NY
November 10, 2023*; 7:00 p.m., ACCNX		Central Connecticut	W 101–53	2–0	JMA Wireless Dome (1,494); Syracuse, NY
November 15, 2023*; 7:00 p.m., ACCNX		Coppin State	W 80–47	3–0	JMA Wireless Dome (1,085); Syracuse, NY
November 19, 2023*; 12:00 p.m., BTN		at No. 20 Maryland	L 81–83	3–1	Xfinity Center (7,090); College Park, MD
November 24, 2023*; 2:00 p.m., FloHoops		vs. Northern Iowa; South Point Shootout	W 71–54	4–1	South Point Casino; Las Vegas, NV
November 25, 2023*; 2:00 p.m., FloHoops		vs. Iowa State; South Point Shootout	W 81–69	5–1	South Point Casino; Las Vegas, NV
November 30, 2023*; 7:00 p.m., ACCN		Alabama; ACC–SEC Challenge	W 79–73	6–1	JMA Wireless Dome (1,819); Syracuse, NY
December 4, 2023*; 7:00 p.m., ACCNX		Northeastern	W 79–57	7–1	JMA Wireless Dome (1,077); Syracuse, NY
December 9, 2023*; 3:00 p.m., ESPN+		at Ohio	W 82–62	8–1	Convocation Center; Athens, OH
December 18, 2023*; 7:00 p.m., ACCNX		Cornell	W 78–71	9–1	JMA Wireless Dome (1,772); Syracuse, NY
December 21, 2023*; 10:30 a.m., ACCNX		Saint Francis	W 85–43	10–1	JMA Wireless Dome (9,109); Syracuse, NY
ACC regular season
December 31, 2023; 2:00 p.m., ACCN		No. 13 Notre Dame	W 86–81	11–1 (1–0)	JMA Wireless Dome (2,755); Syracuse, NY
January 4, 2024; 6:00 p.m., ACCNX	No. 25	at North Carolina	L 51–75	11–2 (1–1)	Carmichael Arena (2,006); Chapel Hill, NC
January 7, 2024; 6:00 p.m., ACCN	No. 25	Boston College	W 71–64	12–2 (2–1)	JMA Wireless Dome (1,811); Syracuse, NY
January 11, 2024; 11:30 a.m., ACCNX		at Wake Forest	W 77–56	13–2 (3–1)	LJVM Coliseum (6,374); Winston-Salem, NC
January 14, 2024; 2:00 p.m., ACCNX		Clemson	W 83–82	14–2 (4–1)	JMA Wireless Dome (3,044); Syracuse, NY
January 18, 2024; 7:00 p.m., ACCNX		No. 15 Florida State	W 79–73	15–2 (5–1)	JMA Wireless Dome (2,533); Syracuse, NY
January 21, 2024; 2:00 p.m., ACCNX		at Pittsburgh	W 72–59	16–2 (6–1)	Peterson Events Center (1,555); Pittsburgh, PA
January 25, 2024; 7:00 p.m., ACCNX	No. 22	at No. 15 Notre Dame	W 79–65	17–2 (7–1)	Purcell Pavilion (5,512); Notre Dame, IN
January 28, 2024; 12:00 p.m., ACCNX	No. 22	No. 19 Virginia Tech	L 62–75	17–3 (7–2)	JMA Wireless Dome (6,003); Syracuse, NY
February 1, 2024; 7:00 p.m., ACCNX	No. 21	at No. 16 Louisville	L 69–81	17–4 (7–3)	KFC Yum! Center (8,254); Louisville, KY
February 4, 2024; 12:00 p.m., ACCN	No. 21	at Boston College	W 75–63	18–4 (8–3)	Conte Forum (1,836); Chestnut Hill, MA
February 8, 2024; 7:00 p.m., ACCNX	No. 23	Georgia Tech	W 62–59	19–4 (9–3)	JMA Wireless Dome (2,603); Syracuse, NY
February 11, 2024; 12:00 p.m., The CW	No. 23	No. 15 Louisville	W 73–72	20–4 (10–3)	JMA Wireless Dome (3,912); Syracuse, NY
February 15, 2024; 6:00 p.m., ACCNX	No. 19	at Miami (FL)	W 71–60	21–4 (11–3)	Watsco Center (2,310); Coral Gables, FL
February 18, 2024; 2:00 p.m., ACCN	No. 19	at Virginia	W 85–79	22–4 (12–3)	John Paul Jones Arena (6,619); Charlottesville, VA
February 22, 2024; 7:00 p.m., ACCNX	No. 17	Duke	L 45–58	22–5 (12–4)	JMA Wireless Dome (3,480); Syracuse, NY
February 25, 2024; 2:00 p.m., ACCNX	No. 17	Pittsburgh	W 63–53	23–5 (13–4)	JMA Wireless Dome (4,178); Syracuse, NY
February 29, 2024; 7:00 p.m., ACCNX	No. 19	at No. 12 NC State	L 71–75 ^{OT}	23–6 (13–5)	Reynolds Coliseum (5,500); Raleigh, NC
ACC tournament
March 8, 2024; 7:30 p.m., ACCN	(3) No. 20	vs. (6) Florida State; Quarterfinals	L 65–78	23–7	Greensboro Coliseum (7,720); Greensboro, NC
NCAA tournament
March 23, 2024*; 3:30 p.m., ESPN2	(6 P3) No. 22	vs. (11 P3) Arizona; First Round	W 74–69	24–7	Harry A. Gampel Pavilion (10,299); Storrs, CT
March 25, 2024*; 6:00 p.m., ESPN	(6 P3) No. 22	at (3 P3) No. 10 UConn; Second Round/Rivalry	L 64–72	24–8	Harry A. Gampel Pavilion (10,299); Storrs, CT
*Non-conference game. ^{#}Rankings from AP Poll. (#) Tournament seedings in parentheses. P3=Portland 3. All times are in Eastern.

== Rankings ==
+ Regular season polls	Poll	Pre- Season	Week 2	Week 3	Week 4	Week 5	Week 6	Week 7	Week 8	Week 9	Week 10	Week 11	Week 12	Week 13	Week 14	Week 15	Week 16	Week 17	Week 18	Week 19	Week 20	Final
AP	NR	NR	NR	NR	NR	NR	RV	RV	25	RV	RV	22	21	23	19	17	19	20	22	22	20	
Coaches	NR	NR	NR	RV	RV	RV	RV	RV	RV	RV	25	22	23	23	20	17	19	20	23	23	23	

Legend
	Increase in ranking
	Decrease in ranking
	Not ranked in previous week
(RV)	Received Votes
(NR)	Not Ranked

== 2024 WNBA draft ==
Player	Team	Round	Pick #	Position
(United States) Dyaisha Fair	Las Vegas Aces	2	16	PG
