= 2023–24 Miami Hurricanes women's basketball team =

Intercollegiate basketball season

2023–24 Miami Hurricanes women's basketball
- Conference: Atlantic Coast Conference
- Record: 19–12 (8–10 ACC)
- Head coach: Katie Meier (19th season)
- Assistant coaches: Fitzroy Anthony; Shenise Johnson; Josh Petersen; Bob Dunn
- Home arena: Watsco Center

2023–24 ACC women's basketball standings
	Conf.				Overall
Team	W		L	PCT	W		L	PCT
No. 18 Virginia Tech	14	–	4	.778	25	–	8	.758
No. 4 NC State	13	–	5	.722	31	–	7	.816
No. 20 Syracuse	13	–	5	.722	24	–	8	.750
No. 11 Notre Dame †	13	–	5	.722	28	–	7	.800
Louisville	12	–	6	.667	24	–	10	.706
Florida State	12	–	6	.667	23	–	11	.676
No. 17 Duke	11	–	7	.611	22	–	12	.647
North Carolina	11	–	7	.611	20	–	13	.606
Miami (FL)	8	–	10	.444	19	–	12	.613
Georgia Tech	7	–	11	.389	17	–	16	.515
Virginia	7	–	11	.389	16	–	16	.500
Clemson	5	–	13	.278	12	–	19	.387
Boston College	5	–	13	.278	14	–	19	.424
Wake Forest	2	–	16	.111	7	–	25	.219
Pittsburgh	2	–	16	.111	8	–	24	.250
† 2024 ACC tournament winner Rankings from AP poll

The 2023–24 Miami Hurricanes women's basketball team represented the University of Miami during the 2023–24 NCAA Division I women's basketball season. The Hurricanes were led by nineteenth-year head coach Katie Meier and played their home games at the Watsco Center as members of the Atlantic Coast Conference.

The Hurricanes started the season with eight straight wins. During the win streak, they won their early season tournament, the Miami Thanksgiving Tournament, and defeated a ranked Mississippi State team on the road in the ACC–SEC Challenge. Miami was ranked 24th for their match up with number 10 Baylor, but they lost 57–75. That would be Miami's only loss of their non-conference schedule as they finished 10–1. The team could not carry their momentum from non-conference play into the ACC schedule as they lost four of their first five games. They followed that with a win over number 4 NC State. They would go on from there to win four of their next six games, including an overtime victory over Clemson. The Hurricanes then went on a three game losing streak before winning two of their last three games. Their one loss in that stretch was in overtime to Georgia Tech.

The Hurricanes finished the season 19–12 overall and 8–10 in ACC play to finish in ninth place. As the ninth seed in the ACC tournament, they defeated eighth seed North Carolina in the Second Round before losing to first seeded Virginia Tech in the Quarterfinals. On Selection Sunday, the Hurricanes were not picked to be a part of the field for the 2024 NCAA Tournament, and were left out by the selection committee. The team declined an invite to the inaugural WBIT, ending their season.

On March 22, 2024, Meier announced her retirement from coaching.

== Previous season ==
They finished the season 22–13 overall and 11–7 in ACC play to finish in a tie for sixth place. As the sixth seed in the ACC tournament, they defeated eleventh seed Boston College in the Second Round before losing to third seeded Virginia Tech in the Quarterfinals. They received an at-large bid to the NCAA tournament where they were the ninth seed in the Greenville 2 Regional. They defeated eighth seed Oklahoma State in the First Round, first seed Indiana in the Second Round, and fourth seed Villanova in the Sweet Sixteen before losing to eventual champions third seed LSU in the Elite Eight to end their season. The Elite Eight appearance was the first in program history.

== Off-season ==
=== Departures ===
Departures
Name	Number	Pos.	Height	Year	Hometown	Reason for departure
Kenza Salgues	0	G	5'9"	Senior	Montpellier, France	Graduated, transferred to Florida
Moulayna Sidi Baba	1	G/F	6'1"	Senior	Stockholm, Sweden	Graduated, transferred to UC Irvine
Destiny Harden	3	F	6'0"	Graduate Student	Chicago, Illinois	Graduated, drafted 27th overall in the 2023 WNBA draft
Karla Erjavec	5	G	5'10"	Graduate Student	Zagreb, Croatia	Graduated
Haley Cavinder	14	G	5'6"	Senior	Gilbert, Arizona	Graduated signed to WWE
Hanna Cavinder	15	G	5'6"	Senior	Gilbert, Arizona	Graduated signed to WWE
Lola Pendande	21	F	6'4"	Senior	Almeria, Spain	Graduated
Chiso Okafor	22	F	6'1"	Sophomore	Mataró, Spain	—

=== Incoming transfers ===
Incoming transfers
Name	Number	Pos.	Height	Year	Hometown	Previous school
Lemyah Hylton	1	G	5'11"	Sophomore	London, Ontario	Arizona
Jaida Patrick	5	G	5'10"	Graduate Student	West Haverstraw, New York	Columbia
Ally Stedman	21	G	5'9"	Junior	Phoenix, Arizona	Pepperdine
Shayeann Day-Wilson	30	G	5'6"	Sophomore	Toronto, Canada	Duke

=== Recruiting class ===
College recruiting information
Name	Hometown	School	Height	Weight	Commit date
Aurora Almón; F	Santo Domingo, Dominican Republic	The Webb Schools	6 ft 4 in (1.93 m)	N/A	
Aurora Almón; F	Recruit ratings: No ratings found				
Overall recruit ranking:
Note: In many cases, Scout, Rivals, 247Sports, On3, and ESPN may conflict in their listings of height and weight.; In these cases, the average was taken. ESPN grades are on a 100-point scale.; Sources:

== Roster ==
2023–24 Miami Hurricanes women's basketball team
Players
Coaches

Pos.	#	Name	Height	Year	Previous school	Hometown
F	0	Aurora Almón	6 ft 4 in (1.93 m)	Fr	The Webb Schools	Santo Domingo, Dominican Republic
G	1	Lemyah Hylton	5 ft 11 in (1.8 m)	So	Southwest Academy Girls Prep; Arizona	London, ON
G	4	Jasmyne Roberts	5 ft 10 in (1.78 m)	Jr	Bishop Kenny	Jacksonville, FL
G	5	Jaida Patrick	5 ft 10 in (1.78 m)	GS	Saddle River Day School; Duke, Columbia	West Haverstraw, NY
G	12	Ja'Leah Williams	5 ft 9 in (1.75 m)	Jr	Blanche Ely	Pompano Beach, FL
G	13	Lashae Dwyer	5 ft 8 in (1.73 m)	Jr	Webb School	Toronto, Canada
G	21	Ally Stedman	5 ft 9 in (1.75 m)	Jr	Pinnacle; Pepperdine	Phoenix, AZ
G	30	Shayeann Day-Wilson	5 ft 6 in (1.68 m)	So	Crestwood Prep; Duke	Toronto, Canada
F	32	Lazaria Spearman	6 ft 4 in (1.93 m)	So	Dacula	Dacula, GA
F	35	Latasha Lattimore	6 ft 4 in (1.93 m)	Jr	Royal Crown Academic School; Texas	Toronto, Canada
F	44	Kyla Oldcare	6 ft 6 in (1.98 m)	So	William Mason	Mason, OH

Head coach

- Katie Meier (Duke)

Assistant coach(es)

- Fitzroy Anthony (Palm Beach Atlantic)
- Shenise Johnson (Miami (FL))
- Josh Petersen (Florida State)
- Bob Dunn (Dayton)

Legend

- (C) Team captain
- (S) Suspended
- (I) Ineligible
- (W) Walk-on
- Injured
- Current redshirt

Roster
Last update: November 1, 2023

== Schedule ==
Date time, TV	Rank^{#}	Opponent^{#}	Result	Record	Site (attendance) city, state
Non-conference regular season
November 9, 2023*; 11:00 p.m., ACCNX		Jacksonville	W 81–53	1–0	Watsco Center (3,851); Coral Gables, FL
November 12, 2023*; 2:00 p.m., ACCNX		Fordham	W 78–39	2–0	Watsco Center (2,515); Coral Gables, FL
November 17, 2023*; 5:00 p.m., ACCNX		Southern	W 78–39	3–0	Watsco Center (2,188); Coral Gables, FL
November 24, 2023*; 4:00 p.m., ACCNX		Colgate; Miami Thanksgiving Tournament	W 67–49	4–0	Watsco Center (2,169); Coral Gables, FL
November 26, 2023*; 1:30 p.m., ACCNX		ETSU; Miami Thanksgiving Tournament	W 68–44	5–0	Watsco Center (2,038); Coral Gables, FL
November 29, 2023*; 7:15 p.m., SECN		at No. 21 Mississippi State; ACC–SEC Challenge	W 74–68	6–0	Humphrey Coliseum (5,135); Mississippi State, MS
December 3, 2023*; 12:00 p.m., ACCN		NJIT	W 87–43	7–0	Watsco Center (2,629); Coral Gables, FL
December 8, 2023*; 7:00 p.m., ACCN		DePaul	W 75–70	8–0	Watsco Center (2,172); Coral Gables, FL
December 16, 2023*; 5:00 p.m., ESPN+	No. 24	vs. No. 10 Baylor; Hall of Fame Series	L 57–75	8–1	Frost Bank Center (2,279); San Antonio, TX
December 20, 2023*; 7:00 p.m., ACCNX		Jackson State	W 59–52	9–1	Watsco Center (2,117); Coral Gables, FL
December 28, 2023*; 1:00 p.m., ACCNX		Alabama State	W 81–36	10–1	Watsco Center (2,227); Coral Gables, FL
ACC regular season
December 31, 2023; 4:00 p.m., ACCN		No. 19 Louisville	L 72–77	10–2 (0–1)	Watsco Center (2,120); Coral Gables, FL
January 4, 2024; 7:00 p.m., ACCNX		at Boston College	L 64–70	10–3 (0–2)	Conte Forum (819); Chestnut Hill, MA
January 7, 2024; 2:00 p.m., ACCNX		Wake Forest	W 77–47	11–3 (1–2)	Watsco Center (2,269); Coral Gables, FL
January 11, 2024; 8:00 p.m., ACCN		at No. 11 Virginia Tech	L 52–76	11–4 (1–3)	Cassell Coliseum (4,672); Blacksburg, VA
January 14, 2024; 12:00 p.m., The CW		at No. 18 Notre Dame	L 59–70	11–5 (1–4)	Purcell Pavilion (5,905); Notre Dame, IN
January 18, 2024; 6:00 p.m., ACCNX		No. 4 NC State	W 73–59	12–5 (2–4)	Watsco Center (2,366); Coral Gables, FL
January 25, 2024; 8:00 p.m., ACCN		at No. 20 North Carolina	L 61–66	12–6 (2–5)	Carmichael Arena (2,530); Chapel Hill, NC
January 28, 2024; 2:00 p.m., ACCN		Duke	W 64–58	13–6 (3–5)	Watsco Center (3,112); Coral Gables, FL
February 1, 2024; 6:00 p.m., ACCNX		at Wake Forest	W 72–54	14–6 (4–5)	LJVM Coliseum (811); Winston-Salem, NC
February 4, 2024; 11:00 a.m., The CW		at Florida State; Rivalry	L 68–75	14–7 (4–6)	Donald L. Tucker Center (2,277); Tallahassee, FL
February 8, 2024; 6:00 p.m., ACCNX		Clemson	W 75–72 ^{OT}	15–7 (5–6)	Watsco Center (2,391); Coral Gables, FL
February 11, 2024; 2:00 p.m., ACCNX		Georgia Tech	W 62–60	16–7 (6–6)	McCamish Pavilion (2,214); Atlanta, GA
February 15, 2024; 6:00 p.m., ACCNX		No. 19 Syracuse	L 60–71	16–8 (6–7)	Watsco Center (2,310); Coral Gables, FL
February 18, 2024; 4:00 p.m., ACCN		Florida State; Rivalry	L 68–74	16–9 (6–8)	Watsco Center (3,584); Coral Gables, FL
February 22, 2024; 7:00 p.m., ACCNX		at Virginia	L 60–77	16–10 (6–9)	John Paul Jones Arena (3,968); Charlottesville, VA
February 25, 2024; 2:00 p.m., ACCNX		at Clemson	W 56–50	17–10 (7–9)	Littlejohn Coliseum (1,111); Clemson, SC
February 29, 2024; 6:00 p.m., ACCNX		Pittsburgh	W 62–44	18–10 (8–9)	Watsco Center (2,325); Coral Gables, FL
March 3, 2024; 2:00 p.m., ACCN		Georgia Tech	L 66–71 ^{OT}	18–11 (8–10)	Watsco Center (2,739); Coral Gables, FL
ACC Women's Tournament
March 7, 2024; 1:30 p.m., ACCN	(9)	vs. (8) North Carolina; Second round	W 60–59	19–11	Greensboro Coliseum (10,823); Greensboro, NC
March 8, 2024; 1:30 p.m., ACCN	(9)	vs. (1) No. 11 Virginia Tech; Quarterfinals	L 47–55	19–12	Greensboro Coliseum (15,202); Greensboro, NC
*Non-conference game. ^{#}Rankings from AP Poll. (#) Tournament seedings in parentheses. All times are in Eastern.

== Rankings ==
+ Regular season polls	Poll	Pre- Season	Week 2	Week 3	Week 4	Week 5	Week 6	Week 7	Week 8	Week 9	Week 10	Week 11	Week 12	Week 13	Week 14	Week 15	Week 16	Week 17	Week 18	Week 19	Week 20	Final
AP	RV	RV	RV	RV	RV	24	RV	RV	RV	RV	NR	RV	NR	NR	NR	NR	NR	NR	NR	NR	NR	
Coaches	25т	RV	RV	RV	RV	23	24	23	RV	RV	RV	RV	RV	NR	NR	NR	NR	NR	NR	NR	NR	

Legend
	Increase in ranking
	Decrease in ranking
	Not ranked previous week
(RV)	Received Votes
