= Ta'Niya Latson =

American basketball player (born 2003)

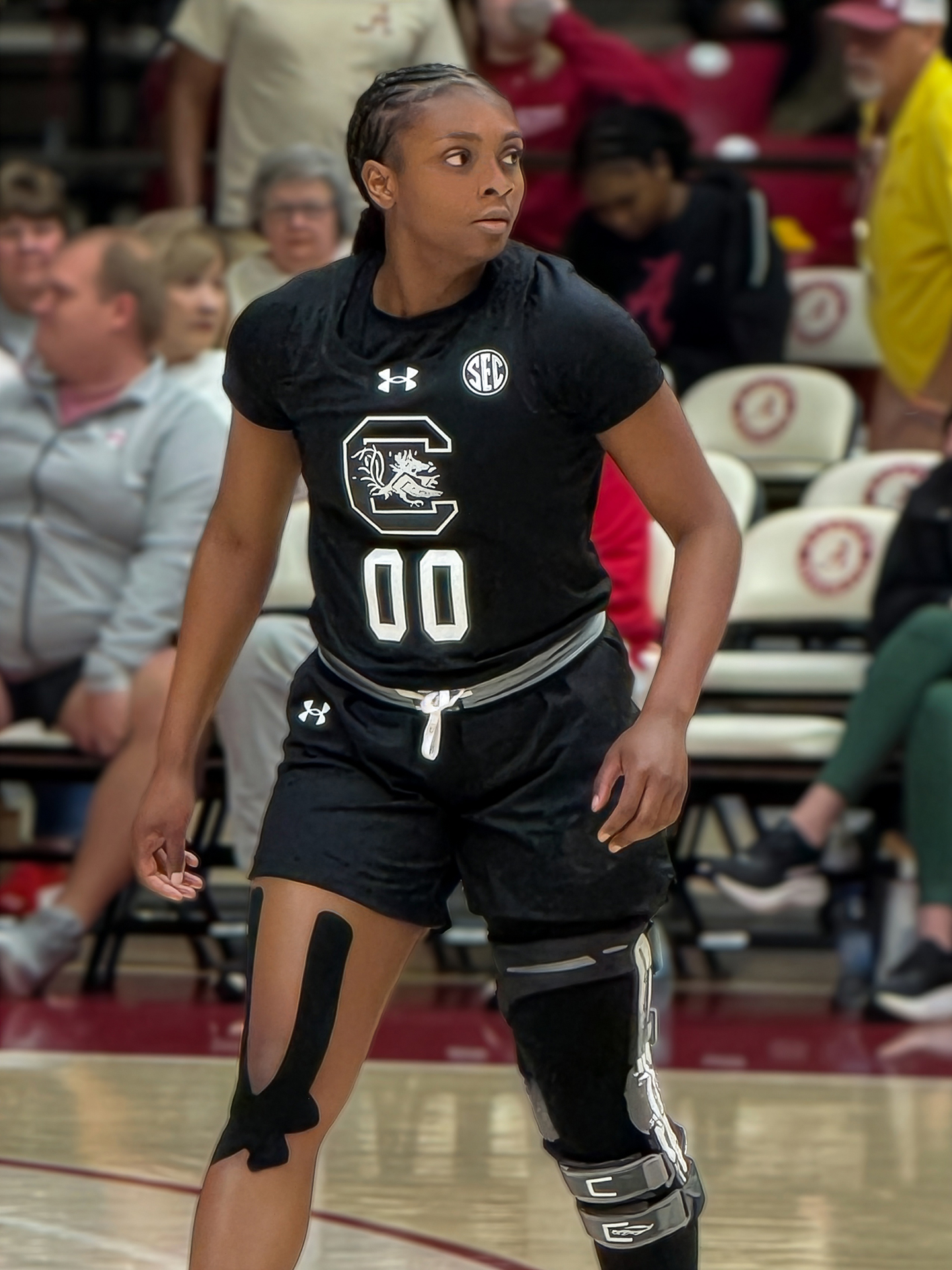
- Latson with South Carolina in 2026

No. 5 – Las Vegas Aces
- Position: Shooting guard
- League: WNBA

Personal information
- Born: December 26, 2003 (age 22) Miami, Florida, U.S.
- Listed height: 5 ft 8 in (1.73 m)

Career information
- High school: Miami Country Day (Miami, Florida); Charles W. Flanagan (Pembroke Pines, Florida); Westlake (Atlanta, Georgia); American Heritage (Plantation, Florida)
- College: Florida State (2022–2025); South Carolina (2025–2026)
- WNBA draft: 2026: 2nd round, 20th overall pick
- Drafted by: Los Angeles Sparks

Career history
- 2026: Los Angeles Sparks
- 2026-present: Las Vegas Aces

Career highlights
- Second-team All-American – AP, USBWA (2025); USBWA National Freshman of the Year (2023); WBCA Freshman of the Year (2023); 3× First-team All-ACC (2023–2025); ACC Rookie of the Year (2023); ACC All-Freshman Team (2023); NCAA season scoring leader (2025); McDonald's All-American (2022); Florida Miss Basketball (2022)
- Stats at WNBA.com
- Stats at Basketball Reference

Ta'Niya Latson (born December 26, 2003) is an American professional basketball player for the Las Vegas Aces of the Women's National Basketball Association (WNBA). Latson played college basketball for the Florida State Seminoles and the South Carolina Gamecocks.

== High school career ==
Latson played for Miami Country Day School in Miami, Florida and Charles W. Flanagan High School in Pembroke Pines, Florida during her freshman season, before moving to Westlake High School in Atlanta, Georgia. She was teammates with Raven Johnson at Westlake and led the team to its first GEICO Nationals title as a junior, as well as two state titles. For her senior season, Latson transferred to American Heritage School in Plantation, Florida. After leading the team to a Class 5A state title, she earned Miss Basketball, Gatorade Player of the Year and Class 5A Player of the Year honors for Florida. Latson was selected to play in the McDonald's All-American Game. Rated a five-star recruit by ESPN, she committed to play college basketball for Florida State over offers from Baylor, Georgia, Kentucky, Miami (Florida), NC State, Texas and Virginia Tech.

== College career ==
On November 7, 2022, Latson made her debut for Florida State, recording 28 points and nine rebounds in a 113–50 win over Bethune–Cookman. Three days later, in her second game, she scored 34 points in an 80–71 win over Kent State, the most points by a Florida State freshman since Sue Galkantas in 1981. On December 11, Latson scored 34 points again in a 108–51 win over Texas Southern. She missed the 2023 NCAA tournament with an undisclosed injury. As a freshman, Latson averaged 21.3 points, 4.5 rebounds and 2.9 assists per game and was a first-team All-Atlantic Coast Conference (ACC) selection. She scored 659 points, the most by a freshman in ACC history, and broke the program record with seven 30-point games. Latson was named ACC Rookie of the Year and set the conference record with 10 Rookie of the Week honors. She won the USBWA National Freshman of the Year and WBCA Freshman of the Year awards.

On March 27, 2025 Latson entered the transfer portal out of Florida State. On April 8, 2025 Latson announced she was transferring to South Carolina.

== Professional career ==
In the 2026 WNBA draft, Latson was selected twentieth overall by the Los Angeles Sparks. On April 17, 2026, she signed a rookie scale contract with the team. Despite making the team's final roster, she saw limited minutes. She was waived by the Sparks on July 6, 2026, to make way for Kate Martin.

On July 8, 2026, Latson was signed to development player contract with the Las Vegas Aces.

== Career statistics ==
Legend
GP	Games played	GS	Games started	MPG	Minutes per game	FG%	Field goal percentage
3P%	3-point field goal percentage	FT%	Free throw percentage	RPG	Rebounds per game	APG	Assists per game
SPG	Steals per game	BPG	Blocks per game	TO	Turnovers per game	PPG	Points per game
**Bold**	Career high	*	Led Division I

=== WNBA ===
WNBA regular season statistics
Year	Team	GP	GS	MPG	FG%	3P%	FT%	RPG	APG	SPG	BPG	TO	PPG
2026	Los Angeles	**10**	0	5.0	.273	.250	.733	1.0	.3	.0	.0	.7	1.8
2026	Las Vegas	9	0	**6.2**	**.542**	**.500**	**.800**	**.6**	**.4**	**.1**	**.1**	**.6**	**4.6**
**Career**	1 year, 2 teams	19	0	5.6	.457	.400	.767	.8	.4	.1	.1	.6	3.1

=== College ===
Year	Team	GP	GS	MPG	FG%	3P%	FT%	RPG	APG	SPG	BPG	TO	PPG
2022–23	Florida State	31	31	29.5	.455	**.362**	**.859**	4.5	2.9	1.6	**.7**	2.6	21.3
2023–24	Florida State	33	33	**31.0**	.438	.270	.853	4.2	4.2	1.5	.5	3.0	21.4
2024–25	Florida State	29	29	30.1	.451	.343	.818	**4.6**	**4.6**	**2.2**	.5	3.1	**25.2***
2025–26	South Carolina	**35**	**35**	28.1	**.486**	.325	.803	2.9	3.6	1.7	.3	**1.7**	14.1
**Career**		128	128	29.6	.455	.326	.834	4.0	3.8	1.7	.5	2.6	20.2
Statistics retrieved from Sports-Reference.

== Off the court ==
=== Business interests ===
On July 21, 2025, Latson was signed by Unrivaled, a 3x3 basketball league, to NIL deals as part of "The Future is Unrivaled Class of 2025".

=== In popular culture ===
In April 2024, Latson attended Kelsey Plum's second annual Dawg Class, a 3-day camp to help top women college athletes transition from collegiate to professional basketball. The 2024 camp was held at the IMG Academy and sponsored by Under Armour.
