= Early County School District =

School district in Georgia (U.S. state)

Address
- 11927 Columbia Street Blakely, Georgia, 39823; United States
- Coordinates: 31.380872°N 84.92119°W

District information
- Grades: Pre-school - 12
- Superintendent: Dr. Jennifer Brown
- Accreditation(s): Southern Association of Colleges and Schools; Georgia Accrediting Commission

Students and staff
- Enrollment: 2,164
- Faculty: 176

Other information
- Telephone: (229) 723-4337
- Fax: (229) 723-8183
- Website: www.early.k12.ga.us

The Early County School District is a public school district in Early County, Georgia, United States, based in Blakely. It serves the communities of Arlington, Blakely, Damascus, and Jakin.

== Schools ==
The Early County School District has one elementary school, one middle school, one high school, and one alternative school.

=== Elementary school ===
- Early County Elementary School

ECES serves approximately 1100 students in grades Pre-K through 5. The current principal is Matthew Cullifer.

=== Middle school ===
- Early County Middle School

ECMS serves students in grades 6-8. The current principal is Turner Floyd

=== High school ===
- Early County High School

ECHS serves students grades 9-12. The current principal is Randy Isom.

=== Alternative school ===
- Learning and Opportunity Academy
