= Sue Galkantas =

American basketball player

Sue Galkantas was a women's basketball player at Florida State. She is widely considered among Seminole fans to be among the best players the program has had. Her number (43) is one of the few ever retired by the university.

== Career ==
She is the only player in school history to score 2,322 points and 19.9 each game in 4 seasons. By the time she retired, she was the holder of 17 school records. She led FSU to back-to-back 20 win seasons in 1982 and 1983, although the Seminoles had never reached the postseason before. She was named a finalist for the 1983 Wade Trophy.

She was selected to the 1982 and 1983 honorable mention All-American teams by several publications and was also named to Street and Smith's freshman All-American team in 1981. Of her 120 career games, she scored in double figures 115 times and had 54 20-point games to her credit, as well as 11 30-point games. She was the first female athlete at FSU to have her number retired.
