= 2023–24 Atlantic Coast Conference women's basketball season =

- League: NCAA Division I
- Sport: Basketball
- Duration: November 6, 2023 – March 3, 2024
- Teams: 15
- Total attendance: 1,548,584
- TV partner(s): ACC Network, ESPN, The CW

WNBA Draft
- Top draft pick: Dyaisha Fair, Syracuse
- Picked by: Las Vegas Aces, 16th overall

2023–24 NCAA Division I women's basketball season
- Regular season Champions: Virginia Tech
- Runners-up: NC State; Syracuse; Notre Dame
- Season MVP: Elizabeth Kitley, Virginia Tech
- Top scorer: Hannah Hidalgo, Notre Dame – 23.76 ppg

ACC Tournament
- Champions: Notre Dame
- Finals MVP: Hannah Hidalgo, Notre Dame

Atlantic Coast Conference women's basketball seasons
- ← 2022–23 2024–25 →

2023–24 ACC women's basketball standings
	Conf.				Overall
Team	W		L	PCT	W		L	PCT
No. 18 Virginia Tech	14	–	4	.778	25	–	8	.758
No. 4 NC State	13	–	5	.722	31	–	7	.816
No. 20 Syracuse	13	–	5	.722	24	–	8	.750
No. 11 Notre Dame †	13	–	5	.722	28	–	7	.800
Louisville	12	–	6	.667	24	–	10	.706
Florida State	12	–	6	.667	23	–	11	.676
No. 17 Duke	11	–	7	.611	22	–	12	.647
North Carolina	11	–	7	.611	20	–	13	.606
Miami (FL)	8	–	10	.444	19	–	12	.613
Georgia Tech	7	–	11	.389	17	–	16	.515
Virginia	7	–	11	.389	16	–	16	.500
Clemson	5	–	13	.278	12	–	19	.387
Boston College	5	–	13	.278	14	–	19	.424
Wake Forest	2	–	16	.111	7	–	25	.219
Pittsburgh	2	–	16	.111	8	–	24	.250
† 2024 ACC tournament winner Rankings from AP poll

The 2023–24 Atlantic Coast Conference women's basketball season began with practices in October 2023, followed by the start of the 2023–24 NCAA Division I women's basketball season in November. Conference play started in December 2023 and ended on March 3, 2024. After the regular season, the 2024 ACC women's basketball tournament was held at the Greensboro Coliseum in Greensboro, NC for the 24th time in 25 years.

Virginia Tech finished as regular season champions, finishing one game ahead of NC State, Notre Dame and Syracuse. NC State and Syracuse were surprise finishers, as they were picked 8th and 9th, respectively, in the preseason poll. Virginia Tech could not convert their regular season championship into a Tournament championship, as Notre Dame won the ACC Tournament over NC State. The ACC sent eight teams to the NCAA Tournament. They finished with an overall record of 11–8 and NC State made it the furthest in the tournament. NC State reached the Final Four before losing to South Carolina.

== Head coaches ==
=== Coaching changes ===
- On March 3, 2023, just after the regular season Pittsburgh fired Lance White after five years as head coach. On April 7, 2023, Pittsburgh announced that Tory Verdi had been hired from UMass to become the next head coach of the team.

=== Coaches ===
Team	Head coach	Previous job	Years at school	Record at school	ACC record	ACC titles	NCAA tournaments	NCAA Final Fours	NCAA Championships
Boston College	Joanna Bernabei-McNamee	Albany	6	78–69	31–52	0	0	0	0
Clemson	Amanda Butler	Florida	6	69–87	27–60	0	1	0	0
Duke	Kara Lawson	Boston Celtics (Assistant)	4	46–21	16–16	0	1	0	0
Florida State	Brooke Wyckoff	Florida State (Assistant)	3	33–19	21–13	0	2	0	0
Georgia Tech	Nell Fortner	Auburn	5	71–48	37–35	0	2	0	0
Louisville	Jeff Walz	Maryland (Assistant)	17	440–125	202–62	1	8	4	0
Miami	Katie Meier	Charlotte	19	346–224	147–139	1	10	0	0
NC State	Wes Moore	Chattanooga	11	242–80	116–49	3	7	0	0
North Carolina	Courtney Banghart	Princeton	5	76–43	39–32	0	3	0	0
Notre Dame	Niele Ivey	Memphis Grizzlies (Assistant)	4	61–25	36–15	0	2	0	0
Pittsburgh	Tory Verdi	UMass	1	0–0	0–0	0	0	0	0
Syracuse	Felisha Legette-Jack	Buffalo	2	20–13	9–9	0	0	0	0
Virginia	Amaka Agugua-Hamilton	Missouri State	2	15–15	4–14	0	0	0	0
Virginia Tech	Kenny Brooks	James Madison	8	155–74	65–56	1	3	1	0
Wake Forest	Megan Gebbia	American	2	17–17	5–13	0	0	0	0

Notes:

- Year at school includes 2023–24 season.
- Overall and ACC records are from time at current school and are through the end the 2022–23 season.
- NCAA tournament appearances are from time at current school only.
- NCAA Final Fours and Championship include time at other schools

== Preseason ==
=== Preseason watch lists ===
Below is a table of notable preseason watch lists.

**Lieberman**	**Drysdale**	**Miller**	**McClain**	**Leslie**	**Naismith**
Deja Kelly – North Carolina; Olivia Miles – Notre Dame; Dyaisha Fair – Syracuse; Georgia Amoore – Virginia Tech	Ta'Niya Latson – Florida State; Sonia Citron – Notre Dame	Kiki Jefferson – Louisville; Alyssa Ustby – North Carolina	Olivia Cochran – Louisville; Mimi Collins – NC State; Maddy Westbeld – Notre Dame; Sam Brunelle – Virginia	Kennedy Brown – Duke; Maria Gakdeng – North Carolina; Elizabeth Kitley – Virginia Tech	Georgia Amoore – Virginia Tech; Sonia Citron – Notre Dame; Olivia Cochran – Louisville; Jayda Curry – Louisville; Dyaisha Fair – Syracuse; Deja Kelly – North Carolina; Elizabeth Kitley – Virginia Tech; Ta'Niya Latson – Florida State; Olivia Miles – Notre Dame; Saniya Rivers – NC State; Alyssa Ustby – North Carolina

=== ACC Women's Basketball Tip-off ===
The Preseason Media Poll and Preseason All-ACC teams was released after a tipoff event held at Hilton Hotel in uptown Charlotte, North Carolina on October 24, 2023. At the event, two players and each team's head coach will be available to talk to the media. ACC Network provided coverage of the event for television. The poll was released on October 26, 2023, and the results of the poll are below.

==== ACC Preseason poll ====
1. Virginia Tech – 1,116 (45)
2. Notre Dame – 1,052 (14)
3. North Carolina – 973 (1)
4. Louisville – 867 (1)
5. Florida State – 855
6. Miami – 702
7. Duke – 686
8. NC State – 652
9. Syracuse – 504
10. Virginia – 438
11. Clemson – 395
12. Georgia Tech – 342
13. Boston College – 226
14. Wake Forest – 192
15. Pittsburgh – 120

First-place votes shown in parentheses.

==== Preseason All-ACC Team ====
Position	Player	Class	School
C	**Elizabeth Kitley** (46)	Graduate Student	Virginia Tech
G	Ta'Niya Latson (4)	Sophomore	Florida State
G	Georgia Amoore (2)	Senior	Virginia Tech
G	Olivia Miles (3)	Junior	Notre Dame
G	Deja Kelly (1)	Senior	North Carolina
G	Sonia Citron (1)	Junior	Notre Dame
G	Dyaisha Fair (1)	Senior	Syracuse
G/F	Alyssa Ustby	Senior	North Carolina
F	Makayla Timpson	Junior	Florida State
F	Olivia Cochran (1)	Senior	Louisville

ACC Preseason Player of the Year shown in Bold.
First-place votes shown in parentheses.
Maddy Westbeld (Notre Dame) and Amari Robinson (Clemson) each received a first place vote but were not selected to the All-ACC Team.

==== Newcomer Watchlist ====
Position	Player	School
G	Hannah Hidalgo	Notre Dame
G	Kiki Jefferson	Louisville
G	Jayda Curry	Louisville
G	Lexi Donarski	North Carolina
G/F	Jadyn Donovan	Duke

== Regular season ==
=== Records against other conferences ===
2023–24 records against non-conference foes. Records shown for regular season only. Statistics through games played on January 27, 2024.

Power 7 Conferences	Record
American	5–2
Big East	5–6
Big Ten	5–5
Big 12	5–5
Pac-12	2–3
SEC	12–14
Power 7 Conferences Total	34–35
Other NCAA Division 1 Conferences	Record
America East	6–0
A-10	8–4
ASUN	5–1
Big Sky	0–0
Big South	8–0
Big West	0–0
CAA	10–1
C-USA	2–0
Division 1 Independents	1–0
Horizon	1–0
Ivy League	3–1
MAAC	2–0
MAC	5–2
MEAC	5–1
MVC	2–0
Mountain West	2–0
NEC	6–0
OVC	1–0
Patriot League	6–0
SoCon	9–1
Southland	1–0
SWAC	5–0
Summit League	0–0
Sun Belt	6–2
WAC	0–0
WCC	1–0
Other Division I Total	95–13
NCAA Division I Total	128–48

=== Record against ranked non-conference opponents ===
This is a list of games against ranked opponents only (rankings from the AP Poll):

Date	Visitor	Home	Site	Significance	Score	Conference record
November 6	No. 10 Notre Dame	No. 6 South Carolina†	Halle Georges Carpentier • Paris, France	Aflac Oui-Play	L 71–100	0–1
November 9	No. 11 Tennessee	No. 18 Florida State	Donald L. Tucker Center • Tallahassee, FL		W 92–91	1–1
November 9	No. 3 Iowa	No. 8 Virginia Tech†	Spectrum Center • Charlotte, NC		L 76–80	1–2
November 12	No. 2 Connecticut	NC State	Reynolds Coliseum • Raleigh, NC		W 92–81	2–2
November 16	Clemson	No. 1 South Carolina	Colonial Life Arena • Columbia, SC	Rivalry	L 40–109	2–3
November 16	Boston College	No. 13 Ohio State	Value City Arena • Columbus, OH		L 66–88	2–4
November 19	Syracuse	No. 20 Maryland	Xfinity Center • College Park, MD		L 81–83	2–5
November 19	No. 25 Oklahoma	Virginia	John Paul Jones Arena • Charlottesville, VA		L 67–82	2–6
November 19	Duke	No. 6 Stanford	Maples Pavilion • Stanford, CA		L 79–82 ^{OT}	2–7
November 24	Clemson	No. 25 Mississippi State†	Merrell Center • Katy, TX	Van Chancellor Classic	L 78–81	2–8
November 24	Florida State	No. 4 Stanford†	Dollar Loan Center • Henderson, NV	Ball Dawgs Classic	L 88–100	2–9
November 25	No. 10 NC State	No. 3 Colorado†	Sports and Fitness Center • St. Thomas, USVI	Paradise Jam	W 78–60	3–9
November 25	No. 18 North Carolina	No. 16 Kansas State†	Hertz Arena • Estero, FL	Gulf Coast Showcase	L 56–63	3–10
November 25	Virginia	No. 7 LSU	John Gray Gymnasium • George Town, Cayman Islands†	Cayman Islands Classic	L 73–76	3–11
November 29	No. 18 Notre Dame	No. 20 Tennessee	Thompson–Boling Arena • Knoxville, TN	ACC–SEC Challenge	W 74–69	4–11
November 29	Miami	No. 21 Mississippi State	Humphrey Coliseum • Starkville, MS	ACC–SEC Challenge	W 74–68	5–11
November 29	No. 22 Louisville	No. 19 Ole Miss	SJB Pavilion • Oxford, MS	ACC–SEC Challenge	W 64–58	6–11
November 30	No. 1 South Carolina	No. 24 North Carolina	Carmichael Arena • Chapel Hill, NC	ACC–SEC Challenge	L 58–65	6–12
November 30	No. 9 Virginia Tech	No. 7 LSU	Pete Maravich Assembly Center • Baton Rouge, LA	ACC–SEC Challenge	L 64–82	6–13
December 3	No. 1 South Carolina	Duke	Cameron Indoor Stadium • Durham, NC		L 61–77	6–14
December 10	No. 20 Florida State	No. 2 UCLA†	Mohegan Sun Arena • Uncasville, CT	Basketball Hall of Fame Showcase	L 78–95	6–15
December 10	No. 24 North Carolina	No. 17 Connecticut†	Mohegan Sun Arena • Uncasville, CT	Basketball Hall of Fame Showcase	L 64–76	6–16
December 16	No. 18 Louisville	No. 17 Connecticut	XL Center • Hartford, CT		L 62–82	6–17
December 16	No. 24 Miami	No. 10 Baylor†	Frost Bank Center • San Antonio, TX	Hall of Fame Series	L 57–75	6–18
December 20	No. 23 Washington	No. 19 Louisville	KFC Yum! Center • Louisville, KY		W 59–51	7–18
January 27	No. 15 Notre Dame	No. 8 Connecticut	Gampel Pavilion • Storrs, CT	Rivalry	W 82–67	8–18

Team rankings are reflective of AP poll when the game was played, not current or final ranking

† denotes game was played on neutral site

=== Rankings ===
Legend
Increase in ranking
Decrease in ranking
Not ranked previous week
First Place votes shown in ()

		Pre	Wk 2	Wk 3	Wk 4	Wk 5	Wk 6	Wk 7	Wk 8	Wk 9	Wk 10	Wk 11	Wk 12	Wk 13	Wk 14	Wk 15	Wk 16	Wk 17	Wk 18	Wk 19	Wk 20	Final
Boston College	AP																					
Boston College	C																					
Clemson	AP																					
Clemson	C																					
Duke	AP	RV	RV	RV											RV	RV		RV	RV	RV	RV	17
Duke	C	19	22	RV	RV	RV	RV	RV	RV							RV	RV	RV				21
Florida State	AP	18	12	13	15	20	22	21т	22	22	21	15	23	RV	RV			RV		RV	RV	
Florida State	C	22	13	13	15	20	22	22	22	22	20	18	24	RV	RV	RV	RV					
Georgia Tech	AP																					
Georgia Tech	C																					
Louisville	AP	17	19	20	22	18	18	19	19	17	15	13	18	16	15	18	20	22	24	24	23	RV
Louisville	C	15	15	15	19	18	17	19	19	16	15	12	16	12	15	18	20	23	24	25	25	RV
Miami	AP	RV	RV	RV	RV	RV	24	RV	RV	RV	RV		RV									
Miami	C	25	RV	RV	RV	RV	23	24	23	RV	RV	RV	RV	RV								
North Carolina	AP	16	17	18	24	24	25	24	24	RV	20	23	20	24	RV	RV	RV	RV	RV			RV
North Carolina	C	17	16	17	24	24	25	25	RV	RV	22	24	21	24	RV							RV
NC State	AP	RV	14	10т	5	3	3	3	3	3	6	4	7	5	3	6	6	12	10	11	11	4
NC State	C	RV	18	16	10	5	4	4	4	4	9	5т	7	5	3	7	6	11	10	11	11	4
Notre Dame	AP	10	16	17	18	14	14	14	13	16	18	19	15	14	12	16	19	17	14	9	9	11
Notre Dame	C	10	14	14	14	12	12	12	12	17	19	19	18	16	14	17	18	17	14	10	10	11
Pittsburgh	AP																					
Pittsburgh	C																					
Syracuse	AP							RV	RV	25	RV	RV	22	21	23	19	17	19	20	22	22	20
Syracuse	C				RV	RV	RV	RV	RV	RV	RV	25	22	23	23	20	17	19	20	23	23	23
Virginia	AP												RV									
Virginia	C																					
Virginia Tech	AP	8	9	9	9	15	16	15	14	13	11	14	19	17	16	12	8	5	11	13	13	18
Virginia Tech	C	5	9	9	9	13	14	14	14	11	11	14	19	18	18	13	8	4	11	13	12	17
Wake Forest	AP																					
Wake Forest	C																					

=== Conference Matrix ===
This table summarizes the head-to-head results between teams in conference play. Each team played 18 conference games, and at least 1 against each opponent.

	Boston College	Clemson	Duke	Florida State	Georgia Tech	Louisville	Miami	North Carolina	NC State	Notre Dame	Pittsburgh	Syracuse	Virginia	Virginia Tech	Wake Forest
vs. Boston College	–	65–55	80–75	84–71	69–54	88–60; 69–67	64–70	74–78	82–61	98–48; 79–55	71–84 (OT); 58–84	71–64; 75–63	73–66	74–63	65–68
vs. Clemson	55–65	–	64–80	78–72; 82–79 (OT)	70–62; 64–63	81–64	75–72 (OT); 56–50	82–76	71–46	74–47	72–57	83–82	69–75	74–62	59–73; 64–68
vs. Duke	75–80	80–64	–	46–88	46–84	61–44	64–58	60–68 (OT); 63–59	72–57; 58–69	70–62	38–69	45–58	56–60; 54–73	46–63; 61–56	46–69
vs. Florida State	71–84	72–78; 79–82 (OT)	88–46	–	80–95; 67–78	70–55	68–75; 68–74	62–70	88–80 (OT)	98–94 (2OT)	60–76	79–73	91–87	81–89	61–73; 63–71
vs. Georgia Tech	54–69	62–70; 63–64	84–46	95–80; 78–67	–	80–62	62–60; 66–71	73–68	86–85 (OT)	85–48	58–68	62–59	60–63	87–69	55–58; 71–66
vs. Louisville	60–88; 67–69	64–81	44–61	55–70	62–80	–	72–77	79–68	77–67	66–73; 74–58	44–74; 58–77	69–81; 73–72	73–68	86–70	62–83
vs. Miami	70–64	72–75 (OT); 50–56	58–64	75–68; 74–68	60–62; 71–66	77–72	–	66–61	59–73	70–59	44–62	71–60	77–60	76–52	47–77; 54–72
vs. North Carolina	78–74	76–82	68–60 (OT); 59–63	70–62	68–73	68–79	61–66	–	63–59; 70–80	57–61	62–75	51–75	68–81; 81–66	70–61 (OT); 74–62	50–58
vs. NC State	61–82	49–71	57–72; 69–58	80–88 (OT)	85–86 (OT)	67–77	73–59	59–63; 80–70	–	43–59	47–83	71–75 (OT)	61–72; 66–93	63–62; 72–61	57–75
vs. Notre Dame	48–98; 55–79	47–74	62–70	94–98 (2OT)	48–85	73–66; 58–74	59–70	61–57	59–43	–	66–71; 53–78	86–81; 79–65	76–86	58–71	56–75
vs. Pittsburgh	84–71 (OT); 84–58	57–72	69–38	76–60	68–58	74–44; 77–58	62–44	75–62	83–47	71–66; 78–53	–	72–59; 63–53	52–56	91–41	65–50
vs. Syracuse	64–71; 63–75	82–83	58–45	73–79	59–62	81–69; 72–73	60–71	75–51	75–71 (OT)	81–86; 65–79	59–72; 53–63	–	79–85	75–62	56–77
vs. Virginia	66–73	75–69	60–56; 73–54	87–91	63–60	68–73	60–77	81–68; 66–81	72–61; 93–66	86–76	56–52	85–79	–	76–63; 75–80	79–87
vs. Virginia Tech	63–74	62–74	63–46; 56–61	89–81	69–87	70–86	52–76	61–70 (OT); 62–74	62–63; 61–72	71–58	41–91	62–75	63–76; 80–75	–	73–82
vs. Wake Forest	68–65	73–59; 68–64	69–46	73–61; 71–63	58–55; 66–71	83–62	77–47; 72–54	58–50	75–57	75–56	50–65	77–56	87–79	82–73	–
Total	5–13	5–13	11–7	12–6	7–11	12–6	8-10	11–7	13–5	13–5	2–16	13–5	7–11	14–4	2–16

=== Player of the week ===
Throughout the conference regular season, the Atlantic Coast Conference offices named a Player(s) of the week and a Rookie(s) of the week.

Week	Player of the week	Rookie of the week	Reference
Week 1 – November 13	Saniya Rivers – NC State	Hannah Hidalgo – Notre Dame	
Week 2 – November 20	Hannah Hidalgo – Notre Dame	Hannah Hidalgo (2) – Notre Dame	
Week 3 – November 27	Elizabeth Kitley – Virginia Tech	Hannah Hidalgo (3) – Notre Dame	
Week 4 – December 4	Liatu King – Pittsburgh	Alyssa Latham – Syracuse	
Week 5 – December 11	Kara Dunn – Georgia Tech	Zoe Brooks – NC State	
Week 6 – December 18	Amari Robinson – Clemson	Hannah Hidalgo (4) – Notre Dame	
Week 7 – December 26	Hannah Hidalgo (2) – Notre Dame	Hannah Hidalgo (5) – Notre Dame	
Week 8 – January 2	Ta'Niya Latson – Florida State	Hannah Hidalgo (6) – Notre Dame	
Week 9 – January 8	Elizabeth Kitley (2) – Virginia Tech	Hannah Hidalgo (7) – Notre Dame	
Week 10 – January 15	Sara Bejedi – Florida State	Hannah Hidalgo (8) – Notre Dame	
Week 11 – January 22	Dyaisha Fair – Syracuse	Kymora Johnson – Virginia	
Week 12 – January 29	Georgia Amoore – Virginia Tech	Hannah Hidalgo (9) – Notre Dame	
Week 13 – February 5	Dyaisha Fair (2) – Syracuse	Hannah Hidalgo (10) – Notre Dame	
Week 13 – February 5	Elizabeth Kitley (3) – Virginia Tech	Hannah Hidalgo (10) – Notre Dame	
Week 14 – February 12	Elizabeth Kitley (4) – Virginia Tech	Hannah Hidalgo (11) – Notre Dame	
Week 15 – February 19	Elizabeth Kitley (5) – Virginia Tech	Rusne Augustinaite – Georgia Tech	
Week 16 – February 26	Elizabeth Kitley (6) – Virginia Tech	Kymora Johnson (2) – Virginia	
Week 17 – March 4	Hannah Hidalgo (3) – Notre Dame	Hannah Hidalgo (12) – Notre Dame	

== Postseason ==
=== ACC Tournament ===
First round Wednesday, March 6
12	Clemson	72
13	Boston College	85
10	Georgia Tech	73
15	Pittsburgh	60
11	Virginia	55
14	Wake Forest	58

Second round Thursday, March 7
8	North Carolina	59
9	Miami	60
5	#24 Louisville	58
13	Boston College	55
7	Duke	70
10	Georgia Tech	58
6	Florida State	70
14	Wake Forest	53

Quarterfinals; Friday, March 8
1	#11 Virginia Tech	55
9	Miami	47
4	#14 Notre Dame	77
5	#24 Louisville	68
2	#10 NC State	54
7	Duke	51
3	#20 Syracuse	65
6	Florida State	78

Semifinals; Saturday, March 9
1	#11 Virginia Tech	53
4	#14 Notre Dame	82
2	#10 NC State	69
6	Florida State	43

Championship; Sunday, March 10
4	#14 Notre Dame	55
2	#10 NC State	51

=== NCAA tournament ===
Seed	Region	School	1st Round	2nd Round	Sweet 16	Elite Eight	Final Four	Championship
2	Albany 1	Notre Dame	W 81–67 vs. #15 Kent State – (Notre Dame, IN)	W 71–56 vs. #7 Ole Miss – (Notre Dame, IN)	L 65–70 vs. #3 Oregon State – (Albany, NY)			
3	Portland 4	NC State	W 64–44 vs. #14 Chattanooga – (Raleigh, NC)	W 79–72 vs. #6 Tennessee – (Raleigh, NC)	W 77–67 vs. #2 Stanford – (Portland, OR)	W 76–66 vs. #1 Texas – (Portland, OR)	L 59–78 vs. #1 South Carolina – (Cleveland, OH)	
4	Portland 3	Virginia Tech	W 92–49 vs. #13 Marshall – (Blacksburg, VA)	L 72–75 vs. #5 Baylor – (Blacksburg, VA)				
6	Albany 2	Louisville	L 69–71 vs. #11 Middle Tennessee – (Baton Rouge, LA)					
6	Portland 3	Syracuse	W 74–69 vs. #11 Arizona – (Storrs, CT)	L 64–72 at #3 Connecticut – (Storrs, CT)				
7	Portland 3	Duke	W 72–61 vs. #10 Richmond – (Columbus, OH)	W 75–63 at #2 Ohio State – (Columbus, OH)	L 45–53 vs. #3 Connecticut – (Portland, OR)			
8	Albany 1	North Carolina	W 59–56 vs. #9 Michigan State – (Columbia, SC)	L 41–88 at #1 South Carolina – (Columbia, SC)				
9	Portland 4	Florida State	L 74–82 vs. #8 Alabama – (Austin, TX)					
		W–L (%):	6–2 (.750)	3–3 (.500)	1–2 (.333)	1–0 (1.000)	0–1 (.000)	0–0 (–) Total: 11–8 (.579)

=== WBIT tournament ===
Seed	Region	School	1st Round	2nd Round	Quarterfinals	Semifinals	Championship
4	Villanova	Virginia	W 81–59 vs. High Point – (Charlottesville, VA)	L 55–73 @ #1 Villanova – (Villanova, PA)			
—	Penn State	Georgia Tech	L 47–84 @ #2 Mississippi State – (Starkville, MS)				
		W–L (%):	1–1 (.500)	0–1 (.000)	0–0 (–)	0–0 (–)	0–0 (–) Total: 1–2 (.333)

== Honors and awards ==
=== All-Americans ===
Associated Press	WCBA	USBWA
First Team
Hannah Hidalgo	Hannah Hidalgo; Elizabeth Kitley	None
Second Team
Elizabeth Kitley	None	Hannah Hidalgo; Elizabeth Kitley
Third Team
Georgia Amoore; Dyaisha Fair	None	Georgia Amoore; Dayisha Fair

=== ACC Awards ===
The ACC announced its end of season awards on March 5, 2024 ahead of the start of the ACC tournament.

2023-24 ACC Women's Basketball Individual Awards
Award	Recipient(s)
Player of the Year	Elizabeth Kitley – Virginia Tech
Coach of the Year	Felisha Legette-Jack – Syracuse
Defensive Player of the Year	Hannah Hidalgo – Notre Dame
Freshman of the Year	Hannah Hidalgo – Notre Dame
Sixth Player of the Year	Oluchi Okananwa – Duke
Most Improved Player	Liatu King – Pittsburgh

2023-24 ACC Women's Basketball All-Conference Teams
First Team	Second Team	Freshman Team
Elizabeth Kitley – Virginia Tech; Dyaisha Fair – Syracuse; Hannah Hidalgo – Notre Dame; Georgia Amoore – Virginia Tech; Ta'Niya Latson – Florida State; Deja Kelly – North Carolina; Aziaha James – NC State; Saniya Rivers – NC State; Makayla Timpson – Florida State; Liatu King – Pittsburgh	Maddy Westbeld – Notre Dame; Amari Robinson – Clemson; Sonia Citron – Notre Dame; Alyssa Ustby – North Carolina; Kiki Jefferson – Louisville; Kymora Johnson – Virginia; Tonie Morgan – Georgia Tech; Kara Dunn – Georgia Tech; Reigan Richardson – Duke; Olivia Cochran – Louisville	Hannah Hidalgo – Notre Dame; Kymora Johnson – Virginia; Zoe Brooks – NC State; Oluchi Okananwa – Duke; Alyssa Latham – Syracuse

2023-24 ACC Women's Basketball All-ACC Defensive Team
Player	Team
Hannah Hidalgo	Notre Dame
Makayla Timpson	Florida State
Elizabeth Kitley	Virginia Tech
Saniya Rivers	NC State
Dontavia Waggoner	Boston College

== WNBA draft ==
The ACC had three players selected in the 2024 WNBA draft.

Player	Team	Round	Pick #	Position	School
Dyaisha Fair	Las Vegas Aces	2	16	PG	Syracuse
Elizabeth Kitley	Las Vegas Aces	2	24	C	Virginia Tech
Kiki Jefferson	Minnesota Lynx	3	31	G	Louisville
