= 2023–24 Virginia Cavaliers women's basketball team =

Intercollegiate basketball season

2023–24 Virginia Cavaliers women's basketball

WBIT, Second Round
- Conference: Atlantic Coast Conference
- Record: 16–16 (7–11 ACC)
- Head coach: Amaka Agugua-Hamilton (2nd season)
- Assistant coaches: Alysiah Bond; Tori Jankoska; CJ Jones; Janko Popovic
- Home arena: John Paul Jones Arena

2023–24 ACC women's basketball standings
	Conf.				Overall
Team	W		L	PCT	W		L	PCT
No. 18 Virginia Tech	14	–	4	.778	25	–	8	.758
No. 4 NC State	13	–	5	.722	31	–	7	.816
No. 20 Syracuse	13	–	5	.722	24	–	8	.750
No. 11 Notre Dame †	13	–	5	.722	28	–	7	.800
Louisville	12	–	6	.667	24	–	10	.706
Florida State	12	–	6	.667	23	–	11	.676
No. 17 Duke	11	–	7	.611	22	–	12	.647
North Carolina	11	–	7	.611	20	–	13	.606
Miami (FL)	8	–	10	.444	19	–	12	.613
Georgia Tech	7	–	11	.389	17	–	16	.515
Virginia	7	–	11	.389	16	–	16	.500
Clemson	5	–	13	.278	12	–	19	.387
Boston College	5	–	13	.278	14	–	19	.424
Wake Forest	2	–	16	.111	7	–	25	.219
Pittsburgh	2	–	16	.111	8	–	24	.250
† 2024 ACC tournament winner Rankings from AP poll

The 2023–24 Virginia Cavaliers women's basketball team represented the University of Virginia during the 2023–24 NCAA Division I women's basketball season. The Cavaliers were led by second-year head coach Amaka Agugua-Hamilton, and played their home games at John Paul Jones Arena as members of the Atlantic Coast Conference.

Virginia started the season by winning three straight games before losing to twenty-fifth ranked Oklahoma. They split a pair of games in the Cayman Islands Classic, including a three point loss to seventh ranked LSU. They won four of their last five non-conference games, including an overtime win in the ACC–SEC Challenge against Missouri and a loss to Wofford. They finished their non-conference schedule 8–3. The Cavaliers lost their first six ACC regular season games. They lost one of their next three and their two wins were over fifteenth ranked Florida State and twentieth ranked North Carolina. They would lose their next two games. However from there they won four of five, including a win over twentieth ranked Louisville and the only loss coming to nineteenth ranked Syracuse. In the penultimate game of the season, they lost to Duke, but they finished the season with their biggest win of the year, a rivalry victory over Virginia Tech.

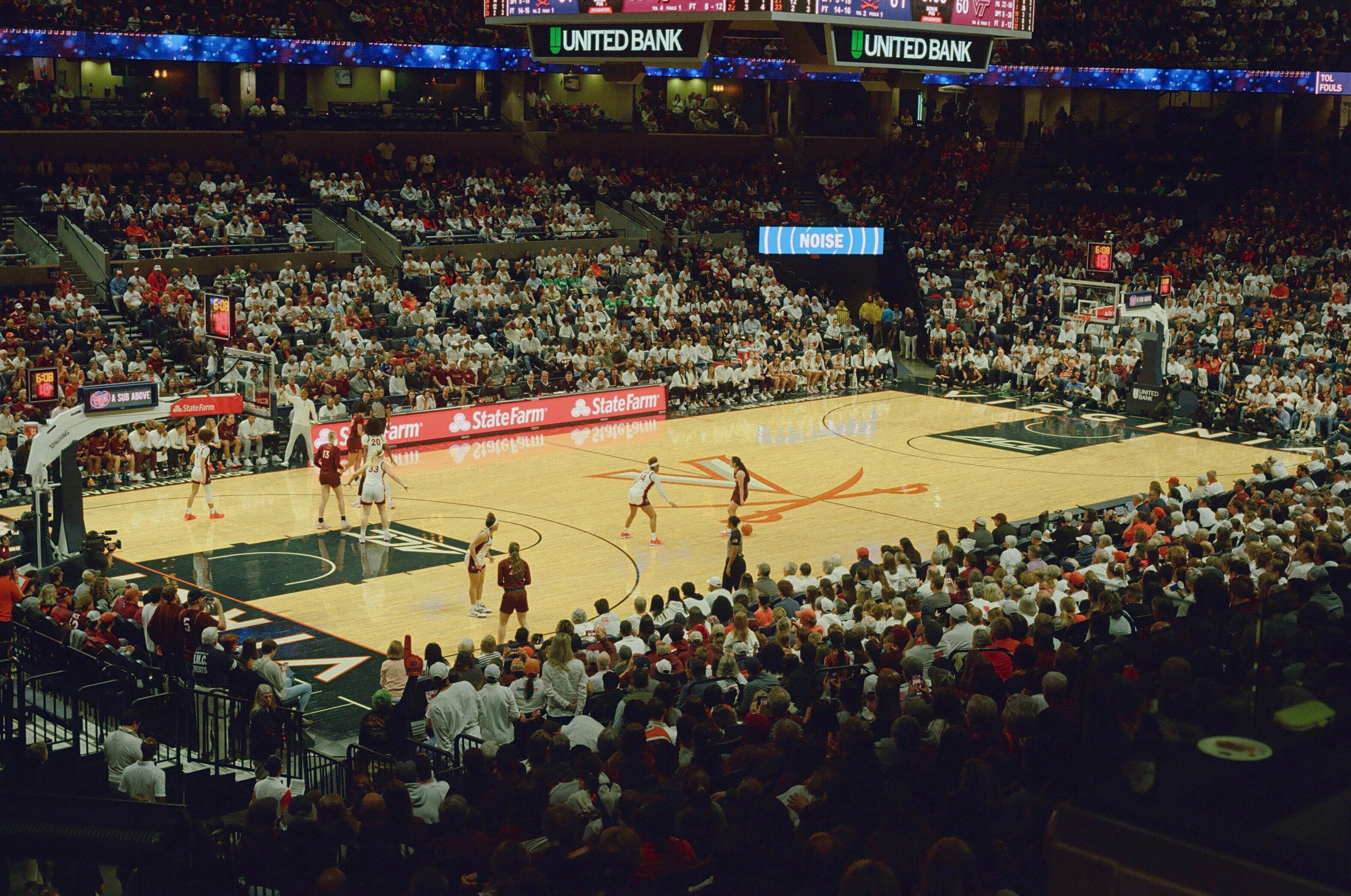
The Cavaliers playing the Hokies in the Commonwealth Clash, the Cavaliers won 80-75

The Cavaliers finished the season 16–16 overall and 7–11 in ACC play to finish in a tie for tenth place. As the eleventh seed in the ACC tournament, they lost to fourteenth seed Wake Forest in the first round. They received an at-large invitation to the inaugural WBIT. As a fourth seed they defeated High Point in the first round before losing to first seed Villanova to end their season. A highlight of the season was freshman G. Kymora Johnson being selected to the All-ACC Second Team.

== Previous season ==
After firing Tina Thompson after the previous season, Virginia announced that Amaka Agugua-Hamilton would be the new head coach of the program.

The Cavaliers finished the season 15–15 and 4–14 in ACC play to finish in a tie for thirteenth place. As the thirteenth seed in the ACC tournament they lost their First round matchup with Wake Forest. They were not invited to the NCAA tournament and declined an invitation to the WNIT.

== Offseason ==
=== Departures ===
Departures
Name	Number	Pos.	Height	Year	Hometown	Reason for departure
Carole Miller	1	G	6'0"	Senior	Alexandria, Virginia	Graduated; Transferred to James Madison
Taylor Valladay	2	G	5'7"	Senior	Chicago, Illinois	Graduated; Transferred to Penn State
AnnaLiese Griffin	15	G	6'1"	Freshman	Joliet, Illinois	Transferred to Arkansas State
McKenna Dale	44	G	6'0"	Graduate Student	Storrs, Connecticut	Graduated

=== Incoming transfers ===
Incoming transfers
Name	Number	Pos.	Height	Year	Hometown	Previous school
Paris Clark	1	G	5'8"	Sophomore	New York, New York	Arizona
Jillian Brown	4	G	5'10"	Junior	Grand Rapids, Michigan	Northwestern
Taylor Lauterbach	41	C	6'7"	Graduate Student	Appleton, Wisconsin	Kansas State

=== Recruiting class ===
College recruiting information
Name	Hometown	School	Height	Weight	Commit date
Kymora Johnson; G	Charlottesville, Virginia	St. Anne's-Belfield	5 ft 7 in (1.70 m)	N/A	
Kymora Johnson; G	Recruit ratings: ESPN: (96)				
Olivia McGhee; G	Louisa, Virginia	IMG Academy	6 ft 2 in (1.88 m)	N/A	
Olivia McGhee; G	Recruit ratings: ESPN: (94)				
Edessa Noyan; F	Södertälje, Sweden	Täljegymnasiet	6 ft 3 in (1.91 m)	N/A	
Edessa Noyan; F	Recruit ratings: No ratings found				
Overall recruit ranking:
Note: In many cases, Scout, Rivals, 247Sports, On3, and ESPN may conflict in their listings of height and weight.; In these cases, the average was taken. ESPN grades are on a 100-point scale.; Sources:

== Roster ==
2023–24 Virginia Cavaliers women's basketball team
Players
Coaches

Pos.	#	Name	Height	Year	Previous school	Hometown
G	0	Olivia McGhee	6 ft 2 in (1.88 m)	Fr	IMG Academy	Louisa, VA
G	1	Paris Clark	5 ft 8 in (1.73 m)	So	Long Island Lutheran; Arizona	New York, NY
G	4	Jillian Brown	5 ft 10 in (1.78 m)	Jr	East Grand Rapids; Northwestern	Grand Rapids, MI
G	5	Yonta Vaughn	5 ft 8 in (1.73 m)	So	Bishop McNamara	District Heights, MD
G/F	10	Mir Mclean	5 ft 11 in (1.8 m)	Sr	Roland Park; Connecticut	Baltimore, MD
F	12	Edessa Noyan	6 ft 3 in (1.91 m)	Fr	Täljegymnasiet	Södertälje, Sweden
G	14	Kaydan Lawson	6 ft 0 in (1.83 m)	Sr	Orange	Cleveland, OH
F	20	Camryn Taylor	6 ft 2 in (1.88 m)	GS	Richwoods; Marquette	Peoria, IL
G	21	Kymora Johnson	5 ft 7 in (1.7 m)	Fr	St. Anne's-Belfield	Charlottesville, VA
G	23	Alexia Smith	5 ft 8 in (1.73 m)	Sr	Columbus Africentric; Minnesota	Columbus, OH
G	32	Cady Pauley	5 ft 11 in (1.8 m)	So	Milan	Milan, MO
F	33	Sam Brunelle	6 ft 2 in (1.88 m)	GS	William Monroe; Notre Dame	Ruckersville, VA
F	34	London Clarkson	6 ft 2 in (1.88 m)	GS	Pflugerville; Florida State	Pflugerville, TX
C	41	Taylor Lauterbach	6 ft 7 in (2.01 m)	GS	Appleton West; Kansas State	Appleton, WI

Head coach

- Amaka Agugua-Hamilton (Hofstra)

Assistant coach(es)

- CJ Jones (Francis Marion)
- Tori Jankoska (Michigan State)
- Alysiah Bond (Ohio State)
- Janko Popovic (Winthrop)

Legend

- (C) Team captain
- (S) Suspended
- (I) Ineligible
- (W) Walk-on
- Injured
- Current redshirt

Roster

== Schedule ==
Date time, TV	Rank^{#}	Opponent^{#}	Result	Record	Site (attendance) city, state
Exhibition
November 2, 2023*; 6:00 p.m.		Pitt Johnstown	W 102–51	–	John Paul Jones Arena; Charlottesville, VA
Non-conference regular season
November 8, 2023*; 7:00 p.m., ACCNX		Maryland Eastern Shore	W 76–52	1–0	John Paul Jones Arena (3,797); Charlottesville, VA
November 12, 2023*; 2:00 p.m., ACCNX		Campbell	W 74–49	2–0	John Paul Jones Arena (3,965); Charlottesville, VA
November 15, 2023*; 7:00 p.m., ACCNX		William & Mary	W 80–51	3–0	John Paul Jones Arena (3,588); Charlottesville, VA
November 19, 2023*; 2:00 p.m., ACCN		No. 25 Oklahoma	L 67–82	3–1	John Paul Jones Arena (4,198); Charlottesville, VA
November 24, 2023*; 11:00 a.m., FloHoops		vs. Tulane; Cayman Islands Classic	W 81–59	4–1	John Gray Gymnasium; George Town, Cayman Islands
November 25, 2023*; 5:00 p.m., FloHoops		vs. No. 7 LSU; Cayman Islands Classic	L 73–76	4–2	John Gray Gymnasium (1,650); George Town, Cayman Islands
November 30, 2023*; 5:00 p.m., ACCN		Missouri; ACC–SEC Challenge	W 87–81 ^{OT}	5–2	John Paul Jones Arena (3,701); Charlottesville, VA
December 3, 2023*; 1:00 p.m., ESPN+		at La Salle	W 94–73	6–2	Tom Gola Arena (387); Philadelphia, PA
December 6, 2023*; 7:00 p.m., ACCNX		Rider	W 78–51	7–2	John Paul Jones Arena (3,676); Charlottesville, VA
December 16, 2023*; 1:00 p.m., ACCNX		Wofford	L 70–71	7–3	John Paul Jones Arena (3,955); Charlottesville, VA
December 21, 2023*; 6:00 p.m., ACCNX		Fordham	W 82–56	8–3	John Paul Jones Arena (4,208); Charlottesville, VA
ACC regular season
December 31, 2023; 6:00 p.m., ACCN		No. 3 NC State	L 61–72	8–4 (0–1)	John Paul Jones Arena (4,541); Charlottesville, VA
January 4, 2024; 7:00 p.m., ACCNX		at Georgia Tech	L 60–63	8–5 (0–2)	McCamish Pavilion (1,237); Atlanta, GA
January 7, 2024; 12:00 p.m., The CW		Duke	L 56–60	8–6 (0–3)	John Paul Jones Arena (5,041); Charlottesville, VA
January 11, 2024; 7:00 p.m., ACCNX		at No. 6 NC State	L 66–93	8–7 (0–4)	Reynolds Coliseum (5,500); Raleigh, NC
January 14, 2024; 4:00 p.m., ACCN		at No. 20 North Carolina	L 68–81	8–8 (0–5)	Carmichael Arena (4,579); Chapel Hill, NC
January 18, 2024; 7:00 p.m., ACCNX		No. 19 Notre Dame	L 76–86	8–9 (0–6)	John Paul Jones Arena (4,152); Charlottesville, VA
January 21, 2024; 2:00 p.m., ACCNX		at No. 15 Florida State	W 91–87	9–9 (1–6)	Donald L. Tucker Center (2,081); Tallahassee, FL
January 25, 2024; 7:00 p.m., ACCNX		Pittsburgh	L 52–56	9–10 (1–7)	John Paul Jones Arena (3,817); Charlottesville, VA
January 28, 2024; 12:00 p.m., The CW		No. 20 North Carolina	W 81–66	10–10 (2–7)	John Paul Jones Arena (5,690); Charlottesville, VA
February 1, 2024; 6:00 p.m., ACCN		at No. 17 Virginia Tech; Rivalry	L 63–76	10–11 (2–8)	Cassell Coliseum (8,925); Blacksburg, VA
February 4, 2024; 4:00 p.m., ACCN		Clemson	L 69–75	10–12 (2–9)	John Paul Jones Arena (4,959); Charlottesville, VA
February 8, 2024; 6:00 p.m., ACCN		at Boston College	W 73–66	11–12 (3–9)	Conte Forum (756); Chestnut Hill, MA
February 11, 2024; 2:00 p.m., ACCNX		at Wake Forest	W 87–79	12–12 (4–9)	LJVM Coliseum (1,201); Winston–Salem, NC
February 18, 2024; 2:00 p.m., ACCN		No. 19 Syracuse	L 79–85	12–13 (4–10)	John Paul Jones Arena (6,619); Charlottesville, VA
February 22, 2024; 7:00 p.m., ACCNX		Miami (FL)	W 77–60	13–13 (5–10)	John Paul Jones Arena (3,968); Charlottesville, VA
February 25, 2024; 12:00 p.m., The CW		at No. 20 Louisville	W 73–68	14–13 (6–10)	KFC Yum! Center (10,305); Louisville, KY
February 29, 2024; 7:00 p.m., ACCNX		at Duke	L 54–73	14–14 (6–11)	Cameron Indoor Stadium (2,005); Durham, NC
March 3, 2024; 6:00 p.m., ACCN		No. 5 Virginia Tech; Rivalry	W 80–75	15–14 (7–11)	John Paul Jones Arena (11,975); Charlottesville, VA
ACC Women's Tournament
March 6, 2024; 6:30 p.m., ACCN	(11)	vs. (14) Wake Forest; First Round	L 55–58	15–15	Greensboro Coliseum (6,322); Greensboro, NC
NCAA WBIT
March 21, 2024*; 7:00 p.m., ESPN+	(4)	High Point; First Round	W 81–59	16–15	John Paul Jones Arena (1,883); Charlottesville, VA
March 24, 2024*; 2:00 p.m., ESPN+	(4)	at (1) Villanova; Second Round	L 55–73	16–16	Finneran Pavilion (1,315); Villanova, PA
*Non-conference game. ^{#}Rankings from AP Poll. (#) Tournament seedings in parentheses. All times are in Eastern.

== Rankings ==
+ Regular season polls	Poll	Pre- Season	Week 2	Week 3	Week 4	Week 5	Week 6	Week 7	Week 8	Week 9	Week 10	Week 11	Week 12	Week 13	Week 14	Week 15	Week 16	Week 17	Week 18	Week 19	Week 20	Final
AP	NR	NR	NR	NR	NR	NR	NR	NR	NR	NR	NR	RV	NR	NR	NR	NR	NR	NR	NR	NR	NR	
Coaches	NR	NR	NR	NR	NR	NR	NR	NR	NR	NR	NR	NR	NR	NR	NR	NR	NR	NR	NR	NR	NR	

Legend
	Increase in ranking
	Decrease in ranking
	Not ranked previous week
(RV)	Received Votes
(NR)	Not Ranked
