= 2023–24 Notre Dame Fighting Irish women's basketball team =

Intercollegiate basketball season

2023–24 Notre Dame Fighting Irish women's basketball

ACC tournament champions

NCAA tournament, Sweet Sixteen
- Conference: Atlantic Coast Conference

Ranking
- Coaches: No. 11
- AP: No. 11
- Record: 28–7 (13–5 ACC)
- Head coach: Niele Ivey (4th season)
- Associate head coach: Carol Owens (24th season)
- Assistant coaches: Michaela Mabrey (5th season); Charel Allen (2nd season)
- Home arena: Purcell Pavilion

2023–24 ACC women's basketball standings
	Conf.				Overall
Team	W		L	PCT	W		L	PCT
No. 18 Virginia Tech	14	–	4	.778	25	–	8	.758
No. 4 NC State	13	–	5	.722	31	–	7	.816
No. 20 Syracuse	13	–	5	.722	24	–	8	.750
No. 11 Notre Dame †	13	–	5	.722	28	–	7	.800
Louisville	12	–	6	.667	24	–	10	.706
Florida State	12	–	6	.667	23	–	11	.676
No. 17 Duke	11	–	7	.611	22	–	12	.647
North Carolina	11	–	7	.611	20	–	13	.606
Miami (FL)	8	–	10	.444	19	–	12	.613
Georgia Tech	7	–	11	.389	17	–	16	.515
Virginia	7	–	11	.389	16	–	16	.500
Clemson	5	–	13	.278	12	–	19	.387
Boston College	5	–	13	.278	14	–	19	.424
Wake Forest	2	–	16	.111	7	–	25	.219
Pittsburgh	2	–	16	.111	8	–	24	.250
† 2024 ACC tournament winner Rankings from AP poll

The 2023–24 Notre Dame Fighting Irish women's basketball team represented the University of Notre Dame during the 2023–24 NCAA Division I women's basketball season. The Fighting Irish were led by fourth-year head coach Niele Ivey, and played their home games at Purcell Pavilion as members of the Atlantic Coast Conference.

The Fighting Irish started their season ranked tenth in the nation, and opened against sixth-ranked South Carolina in Paris, France. They lost that game 71–100, but then wemt on a nine-game winning streak before conference play began. The streak included an eleven-point win over Illinois, a defeat of twentieth-ranked Tennessee in the ACC–SEC Challenge and a thirty-seven point win over Purdue. The Fighting Irish lost two of their first three conference games to Syracuse and North Carolina, but rebounded by winning their next four in a row. They lost to Syracuse again, this time when Syracuse was ranked twenty-second, before a break in conference play to face rival UConn. Notre Dame prevailed against the eighth-ranked Huskies 82–67. They took that momentum back into conference play, winning three of their next five. The losses were to fifteenth-ranked Louisville and sixth-ranked NC State. From there, Notre Dame closed out conference play with five straight wins, including victories over fifth-ranked Virginia Tech and twenty-second ranked Louisville to end the season.

The Fighting Irish finished the season 28–7 overall and 13–5 in ACC play to finish in a three-way tie for second place. As the fourth seed in the ACC tournament, they earned a bye into the quarterfinals, where they defeated fifth seed Louisville. They defeated first seed Virginia Tech in the semifinals and second seed NC State to win the title. This was their sixth overall title, and their first since 2019. They received the ACC's automatic bid to the NCAA Tournament, marking the third straight time the Fighting Irish qualified for the tournament. As the second seed in the Albany 1 region, they defeated fifteenth seed Kent State in the first round and seventh seed Ole Miss in the second round, before losing to third seed Oregon State in the Sweet Sixteen to end their season.

== Previous season ==
The Fighting Irish finished the season 27–6 overall and 15–3 in ACC play, to finish as conference champions. This was their seventh regular season championship, and their first since 2018–19. As the first seed in the ACC tournament, they defeated eighth seed NC State in the quarterfinals before they lost to fourth seed Louisville in the semifinals. They received an at-large bid to the NCAA tournament and were the third seed in the Greenville 1 Region. They defeated fourteenth seed Southern Utah in the first round and eleventh seed Mississippi State in the second round before losing to second seed Maryland in the Sweet Sixteen to end their season. Their postseason performance was heavily impacted by an injury to Olivia Miles, who was an All-ACC First Team selection.

== Offseason ==
=== Departures ===
Departures
Name	Number	Pos.	Height	Year	Hometown	Reason for departure
Dara Mabrey	1	G	5'7"	Graduate student	Belmar, New Jersey	Graduated
Trinity Cha	2	G	5'5"	Junior	Irvine, California	—
Lauren Zwetzig	20	G	5'9"	Junior	Fort Collins, Colorado	—
Lauren Ebo	33	C	6'4"	Graduate student	Washington, D.C.	Graduated

=== Incoming transfers ===
Incoming transfers
Name	Number	Pos.	Height	Year	Hometown	Previous school
Becky Obinma	10	F	6'2"	Graduate student	Menifee, California	Pepperdine
Anna DeWolfe	13	G	5'8"	Graduate student	Cumberland, Maine	Fordham

=== 2023 recruiting class ===
College recruiting
Name	Hometown	School	Height	Weight	Commit date
Hannah Hidalgo; PG	Haddonfield, New Jersey	Paul VI	5 ft 6 in (1.68 m)	N/A	
Hannah Hidalgo; PG	Recruit ratings: ESPN: (97)				
Cassandre Prosper; F	Montreal, Canada	Cairine Wilson	6 ft 2 in (1.88 m)	N/A	
Cassandre Prosper; F	Recruit ratings: ESPN: (96)				
Emma Risch; G	Melbourne, Florida	Palm Bay Magnet	6 ft 1 in (1.85 m)	N/A	
Emma Risch; G	Recruit ratings: ESPN: (96)				
Overall recruit ranking:
Note: In many cases, Scout, Rivals, 247Sports, On3, and ESPN may conflict in their listings of height and weight.; In these cases, the average was taken. ESPN grades are on a 100-point scale.; Sources:

== Roster ==
2023–24 Notre Dame Fighting Irish women's basketball team
Players
Coaches

Pos.	#	Name	Height	Year	Previous school	Hometown
G	0	Jenna Brown (injured)	5 ft 10 in (1.78 m)	RS Sr	The Lovett School; Stanford	Atlanta, GA
G	2	Emma Risch (injured)	6 ft 1 in (1.85 m)	Fr	Palm Bay Magnet	Melbourne, FL
G	3	Hannah Hidalgo	5 ft 6 in (1.68 m)	Fr	Paul VI	Haddonfield, NJ
G	4	Cassandre Prosper (injured)	6 ft 2 in (1.88 m)	So	Cairine Wilson	Montreal, QC
G	5	Olivia Miles (injured) (redshirt)	5 ft 10 in (1.78 m)	Jr	Blair Academy	Phillipsburg, NJ
F	10	Becky Obinma	6 ft 2 in (1.88 m)	RS Sr	Rosary Academy; TCU; Pepperdine	Menifee, CA
G	11	Sonia Citron	6 ft 1 in (1.85 m)	Jr	The Ursuline School	Eastchester, NY
G	13	Anna DeWolfe	5 ft 8 in (1.73 m)	RS Sr	Greely; Fordham	Cumberland, ME
G	14	KK Bransford	5 ft 11 in (1.8 m)	So	Mount Notre Dame	Cincinnati, OH
F	15	Natalija Marshall	6 ft 5 in (1.96 m)	RS Jr	Christ the King	Queens, NY
F	21	Maddy Westbeld	6 ft 3 in (1.91 m)	RS Jr	Fairmont	Kettering, OH
F	22	Kylee Watson	6 ft 4 in (1.93 m)	RS Jr	Mainland; Oregon	Linwood, NJ
G	25	Sarah Cernugel	5 ft 4 in (1.63 m)	RS Jr	Hinsdale Central	Westmont, IL

Head coach

- Niele Ivey (Notre Dame)

Assistant coach(es)

- Carol Owens (Northern Illinois)
- Michaela Mabrey (Notre Dame)
- Charel Allen (Notre Dame)

Legend

- (C) Team captain
- (S) Suspended
- (I) Ineligible
- (W) Walk-on
- Injured
- Current redshirt

Roster
Last update: November 16, 2023

== Schedule and results ==
Date time, TV	Rank^{#}	Opponent^{#}	Result	Record	Site (attendance) city, state
Exhibition
October 30, 2023*; 7:00 p.m.	No. 10	Purdue Northwest	W 110–48	–	Purcell Pavilion (4,573); Notre Dame, IN
Regular season
November 6, 2023*; 1:00 p.m., ESPN	No. 10	vs. No. 6 South Carolina; Aflac Oui-Play	L 71–100	0–1	Halle Georges Carpentier (3,203); Paris, France
November 12, 2023*; 2:00 p.m., ESPN+	No. 10	at NJIT	W 104–57	1–1	Wellness and Events Center (1,631); Newark, NJ
November 15, 2023*; 7:00 p.m., ACCNX	No. 16	Northwestern	W 110–52	2–1	Purcell Pavilion (7,065); Notre Dame, IN
November 18, 2023*; 1:00 p.m., NBC	No. 16	vs. Illinois; Citi Shamrock Classic	W 79–68	3–1	Entertainment and Sports Arena (N/A); Washington, D.C.
November 21, 2023*; 7:00 p.m., ACCNX	No. 17	Chicago State	W 113–35	4–1	Purcell Pavilion (4,987); Notre Dame, IN
November 24, 2023*; 5:00 p.m., ESPN+	No. 17	at Ball State	W 90–59	5–1	Worthen Arena (5,442); Muncie, IN
November 29, 2023*; 5:00 p.m., ESPN	No. 18	at No. 20 Tennessee; ACC–SEC Challenge	W 74–69	6–1	Thompson–Boling Arena (8,211); Knoxville, TN
December 6, 2023*; 7:00 p.m., ACCNX	No. 14	Lafayette	W 96–42	7–1	Purcell Pavilion (4,745); Notre Dame, IN
December 17, 2023*; 12:00 p.m., ACCN	No. 14	Purdue	W 76–39	8–1	Purcell Pavilion (9,149); Notre Dame, IN
December 21, 2023*; 6:00 p.m., ACCN	No. 14	Western Michigan	W 84–47	9–1	Purcell Pavilion (5,367); Notre Dame, IN
December 31, 2023; 2:00 p.m., ACCN	No. 13	at Syracuse	L 81–86	9–2 (0–1)	JMA Wireless Dome (2,755); Syracuse, NY
January 4, 2024; 6:00 p.m., ACCN	No. 16	at Pittsburgh	W 71–66	10–2 (1–1)	Peterson Events Center (1,285); Pittsburgh, PA
January 7, 2024; 5:00 p.m., ESPN2	No. 16	North Carolina	L 57–61	10–3 (1–2)	Purcell Pavilion (6,418); Notre Dame, IN
January 11, 2024; 7:00 p.m., ACCNX	No. 18	Boston College	W 98–48	11–3 (2–2)	Purcell Pavilion (4,657); Notre Dame, IN
January 14, 2024; 12:00 p.m., The CW	No. 18	Miami (FL)	W 70–59	12–3 (3–2)	Purcell Pavilion (5,905); Notre Dame, IN
January 18, 2024; 7:00 p.m., ACCNX	No. 19	at Virginia	W 86–76	13–3 (4–2)	John Paul Jones Arena (4,152); Charlottesville, VA
January 21, 2024; 2:00 p.m., ACCNX	No. 19	at Wake Forest	W 75–56	14–3 (5–2)	LJVM Coliseum (1,566); Winston-Salem, NC
January 25, 2024; 7:00 p.m., ACCNX	No. 15	No. 22 Syracuse	L 65–79	14–4 (5–3)	Purcell Pavilion (5,512); Notre Dame, IN
January 27, 2024*; 8:00 p.m., FOX	No. 15	at No. 8 UConn; Rivalry	W 82–67	15–4	Harry A. Gampel Pavilion (10,299); Storrs, CT
February 1, 2024; 7:00 p.m., ACCNX	No. 14	at Georgia Tech	W 85–48	16–4 (6–3)	McCamish Pavilion (1,989); Atlanta, GA
February 4, 2024; 2:00 p.m., ACCN	No. 14	Pittsburgh	W 78–53	17–4 (7–3)	Purcell Pavilion (7,170); Notre Dame, IN
February 8, 2024; 6:00 p.m., ESPN	No. 12	at No. 15 Louisville	L 66–73	17–5 (7–4)	KFC Yum! Center (9,417); Louisville, KY
February 11, 2024; 12:00 p.m., ACCN	No. 12	at Florida State	W 98–94 ^{2OT}	18–5 (8–4)	Donald L. Tucker Center (2,643); Tallahassee, FL
February 15, 2024; 6:00 p.m., ACCN	No. 16	No. 6 NC State	L 43–59	18–6 (8–5)	Purcell Pavilion (7,134); Notre Dame, IN
February 19, 2024; 7:00 p.m., ESPN2	No. 19	at Duke	W 70–62	19–6 (9–5)	Cameron Indoor Stadium (2,485); Durham, NC
February 22, 2024; 7:00 p.m., ACCNX	No. 19	Clemson	W 80–62	20–6 (10–5)	Purcell Pavilion (1,554); Notre Dame, IN
February 25, 2024; 12:00 p.m., ACCN	No. 19	at Boston College	W 79–55	21–6 (11–5)	Conte Forum (3,612); Chestnut Hill, MA
February 29, 2024; 7:00 p.m., ESPN	No. 17	No. 5 Virginia Tech	W 71–58	22–6 (12–5)	Purcell Pavilion (6,416); Notre Dame, IN
March 3, 2024; 2:00 p.m., ESPN	No. 17	No. 22 Louisville	W 74–58	23–6 (13–5)	Purcell Pavilion (9,149); Notre Dame, IN
ACC Women's Tournament
March 8, 2024; 11:00 a.m., ACCN	(4) No. 14	vs. (5) No. 24 Louisville; Quarterfinals	W 77–68	24–6	Greensboro Coliseum (15,202); Greensboro, NC
March 9, 2024; 12:00 p.m., ACCN	(4) No. 14	vs. (1) No. 11 Virginia Tech; Semifinals	W 82–53	25–6	Greensboro Coliseum (10,488); Greensboro, NC
March 10, 2024; 1:00 p.m., ESPN	(4) No. 14	vs. (2) No. 10 NC State; Finals	W 55–51	26–6	Greensboro Coliseum (9,102); Greensboro, NC
NCAA Women's Tournament
March 23, 2024*; 2:15 p.m., ESPN	(2 A1) No. 9	(15 A1) Kent State; First Round	W 81–67	27–6	Purcell Pavilion (9,149); Notre Dame, IN
March 25, 2024*; 2:00 p.m., ESPN	(2 A1) No. 9	(7 A1) Ole Miss; Second Round	W 71–56	28–6	Purcell Pavilion (7,882); Notre Dame, IN
March 29, 2024*; 2:30 p.m., ESPN	(2 A1) No. 9	vs. (3 A1) No. 12 Oregon State; Sweet Sixteen	L 65–70	28–7	MVP Arena (13,597); Albany, NY
*Non-conference game. ^{#}Rankings from AP Poll. (#) Tournament seedings in parentheses. A1=Albany 1. All times are in Eastern.

== Rankings ==
+ Regular season polls	Poll	Pre- season	Week 2	Week 3	Week 4	Week 5	Week 6	Week 7	Week 8	Week 9	Week 10	Week 11	Week 12	Week 13	Week 14	Week 15	Week 16	Week 17	Week 18	Week 19	Week 20	Final
AP	10	16	17	18	14	14	14	13	16	18	19	15	14	12	16	19	17	14	9	9	11	
Coaches	10	14	14	14	12	12	12	12	17	19	19	18	16	14	17	18	17	14	10	10	11	

Legend
	Increase in ranking
	Decrease in ranking
	Not ranked previous week
(RV)	Received votes
