= 2023–24 Virginia Tech Hokies women's basketball team =

Intercollegiate basketball season

2023–24 Virginia Tech Hokies women's basketball

ACC regular season champions

NCAA tournament, Second Round
- Conference: Atlantic Coast Conference

Ranking
- Coaches: No. 17
- AP: No. 18
- Record: 25–8 (14–4 ACC)
- Head coach: Kenny Brooks (8th season)
- Assistant coaches: Lindsey Hicks; Radvile Autukaite
- Home arena: Cassell Coliseum

2023–24 ACC women's basketball standings
	Conf.				Overall
Team	W		L	PCT	W		L	PCT
No. 18 Virginia Tech	14	–	4	.778	25	–	8	.758
No. 4 NC State	13	–	5	.722	31	–	7	.816
No. 20 Syracuse	13	–	5	.722	24	–	8	.750
No. 11 Notre Dame †	13	–	5	.722	28	–	7	.800
Louisville	12	–	6	.667	24	–	10	.706
Florida State	12	–	6	.667	23	–	11	.676
No. 17 Duke	11	–	7	.611	22	–	12	.647
North Carolina	11	–	7	.611	20	–	13	.606
Miami (FL)	8	–	10	.444	19	–	12	.613
Georgia Tech	7	–	11	.389	17	–	16	.515
Virginia	7	–	11	.389	16	–	16	.500
Clemson	5	–	13	.278	12	–	19	.387
Boston College	5	–	13	.278	14	–	19	.424
Wake Forest	2	–	16	.111	7	–	25	.219
Pittsburgh	2	–	16	.111	8	–	24	.250
† 2024 ACC tournament winner Rankings from AP poll

The 2023–24 Virginia Tech Hokies women's basketball team represented Virginia Polytechnic Institute and State University during the 2023–24 NCAA Division I women's basketball season. The Hokies were led by eighth-year head coach Kenny Brooks and played their home games at Cassell Coliseum as members of the Atlantic Coast Conference.

The Hokies started the season ranked number 8 and with a win against High Point before a matchup with number 3 Iowa. The game was a close one, but the Hokies fell 76–80. They went off a four game winning streak and were Cayman Islands Classic champions. Their only other non-conference loss came at number 7 LSU in the ACC–SEC Challenge. The Hokies finished their non-conference regular season 9–2. They opened the ACC regular season with four straight wins, including over number 3 NC State. The Hokies then went on a two game losing streak before winning their next ten straight games. Their ten game winning streak included wins over number 22 Syracuse, number 24 North Carolina, number 3 NC State, and number 18 Louisville. They reached their season high in the rankings, number 5, before losing their last two games to number 17 Notre Dame and their rivalry game against Virginia. After the season, Elizabeth Kitley was named ACC player of the year, for the third year in a row.

The Hokies finished the season 25–8 overall and 14–4 in ACC play to finish as regular season champions. As the first seed in the ACC tournament, they earned a bye into the Quarterfinals where they defeated ninth seed Miami before losing to eventual champions Notre Dame. They received an at-large invitation to the NCAA Tournament, marking the fourth straight time the Hokies qualified for the tournament. As the fourth seed in the Portland 3 they defeated thirteenth seed Marshall in the First Round before losing to fifth seed Baylor in the Second Round to end their season. After the loss, head coach Kenny Brooks announced that he was stepping down from the team in order to accept the head coaching position at Kentucky.

== Previous season ==
The Hokies finished the season 31–5 overall and 14–4 in ACC play to finish in a tie for second place. As the third seed in the ACC tournament, they defeated sixth seed Miami in the Quarterfinals, second seed Duke in the Semifinals and fourth seed Louisville in the Final to win the title. The ACC Tournament title was the first in program history. They received an automatic bid to the NCAA tournament where they were the first seed in the Seattle 3. They defeated sixteenth seed Chattanooga in the First Round, ninth seed South Dakota State in the Second Round, fourth seed Tennessee in the Sweet 16 and third seed Ohio State in the Elite Eight. In the Final Four they could not overcome third seed LSU, losing 72–79 to end their season. The Hokies' trips to the Elite Eight and Final Four were the first such trips in program history.

== Off-season ==
=== Departures ===
Departures
Name	Number	Pos.	Height	Year	Hometown	Reason for departure
Chloe Brooks	3	G	5'10"	(redshirt) Senior	Harrisonburg, Virginia	Graduated
Charlise Dunn	10	G	6'2"	Freshman	Victoria, Australia	Transferred to Davidson
D'asia Gregg	11	F	6'2"	Senior	Florence, South Carolina	Graduated
Taylor Soule	13	F	5'11"	Graduate Student	West Lebanon, New Hampshire	Graduated; Drafted 28th overall in the 2023 WNBA draft
Maddie Vejsicky	14	G	6'0"	Freshman	Newark, Ohio	Transferred to San Diego
Ashley Owusu	15	G	6'0"	Senior	Woodbridge, Virginia	Transferred to Penn State
Kayana Traylor	23	G	5'9"	Senior	Martinsville, Indiana	Graduated; Drafted 23rd overall in the 2023 WNBA draft
Clara Ford	32	C	6'3"	Graduate Student	Vienna, Virginia	Graduated
Taylor Geiman	35	G/F	6'0"	Senior	Hanover, Pennsylvania	Graduated

=== Incoming transfers ===
Incoming transfers
Name	Number	Pos.	Height	Year	Hometown	Previous school
Rose Micheaux	4	F	6'2"	Junior	Wayne, Michigan	Minnesota
Matilda Ekh	11	G/F	6'0"	Junior	Västerås, Sweden	Michigan State
Olivia Summiel	20	G/F	6'2"	Graduate Student	Dayville, Connecticut	Wake Forest

=== Recruiting class ===
College recruiting
Name	Hometown	School	Height	Weight	Commit date
Carys Baker; F	West Hartford, Connecticut	Loomis Chaffee	6 ft 1 in (1.85 m)	N/A	
Carys Baker; F	Recruit ratings: ESPN: (93)				
Mackenzie Nelson; PG	Greenwich, Connecticut	St. Luke's	5 ft 8 in (1.73 m)	N/A	
Mackenzie Nelson; PG	Recruit ratings: ESPN: (93)				
Samyah Suffren; PG	Charlotte, North Carolina	Cannon School	5 ft 8 in (1.73 m)	N/A	
Samyah Suffren; PG	Recruit ratings: ESPN: (93)				
Clara Strack; F	Buffalo, New York	Hamburg	6 ft 4 in (1.93 m)	N/A	
Clara Strack; F	Recruit ratings: ESPN: (91)				
Gabby Brooks; G	Harrisonburg, Virginia	Blacksburg	5 ft 10 in (1.78 m)	N/A	
Gabby Brooks; G	Recruit ratings: No ratings found				
Overall recruit ranking:
Note: In many cases, Scout, Rivals, 247Sports, On3, and ESPN may conflict in their listings of height and weight.; In these cases, the average was taken. ESPN grades are on a 100-point scale.; Sources:

== Roster ==
2023–24 Virginia Tech Hokies women's basketball team
Players
Coaches

Pos.	#	Name	Height	Year	Previous school	Hometown
G	1	Carleigh Wenzel	6 ft 0 in (1.83 m)	RS Fr	Antonian College Prep	San Antonio, TX
G	2	Gabby Brooks	5 ft 10 in (1.78 m)	Fr	Blacksburg	Harrisonburg, VA
G	3	Mackenzie Nelson	5 ft 8 in (1.73 m)	Fr	St. Luke's	Greenwich, CT
F	4	Rose Micheaux	6 ft 3 in (1.91 m)	Jr	Wayne Memorial; Minnesota	Wayne, MI
G	5	Georgia Amoore	5 ft 5 in (1.65 m)	Sr	Loreto College	Ballarat, Australia
F	10	Carys Baker	6 ft 2 in (1.88 m)	Fr	Loomis Chaffee	West Hartford, CT
G/F	11	Matilda Ekh	6 ft 0 in (1.83 m)	Jr	Riksbasketgymnasiet Luleå; Michigan State	Västerås, Sweden
G	12	Samyah Suffren	5 ft 8 in (1.73 m)	Fr	Cannon School	Charlotte, NC
C	13	Clara Strack	6 ft 5 in (1.96 m)	Fr	Hamburg	Buffalo, NY
G/F	20	Olivia Summiel	6 ft 2 in (1.88 m)	GS	Marianapolis Prep; Wake Forest	Dayville, CT
C	22	Cayla King	6 ft 0 in (1.83 m)	GS	Northwest Guilford	Greensboro, NC
C	33	Elizabeth Kitley	6 ft 6 in (1.98 m)	Sr	Northwest Guilford	Summerfield, NC

Head coach

- Kenny Brooks (James Madison)

Assistant coach(es)

- Lindsey Hicks (Purdue)
- Radvile Autukaite (Reinhardt)
- Jauwan Scaife (Ball State)

Legend

- (C) Team captain
- (S) Suspended
- (I) Ineligible
- (W) Walk-on
- Injured
- Current redshirt

Roster

== Schedule ==
Date time, TV	Rank^{#}	Opponent^{#}	Result	Record	Site (attendance) city, state
Non-conference regular season
November 6, 2023*; 5:00 p.m., ACCN	No. 8	High Point	W 94–55	1–0	Cassell Coliseum (6,113); Blacksburg, VA
November 9, 2023*; 8:00 p.m., ESPN2	No. 8	vs. No. 3 Iowa; Ally Tipoff	L 76–80	1–1	Spectrum Center (15,196); Charlotte, NC
November 16, 2023*; 6:00 p.m., ACCNX	No. 9	Houston Christian	W 105–36	2–1	Cassell Coliseum (4,226); Blacksburg, VA
November 20, 2023*; 6:00 p.m., ACCNX	No. 9	UNC Greensboro	W 72–51	3–1	Cassell Coliseum (4,154); Blacksburg, VA
November 24, 2023*; 5:00 p.m., FloHoops	No. 9	vs. Kansas; Cayman Islands Classic	W 59–58	4–1	John Gray Gymnasium (1,100); George Town, Cayman Islands
November 25, 2023*; 11:00 a.m., FloHoops	No. 9	vs. Tulane; Cayman Islands Classic	W 76–70	5–1	John Gray Gymnasium (500); George Town, Cayman Islands
November 30, 2023*; 9:00 p.m., ESPN	No. 9	at No. 7 LSU; ACC–SEC Challenge	L 64–82	5–2	Pete Maravich Assembly Center (10,790); Baton Rouge, LA
December 6, 2023*; 6:00 p.m., ACCNX	No. 15	LIU	W 98–50	6–2	Cassell Coliseum (3,849); Blacksburg, VA
December 10, 2023*; 2:00 p.m., ACCNX	No. 15	Radford	W 85–40	7–2	Cassell Coliseum (5,062); Blacksburg, VA
December 17, 2023*; 5:30 p.m., FS1	No. 16	at Rutgers	W 84–59	8–2	Jersey Mike's Arena (4,731); Piscataway, NJ
December 21, 2023*; 2:00 p.m., ACCNX	No. 15	William & Mary	W 76–43	9–2	Cassell Coliseum (4,887); Blacksburg, VA
ACC regular season
December 31, 2023; 2:00 p.m., ACCNX	No. 14	Pittsburgh	W 91–41	10–2 (1–0)	Cassell Coliseum (6,078); Blacksburg, VA
January 4, 2024; 6:00 p.m., ACCNX	No. 13	at Wake Forest	W 82–73	11–2 (2–0)	LJVM Coliseum (1,303); Winston-Salem, NC
January 7, 2024; 12:00 p.m., ACCN	No. 13	No. 3 NC State	W 63–62	12–2 (3–0)	Cassell Coliseum (8,925); Blacksburg, VA
January 11, 2024; 8:00 p.m., ACCN	No. 11	Miami (FL)	W 76–52	13–2 (4–0)	Cassell Coliseum (4,672); Blacksburg, VA
January 14, 2024; 1:00 p.m., ESPN	No. 11	at No. 21 Florida State	L 81–89	13–3 (4–1)	Donald L. Tucker Center (3,044); Tallahassee, FL
January 18, 2024; 8:00 p.m., ACCN	No. 14	at Duke	L 46–63	13–4 (4–2)	Cameron Indoor Stadium (2,217); Durham, NC
January 21, 2024; 12:00 p.m., The CW	No. 14	Clemson	W 74–62	14–4 (5–2)	Cassell Coliseum (6,427); Blacksburg, VA
January 25, 2024; 6:00 p.m., ACCNX	No. 19	Georgia Tech	W 87–69	15–4 (6–2)	Cassell Coliseum (4,971); Blacksburg, VA
January 28, 2024; 12:00 p.m., ACCN	No. 19	at No. 22 Syracuse	W 75–62	16–4 (7–2)	JMA Wireless Dome (6,003); Syracuse, NY
February 1, 2024; 6:00 p.m., ACCN	No. 17	Virginia; Rivalry	W 76–63	17–4 (8–2)	Cassell Coliseum (8,925); Blacksburg, VA
February 4, 2024; 12:00 p.m., ESPN2	No. 17	at No. 24 North Carolina	W 70–61 ^{OT}	18–4 (9–2)	Carmichael Arena (5,618); Chapel Hill, NC
February 8, 2024; 8:00 p.m., ACCN	No. 16	at No. 3 NC State	W 72–61	19–4 (10–2)	Reynolds Coliseum (5,500); Raleigh, NC
February 11, 2024; 1:00 p.m., ACCNX	No. 16	Boston College	W 74–63	20–4 (11–2)	Cassell Coliseum (8,925); Blacksburg, VA
February 15, 2024; 8:00 p.m., ACCN	No. 12	Duke	W 61–56	21–4 (12–2)	Cassell Coliseum (8,925); Blacksburg, VA
February 18, 2024; 1:00 p.m., ESPN	No. 12	at No. 18 Louisville	W 86–70	22–4 (13–2)	KFC Yum! Center (12,249); Louisville, KY
February 25, 2024; 2:00 p.m., ACCN	No. 8	North Carolina	W 74–62	23–4 (14–2)	Cassell Coliseum (8,925); Blacksburg, VA
February 29, 2024; 7:00 p.m., ESPN	No. 5	at No. 17 Notre Dame	L 58–71	23–5 (14–3)	Purcell Pavilion (6,416); Notre Dame, IN
March 3, 2024; 6:00 p.m., ACCN	No. 5	at Virginia; Rivalry	L 75–80	23–6 (14–4)	John Paul Jones Arena (11,975); Charlottesville, VA
ACC tournament
March 8, 2024; 1:30 p.m., ACCN	(1) No. 11	vs. (9) Miami (FL); Quarterfinals	W 55–47	24–6	Greensboro Coliseum (15,202); Greensboro, NC
March 9, 2024; 12:00 p.m., ACCN	(1) No. 11	vs. (4) No. 14 Notre Dame; Semifinals	L 53–82	24–7	Greensboro Coliseum (10,488); Greensboro, NC
NCAA tournament
March 22, 2024*; 3:30 p.m., ESPN2	(4 P3) No. 13	(13 P3) Marshall; First Round	W 92–49	25–7	Cassell Coliseum (8,925); Blacksburg, VA
March 24, 2024*; 8:00 p.m., ESPN	(4 P3) No. 13	(5 P3) No. 19 Baylor; Second Round	L 72–75	25–8	Cassell Coliseum (8,925); Blacksburg, VA
*Non-conference game. ^{#}Rankings from AP Poll. (#) Tournament seedings in parentheses. P3=Portland 3. All times are in Eastern.

== Rankings ==
+ Regular season polls	Poll	Pre- Season	Week 2	Week 3	Week 4	Week 5	Week 6	Week 7	Week 8	Week 9	Week 10	Week 11	Week 12	Week 13	Week 14	Week 15	Week 16	Week 17	Week 18	Week 19	Week 20	Final
AP	8	9	9	9	15	16	15	14	13	11	14	19	17	16	12	8	5	11	13	13	18	
Coaches	5	9	9	9	13	14	14	14	11	11	14	19	18	18	13	8	4	11	13	12	17	

Legend
	Increase in ranking
	Decrease in ranking
	Not ranked previous week
(RV)	Received Votes

== 2024 WNBA draft ==
Player	Team	Round	Pick #	Position
(United States) Elizabeth Kitley	Las Vegas Aces	2	24	C

== See also ==
- 2023–24 Virginia Tech Hokies men's basketball team
