= 2023–24 LSU Tigers women's basketball team =

Intercollegiate basketball season

2023–24 LSU Tigers women's basketball

NCAA tournament, Elite Eight
- Conference: Southeastern Conference

Ranking
- Coaches: No. 7
- AP: No. 6
- Record: 31–6 (13–3 SEC)
- Head coach: Kim Mulkey (3rd season)
- Assistant coaches: Bob Starkey; Daphne Mitchell; Gary Redus II; Kaylin Rice; Joe Schwartz
- Home arena: Pete Maravich Assembly Center

2023–24 SEC women's basketball standings
	Conf.				Overall
Team	W		L	PCT	W		L	PCT
No. 1 South Carolina †	16	–	0	1.000	38	–	0	1.000
No. 6 LSU	13	–	3	.813	31	–	6	.838
Ole Miss	12	–	4	.750	24	–	9	.727
Alabama	10	–	6	.625	24	–	10	.706
Tennessee	10	–	6	.625	20	–	13	.606
Vanderbilt	9	–	7	.563	23	–	10	.697
Mississippi State	8	–	8	.500	23	–	12	.657
Auburn	8	–	8	.500	20	–	12	.625
Texas A&M	6	–	10	.375	19	–	13	.594
Arkansas	6	–	10	.375	18	–	15	.545
Florida	5	–	11	.313	16	–	16	.500
Kentucky	4	–	12	.250	12	–	20	.375
Georgia	3	–	13	.188	12	–	18	.400
Missouri	2	–	14	.125	11	–	19	.367
† 2024 SEC tournament winner Rankings from AP poll

The 2023–24 LSU Tigers women's basketball team represented Louisiana State University during the 2023–24 NCAA Division I women's basketball season. The Tigers were led by third-year head coach Kim Mulkey, and played their home games at Pete Maravich Assembly Center and competed as members of the Southeastern Conference (SEC).

== Previous season ==
The Tigers finished the season 34–2 (15–1 SEC) to finish in second in the SEC. The Tigers won the NCAA tournament, 102–85, against Iowa. The championship was the first in program history and Kim Mulkey's fourth championship as a head coach.

== Offseason ==
=== Departures ===
LSU Departures
Name	Number	Pos.	Height	Year	Hometown	Notes	Ref
LaDazhia Williams	0	F	6'4"	Graduate Student	Bradenton, FL	Graduated	
Jasmine Carson	2	G	5'10"	Graduate Student	Memphis, TN	Graduated	
Emily Ward	11	F	5'11"	Senior	Bossier City, LA	Graduated	
Alisa Williams	15	F	6'2"	Freshman	Denton, TX	Transferred to Iowa State	
Alexis Morris	45	G	5'6"	Senior	Beaumont, TX	Graduated	

=== 2023 recruiting class ===
College recruiting information
Name	Hometown	School	Height	Weight	Commit date
Mikaylah Williams; G	Bossier City, LA	Parkway HS	6 ft 0 in (1.83 m)	N/A	
Mikaylah Williams; G	Recruit ratings: ESPN: (98)				
Aalyah Del Rosario; C	The Bronx, NY	The Webb School	6 ft 6 in (1.98 m)	N/A	
Aalyah Del Rosario; C	Recruit ratings: ESPN: (97)				
Angelica Velez; G	The Bronx, NY	The Webb School	5 ft 7 in (1.70 m)	N/A	
Angelica Velez; G	Recruit ratings: ESPN: (94)				
Janae Kent; G	Oak Forest, IL	Oak Forest HS	6 ft 1 in (1.85 m)	N/A	
Janae Kent; G	Recruit ratings: ESPN: (93)				
Overall recruit ranking:
Note: In many cases, Scout, Rivals, 247Sports, On3, and ESPN may conflict in their listings of height and weight.; In these cases, the average was taken. ESPN grades are on a 100-point scale.; Sources:

=== Incoming transfers ===
LSU incoming transfers
Name	Number	Pos.	Height	Year	Hometown	Previous school
Hailey Van Lith	11	G	5'7"	Senior	Wenatchee, WA	Louisville
Aneesah Morrow	24	G	6'1"	Junior	Chicago, IL	DePaul

== Roster ==
2023–24 LSU Tigers women's basketball team
Players
Coaches

Pos.	#	Name	Height	Year	Previous school	Hometown
G	1	Angelica Velez	5 ft 7 in (1.7 m)	Fr	The Webb School	The Bronx, NY (United States) (New York (state))
F	2	Amani Bartlett	6 ft 3 in (1.91 m)	Jr	Houston Christian HS	Cleveland, TX (United States) (Texas)
G	4	Flau'jae Johnson	5 ft 10 in (1.78 m)	So	Sprayberry HS	Savannah, GA (United States) (Georgia (U.S. state))
F	5	Sa'Myah Smith	6 ft 2 in (1.88 m)	So	DeSoto HS	DeSoto, TX (United States) (Texas)
F	10	Angel Reese	6 ft 3 in (1.91 m)	Sr	Saint Frances Academy; Maryland	Baltimore, MD (United States) (Maryland)
G	11	Hailey Van Lith	5 ft 7 in (1.7 m)	Sr	Cashmere HS; Louisville	Wenatchee, WA (United States) (Washington (state))
G	12	Mikaylah Williams	6 ft 0 in (1.83 m)	Fr	Parkway HS	Bossier City, LA (United States) (Louisiana)
G	13	Last-Tear Poa	5 ft 11 in (1.8 m)	Jr	UC Senior Secondary College Lake Ginninderra; Northwest Florida State College	Melbourne, Australia (Victoria (state))
G	14	Izzy Besselman	5 ft 10 in (1.78 m)	So	Episcopal School	Baton Rouge, LA (United States) (Louisiana)
G	20	Janae Kent	6 ft 1 in (1.85 m)	Fr	Oak Forest HS	Oak Forest, IL (United States) (Illinois)
C	23	Aalyah Del Rosario	6 ft 6 in (1.98 m)	Fr	The Webb School	The Bronx, NY (United States) (New York (state))
G	24	Aneesah Morrow	6 ft 1 in (1.85 m)	Jr	Simeon Career Academy; DePaul	Chicago, IL (United States) (Illinois)

Head coach

- Kim Mulkey (Louisiana Tech)

Assistant coach(es)

- Bob Starkey
- Daphne Mitchell (Georgia Tech)
- Gary Redus II (South Alabama)
- Kaylin Rice (Baylor)
- Joe Schwartz (Texas)

Legend

- (C) Team captain
- (S) Suspended
- (I) Ineligible
- (W) Walk-on
- Injured
- Current redshirt

Roster

== Schedule and results ==
Date time, TV	Rank^{#}	Opponent^{#}	Result	Record	High points	High rebounds	High assists	Site (attendance) city, state
Exhibition
October 26, 2023*; 7:00 p.m., SECN+	No. 1	East Texas Baptist	W 99–26		18 – Johnson	12 – Smith	3 – Tied	Pete Maravich Assembly Center (1,771); Baton Rouge, LA
November 1, 2023*; 7:00 p.m., SECN+	No. 1	Loyola New Orleans	W 121–36		20 – Williams	14 – Smith	6 – Poole	Pete Maravich Assembly Center (1,605); Baton Rouge, LA
Non-conference regular season
November 6, 2023*; 6:30 p.m., TNT	No. 1	vs. No. 20 Colorado; Naismith Hall of Fame Series	L 78–92	0–1	17 – Williams	12 – Reese	7 – Van Lith	T-Mobile Arena; Paradise, NV
November 9, 2023*; 7:00 p.m., SECN+	No. 1	Queens	W 112–55	1–1	28 – Reese	14 – Reese	5 – Poa	Pete Maravich Assembly Center (10,371); Baton Rouge, LA
November 12, 2023*; 2:00 p.m., SECN+	No. 1	Mississippi Valley State	W 109–47	2–1	21 – Smith	11 – Smith	6 – Van Lith	Pete Maravich Assembly Center (10,720); Baton Rouge, LA
November 14, 2023*; 11:00 a.m., SECN+	No. 7	Kent State	W 109–79	3–1	42 – Williams	11 – Smith	5 – Van Lith	Pete Maravich Assembly Center (9,117); Baton Rouge, LA
November 17, 2023*; 7:00 p.m., ESPN+	No. 7	at Southeastern Louisiana	W 73–50	4–1	17 – Johnson	10 – Morrow	3 – Tied	Pride Roofing University Center (7,500); Hammond, LA
November 20, 2023*; 7:00 p.m., SECN+	No. 7	Texas Southern	W 106–47	5–1	17 – Johnson	8 – Johnson	5 – Van Lith	Pete Maravich Assembly Center (10,787); Baton Rouge, LA
November 24, 2023*; 12:30 p.m., FloHoops	No. 7	vs. Niagara; Cayman Islands Classic	W 99–65	6–1	28 – Morrow	10 – Morrow	7 – Van Lith	John Gray Gymnasium (300); George Town, Cayman Islands
November 25, 2023*; 4:00 p.m., FloHoops	No. 7	vs. Virginia; Cayman Islands Classic	W 76–73	7–1	37 – Morrow	16 – Morrow	5 – Tied	John Gray Gymnasium (1,650); George Town, Cayman Islands
November 30, 2023*; 8:00 p.m., ESPN	No. 7т	No. 9 Virginia Tech; ACC–SEC Challenge	W 82–64	8–1	20 – Williams	15 – Morrow	5 – Williams	Pete Maravich Assembly Center (10,790); Baton Rouge, LA
December 10, 2023*; 2:00 p.m., SECN+	No. 7	Louisiana	W 83–53	9–1	27 – Morrow	11 – Williams	7 – Poa	Pete Maravich Assembly Center (10,794); Baton Rouge, LA
December 12, 2023*; 7:00 p.m., SECN+	No. 7	McNeese	W 133–44	10–1	27 – Del Rosario	11 – Reese	6 – Williams	Pete Maravich Assembly Center (10,653); Baton Rouge, LA
December 17, 2023*; 2:00 p.m., SECN	No. 7	Northwestern State	W 81–36	11–1	25 – Reese	14 – Tied	5 – Johnson	Pete Maravich Assembly Center (11,432); Baton Rouge, LA
December 20, 2023*; 5:00 p.m., ESPN+	No. 7	at Coppin State	W 80–48	12–1	26 – Reese	13 – Morrow	8 – Poa	Physical Education Complex (4,100); Baltimore, MD
December 30, 2023*; 7:00 p.m., SECN+	No. 7	Jacksonville	W 110–68	13–1	20 – Tied	20 – Reese	7 – Poa	Pete Maravich Assembly Center (12,347); Baton Rouge, LA
SEC regular season
January 4, 2024; 8:00 p.m., SECN	No. 7	Missouri	W 92–72	14–1 (1–0)	25 – Morrow	13 – Reese	7 – Williams	Pete Maravich Assembly Center (11,286); Baton Rouge, LA
January 7, 2024; 2:00 p.m., SECN	No. 7	at Ole Miss	W 84–73	15–1 (2–0)	21 – Reese	9 – Reese	4 – Tied	SJB Pavilion (9,074); Oxford, MS
January 11, 2024; 7:00 p.m., SECN+	No. 7	Texas A&M	W 87–70	16–1 (3–0)	21 – Morrow	18 – Reese	7 – Reese	Pete Maravich Assembly Center (11,536); Baton Rouge, LA
January 14, 2024; 2:00 p.m., ESPN	No. 7	at Auburn	L 62–67	16–2 (3–1)	24 – Reese	15 – Morrow	5 – Williams	Neville Arena (7,720); Auburn, AL
January 18, 2024; 8:00 p.m., SECN	No. 10	at Alabama	W 78–58	17–2 (4–1)	20 – Tied	17 – Reese	4 – Van Lith	Coleman Coliseum (5,575); Tuscaloosa, AL
January 21, 2024; 4:00 p.m., ESPN	No. 10	Arkansas	W 99–68	18–2 (5–1)	21 – Williams	17 – Reese	6 – Van Lith	Pete Maravich Assembly Center (12,873); Baton Rouge, LA
January 25, 2024; 7:00 p.m., ESPN	No. 9	No. 1 South Carolina; College GameDay	L 70–76	18–3 (5–2)	16 – Morrow	10 – Morrow	6 – Williams	Pete Maravich Assembly Center (13,205); Baton Rouge, LA
January 29, 2024; 6:00 p.m., ESPN2	No. 9	at Mississippi State	L 73–77	18–4 (5–3)	20 – Reese	18 – Reese	3 – Tied	Humphrey Coliseum (9,121); Starkville, MS
February 4, 2024; 1:00 p.m., SECN	No. 9	Florida	W 106–66	19–4 (6–3)	21 – Williams	20 – Morrow	6 – Reese	Pete Maravich Assembly Center (12,707); Baton Rouge, LA
February 8, 2024; 8:00 p.m., SECN	No. 13	at Vanderbilt	W 85–62	20–4 (7–3)	17 – Johnson	16 – Reese	2 – Tied	Memorial Gymnasium (6,354); Nashville, TN
February 11, 2024; 3:00 p.m., ESPN2	No. 13	Alabama	W 85–66	21–4 (8–3)	27 – Reese	19 – Reese	6 – Reese	Pete Maravich Assembly Center (12,228); Baton Rouge, LA
February 19, 2024; 6:00 p.m., SECN	No. 13	at Texas A&M	W 81–58	22–4 (9–3)	25 – Morrow	15 – Morrow	6 – Johnson	Reed Arena (6,908); College Station, TX
February 22, 2024; 8:00 p.m., SECN	No. 13	Auburn	W 71–66	23–4 (10–3)	25 – Reese	20 – Reese	4 – Van Lith	Pete Maravich Assembly Center (11,453); Baton Rouge, LA
February 25, 2024; 11:00 a.m., ESPN	No. 13	at Tennessee	W 75–60	24–4 (11–3)	26 – Van Lith	15 – Reese	5 – Williams	Thompson–Boling Arena (15,261); Knoxville, TN
February 29, 2024; 8:00 p.m., ESPN2	No. 9	at Georgia	W 80–54	25–4 (12–3)	18 – Van Lith	15 – Reese	5 – Morrow	Stegeman Coliseum (7,406); Athens, GA
March 3, 2024; 1:00 p.m., SECN	No. 9	Kentucky	W 77–56	26–4 (13–3)	22 – Reese	14 – Reese	6 – Poa	Pete Maravich Assembly Center (13,044); Baton Rouge, LA
SEC Tournament
March 8, 2024; 5:00 p.m., SECN	(2) No. 8	vs. (7) Auburn; Quarterfinals	W 78–48	27–4	25 – Johnson	11 – Reese	3 – Reese	Bon Secours Wellness Arena (8,377); Greenville, SC
March 9, 2024; 6:00 p.m., ESPNU	(2) No. 8	vs. (3) Ole Miss; Semifinals	W 75–67	28–4	21 – Tied	17 – Reese	4 – Tied	Bon Secours Wellness Arena (12,784); Greenville, SC
March 10, 2024; 2:00 p.m., ESPN	(2) No. 8	vs. (1) No. 1 South Carolina; Championship	L 72–79	28–5	19 – Morrow	13 – Reese	3 – Van Lith	Bon Secours Wellness Arena (13,163); Greenville, SC
NCAA Tournament
March 22, 2024*; 3:00 p.m., ESPN	(3 A2) No. 8	(14 A2) Rice; First round	W 70–60	29–5	15 – Morrow	19 – Reese	4 – Johnson	Pete Maravich Assembly Center (12,957); Baton Rouge, LA
March 24, 2024*; 2:00 p.m., ABC	(3 A2) No. 8	(11 A2) Middle Tennessee; Second round	W 83–56	30–5	21 – Johnson	13 – Morrow	5 – Poa	Pete Maravich Assembly Center (12,632); Baton Rouge, LA
March 30, 2024*; 12:00 p.m., ABC	(3 A2) No. 8	vs. (2 A2) No. 6 UCLA; Sweet Sixteen	W 78–69	31–5	24 – Johnson	12 – Johnson	5 – Van Lith	MVP Arena; Albany, NY
April 1, 2024*; 6:15 p.m., ESPN	(3 A2) No. 8	vs. (1 A2) No. 2 Iowa; Elite Eight	L 87–94	31–6	23 – Johnson	20 – Reese	4 – Reese	MVP Arena; Albany, NY
*Non-conference game. ^{#}Rankings from AP Poll. (#) Tournament seedings in parentheses. A2=Albany 2. All times are in Central Time.

== Rankings ==
Ranking movements Legend: ██ Increase in ranking ██ Decrease in ranking т = Tied with team above or below ( ) = First-place votes
	Week																				
Poll	Pre	1	2	3	4	5	6	7	8	9	10	11	12	13	14	15	16	17	18	19	Final
AP	1 (35)	7	7	7т	7	7	7	7	7	7	10	9	9	13	13	13	9	8	8	8	6
Coaches	1 (29)	5	5	5	4	6	6	6	5	4	9	9	11	12	11	10	7	5	6	6	7

== See also ==
- 2023–24 LSU Tigers men's basketball team
