= Hunter High School (disambiguation) =

Hunter High School is a high school in West Valley City, Utah, United States.

Hunter High School may also refer to:

- Hunter High School, East Kilbride, Scotland
- Hunter College High School, New York City

== See also ==
- Clifton Hunter High School, Cayman Islands
- Manhattan/Hunter College High School for Sciences, New York City
