= 2023–24 Louisville Cardinals women's basketball team =

Intercollegiate basketball season

2023–24 Louisville Cardinals women's basketball

NCAA tournament, First Round
- Conference: Atlantic Coast Conference
- Record: 24–10 (12–6 ACC)
- Head coach: Jeff Walz (17th season)
- Assistant coaches: Stephanie Norman; Jonneshia Pineda; Shay Robinson
- Home arena: KFC Yum! Center

2023–24 ACC women's basketball standings
	Conf.				Overall
Team	W		L	PCT	W		L	PCT
No. 18 Virginia Tech	14	–	4	.778	25	–	8	.758
No. 4 NC State	13	–	5	.722	31	–	7	.816
No. 20 Syracuse	13	–	5	.722	24	–	8	.750
No. 11 Notre Dame †	13	–	5	.722	28	–	7	.800
Louisville	12	–	6	.667	24	–	10	.706
Florida State	12	–	6	.667	23	–	11	.676
No. 17 Duke	11	–	7	.611	22	–	12	.647
North Carolina	11	–	7	.611	20	–	13	.606
Miami (FL)	8	–	10	.444	19	–	12	.613
Georgia Tech	7	–	11	.389	17	–	16	.515
Virginia	7	–	11	.389	16	–	16	.500
Clemson	5	–	13	.278	12	–	19	.387
Boston College	5	–	13	.278	14	–	19	.424
Wake Forest	2	–	16	.111	7	–	25	.219
Pittsburgh	2	–	16	.111	8	–	24	.250
† 2024 ACC tournament winner Rankings from AP poll

The 2023–24 Louisville Cardinals women's basketball team represented the University of Louisville during the 2023–24 NCAA Division I women's basketball season. The Cardinals were led by seventeenth-year head coach Jeff Walz, and played their home games at the KFC Yum! Center. This season was their tenth year competing in the Atlantic Coast Conference.

The Cardinals started the season ranked seventeenth in the nation and won their first four games of the season before losing to Alabama. After the loss, they went on a six-game win streak that included wins over number 19 Ole Miss in the ACC–SEC Challenge and over rivals Kentucky. Their non-conference season concluded with a loss at number 17 Connecticut and a win over number 23 Washington. The Cardinals finished the non-conference season 11–2. Louisville started the ACC season with five straight wins to reach their highest ranking of thirteenth. However, they lost at number 23 North Carolina before winning three more games. In their final nine games, each loss was followed by a win. They defeated number 12 Notre Dame but lost to four ranked teams in that span, including a final day loss to then number 17 Notre Dame.

The Cardinals finished the season 24–10 overall and 12–6 in ACC play to finish in a tie for fifth place. As the fifth seed in the ACC tournament, they defeated thirteenth seed Boston College in the Second Round before losing to fourth seed and eventual champion Notre Dame in the quarterfinals. They received an at-large invitation to the NCAA Tournament, marking the thirteenth straight time the Cardinals qualified for the tournament. As the sixth seed in the Albany 2, they were upset by eleventh seed Middle Tennessee in the first round to end their season.

== Previous season ==
The Cardinals finished the season 26–12 overall and 12–6 in ACC play to finish in a tie for fourth place. As the fourth seed in the ACC tournament, they earned a bye to the quarterfinals, where they defeated twelfth seed Wake Forest. They then defeated first seed Notre Dame in the semifinals before falling short in the final to third seed Virginia Tech. They received an at-large bid to the NCAA tournament and were the fifth seed in the Seattle 4 Regional. They defeated twelfth seed Drake in the first round, fourth seed Texas in the second round, and eighth seed Ole Miss in the Sweet Sixteen, before losing to second seed Iowa in the Elite Eight to end their season. The Cardinals' 24 total wins was their lowest season win total since 2011–12.

== Off-season ==
=== Departures ===
Departures
Name	Number	Pos.	Height	Year	Hometown	Reason for departure
Zyanna Walker	1	G	5'8"	Freshman	Wichita, Kansas	Transferred to Kansas State
Chrislyn Carr	3	G	5'5"	Graduate student	Davenport, Iowa	Graduated
Mykasa Robinson	5	G	5'7"	Graduate student	Ashland, Kentucky	Graduated
Hailey Van Lith	10	G	5'7"	Junior	Wenatchee, Washington	Transferred to LSU
Norika Konno	11	G	5'10"	Senior	Sendai, Japan	Graduated
Payton Verhulst	12	G	6'1"	Sophomore	De Soto, Kansas	Transferred to Oklahoma
Jalyn Brown	15	G	6'0"	Freshman	Baltimore, Maryland	Entered transfer portal
Elizabeth Dixon	22	F	6'5"	Graduate student	Memphis, Tennessee	Graduated
Morgan Jones	24	G	6'2"	Graduate student	Jonesboro, Georgia	Graduated
Imani Lester	32	F	6'3"	Freshman	Raleigh, North Carolina	Transferred to Kansas State
Josie Williams	40	C	6'5"	Graduate student	West Haven, Utah	Graduated

=== Incoming transfers ===
Incoming transfers
Name	Number	Pos.	Height	Year	Hometown	Previous school
Sydney Taylor	1	G	5'9"	Graduate student	Long Island, New York	UMass
Hennie van Schaik	3	F	6'2"	Junior	Urk, Netherlands	Cal State Bakersfield
Kiki Jefferson	12	G	6'1"	Graduate student	Lancaster, Pennsylvania	James Madison
Nina Rickards	15	G	5'9"	Graduate student	Queens, New York	Florida
Eylia Love	24	G/F	6'1"	Junior	Kansas City, Missouri	Georgia Tech
Jayda Curry	30	G	5'6"	Sophomore	Corona, California	California

=== Recruiting class ===
College recruiting
Name	Hometown	School	Height	Weight	Commit date
Eseosa Imafidon; C	Benin City, Nigeria	Proctor Academy	6 ft 5 in (1.96 m)	N/A	
Eseosa Imafidon; C	Recruit ratings: No ratings found				
Elif İstanbulluoğlu; F	Istanbul, Turkey	Fenerbahçe S.K.	6 ft 3 in (1.91 m)	N/A	
Elif İstanbulluoğlu; F	Recruit ratings: No ratings found				
Overall recruit ranking:
Note: In many cases, Scout, Rivals, 247Sports, On3, and ESPN may conflict in their listings of height and weight.; In these cases, the average was taken. ESPN grades are on a 100-point scale.; Sources:

== Roster ==
2023–24 Louisville Cardinals women's basketball team
Players
Coaches

Pos.	#	Name	Height	Year	Previous school	Hometown
G	1	Sydney Taylor	5 ft 9 in (1.75 m)	GS	St. Anthony's; UMass	Long Island, NY
F	2	Nyla Harris	6 ft 2 in (1.88 m)	So	Lake Highland Prep	Winermere, FL
F	3	Hennie van Schaik	6 ft 3 in (1.91 m)	Jr	Centre for Sports and Education; Cal State Bakersfield	Urk, Netherlands
C	10	Eseosa Imafidon	6 ft 5 in (1.96 m)	Fr	Proctor Academy	Benin City, Nigeria
F	11	Elif İstanbulluoğlu	6 ft 3 in (1.91 m)	Fr	Fenerbahçe S.K.	Istanbul, Turkey
G	12	Kiki Jefferson	6 ft 1 in (1.85 m)	GS	Lancaster Catholic; James Madison	Lancaster, PA
G	13	Merissah Russell	6 ft 0 in (1.83 m)	Sr	Cairine Wilson	Ottawa, Ontario
G	15	Nina Rickards	5 ft 9 in (1.75 m)	GS	Christ the King; Florida	Queens, NY
F	23	Alexia Mobley	6 ft 2 in (1.88 m)	RS So	Reynoldsburg	Reynoldsburgh, OH
G/F	24	Eylia Love	6 ft 1 in (1.85 m)	Jr	Olathe North; Georgia Tech	Kansas City, MO
G	30	Jayda Curry	5 ft 6 in (1.68 m)	So	Centennial; California	Corona, CA
F	44	Olivia Cochran	6 ft 3 in (1.91 m)	Jr	Carver	Columbus, GA

Head coach

- Jeff Walz (Northern Kentucky)

Assistant coach(es)

- Stephanie Norman (Arizona State)
- Jonneshia Pineda (Georgia Southwestern State)
- Shay Robinson (Central Florida)

Legend

- (C) Team captain
- (S) Suspended
- (I) Ineligible
- (W) Walk-on
- Injured
- Current redshirt

Roster
Last update: October 31, 2023

== Schedule and results ==
Date time, TV	Rank^{#}	Opponent^{#}	Result	Record	Site (attendance) city, state
Non-conference regular season
November 6, 2023*; 6:00 p.m., ESPN+	No. 17	at Cincinnati	W 77–59	1–0	Fifth Third Arena (1,725); Cincinnati, OH
November 12, 2023*; 4:00 p.m., ACCN	No. 17	DePaul	W 81–74	2–0	KFC Yum! Center (7,456); Louisville, KY
November 16, 2023*; 7:00 p.m., ACCNX	No. 19	Bellarmine	W 111–33	3–0	KFC Yum! Center (7,486); Louisville, KY
November 19, 2023*; 4:00 p.m., ACCN	No. 19	Bucknell	W 77–44	4–0	KFC Yum! Center (7,383); Louisville, KY
November 24, 2023*; 12:00 p.m., ESPN+	No. 20	vs. Alabama; Betty Chancellor Classic	L 73–78	4–1	Merrell Center; Katy, TX
November 25, 2023*; 12:00 p.m., ESPN+	No. 20	vs. Liberty; Betty Chancellor Classic	W 72–63	5–1	Merrell Center (256); Katy, TX
November 26, 2023*; 1:45 p.m., ESPN+	No. 20	vs. Gonzaga; Betty Chancellor Classic	W 81–70	6–1	Merrell Center; Katy, TX
November 29, 2023*; 9:15 p.m., ESPNU	No. 22	at No. 19 Ole Miss; ACC–SEC Challenge	W 64–58	7–1	SJB Pavilion (2,694); University, MS
December 3, 2023*; 12:00 p.m., ACCNX	No. 22	North Carolina A&T	W 80–40	8–1	KFC Yum! Center (7,618); Louisville, KY
December 10, 2023*; 2:00 p.m., ACCN	No. 18	Kentucky; Rivalry	W 73–61	9–1	KFC Yum! Center (11,291); Louisville, KY
December 13, 2023*; 4:00 p.m., ACCNX	No. 18	Morehead State	W 74–48	10–1	KFC Yum! Center (7,086); Louisville, KY
December 16, 2023*; 12:00 p.m., Fox	No. 18	at No. 17 Connecticut	L 62–86	10–2	XL Center (13,028); Hartford, CT
December 20, 2023*; 7:00 p.m., ACCN	No. 19	No. 23 Washington	W 59–51	11–2	KFC Yum! Center (8,018); Louisville, KY
ACC regular season
December 31, 2023; 4:00 p.m., ACCN	No. 19	at Miami (FL)	W 77–72	12–2 (1–0)	Watsco Center (2,120); Coral Gables, FL
January 4, 2024; 8:00 p.m., ACCN	No. 17	Duke	W 61–44	13–2 (2–0)	KFC Yum! Center (7,789); Louisville, KY
January 11, 2024; 6:00 p.m., ACCN	No. 15	at Pittsburgh	W 74–44	14–2 (3–0)	Peterson Events Center (868); Pittsburgh, PA
January 14, 2024; 2:00 p.m., ACCN	No. 15	Wake Forest	W 83–62	15–2 (4–0)	KFC Yum! Center (8,901); Louisville, KY
January 18, 2024; 7:00 p.m., ACCNX	No. 13	at Clemson	W 81–64	16–2 (5–0)	Littlejohn Coliseum (868); Clemson, SC
January 21, 2024; 2:00 p.m., ACCN	No. 13	at No. 23 North Carolina	L 68–79	16–3 (5–1)	Carmichael Arena (6,073); Chapel Hill, NC
January 25, 2024; 7:00 p.m., ACCNX	No. 18	Boston College	W 88–60	17–3 (6–1)	KFC Yum! Center (7,606); Louisville, KY
January 28, 2024; 2:00 p.m., ACCNX	No. 18	Pittsburgh	W 77–58	18–3 (7–1)	KFC Yum! Center (9,452); Louisville, KY
February 1, 2024; 7:00 p.m., ACCNX	No. 16	No. 21 Syracuse	W 81–69	19–3 (8–1)	KFC Yum! Center (8,254); Louisville, KY
February 5, 2024; 6:00 p.m., ESPN2	No. 15	at No. 3 NC State	L 67–77	19–4 (8–2)	Reynolds Coliseum (5,500); Raleigh, NC
February 8, 2024; 6:00 p.m., ESPN	No. 15	No. 12 Notre Dame	W 73–66	20–4 (9–2)	KFC Yum! Center (9,417); Louisville, KY
February 11, 2024; 12:00 p.m., The CW	No. 15	at No. 23 Syracuse	L 72–73	20–5 (9–3)	JMA Wireless Dome (3,912); Syracuse, NY
February 15, 2024; 7:00 p.m., ACCNX	No. 18	at Boston College	W 69–67	21–5 (10–3)	Conte Forum (937); Chestnut Hill, MA
February 18, 2024; 1:00 p.m., ESPN	No. 18	No. 12 Virginia Tech	L 70–86	21–6 (10–4)	KFC Yum! Center (12,249); Louisville, KY
February 22, 2024; 6:00 p.m., ACCN	No. 20	at Georgia Tech	W 80–62	22–6 (11–4)	McCamish Pavilion (1,554); Atlanta, GA
February 25, 2024; 12:00 p.m., The CW	No. 20	Virginia	L 68–73	22–7 (11–5)	KFC Yum! Center (10,305); Louisville, KY
February 29, 2024; 8:00 p.m., ACCN	No. 22	Florida State	W 70–55	23–7 (12–5)	KFC Yum! Center (7,932); Louisville, KY
March 3, 2024; 2:00 p.m., ESPN	No. 22	at No. 17 Notre Dame	L 58–74	23–8 (12–6)	Purcell Pavilion (9,149); Notre Dame, IN
ACC Women's Tournament
March 7, 2024; 11:00 a.m., ACCN	(5) No. 24	vs. (13) Boston College; Second Round	W 58–55	24–8	Greensboro Coliseum (10,823); Greensboro, NC
March 8, 2024; 11:00 a.m., ACCN	(5) No. 24	vs. (4) No. 14 Notre Dame; Quarterfinals	L 68–77	24–9	Greensboro Coliseum (10,488); Greensboro, NC
NCAA Women's Tournament
March 22, 2024*; 1:30 p.m., ESPN2	(6 A2) No. 23	vs. (11 A2) Middle Tennessee; First Round	L 69–71	24–10	Pete Maravich Assembly Center (12,957); Baton Rouge, LA
*Non-conference game. ^{#}Rankings from AP Poll. (#) Tournament seedings in parentheses. A2=Albany 2. All times are in Eastern.

== Rankings ==
+ Regular season polls	Poll	Pre- season	Week 2	Week 3	Week 4	Week 5	Week 6	Week 7	Week 8	Week 9	Week 10	Week 11	Week 12	Week 13	Week 14	Week 15	Week 16	Week 17	Week 18	Week 19	Week 20	Final
AP	17	19	20	22	18	18	19	19	17	15	13	18	16	15	18	20	22	24	24	23	RV	
Coaches	15	15	15	19	18	17	19	19	16	15	12	16	12	15	18	20	23	24	25	25	RV	

Note: The AP does not release a final poll.

Legend
	Increase in ranking
	Decrease in ranking
	Not ranked previous week
(RV)	Received votes

== 2024 WNBA draft ==
Player	Team	Round	Pick #	Position
(United States) Kiki Jefferson	Minnesota Lynx	3	31	G
