= 2023–24 North Carolina Tar Heels women's basketball team =

Intercollegiate basketball season

2023–24 North Carolina Tar Heels women's basketball

NCAA tournament, Second Round
- Conference: Atlantic Coast Conference
- Record: 20–13 (11–7 ACC)
- Head coach: Courtney Banghart (5th season)
- Assistant coaches: Joanne Aluka-White; Itoro Coleman; Adrian Walters
- Home arena: Carmichael Arena

2023–24 ACC women's basketball standings
	Conf.				Overall
Team	W		L	PCT	W		L	PCT
No. 18 Virginia Tech	14	–	4	.778	25	–	8	.758
No. 4 NC State	13	–	5	.722	31	–	7	.816
No. 20 Syracuse	13	–	5	.722	24	–	8	.750
No. 11 Notre Dame †	13	–	5	.722	28	–	7	.800
Louisville	12	–	6	.667	24	–	10	.706
Florida State	12	–	6	.667	23	–	11	.676
No. 17 Duke	11	–	7	.611	22	–	12	.647
North Carolina	11	–	7	.611	20	–	13	.606
Miami (FL)	8	–	10	.444	19	–	12	.613
Georgia Tech	7	–	11	.389	17	–	16	.515
Virginia	7	–	11	.389	16	–	16	.500
Clemson	5	–	13	.278	12	–	19	.387
Boston College	5	–	13	.278	14	–	19	.424
Wake Forest	2	–	16	.111	7	–	25	.219
Pittsburgh	2	–	16	.111	8	–	24	.250
† 2024 ACC tournament winner Rankings from AP poll

The 2023–24 North Carolina Tar Heels women's basketball team represented the University of North Carolina at Chapel Hill in the 2023–24 NCAA Division I women's basketball season. The Tar Heels were led by head coach Courtney Banghart, in her fifth season in Chapel Hill. She was assisted by Joanne Aluka-White, Adrian Walters, and Itoro Coleman. The Tar Heels played their home games at Carmichael Arena, as members of the Atlantic Coast Conference.

The Tar Heels started the season ranked sixteenth in the nation and won their first five straight games. However, they then lost four of their next five games, including two at their early season tournament, the Gulf Coast Showcase, and their ACC–SEC Challenge matchup. Three of these four losses were to ranked teams, including number 16 Kansas State, number 1 South Carolina and number 17 Connecticut. They finished the non-conference season with two straight wins and an 8–4 record. The Tar Heels won their first three ACC regular season games, including wins over number 25 Syracuse and number 16 Notre Dame. They dropped a game to number 21 Florida State before winning their next four straight games. Their four-game winning streak included a win over number 13 Louisville. The Tar Heels lost their next four straight games and fell out of the national rankings. They lost two of their final six games of the season, including to number 8 Virginia Tech. A highlight of the wins was a rivalry win over number 6 NC State.

The Tar Heels finished the season 20–13 overall and 11–7 in ACC play to finish in a tie for seventh place. As the eighth seed in the ACC tournament, they lost to ninth seed Miami in the second round. They received an at-large invitation to the NCAA Tournament, marking the fourth straight time the Tar Heels qualified for the tournament. As the eighth seed in the Albany 1 region, they defeated ninth seed Michigan State in the first round before losing at first seed South Carolina in the second round to end their season.

== Previous season ==
Ranked No. 12 in the preseason AP Poll, Banghart's Tar Heels got off to another hot start. They won six straight games to start the season, culminating in a come-from-behind victory to defeat No. 5 Iowa State in the championship game of the women's PKI, climbing as high as No. 6 in the nation during their win streak. ACC play proved more challenging for the Tar Heels, as the team lost its first three conference games in a row before upsetting then-No. 4 Notre Dame at home in Carmichael to earn their first ACC win of the season.

The Tar Heels finished ACC play with an 11–7 conference record, tying Miami for sixth place in the regular season standings, but lost the tiebreaker to the Hurricanes and were awarded the 7 seed in the ACC Tournament. They faced and defeated 10th seed Clemson in the second round, giving Coach Banghart her first victory in the ACC tournament as Tar Heels coach.

After being in contention most of the season for a top-four seed in the NCAA Tournament, which would have given them the privilege of hosting first and second round games, the Tar Heels ultimately earned the 6 seed in the Seattle 3 Regional. They defeated 11 seed St. John's in the first round before losing to 3 seed Ohio State in the second round, ending their season just shy of a second-straight sweet sixteen appearance and with a 22–11 overall record.

== Offseason ==
Shortly following the conclusion of the 2022–23 season, guard/forward Destiny Adams announced her intention to enter the transfer portal via social media. She later committed to Rutgers, returning to her home state of New Jersey.

A day later, multi-year starter Kennedy Todd-Williams also entered the transfer portal, to the surprise of many in Chapel Hill. She committed to Ole Miss shortly thereafter.

Guards Eva Hodgson and Ariel Young also departed the team at the end of the season. Young was forced to medically retire due to a knee injury sustained in 2021, and Hodgson completed her fifth and final year of college eligibility.

In addition to the incoming recruiting class, Banghart and the Tar Heels were active in the transfer portal to mitigate the departures, as on April 3, former Boston College F/C Maria Gakdeng committed to the Tar Heels for the 2023–24 season.

The Tar Heels added another player from the transfer portal on April 24, when former Iowa State guard and 2022 Big XII Defensive Player of the Year Lexi Donarski committed to the team. She had two years of eligibility remaining.

The roster received another boost when 2022 NC Gatorade POY and McDonald's All-American Indya Nivar committed to the team on April 30, in a post on social media. She had spent her first year of college basketball at Stanford.

=== Departures ===
Departures
Name	Number	Pos.	Height	Year	Hometown	Reason for departure
Destiny Adams	20	G/F	6'3"	Sophomore	Manchester, NJ	Transferred to Rutgers
Eva Hodgson	10	G	5'10"	RS senior	Rindge, NH	Exhausted eligibility
Kennedy Todd-Williams	3	G	6'0"	Junior	Jacksonville, NC	Transferred to Ole Miss
Malu Tshitenge	21	F	6'3"	Senior	Germantown, MD	Graduated
Ariel Young	11	G	6'1"	RS senior	Tallahassee, FL	Medical retirement

=== Additions ===
==== Incoming transfers ====
Incoming transfers
Name	Number	Pos.	Height	Year	Hometown	Previous school
Lexi Donarski	20	G	6'0"	Senior	La Crosse, WI	Iowa State
Maria Gakdeng	5	F/C	6'3"	Junior	Lanham, MD	Boston College
Indya Nivar	24	G	5'10"	Sophomore	Apex, NC	Stanford

==== Recruiting class ====
College recruiting
Name	Hometown	School	Height	Weight	Commit date
Ciera Toomey; P	Dunmore, PA	Dunmore	6 ft 3 in (1.91 m)	N/A	Apr 11, 2022
Ciera Toomey; P	Recruit ratings: ESPN: (97)				
Reniya Kelly; PG	Hoover, AL	Hoover	5 ft 5 in (1.65 m)	N/A	Nov 20, 2021
Reniya Kelly; PG	Recruit ratings: ESPN: (95)				
Rylee Grays; P	Houston, TX	Pearland	6 ft 3 in (1.91 m)	N/A	Jun 20, 2022
Rylee Grays; P	Recruit ratings: ESPN: (92)				
Laila Hull; F	Zionsville, IN	Zionsville Community	6 ft 1 in (1.85 m)	N/A	Oct 25, 2022
Laila Hull; F	Recruit ratings: ESPN: (91)				
Sydney Barker†; G	Durham, NC	Jordan	5 ft 7 in (1.70 m)	N/A	
Sydney Barker†; G	Recruit ratings: No ratings found				
Overall recruit ranking:
Note: In many cases, Scout, Rivals, 247Sports, On3, and ESPN may conflict in their listings of height and weight.; In these cases, the average was taken. ESPN grades are on a 100-point scale.; Sources:

† Denotes walk-on

== Roster ==
2023–24 North Carolina Tar Heels women's basketball team
Players
Coaches

Pos.	#	Name	Height	Year	Previous school	Hometown
F	0	Alexandria Zelaya	6 ft 4 in (1.93 m)	Sr	Millennium	Goodyear, AZ
G	1	Alyssa Ustby	6 ft 1 in (1.85 m)	Sr	Lourdes	Rochester, MN
G	2	Paulina Paris	5 ft 9 in (1.75 m)	So	Saddle River Day School	Congers, NY
F	4	Laila Hull	6 ft 1 in (1.85 m)	Fr	Zionsville Community	Zionsville, IN
F/C	5	Maria Gakdeng	6 ft 3 in (1.91 m)	Jr	Boston College	Lanham, MD
G	10	Reniya Kelly	5 ft 5 in (1.65 m)	Fr	Hoover	Hoover, AL
G	11	Kayla McPherson	5 ft 8 in (1.73 m)	RS So	Madison County	Hull, GA
G/F	13	Teonni Key	6 ft 4 in (1.93 m)	RS So	Cary	Cary, NC
G	15	Sydney Barker	5 ft 7 in (1.7 m)	Fr	Jordan	Durham, NC
G	20	Lexi Donarski	6 ft 0 in (1.83 m)	Sr	Iowa State	La Crosse, WI
F/C	21	Ciera Toomey	6 ft 3 in (1.91 m)	Fr	Dunmore	Dunmore, PA
F/C	22	Rylee Grays	6 ft 3 in (1.91 m)	Fr	Pearland	Houston, TX
G	24	Indya Nivar	5 ft 10 in (1.78 m)	So	Stanford	Apex, NC
G	25	Deja Kelly	5 ft 8 in (1.73 m)	Sr	Duncanville	San Antonio, TX
F	31	Anya Poole	6 ft 2 in (1.88 m)	Sr	Southeast Raleigh	Raleigh, NC

Head coach

- Courtney Banghart (Dartmouth)

Assistant coach(es)

- Joanne Aluka-White (Middle Tennessee)
- Adrian Walters (Saint Francis (PA))
- Itoro Coleman (Clemson)

Legend

- (C) Team captain
- (S) Suspended
- (I) Ineligible
- (W) Walk-on
- Injured
- Current redshirt

Roster
Last update: November 3, 2023

== Schedule ==
Date time, TV	Rank^{#}	Opponent^{#}	Result	Record	Site (attendance) city, state
Non-conference regular season
November 8, 2023*; 7:00 p.m., ACCNX	No. 16	Gardner–Webb	W 102–49	1–0	Carmichael Arena (2,212); Chapel Hill, NC
November 12, 2023*; 6:00 p.m., ACCN	No. 16	Davidson	W 74–70	2–0	Carmichael Arena (2,336); Chapel Hill, NC
November 15, 2023*; 11:00 a.m., ACCNX	No. 17	Hampton	W 62–32	3–0	Carmichael Arena (3,144); Chapel Hill, NC
November 18, 2023*; 3:00 p.m., ACCNX	No. 17	Elon	W 68–39	4–0	Carmichael Arena (2,566); Chapel Hill, NC
November 24, 2023*; 1:30 p.m., FloHoops	No. 18	vs. Vermont; Gulf Coast Showcase first round	W 54–51	5–0	Hertz Arena (327); Estero, FL
November 25, 2023*; 5:00 p.m., FloHoops	No. 18	vs. No. 16 Kansas State; Gulf Coast Showcase semifinals	L 56–63	5–1	Hertz Arena (2,207); Estero, FL
November 26, 2023*; 5:00 p.m., FloHoops	No. 18	vs. Florida Gulf Coast; Gulf Coast Showcase 3rd place game	L 64–65	5–2	Hertz Arena (2,120); Estero, FL
November 30, 2023*; 7:00 p.m., ESPN	No. 24	No. 1 South Carolina; ACC–SEC Challenge	L 58–65	5–3	Carmichael Arena (6,319); Chapel Hill, NC
December 6, 2023*; 7:00 p.m., ACCNX	No. 24	UNC Greensboro	W 81–66	6–3	Carmichael Arena (2,066); Chapel Hill, NC
December 10, 2023*; 5:00 p.m., ESPN	No. 24	vs. No. 17 UConn; Hall of Fame Women's Showcase	L 64–76	6–4	Mohegan Sun Arena (8,428); Uncasville, CT
December 15, 2023*; 7:00 p.m., ACCNX	No. 25	Western Carolina	W 96–36	7–4	Carmichael Arena (2,643); Chapel Hill, NC
December 19, 2023*; 9:30 p.m., ESPN2	No. 24	vs. Oklahoma; Jumpman Invitational	W 61–52	8–4	Spectrum Center (7,027); Charlotte, NC
ACC regular season
December 31, 2023; 12:00 p.m., The CW	No. 24	Clemson	W 82–76	9–4 (1–0)	Carmichael Arena (3,820); Chapel Hill, NC
January 4, 2024; 6:00 p.m., ACCNX		No. 25 Syracuse	W 75–51	10–4 (2–0)	Carmichael Arena (2,006); Chapel Hill, NC
January 7, 2024; 5:00 p.m., ESPN2		at No. 16 Notre Dame	W 61–57	11–4 (3–0)	Purcell Pavilion (6,418); Notre Dame, IN
January 11, 2024; 6:00 p.m., ACCNX	No. 20	at No. 21 Florida State	L 62–70	11–5 (3–1)	Donald L. Tucker Center (1,946); Tallahassee, FL
January 14, 2024; 4:00 p.m., ACCN	No. 20	Virginia	W 81–68	12–5 (4–1)	Carmichael Arena (4,579); Chapel Hill, NC
January 18, 2024; 6:00 p.m., ACCN	No. 23	at Georgia Tech	W 73–68	13–5 (5–1)	McCamish Pavilion (1,605); Atlanta, GA
January 21, 2024; 2:00 p.m., ACCN	No. 23	No. 13 Louisville	W 79–68	14–5 (6–1)	Carmichael Arena (6,073); Chapel Hill, NC
January 25, 2024; 8:00 p.m., ACCN	No. 20	Miami (FL)	W 66–61	15–5 (7–1)	Carmichael Arena (2,530); Chapel Hill, NC
January 28, 2024; 12:00 p.m., The CW	No. 20	at Virginia	L 66–81	15–6 (7–2)	John Paul Jones Arena (5,690); Charlottesville, VA
February 1, 2024; 8:00 p.m., ACCN	No. 24	at No. 5 NC State; Rivalry	L 59–63	15–7 (7–3)	Reynolds Coliseum (5,500); Raleigh, NC
February 4, 2024; 12:00 p.m., ESPN2	No. 24	No. 17 Virginia Tech	L 61–70 ^{OT}	15–8 (7–4)	Carmichael Arena (5,618); Chapel Hill, NC
February 11, 2024; 2:00 p.m., ACCN		at Duke	L 60–68 ^{OT}	15–9 (7–5)	Cameron Indoor Stadium (9,314); Durham, NC
February 15, 2024; 6:00 p.m., ACCNX		Pittsburgh	W 75–62	16–9 (8–5)	Carmichael Arena (2,508); Chapel Hill, NC
February 18, 2024; 6:00 p.m., ACCN		at Wake Forest	W 58–50	17–9 (9–5)	LJVM Coliseum (1,943); Winston-Salem, NC
February 22, 2024; 8:00 p.m., ACCN		No. 6 NC State; Rivalry	W 80–70	18–9 (10–5)	Carmichael Arena (4,131); Chapel Hill, NC
February 25, 2024; 2:00 p.m., ACCN		at No. 8 Virginia Tech	L 62–74	18–10 (10–6)	Cassell Coliseum (8,925); Blacksburg, VA
February 29, 2024; 7:00 p.m., ACCNX		at Boston College	L 74–78	18–11 (10–7)	Conte Forum (1,621); Chestnut Hill, MA
March 3, 2024; 4:00 p.m., ESPN		Duke	W 63–59	19–11 (11–7)	Carmichael Arena (6,319); Chapel Hill, NC
ACC Tournament
March 7, 2024; 1:30 p.m., ACCN	(8)	vs. (9) Miami; Second Round	L 59–60	19–12	Greensboro Coliseum (10,823); Greensboro, NC
NCAA Tournament
March 22, 2024*; 11:30 a.m., ESPN2	(8 A1)	vs. (9 A1) Michigan State; First round	W 59–56	20–12	Colonial Life Arena (11,536); Columbia, SC
March 24, 2024*; 1:00 p.m., ABC	(8 A1)	at (1 A1) No. 1 South Carolina; Second round	L 41–88	20–13	Colonial Life Arena (14,266); Columbia, SC
*Non-conference game. ^{#}Rankings from AP Poll. (#) Tournament seedings in parentheses. A1=Albany 1. All times are in Eastern.

== Rankings ==
Ranking movements Legend: ██ Increase in ranking ██ Decrease in ranking — = Not ranked RV = Received votes
	Week																				
Poll	Pre	1	2	3	4	5	6	7	8	9	10	11	12	13	14	15	16	17	18	19	Final
AP	16	17	18	24	24	25	24	24	RV	20	23	20	24	RV	RV	RV	RV	RV	—	—	RV
Coaches	17	16	17	24	24	25	25	RV	RV	22	24	21	24	RV	—	—	—	—	—	—	RV
