= Kiki Jefferson =

American basketball player (born 2001)

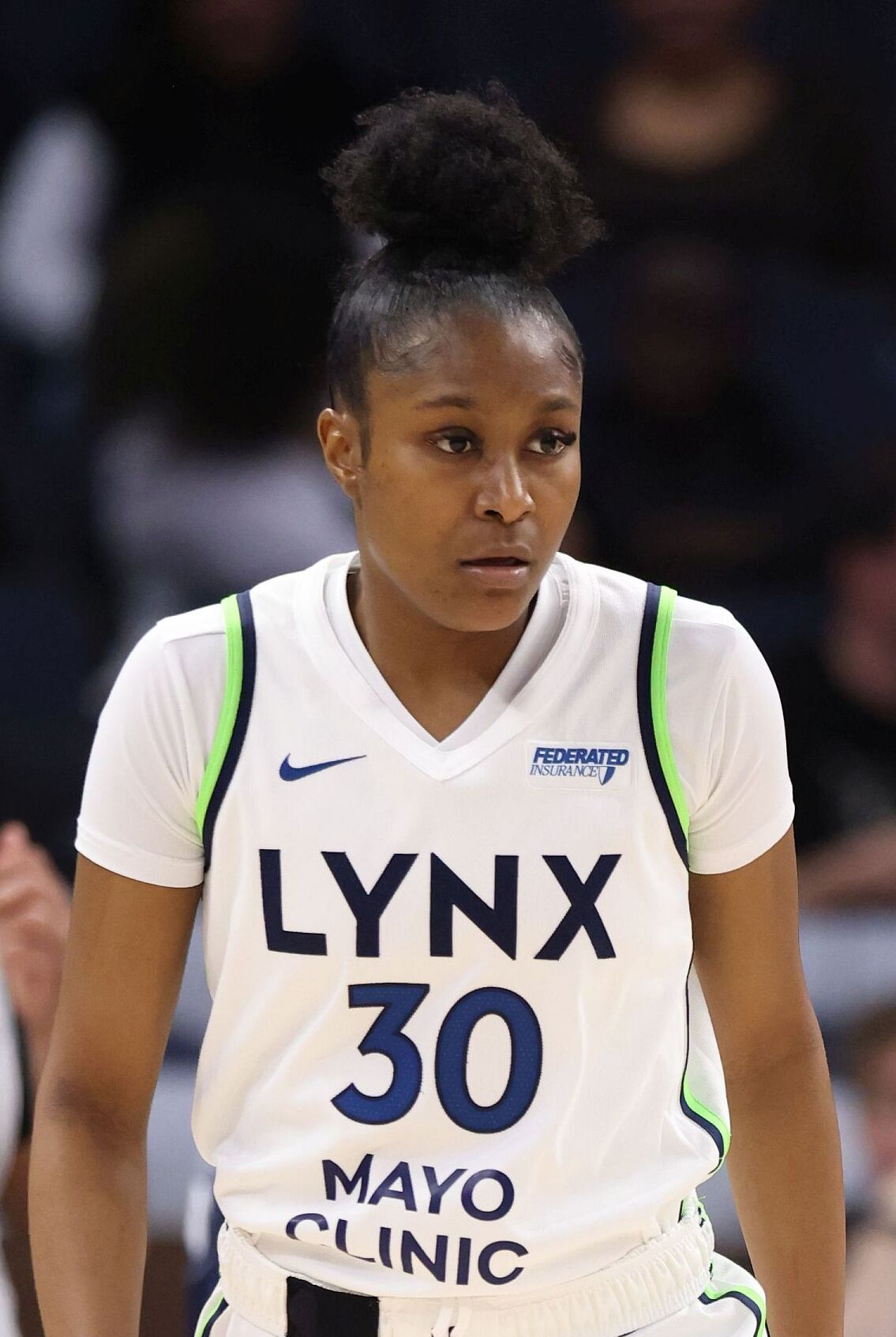
- Jefferson with the Minnesota Lynx in 2024

Personal information
- Born: March 1, 2001 (age 25) Lancaster, Pennsylvania, U.S.
- Listed height: 6 ft 1 in (1.85 m)

Career information
- High school: Lancaster Catholic (Lancaster, Pennsylvania)
- College: James Madison (2019–2023); Louisville (2023–2024)
- WNBA draft: 2024: 3rd round, 31st
- Drafted by: Minnesota Lynx
- Playing career: 2024–present
- Position: Guard

Career history
- 2024: Cadí La Seu

Career highlights
- Sun Belt tournament MVP (2023); Sun Belt Player of the Year (2023); First-team All-Sun Belt (2023); First-team All-CAA (2021); CAA Freshman of the Year (2020); CAA All-Freshman Team (2020)
- Stats at WNBA.com
- Stats at Basketball Reference

Kiyana Patrice McGill-Jefferson (born March 1, 2001) is an American professional basketball player who is a free agent. She was drafted by the Minnesota Lynx in the 2024 WNBA draft. She played college basketball for the James Madison Dukes and the Louisville Cardinals.

== Early life ==
Jefferson was born in Lancaster, Pennsylvania, to Marcus and Kiyana Jefferson.

== High school career ==
She attended and played basketball at Lancaster Catholic High School in Lancaster, under head coach Charlie Detz. Detz described Jefferson as "a special person and a once-in-a-generational player." During her time on the team, she was named to the Lancaster Lebanon League First-Team selection three times, Lancaster Lebanon All-Star, USA Today Pennsylvania First Team honoree three times, USA Today Pennsylvania Player of the Year, Pennsylvania Class 4A Player of the Year twice, and PennLive's Player of the Year twice.

Jefferson helped her team go undefeated in her junior year, winning the Lancaster Lebanon League, District Three championship, and the Pennsylvania Interscholastic Athletic Association (PIAA) championship. She finished her high school career with 2,510 career points, ranking second all-time in the Lancaster Lebanon League.

She played for the Philadelphia Belles in the Nike Elite Youth Basketball League (EYBL).

== College career ==
In college, she played four seasons at James Madison University (JMU) and one graduate season at the University of Louisville. At JMU, she was named Coastal Athletic Association (CAA) Rookie of the Week nine times, the second most in conference history.

In her freshman year of 2019–20, Jefferson played in all 29 games and started in 25. She average 9.8 points per game (ppg), 5.6 rebounds, 1.8 assists, and 1.1 steals. She had a 46.4% shot rate from the field and a 39.7% rate from behind the arc. In her debut game, she scored 17 points, nine rebounds, three steals, and three assists against Longwood University. She was named 2020 CAA Rookie of the Year as well as named to the 2020 CAA All-Rookie Team.

In her sophomore season of 2020–21, she started in all 24 games. She led the team with 388 points total, 16.2 points per game, 188 rebounds, 7.8 rebounds per game, and 26 steals. Jefferson led the CAA in free throws with an 82% shot rate. In 2021, she was named to the 2020–21 All-CAA First Team, the Virginia Sports Information Directors (VaSID) All-State First Team, the CAA All-Tournament Team, and All-CAA First Team.

In the 2021–22 season, her junior year, Jefferson started in all 29 games and led the team in scoring with 18.8 ppg average and 545 points total. She had two games where she scored 30-plus points. Jefferson entered the top-10 all time for free throws in the JMU Dukes history with 174 free throws on an 81.3% shot rate. She was fourth nationally in free throws that season. As a student, she was awarded JMU Athletic Director's Scholar-Athlete in spring 2022, and CAA Commissioner's Academic Honor Roll in both fall 2021 and spring 2022.

Finishing her career at JMU in the 2022–23 season, she placed second in career free throws with 550, fifth in scoring average, sixth in all-time points with 1,838 points, and ninth in rebounds with 815. She was also tied for sixth in free throw percentage with an 80.2% shot rate, tied for ninth in field goals with 518, and tied for 10th in three-point percentage with a 33.9% shot rate. She was award the 2023 Sun Belt Conference (SBC) Tournament Most Outstanding Player, and was named to the SBC's tournament team while averaging 18.7 points and 5.3 rebounds per game, with a 75% shot rate from three. Jefferson was awarded the 2022–23 Sun Belt Player of the Week three times, as well as Sun Belt Player of the Year. She was named to the First Team All-Sun Belt, VaSID All-State First Team, and Eastern College Athletic Conference (ECAC) First Team.

Jefferson transferred to the University of Louisville for her graduate year, where she finished the 2023–24 season with a team best of 12.3 ppg, second with 2.3 assists, and third with 4.5 rebounds per game. She played in all 34 games and started in 32. Jefferson helped the Cards to a 24–10 record. She was named to the All-Atlantic Coast Conference (ACC) Second Team, and was awarded the 2023–24 Cheryl Miller Award Top 10 List.

She finished her college career with 2,257 points, 969 rebounds, 349 assists, 142 steals, 71 blocks, and 155 three-pointers. She made 82% of her foul shots.

== Professional career ==
=== WNBA ===
Jefferson was drafted in the third round, 31st overall, by the Minnesota Lynx in the 2024 WNBA draft. She was the 17th player from the University of Louisville to be selected in the draft, and the second by the Lynx. Lynx head coach Cheryl Reeve describes Jefferson as "an all-around good basketball player who impacts the game in a variety of ways. She scores, rebounds and can pass". On May 9, 2024, Jefferson was waived by the Lynx.

=== Unrivaled ===
In February 2025, Laces BC signed Jefferson to a relief player contract for their game against Vinyl BC on February 8. However, the game was canceled by the league "to prioritize player health and safety."

== Career statistics ==
=== College ===
Year	Team	GP	GS	MPG	FG%	3P%	FT%	RPG	APG	SPG	BPG	TO	PPG
2019–20	James Madison	29	25	24.2	46.4	39.7	77.3	5.6	1.8	1.1	0.6	1.5	9.8
2020–21	James Madison	24	24	29.3	44.5	34.9	82.0	7.8	2.4	1.1	0.4	3.0	16.2
2021–22	James Madison	29	29	30.9	40.7	27.4	81.3	6.8	2.2	0.7	0.7	3.4	18.8
2022–23	James Madison	34	32	29.2	42.9	34.1	79.1	7.9	2.9	0.8	0.4	2.2	18.3
2023–24	Louisville	34	32	24.4	46.6	34.9	88.4	4.5	2.3	1.1	0.2	2.1	12.3
Career		150	142	27.5	43.7	34.1	81.5	6.5	2.3	0.9	0.5	2.4	15.0
Statistics retrieved from Sports-Reference

== Personal life ==
Jefferson has a brother, Steven, and a sister, Ayanda. She majored in Sport & Recreation Management at James Madison University.
