= Carol Owens (basketball) =

American basketball coach

Current position
- Title: Associate head coach
- Team: Notre Dame
- Conference: ACC

Biographical details
- Born: June 4, 1967 (age 59)

Playing career
- 1985–1990: Northern Illinois

Coaching career (HC unless noted)
- 1993–1995: Michigan (assistant)
- 1995–2002: Notre Dame (assistant)
- 2002–2005: Notre Dame (associate HC)
- 2005–2010: Northern Illinois
- 2010–present: Notre Dame (associate HC)

Head coaching record
- Overall: 66–81 (.449)
Medal record
Women's basketball
Representing United States
FIBA U19 World Cup
Head coach for the United States
| Gold medal – first place | 2009 Bangkok |
Assistant coach for the United States
| Gold medal – first place | 2007 Bratislava |
FIBA U18 Americas Championship
Head coach for the United States
| Gold medal – first place | 2008 Buenos Aires |
Assistant coach for the United States
| Gold medal – first place | 2006 Colorado Springs |

Carol Owens (born June 4, 1967) is an American basketball coach and former player who is currently the associate head coach for women's basketball at the University of Notre Dame, a role she has held since 2010. Owens played college basketball at Northern Illinois, where she also served as head coach from 2005 to 2010 before resigning at the end of the 2009–10 season.

Prior to being the head coach at Northern Illinois, Owens was an assistant coach at Michigan for two seasons and at Notre Dame for 10 seasons.

== Head coaching record ==
Record table
| Season | Team | Overall | Conference | Standing | Postseason |
|---|---|---|---|---|---|
Northern Illinois Huskies (Mid-American Conference) (2005–2010)
| 2005–06 | Northern Illinois | 12–17 | 7–9 | T–4th (West) | |
| 2006–07 | Northern Illinois | 19–12 | 8–8 | 3rd (West) | |
| 2007–08 | Northern Illinois | 10–18 | 6–8 | 4th (West) | |
| 2008–09 | Northern Illinois | 15–15 | 10–6 | 3rd (West) | |
| 2009–10 | Northern Illinois | 10–19 | 4–12 | T–5th (West) | |
| Northern Illinois: | | 66–81 (.449) | 35–43 (.449) | | |
| Total: | | 66–81 (.449) | | | |
National champion Postseason invitational champion Conference regular season champion Conference regular season and conference tournament champion Division regular season champion Division regular season and conference tournament champion Conference tournament champion
