= Clifton Hunter High School =

Location
- 311 Frank Sound Road; Grand Cayman; Cayman Islands
- Coordinates: 19°18′35″N 81°10′59″W

Information
- School type: High School
- Website: schools.edu.ky/CHHS/Pages/Home.aspx

Clifton Hunter High School (CHHS) is a senior high school in Frank Sound, North Side, Grand Cayman, Cayman Islands.

The school opened in 2010.

== History ==
In the Fall of 2010, middle and high school education merged at the public school level in the Cayman Islands.

The old George Hicks High School was absorbed by John Gray and the newly formed Clifton Hunter High School. The schools were then divided up by catchment area; children on the Eastern side of the island (up to Newlands) would attend Clifton Hunter High School (years 7–11), and children living from Prospect up to West Bay were moved to the John Gray High School (which now encompassed years 7 through year 11). Clifton Hunter High School was situated on the former George Hicks campus.

In 2012, Clifton Hunter moved to a newly built campus on in the district of North Side, while John Gray High moved to the former George Hicks campus in George Town, and the old John Gray campus was made into the Cayman Islands Further Education Centre (CIFEC).

In the Spring of 2025, Clifton Hunter was one of two schools in the Cayman Islands to participate in the F1 in Schools program launched by The Cayman Motoring Federation. Students got STEM experience designing, building, and racing their own miniature F1 cars.
