= John Gray High School =

Location
- 135 Olympic Way; George Town, Grand Cayman; Cayman Islands; 19°16′45.538″N 81°23′8.343″W

Information
- School type: High School
- Principal: Jonathan Clark
- Website: schools.edu.ky/JGHS

John Gray High School (JGHS) is a senior high school in George Town, Grand Cayman, Cayman Islands.

== History ==
Church of Scotland missionary and Cayman Islands school inspector Rev. George Hicks opened Cayman High School in January 1949. Scottish missionary Rev. John Gray became the school's headmaster in April of that year. The Cayman Islands government began assisting the school in 1961 and took over its operations in 1964.

In September 1970 it merged with the vocational school Secondary Modern, becoming a comprehensive school. The student population eventually reached 1,000. In order to relieve Cayman High, Cayman Islands Middle School opened in September 1979. Cayman High was renamed to John Gray High School in September 1992, and at the same time Cayman Islands Middle was renamed to George Hicks High School. In Fall 2010, middle school and high school education were merged at the public school level, meaning that children from Years 7-11 would consequently all attend school together (previously, children in Years 7-9 would attend the George Hicks High School before graduating to the John Gray High School). The old George Hicks High School was absorbed by John Gray and the newly formed Clifton Hunter High School. The schools were then divided up by catchment area; children on the Eastern side of the island (up to Newlands) would attend Clifton Hunter High School(Years 7–11), and children living from Prospect up to West Bay were moved to the John Gray High School(which now encompassed Years 7 through Year 11). Clifton Hunter High School was situated on the former George Hicks campus. In 2012, Clifton Hunter moved to a newly built campus on in the district of North Side, while John Gray High moved to the former George Hicks campus in George Town, and the old John Grey campus was made into the Cayman Islands Further Education Centre (CIFEC).

In March 20, 2023, John Gray moved to a newly built campus after 15 years of construction. The old campus would ultimately become CIFEC after renovation.

== Gymnasium ==
The school's gymnasium is home to the Cayman Islands Classic, which hosts multiple NCAA Division I college basketball teams for an in-season tournament bracket. It has been held in late-November every year since 2017.
