= Cayman Islands Classic =

College basketball tournament in the Cayman Islands

- Logo of the Cayman Islands Classic
- Sport: College basketball
- Founded: 2017
- Founder: Caymax Sports Ltd
- No. of teams: 8
- Country: Cayman Islands
- Venue: John Gray Gymnasium
- Most recent champion: Boston College
- Website: Cayman Islands Classic

The Cayman Islands Classic, operated by Caymax Sports Ltd., is an early-season college basketball tournament that takes place in late November of each year, at John Gray Gymnasium in George Town, Cayman Islands. The tournament bracket mirrors other popular NCAA early-season basketball tournaments like Hawaii's Maui Invitational and the Bahamas’ Battle 4 Atlantis. The inaugural tournament started and concluded from November 20–22, 2017. Since the Mountain West Conference has sponsored the tournament, a Mountain West team has been featured in the classic every year.

== Champions ==
Year	Champion
2017	Cincinnati
2018	Creighton
2019	George Mason
2022	Kansas State
2023	Utah State
2024	Boston College

== Brackets ==
* – Denotes overtime period

=== 2025 ===
==== Men's ====
Sunday, November 23
McNeese	92
George Washington	86

Sunday, November 23
Murray State	87
Middle Tennessee	90

Monday, November 24
Middle Tennessee	79
George Washington	92

Monday, November 24
Murray State	60
McNeese	73

Tuesday, November 25
McNeese	72
Middle Tennessee	62

Tuesday, November 25
George Washington	95
Murray State	96

* – Denotes overtime period

==== Women's ====
* – Denotes overtime period

Little Cayman Division

Friday, November 28
24	Oklahoma State	74
	Charlotte	65

Friday, November 28
George Washington	77
Miami (FL)	83^{OT}

Saturday, November 29
	Miami (FL)	84
24	Oklahoma State	87

Saturday, November 29
Charlotte	67
George Washington	81

Cayman Brac Division

Friday, November 28
Georgia Tech	75
St. John's	77

Friday, November 28
Memphis	60
Florida	74

Saturday, November 29
Florida	65
Georgia Tech	56

Saturday, November 29
St. John's	84
Memphis	73

=== 2024 ===
==== Men's ====
Fifth Place; Tuesday, November 26
Hampton	73
High Point	76
Seventh Place; Tuesday, November 26
Duquesne	67
Old Dominion	54

Consolation Semifinals; Monday, November 25
Hampton	64
Duquesne	59
High Point	73
Old Dominion	67

Quarterfinals; Sunday, November 24
Hampton	69
Boise State	83
South Dakota State	71
Duquesne	60
Missouri State	71
High Point	61
Old Dominion	52
Boston College	82

Semifinals; Monday, November 25
Boise State	83
South Dakota State	82
Missouri State	74
Boston College	76*

Championship; Tuesday, November 26
Boise State	61
Boston College	63
Third Place; Tuesday, November 26
South Dakota State	75
Missouri State	55

* – Denotes overtime period

==== Women's ====
* – Denotes overtime period

The 2024 Women's Cayman Islands Classic will be a five team Showcase Format Round-robin tournament with predetermined opponents.

Thursday, November 28
Mississippi State	66
Utah	62

Friday, November 29
17	TCU	76
3	Notre Dame	68

Friday, November 29
South Florida	52
Mississippi State	59

Saturday, November 30
	Utah	78
3	Notre Dame	67

Saturday, November 30
	South Florida	46
17	TCU	87

=== 2023 ===
The tournament began on November 19, 2023, and concluded on November 21, 2023.

5th Place Game; November 21
Oakland	78
Marshall	71
7th Place Game
Loyola Marymount	61
FIU	60

Consolation 2nd Round; November 20
Oakland	74
Loyola Marymount	69
Marshall	80
FIU	69

First Round; November 19
Oakland	77
Drake	85
Loyola Marymount	76
Stephen F. Austin	86
Marshall	60
Utah State	83
FIU	71
Akron	77

Semifinals; November 20
Drake	68
Stephen F. Austin	92
Utah State	65
Akron	62

Championship; November 21
Stephen F. Austin	49
Utah State	79
3rd Place Game
Drake	79
Akron	59

=== 2022 ===
The tournament began on November 21, 2022, and concluded on November 23, 2022.

5th Place Game; November 23
Western Kentucky	71
Tulane	65
7th Place Game
Illinois State	44
Rhode Island	57

Consolation 2nd Round; November 22
Illinois State	66
Western Kentucky	78
Tulane	78
Rhode Island	75

First Round; November 21
Illinois State	61
LSU	77
Western Kentucky	53
Akron	72
Nevada	75
Tulane	66
Kansas State	77
Rhode Island	57

Semifinals; November 22
LSU	73
Akron	58
Nevada	87
Kansas State	96

Championship; November 23
LSU	59
Kansas State	61
3rd Place Game
Akron	58
Nevada	62

=== 2021 ===
The 2021 tournament was postponed to 2022 due to existing COVID-19 travel restrictions in the Cayman Islands.

=== 2020 ===
The 2020 Cayman Islands Classic was canceled due to the NCAA changing the starting date of college basketball as a result of the COVID-19 pandemic.

=== 2019 ===
5th Place Game; November 27
Colorado State	79
Washington State	69
7th Place Game
Loyola	68
Old Dominion	61

Consolation 2nd Round; November 26
Colorado State	61
Loyola	60
Old Dominion	50
Washington State	66

First Round; November 25
Colorado State	70
New Mexico State	78*
Loyola	55
South Florida	66
George Mason	60
Old Dominion	53
Washington State	71
Nebraska	82

Semifinals; November 26
New Mexico State	65
South Florida	45
George Mason	85
Nebraska	66

Championship; November 27
New Mexico State	64
George Mason	68
3rd Place Game
South Florida	67
Nebraska	74

=== 2018 ===
Source:. Source:

5th Place Game; November 21
Illinois State	73
Boise State	70
7th Place Game
Akron	61
St. Bonaventure	49

Consolation 2nd Round; November 20
Akron	68
Illinois State	73
St. Bonaventure	52
Boise State	72

First Round; November 19
Akron	69
16	Clemson	72
Georgia	80
Illinois State	68
St. Bonaventure	65
Georgia State	75
Boise State	82
Creighton	94

Semifinals; November 20
16	Clemson	64
Georgia	49
Georgia State	68
Creighton	93

Championship; November 21
16	Clemson	62
Creighton	87
3rd Place Game
Georgia	67
Georgia State	91

=== 2017 ===
5th Place Game; November 22
South Dakota State	94
Buffalo	80
7th Place Game
Iowa	95
UAB	85

Consolation 2nd Round; November 21
Iowa	72
South Dakota State	80
UAB	91
Buffalo	96

First Round; November 20
Louisiana	80
Iowa	71
South Dakota State	65
Wyoming	77
Richmond	63
UAB	50
Buffalo	67
12	Cincinnati	73

Semifinals; November 21
Louisiana	61
Wyoming	70
Richmond	48
12	Cincinnati	75

Championship; November 22
Wyoming	53
12	Cincinnati	78
3rd Place Game
Louisiana	82
Richmond	76
