= 2011–12 Louisiana–Lafayette Ragin' Cajuns women's basketball team =

US college basketball team

2011–12 Louisiana–Lafayette Ragin' Cajuns women's basketball

Sun Belt Tournament, First Round (L, FIU 53-74)
- Conference: Sun Belt Conference
- West Division
- Record: 7-23 (1–15 Sun Belt)
- Head coach: Errol Rogers (5th season)
- Assistant coaches: Lori Morris; Nicholas Jeffers
- Home arena: Earl K. Long Gymnasium

2011–12 Sun Belt Conference women's basketball standings
	Conf.				Overall
Team	W		L	PCT	W		L	PCT
East Division
Middle Tennessee	16	–	0	1.000	26	–	7	.788
Florida Atlantic	11	–	5	.688	17	–	13	.567
FIU	10	–	6	.625	23	–	11	.676
South Alabama	9	–	7	.563	17	–	13	.567
Western Kentucky	5	–	11	.313	9	–	21	.300
Troy	1	–	15	.063	2	–	26	.071
West Division
Arkansas–Little Rock†	12	–	4	.750	20	–	13	.606
Denver	11	–	5	.688	19	–	12	.613
Louisiana–Monroe	7	–	9	.438	9	–	21	.300
North Texas	7	–	9	.438	15	–	16	.484
Arkansas State	6	–	10	.375	12	–	18	.400
Louisiana–Lafayette	1	–	15	.063	7	–	23	.233
† Tournament winner Rankings from Coaches

The 2011–12 Louisiana–Lafayette Ragin' Cajuns women's basketball team represented the University of Louisiana at Lafayette during the 2011–12 NCAA Division I women's basketball season. The Ragin' Cajuns were led by fifth-year head coach Errol Rogers; they played their double-header home games at the Cajundome with other games at the Earl K. Long Gymnasium, which is located on campus. They were members in the Sun Belt Conference. They finished the season 7-23, 1–15 in Sun Belt play to finish sixth place in the West Division. They were eliminated in the quarterfinals of the Sun Belt women's tournament.

Following the season, head coach Rogers resigned after going 38-113 in his five season at the helm of the program.

== Previous season ==
The Ragin' Cajuns finished the 2010–11 season 11–19, 4–12 in Sun Belt play to finish fifth in the West Division. They made it to the 2011 Sun Belt Conference women's basketball tournament, losing in the first round game by a score of 53-58 to the South Alabama Jaguars. They were not invited to any other postseason tournament.

== Roster ==
2011–12 Louisiana–Lafayette Ragin' Cajuns women's basketball team
Players
Coaches

Pos.	#	Name	Height	Year	Previous school	Hometown
G	00	Brandi Schambough	5 ft 6 in (1.68 m)	Jr	St. Thomas More HS	Youngsville, LA
G	1	Michelle Brunker	5 ft 8 in (1.73 m)	Sr	The Bishop's School	San Diego, CA
G	2	Brooklyn Arceneaux	5 ft 9 in (1.75 m)	Fr	St. Thomas More HS	Lafayette, LA
G	3	Robbie Brown	5 ft 8 in (1.73 m)	Fr	St. Thomas More HS	Lafayette, LA
G	4	Megan Whittaker	5 ft 8 in (1.73 m)	Fr	West Forsyth HS	Cumming, GA
G	11	Laurie Beaty	5 ft 6 in (1.68 m)	Fr	Thomas Jefferson HS	Tampa, FL
G	13	Krystal Motley	5 ft 7 in (1.7 m)	Sr	Mirabeau B. Lamar HS	Houston, TX
G	14	Bianca Davis	5 ft 3 in (1.6 m)	So	Cecilia HS	Cecilia, LA
G/F	15	Olivia Nino	6 ft 1 in (1.85 m)	RS Jr	Mainland HS; Central Florida CC	Daytona Beach, FL
F	22	Mercedes Johnson	5 ft 11 in (1.8 m)	Sr	Langham Creek HS	Houston, TX
C	23	Josie West	6 ft 2 in (1.88 m)	Jr	East Ascension HS	Gonzales, LA
F	24	Malik Stevenson	6 ft 1 in (1.85 m)	RS Fr	Winderbarrow HS; Paris JC	Winder, GA
G	32	Nicole Morris	5 ft 6 in (1.68 m)	Sr	Cy-Fair HS	Cypress, TX
F	42	Jean-Marie Allen	5 ft 10 in (1.78 m)	Jr	Ovey Comeaux HS	Lafayette, LA
C	55	Kemi Rotibi	6 ft 4 in (1.93 m)	Sr	Hillcrest HS; South Suburban	Chicago, IL

Head coach

- Errol Rogers (Louisiana)

Assistant coach(es)

- Lori Morris (San Diego)
- Tomekia Reed (Georgia Southwestern State)
- Nicholas Jeffers (McNeese State)
- Courtney Simmons (Louisville) - Recruiting Coordinator

Legend

- (C) Team captain
- (S) Suspended
- (I) Ineligible
- (W) Walk-on
- Injured
- Current redshirt

Roster
Last update: May 20, 2019

== Schedule and results ==
Date time, TV	Rank^{#}	Opponent^{#}	Result	Record	Site city, state
Non-conference regular season
11/14/2011*; 7:00 pm		LSU-Shreveport	L 50-63	0-1	Earl K. Long Gymnasium; Lafayette, LA
11/17/2011*; 7:00 pm		Nicholls State	L 64-72	0-2	Earl K. Long Gymnasium; Lafayette, LA
11/21/2011*; 7:00 pm		at McNeese State	L 59-80	0-3	Burton Coliseum; Lake Charles, LA
11/23/2011*; 9:00 pm		at UC Riverside	T 59-59	1-3	Student Recreation Center Arena; Riverside, CA
11/25/2011*; 9:00 pm		at San Diego	L 44-103	1-4	Jenny Craig Pavilion; San Diego, CA
11/29/2011*; 12:00 pm		at Southeastern Louisiana	W 69-57	2-4	University Center; Hammond, LA
12/03/2011*; 2:00 pm		Southern	W 60-49	3-4	Earl K. Long Gymnasium; Lafayette, LA
12/11/2011*; 2:00 pm		Southeastern Louisiana	W 63-54 ^{OT}	4-4	Earl K. Long Gymnasium; Lafayette, LA
12/14/2011*; 6:00 pm		at Savannah State	L 36-41	4-5	Tiger Arena; Savannah, GA
12/16/2011*; 4:30 pm		at Bethune-Cookman	W 72-67	5-5	Moore Gymnasium; Daytona Beach, FL
12/19/2011*; 7:00 pm		at Mississippi State	L 38-72	5-6	Humphrey Coliseum; Starkville, MS
12/22/2011*; 2:00 pm		Tulane	W 65-64 ^{OT}	5-7	Earl K. Long Gymnasium; Lafayette, LA
Sun Belt regular season
12/31/2011; 2:00 pm		Florida Atlantic	L 52-66	5-8 (0-1)	Cajundome; Lafayette, LA
01/04/2012; 11:00 am, Fox College Sports		at Western Kentucky	L 45-49	5-9 (0-2)	E. A. Diddle Arena; Bowling Green, KY
01/07/2012; 3:00 pm		at Middle Tennessee	L 53-104	5-10 (0-3)	Monte Hale Arena; Murfreesboro, TN
01/11/2012; 7:00 pm		South Alabama	L 68-72	5-11 (0-4)	Earl K. Long Gymnasium; Lafayette, LA
01/14/2012; 5:00 pm		FIU	L 48-78	5-12 (0-5)	Cajundome; Lafayette, LA
01/18/2012; 7:00 pm		at Arkansas-Little Rock	L 45-56	5-13 (0-6)	Jack Stephens Center; Little Rock, AR
01/21/2012; 3:05 pm		at Arkansas State	L 52-55	5-14 (0-7)	Convocation Center; Jonesboro, AR
01/25/2012; 5:00 pm		North Texas	L 45-66	5-15 (0-8)	Cajundome; Lafayette, LA
01/28/2012; 2:00 pm		at Louisiana-Monroe	L 35-66	5-16 (0-9)	Fant-Ewing Coliseum; Monroe, LA
02/01/2012; 7:00 pm		Denver	L 39-76	5-17 (0-10)	Earl K. Long Gymnasium; Lafayette, LA
02/04/2012; 5:15 pm		at Troy	L 52-58	5-18 (0-11)	Trojan Arena; Troy, AL
02/08/2012; 7:00 pm		Arkansas-Little Rock	L 41-55	5-19 (0-12)	Earl K. Long Gymnasium; Lafayette, LA
02/11/2012; 5:00 pm		Arkansas State	L 50-57	5-20 (0-13)	Cajundome; Lafayette, LA
02/15/2012; 8:00 pm		at Denver	L 47-71	5-21 (0-14)	Magness Arena; Denver, CO
02/18/2012; 1:00 pm		at North Texas	L 40-78	5-22 (0-15)	UNT Coliseum; Denton, TX
Non-conference regular season
02/20/2012*; 2:00 pm		Nebraska-Omaha	W 62-60 ^{OT}	6-22	Earl K. Long Gymnasium; Lafayette, LA
Sun Belt regular season
02/25/2012; 5:00 pm		Louisiana-Monroe	W 82-65	7-22 (1-15)	Cajundome; Lafayette, LA
Sun Belt Women's Tournament (0-1)
03/03/2012; 12:00 pm		vs. FIU	L 53-74	7-23	Summit Arena; Hot Springs, AR
*Non-conference game. ^{#}Rankings from AP Poll. (#) Tournament seedings in parentheses. All times are in Central Time.

== See also ==
- 2011–12 Louisiana–Lafayette Ragin' Cajuns men's basketball team
