= 2010–11 Louisiana–Lafayette Ragin' Cajuns women's basketball team =

Intercollegiate basketball season

2010–11 Louisiana–Lafayette Ragin' Cajuns women's basketball

Sun Belt Tournament, First Round (L, South Alabama 53-58)
- Conference: Sun Belt Conference
- West Division
- Record: 11–19 (4–12 Sun Belt)
- Head coach: Errol Rogers (4th season)
- Assistant coaches: Lori Morris; Tomekia Reed; Nicholas Jeffers; Jaye Nayreau
- Home arena: Earl K. Long Gymnasium

2010–11 Sun Belt Conference women's basketball standings
	Conf.				Overall
Team	W		L	PCT	W		L	PCT
East Division
Middle Tennessee	14	–	2	.875	23	–	8	.742
FIU	10	–	6	.625	16	–	16	.500
Western Kentucky	9	–	7	.563	15	–	17	.469
South Alabama	8	–	8	.500	17	–	13	.567
Florida Atlantic	4	–	12	.250	7	–	21	.250
Troy	2	–	14	.125	5	–	25	.167
West Division
Arkansas–Little Rock†	14	–	2	.875	23	–	8	.742
Denver	11	–	5	.688	19	–	12	.613
Louisiana–Monroe	9	–	7	.563	16	–	15	.516
Arkansas State	9	–	7	.563	18	–	14	.563
Louisiana–Lafayette	4	–	12	.250	11	–	19	.367
North Texas	2	–	14	.125	5	–	25	.167
† Tournament winner Rankings from Coaches

The 2010–11 Louisiana–Lafayette Ragin' Cajuns women's basketball team represented the University of Louisiana at Lafayette during the 2010–11 NCAA Division I women's basketball season. The Ragin' Cajuns were led by fourth-year head coach Errol Rogers; they played their double-header home games at the Cajundome with other games at the Earl K. Long Gymnasium, which is located on campus. They were members in the Sun Belt Conference. They finished the season 11–19, 4–12 in Sun Belt play to finish fifth place in the West Division. They were eliminated in the first round of the Sun Belt women's tournament.

== Previous season ==
The Ragin' Cajuns finished the 2009–10 season 10–22, 4–14 in Sun Belt play to finish in a three-way-tie for fifth place in the West Division. They made it to the 2010 Sun Belt Conference women's basketball tournament, losing in the first round game by a score of 76-82 to the South Alabama Jaguars. They were not invited to any other postseason tournament.

== Roster ==
2010–11 Louisiana–Lafayette Ragin' Cajuns women's basketball team
Players
Coaches

Pos.	#	Name	Height	Year	Previous school	Hometown
G	00	Brandi Schambough	5 ft 6 in (1.68 m)	So	St. Thomas More HS	Youngsville, LA
G	1	Michelle Brunker	5 ft 8 in (1.73 m)	Jr	The Bishop's School	San Diego, CA
G	2	Jasmine Barnes	5 ft 7 in (1.7 m)	Sr	Broadmoor HS	Baton Rouge, LA
G	3	Amber Ventroy	5 ft 5 in (1.65 m)	RS Fr	Lafayette HS	Lafayette, LA
G	5	Danyell Oliver	5 ft 6 in (1.68 m)	Jr	Kilgore College	Kilgore, TX
G	13	Krystal Motley	5 ft 7 in (1.7 m)	Jr	Mirabeau B. Lamar HS	Houston, TX
G	14	Bianca Davis	5 ft 3 in (1.6 m)	RS Fr	Cecilia HS	Cecilia, LA
G/F	15	Olivia Nino	6 ft 1 in (1.85 m)	Jr	Mainland HS; Central Florida CC	Daytona Beach, FL
G	21	Danielle Smith	5 ft 9 in (1.75 m)	Jr	Ramona HS; San Jacinto CC	Ramona, CA
F	22	Mercedes Johnson	5 ft 11 in (1.8 m)	Jr	Langham Creek HS	Houston, TX
C	23	Josie West	6 ft 2 in (1.88 m)	So	East Ascension HS	Gonzales, LA
G	25	D'Mya Clay	5 ft 8 in (1.73 m)	RS Sr	Columbus East HS	Columbus, IN
G	32	Nicole Morris	5 ft 6 in (1.68 m)	Jr	Cy-Fair HS	Cypress, TX
F	33	Lyndra Bell	5 ft 10 in (1.78 m)	Sr	Teurlings Catholic HS	Lafayette, LA
F	42	Jean-Marie Allen	5 ft 10 in (1.78 m)	So	Ovey Comeaux HS	Lafayette, LA
C	55	Kemi Rotibi	6 ft 4 in (1.93 m)	Jr	Hillcrest HS; South Suburban	Chicago, IL

Head coach

- Errol Rogers (Louisiana)

Assistant coach(es)

- Lori Morris (San Diego)
- Tomekia Reed (Georgia Southwestern State)
- Nicholas Jeffers (McNeese State)
- Jaye Nayreau (took Reed's position) (Sam Houston State)
- Courtney Simmons (Louisville) - Recruiting Coordinator

Legend

- (C) Team captain
- (S) Suspended
- (I) Ineligible
- (W) Walk-on
- Injured
- Current redshirt

Roster
Last update: July 8, 2019

== Schedule and results ==
Date time, TV	Rank^{#}	Opponent^{#}	Result	Record	Site city, state
Non-conference regular season
11/15/2010*; 5:00 pm		LSU-Shreveport	W 74-67	1-0	Cajundome; Lafayette, LA
11/20/2010*; 1:00 pm		UAB	L 46-58	1-1	Earl K. Long Gymnasium; Lafayette, LA
11/23/2010*; 5:30 pm		at Southern	L 65-75	1-2	F. G. Clark Center; Baton Rouge, LA
11/26/2010*; 5:00 pm		vs. Southern Miss; Lady Eagle Thanksgiving Classic	L 73-76	1-3	Reed Green Coliseum; Hattiesburg, MS
11/27/2010*; 2:00 pm		vs. Murray State; Lady Eagle Thanksgiving Classic	W 79-66	2-3	Reed Green Coliseum; Hattiesburg, MS
11/29/2010*; 6:00 pm		at New Orleans	W 88-27	3-3	Lakefront Arena; New Orleans, LA
12/02/2010*; 7:00 pm		McNeese State	L 52-65	3-4	Earl K. Long Gymnasium; Lafayette, LA
12/05/2010*; 2:00 pm		Southeastern Louisiana	W 67-57	4-4	Earl K. Long Gymnasium; Lafayette, LA
12/12/2010*; 2:00 pm		at Centenary	W 90-74	5-4	Gold Dome; Shreveport, LA
12/13/2010*; 7:00 pm		Bethune-Cookman	L 61-63	5-5	Earl K. Long Gymnasium; Lafayette, LA
12/17/2010*; 6:00 pm		Savannah State	W 63-58	6-5	Earl K. Long Gymnasium; Lafayette, LA
12/19/2010*; 12:00 pm		New Orleans	W 80-63	7-5	Cajundome; Lafayette, LA
12/21/2010*; 7:00 pm		at Southeastern Louisiana	L 52-56	7-6	University Center; Hammond, LA
Sun Belt regular season
12/29/2010; 8:00 am		at Denver	L 58-70	7-7 (0-1)	Magness Arena; Denver, CO
01/01/2011; 2:00 pm		at North Texas	W 65-54	8-7 (1-1)	UNT Coliseum; Denton, TX
01/05/2011; 7:00 pm		Troy	W 73-63	9-7 (2-1)	Earl K. Long Gymnasium; Lafayette, LA
01/08/2011; 2:00 pm		Middle Tennessee	L 62-84	9-8 (2-2)	Earl K. Long Gymnasium; Lafayette, LA
01/12/2011; 7:05 pm		at Arkansas State	L 70-80	9-9 (2-3)	Convocation Center; Jonesboro, AR
01/15/2011; 4:30 pm		at Arkansas–Little Rock	L 40-51	9-10 (2-4)	Jack Stephens Center; Little Rock, AR
01/22/2011; 2:00 pm		Louisiana–Monroe	L 65-76	9-11 (2-5)	Earl K. Long Gymnasium; Lafayette, LA
01/26/2011; 7:00 pm		North Texas	W 71-69	10-11 (3-5)	Earl K. Long Gymnasium; Lafayette, LA
01/30/2011; 12:00 pm		at South Alabama	L 66-82	10-12 (3-6)	Mitchell Center; Mobile, AL
02/05/2011; 2:00 pm		Arkansas–Little Rock	L 52-57	10-13 (3-7)	Earl K. Long Gymnasium; Lafayette, LA
02/09/2011; 5:00 pm		at FIU	L 52-62	10-14 (3-8)	U. S. Century Bank Arena; Miami, FL
02/12/2011; 2:00 pm		at Florida Atlantic	W 85-78	11-14 (4-8)	FAU Arena; Boca Raton, FL
02/16/2011; 7:00 pm		Arkansas State	L 44-66	11-15 (4-9)	Earl K. Long Gymnasium; Lafayette, LA
02/19/2011; 2:00 pm		Western Kentucky	L 49-69	11-16 (4-10)	Earl K. Long Gymnasium; Lafayette, LA
02/24/2011; 5:00 pm		Denver	L 39-82	11-17 (4-11)	Cajundome; Lafayette, LA
02/26/2011; 4:00 pm		at Louisiana–Monroe	L 55-70	11-18 (4-12)	Fant–Ewing Coliseum; Monroe, LA
Sun Belt Women's Tournament
03/05/2011; 2:40 pm		vs. South Alabama; First Round/Quarterfinals	L 53-58	11-19	Summit Arena; Hot Springs, AR
*Non-conference game. ^{#}Rankings from AP Poll. (#) Tournament seedings in parentheses. All times are in Central Time.

== See also ==
- 2010–11 Louisiana–Lafayette Ragin' Cajuns men's basketball team
