= 2009–10 Savannah State Lady Tigers basketball team =

Intercollegiate basketball season

2009–10 Savannah State Lady Tigers basketball
- Conference: NCAA Division I independent schools (basketball)
- I
- Record: 9-21 ( Independent)
- Head coach: Cedric Hardy
- Assistant coaches: Billy Hamilton; Sonya Wilson
- Home arena: Tiger Arena

The 2009–10 Savannah State Lady Tigers basketball team competed in American basketball on behalf of Savannah State University and had a record of 9-21. The Lady Tigers were members of the NCAA Division I-AA, as an independent. The head coach was Cedric Hardy, who served his sixth year. The team played its home games at Tiger Arena in Savannah, Georgia. The Lady Tigers entered the season seeking to improve on the 9–22 record posted in the 2008–09 season.

== Coaching staff ==
Name	Type	College	Graduating year
Cedric Baker	Head coach	Voorhees College	1990
Billy Hamilton	Assistant coach	Albany State University	2008
Sonya Wilson	Assistant coach	South Carolina State University	1994

== Roster ==
SSU Women's Basketball Current Roster
Head coach: Cedric Hardy
Pos.	No.	Name	Class	Height	Hometown
G	4	Kymberli Stamps	Sophomore	5-10	Columbus, GA
F	5	Deanna Newton	Freshman	5-5	Mt. Pleasant, TX
G	10	Courtney Long	Junior	5-9	Bowdon, GA
G	12	Ashlee Barley	Sophomore	5-7	Columbus, GA
G	15	Crissa Jackson	Sophomore	5-7	Columbus, GA
F	20	Alisha Nelson	Sophomore	6-3	Phenix City, AL
G	21	Brittany Gilbert	Freshman	5-9	Albany, GA
F	22	Darice Fountain	Freshman	5-11	Wichita, KS
F	23	Latoya Ashley	Sophomore	5-10	Augusta, GA
F	24	Carlita Johnson	Sophomore	6-0	Fort Lauderdale, FL
G	25	Mattisha Mangum	Freshman	5-6	Durham, N.C.
F	32	Raven James	Sophomore	6-0	Phenix City, AL
G	33	Treasure Monroe	Junior	5-4	Kingsland, GA
C	34	Whitney Elliot	Freshman	6-2	Savannah, GA
F	50	Gabrielle Bennett	Freshman	5-5	Rock Hill, S.C.
C	55	Renetta Phillips	Freshman	5-5	Marshall, TX

== Schedule ==
Date time, TV	Rank^{#}	Opponent^{#}	Result	Record	Site city, state
November 13*; 6:00 p.m.		Edward Waters	W 48-42	1-0	Tiger Arena; Savannah, GA
November 15*; 4:00 p.m.		at South Carolina State	L 50–60	1-1	SHM Memorial Center; Orangeburg, S.C.
November 17*; 7:00 p.m.		Allen	W 78-39	2-1	Tiger Arena; Savannah, GA
November 19*; 6:00 p.m.		Florida A&M	L 38-41	2-2	Teaching Gym; Tallahassee, FL
November 22*; 2:00 p.m.		at Southeastern Louisiana	W 60-50	3-2	Tiger Arena; Savannah, GA
November 25*; 7:00 p.m.		Stetson	W 54-49	4-2	Tiger Arena; Savannah, GA
November 28*; 4:00 p.m.		Columbia College	W 77-21	5-2	Tiger Arena; Savannah, GA
November 30*; 5:30 p.m.		at Alabama State	W 50-49	6-2	ASU Acadome; Montgomery, AL
December 5*; 7:00 p.m.		Coastal Carolina	L 35-49	6-3	Tiger Arena; Savannah, GA
December 13*; 3:00 p.m.		Alabama State	W 45-36	7-3	Tiger Arena; Savannah, GA
December 15*; 7:00 p.m.		Norfolk State	L 45–57	7-4	Tiger Arena; Savannah, GA
December 17*; 7:00 p.m.		vs. Jacksonville State; University of North Florida Classic	W 51-37	8-4	UNF Arena; Jacksonville, FL
December 18*; 5:00 p.m.		vs. North Florida; University of North Florida Classic	L 42–56	8-5	UNF Arena; Jacksonville, FL
December 20*; 5:00 p.m.		at Coastal Carolina	L 41–57	8-6	Kimbel Arena; Conway, SC
December 22*; 5:00 p.m.		at Charleston Southern	L 51–66	8-7	CSU Field House; Charleston, SC
December 30*; 7:00 p.m.		Georgia	L 45–80	8-8	Tiger Arena; Savannah, GA
January 2*; 12:00 noon		at Texas Tech	L 40–69	8-9	United Spirit Arena; Lubbock, TX
January 4*; 7:00 p.m.		South Carolina State	L 49–60	8-10	Tiger Arena; Savannah, GA
January 6*; 7:00 p.m.		Florida A&M	L 53–60	8-11	Tiger Arena; Savannah, GA
January 9*; 2:00 p.m.		Louisiana–Lafayette	L 35–53	8-12	Tiger Arena; Savannah, GA
January 12*; 7:00 p.m.		Charleston Southern	L 36–69	8-13	Tiger Arena; Savannah, GA
January 18*; 4:00 p.m.		at North Carolina Central	L 46–50	8-14	McLendon-McDougald Gymnasium; Durham, NC
January 21*; 7:00 p.m.		at No. 22 Georgia Tech	L 51–80	8-15	Alexander Memorial Coliseum; Atlanta, GA
January 27*; 7:00 p.m.		at College of Charleston	L 48–68	8-16	Carolina First Arena; Charleston, SC
January 30*; 2:00 p.m.		at North Carolina Central	L 43–54	8-17	Tiger Arena; Savannah, GA
February 6*; 1:00 p.m.		NJIT	W 54-51	9-17	Tiger Arena; Savannah, GA
February 11*; 7:00 p.m.		at Virginia Tech	L 41–68	9-18	Cassell Coliseum; Blacksburg, VA
February 13*; 2:00 p.m.		at Longwood	L 48–79	9-19	Willett Hall; Farmville, VA
February 20*; 2:00 p.m.		Longwood	L 36–60	9-20	Tiger Arena; Savannah, GA
February 28*; 4:00 p.m.		Morris	L 50–55	9-21	Tiger Arena; Savannah, GA
*Non-conference game. ^{#}Rankings from AP Poll. (#) Tournament seedings in parentheses. All times are in Eastern Time.

== Awards ==
- Sophomore guard Crissa Jackson was named to the 2010 All Independent Second Team on March 31, 2010.

== See also ==
- 2009–10 Savannah State Tigers basketball team
