= 2009–10 Louisiana–Lafayette Ragin' Cajuns women's basketball team =

Intercollegiate basketball season

2009–10 Louisiana–Lafayette Ragin' Cajuns women's basketball

Sun Belt Tournament, First Round (L, South Alabama 76-82)
- Conference: Sun Belt Conference
- West Division
- Record: 10–22 (4–14 Sun Belt)
- Head coach: Errol Rogers (3rd season)
- Assistant coaches: Lori Morris; Tomekia Reed
- Home arena: Earl K. Long Gymnasium

2009–10 Sun Belt Conference women's basketball standings
	Conf.				Overall
Team	W		L	PCT	W		L	PCT
East Division
Middle Tennessee†	17	–	1	.944	25	–	6	.806
Western Kentucky	14	–	4	.778	21	–	11	.656
Florida Atlantic	10	–	8	.556	14	–	15	.483
FIU	9	–	9	.500	14	–	16	.467
South Alabama	9	–	9	.500	15	–	16	.484
Troy	5	–	13	.278	12	–	17	.414
West Division
Arkansas–Little Rock	17	–	1	.944	27	–	6	.818
Denver	12	–	6	.667	18	–	13	.581
Arkansas State	7	–	11	.389	13	–	18	.419
North Texas	5	–	13	.278	9	–	22	.290
New Orleans	4	–	14	.222	12	–	20	.375
Louisiana–Monroe	4	–	14	.222	10	–	19	.345
Louisiana–Lafayette	4	–	14	.222	10	–	22	.313
† Tournament winner Rankings from Coaches

The 2009–10 Louisiana–Lafayette Ragin' Cajuns women's basketball team represented the University of Louisiana at Lafayette during the 2009–10 NCAA Division I women's basketball season. The Ragin' Cajuns were led by third-year head coach Errol Rogers; they played their double-header home games at the Cajundome with other games at the Earl K. Long Gymnasium, which is located on campus. They were members in the Sun Belt Conference. They finished the season 10–22, 4–14 in Sun Belt play to finish in a three-way tie for fifth place in the West Division. They were eliminated in the first round of the Sun Belt women's tournament.

== Previous season ==
The Ragin' Cajuns finished the 2008–09 season 4–27, 0–18 in Sun Belt play to finish in seventh place in the West Division. They made it to the 2009 Sun Belt Conference women's basketball tournament, losing in the first round game by a score of 65-68 to the Troy Trojans. They were not invited to any other postseason tournament.

== Roster ==
2009–10 Louisiana–Lafayette Ragin' Cajuns women's basketball team
Players
Coaches

Pos.	#	Name	Height	Year	Previous school	Hometown
G	00	Brandi Schambough	5 ft 6 in (1.68 m)	RS Fr	St. Thomas More HS	Youngsville, LA
G	1	Michelle Brunker	5 ft 8 in (1.73 m)	So	The Bishop's School	San Diego, CA
G	2	Jasmine Barnes	5 ft 7 in (1.7 m)	So	Broadmoor HS	Baton Rouge, LA
G	4	Nicki Talbert	5 ft 6 in (1.68 m)	RS Fr	Southern Lab	Baton Rouge, LA
G	11	Becky Hall	5 ft 3 in (1.6 m)	So	Lacassine HS	Iowa, LA
G	13	Krystal Motley	5 ft 7 in (1.7 m)	So	Mirabeau B. Lamar HS	Houston, TX
G	14	Jamie Gunter	5 ft 9 in (1.75 m)	RS Fr	Columbus HS	Columbus, MS
F	21	Jean-Marie Allen	5 ft 9 in (1.75 m)	RS Fr	Comeaux HS	Lafayette, LA
G	21	D'Mya Clay	5 ft 8 in (1.73 m)	Jr	Columbus East HS	Columbus, IN
F	22	Mercedes Johnson	5 ft 11 in (1.8 m)	So	Langham Creek HS	Houston, TX
C	23	Josie West	6 ft 2 in (1.88 m)	RS Fr	East Ascension HS	Gonzales, LA
F	24	Jessica Sigue	5 ft 9 in (1.75 m)	RS Jr	New Iberia Senior HS	New Iberia, LA
G	32	Nicole Morris	5 ft 6 in (1.68 m)	So	Cy-Fair HS	Cypress, TX
F	33	Lyndra Bell	5 ft 10 in (1.78 m)	Jr	Teurlings Catholic HS	Lafayette, LA
F	34	Alexis Green	5 ft 8 in (1.73 m)	Sr	Dallas Skyline HS	Dallas, TX
F	42	Ernisha Freeman	6 ft 1 in (1.85 m)	RS Fr	Immokalee HS	Immokalee, FL
F	50	Amy Richard	6 ft 1 in (1.85 m)	Sr	Rosary HS; Fullerton JC	Opelousas, LA

Head coach

- Errol Rogers (Louisiana)

Assistant coach(es)

- Paula Lee (LSU)
- Lori Morris (San Diego)
- Tomekia Reed (Georgia Southwestern State)
- Courtney Simmons (Louisville) - Recruiting Coordinator

Legend

- (C) Team captain
- (S) Suspended
- (I) Ineligible
- (W) Walk-on
- Injured
- Current redshirt

Roster
Last update: July 13, 2019

== Schedule and results ==
Date time, TV	Rank^{#}	Opponent^{#}	Result	Record	Site city, state
Non-conference regular season
11/14/2009*; 5:00 pm		Texas Southern	W 64-57	1-0	Cajundome; Lafayette, LA
11/16/2009*; 5:00 pm		LSU–Shreveport	W 65-63	2-0	Cajundome; Lafayette, LA
11/21/2009*; 2:00 pm		Southern	L 51-62	2-1	Earl K. Long Gymnasium; Lafayette, LA
11/27/2009*; 4:30 pm		vs. Lamar; World Vision Classic	L 58-66	2-2	Ferrell Center; Waco, TX
11/28/2009*; 12:00 pm		vs. Baylor; World Vision Classic	L 42-89	2-3	Ferrell Center; Waco, TX
11/29/2009*; 12:00 pm		vs. Idaho	L 66-90	2-4	Ferrell Center; Waco, TX
12/02/2009*; 7:00 pm		at McNeese State	W 82-68	3-4	Burton Coliseum; Lake Charles, LA
12/05/2009*; 3:00 pm		at Southeastern Louisiana	L 58-62	3-5	University Center; Hammond, LA
12/12/2009*; 2:00 pm		Southeastern Louisiana	L 61-72	3-6	Cajundome; Lafayette, LA
12/15/2009*; 4:30 pm		vs. North Carolina A&T; Sue Gunter Classic (hosted by: LSU)	L 79-85	3-7	Pete Maravich Assembly Center; Baton Rouge, LA
12/16/2009*; 4:30 pm		vs. Houston Baptist; Sue Gunter Classic (hosted by: LSU)	W 86-76	4-7	Pete Maravich Assembly Center; Baton Rouge, LA
Sun Belt regular season
12/19/2009; 2:00 pm		Florida Atlantic	L 60-75	4-8 (0-1)	Earl K. Long Gymnasium; Lafayette, LA
Non–conference regular season
12/21/2009*; 2:00 pm		Centenary	W 77-50	5-8	Earl K. Long Gymnasium; Lafayette, LA
Sun Belt regular season
12/31/2009; 2:00 pm		at Western Kentucky	L 52-74	5-9 (0-2)	E. A. Diddle Arena; Bowling Green, KY
01/03/2010; 2:00 pm		at Middle Tennessee	L 54-83	5-10 (0-3)	Murphy Center; Murfreesboro, TN
01/06/2010; 7:00 pm		North Texas	W 80-78	6-10 (1-3)	Earl K. Long Gymnasium; Lafayette, LA
Non-conference regular season
01/09/2010*; 1:00 pm		at Savannah State	W 53-35	7-10	Tiger Arena; Savannah, GA
Sun Belt regular season
01/13/2010; 7:00 pm		Denver	L 66-75	7-11 (1-4)	Earl K. Long Gymnasium; Lafayette, LA
01/16/2010; 4:30 pm		at Arkansas–Little Rock	L 38-88	7-12 (1-5)	Jack Stephens Center; Little Rock, AR
01/20/2010; 7:00 pm		New Orleans	W 47-44	8-12 (2-5)	Earl K. Long Gymnasium; Lafayette, LA
01/23/2010; 2:00 pm		Troy	W 70-67	9-12 (3-5)	Earl K. Long Gymnasium; Lafayette, LA
01/27/2010; 7:05 pm		at Arkansas State	L 56-67	9-13 (3-6)	Convocation Center; Jonesboro, AR
01/30/2010; 2:00 pm		at Louisiana–Monroe	L 61-68	9-14 (3-7)	Fant–Ewing Coliseum; Monroe, LA
02/03/2010; 7:00 pm		FIU	L 51-77	9-15 (3-8)	Earl K. Long Gymnasium; Lafayette, LA
02/06/2010; 2:00 pm		Arkansas–Little Rock	L 49-56	9-16 (3-9)	Earl K. Long Gymnasium; Lafayette, LA
02/10/2010; 6:00 pm		at Florida Atlantic	L 75-84	9-17 (3-10)	FAU Arena; Boca Raton, FL
02/13/2010; 5:05 pm		at South Alabama	L 59-79	9-18 (3-11)	Mitchell Center; Mobile, AL
02/17/2010; 7:00 pm		Arkansas State	L 58-87	9-19 (3-12)	Earl K. Long Gymnasium; Lafayette, LA
02/20/2010; 2:00 pm		Louisiana–Monroe	W 69-67	10-19 (4-12)	Earl K. Long Gymnasium; Lafayette, LA
02/24/2010; 7:00 pm		at North Texas	L 67-90	10-20 (4-13)	UNT Coliseum; Denton, TX
02/27/2010; 2:30 pm		at Denver	L 63-76	10-21 (4-14)	Magness Arena; Denver, CO
Sun Belt Women's Tournament
03/06/2010; 12:00 pm		vs. South Alabama; First Round/Quarterfinals	L 76-82	10-22	Summit Arena; Hot Springs, AR
*Non-conference game. ^{#}Rankings from AP Poll. (#) Tournament seedings in parentheses. All times are in Central Time.

== See also ==
- 2009–10 Louisiana–Lafayette Ragin' Cajuns men's basketball team
