= Larry Vickers (basketball) =

American basketball player and coach

Current position
- Title: Head coach
- Team: Auburn
- Conference: SEC
- Record: 15–17 (.469)

Biographical details
- Education: Norfolk State University

Playing career
- 2004–2008: Norfolk State

Coaching career (HC unless noted)

Men's basketball
- 2008–2013: Norfolk State (assistant)
- 2013–2016: Norfolk State (associate HC)

Women's basketball
- 2016: Norfolk State (interim)
- 2016–2025: Norfolk State
- 2025–present: Auburn

Head coaching record
- Overall: 192–116 (.623)

Accomplishments and honors

Championships
- 3 MEAC tournament (2023–2025); 4 MEAC regular season (2022–2025)

Awards
- Kay Yow Award (2025); 3× MEAC Coach of the Year (2023–2025)

Larry Vickers is the head coach for the Auburn Tigers women's basketball team. He was previously the head coach of Norfolk State for nine seasons from 2016 to 2025.

== College career ==
Vickers grew up in Virginia Beach, Virginia, and graduated from Ocean Lakes High School.

== Coaching career ==
=== Men's Basketball ===
At the conclusion of his playing career, Vickers would join his alma mater as an assistant coach in 2008. He'd then be promoted to associate head coach in 2013.

=== Women's Basketball ===
==== Norfolk State ====
In mid-January 2016, Vickers was named interim head coach of the Norfolk State Spartans women's basketball team after Debra Clark was reassigned after starting the season 0–16.

In March 2016, Vickers was hired as Spartans' new head coach after finishing the season 3–8 in 11 games under Vickers with five of the eight losses being by single digits.

==== Auburn ====
Vickers was announced as the new head coach of Auburn on March 23, 2025.

== Head coaching record ==
Record table
Season	Team	Overall	Conference	Standing	Postseason
Norfolk State Spartans (MEAC) (2016–2025)
2015–16	Norfolk State	3–8	3–7	T–12th	
2016–17	Norfolk State	15–15	9–7	T–4th	
2017–18	Norfolk State	18–11	11–5	4th	
2018–19	Norfolk State	17–15	10–6	T–4th	
2019–20	Norfolk State	19–11	12–4	T–2nd	Postseason cancelled due to the COVID-19 pandemic.
2020–21	Norfolk State	5–9	3–5	2nd (South)	
2021–22	Norfolk State	17–12	11–3	T–1st	WNIT First Round
2022–23	Norfolk State	26–7	11–3	1st	NCAA First Round
2023–24	Norfolk State	27–6	13–1	1st	NCAA First Round
2024–25	Norfolk State	30–5	14–0	1st	NCAA First Round
Norfolk State:		177–99 (.641)	97–41 (.703)		
Auburn Tigers (Southeastern Conference) (2025–present)
2025–26	Auburn	15–17	3–13	15th	
Auburn:		15–17 (.469)	3–13 (.188)		
Total:		192–116 (.623)			
