= Crissa Jackson =

American basketball player (born 1989)

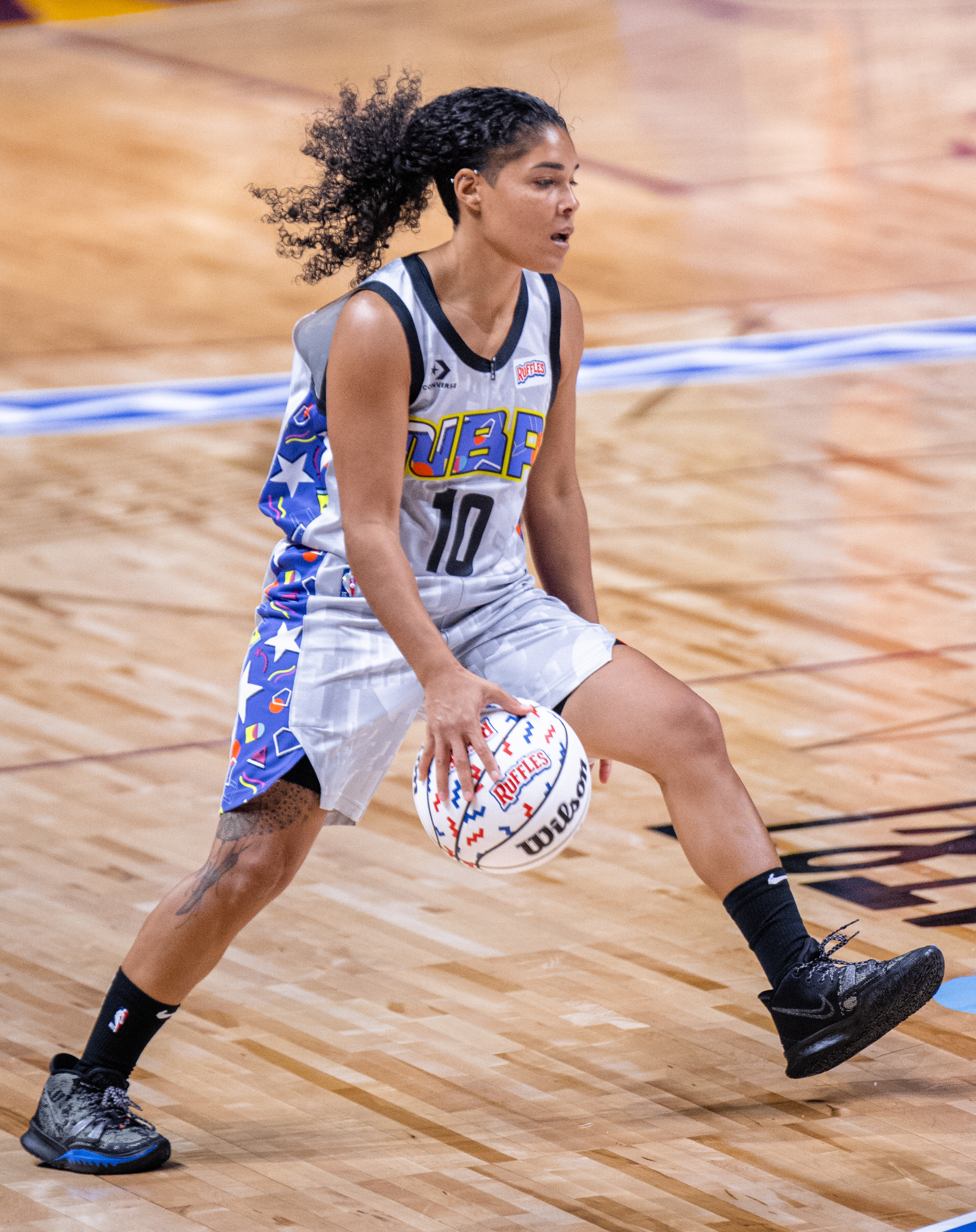

Personal information
- Born: October 26, 1989 (age 36) La Mesa, California, U.S.
- Listed height: 5 ft 7 in (1.70 m)

Career information
- High school: SciTech (Harrisburg, Pennsylvania); Mountain Ridge (Glendale, Arizona)
- College: Savannah State (2008–2010); Point Loma Nazarene (2010–2012)
- Position: Point guard

Career highlights
- Second-team All-Independent (2010)

Crissa Jackson (born October 26, 1989) is an American basketball player. She played college basketball for Savannah State University from 2008 to 2010 where she was named honorable mention on the 2008-09 NCAA Division I All-Independent Team as a freshman. Following her sophomore season, where she was named Second-team All-Independent after averaging 9.3 points and 3.5 assists, she transferred to and Point Loma Nazarene University where she finished her college career. In 2015, she became the 13th woman to play for the Harlem Globetrotters. In 2022, she participated in the fourth season of the TV-show The Circle.

== Career statistics ==
Legend
GP	Games played	GS	Games started	MPG	Minutes per game	RPG	Rebounds per game
APG	Assists per game	SPG	Steals per game	BPG	Blocks per game	PPG	Points per game
TO	Turnovers per game	FG%	Field-goal percentage	3P%	3-point field-goal percentage	FT%	Free-throw percentage
**Bold**	Career best	°	League leader

=== College ===
Year	Team	GP	GS	MPG	FG%	3P%	FT%	RPG	APG	SPG	BPG	TO	PPG
2008–09	Savannah State	30	-	-	**31.0**	**37.3**	**81.3**	1.8	2.5	1.8	0.0	-	6.4
2009–10	Savannah State	30	24	-	28.8	26.1	77.5	**2.9**	**3.5**	**1.9**	**0.1**	4.9	**9.3**
**Career**		60	24	-	29.7	24.8	78.8	2.3	3.0	1.8	0.0	4.9	7.9
Statistics retrieved from Sports-Reference.
