= 2008–09 Savannah State Lady Tigers basketball team =

Intercollegiate basketball season

2008–09 Savannah State Lady Tigers basketball
- Conference: NCAA Division I independent schools (basketball)
- I
- Record: 9–22 (0–0 Independent)
- Head coach: Cedric Hardy
- Assistant coaches: Julie Johnson; Josh Obiajunwa; LeTeisha Barnett
- Home arena: Tiger Arena

The 2008–09 Savannah State Lady Tigers basketball team competed in American basketball on behalf of Savannah State University. The Lady Tigers were members of the NCAA Division I-AA, as an independent. The head coach is Cedric Hardy, who served his fifth year. The team played its home games at Tiger Arena in Savannah, Georgia.

The Lady Tigers entered the season seeking to improve on the 14–15 record posted in the 2007–08 season, but finished with an 8–20 regular season record. The Lady Tigers were 1–2 in the Division I Women's Independent Tournament.

== Preseason notes ==
- April 19, 2008 – Ashlee Barley, Kymberli Stamps, Raven Fields, Shikerrie Turpin, and Alicia Nelson sign letters-of-intent with Savannah State University.
- May 22, 2008 – Darice Fountaine signed a letter-of-intent with Savannah State University.

== Roster ==
SSU Women's Basketball; Current Roster
Head coach: Cedric Hardy
| C | 4 | (United States) | Milan Johnson | Junior | 6–2 | Jonesboro, GA |
| G | 5 | (United States) | Antoinette Williams | Senior | 5–9 | Riverdale, GA |
| G | 10 | (United States) | Courtney Long | Sophomore | 5–9 | Bowdon, GA |
| G | 12 | (United States) | Ashlee Barley | Freshhman | 5–7 | Columbus, GA |
| G | 15 | (United States) | Crissa Jackson | Freshhman | 5–7 | Columbus, GA |
| F | 20 | (United States) | Alisha Nelson | Freshman | 6–3 | Phenix City, AL |
| G | 21 | (United States) | Kyhmberli Stamps | Freshman | 5–10 | Columbus, GA |
| F | 22 | (United States) | Shikerrie Turpin | Freshman | 5–11 | Columbus, GA |
| F | 23 | (United States) | Raven Fields | Freshman | 6–3 | Columbus, GA |
| F | 24 | (United States) | Carlita Johnson | Freshman | 6–0 | Fort Lauderdale, FL |
| G | 34 | (United States) | LaShara Smith | Senior | 5–8 | Daytona Beach, FL |
| F | 50 | (United States) | Nikki Robinson | Senior | 5–8 | Swainsboro, GA |

== Coaching staff ==
| Name | Type | College | Graduating year |
|---|---|---|---|
| Cedric Baker | Head coach | Voorhees College | 1990 |
| Julie Johnson | Assistant coach | Clark-Atlanta College | 1981 |
| Malik Jones | Assistant coach | Texas College | 2007 |
| Josh Obiajunwa | Assistant | Savannah State University | |
| LeTeisha Barnett | Graduate Assistant | Savannah State University | |

== Schedule ==
| Date time, TV | Rank^{#} | Opponent^{#} | Result | Record | Site city, state |
|---|---|---|---|---|---|
| November 15*; 4:00 pm | | Columbia College | W 81–47; Recap | 1–0 | Tiger Arena; Savannah, GA |
| November 17*; 7:00 pm | | Florida A&M | W 43–34; Recap | 1–1 | Tiger Arena; Savannah, GA |
| November 20*; 7:00 pm | | EWC | W 68–31; Recap | 2–1 | Tiger Arena; Savannah, GA |
| November 22*; 7:00 pm | | at UTEP | W 103–46 | 2–2 | Don Haskins Center; El Paso, TX |
| November 24*; 7:00 pm | | at Florida | W 75–55; Recap | 2–3 | Stephen C. O'Connell Center; Gainesville, FL |
| November 28*; 7:00 pm | | at Eastern Illinois; University of Cincinnati Invitational Tournament | W 62–40; Recap | 2–4 | Fifth Third Arena; Cincinnati, OH |
| November 29*; 7:00 pm | | at Cincinnati; University of Cincinnati Invitational Tournament | W 64–34; Recap | 2–5 | Fifth Third Arena; Cincinnati, OH |
| November 30*; 7:00 pm | | at Mississippi Valley State; University of Cincinnati Invitational Tournament | W 62–42; Recap | 2–6 | Fifth Third Arena; Cincinnati, OH |
| December 18*; 7:00 pm | | Charleston Southern | W 79–57 | 2–7 | Charleston, SC |
| December 21*; 2:00 pm | | at Southeastern Louisiana | W 73–60 | 2–8 | Hammond, LA |
| December 23*; 7:00 pm | | at Louisiana-Lafayette | W 69–42 | 2–9 | Lafayette, LA |
| December 30*; 4:00 pm | | Bethune-Cookman | W 58–57 | 3–9 | Tiger Arena; Savannah, GA |
| January 3*; 6:00 pm | | at Florida A&M | W 72–44 | 3–10 | Tallahassee, FL |
| January 5*; 5:00 pm | | at Bethune-Cookman | W 61–46 | 3–11 | Daytona, FL |
| January 11*; 3:00 pm | | at NJIT | W 65–56 | 3–12 | Tiger Arena; Savannah, GA |
| January 13*; 7:00 pm | | Charleston Southern | W 74–43 | 3–13 | Tiger Arena; Savannah, GA |
| January 15*; 7:00 pm | | at Georgia | L 28–74; Recap | 3–14 | Athens, GA |
| January 21*; 7:00 pm | | at College of Charleston | W 61–54 | 3–15 | Tiger Arena; Savannah, GA |
| January 24*; 2:00 pm | | at North Carolina Central | W 52–40 | 3–16 | Durham, NC |
| January 29*; 4:00 pm | | at Mississippi State | L 33–97; Recap | 3–17 | Starkville, MS |
| January 30*; 7:00 pm | | at Talladega | W 62–59 | 4–17 | Talladega, AL |
| February 2*; 7:00 pm | | at Texas Tech | L 39–80; Recap | 4–18 | Lubbock, TX |
| February 7*; 3:00 pm | | Longwood | W 61–49 | 5–18 | Tiger Arena; Savannah, GA |
| February 11*; 7:00 pm | | Georgia Tech | W 89–34 | 5–19 | Tiger Arena; Savannah, GA |
| February 14*; 5:30 pm | | at North Carolina Central | W 47–44 | 6–19 | Tiger Arena; Savannah, GA |
| February 22*; 6:00 pm | | Longwood | W 59–54; Recap | 7–19 | Farmville, VA |
| February 24*; 7:00 pm | | at NJIT | W 68–41 | 7–20 | Newark, NJ |
| February 28*; 4:00 pm | | Morris | W 69–65 Recap | 8–20 | Tiger Arena; Savannah, GA |
| March 5*; 4:50 pm | | vs. Chicago State University; Independent Colleges and Universities Tournament | W 74–39 | 8–21 | The McKay Center; Orem, UT |
| March 6*; 7:00 pm | | vs. NJIT; Independent Colleges and Universities Tournament | W 64–56 | 9–21 | The McKay Center; Orem, UT |
| March 7*; 4:30 pm | | vs. Longwood; Independent Colleges and Universities Tournament | W 76–60 | 9–22 | The McKay Center; Orem, UT |
*Non-conference game. ^{#}Rankings from AP Poll. (#) Tournament seedings in parentheses. All times are in Eastern Time.

== Awards ==
- Senior guard Lashara Smith and freshman point guard Crissa Jackson received an honorable mention on the 2008–09 Division I All Independent women's basketball team.
- LaShara Smith was selected as the Most Valuable Player for the 2008–09 season.

== See also ==
- 2008–09 Savannah State Tigers basketball team
