= Anthony Clement =

American football player (born 1976)

No. 65, 67, 68
- Position: Offensive tackle

Personal information
- Born: April 10, 1976 (age 50); Lafayette, Louisiana, U.S.
- Listed height: 6 ft 8 in (2.03 m)
- Listed weight: 320 lb (145 kg)

Career information
- High school: Cecilia (Cecilia, Louisiana)
- College: Louisiana-Lafayette
- NFL draft: 1998: 2nd round, 36th overall pick

Career history
- Arizona Cardinals (1998–2004); Denver Broncos (2005)*; San Francisco 49ers (2005); New York Jets (2006–2007); New England Patriots (2008)
- * Offseason or practice squad member only

Career NFL statistics
- Games played: 128
- Games started: 107
- Fumble recoveries: 4
- Stats at Pro Football Reference

Anthony George Clement (born April 10, 1976) is an American former professional football player who was an offensive tackle in the National Football League (NFL). He played college football for the Louisiana-Lafayette Ragin' Cajuns and was selected by the Arizona Cardinals in the second round of the 1998 NFL draft.

Clement also played for the San Francisco 49ers and New York Jets.

== Early life ==
Clement attended Cecilia High School in Cecilia, Louisiana, and was a letterman in football and track & field. In football, he was a starting defensive tackle and won All-District 6A honors, and All-Louisiana Class AAA honors.

== College career ==
Clement attended the University of Louisiana at Lafayette.

== Professional career ==
=== Arizona Cardinals ===
Clement was selected by the Arizona Cardinals in the second round (36th overall) of the 1998 NFL draft. He played for the Cardinals until the 2004 season when he was released.

=== San Francisco 49ers ===
He signed with the San Francisco 49ers but only played one season for them in 2005. He started just 6 games.

=== New York Jets ===
Clement was then signed by the New York Jets and played two seasons for them, in which he started every game. After the 2007 season Clement was released by the Jets.

=== New England Patriots ===
On July 21, Clement was signed by the New England Patriots. He was placed on injured reserve on August 3, 2008, and released from IR on September 10, 2008.
