= MEAC women's basketball tournament =

Mid-Eastern Athletic Conference women's basketball tournament
- Conference basketball championship
- Sport: Basketball
- Conference: Mid-Eastern Athletic Conference
- Number of teams: 8
- Format: Single-elimination tournament
- Played: 1978–79, 1982–present
- Current champion: Norfolk State (4th)
- Most championships: Howard (11)
- Official website: Mid-Eastern Athletic Conference Basketball

Host locations
- Greensboro, North Carolina; Philadelphia, Pennsylvania; Norfolk, Virginia; Baltimore, Maryland; Tallahassee, Florida; Richmond, Virginia; Raleigh, North Carolina; Winston-Salem, North Carolina

The MEAC women's basketball tournament is the conference championship tournament in women's basketball for the Mid-Eastern Athletic Conference (MEAC). It is a single-elimination tournament involving all 13 league members, and seeding is based on regular-season records with head-to-head match-up as a tie-breaker.

The winner receives the conference's automatic bid to the NCAA Division I women's basketball tournament.

== Results ==
Year	Champion	Score	Runner-up	Location
1978	South Carolina State (1)	85–70	Morgan State	Greensboro, NC
1979	South Carolina State (2)	76–56	Howard	Greensboro, NC
1980	Not held.			
1981	Not held.			
1982	Howard (1)	77–69	South Carolina State	Greensboro, NC
1983	South Carolina State (3)	65–64	Bethune–Cookman	Greensboro, NC
1984	Bethune–Cookman (1)	62–61 (OT)	South Carolina State	Greensboro, NC
1985	Howard (2)	No details		Philadelphia, PA
1986	South Carolina State (4)	59–57	Howard	Philadelphia, PA
1987	Howard (3)	62–57	South Carolina State	Greensboro, NC
1988	Howard (4)	83–57	North Carolina A&T	Greensboro, NC
1989	Howard (5)	83–57	North Carolina A&T	Greensboro, NC
1990	Howard (6)	84–60	Delaware State	Greensboro, NC
1991	Coppin State (1)	55–53	North Carolina A&T	Norfolk, VA
1992	South Carolina State (5)	69–44	Bethune–Cookman	Norfolk, VA
1993	South Carolina State (6)	65–54	Coppin State	Norfolk, VA
1994	North Carolina A&T (1)	76–67	Howard	Baltimore, MD
1995	Florida A&M	71–69	Howard	Baltimore, MD
1996	Howard (7)	65–46	North Carolina A&T	Tallahassee, FL
1997	Howard (8)	84–53	Florida A&M	Norfolk, VA
1998	Howard (9)	78–70	Hampton	Richmond, VA
1999	Florida A&M (2)	69–47	Hampton	Richmond, VA
2000	Hampton (1)	66–64	Norfolk State	Richmond, VA
2001	Howard (10)	86–83	Hampton	Richmond, VA
2002	Norfolk State (1)	61–52	Hampton	Richmond, VA
2003	Hampton (2)	69–57	Delaware State	Richmond, VA
2004	Hampton (3)	65–50	Delaware State	Richmond, VA
2005	Coppin State (2)	67–43	Norfolk State	Richmond, VA
2006	Coppin State (3)	46–36	Delaware State	Raleigh, NC
2007	Delaware State (1)	55–42	Morgan State	Raleigh, NC
2008	Coppin State (4)	72–70	North Carolina A&T	Raleigh, NC
2009	North Carolina A&T (2)	76–54	Hampton	Winston-Salem, NC
2010	Hampton (3)	57–46	South Carolina State	Winston-Salem, NC
2011	Hampton (4)	61–42	Howard	Winston-Salem, NC
2012	Hampton (5)	54–53	Howard	Winston-Salem, NC
2013	Hampton (6)	59–38	Howard	Norfolk, VA
2014	Hampton (7)	50–47	Coppin State	Norfolk, VA
2015	Savannah State (1)	65–47	Maryland Eastern Shore	Norfolk, VA
2016	North Carolina A&T (3)	65–46	Coppin State	Norfolk, VA
2017	Hampton (8)	52–49	Bethune–Cookman	Norfolk, VA
2018	North Carolina A&T (4)	72–65 (OT)	Hampton	Norfolk, VA
2019	Bethune–Cookman (2)	57–45	Norfolk State	Norfolk, VA
2020	Cancelled due to the coronavirus pandemic.			
2021	North Carolina A&T (5)	59–57	Howard	Norfolk, VA
2022	Howard (11)	61–44	Norfolk State	Norfolk, VA
2023	Norfolk State (2)	56–52	Howard	Norfolk, VA
2024	Norfolk State (3)	51–46	Howard	Norfolk, VA
2025	Norfolk State (4)	68-56	Howard	Norfolk, VA
2026	Howard (12)	53-46	Norfolk State	Norfolk, VA

== List of championships by school ==
School	Tournament Championships	Last Championship
Howard	12	1982, 1985, 1987, 1988, 1989, 1990, 1996, 1997, 1998, 2001, 2022, 2026
Hampton	9	2000, 2003, 2004, 2010, 2011, 2012, 2013, 2014, 2017
South Carolina State	6	1978, 1979, 1983, 1986, 1992, 1993
North Carolina A&T	5	1994, 2009, 2016, 2018, 2021
Norfolk State	4	2002, 2023, 2024, 2025
Coppin State	4	1991, 2005, 2006, 2008
Bethune–Cookman	2	1984, 2019
Florida A&M	2	1995, 1999
Delaware State	1	2007
Savannah State	1	2015

- Morgan State, Maryland Eastern Shore and North Carolina Central have not yet won a MEAC tournament.
- Winston-Salem State never won the tournament as a MEAC member.
- Schools highlighted in pink are former members of the MEAC

== See also ==
- MEAC men's basketball tournament
