= Raymond Calais =

American football player (born 1998)

Profile
- Position: Running back

Personal information
- Born: April 2, 1998 (age 28); Breaux Bridge, Louisiana, U.S.
- Listed height: 5 ft 9 in (1.75 m)
- Listed weight: 188 lb (85 kg)

Career information
- High school: Cecilia (St. Martin Parish, Louisiana)
- College: Louisiana (2016–2019)
- NFL draft: 2020: 7th round, 245th overall pick

Career history
- Tampa Bay Buccaneers (2020)*; Los Angeles Rams (2020–2021); DC Defenders (2023); BC Lions (2023)*; Michigan Panthers (2024)*
- * Offseason or practice squad member only

Awards and highlights
- Super Bowl champion (LVI); First-team All-Sun Belt (2019)

Career NFL statistics
- Return yards: 152
- Stats at Pro Football Reference

Raymond Calais Jr. (born April 2, 1998) is an American professional football running back. He played college football for the Louisiana Ragin' Cajuns, and was selected by the Tampa Bay Buccaneers in the seventh round of the 2020 NFL draft. He has also played for the Los Angeles Rams, DC Defenders, and Michigan Panthers.

== Early life ==
In his last year of high school at Cecilia High School, he was named the Louisiana Boys Track & Field Athlete of the Year after winning state in four different categories at the 4A level: individually in the 100 meter and 200 meter races, and as part of a team in the 4x100 and 4x200 relays. He was rated as a two star football recruit before committing to Louisiana-Lafayette, choosing the Ragin' Cajuns over Louisiana-Monroe.

== College career ==
During his senior season at Louisiana, Calais rushed for 886 yards on 117 attempts, recording six touchdowns. Calais also had 541 kick return yards for a Sun Belt Conference-best 28.5 yards per attempt. He earned First-team All-Sun Belt Conference honors as a return specialist and was Third-team as a running back. In his college career, he rushed for a total of 1,845 yards and 15 touchdowns and made 15 receptions for 145 yards and a touchdown. After his senior season, Calais participated in the NFLPA Collegiate Bowl.

== Professional career ==
Pre-draft measurables
Height	Weight	Arm length	Hand span	Wingspan	40-yard dash	10-yard split	20-yard split	Vertical jump	Broad jump	Bench press
5 ft 7 7/8 in (1.72 m)	188 lb (85 kg)	30 in (0.76 m)	9 1/4 in (0.23 m)	6 ft 1 3/4 in (1.87 m)	4.42 s	1.56 s	2.60 s	37.5 in (0.95 m)	10 ft 0 in (3.05 m)	20 reps
All values from NFL Combine

=== Tampa Bay Buccaneers ===
Calais was selected by the Tampa Bay Buccaneers with the 245th pick in the seventh round of the 2020 NFL draft. He was placed on the reserve/COVID-19 list by the team on July 31, 2020, and was activated six days later. Calais was waived by the Buccaneers on September 5, and was re-signed to the practice squad the following day.

=== Los Angeles Rams ===
On September 9, 2020, Calais was signed by the Los Angeles Rams off of the Buccaneers' practice squad. He was placed on injured reserve on January 8, 2021. Calais was waived/injured by Los Angeles on August 23, and placed on injured reserve. Calais won Super Bowl LVI when the Rams defeated the Cincinnati Bengals.

Calais was waived by the Rams on August 20, 2022.

=== DC Defenders ===
Calais signed with the DC Defenders of the XFL on March 14, 2023. Calais played in only one game for the Defenders, rushing once for a loss of four yards. He was released on April 5.

=== BC Lions ===
On April 19, 2023, Calais signed with the BC Lions of the Canadian Football League (CFL). He was an early cut at training camp and released on May 17.

=== Michigan Panthers ===
On November 6, 2023, Calais signed with the Michigan Panthers of the United States Football League (USFL). He was placed on the team's suspended list on March 10, 2024. Calais was waived by Michigan on July 18.
