= Ramsey Dardar =

American football player (born 1959)

No. 62
- Position: Defensive lineman

Personal information
- Born: October 3, 1959 (age 67); Cecilia, Louisiana, U.S.
- Listed height: 6 ft 2 in (1.88 m)
- Listed weight: 264 lb (120 kg)

Career information
- High school: Cecilia (LA)
- College: LSU
- NFL draft: 1983: 3rd round, 71st overall pick

Career history
- St. Louis Cardinals (1984); New York Giants (1986)*; Houston Oilers (1987)*
- * Offseason or practice squad member only

Awards and highlights
- First-team All-SEC (1982)

Career NFL statistics
- Games played: 16
- Games started: 6
- Stats at Pro Football Reference

James Ramsey Dardar (born October 3, 1959) is an American former professional football player who was a defensive lineman in the National Football League (NFL). He appeared in 16 NFL games, all for the 1984 St. Louis Cardinals, and he spent brief periods on the rosters of the New York Giants and Houston Oilers.

A native of Cecilia, Louisiana, Dardar was named to the 1982 All-Southeastern Conference football team while playing defensive tackle for Louisiana State University (LSU). He reached the school's top five all-time in career sacks and was part of the LSU team that went to the 1983 Orange Bowl. He was selected by the New Jersey Generals in the third round of the 1983 USFL draft, but he decided to sign with the Cardinals after they selected him in the third round (71st overall) of the 1983 NFL draft.

After missing all of the 1983 season with an injury, Dardar played in 16 games for the 1984 Cardinals, starting six of them. The team released him before the 1985 season, and he did not play football that year. He was signed by the New York Giants and the Houston Oilers in 1986 and 1987, respectively, but he was cut from both teams before playing any regular-season games. Injuries ended his career in 1987. The same year, his two-year-old son was killed in an auto-pedestrian accident.

Dardar became addicted to crack cocaine during his time in professional football, and after his playing days he turned to burglary to make money for drugs. He has been in prison for burglaries for much of his post-NFL life. The third time he was sent to prison, in late 1997, he was sentenced to 32 years. He was paroled in 2017.

== Early life ==
Dardar was the youngest of four children and grew up on a farm in rural Louisiana. He grew up with a Breaux Bridge address and attended school in nearby Cecilia, so football fans from both communities have claimed Dardar as one of their hometown players. Dardar is of African, Native American and French ancestry. His father, a laborer, spoke French and only a few words of English. Dardar said that he spoke only French himself until he started school. As a child, he spent much of his time fishing and riding horses.

At Cecilia High School, Dardar participated in football, basketball and track. He once threw a shot put 59 feet, setting a state record. In the spring of 1979, Dardar threw a discus more than 156 feet to establish a new St. Martin Parish record. He received All-State honors in track that year. The same year, he averaged 18.5 points per game in basketball, earning Second Team All-Acadiana honors. In football, Dardar had been named the defensive most valuable player in a fall 1978 St. Martin Parish coaches poll, and Cecilia High School finished tied for the District 5-AAA championship with a 9–1 win–loss record. Dardar later said that high school football taught him versatility, as he might be expected to play any position other than quarterback, depending on the opponent.

Heavily recruited by college football programs, Dardar was thinking of attending the University of Houston or the University of Oklahoma, but Charlie Pevey, the offensive coordinator under LSU coach Charles McClendon, convinced him to come to LSU. Dardar signed letters of intent with LSU, Southern University and Northwestern State University, but he said he never intended to go to Southern or Northwestern State; he just wanted coaches from those schools to stop bothering him.

== LSU ==
Dardar enrolled at LSU in 1979 to play defensive tackle. He injured cartilage and ligaments in his knee before the season started, so he was sent to the junior varsity team for rehabilitation. Though he made it back to the varsity team during the season, Dardar never played in a game, and he criticized defensive line coach Lynn LeBlanc for convincing him during team practices that he would be playing. While Dardar was frustrated by his lack of playing time, he said he was determined to play for LSU rather than transferring to another school.

At the start of the 1980 season, Dardar was playing right tackle as a backup to Leonard Marshall, but after he played well in the opening game of the season against Florida State, he was named to the first team. When announcing that decision, LSU head coach Jerry Stovall said that Dardar had gotten involved in more big defensive plays than Marshall in the Florida State game. In Dardar's first game as a starter, a 21–0 win against Kansas State on September 13, he recorded seven tackles, blocked a field goal attempt, and registered a fourth-down quarterback sack at the goal line. He ended the season with 77 tackles (nine tackles for loss) and five sacks.

Going into the 1981 season, Bill Elko joined the LSU defensive line as a transfer from Arizona State, but Dardar and Marshall were the starters at defensive tackle, while Greg Bowser and Terry Roussel competed for the starting position at nose guard. After LSU lost their first two games to top five teams (Alabama and Notre Dame), Stovall announced that Dardar would play at both nose guard and defensive tackle, but would spend most of his time at the former. That season he recorded 77 tackles (14 tackles for loss), recovered four fumbles, and blocked two field goal attempts. At the end of the season, he was included on the All-Louisiana Collegiate First Team by the Louisiana Sports Writers Association.

By his senior season in 1982, Dardar had increased his weight to 255 pounds (up from 212 pounds his freshman year) and had taken 0.2 seconds off of his 40-yard dash time. Jenkins said that Dardar had also become more physical and played with better technique. LSU beat Alabama that year for the first time in 12 seasons, holding the Crimson Tide to 132 yards of total offense, and the Associated Press named Dardar and the other members of the LSU front seven, collectively, as its regional defensive lineman of the week. The team finished the regular season with an 8-2-1 record and went to the Orange Bowl against Nebraska, where Dardar was lined up opposite Dave Rimington, the Cornhuskers' center who had won his second Outland Trophy, an award given to the nation's best interior offensive lineman. The Cornhuskers gained 218 rushing yards in a 21–20 victory, but the head coaches of both teams praised Dardar's play and noted that Rimington did not dominate the matchup. Dardar was named a First Team All-SEC nose guard by both the Associated Press and United Press International that year, and the Touchdown Club of Atlanta recognized him as its SEC defensive lineman of the year. By the end of his senior season, Dardar was ranked in the top five in career sacks (15) in school history.

In January 1983, Dardar was selected by the United States Football League's New Jersey Generals in the third round of the USFL draft. Dardar said that he was hesitant to report to a USFL training camp since they started so soon after the end of the college football season. After the Generals signed the highly regarded running back Herschel Walker as a free agent, the team gave up on negotiating with Dardar and all of their top four draft picks. Three months later, Dardar was selected by the St. Louis Cardinals in the third round (71st overall) of the 1983 NFL Draft, and he agreed to a series of one-year contracts with the team in late June.

While he was at LSU, Dardar met a fellow student named Lorraine, and they later married and had three children.

== NFL career ==
Soon after arriving at training camp for the Cardinals, Dardar sustained a knee injury that caused him to miss most of camp. He was placed on injured reserve just prior to the 1983 season. In December 1983, Cardinals coach Jim Hanifan discussed moving Dardar to the offensive line to play guard. Asked whether the team would select an offensive lineman in the upcoming NFL draft, Hanifan replied that he "just drafted one today. From the defense. Ramsey Dardar. That was the first thing I did this morning. We had our draft right there." Hanifan said he thought Dardar had a better chance of becoming a star player on the offensive line.

During training camp before the 1984 season, Dardar was working out as an offensive guard. By the last preseason game, however, he was playing defensive end, and he forced a fumble on quarterback Archie Manning. He played in sixteen games for St. Louis that year. He sprained an ankle during the next year's preseason, and he was waived by St. Louis in early September 1985. Dardar had preseason trials as both an offensive and defensive lineman before his release.

While with the Cardinals, Dardar had become addicted to crack cocaine. He used marijuana recreationally at LSU and even tried cocaine there, but he said that he was not addicted to cocaine until he got into the NFL. He first went to drug rehabilitation during his time with the Cardinals, but drugs were so readily available in the league that he found it difficult to resist them. He said that people wanted to use drugs with him because of his fame, so he never had to pay for them.

Dardar was signed by the New York Giants after the 1985 season and cut before the 1986 season began. Upon Dardar's release, Giants coach Bill Parcells said that the team just had a lot of other talent on the defensive line but that Dardar had a chance to be picked up by another team. Greg LaFleur, Dardar's teammate at LSU and in St. Louis, said that the Giants had signed Dardar because the Giants defensive line coach was close friends with LSU assistant coach Pete Jenkins. LaFleur said that the Giants sent Dardar back to drug rehabilitation and that Dardar "came out and then he messed up again".

In May 1987, Dardar was signed by the Houston Oilers. He was placed on injured reserve before the start of the season and was waived by Houston that October. That same year, his two-year-old son, Ramsey Dardar Jr, was killed in an auto-pedestrian accident. Dardar said that his NFL injuries and the death of his son both worsened his drug addiction. He said that drugs made him want to kill himself.

== Personal life ==
In October 1990, Dardar pleaded guilty to three counts of burglary after admitting to break-ins that occurred in Baton Rouge, Louisiana, between May 1989 and May 1990. "I was hooked on cocaine and I had a hard time dealing with myself when my career was over," Dardar said after his arrest. In court, a defense attorney said that Dardar had an IQ of 71 and that he had scored a 3 out of a possible 36 on the ACT, a college admissions test. He said that Dardar should not have been admitted to college, but there were no entrance requirements for athletes when Dardar enrolled at LSU. Dardar faced up to 36 years in prison, but he was sentenced to five years on each count, with all but 18 months suspended. He was also required to perform community service, undergo treatment for substance abuse and pay $5500 in restitution to victims of his crimes.

Dardar was released from his first stay in prison after six months. He had been free for a week when he was arrested again in the spring of 1991. He had been caught in someone else's house. Dardar said that he had begun using drugs again a couple of months before his release from prison. He said he went into the home to steal some items but became paranoid and was about to leave without taking anything. Police did not find any items missing from the house, but there was jewelry in Dardar's truck that was thought to have been stolen from another home the night before. In May 1992, Dardar was sentenced to six years in prison after a guilty plea to charges of simple burglary and possession of stolen goods.

After being released from prison in March 1997, Dardar was arrested again that November for burglary and injuring a police dog. In that incident, a woman flagged down a canine officer with the Baton Rouge Police Department after seeing Dardar break into a shed. Dardar hid under a house and then struck a police dog with an ax handle and a screwdriver before surrendering. He was initially charged with 43 counts of burglary and could have been sentenced to more than 100 years in prison, but he pleaded guilty to eight counts in June 1998 and received a 32-year prison sentence.

Dardar remained married during his time in prison. He said that Lorraine would bring his children to visit him, but for the first few years she did not go in to visit herself. Dardar was paroled in the fall of 2017. In August 2020, Dardar moved into a new home in Lake Charles, Louisiana, but the house was destroyed by Hurricane Laura the day after he moved into it.

Dardar is the uncle of Reggie Dardar, a former track and field athlete at LSU.
