= Jeff Locke (American football) =

American football player (born 1989)

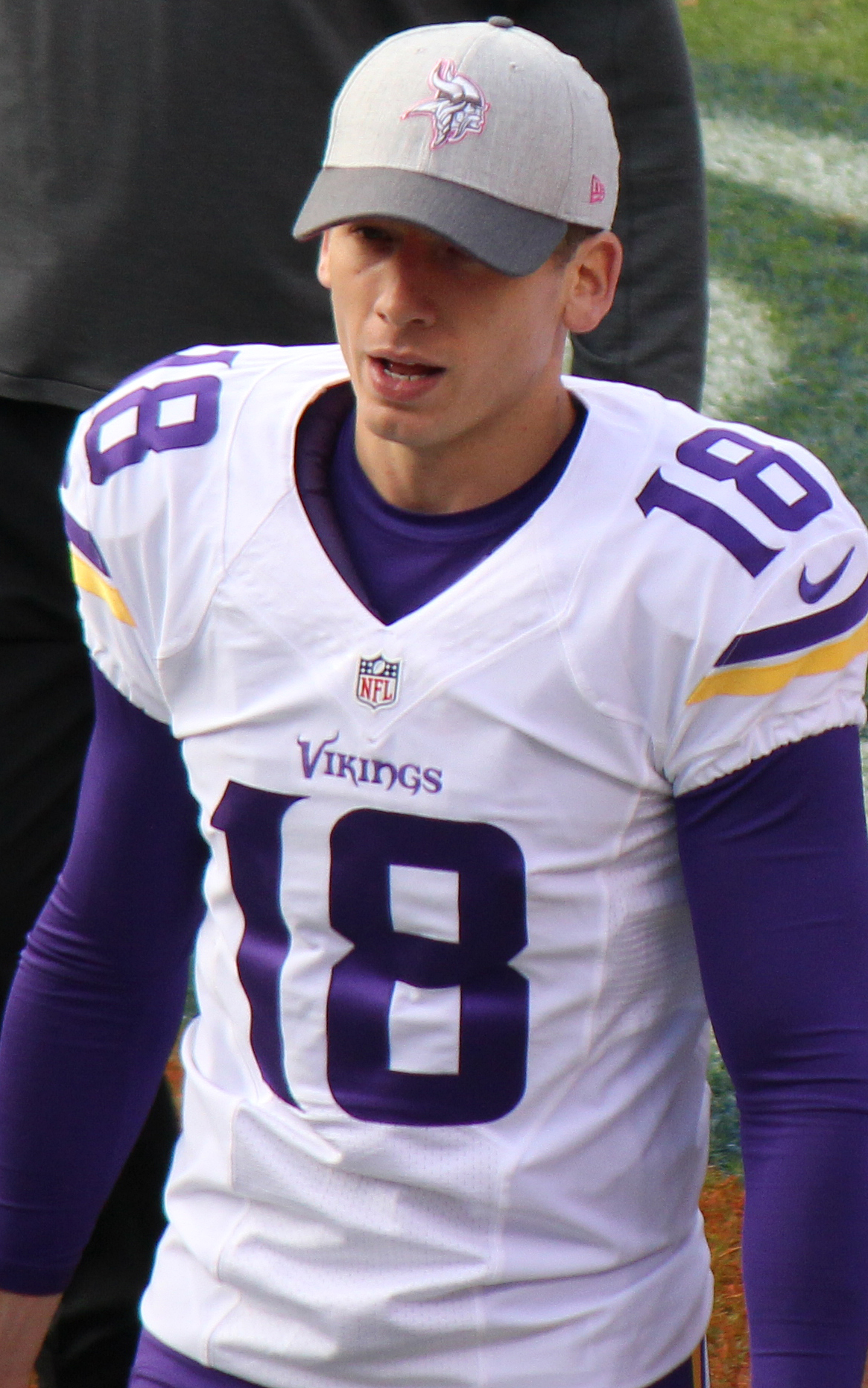
- Locke with the Minnesota Vikings in 2015

No. 12, 18, 2
- Position: Punter

Personal information
- Born: September 27, 1989 (age 37); Frankfurt, West Germany
- Listed height: 6 ft 0 in (1.83 m)
- Listed weight: 194 lb (88 kg)

Career information
- High school: Mountain Ridge (Glendale, Arizona, U.S.)
- College: UCLA
- NFL draft: 2013: 5th round, 155th overall pick

Career history
- Minnesota Vikings (2013–2016); Indianapolis Colts (2017)*; Detroit Lions (2017); San Francisco 49ers (2018)*; Arizona Hotshots (2019)
- * Offseason or practice squad member only

Awards and highlights
- First-team All-Pac-12 (2012); 2× Second-team All-Pac-10 (2009, 2010)

Career NFL statistics
- Punts: 317
- Punting yards: 13,757
- Punt average: 43.4
- Longest punt: 72
- Inside 20: 112
- Stats at Pro Football Reference

Jeffrey Ryan Locke (born September 27, 1989) is a former American football punter. He played college football at UCLA, and was selected by the Minnesota Vikings in the fifth round of the 2013 NFL draft.

== Early life ==
Locke attended Mountain Ridge High School in Glendale, Arizona, where he played football as a punter, kicker, and wide receiver. As a senior, Locke averaged 43.6 yards on 38 punts with 10 inside the 20-yard line, kicked 47 touchbacks on 54 kickoffs, converted 29 of 32 extra point attempts, and made 11 of 20 field goals. He set school records for most field goals in a season (11), longest punt (71 yards), and longest field goal (63 yards, a state record). For his efforts, Locke was ranked No. 1 kicker by ESPN.com and No. 1 nationally at punter by scout.com.

== College career ==
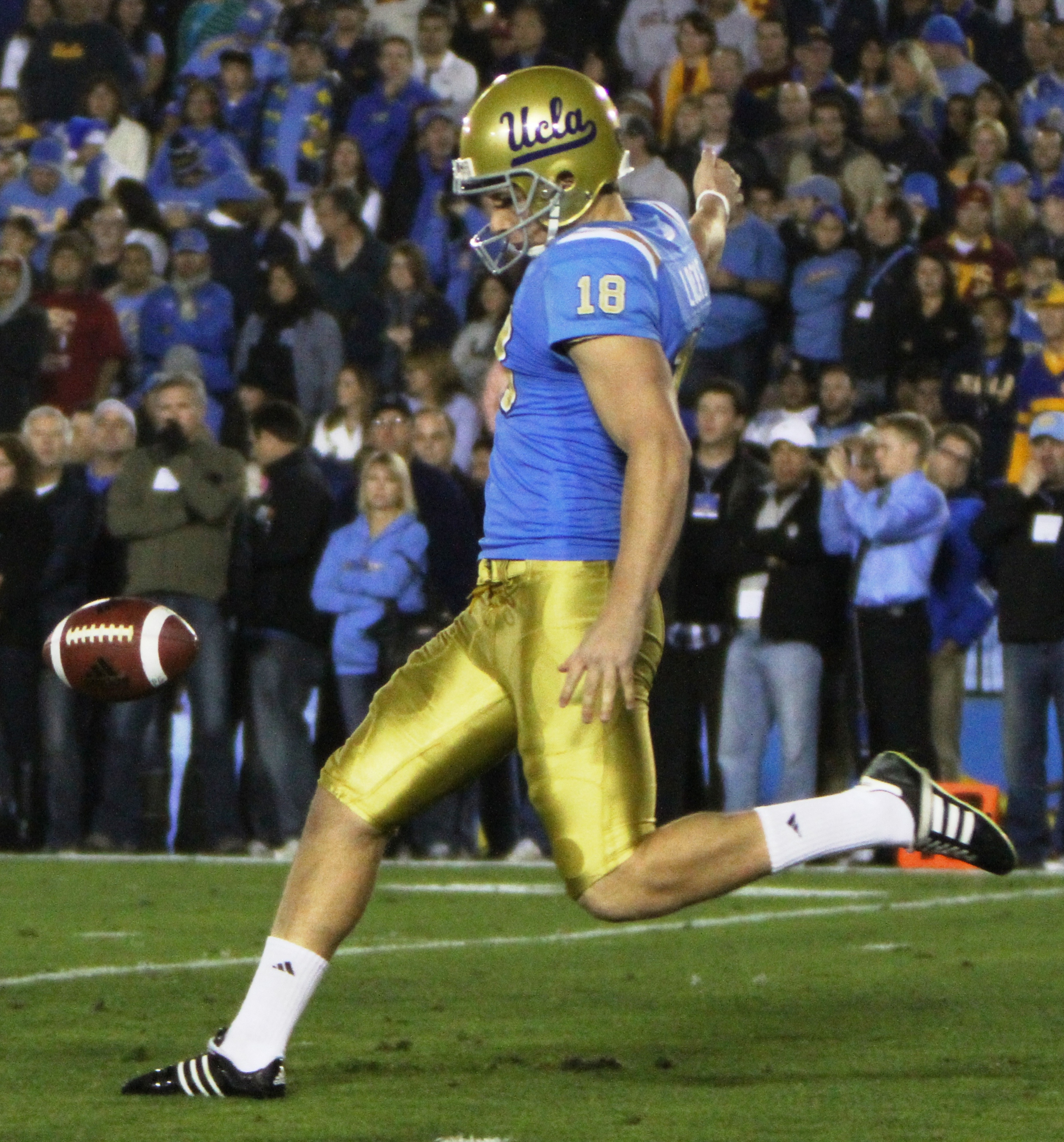
Locke punting at the Rose Bowl in 2010.

Locke attended the University of California, Los Angeles and played for the UCLA Bruins football team from 2008 to 2012. He did not see action in his first year but later became UCLA's starting punter and kickoff specialist for four seasons. He made 53 career starts with a punting average of 44.23, No. 2 in UCLA history. Locke also had a 42.54% touchback rate on kickoffs. In 2011, Locke took over for field goal and extra point duties in a few games following an injury to UCLA's starting placekicker. He went 2–3 on field goals, connecting from 49 and 51 as well as converting 6 of 9 extra point attempts. In his senior year, Locke was named first-team All-Pac-12, earned first-team all-conference academic team honors, selected to play in the Senior Bowl college all-star game, and earned the Captain's Award.

== Professional career ==
=== Minnesota Vikings ===
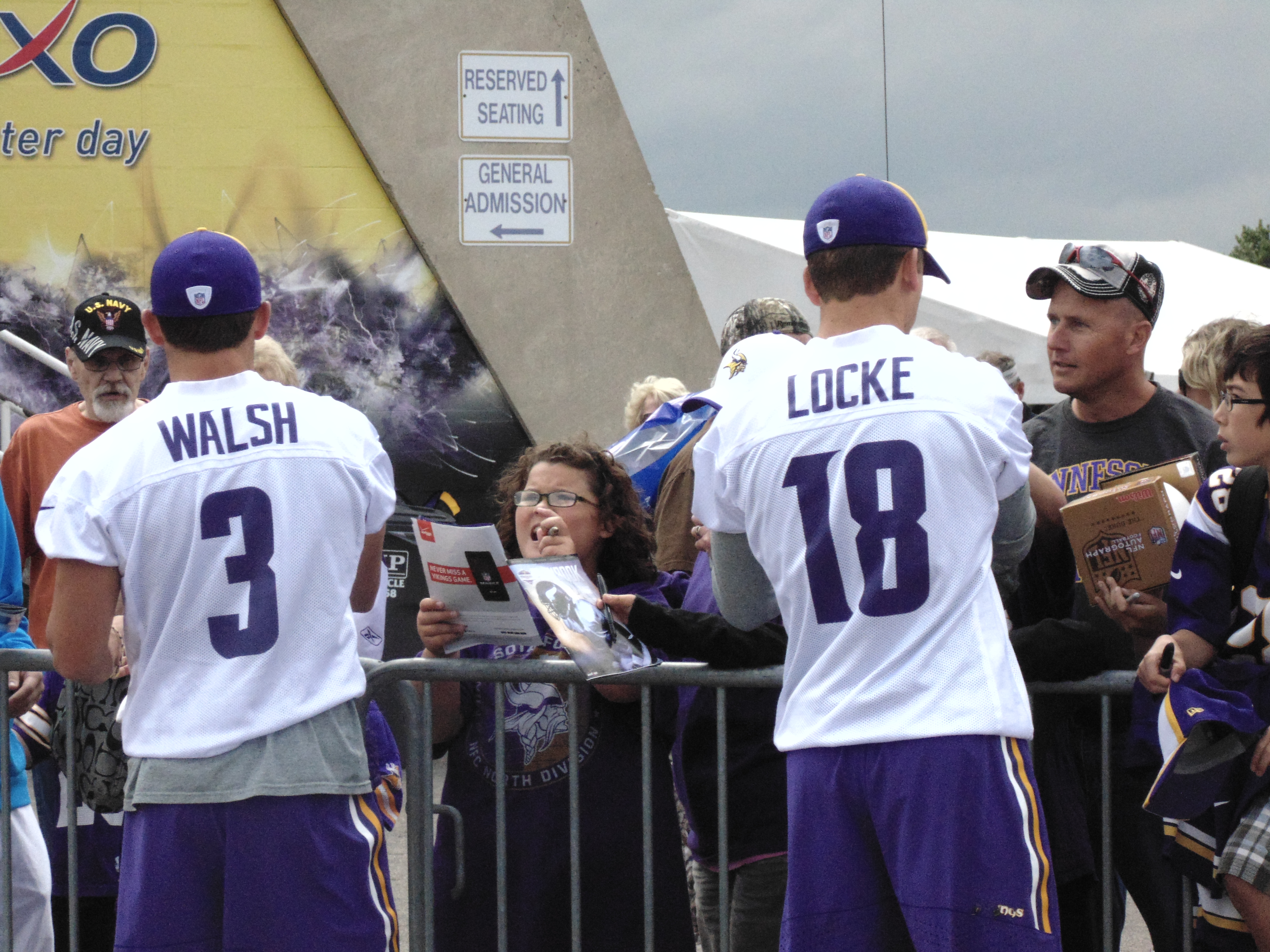
Locke signing autographs at the Vikings' training camp in 2014 with placekicker Blair Walsh.

Following a successful collegiate career, Locke was drafted 155th overall in the fifth round of the 2013 NFL Draft by the Minnesota Vikings. This made Locke the highest-picked punter in franchise history. NFL senior analyst Gil Brandt said that Locke, a left-footed punter, "is every bit as good as Bryan Anger," the punter selected in the third round by the Jacksonville Jaguars in the 2012 NFL draft. Locke was also noted for his kickoff abilities, having led the NCAA in touchbacks his senior year.

After competing with the Vikings' then current punter, veteran Chris Kluwe (8 seasons), Locke earned the starting job as Kluwe was released on May 6, 2013. It was speculated at the time that this move was made in order to make more room for the salary cap, as Kluwe was due 1.45 million in 2013. For the start of his rookie season, Locke wore number 12 until Week 5 when the Vikings signed quarterback Josh Freeman. Locke agreed to give his number 12 to Freeman and switched to number 18 and wore it for the next three seasons.

=== Indianapolis Colts ===
On March 10, 2017, Locke signed with the Indianapolis Colts. On August 28, 2017, Locke was released by the Colts after losing the starting job to rookie Rigoberto Sanchez.

=== Detroit Lions ===
On September 12, 2017, Locke signed with the Detroit Lions after an injury to Kasey Redfern, who was signed to replace Sam Martin. On October 24, 2017, Locke was released by the Lions after Martin returned to practice .

=== San Francisco 49ers ===
On March 12, 2018, Locke signed with the San Francisco 49ers. He was released on August 31, 2018.

=== Arizona Hotshots ===
On January 20, 2019, Locke signed with the Arizona Hotshots of the Alliance of American Football. The league ceased operations in April 2019.

== NFL career statistics ==
Legend
**Bold**	Career high

=== Regular season ===
Year	Team	Punting									
Year	Team	GP	Punts	Yds	Net Yds	Lng	Avg	Net Avg	Blk	Ins20	TB
2013	MIN	**16**	**75**	3,316	2,938	65	44.2	39.2	0	23	3
2014	MIN	**16**	**75**	**3,318**	**2,943**	62	44.2	38.7	**1**	21	**6**
2015	MIN	**16**	66	2,746	2,494	61	41.6	37.8	0	23	5
2016	MIN	**16**	74	3,155	2,886	**72**	42.6	39.0	0	**34**	3
2017	DET	5	27	1,222	1,140	54	**45.3**	**42.2**	0	11	0
Career		69	317	13,757	12,401	72	43.4	39.0	1	112	17

=== Playoffs ===
Year	Team	Punting									
Year	Team	GP	Punts	Yds	Net Yds	Lng	Avg	Net Avg	Blk	Ins20	TB
2015	MIN	**1**	**5**	**172**	**162**	**47**	**34.4**	**32.4**	0	**1**	0
Career		1	5	172	162	47	34.4	32.4	0	1	0

== Personal life ==
Locke "got hooked on punting" after attending a camp run by former NFL punter Ray Guy when he was in high school. He listed former NFL punter Daniel Sepulveda as one of the players he most admired.

Locke graduated from UCLA with a grade-point average of 3.885 and a bachelor's degree in economics. While at school, he spent some of his time researching athletic scholarships and helped his teammates set up personal budgets.
