= Mountain Ridge High School (Arizona) =

Public secondary school Glendale, Arizona, United States

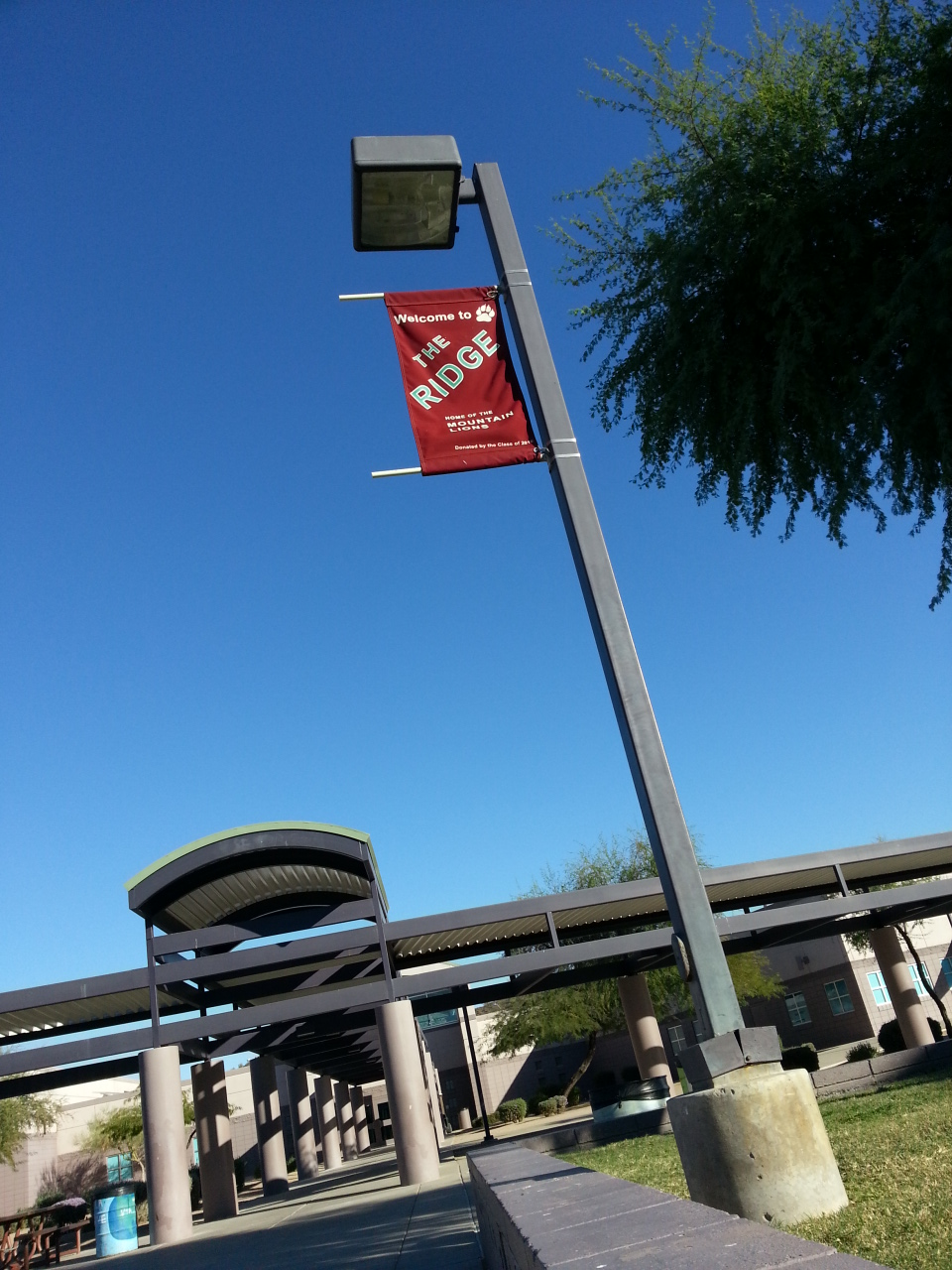
- Banner at MRHS

Location
- 22800 North 67th Avenue; Glendale, Arizona 85310; 33°41′28″N 112°12′19″W

Information
- Type: Public
- Motto: Athletic Motto- “The Ridge Way”
- Established: 1995; 31 years ago
- School district: Deer Valley Unified School District
- Principal: David Vines
- Teaching staff: 119.60 (FTE)
- Enrollment: 2,787 (2023–2024)
- Student to teacher ratio: 23.30
- Campus: Suburban
- Colors: Burgundy and forest green
- Mascot: Mountain Lions
- Rival: Sandra Day O'Connor High School
- Newspaper: The Ridge Review
- Website: mrhs.dvusd.org

Mountain Ridge High School is a public high school in Glendale, Arizona, United States, a suburb of Phoenix. The school opened in fall 1995. The school had a 95% graduation rate in 2015. Mountain Ridge is part of the Deer Valley Unified School District.

== School structure ==
=== Enrollment ===
In the 2014–15 school year, Mountain Ridge High School had an enrollment of 2,206 students. The student population was 75% White, with 12% Hispanic and Latino Americans.

== Athletics ==
Fall Sports

- Badminton
- Cross Country
- Football
- Golf
- Girls Volleyball
- Swim & Dive
- Girls Flag Football

Winter Sports

- Basketball
- Soccer
- Wrestling

Spring Sports

- Baseball
- Beach Volleyball
- Boys Volleyball
- Softball
- Tennis
- Track & Field
- E-Sports

== Awards and recognition ==
- NFHS Level 1, 2, & 3 Coaching Distinction 2023 & 2024 as a school. First school in Arizona to earn this honor.
- NIAAA Quality Program Award 2024.
- AIA Sportsmanship School Award, 2024 & 2025.
- AIA Directors Cup 2022 for outstanding overall Athletic Department.
- The Pride of the West marching band won the 2019, 2022,2023 and 2024,2025 Arizona Band and Orchestra Directors Association (ABODA) State Marching Band Championships.
- The Pride of the West won the 2019 and 2022 Arizona Marching Band Association (AzMBA) Class 4A State Championships, and won the Class 5A State Championships in 2023 and 2024.
- Lacrosse won the 2017 Division II Boys State Title.
- Mock Trial won the 2013 Arizona State Championship

== Notable alumni ==
- Eric Bennett (1991), (former teacher), archer and five-time Paralympian
- Chris Duffy (1998), MLB player
- Eddie Bonine (1999), MLB player
- Richie Incognito (2001), NFL player
- Nate Adams (2002), motocross rider and extreme sports athlete
- Travis Peterson (2003), basketball player
- Jon Weeks (2004), NFL player
- Cory Burns (2005), MLB player
- Brady Ellison (2006), archer, Olympic medalist
- Allysa Seely (2007), paratriathlete, gold medalist at the 2016 and 2020 Summer Paralympics
- Crissa Jackson (2008), basketball player
- Jeff Locke (2008), NFL player
- Parker Markel (2009), MLB player
- Turner Bernard (2016), professional football player
- Giselle Juarez (2016), softball player
- Jade Carey (2018), gymnast, Olympic gold medalist
- Matthew Liberatore (2018), MLB player
- Josh Green (2019 - transferred), NBA player
