= Joel Stelly =

American football player (born 1984)

Profile
- Position: Punter

Personal information
- Born: January 13, 1984 (age 42); Lafayette, Louisiana, U.S.

Career information
- College: Louisiana-Monroe

Career history
- Chicago Bears (2006–2007)*; → Cologne Centurions (2007)
- * Offseason or practice squad member only

Joel Stelly (born January 13, 1984) is an American former football punter. He attended Cecilia High School and the University of Louisiana at Monroe, where he spent his collegiate football career as place kicker and punter. Stelly is a Louisiana native, spending his youth in Lafayette, Louisiana. He was a member of the Chicago Bears of the National Football League.

== Professional career ==
The Chicago Bears acquired Stelly around the 2006 season. He spent some time at the Bears' spring training camp, and was then relocated to NFL Europa for development. He was cut before the start of the 2007 season in favor of veteran punter Brad Maynard.
