= Jon Weeks =

American football player (born 1986)

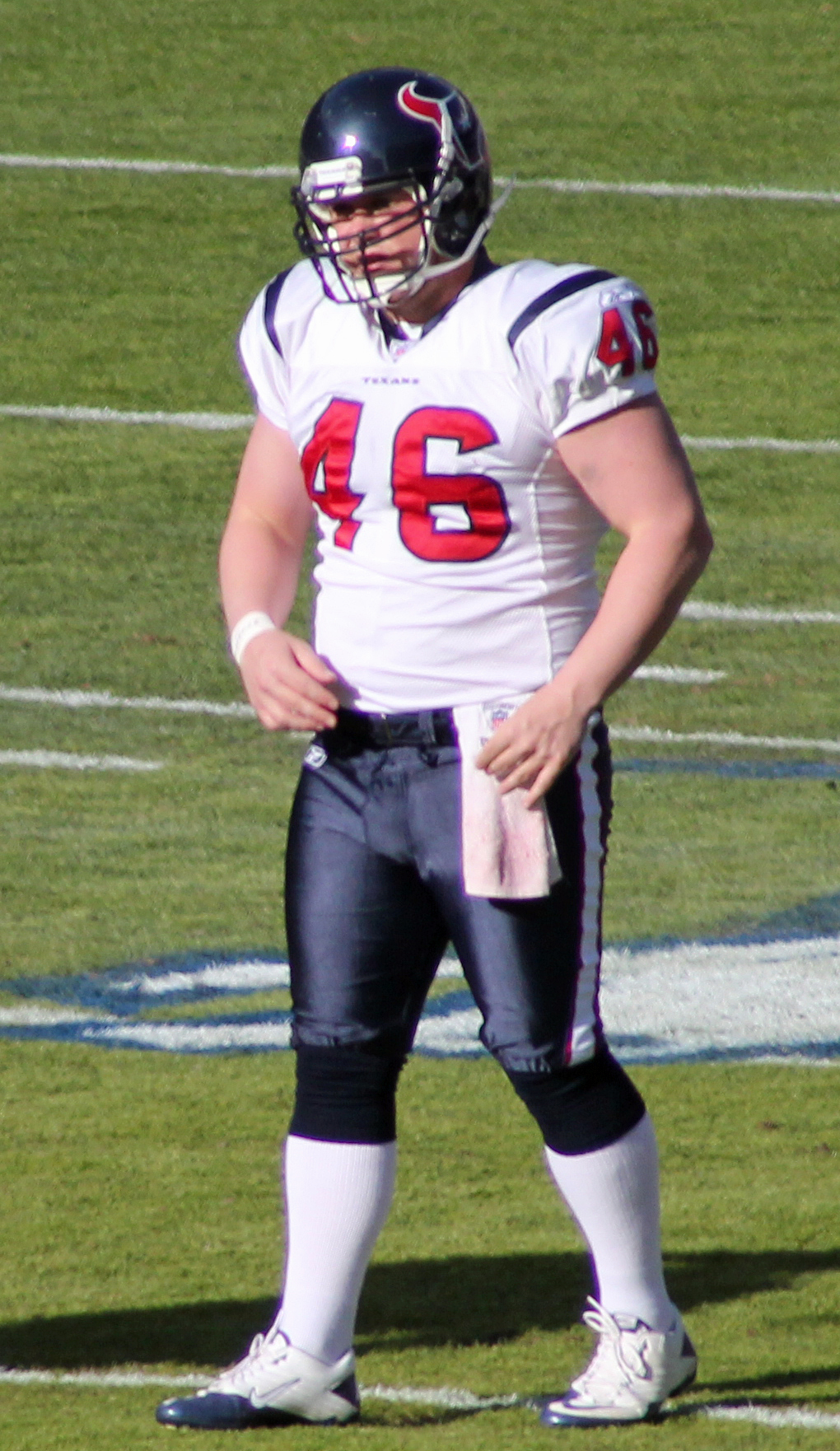
- Weeks with the Houston Texans in 2010

No. 46 – San Francisco 49ers
- Position: Long snapper
- Roster status: Active

Personal information
- Born: February 17, 1986 (age 40); Bethpage, New York, U.S.
- Listed height: 5 ft 11 in (1.80 m)
- Listed weight: 242 lb (110 kg)

Career information
- High school: Mountain Ridge (Glendale, Arizona)
- College: Baylor (2004–2007)
- NFL draft: 2008: undrafted

Career history
- Houston Texans (2010–2024); San Francisco 49ers (2025–present)

Awards and highlights
- 2× Pro Bowl (2015, 2025)

Career NFL statistics as of Week 10, 2026
- Games played: 270
- Tackles: 35
- Fumble recoveries: 1
- Stats at Pro Football Reference

Jonathan Donald Weeks (born February 17, 1986) is an American professional football long snapper for the San Francisco 49ers of the National Football League (NFL). He was signed by the Houston Texans as an undrafted free agent in 2010. He played college football for the Baylor Bears.

== Early life and college ==
Weeks attended Mountain Ridge High School in Glendale, Arizona, where he was a four-year letterer for the Mountain Lions football team. Weeks started three consecutive years at offensive line and two at defensive line, where he excelled at both positions while only standing at 5'11. As a senior, Weeks was named to Arizona's all-state offensive line and was also voted as the best defensive lineman in the entire state, additionally winning Arizona's two-way MVP. He also lettered four years in powerlifting. Despite the performance, Weeks' size resulted in no D1 offers, and he chose to walk on at Baylor University.

After successfully walking onto Baylor's football team, he briefly practiced at defensive end and middle linebacker before finding a spot as the team's long snapper, where he saw starting playing time as a true freshman. He was placed on full scholarship entering his sophomore season and he would start every long snap for the remainder of his college career, with the exception of four games he missed as a junior due to illness. As a senior, Weeks was voted as Baylor's special teams captain and was considered one of the best long snappers in college football. He additionally tacked on six tackles and a forced fumble throughout his career.

== Professional career ==
Pre-draft measurables
Height	Weight
5 ft 11 1/8 in (1.81 m)	245 lb (111 kg)
Values from Pro Day

=== Houston Texans ===
Weeks went undrafted in the 2008 NFL draft and had a tryout with the Detroit Lions in minicamp, but did not sign with them. He was out of football for the 2008 and 2009 seasons. During those two seasons Weeks did not think he would get another shot at playing in the NFL. Weeks was pursuing a career in firefighting. On April 28, 2010, Weeks signed with the Houston Texans and made the team following training camp. After signing with the Texans, Weeks put his Firefighter duties on hold.

Weeks re-signed with the Texans on March 5, 2012. He signed a four-year, $3.9 million contract extension with the Texans on September 7, 2015.

On January 19, 2016, it was announced that Weeks had been selected to his first Pro Bowl.

On September 9, 2018, in the season opener against the New England Patriots, Weeks set the Texans franchise record for most consecutive games played with 129.

On March 26, 2020, Weeks re-signed with the Texans. He was released during final roster cuts on September 5, 2020, but re-signed with the team two days later.

Weeks re-signed with the Texans again on March 29, 2021, and again on February 22, 2022. In Week 7 against the Tennessee Titans, Weeks played in his 200th career NFL game.

On February 27, 2023, Weeks re-signed with the Texans to a one-year deal.

On February 1, 2024, Weeks re-signed with the Texans to a one-year deal for the 2024 season, his 15th year with the team.

=== San Francisco 49ers ===
On March 13, 2025, Weeks signed with the San Francisco 49ers on a one-year, $1.422 million contract. On December 23, Weeks was named to his second Pro Bowl.

On March 3, 2026, Weeks re-signed with the 49ers on a one-year contract. He was released by San Francisco on August 30, and subsequently re–signed with their practice squad the next day. Weeks was promoted to the active roster on September 5.

== NFL career statistics ==
Legend
**Bold**	Career high

=== Regular season ===
Year	Team	Games		Tackles					Interceptions						Fumbles				
Year	Team	GP	GS	Cmb	Solo	Ast	Sck	TFL	Int	Yds	Avg	Lng	TD	PD	FF	Fum	FR	Yds	TD
2010	HOU	16	0	3	1	2	0.0	0	0	0	0.0	0	0	0	0	0	0	0	0
2011	HOU	16	0	0	0	0	0.0	0	0	0	0.0	0	0	0	0	0	0	0	0
2012	HOU	16	0	0	0	0	0.0	0	0	0	0.0	0	0	0	0	0	0	0	0
2013	HOU	16	0	7	2	**5**	0.0	0	0	0	0.0	0	0	0	0	0	0	0	0
2014	HOU	16	0	2	2	0	0.0	0	0	0	0.0	0	0	0	0	0	0	0	0
2015	HOU	16	0	**8**	**6**	2	0.0	0	0	0	0.0	0	0	0	0	0	**1**	0	0
2016	HOU	16	0	0	0	0	0.0	0	0	0	0.0	0	0	0	0	0	0	0	0
2017	HOU	16	0	0	0	0	0.0	0	0	0	0.0	0	0	0	0	0	0	0	0
2018	HOU	16	0	1	0	1	0.0	0	0	0	0.0	0	0	0	0	0	0	0	0
2019	HOU	16	0	2	0	2	0.0	0	0	0	0.0	0	0	0	0	0	0	0	0
2020	HOU	16	0	1	1	0	0.0	0	0	0	0.0	0	0	0	0	0	0	0	0
2021	HOU	**17**	0	2	1	1	0.0	0	0	0	0.0	0	0	0	0	0	0	0	0
2022	HOU	**17**	0	6	1	**5**	0.0	0	0	0	0.0	0	0	0	0	0	0	0	0
2023	HOU	**17**	0	1	0	1	0.0	0	0	0	0.0	0	0	0	0	0	0	0	0
2024	HOU	**17**	0	0	0	0	0.0	0	0	0	0.0	0	0	0	0	0	0	0	0
2025	SF	**17**	0	2	1	1	0.0	0	0	0	0.0	0	0	0	0	0	0	0	0
2026	SF	8	0	0	0	0	0.0	0	0	0	0.0	0	0	0	0	0	0	0	0
Career		269	0	35	15	20	0.0	0	0	0	0.0	0	0	0	0	0	1	0	0

=== Postseason ===
Year	Team	Games		Tackles					Interceptions						Fumbles				
Year	Team	GP	GS	Cmb	Solo	Ast	Sck	TFL	Int	Yds	Avg	Lng	TD	PD	FF	Fum	FR	Yds	TD
2011	HOU	**2**	0	0	0	0	0.0	0	0	0	0.0	0	0	0	0	0	0	0	0
2012	HOU	**2**	0	0	0	0	0.0	0	0	0	0.0	0	0	0	0	0	0	0	0
2015	HOU	1	0	0	0	0	0.0	0	0	0	0.0	0	0	0	0	0	0	0	0
2016	HOU	**2**	0	0	0	0	0.0	0	0	0	0.0	0	0	0	0	0	0	0	0
2018	HOU	1	0	0	0	0	0.0	0	0	0	0.0	0	0	0	0	0	0	0	0
2019	HOU	**2**	0	0	0	0	0.0	0	0	0	0.0	0	0	0	0	0	0	0	0
2023	HOU	**2**	0	0	0	0	0.0	0	0	0	0.0	0	0	0	0	0	0	0	0
2024	HOU	**2**	0	0	0	0	0.0	0	0	0	0.0	0	0	0	0	0	0	0	0
2025	SF	**2**	0	0	0	0	0.0	0	0	0	0.0	0	0	0	0	0	0	0	0
Career		16	0	0	0	0	0.0	0	0	0	0.0	0	0	0	0	0	0	0	0
