= Florida A&M Lady Rattlers basketball =

Florida A&M Rattlers
2024–25 Florida A&M Lady Rattlers basketball team
- University: Florida A&M University
- Head coach: Bridgette Gordon (2nd season)
- Location: Tallahassee, Florida
- Arena: Alfred Lawson, Jr. Multipurpose Center (capacity: 9,639)
- Conference: SWAC
- Nickname: Lady Rattlers
- Colors: Green and orange

NCAA Division I tournament appearances
- 1995, 1999

Conference tournament champions
- NSWAC/ASUN: 1986; MEAC: 1995, 1999

Conference regular-season champions
- 1993, 1995, 1996

Uniforms
Home	Away

The Florida A&M Lady Rattlers basketball team is an NCAA Division I that competes in the Southwestern Athletic Conference and represents Florida A&M University in Tallahassee, Florida. The team last played in the NCAA Division I women's basketball tournament in 1999. Their home arena is the Teaching Gym/Alfred Lawson Jr. Multipurpose Center, which seats a maximum of 9,639.

== NCAA appearances ==
Florida A&M has appeared in the NCAA Division I women's basketball tournament twice. The Rattlers have a record of 0–2.

Year	Seed	Round	Opponent	Result/Score
1995	#16	First Round	#1 Tennessee	L 59–96
1999	#15	First Round	#2 Clemson	L 45–76
