= SciTech High =

Coordinates: 40.2603°N 76.8809°W

SciTech Campus

Location
- 215 Market Street; Harrisburg, Pennsylvania 17101; United States

Information
- Type: Public
- Established: September 2003
- School district: Harrisburg City School District
- Principal: Dr. Stacey Nornhold
- Grades: 9th - 12th
- Enrollment: 366 pupils (2012-13),
- Communities served: Harrisburg City
- Affiliation: Harrisburg University
- Website: http://www.hbgsd.k12.pa.us

SciTech Campus of Harrisburg High school, located in downtown Harrisburg, Pennsylvania, is a regional math and science public school that attracts students from Harrisburg and neighboring school districts. Beginning with the 9th grade, SciTech Campus prepares students for a university curriculum, studying toward degrees in science, engineering and technology. Enrollment is limited to 400 pupils The opportunity to create a unified 9-16 curriculum is unique in the nation and represents a potentially replicable approach to bridging the frequent discontinuity between high school and higher education. The school is a federally designated Title I school. It opened in September 2003.

In 2011, the Harrisburg City School District Board changed the name of the school to Harrisburg High School, SciTech Campus. Prior the name was Scitech High.

In 2013, Harrisburg High School, SciTech Campus' enrollment was reported as 366 pupils in 9th through 12th grades.

== Program ==
SciTech Campus focuses on the College in High School program, that lets students enroll in college classes while they are still in high school. Students take advanced and engaging science related courses and earn college credit while completing high school graduation requirements. In the past, SciTech has allowed students to take classes at the nearby Harrisburg Area Community College campus as well as Harrisburg University.

Students participate in a monthly Community Partnership Day. This day is used as an external teaching tool with each activity or group monitored by a staff member. Activities include speakers, volunteer events, and career development and exploration opportunities. This type of activity is unique to this high school in the area.

== Extracurricular activities ==
The school has one of the few active robotics teams in Harrisburg. It is led by one of the school's first teachers, Robert Steps. The program helps teach teamwork, ingenuity, and how to speak robot C, a code language designed for robots. The team joins in a tournament every year.

Other current and former extracurricular activities include Math & Music Club, Student Council, Youth & Government, Brainbusters/Quiz Bowl, Choir, Key Club, International Club, and National Honor Society. Student athletes are eligible to compete for the Harrisburg High Cougars with students from the John Harris campus.

== See also ==
- Harrisburg School District
