= Cecilia High School =

Location
- 2397 Cecilia Sr. High School Highway; Cecilia, St. Martin (Parish), Louisiana 70521; United States; 30°20′18″N 91°50′39″W

Information
- School type: Public high school
- Established: ~1922
- School district: St. Martin Parish School District
- School number: 337-667-6221
- Principal: Nicole Usie
- Teaching staff: 44.77 (FTE)
- Grades: 9–12
- Enrollment: 796 (2023-2024)
- Student to teacher ratio: 17.78
- Colors: Green and gold
- Athletics conference: Louisiana High School Athletic Association
- Mascot: Barky the Bulldog
- Nickname: Bulldogs
- Rivals: Breaux Bridge High School
- Accreditation: Southern Association of Colleges and Schools.
- Yearbook: Big Bark
- Website: chs.saintmartinschools.org

Cecilia High School (CHS) is a 4A public secondary school located in Cecilia, an unincorporated community in Saint Martin Parish, Louisiana, United States.

Cecilia High School is accredited by the Department of Education of the State of Louisiana and the Southern Association of Colleges and Schools.

Founded in 1922, Cecilia High School is one of three public high schools administered by the Saint Martin Parish School District.

Cecilia High School primarily serves students of northern upper Saint Martin Parish including the communities of Arnaudville, Cecilia, and Henderson.

== School's beginnings ==
The unincorporated community of Cecilia was originally known by early Spanish settlers as "La Punta", describing the deep bend in the Bayou Teche; eventually this was translated over time by the French into "La Grande Pointe." Pierre Guidry, a native of Acadia, Nova Scotia and the first settler of Cecilia, acquired three tracts of land from Mrs. Joseph Alexander Declouet in 1791. Following suit, other families settled on lands that was acquired by Declouet through a Spanish land grant dated May 16, 1772, which included some 2,600 acres (11 km^{2}) of land. The community began as a small service center of sorts for the many landowners in outlying areas surrounding the Bayou Teche. As families settled within the area, educational needs of the children was evident yet insufficient. Before the establishment of a public high school in Cecilia, several private schools operated within the community with only a fortunate few enrolled; primarily children of local affluence. As trade and commerce grew within the small steamboat stop along the Bayou Teche, the need for a public school was clearly evident. Headmistress of the first public, free tuition school in the community was under the supervision of Mrs. A. P. Lastrapes (the former Marie De La Croix) in the St. Joseph Chapel around 1893. Lastrapes also served as postmistress for the town - originally named LaPlace - but due to confusion with another town of the same name in St. John the Baptist Parish, Louisiana, the community was renamed. Due to the predominantly Roman Catholic population of the area in addition to Lastrapes' love of music, the naming of the community was in honor of Saint Cecilia, the patron saint of music. Continued growth in student enrollment spurred the construction of a two-story, four room wooden structure on land purchased by Mr. Joel Dupuis on the eastern bank of the Bayou Teche in preparation for the 1905-1906 session.

== Architecture ==
Completed in 1922 on the original plot of land donated by Dupuis, the original Cecilia High School building was designed by the architectural firm of Nolan and Torre of New Orleans, Louisiana. The first graduating class of Cecilia High School in 1923 was composed of only five students, all male.

On October 25, 1980, the original three story structure was destroyed by fire, sparing the adjacent gymnasium and auditorium. Though the official cause of the fire was linked to an antiquated boiler system used to heat the school, members of the community continue to speculate about the possibility of arson in the demise of the school. A new Cecilia Junior High School, completed in 1999, was constructed at the former high school site, integrating a renovated gymnasium and auditorium into the design. Due to its distinctive architectural importance, all documentation regarding the original Cecilia High School are maintained by the Southeast Architectural Archives at Tulane University in New Orleans, Louisiana.

Due to increased enrollment on the main campus, several new facilities such as a Multi-Purpose complex, Girl's Gymnasium, Band Hall, softball stadium, and improvements to student parking were completed during the 2012–2013 school year. As of March 2019, a modern football and soccer field, track, and stadium with new fieldhouse and concessions stands are under construction on the main campus.

Cecilia High School Campus, 1922

== Academics ==
A college preparatory curriculum is offered as the school stresses a personal approach to the education of the whole student through diverse academic, athletic, and co-curricular programs. The mission of Cecilia High School is "Building a Legacy of Excellence One Student at a Time. In addition to the traditional curriculum offered, several "career centered" courses offer students hand-on and specialized training in specific areas, most notably the school's Cisco Systems Networking Academy, aimed towards student careers in telecommunications and internet networks, the National Restaurant Association ProStart Program which prepares students for careers in hospitality and the culinary arts, the Early Childhood Program that certifies students to work in childcare facilities, the First Responder course which certifies student as First Responders in emergency situations, and the Small Engine Repair program. Students also participate in career & technical courses offered through the Louisiana Technical College system. Dual-enrollment credit is also currently offered in several courses across the curriculum. Teachers are actually hired as adjunt instructors through either the Louisiana Technical College system, or through the Southwest Louisiana Community College system. Recently, a new program in Barbering and Hairstyling is being offered at a satellite campus within the Cecilia community, in a partnership between the St. Martin Parish School Board and St. Martin Parish Government.

== Scholarships ==
In addition to scholarships awarded by numerous colleges and universities, Cecilia High School has an established educational trust: The Mona Halphen Dupuis Memorial Scholarship Fund. Graduating seniors who have displayed exemplary academic and extracurricular achievement throughout their high school career are awarded several tiers of scholarships based on individual achievements and performance throughout high school. Eligible students must apply for the scholarships and students are chosen through a selective process by the board of directors upon recommendation from school faculty and administration.

== Extracurricular activities ==
Cecilia High School offers numerous co-curricular and extracurricular activities encouraging student participation. Numerous student organizations represent the best of Cecilia High School; among them the speech and debate teams, cheerleading, marching and concert bands, colorguard, winterguard, and dance teams, competing at regional, state, and national levels.

The Cecilia High Concert Band recently garnered an invitation to the 2015 Spring Band Competition to be held at Six Flags Fiesta Texas, San Antonio, Texas.

== Principals ==
W. J. Smith; 1922
A. J. Cormier; 1926–1927
C. J. Dugas; 1927–1937
W. R. Angelle; 1937–1949
Homer J. LeBlanc; 1949–1977
Malcolm Calais; 1977–1978
Allen Stelly; 1978–1987
Eric Castille; 1987–1994
Malcolm Calais; 1994–2004
Anthony Polotzola; 2004–2013
Daniel LeBoeuf; 2013–2018
Nicole Usie; 2018–Present

== Mascot ==
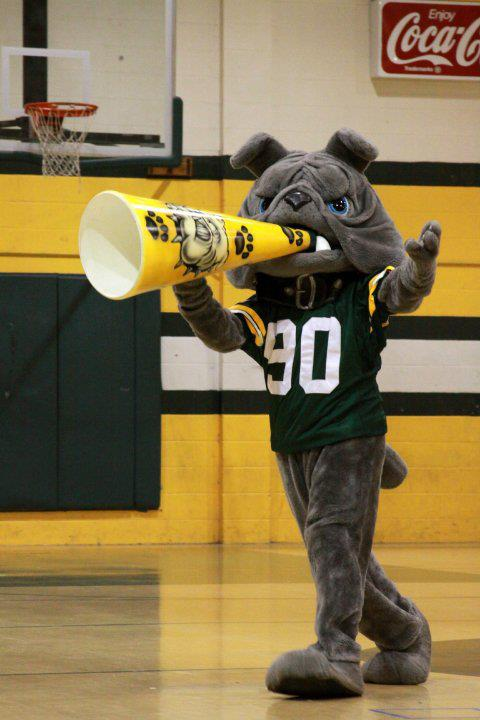
Barky The Bulldog: Cecilia High School's Athletic Mascot

The mascot of Cecilia High School is the Bulldog (by appearance), though known as the "Mighty Bulldogs" or "Barky the Bulldog".

== Athletics ==
Cecilia High School Athletics Logo.

Cecilia High athletics competes in the LHSAA.

Cecilia High School varsity and junior varsity baseball, basketball (men and women), volleyball, fast-pitch softball, indoor and outdoor track and field, and football teams are sponsored by the school.

=== Championships ===
Football championships

- (1) State Championship: 1995
- (2) State Championship: 2024

== Alma mater ==
We gather here in unity
Remembering days of old
and hardships fought with bravery
Which made us strong and bold

And days of joy and friendliness
Which fill our hearts with happiness
We hail our dear old alma mater
Hail, Cecilia High!

== Fight song ==
Fight for our colors, green and gold
Fight for our honour, heart and soul
Lift up her glory, lift up her name
Shake down the thunder with her fame

Win or lose, we'll never be blue
We stand together, loyal and true
We're from Cecilia, this is our fight song
Cecilia, right or wrong, Hey!

== Noted alumni ==
- Bob Angelle, Louisiana state representative
- Al Berard, Grammy Award nominated recording artist and composer (class of 1978).
- Raymond Calais, football player (class of 2016).
- Anthony Clement, National Football League, football player (class of 1994).
- Ramsey Dardar, football player.
- Paul Hardy, politician (class of 1960).
- Ali Landry, Miss USA 1996 (class of 1991).
- Joel Stelly, football player (class of 2002).
- Alphonso G. Williams, current head basketball coach at Cecilia High School, basketball player, (class of 2002).
