= Norfolk State Spartans women's basketball =

2026–27 Norfolk State Spartans women's basketball team
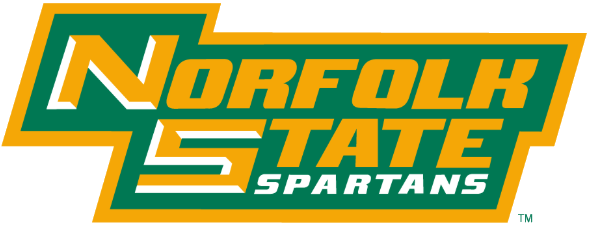
- University: Norfolk State University
- Head coach: Jermaine Woods (2nd season)
- Location: Norfolk, Virginia
- Arena: Echols Hall (capacity: 7,000)
- Conference: MEAC
- Nickname: Spartans
- Colors: Green and gold

NCAA Division I tournament Final Four
- 1991*
Other NCAA Division I tournament results
Elite Eight	1991*
Sweet Sixteen	1991*, 1993*, 1994*
Appearances	1982*, 1983*, 1986*, 1991*, 1992*, 1993*, 1994*, 1995*, 2002, 2023, 2024, 2025

Conference tournament champions
- CIAA: 1975, 1977, 1983, 1986, 1991, 1992, 1993, 1995, 1996; MEAC: 2002, 2023, 2024, 2025

Conference regular-season champions
- MEAC: 2022, 2023, 2024, 2025

Uniforms
Home	Away
- * at Division II level

The Norfolk State Spartans women's basketball team represents Norfolk State University, located in Norfolk, Virginia, in NCAA Division I basketball competition. They currently compete at the Joseph G. Echols Memorial Hall on Norfolk State's main campus. They are members of the Mid-Eastern Athletic Conference.

== History ==
Norfolk State began play in 1974. They competed in the Central Intercollegiate Athletic Association (CIAA) from 1974 to 1997 before joining Division I and the MEAC in 1997. In their time in Division II, they were champions of the CIAA Tournament in 1975, 1977, 1983, 1986, 1991, 1992, 1993, 1995, and 1996, while competing in eight NCAA Division II Tournaments (1982, 1983, 1986, 1991, 1992, 1993, 1994, 1995), reaching the Final Four in 1991.

== Postseason ==
=== NCAA Division I Tournament results ===
The Spartans have made four appearances in the NCAA Division I women's basketball tournament. They have a combined record of 0–4.

Year	Seed	Round	Opponent	Result
2002	# 16	First round	# 1 Duke	L 48–95
2023	# 16	First round	#1 South Carolina	L 40–72
2024	#15	First round	#2 Stanford	L 50–79
2025	#13	First round	#4 Maryland	L 69–82

=== NCAA Division II tournament results ===
The Spartans made eight appearances in the NCAA Division II women's basketball tournament. They had a combined record of 9–9.

Year	Round	Opponent	Result
1982	First round Regional finals	Pitt Johnstown; Mount St. Mary's	W 81–80 (OT); L 64–82
1983	First round	Virginia Union	L 66–78
1984	First round	Hampton	L 60–73
1991	First round Regional finals Elite Eight; Final Four; Third Place	Pace; UNC Greensboro; Clarion; Southeast Missouri State; Bentley	W 88–47; W 72–62; W 91–69; L 52–85; L 58–60
1992	First round Regional finals	Johnson C. Smith; North Dakota	W 108–71; L 48–63
1993	First round Regional finals Elite Eight	Fort Valley State; USC Spartanburg; Bentley	W 90–76; W 75–68; L 66–84
1994	First round Regional finals Elite Eight	USC Spartanburg; Wingate; Bellarmine	W 82–66; W 83–80 (OT); L 80–92
1995	Regional semifinals	Wingate	L 68–70
