= Cecilia, Louisiana =

- Census-designated place
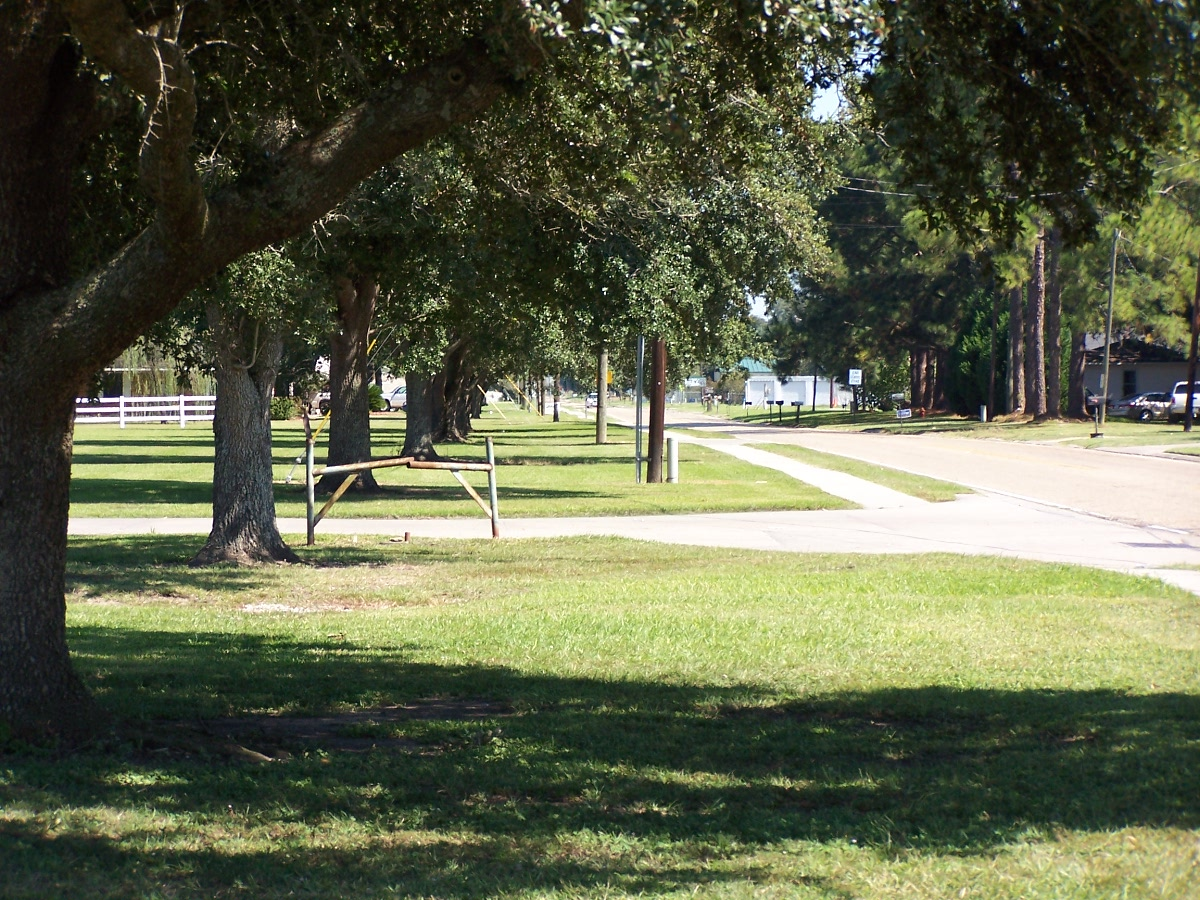
- Downtown Cecilia

- Location of Cecilia in Louisiana
- Coordinates: 30°20′14″N 91°51′11″W
- Country: United States
- State: Louisiana
- Parish: St. Martin

Area
  - Total: 2.14 sq mi (5.54 km^{2})
  - Land: 2.12 sq mi (5.49 km^{2})
  - Water: 0.023 sq mi (0.06 km^{2})
- Elevation: 26 ft (7.9 m)

Population (2020)
  - Total: 1,807
  - Density: 853.1/sq mi (329.37/km^{2})
- Time zone: UTC-6 (CST)
  - Summer (DST): UTC-5 (CDT)
- ZIP Code: 70521
- Area code: 337
- FIPS code: 22-13575

Cecilia is a census-designated place (CDP) in St. Martin Parish, in the U.S. state of Louisiana. The community lies within the region of Acadiana, and the Lafayette metropolitan statistical area. As of the 2020 census, Cecilia had a population of 1,807.

== History ==
Cecilia sits on land that was historically inhabited by the Atakapa Tribe. The Atakapa lived in what is now Southwest Louisiana and Texas, and had a trading post at St. Martinville, before French settlers took over the land.

Cecilia was originally known by the Spanish as La Punta. It was translated by the French into La Grande Pointe, a name that was used by many people until contemporary times when it was then called Cecilia, named after the first postal clerk.

Pierre Guidry, the first settler of Cecilia, acquired three tracts of land from Mrs. Joseph Alexander Declouet in 1791. Joseph Angelle settled nearby soon after.

Both men apparently settled on lands that had been given to Declouet by a Spanish land grant dated May 16, 1772, that included some 2,600 acres (11 km^{2}) of land.

During the American Civil War, the settlement was also known as La Place. This name was dropped when postal authorities began to confuse it with the LaPlace in St. John the Baptist Parish.

Cecilia is the birthplace of several Louisiana political figures: state Representative and House Speaker Robert Joseph "Bob" Angelle (1896–1979), former Secretary of State of Louisiana and Lieutenant Governor Paul J. Hardy (born 1942), and former state Representatives J. Burton Angelle and Jesse J. Guidry, who became secretary of the Louisiana Department of Wildlife and Fisheries; Angelle from 1972 to 1980 and 1984 to 1988 and Guidry from 1981 to 1984. Former National Football League player Ramsey Dardar was also born in Cecilia.

Cecilia is the burial site of Louis Hebert, a Confederate general. On April 19, 1964, dedication ceremonies were held in a grove of live oaks on the banks of Bayou Teche about three miles (4.8 km) from Cecilia on Highway 328 to mark Hebert's grave. The marker reads as follows: "Approximately 100 yards (91 m) to the west is the probable resting place of General Louis Hebert, C. S. A. Born in Iberville Parish in 1820, Hebert graduated from West Point in 1845 third in his class. After an army service of two years, he resigned to manage his family's sugar interests. Before the war he was a member of the State Senate and Chief Engineer of Louisiana. He fought at Wilson's Creek, Elkhorn, Corinth, Vicksburg, and Port Fisher. He was an editor and teacher in Iberville and St. Martin parishes and lived until 1901." General Hebert taught at Huron Plantation near Cecilia and tutored children of Vincent Barras in St. Martinville.

Cecilia became one of the last remaining strongholds of the Cajun French language in Louisiana and 42.60% of the total population used the language for daily communication, including 20.25% of the children according to a study in 2013.

== Geography ==
Cecilia is located at 30°20′11″N 91°50′52″W (30.336379, -91.847867), in south central Louisiana; it lies within Acadiana, and the Lafayette metropolitan area. According to the United States Census Bureau, the CDP has a total area of 2.1 square miles (5.4 km^{2}), all land.

== Demographics ==
Historical population
Census	Pop.	Note	%±
1990	1,374		—
2000	1,505		9.5%
2010	1,980		31.6%
2020	1,807		−8.7%
U.S. Decennial Census; 1950 1960 1970 1980; 1990 2000 2010

Cecilia first appeared as a census designated place the 1990 U.S. census.

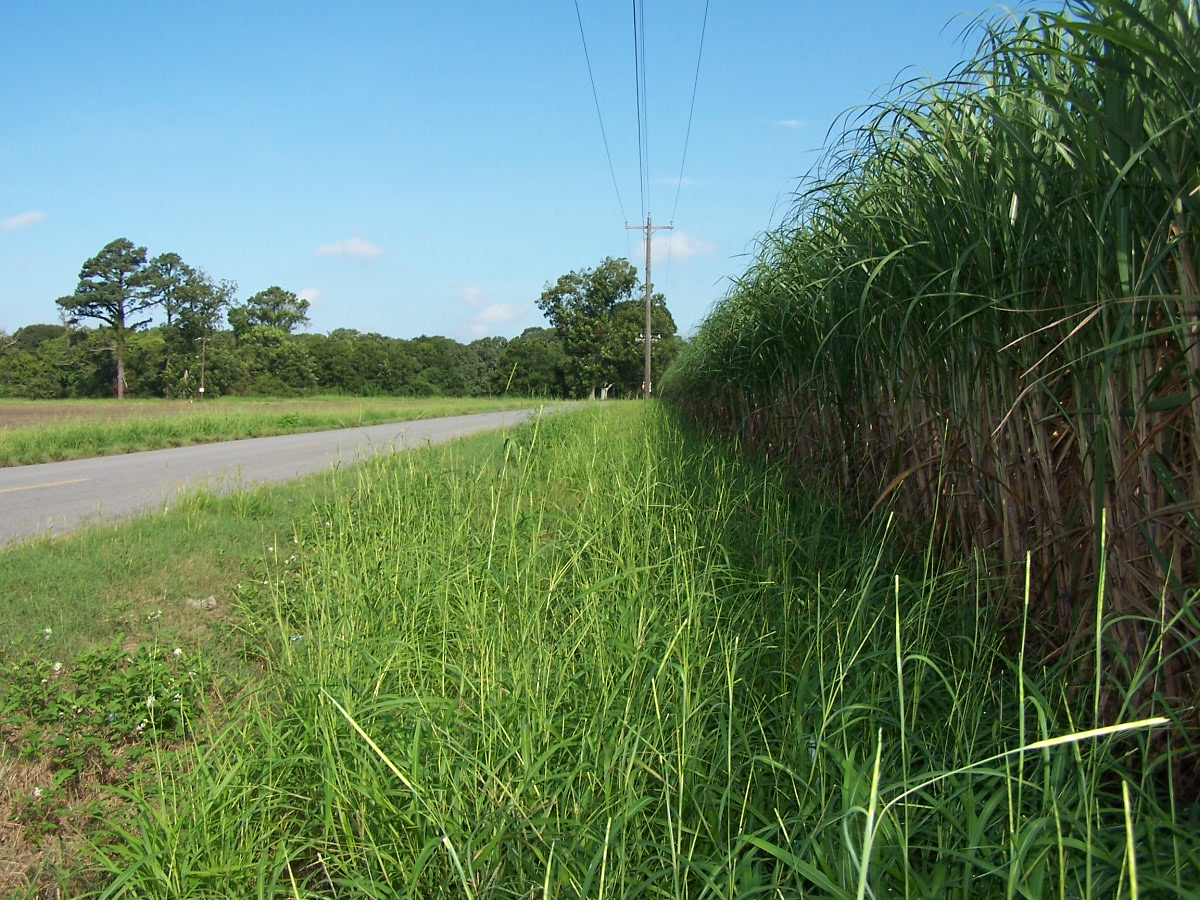
Sugar cane fields spread across the Cecilia surrounding area.

Cecilia has experienced relative population growth in St. Martin Parish. From the 2000 United States census, its population was 1,505; at the 2010 U.S. census, its population was 1,980. In 2019, the American Community Survey estimated that 1,917 people lived in the census-designated place. Among its population at the 2019 American Community Survey's 5 year estimates program, there were 955 males and 962 females living in the community; for every 100 females, there was an average of 99.3 males. The median age of the population was 34.2, with the majority being from 16 to 21 years and older.

The racial and ethnic makeup of Cecilia was 61.1% non-Hispanic white and 38.9% Black and African American in 2019. In 2000, its racial and ethnic makeup was 57.34% White American, 41.53% Black and African American, 0.53% American Indian and Alaska Native, 0.3% Asian alone, 0.27% from two or more races, and 1.6% Hispanic or Latin American of any race.

Spread throughout the total area of Cecilia, there were 471 family households, 116 other family households, and 229 non-family households. Approximately 27 households were male with no spouse present, and 89 female with no spouse present. Of the 825 housing units in the community, 700 were occupied; 467 were 1-unit detached homes, and 358 were mobile homes. An estimated 24.1% were renter-occupied, and 75.9% were owner-occupied units. The average household size of owner-occupied units was 2.95, and renter-occupied units had an average of 2.08 people. Home-owners had a median mortgage of $1,078 versus $344 without a mortgage; the median gross rent was $830. The median income for a household in 2019 was $49,063, and males had a median income of $52,439 versus $25,987 for females. About 18.3% of the CDP's population lived at or below the poverty line, down from 31.4% at the 2000 United States census.

== Education ==
Public schools in St. Martin Parish are operated by the St. Martin Parish School Board. The community of Cecilia is zoned to Cecilia Primary School (Grades PK-2), Teche Elementary School (Grades 3–5), Cecilia Junior High School (Grades 6–8), and Cecilia High School (Grades 9–12).
