= Earl K. Long Gymnasium =

University of Louisiana sports facility in Lafayette

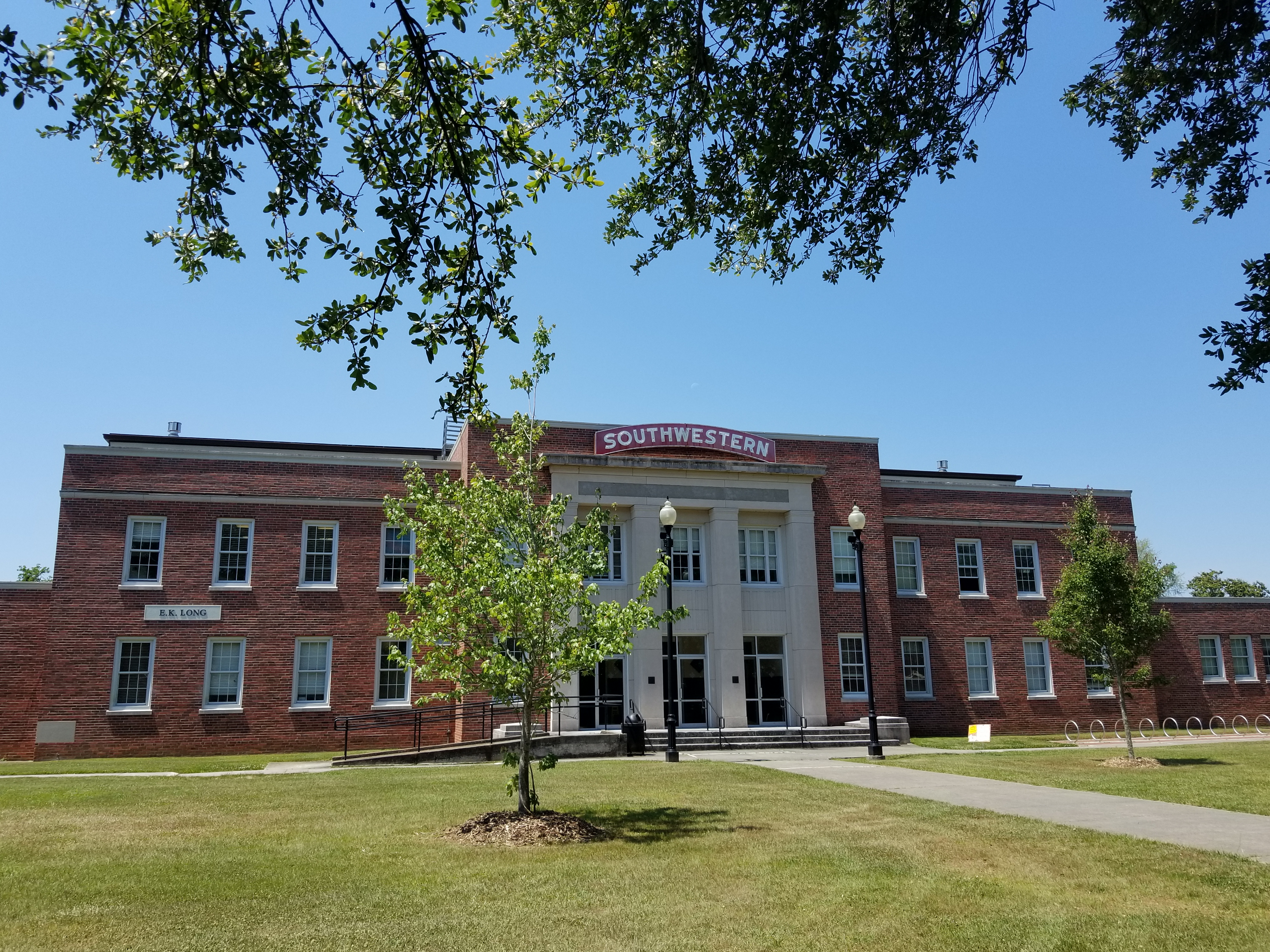
- Interactive map of Earl K. Long Gymnasium
- Location: 500 East Saint Mary Boulevard, Lafayette, Louisiana
- Coordinates: 30°12′40.9″N 92°1′7.9″W
- Owner: University of Louisiana at Lafayette
- Operator: University of Louisiana at Lafayette
- Capacity: Official: 1,121

Construction
- Opened: 1939
- Renovated: 1994, 2005, 2008, 2009

Tenants
- Men's basketball (NCAA) (1939–1950); Women's basketball (NCAA) (1971–2016; alternate: 2020–present); Volleyball (NCAA) (1976–present)

Earl K. Long Gymnasium is a 1,121-seat multi-purpose sports venue on the campus of the University of Louisiana at Lafayette in Lafayette, Louisiana. It is home of the Louisiana Ragin' Cajuns volleyball team. It was built in 1939 and named for Earl K. Long, who served as governor of Louisiana at the time. The gym was home to the Ragin' Cajuns' men's program until 1950, when the teams moved to Blackham Coliseum.

Located on the main campus, E. K. Long Gym houses all of the women's athletic administrative offices, including women's basketball, women's soccer, softball, and volleyball.

In years past, Women's basketball doubleheaders with the men's basketball team are played at the Cajundome while single games were played at the Gymnasium. Since 2017, all Women's Basketball games have been played at the Cajundome. In 2020, the March 5th contest between the Cajuns and the UT Arlington is scheduled to be played at the Gymnasium, the first women's basketball game to be played there since the WBI Championship Game in 2016.

== See also ==
- List of NCAA Division I basketball arenas
