= Savannah State Lady Tigers basketball =

Savannah State Lady Tigers
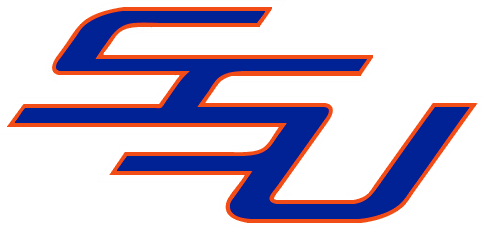
- University: Savannah State University
- Head coach: Cedric Baker (16th season)
- Location: Savannah, Georgia
- Arena: Tiger Arena (capacity: 6,000)
- Conference: SIAC
- Nickname: Lady Tigers
- Colors: Burnt orange and reflex blue

NCAA Division I tournament appearances
- 2015 (Division I)

Conference tournament champions
- 2015

Uniforms
Home	Away	Alternate

The Savannah State Lady Tigers women's basketball team represents Savannah State University in women's basketball. The school competes in the Southern Intercollegiate Athletic Conference (SIAC) in Division II of the National Collegiate Athletic Association (NCAA). The Lady Tigers play home games at Tiger Arena in Savannah, Georgia. The current head coach is Cedric Baker. Baker was named head coach on July 30, 2003.

On April 17, 2017, the school announced that it would return to Division II due to financial issues associated with competing in Division I. On December 7, 2017, the school announced it would rejoin Division II's Southern Intercollegiate Athletic Conference (SIAC) following the 2018–19 academic year, pending NCAA approval.

== History ==
The Lady Tigers began play in 1928. They began Division II play in 1974, going 339-394 until they joined Division I in 2002. Since the 2002–03 season, they have a 148–260 record, with one appearance in the NCAA Tournament. They won 5 SEAC titles (1952, 1953, 1954, 1955, 1956) and one SIAC title (1976). They have played in the MEAC since 2011, and they currently have a 35-45 all-time conference record. Savannah State beat Coppin State 66–52, North Carolina A&T State 62-59 and Maryland Eastern Shore 65–47 to win the MEAC Tournament in 2015 to go to their first NCAA Tournament in school history. They were beaten 81–48 in the First Round by South Carolina. The Lady Tigers finished 21–11, the best record in their history since playing in Division I.

== Postseason ==
=== NCAA Division I Tournament results ===
The Lady Tigers have appeared in the NCAA Division I women's basketball tournament one time. Their record is 0–1.

Year	Seed	Round	Opponent	Result
2015	16	First Round	(1) South Carolina	L 48–81

== Season-by-season record ==
NCAA Division I Independent SIAC (NCAA Division II) NCAA Division III NAIA Southeastern

Season	Wins	Losses	Conference Record	Head Coach	Notes	References
2009-10				Cedric Baker		
2008-09				Cedric Baker		
2007-08	14	15		Cedric Baker		
2006-07	12	17		Cedric Baker		
2005-06	4	24		Cedric Baker		
2004-05	6	22		Cedric Baker		
2003-04				Cedric Baker		
2002-03				Robert Eskew		
2001-02	4	24		Anita Walsh-Harris		
2000-01	7	20		Anita Walsh		
1999–2000	7	16		Anita Walsh		
1998-99					Savannah State placed on four years probation and scholarships were reduced in six sports	
1997-98						
1996-97						
1995-96				Carla Debro		
1994-95					SIAC Eastern Division Champions and first ever invitation to the NCAA Division II Championship tournament	
1993-94						
1992-93						
1991-92						
1990-91						
1989-90						
1988-89						
1987-88						
1986-87						
1985-86						
1984-85						
1983-84						
1982-83						
1981-82						
1980-81						
1979-80						
1978-79						
1977-78				Jimmie Westley		
1976-77				Jimmie Westley		
1975-76				Jimmie Westley		
1974-75				Jimmie Westley		
1973-74						
1972-73						
1971-72						
1970-71						
Totals	28	108		NCAA Division I-AA Independent results		
Totals				NCAA Division II results		
Totals				NCAA Division III results		
Totals				NAIA results		
Totals				Regular season results		
Totals				Playoff results		
Totals				All games including playoffs		

== Team awards and NCAA records ==
- Savannah State once held the NCAA Division I record for fewest points scored in a half (3 points) which occurred on November 23, 2003, against Florida State. That record has since been broken at least twice when 2 points were scored in a half, by Lipscomb against Western Kentucky on December 16, 2016, and by Ole Miss against South Carolina on January 30, 2020.
- In 1995 the Lady Tigers led the nation in field-goal percentage defense (32.2%).
- In 1984 the Lady Tigers led the nation in Average home game attendance (1,750 per game average).
