= Tiger Arena =

Multi-purpose arena in Savannah, Georgia

- Interactive map of Tiger Arena
- Location: Savannah State University; Savannah, Georgia
- Coordinates: 32.02376°N 81.0658°W
- Owner: Savannah State University
- Operator: Savannah State University
- Capacity: 5,000
- Surface: Hardwood

Construction
- Groundbreaking: May 23, 1998
- Opened: 2000
- Cost: $9.6 million ($17.9 million in 2025 dollars)

Tenants
- Savannah State Tigers (NCAA) (2000–present); Savannah Steam (AIF) (2015) Coastal Georgia Buccaneers

Tiger Arena is a 5,000-seat multi-purpose arena in Savannah, Georgia, United States. It is home to the Savannah State University Tigers men's and women's basketball teams and women's volleyball team. Tiger Arena has previously hosted the Georgia High School Association boys and girls playoffs (first round), the annual Georgia Athletic Coaches Association's North-South All-Star Game (2003–2008), and the Savannah Holiday Classic high school girls basketball tournament. It was also home to the Savannah Steam of American Indoor Football.

== Construction ==
The facility was opened in 2000 and cost $9.6 million to build. It replaced Willcox-Wiley Gymnasium, an athletic complex built in 1936.

== See also ==
- List of NCAA Division I basketball arenas
