= 2023–24 Alabama A&M Lady Bulldogs basketball team =

American college basketball season

2023–24 Alabama A&M Lady Bulldogs basketball
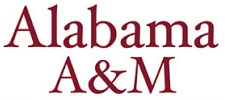
- Conference: Southwestern Athletic Conference
- Record: 15–16 (10–8 SWAC)
- Head coach: Margaret Richards (8th season)
- Assistant coaches: Larry McNeil; Freddie Murray
- Home arena: Alabama A&M Events Center

2023–24 SWAC women's basketball standings
	Conf.				Overall
Team	W		L	PCT	W		L	PCT
Jackson State †	18	–	0	1.000	26	–	7	.788
Grambling State	15	–	3	.833	23	–	10	.697
Southern	13	–	5	.722	15	–	15	.500
Arkansas–Pine Bluff	11	–	7	.611	17	–	16	.515
Alabama A&M	10	–	8	.556	15	–	16	.484
Florida A&M	8	–	10	.444	9	–	21	.300
Alcorn State	8	–	10	.444	12	–	20	.375
Prairie View A&M	7	–	11	.389	11	–	18	.379
Texas Southern	6	–	12	.333	7	–	22	.241
Bethune–Cookman	6	–	12	.333	15	–	16	.484
Mississippi Valley State	3	–	15	.167	4	–	27	.129
Alabama State	3	–	15	.167	3	–	26	.103
† 2024 SWAC tournament winner

The 2023–24 Alabama A&M Lady Bulldogs basketball team represented Alabama A&M University during the 2023–24 NCAA Division I women's basketball season. The Lady Bulldogs, who were led by eighth-year head coach Margaret Richards, played their home games at the Alabama A&M Events Center in Huntsville, Alabama as members of the Southwestern Athletic Conference.

== Previous season ==
The Lady Bulldogs finished the 2022–23 season 14–15, 12–6 in SWAC play to finish in a four-way tie for second place. They were upset by Arkansas–Pine Bluff in the first round of the SWAC tournament.

== Roster ==
2023–24 Alabama A&M Lady Bulldogs women's basketball team
Players
Coaches

Pos.	#	Name	Height	Year	Previous school	Hometown
G	0	Darian Burgin	5 ft 7 in (1.7 m)	Sr	Walnut Hills High School	Cincinnati, Ohio
F	1	Asianae Nicholson	5 ft 10 in (1.78 m)	So	Brush High School	South Euclid, Ohio
C	2	LaCambria Shakespeare	6 ft 4 in (1.93 m)	Jr	Collins Hill High School	Atlanta, Georgia
F	3	Alisha Wilson	6 ft 2 in (1.88 m)	Jr	Academy of Art	La Verne, California
G	4	Kaylah Turner	5 ft 6 in (1.68 m)	Fr	Oakleaf High School	Orange Park, Florida
G	10	Victoria Dixon	5 ft 5 in (1.65 m)	So	Tyler Junior College	Grand Prairie, Texas
G	11	Amiah Simmons	5 ft 9 in (1.75 m)	Jr	Biola	Overland Park, Kansas
F	12	Kailyn Nash	5 ft 10 in (1.78 m)	Jr	Central State	Muskegon, Michigan
F	14	Clemisha Prackett	6 ft 1 in (1.85 m)	Fr	Academies of West Memphis	West Memphis, Arkansas
G	15	Kalyn Ervin	5 ft 6 in (1.68 m)	Jr	Virginia State	Indianapolis, Indiana
F	20	Chynell Mitchell	6 ft 0 in (1.83 m)	Sr	Blinn College	Austin, Texas
F	21	Takya Walters-Norman	6 ft 1 in (1.85 m)	Fr	Carver High School	Montgomery, Alabama
G	23	Taylor Smith	5 ft 5 in (1.65 m)	Sr	Shelton State Community College	Fosters, Alabama
G	24	Emajin McCallop	5 ft 6 in (1.68 m)	So	Bishop Miege High School	Kansas City, Kansas
C	34	Jayla Cody	6 ft 1 in (1.85 m)	Sr	Central Arkansas	Valdosta, Georgia

Head coach

- Margaret Richards (Nebraska)

Assistant coach(es)

- Larry McNeil (Talladega)
- Freddie Murray (Jackson State)

Legend

- (C) Team captain
- (S) Suspended
- (I) Ineligible
- (W) Walk-on
- Injured
- Current redshirt

Roster
Last update: April 25, 2024

== Schedule and results ==
Date time, TV	Rank^{#}	Opponent^{#}	Result	Record	Site (attendance) city, state
Non-conference regular season
November 6, 2023*; 2:00 pm, ESPN+		at UAB	L 63–70	0–1	Bartow Arena (157); Birmingham, AL
November 9, 2023*; 7:30 pm, MW Network		at Colorado State	L 39–83	0–2	Moby Arena (1,052); Fort Collins, CO
November 18, 2023*; 2:00 pm		Tennessee Tech	W 62–56 ^{OT}	1–2	Alabama A&M Events Center (463); Huntsville, AL
November 21, 2023*; 5:00 pm		Alabama–Huntsville	W 74–44	2–2	Alabama A&M Events Center (295); Huntsville, AL
November 26, 2023*; 2:00 pm, SECN+		Auburn	L 45–68	2–3	Neville Arena (2,427); Auburn, AL
November 29, 2023*; 11:00 am		North Alabama	W 70–57	3–3	Alabama A&M Events Center (1,157); Huntsville, AL
December 10, 2023*; 2:00 pm		South Carolina State	W 62–44	4–3	Alabama A&M Events Center (831); Huntsville, AL
December 14, 2023*; 7:00 pm, SLN		at Kansas City	L 52–57	4–4	Swinney Recreation Center (530); Kansas City, MO
December 18, 2023*; 1:00 pm		vs. Chicago State; MTE Christmas Classic	W 80–43	5–4	Ocean Bank Convocation Center (331); Miami, FL
December 19, 2023*; 11:00 am, ESPN+		at FIU; MTE Christmas Classic	L 63–87	5–5	Ocean Bank Convocation Center (321); Miami, FL
December 20, 2023*; 1:00 pm		vs. Texas State; MTE Christmas Classic	L 52–63	5–6	Ocean Bank Convocation Center (–); Miami, FL
December 29, 2023*; 2:00 pm		Central Arkansas	L 59–65	5–7	Alabama A&M Events Center (1,103); Huntsville, AL
SWAC regular season
January 6, 2024; 3:00 pm		at Arkansas–Pine Bluff	L 67–75	5–8 (0–1)	H.O. Clemmons Arena (1,145); Pine Bluff, AR
January 8, 2024; 5:30 pm		at Mississippi Valley State	W 83–67	6–8 (1–1)	Harrison HPER Complex (1,974); Itta Bena, MS
January 11, 2024; 5:30 pm		Alcorn State	W 67–58	7–8 (2–1)	Alabama A&M Events Center (1,871); Huntsville, AL
January 13, 2024; 2:00 pm		Jackson State	L 41–70	7–9 (2–2)	Alabama A&M Events Center (1,533); Huntsville, AL
January 15, 2024; 4:00 pm		vs. Alabama State; Bridge Builder Classic	W 66–49	8–9 (3–2)	Mitchell Center (2,900); Mobile, AL
January 27, 2024; 12:00 pm		at Texas Southern	L 55–61	8–10 (3–3)	H&PE Arena (750); Houston, TX
January 29, 2024; 5:30 pm		at Prairie View A&M	L 59–65	8–11 (3–4)	William Nicks Building (789); Prairie View, TX
February 3, 2024; 2:00 pm		Florida A&M	W 71–69	9–11 (4–4)	Alabama A&M Events Center (1,491); Huntsville, AL
February 5, 2024; 5:30 pm		Bethune–Cookman	W 76–72 ^{OT}	10–11 (5–4)	Alabama A&M Events Center (1,361); Huntsville, AL
February 10, 2024; 3:00 pm		at Southern	L 60–67	10–12 (5–5)	F. G. Clark Center (1,929); Baton Rouge, LA
February 12, 2024; 5:30 pm		at Grambling State	L 52–69	10–13 (5–6)	Fredrick C. Hobdy Assembly Center (518); Grambling, LA
February 17, 2024; 12:00 pm		Mississippi Valley State	W 64–51	11–13 (6–6)	Alabama A&M Events Center (1,003); Huntsville, AL
February 19, 2024; 5:30 pm		Arkansas–Pine Bluff	W 67–59	12–13 (7–6)	Alabama A&M Events Center (941); Huntsville, AL
February 24, 2024; 1:00 pm		at Bethune–Cookman	W 63–58	13–13 (8–6)	Moore Gymnasium (441); Daytona Beach, FL
February 26, 2024; 4:30 pm		at Florida A&M	W 65–43	14–13 (9–6)	Al Lawson Center (412); Tallahassee, FL
March 2, 2024; 2:00 pm		Alabama State	W 58–47	15–13 (10–6)	Alabama A&M Events Center (5,127); Huntsville, AL
March 7, 2024; 5:30 pm		Grambling State	L 55–60	15–14 (10–7)	Alabama A&M Events Center (1,117); Huntsville, AL
March 9, 2024; 2:00 pm		Southern	L 50–59	15–15 (10–8)	Alabama A&M Events Center (711); Huntsville, AL
SWAC tournament
March 14, 2024; 5:30 pm, ESPN+	(5)	vs. (4) Arkansas–Pine Bluff; Quarterfinals	L 74–82	15–16	Bartow Arena (827); Birmingham, AL
*Non-conference game. ^{#}Rankings from AP Poll. (#) Tournament seedings in parentheses. All times are in Central.
