= 2023–24 Alabama State Lady Hornets basketball team =

American college basketball season

2023–24 Alabama State Lady Hornets basketball
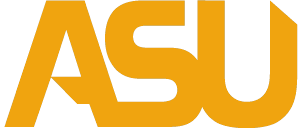
- Conference: Southwestern Athletic Conference
- Record: 3–26 (3–15 SWAC)
- Head coach: Freda Freeman-Jackson (26th season)
- Associate head coach: Clayton Harris
- Assistant coaches: Yvette McDaniel; Courtney Stephens
- Home arena: Dunn–Oliver Acadome

2023–24 SWAC women's basketball standings
	Conf.				Overall
Team	W		L	PCT	W		L	PCT
Jackson State †	18	–	0	1.000	26	–	7	.788
Grambling State	15	–	3	.833	23	–	10	.697
Southern	13	–	5	.722	15	–	15	.500
Arkansas–Pine Bluff	11	–	7	.611	17	–	16	.515
Alabama A&M	10	–	8	.556	15	–	16	.484
Florida A&M	8	–	10	.444	9	–	21	.300
Alcorn State	8	–	10	.444	12	–	20	.375
Prairie View A&M	7	–	11	.389	11	–	18	.379
Texas Southern	6	–	12	.333	7	–	22	.241
Bethune–Cookman	6	–	12	.333	15	–	16	.484
Mississippi Valley State	3	–	15	.167	4	–	27	.129
Alabama State	3	–	15	.167	3	–	26	.103
† 2024 SWAC tournament winner

The 2023–24 Alabama State Lady Hornets basketball team represented Alabama State University during the 2023–24 NCAA Division I women's basketball season. The Lady Hornets, who were led by 26th-year head coach Freda Freeman-Jackson, played their home games at the Dunn–Oliver Acadome in Montgomery, Alabama as members of the Southwestern Athletic Conference (SWAC).

== Previous season ==
The Lady Hornets finished the 2022–23 season 16–15, 12–6 in SWAC play, to finish in a four-way tie for second place. They defeated Bethune–Cookman in the quarterfinals of the SWAC tournament before being upset by #7 seed Arkansas–Pine Bluff in the semifinals.

== Roster ==
2023–24 Alabama State Hornets women's basketball team
Players
Coaches

Pos.	#	Name	Height	Year	Previous school	Hometown
F	0	Alyssa Green-White	5 ft 11 in (1.8 m)	So	Daytona State College	Upper Marlboro, MD
C	1	DonYeil Bolton	6 ft 4 in (1.93 m)	So	Kenwood Career Academy	Chicago, IL
F	2	Ryin Tillis	6 ft 1 in (1.85 m)	So	St. Francis School	Atlanta, GA
G	3	April Hooks	5 ft 8 in (1.73 m)	Fr	Hewitt-Trussville High School	Trussville, AL
G	4	DaKiyah Sanders	5 ft 4 in (1.63 m)	Jr	Ramsay High School	Birmingham, AL
G	5	Solangelei Akridge	5 ft 8 in (1.73 m)	Fr	Mater Dei Catholic High School	Spring Valley, CA
F	7	Summer Hicks	5 ft 11 in (1.8 m)	Fr	Marbury High School	Deatsville, AL
F	11	Justina Graham	5 ft 11 in (1.8 m)	Jr	Chipola College	Long Beach, CA
G	12	Kristian Jackson	5 ft 8 in (1.73 m)	So	Enterprise High School	Enterprise, AL
G	13	Ariana Simmons	5 ft 9 in (1.75 m)	Fr	Cox Mill High School	Concord, NC
G	15	Ashley Gray	5 ft 10 in (1.78 m)	So	Washington County High School	Washington, GA
F	20	Cordasia Harris	6 ft 1 in (1.85 m)	Sr	Bishop State Community College	Mobile, AL
G	24	Whitney Dunn	5 ft 9 in (1.75 m)	So	Loyola Chicago	Chicago, IL
C	30	Anaja Hall	6 ft 5 in (1.96 m)	Fr	St. Francis School	Atlanta, GA
F	33	Talayah Hamilton	5 ft 11 in (1.8 m)	So	Strom Thurmond High School	Johnston, SC
C	42	Camariyana Tavares	6 ft 3 in (1.91 m)	Fr	Rockvale High School	Murfreesboro, TN

Head coach

- Freda Freeman-Jackson (Alabama State)

Assistant coach(es)

- Clayton Harris (Alabama State)
- Yvette McDaniel (Georgia State)
- Courtney Stephens (Alabama State)

Legend

- (C) Team captain
- (S) Suspended
- (I) Ineligible
- (W) Walk-on
- Injured
- Current redshirt

Roster
Last update: May 28, 2024

== Schedule and results ==
Date time, TV	Rank^{#}	Opponent^{#}	Result	Record	Site (attendance) city, state
Exhibition
November 2, 2023*; 6:00 p.m.		Shorter	W 76–41	–	Dunn–Oliver Acadome (345); Montgomery, AL
Non-conference regular season
November 6, 2023*; 4:30 p.m., SECN+		at Alabama	L 39–93	0–1	Coleman Coliseum (1,264); Tuscaloosa, AL
November 9, 2023*; 7:00 p.m., ESPN+		at Memphis	L 51–95	0–2	Elma Roane Fieldhouse (1,444); Memphis, TN
November 11, 2023*; 2:00 p.m., ESPN+		at SMU	L 47–96	0–3	Moody Coliseum (549); University Park, TX
November 15, 2023*; 10:30 a.m., ESPN+		at No. 25 Oklahoma	L 46–92	0–4	Lloyd Noble Center (8,939); Norman, OK
November 18, 2023*; 5:00 p.m., ESPN+		at Samford	L 47–69	0–5	Pete Hanna Center (303); Homewood, AL
November 20, 2023*; 1:00 p.m., SECN+		at Vanderbilt	L 42–88	0–6	Memorial Gymnasium (1,612); Nashville, TN
November 30, 2023*; 6:00 p.m.		Jacksonville State	L 53–74	0–7	Dunn–Oliver Acadome (360); Montgomery, AL
December 13, 2023*; 7:00 p.m., SECN+		at Auburn	L 37–94	0–8	Neville Arena (2,246); Auburn, AL
December 17, 2023*; 2:00 p.m., FloHoops		at DePaul	L 69–98	0–9	Wintrust Arena (1,278); Chicago, IL
December 20, 2023*; 5:00 p.m., ACCNX		at No. 21 Florida State	L 45–110	0–10	Donald L. Tucker Center (1,244); Tallahassee, FL
December 28, 2023*; 11:00 a.m., ACCNX		at Miami (FL)	L 36–81	0–11	Watsco Center (2,227); Coral Gables, FL
SWAC regular season
January 6, 2024; 4:00 p.m.		at Mississippi Valley State	W 57–54	1–11 (1–0)	Harrison HPER Complex (2,305); Itta Bena, MS
January 8, 2024; 5:30 p.m.		at Arkansas–Pine Bluff	L 52–85	1–12 (1–1)	H.O. Clemmons Arena (1,103); Pine Bluff, AR
January 11, 2024; 5:30 p.m.		Jackson State	L 49–75	1–13 (1–2)	Dunn–Oliver Acadome (1,255); Montgomery, AL
January 13, 2024; 2:00 p.m.		Alcorn State	L 42–49	1–14 (1–3)	Dunn–Oliver Acadome (2,500); Montgomery, AL
January 15, 2024; 4:00 p.m.		vs. Alabama A&M; Bridge Builder Classic	L 49–66	1–15 (1–4)	Mitchell Center (2,900); Mobile, AL
January 27, 2024; 3:00 p.m.		at Prairie View A&M	L 43–46	1–16 (1–5)	William Nicks Building (595); Prairie View, TX
January 29, 2024; 5:30 p.m.		at Texas Southern	W 62–55	2–16 (2–5)	H&PE Arena (1,128); Houston, TX
February 3, 2024; 12:00 p.m., HBCU GO		Bethune–Cookman	W 56–53	3–16 (3–5)	Dunn–Oliver Acadome (3,200); Montgomery, AL
February 5, 2024; 5:30 p.m.		Florida A&M	L 40–49	3–17 (3–6)	Dunn–Oliver Acadome (2,727); Montgomery, AL
February 10, 2024; 2:00 p.m.		at Grambling State	L 48–65	3–18 (3–7)	Fredrick C. Hobdy Assembly Center (629); Grambling, LA
February 12, 2024; 3:00 p.m.		at Southern	L 63–79	3–19 (3–8)	F. G. Clark Center (1,528); Baton Rouge, LA
February 17, 2024; 2:00 p.m.		Arkansas–Pine Bluff	L 47–70	3–20 (3–9)	Dunn–Oliver Acadome (3,506); Montgomery, AL
February 19, 2024; 5:30 p.m.		Mississippi Valley State	L 59–67	3–21 (3–10)	Dunn–Oliver Acadome (–); Montgomery, AL
February 24, 2024; 1:00 p.m.		at Florida A&M	L 66–70	3–22 (3–11)	Al Lawson Center (356); Tallahassee, FL
February 26, 2024; 4:30 p.m.		at Bethune–Cookman	L 43–84	3–23 (3–12)	Moore Gymnasium (439); Daytona Beach, FL
March 2, 2024; 2:00 p.m.		at Alabama A&M	L 47–58	3–24 (3–13)	Alabama A&M Events Center (5,127); Huntsville, AL
March 7, 2024; 5:30 p.m.		Southern	L 49–61	3–25 (3–14)	Dunn–Oliver Acadome (2,100); Montgomery, AL
March 9, 2024; 2:00 p.m.		Grambling State	L 47–52	3–26 (3–15)	Dunn–Oliver Acadome (2,234); Montgomery, AL
*Non-conference game. ^{#}Rankings from AP poll. (#) Tournament seedings in parentheses. All times are in Central.
