= 2023–24 Jackson State Lady Tigers basketball team =

American college basketball season

2023–24 Jackson State Lady Tigers basketball

SWAC regular-season and tournament champions

NCAA tournament, first round
- Conference: Southwestern Athletic Conference
- Record: 26–7 (18–0 SWAC)
- Head coach: Tomekia Reed (5th season)
- Assistant coaches: LaShonda Cousin; Chase Campbell; Jonathan Williams
- Home arena: Williams Assembly Center

2023–24 SWAC women's basketball standings
	Conf.				Overall
Team	W		L	PCT	W		L	PCT
Jackson State †	18	–	0	1.000	26	–	7	.788
Grambling State	15	–	3	.833	23	–	10	.697
Southern	13	–	5	.722	15	–	15	.500
Arkansas–Pine Bluff	11	–	7	.611	17	–	16	.515
Alabama A&M	10	–	8	.556	15	–	16	.484
Florida A&M	8	–	10	.444	9	–	21	.300
Alcorn State	8	–	10	.444	12	–	20	.375
Prairie View A&M	7	–	11	.389	11	–	18	.379
Texas Southern	6	–	12	.333	7	–	22	.241
Bethune–Cookman	6	–	12	.333	15	–	16	.484
Mississippi Valley State	3	–	15	.167	4	–	27	.129
Alabama State	3	–	15	.167	3	–	26	.103
† 2024 SWAC tournament winner

The 2023–24 Jackson State Lady Tigers basketball team represented Jackson State University during the 2023–24 NCAA Division I women's basketball season. The Lady Tigers, led by fifth-year head coach Tomekia Reed, played their home games at the Williams Assembly Center in Jackson, Mississippi as members of the Southwestern Athletic Conference (SWAC).

The Lady Tigers finished the season 26–7, 18–0 in SWAC play, to win the SWAC regular-season championship. As a No. 1 seed in the WAC tournament, they defeated Prairie View A&M, Arkansas–Pine Bluff and Alcorn State to win the SWAC tournament, As a result, they received an automatic bid to the NCAA tournament as a No. 14 seed in the Portland Regional 3, where they lost in the first round to UConn.

== Previous season ==
The Lady Tigers finished the 2022–23 season 21–9, 17–1 in SWAC play, to win the SWAC regular-season championship. As a No. 1 seed in the WAC tournament, they defeated Grambling State in the quarterfinals before losing to Southern in the semifinals. They were invited to the WNIT, where they lost in the first round to Memphis.

== Roster ==
2023–24 Jackson State Tigers women's basketball team
Players
Coaches

Pos.	#	Name	Height	Year	Previous school	Hometown
G	1	Ti'Ian Boler	6 ft 1 in (1.85 m)	Sr	Meridian HS	Meridian, MS
C	5	Laila Walker	6 ft 5 in (1.96 m)	So	Harrison Central HS	Gulfport, MS
G	10	Keshuna Luckett	5 ft 8 in (1.73 m)	GS	Lanier HS	Jackson, MS
G	11	Madison Roshelle	5 ft 9 in (1.75 m)	Jr	Hamilton HS; Wabash Valley College	Cincinnati, OH
G	12	Mikayla Woods	5 ft 7 in (1.7 m)	GS	Hendrickson HS; Sam Houston	Pflugerville, TX
C	15	Angel Jackson	6 ft 6 in (1.98 m)	GS	Salesian Prep	Richmond, CA
G	20	Areyanna Hunter	5 ft 6 in (1.68 m)	Jr	Louisville HS	Louisville, MS
C	21	Daphane White	6 ft 5 in (1.96 m)	GS	St. Martin HS; Mississippi Gulf Coast CC	Gulfport, MS
G	22	Zakiya Mahoney	5 ft 10 in (1.78 m)	GS	Bishop O'Dowd HS; Mississippi Valley State	Oakland, CA
G	23	Ja'Leah Hickman	6 ft 0 in (1.83 m)	Jr	Newton HS	Newton, MS
G	24	Andriana Avent	6 ft 0 in (1.83 m)	RS Sr	Sacramento Charter HS; Texas Southern	Sacramento, CA
F	25	Alexis Roberts	6 ft 2 in (1.88 m)	Jr	MSD	Newton, MS
G	30	Hayleigh Breland	5 ft 7 in (1.7 m)	So	Stone HS	Wiggins, MS
F	35	Katelyn Brinkley	6 ft 2 in (1.88 m)	Fr	Ridgeland HS	Ridgeland, MS

Head coach

- Tomekia Reed (Georgia Southwestern State)

Assistant coach(es)

- LaShonda Cousin (Mississippi State)
- Chase Campbell (Paine College)
- Jonathan Williams (Faulkner)

Legend

- (C) Team captain
- (S) Suspended
- (I) Ineligible
- (W) Walk-on
- Injured
- Current redshirt

Roster
Last update: May 28, 2024

== Schedule ==
Date time, TV	Rank^{#}	Opponent^{#}	Result	Record	Site (attendance) city, state
Non-conference regular season
November 8, 2023*; 6:00 p.m.		LeMoyne–Owen	W 113–39	1–0	Williams Assembly Center (592); Jackson, MS
November 15, 2023*; 6:00 p.m.		Tougaloo	W 105–47	2–0	Williams Assembly Center (721); Jackson, MS
November 20, 2023*; 7:00 p.m., ESPN+		at Southeastern Louisiana	W 63–54	3–0	Pride Roofing University Center (712); Hammond, LA
November 23, 2023*; 2:00 p.m., FloSports		vs. UCF; Discover Puerto Rico Classic	L 54–63	3–1	Roberto Clemente Coliseum (250); San Juan, PR
November 24, 2023*; 8:00 p.m., FloSports		vs. Puerto Rico–Mayagüez; Discover Puerto Rico Classic	W 80–33	4–1	Roberto Clemente Coliseum (250); San Juan, PR
November 25, 2023*; 7:00 p.m., FloSports		vs. St. John's; Discover Puerto Rico Classic	W 60–56	5–1	Roberto Clemente Coliseum (250); San Juan, PR
December 1, 2023*; 6:30 p.m., ESPN+		at No. 14 Kansas State	L 37–79	5–2	Bramlage Coliseum (3,236); Manhattan, KS
December 9, 2023*; 8:00 p.m.		at Oregon State	L 58–78	5–3	Gill Coliseum (3,583); Corvallis, OR
December 14, 2023*; 6:30 p.m., SECN+/ESPN+		at Mississippi State	L 72–82	5–4	Humphrey Coliseum (4,423); Starkville, MS
December 20, 2023*; 6:00 p.m., ACCNX/ESPN+		at Miami (FL)	L 52–59	5–5	Watsco Center (2,117); Coral Gables, FL
December 27, 2023*; 7:00 p.m., LHN		at No. 5 Texas	L 52–97	5–6	Moody Center (5,988); Austin, TX
SWAC regular season
January 6, 2024; 12:00 p.m.		Alcorn State	W 74–46	6–6 (1–0)	Williams Assembly Center; Jackson, MS
January 11, 2024; 5:30 p.m.		at Alabama State	W 75–59	7–6 (2–0)	Dunn–Oliver Acadome (1,255); Montgomery, AL
January 13, 2024; 2:00 p.m.		at Alabama A&M	W 70–41	8–6 (3–0)	Alabama A&M Events Center (1,533); Huntsville, AL
January 20, 2024; 3:00 p.m.		Prairie View A&M	W 91–54	9–6 (4–0)	Williams Assembly Center (1,795); Jackson, MS
January 22, 2024; 5:30 p.m.		Texas Southern	W 75–50	10–6 (5–0)	Williams Assembly Center; Jackson, MS
January 27, 2024; 1:00 p.m.		at Bethune–Cookman	W 81–65	11–6 (6–0)	Moore Gymnasium (509); Daytona Beach, FL
January 29, 2024; 4:30 p.m.		at Florida A&M	W 79–60	12–6 (7–0)	Al Lawson Center (550); Tallahassee, FL
February 3, 2024; 3:00 p.m.		Grambling State	W 71–63	13–6 (8–0)	Williams Assembly Center (856); Jackson, MS
February 5, 2024; 5:30 p.m.		Southern	W 63–58	14–6 (9–0)	Williams Assembly Center (2,655); Jackson, MS
February 10, 2024; 4:00 p.m.		at Mississippi Valley State	W 70–54	15–6 (10–0)	Harrison HPER Complex (2,209); Itta Bena, MS
February 12, 2024; 5:30 p.m.		at Arkansas–Pine Bluff	W 72–56	16–6 (11–0)	H.O. Clemmons Arena; Pine Bluff, AR
February 17, 2024; 3:00 p.m.		Florida A&M	W 71–44	17–6 (12–0)	Williams Assembly Center (1,478); Jackson, MS
February 19, 2024; 5:30 p.m.		Bethune–Cookman	W 52–39	18–6 (13–0)	Williams Assembly Center; Jackson, MS
February 24, 2024; 1:00 p.m.		at Alcorn State	W 62–54	19–6 (14–0)	Davey Whitney Complex (968); Lorman, MS
March 2, 2024; 3:00 p.m.		at Texas Southern	W 101–51	20–6 (15–0)	H&PE Arena (1,350); Houston, TX
March 4, 2024; 3:00 p.m.		at Prairie View A&M	W 75–65	21–6 (16–0)	William Nicks Building (550); Prairie View, TX
March 7, 2024; 5:30 p.m.		Arkansas–Pine Bluff	W 82–67	22–6 (17–0)	Williams Assembly Center (1,752); Jackson, MS
March 9, 2024; 12:00 p.m.		Mississippi Valley State	W 77–59	23–6 (18–0)	Williams Assembly Center (3,170); Jackson, MS
SWAC women's tournament
March 13, 2024; 5:30 p.m., ESPN+	(1)	vs. (8) Prairie View A&M; Quarterfinals	W 67–58	24–6	Bartow Arena (1,024); Birmingham, AL
March 15, 2024; 11:00 a.m., ESPN+	(1)	vs. (4) Arkansas–Pine Bluff; Semifinals	W 70–48	25–6	Bartow Arena (1,072); Birmingham, AL
March 16, 2024; 4:30 p.m., ESPNU	(1)	vs. (6) Alcorn State; Championship	W 68–44	26–6	Bartow Arena (2,856); Birmingham, AL
NCAA women's tournament
March 23, 2024*; 12:00 p.m., ABC	(14 P3)	at (3 P3) No. 10 UConn; First round	L 64–86	26–7	Harry A. Gampel Pavilion (10,299); Storrs, CT
*Non-conference game. ^{#}Rankings from AP poll. (#) Tournament seedings in parentheses. P3=Portland 3. All times are in Central.

== See also ==
- 2023–24 Jackson State Tigers basketball team
