= 2023–24 Florida A&M Lady Rattlers basketball team =

American college basketball season

2023–24 Florida A&M Lady Rattlers basketball
- Conference: Southwestern Athletic Conference
- Record: 9–21 (8–10 SWAC)
- Head coach: Bridgette Gordon (1st season)
- Assistant coaches: Zenzele Apesemaka-Vital; Andonte Gennie; Jordan Harris
- Home arena: Al Lawson Center

2023–24 SWAC women's basketball standings
	Conf.				Overall
Team	W		L	PCT	W		L	PCT
Jackson State †	18	–	0	1.000	26	–	7	.788
Grambling State	15	–	3	.833	23	–	10	.697
Southern	13	–	5	.722	15	–	15	.500
Arkansas–Pine Bluff	11	–	7	.611	17	–	16	.515
Alabama A&M	10	–	8	.556	15	–	16	.484
Florida A&M	8	–	10	.444	9	–	21	.300
Alcorn State	8	–	10	.444	12	–	20	.375
Prairie View A&M	7	–	11	.389	11	–	18	.379
Texas Southern	6	–	12	.333	7	–	22	.241
Bethune–Cookman	6	–	12	.333	15	–	16	.484
Mississippi Valley State	3	–	15	.167	4	–	27	.129
Alabama State	3	–	15	.167	3	–	26	.103
† 2024 SWAC tournament winner

The 2023–24 Florida A&M Lady Rattlers basketball team represented Florida A&M University during the 2023–24 NCAA Division I women's basketball season. The Lady Rattlers, who were led by first-year head coach Bridgette Gordon, played their home games at the Al Lawson Center in Tallahassee, Florida as members of the Southwestern Athletic Conference (SWAC).

== Previous season ==
The Lady Rattlers finished the 2022–23 season 6–23, 4–14 in SWAC play, to finish in tenth place. Since only the top eight teams qualify for the SWAC tournament, the Lady Rattlers failed to qualify.

On July 6, 2023, head coach Shalon Pillow announced her resignation after three years, two as head coach, with the program. On July 28, New Mexico State assistant coach Bridgette Gordon was named the team's next head coach.

== Roster ==
2023–24 Florida A&M Lady Rattlers women's basketball team
Players
Coaches

Pos.	#	Name	Height	Year	Previous school	Hometown
F	1	Nashani Gilbert	5 ft 10 in (1.78 m)	Jr	Daytona State College	West Palm Beach, FL
C	2	Skylar Baltezegar	6 ft 2 in (1.88 m)	Jr	Charleston Southern	Orange Park, FL
G	3	Aina Subirats	5 ft 8 in (1.73 m)	So	Morehead State	Barcelona, Spain
G	4	Amiyah Lloyd	5 ft 6 in (1.68 m)	Fr	Riverview High School	Sarasota, FL
PG	5	Ahriahna Grizzle	5 ft 9 in (1.75 m)	GS	Alabama	Toronto, ON
F	11	Sydney Hendrix	5 ft 11 in (1.8 m)	Fr	West Bloomfield High School	Farmington Hills, MI
C	12/25	Jaliya Sharp	6 ft 3 in (1.91 m)	Jr	UNC Wilmington	Garland, TX
G	13	Ivet Subirats	5 ft 9 in (1.75 m)	Sr	Ball State	Barcelona, Spain
F/C	15	Hailee Brennen	6 ft 3 in (1.91 m)	So	Daytona State College	DeBary, FL
F/C	24	Anabel Latorre	6 ft 2 in (1.88 m)	Sr	Middle Tennessee	Zaragoza, Spain
G	30	Olivia Delancy	6 ft 0 in (1.83 m)	So	St. Petersburg College	St. Petersburg, FL
G	32	Nya Bostic	5 ft 7 in (1.7 m)	Sr	Tallahassee Community College	Decatur, GA
F	44	Eliya Ellis	6 ft 1 in (1.85 m)	Jr	Clear Creek High School	League City, TX

Head coach

- Bridgette Gordon (Tennessee)

Assistant coach(es)

- Zenzele Apesemaka-Vital (Cincinnati)
- Andonte Gennie (Georgia Southern)
- Jordan Harris (Morehouse)

Legend

- (C) Team captain
- (S) Suspended
- (I) Ineligible
- (W) Walk-on
- Injured
- Current redshirt

Roster
Last update: April 25, 2024

== Schedule and results ==
Date time, TV	Rank^{#}	Opponent^{#}	Result	Record	Site (attendance) city, state
Non-conference regular season
November 7, 2023*; 6:30 p.m., SECN+		at No. 11 Tennessee	L 64–93	0–1	Thompson–Boling Arena (7,684); Knoxville, TN
November 9, 2023*; 11:30 a.m., ESPN+		at Middle Tennessee	L 48–93	0–2	Murphy Center (6,000); Murfreesboro, TN
November 13, 2023*; 8:00 p.m., SECN		at Florida	L 54–92	0–3	O'Connell Center (1,137); Gainesville, FL
November 20, 2023*; 4:00 p.m., ESPN+		California	L 38–76	0–4	Al Lawson Center (887); Tallahassee, FL
November 25, 2023*; 2:00 p.m., Rattlers+		Jacksonville	W 59–54	1–4	Al Lawson Center (165); Tallahassee, FL
December 1, 2023*; 12:00 p.m., ESPN+		at Sam Houston	L 62–65	1–5	Bernard Johnson Coliseum (428); Huntsville, TX
December 3, 2023*; 3:00 p.m., ESPN+		at Houston	L 59–79	1–6	Fertitta Center (1,160); Houston, TX
December 8, 2023*; 5:30 p.m.		South Alabama	L 65–68	1–7	Al Lawson Center (247); Tallahassee, FL
December 21, 2023*; 1:00 p.m., ESPN+		at Detroit Mercy	L 66–72	1–8	Calihan Hall (289); Detroit, MI
December 22, 2023*; 1:00 p.m., B1G+		at Michigan	L 35–77	1–9	Crisler Center (2,308); Ann Arbor, MI
December 29, 2023*; 7:00 p.m., ESPN+		at North Florida	L 71–76 ^{OT}	1–10	UNF Arena (559); Jacksonville, FL
SWAC regular season
January 6, 2024; 2:00 p.m.		at Bethune–Cookman	L 76–80	1–11 (0–1)	Moore Gymnasium (981); Daytona Beach, FL
January 13, 2024; 2:00 p.m., Rattlers+		Southern	W 59–53	2–11 (1–1)	Al Lawson Center (1,087); Tallahassee, FL
January 15, 2024; 5:30 p.m., Rattlers+		Grambling State	L 85–88 ^{3OT}	2–12 (1–2)	Al Lawson Center (740); Tallahassee, FL
January 20, 2024; 2:00 p.m.		at Arkansas–Pine Bluff	L 62–85	2–13 (1–3)	H.O. Clemmons Arena (1,281); Pine Bluff, AR
January 22, 2024; 6:30 p.m.		at Mississippi Valley State	W 62–55	3–13 (2–3)	Harrison HPER Complex (1,025); Itta Bena, MS
January 27, 2024; 2:00 p.m., Rattlers+		Alcorn State	W 60–56	4–13 (3–3)	Al Lawson Center (989); Tallahassee, FL
January 29, 2024; 5:30 p.m., Rattlers+		Jackson State	L 60–79	4–14 (3–4)	Al Lawson Center (550); Tallahassee, FL
February 3, 2024; 3:00 p.m.		at Alabama A&M	L 69–71	4–15 (3–5)	Alabama A&M Events Center (1,491); Huntsville, AL
February 5, 2024; 6:30 p.m.		at Alabama State	W 49–40	5–15 (4–5)	Dunn–Oliver Acadome (2,727); Montgomery, AL
February 10, 2024; 2:00 p.m., Rattlers+		Texas Southern	W 71–57	6–15 (5–5)	Al Lawson Center (313); Tallahassee, FL
February 12, 2024; 5:30 p.m., Rattlers+		Prairie View A&M	W 71–63	7–15 (6–5)	Al Lawson Center (241); Tallahassee, FL
February 17, 2024; 2:00 p.m.		at Jackson State	L 44–71	7–16 (6–6)	Williams Assembly Center (1,478); Jackson, MS
February 19, 2024; 6:30 p.m.		at Alcorn State	L 49–64	7–17 (6–7)	Davey Whitney Complex (832); Lorman, MS
February 24, 2024; 2:00 p.m., Rattlers+		Alabama State	W 70–66	8–17 (7–7)	Al Lawson Center (356); Tallahassee, FL
February 26, 2024; 5:30 p.m., Rattlers+		Alabama A&M	L 43–65	8–18 (7–8)	Al Lawson Center (412); Tallahassee, FL
March 2, 2024; 3:00 p.m.		at Grambling State	L 54–65	8–19 (7–9)	Fredrick C. Hobdy Assembly Center (916); Grambling, LA
March 4, 2024; 6:30 p.m.		at Southern	L 61–67	8–20 (7–10)	F. G. Clark Center (3,853); Baton Rouge, LA
March 9, 2024; 2:00 p.m., Rattlers+		Bethune–Cookman	W 69–65	9–20 (8–10)	Al Lawson Center (998); Tallahassee, FL
SWAC tournament
March 13, 2024; 12:00 p.m., ESPN+	(7)	vs. (2) Grambling State; Quarterfinals	L 60–66	9–21	Bartow Arena (428); Birmingham, AL
*Non-conference game. ^{#}Rankings from AP poll. (#) Tournament seedings in parentheses. All times are in Eastern.
