= 2023–24 Texas Southern Lady Tigers basketball team =

American college basketball season

2023–24 Texas Southern Lady Tigers basketball
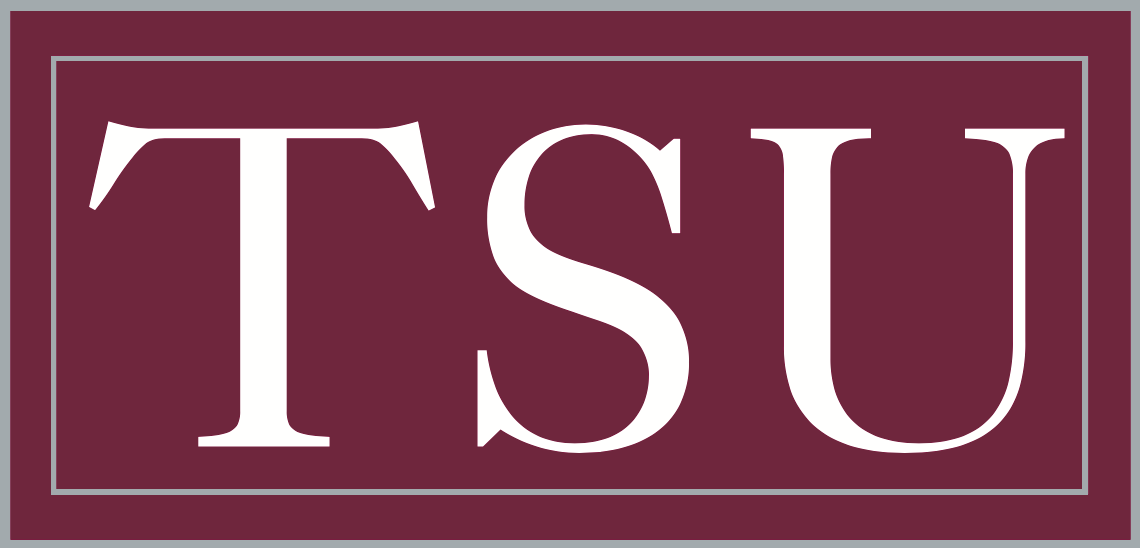
- Conference: Southwestern Athletic Conference
- Record: 7–22 (5–12 SWAC)
- Head coach: Vernette Skeete (2nd season)
- Assistant coaches: Mercedes Brooks; India Elliott; Danielle King
- Home arena: Health and Physical Education Arena

2023–24 SWAC women's basketball standings
	Conf.				Overall
Team	W		L	PCT	W		L	PCT
Jackson State †	18	–	0	1.000	26	–	7	.788
Grambling State	15	–	3	.833	23	–	10	.697
Southern	13	–	5	.722	15	–	15	.500
Arkansas–Pine Bluff	11	–	7	.611	17	–	16	.515
Alabama A&M	10	–	8	.556	15	–	16	.484
Florida A&M	8	–	10	.444	9	–	21	.300
Alcorn State	8	–	10	.444	12	–	20	.375
Prairie View A&M	7	–	11	.389	11	–	18	.379
Texas Southern	6	–	12	.333	7	–	22	.241
Bethune–Cookman	6	–	12	.333	15	–	16	.484
Mississippi Valley State	3	–	15	.167	4	–	27	.129
Alabama State	3	–	15	.167	3	–	26	.103
† 2024 SWAC tournament winner

The 2023–24 Texas Southern Lady Tigers basketball team represented Texas Southern University during the 2023–24 NCAA Division I women's basketball season. The Lady Tigers, who were led by second-year head coach Vernette Skeete, played their home games at the Health and Physical Education Arena located in Houston, Texas, as members of the Southwestern Athletic Conference (SWAC).

== Previous season ==
The Lady Tigers finished the 2022–23 season 2–27, 2–16 in SWAC play, to finish in eleventh place. Since only the top eight teams qualify for the SWAC tournament, the Lady Tigers failed to qualify.

== Roster ==
2023–24 Texas Southern Lady Tigers women's basketball team
Players
Coaches

Pos.	#	Name	Height	Year	Previous school	Hometown
G	1	Tatyanna Clayburne	5 ft 8 in (1.73 m)	RS So	Cal State Bakersfield	Gilbert, AZ
G	2	Daeja Holmes	5 ft 9 in (1.75 m)	Jr	Fresno City College	Fresno, CA
G	3	Taniya Lawson	5 ft 8 in (1.73 m)	So	Archbishop Carroll High School	Capitol Heights, MD
G	4	Nya Harmon	5 ft 7 in (1.7 m)	Jr	Texas A&M–Commerce	Dallas, TX
F/C	5	Jaida Belton	6 ft 4 in (1.93 m)	So	New Hope Academy	Baltimore, MD
G	10	Maci Quiller	5 ft 11 in (1.8 m)	Fr	Hendrickson High School	Pflugerville, TX
F/C	11	Imani Morris	6 ft 3 in (1.91 m)	Fr	Duncanville High School	Cedar Hill, TX
G	12	Gretta Galban	5 ft 9 in (1.75 m)	Fr	Concello De Vigo	Galicia, Spain
G	15	Alisa Knight	5 ft 11 in (1.8 m)	Jr	Cedar Park High School	Cedar Park, TX
F/C	20	Jordyn Turner	6 ft 2 in (1.88 m)	Jr	UT Arlington	Oklahoma City, OK
G	21	Shomari Phillips	5 ft 11 in (1.8 m)	Jr	Indian River State College	Winter Haven, FL
G	22	Kamaya Middleton	5 ft 6 in (1.68 m)	So	Cajon High School	San Bernardino, CA
G	23	Ashara Spruill	5 ft 9 in (1.75 m)	Fr	Uwharrie Charter Academy	Asheboro, NC
G	24	Anela Thomas	5 ft 8 in (1.73 m)	So	Saint Mary's	Oakland, CA

Head coach

- Vernette Skeete (Alcorn State)

Assistant coach(es)

- Mercedes Brooks (LSU)
- India Elliott (Coker)
- Danielle King (Marquette)

Legend

- (C) Team captain
- (S) Suspended
- (I) Ineligible
- (W) Walk-on
- Injured
- Current redshirt

Roster
Last update: May 26, 2024

== Schedule and results ==
Date time, TV	Rank^{#}	Opponent^{#}	Result	Record	Site (attendance) city, state
Non-conference regular season
November 6, 2023*; 6:00 p.m., MW Network		at New Mexico	L 59–76	0–1	The Pit (5,055); Albuquerque, NM
November 14, 2023*; 11:00 a.m., YouTube		North American	W 109–67	1–1	H&PE Arena (883); Houston, TX
November 17, 2023*; 10:00 a.m., ESPN+		at Old Dominion	L 38–57	1–2	Chartway Arena (2,552); Norfolk, VA
November 20, 2023*; 7:00 p.m., SECN+		at No. 7 LSU	L 47–106	1–3	Pete Maravich Assembly Center (10,787); Baton Rouge, LA
November 22, 2023*; 7:00 p.m., YouTube		Stephen F. Austin	L 58–73	1–4	H&PE Arena (377); Houston, TX
November 29, 2023*; 7:00 p.m., ESPN+		at Rice	L 44–74	1–5	Tudor Fieldhouse (591); Houston, TX
December 12, 2023*; 11:00 a.m., ESPN+		at Houston	L 42–89	1–6	Fertitta Center (3,658); Houston, TX
December 15, 2023*; 6:30 p.m., ESPN+		at Tulsa	L 45–82	1–7	Reynolds Center (1,153); Tulsa, OK
December 18, 2023*; 5:30 p.m., YouTube		Omaha	L 63–68	1–8	H&PE Arena (300); Houston, TX
December 20, 2023*; 2:00 p.m., YouTube		California Baptist	L 62–83	1–9	H&PE Arena (150); Houston, TX
December 30, 2023*; 2:00 p.m., YouTube		Tarleton State	L 40–52	1–10	H&PE Arena (340); Houston, TX
SWAC regular season
January 6, 2024; 3:00 p.m.		at Southern	L 45–64	1–11 (0–1)	F. G. Clark Center (1,859); Baton Rouge, LA
January 8, 2024; 5:30 p.m.		at Grambling State	W 72–67	2–11 (1–1)	Fredrick C. Hobdy Assembly Center (268); Grambling, LA
January 13, 2024; 3:00 p.m.		Arkansas–Pine Bluff	W 85–80	3–11 (2–1)	H&PE Arena (346); Houston, TX
January 15, 2024; 12:00 p.m.		Mississippi Valley State	L 69–70	3–12 (2–2)	H&PE Arena (–); Houston, TX
January 20, 2024; 1:00 p.m.		at Alcorn State	L 51–69	3–13 (2–3)	Davey Whitney Complex (252); Lorman, MS
January 22, 2024; 5:30 p.m.		at Jackson State	L 50–75	3–14 (2–4)	Williams Assembly Center (–); Jackson, MS
January 27, 2024; 12:00 p.m., HBCU GO		Alabama A&M	W 61–55	4–14 (3–4)	H&PE Arena (750); Houston, TX
January 29, 2024; 5:30 p.m.		Alabama State	L 55–62	4–15 (3–5)	H&PE Arena (1,128); Houston, TX
February 3, 2024; 3:00 p.m.		at Prairie View A&M	L 65–78	4–16 (3–6)	William Nicks Building (1,406); Prairie View, TX
February 10, 2024; 1:00 p.m.		at Florida A&M	L 57–71	4–17 (3–7)	Al Lawson Center (313); Tallahassee, FL
February 12, 2024; 4:30 p.m.		at Bethune–Cookman	W 65–64	5–17 (4–7)	Moore Gymnasium (401); Daytona Beach, FL
February 17, 2024; 3:00 p.m.		Grambling State	L 55–60	5–18 (4–8)	H&PE Arena (2,863); Houston, TX
February 19, 2024; 5:30 p.m.		Southern	L 52–68	5–19 (4–9)	H&PE Arena (1,247); Houston, TX
February 24, 2024; 4:00 p.m.		at Mississippi Valley State	L 65–71	5–20 (4–10)	Harrison HPER Complex (1,500); Itta Bena, MS
February 26, 2024; 5:30 p.m.		at Arkansas–Pine Bluff	L 62–81	5–21 (4–11)	H.O. Clemmons Arena (768); Pine Bluff, AR
March 2, 2024; 3:00 p.m.		Jackson State	L 51–101	5–22 (4–12)	H&PE Arena (1,350); Houston, TX
March 4, 2024; 5:30 p.m.		Alcorn State	W 71–63	6–22 (5–12)	H&PE Arena (730); Houston, TX
March 9, 2024; 3:00 p.m.		Prairie View A&M	W 83–70	7–22 (6–12)	H&PE Arena (3,612); Houston, TX
*Non-conference game. ^{#}Rankings from AP poll. (#) Tournament seedings in parentheses. All times are in Central.
