= 2023–24 Alcorn State Lady Braves basketball team =

American college basketball season

2023–24 Alcorn State Lady Braves basketball
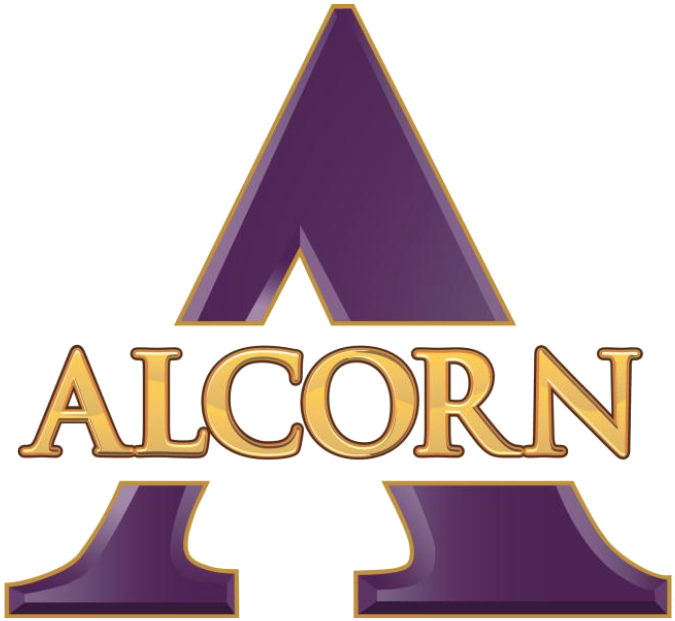
- Conference: Southwestern Athletic Conference
- Record: 12–20 (8–10 SWAC)
- Head coach: Nate Kilbert (4th season)
- Associate head coach: Elvis Robinson
- Assistant coaches: Lisa Powell; Joncyee Sanders
- Home arena: Davey Whitney Complex

2023–24 SWAC women's basketball standings
	Conf.				Overall
Team	W		L	PCT	W		L	PCT
Jackson State †	18	–	0	1.000	26	–	7	.788
Grambling State	15	–	3	.833	23	–	10	.697
Southern	13	–	5	.722	15	–	15	.500
Arkansas–Pine Bluff	11	–	7	.611	17	–	16	.515
Alabama A&M	10	–	8	.556	15	–	16	.484
Florida A&M	8	–	10	.444	9	–	21	.300
Alcorn State	8	–	10	.444	12	–	20	.375
Prairie View A&M	7	–	11	.389	11	–	18	.379
Texas Southern	6	–	12	.333	7	–	22	.241
Bethune–Cookman	6	–	12	.333	15	–	16	.484
Mississippi Valley State	3	–	15	.167	4	–	27	.129
Alabama State	3	–	15	.167	3	–	26	.103
† 2024 SWAC tournament winner

The 2023–24 Alcorn State Lady Braves basketball team represented Alcorn State University during the 2023–24 NCAA Division I women's basketball season. The Lady Braves, who were led by fourth-year head coach Nate Kilbert, played their home games at the Davey Whitney Complex in Lorman, Mississippi as members of the Southwestern Athletic Conference (SWAC).

The Lady Braves finished the season 12–20, 8–10 in SWAC play, to finish in a tie for sixth place. In the SWAC tournament, they upset third-seeded Southern in the quarterfinals and second-seeded Grambling State in the semifinals before falling to top-seeded Jackson State in the championship game.

== Previous season ==
The Lady Braves finished the 2022–23 season 12–17, 8–10 in SWAC play, to finish in ninth place. Since only the top eight teams qualify for the SWAC tournament, the Lady Braves failed to qualify.

== Roster ==
2023–24 Alcorn State Lady Braves women's basketball team
Players
Coaches

Pos.	#	Name	Height	Year	Previous school	Hometown
G	0	Jazmine Jackson	5 ft 8 in (1.73 m)	So	Charleston Southern	Jacksonville, FL
G	1	Ashanti Backus	5 ft 4 in (1.63 m)	Sr	Coahoma Community College	Little Rock, AR
G/F	2	Nakia Cheatham	6 ft 0 in (1.83 m)	Sr	Coahoma Community College	Clarksdale, MS
G	3	Nia McCalphia	5 ft 5 in (1.65 m)	Sr	Newton High School	Newton, MS
G	4	Kailyn Watkins	5 ft 6 in (1.68 m)	GS	Crenshaw High School	Inglewood, CA
F	5	Destiny Brown	6 ft 3 in (1.91 m)	Jr	College of Southern Nevada	Los Angeles, CA
G	11	Zy'nyia White	5 ft 6 in (1.68 m)	Jr	Hazlehurst High School	Hazlehurst, MS
F	14	Arene Iyekekpolor	6 ft 0 in (1.83 m)	Fr	Harry Ainlay High School	Edmonton, AB
G	15	Jeanee Anderson	5 ft 7 in (1.7 m)	Sr	Coahoma Community College	Greenville, MS
F	21	Akyriale Ford	6 ft 2 in (1.88 m)	GS	Hinds Community College	Crystal Springs, MS
G/F	24	Kiarra Henderson	5 ft 9 in (1.75 m)	Sr	Colby Community College	Fort Worth, TX
F	25	Tyginae Wright	5 ft 9 in (1.75 m)	GS	Paul Robeson High School	Brooklyn, NY
G	30	Maya Claytor	5 ft 6 in (1.68 m)	Jr	Kahuku High & Intermediate School	Wahiawa, HI
F	32	Milia Gibson	5 ft 10 in (1.78 m)	GS	Mississippi Valley State	Richmond, CA

Head coach

- Nate Kilbert (Mississippi Valley State)

Assistant coach(es)

- Elvis Robinson (Mississippi Valley State)
- Lisa Powell (Alcorn State)
- Joncyee Sanders (Mississippi Valley State)

Legend

- (C) Team captain
- (S) Suspended
- (I) Ineligible
- (W) Walk-on
- Injured
- Current redshirt

Roster
Last update: April 25, 2024

== Schedule and results ==
Date time, TV	Rank^{#}	Opponent^{#}	Result	Record	Site (attendance) city, state
Non-conference regular season
November 6, 2023*; 6:30 p.m., SECN+		at No. 25 Mississippi State	L 42–77	0–1	Humphrey Coliseum (4,452); Starkville, MS
November 14, 2023*; 7:00 p.m., B1G+		at Nebraska	L 32–79	0–2	Pinnacle Bank Arena (3,917); Lincoln, NE
November 21, 2023*; 6:30 p.m., ESPN+		at New Orleans	L 42–53	0–3	Lakefront Arena (493); New Orleans, LA
November 26, 2023*; 2:00 p.m., ESPN+		at No. 14 Baylor	L 47–93	0–4	Ferrell Center (3,709); Waco, TX
November 30, 2023*; 6:00 p.m.		Nicholls	W 54–46	1–4	Davey Whitney Complex (152); Lorman, MS
December 3, 2023*; 1:00 p.m.		Arkansas Baptist	W 78–45	2–4	Davey Whitney Complex (152); Lorman, MS
December 9, 2023*; 2:00 p.m., ESPN+		at North Texas	L 50–84	2–5	The Super Pit (1,375); Denton, TX
December 16, 2023*; 2:00 p.m., ESPN+		at Louisiana Tech	L 47–49	2–6	Thomas Assembly Center (1,712); Ruston, LA
December 20, 2023*; 12:00 p.m.		New Orleans	L 59–83	2–7	Davey Whitney Complex (35); Lorman, MS
December 28, 2023*; 6:00 p.m., FloHoops		at DePaul	L 39–77	2–8	Wintrust Arena (1,183); Chicago, IL
December 30, 2023*; 3:00 p.m., SECN+		at Ole Miss	L 37–76	2–9	SJB Pavilion (2,266); Oxford, MS
SWAC regular season
January 6, 2024; 12:00 p.m.		at Jackson State	L 46–74	2–10 (0–1)	Williams Assembly Center (–); Jackson, MS
January 11, 2024; 5:30 p.m.		at Alabama A&M	L 58–67	2–11 (0–2)	Alabama A&M Events Center (1,871); Huntsville, AL
January 13, 2024; 2:00 p.m.		at Alabama State	W 49–42	3–11 (1–2)	Dunn–Oliver Acadome (2,500); Montgomery, AL
January 20, 2024; 1:00 p.m.		Texas Southern	W 69–51	4–11 (2–2)	Davey Whitney Complex (252); Lorman, MS
January 22, 2024; 5:00 p.m.		Prairie View A&M	L 55–61	4–12 (2–3)	Davey Whitney Complex (1,252); Lorman, MS
January 20, 2024; 1:00 p.m.		at Florida A&M	L 56–60	4–13 (2–4)	Al Lawson Center (989); Tallahassee, FL
January 29, 2024; 4:00 p.m.		at Bethune–Cookman	L 58–66	4–14 (2–5)	Moore Gymnasium (443); Daytona Beach, FL
February 3, 2024; 1:00 p.m.		Southern	L 58–61	4–15 (2–6)	Davey Whitney Complex (820); Lorman, MS
February 5, 2024; 5:30 p.m.		Grambling State	L 55–72	4–16 (2–7)	Davey Whitney Complex (752); Lorman, MS
February 10, 2024; 12:05 p.m.		at Arkansas–Pine Bluff	L 57–80	4–17 (2–8)	H.O. Clemmons Arena (2,306); Pine Bluff, AR
February 12, 2024; 5:30 p.m.		at Mississippi Valley State	W 70–65	5–17 (3–8)	Harrison HPER Complex (2,025); Itta Bena, MS
February 17, 2024; 1:00 p.m.		Bethune–Cookman	W 51–40	6–17 (4–8)	Davey Whitney Complex (752); Lorman, MS
February 19, 2024; 5:30 p.m.		Florida A&M	W 64–49	7–17 (5–8)	Davey Whitney Complex (832); Lorman, MS
February 24, 2024; 1:00 p.m.		Jackson State	L 54–62	7–18 (5–9)	Davey Whitney Complex (968); Lorman, MS
March 2, 2024; 3:00 p.m.		at Prairie View A&M	W 55–53	8–18 (6–9)	William Nicks Building (675); Prairie View, TX
March 4, 2024; 5:30 p.m.		at Texas Southern	L 63–71	8–19 (6–10)	H&PE Arena (730); Houston, TX
March 7, 2024; 5:30 p.m.		Mississippi Valley State	W 63–48	9–19 (7–10)	Davey Whitney Complex (256); Lorman, MS
March 9, 2024; 1:00 p.m.		Arkansas–Pine Bluff	W 59–52	10–19 (8–10)	Davey Whitney Complex (452); Lorman, MS
SWAC tournament
March 14, 2024; 11:00 a.m., ESPN+	(6)	vs. (3) Southern; Quarterfinals	W 59–52	11–19	Bartow Arena (427); Birmingham, AL
March 15, 2024; 11:00 a.m., ESPN+	(6)	vs. (2) Grambling State; Semifinals	W 61–59	12–19	Bartow Arena (927); Birmingham, AL
March 16, 2024; 4:30 p.m., ESPNU/ESPN+	(6)	vs. (1) Jackson State; Championship	L 44–68	12–20	Bartow Arena (2,856); Birmingham, AL
*Non-conference game. ^{#}Rankings from AP poll. (#) Tournament seedings in parentheses. All times are in Central.
