= 2023–24 Prairie View A&M Lady Panthers basketball team =

American college basketball season

2023–24 Prairie View A&M Lady Panthers basketball
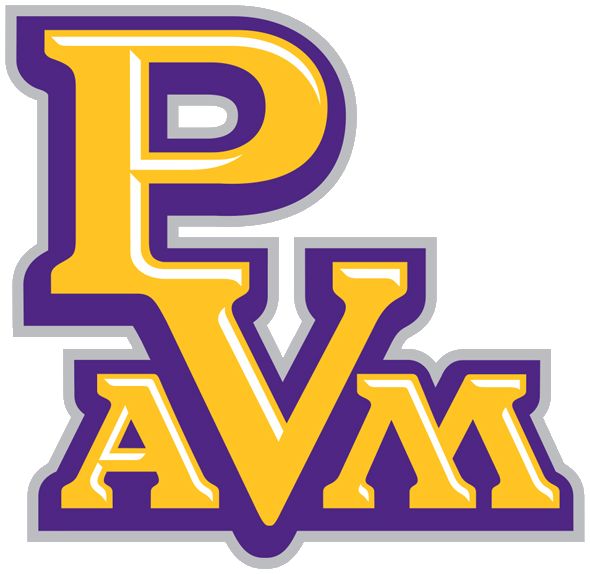
- Conference: Southwestern Athletic Conference
- Record: 11–18 (7–11 SWAC)
- Head coach: Sandy Pugh (6th season)
- Associate head coach: Danny Evans
- Assistant coaches: Rhonda Jackson; David Frank Jr.; Jeanette Jackson
- Home arena: William Nicks Building

2023–24 SWAC women's basketball standings
	Conf.				Overall
Team	W		L	PCT	W		L	PCT
Jackson State †	18	–	0	1.000	26	–	7	.788
Grambling State	15	–	3	.833	23	–	10	.697
Southern	13	–	5	.722	15	–	15	.500
Arkansas–Pine Bluff	11	–	7	.611	17	–	16	.515
Alabama A&M	10	–	8	.556	15	–	16	.484
Florida A&M	8	–	10	.444	9	–	21	.300
Alcorn State	8	–	10	.444	12	–	20	.375
Prairie View A&M	7	–	11	.389	11	–	18	.379
Texas Southern	6	–	12	.333	7	–	22	.241
Bethune–Cookman	6	–	12	.333	15	–	16	.484
Mississippi Valley State	3	–	15	.167	4	–	27	.129
Alabama State	3	–	15	.167	3	–	26	.103
† 2024 SWAC tournament winner

The 2023–24 Prairie View A&M Lady Panthers basketball team represented Prairie View A&M University during the 2023–24 NCAA Division I women's basketball season. The Lady Panthers, who were led by sixth-year head coach Sandy Pugh, played their home games at the William Nicks Building in Prairie View, Texas as members of the Southwestern Athletic Conference (SWAC).

== Previous season ==
The Lady Panthers finished the 2022–23 season 15–15, 12–6 in SWAC play, to finish in a four-way tie for second place. They were defeated by eventual tournament champions Southern in the quarterfinals of the SWAC tournament.

== Roster ==
2023–24 Prairie View A&M Panthers women's basketball team
Players
Coaches

Pos.	#	Name	Height	Year	Previous school	Hometown
G	0	Jada Roberson	5 ft 7 in (1.7 m)	GS	Austin Peay	Indianapolis, IN
G	2	Jayda Bowen	5 ft 7 in (1.7 m)	So	Crete-Monee High School	Crete, IL
G	3	Mikayla Hutchinson	5 ft 9 in (1.75 m)	RS Sr	Trinity Valley Community College	Mansfield, TX
G	4	Maya Williams	5 ft 5 in (1.65 m)	So	Illinois College	Cooper City, FL
G	7	Mia Monroe	5 ft 6 in (1.68 m)	Jr	North American	Colorado City, TX
G	10	Ryann Payne	5 ft 7 in (1.7 m)	GS	LSU	Los Angeles, CA
G/F	11	Jennifer Guibeaux	5 ft 9 in (1.75 m)	Sr	Kansas City Kansas Community College	Kansas City, KS
G/F	12	Kayla Smith	5 ft 11 in (1.8 m)	So	Winter Haven High School	Winter Haven, FL
F	14	LaFaedria Green	6 ft 2 in (1.88 m)	Jr	Trinity Valley Community College	Monroe, LA
F/C	20	Adreanna Waddle	6 ft 2 in (1.88 m)	Jr	Weatherford College	Fort Worth, TX
F	21	Gerlyn Smith	6 ft 1 in (1.85 m)	Sr	Tyler Junior College	Miramar, FL
G/F	30	Jaliyah Harper	5 ft 11 in (1.8 m)	Jr	Lancaster High School	Lancaster, TX
F	31	Jessica Soders	5 ft 11 in (1.8 m)	Sr	Blinn College	Houston, TX
F	32	Desiree Lewis	5 ft 11 in (1.8 m)	GS	Tulsa	Converse, TX
C	44	Amauri Williams	6 ft 4 in (1.93 m)	So	Vanderbilt	Little Rock, AR

Head coach

- Kia Damon-Olson (Northwestern State)

Assistant coach(es)

- Danny Evans (Oregon State)
- Rhonda Jackson (Arkansas)
- David Frank Jr. (Prairie View A&M)
- Jeanette Jackson (Prairie View A&M)

Legend

- (C) Team captain
- (S) Suspended
- (I) Ineligible
- (W) Walk-on
- Injured
- Current redshirt

Roster
Last update: May 24, 2024

== Schedule and results ==
Date time, TV	Rank^{#}	Opponent^{#}	Result	Record	Site (attendance) city, state
Non-conference regular season
November 9, 2023*; 5:30 p.m.		Huston–Tillotson	W 102–62	1–0	William Nicks Building (234); Prairie View, TX
November 12, 2023*; 3:00 p.m.		at McNeese	W 85–70	2–0	The Legacy Center (1,695); Lake Charles, LA
November 14, 2023*; 6:00 p.m., ESPN+		at Tulane	L 46–71	2–1	Devlin Fieldhouse (588); New Orleans, LA
November 16, 2023*; 6:00 p.m.		North American	W 101–44	3–1	William Nicks Building (324); Prairie View, TX
November 19, 2023*; 8:00 p.m., ESPN+		No. 24 Washington State	L 43–81	3–2	William Nicks Building (426); Prairie View, TX
November 27, 2023*; 5:30 p.m.		Incarnate Word	L 44–57	3–3	William Nicks Building (246); Prairie View, TX
December 10, 2023*; 2:00 p.m., ESPN+		at TCU	L 41–85	3–4	Schollmaier Arena (–); Fort Worth, TX
December 16, 2023*; 2:00 p.m., ESPN+		at Rice	L 59–85	3–5	Tudor Fieldhouse (765); Houston, TX
December 20, 2023*; 1:00 p.m., SECN+		at Texas A&M	L 36–88	3–6	Reed Arena (1,203); College Station, TX
December 30, 2023*; 3:00 p.m.		Wiley	W 107–32	4–6	William Nicks Building (170); Prairie View, TX
SWAC regular season
January 6, 2024; 2:00 p.m.		at Grambling State	L 54–82	4–7 (0–1)	Fredrick C. Hobdy Assembly Center (–); Grambling, LA
January 8, 2024; 5:30 p.m.		at Southern	L 56–84	4–8 (0–2)	F. G. Clark Center (1,259); Baton Rouge, LA
January 13, 2024; 3:00 p.m.		Mississippi Valley State	W 83–69	5–8 (1–2)	William Nicks Building (–); Prairie View, TX
January 15, 2024; 1:00 p.m.		Arkansas–Pine Bluff	Postponed		William Nicks Building; Prairie View, TX
January 20, 2024; 3:00 p.m.		at Jackson State	L 54–91	5–9 (1–3)	Williams Assembly Center (1,795); Jackson, MS
January 22, 2024; 5:00 p.m.		at Alcorn State	W 61–55	6–9 (2–3)	Davey Whitney Complex (1,252); Lorman, MS
January 27, 2024; 3:00 p.m.		Alabama State	W 46–43	7–9 (3–3)	William Nicks Building (595); Prairie View, TX
January 29, 2024; 5:30 p.m.		Alabama A&M	W 65–59	8–9 (4–3)	William Nicks Building (789); Prairie View, TX
February 3, 2024; 3:00 p.m.		Texas Southern	W 78–65	9–9 (5–3)	William Nicks Building (1,406); Prairie View, TX
February 5, 2024; 5:30 p.m.		Arkansas–Pine Bluff; Rescheduled from January 15	L 48–77	9–10 (5–4)	William Nicks Building (407); Prairie View, TX
February 10, 2024; 2:00 p.m.		at Bethune–Cookman	L 61–74	9–11 (5–5)	Moore Gymnasium (608); Daytona Beach, FL
February 12, 2024; 5:30 p.m.		at Florida A&M	L 63–71	9–12 (5–6)	Al Lawson Center (241); Tallahassee, FL
February 17, 2024; 3:00 p.m.		Southern	L 68–75 ^{OT}	9–13 (5–7)	William Nicks Building (405); Prairie View, TX
February 19, 2024; 5:30 p.m.		Grambling State	L 55–64	9–14 (5–8)	William Nicks Building (513); Prairie View, TX
February 24, 2024; 3:00 p.m.		at Arkansas–Pine Bluff	W 66–57	10–14 (6–8)	H.O. Clemmons Arena (–); Pine Bluff, AR
February 26, 2024; 5:30 p.m.		at Mississippi Valley State	W 69–63	11–14 (7–8)	Harrison HPER Complex (1,258); Itta Bena, MS
March 2, 2024; 3:00 p.m.		Alcorn State	L 53–55	11–15 (7–9)	William Nicks Building (675); Prairie View, TX
March 4, 2024; 5:30 p.m.		Jackson State	L 65–75	11–16 (7–10)	William Nicks Building (550); Prairie View, TX
March 9, 2024; 3:00 p.m.		at Texas Southern	L 70–83	11–17 (7–11)	H&PE Arena (3,612); Houston, TX
SWAC tournament
March 13, 2024; 5:30 p.m., ESPN+	(8)	vs. (1) Jackson State; Quarterfinals	L 58–67	11–18	Bartow Arena (1,024); Birmingham, AL
*Non-conference game. ^{#}Rankings from AP poll. (#) Tournament seedings in parentheses. All times are in Central.
