= 2023–24 Southern Lady Jaguars basketball team =

American college basketball season

2023–24 Southern Lady Jaguars basketball
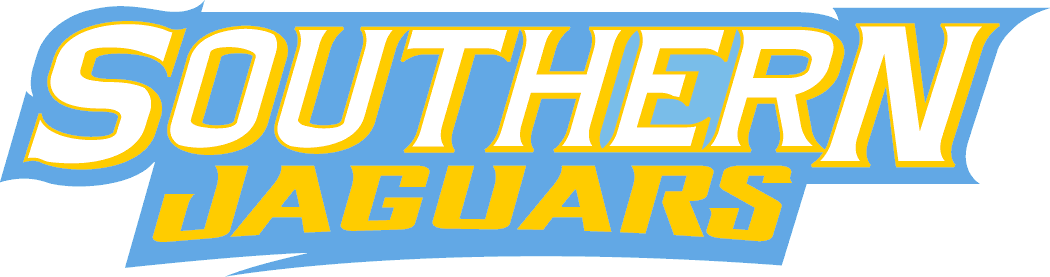
- Conference: Southwestern Athletic Conference
- Record: 15–15 (13–5 SWAC)
- Head coach: Carlos Funchess (6th season)
- Assistant coaches: Jeremy Bonin; Patrece Carter; Courtney Parson; TJ Pugh
- Home arena: F. G. Clark Center

2023–24 SWAC women's basketball standings
	Conf.				Overall
Team	W		L	PCT	W		L	PCT
Jackson State †	18	–	0	1.000	26	–	7	.788
Grambling State	15	–	3	.833	23	–	10	.697
Southern	13	–	5	.722	15	–	15	.500
Arkansas–Pine Bluff	11	–	7	.611	17	–	16	.515
Alabama A&M	10	–	8	.556	15	–	16	.484
Florida A&M	8	–	10	.444	9	–	21	.300
Alcorn State	8	–	10	.444	12	–	20	.375
Prairie View A&M	7	–	11	.389	11	–	18	.379
Texas Southern	6	–	12	.333	7	–	22	.241
Bethune–Cookman	6	–	12	.333	15	–	16	.484
Mississippi Valley State	3	–	15	.167	4	–	27	.129
Alabama State	3	–	15	.167	3	–	26	.103
† 2024 SWAC tournament winner

The 2023–24 Southern Lady Jaguars basketball team represented Southern University during the 2023–24 NCAA Division I women's basketball season. The Lady Jaguars, who were led by sixth-year head coach Carlos Funchess, played their home games at the F. G. Clark Center in Baton Rouge, Louisiana as members of the Southwestern Athletic Conference (SWAC).

The Lady Jaguars finished the season 15–15, 13–5 in SWAC play, to finish in third place. They were upset by #6 seed Alcorn State in the quarterfinals of the SWAC tournament.

== Previous season ==
The Lady Jaguars finished the 2022–23 season 18–15, 12–6 in SWAC play, to finish in a four-way tie for second place. They defeated Prairie View A&M, Jackson State and Arkansas–Pine Bluff to win the SWAC tournament championship and earn the conference's automatic bid into the NCAA tournament, and their first tournament appearance since 2019. They received the #16 seed in the Seattle Regional 4, where they would lose to Sacred Heart in the First Four.

== Roster ==
2023–24 Southern Lady Jaguars women's basketball team
Players
Coaches

Pos.	#	Name	Height	Year	Previous school	Hometown
G	1	Aniya Gourdine	5 ft 9 in (1.75 m)	Jr	Temple	Baltimore, MD
G	2	Aleighyah Fontenot	5 ft 9 in (1.75 m)	Jr	Ridge Point High School	Fresno, TX
G	3	Taylor Williams	5 ft 8 in (1.73 m)	GS	Bethune–Cookman	Rahway, NJ
G	4	Chloe Fleming	5 ft 6 in (1.68 m)	GS	South Terrebonne High School	Bourg, LA
G	5	Ra'von Robertson	5 ft 9 in (1.75 m)	Sr	Assumption High School	Plattenville, LA
G	11	Cayla Obillo	5 ft 2 in (1.57 m)	GS	Alcorn State	Pass Christian, MS
G	14	Soniyah Reed	6 ft 0 in (1.83 m)	Jr	Northshore High School	Slidell, LA
F	15	Sky Castro	6 ft 2 in (1.88 m)	Sr	Saint Peter's	Queens, NY
C	21	Tionna Lidge	6 ft 4 in (1.93 m)	Jr	Andress High School	El Paso, TX
G	22	Sirviva Legions	5 ft 7 in (1.7 m)	So	Mansfield Legacy High School	Brooklyn, NY
G	23	Osha Cummings	5 ft 6 in (1.68 m)	Sr	Northwestern State	Zachary, LA
G	24	Kyanna Morgan	5 ft 10 in (1.78 m)	Sr	Radford	Charlotte, NC
G	25	Genovea Johnson	5 ft 8 in (1.73 m)	GS	Dillard High School	Fort Lauderdale, FL
C	32	Xyllize Harrison	6 ft 4 in (1.93 m)	Jr	Garland High School	Garland, TX
F	44	Raven White	6 ft 1 in (1.85 m)	Sr	Dillard High School	Fort Lauderdale, FL

Head coach

- Carlos Funchess (Louisiana–Monroe)

Assistant coach(es)

- Jeremy Bonin
- Patrece Carter (Louisiana Christian)
- Courtney Parson (Southern)
- TJ Pugh (LSU)

Legend

- (C) Team captain
- (S) Suspended
- (I) Ineligible
- (W) Walk-on
- Injured
- Current redshirt

Roster
Last update: April 19, 2024

== Schedule and results ==
Date time, TV	Rank^{#}	Opponent^{#}	Result	Record	Site (attendance) city, state
Non-conference regular season
November 6, 2023*; 7:00 p.m., ESPN+		at No. 19 Baylor	L 53–85	0–1	Ferrell Center (3,570); Waco, TX
November 8, 2023*; 7:00 p.m., LHN		at No. 13 Texas	L 35–80	0–2	Moody Center (5,106); Austin, TX
November 12, 2023*; 2:00 p.m., B1G+		at Purdue	L 50–67	0–3	Mackey Arena (5,002); West Lafayette, IN
November 17, 2023*; 4:00 p.m., ACCNX		at Miami (FL)	L 57–61	0–4	Watsco Center (2,188); Coral Gables, FL
November 20, 2023*; 6:30 p.m., ESPN+		at Iowa State	L 60–78	0–5	Hilton Coliseum (8,776); Ames, IA
December 3, 2023*; 3:00 p.m., JSN		Northwestern State	L 35–46	0–6	F. G. Clark Center (551); Baton Rouge, LA
December 9, 2023*; 3:00 p.m.		Louisiana Christian	W 101–45	1–6	F. G. Clark Center (659); Baton Rouge, LA
December 11, 2023*; 9:00 p.m., P12N		at Oregon; Pac-12/SWAC Legacy Series	L 37–67	1–7	Matthew Knight Arena (5,307); Eugene, OR
December 17, 2023*; 12:00 p.m., B1G+		at Nebraska	L 51–76	1–8	Pinnacle Bank Arena (4,488); Lincoln, NE
December 20, 2023*; 6:30 p.m., ESPN+		at No. 12 Kansas State	L 52–84	1–9	Bramlage Coliseum (3,191); Manhattan, KS
December 22, 2023*; 12:00 p.m., ESPN+		at Oklahoma	W 79–70	2–9	Lloyd Noble Center (3,731); Norman, OK
SWAC regular season
January 6, 2024; 3:00 p.m.		Texas Southern	W 64–45	3–9 (1–0)	F. G. Clark Center (1,859); Baton Rouge, LA
January 8, 2024; 4:30 p.m., JSN		Prairie View A&M	W 84–56	4–9 (2–0)	F. G. Clark Center (1,259); Baton Rouge, LA
January 13, 2024; 1:00 p.m.		at Florida A&M	L 53–59	4–10 (2–1)	Al Lawson Center (1,087); Tallahassee, FL
January 15, 2024; 4:30 p.m.		at Bethune–Cookman	W 71–66	5–10 (3–1)	Moore Gymnasium (622); Daytona Beach, FL
January 20, 2024; 12:00 p.m.		at Grambling State	L 45–69	5–11 (3–2)	Fredrick C. Hobdy Assembly Center (–); Grambling, LA
January 27, 2024; 3:00 p.m., JSN		Arkansas–Pine Bluff	L 59–74	5–12 (3–3)	F. G. Clark Center (3,764); Baton Rouge, LA
January 29, 2024; 5:30 p.m., JSN		Mississippi Valley State	W 64–45	6–12 (4–3)	F. G. Clark Center (1,586); Baton Rouge, LA
February 3, 2024; 1:00 p.m.		at Alcorn State	W 61–58	7–12 (5–3)	Davey Whitney Complex (820); Lorman, MS
February 5, 2024; 5:30 p.m.		at Jackson State	L 58–63	7–13 (5–4)	Williams Assembly Center (2,655); Jackson, MS
February 10, 2024; 3:00 p.m., JSN		Alabama A&M	W 67–60	8–13 (6–4)	F. G. Clark Center (1,929); Baton Rouge, LA
February 12, 2024; 3:00 p.m., JSN		Alabama State	W 79–63	9–13 (7–4)	F. G. Clark Center (1,528); Baton Rouge, LA
February 17, 2024; 3:00 p.m.		at Prairie View A&M	W 75–68 ^{OT}	10–13 (8–4)	William Nicks Building (405); Prairie View, TX
February 19, 2024; 5:30 p.m.		at Texas Southern	W 68–52	11–13 (9–4)	H&PE Arena (1,247); Houston, TX
February 24, 2024; 3:00 p.m., JSN		Grambling State	L 57–59	11–14 (9–5)	F. G. Clark Center (4,689); Baton Rouge, LA
March 2, 2024; 12:00 p.m.		Bethune–Cookman	W 65–59 ^{OT}	12–14 (10–5)	F. G. Clark Center (3,589); Baton Rouge, LA
March 4, 2024; 5:30 p.m., JSN		Florida A&M	W 67–61	13–14 (11–5)	F. G. Clark Center (3,853); Baton Rouge, LA
March 7, 2024; 5:30 p.m.		at Alabama State	W 61–49	14–14 (12–5)	Dunn–Oliver Acadome (2,100); Montgomery, AL
March 9, 2024; 2:00 p.m.		at Alabama A&M	W 59–50	15–14 (13–5)	Alabama A&M Events Center (711); Huntsville, AL
SWAC tournament
March 14, 2024; 11:00 a.m., ESPN+	(3)	vs. (6) Alcorn State; Quarterfinals	L 52–59	15–15	Bartow Arena (427); Birmingham, AL
*Non-conference game. ^{#}Rankings from AP poll. (#) Tournament seedings in parentheses. All times are in Central.
