= 2023–24 Bethune–Cookman Wildcats women's basketball team =

American college basketball season

2023–24 Bethune–Cookman Wildcats women's basketball
- Conference: Southwestern Athletic Conference
- Record: 15–16 (6–12 SWAC)
- Head coach: Janell Crayton (3rd season)
- Assistant coaches: Sherrie Tucker; Britney Snowden; Stephan Walton
- Home arena: Moore Gymnasium

2023–24 SWAC women's basketball standings
	Conf.				Overall
Team	W		L	PCT	W		L	PCT
Jackson State †	18	–	0	1.000	26	–	7	.788
Grambling State	15	–	3	.833	23	–	10	.697
Southern	13	–	5	.722	15	–	15	.500
Arkansas–Pine Bluff	11	–	7	.611	17	–	16	.515
Alabama A&M	10	–	8	.556	15	–	16	.484
Florida A&M	8	–	10	.444	9	–	21	.300
Alcorn State	8	–	10	.444	12	–	20	.375
Prairie View A&M	7	–	11	.389	11	–	18	.379
Texas Southern	6	–	12	.333	7	–	22	.241
Bethune–Cookman	6	–	12	.333	15	–	16	.484
Mississippi Valley State	3	–	15	.167	4	–	27	.129
Alabama State	3	–	15	.167	3	–	26	.103
† 2024 SWAC tournament winner

The 2023–24 Bethune–Cookman Wildcats women's basketball team represented Bethune–Cookman University during the 2023–24 NCAA Division I women's basketball season. The Wildcats, who were led by third-year head coach Janell Crayton, played their home games at Moore Gymnasium in Daytona Beach, Florida as members of the Southwestern Athletic Conference (SWAC).

== Previous season ==
The Wildcats finished the 2022–23 season 11–18, 10–8 in SWAC play, to finish in a tie for sixth place. They were defeated by Alabama State in the quarterfinals of the SWAC tournament.

== Roster ==
2023–24 Bethune–Cookman Wildcats women's basketball team
Players
Coaches

Pos.	#	Name	Height	Year	Previous school	Hometown
G	1	D'Shantae Edwards	5 ft 7 in (1.7 m)	So	Dallastown Area High School	Dallastown, PA
F	2	Kayla White	5 ft 6 in (1.68 m)	Jr	Brush High School	Cleveland, OH
G	3	Karianna Woods	5 ft 7 in (1.7 m)	So	Arbor Prep High School	Ann Arbor, MI
G	4	Chariot Johnson	5 ft 9 in (1.75 m)	Fr	Booker High School	Sarasota, FL
G	10	O'Mariyah Tucker	5 ft 11 in (1.8 m)	Sr	Georgia Highlands	Ocala, FL
F	12	Chanelle McDonald	6 ft 2 in (1.88 m)	Jr	Warner	Lake Wales, FL
F	15	Gabriela Stevens	5 ft 11 in (1.8 m)	Fr	Davison High School	Flint, MI
F	20	Nia Jordan	6 ft 1 in (1.85 m)	Sr	Buffalo	Philadelphia, PA
G	21	Kerrighan Dunn	5 ft 9 in (1.75 m)	Jr	Kilgore College	Texarkana, TX
G	22	Chanel Wilson	5 ft 7 in (1.7 m)	GS	Indiana	Powder Springs, GA
G	23	Daimoni Dorsey	5 ft 7 in (1.7 m)	So	Saint Frances Academy	Baltimore, MD
F	24	Camerah Langston	5 ft 11 in (1.8 m)	So	Westlake High School	Chicago, IL
C	25	Kayla Clark	6 ft 3 in (1.91 m)	Jr	Miami Central Senior High School	Miami, FL

Head coach

- Janell Crayton (Davidson)

Assistant coach(es)

- Sherrie Tucker (Coppin State)
- Brittany Snowden (East Tennessee State)
- Stephan Walton (Manitoba)

Legend

- (C) Team captain
- (S) Suspended
- (I) Ineligible
- (W) Walk-on
- Injured
- Current redshirt

Roster
Last update: May 28, 2024

== Schedule and results ==
Date time, TV	Rank^{#}	Opponent^{#}	Result	Record	Site (attendance) city, state
Non-conference regular season
November 6, 2023*; 6:00 p.m., ESPN+		at UCF	L 63–101	0–1	Addition Financial Arena (3,225); Orlando, FL
November 9, 2023*; 6:00 p.m., SECN+		at Florida	L 69–83	0–2	O'Connell Center (943); Gainesville, FL
November 15, 2023*; 5:30 p.m., CatEye Network		Iona	W 74–72 ^{OT}	1–2	Moore Gymnasium (555); Daytona Beach, FL
November 22, 2023*; 12:00 p.m., ESPN+		at Georgia State; Georgia State Classic	W 56–48	2–2	GSU Convocation Center (839); Atlanta, GA
November 23, 2023*; 2:30 p.m.		vs. Bradley; Georgia State Classic	W 64–57	3–2	GSU Convocation Center (771); Atlanta, GA
November 28, 2023*; 6:00 p.m., CatEye Network		Jacksonville	W 68–63	4–2	Moore Gymnasium (454); Daytona Beach, FL
December 3, 2023*; 1:00 p.m., ESPN+		at FIU	L 51–54	4–3	Ocean Bank Convocation Center (318); Miami, FL
December 9, 2023*; 2:00 p.m., CatEye Network		Warner	W 85–47	5–3	Moore Gymnasium (206); Daytona Beach, FL
December 12, 2023*; 11:00 a.m., CatEye Network		Johnson (FL)	W 96–24	6–3	Moore Gymnasium (412); Daytona Beach, FL
December 15, 2023*; 6:00 p.m., CatEye Network		Trinity Baptist	W 114–37	7–3	Moore Gymnasium (103); Daytona Beach, FL
December 19, 2023*; 1:00 p.m.		vs. Valparaiso; Hatter Classic	W 61–35	8–3	Edmunds Center (162); DeLand, FL
December 20, 2023*; 1:00 p.m.		vs. North Carolina A&T; Hatter Classic	L 47–66	8–4	Edmunds Center (–); DeLand, FL
December 30, 2023*; 2:00 p.m., ESPN+		at Mercer	W 60–58	9–4	Hawkins Arena (253); Macon, GA
SWAC regular season
January 6, 2024; 2:00 p.m., CatEye Network		Florida A&M	W 80–76	10–4 (1–0)	Moore Gymnasium (981); Daytona Beach, FL
January 13, 2024; 2:00 p.m., CatEye Network		Grambling State	L 62–63	10–5 (1–1)	Moore Gymnasium (776); Daytona Beach, FL
January 15, 2024; 5:30 p.m., CatEye Network		Southern	L 66–71	10–6 (1–2)	Moore Gymnasium (622); Daytona Beach, FL
January 20, 2024; 5:00 p.m.		at Mississippi Valley State	W 76–57	11–6 (2–2)	Harrison HPER Complex (2,012); Itta Bena, MS
January 22, 2024; 6:30 p.m.		at Arkansas–Pine Bluff	W 73–70	12–6 (3–2)	H.O. Clemmons Arena (1,346); Pine Bluff, AR
January 27, 2024; 2:00 p.m., CatEye Network		Jackson State	L 65–81	12–7 (3–3)	Moore Gymnasium (509); Daytona Beach, FL
January 29, 2024; 5:00 p.m., CatEye Network		Alcorn State	W 66–58	13–7 (4–3)	Moore Gymnasium (443); Daytona Beach, FL
February 3, 2024; 1:00 p.m., HBCU GO		at Alabama State	L 53–56	13–8 (4–4)	Dunn–Oliver Acadome (3,200); Montgomery, AL
February 5, 2024; 6:30 p.m.		at Alabama A&M	L 72–76 ^{OT}	13–9 (4–5)	Alabama A&M Events Center (1,361); Huntsville, AL
February 10, 2024; 2:00 p.m., CatEye Network		Prairie View A&M	W 74–61	14–9 (5–5)	Moore Gymnasium (608); Daytona Beach, FL
February 12, 2024; 5:30 p.m., CatEye Network		Texas Southern	L 64–65	14–10 (5–6)	Moore Gymnasium (401); Daytona Beach, FL
February 17, 2024; 2:00 p.m.		at Alcorn State	L 40–51	14–11 (5–7)	Davey Whitney Complex (752); Lorman, MS
February 19, 2024; 6:30 p.m.		at Jackson State	L 39–52	14–12 (5–8)	Williams Assembly Center (–); Jackson, MS
February 24, 2024; 2:00 p.m., CatEye Network		Alabama A&M	L 58–63	14–13 (5–9)	Moore Gymnasium (441); Daytona Beach, FL
February 26, 2024; 5:30 p.m., CatEye Network		Alabama State	W 84–43	15–13 (6–9)	Moore Gymnasium (439); Daytona Beach, FL
March 2, 2024; 1:00 p.m., HBCU GO		at Southern	L 59–65 ^{OT}	15–14 (6–10)	F. G. Clark Center (3,589); Baton Rouge, LA
March 4, 2024; 6:30 p.m.		at Grambling State	L 54–64	15–15 (6–11)	Fredrick C. Hobdy Assembly Center (979); Grambling, LA
March 9, 2024; 2:00 p.m.		at Florida A&M	L 65–69	15–16 (6–12)	Al Lawson Center (998); Tallahassee, FL
*Non-conference game. ^{#}Rankings from AP poll. (#) Tournament seedings in parentheses. All times are in Eastern.
