= 2023–24 Arkansas–Pine Bluff Golden Lions women's basketball team =

American college basketball season

2023–24 Arkansas–Pine Bluff Golden Lions women's basketball
- Conference: Southwestern Athletic Conference
- Record: 17–16 (11–7 SWAC)
- Head coach: Dawn Thornton (5th season)
- Assistant coaches: Nicole Mealing; Briona Brown; Nathaniel Bell
- Home arena: H.O. Clemmons Arena

2023–24 SWAC women's basketball standings
	Conf.				Overall
Team	W		L	PCT	W		L	PCT
Jackson State †	18	–	0	1.000	26	–	7	.788
Grambling State	15	–	3	.833	23	–	10	.697
Southern	13	–	5	.722	15	–	15	.500
Arkansas–Pine Bluff	11	–	7	.611	17	–	16	.515
Alabama A&M	10	–	8	.556	15	–	16	.484
Florida A&M	8	–	10	.444	9	–	21	.300
Alcorn State	8	–	10	.444	12	–	20	.375
Prairie View A&M	7	–	11	.389	11	–	18	.379
Texas Southern	6	–	12	.333	7	–	22	.241
Bethune–Cookman	6	–	12	.333	15	–	16	.484
Mississippi Valley State	3	–	15	.167	4	–	27	.129
Alabama State	3	–	15	.167	3	–	26	.103
† 2024 SWAC tournament winner

The 2023–24 Arkansas–Pine Bluff Golden Lions women's basketball team represented the University of Arkansas at Pine Bluff during the 2023–24 NCAA Division I women's basketball season. The Golden Lions, who were led by fifth-year head coach Dawn Thornton, played their home games at the H.O. Clemmons Arena in Pine Bluff, Arkansas as members of the Southwestern Athletic Conference (SWAC).

== Previous season ==
The Golden Lions finished the 2022–23 season 14–17, 10–8 in SWAC play, to finish in a tie for sixth place. They upset #2 seed Alabama A&M and #3 seed Alabama State, before falling to Southern in the SWAC tournament championship game.

== Roster ==
2023–24 Arkansas–Pine Bluff Golden Lions women's basketball team
Players
Coaches

Pos.	#	Name	Height	Year	Previous school	Hometown
G	00	Zaay Green	6 ft 2 in (1.88 m)	GS	Texas A&M	Duncanville, TX
G	2	Shayla Bouie	5 ft 7 in (1.7 m)	Sr	Daytona State College	Jacksonville, FL
G	4	Kourtney Rittenberry	6 ft 1 in (1.85 m)	Jr	Grayson High School	Loganville, GA
F	7	Starr Jacobs	6 ft 2 in (1.88 m)	Sr	UT Arlington	Dallas, TX
G	11	Tia Morgan	5 ft 8 in (1.73 m)	Sr	Tyler Junior College	Chicago, IL
G	12	Empress Roberts	5 ft 7 in (1.7 m)	So	Harker Heights High School	Harker Heights, TX
G	13	Uriah Jennings	5 ft 8 in (1.73 m)	Fr	Cleveland Heights High School	Mayfield Heights, OH
F	14	Azaria Robinson	6 ft 2 in (1.88 m)	Sr	Little Rock	Anchorage, AK
G	15	Coriah Beck	5 ft 11 in (1.8 m)	Sr	Memphis	Memphis, TN
C	23	Maori Davenport	6 ft 5 in (1.96 m)	Sr	Georgia	Troy, AL
G	25	Kalia Walker	5 ft 5 in (1.65 m)	Sr	Bryant High School	Alexander, AR
F	32	Stephanie Okowi	6 ft 0 in (1.83 m)	RS Jr	Oakland Tech High School	Oakland, CA
F	35	Crystianna Whitehead	5 ft 11 in (1.8 m)	Fr	Memphis Business Academy	Cordova, TN
C	54	Maya Peat	6 ft 6 in (1.98 m)	Sr	Chandler High School	Chandler, AZ

Head coach

- Dawn Thornton (Jackson State)

Assistant coach(es)

- Nicole Mealing (Francis Marion)
- Briona Brown (Jacksonville)
- Nathaniel Bell (Texas Southern)

Legend

- (C) Team captain
- (S) Suspended
- (I) Ineligible
- (W) Walk-on
- Injured
- Current redshirt

Roster
Last update: April 22, 2024

== Schedule and results ==
Date time, TV	Rank^{#}	Opponent^{#}	Result	Record	Site (attendance) city, state
Non-conference regular season
November 6, 2023*; 7:30 p.m.		at Oregon State	L 74–85	0–1	Gill Coliseum (3,305); Corvallis, OR
November 8, 2023*; 8:00 p.m.		at Oregon	L 60–86	0–2	Matthew Knight Arena (5,020); Eugene, OR
November 18, 2023*; 5:00 p.m.		Texas A&M–Texarkana	W 118–51	1–2	H.O. Clemmons Arena (658); Pine Bluff, AR
November 24, 2023*; 3:45 p.m., ESPN+		vs. Tulsa; Van Chancellor Classic	L 79–90	1–3	Merrell Center (324); Katy, TX
November 25, 2023*; 3:45 p.m., ESPN+		vs. No. 25 Mississippi State; Van Chancellor Classic	L 68–77	1–4	Merrell Center (545); Katy, TX
November 26, 2023*; 3:15 p.m., ESPN+		vs. Clemson; Van Chancellor Classic	L 66–92	1–5	Merrell Center (217); Katy, TX
November 28, 2023*; 5:00 p.m., ESPN+		at Arkansas State	L 65–85	1–6	First National Bank Arena (2,229); Jonesboro, AR
December 1, 2023*; 11:00 a.m.		Arkansas Baptist	W 103–35	2–6	H.O. Clemmons Arena (1,462); Pine Bluff, AR
December 4, 2023*; 7:00 p.m., ESPN+		at SMU	W 78–76	3–6	Moody Coliseum (969); University Park, TX
December 6, 2023*; 11:00 a.m., ESPN+		at North Texas	L 66–73	3–7	The Super Pit (2,319); Denton, TX
December 10, 2023*; 1:00 p.m., SECN		at Arkansas	W 74–70	4–7	Bud Walton Arena (3,330); Fayetteville, AR
December 21, 2023*; 1:00 p.m.		Ole Miss	L 47–62	4–8	H.O. Clemmons Arena (2,246); Pine Bluff, AR
December 31, 2023*; 1:00 p.m.		at McNeese	W 103–87	5–8	The Legacy Center (1,693); Lake Charles, LA
SWAC regular season
January 6, 2024; 3:00 p.m.		Alabama A&M	W 75–67	6–8 (1–0)	H.O. Clemmons Arena (1,145); Pine Bluff, AR
January 8, 2024; 5:30 p.m.		Alabama State	W 85–52	7–8 (2–0)	H.O. Clemmons Arena (1,103); Pine Bluff, AR
January 13, 2024; 3:00 p.m.		at Texas Southern	L 80–85	7–9 (2–1)	H&PE Arena (346); Houston, TX
January 15, 2024; 1:00 p.m.		at Prairie View A&M	Postponed		William Nicks Building; Prairie View, TX
January 20, 2024; 1:00 p.m.		Florida A&M	W 85–62	8–9 (3–1)	H.O. Clemmons Arena (1,281); Pine Bluff, AR
January 22, 2024; 5:30 p.m.		Bethune–Cookman	L 70–73	8–10 (3–2)	H.O. Clemmons Arena (1,346); Pine Bluff, AR
January 27, 2024; 3:00 p.m.		at Southern	W 74–59	9–10 (4–2)	F. G. Clark Center (3,764); Baton Rouge, LA
January 29, 2024; 5:30 p.m.		at Grambling State	W 56–49	10–10 (5–2)	Fredrick C. Hobdy Assembly Center (1,133); Grambling, LA
February 3, 2024; 4:00 p.m.		at Mississippi Valley State	W 76–60	11–10 (6–2)	Harrison HPER Complex (1,409); Itta Bena, MS
February 5, 2024; 5:30 p.m.		at Prairie View A&M; Rescheduled from January 15	W 77–48	12–10 (7–2)	William Nicks Building (407); Prairie View, TX
February 10, 2024; 12:05 p.m.		Alcorn State	W 80–57	13–10 (8–2)	H.O. Clemmons Arena (2,306); Pine Bluff, AR
February 12, 2024; 5:30 p.m.		Jackson State	L 56–72	13–11 (8–3)	H.O. Clemmons Arena (–); Pine Bluff, AR
February 17, 2024; 2:00 p.m.		at Alabama State	W 70–47	14–11 (9–3)	Dunn–Oliver Acadome (3,506); Montgomery, AL
February 19, 2024; 5:00 p.m.		at Alabama A&M	L 59–67	14–12 (9–4)	Alabama A&M Events Center (941); Huntsville, AL
February 24, 2024; 3:00 p.m.		Prairie View A&M	L 57–66	14–13 (9–5)	H.O. Clemmons Arena (–); Pine Bluff, AR
February 26, 2024; 5:30 p.m.		Texas Southern	W 81–62	15–13 (10–5)	H.O. Clemmons Arena (768); Pine Bluff, AR
March 2, 2024; 3:00 p.m.		Mississippi Valley State	W 78–57	16–13 (11–5)	H.O. Clemmons Arena (2,143); Pine Bluff, AR
March 7, 2024; 5:30 p.m.		at Jackson State	L 67–82	16–14 (11–6)	Williams Assembly Center (1,752); Jackson, MS
March 9, 2024; 1:00 p.m.		at Alcorn State	L 52–59	16–15 (11–7)	Davey Whitney Complex (452); Lorman, MS
SWAC tournament
March 14, 2024; 5:30 p.m., ESPN+	(4)	vs. (5) Alabama A&M; Quarterfinals	W 82–74	17–15	Bartow Arena (827); Birmingham, AL
March 15, 2024; 5:30 p.m., ESPN+	(4)	vs. (1) Jackson State; Semifinals	L 48–70	17–16	Bartow Arena (1,072); Birmingham, AL
*Non-conference game. ^{#}Rankings from AP poll. (#) Tournament seedings in parentheses. All times are in Central.
