= 2023–24 Mississippi Valley State Devilettes basketball team =

American college basketball season

2023–24 Mississippi Valley State Devilettes basketball
- Conference: Southwestern Athletic Conference
- Record: 4–27 (3–15 SWAC)
- Head coach: Kimberly Anderson (2nd season)
- Associate head coach: Jason James
- Assistant coaches: Ashley Shields; Felton Young
- Home arena: Harrison HPER Complex

2023–24 SWAC women's basketball standings
	Conf.				Overall
Team	W		L	PCT	W		L	PCT
Jackson State †	18	–	0	1.000	26	–	7	.788
Grambling State	15	–	3	.833	23	–	10	.697
Southern	13	–	5	.722	15	–	15	.500
Arkansas–Pine Bluff	11	–	7	.611	17	–	16	.515
Alabama A&M	10	–	8	.556	15	–	16	.484
Florida A&M	8	–	10	.444	9	–	21	.300
Alcorn State	8	–	10	.444	12	–	20	.375
Prairie View A&M	7	–	11	.389	11	–	18	.379
Texas Southern	6	–	12	.333	7	–	22	.241
Bethune–Cookman	6	–	12	.333	15	–	16	.484
Mississippi Valley State	3	–	15	.167	4	–	27	.129
Alabama State	3	–	15	.167	3	–	26	.103
† 2024 SWAC tournament winner

The 2023–24 Mississippi Valley State Devilettes basketball team represented Mississippi Valley State University during the 2023–24 NCAA Division I women's basketball season. The Devilettes, who were led by second-year head coach Kimberly Anderson, played their home games at the Harrison HPER Complex in Itta Bena, Mississippi as members of the Southwestern Athletic Conference (SWAC). They finished the season 4–27, 3–15 in SWAC play, to finish in a tie for 11th (last) place.

== Previous season ==
The Devilettes finished the 2022–23 season 2–27, 0–18 in SWAC play, to finish in 12th (last) place. Since only the top eight teams qualify for the SWAC tournament, the Devilettes failed to qualify.

== Roster ==
2023–24 Mississippi Valley State Devilettes women's basketball team
Players
Coaches

Pos.	#	Name	Height	Year	Previous school	Hometown
F	0	Sadie Williams	5 ft 9 in (1.75 m)	Jr	East Mississippi CC	Pontiac, MI
G	1	Sh'Diamond McKnight	5 ft 7 in (1.7 m)	Jr	Southern Arkansas Tech	Bossier City, LA
G	2	Jaylia Reed	5 ft 6 in (1.68 m)	Jr	Southern Arkansas Tech	Hot Springs, AR
F	3	Lizzie Walker	5 ft 10 in (1.78 m)	Jr	Meridian Community College	Crystal Springs, MS
G	5	Gabrielle Bunch	5 ft 9 in (1.75 m)	Sr	Mississippi College	Laurel, MS
G	10	Teniya Morant	5 ft 7 in (1.7 m)	Fr	Houston High School	Memphis, TN
G	11	Leah Turner	5 ft 7 in (1.7 m)	Fr	Griffin High School	Hampton, GA
F	12	Leah Perry	6 ft 0 in (1.83 m)	Jr	Central Arkansas	Cairo, GA
C	13	Janna Dauer	6 ft 3 in (1.91 m)	Fr	Saarlouis Royals	Saarlouis, Germany
F	20	Ja'la Douglas	5 ft 10 in (1.78 m)	Fr	Central High School	Louisville, KY
F	21	Amberly Brown	6 ft 1 in (1.85 m)	Jr	Meridian Community College	Rome, GA
F	22	Aaliyah Duranham	5 ft 9 in (1.75 m)	Fr	Griffin High School	Griffin, GA
F	23	SyAnn Holmes	6 ft 0 in (1.83 m)	Sr	Lincoln College	Evanston, IL
C	30	Lucia Lara	6 ft 3 in (1.91 m)	Fr	Baloncesto Alcobendas	Madrid, Spain
C	33	Zyan Reynolds	6 ft 3 in (1.91 m)	Jr	Texas Southern	Baltimore, MD

Head coach

- Kimberly Anderson (Claflin)

Assistant coach(es)

- Jason James (Benedict)
- Ashley Shields (SW Tennessee CC)
- Felton Young (Jacksonville)

Legend

- (C) Team captain
- (S) Suspended
- (I) Ineligible
- (W) Walk-on
- Injured
- Current redshirt

Roster
Last update: May 28, 2024

== Schedule and results ==
Date time, TV	Rank^{#}	Opponent^{#}	Result	Record	Site (attendance) city, state
Exhibition
November 2, 2023*; 6:00 p.m.		Voorhees	W 85–32	–	Harrison HPER Complex (978); Itta Bena, MS
Non-conference regular season
November 6, 2023*; 5:00 p.m.		at No. 5 Utah	L 45–104	0–1	Jon M. Huntsman Center (3,830); Salt Lake City, UT
November 12, 2023*; 2:00 p.m., SECN+		at No. 1 LSU	L 47–109	0–2	Pete Maravich Assembly Center (10,720); Baton Rouge, LA
November 16, 2023*; 7:00 p.m.		at McNeese; McNeese MTE	W 85–82	1–2	The Legacy Center (1,698); Lake Charles, LA
November 17, 2023*; 4:00 p.m.		vs. Louisiana–Monroe; McNeese MTE	L 62–73	1–3	The Legacy Center (150); Lake Charles, LA
November 18, 2023*; 1:00 p.m.		vs. Milwaukee; McNeese MTE	L 61–67	1–4	The Legacy Center (150); Lake Charles, LA
November 24, 2023*; 1:00 p.m., SECN+		at No. 1 South Carolina	L 19–101	1–5	Colonial Life Arena (14,558); Columbia, SC
November 27, 2023*; 11:00 a.m.		Lipscomb	L 55–64	1–6	Harrison HPER Complex (1,265); Itta Bena, MS
November 29, 2023*; 6:00 p.m., ESPN+		at UAB	L 56–88	1–7	Bartow Arena (310); Birmingham, AL
December 4, 2023*; 7:00 p.m., MW Network		at New Mexico	L 45–68	1–8	The Pit (4,514); Albuquerque, NM
December 12, 2023*; 6:30 p.m., SECN+		at Ole Miss	L 56–84	1–9	SJB Pavilion (2,443); Oxford, MS
December 18, 2023*; 7:00 p.m., SECN+		at Texas A&M	L 45–95	1–10	Reed Arena (3,439); College Station, TX
December 29, 2023*; 6:30 p.m., SECN+		at Mississippi State	L 35–99	1–11	Humphrey Coliseum (4,772); Starkville, MS
December 31, 2023*; 2:00 p.m., SECN+		at Alabama	L 26–91	1–12	Coleman Coliseum (2,036); Tuscaloosa, AL
SWAC regular season
January 6, 2024; 4:00 p.m.		Alabama State	L 54–57	1–13 (0–1)	Harrison HPER Complex (2,305); Itta Bena, MS
January 8, 2024; 5:30 p.m.		Alabama A&M	L 67–83	1–14 (0–2)	Harrison HPER Complex (1,974); Itta Bena, MS
January 13, 2024; 3:00 p.m.		at Prairie View A&M	L 69–83	1–15 (0–3)	William Nicks Building (–); Prairie View, TX
January 15, 2024; 12:00 p.m.		at Texas Southern	W 70–69	2–15 (1–3)	H&PE Arena (347); Houston, TX
January 20, 2024; 4:00 p.m.		Bethune–Cookman	L 57–76	2–16 (1–4)	Harrison HPER Complex (2,012); Itta Bena, MS
January 22, 2024; 5:30 p.m.		Florida A&M	L 55–62	2–17 (1–5)	Harrison HPER Complex (1,025); Itta Bena, MS
January 27, 2024; 3:00 p.m.		at Grambling State	L 71–81	2–18 (1–6)	Fredrick C. Hobdy Assembly Center (1,068); Grambling, LA
January 29, 2024; 5:30 p.m.		at Southern	L 45–64	2–19 (1–7)	F. G. Clark Center (1,586); Baton Rouge, LA
February 3, 2024; 4:00 p.m.		Arkansas–Pine Bluff	L 60–76	2–20 (1–8)	Harrison HPER Complex (1,409); Itta Bena, MS
February 10, 2024; 4:00 p.m.		Jackson State	L 54–70	2–21 (1–9)	Harrison HPER Complex (2,209); Itta Bena, MS
February 12, 2024; 5:30 p.m.		Alcorn State	L 65–70	2–22 (1–10)	Harrison HPER Complex (2,025); Itta Bena, MS
February 17, 2024; 12:00 p.m.		at Alabama A&M	L 51–64	2–23 (1–11)	Alabama A&M Events Center (1,003); Huntsville, AL
February 19, 2024; 5:30 p.m.		at Alabama State	W 67–59	3–23 (2–11)	Dunn–Oliver Acadome (–); Montgomery, AL
February 24, 2024; 4:00 p.m.		Texas Southern	W 71–65	4–23 (3–11)	Harrison HPER Complex (1,500); Itta Bena, MS
February 26, 2024; 5:30 p.m.		Prairie View A&M	L 63–69	4–24 (3–12)	Harrison HPER Complex (1,258); Itta Bena, MS
March 2, 2024; 3:00 p.m.		at Arkansas–Pine Bluff	L 57–78	4–25 (3–13)	H.O. Clemmons Arena (2,143); Pine Bluff, AR
March 7, 2024; 5:30 p.m.		at Alcorn State	L 48–63	4–26 (3–14)	Davey Whitney Complex (256); Lorman, MS
March 9, 2024; 12:00 p.m.		at Jackson State	L 59–77	4–27 (3–15)	Williams Assembly Center (3,170); Jackson, MS
*Non-conference game. ^{#}Rankings from AP poll. (#) Tournament seedings in parentheses. All times are in Central.
