= 2023–24 Grambling State Tigers women's basketball team =

American college basketball season

2023–24 Grambling State Tigers women's basketball

WNIT, Second Round
- Conference: Southwestern Athletic Conference
- Record: 23–10 (15–3 SWAC)
- Head coach: Courtney Simmons (1st season)
- Assistant coaches: Kyra Collier; Brandi Washington
- Home arena: Fredrick C. Hobdy Assembly Center

2023–24 SWAC women's basketball standings
	Conf.				Overall
Team	W		L	PCT	W		L	PCT
Jackson State †	18	–	0	1.000	26	–	7	.788
Grambling State	15	–	3	.833	23	–	10	.697
Southern	13	–	5	.722	15	–	15	.500
Arkansas–Pine Bluff	11	–	7	.611	17	–	16	.515
Alabama A&M	10	–	8	.556	15	–	16	.484
Florida A&M	8	–	10	.444	9	–	21	.300
Alcorn State	8	–	10	.444	12	–	20	.375
Prairie View A&M	7	–	11	.389	11	–	18	.379
Texas Southern	6	–	12	.333	7	–	22	.241
Bethune–Cookman	6	–	12	.333	15	–	16	.484
Mississippi Valley State	3	–	15	.167	4	–	27	.129
Alabama State	3	–	15	.167	3	–	26	.103
† 2024 SWAC tournament winner

The 2023–24 Grambling State Tigers women's basketball team represented Grambling State University during the 2023–24 NCAA Division I women's basketball season. The Tigers, who were led by first-year head coach Courtney Simmons, played their home games at the Fredrick C. Hobdy Assembly Center in Grambling, Louisiana as members of the Southwestern Athletic Conference (SWAC).

== Previous season ==
The Tigers finished the 2022–23 season 10–20, 9–9 in SWAC play, to finish in eighth place. They were defeated by top-seeded Jackson State in the first round of the SWAC tournament.

On March 20, 2023, the school announced that head coach Freddie Murray would be relieved of his duties, after seven seasons at the helm. On April 6, 2023, longtime Troy assistant coach Courtney Simmons was hired as the Tigers' next head coach.

== Roster ==
2023–24 Grambling State Tigers women's basketball team
Players
Coaches

Pos.	#	Name	Height	Year	Previous school	Hometown
PG	1	Douthshine Prien	5 ft 7 in (1.7 m)	Jr	Pensacola State College	Boynton Beach, FL
G	2	Jordaynia Ivie	5 ft 9 in (1.75 m)	Jr	UNC Asheville	St. Louis, MO
SG	3	Arianna Mosley	5 ft 9 in (1.75 m)	Fr	Tampa Prep	Tampa, FL
SG	4	Jazmyne Jackson	5 ft 7 in (1.7 m)	So	Braswell High School	Aubrey, TX
SG	5	Zayla Tinner	5 ft 10 in (1.78 m)	Jr	Northwest Florida State College	Amarillo, TX
SF	10	Brenda McKinney	6 ft 1 in (1.85 m)	Jr	Chipola College	Washington, D.C.
PG	12	Kahia Warmsley	5 ft 8 in (1.73 m)	Jr	Tulane	Shreveport, LA
SG	13	Kaci Chairs	5 ft 9 in (1.75 m)	GS	Metairie Park Country Day School	New Orleans, LA
PF	15	Anijah Grant	6 ft 2 in (1.88 m)	GS	Tulane	Orlando, FL
PG	23	Jordyn Carter	5 ft 7 in (1.7 m)	GS	North Texas	Austin, TX
SG	24	DeMya Young	5 ft 10 in (1.78 m)	So	Little Rock	Manor, TX
PF	32	Tiana Gardner	6 ft 1 in (1.85 m)	Sr	Incarnate Word	Austin, TX
C	34	Amanda Blake	6 ft 2 in (1.88 m)	Sr	UNC Asheville	Summerville, SC

Head coach

- Courtney Simmons (Louisville)

Assistant coach(es)

- Kyra Collier (Little Rock)
- Brandi Washington (Grambling State)

Legend

- (C) Team captain
- (S) Suspended
- (I) Ineligible
- (W) Walk-on
- Injured
- Current redshirt

Roster
Last update: April 19, 2024

== Schedule and results ==
Date time, TV	Rank^{#}	Opponent^{#}	Result	Record	Site (attendance) city, state
Non-conference regular season
November 6, 2023*; 5:30 p.m.		Champion Christian	W 93–48	1–0	Fredrick C. Hobdy Assembly Center (176); Grambling, LA
November 9, 2023*; 6:30 p.m., ESPN+		at North Texas	L 60–83	1–1	The Super Pit (1,645); Denton, TX
November 13, 2023*; 6:00 p.m., ESPN+		at South Florida	L 57–83	1–2	Yuengling Center (2,061); Tampa, FL
November 16, 2023*; 6:00 p.m., ESPN+		Arizona State; Pac-12/SWAC Legacy Series	W 70–67	2–2	Fredrick C. Hobdy Assembly Center (521); Grambling, LA
November 19, 2023*; 2:00 p.m., ESPN+		at Houston	L 74–106	2–3	Fertitta Center (897); Houston, TX
November 22, 2023*; 6:30 p.m., ESPN+		at Northwestern State	W 64–59	3–3	Prather Coliseum (387); Natchitoches, LA
December 1, 2023*; 6:00 p.m., ESPN+		at Oklahoma	L 69–103	3–4	Lloyd Noble Center (2,305); Norman, OK
December 11, 2023*; 12:00 p.m.		Wiley	W 109–41	4–4	Fredrick C. Hobdy Assembly Center (987); Grambling, LA
December 13, 2023*; 11:00 a.m., B1G+		at Minnesota	L 64–96	4–5	Williams Arena (5,291); Minneapolis, MN
December 20, 2023*; 12:00 p.m.		Nicholls	W 69–50	5–5	Fredrick C. Hobdy Assembly Center (87); Grambling, LA
January 2, 2024*; 2:00 p.m.		Biblical Studies	W 159–18	6–5	Fredrick C. Hobdy Assembly Center (65); Grambling, LA
SWAC regular season
January 6, 2024; 2:00 p.m.		Prairie View A&M	W 82–54	7–5 (1–0)	Fredrick C. Hobdy Assembly Center (–); Grambling, LA
January 8, 2024; 5:30 p.m.		Texas Southern	L 67–72	7–6 (1–1)	Fredrick C. Hobdy Assembly Center (268); Grambling, LA
January 13, 2024; 1:00 p.m.		at Bethune–Cookman	W 63–62	8–6 (2–1)	Moore Gymnasium (776); Daytona Beach, FL
January 15, 2024; 4:30 p.m.		at Florida A&M	W 88–85 ^{3OT}	9–6 (3–1)	Al Lawson Center (740); Tallahassee, FL
January 20, 2024; 12:00 p.m.		Southern	W 69–45	10–6 (4–1)	Fredrick C. Hobdy Assembly Center (–); Grambling, LA
January 27, 2024; 2:00 p.m.		Mississippi Valley State	W 81–71	11–6 (5–1)	Fredrick C. Hobdy Assembly Center (1,068); Grambling, LA
January 29, 2024; 5:30 p.m.		Arkansas–Pine Bluff	L 49–56	11–7 (5–2)	Fredrick C. Hobdy Assembly Center (1,133); Grambling, LA
February 3, 2024; 3:00 p.m.		at Jackson State	L 63–71	11–8 (5–3)	Williams Assembly Center (856); Jackson, MS
February 5, 2024; 5:30 p.m.		at Alcorn State	W 72–55	12–8 (6–3)	Davey Whitney Complex (752); Lorman, MS
February 10, 2024; 2:00 p.m.		Alabama State	W 65–48	13–8 (7–3)	Fredrick C. Hobdy Assembly Center (629); Grambling, LA
February 12, 2024; 5:30 p.m.		Alabama A&M	W 69–52	14–8 (8–3)	Fredrick C. Hobdy Assembly Center (518); Grambling, LA
February 17, 2024; 3:00 p.m.		at Texas Southern	W 60–55	15–8 (9–3)	H&PE Arena (2,863); Houston, TX
February 19, 2024; 5:30 p.m.		at Prairie View A&M	W 64–55	16–8 (10–3)	William Nicks Building (513); Prairie View, TX
February 24, 2024; 3:00 p.m.		at Southern	W 59–57	17–8 (11–3)	F. G. Clark Center (4,689); Baton Rouge, LA
March 2, 2024; 2:00 p.m.		Florida A&M	W 65–54	18–8 (12–3)	Fredrick C. Hobdy Assembly Center (916); Grambling, LA
March 4, 2024; 5:30 p.m.		Bethune–Cookman	W 64–54	19–8 (13–3)	Fredrick C. Hobdy Assembly Center (979); Grambling, LA
March 7, 2024; 5:30 p.m.		at Alabama A&M	W 60–55	20–8 (14–3)	Alabama A&M Events Center (1,117); Huntsville, AL
March 9, 2024; 2:00 p.m.		at Alabama State	W 52–47	21–8 (15–3)	Dunn–Oliver Acadome (2,234); Montgomery, AL
SWAC tournament
March 13, 2024; 11:00 a.m., ESPN+	(2)	vs. (7) Florida A&M; Quarterfinals	W 66–60	22–8	Bartow Arena (428); Birmingham, AL
March 15, 2024; 11:00 a.m., ESPN+	(2)	vs. (6) Alcorn State; Semifinals	L 59–61	22–9	Bartow Arena (927); Birmingham, AL
WNIT
March 21, 2024; 7:00 p.m.		at Oral Roberts; First round	W 93–91	23–9	Mabee Center (2,591); Tulsa, OK
March 25, 2024; 6:30 p.m., ESPN+		at Louisiana–Monroe; Second round	L 76–102	23–10	Fant–Ewing Coliseum (2,805); Monroe, LA
*Non-conference game. ^{#}Rankings from AP poll. (#) Tournament seedings in parentheses. All times are in Central.
