= 2023–24 Ole Miss Rebels women's basketball team =

Intercollegiate basketball season

2023–24 Ole Miss Rebels women's basketball

Battle 4 Atlantis champions

NCAA tournament, Second round
- Conference: Southeastern Conference
- Record: 24–9 (12–4 SEC)
- Head coach: Yolett McPhee-McCuin (6th season)
- Assistant coaches: Chris Ayers; Bojan Jankovic; Jaida Williams; Patrick Henry; Erika Sisk
- Home arena: SJB Pavilion

2023–24 SEC women's basketball standings
	Conf.				Overall
Team	W		L	PCT	W		L	PCT
No. 1 South Carolina †	16	–	0	1.000	38	–	0	1.000
No. 6 LSU	13	–	3	.813	31	–	6	.838
Ole Miss	12	–	4	.750	24	–	9	.727
Alabama	10	–	6	.625	24	–	10	.706
Tennessee	10	–	6	.625	20	–	13	.606
Vanderbilt	9	–	7	.563	23	–	10	.697
Mississippi State	8	–	8	.500	23	–	12	.657
Auburn	8	–	8	.500	20	–	12	.625
Texas A&M	6	–	10	.375	19	–	13	.594
Arkansas	6	–	10	.375	18	–	15	.545
Florida	5	–	11	.313	16	–	16	.500
Kentucky	4	–	12	.250	12	–	20	.375
Georgia	3	–	13	.188	12	–	18	.400
Missouri	2	–	14	.125	11	–	19	.367
† 2024 SEC tournament winner Rankings from AP poll

The 2023–24 Ole Miss Rebels women's basketball team represented the University of Mississippi during the 2023–24 NCAA Division I women's basketball season. The Rebels, led by sixth-year head coach Yolett McPhee-McCuin, played their home games at The Sandy and John Black Pavilion at Ole Miss and competed as members of the Southeastern Conference (SEC).

== Previous season ==
The Rebels finished the season 25–9 (11–5 SEC) and received an at-large bid to the NCAA tournament, where they defeated Gonzaga and one seed Stanford before falling to Louisville in their first Sweet Sixteen appearance since 2007.

== Offseason ==
=== Departures ===
Ole Miss departures
Name	Number	Pos.	Height	Year	Hometown	Reason for departure	Ref
Brooke Moore	0	G	5'7"	Graduate student	Atlanta, GA	Became graduate manager	
Myah Taylor	1	G	5'7"	Graduate student	Olive Branch, MS	Graduated	
Destiny Salary	10	G	6'0"	Junior	Jonesboro, AR	Transferred to Western Kentucky	
Jordan Berry	12	G	5'7"	Senior	New Orleans, LA	Graduated	
Angel Baker	15	G	5'8"	Senior	Indianapolis, IN	Graduated	

=== 2023 recruiting class ===
College recruiting
Name	Hometown	School	Height	Weight	Commit date
Zakiya Stephenson; G	Virginia Beach, VA	Princess Anne HS	5 ft 4 in (1.63 m)	N/A	
Zakiya Stephenson; G	Recruit ratings: ESPN: (93)				
J'Adore Young; C	Mauldin, SC	Greenville HS	6 ft 4 in (1.93 m)	N/A	
J'Adore Young; C	Recruit ratings: ESPN: (91)				
Marija Avlijas; G	Belgrade, Serbia	ŽKK Art Basket	5 ft 11 in (1.80 m)	N/A	
Marija Avlijas; G	Recruit ratings: No ratings found				
Rhema Collins; F	Nassau, Bahamas	The Webb School	6 ft 2 in (1.88 m)	N/A	
Rhema Collins; F	Recruit ratings: No ratings found				
Mariyah Noel; G	Kansas City, KS	Bonner Springs HS	5 ft 11 in (1.80 m)	N/A	
Mariyah Noel; G	Recruit ratings: No ratings found				
Overall recruit ranking:
Note: In many cases, Scout, Rivals, 247Sports, On3, and ESPN may conflict in their listings of height and weight.; In these cases, the average was taken. ESPN grades are on a 100-point scale.; Sources:

=== Incoming transfers ===
Ole Miss incoming transfers
Name	Number	Pos.	Height	Year	Hometown	Previous school
KK Deans	1	G	5'8"	Graduate student	Greensboro, NC	Florida
Kennedy Todd-Williams	3	G	6'0"	Senior	Jacksonville, NC	North Carolina
Kharyssa Richardson	33	F	6'2"	Sophomore	Douglasville, GA	Auburn

== Roster ==
2023–24 Ole Miss Rebels women's basketball team
Players
Coaches

Pos.	#	Name	Height	Year	Previous school	Hometown
G	1	KK Deans	5 ft 8 in (1.73 m)	GS	Connections Academy; Florida	Greensboro, NC (United States) (North Carolina)
G	2	Marquesha Davis	6 ft 0 in (1.83 m)	Sr	Springdale HS; Arkansas	McGehee, AR (United States) (Arkansas)
G	3	Kennedy Todd-Williams	6 ft 0 in (1.83 m)	Sr	Jacksonville HS; North Carolina	Jacksonville, NC (United States) (North Carolina)
F	5	Snudda Collins	6 ft 1 in (1.85 m)	Sr	Brookhaven HS	Brookhaven, MS (United States) (Mississippi)
C	10	J'Adore Young	6 ft 4 in (1.93 m)	Fr	Greenville HS	Mauldin, SC (United States) (South Carolina)
G	12	Marija Avlijas	5 ft 11 in (1.8 m)	Fr	ŽKK Art Basket	Belgrade, Serbia
G	13	Mariyah Noel	5 ft 11 in (1.8 m)	Fr	Bonner Springs HS	Kansas City, KS (United States)
G	20	Ayanna Thompson	6 ft 1 in (1.85 m)	So	DeSoto HS	DeSoto, TX (United States) (Texas)
G	21	Zakiya Stephenson	5 ft 4 in (1.63 m)	Fr	Princess Anne HS	Virginia Beach, VA (United States)
F	22	Tyia Singleton	6 ft 2 in (1.88 m)	GS	Winter Haven HS; Rutgers	Winter Haven, FL (United States) (Florida)
G	23	Elauna Eaton	6 ft 0 in (1.83 m)	Jr	Nettleton HS; Arkansas	Helena, AR (United States) (Arkansas)
F	24	Madison Scott	6 ft 1 in (1.85 m)	Sr	Bishop McNamara HS	Indian Head, MD (United States) (Maryland)
C	32	Rita Igbokwe	6 ft 4 in (1.93 m)	Sr	Mundy's Mill HS; Pittsburgh	Jonesboro, GA (United States) (Georgia (U.S. state))
F	33	Kharyssa Richardson	6 ft 2 in (1.88 m)	So	New Manchester HS; Auburn	Douglasville, GA (United States) (Georgia (U.S. state))
F	35	Rhema Collins	6 ft 2 in (1.88 m)	Fr	The Webb School	Nassau, Bahamas (The Bahamas)

Head coach

- Yolett McPhee-McCuin (Rhode Island)

Assistant coach(es)

- Chris Ayers (Florida A&M)
- Bojan Jankovic (Ozarks)
- Jaida Williams (Cal Poly Pomona)
- Patrick Henry (Ohio)
- Erika Sisk (Ole Miss)

Legend

- (C) Team captain
- (S) Suspended
- (I) Ineligible
- (W) Walk-on
- Injured
- Current redshirt

Roster

== Schedule and results ==
Date time, TV	Rank^{#}	Opponent^{#}	Result	Record	High points	High rebounds	High assists	Site (attendance) city, state
Exhibition
October 29, 2023*; 3:00 p.m.	No. 12	Rust	W 91–44		–	–	–	SJB Pavilion; Oxford, MS
Non-conference regular season
November 6, 2023*; 11:00 a.m., SECN+	No. 12	Queens	W 91–44	1–0	17 – S. Collins	10 – Scott	6 – Deans	SJB Pavilion (7,196); Oxford, MS
November 9, 2023*; 6:00 p.m., SECN	No. 12	Oklahoma	L 70–80	1–1	15 – S. Collins	8 – Scott	5 – Deans	SJB Pavilion (2,030); Oxford, MS
November 15, 2023*; 6:30 p.m., SECN+	No. 23	Temple	W 80–63	2–1	16 – Tied	7 – Tied	8 – Deans	SJB Pavilion (2,335); Oxford, MS
November 18, 2023*; 11:00 a.m., FloHoops	No. 23	vs. Howard; Battle 4 Atlantis quarterfinals	W 67–54	3–1	21 – Scott	14 – Scott	2 – Tied	Imperial Arena (284); Nassau, Bahamas
November 19, 2023*; 11:00 a.m., FloHoops	No. 23	vs. Arizona; Battle 4 Atlantis semifinals	W 56–47	4–1	17 – Davis	11 – Scott	3 – Scott	Imperial Arena (207); Nassau, Bahamas
November 20, 2023*; 11:00 a.m., ESPN2	No. 24	vs. Michigan; Battle 4 Atlantis championship	W 60–49	5–1	11 – Avlijas	7 – Tied	3 – Avlijas	Imperial Arena; Nassau, Bahamas
November 25, 2023*; 3:00 p.m., SECN+	No. 24	Little Rock	W 58–45	6–1	11 – Tied	9 – Singleton	4 – Stephenson	SJB Pavilion (2,258); Oxford, MS
November 29, 2023*; 8:15 p.m., ESPNU	No. 19	No. 22 Louisville; ACC–SEC Challenge	L 58–64	6–2	22 – S. Collins	6 – Davis	6 – Stephenson	SJB Pavilion (2,694); Oxford, MS
December 2, 2023*; 2:00 p.m., ESPN+	No. 19	at Southern Miss	L 59–61	6–3	15 – Davis	6 – Scott	4 – Scott	Reed Green Coliseum (2,653); Hattiesburg, MS
December 12, 2023*; 6:30 p.m., SECN+		Mississippi Valley State	W 84–56	7–3	14 – S. Collins	10 – Igbokwe	3 – Stephenson	SJB Pavilion (2,443); Oxford, MS
December 18, 2023*; 6:00 p.m., ESPN+		at South Alabama	W 64–41	8–3	12 – Davis	9 – Igbokwe	3 – Todd-Williams	Mitchell Center (617); Mobile, AL
December 21, 2023*; 12:00 p.m.		at Arkansas–Pine Bluff	W 62–47	9–3	13 – Davis	13 – Igbokwe	6 – Scott	H.O. Clemmons Arena (2,246); Pine Bluff, AR
December 30, 2023*; 3:00 p.m., SECN+		Alcorn State	W 76–37	10–3	11 – Scott	6 – Scott	4 – Noel	SJB Pavilion (2,266); Oxford, MS
SEC regular season
January 4, 2024; 6:00 p.m., SECN+		at Alabama	W 55–45	11–3 (1–0)	12 – Scott	10 – Igbokwe	5 – Scott	Coleman Coliseum (2,140); Tuscaloosa, AL
January 7, 2024; 2:00 p.m., ESPN		No. 7 LSU	L 73–84	11–4 (1–1)	24 – Davis	7 – Davis	8 – Scott	SJB Pavilion (9,074); Oxford, MS
January 11, 2024; 6:30 p.m., SECN+		Auburn	W 58–55	12–4 (2–1)	15 – Davis	8 – Igbokwe	8 – Scott	SJB Pavilion (2,350); Oxford, MS
January 14, 2024; 4:00 p.m., SECN		at Mississippi State	L 57–69	12–5 (2–2)	19 – Davis	10 – Igbokwe	3 – Scott	Humphrey Coliseum (7,101); Starkville, MS
January 21, 2024; 12:00 p.m., SECN		at Georgia	W 69–59	13–5 (3–2)	22 – Todd-Williams	6 – Todd-Williams	7 – Scott	Stegeman Coliseum (3,646); Athens, GA
January 25, 2024; 6:00 p.m., SECN		Florida	W 81–70	14–5 (4–2)	23 – Davis	9 – Todd-Williams	8 – Todd-Williams	SJB Pavilion (2,450); Oxford, MS
January 28, 2024; 2:00 p.m., ESPN		Tennessee	W 80–75	15–5 (5–2)	25 – Davis	10 – Scott	7 – Todd-Williams	SJB Pavilion (3,863); Oxford, MS
February 1, 2024; 6:30 p.m., SECN+		at Vanderbilt	W 67–61	16–5 (6–2)	25 – Davis	11 – Singleton	2 – Todd-Williams	Memorial Gymnasium (2,106); Nashville, TN
February 4, 2024; 1:00 p.m., ESPN2		at No. 1 South Carolina	L 56–85	16–6 (6–3)	17 – Scott	8 – Scott	2 – Scott	Colonial Life Arena (18,000); Columbia, SC
February 8, 2024; 6:30 p.m., SECN+		Texas A&M	L 53–72	16–7 (6–4)	15 – Scott	10 – Igbokwe	4 – Scott	SJB Pavilion (2,599); Oxford, MS
February 15, 2024; 5:00 p.m., SECN+		at Florida	W 77–67 ^{OT}	17–7 (7–4)	27 – Scott	12 – Tied	2 – Singleton	O'Connell Center (1,686); Gainesville, FL
February 18, 2024; 3:00 p.m., SECN+		Mississippi State	W 75–71 ^{OT}	18–7 (8–4)	20 – Scott	14 – Igbokwe	5 – Todd-Williams	SJB Pavilion (4,736); Oxford, MS
February 22, 2024; 6:30 p.m., SECN+		Georgia	W 73–51	19–7 (9–4)	20 – Davis	7 – Igbokwe	6 – Scott	SJB Pavilion (2,505); Oxford, MS
February 26, 2024; 6:00 p.m., SECN		at Missouri	W 66–45	20–7 (10–4)	14 – S. Collins	9 – Singleton	4 – Todd-Williams	Mizzou Arena (4,140); Columbia, MO
February 29, 2024; 6:00 p.m., SECN+		at Kentucky	W 75–45	21–7 (11–4)	16 – Scott	8 – Todd-Williams	6 – Scott	Rupp Arena (3,227); Lexington, KY
March 3, 2024; 3:00 p.m., SECN		Arkansas	W 87–43	22–7 (12–4)	18 – S. Collins	13 – Scott	7 – Scott	SJB Pavilion (3,353); Oxford, MS
SEC Tournament
March 8, 2024; 7:30 p.m., SECN	(3)	vs. (11) Florida; Quarterfinals	W 84–74	23–7	33 – Davis	15 – Scott	5 – Todd-Williams	Bon Secours Wellness Arena (8,377); Greenville, SC
March 9, 2024; 6:00 p.m., ESPNU	(3)	vs. (2) No. 8 LSU; Semifinals	L 67–75	23–8	22 – Scott	7 – Tied	4 – Scott	Bon Secours Wellness Arena (12,784); Greenville, SC
NCAA Tournament
March 23, 2024*; 3:45 p.m., ESPNU	(7 A1)	vs. (10 A1) Marquette; First round	W 67–55	24–8	20 – Scott	9 – Igbokwe	4 – Scott	Purcell Pavilion (9,149); South Bend, IN
March 25, 2024*; 1:00 p.m., ESPN	(7 A1)	at (2 A1) No. 9 Notre Dame; Second round	L 56–71	24–9	15 – Tied	7 – Igbokwe	3 – Scott	Purcell Pavilion (7,882); South Bend, IN
*Non-conference game. ^{#}Rankings from AP Poll. (#) Tournament seedings in parentheses. A1=Albany 1. All times are in Central Time.

== Rankings ==
Ranking movements Legend: ██ Increase in ranking ██ Decrease in ranking — = Not ranked RV = Received votes
	Week																				
Poll	Pre	1	2	3	4	5	6	7	8	9	10	11	12	13	14	15	16	17	18	19	Final
AP	12	23	24	19	RV	RV	RV	RV	—	—	—	—	RV	—	—	—	RV	RV	RV	RV	Not released
Coaches	16	25	23	20	RV	—	—	—	—	—	—	—	RV	—	—	—	—	—	RV	—	

== See also ==
- 2023–24 Ole Miss Rebels men's basketball team
