= 2024 SWAC women's basketball tournament =

American Collegiate Tournament

- Classification: Division I
- Season: 2023–24
- Teams: 8
- Site: Bartow Arena; Birmingham, Alabama
- Champions: Jackson State (10th title)
- Winning coach: Tomekia Reed (3rd title)
- Television: ESPN+, ESPNU

2023–24 SWAC women's basketball standings
	Conf.				Overall
Team	W		L	PCT	W		L	PCT
Jackson State †	18	–	0	1.000	26	–	7	.788
Grambling State	15	–	3	.833	23	–	10	.697
Southern	13	–	5	.722	15	–	15	.500
Arkansas–Pine Bluff	11	–	7	.611	17	–	16	.515
Alabama A&M	10	–	8	.556	15	–	16	.484
Florida A&M	8	–	10	.444	9	–	21	.300
Alcorn State	8	–	10	.444	12	–	20	.375
Prairie View A&M	7	–	11	.389	11	–	18	.379
Texas Southern	6	–	12	.333	7	–	22	.241
Bethune–Cookman	6	–	12	.333	15	–	16	.484
Mississippi Valley State	3	–	15	.167	4	–	27	.129
Alabama State	3	–	15	.167	3	–	26	.103
† 2024 SWAC tournament winner

The 2024 SWAC Women's Basketball Tournament was the postseason men's basketball tournament for the 2023–24 season in the Southwestern Athletic Conference (SWAC). The tournament was held from March 13–16, 2024. The tournament winner, Jackson State received an automatic invitation to the 2024 NCAA Division I Men's Basketball Tournament. The tournament was sponsored by Pepsi.

== Seeds ==
Teams were seeded by record within the conference, with a tie–breaker system to seed teams with identical conference records. Only the top eight teams in the conference qualified for the tournament.

Seed	School	Conference	Tiebreaker
1	Jackson State	18–0	
2	Grambling State	15–3	
3	Southern	13–5	
4	Arkansas–Pine Bluff	11–7	
5	Alabama A&M	10–8	
6	Florida A&M	8–10	1–1 vs. Southern
7	Alcorn State	8–10	0–1 vs. Southern
8	Prairie View A&M	7–11	
DNQ	Texas Southern	6–12	1–0 vs. Bethune–Cookman
DNQ	Bethune–Cookman	6–12	0–1 vs. Texas Southern
DNQ	Mississippi Valley State	3–15	1–0 vs. Alabama State
DNQ	Alabama State	3–15	0–1 vs. Mississippi Valley State

== Schedule ==
Game	Time*	Matchup^{#}	Score	Television
Quarterfinals – Wednesday, March 13
1	11:00 a.m.	No. 2 Grambling State vs. No. 7 Florida A&M	66–60	ESPN+
2	5:30 p.m.	No. 1 Jackson State vs. No. 8 Prairie View A&M	67–58	ESPN+
Quarterfinals – Thursday, March 14
3	11:00 a.m.	No. 3 Southern vs. No. 6 Alcorn State	52–59	ESPN+
4	5:30 p.m.	No. 4 Arkansas–Pine Bluff vs. No. 5 Alabama A&M	82–74	ESPN+
Semifinals – Friday, March 15
5	11:00 a.m.	No. 1 Jackson State vs. No. 4 Arkansas–Pine Bluff	70–48	ESPN+
6	5:30 p.m.	No. 2 Grambling State vs. No. 6 Alcorn State	59–61	ESPN+
Championship – Saturday, March 16
7	4:30 p.m.	No. 1 Jackson State vs. No. 6 Alcorn State	68–44	ESPNU/ESPN+
*Game times in CDT. #-Rankings denote tournament seeding.

== Bracket ==
Quarterfinals; Wednesday, March 13; Thursday, March 14
1	Jackson State	67
8	Prairie View A&M	58
4	Arkansas–Pine Bluff	82
5	Alabama A&M	74
2	Grambling State	66
7	Florida A&M	60
3	Southern	52
6	Alcorn State	59

Semifinals; Friday, March 15
1	Jackson State	70
4	Arkansas–Pine Bluff	48
2	Grambling State	59
6	Alcorn State	61

Championship; Saturday, March 16
1	Jackson State	68
6	Alcorn State	44
