= Mississippi School for the Deaf =

School in Jackson, Mississippi, U.S.

Coordinates: 32°20′26″N 90°9′24″W

The Mississippi School for the Deaf (MSD) is a school for the deaf and hard of hearing in Jackson, Mississippi accredited by the Southern Association of Colleges and Schools (SACS). It offers elementary and secondary education (K–12), covering students from pre-kindergarten to twelfth grade.

== History ==
Established by the Mississippi Legislature on March 1, 1854, the school was originally named the Mississippi Institution for the Deaf and Dumb. In its early years, the school was troubled by a lack of teaching staff, which sometimes closed its doors, but in 1857 Lawrence Saunders, the school's first student, returned to teach. Although the school was closed during the American Civil War from 1861 to 1871 when the building was used as a hospital by the Confederate States Army, it never had to close for lack of instructors again. Saunders continued to teach until he died in an accident on Christmas Day in 1895.

== Facilities ==
The current 51 acres (210,000 m^{2}) campus is located at 1253 Eastover Drive in Jackson, the fifth building to house the school.

It includes dormitories.
