= Arkansas–Pine Bluff Golden Lions women's basketball =

Arkansas–Pine Bluff Golden Lions
2026–27 Arkansas–Pine Bluff Golden Lions women's basketball team
- University: University of Arkansas at Pine Bluff
- Head coach: Erica Leak (2nd season)
- Location: Pine Bluff, Arkansas
- Arena: K. L. Johnson Complex (capacity: 4,500)
- Conference: SWAC
- Nickname: Golden Lions
- Colors: Black and gold

The Arkansas–Pine Bluff Golden Lions women's basketball team represents the University of Arkansas at Pine Bluff in Pine Bluff, Arkansas. The school's team currently competes in the Southwestern Athletic Conference.

== History ==
The Golden Lions played their first season in women's basketball in 1998 when the program rejoined the SWAC. The Golden Lions have historically struggled in their time in basketball. Their record for wins in a season is 13, as set in the 2021-22 and 2012-13 seasons. They have had a conference record of .500 or better six times but have never recorded a total season of finishing above .500. They have never won the SWAC tournament or reached a postseason tournament in their history. In the 2022-23 season, the Lions advanced to the Final Round of the SWAC women's basketball tournament after upsetting #2 seed Alabama A&M and #3 seed Alabama State to face Southern.
