= Al Lawson Center =

Multi-purpose arena in Tallahassee, Florida

Alfred Lawson Jr. Multipurpose Center and Teaching Gymnasium
- "Al Lawson Center"
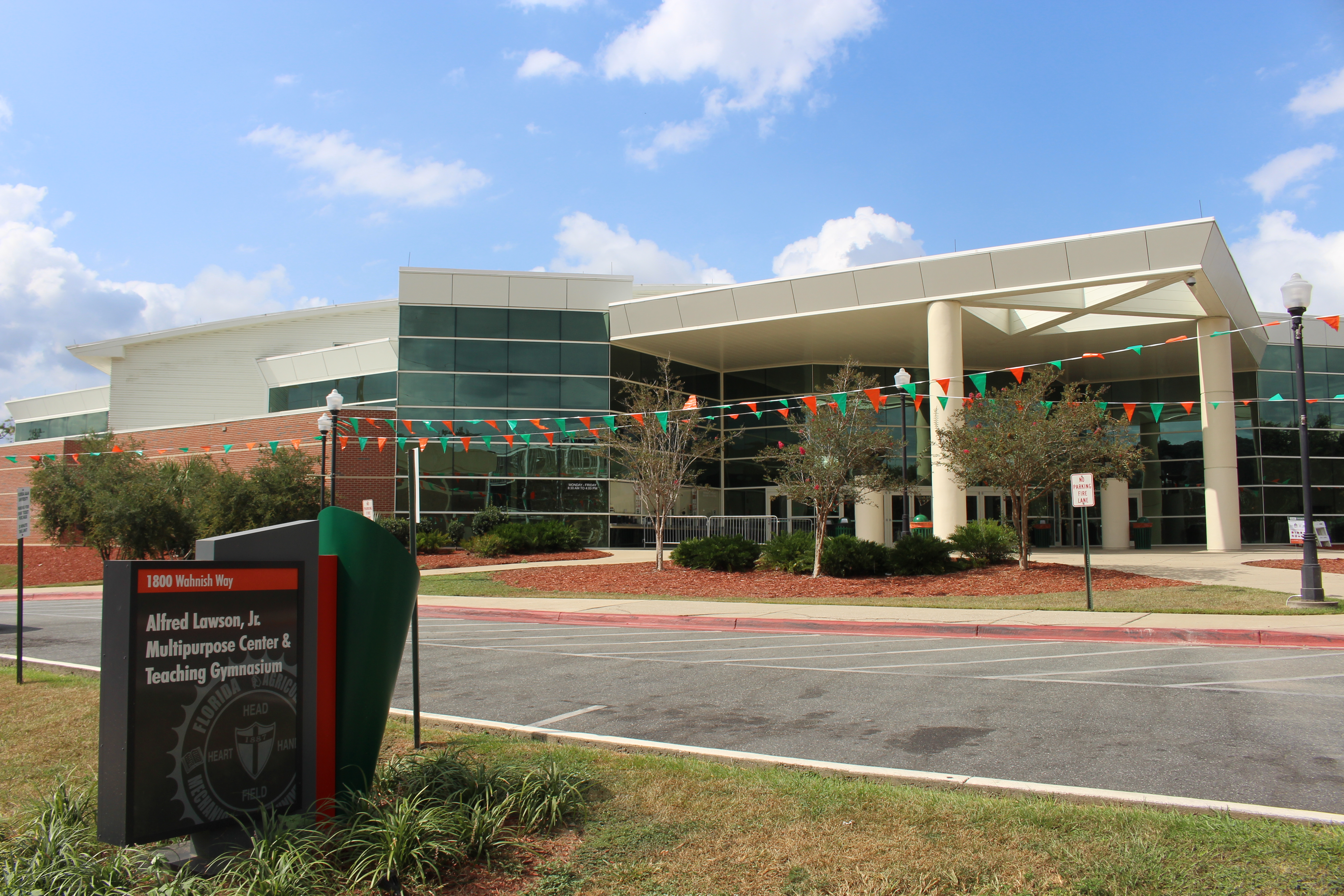
- Interactive map of Alfred Lawson Jr. Multipurpose Center and Teaching Gymnasium
- Location: 1800 Wahnish Way; Tallahassee, Florida 32310
- Coordinates: 30.424318°N 84.290473°W
- Owner: Florida A&M University
- Operator: Florida A&M University
- Capacity: 9,639 (basketball)
- Surface: Hardwood

Construction
- Groundbreaking: July 27, 2007
- Opened: April 4, 2009 (basketball)
- Cost: $40 Million ($60 million in 2025 dollars)
- Architects: Williams-Russell & Johnson, Inc; Akin & Associates Architects, Inc.
- Project manager: Turner Construction
- General contractors: F.L. Crane & Sons

Tenant
- Florida A&M Rattlers athletics

The Alfred Lawson Jr. Multipurpose Center and Teaching Gymnasium (known as the Al Lawson Center) is a 9,639-seat multi-purpose arena in Tallahassee, Florida on the Campus of Florida A&M University. It was built in 2009 and it is home to the Florida A&M men's and women's basketball teams and women's volleyball team. The arena replaced Jake Gaither Gymnasium, which is a 3,365-seat multi-purpose arena. The Al Lawson Center is the second biggest arena in Tallahassee, behind the 12,500-seat Donald L. Tucker Civic Center. The official ribbon cutting ceremony was April 8, 2009.

The center is named for Congressman Al Lawson, himself a former FAMU basketball player, who was instrumental in getting the funding for this center and other buildings on the campus of Florida A&M University during his tenure in the Florida Legislature.

The Al Lawson Center is the 3rd largest arena in the Florida Panhandle, and is often used as an alternative to the much larger and older Donald L. Tucker Center. It was the Tallahassee stop of actress/singer/native Floridian Ariana Grande's Honeymoon Tour in 2015.

== See also ==
- List of NCAA Division I basketball arenas
