= 2023 SWAC women's basketball tournament =

- Classification: Division I
- Season: 2022–23
- Teams: 8
- Site: Bartow Arena; Birmingham, Alabama
- Television: ESPN+

The 2023 SWAC Women's Basketball Tournament was the postseason women's basketball tournament for the 2022–23 season in the Southwestern Athletic Conference (SWAC). The tournament was held from March 8–11, 2023. The tournament winner received an automatic invitation to the 2023 NCAA Division I Men's Basketball Tournament. The tournament was sponsored by Cricket Wireless.

2022–23 SWAC women's basketball standings
| | Conf. | | | | Overall |
| Team | W | | L | PCT | W | | L | PCT |
|---|---|---|---|---|---|---|---|---|
| Jackson State | 17 | – | 1 | .944 | 21 | – | 9 | .700 |
| Alabama State | 12 | – | 6 | .667 | 16 | – | 15 | .516 |
| Alabama A&M | 12 | – | 6 | .667 | 14 | – | 15 | .483 |
| Prairie View A&M | 12 | – | 6 | .667 | 15 | – | 15 | .500 |
| Southern† | 12 | – | 6 | .667 | 18 | – | 14 | .563 |
| Arkansas–Pine Bluff | 10 | – | 8 | .556 | 14 | – | 17 | .452 |
| Bethune–Cookman | 10 | – | 8 | .556 | 11 | – | 18 | .379 |
| Grambling State | 9 | – | 9 | .500 | 10 | – | 20 | .333 |
| Alcorn State | 8 | – | 10 | .444 | 12 | – | 17 | .414 |
| Florida A&M | 4 | – | 14 | .222 | 6 | – | 23 | .207 |
| Texas Southern | 2 | – | 16 | .111 | 2 | – | 27 | .069 |
| Mississippi Valley State | 0 | – | 18 | .000 | 2 | – | 27 | .069 |
† 2023 SWAC tournament winner As of March 11, 2023

== Seeds ==
Teams were seeded by record within the conference, with a tie–breaker system to seed teams with identical conference records. Only the top eight teams in the conference will qualified for the tournament.

| Seed | School | Conference | Tiebreaker |
|---|---|---|---|
| 1 | Jackson State | 17-1 | |
| 2 | Alabama A&M | 12-6 | 3-2 vs. 12-6 teams; 117-115 margin vs. Alabama State |
| 3 | Alabama State | 12-6 | 3-2 vs. 12-6 teams; 115-117 margin vs. Alabama A&M |
| 4 | Southern | 12-6 | 3-3 vs. tied 12-6 teams |
| 5 | Prairie View A&M | 12-6 | 1-3 vs. tied 12-6 teams |
| 6 | Bethune-Cookman | 10-8 | 1-0 vs. Arkansas-Pine Bluff |
| 7 | Arkansas-Pine Bluff | 10-8 | 0-1 vs. Bethune-Cookman |
| 8 | Grambling State | 9-9 | |
| DNQ | Alcorn State | 8-10 | |
| DNQ | Florida A&M | 4-14 | |
| DNQ | Texas Southern | 2-16 | |
| DNQ | Mississippi Valley State | 0-18 | |

== Schedule ==
| Game | Time* | Matchup^{#} | Score | Television |
Quarterfinals – Wednesday, March 8, 2023
| 1 | 11:00 a.m. | No. 2 Alabama A&M vs. No. 7 Arkansas-Pine Bluff | 55-62 | ESPN+ |
| 2 | 5:30 p.m. | No. 1 Jackson State vs. No. 8 Grambling State | 59-50 | ESPN+ |
Quarterfinals – Thursday, March 9, 2023
| 3 | 11:00 a.m. | No. 3 Alabama State vs. No. 6 Bethune-Cookman | 70-61 | ESPN+ |
| 4 | 5:30 p.m. | No. 4 Southern vs. No. 5 Prairie View A&M | 64-37 | ESPN+ |
Semifinals – Friday, March 10, 2023
| 5 | 11:00 a.m. | No. 1 Jackson State vs. No. 4 Southern | 65–64 | ESPN+ |
| 6 | 5:30 p.m. | No. 7 Arkansas-Pine Bluff vs. No. 3 Alabama State | 71–66 | ESPN+ |
Championship – Saturday, March 11, 2023
| 7 | 1:00 p.m. | No. 4 Southern vs. No. 7 Arkansas-Pine Bluff | 62-53 | ESPN+ |
*Game times in CDT. #-Rankings denote tournament seeding.

== Bracket ==
Quarterfinals; March 8–9; ESPN+
1 | Jackson State | 59
8 | Grambling State | 50
4 | Southern | 64
5 | Prairie View A&M | 37
2 | Alabama A&M | 55
7 | Arkansas-Pine Bluff | 62
3 | Alabama State | 70
6 | Bethune-Cookman | 61

Semifinals; March 10; ESPN+
1 | Jackson State | 64
4 | Southern | 65
7 | Arkansas-Pine Bluff | 71
3 | Alabama State | 66

Championship; March 11; ESPN+
4 | Southern | 62
7 | Arkansas-Pine Bluff | 53
