= K. L. Johnson Complex =

Sports venue of the University of Arkansas–Pine Bluff

Kenneth L. Johnson Health, Physical, Education & Recreation Complex
- Interactive map of Kenneth L. Johnson Health, Physical, Education & Recreation Complex
- Location: 1401 University Dr, Pine Bluff, AR 71601
- Coordinates: 34.24604°N 92.024274°W
- Capacity: 4,500

Tenants
- Arkansas–Pine Bluff Golden Lions (basketball and volleyball)

Kenneth L. Johnson Health, Physical, Education & Recreation Complex is a 4,500-seat multi-purpose arena in Pine Bluff, Arkansas, USA. It is home to the University of Arkansas at Pine Bluff Lions men's and women's basketball teams and women's volleyball team. It originally opened in 1982 and was extensively renovated in 2006. The basketball and volleyball portion is called the Hubert O. Clemmons Basketball Arena.

It hosted the NCAA Women's Division II Basketball Championship in 1999 and 2000.

== See also ==
- List of NCAA Division I basketball arenas
