= 2023–24 Jacksonville Dolphins women's basketball team =

American college basketball season

2023–24 Jacksonville Dolphins women's basketball
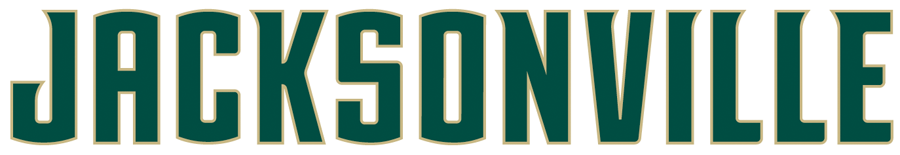
- Conference: ASUN Conference
- Record: 11–20 (6–10 ASUN)
- Head coach: Special Jennings (1st season)
- Assistant coaches: Ivana Boyd; Kayla Gordon; Rashad Lyle
- Home arena: Swisher Gymnasium

2023–24 ASUN women's basketball standings
	Conf.				Overall
Team	W		L	PCT	W		L	PCT
Florida Gulf Coast †	16	–	0	1.000	29	–	5	.853
Stetson	12	–	4	.750	17	–	15	.531
Central Arkansas	11	–	5	.688	21	–	12	.636
Lipscomb	10	–	6	.625	17	–	13	.567
Eastern Kentucky	9	–	7	.563	22	–	12	.647
North Alabama	8	–	8	.500	12	–	18	.400
Austin Peay	8	–	8	.500	17	–	16	.515
Kennesaw State	7	–	9	.438	11	–	19	.367
Jacksonville	6	–	10	.375	11	–	20	.355
Bellarmine*	5	–	11	.313	10	–	19	.345
North Florida	3	–	13	.188	9	–	21	.300
Queens*	1	–	15	.063	7	–	22	.241
† 2024 ASUN tournament winner *Ineligible for the 2024 NCAA tournament due to transition from Division II

The 2023–24 Jacksonville Dolphins women's basketball team represented Jacksonville University during the 2023–24 NCAA Division I women's basketball season. The Dolphins, led by first-year head coach Special Jennings, played their home games at Swisher Gymnasium in Jacksonville, Florida as members of the ASUN Conference.

The Dolphins finished the season 11–20, 6–10 in ASUN play, to finish in ninth place. They defeated Bellarmine before falling to top-seeded and eventual tournament champions Florida Gulf Coast in the quarterfinals of the ASUN tournament.

== Previous season ==
The Dolphins finished the 2022–23 season 12–17, 6–12 in ASUN play, to finish in a tie for ninth place. As the #10 seed in the ASUN tournament, they were defeated by #9 seed Stetson in the first round.

On March 15, 2023, the school announced that head coach Darnell Haney would be departing after five years with the program. On April 10, Montverde Academy women's basketball head coach Special Jennings was named as Haney's successor.

== Roster ==
2023–24 Jacksonville Dolphins women's basketball team
Players
Coaches

Pos.	#	Name	Height	Year	Previous school	Hometown
G	0	Julene Royale	5 ft 8 in (1.73 m)	So	Elexalde	Galdakao, Spain
G	1	Isamery Telleria	5 ft 9 in (1.75 m)	Jr	Liceo Ercília Pepín	San Francisco de Macorís, Dominican Republic
G	2	Kyshonna Brown	5 ft 11 in (1.8 m)	So	T. W. Josey High School	Augusta, GA
G	3	Sana'a Garrett	5 ft 7 in (1.7 m)	Fr	Friends' Central School	Philadelphia, PA
F	4	MaKayla Edwards	5 ft 11 in (1.8 m)	GS	Hawaii	Vallejo, CA
G	5	Bre'Yanna Frazier	5 ft 8 in (1.73 m)	GS	UCF	Jersey City, NJ
G	10	Edyn Battle	5 ft 7 in (1.7 m)	Jr	Miami (OH)	Gahanna, OH
F	11	Zaria Blake	6 ft 0 in (1.83 m)	So	Blanche Ely High School	Deerfield Beach, FL
G	12	Jalisa Dunlap	5 ft 10 in (1.78 m)	Jr	Eagle's Landing Christian Academy	Stockbridge, GA
G	13	Asiana Britt	5 ft 6 in (1.68 m)	Fr	Jean Ribault High School	Jacksonville, FL
F	15	Saniyah Craig	6 ft 1 in (1.85 m)	Fr	AZ Compass Prep	Phoenix, AZ
C	20	Jada Duckett	6 ft 2 in (1.88 m)	RS Sr	Old Dominion	Chicago, IL
G	23	LaRonda Quattlebaum	5 ft 5 in (1.65 m)	RS Fr	A.C. Flora High School	Columbia, SC
C	24	Jada Jones	6 ft 4 in (1.93 m)	Fr	Sandalwood High School	Jacksonville, FL
G		Emerielle James	5 ft 9 in (1.75 m)	Sr	Southern Miss	Orlando, FL

Head coach

- Special Jennings (Xavier)

Assistant coach(es)

- Ivana Boyd (Flagler)
- Kayla Gordon (Jacksonville)
- Rashad Lyle (Kennesaw State)

Legend

- (C) Team captain
- (S) Suspended
- (I) Ineligible
- (W) Walk-on
- Injured
- Current redshirt

Roster
Last update: December 29, 2023

== Schedule and results ==
Date time, TV	Rank^{#}	Opponent^{#}	Result	Record	High points	High rebounds	High assists	Site (attendance) city, state
Non-conference regular season
November 7, 2023*; 6:30 p.m., ESPN+		Warner	W 66–47	1–0	14 – 2 tied	10 – Craig	4 – Battle	Swisher Gymnasium (100); Jacksonville, FL
November 9, 2023*; 11:00 a.m., ACCNX		at Miami (FL)	L 53–81	1–1	16 – Battle	8 – Dunlap	3 – Edwards	Watsco Center (3,851); Coral Gables, FL
November 16, 2023*; 6:30 p.m., ESPN+		Georgia Southern	W 61–59	2–1	18 – Battle	10 – Jones	2 – 2 tied	Swisher Gymnasium (378); Jacksonville, FL
November 25, 2023*; 2:00 p.m.		at Florida A&M	L 54–59	2–2	16 – Craig	7 – Britt	4 – Frazier	Al Lawson Center (165); Tallahassee, FL
November 28, 2023*; 6:00 p.m.		at Bethune–Cookman	L 63–68	2–3	29 – Battle	11 – Craig	3 – 2 tied	Moore Gymnasium (454); Daytona Beach, FL
December 1, 2023*; 7:00 p.m., ESPN+		at FIU	L 81–88	2–4	21 – Battle	12 – Craig	4 – Battle	Ocean Bank Convocation Center (355); Miami, FL
December 4, 2023*; 6:30 p.m., ESPN+		Edward Waters	W 87–70	3–4	28 – Battle	7 – Jones	5 – Dunlap	Swisher Gymnasium (100); Jacksonville, FL
December 7, 2023*; 11:00 a.m., ACCNX		at No. 20 Florida State	L 73–99	3–5	26 – Battle	8 – Jones	3 – Garrett	Donald L. Tucker Civic Center (3,169); Tallahassee, FL
December 11, 2023*; 6:30 p.m., ESPN+		North Carolina Central	W 70–67	4–5	14 – 2 tied	6 – Battle	8 – Battle	Swisher Gymnasium (72); Jacksonville, FL
December 15, 2023*; 6:00 p.m., ESPN+		Marshall	L 77–102	4–6	26 – Battle	8 – Duckett	2 – Dunlap	Swisher Gymnasium (215); Jacksonville, FL
December 17, 2023*; 2:00 p.m., ESPN+		at Mercer	L 63–74	4–7	21 – Battle	6 – Duckett	1 – 5 tied	Hawkins Arena (1,017); Macon, GA
December 20, 2023*; 7:00 p.m., SECN+		at Alabama	L 61–99	4–8	16 – Battle	5 – Jones	2 – 2 tied	Coleman Coliseum (2,036); Tuscaloosa, AL
December 30, 2023*; 7:00 p.m., SECN+		at No. 7 LSU	L 68–110	4–9	17 – Battle	3 – 4 tied	2 – 2 tied	Pete Maravich Assembly Center (12,347); Baton Rouge, LA
ASUN regular season
January 4, 2024; 6:30 p.m., ESPN+		Florida Gulf Coast	L 47–69	4–10 (0–1)	11 – Craig	11 – Craig	2 – Garrett	Swisher Gymnasium (75); Jacksonville, FL
January 6, 2024; 2:00 p.m., ESPN+		Stetson	L 53–59	4–11 (0–2)	12 – McNeal	6 – Treadwell	3 – 2 tied	Swisher Gymnasium (100); Jacksonville, FL
January 11, 2024; 7:00 p.m., ESPN+		at Queens	W 54–52	5–11 (1–2)	19 – Battle	11 – Craig	2 – 3 tied	Curry Arena (119); Charlotte, NC
January 13, 2024; 2:00 p.m., ESPN+		at Kennesaw State	L 57–59	5–12 (1–3)	20 – Battle	8 – Craig	3 – Telleria	KSU Convocation Center (629); Kennesaw, GA
January 25, 2024; 6:30 p.m., ESPN+		Eastern Kentucky	L 51–59	5–13 (1–4)	12 – 2 tied	9 – Craig	2 – Battle	Swisher Gymnasium (350); Jacksonville, FL
January 27, 2024; 2:00 p.m., ESPN+		Bellarmine	W 87–69	6–13 (2–4)	31 – Battle	10 – Craig	4 – Battle	Swisher Gymnasium (200); Jacksonville, FL
February 1, 2024; 6:00 p.m., ESPN+		at Central Arkansas	L 58–71	6–14 (2–5)	25 – Battle	7 – Craig	1 – 3 tied	Farris Center (427); Conway, AR
February 3, 2024; 6:00 p.m., ESPN+		at North Alabama	L 67–77	6–15 (2–6)	19 – Battle	7 – Craig	4 – Battle	CB&S Bank Arena (1,304); Florence, AL
February 7, 2024; 6:30 p.m., ESPN+		Lipscomb	L 52–58	6–16 (2–7)	14 – Dunlap	13 – Craig	3 – Battle	Swisher Gymnasium (161); Jacksonville, FL
February 10, 2024; 2:00 p.m., ESPN+		at Austin Peay	L 69–75	6–17 (2–8)	29 – Battle	10 – Craig	4 – Battle	F&M Bank Arena (1,692); Clarksville, TN
February 15, 2024; 7:00 p.m., ESPN+		at North Florida	W 77–60	7–17 (3–8)	19 – Battle	8 – Jones	3 – 2 tied	UNF Arena (456); Jacksonville, FL
February 17, 2024; 2:00 p.m., ESPN+		North Florida	W 73–60	8–17 (4–8)	22 – Battle	9 – Craig	4 – Battle	Swisher Gymnasium (317); Jacksonville, FL
February 22, 2024; 6:30 p.m., ESPN+		Kennesaw State	W 70–59	9–17 (5–8)	28 – Battle	15 – Craig	4 – Battle	Swisher Gymnasium (245); Jacksonville, FL
February 24, 2024; 2:00 p.m., ESPN+		Queens	W 79–66	10–17 (6–8)	24 – Battle	9 – Craig	4 – Battle	Swisher Gymnasium (200); Jacksonville, FL
February 29, 2024; 7:00 p.m., ESPN+		at Stetson	L 51–55	10–18 (6–9)	19 – Battle	7 – 2 tied	3 – Battle	Edmunds Center (268); DeLand, FL
March 2, 2024; 7:00 p.m., ESPN+		at Florida Gulf Coast	L 55–80	10–19 (6–10)	20 – Battle	4 – Craig	3 – Garrett	Alico Arena (1,814); Fort Myers, FL
ASUN tournament
March 8, 2024; 6:00 p.m., ESPN+	(9)	vs. (10) Bellarmine; First round	W 79–62	11–19	24 – Battle	9 – Dunlap	4 – Garrett	Alico Arena (117); Fort Meyers, FL
March 9, 2024; 6:00 p.m., ESPN+	(9)	at (1) Florida Gulf Coast; Quarterfinals	L 69–76	11–20	33 – Battle	7 – Craig	5 – Dunlap	Alico Arena (1,261); Fort Meyers, FL
*Non-conference game. ^{#}Rankings from AP poll. (#) Tournament seedings in parentheses. All times are in Eastern.
