= 2023–24 Eastern Kentucky Colonels women's basketball team =

American college basketball season

2023–24 Eastern Kentucky Colonels women's basketball

WNIT, first round
- Conference: ASUN Conference
- Record: 22–12 (9–7 ASUN)
- Head coach: Greg Todd (3rd season)
- Assistant coaches: Coretta Brown; Veronica Ryan; Chad Gibney; Brie Wajer
- Home arena: Baptist Health Arena

2023–24 ASUN women's basketball standings
	Conf.				Overall
Team	W		L	PCT	W		L	PCT
Florida Gulf Coast †	16	–	0	1.000	29	–	5	.853
Stetson	12	–	4	.750	17	–	15	.531
Central Arkansas	11	–	5	.688	21	–	12	.636
Lipscomb	10	–	6	.625	17	–	13	.567
Eastern Kentucky	9	–	7	.563	22	–	12	.647
North Alabama	8	–	8	.500	12	–	18	.400
Austin Peay	8	–	8	.500	17	–	16	.515
Kennesaw State	7	–	9	.438	11	–	19	.367
Jacksonville	6	–	10	.375	11	–	20	.355
Bellarmine*	5	–	11	.313	10	–	19	.345
North Florida	3	–	13	.188	9	–	21	.300
Queens*	1	–	15	.063	7	–	22	.241
† 2024 ASUN tournament winner *Ineligible for the 2024 NCAA tournament due to transition from Division II

The 2023–24 Eastern Kentucky Colonels women's basketball team represented Eastern Kentucky University during the 2023–24 NCAA Division I women's basketball season. The Colonels, led by third-year head coach Greg Todd, played their home games at Baptist Health Arena in Richmond, Kentucky as members of the ASUN Conference.

The Colonels finished the season 22–12, 9–7 in ASUN play, to finish in fifth place. They defeated Lipscomb in the quarterfinals of the ASUN tournament before falling to Central Arkansas in the semifinals. They received an at-large bid into the WNIT, where they fell to Purdue Fort Wayne in the first round.

== Previous season ==
The Colonels finished the 2022–23 season 18–14, 11–7 in ASUN play, to finish in fifth place. As the #5 seed in the ASUN tournament, they were defeated by #4 seed Austin Peay in the quarterfinals.

== Roster ==
2023–24 Eastern Kentucky Colonels women's basketball team
Players
Coaches

Pos.	#	Name	Height	Year	Previous school	Hometown
G	1	Saniyah Shelton	5 ft 10 in (1.78 m)	Fr	Bowling Green High School	Central City, KY
G	2	Ivy Turner	5 ft 4 in (1.63 m)	GS	Northern Kentucky	Danville, KY
G	3	Brie Crittendon	5 ft 10 in (1.78 m)	RS So	Ryle High School	Union, KY
F	5	Raphaela Toussaint	6 ft 0 in (1.83 m)	Sr	Rider	Kingston, ON
G	10	NeKiyah Thompson	5 ft 6 in (1.68 m)	Sr	Jacksonville State	Atlanta, GA
G	11	Althea Kara Angeles	5 ft 6 in (1.68 m)	Sr	Old Dominion	Melbourne, Australia
G	13	Antwainette Walker	5 ft 11 in (1.8 m)	GS	Marquette	Lisle, IL
F	14	Sierra McCullough	6 ft 2 in (1.88 m)	Sr	Tennessee State	Opelika, AL
G	20	Kaitlyn Costner	5 ft 8 in (1.73 m)	Jr	Ohio State	Osceola, IN
F	24	Kailani Lindsey	6 ft 1 in (1.85 m)	Fr	Foster High School	Wildwood, FL
G	30	Alice Recanati	5 ft 9 in (1.75 m)	Sr	Team 86 Villasanta	Bergamo, Italy
F	32	Jasmine McGinnis-Taylor	6 ft 3 in (1.91 m)	Sr	Illinois State	Omaha, NE
F	53	Bridgid Fox	6 ft 0 in (1.83 m)	Sr	Detroit Mercy	Altoona, PA

Head coach

- Greg Todd (Eastern Kentucky)

Assistant coach(es)

- Coretta Brown (North Carolina)
- Veronica Ryan (Georgia College)
- Chad Gibney (Wichita State)
- Brie Wajer (Villanova)

Legend

- (C) Team captain
- (S) Suspended
- (I) Ineligible
- (W) Walk-on
- Injured
- Current redshirt

Roster
Last update: December 25, 2023

== Schedule and results ==
Date time, TV	Rank^{#}	Opponent^{#}	Result	Record	High points	High rebounds	High assists	Site (attendance) city, state
Exhibition
November 2, 2023*; 7:00 p.m.		Transylvania	W 65–42	–	–	–	–	Baptist Health Arena; Richmond, KY
Regular season
November 6, 2023*; 7:00 p.m., ESPN+		Hanover College	W 94–43	1–0	19 – Recanati	10 – McCullough	5 – 2 tied	Baptist Health Arena (608); Richmond, KY
November 9, 2023*; 6:00 p.m., ESPN+		at SIU Edwardsville	W 74–72	2–0	16 – Turner	14 – McCullough	4 – 2 tied	First Community Arena (473); Edwardsville, IL
November 11, 2023*; 2:00 p.m., ESPN+		Northern Kentucky	W 86–75	3–0	28 – Recanati	16 – McCullough	8 – Turner	Baptist Health Arena; Richmond, KY
November 15, 2023*; 7:00 p.m., ESPN+		at Evansville	W 77–75	4–0	38 – Walker	7 – 2 tied	6 – Recanati	Meeks Family Fieldhouse (323); Evansville, IN
November 18, 2023*; 9:15 p.m., YouTube		vs. UAB; Great Alaska Shootout semifinals	W 68–64	5–0	20 – Walker	15 – McCullough	10 – Recanati	Alaska Airlines Center (1,613); Anchorage, AK
November 19, 2023*; 11:30 p.m., YouTube		vs. No. 4 Utah; Great Alaska Shootout championship	L 72–117	5–1	29 – Walker	4 – 2 tied	9 – Turner	Alaska Airlines Center (2,329); Anchorage, AK
November 25, 2023*; 4:00 p.m., ESPN+		Campbellsville–Harrodsburg	W 100–25	6–1	27 – Walker	11 – McCullough	4 – 3 tied	Baptist Health Arena (441); Richmond, KY
December 4, 2023*; 5:00 p.m., ESPN+		Simmons College	W 94–38	7–1	19 – Angeles	10 – McGinnis-Taylor	8 – Recanati	Baptist Health Arena (355); Richmond, KY
December 6, 2023*; 12:00 p.m., ESPN+		Miami (OH)	W 85–55	8–1	21 – Walker	9 – Walker	9 – Recanati	Baptist Health Arena (2,136); Richmond, KY
December 10, 2023*; 2:00 p.m., SECN+		at Tennessee	L 63–72	8–2	24 – Walker	9 – McGinnis-Taylor	5 – Recanati	Thompson–Boling Arena (7,785); Knoxville, TN
December 15, 2023*; 6:30 p.m., ESPN+		at Tennessee State	W 79–69	9–2	21 – Turner	8 – Walker	4 – Recanati	Gentry Complex (174); Nashville, TN
December 17, 2023*; 6:00 p.m., ESPN+		at Chattanooga	L 44–52	9–3	13 – Turner	10 – McCullough	1 – 5 tied	McKenzie Arena (1,322); Chattanooga, TN
December 19, 2023*; 7:30 p.m., ESPN+		at Southeast Missouri State	W 57–48	10–3	14 – Walker	8 – 2 tied	3 – 2 tied	Show Me Center (510); Cape Girardeau, MO
December 29, 2023*; 7:00 p.m., ESPN+		Samford	W 59–54	11–3	13 – McGinnis-Taylor	8 – McGinnis-Taylor	4 – Turner	Baptist Health Arena (458); Richmond, KY
January 4, 2024; 7:00 p.m., ESPN+		at Lipscomb	L 59–64	11–4 (0–1)	14 – Turner	10 – McGinnis-Taylor	4 – Recanati	Allen Arena (233); Nashville, TN
January 6, 2024; 3:00 p.m., ESPN+		at Austin Peay	L 52–62	11–5 (0–2)	20 – Walker	6 – McCullough	2 – Walker	F&M Bank Arena (1,907); Clarksville, TN
January 13, 2024; 1:00 p.m., ESPN+		at Bellarmine	W 79–66	12–5 (1–2)	21 – Walker	8 – Turner	4 – Recanati	Freedom Hall (457); Louisville, KY
January 18, 2024; 7:00 p.m., ESPN+		Central Arkansas	W 65–58	13–5 (2–2)	19 – Walker	11 – McGinnis-Taylor	4 – Recanati	Baptist Health Arena (524); Richmond, KY
January 20, 2024; 4:00 p.m., ESPN+		North Alabama	W 67–58	14–5 (3–2)	16 – Turner	10 – McGinnis-Taylor	6 – Recanati	Baptist Health Arena (1,116); Richmond, KY
January 25, 2024; 6:30 p.m., ESPN+		at Jacksonville	W 59–51	15–5 (4–2)	17 – Walker	11 – Recanati	4 – Turner	Swisher Gymnasium (350); Jacksonville, FL
January 27, 2024; 2:00 p.m., ESPN+		at North Florida	W 79–56	16–5 (5–2)	17 – Walker	7 – Turner	5 – Recanati	UNF Arena (467); Jacksonville, FL
January 31, 2024; 7:00 p.m., ESPN+		Stetson	L 62–65	16–6 (5–3)	16 – Walker	6 – Recanati	4 – Turner	Baptist Health Arena (813); Richmond, KY
February 3, 2024; 7:00 p.m., ESPN+		at Florida Gulf Coast	L 69–82	16–7 (5–4)	18 – Walker	8 – McCullough	6 – Recanati	Alico Arena (1,804); Fort Myers, FL
February 8, 2024; 7:00 p.m., ESPN+		Queens	W 88–67	17–7 (6–4)	17 – Walker	13 – McGinnis-Taylor	4 – Turner	Baptist Health Arena (351); Richmond, KY
February 10, 2024; 4:00 p.m., ESPN+		Kennesaw State	W 69–66	18–7 (7–4)	19 – Walker	8 – McGinnis-Taylor	7 – Turner	Baptist Health Arena (781); Richmond, KY
February 15, 2024; 6:30 p.m., ESPN+		at North Alabama	W 84–57	19–7 (8–4)	21 – Walker	12 – Walker	4 – Costner	CB&S Bank Arena (1,142); Florence, AL
February 17, 2024; 2:00 p.m., ESPN+		at Central Arkansas	L 49–83	19–8 (8–5)	15 – McCullough	8 – McCullough	2 – Costner	Farris Center (434); Conway, AR
February 20, 2024*; 8:00 p.m., ESPN+		at Chicago State	W 85–63	20–8	13 – Costner	11 – McCullough	8 – Recanati	Jones Convocation Center (313); Chicago, IL
February 24, 2024; 4:00 p.m., ESPN+		Bellarmine	W 72–67	21–8 (9–5)	22 – Walker	11 – McGinnis-Taylor	7 – Costner	Baptist Health Arena (611); Richmond, KY
February 29, 2024; 7:00 p.m., ESPN+		Austin Peay	L 55–63	21–9 (9–6)	18 – Turner	6 – McCullough	4 – Recanati	Baptist Health Arena (470); Richmond, KY
March 2, 2024; 1:00 p.m., ESPN+		Lipscomb	L 68–71	21–10 (9–7)	21 – Walker	9 – 2 tied	4 – Turner	Baptist Health Arena (811); Richmond, KY
ASUN tournament
March 9, 2024; 5:00 p.m., ESPN+	(5)	at (4) Lipscomb; Quarterfinals	W 99–68	22–10	20 – Walker	10 – Walker	5 – Recanati	Allen Arena (276); Nashville, TN
March 12, 2024; 7:30 p.m., ESPN+	(5)	at (3) Central Arkansas; Semifinals	L 57–68	22–11	19 – Walker	14 – McGinnis-Taylor	2 – 2 tied	Farris Center (1,845); Conway, AR
WNIT
March 20, 2024*; 7:00 p.m.		at Purdue Fort Wayne; First round	L 75–83	22–12	20 – 2 tied	8 – McGinnis-Taylor	3 – 2 tied	Hilliard Gates Sports Center (559); Fort Wayne, IN
*Non-conference game. ^{#}Rankings from AP poll. (#) Tournament seedings in parentheses. All times are in Eastern.
