= 2023–24 Bellarmine Knights women's basketball team =

American college basketball season

2023–24 Bellarmine Knights women's basketball
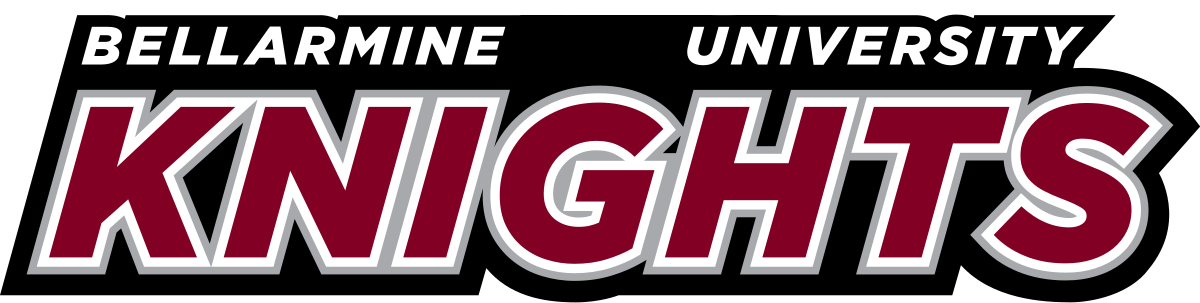
- Conference: ASUN Conference
- Record: 10–19 (5–11 ASUN)
- Head coach: Chancellor Dugan (12th season)
- Assistant coaches: Shannon Litton; Raven Merriweather; Monique Reid
- Home arena: Freedom Hall

2023–24 ASUN women's basketball standings
	Conf.				Overall
Team	W		L	PCT	W		L	PCT
Florida Gulf Coast †	16	–	0	1.000	29	–	5	.853
Stetson	12	–	4	.750	17	–	15	.531
Central Arkansas	11	–	5	.688	21	–	12	.636
Lipscomb	10	–	6	.625	17	–	13	.567
Eastern Kentucky	9	–	7	.563	22	–	12	.647
North Alabama	8	–	8	.500	12	–	18	.400
Austin Peay	8	–	8	.500	17	–	16	.515
Kennesaw State	7	–	9	.438	11	–	19	.367
Jacksonville	6	–	10	.375	11	–	20	.355
Bellarmine*	5	–	11	.313	10	–	19	.345
North Florida	3	–	13	.188	9	–	21	.300
Queens*	1	–	15	.063	7	–	22	.241
† 2024 ASUN tournament winner *Ineligible for the 2024 NCAA tournament due to transition from Division II

The 2023–24 Bellarmine Knights women's basketball team represented Bellarmine University during the 2023–24 NCAA Division I women's basketball season. The Knights, led by 12th-year head coach Chancellor Dugan, played their home games at Freedom Hall in Louisville, Kentucky as members of the ASUN Conference. They finished the season 10–19, 5–11 in ASUN play, to finish in tenth place.

The Knights were in the final year of a four-year transition from Division II to Division I, meaning this was the final season that they were ineligible for the NCAA tournament.

== Previous season ==
The Knights finished the 2022–23 season 9–22, 5–13 in ASUN play, to finish in a tie for 11th place. They failed to qualify for the ASUN tournament, as only the top 10 teams qualify.

== Roster ==
2023–24 Bellarmine Knights women's basketball team
Players
Coaches

Pos.	#	Name	Height	Year	Previous school	Hometown
G	0	Miyah Brown	5 ft 10 in (1.78 m)	So	Winnebago High School	Rockford, IL
G	4	Hope Sivori	5 ft 5 in (1.65 m)	Jr	Western Kentucky	Louisville, KY
G	5	Ashlee Harris	5 ft 6 in (1.68 m)	RS Sr	Sacred Heart Academy	Louisville, KY
F	12	Paetynn Gray	6 ft 2 in (1.88 m)	So	Monroe College	Austin, TX
F	14	Lucy Robertson	6 ft 3 in (1.91 m)	Sr	North Harrison High School	Crandall, IN
G	15	Claire Knies	5 ft 10 in (1.78 m)	Sr	Jasper High School	Jasper, IN
G	22	Jayla Butler	5 ft 5 in (1.65 m)	So	Milwaukee School of Languages	Milwaukee, WI
G	23	Hayley Harrison	5 ft 10 in (1.78 m)	RS Jr	UT Martin	Winchester, KY
G	24	Mackenzie Keelin	6 ft 1 in (1.85 m)	RS Sr	Tennessee Tech	Owensboro, KY
G	33	Aly Avrach	5 ft 8 in (1.73 m)	So	Spanish River Community High School	Boca Raton, FL
F	34	Cam Browning	6 ft 3 in (1.91 m)	Sr	Belmont	Louisville, KY
C	44	Gracie Merkle	6 ft 6 in (1.98 m)	So	Bullitt East High School	Mount Washington, KY

Head coach

- Chancellor Dugan (Eastern Kentucky)

Assistant coach(es)

- Shannon Litton (Morehead State)
- Raven Merriweather (Bellarmine)
- Monique Reid (Louisville)

Legend

- (C) Team captain
- (S) Suspended
- (I) Ineligible
- (W) Walk-on
- Injured
- Current redshirt

Roster
Last update: December 29, 2023

== Schedule and results ==
Date time, TV	Rank^{#}	Opponent^{#}	Result	Record	High points	High rebounds	High assists	Site (attendance) city, state
Exhibition
October 29, 2023*; 1:00 p.m.		Spalding	W 83–36	–	12 – 4 tied	8 – Gray	6 – Brown	Freedom Hall (481); Louisville, KY
Non-conference regular season
November 9, 2023*; 5:00 p.m.		at San Jose State	L 65–81	0–1	23 – Harrison	6 – 2 tied	1 – 6 tied	Provident Credit Union Event Center (847); San Jose, CA
November 12, 2023*; 5:00 p.m.		at No. 4 UCLA	L 64–113	0–2	23 – Knies	6 – Gray	8 – Sivori	Pauley Pavilion (1,625); Los Angeles, CA
November 16, 2023*; 7:00 p.m., ACCNX		at No. 19 Louisville	L 33–111	0–3	10 – Harrison	5 – Gray	2 – Sivori	KFC Yum! Center (7,486); Louisville, KY
November 21, 2023*; 7:00 p.m., ESPN+		at Murray State	L 78–108	0–4	16 – Harrison	5 – 2 tied	4 – Sivori	CFSB Center (869); Murray, KY
November 29, 2023*; 7:00 p.m., ESPN+		at Evansville	W 64–58	1–4	15 – Browning	9 – Browning	5 – Sivori	Meeks Family Fieldhouse (410); Evansville, IN
December 2, 2023*; 2:00 p.m., ESPN+		at Wofford	W 61–59	2–4	15 – Harrison	11 – Gray	5 – Sivori	Jerry Richardson Indoor Stadium (323); Spartanburg, SC
December 6, 2023*; 6:30 p.m., ESPN+		Purdue Fort Wayne	L 46–57	2–5	10 – 2 tied	7 – Brown	4 – 2 tied	Freedom Hall (400); Louisville, KY
December 9, 2023*; 1:00 p.m., ESPN+		Asbury	W 90–65	3–5	20 – Harrison	10 – Brown	8 – Brown	Freedom Hall (673); Louisville, KY
December 14, 2023*; 6:30 p.m., ESPN+		Campbellsville–Harrodsburg	W 95–44	4–5	20 – Gray	12 – Gray	6 – 2 tied	Freedom Hall (350); Louisville, KY
December 18, 2023*; 6:30 p.m., ESPN+		Detroit Mercy	L 49–59	4–6	21 – Sivori	8 – Gray	5 – Harrison	Freedom Hall (252); Louisville, KY
December 21, 2023*; 4:00 p.m., ESPN+		at Akron	L 65–88	4–7	30 – Harrison	9 – Harrison	5 – Gray	James A. Rhodes Arena; Akron, OH
December 30, 2023*; 1:00 p.m., ESPN+		Ohio	W 70–66	5–7	18 – Brown	8 – Brown	9 – Sivori	Freedom Hall (572); Louisville, KY
ASUN regular season
January 4, 2024; 7:00 p.m., ESPN+		at Austin Peay	L 63–65	5–8 (0–1)	15 – Harrison	8 – Sivori	6 – Sivori	F&M Bank Arena (1,411); Clarksville, TN
January 6, 2024; 3:00 p.m., ESPN+		at Lipscomb	L 65–76	5–9 (0–2)	15 – Harrison	10 – Browning	5 – Harrison	Allen Arena (327); Nashville, TN
January 13, 2024; 1:00 p.m., ESPN+		Eastern Kentucky	L 66–79	5–10 (0–3)	18 – Harris	7 – 2 tied	6 – Sivori	Freedom Hall (457); Louisville, KY
January 18, 2024; 6:30 p.m., ESPN+		North Alabama	L 90–91 ^{OT}	5–11 (0–4)	26 – Sivori	11 – Brown	6 – Harris	Freedom Hall (273); Louisville, KY
January 20, 2024; 1:00 p.m., ESPN+		Central Arkansas	L 59–73	5–12 (0–5)	18 – Sivori	8 – Browning	2 – 2 tied	Freedom Hall (483); Louisville, KY
January 25, 2024; 7:00 p.m., ESPN+		at North Florida	W 69–63	6–12 (1–5)	21 – Harrison	9 – 2 tied	3 – Sivori	UNF Arena (346); Jacksonville, FL
January 27, 2024; 2:00 p.m., ESPN+		at Jacksonville	L 69–87	6–13 (1–6)	26 – Harrison	6 – Browning	5 – Sivori	Swisher Gymnasium (200); Jacksonville, FL
January 31, 2024; 6:30 p.m., ESPN+		Florida Gulf Coast	L 55–72	6–14 (1–7)	17 – Brown	7 – Butler	6 – Sivori	Freedom Hall (362); Louisville, KY
February 3, 2024; 2:00 p.m., ESPN+		at Stetson	W 64–52	7–14 (2–7)	15 – Sivori	11 – Harrison	4 – Brown	Edmunds Center (267); DeLand, FL
February 8, 2024; 6:30 p.m., ESPN+		Kennesaw State	L 75–85	7–15 (2–8)	26 – Harrison	8 – Brown	4 – 2 tied	Freedom Hall (514); Louisville, KY
February 10, 2024; 1:00 p.m., ESPN+		Queens	W 85–76	8–15 (3–8)	21 – Harrison	10 – Browning	6 – Sivori	Freedom Hall (424); Louisville, KY
February 15, 2024; 6:00 p.m., ESPN+		at Central Arkansas	L 57–63	8–16 (3–9)	19 – Harrison	9 – Brown	4 – Sivori	Farris Center (412); Conway, AR
February 17, 2024; 6:00 p.m., ESPN+		at North Alabama	L 66–88	8–17 (3–10)	16 – Brown	8 – Butler	5 – Sivori	CB&S Bank Arena (1,496); Florence, AL
February 24, 2024; 4:00 p.m., ESPN+		at Eastern Kentucky	L 67–72	8–18 (3–11)	19 – Harrison	6 – 3 tied	4 – Sivori	Baptist Health Arena (611); Richmond, KY
February 29, 2024; 6:30 p.m., ESPN+		Lipscomb	W 80–74	9–18 (4–11)	23 – Sivori	14 – Browning	4 – Sivori	Freedom Hall (263); Louisville, KY
March 2, 2024; 1:00 p.m., ESPN+		Austin Peay	W 76–71	10–18 (5–11)	21 – Brown	10 – Browning	5 – Sivori	Freedom Hall (458); Louisville, KY
ASUN tournament
March 8, 2024; 6:00 p.m., ESPN+		at Jacksonville; First round	L 62–79	10–19	17 – Harrison	13 – Browning	5 – Sivori	Swisher Gymnasium (117); Jacksonville, FL
*Non-conference game. ^{#}Rankings from AP poll. (#) Tournament seedings in parentheses. All times are in Eastern.
