= 2023–24 North Alabama Lions women's basketball team =

American college basketball season

2023–24 North Alabama Lions women's basketball
- Conference: ASUN Conference
- Record: 12–18 (8–8 ASUN)
- Head coach: Missy Tiber (11th season)
- Assistant coaches: Adrianne Harlow; Josh Ashley; Kenysha Coulson
- Home arena: CB&S Bank Arena

2023–24 ASUN women's basketball standings
	Conf.				Overall
Team	W		L	PCT	W		L	PCT
Florida Gulf Coast †	16	–	0	1.000	29	–	5	.853
Stetson	12	–	4	.750	17	–	15	.531
Central Arkansas	11	–	5	.688	21	–	12	.636
Lipscomb	10	–	6	.625	17	–	13	.567
Eastern Kentucky	9	–	7	.563	22	–	12	.647
North Alabama	8	–	8	.500	12	–	18	.400
Austin Peay	8	–	8	.500	17	–	16	.515
Kennesaw State	7	–	9	.438	11	–	19	.367
Jacksonville	6	–	10	.375	11	–	20	.355
Bellarmine*	5	–	11	.313	10	–	19	.345
North Florida	3	–	13	.188	9	–	21	.300
Queens*	1	–	15	.063	7	–	22	.241
† 2024 ASUN tournament winner *Ineligible for the 2024 NCAA tournament due to transition from Division II

The 2023–24 North Alabama Lions women's basketball team represented the University of North Alabama during the 2023–24 NCAA Division I women's basketball season. The Lions, led by 11th-year head coach Missy Tiber, played their home games at the CB&S Bank Arena located in Florence, Alabama, as members of the Atlantic Sun Conference (ASUN).

== Previous season ==
The Lions finished the 2022–23 season 15–15, 10–8 in ASUN play, to finish in a tie for sixth place. As the #6 seed in the ASUN tournament, they were defeated by #3 seed Lipscomb in the quarterfinals.

== Roster ==
2023–24 North Alabama Lions women's basketball team
Players
Coaches

Pos.	#	Name	Height	Year	Previous school	Hometown
F	0	Cameron Jones	6 ft 2 in (1.88 m)	So	St. Vincent–St. Mary High School	Broadview Heights, OH
G	1	Emma Kate Tittle	5 ft 7 in (1.7 m)	So	Deshler High School	Tuscumbia, AL
F	3	Ruth Balogun	5 ft 10 in (1.78 m)	Sr	Central Arkansas	Lagos, Nigeria
G	5	Sara Wohlgemuth	5 ft 4 in (1.63 m)	Sr	Florida Southern	Madison, CT
G	10	Emily Jones	6 ft 0 in (1.83 m)	Sr	Christian Brothers	Jackson, TN
G	11	Veronaye Charlton	5 ft 4 in (1.63 m)	Fr	Norcross High School	Nassau, Bahamas
F	12	Allie Craig Cruce	6 ft 1 in (1.85 m)	GS	Alabama	Killen, Alabama
G	13	Katie Criswell	5 ft 10 in (1.78 m)	Fr	Lawrence County High School	Lawrence County, TN
G	15	Alexis Callins	5 ft 8 in (1.73 m)	Sr	Westview High School	Martin, TN
G	20	Olivia Jones	5 ft 10 in (1.78 m)	Jr	University School of Jackson	Jackson, TN
G	21	Rhema Pegues	5 ft 8 in (1.73 m)	So	Olive Branch High School	Olive Branch, MS
F	22	India Howard	6 ft 0 in (1.83 m)	So	Johnson C. Smith	Coppell, TX
G	23	Alyssa Clutter	5 ft 9 in (1.75 m)	So	Trinity High School	Washington, PA
G	24	Chloe Siegel	5 ft 7 in (1.7 m)	Fr	Deshler High School	Tuscumbia, AL

Head coach

- Missy Tiber (West Liberty)

Assistant coach(es)

- Adrianne Harlow (West Liberty)
- Josh Ashley (Tarleton State)
- Kenysha Coulson (North Alabama)

Legend

- (C) Team captain
- (S) Suspended
- (I) Ineligible
- (W) Walk-on
- Injured
- Current redshirt

Roster
Last update: December 30, 2023

== Schedule and results ==
Date time, TV	Rank^{#}	Opponent^{#}	Result	Record	High points	High rebounds	High assists	Site (attendance) city, state
Non-conference regular season
November 6, 2023*; 5:30 p.m., ESPN+		Tennessee Southern	W 90–47	1–0	12 – 3 tied	7 – Howard	6 – Wohlgemuth	CB&S Bank Arena (579); Florence, AL
November 10, 2023*; 6:00 p.m., ESPN+		Denver	L 51–67	1–1	10 – Callins	6 – Clutter	4 – Wohlgemuth	CB&S Bank Arena (1,072); Florence, AL
November 14, 2023*; 7:00 p.m., SECN+		at Missouri	L 72–83	1–2	15 – Siegel	5 – 2 tied	10 – Wohlgemuth	Mizzou Arena (3,667); Columbia, MO
November 18, 2023*; 5:00 p.m., ESPN+		Southern Miss	L 63–91	1–3	19 – Callins	6 – Pegues	4 – Wohlgemuth	CB&S Bank Arena; Florence, AL
November 21, 2023*; 6:00 p.m., ESPN+		UT Martin	W 70–63	2–3	27 – Callins	6 – Pegues	8 – Wohlgemuth	CB&S Bank Arena (1,063); Florence, AL
November 26, 2023*; 3:00 p.m., ESPN+		at UTEP	L 88–95	2–4	23 – Callins	8 – Clutter	10 – Charlton	Don Haskins Center (1,111); El Paso, TX
November 29, 2023*; 11:00 am		at Alabama A&M	L 57–70	2–5	14 – 2 tied	6 – Wohlgemuth	5 – Wohlgemuth	Alabama A&M Events Center (1,157); Huntsville, AL
December 5, 2023*; 6:00 p.m., ESPN+		Fisk	W 95–60	3–5	18 – Clutter	10 – Clutter	8 – Charlton	CB&S Bank Arena (1,007); Florence, AL
December 9, 2023*; 1:00 p.m., ESPN+		at Chattanooga	L 65–68	3–6	18 – Callins	8 – Wohlgemuth	7 – Wohlgemuth	McKenzie Arena (1,233); Chattanooga, TN
December 14, 2023*; 7:00 p.m., ESPN+		at Arkansas State	L 78–82 ^{OT}	3–7	25 – Callins	10 – Howard	7 – Wohlgemuth	First National Bank Arena (836); Jonesboro, AR
December 19, 2023*; 1:00 p.m., ESPN+		at Samford	W 69–64	4–7	16 – Callins	9 – Wohlgemuth	6 – Wohlgemuth	Pete Hanna Center (376); Homewood, AL
December 21, 2023*; 6:00 p.m., ESPN+		Tennessee Tech	L 67–78	4–8	25 – Charlton	7 – Clutter	4 – 2 tied	CB&S Bank Arena (1,187); Florence, AL
December 31, 2023*; 2:00 p.m., SECN+		at Auburn	L 58–79	4–9	16 – Clutter	7 – Jones, C.	3 – 2 tied	Neville Arena (2,422); Auburn, AL
ASUN regular season
January 6, 2024; 5:00 p.m., ESPN+		Central Arkansas	L 62–83	4–10 (0–1)	13 – Clutter	10 – Clutter	4 – Wohlgemuth	CB&S Bank Arena (1,272); Florence, AL
January 11, 2024; 5:30 p.m., ESPN+		Austin Peay	W 79–75	5–10 (1–1)	27 – Cruce	7 – 3 tied	8 – Wohlgemuth	CB&S Bank Arena (1,165); Florence, AL
January 13, 2024; 5:00 p.m., ESPN+		Lipscomb	L 67–85	5–11 (1–2)	16 – Cruce	4 – 2 tied	9 – Wohlgemuth	CB&S Bank Arena (1,392); Florence, AL
January 18, 2024; 5:30 p.m., ESPN+		at Bellarmine	W 91–90	6–11 (2–2)	23 – Clutter	11 – Clutter	4 – Clutter	Freedom Hall (273); Louisville, KY
January 20, 2024; 3:00 p.m., ESPN+		at Eastern Kentucky	L 58–67	6–12 (2–3)	15 – Callins	6 – Pegues	3 – Cruce	Baptist Health Arena (1,116); Richmond, KY
January 24, 2024; 6:00 p.m., ESPN+		Kennesaw State	W 79–60	7–12 (3–3)	20 – Callins	9 – Charlton	5 – Charlton	CB&S Bank Arena (1,032); Florence, AL
January 27, 2024; 1:00 p.m., ESPN+		at Queens	W 75–71	8–12 (4–3)	23 – Callins	7 – Pegues	5 – Charlton	Curry Arena (132); Charlotte, NC
February 1, 2024; 5:30 p.m., ESPN+		North Florida	W 60–51	9–12 (5–3)	18 – Charlton	6 – Charlton	6 – Charlton	CB&S Bank Arena (1,117); Florence, AL
February 3, 2024; 5:00 p.m., ESPN+		Jacksonville	W 77–67	10–12 (6–3)	17 – Callins	12 – Cruce	6 – Wohlgemuth	CB&S Bank Arena (1,304); Florence, AL
February 8, 2024; 10:00 am, ESPN+		at Stetson	L 55–62	10–13 (6–4)	15 – Cruce	10 – Cruce	2 – 2 tied	Edmunds Center (732); DeLand, FL
February 10, 2024; 3:00 p.m., ESPN+		at Florida Gulf Coast	L 42–84	10–14 (6–5)	7 – 2 tied	9 – Charlton	4 – Wohlgemuth	Alico Arena (1,821); Fort Myers, FL
February 15, 2024; 5:30 p.m., ESPN+		Eastern Kentucky	L 57–84	10–15 (6–6)	14 – Cruce	7 – Pegues	3 – 2 tied	CB&S Bank Arena (1,142); Florence, AL
February 17, 2024; 5:00 p.m., ESPN+		Bellarmine	W 88–66	11–15 (7–6)	22 – Callins	8 – Charlton	7 – Charlton	CB&S Bank Arena (1,496); Florence, AL
February 22, 2024; 6:00 p.m., ESPN+		at Lipscomb	L 53–67	11–16 (7–7)	12 – 2 tied	6 – Clutter	3 – Wohlgemuth	Allen Arena (298); Nashville, TN
February 24, 2024; 2:00 p.m., ESPN+		at Austin Peay	W 59–58	12–16 (8–7)	16 – Howard	6 – Howard	4 – Callins	F&M Bank Arena (1,963); Clarksville, TN
March 2, 2024; 1:00 p.m., ESPN+		at Central Arkansas	L 63–89	12–17 (8–8)	13 – 2 tied	4 – Howard	4 – Charlton	Farris Center (495); Conway, AR
ASUN tournament
March 9, 2024; 7:00 p.m., ESPN+	No. (6)	at No. (3) Central Arkansas; Quarterfinals	L 52–69	12–18	14 – Callins	10 – Howard	4 – Callins	Farris Center (1,110); Conway, AR
*Non-conference game. ^{#}Rankings from AP poll. (#) Tournament seedings in parentheses. All times are in Central.
