= 2023–24 Central Arkansas Sugar Bears basketball team =

American college basketball season

2023–24 Central Arkansas Sugar Bears basketball

WNIT, first round
- Conference: ASUN Conference
- Record: 21–12 (11–5 ASUN)
- Head coach: Tony Kemper (1st season)
- Assistant coaches: Kaitlynn Pacholke; Tanaeya BoClair; Hailey Estes
- Home arena: Farris Center

2023–24 ASUN women's basketball standings
	Conf.				Overall
Team	W		L	PCT	W		L	PCT
Florida Gulf Coast †	16	–	0	1.000	29	–	5	.853
Stetson	12	–	4	.750	17	–	15	.531
Central Arkansas	11	–	5	.688	21	–	12	.636
Lipscomb	10	–	6	.625	17	–	13	.567
Eastern Kentucky	9	–	7	.563	22	–	12	.647
North Alabama	8	–	8	.500	12	–	18	.400
Austin Peay	8	–	8	.500	17	–	16	.515
Kennesaw State	7	–	9	.438	11	–	19	.367
Jacksonville	6	–	10	.375	11	–	20	.355
Bellarmine*	5	–	11	.313	10	–	19	.345
North Florida	3	–	13	.188	9	–	21	.300
Queens*	1	–	15	.063	7	–	22	.241
† 2024 ASUN tournament winner *Ineligible for the 2024 NCAA tournament due to transition from Division II

The 2023–24 Central Arkansas Sugar Bears basketball team represented the University of Central Arkansas during the 2023–24 NCAA Division I women's basketball season. The Sugar Bears, led by first-year head coach Tony Kemper, played their home games at the Farris Center in Conway, Arkansas as members of the ASUN Conference.

The Sugar Bears finished the season 21–12, 11–5 in ASUN play, to finish in third place. They defeated North Alabama and Eastern Kentucky before falling to Florida Gulf Coast in the ASUN tournament championship game. They received an at-large bid to the WNIT, where they fell to eventual tournament champions Saint Louis in the first round.

== Previous season ==
The Sugar Bears finished the 2022–23 season 8–21, 3–15 in ASUN play, to finish in a tie for 13th (last) place. They failed to qualify for the ASUN tournament, as only the top 10 teams qualify.

On February 25, 2023, head coach Sandra Rushing announced that she would be stepping down as head coach after 11 years at the helm. On March 10, the school announced that Marshall head coach Tony Kemper would be named the team's new head coach.

== Roster ==
2023–24 Central Arkansas Sugar Bears women's basketball team
Players
Coaches

Pos.	#	Name	Height	Year	Previous school	Hometown
G	0	Jade Upshaw	5 ft 7 in (1.7 m)	Jr	Arkansas State	Sapulpa, OK
G	1	Kinley Fisher	5 ft 7 in (1.7 m)	Jr	Mercer	Greenwood, AR
G	2	Fatime Seck	6 ft 0 in (1.83 m)	Fr	Franklin High School	El Paso, TX
G	3	Randrea Wright	5 ft 7 in (1.7 m)	Jr	George Washington Carver High School	Birmingham, AL
G	4	Cheyanne Kemp	5 ft 8 in (1.73 m)	Fr	Morrilton High School	Morrilton, AR
F	5	Bree Stephens	6 ft 0 in (1.83 m)	Jr	Dodge City Community College	Townsville, Australia
F	12	Destine Duckworth	6 ft 0 in (1.83 m)	So	SIU Edwardsville	North Little Rock, AR
G	22	Leah Mafua	5 ft 10 in (1.78 m)	Jr	Dodge City Community College	Wellington, New Zealand
G	23	Kaidyn Beckwith	5 ft 4 in (1.63 m)	Fr	Conway High School	Conway, AR
G	24	Jenna Rose Mafua	5 ft 9 in (1.75 m)	Jr	Dodge City Community College	Wellington, New Zealand
F	30	Kierra Prim	5 ft 9 in (1.75 m)	Sr	Johnson County Community College	Overland Park, KS
F	32	Elizabeth Abiara	6 ft 2 in (1.88 m)	Fr	Lake Ridge High School	Mansfield, TX
F	42	Cheyenne Banks	6 ft 4 in (1.93 m)	Jr	Coffeyville Community College	McLoud, OK

Head coach

- Tony Kemper (Fort Hays State)

Assistant coach(es)

- Kaitlynn Pacholke (Newberry)
- Tanaeya BoClair (Utah)
- Hailey Estes (Henderson State)

Legend

- (C) Team captain
- (S) Suspended
- (I) Ineligible
- (W) Walk-on
- Injured
- Current redshirt

Roster
Last update: December 26, 2023

== Schedule and results ==
Date time, TV	Rank^{#}	Opponent^{#}	Result	Record	High points	High rebounds	High assists	Site (attendance) city, state
Non-conference regular season
November 6, 2023*; 6:30 p.m., ESPN+		Hendrix	W 85–25	1–0	14 – 2 tied	8 – 2 tied	3 – 2 tied	Farris Center (348); Conway, AR
November 11, 2023*; 2:00 p.m., ESPN+		at Samford	L 62–65	1–1	15 – L. Mafua	7 – Banks	2 – 3 tied	Pete Hanna Center (306); Homewood, AL
November 14, 2023*; 6:30 p.m., ESPN+		UT Martin	W 56–45	2–1	10 – Upshaw	14 – Banks	3 – Wright	Farris Center; Conway, AR
November 18, 2023*; 1:00 p.m., ESPN+		Northwestern State	Postponed					Farris Center; Conway, AR
November 20, 2023*; 7:00 p.m., SECN+		at Arkansas	L 67–81	2–2	16 – Upshaw	9 – Banks	3 – Upshaw	Bud Walton Arena (4,194); Fayetteville, AR
November 24, 2023*; 2:00 p.m., MidcoSN+		at Denver; Denver Classic	W 90–84	3–2	21 – Fisher	16 – Stephens	2 – 5 tied	Hamilton Gymnasium (352); Denver, CO
November 25, 2023*; 12:00 p.m., MidcoSN+		vs. Nevada; Denver Classic	L 65–67 ^{OT}	3–3	16 – Fisher	5 – Banks	2 – 3 tied	Hamilton Gymnasium; Denver, CO
November 29, 2023*; 6:00 p.m., ESPN+		at Lindenwood	W 77–64	4–3	19 – Fisher	7 – 2 tied	5 – Wright	Hyland Performance Arena (423); St. Charles, MO
December 2, 2023*; 1:00 p.m.		at Little Rock	W 63–58	5–3	16 – L. Mafua	8 – Stephens	3 – Stephens	Jack Stephens Center (657); Little Rock, AR
December 5, 2023*; 5:00 p.m., ESPN+		at Tulsa	L 58–60	5–4	18 – Fisher	10 – Abiara	3 – L. Mafua	Reynolds Center (1,050); Tulsa, OK
December 9, 2023*; 1:00 p.m., ESPN+		Central Baptist	W 69–32	6–4	12 – Upshaw	9 – 2 tied	5 – Wright	Farris Center (380); Conway, AR
December 16, 2023*; 4:00 p.m., ESPN+		at Kansas	L 48–69	6–5	17 – Wright	7 – Banks	4 – Wright	Allen Fieldhouse (2,861); Lawrence, KS
December 20, 2023*; 2:30 p.m., ESPN+		Northwestern State; Rescheduled from November 18	W 75–57	7–5	18 – L. Mafua	6 – Stephens	2 – 3 tied	Farris Center (389); Conway, AR
December 29, 2023*; 2:00 p.m.		at Alabama A&M	W 65–59	8–5	20 – Fisher	8 – Upshaw	3 – 2 tied	Alabama A&M Events Center (1,103); Huntsville, AL
ASUN regular season
January 6, 2024; 5:00 p.m., ESPN+		at North Alabama	W 83–62	9–5 (1–0)	24 – Fisher	10 – Upshaw	3 – Stephens	CB&S Bank Arena (1,272); Florence, AL
January 11, 2024; 5:00 p.m., ESPN+		Lipscomb	W 66–61	10–5 (2–0)	17 – Wright	11 – Stephens	3 – Stephens	Farris Center; Conway, AR
January 13, 2024; 1:00 p.m., ESPN+		Austin Peay	W 56–55	11–5 (3–0)	19 – Upshaw	8 – L. Mafua	5 – L. Mafua	Farris Center (853); Conway, AR
January 18, 2024; 6:00 p.m., ESPN+		at Eastern Kentucky	L 58–65	11–6 (3–1)	15 – Upshaw	9 – Stephens	4 – L. Mafua	Baptist Health Arena (524); Richmond, KY
January 20, 2024; 12:00 p.m., ESPN+		at Bellarmine	W 73–59	12–6 (4–1)	23 – Fisher	11 – Stephens	3 – Fisher	Freedom Hall (483); Louisville, KY
January 24, 2024; 6:30 p.m., ESPN+		Queens	W 76–57	13–6 (5–1)	16 – Wright	8 – Abiara	3 – Upshaw	Farris Center (478); Conway, AR
January 27, 2024; 1:00 p.m., ESPN+		at Kennesaw State	W 67–60	14–6 (6–1)	13 – 3 tied	6 – Upshaw	3 – 2 tied	KSU Convocation Center (794); Kennesaw, GA
February 1, 2024; 5:00 p.m., ESPN+		Jacksonville	W 71–58	15–6 (7–1)	18 – Upshaw	9 – Abiara	4 – 2 tied	Farris Center (427); Conway, AR
February 3, 2024; 1:00 p.m., ESPN+		North Florida	W 58–44	16–6 (8–1)	16 – Upshaw	9 – Banks	4 – Stephens	Farris Center (722); Conway, AR
February 8, 2024; 6:00 p.m., ESPN+		at Florida Gulf Coast	L 43–65	16–7 (8–2)	14 – Upshaw	5 – Stephens	1 – 5 tied	Alico Arena (1,602); Fort Myers, FL
February 10, 2024; 1:00 p.m., ESPN+		at Stetson	L 56–57	16–8 (8–3)	16 – Stephens	8 – Banks	4 – L. Mafua	Edmunds Center; DeLand, FL
February 15, 2024; 5:00 p.m., ESPN+		Bellarmine	W 63–57	17–8 (9–3)	13 – Fisher	7 – 2 tied	4 – Wright	Farris Center (412); Conway, AR
February 17, 2024; 1:00 p.m., ESPN+		Eastern Kentucky	W 83–49	18–8 (10–3)	16 – Wright	9 – Stephens	4 – L. Mafua	Farris Center (434); Conway, AR
February 22, 2024; 6:00 p.m., ESPN+		at Austin Peay	L 42–54	18–9 (10–4)	10 – L. Mafua	7 – L. Mafua	2 – L. Mafua	F&M Bank Arena (2,162); Clarksville, TN
February 24, 2024; 2:00 p.m., ESPN+		at Lipscomb	L 59–65	18–10 (10–5)	16 – Wright	10 – Abiara	2 – 3 tied	Allen Arena (276); Nashville, TN
March 2, 2024; 1:00 p.m., ESPN+		North Alabama	W 89–63	19–10 (11–5)	19 – Fisher	7 – Abiara	8 – Wright	Farris Center (495); Conway, AR
ASUN tournament
March 9, 2024; 7:00 p.m.	(3)	(6) North Alabama; Quarterfinals	W 69–52	20–10	17 – Upshaw	7 – Stephens	4 – Stephens	Farris Center (1,110); Conway, AR
March 12, 2024; 6:30 p.m., ESPN+	(3)	(5) Eastern Kentucky; Semifinals	W 68–57	21–10	17 – Fisher	10 – Banks	4 – Stephens	Farris Center (1,845); Conway, AR
March 16, 2024; 7:00 p.m., ESPN+	(3)	(1) Florida Gulf Coast; Championship	L 47–76	21–11	11 – 2 tied	8 – Upshaw	2 – 2 tied	Alico Arena (2,259); Fort Myers, FL
WNIT
March 21, 2024*; 6:30 p.m., ESPN+		Saint Louis; First round	L 61–66	21–12	17 – Upshaw	8 – Upshaw	4 – 2 tied	Farris Center (625); Conway, AR
*Non-conference game. ^{#}Rankings from AP poll. (#) Tournament seedings in parentheses. All times are in Central.
