= 2023–24 Stetson Hatters women's basketball team =

American college basketball season

2023–24 Stetson Hatters women's basketball
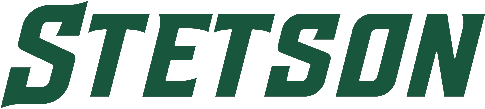

WNIT, first round
- Conference: ASUN Conference
- Record: 17–15 (12–4 ASUN)
- Head coach: Lynn Bria (14th season)
- Assistant coaches: Jama Sharp; Liberty Del Rosario; Kristina Baugh
- Home arena: Edmunds Center

2023–24 ASUN women's basketball standings
	Conf.				Overall
Team	W		L	PCT	W		L	PCT
Florida Gulf Coast †	16	–	0	1.000	29	–	5	.853
Stetson	12	–	4	.750	17	–	15	.531
Central Arkansas	11	–	5	.688	21	–	12	.636
Lipscomb	10	–	6	.625	17	–	13	.567
Eastern Kentucky	9	–	7	.563	22	–	12	.647
North Alabama	8	–	8	.500	12	–	18	.400
Austin Peay	8	–	8	.500	17	–	16	.515
Kennesaw State	7	–	9	.438	11	–	19	.367
Jacksonville	6	–	10	.375	11	–	20	.355
Bellarmine*	5	–	11	.313	10	–	19	.345
North Florida	3	–	13	.188	9	–	21	.300
Queens*	1	–	15	.063	7	–	22	.241
† 2024 ASUN tournament winner *Ineligible for the 2024 NCAA tournament due to transition from Division II

The 2023–24 Stetson Hatters women's basketball team represented Stetson University during the 2023–24 NCAA Division I women's basketball season. The Hatters, led by 14th-year head coach Lynn Bria, played their home games at the Edmunds Center located in DeLand, Florida as members of the ASUN Conference.

The Hatters finished the season 17–15, 12–4 in ASUN play, to finish in second place. They were upset by sixth-seeded Austin Peay in the quarterfinals of the ASUN tournament. They received an automatic bid into the WNIT, where they were defeated by FIU in the first round.

== Previous season ==
The Hatters finished the 2022–23 season 13–20, 6–12 in ASUN play, to finish in a tie for ninth place. As the #9 seed in the ASUN tournament, they defeated #10 seed Jacksonville in the first round, before falling to top-seeded and eventual tournament champions Florida Gulf Coast in the quarterfinals.

== Roster ==
2023–24 Stetson Hatters women's basketball team
Players
Coaches

Pos.	#	Name	Height	Year	Previous school	Hometown
G	0	Haley Stinebrickner	5 ft 7 in (1.7 m)	Jr	Southwest Academy	London, ON
G	1	Jordan Peete	5 ft 6 in (1.68 m)	Sr	Lipscomb	St. Louis, MO
G	2	Senali Moss	5 ft 7 in (1.7 m)	So	Cape Fear Community College	Charlotte, NC
F	3	Sophia Fontaine	6 ft 2 in (1.88 m)	Fr	Putnam Science Academy	Boston, MA
G	4	Jamiya Turner	5 ft 9 in (1.75 m)	RS Sr	Jones High School	Orlando, FL
G	5	Kiya Turner	5 ft 6 in (1.68 m)	GS	Middle Tennessee	St. Augustine, FL
G	10	Jorah Eppley	5 ft 9 in (1.75 m)	Fr	Catholic High School	Virginia Beach, VA
F	11	Skylar Treadwell	6 ft 1 in (1.85 m)	Sr	Seton Hall	Martinsburg, WV
G	12	Promise Keshi	5 ft 9 in (1.75 m)	So	Liceo Scientifico Manfredi Azzarita	Rubano, Italy
G	13	Anna Kunzwiler	5 ft 9 in (1.75 m)	Fr	Paul VI Catholic High School	Leesburg, VA
G	20	Diawna Carter-Hartley	6 ft 1 in (1.85 m)	Fr	Princeton High School	Cincinnati, OH
G	23	Khamya McNeal	5 ft 8 in (1.73 m)	RS Jr	Syracuse	Milwaukee, WI
F	25	Quentarra Mitchell	5 ft 9 in (1.75 m)	GS	Chicago State	Nashville, TN
G	30	Tyra Myers	5 ft 7 in (1.7 m)	So	St. Francis Brooklyn	Columbia, SC
F	33	Jaelyn Talley	6 ft 0 in (1.83 m)	So	Paul VI Catholic High School	Fairfax, VA

Head coach

- Lynn Bria (Charleston (WV))

Assistant coach(es)

- Jama Sharp (Stetson)
- Liberty Del Rosario (Notre Dame (OH))
- Kristina Baugh (Providence)

Legend

- (C) Team captain
- (S) Suspended
- (I) Ineligible
- (W) Walk-on
- Injured
- Current redshirt

Roster
Last update: December 30, 2023

== Schedule and results ==
Date time, TV	Rank^{#}	Opponent^{#}	Result	Record	High points	High rebounds	High assists	Site (attendance) city, state
Non-conference regular season
November 6, 2023*; 6:00 p.m., ESPN+		at Tulane	L 57–68	0–1	14 – Peete	7 – Talley	2 – K. Turner	Devlin Fieldhouse (1,251); New Orleans, LA
November 10, 2023*; 4:00 p.m., ESPN+		at South Florida	L 55–67	0–2	15 – McNeal	8 – Talley	2 – 2 tied	Yuengling Center (1,711); Tampa, FL
November 14, 2023*; 7:00 p.m., ESPN+		at High Point	L 54–59	0–3	19 – J. Turner	21 – Treadwell	2 – Keshi	Qubein Center (1,360); High Point, NC
November 18, 2023*; 3:00 p.m., ESPN+		Iona	W 71–62	1–3	15 – Talley	6 – J. Turner	4 – McNeal	Edmunds Center (247); DeLand, FL
November 20, 2023*; 7:00 p.m., ESPN+		at Florida Atlantic	L 39–50	1–4	10 – Keshi	8 – Talley	4 – J. Turner	Eleanor R. Baldwin Arena; Boca Raton, FL
November 24, 2023*; 1:15 p.m., FloHoops		vs. Dayton; Daytona Beach Classic	L 54–75	1–5	20 – J. Turner	4 – J. Turner	2 – J. Turner	Ocean Center (200); Daytona Beach, FL
November 25, 2023*; 3:30 p.m., FloHoops		vs. Tennessee Tech; Daytona Beach Classic	L 59–65	1–6	15 – McNeal	6 – J. Turner	1 – 5 tied	Ocean Center (200); Daytona Beach, FL
November 30, 2023*; 7:00 p.m., ESPN+		Webber International	W 83–37	2–6	14 – Kunzwiler	8 – Treadwell	4 – Mitchell	Edmunds Center (311); DeLand, FL
December 3, 2023*; 2:00 p.m., B1G+		at No. 17 Indiana	L 34–72	2–7	11 – J. Turner	6 – J. Turner	2 – Treadwell	Simon Skjodt Assembly Hall (8,789); Bloomington, IN
December 9, 2023*; 3:00 p.m.		at Denver	L 52–74	2–8	14 – J. Turner	8 – Talley	6 – McNeal	Hamilton Gymnasium (273); Denver, CO
December 17, 2023*; 2:00 p.m., ESPN+		Morgan State	W 56–48	3–8	11 – Peete	14 – Talley	3 – 3 tied	Edmunds Center (228); DeLand, FL
December 19, 2023*; 11:00 a.m., ESPN+		North Carolina A&T; Holiday Hoops Classic	L 54–57	3–9	14 – Kunzwiler	6 – 2 tied	3 – 3 tied	Edmunds Center; DeLand, FL
December 20, 2023*; 11:00 a.m., ESPN+		Valparaiso; Holiday Hoops Classic	W 78–62	4–9	17 – McNeal	8 – J. Turner	4 – J. Turner	Edmunds Center (198); DeLand, FL
December 30, 2023*; 2:00 p.m., ESPN+		Flagler	W 73–60	5–9	20 – Turner	12 – Turner	5 – 2 tied	Edmunds Center (237); DeLand, FL
ASUN regular season
January 4, 2024; 7:00 p.m., ESPN+		at North Florida	W 61–57	6–9 (1–0)	16 – Talley	8 – Turner	5 – Turner	UNF Arena (329); Jacksonville, FL
January 6, 2024; 2:00 p.m., ESPN+		at Jacksonville	W 59–53	7–9 (2–0)	12 – McNeal	6 – Treadwell	3 – 3 tied	Swisher Gymnasium (100); Jacksonville, FL
January 13, 2024; 2:00 p.m., ESPN+		Florida Gulf Coast	L 51–66	7–10 (2–1)	14 – Turner	7 – Mitchell	4 – Treadwell	Edmunds Center (252); DeLand, FL
January 18, 2024; 7:00 p.m., ESPN+		Kennesaw State	L 48–63	7–11 (2–2)	10 – McNeal	6 – Turner	3 – Peete	Edmunds Center (296); DeLand, FL
January 20, 2024; 2:00 p.m., ESPN+		Queens	W 73–71	8–11 (3–2)	17 – Talley	9 – Turner	3 – Turner	Edmunds Center (270); DeLand, FL
January 25, 2024; 7:00 p.m., ESPN+		at Austin Peay	W 51–42	9–11 (4–2)	12 – Turner	5 – 3 tied	2 – 2 tied	F&M Bank Arena (1,632); Clarksville, TN
January 27, 2024; 3:00 p.m., ESPN+		at Lipscomb	W 67–55	10–11 (5–2)	21 – McNeal	7 – 2 tied	2 – Turner	Allen Arena (307); Nashville, TN
January 31, 2024; 7:00 p.m., ESPN+		at Eastern Kentucky	W 65–62	11–11 (6–2)	15 – Turner	7 – Talley	4 – Turner	Baptist Health Arena (813); Richmond, KY
February 3, 2024; 2:00 p.m., ESPN+		Bellarmine	L 52–62	11–12 (6–3)	11 – McNeal	9 – Talley	1 – 5 tied	Edmunds Center (267); DeLand, FL
February 8, 2024; 11:00 a.m., ESPN+		North Alabama	W 62–55	12–12 (7–3)	18 – Mitchell	9 – Mitchell	3 – Turner	Edmunds Center (732); DeLand, FL
February 10, 2024; 2:00 p.m., ESPN+		Central Arkansas	W 57–56	13–12 (8–3)	12 – Mitchell	9 – Mitchell	3 – Turner	Edmunds Center; DeLand, FL
February 15, 2024; 7:00 p.m., ESPN+		at Queens	W 62–44	14–12 (9–3)	18 – Mitchell	9 – Mitchell	4 – Peete	Curry Arena (67); Charlotte, NC
February 17, 2024; 2:00 p.m., ESPN+		at Kennesaw State	W 64–54	15–12 (10–3)	14 – Talley	7 – Mitchell	3 – 2 tied	KSU Convocation Center (812); Kennesaw, GA
February 24, 2024; 4:00 p.m., ESPN+		at Florida Gulf Coast	L 52–68	15–13 (10–4)	21 – Turner	9 – Turner	3 – Talley	Alico Arena (1,984); Fort Myers, FL
February 29, 2024; 7:00 p.m., ESPN+		Jacksonville	W 55–51	16–13 (11–4)	14 – Turner	8 – Mitchell	2 – McNeal	Edmunds Center (268); DeLand, FL
March 2, 2024; 2:00 p.m., ESPN+		North Florida	W 59–56	17–13 (12–4)	18 – Talley	10 – Talley	2 – 3 tied	Edmunds Center (431); DeLand, FL
ASUN tournament
March 9, 2024; 6:00 pm, ESPN+	(2)	(7) Austin Peay; Quarterfinals	L 45–49	17–14	15 – 2 tied	10 – Talley	2 – Treadwell	Edmunds Center (304); DeLand, FL
WNIT
March 21, 2024*; 7:00 pm, ESPN+		at FIU; First round	L 47–60	17–15	17 – Turner	6 – 2 tied	3 – Keshi	Ocean Bank Convocation Center (358); Miami, FL
*Non-conference game. ^{#}Rankings from AP poll. (#) Tournament seedings in parentheses. All times are in Eastern.
