= 2023–24 Austin Peay Governors women's basketball team =

American college basketball season

2023–24 Austin Peay Governors women's basketball
- Conference: ASUN Conference
- Record: 17–16 (8–8 ASUN)
- Head coach: Brittany Young (3rd season)
- Assistant coaches: Nicole Razor; Delmar Carey; Peggy Knight; Victoria Morris
- Home arena: F&M Bank Arena

2023–24 ASUN women's basketball standings
	Conf.				Overall
Team	W		L	PCT	W		L	PCT
Florida Gulf Coast †	16	–	0	1.000	29	–	5	.853
Stetson	12	–	4	.750	17	–	15	.531
Central Arkansas	11	–	5	.688	21	–	12	.636
Lipscomb	10	–	6	.625	17	–	13	.567
Eastern Kentucky	9	–	7	.563	22	–	12	.647
North Alabama	8	–	8	.500	12	–	18	.400
Austin Peay	8	–	8	.500	17	–	16	.515
Kennesaw State	7	–	9	.438	11	–	19	.367
Jacksonville	6	–	10	.375	11	–	20	.355
Bellarmine*	5	–	11	.313	10	–	19	.345
North Florida	3	–	13	.188	9	–	21	.300
Queens*	1	–	15	.063	7	–	22	.241
† 2024 ASUN tournament winner *Ineligible for the 2024 NCAA tournament due to transition from Division II

The 2023–24 Austin Peay Governors women's basketball team represented Austin Peay State University during the 2023–24 NCAA Division I women's basketball season. The Governors, led by third-year head coach Brittany Young, played their home games at the newly opened F&M Bank Arena located in Clarksville, Tennessee as members of the ASUN Conference.

== Previous season ==
The Governors finished the 2022–23 season 17–12, 12–6 in ASUN play to finish in fourth place. In the ASUN tournament, they defeated Eastern Kentucky in the quarterfinals, before falling to top-seeded and eventual tournament champions Florida Gulf Coast in the semifinals.

== Roster ==
2023–24 Austin Peay Governors women's basketball team
Players
Coaches

Pos.	#	Name	Height	Year	Previous school	Hometown
G	1	Sandra Lin	5 ft 4 in (1.63 m)	GS	Morehead State	Hsinchu, Taiwan
G	3	Anala Nelson	5 ft 7 in (1.7 m)	So	Lower Richland High School	Columbia, South Carolina
G	4	Alyssa Hargrove	5 ft 8 in (1.73 m)	Jr	Stetson	Huber Heights, Ohio
G	5	Abby Cater	5 ft 7 in (1.7 m)	Jr	Trinity Valley Community College	Fort Washington, Maryland
G	10	La'Nya Foster	5 ft 9 in (1.75 m)	Fr	Lovejoy High School	Riverdale, Georgia
G	11	JaNiah Newell	5 ft 5 in (1.65 m)	GS	Chicago State	Danville, Illinois
G/F	15	Cur'Tiera Haywood	5 ft 11 in (1.8 m)	GS	Quinnipiac	Yukon, Oklahoma
C	21	Shamarre Hale	6 ft 1 in (1.85 m)	GS	Wright State	Chicago, Illinois
C	22	Jeanine Brandsma	6 ft 1 in (1.85 m)	So	LIU	Éguzon-Chantôme, France
F	23	Briah Hampton	5 ft 10 in (1.78 m)	So	Arlington High School	Memphis, Tennessee
G	25	Tiya Douglas	5 ft 8 in (1.73 m)	GS	Ole Miss	Fort Smith, Arkansas
F	32	Gabby Zapata Smalls	5 ft 10 in (1.78 m)	GS	Saint Joseph's	Browns Mills, New Jersey

Head coach

- Brittany Young (Francis Marion)

Assistant coach(es)

- Nicole Razor (Elon)
- Delmar Carey (Bowie State)
- Peggy Knight (Appalachian State)
- Victoria Morris (Rutgers)

Legend

- (C) Team captain
- (S) Suspended
- (I) Ineligible
- (W) Walk-on
- Injured
- Current redshirt

Roster
Last update: December 26, 2023

== Schedule and results ==
Date time, TV	Rank^{#}	Opponent^{#}	Result	Record	High points	High rebounds	High assists	Site (attendance) city, state
Non-conference regular season
November 6, 2023*; 5:30 pm, ESPN+		Trevecca Nazarene	L 59–75	0–1	15 – Hale	6 – Hale	4 – Lin	F&M Bank Arena (1,419); Clarksville, TN
November 10, 2023*; 6:00 pm, ESPN+		Chattanooga	L 52–57	0–2	18 – Hale	9 – Nelson	2 – 3 Tied	F&M Bank Arena (571); Clarksville, TN
November 14, 2023*; 5:00 pm, SECN+		at Kentucky	W 68–63	1–2	21 – Nelson	9 – Haywood	6 – Lin	Davis-Reid Alumni Gym (935); Georgetown, KY
November 18, 2023*; 4:00 pm, FloHoops		at Butler	L 47–53	1–3	11 – Haywood	9 – Hale	4 – Lin	Hinkle Fieldhouse (1,087); Indianapolis, IN
November 22, 2023*; 3:00 pm, ESPN+		at Cleveland State; Viking Invitiational	L 57–62	1–4	17 – Hale	6 – 3 Tied	7 – Lin	Wolstein Center (418); Cleveland, OH
November 24, 2023*; 3:00 pm		vs. Kansas City; Viking Invitiational	W 78–63	2–4	13 – 2 Tied	7 – 3 Tied	7 – Nelson	Wolstein Center (380); Cleveland, OH
November 25, 2023*; 11:30 am		vs. Chicago State; Viking Invitiational	W 60–49	3–4	15 – Nelson	10 – Foster	5 – Nelson	Wolstein Center (266); Cleveland, OH
December 2, 2023*; 1:00 pm, ESPN+		at Mercer	L 75–78 ^{2OT}	3–5	19 – 2 Tied	9 – Hale	7 – Lin	Hawkins Arena (574); Macon, GA
December 9, 2023*; 4:00 pm, ESPN+		Murray State	L 85–93	3–6	27 – Cater	8 – 2 Tied	5 – Lin	F&M Bank Arena (5,458); Clarksville, TN
December 14, 2023*; 11:00 am, ESPN+		Fisk	W 72–64	4–6	18 – Haywood	5 – Douglas	6 – Nelson	F&M Bank Arena (1,371); Clarksville, TN
December 16, 2023*; 2:00 pm, ESPN+		Bryan	W 90–57	5–6	15 – Nelson	9 – Foster	7 – Lin	F&M Bank Arena (1,477); Clarksville, TN
December 20, 2023*; 1:00 pm, ESPN+		New Mexico State; APSU Christmas Tournament	W 57–55 ^{OT}	6–6	16 – Cater	7 – Hale	4 – Nelson	F&M Bank Arena (1,548); Clarksville, TN
December 21, 2023*; 2:30 pm, ESPN+		Stephen F. Austin; APSU Christmas Tournament	L 56–66	6–7	15 – 2 Tied	6 – Nelson	2 – 3 Tied	F&M Bank Arena (1,632); Clarksville, TN
December 30, 2023*; 2:00 pm, ESPN+		Miami (OH)	W 53–44	7–7	18 – Hale	8 – Hale	4 – Lin	F&M Bank Arena (1,519); Clarksville, TN
ASUN regular season
January 4, 2024; 6:00 pm, ESPN+		Bellarmine	W 65-63	8-7 (1-0)	18 – Cater	12 – Hale	5 – Nelson	F&M Bank Arena (1,411); Clarksville, TN
January 6, 2024; 2:00 pm, ESPN+		Eastern Kentucky	W 62-52	9-7 (2-0)	15 – Hale	13 – Hale	6 – Nelson	F&M Bank Arena (1,907); Clarksville, TN
January 11, 2024; 5:30 pm, ESPN+		at North Alabama	L 75-79	9-8 (2-1)	16 – Nelson	12 – Hale	9 – Nelson	CB&S Bank Arena (1,165); Florence, AL
January 13, 2024; 1:00 pm, ESPN+		at Central Arkansas	L 55-56	9-9 (2-2)	19 – Foster	5 – Nelson	4 – Nelson	Farris Center (853); Conway, AR
January 20, 2024; 2:00 pm, ESPN+		Lipscomb	L 51-61	9-10 (2-3)	16 – Hale	11 – Hale	3 – Nelson	F&M Bank Arena (3,736); Clarksville, TN
January 25, 2024; 6:00 pm, ESPN+		Stetson	L 42-51	9-11 (2-4)	14 – Nelson	12 – Hale	5 – Nelson	F&M Bank Arena (1,632); Clarksville, TN
January 27, 2024; 6:00 pm, ESPN+		Florida Gulf Coast	L 54-65	9-12 (2-5)	17 – Foster	6 – Foster	3 – Nelson	F&M Bank Arena (2,061); Clarksville, TN
February 1, 2024; 4:00 pm, ESPN+		at Kennesaw State	W 61-50	10-12 (3-5)	14 – Hale	8 – 2 Tied	5 – Nelson	KSU Convocation Center (472); Kennesaw, GA
February 3, 2024; 12:00 pm, ESPN+		at Queens	W 63-38	11-12 (4-5)	16 – Hale	9 – Foster	3 – Nelson	Curry Arena (215); Charlotte, NC
February 7, 2024; 6:00 pm, ESPN+		at North Florida	L 50-52	11-13 (4-6)	20 – Hale	6 – 2 Tied	3 – Nelson	UNF Arena (396); Jacksonville, FL
February 10, 2024; 2:00 pm, ESPN+		Jacksonville	W 75-69	12-13 (5-6)	15 – Haywood	6 – Foster	4 – Nelson	F&M Bank Arena (1,692); Clarksville, TN
February 17, 2024; 2:00 pm, ESPN+		at Lipscomb	W 73-60	13-13 (6-6)	17 – Haywood	10 – Hale	9 – Nelson	Allen Arena (373); Nashville, TN
February 22, 2024; 6:00 pm, ESPN+		Central Arkansas	W 54-42	14-13 (7-6)	17 – Hale	8 – Foster	3 – 2 Tied	F&M Bank Arena (2,162); Clarksville, TN
February 24, 2024; 2:00 pm, ESPN+		North Alabama	L 58-59	14-14 (7-7)	14 – Nelson	6 – Hale	4 – Nelson	F&M Bank Arena (1,963); Clarksville, TN
February 29, 2024; 6:00 pm, ESPN+		at Eastern Kentucky	W 63-55	15-14 (8-7)	16 – Hale	12 – Hale	3 – 2 Tied	Baptist Health Arena (470); Richmond, KY
March 2, 2024; 12:00 pm, ESPN+		at Bellarmine	L 71-76	15-15 (8-8)	24 – Foster	9 – Hale	7 – Nelson	Freedom Hall (458); Louisville, KY
ASUN tournament
March 8, 2024; 5:00 pm	(7)	(8) Kennesaw State; First Round	W 73-60	16-15	27 – Hale	12 – Hale	7 – Nelson	F&M Bank Arena (91); Clarksville, TN
March 9, 2024; 6:00 pm	(7)	at (2) Stetson; Quarterfinals	W 49-45	17-15	9 – Carter	7 – 2 Tied	2 – 3 Tied	Edmunds Center (304); DeLand, FL
March 12, 2024; 7:00 pm, ESPN+	(7)	at (1) Florida Gulf Coast; Semifinals	L 52-74	17-16	20 – Hale	8 – Hale	7 – Nelson	Alico Arena (1,487); Fort Meyers, FL
*Non-conference game. ^{#}Rankings from AP Poll. (#) Tournament seedings in parentheses. All times are in Central.
