= 2023–24 Lipscomb Bisons women's basketball team =

American college basketball season

2023–24 Lipscomb Bisons women's basketball
- Conference: ASUN Conference
- Record: 17–13 (10–6 ASUN)
- Head coach: Lauren Sumski (5th season)
- Associate head coach: Chris Sumski
- Assistant coaches: Sydney Shelton; Jacob Ogle
- Home arena: Allen Arena

2023–24 ASUN women's basketball standings
	Conf.				Overall
Team	W		L	PCT	W		L	PCT
Florida Gulf Coast †	16	–	0	1.000	29	–	5	.853
Stetson	12	–	4	.750	17	–	15	.531
Central Arkansas	11	–	5	.688	21	–	12	.636
Lipscomb	10	–	6	.625	17	–	13	.567
Eastern Kentucky	9	–	7	.563	22	–	12	.647
North Alabama	8	–	8	.500	12	–	18	.400
Austin Peay	8	–	8	.500	17	–	16	.515
Kennesaw State	7	–	9	.438	11	–	19	.367
Jacksonville	6	–	10	.375	11	–	20	.355
Bellarmine*	5	–	11	.313	10	–	19	.345
North Florida	3	–	13	.188	9	–	21	.300
Queens*	1	–	15	.063	7	–	22	.241
† 2024 ASUN tournament winner *Ineligible for the 2024 NCAA tournament due to transition from Division II

The 2023–24 Lipscomb Bisons women's basketball team represented Lipscomb University during the 2023–24 NCAA Division I women's basketball season. The Bisons, led by fifth-year head coach Lauren Sumski, played their home games at the Allen Arena in Nashville, Tennessee as members of the ASUN Conference.

The Bisons finished the season 17–13, 10–6 in ASUN play, to finish in fourth place. They were defeated by Eastern Kentucky in the quarterfinals of the ASUN tournament.

== Previous season ==
The Bisons finished the 2022–23 season 20–12, 13–5 in ASUN play, to finish in third place. In the ASUN tournament, they defeated North Alabama in the quarterfinals, before falling to Liberty in the semifinals.

== Roster ==
2023–24 Lipscomb Bisons women's basketball team
Players
Coaches

Pos.	#	Name	Height	Year	Previous school	Hometown
G	0	Olivia Vandergriff	5 ft 7 in (1.7 m)	Fr	Guntersville High School	Guntersville, AL
G	1	Claira McGowan	5 ft 7 in (1.7 m)	Jr	Murray State	Murfreesboro, TN
G	2	Elena Bertrand	5 ft 5 in (1.65 m)	Fr	Virginia Academy	Bristow, VA
G	3	Molly Heard	6 ft 0 in (1.83 m)	So	Pisgah High School	Pisgah, AL
C	4	Isabella Pitta	6 ft 3 in (1.91 m)	Fr	Lake Mills High School	Lake Mills, WI
F	5	Aleah Sorrentino	6 ft 2 in (1.88 m)	RS Jr	Ole Miss	Palm Bay, FL
G	11	Blythe Pearson	5 ft 10 in (1.78 m)	GS	Saint Thomas Aquinas High School	Overland Park, KS
F	13	Kamil Collier	6 ft 1 in (1.85 m)	So	The Ensworth School	Nashville, TN
G	14	Ainhoa Cea	5 ft 6 in (1.68 m)	So	DME Academy	Hondarribia, Spain
G/F	21	Bella Vinson	6 ft 2 in (1.88 m)	Jr	Coffee County High School	Manchester, TN
G	23	Jalyn Holcomb	5 ft 9 in (1.75 m)	GS	Riverdale High School	Murfreesboro, TN
F	32	Taylor Bowen	6 ft 0 in (1.83 m)	So	Culver Academy	Carmel, IN
C	33	Diana Saleh	6 ft 3 in (1.91 m)	Sr	Fordson High School	Dearborn, MI

Head coach

- Lauren Sumski (Rhodes College)

Assistant coach(es)

- Chris Sumski (St. Andrews)
- Sydney Shelton (Lipscomb)
- Jacob Ogle (Lipscomb)

Legend

- (C) Team captain
- (S) Suspended
- (I) Ineligible
- (W) Walk-on
- Injured
- Current redshirt

Roster
Last update: December 26, 2023

== Schedule and results ==
Date time, TV	Rank^{#}	Opponent^{#}	Result	Record	High points	High rebounds	High assists	Site (attendance) city, state
Non-conference regular season
November 7, 2023*; 6:00 p.m., ESPN+		at Evansville	W 77–58	1–0	25 – Sorrentino	8 – 2 tied	4 – Cea	Meeks Family Fieldhouse (592); Evansville, IN
November 10, 2023*; 11:00 a.m., ESPN+		Fairfield	L 66–89	1–1	16 – Vinson	9 – Sorrentino	3 – 2 tied	Allen Arena (267); Nashville, TN
November 14, 2023*; 6:00 p.m., ESPN+		Morehead State	W 77–73	2–1	21 – Pearson	6 – 2 tied	5 – Vinson	Allen Arena (123); Nashville, TN
November 17, 2023*; 5:30 p.m., ESPN+		at Tennessee State	W 74–43	3–1	14 – Sorrentino	7 – Sorrentino	4 – 2 tied	Gentry Complex (336); Nashville, TN
November 19, 2023*; 1:00 p.m., B1G+		at No. 18 Indiana	L 44–77	3–2	14 – Heard	8 – Heard	3 – Cea	Simon Skjodt Assembly Hall (8,572); Bloomington, IN
November 27, 2023*; 11:00 a.m.		at Mississippi Valley State	W 64–55	4–2	18 – Pearson	13 – Sorrentino	4 – Vinson	Harrison HPER Complex (1,265); Itta Bena, MS
November 30, 2023*; 6:00 p.m., ESPN+		at East Tennessee State	W 68–45	5–2	23 – McGowan	7 – McGowan	4 – Cea	Brooks Gymnasium (473); Johnson City, TN
December 6, 2023*; 5:00 p.m., ESPN+		Belmont; Battle of the Boulevard	L 51–70	5–3	18 – Sorrentino	7 – Pearson	6 – Cea	Curb Event Center (1,881); Nashville, TN
December 10, 2023*; 1:30 p.m., ESPN+		Johnson (TN)	W 85–49	6–3	14 – Pearson	11 – Heard	7 – Bertrand	Allen Arena (279); Nashville, TN
December 14, 2023*; 6:00 p.m., ESPN+		Chattanooga	L 62–72	6–4	15 – Heard	10 – Sorrentino	3 – Cea	Allen Arena (533); Nashville, TN
December 17, 2023*; 1:00 p.m., SECN+		at Vanderbilt	L 50–72	6–5	12 – Pearson	13 – Pearson	3 – 2 tied	Memorial Gymnasium (2,258); Nashville, TN
December 21, 2023*; 10:00 a.m., SECN+		at Kentucky	L 80–87	6–6	21 – Vinson	6 – Sorrentino	4 – Vinson	Rupp Arena (3,424); Lexington, KY
December 22, 2023*; 12:00 p.m., ESPN+		Tennessee Wesleyan	W 91–52	7–6	17 – McGowan	13 – Collier	5 – Cea	Allen Arena (233); Nashville, TN
ASUN regular season
January 4, 2024; 6:00 p.m., ESPN+		Eastern Kentucky	W 64–59	8–6 (1–0)	18 – McGowan	7 – 2 tied	4 – Pearson	Allen Arena (233); Nashville, TN
January 6, 2024; 2:00 p.m., ESPN+		Bellarmine	W 76–65	9–6 (2–0)	19 – McGowan	9 – Sorrentino	4 – Vinson	Allen Arena (327); Nashville, TN
January 11, 2024; 5:00 p.m., ESPN+		at Central Arkansas	L 61–66	9–7 (2–1)	19 – Sorrentino	16 – Sorrentino	3 – McGowan	Farris Center; Conway, AR
January 13, 2024; 5:00 p.m., ESPN+		at North Alabama	W 85–67	10–7 (3–1)	20 – 2 tied	8 – McGowan	4 – 2 tied	CB&S Bank Arena (1,392); Florence, AL
January 20, 2024; 2:00 p.m., ESPN+		at Austin Peay	W 61–51	11–7 (4–1)	15 – 2 tied	9 – Bowen	4 – 2 tied	F&M Bank Arena (3,736); Clarksville, TN
January 25, 2024; 6:00 p.m., ESPN+		Florida Gulf Coast	L 54–75	11–8 (4–2)	15 – Pearson	7 – 2 tied	4 – 2 tied	Allen Arena (521); Nashville, TN
January 27, 2024; 2:00 p.m., ESPN+		Stetson	L 55–67	11–9 (4–3)	17 – Vinson	7 – 2 tied	3 – Cea	Allen Arena (307); Nashville, TN
February 1, 2024; 4:30 p.m., ESPN+		at Queens	W 76–63	12–9 (5–3)	15 – Pearson	8 – Pearson	4 – 2 tied	Curry Arena (55); Charlotte, NC
February 3, 2024; 1:00 p.m., ESPN+		at Kennesaw State	L 59–62	12–10 (5–4)	17 – Sorrentino	14 – Sorrentino	4 – Cea	KSU Convocation Center (757); Kennesaw, GA
February 7, 2024; 5:30 p.m., ESPN+		at Jacksonville	W 58–52	13–10 (6–4)	17 – McGowan	13 – Sorrentino	7 – Cea	Swisher Gymnasium (161); Jacksonville, FL
February 10, 2024; 1:30 p.m., ESPN+		North Florida	W 94–82 ^{2OT}	14–10 (7–4)	37 – McGowan	9 – 2 tied	5 – Heard	Allen Arena (563); Nashville, TN
February 17, 2024; 2:00 p.m., ESPN+		Austin Peay	L 60–73	14–11 (7–5)	20 – McGowan	8 – Bowen	3 – Cea	Allen Arena (373); Nashville, TN
February 22, 2024; 6:00 p.m., ESPN+		North Alabama	W 67–53	15–11 (8–5)	17 – Sorrentino	13 – Bowen	4 – 2 tied	Allen Arena (298); Nashville, TN
February 24, 2024; 2:00 p.m., ESPN+		Central Arkansas	W 65–59	16–11 (9–5)	17 – Pearson	9 – 2 tied	6 – 2 tied	Allen Arena (276); Nashville, TN
February 29, 2024; 5:30 p.m., ESPN+		at Bellarmine	L 74–80	16–12 (9–6)	29 – McGowan	7 – 2 tied	3 – 2 tied	Freedom Hall (263); Louisville, KY
March 2, 2024; 12:00 p.m., ESPN+		at Eastern Kentucky	W 71–68	17–12 (10–6)	21 – Heard	10 – Pearson	3 – Pearson	Baptist Health Arena (811); Richmond, KY
ASUN tournament
March 9, 2024; 4:00 pm, ESPN+	(4)	(5) Eastern Kentucky; Quarterfinals	L 68–99	17–13	15 – Pearson	5 – McGowan	5 – Cea	Allen Arena (276); Nashville, TN
*Non-conference game. ^{#}Rankings from AP poll. (#) Tournament seedings in parentheses. All times are in Central.
