= 2023–24 Kennesaw State Owls women's basketball team =

American college basketball season

2023–24 Kennesaw State Owls women's basketball
- Conference: ASUN Conference
- Record: 11–19 (7–9 ASUN)
- Head coach: Octavia Blue (3rd season)
- Associate head coach: Keisha McClinic
- Assistant coaches: Malikah Willis; Morgan Stroman
- Home arena: KSU Convocation Center

2023–24 ASUN women's basketball standings
| | Conf. | | | | Overall |
| Team | W | | L | PCT | W | | L | PCT |
|---|---|---|---|---|---|---|---|---|
| Florida Gulf Coast † | 16 | – | 0 | 1.000 | 29 | – | 5 | .853 |
| Stetson | 12 | – | 4 | .750 | 17 | – | 15 | .531 |
| Central Arkansas | 11 | – | 5 | .688 | 21 | – | 12 | .636 |
| Lipscomb | 10 | – | 6 | .625 | 17 | – | 13 | .567 |
| Eastern Kentucky | 9 | – | 7 | .563 | 22 | – | 12 | .647 |
| North Alabama | 8 | – | 8 | .500 | 12 | – | 18 | .400 |
| Austin Peay | 8 | – | 8 | .500 | 17 | – | 16 | .515 |
| Kennesaw State | 7 | – | 9 | .438 | 11 | – | 19 | .367 |
| Jacksonville | 6 | – | 10 | .375 | 11 | – | 20 | .355 |
| Bellarmine* | 5 | – | 11 | .313 | 10 | – | 19 | .345 |
| North Florida | 3 | – | 13 | .188 | 9 | – | 21 | .300 |
| Queens* | 1 | – | 15 | .063 | 7 | – | 22 | .241 |
† 2024 ASUN tournament winner *Ineligible for the 2024 NCAA tournament due to transition from Division II

The 2023–24 Kennesaw State Owls women's basketball team represented Kennesaw State University during the 2023–24 NCAA Division I women's basketball season. The Owls, led by third-year head coach Octavia Blue, played their home games at the KSU Convocation Center in Kennesaw, Georgia as members of the Atlantic Sun (ASUN) Conference. This was the Owls' last season as members of the ASUN Conference, as they moved to Conference USA, effective July 1, 2024.

== Previous season ==
The Owls finished the 2022–23 season 15–16, 10–8 in ASUN play, to finish in a tie for sixth place. As the #7 seed in the ASUN tournament, they defeated #8 seed Jacksonville State in the first round, before falling to #2 seed Liberty in the quarterfinals.

== Roster ==
2023–24 Kennesaw State Owls women's basketball team
Players
Coaches

| Pos. | # | Name | Height | Year | Previous school | Hometown |
|---|---|---|---|---|---|---|
| G | 0 | Kailyn Fields | 5 ft 6 in (1.68 m) | Fr | The Galloway School | Atlanta, GA |
| G | 1 | Carly Hooks | 5 ft 8 in (1.73 m) | Sr | East Tennessee State | Atlanta, GA |
| F | 2 | Trynce Taylor | 6 ft 1 in (1.85 m) | Fr | St. Francis School | Alpharetta, GA |
| G | 3 | Lee Lee Willis | 5 ft 6 in (1.68 m) | So | Chandler AZ Compass Prep | Chandler, AZ |
| F | 4 | Layla Hood | 6 ft 0 in (1.83 m) | So | Mercer | Fayetteville, GA |
| G | 5 | Tania Allen | 6 ft 0 in (1.83 m) | Jr | Panola College | Chicago, IL |
| G | 11 | Laura Toffali | 5 ft 9 in (1.75 m) | So | Limonta Costa Masnaga | Villasanta, Italy |
| G | 12 | Sophia Rueppell | 5 ft 8 in (1.73 m) | Fr | Bishop Kenny High School | Jacksonville, FL |
| G | 15 | Morgan Dillard | 5 ft 10 in (1.78 m) | Jr | Southern Miss | Sanford, FL |
| G | 21 | Keyarah Berry | 5 ft 9 in (1.75 m) | Jr | Indiana | Rockmart, GA |
| F/C | 22 | Kyndall Golden | 6 ft 3 in (1.91 m) | Sr | Vanderbilt | Atlanta, GA |
| F | 24 | Prencis Harden | 5 ft 11 in (1.8 m) | Jr | Emanuel County Institute | Swainsboro, GA |
| F | 32 | Kayla Massop | 6 ft 0 in (1.83 m) | GS | North Georgia | Plantation, FL |
| F | 45 | Taylor Cullinan | 6 ft 3 in (1.91 m) | Jr | Alabama | Dallas, GA |

Head coach

- Octavia Blue (Miami (FL))

Assistant coach(es)

- Keisha McClinic (Middle Tennessee)
- Malikah Willis (Iowa)
- Morgan Stroman (Miami (FL))

Legend

- (C) Team captain
- (S) Suspended
- (I) Ineligible
- (W) Walk-on
- Injured
- Current redshirt

Roster
Last update: December 29, 2023

== Schedule and results ==
| Date time, TV | Rank^{#} | Opponent^{#} | Result | Record | High points | High rebounds | High assists | Site (attendance) city, state |
Non-conference regular season
| November 6, 2023*; 12:00 p.m., SECN+ | | at Vanderbilt | L 51–98 | 0–1 | 15 – Berry | 7 – Berry | 3 – Hooks | Memorial Gymnasium (2,943); Nashville, TN |
| November 10, 2023*; 7:00 p.m., ESPN+ | | Life | W 62–45 | 1–1 | 12 – Berry | 9 – Golden | 5 – Willis | KSU Convocation Center (185); Kennesaw, GA |
| November 14, 2023*; 6:30 p.m., ESPN+ | | at Georgia State | L 52–62 | 1–2 | 16 – Berry | 7 – Golden | 5 – Willis | GSU Convocation Center (813); Atlanta, GA |
| November 19, 2023*; 2:00 p.m., ESPN+ | | at Georgia Tech | L 38–77 | 1–3 | 17 – Rueppell | 5 – Taylor | 5 – Willis | McCamish Pavilion (1,957); Atlanta, GA |
| November 25, 2023*; 2:00 p.m., ESPN+ | | Florida Atlantic | W 57–43 | 2–3 | 24 – Hooks | 10 – 2 tied | 2 – 2 tied | KSU Convocation Center (136); Kennesaw, GA |
| November 29, 2023*; 7:00 p.m., ESPN+ | | Chattanooga | L 43–49 | 2–4 | 20 – Hooks | 13 – Golden | 2 – 2 tied | KSU Convocation Center (414); Kennesaw, GA |
| December 2, 2023*; 4:00 p.m., ESPN+ | | Coastal Georgia | W 82–25 | 3–4 | 25 – Harden | 5 – Harden | 3 – 2 tied | KSU Convocation Center (421); Kennesaw, GA |
| December 11, 2023*; 7:30 p.m., SECN+ | | at Mississippi State | L 50–91 | 3–5 | 19 – Taylor | 12 – Taylor | 3 – 2 tied | Humphrey Coliseum (4,085); Starkville, MS |
| December 17, 2023*; 2:00 p.m., ESPN+ | | Belmont | L 54–65 | 3–6 | 17 – Harden | 9 – Harden | 3 – Hooks | KSU Convocation Center (459); Kennesaw, GA |
| December 20, 2023*; 1:15 p.m. | | vs. San Diego State; West Palm Beach Classic | L 52–75 | 3–7 | 15 – Taylor | 10 – Harden | 2 – 2 tied | Rubin Arena (44); West Palm Beach, FL |
| December 21, 2023*; 1:15 p.m. | | vs. Providence; West Palm Beach Classic | W 53–51 | 4–7 | 23 – Harden | 8 – Harden | 2 – 3 tied | Rubin Arena (48); West Palm Beach, FL |
| December 28, 2023*; 7:00 p.m., ESPN+ | | Georgetown | L 55–57 | 4–8 | 12 – 2 tied | 11 – Harden | 6 – Fields | KSU Convocation Center (970); Kennesaw, GA |
| January 2, 2024*; 7:00 p.m., ESPN+ | | at Mercer | L 54-70 | 4-9 | 22 – Hooks | 12 – Harden | 2 – 2 tied | Hawkins Arena (483); Macon, GA |
ASUN regular season
| January 6, 2024; 2:00 p.m., ESPN+ | | Queens | W 61-42 | 5-9 (1-0) | 18 – Harden | 14 – Harden | 6 – Fields | KSU Convocation Center (684); Kennesaw, GA |
| January 11, 2024; 7:00 p.m., ESPN+ | | North Florida | W 52-43 | 6-9 (2-0) | 21 – Harden | 7 – Harden | 4 – Fields | KSU Convocation Center (506); Kennesaw, GA |
| January 13, 2024; 2:00 p.m., ESPN+ | | Jacksonville | W 59-57 | 7-9 (3-0) | 10 – Harden | 8 – Harden | 5 – Hooks | KSU Convocation Center (629); Kennesaw, GA |
| January 18, 2024; 7:00 p.m., ESPN+ | | at Stetson | W 63-48 | 8-9 (4-0) | 31 – Hooks | 14 – 2 tied | 2 – Hooks | Edmunds Center (296); DeLand, FL |
| January 20, 2024; 4:00 p.m., ESPN+ | | at Florida Gulf Coast | L 65-93 | 8-10 (4-1) | 22 – Dillard | 4 – Hood | 2 – 2 tied | Alico Arena (1,734); Fort Myers, FL |
| January 24, 2024; 7:00 p.m., ESPN+ | | at North Alabama | L 60-79 | 8-11 (4-2) | 14 – Harden | 8 – Taylor | 5 – Hooks | CB&S Bank Arena (1,032); Florence, AL |
| January 27, 2024; 2:00 p.m., ESPN+ | | Central Arkansas | L 60-67 | 8-12 (4-3) | 22 – Harden | 14 – Harden | 5 – Hooks | KSU Convocation Center (794); Kennesaw, GA |
| February 1, 2024; 5:00 p.m., ESPN+ | | Austin Peay | L 50-61 | 8-13 (4-4) | 22 – Harden | 11 – Harden | 4 – Hooks | KSU Convocation Center (472); Kennesaw, GA |
| February 3, 2024; 2:00 p.m., ESPN+ | | Lipscomb | W 62-59 | 9-13 (5-4) | 15 – Dillard | 10 – Taylor | 5 – Fields | KSU Convocation Center (757); Kennesaw, GA |
| February 8, 2024; 6:30 p.m., ESPN+ | | at Bellarmine | W 85-75 | 10-13 (6-4) | 30 – Hooks | 10 – Harden | 4 – Hooks | Freedom Hall (514); Louisville, KY |
| February 10, 2024; 4:00 p.m., ESPN+ | | at Eastern Kentucky | L 66-69 | 10-14 (6-5) | 20 – Harden | 9 – 2 tied | 3 – 2 tied | Baptist Health Arena (781); Richmond, KY |
| February 15, 2024; 7:00 p.m., ESPN+ | | Florida Gulf Coast | L 42-77 | 10-15 (6-6) | 11 – Taylor | 7 – Harden | 2 – Hooks | KSU Convocation Center (739); Kennesaw, GA |
| February 17, 2024; 2:00 p.m., ESPN+ | | Stetson | L 54-64 | 10-16 (6-7) | 24 – Berry | 8 – Taylor | 3 – Hooks | KSU Convocation Center (812); Kennesaw, GA |
| February 22, 2024; 6:30 p.m., ESPN+ | | at Jacksonville | L 59-70 | 10-17 (6-8) | 13 – Berry | 7 – Taylor | 4 – Hooks | Swisher Gymnasium (245); Jacksonville, FL |
| February 24, 2024; 2:00 p.m., ESPN+ | | at North Florida | L 84-91 ^{2OT} | 10-18 (6-9) | 37 – Hooks | 12 – Harden | 5 – Harden | UNF Arena (335); Jacksonville, FL |
| March 2, 2024; 2:00 p.m., ESPN+ | | at Queens | W 81-50 | 11-18 (7-9) | 20 – Harden | 11 – Harden | 5 – Hooks | Curry Arena (230); Charlotte, NC |
ASUN tournament
| March 8, 2024; 5:00 pm, ESPN+ | (8) | at (7) Austin Peay; First Round | L 60-73 | 11-19 | 19 – Harden | 6 – Harden | 3 – 2 tied | F&M Bank Arena (91); Clarksville, TN |
*Non-conference game. ^{#}Rankings from AP poll. (#) Tournament seedings in parentheses. All times are in Eastern.
