= 2023–24 Florida Gulf Coast Eagles women's basketball team =

Intercollegiate basketball season

2023–24 Florida Gulf Coast Eagles women's basketball
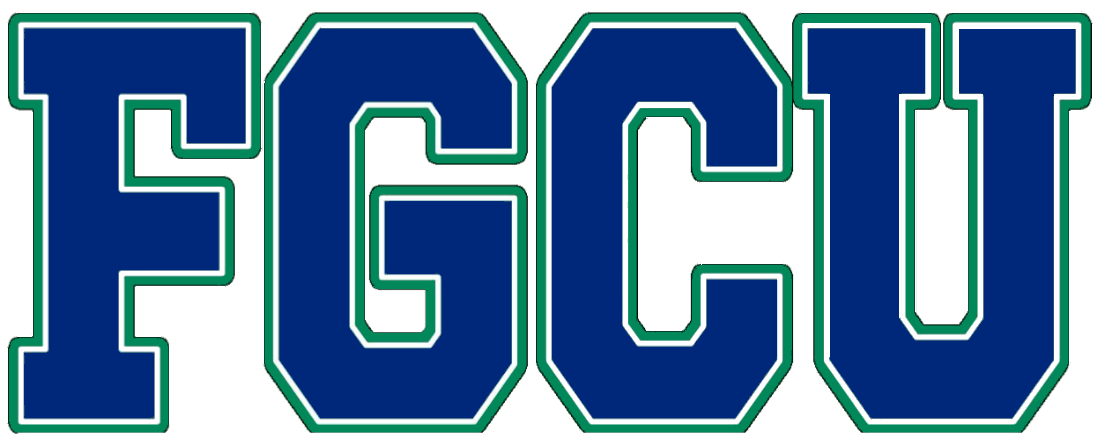

ASUN regular-season and tournament champions

NCAA tournament, first round
- Conference: ASUN
- Record: 29–5 (16–0 ASUN)
- Head coach: Karl Smesko (22nd season)
- Assistant coaches: Chelsea Lyles; Shannon Murphy; Camryn Brown
- Home arena: Alico Arena

2023–24 ASUN women's basketball standings
| | Conf. | | | | Overall |
| Team | W | | L | PCT | W | | L | PCT |
|---|---|---|---|---|---|---|---|---|
| Florida Gulf Coast † | 16 | – | 0 | 1.000 | 29 | – | 5 | .853 |
| Stetson | 12 | – | 4 | .750 | 17 | – | 15 | .531 |
| Central Arkansas | 11 | – | 5 | .688 | 21 | – | 12 | .636 |
| Lipscomb | 10 | – | 6 | .625 | 17 | – | 13 | .567 |
| Eastern Kentucky | 9 | – | 7 | .563 | 22 | – | 12 | .647 |
| North Alabama | 8 | – | 8 | .500 | 12 | – | 18 | .400 |
| Austin Peay | 8 | – | 8 | .500 | 17 | – | 16 | .515 |
| Kennesaw State | 7 | – | 9 | .438 | 11 | – | 19 | .367 |
| Jacksonville | 6 | – | 10 | .375 | 11 | – | 20 | .355 |
| Bellarmine* | 5 | – | 11 | .313 | 10 | – | 19 | .345 |
| North Florida | 3 | – | 13 | .188 | 9 | – | 21 | .300 |
| Queens* | 1 | – | 15 | .063 | 7 | – | 22 | .241 |
† 2024 ASUN tournament winner *Ineligible for the 2024 NCAA tournament due to transition from Division II

The 2023–24 Florida Gulf Coast Eagles women's basketball team represented Florida Gulf Coast University during the 2023–24 NCAA Division I women's basketball season. The Eagles, led by 22nd-year head coach Karl Smesko, played their home games at the Alico Arena in Fort Myers, Florida and were members of the Atlantic Sun Conference (ASUN).

The Eagles finished the season 29–5, 16–0 in ASUN play, to finish as ASUN regular-season champions for the seventh consecutive season. They defeated Jacksonville, Austin Peay and Central Arkansas to win their eighth consecutive ASUN tournament title and earn the conference's automatic bid to the NCAA tournament. They received the #12 seed in the Albany Regional 1, where they fell to #5 region seed Oklahoma in the first round.

== Roster ==
2023–24 Florida Gulf Coast Eagles women's basketball team
Players
Coaches

| Pos. | # | Name | Height | Year | Previous school | Hometown |
|---|---|---|---|---|---|---|
| G | 0 | Casey Santoro | 5 ft 4 in (1.63 m) | Sr | Bellevue HS; Kent State | Bellevue, OH |
| G | 1 | Emani Jefferson | 5 ft 9 in (1.75 m) | RS Jr | Northport HS; Wright State; Memphis | Miami, FL |
| G | 2 | Sofia Persson | 5 ft 8 in (1.73 m) | | Lulea Gymnasieskola; Odessa; San Francisco; Eckerd | Arvika, Sweden |
| G | 3 | Cerina Rolle | 5 ft 9 in (1.75 m) | RS Fr | Eustis HS | Eustis, FL |
| G | 4 | Dolly Cairns | 5 ft 6 in (1.68 m) | Sr | Saratoga Springs HS; Rhode Island | Saratoga Springs, NY |
| G | 5 | Ajulu Thatha | 6 ft 1 in (1.85 m) | | Decatur Central HS; SIU Edwardsville | Indianapolis, IN |
| G | 10 | Jordan Campbell | 5 ft 9 in (1.75 m) | RS So | IMG Academy | Purcellville, VA |
| G/F | 11 | Maddie Antenucci | 5 ft 10 in (1.78 m) | RS Jr | Indian Hill | Cincinnati, OH |
| G | 12 | Alyssa Jimenez | 6 ft 0 in (1.83 m) | | Horizon HS; Nevada | Thornton, CO |
| F | 14 | Shekinah Guthrie | 5 ft 10 in (1.78 m) | GS | Centennial; Palm Beach Atlantic | Atlanta, GA |
| G | 20 | Maca Retamales | 6 ft 1 in (1.85 m) | Jr | Liceo San Pedro Poveda HS; Florida SouthWestern State | Santiago, Chile |
| G | 21 | Kierra Adams | 6 ft 0 in (1.83 m) | | Brookwood | Vancouver, WA |
| G | 22 | Brylee Bartram | 5 ft 8 in (1.73 m) | RS Sr | Seffner; Vanderbilt | Tampa, FL |
| G | 23 | Ashley Baez | 5 ft 6 in (1.68 m) | Jr | Hyde School; Chipola College | Santo Domingo, Dominican Republic |
| F | 24 | Uju Ezeudu | 6 ft 0 in (1.83 m) | | Reynoldsburg; Denver | Reynoldsburg, OH |
| G | 32 | Emani Theodule | 5 ft 6 in (1.68 m) | Fr | American Heritage HS; Warner | Miramar, FL |

Head coach

- Karl Smesko (Kent State)

Assistant coach(es)

- Chelsea Lyles (Florida Gulf Coast)
- Shannon Murphy (Florida Gulf Coast)
- Camryn Brown (High Point)

Legend

- (C) Team captain
- (S) Suspended
- (I) Ineligible
- (W) Walk-on
- Injured
- Current redshirt

Roster
Last update: August 28, 2024

== Schedule ==
| Date time, TV | Rank^{#} | Opponent^{#} | Result | Record | Site (attendance) city, state |
Non-conference regular season
| November 6, 2023*; 7:00 p.m., ESPN+ | | at Brown | W 80–58 | 1–0 | Pizzitola Sports Center (648); Providence, RI |
| November 10, 2023*; 10:00 p.m. | | at No. 21 USC | L 51–67 | 1–1 | Galen Center (4,712); Los Angeles, CA |
| November 14, 2023*; 7:00 p.m., ESPN+ | | FIU | W 81–48 | 2–1 | Alico Arena (1,503); Fort Myers, FL |
| November 19, 2023*; 2:00 p.m., ESPN+ | | Kentucky | W 59–48 | 3–1 | Alico Arena (1,863); Fort Myers, FL |
| November 24, 2023*; 5:00 p.m., FloHoops | | vs. Delaware; Gulf Coast Showcase first round | W 83–68 | 4–1 | Hertz Arena (1,034); Estero, FL |
| November 25, 2023*; 7:30 p.m., FloHoops | | vs. No. 5 Iowa; Gulf Coast Showcase semifinals | L 62–100 | 4–2 | Hertz Arena (4,257); Estero, FL |
| November 26, 2023*; 5:00 p.m., FloHoops | | vs. No. 18 North Carolina; Gulf Coast Showcase 3rd-place game | W 65–64 | 5–2 | Hertz Arena (2,120); Estero, FL |
| November 29, 2023*; 7:00 p.m., ESPN+ | | Ave Maria | W 108–31 | 6–2 | Alico Arena (1,349); Fort Myers, FL |
| December 3, 2023*; 1:00 p.m., ESPN+ | | at Old Dominion | L 42–55 | 6–3 | Chartway Arena (1,759); Norfolk, VA |
| December 7, 2023*; 7:00 p.m., ESPN+ | | Gardner–Webb | W 102–53 | 7–3 | Alico Arena (1,251); Fort Myers, FL |
| December 10, 2023*; 12:00 p.m., ACCN | | at Duke | L 63–82 | 7–4 | Cameron Indoor Stadium (1,573); Durham, NC |
| December 20, 2023*; 7:00 p.m., ESPN+ | | Drexel; Homewood Suites Classic | W 61–35 | 8–4 | Alico Arena (1,416); Fort Myers, FL |
| December 21, 2023*; 7:00 p.m., ESPN+ | | Southern Miss; Homewood Suites Classic | W 78–62 | 9–4 | Alico Arena (1,319); Fort Myers, FL |
| December 28, 2023*; 7:00 p.m., ESPN+ | | Webber International | W 106–42 | 10–4 | Alico Arena (1,443); Fort Myers, FL |
ASUN regular season
| January 4, 2024; 6:30 p.m., ESPN+ | | at Jacksonville | W 69–47 | 11–4 (1–0) | Swisher Gymnasium (75); Jacksonville, FL |
| January 6, 2024; 2:00 p.m., ESPN+ | | at North Florida | W 70–38 | 12–4 (2–0) | UNF Arena (346); Jacksonville, FL |
| January 13, 2024; 2:00 p.m., ESPN+ | | at Stetson | W 66–51 | 13–4 (3–0) | Edmunds Center (252); DeLand, FL |
| January 18, 2024; 7:00 p.m., ESPN+ | | Queens | W 82–57 | 14–4 (4–0) | Alico Arena (1,708); Fort Myers, FL |
| January 20, 2024; 4:00 p.m., ESPN+ | | Kennesaw State | W 93–56 | 15–4 (5–0) | Alico Arena (1,734); Fort Myers, FL |
| January 25, 2024; 7:00 p.m., ESPN+ | | at Lipscomb | W 75–54 | 16–4 (6–0) | Allen Arena (521); Nashville, TN |
| January 27, 2024; 7:00 p.m., ESPN+ | | at Austin Peay | W 65–54 | 17–4 (7–0) | F&M Bank Arena (2,061); Clarksville, TN |
| January 31, 2024; 6:30 p.m., ESPN+ | | at Bellarmine | W 72–55 | 18–4 (8–0) | Freedom Hall (362); Louisville, KY |
| February 3, 2024; 7:00 p.m., ESPN+ | | Eastern Kentucky | W 82–69 | 19–4 (9–0) | Alico Arena (1,804); Fort Myers, FL |
| February 8, 2024; 7:00 p.m., ESPN+ | | Central Arkansas | W 65–43 | 20–4 (10–4) | Alico Arena (1,602); Fort Myers, FL |
| February 10, 2024; 4:00 p.m., ESPN+ | | North Alabama | W 84–42 | 21–4 (11–0) | Alico Arena (1,821); Fort Myers, FL |
| February 15, 2024; 7:00 p.m., ESPN+ | | at Kennesaw State | W 77–42 | 22–4 (12–0) | KSU Convocation Center (739); Kennesaw, GA |
| February 17, 2024; 2:00 p.m., ESPN+ | | at Queens | W 86–60 | 23–4 (13–0) | Curry Arena (125); Charlotte, NC |
| February 24, 2024; 4:00 p.m., ESPN+ | | Stetson | W 68–52 | 24–4 (14–0) | Alico Arena (1,984); Fort Myers, FL |
| February 29, 2024; 7:00 p.m., ESPN+ | | North Florida | W 75–33 | 25–4 (15–0) | Alico Arena (1,830); Fort Myers, FL |
| March 2, 2024; 7:00 p.m., ESPN+ | | Jacksonville | W 80–55 | 26–4 (16–0) | Alico Arena (1,814); Fort Myers, FL |
ASUN women's tournament
| March 9, 2024; 6:00 p.m., ESPN+ | (1) | (9) Jacksonville; Quarterfinals | W 76–69 | 27–4 | Alico Arena (1,261); Fort Myers, FL |
| March 12, 2024; 7:00 p.m., ESPN+ | (1) | (7) Austin Peay; Semifinals | W 74–52 | 28–4 | Alico Arena (1,487); Fort Myers, FL |
| March 16, 2024; 7:00 p.m., ESPN+ | (1) | (3) Central Arkansas; Championship | W 76–47 | 29–4 | Alico Arena (2,259); Fort Myers, FL |
NCAA tournament
| March 23, 2024*; 4:00 p.m., ESPNews | (12 A1) | vs. (5 A1) No. 18 Oklahoma; First round | L 70–73 | 29–5 | Simon Skjodt Assembly Hall (12,753); Bloomington, IN |
*Non-conference game. ^{#}Rankings from AP poll. (#) Tournament seedings in parentheses. A1=Albany 1. All times are in Eastern.

== See also ==
- 2023–24 Florida Gulf Coast Eagles men's basketball team
