= 2024 ASUN women's basketball tournament =

American college basketball postseason tournament

- Classification: Division I
- Season: 2023–24
- Teams: 10
- Site: Campus sites
- Champions: Florida Gulf Coast (11th title)
- Winning coach: Karl Smesko (11th title)
- Television: ESPN+

2023–24 ASUN women's basketball standings
	Conf.				Overall
Team	W		L	PCT	W		L	PCT
Florida Gulf Coast †	16	–	0	1.000	29	–	5	.853
Stetson	12	–	4	.750	17	–	15	.531
Central Arkansas	11	–	5	.688	21	–	12	.636
Lipscomb	10	–	6	.625	17	–	13	.567
Eastern Kentucky	9	–	7	.563	22	–	12	.647
North Alabama	8	–	8	.500	12	–	18	.400
Austin Peay	8	–	8	.500	17	–	16	.515
Kennesaw State	7	–	9	.438	11	–	19	.367
Jacksonville	6	–	10	.375	11	–	20	.355
Bellarmine*	5	–	11	.313	10	–	19	.345
North Florida	3	–	13	.188	9	–	21	.300
Queens*	1	–	15	.063	7	–	22	.241
† 2024 ASUN tournament winner *Ineligible for the 2024 NCAA tournament due to transition from Division II

The 2024 Atlantic Sun women's basketball tournament was the conference postseason tournament for the Atlantic Sun Conference. The tournament was the 45th year the league has conducted a postseason tournament. The tournament was held March 8–16 at campus sites of the higher seeds.The winner will received the conference's automatic bid to the 2024 NCAA Tournament.

== Seeds ==
Ten teams contested the bracket. All rounds reseed instead of a traditional set bracket; to that end, the 9 and 10 seeds played each other in round 1, and the 7 and 8 seeds do as well, rather than the traditional 7/10 and 8/9 matchup.

The two tiebreakers used by the Atlantic Sun are: 1) head-to-head record of teams with identical record and 2) NCAA NET Rankings available on day following the conclusion of regular season play.

Seed	School	Conference	Head-to-Head	NET ranking
1	Florida Gulf Coast	16–0		
2	Stetson	12–4		
3	Central Arkansas	11–5		
4	Lipscomb	10–6		
5	Eastern Kentucky	9–7		
6	North Alabama	8–8	2–0 vs. Austin Peay	
7	Austin Peay	8–8	0–2 vs. North Alabama	
8	Kennesaw State	7–9		
9	Jacksonville	6–10		
10	Bellarmine	5–11		
DNQ	North Florida	3–13		
DNQ	Queens	1–15		

== Schedule ==
Game	Time	Matchup	Score	Television
First round – Friday, March 8 – Campus Sites
1	5:00 pm	No. 10 Bellarmine vs No. 9 Jacksonville	62–79	ESPN+
2	5:00 pm	No. 8 Kennesaw State vs No. 7 Austin Peay	60–73	ESPN+
Quarterfinals – Saturday, March 9 – Campus Sites
3	5:00 pm	No. 9 Jacksonville at No. 1 Florida Gulf Coast	69–76	ESPN+
4	4:00 pm	No. 5 Eastern Kentucky at No. 4 Lipscomb	99–68	ESPN+
5	5:00 pm	No. 7 Austin Peay at No. 2 Stetson	49–45	ESPN+
6	6:00 pm	No. 6 North Alabama at No. 3 Central Arkansas	69–52	ESPN+
Semifinals – Tuesday, March 12 – Campus Sites
7	6:00 pm	No. 7 Austin Peay at No. 1 Florida Gulf Coast	52–74	ESPN+
8	6:30 pm	No. 5 Eastern Kentucky at No. 3 Central Arkansas	57–68	ESPN+
Championship – Saturday, March 16 – Campus Sites
9	6:00 pm	No. 3 Central Arkansas at No. 1 Florida Gulf Coast	47–76	ESPN+
Game times in CT. Rankings denote tournament seed

== Bracket ==
First round Friday, March 8
9	Jacksonville	79
10	Bellarmine	62
7	Austin Peay	73
8	Kennesaw State	60

Quarterfinals; Saturday, March 9
1	Florida Gulf Coast	76
9	Jacksonville	69
4	Lipscomb	68
5	Eastern Kentucky	99
2	Stetson	45
7	Austin Peay	49
3	Central Arkansas	69
6	North Alabama	52

Semifinals; Tuesday, March 12
1	Florida Gulf Coast	74
7	Austin Peay	52
3	Central Arkansas	68
5	Eastern Kentucky	57

Championship; Saturday, March 16
1	Florida Gulf Coast	76
3	Central Arkansas	47
