= 2023–24 North Florida Ospreys women's basketball team =

American college basketball season

2023–24 North Florida Ospreys women's basketball
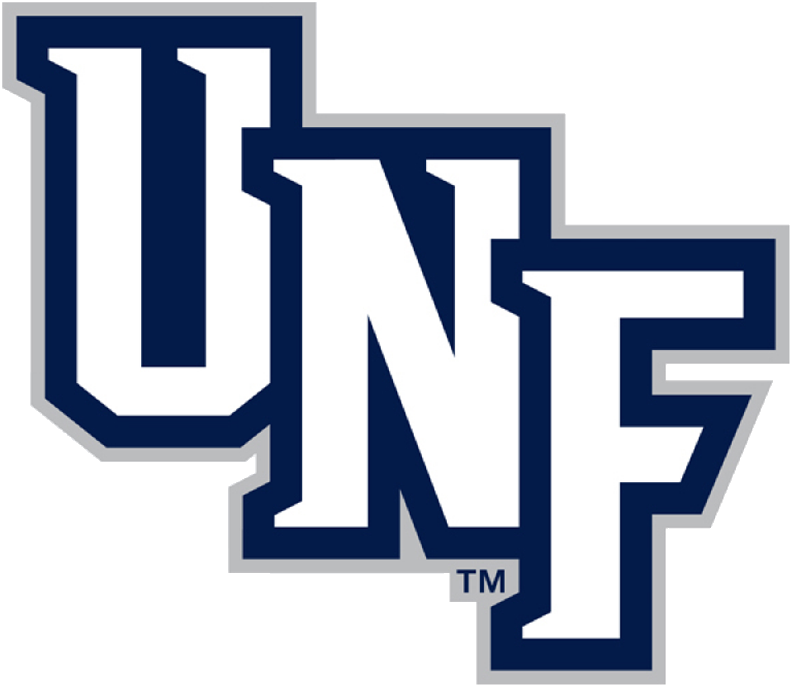
- Conference: ASUN Conference
- Record: 9–21 (3–13 ASUN)
- Head coach: Erika Lambert (1st season)
- Associate head coach: Chandler Merkerson
- Assistant coaches: Sydnei McCaskill; Benji Mastandrea
- Home arena: UNF Arena

2023–24 ASUN women's basketball standings
	Conf.				Overall
Team	W		L	PCT	W		L	PCT
Florida Gulf Coast †	16	–	0	1.000	29	–	5	.853
Stetson	12	–	4	.750	17	–	15	.531
Central Arkansas	11	–	5	.688	21	–	12	.636
Lipscomb	10	–	6	.625	17	–	13	.567
Eastern Kentucky	9	–	7	.563	22	–	12	.647
North Alabama	8	–	8	.500	12	–	18	.400
Austin Peay	8	–	8	.500	17	–	16	.515
Kennesaw State	7	–	9	.438	11	–	19	.367
Jacksonville	6	–	10	.375	11	–	20	.355
Bellarmine*	5	–	11	.313	10	–	19	.345
North Florida	3	–	13	.188	9	–	21	.300
Queens*	1	–	15	.063	7	–	22	.241
† 2024 ASUN tournament winner *Ineligible for the 2024 NCAA tournament due to transition from Division II

The 2023–24 North Florida Ospreys women's basketball team represented the University of North Florida during the 2023–24 NCAA Division I women's basketball season. The Ospreys, led by first-year head coach Erika Lambert, played their home games at the UNF Arena in Jacksonville, Florida as members of the ASUN Conference. They finished the season 9–21, 3–13 in ASUN play, to finish in 11th place.

== Previous season ==
The Ospreys finished the 2022–23 season 8–20, 5–13 in ASUN play, to finish in a tie for 11th place. They failed to qualify for the ASUN tournament, as only the top 10 teams qualify.

On March 2, 2023, the school announced that Darrick Gibbs would not be returning as the team's head coach, following eight season at the helm. On April 7, Abilene Christian assistant coach Erika Lambert was named the team's new head coach.

== Roster ==
2023–24 North Florida Ospreys women's basketball team
Players
Coaches

Pos.	#	Name	Height	Year	Previous school	Hometown
G	1	Kirsten Clark	5 ft 9 in (1.75 m)	Fr	Ben Davis HS	Indianapolis, IN
G	2	Alexa Washington	5 ft 6 in (1.68 m)	Fr	Oakland Catholic HS	Monroeville, PA
G	4	Sarah Taub	5 ft 9 in (1.75 m)	So	Campbell HS	Marietta, GA
G	5	Helena Rafnsdottir	5 ft 11 in (1.8 m)	So	Sudurnes Comprehensive College	Reykjanesbær, Iceland
G	10	Maddie Millar	5 ft 9 in (1.75 m)	So	Bishop Kenny HS	Amelia Island, FL
F	11	Kyla Cain	5 ft 10 in (1.78 m)	Fr	The Galloway School	Atlanta, GA
F	13	Selma Eklund	6 ft 0 in (1.83 m)	Jr	UNC Wilmington	Stockholm, Sweden
G	21	Agnes Svansdottir	5 ft 11 in (1.8 m)	Fr	Sudurnes Comprehensive College	Keflavík, Iceland
G	22	Lyric Swann	5 ft 5 in (1.65 m)	RS Sr	CCBC Essex	Elkridge, MD
G	23	Kaila Rougier	5 ft 5 in (1.65 m)	Jr	Beach HS	Savannah, GA
G	24	Jayla Adams	5 ft 6 in (1.68 m)	GS	George Mason	Daytona Beach, FL
F	40	Emma Broermann	6 ft 3 in (1.91 m)	GS	Badin HS	Okeana, OH

Head coach

- Erika Lambert (College of Charleston)

Assistant coach(es)

- Chandler Merkerson (North Florida)
- Sydnei McCaskill (Florida Gulf Coast)
- Benji Mastandrea (North Florida)

Legend

- (C) Team captain
- (S) Suspended
- (I) Ineligible
- (W) Walk-on
- Injured
- Current redshirt

Roster
Last update: December 28, 2023

== Schedule and results ==
Date time, TV	Rank^{#}	Opponent^{#}	Result	Record	High points	High rebounds	High assists	Site (attendance) city, state
Non-conference regular season
November 6, 2023*; 5:30 p.m., SECN+		at Florida	L 65–82	0–1	14 – Adams	4 – 3 tied	5 – Adams	O'Connell Center (1,112); Gainesville, FL
November 9, 2023*; 11:00 a.m., ESPN+		Trinity Baptist	W 116–44	1–1	18 – 2 tied	15 – Brown	5 – Taub	UNF Arena (2,200); Jacksonville, FL
November 13, 2023*; 7:00 p.m., ESPN+		Florida Atlantic	L 75–84 ^{OT}	1–2	19 – Broermann	9 – Broermann	10 – Adams	UNF Arena (599); Jacksonville, FL
November 15, 2023*; 9:00 p.m., ESPN+		at Gonzaga	L 55–83	1–3	12 – Adams	7 – Taub	4 – Adams	McCarthey Athletic Center (4,845); Spokane, WA
November 19, 2023*; 2:00 p.m., ESPN+		at South Florida	L 55–56	1–4	20 – Adams	7 – Rafnsdottir	3 – Adams	Yuengling Center (4,534); Tampa, FL
November 24, 2023*; 4:30 p.m., ESPN+		at Georgia Southern; GATA Turkey Throwdown	L 75–85	1–5	21 – Rougier	9 – Eklund	6 – Adams	Hanner Fieldhouse (459); Statesboro, GA
November 25, 2023*; 2:00 p.m.		vs. USC Upstate; GATA Turkey Throwdown	L 60–73	1–6	11 – 3 tied	8 – Eklund	3 – Swann	Hanner Fieldhouse (100); Statesboro, GA
November 29, 2023*; 7:00 p.m., ESPN+		Warner	W 68–51	2–6	16 – Rougier	14 – Rougier	7 – Adams	UNF Arena (319); Jacksonville, FL
December 2, 2023*; 12:00 p.m., ESPN+		at Saint Joseph's	L 65–84	2–7	16 – Swann	6 – Broermann	4 – Eklund	Hagan Arena (517); Philadelphia, PA
December 4, 2023*; 11:00 a.m., ESPN+		at Coppin State	W 49–43	3–7	11 – 2 tied	11 – Broermann	3 – Rougier	Physical Education Complex (3,552); Baltimore, MD
December 13, 2023*; 2:00 p.m., ESPN+		Piedmont	W 105–66	4–7	31 – Washington	9 – Broermann	6 – Adams	UNF Arena (101); Jacksonville, FL
December 16, 2023*; 5:00 p.m., ESPN+		at No. 12т Kansas State	L 53–79	4–8	12 – Swann	3 – 2 tied	3 – Swann	Bramlage Coliseum (3,419); Manhattan, KS
December 20, 2023*; 12:00 p.m., ESPN+		Winthrop	W 55–49	5–8	13 – 2 tied	6 – Eklund	2 – 4 tied	UNF Arena (283); Jacksonville, FL
December 29, 2023*; 7:00 p.m., ESPN+		Florida A&M	W 76–71 ^{OT}	6–8	20 – Rougier	8 – Broermann	4 – Eklund	UNF Arena (559); Jacksonville, FL
ASUN regular season
January 4, 2024; 7:00 p.m., ESPN+		Stetson	L 57–61	6–9 (0–1)	13 – Swann	11 – Broermann	5 – Adams	UNF Arena (329); Jacksonville, FL
January 6, 2024; 2:00 p.m., ESPN+		Florida Gulf Coast	L 38–70	6–10 (0–2)	11 – Swann	7 – Eklund	3 – Taub	UNF Arena (346); Jacksonville, FL
January 11, 2024; 7:00 p.m., ESPN+		at Kennesaw State	L 43–52	6–11 (0–3)	11 – Adams	10 – Broermann	3 – 2 tied	KSU Convocation Center (506); Kennesaw, GA
January 13, 2024; 2:00 p.m., ESPN+		at Queens	W 76–57	7–11 (1–3)	17 – 2 tied	5 – Broermann	3 – Adams	Curry Arena (144); Charlotte, NC
January 25, 2024; 7:00 p.m., ESPN+		Bellarmine	L 63–69	7–12 (1–4)	19 – Adams	10 – Broermann	2 – Rougier	UNF Arena (346); Jacksonville, FL
January 27, 2024; 2:00 p.m., ESPN+		Eastern Kentucky	L 56–79	7–13 (1–5)	11 – Broermann	12 – Broermann	3 – Taub	UNF Arena (467); Jacksonville, FL
February 1, 2024; 6:30 p.m., ESPN+		at North Alabama	L 51–60	7–14 (1–6)	13 – Adams	9 – Eklund	2 – 2 tied	CB&S Bank Arena (1,117); Florence, AL
February 3, 2024; 2:00 p.m., ESPN+		at Central Arkansas	L 44–58	7–15 (1–7)	10 – Washington	8 – Broermann	2 – 2 tied	Farris Center (722); Conway, AR
February 7, 2024; 7:00 p.m., ESPN+		Austin Peay	W 52–50	8–15 (2–7)	15 – Adams	8 – 2 tied	2 – 2 tied	UNF Arena (396); Jacksonville, FL
February 10, 2024; 2:30 p.m., ESPN+		at Lipscomb	L 82–94 ^{2OT}	8–16 (2–8)	23 – Rougier	10 – Broermann	4 – 2 tied	Allen Arena (563); Nashville, TN
February 15, 2024; 7:00 p.m., ESPN+		Jacksonville	L 60–77	8–17 (2–9)	17 – Rougier	12 – Broermann	2 – 2 tied	UNF Arena (456); Jacksonville, FL
February 17, 2024; 2:00 p.m., ESPN+		at Jacksonville	L 60–73	8–18 (2–10)	22 – Adams	10 – Taub	4 – Adams	Swisher Gymnasium (317); Jacksonville, FL
February 22, 2024; 7:00 p.m., ESPN+		Queens	L 72–77	8–19 (2–11)	21 – Swann	11 – Broermann	6 – Adams	UNF Arena (319); Jacksonville, FL
February 24, 2024; 2:00 p.m., ESPN+		Kennesaw State	W 91–84 ^{2OT}	9–19 (3–11)	24 – Broermann	12 – Broermann	8 – Adams	UNF Arena (335); Jacksonville, FL
February 29, 2024; 7:00 p.m., ESPN+		at Florida Gulf Coast	L 33–75	9–20 (3–12)	7 – 3 tied	7 – Broermann	1 – 4 tied	Alico Arena (1,830); Fort Myers, FL
March 2, 2024; 2:00 p.m., ESPN+		at Stetson	L 56–59	9–21 (3–13)	16 – Swann	11 – Broermann	4 – Taub	Edmunds Center (431); DeLand, FL
*Non-conference game. ^{#}Rankings from AP poll. (#) Tournament seedings in parentheses. All times are in Eastern.
