= 2023–24 Queens Royals women's basketball team =

American college basketball season

2023–24 Queens Royals women's basketball
- Conference: ASUN Conference
- Record: 7–22 (1–15 ASUN)
- Head coach: Jen Brown (4th season)
- Assistant coaches: Vanessa Taylor; Danielle Robinson; Jayson Alexander; Chris Eddings
- Home arena: Curry Arena

2023–24 ASUN women's basketball standings
	Conf.				Overall
Team	W		L	PCT	W		L	PCT
Florida Gulf Coast †	16	–	0	1.000	29	–	5	.853
Stetson	12	–	4	.750	17	–	15	.531
Central Arkansas	11	–	5	.688	21	–	12	.636
Lipscomb	10	–	6	.625	17	–	13	.567
Eastern Kentucky	9	–	7	.563	22	–	12	.647
North Alabama	8	–	8	.500	12	–	18	.400
Austin Peay	8	–	8	.500	17	–	16	.515
Kennesaw State	7	–	9	.438	11	–	19	.367
Jacksonville	6	–	10	.375	11	–	20	.355
Bellarmine*	5	–	11	.313	10	–	19	.345
North Florida	3	–	13	.188	9	–	21	.300
Queens*	1	–	15	.063	7	–	22	.241
† 2024 ASUN tournament winner *Ineligible for the 2024 NCAA tournament due to transition from Division II

The 2023–24 Queens Royals women's basketball team represented the Queens University of Charlotte during the 2023–24 NCAA Division I women's basketball season. The Royals, led by fourth-year head coach Jen Brown, played their home games at Curry Arena in Charlotte, North Carolina as second-year members of the ASUN Conference.

The Royals finished the season 7–22, 1–15 in ASUN play, to finish in last place. They failed to qualify for the ASUN tournament, as only the top eight teams qualify.

The season marked Queens' second year of a four-year transition period from Division II to Division I. As a result, the Royals are not eligible for NCAA postseason play until the 2026–27 season.

== Previous season ==
The Royals finished the 2022–23 season 8–21, 3–15 in ASUN play, to finish in a tie for 13th (last) place. They failed to qualify for the ASUN tournament, as only the top 10 teams qualify.

== Roster ==
2023–24 Queens Royals women's basketball team
Players
Coaches

Pos.	#	Name	Height	Year	Previous school	Hometown
F	0	Jordyn Weaver	5 ft 11 in (1.8 m)	So	Sam Houston	San Antonio, TX
G	1	Adia Brisker	5 ft 8 in (1.73 m)	Sr	Morgan State	Pittsburgh, PA
G	2	Alexandria Johnson	5 ft 6 in (1.68 m)	Sr	Southern Arkansas University Tech	Little Rock, AR
G	3	Nicole Gwynn	5 ft 7 in (1.7 m)	Jr	South Carolina State	Hartford, CT
F	4	Kaitlyn Adams	5 ft 11 in (1.8 m)	Fr	Winston Salem Christian School	Winston-Salem, NC
G	5	Tameia Shaw	5 ft 5 in (1.65 m)	Jr	East Nashville Magnet High School	Nashville, TN
G	6	Mycala Carney	—	Jr	Rowan	Williamstown, NJ
C	8	Autumn Westmoreland	6 ft 0 in (1.83 m)	Sr	Savannah State	Las Vegas, NV
G	12	Kennedy Fuller	5 ft 7 in (1.7 m)	Jr	Charles J. Colgan High School	Woodbridge, VA
C	15	Hawa Balde	6 ft 4 in (1.93 m)	So	INS Euclides	Pineda de Mar, Spain
F	20	Amari Davis	5 ft 10 in (1.78 m)	Sr	Providence High School	Charlotte, NC
F	21	Kinley Brown	5 ft 10 in (1.78 m)	Sr	McLennan Community College	Dallas, TX
G	23	Trinity Butler	5 ft 10 in (1.78 m)	Fr	Hebron Christian Academy	Dacula, GA
G	24	Tiziana Huici	5 ft 8 in (1.73 m)	Jr	Rocamora	Corrientes, Argentina
C	32	Kemia Ward	6 ft 2 in (1.88 m)	Jr	Holy Spirit Prep	Powder Springs, GA

Head coach

- Jen Brown (James Madison)

Assistant coach(es)

- Vanessa Taylor (Tuskegee)
- Danielle Robinson (Morgan State)
- Jayson Alexander (Eureka)
- Chris Eddings (Memphis)

Legend

- (C) Team captain
- (S) Suspended
- (I) Ineligible
- (W) Walk-on
- Injured
- Current redshirt

Roster
Last update: December 27, 2023

== Schedule and results ==
Date time, TV	Rank^{#}	Opponent^{#}	Result	Record	High points	High rebounds	High assists	Site (attendance) city, state
Non-conference regular season
November 6, 2023*; 12:00 p.m., SECN+		at No. 12 Ole Miss	L 44–91	0–1	11 – 2 tied	6 – 2 tied	2 – Brown	SJB Pavilion (7,196); Oxford, MS
November 9, 2023*; 8:00 p.m., SECN+		at No. 1 LSU	L 55–112	0–2	26 – Gwynn	3 – Westmoreland	4 – Johnson	Pete Maravich Assembly Center (10,371); Baton Rouge, LA
November 14, 2023*; 4:00 p.m., ESPN+		Johnson & Wales (NC)	W 101–51	1–2	21 – Gwynn	13 – Weaver	5 – Johnson	Curry Arena (224); Charlotte, NC
November 17, 2023*; 12:00 p.m., ESPN+		USC Upstate	W 61–51	2–2	22 – Johnson	8 – 2 tied	2 – Johnson	Curry Arena (86); Charlotte, NC
November 21, 2023*; 2:00 p.m., ESPN+		at UNC Asheville	L 53–67	2–3	15 – Gwynn	9 – Weaver	2 – 3 tied	Kimmel Arena (267); Asheville, NC
November 26, 2023*; 2:00 p.m., ESPN+		Wesleyan (GA)	W 96–36	3–3	19 – Gwynn	11 – Davis	4 – Johnson	Curry Arena (65); Charlotte, NC
November 29, 2023*; 6:30 p.m.		at South Carolina State	L 58–76	3–4	19 – Weaver	9 – Weaver	3 – 2 tied	SHM Memorial Center (135); Orangeburg, SC
December 3, 2023*; 2:00 p.m., ESPN+		at Winthrop	W 64–61	4–4	23 – Gwynn	9 – Weaver	4 – Gwynn	Winthrop Coliseum (215); Rock Hill, SC
December 6, 2023*; 7:00 p.m., ESPN+		Presbyterian	L 60–68	4–5	16 – Brown	9 – Brown	3 – Brisker	Curry Arena (104); Charlotte, NC
December 10, 2023*; 2:00 p.m., ESPN+		Columbia (SC)	W 83–62	5–5	32 – Gwynn	10 – Weaver	3 – 4 tied	Curry Arena (129); Charlotte, NC
December 17, 2023*; 2:00 p.m., ESPN+		at Radford	L 46–62	5–6	11 – Gwynn	8 – Brown	1 – 6 tied	Dedmon Center (647); Radford, VA
December 20, 2023*; 3:00 p.m., ESPN+		Western Carolina	L 63–69	5–7	14 – 2 tied	14 – Weaver	4 – Brisker	Curry Arena (61); Charlotte, NC
December 30, 2023*; 2:00 p.m., ESPN+		Gardner–Webb	W 66–48	6–7	24 – Weaver	11 – Weaver	4 – Shaw	Curry Arena (172); Charlotte, NC
ASUN regular season
January 6, 2024; 2:00 p.m., ESPN+		at Kennesaw State	L 42–61	6–8 (0–1)	15 – Gwynn	4 – 2 tied	1 – 2 tied	KSU Convocation Center (684); Kennesaw, GA
January 11, 2024; 7:00 p.m., ESPN+		Jacksonville	L 52–54	6–9 (0–2)	15 – Brisker	6 – 2 tied	5 – Shaw	Curry Arena (119); Charlotte, NC
January 13, 2024; 2:00 p.m., ESPN+		North Florida	L 57–76	6–10 (0–3)	17 – Gwynn	9 – Weaver	4 – Shaw	Curry Arena (144); Charlotte, NC
January 18, 2024; 7:00 p.m., ESPN+		at Florida Gulf Coast	L 57–82	6–11 (0–4)	17 – Huici	6 – Weaver	1 – Johnson	Alico Arena (1,708); Fort Myers, FL
January 20, 2024; 2:00 p.m., ESPN+		at Stetson	L 71–73	6–12 (0–5)	24 – Gwynn	13 – Weaver	2 – Fuller	Edmunds Center (270); DeLand, FL
January 24, 2024; 7:30 p.m., ESPN+		at Central Arkansas	L 57–76	6–13 (0–6)	17 – Weaver	12 – Weaver	1 – 2 tied	Farris Center (478); Conway, AR
January 27, 2024; 2:00 p.m., ESPN+		North Alabama	L 71–75	6–14 (0–7)	33 – Weaver	16 – Weaver	4 – Johnson	Curry Arena (132); Charlotte, NC
February 1, 2024; 5:30 p.m., ESPN+		Lipscomb	L 63–76	6–15 (0–8)	18 – Gwynn	8 – Weaver	6 – Fuller	Curry Arena (55); Charlotte, NC
February 3, 2024; 1:00 p.m., ESPN+		Austin Peay	L 38–63	6–16 (0–9)	12 – 2 tied	5 – 3 tied	1 – 3 tied	Curry Arena (215); Charlotte, NC
February 8, 2024; 7:00 p.m., ESPN+		at Eastern Kentucky	L 67–88	6–17 (0–10)	13 – Gwynn	5 – Weaver	3 – 2 tied	Baptist Health Arena (351); Richmond, KY
February 10, 2024; 1:00 p.m., ESPN+		at Bellarmine	L 76–85	6–18 (0–11)	33 – Gwynn	13 – Weaver	4 – Johnson	Freedom Hall (424); Louisville, KY
February 15, 2024; 7:00 p.m., ESPN+		Stetson	L 44–62	6–19 (0–12)	14 – Gwynn	7 – Weaver	3 – Johnson	Curry Arena (67); Charlotte, NC
February 17, 2024; 2:00 p.m., ESPN+		Florida Gulf Coast	L 60–86	6–20 (0–13)	17 – Weaver	11 – Weaver	4 – Johnson	Curry Arena (125); Charlotte, NC
February 22, 2024; 7:00 p.m., ESPN+		at North Florida	W 77–72	7–20 (1–13)	25 – Weaver	8 – Weaver	3 – Johnson	UNF Arena (319); Jacksonville, FL
February 24, 2024; 2:00 p.m., ESPN+		at Jacksonville	L 66–79	7–21 (1–14)	20 – Gwynn	12 – Weaver	1 – Johnson	Swisher Gymnasium (200); Jacksonville, FL
March 2, 2024; 2:00 p.m., ESPN+		Kennesaw State	L 50–81	7–22 (1–15)	14 – Gwynn	8 – team	3 – Johnson	Curry Arena (230); Charlotte, NC
*Non-conference game. ^{#}Rankings from AP poll. (#) Tournament seedings in parentheses. All times are in Eastern.
