= F&M Bank Arena =

Multi-purpose venue in Clarksville, Tennessee, U.S.

- Interactive map of F&M Bank Arena
- Address: 101 Main Street
- Location: Clarksville, Tennessee, U.S.
- Coordinates: 36°31′46″N 87°21′35″W
- Owner: Montgomery County, Tennessee
- Operator: Sabertooth Sports & Entertainment, LLC
- Capacity: Sports: Concerts: 6,000; Basketball: 5,500; Ice hockey: 5,000
- Surface: Multi-surface

Construction
- Groundbreaking: November 12, 2020
- Opened: July 2023
- Cost: $115 million
- General contractor: Skanska

Tenants
- Austin Peay Governors men's and women's basketball (2023–present); Red River Spartans (USPHL) (2024–present); Nashville Kats (AF1) (2026–present)

Website
- myfmbankarena.com

F&M Bank Arena is the arena for the Austin Peay Governors men's and women's basketball teams of the United Athletic Conference. Located in downtown Clarksville, Tennessee, it seats up to 6,000 people. In addition to the main space, which holds events such as APSU's basketball games, concerts, banquets, conventions, and many other events, there is a second floor of F&M Bank Arena that will mainly be used for figure and youth skating. The 250,000-square-foot complex is owned by Montgomery County and operated by the Nashville Predators and Sabretooth Sports & Entertainment, LLC, with Austin Peay serving as the facility’s primary tenant after signing a 30-year lease in Oct. 2020. F&M Bank arena replaced the Winfield Dunn Center, which was the home of Governors’ basketball from Dec. 1975 to March 2023. F&M Bank Arena houses the Austin Peay’s men’s and women’s basketball coaching offices which overlooks the team’s shared practice gym featuring 11 hoops, a scoreboard, shot clock, and state-of-the-art sound system. As of October 2024, F&M Bank Arena is also the home of the Red River Spartans hockey team.

== History ==
In November 2019, the Montgomery County Commission approved funding for the new event center, with Austin Peay State University signed to be the main tenant and the Nashville Predators signed to manage the facility. The new arena is able to host basketball games, hockey games, concerts, and other events. The complex also features two ice rinks and a practice gym for Austin Peay Men's and Women's Basketball.

Austin Peay, the Nashville Predators, and Clarksville-Montgomery County broke ground on F&M Bank Arena in Nov. 2020. The ceremony was celebrated by Montgomery County Mayor Jim Durrett, Clarksville Mayor Joe Pitts, Austin Peay Vice President and Director of Athletics Gerald Harrison, and Nashville Predators Vice President Danny Butler breaking ground at the previously named Montgomery County Multi-Purpose Event Center.

Sabertooth Sports and Entertainment, which is owned by the Nashville Predators, operates the arena. On July 30, 2021, F&M Bank officially agreed to a naming rights deal for the Arena.

Construction was completed by January 2023, with the arena officially holding its Grand Opening Celebration July 15, 2023.

The arena is part of a broader revitalization project of downtown Clarksville. Across the street from the arena, a three-story restaurant development called Shelby's Trio was built, consisting of a rooftop bar and two restaurants. Set to be built behind the arena is Riverview Square, which will consist of restaurants and shops, as well as the completed renovation of the Riverview Inn, which became a DoubleTree by Hilton hotel. A parking garage was completed in 2025 as part of this development.

Ford Ice Center which operates year-round will be the home of Austin Peay's new club hockey team.

On May 18, 2024, the arena hosted its first Arena Football League game when the Nashville Kats hosted the Wichita Regulators. It was again enlisted to host a Kats home game in 2025, by which point the Kats were in Arena Football One, after the Kats' game against the Corpus Christi Tritons was rescheduled due to turmoil within the Tritons organization. The arena hosted the Kats' home playoff game. The Kats will call the arena home in 2026 with their future at the arena beyond this season unknown .

After he cancelled his visit to the Alabama-Georgia football game due to Hurricane Isaias, President Donald Trump scheduled a rally to support Tennessee Republicans ahead of the 2026 midterms. The rally was held on October 10, 2026.
