= 2023–24 Tennessee Lady Volunteers basketball team =

Intercollegiate basketball season

2023–24 Tennessee Lady Volunteers basketball

NCAA tournament, Second round
- Conference: Southeastern Conference
- Record: 20–13 (10–6 SEC)
- Head coach: Kellie Harper (5th season)
- Assistant coaches: Samantha Willams; Jon Harper; Joy McCorvey
- Home arena: Thompson–Boling Arena

2023–24 SEC women's basketball standings
	Conf.				Overall
Team	W		L	PCT	W		L	PCT
No. 1 South Carolina †	16	–	0	1.000	38	–	0	1.000
No. 6 LSU	13	–	3	.813	31	–	6	.838
Ole Miss	12	–	4	.750	24	–	9	.727
Alabama	10	–	6	.625	24	–	10	.706
Tennessee	10	–	6	.625	20	–	13	.606
Vanderbilt	9	–	7	.563	23	–	10	.697
Mississippi State	8	–	8	.500	23	–	12	.657
Auburn	8	–	8	.500	20	–	12	.625
Texas A&M	6	–	10	.375	19	–	13	.594
Arkansas	6	–	10	.375	18	–	15	.545
Florida	5	–	11	.313	16	–	16	.500
Kentucky	4	–	12	.250	12	–	20	.375
Georgia	3	–	13	.188	12	–	18	.400
Missouri	2	–	14	.125	11	–	19	.367
† 2024 SEC tournament winner Rankings from AP poll

The 2023–24 Tennessee Lady Volunteers basketball team represented the University of Tennessee in the 2023–24 college basketball season. Led by former Lady Vol Kellie Harper, in her fifth year as head coach, the team played their games at Thompson–Boling Arena as members of the Southeastern Conference.

The Lady Vols finished the season with a 20–13 overall record, 10–6 in the conference. They received a bye in the SEC tournament and advanced to the semifinals, where they lost by one point to South Carolina. The Lady Vols earned an at-large bid to the NCAA tournament, advancing to the second round before losing to North Carolina State.

On April 1, 2024, Tennessee announced that Harper was fired after five seasons.

On April 15, 2024, senior Rickea Jackson was selected by the Los Angeles Sparks, via the Seattle Storm, as the #4 overall pick in the 2024 WNBA draft.

== Previous season ==
The 2022–23 team finished the season with a 25–12 overall record, 13–3 in the conference. They advanced to the finals of the SEC tournament, where they lost to South Carolina. Finishing strong in the conference, the Lady Vols earned an at-large bid to the NCAA tournament, advancing to the Sweet Sixteen before losing to Virginia Tech.

== Offseason ==
=== Departures ===
Departures
Name	Number	Pos.	Height	Year	Hometown	Reason for departure
Jasmine Franklin	14	F	6'1"	Graduate senior	Fayetteville, AR	Graduated
Jordan Horston	25	G	6'2"	Senior	Columbus, OH	Graduated/2023 WNBA draft; selected 9th overall by Seattle Storm
Brooklynn Miles	0	G	5'4"	Sophomore	Frankfort, KY	Transferred to Kentucky
Justine Pissott	13	G/F	6'4"	Freshman	Toms River, NJ	Transferred to Vanderbilt
Jessie Rennie	10	G	5'8"	Senior	Bendigo, Australia	Graduated
Marta Suárez	33	G/F	6'3"	Redshirt sophomore	Oviedo, Spain	Transferred to California
Jordan Walker	4	G	5'8"	Graduate student	Muskegon, MI	Graduated

=== Incoming transfers ===
Incoming transfers
Name	Number	Pos.	Height	Year	Hometown	Previous school
Talaysia Cooper	55	G	6'0"	Sophomore	Turbeville, SC	South Carolina
Jewel Spear	0	G	5'10"	Senior	The Colony, TX	Wake Forest
Avery Strickland	13	G/F	5'10"	Sophomore	Knoxville, TN	Pittsburgh
Destinee Wells	10	G	5'6"	Senior	Lakeland, TN	Belmont

== Roster ==
2023–24 Tennessee Lady Volunteers women's basketball team
Players
Coaches

Pos.	#	Name	Height	Year	Previous school	Hometown
G	0	Jewel Spear	5 ft 10 in (1.78 m)	Sr	Wake Forest University	The Colony, TX
G/F	1	Sara Puckett	6 ft 2 in (1.88 m)	Jr	Muscle Shoals HS	Muscle Shoals, AL
F	2	Rickea Jackson	6 ft 2 in (1.88 m)	Sr	Mississippi State University	Detroit, MI
G	5	Kaiya Wynn	6 ft 0 in (1.83 m)	Jr	Foster HS	Richmond, TX
G	10	Destinee Wells	5 ft 6 in (1.68 m)	Sr	Belmont University	Lakeland, TN
F	11	Karoline Striplin	6 ft 3 in (1.91 m)	Jr	Geneva HS	Hartford, AL
G	12	Edie Darby	5 ft 7 in (1.7 m)	So	Greenfield HS	Greenfield, TN
G/F	13	Avery Strickland	5 ft 10 in (1.78 m)	So	University of Pittsburgh	Knoxville, TN
G	15	Jasmine Powell	5 ft 6 in (1.68 m)	Sr	University of Minnesota	Detroit, MI
C	20	Tamari Key	6 ft 5 in (1.96 m)	RS Sr	Cary HS	Cary, NC
G/F	21	Tess Darby	6 ft 1 in (1.85 m)	Sr	Greenfield HS	Greenfield, TN
F	53	Jillian Hollingshead	6 ft 5 in (1.96 m)	Jr	University of Georgia	Gainesville, GA
G	55	Talaysia Cooper	6 ft 0 in (1.83 m)	So	University of South Carolina	Turbeville, SC

Head coach

- Kellie Harper (Tennessee)

Assistant coach(es)

- Samantha Williams (Auburn)
- Jon Harper (Auburn)
- Joy McCorvey (St. John's)

Legend

- (C) Team captain
- (S) Suspended
- (I) Ineligible
- (W) Walk-on
- Injured
- Current redshirt

Roster

== Schedule and results ==
Date time, TV	Rank^{#}	Opponent^{#}	Result	Record	High points	High rebounds	High assists	Site (attendance) city, state
Exhibition
10/30/2023*; 6:30 p.m., SECN+	No. 11	Carson–Newman	W 105–72		17 – Jackson	8 – Tied	6 – Wells	Thompson–Boling Arena (7,819); Knoxville, TN
11/5/2023*; 6:00 p.m., SECN	No. 11	USA Women's National Team	L 59–95		15 – Jackson	7 – Powell	3 – Wynn	Thompson–Boling Arena (6,179); Knoxville, TN
Non-conference regular season
11/7/2023*; 6:30 p.m., SECN+	No. 11	Florida A&M	W 93–64	1–0	20 – Tied	12 – Hollingshead	6 – Wells	Thompson–Boling Arena (7,684); Knoxville, TN
11/9/2023*; 6:00 p.m., ESPN2	No. 11	at No. 18 Florida State	L 91–92	1–1	31 – Jackson	17 – Jackson	4 – Jackson	Donald L. Tucker Center (2,898); Tallahassee, FL
11/13/2023*; 6:30 p.m., SECN+	No. 15	Memphis	W 84–74 ^{OT}	2–1	24 – Puckett	12 – Spear	3 – Spear	Thompson–Boling Arena (7,729); Knoxville, TN
11/19/2023*; 2:00 p.m., SECN+	No. 15	Troy	W 100–73	3–1	19 – Striplin	14 – Striplin	8 – Wells	Thompson–Boling Arena (7,782); Knoxville, TN
11/23/2023*; 6:00 p.m., FOX	No. 19	vs. No. 21 Indiana; Fort Myers Tip-Off	L 57–71	3–2	13 – Tied	7 – Puckett	3 – Wells	Suncoast Credit Union Arena (1,314); Fort Myers, FL
11/25/2023*; 1:30 p.m.	No. 19	vs. No. 22 Oklahoma; Fort Myers Tip-Off	W 76–73	4–2	19 – Powell	8 – Tied	3 – Spear	Suncoast Credit Union Arena (478); Fort Myers, FL
11/29/2023*; 5:00 p.m., ESPN2	No. 20	No. 18 Notre Dame; ACC–SEC Challenge	L 69–74	4–3	14 – Powell	7 – Powell	5 – Wells	Thompson–Boling Arena (8,211); Knoxville, TN
12/3/2023*; 5:00 p.m., ESPN	No. 20	No. 16 Ohio State; Jimmy V Classic	L 58–78	4–4	11 – Wells	7 – Hollingshead	3 – Tied	Thompson–Boling Arena (8,723); Knoxville, TN
12/6/2023*; 7:30 p.m., ESPN+		vs. Middle Tennessee	L 62–73	4–5	29 – Striplin	6 – Tied	4 – Powell	Spragins Hall (5,015); Huntsville, AL
12/10/2023*; 2:00 p.m., SECN+		Eastern Kentucky	W 72–63	5–5	17 – Striplin	9 – Hollingshead	5 – Powell	Thompson–Boling Arena (7,785); Knoxville, TN
12/19/2023*; 6:30 p.m., SECN+		Wofford	W 85–63	6–5	18 – Spear	10 – Hollingshead	10 – Powell	Thompson–Boling Arena (7,900); Knoxville, TN
12/31/2023*; 2:00 p.m., ESPN+		at Liberty	W 90–55	7–5	21 – Jackson	7 – Tied	7 – Wynn	Liberty Arena (2,105); Lynchburg, VA
SEC regular season
1/4/2024; 8:00 p.m., SECN+		at Auburn	W 75–65	8–5 (1–0)	24 – Jackson	19 – Jackson	6 – Wynn	Neville Arena; Auburn, AL
1/7/2024; 12:00 p.m., SECN		Kentucky; Rivalry	W 87–69	9–5 (2–0)	27 – Jackson	7 – Tied	9 – Powell	Thompson–Boling Arena (8,823); Knoxville, TN
1/11/2024; 7:00 p.m., SECN		Florida	W 88–81	10–5 (3–0)	20 – Tied	8 – Tied	4 – Powell	Thompson–Boling Arena (7,605); Knoxville, TN
1/14/2024; 5:00 p.m., ESPN		at Texas A&M	L 56–71	10–6 (3–1)	12 – Puckett	7 – Puckett	5 – Puckett	Reed Arena (4,785); College Station, TX
1/18/2024; 7:00 p.m., SECN		at Mississippi State	W 75–64	11–6 (4–1)	19 – Jackson	7 – Jackson	7 – Powell	Humphrey Coliseum (5,507); Starkville, MS
1/21/2024; 3:00 p.m., SECN		Vanderbilt; Rivalry	W 73–64	12–6 (5–1)	16 – Jackson	10 – Jackson	8 – Powell	Thompson–Boling Arena (9,088); Knoxville, TN
1/28/2024; 3:00 p.m., ESPN		at Ole Miss	L 75–80	12–7 (5–2)	30 – Spear	6 – Jackson	6 – Powell	SJB Pavilion (3,863); Oxford, MS
2/1/2024; 7:00 p.m., SECN		at Georgia	W 95–73	13–7 (6–2)	25 – Spear	8 – Key	9 – Powell	Stegeman Coliseum (2,596); Athens, GA
2/4/2024; 2:00 p.m., SECN+		Missouri	W 80–69	14–7 (7–2)	22 – Spear	6 – Spear	6 – Tied	Thompson–Boling Arena (9,190); Knoxville, TN
2/8/2024; 7:00 p.m., SECN+		at Alabama	L 56–72	14–8 (7–3)	13 – Jackson	7 – Key	3 – Tied	Coleman Coliseum (2,655); Tuscaloosa, AL
2/12/2024; 7:00 p.m., SECN		Arkansas	W 81–55	15–8 (8–3)	21 – Jackson	10 – Hollingshead	7 – Spear	Thompson–Boling Arena (8,161); Knoxville, TN
2/15/2024; 7:00 p.m., ESPN		No. 1 South Carolina	L 55–66	15–9 (8–4)	19 – Jackson	8 – Powell	3 – Jackson	Thompson–Boling Arena (11,073); Knoxville, TN
2/18/2024; 2:00 p.m., SECN		at Vanderbilt; Rivalry	W 86–61	16–9 (9–4)	24 – Jackson	7 – Jackson	4 – Jackson	Memorial Gymnasium (6,259); Nashville, TN
2/25/2024; 12:00 p.m., ESPN		No. 13 LSU	L 60–75	16–10 (9–5)	16 – Jackson	9 – Jackson	6 – Powell	Thompson–Boling Arena (15,261); Knoxville, TN
2/29/2024; 7:00 p.m., SECN		Texas A&M	W 75–66	17–10 (10–5)	27 – Jackson	7 – Key	6 – Powell	Thompson–Boling Arena (8,161); Knoxville, TN
3/3/2024; 12:00 p.m., ESPN		at No. 1 South Carolina	L 68–76	17–11 (10–6)	29 – Jackson	8 – Jackson	3 – Powell	Colonial Life Arena (18,000); Columbia, SC
SEC tournament
3/7/2024; 2:30 p.m., SECN	(5)	vs. (12) Kentucky; Second Round / Rivalry	W 76–62	18–11	22 – Puckett	11 – Darby	4 – Powell	Bon Secours Wellness Arena (6,144); Greenville, SC
3/8/2024; 2:30 p.m., SECN	(5)	vs. (4) Alabama; Quarterfinals	W 83–61	19–11	24 – Spear	9 – Jackson	6 – Wynn	Bon Secours Wellness Arena (8,841); Greenville, SC
3/9/2024; 4:30 p.m., ESPNU	(5)	vs. (1) No. 1 South Carolina; Semifinals	L 73–74	19–12	22 – Jackson	9 – Jackson	8 – Jackson	Bon Secours Wellness Arena (12,784); Greenville, SC
NCAA tournament
3/23/2024*; 12:00 p.m., ESPN	(6 P4)	vs. (11 P4) Green Bay; First Round	W 92–63	20–12	26 – Johnson	9 – Johnson	6 – Powell	Reynolds Coliseum; Raleigh, NC
3/25/2024*; 4:00 p.m., ESPN	(6 P4)	at (3 P4) No. 11 NC State; Second Round	L 72–79	20–13	33 – Jackson	10 – Jackson	7 – Powell	Reynolds Coliseum (4,803); Raleigh, NC
*Non-conference game. ^{#}Rankings from AP Poll. (#) Tournament seedings in parentheses. P4=Portland 4. All times are in Eastern Time. 2023–24 Schedule

== Rankings ==
Ranking movements Legend: ██ Increase in ranking ██ Decrease in ranking — = Not ranked RV = Received votes
	Week																				
Poll	Pre	1	2	3	4	5	6	7	8	9	10	11	12	13	14	15	16	17	18	19	Final
AP	11	15	19	20	RV	—	—	—	—	—	—	—	—	RV	RV	RV	—	—	RV	RV	Not released
Coaches	12	20	21	22	RV	—	—	—	—	—	—	RV	—	RV	RV	RV	RV	RV	RV	RV	
