= 2023–24 Georgia Lady Bulldogs basketball team =

Intercollegiate basketball season

2023–24 Georgia Lady Bulldogs basketball

Baha Mar Pink Flamingo Champions
- Conference: Southeastern Conference
- Record: 12–18 (3–13 SEC)
- Head coach: Katie Abrahamson-Henderson (2nd season)
- Associate head coach: Tahnee Balerio
- Assistant coaches: Isoken Uzamere; Nykesha Sales
- Home arena: Stegeman Coliseum

2023–24 SEC women's basketball standings
| | Conf. | | | | Overall |
| Team | W | | L | PCT | W | | L | PCT |
|---|---|---|---|---|---|---|---|---|
| No. 1 South Carolina † | 16 | – | 0 | 1.000 | 38 | – | 0 | 1.000 |
| No. 6 LSU | 13 | – | 3 | .813 | 31 | – | 6 | .838 |
| Ole Miss | 12 | – | 4 | .750 | 24 | – | 9 | .727 |
| Alabama | 10 | – | 6 | .625 | 24 | – | 10 | .706 |
| Tennessee | 10 | – | 6 | .625 | 20 | – | 13 | .606 |
| Vanderbilt | 9 | – | 7 | .563 | 23 | – | 10 | .697 |
| Mississippi State | 8 | – | 8 | .500 | 23 | – | 12 | .657 |
| Auburn | 8 | – | 8 | .500 | 20 | – | 12 | .625 |
| Texas A&M | 6 | – | 10 | .375 | 19 | – | 13 | .594 |
| Arkansas | 6 | – | 10 | .375 | 18 | – | 15 | .545 |
| Florida | 5 | – | 11 | .313 | 16 | – | 16 | .500 |
| Kentucky | 4 | – | 12 | .250 | 12 | – | 20 | .375 |
| Georgia | 3 | – | 13 | .188 | 12 | – | 18 | .400 |
| Missouri | 2 | – | 14 | .125 | 11 | – | 19 | .367 |
† 2024 SEC tournament winner Rankings from AP poll

The 2023–24 Georgia Lady Bulldogs basketball team represented the University of Georgia during the 2023–24 NCAA Division I women's basketball season. The Lady Bulldogs, were led by second-year head coach Katie Abrahamson-Henderson and played their home games at Stegeman Coliseum as members of the Southeastern Conference (SEC).

== Previous season ==
The Lady Bulldogs finished the 2022–23 season 22–12, 9–7 in SEC play, to finish in three-way tie for fifth place. They defeated Auburn in the second round of the SEC tournament, before falling to LSU in the semifinals. They received an at-large bid into the NCAA tournament, receiving the #10 seed in the Seattle Regional 4. They upset #7 region seed Florida State in the first round, before falling to #2 region seed and eventual tournament runner-up Iowa in the second round.

== Roster ==
2023–24 Georgia Lady Bulldogs women's basketball team
Players
Coaches

| Pos. | # | Name | Height | Year | Previous school | Hometown |
|---|---|---|---|---|---|---|
| F | 0 | Zoesha Smith | 6 ft 1 in (1.85 m) | Sr | Glynn Academy | Brunswick, GA |
| G | 1 | Chloe Chapman | 5 ft 7 in (1.7 m) | Sr | Our Lady of Good Counsel High School | Mitchellville, MD |
| G | 2 | Savannah Henderson | 6 ft 3 in (1.91 m) | RS Fr | Timber Creek High School | Orlando, FL |
| F | 4 | Miyah Verse (redshirt) | 6 ft 1 in (1.85 m) | Fr | Arizona Elite Prep | Peoria, AZ |
| G | 10 | De'Mauri Flournoy | 5 ft 8 in (1.73 m) | Jr | Vanderbilt | Villa Rica, GA |
| G | 11 | Asia Avinger | 5 ft 7 in (1.7 m) | Jr | San Diego State | Cerritos, CA |
| G | 12 | Taniyah Thompson | 5 ft 11 in (1.8 m) | Sr | Penn State | Hamden, CT |
| G | 13 | Stefanie Ingram | 5 ft 8 in (1.73 m) | RS Fr | Lake Highland Prep | Orlando, FL |
| F | 20 | Jordan Cole | 6 ft 0 in (1.83 m) | Sr | St. Francis School | Alpharetta, GA |
| F/C | 21 | Fatima Diakhate | 6 ft 5 in (1.96 m) | RS Fr | Montverde Academy | Dakar, Senegal |
| F | 30 | Amiya Evans | 6 ft 2 in (1.88 m) | So | DME Academy | Pensacola, FL |
| F | 33 | Destiny Thomas | 6 ft 2 in (1.88 m) | Sr | UCF | Atlanta, GA |
| F | 35 | Javyn Nicholson | 6 ft 2 in (1.88 m) | Sr | Collins Hill High School | Lawrenceville, GA |

Head coach

- Katie Abrahamson-Henderson (Iowa)

Assistant coach(es)

- Tahnee Balerio (Missouri State)
- Isoken Uzamere (Hofstra)
- Nykesha Sales (Connecticut)

Legend

- (C) Team captain
- (S) Suspended
- (I) Ineligible
- (W) Walk-on
- Injured
- Current redshirt

Roster
Last update: March 20, 2024

== Schedule and results ==
| Date time, TV | Rank^{#} | Opponent^{#} | Result | Record | Site (attendance) city, state |
Non-conference regular season
| November 6, 2023*; 7:00 p.m., SECN+ | | North Carolina A&T | W 71–59 | 1–0 | Stegeman Coliseum (2,116); Athens, GA |
| November 10, 2023*; 7:30 p.m., ESPN+ | | at Belmont | L 50–76 | 1–1 | Curb Event Center (1,203); Nashville, TN |
| November 13, 2023*; 7:00 p.m., SECN+ | | Georgia Southern | W 85–59 | 2–1 | Stegeman Coliseum (2,109); Athens, GA |
| November 16, 2023*; 7:00 p.m., ESPN+ | | at Mercer | W 77–57 | 3–1 | Hawkins Arena (2,372); Macon, GA |
| November 20, 2023*; 11:00 a.m., FloSports | | vs. Columbia; Baha Mar Pink Flamingo Championship | W 73–56 | 4–1 | Baha Mar Convention Center (239); Nassau, Bahamas |
| November 22, 2023*; 4:00 p.m., FloSports | | vs. Purdue; Baha Mar Pink Flamingo Championship | W 65–57 | 5–1 | Baha Mar Convention Center (278); Nassau, Bahamas |
| November 30, 2023*; 5:00 p.m., SECN | | Duke; ACC–SEC Challenge | L 65–72 ^{OT} | 5–2 | Stegeman Coliseum (2,446); Athens, GA |
| December 3, 2023*; 2:00 p.m., SECN+ | | Furman | W 85–55 | 6–2 | Stegeman Coliseum (2,944); Athens, GA |
| December 6, 2023*; 11:00 a.m., SECN+ | | Troy | W 86–70 | 7–2 | Stegeman Coliseum (4,221); Athens, GA |
| December 16, 2023*; 1:30 p.m., SECN+ | | Georgia Tech; Rivalry | L 53–64 | 7–3 | Stegeman Coliseum (3,744); Athens, GA |
| December 20, 2023*; 12:00 p.m., SECN+ | | vs. Pittsburgh; Sun Coast Tournament | W 65–59 | 8–3 | Pasco–Hernando State College (133); Tampa, FL |
| December 21, 2023*; 12:00 p.m., SECN+ | | vs. Ball State; Sun Coast Tournament | L 51–52 | 8–4 | Pasco–Hernando State College (123); Tampa, FL |
| December 30, 2023*; 2:00 p.m., SECN+ | | Wofford | W 76–57 | 9–4 | Stegeman Coliseum (2,406); Athens, GA |
SEC regular season
| January 4, 2024; 7:00 p.m., SECN+ | | Texas A&M | W 54–50 | 10–4 (1–0) | Stegeman Coliseum (3,425); Athens, GA |
| January 7, 2024; 2:00 p.m., SECN | | at Arkansas | L 43–83 | 10–5 (1–1) | Bud Walton Arena (3,993); Fayetteville, AR |
| January 11, 2024; 7:00 p.m., SECN+ | | Alabama | L 63–81 | 10–6 (1–2) | Stegeman Coliseum (2,641); Athens, GA |
| January 14, 2024; 2:00 p.m., SECN+ | | at Florida | L 69–78 | 10–7 (1–3) | O'Connell Center (2,324); Gainesville, FL |
| January 18, 2024; 8:00 p.m., SECN+ | | at Missouri | L 57–69 | 10–8 (1–4) | Mizzou Arena (3,836); Columbia, MO |
| January 21, 2024; 1:00 p.m., SECN | | Ole Miss | L 59–69 | 10–9 (1–5) | Stegeman Coliseum; Athens, GA |
| January 29, 2024; 7:00 p.m., SECN | | at Auburn | L 49–67 | 10–10 (1–6) | Neville Arena (3,165); Auburn, AL |
| February 1, 2024; 7:00 p.m., SECN | | Tennessee | L 73–95 | 10–11 (1–7) | Stegeman Coliseum (2,596); Athens, GA |
| February 4, 2024; 12:00 p.m., SECN | | Kentucky | W 72–65 | 11–11 (2–7) | Stegeman Coliseum (3,177); Athens, GA |
| February 8, 2024; 7:30 p.m., SECN+ | | at Mississippi State | L 57–76 | 11–12 (2–8) | Humphrey Coliseum (6,137); Starkville, MS |
| February 11, 2024; 12:00 p.m., SECN | | Vanderbilt | L 55–61 | 11–13 (2–9) | Stegeman Coliseum (3,187); Athens, GA |
| February 18, 2024; 1:00 p.m., ABC | | at No. 1 South Carolina; College GameDay | L 56–70 | 11–14 (2–10) | Colonial Life Arena (18,478); Columbia, SC |
| February 22, 2024; 7:30 p.m., SECN+ | | at Ole Miss | L 51–73 | 11–15 (2–11) | SJB Pavilion (2,505); Oxford, MS |
| February 25, 2024; 1:00 p.m., SECN | | Florida | W 76–60 | 12–15 (3–11) | Stegeman Coliseum (3,802); Athens, GA |
| February 29, 2024; 9:00 p.m., ESPN2 | | No. 9 LSU | L 54–80 | 12–16 (3–12) | Stegeman Coliseum (7,406); Athens, GA |
| March 3, 2024; 2:00 p.m., SECN+ | | at Vanderbilt | L 55–72 | 12–17 (3–13) | Memorial Gymnasium (3,739); Nashville, TN |
SEC tournament
| March 6, 2024; 11:00 a.m., SECN | (13) | vs. (12) Kentucky; First round | L 50–64 | 12–18 | Bon Secours Wellness Arena (8,409); Greenville, SC |
*Non-conference game. ^{#}Rankings from AP poll. (#) Tournament seedings in parentheses. All times are in Eastern Time.

== See also ==
- 2023–24 Georgia Bulldogs basketball team
