= 2023–24 Florida Gators women's basketball team =

Intercollegiate basketball season

2023–24 Florida Gators women's basketball

WBIT, First Round
- Conference: Southeastern Conference
- Record: 16–16 (5–11 SEC)
- Head coach: Kelly Rae Finley (3rd season)
- Associate head coach: Tamisha Augustin
- Assistant coaches: Cynthia Jordan; Jackie Moore
- Home arena: O'Connell Center

2023–24 SEC women's basketball standings
	Conf.				Overall
Team	W		L	PCT	W		L	PCT
No. 1 South Carolina †	16	–	0	1.000	38	–	0	1.000
No. 6 LSU	13	–	3	.813	31	–	6	.838
Ole Miss	12	–	4	.750	24	–	9	.727
Alabama	10	–	6	.625	24	–	10	.706
Tennessee	10	–	6	.625	20	–	13	.606
Vanderbilt	9	–	7	.563	23	–	10	.697
Mississippi State	8	–	8	.500	23	–	12	.657
Auburn	8	–	8	.500	20	–	12	.625
Texas A&M	6	–	10	.375	19	–	13	.594
Arkansas	6	–	10	.375	18	–	15	.545
Florida	5	–	11	.313	16	–	16	.500
Kentucky	4	–	12	.250	12	–	20	.375
Georgia	3	–	13	.188	12	–	18	.400
Missouri	2	–	14	.125	11	–	19	.367
† 2024 SEC tournament winner Rankings from AP poll

The 2023–24 Florida Gators women's basketball team represented the University of Florida during the 2023–24 NCAA Division I women's basketball season. The Gators, were led by third-year head coach Kelly Rae Finley and played their home games at O'Connell Center as members of the Southeastern Conference (SEC).

== Previous season ==
The Gators finished the 2022–23 season 19–15, 5–11 in SEC play to finish in a tie for tenth place. They were upset by Kentucky in the first round of the SEC tournament. They received an at-large bid into the WNIT where they would defeat Wofford in the first round, Wake Forest in the second round, and Clemson in the Super 16, before falling to Bowling Green in the Great 8.

== Roster ==
2023–24 Florida Gators women's basketball team
Players
Coaches

Pos.	#	Name	Height	Year	Previous school	Hometown
G	2	Aliyah Matharu	5 ft 7 in (1.7 m)	Sr	Texas	Washington, D.C.
G	4	Zippy Broughton	5 ft 7 in (1.7 m)	Sr	Rutgers	Wetumpka, Alabama
G	5	Alberte Rimdal	5 ft 9 in (1.75 m)	Jr	Marselisborg Gymnasium	Køge, Denmark
G	6	Kenza Salgues	5 ft 9 in (1.75 m)	GS	Miami (FL)	Montpellier, France
F	9	Alexia Dizeko	5 ft 11 in (1.8 m)	Jr	South Georgia Technical College	Sion, Switzerland
G	13	Laila Reynolds	6 ft 1 in (1.85 m)	Fr	Shabach Christian Academy	Prince George's County, Maryland
G	20	Jeriah Warren	6 ft 0 in (1.83 m)	Jr	LaGrange High School	Lake Charles, Louisiana
F	21	Eriny Kindred	6 ft 0 in (1.83 m)	Jr	Texas A&M	Del Valle, Texas
F	22	Paige Clausen	6 ft 0 in (1.83 m)	Jr	Barron Collier High School	Naples, Florida
G	23	Leilani Correa	6 ft 0 in (1.83 m)	Sr	St. John's	Manchester, New Jersey
C	24	Ra Shaya Kyle	6 ft 6 in (1.98 m)	Sr	Purdue	Marion, Indiana
F	25	Faith Dut	6 ft 4 in (1.93 m)	Sr	Semiahmoo Secondary School	Vancouver, British Columbia

Head coach

- Kelly Rae Finley (Colorado State)

Assistant coach(es)

- Tamisha Augustin (Alabama A&M)
- Cynthia Jordan (Temple)
- Jackie Moore (Armstrong State)

Legend

- (C) Team captain
- (S) Suspended
- (I) Ineligible
- (W) Walk-on
- Injured
- Current redshirt

Roster
Last update: March 20, 2024

== Schedule and results ==
Date time, TV	Rank^{#}	Opponent^{#}	Result	Record	Site (attendance) city, state
Exhibition
November 1, 2023*; 6:00 p.m.		Florida Southern	W 93–43		O'Connell Center (736); Gainesville, FL
Non-conference regular season
November 6, 2023*; 5:30 p.m., SECN+		North Florida	W 82–65	1–0	O'Connell Center (1,112); Gainesville, FL
November 9, 2023*; 6:00 p.m., SECN+		Bethune–Cookman	W 83–69	2–0	O'Connell Center (943); Gainesville, FL
November 13, 2023*; 8:00 p.m., SECN		Florida A&M	W 92–54	3–0	O'Connell Center (1,137); Gainesville, FL
November 17, 2023*; 4:00 p.m., SECN+		No. 12 Florida State	L 75–79	3–1	O'Connell Center (1,518); Gainesville, FL
November 20, 2023*; 4:00 p.m., FloSports		vs. Purdue; Baha Mar Pink Flamingo Championship	W 52–49	4–1	Baha Mar Convention Center (437); Nassau, Bahamas
November 22, 2023*; 1:30 p.m., FloSports		vs. Columbia; Baha Mar Pink Flamingo Championship	W 83–81	5–1	Baha Mar Convention Center; Nassau, Bahamas
November 29, 2023*; 5:00 p.m., ACCN		at Georgia Tech; ACC–SEC Challenge	W 68–58	6–1	McCamish Pavilion (1,387); Atlanta, GA
December 2, 2023*; 1:00 p.m., ESPN+		at Marshall	L 88–91	6–2	Cam Henderson Center (1,186); Huntington, WV
December 10, 2023*; 3:00 p.m., ESPNU		at Tulsa	L 64–72	6–3	Reynolds Center (2,205); Tulsa, OK
December 17, 2023*; 3:00 p.m., ESPN+		at Gardner–Webb	W 115–37	7–3	Paul Porter Arena (270); Boiling Springs, NC
December 20, 2023*; 6:30 p.m., ESPN2		vs. Michigan; Jumpman Invitational	W 82–65	8–3	Spectrum Center (16,344); Charlotte, NC
December 30, 2023*; 3:45 p.m., SECN+		Winthrop	W 73–36	9–3	O'Connell Center (1,289); Gainesville, FL
SEC regular season
January 4, 2024; 7:00 p.m., SECN		No. 1 South Carolina	L 66–89	9–4 (0–1)	O'Connell Center (4,192); Gainesville, FL
January 7, 2024; 2:00 p.m., SECN+		at Vanderbilt	L 57–63	9–5 (0–2)	Memorial Gymnasium (4,737); Nashville, TN
January 11, 2024; 7:00 p.m., SECN		at Tennessee	L 81–88	9–6 (0–3)	Thompson–Boling Arena (7,605); Knoxville, TN
January 14, 2024; 2:00 p.m., SECN+		Georgia	W 78–69	10–6 (1–3)	O'Connell Center (2,324); Gainesville, FL
January 22, 2024; 7:00 p.m., SECN		Mississippi State	L 77–89	10–7 (1–4)	O'Connell Center (1,587); Gainesville, FL
January 25, 2024; 7:00 p.m., SECN		at Ole Miss	L 70–81	10–8 (1–5)	SJB Pavilion (2,450); Oxford, MS
January 28, 2024; 1:00 p.m., SECN		Texas A&M	W 63–51	11–8 (2–5)	O'Connell Center (1,460); Gainesville, FL
February 4, 2024; 2:00 p.m., SECN		at No. 9 LSU	L 66–106	11–9 (2–6)	Pete Maravich Assembly Center (12,707); Baton Rouge, LA
February 8, 2024; 6:00 p.m., SECN+		Arkansas	W 85–81	12–9 (3–6)	O'Connell Center (1,407); Gainesville, FL
February 11, 2024; 3:00 p.m., SECN+		at Mississippi State	W 90–70	13–9 (4–6)	Humphrey Coliseum (6,097); Starkville, MS
February 15, 2024; 6:00 p.m., SECN+		Ole Miss	L 67–77 ^{OT}	13–10 (4–7)	O'Connell Center (1,686); Gainesville, FL
February 18, 2024; 12:00 p.m., SECN		at Kentucky	L 77–81	13–11 (4–8)	Rupp Arena (4,692); Lexington, KY
February 22, 2024; 6:00 p.m., SECN+		Missouri	W 86-70	14–11 (5–8)	O'Connell Center (727); Gainesville, FL
February 25, 2024; 1:00 p.m., SECN		at Georgia	L 60–76	14–12 (5–9)	Stegeman Coliseum (3,802); Athens, GA
February 29, 2024; 7:00 p.m., SECN+		at Alabama	L 73–76	14–13 (5–10)	Coleman Coliseum (2,257); Tuscaloosa, AL
March 3, 2024; 12:00 p.m., SECN		Auburn	L 74–77	14–14 (5–11)	O'Connell Center (1,473); Gainesville, FL
SEC Tournament
March 6, 2024; 1:30 p.m., SECN	(11)	vs. (14) Missouri; First Round	W 66–60	15–14	Bon Secours Wellness Arena (8,409); Greenville, SC
March 6, 2024; 8:30 p.m., SECN	(11)	vs. (6) Vanderbilt; Second Round	W 62–59	16–14	Bon Secours Wellness Arena (7,187); Greenville, SC
March 7, 2024; 8:30 p.m., SECN	(11)	vs. (3) Ole Miss; Quarterfinals	L 74–84	16–15	Bon Secours Wellness Arena (8,377); Greenville, SC
WBIT
March 21, 2024*; 7:00 p.m., ESPN+	(3)	St. John's; First Round	L 60–79	16–16	O'Connell Center (503); Gainesville, FL
*Non-conference game. ^{#}Rankings from AP Poll. (#) Tournament seedings in parentheses. All times are in Eastern Time.

== See also ==
- 2023–24 Florida Gators men's basketball team
