= 2023–24 Arkansas Razorbacks women's basketball team =

Intercollegiate basketball season

2023–24 Arkansas Razorbacks women's basketball

West Palm Beach Classic champions

WBIT, First Round
- Conference: Southeastern Conference
- Record: 18–15 (6–10 SEC)
- Head coach: Mike Neighbors (7th season)
- Assistant coaches: Todd Schaefer; Lacey Goldwire; Pauline Love
- Home arena: Bud Walton Arena

2023–24 SEC women's basketball standings
	Conf.				Overall
Team	W		L	PCT	W		L	PCT
No. 1 South Carolina †	16	–	0	1.000	38	–	0	1.000
No. 6 LSU	13	–	3	.813	31	–	6	.838
Ole Miss	12	–	4	.750	24	–	9	.727
Alabama	10	–	6	.625	24	–	10	.706
Tennessee	10	–	6	.625	20	–	13	.606
Vanderbilt	9	–	7	.563	23	–	10	.697
Mississippi State	8	–	8	.500	23	–	12	.657
Auburn	8	–	8	.500	20	–	12	.625
Texas A&M	6	–	10	.375	19	–	13	.594
Arkansas	6	–	10	.375	18	–	15	.545
Florida	5	–	11	.313	16	–	16	.500
Kentucky	4	–	12	.250	12	–	20	.375
Georgia	3	–	13	.188	12	–	18	.400
Missouri	2	–	14	.125	11	–	19	.367
† 2024 SEC tournament winner Rankings from AP poll

The 2023–24 Arkansas Razorbacks women's basketball team represented the University of Arkansas during the 2023–24 NCAA Division I women's basketball season. The Razorbacks, led by seventh-year head coach Mike Neighbors, played their home games at Bud Walton Arena and competed as members of the Southeastern Conference (SEC).

== Previous season ==
The Razorbacks finished the season 24–13 (7–9 SEC) to finish in eighth in the SEC and received a bid to the WNIT, where they lost to Kansas in the Great Eight.

== Offseason ==
=== Departures ===
Arkansas Departures
Name	Number	Pos.	Height	Year	Hometown	Notes	Ref
Erynn Barnum	4	F	6'2"	RS Senior	Little Rock, AR	Transferred to Mississippi State	
Rylee Langerman	11	G	5'9"	Junior	Norman, OK	Transferred to Oklahoma State	
Avery Hughes	22	G	5'7"	Senior	Bentonville, AR	Graduated	
Chrissy Carr	34	G	6'1"	RS Senior	Eden Prairie, MN	Graduated	

=== 2023 recruiting class ===
College recruiting information
Name	Hometown	School	Height	Weight	Commit date
Taliah Scott; G	Orange Park, FL	St. Johns Country Day School	5 ft 9 in (1.75 m)	N/A	
Taliah Scott; G	Recruit ratings: ESPN: (97)				
Jenna Lawrence; F	Farmington, AR	Farmington HS	6 ft 3 in (1.91 m)	N/A	
Jenna Lawrence; F	Recruit ratings: ESPN: (93)				
Maryn Archer; G	Derby, KS	Derby HS	5 ft 7 in (1.70 m)	N/A	
Maryn Archer; G	Recruit ratings: No ratings found				
Cristina Sánchez Cerqueira; F	Granada, Spain	Segle XXI	6 ft 1 in (1.85 m)	N/A	
Cristina Sánchez Cerqueira; F	Recruit ratings: No ratings found				
Overall recruit ranking:
Note: In many cases, Scout, Rivals, 247Sports, On3, and ESPN may conflict in their listings of height and weight.; In these cases, the average was taken. ESPN grades are on a 100-point scale.; Sources:

=== Incoming transfer ===
Arkansas incoming transfers
Name	Number	Pos.	Height	Year	Hometown	Previous school
Carly Keats	23	G	5'8"	Sophomore	Choctaw, MS	Jones County Junior College

== Roster ==
2023–24 Arkansas Razorbacks women's basketball team
Players
Coaches

Pos.	#	Name	Height	Year	Previous school	Hometown
G	0	Taliah Scott	5 ft 9 in (1.75 m)	Fr	St. Johns Country Day School	Orange Park, FL (United States) (Florida)
G	2	Samara Spencer	5 ft 7 in (1.7 m)	Jr	St. Thomas Aquinas HS	Fort Lauderdale, FL (United States) (Florida)
G	4	Saylor Poffenbarger	6 ft 2 in (1.88 m)	RS So	Middletown HS; UConn	Middletown, MD (United States) (Maryland)
F	10	Cristina Sánchez Cerqueira	6 ft 1 in (1.85 m)	Fr	Segle XXI	Granada, Spain
G	13	Sasha Goforth	6 ft 1 in (1.85 m)	RS Jr	Fayetteville HS; Oregon State	Fayetteville, AR (United States) (Arkansas)
G	20	Karley Johnson	5 ft 9 in (1.75 m)	So	Mustang HS	Oklahoma City, OK (United States)
G	21	Loren Lindsey	5 ft 11 in (1.8 m)	So	Fayetteville HS	Fayetteville, AR (United States) (Arkansas)
G	23	Carly Keats	5 ft 8 in (1.73 m)	So	Neshoba Central HS; Jones County JC	Choctaw, MS (United States) (Mississippi)
F	30	Maryam Dauda	6 ft 4 in (1.93 m)	RS So	Bentonville HS	Bentonville, AR (United States) (Arkansas)
F	34	Jenna Lawrence	6 ft 3 in (1.91 m)	Fr	Farmington HS	Farmington, AR (United States) (Arkansas)
G	43	Makayla Daniels	5 ft 8 in (1.73 m)	GS	Frederick HS	Frederick, MD (United States) (Maryland)
G	44	Maryn Archer	5 ft 7 in (1.7 m)	Fr	Derby HS	Derby, KS (United States) (Kansas)
F	55	Emrie Ellis	6 ft 3 in (1.91 m)	Jr	Vanoss HS	Vanoss, OK (United States) (Oklahoma)

Head coach

- Mike Neighbors (Arkansas)

Assistant coach(es)

- Todd Schaefer (Thomas More)
- Lacey Goldwire (Oklahoma State)
- Pauline Love (Southern Miss)

Legend

- (C) Team captain
- (S) Suspended
- (I) Ineligible
- (W) Walk-on
- Injured
- Current redshirt

Roster

== Schedule ==
Date time, TV	Rank^{#}	Opponent^{#}	Result	Record	High points	High rebounds	High assists	Site (attendance) city, state
Non-conference regular season
November 7, 2023*; 7:00 p.m., SECN+		Louisiana–Monroe	W 81–76	1–0	29 – Scott	21 – Poffenbarger	2 – Spencer	Bud Walton Arena (2,630); Fayetteville, AR
November 10, 2023*; 10:30 a.m., SECN+		Murray State	W 82–79	2–0	25 – Scott	12 – Poffenbarger	7 – Spencer	Bud Walton Arena (11,026); Fayetteville, AR
November 14, 2023*; 7:00 p.m., SECN+		Little Rock	W 77–36	3–0	18 – Scott	8 – Poffenbarger	5 – Spencer	Bud Walton Arena (2,608); Fayetteville, AR
November 17, 2023*; 7:00 p.m., ESPN+		at Arkansas State rivalry	W 82–67	4–0	27 – Higginbottom	11 – Gillispie	3 – Pendleton	First National Bank Arena (3,208); Jonesboro, AR
November 20, 2023*; 7:00 p.m., SECN+		Central Arkansas	W 81–67	5–0	17 – Poffenbarger	8 – Dauda	4 – Daniels	Bud Walton Arena (4,194); Fayetteville, AR
November 24, 2023*; 1:00 p.m.		vs. Wisconsin; Fort Myers Tip-Off	W 65–62	6–0	22 – Daniels	11 – Dauda	3 – Tied	Suncoast Credit Union Arena; Fort Myers, FL
November 25, 2023*; 4:00 p.m.		vs. Marquette; Fort Myers Tip-Off	L 58–74	6–1	21 – Scott	7 – Poffenbarger	6 – Daniels	Suncoast Credit Union Arena (227); Fort Myers, FL
November 30, 2023*; 6:00 p.m., ESPN2		at No. 15 Florida State; ACC–SEC Challenge	W 71–58	7–1	24 – Scott	23 – Poffenbarger	6 – Spencer	Donald L. Tucker Civic Center (2,216); Tallahassee, FL
December 3, 2023*; 2:00 p.m., SECN+		No. 2 UCLA	L 66–81	7–2	23 – Scott	7 – Poffenbarger	2 – Dauda	Bud Walton Arena (4,261); Fayetteville, AR
December 7, 2023*; 7:00 p.m., SECN+		Louisiana Tech	W 100–60	8–2	29 – Scott	11 – Poffenbarger	7 – Daniels	Bud Walton Arena (2,599); Fayetteville, AR
December 10, 2023*; 1:00 p.m., SECN		Arkansas–Pine Bluff	L 70–74	8–3	31 – Scott	10 – Poffenbarger	4 – Daniels	Bud Walton Arena (3,330); Fayetteville, AR
December 16, 2023*; 12:30 p.m., SECN+		vs. Samford	W 68–54	9–3	20 – Spencer	13 – Poffenbarger	4 – Spencer	Simmons Bank Arena (2,513); North Little Rock, AR
December 20, 2023*; 10:00 a.m., FloHoops		vs. Illinois; West Palm Beach Classic	W 60–59	10–3	17 – Tied	19 – Poffenbarger	4 – Daniels	Massimino Court (313); West Palm Beach, FL
December 21, 2023*; 10:00 a.m., FloHoops		vs. UIC; West Palm Beach Classic	W 66–58	11–3	26 – Scott	11 – Poffenbarger	3 – Dauda	Massimino Court; West Palm Beach, FL
December 31, 2023*; 1:00 p.m., SECN+		Incarnate Word	W 67–48	12–3	24 – Scott	19 – Poffenbarger	4 – Scott	Bud Walton Arena (3,420); Fayetteville, AR
SEC regular season
January 4, 2024; 6:00 p.m., SECN+		at Kentucky	L 63–73	12–4 (0–1)	25 – Spencer	15 – Poffenbarger	3 – Spencer	Rupp Arena (2,998); Lexington, KY
January 7, 2024; 1:00 p.m., SECN		Georgia	W 83–43	13–4 (1–1)	24 – Daniels	17 – Poffenbarger	4 – Tied	Bud Walton Arena (3,993); Fayetteville, AR
January 11, 2024; 8:00 p.m., SECN		Mississippi State	L 63–66	13–5 (1–2)	17 – Dauda	13 – Dauda	6 – Spencer	Bud Walton Arena (2,627); Fayetteville, AR
January 14, 2024; 2:00 p.m., SECN		at Alabama	W 77–59	14–5 (2–2)	31 – Spencer	14 – Spencer	5 – Dauda	Coleman Coliseum (2,467); Tuscaloosa, AL
January 21, 2024; 4:00 p.m., ESPN		at No. 10 LSU	L 68–99	14–6 (2–3)	20 – Spencer	6 – Daniels	7 – Spencer	Pete Maravich Assembly Center (12,873); Baton Rouge, LA
January 25, 2024; 7:00 p.m., SECN+		Kentucky	W 88–61	15–6 (3–3)	22 – Daniels	7 – Tied	7 – Daniels	Bud Walton Arena (3,719); Fayetteville, AR
January 28, 2024; 2:00 p.m., SECN+		at Missouri	W 67–58	16–6 (4–3)	24 – Poffenbarger	9 – Poffenbarger	6 – Spencer	Mizzou Arena (4,968); Columbia, MO
February 1, 2024; 8:00 p.m., SECN		Alabama	L 70–86	16–7 (4–4)	23 – Poffenbarger	11 – Poffenbarger	5 – Daniels	Bud Walton Arena (2,756); Fayetteville, AR
February 4, 2024; 5:00 p.m., SECN		Auburn	W 74–72	17–7 (5–4)	33 – Scott	13 – Poffenbarger	5 – Spencer	Bud Walton Arena (4,450); Fayetteville, AR
February 8, 2024; 5:00 p.m., SECN+		at Florida	L 81–85	17–8 (5–5)	26 – Daniels	12 – Poffenbarger	4 – Spencer	O'Connell Center (1,407); Gainesville, FL
February 12, 2024; 6:00 p.m., SECN		at Tennessee	L 55–81	17–9 (5–6)	23 – Scott	7 – Poffenbarger	4 – Spencer	Thompson–Boling Arena (8,161); Knoxville, TN
February 18, 2024; 3:00 p.m., SECN		Missouri	W 75–68	18–9 (6–6)	18 – Dauda	11 – Poffenbarger	6 – Spencer	Bud Walton Arena (5,927); Fayetteville, AR
February 22, 2024; 7:00 p.m., SECN+		at Texas A&M	L 67–73	18–10 (6–7)	24 – Spencer	9 – Poffenbarger	3 – Daniels	Reed Arena (3,712); College Station, TX
February 25, 2024; 2:00 p.m., SECN+		Vanderbilt	L 53–62	18–11 (6–8)	19 – Spencer	12 – Poffenbarger	2 – Tied	Bud Walton Arena (3,839); Fayetteville, AR
February 29, 2024; 8:00 p.m., SECN		No. 1 South Carolina	L 61–98	18–12 (6–9)	19 – Dauda	6 – Lawrence	3 – Tied	Bud Walton Arena (3,891); Fayetteville, AR
March 3, 2024; 3:00 p.m., SECN		at Ole Miss	L 43–87	18–13 (6–10)	11 – Tied	6 – Poffenbarger	3 – Tied	SJB Pavilion (3,353); Oxford, MS
SEC Tournament
March 7, 2024; 5:00 p.m., SECN	(10)	vs. (7) Auburn; Second Round	L 48–67	18–14	13 – Tied	6 – Daniels	4 – Keats	Bon Secours Wellness Arena (7,187); Greenville, SC
WBIT
March 21, 2024*; 6:30 p.m., ESPN+		at (3) Tulsa; First Round	L 62–80	18–15	22 – Dauda	9 – Dauda	4 – Spencer	Reynolds Center (1,831); Tulsa, OK
*Non-conference game. ^{#}Rankings from AP Poll. (#) Tournament seedings in parentheses. All times are in Central Time.

== See also ==
- 2023–24 Arkansas Razorbacks men's basketball team
