= 2023–24 Georgia Tech Yellow Jackets women's basketball team =

Intercollegiate basketball season

2023–24 Georgia Tech Yellow Jackets women's basketball

WBIT, First Round
- Conference: Atlantic Coast Conference
- Record: 17–16 (7–11 ACC)
- Head coach: Nell Fortner (5th season)
- Assistant coaches: Blanche Alverson; LaSondra Barrett; Michael Scruggs; Caleb Currier
- Home arena: McCamish Pavilion

2023–24 ACC women's basketball standings
	Conf.				Overall
Team	W		L	PCT	W		L	PCT
No. 18 Virginia Tech	14	–	4	.778	25	–	8	.758
No. 4 NC State	13	–	5	.722	31	–	7	.816
No. 20 Syracuse	13	–	5	.722	24	–	8	.750
No. 11 Notre Dame †	13	–	5	.722	28	–	7	.800
Louisville	12	–	6	.667	24	–	10	.706
Florida State	12	–	6	.667	23	–	11	.676
No. 17 Duke	11	–	7	.611	22	–	12	.647
North Carolina	11	–	7	.611	20	–	13	.606
Miami (FL)	8	–	10	.444	19	–	12	.613
Georgia Tech	7	–	11	.389	17	–	16	.515
Virginia	7	–	11	.389	16	–	16	.500
Clemson	5	–	13	.278	12	–	19	.387
Boston College	5	–	13	.278	14	–	19	.424
Wake Forest	2	–	16	.111	7	–	25	.219
Pittsburgh	2	–	16	.111	8	–	24	.250
† 2024 ACC tournament winner Rankings from AP poll

The 2023–24 Georgia Tech Yellow Jackets women's basketball team represented the Georgia Institute of Technology during the 2023–24 NCAA Division I women's basketball season. They were led by fifth-year head coach Nell Fortner and played their home games at McCamish Pavilion as members of the Atlantic Coast Conference.

The season started with Georgia Tech winning their first four games, before splitting a pair of games in their early season tournament, the Cancún Challenge. The Yellow Jackets would lose their next two games, which were both against Power-5 foes, and included their ACC–SEC Challenge game. They finished their non-conference schedule with four straight wins, including their rivalry game against Georgia. They finished their non-conference schedule with a 9–3 record. The Yellow Jackets started their ACC schedule with a loss to ranked Florida State before winning their next three games. Of their next six games, they only won once, but four of those games were against ranked opponents. They finished by winning three of their last eight games. The last eight games were not without close games, as seven of the eight were decided by single digits and two games went to overtime. A highlight was the effort against number 6 NC State, as the Yellow Jackets forced overtime, but ultimately lost by one point.

The Yellow Jackets finished the season 17–16 overall and 7–11 in ACC play to finish in a tie for tenth place. As the tenth seed in the ACC tournament, they defeated fifteenth seed Pittsburgh in the First Round before losing to seventh seed Duke in the Second Round. They received an at-large invitation to the WBIT. They were defeated by second seed Mississippi State in the First Round to end their season.

== Previous season ==
The Yellow Jackets finished the season 13–17 overall and 4–14 in ACC play to finish in a tie for thirteenth place. As the fourteenth seed in the ACC tournament, they lost their First Round matchup with Boston College. They were not invited to the NCAA tournament or the WNIT.

== Off-season ==
=== Departures ===
Departures
Name	Number	Pos.	Height	Year	Hometown	Reason for departure
Cameron Swartz	1	G	5'11"	Graduate Student	Marietta, Georgia	Graduated
Bianca Jackson	10	G	5'11"	Graduate Student	Montgomery, Alabama	Graduated
Raeven Boswell	14	G	5'11"	Freshman	Austin, Texas	Transferred to Pittsburgh
Nerea Hermosa	20	C	6'5"	Senior	Victoria, Spain	Graduated
Eylia Love	24	G/F	6'1"	Junior	Kansas City, Missouri	Transferred to Louisville
Carmyn Harrison	33	F	6'2"	Sophomore	Memphis, Tennessee	Transferred to Belmont

=== Incoming transfers ===
Incoming transfers
Name	Number	Pos.	Height	Year	Hometown	Previous school
Caitlyn Wilson	1	G	5'10"	Graduate Student	Cordova, Tennessee	Cincinnati
Sydney Johnson	21	G	5'9"	Graduate Student	Powder Springs, Georgia	Boston University

=== Recruiting class ===
College recruiting
Name	Hometown	School	Height	Weight	Commit date
Jada Bediako; F/C	Brampton, Canada	Southwest Academy	6 ft 3 in (1.91 m)	N/A	
Jada Bediako; F/C	Recruit ratings: No ratings found				
Ariadna Termis; C	Zaragoza, Spain	IES Joaquín Blume	6 ft 6 in (1.98 m)	N/A	
Ariadna Termis; C	Recruit ratings: No ratings found				
Rusne Augustinaite; G	Šiauliai, Lithuania	Montverde Academy	6 ft 0 in (1.83 m)	N/A	
Rusne Augustinaite; G	Recruit ratings: No ratings found				
D'Asia Thomas-Harris; G/F	Katy, Texas	Houston Christian	6 ft 2 in (1.88 m)	N/A	
D'Asia Thomas-Harris; G/F	Recruit ratings: No ratings found				
Overall recruit ranking:
Note: In many cases, Scout, Rivals, 247Sports, On3, and ESPN may conflict in their listings of height and weight.; In these cases, the average was taken. ESPN grades are on a 100-point scale.; Sources:

== Roster ==
2023–24 Georgia Tech Yellow Jackets women's basketball team
Players
Coaches

Pos.	#	Name	Height	Year	Previous school	Hometown
G	1	Caitlyn Wilson	5 ft 10 in (1.78 m)	GS	Arlington; Cincinnati	Cordova, TN
G	4	Anisa Clark	5 ft 7 in (1.7 m)	Sr	Union Grove	McDonough, GA
G	5	Tonie Morgan	5 ft 9 in (1.75 m)	So	Florida High	Tallahassee, FL
F	11	Aixa Wone Aranaz	6 ft 3 in (1.91 m)	GS	Ohio State	Pamplona, Spain
F/C	12	Jada Bediako	6 ft 3 in (1.91 m)	Fr	Southwest Academy	Brampton, Canada
F	13	Kayla Blackshear	6 ft 1 in (1.85 m)	Jr	Lake Highland Preparatory School; Alabama	Orlando, FL
G	15	Avyonce Carter	5 ft 10 in (1.78 m)	Sr	Wesleyan	Norcross, GA
C	20	Ariadna Termis	6 ft 6 in (1.98 m)	Fr	IES Joaquín Blume	Zaragoza, Spain
G	21	Sydney Johnson	5 ft 9 in (1.75 m)	GS	Lovett School; Boston University	Powder Springs, GA
G	22	Inés Noguero Outeiral	5 ft 9 in (1.75 m)	So	IES Joaquín Blume	Gijón, Spain
G	23	Rusne Augustinaite	6 ft 0 in (1.83 m)	Fr	Montverde Academy	Šiauliai, Lithuania
G	25	Kara Dunn	5 ft 11 in (1.8 m)	So	Mount Paran Christian	Dallas, GA
G/F	32	D'Asia Thomas-Harris	6 ft 2 in (1.88 m)	Fr	Houston Christian	Katy, TX

Head coach

- Nell Fortner (Texas)

Assistant coach(es)

- Blanche Alverson (Auburn)
- LaSondra Barrett (LSU)
- Michael Scruggs (Tennessee)
- Caleb Currier (Tennessee)

Legend

- (C) Team captain
- (S) Suspended
- (I) Ineligible
- (W) Walk-on
- Injured
- Current redshirt

Roster
Last update: October 30, 2023

== Schedule ==
Date time, TV	Rank^{#}	Opponent^{#}	Result	Record	Site (attendance) city, state
Exhibition
November 2, 2023*; 7:00 p.m.		Georgia College	W 93–56	–	McCamish Pavilion (413); Atlanta, GA
Non-conference regular season
November 6, 2023*; 11:00 a.m., ACCNX		Coastal Carolina	W 83–53	1–0	McCamish Pavilion (4,963); Atlanta, GA
November 11, 2023*; 2:00 p.m., ACCNX		Furman	W 91–56	2–0	McCamish Pavilion (1,538); Atlanta, GA
November 16, 2023*; 8:00 p.m., ESPN+		at Rice	W 78–75	3–0	Tudor Fieldhouse (1,088); Houston, TX
November 19, 2023*; 2:00 p.m., ACCNX		Kennesaw State	W 77–38	4–0	McCamish Pavilion (1,957); Atlanta, GA
November 23, 2023*; 4:00 p.m., FloHoops		vs. Creighton; Cancún Challenge	L 46–57	4–1	Hard Rock Hotel Riviera Maya (137); Cancún, MX
November 24, 2023*; 6:30 p.m., FloHoops		vs. New Mexico; Cancún Challenge	W 66–55	5–1	Hard Rock Hotel Riviera Maya (150); Cancún, MX
November 29, 2023*; 5:00 p.m., ACCN		Florida; ACC–SEC Challenge	L 58–68	5–2	McCamish Pavilion (1,387); Atlanta, GA
December 2, 2023*; 3:00 p.m., BTN+		at Nebraska	L 72–80	5–3	Pinnacle Bank Arena (4,578); Lincoln, NE
December 5, 2023*; 7:00 p.m., ACCNX		Mercer	W 73–60	6–3	McCamish Pavilion (1,353); Atlanta, GA
December 10, 2023*; 2:00 p.m., ACCNX		Georgia State	W 94–70	7–3	McCamish Pavilion (1,727); Atlanta, GA
December 16, 2023*; 1:30 p.m., SECN+		at Georgia; Rivalry	W 64–53	8–3	Stegeman Coliseum (3,744); Athens, GA
December 20, 2023*; 2:00 p.m., ACCNX		USC Upstate	W 81–50	9–3	McCamish Pavilion (1,244); Atlanta, GA
ACC regular season
December 29, 2023; 2:00 p.m., ACCNX		at No. 22 Florida State	L 80–95	9–4 (0–1)	Donald L. Tucker Center (1,613); Tallahassee, FL
January 4, 2024; 7:00 p.m., ACCNX		Virginia	W 63–60	10–4 (1–1)	McCamish Pavilion (1,237); Atlanta, GA
January 7, 2024; 2:00 p.m., ACCNX		at Pittsburgh	W 68–58	11–4 (2–1)	Peterson Events Center (1,653); Pittsburgh, PA
January 11, 2024; 7:00 p.m., ACCNX		Clemson	W 70–62	12–4 (3–1)	McCamish Pavilion (1,319); Atlanta, GA
January 14, 2024; 2:00 p.m., ACCNX		at Duke	L 46–84	12–5 (3–2)	Cameron Indoor Stadium (2,362); Durham, NC
January 18, 2024; 6:00 p.m., ACCN		No. 23 North Carolina	L 68–73	12–6 (3–3)	McCamish Pavilion (1,605); Atlanta, GA
January 21, 2024; 2:00 p.m., ACCNX		Boston College	W 69–54	13–6 (4–3)	McCamish Pavilion (2,185); Atlanta, GA
January 25, 2024; 6:00 p.m., ACCNX		at No. 19 Virginia Tech	L 69–87	13–7 (4–4)	Cassell Coliseum (4,971); Blacksburg, VA
January 28, 2024; 4:00 p.m., ACCN		No. 23 Florida State	L 67–78	13–8 (4–5)	McCamish Pavilion (2,147); Atlanta, GA
February 1, 2024; 7:00 p.m., ACCNX		No. 14 Notre Dame	L 48–85	13–9 (4–6)	McCamish Pavilion (1,989); Atlanta, GA
February 4, 2024; 2:00 p.m., ACCNX		at Wake Forest	W 58–55	14–9 (5–6)	LJVM Coliseum (1,197); Winston-Salem, NC
February 8, 2024; 7:00 p.m., ACCNX		at No. 23 Syracuse	L 59–62	14–10 (5–7)	JMA Wireless Dome (2,603); Syracuse, NY
February 11, 2024; 2:00 p.m., ACCNX		Miami (FL)	L 60–62	14–11 (5–8)	McCamish Pavilion (2,214); Atlanta, GA
February 15, 2024; 7:00 p.m., ACCNX		at Clemson	W 64–63	15–11 (6–8)	Littlejohn Coliseum (852); Clemson, SC
February 18, 2024; 12:00 p.m., The CW		at No. 6 NC State	L 85–86 ^{OT}	15–12 (6–9)	Reynolds Coliseum (5,500); Raleigh, NC
February 22, 2024; 6:00 p.m., ACCN		No. 20 Louisville	L 62–80	15–13 (6–10)	McCamish Pavilion (1,554); Atlanta, GA
February 25, 2024; 2:00 p.m., ACCNX		Wake Forest	L 66–71	15–14 (6–11)	McCamish Pavilion (1,823); Atlanta, GA
March 3, 2024; 2:00 p.m., ACCN		at Miami (FL)	W 71–66 ^{OT}	16–14 (7–11)	Watsco Center (2,739); Coral Gables, FL
ACC Women's Tournament
March 6, 2024; 3:30 p.m., ACCN	(10)	vs. (15) Pittsburgh; First Round	W 73–60	17–14	Greensboro Coliseum (6,322); Greensboro, NC
March 7, 2024; 5:00 p.m., ACCN	(10)	vs. (7) Duke; Second Round	L 58–70	17–15	Greensboro Coliseum (7,424); Greensboro, NC
WBIT
March 21, 2024*; 6:30 p.m., ESPN+		at (2) Mississippi State; First Round	L 47–84	17–16	Humphrey Coliseum (1,683); Starkville, MS
*Non-conference game. ^{#}Rankings from AP Poll. (#) Tournament seedings in parentheses. All times are in Eastern Time.

== Rankings ==
+ Regular season polls	Poll	Pre- Season	Week 2	Week 3	Week 4	Week 5	Week 6	Week 7	Week 8	Week 9	Week 10	Week 11	Week 12	Week 13	Week 14	Week 15	Week 16	Week 17	Week 18	Week 19	Week 20	Final
AP	NR	NR	NR	NR	NR	NR	NR	NR	NR	NR	NR	NR	NR	NR	NR	NR	NR	NR	NR	NR	NR	
Coaches	NR	NR	NR	NR	NR	NR	NR	NR	NR	NR	NR	NR	NR	NR	NR	NR	NR	NR	NR	NR	NR	

Legend
	Increase in ranking
	Decrease in ranking
	Not ranked previous week
(RV)	Received Votes
