= 2023–24 Vanderbilt Commodores women's basketball team =

Intercollegiate basketball season

2023–24 Vanderbilt Commodores women's basketball

NCAA tournament, First Round
- Conference: Southeastern Conference
- Record: 23–10 (9–7 SEC)
- Head coach: Shea Ralph (3rd season)
- Associate head coach: Tom Garrick
- Assistant coaches: Ashley Earley; Kevin DeMille
- Home arena: Memorial Gymnasium

2023–24 SEC women's basketball standings
	Conf.				Overall
Team	W		L	PCT	W		L	PCT
No. 1 South Carolina †	16	–	0	1.000	38	–	0	1.000
No. 6 LSU	13	–	3	.813	31	–	6	.838
Ole Miss	12	–	4	.750	24	–	9	.727
Alabama	10	–	6	.625	24	–	10	.706
Tennessee	10	–	6	.625	20	–	13	.606
Vanderbilt	9	–	7	.563	23	–	10	.697
Mississippi State	8	–	8	.500	23	–	12	.657
Auburn	8	–	8	.500	20	–	12	.625
Texas A&M	6	–	10	.375	19	–	13	.594
Arkansas	6	–	10	.375	18	–	15	.545
Florida	5	–	11	.313	16	–	16	.500
Kentucky	4	–	12	.250	12	–	20	.375
Georgia	3	–	13	.188	12	–	18	.400
Missouri	2	–	14	.125	11	–	19	.367
† 2024 SEC tournament winner Rankings from AP poll

The 2023–24 Vanderbilt Commodores women's basketball team represented Vanderbilt University during the 2023–24 NCAA Division I women's basketball season. The Commodores were led by third-year head coach Shea Ralph and played their home games at Memorial Gymnasium as members of the Southeastern Conference (SEC).

== Previous season ==
The Commodores finished the 2022–23 season 12–19, 3–13 in SEC play to finish in 12th place. They were defeated by Texas A&M in the first round of the SEC tournament.

== Roster ==
2023–24 Vanderbilt Commodores women's basketball team
Players
Coaches

Pos.	#	Name	Height	Year	Previous school	Hometown
G	2	Jada Brown	5 ft 8 in (1.73 m)	So	Bentonville High School	Bentonville, Arkansas
G	3	Jordyn Cambridge	5 ft 9 in (1.75 m)	GS	The Ensworth School	Nashville, Tennessee
G	4	Madison Greene	5 ft 6 in (1.68 m)	Fr	Pickerington High School Central	Columbus, Ohio
G	5	Ryanne Allen	6 ft 1 in (1.85 m)	So	Archbishop Wood High School	Warminster, Pennsylvania
F	10	Bailey Gilmore (redshirt)	6 ft 3 in (1.91 m)	Fr	Bradwell Institute	Midway, Georgia
G	11	Jordyn Oliver	5 ft 10 in (1.78 m)	GS	Duke	Prosper, Texas
F	12	Khamil Pierre	6 ft 2 in (1.88 m)	Fr	Perry High School	Queen Creek, Arizona
G/F	13	Justine Pissott	6 ft 4 in (1.93 m)	So	Tennessee	Toms River, New Jersey
F	14	Aiyana Mitchell	6 ft 4 in (1.93 m)	Fr	Fountain-Fort Carson High School	Fountain, Colorado
G	21	Bella LaChance	5 ft 6 in (1.68 m)	Sr	St. Thomas Aquinas High School	Davie, Florida
G	23	Iyana Moore	5 ft 8 in (1.73 m)	Jr	Blackman High School	Murfreesboro, Tennessee
G	24	Aga Makurat	6 ft 2 in (1.88 m)	Fr	Sopocka Akademia Tenisowa	Sierakowice, Poland
F	35	Sacha Washington	6 ft 2 in (1.88 m)	Jr	Collins Hill High School	Lawrenceville, Georgia

Head coach

- Shea Ralph (Connecticut)

Assistant coach(es)

- Tom Garrick (Rhode Island)
- Ashley Earley (Vanderbilt)
- Kevin DeMille (Connecticut)

Legend

- (C) Team captain
- (S) Suspended
- (I) Ineligible
- (W) Walk-on
- Injured
- Current redshirt

Roster
Last update: March 20, 2024

== Schedule and results ==
Date time, TV	Rank^{#}	Opponent^{#}	Result	Record	Site (attendance) city, state
Non-conference regular season
November 6, 2023*; 11:00 a.m., SECN+		Kennesaw State	W 98–51	1–0	Memorial Gymnasium (2,943); Nashville, TN
November 9, 2023*; 5:30 p.m., ESPN3		at UT Martin	W 70–68	2–0	Skyhawk Arena (1,987); Martin, TN
November 12, 2023*; 1:00 p.m., SECN		Fairfield	W 73–70	3–0	Memorial Gymnasium (1,886); Nashville, TN
November 15, 2023*; 6:30 p.m., SECN+		Western Kentucky	W 77–74	4–0	Memorial Gymnasium (1,642); Nashville, TN
November 20, 2023*; 1:00 p.m., SECN+		Alabama State	W 88–42	5–0	Memorial Gymnasium (1,612); Nashville, TN
November 24, 2023*; 3:30 p.m., FloSports		vs. Iowa State; South Point Shootout	W 68–53	6–0	South Point Arena; Las Vegas, NV
November 25, 2023*; 3:30 p.m., FloSports		vs. Northern Iowa; South Point Shootout	W 68–64	7–0	South Point Arena (245); Las Vegas, NV
November 29, 2023*; 6:15 p.m., ACCN		at No. 5 NC State; ACC–SEC Challenge	L 62–70	7–1	Reynolds Coliseum (5,500); Raleigh, NC
December 3, 2023*; 1:00 p.m., SECN+		Louisiana Tech	W 71–63	8–1	Memorial Gymnasium (1,829); Nashville, TN
December 7, 2023*; 6:00 p.m., FloSports		at Butler	W 51–39	9–1	Hinkle Fieldhouse (873); Indianapolis, IN
December 17, 2023*; 1:00 p.m., ESPN+		Lipscomb	W 72–50	10–1	Memorial Gymnasium (2,258); Nashville, TN
December 20, 2023*; 1:00 p.m., SECN+		Dayton	W 70–53	11–1	Memorial Gymnasium (1,855); Nashville, TN
December 29, 2023*; 6:30 p.m., SECN+		Fairleigh Dickinson	W 73–41	12–1	Memorial Gymnasium (1,960); Nashville, TN
December 31, 2023*; 1:00 p.m., SECN+		Radford	W 80–53	13–1	Memorial Gymnasium (1,843); Nashville, TN
SEC regular season
January 4, 2024; 6:30 p.m., SECN+		at Mississippi State	W 71–66	14–1 (1–0)	Humphrey Coliseum (4,261); Starkville, MS
January 7, 2024; 1:00 p.m., SECN+		Florida	W 63–57	15–1 (2–0)	Memorial Gymnasium (4,737); Nashville, TN
January 11, 2024; 6:00 p.m., SECN+		at Kentucky	W 95–73	16–1 (3–0)	Rupp Arena (3,339); Lexington, KY
January 14, 2024; 12:00 p.m., SECN		Missouri	L 63–65	16–2 (3–1)	Memorial Gymnasium (2,650); Nashville, TN
January 18, 2024; 6:30 p.m., SECN+		Auburn	W 53–50	17–2 (4–1)	Memorial Gymnasium (1,848); Nashville, TN
January 21, 2024; 2:00 p.m., SECN		at Tennessee rivalry	L 64–73	17–3 (4–2)	Thompson–Boling Arena (9,088); Knoxville, TN
January 28, 2024; 2:00 p.m., SECN		at No. 1 South Carolina	L 74–91	17–4 (4–3)	Colonial Life Arena (18,000); Columbia, SC
February 1, 2024; 6:30 p.m., SECN+		Ole Miss	L 61–67	17–5 (4–4)	Memorial Gymnasium (2,106); Nashville, TN
February 5, 2024; 6:00 p.m., SECN		Alabama	L 66–74	17–6 (4–5)	Memorial Gymnasium (2,057); Nashville, TN
February 8, 2024; 8:00 p.m., SECN		No. 13 LSU	L 62–85	17–7 (4–6)	Memorial Gymnasium (6,354); Nashville, TN
February 11, 2024; 11:00 a.m., SECN		at Georgia	W 61–55	18–7 (5–6)	Stegeman Coliseum (3,187); Athens, GA
February 15, 2024; 8:00 p.m., SECN		at Texas A&M	W 49–45	19–7 (6–6)	Reed Arena (3,067); College Station, TX
February 18, 2024; 1:00 p.m., SECN		Tennessee rivalry	L 61–86	19–8 (6–7)	Memorial Gymnasium (6,259); Nashville, TN
February 25, 2024; 2:00 p.m., SECN+		at Arkansas	W 62–53	20–8 (7–7)	Bud Walton Arena (3,839); Fayetteville, AR
February 29, 2024; 7:00 p.m., SECN+		at Missouri	W 68–61	21–8 (8–7)	Mizzou Arena (4,071); Columbia, MO
March 3, 2024; 1:00 p.m., SECN+		Georgia	W 72–55	22–8 (9–7)	Memorial Gymnasium (3,739); Nashville, TN
SEC Tournament
March 7, 2024; 8:30 p.m., SECN	(6)	vs. (11) Florida; Second Round	L 59–62	22–9	Bon Secours Wellness Arena (7,187); Greenville, SC
NCAA Tournament
March 20, 2024; 8:00 p.m., ESPNU	(12 P3)	vs. (12 P3) Columbia; First Four	W 72–68	23–9	Cassell Coliseum (599); Blacksburg, VA
March 22, 2024*; 5:00 p.m., ESPNU	(12 P3)	vs. (5 P3) No. 19 Baylor; First Round	L 63–80	23–10	Cassell Coliseum (8,925); Blacksburg, VA
*Non-conference game. ^{#}Rankings from AP Poll. (#) Tournament seedings in parentheses. P3=Portland 3. All times are in Central Time.

== See also ==
- 2023–24 Vanderbilt Commodores men's basketball team
