= 2023–24 Texas A&M Aggies women's basketball team =

Intercollegiate basketball season

2023–24 Texas A&M Aggies women's basketball

NCAA tournament, First Round
- Conference: Southeastern Conference
- Record: 19–13 (6–10 SEC)
- Head coach: Joni Taylor (2nd season)
- Associate head coach: Chelsea Newton
- Assistant coaches: Robert Mosley; Rodney Hill
- Home arena: Reed Arena

2023–24 SEC women's basketball standings
	Conf.				Overall
Team	W		L	PCT	W		L	PCT
No. 1 South Carolina †	16	–	0	1.000	38	–	0	1.000
No. 6 LSU	13	–	3	.813	31	–	6	.838
Ole Miss	12	–	4	.750	24	–	9	.727
Alabama	10	–	6	.625	24	–	10	.706
Tennessee	10	–	6	.625	20	–	13	.606
Vanderbilt	9	–	7	.563	23	–	10	.697
Mississippi State	8	–	8	.500	23	–	12	.657
Auburn	8	–	8	.500	20	–	12	.625
Texas A&M	6	–	10	.375	19	–	13	.594
Arkansas	6	–	10	.375	18	–	15	.545
Florida	5	–	11	.313	16	–	16	.500
Kentucky	4	–	12	.250	12	–	20	.375
Georgia	3	–	13	.188	12	–	18	.400
Missouri	2	–	14	.125	11	–	19	.367
† 2024 SEC tournament winner Rankings from AP poll

The 2023–24 Texas A&M Aggies women's basketball team represented Texas A&M University during the 2023–24 NCAA Division I women's basketball season. The Aggies, led by second-year head coach Joni Taylor, played their home games at Reed Arena as members of the Southeastern Conference (SEC).

== Previous season ==
The Aggies finished the 2022–23 season 9–20, 2–14 in SEC play to finish in a tie for 13th (last) place. They defeated Vanderbilt in the first of the SEC tournament, and upset Mississippi State in the second round, before falling to Ole Miss in the quarterfinals.

== Roster ==
2023–24 Texas A&M Aggies women's basketball team
Players
Coaches

Pos.	#	Name	Height	Year	Previous school	Hometown
G	00	Sydney Bowles	6 ft 0 in (1.83 m)	So	Woodward Academy	Lithonia, Georgia
G	1	Endyia Rogers	5 ft 7 in (1.7 m)	GS	Oregon	Dallas, Texas
F	2	Janiah Barker	6 ft 4 in (1.93 m)	So	Montverde Academy	Marietta, Georgia
G	3	Tineya Hylton	5 ft 7 in (1.7 m)	Jr	Georgia	Toronto, Ontario
G	4	Kay Kay Green	5 ft 6 in (1.68 m)	Sr	Whitney Young High School	Chicago, Illinois
G	5	Aicha Coulibaly	6 ft 0 in (1.83 m)	Sr	Auburn	Bamako, Mali
G	10	Erica Moon	5 ft 6 in (1.68 m)	Fr	St. Francis School	Atlanta, Georgia
F	11	Vanessa Saidu	6 ft 2 in (1.88 m)	Fr	Robbinsdale Cooper High School	Minneapolis, Minnesota
F	13	Jada Malone	6 ft 3 in (1.91 m)	Jr	The Village School	Spring, Texas
F	14	Maliyah Johnson	6 ft 3 in (1.91 m)	RS Jr	Summer Creek High School	Chicago, Illinois
G	15	Solè Williams	5 ft 9 in (1.75 m)	Fr	Princeton High School	Cincinnati, Ohio
G	22	Kylie Marshall	5 ft 11 in (1.8 m)	Fr	Lake Ridge High School	Mansfield, Texas
G	23	Kyndall Hunter	5 ft 7 in (1.7 m)	RS So	Texas	Houston, Texas
G	24	Sahara Jones	6 ft 0 in (1.83 m)	Sr	Memorial High School	San Antonio, Texas
F	32	Lauren Ware	6 ft 5 in (1.96 m)	RS Jr	Arizona	Bismarck, North Dakota

Head coach

- Joni Taylor (Alabama)

Assistant coach(es)

- Chelsea Newton (Rutgers)
- Robert Mosley (Miles)
- Rodney Hill (Texas A&M)

Legend

- (C) Team captain
- (S) Suspended
- (I) Ineligible
- (W) Walk-on
- Injured
- Current redshirt

Roster
Last update: March 20, 2024

== Schedule and results ==
Date time, TV	Rank^{#}	Opponent^{#}	Result	Record	High points	High rebounds	High assists	Site (attendance) city, state
Non-conference regular season
November 9, 2023*; 6:00 p.m., SECN+		Texas A&M–Corpus Christi	W 73–50	1–0	17 – Coulibaly	12 – Ware	6 – Rogers	Reed Arena (3,057); College Station, TX
November 12, 2023*; 2:00 p.m., SECN+		North Texas	W 74–55	2–0	18 – Barker	12 – Ware	4 – Rogers	Reed Arena (3,094); College Station, TX
November 16, 2023*; 6:00 p.m., BTN+		at Purdue	L 58–72	2–1	19 – Barker	13 – Ware	5 – Rogers	Mackey Arena (5,223); West Lafayette, IN
November 20, 2023*; 7:00 p.m., SECN+		Houston Christian	W 80–35	3–1	15 – Barker	11 – Coulibaly	5 – Green	Reed Arena (3,073); College Station, TX
November 24, 2023*; 4:30 p.m.		vs. Winthrop; Raising the B.A.R. Invitational	W 84–32	4–1	16 – Rogers	11 – Ware	6 – Rogers	Haas Pavilion (1,074); Berkeley, CA
November 25, 2023*; 4:30 p.m.		vs. California; Raising the B.A.R. Invitational	W 65–51	5–1	11 – Ware	8 – Coulibaly	5 – Rogers	Haas Pavilion (843); Berkeley, CA
November 30, 2023*; 8:00 p.m., ACCN		at Wake Forest; ACC–SEC Challenge	W 81–57	6–1	14 – Barker	12 – Ware	4 – Green	LJVM Coliseum (763); Winston-Salem, NC
December 3, 2023*; 1:00 p.m., SECN		Kansas	W 63–52	7–1	18 – Barker	13 – Barker	3 – Rogers	Reed Arena (3,950); College Station, TX
December 6, 2023*; 11:00 a.m., SECN+		Lamar	W 83–51	8–1	13 – Tied	10 – Ware	4 – Rogers	Reed Arena (7,529); College Station, TX
December 9, 2023*; 12:00 p.m., SECN+		Robert Morris	W 67–36	9–1	16 – Coulibaly	10 – Ware	5 – Rogers	Reed Arena (3,558); College Station, TX
December 18, 2023*; 7:00 p.m., SECN+		Mississippi Valley State	W 95–45	10–1	20 – Barker	11 – Barker	9 – Rogers	Reed Arena (3,439); College Station, TX
December 20, 2023*; 1:00 p.m., SECN+		Prairie View A&M	W 88–36	11–1	15 – Coulibaly	8 – Ware	5 – Jones	Reed Arena (1,203); College Station, TX
December 31, 2023*; 2:00 p.m., SECN+		Texas A&M–Commerce	W 87–63	12–1	19 – Tied	16 – Ware	4 – Rogers	Reed Arena (4,039); College Station, TX
SEC regular season
January 4, 2024; 6:00 p.m., SECN+		at Georgia	L 50–54	12–2 (0–1)	18 – Rogers	7 – Tied	4 – Ware	Stegeman Coliseum (3,425); Athens, GA
January 7, 2024; 3:00 p.m., SECN		Auburn	W 66–44	13–2 (1–1)	14 – Coulibaly	10 – Barker	4 – Green	Reed Arena (5,953); College Station, TX
January 11, 2024; 7:00 p.m., SECN+		at No. 7 LSU	L 70–87	13–3 (1–2)	27 – Rogers	9 – Tied	5 – Rogers	Pete Maravich Assembly Center (11,536); Baton Rouge, LA
January 14, 2024; 4:00 p.m., ESPN		Tennessee	W 71–56	14–3 (2–2)	19 – Coulibaly	12 – Ware	4 – Tied	Reed Arena (4,785); College Station, TX
January 21, 2024; 4:00 p.m., SECN		No. 1 South Carolina	L 64–99	14–4 (2–3)	21 – Rogers	6 – Ware	2 – Tied	Reed Arena (5,924); College Station, TX
January 25, 2024; 8:00 p.m., SECN		at Missouri	W 69–67	15–4 (3–3)	22 – Ware	9 – Ware	6 – Tied	Mizzou Arena (3,864); Columbia, MO
January 28, 2024; 12:00 p.m., SECN		at Florida	L 51–63	15–5 (3–4)	16 – Coulibaly	11 – Coulibaly	5 – Rogers	O'Connell Center (1,460); Gainesville, FL
February 4, 2024; 3:00 p.m., SECN		Mississippi State	L 63–74	15–6 (3–5)	17 – Rogers	9 – Coulibaly	4 – Tied	Reed Arena (4,072); College Station, TX
February 8, 2024; 6:30 pm, SECN+		at Ole Miss	W 72–53	16–6 (4–5)	21 – Barker	11 – Ware	5 – Rogers	SJB Pavilion (2,599); Oxford, MS
February 11, 2024; 3:00 p.m., SECN		at Kentucky	W 61–44	17–6 (5–5)	15 – Tied	9 – Barker	4 – Tied	Rupp Arena (3,632); Lexington, KY
February 15, 2024; 8:00 p.m., SECN		Vanderbilt	L 45–49	17–7 (5–6)	20 – Coulibaly	9 – Jones	7 – Hylton	Reed Arena (3,067); College Station, TX
February 19, 2024; 6:00 p.m., SECN		No. 13 LSU	L 58–81	17–8 (5–7)	21 – Barker	9 – Tied	4 – Hylton	Reed Arena (6,908); College Station, TX
February 22, 2024; 7:00 p.m., SECN+		Arkansas	W 73–67	18–8 (6–7)	16 – Barker	15 – Barker	5 – Green	Reed Arena (3,712); College Station, TX
February 25, 2024; 2:00 p.m., SECN+		at Auburn	L 41–57	18–9 (6–8)	9 – Hylton	6 – Ware	5 – Green	Neville Arena (3,760); Auburn, AL
February 29, 2024; 6:00 p.m., SECN		at Tennessee	L 66–75	18–10 (6–9)	20 – Williams	5 – Coulibaly	3 – Jones	Thompson–Boling Arena (8,161); Knoxville, TN
March 3, 2024; 2:00 p.m., SECN+		Alabama	L 71–78	18–11 (6–10)	19 – Coulibaly	8 – Barker	5 – Coulibaly	Reed Arena (3,526); College Station, TX
SEC Tournament
March 7, 2024; 11:00 a.m., SECN	(9)	vs. (8) Mississippi State; Second Round	W 72–56	19–11	17 – Coulibaly	9 – Tied	5 – Tied	Bon Secours Wellness Arena (6,144); Greenville, SC
March 8, 2024; 11:00 a.m., SECN	(9)	vs. (1) No. 1 South Carolina; Quarterfinals	L 68–79	19–12	32 – Coulibaly	7 – Ware	4 – Rogers	Bon Secours Wellness Arena (8,841); Greenville, SC
NCAA Tournament
March 22, 2024*; 9:30 p.m., ESPNU	(11 A1)	vs. (6 A1) Nebraska; First round	L 59–61	19–13	26 – Coulibaly	10 – Coulibaly	4 – Green	Gill Coliseum; Corvallis, OR
*Non-conference game. ^{#}Rankings from AP Poll. (#) Tournament seedings in parentheses. A2=Albany 2. All times are in Central Time.

== Rankings ==
Ranking movements Legend: RV = Received votes
	Week																			
Poll	Pre	1	2	3	4	5	6	7	8	9	10	11	12	13	14	15	16	17	18	Final
AP	RV																			Not released
Coaches	RV																			

== See also ==
- 2023–24 Texas A&M Aggies men's basketball team
