= 2023–24 Missouri Tigers women's basketball team =

Intercollegiate basketball season

2023–24 Missouri Tigers women's basketball
- Conference: Southeastern Conference
- Record: 11–19 (2–14 SEC)
- Head coach: Robin Pingeton (14th season)
- Assistant coaches: Chris Bracey; Jasmine James; Preston Beverly
- Home arena: Mizzou Arena

2023–24 SEC women's basketball standings
	Conf.				Overall
Team	W		L	PCT	W		L	PCT
No. 1 South Carolina †	16	–	0	1.000	38	–	0	1.000
No. 6 LSU	13	–	3	.813	31	–	6	.838
Ole Miss	12	–	4	.750	24	–	9	.727
Alabama	10	–	6	.625	24	–	10	.706
Tennessee	10	–	6	.625	20	–	13	.606
Vanderbilt	9	–	7	.563	23	–	10	.697
Mississippi State	8	–	8	.500	23	–	12	.657
Auburn	8	–	8	.500	20	–	12	.625
Texas A&M	6	–	10	.375	19	–	13	.594
Arkansas	6	–	10	.375	18	–	15	.545
Florida	5	–	11	.313	16	–	16	.500
Kentucky	4	–	12	.250	12	–	20	.375
Georgia	3	–	13	.188	12	–	18	.400
Missouri	2	–	14	.125	11	–	19	.367
† 2024 SEC tournament winner Rankings from AP poll

The 2023–24 Missouri Tigers women's basketball team represented the University of Missouri during the 2023–24 NCAA Division I women's basketball season. The Tigers, who were led by fourteenth-year head coach Robin Pingeton, played their home games at Mizzou Arena as members of the Southeastern Conference (SEC).

== Previous season ==
The Tigers finished the 2022–23 season 18–14, 6–10 in SEC play to finish in ninth place. They were defeated by Arkansas in the second round of the SEC tournament. They received an at-large bid into the WNIT, where they would defeated Illinois State in the first round, before falling to in state rival and eventual tournament champions Kansas in the second round.

== Roster ==
2023–24 Missouri Tigers women's basketball team
Players
Coaches

Pos.	#	Name	Height	Year	Previous school	Hometown
G	0	Grace Slaughter	6 ft 2 in (1.88 m)	Fr	Grain Valley High School	Grain Valley, Missouri
PG	1	De'Myla Brown	5 ft 7 in (1.7 m)	GS	Houston	North Little Rock, Arkansas
G	4	Mama Dembele	5 ft 6 in (1.68 m)	Sr	IES Joaquim Blume	Manlleu, Spain
PF	5	Hilke Feldrappe	6 ft 3 in (1.91 m)	Fr	ALBA Berlin	Berlin, Germany
C	7	Lucija Milkovic	6 ft 6 in (1.98 m)	Fr	Šibenik Medical School	Šibenik, Croatia
G/F	14	Abby Feit	6 ft 1 in (1.85 m)	GS	Evansville	Normal, Illinois
F	20	Sarah Linthacum	6 ft 3 in (1.91 m)	Jr	Jefferson City High School	Jefferson City, Missouri
G	21	Averi Kroenke	5 ft 11 in (1.8 m)	So	Rock Bridge High School	Columbia, Missouri
G	23	Abbey Schreacke	6 ft 0 in (1.83 m)	Fr	Quincy Notre Dame High School	Quincy, Illinois
G	24	Ashton Judd	6 ft 1 in (1.85 m)	So	West Plains High School	West Plains, Missouri
F	30	Angelique Ngalakulondi	6 ft 2 in (1.88 m)	GS	UMass	Manchester, New Hampshire
F	34	Hannah Linthacum	6 ft 4 in (1.93 m)	Fr	Jefferson City High School	Jefferson City, Missouri
F	40	Micah Linthacum	6 ft 4 in (1.93 m)	RS Sr	Jefferson City High School	Jefferson City, Missouri
F	43	Hayley Frank	6 ft 1 in (1.85 m)	GS	Strafford High School	Strafford, Missouri

Head coach

- Robin Pingeton (St. Ambrose)

Assistant coach(es)

- Chris Bracey (West Texas A&M)
- Jasmine James (Georgia)
- Preston Beverly (VMI)

Legend

- (C) Team captain
- (S) Suspended
- (I) Ineligible
- (W) Walk-on
- Injured
- Current redshirt

Roster
Last update: March 20, 2024

== Schedule and results ==
Date time, TV	Rank^{#}	Opponent^{#}	Result	Record	High points	High rebounds	High assists	Site (attendance) city, state
Non-conference regular season
November 6, 2023*; 11:30 a.m., SECN+		Belmont	W 72–61	1–0	15 – Tied	10 – Tied	5 – Dembele	Mizzou Arena (5,336); Columbia, MO
November 9, 2023*; 7:00 p.m., SECN+		Indiana State	W 98–57	2–0	31 – Judd	5 – Ngalakulondi	7 – Dembele	Mizzou Arena (3,800); Columbia, MO
November 12, 2023*; 3:00 p.m., ESPN+		at Saint Louis	L 85–93	2–1	21 – Judd	8 – Dembele	14 – Dembele	Chaifetz Arena (2,276); St. Louis, MO
November 14, 2023*; 7:00 p.m., SECN+		North Alabama	W 83–72	3–1	29 – Frank	12 – Judd	4 – Dembele	Mizzou Arena (3,667); Columbia, MO
November 20, 2023*; 7:00 p.m., SECN+		Southern Indiana	W 96–62	4–1	26 – Frank	11 – Frank	9 – Dembele	Mizzou Arena (3,471); Columbia, MO
November 24, 2023*; 7:00 p.m., FloSports		vs. Tennessee Tech; Daytona Beach Classic	W 66–65	5–1	18 – Slaughter	6 – Tied	5 – Dembele	Ocean Center (250); Daytona Beach, FL
November 25, 2023*; 4:45 p.m., FloSports		vs. Kent State; Daytona Beach Classic	L 64–67	5–2	30 – Frank	8 – Frank	4 – Dembele	Ocean Center (250); Daytona Beach, FL
November 30, 2023*; 4:00 p.m., ACCN		at Virginia; ACC–SEC Challenge	L 81–87 ^{OT}	5–3	21 – Frank	7 – Frank	7 – Dembele	John Paul Jones Arena (3,701); Charlottesville, VA
December 2, 2023*; 2:00 p.m., SECN+		Southeast Missouri State	W 88–43	6–3	18 – Frank	9 – Frank	4 – Tied	Mizzou Arena (4,254); Columbia, MO
December 6, 2023*; 6:00 p.m., SECN+		Missouri State	W 81–63	7–3	20 – Judd	10 – Judd	12 – Dembele	Mizzou Arena (3,894); Columbia, MO
December 9, 2023*; 5:00 p.m.		vs. No. 13 Kansas State; Bill Snyder Classic	L 56–84	7–4	13 – Tied	9 – Frank	6 – Dembele	St. Joseph Civic Arena (3,500); St. Joseph, MO
December 17, 2023*; 3:00 p.m., BTN		at Illinois; Braggin' Rights	W 69–66	8–4	20 – Dembele	9 – Frank	4 – Dembele	State Farm Center (4,790); Champaign, IL
December 21, 2023*; 7:00 p.m., SECN+		Kansas City	W 85–42	9–4	20 – H. Linthacum	13 – Judd	5 – Dembele	Mizzou Arena (4,152); Columbia, MO
SEC regular season
January 4, 2024; 8:00 p.m., SECN		at No. 7 LSU	L 72–92	9–5 (0–1)	22 – Frank	7 – Feit	9 – Dembele	Pete Maravich Assembly Center (11,286); Baton Rouge, LA
January 7, 2024; 5:00 p.m., SECN		Alabama	L 64–79	9–6 (0–2)	15 – Frank	7 – Tied	10 – Dembele	Mizzou Arena (4,851); Columbia, MO
January 11, 2024; 7:00 p.m., SECN+		No. 1 South Carolina	L 57–81	9–7 (0–3)	16 – Tied	7 – Judd	4 – Tied	Mizzou Arena (4,533); Columbia, MO
January 14, 2024; 12:00 p.m., SECN		at Vanderbilt	W 65–63	10–7 (1–3)	19 – Judd	8 – Frank	9 – Dembele	Memorial Gymnasium (2,650); Nashville, TN
January 18, 2024; 7:00 p.m., SECN+		Georgia	W 69–57	11–7 (2–3)	24 – Frank	9 – Dembele	5 – Tied	Mizzou Arena (3,836); Columbia, MO
January 21, 2024; 1:00 p.m., SECN+		at Kentucky	L 71–76	11–8 (2–4)	24 – Frank	10 – Judd	10 – Dembele	Rupp Arena (3,665); Lexington, KY
January 25, 2024; 8:00 p.m., SECN		Texas A&M	L 67–69	11–9 (2–5)	26 – Frank	7 – Tied	7 – Dembele	Mizzou Arena (3,864); Columbia, MO
January 28, 2024; 2:00 p.m., SECN+		Arkansas	L 58–67	11–10 (2–6)	22 – Judd	6 – Judd	4 – Tied	Mizzou Arena (4,968); Columbia, MO
February 4, 2024; 1:00 p.m., SECN+		at Tennessee	L 69–80	11–11 (2–7)	18 – Dembele	8 – Dembele	3 – Dembele	Thompson–Boling Arena (9,190); Knoxville, TN
February 8, 2024; 6:00 p.m., SECN		at No. 1 South Carolina	L 45–83	11–12 (2–8)	12 – Tied	10 – Judd	3 – Dembele	Colonial Life Arena (15,236); Columbia, SC
February 11, 2024; 1:00 p.m., SECN		Auburn	L 59–70	11–13 (2–9)	15 – Dembele	11 – Dembele	11 – Demebele	Mizzou Arena (4,480); Columbia, MO
February 18, 2024; 3:00 p.m., SECN		at Arkansas	L 68–75	11–14 (2–10)	22 – Frank	7 – Dembele	5 – Dembele	Bud Walton Arena (5,927); Fayetteville, AR
February 22, 2024; 5:00 p.m., SECN+		at Florida	L 70–86	11–15 (2–11)	16 – Schreacke	6 – Frank	4 – Judd	O'Connell Center (727); Gainesville, FL
February 26, 2024; 6:00 p.m., SECN		Ole Miss	L 45–66	11–16 (2–12)	11 – Dembele	6 – Judd	3 – Dembele	Mizzou Arena (4,140); Columbia, MO
February 29, 2024; 7:00 p.m., SECN+		Vanderbilt	L 61–68	11–17 (2–13)	15 – Judd	6 – Tied	7 – Dembele	Mizzou Arena (4,071); Columbia, MO
March 3, 2024; 2:00 p.m., SECN+		at Mississippi State	L 75–90	11–18 (2–14)	18 – Frank	5 – Frank	7 – Dembele	Humphrey Coliseum (6,297); Starkville, MS
SEC Tournament
March 6, 2024; 12:30 p.m., SECN	(14)	vs. (11) Florida; First Round	L 60–66	11–19	17 – Judd	8 – Frank	7 – Dembele	Bon Secours Wellness Arena (8,409); Greenville, SC
*Non-conference game. ^{#}Rankings from AP Poll. (#) Tournament seedings in parentheses. All times are in Central Time.

== See also ==
- 2023–24 Missouri Tigers men's basketball team
