= 2023–24 South Carolina Gamecocks women's basketball team =

Intercollegiate basketball season

2023–24 South Carolina Gamecocks women's basketball

Aflac Oui-Play champions Jimmy V Women's Classic champions Hall of Fame Showcase champions SEC regular season champions SEC tournament champions NCAA tournament champions
- Conference: Southeastern Conference

Ranking
- Coaches: No. 1
- AP: No. 1
- Record: 38–0 (16–0 SEC)
- Head coach: Dawn Staley (16th season)
- Assistant coaches: Lisa Boyer; Winston Gandy; Jolette Law; Khadijah Sessions; Mary Wooley
- Home arena: Colonial Life Arena

2023–24 SEC women's basketball standings
	Conf.				Overall
Team	W		L	PCT	W		L	PCT
No. 1 South Carolina †	16	–	0	1.000	38	–	0	1.000
No. 6 LSU	13	–	3	.813	31	–	6	.838
Ole Miss	12	–	4	.750	24	–	9	.727
Alabama	10	–	6	.625	24	–	10	.706
Tennessee	10	–	6	.625	20	–	13	.606
Vanderbilt	9	–	7	.563	23	–	10	.697
Mississippi State	8	–	8	.500	23	–	12	.657
Auburn	8	–	8	.500	20	–	12	.625
Texas A&M	6	–	10	.375	19	–	13	.594
Arkansas	6	–	10	.375	18	–	15	.545
Florida	5	–	11	.313	16	–	16	.500
Kentucky	4	–	12	.250	12	–	20	.375
Georgia	3	–	13	.188	12	–	18	.400
Missouri	2	–	14	.125	11	–	19	.367
† 2024 SEC tournament winner Rankings from AP poll

The 2023–24 South Carolina Gamecocks women's basketball team represented the University of South Carolina during the 2023–24 NCAA Division I women's basketball season. The Gamecocks, led by sixteenth-year head coach Dawn Staley, played their home games at Colonial Life Arena and competed as members of the Southeastern Conference (SEC), winning both the regular season and conference tournament championship. Staley won her 600th game as head coach on February 22, 2024, in 786 games (534 at South Carolina). The season saw the Gamecocks not only capture their third national title in the history of the school's women's basketball program, but also become the 10th Division I women's basketball team to finish the season undefeated. The 2023-24 Gamecocks are considered to be one of the greatest teams in the history of the sport.

== Previous season ==
The Gamecocks finished the season 29–0 (16–0 SEC). They won the SEC regular season and tournament championships and received an automatic bid to the NCAA tournament, where they defeated Norfolk State, South Florida, UCLA, and Maryland before falling to Iowa in the Final Four.

== Offseason ==
=== Departures ===
South Carolina Departures
Name	Number	Pos.	Height	Year	Hometown	Notes	Ref
Olivia Thompson	0	G	5'8"	Senior	Lexington, SC	Graduated	
Zia Cooke	1	G	5'9"	Senior	Toledo, OH	Drafted tenth overall by the Los Angeles Sparks	
Aliyah Boston	4	F	6'5"	Senior	St. Thomas, USVI	Drafted first overall by the Indiana Fever	
Victaria Saxton	5	F	6'2"	Senior	Rome, GA	Drafted twenty-fifth overall by the Indiana Fever	
Talaysia Cooper	11	G	6'0"	Freshman	Turbeville, SC	Transferred to Tennessee	
Brea Beal	12	G	6'1"	Senior	Rock Island, IL	Drafted twenty-fourth overall by the Minnesota Lynx	
Laeticia Amihere	15	F	6'4"	Senior	Mississauga, ON	Drafted eighth overall by the Atlanta Dream	
Kierra Fletcher	41	G	5'9"	Graduate Student	Warren, MI	Graduated	

=== 2023 recruiting class ===
College recruiting information
Name	Hometown	School	Height	Weight	Commit date
MiLaysia Fulwiley; G	Columbia, SC	W.J. Keenan HS	5 ft 10 in (1.78 m)	N/A	
MiLaysia Fulwiley; G	Recruit ratings: ESPN: (96)				
Tessa Johnson; G	Albertville, MN	St. Michael-Albertville HS	6 ft 0 in (1.83 m)	N/A	
Tessa Johnson; G	Recruit ratings: ESPN: (95)				
Sahnya Jah; F	Alexandria, VA	Montverde Academy	6 ft 0 in (1.83 m)	N/A	
Sahnya Jah; F	Recruit ratings: ESPN: (94)				
Overall recruit ranking:
Note: In many cases, Scout, Rivals, 247Sports, On3, and ESPN may conflict in their listings of height and weight.; In these cases, the average was taken. ESPN grades are on a 100-point scale.; Sources:

=== Incoming transfers ===
South Carolina incoming transfers
Name	Number	Pos.	Height	Year	Hometown	Previous school
Te-Hina Paopao	0	G	5'9"	Senior	Oceanside, CA	Oregon
Sakima Walker	25	C	6'5"	Senior	Columbus, OH	Northwest Florida State College

== Roster ==
2023–24 South Carolina Gamecocks women's basketball team
Players
Coaches

Pos.	#	Name	Height	Year	Previous school	Hometown
G	0	Te-Hina Paopao	5 ft 9 in (1.75 m)	Sr	La Jolla Country Day School; Oregon	Oceanside, CA (United States) (California)
F	2	Ashlyn Watkins	6 ft 3 in (1.91 m)	So	Cardinal Newman HS	Columbia, SC (United States) (South Carolina)
G	5	Tessa Johnson	6 ft 0 in (1.83 m)	Fr	St. Michael-Albertville HS	Albertville, MN (United States) (Minnesota)
C	10	Kamilla Cardoso	6 ft 7 in (2.01 m)	Sr	Hamilton Heights Christian Academy; Syracuse	Montes Claros, Brazil
G	12	MiLaysia Fulwiley	5 ft 10 in (1.78 m)	Fr	W.J. Keenan HS	Columbia, SC (United States) (South Carolina)
F	20	Sania Feagin	6 ft 3 in (1.91 m)	Jr	Forest Park HS	Ellenwood, GA (United States) (Georgia (U.S. state))
F	21	Chloe Kitts	6 ft 2 in (1.88 m)	So	DME Academy	Oviedo, FL (United States) (Florida)
G	23	Bree Hall	6 ft 0 in (1.83 m)	Jr	Wayne HS	Dayton, OH (United States) (Ohio)
F	24	Sahnya Jah	6 ft 0 in (1.83 m)	Fr	Montverde Academy	Alexandria, VA (United States) (Virginia)
G	25	Raven Johnson	5 ft 9 in (1.75 m)	So	Westlake HS	Atlanta, GA (United States) (Georgia (U.S. state))
C	35	Sakima Walker	6 ft 5 in (1.96 m)	Sr	Columbus Africentric Early College; Northwest Florida State College	Columbus, OH (United States) (Ohio)

Head coach

- Dawn Staley (Virginia)

Assistant coach(es)

- Lisa Boyer (Ithaca)
- Winston Gandy (Maryland)
- Jolette Law (Iowa)
- Khadijah Sessions (South Carolina)
- Mary Wooley (USC Aiken)

Legend

- (C) Team captain
- (S) Suspended
- (I) Ineligible
- (W) Walk-on
- Injured
- Current redshirt

Roster

=== SEC Media Poll ===
SEC media poll
Predicted finish	Team
1	LSU
2	South Carolina
3	Tennessee
4	Ole Miss
5	Mississippi State
6	Arkansas
7	Georgia
8	Texas A&M
9	Alabama
10	Florida
11	Missouri
12	Auburn
13	Kentucky
14	Vanderbilt

== Schedule and results ==
Date time, TV	Rank^{#}	Opponent^{#}	Result	Record	High points	High rebounds	High assists	Site (attendance) city, state
Exhibition
October 22, 2023*; 1:00 p.m.	No. 6	Rutgers; Nikki McCray-Penson memorial exhibition	W 100–55		17 – Cardoso	10 – Kitts	9 – R. Johnson	Colonial Life Arena; Columbia, SC
Regular season
November 6, 2023*; 1:00 p.m., ESPN	No. 6	vs. No. 10 Notre Dame; Aflac Oui-Play	W 100–71	1–0	20 – Cardoso	15 – Cardoso	7 – R. Johnson	Halle Georges Carpentier (3,203); Paris, France
November 12, 2023*; 1:00 p.m., ABC	No. 6	No. 14 Maryland	W 114–76	2–0	14 – PaoPao	11 – Watkins	8 – Tied	Colonial Life Arena (16,007); Columbia, SC
November 16, 2023*; 7:00 p.m., SECN	No. 1	Clemson; Rivalry	W 109–40	3–0	18 – Fulwiley	13 – Cardoso	17 – R. Johnson	Colonial Life Arena (16,820); Columbia, SC
November 20, 2023*; 7:00 p.m., SECN+	No. 1	South Dakota State	W 78–38	4–0	23 – Cardoso	10 – Cardoso	6 – R. Johnson	Colonial Life Arena (14,799); Columbia, SC
November 24, 2023*; 1:00 p.m., SECN+	No. 1	Mississippi Valley State	W 101–19	5–0	17 – Fulwiley	10 – Cardoso	5 – Tied	Colonial Life Arena (14,558); Columbia, SC
November 30, 2023*; 7:00 p.m., ESPN	No. 1	at No. 24 North Carolina; ACC–SEC Challenge	W 65–58	6–0	15 – Hall	16 – Cardoso	4 – PaoPao	Carmichael Arena (6,319); Chapel Hill, NC
December 3, 2023*; 1:00 p.m., ABC	No. 1	at Duke; Jimmy V Classic	W 77–61	7–0	15 – Cardoso	14 – Cardoso	4 – R. Johnson	Cameron Indoor Stadium (5,607); Durham, NC
December 6, 2023*; 7:00 p.m., SECN+	No. 1	Morgan State	W 104–38	8–0	16 – T. Johnson	14 – Kitts	6 – Fulwiley	Colonial Life Arena (16,181); Columbia, SC
December 10, 2023*; 2:30 p.m., ESPN	No. 1	vs. No. 11 Utah; Hall of Fame Showcase	W 78–69	9–0	17 – Cardoso	7 – Kitts	4 – Tied	Mohegan Sun Arena (8,428); Uncasville, CT
December 16, 2023*; 1:00 p.m., SECN+	No. 1	Presbyterian	W 99–29	10–0	18 – Fulwiley	12 – Watkins	6 – PaoPao	Colonial Life Arena (15,176); Columbia, SC
December 19, 2023*; 7:00 p.m., ESPN+	No. 1	at Bowling Green	W 93–62	11–0	21 – Kitts	8 – Watkins	6 – PaoPao	Stroh Center (4,195); Bowling Green, OH
December 30, 2023*; 12:00 p.m., ESPN2	No. 1	at East Carolina	W 73–36	12–0	12 – Tied	10 – Tied	5 – Cardoso	Williams Arena (5,717); Greenville, NC
January 4, 2024; 7:00 p.m., SECN	No. 1	at Florida	W 89–66	13–0 (1–0)	17 – Paopao	15 – Cardoso	5 – R. Johnson	O'Connell Center (4,192); Gainesville, FL
January 7, 2024; 1:00 p.m., ESPN	No. 1	Mississippi State	W 85–66	14–0 (2–0)	15 – Hall	14 – Cardoso	6 – Cardoso	Colonial Life Arena (15,751); Columbia, SC
January 11, 2024; 8:00 p.m., SECN+	No. 1	at Missouri	W 81–57	15–0 (3–0)	21 – Hall	8 – Cardoso	4 – Feagin	Mizzou Arena (4,533); Columbia, MO
January 15, 2024; 7:00 p.m., SECN	No. 1	Kentucky	W 98–36	16–0 (4–0)	14 – Tied	11 – Cardoso	6 – R. Johnson	Colonial Life Arena (15,929); Columbia, SC
January 21, 2024; 5:00 p.m., SECN	No. 1	at Texas A&M	W 99–64	17–0 (5–0)	21 – Fulwiley	13 – Cardoso	5 – Tied	Reed Arena (5,924); College Station, TX
January 25, 2024; 8:00 p.m., ESPN	No. 1	at No. 9 LSU; College GameDay	W 76–70	18–0 (6–0)	14 – Kitts	9 – R. Johnson	6 – PaoPao	Pete Maravich Assembly Center (13,205); Baton Rouge, LA
January 28, 2024; 3:00 p.m., SECN	No. 1	Vanderbilt	W 91–74	19–0 (7–0)	23 – Cardoso	8 – Watkins	7 – R. Johnson	Colonial Life Arena (18,000); Columbia, SC
February 1, 2024; 8:00 p.m., SECN+	No. 1	at Auburn	W 76–54	20–0 (8–0)	15 – Fulwiley	15 – Watkins	5 – R. Johnson	Neville Arena (4,814); Auburn, AL
February 4, 2024; 2:00 p.m., ESPN2	No. 1	Ole Miss	W 85–56	21–0 (9–0)	17 – Cardoso	10 – Watkins	6 – R. Johnson	Colonial Life Arena (18,000); Columbia, SC
February 8, 2024; 7:00 p.m., SECN	No. 1	Missouri	W 83–45	22–0 (10–0)	19 – Fulwiley	8 – Tied	5 – T. Johnson	Colonial Life Arena (15,236); Columbia, SC
February 11, 2024*; 2:00 p.m., ESPN	No. 1	No. 11 UConn	W 83–65	23–0	21 – PaoPao	12 – R. Johnson	5 – R. Johnson	Colonial Life Arena (18,167); Columbia, SC
February 15, 2024; 7:00 p.m., ESPN	No. 1	at Tennessee	W 66–55	24–0 (11–0)	18 – Cardoso	15 – R. Johnson	5 – R. Johnson	Thompson–Boling Arena (11,073); Knoxville, TN
February 18, 2024; 1:00 p.m., ABC	No. 1	Georgia; College GameDay	W 70–56	25–0 (12–0)	16 – Cardoso	16 – Cardoso	5 – Tied	Colonial Life Arena (18,478); Columbia, SC
February 22, 2024; 7:00 p.m., SECN	No. 1	Alabama	W 72–44	26–0 (13–0)	14 – Watkins	10 – Watkins	4 – Paopao	Colonial Life Arena (16,229); Columbia, SC
February 25, 2024; 3:00 p.m., SECN	No. 1	at Kentucky	W 103–55	27–0 (14–0)	17 – Fulwiley	12 – Kitts	5 – Tied	Rupp Arena (5,626); Lexington, KY
February 29, 2024; 9:00 p.m., SECN	No. 1	at Arkansas	W 98–61	28–0 (15–0)	21 – Watkins	11 – Watkins	7 – R. Johnson	Bud Walton Arena (3,891); Fayetteville, AR
March 3, 2024; 12:00 p.m., ESPN	No. 1	Tennessee	W 76–68	29–0 (16–0)	18 – Cardoso	14 – Cardoso	4 – Tied	Colonial Life Arena (18,000); Columbia, SC
SEC Tournament
March 8, 2024; 12:00 p.m., SECN	(1) No. 1	vs. (9) Texas A&M; Quarterfinals	W 79–68	30–0	17 – Cardoso	6 – Cardoso	5 – R. Johnson	Bon Secours Wellness Arena (8,841); Greenville, SC
March 9, 2024; 4:30 p.m., ESPNU	(1) No. 1	vs. (5) Tennessee; Semifinals	W 74–73	31–0	13 – Tied	7 – R. Johnson	4 – R. Johnson	Bon Secours Wellness Arena (12,784); Greenville, SC
March 10, 2024; 3:00 p.m., ESPN	(1) No. 1	vs. (2) No. 8 LSU; Championship	W 79–72	32–0	24 – Fulwiley	6 – Tied	5 – Tied	Bon Secours Wellness Arena (13,163); Greenville, SC
NCAA Tournament
March 22, 2024*; 2:00 p.m., ESPN	(1 A1) No. 1	(16 A1) Presbyterian; First round	W 91–39	33–0	21 – Kitts	13 – Kitts	4 – Tied	Colonial Life Arena (11,536); Columbia, SC
March 24, 2024*; 1:00 p.m., ABC	(1 A1) No. 1	(8 A1) North Carolina; Second round	W 88–41	34–0	20 – Fulwiley	10 – Cardoso	6 – PaoPao	Colonial Life Arena (14,266); Columbia, SC
March 29, 2024*; 5:00 p.m., ESPN	(1 A1) No. 1	vs. (4 A1) No. 14 Indiana; Sweet Sixteen	W 79–75	35–0	22 – Cardoso	7 – Cardoso	6 – Johnson	MVP Arena (13,597); Albany, NY
March 31, 2024*; 1:00 p.m., ABC	(1 A1) No. 1	vs. (3 A1) No. 12 Oregon State; Elite Eight	W 70–58	36–0	15 – T. Johnson	14 – Watkins	6 – R. Johnson	MVP Arena (13,568); Albany, NY
April 5, 2024*; 7:00 p.m., ESPN	(1 A1) No. 1	vs. (3 P4) No. 11 NC State; Final Four	W 78–59	37–0	22 – Cardoso	20 – Watkins	6 – PaoPao	Rocket Mortgage FieldHouse (18,284); Cleveland, OH
April 7, 2024*; 3:00 p.m., ABC	(1 A1) No. 1	vs. (1 A2) No. 2 Iowa; National Championship	W 87–75	38–0	19 – T. Johnson	17 – Cardoso	4 – Fulwiley	Rocket Mortgage FieldHouse (18,300); Cleveland, OH
*Non-conference game. ^{#}Rankings from AP Poll. (#) Tournament seedings in parentheses. A1=Albany 1. P4=Portland 4. All times are in Eastern Time.

== Rankings ==
NOTE: AP never releases final ranking.

Ranking movements Legend: ██ Increase in ranking ██ Decrease in ranking ( ) = First-place votes
	Week																				
Poll	Pre	1	2	3	4	5	6	7	8	9	10	11	12	13	14	15	16	17	18	19	Final
AP	6	1 (23)	1 (36)	1 (36)	1 (35)	1 (36)	1 (35)	1 (36)	1 (35)	1 (34)	1 (36)	1 (35)	1 (35)	1 (35)	1 (35)	1 (35)	1 (35)	1 (35)	1 (35)	1 (35)	1 (35)
Coaches	4	1 (23)	1 (32)	1 (32)	1 (32)	1 (32)	1 (32)	1 (32)	1 (32)	1 (32)	1 (32)	1 (32)	1 (32)	1 (32)	1 (32)	1 (32)	1 (32)	1 (32)	1 (32)	1 (30)	1

== See also ==
- 2023–24 South Carolina Gamecocks men's basketball team
