= 2023–24 Alabama Crimson Tide women's basketball team =

Intercollegiate basketball season

2023–24 Alabama Crimson Tide women's basketball

NCAA tournament, Second Round
- Conference: Southeastern Conference
- Record: 24–10 (10–6 SEC)
- Head coach: Kristy Curry (11th season)
- Assistant coaches: Tennille Adams; Kelly Curry; Roman Tubner
- Home arena: Coleman Coliseum

2023–24 SEC women's basketball standings
| | Conf. | | | | Overall |
| Team | W | | L | PCT | W | | L | PCT |
|---|---|---|---|---|---|---|---|---|
| No. 1 South Carolina † | 16 | – | 0 | 1.000 | 38 | – | 0 | 1.000 |
| No. 6 LSU | 13 | – | 3 | .813 | 31 | – | 6 | .838 |
| Ole Miss | 12 | – | 4 | .750 | 24 | – | 9 | .727 |
| Alabama | 10 | – | 6 | .625 | 24 | – | 10 | .706 |
| Tennessee | 10 | – | 6 | .625 | 20 | – | 13 | .606 |
| Vanderbilt | 9 | – | 7 | .563 | 23 | – | 10 | .697 |
| Mississippi State | 8 | – | 8 | .500 | 23 | – | 12 | .657 |
| Auburn | 8 | – | 8 | .500 | 20 | – | 12 | .625 |
| Texas A&M | 6 | – | 10 | .375 | 19 | – | 13 | .594 |
| Arkansas | 6 | – | 10 | .375 | 18 | – | 15 | .545 |
| Florida | 5 | – | 11 | .313 | 16 | – | 16 | .500 |
| Kentucky | 4 | – | 12 | .250 | 12 | – | 20 | .375 |
| Georgia | 3 | – | 13 | .188 | 12 | – | 18 | .400 |
| Missouri | 2 | – | 14 | .125 | 11 | – | 19 | .367 |
† 2024 SEC tournament winner Rankings from AP poll

The 2023–24 Alabama Crimson Tide women's basketball team represented the University of Alabama during the 2023–24 NCAA Division I women's basketball season. The Crimson Tide, were led by eleventh-year head coach Kristy Curry, played their home games at Coleman Coliseum and competed as members of the Southeastern Conference (SEC).

== Previous season ==
The Crimson Tide finished the season 20–11 (9–7 SEC) to finish in a tie for fifth in the SEC and received an at-large bid to the NCAA tournament, where they lost to Baylor in the first round.

== Offseason ==
=== Departures ===
Alabama Departures
| Name | Number | Pos. | Height | Year | Hometown | Notes | Ref |
|---|---|---|---|---|---|---|---|
| Megan Abrams | 1 | G | 5'9" | Graduate Student | Lafayette, LA | Graduated | |
| JaMya Mingo-Young | 4 | G | 5'8" | Senior | Bogalusa, LA | Transferred to Auburn | |
| Hannah Barber | 5 | G | 5'6" | Graduate Student | Homewood, AL | Graduated | |
| Ryan Cobbins | 10 | G/F | 6'0" | Senior | Kansas City, KS | Transferred to Kansas | |
| Myra Gordon | 15 | G/F | 6'0" | Junior | Fort Worth, TX | Transferred to Pepperdine | |
| Brittany Davis | 23 | G | 5'9" | Graduate Student | Manchester, GA | Graduated | |
| Jada Rice | 31 | C | 6'4" | Graduate Student | Suwanee, GA | Graduated | |
| Khyla Wade-Warren | 33 | F | 6'2" | Junior | Selmer, TN | Transferred to Chattanooga | |

=== 2023 recruiting class ===
College recruiting information
| Name | Hometown | School | Height | Weight | Commit date |
|---|---|---|---|---|---|
| Essence Cody; F | Valdosta, GA | Valdosta HS | 6 ft 4 in (1.93 m) | N/A | |
| Essence Cody; F | Recruit ratings: ESPN: (96) | | | | |
| Reychel Douglas; G | Raleigh, NC | Millbrook HS | 6 ft 0 in (1.83 m) | N/A | |
| Reychel Douglas; G | Recruit ratings: ESPN: (94) | | | | |
| Naomi Jones; F | Jackson, AL | Jackson HS | 6 ft 4 in (1.93 m) | N/A | |
| Naomi Jones; F | Recruit ratings: ESPN: (93) | | | | |
Overall recruit ranking:
Note: In many cases, Scout, Rivals, 247Sports, On3, and ESPN may conflict in their listings of height and weight.; In these cases, the average was taken. ESPN grades are on a 100-point scale.; Sources:

=== Incoming transfers ===
Alabama incoming transfers
| Name | Number | Pos. | Height | Year | Hometown | Previous school |
|---|---|---|---|---|---|---|
| Jessica Timmons | 23 | G | 5'8" | Junior | Charlotte, NC | NC State |
| Meg Newman | 42 | F | 6'3" | RS Sophomore | Indianapolis, IN | Arizona State |
| Del'Janae Williams | 51 | G | 5'8" | Graduate Student | Detroit, MI | Indiana State |

== Roster ==
2023–24 Alabama Crimson Tide women's basketball team
Players
Coaches

| Pos. | # | Name | Height | Year | Previous school | Hometown |
|---|---|---|---|---|---|---|
| G | 0 | Loyal McQueen | 5 ft 8 in (1.73 m) | Sr | Wilson HS; Georgia Tech | Florence, SC (United States) (South Carolina) |
| G | 3 | Sarah Ashlee Barker | 6 ft 0 in (1.83 m) | Sr | Spain Park HS; Georgia | Birmingham, AL (United States) (Alabama) |
| G | 5 | Reychel Douglas | 6 ft 0 in (1.83 m) | Fr | Millbrook HS | Raleigh, NC (United States) (North Carolina) |
| C | 13 | JeAnna Cunningham | 6 ft 5 in (1.96 m) | Sr | St. Francis Prep; West Virginia | Long Island, NY (United States) (New York (state)) |
| F | 21 | Essence Cody | 6 ft 4 in (1.93 m) | Fr | Valdosta HS | Valdosta, GA (United States) (Georgia (U.S. state)) |
| G | 22 | Karly Weathers | 5 ft 11 in (1.8 m) | So | Loretto HS | Loretto, TN (United States) (Tennessee) |
| G | 23 | Jessica Timmons | 5 ft 8 in (1.73 m) | Jr | North Mecklenburg HS; NC State | Charlotte, NC (United States) (North Carolina) |
| F | 31 | Naomi Jones | 6 ft 4 in (1.93 m) | Fr | Jackson HS | Jackson, AL (United States) (Alabama) |
| G/F | 32 | Aaliyah Nye | 6 ft 0 in (1.83 m) | Sr | East Lansing HS; Illinois | East Lansing, MI (United States) (Michigan) |
| F | 42 | Meg Newman | 6 ft 3 in (1.91 m) | RS So | North Central HS; Arizona State | Indianapolis, IN (United States) (Indiana) |
| G | 51 | Del'Janae Williams | 5 ft 8 in (1.73 m) | GS | Martin Luther King Jr. HS; Indiana State | Detroit, MI (United States) (Michigan) |

Head coach

- Kristy Curry (Louisiana–Monroe)

Assistant coach(es)

- Tennille Adams (Arkansas)
- Kelly Curry (Texas A&M)
- Roman Tubner (Centenary)

Legend

- (C) Team captain
- (S) Suspended
- (I) Ineligible
- (W) Walk-on
- Injured
- Current redshirt

Roster

== Schedule and results ==
| Date time, TV | Rank^{#} | Opponent^{#} | Result | Record | High points | High rebounds | High assists | Site (attendance) city, state |
Exhibition
| November 1, 2023*; 5:30 p.m. | | Alabama–Huntsville | W 82–32 | | 16 – Nye | 8 – Weathers | 4 – Williams | Coleman Coliseum; Tuscaloosa, AL |
Non-conference regular season
| November 6, 2023*; 4:30 p.m., SECN+ | | Alabama State | W 93–39 | 1–0 | 23 – Barker | 8 – Barker | 3 – McQueen | Coleman Coliseum (1,264); Tuscaloosa, AL |
| November 10, 2023*; 4:30 p.m., SECN+ | | Winthrop | W 79–50 | 2–0 | 19 – Barker | 8 – Cody | 3 – Nye | Coleman Coliseum (1,234); Tuscaloosa, AL |
| November 12, 2023*; 2:00 p.m., SECN+ | | Morehead State | W 85–45 | 3–0 | 14 – Nye | 7 – Cody | 4 – Timmons | Coleman Coliseum (2,033); Tuscaloosa, AL |
| November 16, 2023*; 6:00 p.m., SECN+ | | South Florida | W 70–41 | 4–0 | 25 – Barker | 9 – Barker | 4 – Barker | Coleman Coliseum (1,925); Tuscaloosa, AL |
| November 19, 2023*; 1:00 p.m., ESPN+ | | at Little Rock | W 63–39 | 5–0 | 15 – Barker | 9 – Timmons | 4 – Barker | Jack Stephens Center (151); Little Rock, AR |
| November 24, 2023*; 11:00 a.m., ESPN+ | | vs. No. 20 Louisville; Betty Chancellor Classic | W 78–73 | 6–0 | 18 – Barker | 7 – Tied | 4 – McQueen | Merrell Center; Katy, TX |
| November 25, 2023*; 1:30 p.m., ESPN+ | | vs. Gonzaga; Betty Chancellor Classic | L 58–68 | 6–1 | 14 – Williams | 11 – Cody | 2 – McQueen | Merrell Center (530); Katy, TX |
| November 26, 2023*; 11:00 a.m., ESPN+ | | vs. Liberty; Betty Chancellor Classic | W 72–47 | 7–1 | 12 – Weathers | 7 – Cody | 4 – Williams | Merrell Center; Katy, TX |
| November 30, 2023*; 6:00 p.m., ACCN | | at Syracuse; ACC–SEC Challenge | L 73–79 | 7–2 | 18 – Barker | 9 – Cody | 8 – Barker | JMA Wireless Dome (1,819); Syracuse, NY |
| December 6, 2023*; 11:30 a.m., SECN+ | | Coastal Carolina | W 88–46 | 8–2 | 17 – Barker | 6 – Cunningham | 3 – Tied | Coleman Coliseum (1,925); Tuscaloosa, AL |
| December 9, 2023*; 2:00 p.m., SECN+ | | Stephen F. Austin | W 74–69 | 9–2 | 22 – Nye | 7 – Barker | 8 – Barker | Coleman Coliseum (2,202); Tuscaloosa, AL |
| December 10, 2023*; 2:00 p.m., SECN+ | | Samford | W 69–39 | 10–2 | 11 – Tied | 11 – Newman | 3 – Tied | Coleman Coliseum (2,135); Tuscaloosa, AL |
| December 17, 2023*; 12:00 p.m., SECN | | Louisiana–Monroe | W 70–54 | 11–2 | 18 – Barker | 9 – Cody | 3 – Tied | Coleman Coliseum (2,188); Tuscaloosa, AL |
| December 20, 2023*; 6:00 p.m., SECN+ | | Jacksonville | W 99–61 | 12–2 | 22 – Timmons | 7 – Newman | 6 – McQueen | Coleman Coliseum (2,036); Tuscaloosa, AL |
| December 31, 2023*; 2:00 p.m., SECN+ | | Mississippi Valley State | W 91–26 | 13–2 | 18 – Tied | 7 – Tied | 5 – Weathers | Coleman Coliseum (2,036); Tuscaloosa, AL |
SEC regular season
| January 4, 2024; 6:00 p.m., SECN+ | | Ole Miss | L 45–55 | 13–3 (0–1) | 15 – Barker | 8 – Tied | 4 – Tied | Coleman Coliseum (2,140); Tuscaloosa, AL |
| January 7, 2024; 5:00 p.m., SECN | | at Missouri | W 79–64 | 14–3 (1–1) | 23 – Tied | 7 – Barker | 5 – Timmons | Mizzou Arena (4,851); Columbia, MO |
| January 11, 2024; 6:00 p.m., SECN+ | | at Georgia | W 81–63 | 15–3 (2–1) | 22 – Barker | 8 – Barker | 5 – Barker | Stegeman Coliseum (2,641); Athens, GA |
| January 14, 2024; 2:00 p.m., SECN | | Arkansas | L 59–77 | 15–4 (2–2) | 18 – Barker | 7 – Nye | 4 – McQueen | Coleman Coliseum (2,467); Tuscaloosa, AL |
| January 18, 2024; 8:00 p.m., SECN | | No. 10 LSU | L 58–78 | 15–5 (2–3) | 18 – Nye | 8 – Cody | 4 – Barker | Coleman Coliseum (5,575); Tuscaloosa, AL |
| January 21, 2024; 2:00 p.m., SECN+ | | at Auburn | L 65–78 | 15–6 (2–4) | 26 – Timmons | 6 – Tied | 4 – Barker | Neville Arena (6,075); Auburn, AL |
| January 28, 2024; 4:00 p.m., SECN | | Kentucky | W 91–74 | 16–6 (3–4) | 34 – Barker | 10 – Tied | 4 – Timmons | Coleman Coliseum (2,444); Tuscaloosa, AL |
| February 1, 2024; 8:00 p.m., SECN | | at Arkansas | W 86–70 | 17–6 (4–4) | 25 – Barker | 11 – Barker | 6 – McQueen | Bud Walton Arena (2,756); Fayetteville, AR |
| February 5, 2024; 6:00 p.m., SECN | | at Vanderbilt | W 74–66 | 18–6 (5–4) | 24 – Barker | 9 – Barker | 6 – Barker | Memorial Gymnasium (2,057); Nashville, TN |
| February 8, 2024; 6:00 p.m., SECN+ | | Tennessee | W 72–56 | 19–6 (6–4) | 23 – Nye | 8 – Cody | 4 – Tied | Coleman Coliseum (2,655); Tuscaloosa, AL |
| February 11, 2024; 3:00 p.m., ESPN2 | | at No. 13 LSU | L 66–85 | 19–7 (6–5) | 19 – Nye | 7 – Barker | 6 – Timmons | Pete Maravich Assembly Center (12,228); Baton Rouge, LA |
| February 18, 2024; 2:00 p.m., SECN+ | | Auburn | W 67–61 | 20–7 (7–5) | 26 – Barker | 7 – Tied | 5 – Timmons | Coleman Coliseum (3,569); Tuscaloosa, AL |
| February 22, 2024; 6:00 p.m., SECN | | at No. 1 South Carolina | L 44–72 | 20–8 (7–6) | 20 – Timmons | 8 – Timmons | 3 – McQueen | Colonial Life Arena (16,229); Columbia, SC |
| February 25, 2024; 4:00 p.m., SECN | | Mississippi State | W 87–75 | 21–8 (8–6) | 28 – Nye | 12 – Barker | 5 – Barker | Coleman Coliseum (2,980); Tuscaloosa, AL |
| February 29, 2024; 6:00 p.m., SECN+ | | Florida | W 76–73 | 22–8 (9–6) | 18 – Barker | 8 – Tied | 3 – Tied | Coleman Coliseum (2,257); Tuscaloosa, AL |
| March 3, 2024; 2:00 p.m., SECN+ | | at Texas A&M | W 78–71 | 23–8 (10–6) | 29 – Barker | 8 – Timmons | 4 – McQueen | Reed Arena (3,526); College Station, TX |
SEC Tournament
| March 8, 2024; 1:30 p.m., SECN | (4) | vs. (5) Tennessee; Quarterfinals | L 61–83 | 23–9 | 17 – Barker | 7 – Barker | 5 – Barker | Bon Secours Wellness Arena (8,841); Greenville, SC |
NCAA Tournament
| March 22, 2024*; 4:30 p.m., ESPN2 | (8 P4) | vs. (9 P4) Florida State; First round | W 82–74 | 24–9 | 20 – Cody | 14 – Cody | 6 – McQueen | Moody Center (7,487); Austin, TX |
| March 24, 2024*; 5:00 p.m., ESPN | (8 P4) | at (1 P4) No. 4 Texas; Second round | L 54–65 | 24–10 | 17 – Barker | 6 – Tied | 4 – Nye | Moody Center (9,753); Austin, TX |
*Non-conference game. ^{#}Rankings from AP Poll. (#) Tournament seedings in parentheses. P4=Portland 4. All times are in Central Time.

== See also ==
- 2023–24 Alabama Crimson Tide men's basketball team
