= 2023–24 Kentucky Wildcats women's basketball team =

Intercollegiate basketball season

2023–24 Kentucky Wildcats women's basketball
- Conference: Southeastern Conference
- Record: 12–20 (4–12 SEC)
- Head coach: Kyra Elzy (4th season)
- Associate head coach: Niya Butts
- Assistant coaches: Jen Hoover; Crystal Kelly
- Home arena: Rupp Arena

2023–24 SEC women's basketball standings
	Conf.				Overall
Team	W		L	PCT	W		L	PCT
No. 1 South Carolina †	16	–	0	1.000	38	–	0	1.000
No. 6 LSU	13	–	3	.813	31	–	6	.838
Ole Miss	12	–	4	.750	24	–	9	.727
Alabama	10	–	6	.625	24	–	10	.706
Tennessee	10	–	6	.625	20	–	13	.606
Vanderbilt	9	–	7	.563	23	–	10	.697
Mississippi State	8	–	8	.500	23	–	12	.657
Auburn	8	–	8	.500	20	–	12	.625
Texas A&M	6	–	10	.375	19	–	13	.594
Arkansas	6	–	10	.375	18	–	15	.545
Florida	5	–	11	.313	16	–	16	.500
Kentucky	4	–	12	.250	12	–	20	.375
Georgia	3	–	13	.188	12	–	18	.400
Missouri	2	–	14	.125	11	–	19	.367
† 2024 SEC tournament winner Rankings from AP poll

The 2023–24 Kentucky Wildcats women's basketball team represented the University of Kentucky during the 2023–24 NCAA Division I women's basketball season. The Wildcats, led by fourth-year head coach Kyra Elzy, played most of their home games at Rupp Arena as Memorial Coliseum underwent extensive renovations this season and compete as members of the Southeastern Conference (SEC). The Wildcats played five games at other venues in and near their home city of Lexington, Kentucky. Four home games, including the season opener, were at the Clive M. Beck Center at Transylvania University in Lexington, and one was at Davis–Reid Alumni Gym at Georgetown College in Georgetown.

On March 11, 2024, following back-to-back losing seasons and after failing to qualify for the NCAA Tournament in consecutive years, Kentucky announced that Elzy had been fired as head coach.

== Previous season ==
The Wildcats finished the 2022–23 season 12–19, 2–14 in SEC play to finish in a tie for 13th (last) place. In the SEC tournament, they upset Florida in the first round, and Alabama in the second round, before falling to Tennessee in the quarterfinals.

== Roster ==
2023–24 Kentucky Wildcats women's basketball team
Players
Coaches

Pos.	#	Name	Height	Year	Previous school	Hometown
G	0	Brooklynn Miles	5 ft 5 in (1.65 m)	Jr	Tennessee	Frankfort, Kentucky
G	2	Saniah Tyler	5 ft 6 in (1.68 m)	So	Incarnate Word Academy	Florissant, Missouri
G	3	Jordy Griggs	6 ft 2 in (1.88 m)	Fr	Montverde Academy	Moreno Valley, California
G	4	Eniya Russell	6 ft 0 in (1.83 m)	Sr	South Carolina	Baltimore, Maryland
G	5	Cassidy Rowe	5 ft 5 in (1.65 m)	So	Shelby Valley High School	Virgie, Kentucky
F	13	Ajae Petty	6 ft 3 in (1.91 m)	Sr	LSU	Baltimore, Maryland
G	20	Amiya Jenkins	5 ft 10 in (1.78 m)	So	Anderson County High School	Lexington, Kentucky
F	21	Nyah Leveretter	6 ft 2 in (1.88 m)	Sr	Westwood High School	Blythewood, South Carolina
G	22	Maddie Scherr	5 ft 10 in (1.78 m)	Sr	Oregon	Florence, Kentucky
G	34	Emma King	5 ft 10 in (1.78 m)	GS	Lincoln County High School	Stanford, Kentucky
F	44	Janae Walker	6 ft 3 in (1.91 m)	Fr	Sandy Creek High School	Tyrone, Georgia

Head coach

- Kyra Elzy (Tennessee)

Assistant coach(es)

- Niya Butts (Tennessee)
- Jen Hoover (Wake Forest)
- Crystal Kelly (Western Kentucky)

Legend

- (C) Team captain
- (S) Suspended
- (I) Ineligible
- (W) Walk-on
- Injured
- Current redshirt

Roster
Last update: March 20, 2024

== Schedule and results ==
Date time, TV	Rank^{#}	Opponent^{#}	Result	Record	High points	High rebounds	High assists	Site (attendance) city, state
Exhibition
November 1, 2023*; 11:00 a.m.		Kentucky State	W 88–71		–	–	–	Rupp Arena (5,457); Lexington, KY
Non-conference regular season
November 7, 2023*; 7:00 p.m., SECN+		East Tennessee State	W 74–66	1–0	16 – Jenkins	13 – Petty	4 – Miles	Clive M. Beck Center (1,139); Lexington, KY
November 11, 2023*; 6:00 p.m., SECN+		USC Upstate	W 82–54	2–0	19 – Petty	9 – Petty	6 – Scherr	Rupp Arena (1,465); Lexington, KY
November 14, 2023*; 6:00 p.m., SECN+		Austin Peay	L 63–68	2–1	19 – Petty	14 – Petty	7 – Miles	Davis–Reid Alumni Gym (935); Georgetown, KY
November 19, 2023*; 2:00 p.m., ESPN+		at Florida Gulf Coast	L 48–59	2–2	18 – Jenkins	13 – Petty	3 – Miles	Alico Arena (1,863); Fort Myers, FL
November 23, 2023*; 3:15 p.m., ESPN+		vs. No. 10 NC State; Paradise Jam Island Division	L 55–84	2–3	9 – 3 Tied	6 – 2 Tied	2 – Rowe	Sports and Fitness Center (624); Saint Thomas, USVI
November 24, 2023*; 1:00 p.m., ESPN+		vs. No. 3 Colorado; Paradise Jam Island Division	L 53–96	2–4	14 – Russell	7 – Petty	3 – Scherr	Sports and Fitness Center; Saint Thomas, USVI
November 25, 2023*; 3:15 p.m., ESPN+		vs. Cincinnati; Paradise Jam Island Division	L 41–65	2–5	25 – Scherr	7 – Petty	2 – Miles	Sports and Fitness Center (924); Saint Thomas, USVI
November 30, 2023*; 7:00 p.m., SECN		Boston College; ACC–SEC Challenge	W 83–81	3–5	21 – Russell	8 – Petty	6 – Miles	Clive M. Beck Center (910); Lexington, KY
December 3, 2023*; 1:00 p.m., SECN+		Tennessee Tech	W 73–67	4–5	33 – Petty	15 – Petty	6 – Rowe	Clive M. Beck Center (743); Lexington, KY
December 6, 2023*; 7:00 p.m., SECN+		Minnesota	L 57–76	4–6	20 – Petty	12 – Petty	5 – 2 Tied	Rupp Arena (3,386); Lexington, KY
December 10, 2023*; 2:00 p.m., ACCN		at No. 18 Louisville rivalry	L 61–73	4–7	22 – Scherr	10 – Petty	6 – King	KFC Yum! Center (11,291); Louisville, KY
December 17, 2023*; 1:00 p.m., SECN+		Furman	W 75–45	5–7	17 – Tyler	9 – Petty	8 – Scherr	Rupp Arena (3,287); Lexington, KY
December 21, 2023*; 11:00 a.m., SECN+		Lipscomb	W 87–80	6–7	25 – Scherr	6 – Petty	7 – Scherr	Rupp Arena (3,424); Lexington, KY
December 31, 2023*; 1:00 p.m., SECN+		Samford	W 72–59	7–7	22 – Petty	13 – Petty	6 – Miles	Clive M. Beck Center (1,010); Lexington, KY
SEC regular season
January 4, 2024; 7:00 p.m., SECN+		Arkansas	W 73–63	8–7 (1–0)	22 – Petty	19 – Petty	3 – 2 Tied	Rupp Arena (2,998); Lexington, KY
January 7, 2024; 12:00 p.m., SECN		at Tennessee rivalry	L 69–87	8–8 (1–1)	16 – Russell	14 – Petty	5 – Scherr	Thompson–Boling Arena (8,823); Knoxville, TN
January 11, 2024; 7:00 p.m., SECN+		Vanderbilt	L 73–95	8–9 (1–2)	23 – Petty	21 – Petty	3 – Scherr	Rupp Arena (3,339); Lexington, KY
January 15, 2024; 7:00 p.m., SECN		at No. 1 South Carolina	L 36–98	8–10 (1–3)	13 – Tyler	5 – Petty	2 – Scherr	Colonial Life Arena (15,929); Columbia, SC
January 21, 2024; 2:00 p.m., SECN+		Missouri	W 76–71	9–10 (2–3)	20 – Russell	10 – Petty	6 – Scherr	Rupp Arena (3,665); Lexington, KY
January 25, 2024; 8:00 p.m., SECN+		at Arkansas	L 61–88	9–11 (2–4)	20 – Russell	16 – Petty	2 – 2 Tied	Bud Walton Arena (3,719); Fayetteville, AR
January 28, 2024; 5:00 p.m., SECN		at Alabama	L 74–91	9–12 (2–5)	14 – 2 Tied	9 – Scherr	6 – Scherr	Coleman Coliseum (2,444); Tuscaloosa, AL
February 1, 2024; 7:00 p.m., SECN+		Mississippi State	L 74–77 ^{OT}	9–13 (2–6)	19 – Scherr	10 – Petty	5 – Scherr	Rupp Arena (3,743); Lexington, KY
February 4, 2024; 12:00 pm, SECN		at Georgia	L 65–72	9–14 (2–7)	25 – Petty	5 – Petty	4 – Scherr	Stegeman Coliseum (3,177); Athens, GA
February 11, 2024; 4:00 p.m., SECN		Texas A&M	L 44–61	9–15 (2–8)	11 – Petty	7 – Petty	3 – Miles	Rupp Arena (3,632); Lexington, KY
February 15, 2024; 7:00 p.m., SECN		at Auburn	L 50–78	9–16 (2–9)	13 – Petty	13 – Petty	3 – Miles	Neville Arena (2,653); Auburn, AL
February 18, 2024; 12:00 p.m., SECN		Florida	W 81–77	10–16 (3–9)	24 – Russell	11 – Petty	3 – Russell	Rupp Arena (4,692); Lexington, KY
February 22, 2024; 7:30 p.m., SECN+		at Mississippi State	W 78–68	11–16 (4–9)	20 – Petty	12 – Petty	7 – Scherr	Humphrey Coliseum (5,975); Starkville, MS
February 25, 2024; 3:00 p.m., SECN		No. 1 South Carolina	L 55–103	11–17 (4–10)	16 – Petty	8 – Petty	3 – Miles	Rupp Arena (5,626); Lexington, KY
February 29, 2024; 7:00 p.m., SECN+		Ole Miss	L 45–75	11–18 (4–11)	10 – 2 Tied	6 – Russell	2 – 3 Tied	Rupp Arena (3,227); Lexington, KY
March 3, 2024; 2:00 p.m., SECN		at No. 9 LSU	L 56–77	11–19 (4–12)	14 – 2 Tied	15 – Petty	7 – Miles	Pete Maravich Assembly Center (13,044); Baton Rouge, LA
SEC Tournament
March 6, 2024; 11:00 a.m., SECN	(12)	vs. (13) Georgia; First Round	W 64–50	12–19	19 – Russell	14 – Petty	5 – Miles	Bon Secours Wellness Arena (8,409); Greenville, SC
March 7, 2024; 2:30 p.m., SECN	(12)	vs. (5) Tennessee; Second Round	L 62–76	12–20	17 – Tyler	10 – Petty	3 – Miles	Bon Secours Wellness Arena (6,144); Greenville, SC
*Non-conference game. ^{#}Rankings from AP Poll. (#) Tournament seedings in parentheses. All times are in Eastern Time.

== See also ==
- 2023–24 Kentucky Wildcats men's basketball team
