= 2024 SEC women's basketball tournament =

American college basketball postseason tournament

- Classification: Division I
- Season: 2023–24
- Teams: 14
- Site: Bon Secours Wellness Arena; Greenville, SC
- Champions: South Carolina (8th title)
- Winning coach: Dawn Staley (8th title)
- MVP: MiLaysia Fulwiley (South Carolina)
- Attendance: 64,905
- Television: SEC Network, ESPNU, ESPN

2023–24 SEC women's basketball standings
	Conf.				Overall
Team	W		L	PCT	W		L	PCT
No. 1 South Carolina †	16	–	0	1.000	38	–	0	1.000
No. 6 LSU	13	–	3	.813	31	–	6	.838
Ole Miss	12	–	4	.750	24	–	9	.727
Alabama	10	–	6	.625	24	–	10	.706
Tennessee	10	–	6	.625	20	–	13	.606
Vanderbilt	9	–	7	.563	23	–	10	.697
Mississippi State	8	–	8	.500	23	–	12	.657
Auburn	8	–	8	.500	20	–	12	.625
Texas A&M	6	–	10	.375	19	–	13	.594
Arkansas	6	–	10	.375	18	–	15	.545
Florida	5	–	11	.313	16	–	16	.500
Kentucky	4	–	12	.250	12	–	20	.375
Georgia	3	–	13	.188	12	–	18	.400
Missouri	2	–	14	.125	11	–	19	.367
† 2024 SEC tournament winner Rankings from AP poll

The 2024 Southeastern Conference women's basketball tournament was the postseason women's basketball tournament for the Southeastern Conference held at the Bon Secours Wellness Arena in Greenville, South Carolina, from March 6 through 10, 2024. As the tournament winner, South Carolina earned the conference's automatic bid to the 2024 NCAA Division I women's basketball tournament.

== Seeds ==
Seed	School	Conference record	Overall record	Tiebreaker
1	South Carolina^{‡†}	16–0	29–0	
2	LSU^{†}	13–3	26–4	
3	Ole Miss^{†}	12–4	22–7	
4	Alabama^{†}	10–6	23–8	1–0 vs. Tennessee
5	Tennessee^{#}	10–6	17–11	0–1 vs. Alabama
6	Vanderbilt^{#}	9–7	22–8	
7	Auburn^{#}	8–8	19–10	1–0 vs. Mississippi State
8	Mississippi State^{#}	8–8	21–10	0–1 vs. Auburn
9	Texas A&M^{#}	6–10	18–11	1–0 vs. Arkansas
10	Arkansas^{#}	6–10	18–13	0–1 vs. Texas A&M
11	Florida	5–11	14–14	
12	Kentucky	4–12	11–19	
13	Georgia	3–13	12–17	
14	Missouri	2–14	11–18	
‡ – SEC regular season champions, and tournament No. 1 seed. † – Received a double-bye in the conference tournament. # – Received a single-bye in the conference tournament. Overall records include all games played in the SEC Tournament.

== Schedule ==
Game	Time*	Matchup^{#}	Score	Television	Attendance
First round – Wednesday, March 6
1	11:00 am	No. 12 Kentucky vs. No. 13 Georgia	64–50	SEC Network	8,409
2	1:30 pm	No. 11 Florida vs. No. 14 Missouri	66–60	SEC Network	8,409
Second round – Thursday, March 7
3	Noon	No. 8 Mississippi State vs. No. 9 Texas A&M	56–72	SEC Network	6,144
4	2:30 pm	No. 5 Tennessee vs. No. 12 Kentucky	76−62	SEC Network	6,144
5	6:00 pm	No. 7 Auburn vs. No. 10 Arkansas	67−48	SEC Network	7,187
6	8:30 pm	No. 6 Vanderbilt vs. No. 11 Florida	62–59	SEC Network	7,187
Quarterfinals – Friday, March 8
7	Noon	No. 1 South Carolina vs. No. 9 Texas A&M	79–68	SEC Network	8,841
8	2:30 pm	No. 4 Alabama vs. No. 5 Tennessee	83–61	SEC Network	8,841
9	6:00 pm	No. 2 LSU vs. No. 7 Auburn	78–48	SEC Network	8,377
10	8:30 pm	No. 3 Ole Miss vs. No. 11 Florida	84–74	SEC Network	8,377
Semifinals – Saturday, March 9
11	4:30 pm	No. 1 South Carolina vs No. 5 Tennessee	74–73	ESPNU	12,784
12	7:00 pm	No. 2 LSU vs No. 3 Ole Miss	75–67	ESPNU	12,784
Championship – Sunday, March 10
13	3:00 pm	No. 1 South Carolina vs No. 2 LSU	79–72	ESPN	13,163
*Game times in ET. # – Rankings denote tournament seed

== Bracket ==
First round Wednesday, March 6 SECN
12	Kentucky	64
13	Georgia	50
11	Florida	66
14	Missouri	60

Second round Thursday, March 7 SECN
8	Mississippi State	56
9	Texas A&M	72
5	Tennessee	76
12	Kentucky	62
7	Auburn	67
10	Arkansas	48
6	Vanderbilt	59
11	Florida	62

Quarterfinals; Friday, March 8 SECN
1	South Carolina	79
9	Texas A&M	68
4	Alabama	61
5	Tennessee	83
2	LSU	78
7	Auburn	48
3	Ole Miss	84
11	Florida	74

Semifinals; Saturday, March 9 ESPNU
1	South Carolina	74
5	Tennessee	73
2	LSU	75
3	Ole Miss	67

Championship; Sunday, March 10; ESPN
1	South Carolina	79
2	LSU	72
