= 2023–24 Chattanooga Mocs women's basketball team =

American college basketball season

2023–24 Chattanooga Mocs women's basketball

SoCon regular-season and tournament champions

NCAA tournament, first round
- Conference: Southern Conference
- Record: 28–5 (13–1 SoCon)
- Head coach: Shawn Poppie (2nd season)
- Assistant coaches: Jonathon Goldberg; Katelyn Grisillo; Jayda Worthy
- Home arena: McKenzie Arena

2023–24 Southern Conference women's basketball standings
	Conf.				Overall
Team	W		L	PCT	W		L	PCT
Chattanooga †	13	–	1	.929	28	–	5	.848
UNC Greensboro	8	–	6	.571	21	–	12	.636
Wofford	8	–	6	.571	17	–	13	.567
Mercer	8	–	6	.571	15	–	17	.469
East Tennessee State	7	–	7	.500	18	–	12	.600
Samford	6	–	8	.429	14	–	16	.467
Furman	5	–	9	.357	15	–	16	.484
Western Carolina	1	–	13	.071	6	–	24	.200
† 2024 SoCon tournament winner

The 2023–24 Chattanooga Mocs women's basketball team represented the University of Tennessee at Chattanooga during the 2023–24 NCAA Division I women's basketball season. The Mocs, led by second-year head coach Shawn Poppie, played their home games at the McKenzie Arena in Chattanooga, Tennessee as members of the Southern Conference (SoCon).

== Previous season ==
The Mocs finished the 2022–23 season 20–13, 9–5 in SoCon play, to finish in a tie for second place. As a No. 2 seed in the SoCon tournament they defeated Furman, East Tennessee State and Wofford to win SoCon tournament. They received an automatic bid to the NCAA tournament as No. 16 seed in the Seattle Regional 3, where they lost in the first round to Virginia Tech.

== Roster ==
2023–24 Chattanooga Mocs women's basketball team
Players
Coaches

Pos.	#	Name	Height	Year	Previous school	Hometown
G	1	Eleecia Carter	5 ft 7 in (1.7 m)	Fr	Lake Highland Prep	Winter Garden, FL
G	2	Hannah Kohn	5 ft 9 in (1.75 m)	Fr	The Master's Academy/Hagerty	Oviedo, FL
F/C	3	Takia Davis	6 ft 2 in (1.88 m)	Jr	Calhoun County; USC Aiken	Calhoun, GA
G	5	Sigrún Björg Ólafsdóttir	5 ft 9 in (1.75 m)	Jr	Flensborg	Hafnarfjörður, Iceland
G	11	Caia Elisaldez	5 ft 5 in (1.65 m)	Fr	Mater Dei	Whittier, CA
F	15	Forde Flos van der Schans	6 ft 4 in (1.93 m)	RS Fr	Orange Lions Academy	Amsterdam, the Netherlands
G	21	Addie Porter	5 ft 4 in (1.63 m)	Jr	Lebanon	Lebanon, TN
G	24	Jada Guinn	5 ft 8 in (1.73 m)	GS	Oak Ridge; Tennessee Tech	Oak Ridge, TN
F	25	Kailyn Farrell	6 ft 1 in (1.85 m)	Jr	Tullahoma; Walters State CC	Tullahoma, TN
F	32	Raven Thompson	5 ft 10 in (1.78 m)	So	Langston Hughes	Atlanta, GA
F	33	Karsen Murphy	6 ft 0 in (1.83 m)	Jr	Dawson County; Montana	Glendive, MT

Head coach

- Shawn Poppie (Limestone)

Assistant coach(es)

- Jonathon Goldberg (Emerson College)
- Katelyn Grisillo (USC Aiken)
- Jayda Worthy (Radford)

Legend

- (C) Team captain
- (S) Suspended
- (I) Ineligible
- (W) Walk-on
- Injured
- Current redshirt

Roster
Last update: October 11, 2024

== Schedule ==
Date time, TV	Rank^{#}	Opponent^{#}	Result	Record	Site (attendance) city, state
Non-conference regular season
November 6, 2023*; 11:00 a.m., ESPN+		King University	W 88–32	1–0	McKenzie Arena (2,405); Chattanooga, TN
November 10, 2023*; 7:00 p.m., ESPN+		at Austin Peay	W 57–52	2–0	F&M Bank Arena (571); Clarksville, TN
November 12, 2023*; 2:00 p.m., ESPN+		Marshall	L 74–79	2–1	McKenzie Arena (1,283); Chattanooga, TN
November 15, 2023*; 7:00 p.m., ESPN+		Tennessee Tech	W 70–45	3–1	McKenzie Arena (2,428); Chattanooga, TN
November 18, 2023*; 3:00 p.m., ESPN+		Virginia–Wise	W 75–62	4–1	McKenzie Arena (1,214); Chattanooga, TN
November 24, 2023*; 5:45 p.m., FloHoops		vs. Kent State; Daytona Beach Classic	W 64–54	5–1	Ocean Center (200); Daytona Beach, FL
November 25, 2023*; 8:00 p.m., FloHoops		vs. Northern Kentucky; Daytona Beach Classic	W 63–47	6–1	Ocean Center (150); Daytona Beach, FL
November 29, 2023*; 7:00 p.m., ESPN+		at Kennesaw State	W 49–43	7–1	KSU Convocation Center (414); Kennesaw, GA
December 3, 2023*; 2:00 p.m., ESPN+		No. 21 Mississippi State	W 59–53	8–1	McKenzie Arena (2,170); Chattanooga, TN
December 9, 2023*; 2:00 p.m., ESPN+		North Alabama	W 68–65	9–1	McKenzie Arena (1,233); Chattanooga, TN
December 14, 2023*; 7:00 p.m., ESPN+		at Lipscomb	W 72–62	10–1	Allen Arena (533); Nashville, TN
December 17, 2023*; 6:00 p.m., ESPN+		Eastern Kentucky	W 52–44	11–1	McKenzie Arena (1,322); Chattanooga, TN
December 20, 2023*; 7:00 p.m., Baller TV		vs. Coastal Carolina; Cherokee Invitational	L 49–53	11–2	Harrah's Cherokee (1,036); Cherokee, NC
December 21, 2023*; 7:00 p.m., Baller TV		vs. Richmond; Cherokee Invitational	L 60–64	11–3	Harrah's Cherokee (422); Cherokee, NC
January 3, 2024*; 7:00 p.m., ESPN+		North Carolina Central	W 65–59	12–3	McKenzie Arena (1,301); Chattanooga, TN
SoCon regular season
January 10, 2024; 7:00 p.m., ESPN+		Mercer	W 66–57	13–3 (1–0)	McKenzie Arena (1,446); Chattanooga, TN
January 10, 2024; 7:00 p.m., ESPN+		Samford	W 75–52	14–3 (2–0)	McKenzie Arena (1,394); Chattanooga, TN
January 20, 2024; 2:00 p.m., ESPN+		East Tennessee State	W 52–50	15–3 (3–0)	McKenzie Arena (1,849); Chattanooga, TN
January 25, 2024; 7:00 p.m., ESPN+		at UNC Greensboro	W 73–55	16–3 (4–0)	Fleming Gymnasium (406); Greensboro, NC
January 27, 2024; 2:00 p.m., ESPN+		at Western Carolina	W 69–59	17–3 (5–0)	Ramsey Center (795); Cullowhee, NC
February 1, 2024; 7:00 p.m., ESPN+		Wofford	W 57–51	18–3 (6–0)	McKenzie Arena (1,405); Chattanooga, TN
February 3, 2024; 7:00 p.m., ESPN+		Furman	W 79–62	19–3 (7–0)	McKenzie Arena; Chattanooga, TN
February 8, 2024; 7:00 p.m., ESPN+		at Samford	W 55–39	20–3 (8–0)	Pete Hanna Center (723); Birmingham, AL
February 10, 2024; 2:00 p.m., ESPN+		at Mercer	W 61–52	21–3 (9–0)	Hawkins Arena (1,627); Macon, GA
February 17, 2024; 2:00 p.m., ESPN+		at East Tennessee State	W 56–41	22–3 (10–0)	Brooks Gymnasium (817); Johnson City, TN
February 22, 2024; 7:00 p.m., ESPN+		Western Carolina	W 60–56	23–3 (11–0)	McKenzie Arena (1,549); Chattanooga, TN
February 22, 2024; 2:00 p.m., ESPN+		Western Carolina	L 64–68	23–4 (11–1)	McKenzie Arena (1,783); Chattanooga, TN
February 29, 2024; 7:00 p.m., ESPN+		at Furman	W 60–53	24–4 (12–1)	Timmons Arena (344); Greenville, SC
March 2, 2024; 2:00 p.m., ESPN+		at Wofford	W 84–67	25–4 (13–1)	Jerry Richardson Indoor Stadium (854); Spartanburg, SC
SoCon women's tournament
March 7, 2024; 12:00 p.m., ESPN+	(1)	vs. (8) Western Carolina; Quarterfinals	W 64–43	26–4	Harrah's Cherokee Center; Asheville, NC
March 8, 2024; 11:00 a.m., ESPN+	(1)	vs. (4) Mercer; Semifinals	W 66–55	27–4	Harrah's Cherokee Center; Asheville, NC
March 10, 2024; 12:00 p.m., ESPNU	(1)	vs. (2) UNC Greensboro; Championship	W 69–60	28–4	Harrah's Cherokee Center; Asheville, NC
NCAA women's tournament
March 23, 2024*; 2:30 p.m., ESPNU	(14 P4)	at (3 P4) No. 11 NC State; First round	L 45–64	28–5	Reynolds Coliseum (4,901); Raleigh, NC
*Non-conference game. ^{#}Rankings from AP poll. (#) Tournament seedings in parentheses. P4=Portland 4. All times are in Eastern.
