= 2023–24 Wofford Terriers women's basketball team =

American college basketball season

2023–24 Wofford Terriers women's basketball
- Conference: Southern Conference
- Record: 17–13 (8–6 SoCon)
- Head coach: Jimmy Garrity (8th season)
- Associate head coach: Mike Merrill
- Assistant coaches: Trent Bunn; Ashley Raley-Ross
- Home arena: Jerry Richardson Indoor Stadium

2023–24 Southern Conference women's basketball standings
	Conf.				Overall
Team	W		L	PCT	W		L	PCT
Chattanooga †	13	–	1	.929	28	–	5	.848
UNC Greensboro	8	–	6	.571	21	–	12	.636
Wofford	8	–	6	.571	17	–	13	.567
Mercer	8	–	6	.571	15	–	17	.469
East Tennessee State	7	–	7	.500	18	–	12	.600
Samford	6	–	8	.429	14	–	16	.467
Furman	5	–	9	.357	15	–	16	.484
Western Carolina	1	–	13	.071	6	–	24	.200
† 2024 SoCon tournament winner

The 2023–24 Wofford Terriers women's basketball team represented Wofford College during the 2023–24 NCAA Division I women's basketball season. The Terriers, who were led by eighth-year head coach Jimmy Garrity, played their home games at Jerry Richardson Indoor Stadium in Spartanburg, South Carolina as members of the Southern Conference (SoCon).

The Terriers finished the season 17–13, 8–6 in SoCon play, to finish in a three-way tie for second place. They defeated Samford before falling to UNC Greensboro in the semifinals of the SoCon tournament.

== Previous season ==
The Terriers finished the 2022–23 season 22–10, 10–4 in SoCon play, to finish as SoCon regular-season champions. They defeated Western Carolina in the quarterfinals of the SoCon tournament and UNC Greensboro in the semifinals, before falling to Chattanooga in the championship game. They received an automatic bid into the WNIT, where they lost to Florida in the first round.

== Roster ==
2023–24 Wofford Terriers women's basketball team
Players
Coaches

Pos.	#	Name	Height	Year	Previous school	Hometown
G	0	Ja'Rae Smith	5 ft 6 in (1.68 m)	Sr	Woodmont High School	Piedmont, SC
G	1	Annabelle Schultz	5 ft 7 in (1.7 m)	Sr	Erwin High School	Asheville, NC
G	2	Maddie Heiss	5 ft 10 in (1.78 m)	Fr	Bishop Lynch High School	Dallas, TX
G/F	3	Evangelia Paulk	6 ft 0 in (1.83 m)	Fr	Asheville High School	Asheville, NC
F	4	Yinka Kruyswijk	6 ft 2 in (1.88 m)	Fr	International School of Amsterdam	Amsterdam, Netherlands
G	5	Helen Matthews	5 ft 10 in (1.78 m)	Sr	Kaiapoi High School	Kaiapoi, New Zealand
G	10	Libby Privett	5 ft 8 in (1.73 m)	So	Madison Academy	Huntsville, AL
F	11	Vitolia Tuilave	6 ft 2 in (1.88 m)	Fr	Mount Maunganui College	Mount Maunganui, New Zealand
G	12	Rachael Rose	5 ft 7 in (1.7 m)	Jr	USC Upstate	Scranton, PA
G	20	Indiya Clarke	5 ft 11 in (1.8 m)	So	Cony High School	Wasilla, AK
F	21	Mia Flor	6 ft 2 in (1.88 m)	Jr	Idaho State	Missoula, MT
G	24	Sara Deidda	5 ft 11 in (1.8 m)	Fr	Trgovacka škola Zagreb	Zagreb, Croatia

Head coach

- Jimmy Garrity (Elon)

Assistant coach(es)

- Mike Merrill (UNC Wilmington)
- Trent Bunn (North Carolina)
- Ashley Raley-Ross (Queens (NC))

Legend

- (C) Team captain
- (S) Suspended
- (I) Ineligible
- (W) Walk-on
- Injured
- Current redshirt

Roster
Last update: May 29, 2024

== Schedule and results ==
Date time, TV	Rank^{#}	Opponent^{#}	Result	Record	Site (attendance) city, state
Non-conference regular season
November 6, 2023*; 5:00 p.m., ACCNX		at Wake Forest	L 65–75	0–1	LJVM Coliseum (712); Winston-Salem, NC
November 9, 2023*; 7:00 p.m., ESPN+		Erskine	W 85–47	1–1	Jerry Richardson Indoor Stadium (789); Spartanburg, SC
November 11, 2023*; 3:00 p.m., ESPN+		UNC Wilmington	W 74–49	2–1	Jerry Richardson Indoor Stadium (428); Spartanburg, SC
November 14, 2023*; 7:00 p.m., ESPN+		North Carolina Central	W 82–52	3–1	Jerry Richardson Indoor Stadium (512); Spartanburg, SC
November 17, 2023*; 7:00 p.m., ESPN+		at High Point	L 64–80	3–2	Qubein Center (937); High Point, NC
November 21, 2023*; 11:00 a.m., ESPN+		at Davidson	L 51–81	3–3	John M. Belk Arena (2,761); Davidson, NC
November 27, 2023*; 7:00 p.m., ESPN+		Southern Wesleyan	W 65–42	4–3	Jerry Richardson Indoor Stadium (386); Spartanburg, SC
November 29, 2023*; 7:00 p.m., ESPN+		UNC Asheville	W 63–54	5–3	Jerry Richardson Indoor Stadium (340); Spartanburg, SC
December 2, 2023*; 2:00 p.m., ESPN+		Bellarmine	L 59–61	5–4	Jerry Richardson Indoor Stadium (323); Spartanburg, SC
December 4, 2023*; 7:00 p.m., ESPN+		Emory & Henry	W 60–34	6–4	Jerry Richardson Indoor Stadium (412); Spartanburg, SC
December 16, 2023*; 1:00 p.m., ACCNX		at Virginia	W 71–70	7–4	John Paul Jones Arena (3,955); Charlottesville, VA
December 19, 2023*; 6:30 p.m., SECN+		at Tennessee	L 63–85	7–5	Thompson–Boling Arena (7,900); Knoxville, TN
December 30, 2023*; 12:00 p.m., SECN+		at Georgia	L 57–76	7–6	Stegeman Coliseum (2,406); Athens, GA
January 1, 2024*; 1:00 p.m., ESPN+		North Greenville	W 74–43	8–6	Jerry Richardson Indoor Stadium (534); Spartanburg, SC
SoCon regular season
January 11, 2024; 7:00 p.m., ESPN+		at UNC Greensboro	L 58–67	8–7 (0–1)	Fleming Gymnasium (515); Greensboro, NC
January 13, 2024; 2:00 p.m., ESPN+		at Western Carolina	W 75–56	9–7 (1–1)	Ramsey Center (582); Cullowhee, NC
January 20, 2024; 2:00 p.m., ESPN+		Furman	W 69–51	10–7 (2–1)	Jerry Richardson Indoor Stadium (1,049); Spartanburg, SC
January 25, 2024; 6:00 p.m., ESPN+		Mercer	W 65–64	11–7 (3–1)	Jerry Richardson Indoor Stadium (414); Spartanburg, SC
January 27, 2024; 2:00 p.m., ESPN+		Samford	W 59–41	12–7 (4–1)	Jerry Richardson Indoor Stadium (565); Spartanburg, SC
February 1, 2024; 7:00 p.m., ESPN+		at Chattanooga	L 51–57	12–8 (4–2)	McKenzie Arena (1,405); Chattanooga, TN
February 3, 2024; 1:30 p.m., ESPN+		at East Tennessee State	W 77–65	13–8 (5–2)	Brooks Gymnasium (3,615); Johnson City, TN
February 8, 2024; 11:00 a.m., ESPN+		Western Carolina	W 89–52	14–8 (6–2)	Jerry Richardson Indoor Stadium (1,507); Spartanburg, SC
February 10, 2024; 2:00 p.m., ESPN+		UNC Greensboro	W 66–60	15–8 (7–2)	Jerry Richardson Indoor Stadium (1,268); Spartanburg, SC
February 15, 2024; 7:00 p.m., ESPN+		at Furman	L 51–64	15–9 (7–3)	Timmons Arena (667); Greenville, SC
February 22, 2024; 7:00 p.m., ESPN+		at Samford	L 62–64	15–10 (7–4)	Pete Hanna Center (131); Homewood, AL
February 24, 2024; 2:00 p.m., ESPN+		at Mercer	L 74–79	15–11 (7–5)	Hawkins Arena (1,272); Macon, GA
February 29, 2024; 7:00 p.m., ESPN+		East Tennessee State	W 75–64	16–11 (8–5)	Jerry Richardson Indoor Stadium (574); Spartanburg, SC
March 2, 2024; 2:00 p.m., ESPN+		Chattanooga	L 67–84	16–12 (8–6)	Jerry Richardson Indoor Stadium (854); Spartanburg, SC
SoCon tournament
March 7, 2024; 3:30 p.m., ESPN+	(3)	vs. (6) Samford; Quarterfinals	W 66–45	17–12	Harrah's Cherokee Center (–); Asheville, NC
March 8, 2024; 1:15 p.m., ESPN+	(3)	vs. (2) UNC Greensboro; Semifinals	L 62–72	17–13	Harrah's Cherokee Center (–); Asheville, NC
*Non-conference game. ^{#}Rankings from AP poll. (#) Tournament seedings in parentheses. All times are in Eastern.
