= List of Clemson Tigers head basketball coaches =

List of Clemson Tigers head basketball coaches may refer to:

- List of Clemson Tigers men's basketball head coaches
- List of Clemson Tigers women's basketball head coaches
