= 2023–24 East Tennessee State Buccaneers women's basketball team =

American college basketball season

2023–24 East Tennessee State Buccaneers women's basketball
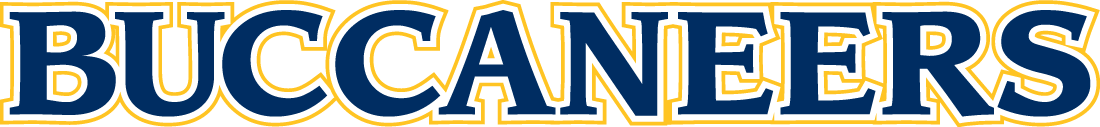
- Conference: Southern Conference
- Record: 18–12 (7–7 SoCon)
- Head coach: Brenda Mock Brown (2nd season)
- Assistant coaches: Honey Brown; Eric Gracia
- Home arena: Brooks Gymnasium

2023–24 Southern Conference women's basketball standings
	Conf.				Overall
Team	W		L	PCT	W		L	PCT
Chattanooga †	13	–	1	.929	28	–	5	.848
UNC Greensboro	8	–	6	.571	21	–	12	.636
Wofford	8	–	6	.571	17	–	13	.567
Mercer	8	–	6	.571	15	–	17	.469
East Tennessee State	7	–	7	.500	18	–	12	.600
Samford	6	–	8	.429	14	–	16	.467
Furman	5	–	9	.357	15	–	16	.484
Western Carolina	1	–	13	.071	6	–	24	.200
† 2024 SoCon tournament winner

The 2023–24 East Tennessee State Buccaneers women's basketball team represented East Tennessee State University during the 2023–24 NCAA Division I women's basketball season. The Buccaneers, who were led by second-year head coach Brenda Mock Brown, played their home games at Brooks Gymnasium in Johnson City, Tennessee as members of the Southern Conference (SoCon). They finished the season 18–12, 7–7 in SoCon play, to finish in fifth place.

== Previous season ==
The Buccaneers finished the 2022–23 season 26–10, 9–5 in SoCon play, to finish in a tie for second place. They defeated Samford in the quarterfinals of the SoCon tournament, before falling to eventual tournament champions Chattanooga in the semifinals. They received an invitation to the WBI, where they defeated FIU in the first round and lost to New Mexico State in the semifinals, before defeating Georgia Southern in the third-place game.

== Roster ==
2023–24 East Tennessee State Buccaneers women's basketball team
Players
Coaches

Pos.	#	Name	Height	Year	Previous school	Hometown
G	0	Nevaeh Brown	5 ft 9 in (1.75 m)	Jr	Northwest Florida State	Charlotte, NC
G	1	Lyndie Ramsey	5 ft 8 in (1.73 m)	Fr	Unaka High School	Elizabethton, TN
G	2	Journee McDaniel	5 ft 9 in (1.75 m)	So	Farmville Central High School	New Bern, NC
G	3	Brecken Snotherly	5 ft 9 in (1.75 m)	Fr	Eastern Randolph High School	Franklinville, NC
G	4	Meleah Kirtner	5 ft 10 in (1.78 m)	Jr	Wythe High School	Wytheville, VA
G	5	Jaileyah Cotton	5 ft 6 in (1.68 m)	So	Bardstown High School	Bardstown, KY
G	10	Courtney Moore	5 ft 7 in (1.7 m)	Sr	P. K. Yonge Developmental Research School	Gainesville, FL
G	11	Breanne Beatty	5 ft 8 in (1.73 m)	GS	Oakland	Worthington, OH
G	12	Kendall Folley	5 ft 7 in (1.7 m)	Jr	Oakland	Lebanon, OH
G	14	River Ruffus-Milner	5 ft 10 in (1.78 m)	GS	Pepperdine	North Hills, CA
F	15	Samiah Puckett	6 ft 3 in (1.91 m)	Fr	Griffin High School	Griffin, GA
F	20	Meghan Downing	6 ft 2 in (1.88 m)	So	Tri-Village High School	New Madison, OH
G	23	Sarah Thompson	5 ft 7 in (1.7 m)	Jr	Gate City High School	Gate City, VA
C	24	Jakhyia Davis	6 ft 3 in (1.91 m)	Sr	Bearden High School	Knoxville, TN

Head coach

- Brenda Mock Brown (Wake Forest)

Assistant coach(es)

- Honey Brown (Maryville)
- Eric Gracia (Texas–Pan American)

Legend

- (C) Team captain
- (S) Suspended
- (I) Ineligible
- (W) Walk-on
- Injured
- Current redshirt

Roster
Last update: May 30, 2024

== Schedule and results ==
Date time, TV	Rank^{#}	Opponent^{#}	Result	Record	Site (attendance) city, state
Non-conference regular season
November 7, 2023*; 7:00 p.m., SECN+		at Kentucky	L 66–74	0–1	Clive M. Beck Center (1,139); Lexington, KY
November 11, 2023*; 12:00 p.m., ESPN+		Lafayette	W 51–43	1–1	Brooks Gymnasium (527); Johnson City, TN
November 15, 2023*; 11:30 a.m., ESPN+		at Radford	W 49–45	2–1	Dedmon Center (3,000); Radford, VA
November 19, 2023*; 3:00 p.m., ESPN+		at Presbyterian	W 72–56	3–1	Templeton Physical Education Center (316); Clinton, SC
November 24, 2023*; 1:30 p.m.		vs. Norfolk State; Miami Thanksgiving Tournament	W 55–35	4–1	Watsco Center (2,169); Coral Gables, FL
November 26, 2023*; 1:30 p.m., ACCNX/FS2		at Miami (FL); Miami Thanksgiving Tournament	L 44–68	4–2	Watsco Center (2,038); Coral Gables, FL
November 30, 2023*; 7:00 p.m., ESPN+		Lipscomb	L 45–68	4–3	Brooks Gymnasium (473); Johnson City, TN
December 3, 2023*; 2:00 p.m., ESPN+		at Morehead State	W 56–52	5–3	Ellis Johnson Arena (1,050); Morehead, KY
December 6, 2023*; 6:00 p.m., ESPN+		Charleston Southern	W 79–52	6–3	Brooks Gymnasium (378); Johnson City, TN
December 10, 2023*; 1:30 p.m., ESPN+		Lees–McRae	W 77–42	7–3	Brooks Gymnasium (4,121); Johnson City, TN
December 14, 2023*; 7:00 p.m., ESPN+		UNC Asheville	W 60–51	8–3	Brooks Gymnasium (412); Johnson City, TN
December 17, 2023*; 2:00 p.m., ESPN+		Campbell	W 54–39	9–3	Brooks Gymnasium (683); Johnson City, TN
December 20, 2023*; 5:00 p.m., ESPN+		Gardner–Webb	W 60–48	10–3	Brooks Gymnasium (3,281); Johnson City, TN
December 22, 2023*; 2:00 p.m., ACCNX		at Clemson	L 50–73	10–4	Littlejohn Coliseum (890); Clemson, SC
December 30, 2023; 2:00 p.m., ESPN+		Coker	W 65–53	11–4	Brooks Gymnasium (522); Johnson City, TN
SoCon regular season
January 11, 2024; 7:00 p.m., ESPN+		Samford	W 57–40	12–4 (1–0)	Brooks Gymnasium (476); Johnson City, TN
January 13, 2024; 2:00 p.m., ESPN+		Mercer	W 77–71	13–4 (2–0)	Brooks Gymnasium (561); Johnson City, TN
January 20, 2024; 2:00 p.m., ESPN+		at Chattanooga	L 50–52	13–5 (2–1)	McKenzie Arena (1,849); Chattanooga, TN
January 25, 2024; 7:00 p.m., ESPN+		at Western Carolina	W 56–47	14–5 (3–1)	Ramsey Center (558); Cullowhee, NC
January 27, 2024; 1:00 p.m., ESPN+		at UNC Greensboro	L 50–54	14–6 (3–2)	Fleming Gymnasium (498); Greensboro, NC
February 1, 2024; 7:00 p.m., ESPN+		Furman	W 78–59	15–6 (4–2)	Brooks Gymnasium (659); Johnson City, TN
February 3, 2024; 1:30 p.m., ESPN+		Wofford	L 65–77	15–7 (4–3)	Brooks Gymnasium (3,615); Johnson City, TN
February 8, 2024; 7:00 p.m., ESPN+		at Mercer	L 57–65	15–8 (4–4)	Hawkins Arena (618); Macon, GA
February 10, 2024; 3:00 p.m., ESPN+		at Samford	W 69–56	16–8 (5–4)	Pete Hanna Center (379); Homewood, AL
February 17, 2024; 2:00 p.m., ESPN+		Chattanooga	L 41–56	16–9 (5–5)	Brooks Gymnasium (817); Johnson City, TN
February 22, 2024; 7:00 p.m., ESPN+		UNC Greensboro	W 54–51	17–9 (6–5)	Brooks Gymnasium (411); Johnson City, TN
February 24, 2024; 2:00 p.m., ESPN+		Western Carolina	W 71–33	18–9 (7–5)	Brooks Gymnasium (1,052); Johnson City, TN
February 29, 2024; 7:00 p.m., ESPN+		at Wofford	L 64–75	18–10 (7–6)	Jerry Richardson Indoor Stadium (574); Spartanburg, SC
March 2, 2024; 6:00 p.m., ESPN+		at Furman	L 59–67	18–11 (7–7)	Timmons Arena (417); Greenville, SC
SoCon tournament
March 7, 2024; 5:45 p.m., ESPN+	(5)	vs. (4) Mercer; Quarterfinals	L 52–67	18–12	Harrah's Cherokee Center (3,029); Asheville, NC
*Non-conference game. ^{#}Rankings from AP poll. (#) Tournament seedings in parentheses. All times are in Eastern.
