= 2023–24 Furman Paladins women's basketball team =

American college basketball season

2023–24 Furman Paladins women's basketball
- Conference: Southern Conference
- Record: 15–16 (5–9 SoCon)
- Head coach: Pierre Curtis (1st season)
- Assistant coaches: Ashley Johnson; Amber Reeves; Lauren Johnson
- Home arena: Timmons Arena

2023–24 Southern Conference women's basketball standings
	Conf.				Overall
Team	W		L	PCT	W		L	PCT
Chattanooga †	13	–	1	.929	28	–	5	.848
UNC Greensboro	8	–	6	.571	21	–	12	.636
Wofford	8	–	6	.571	17	–	13	.567
Mercer	8	–	6	.571	15	–	17	.469
East Tennessee State	7	–	7	.500	18	–	12	.600
Samford	6	–	8	.429	14	–	16	.467
Furman	5	–	9	.357	15	–	16	.484
Western Carolina	1	–	13	.071	6	–	24	.200
† 2024 SoCon tournament winner

The 2023–24 Furman Paladins women's basketball team represented Furman University during the 2023–24 NCAA Division I women's basketball season. The Paladins, who were led by first-year head coach Pierre Curtis, played their home games at Timmons Arena in Greenville, South Carolina as members of the Southern Conference (SoCon).

== Previous season ==
The Paladins finished the 2022–23 season 11–19, 3–11 in SoCon play, to finish in seventh place. They were defeated by eventual tournament champions Chattanooga in the quarterfinals of the SoCon tournament.

On June 8, 2023, it was announced that head coach Jackie Carson would be leaving the program, in order to take the job of the ACC's senior associate commissioner for women's basketball. Two days later, on June 10, the school announced that associate head coach Pierre Curtis would be elevated to head coach, becoming the eighth head coach in the program's history.

== Roster ==
2023–24 Furman Paladins women's basketball team
Players
Coaches

Pos.	#	Name	Height	Year	Previous school	Hometown
G	0	Jayda Pinder	5 ft 7 in (1.7 m)	Fr	Academy of the Holy Names	Tampa, FL
G	1	Evie DePetro	5 ft 9 in (1.75 m)	Sr	Carter High School	Knoxville, TN
F	3	Jada Session	6 ft 1 in (1.85 m)	Jr	Luella High School	Locust Grove, GA
G	4	Tate Walters	5 ft 9 in (1.75 m)	RS Jr	Buford High School	Buford, GA
G	10	Kennedy Grier	5 ft 4 in (1.63 m)	Sr	Charlotte Country Day School	Charlotte, NC
G	11	Ella Riggs	5 ft 9 in (1.75 m)	So	Indian Hill High School	Cincinnati, OH
G	12	Asa Snyder	5 ft 7 in (1.7 m)	Fr	Porter-Gaud School	Charleston, SC
G	13	Paraskevi Koilia	5 ft 8 in (1.73 m)	Sr	Moraitis School	Athens, Greece
F	14	Hanna Hansson	6 ft 4 in (1.93 m)	RS Fr	Riksidrottsgymnasiet Lulea	Stockholm, Sweden
G	20	Sydney Ryan	5 ft 11 in (1.8 m)	So	Brentwood High School	Nashville, TN
G	21	Niveya Henley	6 ft 0 in (1.83 m)	RS So	Montverde Academy	Seattle, WA
G	24	Jaelyn Acker	5 ft 7 in (1.7 m)	RS So	Germantown High School	Richfield, WI
G	30	Nia Johnson	5 ft 8 in (1.73 m)	GS	New Mexico	Sacramento, CA
G/F	35	Sydney James	6 ft 0 in (1.83 m)	Sr	West Port High School	Ocala, FL
F	42	Kate Johnson	6 ft 3 in (1.91 m)	Jr	Cherokee High School	Canton, GA

Head coach

- Pierre Curtis (James Madison)

Assistant coach(es)

- Ashley Johnson (LSU)
- Amber Reeves (UNC Wilmington)
- Lauren Johnson (Southern Wesleyan)

Legend

- (C) Team captain
- (S) Suspended
- (I) Ineligible
- (W) Walk-on
- Injured
- Current redshirt

Roster
Last update: May 31, 2024

== Schedule and results ==
Date time, TV	Rank^{#}	Opponent^{#}	Result	Record	Site (attendance) city, state
Non-conference regular season
November 7, 2023*; 7:00 p.m., ESPN+		UNC Asheville	W 71–61	1–0	Timmons Arena (577); Greenville, SC
November 11, 2023*; 2:00 p.m., ACCNX		at Georgia Tech	L 56–91	1–1	McCamish Pavilion (1,538); Atlanta, GA
November 14, 2023*; 6:00 p.m., ESPN+		at Charleston Southern	W 71–68	2–1	Buccaneer Field House (208); North Charleston, SC
November 18, 2023*; 2:00 p.m., ESPN+		Coastal Carolina	L 72–78	2–2	Timmons Arena (227); Greenville, SC
November 20, 2023*; 7:00 p.m., ESPN+		Southern Wesleyan	W 96–62	3–2	Timmons Arena (158); Greenville, SC
November 23, 2023*; 1:30 p.m.		vs. Appalachian State; Puerto Rico Thanksgiving Basketball Clasico	L 63–68	3–3	Coliseo Rubén Rodríguez (100); Bayamón, Puerto Rico
November 25, 2023*; 1:30 p.m.		vs. Binghamton; Puerto Rico Thanksgiving Basketball Clasico	W 74–72	4–3	Coliseo Rubén Rodríguez (100); Bayamón, Puerto Rico
November 29, 2023*; 7:00 p.m., ESPN+		at Gardner–Webb	W 73–66	5–3	Paul Porter Arena (150); Boiling Springs, NC
December 3, 2023*; 2:00 p.m., SECN+		at Georgia	L 55–85	5–4	Stegeman Coliseum (2,944); Athens, GA
December 6, 2023*; 7:00 p.m., ESPN+		Bob Jones	W 124–44	6–4	Timmons Arena (301); Greenville, SC
December 9, 2023*; 4:30 p.m., ESPN+		at USC Upstate	L 58–61	6–5	G. B. Hodge Center (259); Spartanburg, SC
December 14, 2023*; 7:00 p.m., ESPN+		Elon	W 73–47	7–5	Timmons Arena (518); Greenville, SC
December 17, 2023*; 1:00 p.m., SECN+		at Kentucky	L 45–75	7–6	Rupp Arena (3,287); Lexington, KY
December 21, 2023*; 7:00 p.m., ESPN+		South Carolina State	W 67–43	8–6	Timmons Arena (502); Greenville, SC
December 31, 2023*; 1:00 p.m., ESPN+		North Carolina Central	W 73–63	9–6	Timmons Arena (366); Greenville, SC
January 7, 2024*; 2:00 p.m., ESPN+		Converse	W 93–40	10–6	Timmons Arena (832); Greenville, SC
SoCon regular season
January 11, 2024; 7:00 p.m., ESPN+		at Western Carolina	W 84–69	11–6 (1–0)	Ramsey Center (526); Cullowhee, NC
January 13, 2024; 2:00 p.m., ESPN+		at UNC Greensboro	L 55–70	11–7 (1–1)	Fleming Gymnasium (321); Greensboro, NC
January 20, 2024; 2:00 p.m., ESPN+		at Wofford	L 51–69	11–8 (1–2)	Jerry Richardson Indoor Stadium (1,049); Spartanburg, SC
January 25, 2024; 7:00 p.m., ESPN+		Samford	L 60–66	11–9 (1–3)	Timmons Arena (342); Greenville, SC
January 27, 2024; 2:00 p.m., ESPN+		Mercer	W 58–56	12–9 (2–3)	Timmons Arena (518); Greenville, SC
February 1, 2024; 7:00 p.m., ESPN+		at East Tennessee State	L 59–78	12–10 (2–4)	Brooks Gymnasium (659); Johnson City, TN
February 3, 2024; 2:00 p.m., ESPN+		at Chattanooga	L 62–79	12–11 (2–5)	McKenzie Arena (–); Chattanooga, TN
February 8, 2024; 7:00 p.m., ESPN+		UNC Greensboro	L 56–59	12–12 (2–6)	Timmons Arena (357); Greenville, SC
February 11, 2024; 2:00 p.m., ESPN+		Western Carolina	W 58–53	13–12 (3–6)	Timmons Arena (358); Greenville, SC
February 15, 2024; 7:00 p.m., ESPN+		Wofford	W 64–51	14–12 (4–6)	Timmons Arena (667); Greenville, SC
February 22, 2024; 7:00 p.m., ESPN+		at Mercer	L 50–55	14–13 (4–7)	Hawkins Arena (473); Macon, GA
February 24, 2024; 5:30 p.m., ESPN+		at Samford	L 66–74	14–14 (4–8)	Pete Hanna Center (423); Homewood, AL
February 29, 2024; 7:00 p.m., ESPN+		Chattanooga	L 53–60	14–15 (4–9)	Timmons Arena (344); Greenville, SC
March 2, 2024; 6:00 p.m., ESPN+		East Tennessee State	W 67–59	15–15 (5–9)	Timmons Arena (417); Greenville, SC
SoCon tournament
March 7, 2024; 1:15 p.m., ESPN+	(7)	vs. (2) UNC Greensboro; Quarterfinals	L 44–64	15–16	Harrah's Cherokee Center (–); Asheville, NC
*Non-conference game. ^{#}Rankings from AP poll. (#) Tournament seedings in parentheses. All times are in Eastern.
