= 2023–24 UNC Greensboro Spartans women's basketball team =

American college basketball season

2023–24 UNC Greensboro Spartans women's basketball
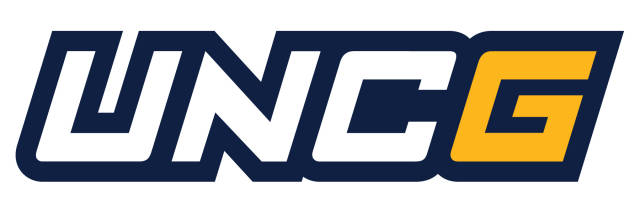

WNIT, first round
- Conference: Southern Conference
- Record: 21–12 (8–6 SoCon)
- Head coach: Trina Patterson (8th season)
- Associate head coach: Cetera DeGraffenreid
- Assistant coaches: Alex Miller; Fred Applin; Abby Vampatella; Letoya McBride
- Home arena: Fleming Gymnasium

2023–24 Southern Conference women's basketball standings
	Conf.				Overall
Team	W		L	PCT	W		L	PCT
Chattanooga †	13	–	1	.929	28	–	5	.848
UNC Greensboro	8	–	6	.571	21	–	12	.636
Wofford	8	–	6	.571	17	–	13	.567
Mercer	8	–	6	.571	15	–	17	.469
East Tennessee State	7	–	7	.500	18	–	12	.600
Samford	6	–	8	.429	14	–	16	.467
Furman	5	–	9	.357	15	–	16	.484
Western Carolina	1	–	13	.071	6	–	24	.200
† 2024 SoCon tournament winner

The 2023–24 UNC Greensboro Spartans women's basketball team represented the University of North Carolina at Greensboro during the 2023–24 NCAA Division I women's basketball season. The Spartans, who were led by eighth-year head coach Trina Patterson, played their home games at Fleming Gymnasium in Greensboro, North Carolina, with one game at the Greensboro Coliseum, as members of the Southern Conference (SoCon).

They finished the season 21–12, 8–6 in SoCon play, to finish in a three-way tie for second place. As a No. 2 seed in the SoCon tournament, the Spartans defeated Furman in the quarterfinals and Wofford in the semifinals before losing to Chattanooga in the championship game. They received an automatic bid to the WNIT, where they lost in the first round to North Carolina A&T.

== Previous season ==
The Spartans finished the 2022–23 season 16–14, 8–6 in SoCon play, to finish in a tie for fourth place. They defeated Mercer in the quarterfinals of the SoCon tournament before falling to top-seeded Wofford in the semifinals.

== Roster ==
2023–24 UNC Greensboro Spartans women's basketball team
Players
Coaches

Pos.	#	Name	Height	Year	Previous school	Hometown
G	0	Kelly Boyle	5 ft 6 in (1.68 m)	Fr	Hopkins High School	Maple Grove, MN
G	1	Jayde Gamble	5 ft 6 in (1.68 m)	Jr	UNC Wilmington	Holly Springs, NC
F	2	Antoniette Emma-Nnopu	5 ft 11 in (1.8 m)	So	Geelong College	Geelong, Australia
G	3	Nasia Powell	5 ft 7 in (1.7 m)	Jr	Vanguard High School	Ocala, FL
F	5	Yacine N'Diaye	6 ft 4 in (1.93 m)	Fr	Life Christian Academy	Pout, Senegal
G	13	Joelle Davis	5 ft 10 in (1.78 m)	Fr	Durham Academy	Durham, NC
G/F	14	Kennedy Simpson	6 ft 2 in (1.88 m)	Jr	Mallard Creek High School	Charlotte, NC
F	15	Khalis Cain	6 ft 3 in (1.91 m)	Sr	Mount Zion Christian Academy	San Jose, CA
G	21	Makiah Asidanya	5 ft 7 in (1.7 m)	Fr	Salesian College Preparatory	Martinez, CA
G/F	22	Isys Grady	5 ft 11 in (1.8 m)	Jr	Mainland High School	Ormond Beach, FL
G	23	Jailah Clark-Jones	5 ft 11 in (1.8 m)	Jr	Collins Hill High School	Birmingham, AL
G	30	Nina Horvath	5 ft 8 in (1.73 m)	Fr	Theo-Koch-Schule-Grünberg	Oberwart, Austria
G	35	Ayanna Khalfani	5 ft 11 in (1.8 m)	GS	San Diego	Los Angeles, CA
G	44	Nia Howard	5 ft 8 in (1.73 m)	Jr	Jordan High School	Durham, NC
F	45	Jay'lin Hastings	6 ft 1 in (1.85 m)	Sr	DeLand High School	DeLand, FL

Head coach

- Trina Patterson (Virginia)

Assistant coach(es)

- Cetera DeGraffenreid (North Carolina)
- Alex Miller (North Carolina)
- Fred Applin (Elon)
- Abby Vampatella (Gordon)
- Letoya McBride (Gardner–Webb)

Legend

- (C) Team captain
- (S) Suspended
- (I) Ineligible
- (W) Walk-on
- Injured
- Current redshirt

Roster
Last update: May 28, 2024

== Schedule and results ==
Date time, TV	Rank^{#}	Opponent^{#}	Result	Record	Site (attendance) city, state
Non-conference regular season
November 6, 2023*; 6:30 p.m., ESPN+		at Appalachian State	L 65–71	0–1	Holmes Center (669); Boone, NC
November 11, 2023*; 12:00 p.m., ESPN+		South Carolina State	W 61–30	1–1	Fleming Gymnasium (359); Greensboro, NC
November 14, 2023*; 11:00 a.m., ESPN+		Pfeiffer	W 93–25	2–1	Fleming Gymnasium (1,203); Greensboro, NC
November 18, 2023*; 2:00 p.m., ESPN+		at Radford	W 63–60	3–1	Dedmon Center (653); Radford, VA
November 20, 2023*; 6:00 p.m., ACCNX		at No. 9 Virginia Tech	L 51–72	3–2	Cassell Coliseum (4,154); Blacksburg, VA
November 22, 2023*; 5:00 p.m., ESPN+		Montreat	W 75–46	4–2	Fleming Gymnasium (232); Greensboro, NC
November 26, 2023*; 2:00 p.m., ESPN+		Gardner–Webb	W 64–47	5–2	Fleming Gymnasium (186); Greensboro, NC
November 29, 2023*; 7:00 p.m., ESPN+		Coastal Carolina	W 65–59	6–2	Fleming Gymnasium (302); Greensboro, NC
December 6, 2023*; 7:00 p.m., ACCNX		at No. 24 North Carolina	L 66–81	6–3	Carmichael Arena (2,066); Chapel Hill, NC
December 10, 2023*; 2:00 p.m., ESPN+		Elon	W 52–47	7–3	Greensboro Coliseum (317); Greensboro, NC
December 14, 2023*; 7:00 p.m., ESPN+		North Carolina Central	W 66–55	8–3	Fleming Gymnasium (252); Greensboro, NC
December 18, 2023*; 11:00 a.m., ESPN+		at USC Upstate	W 56–53	9–3	G. B. Hodge Center (818); Spartanburg, SC
December 21, 2023*; 2:00 p.m., ESPN+		at UNC Asheville	L 71–72	9–4	Kimmel Arena (217); Asheville, NC
December 29, 2023*; 7:00 p.m., ESPN+		Converse	W 78–33	10–4	Fleming Gymnasium (188); Greensboro, NC
January 4, 2024*; 7:00 p.m., ESPN+		Livingstone	W 78–32	11–4	Fleming Gymnasium (150); Greensboro, NC
SoCon regular season
January 11, 2024; 7:00 p.m., ESPN+		Wofford	W 67–58	12–4 (1–0)	Fleming Gymnasium (515); Greensboro, NC
January 13, 2024; 2:00 p.m., ESPN+		Furman	W 70–55	13–4 (2–0)	Fleming Gymnasium (321); Greensboro, NC
January 18, 2024; 7:00 p.m., ESPN+		at Mercer	L 52–76	13–5 (2–1)	Hawkins Arena (753); Macon, GA
January 20, 2024; 3:00 p.m., ESPN+		at Samford	L 53–62	13–6 (2–2)	Pete Hanna Center (336); Homewood, AL
January 25, 2024; 7:00 p.m., ESPN+		Chattanooga	L 55–73	13–7 (2–3)	Fleming Gymnasium (406); Greensboro, NC
January 27, 2024; 1:00 p.m., ESPN+		East Tennessee State	W 54–50	14–7 (3–3)	Fleming Gymnasium (498); Greensboro, NC
February 3, 2024; 2:00 p.m., ESPN+		at Western Carolina	L 71–78	14–8 (3–4)	Ramsey Center (565); Cullowhee, NC
February 8, 2024; 7:00 p.m., ESPN+		at Furman	W 59–56	15–8 (4–4)	Timmons Arena (357); Greenville, SC
February 10, 2024; 2:00 p.m., ESPN+		at Wofford	L 60–66	15–9 (4–5)	Jerry Richardson Indoor Stadium (1,268); Spartanburg, SC
February 15, 2024; 7:00 p.m., ESPN+		Samford	W 52–44	16–9 (5–5)	Fleming Gymnasium (528); Greensboro, NC
February 17, 2024; 2:00 p.m., ESPN+		Mercer	W 69–49	17–9 (6–5)	Fleming Gymnasium (396); Greensboro, NC
February 22, 2024; 7:00 p.m., ESPN+		at East Tennessee State	L 51–54	17–9 (6–5)	Brooks Gymnasium (411); Johnson City, TN
February 24, 2024; 2:00 p.m., ESPN+		at Chattanooga	W 68–64	18–10 (7–6)	McKenzie Arena (1,783); Chattanooga, TN
March 2, 2024; 2:00 p.m., ESPN+		Western Carolina	W 61–54	19–10 (8–6)	Fleming Gymnasium (452); Greensboro, NC
SoCon tournament
March 7, 2024; 1:15 p.m., ESPN+	(2)	vs. (7) Furman; Quarterfinals	W 64–44	20–10	Harrah's Cherokee Center (–); Asheville, NC
March 8, 2024; 1:15 p.m., ESPN+	(2)	vs. (3) Wofford; Semifinals	W 72–62	21–10	Harrah's Cherokee Center (–); Asheville, NC
March 10, 2024; 12:00 p.m., ESPNU/ESPN+	(2)	vs. (1) Chattanooga; Championship	L 60–69	21–11	Harrah's Cherokee Center (–); Asheville, NC
WNIT
March 22, 2024; 7:00 p.m.		at North Carolina A&T; First round	L 51–56	21–12	Corbett Sports Center (3,909); Greensboro, NC
*Non-conference game. ^{#}Rankings from AP poll. (#) Tournament seedings in parentheses. All times are in Eastern.
