= 2023–24 Samford Bulldogs women's basketball team =

American college basketball season

2023–24 Samford Bulldogs women's basketball
- Conference: Southern Conference
- Record: 14–16 (6–8 SoCon)
- Head coach: Carley Kuhns (5th season)
- Assistant coaches: Sally Higgins; Matt Wise; Charity Brown
- Home arena: Pete Hanna Center

2023–24 Southern Conference women's basketball standings
	Conf.				Overall
Team	W		L	PCT	W		L	PCT
Chattanooga †	13	–	1	.929	28	–	5	.848
UNC Greensboro	8	–	6	.571	21	–	12	.636
Wofford	8	–	6	.571	17	–	13	.567
Mercer	8	–	6	.571	15	–	17	.469
East Tennessee State	7	–	7	.500	18	–	12	.600
Samford	6	–	8	.429	14	–	16	.467
Furman	5	–	9	.357	15	–	16	.484
Western Carolina	1	–	13	.071	6	–	24	.200
† 2024 SoCon tournament winner

The 2023–24 Samford Bulldogs women's basketball team represented Samford University during the 2023–24 NCAA Division I women's basketball season. The Bulldogs, who were led by fifth-year head coach Carley Kuhns, played their home games at the Pete Hanna Center in Homewood, Alabama as members of the Southern Conference (SoCon).

== Previous season ==
The Bulldogs finished the 2022–23 season 13–17, 7–7 in SoCon play, to finish in sixth place. They were defeated by East Tennessee State in the quarterfinals of the SoCon tournament.

== Roster ==
2023–24 Samford Bulldogs women's basketball team
Players
Coaches

Pos.	#	Name	Height	Year	Previous school	Hometown
G	1	Lexie Pritchard	5 ft 10 in (1.78 m)	GS	Santa Clara	West Linn, OR
G	2	Jada Knight	5 ft 7 in (1.7 m)	Jr	Butler Community College	Hoover, AL
G	3	Masyn Marchbanks	5 ft 8 in (1.73 m)	So	Hartselle High School	Hartselle, AL
G	4	Kennedy Langham	5 ft 7 in (1.7 m)	Fr	Sparkman High School	Harvest, AL
G	5	Carly Heidger	6 ft 3 in (1.91 m)	RS So	Hebron Christian Academy	Dacula, GA
G/F	10	Aubrey Blankenship	6 ft 0 in (1.83 m)	Fr	Green Hill High School	Mount Juliet, TN
G	11	Alonya Waldon	5 ft 5 in (1.65 m)	Fr	Palm Bay High School	Melbourne, FL
G	12	Sadie Stetson	5 ft 7 in (1.7 m)	GS	American	Waterford, VT
G	20	Alyssa Tarpley	5 ft 10 in (1.78 m)	So	Gunter High School	Gunter, TX
F	32	Kiersten Nelson	6 ft 1 in (1.85 m)	Jr	Ursuline Academy	New Orleans, LA
G	33	Rylie Stephens	5 ft 11 in (1.8 m)	Sr	Evansville	Fairland, IN
F	35	Alexis Woods	6 ft 1 in (1.85 m)	GS	Alabama–Huntsville	Athens, GA
C	44	Emily Bowman	6 ft 5 in (1.96 m)	RS So	Vanderbilt	Huntsville, AL

Head coach

- Carley Kuhns (Valdosta State)

Assistant coach(es)

- Sally Higgins (West Texas A&M)
- Matt Wise (Transylvania)
- Charity Brown (Samford)

Legend

- (C) Team captain
- (S) Suspended
- (I) Ineligible
- (W) Walk-on
- Injured
- Current redshirt

Roster
Last update: May 31, 2024

== Schedule and results ==
Date time, TV	Rank^{#}	Opponent^{#}	Result	Record	Site (attendance) city, state
Non-conference regular season
November 6, 2023*; 11:00 a.m., ESPN+		Auburn Montgomery	W 78–51	1–0	Pete Hanna Center (1,621); Homewood, AL
November 11, 2023*; 2:00 p.m., ESPN+		Central Arkansas	W 65–62	2–0	Pete Hanna Center (306); Homewood, AL
November 14, 2023*; 5:15 p.m., ESPN+		at Troy	W 65–61	3–0	Trojan Arena (1,721); Troy, AL
November 18, 2023*; 5:00 p.m., ESPN+		Alabama State	W 69–47	4–0	Pete Hanna Center (303); Homewood, AL
November 24, 2023*; 1:00 p.m., ESPN+		vs. North Texas; Lady Eagle Thanksgiving Classic	L 59–71	4–1	Reed Green Coliseum (1,366); Hattiesburg, MS
November 25, 2023*; 4:00 p.m., ESPN+		at Southern Miss; Lady Eagle Thanksgiving Classic	L 33–51	4–2	Reed Green Coliseum (1,489); Hattiesburg, MS
November 30, 2023*; 4:30 p.m., ESPN+		USC Upstate	W 57–52	5–2	Pete Hanna Center (471); Homewood, AL
December 3, 2023*; 1:00 p.m., ESPN+		Jacksonville State	W 65–51	6–2	Pete Hanna Center (339); Homewood, AL
December 10, 2023*; 2:00 p.m., SECN+		at Alabama	L 39–69	6–3	Coleman Coliseum (2,135); Tuscaloosa, AL
December 13, 2023*; 6:00 p.m., ESPN+		LaGrange	W 76–50	7–3	Pete Hanna Center (264); Homewood, AL
December 16, 2023*; 12:30 p.m., SECN+		vs. Arkansas	L 54–68	7–4	Simmons Bank Arena (2,513); North Little Rock, AR
December 19, 2023*; 1:00 p.m., ESPN+		North Alabama	L 64–69	7–5	Pete Hanna Center (376); Homewood, AL
December 29, 2023*; 6:00 p.m., ESPN+		at Eastern Kentucky	L 54–59	7–6	Baptist Health Arena (458); Richmond, KY
December 31, 2023*; 12:00 p.m., SECN+		at Kentucky	L 59–72	7–7	Clive M. Beck Center (1,010); Lexington, KY
January 5, 2024*; 6:00 p.m., ESPN+		Cumberland	W 74–50	8–7	Pete Hanna Center (220); Homewood, AL
SoCon regular season
January 11, 2024; 6:00 p.m., ESPN+		at East Tennessee State	L 40–57	8–8 (0–1)	Brooks Gymnasium (476); Johnson City, TN
January 13, 2024; 1:00 p.m., ESPN+		at Chattanooga	L 52–75	8–9 (0–2)	McKenzie Arena (1,394); Chattanooga, TN
January 18, 2024; 6:00 p.m., ESPN+		Western Carolina	W 48–47	9–9 (1–2)	Pete Hanna Center (133); Homewood, AL
January 20, 2024; 2:00 p.m., ESPN+		UNC Greensboro	W 62–53	10–9 (2–2)	Pete Hanna Center (336); Homewood, AL
January 25, 2024; 6:00 p.m., ESPN+		at Furman	W 66–60	11–9 (3–2)	Timmons Arena (342); Greenville, SC
January 27, 2024; 1:00 p.m., ESPN+		at Wofford	L 41–59	11–10 (3–3)	Jerry Richardson Indoor Stadium (565); Spartanburg, SC
February 3, 2024; 2:00 p.m., ESPN+		Mercer	L 59–87	11–11 (3–4)	Pete Hanna Center (312); Homewood, AL
February 8, 2024; 6:00 p.m., ESPN+		Chattanooga	L 39–55	11–12 (3–5)	Pete Hanna Center (723); Homewood, AL
February 10, 2024; 2:00 p.m., ESPN+		East Tennessee State	L 56–69	11–13 (3–6)	Pete Hanna Center (379); Homewood, AL
February 15, 2024; 6:00 p.m., ESPN+		at UNC Greensboro	L 44–52	11–14 (3–7)	Fleming Gymnasium (528); Greensboro, NC
February 17, 2024; 6:00 p.m., ESPN+		at Western Carolina	W 72–57	12–14 (4–7)	Ramsey Center (689); Cullowhee, NC
February 22, 2024; 6:00 p.m., ESPN+		Wofford	W 64–62	13–14 (5–7)	Pete Hanna Center (131); Homewood, AL
February 24, 2024; 4:30 p.m., ESPN+		Furman	W 74–66	14–14 (6–7)	Pete Hanna Center (423); Homewood, AL
March 2, 2024; 1:00 p.m., ESPN+		at Mercer	L 69–76	14–15 (6–8)	Hawkins Arena (1,072); Macon, GA
SoCon tournament
March 7, 2024; 2:30 p.m., ESPN+	(6)	vs. (3) Wofford; Quarterfinals	L 45–66	14–16	Harrah's Cherokee Center (–); Asheville, NC
*Non-conference game. ^{#}Rankings from AP poll. (#) Tournament seedings in parentheses. All times are in Central.
