= 2023–24 Mercer Bears women's basketball team =

American college basketball season

2023–24 Mercer Bears women's basketball
- Conference: Southern Conference
- Record: 15–17 (8–6 SoCon)
- Head coach: Susie Gardner (14th season)
- Assistant coaches: Jocelyn Brown; Lindsay Hieronymus; Jordan Walker; Ali Trani
- Home arena: Hawkins Arena

2023–24 Southern Conference women's basketball standings
| | Conf. | | | | Overall |
| Team | W | | L | PCT | W | | L | PCT |
|---|---|---|---|---|---|---|---|---|
| Chattanooga † | 13 | – | 1 | .929 | 28 | – | 5 | .848 |
| UNC Greensboro | 8 | – | 6 | .571 | 21 | – | 12 | .636 |
| Wofford | 8 | – | 6 | .571 | 17 | – | 13 | .567 |
| Mercer | 8 | – | 6 | .571 | 15 | – | 17 | .469 |
| East Tennessee State | 7 | – | 7 | .500 | 18 | – | 12 | .600 |
| Samford | 6 | – | 8 | .429 | 14 | – | 16 | .467 |
| Furman | 5 | – | 9 | .357 | 15 | – | 16 | .484 |
| Western Carolina | 1 | – | 13 | .071 | 6 | – | 24 | .200 |
† 2024 SoCon tournament winner

The 2023–24 Mercer Bears women's basketball team represented Mercer University during the 2023–24 NCAA Division I women's basketball season. The Bears, who were led by 14th-year head coach Susie Gardner, played their home games at Hawkins Arena in Macon, Georgia as members of the Southern Conference (SoCon).

The Bears finished the season 15–17, 8–6 in SoCon play, to finish in a three-way tie for second place. They defeated East Tennessee State before falling to top-seeded and eventual tournament champions Chattanooga in the semifinals of the SoCon tournament.

On March 9, 2024, head coach Susie Gardner announced her resignation, ending her 14-year tenure with the team. On March 23, the school announced that they would be hiring Mississippi State assistant and former Cincinnati head coach Michelle Clark-Heard as Gardner's successor.

== Previous season ==
The Bears finished the 2022–23 season 12–16, 8–6 in SoCon play, to finish in a tie for fourth place. They were defeated by UNC Greensboro in the quarterfinals of the SoCon tournament.

== Roster ==
2023–24 Mercer Bears women's basketball team
Players
Coaches

| Pos. | # | Name | Height | Year | Previous school | Hometown |
|---|---|---|---|---|---|---|
| F | 0 | Mackenzie Johnson | 6 ft 1 in (1.85 m) | GS | Young Harris | Chattanooga, Tennessee |
| F | 1 | Ariana Dyson | 6 ft 1 in (1.85 m) | Fr | Luella High School | Griffin, GA |
| G | 2 | Maria Serracanta | 6 ft 0 in (1.83 m) | So | Escola Sant Nicolau | Sabadell, Spain |
| G | 4 | Hanna Knoll | 5 ft 8 in (1.73 m) | RS So | Central Michigan | Angola, IN |
| G | 5 | Deja Williams | 5 ft 6 in (1.68 m) | GS | Cleveland State | Long Beach, CA |
| G | 11 | Enjulina Gonzalez | 5 ft 9 in (1.75 m) | So | Miami Christian School | Miami, Florida |
| G | 12 | Cianté Downs | 5 ft 8 in (1.73 m) | Jr | Gulf Coast State | Vaughan, ON |
| G | 15 | Aspen Johnson | 5 ft 11 in (1.8 m) | So | Seminole Ridge High School | Wellington, FL |
| F | 20 | Stacie Jones | 6 ft 1 in (1.85 m) | Sr | Kennesaw State | Kathleen, GA |
| F | 23 | Ashlee Locke | 6 ft 3 in (1.91 m) | Jr | Flowery Branch High School | Flowery Branch, GA |
| G | 24 | Briana Peguero | 5 ft 7 in (1.7 m) | Jr | Trinity Valley Community College | Houston, TX |
| F | 33 | Summah Evans | 6 ft 0 in (1.83 m) | Sr | North Florida | Cairns, Australia |

Head coach

- Susie Gardner (Georgia)

Assistant coach(es)

- Jocelyn Brown (Appalachian State)
- Lindsay Hieronymus (Transylvania)
- Jordan Walker (Tennessee)
- Ali Trani (UNC Asheville)

Legend

- (C) Team captain
- (S) Suspended
- (I) Ineligible
- (W) Walk-on
- Injured
- Current redshirt

Roster
Last update: May 30, 2024

== Schedule and results ==
| Date time, TV | Rank^{#} | Opponent^{#} | Result | Record | Site (attendance) city, state |
Non-conference regular season
| November 6, 2023*; 6:00 p.m., ESPN+ | | at Western Kentucky | L 64–70 | 0–1 | E. A. Diddle Arena (1,387); Bowling Green, KY |
| November 9, 2023*; 7:30 p.m., ESPN+ | | Florida Atlantic | W 70–62 | 1–1 | Hawkins Arena (934); Macon, GA |
| November 12, 2023*; 2:00 p.m., ACCNX | | at Clemson | L 66–90 | 1–2 | Littlejohn Coliseum (822); Clemson, SC |
| November 16, 2023*; 7:00 p.m., ESPN+ | | Georgia | L 57–77 | 1–3 | Hawkins Arena (2,372); Macon, GA |
| November 19, 2023*; 2:00 p.m., ESPN+ | | Tulane | L 58–64 | 1–4 | Hawkins Arena (607); Macon, GA |
| November 22, 2023*; 12:00 p.m. | | vs. Bowling Green; Savannah Hoops Invitational | L 38–59 | 1–5 | Enmarket Arena (123); Savannah, GA |
| November 23, 2023*; 11:30 a.m. | | vs. Marist; Savannah Hoops Invitational | W 73–67 ^{OT} | 2–5 | Enmarket Arena (84); Savannah, GA |
| November 25, 2023*; 2:00 p.m., ESPN+ | | at Charleston Southern | L 53–66 | 2–6 | Buccaneer Field House (102); North Charleston, SC |
| November 29, 2023*; 5:30 p.m., ESPN+ | | at Charlotte | L 58–65 | 2–7 | Dale F. Halton Arena (733); Charlotte, NC |
| December 2, 2023*; 2:00 p.m., ESPN+ | | Austin Peay | W 78–75 ^{2OT} | 3–7 | Hawkins Arena (574); Macon, GA |
| December 5, 2023*; 7:00 p.m., ACCNX | | at Georgia Tech | L 60–73 | 3–8 | McCamish Pavilion (1,353); Atlanta, GA |
| December 9, 2023*; 2:00 p.m., FloHoops | | at North Carolina A&T | W 55–52 | 4–8 | Corbett Sports Center (1,054); Greensboro, NC |
| December 17, 2023*; 2:00 p.m., ESPN+ | | Jacksonville | W 74–63 | 5–8 | Hawkins Arena (63); Macon, GA |
| December 21, 2023*; 12:00 p.m., ESPN+ | | at Appalachian State | L 78–81 | 5–9 | Holmes Center (196); Boone, NC |
| December 30, 2023*; 2:00 p.m., ESPN+ | | Bethune–Cookman | L 58–60 | 5–10 | Hawkins Arena (513); Macon, GA |
| January 2, 2024*; 7:00 p.m., ESPN+ | | Kennesaw State | W 70–54 | 6–10 | Hawkins Arena (483); Macon, GA |
SoCon regular season
| January 10, 2024; 7:00 p.m., ESPN+ | | at Chattanooga | L 57–66 | 6–11 (0–1) | McKenzie Arena (1,446); Chattanooga, TN |
| January 13, 2024; 2:00 p.m., ESPN+ | | at East Tennessee State | L 71–77 | 6–12 (0–2) | Brooks Gymnasium (561); Johnson City, TN |
| January 18, 2024; 7:00 p.m., ESPN+ | | UNC Greensboro | W 76–52 | 7–12 (1–2) | Hawkins Arena (753); Macon, GA |
| January 20, 2024; 2:00 p.m., ESPN+ | | Western Carolina | W 78–44 | 8–12 (2–2) | Hawkins Arena (607); Macon, GA |
| January 25, 2024; 6:00 p.m., ESPN+ | | at Wofford | L 64–65 | 8–13 (2–3) | Jerry Richardson Indoor Stadium (414); Spartanburg, SC |
| January 27, 2024; 2:00 p.m., ESPN+ | | at Furman | L 56–58 | 8–14 (2–4) | Timmons Arena (518); Greenville, SC |
| February 3, 2024; 3:00 p.m., ESPN+ | | at Samford | W 87–59 | 9–14 (3–4) | Pete Hanna Center (312); Homewood, AL |
| February 8, 2024; 7:00 p.m., ESPN+ | | East Tennessee State | W 65–57 | 10–14 (4–4) | Hawkins Arena (618); Macon, GA |
| February 10, 2024; 2:00 p.m., ESPN+ | | Chattanooga | L 52–61 | 10–15 (4–5) | Hawkins Arena (1,627); Macon, GA |
| February 15, 2024; 7:00 p.m., ESPN+ | | at Western Carolina | W 76–62 | 11–15 (5–5) | Ramsey Center (642); Cullowhee, NC |
| February 17, 2024; 2:00 p.m., ESPN+ | | at UNC Greensboro | L 49–69 | 11–16 (5–6) | Fleming Gymnasium (396); Greensboro, NC |
| February 22, 2024; 7:00 p.m., ESPN+ | | Furman | W 55–50 | 12–16 (6–6) | Hawkins Arena (473); Macon, GA |
| February 24, 2024; 2:00 p.m., ESPN+ | | Wofford | W 79–74 | 13–16 (7–6) | Hawkins Arena (1,272); Macon, GA |
| March 2, 2024; 2:00 p.m., ESPN+ | | Samford | W 76–69 | 14–16 (8–6) | Hawkins Arena (1,072); Macon, GA |
SoCon tournament
| March 7, 2024; 5:45 p.m., ESPN+ | (4) | vs. (5) East Tennessee State; Quarterfinals | W 67–52 | 15–16 | Harrah's Cherokee Center (3,029); Asheville, NC |
| March 8, 2024; 11:00 a.m., ESPN+ | (4) | vs. (1) Chattanooga; Semifinals | L 55–66 | 15–17 | Harrah's Cherokee Center (–); Asheville, NC |
*Non-conference game. ^{#}Rankings from AP poll. (#) Tournament seedings in parentheses. All times are in Eastern.
