= 2023–24 NC State Wolfpack women's basketball team =

Intercollegiate basketball season

2023–24 NC State Wolfpack women's basketball

Paradise Jam Island champions

NCAA tournament, Final Four
- Conference: Atlantic Coast Conference

Ranking
- Coaches: No. 4
- AP: No. 4
- Record: 31–7 (13–5 ACC)
- Head coach: Wes Moore (11th season)
- Assistant coaches: Nikki West; Brittany Morris; Ashley Williams; Houston Fancher
- Home arena: Reynolds Coliseum

2023–24 ACC women's basketball standings
| | Conf. | | | | Overall |
| Team | W | | L | PCT | W | | L | PCT |
|---|---|---|---|---|---|---|---|---|
| No. 18 Virginia Tech | 14 | – | 4 | .778 | 25 | – | 8 | .758 |
| No. 4 NC State | 13 | – | 5 | .722 | 31 | – | 7 | .816 |
| No. 20 Syracuse | 13 | – | 5 | .722 | 24 | – | 8 | .750 |
| No. 11 Notre Dame † | 13 | – | 5 | .722 | 28 | – | 7 | .800 |
| Louisville | 12 | – | 6 | .667 | 24 | – | 10 | .706 |
| Florida State | 12 | – | 6 | .667 | 23 | – | 11 | .676 |
| No. 17 Duke | 11 | – | 7 | .611 | 22 | – | 12 | .647 |
| North Carolina | 11 | – | 7 | .611 | 20 | – | 13 | .606 |
| Miami (FL) | 8 | – | 10 | .444 | 19 | – | 12 | .613 |
| Georgia Tech | 7 | – | 11 | .389 | 17 | – | 16 | .515 |
| Virginia | 7 | – | 11 | .389 | 16 | – | 16 | .500 |
| Clemson | 5 | – | 13 | .278 | 12 | – | 19 | .387 |
| Boston College | 5 | – | 13 | .278 | 14 | – | 19 | .424 |
| Wake Forest | 2 | – | 16 | .111 | 7 | – | 25 | .219 |
| Pittsburgh | 2 | – | 16 | .111 | 8 | – | 24 | .250 |
† 2024 ACC tournament winner Rankings from AP poll

The 2023–24 NC State Wolfpack women's basketball team represented North Carolina State University during the 2023–24 NCAA Division I women's basketball season. The Wolfpack were led by eleventh-year head coach Wes Moore and played their home games at Reynolds Coliseum as members of the Atlantic Coast Conference.

The Wolfpack got off to a hot start to the season when they upset second ranked Connecticut in the second game of the season. The Wolfpack were unranked at the time and vaulted to fourteenth in the nation with the win. They carried their momentum through the Paradise Jam, defeating number 3 Colorado to win the championship. After the tournament win, the team was ranked fifth. Following and ACC–SEC Challenge win over Vanderbilt and a win over Illinois State, the Wolfpack reached their season highest ranking of third. The Wolfpack finished off the non-conference season with three more wins, and finished that portion of the season undefeated. The Wolfpack started the ACC season with wins over Virginia and an overtime victory over number 22 Florida State. Their first loss of the season was not until January 7, 2024, when they lost away to number 13 Virginia Tech. They were upset just two games later against Miami (FL), but then won five straight games, including a rivalry game against number 24 North Carolina and over number 15 Louisville. The Wolfpack were again ranked third before losing again to Virginia Tech, this time when the Hokies were ranked number 16. They defeated number 16 Notre Dame and survived an upset scare in overtime against Georgia Tech before losing their rivalry rematch with North Carolina and losing at Duke. They finished the season with an overtime win over number 19 Syracuse and a final game victory over Wake Forest.

The Wolfpack finished the season 31–7 overall and 13–5 in ACC play to finish in a three-way tie for second place. As the second seed in the ACC tournament, they earned a bye into the quarterfinals, where they defeated seventh seed Duke. They defeated sixth seed Florida State to reach the finals. They could not prevail in a low-scoring game and lost 55–51. They received an at-large invitation to the NCAA Tournament, marking the sixth straight time the Wolfpack qualified for the tournament. As the third seed in the Portland 4 region they defeated fourteenth seed Chattanooga in the first round, sixth seed Tennessee in the second round, second seed Stanford in the Sweet 16, and regional first seed Texas in the Elite Eight to qualify for the second Final Four in program history. In the Final Four, they could not overcome overall first seed South Carolina, and lost 78–59 to end their season.

== Previous season ==
The Wolfpack finished the season 20–12 overall and 9–9 in ACC play to finish in a tie for eighth place. As the eighth seed in the ACC tournament, they earned a bye to the second round, where they defeated ninth seed Syracuse, then lost to first seed Notre Dame in the quarterfinals. They earned an at-large bid to the NCAA tournament, where they were the seventh seed in the Greenville 2 Region. They were upset by ten-seed Princeton in the first round to end their season.

== Off-season ==
=== Departures ===
Departures
| Name | Number | Pos. | Height | Year | Hometown | Reason for departure |
|---|---|---|---|---|---|---|
| Diamond Johnson | 3 | G | 5'5" | Junior | Philadelphia, Pennsylvania | Transferred to Norfolk State |
| Jada Boyd | 5 | F | 6'2" | Senior | Petersburg, Virginia | Graduated |
| Jakia Brown-Turner | 11 | G/F | 6'0" | Senior | Temple Hills, Maryland | Transferred to Maryland |
| Jessica Timmons | 23 | G | 5'8" | Freshman | Charlotte, North Carolina | Transferred to Alabama |
| Sophie Hart | 32 | C | 6'5" | Sophomore | Farmington, Minnesota | Transferred to Minnesota |
| Camille Hobby | 41 | C | 6'3" | Senior | Jacksonville, Florida | Graduated; transferred to Illinois |

=== Incoming transfers ===
Incoming transfers
| Name | Number | Pos. | Height | Year | Hometown | Previous school |
|---|---|---|---|---|---|---|
| Lizzy Williamson | 15 | C | 6'5" | Graduate student | Adelaide, Australia | Southern Utah |
| Katie Peneueta | 20 | F | 6'2" | Junior | Vancouver, Washington | Sacramento State |

=== Recruiting class ===
College recruiting
| Name | Hometown | School | Height | Weight | Commit date |
|---|---|---|---|---|---|
| Zoe Brooks; G | Plainfield, New Jersey | St. John Vianney | 5 ft 10 in (1.78 m) | N/A | |
| Zoe Brooks; G | Recruit ratings: ESPN: (97) | | | | |
| Mallory Collier; C | Millington, Tennessee | Bartlett | 6 ft 3 in (1.91 m) | N/A | |
| Mallory Collier; C | Recruit ratings: ESPN: (93) | | | | |
| Maddie Cox; F | Flower Mound, Texas | Flower Mound | 6 ft 2 in (1.88 m) | N/A | |
| Maddie Cox; F | Recruit ratings: ESPN: (93) | | | | |
| Jannah Eissa; G | Cairo, Egypt | Greenland International | 5 ft 8 in (1.73 m) | N/A | |
| Jannah Eissa; G | Recruit ratings: No ratings found | | | | |
| Alyssa Lewis; G | Harrisburg, North Carolina | Hickory Ridge | 5 ft 7 in (1.70 m) | N/A | |
| Alyssa Lewis; G | Recruit ratings: No ratings found | | | | |
| Laci Steele; G | Edmond, Oklahoma | Edmond North | 5 ft 11 in (1.80 m) | N/A | |
| Laci Steele; G | Recruit ratings: ESPN: (93) | | | | |
Overall recruit ranking:
Note: In many cases, Scout, Rivals, 247Sports, On3, and ESPN may conflict in their listings of height and weight.; In these cases, the average was taken. ESPN grades are on a 100-point scale.; Sources:

== Roster ==
2023–24 NC State Wolfpack women's basketball team
Players
Coaches

| Pos. | # | Name | Height | Year | Previous school | Hometown |
|---|---|---|---|---|---|---|
| C | 1 | River Baldwin | 6 ft 5 in (1.96 m) | GS | Pleasant Home; Florida State | Andalusia, AL |
| F | 2 | Mimi Collins | 6 ft 3 in (1.91 m) | GS | Paul VI Catholic HS; Maryland | Waldorf, MD |
| G | 4 | Alyssa Lewis | 5 ft 7 in (1.7 m) | Fr | Hickory Ridge | Harrisburg, NC |
| G | 10 | Aziaha James | 5 ft 9 in (1.75 m) | Jr | Princess Anne | Virginia Beach, VA |
| F | 11 | Maddie Cox | 6 ft 2 in (1.88 m) | Fr | Flower Mound | Flower Mound, TX |
| C | 15 | Lizzy Williamson | 6 ft 5 in (1.96 m) | GS | Westminster; Southern Utah | Adelaide, Australia |
| F | 20 | Katie Peneueta | 6 ft 2 in (1.88 m) | Jr | Heritage; Sacramento State | Vancouver, WA |
| G | 21 | Madison Hayes | 6 ft 0 in (1.83 m) | Sr | East Hamilton; Mississippi State | Chattanooga, TN |
| G | 22 | Saniya Rivers | 6 ft 1 in (1.85 m) | Jr | Eugene Ashley; South Carolina | Wilmington, NC |
| G | 24 | Laci Steele | 5 ft 11 in (1.8 m) | Fr | Edmond North | Edmond, OK |
| G | 30 | Jannah Eissa | 5 ft 8 in (1.73 m) | Fr | Greenland International | Cairo, Egypt |
| G | 35 | Zoe Brooks | 5 ft 10 in (1.78 m) | Fr | St. John Vianney | Plainfield, NJ |
| C | 42 | Mallory Collier | 6 ft 3 in (1.91 m) | Fr | Bartlett | Millington, TN |

Head coach

- Wes Moore (Johnson)

Assistant coach(es)

- Kikki West (Clemson)
- Brittany Moris (Seton Hall)
- Ashley Williams (NC State)
- Houston Fancher (Middle Tennessee)

Legend

- (C) Team captain
- (S) Suspended
- (I) Ineligible
- (W) Walk-on
- Injured
- Current redshirt

Roster
Last update: November 3, 2023

== Schedule and results ==
| Date time, TV | Rank^{#} | Opponent^{#} | Result | Record | Site (attendance) city, state |
Exhibition
| November 2, 2023*; 7:00 p.m. | | Catawba | W 101–58 | – | Reynolds Coliseum; Raleigh, NC |
Non-conference regular season
| November 7, 2023*; 7:00 p.m., ACCN | | Charlotte | W 84–43 | 1–0 | Reynolds Coliseum (4,496); Raleigh, NC |
| November 12, 2023*; 3:00 p.m., ABC | | No. 2 Connecticut | W 92–81 | 2–0 | Reynolds Coliseum (5,500); Raleigh, NC |
| November 15, 2023*; 7:00 p.m., ACCNX | No. 14 | Elon | W 90–35 | 3–0 | Reynolds Coliseum (4,402); Raleigh, NC |
| November 19, 2023*; 2:00 p.m., ACCNX | No. 14 | Rhode Island | W 67–58 | 4–0 | Reynolds Coliseum (5,023); Raleigh, NC |
| November 23, 2023*; 3:15 p.m., ESPN+ | No. 10т | vs. Kentucky; Paradise Jam Island Division | W 84–55 | 5–0 | Sports and Fitness Center (624); St. Thomas, USVI |
| November 24, 2023*; 3:15 p.m., ESPN+ | No. 10т | vs. Cincinnati; Paradise Jam Island Division | W 79–45 | 6–0 | Sports and Fitness Center (524); St. Thomas, USVI |
| November 25, 2023*; 1:00 p.m., ESPN+ | No. 10т | vs. No. 3 Colorado; Paradise Jam Island Division | W 78–60 | 7–0 | Sports and Fitness Center; St. Thomas, USVI |
| November 29, 2023*; 7:15 p.m., ACCN | No. 5 | Vanderbilt; ACC–SEC Challenge | W 70–62 | 8–0 | Reynolds Coliseum (5,500); Raleigh, NC |
| December 3, 2023*; 2:00 p.m., ACCNX | No. 5 | Illinois State | W 79–61 | 9–0 | Reynolds Coliseum (5,500); Raleigh, NC |
| December 10, 2023*; 2:00 p.m., ACCNX | No. 3 | Liberty | W 80–67 | 10–0 | Reynolds Coliseum (5,500); Raleigh, NC |
| December 16, 2023*; 7:00 p.m., ESPN+ | No. 3 | at South Florida | W 66–54 | 11–0 | Yuengling Center (4,959); Tampa, FL |
| December 20, 2023*; 6:30 p.m., ESPN+ | No. 3 | at Old Dominion; Anne Donovan Classic | W 87–50 | 12–0 | Chartway Arena (3,874); Norfolk, VA |
ACC regular season
| December 31, 2023; 6:00 p.m., ACCN | No. 3 | at Virginia | W 72–61 | 13–0 (1–0) | John Paul Jones Arena (4,541); Charlottesville, VA |
| January 4, 2024; 7:00 p.m., ACCNX | No. 3 | No. 22 Florida State | W 88–80 ^{OT} | 14–0 (2–0) | Reynolds Coliseum (5,500); Raleigh, NC |
| January 7, 2024; 12:00 p.m., ACCN | No. 3 | at No. 13 Virginia Tech | L 62–63 | 14–1 (2–1) | Cassell Coliseum (8,925); Blacksburg, VA |
| January 11, 2024; 7:00 p.m., ACCNX | No. 6 | Virginia | W 93–66 | 15–1 (3–1) | Reynolds Coliseum (5,500); Raleigh, NC |
| January 18, 2024; 6:00 p.m., ACCNX | No. 4 | at Miami (FL) | L 59–73 | 15–2 (3–2) | Watsco Center (2,366); Coral Gables, FL |
| January 21, 2024; 12:00 p.m., ACCN | No. 4 | Duke | W 72–57 | 16–2 (4–2) | Reynolds Coliseum (5,500); Raleigh, NC |
| January 25, 2024; 7:00 p.m., ACCNX | No. 7 | at Clemson | W 71–49 | 17–2 (5–2) | Littlejohn Coliseum (919); Clemson, SC |
| January 28, 2024; 2:00 p.m., ACCNX | No. 7 | at Boston College | W 82–61 | 18–2 (6–2) | Conte Forum (2,180); Chestnut Hill, MA |
| February 1, 2024; 8:00 p.m., ACCN | No. 5 | No. 24 North Carolina; Rivalry | W 63–59 | 19–2 (7–2) | Reynolds Coliseum (5,500); Raleigh, NC |
| February 5, 2024; 6:00 p.m., ESPN2 | No. 3 | No. 15 Louisville | W 77–67 | 20–2 (8–2) | Reynolds Coliseum (5,500); Raleigh, NC |
| February 8, 2024; 8:00 p.m., ACCN | No. 3 | No. 16 Virginia Tech | L 61–72 | 20–3 (8–3) | Reynolds Coliseum (5,500); Raleigh, NC |
| February 11, 2024; 12:00 p.m., ACCNX | No. 3 | at Pittsburgh | W 83–47 | 21–3 (9–3) | Peterson Events Center (2,001); Pittsburgh, PA |
| February 15, 2024; 6:00 p.m., ACCN | No. 6 | at No. 16 Notre Dame | W 59–43 | 22–3 (10–3) | Purcell Pavilion (7,134); Notre Dame, IN |
| February 18, 2024; 12:00 p.m., The CW | No. 6 | Georgia Tech | W 86–85 ^{OT} | 23–3 (11–3) | Reynolds Coliseum (5,500); Raleigh, NC |
| February 22, 2024; 8:00 p.m., ACCN | No. 6 | at North Carolina; Rivalry | L 70–80 | 23–4 (11–4) | Carmichael Arena (4,131); Chapel Hill, NC |
| February 25, 2024; 5:30 p.m., ACCN | No. 6 | at Duke | L 58–69 | 23–5 (11–5) | Cameron Indoor Stadium (4,633); Durham, NC |
| February 29, 2024; 7:00 p.m., ACCNX | No. 12 | No. 19 Syracuse | W 75–71 ^{OT} | 24–5 (12–5) | Reynolds Coliseum (5,500); Raleigh, NC |
| March 3, 2024; 2:00 p.m., ACCNX | No. 12 | Wake Forest | W 75–57 | 25–5 (13–5) | Reynolds Coliseum (5,500); Raleigh, NC |
ACC tournament
| March 8, 2024; 5:00 p.m., ACCN | (2) No. 10 | vs. (7) Duke; Quarterfinals | W 54–51 | 26–5 | Greensboro Coliseum (7,720); Greensboro, NC |
| March 9, 2024; 2:30 p.m., ACCN | (2) No. 10 | vs. (6) Florida State; Semifinals | W 69–43 | 27–5 | Greensboro Coliseum (10,488); Greensboro, NC |
| March 10, 2024; 1:00 p.m., ESPN | (2) No. 10 | vs. (4) No. 14 Notre Dame; Finals | L 51–55 | 27–6 | Greensboro Coliseum (9,102); Greensboro, NC |
NCAA tournament
| March 23, 2024*; 2:30 p.m., ESPNU | (3 P4) No. 11 | (14 P4) Chattanooga; First Round | W 64–45 | 28–6 | Reynolds Coliseum (4,901); Raleigh, NC |
| March 25, 2024*; 4:00 p.m., ESPN | (3 P4) No. 11 | (6 P4) Tennessee; Second Round | W 79–72 | 29–6 | Reynolds Coliseum (4,803); Raleigh, NC |
| March 29, 2024*; 7:30 p.m., ESPN | (3 P4) No. 11 | vs. (2 P4) No. 5 Stanford; Sweet Sixteen | W 77–67 | 30–6 | Moda Center (10,104); Portland, OR |
| March 31, 2024*; 3:00 p.m., ABC | (3 P4) No. 11 | vs. (1 P4) No. 4 Texas; Elite Eight | W 76–66 | 31–6 | Moda Center; Portland, OR |
| April 5, 2024*; 7:00 p.m., ESPN | (3 P4) No. 11 | vs. (1 A1) No. 1 South Carolina; Final Four | L 59–78 | 31–7 | Rocket Mortgage FieldHouse (18,284); Cleveland, OH |
*Non-conference game. ^{#}Rankings from AP Poll. (#) Tournament seedings in parentheses. P4=Portland 4. A1=Albany 1. All times are in Eastern.

== Rankings ==
| + Regular season polls | Poll | Pre- Season | Week 1 | Week 2 | Week 3 | Week 4 | Week 5 | Week 6 | Week 7 | Week 8 | Week 9 | Week 10 | Week 11 | Week 12 | Week 13 | Week 14 | Week 15 | Week 16 | Week 17 | Week 18 | Week 19 | Final |
| AP | RV | 14 | 10т | 5 | 3 | 3 | 3 | 3 | 3 | 6 | 4 | 7 | 5 | 3 | 6 | 6 | 12 | 10 | 11 | 11 | 4 | |
| Coaches | RV | 18 | 16 | 10 | 5 | 4 | 4 | 4 | 4 | 9 | 5т | 7 | 5 | 3 | 7 | 6 | 11 | 10 | 11 | 11 | 4 | |

Legend
| | Increase in ranking |
| | Decrease in ranking |
| | Not ranked in previous week |
| (RV) | Received votes |
| (NR) | Not ranked |
