= 2023–24 Western Carolina Catamounts women's basketball team =

American college basketball season

2023–24 Western Carolina Catamounts women's basketball
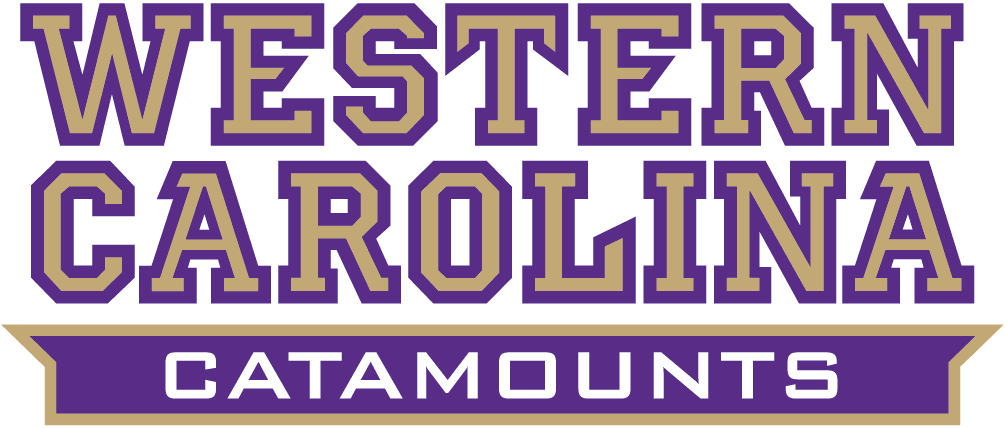
- Conference: Southern Conference
- Record: 6–24 (1–13 SoCon)
- Head coach: Kiley Hill (5th season)
- Associate head coach: Kendra Samuels-Eaton
- Assistant coaches: Eileen Van Horn; Shayna Gore
- Home arena: Ramsey Center

2023–24 Southern Conference women's basketball standings
	Conf.				Overall
Team	W		L	PCT	W		L	PCT
Chattanooga †	13	–	1	.929	28	–	5	.848
UNC Greensboro	8	–	6	.571	21	–	12	.636
Wofford	8	–	6	.571	17	–	13	.567
Mercer	8	–	6	.571	15	–	17	.469
East Tennessee State	7	–	7	.500	18	–	12	.600
Samford	6	–	8	.429	14	–	16	.467
Furman	5	–	9	.357	15	–	16	.484
Western Carolina	1	–	13	.071	6	–	24	.200
† 2024 SoCon tournament winner

The 2023–24 Western Carolina Catamounts women's basketball team represented Western Carolina University during the 2023–24 NCAA Division I women's basketball season. The Catamounts, who were led by fifth-year head coach Kiley Hill, played their home games at the Ramsey Center in Cullowhee, North Carolina as members of the Southern Conference (SoCon).

The Catamounts finished the season 6–24, 1–13 in SoCon play, to finish in eighth (last) place. They were defeated by top-seeded and eventual tournament champions Chattanooga in the quarterfinals of the SoCon tournament.

== Previous season ==
The Catamounts finished the 2022–23 season 9–21, 2–12 in SoCon play, to finish in eighth (last) place. They were defeated by top-seeded Wofford in the quarterfinals of the SoCon tournament.

== Roster ==
2023–24 Western Carolina Catamounts women's basketball team
Players
Coaches

Pos.	#	Name	Height	Year	Previous school	Hometown
F	0	Tamori Plantin	6 ft 1 in (1.85 m)	So	Buford High School	Buford, GA
F	1	Lonasia Brewer	6 ft 0 in (1.83 m)	GS	Toledo	Akron, OH
G	2	Kehinde Obasuyi	5 ft 5 in (1.65 m)	So	Carrollton High School	Villa Rica, GA
G	3	Reagan Trumm	5 ft 9 in (1.75 m)	So	Powell High School	Powell, TN
G	4	Mya Love	5 ft 8 in (1.73 m)	Sr	Arkansas State	Jonesboro, AR
G/F	5	Tyja Beans	5 ft 11 in (1.8 m)	Fr	Spruce Creek High School	Daytona Beach, FL
G	10	Jada Burton	5 ft 8 in (1.73 m)	Jr	Dodge City Community College	Spartanburg, SC
G	11	Chelsea Wooten	5 ft 9 in (1.75 m)	Jr	McLennan Community College	McKinney, TX
G/F	13	Zanoria Cruz	5 ft 10 in (1.78 m)	Sr	Lake Highland Preparatory School	Orlando, FL
F	15	Ewa Kielar	6 ft 1 in (1.85 m)	Sr	South Plains College	Pabianice, Poland
G	22	Nicole Azar	5 ft 11 in (1.8 m)	RS So	Samford	Atlanta, GA
G/F	23	Erin Stack	6 ft 2 in (1.88 m)	So	St. Charles North High School	St. Charles, IL
G	25	Bailey Trumm	5 ft 7 in (1.7 m)	Jr	Appalachian State	Powell, TN
G/F	31	Audrey Meyers	6 ft 0 in (1.83 m)	Sr	Cardinal Newman High School	Columbia, SC
F	35	Tyra Robinson	6 ft 3 in (1.91 m)	Fr	Parkview High School	Little Rock, AR

Head coach

- Kiley Hill (Arkansas Tech)

Assistant coach(es)

- Kendra Samuels-Eaton (Western Carolina)
- Eileen Van Horn (Marist)
- Shayna Gore (Marshall)

Legend

- (C) Team captain
- (S) Suspended
- (I) Ineligible
- (W) Walk-on
- Injured
- Current redshirt

Roster
Last update: May 31, 2024

== Schedule and results ==
Date time, TV	Rank^{#}	Opponent^{#}	Result	Record	Site (attendance) city, state
Non-conference regular season
November 6, 2023*; 7:00 p.m., ESPN+		Agnes Scott	W 101–27	1–0	Ramsey Center (286); Cullowhee, NC
November 9, 2023*; 7:00 p.m., ESPN+		Radford	L 49–67	1–1	Ramsey Center (428); Cullowhee, NC
November 13, 2023*; 7:00 p.m., ESPN+		at UAB	L 56–81	1–2	Bartow Arena (125); Birmingham, AL
November 16, 2023*; 11:00 a.m., FloHoops		at UNC Wilmington	W 54–43	2–2	Trask Coliseum (3,370); Wilmington, NC
November 18, 2023*; 2:00 p.m., FloHoops		at Campbell	L 52–70	2–3	Gore Arena (1,294); Buies Creek, NC
November 22, 2023*; 1:00 p.m., NCCUSN		at North Carolina Central	L 58–69	2–4	McDougald–McLendon Arena (268); Durham, NC
November 28, 2023*; 7:00 p.m., ESPN+		Georgia State	L 57–90	2–5	Ramsey Center (626); Cullowhee, NC
December 2, 2023*; 4:00 p.m., ESPN+		Presbyterian	L 41–60	2–6	Ramsey Center (436); Cullowhee, NC
December 5, 2023*; 11:30 a.m., ESPN+		USC Upstate	L 64–73	2–7	Ramsey Center (1,291); Cullowhee, NC
December 9, 2023*; 7:00 p.m., ESPN+		UNC Asheville	L 48–59	2–8	Ramsey Center (581); Cullowhee, NC
December 15, 2023*; 7:00 p.m., ACCNX		at No. 25 North Carolina	L 36–96	2–9	Carmichael Arena (2,643); Chapel Hill, NC
December 18, 2023*; 2:00 p.m., ESPN+		Murray State	L 79–89	2–10	Ramsey Center (285); Cullowhee, NC
December 20, 2023*; 3:00 p.m., ESPN+		at Queens	W 69–63	3–10	Curry Arena (61); Charlotte, NC
December 30, 2023*; 1:00 p.m., ESPN+		Southern Wesleyan	W 73–34	4–10	Ramsey Center (617); Cullowhee, NC
January 7, 2024*; 2:00 p.m., ESPN+		Montreat	W 58–39	5–10	Ramsey Center (544); Cullowhee, NC
SoCon regular season
January 11, 2024; 7:00 p.m., ESPN+		Furman	L 69–84	5–11 (0–1)	Ramsey Center (526); Cullowhee, NC
January 13, 2024; 2:00 p.m., ESPN+		Wofford	L 56–75	5–12 (0–2)	Ramsey Center (582); Cullowhee, NC
January 18, 2024; 7:00 p.m., ESPN+		at Samford	L 47–48	5–13 (0–3)	Pete Hanna Center (133); Homewood, AL
January 20, 2024; 2:00 p.m., ESPN+		at Mercer	L 44–78	5–14 (0–4)	Hawkins Arena (607); Macon, GA
January 25, 2024; 7:00 p.m., ESPN+		East Tennessee State	L 47–56	5–15 (0–5)	Ramsey Center (558); Cullowhee, NC
January 27, 2024; 2:00 p.m., ESPN+		Chattanooga	L 59–69	5–16 (0–6)	Ramsey Center (795); Cullowhee, NC
February 3, 2024; 2:00 p.m., ESPN+		UNC Greensboro	W 78–71	6–16 (1–6)	Ramsey Center (565); Cullowhee, NC
February 8, 2024; 11:00 a.m., ESPN+		at Wofford	L 52–89	6–17 (1–7)	Jerry Richardson Indoor Stadium (1,507); Spartanburg, SC
February 11, 2024; 2:00 p.m., ESPN+		at Furman	L 53–58	6–18 (1–8)	Timmons Arena (358); Greenville, SC
February 15, 2024; 7:00 p.m., ESPN+		Mercer	L 62–76	6–19 (1–9)	Ramsey Center (642); Cullowhee, NC
February 17, 2024; 7:00 p.m., ESPN+		Samford	L 57–72	6–20 (1–10)	Ramsey Center (689); Cullowhee, NC
February 22, 2024; 7:00 p.m., ESPN+		at Chattanooga	L 56–60	6–21 (1–11)	McKenzie Arena (1,549); Chattanooga, TN
February 24, 2024; 2:00 p.m., ESPN+		at East Tennessee State	L 33–71	6–22 (1–12)	Brooks Gymnasium (1,052); Johnson City, TN
March 2, 2024; 2:00 p.m., ESPN+		at UNC Greensboro	L 54–61	6–23 (1–13)	Fleming Gymnasium (452); Greensboro, NC
SoCon tournament
March 7, 2024; 11:00 a.m., ESPN+	(8)	vs. (1) Chattanooga; Quarterfinals	L 43–64	6–24	Harrah's Cherokee Center (–); Asheville, NC
*Non-conference game. ^{#}Rankings from AP poll. (#) Tournament seedings in parentheses. All times are in Eastern.
