= 2024 Southern Conference women's basketball tournament =

American college basketball tournament

- Classification: Division I
- Season: 2023–24
- Teams: 8
- Site: Harrah's Cherokee Center; Asheville, North Carolina
- Champions: Chattanooga (20th title)
- Winning coach: Shawn Poppie (2nd title)
- MVP: Jada Guinn (Chattanooga)
- Television: Nexstar, ESPN+, ESPNU

2023–24 Southern Conference women's basketball standings
	Conf.				Overall
Team	W		L	PCT	W		L	PCT
Chattanooga †	13	–	1	.929	28	–	5	.848
UNC Greensboro	8	–	6	.571	21	–	12	.636
Wofford	8	–	6	.571	17	–	13	.567
Mercer	8	–	6	.571	15	–	17	.469
East Tennessee State	7	–	7	.500	18	–	12	.600
Samford	6	–	8	.429	14	–	16	.467
Furman	5	–	9	.357	15	–	16	.484
Western Carolina	1	–	13	.071	6	–	24	.200
† 2024 SoCon tournament winner

The 2024 Southern Conference women's Basketball tournament took place March 7-10, 2024, at the Harrah's Cherokee Center in Asheville, North Carolina. Chattanooga earned an automatic bid to the 2024 NCAA Division I women's basketball tournament.

== Seeds ==
Teams are seeded by record within the conference, with a tiebreaker system to seed teams with identical conference records.

Seed	School	Conf	Overall	Tiebreaker(s)
#1	Chattanooga	13–1	25–4	
#2	UNC Greensboro	8–6	19–10	1–1 vs. Chattanooga
#3	Wofford	8–6	16–12	2–0 vs. ETSU
#4	Mercer	8–6	14–16	1–1 vs. ETSU
#5	East Tennessee State	7–7	18–11	
#6	Samford	6–8	14–15	
#7	Furman	5–9	15–15	
#8	Western Carolina	1–13	6–23	

== Schedule ==
All tournament games are streamed on ESPN+. The championship will be televised across the region on select Nexstar stations and simulcast on ESPN+.

Session	Game	Time	Matchup	Score	Television
Quarterfinals – Thursday, March 7
1	1	11:00 AM	No. 1 Chattanooga vs. No. 8 Western Carolina	64–43	ESPN+
1	2	1:15 PM	No. 2 UNC Greensboro vs. No. 7 Furman	64–44	ESPN+
2	3	3:30 PM	No. 3 Wofford vs. No. 6 Samford	66–45	ESPN+
2	4	5:45 PM	No. 4 Mercer vs. No. 5 East Tennessee State	67–52	ESPN+
Semifinals – Friday, March 8
3	5	11:00 AM	No. 1 Chattanooga vs No. 4 Mercer	66–55	ESPN+
3	6	1:15 PM	No. 2 UNC Greensboro vs No. 3 Wofford	72–62	ESPN+
Championship Game – Sunday, March 10
4	7	Noon	No. 1 Chattanooga vs No. 2 UNC Greensboro	69–60	ESPNU
Game times in EST. Rankings denote tournament seeding.

== Bracket ==
- All times are Eastern.

Quarterfinals; Thursday, March 7 ESPN+
1	Chattanooga	64
8	Western Carolina	43
4	Mercer	67
5	East Tennessee State	52
2	UNC Greensboro	64
7	Furman	44
3	Wofford	66
6	Samford	45

Semifinals; Friday, March 8 ESPN+
1	Chattanooga	66
4	Mercer	55
2	UNC Greensboro	72
3	Wofford	62

Championship Game; Sunday, March 10; ESPNU
1	Chattanooga	69
2	UNC Greensboro	60

* denotes overtime period

== See also ==
- 2024 Southern Conference men's basketball tournament
