= List of Clemson Tigers women's basketball head coaches =

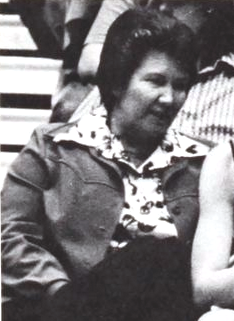
Annie Tribble was head coach from 1976 to 1987.

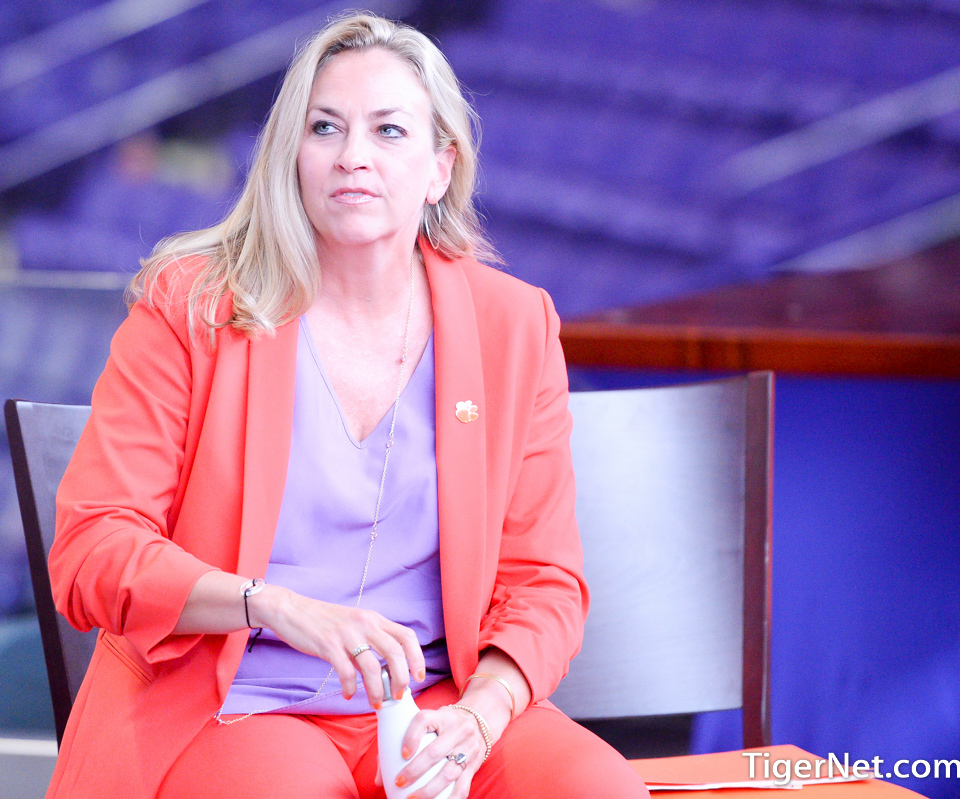
Amanda Butler was head coach from 2018 to 2024.

The Clemson Tigers women's basketball program is a college basketball team that represents Clemson University. They play at the Division I level of the National Collegiate Athletic Association (NCAA).

The program has had eight head coaches. Clemson started an organized women's basketball program in 1975. The women have played in more than 1,000 games in a total of 49 seasons. In those seasons, four coaches have led the Tigers to at least one postseason tournament: Mary King, Annie Tribble, Jim Davis, and Amanda Butler. Davis is the only coach who has won conference championships with the Tigers. He is the all-time leader in games coached, wins, and winning percentage. The current head coach is Shawn Poppie.

== Key ==
General
#	Number of coaches (Note: A running total of the number of coaches of the Tigers. Thus, any coach who has two or more separate terms as head coach is counted only once.)
CCs	Conference championships
*	Conference tournament champion

Overall
GC	Games coached
OW	Wins
OL	Losses
OT	Ties
O%	Winning percentage

Conference
CW	Wins
CL	Losses
C%	Winning percentage

Post-season
PW	Wins
PL	Losses

== Coaches ==
Statistics are correct as of the end of the 2025–26 NCAA Division I women's basketball season.

#	Name	Term	GC	OW	OL	O%	CW	CL	C%	PW	PL	CCs	Awards
1	Mary King	1975–1976	25	14	11	.560	—	—	—	—	—	—	—
2	Annie Tribble	1976–1987	335	200	135	.597	57	53	.518	1	5	—	—
3	Jim Davis	1987–2005	552	355	197	.643	154	124	.554	13	15	2 – 1996, 1999	ACC Coach of the Year (1990, 1999)
4	Cristy McKinney	2005–2010	152	59	93	.388	16	54	.229	—	—	—	—
5	Itoro Umoh-Coleman	2010–2013	88	25	63	.284	10	38	.208	—	—	—	—
6	Audra Smith	2013–2018	90	26	64	.289	5	42	.106	—	—	—	—
7	Amanda Butler	2018–2024	187	81	106	.433	32	73	.305	4	3	—	ACC Coach of the Year (2019)
8	Shawn Poppie	2024–present	64	35	29	.547	17	19	.472	0	1	—	—

Note: Post season records shown for time in Division I only.

== See also ==
- List of Clemson Tigers men's basketball head coaches
