= Shawn Poppie =

American college basketball coach and former player

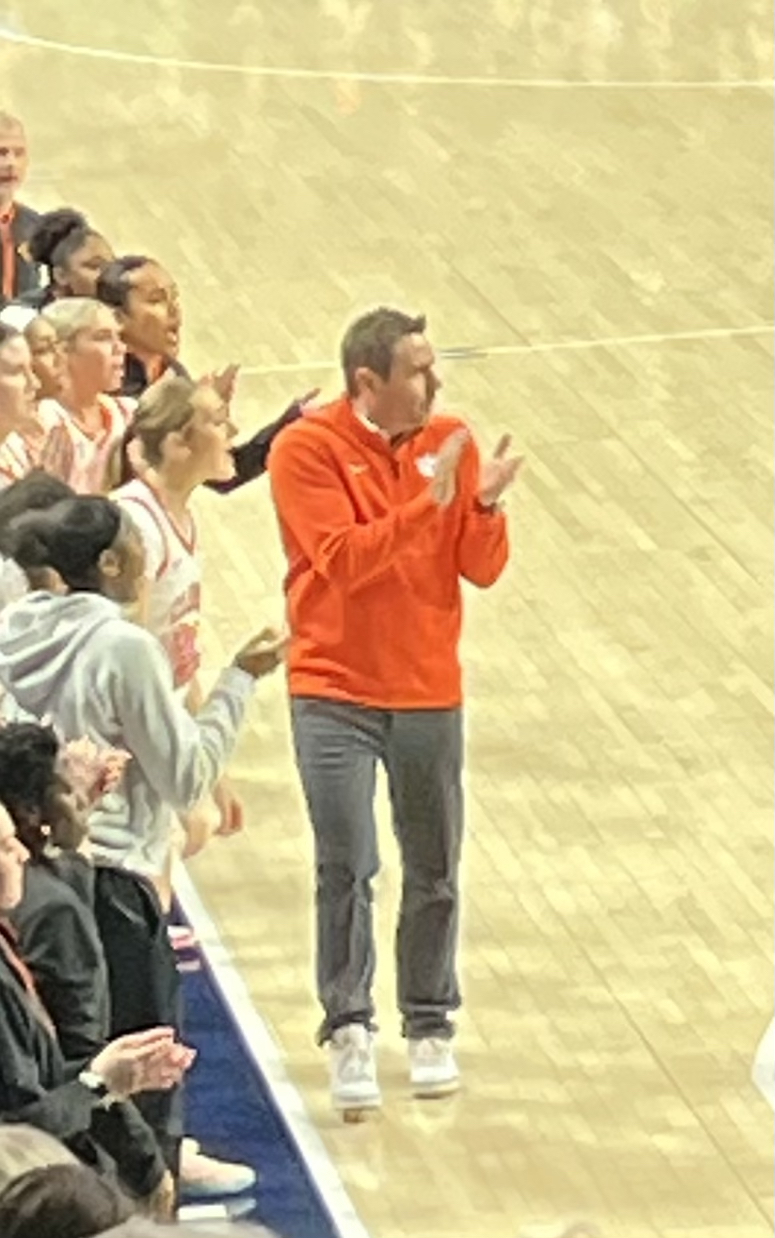
- Poppie in 2026

Current position
- Title: Head coach
- Team: Clemson
- Conference: ACC
- Record: 35–29 (.547)

Biographical details
- Born: April 7, 1985 (age 41); Crescent City, Illinois, U.S.

Playing career
- 2003–2007: Limestone
- Position: Guard

Coaching career (HC unless noted)
- 2011–2013: USC Upstate (Asst.)
- 2013–2016: Furman (Asst.)
- 2016–2020: Virginia Tech (Asst.)
- 2020–2022: Virginia Tech (Assoc. HC)
- 2022–2024: Chattanooga
- 2024–present: Clemson

Head coaching record
- Overall: 83–47 (.638)

Accomplishments and honors

Awards
- Maggie Dixon NCAA Division I Rookie Coach of the Year (2023); Southern Conference Coach of the Year (2023–24)

Shawn Poppie (born April 7, 1985) is an American college basketball coach and former player who is currently the head coach of the Clemson Tigers women's basketball team. He was previously the head coach at Chattanooga.

== Career ==
Poppie played 3 seasons of college basketball at Limestone College. He graduated in 2007 as the school's career leader in assists.

Poppie was an assistant coach at Limestone, USC Upstate, Furman, and Virginia Tech. He was promoted to associate head coach at Virginia Tech before the 2020–21 season.

Poppie became head coach at Chattanooga in 2022. In two seasons, he led the Mocs to a 48–18 overall record, winning the Southern Conference Tournament and appearing in the NCAA Tournament both years.

Poppie was hired as the head coach at Clemson beginning in the 2024–25 season, replacing Amanda Butler.

== Head coaching record ==
Record table
Season	Team	Overall	Conference	Standing	Postseason
Chattanooga Mocs (Southern Conference) (2022–2024)
2022–23	Chattanooga	20–13	9–5	2nd	NCAA First Round
2023–24	Chattanooga	28–5	13–1	1st	NCAA First Round
Chattanooga:		48–18 (.727)	22–6 (.786)		
Clemson Tigers (Atlantic Coast Conference) (2024–present)
2024–25	Clemson	14–17	6–12	T-12th	
2025–26	Clemson	21–12	11–7	T-8th	NCAA First Round
Clemson:		35–29 (.547)	17–19 (.472)		
Total:		83–47 (.638)			
National champion Postseason invitational champion Conference regular season champion Conference regular season and conference tournament champion Division regular season champion Division regular season and conference tournament champion Conference tournament champion
