= International School of Amsterdam =

Coordinates: 52.2897°N 4.8613°E

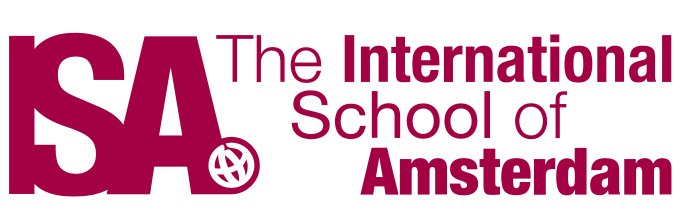

Location
- Sportlaan 45; Amstelveen, North Holland 1185 TB

Information
- Motto: "To educate for international understanding"
- Established: 1964
- Director: Bernadette Carmody
- Grades: Nursery–12
- Language: English
- Colors: Maroon and White
- Mascot: Bear
- Nickname: Bears
- Website: https://www.isa.nl/

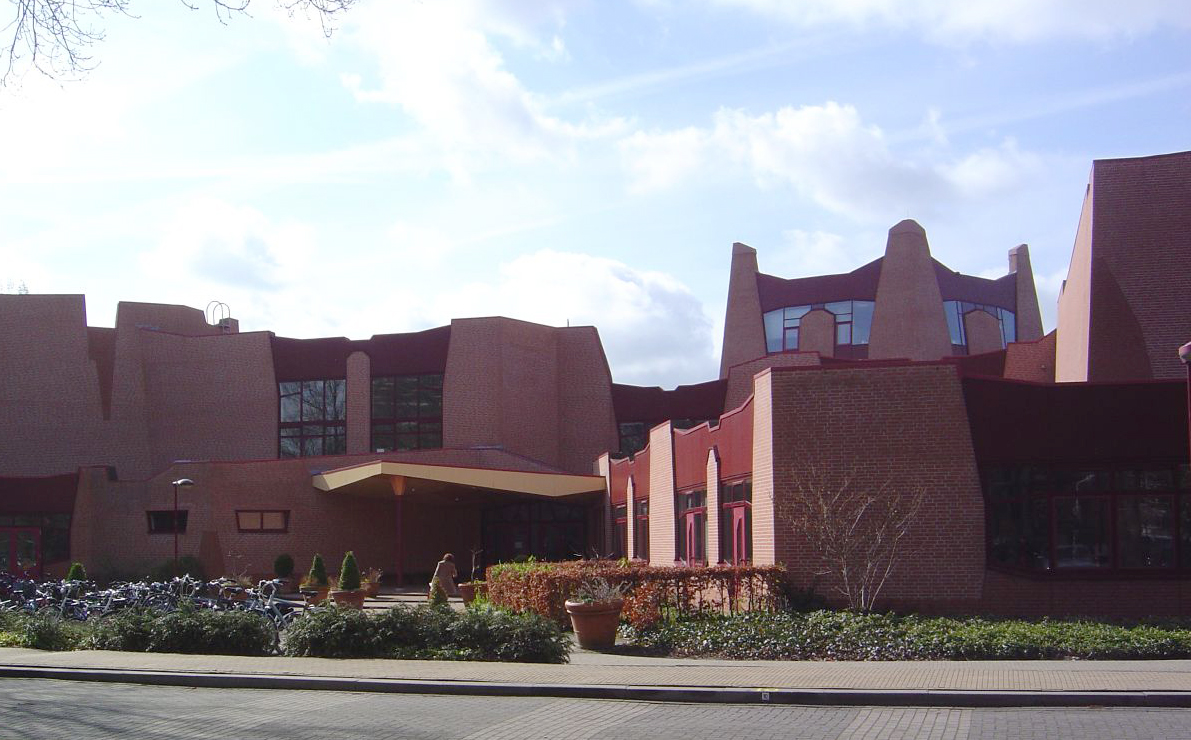
Exterior of the International School of Amsterdam

The International School of Amsterdam (founded in 1964) is a private international school located in the city of Amstelveen, over 11 kilometres (6.8 mi) away from the city centre of Amsterdam. It hosts students from over 60 countries from pre-kindergarten to 12th grade (ages 3–18). The official language and language of instruction of the school is English. Dutch, French, German, Japanese, Mandarin, and Spanish are offered as additional languages. Around 60 other languages are spoken within the school community. The academic program is based on the International Baccalaureate Programme.

As of the 2023-2024 school year, annual tuition rates vary from €19,900 to €28,565. In addition, the school charges a capital fee of €3,075, a €300 application fee, and a PTA fee of €35 per student.

== History ==
The school was founded in 1964, and began offering the International Baccalaureate Diploma in 1979, adding the Middle Years program in 1992. In 1997, with the introduction of the Primary Years program, ISA became the first school to offer International Baccalaureate programmes from pre-school through grade 12.

== Student body ==
In 1997 about 40% of the student body was Japanese.

As of the 2020-2021 school year, ISA has 1,317 students, with 719 of those being in the Upper School (Grades 6 and above). Students were drawn from a total of 60 nationalities, with 52% of those being European, and 13% North American. 11% of the total student body were of Dutch nationality (included in the European nationality count).

== Facilities ==
The School is housed in a purpose-built campus. Facilities include a four-floor library/media center, a 400-seat theatre, science laboratories, woodworking shops, and specialist rooms for music, art, and drama. In addition, the school possesses two gymnasiums, three cafeterias, a small stationery shop, multi-purpose playgrounds and adjacent fields as well as football (International) pitches.

=== Transport Links ===
ISA is served by line 25 of the Amsterdam tram system as part of the wider R-net, in addition to bus lines 274, 347, 348, 357, and 358.

== News ==
The International School of Amsterdam built an extension to its building. Construction began in early June 2013 and concluded in late August 2014.

In 2017, renovation began on an existing gym for the students with plans for adding a weight room, rock wall, and a new cafeteria. Construction concluded in early 2018.
