= List of Clemson Tigers men's basketball head coaches =

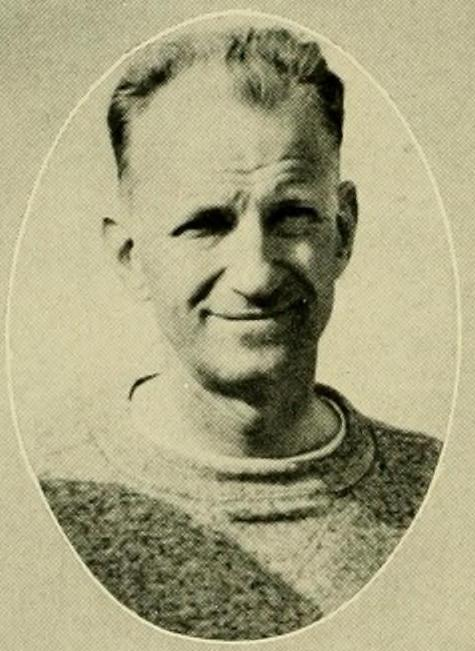
Frank Dobson was Clemson's first basketball coach.

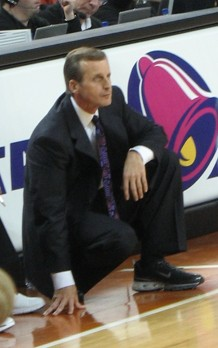
Rick Barnes led Clemson to three consecutive NCAA tournament berths.

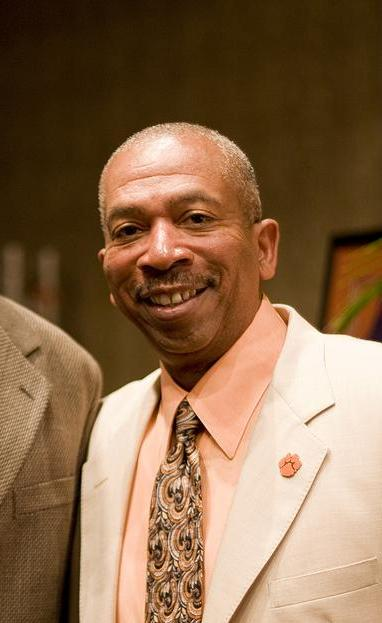
Oliver Purnell led the Tigers to postseason play in six of his seven seasons.

The Clemson Tigers men's basketball program is a college basketball team that represents Clemson University. Both teams play at the Division I level of the National Collegiate Athletic Association (NCAA).

The team has had 22 head coaches. Clemson started organized basketball with the nickname Tigers in 1912. The men's program has played in more than 2,500 games in 105 seasons. In those seasons, seven coaches have led the Tigers to at least one postseason tournament: Tates Locke, Bill Foster, Cliff Ellis, Rick Barnes, Larry Shyatt, Oliver Purnell, and Brad Brownell. Only one coach won a conference championship with the Tigers, Joe Davis in 1939. Frank Dobson, who coached the team in its first two seasons, is the all-time leader in winning percentage. Statistically, Bud Saunders has been the least successful coach of the Tiger men, with a winning percentage of .162. The current men's coach is Brad Brownell, who was hired in 2010.

== Key ==
General
#	Number of coaches (Note: A running total of the number of coaches of the Tigers. Thus, any coach who has two or more separate terms as head coach is counted only once.)
CCs	Conference championships
*	Conference tournament champion

Overall
GC	Games coached
OW	Wins
OL	Losses
OT	Ties
O%	Winning percentage

Conference
CW	Wins
CL	Losses
C%	Winning percentage

Post-season
PW	Wins
PL	Losses

== Coaches ==
Statistics are correct as of the end of the 2025–26 NCAA Division I men's basketball season.

#	Name	Term	GC	OW	OL	OT	O%	CW	CL	C%	PW	PL	CCs	Awards
1	Frank Dobson	1911–1913	18	13	5	0	.722	—	—	—	—	—	—	—
2	John W. Erwin	1913–1915	12	4	8	0	.333	—	—	—	—	—	—	—
3	Audley H. Ward	1915–1916	9	2	6	1	.278	—	—	—	—	—	—	—
4	Country Morris	1916–1917, 1919–1920	24	16	8	0	.667	—	—	—	—	—	—	—
5	Edward "Jiggs" Donahue	1917–1919	9	6	3	0	.667	—	—	—	—	—	—	—
6	Larry Conover	1920–1921	15	10	5	0	.667	—	—	—	—	—	—	—
7	E. J. Stewart	1921–1923	38	19	19	0	.500	3	6	.333	—	—	—	—
8	Bud Saunders	1923–1925	37	6	31	0	.162	3	10	.231	—	—	—	—
9	Tink Gillam	1925–1927	36	6	30	0	.167	2	14	.125	—	—	—	—
10	Josh Cody	1927–1931	88	46	42	0	.523	22	23	.489	—	—	—	—
11	Joe Davis	1931–1940	187	101	86	0	.540	37	47	.440	—	—	1 – 1939^{*}	—
12	Rock Norman	1940–1946	102	32	70	0	.314	18	43	.295	—	—	—	—
13	Banks McFadden	1946–1956	216	85	131	0	.394	46	95	.326 (Note: 45-59 (.433) against SoCon opponents and 1-36 (.027) against ACC opponents.)	—	—	—	—
14	Press Maravich	1956–1962	151	55	96	0	.364	25	59	.298	—	—	—	—
15	Bobby Roberts	1962–1970	198	82	116	0	.414	41	71	.366	—	—	—	—
16	Tates Locke	1970–1975	132	62	70	0	.455	20	42	.323	0	1	—	—
17	Bill Foster	1975–1984	262	156	106	0	.595	44	74	.373	3	4	—	—
18	Cliff Ellis	1984–1994	305	177	128	0	.580	56	90	.384	6	7	—	ACC Coach of the Year (1986–87, 1989–90)
19	Rick Barnes	1994–1998	122	74	48	0	.607	28	36	.438	2	4	—	—
20	Larry Shyatt	1998–2003	154	70	84	0	.455	20	60	.250	4	1	—	—
21	Oliver Purnell	2003–2010	226	138	88	0	.611	52	60	.464	5	6	—	—
22	Brad Brownell	2010–present	523	316	207	0	.604	158	134	.541	10	10	—	—

== See also ==
- List of Clemson Tigers women's basketball head coaches
