= Green Land International Schools =

Green Land Pré Vert International School
- Zayed Nursery Campus: 1st Neighborhood – 7th district, Sheikh Zayed, Egypt Zayed School Campus: 2nd Neighborhood – 5th district, Sheikh Zayed, Egypt Giza Nursery & School- Main Campus: 405 Gezirat Mohamed, Bashteel, Giza, Egypt

Information
- Type: IB school
- Established: 1994
- Age range: Primary Years Programme (IBPYP 2.5–11-years-old), Middle Years Programme (IBMYP 11-16 years old), Diploma Programme (IBDP 16-19 years old).
- Website: School website

Green Land Pré Vert International School (GPIS) (English: Greenland International Schools), (French: Écoles Internationales du Pré Vert) is a school in Egypt offering International Baccalaureate (IB) programs in both English and French for students from kindergarten through 12th grade. The school was founded in 1994.

== Key points ==
With campuses in both Giza and Sheikh Zayed City, GPIS offers all three IB programs: Primary Years Programme (PYP), Middle Years Programme (MYP), and Diploma Programme (DP).

Quality management system: GPIS implements a Quality Management System (QMS) that adheres to ISO 9001:2015 standards to ensure continual improvement. Since 1996, GPIS has maintained ISO certification for its Quality Management System through the British Standards Institute (BSI), with updates to the latest versions: 2000, 2008, and 2015.

== Organization ==
=== Campuses ===
The school's main campus is located in Giza, Egypt. It is surrounded by farmland; hence the name "Green Land". Zayed's nursery was established in 2011. Zayed's school campus was established in 2013, it is located in 2nd Neighborhood – 5th district, Egypt.

Zayed Nursery Campus: PYP1, PYP2 & PYP3 (Pre-KG, KG1 & KG2) students.

Zayed School Campus: PYP4 to DP2 (Primary Years, Middle Years & Diploma) Programs' students.

Giza Main Campus (Nursery & School): PYP1 to DP2 (KG, Primary & Middle Years & Diploma) students.

== Awards and recognition ==
GPIS has received several recognitions:

- 2002: International Star Award for Quality from the Business Initiative Directions (BID – Spain)
- 2007: Robert Blackburn Award (IBO-Geneva) for the best Creativity, Activity, Service (CAS) project in Africa
- 2019: Shortlisted for Excellence in the International Schools Sector – London (International Impact Award) at the International Schools Awards
