= Sigrún Björg Ólafsdóttir =

Icelandic basketball player

Haukar
- Position: Guard
- League: Úrvalsdeild kvenna

Personal information
- Born: 19 June 2001 (age 25) Reykjavík, Iceland
- Listed height: 177 cm (5 ft 10 in)

Career information
- College: Chattanooga (2020–2025)
- Playing career: 2016–present

Career history
- 2016–2020: Haukar
- 2021: Fjölnir
- 2021: → Fjölnir-b
- 2025–present: Haukar

Career highlights
- Icelandic championship (2016); 2× SoCon All-Defensive team (2024, 2025)

Sigrún Björg Ólafsdóttir (born 19 June 2001) is an Icelandic basketball player for Haukarand the Icelandic national team. She started her career with Haukar in the Icelandic Úrvalsdeild kvenna, where she won the national championship in 2018.

== Playing career ==
After coming up through Haukar junior teams, Sigrún played her first games in the top-tier Úrvalsdeild kvenna during the 2016–2017 season. She helped Haukar to the national championship in 2018, scoring 11 points, including three 3-pointers, in the fifth and deciding game of the best-of-five finals series against Valur.

In May 2020, Sigrún agreed to join the University of Tennessee at Chattanooga for the 2020–21 season. On 1 March 2021, it was announced that Sigrún would return to the Úrvalsdeild and play for Fjölnir when her season with Chattanooga would end.

In April 2025, Sigrún rejoined Haukar for the rest of the Úrvalsdeild playoffs.

== National team career ==
Sigrún was first selected to the Icelandic national team training camp in November 2018. She debuted with the team in May 2019.

== Personal life ==
Sigrún is the daughter of Gerður Guðjónsdóttir and Ólafur Rafnsson, the former president of FIBA Europe. Her older sister, Auður Íris Ólafsdóttir, was a member of the Icelandic national team.
