= 2022–23 Chattanooga Mocs women's basketball team =

American college basketball season

2022–23 Chattanooga Mocs women's basketball

SoCon tournament champions

NCAA tournament, First Round
- Conference: Southern Conference
- Record: 20–13 (9–5 SoCon)
- Head coach: Shawn Poppie (1st season)
- Assistant coaches: Jonathon Goldberg; Katelyn Grisillo; Jayda Worthy
- Home arena: McKenzie Arena

2022–23 Southern Conference women's basketball standings
	Conf.				Overall
Team	W		L	PCT	W		L	PCT
Wofford	10	–	4	.714	22	–	10	.688
Chattanooga†	9	–	5	.643	20	–	13	.606
East Tennessee State	9	–	5	.643	26	–	10	.722
Mercer	8	–	6	.571	12	–	16	.429
UNC Greensboro	8	–	6	.571	16	–	14	.533
Samford	7	–	7	.500	13	–	17	.433
Furman	3	–	11	.214	11	–	19	.367
Western Carolina	2	–	12	.143	9	–	21	.300
† 2023 SoCon Tournament winner As of March 19, 2023

The 2022–23 Chattanooga Mocs women's basketball team represented the University of Tennessee at Chattanooga during the 2022–23 NCAA Division I women's basketball season. The Mocs, led by first-year head coach Shawn Poppie, played their home games at the McKenzie Arena as members of the Southern Conference (SoCon).

== Previous season ==
The Mocs finished the season 11–18, 10–4 in a three-way tie for fifth place in the SoCon, losing to Furman in the first round of the conference tournament.

== Roster ==
2022–23 Chattanooga Mocs women's basketball team
Players
Coaches

Pos.	#	Name	Height	Year	Previous school	Hometown
G	1	Audrey Canter	5 ft 9 in (1.75 m)	Jr	Silverdale Baptist Academy	Chattanooga, TN
G	2	Brooklyn Crouch	5 ft 7 in (1.7 m)	Fr	Upperman	Cookeville, TN
F/C	3	Takia Davis	6 ft 2 in (1.88 m)	So	Calhoun County; USC Aiken	Calhoun, GA
G	5	Sigrún Björg Ólafsdóttir	5 ft 9 in (1.75 m)	So	Flensborg	Hafnarfjörður, Iceland
G	10	Lamiah Walker	5 ft 11 in (1.8 m)	So	Signal Mountain; Austin Peay	Chattanooga, TN
G	12	Destiny McClendon	5 ft 8 in (1.73 m)	So	Lake Oconee Academy	Greensboro, GA
G	13	Yazz Wazeerud-Din	5 ft 11 in (1.8 m)	Sr	Wheeler/Pope; Stetson	Marietta, GA
G	21	Addie Porter	5 ft 4 in (1.63 m)	So	Lebanon	Lebanon, TN
F	24	Forde Flos van der Schans	6 ft 4 in (1.93 m)	Fr	Orange Lions Academy	Amsterdam, the Netherlands
F	25	Abbey Cornelius	6 ft 2 in (1.88 m)	Sr	Hardin Valley Academy	Knoxville, TN
F	32	Raven Thompson	5 ft 10 in (1.78 m)	Fr	Langston Hughes	Atlanta, GA
F	33	Karsen Murphy	6 ft 0 in (1.83 m)	So	Dawson County; Montana	Glendive, MT

Head coach

- Shawn Poppie (Limestone)

Assistant coach(es)

- Jonathon Goldberg (Emerson College)
- Katelyn Grisillo (USC Aiken)
- Jayda Worthy (Radford)

Legend

- (C) Team captain
- (S) Suspended
- (I) Ineligible
- (W) Walk-on
- Injured
- Current redshirt

Roster

== Schedule ==
Date time, TV	Rank^{#}	Opponent^{#}	Result	Record	Site (attendance) city, state
Non-conference regular Season
November 7, 2022*; 7:00 p.m., ESPN+		Young Harris	W 65–39	1–0	McKenzie Arena (1,134); Chattanooga, TN
November 9, 2022*; 7:30 p.m., ESPN+		at Belmont	L 54–56	1–1	Curb Event Center (1,141); Nashville, TN
November 12, 2022*; 7:00 p.m.		Austin Peay	L 53–58	1–2	McKenzie Arena (1,103); Chattanooga, TN
November 16, 2022*; 7:00 p.m., ESPN+		Tennessee State	W 60–31	2–2	McKenzie Arena (1,117); Chattanooga, TN
November 19, 2022*; 7:00 p.m., ESPN3		at Murray State	L 56–59	2–3	CFSB Center (1,122); Murray, KY
November 21, 2022*; 7:00 p.m., ESPN+		Kennesaw State	W 72–59	3–3	McKenzie Arena (1,010); Chattanooga, TN
November 23, 2022*; 2:00 p.m., ESPN+		at UNC Asheville	W 60–48	4–3	Kimmel Arena (375); Asheville, NC
November 26, 2022*; 1:00 p.m., ESPN+		King University	W 62–47	5–3	McKenzie Arena (1,082); Chattanooga, TN
November 30, 2022*; 6:30 p.m., ESPN+		at Georgia State	W 74–60	6–3	GSU Convocation Center (497); Atlanta, GA
December 3, 2022*; 1:00 p.m., SECN+		at Alabama	L 52–61	6–4	Coleman Coliseum (1,849); Tuscaloosa, AL
December 6, 2022*; 6:30 p.m., SECN+		at Tennessee	L 39–69	6–5	Thompson–Boling Arena (6,871); Knoxville, TN
December 15, 2022*; 7:00 p.m., ESPN+		at North Alabama	W 55–44	7–5	Flowers Hall (433); Florence, AL
December 18, 2022*; 1:00 p.m., ESPN+		at Ohio	W 67–55	8–5	Convocation Center (334); Athens, OH
December 21, 2022*; 1:00 p.m., ESPN+		at Marshall	L 56–60	8–6	Cam Henderson Center (496); Huntington, WV
December 29, 2022*; 7:00 p.m., ESPN+		Jacksonville State	L 51–59	8–7	McKenzie Arena (1,231); Chattanooga, TN
SoCon regular season
January 5, 2023; 7:00 p.m., ESPN+		at East Tennessee State	W 53–50	9–7 (1–0)	Brooks Gymnasium (558); Johnson City, TN
January 12, 2023; 7:00 p.m., ESPN+		Samford	L 53–58	9–8 (1–1)	McKenzie Arena (1,298); Chattanooga, TN
January 14, 2023; 2:00 p.m., ESPN+		Mercer	W 78–70 ^{OT}	10–8 (2–1)	McKenzie Arena (1,221); Chattanooga, TN
January 19, 2023; 6:00 p.m., ESPN+		at Wofford	L 51–64	10–9 (2–2)	Jerry Richardson Indoor Stadium (486); Spartanburg, SC
January 21, 2023; 2:00 p.m., ESPN+		at Furman	W 51–44 ^{2OT}	11–9 (3–2)	Timmons Arena (667); Greenville, SC
January 26, 2023; 7:00 p.m., ESPN+		UNC Greensboro	W 67–46	12–9 (4–2)	McKenzie Arena (1,189); Chattanooga, TN
January 28, 2023; 2:00 p.m., ESPN+		Western Carolina	L 48–56	12–10 (4–3)	McKenzie Arena (1,545); Chattanooga, TN
February 4, 2023; 2:00 p.m., ESPN+		East Tennessee State	W 73–62	13–10 (5–3)	McKenzie Arena (1,623); Chattanooga, TN
February 9, 2023; 7:00 p.m., ESPN+		at Mercer	W 64–61	14–10 (6–3)	Hawkins Arena (1,010); Macon, GA
February 11, 2023; 5:30 p.m., ESPN+		at Samford	W 60–55	15–10 (7–3)	Pete Hanna Center (382); Homewood, AL
February 16, 2023; 7:00 p.m., ESPN+		Furman	W 70–63	16–10 (8–3)	McKenzie Arena (1,445); Chattanooga, TN
February 18, 2023; 7:00 p.m., ESPN3		Wofford	L 53–72	16–11 (8–4)	McKenzie Arena (1,541); Chattanooga, TN
February 23, 2023; 7:00 p.m., ESPN+		at Western Carolina	W 62–44	17–11 (9–4)	Ramsey Center (376); Cullowhee, NC
February 25, 2023; 4:00 p.m., ESPN3		at UNC Greensboro	L 54–56	17–12 (9–5)	Fleming Gymnasium (520); Greensboro, NC
SoCon women's tournament
March 2, 2023; 3:30 p.m., ESPN+	(2)	vs. (7) Furman; Quarterfinals	W 63–52	18–12	Harrah's Cherokee Center; Asheville, NC
March 3, 2023; 1:15 p.m., ESPN+	(2)	vs. (3) East Tennessee State; Semifinals	W 69–40	19–12	Harrah's Cherokee Center (2,347); Asheville, NC
March 4, 2023; 12:00 p.m., ESPN+	(2)	vs. (1) Wofford; Final	W 63–53	20–12	Harrah's Cherokee Center (2,250); Asheville, NC
NCAA Women's Tournament
March 16, 2023*; 5:30 p.m., ESPNU	(16 S3)	at (1 S3) No. 4 Virginia Tech; First Round	L 33–58	20–13	Cassell Coliseum (8,925); Blacksburg, VA
*Non-conference game. ^{#}Rankings from AP Poll. (#) Tournament seedings in parentheses. S3=Seattle 3. All times are in Eastern Time.
