= 2023 Southern Conference women's basketball tournament =

American college basketball tournament

- Classification: Division I
- Season: 2022–23
- Teams: 8
- Site: Harrah's Cherokee Center; Asheville, North Carolina
- Champions: Chattanooga (19th title)
- Winning coach: Shawn Poppie (1st title)
- MVP: Raven Thompson (Chattanooga)
- Television: Nexstar, ESPN+

2022–23 Southern Conference women's basketball standings
| | Conf. | | | | Overall |
| Team | W | | L | PCT | W | | L | PCT |
|---|---|---|---|---|---|---|---|---|
| Wofford | 10 | – | 4 | .714 | 22 | – | 10 | .688 |
| Chattanooga† | 9 | – | 5 | .643 | 20 | – | 13 | .606 |
| East Tennessee State | 9 | – | 5 | .643 | 26 | – | 10 | .722 |
| Mercer | 8 | – | 6 | .571 | 12 | – | 16 | .429 |
| UNC Greensboro | 8 | – | 6 | .571 | 16 | – | 14 | .533 |
| Samford | 7 | – | 7 | .500 | 13 | – | 17 | .433 |
| Furman | 3 | – | 11 | .214 | 11 | – | 19 | .367 |
| Western Carolina | 2 | – | 12 | .143 | 9 | – | 21 | .300 |
† 2023 SoCon Tournament winner As of March 19, 2023

The 2023 Southern Conference women's Basketball tournament was held March 2–5, 2023, at the Harrah's Cherokee Center in Asheville, North Carolina. Chattanooga earned an automatic bid to the 2023 NCAA Division I women's basketball tournament.

== Seeds ==
Teams are seeded by record within the conference, with a tiebreaker system to seed teams with identical conference records.

| Seed | School | Conf | Overall | Tiebreaker(s) |
|---|---|---|---|---|
| #1 | Wofford | 10–4 | 20–8 | |
| #2 | Chattanooga | 9–5 | 17–12 | 2–0 vs. East Tennessee State |
| #3 | East Tennessee State | 9–5 | 22–8 | 0–2 vs. Chattanooga |
| #4 | UNC Greensboro | 8–6 | 15–13 | 1–1 vs. Mercer; 1–1 vs. Wofford |
| #5 | Mercer | 8–6 | 12–15 | 1–1 vs. UNC Greensboro; 0–2 vs. Wofford |
| #6 | Samford | 7–7 | 13–16 | |
| #7 | Furman | 3–11 | 11–18 | |
| #8 | Western Carolina | 2–12 | 9–20 | |

== Schedule ==
All tournament games are streamed on ESPN+. The championship will be televised across the region on select Nexstar stations and simulcast on ESPN+.

| Session | Game | Time | Matchup | Television | Attendance |
Quarterfinals – Thursday, March 2
| 1 | 1 | 11:00 AM | No. 1 Wofford 71 vs. No. 8 Western Carolina 56 | ESPN+ | |
| 1 | 2 | 1:15 PM | No. 4 UNC Greensboro 63 vs. No. 5 Mercer 59 ^{OT} | ESPN+ | |
| 2 | 3 | 3:30 PM | No. 2 Chattanooga 63 vs. No. 7 Furman 52 | ESPN+ | |
| 2 | 4 | 5:45 PM | No. 3 East Tennessee State 63 vs. No. 6 Samford 47 | ESPN+ | |
Semifinals – Friday, March 3
| 3 | 5 | 11:00 AM | No. 1 Wofford 68 vs. No. 4 UNC Greensboro 63 | ESPN+ | |
| 3 | 6 | 1:15 PM | No. 2 Chattanooga 69 vs. No. 3 East Tennessee State 40 | ESPN+ | |
Championship Game – Sunday, March 5
| 4 | 7 | Noon | No. 1 Wofford 53 vs. No. 2 Chattanooga 63 | Nexstar | |
Game times in EST. Rankings denote tournament seeding.

== Bracket ==
- All times are Eastern.

Quarterfinals; Thursday, March 2, 2023; ESPN+
1 | Wofford | 71
8 | Western Carolina | 56
4 | UNC Greensboro | 63*
5 | Mercer | 59
2 | Chattanooga | 63
7 | Furman | 52
3 | East Tennessee State | 63
6 | Samford | 47

Semifinals; Friday, March 3, 2023; ESPN+
1 | Wofford | 68
4 | UNC Greensboro | 63
2 | Chattanooga | 69
3 | East Tennessee State | 40

Championship Game; Sunday, March 5, 2023; Nexstar
1 | Wofford | 53
2 | Chattanooga | 63

* denotes overtime period

== See also ==
- 2023 Southern Conference men's basketball tournament
