= Springboro, Ohio =

- City
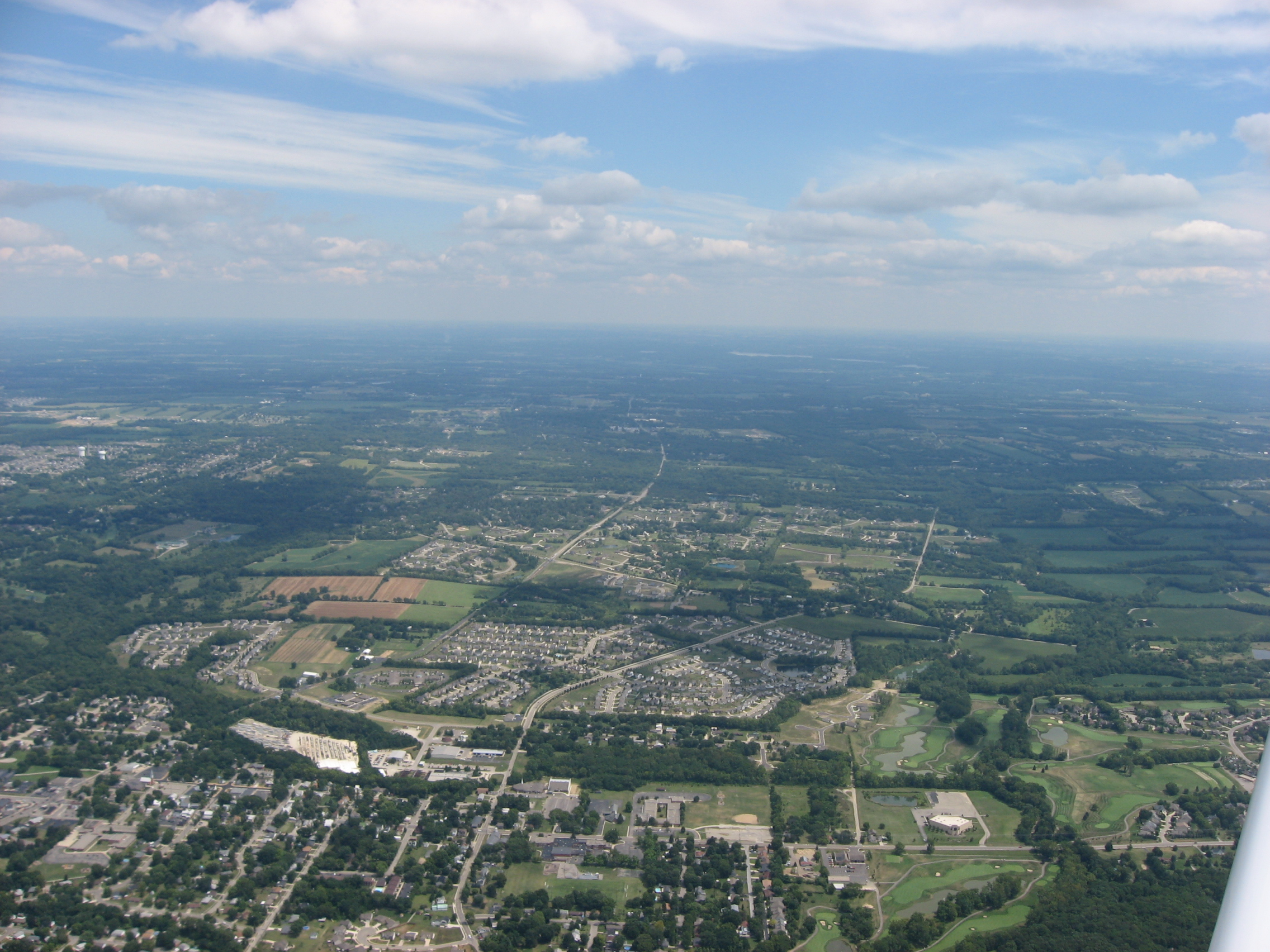
- Lower Springboro from the air
- Motto: "Live. Work. Play. Learn. Grow."
- Interactive map of Springboro, Ohio
- Location within Ohio Location within the United States
- Coordinates: 39°33′35″N 84°15′18″W
- Country: United States
- State: Ohio
- Counties: Warren, Montgomery

Area
  - Total: 9.21 sq mi (23.85 km^{2})
  - Land: 9.21 sq mi (23.85 km^{2})
  - Water: 0 sq mi (0.00 km^{2})
- Elevation: 804 ft (245 m)

Population (2020)
  - Total: 19,062
  - Density: 2,069.9/sq mi (799.21/km^{2})
- Time zone: UTC-5 (Eastern (EST))
  - Summer (DST): UTC-4 (EDT)
- ZIP code: 45066, 45342
- Area codes: 937, 326
- FIPS code: 39-74076
- GNIS feature ID: 2395938
- Website: http://www.cityofspringboro.com/

Springboro is a city in Warren and Montgomery counties in the U.S. state of Ohio. It had a population of 19,062 at the 2020 census. Springboro is a suburb located between Cincinnati and Dayton and is part of the Miami Valley, lying at the center of Greater Cincinnati and Metro Dayton. Most of Springboro is served by the Springboro Community City School District, which oversees the city's public high school, Springboro High School.

== History ==
Settled as early as 1796, Springboro was founded in 1815 by Jonathan Wright as "Springborough." Jonathan Wright's father, Joel, was a surveyor who plotted Columbus, Dayton, and Louisville, Kentucky. Springboro was predominantly Quaker during its early years. By the 1830s, two mills and a woolen factory in Springboro had been built up on the abundant springs for which the town was named.

As a stop on the Underground Railroad, Springboro played a role by providing hiding places for escaping slaves. On October 17, 1999, Springboro was the first city to erect an Ohio Underground Railroad Historic Marker. The dedication was part of the 4th Annual Ohio Underground Railroad Summit.

Beginning in the late 1990s, Springboro experienced population and economic growth due to its position between the Cincinnati and Dayton metropolitan areas. Growth in Springboro led to a new highway exit being created at I-75 & Austin Boulevard and the construction of three new schools by the SCCSD in the 2000s. The mayor of Springboro is John H. Agenbroad, who was reelected in 2019. The vast majority of new development occurred to the east of SR-741 (Main Street).

== Geography ==
Springboro is part of Clearcreek, Turtlecreek, and Franklin townships in Warren County, and Miami Township in Montgomery County. According to the United States Census Bureau, the city has a total area of 9.36 square miles (24.24 km^{2}), all land.

== Demographics ==
Historical population
Census	Pop.	Note	%±
1850	454		—
1860	512		12.8%
1870	477		−6.8%
1880	553		15.9%
1890	413		−25.3%
1900	433		4.8%
1910	355		−18.0%
1920	341		−3.9%
1930	366		7.3%
1940	466		27.3%
1950	516		10.7%
1960	917		77.7%
1970	2,799		205.2%
1980	4,962		77.3%
1990	6,590		32.8%
2000	12,380		87.9%
2010	17,409		40.6%
2020	19,062		9.5%
2025 (est.)	19,606		2.9%

As of the 2010 U.S. Census, the median household income for the city in 2010 was $104,803, and the median family income was $105,681.

As of the 2020 census, Springboro had a population of 19,062, and the median age was 39.1 years. 27.4% of residents were under the age of 18 and 14.9% of residents were 65 years of age or older. For every 100 females there were 94.8 males, and for every 100 females age 18 and over there were 92.2 males age 18 and over.

There were 6,865 households in Springboro, of which 39.8% had children under the age of 18 living in them. Of all households, 66.0% were married-couple households, 10.5% were households with a male householder and no spouse or partner present, and 19.0% were households with a female householder and no spouse or partner present. About 18.6% of all households were made up of individuals and 9.1% had someone living alone who was 65 years of age or older.

There were 7,101 housing units, of which 3.3% were vacant. The homeowner vacancy rate was 0.8% and the rental vacancy rate was 6.1%.

Racial composition as of the 2020 census
Race	Number	Percent
White	16,503	86.6%
Black or African American	529	2.8%
American Indian and Alaska Native	26	0.1%
Asian	748	3.9%
Native Hawaiian and Other Pacific Islander	2	0.0%
Some other race	169	0.9%
Two or more races	1,085	5.7%
Hispanic or Latino (of any race)	521	2.7%

=== 2010 census ===
As of the census of 2010, there were 17,442 people, 5,996 households, and 4,871 families living in the city. The population density was 1,859.9 inhabitants per square mile (718.1/km^{2}). There were 6,263 housing units at an average density of 669.1 per square mile (258.3/km^{2}). The racial makeup of the city was 92.1% White, 2.3% African American, 0.1% Native American, 3.4% Asian, 0.4% from other races, and 1.7% from two or more races. Hispanic or Latino of any race were 1.8% of the population.

There were 5,996 households, of which 47.8% had children under the age of 18 living with them, 69.4% were married couples living together, 8.1% had a female householder with no husband present, 3.7% had a male householder with no wife present, and 18.8% were non-families. 15.8% of all households were made up of individuals, and 6% had someone living alone who was 65 years of age or older. The average household size was 2.89 and the average family size was 3.24.

The median age in the city was 36.4 years. 32.2% of residents were under the age of 18; 5% were between the ages of 18 and 24; 28.5% were from 25 to 44; 25% were from 45 to 64; and 9.3% were 65 years of age or older. The gender makeup of the city was 48.9% male and 51.1% female.

=== 2000 census ===
As of the census of 2000, there were 12,380 people, 4,261 households, and 3,600 families living in the city. The population density was 1,405.1 inhabitants per square mile (542.5/km^{2}). There were 4,423 housing units at an average density of 502.0 per square mile (193.8/km^{2}). The racial makeup of the city was 96.00% White, 0.99% African American, 0.16% Native American, 1.60% Asian, 0.03% Pacific Islander, 0.29% from other races, and 0.92% from two or more races. Hispanic or Latino of any race were 1.00% of the population.

There were 4,261 households, of which 48.2% had children under the age of 18 living with them, 74.8% were married couples living together, 7.3% had a female householder with no husband present, and 15.5% were non-families. 13.0% of all households were made up of individuals, and 3.9% had someone living alone who was 65 years of age or older. The average household size was 2.90 and the average family size was 3.18.

The city's population included 32.3% under the age of 18, 5.1% from 18 to 24, 34.0% from 25 to 44, 22.3% from 45 to 64, and 6.2% who were 65 years of age or older. The median age was 34 years. For every 100 females, there were 95.8 males. For every 100 females age 18 and over, there were 93.9 males.

== Arts and culture ==
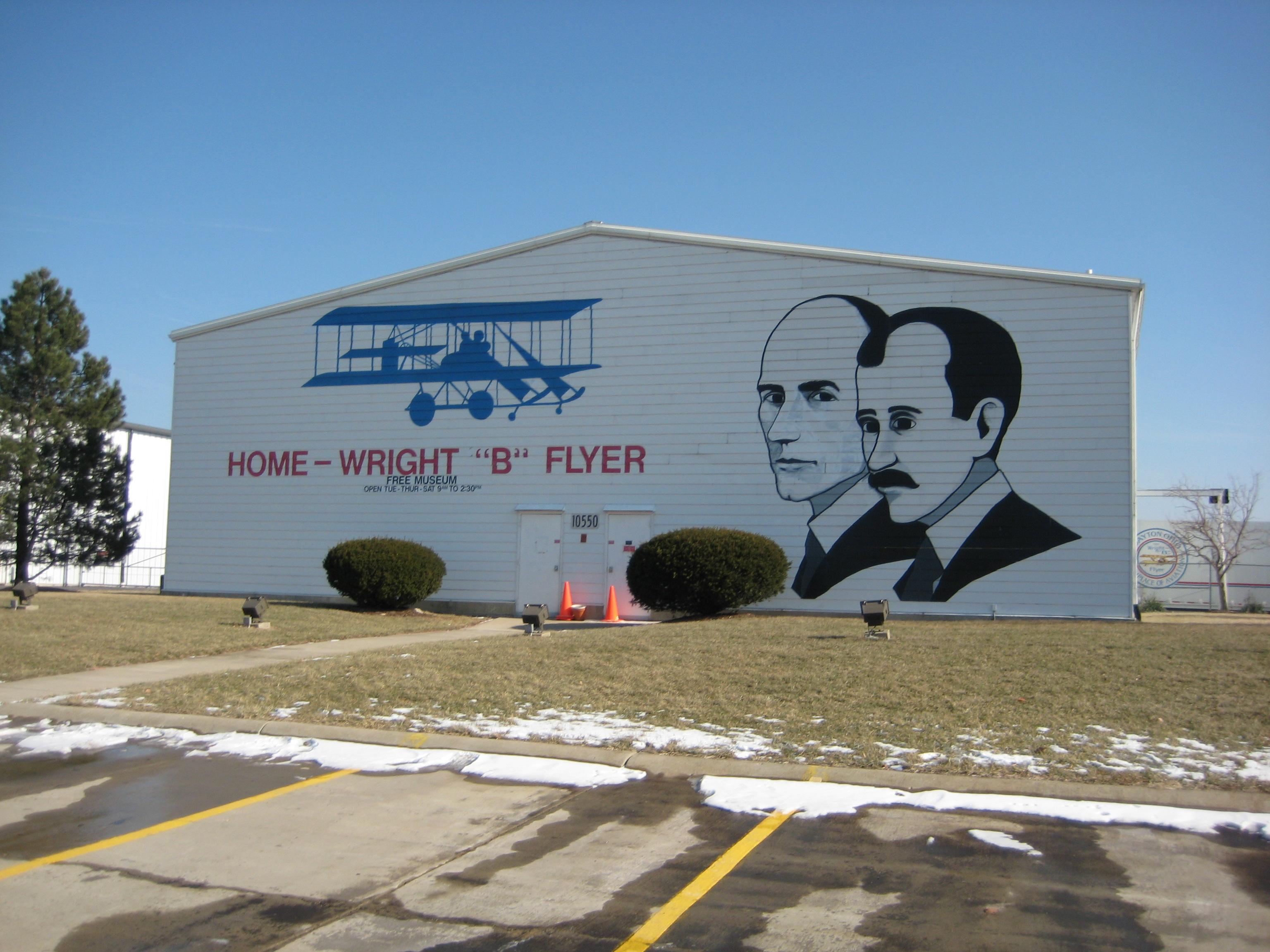
Wright "B" Flyer Museum

The city is home to the 1911 Wright B Flyer Museum, as well as the La Comedia Dinner Theatre. The Springboro Public Library is a branch of the Franklin-Springboro Public Library. The Springboro Community Theatre resides in Springboro, providing opportunities for all ages to act.

== Parks and recreation ==
Golf courses include Heatherwoode Golf Course, a public, city-operated golf course opened in 1991, and Sycamore Creek Country Club.

Parks include Clearcreek Park, Kacie Jane Park and Splash Pad, Community Park, E. Milo Beck, and North Park.

== Education ==
The city is served by the Springboro Community City School District. Springboro High School is located here.

== Infrastructure ==
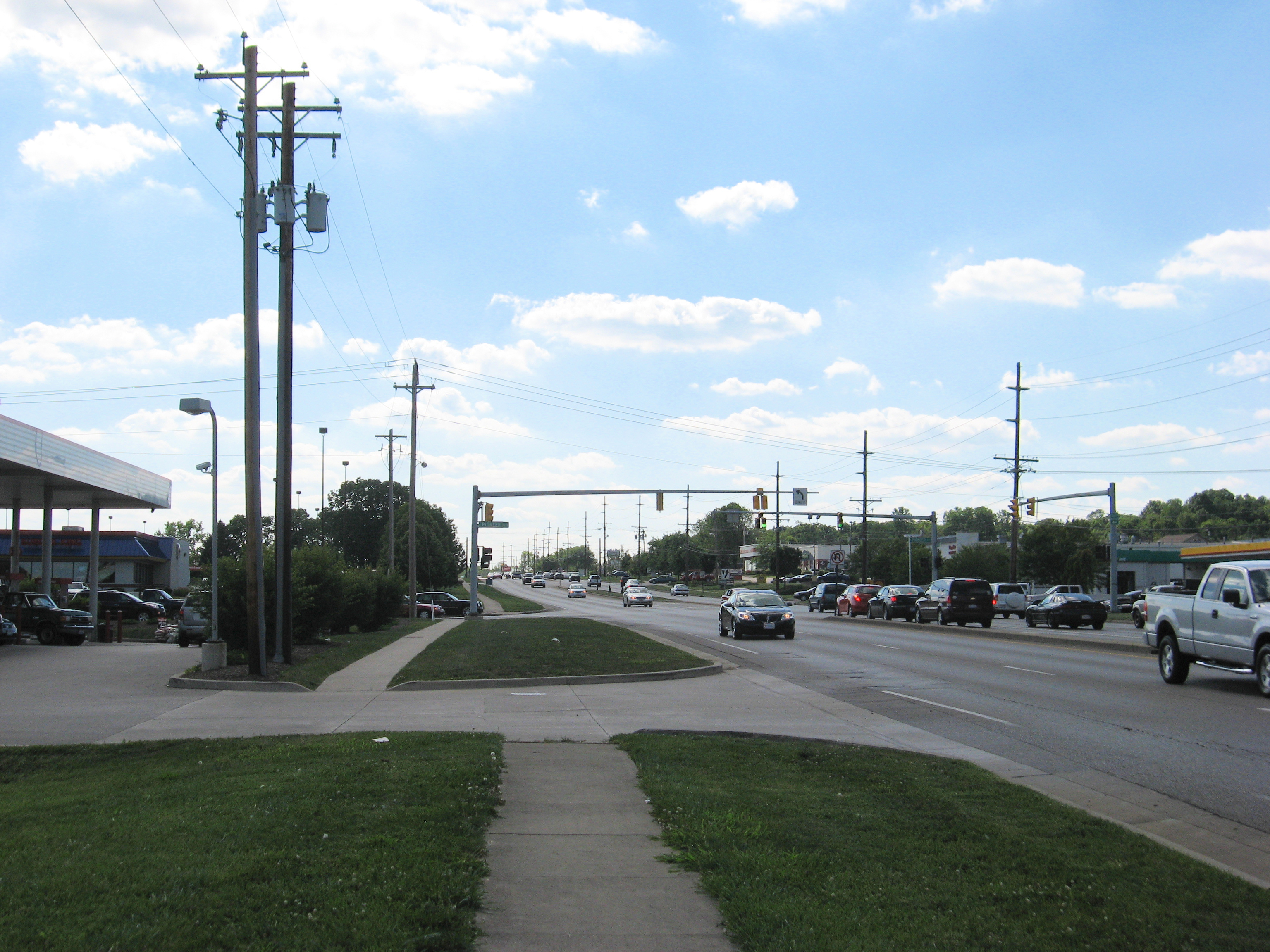
Central Avenue in Springboro

=== Transportation ===
Expressways serving Springboro include:

- Chrysler Expressway / Interstate 75
- Ohio State Route 73
- 3-C Highway/Interstate 71
- Ohio State Route 741
- Ohio State Route 73
- Interstate 675
- Ohio State Route 725

Springboro is served by the Greater Dayton Regional Transit Authority, with a single bus stop at Austin Boulevard and SR-741/Springboro Pike.

Dayton-Wright Brothers Airport serves private jets and small planes. There is a museum with a scale-replica of the original Wright-B Flyer.

=== Public safety ===
The Springboro Police Department employs 32 officers and five civilian staff. Approximately 11 square miles (28 km^{2}) are patrolled with service provided to more than 17,000 residents.

The Clearcreek Fire District provides fire protection for the city of Springboro and Clearcreek Township. The department employs approximately 55 firefighters. The district covers 47 square miles (120 km^{2}), from three stations staffed with 18 firefighters per day. The district responds to around 3,000 calls each year.

== Notable people ==
- Jake Ballard - professional football player in the National Football League (NFL)
- Tony Campana - professional baseball player in Major League Baseball
- A. J. Ewing - professional baseball player in Major League Baseball
- Jordan Hobbs - WNBA third round draft pick
- Mark Johnson - former MLB pitcher
- Ryan Johnson - hammer thrower for Iowa Hawkeyes track and field, NCAA record holder in weight throw
- Tommy Kessler - guitarist for Blondie
- Amy Tucker - Retired coach for Stanford Cardinal Women's Basketball
- Laura Vikmanis - NFL cheerleader and author
