= Springboro High School =

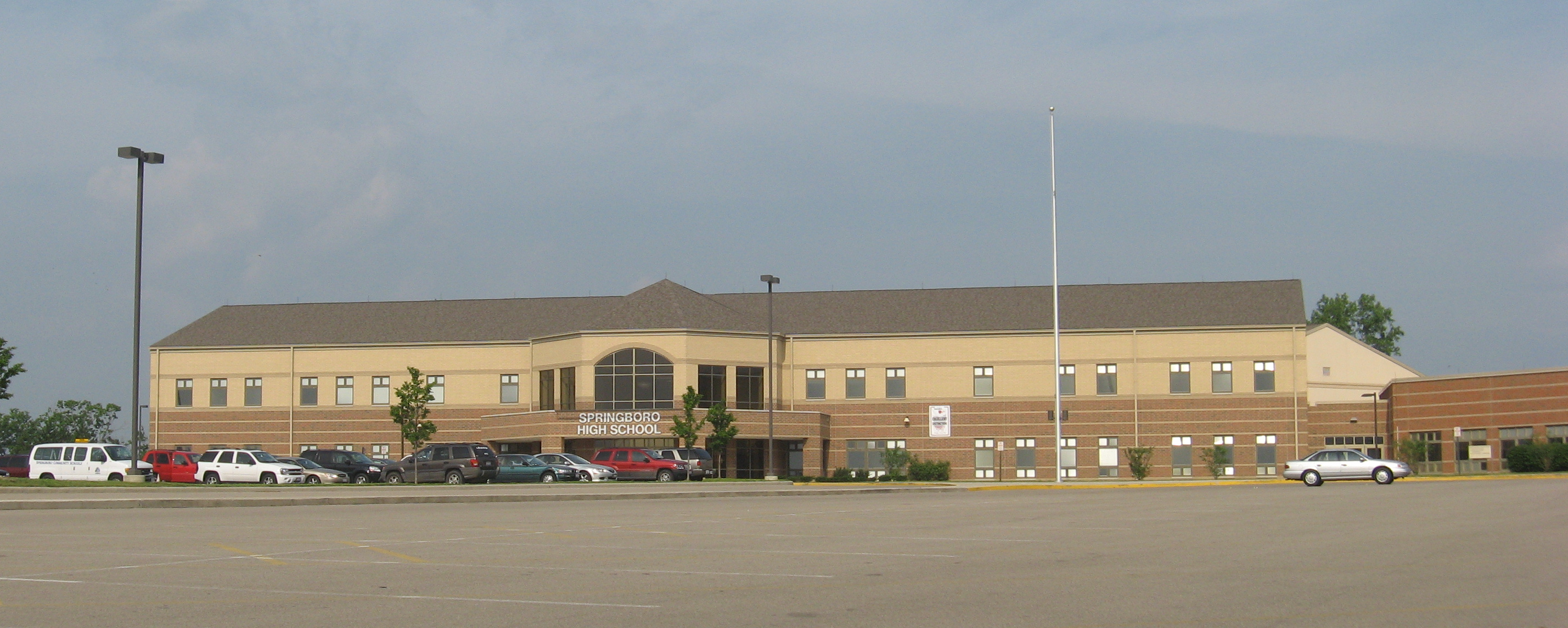
- Springboro High School exterior

Location
- 1675 South Main Street; Springboro, Ohio 45066; United States; 39°31′56″N 84°14′26″W

Information
- Type: Public
- Established: 1893
- Principal: Kyle Martin
- Teaching staff: 75.32 (FTE)
- Enrollment: 2,094 (2023-2024)
- Student to teacher ratio: 27.80
- Colors: Blue and white
- Team name: Panthers
- Website: www.springboro.org/springborohighschool_home.aspx

Springboro High School is a public high school in Springboro, Ohio, United States, with a total of over 2,000 students and 120 teachers. The Springboro Community City School District serves the city of Springboro and parts of Franklin, Clearcreek, Turtlecreek, and Miami (Montgomery County) townships.

Springboro High School is the only public high school in the suburb of Springboro and the only high school in the Springboro Community City School District. The school has been ranked academically "excellent" on a consistent basis, the highest possible rating by the state of Ohio Department of Education. SHS was established in 1893. In the 2011-12 school year SHS was honored as the top public high school in the Great Lakes region and was recognized as part of the United States Department of Education's National Blue Ribbon Schools Program.

The current home of SHS has been open since August 1998 with two new academic wings added on and opened in August 2006. It is Springboro's third building used as the high school within the past 45 years.

== Athletics ==
Springboro High School athletic teams are known as the Panthers, while the school colors are white and royal blue. The athletic program was a charter member of the Fort Ancient Valley Conference from 1964, when it joined as Clearcreek High School, until 1998. After many years of winning the All-Sports Trophy in the former Mid-Miami League, Springboro left for the Greater Western Ohio Conference

Springboro Community Schools have a naming rights deal with Miami Valley Hospital, giving them naming rights to the school's football and track stadium, which is named CareFlight Field for the hospital's "CareFlight" helicopter. This deal also provided CareFlight Field with turf surfacing, a new track, and a three-story building which houses doctors' offices and athletic facilities, along with an adjoining press box. It was completed in 2009.

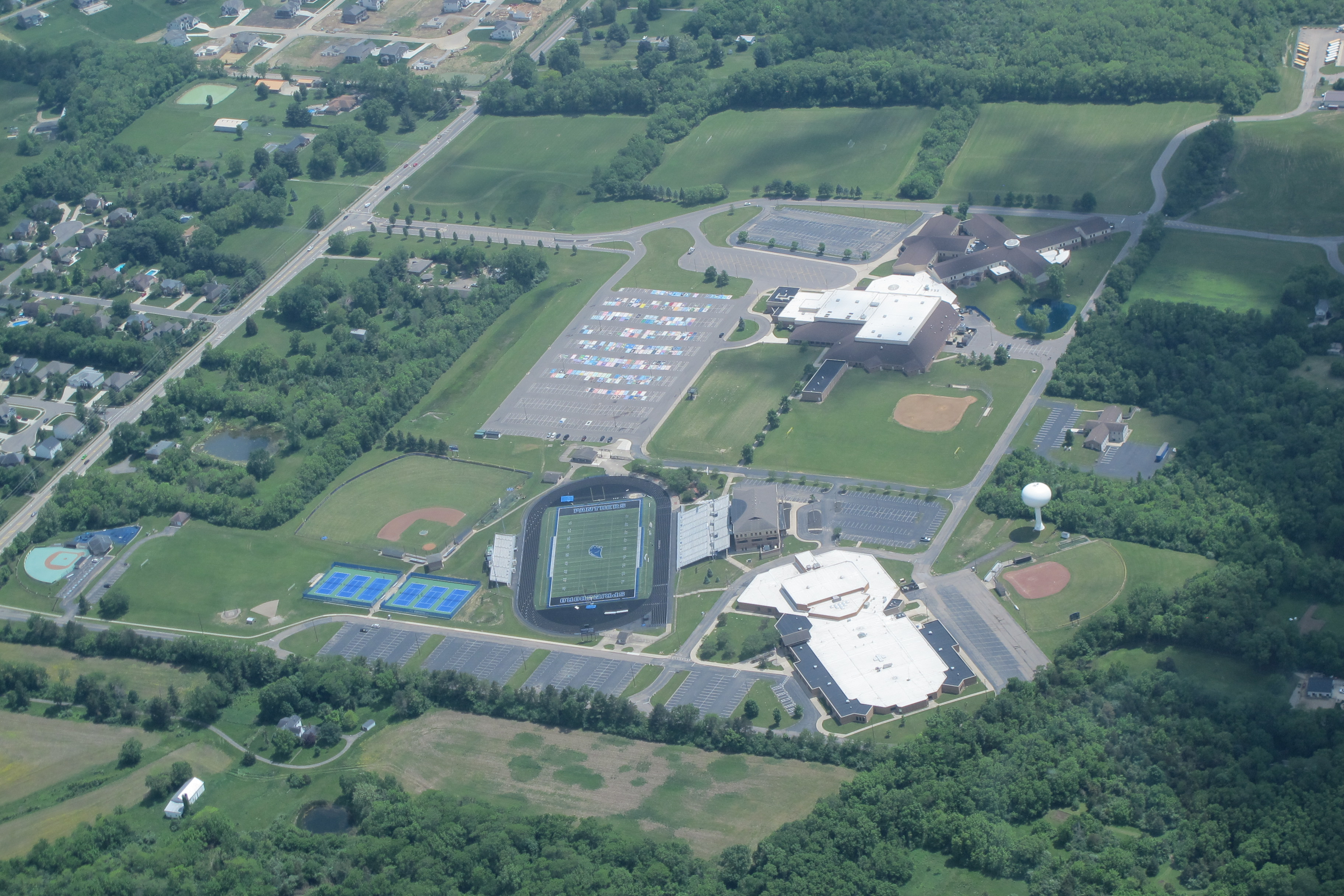
Springboro High School (Top), Junior High School (Bottom Right), and Careflight Field (Bottom Left). Taken from Alexander-Schleicher ASG 32 MI. 2024

=== State championships ===
- Girls soccer - 2024
- Boys cross country - 2026

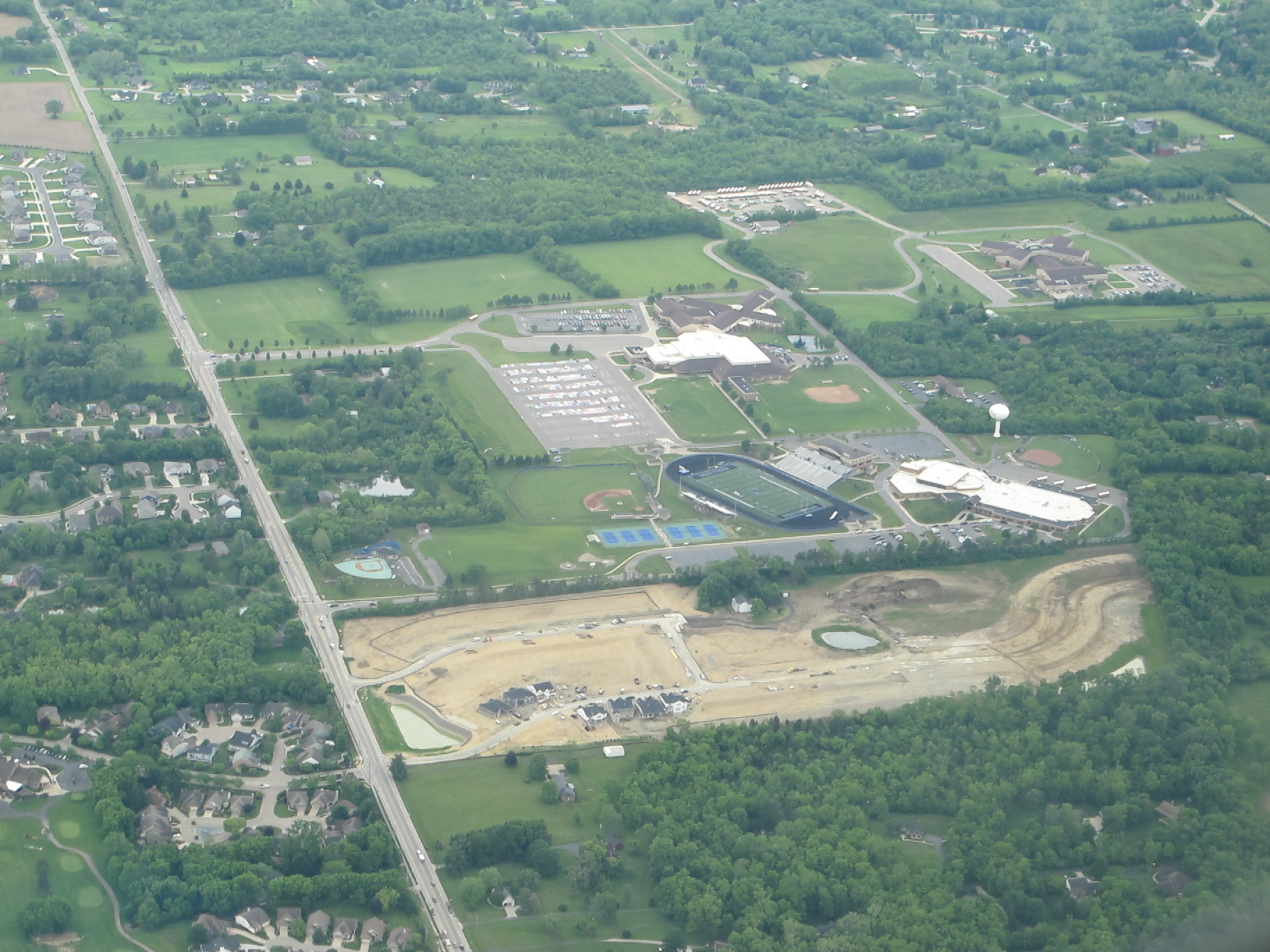
Springboro High School campus (2025). From bottom to top, Junior High/Careflight field, High School, Dennis Elementary. Taken from Glaser Dirks DG-1001M.

== Notable alumni ==
- Jake Ballard (2006), former NFL tight end
- Tony Campana (2004), former MLB outfielder
- A. J. Ewing (2023), MLB outfielder
- Jordan Hobbs (2021), WNBA third round draft pick
- Mark Johnson (2000), former MLB pitcher
- Ryan Johnson (2023), hammer thrower for Iowa Hawkeyes track and field, NCAA record holder in weight throw
- Tommy Kessler (2000), guitarist for Blondie
- Brad Lamb (1986), former NFL wide receiver
- Amy Tucker (1978), college basketball coach
