= Adja Kane =

French basketball player (born 2005)

No. 17 – SMU Mustangs
- Position: Center
- League: ACC

Personal information
- Born: 30 March 2005 (age 21) Orléans, France
- Listed height: 6 ft 3 in (1.91 m)

Career information
- College: SMU (2026–present)
- WNBA draft: 2025: 3rd round, 38th overall pick
- Drafted by: New York Liberty
- Playing career: 2023–present

Career history
- 2023–2026: Landerneau Bretagne Basket
- Stats at Basketball Reference
Medals
Women's basketball
Representing France
FIBA Under-17 World Cup
Bronze medal – third place	2022 Hungary	Team

Adja Kane (born 30 March 2005) is a French professional basketball player for the SMU Mustangs of the Atlantic Coast Conference.

== Playing career ==
On 14 June 2023, Kane signed with Landerneau Bretagne Basket of the LFB. During the 2023–24 season, in her first season with the club, she averaged 4.3 points, 3.8 rebounds, and 1.1 blocks per game. On 21 May 2024, she signed a one-year contract extension with Landerneau. During the 2024–25 season, she averaged 4.9 points and 4.0 rebounds, 1.1 assists, and 1.2 blocs per game. She ranked third in the league in blocked shots. During the 2025–26 season, she averaged 6.2 points, 5.2 rebounds and 1.2 blocks per game in 19 regular-season games.

On 14 April 2025, Kane was drafted in the third round, 38th overall, by the New York Liberty in the 2025 WNBA draft. On 3 April 2026, she was drafted 17th overall by the Toronto Tempo in the 2026 WNBA expansion draft.

On 21 April 2026, Kane announced on her Instagram that she would join the SMU Mustangs in the NCAA.

== National team career ==
Kane made her international debut for France at the 2022 FIBA Under-17 Women's Basketball World Cup. During the tournament she averaged 4.1 points, 5.6 rebounds and 1.4 assists per game and won a bronze medal.

She represented France at the 2024 FIBA U20 Women's EuroBasket where she averaged 5.4 points, 3.6 rebounds and 1.0 assists per game and won a gold medal.
