= Aicha Coulibaly =

Malian basketball player (born 2001)

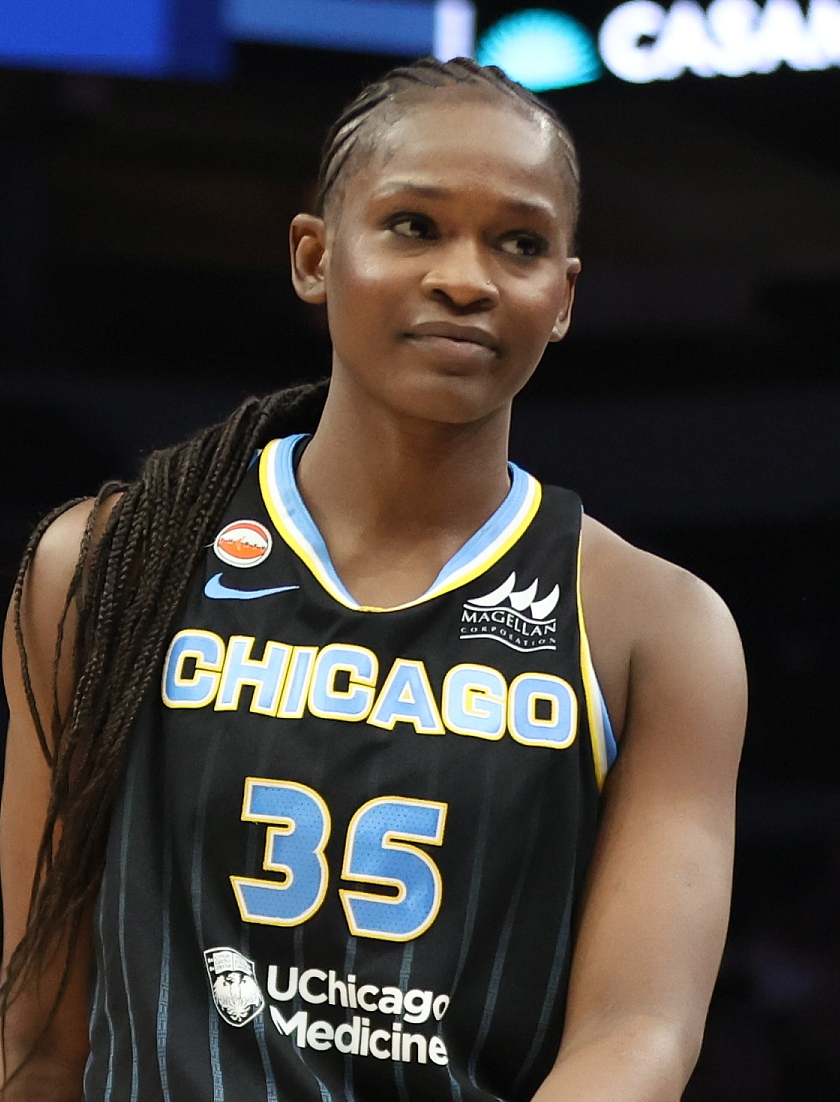
- Coulibaly with the Chicago Sky in 2026

No. 35 – Chicago Sky
- Position: Guard
- League: WNBA

Personal information
- Born: 18 October 2001 (age 25) Bamako, Mali
- Listed height: 6 ft 0 in (1.83 m)

Career information
- High school: IMG Academy (Bradenton, Florida)
- College: Auburn (2020–2023); Texas A&M (2023–2025)
- WNBA draft: 2025: 2nd round, 22nd overall pick
- Drafted by: Chicago Sky

Career history
- 2025–present: Chicago Sky

Career highlights
- 2× All-SEC Second Team (2022, 2023)
- Stats at Basketball Reference
Medals
Women's basketball
Representing Mali
FIBA Under-16 African Championship
Gold medal – first place	2017 Mozambique	Team

Aissetou Coulibaly (born 18 October 2001) is a Malian professional basketball player for the Chicago Sky of the Women's National Basketball Association (WNBA). She played college basketball at Auburn and Texas A&M.

== College career ==
=== Auburn ===
Coulibaly began her college basketball career at Auburn. During the 2020–21 season, in her freshman year, she appeared in 23 games, with seven starts, and averaged 5.1 points, 3.1 rebounds, 0.8 assists and 0.9 steals per game. During the 2021–22 season, in her sophomore year, she started all 28 games, and averaged 17.1 points, 7.5 rebounds, 1.6 assists and 2.2 steals in 32.4 minutes per game. She led Auburn in scoring, rebounding, steals and minutes played. On November 14, 2021, in a game against Old Dominion, she scored 17 points and 13 rebounds for her first career double-double. On November 26, 2021, in a game against Charleston Southern, she scored a then career-high 27 points. She finished fifth in the SEC in scoring, ninth in rebounding, and sixth in steals, and was named to All-SEC second team.

During the 2022–23 season, in her junior year, she appeared in 25 games, with 24 starts, and averaged 16.0 points, 6.5 rebounds, 2.7 assists and 2.2 steals per game. On January 22, 2023, in a game against Ole Miss, she scored a career-high 31 points. Following the season she was named to the to All-SEC second team for the second consecutive year.

=== Texas A&M ===
On 7 July 2023, Coulibaly transferred to Texas A&M. During the 2023–24 season, in her senior year, she started all 32 games, and averaged 13.6 points, 5.7 rebounds, 2.2 assists and 2.3 steals per game. On 8 March 2024, during the quarterfinals of the 2024 SEC women's basketball tournament against South Carolina, she scored a career-high 32 points. During the first round of the 2024 NCAA tournament, she scored all 26 of her points in the second half to overcome a 17-point deficit, and nearly upset Nebraska, losing the game 59–61.

During the 2024–25 season, as a graduate student, she appeared in 19 games and averaged 12.8 points, 5.0 rebounds, and 2.1 assists per game. On 26 January 2025, she suffered a season-ending knee injury in a game against LSU.

== Professional career ==
On 14 April 2025, Coulibaly was drafted in the second round, 22nd overall, by the Chicago Sky in the 2025 WNBA draft. However, her ACL tear prevented her from reporting to training camp or playing during the 2025 WNBA season.

On 13 April 2026, she signed a rookie-scale contract with the Sky, but was waived shortly after on 4 May. After clearing waivers, she rejoined the team three days later on a player development contract. After being activated 10 times during the Sky's first 18 games, and closing in on her 12-game limit as a development player, she signed a rest-of-season contract on 28 June.

== National team career ==
Coulibaly represented Mali at the 2017 FIBA U16 Women's African Championship where she averaged 21.8 points per game. During the final game against Angola she scored a game-high 25 points and six steals and won a gold medal. She was subsequently named to the all-tournament team and tournament MVP.

== Personal life ==
Coulibaly was born to Kadiatou Cisse and Youssouf Coulibaly, and has two siblings, Louti and Mariam.
