= Aaronette Vonleh =

American basketball player (born 2003)

Gernika KESB
- Position: Center
- League: Liga Femenina de Baloncesto

Personal information
- Born: July 7, 2003 (age 23) West Linn, Oregon, U.S.
- Listed height: 6 ft 3 in (1.91 m)

Career information
- High school: West Linn High School
- College: Arizona (2021-2022); Colorado (2022-2024); Baylor (2024-2025)
- WNBA draft: 2025: 3rd round, 31st overall pick
- Drafted by: Dallas Wings
- Playing career: 2025–present

Career history
- 2025–2026: Hozono Global Jairis
- 2026–present: Gernika KESB
- Stats at WNBA.com
- Stats at Basketball Reference

Aaronette Noelle Vonleh (born July 7, 2003) is an American professional basketball player for Gernika KESB in Spanish LF Endesa. She played college basketball for the Arizona Wildcats, Colorado Buffaloes, and Baylor Bears. Aaronette is the sister of NBA player Noah Vonleh.

== High school career ==
Vonleh was consitered a four-star recruit and the ninth ranked post player and 100th overall in the United States by ESPN. As a senior, Vonleh averaged 29.5 points, 9.8 rebounds, and 1.7 blocks per game (13 games played). On June 12, 2020, Vonleh committed to play at the University of Arizona.

== College career ==
=== Arizona ===
Vonleh appeared in 17 games as a true freshman. In the season opener vs. CSUN, she scored 14 points. She averaged 4.1 points and 1.6 rebounds in 6.9 minutes per game.

=== Colorado ===
As a sophomore Vonleh played 34 games and started in 33. She recorded her first double-double with 13 points and ten rebounds against Stanford on January 22, 2023. She averaged 12.2 points and 4.5 rebounds per game. She finished second in the Pac-12 and 18th in the NCAA shooting 58.5% from the field. Vonleh was a 2023 All-Pac-12 Honorable Mention and the 2023 Pac-12 Co-Most Improved Player.

As a junior, she started in all 34 games for the Buffs. She averaged 14.0 points and 5.1 rebounds per game. She had three double-doubles and scored double figures in 27 games. She had six games of 20 or more points. Vonleh was a 2024 Pac-12 All-Conference selection. On April 15, 2024, Vonleh entered the NCAA Transfer Portal. She committed to the Baylor Bears on April 24, 2024.

=== Baylor ===
Prior to the season, Vonleh was Preseason All-Big 12, names to the Lisa Leslie Preseason Watch List, and Preseason Big 12 Co-Newcomer of the Year.

As a senior, Vonleh averaged a career high 14.9 points and 5.8 rebounds per game. She appeared and started in all 36 contests. She scored double figures in 27 games. She scored a career high 37 points against Oklahoma State on March 8, 2025. Vonleh was named to the 2025 Big 12 All-Tournament Team and finished as a Second Team All-Big 12 selection.

== Professional career ==
On April 14, 2025, Vonleh was drafted by the Dallas Wings in the third round (31st overall) of the 2025 WNBA Draft. She signed a three-year $204,253 contract with the Wings on April 17, 2025. Vonleh was waived by the Wings on May 1, 2025.

For the remainder of 2025, Vonleh signed with Hozono Global Jairis. In January 2026, Vonleh signed with Lointek Gernika Bizkaia.
