= 2025 WNBA draft =

Basketball player selection

2025 WNBA Draft

General information
- Sport: Basketball
- Date: April 14, 2025
- Location: The Shed at Hudson Yards in Manhattan, New York
- Networks: U.S.: ESPN; Canada: TSN1/3/4/5, SN360, SNP
- Sponsored by: State Farm

Overview
- 38 total selections in 3 rounds
- League: Women's National Basketball Association
- Teams: 13
- Expansion team: Golden State Valkyries
- First selection: Paige Bueckers, Dallas Wings

The Women's National Basketball Association (WNBA)'s draft for the 2025 season was held following the 2024–25 NCAA Division I women's basketball season. It marked the first draft for the newest expansion team for the league, the Golden State Valkyries. The draft took place at The Shed in Manhattan and was televised on ESPN in the United States and on TSN1/3/4/5/SN360/SNP in Canada.

There were only 12 picks in the first round, as the Las Vegas Aces' pick was stripped for violating league rules regarding impermissible player benefits and workplace policies.

== Draft lottery ==
The lottery to determine the order of the top four picks in the 2025 draft took place on November 17, 2024. It was televised on ESPN in the United States and streamed on TSN+ in lieu of the TSN network due to the latter airing the Canadian Football League's 111th Grey Cup with Sportsnet in Canada. The four non-playoff teams in 2024 qualified for the lottery.

=== Lottery chances ===
The lottery odds were based on combined records from the 2023 and 2024 WNBA seasons. In the drawing, balls numbered 1–14 are placed in a lottery machine and mixed. Four balls are drawn to determine a four-digit combination (only 11–12–13–14 is ignored and redrawn). The team to which that four-ball combination is assigned receives the No. 1 pick. The four balls are then placed back into the machine and the process is repeated to determine the second pick. The two teams whose numerical combinations do not come up in the lottery will select in the inverse order of their two-year cumulative record. Ernst & Young knows the discreet results before they are announced. The order of selection for the remainder of the first round as well as the second and third rounds was determined by inverse order of the teams' respective regular-season records solely from 2024.

Note: Team selected for the No. 1 pick noted in bold text.

Team	Combined 2023–24 record	Lottery chances	Result
Los Angeles Sparks	25–55	44.2%	2nd pick
**Dallas Wings**	**31–49**	**22.7%**	**1st pick**
Chicago Sky	31–49	22.7%	3rd pick
Washington Mystics	33–47	10.4%	4th pick

== 2025 unofficial combine ==
On April 4, 2025 in Tampa, Florida, Intersport Basketball hosted their inaugural Lilly Women's College All-Star Combine, sponsored by Eli Lilly and Company and Herbalife. The event took place during the 2025 NCAA Final Four weekend. Thirty college basketball players with the intent to declare for the 2025 draft were invited to participate in the combine which included "interviews with team personnel, measurement and strength and condition, and on-court basketball drills." Scouts from the thirteen current WNBA teams were in attendance for the combine. The event was streamed live on YouTube.

The 2025 attendees were:

- Destiny Adams, Rutgers
- Julia Ayrault, Michigan State
- Lexi Donarski, North Carolina
- Kha'Dija Faye, Pittsburgh
- Allyson Fertig, Wyoming
- DeYona Gaston, Auburn
- O'Mariah Gordon, Florida State
- Zaay Green, Alabama
- Izzy Higginbottom, Arkansas
- Jordan Hobbs, Michigan
- Diamond Johnson, Norfolk State
- Jerkaila Jordan, Mississippi State
- Molly Kaiser, New Mexico State
- Dazia Lawrence, Kentucky
- Megan McConnell, Duquesne
- Esmeralda Morales, Montana State
- Lucy Olsen, Iowa
- Ugonne Onyiah, California
- Sammie Puisis, South Florida
- Kelsey Ransom, Georgetown
- Madison Scott, Ole Miss
- Shyanne Sellers, Maryland
- Jewel Spear, Tennessee
- Makayla Timpson, Florida State
- Kennedy Todd-Williams, Ole Miss
- Harmoni Turner, Harvard
- Alyssa Ustby, North Carolina
- Aaronette Vonleh, Baylor

== Eligibility and entrants ==
Under the collective bargaining agreement (CBA) between the WNBA and its players' union, draft eligibility for players (not defined as "international") requires the following to be true:

- The player's 22nd birthday falls during the calendar year of the draft. For the 2025 draft, the cutoff birth date is December 31, 2003.
- She has either:
  - completed her college eligibility;
  - received a bachelor's degree, or is scheduled to receive such in the three months following the draft; or
  - is at least four years removed from high school graduation.

=== Early eligibility ===
Players who are younger than the draft's cutoff age and are scheduled to receive their bachelor's degree within three months of the draft date will only be eligible if the calendar year of the draft is no earlier than the fourth year after their high school graduation.

Players with remaining college eligibility but who do meet the cutoff age criteria must notify WNBA headquarters of their intent to enter the draft no later than 10 days before the draft date, and must renounce any remaining college eligibility to do so. For the 2025 draft, the date fell on April 4. A separate notification timetable is provided for players involved in postseason tournaments (i.e. the NCAA Division I tournament); those players (normally) must declare for the draft within 24 hours of their final collegiate game.

=== International players ===
"International players" are defined as those for whom all of the following is true:

- Born and currently residing outside the U.S.
- Never "exercised intercollegiate basketball eligibility" in the U.S.
- The player's 20th birthday falls during the calendar year of the draft. For this draft, the international cutoff birth date is December 31, 2005.

== Declared players ==
The following players publicly declared for the 2025 draft: (Note: "Redshirt" refers to players who had and used an additional year of eligibility due to having a redshirt year during their college career.)

=== Age-eligible college underclassmen ===
- None

=== College seniors ===
- Paige Bueckers, UConn (redshirt)
- Sonia Citron, Notre Dame
- Madison Conner, TCU
- Jayda Curry, Louisville
- Sania Feagin, South Carolina
- Yaya Felder, Baylor
- Maria Gakdeng, North Carolina
- Melyia Grayson, Southern Miss (redshirt)
- Aubrey Griffin, UConn (redshirt)
- Bree Hall, South Carolina
- Jordan Hobbs, Michigan
- Kiki Iriafen, USC
- Liatu King, Notre Dame (redshirt)
- Aziaha James, NC State
- Dazia Lawrence, Kentucky (redshirt)
- Rayah Marshall, USC
- Megan McConnell, Duquesne
- Aneesah Morrow, LSU
- Lucy Olsen, Iowa
- Te-Hina Paopao, South Carolina
- JJ Quinerly, West Virginia
- Reigan Richardson, Duke
- Saniya Rivers, NC State
- Shyanne Sellers, Maryland
- Serena Sundell, Kansas State
- Taylor Thierry, Ohio State
- Makayla Timpson, Florida State
- Kennedy Todd-Williams, Ole Miss
- Harmoni Turner, Harvard
- Aaronette Vonleh, Baylor
- Chellia Watson, Buffalo (redshirt)
- Georgia Woolley, Syracuse

=== Graduate students ===
- Georgia Amoore, Kentucky
- Julia Ayrault, Michigan State (redshirt)
- Sarah Ashlee Barker, Alabama
- Kaitlyn Chen, UConn
- Taylen Collins, Auburn
- Aicha Coulibaly, Texas A&M
- Dalayah Daniels, Washington
- KK Deans, Ole Miss (redshirt)
- Kha'Dija Faye, Pittsburgh
- Yvonne Ejim, Gonzaga
- Zaay Green, Alabama (redshirt)
- Jillian Hayes, Cincinnati
- Madison Hayes, NC State
- Diamond Johnson, Norfolk State
- Taylor Jones, Texas
- Jerkaila Jordan, Mississippi State
- Deja Kelly, Oregon
- Koi Love, UT Arlington
- Deasia Merrill, TCU
- Aaliyah Nye, Alabama
- Ugonne Onyiah, California
- Sedona Prince, TCU
- Madison Scott, Ole Miss
- Alyssa Ustby, North Carolina
- Hailey Van Lith, TCU
- Talia von Oelhoffen, USC
- Maddy Westbeld, Notre Dame

=== International players ===
- Lea Bartelme, Slovenia
- Emma Čechová, Czech Republic
- Marine Dursus, France
- Justė Jocytė, Lithuania
- Adja Kane, France
- Anastasiia Kosu, Russia
- Dominique Malonga, France
- Ajša Sivka, Slovenia
- Annika Soltau, Germany

== Draft invitees ==
On April 11, 2025, the WNBA released the names of the sixteen players who were invited to attend the 2025 draft.

- (Australia) Georgia Amoore, Kentucky
- (United States) Sarah Ashlee Barker, Alabama
- (United States) Paige Bueckers, UConn
- (United States) Sonia Citron, Notre Dame
- (United States) Sania Feagin, South Carolina
- (United States) Kiki Iriafen, USC
- (United States) Aziaha James, NC State
- (France) Dominique Malonga, ASVEL Féminin
- (United States) Aneesah Morrow, LSU
- (United States) Te-Hina Paopao, South Carolina
- (United States) Saniya Rivers, NC State
- (United States) Madison Scott, Ole Miss
- (United States) Shyanne Sellers, Maryland
- (Slovenia) Ajša Sivka, Tarbes Gespe Bigorre
- (United States) Serena Sundell, Kansas State
- (United States) Hailey Van Lith, TCU

== Draft ==
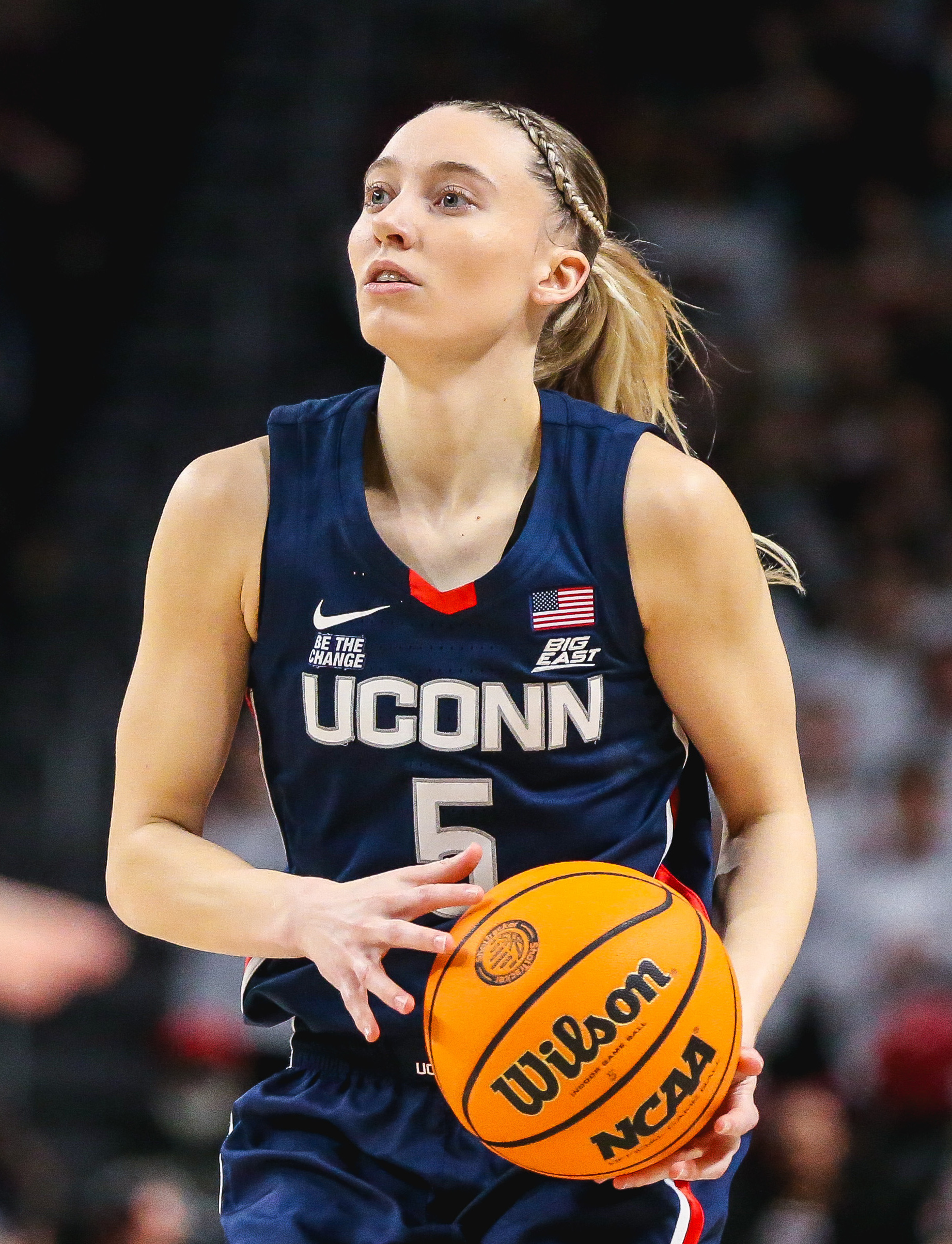
Paige Bueckers was selected 1st overall by the Dallas Wings.

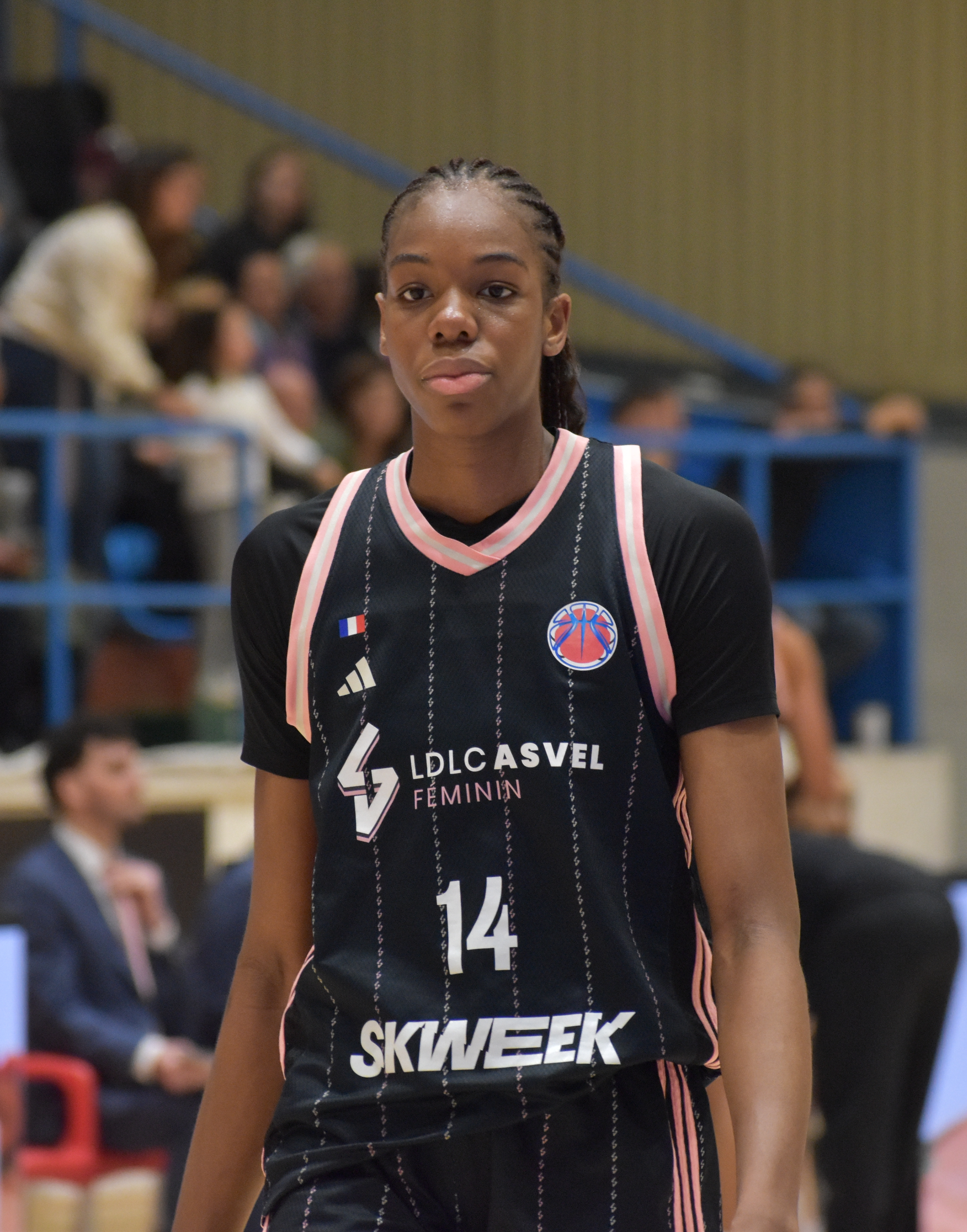
Dominique Malonga was selected 2nd overall by the Seattle Storm.

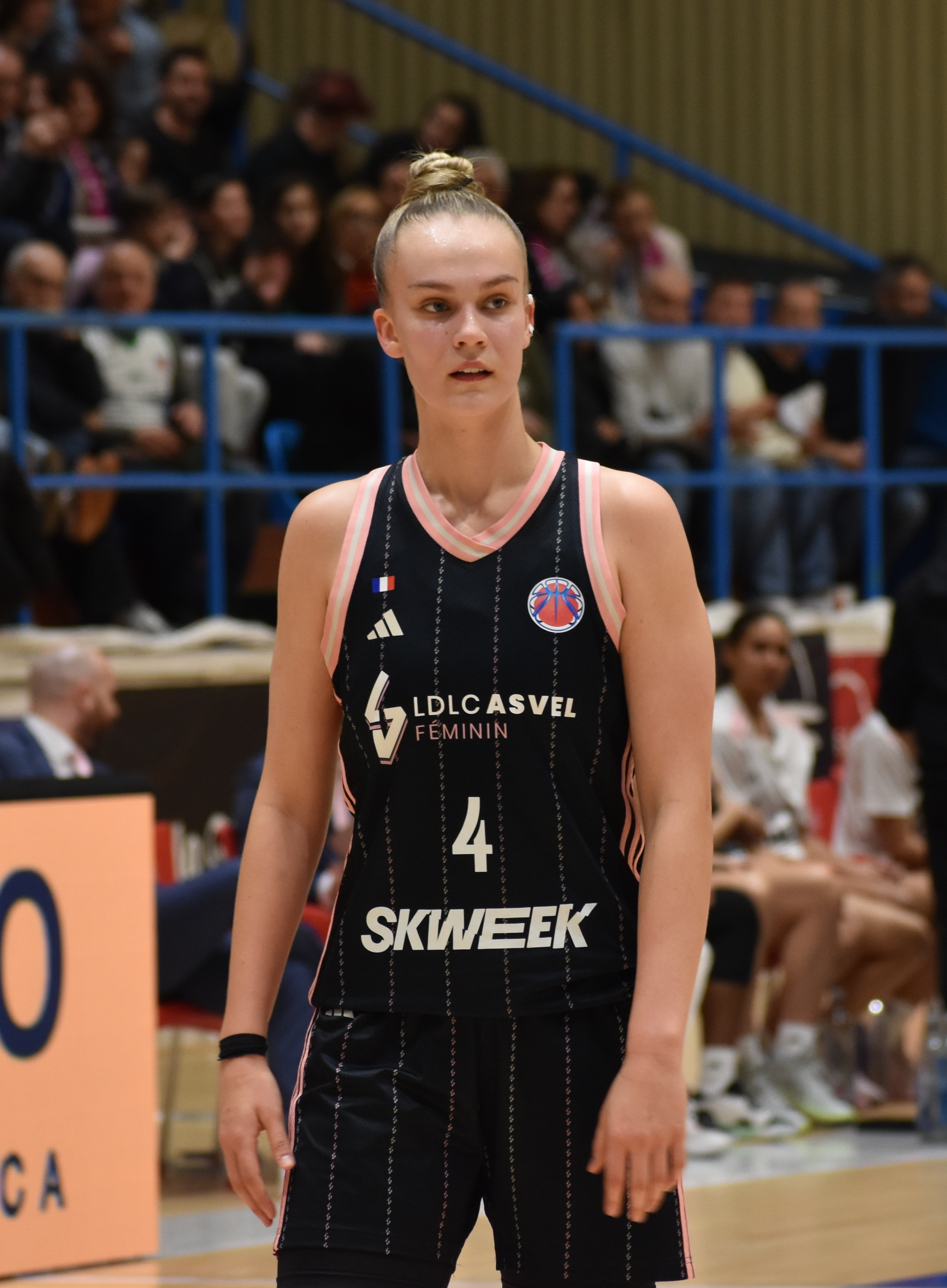
Justė Jocytė was selected 5th overall by the Golden State Valkyries.

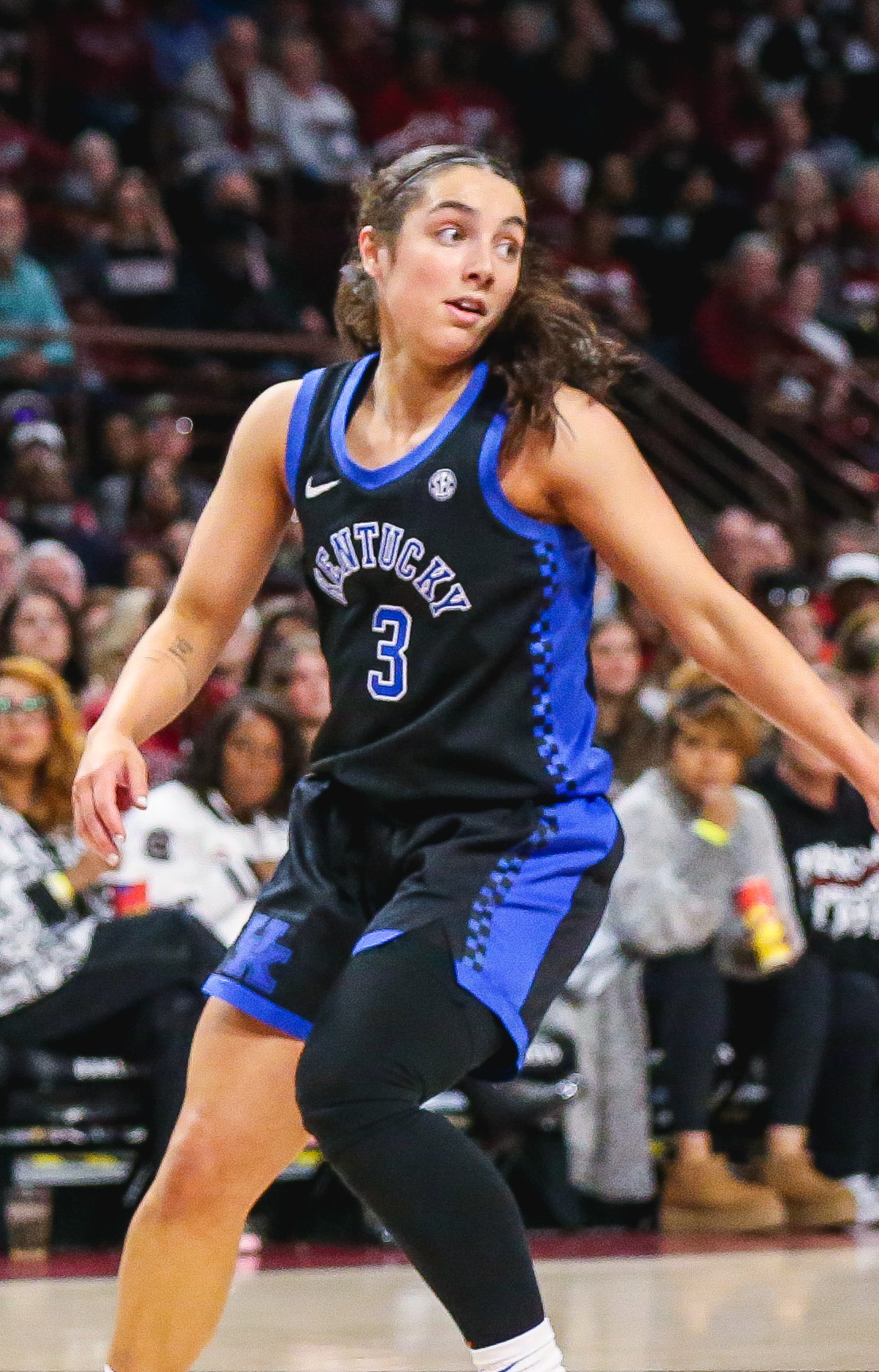
Georgia Amoore was selected 6th overall by the Washington Mystics.

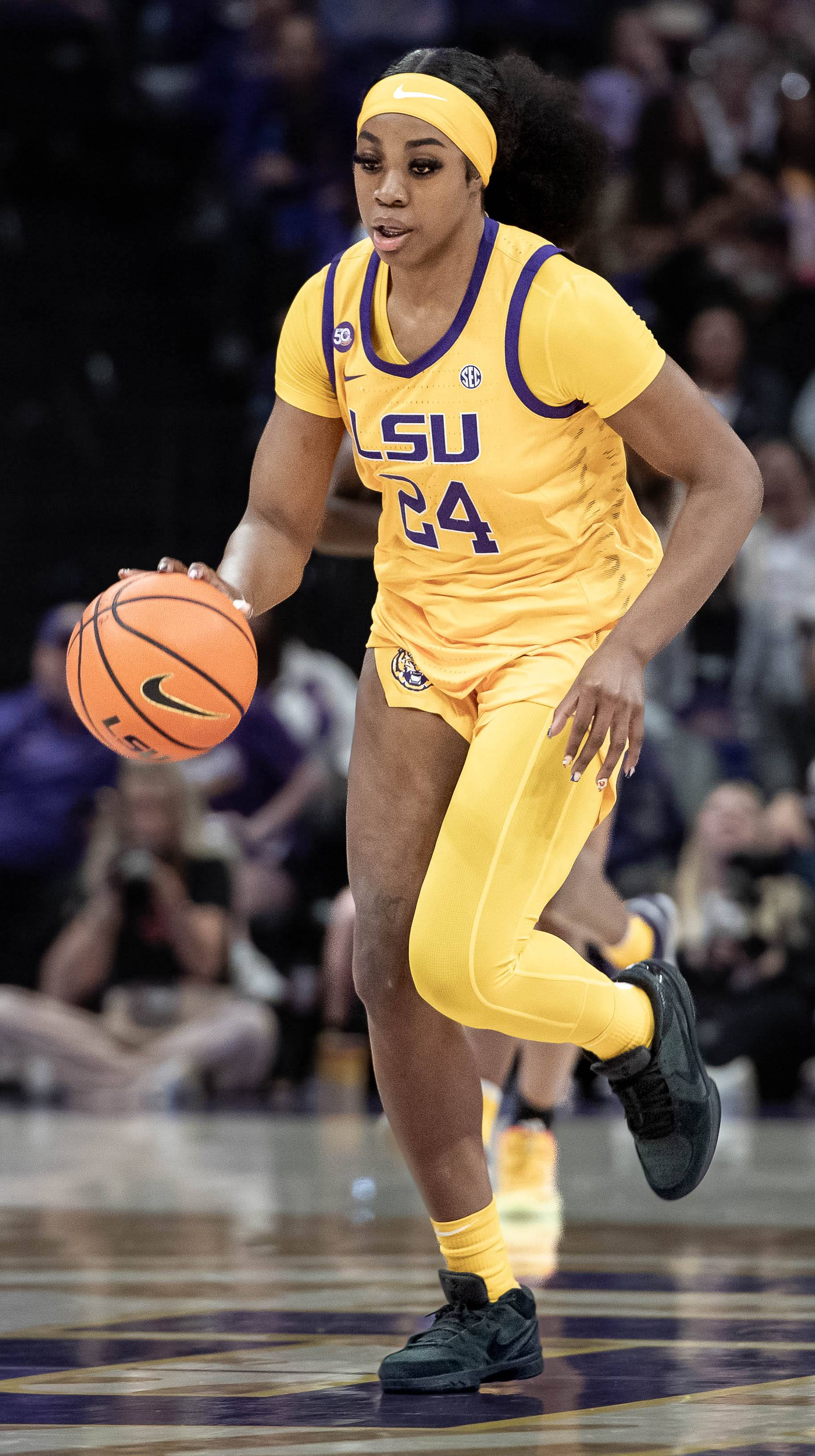
Aneesah Morrow was selected 7th overall by the Connecticut Sun.

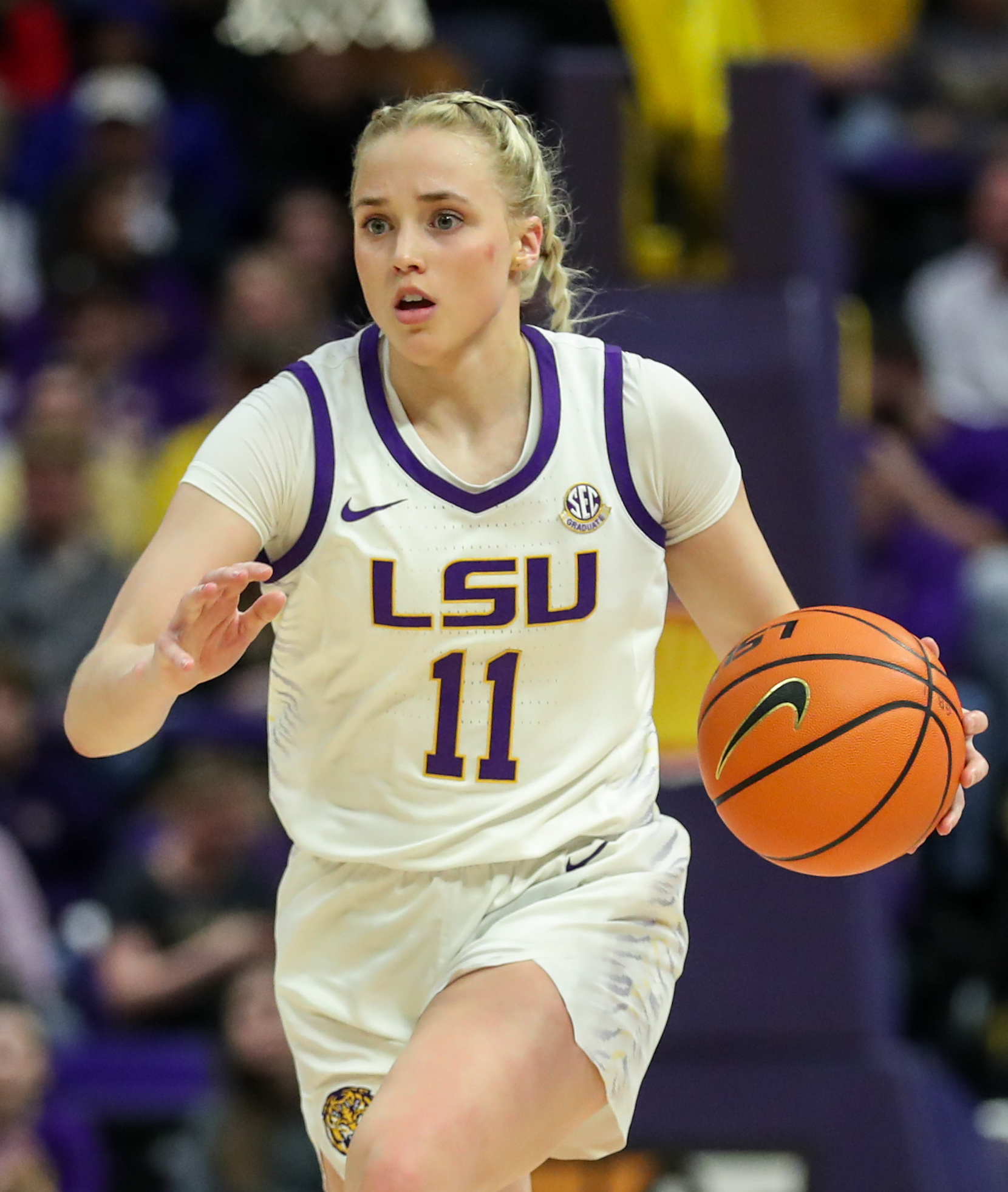
Hailey Van Lith was selected 11th overall by the Chicago Sky.

*	Denotes player who has been selected for at least one All-Star Game and All-WNBA Team
^{+}	Denotes player who has been selected for at least one All-Star Game
^{#}	Denotes player who never played in the WNBA regular season or playoffs
**Bold**	Denotes player who won Rookie of the Year

=== First round ===
Pick	Player	Nationality	Team	School / club team
1	**Paige Bueckers** *	United States	Dallas Wings	UConn
2	Dominique Malonga ^{+}	France	Seattle Storm (from Los Angeles) (Note: February 1, 2025: Three-team trade among Las Vegas, Los Angeles, and Seattle: Las Vegas acquired Jewell Loyd (from Seattle) and a 2025 second-round pick (from Los Angeles); Los Angeles acquired Kelsey Plum, 2025 first-round and 2026 second-round picks (from Las Vegas); Seattle acquired the rights to Li Yueru and a 2025 first-round pick (from Los Angeles), and a 2026 first-round pick (from Las Vegas))	ASVEL Féminin
3	Sonia Citron ^{+}	United States	Washington Mystics (from Chicago) (Note: February 23, 2025: Chicago to Washington: Chicago acquired Ariel Atkins; Washington acquired a 2025 first-round pick, a 2027 second-round pick, and the rights to swap 2027 first-round draft picks)	Notre Dame
4	Kiki Iriafen ^{+}	United States	Washington Mystics	USC
5	Justė Jocytė	Lithuania	Golden State Valkyries	ASVEL Féminin
6	Georgia Amoore	Australia	Washington Mystics (from Atlanta via Dallas) (Note: January 21, 2023: Atlanta to Dallas: Atlanta acquired Allisha Gray; Dallas acquired 2023 and 2025 first-round picks) (Note: April 10, 2023: Dallas to Washington: Dallas acquired the rights to Stephanie Soares; Washington acquired 2024 second-round and (from Atlanta) 2025 first-round picks)	Kentucky
7	Aneesah Morrow	United States	Connecticut Sun (from Phoenix via New York) (Note: February 11, 2023: Four-team trade among Chicago, Dallas, New York, and Phoenix: Chicago acquired Marina Mabrey and a 2024 second-round pick (from Phoenix); New York acquired rights to Leonie Fiebich, a 2024 second-round pick (from Chicago), and the right to swap 2025 first-round picks (from Phoenix); Phoenix acquired Michaela Onyenwere, 2024 third-round and 2025 second-round picks (from Chicago); Dallas acquired Diamond DeShields, 2023 and 2024 first-round picks, and the right to swap 2025 first-round picks (from Chicago)) (Note: March 16, 2025: New York to Connecticut: New York acquired Natasha Cloud; Connecticut acquired 2025 No. 7 draft pick and 2026 first round draft pick)	LSU
8	Saniya Rivers	United States	Connecticut Sun (from Indiana) (Note: February 2, 2025: Four-team trade among Connecticut, Dallas, Indiana, and Phoenix: Connecticut acquired Natasha Cloud, Rebecca Allen (from Phoenix), Jacy Sheldon (from Dallas), and a 2025 first-round pick (from Indiana); Dallas acquired DiJonai Carrington, Tyasha Harris, the right to swap 2026 second-round picks (from Connecticut), NaLyssa Smith, the right to swap 2027 third-round picks (from Indiana), the rights to Mikiah Herbert Harrigan, and a 2025 first-round pick (from Phoenix); Indiana acquired Jaelyn Brown (from Dallas), Sophie Cunningham, and a 2025 second-round pick (from Phoenix); Phoenix acquired Alyssa Thomas (from Connecticut), Satou Sabally, Kalani Brown, and Sevgi Uzun (from Dallas))	NC State
9	Sarah Ashlee Barker	United States	Los Angeles Sparks (from Seattle)	Alabama
Las Vegas Aces (forfeited due to league rules violations)
10	Ajša Sivka ^{#}	Slovenia	Chicago Sky (from Connecticut) (Note: July 17, 2024: Chicago to Connecticut: Connecticut acquired Marina Mabrey and a 2025 second-round pick; Chicago acquired Rachel Banham, Moriah Jefferson, a 2025 first-round pick, and the right to swap 2026 first-round picks)	Tarbes Gespe Bigorre
11	Hailey Van Lith	United States	Chicago Sky (from Minnesota) (Note: April 13, 2025: Minnesota to Chicago: Chicago acquired 2025 No. 11 draft pick; Minnesota acquired outright 2026 first-round draft pick)	TCU
12	Aziaha James	United States	Dallas Wings (from New York via Phoenix)	NC State

=== Second round ===
Pick	Player	Nationality	Team	School / club team
13	Aaliyah Nye	United States	Las Vegas Aces (from Los Angeles)	Alabama
14	Madison Scott	United States	Dallas Wings	Ole Miss
15	Anastasiia Kosu	Russia	Minnesota Lynx (from Chicago via 3 trades) (Note: February 6, 2024: Phoenix to Chicago: Phoenix acquired Kahleah Copper and Morgan Bertsch; Chicago acquired Brianna Turner, Michaela Onyenwere, 2024 and 2026 first-round picks, the right to swap 2026 second-round picks, and reacquired its own 2025 second-round pick) (Note: April 14, 2024: Chicago to Minnesota: Chicago acquired a 2024 first-round pick and Nikolina Milić; Minnesota acquired a 2024 first-round pick, Sika Koné, a 2025 second-round pick, and the right to swap 2026 first-round picks)	UMMC Ekaterinburg
16	Maddy Westbeld	United States	Chicago Sky (from Washington via Las Vegas) (Note: February 5, 2023: Washington to Las Vegas: Las Vegas acquired 2024 and 2025 second-round picks; Washington acquired the rights to Amanda Zahui B.) (Note: February 7, 2025: Las Vegas to Chicago: Chicago acquired 2025 second-round picks; Las Vegas acquired Dana Evans)	Notre Dame
17	Shyanne Sellers	United States	Golden State Valkyries	Maryland
18	Te-Hina Paopao	United States	Atlanta Dream	South Carolina
19	Makayla Timpson	United States	Indiana Fever (from Phoenix)	Florida State
20	Bree Hall	United States	Indiana Fever	South Carolina
21	Sania Feagin	United States	Los Angeles Sparks (from Seattle) (Note: February 14, 2025: Seattle to Los Angeles: Los Angeles acquired 2025 and 2027 second-round picks; Seattle acquired Lexie Brown and a 2025 third-round pick)	South Carolina
22	Aicha Coulibaly	Mali	Chicago Sky (from Las Vegas)	Texas A&M
23	Lucy Olsen	United States	Washington Mystics (from Connecticut) (Note: May 7, 2024: Connecticut to Washington: Washington acquired Bernadett Határ and a 2025 second-round pick; Connecticut acquired Queen Egbo)	Iowa
24	Dalayah Daniels ^{#}	United States	Minnesota Lynx	Washington
25	Rayah Marshall	United States	Connecticut Sun (from New York via Chicago) (Note: March 14, 2024: New York to Chicago: Chicago acquired 2025 and 2026 second-round picks; New York acquired Rebekah Gardner)	USC

=== Third round ===
Pick	Player	Nationality	Team	School / club team
26	Serena Sundell	United States	Seattle Storm (from Los Angeles)	Kansas State
27	JJ Quinerly	United States	Dallas Wings	West Virginia
28	Liatu King	United States	Los Angeles Sparks (from Chicago) (Note: February 19, 2024: Los Angeles to Chicago: Los Angeles acquired Julie Allemand, the rights to Li Yueru, and a 2025 third-round pick; Chicago acquired a 2024 first-round pick)	Notre Dame
29	Madison Conner ^{#}	United States	Seattle Storm (from Washington) (Note: May 11, 2024: Washington to Seattle: Seattle acquired a 2025 third-round pick; Washington acquired Jade Melbourne)	TCU
30	Kaitlyn Chen	United States	Golden State Valkyries	UConn
31	Aaronette Vonleh ^{#}	United States	Dallas Wings (from Atlanta) (Note: May 4, 2024: Atlanta to Dallas: Dallas acquired a 2025 third-round pick; Atlanta acquired Crystal Dangerfield)	Baylor
32	Zaay Green	United States	Washington Mystics (from Phoenix) (Note: August 20, 2024: Phoenix to Washington: Washington acquired Sug Sutton and a 2025 third-round pick; Phoenix acquired the rights to Klara Lundquist)	Alabama
33	Yvonne Ejim ^{#}	Canada	Indiana Fever	Gonzaga
34	Jordan Hobbs ^{#}	United States	Seattle Storm	Michigan
35	Harmoni Turner ^{#}	United States	Las Vegas Aces	Harvard
36	Taylor Thierry	United States	Atlanta Dream (from Connecticut) (Note: May 16, 2023: Connecticut to Atlanta: Connecticut acquired Leigha Brown; Atlanta acquired a 2025 third-round pick)	Ohio State
37	Aubrey Griffin	United States	Minnesota Lynx	UConn
38	Adja Kane ^{#}	France	New York Liberty	Landerneau Bretagne Basket
