= Ryan Johnson (hammer thrower) =

American hammer thrower

Personal information
- Born: 26 January 2005 (age 21)

Sport
- Sport: Athletics
- Events: Hammer throw, Weight Throw

Ryan Johnson (born 26 January 2005) is an American hammer thrower. In 2026, he set the American collegiate record in the weight throw competing for the University of Iowa. The throw also moved him to fourth on the world all-time list. He subsequently won the 2026 NCAA Indoor Championships.

== Biography ==
From Springboro, Ohio, Johnson attended Springboro High School. He then attended Eastern Michigan University before later transferring to the University of Iowa.

Competing for Eastern Michigan, Johnson won the 2024 Mid-American Conference Championships in the hammer throw with a best effort of 65.17 meters. He was subsequently named the MAC Freshman Field Performer of the Year. He won the USA U20 Championships in June 2024 in Eugene, Oregon, with a throw of 71.06 meters, winning the event by close to three feet. Johnson placed fourth in the hammer throw at the 2024 World Athletics U20 Championships in Lima, Peru in August, with his longest throw of 72.13 metres.

Having transferred to the University of Iowa, Johnson set a personal best 71.87 hammer throw at the Texas State Invitational in March 2025. The following month, he increased his personal best to 73.20 metres at the Musco Twilight meeting in Iowa City. In June, he had a sixty place finish in the hammer throw at the 2025 NCAA Division I Outdoor Track and Field Championships in Eugene, Oregon with a best throw of 71.91 metres.

Johnson won the weight throw title at the Hawkeye Invitational in January 2026, with a throw of 24.85 meters to set a meeting record and personal best. In February 2026 at the Big Ten Indoor Championships, Johnson moved to fourth on the world all-time list, and set a collegiate record in the weight throw. His effort of 25.66m broke the record of 25.58 metres set in 2015. Johnson won the weight throw at the 2026 NCAA Indoor Championships, throwing a meeting record 25.64 metres. Competing at the Drake Relays the following month, Johnson was fourth in the hammer throw with a mark of 75.89 m.
