= Laura Vikmanis =

American cheerleader

- Born: Laura Lynette Vikmanis; September 10, 1968 (age 57); Springboro, Ohio, U.S.
- Education: California State University, Long Beach
- Occupations: NFL Cheerleader, dietician, fitness trainer, and author
- Years active: 2009–2014
- Height: 5 ft 4 in (1.63 m)
- Parent(s): Linda Horn (mother); Juris Vikmanis (father)

Laura Lynette Vikmanis (previously Robb; born September 10, 1968) is an American dietitian, personal trainer, and dancer who was a professional cheerleader for the Cincinnati Ben–Gals, the cheerleading squad of the Cincinnati Bengals. She was the oldest cheerleader in National Football League history, at 40 years of age when she joined in 2009. She is also a co-author of the book It's Not About the Pom-Poms.

== Biography ==
Vikmanis is from Springboro, Ohio. As a child, Vikmanis danced for Dance Theater Dayton and attended John F. Kennedy Junior High School, where she was a member of the cheerleading squad. She attended Fairmont High School and was a member of the Fairmont Firebird Drill Team. She graduated from Fairmont High School in 1986. After high school, Vikmanis attended California State University, Long Beach where she received a Bachelor of Science in Dietetics and Food Administration. She is a certified dietitian and personal trainer. Although raised Presbyterian, she married a Roman Catholic, in a Catholic ceremony. They later had two daughters, who are both competitive cheerleaders. After filing for divorce, Vikmanis decided to pursue a career in professional cheerleading.

In 2018 Vikmanis spoke out against gender-based discrimination in the NFL.

== Career ==
Vikmanis works as a registered dietitian nutritionist for Kettering Health's Bariatric Surgery program. She works with pre and post bariatric surgery nutrition education, weight loss, weight management and cardiovascular nutrition. She has taught group fitness classes as well as private personal training sessions. Vikmanis made the squad in 2009. At the age of 39 she tried out for the Ben–Gals and made it to the finals cuts, but was not put on the team. She tried out again the following season and made the team. Since making the Ben–Gals, Vikmanis received huge publicity and has appeared on various television networks and talk shows. In March 2012, her book, co-written by Vikmanis and Amy Sohn, titled It's Not About the Pom-Poms was released. In 2012, Vikmanis would have been dethroned from the honor of being the oldest cheerleader in the league by Dallas Cowboys Cheerleader-hopeful Sharon Simmons, at 55, but Simmons was unable to make the squad. Vikmanis went on to be a member of the Ben–Gals squad for a total of six years.

=== Film ===
In 2011, New Line Cinema picked up the rights to make a film on Vikmanis' life story, though no film has been released as of 2021.
