= Jordan Hobbs =

American basketball player (born 2003)

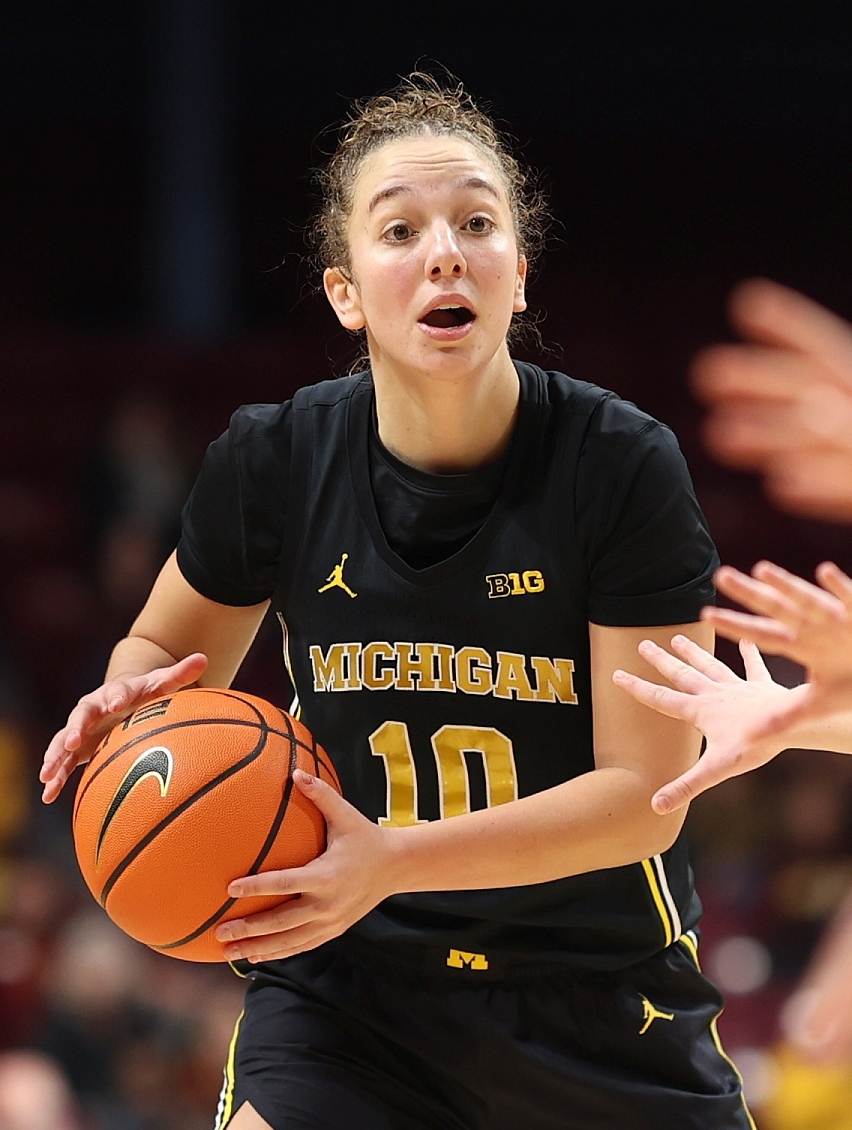
- Hobbs with Michigan in 2025

Personal information
- Born: September 8, 2003 (age 23) Springboro, Ohio, U.S.
- Listed height: 6 ft 3 in (1.91 m)

Career information
- High school: Springboro (Springboro, Ohio)
- College: Michigan (2021–2025)
- WNBA draft: 2025: 3rd round, 34th overall pick
- Drafted by: Seattle Storm
- Position: Guard
- Stats at Basketball Reference

Jordan Lynne Hobbs (born September 8, 2003) is an American professional basketball player. She played college basketball for the Michigan Wolverines. Hobbs was selected by the Seattle Storm in the 2025 WNBA draft.

== High school career ==
Hobbs attended Springboro High School in Springboro, Ohio. During her senior year, she averaged 17.6 points, 7.0 rebounds and 3.0 assists per game, leading Springboro to a district championship. On June 8, 2021, she signed her national letter of intent to play college basketball for the Michigan Wolverines.

== College career ==
Hobbs enrolled at the University of Michigan in 2021. As a freshman during the 2021–22 season, she appeared in 19 games off the bench and averaged 1.1 points in 4.9 minutes per game. As a sophomore during the 2022–23 season, she appeared in 30 games, with nine starts, and averaged 4.9 points and 1.9 rebounds in 15.1 minutes per game. On February 2, 2023, she made her first career start against Illinois, replacing the injured Laila Phelia.

As a junior during the 2023–24 season, she started all 34 games, and averaged 9.8 points, 4.2 rebounds and a team-best 3.0 assists in 29.0 minutes per game. She scored in double figures 19 times during the season. On December 10, 2023 against Illinois, she scored a then career-high 22 points.

As a senior during the 2024–25 season, she averaged 13.6 points, 4.8 rebounds and 2.6 assists in 31.4 minutes per game. She scored in double figures 26 times that season. On November 8, 2024 against Lehigh, she scored 17 points and had a career-high 11 rebounds, her first career double-double. During the quarterfinals of the 2025 Big Ten tournament against Maryland, she recorded 23 points, four rebounds, three assists and four steals to help Michigan advance to the semifinals. During the first round of the 2025 NCAA tournament against Iowa State, she scored a career-high 28 points. Following the season she was named an All-Big Ten honorable mention by both the media and coaches.

== Professional career ==
On April 14, 2025, Hobbs was selected with the 34th overall pick by the Seattle Storm in the third round of the 2025 WNBA draft. On May 7, 2025, Hobbs was cut by the Storm. She played the 2025-26 season with Alama San Martino di Lupari in the Italian Lega Basket Femminile. On April 17, 2026 the Chicago Sky announce they had signed Hobbs to a training camp contract.

== Career statistics ==
Legend
GP	Games played	GS	Games started	MPG	Minutes per game	RPG	Rebounds per game
APG	Assists per game	SPG	Steals per game	BPG	Blocks per game	PPG	Points per game
TO	Turnovers per game	FG%	Field-goal percentage	3P%	3-point field-goal percentage	FT%	Free-throw percentage
**Bold**	Career best	°	League leader

=== College ===
Year	Team	GP	GS	MPG	FG%	3P%	FT%	RPG	APG	SPG	BPG	TO	PPG
2021–22	Michigan	19	0	4.8	29.2	15.4	80.0	.3	.1	.2	–	**.2**	1.1
2022–23	Michigan	30	9	15.1	36.8	34.7	72.4	1.9	.8	.3	.1	1.0	4.9
2023–24	Michigan	**34**	**34**	28.9	42.0	**38.7**	80.9	4.2	**3.0**	.6	**.3**	1.8	9.8
2024–25	Michigan	**34**	**34**	**31.4**	**42.9**	33.9	**81.6**	**4.8**	2.6	**.7**	.2	2.5	**13.6**
**Career**		117	77	22.2	41.2	34.9	79.8	3.1	1.8	.5	.2	1.5	8.2
