= Anastasiia Kosu =

Russian basketball player (born 2005)

Anastasiia "Ola" Kosu
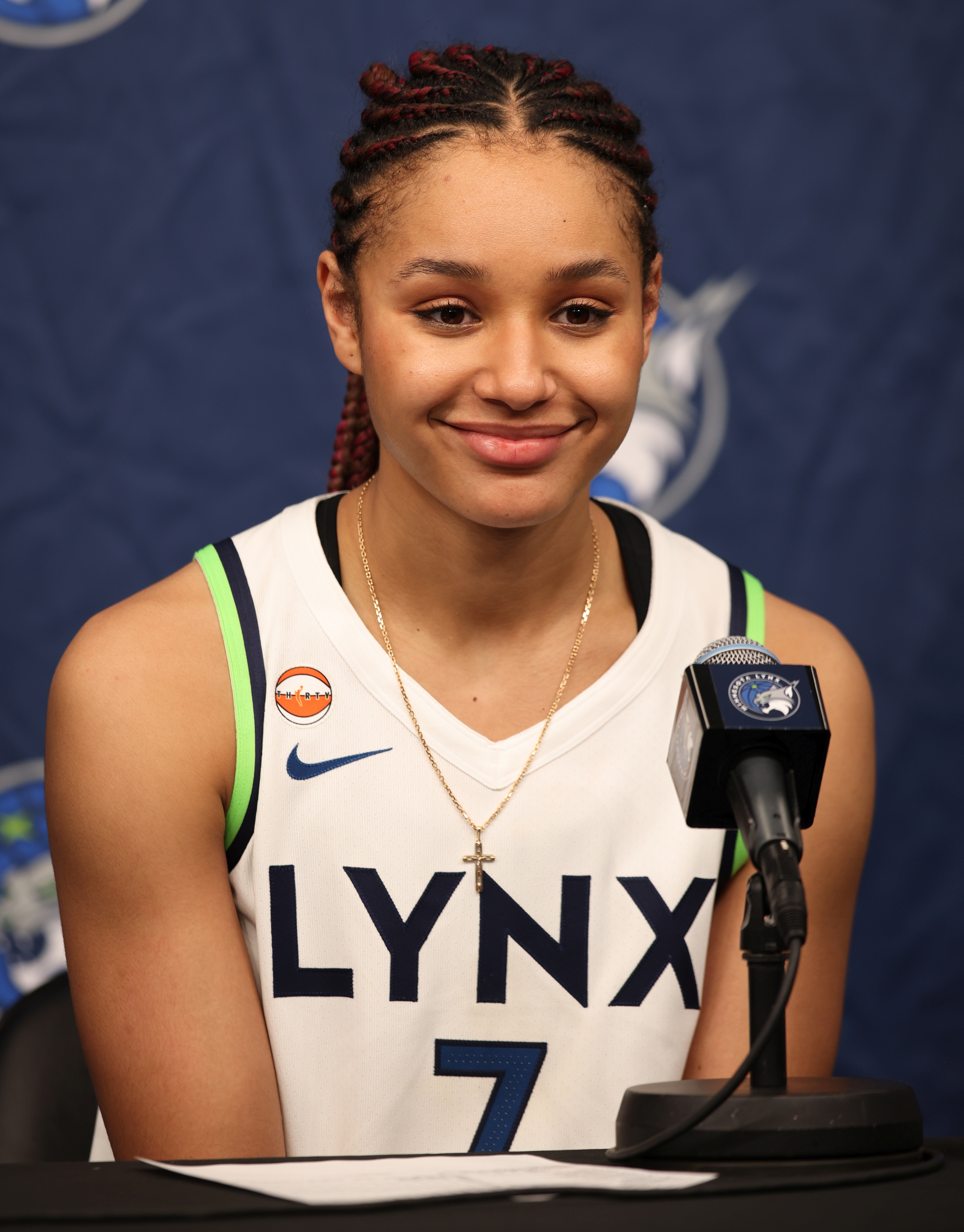
- Kosu in 2026

No. 7 – Minnesota Lynx
- Position: Forward
- League: WNBA

Personal information
- Born: 21 April 2005 (age 21) Kursk, Russia
- Listed height: 1.85 m (6 ft 1 in)
- Listed weight: 90.7 kg (200 lb)

Career information
- WNBA draft: 2025: 2nd round, 15th overall pick
- Drafted by: Minnesota Lynx
- Playing career: 2020–present

Career history
- 2020–2022: Dynamo Kursk
- 2022–2026: UMMC Ekaterinburg
- 2025–present: Minnesota Lynx
- Stats at Basketball Reference
Medals
Women's basketball
Representing Russia
FIBA Under-16 European Championship
Gold medal – first place	2019 North Macedonia	Team

Anastasiia Olairi "Ola" Kosu (born 21 April 2005) is a Russian professional basketball player for the Minnesota Lynx of the Women's National Basketball Association (WNBA) and for UMMC Ekaterinburg of the Russian Women's Basketball Premier League (RPL).

== Professional career ==
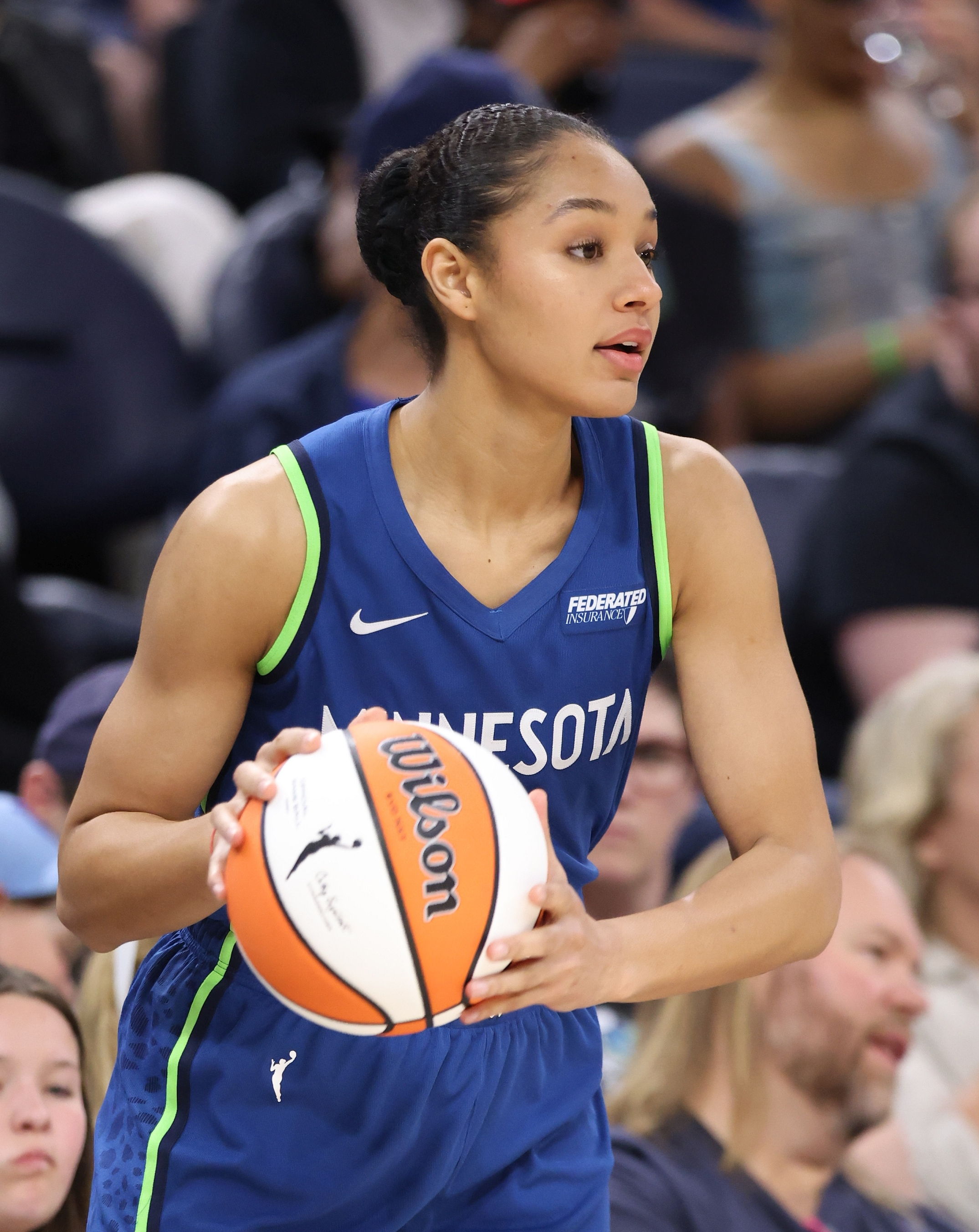
Kosu with the Minnesota Lynx in 2025.

Kosu began her career with Dynamo Kursk, where she played for two seasons, before the EuroLeague Women suspended the club in February 2022, following the Russian invasion of Ukraine. She made her EuroLeague debut on 4 December 2020, in a game against Perfumerías Avenida. She became one of the youngest players to ever appear in a EuroLeague game at 15 years, 7 months and 14 days old.

She then joined UMMC Ekaterinburg of the RPL. During the 2023–24 season, she was named Eurobasket.com's Player of the Year, Forward of the Year, Domestic Player of the Year, and named to the All-Russian PBL First Team. On 14 August 2024, she re-signed with Ekaterinburg. She helped lead UMMC to three consecutive Russian Championships from 2023 to 2025.

On 14 April 2025, she was drafted in the second round, 15th overall, by the Minnesota Lynx in the 2025 WNBA draft. She made her WNBA preseason debut for the Lynx on 6 May 2025, during a game against the Chicago Sky, and scored four points and four rebounds. She made her regular season debut for the Lynx on 16 May 2025, during a game against the Dallas Wings.

== National team career ==
At 14 years old, Kosu represented Russia at the 2019 FIBA U16 Women's European Championship where she averaged 18.0 points and 15.0 rebounds in seven games. During the championship game against Lithuania, she scored 27 points and 14 rebounds to help Russia win a gold medal. She was subsequently named to the All-Tournament team and tournament MVP.

She represented Russia at the 2021 FIBA Under-19 Women's Basketball World Cup, where she led her team in scoring, and averaged a double-double of 15.7 points and 12.8 rebounds per game. On 8 August 2021, in a game against Hungary, she scored 20 points and 20 rebounds, becoming the seventh player to record a 20-point, 20-rebound double-double at the FIBA Under-19 Women's Basketball World Cup.

== Personal life ==
Kosu's father was originally from Nigeria and was a professional basketball player in Spain. He died when Kosu was six years old.

== Career statistics ==
Legend
GP	Games played	GS	Games started	MPG	Minutes per game	RPG	Rebounds per game
APG	Assists per game	SPG	Steals per game	BPG	Blocks per game	PPG	Points per game
TO	Turnovers per game	FG%	Field-goal percentage	3P%	3-point field-goal percentage	FT%	Free-throw percentage
**Bold**	Career best	°	League leader

=== WNBA ===
==== Regular season ====
Stats current through end of 2025 season

WNBA regular season statistics
Year	Team	GP	GS	MPG	FG%	3P%	FT%	RPG	APG	SPG	BPG	TO	PPG
2025	Minnesota	21	0	3.8	.448	0.0	.600	0.7	0.2	0.0	0.2	0.3	1.7
**Career**	1 year, 1 team	21	0	3.8	.448	0.0	.600	0.7	0.2	0.0	0.2	0.3	1.7

=== Playoffs ===
WNBA playoff statistics
Year	Team	GP	GS	MPG	FG%	3P%	FT%	RPG	APG	SPG	BPG	TO	PPG
2025	Minnesota	3	0	2.3	1.000	—	—	0.3	0.3	—	—	—	2.0
**Career**	1 year, 1 team	3	0	2.3	1.000	—	—	0.3	0.3	—	—	—	2.0
