= Amy Sohn =

American author

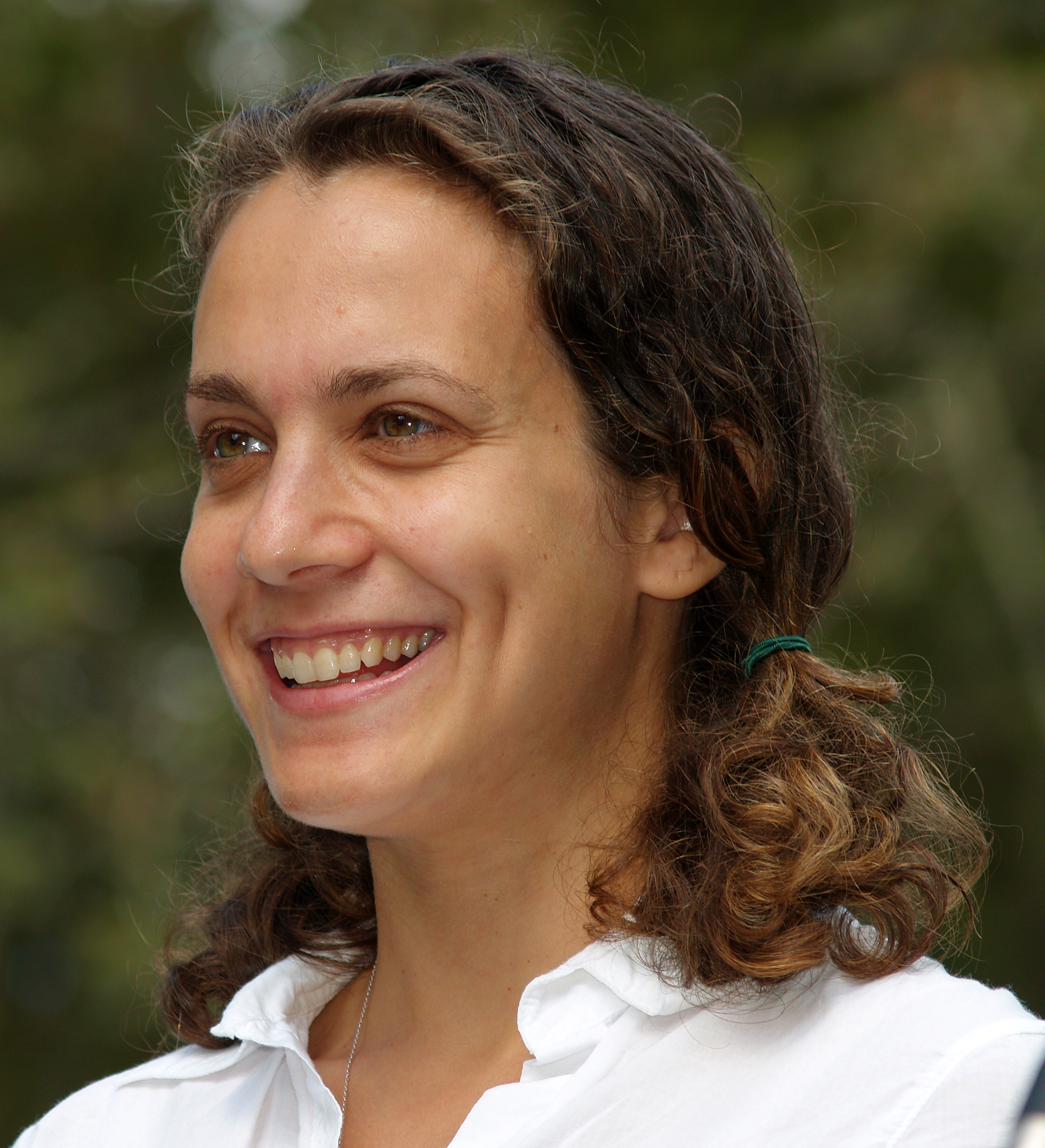
- Sohn in 2009
- Born: United States
- Education: Brown University
- Occupations: Author, screenwriter
- Writing career
- Language: English
- Genres: Fiction, non-fiction
- Notable work: The Man Who Hated Women

Amy Sohn is a Brooklyn-based author, columnist and screenwriter. Her first two novels were Run Catch Kiss (1999) and My Old Man (2004), both published by Simon & Schuster, and a companion guide to television's Sex and the City, Sex and the City: Kiss and Tell (Pocket Books).

== Early life ==
She graduated from Hunter College High School in 1991 and Brown University with an A.B. in 1995.

== Career ==
Sohn's novels include Prospect Park West (2009) and its sequel Motherland (2012), about four women who live in the Park Slope neighborhood of Brooklyn. In 2014, she published The Actress (Simon & Schuster), which Slate called "a valuable contribution to the canon of Hollywood fiction—a canon which is actually, incredibly, more sorely lacking strong female points of view than even Hollywood movies.”

She was a contributing editor at New York magazine, where she wrote the weekly "Mating" column. From 1996 to 1999, she wrote a dating column, "Female Trouble", for New York Press. Her articles and reviews have also appeared in The Nation, Playboy, Harper's Bazaar, Men's Journal and The New York Times Book Review. In 2012, she cowrote the book It's Not About the Pom-Poms with Laura Vikmanis.

She wrote the films Pagans, which is in post-production, and Spin the Bottle, available through TLA Releasing. She cocreated, wrote and starred in the Oxygen television series Avenue Amy and appears on television as a pundit on popular culture.

In 2022, she became a press secretary for New York City Mayor Eric Adams.

=== Works ===
Novels

- Run Catch Kiss. Simon & Schuster, 1999.
- My Old Man. Simon & Schuster, 2004.
- Prospect Park West. Simon & Schuster, 2009.
- Motherland. Simon & Schuster, 2012.
- The Actress. Simon & Schuster, 2014.
- CBD! OR Books, 2019.
- Brooklyn Bailey, the Missing Dog. Dial Books, 2020.

Screenplays

- Spin the Bottle. 1998.
- Pagans. 2004.

Non-fiction

- The Man Who Hated Women: Sex, Censorship, and Civil Liberties in the Gilded Age. Farrar, Straus and Giroux, 2021.
