= Madison Scott =

American basketball player

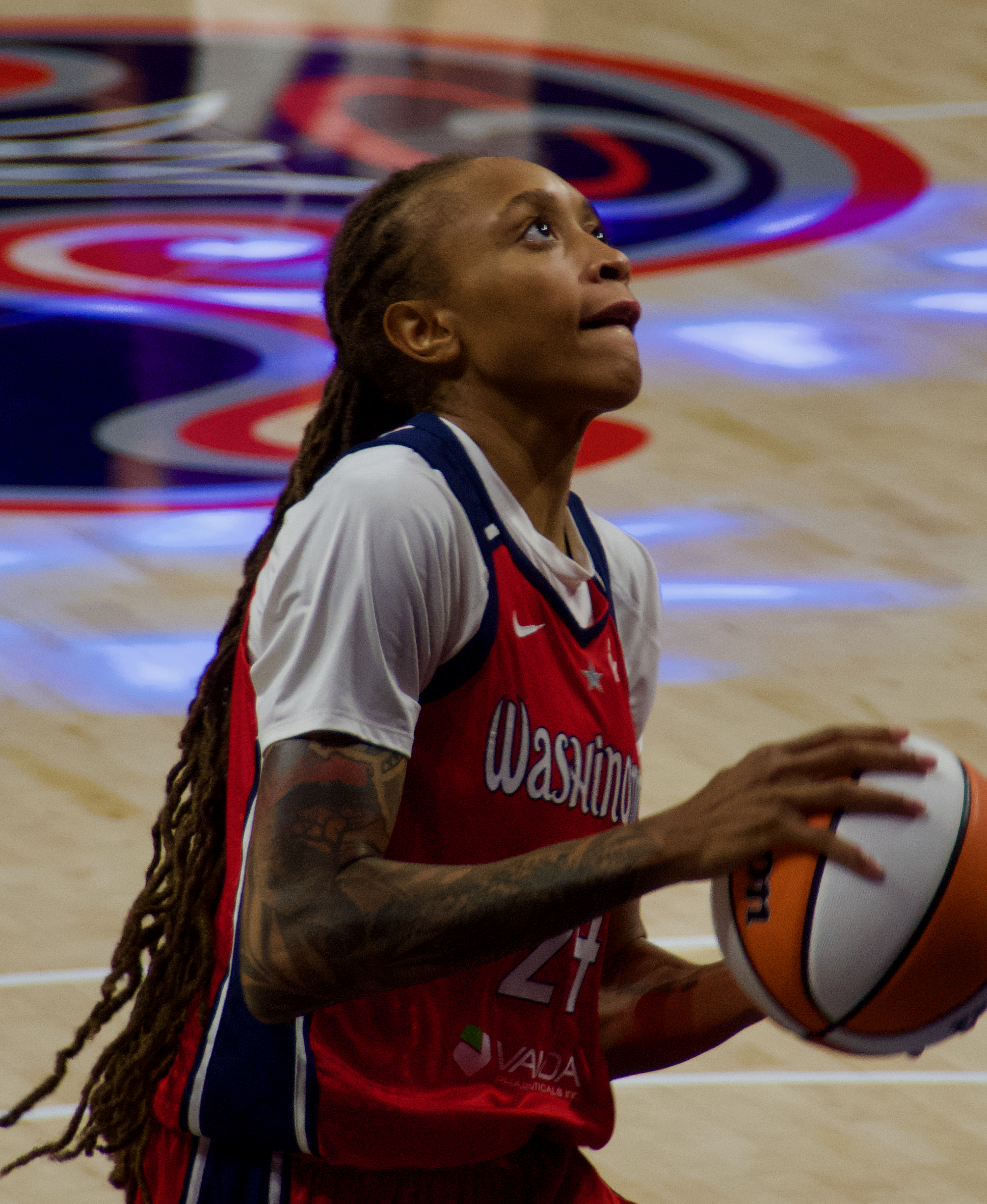
- Scott with Washington Mystics in 2025

No. 10 – New York Liberty
- Position: Forward
- League: WNBA

Personal information
- Born: December 27, 2001 (age 24) Indian Head, Maryland, U.S.
- Listed height: 6 ft 2 in (1.88 m)

Career information
- High school: Bishop McNamara (Forestville, Maryland)
- College: Ole Miss (2020–2025)
- WNBA draft: 2025: 2nd round, 14th overall pick
- Drafted by: Dallas Wings
- Playing career: 2025–present

Career history
- 2025: Washington Mystics
- 2025–present: Geas Basket
- 2026–present: New York Liberty

Career highlights
- First-team All-SEC (2024); 2× SEC All-Defensive Team (2023, 2024); SEC Freshman of the Year (2021); SEC All-Freshman Team (2021); McDonald's All-American (2020)
- Stats at Basketball Reference

Madison Scott (born December 27, 2001) is an American professional basketball player for the New York Liberty of the Women's National Basketball Association (WNBA) and for Geas Basket of the Lega Basket Femminile. She played college basketball at Ole Miss. She was selected 14th overall by the Dallas Wings in the 2025 WNBA draft.

== College career ==
Scott was the fifteenth ranked player in the nation in the 2020 recruiting class and the second ranked wing player. She was also a 2020 McDonald's High School All-American. She signed with Ole Miss as the first McDonald's All-American to join the program. She was named SEC Freshman of the Year in 2021, becoming the fourth Rebel to win the award and the first since Armintie Price in 2004. She was later named to the SEC second team and all-defensive in her junior year and SEC first team and all-defensive teams in her senior season.

== Professional career ==
=== WNBA ===
On April 14, 2025, Scott was selected 14th overall by the Dallas Wings in the 2025 WNBA draft. On May 11, she was waived by the Wings, before the regular season began on May 16.

==== Washington Mystics (2025-2026) ====
On August 14, 2025, Scott signed a seven-day contract with the Washington Mystics. She made her debut on August 15 in an 88–84 win over the Indiana Fever, playing 6 minutes off the bench, including the final seconds of a one-possession game. She eventually finished the season with the Mystics, appearing in 9 games and averaging 1.6 points in 5.2 minutes per game.

Scott attended the Mystics training camp in April and May of 2026, but the team waived her on May 6, 2026 before the start of the regular season. She played in the teams' two preseason games.

==== New York Liberty (2026) ====
On September 3, 2026, the New York Liberty announced that they had signed Scott to a developmental player contract.

=== Overseas ===
Scott signed with Geas Basket of the Lega Basket Femminile for the 2025–26 season.

== Career statistics ==
Legend
GP	Games played	GS	Games started	MPG	Minutes per game	RPG	Rebounds per game
APG	Assists per game	SPG	Steals per game	BPG	Blocks per game	PPG	Points per game
TO	Turnovers per game	FG%	Field-goal percentage	3P%	3-point field-goal percentage	FT%	Free-throw percentage
**Bold**	Career best	°	League leader

=== WNBA ===
==== Regular season ====
WNBA regular season statistics
Year	Team	GP	GS	MPG	FG%	3P%	FT%	RPG	APG	SPG	BPG	TO	PPG
2025	Washington	**9**	0	**5.2**	.455	.000	**1.000**	**.1**	.2	**.2**	.0	**.1**	1.6
2026	New York	2	0	3.0	**1.000**	—	.000	.0	**.5**	.0	.0	.0	**2.0**
**Career**	2 years, 2 teams	11	0	4.8	.538	.000	.800	.1	.3	.2	.0	.1	1.6

=== College ===
Year	Team	GP	GS	MPG	FG%	3P%	FT%	RPG	APG	SPG	BPG	TO	PPG
2020–21	Ole Miss	24	20	24.6	**.539**	.000	.673	7.1	1.0	.9	**1.0**	**1.4**	9.6
2021–22	Ole Miss	32	32	26.1	.486	.000	.654	6.9	1.4	**1.3**	.9	2.1	9.6
2022–23	Ole Miss	**34**	**34**	29.5	.510	.000	.664	**8.0**	2.1	1.1	.9	2.1	11.6
2023–24	Ole Miss	32	31	**31.0**	.490	.222	.708	6.4	3.4	.8	.6	2.4	**12.8**
2024–25	Ole Miss	33	32	29.4	.466	**.235**	**.737**	5.1	**3.7**	1.0	.9	1.8	11.8
**Career**		155	149	28.3	.493	.214	.687	6.7	2.4	1.0	.9	2.0	11.1

== Personal life ==
Scott's grandmother is Pamela E. Queen, a Democratic member of the Maryland House of Delegates. Scott is a member of Sigma Gamma Rho Sorority, Inc.
