= Te-Hina Paopao =

American basketball player (born 2002)

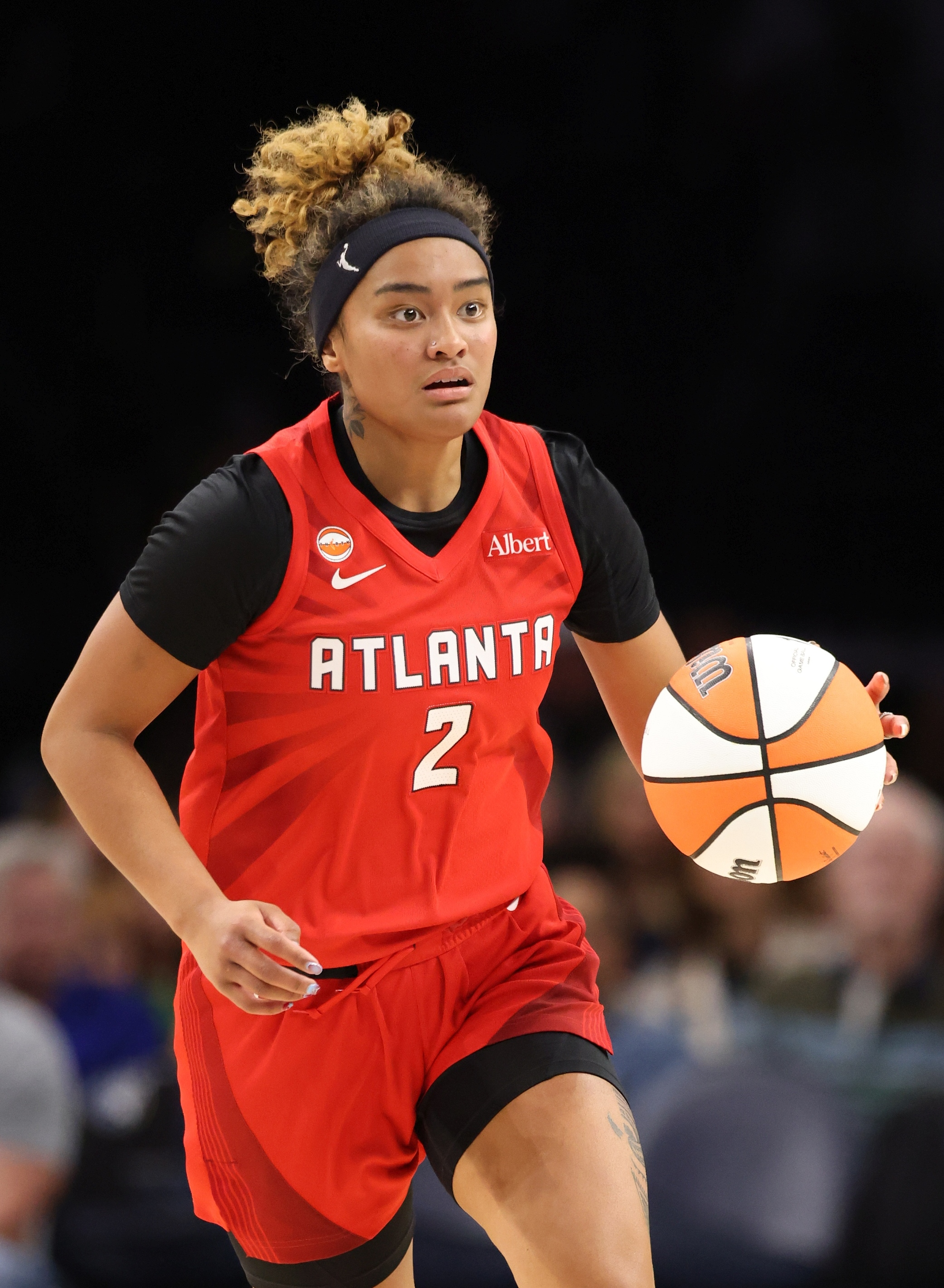
- Paopao with the Atlanta Dream in 2026

No. 2 – Atlanta Dream
- Position: Guard
- League: WNBA

Personal information
- Born: August 21, 2002 (age 24) Oceanside, California, U.S.
- Listed height: 5 ft 9 in (1.75 m)

Career information
- High school: La Jolla Country Day (La Jolla, California)
- College: Oregon (2020–2023); South Carolina (2023–2025)
- WNBA draft: 2025: 2nd round, 18th overall pick
- Drafted by: Atlanta Dream
- Playing career: 2025–present

Career history
- 2025–present: Atlanta Dream

Career highlights
- NCAA champion (2024); Second-team All-American – USBWA (2024); Second-team All-SEC (2024); 2× All-Pac-12 Team (2021, 2022); Pac-12 All-Freshman Team (2021); McDonald's All-American (2020); California Ms. Basketball (2020)
- Stats at Basketball Reference
Medals
Women's basketball
Representing the United States
FIBA Under-19 World Cup
| Gold medal – first place | 2021 Hungary | Team |

Te-Hina Olive-Talaave Paopao (born August 21, 2002) is an American professional basketball player for the Atlanta Dream of the Women's National Basketball Association (WNBA). She played college basketball at South Carolina and Oregon.

== High school career ==
Paopao played basketball for La Jolla Country Day School in La Jolla, San Diego, California. As a 10 year old, Paopao was the starting point guard for a U16 team. When she was 14 years old, Kelsey Plum said of Paopao, "She's just never scared. It's like a fearlessness but a confidence that she has... I think she could start in the Pac-12 right now... Honestly, I think she could be the best to come out of San Diego." Plum would often invite Paopao to train with her, stating "Even to this day, when I go back, that's the only kid I would let work out with me, because she can hang with the intensity... She pushes me because I'm like, 'I can't let a 12-year-old beat me in this shooting drill."

However, she suffered a torn ACL in each of her first two high school seasons.

As a senior, Paopao averaged 22.7 points, 8 rebounds, 4.3 assists and 3.3 steals per game. She led her team to a 32–1 record and the Southern California Open Division regional title, but the state championship game was canceled due to the COVID-19 pandemic. Paopao received McDonald's All-American honors and was named California Gatorade Player of the Year and California Ms. Basketball. Rated a five-star recruit by ESPN, she committed to playing college basketball for Oregon over offers from California, Oregon State and UCLA, among other programs.

== College career ==
Paopao entered her freshman season as Oregon's starting point guard, replacing Sabrina Ionescu. Kelly Graves, head coach of Oregon, had high praise for her: “I think Te-Hina is next in the line of those guards that we’ve had that can just fill up the stat sheet. She’s a good rebounder, an excellent passer, an elite-level shooter,” Graves said. “I’m not saying she’s another Sabrina, but she’s got the ability to impact the game in multiple ways like Sabrina did.” She had chosen Oregon over other programs because Oregon had not stopped recruiting her amidst the injuries she faced through high school. She was part of the top-recruiting class, being one of the five five-start recruits, dubbed the "Fab Five".

As a freshman, she started all games played and averaged 10.2 points, 4.4 assists and 3.2 rebounds per game, missing her last five games with a foot injury. Paopao earned All-Pac-12 honors and All-Freshmen selection - being one of only two players in the league to earn both honors. She also led all NCAA freshmen with a 2.40 assist-to-turnover ratio while ranking fourth in the Pac-12 in assists per game.

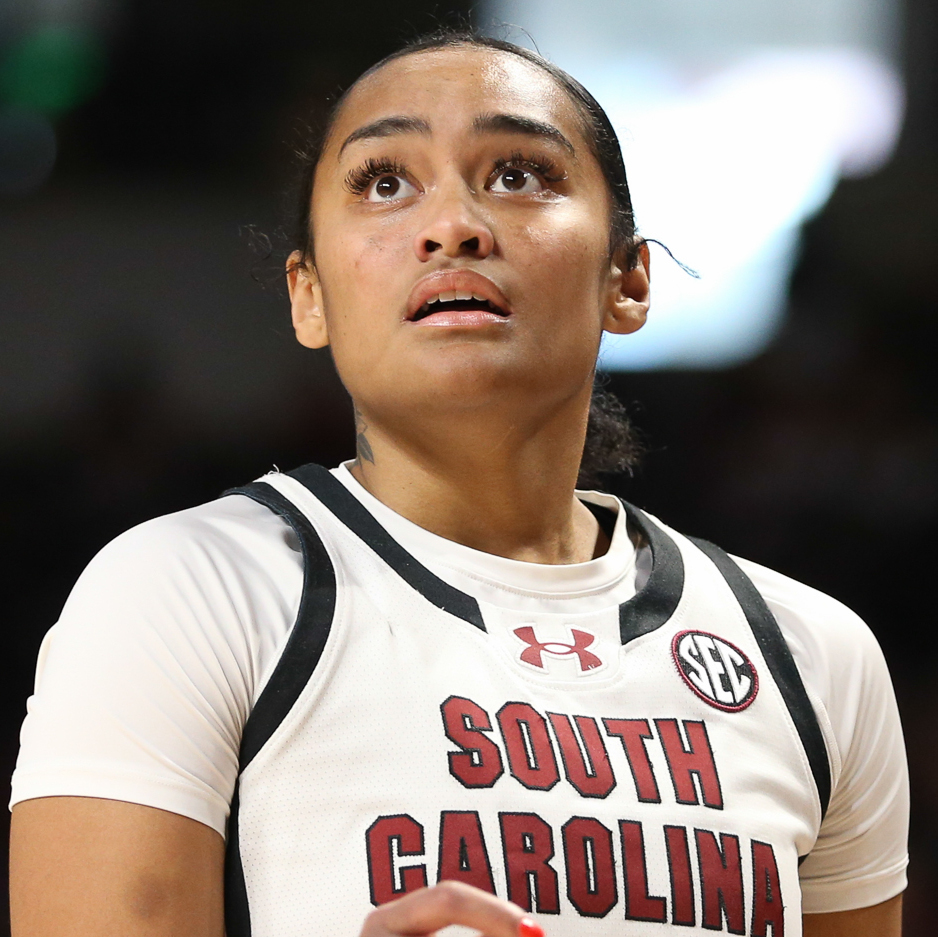
Paopao with South Carolina in 2024

As a sophomore, Paopao was sidelined early in the season due to injury. She averaged 13.6 points, 4.2 rebounds and 3.4 assists per game, repeating as an All-Pac-12 selection. She repeated with All-Pac-12 honors in her sophomore year. By sophomore year, all the other four five-star recruits from Paopao's recruiting class had transferred out of Oregon. However, Paopao confirmed her stance to stay with the Oregon program. Two years later in a podcast, she revealed that while her family had encouraged her to transfer as well, she chose to stay to be 'loyal' to the program who had stuck with her through her high school injuries.

In her junior season, Paopao averaged 13.1 points, 4.2 rebounds 3.3 assists per game, earning All-Pac-12 honorable mention. Te-hina had faced a 6 game shooting slump this season, she later talks about how it had affected her mental health. Despite the slump, her 3PT% stats still concluded at 44%.

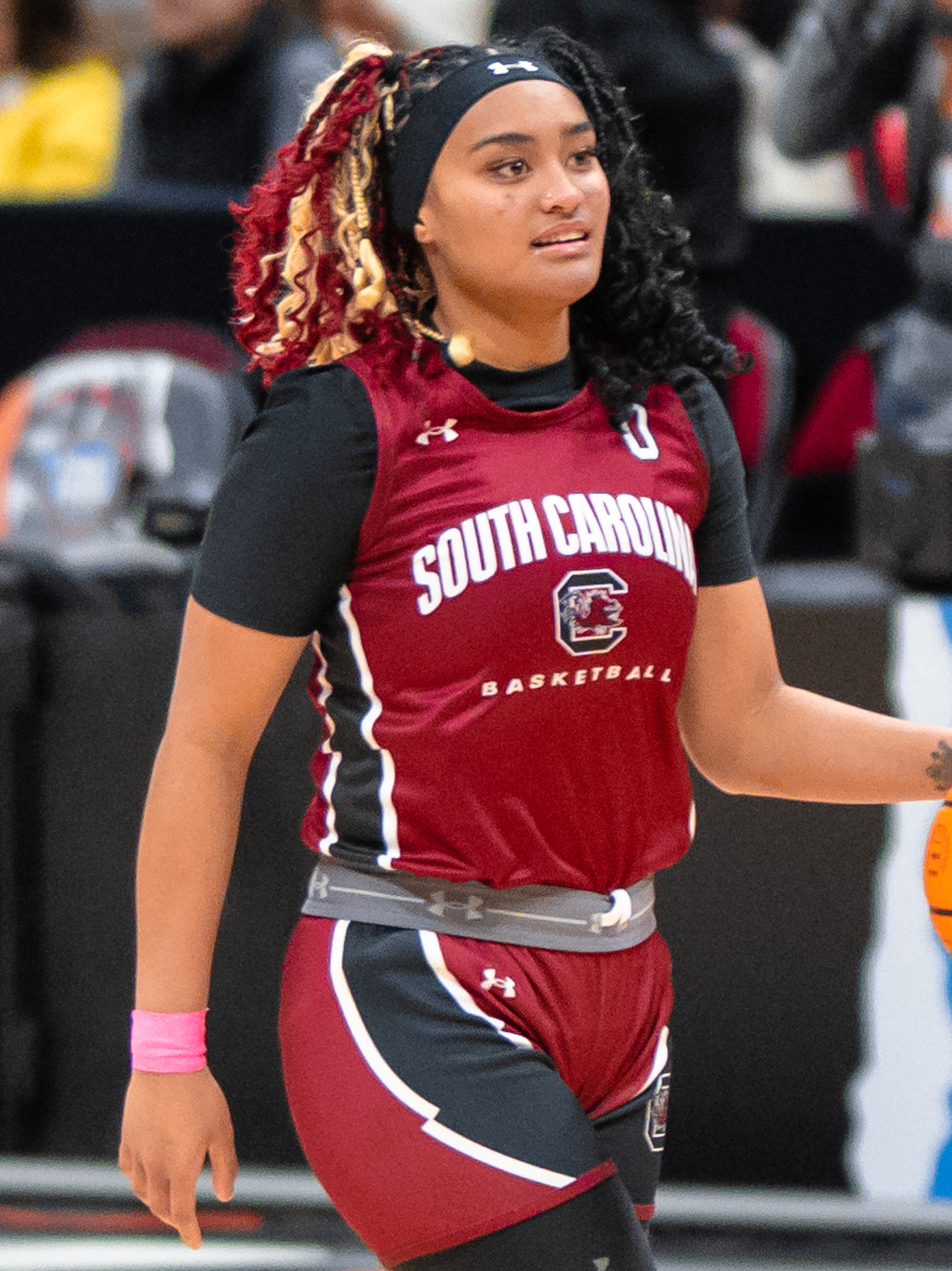
Paopao with South Carolina before the 2024 NCAA championship game

For her senior season, she transferred out of Oregon and was recruited by Dawn Staley to South Carolina for her 3-point shooting skills, leadership and experience. Staley has commented on the impact of Paopao on their team, “It makes a big difference for someone like Pao, who is always calm, cool, collected. You know what her capabilities are. You know that you've got to guard her. She doesn't take bad shots, so it's great to have that on the floor and great to get our starting five back together just playing as a cohesive unit.”

At the end of the regular season, Paopao was the nation’s top percentage 3-point shooter, hitting a career-high 48.6 percent from beyond the arc, and is among the SEC’s top 10 with 3.8 assists per game. She leads the SEC and is 19th in the nation in player offensive rating (Her Hoop Stats). Her 11.5 points per game include 15 games shooting at least 50.0 percent from the field and 11 games of at least three 3-pointers. In six games against ranked opponents, she is the Gamecocks’ top scorer at 15.0 points per game on 48.7 percent 3-point shooting. On the season, her 11.5 points per game and the 8.8 points per game teammates score on her assists, means Paopao has had her hand on 23.2 percent of the Gamecocks’ total offense. Against ranked opponents, that number rises to 29.8 percent. Paopao was named as "Finalist" for the Nancy Lieberman Award, alongside Georgia Amoore, Caitlin Clark, Hannah Hidalgo, and Jacy Sheldon. After Senior Day, Te-Hina declared that she will be returning for her fifth year of eligibility.

== Professional career ==
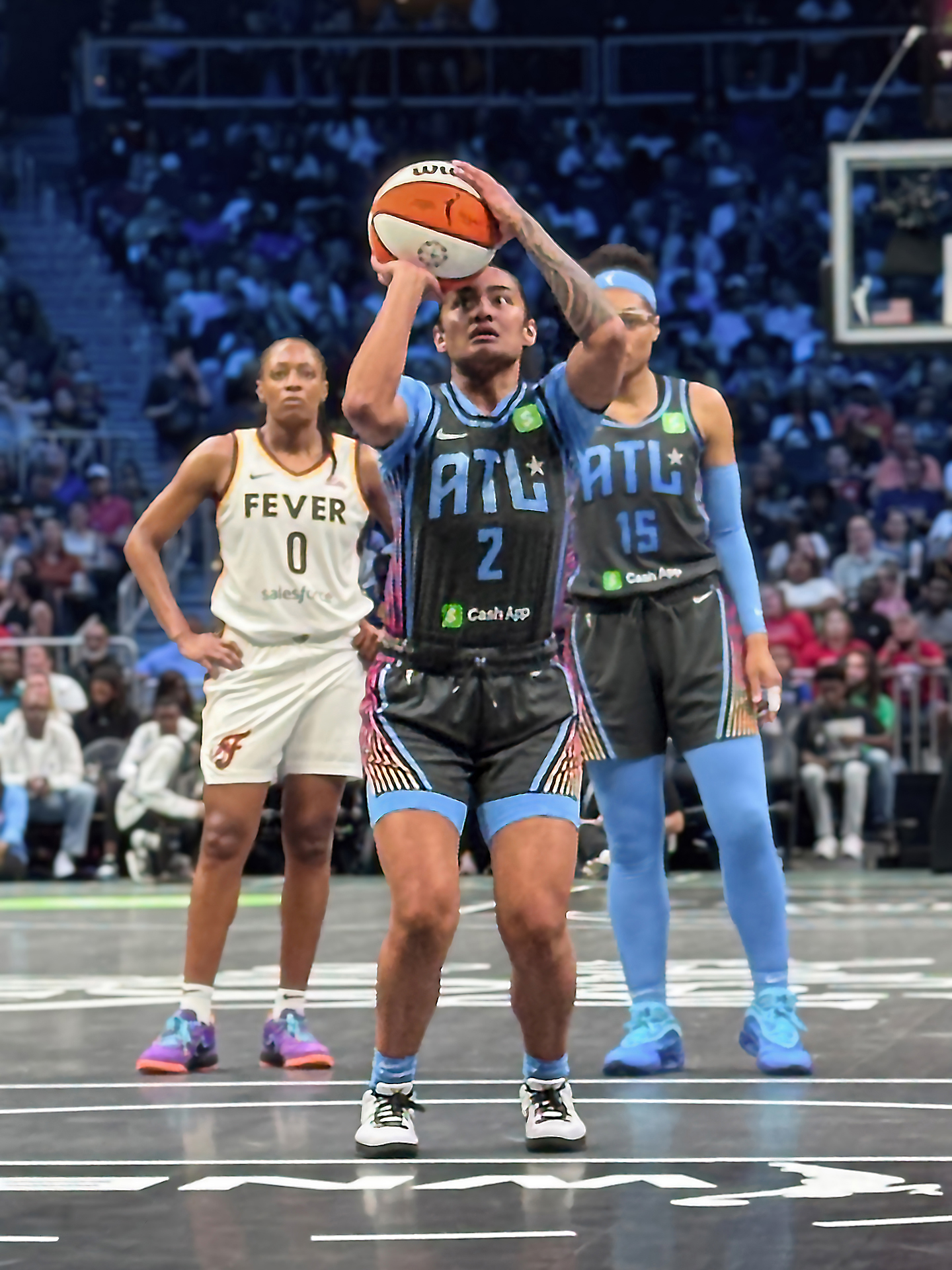
PaoPao, during rookie year with Atlanta Dream, 2025

On April 14, 2025, Paopao was drafted by the Atlanta Dream with the eighteenth pick in the second round. She is the first player of Tokelauan descent to be drafted into the Women's National Basketball Association (WNBA).

=== Athletes Unlimited ===
In September 2025, Paopao joined Athletes Unlimited Pro Basketball for its fifth season, expanding her professional experience following her rookie year in the WNBA.

== National team career ==
Paopao represented the United States at the 2021 FIBA Under-19 Women's Basketball World Cup in Hungary. She averaged 9.1 points, 4.6 assists and 3.9 rebounds per game, helping her team win the gold medal.

== Career statistics ==
=== WNBA ===
Legend
| GP | Games played | GS | Games started | MPG | Minutes per game | RPG | Rebounds per game |
| APG | Assists per game | SPG | Steals per game | BPG | Blocks per game | PPG | Points per game |
| TO | Turnovers per game | FG% | Field-goal percentage | 3P% | 3-point field-goal percentage | FT% | Free-throw percentage |
| **Bold** | Career best | ° | League leader |

==== Regular season ====
WNBA regular season statistics
| Year | Team | GP | GS | MPG | FG% | 3P% | FT% | RPG | APG | SPG | BPG | TO | PPG |
|---|---|---|---|---|---|---|---|---|---|---|---|---|---|
| 2025 | Atlanta | **43** | **15** | **16.7** | **.440** | **.386** | .538 | **1.6** | **2.4** | **.5** | **.2** | 1.0 | **5.8** |
| 2026 | Atlanta | 35 | 1 | 11.6 | .354 | .357 | **.900** | .8 | 1.3 | .2 | .1 | **.5** | 3.7 |
| **Career** | 2 years, 1 team | 78 | 16 | 14.4 | .409 | .375 | .696 | 1.2 | 1.9 | .3 | .2 | .8 | 4.9 |

==== Playoffs ====
WNBA playoff statistics
| Year | Team | GP | GS | MPG | FG% | 3P% | FT% | RPG | APG | SPG | BPG | TO | PPG |
|---|---|---|---|---|---|---|---|---|---|---|---|---|---|
| 2025 | Atlanta | 3 | 3 | 9.7 | .533 | .275 | — | 1.7 | .3 | .3 | .3 | 1.3 | 6.3 |
| **Career** | 1 year, 1 team | 3 | 3 | 9.7 | .533 | .275 | — | 1.7 | .3 | .3 | .3 | 1.3 | 6.3 |

=== College ===
Legend
| GP | Games played | GS | Games started | MPG | Minutes per game | FG% | Field goal percentage |
| 3P% | 3-point field goal percentage | FT% | Free throw percentage | RPG | Rebounds per game | APG | Assists per game |
| SPG | Steals per game | BPG | Blocks per game | TO | Turnovers per game | PPG | Points per game |
| **Bold** | Career high | * | Led Division I |

=== College ===
Te-Hina Paopao NCAA Statistics
| Year | Team | GP | GS | MPG | FG% | 3P% | FT% | RPG | APG | SPG | BPG | TO | PPG |
|---|---|---|---|---|---|---|---|---|---|---|---|---|---|
| 2020–21 | Oregon | 19 | 19 | 28.4 | .433 | .462 | .800 | 3.2 | **4.4** | **1.4** | **.3** | 1.8 | 10.2 |
| 2021–22 | Oregon | 23 | 22 | **32.7** | .387 | .300 | .870 | 4.0 | 3.3 | 1.1 | .1 | 2.0 | **13.6** |
| 2022–23 | Oregon | 35 | 35 | 32.5 | .440 | .424 | **.880** | **4.2** | 3.3 | 1.3 | **.3** | 1.8 | 13.1 |
| 2023–24 | South Carolina | 37 | 37 | 27.4 | **.461** | **.468*** | .848 | 2.6 | 3.7 | .8 | .2 | 1.6 | 11.0 |
| 2024–25 | South Carolina | **38** | **38** | 25.1 | .450 | .371 | .737 | 2.7 | 2.9 | 1.1 | **.3** | **1.2** | 9.6 |
| **Career** | | 152 | 151 | 28.9 | .435 | .400 | .836 | 3.3 | 3.4 | 1.1 | .3 | 1.7 | 11.4 |

== Personal life ==
Paopao is of Samoan and Tokelauan descent. Her uncle, Joe Salave'a, played in the National Football League as a defensive tackle before becoming a college football coach. She is a cousin of softball player Megan Faraimo.
