= Mark Johnson (pitcher) =

American baseball player (born 1975)

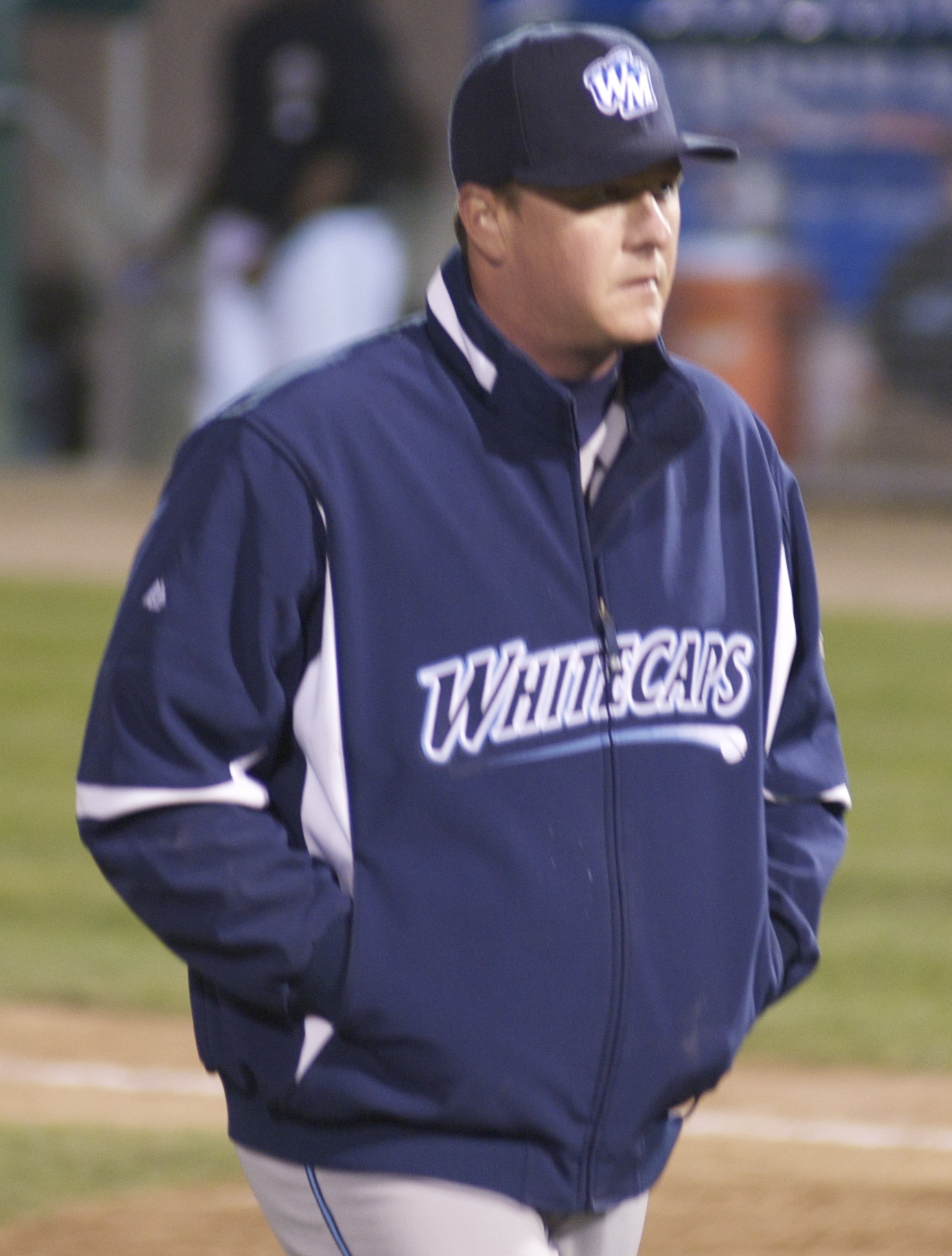
- Johnson as a coach with the West Michigan Whitecaps in 2008
- Pitcher
- Born: May 2, 1975 (age 51); Dayton, Ohio, U.S.
- Batted: Right Threw: Right

MLB debut
- April 7, 2000, for the Detroit Tigers

Last MLB appearance
- June 24, 2000, for the Detroit Tigers

MLB statistics
- Win–loss record: 0–1
- Earned run average: 7.50
- Strikeouts: 11
- Stats at Baseball Reference

Teams
- Detroit Tigers (2000)

Mark J. Johnson (born May 2, 1975) is an American former professional baseball pitcher. Johnson pitched in Major League Baseball for the Detroit Tigers in 2000. He is currently the pitching coach for the Lancaster Stormers.

== Career ==
Johnson attended Springboro High School and the University of Hawaii. In 1994, he played collegiate summer baseball with the Brewster Whitecaps of the Cape Cod Baseball League.

Johnson was drafted by the Houston Astros in the first round (19th overall) of the 1996 MLB draft. After the 1997 season, Houston traded Johnson, and fellow pitchers Manuel Barrios, and Oscar Henriquez to the Florida Marlins for outfielder Moisés Alou. In February 1999, the Marlins traded Johnson, Ed Yarnall, and Todd Noel to the New York Yankees for Mike Lowell.

After the 1999 season, the Detroit Tigers chose Johnson in the Rule 5 draft. He pitched in nine games for the Tigers, his only stint in the majors. The Tigers released him on June 28.

Johnson continued to pitch in the minors until 2005. He pitched in the Milwaukee Brewers and Tigers organizations in 2002, the Tigers in 2003, the Los Angeles Dodgers system in 2004, and the Tigers in 2005.

== Coaching career ==
Johnson became a pitching coach in the Tigers minor league system beginning in 2007 with the Oneonta Tigers. He then coached for the West Michigan White Caps, Connecticut Tigers, Lakeland Flying Tigers, and Erie SeaWolves, coaching the Triple-A affiliate in 2019 and 2021.

On March 18, 2022, Johnson was hired as the pitching coach for the Lancaster Barnstormers of the Atlantic League of Professional Baseball. He helped Lancaster win Atlantic League titles in his first two seasons with the team.
