= List of 2025 WNBA season transactions =

This is a list of transactions that occurred during the 2024–25 WNBA off-season and the 2025 WNBA season. This includes retirements, front office transitions, player signings, and player trades. The list also includes information about the expansion draft that took place as the Golden State Valkyries entered their first year of play in 2025. The list also includes information regarding in-season roster moves, such as hardship contracts, waiver wire transactions, contract suspensions, and players who are inactive.

== Retirement ==
List of WNBA players who retired in 2024 offseason or 2025 regular season
Date	Name	Image	Team(s) played (years)	Age	Notes	Ref.
September 20, 2024	Layshia Clarendon	Layshia Clarendon in 2019	Indiana Fever (2013–2015); Atlanta Dream (2015–2018); Connecticut Sun (2018–2019); New York Liberty (2020–2021); Minnesota Lynx (2021); Los Angeles Sparks (2023–2024)	33	WNBA All-Star (2017); First openly nonbinary and trans player in the league; First active player to have top surgery; Also played in Athletes Unlimited	
January 1, 2025	Danielle Robinson	Danielle Robinson in 2019	San Antonio Stars / Las Vegas Aces (2011–2015, 2020); Phoenix Mercury (2017); Minnesota Lynx (2018–2019); Indiana Fever (2021–2022); Atlanta Dream (2023)	35	3× WNBA All-Star (2013–2015); All-WNBA Second Team (2014); 3× WNBA All-Defensive Second Team (2012–2014); WNBA Assists Leader (2013); WNBA Peak Performer – Assists (2013); WNBA All-Rookie Team (2011); Also played abroad (EuroLeague champion); Hired as Manager of Basketball Integration and Scout Support for Los Angeles Sparks in January 2025	
February 25, 2025	Diana Taurasi	Diana Taurasi in 2024	Phoenix Mercury (2004–2024)	42	3× WNBA champion (2007, 2009, 2014); 2× WNBA Finals MVP (2009, 2014); WNBA MVP (2009); 11× WNBA All-Star (2005–2007, 2009, 2011, 2013–2014, 2017–2018, 2021, 2024); 10× All-WNBA First Team (2004, 2006–2011, 2013–2014, 2018); 4× All-WNBA Second Team (2005, 2016–2017, 2020); First overall WNBA draft pick (2004); WNBA Rookie of the Year (2004); WNBA All-Time Leading Scorer (June 18, 2017–present); 5× WNBA Scoring Champion (2006, 2008–2011); WNBA Assists Leader (2014); 6× WNBA Peak Performer – Points (2006, 2007, 2009–2011, 2014); WNBA 15th Anniversary Team (2011); WNBA 20th Anniversary Team (2016); WNBA 25th Anniversary Team (2021); 6× Olympic Gold Medalist (2004, 2008, 2012, 2016, 2020, 2024); 4× USA Basketball Female Athlete of the Year; Also played abroad (7x WPBL champion and 6x EuroLeague champion)	
April 4, 2025	Elena Delle Donne	Elena Delle Donne in 2017	Chicago Sky (2013–2016); Washington Mystics (2017–2023)	35	WNBA champion (2019); 2× WNBA MVP (2015, 2019); 50–40–90 club (2019); 7× WNBA All-Star (2013–2015, 2017–2019, 2023); 4× All-WNBA First Team (2015, 2016, 2018, 2019); All-WNBA Second Team (2013); WNBA Rookie of the Year (2013); WNBA All-Rookie Team (2013); WNBA Scoring Champion (2015); WNBA 25th Anniversary Team (2021); Olympic Gold Medalist (2016)	
June 10, 2025	Allie Quigley	Allie Quigley in 2019	Phoenix Mercury (2008–2009); Indiana Fever (2010); San Antonio Silver Stars (2010); Seattle Storm (2011); Chicago Sky (2013–2022)	38	WNBA champion (2021); 3× WNBA All-Star (2017–2019); 2× WNBA Sixth Player of the Year (2014, 2015); 4× WNBA Three-Point Shootout champion (2017, 2018, 2021, 2022); Also played abroad (EuroLeague, EuroCup, and 2× Turkish Cup champion); Turkish Cup MVP (2016)	

== Front office movement ==
=== Head coaching changes ===
List of WNBA head coaching changes and hires made in the 2024–25 offseason
Departure date	Team	Outgoing head coach	Reason for departure	Hire date	Incoming head coach	Last coaching position	Ref.
N/A	Golden State Valkyries	2025 expansion team		October 10, 2024	Natalie Nakase	Las Vegas Aces assistant coach (2022–2024)	
September 24, 2024	Los Angeles Sparks	Curt Miller	Fired	November 19, 2024	Lynne Roberts	Utah head coach (2015–2024)	
September 27, 2024	Chicago Sky	Teresa Weatherspoon	Fired	November 3, 2024	Tyler Marsh	Las Vegas Aces assistant coach (2022–2024)	
October 2, 2024	Atlanta Dream	Tanisha Wright	Fired	November 13, 2024	Karl Smesko	Florida Gulf Coast head coach (2002–2024)	
October 18, 2024	Dallas Wings	Latricia Trammell	Fired	December 23, 2024	Chris Koclanes	USC assistant coach (2023–2024)	
October 23, 2024	Washington Mystics	Eric Thibault	Mutual separation	December 23, 2024	Sydney Johnson	Chicago Sky assistant coach (2024)	
October 27, 2024	Indiana Fever	Christie Sides	Fired	November 1, 2024	Stephanie White	Connecticut Sun head coach (2023–2024)	
November 1, 2024	Connecticut Sun	Stephanie White	Resigned	December 4, 2024	Rachid Meziane	Villeneuve-d'Ascq head coach (2019–2024); Belgium national team head coach (2022–2024)	

=== General manager changes ===
List of WNBA general manager changes and hires made in the 2024–25 offseason and 2025 regular season
Departure date	Team	Outgoing general manager	Reason for departure	Hire date	Incoming general manager	Last managerial position	Ref..
October 4, 2024	Indiana Fever	Lin Dunn	Role change (Note: Senior Advisor for Indiana Fever)	October 4, 2024	Amber Cox (Note: Also hired as Indiana Fever's Chief Operating Officer)	Kansas City Current Chief Operating Officer (2021–2024)	
October 18, 2024	Dallas Wings	Greg Bibb	Dispersion of duty	November 8, 2024	Curt Miller (Note: Also hired as Dallas Wings' Executive Vice President)	Connecticut Sun General Manager (2016–2022)	
October 23, 2024	Washington Mystics	Mike Thibault	Mutual separation	December 23, 2024	Jamila Wideman	NBA Senior Vice President of Player Development (2018–2024)	
October 26, 2024	Las Vegas Aces	Natalie Williams	Contract not renewed	—	Vacant	—	
November 11, 2024	Minnesota Lynx	Clare Duwelius	Resigned	—	Vacant	—	
December 3, 2024	Connecticut Sun	Darius Taylor	Role change (Note: Connecticut Sun's Chief Basketball Strategist and Director of Scouting)	December 3, 2024	Morgan Tuck	Connecticut Sun Director of Franchise Development (2021–2024); Connecticut Sun Assistant General Manager (2022–2024)	
N/A	Toronto Tempo	2026 expansion team		February 20, 2025	Monica Wright Rogers	Phoenix Mercury Assistant General Manager (2023–2025)	
N/A	Portland Fire	2026 expansion team		September 15, 2025	Vanja Černivec	London Lions general manager (2022–2024); Golden State Valkyries vice president of basketball operations (2024–2025)	

== Player movement ==
=== Expansion draft ===
On December 6, 2024, an expansion draft took place to help fill the roster for the Golden State Valkyries for their debut WNBA season in 2025.

2024 expansion draft picks
Pick	Player	Position	Former Team	Nationality	Notes (at time of draft)	Ref.
1	Iliana Rupert	Center	Atlanta Dream	France	Suspended – contract expired	
2	María Conde	Forward	Chicago Sky	Spain	Suspended – contract expired	
3	Veronica Burton	Guard	Connecticut Sun	United States	Free agent – reserved	
4	Carla Leite	Guard	Dallas Wings	France	Unsigned 2024 draft pick (No. 9)	
5	Temi Fágbénlé	Center	Indiana Fever	Great Britain	Free agent – restricted	
6	Kate Martin	Guard	Las Vegas Aces	United States	Under contract for 2025 season	
7	Stephanie Talbot	Forward	Los Angeles Sparks	Australia	Under contract for 2025 season	
8	Cecilia Zandalasini	Forward	Minnesota Lynx	Italy	Free agent – reserved	
9	Kayla Thornton	Forward	New York Liberty	United States	Under contract for 2025 season	
10	Monique Billings	Forward	Phoenix Mercury	United States	Free agent – unrestricted	
11	No selection	—	Seattle Storm	—	—	
12	Julie Vanloo	Guard	Washington Mystics	Belgium	Free agent – reserved	

=== Contract extensions ===
List of players signed to contract extensions during 2025 season
Date	Player	Team	Notes	Ref.
April 18	Aliyah Boston	Indiana Fever	Exercised team option (Fourth-year)	
May 6	Maddy Siegrist	Dallas Wings	Exercised team option (Fourth-year)	
May 12	Nyara Sabally	New York Liberty	Exercised team option (Fourth-year)	
May 13	Jordan Horston	Seattle Storm	Exercised team option (Fourth-year)	
May 15	Dorka Juhász	Minnesota Lynx	Exercised team option (Fourth-year)	
May 15	Diamond Miller	Minnesota Lynx	Exercised team option (Fourth-year)	

=== Trades ===
Starting on January 21, 2025, teams were permitted to begin trades, including 2025, 2026, and 2027 draft picks.

The trade window for the 2025 season ended on August 7, 2025.

List of trades amongst teams during 2025 season
February			Ref.
February 1	Three-team trade		
February 1	To Las Vegas Aces Jewell Loyd (from Seattle); 2025 No. 13 draft pick (from Los Angeles) (Aaliyah Nye)	To Los Angeles Sparks Kelsey Plum (sign-and-trade from Las Vegas); 2025 No. 9 draft pick (from Seattle) (Sarah Ashlee Barker); 2026 second round draft pick (from Seattle)	
February 1	To Seattle Storm 2025 No. 2 draft pick (from Los Angeles) (Dominique Malonga); Rights to Li Yueru (from Los Angeles); 2026 first round draft pick (from Las Vegas)		
February 2	Four-team trade		
February 2	To Connecticut Sun Rebecca Allen (from Phoenix); Natasha Cloud (from Phoenix); Jacy Sheldon (from Dallas); 2025 No. 8 draft pick (from Indiana) (Saniya Rivers)	To Dallas Wings DiJonai Carrington (sign-and-trade from Connecticut); Tyasha Harris (from Connecticut); NaLyssa Smith (from Indiana); Right to swap third round picks in 2027 draft (from Indiana); Rights to Mikiah Herbert Harrigan (from Phoenix); 2025 No. 12 pick (from Phoenix) (Aziaha James)	
February 2	To Indiana Fever Sophie Cunningham (from Phoenix); 2025 No. 19 pick (from Phoenix) (Makayla Timpson); Jaelyn Brown (from Dallas)	To Phoenix Mercury Alyssa Thomas (sign-and-trade from Connecticut); Satou Sabally (sign-and-trade from Dallas); Kalani Brown (from Dallas); Sevgi Uzun (from Dallas)	
February 4	To Chicago Sky Rebecca Allen	To Connecticut Sun Lindsay Allen; Rights to Nikolina Milić	
February 7	To Chicago Sky 2025 No. 16 draft pick (Maddy Westbeld); 2025 No. 22 draft pick (Aicha Coulibaly)	To Las Vegas Aces Dana Evans (Sign-and-trade)	
February 14	To Los Angeles Sparks 2025 No. 21 draft pick (Sania Feagin); 2027 second round draft pick	To Seattle Storm Lexie Brown; 2025 No. 26 draft pick (Serena Sundell)	
February 23	To Chicago Sky Ariel Atkins	To Washington Mystics 2025 No. 3 draft pick (Sonia Citron); 2027 second round draft pick Rights to swap 2027 first round draft picks	
March
March 16	To Connecticut Sun 2025 No. 7 draft pick (Aneesah Morrow); 2026 first round draft pick	To New York Liberty Natasha Cloud	
April
April 13	To Chicago Sky 2025 No. 11 draft pick (Hailey Van Lith)	To Minnesota Lynx Outright 2026 first round draft pick Extinguished previous right to exchange 2026 first round draft picks with Chicago	
April 14	To Minnesota Lynx Karlie Samuelson	To Washington Mystics 2026 first round pick (Minnesota's own)	
June
June 14	To Dallas Wings Li Yueru	To Seattle Storm 2026 second round draft pick (with right to swap with the Connecticut Sun); 2027 third round pick (with right to swap with the Indiana Fever)	
June 30	To Dallas Wings 2027 first round pick	To Las Vegas Aces NaLyssa Smith	
August
August 3	To Dallas Wings Diamond Miller; Karlie Samuelson; 2027 second round pick (Minnesota's own)	To Minnesota Lynx DiJonai Carrington	
August 5	To Seattle Storm Brittney Sykes	To Washington Mystics Alysha Clark; Zia Cooke; 2026 first round pick (Seattle's own)	
August 7	To Connecticut Sun Aaliyah Edwards	To Washington Mystics Jacy Sheldon; Right to swap 2026 first round picks (Washington with Minnesota's own and Connecticut with New York's own acquired from prior trades)	

=== Free agency ===
From January 11–20, 2025, teams were able to extend qualifying offers to core-eligible or reserved players.

The free agency negotiation period began on January 21, 2025, and teams were able to officially begin signing players on February 1, 2025.

The mid-season cut down date for the 2025 season was July 13, the final date teams could waive players on unprotected contracts without financial penalty.

Denotes uncoreable unrestricted free agent
Denotes unrestricted free agent
Denotes restricted free agent
Denotes reserved free agent
Denotes sign-and-trade player

^{S}	Denotes player whose contract was suspended for 2025 season
^{X}	Denotes signed player who failed to make 2025 opening-day roster
^{W}	Denotes signed player who was waived during regular season
^{R}	Denotes signed player who was released during regular season

==== Core designation ====
Players cored in 2025 WNBA season
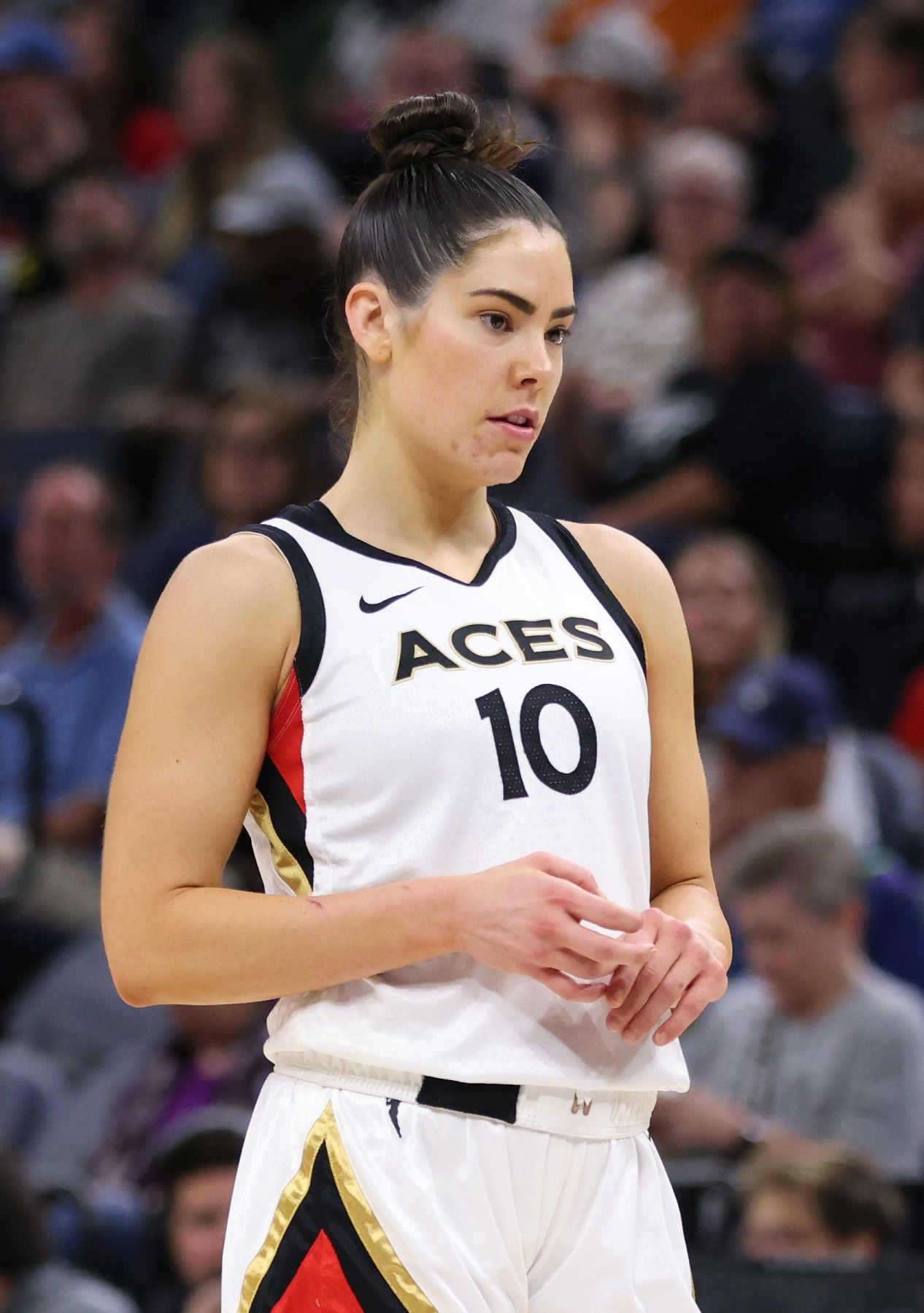
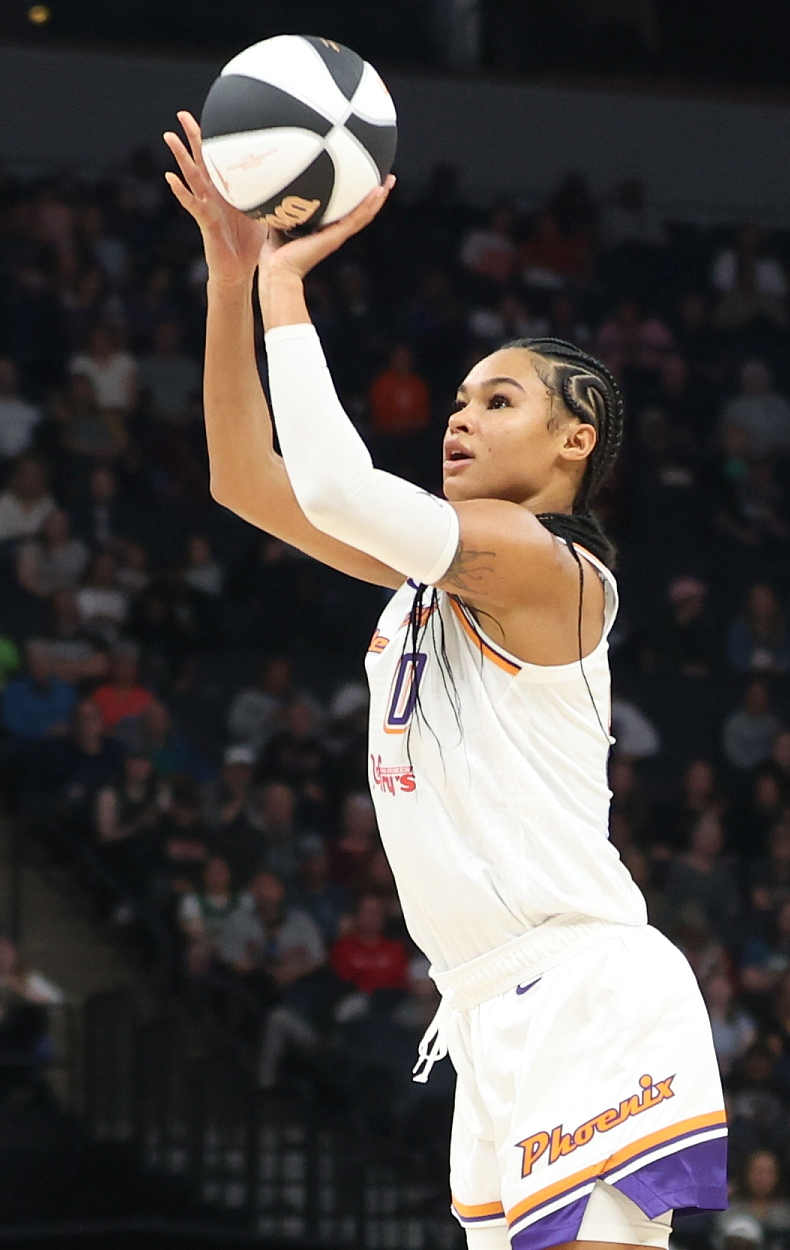
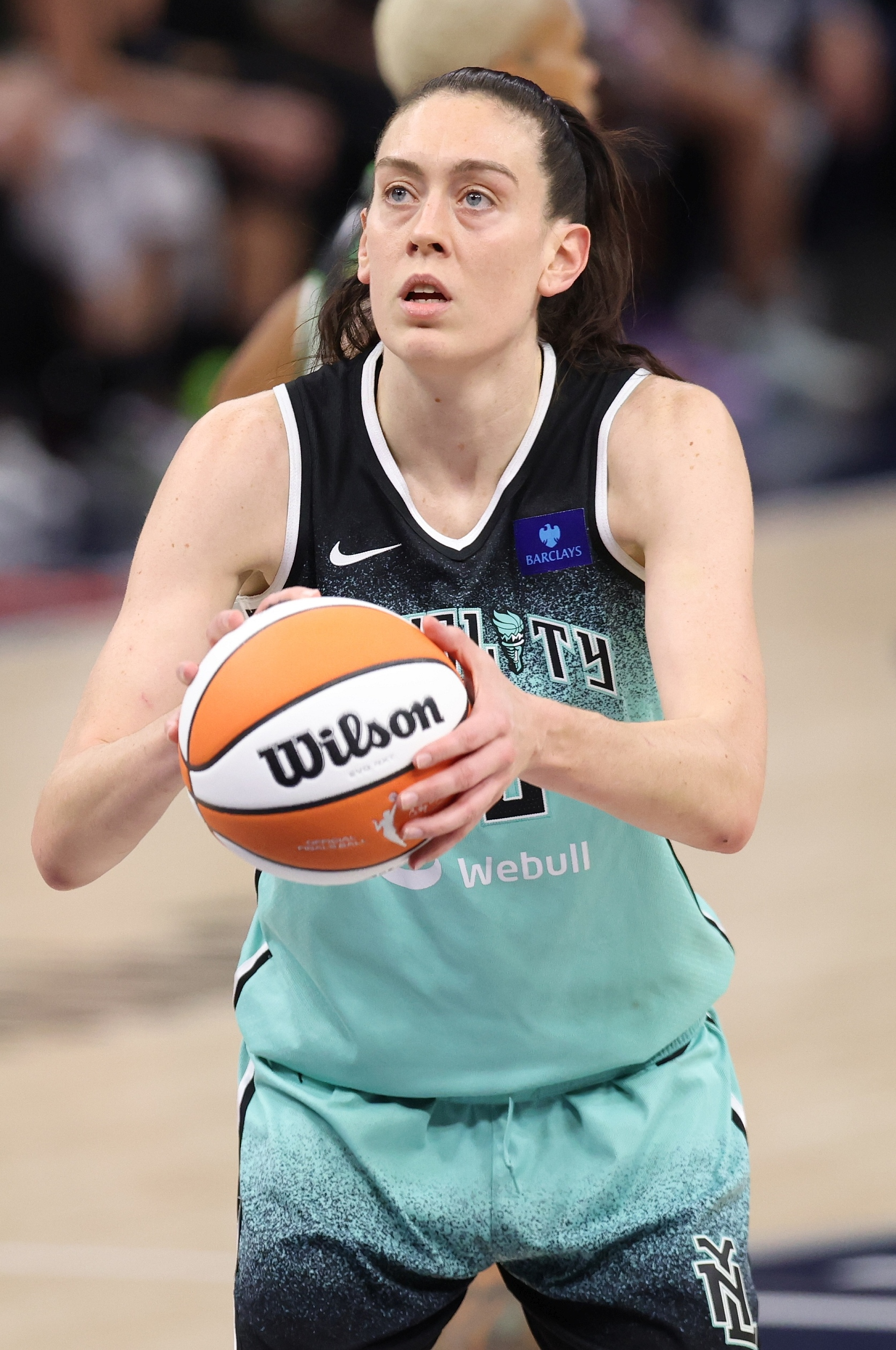
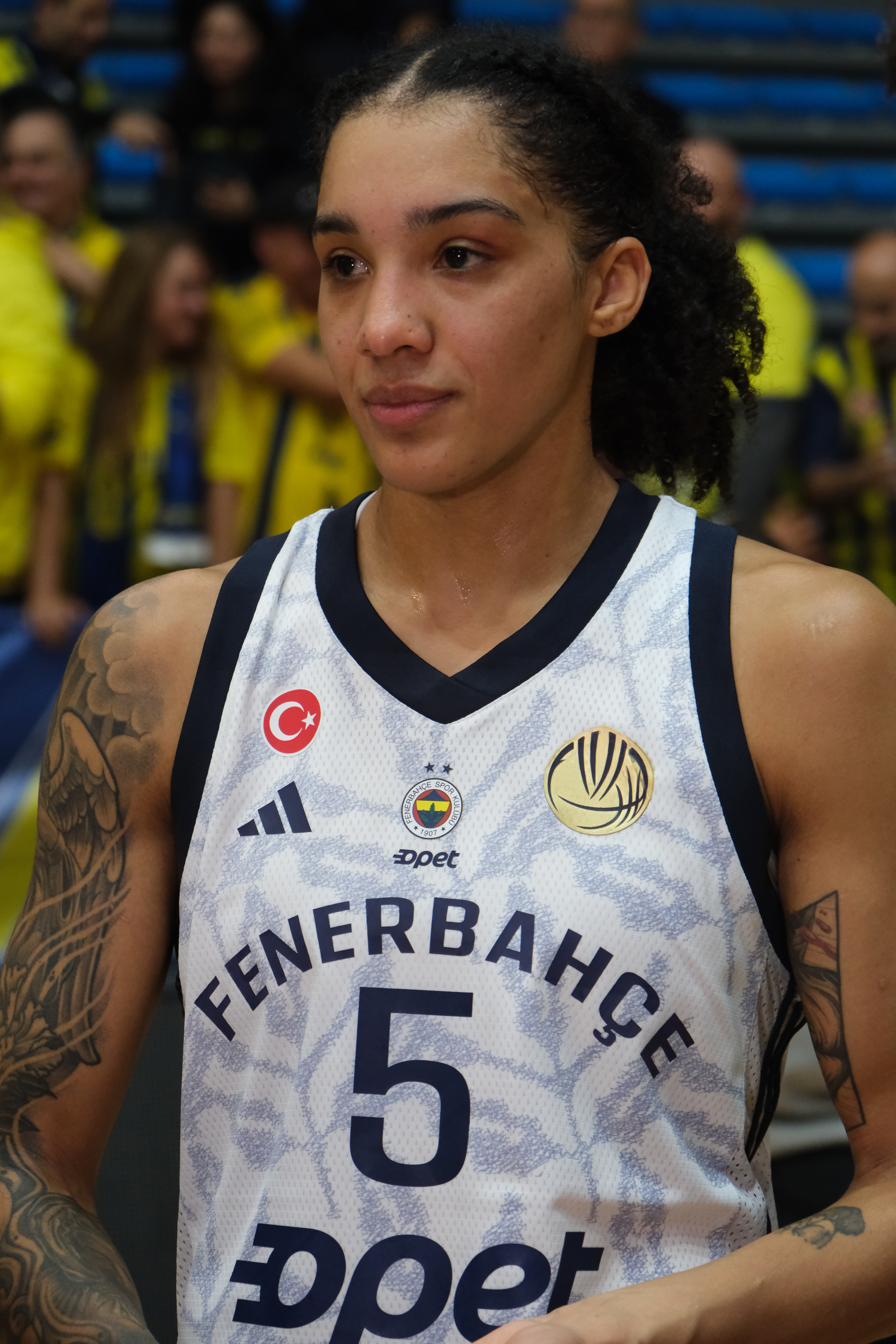
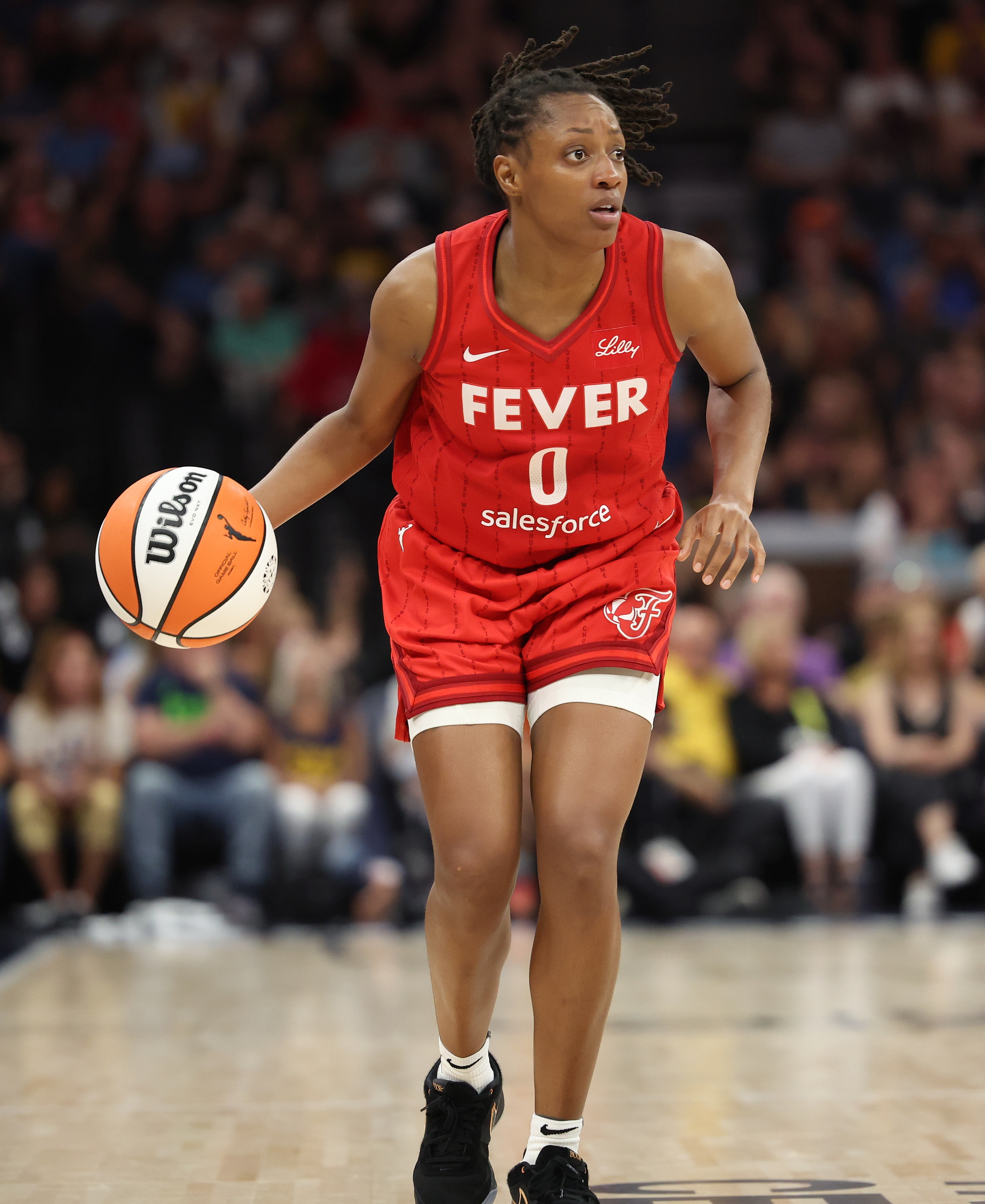
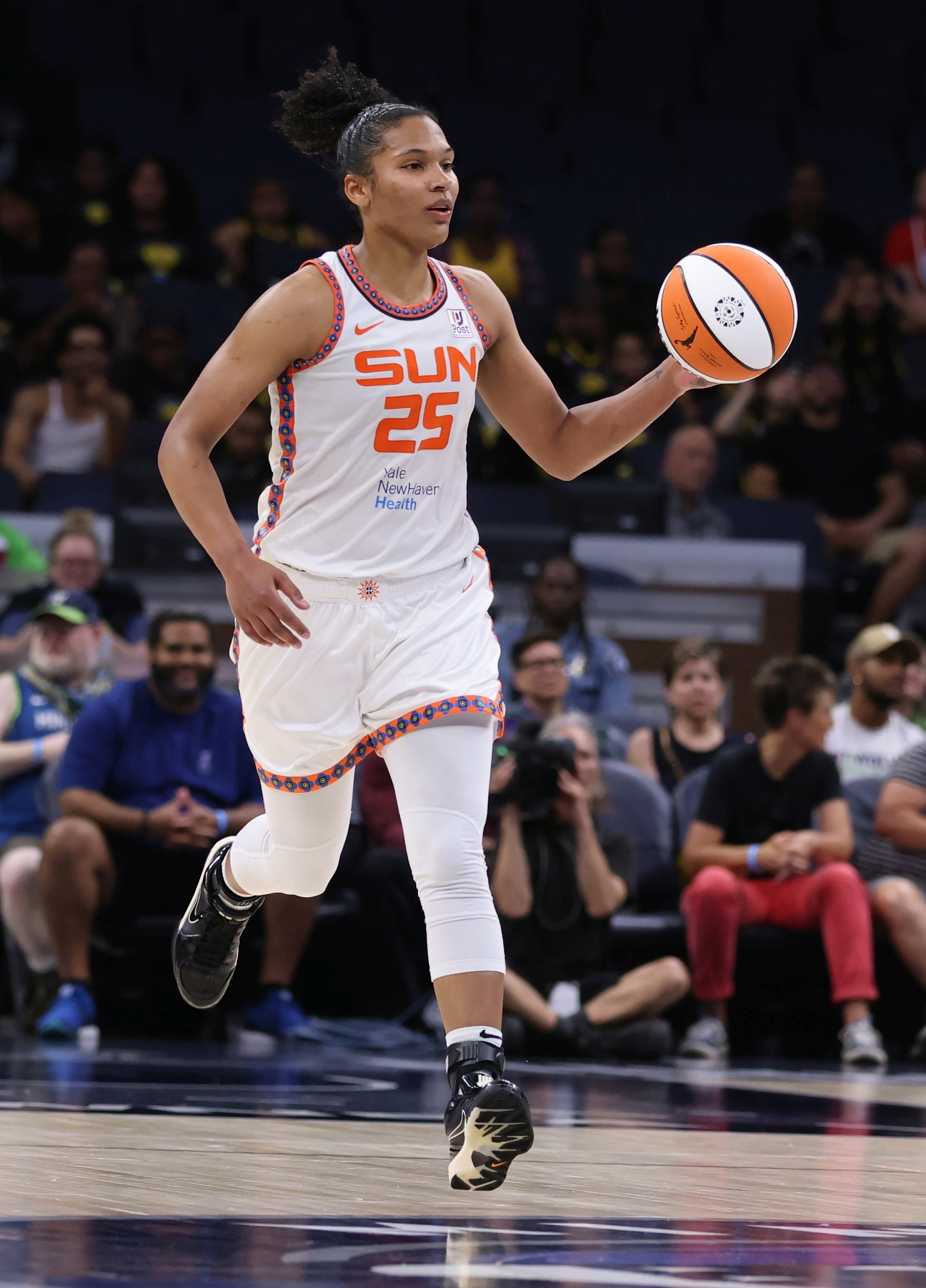
- Top row: Kelsey Plum, Satou Sabally, Breanna Stewart (left to right)
- Bottom row: Gabby Williams, Kelsey Mitchell, Alyssa Thomas (left to right)

List of players cored during 2025 season
Date designated	Player	Cored placed by	Notes	Ref.
January 11	Kelsey Plum	Las Vegas Aces	Traded to Los Angeles Sparks on February 1 (Sign-and-trade)	
January 13	Satou Sabally	Dallas Wings	Traded to Phoenix Mercury on February 2 (Sign-and-trade)	
January 13	Breanna Stewart	New York Liberty	Accepted core offer on March 29 (Signed one-year deal)	
January 14	Gabby Williams	Seattle Storm	Accepted core offer on February 10 (Signed a reported one-year deal)	
January 16	Kelsey Mitchell	Indiana Fever	Accepted core offer on January 29	
January 17	Alyssa Thomas	Connecticut Sun	Traded to Phoenix Mercury on February 2 (Sign-and-trade)	

==== Free agents ====
List of free agents signed in the off-season (January 11–April 26)
Date signed	Player	Notes	New team	Former team	Ref.
January 13	Jaelyn Brown ^{X}	Training camp contract	Dallas Wings (Traded to Indiana Fever on February 2)		
January 15	Rebekah Gardner	Training camp contract	New York Liberty		
January 15	Jaylyn Sherrod ^{W}	Training camp contract	New York Liberty		
January 17	Natasha Mack	Training camp contract	Phoenix Mercury		
January 18	Maya Caldwell	Training camp contract	Atlanta Dream		
January 22	Caitlin Bickle ^{X}	Training camp contract	Connecticut Sun		
January 22	Celeste Taylor ^{X}	Training camp contract	Phoenix Mercury		
January 22	Sevgi Uzun ^{W}	Training camp contract	Dallas Wings (Traded to Phoenix Mercury on February 2)		
February 1	Marième Badiane ^{W}	Training camp contract	Minnesota Lynx	Fenerbahçe S.K. (Turkey)	
February 1	Kennedy Burke	Training camp contract	New York Liberty		
February 1	Raquel Carrera ^{S}	Training camp contract	New York Liberty	Valencia Basket (Spain)	
February 1	Brittney Griner	One-year deal	Atlanta Dream	Phoenix Mercury	
February 1	Natisha Hiedeman	One-year deal	Minnesota Lynx		
February 1	Brionna Jones	One-year deal	Atlanta Dream	Connecticut Sun	
February 1	Esmery Martínez ^{X}	Training camp contract	New York Liberty	Flammes Carolo Basket (France)	
February 1	Courtney Vandersloot	One-year deal	Chicago Sky	New York Liberty	
February 1	Shatori Walker-Kimbrough	One-year deal	Atlanta Dream	Washington Mystics	
February 1	Li Yueru	Training camp contract	Seattle Storm		
February 2	Amy Atwell ^{X}	Training camp contract	Phoenix Mercury		
February 2	Emma Cannon	Training camp contract	Los Angeles Sparks	Henan Phoenix (China)	
February 2	Kaila Charles ^{W}	Training camp contract	Dallas Wings	Diósgyőri VTK (Hungary)	
February 2	Tina Charles	One-year deal	Connecticut Sun	Atlanta Dream	
February 2	Luisa Geiselsöder	Training camp contract	Dallas Wings	Basket Landes (France)	
February 2	Myisha Hines-Allen	One-year deal	Dallas Wings	Minnesota Lynx	
February 2	Joyner Holmes ^{X}	Training camp contract	Dallas Wings	Seattle Storm	
February 2	Anneli Maley ^{X}	Training camp contract	Los Angeles Sparks	Perth Lynx (Australia)	
February 2	Michaela Onyenwere	One-year deal	Chicago Sky		
February 2	Odyssey Sims ^{W}	One-year deal	Los Angeles Sparks		
February 2	Sami Whitcomb	Details unannounced	Phoenix Mercury	Seattle Storm	
February 3	Monique Billings	One-year deal	Golden State Valkyries		
February 3	Veronica Burton	Training camp contract	Golden State Valkyries		
February 3	Diamond DeShields ^{X}	One-year deal	Connecticut Sun	Chicago Sky	
February 3	Natasha Howard	One-year deal	Indiana Fever	Dallas Wings	
February 3	Julie Vanloo ^{W}	Training camp contract	Golden State Valkyries		
February 4	Emily Engstler	Training camp contract	Washington Mystics		
February 4	Mya Hollingshed ^{X}	Training camp contract	Connecticut Sun	Bodrum Basketbol (Turkey)	
February 4	Kia Nurse	One-year deal	Chicago Sky	Los Angeles Sparks	
February 4	Robyn Parks ^{W}	Training camp contract	Connecticut Sun	Emlak Konut (Turkey)	
February 4	Sug Sutton	Training camp contract	Washington Mystics		
February 5	Chloe Bibby ^{X}	Training camp contract	Golden State Valkyries	Spar Girona (Spain)	
February 5	DeWanna Bonner ^{W}	One-year deal	Indiana Fever	Connecticut Sun	
February 5	Kyara Linskens ^{W}	Training camp contract	Golden State Valkyries	Belgium National Team	
February 5	Janelle Salaün	Training camp contract	Golden State Valkyries	Famila Schio (Italy)	
February 5	Holly Winterburn ^{S}	Training camp contract	Atlanta Dream	Beşiktaş HDI Sigorta (Turkey)	
February 5	Mai Yamamoto ^{X}	Training camp contract	Dallas Wings	Toyota Antelopes (Japan)	
February 6	Yvonne Anderson ^{X}	Two-year deal	Connecticut Sun	Çimsa ÇBK Mersin (Turkey)	
February 6	Sydney Colson	One-year deal	Indiana Fever	Las Vegas Aces	
February 6	Elissa Cunane ^{X}	Training camp contract	Golden State Valkyries	BK Žabiny Brno (Czech Republic)	
February 6	Tiffany Hayes	One-year deal	Golden State Valkyries	Las Vegas Aces	
February 6	Cheyenne Parker-Tyus	Training camp contract	Las Vegas Aces	Atlanta Dream	
February 7	Queen Egbo ^{X}	Training camp contract	Las Vegas Aces		
February 7	Lexi Held	Training camp contract	Phoenix Mercury	PEAC-Pécs (Hungary)	
February 7	Anna Makurat ^{X}	Training camp contract	Phoenix Mercury	Geas Basket (Italy)	
February 8	Tiffany Mitchell ^{W}	Details unannounced	Las Vegas Aces	Connecticut Sun	
February 8	Nneka Ogwumike	Reported 1-year deal	Seattle Storm		
February 9	Alysha Clark	One-year deal	Seattle Storm	Las Vegas Aces	
February 10	Kiara Leslie ^{X}	Training camp contract	Minnesota Lynx	Gigantes de Carolina (Puerto Rico)	
February 10	Kathryn Westbeld	Training camp contract	Phoenix Mercury	TARR KSC Szekszárd (Hungary)	
February 11	Kitija Laksa	One-year deal	Phoenix Mercury	Fenerbahçe S.K. (Turkey)	
February 11	Mercedes Russell ^{W}	One-year deal	Los Angeles Sparks	Seattle Storm	
February 11	Taylor Soule ^{X}	Training camp contract	Washington Mystics	Zagłębie Sosnowiec (Poland)	
February 12	Kaitlyn Davis ^{X}	Training camp contract	New York Liberty	Rojas de Veracruz (Mexico)	
February 12	Erica Wheeler	Training camp contract	Seattle Storm	Indiana Fever	
February 13	Zia Cooke	Training camp contract	Seattle Storm	Los Angeles Sparks	
February 13	Kariata Diaby ^{W}	Training camp contract	Connecticut Sun	Tango Bourges Basket (France)	
February 13	Maria Kliundikova ^{X}	Training camp contract	Los Angeles Sparks		
February 13	Brianna Fraser ^{X}	Training camp contract	Seattle Storm	Galatasaray S.K. (Turkey)	
February 13	Amy Okonkwo ^{X}	Training camp contract	Connecticut Sun	Tango Bourges Basket (France)	
February 16	Brianna Turner	Details unannounced	Indiana Fever	Chicago Sky	
February 17	Murjanatu Musa ^{W}	Training camp contract	Phoenix Mercury	Tarbes Gespe Bigorre (France)	
February 17	Elena Tsineke ^{X}	Training camp contract	Las Vegas Aces	AZS AJP Gorzów Wielkopolski (Poland)	
February 18	Mikiah Herbert Harrigan ^{X}	Training camp contract	Dallas Wings		
February 21	Crystal Bradford ^{W}	Training camp contract	Las Vegas Aces	Shanghai Sharks (China)	
February 21	Isabelle Harrison	Training camp contract	New York Liberty	Chicago Sky	
February 21	Katie Lou Samuelson	Details unannounced	Seattle Storm	Indiana Fever	
February 22	Arella Guirantes ^{X}	Training camp contract	Chicago Sky	Shanghai Swordfish (China)	
February 24	Kamila Borkowska ^{X}	Training camp contract	Connecticut Sun	Zagłębie Sosnowiec (Poland)	
February 24	Haley Peters ^{W}	Training camp contract	Connecticut Sun	Villeneuve-d'Ascq (France)	
February 25	Camryn Taylor ^{X}	Training camp contract	Minnesota Lynx	Esperides Kallitheas (Greece)	
February 26	Christyn Williams ^{X}	Training camp contract	Minnesota Lynx	Athletes Unlimited	
February 27	Alex Wilson ^{X}	Training camp contract	Chicago Sky	Perth Lynx (Australia)	
February 28	McKenzie Forbes ^{X}	Training camp contract	Dallas Wings	Mainland Pouakai (New Zealand)	
March 3	Morgan Bertsch ^{X}	Training camp contract	Chicago Sky	Hozono Global Jairis (Spain)	
March 6	Ashley Joens ^{X}	Training camp contract	Atlanta Dream	Athinaikos AS Vurona (Greece)	
March 7	Cecilia Zandalasini	One-year deal	Golden State Valkyries		
March 11	Monique Akoa Makani	Training camp contract	Phoenix Mercury	Charnay Basket Bourgogne Sud (France)	
March 13	Shyla Heal ^{X}	Training camp contract	Phoenix Mercury	Tarsus Belediyesi Mersin (Turkey)	
March 13	Seehia Ridard ^{S}	Training camp contract	New York Liberty	Sedis Cadí La Seu (Spain)	
March 20	Alexis Prince ^{W}	Training camp contract	Phoenix Mercury	Elitzur Ramla (Israel)	
March 21	Marine Johannès	Training camp contract	New York Liberty	Çimsa ÇBK Mersin (Turkey)	
March 24	Jillian Alleyne ^{X}	Training camp contract	Indiana Fever	Tarsus Belediyesi Mersin (Turkey)	
April 1	Temi Fágbénlé	One-year deal	Golden State Valkyries		
April 15	Aari McDonald ^{X}	Training camp contract	Los Angeles Sparks		
April 15	Alyssa Ustby ^{X}	Training camp contract	Los Angeles Sparks	North Carolina Tar Heels	
April 16	Tilly Boler ^{X}	Training camp contract	Chicago Sky	Memphis Tigers	
April 16	Sammie Puisis ^{X}	Training camp contract	Chicago Sky	South Florida Bulls	
April 16	Ajae Petty ^{X}	Training camp contract	Minnesota Lynx	Ohio State Buckeyes	
April 16	Reigan Richardson ^{X}	Training camp contract	Minnesota Lynx	Duke Blue Devils	
April 16	Helena Pueyo ^{S}	Training camp contract	Phoenix Mercury	Basket Zaragoza (Spain)	
April 17	Maria Gakdeng ^{X}	Training camp contract	Atlanta Dream	North Carolina Tar Heels	
April 17	Emani Jefferson ^{X}	Training camp contract	Atlanta Dream	Florida Gulf Coast Eagles	
April 17	Jessika Carter ^{X}	Training camp contract	Chicago Sky	Las Vegas Aces	
April 17	Julia Ayrault ^{S}	Training camp contract	Phoenix Mercury	Michigan State Spartans	
April 17	Megan McConnell ^{X}	Training camp contract	Phoenix Mercury	Duquesne Dukes	
April 18	Deja Kelly ^{X}	Training camp contract	Las Vegas Aces	Oregon Ducks	
April 18	Temira Poindexter ^{X}	Training camp contract	Phoenix Mercury	Kansas State Wildcats	
April 19	Khadijiah Cave ^{X}	Training camp contract	Washington Mystics	Botaş SK (Turkey)	
April 19	Morgan Jones ^{X}	Training camp contract	Washington Mystics	MGS Panserraikos Serres (Greece)	
April 19	JoJo Lacey ^{X}	Training camp contract	Washington Mystics	Rutgers Scarlet Knights	
April 19	Ashten Prechtel ^{X}	Training camp contract	Washington Mystics	TFSE-MTK Budapest (Hungary)	
April 19	Jessica Shepard	Training camp contract	Minnesota Lynx	Athinaikos AS Vurona (Greece)	
April 21	Madison Hayes ^{X}	Training camp contract	Connecticut Sun	NC State Wolfpack	
April 21	Morgan Maly ^{X}	Training camp contract	Connecticut Sun	Creighton Bluejays	
April 21	Mamignan Touré ^{X}	Training camp contract	Golden State Valkyries	Spar Girona (Spain)	
April 21	Jordyn Jenkins ^{X}	Training camp contract	Las Vegas Aces	UTSA Roadrunners	
April 22	Annika Soltau ^{S}	Training camp contract	New York Liberty	Rutronik Stars Keltern (Germany)	
April 24	Diamond Johnson ^{X}	Training camp contract	Minnesota Lynx	Norfolk State Spartans	
April 24	Leaonna Odom ^{X}	Training camp contract	New York Liberty		
April 27	DeYona Gaston ^{X}	Training camp contract	Atlanta Dream	Auburn Tigers	

List of free agents signed during training camp / preseason (April 27–May 15)
Date signed	Player	Notes	New team	Former team	Ref.
May 8	Lauren Jensen ^{X}	Training camp contract	Washington Mystics	Creighton Bluejays	
May 11	Bria Hartley	Training camp contract	Connecticut Sun	Athletes Unlimited	

List of free agents signed during regular season (May 16–September 11)
Date signed	Player	Notes	New team	Former team	Ref.
May 20	Liatu King ^{R}	Rest of season hardship contract	Los Angeles Sparks	Free agent	
June 1	Haley Jones ^{W}	Hardship contract	Phoenix Mercury	Atlanta Dream (2024)	
June 1	Aari McDonald ^{R}	Emergency hardship contract	Indiana Fever	Los Angeles Sparks (2024)	
June 2	Jaelyn Brown ^{W}	Rest of season contract	Connecticut Sun	Dallas Wings (2024)	
June 3	Megan McConnell ^{W}	Rest of season contract	Phoenix Mercury	Free agent	
June 6	Maria Kliundikova	Rest of season contract	Minnesota Lynx	Free agent	
June 8	Laeticia Amihere	Rest of season contract	Golden State Valkyries	Atlanta Dream (2024)	
June 10	Aerial Powers ^{W}	Rest of season contract	Golden State Valkyries	Atlanta Dream (2024)	
June 11	Joyner Holmes ^{W}	Rest of season hardship contract	Las Vegas Aces	Seattle Storm (2024)	
June 14	Shey Peddy ^{R}	Rest of season hardship contract	Los Angeles Sparks	Athletes Unlimited	
June 15	Chloe Bibby ^{W}	Rest of season contract	Golden State Valkyries	Free agent	
June 15	Kaitlyn Chen	Rest of season contract	Golden State Valkyries	Free agent	
June 16	Mackenzie Holmes	Rest of season contract	Seattle Storm	Free agent	
June 17	Grace Berger ^{R}	Rest of season hardship contract	Los Angeles Sparks	Indiana Fever (2024)	
June 17	Kaila Charles ^{R}	Emergency hardship contract	Dallas Wings	Free agent	
June 17	Haley Jones ^{R}	Emergency hardship contract	Dallas Wings	Free agent	
June 18	Bree Hall ^{W}	Rest of season contract	Golden State Valkyries	Free agent	
June 25	Aari McDonald	Rest of season contract	Indiana Fever	Free agent	
June 26	Kiana Williams ^{W}	Rest of season contract	Phoenix Mercury	Hefei (China)	
July 2	Liatu King ^{W}	Rest of season contract	Dallas Wings	Free agent	
July 8	DeWanna Bonner	Rest of season contract	Phoenix Mercury	Free agent	
July 9	Haley Jones	Rest of season contract	Dallas Wings	Free agent	
July 10	Tiffany Mitchell	Rest of season contract	Seattle Storm	Free agent	
July 21	Stephanie Talbot	Rest of season contract	New York Liberty	Free agent	
July 28	Sevgi Uzun	Rest of season contract	Chicago Sky	Free agent	
August 1	Chloe Bibby	Rest of season contract	Indiana Fever	Free agent	
August 1	Emma Meesseman	Rest of season contract	New York Liberty	Free agent	
August 5	Haley Peters	Rest of season contract	Connecticut Sun	Free agent	
August 9	Jaylyn Sherrod	Rest of season contract	Minnesota Lynx	Free agent	
August 11	Mamignan Touré	Rest of season contract	Connecticut Sun	Free agent	
August 12	Grace Berger	Rest of season contract	Dallas Wings	Free agent	
August 15	Sika Koné	Rest of season contract	Atlanta Dream	Free agent	
August 18	Zia Cooke	Rest of season contract	Seattle Storm	Free agent	
August 20	Kiana Williams	Rest of season contract	Phoenix Mercury	Free agent	
August 22	Kaila Charles	Rest of season contract	Golden State Valkyries	Free agent	
August 24	Alissa Pili	Rest of season contract	Los Angeles Sparks	Free agent	
August 31	Odyssey Sims	Rest of season contract	Indiana Fever	Free agent	
September 1	Camryn Taylor	Rest of season contract	Minnesota Lynx	Free agent	
September 4	Bree Hall	Rest of season contract	Indiana Fever	Free agent	
September 4	Madison Scott	Rest of season contract	Washington Mystics	Free agent	
September 5	Amy Okonkwo	Rest of season contract	Dallas Wings	Free agent	
September 6	Aerial Powers	Rest of season contract	Indiana Fever	Free agent	
September 9	Shey Peddy	Rest of season contract	Indiana Fever	Free agent	
September 9	Ajae Petty	Rest of season contract	Dallas Wings	Free agent	
September 10	Christyn Williams	Rest of season hardship contract	Dallas Wings	Free agent	

=== 7-day contracts ===
Player (x)	Denotes the number of times the player signed by same team to 7-day contract

Teams were permitted to begin signing players to 7-day contracts after the mid-season cutdown deadline on July 13, 2025.

List of players signed to 7-day contracts during 2025 season
Date Signed	Player	Team	Date Released	Ref.
July 15	Haley Peters	Connecticut Sun	July 22	
July 15	Kiana Williams	Phoenix Mercury	July 22	
July 16	Grace Berger (Note: The Wings signed Berger to 7-day hardship contract.)	Dallas Wings	July 23	
July 21	Mamignan Touré	Connecticut Sun	July 28	
July 22	Marquesha Davis (Note: The Sky signed Davis to 7-day hardship contract.)	Chicago Sky	July 28	
July 22	Haley Peters (2)	Connecticut Sun	July 29	
July 22	Kiana Williams (2)	Phoenix Mercury	July 29	
July 24	Grace Berger (2)	Dallas Wings	July 31	
July 25	Chloe Bibby	Indiana Fever	August 1	
July 28	Mamignan Touré (2)	Connecticut Sun	August 4	
July 28	Yvonne Anderson	Minnesota Lynx	August 4	
July 29	Haley Peters (3)	Connecticut Sun	August 5	
August 1	Kamiah Smalls	Atlanta Dream	August 8	
August 1	Kaila Charles (Note: The Valkyries signed Charles to 7-day hardship contract.)	Golden State Valkyries	August 8	
August 3	Alissa Pili	Los Angeles Sparks	August 10	
August 4	Mamignan Touré (3)	Connecticut Sun	August 11	
August 4	Yvonne Anderson (2)	Minnesota Lynx	August 9	
August 5	Grace Berger (3)	Dallas Wings	August 12	
August 8	Kamiah Smalls (2)	Atlanta Dream	August 13	
August 8	Kaila Charles (2)	Golden State Valkyries	August 15	
August 8	Camryn Taylor	Minnesota Lynx	August 15	
August 10	Alissa Pili (2)	Los Angeles Sparks	August 17	
August 10	Odyssey Sims (Note: The Fever signed Sims to 7-day hardship contract.)	Indiana Fever	August 17	
August 13	Kiana Williams (3)	Phoenix Mercury	August 20	
August 14	Kyra Lambert	Indiana Fever	August 18	
August 14	Madison Scott	Washington Mystics	August 21	
August 15	Kaila Charles (3)	Golden State Valkyries	August 22	
August 15	Camryn Taylor (2)	Minnesota Lynx	August 22	
August 17	Alissa Pili (3)	Los Angeles Sparks	August 24	
August 17	Odyssey Sims (2)	Indiana Fever	August 24	
August 19	Shey Peddy (Note: The Fever signed Peddy to 7-day hardship contract.)	Indiana Fever	August 26	
August 21	Amy Okonkwo (Note: The Wings signed Okonkwo to 7-day hardship contract.)	Dallas Wings	August 28	
August 21	Madison Scott (2)	Washington Mystics	August 28	
August 22	Camryn Taylor (3)	Minnesota Lynx	August 29	
August 23	Aerial Powers (Note: The Fever signed Powers to 7-day hardship contract.)	Indiana Fever	August 30	
August 24	Odyssey Sims (3)	Indiana Fever	August 31	
August 26	Shey Peddy (2)	Indiana Fever	September 2	
August 26	Serena Sundell (Note: The Wings signed Sundell to 7-day hardship contract.)	Dallas Wings	September 2	
August 27	Bree Hall (Note: The Valkyries signed Hall to 7-day hardship contract.)	Golden State Valkyries	September 1	
August 28	Madison Scott (3)	Washington Mystics	September 4	
August 29	Amy Okonkwo (2)	Dallas Wings	September 5	
August 29	Christyn Williams (Note: The Wings signed Willams to 7-day extreme hardship contract.)	Dallas Wings	September 2	
August 30	Aerial Powers (2)	Indiana Fever	September 6	
September 2	Shey Peddy (3)	Indiana Fever	September 9	
September 2	Ajae Petty (Note: The Wings signed Petty to 7-day hardship contract.)	Dallas Wings	September 9	
September 2	Serena Sundell (2)	Dallas Wings	September 4	
September 3	Elizabeth Kitley (Note: The Valkyries signed Kitley to 7-day hardship contract.)	Golden State Valkyries	September 8	
September 3	Christyn Williams (2) (Note: The Wings signed Willams to 7-day hardship contract.)	Dallas Wings	September 10	

=== Waived / released ===
Denotes player who did not clear waivers because was claimed by another team
Denotes player currently on the waiver wire
Denotes player who was released from contract and became free agent

==== Offseason ====
List of players waived during the offseason (September 20–April 26)
Date Waived	Player	Former Team	Ref.
January 4	Stephanie Soares	Dallas Wings	
February 1	Laeticia Amihere	Atlanta Dream	
February 1	Zia Cooke (Note: Cooke later signed training camp contract with the Storm on February 13.)	Los Angeles Sparks	
February 2	Grace Berger	Indiana Fever	
February 3	Victaria Saxton	Indiana Fever	
February 10	Katie Lou Samuelson (Note: Samuelson was waived and signed a mutual contract termination agreement with the Fever.)	Indiana Fever	
February 13	Amy Atwell	Phoenix Mercury	
April 1	Taylor Soule	Washington Mystics	
April 24	Elena Tsineke	Las Vegas Aces	
April 26	Morgan Maly	Connecticut Sun	

==== Training camp / preseason ====
List of players waived during training camp / preseason (April 27–May 15) (Note: Players listed in alphabetical order.)
Atlanta Dream	Chicago Sky	Connecticut Sun	Dallas Wings	Golden State Valkyries
Maria Gakdeng	Morgan Bertsch	Yvonne Anderson	McKenzie Forbes	Laeticia Amihere
DeYona Gaston	Tilly Boler	Caitlin Bickle	Mikiah Herbert Harrigan	Chloe Bibby
Emani Jefferson	Jessika Carter	Kamila Borkowska	Joyner Holmes	Kaitlyn Chen
Ashley Joens	Arella Guirantes	Diamond DeShields	Madison Scott	Elissa Cunane
Haley Jones	Sammie Puisis	Madison Hayes	Aaronette Vonleh	Shyanne Sellers
Shyanne Sellers	Alex Wilson	Mya Hollingshed	Mai Yamamoto	Mamignan Touré
		Abbey Hsu		
Amy Okonkwo
Indiana Fever	Las Vegas Aces	Los Angeles Sparks	Minnesota Lynx	New York Liberty
Jillian Alleyne	Queen Egbo	Liatu King	Grace Berger	Kaitlyn Davis
Jaelyn Brown	Jordyn Jenkins	Masha Kliundikova	Dalayah Daniels	Esmery Martínez
Yvonne Ejim	Deja Kelly	Anneli Maley	Diamond Johnson	Leaonna Odom
Bree Hall	Harmoni Turner	Aari McDonald	Kiara Leslie	
		Shaneice Swain	Ajae Petty	
		Alyssa Ustby	Reigan Richardson	
			Camryn Taylor	
Christyn Williams
Phoenix Mercury	Seattle Storm	Washington Mystics		
Shyla Heal	Madison Conner	Khadijah Cave		
Anna Makurat	Brianna Fraser	Zaay Green		
Megan McConnell	Jordan Hobbs	Lauren Jensen		
Temira Poindexter	Mackenzie Holmes	Morgan Jones		
Celeste Taylor	Serena Sundell	JoJo Lacey		
		Ashten Prechtel		

==== Regular season ====
List of players waived during the regular season (May 16–September 11)
Date Waived	Player	Former Team	Ref.
May 19	Alexis Prince	Phoenix Mercury	
June 2	Robyn Parks	Connecticut Sun	
June 2	Sevgi Uzun	Phoenix Mercury	
June 4	Marième Badiane	Minnesota Lynx	
June 8	Kyara Linskens	Golden State Valkyries	
June 8	Haley Jones	Phoenix Mercury	
June 11	Crystal Bradford	Las Vegas Aces	
June 13	Aari McDonald (Note: The Fever were obligated to release McDonald due to the return of injured players. These returns resulted in the team no longer meeting the WNBA's emergency hardship exception requirements to keep McDonald on their roster.)	Indiana Fever	
June 14	Kaila Charles	Dallas Wings	
June 20	Grace Berger (Note: The Sparks were obligated release this player due to the return of injured players.)	Los Angeles Sparks	
June 25	DeWanna Bonner	Indiana Fever	
June 25	Aerial Powers	Golden State Valkyries	
June 26	Megan McConnell	Phoenix Mercury	
June 29	Haley Jones (Note: The Wings were obligated release this player due to the return of signed players from EuroBasket.)	Dallas Wings	
June 29	Liatu King	Los Angeles Sparks	
June 30	Kaila Charles	Dallas Wings	
June 30	Chloe Bibby	Golden State Valkyries	
June 30	Bree Hall	Golden State Valkyries	
June 30	Julie Vanloo	Golden State Valkyries	
June 30	Elizabeth Kitley	Las Vegas Aces	
June 30	Tiffany Mitchell	Las Vegas Aces	
July 2	Kariata Diaby	Connecticut Sun	
July 2	Shey Peddy	Los Angeles Sparks	
July 2	Odyssey Sims	Los Angeles Sparks	
July 4	Joyner Holmes	Las Vegas Aces	
July 8	Liatu King	Dallas Wings	
July 8	Murjanatu Musa	Phoenix Mercury	
July 10	Kiana Williams	Phoenix Mercury	
July 12	Mercedes Russell	Los Angeles Sparks	
July 12	Alissa Pili	Minnesota Lynx	
July 13	Jaelyn Brown	Connecticut Sun	
July 13	Marquesha Davis	New York Liberty	
July 13	Haley Peters	Connecticut Sun	
July 13	Stephanie Talbot	Golden State Valkyries	
July 28	Moriah Jefferson	Chicago Sky	
August 1	Jaylyn Sherrod	New York Liberty	
August 3	Teaira McCowan	Dallas Wings	
August 5	Zia Cooke	Washington Mystics	
August 5	Sika Koné	Washington Mystics	
August 5	Karlie Samuelson	Dallas Wings	
September 9	Elizabeth Kitley	Golden State Valkyries	

==== Waiver claims ====
List of players awarded off waivers during 2025 season
Date Claimed	Player	New Team	Ref.
February 6	Laeticia Amihere	Golden State Valkyries	
February 7	Grace Berger	Minnesota Lynx	
May 5	Shyanne Sellers	Atlanta Dream	
July 3	Julie Vanloo	Los Angeles Sparks	

=== Contract suspensions ===
List of players suspended during 2025 season
Date Suspended	Player	Reason	Date Set as Active	Team with Player Rights	Ref.
January 21, 2021	María Conde	Contract expired	—	Golden State Valkyries	
January 16, 2022	Maite Cazorla	Contract expired	—	Atlanta Dream	
February 18, 2022	Klara Lundquist	Contract expired	—	Phoenix Mercury	
September 10, 2023	Han Xu	Suspended contract – temporary	—	New York Liberty	
January 22, 2024	Awak Kuier	Personal decision	—	Dallas Wings	
January 24, 2024	Iliana Rupert	Personal decision – Olympics; Contract expired	July 16, 2025	Golden State Valkyries	
January 31, 2024	Jessica Shepard	Prioritization	April 19, 2025	Minnesota Lynx	
May 13, 2024	Julie Allemand	Injury – full season	January 1, 2025	Los Angeles Sparks	
February 24, 2025	Lou Lopez Sénéchal	Personal decision – full season	—	Dallas Wings	
February 25, 2025	Kristy Wallace	Personal decision – full season	—	Indiana Fever	
April 7, 2025	Holly Winterburn	Personal decision / injury – full season	—	Atlanta Dream	
April 17, 2025	Jordan Horston	Injury – full season	—	Seattle Storm	
April 17, 2025	Nika Mühl	Injury – full season	—	Seattle Storm	
April 21, 2025	Raquel Carrera	Personal decision – full season	—	New York Liberty	
April 21, 2025	Seehia Ridard	Personal decision – full season	—	New York Liberty	
April 25, 2025	Julia Ayrault	Personal decision – full season	—	Phoenix Mercury	
May 9, 2025	Helena Pueyo	Personal decision – full season	—	Phoenix Mercury	
May 10, 2025	Dorka Juhász	Personal decision – full season	—	Minnesota Lynx	
May 13, 2025	Annika Soltau	Full season	—	New York Liberty	
May 14, 2025	Betnijah Laney-Hamilton	Non-WNBA injury – full season	—	New York Liberty	
May 15, 2025	Luisa Geiselsöder	Suspended contract – temporary	May 18, 2025	Dallas Wings	
June 14, 2025	Luisa Geiselsöder	Suspended contract – temporary	June 30, 2025	Dallas Wings	
May 15, 2025	Leïla Lacan	Suspended contract – temporary	July 2, 2025	Connecticut Sun	
May 15, 2025	Murjanatu Musa	Suspended contract – temporary	May 19, 2025	Phoenix Mercury	
June 7, 2025	Teaira McCowan	Suspended contract – temporary	June 30, 2025	Dallas Wings	
June 8, 2025	Cecilia Zandalasini	Suspended contract – temporary	June 30, 2025	Golden State Valkyries	
June 10, 2025	Julie Allemand	Suspended contract – temporary	July 1, 2025	Los Angeles Sparks	
June 10, 2025	Jessica Shepard	Suspended contract – temporary	June 23, 2025	Minnesota Lynx	
June 10, 2025	Julie Vanloo	Suspended contract – temporary	July 3, 2025	Golden State Valkyries	
June 11, 2025	Janelle Salaün	Suspended contract – temporary	June 30, 2025	Golden State Valkyries	
June 12, 2025	Leonie Fiebich	Suspended contract – temporary	June 30, 2025	New York Liberty	
June 15, 2025	Temi Fágbénlé	Suspended contract – temporary	June 25, 2025	Golden State Valkyries	
June 25, 2025	Kamilla Cardoso	Suspended contract – temporary	July 9, 2025	Chicago Sky	
June 25, 2025	Damiris Dantas	Suspended contract – temporary	July 9, 2025	Indiana Fever	
July 18, 2025	Sika Koné	Suspended contract – temporary	— (Note: Koné was waived by the Mystics on August 5)	Washington Mystics	

=== Inactive players ===
List of players set as inactive during the 2025 season
Date Set Inactive	Player	Reason	Date Activated	Team	Ref.
May 15	Cheyenne Parker-Tyus	Pregnancy/childbirth	September 8	Las Vegas Aces	

=== Rights renounced ===
List of WNBA players whose rights were renounced in 2024 offseason or 2025 regular season
Date Renounced	Player	Team	Ref.
December 30	Marica Gajić	Washington Mystics	
December 31	Kaitlyn Davis	New York Liberty	
December 31	Raquel Carrera	New York Liberty	
March 19	Paige Robinson	Dallas Wings	
April 1	Kedra Holland-Corn	Dallas Wings	

== Draft ==
The 2025 draft took place on April 14, 2025 at The Shed in Manhattan.

*	Denotes player who has been selected for at least one All-Star Game and All-WNBA Team
^{+}	Denotes player who has been selected for at least one All-Star Game
^{#}	Denotes player who never played in the WNBA regular season or playoffs
**Bold**	Denotes player who won Rookie of the Year

=== First round ===
Pick	Player	Nationality	Team	School / club team
1	**Paige Bueckers** *	United States	Dallas Wings	UConn
2	Dominique Malonga ^{+}	France	Seattle Storm (from Los Angeles) (Note: February 1, 2025: Three-team trade among Las Vegas, Los Angeles, and Seattle: Las Vegas acquired Jewell Loyd (from Seattle) and a 2025 second-round pick (from Los Angeles); Los Angeles acquired Kelsey Plum, 2025 first-round and 2026 second-round picks (from Las Vegas); Seattle acquired the rights to Li Yueru and a 2025 first-round pick (from Los Angeles), and a 2026 first-round pick (from Las Vegas))	ASVEL Féminin
3	Sonia Citron ^{+}	United States	Washington Mystics (from Chicago) (Note: February 23, 2025: Chicago to Washington: Chicago acquired Ariel Atkins; Washington acquired a 2025 first-round pick, a 2027 second-round pick, and the rights to swap 2027 first-round draft picks)	Notre Dame
4	Kiki Iriafen ^{+}	United States	Washington Mystics	USC
5	Justė Jocytė	Lithuania	Golden State Valkyries	ASVEL Féminin
6	Georgia Amoore	Australia	Washington Mystics (from Atlanta via Dallas) (Note: January 21, 2023: Atlanta to Dallas: Atlanta acquired Allisha Gray; Dallas acquired 2023 and 2025 first-round picks) (Note: April 10, 2023: Dallas to Washington: Dallas acquired the rights to Stephanie Soares; Washington acquired 2024 second-round and (from Atlanta) 2025 first-round picks)	Kentucky
7	Aneesah Morrow	United States	Connecticut Sun (from Phoenix via New York) (Note: February 11, 2023: Four-team trade among Chicago, Dallas, New York, and Phoenix: Chicago acquired Marina Mabrey and a 2024 second-round pick (from Phoenix); New York acquired rights to Leonie Fiebich, a 2024 second-round pick (from Chicago), and the right to swap 2025 first-round picks (from Phoenix); Phoenix acquired Michaela Onyenwere, 2024 third-round and 2025 second-round picks (from Chicago); Dallas acquired Diamond DeShields, 2023 and 2024 first-round picks, and the right to swap 2025 first-round picks (from Chicago)) (Note: March 16, 2025: New York to Connecticut: New York acquired Natasha Cloud; Connecticut acquired 2025 No. 7 draft pick and 2026 first round draft pick)	LSU
8	Saniya Rivers	United States	Connecticut Sun (from Indiana) (Note: February 2, 2025: Four-team trade among Connecticut, Dallas, Indiana, and Phoenix: Connecticut acquired Natasha Cloud, Rebecca Allen (from Phoenix), Jacy Sheldon (from Dallas), and a 2025 first-round pick (from Indiana); Dallas acquired DiJonai Carrington, Tyasha Harris, the right to swap 2026 second-round picks (from Connecticut), NaLyssa Smith, the right to swap 2027 third-round picks (from Indiana), the rights to Mikiah Herbert Harrigan, and a 2025 first-round pick (from Phoenix); Indiana acquired Jaelyn Brown (from Dallas), Sophie Cunningham, and a 2025 second-round pick (from Phoenix); Phoenix acquired Alyssa Thomas (from Connecticut), Satou Sabally, Kalani Brown, and Sevgi Uzun (from Dallas))	NC State
9	Sarah Ashlee Barker	United States	Los Angeles Sparks (from Seattle)	Alabama
Las Vegas Aces (forfeited due to league rules violations)
10	Ajša Sivka ^{#}	Slovenia	Chicago Sky (from Connecticut) (Note: July 17, 2024: Chicago to Connecticut: Connecticut acquired Marina Mabrey and a 2025 second-round pick; Chicago acquired Rachel Banham, Moriah Jefferson, a 2025 first-round pick, and the right to swap 2026 first-round picks)	Tarbes Gespe Bigorre
11	Hailey Van Lith	United States	Chicago Sky (from Minnesota) (Note: April 13, 2025: Minnesota to Chicago: Chicago acquired 2025 No. 11 draft pick; Minnesota acquired outright 2026 first-round draft pick)	TCU
12	Aziaha James	United States	Dallas Wings (from New York via Phoenix)	NC State

=== Second round ===
Pick	Player	Nationality	Team	School / club team
13	Aaliyah Nye	United States	Las Vegas Aces (from Los Angeles)	Alabama
14	Madison Scott	United States	Dallas Wings	Ole Miss
15	Anastasiia Kosu	Russia	Minnesota Lynx (from Chicago via 3 trades) (Note: February 6, 2024: Phoenix to Chicago: Phoenix acquired Kahleah Copper and Morgan Bertsch; Chicago acquired Brianna Turner, Michaela Onyenwere, 2024 and 2026 first-round picks, the right to swap 2026 second-round picks, and reacquired its own 2025 second-round pick) (Note: April 14, 2024: Chicago to Minnesota: Chicago acquired a 2024 first-round pick and Nikolina Milić; Minnesota acquired a 2024 first-round pick, Sika Koné, a 2025 second-round pick, and the right to swap 2026 first-round picks)	UMMC Ekaterinburg
16	Maddy Westbeld	United States	Chicago Sky (from Washington via Las Vegas) (Note: February 5, 2023: Washington to Las Vegas: Las Vegas acquired 2024 and 2025 second-round picks; Washington acquired the rights to Amanda Zahui B.) (Note: February 7, 2025: Las Vegas to Chicago: Chicago acquired 2025 second-round picks; Las Vegas acquired Dana Evans)	Notre Dame
17	Shyanne Sellers	United States	Golden State Valkyries	Maryland
18	Te-Hina Paopao	United States	Atlanta Dream	South Carolina
19	Makayla Timpson	United States	Indiana Fever (from Phoenix)	Florida State
20	Bree Hall	United States	Indiana Fever	South Carolina
21	Sania Feagin	United States	Los Angeles Sparks (from Seattle) (Note: February 14, 2025: Seattle to Los Angeles: Los Angeles acquired 2025 and 2027 second-round picks; Seattle acquired Lexie Brown and a 2025 third-round pick)	South Carolina
22	Aicha Coulibaly	Mali	Chicago Sky (from Las Vegas)	Texas A&M
23	Lucy Olsen	United States	Washington Mystics (from Connecticut) (Note: May 7, 2024: Connecticut to Washington: Washington acquired Bernadett Határ and a 2025 second-round pick; Connecticut acquired Queen Egbo)	Iowa
24	Dalayah Daniels ^{#}	United States	Minnesota Lynx	Washington
25	Rayah Marshall	United States	Connecticut Sun (from New York via Chicago) (Note: March 14, 2024: New York to Chicago: Chicago acquired 2025 and 2026 second-round picks; New York acquired Rebekah Gardner)	USC

=== Third round ===
Pick	Player	Nationality	Team	School / club team
26	Serena Sundell	United States	Seattle Storm (from Los Angeles)	Kansas State
27	JJ Quinerly	United States	Dallas Wings	West Virginia
28	Liatu King	United States	Los Angeles Sparks (from Chicago) (Note: February 19, 2024: Los Angeles to Chicago: Los Angeles acquired Julie Allemand, the rights to Li Yueru, and a 2025 third-round pick; Chicago acquired a 2024 first-round pick)	Notre Dame
29	Madison Conner ^{#}	United States	Seattle Storm (from Washington) (Note: May 11, 2024: Washington to Seattle: Seattle acquired a 2025 third-round pick; Washington acquired Jade Melbourne)	TCU
30	Kaitlyn Chen	United States	Golden State Valkyries	UConn
31	Aaronette Vonleh ^{#}	United States	Dallas Wings (from Atlanta) (Note: May 4, 2024: Atlanta to Dallas: Dallas acquired a 2025 third-round pick; Atlanta acquired Crystal Dangerfield)	Baylor
32	Zaay Green	United States	Washington Mystics (from Phoenix) (Note: August 20, 2024: Phoenix to Washington: Washington acquired Sug Sutton and a 2025 third-round pick; Phoenix acquired the rights to Klara Lundquist)	Alabama
33	Yvonne Ejim ^{#}	Canada	Indiana Fever	Gonzaga
34	Jordan Hobbs ^{#}	United States	Seattle Storm	Michigan
35	Harmoni Turner ^{#}	United States	Las Vegas Aces	Harvard
36	Taylor Thierry	United States	Atlanta Dream (from Connecticut) (Note: May 16, 2023: Connecticut to Atlanta: Connecticut acquired Leigha Brown; Atlanta acquired a 2025 third-round pick)	Ohio State
37	Aubrey Griffin	United States	Minnesota Lynx	UConn
38	Adja Kane ^{#}	France	New York Liberty	Landerneau Bretagne Basket

=== Previous years' unsigned draftees ===
List of previously unsigned draftees under contract for 2025 season
Date Signed to Rookie Contract	Player	Draft	Pick	Team	Previous Team	Outcome	Ref.
February 3	Elizabeth Kitley	2024	24	Las Vegas Aces	Virginia Tech Hokies (NCAA)	Made opening day roster Waived by the Aces on June 30	
February 5	Shaneice Swain ^{#}	2023	14	Los Angeles Sparks	Sydney Flames (Australia)	Waived by the Sparks on May 15	
February 8	Leïla Lacan	2024	10	Connecticut Sun	Basket Landes (France)	Temporarily suspended on May 15; Set as active on July 2	
February 13	Mackenzie Holmes	2024	26	Seattle Storm	Indiana Hoosiers (NCAA)	Waived by the Storm on May 12; Re-signed with the Storm on June 16	
February 17	Abbey Hsu ^{#}	2024	34	Connecticut Sun	Columbia Lions (NCAA)	Waived by the Sun on April 28	
February 21	Carla Leite	2024	9	Golden State Valkyries (Note: Rights to Leite were acquired by Golden State during the 2024 WNBA expansion draft.)	Villeneuve-d'Ascq (France)	Made opening day roster	
