= Quinerly =

Quinerly is a surname. Notable people with the surname include:

- Jahvon Quinerly (born 1998), American basketball player
- JJ Quinerly (born 2002), American basketball player
