= Big 12 Conference Women's Basketball Defensive Player of the Year =

Big 12 Conference Women's Basketball Freshman of the Year
- Awarded for: the top women's basketball defensive player in the Big 12 Conference
- Country: United States
- Presented by: Phillips 66
- First award: 2006
- Currently held by: Jordan Harrison, West Virginia

The Big 12 Conference Women's Basketball Defensive Player of the Year is an annual college basketball award presented to the top women's basketball defensive player in the Big 12 Conference.

Four players have won the award more than once. Lauren Cox of Baylor and JJ Quinerly of West Virginia have won twice, Courtney Paris of Oklahoma won three times, and Brittney Griner of Baylor won four times. The award was shared three times. It went to Abiola Wabara and Courtney Paris in 2006, Brittney Griner and Yvonne Turner in 2010, and Imani McGee-Stafford and Brittney Martin in 2016.

Baylor has won the most awards with 9.

== Key ==
†	Co-Player of the Year
C	Coaches selection
M	Media selection

== Winners ==
Season	Player	School	Source(s)
2005–06	Abiola Wabara †	Baylor	
2005–06	Courtney Paris †	Oklahoma	
2006–07	Courtney Paris (2)	Oklahoma	
2007–08	Courtney Paris (3)	Oklahoma	
2008–09	Danielle Gant	Texas A&M	
2009–10	Brittney Griner †	Baylor	
2009–10	Yvonne Turner †	Nebraska	
2010–11	Brittney Griner (2)	Baylor	
2011–12	Brittney Griner (3)	Baylor	
2012–13	Brittney Griner (4)	Baylor	
2013–14	Odyssey Sims	Baylor	
2014–15	Chelsea Prince	TCU	
2015–16	Imani McGee-Stafford †	Texas	
2015–16	Brittney Martin †	Oklahoma State	
2016–17	Brianna Taylor	Texas	
2017–18	Lauren Cox	Baylor	
2018–19	Lauren Cox (2)	Baylor	
2019–20	DiDi Richards	Baylor	
2020–21	Natasha Mack	Oklahoma State	
2021–22	Lexi Donarski	Iowa State	
2022–23	Rori Harmon	Texas	
2023–24	JJ Quinerly	West Virginia	
2024–25	JJ Quinerly (2)	West Virginia	
2025–26	Jordan Harrison	West Virginia	

== Winners by school ==
School (year joined) (Note: Reflects the calendar year in which the school joined the Big 12.)	Winners	Years (Note: Reflects the calendar year in which the basketball season ends.)
Baylor (1996)	9	2006, 2010, 2011, 2012, 2013, 2014, 2018, 2019, 2020
Oklahoma (1996) (Note: Oklahoma and Texas left for the SEC in 2024.)	3	2006, 2007, 2008
Texas (1996)	3	2016, 2017, 2023
West Virginia (2012)	3	2024, 2025, 2026
Oklahoma State (1996)	2	2016, 2021
Iowa State (1996)	1	2022
Nebraska (1996) (Note: Nebraska left in 2011 to join the Big Ten.)	1	2010
Texas A&M (1996) (Note: Missouri and Texas A&M left in 2012 to join the SEC.)	1	2009
TCU (2012)	1	2015
Kansas State (1996)	0	—
Texas Tech (1996)	0	—
Kansas (1996)	0	—
Arizona (2024)	0	—
Arizona State (2024)	0	—
BYU (2023)	0	—
Cincinnati (2023)	0	—
Colorado (1996/2024) (Note: Colorado left in 2011 to join what is now known as the Pac-12, but rejoined the Big 12 in 2024.)	0	—
Houston (2023)	0	—
Missouri (1996)	0	—
UCF (2023)	0	—
Utah (2024)	0	—
