= 2025 Dallas Wings season =

- Head coach: Chris Koclanes
- Arena: College Park Center

Results
- Record: 10–34 (.227)
- Place: 7th (Western)
- Playoff finish: Did not qualify

The 2025 Dallas Wings season was the franchise's 28th season in the Women's National Basketball Association, the 10th season for the franchise in Dallas - after relocating from Tulsa and Detroit, and the first season under head coach Chris Koclanes.

In May 2025, it was announced that Teaira McCowan and Luisa Geiselsöder would be participating in the 2025 FIBA Women’s Eurobasket competition, for Türkiye and Germany respectively, and would be temporarily suspended during their time playing in the tournament. At the time of announcement, McCowan was expected to unavailable to play for the Wings from June 7–July 3, and Geiselsöder June 14–July 3.

On June 10, the Wings announced that Tyasha Harris underwent an unspecified surgery on her left knee and would be out for the remainder of the 2025 season. On June 16, they also announced Maddy Siegrist was diagnosed with a right anterolateral tibial plateau fracture that occurred during the Wings' June 11 game against the Phoenix Mercury. They also announced that Siegrist's injury would not require surgery and anticipated she would to return to play later in the 2025 season.

== Draft ==
Round	Pick	Player	Position	Nationality	College/Club	Outcome	Ref.
1	1	Paige Bueckers	G	United States	UConn	Signed rookie contract on April 22; Made opening day roster	
1	12	Aziaha James	G	United States	NC State	Signed rookie contract on April 17; Made opening day roster	
2	14	Madison Scott	F	United States	Ole Miss	Signed rookie contract on April 17; Waived on May 10	
3	27	JJ Quinerly	G	United States	West Virginia	Signed rookie contract on April 17; Made opening day roster	
3	31	Aaronette Vonleh	C	United States	Baylor	Signed rookie contract on April 17; Waived on May 6	

== Transactions ==
=== Front office and coaching ===
Date	Details	Ref.
October 18, 2024	Fired head coach, Latricia Trammell	
November 8, 2024	Hired Curt Miller as executive vice president and general manager (GM)	
November 8, 2024	Promoted Travis Charles to senior vice president of basketball operations and assistant GM	
November 8, 2024	Promoted Jasmine Thomas to vice president of basketball operations and assistant GM	
December 23, 2024	Hired Chris Koclanes as head coach	
January 13, 2025	Hired Camille Smith and Nola Henry as assistant coaches	
January 24, 2025	Hired Lauryn Turner as Chief Operating Officer	
January 27, 2025	Announced multiple front office promotions	
February 6, 2025	Hired Belle Koclanes as assistant coach	
February 6, 2025	Hired Addison Lee as director of basketball analytics and strategy	
March 4, 2025	Hired Jhared Simpson as Director of Player Development	

=== Trades ===
February
February 2 (Four-team trade)	To Dallas Wings DiJonai Carrington and Tyasha Harris (from Connecticut Sun); NaLyssa Smith and right to swap third round picks in 2027 draft (from Indiana Fever); Rights to Mikiah Herbert Harrigan and the 2025 No. 12 pick (from Phoenix Mercury)	To Connecticut Sun Rebecca Allen and Natasha Cloud (from Phoenix Mercury); Jacy Sheldon (from Dallas Wings); 2025 No. 8 draft pick (from Indiana Fever)
February 2 (Four-team trade)	To Indiana Fever Sophie Cunningham and the 2025 No. 19 pick (from Phoenix Mercury); Jaelyn Brown (from Dallas Wings)	To Phoenix Mercury Alyssa Thomas (from Connecticut Sun); Satou Sabally, Kalani Brown, and Sevgi Uzun (from Dallas Wings)
June
June 14	To Dallas Wings Li Yueru	To Seattle Storm 2026 second round draft pick (with right to swap with the Connecticut Sun); 2027 third round pick (with right to swap with the Indiana Fever)
June 30	To Dallas Wings 2027 first round pick	To Las Vegas Aces NaLyssa Smith
August
August 3	To Dallas Wings Diamond Miller; Karlie Samuelson; 2027 second round pick (Minnesota’s own)	To Minnesota Lynx DiJonai Carrington

=== Free agency ===
==== Core designation ====
Player	Date	Notes	Ref.
Satou Sabally	January 13, 2025	Traded to Phoenix Mercury on February 2	

==== Re-signed / extensions ====
Player	Date	Notes	Ref.
Jaelyn Brown	January 13	Training camp contract Traded to Indiana Fever on February 2	
Sevgi Uzun	January 22	Training camp contract Traded to Phoenix Mercury on February 2	
Maddy Siegrist	May 6	Exercised team option (Fourth-year)	
Luisa Geiselsöder	May 18	Set as active	
Luisa Geiselsöder	June 30	Set as active	
Teaira McCowan	June 30	Set as active	

==== Additions ====
Player	Date	Notes	Former Team	Ref.
Myisha Hines-Allen	February 2	One-year deal	Minnesota Lynx	
Luisa Geiselsöder	February 2	Training camp contract	Basket Landes	
Joyner Holmes	February 2	Training camp contract	Seattle Storm	
Kaila Charles	February 2	Training camp contract	Diósgyőri VTK	
Kaila Charles	June 17	Emergency hardship contract	Free agent	
Mai Yamamoto	February 5	Training camp contract	Toyota Antelopes	
Mikiah Herbert Harrigan	February 18	Training camp contract	N/A (Note: Wings inherited exclusive negotiating rights for Herbert Harrigan from Phoenix Mercury via trade on February 2)	
McKenzie Forbes	February 28	Training camp contract	Mainland Pouakai	
Aziaha James	April 17	Rookie contract (2025 draft pick – No. 12)	NC State Wolfpack	
JJ Quinerly	April 17	Rookie contract (2025 draft pick – No. 27)	West Virginia Mountaineers	
Madison Scott	April 17	Rookie contract (2025 draft pick – No. 14)	Ole Miss Rebels	
Aaronette Vonleh	April 17	Rookie contract (2025 draft pick – No. 31)	Baylor Bears	
Paige Bueckers	April 22	Rookie contract (2025 draft pick – No. 1)	UConn Huskies	
Haley Jones	June 17	Emergency hardship contract	Free agent	
Haley Jones	July 9	Rest of season contract	Free agent	
Liatu King	July 2	Rest of season contract	Free agent	
Grace Berger	July 16	7-day hardship contract (Note: The Wings were permitted to sign player to this type of contract due to roster hardship at the time of Berger's signing (Siegrist and Harris out with injury).)	Free agent	
Grace Berger	July 24	7-day contract	Free agent	
Grace Berger	August 5	7-day contract	Free agent	
Grace Berger	August 12	Rest of season contract	Free agent	
Amy Okonkwo	August 21	7-day hardship contract	Free agent	
Amy Okonkwo	August 29	7-day hardship contract	Free agent	
Amy Okonkwo	September 5	Rest of season contract	Free agent	
Serena Sundell	August 26	7-day hardship contract	Free agent	
Serena Sundell	September 2	7-day hardship contract	Free agent	
Christyn Williams	August 29	7-day extreme hardship contract	Free agent	
Christyn Williams	September 3	7-day hardship contract	Free agent	
Christyn Williams	September 10	Rest of season hardship contract	Free agent	
Ajae Petty	September 2	7-day hardship contract	Free agent	
Ajae Petty	September 9	Rest of season contract	Free agent	

=== Subtractions / unsigned ===
Player	Date	Reason	New Team	Ref.
Awak Kuier	January 22, 2024	Suspended contract – expired	—	
Carla Leite	December 6, 2024	Expansion draft	Golden State Valkyries	
Stephanie Soares	January 4, 2025	Waived	—	
Natasha Howard	February 3, 2025	Free agency – uncoreable unrestricted	Indiana Fever	
Lou Lopez Sénéchal	February 24, 2025	Suspended contract – full season	N/A – retained rights	
Paige Robinson	March 19, 2025	Renounced rights	—	
Kedra Holland-Corn	April 1, 2025	Renounced rights	—	
McKenzie Forbes	May 3, 2025	Waived	—	
Mikiah Herbert Harrigan	May 3, 2025	Waived	—	
Aaronette Vonleh	May 6, 2025	Waived	—	
Madison Scott	May 10, 2025	Waived	Washington Mystics	
Mai Yamamoto	May 10, 2025	Waived	—	
Joyner Holmes	May 14, 2025	Waived	Las Vegas Aces	
Luisa Geiselsöder	May 15, 2025	Suspended contract – temporary	N/A – retained rights	
Luisa Geiselsöder	June 14, 2025	Suspended contract – temporary	N/A – retained rights	
Teaira McCowan	June 7, 2025	Suspended contract – temporary	N/A – retained rights	
Kaila Charles	June 14, 2025	Waived	—	
Kaila Charles	June 30, 2025	Released (Note: The Wings were obligated release players due to the return of other signed players from EuroBasket.)	—	
Haley Jones	June 29, 2025	Released	—	
Liatu King	July 8	Waived	—	
Grace Berger	July 23	Released — end of 7-day contract	—	
Grace Berger	July 31	Released — end of 7-day contract	—	
Teaira McCowan	August 3	Waived	—	
Karlie Samuelson	August 5	Waived	—	
Amy Okonkwo	August 28	Released	—	
Serena Sundell	September 3	Released	—	

== Roster ==
2025 Dallas Wings roster
Players
Coaches

Pos.	No.	Nat.	Name	Height	Weight	DOB	From	Yrs
G	34	(United States)	Berger, Grace	5' 11" (1.8m)	163 lb (74kg)	1999-06-03	Indiana	2
G	5	(United States)	Bueckers, Paige	6' 0" (1.83m)	141 lb (64kg)	2001-10-20	Connecticut	R
C	18	(Germany)	Geiselsöder, Luisa	6' 4" (1.93m)		2000-02-10	Germany	R
G	52	(United States)	Harris, Tyasha (injured)	5' 10" (1.78m)	152 lb (69kg)	1998-05-01	South Carolina	5
F	2	(United States)	Hines-Allen, Myisha	6' 1" (1.85m)	200 lb (91kg)	1995-05-30	Louisville	7
G	10	(United States)	James, Aziaha	5' 10" (1.78m)		2002-11-19	NC State	R
G/F	30	(United States)	Jones, Haley	6' 1" (1.85m)	187 lb (85kg)	2001-05-23	Stanford	2
C	28	(China)	Li Yueru (injured)	6' 7" (2.01m)		1999-03-28	China	2
G	1	(United States)	Miller, Diamond	6' 3" (1.91m)	178 lb (81kg)	2001-02-11	Maryland	2
G	24	(United States)	Ogunbowale, Arike (injured)	5' 8" (1.73m)	165 lb (75kg)	1997-03-02	Notre Dame	6
F	0	(Nigeria)	Okonkwo, Amy	6' 2" (1.88m)	146 lb (66kg)	1996-08-26	TCU	R
F/C	3	(United States)	Petty, Ajae	6' 2" (1.88m)	190 lb (86kg)	2002-09-04	Ohio State	R
G	11	(United States)	Quinerly, JJ (injured)	5' 8" (1.73m)		2002-10-24	West Virginia	R
F	20	(United States)	Siegrist, Maddy	6' 2" (1.88m)	175 lb (79kg)	2000-05-22	Villanova	2
G	31	(United States)	Williams, Christyn	5' 11" (1.8m)	166 lb (75kg)	2000-05-20	Connecticut	R
F/C	–	(Finland)	Kuier, Awak (S)	6' 4" (1.93m)	168 lb (76kg)	2001-08-19	Finland	3
G	–	(Mexico)	Lopez Sénéchal, Lou (S)	6' 1" (1.85m)	155 lb (70kg)	1998-05-12	Connecticut	1

Head coach
(United States) Chris Koclanes (Old Dominion)
Assistant coaches
(United States) Nola Henry (College of Charleston)
(United States) Belle Koclanes (Richmond)
(United States) Camille Smith (North Carolina)
Player development
(United States) Jhared Simpson (Wheeling)
Athletic trainer
(United States) Branay Hicks (UT Tyler)

Legend

- (C) Team captain
- (DP) Unsigned draft pick
- (FA) Free agent
- (S) Suspended
- Injured

=== Depth ===
Pos.	Starter	Bench
PG	Paige Bueckers	Tyasha Harris; Aziaha James; Grace Berger
SG	Arike Ogunbowale	Haley Jones; Diamond Miller; JJ Quinerly; Christyn Williams
SF	Myisha Hines-Allen	Ajae Petty
PF	Maddy Siegrist	Amy Okonkwo
C	Luisa Geiselsöder	Li Yueru

== Schedule ==
=== Preseason ===
2025 pre-season game log
Total: 1–1 (Home: 1–0; Road: 0–1)
May: 1–1 (Home: 1–0; Road: 0–1)

Game	Date	Team	Score	High points	High rebounds	High assists	Location Attendance	Record
1	May 2	@ Las Vegas	L 78–112	JJ Quinerly (16)	DiJonai Carrington (5)	Myisha Hines-Allen (5)	Purcell Pavilion; 7,602	0–1
2	May 10	Toyota Antelopes	W 119–52	Paige Bueckers (15)	NaLyssa Smith (7)	Bueckers, Ogunbowale (6)	College Park Center; 6,251	1–1

2025 pre-season schedule

=== Regular season ===
2025 game log
Total: 10–34 (Home: 6–16; Road: 4–18)
May: 1–6 (Home: 0–3; Road: 1–3)

Game	Date	Team	Score	High points	High rebounds	High assists	Location Attendance	Record
1	May 16	Minnesota	L 84–99	Arike Ogunbowale (16)	Paige Bueckers (7)	Arike Ogunbowale (4)	College Park Center; 6,251	0–1
2	May 19	Seattle	L 71–79	Paige Bueckers (19)	Hines-Allen, McCowan (9)	Paige Bueckers (8)	College Park Center; 6,137	0–2
3	May 21	@ Minnesota	L 81–85	Arike Ogunbowale (21)	Myisha Hines-Allen (7)	Paige Bueckers (10)	Target Center; 12,772	0–3
4	May 24	@ Atlanta	L 75–83	NaLyssa Smith (13)	Maddy Siegrist (9)	Paige Bueckers (5)	Gateway Center Arena; 3,265	0–4
5	May 27	@ Connecticut	W 109–87	Paige Bueckers (21)	Myisha Hines-Allen (7)	Paige Bueckers (7)	Mohegan Sun Arena; 8,910	1–4
6	May 29	@ Chicago	L 92–97	Arike Ogunbowale (37)	Teaira McCowan (8)	Paige Bueckers (8)	Wintrust Arena; 9,025	1–5
7	May 31	Chicago	L 83–94	NaLyssa Smith (20)	Maddy Siegrist (8)	DiJonai Carrington (6)	College Park Center; 6,251	1–6

June : 4–7 (Home: 3–3; Road: 1–4)

Game	Date	Team	Score	High points	High rebounds	High assists	Location Attendance	Record
8	June 3	@ Seattle	L 77–83	DiJonai Carrington (22)	Myisha Hines-Allen (12)	DiJonai Carrington (4)	Climate Pledge Arena; 10,252	1–7
9	June 6	Los Angeles	L 79–93	DiJonai Carrington (16)	Luisa Geiselsöder (10)	Luisa Geiselsöder (6)	College Park Center; 5,007	1–8
10	June 8	Minnesota	L 65–81	Arike Ogunbowale (26)	Maddy Siegrist (11)	Arike Ogunbowale (6)	College Park Center; 6,162	1–9
11	June 11	@ Phoenix	L 80–93	Paige Bueckers (35)	DiJonai Carrington (8)	Bueckers, Carrington, Ogunbowale (4)	PHX Arena; 13,001	1–10
12	June 13	@ Las Vegas	L 84–88	Arike Ogunbowale (26)	DiJonai Carrington (8)	Arike Ogunbowale (8)	Michelob Ultra Arena; 10,428	1–11
13	June 17	Golden State	W 80–71	Paige Bueckers (20)	NaLyssa Smith (10)	Arike Ogunbowale (6)	College Park Center; 6,061	2–11
14	June 20	@ Connecticut	W 86–83	Paige Bueckers (21)	Carrington, Yueru (9)	Paige Bueckers (7)	Mohegan Sun Arena; 8,910	3–11
15	June 22	@ Washington	L 88–91 (OT)	Arike Ogunbowale (27)	Bueckers, Smith (9)	Paige Bueckers (7)	CareFirst Arena; 4,200	3–12
16	June 24	Atlanta	W 68–55	Arike Ogunbowale (21)	Li Yueru (15)	Bueckers, Ogunbowale (4)	College Park Center; 6,251	4–12
17	June 27	Indiana	L 86–94	Paige Bueckers (27)	NaLyssa Smith (10)	Paige Bueckers (6)	American Airlines Center; 20,409	4–13
18	June 28	Washington	W 79–71	James, Quinerly (15)	Jones, Smith (7)	Myisha Hines-Allen (5)	College Park Center; 6,006	5–13

July : 3–7 (Home: 2–2; Road: 1–5)

Game	Date	Team	Score	High points	High rebounds	High assists	Location Attendance	Record
19	July 3	Phoenix	W 98–89	Aziaha James (28)	Li Yueru (7)	JJ Quinerly (7)	College Park Center; 6,162	6–13
20	July 7	@ Phoenix	L 72–102	JJ Quinerly (18)	Teaira McCowan (10)	JJ Quinerly (5)	PHX Arena; 11,932	6–14
21	July 9	@ Chicago	L 76–87	Li Yueru (18)	Li Yueru (10)	JJ Quinerly (5)	Wintrust Arena; 9,025	6–15
22	July 13	@ Indiana	L 83–102	Paige Bueckers (21)	Geiselsöder, Hines-Allen (7)	Bueckers, Ogunbowale, Quinerly (4)	Gainbridge Fieldhouse; 17,274	6–16
23	July 16	Las Vegas	L 86–90	Paige Bueckers (20)	Li Yueru (8)	Paige Bueckers (8)	College Park Center; 6,153	6–17
All-Star Game
24	July 22	@ Seattle	W 87–63	Arike Ogunbowale (20)	Li Yueru (10)	Bueckers, Jones (6)	Climate Pledge Arena; 12,500	7–17
25	July 25	@ Golden State	L 76–86	Paige Bueckers (17)	Luisa Geiselsöder (9)	Paige Bueckers (6)	Chase Center; 18,024	7–18
26	July 27	Las Vegas	L 80–106	Arike Ogunbowale (18)	Teaira McCowan (13)	JJ Quinerly (5)	College Park Center; 6,251	7–19
27	July 28	New York	W 92–82	Bueckers, Ogunbowale (20)	DiJonai Carrington (9)	Arike Ogunbowale (14)	College Park Center; 6,018	8–19
28	July 30	Atlanta	L 85–88	Paige Bueckers (21)	Geiselsöder, Hines-Allen (4)	Paige Bueckers (7)	College Park Center; 5,228	8–20

August : 1–11 (Home: 0–7; Road: 1–4)

Game	Date	Team	Score	High points	High rebounds	High assists	Location Attendance	Record
29	August 1	Indiana	L 78–88	Paige Bueckers (22)	Geiselsöder, Hines-Allen (5)	Arike Ogunbowale (5)	American Airlines Center; 17,857	8–21
30	August 5	@ New York	L 76–85	Paige Bueckers (21)	Luisa Geiselsöder (10)	Berger, Bueckers, Geiselsöder, Ogunbowale (4)	Barclays Center; 17,306	8–22
31	August 8	New York	L 77–88	Arike Ogunbowale (17)	Grace Berger (8)	Grace Berger (4)	College Park Center; 6,251	8–23
32	August 10	Washington	L 78–91	Paige Bueckers (17)	Myisha Hines-Allen (11)	Myisha Hines-Allen (5)	College Park Center; 6,152	8–24
33	August 12	@ Indiana	W 81–80	Maddy Siegrist (22)	Myisha Hines-Allen (6)	Myisha Hines-Allen (9)	Gainbridge Fieldhouse; 16,027	9–24
34	August 15	Los Angeles	L 96–97	Paige Bueckers (29)	Myisha Hines-Allen (7)	JJ Quinerly (9)	College Park Center; 6,116	9–25
35	August 17	@ Las Vegas	L 87–106	Maddy Siegrist (23)	Aziaha James (8)	Berger, Bueckers, Hines-Allen, James, Quinerly (4)	Michelob Ultra Arena; 10,418	9–26
36	August 20	@ Los Angeles	L 80–81	Paige Bueckers (44)	Berger, Geiselsöder (6)	Grace Berger (7)	Crypto.com Arena; 13,598	9–27
37	August 22	Seattle	L 60–95	Maddy Siegrist (12)	Haley Jones (10)	Grace Berger (3)	College Park Center; 6,063	9–28
38	August 24	Golden State	L 81–90	Maddy Siegrist (16)	Myisha Hines-Allen (8)	Paige Bueckers (9)	College Park Center; 6,251	9–29
39	August 27	Connecticut	L 95–101	Aziaha James (22)	Berger, Hines-Allen (7)	Berger, James (6)	College Park Center; 5,710	9–30
40	August 29	@ Atlanta	L 78–100	Maddy Siegrist (23)	Hines-Allen, Okonkwo (6)	Paige Bueckers (10)	Gateway Center Arena; 3,268	9–31

September : 1–3 (Home: 1–0; Road: 0–3)

Game	Date	Team	Score	High points	High rebounds	High assists	Location Attendance	Record
41	September 1	@ Minnesota	L 71–96	Paige Bueckers (17)	Myisha Hines-Allen (8)	Grace Berger (4)	Target Center; 10,824	9–32
42	September 4	@ Golden State	L 80–84	Paige Bueckers (27)	Myisha Hines-Allen (11)	Haley Jones (7)	Chase Center; 18,064	9–33
43	September 7	@ Los Angeles	L 77–91	Paige Bueckers (18)	Myisha Hines-Allen (13)	Bueckers, Hines-Allen (7)	Crypto.com Arena; 13,868	9–34
44	September 11	Phoenix	W 97–76	Paige Bueckers (24)	Myisha Hines-Allen (10)	Paige Bueckers (7)	College Park Center; 6,251	10–34

2025 season schedule

Notes:

- Games highlighted in ██ represent Commissioner's Cup games.

== Standings ==
#	Team	W	L	PCT	GB	Conf.	Home	Road	Cup
1	yx – Minnesota Lynx	34	10	.773	–	20–4	20–2	14–8	5–1
2	x – Las Vegas Aces	30	14	.682	4	16–8	17–5	13–9	2–4
3	x – Atlanta Dream	30	14	.682	4	15–6	16–6	14–8	3–2
4	x – Phoenix Mercury	27	17	.614	7	13–11	15–7	12–10	4–2
5	x – New York Liberty	27	17	.614	7	15–5	17–5	10–12	4–1
6	cx – Indiana Fever	24	20	.545	10	13–8	13–9	11–11	4–1
7	x – Seattle Storm	23	21	.523	11	12–12	10–12	13–9	4–2
8	x – Golden State Valkyries	23	21	.523	11	9–15	14–8	9–13	3–3
9	e – Los Angeles Sparks	21	23	.477	13	10–14	9–13	12–10	2–4
10	e – Washington Mystics	16	28	.364	18	8–12	10–12	6–16	2–3
11	e – Connecticut Sun	11	33	.250	23	7–14	7–15	4–18	1–4
12	e – Chicago Sky	10	34	.227	24	4–17	6–16	4–18	1–4
13	e – Dallas Wings	10	34	.227	24	4–20	6–16	4–18	1–5

Notes

(#) – League Standing
c – Commissioner's Cup winners
y – Regular Season Champion
x – Clinched playoff berth
e – Eliminated from playoff contention
Source: Overall standings and Commissioner's Cup Standings

== Statistics ==
Legend
GP	Games played	GS	Games started	MPG	Minutes per game	RPG	Rebounds per game
APG	Assists per game	SPG	Steals per game	BPG	Blocks per game	PPG	Points per game
FG%	Field-goal percentage	3P%	3-point field-goal percentage	FT%	Free-throw percentage	TO	Turnovers per game
PF	Fouls per game		Team leader		League leader

=== Regular season ===
Player	GP	GS	MPG	FG%	3P%	FT%	RPG	APG	SPG	BPG	TO	PF	PPG
Paige Bueckers	36	36	33.3	47.7%	33.1%	88.8%	3.9	5.4	1.6	0.5	2.0	2.3	19.2
Arike Ogunbowale	29	29	33.3	36.4%	30.4%	93.1%	2.5	4.1	1.3	0.2	2.1	2.6	15.5
Maddy Siegrist	26	15	27.0	49.1%	32.1%	69.0%	4.3	0.8	0.7	0.6	0.5	1.9	12.7
DiJonai Carrington	20	13	24.9	35.4%	26.0%	82.5%	5.1	1.8	1.1	0.5	2.5	2.6	10.4
Haley Jones	24	16	22.8	46.0%	29.7%	62.9%	3.8	2.5	0.8	0.9	1.9	2.5	8.1
Luisa Geiselsöder	28	24	22.4	42.5%	33.0%	81.8%	4.8	1.6	0.8	0.7	1.0	2.4	6.9
Grace Berger	18	13	22.3	30.6%	9.5%	66.7%	3.4	3.2	0.8	0.4	1.0	2.0	3.6
Myisha Hines-Allen	40	20	22.1	44.8%	26.7%	74.7%	6.0	2.9	0.8	0.5	2.2	2.5	7.6
Li Yueru	22	12	20.0	42.1%	35.3%	84.2%	5.8	1.0	0.4	0.4	1.0	2.0	7.4
Amy Okonkwo	8	1	19.6	49.2%	33.3%	90.0%	3.1	0.8	1.4	0.1	0.9	1.4	11.0
NaLyssa Smith	18	15	19.1	42.5%	18.2%	61.7%	4.9	0.8	0.4	0.9	0.9	2.3	6.7
Aziaha James	38	8	17.7	37.3%	28.6%	74.5%	2.9	1.6	0.6	0.2	1.0	1.2	7.5
Tyasha Harris	5	0	16.4	44.4%	45.5%	100.0%	1.0	2.6	0.4	0.4	0.6	1.0	4.6
JJ Quinerly	34	13	15.9	42.6%	38.9%	86.7%	1.9	2.3	0.9	0.2	1.5	2.1	6.5
Kaila Charles	17	4	15.8	36.3%	33.3%	81.5%	4.0	1.1	0.5	0.2	0.9	1.9	5.3
Teaira McCowan	17	0	12.9	53.7%	50.0%	75.9%	4.6	0.6	0.3	0.7	0.9	1.4	5.6
Diamond Miller	15	1	12.7	33.8%	12.0%	53.8%	2.0	1.1	0.3	0.2	0.9	1.8	3.9
Christyn Williams	4	0	11.3	37.5%	25.0%	66.7%	1.0	0.8	—	—	0.3	1.0	4.3
Liatu King	2	0	8.0	33.3%	—	—	2.0	—	—	—	—	1.0	1.0
Serena Sundell	3	0	7.3	0.0%	0.0%	—	0.3	—	—	—	0.7	1.3	0.0
Ajae Petty	2	0	3.0	—	—	—	0.5	—	—	—	—	0.5	0.0

== Awards and honors ==
Recipient	Award	Date awarded	Ref.
Paige Bueckers	WNBA All-Star Starter	June 30	
Paige Bueckers	Rookie of the Month – June	July 3	
Paige Bueckers	Rookie of the Month – July	August 4	
Paige Bueckers	Rookie of the Month – August	September 3	
Paige Bueckers	AP Rookie of the Year	September 12	
Paige Bueckers	AP All-Rookie Team	September 12	
Paige Bueckers	AP All-WNBA Second Team	September 12	
Paige Bueckers	WNBA Rookie of the Year	September 16	
Paige Bueckers	WNBA All-Rookie Team	September 29	
Paige Bueckers	All-WNBA Second Team	October 10	
