= Ajae Petty =

American basketball player (born 2002)

Personal information
- Born: September 4, 2002 (age 23) Baltimore, Maryland, U.S.
- Listed height: 6 ft 2 in (1.88 m)
- Listed weight: 190 lb (86 kg)

Career information
- High school: New Town (Owings Mills, Maryland); Institute of Notre Dame (Baltimore, Maryland); Baltimore Polytechnic Institute (Baltimore, Maryland)
- College: LSU (2020–2022); Kentucky (2022–2024); Ohio State (2024–2025)
- WNBA draft: 2025: undrafted
- Playing career: 2025–present
- Position: Forward

Career history
- 2025–present: Dallas Wings
- 2025–2026: Dynamo Novosibirsk
- 2026: Taiyuan Textile
- Stats at WNBA.com
- Stats at Basketball Reference

Ajae Tamia Petty (born September 4, 2002) is an American professional basketball player who most recently played for the Dallas Wings. She played college basketball for the LSU Tigers, the Kentucky Wildcats, and the Ohio State Buckeyes.

== High school career ==
Petty played basketball for New Town High School as a freshman and sophomore, Institute of Notre Dame as a junior, and Baltimore Polytechnic Institute as a senior, where her team won their third straight Baltimore City title.

== College career ==
=== LSU ===
As a freshman at Louisiana State University, Petty averaged 5.1 minutes, 0.9 points and 0.9 rebounds across nineteen games. In her sophomore season, Petty averaged 5.6 minutes, 2.4 points and 2.4 rebounds across twelve games.

=== Kentucky ===
On May 2, 2022, it was announced that Petty would transfer to the University of Kentucky. As a junior, Petty averaged 5.7 points and 4.7 rebounds across 29 games, shooting 54.6% from the field. As a senior, Petty took on an expanded role in the team, starting all 32 games played during the season. She averaged 14.2 points, 10.6 rebounds, 1.3 steals, and 0.8 blocks, shooting 50.7% from the field. She was named Southeastern Conference player of the week after a career-high 33 points and 15 rebounds against Tennessee Tech in December 2023. In the 2023-24 season, she was Kentucky's leading scorer.

=== Ohio State ===
On April 15, 2024, Petty announced she was transferring to Ohio State for her graduate year and final season of NCAA eligibility. Across 33 games, she averaged 9.4 points, 7.2 rebounds, and 1.6 assists.

== Professional career ==
Petty went undrafted in the 2025 WNBA draft. On April 16, 2025, the Minnesota Lynx announced they had signed Petty to a training camp contract. On May 7, 2025, the Lynx announced they had waived Petty.

=== Dallas Wings (2025–present) ===
On September 2, 2025, the Dallas Wings announced they had signed Petty to a seven-day hardship contract. On September 7, Petty made her professional debut in a game against the Los Angeles Sparks, though she saw limited action. On September 9, the Wings signed Petty to a rest-of-season hardship contract.

== Career statistics ==
Legend
GP	Games played	GS	Games started	MPG	Minutes per game	RPG	Rebounds per game
APG	Assists per game	SPG	Steals per game	BPG	Blocks per game	PPG	Points per game
TO	Turnovers per game	FG%	Field-goal percentage	3P%	3-point field-goal percentage	FT%	Free-throw percentage
**Bold**	Career best	°	League leader

=== WNBA ===
==== Regular season ====
WNBA regular season statistics
Year	Team	GP	GS	MPG	FG%	3P%	FT%	RPG	APG	SPG	BPG	TO	PPG
2025	Dallas	2	0	3.0	–	–	–	0.5	0	0	0	0	0

=== College ===
NCAA statistics
Year	Team	GP	GS	MPG	FG%	3P%	FT%	RPG	APG	SPG	BPG	TO	PPG
2020-21	LSU	19	0	5.1	47.1	–	33.3	0.9	0.1	0	0.1	0.4	0.9
2021-22	LSU	12	0	5.6	56.3	–	52.4	2.4	0.1	0.2	0.3	0.3	2.4
2022-23	Kentucky	29	0	15.1	54.6	–	44.4	4.7	0.6	0.7	0.7	1.9	5.7
2023-24	Kentucky	32	32	**31.1**	50.7	–	49.5	**10.6**	1.0	**1.3**	**0.8**	**3.0**	**14.2**
2024-25	Ohio State	**33**	**33**	21.8	**58.8**	–	**56.3**	7.2	**1.6**	0.9	0.4	2.0	9.4
Career		125	65	18.5	53.9	–	50.0	6.1	0.8	0.8	0.5	1.8	7.8
