= Camryn Taylor =

American basketball player (born 2001)

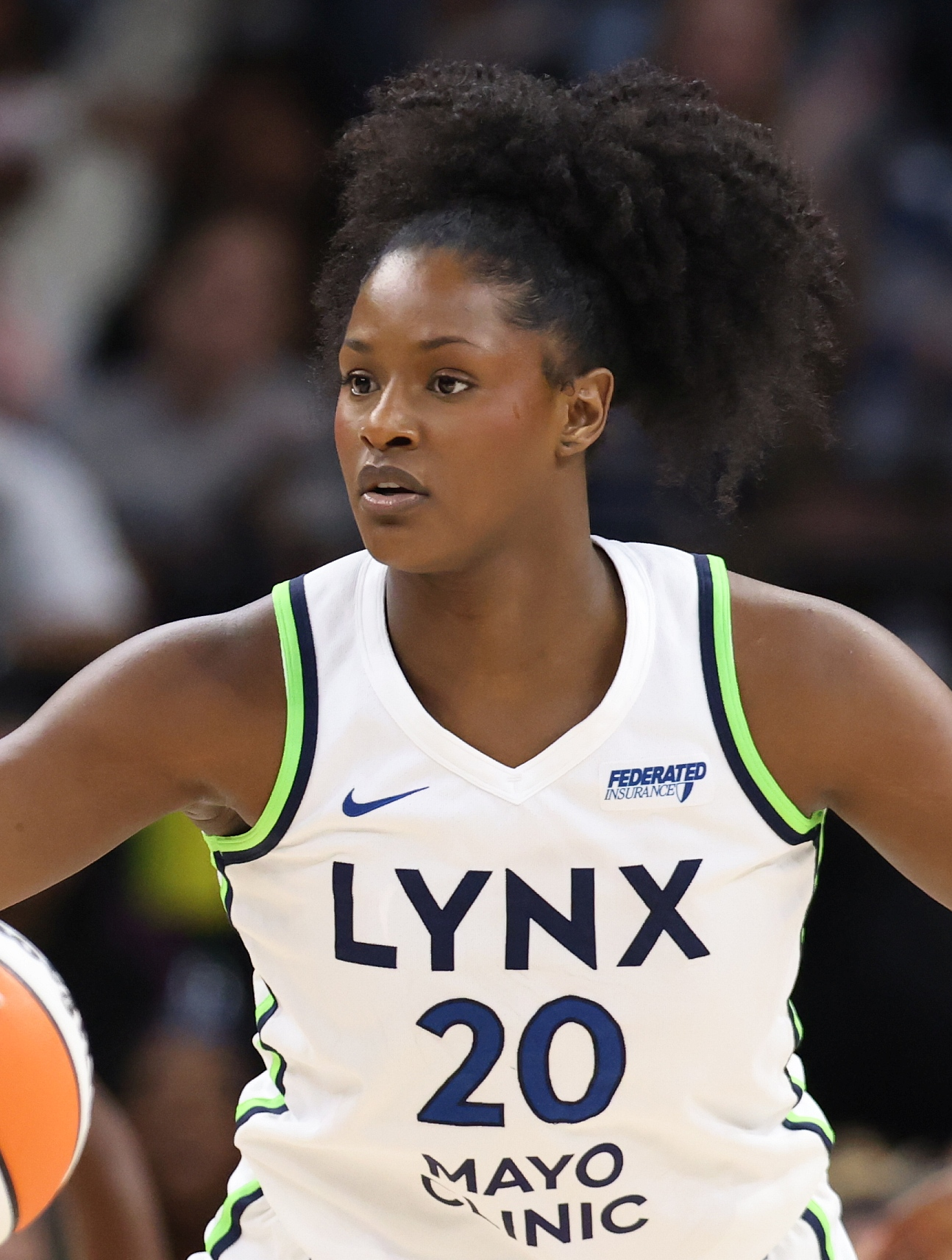
- Taylor in 2025

Personal information
- Born: March 15, 2001 (age 25) (Note: Some sources list a birth year of 2000.) Peoria, Illinois, U.S.
- Listed height: 6 ft 1 in (1.85 m)
- Listed weight: 190 lb (86 kg)

Career information
- High school: Richwoods (Peoria)
- College: Marquette (2019–2021); Virginia (2021–2024)
- Position: Forward

Career history
- 2024–2025: Esperides Kallitheas
- 2025: Minnesota Lynx

Career highlights
- Second-team All-ACC (2023); Big East All-Freshman Team (2020)
- Stats at WNBA.com
- Stats at Basketball Reference

Camryn Nichole Taylor (born March 15, 2001) is an American professional basketball player who most recently played for the Minnesota Lynx of the Women's National Basketball Association (WNBA). She played college basketball for the Marquette Golden Eagles and Virginia Cavaliers.

== Early life ==
Taylor was born March 15, 2001 in Peoria, Illinois. She lived in Atlanta, Georgia for part of her childhood, but returned to Peoria, where she attended Richwoods High School. In her junior year of high school, she led the school's basketball team to the 2018 state championship and surpassed 1,000 career points that season. The Peoria Journal Star named Taylor the region's large-school girls' basketball player of the year for 2018. She was named first-team all-state in both her junior and senior seasons by the Illinois Basketball Coaches Association and the Associated Press.

== College career ==
Taylor began her college basketball career with the Marquette Golden Eagles in 2019. She played in 31 games in her first year; she averaged 9.3 points per game, the fourth-highest on her team. She earned her first career double-double with a 23-point, 11-rebound performance in a win against the Seton Hall Pirates. Taylor was named to the Big East All-Freshman team that season.

Taylor started in all 26 games of her sophomore season at Marquette, averaging 12.0 points, 6.9 rebounds, and 1.7 assists per game. She earned four double-doubles in the season, including against the UConn Huskies in the championship game of the 2020 Big East women's basketball tournament, in which she tallied 11 points and 13 rebounds. In the first round of the 2020 NCAA Division I women's basketball tournament against the Virginia Tech Hokies, she recorded 15 points, two rebounds, and one assist. She was an honorable mention to the All-Big East team for the 2020–2021 season.

After her sophomore season, Taylor transferred to play basketball for the Virginia Cavaliers. In her first game at Virginia, she tallied 27 points and seven rebounds against the James Madison Dukes. She played and started in 12 games, leading the team in points per game (12.8). She recorded the team's first double-double of the season with 14 points and 12 rebounds against the William & Mary Tribe before taking a leave of absence for the remainder of the season following the death of her mother from cancer.

Rejoining Virginia for her senior season, Taylor averaged 13.9 points and 6.2 rebounds per game, both leading her team. She started in all 30 games, scoring double-digit points in 21 of them, including a 22-point performance in a win against the Minnesota Golden Gophers. She added two double-doubles, reached 1,000 career points, and was named second-team All-ACC in the 2022–2023 season.

Taylor returned to Virginia for a fifth season in 2023–2024. She started in 26 of 28 games, averaging 14.8 points and 6.1 rebounds per game, the latter of which led her team. She recorded four double-doubles on the season, bringing her career total to 12, and was invited to participate in the Women's College All-Star Game.

== Professional career ==
=== Minnesota Lynx ===
On April 23, 2024, Taylor signed a training camp contract with the Minnesota Lynx of the Women's National Basketball Association (WNBA). She was released on May 11. She rejoined the Lynx training camp on February 25, 2025, and was released on May 7.

On August 8, 2025, Taylor signed a seven-day contract with the Lynx. When the contract expired on August 15, the team signed her to a second seven-day contract, followed by a third consecutive seven-day contract on August 22. After the contract expired on August 29, the Lynx signed Taylor to a rest-of-season contract on September 1, 2025.

=== Overseas ===
Taylor played for Esperides Kallitheas in Greece during the 2024–2025 season. She averaged 19.6 points and 6.7 rebounds per game in 25 games.

== Career statistics ==
Legend
GP	Games played	GS	Games started	MPG	Minutes per game	FG%	Field goal percentage
3P%	3-point field goal percentage	FT%	Free throw percentage	RPG	Rebounds per game	APG	Assists per game
SPG	Steals per game	BPG	Blocks per game	TO	Turnovers per game	PPG	Points per game
**Bold**	Career high	*	Led Division I	°	Led the league	‡	WNBA record

=== WNBA ===
WNBA regular season statistics
Year	Team	GP	GS	MPG	FG%	3P%	FT%	RPG	APG	SPG	BPG	TO	PPG
2025	Minnesota	6	0	3.8	.143	.333	.000	1.0	0.2	0.0	0.0	0.5	0.5
**Career**	1 year, 1 team	6	0	3.8	.143	.333	.000	1.0	0.2	0.0	0.0	0.5	0.5

WNBA playoffs statistics
Year	Team	GP	GS	MPG	FG%	3P%	FT%	RPG	APG	SPG	BPG	TO	PPG
2025	Minnesota	2	0	2.0	.000	–	–	0.5	0.0	0.0	0.0	0.0	0.0
**Career**	1 year, 1 team	2	0	2.0	.000	–	–	0.5	0.0	0.0	0.0	0.0	0.0

=== College ===
NCAA statistics
Year	Team	GP	GS	MPG	FG%	3P%	FT%	RPG	APG	SPG	BPG	TO	PPG
2019–20	Marquette	**31**	0	16.3	**.533**	–	.628	3.8	0.7	0.4	0.5	**1.3**	9.3
2020–21	Marquette	26	26	24.6	.516	.000	.671	**6.9**	**1.7**	0.6	0.4	2.0	12.0
2021–22	Virginia	12	12	**27.1**	.403	.182	.744	6.1	1.2	**1.3**	0.4	2.8	12.8
2022–23	Virginia	30	**30**	24.9	.459	.167	.745	6.2	0.7	1.1	**0.8**	2.4	13.9
2023–24	Virginia	28	26	24.9	.465	**.517**	**.835**	6.1	0.6	0.8	**0.8**	1.7	**14.8**
**Career**		127	94	23.0	.477	.328	.730	5.7	0.9	0.8	0.6	1.9	12.5

== Personal life ==
As a child, Taylor learned to play the violin, viola, cello, string bass, and guitar.

Taylor majored in business administration at Marquette University. At the University of Virginia, she was a graduate student in the school of education.
