= Aziaha James =

American basketball player

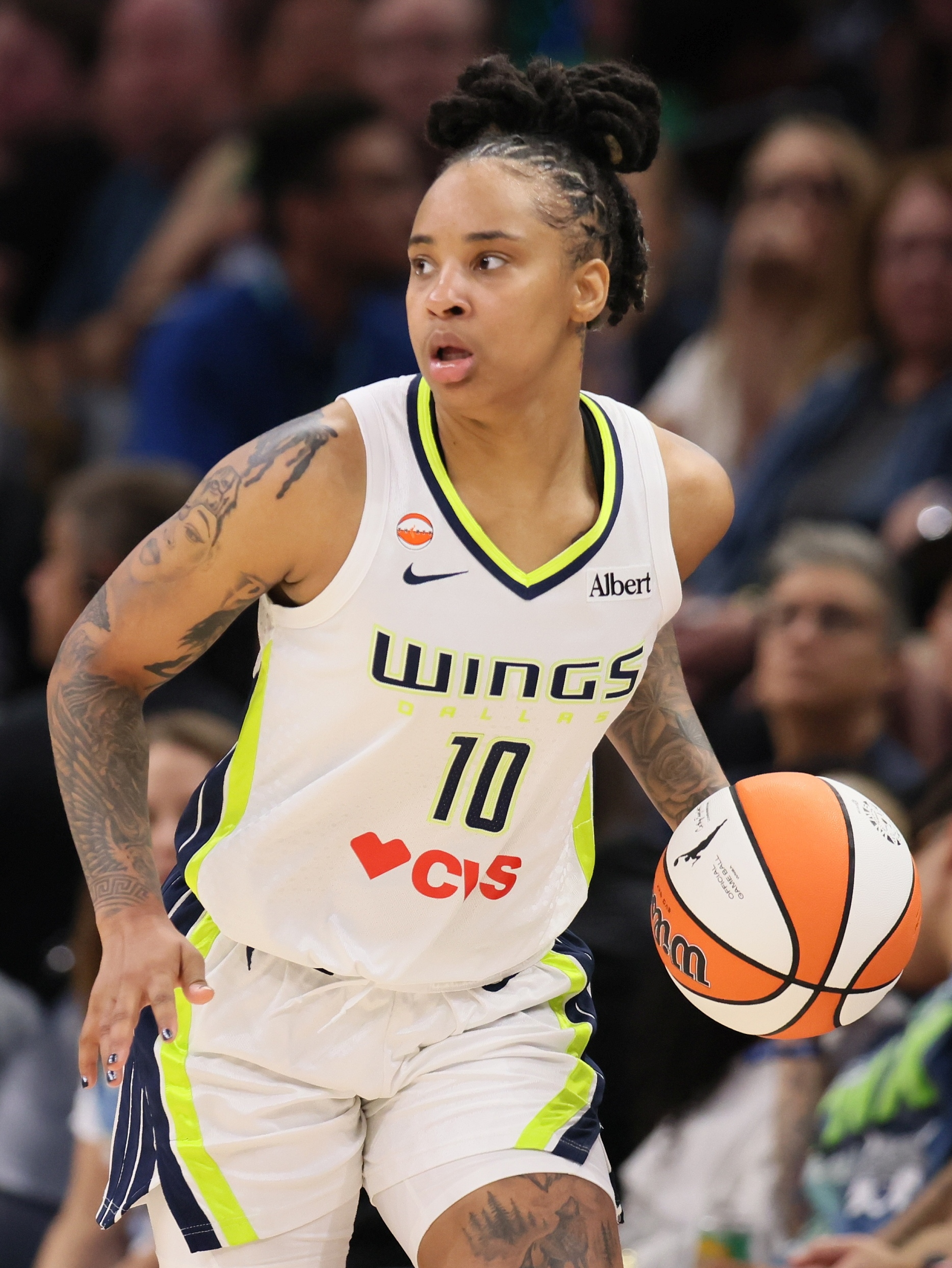
- James with the Dallas Wings in 2026

No. 10 – Dallas Wings
- Position: Guard
- League: WNBA

Personal information
- Born: November 19, 2002 (age 23) Virginia Beach, Virginia, U.S.
- Listed height: 5 ft 10 in (1.78 m)

Career information
- High school: Princess Anne (Virginia Beach, Virginia)
- College: NC State (2021–2025)
- WNBA draft: 2025: 1st round, 12th overall pick
- Drafted by: Dallas Wings
- Playing career: 2025–present

Career history
- 2025–present: Dallas Wings

Career highlights
- 2x First-team All-ACC (2024, 2025); ACC All-Freshman Team (2022)
- Stats at Basketball Reference
Medals
Women's 3x3 basketball
Representing the United States
FIBA 3x3 AmeriCup
Silver medal – second place	2026 San Salvador

Aziaha James (/əˈzaɪʌ/ ə-ZY-uh; born November 19, 2002) is an American professional basketball player for the Dallas Wings of the Women's National Basketball Association (WNBA) and for Rose of Unrivaled. She played college basketball at NC State. She was selected 12th overall by the Wings in the 2025 WNBA draft.

== High school career ==
James played basketball for Princess Anne High School in Virginia Beach, Virginia. As a junior, she repeated as the Daily Press All-Tidewater Player of the Year and was named Virginia High School League Class 5 Player of the Year. Four days after the death of her brother, James scored a career-high 41 points in a quarterfinal win at the Class 5 state tournament. She helped her team win the state title in each of her four seasons and its eighth straight as a senior. Rated a four-star recruit by ESPN, she committed to play college basketball for NC State.

== College career ==
As a freshman at NC State, James averaged 4.2 points per game and was named to the Atlantic Coast Conference (ACC) All-Freshman Team. In her sophomore season, she averaged 6.8 points and 2.3 assists per game, primarily coming off the bench. As a junior, James entered a leading role and was named first-team All-ACC. She helped NC State reach the Final Four of the 2024 NCAA tournament, its first appearance since 1998, and earned most outstanding player honors for the Portland 4 Regional. In her last season, James averaged 17.9 points and 4.9 rebounds per game, playing a key role in leading the Wolfpack to its 10th Sweet 16 appearance.

== Professional career ==
=== WNBA ===
==== Dallas Wings (2025–present) ====
On April 14, 2025, James was selected 12th overall by the Dallas Wings in the 2025 WNBA draft. Despite falling to No. 12 in the draft, James quickly established herself as a key contributor to the Wings, making impact on both ends of the floor. On June 20, 2025, James scored a career-high 17 points on a 86–83 win against the Connecticut Sun. At that point, she and teammate Paige Bueckers were the only rookies that season to record a 15-point, 5-rebound, 5-assist game. She surpassed that mark on July 3, when she set a new career-high with 28 points, knocking down five three-pointers while adding six rebounds and six assists. With that performance, James joined Caitlin Clark, Sabrina Ionescu, Breanna Stewart, and Diana Taurasi as the only rookies in WNBA history to record a game with at least 25 points, 5 assists, 5 rebounds, and 5 made threes. James finished her rookie campaign averaging 7.5 points, 2.9 rebounds and 1.6 assists per game while appearing in 38 of the team's 44 games.

== Personal life ==
James' older brother, Ashley "AJ" James, committed to play college basketball for Missouri State but died in an accidental shooting in 2020, before entering college.

In April 2024, James attended Kelsey Plum's second annual Dawg Class, a 3-day camp with the purpose of helping top women college athletes transition from collegiate to professional basketball. The 2024 camp was held at the IMG Academy and sponsored by Under Armour.

== Career statistics ==
Legend
GP	Games played	GS	Games started	MPG	Minutes per game	RPG	Rebounds per game
APG	Assists per game	SPG	Steals per game	BPG	Blocks per game	PPG	Points per game
TO	Turnovers per game	FG%	Field-goal percentage	3P%	3-point field-goal percentage	FT%	Free-throw percentage
**Bold**	Career best	°	League leader

=== WNBA ===
==== Regular season ====
WNBA regular season statistics
Year	Team	GP	GS	MPG	FG%	3P%	FT%	RPG	APG	SPG	BPG	TO	PPG
2025	Dallas	38	**8**	**17.7**	.373	**.286**	**.745**	**2.9**	**1.6**	.6	**.2**	1.0	**7.5**
2026	Dallas	**39**	2	11.8	**.388**	.246	.739	2.4	1.3	**.9**	**.2**	**.8**	6.1
**Career**	2 years, 1 team	77	10	14.7	.380	.272	.742	2.6	1.4	.8	.2	.9	6.8

==== Playoffs ====
WNBA playoff statistics
Year	Team	GP	GS	MPG	FG%	3P%	FT%	RPG	APG	SPG	BPG	TO	PPG
2026	Dallas	3	0	13.0	.438	.250	.750	.7	.7	.7	.3	.3	7.3
**Career**	1 year, 1 team	3	0	13.0	.438	.250	.750	.7	.7	.7	.3	.3	7.3

=== College ===
Year	Team	GP	GS	MPG	FG%	3P%	FT%	RPG	APG	SPG	BPG	TO	PPG
2021–22	NC State	25	0	9.5	.426	.293	.381	1.6	.6	.6	.1	**.5**	4.2
2022–23	NC State	32	6	18.8	.407	.288	.636	2.9	2.3	**1.2**	**.3**	1.3	6.8
2023–24	NC State	**38**	**38**	**31.8**	.416	**.342**	**.781**	4.6	**2.9**	1.0	.2	2.2	16.8
2024–25	NC State	35	34	31.1	**.445**	.333	.750	**4.9**	2.6	1.1	.3	2.0	**17.9**
**Career**		130	78	24.1	.426	.328	.720	3.7	2.2	1.0	.2	1.6	12.2
Statistics retrieved from Sports-Reference.
