= Chris Koclanes =

American basketball coach

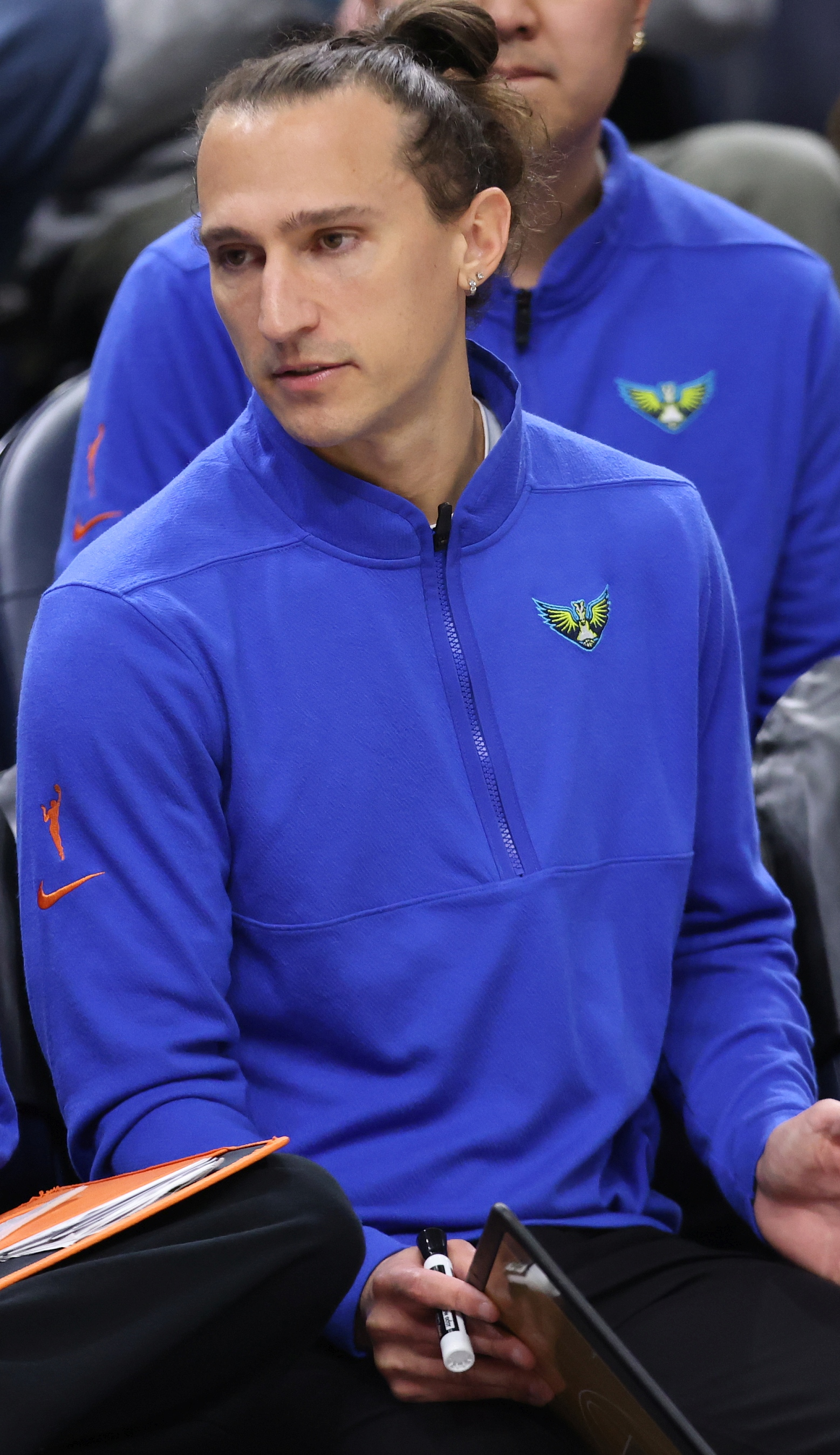
- Koclanes with the Dallas Wings in 2025

Personal information
- Born: Pelham, New York, U.S

Career information
- College: Old Dominion

Career history

Coaching
- 2019–2022: Connecticut Sun (defensive coordinator)
- 2023: Los Angeles Sparks (defensive coordinator)
- 2023–2024: USC (assistant coach)
- 2025: Dallas Wings

Chris Koclanes is an American professional basketball coach who was most recently the head coach of the Dallas Wings of the Women's National Basketball Association (WNBA). He previously served as an assistant coach with the Connecticut Sun, Los Angeles Sparks, and USC Trojans.

== Coaching career ==
Koclanes began his basketball career as director of operations for the William & Mary Tribe women’s basketball team. From 2013 to 2015 he worked as video coordinator for the Saint Joseph's Hawks. In 2015, Koclanes was hired as video coordinator for the USC Trojans, a position he held until the 2018–2019 season.

In 2016, Koclanes joined the Connecticut Sun of the Women's National Basketball Association (WNBA), working as video coordinator under head coach Curt Miller. In 2019, he was promoted to assistant coach, serving as defensive coordinator.

In 2023, Koclanes followed Miller to the Los Angeles Sparks, once again working as defensive coordinator.

In September 2023, Koclanes returned to USC as an assistant coach under head coach Lindsay Gottlieb.

On December 23, 2024, Koclanes was named the head coach of the Dallas Wings, once again reuniting with Miller, who had been named the general manager of the Wings in November. He was relieved of his duties on September 30, 2025.

== Head coaching record ==
=== WNBA ===
Legend
Regular season	G	Games coached	W	Games won	L	Games lost	W–L %	Win–loss %
Playoffs	PG	Playoff games	PW	Playoff wins	PL	Playoff losses	PW–L %	Playoff win–loss %

Team	Year	G	W	L	W–L%	Finish	PG	PW	PL	PW–L%	Result
DAL	2025	44	10	34	.227	7th in West	–	–	–	–	Missed Playoffs
Career		44	10	34	.227		–	–	–	–	
