= McKenzie Forbes =

American basketball player (born 2000)

Free agent
- Position: Shooting guard / small forward

Personal information
- Born: June 23, 2000 (age 26) Los Angeles, California, U.S.
- Listed height: 6 ft 0 in (1.83 m)
- Listed weight: 174 lb (79 kg)

Career information
- High school: Folsom (Folsom, California)
- College: California (2018–2019); Harvard (2021–2023); USC (2023–2024)
- WNBA draft: 2024: 3rd round, 28th overall pick
- Drafted by: Los Angeles Sparks
- Playing career: 2024–present

Career history
- 2024: Waverley Falcons
- 2024: Mainland Pouākai

Career highlights
- NBL1 South champion (2024); All Pac-12 (2024); Pac-12 Tournament MVP (2024); McDonald's All-American (2018)
- Stats at Basketball Reference

McKenzie Forbes (born June 23, 2000) is an American professional basketball player who is currently a free agent. She was drafted by the Los Angeles Sparks in the 2024 WNBA draft. She played college basketball at California, Harvard, and USC.

== High school ==
Forbes attended Folsom High School in Folsom, California.

== College career ==
Forbes began her college basketball career for the California Golden Bears.

Following her freshman year, she transferred to Harvard, where she planned to play for the Crimson. However, the school cancelled the season due to the COVID-19 pandemic. During her junior year at Harvard, she averaged 14.1 points, 3.8 rebounds, 2.5 assists and 1.1 steals per game.

After graduating from Harvard and being ineligible to play for the Crimson anymore, Forbes transferred to USC for the 2023–24 season.

== Professional career ==
Forbes was drafted in the third round, 28th overall, by the Los Angeles Sparks in the 2024 WNBA draft. On May 12, 2024, Forbes was waived by the Sparks.

Forbes joined the Waverley Falcons of the NBL1 South for the 2024 NBL1 season and helped them win the NBL1 South championship. In 16 games, she averaged 16.0 points, 3.8 rebounds, 3.1 assists and 1.3 steals in 27.8 minutes per game.

After her time in Australia, she went to New Zealand and joined the Mainland Pouākai of the Tauihi Basketball Aotearoa. On November 24, 2024, in a 97–89 win over the Tokomanawa Queens, she scored a league-record 39 points. Overall in 13 games, she averaged 18.5 points, 5.4 rebounds, 4.2 assists and 1.1 steals in 34.1 minutes per game.

She played in the 2025 season of the Athletes Unlimited Pro Basketball.

On February 28, 2025, Forbes signed a training camp contract with the Dallas Wings. On May 3, she was waived by the Wings.

== Career statistics ==
Legend
GP	Games played	GS	Games started	MPG	Minutes per game	RPG	Rebounds per game
APG	Assists per game	SPG	Steals per game	BPG	Blocks per game	PPG	Points per game
TO	Turnovers per game	FG%	Field-goal percentage	3P%	3-point field-goal percentage	FT%	Free-throw percentage
**Bold**	Career best	°	League leader

=== College ===
Year	Team	GP	GS	MPG	FG%	3P%	FT%	RPG	APG	SPG	BPG	TO	PPG
2018–19	California	33	0	16.9	36.9	36.6	65.7	1.5	1.4	0.2	0.4	**1.1**	5.3
2019–20	Harvard	Sat out due to NCAA transfer rules											
2020–21	Harvard	Season cancelled due to COVID-19 pandemic											
2021–22	Harvard	24	23	27.4	37.4	34.9	76.8	3.8	2.5	1.1	**0.6**	1.8	14.1
2022–23	Harvard	32	31	30.6	**41.5**	**40.1**	74.4	**3.9**	2.3	0.8	0.3	2.5	13.7
2023–24	USC	**35**	**35**	**34.0**	38.4	37.4	**78.1**	3.1	**3.3**	0.8	0.2	2.2	**14.3**
**Career**		124	89	27.3	38.9	37.4	75.2	3.0	2.4	0.7	0.3	1.9	11.7
Statistics retrieved from Sports-Reference.
