= JJ Quinerly =

American basketball player (born 2002)

- JJ Quinerly in 2026

No. 3 – Savannah Steel
- Position: Guard
- League: UpShot League

Personal information
- Born: October 24, 2002 (age 24) Norfolk, Virginia, U.S.
- Listed height: 5 ft 8 in (1.73 m)

Career information
- High school: Lake Taylor (Norfolk, Virginia)
- College: West Virginia (2021–2025)
- WNBA draft: 2025: 3rd round, 27th overall pick
- Drafted by: Dallas Wings

Career history
- 2025–2026: Dallas Wings

Career highlights
- 2× Big 12 Defensive Player of the Year (2024, 2025); 3× First-team All-Big 12 (2023–2025); 3× Big 12 All-Defensive Team (2023–2025); Big 12 All-Tournament Team (2025); Big 12 All-Freshman Team (2022)
- Stats at Basketball Reference

Ja'Naiya "JJ" Quinerly (born October 24, 2002) is an American professional basketball player who plays for the Savannah Steel of the UpShot League. She played college basketball at West Virginia.

== High school career ==
Quinerly attended Lake Taylor High School in Norfolk, Virginia. During her sophomore year, she averaged a double-double with 20.3 points and ten assists per game, and led the Titans to the VHSL 4A state championship. She was named the 2019 VHSCA 4A Player of the Year, and named to the Virginia All-State second team. She committed to play college basketball at West Virginia.

== College career ==
During the 2021–22 season, in her freshman year, she appeared in 30 games, with 12 starts, and averaged 8.8 points, 2.5 rebounds, 2.7 assists and 2.3 steals per game. Her 68 steals led the team, and were the most by a freshman in a season since Maria Tchobanova had 74 during the 1995–96 season. Following the season she was named to the Big 12 all-freshman team.

During the 2022–23 season, in her sophomore year, she averaged 14.5 points, 4.2 rebounds, 2.2 assists and 2.1 steals per game. She led the team with 66 steals. On December 31, 2022, she scored a then career-high 28 points in a game against Oklahoma. On January 21, 2023, in a game against Texas Tech, she scored 16 points and ten rebounds for her first career double-double. Following the season she was named to the Big 12 All-Defensive team and a first-team all-Big 12 honoree.

During the 2023–24 season, in her junior year, she averaged 19.8 points, 3.2 rebounds, 2.7 assists and 2.9 steals per game. She the team with 97 steals, the fifth most in a single-season in program history. On February 24, 2024, in a game against Baylor, she scored a then career-high 33 points. Following the season she was named to the Big 12 All-Defensive team and a first-team all-Big 12 honoree for the second consecutive year. She was named the Big 12 Defensive Player of the Year and a WBCA All-American honorable mention. She was also named a Naismith Defensive Player of the Year Award semifinalist and Ann Meyers Drysdale Award finalist.

During the 2024–25 season, in her senior year, she averaged 20.4 points, 3.1 rebounds, 3.2 assists and 3.0 steals per game. She ranked second in the league with 3.11 steals per game while leading West Virginia to the best scoring defense in the Big 12. On February 26, 2025, in a game against Utah, she scored a career-high 38 points, and tied the program's single-game scoring record. Following the season she was named to the Big 12 All-Defensive team and a first-team all-Big 12 honoree for the third consecutive year. She became the second player in program history to be named a first-team selection three times in their career, following Bria Holmes. She is also the first Mountaineer to be featured on the conference's defensive team three times in their career. She was named the Big 12 Defensive Player of the Year and a WBCA All-American honorable mention for the second consecutive year. She was again named a Naismith Defensive Player of the Year Award semifinalist and Ann Meyers Drysdale Award finalist for the second consecutive year.

She finished her career with 2,016 points, 410 rebounds, 341 assists, and 328 steals. She became the fourth Mountaineer to surpass 2,000 career points, and ranks third on West Virginia's all-time list in points and steals.

== Professional career ==
=== WNBA ===
==== Dallas Wings (2025–2026) ====
On April 14, 2025, Quinerly was selected by the Dallas Wings in the third round, 27th overall, of the 2025 WNBA draft. On July 7, she led the Wings with a career-high 18 points, including a career-best four made three-pointers, in a 102–72 loss to the Phoenix Mercury. On August 20, Quinerly suffered an ACL sprain in her left knee during an 81–80 loss to the Los Angeles Sparks, which sidelined her for the remainder of the season. Despite the setback, Quinerly turned in a solid rookie campaign, averaging 6.5 points, 2.3 assists, and 1.9 rebounds per game across 34 appearances. She was recognized as one of the team's few above-average perimeter defenders, with her balanced scoring and defensive abilities making her a valuable contributor to a roster seeking consistency. Quinerly became just the third third-round pick over the last decade to average at least six points per game in her rookie season, and only the seventh third-round pick selection in league history to average at least six points and two assists per game as a rookie. On October 3, the Wings announced that Quinerly had undergone successful knee surgery, osteochondral allograft procedure and a meniscus repair in her left knee.

=== Savannah Steel ===
On August 5, 2026, Quinerly signed with the Savannah Steel of the UpShot League.

=== Overseas ===
On June 26, 2025, Quinerly signed with PAOK for the 2025-26 season.

== Personal life ==
Quinerly was born to John and Nikosha Quinerly, and has one brother.

== Career statistics ==
Legend
GP	Games played	GS	Games started	MPG	Minutes per game	RPG	Rebounds per game
APG	Assists per game	SPG	Steals per game	BPG	Blocks per game	PPG	Points per game
TO	Turnovers per game	FG%	Field-goal percentage	3P%	3-point field-goal percentage	FT%	Free-throw percentage
**Bold**	Career best	°	League leader

=== WNBA ===
==== Regular season ====
Stats current through end of 2025 season

WNBA regular season statistics
Year	Team	GP	GS	MPG	FG%	3P%	FT%	RPG	APG	SPG	BPG	TO	PPG
2025	Dallas	34	13	15.9	.426	.389	.867	1.9	2.3	0.9	0.2	1.5	6.5
**Career**	1 year, 1 team	34	13	15.9	.426	.389	.867	1.9	2.3	0.9	0.2	1.5	6.5

=== College ===
Year	Team	GP	GS	MPG	FG%	3P%	FT%	RPG	APG	SPG	BPG	TO	PPG
2021–22	West Virginia	30	12	24.2	42.4	33.3	69.5	2.5	2.7	2.3	**0.5**	**1.9**	8.8
2022–23	West Virginia	31	31	28.0	41.6	29.7	70.2	**4.2**	2.2	2.1	0.3	2.4	14.5
2023–24	West Virginia	**33**	**33**	31.0	**46.2**	**34.4**	78.5	3.2	2.7	2.9	0.1	3.3	19.8
2024–25	West Virginia	32	32	**31.4**	44.3	31.4	**82.9**	3.1	**3.2**	**3.0**	0.3	3.2	**20.4**
**Career**		126	108	28.7	43.9	32.2	77.1	3.3	2.7	2.6	0.3	2.7	16.0
Statistics retrieved from Sports-Reference.
