= 2020 McDonald's All-American Girls Game =

Cancelled basketball event

West	East
- Date: April 1, 2020 (cancelled)
- Venue: Toyota Center, Houston, Texas
- Network: ESPN2

McDonald's All-American

The 2020 McDonald's All-American Girls Game was an all-star basketball game that was scheduled to be held in 2020. The game's rosters featured the best and most highly recruited high school girls graduating in the class of 2020. The game would have been the 19th annual version of the McDonald's All-American Game first played in 2002. Due to the impact of the COVID-19 pandemic, the game was cancelled and the players were honored virtually. The 24 players were selected from over 700 nominees by a committee of basketball experts. They were chosen not only for their on-court skills, but for their performances off the court as well.

== Rosters ==
The roster was announced on January 23, 2020. Oregon had the most selections with five, while Louisville, Syracuse, UConn had two selections each.

ESPNW 100 Rank	Name	Height	Position	Hometown	High school	College choice
2	Cameron Brink	6–4	F	Beaverton, Oregon	Mountainside High School	Stanford
1	Paige Bueckers	5–11	PG	Hopkins, Minnesota	Hopkins High School	UConn
5	Kamilla Cardoso	6–6	P	Montes Claros, Brazil	Hamilton Heights Christian Academy	Syracuse
4	Caitlin Clark	5–11	PG	West Des Moines, Iowa	Dowling Catholic High School	Iowa
18	Olivia Cochran	6–1	F	Columbus, Georgia	Carver High School	Louisville
13	Dalaylah Daniels	6–4	F	Seattle, Washington	Garfield High School	California
14	Lexi Donarski	5–10	PG	La Crosse, Wisconsin	Aquinas High School	Iowa State
22	Angela Dugalić	6–4	F	Des Plaines, Illinois	Maine West High School	Oregon
21	Sasha Goforth	6–0	G	Fayetteville, Arkansas	Fayetteville High School	Oregon State
16	Hannah Gusters	6–4	P	Dallas, Texas	MacArthur High School	Baylor
28	Madison Hayes	5–10	G	Chattanooga, Tennessee	East Hamilton High School	Mississippi State
29	Treasure Hunt	6–2	W	Chattanooga, Tennessee	Hamilton Heights Christian Academy	Kentucky
10	Deja Kelly	5–8	PG	San Antonio, Texas	Duncanville High School	North Carolina
25	Mir McLean	5–11	W	Baltimore, Maryland	Roland Park Country School	UConn
11	Te-Hina Paopao	5–9	PG	Oceanside, California	La Jolla Country Day School	Oregon
8	Sydney Parrish	6–0	G	Fishers, Indiana	Hamilton Southeastern High School	Oregon
3	Angel Reese	6–3	W	Baltimore, Maryland	St. Frances Academy	Maryland
43	Eniya Russell	5–10	PG	Baltimore, Maryland	St. Vincent Pallotti High School	South Carolina
19	Maddie Scherr	5–11	G	Florence, Kentucky	Ryle High School	Oregon
15	Madison Scott	6–1	W	Indian Head, Maryland	Bishop McNamara High School	Ole Miss
7	Hailey Van Lith	5–7	G	Wenatchee, Washington	Cashmere High School	Louisville
17	Kylee Watson	6–3	F	Linwood, New Jersey	Mainland Regional High School	Oregon
20	Madeline Westbeld	6–2	F	Kettering, Ohio	Fairmont High School	Notre Dame
9	Priscilla Williams	6–2	G	Houston, Texas	Branson High School	Syracuse
