= Neutron Man =

American football fan (1942–2004)

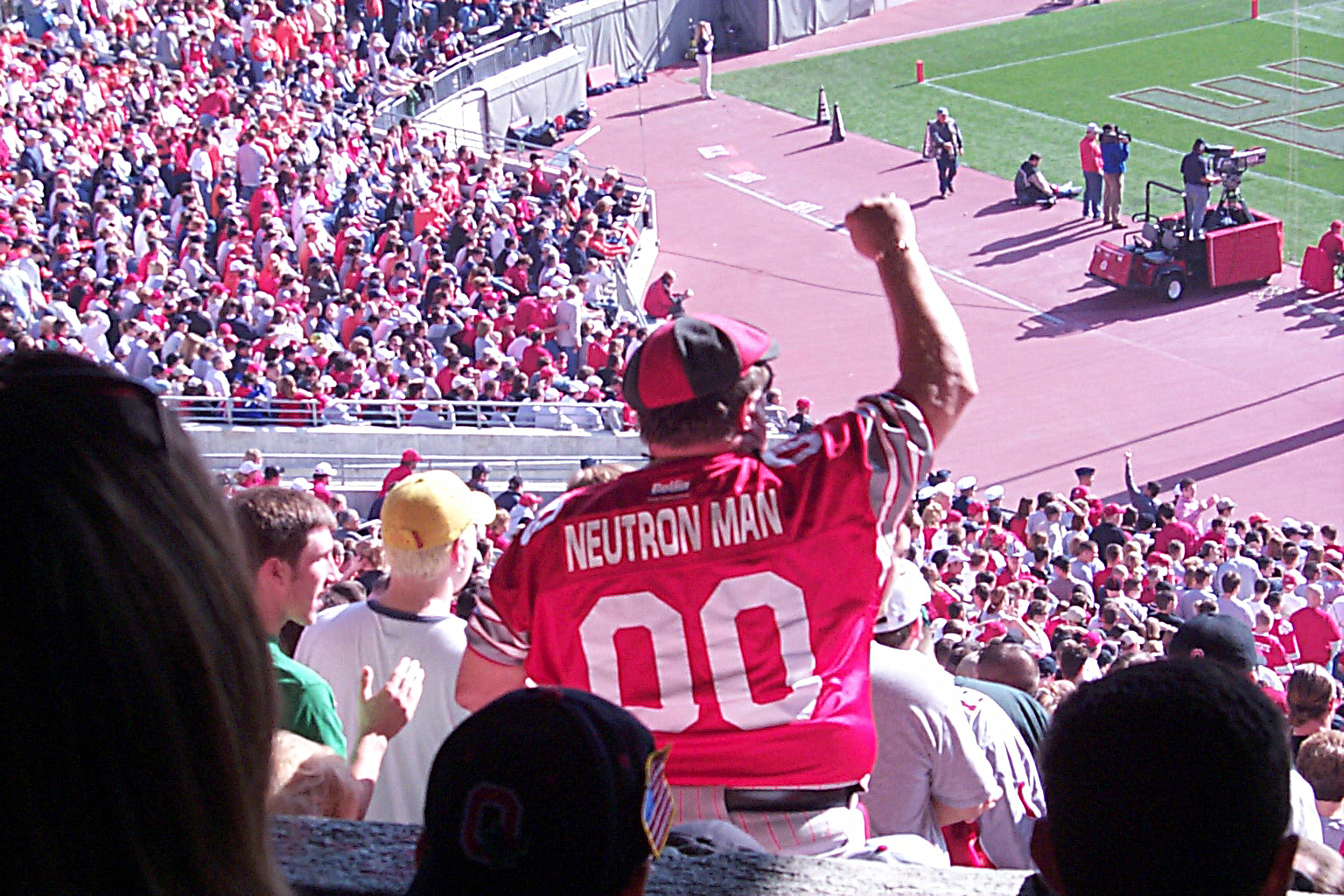
"Neutron Man" dancing at Ohio Stadium, November 17, 2001.

The Neutron Man (March 30, 1942 – October 7, 2004), real name Orlas King, was a popular Ohio State Buckeyes fan for over thirty years. Always seated by the marching band, King would burst into his original dances whenever the Ohio State University Marching Band would play the “Neutron Dance”.

== Early life ==
King grew up in Kettering, Ohio where his father was a tool and die maker. Every year he and his father would travel to Columbus, Ohio, to Ohio Stadium to watch a Buckeyes home football game. King attended Kettering Fairmont High School and played football. Later, King went on to play football on a scholarship at the University of Dayton.

== Football games ==
King started dancing at Ohio State home football games in 1972. At that time he was known as the B Deck Dancer. He remained the B Deck Dancer until the mid-1980s when the Ohio State Marching Band introduced its rendition of the Pointer Sisters’ “Neutron Dance”. The spectators established a connection between the song and King and began to chant, “Neutron Man, Neutron Man”. From that point forward, the Neutron Man would dance at every Ohio State home football game during the third quarter break. King eventually began to wear his scarlet and gray beret and his very own Ohio State Buckeyes jersey with “Neutron Man” printed on the back.

== Contributions ==
Until his death in 2004, King promoted and contributed to the Ohio State Marching Band and Ohio State Cheerleading programs. He helped to raise money for both groups and, being the owner of several restaurants, frequently catered lunches for the students after the marching band and cheerleading tryouts. Spawning from his popularity, a Neutron Man Beanie Baby was even created. A portion of the money generated from sales went to a cheerleading scholarship.

== The Neutron Man Memorial Fund ==
The Neutron Man Memorial Fund was established by his widow, Debbi L. McComb, to benefit the Ohio State Marching Band and the Ohio State Cheerleading programs.
