= Deja Kelly =

American basketball player (born 2001)

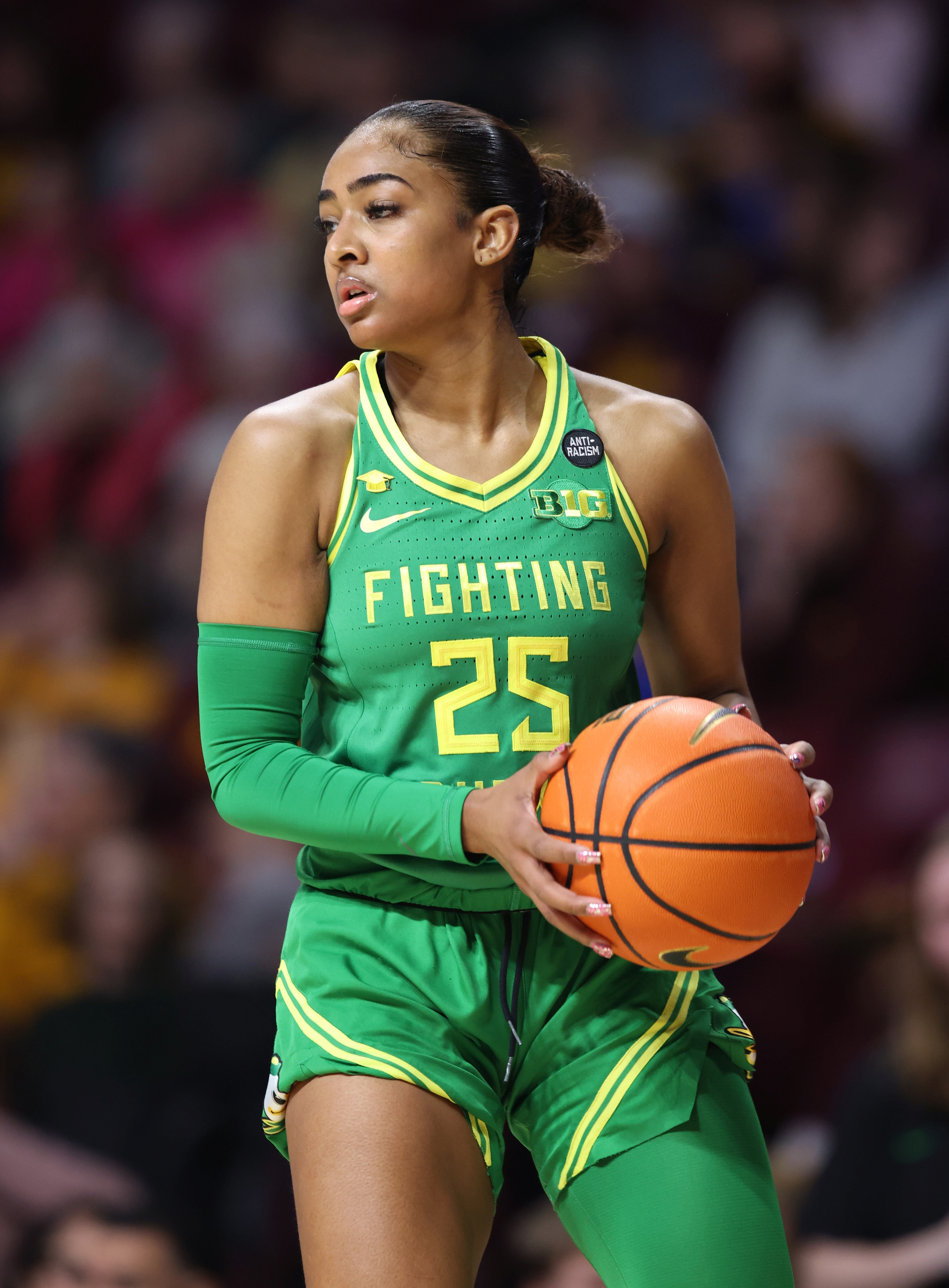
- Kelly with Oregon in 2025

No. 2 – Dallas Wings
- Position: Point guard
- League: WNBA

Personal information
- Born: September 8, 2001 (age 25) San Antonio, Texas, U.S.
- Listed height: 5 ft 8 in (1.73 m)

Career information
- High school: Lady Bird Johnson (San Antonio, Texas); Duncanville (Duncanville, Texas)
- College: North Carolina (2020–2024); Oregon (2024–2025)
- WNBA draft: 2025: undrafted

Career history
- 2026–present: Dallas Wings

Career highlights
- 3× First-team All-ACC (2022–2024); ACC All-Freshman Team (2020); McDonald's All-American (2020)
- Stats at Basketball Reference
Medals
Women's basketball
Representing United States
FIBA AmeriCup
Silver medal – second place	2023 Mexico	Team

Deja Kelly (born September 8, 2001) is an American professional basketball player who currently plays for the Dallas Wings of the WNBA. She played college basketball for the Oregon Ducks and the North Carolina Tar Heels, where she was a three-time first-team All-Atlantic Coast Conference (ACC) selection. Kelly graduated from Duncanville High School in Duncanville, Texas, where she was named a McDonald's All-American.

== Early life and high school career ==
Kelly developed an interest in basketball at age five, playing on courts in San Antonio, Texas. She trained under the guidance of her mother, Theresa Nunn, who also coached her on the Amateur Athletic Union circuit. Kelly drew inspiration from Skylar Diggins. She began playing varsity basketball as a freshman at Lady Bird Johnson High School in San Antonio. In her first year with the team, Kelly averaged 19.2 points, 3.4 steals and 3.1 assists per game and was named San Antonio Express-News Newcomer of the Year. As a sophomore, she averaged 27.7 points and 7.6 rebounds per game, making the San Antonio Express-News Super Team.

Kelly transferred to Duncanville High School in Duncanville, Texas for her junior season. She hoped to gain more national attention by playing at a larger school. Kelly averaged 16 points per game as a junior. She was named District 8-6A Offensive MVP and received SportsDayHS All-Area third team honors from The Dallas Morning News. In her senior season, Kelly averaged 23.5 points, 4.9 rebounds, 2.6 assists and 3.7 steals per game, leading Duncanville to the Class 6A state championship. She earned SportsDayHS Player of the Year and Texas Gatorade Player of the Year recognition. Kelly was selected to play in the McDonald's All-American Game and Jordan Brand Classic, which were canceled due to the COVID-19 pandemic.

=== Recruiting ===
Kelly was considered a five-star recruit and the number 10 player in the 2020 class by ESPN. In seventh grade, she committed to play college basketball for Texas, her father's alma mater, before reopening her recruitment four years later. On November 18, 2019, Kelly committed to North Carolina over offers from Texas A&M, Duke and Minnesota.

== College career ==
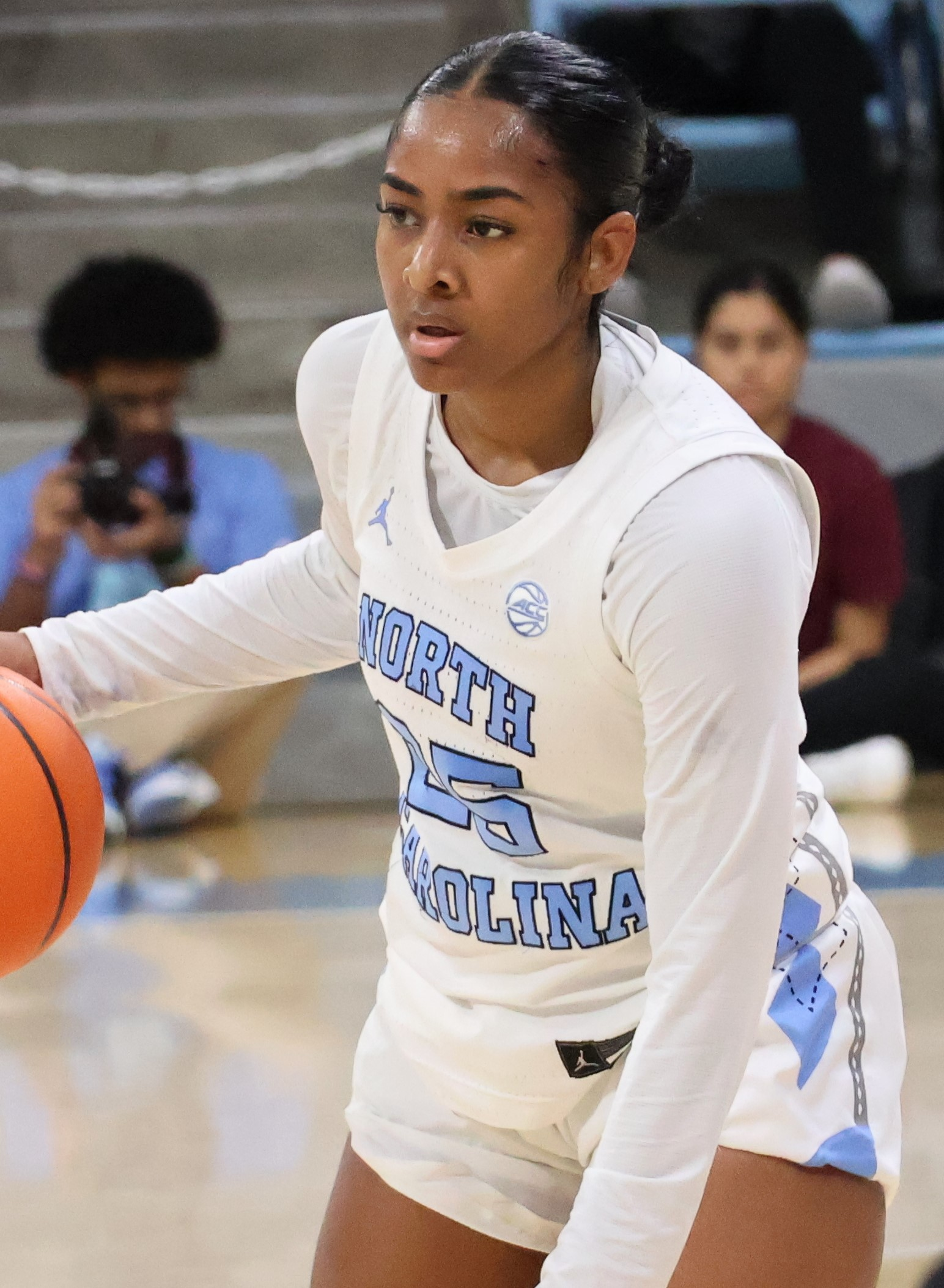
Kelly with North Carolina in 2024

On November 25, 2020, Kelly made her debut for North Carolina, recording 19 points, four rebounds and three assists in a 90–61 win over Radford. On December 17, she posted a season-high 22 points, eight assists and five rebounds in a 92–68 victory against AP No. 18 Syracuse. She matched her season-high in points twice in consecutive wins over Georgia Tech and Virginia Tech in February 2021. As a freshman, Kelly averaged 11 points, 2.9 assists and 2.3 rebounds per game, shooting 32.9 percent from the field. She was a two-time Atlantic Coast Conference (ACC) Freshman of the Week selection and made the ACC All-Freshman Team.

As a sophomore, Kelly had a career-high 31 points along with four rebounds and four assists in an 81–62 win against Clemson on January 2, 2022. One week later, she recorded her first double-double with 15 points and 10 rebounds in a 71–46 win over Virginia Tech. At the 2022 NCAA tournament, Kelly helped North Carolina make its first Sweet 16 appearance in seven years. She averaged 16.5 points, 3.6 rebounds and 2.6 assists per game and shot 85.8 percent from the free throw line, which led the ACC. Kelly earned first-team All-ACC accolades and received Women's Basketball Coaches Association (WBCA) All-American honorable mention.

In her junior season, Kelly cemented herself as one of the top women's basketball players in the ACC. Once again earning first-team all-ACC honors, Kelly started every game in which she played, despite missing one contest due to injury. She set a new career high with 32 points in a 75–67 loss against Syracuse, and on the season led the team in points and assists, averaging 16.3 points and 3.2 assists per game.

== Professional career ==
Kelly went undrafted in the 2025 WNBA draft. On April 18, 2025, she signed a training camp contract with the Las Vegas Aces, joining draftees Aaliyah Nye and Harmoni Turner on a crowded Aces roster.

Kelly made her professional debut on May 2, 2025 in a preseason game against the Dallas Wings. She tallied nine points on 4-5 shooting in just seven minutes. Four days later, Kelly followed up her debut with a game-high 15 points against the Phoenix Mercury, including a game-winning shot with just 4.9 seconds left on the clock.

On May 12, just 10 days after her preseason debut, Kelly was waived by the Aces.

On May 11, 2026, it was announced Kelly has joined the Charlotte Crown of the UpShot League for their inaugural season.

On September 22, 2026, the Dallas Wings announced that they signed her to a developmental contract.

=== Athletes Unlimited ===
In July 2025, Kelly joined Athletes Unlimited Pro Basketball for its fifth season, marking her professional debut with the league following her collegiate career and preseason experience in the WNBA.

== National team career ==
Kelly represented the United States at the 2023 FIBA Women's AmeriCup in Mexico. She averaged 5.9 points, 2.9 assists and 2.6 rebounds per game, helping her team win the silver medal.

== Career statistics ==
Legend
GP	Games played	GS	Games started	MPG	Minutes per game	RPG	Rebounds per game
APG	Assists per game	SPG	Steals per game	BPG	Blocks per game	PPG	Points per game
TO	Turnovers per game	FG%	Field-goal percentage	3P%	3-point field-goal percentage	FT%	Free-throw percentage
**Bold**	Career best	°	League leader

Year	Team	GP	GS	MPG	FG%	3P%	FT%	RPG	APG	SPG	BPG	TO	PPG
2020–21	North Carolina	24	22	28.8	.329	.307	.810	2.3	2.9	.8	0	**1.9**	11.0
2021–22	North Carolina	32	**32**	30.7	.366	**.361**	**.858**	3.6	2.6	1.4	**.2**	2.2	**16.5**
2022–23	North Carolina	32	32	35.4	**.373**	.281	.721	3.9	3.2	1.3	.2	2.4	16.5
2023–24	North Carolina	**33**	**33**	**36.1**	.346	.286	.694	3.9	3.2	1.4	**.3**	2.7	16.3
2024–25	Oregon	32	32	31.8	**.386**	.238	.714	**4.3**	**3.3**	**1.5**	0.1	1.9	12.2
Career		153	152	33.0	36.2	30.3	74.9	3.7	3.0	1.3	0.2	2.2	14.7

== Personal life ==
Kelly's mother, Theresa Nunn, played basketball at Valley City State University and raised her as a single parent. Her father, Darren Kelly, played college basketball for Texas from 1999 to 2001 and was an All-Big 12 selection.

Kelly has signed name, image and likeness (NIL) deals with Beats Electronics, Dunkin' Donuts, Forever 21 and Outback Steakhouse, among other companies. She has equity in the hydration company Drink Barcode as part of an NIL deal.

At the University of North Carolina at Chapel Hill, Kelly majors in broadcast journalism and aspires to become a sports broadcaster after her playing career. She has served as an anchor for Sports Xtra, a student-run show at the UNC Hussman School of Journalism and Media.

In 2023, Kelly attended Kelsey Plum's Dawg Class, an Under Armour-sponsored camp to help top women college athletes transition from collegiate to professional basketball.

In May 2024, Kelly graduated from the University of North Carolina at Chapel Hill with a bachelor's of arts degree in broadcast journalism. She then enrolled in the broadcast journalism master's program at the University of Oregon.
