= Hailey Van Lith =

American basketball player (born 2001)

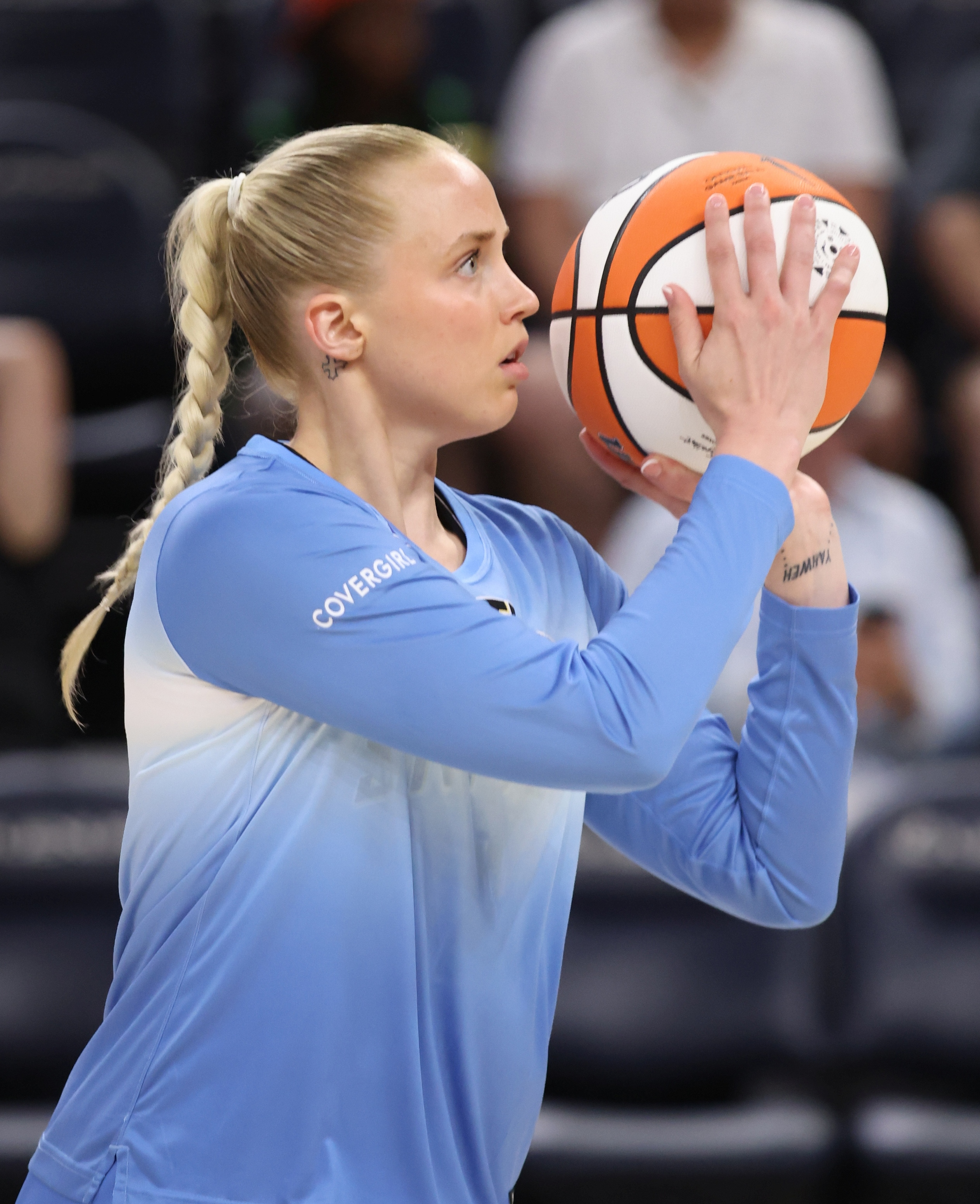
- Van Lith with the Chicago Sky in 2025

No. 2 – Houston Comets
- Position: Point guard
- League: Tauihi Basketball Aotearoa

Personal information
- Born: September 9, 2001 (age 25) Wenatchee, Washington, U.S.
- Listed height: 5 ft 9 in (1.75 m)
- Listed weight: 157 lb (71 kg)

Career information
- High school: Cashmere (Cashmere, Washington)
- College: Louisville (2020–2023); LSU (2023–2024); TCU (2024–2025)
- WNBA draft: 2025: 1st round, 11th overall pick
- Drafted by: Chicago Sky

Career history
- 2025: Chicago Sky
- 2026: Connecticut Sun
- 2026: Tokomanawa Queens
- 2027–present: Houston Comets

Career highlights
- WBCA Coaches' All-American (2025); Third-team All-American – AP, USBWA (2025); Big 12 Player of the Year (2025); Big 12 Newcomer of the Year (2025); First-team All-Big 12 (2025); Big 12 tournament MOP (2025); 2× First-team All-ACC (2022, 2023); ACC All-Freshman Team (2021); McDonald's All-American (2020); Washington Ms. Basketball (2020); FIBA 3x3 Under-18 World Cup MVP (2019)
- Stats at Basketball Reference
Medals
Women's basketball
Representing United States
FIBA Under-19 World Cup
Gold medal – first place	2019 Thailand	Team
FIBA Under-17 World Cup
Gold medal – first place	2018 Belarus	Team
Women's 3x3 basketball
Representing the United States
Olympic Games
Bronze medal – third place	2024 Paris	Team
FIBA 3x3 World Cup
Gold medal – first place	2023 Austria	Team
FIBA 3x3 Under-18 World Cup
Gold medal – first place	2019 Mongolia
Youth Olympic Games
Gold medal – first place	2018 Argentina	Team

Hailey Ann Van Lith (born September 9, 2001) is an American professional basketball player for the Houston Comets of the Women's National Basketball Association (WNBA), currently signed to a player development contract. She played college basketball for the Louisville Cardinals, LSU Tigers, and TCU Horned Frogs.

At Cashmere High School in Cashmere, Washington, Van Lith was rated as one of the top recruits in her class, named a McDonald's All-American and left as the all-time leading scorer in state history. She played her first three college seasons at Louisville, earning first-team All-ACC honors two times and leading the Cardinals to the Final Four as a sophomore in 2022. After her junior season, she transferred to LSU, before moving to TCU for her fifth season. Van Lith was named Big 12 Player of the Year and led TCU to its first Big 12 titles in both the regular season and conference tournament. In the 2025 WNBA draft, she was selected by the Chicago Sky with the 11th pick.

Van Lith has won two gold medals with the United States at the youth international level. In 3x3 basketball, she has played for the senior national team and is a 2023 FIBA 3x3 World Cup gold medalist and a 2024 Summer Olympics bronze medalist. She was named most valuable player (MVP) of the 2019 FIBA 3x3 Under-18 World Cup, where she led her team to a gold medal.

== Early life ==
Van Lith was born in Wenatchee, Washington, to Jessica and Corey Van Lith. Her father played basketball and baseball at the University of Puget Sound, and her parents own a custom home building business. She has one brother, Tanner, who played baseball for Big Bend Community College. Van Lith grew up playing basketball under the guidance of her father, who had her train four to five nights per week. She modeled her game after Diana Taurasi and also drew inspiration from Seattle Storm players Sue Bird and Breanna Stewart. Van Lith was a member of the Northwest Blazers Amateur Athletic Union program under coach Steve Klees. She was the first eighth and ninth-grader to play for the Blazers' top team and started in the Adidas Nationals title game in both years, earning Adidas All-American honors.

== High school career ==
Van Lith played four years of basketball at Cashmere High School in Cashmere, Washington, under head coach Brent Darnell. On November 30, 2016, she made her debut, scoring 14 points in a win over Ellensburg High School. Van Lith led Cashmere to the Class 1A state title game, where she recorded 18 points, 12 rebounds and seven steals in a 45–44 upset loss to Mount Baker Senior High. Her team finished the season with a 26–1 record. As a freshman, she averaged 24.3 points, 6.5 rebounds, 4.3 assists and 3.8 steals per game, earning Associated Press (AP) Class 1A All-State first team honors. In her sophomore season, Van Lith assumed a more important role with the departures of three starters. On January 25, 2018, she recorded the first quadruple-double in program history, with 37 points, 14 steals, 10 rebounds and 10 assists in an 89–34 win over Chelan High School. She helped her team reach the Class 1A state title game, where they lost to Lynden Christian School. Van Lith averaged 32 points, 8.3 rebounds, 7.3 steals and 5.2 assists per game as a sophomore and was named AP Class 1A Player of the Year.

In her junior season, Van Lith led Cashmere to a third-place finish at the Class 1A state tournament, where she was MVP. She averaged 34.4 points, 8.3 rebounds, 5.2 steals and 4.9 assists per game as a junior. Van Lith was named Washington Gatorade Player of the Year and AP Class 1A Player of the Year. Before her senior season, she developed a friendship with Hall of Fame player Kobe Bryant, who was impressed by her work ethic and mentality and viewed her as a role model for his daughter, Gianna. She trained at Bryant's Mamba Sports Academy in Los Angeles and became a friend and mentor for Gianna. On February 15, 2020, Van Lith became the state's all-time leading scorer, a record previously held by Jennifer Stinson since 1995, while scoring 46 points in an 84–28 win over Omak High School at the Caribou Trail League title game. She led Cashmere to a 24–1 record and the Class 1A state title game, where her team lost to Lynden Christian School, and was named tournament MVP. As a senior, Van Lith averaged 32.6 points, 9.4 rebounds, 4.8 assists and 4.2 steals per game. She was honored as Washington Ms. Basketball, Washington Gatorade Player of the Year, The Seattle Times Player of the Year and AP all-class Player of the Year. She was selected to play in the McDonald's All-American Game and the Jordan Brand Classic, but both games were canceled due to the COVID-19 pandemic.

In addition to basketball, Van Lith played softball for Cashmere as a center fielder and shortstop. On April 11, 2017, as a freshman, she hit her first career walk-off home run in a 7–6 win over Cascade High School. She held offers from NCAA Division I softball programs by eighth grade.

=== Recruiting ===
Van Lith was considered a five-star recruit, the number seven player and the top combo guard in the 2020 class by ESPN. She was drawing the interest of NCAA Division I programs by her freshman season. On November 16, 2019, Van Lith committed to playing college basketball for Louisville, choosing the Cardinals over an offer from Baylor.

== College career ==
=== Louisville ===
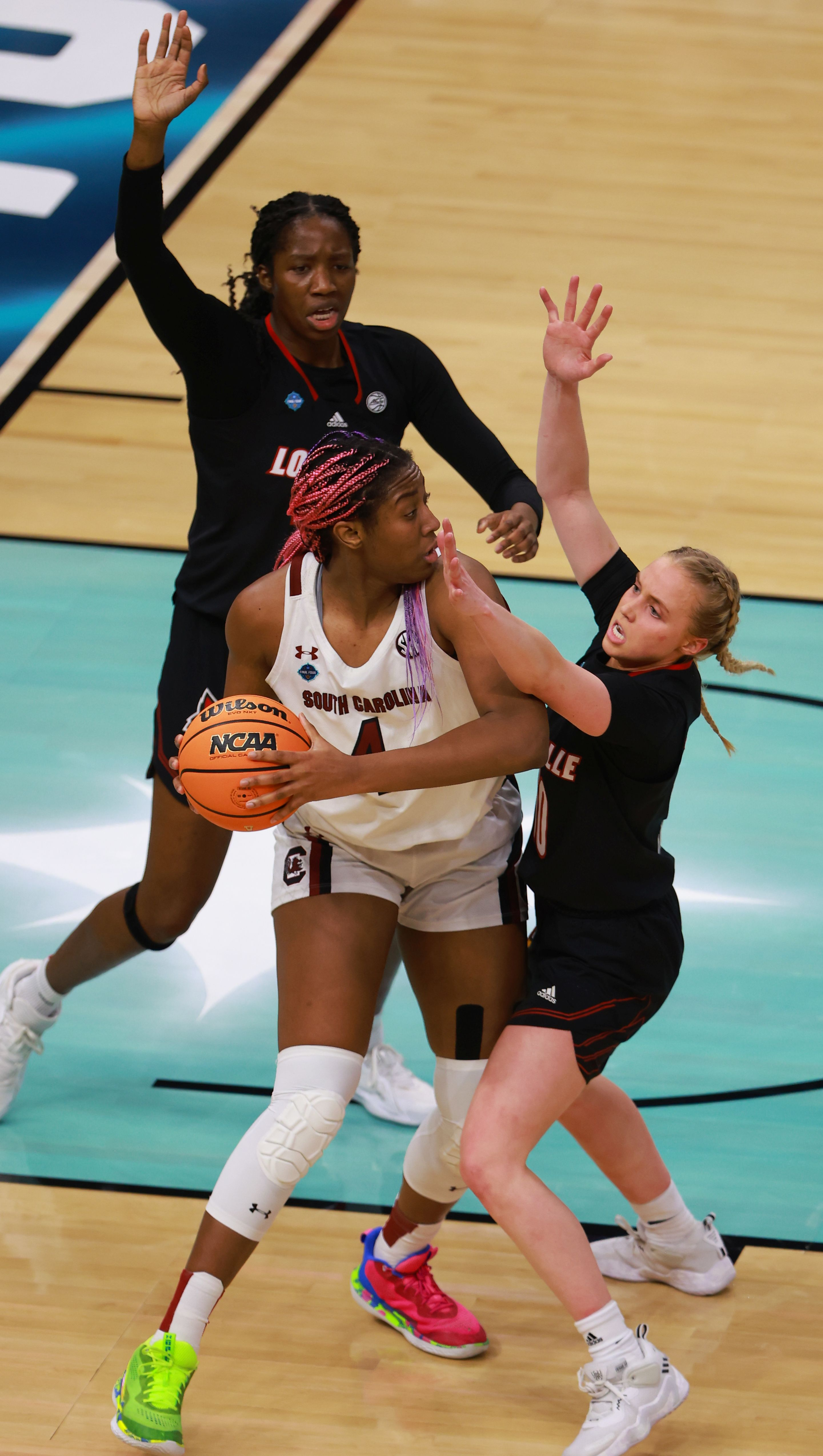
Van Lith (right) defends Aliyah Boston of South Carolina at the 2022 Final Four

Van Lith was the starting point guard for Louisville in her freshman season. On November 25, 2020, she made her collegiate debut and had 13 points and eight rebounds in a 74–53 win over Southeast Missouri State. On March 5, 2021, in the ACC tournament quarterfinals, Van Lith recorded a season-high 24 points, five rebounds and four steals in a 65–53 win against Wake Forest. She was named to the All-ACC tournament first team after helping the Cardinals achieve a runner-up finish. As a freshman, Van Lith averaged 11.2 points, 5.2 rebounds and 2.1 assists per game and was an ACC All-Freshman Team selection. She helped Louisville win the ACC regular season title and reach the Elite Eight of the 2021 NCAA tournament.

In her sophomore season, Van Lith assumed a greater role with the departure of Dana Evans. She scored 19 points in her season debut on November 12, 2021, as her team lost to Arizona, 61–59, in overtime. On December 19, she scored 16 points to help lead Louisville to a 69–64 win over UConn at the Women's Hall of Fame Showcase. On February 3, 2022, Van Lith scored a career-high 34 points in a 93–71 win against Clemson. In the game, she shot 6-of-6 from three-point range, the most three-pointers made without a miss in program history. Van Lith led Louisville to the Final Four of the 2022 NCAA tournament, with four consecutive 20-point games, and was named most outstanding player of the Wichita Regional. She averaged 14.4 points, 3.6 rebounds and 2.2 assists per game as a sophomore, earning first-team All-ACC honors.

Van Lith's role continued to expand in her junior season. In her first game of the season, on November 7, 2022, she scored 28 points in an 87–68 over Cincinnati. On January 12, Van Lith scored a season-high 29 points in an 81–79 loss to Virginia Tech. In the quarterfinals of the 2023 ACC tournament on March 3, she scored 26 points, including 17 in the first quarter, in a 74–48 win over Wake Forest. Van Lith led Louisville to an ACC tournament runner-up finish and was named to the all-tournament first team. At the 2023 NCAA tournament, she had four straight 20-point games and led her team to the Elite Eight, where she scored 27 points in a 97–83 loss to two-seed Iowa. As a junior, Van Lith averaged 19.7 points, 4.5 rebounds and 3.2 assists per game. She was named first-team All-ACC for a second straight season and earned All-America honorable mention from the Associated Press, the United States Basketball Writers Association and the Women's Basketball Coaches Association. Following her junior season, Van Lith entered the transfer portal as a graduate transfer on April 8. ESPN rated her as the top transfer in the nation.

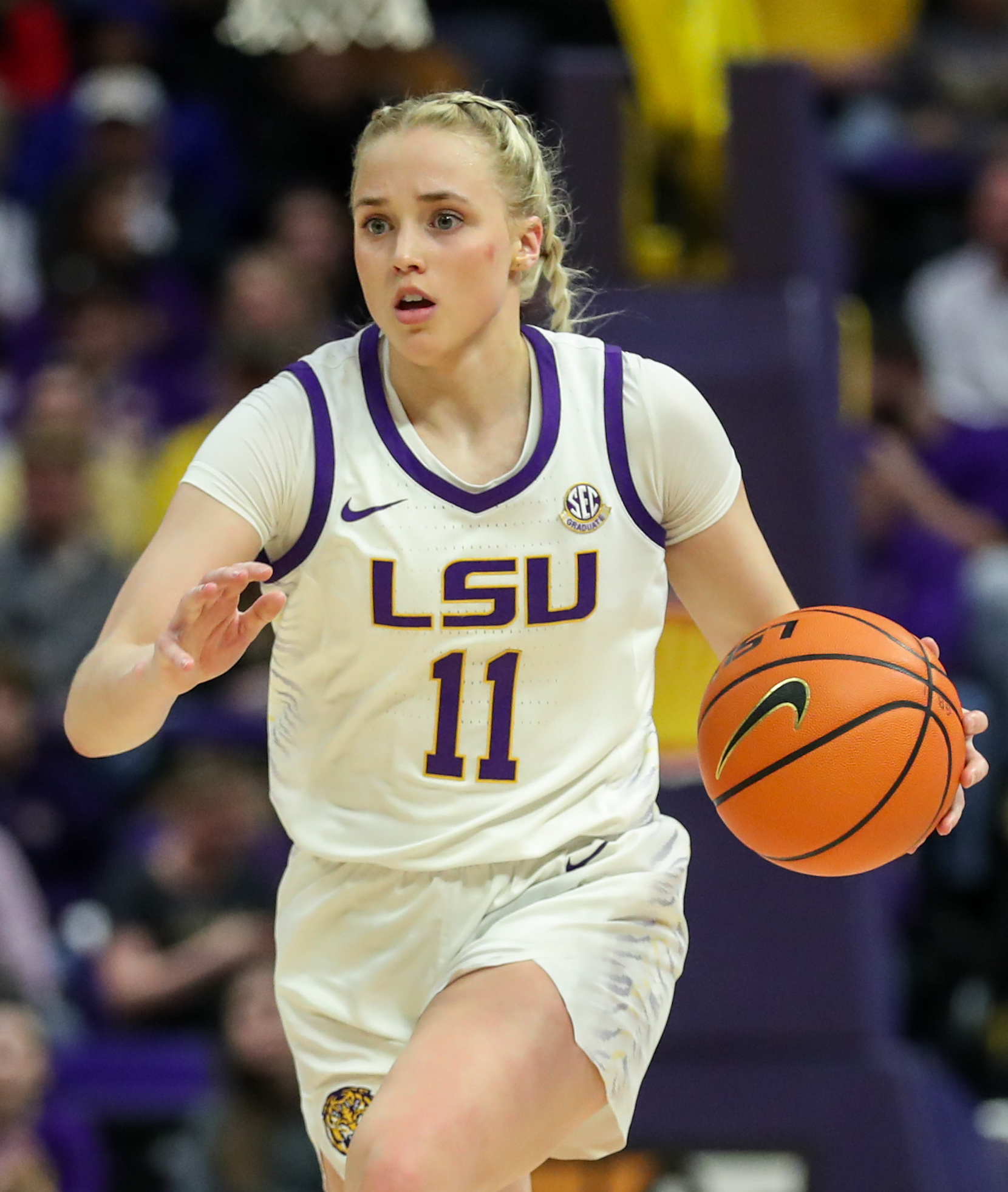
Van Lith with LSU in 2024

=== LSU ===
On April 27, 2023, Van Lith announced that she would transfer to reigning national champion LSU. She was drawn to the school's support for the women's basketball team and the intensity of the team, and she had a relationship with head coach Kim Mulkey since high school. The team entered the season at No. 1 in the AP poll. On November 6, 2023, Van Lith made her debut for LSU, recording 14 points and seven assists in a 92–78 loss to AP No. 20 Colorado. On February 25, 2024, she scored a season-high 26 points in a 75–60 win over Tennessee. Van Lith averaged 11.6 points and 3.6 assists per game as a senior, as her team reached the Elite Eight of the 2024 NCAA tournament. Her decline in scoring volume and efficiency compared to her previous seasons was scrutinized by analysts. On April 4, 2024, she entered the transfer portal for a second time.

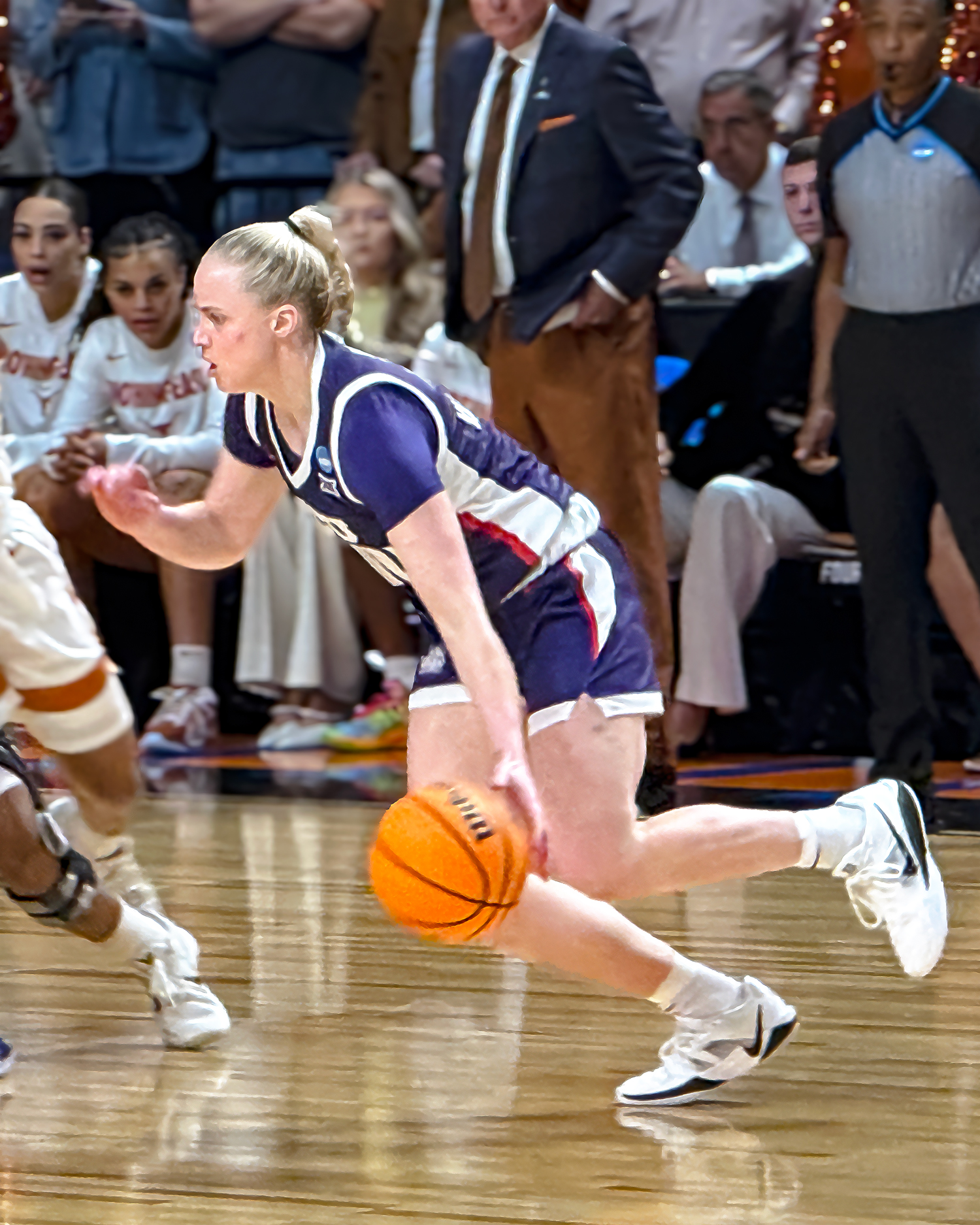
Hailey Van Lith with TCU in 2025

=== TCU ===
On April 27, 2024, Van Lith announced she would transfer to TCU for the 2024–25 season. On February 2, 2025, she had a season-high 28 points, eight assists, and five rebounds in an 82–69 win over Iowa State. Van Lith led TCU to its first Big 12 Conference regular season championship. She was named the conference's Player of the Year and Newcomer of the Year, becoming the first to win both awards in the same season. Van Lith helped her team win its first Big 12 tournament title, where she was named Most Outstanding Player after scoring 20 points in a 64–59 victory over Baylor in the final.

== Professional career ==
=== WNBA ===
==== Chicago Sky (2025–2026) ====
Van Lith was selected as the 11th overall pick in the 2025 WNBA draft by the Chicago Sky. Before the season opener, she was listed as questionable due to an ankle injury but was later upgraded to probable. On May 17, 2025, Van Lith made her WNBA debut late in the fourth quarter of the Sky's 93–58 loss to the Indiana Fever, recording four points in four minutes of play. Her standout performance of the season came on June 15 against the Connecticut Sun, when she led the Sky with 16 points and added five rebounds, an assist and a block. Van Lith's rookie campaign ended prematurely as she missed the final seven games of the season due to ongoing ankle issues. Over the course of her debut year, she appeared in 29 games, averaging 3.5 points, 1.1 rebounds, and 1.6 assists in 12.4 minutes per game, spending much of the season coming off the bench. On October 9, she revealed on social media that she had undergone surgery to address her ankle injury, sharing a photo of herself in a hospital bed with her right ankle bandaged.

On May 4, 2026, the Sky waived Van Lith.

=== Connecticut Sun (2026–present) ===
On May 6, 2026, the Connecticut Sun claimed Van Lith off waivers. In nine appearances for Connecticut, she averaged 8.1 points and 2.2 assists per game. On May 28, the Sun waived Van Lith.

On May 30, 2026, Van Lith signed a developmental contract with the Sun.

== National team career ==
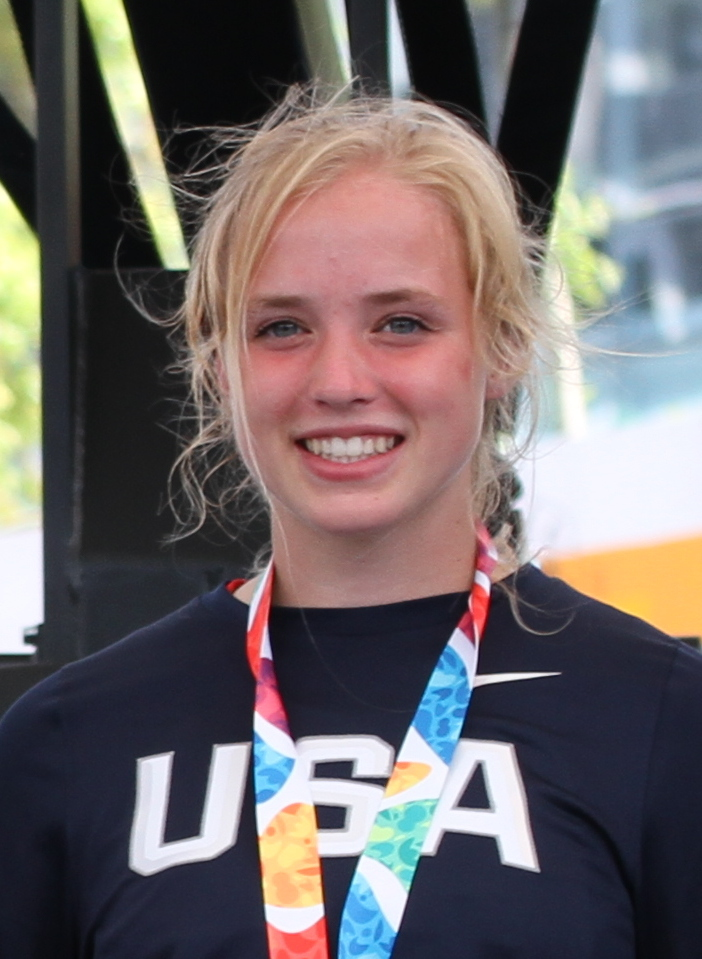
Van Lith at the 2018 Summer Youth Olympics medal ceremony

Van Lith represented the United States at the 2018 FIBA Under-17 World Cup in Belarus and won a gold medal. She averaged five points and two assists in 13.6 minutes per game in the tournament. At the 2019 FIBA Under-19 World Cup in Thailand, Van Lith averaged 9.1 points, 2.3 rebounds and 2.3 assists per game, helping the United States win the gold medal. In the final, she scored 16 points and made the game-tying basket in regulation to help her team defeat Australia, 74–70, in overtime.

In 3x3 basketball, Van Lith won a gold medal with the United States at the 2018 Summer Youth Olympics in Argentina. She led her team to another gold medal at the 2019 FIBA 3x3 Under-18 World Cup in Mongolia, where she was named MVP.

With the senior national 3x3 team, Van Lith played at the 2022 FIBA 3x3 World Cup in Belgium, leading the United States to the quarterfinals. At the 2023 FIBA 3x3 World Cup in Austria, she helped the team win the gold medal, recording seven points and six rebounds in a 16–12 win over France in the final. At the 2024 Summer Olympics, she won a bronze medal in the 3x3 tournament and was named to the Team of the Tournament.

== Career statistics ==
Legend
GP	Games played	GS	Games started	MPG	Minutes per game	RPG	Rebounds per game
APG	Assists per game	SPG	Steals per game	BPG	Blocks per game	PPG	Points per game
TO	Turnovers per game	FG%	Field-goal percentage	3P%	3-point field-goal percentage	FT%	Free-throw percentage
**Bold**	Career best	°	League leader

=== WNBA ===
==== Regular season ====
Stats current through end of 2026 regular season

WNBA regular season statistics
Year	Team	GP	GS	MPG	FG%	3P%	FT%	RPG	APG	SPG	BPG	TO	PPG
2025	Chicago	29	0	12.4	.339	.161	.742	1.1	1.6	0.4	0.1	1.2	3.5
2026	Connecticut	22	3	15.9	.425	.324	.857	1.6	2.1	0.7	0.2	1.2	5.5
**Career**	2 years, 2 teams	51	3	13.9	.383	.250	.778	1.3	1.8	0.5	0.2	1.2	4.4

=== College ===
Year	Team	GP	GS	MPG	FG%	3P%	FT%	RPG	APG	SPG	BPG	TO	PPG
2020–21	Louisville	30	30	30.1	.429	**.383**	.830	**5.2**	2.1	1.2	.2	**1.7**	11.2
2021–22	Louisville	34	34	30.9	.432	.360	.813	3.6	2.2	1.2	.1	2.1	14.4
2022–23	Louisville	37	37	**36.9**	.411	.293	**.874**	4.5	3.2	**1.5**	.3	3.7	**19.7**
2023–24	LSU	33	33	31.3	.378	.339	.833	2.4	3.6	1.3	.4	2.6	11.6
2024–25	TCU	**38**	**38**	35.3	**.452**	.338	.827	4.6	**5.4**	1.2	**.6**	3.0	17.9
**Career**		172	172	33.1	.422	.338	.840	4.1	3.4	1.3	.3	2.7	15.2
Statistics retrieved from Sports Reference.

== Personal life ==
Van Lith is a Christian. She was baptized in 2023 and said it was the "Best day of my life." She has also said, "My greatest success in life is to offer my life to serve Jesus."

Van Lith is represented by the sports agency Octagon. She has been described as one of the most marketable women's college basketball players. Van Lith has signed name, image and likeness deals with Adidas, JCPenney and Dick's Sporting Goods. On February 25, 2023, she announced that she donated $30,000 to the Louisville nonprofit Family Scholar House to provide tablets for its children's technology program.

Van Lith graduated from the University of Louisville in three years with a degree in finance. She was a three-time All-ACC Academic Team selection at Louisville. In her junior year, Van Lith was named a second-team Academic All-American by College Sports Communicators. On August 16, 2024, she graduated from LSU with a master's degree.

In 2023, Van Lith attended Kelsey Plum's Dawg Class, an Under Armour-sponsored camp to help top women college athletes transition from collegiate to professional basketball.
