= Kettering City School District =

School district in Ohio

Coordinates: 39°41′50″N 84°9′8″W

Kettering City School District is a school district located in Kettering, Ohio.It was named a "Top 100" school district by Money magazine in 1995. It is the second largest district in Montgomery County and currently serves about 8,000 student and has enjoyed modest growth in enrollment since the early 1990s.

== Classes & programs ==
Students at the middle and high schools can choose from among more than 200 courses during their secondary years. With strong gifted, honors, advanced placement and vocational education programs, Kettering secondary schools offer something for every student. The district, likewise, offers a full range of courses at the elementary level, and has a special education program. The district has nine elementary schools, serving kindergartners through fifth-graders; two middle schools serving sixth-, seventh- and eighth-graders; and a four-year high school. Kettering Fairmont High School is considered a "comprehensive" high school, providing both college preparatory and school to work opportunities for students. High school students continually rate in the top brackets on various college entrance and National Merit exams, and more than 100 students have received National Merit Scholarship recognition over the past decade. Currently, about 80 percent of Fairmont's graduates go on to post-secondary education.

== High schools ==
- Kettering Fairmont High School

== Middle schools ==
- Kettering Fairmont Middle School

== Elementary schools ==
- Beavertown
- Greenmont
- Indian Riffle
- J.E. Prass
- John F. Kennedy
- Oakview
- Orchard Park
- Southdale
- Moraine Medows (early childhood educational center)
