= 2025 Chicago Sky season =

- Head coach: Tyler Marsh
- Arena: Wintrust Arena

Results
- Record: 10–34 (.227)
- Place: 6th (Eastern)
- Playoff finish: Did not qualify

The 2025 Chicago Sky season was franchise's 20th season in the Women's National Basketball Association, and their first season under head coach Tyler Marsh, who was hired on November 3, 2024.

On May 18, 2025, the WNBA announced that they had opened an investigation regarding "allegations of inappropriate fan conduct" directed at Sky players occurring during their May 17 season opener at the Indiana Fever. Sky head coach, Tyler Marsh, told the press that he and his team did not report or witness any misconduct while at Gainbridge Fieldhouse and only learned about the allegations after the game had concluded. Nine days later, the WNBA announced their investigation was complete, and all allegations of racist fan behavior were unsubstantiated.

On June 8, 2025, it was announced that newly signed guard, Courtney Vandersloot, sustained a right anterior cruciate ligament (ACL) tear during the June 7 game against the Indiana Fever and would miss the rest of the season.

== Draft ==
Round	Pick	Player	Position	Nationality	College/Club	Outcome	Ref.
1	10	Ajša Sivka	F	Slovenia	Tarbes Gespe Bigorre	Rights retained	
1	11	Hailey Van Lith	G	United States	TCU	Signed rookie contract April 23; Made opening day roster	
2	16	Maddy Westbeld	F	United States	Notre Dame	Signed rookie contract April 22; Made opening day roster	
2	22	Aicha Coulibaly	G	Mali	Texas A&M	Rights retained	

== Transactions ==
=== Front office and coaching ===
Date	Details	Ref.
September 27, 2024	Fired head coach, Teresa Weatherspoon	
November 3, 2024	Hired Tyler Marsh as head coach	
December 18, 2024	Hired Courtney Paris as an assistant coach	
January 4, 2025	Hired Tanisha Wright as an assistant coach	
March 24, 2025	Hired Rena Wakama as an assistant coach	
March 27, 2025	Hired Donnie Marsh as a basketball operations specialist	
March 27, 2025	Promoted David Simon to director of player development	
April 21, 2025	Hired Aaron Johnson as a player development coach	

=== Trades ===
February
February 4	To Chicago Sky Rebecca Allen	To Connecticut Sun Lindsay Allen; Rights to Nikolina Milić
February 7	To Chicago Sky 2025 No. 16 draft pick 2025 No. 22 draft pick	To Las Vegas Aces Dana Evans (sign-and-trade)
February 23	To Chicago Sky Ariel Atkins	To Washington Mystics 2025 No. 3 draft pick 2027 second round draft pick Rights to swap 2027 first round draft picks
April
April 13	To Chicago Sky 2025 No. 11 draft pick	To Minnesota Lynx Outright 2026 first-round draft pick Extinguished previous right to exchange 2026 first round draft picks with Chicago

=== Free agency ===
==== Re-signed ====
Player	Date	Notes	Ref.
Michaela Onyenwere	February 2, 2025	One-year deal	
Kamilla Cardoso	July 9, 2025	Set as active	

==== Additions ====
Player	Date	Notes	Former Team	Ref.
Courtney Vandersloot	February 1	One-year deal	New York Liberty	
Kia Nurse	February 4	One-year deal	Los Angeles Sparks	
Arella Guirantes	February 22	Training camp contract	Shanghai Swordfish (China)	
Alex Wilson	February 27	Training camp contract	Perth Lynx (Australia)	
Morgan Bertsch	March 3	Training camp contract	Hozono Global Jairis (Spain)	
Tilly Boler	April 16	Training camp contract	Memphis Tigers	
Sammie Puisis	April 16	Training camp contract	South Florida Bulls	
Jessika Carter	April 17	Training camp contract	Las Vegas Aces	
Maddy Westbeld	April 22	Rookie contract (2025 draft pick – No. 16)	Notre Dame Fighting Irish	
Hailey Van Lith	April 23	Rookie contract (2025 draft pick – No. 11)	TCU Horned Frogs	
Marquesha Davis	July 22	7-day hardship contract	Free agent	
Sevgi Uzun	July 28	Rest of season contract	Free agent	

=== Subtractions / unsigned ===
Player	Date	Reason	New Team	Ref.
María Conde	December 6, 2024	Expansion draft	Golden State Valkyries	
Diamond DeShields	February 3, 2025	Free agency – unrestricted	Connecticut Sun	
Brianna Turner	February 16, 2025	Free agency – unrestricted	Indiana Fever	
Isabelle Harrison	February 21, 2025	Free agency – unrestricted	New York Liberty	
Aicha Coulibaly	April 14, 2025	Unsigned draft pick (2025 draft pick – No. 22)	N/A – retained rights	
Ajša Sivka	April 14, 2025	Unsigned draft pick (2025 draft pick – No. 10)	N/A – retained rights	
Chennedy Carter (Note: Initially was a restricted free agent. However, did not receive qualifying offer from the Sky prior to February 1 and became an unrestricted free agent.)	April 25, 2025	Free agency – unrestricted	Adelitas de Chihuahua	
Tilly Boler	May 3, 2025	Waived	—	
Arella Guirantes	May 3, 2025	Waived	—	
Sammie Puisis	May 3, 2025	Waived	—	
Morgan Bertsch	May 11, 2025	Waived	—	
Jessika Carter	May 11, 2025	Waived	—	
Alex Wilson	May 11, 2025	Waived	—	
Kamilla Cardoso	June 25, 2025	Suspended contract – temporary	N/A – retained rights	
Moriah Jefferson	July 28, 2025	Waived	—	
Marquesha Davis	July 28, 2025	Released	—	

== Roster ==
2025 Chicago Sky roster
Players
Coaches

Pos.	No.	Nat.	Name	Height	Weight	DOB	From	Yrs
G/F	9	(Australia)	Allen, Rebecca	6' 2" (1.88m)	162 lb (73kg)	1992-11-06	Australia	9
G	7	(United States)	Atkins, Ariel (injured)	5' 8" (1.73m)	167 lb (76kg)	1996-07-30	Texas	7
G	24	(United States)	Banham, Rachel	5' 9" (1.75m)	175 lb (79kg)	1993-07-15	Minnesota	9
C	10	(Brazil)	Cardoso, Kamilla	6' 7" (2.01m)	215 lb (98kg)	2001-04-30	South Carolina	1
G	11	(Canada)	Nurse, Kia	6' 0" (1.83m)	181 lb (82kg)	1996-02-22	Connecticut	6
F	12	(United States)	Onyenwere, Michaela	6' 0" (1.83m)	178 lb (81kg)	1999-08-10	UCLA	4
F	5	(United States)	Reese, Angel (injured)	6' 3" (1.91m)	165 lb (75kg)	2002-05-06	LSU	1
G	0	(Turkey)	Uzun, Sevgi	5' 10" (1.78m)	141 lb (64kg)	1997-11-25	Turkey	1
G	22	(Hungary)	Vandersloot, Courtney (injured)	5' 8" (1.73m)	137 lb (62kg)	1989-02-08	Gonzaga	14
G	2	(United States)	Van Lith, Hailey (injured)	5' 9" (1.75m)	155 lb (70kg)	2001-09-09	TCU	R
F	21	(United States)	Westbeld, Maddy	6' 3" (1.91m)		2002-02-10	Notre Dame	R
C	1	(United States)	Williams, Elizabeth	6' 3" (1.91m)	200 lb (91kg)	1993-06-23	Duke	10
G	–	(Mali)	Coulibaly, Aicha (DP)	6' 0" (1.83m)		2001-10-18	Texas A&M	–
F	–	(Slovenia)	Sivka, Ajša (DP)	6' 4" (1.93m)		2005-11-23	Slovenia	–

Head coach
(United States) Tyler Marsh (Birmingham–Southern)
Assistant coaches
(United States) Courtney Paris (Oklahoma)
(United States) Rena Wakama (Western Carolina)
(United States) Tanisha Wright (Penn State)
Player development
(United States) David Simon (Purdue Fort Wayne)
Athletic trainer
(United States) Meghan Lockerby
Strength and conditioning coach
(United States) Ann Crosby

Legend

- (C) Team captain
- (DP) Unsigned draft pick
- (FA) Free agent
- (S) Suspended
- Injured

=== Depth chart ===
Pos.	Starter	Bench
PG	Courtney Vandersloot	Sevgi Uzun; Hailey Van Lith
SG	Ariel Atkins	Rachel Banham
SF	Kia Nurse	Rebecca Allen; Michaela Onyenwere
PF	Angel Reese	Maddy Westbeld
C	Kamilla Cardoso	Elizabeth Williams

== Schedule ==
=== Preseason ===
2025 game log
Total: 2–1 (Home: 2–0; Road: 0–1)
May: 2–1 (Home: 2–0; Road: 0–1)

Game	Date	Team	Score	High points	High rebounds	High assists	Location Attendance	Record
1	May 2	Brazil	W 89–62	Angel Reese (15)	Angel Reese (10)	Van Lith, Vandersloot (5)	Pete Maravich Assembly Center; 6,373	1–0
2	May 6	Minnesota	W 74–69	Courtney Vandersloot (11)	Angel Reese (8)	Van Lith, Vandersloot (5)	Wintrust Arena; 4,688	2–0
3	May 10	@ Minnesota	L 87–92	Banham, Nurse (14)	Kamilla Cardoso (8)	Atkins, Reese (6)	Target Center; 7,615	2–1

2025 season schedule

=== Regular season ===
2025 game log
Total: 10–34 (Home: 6–16; Road: 4–18)
May: 2–4 (Home: 1–1; Road: 1–3)

Game	Date	Team	Score	High points	High rebounds	High assists	Location Attendance	Record
1	May 17	@ Indiana	L 58–93	Angel Reese (12)	Angel Reese (17)	Courtney Vandersloot (5)	Gainbridge Fieldhouse; 17,274	0–1
2	May 22	New York	L 74–99	Rachel Banham (15)	Angel Reese (12)	Hailey Van Lith (6)	Wintrust Arena; 9,025	0–2
3	May 25	@ Los Angeles	L 78–91	Angel Reese (13)	Angel Reese (12)	Ariel Atkins (5)	Crypto.com Arena; 11,422	0–3
4	May 27	@ Phoenix	L 89–94	Ariel Atkins (21)	Angel Reese (15)	Courtney Vandersloot (11)	PHX Arena; 8,818	0–4
5	May 29	Dallas	W 97–92	Kamilla Cardoso (23)	Angel Reese (9)	Courtney Vandersloot (9)	Wintrust Arena; 9,025	1–4
6	May 31	@ Dallas	W 94–83	Ariel Atkins (26)	Angel Reese (9)	Courtney Vandersloot (7)	College Park Center; 6,251	2–4

June: 3–7 (Home: 1–3; Road: 2–4)

Game	Date	Team	Score	High points	High rebounds	High assists	Location Attendance	Record
7	June 7	Indiana	L 52–79	Allen, Cardoso (8)	Angel Reese (12)	Ariel Atkins (3)	United Center; 18,496	2–5
8	June 10	@ New York	L 66–85	Angel Reese (17)	Angel Reese (11)	Rachel Banham (5)	Barclays Center; 16,081	2–6
9	June 13	@ Atlanta	L 70–88	Kamilla Cardoso (15)	Cardoso, Reese (9)	Ariel Atkins (5)	Gateway Center Arena; 3,296	2–7
10	June 15	@ Connecticut	W 78–66	Hailey Van Lith (16)	Angel Reese (13)	Angel Reese (11)	Mohegan Sun Arena; 8,451	3–7
11	June 17	Washington	L 72–79	Kamilla Cardoso (18)	Cardoso, Reese (10)	Ariel Atkins (7)	Wintrust Arena; 7,579	3–8
12	June 21	Phoenix	L 86–104	Cardoso, Onyenwere (17)	Tied (3)	Rachel Banham (6)	Wintrust Arena; 7,291	3–9
13	June 22	@ Atlanta	L 80–93	Ariel Atkins (29)	Angel Reese (19)	Banham, Reese (4)	Gateway Center Arena; 3,283	3–10
14	June 24	Los Angeles	W 97–86	Kamilla Cardoso (27)	Angel Reese (17)	Angel Reese (6)	Wintrust Arena; 8,004	4–10
15	June 27	@ Golden State	L 78–83	Ariel Atkins (20)	Angel Reese (18)	Atkins, Nurse (3)	Chase Center; 18,064	4–11
16	June 29	@ Los Angeles	W 92–85	Angel Reese (24)	Angel Reese (16)	Angel Reese (7)	Crypto.com Arena; 13,523	5–11

July : 2–8 (Home: 2–4; Road: 0–4)

Game	Date	Team	Score	High points	High rebounds	High assists	Location Attendance	Record
17	July 6	@ Minnesota	L 75–80	Rachel Banham (20)	Angel Reese (17)	Atkins, Reese (6)	Target Center; 8,810	5–12
18	July 8	@ Washington	L 79–81	Angel Reese (22)	Angel Reese (15)	Ariel Atkins (5)	EagleBank Arena; 9,350	5–13
19	July 9	Dallas	W 87–76	Rebecca Allen (27)	Angel Reese (11)	Elizabeth Williams (6)	Wintrust Arena; 9,025	6–13
20	July 12	Minnesota	W 87–81	Ariel Atkins (27)	Kamilla Cardoso (15)	Rachel Banham (5)	Wintrust Arena; 9,025	7–13
21	July 14	Minnesota	L 78–91	Angel Reese (22)	Angel Reese (10)	Allen, Atkins, Reese, Williams (3)	Wintrust Arena; 8,105	7–14
22	July 16	Atlanta	L 49–86	Rebecca Allen (9)	Kamilla Cardoso (11)	Moriah Jefferson (5)	Wintrust Arena; 9,085	7–15
All-Star Game
23	July 22	@ Minnesota	L 68–91	Kia Nurse (16)	Angel Reese (11)	Hailey Van Lith (4)	Target Center; 8,821	7–16
24	July 24	Seattle	L 57–95	Banham, Cardoso (13)	Kamilla Cardoso (13)	Hailey Van Lith (5)	Wintrust Arena; 7,750	7–17
25	July 27	Indiana	L 78–93	Rachel Banham (26)	Kamilla Cardoso (12)	Rachel Banham (5)	United Center; 19,601	7–18
26	July 29	@ Washington	L 86–103	Angel Reese (22)	Angel Reese (13)	Banham, Nurse, Reese, Williams (3)	CareFirst Arena; 4,200	7–19

August : 3–10 (Home: 1–7; Road: 2–3)

Game	Date	Team	Score	High points	High rebounds	High assists	Location Attendance	Record
27	August 1	Golden State	L 66–73	Elizabeth Williams (15)	Kamilla Cardoso (11)	Banham, Nurse (7)	Wintrust Arena; 7,714	7–20
28	August 3	Phoenix	L 67–83	Elizabeth Williams (15)	Elizabeth Williams (15)	Sevgi Uzun (4)	Wintrust Arena; 7,081	7–21
29	August 5	Washington	W 78–64	Elizabeth Williams (18)	Kamilla Cardoso (13)	Atkins, Uzun (5)	Wintrust Arena; 6,572	8–21
30	August 7	Atlanta	L 65–86	Rachel Banham (18)	Kamilla Cardoso (6)	Kamilla Cardoso (5)	Wintrust Arena; 7,221	8–22
31	August 9	@ Indiana	L 70–92	Rachel Banham (11)	Kamilla Cardoso (12)	Banham, Cardoso, Van Lith (3)	Gainbridge Fieldhouse; 17,274	8–23
32	August 13	@ Connecticut	L 62–71	Kamilla Cardoso (24)	Elizabeth Williams (15)	Cardoso, Williams (3)	Mohegan Sun Arena; 6,848	8–24
33	August 15	Golden State	L 59–90	Rachel Banham (15)	Ariel Atkins (6)	Kamilla Cardoso (5)	Wintrust Arena; 7,804	8–25
34	August 19	Seattle	L 88–94	Atkins, Reese (19)	Elizabeth Williams (9)	Kamilla Cardoso (6)	Wintrust Arena; 6,724	8–26
35	August 21	@ New York	W 91–85	Kamilla Cardoso (22)	Kamilla Cardoso (15)	Atkins, Cardoso (5)	Barclays Center; 15,887	9–26
36	August 23	Connecticut	L 84–94	Kia Nurse (19)	Angel Reese (11)	Cardoso, Reese (5)	Wintrust Arena; 8,412	9–27
37	August 25	Las Vegas	L 74–79	Ariel Atkins (30)	Angel Reese (17)	Ariel Atkins (7)	Wintrust Arena; 9,103	9–28
38	August 28	@ Phoenix	L 79–83	Kia Nurse (17)	Angel Reese (20)	Cardoso, Nurse, Reese (4)	PHX Arena; 10,445	9–29
39	August 30	@ Seattle	L 69–79	Angel Reese (20)	Cardoso, Reese (10)	Ariel Atkins (8)	Climate Pledge Arena; 12,500	9–30

September : 1–4 (Home: 1–1; Road: 0–3)

Game	Date	Team	Score	High points	High rebounds	High assists	Location Attendance	Record
40	September 3	Connecticut	W 88–64	Angel Reese (18)	Angel Reese (13)	Banham, Onyenwere, Reese, Uzun (4)	Wintrust Arena; 7,195	10–30
41	September 5	@ Indiana	L 77–97	Cardoso, Onyenwere (18)	Elizabeth Williams (11)	Kamilla Cardoso (5)	Gainbridge Fieldhouse; 16,012	10–31
42	September 7	@ Las Vegas	L 66–80	Banham, Onyenwere (12)	Kamilla Cardoso (15)	Sevgi Uzun (6)	T-Mobile Arena; 17,306	10–32
43	September 9	@ Las Vegas	L 61–92	Cardoso, Onyenwere (13)	Kamilla Cardoso (13)	Kamilla Cardoso (3)	T-Mobile Arena; 15,640	10–33
44	September 11	New York	L 86–91	Maddy Westbeld (25)	Maddy Westbeld (7)	Rachel Banham (10)	Wintrust Arena; 8,824	10–34

2025 season schedule

Notes:

- Games highlighted in ██ represent Commissioner's Cup games.

== Standings ==
#	Team	W	L	PCT	GB	Conf.	Home	Road	Cup
1	yx – Minnesota Lynx	34	10	.773	–	20–4	20–2	14–8	5–1
2	x – Las Vegas Aces	30	14	.682	4	16–8	17–5	13–9	2–4
3	x – Atlanta Dream	30	14	.682	4	15–6	16–6	14–8	3–2
4	x – Phoenix Mercury	27	17	.614	7	13–11	15–7	12–10	4–2
5	x – New York Liberty	27	17	.614	7	15–5	17–5	10–12	4–1
6	cx – Indiana Fever	24	20	.545	10	13–8	13–9	11–11	4–1
7	x – Seattle Storm	23	21	.523	11	12–12	10–12	13–9	4–2
8	x – Golden State Valkyries	23	21	.523	11	9–15	14–8	9–13	3–3
9	e – Los Angeles Sparks	21	23	.477	13	10–14	9–13	12–10	2–4
10	e – Washington Mystics	16	28	.364	18	8–12	10–12	6–16	2–3
11	e – Connecticut Sun	11	33	.250	23	7–14	7–15	4–18	1–4
12	e – Chicago Sky	10	34	.227	24	4–17	6–16	4–18	1–4
13	e – Dallas Wings	10	34	.227	24	4–20	6–16	4–18	1–5

Notes

(#) – League Standing
c – Commissioner's Cup winners
y – Regular Season Champion
x – Clinched playoff berth
e – Eliminated from playoff contention
Source: Overall standings and Commissioner's Cup Standings

== Statistics ==
Legend
GP	Games played	GS	Games started	MPG	Minutes per game	RPG	Rebounds per game
APG	Assists per game	SPG	Steals per game	BPG	Blocks per game	PPG	Points per game
FG%	Field-goal percentage	3P%	3-point field-goal percentage	FT%	Free-throw percentage	TO	Turnovers per game
PF	Fouls per game		Team leader		League leader

=== Regular season ===
Player	GP	GS	MPG	FG%	3P%	FT%	RPG	APG	SPG	BPG	TO	PF	PPG
Angel Reese	30	30	31.6	45.8%	18.2%	75.6%	12.6	3.7	1.5	0.7	3.9	3.4	14.7
Ariel Atkins	34	34	28.6	44.4%	36.1%	86.0%	3.4	3.6	1.6	0.7	2.5	3.0	13.1
Kamilla Cardoso	40	39	27.6	52.8%	50.0%	72.2%	8.5	2.5	0.4	1.2	2.4	2.8	13.6
Courtney Vandersloot	7	7	27.3	43.9%	21.7%	84.6%	3.1	5.3	1.6	0.3	2.4	1.9	10.6
Rachel Banham	44	33	24.6	38.2%	35.7%	88.1%	1.7	2.7	0.6	0.3	1.6	1.9	9.0
Kia Nurse	44	18	21.9	35.4%	33.5%	79.0%	2.3	1.3	0.3	0.0	1.3	1.6	7.2
Elizabeth Williams	43	15	21.1	48.0%	—	61.7%	5.2	1.8	0.7	0.9	1.3	1.4	8.5
Rebecca Allen	44	17	18.7	34.2%	31.8%	61.3%	2.6	1.3	0.5	0.5	0.9	1.4	5.1
Sevgi Uzun	18	3	18.7	34.6%	18.2%	70.0%	1.4	2.7	0.5	—	1.8	1.6	3.7
Michaela Onyenwere	42	22	16.9	42.2%	35.3%	84.3%	1.6	1.1	0.4	0.1	1.3	1.8	5.8
Maddy Westbeld	26	1	13.6	36.2%	39.5%	87.5%	2.4	0.9	0.5	0.3	0.6	1.6	4.1
Hailey Van Lith	29	0	12.4	33.9%	16.1%	74.2%	1.1	1.6	0.4	0.1	1.2	0.8	3.5
Marquesha Davis	2	0	10.5	16.7%	0.0%	—	1.0	—	—	0.5	1.5	0.5	1.0
Moriah Jefferson	5	1	7.0	37.5%	33.3%	—	1.0	1.8	—	—	0.4	0.6	1.4

== Awards and honors ==
Recipient	Award	Date awarded	Ref.
Angel Reese	Eastern Conference Player of the Week	July 1	
Angel Reese	WNBA All-Star Reserve	July 7	
Angel Reese	Peak Performer: Rebounds	September 12, 2025	
