= Disappearance of Erica Baker =

Child who disappeared in Ohio, 1999

Erica Baker
- Born: Erica Nicole Baker; June 22, 1989
- Disappeared: February 7, 1999 (aged 9); Kettering, Ohio, U.S.
- Status: Missing for 27 years, 3 months and 15 days
- Parent(s): Misty Baker (mother); Greg Baker (father)

Erica Nicole Baker (June 22, 1989 – disappeared February 7, 1999) is an American girl who disappeared from her hometown of Kettering, Ohio, while walking her dog.

== Background ==
Erica Baker was born in Kettering, Ohio, a suburb of Dayton, on June 22, 1989. She was 3 feet 11 inches tall, weighing 65 pounds, with blonde hair, hazel eyes, crooked front teeth, a tan-colored birthmark on her hip, and a scar on the inner arch of one foot. She was last seen at around 4:00 p.m. sitting on a bench near a pond in Indian Riffle Park, adjacent to the Kettering Recreation Complex, wearing a pink rain jacket, a pink Winnie the Pooh sweatshirt, blue jeans, and white tennis shoes.

The day she went missing, Erica was supposedly upset with her father, Greg Baker, because he had forgotten to purchase tickets for a father-daughter dance that she was looking forward to.

== Disappearance ==
On February 7, 1999, Erica's father dropped her off at her mother, Misty Baker's, house at approximately 3:00pm. Around 3:30pm, Erica had asked her grandmother, Pam Schmidt, if she could take her Shih Tzu out for a walk. At first, she was uncertain, but eventually let her go. A long time had passed and she hadn't returned. At around 4:30pm, her dog was found alone dragging its leash, but Erica was nowhere to be found, and she has not been seen or heard from since. Her fate and whereabouts remain unknown.

Several large, extensive searches for Erica had been carried out by the Kettering Police Department, assisted by the FBI, Ohio State Highway Patrol, and local volunteers in the surrounding areas; ground-penetrating radar technology was used in nearby wooded areas and a pond near her elementary school was drained, but all of these efforts were fruitless.

== Investigation ==
Authorities first focused on Misty and Greg; they were both given polygraph tests, which they passed.

=== Prime suspect ===
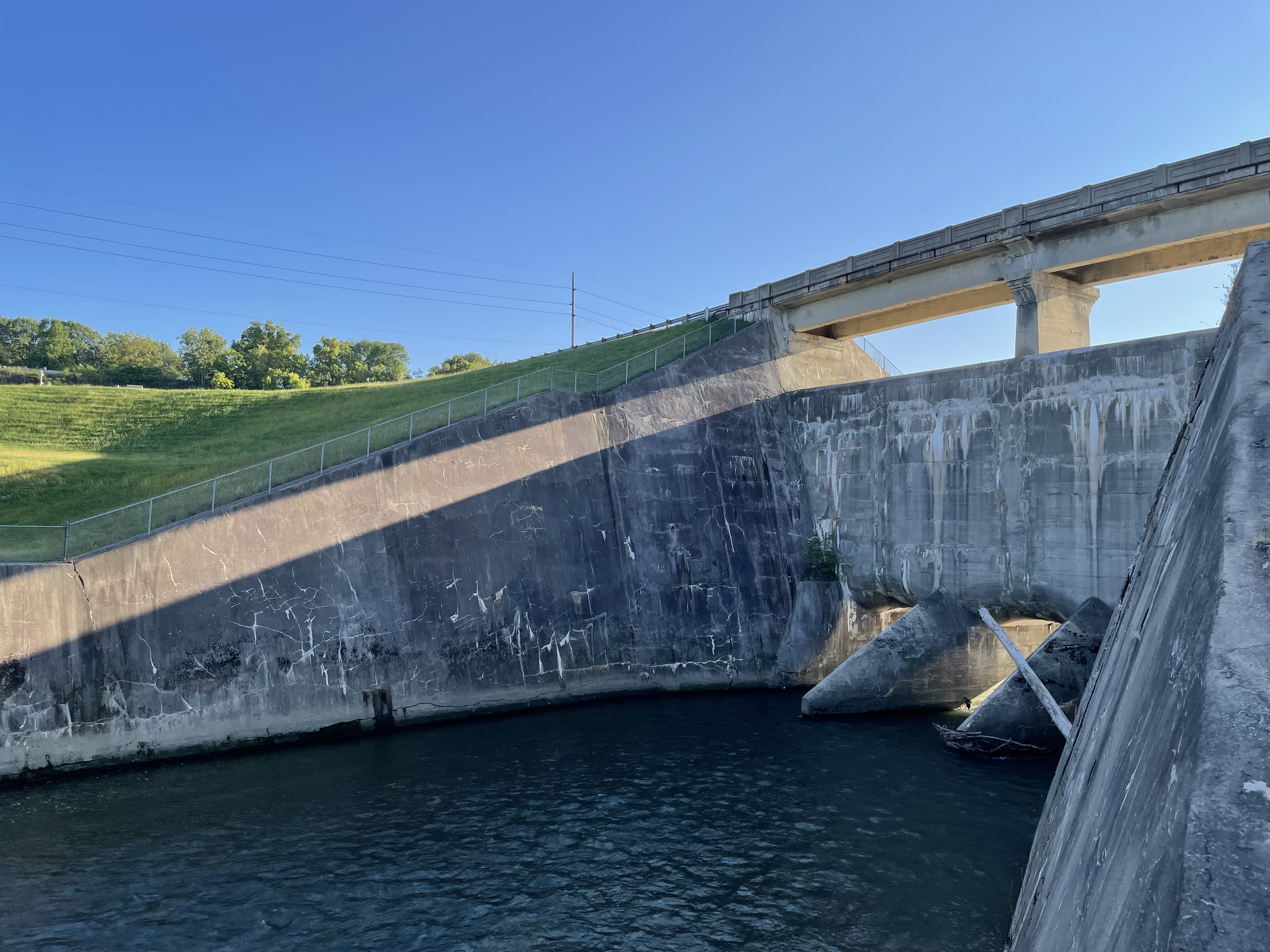
Huffman Dam, where Christian Gabriel claims to have buried Erica's body, pictured in 2022

Suspicion eventually fell on 29-year-old Christian John Gabriel, who was reported to have been driving a van around the area and time that Erica went missing. He reportedly had two accomplices with him: his girlfriend Jan Marie Franks, and his friend Clifford Butts. In 2004, Gabriel confessed to hitting Erica with his van near the intersection of Glengarry Drive and Powhattan Place. He reportedly heard a thud while driving, saw a dog run away, and then observed the dead body of a young girl lying on the road. He then subsequently drove off with the body and buried it somewhere "in a shallow grave", with help from his passengers. He claimed that they had all been under the influence of drugs at the time.

Gabriel led authorities to the location where he claims to have struck Erica, and later to Huffman Dam, where he claims to have buried her body. However, the following search efforts yielded no results. In 2005, Gabriel went to prison on charges of gross abuse of a corpse and tampering with evidence. He was released in 2011, at which point he relocated. Gabriel insists that he cannot remember the exact location where he buried Erica's body.

Over the course of his interrogation, Gabriel has provided multiple conflicting accounts; he had initially claimed that both Franks and Butts were with him when he hit Erica, but later stated that only Franks had been present, and eventually that she, Butts, and Butts' girlfriend were all present as well. He also at one point claimed that he was the driver, but later contradicted that statement by claiming that he was in the passenger seat. Additionally, despite initially claiming that he had buried Erica's body at Huffman Dam, he had later stated that he buried her at other locations, including Eastwood Lake and Caesar Creek State Park. Police have also searched these locations, but didn't find any trace of Erica's remains.

Gabriel was arrested in Roseburg, Oregon, in October 2023 for unrelated assault and drug charges, but this did not yield new evidence in Erica’s case.

Authorities also maintained focus on Jan Franks, who was mostly uncooperative and refused to speak with them. Police had suspected that Franks may have secretly confided details about her knowledge of and involvement in Erica's disappearance in her attorney, Federal Public Defender Beth Lewis. After Franks died of a drug overdose in 2001, the state requested that the attorney-client privilege be waived, and Lewis was called before a grand jury, but she repeatedly refused to testify. She was then found in contempt of court and ordered to be sent to prison, but she filed a notice of appeal and was granted a stay of execution.

About three years later in January 2006, Lewis testified before the secret Grand Jury.

== Subsequent developments ==
In 2014, the National Center for Missing and Exploited Children commissioned an age-progressed photo of Baker, showing what she may have looked like at 24 years old.

Detective Amy Pedro, leader of the Kettering Police Department as of 2024, is currently in charge of the case of Erica Baker's disappearance. Retired Detective Bob Green also remains involved. In 2022, a new search was conducted in a park based on a tip from the 2021 “Missing Erica Baker” podcast, produced by Dayton 24/7 Now. In January and May 2025, Texas EquuSearch Midwest, a volunteer search organization, conducted searches near Huffman Dam following additional tips, but no remains were found.
