= Modern College of Design =

For-profit school in Kettering, Ohio

Coordinates: 39°40′53″N 84°08′03″W

The Modern College of Design
- Former name: The School of Advertising Art
- Type: private, for-profit art school
- Active: 1983–2026
- Founder: Tim Potter
- Accreditation: ACCSC
- Location: Kettering, Ohio, United States
- Website: themodern.edu

The Modern College of Design was a private, for-profit art school in Kettering, Ohio, focused on graphic design. Founded in 1983 by advertising artist Tim Potter, the college trained creative individuals to become professional graphic designers and web designers through an Associate degree and a bachelor's degree completion program. The school offered one major track, which is a degree in Commercial & Advertising Art.

On May 4, 2026, the college's president announced that The Modern College of Design would be closing after the spring 2026 semester with all instruction ending on June 2 and permanent closure on June 23.

== Rankings ==
In 2022, the school had a 99.1% acceptance rate, 178 students enrolled, and a graduation rate of 54.2%. The school was relatively expensive compared to other special-focus institutions, costing approximately $15,000 more than the national average.
