= Town and Country Shopping Center (Kettering) =

- Location: Kettering, Ohio
- Coordinates: 39°41′18″N 84°09′57″W
- Opened: 1951
- Num. of stores: 33
- Num. of anchor tenants: 4
- Floor area: 250,676 sq ft (23,288.6 m^{2}); 226,981 sq ft (21,087.2 m^{2}) leaseable
- Floors: 1
- Public transit: RTA
- Website: http://www.daytontownandcountry.com/

Town and Country Shopping Center is a shopping center located in Kettering, Ohio, United States. It opened in 1951 and features both enclosed and open-air walkways that connect a series of adjacent stores and restaurants.

== History ==
Town and Country Shopping Center was considered a modern-style, suburban shopping center when it first opened in 1951. The Dayton area J.C. Penney moved from its downtown Dayton location to the shopping complex in 1956. According to the Ohio History Connection, it was one of the first of its kind to feature illuminated signage and parking areas to allow patrons to shop at night.

Stein Mart opened as an anchor tenant in 1992.

In late 2014, Town and Country owners announced that anchor stores were either relocating or expanding to make way for a major renovation with an estimated cost of $7 million. It was also revealed that TJ Maxx would be adding a location to the retail center. Other changes included enhancements to the interior, exterior, and parking lot. Anchor store Trader Joe's, the only location in the Dayton area, received a 25-percent expansion as part of the renovation. A new pedestrian breezeway was also constructed to connect smaller shops behind the shopping center.

Stein Mart filed for bankruptcy on August 12, 2020, and plans to go out of business by the end of the year. The company announced that it would close the Town and Country store when that location runs out of inventory. Stein Mart's lease with Town and Country expires in 2023, but the space is expected to be made available to shopping center management once released by the bankruptcy court.

== Description ==
Town and Country Shopping Center has 74 spaces for shops and restaurants and is anchored by Stein Mart (34,000 sq ft; 3,200 m^{2}); 2nd & Charles (22,246 sq ft; 2,066.7 m^{2}); TJ Maxx (22,100 sq ft; 2,050 m^{2}); Tuesday Morning (13,936 sq ft; 1,294.7 m^{2}); Petco (13,700 sq ft; 1,270 m^{2}); Trader Joe's (12,223 sq ft; 1,135.6 m^{2}); Roderer Shoe Center, the largest shoe store in Ohio (11,036 sq ft; 1,025.3 m^{2}); and Buffalo Wild Wings (8,775 sq ft; 815.2 m^{2}). The shopping center has an enclosed portion containing 55 spaces and has an attached open-air section called the Village Shops which contain 23 shops and restaurants.
