= Maddy Westbeld =

American basketball player (born 2002)

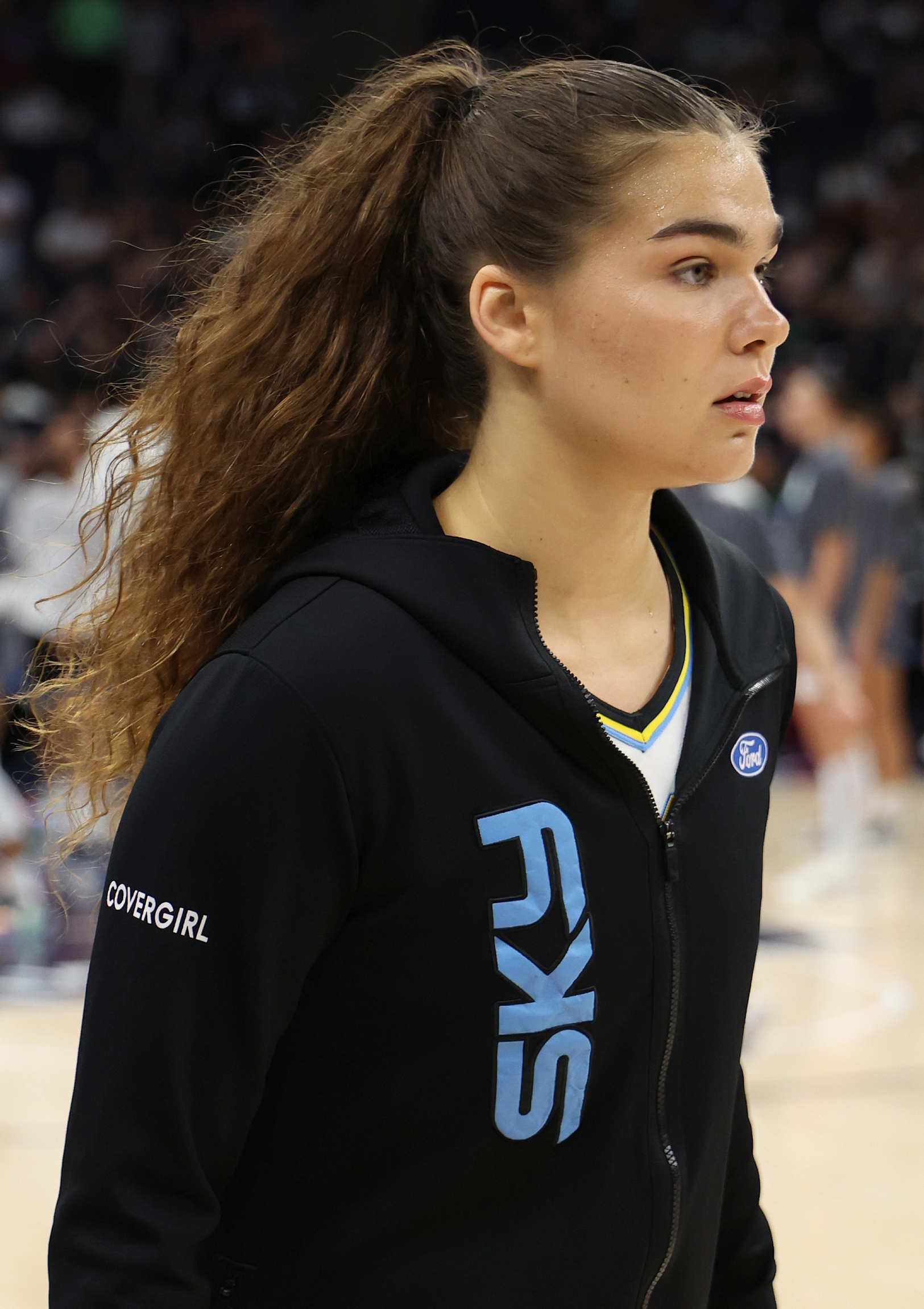
- Westbeld with the Chicago Sky in 2025

No. 21 – Phoenix Mercury
- Position: Power forward
- League: WNBA

Personal information
- Born: February 10, 2002 (age 24) Kettering, Ohio, U.S.
- Listed height: 6 ft 3 in (1.91 m)

Career information
- High school: Fairmont (Kettering, Ohio)
- College: Notre Dame (2020–2025)
- WNBA draft: 2025: 2nd round, 16th overall pick
- Drafted by: Chicago Sky

Career history
- 2025–2026: Chicago Sky
- 2026–present: Phoenix Mercury
- 2026–present: Adelaide Lightning

Career highlights
- First Team All-ACC (2021); All-ACC Second Team (2023, 2024); First Team All-ACC Tournament (2024); ACC Rookie of the Year (Head Coaches) (2021); ACC All-Freshman Team (2021); ACC All-Academic Team (2021); McDonald's All-American (2020)
- Stats at Basketball Reference

Madeline Grace Westbeld (born February 10, 2002) is an American professional basketball player for the Phoenix Mercury of the Women's National Basketball Association (WNBA). She played college basketball at Notre Dame. She played for Fairmont High School in Kettering, Ohio where she classified as a five-star recruit by ESPN. She was selected 16th overall by the Chicago Sky in the 2025 WNBA draft.

== Early life and high school career ==
Westbeld played for the Fairmont High School (Ohio) in Kettering, Ohio, she led the Firebirds to a 25–3 record and regional finals appearance in the OHSAA Girls Basketball State Championships in her senior year. As a junior Westbeld averaged 15.9 points and 10.4 rebounds, ultimately leading her team in scoring, rebounds, assists, assist/turnover ratio, blocks and free-throw percentage. In her senior year in high school, Westbeld led her team in scoring (18.0) rebounds (11.2), assists (3.6), steals (2.8) and blocked shots (2.3).

Westbeld was declared Gatorade Ohio Girls Basketball Player of the Year in 2020, becoming the first player from Fairmont to do so. Westbeld was also selected as the 2020 OPSWA Division I Player of the Year and was a First Team All-Ohio selection (Junior & Senior year). She was also selected for both the McDonald's All-American Game and Jordan Brand Classic.

=== Recruitment ===
Westbeld was considered a five-star recruit ranked No. 23 in her class and 5th at her position. In October 2019, Westbeld committed to play college basketball for the Notre Dame Fighting Irish over offers from UCLA Bruins, Louisville Cardinals, Ohio State Buckeyes and Tennessee Lady Volunteers.

== College career ==
In her freshman year, Westbeld started all 20 games for the Irish averaging 15.2 points and 7.9 rebounds. She led all ACC rookies and ranked 10th overall in the league earning ACC Rookie of the Week honors twice. Westbeld was selected in the First Team All-ACC and ACC All-Freshman Team as well as named as the ACC Rookie of the Year. In her sophomore season, Westbeld started all 33 games averaging 11.8 points and 6.3 rebounds. In her junior year, Westbeld started all 33 of Notre Dame's games, averaging 27.5 minutes, 11.2 points, 6.6 rebounds and 2.3 assists per game. In March 2023, Westbeld became the 42nd player to reach the 1000 career-points in an Irish uniform. Westbeld was selected in the All-ACC Second Team in her Junior year.

In her senior year Westbeld started all 34 games, averaging a near double-double with 14.4 ppg and 8.7 rpg. In the ACC Tournament, Westbeld averaged 15.7 points, 6 rebounds and 2.3 assists per game and was named to the All-ACC Tournament First Team. Westbeld helped the Irish win their 1st ACC Tournament title under head coach Niele Ivey. She was also named in the All-ACC Second Team.

In April 2024, Westbeld announced she will use her remaining college eligibility to return to the Irish for a fifth and final season in 2024–25.

== Professional career ==
=== Chicago Sky (2025-present) ===
On April 14, 2025, Westbeld was selected 16th overall by the Chicago Sky in the 2025 WNBA draft. She made her debut on May 17, playing 4 minutes off the bench in a 58–93 loss to the Indiana Fever, but saw little action during the first two months of the season, and her role increased only during Angel Reese's absences. On September 5, in a 77–97 loss to the Fever, she made her first career start, recording 7 points and 4 rebounds in 15 minutes of play. On September 11, in the season finale, an 86–91 loss to the New York Liberty, she scored a career-high 25 points. Overall, in her rookie season, she appeared in 26 games, averaging 4.1 points and 2.4 rebounds in 13.6 minutes per game.

On May 4, 2026, Westbeld was waived by the Sky. On May 7, 2026 she signed a development contract with the Sky for the rest of the season.

=== Phoenix Mercury (2026-present) ===
On August 18, 2026, Westbeld signed a rest-of-season contract with the Phoenix Mercury.

=== Adelaide Lightning (2026-present) ===
In July 2026, Westbeld signed with the Adelaide Lightning of the Women's National Basketball League (WNBL).

== National team career ==
Westbeld participated in the trials for the USA U17 World Cup team in 2018. Westbeld was also named as a finalist for the 2021 USA Basketball U19 World Cup team. Westbeld was a member of the 2022 USA Basketball 3x3 U23 Nations League Team, which competed at the FIBA 3x3 Nations League Americas conference in Santo Domingo, Dominican Republic as well as a member of the USA U24 roster for the 2023 FIBA 3x3 Women's Series.

== Career statistics ==
Legend
| GP | Games played | GS | Games started | MPG | Minutes per game | RPG | Rebounds per game |
| APG | Assists per game | SPG | Steals per game | BPG | Blocks per game | PPG | Points per game |
| TO | Turnovers per game | FG% | Field-goal percentage | 3P% | 3-point field-goal percentage | FT% | Free-throw percentage |
| **Bold** | Career best | ° | League leader |

=== WNBA ===
==== Regular season ====
Stats current through end of 2025 regular season

WNBA regular season statistics
| Year | Team | GP | GS | MPG | FG% | 3P% | FT% | RPG | APG | SPG | BPG | TO | PPG |
|---|---|---|---|---|---|---|---|---|---|---|---|---|---|
| 2025 | Chicago | 26 | 1 | 13.6 | .362 | .395 | .875 | 2.4 | 0.9 | 0.5 | 0.3 | 0.6 | 4.1 |
| **Career** | 1 year, 1 team | 26 | 1 | 13.6 | .362 | .395 | .875 | 2.4 | 0.9 | 0.5 | 0.3 | 0.6 | 4.1 |

=== College ===
| Year | Team | GP | GS | MPG | FG% | 3P% | FT% | RPG | APG | SPG | BPG | TO | PPG |
|---|---|---|---|---|---|---|---|---|---|---|---|---|---|
| 2020–21 | Notre Dame | 20 | 20 | 31.9 | 46.9 | **38.8** | **78.6** | 7.9 | **2.5** | 1.4 | 0.9 | 3.4 | **15.2** |
| 2021–22 | Notre Dame | 33 | 33 | 28.9 | **48.2** | 32.9 | 72.7 | 6.3 | 1.4 | 1.2 | 0.9 | 1.8 | 11.8 |
| 2022–23 | Notre Dame | 33 | 33 | 27.5 | 44.9 | 34.4 | 61.7 | 6.6 | 2.3 | 1.4 | **1.2** | 2.2 | 11.2 |
| 2023–24 | Notre Dame | **34** | **34** | **33.2** | 45.8 | 36.8 | 78.4 | **8.7** | 1.7 | **1.5** | 1.1 | 2.1 | 14.4 |
| 2024–25 | Notre Dame | 21 | 18 | 22.6 | 47.2 | 30.8 | 76.9 | 2.8 | 0.9 | 1.0 | 1.0 | **1.0** | 7.6 |
| **Career** | | 141 | 138 | 29.1 | 46.5 | 34.9 | 73.5 | 6.7 | 1.8 | 1.3 | 1.0 | 2.1 | 12.1 |
Statistics retrieved from Sports-Reference.

== Personal life ==
Westbeld's older sister, Kathryn, also played for the Irish. Westbeld and her sister are the only sisters to ever reach 1,000 points in a Notre Dame uniform.

In June 2025, Westbeld's relationship with former Notre Dame teammate and WNBA No. 2 overall draft pick, Olivia Miles, became public. The couple have a cat named Beans. As of July 2026, they are no longer together.
