= Fairmont High School (Ohio) =

Kettering Fairmont High School

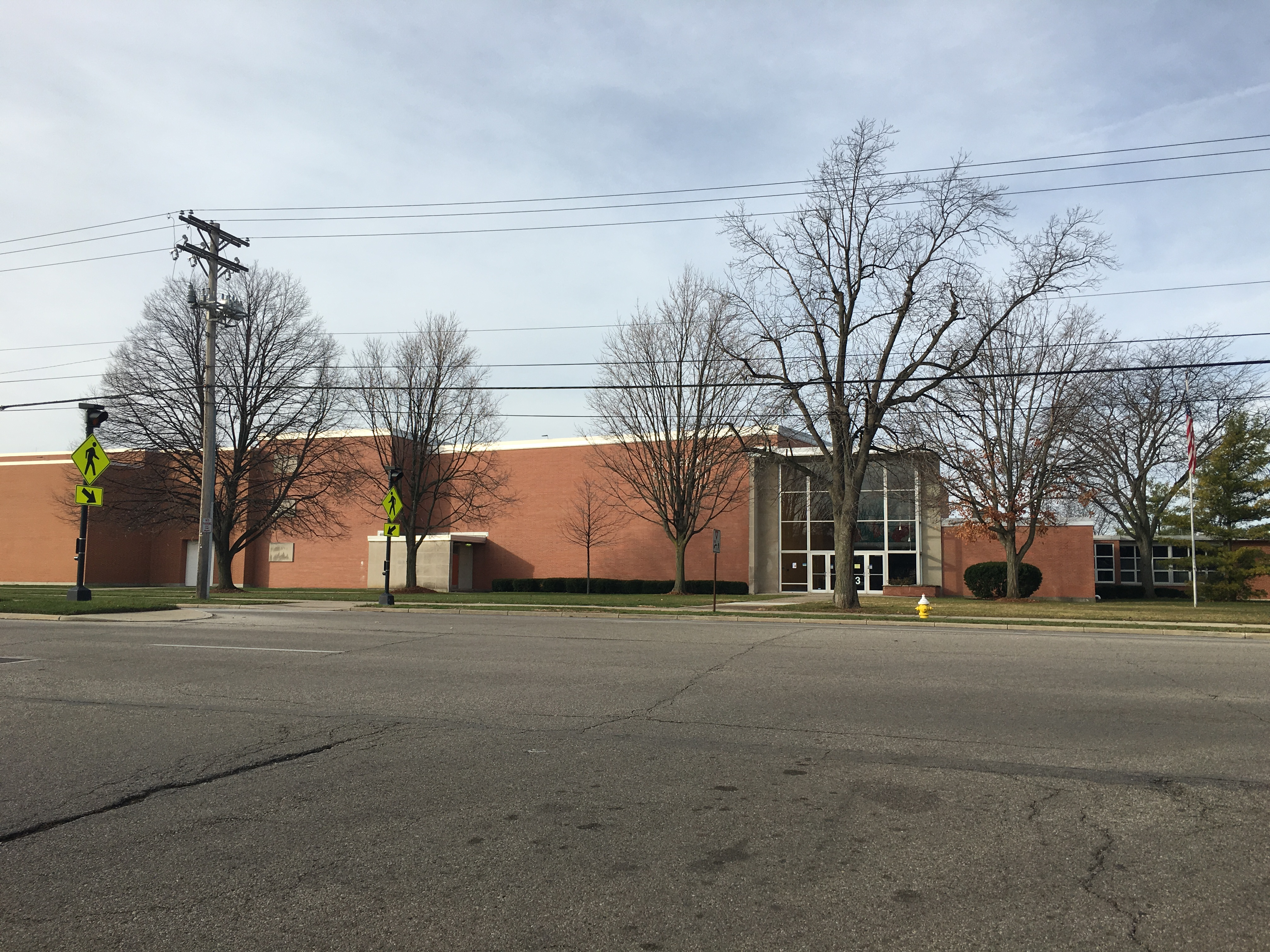

Location
- 3301 Shroyer Road; Kettering, Ohio 45429; United States; 39°41′37″N 84°10′05″W

Information
- Type: Public High School
- School district: Kettering City School District
- Superintendent: Mindy McCarty-Stewart
- Principal: Karyn Denslow
- Staff: 136.58 (FTE)
- Enrollment: 2,525 (2023-2024)
- Student to teacher ratio: 18.49
- Colors: Navy blue Silver; White
- Nickname: Firebirds
- Website: School website
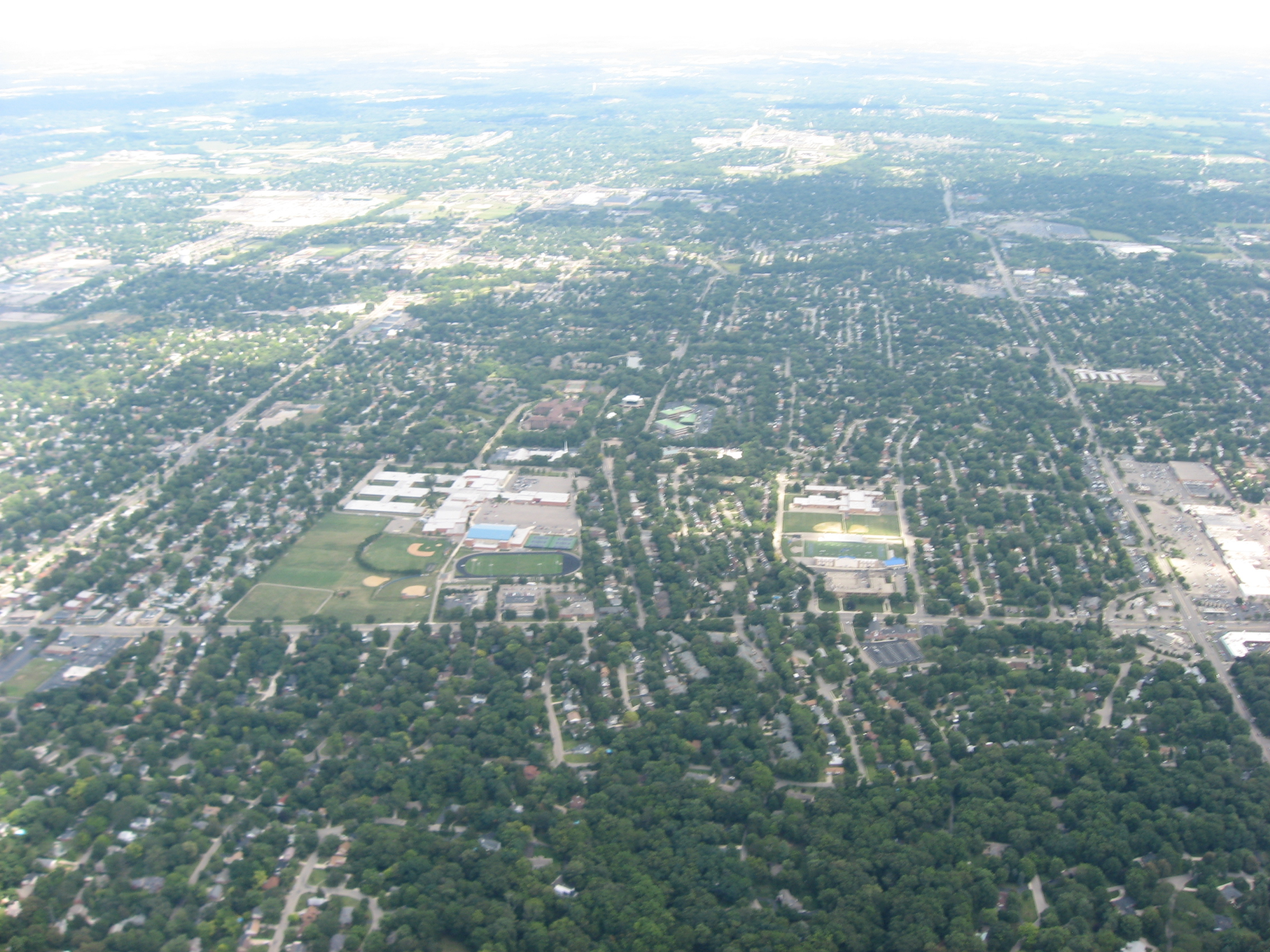
- Aerial view of Kettering Fairmont

Kettering Fairmont High School is located in Kettering, Ohio, United States. It is home to about 2,500 students, making it the sixth largest high school in Ohio.

== History ==
The original school was part of the Van Buren Township Schools and was opened in September 1906. The high school was located on Dorothy Lane just west of Far Hills Avenue. In 1922, the original four-room school was too small for the student population and was replaced by a larger building east of the original building on Dorothy Lane. The original four-room school house later became the first Kettering City Hall.

As Van Buren Township began to rapidly grow as a desirable Dayton, Ohio suburban location, the new school on Dorothy Lane was quickly filled to capacity. In 1929, a new, modern building was built on Far Hills Avenue at the corner of Storms Road. The 1922 building became Dorothy Lane Elementary School. The cost of the new high school on Far Hills was $300,000 and led to its being called the "folly in the country." But it had to be expanded several times to keep pace with growing enrollment. The school mascot and colors were Dragons and purple and white.

In 1934, Fairmont Stadium was constructed behind the school as a football and track and field venue for the school team. As interest in Fairmont football grew, a donation from the Foreman family, which had four sons who had been Dragon stars, helped remodel and enlarge the facilities.

In 1954, the Village of Kettering, which occupied much of Van Buren Township, became the City of Kettering, one of the fastest growing in the area. The high school on Far Hills could no longer be expanded to house the growing student population. The Kettering Board of Education secured a large tract of land between Far Hills Avenue and Shroyer Road. A seven building campus style high school, the first of its kind in the Midwest, was opened in 1957 as a three-year high-school. The former building became Dwight L. Barnes Junior High School. Today, it is the home of the Kettering Board of Education.

Within just a few years, the student enrollment of more than 2,000 was again exceeding the capacity of the new high school. By 1963, a second campus style high school located in the eastern part of the city was opened as Fairmont East High School and the existing school was renamed Fairmont West High School. Fairmont West retained the Dragons mascot and colors, while Fairmont East adopted the Falcons mascot and the colors Columbia blue and red.

In the 1970s, the vocational facilities at Fairmont West were expanded as the Kettering Fairmont Career Tech Center. But overall enrollment began to decline in the school district. After 20 years, the Fairmont East campus was converted to a middle school.

In the fall of 1983, the consolidated school reopened as Kettering Fairmont High School, with students from both East and West joining as the Fairmont Firebirds, taking the flight of the Falcon and the fire of the Dragon. The new school colors are navy blue, silver and white.

In the 1990s, a track and field facility was constructed on vacant land on the campus between Far Hills and Shroyer. Fairmont participated in the Miami Valley League (MVL) and later in the Western Ohio League (WOL). They are now in the Greater Western Ohio Conference.

During the 1992/1993 school year, the high school underwent a major reconstruction, turning the seven building campus into one large building. The project added new classrooms, lockers, common areas, and allowed for students to avoid inclement weather between classes. The then 7 buildings were connected with 35 new classrooms and expansion of facilities such as the library/media center, cafeteria and gymnasium. For the first time since the 1940s, the high school was again a four-year high school, from September 1993.

In October 2005, the new $8.8 million 63,000-square-foot (5,900 m^{2}) James S. Trent Gymnasium—named for the veteran Kettering educator—opened. It seats 3,400 (4,400 with folding seats on the floor) and is used not only for the school's indoor sports teams, but for traveling sports tournaments and music acts. The arena ranks as the seventh-largest entertainment venue in Dayton. It rivals Fraze Pavilion, the outdoor amphitheater in Kettering, which has 4,388 seats. The arena's first scheduling priorities are for the high school. Because residents approved a levy to pay for renovations and additions to almost every building in the school district, the arena also has community aspects such as:

- An 8,000-square-foot (740 m^{2}) exercise facility, The Kettering Fitness and Wellness Center
- A wellness/physical therapy center operated by Kettering Medical Center
- A cafe
- A reception and banquet facility

For high academic achievements, Fairmont awarded Dragon Bells. A bell tower was built on the campus in 1989 as a gift of the Class of 1989 and named the Kettering Firebird Spirit Bell. The bell is electronically operated and is the last operational bell from the original Deeds Carillon, which was upgraded to 57 bells in 1988. The bells have recently been refurbished are rung for high academic and extracurricular achievement.

== Athletics ==
Football and Field Hockey is played at Roush Stadium. Basketball, varsity baseball, softball, soccer, tennis, track and field, volleyball, and wrestling are held at James S. Trent Arena.

=== State Championships ===
- Boys bowling — 2021
- Boys soccer — 2026
- Girls field hockey — 1983, 1985, 1989, 1990
- Girls basketball — 2013, 2026

== Notable alumni ==
- Neutron Man (1960), Ohio State University superfan
- Gary Sandy (1964), actor
- Deem Bristow (1960s), actor
- Chet Moeller (1972), former college football player
- Nancy Cartwright (1976), voice actress.
- Brady Hoke (1977), former college football coach at the University of Michigan
- Jeff Young (1980), former guitar player for Megadeth
- Ted Rall (1981), cartoonist, author
- Rob Dyrdek (1992), professional skateboarder
- Sherri Saum (1993), actress
- Chris Rolfe (2001), professional soccer player in the Major League Soccer
- Lamar Skeeter (2007), professional basketball coach
- Kathryn Westbeld (2014), professional basketball player in the Women's National Basketball Association (WNBA)
- Maddy Westbeld (2020), professional basketball player in the Women's National Basketball Association (WNBA)
