= Cashmere High School (Washington) =

Coordinates: 47.5130°N 120.4792°W

Location
- 329 Tigner Road; Cashmere, Washington 98815

Information
- Type: Public
- Established: 1000
- School district: Cashmere School District
- Principal: Craig MacKenzie
- Teaching staff: 29.06 (FTE)
- Grades: 9–12
- Enrollment: 543 (2024-2025)
- Student to teacher ratio: 18.69
- Colors: Orange and black
- Athletics: Cross-Country, Football, Volleyball, Girls Soccer, Track and Field, Wrestling, Boys Soccer, Softball, Girls Swim, Boys Swim, Tennis, Girls Basketball, Boys Basketball, Cheer
- Athletics conference: 1A
- Mascot: Bulldog
- Rivals: Cascade Kodiaks, Chelan Goats
- Website: www.cashmere.wednet.edu/cashmerehs

Cashmere High School is a public high school located in Cashmere, Washington.

== Athletics ==
=== Teams ===
Cashmere's athletic teams are nicknamed The Bulldogs and Cashmere teams compete in the following sports:

- Cross Country
- Football
- Volleyball
- Girls' Soccer
- Boys' Soccer
- Girls' Swimming
- Boys' Swimming
- Girls' Basketball
- Boys' Basketball
- Wrestling
- Softball
- Baseball
- Tennis
- Track and Field

== Demographics ==
63% of the student population at Cashmere identify as Caucasian, 33% identify as Hispanic, 2% identify as multiracial, 1% identify as African American, 1% identify as Asian, and 1% identify as American Indian or Alaskan Native. The student body makeup is 49% male and 51% female.

== Notable alumni ==
- Hailey Van Lith (2020), college basketball player, Olympic bronze medalist
