= Kettering, Ohio =

City in Montgomery County, Ohio, US

- City
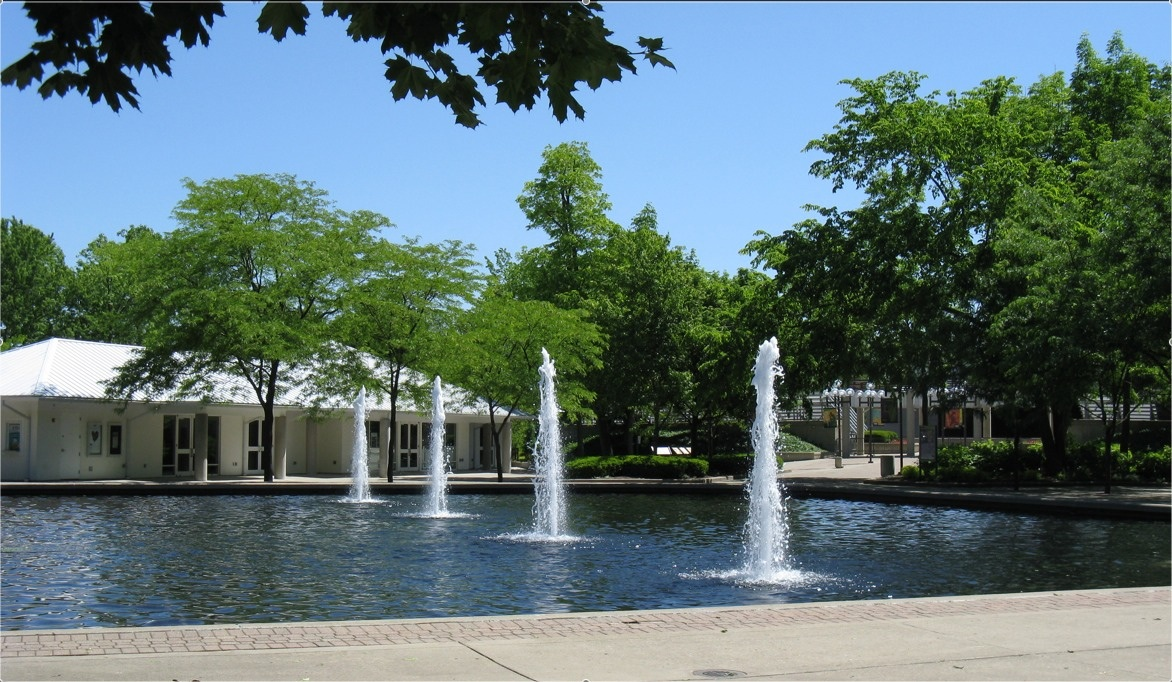
- Fraze Pavilion

- Flag Seal
- Motto: "Live Work Play"
- Interactive map of Kettering, Ohio
- Location within Ohio Location within the United States
- Coordinates: 39°41′47″N 84°07′55″W
- Country: United States
- State: Ohio
- Counties: Montgomery
- Established: 1955

Government
  - Mayor: Bryan Suddith

Area
  - Total: 18.75 sq mi (48.56 km^{2})
  - Land: 18.71 sq mi (48.47 km^{2})
  - Water: 0.035 sq mi (0.09 km^{2})
- Elevation: 1,007 ft (307 m)

Population (2020)
  - Total: 57,862
  - Density: 3,091.7/sq mi (1,193.73/km^{2})
- Time zone: UTC−5 (Eastern (EST))
  - Summer (DST): UTC−4 (EDT)
- ZIP codes: 45409, 45419, 45420, 45429, 45430, 45432, 45439, 45440, 45459
- Area codes: 937, 326
- FIPS code: 39-40040
- GNIS feature ID: 1086672
- Website: https://www.ketteringoh.org/

Kettering is a city in Montgomery County, Ohio, United States. It is an inner suburb of Dayton. The city had a population of 57,862 at the 2020 census, making it the most populous suburb in the Dayton metropolitan area.

== History ==
The area where the city of Kettering now lies was settled from the late 1700s to the mid-1800s, largely as farmland. The population in the area started to grow, prompting the creation of (now defunct) Van Buren Township in 1841. In November 1952, township voters approved incorporating as the Village of Kettering. (In 1953, the western portion of the village voted to secede, forming a new township, which is now the City of Moraine). By 1955, the village's population had grown to 38,118, which qualified it to claim city status, with the official proclamation by the state on June 24. The city is named for inventor Charles F. Kettering, who resided here in his home, Ridgeleigh Terrace, from 1914 until his death in 1958. Charles Kettering is known for his numerous inventions and contributions to Metro Dayton.

From the 1950s to the 1970s, Kettering's population continued to grow, adding more than 30,000 residents. This growth was due in part to the many people who started migrating out of nearby Dayton after World War II. Since the 1980s, Kettering has experienced a slow decline in population due to an aging population and loss of manufacturing jobs.

== Geography ==
According to the United States Census Bureau, the city has a total area of 16.42 square miles (42.53 km^{2}), of which 18.68 square miles (48.38 km^{2}) is land and 0.04 square miles (0.10 km^{2}) is water.

The city is bordered by Dayton, Riverside, and Oakwood to the north; West Carrollton and Moraine to the west; Miami Township to the southwest; Centerville and Washington Township to the south; and Beavercreek and Sugarcreek Township to the east.

== Demographics ==
Historical population
Census	Pop.	Note	%±
1960	54,462		—
1970	69,599		27.8%
1980	61,223		−12.0%
1990	60,569		−1.1%
2000	57,502		−5.1%
2010	56,163		−2.3%
2020	57,862		3.0%

=== 2020 census ===
As of the 2020 census, Kettering had a population of 57,862. The median age was 39.9 years. 20.9% of residents were under the age of 18 and 20.0% of residents were 65 years of age or older. For every 100 females there were 93.2 males, and for every 100 females age 18 and over there were 90.3 males age 18 and over.

100.0% of residents lived in urban areas, while 0.0% lived in rural areas.

There were 26,135 households in Kettering, of which 25.4% had children under the age of 18 living in them. Of all households, 41.3% were married-couple households, 20.8% were households with a male householder and no spouse or partner present, and 30.8% were households with a female householder and no spouse or partner present. About 36.1% of all households were made up of individuals and 15.0% had someone living alone who was 65 years of age or older.

There were 27,786 housing units, of which 5.9% were vacant. The homeowner vacancy rate was 1.2% and the rental vacancy rate was 6.9%.

Racial composition as of the 2020 census
Race	Number	Percent
White	48,871	84.5%
Black or African American	3,066	5.3%
American Indian and Alaska Native	105	0.2%
Asian	1,127	1.9%
Native Hawaiian and Other Pacific Islander	45	0.1%
Some other race	691	1.2%
Two or more races	3,957	6.8%
Hispanic or Latino (of any race)	1,965	3.4%

=== 2010 census ===
As of the census of 2010, there were 56,163 people, 25,427 households, and 14,979 families living in the city. The population density was 3,006.6 inhabitants per square mile (1,160.9/km^{2}). There were 27,602 housing units at an average density of 1,477.6 per square mile (570.5/km^{2}). The racial makeup of the city was 92.6% White, 3.3% African American, 0.2% Native American, 1.3% Asian, 0.5% from other races, and 2.1% from two or more races. Hispanic or Latino of any race were 2.1% of the population.

There were 25,427 households, of which 26.3% had children under the age of 18 living with them, 43.4% were married couples living together, 11.3% had a female householder with no husband present, 4.3% had a male householder with no wife present, and 41.1% were non-families. 34.9% of all households were made up of individuals, and 13.1% had someone living alone who was 65 years of age or older. The average household size was 2.19 and the average family size was 2.83.

The median age in the city was 40.9 years. 21% of residents were under the age of 18; 8.4% were between the ages of 18 and 24; 25.6% were from 25 to 44; 27% were from 45 to 64; and 18% were 65 years of age or older. The gender makeup of the city was 47.7% male and 52.3% female.

=== 2000 census ===
As of the census of 2000, there were 57,502 people, 25,657 households, and 15,727 families living in the city. The population density was 3,077.4 inhabitants per square mile (1,188.2/km^{2}). There were 26,936 housing units at an average density of 1,441.6 per square mile (556.6/km^{2}). The racial makeup of the city was 95.23% White, 1.66% African American, 0.18% Native American, 1.38% Asian, 0.02% Pacific Islander, 0.33% from other races, and 1.19% from two or more races. Hispanic or Latino of any race were 1.11% of the population.

There were 25,657 households, out of which 26.9% had children under the age of 18 living with them, 48.7% were married couples living together, 9.5% have a single female householder, and 38.7% were non-families. 33.4% of all households were made up of individuals, and 12.7% had someone living alone who was 65 years of age or older. The average household size was 2.22 and the average family size was 2.85.

In the city, the population was spread out, with 22.5% under the age of 18, 7.5% from 18 to 24, 29.4% from 25 to 44, 22.3% from 45 to 64, and 18.3% who were 65 years of age or older. The median age was 39 years. For every 100 females, there were 90.5 males. For every 100 females age 18 and over, there were 86.7 males.

The median income for a household in the city was $45,051, and the median income for a family was $55,849. Males had a median income of $41,558 versus $28,921 for females. The per capita income for the city was $27,009. About 3.2% of families and 4.6% of the population were below the poverty line, including 5.3% of those under age 18 and 3.6% of those age 65 or over.

== Parks and recreation ==
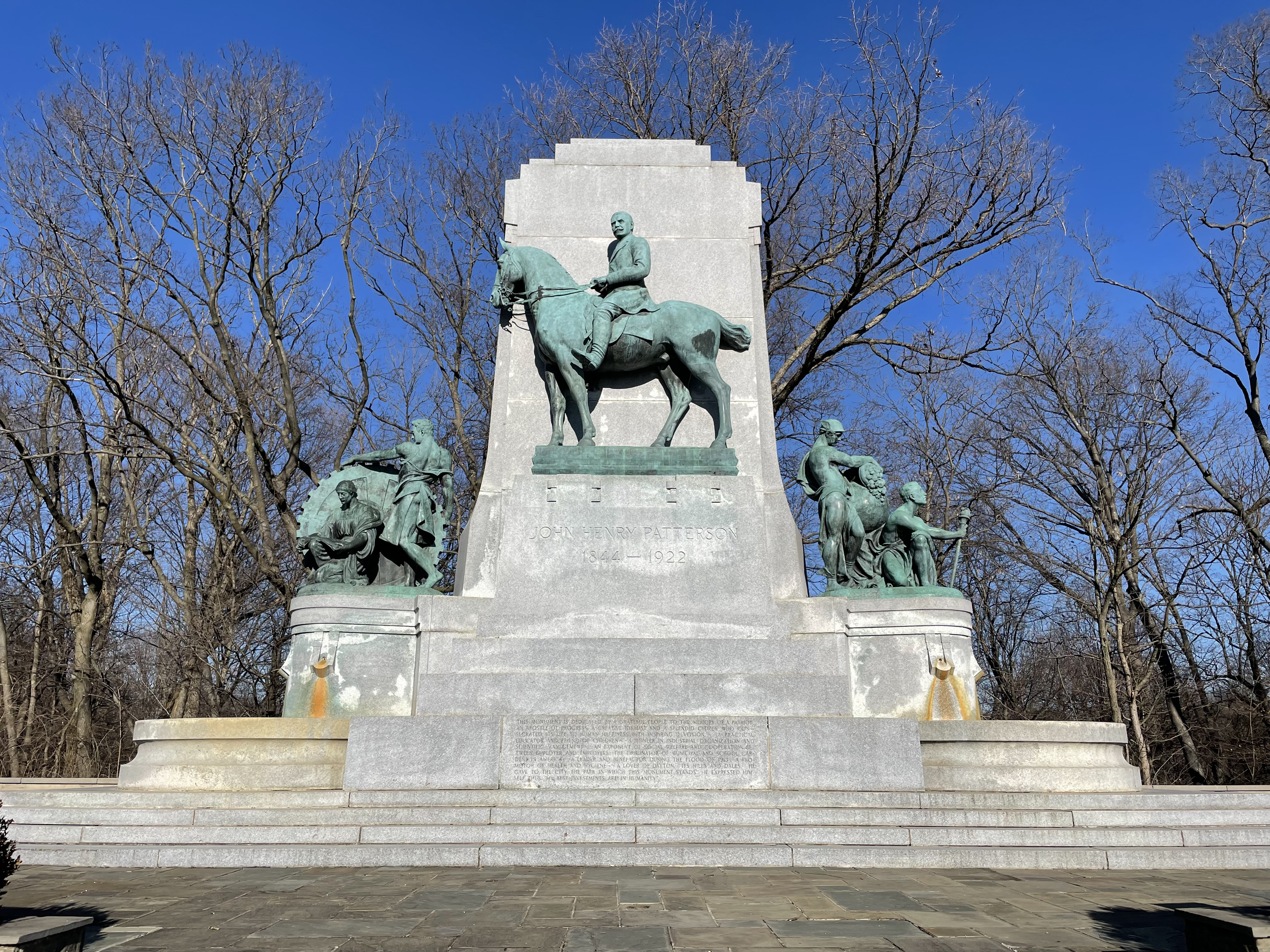
Patterson Memorial honoring John Henry Patterson in Hills and Dales MetroPark

Kettering has 20 parks totaling 284 acres (1.15 km^{2}) and is home to the Fraze Pavilion, a major outdoor entertainment venue that also hosts the summer concerts of the Dayton Philharmonic.

The James S. Trent Arena, which opened in 2005, has a seating capacity of 4,400 overall as well as 3,650 for championship sporting events, and it is located on the campus of Fairmont High School.

Skate Plaza, a 40,000-square-foot (3,700 m^{2}) skateboard park that opened in 2005, was a collaboration between the City of Kettering and Rob Dyrdek, a professional skateboarder who grew up in Kettering.

Rosewood Arts Center, formerly an elementary school, now hosts 100,000 visitors a year with art classes, exhibitions, an art gallery and the Art on the Commons festival.

The Town and Country Shopping Center is a small partly enclosed and part open-air mall located in the heart of Kettering near the intersection of Far Hills Ave. and Stroop Rd.

Pondview Park is a self-guided environmental park for people to experience nature. The park has trails, 6 ponds, a butterfly garden, and many scenic opportunities.

== Government ==
The city utilizes a council-manager form of government. Seven council representatives are elected for four-year terms on a non-partisan basis. They include the mayor, two at large members, and one member from each of the four wards. The current mayor is Bryan Suddith.

== Education ==
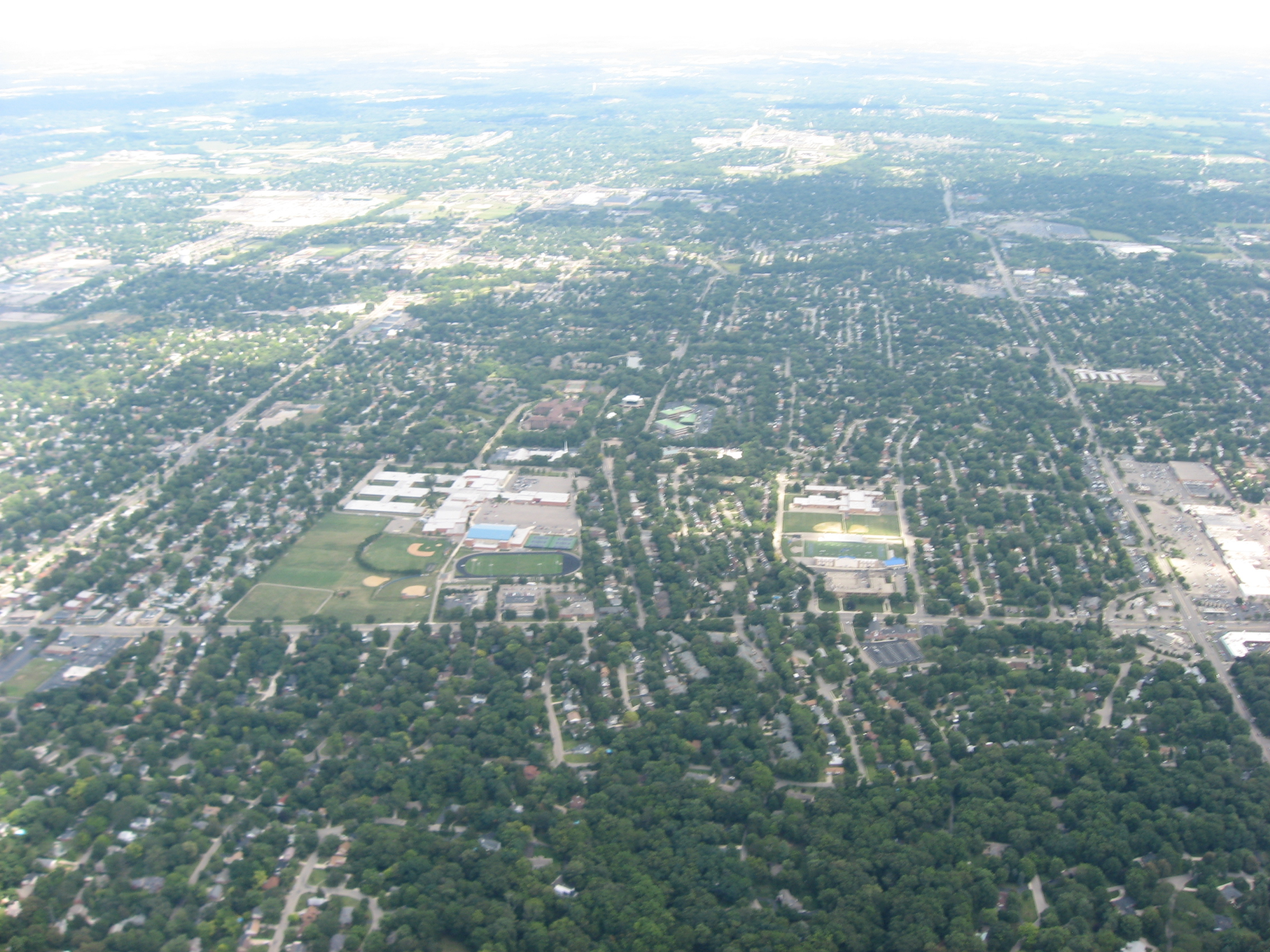
Aerial view centered on Kettering Fairmont High School

The Kettering City School District includes Kettering Fairmont High School, two middle schools (Van Buren and Kettering), eight elementary schools (Beavertown, Greenmont, Indian Riffle, J.E. Prass, John F. Kennedy, Oakview, Orchard Park, and Southdale), and one preschool (Kettering Early Childhood Education Center). Beginning with the 2026-27 school year, all middle school students will attend Kettering Fairmont Middle School (the renamed Kettering Middle School), and Van Buren Middle School will be demolished.

On the 2009–2010 Ohio report card, Kettering schools met all 26 state standards in testing, attendance and graduation rates earning the state's highest category, Excellent with Distinction.

Kettering is also home to several private schools—Alexandria Montessori School, Archbishop Alter High School, Ascension School, Emmanuel Christian Academy, St. Albert The Great School, and St. Charles Borromeo School.

Kettering College offers two-year and four-year degrees in several disciplines including Nursing, Sonography, Radiology Technology, Respiratory Therapy, and Human Biology; with a Master of Physician Assistant Studies (MPAS) and an Occupational Therapy Doctorate (OTD). The Modern College of Design offers two-year degrees in graphic design.

The international headquarters of the Driving Schools Association of the Americas (DSAA) is located in Kettering. The DSAA is one of the largest organizations in the world for the education of vehicle drivers and plays a significant educational role in improving road safety.

Kettering has two public libraries, both branches of the Dayton Metro Library.

== Infrastructure ==
The Greater Dayton Regional Transit Authority provides bus service in the city.

The Kettering Fire Department is responsible for fire protection in the city. The department has a total of four fire stations.

Police protection is provided by the Kettering Police Department which comprises 83 sworn officers. The police department is the only agency of its size with dual accreditation from both the Commission on Accreditation for Law Enforcement Agencies and the Commission on Accreditation for Corrections.

== Notable people ==
- Erica Baker, girl who went missing at 9 years old in 1999
- Richard Black, commercial artist and landscape painter, creator of the Mr. Clean mascot
- Chris Borland, NFL linebacker
- Tony Campana, MLB player
- Nancy Cartwright, voice actress, most notably of Bart Simpson on The Simpsons
- Andrew Chafin, MLB pitcher for the Cincinnati Reds
- Brooklyn Decker, Sports Illustrated model
- Rob Dyrdek, professional skateboarder, MTV personality
- A.J. Ewing, MLB player
- Tony P. Hall, member of the U.S. House of Representatives
- A. J. Hawk, NFL linebacker
- Brady Hoke, college football head coach
- Jeff Long, vice chancellor and director of athletics at the University of Arkansas
- Jim Paxson, NBA player and general manager of the Cleveland Cavaliers
- John Paxson, NBA player and executive vice president of basketball operations for the Chicago Bulls
- Nathan W. Pyle, cartoonist, Strange Planet
- Ted Rall, editorial cartoonist and columnist
- Chris Rolfe, MLS player
- Gary Sandy, actor, star of comedy series WKRP in Cincinnati
- Sherri Saum, Daytime Emmy-nominated actress
- Maddy Westbeld, WNBA basketball player for the Chicago Sky
- Malik Zaire, college Quarterback

== Sister cities ==
Kettering has two sister cities, as designated by Sister Cities International:

- – Kettering, Northamptonshire, England, United Kingdom
- – Steyr, Oberösterreich, Austria
