= Washington Catholic Athletic Conference =

High school athletic league in the US

The Washington Catholic Athletic Conference (WCAC) is a major high school athletic league for boys, girls, and co-ed Catholic high schools of the Archdiocese of Washington & Diocese of Arlington located in the Washington Metropolitan Area. The WCAC is widely regarded as the nation's best boys and girls basketball and football conference, with several teams in the conference ranked nationally in any given year.

== History ==
The Washington Catholic Athletic Conference was formed from the merger of two established Washington-area Catholic school athletic leagues. In November 1992, the all-boys Metro Conference and the Catholic Girls Athletic Association (CGAA) voted to merge and create a coeducational league beginning with the 1993–94 school year. Twelve schools were involved in the merger, and the new league was initially expected to be called the Mid-Atlantic Catholic Athletic Association.

By the fall of 1993, the league was operating as the Washington Catholic Athletic Conference. Contemporary coverage of a 1993 football game between DeMatha and St. John's described the WCAC as having a new name and alignment and noted that the schools' previous conference meetings had been played as members of the Metro Conference.

== Members ==
The conference includes Basketball, Football, Lacrosse, Track and Field, Wrestling, Soccer, Volleyball and Baseball programs.It has produced numerous professional athletes in the NFL, NBA, MLS, MLB and PLL.

School	Archdiocese- Diocese	Colors	Team name	Location	Founded	Enrollment
Archbishop Carroll High School	Archdiocese of Washington		Lions	Washington, DC	1951	400
Bishop Ireton High School	Diocese of Arlington		Cardinals	Alexandria, VA	1964	800
Bishop McNamara High School	Archdiocese of Washington		Mustangs	Forestville, MD	1964	870
Bishop O'Connell High School	Diocese of Arlington		Knights	Arlington, VA	1957	1,170
DeMatha Catholic High School	Archdiocese of Washington		Stags	Hyattsville, MD	1946	800
Elizabeth Seton High School	Archdiocese of Washington		Roadrunners	Bladensburg, MD	1959	570
Gonzaga College High School	Archdiocese of Washington		Eagles	Washington, DC	1821	970
Our Lady of Good Counsel High School	Archdiocese of Washington		Falcons	Olney, MD	1958	1,200
Academy of the Holy Cross	Archdiocese of Washington		Tartans	Kensington, MD	1868	530
St. Paul VI Catholic High School	Diocese of Arlington		Panthers	Chantilly, VA	1983	957
St. John's College High School	Archdiocese of Washington		Cadets	Washington, DC	1851	1,200
St. Mary's Ryken High School	Archdiocese of Washington		Knights	Leonardtown, MD	1885	700
The Heights School	Archdiocese of Washington		Cavaliers	Potomac, MD	1969	280

Holy Cross and Elizabeth Seton are girls only, while Gonzaga, DeMatha and the Heights are all boys.

== Sports ==
The WCAC sponsors competitions in the following sports:

- Baseball
- Basketball
- Cross Country
- Field Hockey
- Football
- Golf
- Ice Hockey
- Lacrosse
- Soccer
- Softball
- Swimming
- Tennis
- Track & Field
- Volleyball
- Wrestling

== Football ==
Football championship records associated with the Washington Catholic Athletic Conference extend through its predecessor conferences. The Metro Conference was organized in 1969 and became the primary boys' athletic conference for many of the Catholic schools that later formed the WCAC. In 1993, the Metro Conference was reorganized into the Washington Catholic Athletic Conference. DeMatha won the first football championship under the WCAC name that season after having won the final two Metro Conference championships in 1991 and 1992.

Beginning with the 2018 season, WCAC football was divided into the Capital and Metro divisions, with each division conducting its own postseason and awarding a championship. St. Mary's Ryken won the inaugural Metro Division championship, while Gonzaga won the inaugural Capital Division championship.

=== Champions ===
The championship history below includes championships recognized through the WCAC's predecessor football leagues as well as championships won after the WCAC name was adopted.

==== Pre-Metro era ====
- 1960 – Archbishop Carroll
- 1961 – St. John's
- 1962 – St. John's
- 1963 – DeMatha
- 1964 – St. John's
- 1965 – Archbishop Carroll
- 1966 – DeMatha
- 1967 – DeMatha
- 1968 – St. John's

==== Metro Conference era ====
- 1969 – Archbishop Carroll
- 1970 – Archbishop Carroll
- 1971 – Archbishop Carroll
- 1972 – St. John's
- 1973 – Bishop McNamara
- 1974 – St. John's
- 1975 – St. John's
- 1976 – St. John's
- 1977 – Archbishop Carroll
- 1978 – Archbishop Carroll
- 1979 – Archbishop Carroll
- 1980 – Archbishop Carroll
- 1981 – Bishop McNamara
- 1982 – DeMatha
- 1983 – Archbishop Carroll
- 1984 – DeMatha
- 1985 – Archbishop Carroll
- 1986 – DeMatha
- 1987 – Archbishop Carroll
- 1988 – Archbishop Carroll
- 1989 – St. John's
- 1990 – Bishop McNamara
- 1991 – DeMatha
- 1992 – DeMatha

The 1991 season marked the first Metro Conference football playoff tournament. DeMatha defeated St. John's, 7–0, in the championship game. In 1992, DeMatha defeated regular-season champion Carroll, 28–7, to win the final Metro Conference football championship before the creation of the WCAC.

==== WCAC era ====
- 1993 – DeMatha
- 1994 – DeMatha
- 1995 – DeMatha
- 1996 – Gonzaga
- 1997 – Gonzaga
- 1998 – DeMatha
- 1999 – Paul VI
- 2000 – DeMatha
- 2001 – DeMatha
- 2002 – Gonzaga
- 2003 – DeMatha
- 2004 – DeMatha
- 2005 – DeMatha
- 2006 – DeMatha
- 2007 – DeMatha
- 2008 – DeMatha
- 2009 – Good Counsel
- 2010 – Good Counsel
- 2011 – Good Counsel
- 2012 – Good Counsel
- 2013 – DeMatha
- 2014 – DeMatha
- 2015 – DeMatha
- 2016 – DeMatha
- 2017 – St. John's

When the WCAC was created, football initially operated with Division I and Division II classifications. Bishop Ireton won the 1993 Division II championship, Bishop O'Connell won the 1994 Division II championship, and Good Counsel won the 1995 Division II championship. For the 1996 season, the conference replaced the two-division football structure with one division and two separate postseason tournaments on a two-year trial basis.

==== Capital and Metro Division era ====
Beginning in 2018, the conference began awarding separate Capital and Metro Division championships.

Year	Capital Division champion	Metro Division champion
2018	Gonzaga	St. Mary's Ryken
2019	Good Counsel	St. Mary's Ryken
2020	No championship due to the COVID-19 pandemic	
2021	St. John's	St. Mary's Ryken
2022	St. John's	Archbishop Carroll
2023	Good Counsel	St. Mary's Ryken
2024	DeMatha	Paul VI
2025	DeMatha	St. Mary's Ryken

DeMatha's 2024 championship was its 25th conference football title and its first since 2016. The Stags repeated in 2025, defeating Gonzaga 20–13 to win their 26th championship. St. Mary's Ryken's 2025 Metro championship was its fifth Metro title in seven seasons.

=== Championships by school ===
The totals below count championships in the primary historical championship lineage through 2017 and both Capital and Metro Division championships beginning in 2018. The separate Division II championships awarded from 1993 through 1995 and other secondary postseason tournaments are not included in these totals.

School	Championships
DeMatha	26
Archbishop Carroll	14
St. John's	12
Good Counsel	6
St. Mary's Ryken	5
Gonzaga	4
Bishop McNamara	3
Paul VI	2

== Boys Basketball Champions ==
- 1961-DeMatha
- 1962-DeMatha
- 1963-DeMatha
- 1964-DeMatha
- 1965-DeMatha
- 1966-DeMatha
- 1967-Mackin (Carroll)
- 1968-DeMatha
- 1969-DeMatha
- 1970-DeMatha
- 1971-DeMatha
- 1972-DeMatha
- 1973-DeMatha
- 1974-DeMatha
- 1975-DeMatha
- 1976-DeMatha
- 1977-St. John's
- 1978-DeMatha
- 1979-DeMatha
- 1980-DeMatha
- 1981-DeMatha
- 1982-DeMatha
- 1983-DeMatha
- 1984-DeMatha
- 1985-DeMatha
- 1986-Gonzaga
- 1987-DeMatha
- 1988-DeMatha
- 1989-Carroll
- 1990-DeMatha
- 1991-DeMatha
- 1992-DeMatha
- 1993-Carroll
- 1994-DeMatha
- 1995-McNamara
- 1996-DeMatha
- 1997-Gonzaga
- 1998-DeMatha
- 1999-Gonzaga
- 2000-St. John's
- 2001-DeMatha
- 2002-DeMatha
- 2003-Gonzaga
- 2004-O'Connell
- 2005-DeMatha
- 2006-DeMatha
- 2007-DeMatha
- 2008-Gonzaga
- 2009-DeMatha
- 2010-DeMatha
- 2011-DeMatha
- 2012-St. Paul VI
- 2013-O'Connell
- 2014-St. Paul VI
- 2015-Gonzaga
- 2016-St. John's
- 2017-Gonzaga
- 2018-DeMatha
- 2019-Gonzaga
- 2020-DeMatha
- 2022-St. Paul VI
- 2023-St. John’s
- 2024-St. Paul VI
- 2025-St. Paul VI
- 2026-St. Paul IV

Champions
School	Championships
DeMatha	41
Gonzaga	8
St. John's	4
St. Paul VI	6
Carroll	3
O'Connell	2
McNamara	1

== Girls Basketball Champions ==
- 1994-O'Connell
- 1995-Good Counsel
- 1996-Elizabeth Seton
- 1997-Elizabeth Seton
- 1998-St. John's
- 1999-St. John's
- 2000-St. John's
- 2001-Elizabeth Seton
- 2002-St. John's
- 2003-McNamara
- 2004-St. John's
- 2005-Good Counsel
- 2006-Good Counsel
- 2007-Holy Cross
- 2008-McNamara
- 2009-Good Counsel
- 2010-Elizabeth Seton
- 2011-St. John's
- 2012-Good Counsel
- 2013-St. John's
- 2014-St. Paul VI
- 2015-St. Paul VI
- 2016-St. Paul VI
- 2017-St. John's
- 2018-St. John's
- 2019-St. John's
- 2020-McNamara
- 2022-St. John's
- 2023-St. John’s
- 2024-St. John's
- 2025-McNamara
- 2026-McNamara

Champions
School	Championships
St. John's	13
Good Counsel	5
Elizabeth Seton	4
St. Paul VI	3
Bishop McNamara	5
O'Connell	1
Holy Cross	1

== Girls Ice Hockey Champions ==
- 2019-St. John's
- 2020-St. John's
- 2022-St. John's
- 2023-St. John’s
- 2024-St. John's
- 2025-St. John's
- 2026-St. John's

Champions
School	Championships
St. John's	7

== Baseball ==
- 1968-DeMatha
- 1969-St. John's
- 1970-DeMatha
- 1971-St. John's
- 1972-Good Counsel
- 1973-Carroll
- 1974-Carroll
- 1975-DeMatha
- 1976-St. John's
- 1977-St. John's
- 1978-DeMatha
- 1979-DeMatha
- 1980-DeMatha
- 1981-DeMatha
- 1982-O'Connell
- 1983-DeMatha
- 1984-DeMatha
- 1985-DeMatha
- 1986-Good Counsel
- 1987-DeMatha
- 1988-DeMatha
- 1989-O'Connell
- 1990-Good Counsel
- 1991-DeMatha
- 1992-DeMatha
- 1993-St. Paul VI
- 1994-DeMatha
- 1995-DeMatha
- 1996-DeMatha
- 1997-DeMatha
- 1998-DeMatha
- 1999-St. John's
- 2000-Gonzaga
- 2001-O'Connell
- 2002-DeMatha
- 2003-DeMatha
- 2004-DeMatha
- 2005-St. John's
- 2006-Good Counsel
- 2007-St. Paul VI
- 2008-DeMatha
- 2009-St. Paul VI
- 2010-Good Counsel
- 2011-St. John's
- 2012-St. Paul VI
- 2013-DeMatha
- 2014-St. John's
- 2015-St. John's
- 2016-St. John's
- 2017-St. John's
- 2018-St. John's
- 2019-St. John's
- 2021-St. John’s
- 2022-Gonzaga
- 2023-St. John’s
- 2024-St. John's
- 2025-St. John's
- 2026-Bishop O'Connell High School

Champions
School	Championships
DeMatha	24
St. John's	17
Good Counsel	5
O'Connell	3
St. Paul VI	4
Carroll	2
Gonzaga	2

== Softball Champions ==
- 1994-O'Connell
- 1995-O'Connell
- 1996-O'Connell
- 1997-O'Connell
- 1998-O'Connell
- 1999-O'Connell
- 2000-Holy Cross
- 2001-Good Counsel
- 2002-Bishop Ireton
- 2003-O'Connell
- 2004-O'Connell
- 2005-O'Connell
- 2006-O'Connell
- 2007-O'Connell
- 2008-O'Connell
- 2009-O'Connell
- 2010-O'Connell
- 2011-O'Connell
- 2012-O'Connell
- 2013-O'Connell
- 2014-St. Mary's Ryken
- 2015-St. Mary's Ryken
- 2016-O'Connell
- 2017-O'Connell
- 2018-O'Connell
- 2019-St. Mary's Ryken
- 2021-O'Connell
- 2022-O'Connell
- 2023-O'Connell
- 2024-O'Connell
- 2025-O'Connell

Champions
School	Championships
O'Connell	25
St. Mary's Ryken	3
Holy Cross	1
Good Counsel	1
Bishop Ireton	1

== Boys soccer champions ==
- 1974-DeMatha
- 1975-Carroll
- 1976-Good Counsel
- 1977-Carroll
- 1978-Good Counsel
- 1979-Good Counsel
- 1980-O'Connell
- 1981-O'Connell
- 1982-O'Connell
- 1983-O'Connell
- 1984-O'Connell
- 1985-Bishop Ireton
- 1986-St. John's
- 1987-DeMatha
- 1988-Good Counsel
- 1989-St. Paul VI
- 1990-Bishop Ireton
- 1991-O'Connell
- 1992-Gonzaga/St. Paul VI
- 1993-McNamara
- 1994-Bishop Ireton
- 1995-St. Paul VI
- 1996-O'Connell
- 1997-St. Paul VI
- 1998-O'Connell
- 1999-DeMatha
- 2000-Gonzaga
- 2001-Gonzaga
- 2002-Gonzaga
- 2003-DeMatha
- 2004-DeMatha
- 2005-DeMatha
- 2006-Gonzaga
- 2007-Gonzaga
- 2008-Gonzaga
- 2009-Gonzaga
- 2010-DeMatha
- 2011-DeMatha
- 2012-Gonzaga
- 2013-DeMatha
- 2014-DeMatha
- 2015-DeMatha
- 2016-Gonzaga
- 2017-Gonzaga
- 2018-The Heights (1st year in league)
- 2019-Gonzaga
- 2021-Good Counsel
- 2022-Gonzaga
- 2023-The Heights
- 2024-Gonzaga
- 2025-Gonzaga

Champions
School	Championships
Gonzaga	15
DeMatha	11
O'Connell	8
Good Counsel	5
St. Paul VI	4
Ireton	3
Carroll	2
The Heights	2
St. John's	1
McNamara	1

== Boys Lacrosse ==
- 1987-Bishop Ireton
- 1988-Dematha
- 1989-Dematha
- 1990-Dematha
- 1991-Dematha
- 1992-Gonzaga
- 1993-Gonzaga
- 1994-Dematha
- 1995-Dematha
- 1996-Dematha
- 1997-Gonzaga
- 1998-Gonzaga
- 1999-Dematha
- 2000-Dematha
- 2001-Dematha
- 2002-Dematha
- 2003-Dematha
- 2004-Dematha
- 2005-Dematha
- 2006-Dematha
- 2007-St. Mary's Ryken
- 2008-Dematha
- 2009-Dematha
- 2010-Gonzaga
- 2011-Gonzaga
- 2012-Gonzaga
- 2013-Gonzaga
- 2014-Gonzaga
- 2015-Gonzaga
- 2016-Gonzaga
- 2017-St. John's
- 2018-Gonzaga
- 2019-Gonzaga
- 2020-NA
- 2021-NA
- 2022-St. John's
- 2023-St. John's
- 2024-Gonzaga
- 2025-DeMatha

Champions
School	Championships
DeMatha	18
Gonzaga	14
Bishop Ireton	1
St. Mary's Ryken	1
St. John's	3

== Wrestling champions ==
- 1975-Carroll
- 1976-Bishop McNamara
- 1977-Good Counsel
- 1978-Good Counsel
- 1979-St. John's
- 1980-Good Counsel
- 1981-Good Counsel
- 1982-O'Connell
- 1983-O'Connell
- 1984-Bishop McNamara
- 1985-O'Connell
- 1986-Dematha
- 1987-Dematha
- 1988-Dematha
- 1989-Dematha
- 1990-Dematha
- 1991-Dematha
- 1992-Dematha
- 1993-Dematha
- 1994-Dematha
- 1995-Dematha
- 1996-Dematha
- 1997-Dematha
- 1998-Dematha
- 1999-Dematha
- 2000-Dematha
- 2001-Dematha/O'Connell
- 2002-Dematha
- 2003-Dematha
- 2004-Dematha
- 2005-Dematha
- 2006-Dematha
- 2007-Dematha
- 2008-Dematha
- 2009-O'Connell
- 2010-Dematha
- 2011-Good Counsel
- 2012-Dematha
- 2013-Good Counsel
- 2014-Good Counsel
- 2015-Good Counsel
- 2016-Good Counsel
- 2017-St. John's
- 2018-St. John’s
- 2019-St. John’s
- 2020-St. Mary’s Ryken

Champions
School	Championships
DeMatha	25
Good Counsel	9
O'Connell	5
St. John’s	4
Bishop McNamara	2
Carroll	1
St. Mary’s Ryken	1

== Golf champions ==
- 1973-Good Counsel
- 1974-Good Counsel
- 1975-Good Counsel
- 1976-St. John's
- 1977-St. John's
- 1978-St. John's
- 1979-St. John's
- 1980-Bishop McNamara
- 1981-Dematha
- 1982-Good Counsel
- 1983-Dematha
- 1984-Dematha
- 1985-Dematha
- 1986-Bishop McNamara
- 1987-Good Counsel
- 1988-Bishop McNamara
- 1989-Dematha
- 1990-Good Counsel
- 1991-Gonzaga
- 1992-Good Counsel
- 1993-Dematha
- 1994-Dematha
- 1995-Dematha
- 1996-Dematha
- 1997-Dematha
- 1998-Dematha
- 1999-Dematha
- 2000-O'Connell
- 2001-St. Paul VI
- 2002-Gonzaga
- 2003-St. Paul VI
- 2004-Dematha
- 2005-Gonzaga
- 2006-Gonzaga
- 2007-Gonzaga
- 2008-Dematha
- 2009-St. Paul VI
- 2010-Gonzaga
- 2011-Gonzaga
- 2012-Gonzaga
- 2013-Gonzaga
- 2014-St. Paul VI
- 2015-Gonzaga
- 2016-Gonzaga
- 2017-Gonzaga
- 2018-Gonzaga
- 2019-Gonzaga

Champions
School	Championships
Gonzaga	14
Dematha	14
Good Counsel	7
St. Paul VI	4
St. John's	4
Bishop McNamara	3
O'Connell	1

== Boys Tennis champions ==
- 1979-Archbishop Carroll
- 1982-O'Connell
- 1983-St. John's
- 1984-St. John's
- 1985-Gonzaga
- 1986-Gonzaga
- 1987-Gonzaga
- 1988-Gonzaga
- 1989-Gonzaga
- 1990-Gonzaga
- 1991-Gonzaga
- 1992-Gonzaga
- 1993-Gonzaga
- 1994-Gonzaga
- 1995-Gonzaga
- 1996-DeMatha
- 1997-DeMatha
- 1998-DeMatha
- 1999-DeMatha
- 2000-DeMatha
- 2001-Good Counsel
- 2002-DeMatha
- 2003-DeMatha
- 2004-DeMatha
- 2005-Gonzaga
- 2006-Gonzaga
- 2007-DeMatha
- 2008-Gonzaga
- 2009-DeMatha
- 2010-Gonzaga
- 2011-Gonzaga
- 2012-Gonzaga
- 2013-Gonzaga
- 2014-Gonzaga
- 2015-O'Connell
- 2016-Gonzaga
- 2017-Gonzaga
- 2018-Good Counsel
- 2019-Gonzaga
- 2022-Gonzaga
- 2023-DeMatha
- 2024-Bishop Ireton
- 2025-DeMatha

Champions
School	Championships
Gonzaga	23
Dematha	12
O'Connell	2
St. John's	2
Good Counsel	2
Archbishop Carroll	1
Bishop Ireton	1

== Boys Ice Hockey champions ==
- 2017- DeMatha
- 2018- DeMatha
- 2019- DeMatha
- 2020- DeMatha
- 2022- St. John's
- 2023- St. John's
- 2024- St. John's
- 2025- Gonzaga
- 2026- St. John's

Champions
School	Championships
DeMatha	4
St. John's	4
Gonzaga	1

== Boys Swim and Dive Champions ==
- 2018-Gonzaga
- 2019-Gonzaga
- 2020-Gonzaga
- 2021-Gonzaga
- 2022-Gonzaga
- 2023-Gonzaga
- 2024-Gonzaga
- 2025-Gonzaga
- 2026-DeMatha

Champions
School	Championships
Gonzaga	8
DeMatha	1

== Alumni ==
Archbishop Carroll

- Jeremiah Attaochu (2011), Former NFL player
- Ruben Boumtje-Boumtje (1997), Former NBA player
- Eddie Jordan (1973), Former NBA player and coach, current assistant coach with the Charlotte Hornets
- Kris Joseph (2008), former NBA player
- Jevon Langford (1992), Former NFL player
- Mike Lonergan (1984), Former basketball head coach Catholic University of America, University of Vermont, George Washington University
- Lawrence Moten (attended but did not graduate), Former NBA player
- John Thompson, Jr. (1961), Former NBA player and men's basketball coach at Georgetown University
- Jamal Williams (1995), Former NFL player

Bishop Ireton

- Charlie Raphael, Former professional soccer player

Bishop McNamara

- Waine Bacon, Former NFL player
- Todd Bozeman, Current basketball coach at Morgan State University
- Jerome Couplin III, former NFL player
- Brandon Coleman, former NFL player
- Tyoka Jackson, Former NFL player
- Ty Lawson, former NBA player
- Talib Zanna, Former NBA player

Bishop O'Connell

- Nataly Arias, Former professional soccer player
- Gibran Hamdan, Former NFL player
- Kendall Marshall, Current NBA player
- Eric Metcalf, Former NFL player
- Melo Trimble, Current professional basketball player
- Terrence Wilkins, Former NFL player
- Kate Ziegler, World champion swimmer

DeMatha

- Johnny Austin, Former NBA player
- Keith Bogans, Former NBA player
- Adrian Branch, Former NBA player
- JB Brown, Former NFL player
- Mike Brey, Current basketball coach at Notre Dame
- Kenny Carr, Former NBA player
- Sid Catlett, Former NBA player
- Brett Cecil, Former MLB player
- Adrian Dantley, Former NBA player
- Steve Farr, Former MLB player
- Danny Ferry, Former NBA player
- Joseph Forte, Former NBA player
- Markelle Fultz, Current NBA player
- Jerami Grant, Current NBA player
- Jerian Grant, Current G-League player, Former NBA Player
- Jordan Graye, Current MLS player
- Bill Hamid, Current MLS player, member of USMNT
- Mike Johnson, Former NFL player
- Arie Kouandjio, Former NFL player
- Cyrus Kouandjio, Former NFL player
- Sidney Lowe, Former NBA player
- Rodney McLeod, Current NFL player
- Derek Mills, Olympic Gold Medalist
- Jerrod Mustaf, Former NBA player
- Quinn Ojinnaka, Former NFL player, current wrestler
- John Owens, Former NFL player
- Tony Paige, Former NFL player
- Victor Oladipo, Current NBA player
- Paul Rabil, Former MLL player, Co-Founder PLL
- Steve Smith, Former NFL player
- Cameron Wake, Former NFL player
- Brian Westbrook, Former NFL player
- Charles Whitney, Former NBA player
- Bernie Williams, Former NBA player
- Edwin Williams, Former NFL player
- Josh Wilson, Former NFL player
- Chase Young, Current NFL player

Gonzaga

- Johnson Bademosi, Current NFL player
- Mike Banner, Former MLS player
- Colin Cloherty, Current NFL player
- Curome Cox, Current NFL player
- Olu Fashanu, Current NFL Player
- A. J. Francis, Current NFL player
- Joey Haynos, Current NFL player
- Kevin Hogan, Current NFL player
- Kris Jenkins (basketball), Current Euroleague player
- Cam Johnson, Current NFL player
- Malcolm Johnson, Former NFL player
- Jon Morris, Former NFL player
- Roman Oben, Former NFL player
- John Thompson III, Former basketball coach at Georgetown University
- Caleb Williams, Current NFL player

Good Counsel

- Blake Countess Current NFL player
- Stefon Diggs, Current NFL player
- Kendall Fuller Current NFL player
- Chas Gessner, Former NFL player
- Zach Hilton, Former NFL player
- Marty Hurney, Former NFL General Manager
- Jelani Jenkins, Current NFL player
- Roger Mason, Former NBA player

St. Paul VI

- Erick Green, Current professional basketball player
- Eddie Royal, Former NFL player, (graduated from Westfield High School)
- Mike Venafro, Former MLB Pitcher

St. John's

- Gene Augusterfer, Former NFL player
- Conrad Bolston, Former NFL player
- Marissa Coleman, Former WNBA player
- Perry Currin, Former MLB player
- Scott Glacken, Former NFL player
- Chris Harrison, Former NFL player
- Nick Howard, Current MLB player
- L.J. Hoes, Former MLB player
- Rakim Jarrett, Current NFL player
- Mike Kruczek, Former NFL player
- Bobby Lewis, Former NBA player
- Terrell Lewis, Current NFL player
- Tommy Marvaso, Former NFL player
- Marques Ogden, Former NFL player
- Kevin Plank, Founder, Brand Chief, and Executive Chairman of the Board of Under Armour
- Scotty Washington, current NFL player
- Jay Williams, Former NFL player
- Chris Wright, Former NBA player
