= Daniel Hamburg =

American politician (born 1948)

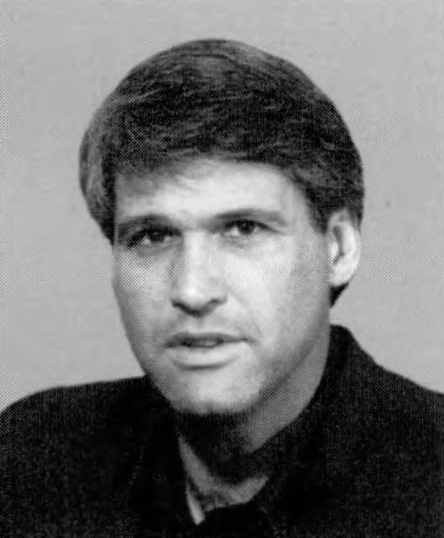
- Official portrait, 1993

Member of the U.S. House of Representatives from California's 1st district
- In office January 3, 1993 – January 3, 1995
- Preceded by: Frank Riggs
- Succeeded by: Frank Riggs

Member of the Mendocino County Board of Supervisors
- In office January 4, 2011 – January 8, 2019
- Preceded by: David Colfax
- Succeeded by: Ted Williams
- Constituency: 5th district
- In office January 5, 1981 – January 7, 1985
- Preceded by: Ernest Banker
- Succeeded by: Nelson Redding
- Constituency: 2nd district

Personal details
- Born: October 6, 1948 (age 78) St. Louis, Missouri, U.S.
- Party: Democratic (before 1998); Green (1998–present)
- Spouse(s): Carrie Alexander; Sara Stark
- Education: Stanford University (BA); California Institute of Integral Studies (MA)

Daniel Hamburg (born October 6, 1948) is an American politician in Northern California who was elected as a Democratic Party Congressman in 1992, serving one term from 1993 to 1995. In 1998, he was the Green Party gubernatorial candidate in California. He remains active in the Green Party.

He had settled in Mendocino County, California after graduating from Stanford University. In Ukiah he founded an alternative school and was active for several years on the planning commission. In 1980 he was elected as a member of the Mendocino County (California) Board of Supervisors, serving to 1985. He later was elected again twice to the Board of Supervisors, in 2010 and 2014, and served two terms, from 2011 through 2018.

== Early life ==
Hamburg was born in St. Louis, Missouri, the son of Jean (Milton) and Walter Hamburg. His father was of German descent, and his mother was of Ukrainian Jewish descent.

He attended Stanford University and graduated in 1971; later he received a master's degree from the California Institute of Integral Studies (CIIS) in San Francisco. He settled in Ukiah, California, where he founded an alternative school. Hamburg also became involved in local civic affairs and served on the city planning commission from 1976 to 1981. He began to learn about local and regional land use issues. He founded a cultural study program in China.

== Political career ==
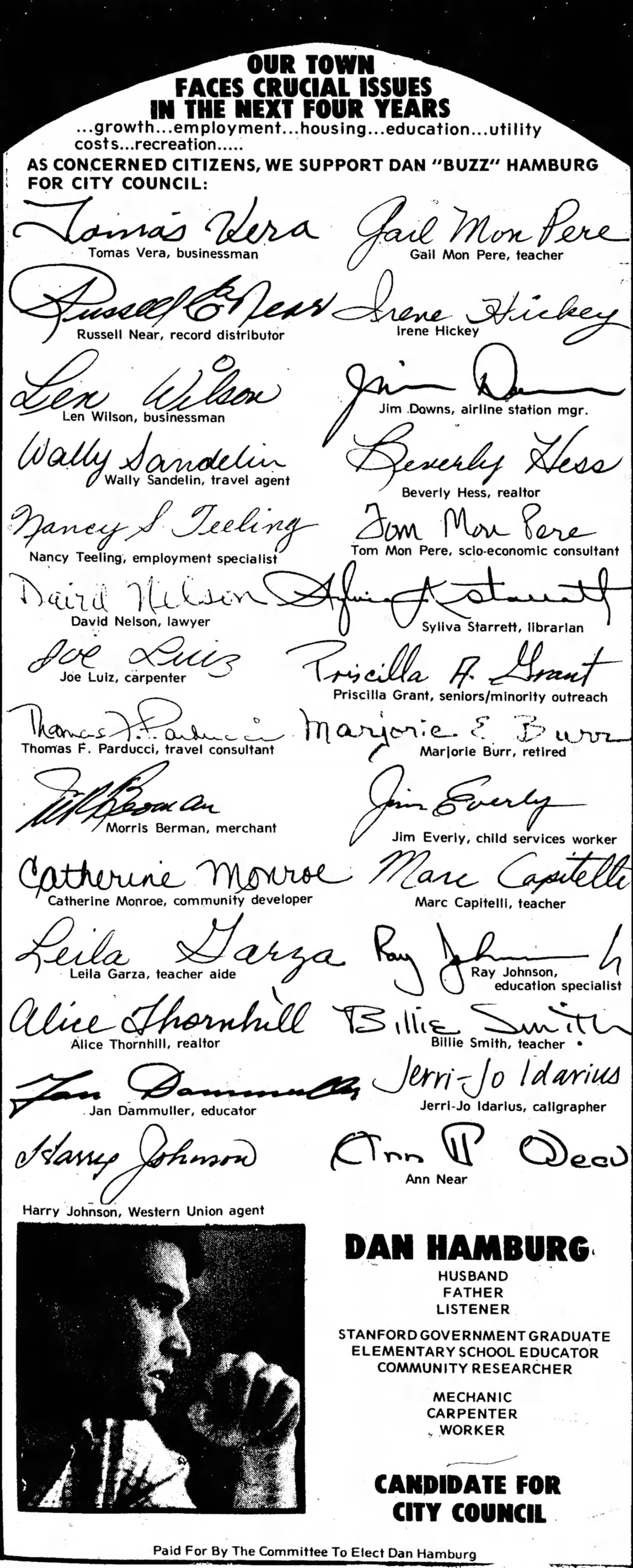
Advertisement for Hamburg's city council candidacy published in the Ukiah Daily Journal, March 1, 1976

Hamburg first ran for public office in 1976, when he campaigned unsuccessfully for Ukiah City Council. He continued to be active in politics as a member of the Democratic Party. He was elected to the Mendocino County Board of Supervisors, serving a four-year term from 1981 to 1985.

=== Congress ===
In 1992, he was elected to California's 1st congressional district, beating Republican incumbent Frank Riggs. While in Congress, Hamburg was named one of People magazine's "50 Most Beautiful People" in 1993.

In the 1994 mid-term elections, in which Republicans made gains, Riggs defeated Hamburg in a rematch.

=== Green Party ===
Hamburg later became a member of the Green Party and ran as the Green Party nominee for California governor in 1998. He was the first candidate from the Green Party of California to run for governor. He finished a distant third among seven candidates with 104,117 votes, gaining 1.3% of the total vote. During the 2000 presidential election, Hamburg backed Green presidential candidate Ralph Nader.

=== Return to Board of Supervisors ===
In November 2010 Hamburg was elected for a second time to the 5th District seat on the Mendocino County Board of Supervisors. Hamburg ran unopposed for reelection in June 2014, and retired from the board in 2018.

== Advocacy ==
Hamburg became executive director of Voice of the Environment. On December 8, 2004, he and his wife Carrie were arrested for trying to deliver a letter to Ohio Secretary of State Ken Blackwell concerning alleged voter fraud in Ohio in the 2004 U.S. presidential election.

== Electoral history ==
California's 1st congressional district: Results 1992–1994
| Year | Democrat | Votes | Pct | Republican | Votes | Pct | | 3rd Party | Party | Votes | Pct | 3rd Party | Party | Votes | Pct |
|---|---|---|---|---|---|---|---|---|---|---|---|---|---|---|---|
| 1992 | Dan Hamburg | 119,676 | 48% | Frank D. Riggs | 113,266 | 45% | | Phil Baldwin | Peace and Freedom | 10,764 | 4% | Matthew L. Howard | Libertarian | 7,500 | 3% |
| 1994 | Dan Hamburg | 93,717 | 47% | Frank D. Riggs | 106,870 | 53% | * | | | | | | | | |

Write-in and minor candidate notes: In 1994, write-ins received 86 votes.

1998 California gubernatorial election
| Candidate | Party | Votes | % |
|---|---|---|---|
| Gray Davis | Democratic | 4,860,702 | 57.97 |
| Dan Lungren | Republican | 3,218,030 | 38.36 |
| Dan Hamburg | Green | 104,179 | 1.24 |
| Steve W. Kubby | Libertarian | 73,845 | 0.88 |
| Gloria Estela LaRiva | Peace and Freedom | 59,218 | 0.71 |
| Nathan E. Johnson | American Independent Party | 37,964 | 0.45 |
| Harold H. Bloomfield | Natural Law | 31,237 | 0.37 |
| | | 7,418,890 | |

== See also ==
- List of Jewish members of the United States Congress

U.S. House of Representatives
| Preceded by Frank Riggs | Member of the U.S. House of Representatives from California's 1st congressional district 1993–1995 | Succeeded by Frank Riggs |
U.S. order of precedence (ceremonial)
| Preceded by Ernie Konnyu as Former U.S. Representative | Order of precedence of the United States as Former U.S. Representative | Succeeded by Michael Huffington as Former U.S. Representative |
