= Our Lady of Good Counsel High School (Maryland) =

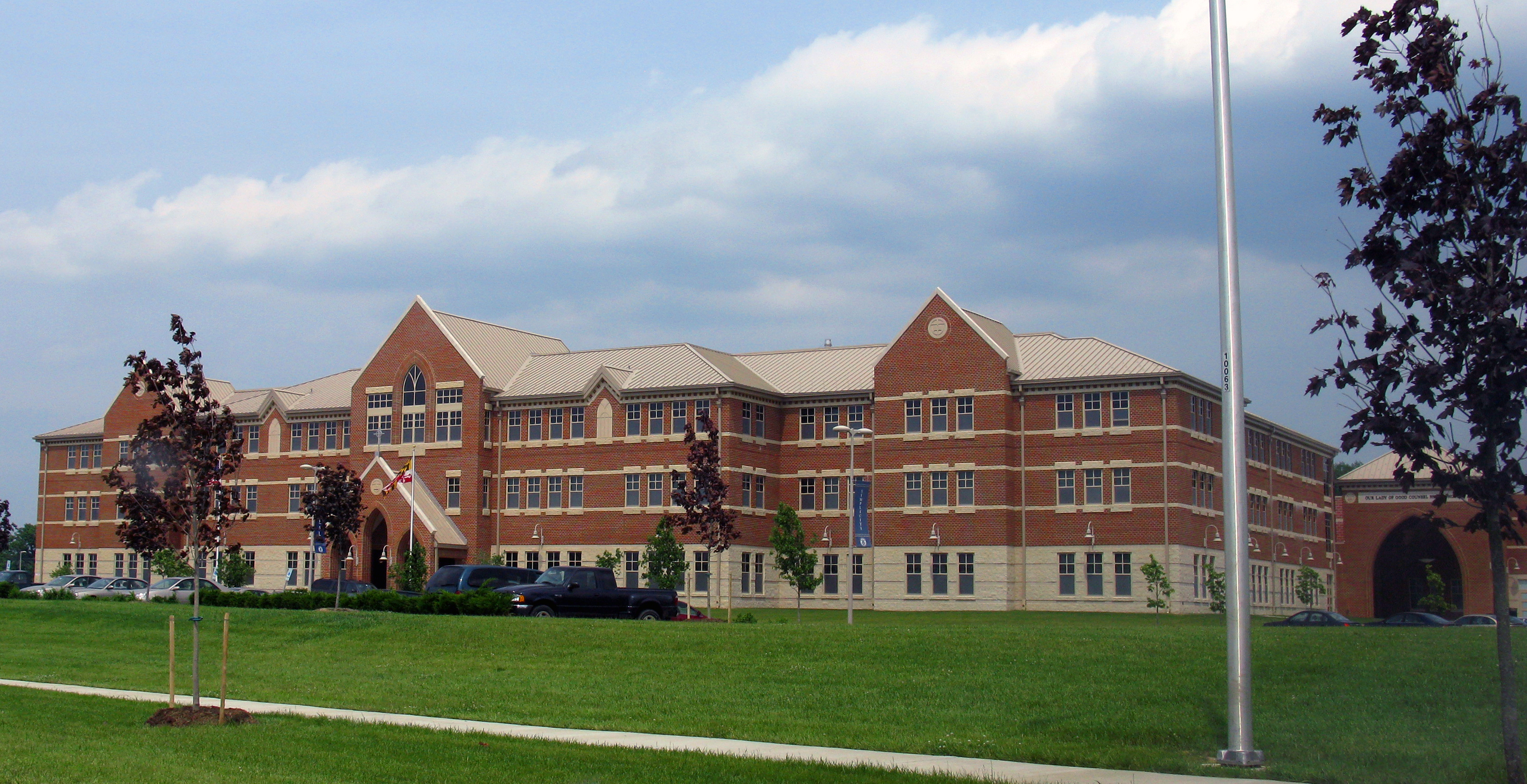

Location
- 17301 Old Vic Boulevard; Olney, Maryland 20832; 39°8′30″N 77°2′43″W

Information
- Type: Private, Coeducational
- Motto: Faciat Maria Nos Videre (English: Mary, make us see.)
- Religious affiliation: Catholic
- Established: 1958
- School district: Archdiocese of Washington Catholic Schools
- CEEB code: 211-083
- President: Mr. John Ciccone
- Principal: Mr. Edward Owusu
- Chaplain: Fr. Tom Lavin
- Grades: 9–12
- Enrollment: 1200+ (2019-2020)
- Campus: 51 acres (210,000 m^{2})
- Colors: Blue and Gold
- Slogan: We inspire our students to excel, serve, and love.
- Athletics conference: Washington Catholic Athletic Conference
- Mascot: Falcon
- Accreditation: Middle States Association of Colleges and Schools
- Publication: The Counselor (literary magazine)
- Newspaper: The Talon
- Tuition: $34,710
- Affiliation: Xaverian Brothers
- Admissions Director: Maria Nichols
- Athletic Director: Matt Blandin
- Website: https://www.olgchs.org/about-us/at-a-glance

Our Lady of Good Counsel High School is a private, Catholic, college-preparatory high school in Olney, Maryland, an unincorporated area of Montgomery County, Maryland. It is located in the Archdiocese of Washington.

Operated under the sponsorship of the Xaverian Brothers, Our Lady of Good Counsel serves students grades nine through twelve.

== History ==
The school was founded in 1958 as an all-boys school in Wheaton, Maryland. In 1988, the school became coeducational, and during the 2006–2007 school year, the school relocated to a new campus in Olney, about 7 miles (11 km) north of its previous location in Wheaton.

== Academics ==
Good Counsel High School has Advanced Placement courses, a STEM Program, and the International Baccalaureate Program. The school also has the Ryken Program, which is geared towards students with mild learning differences. It is named after Theodore Ryken, founder of the Xaverian Brothers.

The faculty consists of 200 teachers, counselors, and administrators. In 2002, Good Counsel High School was awarded the Blue Ribbon Award for Excellence in Secondary Education by the United States Department of Education. The school is fully accredited by the Middle States Association.

== Religious life ==
Students are required to take four years of religious studies classes as well as participate in religious retreats. There is a daily Mass as well as all-school Masses on major religious holy days. All students are required to complete a certain number of community service hours each year.

== Fine arts ==
The school offers theatre, band, chorus, dance, and visual arts classes. Musical ensembles include a wind ensemble, symphonic band, string ensemble, beginning and advanced percussion ensembles, jazz ensemble, and a marching band.

The school's theater program performs two mainstage productions a year. A 650-seat performing arts center opened in 2016. Good Counsel's theatre production of Les Misérables in 2013 received a five-star rating from the DC Metro Theatre Arts magazine.

== Athletics ==
Good Counsel competes in the WCAC and has many highly ranked athletic teams in the region. Many student-athletes have continued at the collegiate level and have received athletic scholarships at division one schools. The football team has had several players make it to the NFL.

WCAC Championships

- Baseball: 1972, 1986, 1990, 2006, 2010
- Basketball (girls): 1995, 2005, 2006, 2009, 2012
- Cross County (boys): 1976, 1977, 1983, 1996, 1999, 2000, 2001, 2002, 2003, 2007, 2011, 2013, 2014, 2015, 2016
- Cross Country (girls): 1989 (CGAA), 1996, 1999, 2000, 2002, 2003, 2006
- Field Hockey: 2004, 2005, 2007, 2013, 2014, 2018, 2019
- Football: 1995& 1996 (both WCAC Division II), 2009, 2010, 2011, 2012, 2019 (Capital)/Ryken (Metro), 2023 (Capital)/Ryken (Metro)
- Golf (boys): 1973, 1974, 1975, 1982, 1990, 1992
- Lacrosse (girls): 2001, 2004, 2005, 2006, 2007, 2008, 2009, 2010, 2011, 2013, 2015, 2022, 2023, 2024, 2025, 2026
- Soccer (boys): 1976, 1978, 1979, 1988, 2021
- Soccer (girls): 1995, 1998, 1999, 2000, 2001, 2009, 2010, 2012, 2013, 2014, 2015, 2018, 2019, 2023
- Swimming & Diving (girls): 2017–18, 2018–19, 2019–20, 2022–23, 2023–24, 2024-25
- Tennis (boys): 2001, 2018
- Tennis (girls): 1996, 2016, 2017, 2024
- Volleyball (girls): 1992, 1994, 2006, 2007, 2008, 2009, 2010, 2011
- Wrestling (boys): 1977, 1978, 1980, 1981, 2011, 2013, 2014, 2015, 2016

== Notable alumni ==
- Rev. Robert B. Lawton, S.J., Ph.D. (1965) – university president, Loyola Marymount University; former dean of Georgetown College at Georgetown University; graduate of Fordham University and Harvard University.
- Al Checchi (1966) – businessman; former co-chairman of Northwest Airlines; candidate for Governor of California in the 1998 California gubernatorial election; graduate of Amherst College and Harvard University.
- Marty Hurney (1974) – former professional football executive; former coordinator of football operations for San Diego Chargers; former director of football administration, director of player operations, and general manager for Carolina Panthers; former public relations, executive VP of football/player personnel, and advisor for Washington Commanders; former sports journalist, The Washington Star and The Washington Times; graduate of Catholic University of America.
- John Berry (1977) – former government official; former director of the United States Office of Personnel Management; former United States Ambassador to Australia; former director of the National Fish and Wildlife Foundation and the National Zoological Park; graduate of University of Maryland and Syracuse University.
- Kevin Blackistone (1977) – sports journalist; The Dallas Morning News; The Boston Globe; FanHouse; The Daily; The Washington Post; PBS News Hour; professor, Philip Merrill College of Journalism; panelist, ESPN's Around The Horn; guest host, ESPN's Pardon the Interruption; graduate of Northwestern University.
- Joseph Curl (1978) – writer and political columnist; White House correspondent for The Washington Times; Drudge Report; The Daily Wire.
- Christopher Jarzynski (1983) – physicist and professor; known for contributions to non-equilibrium thermodynamics and statistical mechanics; derived the now famous Jarzynski equality; winner of 2019 Lars Onsager Prize; graduate of Princeton University and University of California, Berkeley.
- Mark Povinelli (1989) – actor; Nightmare Alley, Pawn Shop Chronicles, The Hot Flashes, Mirror Mirror, Water for Elephants, Jackass 3D, Beer for My Horses, Epic Movie, Employee of the Month, The Polar Express, My Dinner with Hervé, Still the King, Mad Dogs, Dog with a Blog, Happyish, Anger Management, Criminal Minds, Breakout Kings, Are You There, Chelsea?, A.N.T. Farm, Modern Family, Boardwalk Empire, 'Til Death, Cold Case, It's Always Sunny in Philadelphia, Pushing Daisies, Charmed, The Parkers, The Hughleys; graduate of Miami University.
- Rick Yune (1989) – actor; The Fast and the Furious, Die Another Day, Snow Falling on Cedars, Alone in the Dark II, Ninja Assassin, The Man with the Iron Fists, Olympus Has Fallen, Alita: Battle Angel, Jiu Jitsu, Tetris, L2: Empuraan, Another World, Any Day Now, The Division, Alias, Boston Legal, CSI, Hawaii Five-0, Marco Polo, Prison Break, Wu-Tang: An American Saga, Scarface: The World Is Yours; graduate of University of Pennsylvania.
- Elizabeth Scott (1993) – swimmer; United States Paralympian; earned 17 Paralympic medals (10 gold, 2 silver and 5 bronze) in three Paralympic Games between 1992 and 2000 (Barcelona, Atlanta and Sydney).
- Zach Hilton (1998) – former professional football player for the NFL's New Orleans Saints, New York Jets, Washington Commanders, and San Francisco 49ers and the AFL's New Orleans VooDoo; graduate of University of North Carolina.
- Chas Gessner (1999) – former professional football player; Super Bowl XXXVIII champion with New England Patriots; formerly of Berlin Thunder, New York Jets, Tampa Bay Buccaneers, Orlando Predators, Seattle Seahawks, Florida Tuskers, Spokane Shock, and Virginia Destroyers; graduate of Brown University.
- Roger Mason Jr. (1999) – former professional basketball player; 2002 second-round draft pick by NBA's Chicago Bulls; formerly of the Toronto Raptors, Olympiacos, Hapoel Jerusalem, Washington Wizards, San Antonio Spurs, New York Knicks, New Orleans Hornets, and Miami Heat; former deputy executive director of the NBA Players Association; former president and commissioner of Big3; graduate of University of Virginia.
- Dhonielle Clayton (2001) – author; The Belles, Tiny Pretty Things, Blackout, Black Enough; CEO of We Need Diverse Books.
- James Gist (2004) – former professional basketball player; 2008 second-round draft pick by NBA's San Antonio Spurs; formerly of Biella, Lokomotiv Kuban, Partizan, Fenerbahçe, Málaga, Panathinaikos, Crvena zvezda, Bayern Munich, ASVEL, Bahçeşehir Koleji, Peñarol, and Prawira Bandung; graduate of University of Maryland.
- Jelani Jenkins (2009) – 2013 fourth-round draft pick by NFL's Miami Dolphins; former linebacker for Oakland Raiders, Buffalo Bills, and Houston Texans; graduate of University of Florida.
- Lou Young (2010) – former defensive back for the NFL's Denver Broncos, Baltimore Ravens, Jacksonville Jaguars, Carolina Panthers, Washington Commanders, Arizona Cardinals, and the AAF's Atlanta Legends; graduate of Georgia Tech.
- Rodney Glasgow Jr. (2010) – professional basketball player for Sheffield Sharks; formerly of BBC Monthey, Leuven Bears, BC Prievidza, Newcastle Eagles, and Njarðvík; graduate of Virginia Military Institute.
- Blake Countess (2011) – 2016 sixth-round pick by NFL's Philadelphia Eagles; former defensive back for Los Angeles Rams, New York Jets, Baltimore Ravens, New Jersey Generals; Super Bowl LVI champion; attended University of Michigan and Auburn University.
- Phylicia Pearl Mpasi (2011) – actress; The Color Purple (2023); Broadway and National Tour cast member of The Lion King; 55th NAACP Image Awards winner for Outstanding Breakthrough Performance in a Motion Picture.
- Stefon Diggs (2012) – wide receiver for NFL's New England Patriots; 2015 fifth-round pick by NFL's Minnesota Vikings; formerly of Buffalo Bills and Houston Texans; 2020 NFL First Team All-Pro; four-time Pro Bowl; attended University of Maryland.
- Jack Conger (2013) – former swimmer for USA Swimming; Rio de Janeiro 2016 Summer Olympics 4 × 200 meter freestyle relay gold medalist; NCAA record holder for the 200-yard butterfly; graduate of University of Texas at Austin.
- Kendall Fuller (2013) – 2016 third-round pick by NFL's Washington Commanders; former defensive back for Detroit Lions and Miami Dolphins; Super Bowl LIV champion with NFL's Kansas City Chiefs; attended Virginia Tech.
- Dorian O'Daniel (2013) – 2018 third-round pick by NFL's Kansas City Chiefs; former linebacker for Pittsburgh Maulers; winner of 2017 College Football Playoff National Championship with Clemson University; Super Bowl LIV champion.
- Midge Purce (2013) – current member of senior United States women's national soccer team and Gotham FC of the NWSL; drafted with the 9th pick in the 2017 NWSL College Draft by the Boston Breakers; formerly of Portland Thorns; 2021 NWSL Best XI; named to 2023 Forbes 30 Under 30; elected to Harvard University's Board of Overseers; creator of The Offseason.
- Kyle Snyder (2014) – freestyle wrestler; 2016, 2017, and 2018 NCAA heavyweight champion; 2015, 2017, 2022, and 2025 World Champion; 2015, 2019, and 2023 Pan American Games champion; Rio de Janeiro 2016 Summer Olympics 97 kg freestyle gold medalist; Tokyo 2020 Summer Olympics 97 kg freestyle silver medalist.
- Imani Dorsey (2014) – former member of senior United States women's national soccer team and the Utah Royals of the NWSL; drafted with the 5th pick in the 2018 NWSL College Draft by Gotham FC; 2018 NWSL Rookie of the Year.
- Sam Mustipher (2014) – former center for the NFL's Denver Broncos, Los Angeles Chargers, Baltimore Ravens, Tennessee Titans, and Chicago Bears; graduate of University of Notre Dame.
- Uche Eke (2015) – gymnast; first-ever Olympic gymnast for Nigeria at Tokyo 2020 Summer Olympics; gold medal winner in pommel horse at 2019 African Games; graduate of University of Michigan.
- Nicole Enabosi (2015) – professional basketball player for MBK Ružomberok; member of Nigeria women's national basketball team at Paris 2024 Summer Olympics; graduate of University of Delaware.
- Stephen Schoch (2015) – NCAA baseball pitcher; attended Appalachian State University, UMBC, and University of Virginia.
- Keandre Jones (2016) – former linebacker for the NFL's Washington Commanders, Cincinnati Bengals, and Chicago Bears; attended Ohio State University and University of Maryland.
- Ayinde Eley (2017) – former linebacker for the CFL's Ottawa RedBlacks and BC Lions, and the NFL's Houston Texans and Carolina Panthers; graduate of University of Maryland.
- Lindsey Pulliam (2017) – professional basketball player for Jacksonville Waves; drafted by the Atlanta Dream in the third round of the 2021 WNBA draft; formerly of Slávia Banská Bystrica, Elazığ İl Özel İdarespor, CB Estudiantes, and Valur; silver medal winner for Team USA at 2019 Pan American Games; graduate of Northwestern University.
- Josh Paschal (2017) – 2022 second-round pick by NFL's Detroit Lions; graduate of University of Kentucky.
- Mohamed Ibrahim (2017) – former running back for NFL's Detroit Lions and Minnesota Vikings; graduate of University of Minnesota.
- Jalen Green (2019) – former defensive end for the CFL's Toronto Argonauts; 2023 First-Team NCAA All-American; graduate of James Madison University.
- Cam Hart (2019) – 2024 fifth-round pick by NFL's Los Angeles Chargers; graduate of University of Notre Dame.
- Heather Hinz (2019) – professional soccer player for Sydney FC; formerly of Houston Dash and Fort Lauderdale United FC; graduate of University of South Carolina.
- Jameese Joseph (2019) – current member of senior United States women's national soccer team and Chicago Red Stars of NWSL; graduate of North Carolina State University.
- Kris Jenkins (2020) – 2024 second-round pick by NFL's Cincinnati Bengals; winner of 2024 College Football Playoff National Championship with University of Michigan.
- Mitchell Melton (2020) – NFL defensive end for the Indianapolis Colts; attended Ohio State University and the University of Virginia.
- Bez Mbeng (2021) – professional basketball player for NBA's Utah Jazz; second rookie in Jazz history to record a triple-double; graduate of Yale University.
- Dilin Jones (2024) – college football running back at Louisiana State University; formerly of University of Wisconsin.
- Faheem Delane (2025) – college football safety at Louisiana State University; formerly of Ohio State University.
