= A. J. Verdelle =

American novelist

- Born: 1960 (age 64–65) Washington, D.C., U.S.
- Occupation: Novelist
- Education: University of Chicago (BA, MA); Bard College (MFA)
- Notable awards: Whiting Award (1996)
- Parents: A. Y. Jones; Patricia Howell Jones

A. J. Verdelle (born 1960 in Washington, D.C.), is an American novelist who is published by Algonquin Books and Harper, with essays published by Crown, the Smithsonian, the Whitney Museum, Random House, and University of Georgia Press. Verdelle has forthcoming novels from Random House imprint Spiegel & Grau.

== Life ==
A. J. Verdelle is the daughter of A. Y. and Patricia Howell Jones, both of whom were native Washingtonians. On her father's side, Verdelle is a fourth-generation Washingtonian, a descendant of the sequestered and little studied freedmen's community of free people of color that flourished in the 19th century after the end of slavery and reconstruction in the nation's capital.

Verdelle attended La Reine, a private Catholic girls' high school in Suitland, Maryland, a Prince George's County suburb of Washington, D.C. She graduated from college in 1982 from the University of Chicago with a B.A. in political science, earning an M.A. in Applied Statistics there in 1986. She earned an MFA in creative writing from Bard College, in the Hudson Valley of New York, in 1993.

After receiving her M.A. in statistics, Verdelle moved to Brooklyn, New York, and founded a statistics consulting firm in 1988.

Verdelle's prize-winning first novel, The Good Negress, was published to considerable acclaim in 1995. It was released in paperback in 1996. Nobel laureate Toni Morrison called the novel "truly extraordinary." Verdelle has taught Creative Writing at Princeton University, and Vermont College; she teaches in the MFA program at Lesley University.

In 2010, Verdelle was featured in a documentary, Cheating the Stillness, chronicling the life of Julia Peterkin, who, in 1929, was the first American woman to be awarded the Pulitzer Prize. Peterkin wrote several novels about black life in the plantation South. Peterkin's perspectives were searingly intimate, and some readers thought that she must be African American. Verdelle had studied Peterkin's oeuvre, and featured her novel Scarlet Sister Mary in the narrative interior of The Good Negress.

== Awards ==
- Finalist, Los Angeles Times Book Prize
- Finalist, PEN/Faulkner Award
- Vursell Award, American Academy of Arts and Letters
- 1996 Whiting Award

== Works ==
- The Good Negress. Algonquin Books. 1995. ISBN 978-1-56512-085-3. "A.J. Verdelle."

=== Criticism ===
- Carolyn C. Denard, ed. (2008). "Loose Magic: A.J. Verdelle Interviews Toni Morrison". Toni Morrison: conversations. University Press of Mississippi. ISBN 978-1-60473-019-7.
