= Chism =

Chism is a surname. Notable people with the surname include:

- Cameron Chism (born 1990), American football player
- Efton Chism (born 2001), American football player
- Tina Gordon Chism, American screenwriter and film director
- Tom Chism (born 1955), American baseball player
- Wayne Chism (born 1987), American basketball player
- Philip Chism (born 1999), American student, the killer of Colleen Ritzer
