= Liatu King =

American basketball player (born 2002)

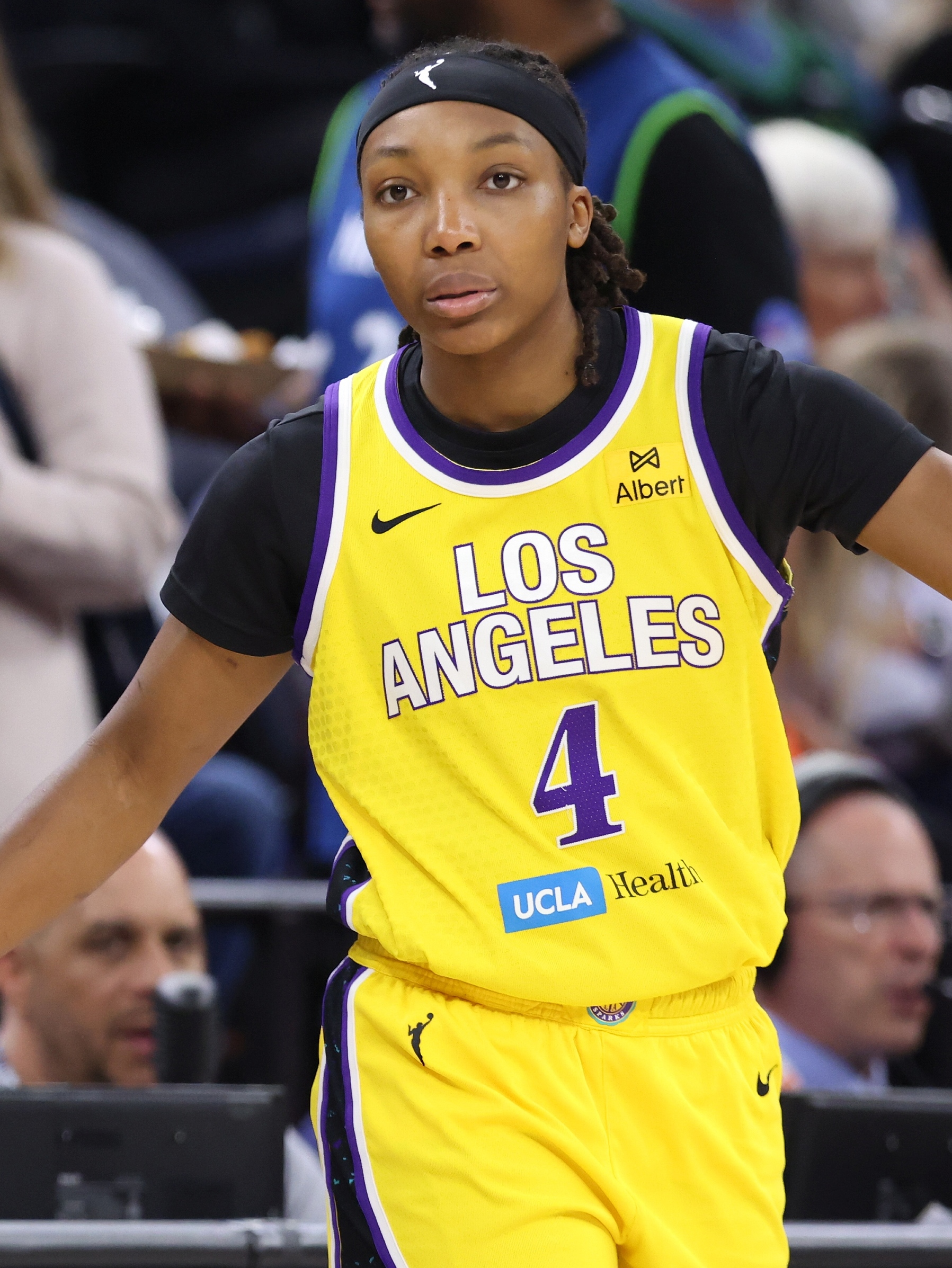
- King with the Los Angeles Sparks in 2025

No. 2 – Minnesota Lynx
- Position: Forward
- League: WNBA

Personal information
- Born: February 10, 2002 (age 24) Washington, D.C., U.S.
- Listed height: 5 ft 11 in (1.80 m)
- Listed weight: 178 lb (81 kg)

Career information
- High school: Bishop McNamara (Forestville, Maryland)
- College: Pittsburgh (2020–2024); Notre Dame (2024–2025)
- WNBA draft: 2025: 3rd round, 28th overall pick
- Drafted by: Los Angeles Sparks

Career history
- 2025: Los Angeles Sparks
- 2025: Dallas Wings
- 2026–present: Minnesota Lynx

Career highlights
- First-team All-ACC (2024); Second-team All-ACC (2025)
- Stats at WNBA.com
- Stats at Basketball Reference

Liatu King (/ˈliʌtu/, born February 10, 2002) is an American professional basketball player for the Minnesota Lynx of the Women's National Basketball Association (WNBA). She played college basketball for the Pittsburgh Panthers and Notre Dame Fighting Irish. King was selected by the Los Angeles Sparks in the third round of the 2025 WNBA draft.

== Early life ==
King was born on February 10, 2002, in Washington, D.C. She and her younger sister were born to deaf parents; King began learning American Sign Language (ASL) when she was nine months old. As a child, she played American football as a linebacker. She stood out on her middle school football team as a girl with male teammates and opponents.

King attended Bishop McNamara High School in Forestville, Maryland, where as a senior in 2020, she led the school's basketball team to a Washington Catholic Athletic Conference championship, the school's first since 2008; she scored a team-high 13 points in the championship game. She was named to the All-WCAC second team as a junior and the conference's first team as a senior, tallying 1,024 points, 1,018 rebounds, and a 28–5 record in her high school career.

== College career ==
King began her college basketball career with the Pittsburgh Panthers. She played in all 19 games of her freshman year, averaging 5.0 points and 4.6 rebounds per game, including a season-high 15 points in a win against the Clemson Tigers. She played in 26 games during her sophomore year, averaging 7.5 points and 7.1 rebounds per game and recording double-doubles in consecutive games on two occasions; during the Paradise Jam tournament, she followed a 10-point, 19-rebound performance against the Texas A&M Aggies with 23 points and 19 rebounds in a victory against the Northwestern Wildcats. In her junior year, King played in all 30 games, averaging 9.4 points, 7.6 rebounds, 1.4 blocks, and 1.2 assists per game and recording five more double-doubles, with standout performances in wins against the North Alabama Lions (26 points, 16 rebounds) and Duquesne Dukes (25 points, 11 rebounds, three blocks). In her senior year, she started in all 32 games and averaged 18.7 points, 10.3 rebounds, 1.8 assists, 1.8 steals, and 1.5 blocks per game on her way to securing 18 more double-doubles and first-team All-ACC honors. She was also named the ACC's most-improved player for 2024 – the first Pittsburgh player to win a major individual ACC award – and was one of three players in the conference that season to average a double-double. She scored 30 points against the Northern Kentucky Norse and a career-high 34 points against the Notre Dame Fighting Irish, the most points that Notre Dame allowed to an individual player that season.

King's 18 double-doubles, 598 points, 329 rebounds, and 58 blocks as a senior ranked first, third, second, and first, respectively, in a season in Pittsburgh program history. Granted an extra year of NCAA eligibility due to the COVID-19 pandemic, she chose to play college basketball for a fifth season, transferring to Notre Dame to do so.

In her fifth-year senior season at Notre Dame, starting in all 33 games, King averaged 11.5 points and 2.0 steals per game. She also averaged 10.4 rebounds per game, a Notre Dame program record. King recorded 14 double-doubles on the season; CBS Sports called her Notre Dame's "X-factor". Notre Dame qualified for the 2025 NCAA Division I women's basketball tournament, advancing as far as the Sweet Sixteen. She recorded ten points and six points in a round of 64 win over the Stephen F. Austin Ladyjacks, added 18 points and 15 rebounds in a round of 32 victory against the Michigan Wolverines, and ended her college career with 17 points and 10 rebounds in Notre Dame's Sweet Sixteen loss to the TCU Horned Frogs. She was named second-team All-ACC for her season at Notre Dame.

== Professional career ==
=== WNBA ===
==== Los Angeles Sparks ====
King was selected in the third round (28th overall) of the 2025 WNBA draft by the Los Angeles Sparks. She played in the Sparks' preseason game on May 6, 2025, recording six points and four rebounds in five minutes. The Sparks waived King on May 11 but re-signed her to a hardship contract on May 20. In her first three regular-season games with the Sparks, her 12.7 minutes per game was the second-most among the team's bench players; she averaged 2.0 points and 3.3 rebounds per game in that span. On June 28, she was released by the Sparks after averaging 3.0 points, 2.1 rebounds, and 0.3 assists in 12 games.

==== Dallas Wings ====
On July 2, 2025, the Dallas Wings announced that they had signed King to a rest-of-season contract. She was waived by the Wings on July 8 after appearing in two games.

==== Minnesota Lynx ====
On April 16, 2026, King signed a training camp contract with the Minnesota Lynx. The Lynx waived her and re-signed her to a developmental contract on May 9. On June 28, the Lynx signed King to a standard player contract after waiving Teaira McCowan. She was waived by the Lynx on July 7. On July 10, she signed another player development contract with the team.

=== Overseas ===
King played for Mersin Gençlerbirliği during the 2025–26 season of the Turkish Women's Basketball League (TKBL), averaging 23.0 points, 14.2 rebounds, 3.0 assists, 2.4 steals, and 1.7 blocks per game in 22 games.

== Career statistics ==
Legend
GP	Games played	GS	Games started	MPG	Minutes per game	RPG	Rebounds per game
APG	Assists per game	SPG	Steals per game	BPG	Blocks per game	PPG	Points per game
TO	Turnovers per game	FG%	Field-goal percentage	3P%	3-point field-goal percentage	FT%	Free-throw percentage
**Bold**	Career best	°	League leader

=== WNBA ===
WNBA regular season statistics
Year	Team	GP	GS	MPG	FG%	3P%	FT%	RPG	APG	SPG	BPG	TO	PPG
2025	Los Angeles	**12**	0	**10.0**	.500	.167	**.733**	2.1	**0.3**	0.2	0.0	0.9	3.0
2025	Dallas	2	0	8.0	.333	—	—	2.0	0.0	0.0	0.0	**0.0**	1.0
2026	Minnesota	**12**	0	8.8	**.516**	**.200**	.533	**2.3**	0.2	**0.5**	**0.3**	0.2	**3.5**
**Career**	2 years, 3 teams	26	0	9.3	.500	.188	.633	2.2	0.2	0.3	0.2	0.6	3.1

=== College ===
NCAA statistics
Year	Team	GP	GS	MPG	FG%	3P%	FT%	RPG	APG	SPG	BPG	TO	PPG
2020–21	Pittsburgh	19	0	14.3	.461	—	.591	4.6	0.6	0.4	0.4	**0.9**	5.0
2021–22	Pittsburgh	26	16	19.8	.443	—	.571	7.1	1.0	0.6	0.7	1.7	7.5
2022–23	Pittsburgh	30	22	23.4	.394	—	.670	7.6	1.2	1.1	1.4	1.4	9.4
2023–24	Pittsburgh	32	32	**35.4**	.523	—	**.711**	10.3	**1.8**	1.8	**1.5**	3.4	**18.7**
2024–25	Notre Dame	**33**	**33**	29.8	**.563**	.000	.500	**10.4**	1.4	**2.0**	0.9	2.0	11.5
**Career**		140	103	25.8	.491	.000	.637	8.4	1.3	1.3	1.0	2.0	11.1
