= 1998 California gubernatorial election =

- November 3, 1998
- Turnout: 41.43%
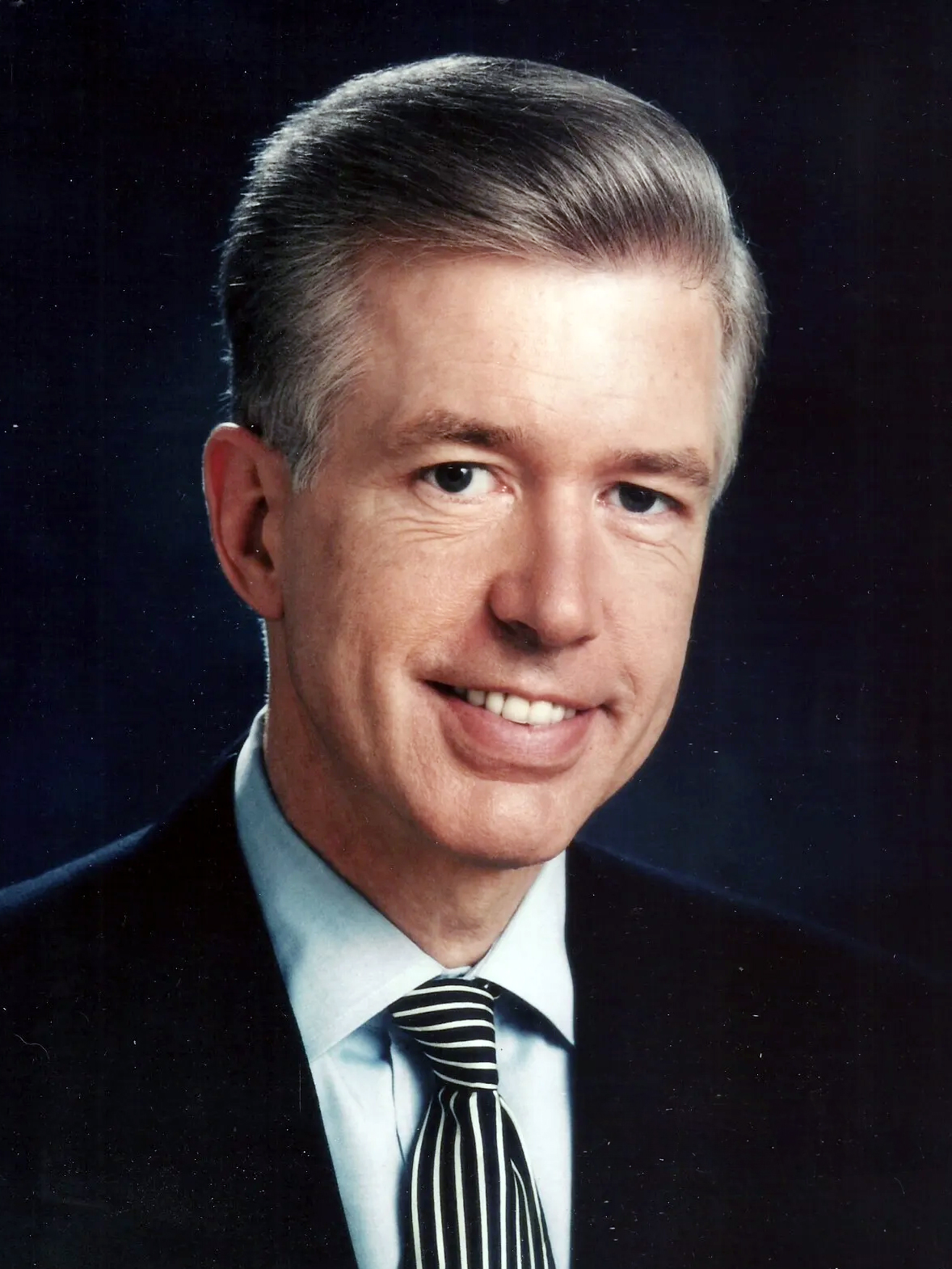

Nominee	Gray Davis	Dan Lungren
Party	Democratic	Republican
Popular vote	4,860,702	3,218,030
Percentage	57.97%	38.38%
- Davis: 40–50% 50–60% 60–70% 70–80% 80–90% Lungren: 40–50% 50–60%
Governor before election
Pete Wilson
Republican
Elected Governor
Gray Davis
Democratic

The 1998 California gubernatorial election was an election that occurred on November 3, 1998, resulting in the election of Lieutenant Governor Gray Davis as the state's first Democratic governor in 16 years. Davis won the general election by an almost 20% margin over his closest opponent, Republican Attorney General Dan Lungren. Davis succeeded Pete Wilson, who was term-limited. The 1998 California gubernatorial election featured the state's only gubernatorial blanket primary, a practice which was later struck down in United States Supreme Court in California Democratic Party v. Jones in 2000.

The primary occurred on June 2, 1998. Davis defeated fellow Democrats Jane Harman and Al Checchi for the Democratic nomination. Davis received more votes than Lungren, who ran against less well-known opponents in the Republican primary. The primary set a record for spending in a California gubernatorial primary. Davis won 30 of California's 58 counties; no Democrat would win a majority of the counties again until Gavin Newsom in 2018. (Note: Jerry Brown won 29 counties (exactly half) in 2014.) Davis carried Mono County by a single vote, becoming the first Democratic candidate to ever carry that county in a gubernatorial election. (Note: John R. McConnell, the Southern Democratic nominee in 1861, had won Mono County; 1861 was the first election that Mono County participated in. Independent John Bidwell also won Mono County in 1875. Until 1998, these were the only two elections in which the Republican candidate failed to carry Mono County.)

== Primary election ==
The Democratic field for the race became open when the state's most well-known and popular politician, Senator Dianne Feinstein, decided in January 1998 not to run for governor despite a request from President Bill Clinton. She decided not to run in the race because of the difficulty of campaigning, the "deteriorated" nature of California statewide campaigns, and her desire to continue her work in the Senate. Former White House Chief of Staff Leon Panetta also decided not to run.

Al Checchi, a Democratic airline executive and political newcomer, was among the first to declare for the race. Gray Davis also declared around the same time. Congresswoman Jane Harman joined the contest in early April 1998. In early polling the three candidates were within 12 points of each other, with Davis in last. Harman spent $14.4 million in her race for governor. Checchi spent just under $39 million on his campaign. The airline executive's campaign included numerous advertisings, one of which included school children trying to pronounce his name and another with his wife speaking Spanish. Checchi did not identify himself as a Democrat in most of his early campaign advertisings. Harman briefly overtook Checchi in state polls but declined after Checchi launched a series of negative campaign advertisings against her. Many of Feinstein's top campaign advisers worked for Harman during the Gubernatorial primary. Harman's campaign ran a biographical ad of her at the 1960 Democratic National Convention.

Davis ran on the campaign slogan "experience money can't buy", and he promised to make education his top priority, which matched voters' concerns in exit polls. All three major Democratic candidates made education one of their top priorities in the campaign. Davis was third in polling until the final week of the campaign, and because he had trouble raising money during the early months of the campaign, he did not run campaign advertisings early in the race as did Harman and Checchi. Davis spent 9 million in total campaign funds in the primary, and later criticized Checchi for giving money to Republicans Steve Forbes and Bob Dole in 1996. Davis finished first in the primary, followed by Lungren, Checchi, and Harman. Lungren spent $7.7 million in the primary.

=== Candidates ===
==== Democratic ====
- Gray Davis, incumbent lieutenant governor
- Jane Harman, U.S. Representative
- Al Checchi, businessman
- Chuck Pineda Jr.
- Pia Jensen
- Michael Palitz

==== Republican ====
- Dan Lungren, incumbent attorney general
- Dennis Peron, businessman, veteran, and activist
- James D. Crawford
- Eduardo M. Rivera
- Jeff Williams

==== Green ====
- Dan Hamburg, former U.S. Representative

==== Libertarian ====
- Steve Kubby, businessman

==== Peace and Freedom ====
- Gloria La Riva, activist and perennial candidate
- Marsha Feinland, perennial candidate

==== American Independent ====
- Nathan E. Johnson

==== Natural Law ====
- Harold H. Bloomfield, author

=== Results ===
Open primary results
Party	Candidate	Votes	%
Democratic	Gray Davis	2,083,396	34.74%
Democratic	Al Checchi	748,828	12.49%
Democratic	Jane Harman	741,251	12.36%
Democratic	Charles "Chuck" Pineda Jr.	23,367	0.39%
Democratic	Pia Jensen	12,403	0.21%
Democratic	Michael Palitz	12,050	0.20%
Republican	Dan Lungren	2,023,618	33.75%
Republican	Dennis Peron	72,613	1.21%
Republican	James D. Crawford	28,881	0.48%
Republican	Eduardo M. Rivera	22,222	0.37%
Republican	Jeff Williams	19,799	0.33%
Green	Dan Hamburg	92,298	1.54%
Libertarian	Steve W. Kubby	47,025	0.78%
Peace and Freedom	Gloria Estela La Riva	21,505	0.36%
Peace and Freedom	Marsha Feinland	15,572	0.26%
American Independent	Nathan E. Johnson	19,540	0.33%
Natural Law	Harold H. Bloomfield	12,422	0.21%
Invalid or blank votes		209,828	3.38%
Total votes		5,996,790 (Note: Total votes cast for candidates; does not include blank votes. The percentages in the Statement of Vote are based on this total, while the percentage for blank votes is calculated using the combined total of valid votes and blank votes.)	100.00%

== General election ==
=== Polling ===
Poll source	Date(s)	Sample size (Note: Key: A – all adults RV – registered voters LV – likely voters V – unclear)	Margin of error	Dan Lungren (R)	Gray Davis (D)	Other / undecided (Note: Calculated by taking the difference of 100% and all other candidates combined.)
SurveyUSA	November 1, 1998	800	—	37%	60%	3%
Harris Insights & Analytics	October 30, 1998	5,735	—	42%	53%	5%
The Field Institute	October 26–28, 1998	809 (LV)	± 3.5%	43%	50%	7%
The Field Institute	October 22–27, 1998	678 (LV)	± 4.0%	39%	53%	8%
Los Angeles Times	October 17–21, 1998	883 (LV)	± 4.0%	42%	53%	5%
Mason-Dixon Polling & Strategy	October 11–13, 1998	820 (LV)	± 3.5%	42%	48%	10%
Public Policy Institute of California	October 1–6, 1998	793 (LV)	± 3.5%	41%	49%	10%
The Fields Institute	September 27 – October 5, 1998	703 (LV)	± 3.7%	42%	48%	10%
Public Policy Institute of California	September 1–7, 1998	1,046 (LV)	± 3.0%	38%	47%	15%
The Field Institute	August 18–24, 1998	625 (LV)	± 4.1%	37%	49%	14%
Harris Insights & Analytics	October 20, 1998	4,531	—	39%	50%	11%
Mason-Dixon Polling & Strategy	July 26–28, 1998	832 (LV)	± 3.5%	39%	48%	13%
The Field Institute	March 5–15, 1998	727 (LV)	± 4.0%	42%	41%	17%

=== Results ===

1998 California gubernatorial election
Party	Candidate	Votes	%	±%
Democratic	Gray Davis	4,860,702	57.97%	+17.35%
Republican	Dan Lungren	3,218,030	38.38%	−16.80%
Green	Dan Hamburg	104,179	1.24%	
Libertarian	Steve Kubby	73,845	0.88%	−0.84%
Peace and Freedom	Gloria Estela La Riva	59,218	0.71%	−0.22%
American Independent	Nathan E. Johnson	37,964	0.45%	−1.09%
Natural Law	Harold H. Bloomfield	31,237	0.37%	
Independent	Gale Shangold (write-in)	16	0.00%	
Independent	Phillip Ashamallah (write-in)	3	0.00%	
Independent	Holden Charles Hollom (write-in)	1	0.00%	
Independent	Lark D. Jursek (write-in)	1	0.00%	
Invalid or blank votes		235,925	2.73%	
Majority		1,642,672	19.59%	
Total votes		8,385,196	100.00%	
Democratic gain from Republican		Swing	+34.15%	

=== Results by county ===
County	Gray Davis Democratic		Dan Lungren Republican		Dan Hamburg Green		Steve Kubby Libertarian		Gloria La Riva PFP		Nathan E. Johnson AIP		Harold H. Bloomfield NLP		Margin		Total votes cast
County	#	%	#	%	#	%	#	%	#	%	#	%	#	%	#	%	Total votes cast
Alameda	282,297	73.47%	86,745	22.58%	6,919	1.80%	3,041	0.79%	2,727	0.71%	1,130	0.29%	1,378	0.36%	195,552	50.89%	384,237
Alpine	285	50.35%	247	43.64%	14	2.47%	3	0.53%	8	1.41%	3	0.53%	6	1.06%	38	6.71%	566
Amador	6,614	49.20%	6,478	48.19%	86	0.64%	112	0.83%	64	0.48%	57	0.42%	32	0.24%	136	1.01%	13,443
Butte	30,184	46.00%	32,717	49.86%	1,176	1.79%	545	0.83%	362	0.55%	400	0.61%	233	0.36%	-2,533	-3.86%	65,617
Calaveras	7,358	45.46%	8,150	50.35%	149	0.92%	298	1.84%	71	0.44%	101	0.62%	59	0.36%	-792	-4.89%	16,186
Colusa	2,136	43.60%	2,621	53.50%	36	0.73%	39	0.80%	33	0.67%	27	0.55%	7	0.14%	-485	-9.90%	4,899
Contra Costa	190,200	62.82%	103,686	34.25%	3,239	1.07%	2,241	0.74%	1,399	0.46%	967	0.32%	1,020	0.34%	86,514	28.58%	302,753 (Note: Includes 1 for Shangold)
Del Norte	3,820	51.34%	3,087	41.49%	242	3.25%	87	1.17%	54	0.73%	103	1.38%	47	0.63%	733	9.85%	7,440
El Dorado	25,429	43.84%	30,534	52.64%	727	1.25%	575	0.99%	260	0.45%	283	0.49%	192	0.33%	-5,105	-8.80%	58,000
Fresno	82,293	47.68%	85,369	49.46%	962	0.56%	1,257	0.73%	1,421	0.82%	918	0.53%	388	0.22%	-3,076	-1.78%	172,608
Glenn	3,150	41.74%	4,140	54.86%	57	0.76%	54	0.72%	46	0.61%	77	1.02%	22	0.29%	-990	-13.12%	7,546
Humboldt	23,880	51.22%	17,658	37.88%	3,912	8.39%	489	1.05%	277	0.59%	204	0.44%	199	0.43%	6,222	13.35%	46,619
Imperial	13,262	56.15%	8,592	36.38%	202	0.86%	161	0.68%	1,033	4.37%	225	0.95%	144	0.61%	4,670	19.77%	23,619
Inyo	3,082	45.36%	3,377	49.70%	106	1.56%	69	1.02%	60	0.88%	70	1.03%	31	0.46%	-295	-4.34%	6,795
Kern	59,132	41.80%	78,213	55.29%	840	0.59%	872	0.62%	894	0.63%	1,040	0.74%	457	0.32%	-19,081	-13.49%	141,448
Kings	11,370	49.98%	10,704	47.06%	117	0.51%	116	0.51%	205	0.90%	184	0.81%	51	0.22%	666	2.93%	22,747
Lake	11,074	58.83%	6,734	35.77%	509	2.70%	208	1.10%	101	0.54%	118	0.63%	81	0.43%	4,340	23.05%	18,825
Lassen	3,792	45.85%	4,065	49.15%	83	1.00%	77	0.93%	77	0.93%	130	1.57%	46	0.56%	-273	-3.30%	8,270
Los Angeles	1,297,896	65.69%	615,642	31.16%	18,736	0.95%	15,978	0.81%	14,265	0.72%	7,004	0.35%	6,140	0.31%	682,254	34.53%	1,975,672 (Note: Includes 9 for Shangold, 2 for Ashamallah)
Madera	10,869	41.10%	14,864	56.20%	150	0.57%	196	0.74%	133	0.50%	162	0.61%	73	0.28%	-3,995	-15.11%	26,447
Marin	70,108	68.94%	27,392	26.94%	2,171	2.13%	938	0.92%	481	0.47%	259	0.25%	344	0.34%	42,716	42.00%	101,693
Mariposa	3,005	41.86%	3,855	53.70%	88	1.23%	103	1.43%	38	0.53%	70	0.98%	20	0.28%	-850	-11.84%	7,179
Mendocino	16,450	57.37%	8,659	30.20%	2,531	8.83%	456	1.59%	229	0.80%	193	0.67%	154	0.54%	7,791	27.17%	28,672
Merced	21,200	53.39%	17,535	44.16%	242	0.61%	187	0.47%	255	0.64%	194	0.49%	95	0.24%	3,665	9.23%	39,708
Modoc	1,428	40.74%	1,856	52.95%	45	1.28%	41	1.17%	39	1.11%	71	2.03%	25	0.71%	-428	-12.21%	3,505
Mono	1,641	47.35%	1,640	47.32%	60	1.73%	55	1.59%	21	0.61%	24	0.69%	25	0.72%	1	0.03%	3,466
Monterey	54,464	59.76%	33,053	36.27%	1,109	1.22%	7.93	0.87%	715	0.78%	505	0.55%	497	0.55%	21,411	23.49%	91,136
Napa	25,809	59.86%	15,193	35.24%	1,021	2.37%	419	0.97%	263	0.61%	208	0.48%	201	0.47%	10,616	24.62%	43,114
Nevada	17,522	44.98%	19,720	50.62%	875	2.25%	399	1.02%	168	0.43%	146	0.37%	129	0.33%	-2,198	-5.64%	38,959
Orange	318,198	44.69%	370,736	52.07%	6,622	0.93%	6,512	0.91%	4,235	0.59%	2,950	0.41%	2,807	0.39%	-52,538	-7.38%	712,060
Placer	38,734	43.55%	47,745	53.68%	747	0.84%	710	0.80%	343	0.39%	370	0.42%	292	0.33%	-9,011	-10.13%	88,941
Plumas	3,764	43.99%	4,472	52.26%	108	1.26%	95	1.11%	41	0.48%	49	0.57%	28	0.33%	-708	-8.27%	8,557
Riverside	173,567	51.15%	155,175	45.73%	2,463	0.73%	2,275	0.67%	2,728	0.80%	1,936	0.57%	1,205	0.36%	18,392	5.42%	339,349
Sacramento	206,870	57.37%	142,970	39.65%	3,344	0.93%	2,525	0.70%	2,290	0.64%	1,544	0.43%	1,018	0.28%	63,900	17.72%	360,561
San Benito	7,531	57.42%	4,967	37.87%	127	0.97%	184	1.40%	141	1.08%	83	0.63%	83	0.63%	2,564	19.55%	13,116
San Bernardino	174,629	52.60%	144,056	43.39%	2,982	0.90%	3,177	0.96%	3,229	0.97%	2,441	0.74%	1,507	0.45%	30,573	9.21%	332,021
San Diego	364,169	49.45%	340,834	46.28%	7,742	1.05%	8,439	1.15%	6,451	0.88%	4,369	0.59%	4,420	0.60%	23,335	3.17%	736,426 (Note: Includes 1 for Shangold, 1 for Ashamallah)
San Francisco	192,496	80.03%	36,464	15.16%	5,980	2.49%	2,143	0.89%	2,154	0.90%	666	0.28%	620	0.26%	156,032	64.87%	240,527 (Note: Includes 3 for Shangold, 1 for Hollom)
San Joaquin	64,377	52.03%	56,447	45.62%	715	0.58%	653	0.53%	705	0.57%	523	0.42%	315	0.25%	7,930	6.41%	123,735
San Luis Obispo	42,543	49.04%	40,363	46.53%	1,619	1.87%	829	0.96%	539	0.62%	502	0.58%	347	0.40%	2,180	2.51%	86,743 (Note: Includes 1 for Jursek)
San Mateo	142,144	68.43%	59,249	28.52%	2,382	1.15%	1,780	0.86%	947	0.46%	604	0.29%	607	0.29%	82,895	39.91%	207,713
Santa Barbara	65,937	53.33%	52,873	42.76%	1,895	1.53%	955	0.77%	878	0.71%	495	0.40%	604	0.49%	13,064	10.57%	123,637
Santa Clara	270,105	64.28%	133,015	31.66%	4,992	1.19%	5,395	1.28%	3,083	0.73%	1,720	0.41%	1,865	0.44%	137,090	32.63%	420,176
Santa Cruz	56,078	65.62%	23,699	27.73%	3,007	3.52%	1,179	1.38%	687	0.80%	355	0.42%	452	0.53%	32,379	37.89%	85,457
Shasta	23,076	43.28%	28,130	52.76%	479	0.90%	552	1.04%	351	0.66%	531	1.00%	196	0.37%	-5,054	-9.48%	53,315
Sierra	734	41.70%	924	52.50%	29	1.65%	45	2.56%	11	0.63%	12	0.68%	5	0.28%	-190	-10.80%	1,760
Siskiyou	7,493	45.54%	8,100	49.23%	256	1.56%	230	1.40%	122	0.74%	174	1.06%	79	0.48%	-607	-3.69%	16,454
Solano	63,791	62.81%	34,288	33.76%	1,003	0.99%	966	0.95%	658	0.65%	458	0.45%	395	0.39%	29,503	29.05%	101,559
Sonoma	103,235	64.29%	46,616	29.03%	6,631	4.13%	1,657	1.03%	944	0.59%	763	0.48%	728	0.45%	56,619	35.26%	160,575
Stanislaus	50,793	50.69%	47,095	47.00%	549	0.55%	543	0.54%	457	0.46%	535	0.53%	238	0.24%	3,698	3.69%	100,210
Sutter	9,296	42.07%	12,313	55.73%	131	0.59%	139	0.63%	73	0.33%	101	0.46%	42	0.19%	-3,017	-13.65%	22,095
Tehama	8,561	46.02%	9,343	50.23%	152	0.82%	170	0.91%	141	0.76%	179	0.96%	56	0.30%	-782	-4.20%	18,602
Trinity	2,447	49.01%	2,168	43.42%	132	2.64%	90	1.80%	57	1.14%	68	1.36%	31	0.62%	279	5.59%	4,993
Tulare	32,186	44.11%	39,072	53.54%	353	0.48%	493	0.68%	363	0.50%	373	0.51%	133	0.18%	-6,886	-9.44%	72,973
Tuolumne	9,731	48.38%	9,771	48.58%	201	1.00%	161	0.80%	70	0.35%	117	0.58%	61	0.30%	-40	-0.20%	20,112
Ventura	110,226	52.95%	91,093	43.73%	2,049	0.98%	1,616	0.78%	1,449	0.70%	911	0.44%	826	0.40%	19,133	9.19%	208,170
Yolo	31,939	63.06%	16,783	33.14%	958	1.89%	417	0.82%	264	0.52%	162	0.32%	125	0.25%	15,156	29.92%	50,648
Yuba	6,302	46.54%	6,743	49.79%	127	0.94%	106	0.78%	108	0.80%	100	0.74%	56	0.41%	-441	-3.26%	13,542
Total	4,860,702	57.97%	3,218,030	38.38%	104,179	1.24%	73,845	0.88%	59,218	0.71%	37,964	0.45%	31,237	0.37%	1,642,672	19.59%	8,385,196

==== Counties that flipped from Republican to Democratic ====
- Alpine
- Amador
- Contra Costa
- Del Norte
- Humboldt
- Imperial
- Kings
- Lake
- Los Angeles
- Mendocino
- Merced
- Mono
- Monterey
- Napa
- Riverside
- Sacramento
- San Benito
- San Bernardino
- San Diego
- San Joaquin
- San Luis Obispo
- Santa Barbara
- Santa Clara
- Solano
- Stanislaus
- Trinity
- Ventura

== Analysis ==
Gray Davis won the general election by almost 20% over Dan Lungren. Davis outspent Lungren 28.6 million to 23.8 million. Davis tried to portray Lungren as too conservative. In one debate, Davis attacked Lungren for voting against a Safe Drinking Water Bill in the 1980s while Lungren tried to cast himself as the political heir of former President (and former California Governor) Ronald Reagan. The policy differences between Davis and Lungren were substantial. Davis was pro-abortion rights in a staunchly pro-abortion-rights state, and Lungren was anti-abortion rights. Lungren favored giving children abstinence only education. Both candidates were Roman Catholic. Al Gore, Bill Clinton, Hillary Clinton, and Bob Kerrey made campaign stops in California on Davis's behalf. This is the most recent gubernatorial election in which a Democrat carried Amador, Kings, and Trinity counties. San Bernardino County would not back a Democrat again until 2018. Riverside County would not do so again until 2026.

Davis succeeded in casting Lungren as too far right for California. Even normally conservative San Diego County went for Davis, and – foreshadowing their Democratic trends in the 21st century — remote high mountain Mono County backed a Democratic Governor for the first time ever, and adjacent Alpine County for the first time since 1978. Upon his victory, Davis promised he would focus his attention on education and would convene a special session of the legislature. The race determined who would control reapportionment of congressional districts after the 2000 census.
