= Al Checchi =

American businessman

- Born: Alfred Attilio Checchi; June 6, 1948 (age 77); Massachusetts, U.S.
- Education: Amherst College, Harvard Business School
- Occupations: Businessman, politician
- Spouse: Kathryn Checchi

Alfred Attilio Checchi (born June 6, 1948) is an American businessman who was a candidate for Governor of California in the 1998 gubernatorial election, losing to fellow Democrat Gray Davis in the June 1998 primary. Checchi finished in second place in the Democratic primary, capturing 12.49% of the vote. He ran as a New Democrat and called for increased spending on education. He set a new record at the time for spending in a California gubernatorial race, spending over $40 million of his personal fortune he acquired after selling off all assets owned by Northwest Airlines and leasing everything back out. He then took those millions and ran the costliest political campaign in California at that time. Checchi had previously enjoyed success in various business ventures, most notably serving as co-chairman of Northwest Airlines. He attended the Harvard School of Business. Checchi is married to his wife Kathryn and has 3 children.

== Early life ==
Checchi was born on June 6, 1948, near Boston, Massachusetts. His grandfather ran the Elba Fruit Market, a grocery in Calais, Maine. Checchi is of Italian heritage. He was raised in the suburbs of Washington D.C. to middle-class parents where he attended Our Lady of Good Counsel. Checchi's father was the No. 3 man in the Food and Drug Administration from 1946 to 1960, and later ran an investment firm. Checchi began to think of running for public office when he was 12. At the age of 14, Checchi saw Martin Luther King Jr.'s "I Have a Dream" speech.

Checchi attended Amherst College in Massachusetts because he heard it was the most difficult to get into; he graduated in 1970 with an American studies major. He completed a Master of Business Administration at Harvard School of Business.

== Business career ==
Checchi first worked at Marriott Corporation where he rose quickly due to clever financing for hotel developments at home and abroad. In his 30s, he helped the Bass brothers of Texas acquire a 25% stake in Disney, earning a reported $50 million in the process. In 1989, Checchi helped organize a $3.65 billion leveraged buyout of Minnesota-based Northwest Airlines, investing about $12 million in the transaction. From 1989 to 1993, he served as co-chairman of Northwest Airlines. Checchi's critics claim he moved the company near bankruptcy, forced $800 million in union concessions, and worked to gain $837 million in state and local bonds, subsidies and tax credits, while earning $32 million for his outside firm. Checchi counters that he protected the company from asset strippers and he helped triple the value of Northwest Airlines stock. He amassed a net worth of around $700 million.

== Run for Governor ==
=== Political positions ===
Checchi was a New Democrat, liberal on social issues and conservative on fiscal ones. He campaigned on increasing investing on education, making a 10% across-the-board cut in all state bureaucracies to pay for more teachers, computers, books, universal preschool and after-school programs. He called for teachers to be tested every five years and to expand charter schools. Checchi opposed Proposition 187 because it cut benefits to children of illegal immigrants and called for the prosecution of businesses that hire undocumented workers. Checchi wanted to extend the death penalty to cover serial rapists and repeat child molesters, and he wanted a drug rehabilitation programs for the state's prisoners, with release contingent on a drug-free record. Checchi supported regional planning for growth, financial incentives to stimulate housing, and he promised to cut auto insurance rates by 10 percent. Raising California's pupil spending to the national average. He supports abortion rights for women and parental consent legislation for teenagers seeking abortions. He released a 90-page book detailing his policies and political positions.

Prior to his run for governor, Checchi had voted in 2 of the last 6 elections.

=== The race ===
Checchi spent over $40 million from his personal fortune on his run for governor. Checchi's campaign featured numerous television ads and high priced political advisors and included a television ad that highlighted his Italian American heritage. Other ads highlighted his business experience. One ad featured children struggling to pronounce his name ("Check-ee").

Checchi ran against Lieutenant Governor Gray Davis and US Congresswoman Jane Harman. Checchi led in early polls. Checchi outspent Davis by $33 million and Harman by $25 million. He set a new record at the time for spending in a California gubernatorial race. Checchi came in second in the Democratic primary held on June 2, 1998, with 12.49% of the vote.

As of 2011, Checchi is a registered independent, critical of both major parties.
