= Bishop McNamara High School =

Location
- 6800 Marlboro Pike; Forestville, Maryland 20747; United States; 38°51′8″N 76°53′22″W

Information
- Type: Private, Coeducational, College Preparatory
- Motto: To Think With Christ
- Patron saints: Blessed Fr. Basil Moreau and Saint Andre Bessette
- Founder: Cardinal-Archbishop Patrick A. O'Boyle of the Archdiocese of Washington
- School district: Archdiocese of Washington Catholic Schools
- Oversight: Archdiocese of Washington
- President: John Barnhardt
- Principal: Dian Carter
- Staff: 30
- Faculty: 81
- Grades: 9–12
- Enrollment: 870
- Average class size: 21
- Student to teacher ratio: 11:1
- Campus size: 14+ Acre
- Campus type: Suburban
- Colors: Maroon and Gold
- Song: "Hail to thee, our McNamara"
- Fight song: "The Maroon and Gold Fight Song"
- Athletics conference: Washington Catholic Athletic Conference
- Mascot: Mustang
- Nickname: Mighty Mac
- Accreditation: Middle States Association of Colleges and Schools
- Publication: "Mustang Messenger"
- Yearbook: Caritas
- Tuition: $19,825
- Affiliation: Brothers of Holy Cross; Washington Metro Area Catholic High Schools
- Alumni eNewsletter: "Mustang Minute"
- Student Newspaper: The Stampede Online
- Website: www.bmhs.org

Bishop McNamara High School (BMHS, McNamara, or Mac) is a private, Catholic coed high school in Forestville CDP in unincorporated Prince George's County, Maryland.

The school is in the Holy Cross tradition offering a college preparatory curriculum and a range of Fine Arts, athletics and activities. Founded in 1964 by the Congregation of Holy Cross, Bishop McNamara is located on a 14-acre campus in Forestville, Maryland, United States, 7 miles south of Washington, D.C. and is part of the Roman Catholic Archdiocese of Washington. The school bears the name of Bishop John Michael McNamara, a former auxiliary bishop to the Archbishops of Baltimore and Washington and the founder of St. Gabriel's parish in Washington, D.C.

== History ==
Built on a site adjacent to Mount Calvary Catholic Church on Marlboro Pike in Forestville, Maryland, Bishop McNamara High School is a result of Msgr. Peter Paul Rakowski's plan to build a Catholic high school for boys, and one for girls in the southern part of Prince George's County. To that end, in 1962, Patrick A. O'Boyle, archbishop of Washington, D.C., extended an invitation to the Brothers of Holy Cross to administer and staff the new high school, which would serve the county and parts of Washington, DC. Bishop McNamara High School admitted its first classes (freshman and sophomore) of 334 boys in 1964.

In the academic year 1992–93, the school became co-educational when it accepted girls from La Reine High School, an all girls' school in nearby Suitland that had been closed. Enrollment at both schools had been dwindling for some years, following a trend in private schools across the county as a result of the recession.

== Fine Arts ==
The Fine Arts Programs include:

- Dance - Ballet, Jazz, Lyrical Jazz, Tap, and Traditional African Dance
- Music - (Band & Orchestra and Choir)
- Theater - Introduction To Theatre, Acting, Theatre Technology I & II, Great Stages Of Drama, Senior Seminar, Musical Theatre Production (Fall), Spring Theatre Production
- Visual Arts - Color, Drawing & Advanced Drawing, Graphic Design, Digital Photography I & II, and AP Studio Art 2D-Design and AP Drawing.

== Athletics ==
Bishop McNamara competes in the Washington Catholic Athletic Conference at the Varsity and Junior Varsity levels in the following sports:

Fall - Football, Women's Tennis, Volleyball, Cross Country, Women's Soccer, Men's Soccer, and Cheerleading Winter - Men's Basketball, Women's Basketball, Swimming, Wrestling, Cheerleading, and Indoor Track Spring - Baseball, Softball, Men's Tennis, Men's Lacrosse, Women's Lacrosse, Track & Field, and Golf

== Notable alumni ==
- Waine Bacon – NFL defensive back (2004–2005)
- Todd Bozeman – NCAA basketball coach
- Cameron Chism, CFL player
- Brandon Coleman - NFL wide receiver for the New Orleans Saints
- Chris Cosh – NCAA football defensive coordinator
- Jerome Couplin III – NFL player
- Timothy Creamer – NASA astronaut
- Tyoka Jackson – NFL player
- Liatu King - basketball player
- Jeff Kinney – author of Diary of a Wimpy Kid
- Ty Lawson - basketball player
- Jason Reynolds - National Book Award finalist
- Madison Scott - basketball player
- Marcus Thornton – basketball player
- Keith Veney – NCAA Division I men's basketball record holder for three-pointers made in a single game with 15
- Nicole Yeargin – Olympic medalist (2024) and NCAA Division I sprinter
- Talib Zanna - basketball player who plays in Bulgaria
