= Jelani Jenkins =

American football player (born 1992)

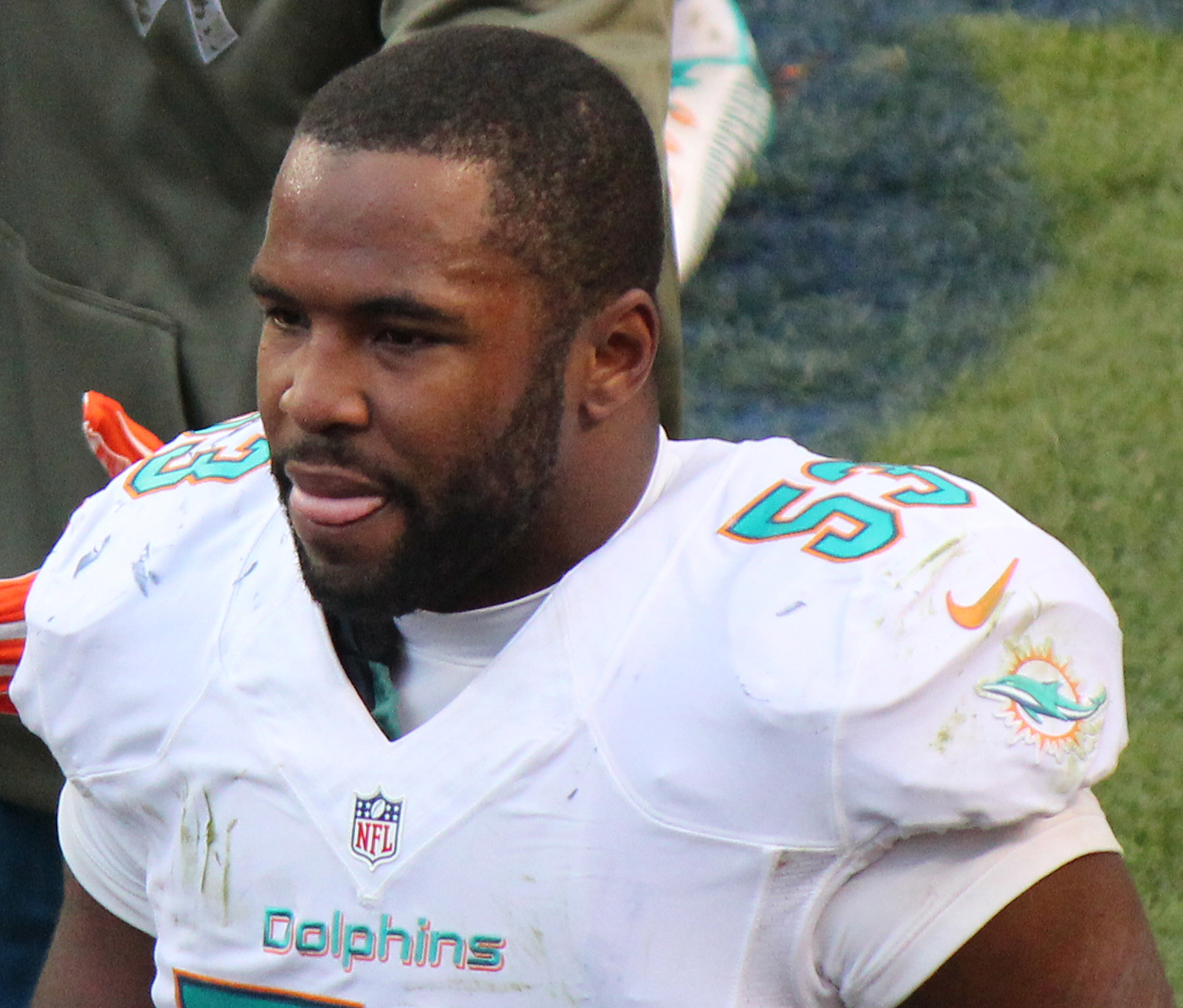
- Jenkins with the Miami Dolphins in 2014

No. 53, 44
- Position: Linebacker

Personal information
- Born: March 13, 1992 (age 34); Rockville, Maryland, U.S.
- Listed height: 6 ft 0 in (1.83 m)
- Listed weight: 240 lb (109 kg)

Career information
- High school: Our Lady of Good Counsel (Olney, Maryland)
- College: Florida (2009-2012)
- NFL draft: 2013: 4th round, 104th overall pick

Career history
- Miami Dolphins (2013–2016); Oakland Raiders (2017)*; Buffalo Bills (2017); Houston Texans (2017)
- * Offseason or practice squad member only

Career NFL statistics
- Total tackles: 238
- Sacks: 3.5
- Forced fumbles: 3
- Fumble recoveries: 1
- Stats at Pro Football Reference

Jelani M. Jenkins (born March 13, 1992) is an American former professional football player who was a linebacker in the National Football League (NFL). He played college football for the Florida Gators and was selected by the Miami Dolphins in the fourth round of the 2013 NFL draft.

== Early life ==
Jenkins attended Our Lady of Good Counsel High School in Olney, Maryland, where he was a two-sport athlete in football and track. As a junior, he played fullback and linebacker. He rushed for 1129 yards and 42 touchdowns at running back and had 60 tackles, four quarterback sacks, an interception, a forced fumble, and recovered two fumbles at linebacker. As a senior, Jenkins rushed for 22 touchdowns and made 70 tackles. He was the first player in the 71-year history of the District's Pigskin Club to earn both Defensive Player of the Year and Scholar-Athlete of the Year honors. He was recognized as a Parade magazine high school All-American in 2008, and was chosen to play in the 2009 Under Armour All-America Game.

Also a standout in track & field, Jenkins competed as a sprinter during his junior and senior seasons. He placed 6th in the 100-meter dash at the 2009 Crimson Tide Invitational, recording a personal-best time of 11.14 seconds. He also competed in the shot put (top-throw of 46 ft or 14.07m), and recorded a 4.4-second 40-yard dash.

Jenkins was one of the top high school football players in the class of 2009. Scout.com ranked him as the No. 7 overall player and the No. 1 linebacker, while Rivals.com ranked him the No. 10 overall recruit and No. 2 at linebacker. Jenkins announced his decision to attend Florida on National Signing Day, February 4, 2009.

== College career ==
Jenkins accepted an athletic scholarship to attend the University of Florida, where he played for coach Urban Meyer and coach Will Muschamp's Florida Gators football teams from 2009 to 2012. He redshirted his first year as a Gator in 2009, appearing in only two games with two registered tackles.

During his second college season in 2010, Jenkins began the season as the team's starting middle linebacker, a role which he held throughout most of the year. Despite the Gators' struggles, Jenkins developed into one of the squad's defensive leaders. He finished the season second on the team in tackles with 73, and also recorded one interception and one fumble recovery. At the conclusion of the season, Jenkins was voted to the 2010 Freshman All-American team by the Southeastern Conference coaches.

In 2011, Jenkins started 12 games at weakside linebacker, missing only the Vanderbilt game due to injury. He finished the season third on the team in tackles (75) and second in breakups (6), adding 6.0 tackles for a loss (37 yards), 2.0 sacks (20 yards), three quarterback hurries, a forced fumble and a 75-yard interception return for a touchdown.

On November 10, 2012, against UL-Lafayette, with the score tied at 20, Jenkins returned a blocked punt 36 yards for a touchdown, giving Florida a 27-20 lead with :02 left in the fourth quarter. Florida would go on to win the game.

== Professional career ==
=== Miami Dolphins ===
The Miami Dolphins selected Jenkins in the fourth round, 104th pick overall, of the 2013 NFL draft. Jenkins took the starting job due to the injury issues surrounding the teams linebacker corps. In his second year, Jenkins wound up leading the team in tackles with 110 on the season.

=== Oakland Raiders ===
On March 20, 2017, Jenkins signed with the Oakland Raiders. On September 2, Jenkins was placed on injured reserve, but was released two days later with a settlement.

=== Buffalo Bills ===
On September 12, 2017, Jenkins signed with the Buffalo Bills. He was released by the Bills on September 19.

=== Houston Texans ===
On October 25, 2017, Jenkins signed with the Houston Texans.

== NFL career statistics ==
Legend
**Bold**	Career high

=== Regular season ===
Year	Team	Games		Tackles					Interceptions					Fumbles			
Year	Team	GP	GS	Cmb	Solo	Ast	Sck	TFL	Int	Yds	TD	Lng	PD	FF	FR	Yds	TD
2013	MIA	**16**	0	17	15	2	0.0	0	0	0	0	0	0	0	0	0	0
2014	MIA	15	**14**	**110**	**83**	**27**	**3.5**	**9**	0	0	0	0	1	**2**	0	0	0
2015	MIA	13	13	71	50	21	0.0	6	0	0	0	0	**3**	1	**1**	0	0
2016	MIA	9	7	29	15	14	0.0	2	0	0	0	0	1	0	0	0	0
2017	HOU	7	1	11	9	2	0.0	1	0	0	0	0	0	0	0	0	0
		60	35	238	172	66	3.5	18	0	0	0	0	5	3	1	0	0

=== Playoffs ===
Year	Team	Games		Tackles					Interceptions					Fumbles			
Year	Team	GP	GS	Cmb	Solo	Ast	Sck	TFL	Int	Yds	TD	Lng	PD	FF	FR	Yds	TD
2016	MIA	**1**	**1**	**2**	**2**	0	0.0	0	0	0	0	0	0	0	0	0	0
		1	1	2	2	0	0.0	0	0	0	0	0	0	0	0	0	0

== Personal life ==
His parents are Maurice Jenkins and Stephanie Hall. His father is an architect in the Washington Metropolitan Area and his mother played basketball at Howard and is a black belt in karate. His mother also worked as a supervisor at a correctional facility in Montgomery County. The name Jelani is Swahili for "mighty". His parents devised a three-page matrix of Jenkin's college choices, breaking down schools by categories such as world academic ranking, graduation rates, diversity, and number of NFL draft picks in the past five years. He was also an accomplished track athlete in high school, running the 100 metres in 11.14 seconds, and throwing the discus 137 feet 2 inches (41.81 m).

== See also ==
- List of Florida Gators in the NFL draft
