= Cameron Chism =

American gridiron football player (born 1990)

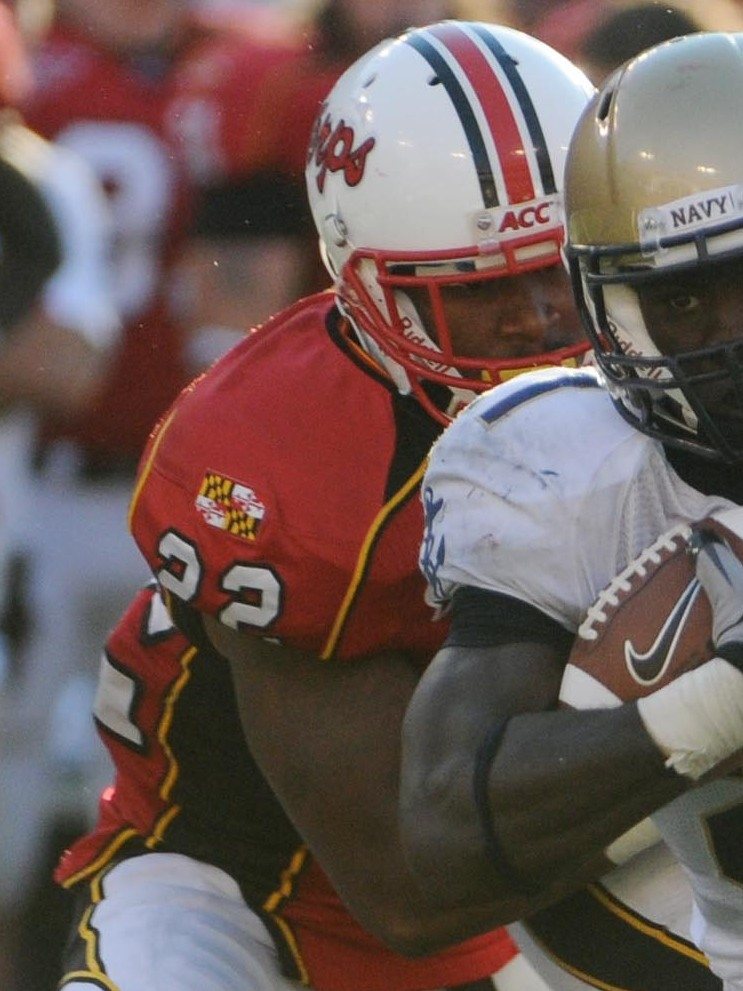
- Chism with Maryland in the 2010 Crab Bowl Classic

No. 13
- Position: Defensive back

Personal information
- Born: December 25, 1990 (age 35); Washington, D.C., U.S.
- Listed height: 5 ft 10 in (1.78 m)
- Listed weight: 190 lb (86 kg)

Career information
- High school: Bishop McNamara (Forestville, Maryland)
- College: Maryland
- NFL draft: 2012: undrafted

Career history
- 2012: Indianapolis Colts*
- 2013: BC Lions
- * Offseason or practice squad member only
- Stats at CFL.ca (archive)

Cameron Chism (born December 25, 1990) is an American former professional football defensive back. He played college football at the University of Maryland, College Park. He was a member of the Indianapolis Colts and BC Lions.

== Early life and college ==
Chism was born on December 25, 1990, in Washington, D.C. He attended Bishop McNamara High School in Forestville, Maryland.

He lettered for the Maryland Terrapins from 2008 to 2011.

== Professional career ==
Chism signed with the Indianapolis Colts of the National Football League (NFL) after going undrafted in the 2012 NFL draft on April 29, 2012. He was released on August 26 of the same year.

Chism was signed to the practice squad of the BC Lions of the Canadian Football League on August 12, 2013. He played in three games, all starts, for the Lions in 2013, recording eight defensive tackles, one special teams tackle, and 13 pass breakups. He was released on June 15, 2014.
