= La Reine High School =

All-girls' Catholic high school in US

Coordinates: 38.8548°N 76.9195°W

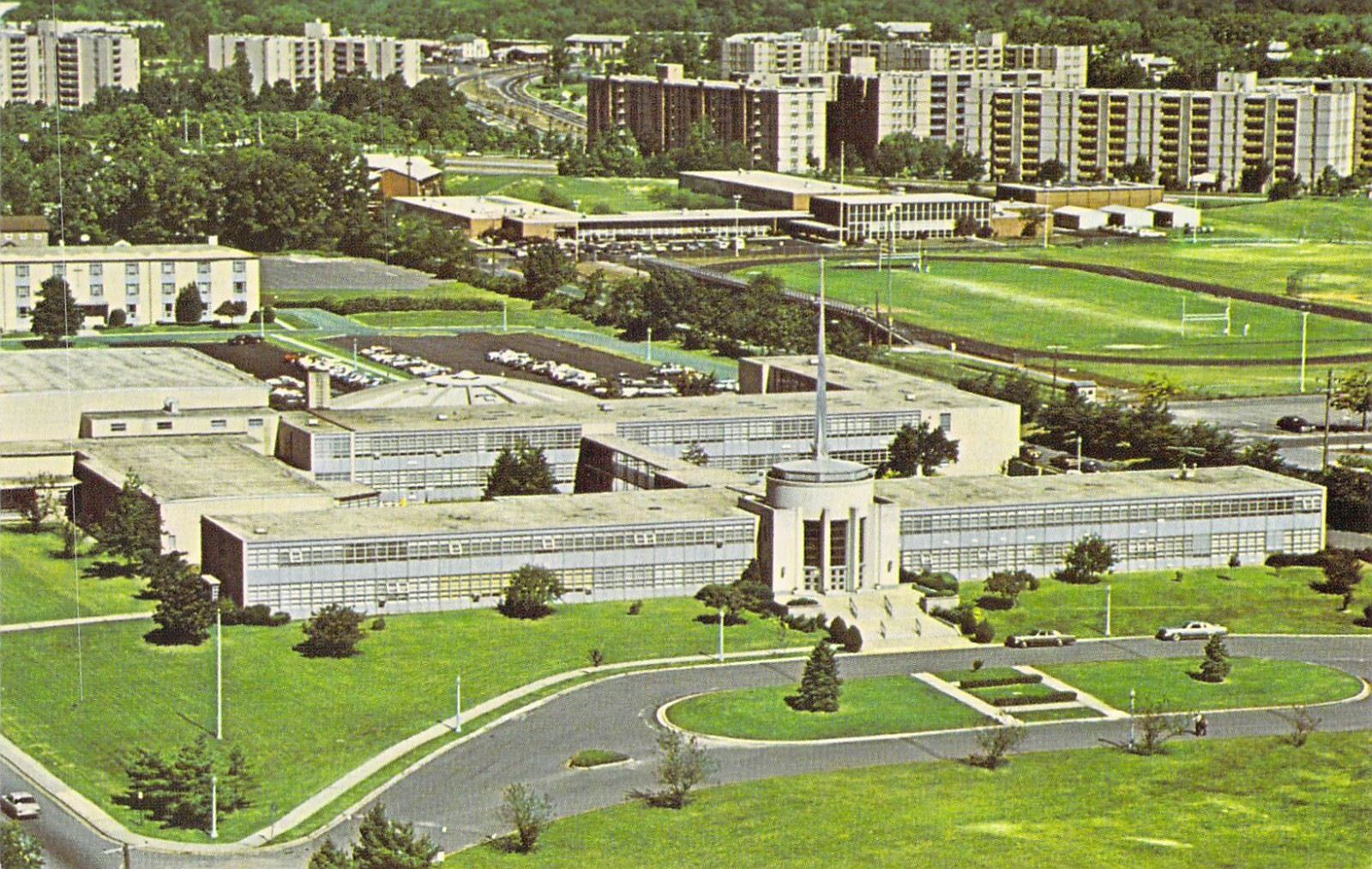
1980 postcard of the school

La Reine High School (LRHS) was an all-girls' Catholic high school in Suitland in unincorporated Prince George's County, Maryland, under the Roman Catholic Archdiocese of Washington.

Its students lived in Maryland and Washington, D.C.

The school opened in 1960. In 1992 it closed, with its students going to Bishop McNamara High School, previously only for boys. The school's stained glass windows, which were created in the 1950s, were given to Our Lady of the Presentation Catholic Church in Poolesville, Maryland. The building was acquired by the county in 1994 as Drew-Freeman Middle School. It was demolished in 2021.
