= Zach Hilton =

American football player (born 1980)

No. 81, 86
- Position: Tight end

Personal information
- Born: July 2, 1980 (age 46); Washington, D.C., U.S.
- Listed height: 6 ft 8 in (2.03 m)
- Listed weight: 268 lb (122 kg)

Career information
- High school: Our Lady of Good Counsel (Olney, Maryland)
- College: North Carolina
- NFL draft: 2003: undrafted

Career history
- New Orleans Saints (2003–2005); New York Jets (2006); Washington Redskins (2007)*; San Francisco 49ers (2007)*; New Orleans VooDoo (2008)
- * Offseason or practice squad member only

Career NFL statistics
- Receptions: 35
- Receiving yards: 396
- Receiving touchdowns: 1
- Stats at Pro Football Reference

Career AFL statistics
- Receptions: 6
- Receiving yards: 26
- Receiving touchdowns: 1
- Stats at ArenaFan.com

Zachary Thomas Hilton (born July 2, 1980) is an American former professional football player who was a tight end in the National Football League (NFL). He was originally signed by the New Orleans Saints. He played college football for the North Carolina Tar Heels.

== College career ==
Hilton attended the University of North Carolina at Chapel Hill, starting at tight end in his junior and senior seasons. He played defense in his freshman and sophomore years. He recorded 31 receptions for 346 yards and three touchdowns. He was named the North Carolina Most Improved Player in his senior year because of his 19 receptions for one touchdown and 258 yards. He received a degree in history.

== Professional career ==
=== National Football League ===
Hilton was signed as an undrafted free agent by the New Orleans Saints. In his rookie preseason, he recorded four receptions for 91 yards. He was then inactive for eleven games, but saw playing time in three. In 2004, he was inactive and eventually signed to the Saints' practice squad. He was re-signed to the active roster by Week 13 of the regular season but was still inactive. He finally received playing time in 2005. He started six games, recording 35 receptions for 396 yards and one touchdown after starter Ernie Conwell was injured. Hilton caught a career-long 29-yard reception against the Tampa Bay Buccaneers.

Hilton was released by the Saints before the 2006 regular season began. He was signed and released by the New York Jets twice in 2006, failing to crack the active roster. He then signed a one-year contract for the league minimum salary, with the Washington Redskins. He was then released by the Redskins in the summer of 2007, without having played a game in Washington. He then was signed by the San Francisco 49ers in July 2007, but was cut before the regular season began.

=== Arena Football League ===
In 2008, Hilton signed a one-year contract with the New Orleans VooDoo of the Arena Football League to play Offensive specialist. Hilton retired in June 2008 and is now working in Arizona for a growing medical technology company specializing in medical instrumentation.

== Personal life ==
Hilton attended Our Lady of Good Counsel High School at the old Wheaton, Maryland Campus, where his father, Tom Hilton is a teacher.
