= Harold H. Bloomfield =

American psychiatrist and author (born 1944)

- Citizenship: US
- Education: University of Pittsburgh; SUNY Downstate Medical Center
- Occupations: Psychiatrist, writer, politician
- Spouse: Divorced
- Children: One
- Writing career
- Genre: Self-help
- Notable works: How to Survive the Loss of a Love, TM: Discovering Inner Energy and Overcoming Stress

Harold H. Bloomfield (born October 8, 1944) is an American psychiatrist and author.

== Early life and education ==
Bloomfield was born on October 8, 1944, in New York, New York, to an accountant and housewife. He grew up in New York City and showed interest in becoming a psychiatrist at age seven.

Bloomfield graduated cum laude with a B.S. from the University of Pittsburgh and from the SUNY Downstate Medical Center with an M.D. with honors.

He worked at the Kaiser Foundation's hospital in San Francisco as an intern from 1969 to 1970. He did his psychiatric residency at Yale University School of Medicine from 1970 to 1973.

== Career ==
He received the David Berger Award in 1978 and the Golden Apple Award in 1982. He worked at the Institute of Psychophysiological Medicine in El Cajon, California, from 1970 to 1973 and became its director of psychiatry in 1974. He became a professor of psychiatry at Maharishi International University in 1974. He was adjunct professor of psychiatry at Union Graduate School and director of his own practice called Age of Enlightenment Center for Holistic Health in San Diego, California, from 1972 to 1973.

Bloomfield has authored or co-authored 20 books and was a founder of the American Holistic Medical Association. He is the author of Making Peace with your Parents, Making Peace with Yourself, Making Peace with Your Step-Parents, Making Peace with Your Past, Hypericum (St. John's Wort) & Depression, How to Heal Depression, and the bestsellers How to Survive the Loss of a Love and TM: Discovering Inner Energy and Overcoming Stress. According to his publisher his books have sold more than seven million copies and have been translated into over 30 languages.

According to a 1986 survey published in the American Journal of Psychotherapy Bloomfield's book, How to Survive the Loss of a Love, was one of the top ten self-help books recommended by the 123 American psychologists in the survey. Bloomfield received the Theodor Geisel Book Award in 1999.

Bloomfield practised Transcendental Meditation; he traveled with Maharishi Mahesh Yogi in India. He was a candidate for Governor of California in 1998 on the Natural Law Party ticket and received 27,000 votes.

He has appeared in numerous TV shows including The Merv Griffin Show, Larry King Live, The Oprah Winfrey Show, The View, CNN, Good Morning America and 20/20.

Bloomfield's book Making Peace with God was published in October 2003.

Bloomfield has received the Medical Self-Care Book of the Year Award and the American Holistic Health Association Lifetime Achievement Award.

== Personal life ==
Bloomfield married Sirah Vetesse in 1982 and divorced 20 years later. He has one child, a daughter.

== Publications ==
- How to Survive the Loss of a Love
- Making Peace with your Parents
- Making Peace with Yourself
- Making Peace with Your Step-Parents
- Making Peace with Your Past
- Hypericum (St. John's Wort) & Depression
- How to Heal Depression
- TM: Discovering Inner Energy and Overcoming Stress
- Making Peace with God
